= Sébastien Loeb =

French rally driver (born 1974)

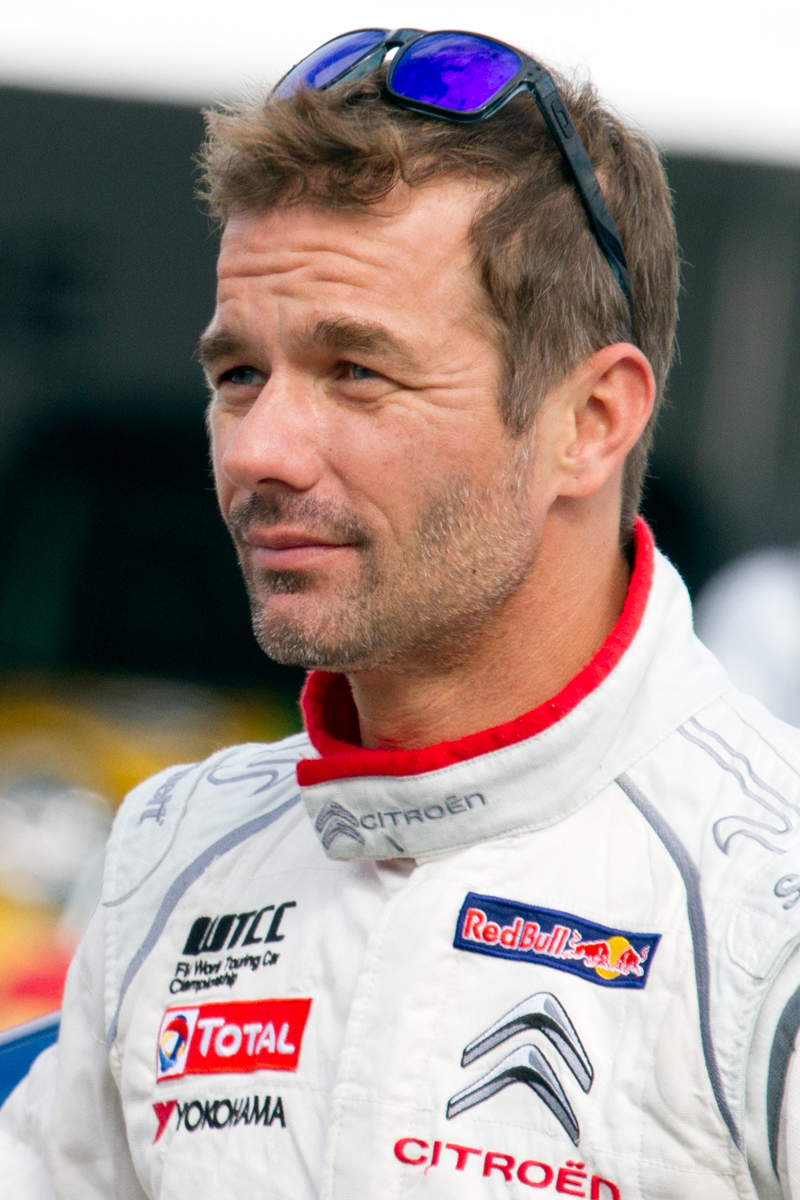
- Loeb at the 2014 FIA WTCC Race of Japan
- Born: 26 February 1974 (age 52); Haguenau, France
World Rally Championship record
- Years active: 1999–2013, 2015, 2018–2020, 2022
- Co-driver: (Monaco) Daniel Elena; (France) Isabelle Galmiche
- Teams: (France) Citroën; (Belgium) Kronos Citroën; (South Korea) Hyundai; (United Kingdom) M-Sport Ford
- Rallies: 184
- Championships: 9 (2004, 2005, 2006, 2007, 2008, 2009, 2010, 2011, 2012)
- Rally wins: 80
- Podiums: 120
- Stage wins: 939
- Total points: 1,778
- First rally: (Spain) 1999 Rally Catalunya
- First win: (Germany) 2002 Rallye Deutschland
- Last win: (Monaco) 2022 Rallye Monte Carlo
- Last rally: (Greece) 2022 Acropolis Rally
World Rallycross Championship record
- Years active: 2016–2018
- Teams: (Sweden) Team Peugeot-Hansen, (France) Special ONE Racing
- Car number: 9
- Starts: 39
- Wins: 2
- Podiums: 17
- Best finish: 4th in 2018
World Touring Car Championship record
- Years active: 2014–2015
- Teams: (France) Citroën Total WTCC
- Car number: 9
- Starts: 47
- Wins: 6
- Podiums: 20
- Best finish: 3rd in 2014 and 2015
Dakar Rally career
- Teams: (France) Peugeot; Bahrain Raid Xtreme
- Co-driver: (Monaco) Daniel Elena; (Belgium) Fabian Lurquin
- Starts: 8
- Wins: 0
- Podiums: 5
- Best finish: 2nd in 2017, 2022, 2023
- Finished last season: 3rd
World Rally-Raid Championship career
- Teams: Bahrain Raid Xtreme
- Co-driver: (Belgium) Fabian Lurquin
- Starts: 15
- Wins: 3
- Podiums: 7
Extreme E career
- Debut season: 2021
- Teams: (United Kingdom) Team X44 (2021 - 2022) (Spain) ABT Cupra
- Car number: 44
- Starts: 10
- Wins: 2
- Podiums: 6
- Best finish: 1st in 2022
Previous series
- 2016–2018 2014–2015 2013 2013 2011–2012 2010 2008–2009 2008–2013 2005–2006: World Rallycross Championship; World Touring Car Championship; Porsche Supercup; FIA GT Series; Porsche Carrera Cup France; International GT Open; Porsche Carrera Cup France; French GT Championship; 24 Hours of Le Mans
Medal record
Representing France
X Games
| Gold medal – first place | 2012 Los Angeles | Rallycross |
Race of Champions
| Winner | 2003 Gran Canaria | Individual |
| Runner-up | 2004 Saint-Denis | Individual |
| Winner | 2004 Saint-Denis | Team |
| Winner | 2005 Saint-Denis | Individual |
| Runner-up | 2006 Saint-Denis | Individual |
| Winner | 2008 London | Individual |
| Runner-up | 2010 Düsseldorf | Individual |
| Winner | 2022 Piteå | Individual |
| Winner | 2025 Sydney | Individual |
| Winner | 2025 Sydney | Team |
- Website: sebastienloeb.com

Signature
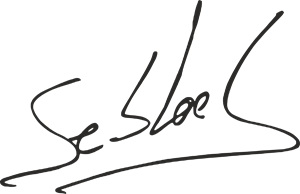

Sébastien Loeb (French: [sebastjɛ̃ lœb]; born 26 February 1974) is a French professional rally, racing and rallycross driver. He was the most successful driver in the World Rally Championship (WRC), having won the world championship a record nine times (in a row), a record (nine titles) since equalled by Sébastien Ogier in 2025. He holds several other WRC records, including most event wins, most podium finishes and most stage wins. Loeb retired from full time WRC participation at the end of 2012. He currently drives part time in the WRC for M-Sport Ford World Rally Team, and full time in the World Rally-Raid Championship (W2RC) for Bahrain Raid Xtreme.

Originally a gymnast, Loeb was a four time Champion of Alsace and one time champion of the French Grand East. He switched to rallying in 1995 and won the Junior World Rally Championship in 2001. Signed by the Citroën World Rally Team for the 2002 season, he and co-driver Daniel Elena took their maiden WRC win that same year at the Rallye Deutschland. After finishing runner-up to Petter Solberg by one point in 2003, Loeb took his first drivers' title in 2004. Continuing with Citroën, he went on to take a record ninth consecutive world title in 2012. Loeb is a tarmac expert, having won all but three of the WRC rallies on that surface in which he has participated between 2005 and 2013. In 2018, Loeb won the Spanish round of that year's championship, in a rare entry six years after his retirement as a full-time WRC driver.

Loeb made his debut at the Dakar Rally in 2016 and has participated in it every year since bar 2020. He has a best finish of second in 2017, 2022 and 2023. Besides his success in rallying, Loeb is a five-time winner at the Race of Champions, after taking home the Henri Toivonen Memorial Trophy and the title "Champion of Champions" in 2003, 2005, 2008, 2022 and 2025. In 2004, he won the Nations' Cup for France with Jean Alesi and in 2025 with Victor Martins. In 2006, he finished second in the 24 Hours of Le Mans. Loeb was named the French Sportsman of the Year in 2007 and 2009, and made knight of the Legion of Honour (Légion d'honneur) in 2009. In 2012, he won the rallycross final in his first appearance at X Games XVIII. The same year, Loeb founded his own motorsports team, Sébastien Loeb Racing; which participates in various racing series. The following year, he participated in the FIA GT Series for Loeb Racing and scored four wins and finished fourth overall. In 2014 and 2015, he had a successful stint in the World Touring Car Championship, scoring six wins in total and with a best finish of third overall in both seasons. From 2016 to 2018, he also participated in the FIA World Rallycross Championship, with two wins and a best position of fourth overall.

In 2021, Loeb tested the Ford Puma Rally1 car several times, before joining the M-Sport Ford WRT for a part-time drive in the 2022 WRC season. He took his 80th WRC victory at the 2022 Monte Carlo Rally, barely a week after finishing second at the 2022 Dakar Rally. Loeb later also won the 2022 Extreme E Championship alongside Cristina Gutiérrez; for Lewis Hamilton's Team X44. Loeb has also competed in other motorsports like the GT World Challenge Europe, the Porsche Supercup, the 24 Hours of Le Mans, the Andros Trophy and other racing categories across many disciplines. Loeb is the only racing driver to win an event in four different FIA-affiliated world championships since winning the Andalucía Rally in 2022.

== Career ==
=== Rallying ===
==== Early career ====
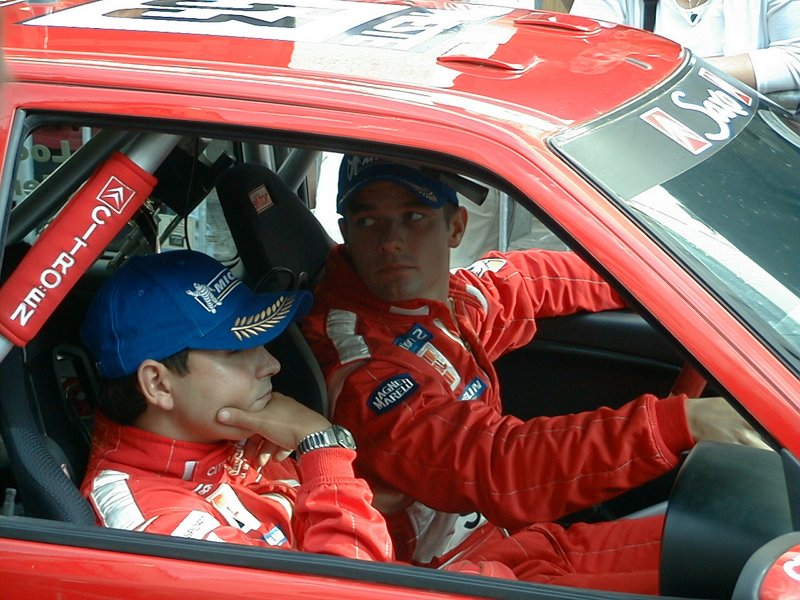
Loeb and Elena at the 2001 Rally Finland

Loeb initially competed as a gymnast and became a four-time Alsatian champion, once champion of the French Grand East, and fifth in the French championship. He broke off school in 1992 but resumed taking classes in 1994, aiming at vocational training in electrical engineering. On 12 September 1994, in parallel with his classes, he started working as an electrician at the Socalec company near Haguenau Airport, where he was the oldest apprentice and already noted for his daring/reckless driving style. On this level, he could count on the understanding of his boss, who was himself fascinated by speed and owned a Ferrari Testarossa 512 TR.

In 1995, at age 21, Loeb quit his job and classes and definitively turned his attention to racing. In 1998, he started entering events in the French Citroën Saxo Trophy series, winning the title in 1999. Guy Fréquelin, Citroën Sport's team principal, would serve as Loeb's mentor as he entered the Junior World Rally Championship in 2001, becoming the series' first champion by winning five of the six events. The only event he didn't win this year was Rallye Sanremo: for this event, he was elected as a driver for the WRC championship, driving a Citroën Xsara WRC alongside Philippe Bugalski and Jesús Puras. In only his third rally with a World Rally Car, he surprisingly hounded Peugeot tarmac specialist and eventual victor Gilles Panizzi to the finish, and ended up second.

==== 2002–03 ====
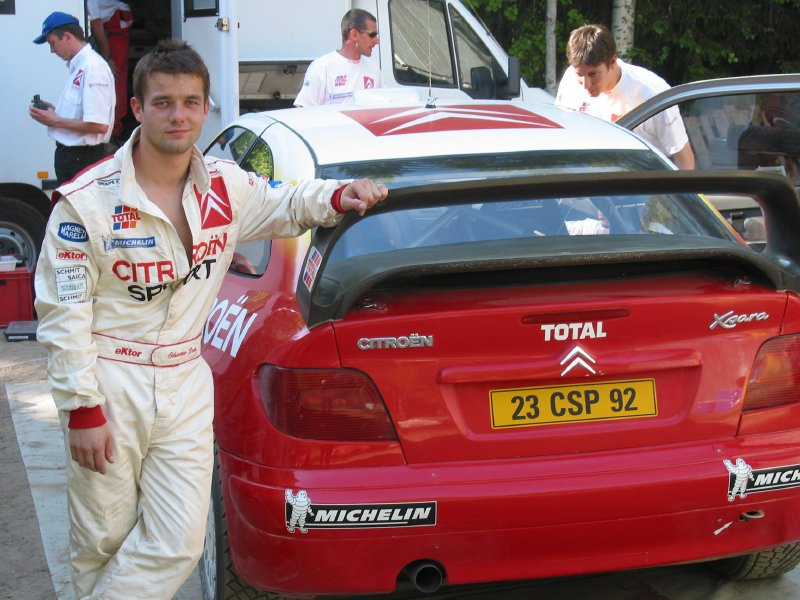
Loeb during Citroën's testing in Finland in May 2002

The 2002 season was Loeb's first as a WRC driver with the Citroën Total World Rally Team, although the team only participated in seven rounds in the build-up to their full entry the following year. Loeb started the season by provisionally winning the Monte Carlo Rally, after racing under appeal due to a two-minute time penalty incurred by an illegal tyre change during the second day. Citroën considered the penalty too severe but later withdrew the appeal, and Subaru's Tommi Mäkinen then took a record fourth consecutive Monte Carlo win. Loeb later took his maiden victory at the Rallye Deutschland in Germany, edging out Peugeot's Richard Burns.

In 2003, his first full season in the championship, Loeb won three WRC events, Monte Carlo, Germany and Sanremo, before losing to Petter Solberg in the Wales Rally Great Britain, also losing the championship to him by just one point. Loeb was asked by his team not to chase Solberg at all costs so that he didn't jeopardise Citroën's lead in the constructors' championship. Loeb's reputation grew as he defeated his more illustrious teammates – Carlos Sainz and Colin McRae – over the course of the season.

==== 2004 ====
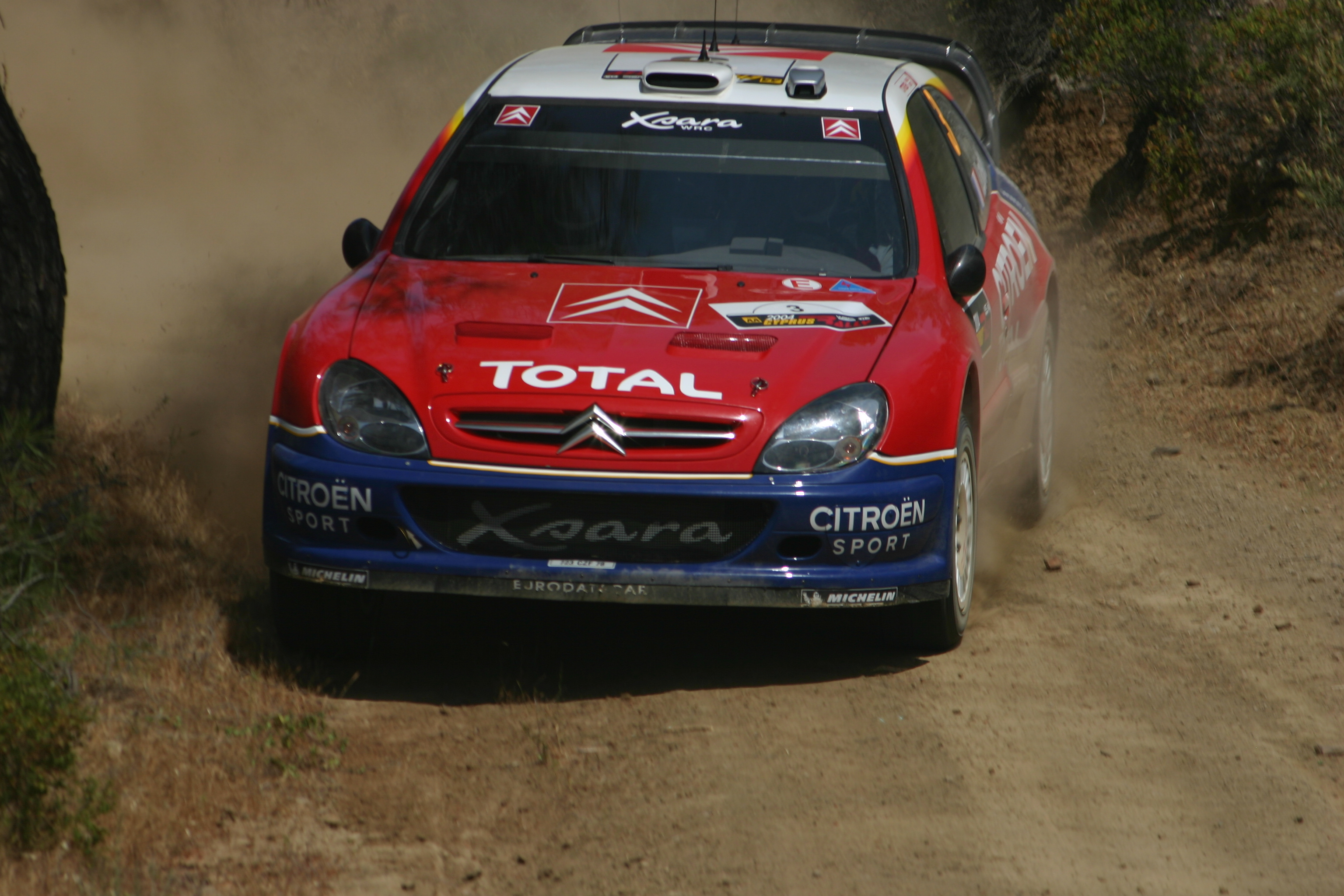
Loeb at the 2004 Cyprus Rally

In the 2004 season, Loeb dominated the WRC scene in a similar way to Michael Schumacher's domination of Formula One the same year, by winning six events and taking six runner-up spots to securely give him the drivers' title, 36 points clear of second-placed Solberg. His six WRC victories tied the record for victories in one season with fellow Frenchman Didier Auriol, who won six events in 1992. He was also responsible for Citroën's second manufacturers' title in a row.

Originally known as a tarmac specialist, 2004 was the year Loeb proved himself capable of winning on other surfaces as well. He won the snow-based Swedish Rally, becoming the first non-Nordic to win the event. On gravel, he triumphed in the Cyprus Rally, Rally of Turkey and the Rally Australia. On tarmac, he continued his success in Monte Carlo and Germany.

==== 2005 ====
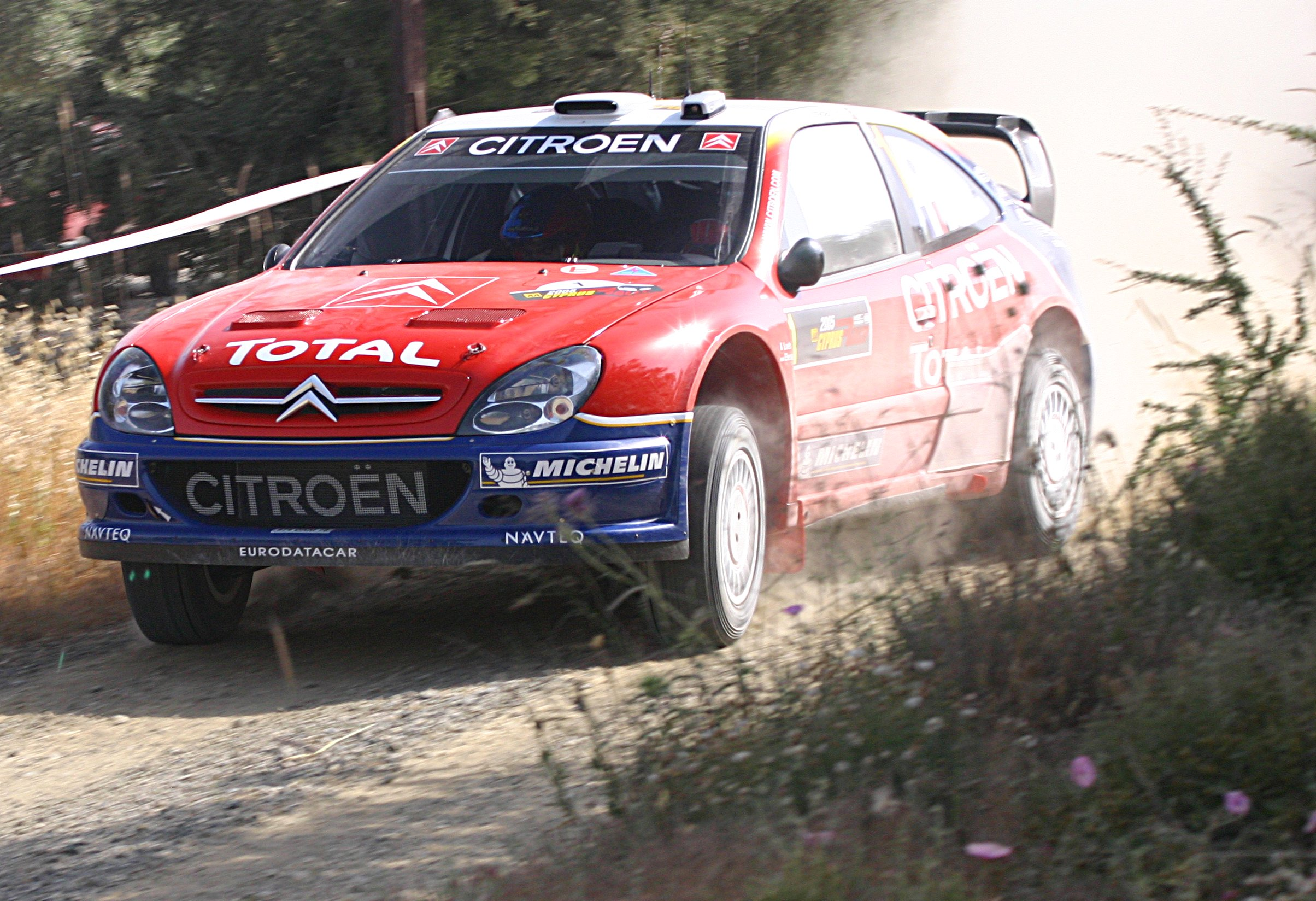
Loeb at the 2005 Cyprus Rally

In 2005, with victory in the ninth round in Argentina, Loeb became the first to win six consecutive rallies, beating Timo Salonen's record of four from 1985. Having already won the season-opening Rallye Automobile Monte Carlo, he also became the first to win seven in a season, beating his (and Didier Auriol's) own record of six wins in a season. Loeb was in a position to clinch the title while leading the Wales Rally Great Britain, but after it was announced that the last two stages of the rally would be abandoned due to the death of Markko Märtin's co-driver Michael Park in an accident on stage 15, Loeb deliberately incurred a two-minute penalty to drop him to third place and avoid retaining his title in such circumstances. He went on to secure the title by finishing second to Peugeot's Marcus Grönholm at the next rally in Japan.

Loeb eventually extended his win record to ten and won the title with a 56-point margin, breaking a 25-year-old record; Walter Röhrl's margin over Hannu Mikkola in 1980 was 54. Loeb set several other records during the season as well. He won all twelve stages in the 2005 Tour de Corse in France, which marked the first time a driver had won every stage of a WRC rally. Loeb's twelve podium and thirteen points-scoring finishes in a row were also new records in the series.

==== 2006 ====
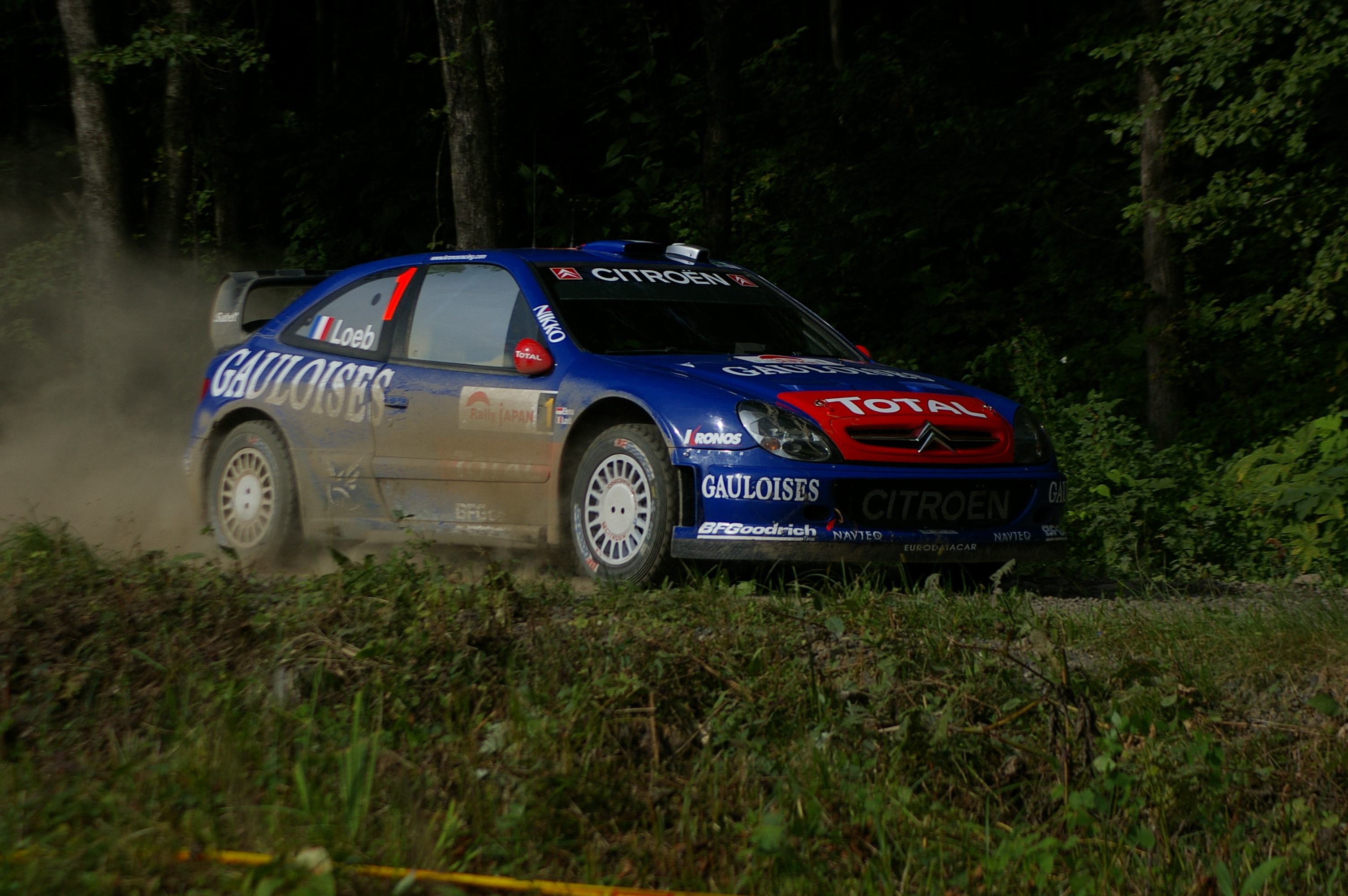
Loeb at the 2006 Rally Japan

Citroën's parent company, PSA Peugeot Citroën, pulled both manufacturers out of the WRC at the end of 2005, but Citroën planned to return in 2007 with the C4 WRC, and developed the car during 2006. Loeb was closely involved with this as he was guaranteed the leading role in the team at the comeback. In the meantime, a 'gap year' beckoned in the privateer ranks, namely with Citroën-sponsored Kronos Racing entered as the Kronos Total Citroën World Rally Team.

In order to score on the first round in Monte Carlo, Loeb was initially forced to activate the SupeRally rules for retiring competitors, having spun off the road on day one. Although he did manage to fight his way back to second place, it was the first time he had ever been beaten to the finish (namely by fellow double world champion Marcus Grönholm) on these roads in the Xsara WRC. This outcome was mirrored on the following month's Swedish Rally, with Grönholm again the man to whom Loeb was forced to give best, placing the duo in an early runaway 1–2 position in the points standings.

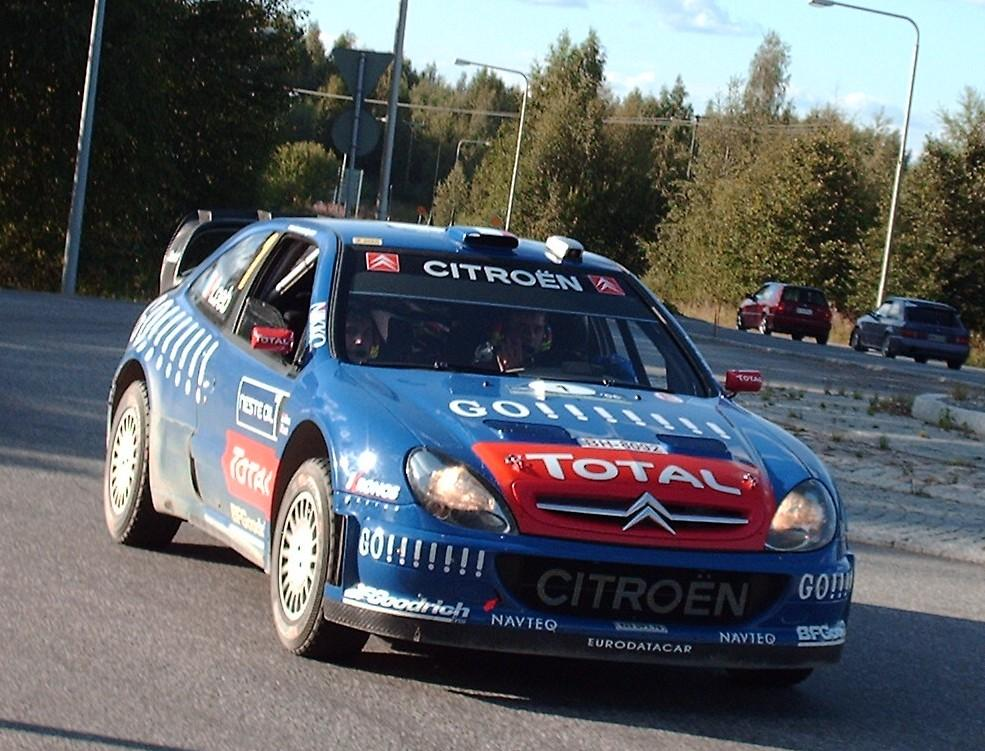
Loeb on a road section during the 2006 Rally Finland

But Loeb's bridesmaid status was not to last, and racking up a triumph on the ensuing Rally Mexico – the first of five on the trot that season – propelled him into a championship lead he was never to lose. He tied Carlos Sainz's record number of 26 individual rally victories in August with a fifth consecutive victory in Germany. With his subsequent victory in Japan, the world record of 27 victories and counting eventually became his. His victory in Cyprus put him on the verge of a third consecutive World Rally Championship title.

Shortly after, Loeb broke his right humerus in a mountain-biking accident near his home in Switzerland, causing him to miss the last four rallies of the season (Turkey, Australia, New Zealand and Wales). In spite of this, Loeb had accumulated such a huge point lead before Turkey that Marcus Grönholm's failure to finish third or better in Australia handed Loeb the 2006 championship crown by one point. He received the news at home via an Internet video link to the rally HQ. Due to the time difference, he made do with early morning coffee instead of the customary champagne, calling the whole experience "strange".

In 2022, on the WRC Backstories Podcast with Becs Williams, Loeb revealed that he even considered to co-drive for Colin McRae for the rest of the season due to the injury. As co-drivers themselves scored points, Loeb could have possibly scored points for himself as a driver to try and win the title. The plan never came to fruition though as Grönholm's crash meant Loeb won the title anyway.

==== 2007 ====
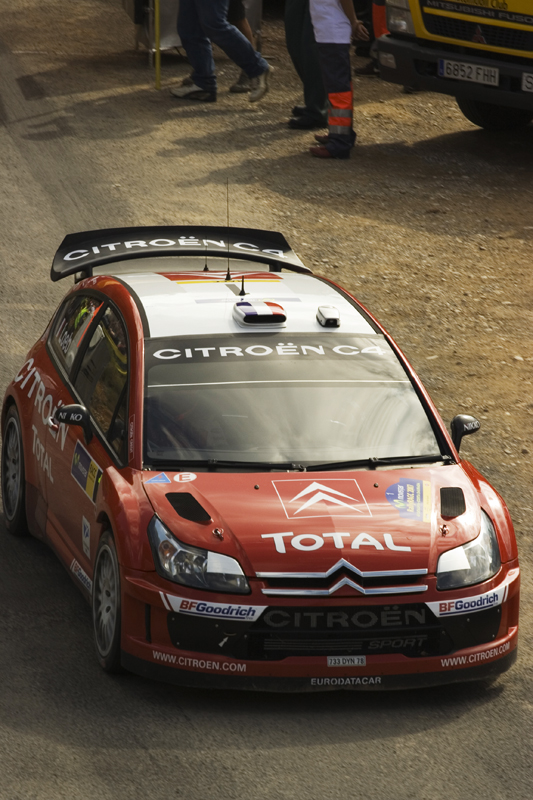
Loeb at the 2007 Rally Catalunya

For 2007, Loeb returned as an official Citroën driver, with the new Citroën C4 WRC. He won the 75ème Rallye Automobile de Monte-Carlo, the first race for the new C4, following that with a solid second place after Grönholm, in Sweden, to set a two-point lead over the Finn after two of 16 rounds. At the first Rally Norway, Loeb went off and lost eight minutes during SS12 while chasing Grönholm and the leader, Mikko Hirvonen. On the next stage, he made another mistake and lost nine minutes. He eventually finished 14th in the rally and dropped to third in the championship standings. He won 8 of the 18 stages in this rally. Loeb won the next rally, the 21º Corona Rally México, 55.8 seconds clear of Grönholm.

Loeb then followed this success with his third and fourth season victories on the Portuguese and Argentinian rallies. Characteristically, he was once more to be found in the lead on the seventh round, the Rally d'Italia in Sardinia. On new stages on the final leg to those of the previous year, however, Loeb was once more to lament error and the surrender of probable victory, this time after crashing and breaking his car's suspension in a ditch. He left the lead in the hands of Grönholm, who won to propel himself seven points ahead of Loeb at the top of the championship standings. A second loss to the Finn in as many years on the Acropolis Rally then extended the deficit to nine points over the championship's summer break.

Loeb occupied his recess by, amongst other engagements, competing in the Shell Donegal International Rally on 15, 16 and 17 June, partially as preparation for the coming Rally Ireland World Championship round that November. He scored a comprehensive victory, albeit only after being given a scare by the pace of tenacious private Subaru-driver Mark Higgins, who had a 45-second lead at the end of day one. Punctures afflicted upon his rival eventually settled the contest.

Ambitions of finally scoring victory on Rally Finland proved once more unrealised, with Loeb relegated to third place behind the pacy natives Grönholm and Hirvonen. Rallye Deutschland, as was traditional, differed somewhat. At the scene of his first victory and on a rally where he had never subsequently lost, Loeb was left unexpectedly to fend off the challenge not of the Finn, but of a privateer, his one-time teammate and championship returnee François Duval. He eventually triumphed and reduced some of his championship points deficit.

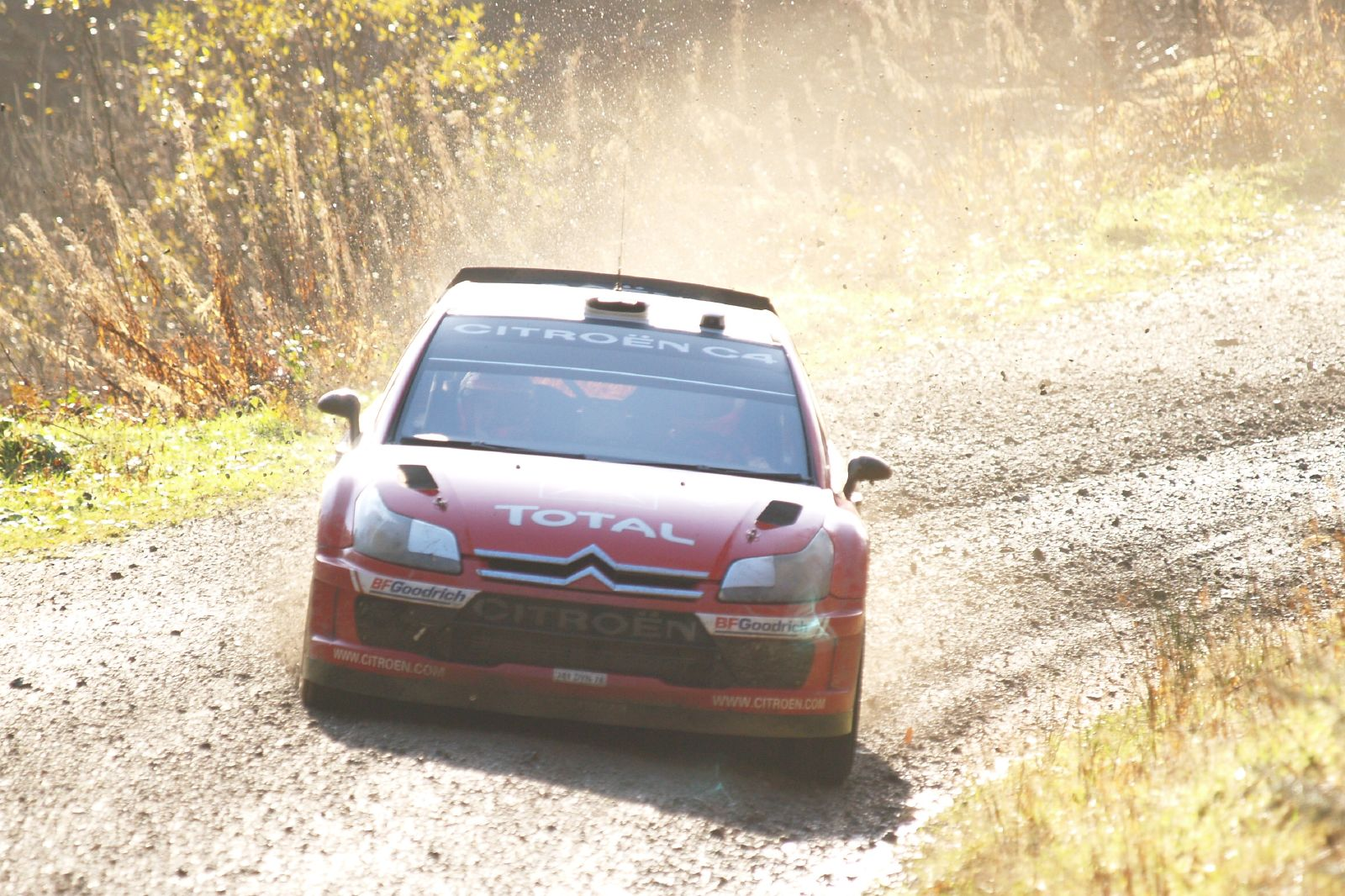
Loeb at the 2007 Wales Rally GB

A very close battle on the gravel stages of Rally New Zealand ended with the second closest win in WRC history – Loeb finished only 0.3s behind his main rival. The next two rounds allowed the French driver to regain some points, as he won both tarmac events – Rallye Espana, where his teammate Dani Sordo took second place and two points from Grönholm, and Rally France.

Rally Japan was another dramatic event – Loeb got the chance to take the lead in the Championship after Grönholm's early mistake, but he was unable to, as his co-driver's mistake caused the C4 to go off the road on one of the stages of second leg. Both drivers ended with no points after finally retiring from the event. In Ireland, during 1st Rally Ireland almost the same happened – Marcus Grönholm overcooked a slippery right corner on one of the early stages, trying to keep a fast pace, and had to retire from the rally. Loeb made use of his rival's mistake and, by making no major mistakes, although having some suspension-related problems with keeping pace at the beginning, he added 10 points to his account, moving ahead of the Finnish driver just one round before the season's end. In Wales he was not fighting for the win, focusing mostly on securing his advantage, finishing the event third – on 2 December 2007 Loeb became World Rally Champion for the fourth time in a row.

==== 2008 ====
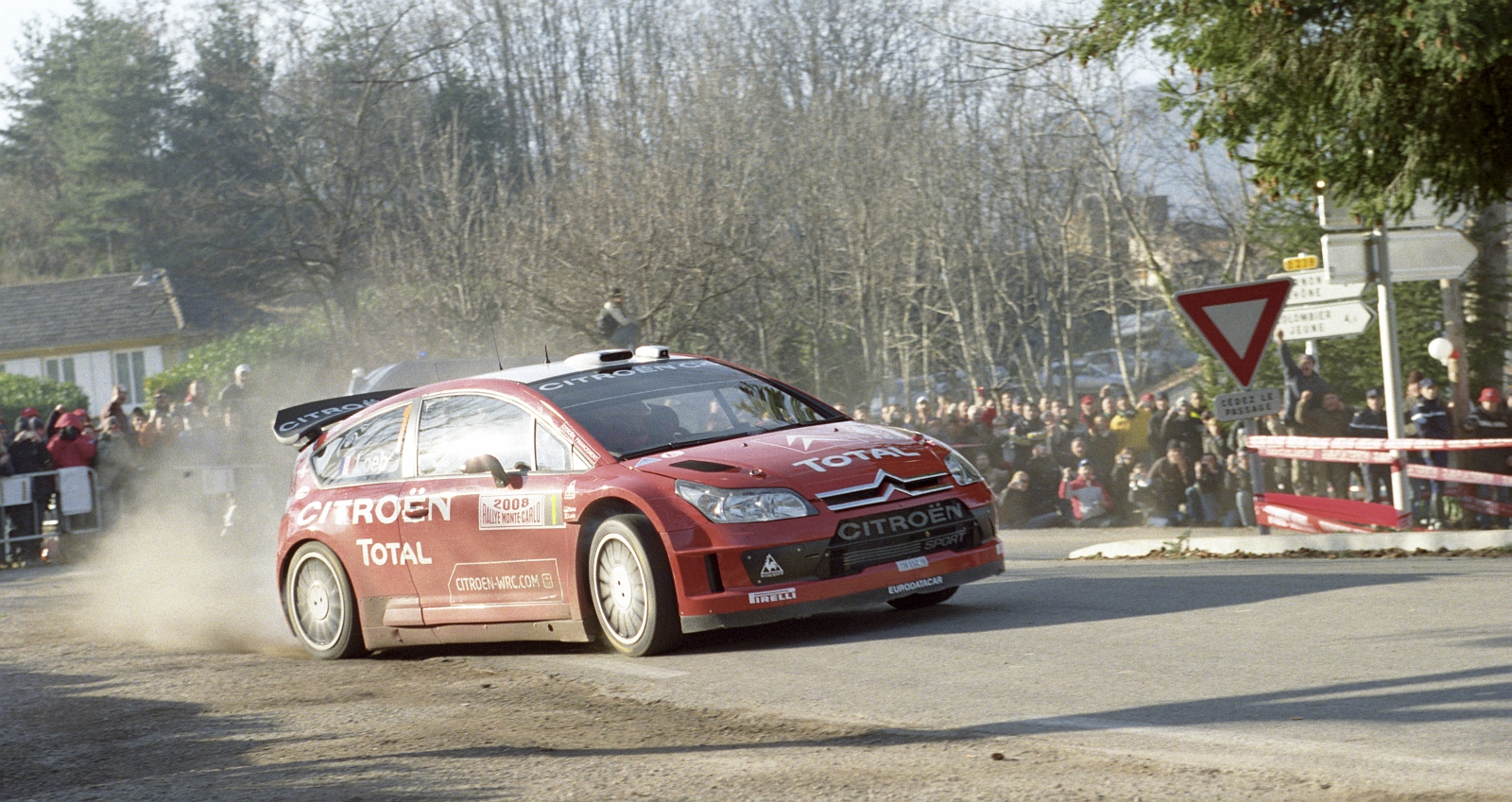
Loeb with his C4 WRC at the 2008 Monte Carlo Rally

Loeb started the 2008 season with a record fifth win in Monte Carlo. On the second rally of the year, 2008 Swedish Rally, he crashed out during day one. Although he re-joined the rally to collect manufacturers' points, the team later decided to retire him due to a damaged engine. After winning in Mexico and Argentina, Loeb had a crash with Conrad Rautenbach on a road section in Jordan, from which he could only recover to take tenth place in the rally. He went on to win two events, and then finish close third to the Ford factory team duo Mikko Hirvonen and Jari-Matti Latvala at the Rally of Turkey.

Loeb later notably won the Rally Finland ahead of Hirvonen. This was the fourth time in the event's 58-year history that a non-Nordic driver won the rally, after Carlos Sainz in 1990, Didier Auriol in 1992 and Markko Märtin in 2003. This started a string of five victories for Loeb. In Germany, New Zealand and Spain, Citroën also took double wins as his teammate Dani Sordo took three runner-up spots in a row.

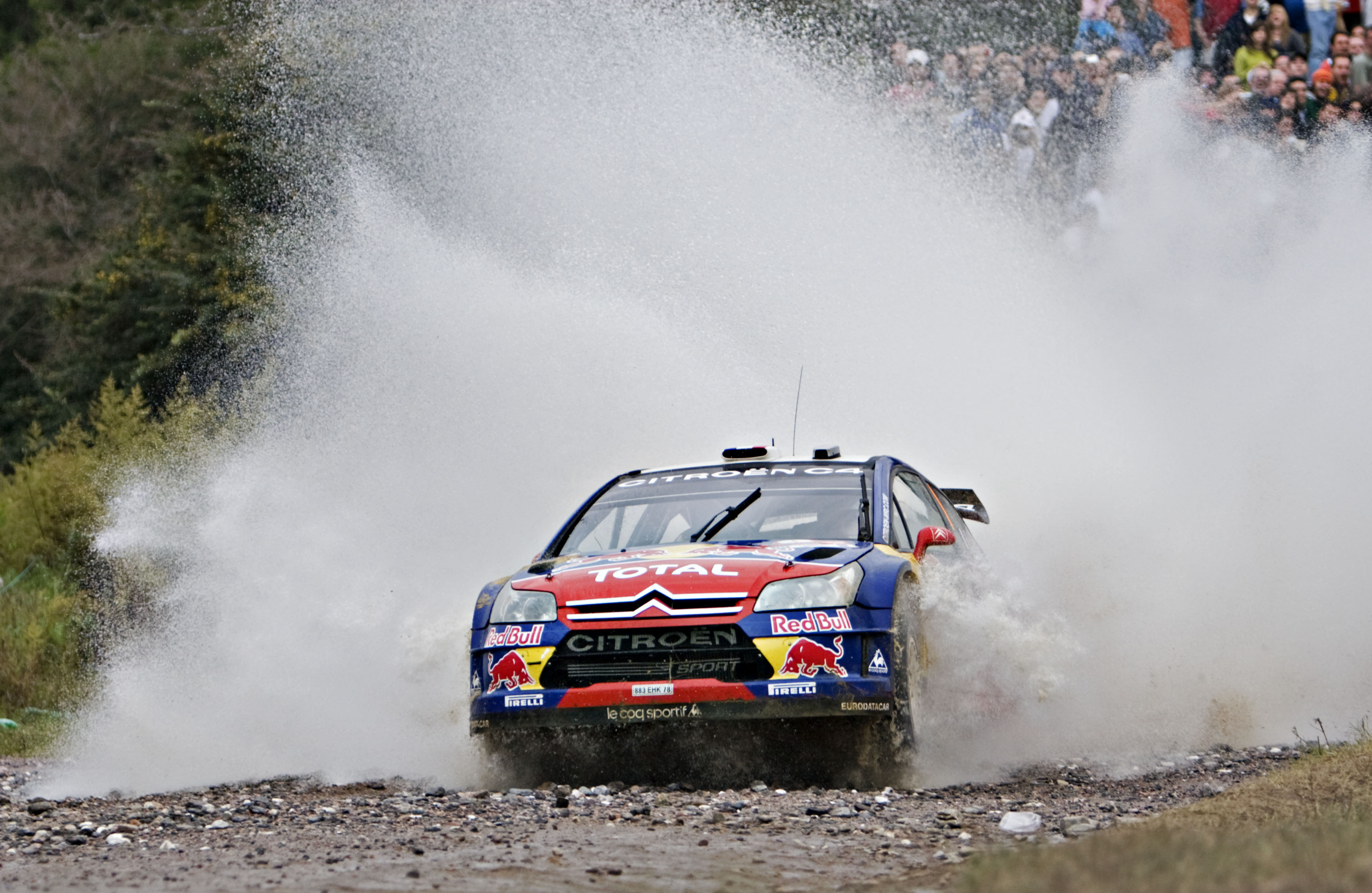
Loeb during the 2008 Rally Argentina

Going into the penultimate round of the season, the 2008 Rally Japan, Loeb led Hirvonen by 14 points and needed a third place to secure the world drivers' title. Finishing behind Ford's Hirvonen and Latvala, Loeb broke Juha Kankkunen's, Tommi Mäkinen's and his own record of four titles and became the first five-time world champion in rallying.

After clinching the World Rally Championship, Loeb edged out Latvala to take his first Wales Rally GB win, a feat which also helped secure his team their first manufacturers' title since 2005, from 2006 and 2007 victors Ford.

==== 2009 ====
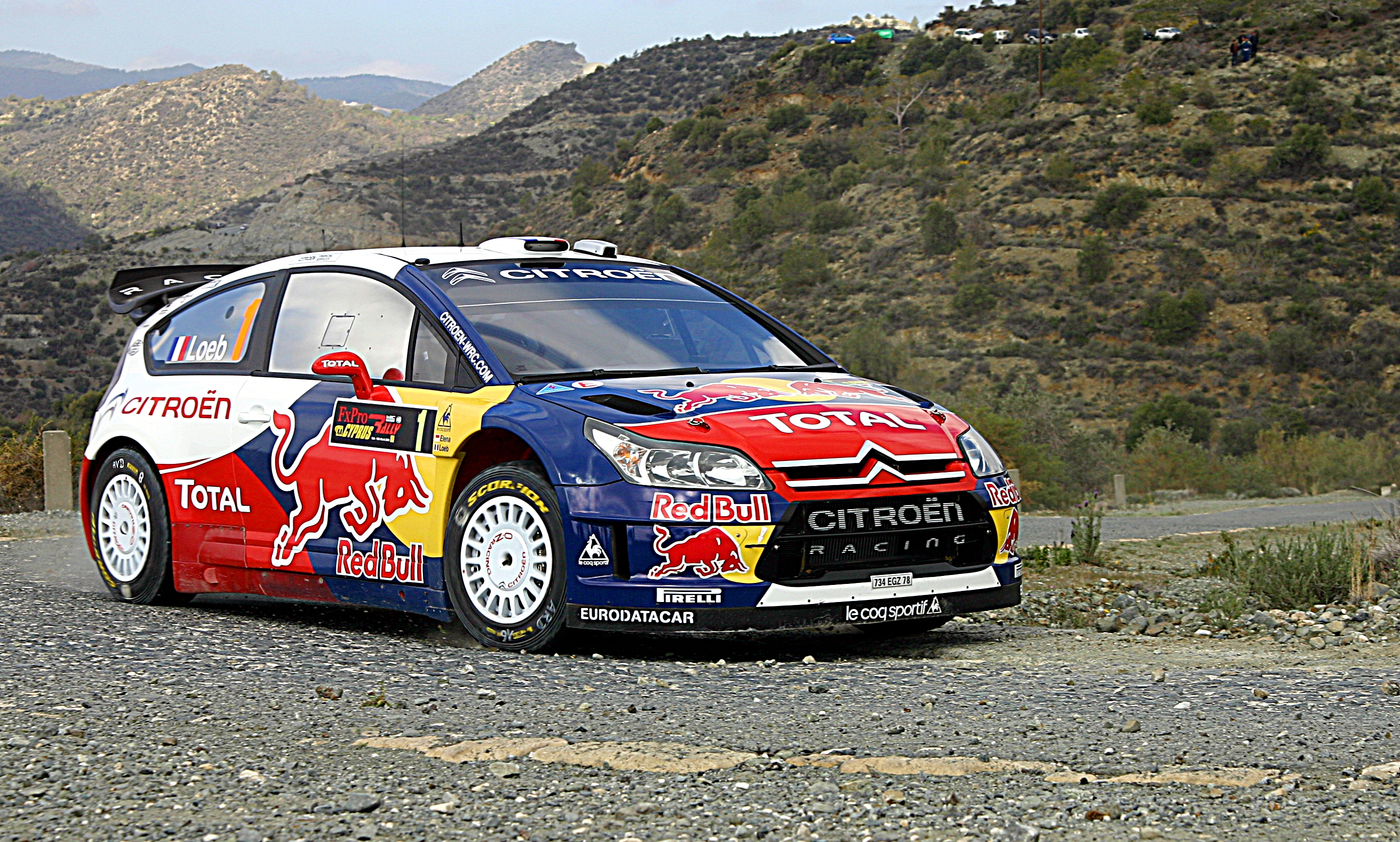
Loeb during the shakedown in Cyprus

Loeb started the year by winning Rally Ireland for the second time since 2007. He then won his first Rally Norway ever, after a fierce battle with Mikko Hirvonen, lasting throughout the very final stage. Being first on the road through all three days, Loeb kept his lead, in the end winning with 9.8 seconds over Hirvonen. Loeb continued his good form by winning over Hirvonen in Cyprus, marking his career 50th victory, and in Portugal. His victory in Argentina, the fifth in a row in this country, was also his fifth victory in a row since the start of the season.

At the Rally d'Italia Sardegna, Loeb had a puncture after going off the road and dropped from third to fourth. Although he passed Petter Solberg for the final podium spot, he still finished fourth due to a time penalty for a safety rule violation; co-driver Daniel Elena had unfastened his safety belts before the crew stopped the car for a tyre change. At the Acropolis Rally, Loeb crashed out from third place. On Rally Poland's return to the WRC, Loeb had another crash but he continued in the event under superally rules. After team orders issued for the Citroën Junior Team drivers and a late mistake by Ford's Jari-Matti Latvala, Loeb found himself seventh but had lost the championship lead to Hirvonen by one point.

By winning the Rally Catalunya, Loeb reduced the deficit to Hirvonen in the title race before the final event of the year; once again trailing by a single point. The Frenchman gained the championship by winning the final event of the year, the Rally GB. Victory was secured partly due to an incredible performance over SS8 and SS9, where in the course of only two stages Loeb extended his lead in the rally over Hirvonen from 2.4s to 25s.

==== 2010 ====
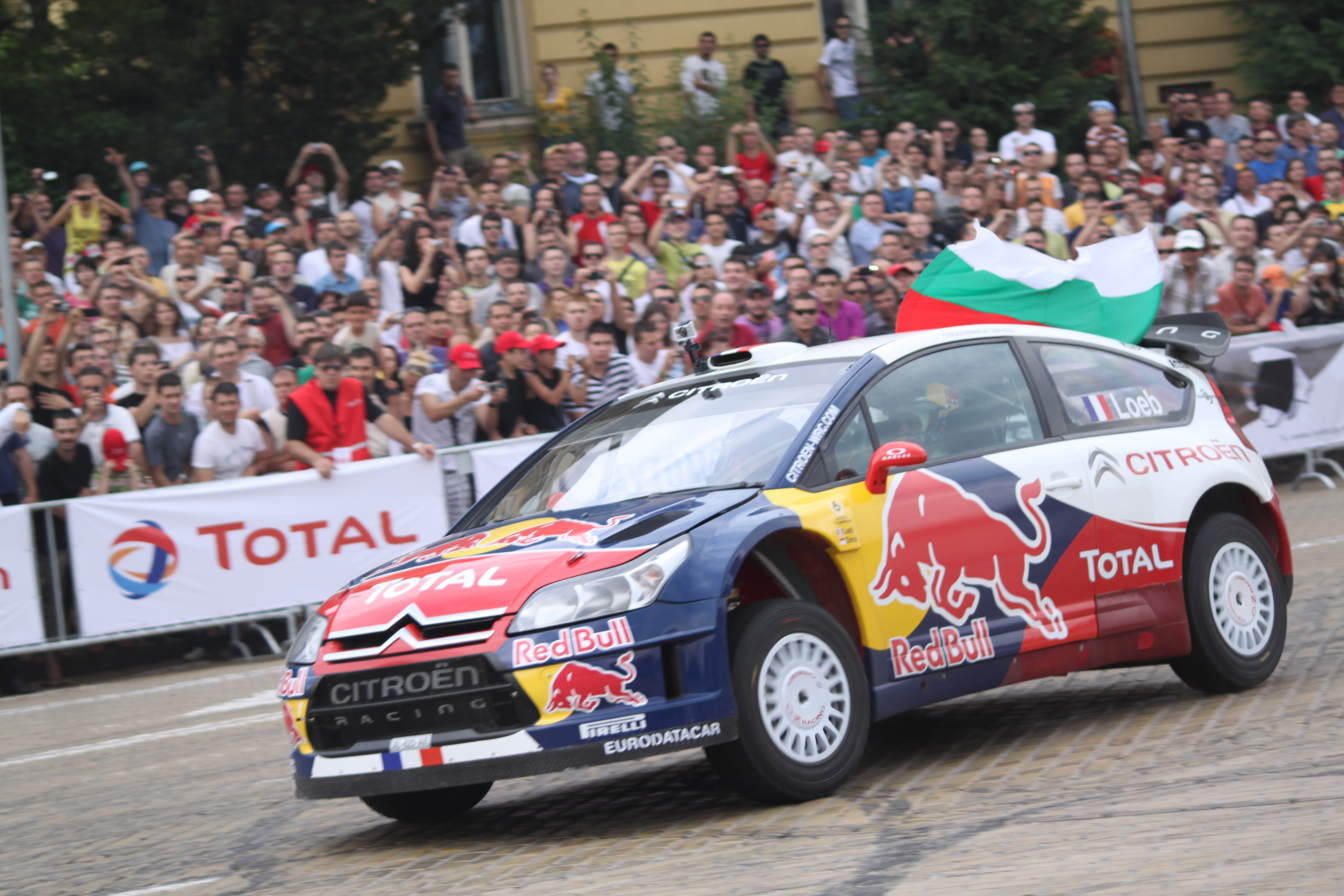
Loeb in Sofia before the 2010 Rally Bulgaria

The 2010 WRC season started with the snow-based Swedish Rally, where Loeb finished second behind Ford's Mikko Hirvonen. He went on to take a clear championship lead by winning the following three gravel events: Rally México, Jordan Rally and Rally of Turkey. In New Zealand, Loeb finished third in a tight battle that saw the top five finish within 26 seconds of each other. In Portugal, Loeb narrowly lost the win to his countryman Sébastien Ogier of the Citroën Junior Team, who took his debut win in the World Rally Championship. In the following Rally Bulgaria, a new event in the series and the season's first tarmac rally, Loeb won while Citroën scored the WRC's first 1–2–3–4 in seventeen years.

At the 60th Rally Finland, Loeb beat Citroën privateer Petter Solberg to the final podium position, behind Ford's Jari-Matti Latvala and Ogier. He went on to win the Rallye Deutschland for the eighth time in a row, marking the first time a driver has won a WRC rally eight times. After a fifth place in Japan, Loeb secured a record-extending seventh consecutive World Rally Championship title by winning his home event, the Rallye de France. As the Rallye de France–Alsace had replaced the Tour de Corse as the French round of the WRC, Loeb ended up clinching the title on a final stage that was held in his home town of Haguenau, Alsace.

During the course of the season, he was on the podium of all events but one (Japan where he finished fifth), and ended up the season with a record 105 points over runner-up Jari-Matti Latvala.

==== 2011 ====
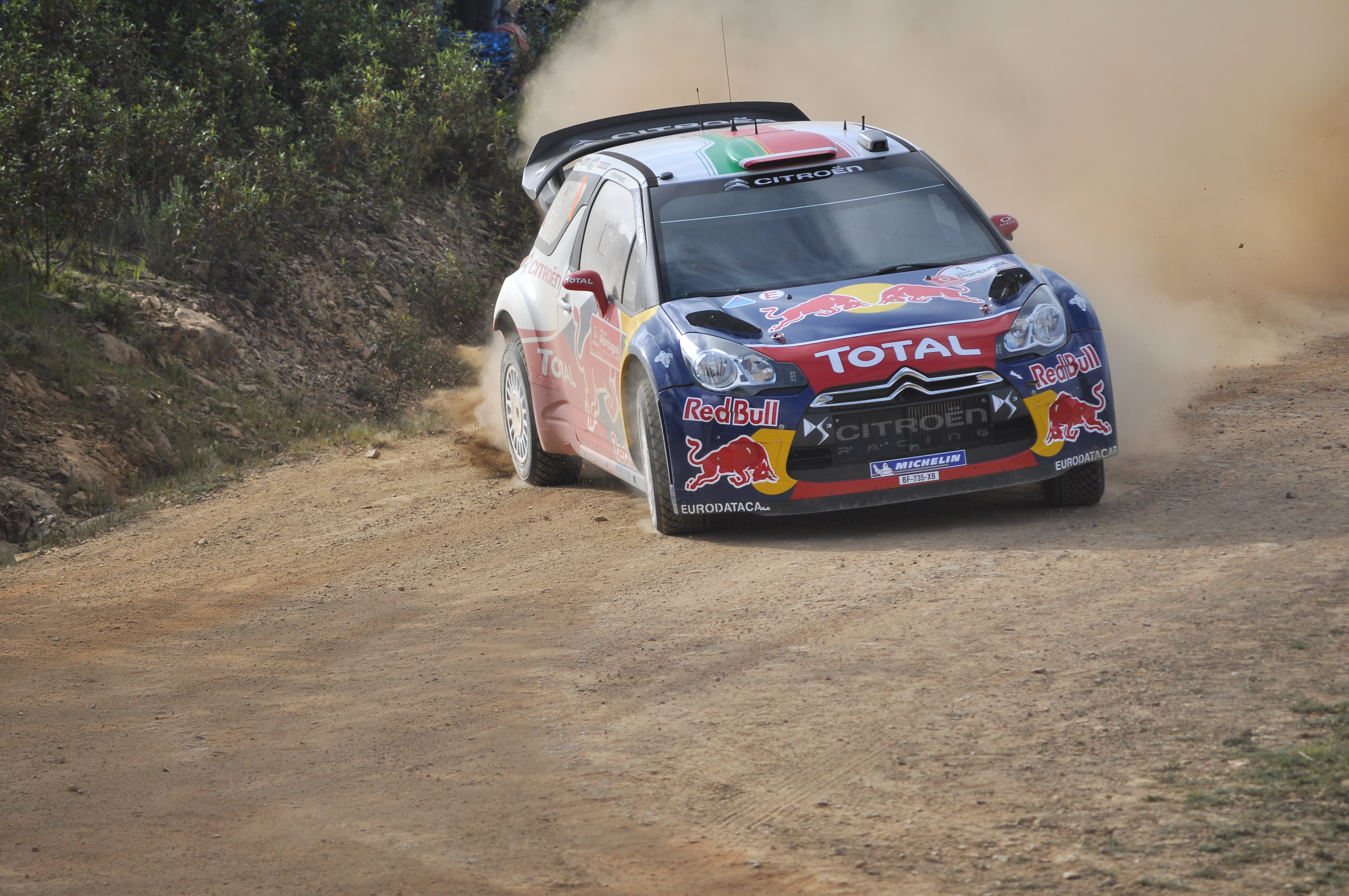
Loeb at the 2011 Rally de Portugal

The 2011 season brought a new generation of World Rally Cars. Now at the wheel of a Citroën DS3 WRC, Loeb started his year by finishing sixth at the Rally Sweden. He went on to win in Mexico for the fifth time in row, after teammate Sébastien Ogier crashed out from a narrow lead. In Portugal, Loeb finished second to Ogier and took his first Power Stage win, collecting three more points from the final stage. At the Jordan Rally, held during the Arab Spring, the entire first day was cancelled. Loeb placed third behind the closest-ever finish in the history of the World Rally Championship. He then beat Ford's Mikko Hirvonen to the win at the Rally d'Italia Sardegna.

In Argentina, Loeb won after a tight three-way battle, taking the lead from Ogier on the final stage and finishing 2.4 seconds ahead of Hirvonen. At the next event, the Acropolis Rally in Greece, Loeb had to settle for second behind Ogier. In the high-speed Rally Finland, he beat Jari-Matti Latvala to become the first non-Nordic driver to win twice in the event's 60-year history. In August, Loeb signed a two-year contract extension with Citroën. At the Rallye Deutschland, Loeb held a close lead ahead of Ogier after the first day and Citroën decided to freeze the situation. A puncture later dropped Loeb out of contention and he finished behind his teammate. This ended his record win streak in Germany and was the first time that he had lost in a tarmac-based event since the 2006 Monte Carlo Rally. Tension in the team grew; David Evans of Autosport wrote that "it's war between the two Sebs".

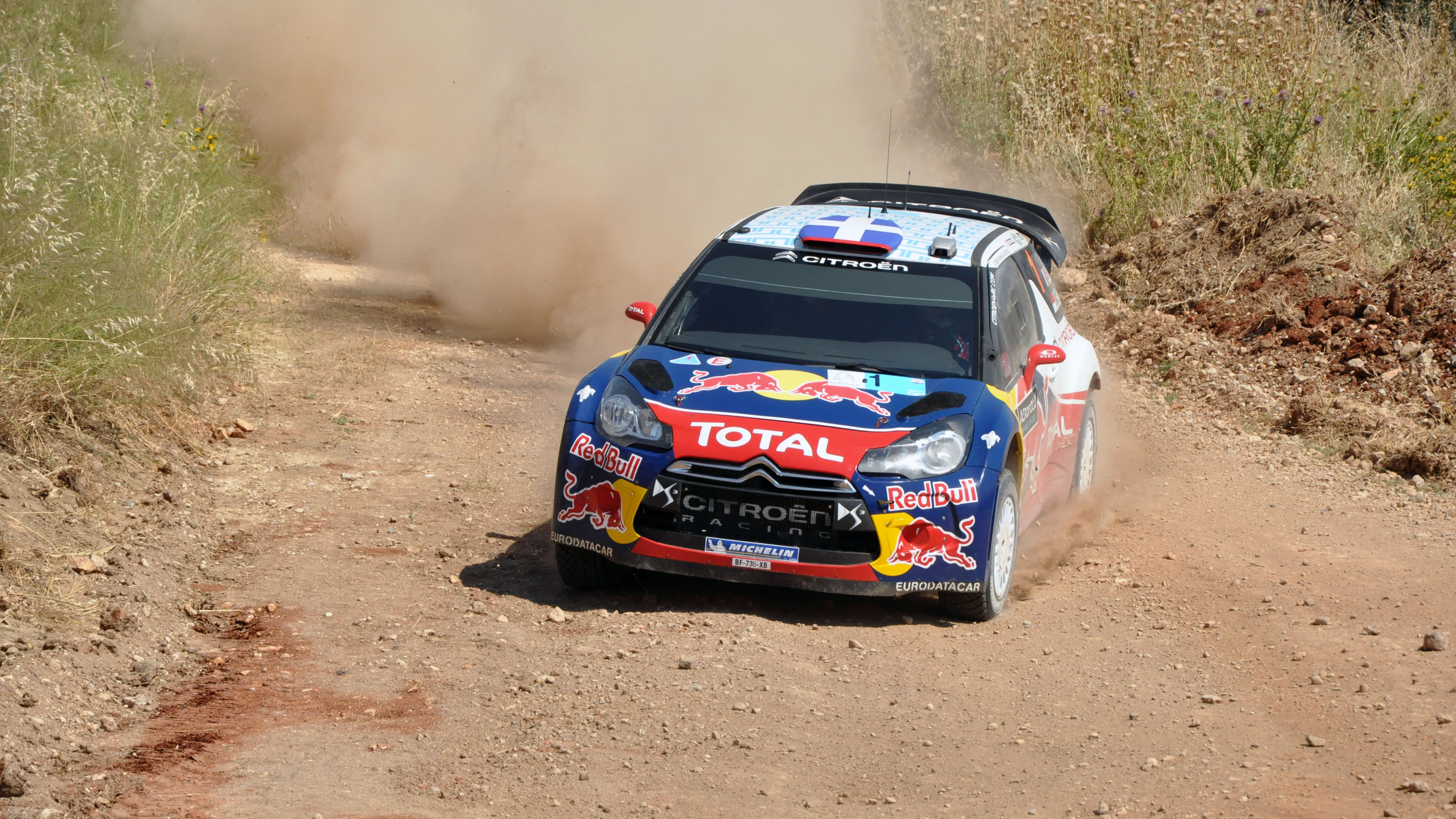
Loeb at the Acropolis Rally

Before Australia, Loeb held a 25-point lead in the championship ahead of Ogier. During the first day of the rally, both Sébastiens crashed out. Loeb later gained a point by climbing to tenth place after Citroën ordered Ogier to slow down. In his home event, the Rallye de France, Loeb took the lead from the start but soon fell victim to a rare engine failure in his DS3 WRC and had to retire. As Ogier beat Mini's Dani Sordo to the win, Loeb now tied the lead in the championship with Hirvonen, and Ogier was only three points adrift. At the Rally Catalunya, Loeb took his fifth win of the season and broke Markku Alén's record (801) for most stage wins in the world championship. He carried an eight-point lead over Hirvonen into the season-ending Wales Rally GB. Loeb took the rally lead from Latvala on the third stage, but lost it to Hirvonen by 0.4 seconds on stage six. However, Hirvonen soon went wide, spun and broke his radiator, which in turn caused severe engine problems. As Hirvonen was unable to restart, Loeb secured his eighth consecutive world championship. This title moved him ahead of seven-time champion Michael Schumacher in terms of major motorsport championships won. While running in second place behind Latvala, Loeb retired from the rally due to a road section collision with a spectator who had driven his car on the wrong side of a narrow road.

During the 2011 season, Loeb also won the Monza Rally Show in a Citroën DS3 WRC.

==== 2012 ====
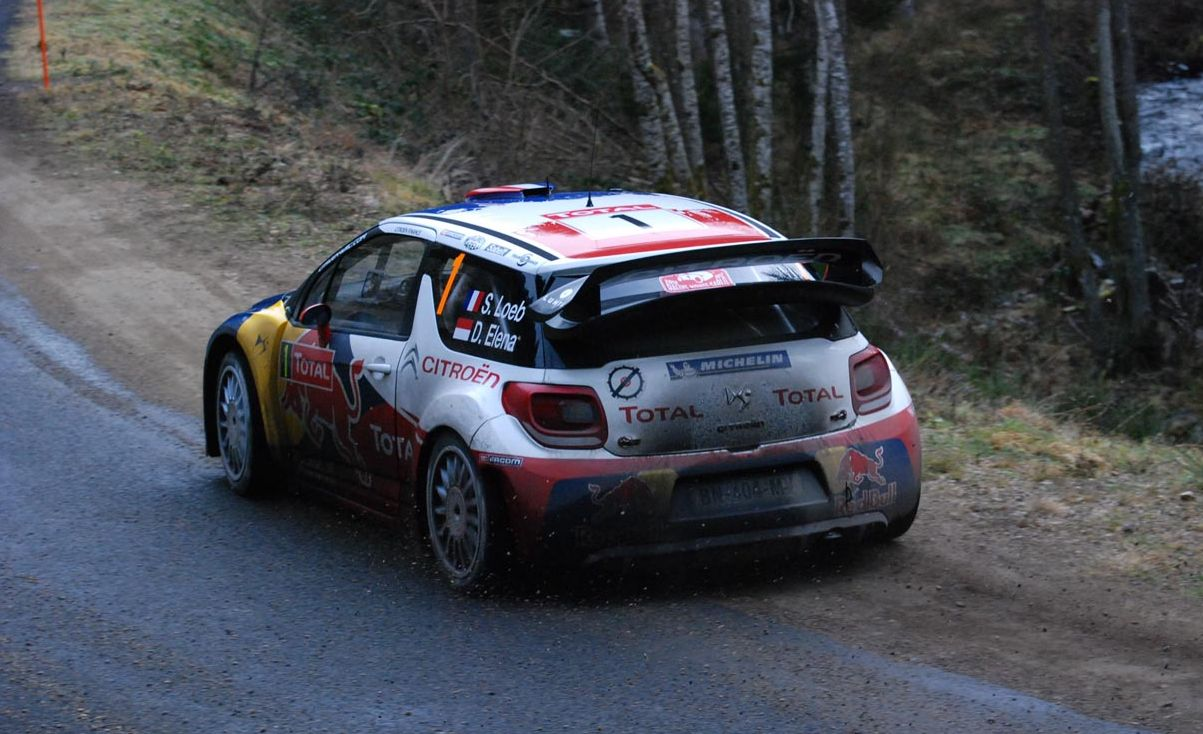
Loeb at the 2012 Monte Carlo Rally

Loeb began his 2012 season by beating Mini's Dani Sordo to a record sixth win in the Monte Carlo Rally. He also secured the maximum points by recording the fastest time for the power stage. In Sweden, after hitting a snowbank on stage seven, Loeb was forced out of the fight for the number one spot. He finished sixth and gained three extra points by again winning the power stage. Loeb took his second victory of the season at the Rally Mexico, ahead of his new teammate Mikko Hirvonen. In Portugal, he crashed out from third place on the night stages of the first day, after misunderstanding a pacenote. The Rally Argentina was dominated by the Citroëns and Loeb drove to his 70th WRC victory. At the Acropolis Rally in Greece, he cruised to an easy win after Ford's Jari-Matti Latvala and Petter Solberg ran into several problems and dropped out of contention.

Loeb went on to continue his WRC win streak in New Zealand and in Finland, where he edged out Hirvonen to take his third win in the event. This marked the fourth double win in a row for the Citroën duo. After beating Latvala to the win in Germany, Loeb finished second to the Finn at the Wales Rally GB, after a tight battle for the position with Solberg.

In late September, Loeb announced his retirement from full-time rallying, stating that he would compete only in selected events during the upcoming season. He added that he is interested in taking on a new challenge such as the World Touring Car Championship. In his home event, the Rallye de France, Loeb built a cushion over Latvala and title rival Hirvonen on the first two days. He then held Latvala at bay on the wet roads on Sunday, securing a record ninth drivers' title in the World Rally Championship and aiding Citroën to its eighth manufacturers' title. German magazine Auto Bild noted that Loeb was now two world championship titles clear of Schumacher and equal to Valentino Rossi, and dubbed him "the best rally driver of all time and a shining light in motorsport." Former world champion Ari Vatanen opined that Loeb's records are unlikely to be broken.

==== 2013 ====
Loeb competed in five rallies of the 2013 season: Monte Carlo, Sweden, Argentina, Germany and France. He started his partial WRC season with a win in Monte Carlo, and finished last to Sébastien Ogier in Sweden, followed by another win in Argentina. Ahead of his home rally in France, it has been speculated it could be his WRC swansong. It was confirmed on 1 October 2013 as Loeb will continue racing for Citroën, this time for World Touring Car Championship. However, Loeb crashed out on the first stage of day three. The rally was eventually won by Sebastien Ogier.

==== 2014–20 ====
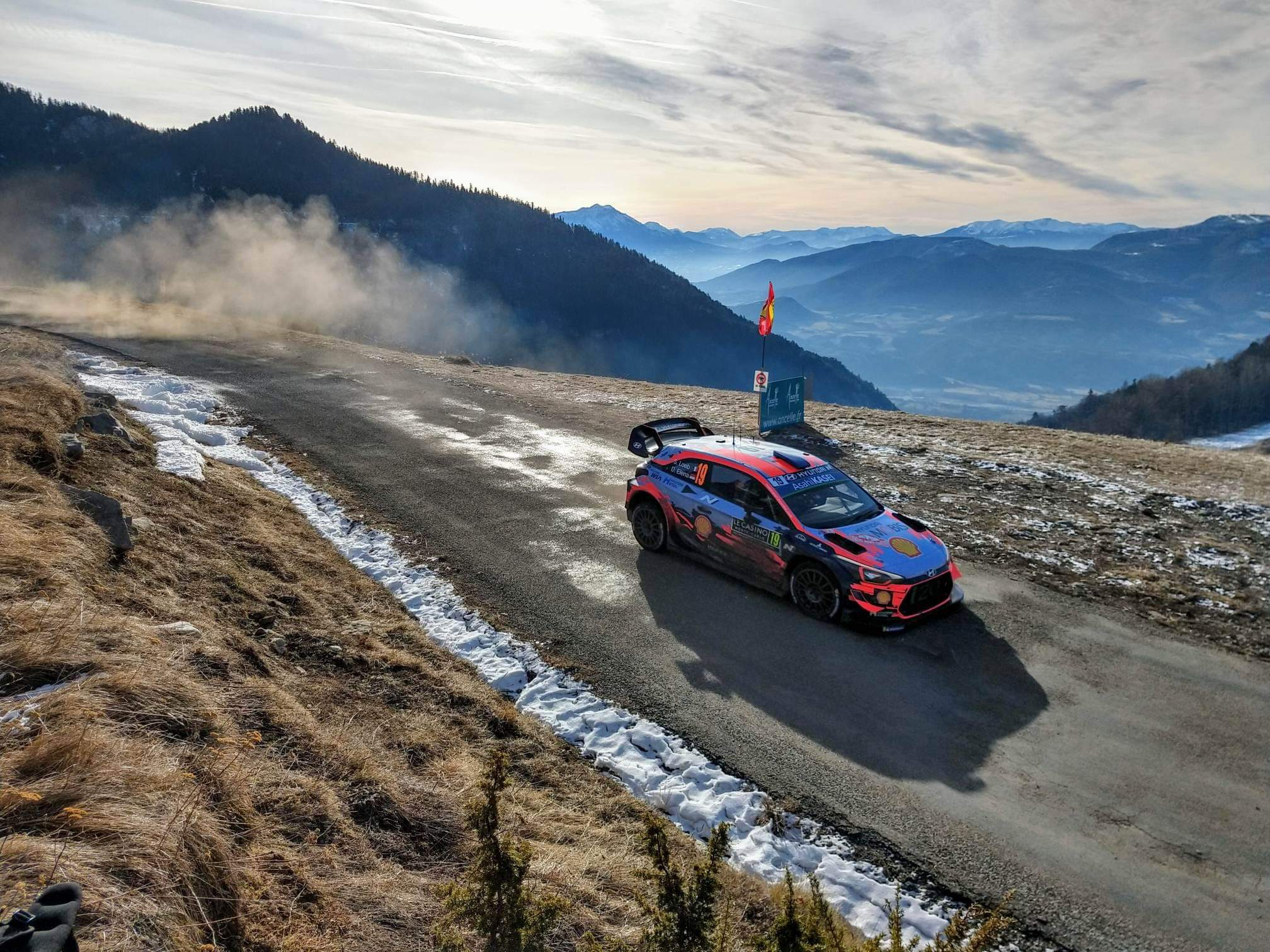
Loeb and Elena at the 2019 Monte Carlo Rally, driving the Hyundai i20 Coupe WRC.

In 2014 Loeb set the fastest time at the Goodwood Festival of Speed with his Peugeot 208 T16 Pikes Peak. Returning to the WRC after being absent in 2014, in 2015 Loeb participated in the Monte Carlo Rally and finished eighth after a crash. In 2016 and 2017, he did not contest any rounds.

Loeb drove three rounds in 2018 and won his last rally with Citroën, the Rally Catalunya.

Loeb signed to race part time with the Hyundai World Rally Team for the 2019 season. He got one podium in the Rally Chile and participated in six rounds. He closed out 2019 with a win at the non-championship rally, the Rallye du Var with his partner Laurène Godey as his co-driver.

In 2020, Loeb continued with Hyundai and finished sixth at the Monte Carlo Rally and got a podium at Turkey, which were the only two rounds he entered in that season.

On 1 October 2020, Loeb announced that he would be leaving Hyundai World Rally Team. He did not participate in the WRC in 2021.

==== 2021 ====
On 29 November 2021, Loeb's co-driver Daniel Elena announced his retirement.

Loeb then tested the Ford Puma Rally1 for M Sport, later announcing that would compete for the British squad part time in the WRC with new co-driver Isabelle Galmiche.

==== 2022 ====
At the Monte Carlo Rally, Loeb participated alongside Isabelle Galmiche for M-Sport Ford World Rally Team, barely having recovered from the Dakar Rally and with very little time behind the wheel of a WRC car since 2018. He battled his former rival Sébastien Ogier (co-driver Benjamin Veillas) all rally long, till Ogier got a puncture in the penultimate stage. At the final stage Loeb led by 9.5s, and Ogier got a 10-second penalty for a jumpstart. Loeb won his 80th WRC rally by 10.5s over Ogier, first for a manufacturer other than Citroën World Rally Team and his first with a co-driver other than Daniel Elena. He also became the oldest driver to lead and win a WRC Rally. Galmiche became the first woman co-driver to win a WRC event since Fabrizia Pons in 1997.

At the Rally de Portugal, Loeb and Galmiche were 10.1 seconds behind rally leader Elfyn Evans (co-driver Scott Martin) in SS3, but won the next stage and took 10.6 seconds out of their deficit; therefore putting them in the overall rally lead by 0.5 seconds over Evans. At the first corner of SS5 though, Loeb slid wide into a barrier, completely destroying his rear-right suspension. On Saturday, Loeb had another mechanical issue which forced him to retire.

The next rally they took part in was the Safari Rally. The last time Loeb participated in that rally before 2022 was in 2002. Loeb and Galmiche had good speed and even managed to win a stage on Friday, but Loeb's engine had a small fire and wouldn't start up later. They retired for the day. Even though they were out of contention, they won two more stages on Sunday and ultimately recovered to eighth place.

Loeb and Galmiche then took part in the Acropolis Rally, where they ran for the lead alongside M Sport teammate Pierre-Louis Loubet (co driver Vincent Landais). Both crews traded stage wins, but Loeb was leading with Friday done. On the next day though, Loeb again encountered issues and had to retire.

==== 2023 ====
Loeb alongside his partner and co-driver Laurène Godey won the Azores Rallye on their first attempt, in a Škoda Fabia RS Rally2.

=== Dakar Rally and Rally Raid ===
==== 2016 ====
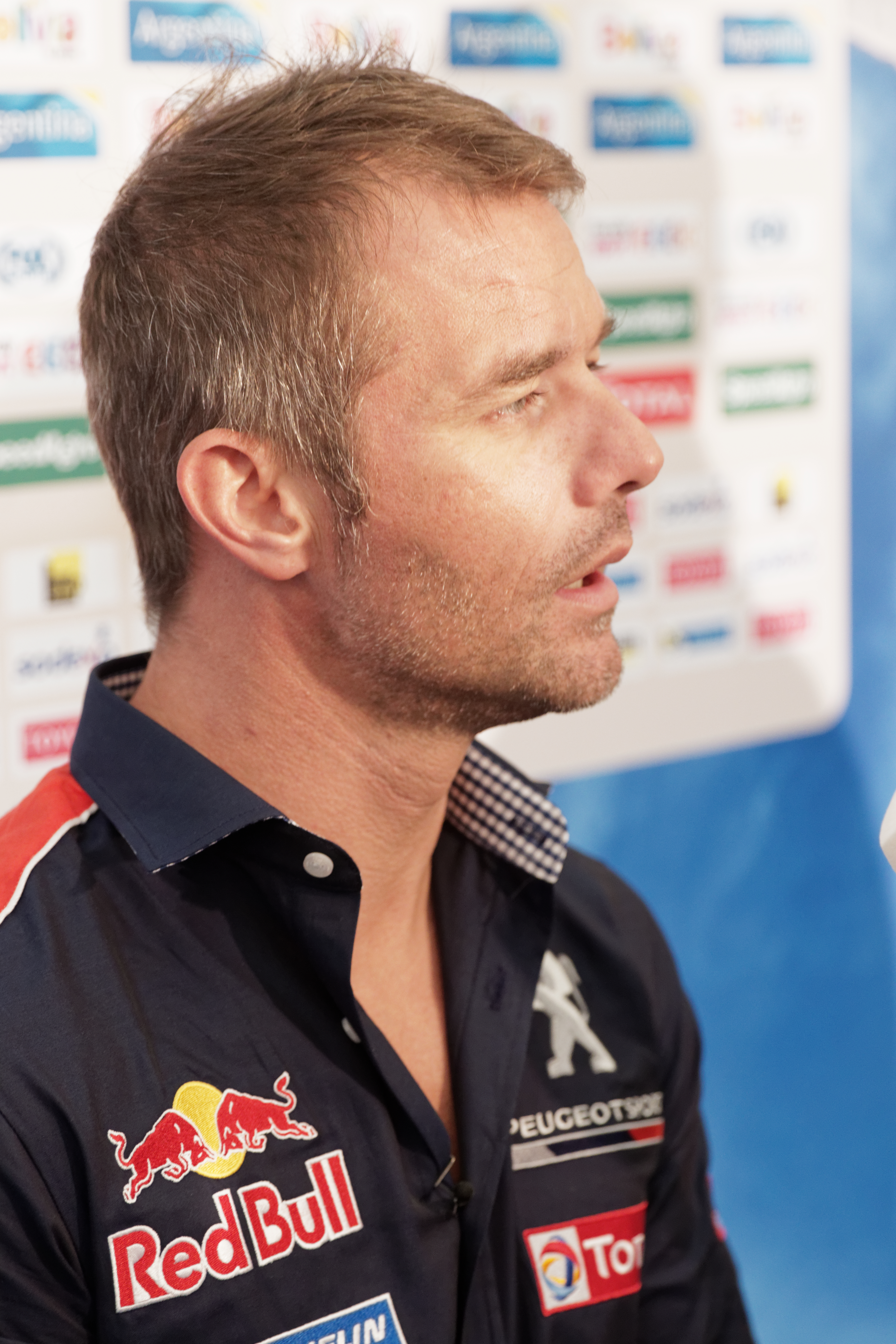
Loeb at the Press Conference for the 2016 Dakar Rally.

Loeb made his debut at the 2016 Dakar Rally in the Peugeot 2008 DKR. He led the rally by seven minutes and 48 seconds but lost the lead to teammate Stéphane Peterhansel by over eight minutes in SS6. Peterhansel won the event. Loeb won four stages and finished ninth, over two hours and 22 minutes from the lead.

==== 2017 ====
At the 2017 Silk Way Rally, Loeb had to abandon due to a finger injury which he had sustained in stage 9. He had been leading the overall standings up to that point.

Loeb also took his career best finish of second at the 2017 Dakar Rally by winning five stages and just five minutes from the leader, Stéphane Peterhansel.

==== 2018 ====
Loeb retired on day five of the 2018 Dakar Rally and could not continue any further as his co-driver Daniel Elena had a tailbone injury. Prior to the retirement he had won only one stage, SS4.

==== 2019 ====
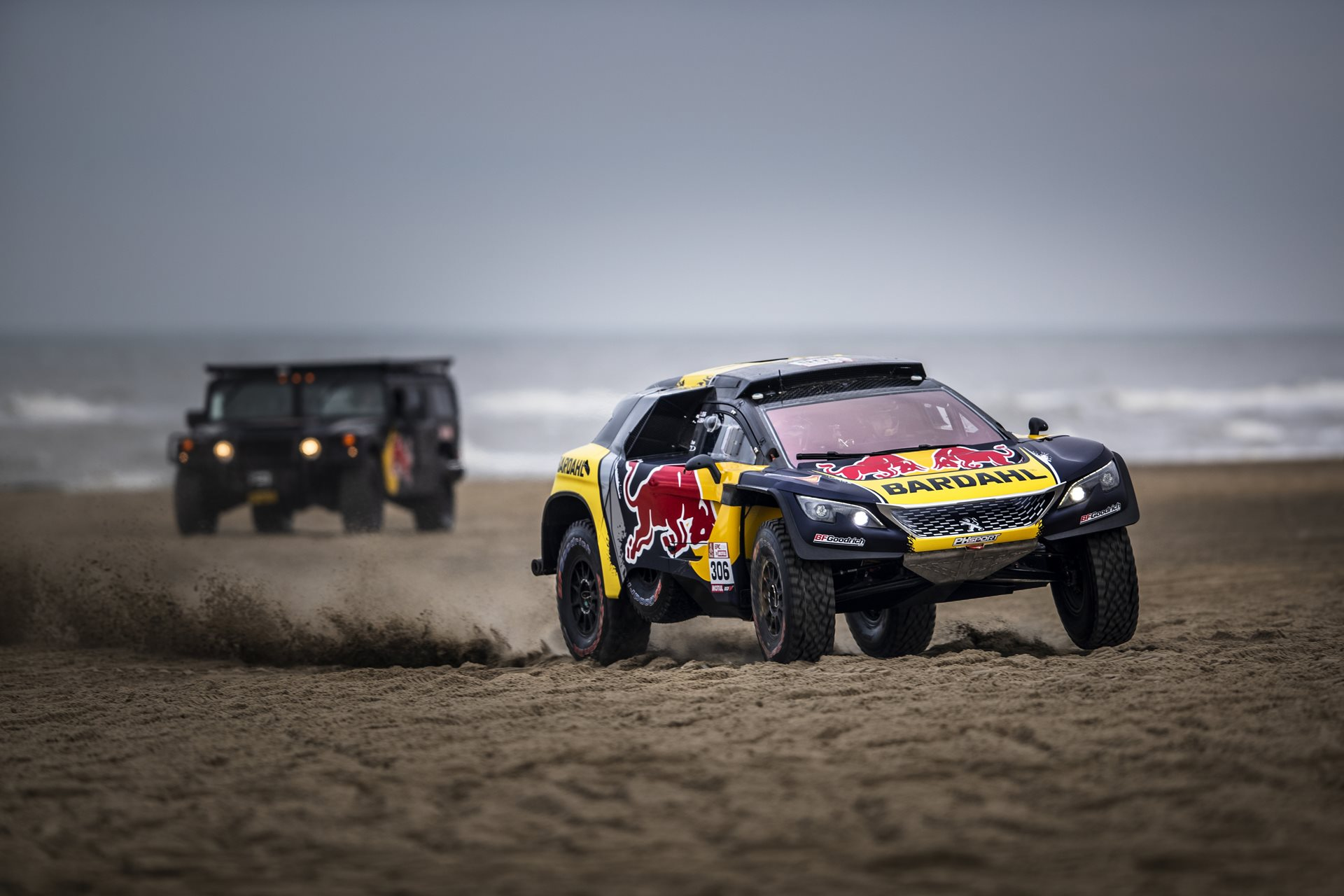
Loeb and Elena at the 2019 Dakar Rally, driving the Peugeot 3008 DKR.

Peugeot withdrew from World Rallycross and from Rally-Raid hence at the 2019 Dakar Rally Loeb and Elena competed with a private Red Bull backed 2017 Peugeot 3008 DKR. They finished third with four stage wins, one hour and 54 minutes away from winner Nasser Al-Attiyah.

==== 2020 ====
Loeb did not compete in the 2020 Dakar Rally. He announced in December that year that he would return in 2021 with the Prodrive run Bahrain Raid Xtreme team.

==== 2021 ====
At the 2021 Dakar Rally, Loeb made his debut for the Prodrive run Bahrain Raid Xtreme Team. He received a five-minute penalty for speeding in SS4, which left him furious. He retired in SS8 after getting two punctures and being stranded for five hours. He also experienced many navigation issues with his co driver Daniel Elena. Later that year, Elena and Loeb announced that they had split.

==== 2022 ====
Loeb took part in the inaugural World Rally-Raid Championship (W2RC) this time with new co-driver, Belgian Fabian Lurquin; again driving the BRX Hunter.

They began the year at the Dakar Rally, finishing second to Toyota Gazoo Racing's Nasser Al-Attiyah and Mathieu Baumel by 27 minutes and 48 seconds; even in spite of many mechanical issues and punctures.

At the Abu Dhabi Desert Challenge, they finished sixth overall after having a driveshaft failure on day 1 and two punctures on day 5, the final day. The transmission broke on the first day, but their determination to finish meant that they scored valuable points. In the last stage, they had two punctures and drove cautiously for the last 200 km. They still managed to score 28 points, bringing the total to 112 and led the W2RC standings by one point from Al Attiyah and Baumel.

At the Rallye du Maroc, Loeb and Lurquin ran among the leading times, but in Stage 4 encountered a mechanical issue they couldn't fix, and hence dropped back in the overall rally standings. They continued to run the rally for earning points in the W2RC standings. They finished the rally with two stage wins.

Loeb earned his first victory in the rally-raid discipline on the Andalucia Rally, but finished second in the overall championship obtaining a total of 149 points, 20 points behind Al-Attiyah, who won the title.

==== 2023 ====
Loeb entered the second season of the World Rally-Raid Championship in 2023, driving an upgraded BRX Hunter.

Loeb kicked off the year by finishing second again behind Toyota Gazoo Racing's Nasser Al-Attiyah and Mathieu Baumel, with the final deficit to car #200 being 1 hour, 20 minutes and 49 seconds. He won seven stages in total with six consecutive stage victories from stage 8 to 13, which is a Dakar Rally record. Loeb bounced back from suffering massive time losses on stage 2, where his BRX Hunter suffered multiple punctures, despite receiving a spare wheel from teammate Orlando Terranova. He also lost time with mechanical issues, with a tradrod breakage on stage 3 and a minor crash on stage 5, from which he was able to recover from and continue. Overheating problems at the start of the Abu Dhabi Desert Challenge set the Frenchman back, and he would virtually fall out of title contention with a crash at the Sonora Rally in Mexico.

=== Racing ===
==== Le Mans and sports cars ====
As his WRC stature grew, Loeb began to participate in road racing events and tests. He first competed in the 24 Hours of Le Mans sports car race in 2005, where he drove for the Pescarolo Sport team's No. 17 entry. Reportedly, Loeb did much of his preparation for the race by running practice laps around the circuit in the Sony PlayStation 2 video game Gran Turismo 4 aboard a private jet. In the race, the car was plagued by incidents, but Loeb proved to be able to drive fast for his first race on a closed track. Loeb finished second overall in the 2006 24 Hours of Le Mans in a Pescarolo-Judd, between the two Diesel-powered Audi R10.

Free time in his WRC schedule allowed Loeb to race in the French GT Championship (FFSA GT) where he drove a Ferrari 550 Prodrive and a Porsche 911 GT3-RSR as well as in the French Carrera Cup where he achieved top-10 finishes. For 2012, he launched Sébastien Loeb Racing which competes in FFSA GT and the European Le Mans Series. Loeb drove for his own team at the Circuit de Pau in the French Carrera Cup and won the race.

==== Formula One ====
Loeb has had a number of Formula One tests. He first tested for Renault F1 at Paul Ricard in December 2007, in a switch that saw Heikki Kovalainen test Loeb's WRC car. Red Bull, which became a major sponsor of the Citroën factory team during the 2008 season, rewarded Loeb for winning the WRC with a Formula One test in Red Bull Racing's 2008-spec Red Bull RB4. He first drove the car at Silverstone, and then took part in the first official Formula One winter test in Barcelona. Loeb was eighth quickest of 17 drivers.

Loeb continued to set his sights on a switch to Formula One in 2009. Following stories that fellow Frenchman Sébastien Bourdais was under threat at Toro Rosso, Loeb told French newspaper L'Équipe that he was interested in replacing Bourdais at the Red Bull-backed team. He intended to make his F1 debut at the 2009 Abu Dhabi Grand Prix which took place in November, after the WRC season finished, with a view to making the switch full-time for 2010. However, this plan was scuppered when he was not granted an FIA Super Licence, rendering him ineligible to race in F1 for the foreseeable future as he had not done enough circuit racing at lower levels. He had also been in contact with the US F1 Team about a possible drive for 2010.

Loeb has also taken part in an official GP2 Series testing session after the 2009 season, where he drove for the David Price Racing team, finishing last of 25 drivers.

==== FIA GT Series and Porsche Supercup ====
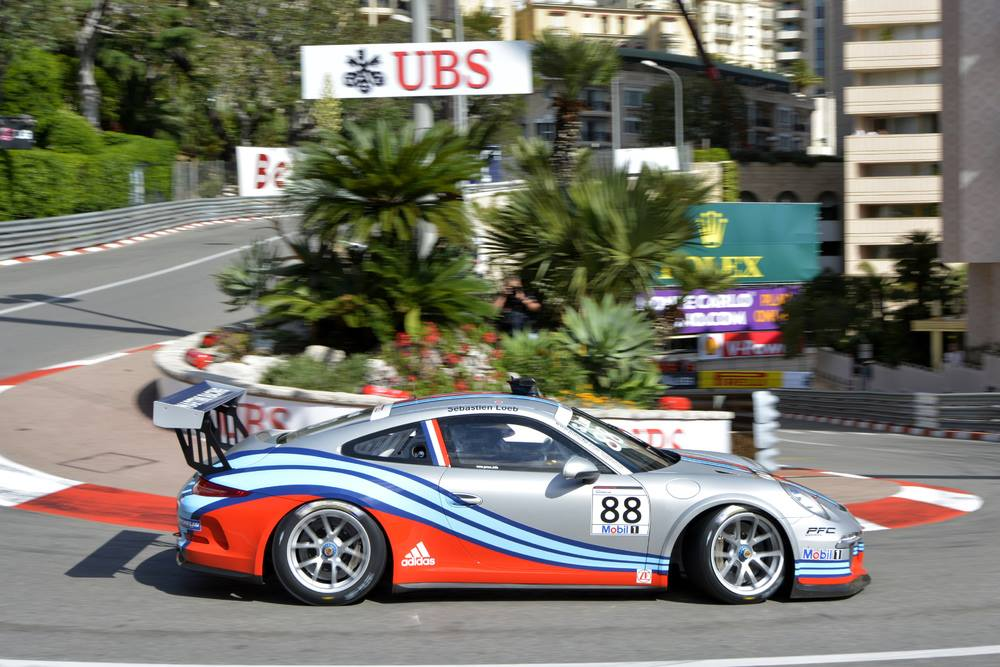
Loeb at the 2013 Porsche Supercup's Monaco Round.

Loeb participated in the 2013 FIA GT Series season, driving for Sébastien Loeb Racing which entered two McLaren MP4-12C cars. Loeb paired up with Portuguese driver Álvaro Parente in one of the cars while Frenchman Mike Parisy and Austrian Andreas Zuber were the driver pairing for the other Sébastien Loeb Racing car. Loeb and Parente took a total of three qualifying race wins and one championship race win on their way to fourth place overall in the season. A number of reliability issues and racing incidents prevented the pair from scoring more victories.

Loeb also participated in two races of the 2013 Porsche Supercup season at the Circuit de Barcelona-Catalunya and Circuit de Monaco circuits, both events being held as support category races for the 2013 Formula One season. Loeb finished 11th in Spain and 16th in Monaco.

==== World Touring Car Championship ====
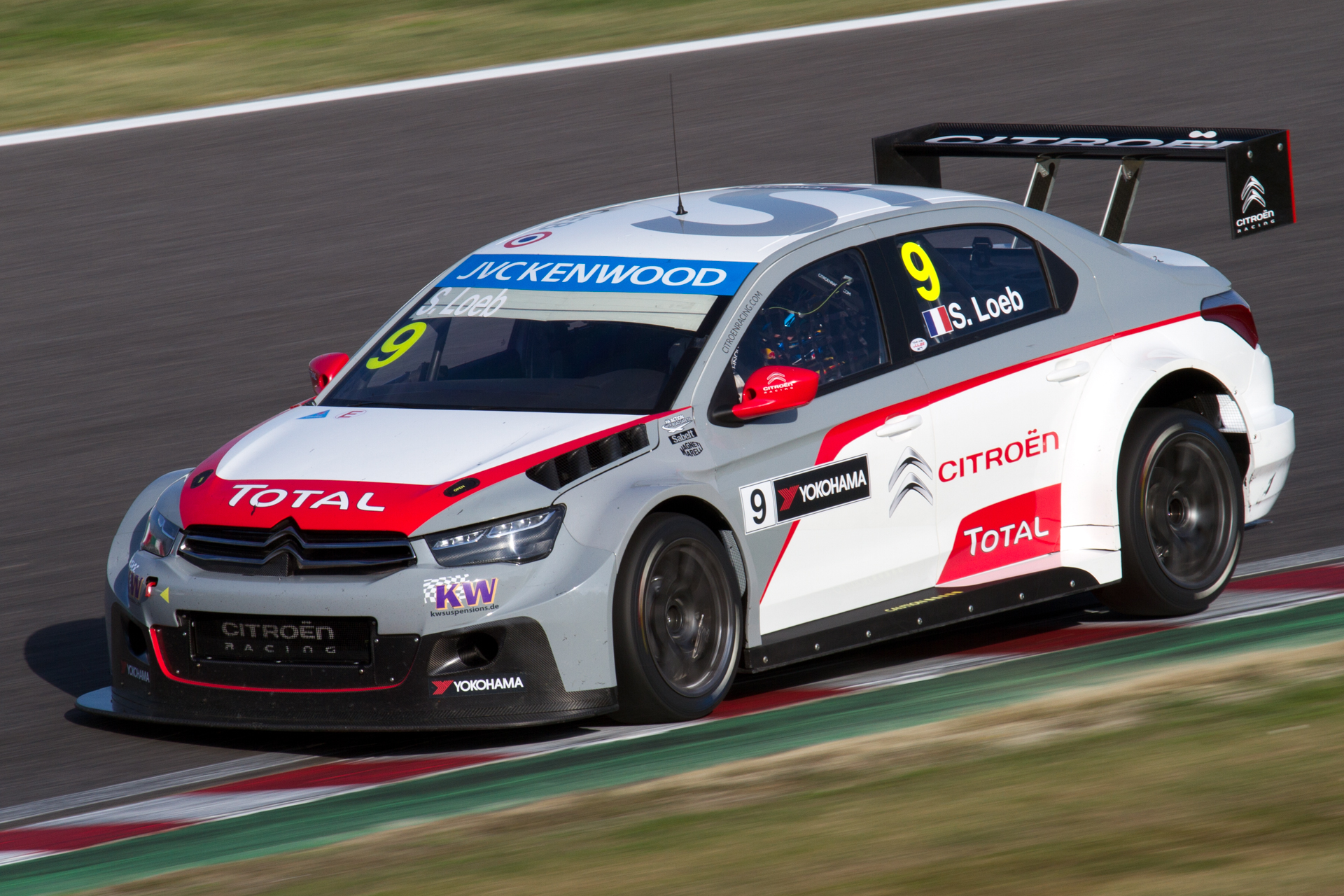
Loeb driving the Citroën C-Elysée WTCC at the 2014 Race of Japan.

In June 2013, it was confirmed that Citroën were to enter the FIA World Touring Car Championship in 2014 with Loeb driving one of the factory supported cars built for new to 2014 regulations. He was partnered by four-time WTCC champion, ten-time ice racing champion and fellow Frenchman Yvan Muller, José María López and Ma Qing Hua. In his first full season in circuit racing, Loeb won two races and scored six podiums on his way to third in the championship behind surprise champion Lopez and runner-up Muller. In the next season, he scored four wins and twelve podiums; again finishing third overall though with 61 more points. For the following season, contesting the Dakar Rally meant Loeb switched to Peugeot Sport and was not retained by Citroën for the 2016 WTCC season; which he expressed surprise at as he was hoping to contest for the WTCC title that season.

==== FIA World Rallycross Championship ====
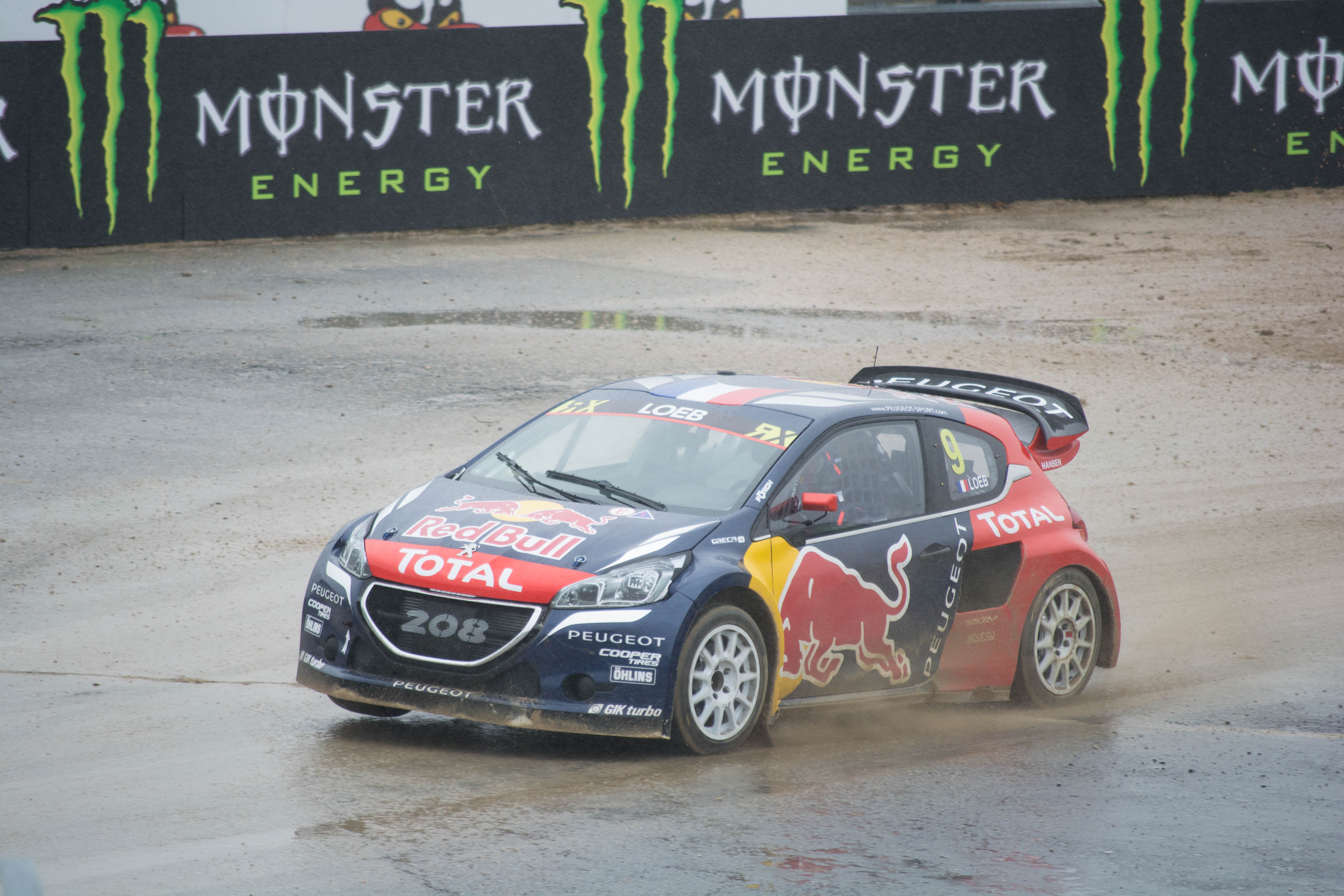
Loeb at the 2016 World RX of Portugal, driving the Peugeot 208 WRX.

On 29 February 2016, it was officially revealed that Loeb is going to join the factory backed Swedish Team Peugeot-Hansen to participate in all 12 rounds of the 2016 FIA World Rallycross Championship, together with his Swedish teammate Timmy Hansen. On 2 October, Loeb took his maiden victory in the Latvian round of the world championship. With four podiums and six top fives, he finished fifth in the Supercar class drivers standings. In the next season, he scored six podiums but no wins and finished fourth overall. In his final season, he scored his last win at the World RX of Belgium. He scored seven podiums in total and again finished fourth overall, with 15 more points than the previous season. He returned with Team Special One in 2023, but before the 2023 World RX of Britain, his car set on fire, destroying his, his teammate Guerlane Chicherit and the team's truck, ruling them all out of the rest of the season.

==== Extreme E ====
===== 2021 =====
In 2020, Loeb Signed with Lewis Hamilton's Team X44 for competing in the Extreme E Championship alongside Spanish driver Cristina Gutiérrez. They finished the season in second behind Rosberg X Racing's Johan Kristoffersson and Molly Taylor. The teams were level on points but RXR were ahead by virtue of their three wins to X44's one win.

===== 2022 =====
A few days after the 2022 Monte Carlo Rally it was announced that Team X44 retained their lineup of Loeb and Gutiérrez for the 2022 Extreme E Championship.

They won the Copper X-Prix, bringing them within contention of the title again.

At the Energy X-Prix, Gutiérrez crashed and had to change the chassis, resulting in a penalty. Nonetheless, X44 won the crazy race, enabling them to race the final. Their rivals Rosberg X Racing did not make it to the final. X44 scored five crucial points in the Continental Traction Challenge, and ran fourth during the race, but were promoted to third due to the car ahead getting a Switch Zone speeding penalty. They therefore won the title by two points over RXR.

Loeb and Gutiérrez finished the season with one win, four podiums, one pole and 86 points overall.

==== DTM ====
Loeb announced he would make a one-off appearance for AlphaTauri AF Corse alongside Felipe Fraga in the DTM Series at their 2022 season opener at the Algarve International Circuit.

Loeb was replacing Nick Cassidy who had to race in Formula E. Loeb finished 16th in Race 1 and 18th in Race 2.

=== Other ventures ===
==== Pikes Peak Hill Climb ====
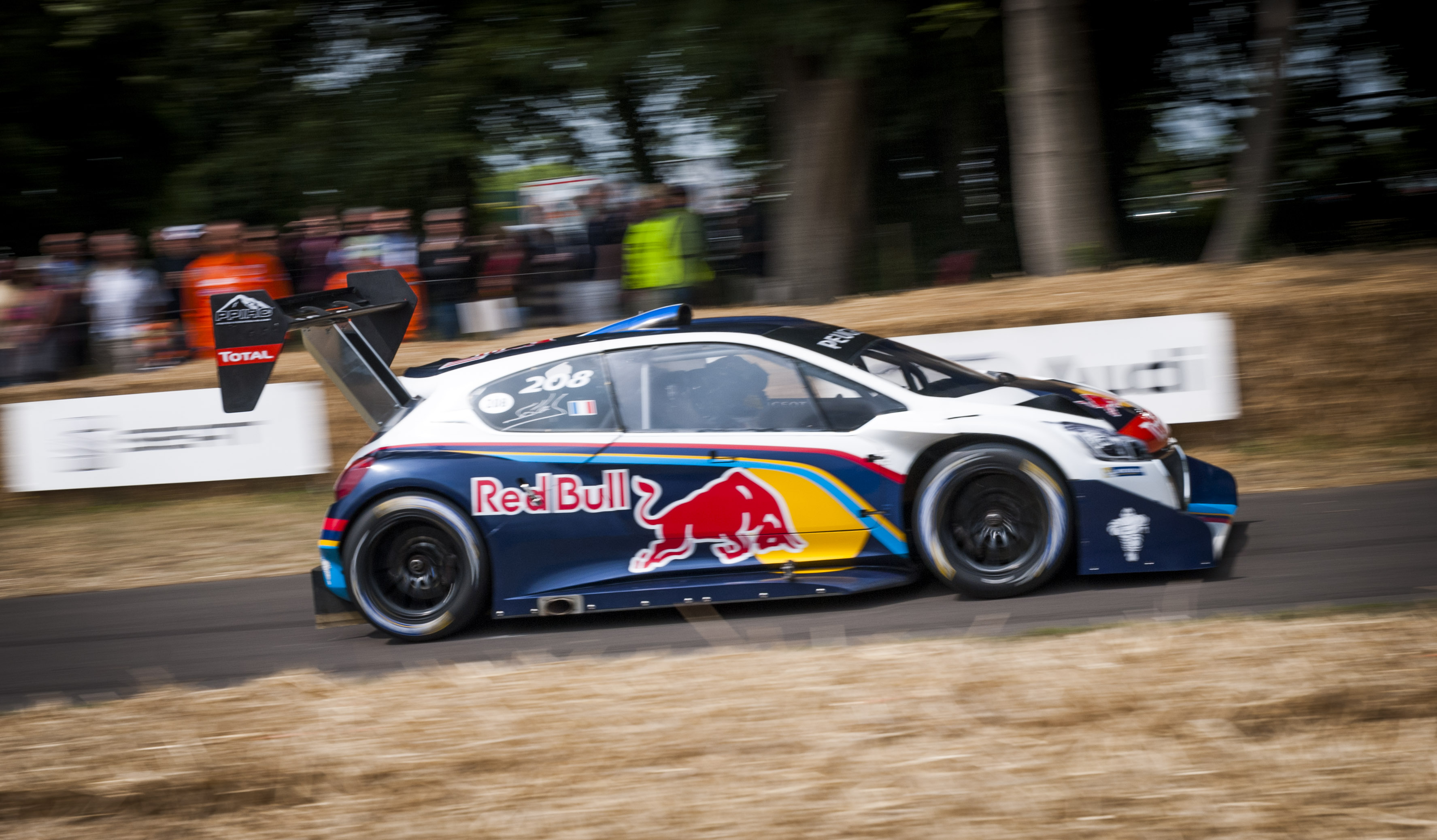
Loeb at the Goodwood Festival of Speed

In April 2013, Loeb tested a Peugeot 208 T16 at Mont Ventoux. Loosely based on the shape and design of the production 208, the T16 is a lightweight 875 kg (1,929 lb) vehicle that uses the rear wing from the Peugeot 908, and has a 3.2-litre, twin-turbo V6 engine, developing 875 bhp (652 kW; 887 PS) with the aim of competing at the Pikes Peak International Hill Climb. Loeb won the event with a time of 8:13.878, smashing the previous record by a minute and a half.

Loeb's record was broken by nearly 15 seconds by Romain Dumas, driving the Volkswagen I.D. R in 2018.

==== Race of Champions ====
===== 2002 =====
Loeb earned the title "Champion of Champions" by beating Marcus Grönholm in the final of the Race of Champions.

===== 2004 =====
Loeb alongside Jean Alesi Won the Nations Cup for France at the 2004 Race of Champions. Heikki Kovalainen defeated Loeb in the Individuals' Final. Loeb was also defeated in a special "World Champions Challenge" by Michael Schumacher.

===== 2005 =====
After being surprised by the young event rookie Heikki Kovalainen last year, Loeb beat Tom Kristensen in the final to claim his second title.

===== 2008 =====
Loeb won the individual 2008 Race of Champions, becoming the second driver after compatriot Auriol to win the event more than twice.

===== 2010 =====
Loeb drove for Team France alongside four-time Formula One World Champion Alain Prost. In the individual event, he made it to the final for the seventh time but lost to surprise winner Filipe Albuquerque.

===== 2022 =====
At the 2022 Race of Champions, Loeb defeated 4 time Formula 1 World Champion Sebastian Vettel 3–1 in the Final to win the event. He equaled fellow French World Rally Champion Didier Auriol's record to win four Races of Champions.

===== 2025 =====
Loeb competed in the 2025 Race of Champions in which he won out against Supercars Championship driver Chaz Mostert 2-0 in the Final to win the event. Loeb also drove for Team France alongside Formula Two driver Victor Martins. The duo won the Nations Cup in the Final against Team Supercars (Australia) consisting of Supercars Championship Champions Brodie Kostecki and Will Brown. Consequently, Loeb is the first driver to win both the Nations Cup and the Race of Champions within the same year.

==== X Games ====
In July 2012, Loeb debuted in the X Games in Los Angeles (X Games XVIII), facing his old rival Marcus Grönholm. Grönholm was hospitalised due to an accident in practice, and Loeb won the rallycross category gold medal well ahead of Ken Block, who was hampered for half the way to the finish line by a puncture.

== Media appearances ==
Loeb provided technical input to the off-road sections of the video game Gran Turismo 5, and in 2016, Milestone released the game Sébastien Loeb Rally Evo. In 2016, Loeb also played as a celebrity contestant in the French game show Fort Boyard.

In 2026, Loeb played himself as the prize announcer in the Chinese film Pegasus 3.

== Personal life ==
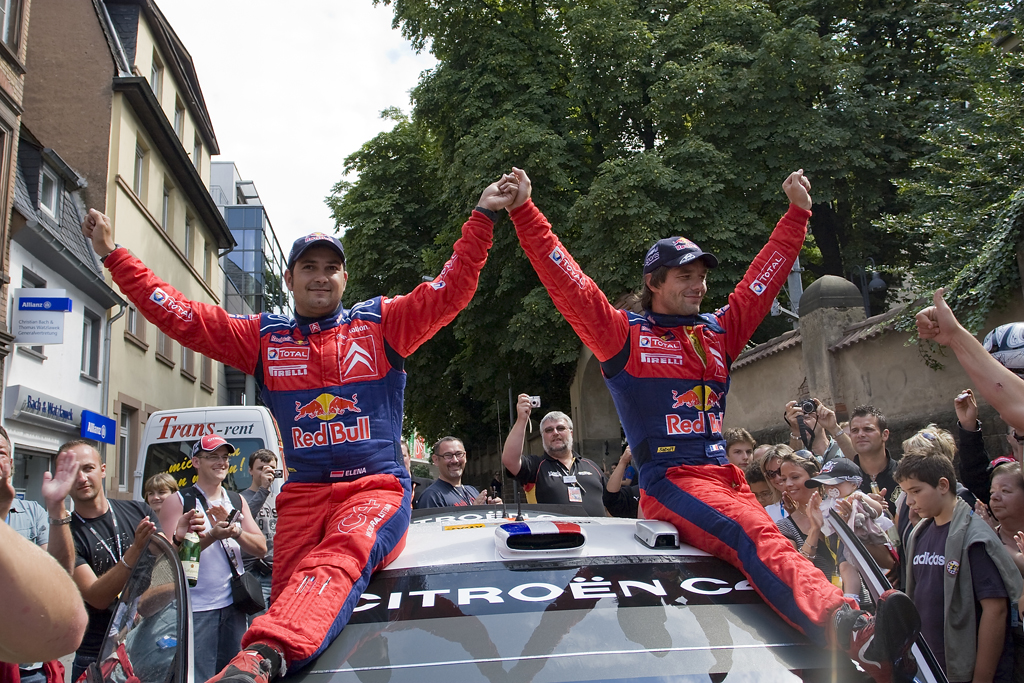
Loeb and co-driver Elena in 2008

Loeb was born in Haguenau, Alsace, France, the only child of Guy and Ingrid Loeb (who died in 2005 and 2012, respectively) and grew up in Oberhoffen-sur-Moder.

Loeb was married to Séverine Meny, who ran the Loeb Events hospitality area during most rallies and also often replaced Daniel Elena as co-driver for non-championship races. The couple also have a daughter. In 2019, Loeb and Meny reportedly separated.

Currently, Loeb's partner is Laurène Godey, who at times co-drives for him. They won the 2019 Rallye du Var. Godey is seen accompanying Loeb at many events.

Loeb resides near Lausanne, Switzerland with Godey and his daughter.

Loeb was made knight of the Légion d'honneur on 27 May 2009, by French president Nicolas Sarkozy. He is a member of the "Champions for Peace" club, a group of 54 elite athletes committed to serving peace in the world through sport, created by Peace and Sport, a Monaco-based international organisation.

== WRC victories ==
World Rally Championship victories (80)
| # | Event | Season | Co-driver | Car |
|---|---|---|---|---|
| 1 | (Germany) 21. ADAC Rallye Deutschland | 2002 | Daniel Elena | Citroën Xsara WRC |
| 2 | (Monaco) 71ème Rallye Automobile Monte-Carlo | 2003 | Daniel Elena | Citroën Xsara WRC |
| 3 | (Germany) 22. ADAC Rallye Deutschland | 2003 | Daniel Elena | Citroën Xsara WRC |
| 4 | (Italy) 45º Rallye Sanremo – Rallye d'Italia | 2003 | Daniel Elena | Citroën Xsara WRC |
| 5 | (Monaco) 72ème Rallye Automobile Monte-Carlo | 2004 | Daniel Elena | Citroën Xsara WRC |
| 6 | (Sweden) 53rd Uddeholm Swedish Rally | 2004 | Daniel Elena | Citroën Xsara WRC |
| 7 | 32nd Cyprus Rally | 2004 | Daniel Elena | Citroën Xsara WRC |
| 8 | 5th Rally of Turkey | 2004 | Daniel Elena | Citroën Xsara WRC |
| 9 | (Germany) 23. OMV ADAC Rallye Deutschland | 2004 | Daniel Elena | Citroën Xsara WRC |
| 10 | 17th Telstra Rally Australia | 2004 | Daniel Elena | Citroën Xsara WRC |
| 11 | (Monaco) 73ème Rallye Automobile Monte-Carlo | 2005 | Daniel Elena | Citroën Xsara WRC |
| 12 | 35th Propecia Rally New Zealand | 2005 | Daniel Elena | Citroën Xsara WRC |
| 13 | (Italy) 2º Supermag Rally Italia Sardinia | 2005 | Daniel Elena | Citroën Xsara WRC |
| 14 | 33rd Cyprus Rally | 2005 | Daniel Elena | Citroën Xsara WRC |
| 15 | 6th Rally of Turkey | 2005 | Daniel Elena | Citroën Xsara WRC |
| 16 | (Greece) 52nd Acropolis Rally | 2005 | Daniel Elena | Citroën Xsara WRC |
| 17 | 25º Rally Argentina | 2005 | Daniel Elena | Citroën Xsara WRC |
| 18 | (Germany) 24. OMV ADAC Rallye Deutschland | 2005 | Daniel Elena | Citroën Xsara WRC |
| 19 | 49ème Tour de Corse – Rallye de France | 2005 | Daniel Elena | Citroën Xsara WRC |
| 20 | (Spain) 41º Rally RACC Catalunya – Costa Daurada | 2005 | Daniel Elena | Citroën Xsara WRC |
| 21 | (Mexico) 20º Corona Rally México | 2006 | Daniel Elena | Citroën Xsara WRC |
| 22 | (Spain) 42º Rally RACC Catalunya – Costa Daurada | 2006 | Daniel Elena | Citroën Xsara WRC |
| 23 | 50ème Tour de Corse – Rallye de France | 2006 | Daniel Elena | Citroën Xsara WRC |
| 24 | 26º Rally Argentina | 2006 | Daniel Elena | Citroën Xsara WRC |
| 25 | (Italy) 3º Rally d'Italia Sardegna | 2006 | Daniel Elena | Citroën Xsara WRC |
| 26 | (Germany) 25. OMV ADAC Rallye Deutschland | 2006 | Daniel Elena | Citroën Xsara WRC |
| 27 | 6th Rally Japan | 2006 | Daniel Elena | Citroën Xsara WRC |
| 28 | 34th Cyprus Rally | 2006 | Daniel Elena | Citroën Xsara WRC |
| 29 | (Monaco) 75ème Rallye Automobile Monte-Carlo | 2007 | Daniel Elena | Citroën C4 WRC |
| 30 | (Mexico) 21º Corona Rally México | 2007 | Daniel Elena | Citroën C4 WRC |
| 31 | 41º Vodafone Rally de Portugal | 2007 | Daniel Elena | Citroën C4 WRC |
| 32 | 27º Rally Argentina | 2007 | Daniel Elena | Citroën C4 WRC |
| 33 | (Germany) 26. ADAC Rallye Deutschland | 2007 | Daniel Elena | Citroën C4 WRC |
| 34 | (Spain) 43º Rally RACC Catalunya – Costa Daurada | 2007 | Daniel Elena | Citroën C4 WRC |
| 35 | 51ème Tour de Corse – Rallye de France | 2007 | Daniel Elena | Citroën C4 WRC |
| 36 | (Republic of Ireland) 3rd Rally Ireland | 2007 | Daniel Elena | Citroën C4 WRC |
| 37 | (Monaco) 76ème Rallye Automobile Monte-Carlo | 2008 | Daniel Elena | Citroën C4 WRC |
| 38 | (Mexico) 22º Corona Rally México | 2008 | Daniel Elena | Citroën C4 WRC |
| 39 | 28º Rally Argentina | 2008 | Daniel Elena | Citroën C4 WRC |
| 40 | (Italy) 5º Rallye d'Italia Sardegna | 2008 | Daniel Elena | Citroën C4 WRC |
| 41 | (Greece) 55th BP Ultimate Acropolis Rally | 2008 | Daniel Elena | Citroën C4 WRC |
| 42 | 58th Neste Oil Rally Finland | 2008 | Daniel Elena | Citroën C4 WRC |
| 43 | (Germany) 27. ADAC Rallye Deutschland | 2008 | Daniel Elena | Citroën C4 WRC |
| 44 | 38th Repco Rally New Zealand | 2008 | Daniel Elena | Citroën C4 WRC |
| 45 | (Spain) 44º Rally RACC Catalunya – Costa Daurada | 2008 | Daniel Elena | Citroën C4 WRC |
| 46 | 52ème Tour de Corse – Rallye de France | 2008 | Daniel Elena | Citroën C4 WRC |
| 47 | (United Kingdom) 64th Wales Rally GB | 2008 | Daniel Elena | Citroën C4 WRC |
| 48 | (Republic of Ireland) 4th Rally Ireland | 2009 | Daniel Elena | Citroën C4 WRC |
| 49 | 23rd Rally Norway | 2009 | Daniel Elena | Citroën C4 WRC |
| 50 | 37th FxPro Cyprus Rally | 2009 | Daniel Elena | Citroën C4 WRC |
| 51 | 43º Vodafone Rally de Portugal | 2009 | Daniel Elena | Citroën C4 WRC |
| 52 | 29º Rally Argentina | 2009 | Daniel Elena | Citroën C4 WRC |
| 53 | (Spain) 45º Rally RACC Catalunya – Costa Daurada | 2009 | Daniel Elena | Citroën C4 WRC |
| 54 | (United Kingdom) 65th Rally of Great Britain | 2009 | Daniel Elena | Citroën C4 WRC |
| 55 | (Mexico) 24º Corona Rally México | 2010 | Daniel Elena | Citroën C4 WRC |
| 56 | 28th Jordan Rally | 2010 | Daniel Elena | Citroën C4 WRC |
| 57 | 10th Rally of Turkey | 2010 | Daniel Elena | Citroën C4 WRC |
| 58 | 41st Rally Bulgaria | 2010 | Daniel Elena | Citroën C4 WRC |
| 59 | (Germany) 28. ADAC Rallye Deutschland | 2010 | Daniel Elena | Citroën C4 WRC |
| 60 | Rallye de France - Alsace 2010 | 2010 | Daniel Elena | Citroën C4 WRC |
| 61 | (Spain) 46º Rally RACC Catalunya – Costa Daurada | 2010 | Daniel Elena | Citroën C4 WRC |
| 62 | (United Kingdom) 66th Wales Rally GB | 2010 | Daniel Elena | Citroën C4 WRC |
| 63 | (Mexico) 25° Rally Guanajuato México | 2011 | Daniel Elena | Citroën DS3 WRC |
| 64 | (Italy) 8° Rally d'Italia Sardegna | 2011 | Daniel Elena | Citroën DS3 WRC |
| 65 | 31º Rally Argentina | 2011 | Daniel Elena | Citroën DS3 WRC |
| 66 | 61st Neste Oil Rally Finland | 2011 | Daniel Elena | Citroën DS3 WRC |
| 67 | (Spain) 47º Rally RACC Catalunya – Costa Daurada | 2011 | Daniel Elena | Citroën DS3 WRC |
| 68 | (Monaco) 80ème Rallye Automobile Monte-Carlo | 2012 | Daniel Elena | Citroën DS3 WRC |
| 69 | (Mexico) 26° Rally Guanajuato México | 2012 | Daniel Elena | Citroën DS3 WRC |
| 70 | 32° Philips Rally Argentina | 2012 | Daniel Elena | Citroën DS3 WRC |
| 71 | (Greece) 58th Acropolis Rally | 2012 | Daniel Elena | Citroën DS3 WRC |
| 72 | 42nd Brother Rally New Zealand | 2012 | Daniel Elena | Citroën DS3 WRC |
| 73 | 62nd Neste Oil Rally Finland | 2012 | Daniel Elena | Citroën DS3 WRC |
| 74 | (Germany) 30. ADAC Rallye Deutschland | 2012 | Daniel Elena | Citroën DS3 WRC |
| 75 | Rallye de France — Alsace 2012 | 2012 | Daniel Elena | Citroën DS3 WRC |
| 76 | (Spain) 48º Rally RACC Catalunya – Costa Daurada | 2012 | Daniel Elena | Citroën DS3 WRC |
| 77 | (Monaco) 81ème Rallye Automobile Monte-Carlo | 2013 | Daniel Elena | Citroën DS3 WRC |
| 78 | 33º Philips LED Rally Argentina | 2013 | Daniel Elena | Citroën DS3 WRC |
| 79 | (Spain) 54º Rally RACC Catalunya – Costa Daurada | 2018 | Daniel Elena | Citroën C3 WRC |
| 80 | (Monaco) 90e Rallye Automobile Monte-Carlo | 2022 | Isabelle Galmiche | Ford Puma Rally1 |

Loeb provisionally won the Monte Carlo event in 2002 but was later docked two minutes for an illegal tyre change and demoted to second place. He also provisionally won the 2009 Rally Australia, but was penalised one minute to second place as his car was fitted with a non-regulation part.

Loeb's win at the 2010 Rallye Deutschland was his eighth victory in a row there, marking a record for consecutive wins in a WRC event. He was the only driver to win the rally from its 2002 introduction to the WRC calendar, until 2011, when he was second and Sébastien Ogier won. Loeb was the first non-Nordic rally driver to win Rally Sweden (in 2004).

== Racing record ==
=== Career summary ===
| Season | Series | Team | Races | Wins | Poles | F/Laps | Podiums | Points | Position |
|---|---|---|---|---|---|---|---|---|---|
| 1999 | World Rally Championship | Equipe de France FFSA | 3 | 0 | N/A | N/A | 0 | 0 | NC |
| 2000 | World Rally Championship | Sébastien Loeb Racing | 2 | 0 | N/A | N/A | 0 | 0 | NC |
| 2000 | World Rally Championship | Équipe de France FFSA | 2 | 0 | N/A | N/A | 0 | 0 | NC |
| 2001 | World Rally Championship | Sébastien Loeb Racing | 7 | 0 | N/A | N/A | 0 | 0 | 14th |
| 2001 | World Rally Championship | Automobiles Citroën | 1 | 0 | N/A | N/A | 1 | 6 | 14th |
| 2001 | Junior World Rally Championship | Sébastien Loeb Racing | 5 | 5 | N/A | N/A | 5 | 50 | **1st** |
| 2002 | World Rally Championship | Automobiles Citroën | 8 | 1 | N/A | N/A | 2 | 18 | 10th |
| 2002 | World Rally Championship | Piedrafita Sport | 1 | 0 | N/A | N/A | 0 | 0 | 10th |
| 2003 | World Rally Championship | Citroën Total | 14 | 3 | N/A | N/A | 7 | 71 | **2nd** |
| 2004 | World Rally Championship | Citroën Total | 16 | 6 | N/A | N/A | 12 | 118 | **1st** |
| 2005 | World Rally Championship | Citroën Total | 16 | 10 | N/A | N/A | 13 | 127 | **1st** |
| 2005 | 24 Hours of Le Mans | Pescarolo Sport | 1 | 0 | 0 | 0 | 0 | N/A | DNF |
| 2006 | World Rally Championship | Kronos Total Citroën WRT | 12 | 8 | N/A | N/A | 12 | 112 | **1st** |
| 2006 | 24 Hours of Le Mans | Pescarolo Sport | 1 | 0 | 0 | 0 | 1 | N/A | **2nd** |
| 2007 | World Rally Championship | Citroën Total WRT | 16 | 8 | N/A | N/A | 13 | 116 | **1st** |
| 2008 | World Rally Championship | Citroën Total WRT | 15 | 11 | N/A | N/A | 13 | 122 | **1st** |
| 2009 | World Rally Championship | Citroën Total WRT | 12 | 7 | N/A | N/A | 9 | 93 | **1st** |
| 2010 | World Rally Championship | Citroën Total WRT | 13 | 8 | N/A | N/A | 12 | 276 | **1st** |
| 2011 | World Rally Championship | Citroën Total WRT | 13 | 5 | N/A | N/A | 9 | 222 | **1st** |
| 2012 | World Rally Championship | Citroën Total WRT | 13 | 9 | N/A | N/A | 10 | 270 | **1st** |
| 2012 | Global RallyCross Championship | Hansen Motorsport | 1 | 1 | N/A | N/A | 1 | 21 | 17th |
| 2013 | FIA GT Series | Sébastien Loeb Racing | 12 | 4 | 4 | 3 | 5 | 82 | 4th |
| 2013 | Porsche Supercup | Porsche | 2 | 0 | 0 | 0 | 0 | 0 | NC |
| 2013 | World Rally Championship | Citroën Total Abu Dhabi WRT | 4 | 2 | N/A | N/A | 3 | 68 | 8th |
| 2013 | FIA European Rallycross Championship | Hervé Lemonnier | 1 | 0 | N/A | N/A | 0 | 11 | 27th |
| 2013 | Porsche Carrera Cup Asia | Team Carrera Cup Asia | 1 | 0 | 0 | 0 | 1 | 0 | NC |
| 2014 | World Touring Car Championship | Citroën WTCC | 23 | 2 | 0 | 2 | 8 | 295 | **3rd** |
| 2014–15 | Andros Trophy – Elite | Saintéloc Racing | 2 | 0 | 0 | 0 | 0 | N/A | N/A |
| 2015 | World Touring Car Championship | Citroën WTCC | 24 | 4 | 1 | 5 | 12 | 365 | **3rd** |
| 2015 | World Rally Championship | Citroën Total Abu Dhabi WRT | 1 | 0 | N/A | N/A | 0 | 6 | 18th |
| 2015 | Porsche Supercup | Sébastien Loeb Racing | 2 | 0 | 0 | 0 | 0 | 0 | NC |
| 2016 | FIA World Rallycross Championship | Team Peugeot-Hansen | 12 | 1 | N/A | N/A | 4 | 209 | 5th |
| 2016 | Dakar Rally | Peugeot | 1 | 0 | N/A | N/A | 0 | N/A | 9th |
| 2017 | FIA World Rallycross Championship | Team Peugeot-Hansen | 12 | 0 | N/A | N/A | 6 | 214 | 4th |
| 2017 | Dakar Rally | Peugeot | 1 | 0 | N/A | N/A | 1 | N/A | **2nd** |
| 2018 | FIA World Rallycross Championship | Team Peugeot Total | 12 | 1 | N/A | N/A | 7 | 229 | 4th |
| 2018 | World Rally Championship | Citroën Total Abu Dhabi WRT | 3 | 1 | N/A | N/A | 1 | 43 | 13th |
| 2018 | Dakar Rally | Peugeot | 1 | 0 | N/A | N/A | 0 | N/A | DNF |
| 2018–19 | Andros Trophy – Elite Pro | Exagon Engineering | 1 | 0 | 1 | 1 | 1 | N/A | N/A |
| 2019 | World Rally Championship | Hyundai Shell Mobis WRT | 6 | 0 | N/A | N/A | 1 | 51 | 11th |
| 2019 | Dakar Rally | Peugeot | 1 | 0 | N/A | N/A | 1 | N/A | **3rd** |
| 2019–20 | Andros Trophy – Elite Pro | Sébastien Loeb Racing | 3 | 0 | 1 | 1 | 2 | 163 | 13th |
| 2020 | World Rally Championship | Hyundai Shell Mobis WRT | 2 | 0 | N/A | N/A | 1 | 24 | 10th |
| 2020–21 | Andros Trophy – Elite Pro | Sébastien Loeb Racing | 3 | 0 | 0 | 1 | 0 | 111 | 15th |
| 2021 | Extreme E | Team X44 | 5 | 1 | N/A | N/A | 2 | 121 | **2nd** |
| 2021 | Dakar Rally | BRX | 1 | 0 | N/A | N/A | 0 | N/A | DNF |
| 2021 | Ultimate Cup Series: GT-Touring Endurance – UGT3 B | Vortex V8 | 1 | 0 | 0 | 0 | 0 | 0 | NC |
| 2021–22 | Andros Trophy – Elite Pro | Sébastien Loeb Racing | 1 | 0 | 0 | 0 | 0 | 52 | 19th |
| 2022 | World Rally Championship | M Sport Ford WRT | 4 | 1 | N/A | N/A | 1 | 35 | 11th |
| 2022 | Extreme E | Team X44 | 5 | 1 | N/A | N/A | 4 | 86 | **1st** |
| 2022 | World Rally-Raid Championship | BRX | 4 | 1 | N/A | N/A | 2 | 164 | **2nd** |
| 2022 | Dakar Rally | BRX | 1 | 0 | N/A | N/A | 1 | 84 | **2nd** |
| 2022 | Deutsche Tourenwagen Masters | AlphaTauri AF Corse | 2 | 0 | 0 | 0 | 0 | 0 | 32nd |
| 2022–23 | Andros Trophy - Elite Pro | Sébastien Loeb Racing | 1 | 0 | 0 | 0 | 0 | 42 | 17th |
| 2023 | World Rally-Raid Championship | BRX | 4 | 0 | N/A | N/A | 1 | 112 | 4th |
| 2023 | Dakar Rally | BRX | 1 | 0 | N/A | N/A | 1 | 87 | **2nd** |
| 2023 | FIA World Rallycross Championship | Special ONE Racing | 3 | 0 | N/A | N/A | 0 | 29 | 9th |
| 2023 | Extreme E | Abt Cupra XE | 4 | 0 | N/A | N/A | 2 | 55 | 10th |
| 2023 | Ultimate Cup Series: Endurance GT Touring Challenge - 3A | Krafft Racing | 1 | 0 | 0 | 1 | 0 | 10 | 6th |
| 2024 | Dakar Rally | BRX | 1 | 0 | N/A | N/A | 1 | N/A | **3rd** |
| 2024 | 24H Series - 992 | Orchid Racing Team | 1 | 0 | 0 | 1 | 1 | 36 | 25th |
| 2024 | Ultimate Cup Series: GT Endurance Cup - UCS1 | Vortex | 1 | 0 | 0 | 0 | 1 | 15 | 10th |
| 2025 | Ultimate Cup European Series: GT Endurance Cup - Porsche Cup | GP Racing Team | | | | | | | |

^{*} Season still in progress.

=== Complete WRC results ===
(key)

| Year | Entrant | Car | 1 | 2 | 3 | 4 | 5 | 6 | 7 | 8 | 9 | 10 | 11 | 12 | 13 | 14 | 15 | 16 | WDC | Points |
|---|---|---|---|---|---|---|---|---|---|---|---|---|---|---|---|---|---|---|---|---|
| 1999 | Equipe de France FFSA | Citroën Saxo Kit Car | MON | SWE | KEN | POR | ESP; Ret | FRA; 19 | ARG | GRE | NZL | FIN | CHN | ITA; 21 | AUS | GBR | | | NC | 0 |
| 2000 | Sébastien Loeb | Citroën Saxo Kit Car | MON | SWE | KEN | POR | ESP | ARG | GRE | NZL | FIN; Ret | CYP | | | | GBR; 38 | | | NC | 0 |
| 2000 | Equipe de France FFSA | Toyota Corolla WRC | | | | | | | | | | | FRA; 9 | ITA; 10 | AUS | | | | NC | 0 |
| 2001 | Sébastien Loeb | Citroën Saxo Kit Car | MON; 15 | SWE; Ret | POR | | | | | | | | | | | | | | 14th | 6 |
| 2001 | Sébastien Loeb | Citroën Saxo VTS S1600 | | | | ESP; 15 | ARG | CYP | GRE; 19 | KEN | FIN; 28 | NZL | | FRA; 13 | AUS | GBR; 15 | | | 14th | 6 |
| 2001 | Automobiles Citroën | Citroën Xsara WRC | | | | | | | | | | | ITA; 2 | | | | | | 14th | 6 |
| 2002 | Automobiles Citroën | Citroën Xsara WRC | MON; 2 | SWE; 17 | FRA | ESP; Ret | CYP | ARG | GRE; 7 | KEN; 5 | FIN; 10 | GER; 1 | ITA | NZL | | GBR; Ret | | | 10th | 18 |
| 2002 | Piedrafita Sport | Citroën Xsara WRC | | | | | | | | | | | | | AUS; 7 | | | | 10th | 18 |
| 2003 | Citroën Total | Citroën Xsara WRC | MON; 1 | SWE; 7 | TUR; Ret | NZL; 4 | ARG; Ret | GRE; Ret | CYP; 3 | GER; 1 | FIN; 5 | AUS; 2 | ITA; 1 | FRA; 13 | ESP; 2 | GBR; 2 | | | **2nd** | **71** |
| 2004 | Citroën Total | Citroën Xsara WRC | MON; 1 | SWE; 1 | MEX; Ret | NZL; 4 | CYP; 1 | GRE; 2 | TUR; 1 | ARG; 2 | FIN; 4 | GER; 1 | JPN; 2 | GBR; 2 | ITA; 2 | FRA; 2 | ESP; Ret | AUS; 1 | **1st** | **118** |
| 2005 | Citroën Total | Citroën Xsara WRC | MON; 1 | SWE; Ret | MEX; 4 | NZL; 1 | ITA; 1 | CYP; 1 | TUR; 1 | GRE; 1 | ARG; 1 | FIN; 2 | GER; 1 | GBR; 3 | JPN; 2 | FRA; 1 | ESP; 1 | AUS; Ret | **1st** | **127** |
| 2006 | Kronos Total Citroën WRT | Citroën Xsara WRC | MON; 2 | SWE; 2 | MEX; 1 | ESP; 1 | FRA; 1 | ARG; 1 | ITA; 1 | GRE; 2 | GER; 1 | FIN; 2 | JPN; 1 | CYP; 1 | TUR | AUS | NZL | GBR | **1st** | **112** |
| 2007 | Citroën Total WRT | Citroën C4 WRC | MON; 1 | SWE; 2 | NOR; 14 | MEX; 1 | POR; 1 | ARG; 1 | ITA; Ret | GRE; 2 | FIN; 3 | GER; 1 | NZL; 2 | ESP; 1 | FRA; 1 | JPN; Ret | IRE; 1 | GBR; 3 | **1st** | **116** |
| 2008 | Citroën Total WRT | Citroën C4 WRC | MON; 1 | SWE; Ret | MEX; 1 | ARG; 1 | JOR; 10 | ITA; 1 | GRE; 1 | TUR; 3 | FIN; 1 | GER; 1 | NZL; 1 | ESP; 1 | FRA; 1 | JPN; 3 | GBR; 1 | | **1st** | **122** |
| 2009 | Citroën Total WRT | Citroën C4 WRC | IRE; 1 | NOR; 1 | CYP; 1 | POR; 1 | ARG; 1 | ITA; 4 | GRE; Ret | POL; 7 | FIN; 2 | AUS; 2 | ESP; 1 | GBR; 1 | | | | | **1st** | **93** |
| 2010 | Citroën Total WRT | Citroën C4 WRC | SWE; 2 | MEX; 1 | JOR; 1 | TUR; 1 | NZL; 3 | POR; 2 | BUL; 1 | FIN; 3 | GER; 1 | JPN; 5 | FRA; 1 | ESP; 1 | GBR; 1 | | | | **1st** | **276** |
| 2011 | Citroën Total WRT | Citroën DS3 WRC | SWE; 6 | MEX; 1 | POR; 2 | JOR; 3 | ITA; 1 | ARG; 1 | GRE; 2 | FIN; 1 | GER; 2 | AUS; 10 | FRA; Ret | ESP; 1 | GBR; Ret | | | | **1st** | **222** |
| 2012 | Citroën Total WRT | Citroën DS3 WRC | MON; 1 | SWE; 6 | MEX; 1 | POR; Ret | ARG; 1 | GRE; 1 | NZL; 1 | FIN; 1 | GER; 1 | GBR; 2 | FRA; 1 | ITA; Ret | ESP; 1 | | | | **1st** | **270** |
| 2013 | Citroën Total Abu Dhabi WRT | Citroën DS3 WRC | MON; 1 | SWE; 2 | MEX | POR | ARG; 1 | GRE | ITA | FIN | GER | AUS | FRA; Ret | ESP | GBR | | | | 8th | 68 |
| 2015 | Citroën Total Abu Dhabi WRT | Citroën DS3 WRC | MON; 8 | SWE | MEX | ARG | POR | ITA | POL | FIN | GER | AUS | FRA | ESP | GBR | | | | 18th | 6 |
| 2018 | Citroën Total Abu Dhabi WRT | Citroën C3 WRC | MON | SWE | MEX; 5 | FRA; 14 | ARG | POR | ITA | FIN | GER | TUR | GBR | ESP; 1 | AUS | | | | 13th | 43 |
| 2019 | Hyundai Shell Mobis WRT | Hyundai i20 Coupe WRC | MON; 4 | SWE; 7 | MEX | FRA; 8 | ARG | CHL; 3 | POR; Ret | ITA | FIN | GER | TUR | GBR | ESP; 4 | AUS; C | | | 11th | 51 |
| 2020 | Hyundai Shell Mobis WRT | Hyundai i20 Coupe WRC | MON; 6 | SWE | MEX | EST | TUR; 3 | ITA | MNZ | | | | | | | | | | 10th | 24 |
| 2022 | M-Sport Ford WRT | Ford Puma Rally1 | MON; 1 | SWE | CRO | POR; Ret | ITA | KEN; 8 | EST | FIN | BEL | GRE; Ret | NZL | ESP | JPN | | | | 11th | 35 |

=== JWRC results ===
(key)

| Year | Entrant | Car | 1 | 2 | 3 | 4 | 5 | 6 | Pos. | Points |
|---|---|---|---|---|---|---|---|---|---|---|
| 2001 | Sébastien Loeb | Citroën Saxo Kit Car | ESP; 1 | GRE; 1 | | | | | **1st** | **50** |
| 2001 | Sébastien Loeb | Citroën Saxo VTS S1600 | | | FIN; 1 | ITA | FRA; 1 | GBR; 1 | **1st** | **50** |

=== WRC summary ===
| Season | Team | Starts | Victories | Podiums | Stage wins | DNF | Points | Final result |
|---|---|---|---|---|---|---|---|---|
| 1999 | Private | 3 | 0 | 0 | 0 | 1 | 0 | NC |
| 2000 | Private | 4 | 0 | 0 | 0 | 1 | 0 | NC |
| 2001 | Private | 7 | 0 | 0 | 0 | 1 | 0 | 14th |
| 2001 | Automobiles Citroën | 1 | 0 | 1 | 4 | 0 | 6 | 14th |
| 2002 | Automobiles Citroën | 8 | 1 | 2 | 19 | 2 | 18 | 14th |
| 2002 | Piedrafita Sport | 1 | 0 | 0 | 0 | 0 | 0 | 14th |
| 2003 | Citroën Total | 14 | 3 | 7 | 38 | 3 | 71 | 2nd |
| 2004 | Citroën Total | 16 | 6 | 12 | 70 | 2 | 118 | 1st |
| 2005 | Citroën Total | 16 | 10 | 13 | 131 | 2 | 127 | 1st |
| 2006 | Kronos Citroën World Rally Team | 12 | 8 | 12 | 87 | 0 | 112 | 1st |
| 2007 | Citroën Total WRT | 16 | 8 | 13 | 102 | 2 | 116 | 1st |
| 2008 | Citroën Total WRT | 15 | 11 | 13 | 118 | 1 | 122 | 1st |
| 2009 | Citroën Total WRT | 12 | 7 | 9 | 88 | 1 | 93 | 1st |
| 2010 | Citroën Total WRT | 13 | 8 | 12 | 96 | 0 | 276 | 1st |
| 2011 | Citroën Total WRT | 13 | 5 | 9 | 65 | 2 | 222 | 1st |
| 2012 | Citroën Total WRT | 13 | 9 | 10 | 72 | 2 | 270 | 1st |
| 2013 | Citroën Total Abu Dhabi WRT | 4 | 2 | 3 | 21 | 1 | 68 | 8th |
| 2015 | Citroën Total Abu Dhabi WRT | 1 | 0 | 0 | 5 | 0 | 6 | 18th |
| 2018 | Citroën Total Abu Dhabi WRT | 3 | 1 | 1 | 9 | 0 | 43 | 13th |
| 2019 | Hyundai Shell Mobis WRT | 6 | 0 | 1 | 9 | 1 | 51 | 11th |
| 2020 | Hyundai Shell Mobis WRT | 2 | 0 | 1 | 1 | 0 | 24 | 10th |
| 2022 | M-Sport Ford WRT | 4 | 1 | 1 | 14 | 2 | 35 | 11th |
| Total | | 184 | 80 | 120 | 939 | 24 | 1778 | |

=== Complete 24 Hours of Le Mans results ===
| Year | Team | Co-Drivers | Car | Class | Laps | Pos. | Class Pos. |
|---|---|---|---|---|---|---|---|
| 2005 | (France) Pescarolo Sport | (France) Soheil Ayari (France) Éric Hélary | Pescarolo C60 Hybrid-Judd | LMP1 | 288 | DNF | DNF |
| 2006 | (France) Pescarolo Sport | (France) Éric Hélary (France) Franck Montagny | Pescarolo C60 Hybrid-Judd | LMP1 | 376 | **2nd** | **2nd** |

=== FIA GT Series results ===
(key) (Races in bold indicate pole position) (Races in italics indicate fastest lap)

| Year | Team | Car | Class | 1 | 2 | 3 | 4 | 5 | 6 | 7 | 8 | 9 | 10 | 11 | 12 | Pos. | Points |
|---|---|---|---|---|---|---|---|---|---|---|---|---|---|---|---|---|---|
| 2013 | Sébastien Loeb Racing | McLaren MP4-12C GT3 | Pro | NOG; QR; 1 | **NOG**; **CR**; 12 | ZOL; QR; 17 | ZOL; CR; 13 | **ZAN**; **QR**; Ret | ZAN; CR; 14 | SVK; QR; 1 | **SVK**; **CR**; Ret | NAV; QR; 1 | **NAV**; **CR**; 1 | BAK; QR; 14 | BAK; CR; 2 | 4th | 82 |

=== Complete Porsche Supercup results ===
(key) (Races in bold indicate pole position) (Races in italics indicate fastest lap)

| Year | Team | 1 | 2 | 3 | 4 | 5 | 6 | 7 | 8 | 9 | 10 | 11 | DC | Points |
|---|---|---|---|---|---|---|---|---|---|---|---|---|---|---|
| 2013 | Porsche AG | ESP; 11 | MON; 16 | GBR | GER | HUN | BEL | ITA | UAE | UAE | | | NC† | 0 |
| 2015 | Sébastien Loeb Racing | ESP | MON | AUT | GBR | HUN | BEL; 13 | BEL; Ret | ITA | ITA | USA | USA | NC† | 0 |

† – As Loeb was a guest driver, he was ineligible to score points.

=== Complete World Touring Car Championship results ===
(key) (Races in bold indicate pole position) (Races in italics indicate fastest lap)

| Year | Team | Car | 1 | 2 | 3 | 4 | 5 | 6 | 7 | 8 | 9 | 10 | 11 | 12 | 13 | 14 | 15 | 16 | 17 | 18 | 19 | 20 | 21 | 22 | 23 | 24 | DC | Points |
|---|---|---|---|---|---|---|---|---|---|---|---|---|---|---|---|---|---|---|---|---|---|---|---|---|---|---|---|---|
| 2014 | Citroën Total WTCC | Citroën C-Elysée WTCC | MAR; 1; 2 | MAR; 2; 1 | FRA; 1; 2 | FRA; 2; 6 | HUN; 1; 7 | HUN; 2; 9 | SVK; 1; 1 | SVK; 2 C | AUT; 1; 4 | AUT; 2; 7 | RUS; 1; 3 | RUS; 2; 5 | BEL; 1; 3 | BEL; 2; 5 | ARG; 1; 4 | ARG; 2; 6 | BEI; 1; 5 | BEI; 2; 3 | CHN; 1; 4 | CHN; 2; 12 | JPN; 1; 3 | JPN; 2; 7 | MAC; 1; 6 | MAC; 2; 6 | **3rd** | **295** |
| 2015 | Citroën Total WTCC | Citroën C-Elysée WTCC | ARG; 1; 3 | ARG; 2; 1 | MAR; 1; 3 | MAR; 2; 2 | HUN; 1; 6 | HUN; 2; 5 | GER; 1; 2 | GER; 2; 5 | RUS; 1; 9 | RUS; 2; 7 | SVK; 1; 3 | SVK; 2; 1 | **FRA**; **1**; 1 | FRA; 2 Ret | POR; 1; 2 | POR; 2; 15† | JPN; 1; 6 | JPN; 2; 4 | CHN; 1; 3 | CHN; 2; 4 | THA; 1; 2 | THA; 2; 1 | QAT; 1; 4 | QAT; 2; 4 | 3rd | 356 |

^{†} Driver did not finish the race, but was classified as he completed over 90% of the race distance.

=== Complete Deutsche Tourenwagen Masters results ===
(key) (Races in bold indicate pole position) (Races in italics indicate fastest lap)

| Year | Entrant | Car | 1 | 2 | 3 | 4 | 5 | 6 | 7 | 8 | 9 | 10 | 11 | 12 | 13 | 14 | 15 | 16 | DC | Points |
|---|---|---|---|---|---|---|---|---|---|---|---|---|---|---|---|---|---|---|---|---|
| 2022 | AlphaTauri AF Corse | Ferrari 488 GT3 Evo 2020 | ALG; 1; 16 | ALG; 2; 18 | LAU; 1 | LAU; 2 | IMO; 1 | IMO; 2 | NOR; 1 | NOR; 2 | NÜR; 1 | NÜR; 2 | SPA; 1 | SPA; 2 | RBR; 1 | RBR; 2 | HOC; 1 | HOC; 2 | 32nd | 0 |

=== Complete Global RallyCross Championship results ===
(key)

==== Supercar ====
| Year | Entrant | Car | 1 | 2 | 3 | 4 | 5 | 6 | GRC | Points |
|---|---|---|---|---|---|---|---|---|---|---|
| 2012 | Hansen Motorsport | Citroën DS3 | CHA | TEX | LA; 1 | NH | LVS | LVC | 17th | 21 |

=== Complete FIA European Rallycross Championship results ===
(key)

==== Supercar ====
| Year | Entrant | Car | 1 | 2 | 3 | 4 | 5 | 6 | 7 | 8 | 9 | ERX | Points |
|---|---|---|---|---|---|---|---|---|---|---|---|---|---|
| 2013 | Hervé Lemonnier | Citroën DS3 | GBR | POR | HUN | FIN | NOR | SWE | FRA; 9 ^{8 + 3} | AUT | GER | 27th | 11 |

=== Complete FIA World Rallycross Championship results ===
(key)

==== Supercar ====
| Year | Entrant | Car | 1 | 2 | 3 | 4 | 5 | 6 | 7 | 8 | 9 | 10 | 11 | 12 | WRX | Points |
|---|---|---|---|---|---|---|---|---|---|---|---|---|---|---|---|---|
| 2016 | Team Peugeot-Hansen | Peugeot 208 WRX | POR; 5 | HOC; 10 | BEL; 2 | GBR; 10 | NOR; 5 | SWE; 2 | CAN; 9 | FRA; 3 | BAR; 8 | LAT; 1 | GER; 8 | ARG; 8 | 5th | 209 |
| 2017 | Team Peugeot-Hansen | Peugeot 208 WRX | BAR; 14 | POR; 2 | HOC; 5 | BEL; 7 | GBR; 4 | NOR; 3 | SWE; 3 | CAN; 3 | FRA; 2 | LAT; 3 | GER; 11 | RSA; 10 | 4th | 214 |
| 2018 | Team Peugeot Total | Peugeot 208 WRX | BAR; 2 | POR; 2 | BEL; 1 | GBR; 3 | NOR; 8 | SWE; 9 | CAN; 3 | FRA; 6 | LAT; 3 | USA; 4 | GER; 8 | RSA; 3 | 4th | 229 |
| 2023 | Special ONE Racing | Lancia Delta Evo-E RX | POR; 6 | NOR; 5 | SWE; 8 | GBR; C | BLX | GER | RSA | RSA | CHN | CHN | | | 9th | 29 |

=== Dakar Rally results ===
| Year | Class | Vehicle | Position | Stages won |
|---|---|---|---|---|
| 2016 | Cars | (France) Peugeot | 9th | 4 |
| 2017 | Cars | (France) Peugeot | **2nd** | 5 |
| 2018 | Cars | (France) Peugeot | DNF | 1 |
| 2019 | Cars | (France) Peugeot | **3rd** | 4 |
| 2021 | Cars | (Bahrain) BRX | DNF | 0 |
| 2022 | Cars | (Bahrain) BRX | **2nd** | 2 |
| 2023 | Cars | (Bahrain) BRX | **2nd** | 7 |
| 2024 | Cars | (Bahrain) BRX | **3rd** | 5 |
| 2025 | Cars | (Romania) Dacia | DNF | 0 |
| 2026 | Cars | (Romania) Dacia | 4th | 0 |

=== Complete Extreme E results ===
(key)

| Year | Team | Car | 1 | 2 | 3 | 4 | 5 | 6 | 7 | 8 | 9 | 10 | Pos. | Points |
|---|---|---|---|---|---|---|---|---|---|---|---|---|---|---|
| 2021 | Team X44 | Spark ODYSSEY 21 | DES; Q 1 | DES; R 3 | OCE; Q 1 | OCE; R 4 | ARC; Q 1 | ARC; R 4 | ISL; Q 1 | ISL; R 5 | JUR; Q 1 | JUR; R 1 | 2nd | 121 |
| 2022 | X44 Vida Carbon Racing | Spark ODYSSEY 21 | DES; 3 | ISL1; 6 | ISL2; 2 | COP; 1 | ENE; 3 | | | | | | 1st | 73 |
| 2023 | Abt Cupra XE | Spark ODYSSEY 21 | DES; 1 | DES; 2 | HYD; 1 | HYD; 2 | ISL1; 1; 4 | ISL1; 2; 6 | ISL2; 1; 2 | ISL2; 2; 3 | COP; 1 | COP; 2 | 10th | 55 |

=== Complete World Rally-Raid Championship results ===
(key)

| Year | Team | Car | Class | 1 | 2 | 3 | 4 | 5 | Pos. | Points |
|---|---|---|---|---|---|---|---|---|---|---|
| 2022 | BRX | BRX Hunter | T1 | DAK; 2 | ABU; 8 | MOR; 22 | AND; 1 | | 2nd | 164 |
| 2023 | BRX | BRX Hunter | T1 | DAK; 2 | ABU; 21 | SON; Ret | DES | MOR; 18 | 4th | 112 |
| 2025 | Dacia Sandriders | Dacia Sandrider | Ultimate | DAK; DSQ | ABU; Ret^{10} | ZAF; 2^{30} | PRT; 3^{31} | MOR; 1^{42} | 4th | 113 |
| 2026 | The Dacia Sandriders | Dacia Sandrider | Ultimate | DAK; 4^{39} | PRT; 1^{18} | DES; 4^{27} | MOR; 65^{7} | ABU | 2nd* | 121* |

^{*}Season still in progress.

Awards and achievements
| Preceded by Petter Solberg | Autosport; International Rally Driver Award; 2004–2006 | Succeeded by Marcus Grönholm |
| Preceded by Marcus Grönholm | Autosport; International Rally Driver Award; 2008 | Succeeded by Mikko Hirvonen |
| Preceded by Mikko Hirvonen | Autosport; International Rally Driver Award; 2010–2012 | Succeeded by Sébastien Ogier |
| Preceded by Laure Manaudou; Alain Bernard | French Sportsperson of the Year (with Daniel Elena); 2007; 2009 | Succeeded by Alain Bernard; Christophe Lemaitre |
Sporting positions
| Preceded by Inaugural | Junior World Rally Champion; 2001 | Succeeded by Daniel Solà |
| Preceded by Marcus Grönholm | Race of Champions; Champion of Champions; 2003 | Succeeded by Heikki Kovalainen |
| Preceded by Petter Solberg | World Rally Champion; 2004, 2005, 2006, 2007, 2008, 2009, 2010, 2011, 2012 | Succeeded by Sébastien Ogier |
| Preceded by Cristiano da Matta; Fonsi Nieto; Gilles Panizzi | Race of Champions; Nations' Cup; 2004; With: Jean Alesi | Succeeded by Mattias Ekström; Tom Kristensen |
| Preceded by Heikki Kovalainen | Race of Champions; Champion of Champions; 2005 | Succeeded by Mattias Ekström |
| Preceded by Mattias Ekström | Race of Champions; Champion of Champions; 2008 | Succeeded by Mattias Ekström |
| Preceded by Benito Guerra Jr. (2019) | Race of Champions; Champion of Champions; 2022 | Succeeded by Mattias Ekström |
| Preceded by Johan Kristoffersson (2021) | Extreme E Champion; 2022 | Succeeded by Johan Kristoffersson (2023) |
Records
| Preceded by Carlos Sainz; 26 wins (1987–2005) | Most rally wins 80 wins, 27th at the 2006 Rally Japan | Succeeded by Incumbent |
| Preceded by Rhys Millen; 9:46.164 (2012) | Pikes Peak Hillclimb; 8:13.878; 2013 | Succeeded by Romain Dumas; 7:57.148 (2018) |
