= WRC Team Mini Portugal =

Team Mini Portugal
- Full name: WRC Team Mini Portugal
- Base: Milan, Italy
- Team principal(s): Mario Stagni
- Drivers: (Portugal) Armindo Araújo (Brazil) Paulo Nobre (Australia) Chris Atkinson
- Co-drivers: (Portugal) Miguel Ramalho (Brazil) Edu Paula (Belgium) Stéphane Prévot
- Chassis: Mini John Cooper Works WRC
- Tyres: Michelin

World Rally Championship history
- Debut: 2012 Rally of Sweden
- Manufacturers' Championships: 0
- Drivers' Championships: 0
- Rally wins: 0

The WRC Team Mini Portugal was Mini's factory-supported World Rally Championship team.

Established in February 2012 after the Prodrive-run Mini WRC Team had its support from parent company BMW reduced, the team debuted at the Rally of Sweden. The WRC Team Mini Portugal was formed out of the merger of the Mini entries of Armindo Araújo World Rally Team and Palmeirinha Rally, which were both run by the Motorsport Italia firm for drivers Armindo Araújo and Paulo Nobre respectively. Team Mini Portugal were registered as a manufacturer entry, while the Prodrive WRC Team was demoted to a works-supported private team. The manufacturers points that had been scored by Armindo Araújo World Rally Team and Palmeirinha Rally at the Monte Carlo Rally prior to the change were removed.

On 16 August 2012 it was announced that Chris Atkinson and Stéphane Prévot would replace Armindo Araújo and Miguel Ramalho as the team's lead crew for the last five races of the 2012 WRC season.

At the end of 2012 Mini withdrew its financial support and the team was closed.

== WRC Results ==
Year	Car	No.	Driver	1	2	3	4	5	6	7	8	9	10	11	12	13	WDC	Points	WCC	Points
2012	Mini John Cooper Works WRC	12	(Portugal) Armindo Araújo	MON	SWE; 15	MEX; 7	POR; 15	ARG; Ret	GRE; 11	NZL; 8	FIN; 15						15th	11	-	-
2012	Mini John Cooper Works WRC	12	(Australia) Chris Atkinson									GER; 5	GBR; 11	FRA; 8	ITA; 6	ESP; 7	13th	28	-	-
2012	Mini John Cooper Works WRC	14	(Brazil) Paulo Nobre	MON	SWE; Ret	MEX; Ret	POR; DNS	ARG; Ret	GRE; 17	NZL; 17	FIN; 38	GER; Ret	GBR; Ret	FRA; Ret	ITA; 19	ESP; 30	-	0	-	-
