= Pierre Campana =

French rally driver (born 1985)

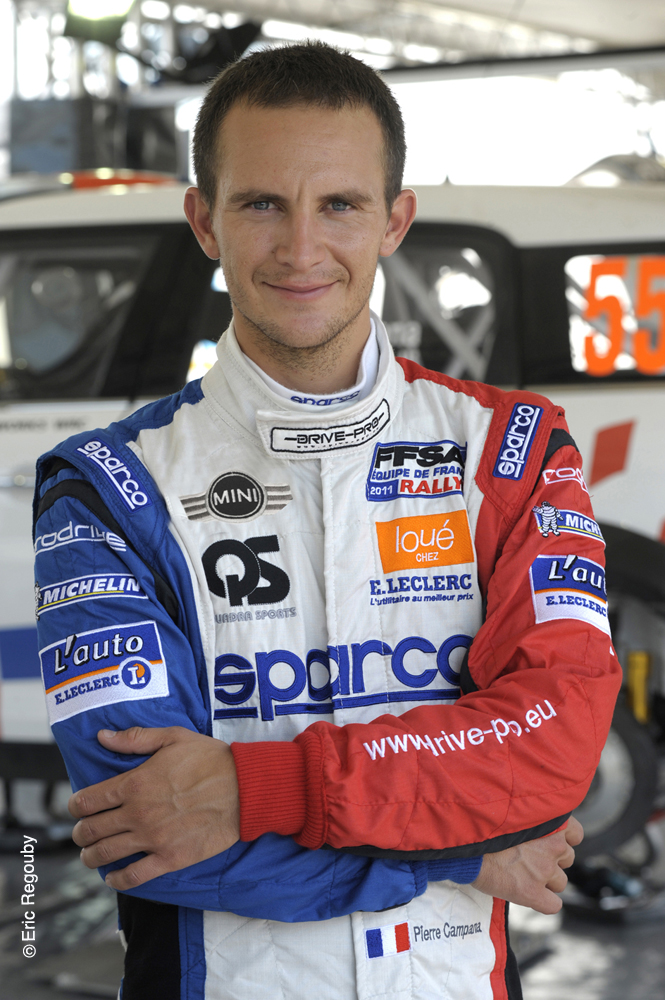
- Campana in 2011

Personal information
- Nationality: (France) French
- Born: 1 May 1985 (age 41)

World Rally Championship record
- Years active: 2007–2008, 2011–2012, 2015
- Co-driver: (France) Antoine Simonpieri (France) Samuel Teissier (France) Sabrina De Castelli (France) Dominique Savignoni
- Rallies: 6
- Championships: 0
- Rally wins: 0
- Podiums: 0
- Stage wins: 0
- Total points: 8
- First rally: 2007 Tour de Corse
- Last rally: 2015 Tour de Corse

Pierre Campana (born 1 May 1985 in Bastia) is a French rally driver from Corsica.

== Career ==
Campana began rallying in 2004, and made his World Rally Championship debut in 2007 on his home event, the Tour de Corse. Driving a Citroën C2 R2, he retired with a mechanical issue. He returned one year later in a Renault Clio R3, as a wildcard entry in the Junior World Rally Championship class. He finished the rally 21st overall and third in JWRC.

In 2010, Campana contested three rounds of the Intercontinental Rally Challenge in his Renault Clio R3. On the Monte Carlo Rally he was 12th overall and second in 2WD. He repeated that same feat on the Ypres Rally. He retired from Czech Rally Zlín after losing a wheel.

Campana returned to Monte Carlo in 2011 and this time won the 2WD category, finishing 14th overall. He then entered his home event the Tour de Corse in a Peugeot 207 S2000, finishing fourth overall. Campana will make his World Rally Car debut on Rallye Deutschland in a Mini John Cooper Works WRC entered by the Fédération Française du Sport Automobile, whose 'Rally Team France' programme Campana will now lead.

=== 2012 ===
In 2012, Campana would race the second chassis for Mini WRC Team.

== WRC results ==
| Year | Entrant | Car | 1 | 2 | 3 | 4 | 5 | 6 | 7 | 8 | 9 | 10 | 11 | 12 | 13 | 14 | 15 | 16 | WDC | Points |
|---|---|---|---|---|---|---|---|---|---|---|---|---|---|---|---|---|---|---|---|---|
| 2007 | Pierre Campana | Citroën C2 R2 | MON | SWE | NOR | MEX | POR | ARG | ITA | GRE | FIN | GER | NZL | ESP | FRA; Ret | JPN | IRE | GBR | NC | 0 |
| 2008 | Pierre Campana | Renault Clio R3 | MON | SWE | MEX | ARG | JOR | ITA | GRE | TUR | FIN | GER | NZL | ESP | FRA; 21 | JPN | GBR | | NC | 0 |
| 2011 | Equipe de France FFSA | Mini John Cooper Works WRC | SWE | MEX | POR | JOR | ITA | ARG | GRE | FIN | GER; 18 | AUS | FRA; 9 | ESP; DNS | GBR | | | | 27th | 2 |
| 2012 | Mini WRC Team | Mini John Cooper Works WRC | MON; 7 | SWE | MEX | POR | ARG | GRE | NZL | FIN | GER | GBR | FRA | ITA | ESP | | | | 21st | 6 |
| 2015 | Pierre Campana | Citroën DS3 R3T Max | MON | SWE | MEX | ARG | POR | ITA | POL | FIN | GER | AUS | FRA; 28 | ESP | GBR | | | | NC | 0 |
