= Jarkko Nikara =

Finnish rally driver (born 1986)

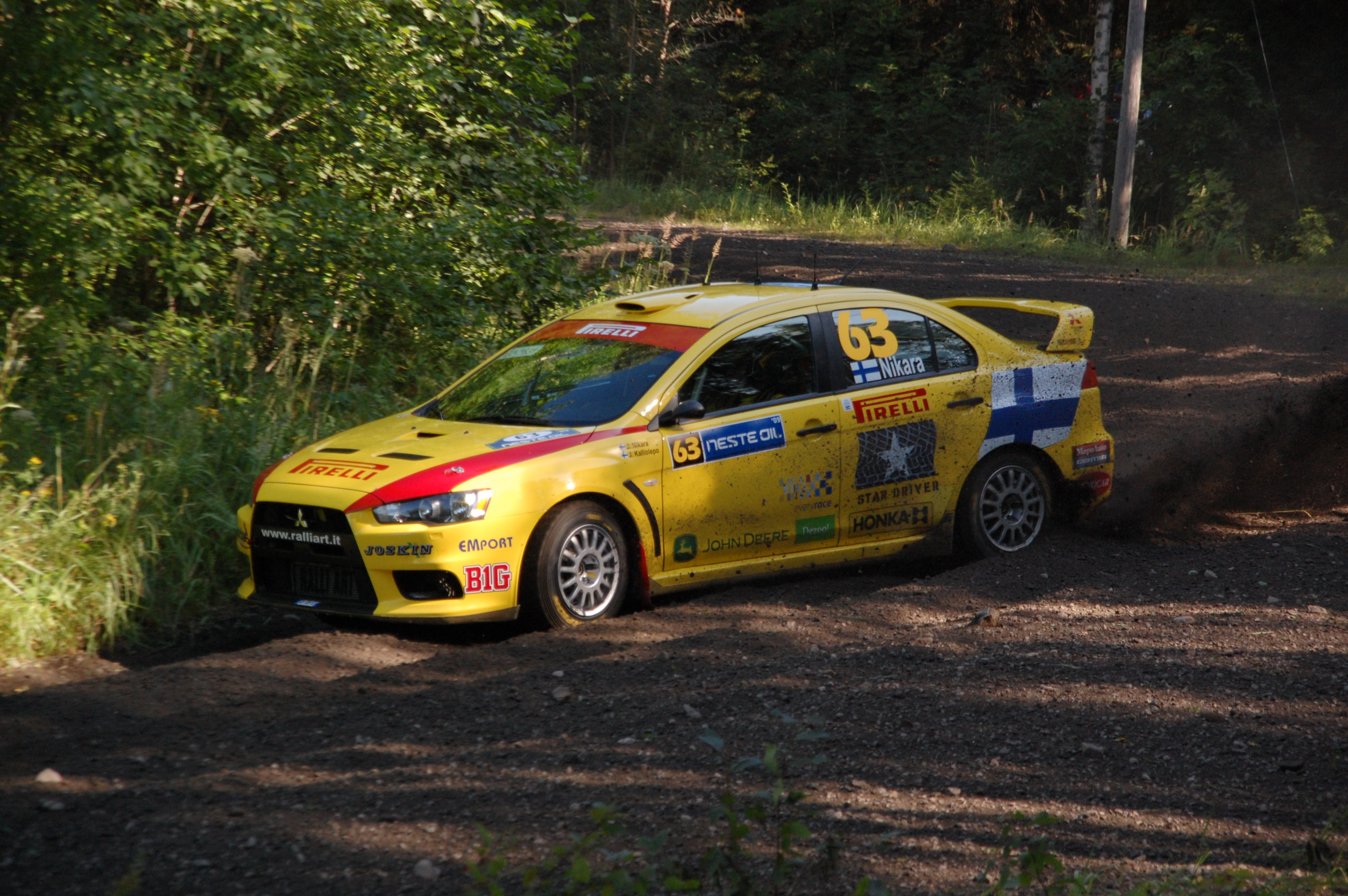
Jarkko Nikara driving one of the Pirelli Star Driver cars in the 2009 Rally Finland.

Jarkko Johannes Nikara (born 28 April 1986) is a Finnish rally driver. He lives in Saarijärvi, Finland.

== Career ==
Nikara started racing at the age of 16 in national autocross competitions. The next year, he participated in Finnish rallysprint races, winning the junior championship. In 2006, he was the Finnish Junior rally champion. The next year, he was second in the national group N championship. In 2009, he participated in six WRC rounds, including his home race, as part of the Pirelli Star Driver competition.

In 2010, Nikara raced in the British Rally Championship, driving a Renault Twingo Sport R2.

== Complete WRC results ==
Year	Entrant	Car	1	2	3	4	5	6	7	8	9	10	11	12	13	14	15	16	WDC	Points
2007	Jarkko Nikara	Honda Civic Type-R	MON	SWE	NOR	MEX	POR	ARG	ITA	GRE	FIN; 38	GER	NZL	ESP	FRA	JPN	IRE	GBR	NC	0
2008	Jarkko Nikara	Ford Fiesta ST	MON	SWE	MEX	ARG	JOR	ITA	GRE	TUR	FIN; Ret	GER	NZL	ESP	FRA	JPN	GBR		NC	0
2009	Pirelli Star Driver	Mitsubishi Lancer Evo X	IRE	NOR	CYP	POR; 41	ARG	ITA; 11	GRE; Ret	POL	FIN; Ret	AUS	ESP; 17	GBR; 35					NC	0
2010	Jarkko Nikara	Peugeot 207 S2000	SWE	MEX	JOR	TUR	NZL	POR	BUL	FIN; 37	GER	JPN	FRA	ESP	GBR				NC	0
2011	Bilbutikken AS WRT	Mitsubishi Lancer Evolution IX	SWE	MEX	POR	JOR	ITA	ARG	GRE	FIN; 21	GER	AUS	FRA	ESP	GBR; Ret				NC	0
2012	Jarkko Nikara	Mitsubishi Lancer Evolution IX	MON	SWE	MEX	POR	ARG	GRE	NZL	FIN; 13	GER	GBR	FRA	ITA					16th	10
2012	Prodrive WRC Team	Mini John Cooper Works WRC													ESP; 5				16th	10
2013	Prodrive WRC Team	Mini John Cooper Works WRC	MON	SWE; 25	MEX	POR	ARG	GRE	ITA	FIN; Ret	GER	AUS	FRA	ESP	GBR				NC	0
2014	Jarkko Nikara	Ford Fiesta RS WRC	MON	SWE	MEX	POR	ARG	ITA	POL	FIN; Ret	GER	AUS	FRA	ESP	GBR				NC	0
2015	Drive Dmack	Ford Fiesta R5	MON	SWE	MEX	ARG	POR	ITA	POL	FIN; Ret	GER	AUS	FRA	ESP	GBR				NC	0
2018	Tommi Mäkinen Racing	Ford Fiesta R5	MON	SWE; 48	MEX	FRA	ARG	POR	ITA	FIN; 48	GER	TUR	GBR	ESP	AUS				NC	0
2025	Toyota Gazoo Racing WRT NG	Renault Clio Rally4	MON	SWE	KEN	ESP	POR	ITA	GRE	EST	FIN; Ret	PAR	CHL	EUR	JPN	SAU			NC	0
2026*	Toyota Gazoo Racing WRT NG	Renault Clio Rally3	MON	SWE	KEN	CRO	ESP	POR; 46	JPN	GRE	EST; 46	FIN	PAR	CHL	ITA	SAU			NC	0

* Season still in progress.

=== JWRC results ===
Year	Entrant	Car	1	2	3	4	5	6	7	JWRC	Points
2007	Jarkko Nikara	Honda Civic Type R	NOR	POR	ITA	FIN; 10	GER	ESP	FRA	NC	0

=== PWRC results ===
Year	Entrant	Car	1	2	3	4	5	6	7	PWRC	Points
2011	Bilbutikken AS WRT	Mitsubishi Lancer Evolution IX	SWE	POR	ARG	FIN; 2	AUS	ESP	GBR; Ret	12th	18
