= Prodrive WRC Team =

World Rally Championship manufacturer team

Prodrive
- Full name: Prodrive WRC Team
- Base: (England) Banbury, United Kingdom
- Team principal(s): David Richards
- Drivers: (United Kingdom) Kris Meeke (Spain) Dani Sordo
- Co-drivers: (Republic of Ireland) Paul Nagle (Spain) Carlos del Barrio
- Chassis: Mini JCW WRC
- Tyres: Michelin

World Rally Championship history
- Debut: 2011 Rally Italia Sardegna
- Last event: 2013 Rally Finland
- Manufacturers' Championships: 0
- Drivers' Championships: 0
- Rally wins: 0

The Prodrive WRC Team, formerly known as the Mini WRC Team was the name given to the World Rally Championship (WRC) team run by Prodrive, a British based motorsport corporation. Prodrive developed the car, the Mini John Cooper Works WRC, in cooperation with MINI.

== Mini in rallying ==
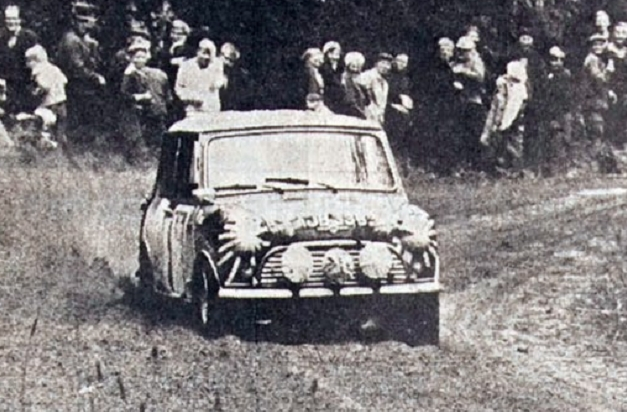
Timo Mäkinen driving to victory in the 1965 1000 Lakes Rally

Mini's history in international rallying dates back to the 1960s, when the Mini Cooper S won the Monte Carlo Rally on three occasions, in 1964, 1965 and 1967, as well as wins on the Acropolis Rally, RAC Rally and 1000 Lakes Rally, and the European Rally Championship in 1965.

Previous Mini rally cars includes the Mini 850, which was first driven to victory by Pat Moss.

== Formation ==
Reports began emerging in mid-2009 that Mini, now owned by BMW, was planning a return to rallying. The reports went even further when Prodrive said that it would not field an entry for the 2011 Formula One season, in order to focus on a return to rallying.

On 27 July 2010, Mini ended months of speculation by confirming its rally programme in cooperation with Prodrive. The team, the factory-supported Mini WRC Team, would compete at six rounds of the 2011 World Rally Championship season, ahead of a full season from 2012 onwards. The team set a target of winning the World Rally Championship in 2013.

== Team ==
=== Mini World Rally Car ===
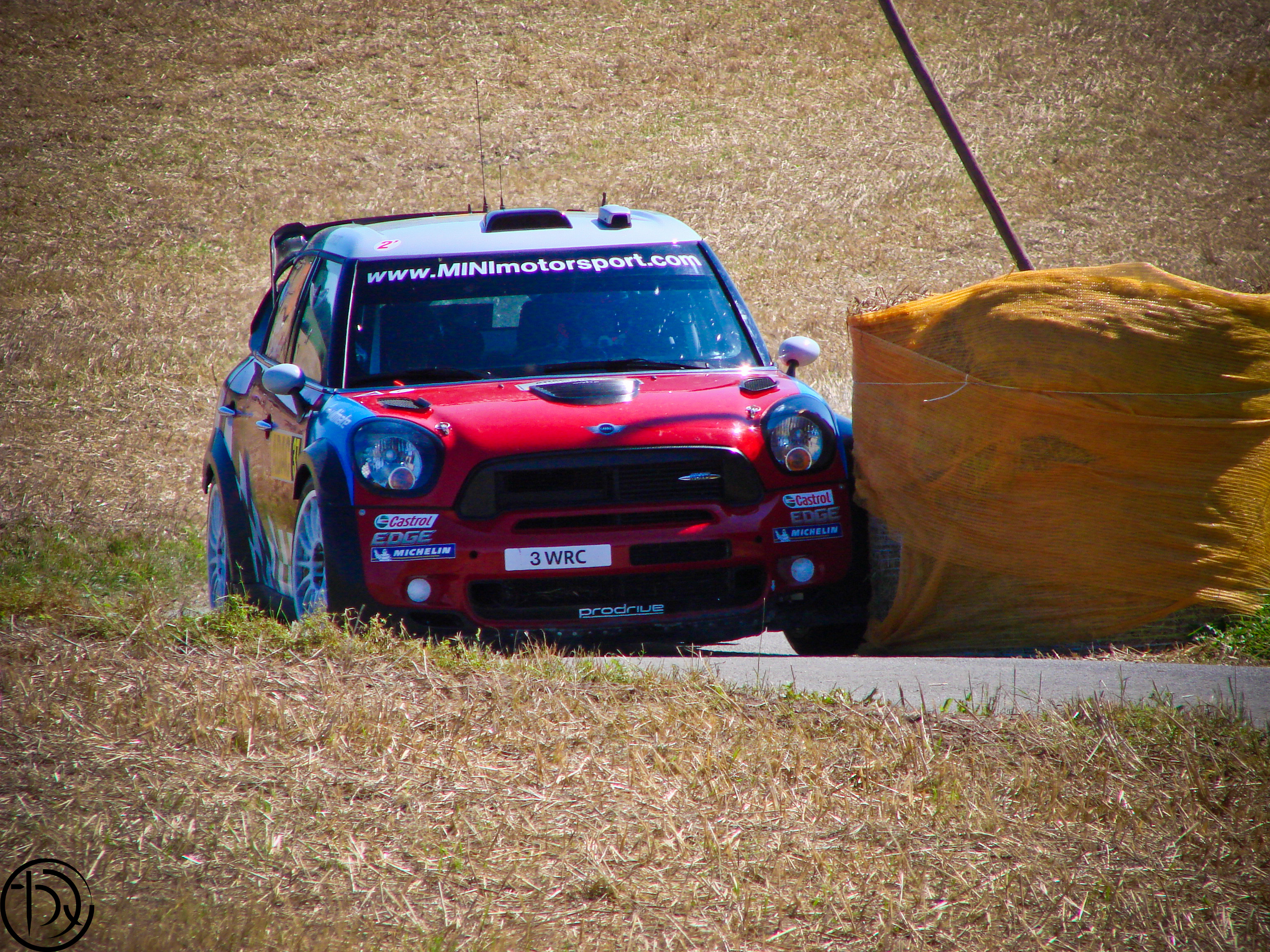
Dani Sordo heading to a third place at the 2011 Rallye Deutschland

Reports had emerged before the rally team was founded that the car was being planned. When the rally team was confirmed BMW confirmed that the car would be used on a limited schedule in the 2011 World Rally Championship. Prodrive confirmed that work on the Mini WRC started in late 2010.

=== Operations ===
The team was based at Prodrive's facilities in Banbury, previously the base of the Subaru World Rally Team. The team principal was David Richards, along with co-principal Glen Coates.

== History ==
=== 2011 ===
The team signed Kris Meeke, a former IRC rally champion, as one of its rally drivers. In January 2011 the second driver was announced and Dani Sordo signed up for the season. The team competed at six rounds with both drivers, achieving two podiums in Germany and France with Sordo.

=== 2012 ===
Almost since the team launch in 2011, there was unease between BMW and Prodrive concerning the financing of the programme, to the extent that Mini WRC Team had to shelve plans to run two official drivers in 2012. Dani Sordo was confirmed, while Kris Meeke was replaced by Pierre Campana. At the 2012 Monte Carlo Rally Sordo managed a second place overall.

In February, after only one race, BMW terminated its contract with Prodrive. The team had to change its name in Prodrive WRC Team. A new works-team was formed as WRC Team Mini Portugal from the merger of the Mini entries of Armindo Araújo World Rally Team and Palmeirinha Rally, which were both run by the Motorsport Italia firm. Team Mini Portugal was registered as a manufacturer entry, while the new Prodrive WRC Team was demoted to a works-supported private entry. The team reduced its programme to seven rounds with Sordo, while the second car was entered in some events by different drivers.

== WRC results ==
Year	Car	No	Driver	1	2	3	4	5	6	7	8	9	10	11	12	13	WDC	Points	WMC	Points
2011	Mini John Cooper Works WRC	37	(Spain) Dani Sordo	SWE	MEX	POR	JOR	ITA; 6	ARG	GRE	FIN; Ret	GER; 3	AUS	FRA; 2	ESP; 4	GBR; 20	8th	59	-*	-*
2011	Mini John Cooper Works WRC	52	(United Kingdom) Kris Meeke	SWE	MEX	POR	JOR	ITA; Ret	ARG	GRE	FIN; Ret	GER; Ret	AUS	FRA; Ret	ESP; 5	GBR; 4	11th	25	-*	-*
2012	Mini John Cooper Works WRC	23	(Finland) Jarkko Nikara	MON	SWE	MEX	POR	ARG	GRE	NZL	FIN	GER	GBR	FRA	ITA	ESP; 5	16th	10	-	NC
2012	Mini John Cooper Works WRC	37	(Spain) Dani Sordo	MON; 2	SWE; Ret	MEX	POR; 11	ARG	GRE	NZL; 6	FIN	GER; 9	GBR	FRA; Ret	ITA	ESP; 9	11th	35	-	NC
2012	Mini John Cooper Works WRC	52	(France) Pierre Campana	MON; 7													21st	6	-	NC
2012	Mini John Cooper Works WRC	52	(Sweden) Patrik Sandell		SWE; 8	MEX	POR; Ret	ARG	GRE	NZL	FIN	GER	GBR	FRA	ITA	ESP	27th	4	-	NC
2013	Mini John Cooper Works WRC	23	(Finland) Jarkko Nikara	MON	SWE; 25	MEX	POR	ARG	GRE	ITA	FIN; Ret	GER	AUS	FRA	ESP	GBR	-	0	-	-

- Mini entered in 2011 season as development entry, therefore they could not score points as a team.

== See also ==
- Citroën World Rally Team
- Ford World Rally Team
- Subaru World Rally Team
