= 2012 World Rally Championship =

40th season of the FIA World Rally Championship

Champions
- World Drivers' Champion: Sébastien Loeb; World Co-drivers' Champion: Daniel Elena
- World Manufacturers' Champion: Citroën

Seasons
- ← 2011 2013 →

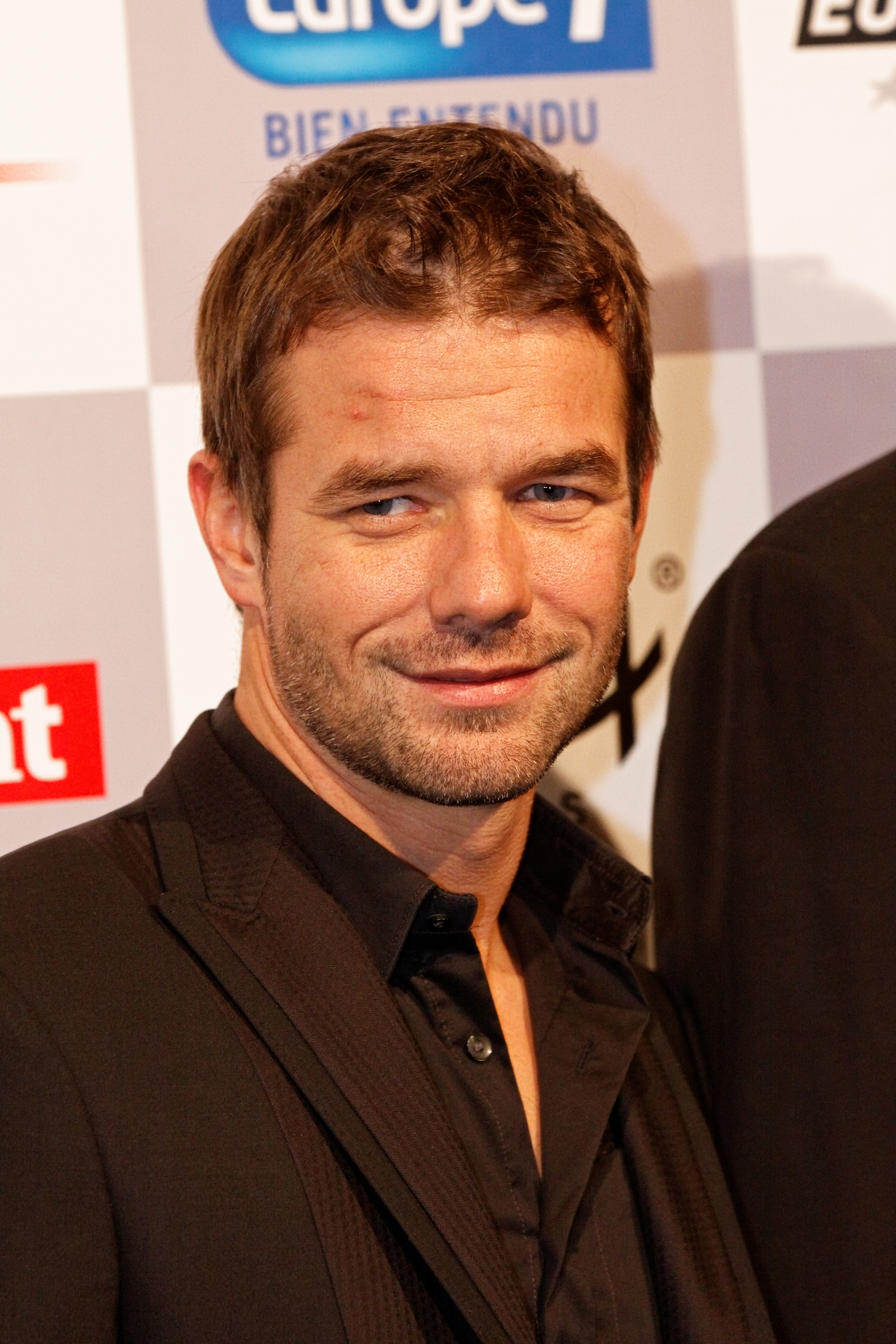
Sébastien Loeb won his ninth Drivers' Championship title.

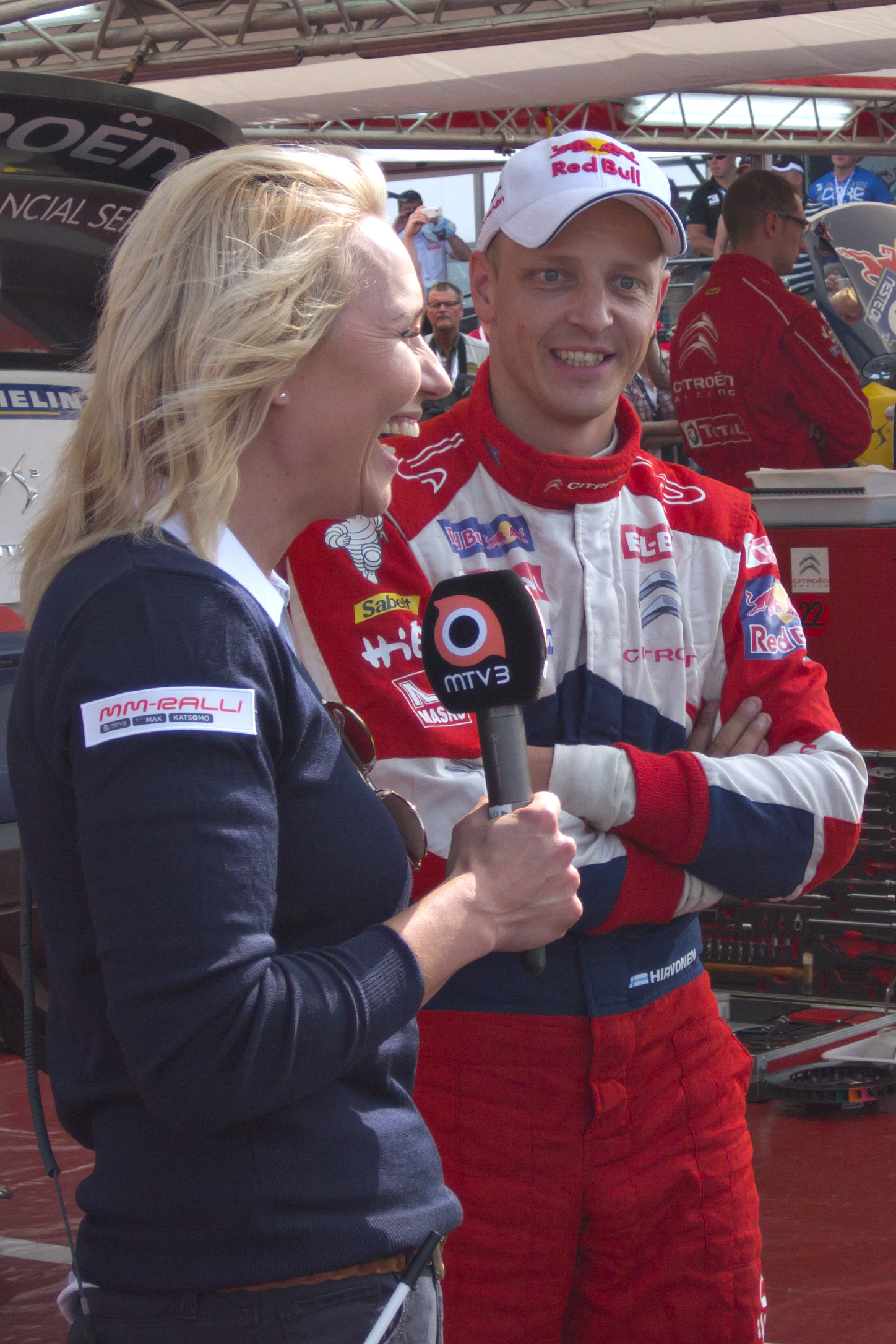
Mikko Hirvonen, who finished second, interviewed during the Rally Finland

The 2012 World Rally Championship was the 40th season of the FIA World Rally Championship. The season consisted of thirteen rallies, beginning with Monte Carlo Rally on 17 January, and ending on 11 November with Rally Catalunya.

Sébastien Loeb won the drivers' championship for the ninth time in his career, ahead of Finns Mikko Hirvonen and Jari-Matti Latvala. Citroën won the manufacturers' championship.

== Calendar ==
The 2012 championship was contested over thirteen rounds in Europe, North America, South America and Oceania.

The 2012 calendar was announced at a meeting of the FIA World Motor Sport Council in Singapore on 26 September 2011.

Round	Rally Name (Base)	Surface	Dates	Support Categories
1	Monte Carlo Rally (Monte Carlo, Monaco)	Mixed (Tarmac, snow)	18–22 January	Super 2000 WRC; Production WRC
2	Rally Sweden (Karlstad, Värmland)	Snow	9–12 February	Super 2000 WRC
3	Rally Mexico (León, Guanajuato)	Gravel	8–11 March	Production WRC
4	Rally de Portugal (Faro, Algarve)	Gravel	29 March – 1 April	Super 2000 WRC; WRC Academy
5	Rally Argentina (Villa Carlos Paz, Córdoba)	Gravel	26–29 April	Production WRC
6	(Greece) Acropolis Rally (Loutraki, Corinthia)	Gravel	24–27 May	Production WRC; WRC Academy
7	Rally New Zealand (Auckland, Te Ika-a-Māui)	Gravel	22–24 June	Super 2000 WRC; Production WRC
8	Rally Finland (Jyväskylä, Keski-Suomi)	Gravel	2–4 August	Super 2000 WRC; WRC Academy
9	(Germany) Rallye Deutschland (Trier, Rhineland-Palatinate)	Tarmac	24–26 August	Production WRC; WRC Academy
10	(United Kingdom) Wales Rally GB (Cardiff, South Glamorgan)	Gravel	14–16 September	Super 2000 WRC
11	Rallye de France Alsace (Strasbourg, Alsace)	Tarmac	4–7 October	Super 2000 WRC; WRC Academy
12	(Italy) Rally Italia Sardegna (Olbia, Sardinia)	Gravel	18–21 October	Production WRC
13	(Spain) Rally Catalunya (Salou, Tarragona)	Mixed (Tarmac, gravel)	8–11 November	Super 2000 WRC; Production WRC; WRC Academy

=== Calendar changes ===
- Early plans to run the Rally Argentina over an "endurance" format with stages in neighbouring Uruguay and Chile were abandoned in favour of a new route which featured over 500 km (311 mi) of competitive stages and made it the longest rally in the modern era of the sport. The rally also featured the longest stage of the championship, the 66 km (41 mi) El Durzano–Ambul stage. The extended rally route has been promoted as a prototype of a format proposed by FIA President Jean Todt.
- The Jordan Rally was removed from the calendar. Rally Abu Dhabi was expected to be promoted in its place, but was omitted from the final calendar and given candidate status for future inclusion in the championship.
- The Wales Rally GB was brought forward from its traditional November date to September, making Rally of Spain the season finale.
- The route of the Rally Finland was revised from the 2011 event, and included the return of several famous stages, including Ouninpohja, Mokkipera and Palsankyla.
- The Rally Italia Sardegna was moved back from May to October.
- The Rallye Automobile Monte Carlo returned to the calendar after a three-year absence.
- The Rally New Zealand replaced Rally Australia, in keeping with their event-sharing arrangement.

== Teams and drivers ==
=== World Rally Championship entries ===
Manufacturer teams
Manufacturer	Car	Team	Tyre	No	Driver	Co-driver	Rounds
Citroën	DS3 WRC	(France) Citroën Total World Rally Team	M	1	(France) Sébastien Loeb	(Monaco) Daniel Elena	All
Citroën	DS3 WRC	(France) Citroën Total World Rally Team	M	2	(Finland) Mikko Hirvonen	(Finland) Jarmo Lehtinen	All
Citroën	DS3 WRC	Qatar World Rally Team	M	7	(Qatar) Nasser Al-Attiyah	(Italy) Giovanni Bernacchini	2–6, 9–11
Citroën	DS3 WRC	Qatar World Rally Team	M	7	(Belgium) Thierry Neuville	(Belgium) Nicolas Gilsoul	7, 12
Citroën	DS3 WRC	Qatar World Rally Team	M	7	(Australia) Chris Atkinson	(Belgium) Stéphane Prévot	8
Citroën	DS3 WRC	Qatar World Rally Team	M	7	(Netherlands) Hans Weijs Jr.	(Belgium) Björn Degandt	13
Citroën	DS3 WRC	(France) Citroën Junior World Rally Team	M	8	(Belgium) Thierry Neuville	(Belgium) Nicolas Gilsoul	1–6, 8–11, 13
Ford	Fiesta RS WRC	(United Kingdom) Ford World Rally Team	M	3	(Finland) Jari-Matti Latvala	(Finland) Miikka Anttila	1–4, 6–13
Ford	Fiesta RS WRC	(United Kingdom) Ford World Rally Team	M	3	(Spain) Dani Sordo	(Spain) Carlos del Barrio	5
Ford	Fiesta RS WRC	(United Kingdom) Ford World Rally Team	M	4	(Norway) Petter Solberg	(United Kingdom) Chris Patterson	All
Ford	Fiesta RS WRC	(United Kingdom) M-Sport Ford World Rally Team	M	5	(Estonia) Ott Tänak	(Estonia) Kuldar Sikk	All
Ford	Fiesta RS WRC	(United Kingdom) M-Sport Ford World Rally Team	M	6	(Russia) Evgenij Novikov	(France) Denis Giraudet	1–8
Ford	Fiesta RS WRC	(United Kingdom) M-Sport Ford World Rally Team	M	6	(Russia) Evgenij Novikov	(France) Nicolas Klinger	9
Ford	Fiesta RS WRC	(United Kingdom) M-Sport Ford World Rally Team	M	6	(Russia) Evgenij Novikov	(Austria) Ilka Minor	10–12
Ford	Fiesta RS WRC	(United Kingdom) M-Sport Ford World Rally Team	M	6	(Trinidad and Tobago) John Powell	(Jamaica) Michael Fennell	13
Ford	Fiesta RS WRC	(United Kingdom) M-Sport Ford World Rally Team	M	8	(France) François Delecour	(France) Dominique Savignoni	1
Ford	Fiesta RS WRC	(United Kingdom) M-Sport Ford World Rally Team	M	8	(Poland) Michał Sołowow	(Poland) Maciek Baran	2
Ford	Fiesta RS WRC	(United Kingdom) M-Sport Ford World Rally Team	M	15	(United Kingdom) Matthew Wilson	(United Kingdom) Scott Martin	10
Ford	Fiesta RS WRC	(United Kingdom) M-Sport Ford World Rally Team	M	16	(South Africa) Jannie Habig	(United Kingdom) Robbie Durant	10
Ford	Fiesta RS WRC	(United Kingdom) M-Sport Ford World Rally Team	M	18	(Netherlands) Dennis Kuipers	(Belgium) Robin Buysmans	4
Ford	Fiesta RS WRC	Brazil World Rally Team	M	9	(Brazil) Daniel Oliveira	(Portugal) Carlos Magalhães	4–6, 9, 11, 13
Ford	Fiesta RS WRC	Brazil World Rally Team	M	9	(Austria) Manfred Stohl	(Austria) Ilka Minor	7
Ford	Fiesta RS WRC	(Norway) Adapta World Rally Team	M	10	(Norway) Mads Østberg	(Sweden) Jonas Andersson	2–3, 5, 8–11, 13
Ford	Fiesta RS WRC	(Norway) Adapta World Rally Team	M	64	(Norway) Eyvind Brynildsen	(Norway) Cato Menkerud	2
Mini	John Cooper Works WRC	(Portugal) Armindo Araújo World Rally Team	M	12	(Portugal) Armindo Araújo	(Portugal) Miguel Ramalho	1
Mini	John Cooper Works WRC	WRC Team Mini Portugal ^{2}	M	12	(Portugal) Armindo Araújo	(Portugal) Miguel Ramalho	2–8
Mini	John Cooper Works WRC	WRC Team Mini Portugal ^{2}	M	12	(Australia) Chris Atkinson	(Belgium) Stéphane Prévot	9–10, 12
Mini	John Cooper Works WRC	WRC Team Mini Portugal ^{2}	M	12	(Australia) Chris Atkinson	(Australia) Glenn MacNeall	11, 13
Mini	John Cooper Works WRC	WRC Team Mini Portugal ^{2}	M	14	(Brazil) Paulo Nobre	(Brazil) Edu Paula	2–13
Mini	John Cooper Works WRC	(Brazil) Palmeirinha Rally	M	14	(Brazil) Paulo Nobre	(Brazil) Edu Paula	1
Mini	John Cooper Works WRC	(United Kingdom) Mini WRC Team ^{1}	M	37	(Spain) Dani Sordo	(Spain) Carlos del Barrio	1
Mini	John Cooper Works WRC	(United Kingdom) Mini WRC Team ^{1}	M	52	(France) Pierre Campana	(France) Sabrina de Castelli	1

World Rally Car entries ineligible to score manufacturer points
Manufacturer	Car	Team	Tyre	Drivers	Co-drivers	Rounds
Citroën	DS3 WRC	(Netherlands) Van Merksteijn Motorsport	M	(Netherlands) Peter van Merksteijn Sr.	(Belgium) Eddy Chevaillier	1
Citroën	DS3 WRC	(Netherlands) Van Merksteijn Motorsport	M	(Netherlands) Peter van Merksteijn Jr.	(Belgium) Eddy Chevaillier	2, 4, 9
Citroën	DS3 WRC	Collectif Equipe de France Rallye	M	(France) Sébastien Chardonnet	(France) Thibault de la Haye	11
Citroën	DS3 WRC	(France) PH Sport	M	(Italy) Luca Pedersoli	(Italy) Matteo Romano	12
Ford	Fiesta RS WRC	(Czech Republic) Czech Ford National Team	M	(Czech Republic) Martin Prokop	(Czech Republic) Zdeněk Hrůza	1–2, 4, 6, 8–11
Ford	Fiesta RS WRC	(Czech Republic) Czech Ford National Team	D	(Czech Republic) Martin Prokop	(Czech Republic) Zdeněk Hrůza	12
Ford	Fiesta RS WRC	(United States) Go Fast Energy World Rally Team	M	(United Kingdom) Matthew Wilson	(United Kingdom) Scott Martin	1
Ford	Fiesta RS WRC	(United States) Go Fast Energy World Rally Team	M	(Norway) Henning Solberg	(Austria) Ilka Minor	1–4, 6, 8
Ford	Fiesta RS WRC	(France) Team Emap Yacco	M	(France) Julien Maurin	(France) Olivier Ural	1
Ford	Fiesta RS WRC	(France) Team Emap Yacco	M	(France) Julien Maurin	(France) Nicolas Klinger	11
Ford	Fiesta RS WRC	(United Kingdom) Autotek Motorsport	D	(Finland) Jari Ketomaa	(Finland) Mika Stenberg	2, 4, 7–8
Ford	Fiesta RS WRC	(United Kingdom) Autotek Motorsport	D	(Czech Republic) Martin Prokop	(Czech Republic) Zdeněk Hrůza	5
Ford	Fiesta RS WRC	(United Kingdom) Autotek Motorsport	D	(Czech Republic) Martin Prokop	(Czech Republic) Michal Ernst	13
Ford	Fiesta RS WRC	(United Kingdom) Autotek Motorsport	D	(Russia) Evgenij Novikov	(Austria) Ilka Minor	13
Ford	Fiesta RS WRC	(United Kingdom) Autotek Motorsport	M	(Cyprus) Spyros Pavlides	(France) Nicolas Klinger	6
Ford	Fiesta RS WRC	(United States) Monster World Rally Team	M	(United States) Ken Block	(Italy) Alex Gelsomino	3, 7–8
Ford	Fiesta RS WRC	(United States) Monster World Rally Team	M	(Australia) Chris Atkinson	(Belgium) Stéphane Prévot	3
Ford	Fiesta RS WRC	(United Kingdom) M-Sport	D	(Mexico) Ricardo Triviño	(Spain) Àlex Haro	3
Ford	Fiesta RS WRC	(United Kingdom) M-Sport	M	(Finland) Matti Rantanen	(Finland) Mikko Lukka	8
Ford	Fiesta RS WRC	(Ukraine) AT Rally Team	M	(Ukraine) Oleksiy Tamrazov	(Ukraine) Oleksandr Gorbyk	6
Ford	Fiesta RS WRC	(Ukraine) AT Rally Team	M	(Finland) Sebastian Lindholm	(Finland) Timo Hantunen	8
Mini	John Cooper Works WRC	(United Kingdom) Mini WRC Team (United Kingdom) Prodrive WRC Team	M	(Spain) Dani Sordo	(Spain) Carlos del Barrio	2, 4, 7, 9, 11, 13
Mini	John Cooper Works WRC	(United Kingdom) Mini WRC Team (United Kingdom) Prodrive WRC Team	M	(Sweden) Patrik Sandell	(Sweden) Staffan Parmander	2
Mini	John Cooper Works WRC	(United Kingdom) Mini WRC Team (United Kingdom) Prodrive WRC Team	M	(Sweden) Patrik Sandell	(Sweden) Maria Andersson	4
Mini	John Cooper Works WRC	(United Kingdom) Mini WRC Team (United Kingdom) Prodrive WRC Team	M	(France) Yvan Muller	(France) Guy Leveneu	11
Mini	John Cooper Works WRC	(United Kingdom) Mini WRC Team (United Kingdom) Prodrive WRC Team	M	(Finland) Jarkko Nikara	(Finland) Jarkko Kalliolepo	13
Mini	John Cooper Works WRC	(United Kingdom) Prodrive	M	(Sweden) Richard Göransson	(Sweden) Anders Fredriksson	2
Mini	John Cooper Works WRC	(United Kingdom) Prodrive	M	(Chile) Eliseo Salazar	(Spain) Marc Martí	5
Mini	John Cooper Works WRC	Seashore Qatar Rally Team	M	(Qatar) Abdulaziz Al-Kuwari	(Italy) Nicola Arena	6
Mini	John Cooper Works WRC	Seashore Qatar Rally Team	M	(Qatar) Abdulaziz Al-Kuwari	(Republic of Ireland) Killian Duffy	13
Mini	John Cooper Works WRC	(Turkey) Toksport	M	(Finland) Riku Tahko	(Finland) Markus Soininen	8
Mini	John Cooper Works WRC	(France) Dumas Rallye Team	M	(France) Romain Dumas	(France) Matthieu Baumel	11

Notes:

- ^1 – The Mini WRC Team lost Mini's support as a manufacturer team after the Monte Carlo Rally, making them ineligible to score points in the World Rally Championship for Manufacturers. The Mini WRC Team became known as the Prodrive WRC Team from the Rally de Portugal.
- ^2 – The Armindo Araújo World Rally Team and Palmeirinha Rally were merged to form WRC Team Mini Portugal with the support of Mini for the Rally of Sweden; however, the FIA ruled that they were not eligible to score points in the FIA World Rally Championship for Manufacturers.

==== Team and driver changes ====
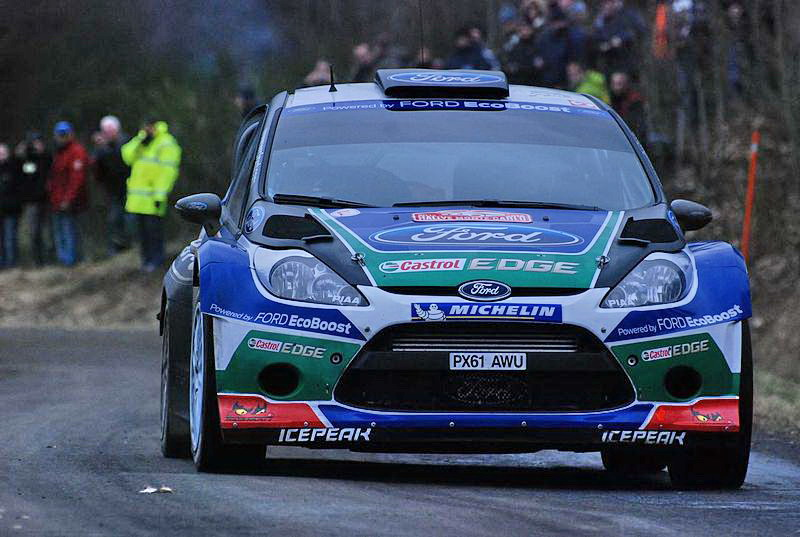
After 12 years, Petter Solberg returned to the Ford factory team.

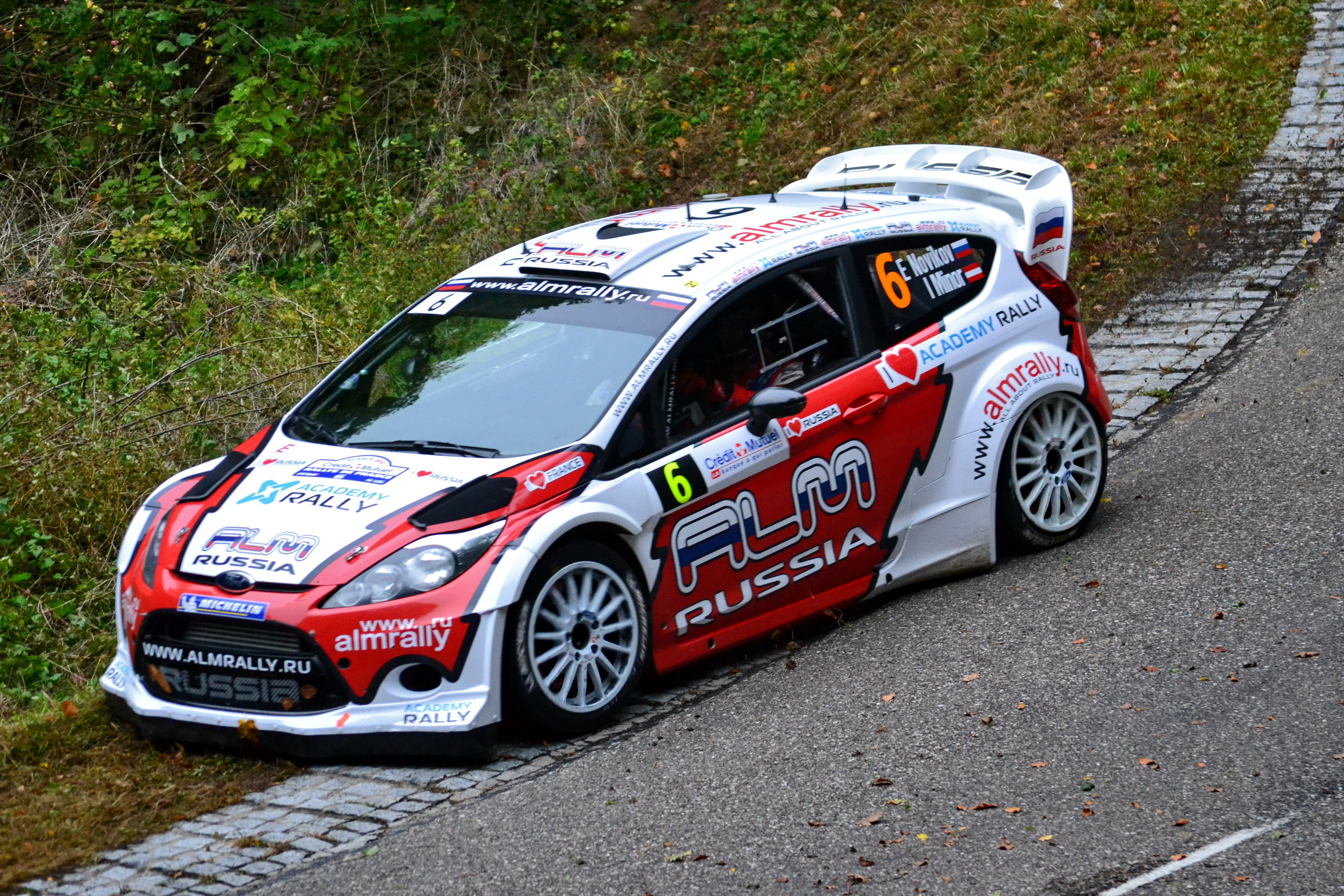
Evgeny Novikov drives for M-Sport Ford.

- Chris Atkinson returned to the WRC to contest the Rally of Mexico with the Monster World Rally Team. He also drove at the Rally of Finland on behalf of the Qatar World Rally Team as Nasser Al-Attiyah was competing at the London Olympic Games, and later joined WRC Team Mini Portugal in the place of Armindo Araújo for the Rally of Germany. Atkinson's last appearance at the WRC level was a one-off drive with the Citroën Junior Team at the 2009 Rally Ireland.
- Ken Block will contest a reduced WRC program, appearing at Rally Mexico, Rally New Zealand and Rally Finland.
- The Citroën World Rally Team will expand to a three-car operation, entering a third Citroën DS3 WRC for 2011 Dakar Rally winner Nasser Al-Attiyah. Al-Attiyah was originally scheduled to contest every event with the exception of the Rallye Monte Carlo owing to a date clash with the 2012 Dakar Rally. However, Al-Attiyah was selected to represent his native Qatar at the London Olympics in skeet shooting and was forced to miss the Rally of New Zealand and the Rally of Finland.
- François Delecour returned to the WRC to compete in the 80ème Rallye Automobile de Monte-Carlo. Delecour drove a Ford Fiesta RS WRC in the rally, his last event at the WRC level since the 2002 Rally of Great Britain. The Rallye Monte Carlo is Delecour's only planned appearance in the 2012 season.
- 2011 championship runner-up Mikko Hirvonen and co-driver Jarmo Lehtinen moved from the Ford World Rally Team to Citroën.
- Jari-Matti Latvala was injured in an accident during a training exercise two weeks before Rally Argentina, forcing him out of the event. He was replaced by Dani Sordo for the event.
- Lotus Cars planned to enter a Lotus Exige R-GT at all tarmac events on the 2012 calendar, pending the homologation of the car. The Lotus Exige R-GT was Lotus' first entry in the World Rally Championship since the Talbot Sunbeam Lotus in 1983 Rally of Portugal, but the team later changed their plans and the team made its debut appearance at the Rali Vinho da Madeira, a round of the European Rally Championship instead of the WRC.
- Mini WRC Team will only enter one works driver in selected events of 2012, after the team was unable to find the budget for two full-time entries. Dani Sordo will enter in every event, with the second car driven by local competitors. The team has stated that Kris Meeke will not compete in every rally, but will remain a part of the team. On 6 February 2012, it was announced that the status of the Prodrive-operated team had been demoted to a works-supported private team, while the Motorsport Italia-run WRC Team Mini Portugal became the factory team of Mini. The team was renamed "Prodrive WRC Team" before the Rally de Portugal.
- Thierry Neuville, winner of the 2011 Tour de Corse in the Intercontinental Rally Challenge, will compete in nine rallies at the WRC level – with a provision for two more – in a Citroën DS3 WRC prepared by Citroën Racing Technology and run by PH Sport, which was re-opened after being closed down for the 2011 season. He also drove for the Qatar World Rally Team at the Rally of New Zealand. Neuville had previously contested the Junior World Rally Championship in with a Citroën C2 S1600 in 2010.
- Evgenij Novikov and Ott Tänak will join the M-Sport Ford World Rally Team.
- Sébastien Ogier was released from his three-year contract with Citroën after just one season. Ogier later joined Volkswagen to develop the Polo R WRC for their 2013 WRC entry, while contesting the full 2012 WRC schedule in a Škoda Fabia S2000 with regular co-driver Julien Ingrassia.
- Martin Prokop, who previously competed in the Super 2000 World Rally Championship, will take part in ten rallies driving a Ford Fiesta RS WRC.
- 2007 Formula One World Champion Kimi Räikkönen returned to Formula One. The WRC arm of his Ice 1 Racing team was subsequently shut down.
- Former M-Sport drivers Henning Solberg and Matthew Wilson joined the newly formed non-manufacturer Go Fast Energy World Rally Team with the intention of completing the season, but the team only appeared at the Rally Monte Carlo and the Rally of Sweden. Wilson later re-joined M-Sport for a one-off appearance at the Wales Rally GB.
- 2003 World Champion Petter Solberg secured a seat with the Ford World Rally Team. His privately entered team, with which he had competed with between 2009 and 2011, was closed down.
- Munchi's Ford World Rally Team left the WRC after the 2011 season.

=== SWRC entries ===
No	Team	Driver	Co-driver	Car	Rounds
31	(Spain) ASM Motorsport	(New Zealand) Hayden Paddon	(New Zealand) John Kennard	Škoda Fabia S2000	2, 4, 7
31	(Austria) Baumschlager Rallye & Racing	(New Zealand) Hayden Paddon	(New Zealand) John Kennard	Škoda Fabia S2000	8, 10–11, 13
32	(Republic of Ireland) Keltech Motorsport	(Republic of Ireland) Craig Breen	(United Kingdom) Gareth Roberts	Ford Fiesta S2000	1–2, 4
32	(Republic of Ireland) Keltech Motorsport	(Republic of Ireland) Craig Breen	(Republic of Ireland) Paul Nagle	Ford Fiesta S2000	8, 10–11, 13
33	(Malaysia) Proton Motorsports	(Sweden) Per-Gunnar Andersson	(Sweden) Emil Axelsson	Proton Satria Neo S2000	1–2, 7–8, 10–11, 13
34	(Malaysia) Proton Motorsports	(Italy) Giandomenico Basso	(Italy) Mitia Dotta	Proton Satria Neo S2000	1
34	(Malaysia) Proton Motorsports	(United Kingdom) Alister McRae	(Australia) Bill Hayes	Proton Satria Neo S2000	2, 7
34	(Malaysia) Proton Motorsports	(Finland) Juha Salo	(Finland) Marko Salminen	Proton Satria Neo S2000	8
34	(Malaysia) Proton Motorsports	(United Kingdom) Tom Cave	(United Kingdom) Craig Parry	Proton Satria Neo S2000	10
34	(Malaysia) Proton Motorsports	(Austria) Andreas Aigner	(Germany) Detlef Ruf	Proton Satria Neo S2000	11
34	(Malaysia) Proton Motorsports	(United Kingdom) Alastair Fisher	(United Kingdom) Daniel Barritt	Proton Satria Neo S2000	13
35	(Poland) Castrol TRW Motointegrator	(Poland) Maciej Oleksowicz	(Poland) Andrzej Obrebowski	Ford Fiesta S2000	2, 4, 7–8, 10–11, 13
36	(Saudi Arabia) Yazeed Racing	(Saudi Arabia) Yazeed Al-Rajhi	(United Kingdom) Michael Orr	Ford Fiesta RRC	2, 4, 7–8, 10–11, 13
37	(Germany) Volkswagen Motorsport	(France) Sébastien Ogier	(France) Julien Ingrassia	Škoda Fabia S2000	1–6, 8–13
37	(Germany) Volkswagen Motorsport	(Netherlands) Kevin Abbring	(Belgium) Lara Vanneste	Škoda Fabia S2000	1
37	(Germany) Volkswagen Motorsport	(Netherlands) Kevin Abbring	(Belgium) Frédéric Miclotte	Škoda Fabia S2000	3-4, 10
37	(Germany) Volkswagen Motorsport	(Norway) Andreas Mikkelsen	(Norway) Ola Fløene	Škoda Fabia S2000	2, 5–6, 8–9, 11–13
37	(Germany) Volkswagen Motorsport	(Germany) Sepp Wiegand	(Germany) Timo Gottschalk	Škoda Fabia S2000	9
Additional guest entries
49	(Norway) Even Management	(Sweden) Pontus Tidemand	(Sweden) Göran Bergsten	Škoda Fabia S2000	2
63	(Norway) Gundersen Motorsport	(Norway) Marius Aasen	(Norway) Veronica Engan	Ford Fiesta S2000	2
49	(Portugal) Team Vianauto/Galp Formula	(Portugal) Pedro Meireles	(Portugal) Mário Castro	Mitsubishi Lancer Evo X R4	4
49	(Finland) Printsport	(Finland) Esapekka Lappi	(Finland) Janne Ferm	Ford Fiesta S2000	8
49	(United Kingdom) M-Sport	(United Kingdom) Alastair Fisher	(United Kingdom) Daniel Barritt	Ford Fiesta S2000	10
49	(Spain) PCR Sport	(Andorra) Albert Llovera	(Spain) Diego Vallejo	Fiat Abarth Grande Punto S2000	13

Team and driver changes

- Bryan Bouffier, who won the 79ème Rallye Automobile de Monte-Carlo when it was a part of the Intercontinental Rally Challenge, will compete in 2012 Monte Carlo Rally with a Peugeot 207 S2000.
- Craig Breen, winner of the 2011 WRC Academy will enter the Super 2000 championship driving a Ford Fiesta S2000.
- Proton will enter the Super 2000 category for the first time, entering two Proton Satria Neos into the Rallye Monte Carlo for Per-Gunnar Andersson and Giandomenico Basso, with Alister McRae making an appearance later in the season. The team will compete at seven selected events in the 2012 season.
- Hayden Paddon, the 2011 Group N World Champion, will contest the Super 2000 championship, driving a Škoda Fabia S2000 prepared by Spanish team ASM Motorsport.

=== PWRC entries ===
No	Team	Driver	Co-driver	Car	Rounds
31	(Poland) Lotos Dynamic Rally Team	(Poland) Michał Kościuszko	(Poland) Maciek Szczepaniak	Mitsubishi Lancer Evo X	1, 3, 5, 9, 12–13
32	(Peru) FRT Rally	(Peru) Nicolás Fuchs	(Argentina) Rubén García	Mitsubishi Lancer Evo X	1
32	(Peru) FRT Rally	(Peru) Nicolás Fuchs	(Argentina) Fernando Mussano	Mitsubishi Lancer Evo X	3, 5
32	(Belgium) Symtech Racing	(Peru) Nicolás Fuchs	(Argentina) Fernando Mussano	Subaru Impreza WRX STI	6, 9, 12–13
33	(Italy) Top Run Motorsport	(Argentina) Marcos Ligato	(Argentina) Rubén García	Subaru Impreza WRX STI	5–7, 9, 12–13
34	(Italy) Miele Racing	(Italy) Lorenzo Bertelli	(Italy) Lorenzo Granai	Mitsubishi Lancer Evo IX	1, 5
34	(Italy) Miele Racing	(Italy) Lorenzo Bertelli	(Italy) Lorenzo Granai	Subaru Impreza WRX STI	6–7, 12–13
36	(United Kingdom) Rally Team GB	(United Kingdom) Louise Cook	(United Kingdom) Stefan Davis	Ford Fiesta ST	1, 6–7, 12
36	(United Kingdom) Rally Team GB	(United Kingdom) Louise Cook	(United Kingdom) Stefan Davis	Ford Fiesta R2	9, 13
38	Ralliart Italy	(Mexico) Benito Guerra	(Spain) Borja Rozada	Mitsubishi Lancer Evo X	3, 5–6, 9, 12–13
39	(Ukraine) Mentos Ascania Racing	(Ukraine) Valeriy Gorban	(Ukraine) Andriy Nikolaiev	Mitsubishi Lancer Evo IX	5–7, 9, 12–13
41	(Ukraine) Mentos Ascania Racing	(Ukraine) Oleksiy Kikireshko	(Ukraine) Pavlo Cherepin	Mitsubishi Lancer Evo IX	5–7
41	(Ukraine) Mentos Ascania Racing	(Ukraine) Oleksiy Kikireshko	(Estonia) Sergei Larens	Mitsubishi Lancer Evo IX	9, 12–13
40	(Italy) G.B. Motors	(Italy) Gianluca Linari	(Italy) Nicola Arena	Subaru Impreza WRX STI	3, 5, 7
40	(Italy) G.B. Motors	(Italy) Gianluca Linari	(Italy) Monica Fortunato	Subaru Impreza WRX STI	6
40	(Italy) G.B. Motors	(Italy) Gianluca Linari	(Italy) Andrea Cecchi	Subaru Impreza WRX STI	12–13
42	(Mexico) Triviño World Rally Team	(Mexico) Ricardo Triviño	(Spain) Àlex Haro	Mitsubishi Lancer Evo X	5
42	(Mexico) Triviño World Rally Team	(Mexico) Ricardo Triviño	(Spain) Àlex Haro	Subaru Impreza WRX STI	6, 9, 12–13
42	(Mexico) Triviño World Rally Team	(Mexico) Ricardo Triviño	(Spain) Àlex Haro	Mitsubishi Lancer Evo IX	7
44	(Sweden) Ramona Rallying	(Sweden) Ramona Karlsson	(Sweden) Miriam Walfridsson	Mitsubishi Lancer Evo X	3, 5, 7, 9, 12–13
45	(Indonesia) Bosowa Rally Team	(Indonesia) Subhan Aksa	(Indonesia) Hade Mboi	Mitsubishi Lancer Evo X	5
45	(Indonesia) Bosowa Rally Team	(Indonesia) Subhan Aksa	(New Zealand) Jeff Judd	Mitsubishi Lancer Evo X	6–7, 9
45	(Indonesia) Bosowa Rally Team	(Indonesia) Subhan Aksa	(Italy) Nicola Arena	Mitsubishi Lancer Evo X	12
45	(Indonesia) Bosowa Rally Team	(Indonesia) Subhan Aksa	(Australia) Bill Hayes	Mitsubishi Lancer Evo X	13
Additional guest entries
49	(Mexico) Salgado Rally Team	(Mexico) Rodrigo Salgado	(Mexico) Diódoro Salgado	Mitsubishi Lancer Evo IX	3
49	(Argentina) CRS Team	(Argentina) Ezequiel Campos	(Argentina) Cristian Winkler	Mitsubishi Lancer Evo X	5
49	(Spain) RMC Motorsport	(Spain) Yeray Lemes	(Spain) Rogelio Peñate	Mitsubishi Lancer Evo X	13
50	(Spain) Escuderia Gironella	(Spain) Josep Maria Membrado	(Spain) Josep Ramón Ribolledo	Mitsubishi Lancer Evo X	13

=== WRC Academy entries ===
The WRC Academy uses identical Ford Fiesta R2s.

Driver	Co-driver	Rounds
(United States) Christopher Duplessis	(Republic of Ireland) Karl Atkinson	4, 6
(United States) Christopher Duplessis	(United States) Alexander Kihurani	8
(Spain) José Antonio Suárez	(Spain) Cándido Carrera	4, 6, 8–9, 11, 13
(United Kingdom) Alastair Fisher	(United Kingdom) Daniel Barritt	4, 6, 8–9, 11
(United Kingdom) Mark Donnelly	(United Kingdom) Dai Roberts	4
(Sweden) Pontus Tidemand	(Norway) Stig Rune Skjærmoen	4, 6, 8, 11, 13
(Sweden) Pontus Tidemand	(Sweden) Emil Axelsson	9
(Australia) Brendan Reeves	(Australia) Rhianon Smyth	4, 6, 8–9, 11, 13
(Netherlands) Timo van der Marel	(Netherlands) Erwin Berkhof	4, 6, 8–9, 11, 13
(United Kingdom) John MacCrone	(United Kingdom) Stuart Loudon	4, 6, 8–9, 11, 13
(United Kingdom) Elfyn Evans	(United Kingdom) Andrew Edwards	4, 6
(United Kingdom) Elfyn Evans	(United Kingdom) Philip Pugh	8–9, 11
(United Kingdom) Elfyn Evans	(United Kingdom) Sebastian Marshall	13
(Spain) Yeray Lemes	(Spain) Rogelio Peñate	4
(Portugal) João Silva	(Portugal) José Janela	4
(Portugal) João Silva	(Portugal) Hugo Magalhães	6, 8–9
(South Africa) Ashley Haigh-Smith	(United Kingdom) Craig Parry	4, 6, 8–9
(Sweden) Fredrik Åhlin	(Norway) Morten Erik Abrahamsen	4, 6, 8–9, 11, 13
Entries not scoring Academy points
(Slovakia) Martin Koči	(Czech Republic) Lukáš Zámečník	9
(Poland) Aron Domzala	(Poland) Kacper Pietrusinski	13

== Results and standings ==
=== Results and statistics ===
Colour	Rally Surface
Gold	Gravel
Silver	Tarmac
Blue	Snow/Ice
Bronze	Mixed Surface

Round	Rally name	Podium finishers				Statistics			
Round	Rally name	Rank	Driver	Car	Time	Stages	Length	Starters	Finishers
1	(Monaco) Monte Carlo Rally (18–22 January) – Results and report	1	(France) Sébastien Loeb	Citroën DS3 WRC	4:32:39.9	18	433.36 km	82	54
1	(Monaco) Monte Carlo Rally (18–22 January) – Results and report	2	(Spain) Dani Sordo	Mini John Cooper Works WRC	4:35:25.4	18	433.36 km	82	54
1	(Monaco) Monte Carlo Rally (18–22 January) – Results and report	3	(Norway) Petter Solberg	Ford Fiesta RS WRC	4:35:54.1	18	433.36 km	82	54
2	Rally Sweden (9–12 February) – Results and report	1	(Finland) Jari-Matti Latvala	Ford Fiesta RS WRC	3:18:28.3	24	349.16 km	50	42
2	Rally Sweden (9–12 February) – Results and report	2	(Finland) Mikko Hirvonen	Citroën DS3 WRC	3:18:44.9	24	349.16 km	50	42
2	Rally Sweden (9–12 February) – Results and report	3	(Norway) Mads Østberg	Ford Fiesta RS WRC	3:19:07.1	24	349.16 km	50	42
3	Rally Mexico (8–11 March) – Results and report	1	(France) Sébastien Loeb	Citroën DS3 WRC	4:15:32.7	(24)^{†} 22	(408.50 km)^{†} 382.60 km	27	19
3	Rally Mexico (8–11 March) – Results and report	2	(Finland) Mikko Hirvonen	Citroën DS3 WRC	4:16:15.1	(24)^{†} 22	(408.50 km)^{†} 382.60 km	27	19
3	Rally Mexico (8–11 March) – Results and report	3	(Norway) Petter Solberg	Ford Fiesta RS WRC	4:17:44.1	(24)^{†} 22	(408.50 km)^{†} 382.60 km	27	19
4	Rally de Portugal (29 March – 1 April) – Results and report	1	(Norway) Mads Østberg	Ford Fiesta RS WRC	4:21:16.3	(22)^{†} 19	(434.77 km)^{†} 368.43 km	49	30
4	Rally de Portugal (29 March – 1 April) – Results and report	2	(Russia) Evgeny Novikov	Ford Fiesta RS WRC	4:22:49.3	(22)^{†} 19	(434.77 km)^{†} 368.43 km	49	30
4	Rally de Portugal (29 March – 1 April) – Results and report	3	(Norway) Petter Solberg	Ford Fiesta RS WRC	4:23:11.7	(22)^{†} 19	(434.77 km)^{†} 368.43 km	49	30
5	Rally Argentina (26–29 April) – Results and report	1	(France) Sébastien Loeb	Citroën DS3 WRC	5:34:38.8	19	502.73 km	42	27
5	Rally Argentina (26–29 April) – Results and report	2	(Finland) Mikko Hirvonen	Citroën DS3 WRC	5:34:54.0	19	502.73 km	42	27
5	Rally Argentina (26–29 April) – Results and report	3	(Norway) Mads Østberg	Ford Fiesta RS WRC	5:37:49.2	19	502.73 km	42	27
6	(Greece) Acropolis Rally (24–27 May) – Results and report	1	(France) Sébastien Loeb	Citroën DS3 WRC	4:42:03.3	22	409.47 km	54	32
6	(Greece) Acropolis Rally (24–27 May) – Results and report	2	(Finland) Mikko Hirvonen	Citroën DS3 WRC	4:42:43.3	22	409.47 km	54	32
6	(Greece) Acropolis Rally (24–27 May) – Results and report	3	(Finland) Jari-Matti Latvala	Ford Fiesta RS WRC	4:45:08.1	22	409.47 km	54	32
7	Rally New Zealand (22–24 June) – Results and report	1	(France) Sébastien Loeb	Citroën DS3 WRC	4:04:51.2	22	413.94 km	41	35
7	Rally New Zealand (22–24 June) – Results and report	2	(Finland) Mikko Hirvonen	Citroën DS3 WRC	4:05:20.8	22	413.94 km	41	35
7	Rally New Zealand (22–24 June) – Results and report	3	(Norway) Petter Solberg	Ford Fiesta RS WRC	4:06:27.6	22	413.94 km	41	35
8	Rally Finland (2–4 August) – Results and report	1	(France) Sébastien Loeb	Citroën DS3 WRC	2:28:11.4	18	303.52 km	81	53
8	Rally Finland (2–4 August) – Results and report	2	(Finland) Mikko Hirvonen	Citroën DS3 WRC	2:28:17.5	18	303.52 km	81	53
8	Rally Finland (2–4 August) – Results and report	3	(Finland) Jari-Matti Latvala	Ford Fiesta RS WRC	2:28:46.4	18	303.52 km	81	53
9	(Germany) Rallye Deutschland (24–26 August) – Results and report	1	(France) Sébastien Loeb	Citroën DS3 WRC	3:41:52.4	15	368.63 km	71	40
9	(Germany) Rallye Deutschland (24–26 August) – Results and report	2	(Finland) Jari-Matti Latvala	Ford Fiesta RS WRC	3:43:52.5	15	368.63 km	71	40
9	(Germany) Rallye Deutschland (24–26 August) – Results and report	3	(Finland) Mikko Hirvonen	Citroën DS3 WRC	3:44:23.8	15	368.63 km	71	40
10	(United Kingdom) Wales Rally GB (14–16 September) – Results and report	1	(Finland) Jari-Matti Latvala	Ford Fiesta RS WRC	3:03:40.3	19	324.92 km	31	29
10	(United Kingdom) Wales Rally GB (14–16 September) – Results and report	2	(France) Sébastien Loeb	Citroën DS3 WRC	3:04:08.1	19	324.92 km	31	29
10	(United Kingdom) Wales Rally GB (14–16 September) – Results and report	3	(Norway) Petter Solberg	Ford Fiesta RS WRC	3:04:09.0	19	324.92 km	31	29
11	Rallye de France Alsace (4–7 October) – Results and report	1	(France) Sébastien Loeb	Citroën DS3 WRC	3:32:53.0	(22)^{†} 21	(404.14 km)^{†} 393.39 km	69	45
11	Rallye de France Alsace (4–7 October) – Results and report	2	(Finland) Jari-Matti Latvala	Ford Fiesta RS WRC	3:33:08.5	(22)^{†} 21	(404.14 km)^{†} 393.39 km	69	45
11	Rallye de France Alsace (4–7 October) – Results and report	3	(Finland) Mikko Hirvonen	Citroën DS3 WRC	3:33:37.1	(22)^{†} 21	(404.14 km)^{†} 393.39 km	69	45
12	(Italy) Rally Italia Sardegna (18–21 October) – Results and report	1	(Finland) Mikko Hirvonen	Citroën DS3 WRC	3:23:54.9	16	305.80 km	41	32
12	(Italy) Rally Italia Sardegna (18–21 October) – Results and report	2	(Russia) Evgeny Novikov	Ford Fiesta RS WRC	3:25:15.5	16	305.80 km	41	32
12	(Italy) Rally Italia Sardegna (18–21 October) – Results and report	3	(Estonia) Ott Tänak	Ford Fiesta RS WRC	3:26:16.0	16	305.80 km	41	32
13	(Spain) Rally Catalunya (8–11 November) – Results and report	1	(France) Sébastien Loeb	Citroën DS3 WRC	4:14:29.1	18	405.46 km	70	52
13	(Spain) Rally Catalunya (8–11 November) – Results and report	2	(Finland) Jari-Matti Latvala	Ford Fiesta RS WRC	4:14:36.1	18	405.46 km	70	52
13	(Spain) Rally Catalunya (8–11 November) – Results and report	3	(Finland) Mikko Hirvonen	Citroën DS3 WRC	4:16:15.9	18	405.46 km	70	52

Notes

- † – Event was shortened after stages were cancelled.

=== Standings ===
==== Drivers' championship ====
Points are awarded to the top 10 classified finishers.

Position	1st	2nd	3rd	4th	5th	6th	7th	8th	9th	10th
Points	25	18	15	12	10	8	6	4	2	1

Pos.	Driver	MON (Monaco)	SWE (Sweden)	MEX (Mexico)	POR (Portugal)	ARG (Argentina)	GRE (Greece)	NZL (New Zealand)	FIN (Finland)	GER (Germany)	GBR (United Kingdom)	FRA (France)	ITA (Italy)	ESP (Spain)	Points
1	(France) Sébastien Loeb	1 ^{1}	6 ^{1}	1 ^{2}	Ret	1	1 ^{1}	1 ^{3}	1 ^{3}	1 ^{1}	2 ^{2}	1	Ret	1 ^{3}	270
2	(Finland) Mikko Hirvonen	4 ^{2}	2	2	EX	2 ^{2}	2 ^{3}	2	2 ^{1}	3 ^{2}	5 ^{1}	3	1	3	213
3	(Finland) Jari-Matti Latvala	Ret	1 ^{3}	Ret	13 ^{2}		3 ^{2}	7 ^{1}	3	2	1 ^{3}	2	12 ^{2}	2 ^{1}	154
4	(Norway) Mads Østberg		3	4 ^{3}	1	3	4		5	4	4	5 ^{3}	4	4	149
5	(Norway) Petter Solberg	3	4 ^{2}	3 ^{1}	3	6 ^{1}	Ret	3 ^{2}	4 ^{2}	11	3	26	9 ^{1}	11	124
6	(Russia) Evgeny Novikov	5 ^{3}	5	Ret	2	8	Ret	4	36	Ret	6	7	2	10	88
7	(Belgium) Thierry Neuville	Ret	12	13	8	5	6	5	16	12	7	4 ^{2}	18 ^{3}	12	53
8	(Estonia) Ott Tänak	8	Ret	5	14 ^{3}	10	9	Ret	6	Ret	Ret	6 ^{1}	3	Ret	52
9	(Czech Republic) Martin Prokop	9	9		5	4	5		9	Ret	9	9	8	13	46
10	(France) Sébastien Ogier	Ret	11	8	7	7	7		10	6	12	11	5	Ret	41
11	(Spain) Dani Sordo	2	Ret		11 ^{1}	Ret		6		9		Ret		9 ^{2}	35
12	(Qatar) Nasser Al-Attiyah		21	6	4	9 ^{3}	Ret			8	10	Ret			28
13	(Australia) Chris Atkinson		WD	Ret					39	5	11	8	6	7	28
14	(Norway) Andreas Mikkelsen		13			Ret	Ret		27	7 ^{3}		12	7	21	13
15	(Portugal) Armindo Araújo	10	15	7	15	Ret	11	8	15						11
16	(Finland) Jarkko Nikara								13					5	10
17	(Republic of Ireland) Craig Breen	14	16		Ret				Ret		13	17		6	8
18	(France) François Delecour	6													8
19	(Netherlands) Dennis Kuipers				6										8
20	(Norway) Henning Solberg	13	7	WD	WD		WD	WD	WD						6
21	(France) Pierre Campana	7													6
22	(Finland) Matti Rantanen								7						6
23	(Finland) Jari Ketomaa		Ret		9			11	8						6
24	(Sweden) Per-Gunnar Andersson	Ret	14					23	11		24	24		8	4
25	(United Kingdom) Matthew Wilson	11	WD								8				4
26	(Saudi Arabia) Yazeed Al-Rajhi		24		Ret		8	28	17	Ret	16	18		15	4
27	(Sweden) Patrik Sandell		8		Ret										4
28	(United States) Ken Block			9				9	Ret						4
29	(Qatar) Abdulaziz Al-Kuwari						10							14	1
30	(France) Sébastien Chardonnet	19			25		28		33	15	19	10			1
31	(Mexico) Ricardo Triviño			10	26	Ret	16	19		22		28	22	35	1
32	(France) Mathieu Arzeno	Ret								10	18	Ret			1
33	(Netherlands) Peter van Merksteijn Jr.		19		10					Ret					1
34	(Norway) Eyvind Brynildsen		10												1
35	(Austria) Manfred Stohl							10							1
36	(Italy) Luca Pedersoli												10		1
Pos.	Driver	MON (Monaco)	SWE (Sweden)	MEX (Mexico)	POR (Portugal)	ARG (Argentina)	GRE (Greece)	NZL (New Zealand)	FIN (Finland)	GER (Germany)	GBR (United Kingdom)	FRA (France)	ITA (Italy)	ESP (Spain)	Points

Key
Colour	Result
Gold	Winner
Silver	2nd place
Bronze	3rd place
Green	Points finish
Blue	Non-points finish
Blue	Non-classified finish (NC)
Purple	Did not finish (Ret)
Black	Excluded (EX)
Black	Disqualified (DSQ)
White	Did not start (DNS)
White	Cancelled (C)
Blank	Withdrew entry from the event (WD)

- Sébastien Loeb secured the drivers' championship title in France.

Notes:

- ^{1} ^{2} ^{3} refers to the classification of the drivers on the 'Power Stage', where bonus points are awarded 3–2–1 for the fastest three drivers on the stage.

==== Co-drivers' championship ====
Pos.	Co-driver	MON (Monaco)	SWE (Sweden)	MEX (Mexico)	POR (Portugal)	ARG (Argentina)	GRE (Greece)	NZL (New Zealand)	FIN (Finland)	GER (Germany)	GBR (United Kingdom)	FRA (France)	ITA (Italy)	ESP (Spain)	Points
1	(Monaco) Daniel Elena	1 ^{1}	6 ^{1}	1 ^{2}	Ret	1	1 ^{1}	1 ^{3}	1 ^{3}	1 ^{1}	2 ^{2}	1	Ret	1 ^{3}	270
2	(Finland) Jarmo Lehtinen	4 ^{2}	2	2	EX	2 ^{2}	2 ^{3}	2	2 ^{1}	3 ^{2}	5 ^{1}	3	1	3	213
3	(Finland) Miikka Anttila	Ret	1 ^{3}	Ret	13 ^{2}		3 ^{2}	7 ^{1}	3	2	1 ^{3}	2	12 ^{2}	2 ^{1}	154
4	(Sweden) Jonas Andersson		3	4 ^{3}	1	3	4		5	4	4	5 ^{3}	4	4	149
5	(United Kingdom) Chris Patterson	3	4 ^{2}	3 ^{1}	3	6 ^{1}	Ret	3 ^{2}	4 ^{2}	11	3	26	9 ^{1}	11	124
6	(France) Denis Giraudet	5 ^{3}	5	Ret	2	8	Ret	4	36						55
7	(Belgium) Nicolas Gilsoul	Ret	12	13	8	5	6	5	16	12	7	4 ^{2}	19 ^{3}	12	53
8	(Estonia) Kuldar Sikk	8	Ret	5	14 ^{3}	10	9	Ret	6	Ret	Ret	6 ^{1}	3	Ret	52
9	(Czech Republic) Zdeněk Hrůza	9	9		5	4	5		9	Ret	9	9	8	13	46
10	(France) Julien Ingrassia	Ret	11	8	7	7	7		10	6	12	11	5	Ret	41
11	(Austria) Ilka Minor	13	7	WD	WD		WD	10	WD		6	7	2	10	40
12	(Spain) Carlos del Barrio	2	Ret		11 ^{1}	Ret		6		9		Ret		9 ^{2}	35
13	(Italy) Giovanni Bernacchini		21	6	4	9 ^{3}	Ret			8	10	Ret			28
14	(Belgium) Stéphane Prévot		WD	Ret					39	5	11	8	6	7	28
15	(Norway) Ola Floene		13			Ret	Ret		27	7 ^{3}		12	7	21	13
16	(Portugal) Miguel Ramalho	10	15	7	15	Ret	11	8	15						11
17	(Finland) Jarkko Kalliolepo													5	10
18	(Republic of Ireland) Paul Nagle								Ret		13	17		6	8
19	(France) Dominique Savignoni	6													8
20	(Belgium) Robin Buysmans				6										8
21	(France) Sabrina de Castelli	7													6
22	(Finland) Mikko Lukka								7						6
23	(Finland) Mika Stenberg		Ret		9			11	8						6
24	(Sweden) Emil Axelsson	Ret	14					23	11		24	24		8	4
25	(United Kingdom) Scott Martin	11	WD								8				4
26	(United Kingdom) Michael Orr		24		Ret		8	28	17	Ret	16	18		15	4
27	(Sweden) Staffan Parmander		8												4
28	(Italy) Alex Gelsomino			9				9	Ret						4
29	(Republic of Ireland) Killian Duffy						10							14	1
30	(France) Thibault de la Haye	19			25		28		33	15	19	10			1
31	(Spain) Alex Haro			10	26	Ret	16	19		22		28	22	35	1
32	(Belgium) Renaud Jamoul	Ret								10	18	Ret			1
33	(Belgium) Eddy Chevailler		19		10					Ret					1
34	(Norway) Cato Menkerud		10												1
35	(Italy) Matteo Romano												10		1
Pos.	Co-driver	MON (Monaco)	SWE (Sweden)	MEX (Mexico)	POR (Portugal)	ARG (Argentina)	GRE (Greece)	NZL (New Zealand)	FIN (Finland)	GER (Germany)	GBR (United Kingdom)	FRA (France)	ITA (Italy)	ESP (Spain)	Points

==== Manufacturers' championship ====
Pos.	Manufacturer	No.	MON (Monaco)	SWE (Sweden)	MEX (Mexico)	POR (Portugal)	ARG (Argentina)	GRE (Greece)	NZL (New Zealand)	FIN (Finland)	GER (Germany)	GBR (United Kingdom)	FRA (France)	ITA (Italy)	ESP (Spain)	Points
1	(France) Citroën Total World Rally Team	1	1	5	1	Ret	1	1	1	1	1	2	1	Ret	1	453
1	(France) Citroën Total World Rally Team	2	4	2	2	EX	2	2	2	2	3	5	3	1	3	453
2	(United Kingdom) Ford World Rally Team	3	Ret	1	Ret	6	Ret	3	6	3	2	1	2	5	2	309
2	(United Kingdom) Ford World Rally Team	4	3	3	3	2	5	Ret	3	4	6	3	8	4	5	309
3	(United Kingdom) M-Sport Ford World Rally Team	5	7	Ret	5	7	8	5	Ret	6	Ret	Ret	6	3	Ret	170
3	(United Kingdom) M-Sport Ford World Rally Team	6	5	4	Ret	1	6	Ret	4	8	Ret	6	7	2	Ret	170
4	(Norway) Adapta World Rally Team	10			4		3			5	4	4	5		4	83
5	(France) Citroën Junior World Rally Team	8			7	4	4	4		7	7	7	4			72
6	Qatar World Rally Team	7		6	6	3	7	Ret	5	9	5	8	Ret	6	Ret	71
7	Brazil World Rally Team	9				5	Ret	Ret	7		8		Ret		6	28
8	(United Kingdom) Mini WRC Team ^{†}	37	2													26
8	(United Kingdom) Mini WRC Team ^{†}	52	6													26
–	(Portugal) Armindo Araújo World Rally Team ^{‡}	12	8													0
–	(Brazil) Palmeirinha Rally ^{‡}	14	9													0
Pos.	Manufacturer	No.	MON (Monaco)	SWE (Sweden)	MEX (Mexico)	POR (Portugal)	ARG (Argentina)	GRE (Greece)	NZL (New Zealand)	FIN (Finland)	GER (Germany)	GBR (United Kingdom)	FRA (France)	ITA (Italy)	ESP (Spain)	Points

Key
Colour	Result
Gold	Winner
Silver	2nd place
Bronze	3rd place
Green	Points finish
Blue	Non-points finish
Blue	Non-classified finish (NC)
Purple	Did not finish (Ret)
Black	Excluded (EX)
Black	Disqualified (DSQ)
White	Did not start (DNS)
White	Cancelled (C)
Blank	Withdrew entry from the event (WD)

- Citroën secured the manufacturers' championship in France.

Notes:

- † — The Mini WRC Team lost its manufacturer status in February when parent company BMW withdrew works support from the team, demoting them to customer team status. The team kept the points it scored on Rallye Monte Carlo although it was no longer classified as a manufacturer entrant. They were replaced by the WRC Team Mini Portugal as the official Mini works team.
- ‡ – Armindo Araújo World Rally Team and Palmeirinha Rally merged to form WRC Team Mini Portugal. The points they scored at the Rallye Monte Carlo were removed from the manufacturers' championship.

==== SWRC Drivers' championship ====
Pos.	Driver	MON (Monaco)	SWE (Sweden)	POR (Portugal)	NZL (New Zealand)	FIN (Finland)	GBR (United Kingdom)	FRA (France)	ESP (Spain)	Points
1	(Republic of Ireland) Craig Breen	1	2	Ret		Ret	1	1	1	118
2	(Sweden) Per-Gunnar Andersson	Ret	1		2	1	6	3	2	109
3	(Saudi Arabia) Yazeed Al-Rajhi		5	Ret	4	2	3	2	3	88
4	(New Zealand) Hayden Paddon		4	1	1	Ret	7	Ret	5	78
5	(Poland) Maciej Oleksowicz		6	2	3	4	4	Ret	Ret	65
6	(United Kingdom) Alastair Fisher						5		4	22
7	(United Kingdom) Tom Cave						2			18
8	(Sweden) Pontus Tidemand		3							15
9	(Portugal) Pedro Meireles			3						15
10	(Finland) Juha Salo					3				15
11	(Austria) Andreas Aigner							4		12
12	(Finland) Esapekka Lappi					5				10
13	(United Kingdom) Alister McRae		7		Ret					6
—	(Italy) Giandomenico Basso	Ret								0
—	(Norway) Marius Aasen		Ret							0
—	(Andorra) Albert Llovera								Ret	0
Pos.	Driver	MON (Monaco)	SWE (Sweden)	POR (Portugal)	NZL (New Zealand)	FIN (Finland)	GBR (United Kingdom)	FRA (France)	ESP (Spain)	Points

Key
Colour	Result
Gold	Winner
Silver	2nd place
Bronze	3rd place
Green	Points finish
Blue	Non-points finish
Blue	Non-classified finish (NC)
Purple	Did not finish (Ret)
Black	Excluded (EX)
Black	Disqualified (DSQ)
White	Did not start (DNS)
White	Cancelled (C)
Blank	Withdrew entry from the event (WD)

===== Co-drivers =====
Pos.	Co-driver	MON (Monaco)	SWE (Sweden)	POR (Portugal)	NZL (New Zealand)	FIN (Finland)	GBR (United Kingdom)	FRA (France)	ESP (Spain)	Points
1	(Sweden) Emil Axelsson	Ret	1		2	1	6	3	2	109
2	(United Kingdom) Michael Orr		5	Ret	4	2	3	2	3	88
3	(New Zealand) John Kennard		4	1	1	Ret	7	Ret	5	78
4	(Republic of Ireland) Paul Nagle					Ret	1	1	1	75
5	(Poland) Andrzej Obrebowski		6	2	3	4	4	Ret	Ret	65
6	(United Kingdom) Gareth Roberts	1	2	Ret						43
7	(United Kingdom) Daniel Barritt						5		4	22
8	(United Kingdom) Craig Parry						2			18
9	(Sweden) Göran Bergsten		3							15
10	(Portugal) Mário Castro			3						15
11	(Finland) Marko Salminen					3				15
12	(Germany) Detlef Ruf							4		12
13	(Finland) Janne Ferm					5				10
14	(Australia) William Hayes		7		Ret					6
—	(Italy) Mitia Dotta	Ret								0
—	(Norway) Veronica Engan		Ret							0
—	(Spain) Diego Vallejo								Ret	0
Pos.	Co-driver	MON (Monaco)	SWE (Sweden)	POR (Portugal)	NZL (New Zealand)	FIN (Finland)	GBR (United Kingdom)	FRA (France)	ESP (Spain)	Points

==== PWRC Drivers' championship ====
Pos.	Driver	MON (Monaco)	MEX (Mexico)	ARG (Argentina)	GRE (Greece)	NZL (New Zealand)	GER (Germany)	ITA (Italy)	ESP (Spain)	Points
1	(Mexico) Benito Guerra		1	1	4		2	8	1	109
2	(Argentina) Marcos Ligato			4	Ret	1	3	2	2	88
3	(Ukraine) Valeriy Gorban			3	1	4	7	3	4	85
4	(Poland) Michał Kościuszko	1	3	Ret			1	6	6	81
5	(Indonesia) Subhan Aksa			7	2	2	6	4	3	77
6	(Peru) Nicolás Fuchs	WD	2	2	Ret		5	1	9	73
7	(Mexico) Ricardo Triviño			Ret	3	3	4	7	8	52
8	(United Kingdom) Louise Cook	2			6	6	Ret	10	WD	35
9	(Italy) Gianluca Linari		4	5	Ret	5		9	10	35
10	(Italy) Lorenzo Bertelli	Ret		8	5	Ret		Ret	5	24
11	(Ukraine) Oleksiy Kikireshko			Ret	Ret	Ret	Ret	5	11	10
12	(Mexico) Rodrigo Salgado		5							10
13	(Sweden) Ramona Karlsson		6	Ret		Ret	Ret	WD	WD	8
14	(Argentina) Ezequiel Campos			6						8
15	(Spain) Yeray Lemes								7	6
NC	(Spain) Josep Maria Membrado								Ret	0
Pos.	Driver	MON (Monaco)	MEX (Mexico)	ARG (Argentina)	GRE (Greece)	NZL (New Zealand)	GER (Germany)	ITA (Italy)	ESP (Spain)	Points

Key
Colour	Result
Gold	Winner
Silver	2nd place
Bronze	3rd place
Green	Points finish
Blue	Non-points finish
Blue	Non-classified finish (NC)
Purple	Did not finish (Ret)
Black	Excluded (EX)
Black	Disqualified (DSQ)
White	Did not start (DNS)
White	Cancelled (C)
Blank	Withdrew entry from the event (WD)

===== Co-drivers =====
Pos.	Co-driver	MON (Monaco)	MEX (Mexico)	ARG (Argentina)	GRE (Greece)	NZL (New Zealand)	GER (Germany)	ITA (Italy)	ESP (Spain)	Points
1	(Spain) Borja Rozada		1	1	4		2	8	1	109
2	(Argentina) Rubén García			4	Ret	1	3	2	2	88
3	(Ukraine) Andriy Nikolaev			3	1	4	7	3	4	85
4	(Poland) Maciej Szczepaniak	1	3	Ret			1	6	6	81
5	(Argentina) Fernando Mussano	WD	2	2	Ret		5	1	9	73
6	(Spain) Alex Haro			Ret	3	3	4	7	8	52
7	(New Zealand) Jeff Judd				2	2	6			44
8	(United Kingdom) Stefan Davis	2			6	6	Ret	10	WD	35
9	(Italy) Andrea Cecchi				Ret	5		9	10	35
10	(Italy) Nicola Arena		4	5				4		34
11	(Italy) Lorenzo Granai	Ret		8	5	Ret		Ret	5	24
11	(Australia) William Hayes								3	15
13	(Estonia) Sergey Larens						Ret	5	11	10
14	(Mexico) Diodoro Salgado		5							10
15	(Sweden) Miriam Walfridsson		6	Ret	Ret	Ret	Ret	WD	WD	8
16	(Argentina) Cristian Winkler			6						8
17	(Indonesia) Hade Mboi			7						6
18	(Spain) Rogelio Peñate								7	6
NC	(Ukraine) Pavlo Cherepin			Ret	Ret	Ret				0
NC	(Italy) Monica Fortunato				Ret					0
NC	(Spain) Josep Ramón Ribolleda								Ret	0
Pos.	Co-driver	MON (Monaco)	MEX (Mexico)	ARG (Argentina)	GRE (Greece)	NZL (New Zealand)	GER (Germany)	ITA (Italy)	ESP (Spain)	Points

==== WRC Academy Drivers' championship ====
Pos.	Driver	POR (Portugal)	GRE (Greece)	FIN (Finland)	GER (Germany)	FRA (France)	ESP (Spain)	Points
1	(United Kingdom) Elfyn Evans	7	1 ^{7}	1 ^{7}	1 ^{3}	1 ^{3}	3 ^{3}	144
2	(Spain) José Antonio Suárez	5	5 ^{1}	4 ^{1}	2	2 ^{4}	1 ^{1}	100
3	(Sweden) Pontus Tidemand	3 ^{1}	Ret ^{1}	2 ^{6}	6	6 ^{2}	2 ^{7}	84
4	(Australia) Brendan Reeves	2 ^{2}	3	3 ^{2}	5 ^{1}	4 ^{1}	6	84
5	(United Kingdom) John MacCrone	9	4 ^{1}	5	3 ^{2}	3 ^{2}	4 ^{2}	73
6	(United Kingdom) Alastair Fisher	1 ^{3}	2	9 ^{1}	Ret ^{4}	Ret ^{1}		54
7	(Netherlands) Timo van der Marel	4	7	Ret	4 ^{1}	7	5	47
8	(Sweden) Fredrik Åhlin	6 ^{3}	Ret	Ret	Ret	5 ^{1}	Ret	22
9	(United States) Christopher Duplessis	Ret	6	6				16
10	(Portugal) João Silva	8	Ret	7	DNS			10
11	(South Africa) Ashley Haigh-Smith	WD	Ret	8	DNS	WD		4
Pos.	Driver	POR (Portugal)	GRE (Greece)	FIN (Finland)	GER (Germany)	FRA (France)	ESP (Spain)	Points

Key
Colour	Result
Gold	Winner
Silver	2nd place
Bronze	3rd place
Green	Points finish
Blue	Non-points finish
Blue	Non-classified finish (NC)
Purple	Did not finish (Ret)
Black	Excluded (EX)
Black	Disqualified (DSQ)
White	Did not start (DNS)
White	Cancelled (C)
Blank	Withdrew entry from the event (WD)

Notes:

- ^{1} refers to the number of stages won, where a bonus point is awarded per stage win.

===== Co-drivers =====
Pos.	Co-driver	POR (Portugal)	GRE (Greece)	FIN (Finland)	GER (Germany)	FRA (France)	ESP (Spain)	Points
1	(United Kingdom) Phil Pugh		1 ^{7}	1 ^{7}	1 ^{3}	1 ^{3}		120
2	(Spain) Cándido Carrera	5	5 ^{1}	4 ^{1}	2	2 ^{4}	1 ^{1}	100
3	(Norway) Stig Rune Skjærmoen	3 ^{1}	Ret ^{1}	2 ^{6}		6 ^{2}	2 ^{7}	76
4	(Australia) Rhianon Smyth	2 ^{2}	3	3 ^{2}	5 ^{1}	4 ^{1}	6	84
5	(United Kingdom) Stuart Loudon	9	4 ^{1}	5	3 ^{2}	3 ^{2}	4 ^{2}	73
6	(United Kingdom) Daniel Barritt	1 ^{3}	2	9 ^{1}	Ret ^{4}	Ret ^{1}		54
7	(Netherlands) Erwin Berkhof	4	7	Ret	4 ^{1}	7	5	47
8	(Norway) Morten Erik Abrahamsen	6 ^{3}	Ret	Ret	Ret	5 ^{1}	Ret	22
9	(United Kingdom) Sebastian Marshall						3 ^{3}	18
10	(Republic of Ireland) Karl Atkinson	Ret	6					8
11	(United States) Alexander Kihurani			6				8
12	(Sweden) Emil Axelsson				6			8
13	(United Kingdom) Andrew Edwards	7						6
14	(Portugal) Hugo Magalhães		Ret	7	DNS			6
15	(Portugal) José Janela	8						4
16	(United Kingdom) Craig Parry	WD	Ret	8	DNS	WD		4
Pos.	Co-driver	POR (Portugal)	GRE (Greece)	FIN (Finland)	GER (Germany)	FRA (France)	ESP (Spain)	Points

== Changes ==
- In November 2011, Europol issued an arrest warrant for Russian banker Vladimir Antonov at the request of Lithuanian prosecutors as part of an investigation into asset-stripping at Antonov's commercial banks, Snoras and Latvijas Krājbanka. Antonov, who held the commercial rights to the sport through Convers Sports Initiatives, was arrested in London two days later and charged with fraud and embezzlement. Convers Sports Initiatives initially claimed to be unaffected by the arrest, but went into receivership at the end of the month. Promoter North One Sport issued a statement clarifying the situation, confirming that they were unaffected by Antonov's arrest and parent company Convers Sports Initiatives entering into receivership and that they would co-operate with the investigation into Bank Snoras. However, North One Sport were subsequently forced to find new investors, with bids from Qatar and French broadcaster Eurosport. It was later reported that negotiations with the Qatari bidders had collapsed, forcing the closure of North One Sport.
- The FIA World Motor Sport Council permitted tyre suppliers to provide teams and drivers with a second tyre compound, following several complaints from drivers about a lack of grip at the 2011 Rally Australia.
- On gravel rallies, shakedown stage will be used as a qualifying stage for P1 and P2 drivers. According to the results of qualifying, P1 and P2 crews – in order of fastest to slowest – will then select their start positions for the first day of the rally. On day two and three, P1 and P2 drivers will restart in reverse order according to their provisional overall classification. On asphalt rallies, regulations in previous years still apply.
- Organisers of WRC events will be allowed to specify whether cars failed to complete a section are permitted to restart the event on the next day. Restart after retirement, formerly known as SupeRally, will now be called "Rally 2".
