= Luca Pedersoli =

Italian rally driver (born 1971)

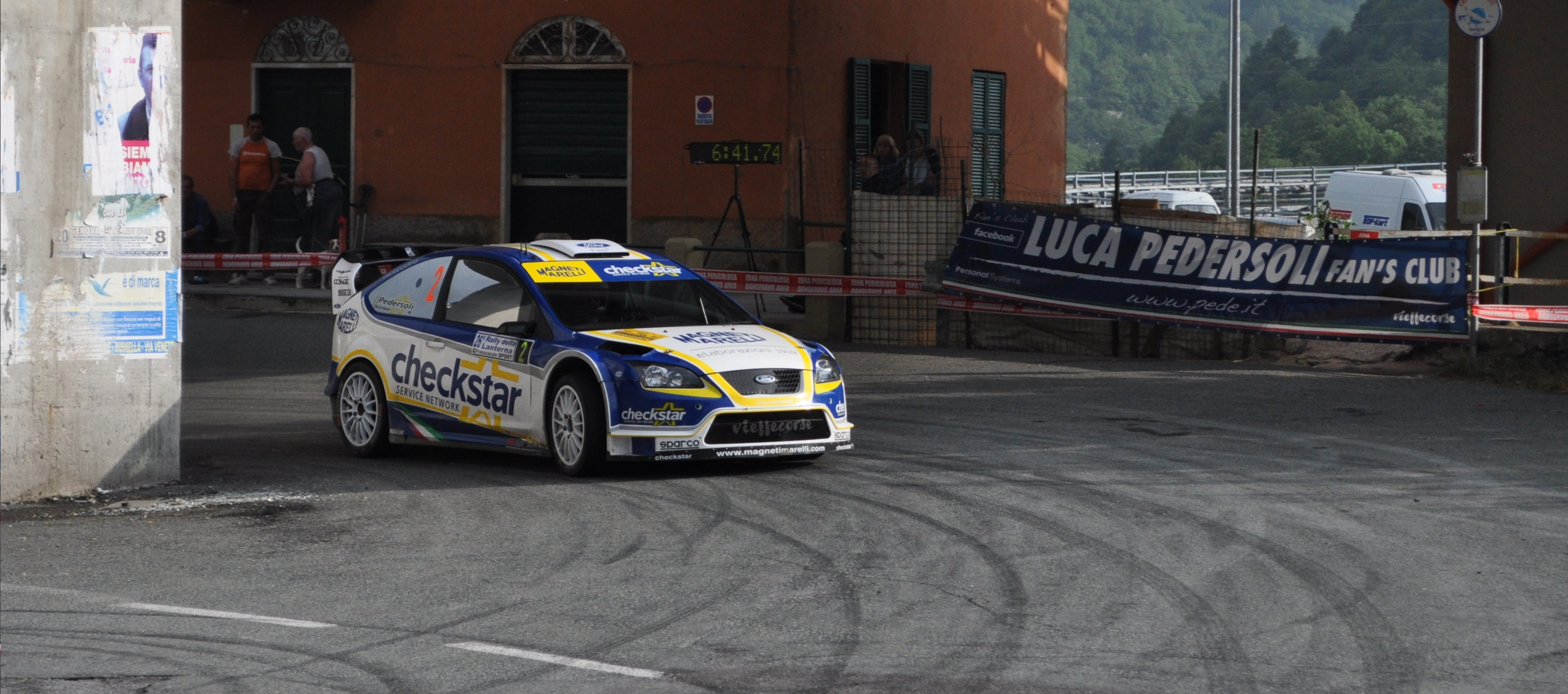
- Pedersoli during the 2010 Rally della Lanterna

Personal information
- Nationality: (Italy) Italian
- Born: 16 March 1971 (age 55); Gavardo

World Rally Championship record
- Years active: 1998–2000, 2012
- Co-driver: (Italy) Matteo Romano
- Rallies: 6
- Championships: 0
- Rally wins: 0
- Podiums: 0
- Stage wins: 0
- Total points: 1
- First rally: 1998 Monte Carlo Rally
- Last updated on: 26 December 2012.

Luca Pedersoli (born 16 March 1971 in Gavardo) is an Italian rally driver. He scored a World Rally Championship (WRC) point when he finished in tenth place on the 2012 Rally d'Italia Sardegna.

Pedersoli competed in enduro motorcycling, winning four regional championships and one national championship between 1989 and 1995. He began rallying in 1996, making his WRC debut on the Monte Carlo Rally in 1998 in a Fiat Cinquecento. He also competed on his home round - Rallye Sanremo - later that year, this time in a Renault Mégane. In 1999 he entered Monte Carlo in a Toyota Celica GT-Four, finishing 11th overall, while in 2000 he campaigned a Fiat Punto Kit Car on the Tour de Corse and in Sanremo.

In 2004, Pedersoli finished runner-up in the FIA European Rally Championship to Simon Jean-Joseph, driving a Peugeot 306. He then stayed away from rallying until 2009, finishing third in the Italian Asphalt Rally Championship behind the wheel of a Peugeot 206 WRC, winning the category the following year with a Ford Focus RS WRC and again in 2011 with a Citroën C4 WRC.

In 2012, Pedersoli made a successful return to the WRC on the Rally d'Italia Sardegna, piloting a Citroën DS3 WRC to tenth overall and a maiden world championship point.

== Complete World Rally Championship results ==
| Year | Entrant | Car | 1 | 2 | 3 | 4 | 5 | 6 | 7 | 8 | 9 | 10 | 11 | 12 | 13 | 14 | WDC | Points |
|---|---|---|---|---|---|---|---|---|---|---|---|---|---|---|---|---|---|---|
| 1998 | Luca Pedersoli | Fiat Cinquecento Sporting | MON; 27 | SWE | KEN | POR | ESP | FRA | ARG | GRE | NZL | FIN | | | | | NC | 0 |
| 1998 | Luca Pedersoli | Renault Mégane Maxi | | | | | | | | | | | ITA; 21 | AUS | GBR | | NC | 0 |
| 1999 | Luca Pedersoli | Toyota Celica GT-Four | MON; 11 | SWE | KEN | POR | ESP | FRA | ARG | GRE | NZL | FIN | CHN | ITA | AUS | GBR | NC | 0 |
| 2000 | Luca Pedersoli | Fiat Punto Kit Car | MON | SWE | KEN | POR | ESP | ARG | GRE | NZL | FIN | CYP | FRA; Ret | ITA; 29 | AUS | GBR | NC | 0 |
| 2012 | Luca Pedersoli | Citroën DS3 WRC | MON | SWE | MEX | POR | ARG | GRE | NZL | FIN | GER | GBR | FRA | ITA; 10 | ESP | | 36th | 1 |
