= Pedersoli =

Pedersoli is an Italian surname. Notable people with the surname include:

- Luca Pedersoli (born 1971), Italian rally driver
- Bud Spencer (born Carlo Pedersoli; 1929–2016), Italian actor, filmmaker and swimmer

== See also ==
- Davide Pedersoli, Italian firearms manufacturing company
