= Paulo Nobre =

Brazilian lawyer and rally driver (born 1968)

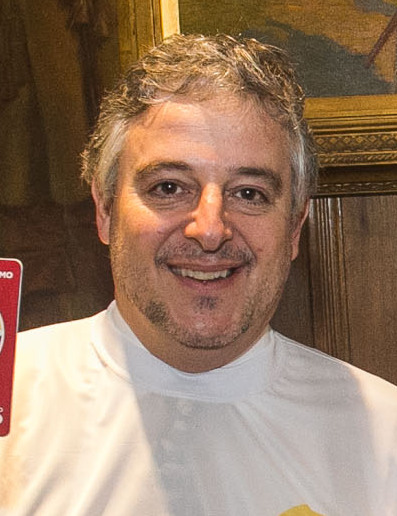
- Paulo Nobre in 2015

38th President of Palmeiras
- In office 21 January 2013 – 14 December 2016
- Vice President: Maurício Galiotte
- Preceded by: Arnaldo Tirone
- Succeeded by: Maurício Galiotte

Personal details
- Born: Paulo de Almeida Nobre; 24 February 1968 (age 58) São Paulo, São Paulo, Brazil
- Profession: Lawyer

Paulo de Almeida Nobre (born 24 February 1968) is a Brazilian lawyer, rally driver and former president of Sociedade Esportiva Palmeiras.

== Palmeiras ==
=== Election ===
Paulo Nobre had the support of former Presidents Mustafa Contursi and Carlos Bernardo Facchina Nunes to be elected president of Palmeiras. He had a major campaign promise, "management shock" at Palmeiras for the traditional club of Brazilian football. Which was for the administration to be more modern and less troubled than the years before his election.

On November 29, 2014, Nobre was re-elected after winning the opposition Wlademir Pescarmona, the first president in the history of Palmeiras to be elected directly

=== Projects as a President ===
One of the main Nobre goals is to transform the Palmeiras marketing. Therefore, in addition, the new president wants to professionalize the football department of the club by hiring a gerentão. The name hired for this function is that of José Carlos Brunoro, which in the mid 1990 successfully passed for Palmeiras at the height of the partnership with the Italian multinational Parmalat, which was managing Audax from São Paulo. Thus, besides being able to hire better caliber reinforcements, Nobre intends to stop the heavy debt of around R$293 million. That way, he will enter the twenty-first century, a century in which, according to the president, the club has not yet entered.

=== Trophies won by club during presidency ===
- Campeonato Brasileiro Série A (1):
  - 2016
- Campeonato Brasileiro Série B (1):
  - 2013
- Copa do Brasil (1):
  - 2015

== Rally career ==
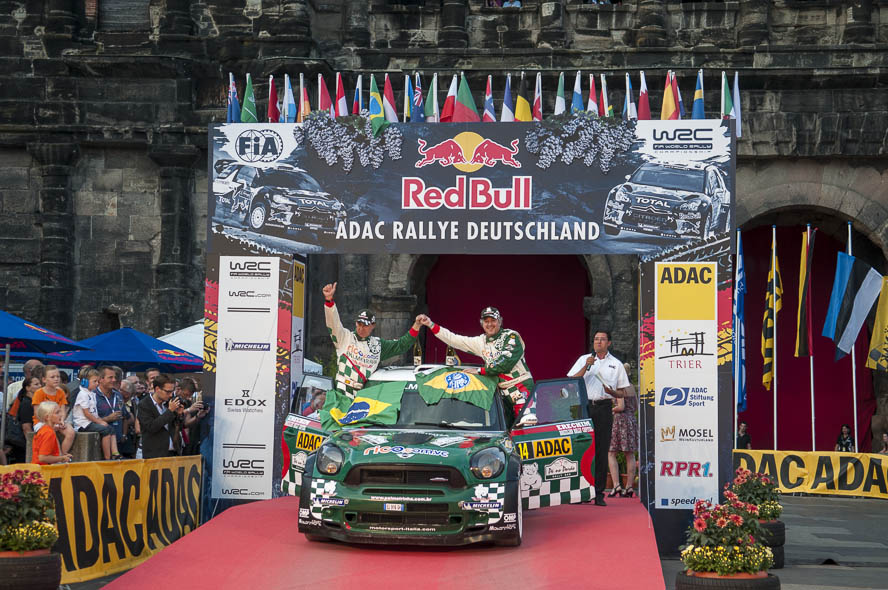
Rally Germany 2012

Nobre began rallying in 1999. In 2006, he contested the Dakar Rally for the first time, and also made his World Rally Championship debut on Rally Argentina. His next WRC appearance came on the 2009 Rally GB. The following season, he contested a full campaign in the Production World Rally Championship (P-WRC), in a Mitsubishi Lancer Evo X run by the Austrian team Baumschlager Rallye & Racing. He finished the season 15th in the points, with a best result of sixth in class on Rally New Zealand.

2011 saw a reduced programme for Nobre, contesting just four WRC rounds. The fourth and final of these saw him make his World Rally Car debut behind the wheel of a Mini John Cooper Works WRC on Wales Rally GB. He finished 29th overall. For 2012, Nobre committed to a full WRC programme in the Mini, run by Motorsport Italia and entered in the manufacturers' championship as a WRC Team under the name Palmeirinha Rally. After he finished 20th on the season opener in Monte Carlo, Nobre was brought together with the other Motorsport Italia-run car of Armindo Araujo under the new manufacturer entry of WRC Team Mini Portugal for the remainder of the 2012 season, following a change of direction by Mini.

Nobre also competed nationally at the Brazilian rally championship and raced at the biggest event of the genre in Brazil, the Rally de Erechim on multiple occasions.
