= Andrea Cecchi =

Italian swimmer (born 1968)

Personal information
- Born: 23 March 1968 (age 58) Casale Monferrato, Italy

Sport
- Sport: Swimming

Andrea Cecchi (born 23 March 1968) is an Italian former swimmer. He competed in two events at the 1992 Summer Olympics.
