= 2012 Rally Italia Sardegna =

Round of the world rally championship

2012 Rally Italia Sardegna Rally Italia Sardegna 2012
Round 12 of the 2012 World Rally Championship
← Previous event	Next event →
- Host country: Italy
- Rally base: Olbia, Sardinia
- Dates run: 18 – 21 October 2012
- Stages: 16 (306.04 km; 190.16 miles)
- Stage surface: Gravel
- Overall distance: 1,241.45 km (771.40 miles)

The 2012 Rally Italia Sardegna was the penultimate round of the 2012 World Rally Championship season and was held between 18 and 21 October 2012. It was based in Olbia, Sardegna.

The rally was also the seventh round of the Production World Rally Championship.

== Results ==
=== Event standings ===
Pos.	Driver	Co-driver	Car	Time	Difference	Points
Overall
1.	(Finland) Mikko Hirvonen	(Finland) Jarmo Lehtinen	Citroën DS3 WRC	3:23:54.9	0.0	25
2.	(Russia) Evgeny Novikov	(Austria) Ilka Minor	Ford Fiesta RS WRC	3:25:15.5	1:20.6	18
3.	(Estonia) Ott Tänak	(Estonia) Kuldar Sikk	Ford Fiesta RS WRC	3:26:16.0	2:21.1	15
4.	(Norway) Mads Østberg	(Sweden) Jonas Andersson	Ford Fiesta RS WRC	3:27:37.8	3:42.9	12
5.	(France) Sébastien Ogier	(France) Julien Ingrassia	Škoda Fabia S2000	3:28:22.4	4:27.5	10
6.	(Australia) Chris Atkinson	(Belgium) Stéphane Prévot	Mini John Cooper Works WRC	3:29:17.1	5:22.2	8
7.	(Norway) Andreas Mikkelsen	(Norway) Ola Fløene	Škoda Fabia S2000	3:30:07.4	6:12.5	6
8.	(Czech Republic) Martin Prokop	(Czech Republic) Zdeněk Hrůza	Ford Fiesta RS WRC	3:33:24.2	9:29.3	4
9.	(Norway) Petter Solberg	(United Kingdom) Chris Patterson	Ford Fiesta RS WRC	3:33:47.2	9:52.3	5
10.	(Italy) Luca Pedersoli	(Italy) Matteo Romano	Citroen DS3 WRC	3:44:30.5	20:35.6	1
PWRC
1. (14.)	(Peru) Nicolás Fuchs	(Argentina) Fernando Mussano	Subaru Impreza WRX STi	3:49:25.7	0.0	25
2. (15.)	(Argentina) Marcos Ligato	(Argentina) Rubén García	Subaru Impreza WRX STi	3:49:56.1	30.4	18
3. (16.)	(Ukraine) Valeriy Gorban	(Ukraine) Andriy Nikolaev	Mitsubishi Lancer Evo IX	3:50:07.8	42.1	15
4. (17.)	(Indonesia) Subhan Aksa	(Italy) Nicola Arena	Mitsubishi Lancer Evo X	3:52:26.9	3:01.2	12
5. (20.)	(Ukraine) Oleksiy Kikireshko	(Estonia) Sergei Larens	Mitsubishi Lancer Evo IX	3:56:28.4	7:02.7	10
6. (21.)	(Poland) Michał Kościuszko	(Poland) Maciej Szczepaniak	Mitsubishi Lancer Evo X	3:56:38.9	7:13.2	8
7. (22.)	(Mexico) Ricardo Triviño	(Spain) Àlex Haro	Subaru Impreza WRX STi	3:57:44.0	8:18.3	6
8. (24.)	(Mexico) Benito Guerra	(Spain) Borja Rozada	Mitsubishi Lancer Evo X	4:00:12.7	10:47.0	4
9. (25.)	(Italy) Gianluca Linari	(Italy) Andrea Cecchi	Subaru Impreza WRX STi	4:03:35.8	14:10.1	2
10. (30.)	(United Kingdom) Louise Cook	(United Kingdom) Stefan Davis	Ford Fiesta ST	4:42:48.5	53:22.8	1

=== Special Stages ===
All dates and times are CEST (UTC+2).

Leg	Stage	Time	Name	Length	Winner	Time	Avg. spd.	Rally leader
Leg 1 (18 Oct)	SS1	16:13	Terranova 1	28.14 km	(France) Sébastien Loeb	19:09.4	88.08 km/h	(France) Sébastien Loeb
Leg 1 (18 Oct)	SS2	18:16	Terranova 2	28.14 km	(Finland) Mikko Hirvonen	18:49.4	89.41 km/h	(France) Sébastien Loeb
Leg 2 (19 Oct)	SS3	8:43	Monte Lerno 1	29.68 km	(Finland) Mikko Hirvonen	18:16.2	97.28 km/h	(Finland) Mikko Hirvonen
Leg 2 (19 Oct)	SS4	11:34	Castelsardo 1	14.00 km	(Finland) Mikko Hirvonen	10:45.9	78.01 km/h	(Finland) Mikko Hirvonen
Leg 2 (19 Oct)	SS5	12:24	Tergu-Osilo 1	14.88 km	(France) Sébastien Ogier	10:16.1	86.56 km/h	(Finland) Mikko Hirvonen
Leg 2 (19 Oct)	SS6	14:46	Castelsardo 2	14.00 km	(Russia) Evgeny Novikov	10:27.6	80.18 km/h	(Finland) Mikko Hirvonen
Leg 2 (19 Oct)	SS7	15:36	Tergu-Osilo 2	14.88 km	(Russia) Evgeny Novikov	9:41.8	92.04 km/h	(Finland) Mikko Hirvonen
Leg 2 (19 Oct)	SS8	17:50	Monte Lerno 2	29.68 km	(Finland) Mikko Hirvonen	18:32.8	90.23 km/h	(Finland) Mikko Hirvonen
Leg 3 (20 Oct)	SS9	9:28	Coiluna-Loelle 1	29.35 km	(Norway) Mads Østberg	17:39.4	99.44 km/h	(Finland) Mikko Hirvonen
Leg 3 (20 Oct)	SS10	10:35	Monte di Ala 1	14.49 km	(Russia) Evgeny Novikov	9:12.9	94.20 km/h	(Finland) Mikko Hirvonen
Leg 3 (20 Oct)	SS11	11:37	Monte Olia 1	14.12 km	(Norway) Mads Østberg	10:18.2	82.13 km/h	(Finland) Mikko Hirvonen
Leg 3 (20 Oct)	SS12	14:48	Coiluna-Loelle 2	29.35 km	(Norway) Mads Østberg	17:12.6	102.19 km/h	(Finland) Mikko Hirvonen
Leg 3 (20 Oct)	SS13	15:55	Monti di Ala 2	14.49 km	(Finland) Jari-Matti Latvala	8:57.4	97.04 km/h	(Finland) Mikko Hirvonen
Leg 3 (20 Oct)	SS14	16:57	Monte Olia 2	14.12 km	(Norway) Mads Østberg	10:02.6	84.21 km/h	(Finland) Mikko Hirvonen
Leg 4 (21 Oct)	SS15	9:20	Gallura 1	8.24 km	(Norway) Mads Østberg	6:25.0	77.05 km/h	(Finland) Mikko Hirvonen
Leg 4 (21 Oct)	SS16	11:00	Gallura (power stage)	8.24 km	(Norway) Petter Solberg	6:13.4	79.44 km/h	(Finland) Mikko Hirvonen

=== Power stage ===
The "Power stage" was a 8.24 km (5.12 mi) stage at the end of the rally.

Pos.	No.	Driver	Co-driver	Car	Class	Time	Difference	Avg. spd.	Points
1	4	(Norway) Petter Solberg	(United Kingdom) Chris Patterson	Ford Fiesta RS WRC	WRC	6:13.417	0.000	79.4 km/h	3
2	3	(Finland) Jari-Matti Latvala	(Finland) Miikka Anttila	Ford Fiesta RS WRC	WRC	6:13.637	0.220	79.4 km/h	2
3	7	(Belgium) Thierry Neuville	(Belgium) Nicolas Gilsoul	Citroën DS3 WRC	WRC	6:18.182	4.765	78.5 km/h	1
