= 2012 Acropolis Rally =

Motor rally competition

2012 Acropolis Rally 58º Acropolis Rally
Round 6 of the 2012 World Rally Championship season
← Previous event	Next event →
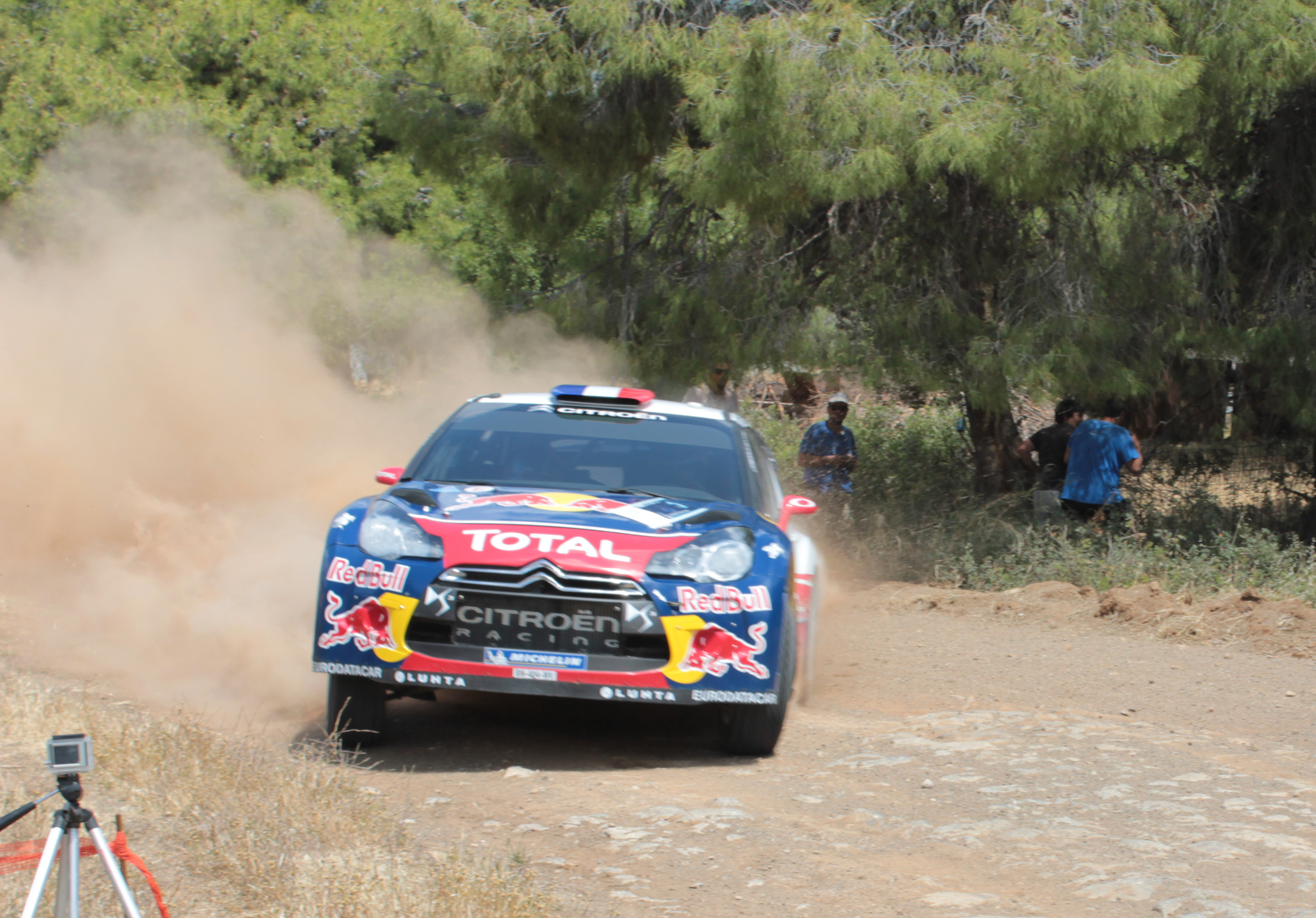
- Sébastien Loeb during Rally
- Host country: Greece
- Rally base: Loutraki, Corinthia, Greece
- Dates run: 24 – 27 May 2012
- Stages: 22 (409.47 km; 254.43 miles)
- Stage surface: Gravel
- Overall distance: 1,661.39 km (1,032.34 miles)

Statistics
- Crews: 54 at start, 32 at finish

Overall results
- Overall winner: (France) Sébastien Loeb (France) Citroën Total WRT

The 58th Acropolis Rally was the sixth round of 2012 FIA World Rally Championship. The event took place between 24 and 27 May 2012.

== Results ==
=== Event standings ===
Pos.	Driver	Co-driver	Car	Time	Difference	Points
Overall
1.	(France) Sébastien Loeb	(Monaco) Daniel Elena	Citroën DS3 WRC	4:42:03.3	0.0	28
2.	(Finland) Mikko Hirvonen	(Finland) Jarmo Lehtinen	Citroën DS3 WRC	4:42:43.3	40.0	19
3.	(Finland) Jari-Matti Latvala	(Finland) Miikka Anttila	Ford Fiesta RS WRC	4:45:08.1	3:04.8	17
4.	(Norway) Mads Østberg	(Sweden) Jonas Andersson	Ford Fiesta RS WRC	4:48:19.7	6:16.4	12
5.	(Czech Republic) Martin Prokop	(Czech Republic) Zdeněk Hrůza	Ford Fiesta RS WRC	4:49:49.8	7:46.5	10
6.	(Belgium) Thierry Neuville	(Belgium) Nicolas Gilsoul	Citroën DS3 WRC	4:51:44.7	9:41.4	8
7.	(France) Sébastien Ogier	(France) Julien Ingrassia	Škoda Fabia S2000	4:55:03.2	12:59.9	6
8.	(Saudi Arabia) Yazeed Al-Rajhi	(United Kingdom) Michael Orr	Ford Fiesta RRC	5:02:15.5	20:12.2	4
9.	(Estonia) Ott Tänak	(Estonia) Kuldar Sikk	Ford Fiesta RS WRC	5:05:22.2	23:18.9	2
10.	(Qatar) Abdulaziz Al-Kuwari	(Italy) Nicola Arena	Mini John Cooper Works WRC	5:10:43.8	28:40.5	1
PWRC
1. (14.)	(Ukraine) Valeriy Gorban	(Ukraine) Andriy Nikolaev	Mitsubishi Lancer Evo IX	5:22:57.6	0.0	25
2. (15.)	(Indonesia) Subhan Aksa	(New Zealand) Jeff Judd	Mitsubishi Lancer Evo X	5:26:15.1	3:17.5	18
3. (16.)	(Mexico) Ricardo Triviño	(Spain) Àlex Haro	Subaru Impreza WRX STi	5:30:01.9	7:04.3	15
4. (19.)	(Mexico) Benito Guerra	(Spain) Borja Rozada	Mitsubishi Lancer Evo X	5:51:14.3	28:16.7	12
5. (24.)	(Italy) Lorenzo Bertelli	(Italy) Lorenzo Granai	Subaru Impreza WRX STi	6:07:27.0	44:29.4	10
6. (29.)	(United Kingdom) Louise Cook	(United Kingdom) Stefan Davis	Ford Fiesta ST	6:39:02.2	1:16:04.6	8

=== Special stages ===
All dates and times are EEST (UTC+3).

Day	Stage	Time	Name	Length	Winner	Time	Avg. spd.	Rally leader
Leg 1 (24–25 May)	SS1	18:28	Kineta	25.24 km	(Finland) Jari-Matti Latvala	17:38.0	85.88 km/h	(Finland) Jari-Matti Latvala
Leg 1 (24–25 May)	SS2	6:53	Aghia Marina	13.80 km	(Finland) Jari-Matti Latvala	9:38.7	85.84 km/h	(Finland) Jari-Matti Latvala
Leg 1 (24–25 May)	SS3	8:31	Thiva 1	23.60 km	(Finland) Jari-Matti Latvala	16:06.3	87.92 km/h	(Finland) Jari-Matti Latvala
Leg 1 (24–25 May)	SS4	10:20	Elikonas 1	19.89 km	(Norway) Petter Solberg	14:05.9	84.64 km/h	(France) Sébastien Loeb
Leg 1 (24–25 May)	SS5	12:25	Bauxites 1	23.17 km	(Finland) Mikko Hirvonen	14:08.9	98.25 km/h	(France) Sébastien Loeb
Leg 1 (24–25 May)	SS6	13:19	Drossohori	22.00 km	(France) Sébastien Loeb	18:13.4	72.43 km/h	(France) Sébastien Loeb
Leg 1 (24–25 May)	SS7	15:22	Bauxites 2	23.17 km	(Finland) Jari-Matti Latvala	13:48.9	100.62 km/h	(France) Sébastien Loeb
Leg 1 (24–25 May)	SS8	17:05	Elikonas 2	19.89 km	(Norway) Petter Solberg	13:42.1	87.09 km/h	(France) Sébastien Loeb
Leg 1 (24–25 May)	SS9	18:50	Thiva 2	23.60 km	(Finland) Jari-Matti Latvala	16:20.3	86.67 km/h	(France) Sébastien Loeb
Leg 2 (26 May)	SS10	8:38	Klenia Mycenae 1	17.41 km	(France) Sébastien Loeb	11:24.2	91.60 km/h	(France) Sébastien Loeb
Leg 2 (26 May)	SS11	9:45	Ghymno 1	17.61 km	(Finland) Jari-Matti Latvala	12:38.0	83.64 km/h	(France) Sébastien Loeb
Leg 2 (26 May)	SS12	10:40	Kefalari 1	18.40 km	(Finland) Jari-Matti Latvala	13:18.8	82.92 km/h	(France) Sébastien Loeb
Leg 2 (26 May)	SS13	12:06	Ziria 1	21.36 km	(France) Sébastien Loeb	13:02.9	98.22 km/h	(France) Sébastien Loeb
Leg 2 (26 May)	SS14	15:17	Klenia Mycenae 2	17.41 km	(France) Sébastien Loeb	11:15.8	92.74 km/h	(France) Sébastien Loeb
Leg 2 (26 May)	SS15	16:24	Ghymno 2	17.61 km	(Norway) Petter Solberg	12:36.7	83.77 km/h	(France) Sébastien Loeb
Leg 2 (26 May)	SS16	17:19	Kefalari 2	18.40 km	(Norway) Petter Solberg	14:07.7	78.14 km/h	(France) Sébastien Loeb
Leg 2 (26 May)	SS17	18:45	Ziria 2	21.36 km	(Norway) Petter Solberg	13:29.3	95.01 km/h	(France) Sébastien Loeb
Leg 3 (27 May)	SS18	9:14	Aghii Theodori 1	19.42 km	(Finland) Jari-Matti Latvala	12:42.0	91.75 km/h	(France) Sébastien Loeb
Leg 3 (27 May)	SS19	9:45	New Pissia 1	11.37 km	(France) Sébastien Loeb	8:13.7	82.91 km/h	(France) Sébastien Loeb
Leg 3 (27 May)	SS20	11:57	Aghii Theodori 2	19.42 km	(Finland) Jari-Matti Latvala	12:39.6	92.04 km/h	(France) Sébastien Loeb
Leg 3 (27 May)	SS21	12:28	New Pissia 2	11.37 km	(Finland) Jari-Matti Latvala	8:09.7	83.59 km/h	(France) Sébastien Loeb
Leg 3 (27 May)	SS22	14:11	New Loutraki (Power stage)	3.97 km	(France) Sébastien Loeb	2:21.8	100.8 km/h	(France) Sébastien Loeb

=== Power Stage ===
The "Power stage" was a 3.97 km (2.47 mi) stage at the end of the rally.

Pos	Driver	Time	Diff.	Avg. speed	Points
1	(France) Sébastien Loeb	2:21.8		100.8 km/h	3
2	(Finland) Jari-Matti Latvala	2:22.4	0.6	100.4 km/h	2
3	(Finland) Mikko Hirvonen	2:23.1	1.3	99.9 km/h	1
