= 2012 Wales Rally GB =

Rally car race

2012 Wales Rally GB 68th Wales Rally GB
Round 10 of the 2012 World Rally Championship
← Previous event	Next event →
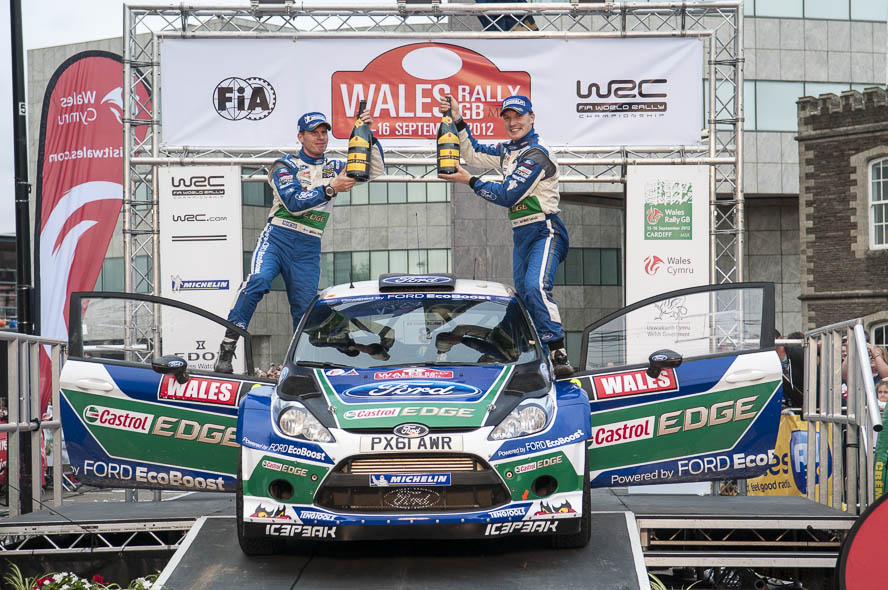
- Jari-Matti Latvala during Podium
- Host country: United Kingdom
- Rally base: Cardiff, Wales
- Dates run: 14 – 16 September 2012
- Stages: 19 (324.92 km; 201.90 miles)
- Stage surface: Gravel
- Overall distance: 1,604.05 km (996.71 miles)

Statistics
- Crews: 31 at start, 29 at finish

Overall results
- Overall winner: (Finland) Jari-Matti Latvala (United Kingdom) Ford World Rally Team

The 68th Wales Rally GB is the tenth round of the 2012 World Rally Championship season and is held between 14 and 16 September 2012.

The rally is also the sixth round of the Super 2000 World Rally Championship.

== Results ==
=== Event standings ===
Pos.	Driver	Co-driver	Car	Time	Difference	Points
Overall
1.	(Finland) Jari-Matti Latvala	(Finland) Miikka Anttila	Ford Fiesta RS WRC	3:03:40.3	0.000	26
2.	(France) Sébastien Loeb	(Monaco) Daniel Elena	Citroën DS3 WRC	3:04:08.1	27.8	20
3.	(Norway) Petter Solberg	(United Kingdom) Chris Pattersson	Ford Fiesta RS WRC	3:04:09.0	28.7	15
4.	(Norway) Mads Østberg	(Sweden) Jonas Andersson	Ford Fiesta RS WRC	3:04:50.9	1:10.6	12
5.	(Finland) Mikko Hirvonen	(Finland) Jarmo Lehtinen	Citroën DS3 WRC	3:05:09.8	1:29.5	13
6.	(Russia) Evgeny Novikov	(Austria) Ilka Minor	Ford Fiesta RS WRC	3:07:17.3	3:37.0	8
7.	(Belgium) Thierry Neuville	(Belgium) Nicolas Gilsoul	Citroën DS3 WRC	3:07:52.2	4:11.9	6
8.	(United Kingdom) Matthew Wilson	(United Kingdom) Scott Martin	Ford Fiesta RS WRC	3:09:40.7	6:00.4	4
9.	(Czech Republic) Martin Prokop	(Czech Republic) Zdeněk Hrůza	Ford Fiesta RS WRC	3:10.39.2	6:58.9	2
10.	(Qatar) Nasser Al-Attiyah	(Italy) Giovanni Bernacchini	Citroën DS3 WRC	3:13:12.4	9:32.1	1
SWRC
1. (13.)	(Republic of Ireland) Craig Breen	(Republic of Ireland) Paul Nagle	Ford Fiesta S2000	3:18:22.9	0.000	25
2. (14.)	(United Kingdom) Tom Cave	(United Kingdom) Craig Parry	Proton Satria Neo S2000	3:21:00.7	2:37.8	18
3. (16.)	(Saudi Arabia) Yazeed Al-Rajhi	(United Kingdom) Michael Orr	Ford Fiesta RRC	3:22:53.7	4:30.8	15
4. (17.)	(Poland) Maciej Oleksowicz	(Poland) Andrzej Obrebowski	Ford Fiesta S2000	3:26.38.8	8:15.9	12
5. (23.)	(United Kingdom) Alastair Fischer	(United Kingdom) Daniel Barritt	Ford Fiesta S2000	3:37:14.4	18:51.5	10
6. (24.)	(Sweden) Per-Gunnar Andersson	(Sweden) Emil Axelsson	Proton Satria Neo S2000	3:37:51.1	19:28.2	8

=== Special Stages ===
All dates and times are BST (UTC+1).

Leg	Stage	Time	Name	Length (km)	Winner	Time	Avg. spd. (km/h)	Rally leader
Leg 1 (14 Sep)	SS1	8:13	Dyfnant 1	20.48	(Norway) Petter Solberg	11:53.5	103.33	(Norway) Petter Solberg
Leg 1 (14 Sep)	SS2	9:38	Hafren Sweet Lamb 1	24.87	(Norway) Petter Solberg	14:46.2	101.03	(Norway) Petter Solberg
Leg 1 (14 Sep)	SS3	10:19	Myherin 1	27.88	(Finland) Jari-Matti Latvala	15:55.1	105.09	(Finland) Jari-Matti Latvala
Leg 1 (14 Sep)	SS4	13:13	Dyfnant 2	20.48	(Finland) Jari-Matti Latvala	11:45.9	104.45	(Finland) Jari-Matti Latvala
Leg 1 (14 Sep)	SS5	14:38	Hafren Sweet Lamb 2	24.87	(Finland) Jari-Matti Latvala	14:44.9	101.18	(Finland) Jari-Matti Latvala
Leg 1 (14 Sep)	SS6	15:19	Myherin 2	27.88	(Finland) Jari-Matti Latvala	15:55.7	105.02	(Finland) Jari-Matti Latvala
Leg 2 (15 Sep)	SS7	9:02	Crychan 1	19.50	(Norway) Mads Østberg	10:38.1	110.01	(Finland) Jari-Matti Latvala
Leg 2 (15 Sep)	SS8	9:40	Epynt 1	8.31	(France) Sébastien Loeb	4:31.3	110.27	(Finland) Jari-Matti Latvala
Leg 2 (15 Sep)	SS9	10:06	Halfway 1	18.35	(Finland) Jari-Matti Latvala	10:33.7	104.24	(Finland) Jari-Matti Latvala
Leg 2 (15 Sep)	SS10	15:17	Crychan 2	19.50	(Norway) Petter Solberg	10:27.9	111.80	(Finland) Jari-Matti Latvala
Leg 2 (15 Sep)	SS11	15:55	Epynt 2	8.31	(Finland) Jari-Matti Latvala	4:28.5	111.42	(Finland) Jari-Matti Latvala
Leg 2 (15 Sep)	SS12	16:21	Halfway 2	18.35	(Norway) Petter Solberg	10:30.4	104.79	(Finland) Jari-Matti Latvala
Leg 2 (15 Sep)	SS13	18:30	Celtic Manor	3.04	(Finland) Jari-Matti Latvala	1:46.9	102.38	(Finland) Jari-Matti Latvala
Leg 3 (16 Sep)	SS14	7:18	Port Talbot 1	17.35	(France) Sébastien Loeb	9:15.9	112.21	(Finland) Jari-Matti Latvala
Leg 3 (16 Sep)	SS15	8:16	Rheola 1	8.87	(France) Sébastien Loeb	4:42.0	113.14	(Finland) Jari-Matti Latvala
Leg 3 (16 Sep)	SS16	8:34	Walters Arena 1	15.33	(Finland) Jari-Matti Latvala	8:49.3	104.15	(Finland) Jari-Matti Latvala
Leg 3 (16 Sep)	SS17	12:07	Port Talbot 2	17.35	(Norway) Petter Solberg	9:07.1	114.09	(Finland) Jari-Matti Latvala
Leg 3 (16 Sep)	SS18	13:05	Rheola 2	8.87	(France) Sébastien Loeb	4:40.1	114.01	(Finland) Jari-Matti Latvala
Leg 3 (16 Sep)	SS19	13:23	Walters Arena 2 (Power stage)	15.33	(Finland) Mikko Hirvonen	8:51.4	103.51	(Finland) Jari-Matti Latvala

=== Power stage ===
The Power stage was a 15.33 km stage run through The Walters Arena. The three fastest crews through this stage were awarded by drivers' championship points. Mikko Hirvonen was the fastest driver through the stage, earning three additional championship points. Sébastien Loeb was second, while Ford driver Jari-Matti Latvala finished third.

Pos.	No.	Driver	Co-driver	Car	Class	Time	Difference	Avg. spd.	Points
1	2	(Finland) Mikko Hirvonen	(Finland) Jarmo Lehtinen	Citroën DS3 WRC	WRC	8:51.4	0.000	103.51km/h	3
2	1	(France) Sébastien Loeb	(Monaco) Daniel Elena	Citroën DS3 WRC	WRC	8:52.6	1.2	103.37km/h	2
3	3	(Finland) Jari-Matti Latvala	(Finland) Miikka Anttila	Ford Fiesta RS WRC	WRC	8:52.9	1.5	103.33km/h	1

Previous event: 2012 Rallye Deutschland	FIA World Rally Championship, 2012 season	Next event: 2012 Rallye de France
Previous year: 2011 Wales Rally GB	Wales Rally GB	Next year: 2013 Wales Rally GB
