= 2012 Rally Sweden =

Car rally

2012 Rally Sweden 60th Uddeholm Swedish Rally
Round 2 of the 2012 World Rally Championship season
← Previous event	Next event →
- Host country: Sweden
- Rally base: Karlstad, Sweden
- Dates run: 9 February – 12 2012
- Stages: 24 (349.16 km; 216.96 miles)
- Stage surface: Snow- and Ice-covered gravel

Statistics
- Crews: 50 at start, 42 at finish

Overall results
- Overall winner: (Finland) Jari-Matti Latvala (United Kingdom) Ford World Rally Team

The 2012 Rally Sweden, officially 60th Uddeholm Swedish Rally, was the second round of the 2012 World Rally Championship (WRC) season. The rally took place between 9 and 12 February 2012.

== Results ==
=== Event standings ===
Pos.	Driver	Co-driver	Car	Time	Difference	Points
Overall
1.	(Finland) Jari-Matti Latvala	(Finland) Miikka Anttila	Ford Fiesta RS WRC	3:18:28.3	0.0	26
2.	(Finland) Mikko Hirvonen	(Finland) Jarmo Lehtinen	Citroën DS3 WRC	3:18:44.9	+16.6	18
3.	(Norway) Mads Østberg	(Sweden) Jonas Andersson	Ford Fiesta RS WRC	3:19:07.1	+38.8	15
4.	(Norway) Petter Solberg	(United Kingdom) Chris Patterson	Ford Fiesta RS WRC	3:19:42.6	+1:14.3	14
5.	(Russia) Evgeny Novikov	(France) Denis Giraudet	Ford Fiesta RS WRC	3:21:09.7	+2:41.4	10
6.	(France) Sébastien Loeb	(Monaco) Daniel Elena	Citroën DS3 WRC	3:21:23.4	+2:55.1	11
7.	(Norway) Henning Solberg	(Austria) Ilka Minor	Ford Fiesta RS WRC	3:22:17.8	+3:49.5	6
8.	(Sweden) Patrik Sandell	(Sweden) Staffan Parmander	Mini John Cooper Works WRC	3:23:37.2	+5:08.9	4
9.	(Czech Republic) Martin Prokop	(Czech Republic) Zdeněk Hrůza	Ford Fiesta RS WRC	3:23:58.3	+5:30.0	2
10.	(Norway) Eyvind Brynildsen	(Norway) Cato Menkerud	Ford Fiesta RS WRC	3:24:55.5	+6:27.2	1
11.	(France) Sébastien Ogier	(France) Julien Ingrassia	Škoda Fabia S2000	3:26:03.3	0.0	-*
S2000 / SWRC
1. (11.)	(France) Sébastien Ogier	(France) Julien Ingrassia	Škoda Fabia S2000	3:26:03.3	0.0	-*
2. (13.)	(Norway) Andreas Mikkelsen	(Norway) Ola Fløene	Škoda Fabia S2000	3:28:46.8	+2:43.5	-*
3. (14.)	(Sweden) Per-Gunnar Andersson	(Sweden) Emil Axelsson	Proton Satria Neo S2000	3:30:16.8	+4:13.5	25
4. (16.)	(Republic of Ireland) Craig Breen	(United Kingdom) Gareth Roberts	Ford Fiesta S2000	3:31:52.6	+5:49.3	18
5. (18.)	(Sweden) Pontus Tidemand	(Norway) Jørgen Nordhagen	Škoda Fabia S2000	3:33:06.4	+7:02.1	15
6. (23.)	(New Zealand) Hayden Paddon	(New Zealand) John Kennard	Škoda Fabia S2000	3:39:26.9	+13:23.6	12
7. (24.)	(Saudi Arabia) Yazeed Al-Rajhi	(United Kingdom) Michael Orr	Ford Fiesta S2000	3:44:34.4	+18:31.1	10
8. (34.)	(Poland) Maciej Oleksowicz	(Poland) Andrzej Obrebowski	Ford Fiesta S2000	4:18:50.4	+52:47.1	8
9. (37.)	(United Kingdom) Alister McRae	(Australia) Bill Hayes	Proton Satria Neo S2000	4:31:02.1	+1:04:58.8	6

*These teams do not score points in the SWRC championship.

=== Special stages ===
Day	Stage	Time (UTC+1)	Name	Length	Winner	Time	Avg. spd.	Rally leader
Leg 1 (9–10 Feb)	SS1	20:04	SSS Karlstad 1	1.90 km	(Spain) Dani Sordo	1:34.2	72.61 km/h	(Spain) Dani Sordo
Leg 1 (9–10 Feb)	SS2	8:04	Mitandersfors	27.07 km	(Norway) Mads Østberg (Finland) Jari-Matti Latvala	14:13.0	115.60 km/h	(Norway) Mads Østberg
Leg 1 (9–10 Feb)	SS3	9:28	Opaker 1	20.17 km	(France) Sébastien Loeb	10:45.8	112.44 km/h	(Finland) Jari-Matti Latvala
Leg 1 (9–10 Feb)	SS4	10:03	Kirkener 1	7.10 km	(Finland) Mikko Hirvonen	5:41.0	74.96 km/h	(Finland) Jari-Matti Latvala
Leg 1 (9–10 Feb)	SS5	10:38	Finnskogen 1	20.97 km	(Finland) Mikko Hirvonen	11:57.2	105.25 km/h	(Finland) Mikko Hirvonen
Leg 1 (9–10 Feb)	SS6	12:48	Opaker 2	20.17 km	(France) Sébastien Loeb	10:30.1	115.24 km/h	(Finland) Mikko Hirvonen
Leg 1 (9–10 Feb)	SS7	13:23	Kirkener 2	7.10 km	(Finland) Mikko Hirvonen	5:34.9	76.32 km/h	(Finland) Mikko Hirvonen
Leg 1 (9–10 Feb)	SS8	13:58	Finnskogen 2	20.97 km	(Finland) Jari-Matti Latvala	11:48.3	106.58 km/h	(Finland) Jari-Matti Latvala
Leg 1 (9–10 Feb)	SS9	16:05	Torsby	19.21 km	(Norway) Petter Solberg	9:51.5	116.91 km/h	(Finland) Jari-Matti Latvala
Leg 1 (9–10 Feb)	SS10	19:20	SSS Karlstad 2	1.90 km	(Norway) Petter Solberg	1:32.6	73.87 km/h	(Finland) Jari-Matti Latvala
Leg 2 (11 Feb)	SS11	7:58	Vargåsen 1	24.63 km	(Finland) Jari-Matti Latvala	12:08.6	121.70 km/h	(Finland) Jari-Matti Latvala
Leg 2 (11 Feb)	SS12	9:46	Sågen 1	14.23 km	(Finland) Jari-Matti Latvala	7:32.4	113.24 km/h	(Finland) Jari-Matti Latvala
Leg 2 (11 Feb)	SS13	10:46	Fredriksberg 1	18.15 km	(Finland) Mikko Hirvonen	10:26.4	104.31 km/h	(Finland) Jari-Matti Latvala
Leg 2 (11 Feb)	SS14	12:03	Hagfors Sprint 1	1.87 km	(Estonia) Ott Tänak	1:52.3	59.95 km/h	(Finland) Jari-Matti Latvala
Leg 2 (11 Feb)	SS15	13:46	Vargåsen 2	24.63 km	(Finland) Jari-Matti Latvala	13:02.6	113.30 km/h	(Finland) Jari-Matti Latvala
Leg 2 (11 Feb)	SS16	15:34	Sågen 2	14.23 km	(Finland) Jari-Matti Latvala	7:22.8	115.69 km/h	(Finland) Jari-Matti Latvala
Leg 2 (11 Feb)	SS17	16:34	Fredriksberg 2	18.15 km	(Finland) Mikko Hirvonen	10:26.7	104.26 km/h	(Finland) Jari-Matti Latvala
Leg 2 (11 Feb)	SS18	17:51	Hagfors Sprint 2	1.87 km	(Estonia) Ott Tänak (France) Sébastien Loeb	1:58.0	57.05 km/h	(Finland) Jari-Matti Latvala
Leg 3 (12 Feb)	SS19	8:34	Lesjöfors 1	15.00 km	(Finland) Jari-Matti Latvala	9:10.3	98.13 km/h	(Finland) Jari-Matti Latvala
Leg 3 (12 Feb)	SS20	9:10	Rämmen 1	22.76 km	(Finland) Jari-Matti Latvala	11:47.1	115.88 km/h	(Finland) Jari-Matti Latvala
Leg 3 (12 Feb)	SS21	9:59	Hagfors 1	4.66 km	(Norway) Mads Østberg	3:05.2	90.58 km/h	(Finland) Jari-Matti Latvala
Leg 3 (12 Feb)	SS22	12:08	Lesjöfors 2	15.00 km	(Norway) Mads Østberg	9:00.8	99.85 km/h	(Finland) Jari-Matti Latvala
Leg 3 (12 Feb)	SS23	12:44	Rämmen 2	22.76 km	(Finland) Jari-Matti Latvala	11:40.7	116.93 km/h	(Finland) Jari-Matti Latvala
Leg 3 (12 Feb)	SS24	14:11	Hagfors 2 (Power stage)	4.66 km	(France) Sébastien Loeb	2:58.7	93.88 km/h	(Finland) Jari-Matti Latvala

=== Power Stage ===
The "Power stage" was a 4.66 km (2.90 mi) stage at the end of the rally, held near Hagfors.

Pos	Driver	Time	Diff.	Avg. speed	Points
1	(France) Sébastien Loeb	2:58.702	0.000	93.88 km/h	3
2	(Norway) Petter Solberg	3:03.688	+4.986	91.33 km/h	2
3	(Finland) Jari-Matti Latvala	3:04.406	+5.704	90.97 km/h	1
