= Emil Axelsson (co-driver) =

Swedish rally co-driver (born 1983)

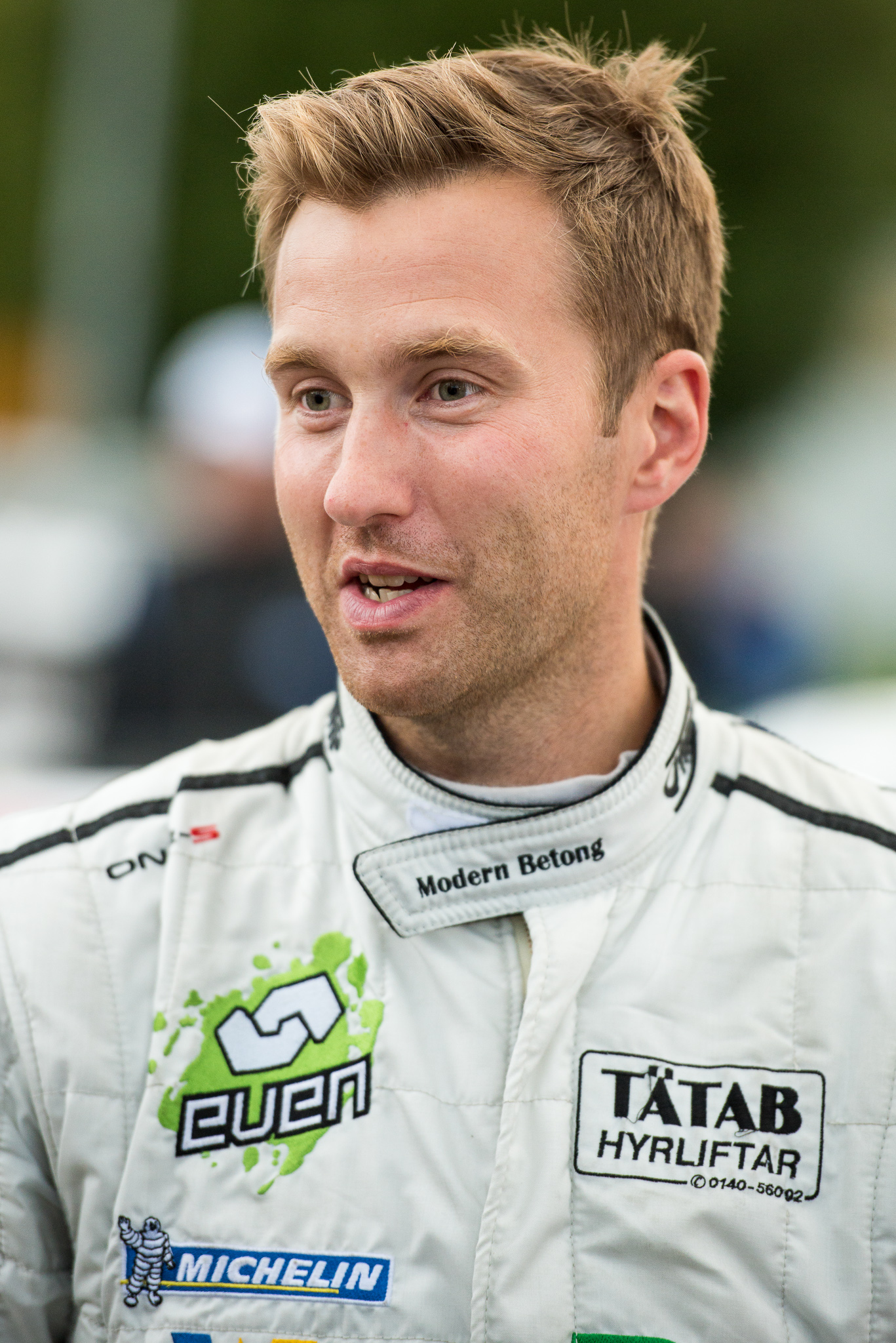
- Axelsson at the 2014 Rallye Deutschland

Personal information
- Nationality: (Sweden) Swedish
- Born: August 26, 1983 (age 43)

World Rally Championship record
- Years active: 2005–2015, 2017
- Driver: (Sweden) Patrik Sandell (Sweden) Per-Gunnar Andersson (Sweden) Pontus Tidemand (Norway) Henning Solberg (Norway) Mads Østberg
- Teams: M-Sport Ford WRT
- Rallies: 62
- Championships: 0
- Rally wins: 0
- Podiums: 0
- Stage wins: 5
- First rally: 2005 Rally Sweden
- Last rally: 2017 Wales Rally GB

Emil Axelsson (born 26 August 1983) is a Swedish rally co-driver.

== Rally career ==
Axelsson began his rally career in 2000, when he partnered with Simon Johansson in a Mazda 323.

Axelsson made his WRC at 2005 Rally Sweden, where he was the co-driver of the local star Patrik Sandell. In 2006, the Swedish crew won the J-WRC title in a Renault Clio S1600.

Axelsson firmed a partnership with Pontus Tidemand in 2014, but ended in 2015.

== Rally result ==
=== WRC results ===
Year	Entrant	Car	1	2	3	4	5	6	7	8	9	10	11	12	13	14	15	16	WDC	Points
2005	Patrik Sandell	Renault Clio Ragnotti	MON	SWE; Ret	MEX	NZL	ITA	CYP	TUR	GRE	ARG	FIN	GER	GBR	JPN	FRA	ESP	AUS	NC	0
2006	Patrik Sandell	Renault Clio S1600	MON	SWE; 20	MEX	ESP	FRA	ARG; 22	ITA; 15	GRE	GER	FIN; 34	JPN	CYP	TUR; 30	AUS	NZL	GBR; 33	NC	0
2007	Patrik Sandell	Renault Clio S1600	MON	SWE	NOR; 21	MEX	POR; 53	ARG	ITA; 31	GRE	FIN; 18	GER; EX	NZL	ESP; Ret	FRA	JPN	IRE	GBR	NC	0
2008	Peugeot Sport Sweden	Peugeot 207 S2000	MON	SWE; 11		ARG; Ret			GRE; Ret	TUR; 12		GER; 22				JPN	GBR; Ret		NC	0
2008	Peugeot Sport Sweden	Mitsubishi Lancer Evo IX											NZL; 11						NC	0
2008	Interspeed Racing Team	Renault Clio S1600			MEX; 13		JOR; Ret	ITA; 26			FIN; 21			ESP; 23					NC	0
2008	Interspeed Racing Team	Renault Clio R3													FRA; 28				NC	0
2009	Red Bull Rallye Team	Škoda Fabia S2000	IRE	NOR; 12	CYP; 9	POR; Ret	ARG	ITA; 10	GRE; 24	POL	FIN	AUS	ESP	GBR; 21					NC	0
2010	Red Bull Rallye Team	Škoda Fabia S2000	SWE; 15	MEX	JOR; 23	TUR	NZL; 12	POR	BUL	FIN; 11	GER; 10	JPN	FRA; 10	ESP	GBR; 14				23rd	2
2011	Per-Gunnar Andersson	Ford Fiesta RS WRC	SWE; 7	MEX	POR	JOR													20th	6
2011	M-Sport Stobart Ford World Rally Team	Ford Fiesta RS WRC					ITA; 15	ARG	GRE										20th	6
2011	Tommi Mäkinen Racing	Subaru Impreza STi R4								FIN; 15	GER	AUS	FRA	ESP	GBR				20th	6
2012	Proton Motorsport	Proton Satria Neo S2000	MON; Ret	SWE; 14	MEX	POR	ARG	GRE	NZL; 23	FIN; 11	GER	GBR; 24	FRA; 24	ITA	ESP; 8				24th	4
2013	Henning Solberg	Ford Fiesta RS WRC	MON	SWE; 8															18th	8
2013	Per-Gunnar Andersson	Ford Fiesta S2000			MEX	POR; Ret	ARG	GRE											18th	8
2013	AT Rally Team	Ford Fiesta RS WRC							ITA; 13	FIN; 8	GER; Ret	AUS	FRA	ESP	GBR				18th	8
2014	Pontus Tidemand	Ford Fiesta R5	MON	SWE	MEX	POR	ARG	ITA	POL	FIN	GER; 9	AUS	FRA	ESP	GBR				26th	2
2015	Pontus Tidemand	Ford Fiesta RRC	MON	SWE; 17	MEX	ARG													24th	4
2015	Škoda Motorsport	Škoda Fabia R5					POR; 13	ITA	POL; 13	FIN; 9	GER	AUS	FRA; Ret	ESP; 9	GBR; WD				24th	4
2017	M-Sport	Ford Fiesta WRC	MON	SWE	MEX	FRA	ARG	POR	ITA	POL	FIN	GER	ESP	GBR; 38	AUS				NC	0
