= Adapta World Rally Team =

2006-2012 World Rally Championship manufacturer team

Adapta WRT
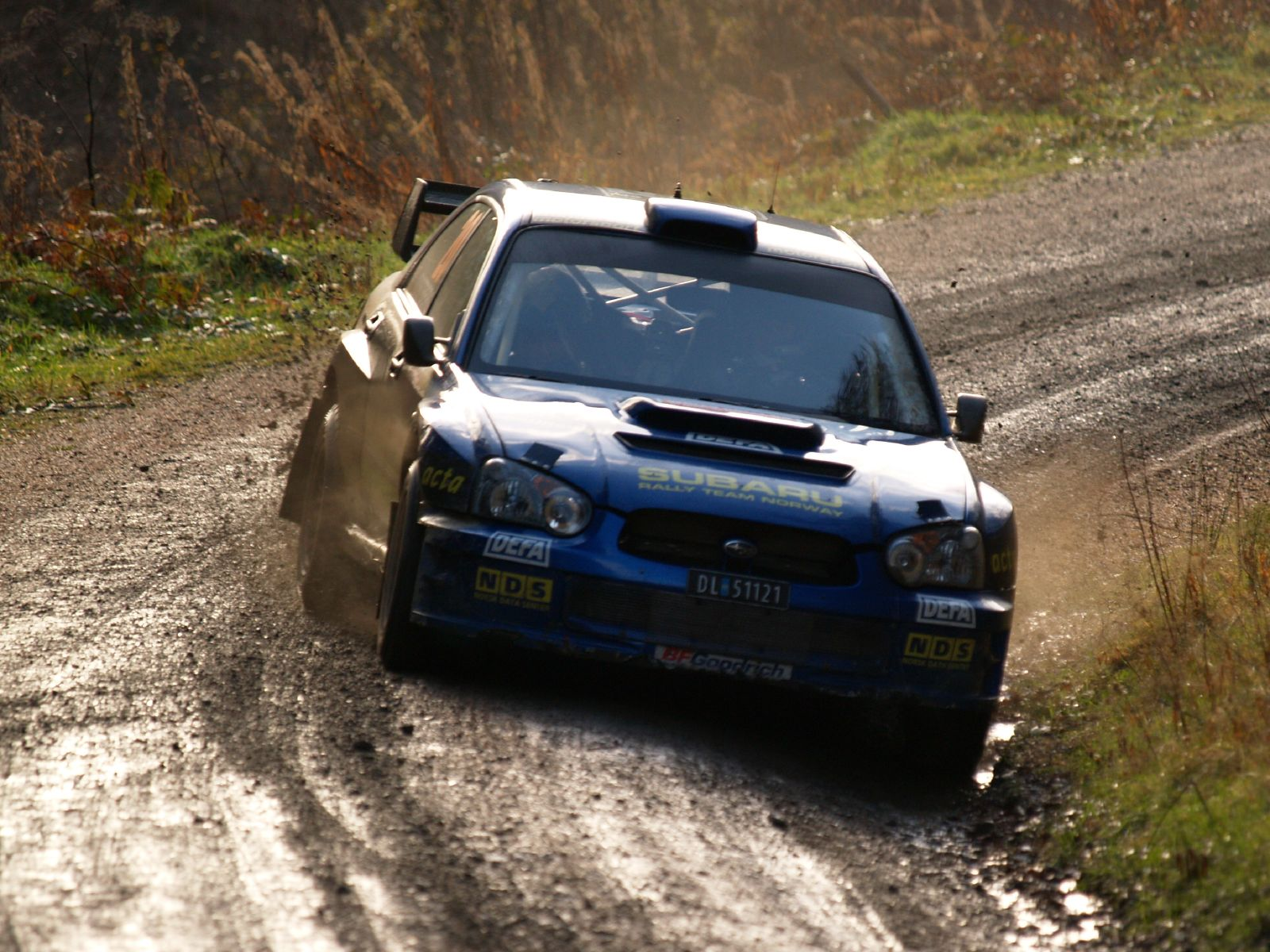
- Full name: Adapta World Rally Team
- Base: Oslo, Norway
- Team principal(s): Morten Østberg
- Drivers: (Norway) Mads Østberg (Norway) Eyvind Brynildsen
- Co-drivers: (Sweden) Jonas Andersson (Norway) Cato Menkerud
- Chassis: Ford Fiesta RS WRC
- Tyres: Michelin

World Rally Championship history
- Debut: 2006 Swedish Rally
- Last event: 2017 Wales Rally GB
- Manufacturers' Championships: 0
- Drivers' Championships: 0
- Rally wins: 1

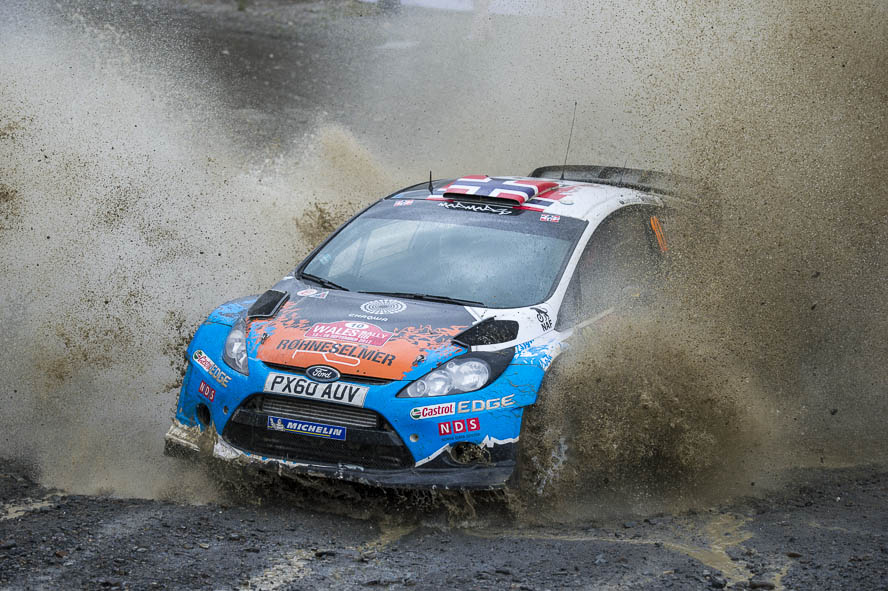
Østberg at the 2012 Wales Rally GB.

The Adapta WRT is a World Rally Championship team. Sometimes it is referred to as Adapta AS. It previously competed with various versions of the Subaru Impreza WRC and now they use Ford Fiesta RS WRC. Adapta WRT is signed to manufacturers championship with Mads Østberg and Eyvind Brynildsen for 2012 season.

== WRC Results ==
Year	Car	No	Driver	1	2	3	4	5	6	7	8	9	10	11	12	13	14	15	16	WDC	Points	TC	Points
2006	Subaru Impreza WRC 03	–	(Norway) Mads Østberg	MON	SWE; 31	MEX	ESP	FRA	ARG	ITA	GRE	GER	FIN; Ret	JPN	CYP	TUR	AUS	NZL	GBR; 23	–	0	–	–
2007	Subaru Impreza WRC 04	21	(Norway) Mads Østberg	MON	SWE; 9	NOR; 37	MEX	POR; Ret	ARG	ITA; Ret	GRE	FIN; 8	GER	NZL	ESP	FRA	JPN	IRE	GBR; 11	21st	1	–	–
2007	Subaru Impreza WRC 04	24	(Norway) Anders Grondal	MON	SWE	NOR; Ret	MEX	POR	ARG	ITA	GRE	FIN	GER	NZL	ESP	FRA	JPN	IRE	GBR	0	–	–	–
2008	Subaru Impreza WRC 07	18	(Norway) Mads Østberg	MON	SWE; 9	MEX	ARG	JOR	ITA; 11	GRE; 24	TUR	FIN; Ret	GER	NZL	ESP; 14	FRA; 9	JPN	GBR; Ret		–	0	–	–
2009	Subaru Impreza WRC2008	14	(Norway) Mads Østberg	IRE	NOR; 9	CYP	POR; 6	ARG	ITA; 7	GRE; 7	POL; Ret	FIN; Ret	AUS	ESP	GBR; Ret					11th	7	–	–
2009	Subaru Impreza WRC2008	20	(Norway) Anders Grondal	IRE	NOR; 14	CYP	POR	ARG	ITA	GRE	POL	FIN	AUS	ESP	GBR					–	0	–	–
2010	Subaru Impreza WRC2007	14	(Norway) Mads Østberg	SWE; 8	MEX	JOR	TUR	NZL			FIN; 7				ESP	GBR; 9				11th	18	–	–
2010	Subaru Impreza WRC2008	14	(Norway) Mads Østberg						POR; 7	BUL										11th	18	–	–
2012	Ford Fiesta RS WRC	15	(Norway) Mads Østberg	MON	SWE; 3	MEX; 4	POR; 1	ARG; 3	GRE; 4	NZL	FIN; 5	GER; 4	GBR; 4	FRA; 5	ITA; 4	ESP; 4				4th	149	4th	83
2012	Ford Fiesta RS WRC	64	(Norway) Eyvind Brynildsen	MON	SWE; 10	MEX	POR	ARG	GRE	NZL	FIN	GER	GBR	FRA	ITA	ESP				29th	1	4th	83
2017	Ford Fiesta WRC	14	(Norway) Mads Østberg	MON	SWE; 15	MEX	FRA	ARG; 9	POR; 8	ITA; 7	POL; 7	FIN; 10	GER	ESP; 5	GBR; 38	AUS				15th	29	–	–
