= Stuart Loudon =

British rally co-driver (born 1988)

- Nationality: (United Kingdom) British
- Born: April 11, 1988 (age 38) Uddingston, Scotland
- Relatives: Boyd Tunnock (Grandfather)
Stuart Loudon
World Rally Championship record
- Years active: 2011–2014, 2016–2018, 2021–2025
- Driver: (United Kingdom) John MacCrone (Japan) Ryozo Saito (Republic of Ireland) Robert Barrable (United Arab Emirates) Mohamed Al-Mutawaa (United Kingdom) Matthew Wilson (United Kingdom) Gus Greensmith (Kenya) McRae Kimathi (Australia) Luke Anear (Greece) Yorgo Philippedes (United Kingdom) Kris Meeke
- Teams: M-Sport Ford WRT
- Rallies: 27
- Championships: 0
- Rally wins: 0
- Podiums: 0
- Stage wins: 0
- First rally: 2011 Rallye Deutschland
- Last rally: 2025 Rally de Portugal

Stuart Loudon (born 11 April 1988 in Uddingston) is a British rally co-driver and engineer. He was a co-driver to Gus Greensmith at the 2021 Rally Italia Sardegna for M-Sport Ford.

== Personal life ==
Loudon was born in Uddingston. His grandfather is Boyd Tunnock, who owes Tunnock's. Loudon is also a qualified Rolls-Royce Aeronautical Engineer.

== Rally results ==
| Year | Entrant | Car | 1 | 2 | 3 | 4 | 5 | 6 | 7 | 8 | 9 | 10 | 11 | 12 | 13 | 14 | WDC | Points |
|---|---|---|---|---|---|---|---|---|---|---|---|---|---|---|---|---|---|---|
| 2011 | John MacCrone | Ford Fiesta R2 | SWE | MEX | POR | JOR | ITA | ARG | GRE | FIN | GER; Ret | AUS | FRA | ESP | GBR; 22 | | NC | 0 |
| 2012 | John MacCrone | Ford Fiesta R2 | MON | SWE | MEX | POR; NC | ARG | GRE; NC | NZL | FIN; NC | GER; NC | GBR | FRA; NC | ITA | ESP; NC | | NC | 0 |
| 2013 | Symtech Racing | Subaru Impreza STi | MON; 44 | SWE | MEX | | | | | | | | | | | | NC | 0 |
| 2013 | Robert Barrable | Ford Fiesta S2000 | | | | POR; 11 | ARG | GRE | ITA | | | | | | | | NC | 0 |
| 2013 | Robert Barrable | Ford Fiesta R5 | | | | | | | | FIN; 18 | GER; Ret | AUS | FRA; 26 | ESP; 15 | GBR; 21 | | NC | 0 |
| 2014 | Robert Barrable | Ford Fiesta R5 | MON; 13 | SWE | MEX | POR; 16 | ARG | ITA | POL | FIN | GER | AUS | FRA | ESP; 16 | GBR | | NC | 0 |
| 2016 | Abu Dhabi Racing Team | Citroën DS3 R3T Max | MON | SWE | MEX | ARG | POR | ITA | POL | FIN | GER | CHN; C | FRA; Ret | ESP | GBR | AUS | NC | 0 |
| 2017 | C-Rally | Ford Fiesta R5 | MON | SWE | MEX | FRA | ARG | POR | ITA | POL | FIN | GER | ESP | GBR; 39 | AUS | | NC | 0 |
| 2018 | Gus Greensmith | Ford Fiesta R5 | MON | SWE | MEX | FRA | ARG | POR | ITA | FIN | GER; Ret | TUR | GBR | ESP | AUS | | NC | 0 |
| 2021 | M-Sport Ford WRT | Ford Fiesta WRC | MON | ARC | CRO | POR | ITA; 26 | KEN | EST | BEL | GRE | FIN | ESP | MNZ | | | NC | 0 |
| 2022 | McRae Kimathi | Ford Fiesta Rally3 | MON | SWE | CRO | POR; 52 | ITA | KEN | EST | FIN | BEL | GRE | NZL | ESP | | | NC | 0 |
| 2022 | Luke Anear | Ford Fiesta Rally2 | | | | | | | | | | | | | JPN; 18 | | NC | 0 |
| 2023 | Yorgo Philippedes | Škoda Fabia Rally2 evo | MON | SWE | MEX | CRO | POR | ITA | KEN | EST | FIN | GRE; Ret | CHL | EUR | JPN | | NC | 0 |
| 2024 | Sports & You | Hyundai i20 N Rally2 | MON | SWE | KEN | CRO | POR; Ret | ITA | POL | LAT | FIN | GRE | CHL | EUR | JPN | | NC | 0 |
| 2025 | Kris Meeke | Toyota GR Yaris Rally2 | MON | SWE | KEN | ESP | POR; Ret | ITA | GRE | EST | FIN | PAR | CHL | EUR | JPN | SAU | NC | 0 |
