= 2012 Rally de Portugal =

Car rally

2012 Rally Portugal 46º Rally de Portugal
Round 4 of the 2012 World Rally Championship season
← Previous event	Next event →
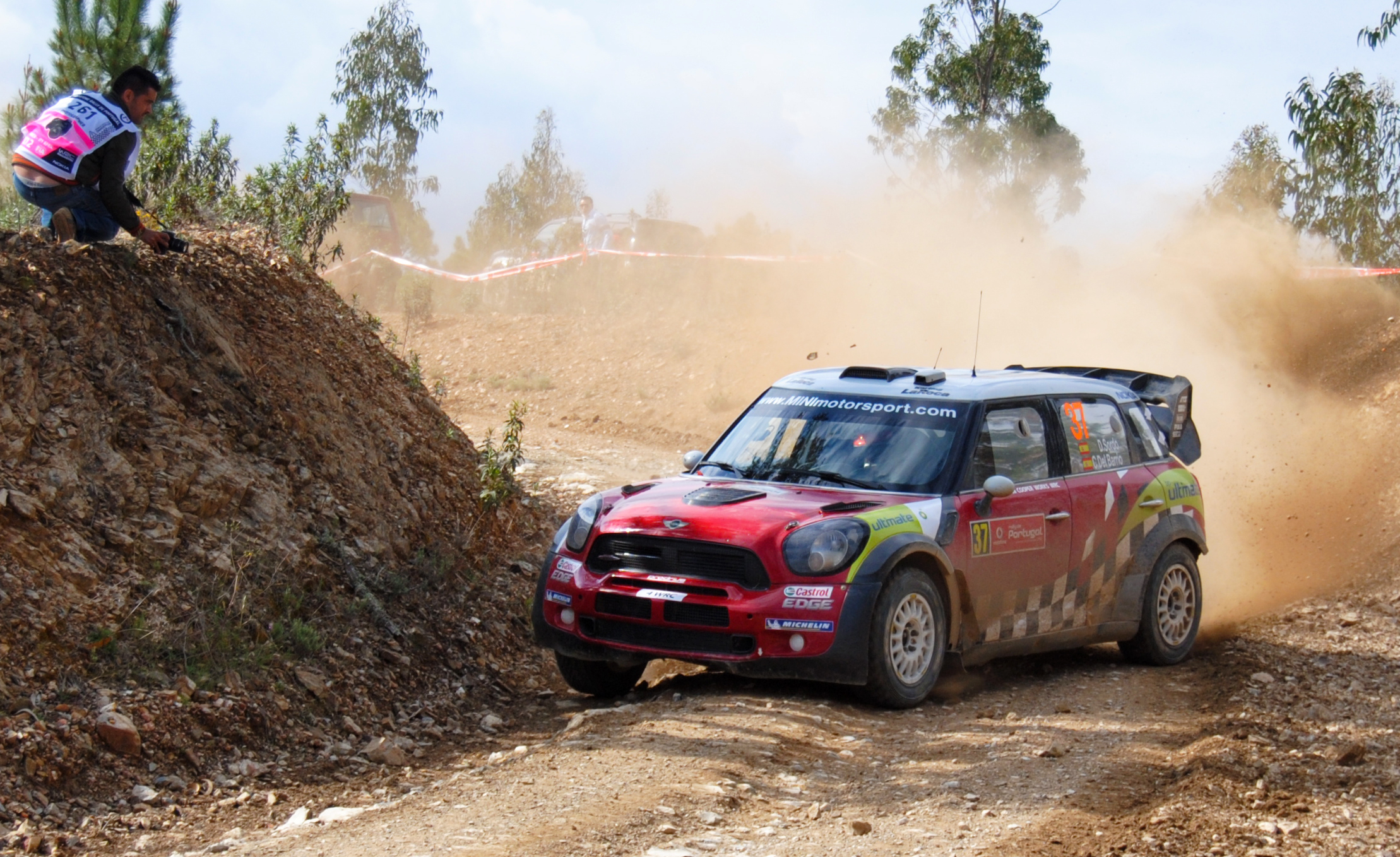
- Dani Sordo during Rally
- Host country: Portugal
- Rally base: Faro, Portugal
- Dates run: 29 March – 1 April 2012
- Stages: 22 (434.77 km; 270.15 miles)
- Stage surface: Gravel

Statistics
- Crews: 49 at start, 30 at finish

The 2012 Rally de Portugal was the fourth round of the 2012 World Rally Championship season and was based in Faro, Portugal. It started with a street stage in Lisbon on 29 March and concluded on 1 April after twenty-two special stages, totalling 434 competitive kilometres.

== Report ==
=== Before the rally ===
The rally was preceded by the "Fafe Rally Sprint", a single-stage exhibition event run over the famous Fafe stages in the country's north which was won by Ford World Rally Team driver Petter Solberg. Solberg's team-mate, Jari-Matti Latvala won the rally's qualifying stage on the Wednesday before the start of the rally. Latvala elected to run seventeenth on the road as a result; by contrast, Citroën Total World Rally Team drivers Mikko Hirvonen and Sébastien Loeb elected to run first and second respectively.

== Results ==
=== Event standings ===
Pos.	Driver	Co-driver	Car	Time	Difference	Points
Overall
1.	(Norway) Mads Østberg	(Sweden) Jonas Andersson	Ford Fiesta RS WRC	4:21:16.1	0.0	25
2.	(Russia) Evgeny Novikov	(France) Denis Giraudet	Ford Fiesta RS WRC	4:22:49.3	1:33.2	18
3.	(Norway) Petter Solberg	(United Kingdom) Chris Patterson	Ford Fiesta RS WRC	4:23:11.7	1:55.6	15
4.	(Qatar) Nasser Al-Attiyah	(Italy) Giovanni Bernacchini	Citroën DS3 WRC	4:27:21.9	6:05.8	12
5.	(Czech Republic) Martin Prokop	(Czech Republic) Zdeněk Hrůza	Ford Fiesta RS WRC	4:27:25.3	6:09.2	10
6.	(Netherlands) Dennis Kuipers	(Belgium) Robin Buysmans	Ford Fiesta RS WRC	4:28:03.4	6:47.3	8
7.	(France) Sébastien Ogier	(France) Julien Ingrassia	Škoda Fabia S2000	4:28:25.1	7:09.0	6
8.	(Belgium) Thierry Neuville	(Belgium) Nicolas Gilsoul	Citroën DS3 WRC	4:29:54.0	8:37.9	4
9.	(Finland) Jari Ketomaa	(Finland) Mika Stenberg	Ford Fiesta RS WRC	4:31:08.9	9:52.8	2
10.	(Netherlands) Peter van Merksteijn Jr.	(Belgium) Eddy Chevaillier	Citroën DS3 WRC	4:31:27.1	10:11.0	1
11.	(Spain) Dani Sordo	(Spain) Carlos del Barrio	Mini John Cooper Works WRC	4:33:39.8	12:23.7	3
13.	(Finland) Jari-Matti Latvala	(Finland) Miikka Anttila	Ford Fiesta RS WRC	4:38:18.7	17:02.6	2
14.	(Estonia) Ott Tänak	(Estonia) Kuldar Sikk	Ford Fiesta RS WRC	4:38:31.2	17:15.1	1
SWRC
1. (16.)	(New Zealand) Hayden Paddon	(New Zealand) John Kennard	Škoda Fabia S2000	4:49:41.2	0.0	25
2. (17.)	(Poland) Maciej Oleksowicz	(Poland) Andrzej Obrebowski	Ford Fiesta S2000	4:54:43.5	5:02.3	18
3. (18.)	(Portugal) Pedro Meireles	(Portugal) Mário Castro	Mitsubishi Lancer Evolution X R4	4:58:31.5	8:50.3	15
WRC Academy^{†}
1.	(United Kingdom) Alastair Fisher	(United Kingdom) Daniel Barritt	Ford Fiesta R2	2:32:02.9	0.0	28
2.	(Australia) Brendan Reeves	(Australia) Rhianon Smyth	Ford Fiesta R2	2:32:43.2	40.3	20
3.	(Sweden) Pontus Tidemand	(Norway) Stig Rune Skjærmoen	Ford Fiesta R2	2:34:08.6	2:05.7	16
4.	(Netherlands) Timo van der Marel	(Netherlands) Erwin Berkhof	Ford Fiesta R2	2:37:07.9	5:05.0	12
5.	(Spain) Jose Antonio Suarez	(Spain) Candido Carrera	Ford Fiesta R2	2:39:37.4	7:34.5	10
6.	(Sweden) Fredrik Ahlin	(Norway) Morten Erik Abrahamsen	Ford Fiesta R2	2:42:19.6	10:16.7	11
7.	(United Kingdom) Elfyn Evans	(United Kingdom) Andrew Edwards	Ford Fiesta R2	2:47:58.2	15:55.3	6
8.	(Portugal) João Silva	(Portugal) José Janela	Ford Fiesta R2	2:49:17.7	17:14.8	4
9.	(United Kingdom) John MacCrone	(United Kingdom) Stuart Loudon	Ford Fiesta R2	2:52:01.9	19:59.0	2

^† – The WRC Academy features only the first 13 stages of the rally.

=== Special stages ===
Day	Stage	Time (UTC+1)	Name	Length	Winner	Time	Avg. spd.	Rally leader
Leg 1 (29 Mar)	SS1	15:00	SSS Lisboa	3.27 km	(Norway) Petter Solberg	2:57.1	66.47 km/h	(Norway) Petter Solberg
Leg 1 (29 Mar)	SS2	20:19	Gomes Aires	10.19 km	(Norway) Petter Solberg	6:38.1	92.15 km/h	(Norway) Petter Solberg
Leg 1 (29 Mar)	SS3	20:49	Santa Clara	14.29 km	(Finland) Jari-Matti Latvala	8:34.4	100.01 km/h	(Finland) Jari-Matti Latvala
Leg 1 (29 Mar)	SS4	21:25	Ourique	11.10 km	(Estonia) Ott Tänak	6:45.5	98.55 km/h	(Finland) Jari-Matti Latvala
Leg 2 (30 Mar)	SS5	12:01	Tavira 1	25.01 km	(Spain) Dani Sordo	17:55.3	83.73 km/h	(Norway) Petter Solberg
Leg 2 (30 Mar)	SS6	12:36	Alcarias 1	25.15 km	(Spain) Dani Sordo	20:14.7	74.54 km/h	(Finland) Mikko Hirvonen^{1}
Leg 2 (30 Mar)	SS7	13:28	S. Brás de Alportel 1	16.18 km	(Spain) Dani Sordo	13:11.7	73.57 km/h	(Finland) Mikko Hirvonen^{1}
Leg 2 (30 Mar)	SS8	15:56	Tavira 2	25.01 km	stages cancelled due to poor weather			(Finland) Mikko Hirvonen^{1}
Leg 2 (30 Mar)	SS9	16:31	Alcarias 2	25.15 km	stages cancelled due to poor weather			(Finland) Mikko Hirvonen^{1}
Leg 2 (30 Mar)	SS10	17:23	S. Brás de Alportel 2	16.18 km	stages cancelled due to poor weather			(Finland) Mikko Hirvonen^{1}
Leg 3 (31 Mar)	SS11	09:49	Almodovar 1	26.22 km	(Spain) Dani Sordo	16:30.8	95.27 km/h	(Finland) Mikko Hirvonen^{1}
Leg 3 (31 Mar)	SS12	10:43	Vascao 1	25.29 km	(Norway) Petter Solberg	17:03.5	88.95 km/h	(Finland) Mikko Hirvonen^{1}
Leg 3 (31 Mar)	SS13	11:33	Loulé 1	22.57 km	(Norway) Petter Solberg	15:49.7	85.56 km/h	(Finland) Mikko Hirvonen^{1}
Leg 3 (31 Mar)	SS14	14:39	Almodovar 2	26.22 km	(Norway) Petter Solberg	16:06.9	97.62 km/h	(Finland) Mikko Hirvonen^{1}
Leg 3 (31 Mar)	SS15	15:33	Vascao 2	25.29 km	(Norway) Petter Solberg	16:16.5	93.24 km/h	(Finland) Mikko Hirvonen^{1}
Leg 3 (31 Mar)	SS16	16:23	Loulé 2	22.57 km	(Spain) Dani Sordo	15:25.0	87.84 km/h	(Finland) Mikko Hirvonen^{1}
Leg 4 (1 Apr)	SS17	07:59	Silves 1	21.42 km	(Finland) Jari-Matti Latvala	12:01.2	106.92 km/h	(Finland) Mikko Hirvonen^{1}
Leg 4 (1 Apr)	SS18	08:52	Santana de Serra 1	31.04 km	(Finland) Jari-Matti Latvala	22:48.0	81.68 km/h	(Finland) Mikko Hirvonen^{1}
Leg 4 (1 Apr)	SS19	09:42	Sambro 1	5.08 km	(Norway) Petter Solberg	3:09.2	96.66 km/h	(Finland) Mikko Hirvonen^{1}
Leg 4 (1 Apr)	SS20	12:23	Silves 2	21.42 km	(Norway) Petter Solberg	12:05.2	106.33 km/h	(Finland) Mikko Hirvonen^{1}
Leg 4 (1 Apr)	SS21	13:16	Santana de Serra 2	31.04 km	(Finland) Jari-Matti Latvala	22:54.1	81.32 km/h	(Finland) Mikko Hirvonen^{1}
Leg 4 (1 Apr)	SS22	14:10	Sambro 2 (Power stage)	5.08 km	(Spain) Dani Sordo	3:10.4	96.05 km/h	(Finland) Mikko Hirvonen^{1}

Notes:

- ^1 — Mikko Hirvonen won the rally, but was excluded when event scrutineers found that parts in his Citroën DS3 WRC did not match the parts listed by his team. Hirvonen's exclusion mean that Adapta World Rally Team driver Mads Østberg was declared the winner

=== Power Stage ===
The "Power stage" was a 5.08 km (3.16 mi) stage at the end of the rally.

Pos	Driver	Time	Diff.	Avg. speed	Points
1	(Spain) Dani Sordo	3:10.473	0.000	96.1 km/h	3
2	(Finland) Jari-Matti Latvala	3:10.747	+0.274	95.9 km/h	2
3	(Estonia) Ott Tänak	3:12.569	+2.096	95.0 km/h	1

== Championship standings after the event ==
=== Drivers' championship ===
Position	1st	2nd	3rd	4th	5th	6th	7th	8th	9th	10th
Points	25	18	15	12	10	8	6	4	2	1

Pos	Driver	MON (Monaco)	SWE (Sweden)	MEX (Mexico)	POR (Portugal)	ARG (Argentina)	GRE (Greece)	NZL (New Zealand)	FIN (Finland)	GER (Germany)	GBR (United Kingdom)	FRA (France)	ITA (Italy)	ESP (Spain)	Pts
1	(France) Sébastien Loeb	1 ^{1}	6 ^{1}	1 ^{2}	Ret										66
2	(Norway) Petter Solberg	3	4 ^{2}	3 ^{1}	3										62
3	(Norway) Mads Østberg		3	4 ^{3}	1										53
4	(Finland) Mikko Hirvonen	4 ^{2}	2	2	DSQ										50
5	(Russia) Evgeny Novikov	5 ^{3}	5	Ret	2										39
6	(Finland) Jari-Matti Latvala	Ret	1 ^{3}	Ret	13 ^{2}										28
7	(Spain) Dani Sordo	2	Ret		11 ^{1}										21
8	(Qatar) Nasser Al-Attiyah		21	6	4										20
9	(Estonia) Ott Tänak	8	Ret	5	14 ^{3}										15
10	(Czech Republic) Martin Prokop	9	9		5										14
11	(France) Sébastien Ogier	Ret	11	8	7										10
12	(France) François Delecour	6													8
13	(Netherlands) Dennis Kuipers				6										8
14	(Portugal) Armindo Araújo	10	15	7	15										7
15	(Norway) Henning Solberg	13	7	DNS	DNS										6
16	(France) Pierre Campana	7													6
17	(Belgium) Thierry Neuville	Ret	12	13	8										4
18	(Sweden) Patrik Sandell		8		Ret										4
19	(Finland) Jari Ketomaa		Ret		9										2
20	(United States) Ken Block			9											2
21	(Netherlands) Peter van Merksteijn Jr.		19		10										1
22	(Mexico) Ricardo Triviño			10	26										1
23	(Norway) Eyvind Brynildsen		10												1
Pos	Driver	MON (Monaco)	SWE (Sweden)	MEX (Mexico)	POR (Portugal)	ARG (Argentina)	GRE (Greece)	NZL (New Zealand)	FIN (Finland)	GER (Germany)	GBR (United Kingdom)	FRA (France)	ITA (Italy)	ESP (Spain)	Pts

Key
Colour	Result
Gold	Winner
Silver	2nd place
Bronze	3rd place
Green	Points finish
Blue	Non-points finish
Blue	Non-classified finish (NC)
Purple	Did not finish (Ret)
Black	Excluded (EX)
Black	Disqualified (DSQ)
White	Did not start (DNS)
White	Cancelled (C)
Blank	Withdrew entry from the event (WD)

Notes:

- ^{1} ^{2} ^{3} refers to the classification of the drivers on the 'Power Stage', where bonus points are awarded 3–2–1 for the fastest three drivers on the stage.

=== Manufacturers' championship ===
Pos	Manufacturer	MON (Monaco)	SWE (Sweden)	MEX (Mexico)	POR (Portugal)	ARG (Argentina)	GRE (Greece)	NZL (New Zealand)	FIN (Finland)	GER (Germany)	GBR (United Kingdom)	FRA (France)	ITA (Italy)	ESP (Spain)	Pts
1	(France) Citroën Total World Rally Team	37	28	43	0										108
2	(United Kingdom) Ford World Rally Team	15	40	15	26										96
3	(United Kingdom) M-Sport Ford World Rally Team	16	12	10	31										69
4	Qatar World Rally Team		8	8	15										31
5	(United Kingdom) Mini WRC Team^{†}	26													26
6	(France) Citroën Junior World Rally Team			6	12										18
7	(Norway) Adapta World Rally Team			12											12
8	Brazil World Rally Team				10										10
–	(Portugal) Armindo Araújo World Rally Team^{‡}	4													0
–	(Brazil) Palmeirinha Rally^{‡}	2													0
Pos	Manufacturer	MON (Monaco)	SWE (Sweden)	MEX (Mexico)	POR (Portugal)	ARG (Argentina)	GRE (Greece)	NZL (New Zealand)	FIN (Finland)	GER (Germany)	GBR (United Kingdom)	FRA (France)	ITA (Italy)	ESP (Spain)	Pts

Notes:

- † — The Mini WRC Team lost its manufacturer status in February when parent company BMW withdrew works support from the team, demoting them to customer team status. The team kept the points it scored on Rallye Monte Carlo although it was no longer classified as a manufacturer entrant. They were replaced by the WRC Team Mini Portugal as the official Mini works team.
- ‡ — Armindo Araújo World Rally Team and Palmeirinha Rally merged to form WRC Team Mini Portugal. The points they scored at the Rallye Monte Carlo were removed from the manufacturers' championship.

=== SWRC Drivers' championship ===
Pos	Driver	MON (Monaco)	SWE (Sweden)	POR (Portugal)	NZL (New Zealand)	FIN (Finland)	GBR (United Kingdom)	FRA (France)	ESP (Spain)	Pts
1	(Republic of Ireland) Craig Breen	1	2	Ret						43
2	(New Zealand) Hayden Paddon		4	1						37
3	(Poland) Maciej Oleksowicz		6	2						26
4	(Sweden) Per-Gunnar Andersson	Ret	1							25
5	(Sweden) Pontus Tidemand		3							15
6	(Portugal) Pedro Meireles			3						15
7	(Saudi Arabia) Yazeed Al-Rajhi		5	Ret						10
8	(United Kingdom) Alister McRae		7							6
–	(Italy) Giandomenico Basso	Ret								0
Pos	Driver	MON (Monaco)	SWE (Sweden)	POR (Portugal)	NZL (New Zealand)	FIN (Finland)	GBR (United Kingdom)	FRA (France)	ESP (Spain)	Pts

Key
Colour	Result
Gold	Winner
Silver	2nd place
Bronze	3rd place
Green	Points finish
Blue	Non-points finish
Blue	Non-classified finish (NC)
Purple	Did not finish (Ret)
Black	Excluded (EX)
Black	Disqualified (DSQ)
White	Did not start (DNS)
White	Cancelled (C)
Blank	Withdrew entry from the event (WD)

=== WRC Academy Drivers' Championship ===
Pos	Driver	POR (Portugal)	GRE (Greece)	FIN (Finland)	GER (Germany)	FRA (France)	ESP (Spain)	Pts
1	(United Kingdom) Alastair Fisher	1 ^{3}						28
2	(Australia) Brendan Reeves	2 ^{2}						20
3	(Sweden) Pontus Tidemand	3 ^{1}						16
4	(Netherlands) Timo van der Marel	4						12
5	(Sweden) Fredrik Ahlin	6 ^{3}						11
6	(Spain) Jose Antonio Suarez	5						10
7	(United Kingdom) Elfyn Evans	7						6
8	(Portugal) João Silva	8						4
9	(United Kingdom) John MacCrone	9						2
—	(United States) Christopher Duplessis	Ret						0
Pos	Driver	POR (Portugal)	GRE (Greece)	FIN (Finland)	GER (Germany)	FRA (France)	ESP (Spain)	Pts

Key
Colour	Result
Gold	Winner
Silver	2nd place
Bronze	3rd place
Green	Points finish
Blue	Non-points finish
Blue	Non-classified finish (NC)
Purple	Did not finish (Ret)
Black	Excluded (EX)
Black	Disqualified (DSQ)
White	Did not start (DNS)
White	Cancelled (C)
Blank	Withdrew entry from the event (WD)

Notes:

- ^{1} refers to the number of stages won, where a bonus point is awarded per stage win.
