= 2012 Rally Argentina =

Motor rally competition

2012 Rally Argentina 32º Philips Rally Argentina
Round 5 of the 2012 World Rally Championship season
← Previous event	Next event →
- Host country: Argentina
- Rally base: Córdoba, Argentina
- Dates run: 26 – 29 April 2012
- Stages: 19 (502.73 km; 312.38 miles)
- Stage surface: Gravel
- Overall distance: 1,770.92 km (1,100.40 miles)

Statistics
- Crews: 42 at start, 27 at finish

Overall results
- Overall winner: (France) Sébastien Loeb (France) Citroën Total WRT

The 32nd Philips Rally Argentina was the fifth round of 2012 FIA World Rally Championship. It is the longest rally of the year, covering total of 502.73 stage kilometres, with Ambul also being the longest stage of the year. The event took place between 26 and 29 April 2012.

== Report ==
Ford World Rally Team driver Jari-Matti Latvala was forced out of the rally after his accident while training two weeks before the rally. He was replaced by Dani Sordo.

== Results ==
=== Event standings ===
Pos.	Driver	Co-driver	Car	Time	Difference	Points
Overall
1.	(France) Sébastien Loeb	(Monaco) Daniel Elena	Citroën DS3 WRC	5:34:38.8	0.0	25
2.	(Finland) Mikko Hirvonen	(Finland) Jarmo Lehtinen	Citroën DS3 WRC	5:34:54.0	15.2	20
3.	(Norway) Mads Østberg	(Sweden) Jonas Andersson	Ford Fiesta RS WRC	5:37:49.2	3:10.4	15
4.	(Czech Republic) Martin Prokop	(Czech Republic) Zdeněk Hrůza	Ford Fiesta RS WRC	5:44:24.1	9:45.3	12
5.	(Belgium) Thierry Neuville	(Belgium) Nicolas Gilsoul	Citroën DS3 WRC	5:45:56.4	11:17.6	10
6.	(Norway) Petter Solberg	(United Kingdom) Chris Patterson	Ford Fiesta RS WRC	5:46:41.0	12:02.2	11
7.	(France) Sébastien Ogier	(France) Julien Ingrassia	Škoda Fabia S2000	5:47:04.1	12:25.3	6
8.	(Russia) Evgeny Novikov	(France) Denis Giraudet	Ford Fiesta RS WRC	5:55:49.0	21:10.2	4
9.	(Qatar) Nasser Al-Attiyah	(Italy) Giovanni Bernacchini	Citroën DS3 WRC	6:03:01.4	28:22.6	3
10.	(Estonia) Ott Tänak	(Estonia) Kuldar Sikk	Ford Fiesta RS WRC	6:11:58.3	37:19.5	1
PWRC
1.(11.)	(Mexico) Benito Guerra	(Spain) Borja Rozada	Mitsubishi Lancer Evolution X	6:12:00.6	0.0	25
2.(13.)	(Peru) Nicolás Fuchs	(Argentina) Fernando Mussano	Mitsubishi Lancer Evolution X	6:16:19.7	4:19.1	18
3.(14.)	(Ukraine) Valeriy Gorban	(Ukraine) Andriy Nikolaiev	Mitsubishi Lancer Evolution IX	6:18:45.2	6:44.6	15
4.(15.)	(Argentina) Marcos Ligato	(Argentina) Rubén García	Subaru Impreza WRX STI	6:25:00.0	12:59.4	12
5.(16.)	(Italy) Gianluca Linari	(Italy) Nicola Arena	Subaru Impreza WRX STI	6:40:24.8	28:24.2	10
6.(17.)	(Argentina) Ezequiel Campos	(Argentina) Cristian Winkler	Mitsubishi Lancer Evolution X	6:47:27.4	35:26.8	8
7.(18.)	(Indonesia) Subhan Aksa	(Indonesia) Hade Mboi	Mitsubishi Lancer Evolution X	6:47:44.9	35:44.3	6
8.(23.)	(Italy) Lorenzo Bertelli	(Italy) Lorenzo Granai	Mitsubishi Lancer Evolution IX	7:35:06.4	1:23:05.8	4

=== Special stages ===
All dates and times are ART (UTC–3).

Day	Stage	Time	Name	Length	Winner	Time	Avg. spd.	Rally leader
Leg 1 (26–27 Apr)	SS1	20:08	SSS Amarok 1	6.04 km	(Norway) Petter Solberg	4:54.9	73.73 km/h	(Norway) Petter Solberg
Leg 1 (26–27 Apr)	SS2	7:28	La Pampa / La Pampa 1	37.51 km	(France) Sébastien Loeb	23:12.5	96.97 km/h	(Norway) Petter Solberg
Leg 1 (26–27 Apr)	SS3	8:21	Ascochinga / Agua de Oro 1	51.88 km	(Norway) Petter Solberg	37:50.7	82.25 km/h	(Norway) Petter Solberg
Leg 1 (26–27 Apr)	SS4	12:46	La Pampa / La Pampa 2	37.51 km	(France) Sébastien Loeb	22:56.3	98.11 km/h	(Finland) Mikko Hirvonen
Leg 1 (26–27 Apr)	SS5	13:39	Ascochinga / Agua de Oro 2	51.88 km	(France) Sébastien Loeb	37:21.8	83.31 km/h	(France) Sébastien Loeb
Leg 1 (26–27 Apr)	SS6	17:23	Cosquin / Villa Allende	19.18 km	(Finland) Mikko Hirvonen	13:36.7	84.54 km/h	(France) Sébastien Loeb
Leg 2 (28 Apr)	SS7	8:30	San Agustin / Santa Rosa 1	20.18 km	(France) Sébastien Loeb	12:41.3	95.42 km/h	(France) Sébastien Loeb
Leg 2 (28 Apr)	SS8	9:18	Amboy / Santa Monica 1	20.33 km	(Finland) Mikko Hirvonen	10:40.5	114.26 km/h	(France) Sébastien Loeb
Leg 2 (28 Apr)	SS9	10:31	Intiyaco / Golpe de Agua 1	39.74 km	(Finland) Mikko Hirvonen	22:48.1	104.57 km/h	(France) Sébastien Loeb
Leg 2 (28 Apr)	SS10	14:44	San Agustin / Santa Rosa 2	20.18 km	(Norway) Petter Solberg	12:32.3	96.57 km/h	(France) Sébastien Loeb
Leg 2 (28 Apr)	SS11	15:32	Amboy / Santa Monica 2	20.33 km	(Norway) Petter Solberg	10:30.4	116.10 km/h	(France) Sébastien Loeb
Leg 2 (28 Apr)	SS12	16:45	Intiyaco / Golpe de Agua 2	39.74 km	(Norway) Petter Solberg	22:36.2	105.49 km/h	(France) Sébastien Loeb
Leg 2 (28 Apr)	SS13	20:08	SSS Amarok 2	6.04 km	(Belgium) Thierry Neuville	4:49.4	75.13 km/h	(France) Sébastien Loeb
Leg 3 (29 Apr)	SS14	8:00	Matadero / Ambul	65.74 km	(Norway) Petter Solberg	38:16.0	103.08 km/h	(France) Sébastien Loeb
Leg 3 (29 Apr)	SS15	9:51	Mina Clavero / Giulio Cesare 1	17.41 km	(Norway) Petter Solberg	15:38.1	66.81 km/h	(France) Sébastien Loeb
Leg 3 (29 Apr)	SS16	10:32	El Condor / Copina	16.32 km	(Norway) Petter Solberg	13:17.5	73.67 km/h	(France) Sébastien Loeb
Leg 3 (29 Apr)	SS17	14:07	Mina Clavero / Giulio Cesare 2	17.41 km	(Norway) Petter Solberg	15:29.3	67.44 km/h	(France) Sébastien Loeb
Leg 3 (29 Apr)	SS18	14:48	El Condor / Casilla Negra	11.16 km	(Norway) Petter Solberg	9:37.6	69.56 km/h	(France) Sébastien Loeb
Leg 3 (29 Apr)	SS19	15:21	Copina (Power stage)	4.15 km	(Norway) Petter Solberg	2:32.9	97.71 km/h	(France) Sébastien Loeb

=== Power Stage ===
The "Power stage" was a 4.15 km (2.58 mi) stage at the end of the rally.

Pos	Driver	Time	Diff.	Avg. speed	Points
1	(Norway) Petter Solberg	2:32.915	0.000	97.7 km/h	3
2	(Finland) Mikko Hirvonen	2:34.063	+1.148	97.0 km/h	2
3	(Qatar) Nasser Al-Attiyah	2:34.470	+1.555	96.8 km/h	1

== Championship standings after the event ==
=== Drivers' championship ===
Points are awarded to the top 10 classified finishers.

Position	1st	2nd	3rd	4th	5th	6th	7th	8th	9th	10th
Points	25	18	15	12	10	8	6	4	2	1

Pos	Driver	MON (Monaco)	SWE (Sweden)	MEX (Mexico)	POR (Portugal)	ARG (Argentina)	GRE (Greece)	NZL (New Zealand)	FIN (Finland)	GER (Germany)	GBR (United Kingdom)	FRA (France)	ITA (Italy)	ESP (Spain)	Pts
1	(France) Sébastien Loeb	1 ^{1}	6 ^{1}	1 ^{2}	Ret	1									91
2	(Norway) Petter Solberg	3	4 ^{2}	3 ^{1}	3	6 ^{1}									73
3	(Finland) Mikko Hirvonen	4 ^{2}	2	2	DSQ	2 ^{2}									70
4	(Norway) Mads Østberg		3	4 ^{3}	1	3									68
5	(Russia) Evgeny Novikov	5 ^{3}	5	Ret	2	8									43
6	(Finland) Jari-Matti Latvala	Ret	1 ^{3}	Ret	13 ^{2}	Inj									28
7	(Czech Republic) Martin Prokop	9	9		5	4									26
8	(Qatar) Nasser Al-Attiyah		21	6	4	9 ^{3}									23
9	(Spain) Dani Sordo	2	Ret		11 ^{1}	Ret									21
10	(Estonia) Ott Tänak	8	Ret	5	14 ^{3}	10									16
11	(France) Sébastien Ogier	Ret	11	8	7	7									16
12	(Belgium) Thierry Neuville	Ret	12	13	8	5									14
13	(France) François Delecour	6													8
14	(Netherlands) Dennis Kuipers				6										8
15	(Portugal) Armindo Araújo	10	15	7	15	Ret									7
16	(Norway) Henning Solberg	13	7	DNS	DNS										6
17	(France) Pierre Campana	7													6
18	(Sweden) Patrik Sandell		8		Ret										4
19	(Finland) Jari Ketomaa		Ret		9										2
20	(United States) Ken Block			9											2
21	(Netherlands) Peter van Merksteijn Jr.		19		10										1
22	(Mexico) Ricardo Triviño			10	26	Ret									1
23	(Norway) Eyvind Brynildsen		10												1
Pos	Driver	MON (Monaco)	SWE (Sweden)	MEX (Mexico)	POR (Portugal)	ARG (Argentina)	GRE (Greece)	NZL (New Zealand)	FIN (Finland)	GER (Germany)	GBR (United Kingdom)	FRA (France)	ITA (Italy)	ESP (Spain)	Pts

Key
Colour	Result
Gold	Winner
Silver	2nd place
Bronze	3rd place
Green	Points finish
Blue	Non-points finish
Blue	Non-classified finish (NC)
Purple	Did not finish (Ret)
Black	Excluded (EX)
Black	Disqualified (DSQ)
White	Did not start (DNS)
White	Cancelled (C)
Blank	Withdrew entry from the event (WD)

Notes:

- ^{1} ^{2} ^{3} refers to the classification of the drivers on the 'Power Stage', where bonus points are awarded 3–2–1 for the fastest three drivers on the stage.

=== Manufacturers' championship ===
Pos	Manufacturer	MON (Monaco)	SWE (Sweden)	MEX (Mexico)	POR (Portugal)	ARG (Argentina)	GRE (Greece)	NZL (New Zealand)	FIN (Finland)	GER (Germany)	GBR (United Kingdom)	FRA (France)	ITA (Italy)	ESP (Spain)	Pts
1	(France) Citroën Total World Rally Team	37	28	43	0	43									151
2	(United Kingdom) Ford World Rally Team	15	40	15	26	10									106
3	(United Kingdom) M-Sport Ford World Rally Team	16	12	10	31	12									81
4	Qatar World Rally Team		8	8	15	6									37
5	(France) Citroën Junior World Rally Team			6	12	12									30
6	(Norway) Adapta World Rally Team			12		15									27
7	(United Kingdom) Mini WRC Team^{†}	26													26
8	Brazil World Rally Team				10	0									10
–	(Portugal) Armindo Araújo World Rally Team^{‡}	4													0
–	(Brazil) Palmeirinha Rally^{‡}	2													0
Pos	Manufacturer	MON (Monaco)	SWE (Sweden)	MEX (Mexico)	POR (Portugal)	ARG (Argentina)	GRE (Greece)	NZL (New Zealand)	FIN (Finland)	GER (Germany)	GBR (United Kingdom)	FRA (France)	ITA (Italy)	ESP (Spain)	Pts

Notes:

- † — The Mini WRC Team lost its manufacturer status in February when parent company BMW withdrew works support from the team, demoting them to customer team status. The team kept the points it scored on Rallye Monte Carlo although it was no longer classified as a manufacturer entrant. They were replaced by the WRC Team Mini Portugal as the official Mini works team.
- ‡ — Armindo Araújo World Rally Team and Palmeirinha Rally merged to form WRC Team Mini Portugal. The points they scored at the Rallye Monte Carlo were removed from the manufacturers' championship.

=== PWRC Drivers' championship ===
Pos	Driver	MON (Monaco)	MEX (Mexico)	ARG (Argentina)	GRE (Greece)	NZL (New Zealand)	GER (Germany)	ITA (Italy)	ESP (Spain)	Pts
1	(Mexico) Benito Guerra		1	1						50
2	(Poland) Michał Kościuszko	1	3	Ret						40
3	(Peru) Nicolás Fuchs	DNS	2	2						36
4	(Italy) Gianluca Linari		4	5						22
5	(United Kingdom) Louise Cook	2								18
6	(Ukraine) Valeriy Gorban			3						15
7	(Argentina) Marcos Ligato			4						12
8	(Mexico) Rodrigo Salgado		5							10
9	(Sweden) Ramona Karlsson		6	Ret						8
10	(Argentina) Ezequiel Campos			6						8
11	(Indonesia) Subhan Aksa			7						6
12	(Italy) Lorenzo Bertelli	Ret		8						4
Pos	Driver	MON (Monaco)	MEX (Mexico)	ARG (Argentina)	GRE (Greece)	NZL (New Zealand)	GER (Germany)	ITA (Italy)	ESP (Spain)	Pts

Key
Colour	Result
Gold	Winner
Silver	2nd place
Bronze	3rd place
Green	Points finish
Blue	Non-points finish
Blue	Non-classified finish (NC)
Purple	Did not finish (Ret)
Black	Excluded (EX)
Black	Disqualified (DSQ)
White	Did not start (DNS)
White	Cancelled (C)
Blank	Withdrew entry from the event (WD)
