= 2012 Rally México =

Motor rally competition

2012 Rally México Rally Guanajuato México
Round 3 of the 2012 World Rally Championship season
| ← Previous event | Next event → |
- Host country: Mexico
- Rally base: León, Mexico
- Dates run: March 8 – 11 2012
- Stages: 24 (408.5 km; 253.8 miles)
- Stage surface: Gravel

Statistics
- Crews: 27 at start, 19 at finish

Overall results
- Overall winner: (France) Sébastien Loeb (France) Citroën Total WRT

The 2012 Rally México was the third round of the 2012 World Rally Championship (WRC) season. The rally took place between 8 and 11 March 2012.

== Results ==
=== Event standings ===
| Pos. | Driver | Co-driver | Car | Time | Difference | Points |
Overall
| 1. | (France) Sébastien Loeb | (Monaco) Daniel Elena | Citroën DS3 WRC | 4:15:32.7 | 0.0 | 27 |
| 2. | (Finland) Mikko Hirvonen | (Finland) Jarmo Lehtinen | Citroën DS3 WRC | 4:16:15.1 | 42.4 | 18 |
| 3. | (Norway) Petter Solberg | (United Kingdom) Chris Patterson | Ford Fiesta RS WRC | 4:17:44.1 | 2:11.4 | 18 |
| 4. | (Norway) Mads Østberg | (Sweden) Jonas Andersson | Ford Fiesta RS WRC | 4:20:24.2 | 4:51.5 | 13 |
| 5. | (Estonia) Ott Tänak | (Estonia) Kuldar Sikk | Ford Fiesta RS WRC | 4:20:35.3 | 5:02.6 | 10 |
| 6. | (Qatar) Nasser Al-Attiyah | (Italy) Giovanni Bernacchini | Citroën DS3 WRC | 4:22:14.1 | 6:41.4 | 8 |
| 7. | (Portugal) Armindo Araújo | (Portugal) Miguel Ramalho | Mini John Cooper Works WRC | 4:28:19.6 | 12:46.9 | 6 |
| 8. | (France) Sébastien Ogier | (France) Julien Ingrassia | Skoda Fabia S2000 | 4:30:30.5 | 14:57.8 | 4 |
| 9. | (United States) Ken Block | (Italy) Alex Gelsomino | Ford Fiesta RS WRC | 4:37:59.5 | 22:26.8 | 2 |
| 10. | (Mexico) Ricardo Triviño | (Spain) Álex Haro | Ford Fiesta RS WRC | 4:39:03.4 | 23:30.7 | 1 |
Production Class 3 / PWRC
| 1.(11.) | (Mexico) Benito Guerra | (Spain) Borja Rozada | Mitsubishi Lancer Evo X | 4:39:26.1 | 0.0 | 25 |
| 2.(12.) | (Peru) Nicolás Fuchs | (Argentina) Fernando Mussano | Mitsubishi Lancer Evo X | 4:43:36.0 | 4:09.9 | 18 |
| 3.(14.) | (Poland) Michał Kościuszko | (Poland) Maciek Szczepaniak | Mitsubishi Lancer Evo X | 5:00:13.5 | 20:47.4 | 15 |
| 4.(15.) | (Italy) Gianluca Linari | (Italy) Nicola Arena | Subaru Impreza WRX STI | 5:14:08.1 | 34:42.0 | 12 |
| 5.(16.) | (Hungary) Tibor Érdi Jr. | (Hungary) Attila Taborszki | Mitsubishi Lancer Evo X | 5:30:29.5 | 51:03.4 | -* |
| 6.(17.) | (Mexico) Rodrigo Salgado | (Mexico) Diódoro Salgado | Mitsubishi Lancer Evo IX | 5:45:54.9 | 1:06:28.8 | 10 |
| 7.(18.) | (Sweden) Ramona Karlsson | (Sweden) Miriam Walfridsson | Mitsubishi Lancer Evo X | 5:59:29.2 | 1:20:03.1 | 8 |

*This team does not score points in the PWRC championship.

=== Special stages ===
| Day | Stage | Time (UTC−6) | Name | Length | Winner | Time | Avg. spd. | Rally leader |
|---|---|---|---|---|---|---|---|---|
| Leg 1 (8–9 Mar) | SS1 | 20:09 | DC Shoes Guanajuato Street Stage | 1.05 km | (Norway) Petter Solberg | 53.7 | 70.39 km/h | (Norway) Petter Solberg |
| Leg 1 (8–9 Mar) | SS2 | 8:08 | El Cubilete 1 | 22.12 km | (Finland) Mikko Hirvonen | 13:23.6 | 99.09 km/h | (Finland) Mikko Hirvonen |
| Leg 1 (8–9 Mar) | SS3 | 9:06 | Las Minas 1 | 15.21 km | (Finland) Jari-Matti Latvala | 11:22.9 | 80.18 km/h | (Finland) Jari-Matti Latvala |
| Leg 1 (8–9 Mar) | SS4 | 9:47 | Los Mexicanos 1 | 9.76 km | (France) Sébastien Loeb | 7:53.3 | 74.24 km/h | (Finland) Jari-Matti Latvala |
| Leg 1 (8–9 Mar) | SS5 | 10:08 | Ortega 1 | 23.69 km | (France) Sébastien Loeb | 14:08.7 | 100.49 km/h | (Finland) Mikko Hirvonen |
| Leg 1 (8–9 Mar) | SS6 | 13:36 | El Cubilete 2 | 22.12 km | (Finland) Jari-Matti Latvala | 13:11.8 | 101.86 km/h | (France) Sébastien Loeb |
| Leg 1 (8–9 Mar) | SS7 | 14:34 | Las Minas 2 | 15.21 km | (Finland) Jari-Matti Latvala | 11:03.1 | 82.58 km/h | (France) Sébastien Loeb |
| Leg 1 (8–9 Mar) | SS8 | 15:15 | Los Mexicanos 2 | 9.76 km | (Finland) Jari-Matti Latvala | 7:43.6 | 75.79 km/h | (France) Sébastien Loeb |
| Leg 1 (8–9 Mar) | SS9 | 15:36 | Ortega 2 | 23.69 km | stage cancelled | | | (France) Sébastien Loeb |
| Leg 1 (8–9 Mar) | SS10 | 17:24 | Monster León Street Stage | 1.23 km | (France) Sébastien Loeb | 1:16.4 | 57.96 km/h | (France) Sébastien Loeb |
| Leg 1 (8–9 Mar) | SS11 | 20:13 | Super Special 1 | 2.21 km | (Qatar) Nasser Al-Attiyah | 1:39.5 | 79.96 km/h | (France) Sébastien Loeb |
| Leg 1 (8–9 Mar) | SS12 | 20:18 | Super Special 2 | 2.21 km | (Australia) Chris Atkinson | 1:38.3 | 80.94 km/h | (France) Sébastien Loeb |
| Leg 2 (10 Mar) | SS13 | 6:54 | Ibarrilla 1 | 29.90 km | (Finland) Jari-Matti Latvala | 18:01.4 | 99.54 km/h | (France) Sébastien Loeb |
| Leg 2 (10 Mar) | SS14 | 8:12 | Otates 1 | 41.88 km | (France) Sébastien Loeb | 30:19.9 | 82.84 km/h | (France) Sébastien Loeb |
| Leg 2 (10 Mar) | SS15 | 11:06 | Ibarrilla 2 | 29.90 km | (France) Sébastien Loeb | 17:55.3 | 100.10 km/h | (France) Sébastien Loeb |
| Leg 2 (10 Mar) | SS16 | 12:24 | Otates 2 | 41.88 km | (Finland) Jari-Matti Latvala | 29:54.7 | 84.01 km/h | (France) Sébastien Loeb |
| Leg 2 (10 Mar) | SS17 | 15:30 | Comanjilla 1 | 17.91 km | (Finland) Jari-Matti Latvala | 10:21.1 | 103.81 km/h | (France) Sébastien Loeb |
| Leg 2 (10 Mar) | SS18 | 16:45 | Super Special 3 | 4.42 km | (Norway) Petter Solberg (France) Sébastien Loeb | 3:14.3 | 81.89 km/h | (France) Sébastien Loeb |
| Leg 2 (10 Mar) | SS19 | 16:50 | Super Special 4 | 2.21 km | stage cancelled | | | (France) Sébastien Loeb |
| Leg 2 (10 Mar) | SS20 | 17:23 | Comanjilla 2 | 17.91 km | (Finland) Jari-Matti Latvala | 10:13.7 | 105.06 km/h | (France) Sébastien Loeb |
| Leg 3 (11 Mar) | SS21 | 9:30 | Super Special 5 | 4.42 km | (Belgium) Thierry Neuville | 3:12.5 | 82.7 km/h | (France) Sébastien Loeb |
| Leg 3 (11 Mar) | SS22 | 10:33 | Guanajuatito | 54.76 km | (Finland) Mikko Hirvonen | 36:30.7 | 89.2 km/h | (France) Sébastien Loeb |
| Leg 3 (11 Mar) | SS23 | 12:06 | Derramadero | 11.51 km | (France) Sébastien Loeb | 7:14.9 | 87.6 km/h | (France) Sébastien Loeb |
| Leg 3 (11 Mar) | SS24 | 13:18 | VW Power Stage | 5.75 km | (Norway) Petter Solberg | 3:11.4 | 102.7 km/h | (France) Sébastien Loeb |

=== Power Stage ===
The "Power stage" was a 5.46 km (3.39 mi) stage at the end of the rally.

| Pos | Driver | Time | Diff. | Avg. speed | Points |
|---|---|---|---|---|---|
| 1 | (Norway) Petter Solberg | 3:11.429 | 0.000 | 102.7 km/h | 3 |
| 2 | (France) Sébastien Loeb | 3:12.900 | +1.471 | 101.9 km/h | 2 |
| 3 | (Norway) Mads Østberg | 3:14.109 | +2.680 | 101.3 km/h | 1 |

== Championship standings after the event ==
=== Drivers' championship ===
| Position | 1st | 2nd | 3rd | 4th | 5th | 6th | 7th | 8th | 9th | 10th |
| Points | 25 | 18 | 15 | 12 | 10 | 8 | 6 | 4 | 2 | 1 |

| Pos | Driver | MON (Monaco) | SWE (Sweden) | MEX (Mexico) | POR (Portugal) | ARG (Argentina) | GRE (Greece) | NZL (New Zealand) | FIN (Finland) | GER (Germany) | GBR (United Kingdom) | FRA (France) | ITA (Italy) | ESP (Spain) | Pts |
|---|---|---|---|---|---|---|---|---|---|---|---|---|---|---|---|
| 1 | (France) Sébastien Loeb | 1 ^{1} | 6 ^{1} | 1 ^{2} | | | | | | | | | | | 66 |
| 2 | (Finland) Mikko Hirvonen | 4 ^{2} | 2 | 2 | | | | | | | | | | | 50 |
| 3 | (Norway) Petter Solberg | 3 | 4 ^{2} | 3 ^{1} | | | | | | | | | | | 47 |
| 4 | (Norway) Mads Østberg | | 3 | 4 ^{3} | | | | | | | | | | | 28 |
| 5 | (Finland) Jari-Matti Latvala | Ret | 1 ^{3} | Ret | | | | | | | | | | | 26 |
| 6 | (Russia) Evgeny Novikov | 5 ^{3} | 5 | Ret | | | | | | | | | | | 21 |
| 7 | (Spain) Dani Sordo | 2 | Ret | | | | | | | | | | | | 18 |
| 8 | (Estonia) Ott Tänak | 8 | Ret | 5 | | | | | | | | | | | 14 |
| 9 | (Qatar) Nasser Al-Attiyah | | 21 | 6 | | | | | | | | | | | 8 |
| 10 | (France) François Delecour | 6 | | | | | | | | | | | | | 8 |
| 11 | (Portugal) Armindo Araújo | 10 | 15 | 7 | | | | | | | | | | | 7 |
| 12 | (Norway) Henning Solberg | 13 | 7 | DNS | | | | | | | | | | | 6 |
| 13 | (France) Pierre Campana | 7 | | | | | | | | | | | | | 6 |
| 14 | (France) Sébastien Ogier | Ret | 11 | 8 | | | | | | | | | | | 4 |
| 15 | (Sweden) Patrik Sandell | | 8 | | | | | | | | | | | | 4 |
| 16 | (Czech Republic) Martin Prokop | 9 | 9 | | | | | | | | | | | | 4 |
| 17 | (United States) Ken Block | | | 9 | | | | | | | | | | | 2 |
| 18 | (Norway) Eyvind Brynildsen | | 10 | | | | | | | | | | | | 1 |
| 19 | (Mexico) Ricardo Triviño | | | 10 | | | | | | | | | | | 1 |
| Pos | Driver | MON (Monaco) | SWE (Sweden) | MEX (Mexico) | POR (Portugal) | ARG (Argentina) | GRE (Greece) | NZL (New Zealand) | FIN (Finland) | GER (Germany) | GBR (United Kingdom) | FRA (France) | ITA (Italy) | ESP (Spain) | Pts |

Key
| Colour | Result |
|---|---|
| Gold | Winner |
| Silver | 2nd place |
| Bronze | 3rd place |
| Green | Points finish |
| Blue | Non-points finish |
| Blue | Non-classified finish (NC) |
| Purple | Did not finish (Ret) |
| Black | Excluded (EX) |
| Black | Disqualified (DSQ) |
| White | Did not start (DNS) |
| White | Cancelled (C) |
| Blank | Withdrew entry from the event (WD) |

Notes:

- ^{1} ^{2} ^{3} refers to the classification of the drivers on the 'Power Stage', where bonus points are awarded 3–2–1 for the fastest three drivers on the stage.

=== Manufacturers' championship ===
| Pos | Manufacturer | MON (Monaco) | SWE (Sweden) | MEX (Mexico) | POR (Portugal) | ARG (Argentina) | GRE (Greece) | NZL (New Zealand) | FIN (Finland) | GER (Germany) | GBR (United Kingdom) | FRA (France) | ITA (Italy) | ESP (Spain) | Pts |
|---|---|---|---|---|---|---|---|---|---|---|---|---|---|---|---|
| 1 | (France) Citroën Total World Rally Team | 37 | 28 | 43 | | | | | | | | | | | 108 |
| 2 | (United Kingdom) Ford World Rally Team | 15 | 40 | 15 | | | | | | | | | | | 70 |
| 3 | (United Kingdom) M-Sport Ford World Rally Team | 16 | 12 | 10 | | | | | | | | | | | 38 |
| 4 | (United Kingdom) Mini WRC Team^{†} | 26 | | | | | | | | | | | | | 26 |
| 5 | Qatar World Rally Team | | 8 | 8 | | | | | | | | | | | 16 |
| 6 | (Norway) Adapta World Rally Team | | | 12 | | | | | | | | | | | 12 |
| 7 | (France) Citroën Junior World Rally Team | | | 6 | | | | | | | | | | | 6 |
| – | (Portugal) Armindo Araújo World Rally Team^{‡} | 4 | | | | | | | | | | | | | 0 |
| – | (Brazil) Palmeirinha Rally^{‡} | 2 | | | | | | | | | | | | | 0 |
| Pos | Manufacturer | MON (Monaco) | SWE (Sweden) | MEX (Mexico) | POR (Portugal) | ARG (Argentina) | GRE (Greece) | NZL (New Zealand) | FIN (Finland) | GER (Germany) | GBR (United Kingdom) | FRA (France) | ITA (Italy) | ESP (Spain) | Pts |

Notes:

- † — The Mini WRC Team lost its manufacturer status in February when parent company BMW withdrew works support from the team, demoting them to customer team status. The team kept the points it scored on Rallye Monte Carlo although it was no longer classified as a manufacturer entrant. They were replaced by the WRC Team Mini Portugal as the official Mini works team.
- ‡ — Armindo Araújo World Rally Team and Palmeirinha Rally merged to form WRC Team Mini Portugal. The points they scored at the Rallye Monte Carlo were removed from the manufacturers' championship.

=== PWRC Drivers' championship ===
| Pos | Driver | MON (Monaco) | MEX (Mexico) | ARG (Argentina) | GRE (Greece) | NZL (New Zealand) | GER (Germany) | ITA (Italy) | ESP (Spain) | Pts |
|---|---|---|---|---|---|---|---|---|---|---|
| 1 | (Poland) Michał Kościuszko | 1 | 3 | | | | | | | 40 |
| 2 | (Mexico) Benito Guerra | | 1 | | | | | | | 25 |
| 3 | (United Kingdom) Louise Cook | 2 | | | | | | | | 18 |
| 4 | (Peru) Nicolás Fuchs | DNS | 2 | | | | | | | 18 |
| 5 | (Italy) Gianluca Linari | | 4 | | | | | | | 12 |
| 6 | (Mexico) Rodrigo Salgado | | 5 | | | | | | | 10 |
| 7 | (Sweden) Ramona Karlsson | | 6 | | | | | | | 8 |
| Pos | Driver | MON (Monaco) | MEX (Mexico) | ARG (Argentina) | GRE (Greece) | NZL (New Zealand) | GER (Germany) | ITA (Italy) | ESP (Spain) | Pts |

Key
| Colour | Result |
|---|---|
| Gold | Winner |
| Silver | 2nd place |
| Bronze | 3rd place |
| Green | Points finish |
| Blue | Non-points finish |
| Blue | Non-classified finish (NC) |
| Purple | Did not finish (Ret) |
| Black | Excluded (EX) |
| Black | Disqualified (DSQ) |
| White | Did not start (DNS) |
| White | Cancelled (C) |
| Blank | Withdrew entry from the event (WD) |
