= Mads Østberg =

Norwegian rally driver (born 1987)

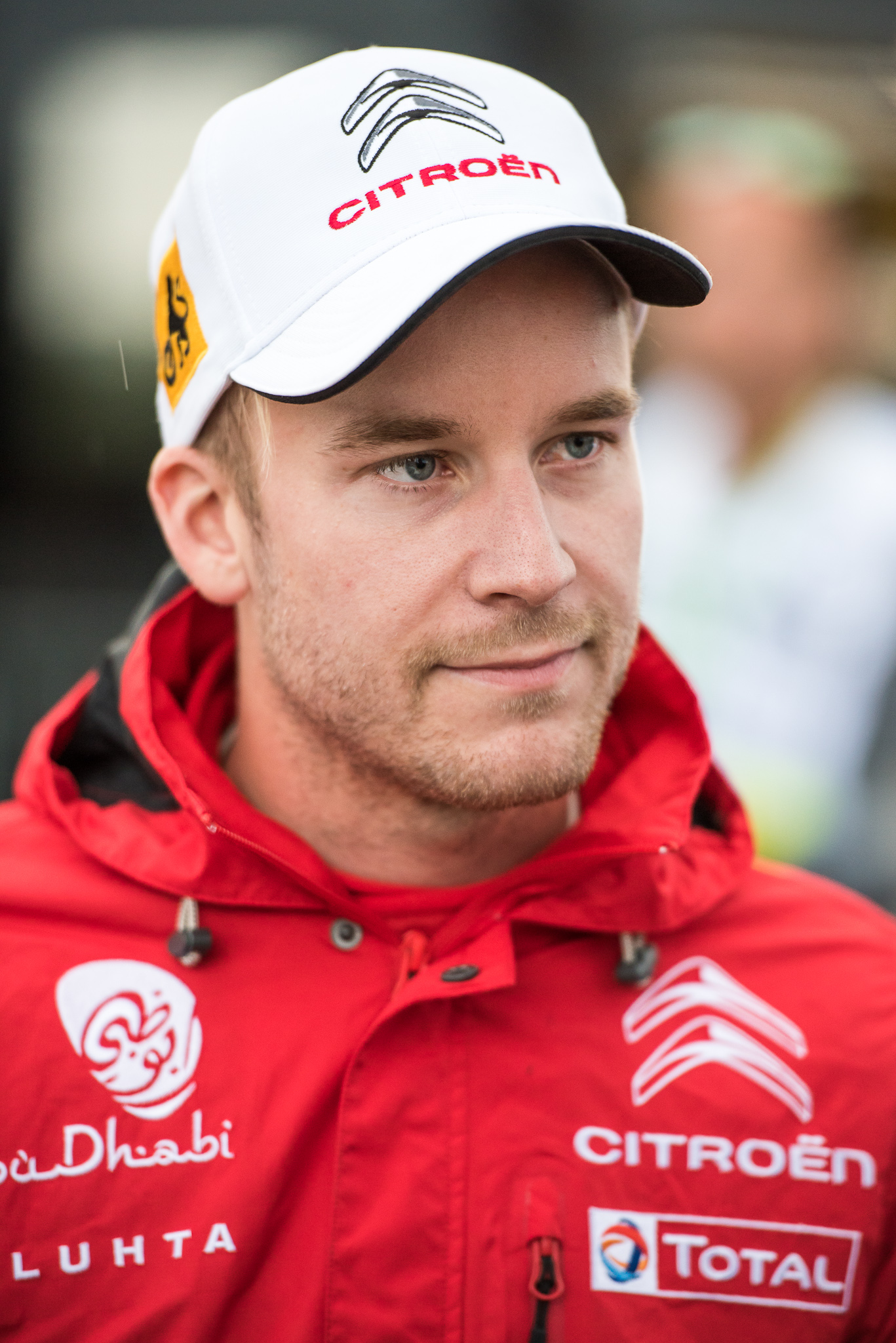
- Mads Østberg at 2014 Rallye Deutschland.

Personal information
- Nationality: (Norway) Norwegian
- Born: 11 October 1987 (age 39); Våler, Østfold, Norway

World Rally Championship record
- Years active: 2006–2021
- Co-driver: (Norway) Ragnar Engen (Norway) Ole Kristian Unnerud (Norway) Veronica Gulbæk Engan (Sweden) Jonas Andersson (Norway) Ola Fløene (Norway) Torstein Eriksen (Sweden) Emil Axelsson
- Teams: Stobart Ford, Adapta, M-Sport, Citroën
- Rallies: 139
- Championships: 0
- Rally wins: 1
- Podiums: 18
- Stage wins: 65
- Total points: 815
- First rally: 2006 Swedish Rally
- First win: 2012 Rally de Portugal
- Last win: 2012 Rally de Portugal
- Last rally: 2021 Rally Catalunya

Mads Østberg (born 11 October 1987) is a Norwegian rally driver. His co-driver is Torstein Eriksen.

== Career ==
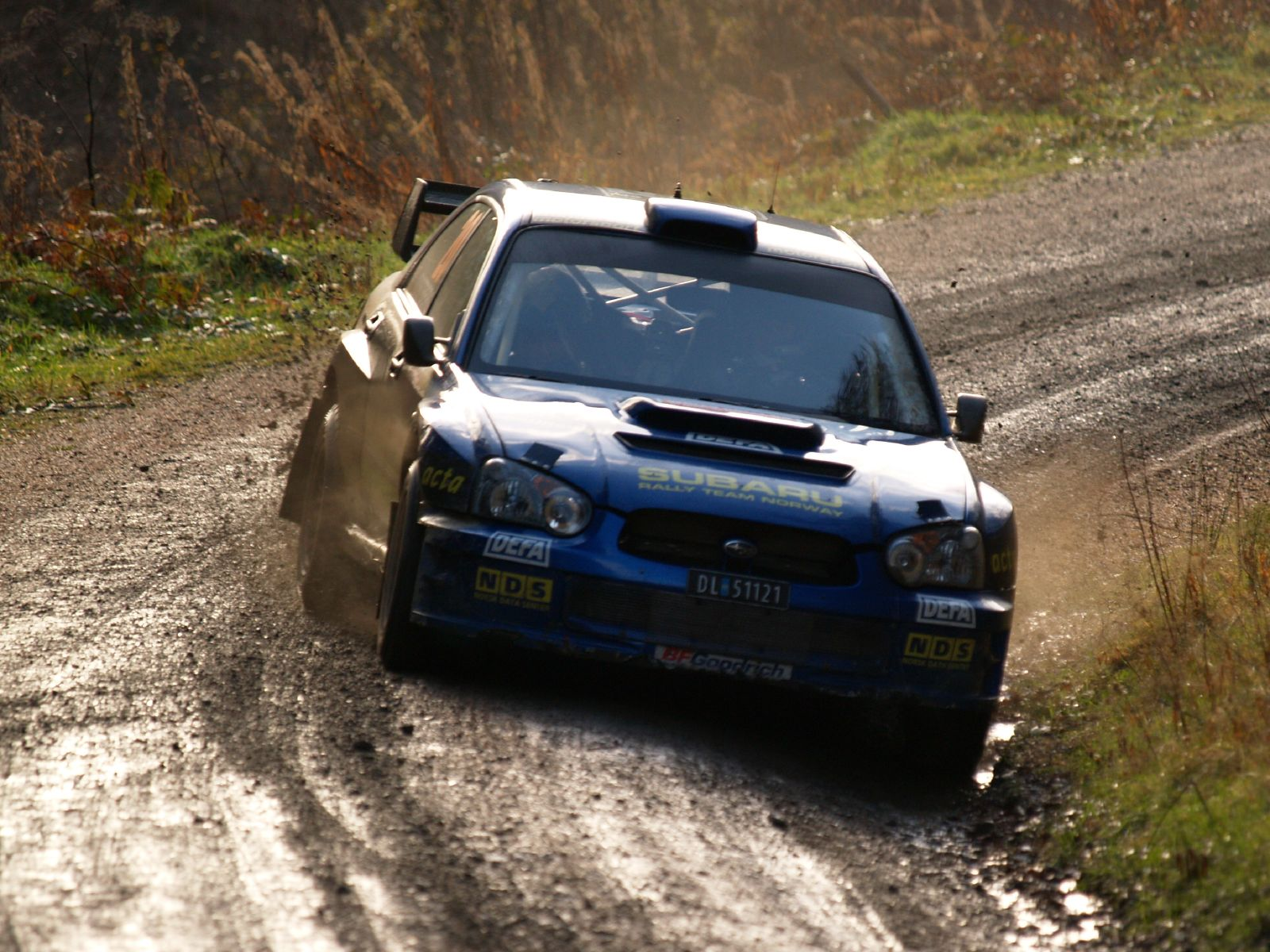
Østberg at the 2007 Wales Rally GB.

Østberg competed in his first rally in 2004. His first World Rally Championship event was the 2006 Swedish Rally, in which he finished 31st in his Subaru Impreza WRC 2003. In the 2006 season, he competed in two more WRC rallies; retiring at the Rally Finland and finishing 23rd at the Wales Rally GB.

In the 2007 season, Østberg continued with an Impreza WRC 2005 and competed in six world rallies for the Prodrive-supported Adapta team. He took his first stage win on a super special stage of the 2007 Swedish Rally, and later achieved his first WRC point by finishing eighth at the 2007 Rally Finland. Østberg also contested the Norwegian Rally Championship and won the national title.

In 2008, Østberg continued to race with Adapta Motorsport in the WRC, using a Subaru Impreza WRC 2007. He did not score any championship points in his seven events. In the 2009 season, Østberg scored points on three WRC rounds and recorded his best-ever finish at the Rally Portugal, finishing sixth. His Adapta AS team was supported by Prodrive because of Subaru's withdrawal from the championship.

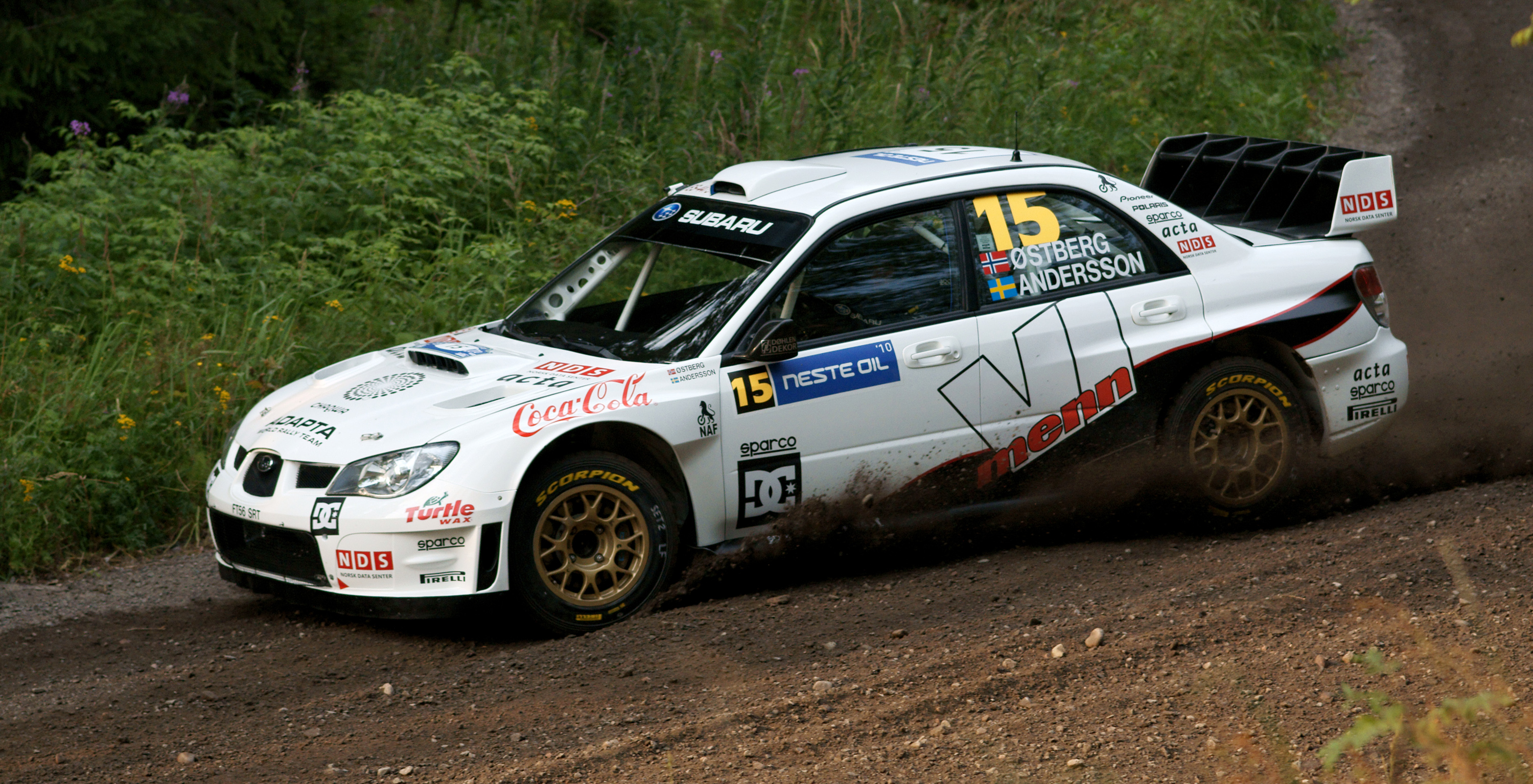
Østberg at the 2010 Rally Finland

In the following season, Østberg contested four WRC rallies in an Impreza WRC 2007 & 2008 and two in a Ford Fiesta S2000. For the second year in running, he placed 11th in the drivers' world championship. Østberg moved to Stobart M-Sport Ford for the 2011 season, driving a Ford Fiesta RS WRC, attaining a second place in 2011 Rally Sweden after leading much of the rally. He gained another second-place finish at 2011 Rally GB, the final round, and ended sixth in the drivers championship.

In 2012, Østberg reverted to Adapta Motorsport, despite continued to race with a Fiesta RS WRC. After a third place in Sweden, he won his first rally at the 2012 Rally de Portugal after Mikko Hirvonen was disqualified. This made him the first non-French/Finnish driver to win a rally since 2005 and the second Norwegian event winner in WRC history. Østberg followed this up with a third place in Rally Argentina before going on to finish the season in fourth place.

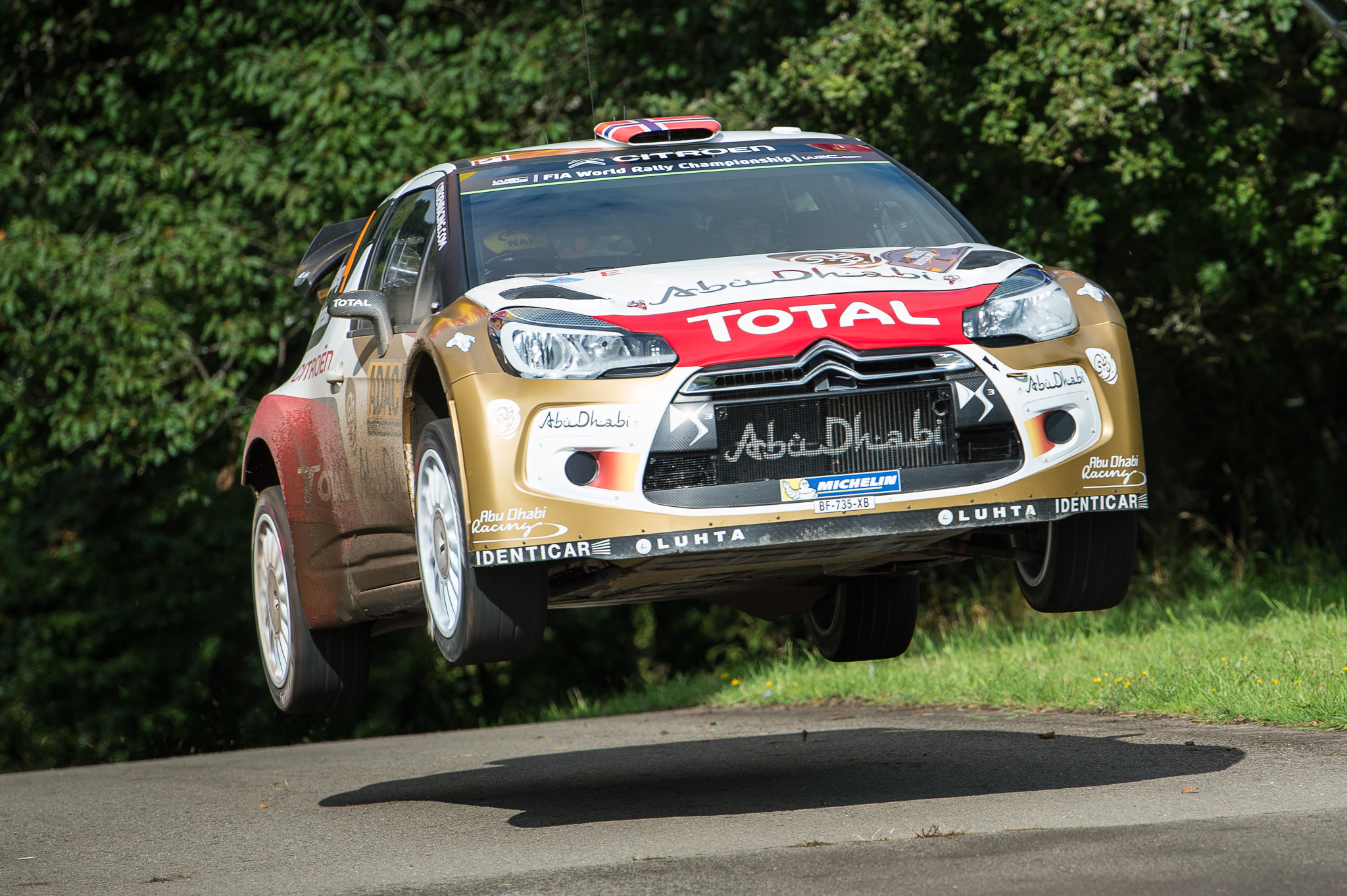
Mads Østberg at the 2014 Rallye Deutschland, with his Citroën DS3 WRC.

Østberg returned to Qatar M-Sport for the 2013 season, this time M-Sport is a 'De Facto' Ford leading team after the American manufacturer's official withdrawal at the end of the 2012 season. Østberg secured two podium finishes and ended the season in sixth place of the drivers championship. In December of that year, it was announced that Østberg would move to Citroën's works team for 2014 with Kris Meeke as his team-mate.

In 2014, Østberg got four podiums, topping at the second place. He got the fifth rank at the drivers championship.

In 2015, Østberg continued to drive for the Citroën World Rally Team. After four competitions, he got two second places and ranked second at the drivers championship. He finally ended the season as the "best of the rest", ranked fourth in the championship behind the trio of VW drivers.

At the end of the 2015 season, it was announced that Østberg would return to M-Sport for 2016, this time driving the Evolution version of the Fiesta RS WRC. He would be partnered by Andreas Mikkelsen's former co-driver Ola Fløene. Østberg got two third places and finished seventh in the standings.

Østberg announced he would take on a limited schedule in a private entry for 2017 (shared with Martin Prokop) as he and wife Beate welcomed his first child in late February.

== WRC victories ==
#	Event	Season	Co-driver	Car
1	46° Rally de Portugal	2012	(Sweden) Jonas Andersson	Ford Fiesta RS WRC

== Rally results ==
=== WRC results ===
Year	Entrant	Car	1	2	3	4	5	6	7	8	9	10	11	12	13	14	15	16	WDC	Points
2006	Mads Østberg	Subaru Impreza WRC 2003	MON	SWE; 31	MEX	ESP	FRA	ARG	ITA	GRE	GER	FIN; Ret	JPN	CYP	TUR	AUS	NZL		NC	0
2006	Adapta	Subaru Impreza WRC 2003																GBR; 23	NC	0
2007	Adapta AS	Subaru Impreza WRC 2005	MON	SWE; 9	NOR; 37	MEX	POR; Ret	ARG	ITA; Ret	GRE	FIN; 8	GER	NZL	ESP	FRA	JPN	IRE	GBR; 11	21st	1
2008	Adapta AS	Subaru Impreza WRC 2007	MON	SWE; 9	MEX	ARG	JOR	ITA; 11	GRE; 24	TUR	FIN; Ret	GER	NZL	ESP; 14	FRA; 9	JPN	GBR; Ret		NC	0
2009	Adapta AS	Subaru Impreza WRC2008	IRE	NOR; 9	CYP	POR; 6	ARG	ITA; 7	GRE; 7	POL; Ret	FIN; Ret	AUS	ESP	GBR; Ret					11th	7
2010	Adapta AS	Subaru Impreza WRC2007	SWE; 8	MEX	JOR	TUR	NZL		BUL	FIN; 7				ESP	GBR; 9				11th	18
2010	Adapta AS	Subaru Impreza WRC2008						POR; 7											11th	18
2010	Stobart M-Sport	Ford Fiesta S2000									GER; 16	JPN	FRA; 41						11th	18
2011	M-Sport Stobart	Ford Fiesta RS WRC	SWE; 2	MEX; 5	POR; 31	JOR; 13	ITA; 5	ARG; 5	GRE; 12	FIN; 6	GER; Ret	AUS	FRA; 7	ESP; 6	GBR; 2				6th	88
2012	Mads Østberg	Ford Fiesta RS WRC	MON	SWE; 3															4th	149
2012	Adapta	Ford Fiesta RS WRC			MEX; 4	POR; 1	ARG; 3	GRE; 4	NZL	FIN; 5	GER; 4	GBR; 4	FRA; 5	ITA; 4	ESP; 4				4th	149
2013	Qatar M-Sport	Ford Fiesta RS WRC	MON; 6	SWE; 3	MEX; 11	POR; 8	ARG; 7	GRE; 6	ITA; 8	FIN; 3	GER; 9	AUS; 5	FRA; 8	ESP; 6	GBR; 4				6th	103
2014	Citroën Total Abu Dhabi	Citroën DS3 WRC	MON; 4	SWE; 3	MEX; 9	POR; 3	ARG; Ret	ITA; 2	POL; Ret	FIN; Ret	GER; 6	AUS; 16	FRA; 7	ESP; 4	GBR; 3				5th	108
2015	Citroën Total Abu Dhabi	Citroën DS3 WRC	MON; 4	SWE; 10	MEX; 2	ARG; 2	POR; 7	ITA; 5	POL; 9	FIN; 3	GER; 7	AUS; WD	FRA; 6	ESP; 4	GBR; 7				4th	116
2016	M-Sport	Ford Fiesta RS WRC	MON; 4	SWE; 3	MEX; 3	ARG; 5	POR; 7	ITA; Ret	POL; 8	FIN; 6	GER; 6	CHN; C	FRA; 9	ESP; 5	GBR; 8	AUS; 6			7th	102
2017	M-Sport	Ford Fiesta WRC	MON	SWE; 15	MEX	FRA	ARG; 9	POR; 8	ITA; 7	POL; 7	FIN; 10		ESP; 5	GBR; 38	AUS				15th	29
2017	Adapta	Ford Fiesta R5										GER; WD							15th	29
2018	Citroën Total Abu Dhabi WRT	Citroën C3 WRC	MON	SWE; 6	MEX	FRA	ARG	POR; 6	ITA; 5	FIN; 2	GER; Ret	TUR; 23	GBR; 8	ESP	AUS; 3				10th	70
2019	Citroën Total WRT	Citroën C3 R5	MON	SWE; 11	MEX	FRA	ARG; 9	CHL; 9	POR; 24	ITA; 18	FIN	GER; 17	TUR	GBR; 45	ESP; 9				18th	6
2019	Citroën Total WRT	Citroën C3 WRC														AUS; C			18th	6
2020	PH Sport	Citroën C3 R5	MON; 10	SWE; 12	MEX	EST; 10	TUR	ITA; 14	MNZ; 9										21st	4
2021	TRT World Rally Team	Citroën C3 R5	MON	ARC	CRO; 9	POR; 9	ITA; 6	KEN	EST; 10	BEL	GRE; 31	FIN; 9	ESP; 15	MNZ					14th	15

=== WRC-2 results ===
Year	Entrant	Car	1	2	3	4	5	6	7	8	9	10	11	12	13	Pos.	Points
2017	Adapta	Ford Fiesta R5	MON	SWE	MEX	FRA	ARG	POR	ITA	POL	FIN	GER; WD	ESP	GBR	AUS	NC	0
2020	PH Sport	Citroën C3 R5	MON; 1	SWE; 1	MEX	EST; 1	TUR	ITA; 4	MNZ; 1							1st	112
2021	TRT World Rally Team	Citroën C3 R5	MON	ARC	CRO; 1	POR; 3	ITA; 2	KEN	EST; 2	BEL	GRE; 8	FIN; 2	ESP; 4	MNZ		2nd	126

=== WRC-2 Pro results ===
Year	Entrant	Car	1	2	3	4	5	6	7	8	9	10	11	12	13	14	Pos.	Points
2019	Citroën Total WRT	Citroën C3 R5	MON	SWE; 1	MEX	FRA	ARG; 1	CHL; 2	POR; 3	ITA; 3	FIN	GER; 4	TUR	GBR; 5	ESP; 1	AUS; C	2nd	145

=== ERC results ===
Year	Entrant	Car	1	2	3	4	5	6	7	8	9	10	Pos	Points
2016	RMC Motorsport	Ford Fiesta R5	CAN; Ret	IRE	ACR	AZO	YPR	EST	RZE	ZLI	LIE	CYP	NC	0
2017	Adapta	Ford Fiesta R5	AZO	CAN	ACR	CYP	RZE; Ret	ZLI	RMC	LIE			NC	0
2021	Citroën Rally Team Hungary	Citroën C3 R5	POL	LAT	ITA	CZE	PRT1	PRT2	HUN; 1	ESP			15th	37
2023	Bilteknik TRT Citroën Rally Team	Citroën C3 Rally2	PRT; 2	CAN; 16	POL; 4	LAT; 3	SWE; 8	ITA	CZE; 39	HUN; 1			3rd	115
2024	TRT Rally Team	Citroën C3 Rally2	HUN; DNS	CAN; 8	SWE; 5	EST; 4	ITA; Ret	CZE	GBR	POL			7th	51
2025	TRT Rally Team	Citroën C3 Rally2	ESP; 8	HUN; 2	SWE; 8	POL; 5	ITA; 8	CZE; WD	GBR	CRO; 2			4th	104
