= 2012 Rally Catalunya =

Rally race in Spain

2012 Rally Catalunya 48º Rally RACC Catalunya – Costa Daurada RACC Rally de España
Round 13 of the 2012 World Rally Championship
← Previous event
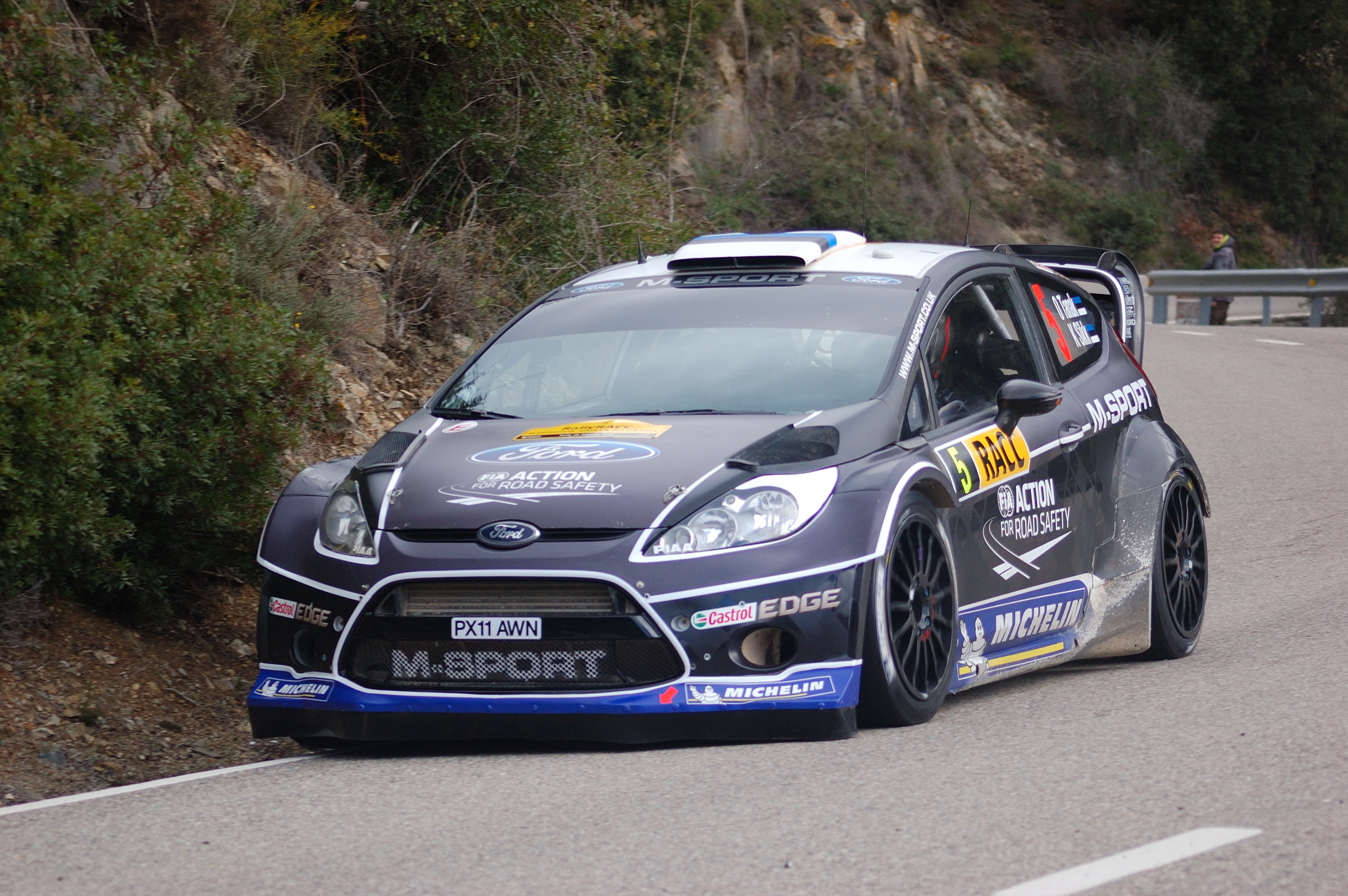
- Host country: Spain
- Rally base: Salou, Tarragona
- Dates run: 9 – 11 November 2012
- Stages: 18 (405.46 km; 251.94 miles)
- Stage surface: Day 1 gravel, days 2 and 3 asphalt
- Overall distance: 1,391.73 km (864.78 miles)

Statistics
- Crews: 70 at start

The 48º Rally RACC Catalunya – Costa Daurada, alternatively RACC Rally de España, was the thirteenth and the final round of the 2012 World Rally Championship season. The rally took place over 9–11 November, and was based in Salou, Catalonia, Spain. The rally was also the final round of the Super 2000 World Rally Championship, Production World Rally Championship and WRC Academy.

== Results ==
=== Event standings ===
Pos.	Driver	Co-driver	Car	Time	Difference	Points
Overall
1	(France) Sébastien Loeb	(Monaco) Daniel Elena	Citroën DS3 WRC	4:14:29.1	0.0	26
2	(Finland) Jari-Matti Latvala	(Finland) Miikka Anttila	Ford Fiesta RS WRC	4:14:36.1	7.0	21
3	(Finland) Mikko Hirvonen	(Finland) Jarmo Lehtinen	Citroën DS3 WRC	4:16:15.9	1:46.8	15
4	(Norway) Mads Østberg	(Sweden) Jonas Andersson	Ford Fiesta RS WRC	4:16:25.5	1:56.4	12
5	(Finland) Jarkko Nikara	(Finland) Jarkko Kalliolepo	Mini John Cooper Works WRC	4:30:37.0	16:07.9	10
6	(Republic of Ireland) Craig Breen	(Republic of Ireland) Paul Nagle	Ford Fiesta S2000	4:32:39.5	18:10.4	8
7	(Australia) Chris Atkinson	(Australia) Glenn MacNeall	Mini John Cooper Works WRC	4:33:43.8	19:14.7	6
8	(Sweden) Per-Gunnar Andersson	(Sweden) Emil Axelsson	Proton Satria Neo S2000	4:34:45.2	20:16.1	4
9	(Spain) Dani Sordo	(Spain) Carlos del Barrio	Mini John Cooper Works WRC	4:40:09.7	25:40.6	4
10	(Russia) Evgeny Novikov	(Austria) Ilka Minor	Ford Fiesta RS WRC	4:40:15.7	25:46.6	1
SWRC
1 (6)	(Republic of Ireland) Craig Breen	(Republic of Ireland) Paul Nagle	Ford Fiesta S2000	4:32:39.5	0.0	25
2 (8)	(Sweden) Per-Gunnar Andersson	(Sweden) Emil Axelsson	Proton Satria Neo S2000	4:34:45.2	2:05.7	18
3 (15)	(Saudi Arabia) Yazeed Al-Rajhi	(United Kingdom) Michael Orr	Ford Fiesta RRC	4:45:13.6	12:34.1	15
4 (17)	(United Kingdom) Alastair Fisher	(United Kingdom) Daniel Barritt	Proton Satria Neo S2000	4:46:08.8	13:29.3	12
5 (20)	(New Zealand) Hayden Paddon	(New Zealand) John Kennard	Škoda Fabia S2000	4:51:06.6	18:27.1	10
PWRC
1 (18)	(Mexico) Benito Guerra	(Spain) Borja Rozada	Mitsubishi Lancer Evo X	4:47:54.5	0.0	25
2 (22)	(Argentina) Marcos Ligato	(Argentina) Rubén García	Subaru Impreza WRX STi	4:53:30.8	5:36.3	18
3 (25)	(Indonesia) Subhan Aksa	(Australia) Bill Hayes	Mitsubishi Lancer Evo X	4:57:10.2	9:15.7	15
4 (27)	(Ukraine) Valeriy Gorban	(Ukraine) Andriy Nikolaev	Mitsubishi Lancer Evo IX	4:58:40.4	10:45.9	12
5 (29)	(Italy) Lorenzo Bertelli	(Italy) Lorenzo Granai	Subaru Impreza WRX STi	5:00:04.7	12:10.2	10
6 (31)	(Poland) Michał Kościuszko	(Poland) Maciej Szczepaniak	Mitsubishi Lancer Evo X	5:06:00.9	18:06.4	8
7 (33)	(Spain) Yeray Lemes	(Spain) Rogelio Peñate	Mitsubishi Lancer Evo X	5:08:28.9	20:34.4	6
8 (35)	(Mexico) Ricardo Triviño	(Spain) Àlex Haro	Subaru Impreza WRX STi	5:10:38.1	22:43.6	4
9 (36)	(Peru) Nicolás Fuchs	(Argentina) Fernando Mussano	Subaru Impreza WRX STi	5:11:14.5	23:20.0	2
10 (38)	(Italy) Gianluca Linari	(Italy) Andrea Cecchi	Subaru Impreza WRX STi	5:16:04.4	28:09.9	1
WRC Academy^{†}
1	(Spain) José Antonio Suárez	(Spain) Cándido Carrera	Ford Fiesta R2	3:46:51.3	0.0	26
2	(Sweden) Pontus Tidemand	(Norway) Stig Rune Skjærmoen	Ford Fiesta R2	3:48:11.0	1:19.7	25
3	(United Kingdom) Elfyn Evans	(United Kingdom) Philip Pugh	Ford Fiesta R2	3:50:13.6	3:22.3	18
4	(United Kingdom) John MacCrone	(United Kingdom) Stuart Loudon	Ford Fiesta R2	3:55:32.8	8:41.5	14
5	(Netherlands) Timo van der Marel	(Netherlands) Erwin Berkhof	Ford Fiesta R2	3:58:15.7	11:24.4	10
6	(Australia) Brendan Reeves	(Australia) Rhianon Smyth	Ford Fiesta R2	4:00:13.6	13:22.3	8
7	(Poland) Aron Domzala	(Poland) Kacper Pietrusinski	Ford Fiesta R2	4:12:29.4	25:38.1	—

- Note: ^† – The WRC Academy featured the first two legs of the rally.

=== Special stages ===
All dates and times are CET (UTC+1).

Leg	Stage	Time	Name	Length	Winner	Time	Avg. spd.	Rally leader
Leg 1 (9 Nov)	SS1	7:45	Gandesa	7.00 km	(Finland) Jari-Matti Latvala	4:40.5	89.84 km/h	(Finland) Jari-Matti Latvala
Leg 1 (9 Nov)	SS2	8:10	Pesells 1	26.59 km	(Estonia) Ott Tänak (Norway) Mads Østberg	15:54.5	100.29 km/h	(Estonia) Ott Tänak
Leg 1 (9 Nov)	SS3	9:19	Terra Alta 1	44.02 km	(France) Sébastien Loeb	30:37.3	86.25 km/h	(Norway) Mads Østberg
Leg 1 (9 Nov)	SS4	13:35	Pesells 2	26.59 km	(Russia) Evgeny Novikov	16:03.9	99.31 km/h	(Norway) Mads Østberg
Leg 1 (9 Nov)	SS5	14:44	Terra Alta 2	44.02 km	(France) Sébastien Loeb	31:19.0	84.34 km/h	(Norway) Mads Østberg
Leg 1 (9 Nov)	SS6	17:00	Salou	2.00 km	(Finland) Mikko Hirvonen	2:35.7	46.24 km/h	(Norway) Mads Østberg
Leg 2 (10 Nov)	SS7	8:00	La Mussara 1	20.48 km	(Finland) Jari-Matti Latvala	11:31.4	106.64 km/h	(Norway) Mads Østberg
Leg 2 (10 Nov)	SS8	9:15	El Priorat 1	45.97 km	(France) Sébastien Loeb	26:20.0	104.74 km/h	(France) Sébastien Loeb
Leg 2 (10 Nov)	SS9	10:26	Riba-roja d'Ebre 1	14.20 km	(France) Sébastien Loeb	9:19.1	91.43 km/h	(France) Sébastien Loeb
Leg 2 (10 Nov)	SS10	13:51	La Mussara 2	20.48 km	(Spain) Dani Sordo	11:23.2	107.92 km/h	(France) Sébastien Loeb
Leg 2 (10 Nov)	SS11	15:06	El Priorat 2	45.97 km	(Spain) Dani Sordo	25:52.7	106.58 km/h	(France) Sébastien Loeb
Leg 2 (10 Nov)	SS12	16:17	Riba-roja d'Ebre 2	14.20 km	(Estonia) Ott Tänak	9:32.0	89.37 km/h	(France) Sébastien Loeb
Leg 3 (11 Nov)	SS13	7:50	Riudecanyes 1	16.35 km	(Spain) Dani Sordo	10:33.9	92.85 km/h	(France) Sébastien Loeb
Leg 3 (11 Nov)	SS14	8:51	Santa Marina 1	26.51 km	(Spain) Dani Sordo	15:42.7	101.24 km/h	(France) Sébastien Loeb
Leg 3 (11 Nov)	SS15	9:47	La Serra d'Almos 1	4.11 km	(Spain) Dani Sordo	2:37.1	94.18 km/h	(France) Sébastien Loeb
Leg 3 (11 Nov)	SS16	11:52	Riudecanyes 2	16.35 km	(Finland) Jari-Matti Latvala	10:30.7	93.32 km/h	(France) Sébastien Loeb
Leg 3 (11 Nov)	SS17	12:53	Santa Marina 2 (Power stage)	26.51 km	(Finland) Jari-Matti Latvala	15:43.5	101.15 km/h	(France) Sébastien Loeb
Leg 3 (11 Nov)	SS18	13:49	La Serra d'Almos 2	4.11 km	(Spain) Dani Sordo	2:38.3	93.47 km/h	(France) Sébastien Loeb

=== Power stage ===
The Power stage was the penultimate stage of the rally, 26.51 kilometers long Santa Marina. Additional points were given to three fastest drivers through the stage.

Pos.	No.	Driver	Co-driver	Car	Class	Time	Difference	Avg. spd.	Points
1	3	(Finland) Jari-Matti Latvala	(Finland) Miikka Anttila	Ford Fiesta RS WRC	WRC	15:43.5	0.0	101.15 km/h	3
2	37	(Spain) Dani Sordo	(Spain) Carlos del Barrio	Mini John Cooper Works WRC	WRC	15:45.9	2.4	100.89 km/h	2
3	1	(France) Sébastien Loeb	(Monaco) Daniel Elena	Citroën DS3 WRC	WRC	15:54.2	10.7	100.02 km/h	1
