= 2012 Rallye Deutschland =

Motor rally competition

2012 Rallye Deutschland: 30. ADAC Rallye Deutschland
Round 9 of the 2012 World Rally Championship season
← Previous event	Next event →
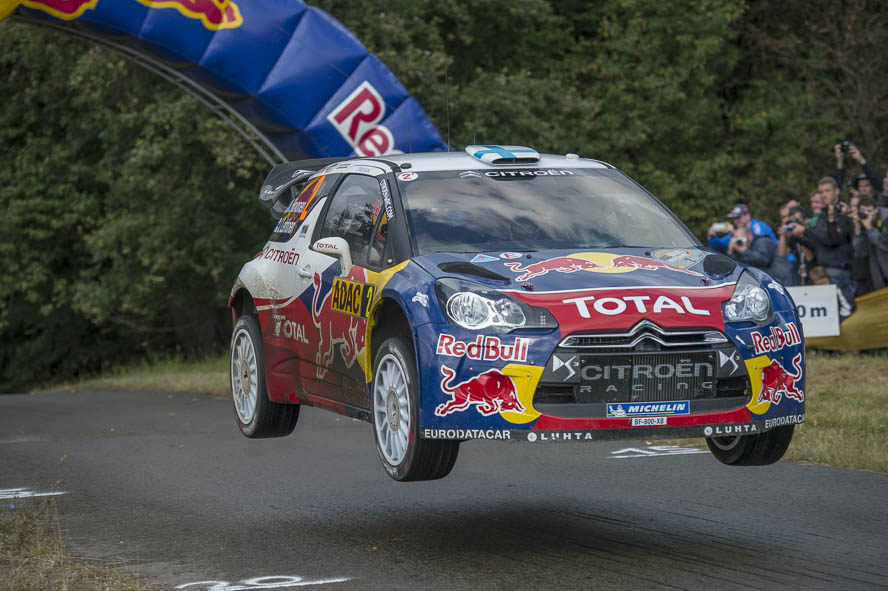
- Mikko Hirvonen during Rally with Jump
- Host country: Germany
- Rally base: Trier, Germany
- Held on: 24–26 August 2012
- Stages: 15 (368.63 km; 229.06 miles)
- Stage surface: Tarmac

Statistics
- Crews: 71 at start, 40 at finish

Overall results
- Overall winner: (France) Sébastien Loeb (France) Citroën Total World Rally Team

The 2012 Rallye Deutschland is the ninth round of the 2012 World Rally Championship season. Based in Trier, Rhineland-Palatinate, the event took place from 24–26 August. The rally was also the sixth round of the World Rally Championship for Production cars, and the fifth round of the World Rally Championship Academy.

== Results ==
=== Event standings ===
Pos.	Driver	Co-driver	Car	Time	Difference	Points
Overall
1.	(France) Sébastien Loeb	(Monaco) Daniel Elena	Citroën DS3 WRC	3:41:52.4	0.000	28
2.	(Finland) Jari-Matti Latvala	(Finland) Miikka Anttila	Ford Fiesta RS WRC	3:43:52.5	2:00.1	18
3.	(Finland) Mikko Hirvonen	(Finland) Jarmo Lehtinen	Citroën DS3 WRC	3:44:23.8	2:31.4	17
4.	(Norway) Mads Østberg	(Sweden) Jonas Andersson	Ford Fiesta RS WRC	3:45:16.8	3:24.4	12
5.	(Australia) Chris Atkinson	(Belgium) Stéphane Prevot	Mini John Cooper Works WRC	3:51:02.8	9:10.4	10
6.	(France) Sébastien Ogier	(France) Julien Ingrassia	Škoda Fabia S2000	3:51:43.2	9:50.8	8
7.	(Norway) Andreas Mikkelsen	(Norway) Ola Fløene	Škoda Fabia S2000	3:54:15.1	12:22.7	7
8.	(Qatar) Nasser Al-Attiyah	(Italy) Giovanni Bernacchini	Citroën DS3 WRC	3:54:42.8	12:50.4	4
9.	(Spain) Dani Sordo	(Spain) Carlos del Barrio	Mini John Cooper Works WRC	3:56:09.7	14:17.3	2
10.	(France) Mathieu Arzeno	(Belgium) Renaud Jamoul	Peugeot 207 S2000	3:57:12.1	15:20.1	1
PWRC
1. (13.)	(Poland) Michał Kościuszko	(Poland) Maciej Szczepaniak	Mitsubishi Lancer Evolution X	4:08:35.4	0.000	25
2. (16.)	(Mexico) Benito Guerra	(Spain) Borja Rozada	Mitsubishi Lancer Evolution X	4:10:35.9	2:00.5	18
3. (19.)	(Argentina) Marcos Ligato	(Argentina) Rubén García	Subaru Impreza WRX STI	4:18:37.2	10:01.8	15
4. (22.)	(Mexico) Ricardo Triviño	(Spain) Àlex Haro	Subaru Impreza WRX STI	4:24:10.5	15:35.1	12
5. (24.)	(Peru) Nicolás Fuchs	(Argentina) Fernando Mussano	Subaru Impreza WRX STI	4:26:19.0	17:43.6	10
6. (28.)	(Indonesia) Subhan Aksa	(Australia) Jeff Judd	Mitsubishi Lancer Evolution X	4:35:35.0	23:59.6	8
WRC Academy^{†}
1.	(United Kingdom) Elfyn Evans	(United Kingdom) Philip Pugh	Ford Fiesta R2	1:34:34.2	0.000	25
2.	(Spain) José Antonio Suárez	(Spain) Cándido Carrera	Ford Fiesta R2	1:34:44.1	0:09.9	18
3.	(Australia) Brendan Reeves	(Australia) Rhianon Smyth	Ford Fiesta R2	1:35:29.3	0:55.1	15
4.	(United Kingdom) Alastair Fisher	(United Kingdom) Daniel Barritt	Ford Fiesta R2	1:36:05.3	1:31.1	12
5.	(United Kingdom) John MacCrone	(United Kingdom) Stuart Loudon	Ford Fiesta R2	1:36:07.6	1:33.4	10
6.	(Netherlands) Timo van der Marel	(Netherlands) Erwin Berkhof	Ford Fiesta R2	1:36:30.9	1:56.7	8

Notes

- ^† — The WRC Academy only competes on the first two days of the rally.

=== Special stages ===
All dates and times are CEST (UTC+2).

Leg	Stage	Time	Name	Length	Winner	Time	Avg. spd.	Rally leader
Leg 1 (24 Aug)	SS1	10:48	Mittelmosel 1	24.90 km	(France) Sébastien Loeb	14:42.9	101.53 km/h	(France) Sébastien Loeb
Leg 1 (24 Aug)	SS2	11:36	Moselland 1	22.79 km	(France) Sébastien Loeb	14:19.7	95.43 km/h	(France) Sébastien Loeb
Leg 1 (24 Aug)	SS3	12:29	Grafschaft 1	21.23 km	(France) Sébastien Loeb	12:19.5	103.35 km/h	(France) Sébastien Loeb
Leg 1 (24 Aug)	SS4	16:17	Mittelmosel 2	24.90 km	(Finland) Jari-Matti Latvala	14:31.7	102.83 km/h	(France) Sébastien Loeb
Leg 1 (24 Aug)	SS5	17:05	Moselland 2	22.79 km	(France) Sébastien Loeb	14:09.9	96.53 km/h	(France) Sébastien Loeb
Leg 1 (24 Aug)	SS6	17:58	Grafschaft 2	21.23 km	(Finland) Jari-Matti Latvala	12:12.2	104.38 km/h	(France) Sébastien Loeb
Leg 2 (25 Aug)	SS7	7:58	Stein and Wein 1	26.54 km	(France) Sébastien Loeb	15:25.2	103.27 km/h	(France) Sébastien Loeb
Leg 2 (25 Aug)	SS8	9:01	Peterberg 1	9.37 km	(Spain) Dani Sordo	5:51.3	96.02 km/h	(France) Sébastien Loeb
Leg 2 (25 Aug)	SS9	10:57	Arena Panzerplatte 1	46.54 km	(France) Sébastien Loeb	27:31.9	101.43 km/h	(France) Sébastien Loeb
Leg 2 (25 Aug)	SS10	14:48	Stein and Wein 2	26.54 km	(Estonia) Ott Tänak	15:12.1	104.75 km/h	(France) Sébastien Loeb
Leg 2 (25 Aug)	SS11	15:51	Peterberg 2	9.37 km	(Estonia) Ott Tänak	5:31.5	101.76 km/h	(France) Sébastien Loeb
Leg 2 (25 Aug)	SS12	17:47	Arena Panzerplatte 2	46.54 km	(France) Sébastien Loeb	26:54.0	103.80 km/h	(France) Sébastien Loeb
Day 3 (26 August)	SS13	9:13	Dhrontal 1	30.76 km	(France) Sébastien Loeb	19:45.6	93.44 km/h	(France) Sébastien Loeb
Day 3 (26 August)	SS14	11:36	Dhrontal 2	30.76 km	(Norway) Petter Solberg	19:40.3	93.84 km/h	(France) Sébastien Loeb
Day 3 (26 August)	SS15	13:21	SSS Circus Maximus Trier	4.37 km	(France) Sébastien Loeb	3:24.8	77.11 km/h	(France) Sébastien Loeb

=== Power stage ===
The Power stage was a short 4.37 km stage run through the streets of Trier known as the Circus Maximus. The three fastest crews through this stage were awarded by drivers' championship points. Sébastien Loeb was the fastest driver through the stage, earning three additional championship points. His teammate, Mikko Hirvonen was second, while Volkswagen Motorsport driver Andreas Mikkelsen finished third. The single point Mikkelsen earned marked the first time a S2000 car scored points on a Power stage.

Pos.	No.	Driver	Co-driver	Car	Class	Time	Difference	Avg. spd.	Points
1	1	(France) Sébastien Loeb	(Monaco) Daniel Elena	Citroën DS3 WRC	WRC	3:24.8	0.000	77.11 km/h	3
2	2	(Finland) Mikko Hirvonen	(Finland) Jarmo Lehtinen	Citroën DS3 WRC	WRC	3:27.0	2.2	76.00 km/h	2
3	23	(Norway) Andreas Mikkelsen	(Norway) Ola Fløene	Škoda Fabia S2000	Super 2000	3:31.7	6.9	74.55 km/h	1
