= 2012 Monte Carlo Rally =

Car rally

2012 Monte Carlo Rally 80ème Rallye Automobile de Monte-Carlo
Round 1 of the 2012 World Rally Championship season
Next event →
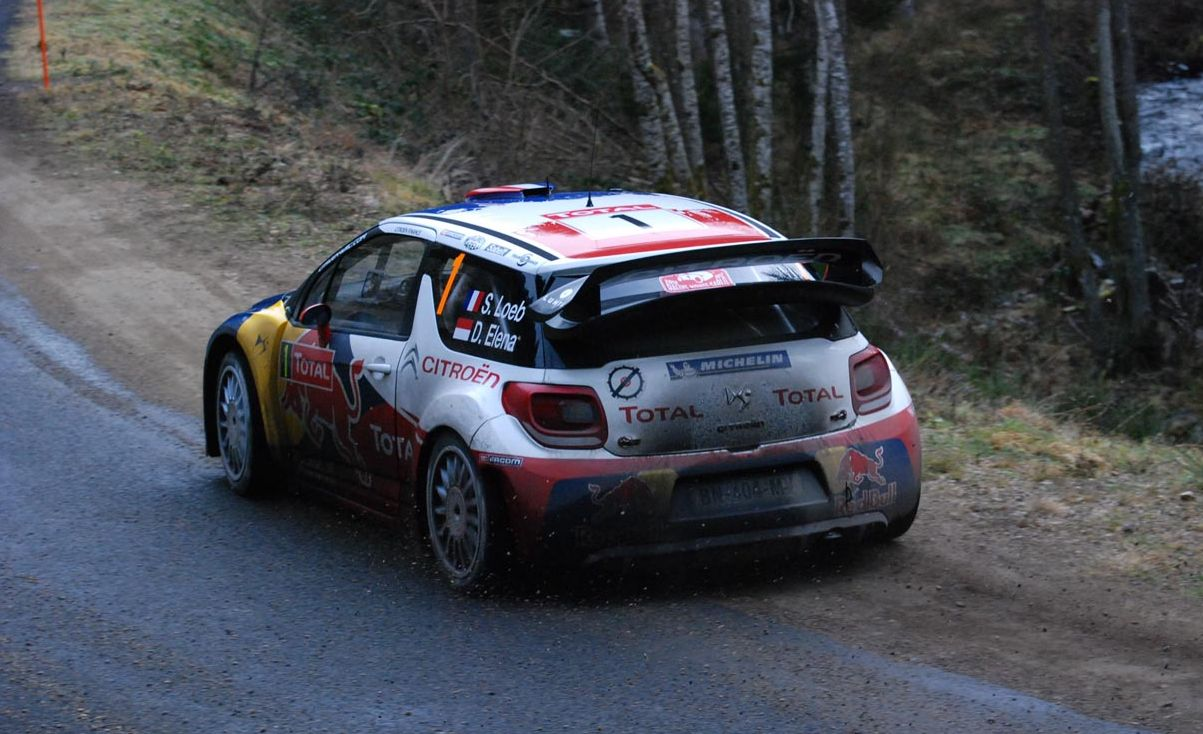
- Sébastien Loeb during Rally
- Host country: Monaco
- Rally base: Monte Carlo
- Dates run: January 18 – 22 2012
- Stages: 18 (433.36 km; 269.28 miles)
- Stage surface: Tarmac and snow
- Overall distance: 1,772.52 km (1,101.39 miles)

Statistics
- Crews: 82 at start, 54 at finish

Overall results
- Overall winner: (France) Sébastien Loeb (France) Citroën Total WRT

The 2012 Monte Carlo Rally, officially 80ème Rallye Automobile de Monte-Carlo was the first round of the 2012 World Rally Championship (WRC) season. The rally took place between 18 and 22 January 2012.

== Report ==
=== Introduction ===
The rally, which returned to the WRC calendar after a three-year absence, started in Valence on Wednesday 18 January and covered over 1,339 kilometres (832.0 mi), including 433 kilometres (269.1 mi) of special stages. Stages were run in both daylight and at night, and the route included two passes through the famous Col de Turini stage on Saturday. The rally became the first in the modern era of the sport to be held over the course of five days. 82 entries were registered for the event.

=== Leg One (18 January) ===
2011 World Champion Sébastien Loeb took an early lead when he won the first stage of the rally, Le Moulinon–Antraigues. However, icy conditions on the second stage, Burzet–St Martial meant that Ford driver Jari-Matti Latvala took the lead when he adopted an unorthodox tyre strategy, using super-soft and studded tyres on opposite corners of his car. By the end of the stage, Latvala had established a thirty-second lead over Loeb. Latvala's lead was short-lived, as he crashed out on the second running of Burzet–St Martial when he missed a pace note warning that a corner tightened on entry. His car fell over a short drop, but could not be retrieved. Ford later confirmed that Latvala had retired from the rally, as the event was not run to "Rally 2" – formerly super-rally – regulations which would normally allow Latvala to restart the rally the next day.

Latvala's accident meant that Loeb reclaimed the lead of the rally, one minute ahead of Mini's Dani Sordo and Petter Solberg in the second works Ford Fiesta. Sébastien Ogier finished the day fourth in his Škoda Fabia S2000, which he credited to the mixed conditions minimising the differences in performance between the WRC and Super 2000 cars. Evgeny Novikov was fifth, the first of the privateer WRC cars.

=== Leg Two (19 January) ===
The second day of competition saw the running of six special stages, five of which were won by Loeb; Sordo won the second run over Labatie D'Andaure–Lalouvesc. Ogier crashed out of the rally on the final stage of the day, the second pass over Lamastre–Gilhoc–Alboussière. Ogier had been running sixth at the time of the accident. His co-driver, Julien Ingrassia, injured his arm in the crash, though the exact extent of his injuries was not revealed except to say that it was "not broken".

At the end of the second day, Loeb's lead over Sordo was one minute and thirty-seven seconds, with third-placed Solberg a further three seconds behind. Ford team principal Malcolm Wilson admitted that he felt Solberg was being "too conservative" with the car and encouraged him to chase Sordo as it was more important for Solberg to become familiar with the car's abilities than it was to score manufacturer points. Loeb's team-mate Mikko Hirvonen was a further two minutes behind Solberg, holding a narrow lead over Novikov.

== Results ==
=== Event standings ===
| Pos. | Driver | Co-driver | Car | Time | Difference | Points |
Overall
| 1. | (France) Sébastien Loeb | (Monaco) Daniel Elena | Citroën DS3 WRC | 4:32:39.9 | 0.0 | 28 |
| 2. | (Spain) Dani Sordo | (Spain) Carlos del Barrio | Mini John Cooper Works WRC | 4:35:25.4 | 2:45.5 | 18 |
| 3. | (Norway) Petter Solberg | (United Kingdom) Chris Patterson | Ford Fiesta RS WRC | 4:35:54.1 | 3:14.2 | 15 |
| 4. | (Finland) Mikko Hirvonen | (Finland) Jarmo Lehtinen | Citroën DS3 WRC | 4:36:46.7 | 4:06.8 | 14 |
| 5. | (Russia) Evgeny Novikov | (France) Denis Giraudet | Ford Fiesta RS WRC | 4:38:43.3 | 6:03.4 | 11 |
| 6. | (France) François Delecour | (France) Dominique Savignoni | Ford Fiesta RS WRC | 4:40:27.8 | 7:47.9 | 8 |
| 7. | (France) Pierre Campana | (France) Sabrina de Castelli | Mini John Cooper Works WRC | 4:41:11.3 | 8:31.4 | 6 |
| 8. | (Estonia) Ott Tänak | (Estonia) Kuldar Sikk | Ford Fiesta RS WRC | 4:43:14.5 | 10:34.6 | 4 |
| 9. | (Czech Republic) Martin Prokop | (Czech Republic) Zdeněk Hrůza | Ford Fiesta RS WRC | 4:48:50.6 | 16:10.7 | 2 |
| 10. | (Portugal) Armindo Araújo | (Portugal) Miguel Ramalho | Mini John Cooper Works WRC | 4:48:56.5 | 16:16.6 | 1 |
| 11. | (United Kingdom) Matthew Wilson | (United Kingdom) Scott Martin | Ford Fiesta RS WRC | 4:51:30.9 | +18:51.0 | 0 |
| 12. | (Netherlands) Kevin Abbring | (Belgium) Lara Vanneste | Škoda Fabia S2000 | 4:51:36.2 | +18:56.3 | - |
| 13. | (Norway) Henning Solberg | (Norway) | Ford Fiesta RS WRC | 4:52:56.2 | +20:16.3 | - |
| 14. | (Republic of Ireland) Craig Breen | (United Kingdom) Gareth Roberts | Ford Fiesta S2000 | 4:57:06.2 | +5:30.0 | 25* |
| 15. | (France) Bryan Bouffier | (France) Xavier Panseri | Peugeot 207 S2000 | 5:00:05.3 | +8:29.1 | - |
S2000 / SWRC
| 1. (12.) | (Netherlands) Kevin Abbring | (Belgium) Lara Vanneste | Škoda Fabia S2000 | 4:51:36.2 | 0.0 | - |
| 2. (14.) | (Republic of Ireland) Craig Breen | (United Kingdom) Gareth Roberts | Ford Fiesta S2000 | 4:57:06.2 | +5:30.0 | 25* |
| 3. (15.) | (France) Bryan Bouffier | (France) Xavier Panseri | Peugeot 207 S2000 | 5:00:05.3 | +8:29.1 | - |
Production Class 4 / PWRC
| 1. (18.) | (Switzerland) Olivier Burri | (Switzerland) Jean-Jacques Ferrero | Mitsubishi Lancer Evo X | 5:08:10.4 | 0.0 | -** |
| 2. (25.) | (France) Richard Frau | (France) Frédéric Vauclare | Mitsubishi Lancer Evo X | 5:21:55.6 | +13:45.2 | -** |
| 3. (27.) | (France) Stéphane Cornu | (France) Fabrice Nedel | Renault Mégane RS | 5:24:15.6 | +16:05.2 | -** |
| 4. (28.) | (France) Jerôme Aymard | (France) Sandrine Aymard | Subaru Impreza WRX STi | 5:27:11.8 | +19:01.4 | -** |
| 5. (30.) | (Poland) Michał Kościuszko | (Poland) Maciek Szczepaniak | Mitsubishi Lancer Evo X | 5:35:14.8 | +27:04.4 | 25 |
Production Class 8 / PWRC
| 1. (42.) | (Czech Republic) Martin Rada | (Czech Republic) Jaroslav Jugas | Alfa Romeo 147 | 5:48:32.2 | 0.0 | -** |
| 2. (54.) | (United Kingdom) Louise Cook | (United Kingdom) Stefan Davis | Ford Fiesta ST | 7:02:39.6 | +1:14:07.4 | 18 |

* Only team eligible for SWRC points that was classified.

** These teams do not score points in PWRC.

=== Special stages ===
| Day | Stage | Time (UTC+1) | Name | Length | Winner | Time | Avg. spd. | Rally leader |
|---|---|---|---|---|---|---|---|---|
| Leg 1 (18 Jan) | SS1 | 9:03 | Le Moulinon – Antraigues 1 | 36.87 km | (France) Sébastien Loeb | 24:04.0 | 91.92 km/h | (France) Sébastien Loeb |
| Leg 1 (18 Jan) | SS2 | 10:21 | Burzet – St Martial 1 | 30.48 km | (Finland) Jari-Matti Latvala | 21:28.2 | 85.18 km/h | (Finland) Jari-Matti Latvala |
| Leg 1 (18 Jan) | SS3 | 14:21 | Le Moulinon – Antraigues 2 | 36.87 km | (France) Sébastien Loeb | 23:47.0 | 93.01 km/h | (Finland) Jari-Matti Latvala |
| Leg 1 (18 Jan) | SS4 | 16:20 | Burzet – St Martial 2 | 30.48 km | (France) Sébastien Loeb | 20:18.2 | 90.07 km/h | (France) Sébastien Loeb |
| Leg 2 (19 Jan) | SS5 | 9:33 | Labatie D'Andaure – Lalouvesc 1 | 19.00 km | (France) Sébastien Loeb | 11:22.5 | 100.22 km/h | (France) Sébastien Loeb |
| Leg 2 (19 Jan) | SS6 | 10:14 | St. Bonnet – St. Julien Molhesabate – St. Bonnet 1 | 25.22 km | (France) Sébastien Loeb | 12:37.7 | 119.83 km/h | (France) Sébastien Loeb |
| Leg 2 (19 Jan) | SS7 | 11:37 | Lamastre – Gilhoc – Alboussière 1 | 21.66 km | (France) Sébastien Loeb | 13:41.8 | 94.88 km/h | (France) Sébastien Loeb |
| Leg 2 (19 Jan) | SS8 | 14:50 | Labatie D'Andaure – Lalouvesc 2 | 19.00 km | (Spain) Dani Sordo | 11:14.9 | 101.35 km/h | (France) Sébastien Loeb |
| Leg 2 (19 Jan) | SS9 | 15:31 | St. Bonnet – St. Julien Molhesabate – St. Bonnet 2 | 25.22 km | (France) Sébastien Loeb | 12:29.6 | 121.12 km/h | (France) Sébastien Loeb |
| Leg 2 (19 Jan) | SS10 | 16:54 | Lamastre – Gilhoc – Alboussière 2 | 21.66 km | (France) Sébastien Loeb | 14:00.6 | 92.76 km/h | (France) Sébastien Loeb |
| Leg 3 (20 Jan) | SS11 | 10:02 | St-Jean-en-Royans – Font d'Urle | 23.28 km | (Norway) Petter Solberg | 12:08.6 | 115.03 km/h | (France) Sébastien Loeb |
| Leg 3 (20 Jan) | SS12 | 10:43 | Cimetiere de Vassieux – Col de Gaudissart | 24.13 km | (Finland) Mikko Hirvonen | 15:47.7 | 91.66 km/h | (France) Sébastien Loeb |
| Leg 3 (20 Jan) | SS13 | 15:11 | Montauban-sur-l'Ouvèze – Eygalayes | 29.89 km | (Finland) Mikko Hirvonen | 17:08.7 | 104.60 km/h | (France) Sébastien Loeb |
| Leg 4 (21 Jan) | SS14 | 15:11 | Moulinet – La Bollène Vésubie 1 | 23.41 km | (Finland) Mikko Hirvonen | 15:38.4 | 89.81 km/h | (France) Sébastien Loeb |
| Leg 4 (21 Jan) | SS15 | 15:54 | Lantosque – Lucéram 1 | 18.81 km | (Norway) Petter Solberg | 12:57.0 | 87.15 km/h | (France) Sébastien Loeb |
| Leg 4 (21 Jan) | SS16 | 19:34 | Moulinet – La Bollène Vésubie 2 | 23.41 km | (Norway) Petter Solberg | 15:45.5 | 89.13 km/h | (France) Sébastien Loeb |
| Leg 4 (21 Jan) | SS17 | 21:17 | Lantosque – Lucéram 2 | 18.81 km | (Norway) Petter Solberg | 13:05.8 | 86.17 km/h | (France) Sébastien Loeb |
| Leg 5 (22 Jan) | SS18 | 10:11 | Ste Agnès – Col de la Madone (Power stage) | 5.16 km | (France) Sébastien Loeb | 3:27.8 | 89.39 km/h | (France) Sébastien Loeb |

=== Power Stage ===
The "Power stage" was a 5.16 km (3.21 mi) stage at the end of the rally, held between Ste-Agnes and Col de la Madone.

| Pos | Driver | Time | Diff. | Avg. speed | Points |
|---|---|---|---|---|---|
| 1 | (France) Sébastien Loeb | 3:27.8 | 0.0 | 89.39 km/h | 3 |
| 2 | (Finland) Mikko Hirvonen | 3:29.0 | +1.2 | 88.88 km/h | 2 |
| 3 | (Russia) Evgeny Novikov | 3:30.4 | +2.6 | 88.29 km/h | 1 |
