= Ford Fiesta RS WRC =

World Rally Car

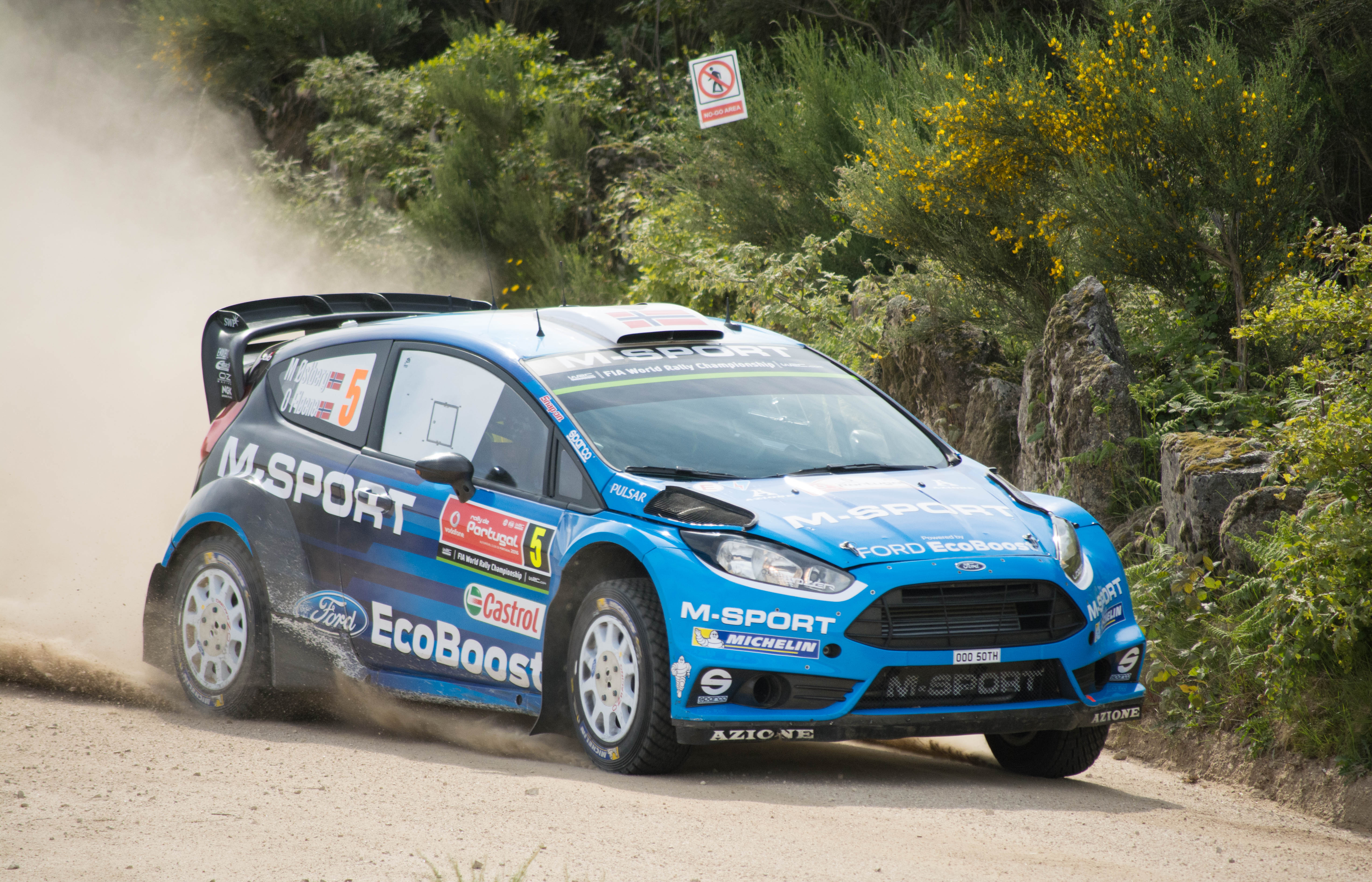
- Mads Østberg driving his Ford Fiesta RS WRC at the 2016 Rally de Portugal.
- Category: World Rally Car
- Constructor: Ford Europe/M-Sport
- Designer: Christian Loriaux
- Predecessor: Ford Focus RS WRC
- Successor: Ford Fiesta WRC

Technical specifications
- Chassis: Reinforced body with welded, multi-point roll cage
- Length: 3,963 mm (156.0 in)
- Width: 1,820 mm (72 in)
- Wheelbase: 2,480 mm (98 in)
- Engine: Ford EcoBoost engine 1.6 L (98 cu in) 4-cylinder, 16-valve turbocharged
- Transmission: 6-speed M-Sport / X-Trac six-speed semi-automatic transmission gearbox with hydraulic shift
- Weight: 1,200 kg (2,646 lb)
- Tyres: Michelin; Pirelli; DMACK

Competition history (WRC)
- Notable entrants: (United Kingdom) M-Sport World Rally Team (Czech Republic) Jipocar Czech National Team (United Kingdom) DMACK World Rally Team (Netherlands) Ferm Power Tools World Rally Team (United Kingdom) Ford World Rally Team; Qatar World Rally Team (Norway) Adapta World Rally Team
- Notable drivers: (Norway) Mads Østberg (Czech Republic) Martin Prokop (Poland) Robert Kubica (Wales) Elfyn Evans (Italy) Lorenzo Bertelli (Estonia) Ott Tänak (France) Eric Camilli (Norway) Henning Solberg (Saudi Arabia) Yazeed Al-Rajhi (Belgium) Thierry Neuville (Finland) Juho Hänninen (Finland) Mikko Hirvonen (Finland) Jari-Matti Latvala (Norway) Petter Solberg (United Arab Emirates) Khalid Al Qassimi (Russia) Evgeny Novikov (Qatar) Nasser al-Attiyah (United States) Ken Block (Argentina) Federico Villagra (Netherlands) Dennis Kuipers
- Debut: 2011 Rally Sweden
- First win: 2011 Rally Sweden
- Last win: (United Kingdom) 2012 Wales Rally GB
Wins
6

The Ford Fiesta RS WRC is the World Rally Car built for the Ford World Rally Team by Ford Europe and M-Sport for use in the World Rally Championship 2011–2016. It is based upon the Ford Fiesta road car, and replaced the Ford Focus RS WRC, which competed in various versions since 1999. It is also built to the new World Rally Car regulations for 2011, which are based upon the existing Super 2000 regulations, but is powered by a turbocharged 1.6-litre engine (1.6 L turbo Ford EcoBoost engine) rather than the normally aspirated 2-litre engine found in Super 2000 cars. M-Sport and Ford introduced a Super 2000 version of the Ford Fiesta at the beginning of 2010, which forms the base of the WRC car.

Stobart Ford World Rally Team drivers Matthew Wilson and Henning Solberg have carried out much of the development work on the car during 2010, with Per-Gunnar Andersson and M-Sport managing director and Ford team director Malcolm Wilson have also driven the car.

From 2017 onwards, it was replaced by the Ford Fiesta WRC, but some private owners still enter this car to participate in rally competitions.

== WRC victories (Fiesta RS WRC) ==
No.	Event	Season	Surface	Driver	Co-driver
1	2011 Rally Sweden	2011	Snow	(Finland) Mikko Hirvonen	(Finland) Jarmo Lehtinen
2	2011 Rally Australia	2011	Gravel	(Finland) Mikko Hirvonen	(Finland) Jarmo Lehtinen
3	(United Kingdom) 2011 Wales Rally GB	2011	Gravel	(Finland) Jari-Matti Latvala	(Finland) Miikka Anttila
4	2012 Rally Sweden	2012	Snow	(Finland) Jari-Matti Latvala	(Finland) Miikka Anttila
5	2012 Rally de Portugal	2012	Gravel	(Norway) Mads Østberg	(Sweden) Jonas Andersson
6	(United Kingdom) 2012 Wales Rally GB	2012	Gravel	(Finland) Jari-Matti Latvala	(Finland) Miikka Anttila

== RRC version ==
In 2012, the RRC version of the Fiesta was launched to comply with the regional rally rules of the FIA; it is basically a Fiesta RS WRC, only with an S2000-specification rear wing, a slightly different front bumper, a lighter flywheel and a 30mm restrictor instead of a 33mm one found in the WRC variant. The Fiesta's with RRC specification can be converted to WRC specification in 6 hours.

=== WRC-2 victories (Fiesta RRC) ===
No.	Event	Season	Driver	Co-driver
1	2013 Rally Sweden	2013	(Saudi Arabia) Yazeed Al Rajhi	(United Kingdom) Michael Orr
2	(Mexico) 2013 Rally México	2013	(Qatar) Abdulaziz Al-Kuwari	(Republic of Ireland) Killian Duffy
3	2013 Rally Argentina	2013	(Qatar) Abdulaziz Al-Kuwari	(Republic of Ireland) Killian Duffy
4	2013 Rally Australia	2013	(Qatar) Abdulaziz Al-Kuwari	(Republic of Ireland) Killian Duffy
5	2014 Rally de Portugal	2014	(Qatar) Nasser Al-Attiyah	(Italy) Giovanni Bernacchini
6	2014 Rally Argentina	2014	(Qatar) Nasser Al-Attiyah	(Italy) Giovanni Bernacchini
7	2014 Rally Australia	2014	(Qatar) Nasser Al-Attiyah	(Italy) Giovanni Bernacchini
8	(Spain) 2014 Rally Catalunya	2014	(Qatar) Nasser Al-Attiyah	(Italy) Giovanni Bernacchini
9	(Mexico) 2015 Rally México	2015	(Qatar) Nasser Al-Attiyah	(France) Matthieu Baumel
10	2015 Rally Argentina	2015	(Qatar) Abdulaziz Al-Kuwari	(United Kingdom) Marshall Clarke
11	2015 Rally de Portugal	2015	(Qatar) Nasser Al-Attiyah	(France) Matthieu Baumel
12	(Italy) 2015 Rally Italia Sardegna	2015	(Ukraine) Yuriy Protasov	(Ukraine) Pavlo Cherepin
13	2015 Rally Australia	2015	(Qatar) Nasser Al-Attiyah	(France) Matthieu Baumel
14	(France) 2015 Tour de Corse	2015	(France) Julien Maurin	(France) Nicolas Klinger

== Ford Fiesta RS WRC 'Evolution' ==
In Rally Finland 2014 M-Sport launched a facelifted version of the Fiesta RS WRC. Despite the change on the front of the car, it's still the same under the bonnet. M-Sport later revealed the 'Evolution' version would come in 2015.

Before Rally Portugal 2015, M-Sport launched the 'Evolution' specification of the Fiesta RS WRC. Unlike the first version's engine which was built by Pipo Motors, the new Fiesta RS WRC's engine is completely built by M-Sport, with technical support from Ford. The car has also undergone a full redesign under the bonnet with further developments to the cooling package, transmission, electronics, wiring harness and differentials.

== See also ==
- Citroën DS3 WRC
- Citroën C3 WRC
- Hyundai i20 WRC
- Hyundai i20 Coupe WRC
- Mini John Cooper Works WRC
- Toyota Yaris WRC
- Volkswagen Polo R WRC
