= Evgenij Novikov =

Russian rally driver (born 1990)

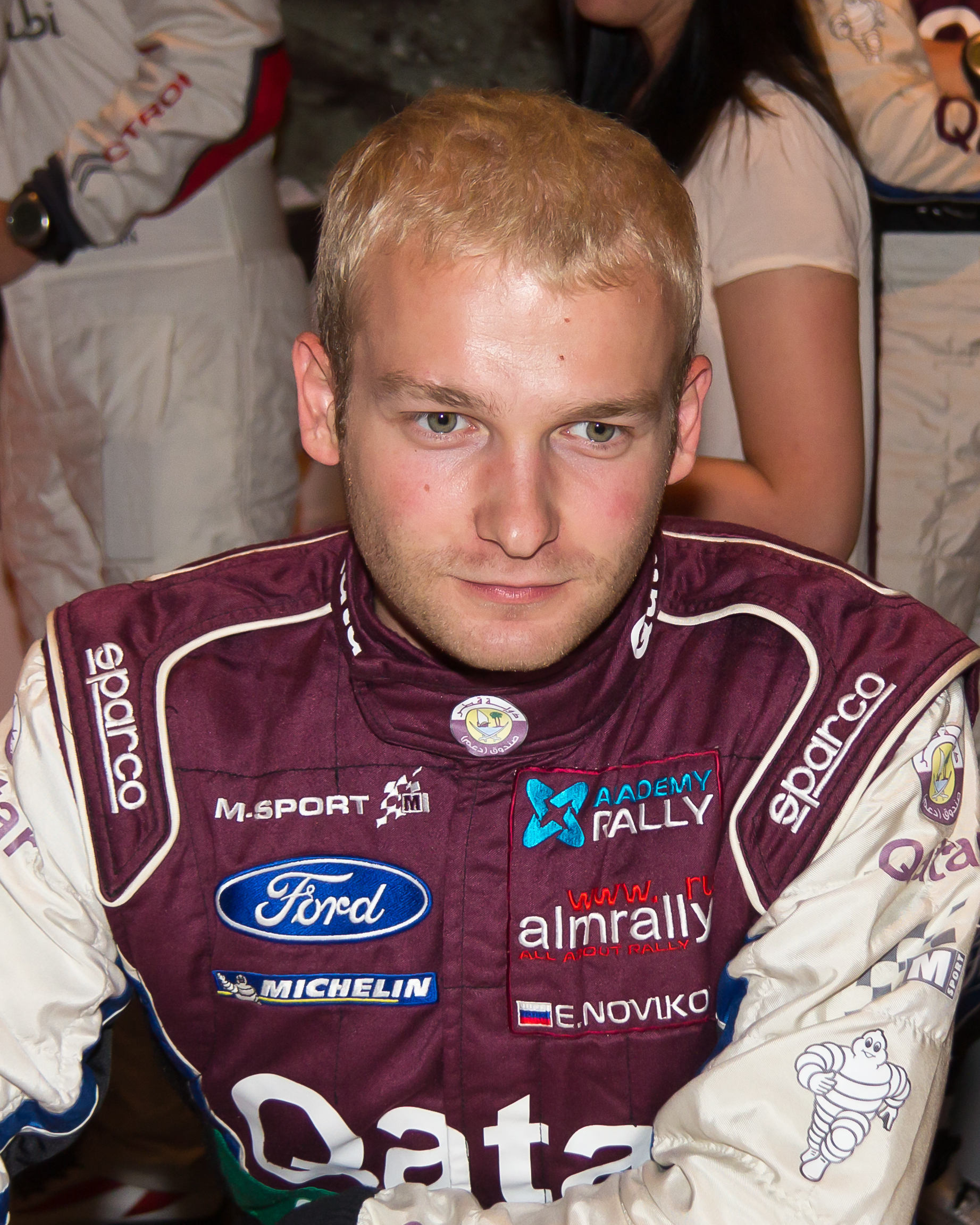
- Novikov at the 2013 Rallye Deutschland

Personal information
- Nationality: (Russia) Russian
- Full name: Evgeny Maksimovich Novikov
- Born: 19 September 1990 (age 36); Moscow, Russian SFSR, Soviet Union

World Rally Championship record
- Years active: 2007–2009, 2011–2013
- Co-driver: (Russia) Alexey Aksakov (Russia) Dmitriy Chumak (Australia) Dale Moscatt (Belgium) Stéphane Prévot (France) Denis Giraudet (France) Nicolas Klinger (Austria) Ilka Minor
- Teams: Citroën Junior Team, Stobart Ford, Team Abu Dhabi
- Rallies: 49
- Championships: 0
- Rally wins: 0
- Podiums: 2
- Stage wins: 15
- Total points: 173
- First rally: 2007 Wales Rally GB
- Last rally: 2013 Wales Rally GB

Evgenij Maksimovich Novikov (Russian: Евгений Максимович Новиков, romanized: Yevgeniy Maksimovich Novikov; born 19 September 1990) is a Russian former rally driver who competed in the World Rally Championship from 2007 to 2013.

== Career ==
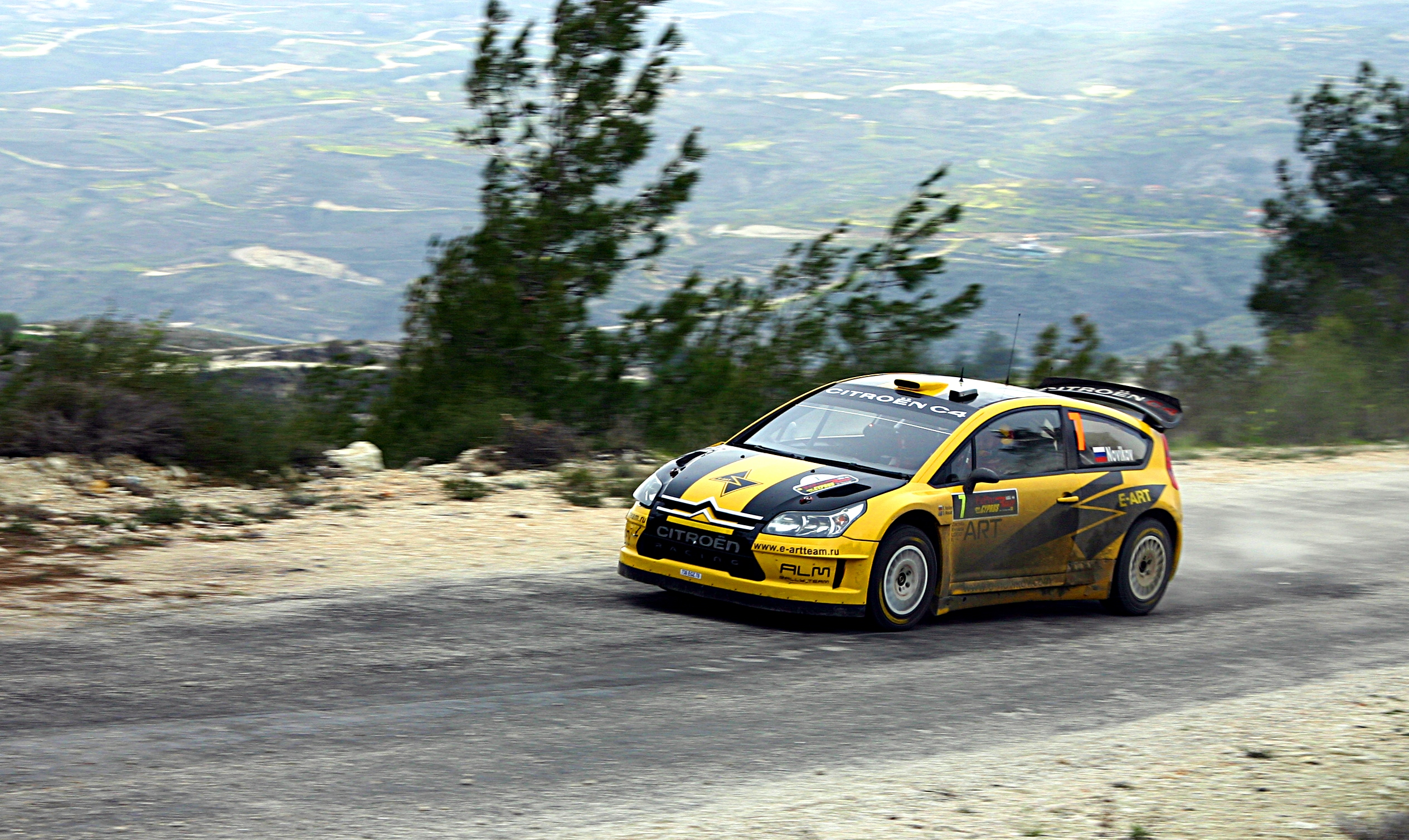
Novikov driving a Citroën C4 WRC at the 2009 Cyprus Rally

Born in Moscow, Novikov won the Russian Rally Cup in 2006 and finished runner-up in both Estonian and Russian national championships in 2007. The 2007 season also saw him debut in the World Rally Championship at the season-ending 2007 Wales Rally GB.

In the 2008 season, Novikov contested a full six-event Production World Rally Championship programme as the series' youngest driver. He retired in four rallies and collected his only PWRC points at the Rally Japan, where he impressively led the category until suspension problems on the last stage dropped him narrowly behind Juho Hänninen. He still managed to stay 2.9 seconds ahead of Toshi Arai and with the eight points for the second place, he placed 13th in the championship standings.

For the 2009 season, Novikov was signed by the debuting Citroën Junior Team, Citroën Total's satellite team. With Sébastien Ogier and Conrad Rautenbach as his teammates, he will drove the Citroën C4 WRC in at least eight of the twelve rallies. He scored his first WRC points with a fifth place at the Rally d'Italia Sardegna, and his first stage win in the following event, the Acropolis Rally in Greece. He became both the first Russian and the youngest-ever driver to top the time sheets in the series.

After one year off from competition, Novikov returned to the World Rally Championship partway through in the 2011 season, making his first appearance at the Rally Mexico in a Stobart M-Sport-prepared Ford. He competed in eight of the thirteen rallies, scoring twelve points over the course of the season to finish the year seventeenth overall.

In 2012, Novikov joined M-Sport full-time. He scored his first podium at the 2012 Rally de Portugal, finishing third overall. He was promoted to second place when Citroën driver Mikko Hirvonen was excluded from the results.

For the 2013 season, Novikov joined the Qatar M-Sport WRT alongside Mads Østberg.

At the beginning of the 2013 Acropolis Rally, Novikov was the early leader after winning the first 2 stages and had a 40-second lead over Jari-Matti Latvala after stage 3. A puncture dropped him down to eighth and ruled him out for his maiden win, Latvala eventually won the rally.

Novikov failed to secure a drive for the 2014 season.

== Complete WRC results ==
Year	Entrant	Car	1	2	3	4	5	6	7	8	9	10	11	12	13	14	15	16	WDC	Points
2007	Evgeny Novikov	Subaru Impreza WRX STi	MON	SWE	NOR	MEX	POR	ARG	ITA	GRE	FIN	GER	NZL	ESP	FRA	JPN	IRE	GBR; Ret	NC	0
2008	Evgeny Novikov	Subaru Impreza WRX STi	MON	SWE	MEX	ARG; Ret	JOR	ITA											NC	0
2008	Evgeny Novikov	Mitsubishi Lancer Evo IX							GRE; 35	TUR; Ret	FIN	GER	NZL; Ret	ESP	FRA	JPN; 11	GBR; Ret		NC	0
2009	Citroën Junior Team	Citroën C4 WRC	IRE	NOR; 11	CYP; Ret	POR; Ret	ARG	ITA; 5	GRE; 15	POL; 9	FIN; Ret	AUS	ESP; Ret	GBR					13th	4
2011	M-Sport Stobart	Ford Fiesta RS WRC	SWE	MEX; Ret	POR	JOR	ITA; 14	ARG	GRE; 20	FIN; Ret	GER	AUS; Ret	FRA; 24						17th	12
2011	ALM Russia	Citroën DS3 WRC												ESP; 7					17th	12
2011	Team Abu Dhabi	Ford Fiesta RS WRC													GBR; 7				17th	12
2012	M-Sport	Ford Fiesta RS WRC	MON; 5	SWE; 5	MEX; Ret	POR; 2	ARG; 8	GRE; Ret	NZL; 4	FIN; 36	GER; Ret	GBR; 6	FRA; 7	ITA; 2	ESP; 10				6th	88
2013	Qatar M-Sport	Ford Fiesta RS WRC	MON; Ret	SWE; 9	MEX; 10	POR; 4	ARG; 4	GRE; 9	ITA; Ret	FIN; 6	GER; 9	AUS; 7	FRA; 5	ESP; 5	GBR; 19				7th	69

=== PWRC results ===
Year	Entrant	Car	1	2	3	4	5	6	7	8	Pos.	Points
2008	Evgeny Novikov	Subaru Impreza WRX STi	SWE	ARG; Ret							13th	8
2008	Evgeny Novikov	Mitsubishi Lancer Evo IX			GRE; 15	TUR; Ret	FIN	NZL; Ret	JPN; 2	GBR; Ret	13th	8
