= 2009 Rally Finland =

Motor rally competition

2009 Rally Finland 59th Neste Oil Rally Finland
Round 9 of the 2009 World Rally Championship
← Previous event	Next event →
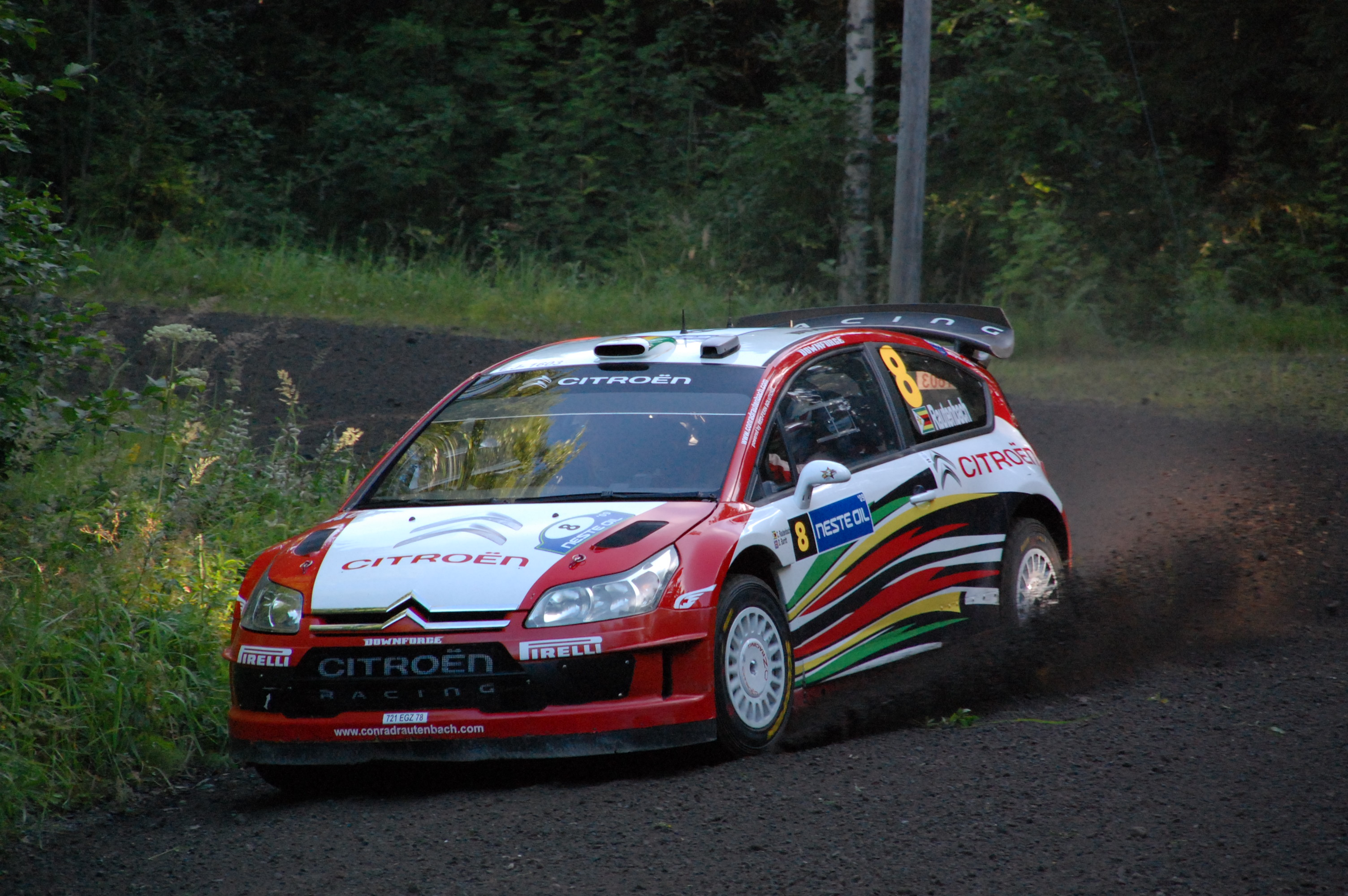
- Conrad Rautenbach driving a Citroën C4 WRC
- Host country: Finland
- Rally base: Jyväskylä
- Dates run: 30 July – 2 August 2009
- Stages: 23 (345.15 km; 214.47 miles)
- Stage surface: Gravel

Statistics
- Crews: 90 at start, 61 at finish

Overall results
- Overall winner: (Finland) Mikko Hirvonen (United Kingdom) BP Ford Abu Dhabi WRT

The 2009 Neste Oil Rally Finland was the 59th running of the Rally Finland and the ninth round of the 2009 World Rally Championship season. The rally consisted of 23 special stages and was won by Ford's Mikko Hirvonen. This marked his third victory in a row and his first in his home event. Last year's winner Sébastien Loeb of Citroën finished second and took his first podium since the Rally Argentina back in April. Jari-Matti Latvala beat Dani Sordo to the final podium spot.

== Entries ==
The final entry list included 90 crews – the highest number in any event this season. 18 drivers contested the event in the top category World Rally Car and ten were registered for the Junior World Rally Championship. In addition to usual names, Matti Rantanen, who finished seventh in last year's event in a private Ford Focus RS WRC 06, partnered Federico Villagra in the Munchi's Ford World Rally Team and drove the 2008-spec Focus WRC.

Ferrari's 2007 Formula One world champion Kimi Räikkönen made his WRC debut at the event. This was also his first rally on gravel, after competing in two snow rallies in Finland and in a tarmac rally in Italy. As previously, he drove the Super 2000 class Fiat Grande Punto Abarth prepared by Tommi Mäkinen Racing. Räikkönen faced competition from other S2000 entrants such as Juho Hänninen, Anton Alén and Janne Tuohino and from Group N drivers such as Patrik Flodin. Former Stobart M-Sport Ford driver Urmo Aava entered the event in a Honda Civic Type-R R3.

=== Entry list ===
No.	Driver	Co-driver	Entrant	Car	Gr.	Cl.
1	(France) Sébastien Loeb	(Monaco) Daniel Elena	(France) Citroën Total World Rally Team	Citroën C4 WRC	A	8
2	(Spain) Daniel Sordo	(Spain) Marc Martí	(France) Citroën Total World Rally Team	Citroën C4 WRC	A	8
3	(Finland) Mikko Hirvonen	(Finland) Jarmo Lehtinen	(United Kingdom) BP Ford Abu Dhabi World Rally Team	Ford Focus RS WRC 09	A	8
4	(Finland) Jari-Matti Latvala	(Finland) Miikka Anttila	(United Kingdom) BP Ford Abu Dhabi World Rally Team	Ford Focus RS WRC 09	A	8
5	(United Kingdom) Matthew Wilson	(United Kingdom) Scott Martin	(United Kingdom) Stobart VK M-Sport Ford Rally Team	Ford Focus RS WRC 08	A	8
6	(Norway) Henning Solberg	(Norway) Cato Menkerud	(United Kingdom) Stobart VK M-Sport Ford Rally Team	Ford Focus RS WRC 08	A	8
7	(Russia) Evgeny Novikov	(Australia) Dale Moscatt	(France) Citroën Junior Team	Citroën C4 WRC	A	8
8	(Zimbabwe) Conrad Rautenbach	(United Kingdom) Daniel Barritt	(France) Citroën Junior Team	Citroën C4 WRC	A	8
9	(Argentina) Federico Villagra	(Argentina) Jorge Perez Companc	(Argentina) Munchi's Ford World Rally Team	Ford Focus RS WRC 08	A	8
10	(Finland) Matti Rantanen	(Finland) Mikko Lukka	(Argentina) Munchi's Ford World Rally Team	Ford Focus RS WRC 08	A	8
11	(Norway) Petter Solberg	(United Kingdom) Phil Mills	(Norway) Petter Solberg MSN	Citroën Xsara WRC	A	8
12	(France) Sébastien Ogier	(France) Julien Ingrassia	(France) Citroën Junior Team	Citroën C4 WRC	A	8
14	(Norway) Mads Østberg	(Sweden) Jonas Andersson	(Norway) Adapta AS	Subaru Impreza WRC 2008	A	8
15	(United Arab Emirates) Khalid Al-Qassimi	(United Kingdom) Michael Orr	(United Kingdom) BP Ford Abu Dhabi World Rally Team	Ford Focus RS WRC 08	A	8
16	(Finland) Jari Ketomaa	(Finland) Mika Stenberg	(Finland) Ketomaa WRT	Subaru Impreza WRC 2007	A	8
17	(Finland) Jukka Ketomäki	(Finland) Kai Risberg	(Finland) Kai Risberg	Škoda Octavia WRC Evo3	A	8
31	(Germany) Aaron Burkart	(Germany) Michael Kölbach	(Germany) Aaron Burkart	Suzuki Swift S1600	A	6
32	(Poland) Michał Kościuszko	(Poland) Maciej Szczepaniak	(Poland) Michał Kościuszko	Suzuki Swift S1600	A	6
33	(Italy) Simone Bertolotti	(Italy) Luca Celestini	(Italy) Simone Bertolotti	Suzuki Swift S1600	A	6
34	(Italy) Luca Griotti	(Italy) Corrado Bonato	(Italy) Luca Griotti	Renault Clio R3	A	7
35	(France) Yoann Bonato	(France) Benjamin Boulloud	(France) Yoann Bonato	Suzuki Swift S1600	A	6
36	(Netherlands) Hans Weijs	(Belgium) Björn Degandt	(Netherlands) KNAF Talent First Team Holland	Citroën C2 S1600	A	6
37	(Netherlands) Kevin Abbring	(Netherlands) Erwin Mombaerts	(Netherlands) KNAF Talent First Team Holland	Renault Clio R3	A	7
38	(Czech Republic) Martin Prokop	(Czech Republic) Jan Tománek	(Czech Republic) Czech National Team	Citroën C2 S1600	A	6
39	(Germany) Mark Wallenwein	(Germany) Stefan Kopczyk	(Italy) TRT Srl.	Renault Clio R3	A	7
59	(Finland) Kalle Pinomäki	(Finland) Matti Kaskinen	(Finland) Kalle Pinomäki	Renault Clio R3	A	7
61	(Cyprus) Nicos Thomas	(Cyprus) Angelos Loizides	(Italy) Pirelli Star Driver	Mitsubishi Lancer Evolution X	N	4
62	(South Africa) Jon Williams	(United Kingdom) George Gwynn	(Italy) Pirelli Star Driver	Mitsubishi Lancer Evolution X	N	4
63	(Finland) Jarkko Nikara	(Finland) Jarkko Kalliolepo	(Italy) Pirelli Star Driver	Mitsubishi Lancer Evolution X	N	4
64	(Czech Republic) Martin Semerád	(Czech Republic) Bohuslav Ceplecha	(Italy) Pirelli Star Driver	Mitsubishi Lancer Evolution X	N	4
65	(New Zealand) Mark Tapper	(New Zealand) Jeff Judd	(Italy) Pirelli Star Driver	Mitsubishi Lancer Evolution X	N	4
66	(Finland) Juho Hänninen	(Finland) Mikko Markkula	(Finland) Juho Hänninen	Škoda Fabia S2000	N	4
67	(Finland) Anton Alén	(Finland) Timo Alanne	(Finland) Anton Alén	Fiat Abarth Grande Punto S2000	N	4
68	(Sweden) Patrik Flodin	(Sweden) Göran Bergsten	(Russia) Uspenskiy Rally Tecnica	Subaru Impreza WRX STi	N	4
69	(Finland) Janne Tuohino	(Finland) Markku Tuohino	(Finland) Janne Tuohino	Peugeot 207 S2000	N	4
70	(Finland) Kimi Räikkönen	(Finland) Kaj Lindström	(Finland) Kimi Räikkönen	Fiat Abarth Grande Punto S2000	N	4
71	(Finland) Jouni Arolainen	(Finland) Risto Pietiläinen	(Finland) Jouni Arolainen	Ford Focus RS WRC 04	A	8
72	(Finland) Mattias Therman	(Finland) Janne Perälä	(Argentina) Munchi's Ford World Rally Team	Ford Focus RS WRC 08	A	8
73	(Norway) Sveinung Bieltvedt	(Norway) Roger Eilertsen	(Norway) Sveinung Bieltvedt	Subaru Impreza WRX STi	N	4
74	(Estonia) Ott Tänak	(Estonia) Kristo Kraag	(Estonia) Ott Tänak	Subaru Impreza WRX STi	N	4
75	(Estonia) Urmo Aava	(Estonia) Kuldar Sikk	(Estonia) Urmo Aava	Honda Civic Type-R R3	A	7
76	(Finland) Ari Laivola	(Finland) Kari Mustalahti	(Finland) Ari Laivola	Mitsubishi Lancer Evolution IX	N	4
77	(Finland) Jukka Metsälä	(Finland) Sari Ohra-aho	(Finland) Jukka Metsälä	Mitsubishi Lancer Evolution X	N	4
78	(Russia) Radik Shaymiev	(Russia) Timur Kafarov	(Russia) Radik Shaymiev	Peugeot 207 S2000	N	4
79	(Finland) Reijo Muhonen	(Finland) Timo Mäenpää	(Finland) Reijo Muhonen	Mitsubishi Lancer Evolution IX	N	4
80	(Finland) Petri Lehtovirta	(Finland) Juha Kanerva	(Finland) Petri Lehtovirta	Mitsubishi Lancer Evolution IX	N	4
81	(Finland) Pekka Savela	(Finland) Ville Mäkelä	(Finland) Pekka Savela	Mitsubishi Lancer Evolution IX	N	4
82	(Finland) Jukka Hara	(Finland) Petteri Luostarinen	(Finland) Jukka Hara	Subaru Impreza WRX STi	N	4
83	(Finland) Ville Silvasti	(Finland) Jani Rauhala	(Finland) Jani Rauhala	Subaru Impreza WRX STi	N	4
84	(Finland) Timo Pulkkinen	(Finland) Lasse Miettinen	(Finland) Timo Pulkkinen	Subaru Impreza WRX STi	A	8
85	(Finland) Pekka Vihma	(Finland) Kim Niemelä	(Finland) Pekka Vihma	Mitsubishi Lancer Evolution IX	N	4
86	(Finland) Jarmo Komsi	(Finland) Pasi Karppinen	(Finland) Jarmo Komsi	Mitsubishi Lancer Evolution IX	N	4
87	(Finland) Kai Ahola	(Finland) Peter Flythström	(Finland) Kai Ahola	Mitsubishi Lancer Evolution VIII	A	8
88	(Italy) Fabio Frisiero	(Spain) Jordi Barrabés Costa	(Italy) Fabio Frisiero	Mitsubishi Lancer Evolution IX	N	4
89	(Estonia) Georg Gross	(Estonia) Raigo Mõlder	(Estonia) Georg Gross	Subaru Impreza WRX STi	N	4
90	(Finland) Tomi Weurlander	(Finland) Veijo Vyörykkä	(Finland) Tomi Weurlander	Mitsubishi Lancer Evolution VIII	N	4
91	(Finland) Jukka Kihlman	(Finland) Harri Kihlman	(Finland) Jukka Kihlman	Subaru Impreza WRX STi	N	4
92	(Finland) Jouni Virtanen	(Finland) Jussi Martiskin	(Finland) Jouni Virtanen	Subaru Impreza WRX STi	N	4
93	(Finland) Tony Ahti	(Finland) Mika Joensuu	(Finland) Tony Ahti	Mitsubishi Lancer Evolution IX	N	4
94	(Finland) Asko Mäkinen	(Finland) Veli-Matti Haljala	(Finland) Asko Mäkinen	Subaru Impreza WRX STi	N	4
95	(Finland) Axel Lindholm	(Finland) Timo Hantunen	(Finland) Axel Lindholm	Honda Civic Type-R	N	3
96	(Italy) Silvano Pintarelli	(Italy) Mauro Marchioni	(Italy) Silvano Pintarelli	Renault Clio R3	A	7
97	(Republic of Ireland) Craig Breen	(United Kingdom) Gareth Roberts	(Republic of Ireland) Craig Breen	Ford Fiesta ST	N	3
98	(Germany) Patrick Anglade	(Germany) Björn Röhm	(Germany) Patrick Anglade	Ford Fiesta ST	N	3
99	(Finland) Jussi Kumpumäki	(Finland) Mikael Korhonen	(Finland) Jussi Kumpumäki	Ford Fiesta ST	N	3
100	(Turkey) Emre Yurdakul	(Turkey) Burak Erdener	(Turkey) Castrol Ford Team Turkiye	Ford Fiesta ST	N	3
101	(Turkey) Burcu Cetinkaya	(Turkey) Cicek Guney	(Turkey) Castrol Ford Team Turkiye	Ford Fiesta ST	N	3
102	(United Arab Emirates) Bader Al-Jabri	(United Kingdom) Stephen McAuley	(United Arab Emirates) Team Abu Dhabi	Ford Fiesta ST	N	3
103	(United Arab Emirates) Majed Al-Shamsi	(United Kingdom) Allan Harryman	(United Arab Emirates) Team Abu Dhabi	Ford Fiesta ST	N	3
104	(Russia) Denis Grodetskiy	(Russia) Safoniy Lotko	(Estonia) Cueks Racing	Ford Fiesta ST	N	3
105	(United Arab Emirates) Ahmed Al-Mansoori	(Republic of Ireland) Killian Duffy	(United Arab Emirates) Team Abu Dhabi	Ford Fiesta ST	N	3
106	(Finland) Timo Pitkäniemi	(Finland) Ossi Lehtonen	(Finland) Timo Pitkäniemi	Renault Clio RS	N	3
107	(Italy) Fabrizio de Sanctis	(Italy) Sergio Biancolli	(Italy) Fabrizio de Sanctis	Mitsubishi Lancer Evolution VI	A	8
108	(France) Daniel Cambon	(France) Valerie Antherieu	(France) Daniel Cambon	Renault Clio RS	N	3
109	(Finland) Jari Laakso	(Finland) Jari Tarvainen	(Finland) Jari Laakso	Volkswagen Polo 1.4 16V	A	5
110	(Finland) Ville Ruokanen	(Finland) Timo Pallari	(Finland) Ville Ruokanen	Volkswagen Polo 1.4 16V	A	5
111	(Finland) Kari Hytönen	(Finland) Ismo Pietiläinen	(Finland) Kari Hytönen	Suzuki Swift Sport	N	2
112	(Finland) Ilkka Kariste	(Finland) Toni Valovaara	(Finland) Ilkka Kariste	Volkswagen Polo 1.4 16V	A	5
113	(Finland) Mikael Wikstedt	(Finland) Hannu Rokkanen	(Finland) Mikael Wikstedt	Škoda Fabia 1.4 16V	A	5
114	(Finland) Jouko Pulkkinen	(Finland) Petri Hänninen	(Finland) Jouko Pulkkinen	Volkswagen Polo GTi	N	2
115	(Finland) Toni Harsia	(Finland) Timo Kekkonen	(Finland) Toni Harsia	Volkswagen Polo 1.4 16V	A	5
116	(Finland) Teemu Horkama	(Finland) Sami Sarjula	(Finland) Teemu Horkama	Škoda Felicia 1.3	A	5
117	(Sweden) Patrik Ottosson	(Sweden) Stefan Ottosson	(Sweden) Patrik Ottosson	Volkswagen Polo 1.4 16V	A	5
118	(Finland) Raimo Kaisanlahti	(Finland) Tapani Pulkkinen	(Finland) Raimo Kaisanlahti	Volkswagen Polo 1.4 16V	A	5
119	(Finland) Tomi Vilenius	(Finland) Sami Ryynänen	(Finland) Tomi Vilenius	Ford Puma Kit Car	A	5
120	(Finland) Matti Tuominen	(Finland) Pekka Leppälä	(Finland) Matti Tuominen	Volkswagen Polo 1.4 16V	A	5
121	(Finland) Pasi Laaksomaa	(Finland) Susanna Söyrilä	(Finland) Pasi Laaksomaa	Volkswagen Polo 1.4 16V	A	5
122	(United Kingdom) Nick West	(United Kingdom) Chris Melling	(United Kingdom) Nick West	Volkswagen Polo 1.4 16V	A	5
123	(Barbados) Adrian Linton	(Barbados) Jonathan Linton	(Barbados) Jonathan Linton	Opel Astra OPC	N	3
124	(Finland) Juhani Länsikorpi	(Finland) Pasi Haataja	(Finland) Juhani Länsikorpi	Toyota Yaris	A	5

== Summary ==
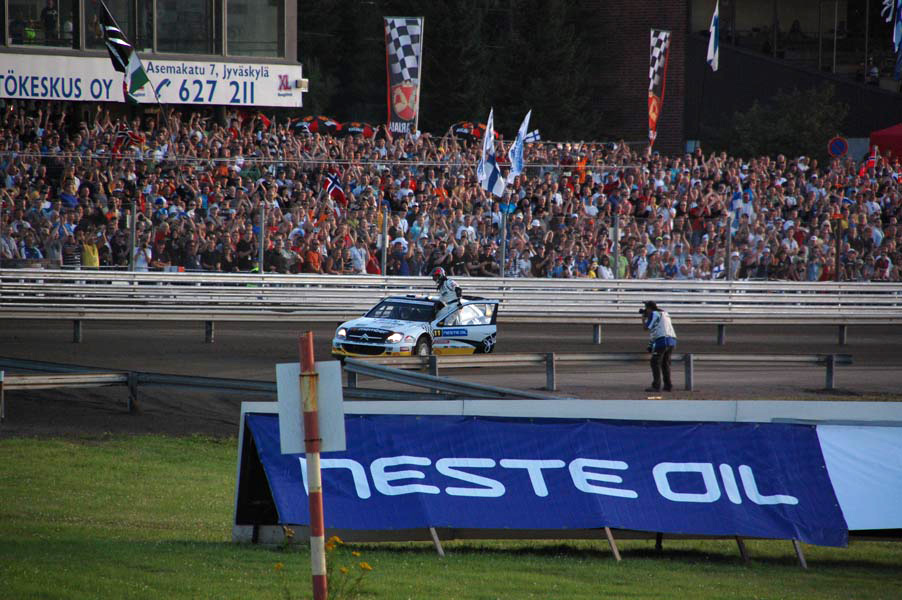
Petter Solberg on the Killeri super special stage

As in the previous year's event, the battle for the win was between the title contenders Mikko Hirvonen of Ford and Sébastien Loeb of Citroën. Although Loeb proved faster on the opening super special stage, Hirvonen took the lead when the rally really got underway on Friday, and began building up a lead by about a second per stage. Loeb backed off and settled for second after damaging a tyre and losing 13 seconds on SS15. Hirvonen's win was his first in his home event, after finishing runner-up to Marcus Grönholm in 2007 and to Loeb in 2008. Jari-Matti Latvala, who suffered from food poisoning on day two, passed Dani Sordo to take his first podium in his home event. Petter Solberg also looked set to challenge for a podium place, but suffered a puncture and then went wide and got stuck in a ditch right at the end of the fourth stage.

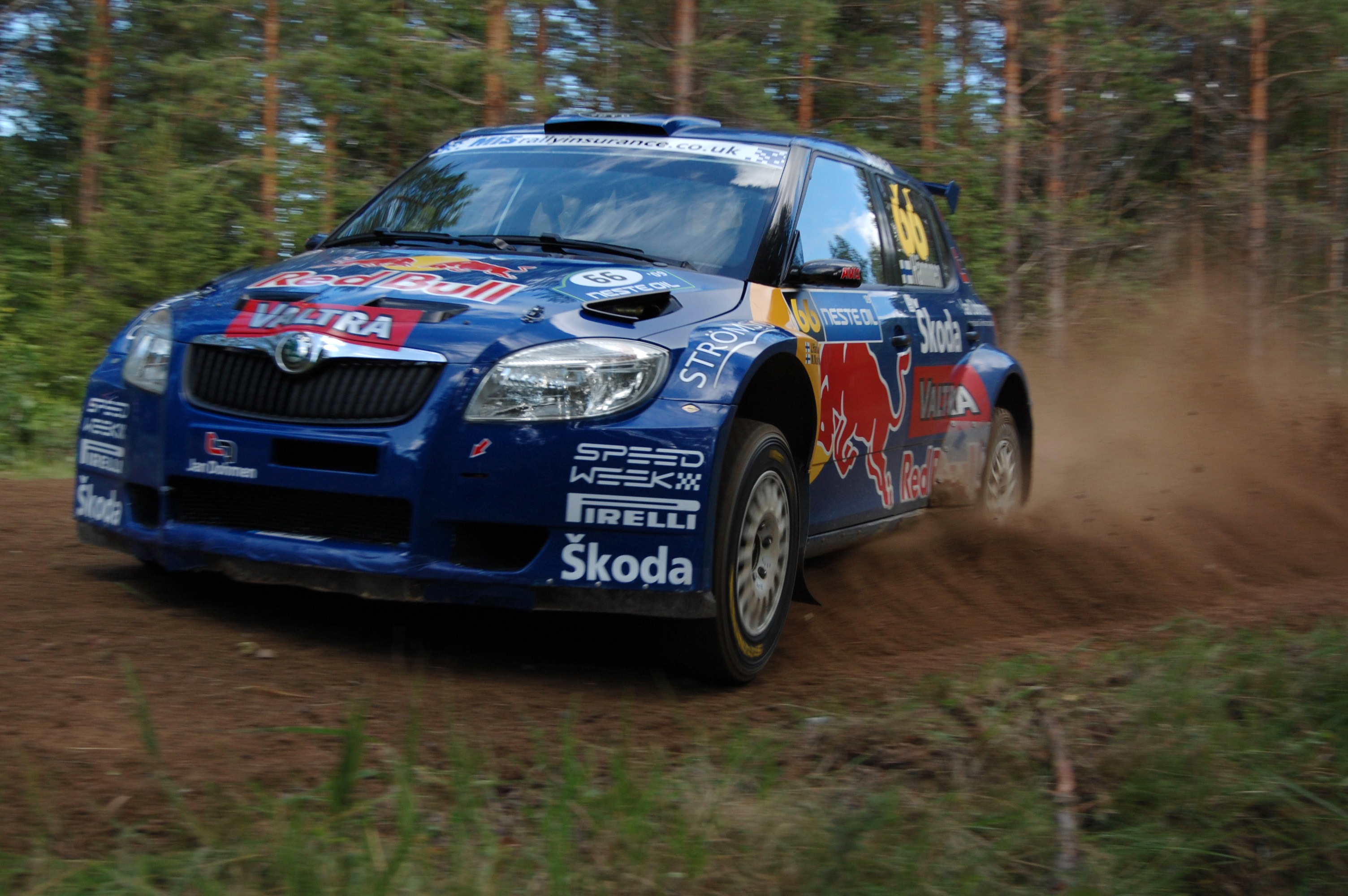
Red Bull Rally Team's Juho Hänninen won the Group N class in a Škoda Fabia S2000.

Munchi's Ford driver Matti Rantanen took a career-best fifth place in only his second rally in a World Rally Car. After Stobart's Henning Solberg, Rantanen's main challenger for the position, retired with a broken suspension, Rantanen was chased down by Citroën Junior Team's Sébastien Ogier. Ogier closed to within 0.6 seconds before the final stage but a time only 0.3 seconds faster than Rantanen's kept him in sixth place. Ogier's teammates Evgeny Novikov and Conrad Rautenbach both crashed out. Novikov crashed on both Friday and Saturday mornings while Rautenbach held ninth place until his accident on the penultimate stage.

Jari Ketomaa made his World Rally Car debut in a private Subaru Impreza WRC2007 and was another driver to challenge for fifth, the "best of the rest" position. He incurred a puncture and struggled with steering damage on Friday, losing over a minute, but recovered to overtake Stobart's Matthew Wilson for eighth and then began closing in on Mads Østberg in a year newer Impreza WRC. As the Norwegian crashed out on SS19, Ketomaa took the seventh place and his first-ever WRC points, and Wilson eighth and his first-ever point in the Rally Finland. Khalid al-Qassimi finished ninth and production class winner Juho Hänninen beat Munchi's Federico Villagra for tenth place. Martin Prokop won the Junior World Rally Championship category and secured the junior world title. Crowd favourite Kimi Räikkönen impressed in his WRC debut. Despite engine trouble, he held third place in the production class until rolling out at exactly the same place as Østberg. Räikkönen's performance drew praise from the top rally drivers.

== Results ==
Pos.	Driver	Co-driver	Car	Time	Difference	Points
WRC
1	(Finland) Mikko Hirvonen	(Finland) Jarmo Lehtinen	Ford Focus RS WRC 09	2:50:40.9	0.0	10
2	(France) Sébastien Loeb	(Monaco) Daniel Elena	Citroën C4 WRC	2:51:06.0	+25.1	8
3	(Finland) Jari-Matti Latvala	(Finland) Miikka Anttila	Ford Focus RS WRC 09	2:51:30.8	+49.9	6
4	(Spain) Dani Sordo	(Spain) Marc Martí	Citroën C4 WRC	2:51:47.0	+1:06.1	5
5	(Finland) Matti Rantanen	(Finland) Mikko Lukka	Ford Focus RS WRC 08	2:54:59.1	+4:18.2	4
6	(France) Sébastien Ogier	(France) Julien Ingrassia	Citroën C4 WRC	2:54:59.4	+4:18.5	3
7	(Finland) Jari Ketomaa	(Finland) Mika Stenberg	Subaru Impreza WRC 2007	2:55:48.4	+5:07.5	2
8	(United Kingdom) Matthew Wilson	(United Kingdom) Scott Martin	Ford Focus RS WRC 08	2:57:14.5	+6:33.6	1
JWRC
1	(Czech Republic) Martin Prokop	(Czech Republic) Jan Tománek	Citroën C2 S1600	3:17:03.1	0.0	10
2	(Finland) Kalle Pinomäki	(Finland) Matti Kaskinen	Renault Clio R3	3:17:58.6	+55.5	8
3	(Poland) Michał Kościuszko	(Poland) Maciek Szczepaniak	Suzuki Swift S1600	3:20:24.0	+3:20.9	6
4	(Germany) Aaron Nikolai Burkart	(Germany) Michael Kölbach	Suzuki Swift S1600	3:20:53.5	+3:50.4	5
5	(Germany) Mark Wallenwein	(Germany) Stefan Kopczyk	Renault Clio R3	3:30:28.6	+13:25.5	4
6	(Italy) Simone Bertolotti	(Italy) Luca Celestini	Suzuki Swift S1600	3:34:19.0	+17:15.9	3
7	(Netherlands) Hans Weijs, Jr.	(Belgium) Bjorn Degandt	Citroën C2 S1600	3:51:17.8	+34:14.7	2

== Special stages ==
Day	Stage	Time (EEST)	Name	Length	Winner	Time	Rally leader
1 (30-31 Jul)	SS1	19:00	Killeri 1	2.06 km	(France) Sébastien Loeb	1:20.3	(France) Sébastien Loeb
1 (30-31 Jul)	SS2	7:38	Jukojärvi 1	22.29 km	(Finland) Mikko Hirvonen	10:36.2	(Finland) Mikko Hirvonen
1 (30-31 Jul)	SS3	8:11	Kruununperä 1	13.51 km	(Finland) Mikko Hirvonen	6:29.9	(Finland) Mikko Hirvonen
1 (30-31 Jul)	SS4	8:59	Mökkiperä 1	13.64 km	(France) Sébastien Loeb	6:42.2	(Finland) Mikko Hirvonen
1 (30-31 Jul)	SS5	9:46	Palsankylä 1	13.92 km	(France) Sébastien Loeb	7:06.7	(Finland) Mikko Hirvonen
1 (30-31 Jul)	SS6	13:02	Jukojärvi 2	22.29 km	(Finland) Mikko Hirvonen	10:25.2	(Finland) Mikko Hirvonen
1 (30-31 Jul)	SS7	13:35	Kruununperä 2	13.51 km	(Finland) Mikko Hirvonen	6:22.3	(Finland) Mikko Hirvonen
1 (30-31 Jul)	SS8	14:23	Mökkiperä 2	13.64 km	(France) Sébastien Loeb	6:37.0	(Finland) Mikko Hirvonen
1 (30-31 Jul)	SS9	15:10	Palsankylä 2	13.92 km	(France) Sébastien Loeb	7:01.6	(Finland) Mikko Hirvonen
1 (30-31 Jul)	SS10	20:00	Killeri 2	2.06 km	(France) Sébastien Loeb	1:20.2	(Finland) Mikko Hirvonen
2 (1 Aug)	SS11	7:13	Leustu 1	21.35 km	(Finland) Mikko Hirvonen	10:04.8	(Finland) Mikko Hirvonen
2 (1 Aug)	SS12	8:02	Himos 1	20.94 km	(Finland) Mikko Hirvonen	10:31.7	(Finland) Mikko Hirvonen
2 (1 Aug)	SS13	9:25	Surkee 1	14.95 km	(Finland) Mikko Hirvonen	8:01.2	(Finland) Mikko Hirvonen
2 (1 Aug)	SS14	11:37	Leustu 2	21.35 km	(Finland) Mikko Hirvonen	10:03.4	(Finland) Mikko Hirvonen
2 (1 Aug)	SS15	12:26	Himos 2	20.94 km	(Finland) Mikko Hirvonen	10:35.4	(Finland) Mikko Hirvonen
2 (1 Aug)	SS16	13:49	Surkee 2	14.95 km	(Finland) Jari-Matti Latvala	7:59.7	(Finland) Mikko Hirvonen
2 (1 Aug)	SS17	16:11	Urria	12.75 km	(Finland) Mikko Hirvonen	5:55.5	(Finland) Mikko Hirvonen
2 (1 Aug)	SS18	17:19	Kavala	10.35 km	(Finland) Jari-Matti Latvala (France) Sébastien Ogier	5:10.1	(Finland) Mikko Hirvonen
2 (1 Aug)	SS19	17:52	Väärinmaja	29.29 km	(Finland) Jari-Matti Latvala	14:56.3	(Finland) Mikko Hirvonen
3 (2 Aug)	SS20	8:17	Hannula	10.82 km	(Finland) Jari-Matti Latvala	5:41.1	(Finland) Mikko Hirvonen
3 (2 Aug)	SS21	8:58	Myhinpää 1	15.06 km	(France) Sébastien Loeb	6:59.1	(Finland) Mikko Hirvonen
3 (2 Aug)	SS22	10:51	Myhinpää 2	15.06 km	(Finland) Jari-Matti Latvala	6:52.1	(Finland) Mikko Hirvonen
3 (2 Aug)	SS23	12:18	Ruuhimäki	6.5 km	(Finland) Jari-Matti Latvala	3:12.4	(Finland) Mikko Hirvonen

== Championship standings after the event ==
=== Drivers' championship ===
Pos	Driver	IRL (Republic of Ireland)	NOR (Norway)	CYP (Cyprus)	POR (Portugal)	ARG (Argentina)	ITA (Italy)	GRC (Greece)	POL (Poland)	FIN (Finland)	AUS (Australia)	ESP (Spain)	GBR (United Kingdom)	Pts
1	(Finland) Mikko Hirvonen	3	2	2	2	Ret	2	1	1	1				68
2	(France) Sébastien Loeb	1	1	1	1	1	4	Ret	7	2				65
3	(Spain) Dani Sordo	2	5	4	3	2	23	12	2	4				44
4	(Finland) Jari-Matti Latvala	14	3	12	Ret	6	1	3	Ret	3				31
5	(Norway) Henning Solberg	4	4	18	5	3	8	15	3	30				27
6	(Norway) Petter Solberg		6	3	4	Ret	3	Ret	4	Ret				25
7	(United Kingdom) Matthew Wilson	7	7	5	Ret	5	6	14	5	8				20
8	(France) Sébastien Ogier	6	10	Ret	17	7	Ret	2	Ret	6				16
9	(Argentina) Federico Villagra			7	7	4	Ret	4		11				14
10	(Zimbabwe) Conrad Rautenbach	18	Ret	6	Ret	Ret	9	5	8	Ret				8
11	(Norway) Mads Østberg		9		6		7	7	Ret	Ret				7
12	(United Arab Emirates) Khalid al-Qassimi	8		8	8		16	6		9				6
13	(Russia) Evgeny Novikov		12	Ret	Ret		5	16	9	Ret				4
13	(Australia) Chris Atkinson	5												4
13	(Finland) Matti Rantanen									5				4
16	(Poland) Krzysztof Hołowczyc								6					3
17	(Finland) Jari Ketomaa									7				2
18	(Qatar) Nasser Al-Attiyah			11	16	8	10	9						1
18	(Estonia) Urmo Aava	10	8							29				1
18	(Greece) Lambros Athanassoulas							8						1
Pos	Driver	IRL (Republic of Ireland)	NOR (Norway)	CYP (Cyprus)	POR (Portugal)	ARG (Argentina)	ITA (Italy)	GRC (Greece)	POL (Poland)	FIN (Finland)	AUS (Australia)	ESP (Spain)	GBR (United Kingdom)	Pts

Key
Colour	Result
Gold	Winner
Silver	2nd place
Bronze	3rd place
Green	Points finish
Blue	Non-points finish
Blue	Non-classified finish (NC)
Purple	Did not finish (Ret)
Black	Excluded (EX)
Black	Disqualified (DSQ)
White	Did not start (DNS)
White	Cancelled (C)
Blank	Withdrew entry from the event (WD)

=== Manufacturers' championship ===
Pos	Team	Event												Total points
Pos	Team	IRL (Republic of Ireland)	NOR (Norway)	CYP (Cyprus)	POR (Portugal)	ARG (Argentina)	ITA (Italy)	GRC (Greece)	POL (Poland)	FIN (Finland)	AUS (Australia)	ESP (Spain)	GBR (United Kingdom)	Total points
1	(France) Citroën Total World Rally Team	18	14	16	16	18	8	4	12	13				119
2	(United States) BP Ford World Rally Team	8	14	10	8	3	18	18	10	16				105
3	(United Kingdom) Stobart M-Sport Ford Rally Team	8	8	6	5	10	7	5	11	4				64
4	(France) Citroën Junior Team	5	2	4	0	2	5	6	5	4				33
5	(Argentina) Munchi's Ford World Rally Team	0	0	3	4	5	0	6	0	2				20
