= Team Abu Dhabi =

Team in the World Rally Championship

- Full name: Team Abu Dhabi
- Base: Cumbria, England
- Drivers: (United Arab Emirates) Khalid Al Qassimi
- Co-drivers: (United Kingdom) Michael Orr
- Chassis: Ford Fiesta RS WRC
- Tyres: Michelin

World Rally Championship history
- Debut: 2011 Rally Sweden
- Last event: 2011 Wales Rally GB
- Manufacturers' Championships: 0
- Drivers' Championships: 0
- Rally wins: 0

Team Abu Dhabi is a team competing in the World Rally Championship. Team Abu Dhabi was set up in 2007 with the support of the Abu Dhabi Tourism Authority (ADTA) with the purpose of giving drivers from Abu Dhabi the opportunity to compete internationally. During 2007 ADTA began sponsoring the Ford World Rally Team, in a deal that saw Emirati driver Khalid Al Qassimi competing for the team. In 2011 Team Abu Dhabi has entered as a separate 'WRC Team'.

== History ==
In late 2006 Ron Cremen, a former rally driver from Australia and team manager for Al Qassimi approached the Abu Dhabi Government with the concept of starting a junior rally team. Team Abu Dhabi was created under the guidance of Shaikh Sultan bin Tahnoon Al Nahyan, the Chairman of ADTA with the purpose of creating an opportunity for Abu Dhabi drivers to experience rallying at all levels. Al Qassimi contested the Middle East Rally Championship under the banner in 2007, while he joined the Ford World Rally Team from Rally Finland as a result of ADTA's sponsorship deal with the team.

In 2009 three drivers, Bader Al Jabri, Ahmed Al Mansoori and Majed Al Shamsi competed in the Fiesta Sporting Trophy International, run on WRC events. The trio finished third, fifth and sixth in the standings respectively. Al Jabri and Al Shamsi continued in the series in 2010, finishing second and fourth respectively. In 2011 they are competing in the Production World Rally Championship.

For 2011 Team Abu Dhabi has registered as a WRC Team, allowing Al Qassimi to score points for the manufacturers' championship.

== WRC Results ==
Year	Entrant	Car	Driver	1	2	3	4	5	6	7	8	9	10	11	12	13	WDC	Points	TC	Points
2011	Team Abu Dhabi	Ford Fiesta RS WRC	(United Arab Emirates) Khalid Al Qassimi	SWE; 10	MEX	POR; 14	JOR; 8	ITA; 13	ARG	GRE	FIN; 14	GER	AUS; 5	FRA; 12	ESP; 12	GBR	14th	15	6th	54
2011	Team Abu Dhabi	Ford Fiesta RS WRC	(Russia) Evgeny Novikov	SWE	MEX	POR	JOR	ITA	ARG	GRE	FIN	GER	AUS	FRA	ESP	GBR; 7	17th	12	6th	54
