= Maisa Torppa =

Finnish TV personality

Maisa Elina Torppa (née Heinola, born 17 April 1991) is a Finnish TV personality, practical nurse and flight attendant. She earned the title of Miss Bikini Finland in 2009.

A former TV chat host, Maisa Torppa has been at the center of media attention since her early adulthood. In 2012, she participated in Viidakon tähtöset, a celebrity version of Survivor. Since then, she has participated in at least six more reality shows, one of them starring her and fellow reality star Niko Saarinen (Maisan ja Nikon luksusmatkat).

Between 2016 and 2019, Torppa was in a relationship with rally driver Jari-Matti Latvala. The relationship was widely followed in the Finnish media.
