= Oleksandr Saliuk Jr. =

Ukrainian rally driver (born 1978)

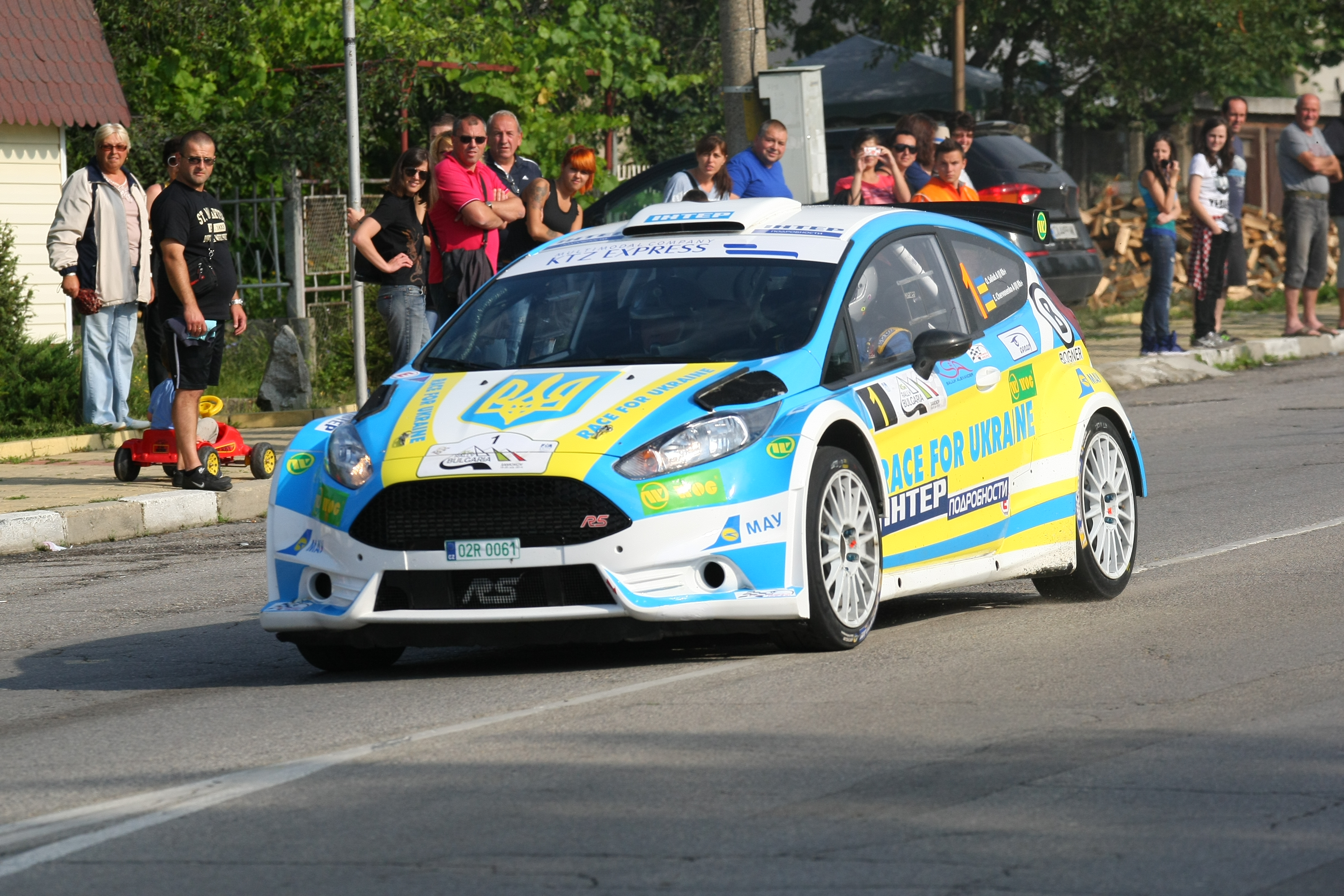

Personal information
- Nationality: (Ukraine) Ukrainian
- Born: July 16, 1978 (age 48); Kiev, Ukrainian SSR, Soviet Union (now Kyiv, Ukraine)

World Rally Championship record
- Years active: 2010 – present
- Teams: Mentos Ascania Racing
- Rallies: 6
- Championships: 0
- Rally wins: 0
- Podiums: 0
- Stage wins: 0
- Total points: 4
- First rally: 2010 Rally of Turkey
- Last rally: 2011 Rally Catalunya

Oleksandr Saliuk Jr. (Ukrainian: Олександр Салюк, молодший, born July 16, 1978) is a rally driver from Ukraine. Saliuk won the Ukrainian Rally Championship in 2006, 2007, 2009, 2010 and 2012. In 2011, Saliuk contested in the Production World Rally Championship (PWRC) with the Mentos Ascania Racing Team driving a Mitsubishi Lancer Evo IX. He scored four World Rally Championship points by finishing third on the 2011 Rally Australia.

== WRC results ==
Year	Entrant	Car	1	2	3	4	5	6	7	8	9	10	11	12	13	WDC	Points
2010	Mentos Ascania Racing	Mitsubishi Lancer Evo IX	SWE	MEX	JOR	TUR; Ret	NZL	POR	BUL	FIN	GER	JPN	FRA	ESP	GBR	NC	0
2011	Mentos Ascania Racing	Mitsubishi Lancer Evo IX	SWE; 32	MEX	POR; 20	JOR	ITA	ARG	GRE	FIN; Ret	GER	AUS; 8	FRA	ESP; 30	GBR; 25	24th	4

=== PWRC results ===
Year	Entrant	Car	1	2	3	4	5	6	7	PWRC	Points
2011	Mentos Ascania Racing	Mitsubishi Lancer Evo IX	SWE; 7	POR; 6	ARG	FIN; Ret	AUS; 3	ESP; 5	GBR; 8	8th	43
