= 2011 Wales Rally GB =

Rally car race

2011 Wales Rally GB 67th Wales Rally of Great Britain
Round 13 of the 2011 World Rally Championship season
← Previous event
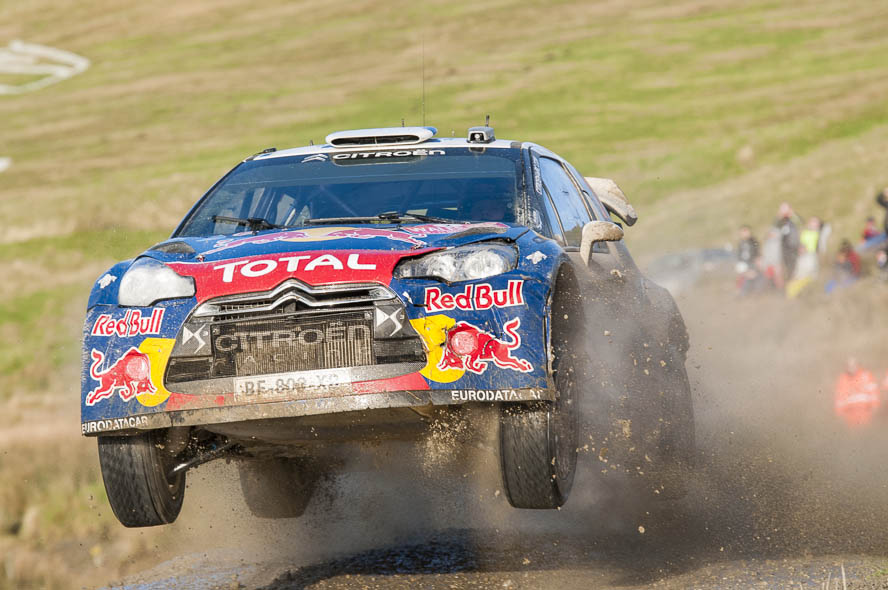
- Host country: Great Britain
- Rally base: Cardiff, Wales
- Dates run: 10 November – 13 November 2011
- Stages: 23 (358.59 km; 222.82 miles)
- Stage surface: Gravel with some tarmac
- Overall distance: 1,883.73 km (1,170.50 miles)

Statistics
- Crews: 78 at start, 39 at finish

Overall results
- Overall winner: (Finland) Jari-Matti Latvala (United Kingdom) Ford World Rally Team

The 2011 Wales Rally GB, formally the 67th Wales Rally of Great Britain, was the thirteenth and final round of the 2011 World Rally Championship season. The rally took place over 10–13 November, and was based in Cardiff, the capital city of Wales. The rally was also the seventh and final round of the Production World Rally Championship, and the sixth and final round of the WRC Academy. The route returned to the Great Orme stage for the first time in thirty years, as well as the Dyfnant and Dyfi East and West stages for the first time in fifteen years.

Jari-Matti Latvala took his first WRC victory since 2010 Rally Finland, and the fifth of his career, after taking the lead midway through the running on Saturday. With Sébastien Loeb's retirement on Sunday after a collision on a road section, Latvala's eventual winning margin was almost four minutes over Mads Østberg, who matched his best WRC result from Rally Sweden at the beginning of the season. Henning Solberg took his first podium since 2009 Rally Poland after Kris Meeke, who had been challenging Solberg for his first WRC podium, spun on the final stage of the event. Patrik Flodin took the PWRC victory to finish in second place in the class championship, while Craig Breen took the WRC Academy victory, and enough bonus points to win the championship.

== Report ==
=== WRC Championship ===
Sébastien Loeb and Mikko Hirvonen headed into the final round of the championship for the second time in three years as the only drivers that could claim the world title. Loeb held the lead of the championship with 222 points, having won Rally Catalunya, the event prior to Rally GB. Hirvonen was eight points in arrears, with a maximum of 28 points possible on the rally including Power Stage bonus points. Ultimately, the championship was decided during Friday's running when Hirvonen hit a tree stump during the first passing of the Dyfnant stage. He was forced to retire from the event after Ford deemed the damage to Hirvonen's Fiesta to be too extensive for him to rejoin. With Hirvonen unable to restart, Loeb claimed his eighth consecutive world title. While running second, 7.5 seconds behind Jari-Matti Latvala, Loeb retired from the event after a head-on collision with a spectator vehicle on the liaison route between the Halfway and Crychan stages on Sunday morning. There were no injuries in the accident.

=== Support categories ===
The PWRC title had already been decided prior to the rally, as Hayden Paddon had clinched the title in Australia after four wins from the first four rallies he contested. Paddon did not compete in the class in Great Britain, instead moving to an R4-specification Subaru Impreza. Seven drivers remained within mathematical contention for the runner-up placing, all of whom contested the event. The WRC Academy title was also yet to be decided prior to the rally, with Egon Kaur, Craig Breen and Yeray Lemes the only drivers in contention for the €500,000 scholarship given to the champion. Kaur held a 20-point lead over Breen and a 36-point advantage over Lemes with 42 points on offer. Breen won the event, and with numerous stage wins – including the final five stages – managed to beat Kaur for the championship title, winning it on countback of stage wins.

== Results ==
=== Event standings ===
Pos.	Driver	Co-driver	Car	Time	Difference	Points
Overall
1.	(Finland) Jari-Matti Latvala	(Finland) Miikka Anttila	Ford Fiesta RS WRC	3:27:03.5	0.0	26
2.	(Norway) Mads Østberg	(Sweden) Jonas Andersson	Ford Fiesta RS WRC	3:30:46.4	3:42.9	18
3.	(Norway) Henning Solberg	(Austria) Ilka Minor	Ford Fiesta RS WRC	3:34:08.6	7:05.1	15
4.	(United Kingdom) Kris Meeke	(Republic of Ireland) Paul Nagle	Mini John Cooper Works WRC	3:34:15.8	7:12.3	12
5.	(United Kingdom) Matthew Wilson	(United Kingdom) Scott Martin	Ford Fiesta RS WRC	3:36:00.8	8:57.3	10
6.	(Estonia) Ott Tänak	(Estonia) Kuldar Sikk	Ford Fiesta RS WRC	3:36:30.6	9:27.1	8
7.	(Russia) Evgeny Novikov	(France) Denis Giraudet	Ford Fiesta RS WRC	3:36:51.2	9:47.7	6
8.	(Netherlands) Dennis Kuipers	(Belgium) Frédéric Miclotte	Ford Fiesta RS WRC	3:37:16.2	10:12.7	4
9.	(United States) Ken Block	(United States) Alex Gelsomino	Ford Fiesta RS WRC	3:43:04.7	16:01.2	2
10.	(Portugal) Armindo Araújo	(Portugal) Miguel Ramalho	Mini John Cooper Works WRC	3:44:05.1	17:01.6	1
PWRC
1. (14.)	(Sweden) Patrik Flodin	(Finland) Timo Alanne	Subaru Impreza WRX STI	3:49:32.2	0.0	25
2. (15.)	(Poland) Michał Kościuszko	(Poland) Maciej Szczepaniak	Mitsubishi Lancer Evolution X	4:01:46.9	12:14.7	18
3. (16.)	(Peru) Nicolás Fuchs	(Argentina) Rubén García	Mitsubishi Lancer Evolution X	4:02:18.7	12:46.5	15
4. (17.)	(Russia) Dmitry Tagirov	(Russia) Anna Zavershinskaya	Subaru Impreza WRX STI	4:03:22.0	13:49.8	12
5. (18.)	(United Arab Emirates) Majed Al Shamsi	(Republic of Ireland) Killian Duffy	Subaru Impreza WRX STI	4:03:53.4	14:21.2	10
6. (23.)	(Ukraine) Oleksiy Kikireshko	(Estonia) Sergey Larens	Mitsubishi Lancer Evolution IX	4:11:33.8	22:01.6	8
7. (24.)	(United Kingdom) Harry Hunt	(United Kingdom) Robbie Durant	Citroën DS3 R3	4:13:58.8	24:26.6	6
8. (25.)	(Ukraine) Oleksandr Saliuk, Jr.	(Ukraine) Pavlo Cherepin	Mitsubishi Lancer Evolution IX	4:15:08.5	25:36.3	4
9. (34.)	(Ukraine) Valeriy Gorban	(Ukraine) Andrey Nikolayev	Mitsubishi Lancer Evolution IX	4:32:54.4	43:22.2	2
WRC Academy^{†}
1.	(Republic of Ireland) Craig Breen	(United Kingdom) Gareth Roberts	Ford Fiesta R2	3:06:10.7	0.0	39
2.	(Estonia) Egon Kaur	(Estonia) Erik Lepikson	Ford Fiesta R2	3:10:46.8	4:36.1	19
3.	(United Kingdom) Alastair Fisher	(United Kingdom) Daniel Barritt	Ford Fiesta R2	3:13:14.7	7:04.0	16
4.	(Germany) Christian Riedemann	(Germany) Michael Wenzel	Ford Fiesta R2	3:15:01.8	8:51.1	12
5.	(Australia) Molly Taylor	(United Kingdom) Sebastian Marshall	Ford Fiesta R2	3:17:05.0	10:54.3	11
6.	(Russia) Sergey Karyakin	(Russia) Anton Vlasyuk	Ford Fiesta R2	3:19:36.9	13:26.2	8
7.	(Germany) Valentin Hummel	(Germany) Katja Geyer	Ford Fiesta R2	3:23:04.2	16:53.5	0
8.	(Italy) Andrea Crugnola	(Italy) Michele Ferrara	Ford Fiesta R2	3:25:13.8	19:03.1	4
9.	(Spain) Yeray Lemes	(Spain) Rogelio Peñate	Ford Fiesta R2	3:25:19.5	19:08.8	2
10.	(Estonia) Miko-Ove Niinemäe	(Estonia) Toomas Valter	Ford Fiesta R2	3:30:15.9	24:05.2	1

† – The WRC Academy featured the first two days of the rally.

=== Special stages ===
Day	Stage	Time	Name	Length	Winner	Time	Avg. spd.	Rally leader
Leg 1 (10–11 November)	SS1	14:38	Great Orme 1	4.74 km	(Finland) Jari-Matti Latvala	2:39.3	107.12 km/h	(Finland) Jari-Matti Latvala
Leg 1 (10–11 November)	SS2	14:55	Great Orme 2	4.74 km	(France) Sébastien Loeb	2:40.4	106.38 km/h	(Finland) Jari-Matti Latvala
Leg 1 (10–11 November)	SS3	16:18	Clocaenog	15.77 km	(Finland) Mikko Hirvonen	9:14.1	102.46 km/h	(France) Sébastien Loeb
Leg 1 (10–11 November)	SS4	7:33	Gartheiniog 1	19.72 km	(France) Sébastien Loeb	11:18.9	104.57 km/h	(France) Sébastien Loeb
Leg 1 (10–11 November)	SS5	8:30	Dyfi West 1	10.31 km	(Finland) Mikko Hirvonen	6:14.1	99.21 km/h	(France) Sébastien Loeb
Leg 1 (10–11 November)	SS6	8:48	Dyfi East 1	6.72 km	(Finland) Mikko Hirvonen	3:41.5	109.22 km/h	(Finland) Mikko Hirvonen
Leg 1 (10–11 November)	SS7	9:43	Dyfnant 1	21.34 km	(France) Sébastien Loeb	12:41.0	100.95 km/h	(France) Sébastien Loeb
Leg 1 (10–11 November)	SS8	14:18	Dyfi West 2	10.31 km	(Finland) Jari-Matti Latvala	6:24.8	96.46 km/h	(France) Sébastien Loeb
Leg 1 (10–11 November)	SS9	14:36	Dyfi East 2	6.72 km	(United Kingdom) Kris Meeke	3:46.8	106.67 km/h	(France) Sébastien Loeb
Leg 1 (10–11 November)	SS10	14:51	Gartheiniog 2	19.72 km	(Finland) Jari-Matti Latvala	11:24.3	103.74 km/h	(France) Sébastien Loeb
Leg 1 (10–11 November)	SS11	16:01	Dyfnant 2	21.34 km	(Finland) Jari-Matti Latvala	12:47.1	100.15 km/h	(France) Sébastien Loeb
Leg 2 (12 November)	SS12	9:24	Hafren 1	32.14 km	(France) Sébastien Loeb	18:39.1	103.39 km/h	(France) Sébastien Loeb
Leg 2 (12 November)	SS13	10:05	Sweet Lamb 1	4.01 km	(Finland) Jari-Matti Latvala	2:48.5	85.67 km/h	(France) Sébastien Loeb
Leg 2 (12 November)	SS14	10:23	Myherin 1	27.88 km	(France) Sébastien Loeb	15:44.6	106.25 km/h	(France) Sébastien Loeb
Leg 2 (12 November)	SS15	13:51	Hafren 2	32.14 km	(Finland) Jari-Matti Latvala	19:11.6	100.47 km/h	(Finland) Jari-Matti Latvala
Leg 2 (12 November)	SS16	14:32	Sweet Lamb 2	4.01 km	(Finland) Jari-Matti Latvala	2:50.8	84.52 km/h	(Finland) Jari-Matti Latvala
Leg 2 (12 November)	SS17	14:50	Myherin 2	27.88 km	(Finland) Jari-Matti Latvala	15:57.4	104.83 km/h	(Finland) Jari-Matti Latvala
Leg 3 (13 November)	SS18	7:38	Halfway 1	14.93 km	(Finland) Jari-Matti Latvala	8:45.6	102.26 km/h	(Finland) Jari-Matti Latvala
Leg 3 (13 November)	SS19	8:06	Crychan 1	22.73 km	(Finland) Jari-Matti Latvala	12:29.6	109.16 km/h	(Finland) Jari-Matti Latvala
Leg 3 (13 November)	SS20	8:42	Monument 1	4.36 km	(France) Sébastien Ogier	2:41.9	96.95 km/h	(Finland) Jari-Matti Latvala
Leg 3 (13 November)	SS21	10:36	Halfway 2	14.93 km	(Finland) Jari-Matti Latvala	8:59.8	99.57 km/h	(Finland) Jari-Matti Latvala
Leg 3 (13 November)	SS22	11:04	Crychan 2	22.73 km	(France) Sébastien Ogier	12:39.8	107.70 km/h	(Finland) Jari-Matti Latvala
Leg 3 (13 November)	SS23	12:11	Monument 2 (Power stage)	4.36 km	(France) Sébastien Ogier	2:41.3	97.31 km/h	(Finland) Jari-Matti Latvala

=== Power Stage ===
The "Power stage" was a live, televised 4.36 km (2.71 mi) stage at the end of the rally, held near Builth Wells.

Pos	Driver	Time	Diff.	Avg. speed	Points
1	(France) Sébastien Ogier	2:41.3	0.0	97.31 km/h	3
2	(Spain) Dani Sordo	2:44.0	+2.7	95.71 km/h	2
3	(Finland) Jari-Matti Latvala	2:44.5	+3.2	95.42 km/h	1
