= Jari-Matti Latvala =

Finnish rally driver (born 1985)

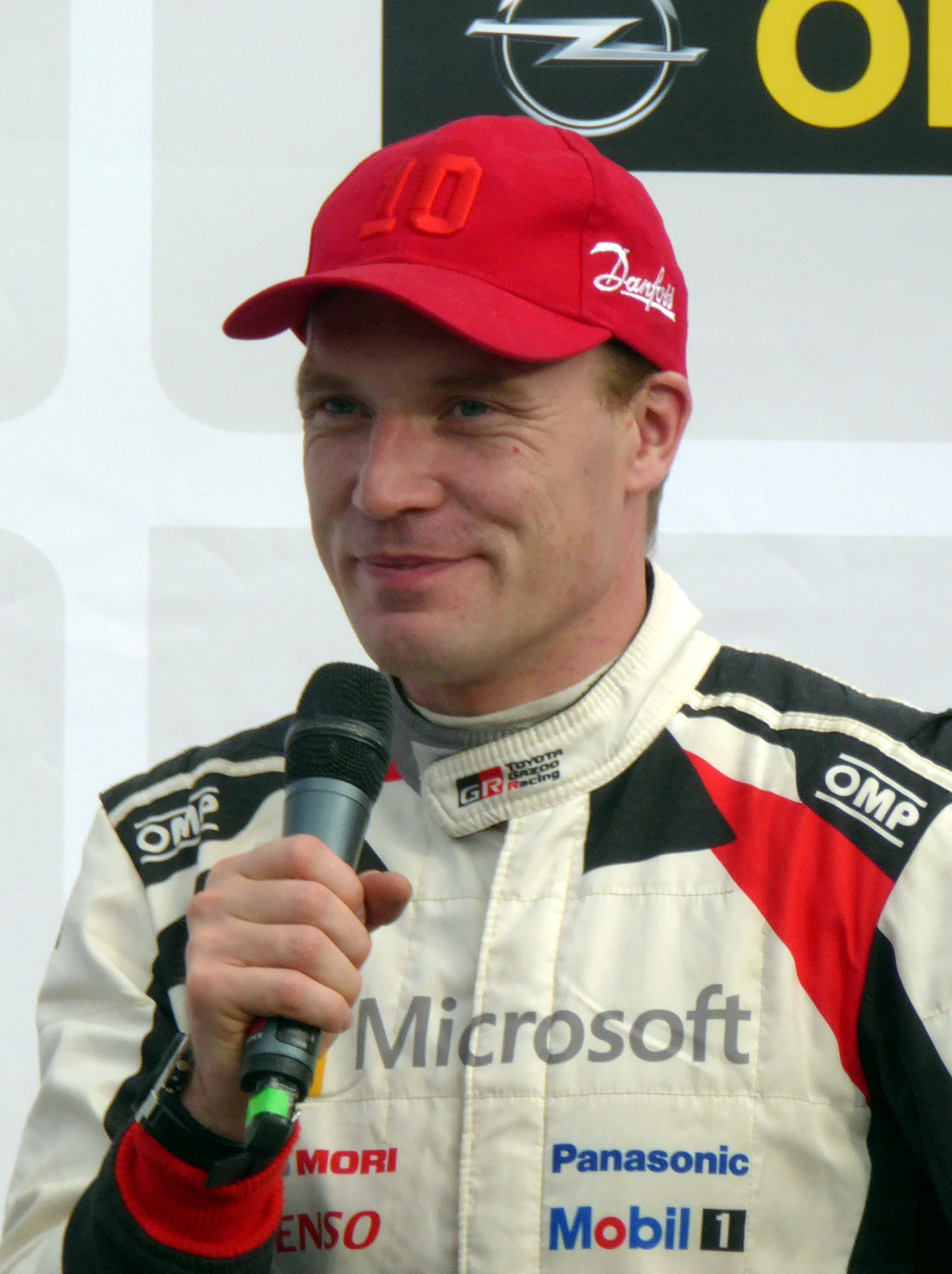
- Latvala at the Rally Deutschland 2017

Personal information
- Nationality: (Finland) Finnish
- Full name: Jari-Matti Johannes Latvala
- Born: 3 April 1985 (age 41); Töysä, Finland

World Rally Championship record
- Years active: 2002–2020, 2023–2026
- Co-driver: (United Kingdom) Carl Williamson (Finland) Miikka Anttila (Finland) Juho Hänninen (Finland) Janni Hussi
- Teams: Stobart Ford, Ford, Volkswagen, Toyota
- Rallies: 213
- Championships: 0
- Rally wins: 18
- Podiums: 67
- Stage wins: 539
- Total points: 1685
- First rally: 2002 Rally GB
- First win: 2008 Swedish Rally
- Last win: 2018 Rally Australia
- Last rally: 2026 Rally Finland

Jari-Matti Johannes Latvala (Finnish pronunciation: [ˈjɑriˌmɑtːi ˈlɑt.ʋɑ.lɑ]; born 3 April 1985) is a Finnish rally driver who has competed in the World Rally Championship (WRC). His co-driver for most of his career was Miikka Anttila, who co-drove for Latvala between the 2003 Rallye Deutschland and 2019 Rally Catalunya. He is well known for his aggressive driving style, which earns him many plaudits, and comparisons to the late Colin McRae. With 18 event victories in the WRC, he is one of the most successful drivers to not have won a championship. Latvala is also the driver with the most World Rally starts in the sport which he achieved in 2019, 17 years after his debut.

Starting in 2021, Latvala served as the team principal of Toyota Gazoo Racing WRT, replacing Tommi Mäkinen.

== Career ==
Latvala began driving when he was eight years old, after receiving a Ford Escort from his father Jari Latvala, also a rally driver and 1994 national champion in the Group N class. At the age of ten, Latvala started practicing with an Opel Ascona on a frozen lake.

=== 2000s ===
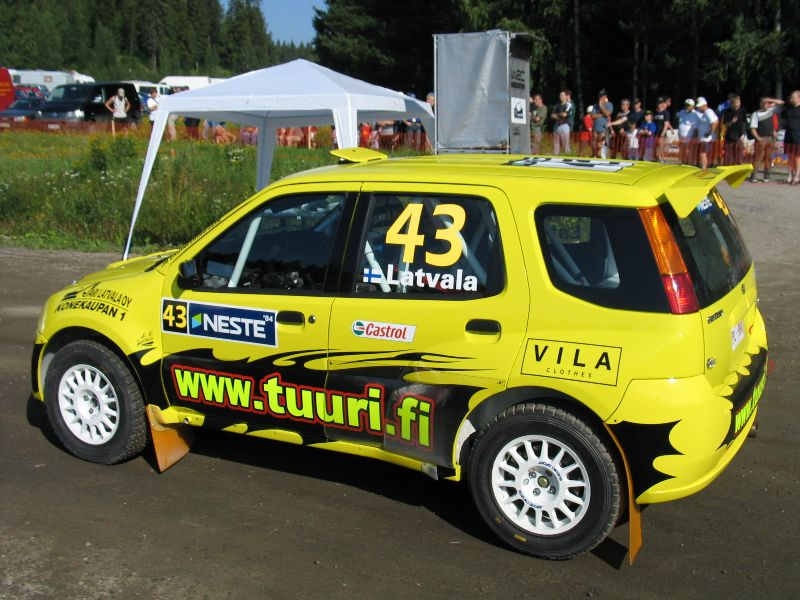
Latvala driving his Suzuki Ignis S1600 at the 2004 Rally Finland

Latvala's first world rally was the 2002 Rally Great Britain at the age of 17. He finished in 17th position with a Mitsubishi Lancer Evolution VI. In 2003, Latvala competed in four WRC events with a Ford Focus WRC, finishing tenth at the Acropolis Rally, 17th at the Rallye Deutschland, 14th at the Neste Oil Rally Finland and tenth at the Rally Great Britain.

In 2004, Latvala mostly competed with an S1600 class Junior World Rally Championship car. His best overall result in the World Rally Championship was 21st with a Group N Subaru Impreza WRX STI at the Tour de Corse. In the 2005 season, Latvala competed in nine world rallies; six with the Group N Impreza and three with a World Rally Car. His best overall result was 16th, which he managed three times; at the Swedish Rally with a Toyota Corolla WRC and at the Tour de Corse and the Rally d'Italia Sardegna with the Impreza.

=== 2006–2007: Stobart Ford ===
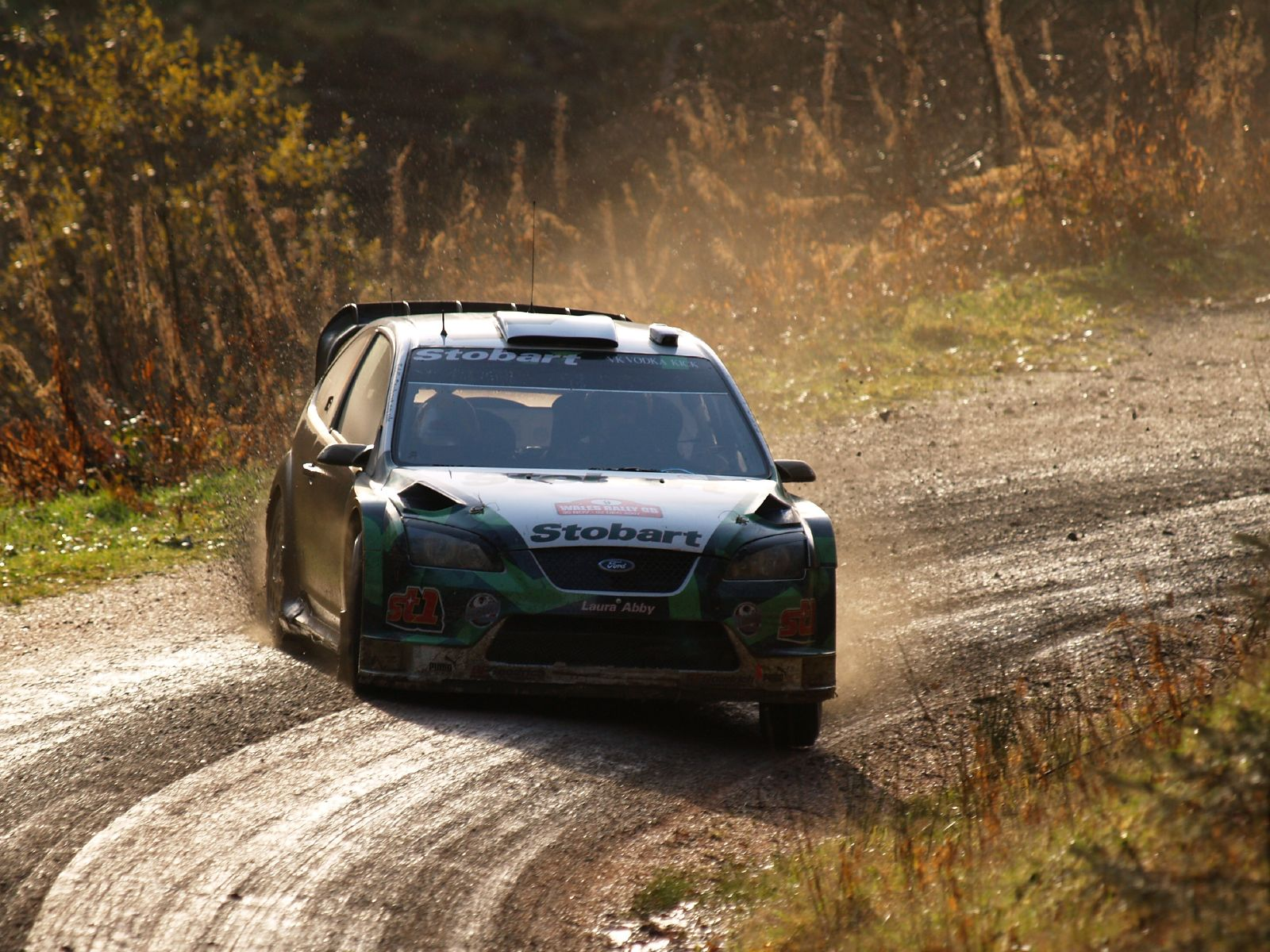
Latvala driving his Ford Focus RS WRC 06 at the 2007 Rally GB.

In 2006, Latvala competed in 11 world rallies. He drove the Subaru Impreza WRX STI in six, a Ford Focus WRC in four and a Toyota Corolla WRC at his home event, the Neste Oil Rally Finland. His best results came in the last three rallies. At the Telstra Rally Australia, he won the Production Car World Rally Championship (PCWRC) class, and finished sixth overall. At the Propecia Rally New Zealand, he finished eighth overall and also won the PCWRC. With the Focus WRC, he recorded his career-best result by finishing fourth at the last event of the season, the Rally Great Britain. Points from these rallies then placed Latvala 13th overall in the drivers' championship.

In 2007, Latvala competed a full 16-event programme for Stobart M-Sport Ford with Matthew Wilson and Henning Solberg as teammates. He started the season with retirements in Monte Carlo and Sweden. At the Rally Norway, Latvala was in contention for his first podium place, but had to settle for fifth after a 90 seconds time penalty. He did, however, take his first stage win on SS5. Latvala later took his first podium at the 2007 Rally Ireland. At the last rally of the season, Rally GB, he lost ten minutes on the last stage of day one due to windscreen wiper failure, but went on to win ten of the remaining 11 stages under the SupeRally rules, finishing tenth overall.

=== 2008: Ford's factory team ===
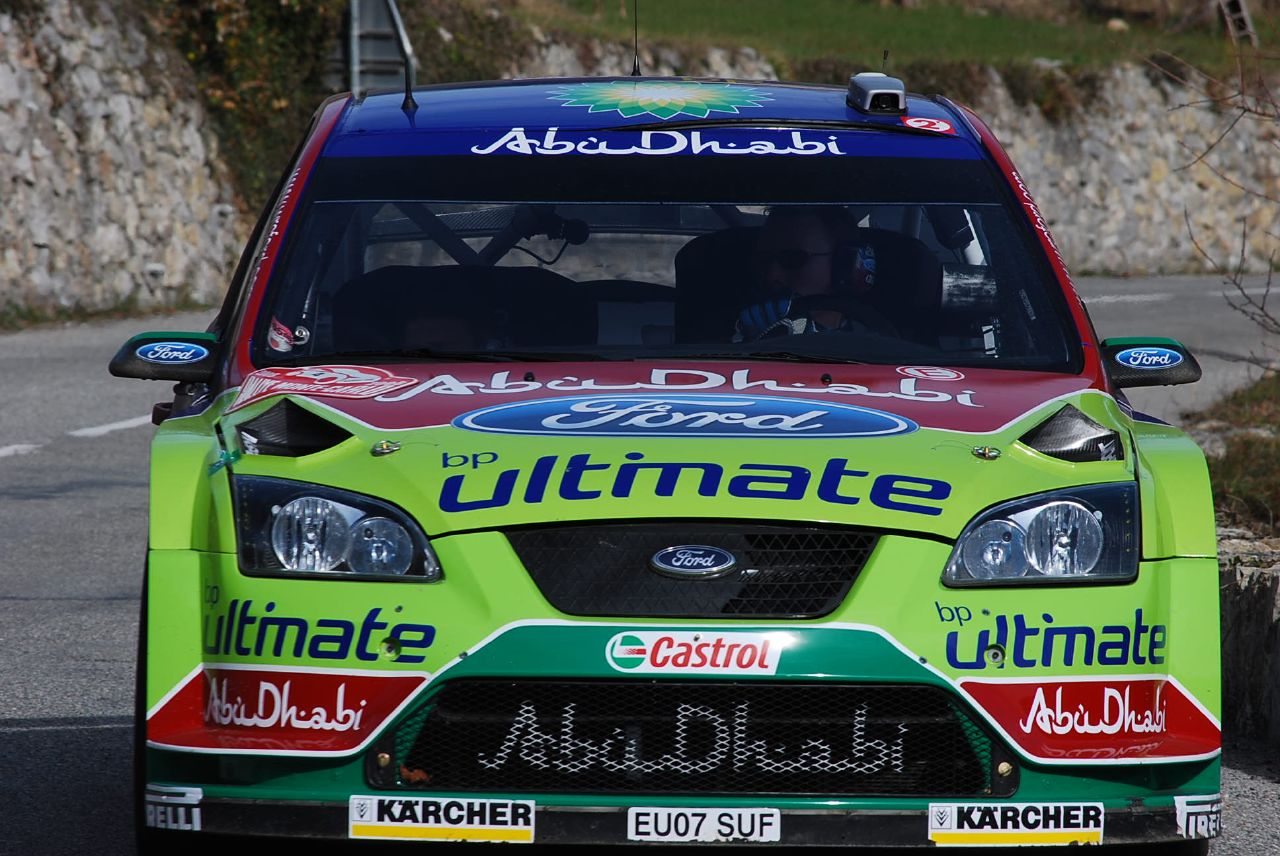
Latvala at the 2008 Monte Carlo Rally.

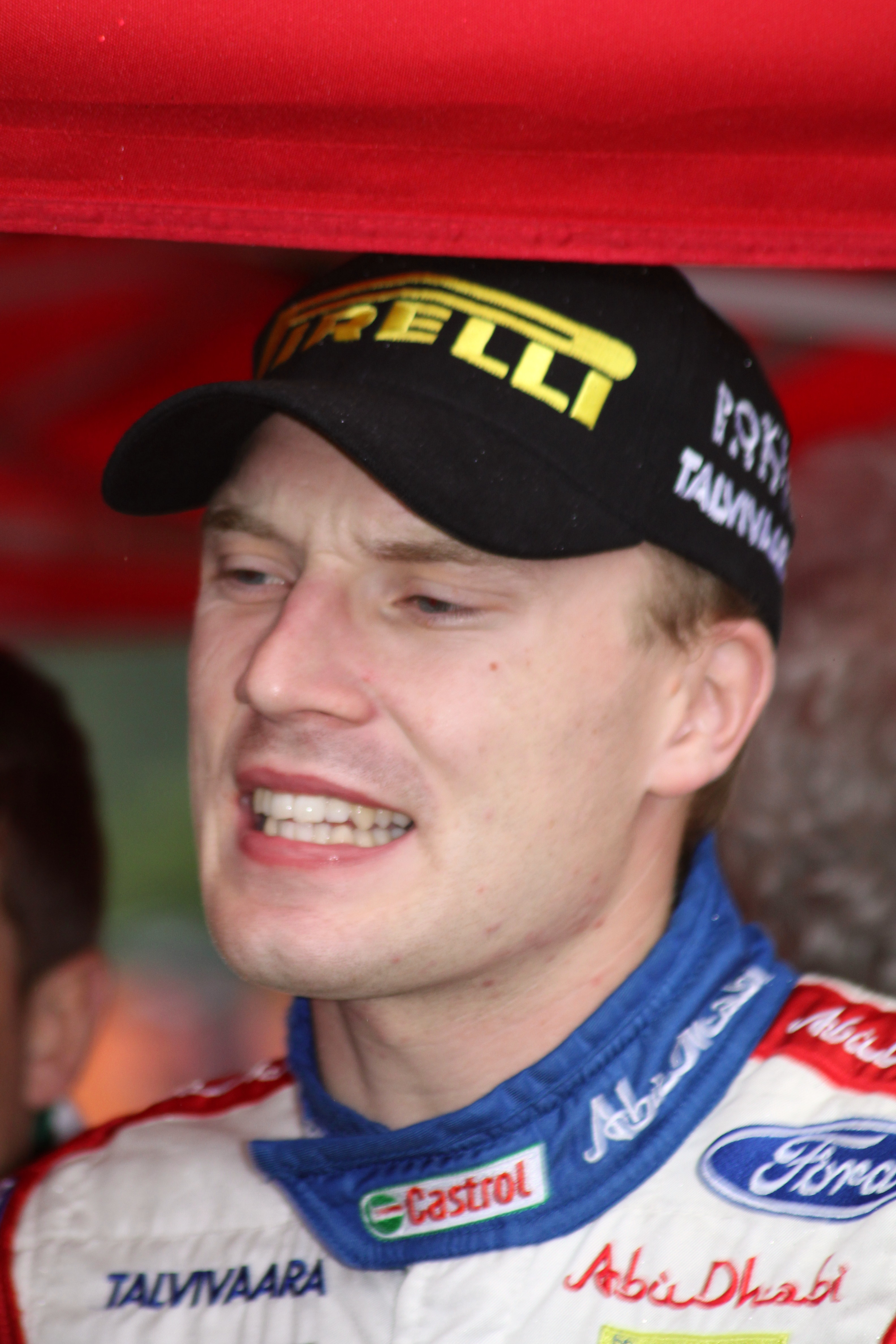
Jari-Matti Latvala in official opening – Bulgaria 2010

In 2008, Latvala joined Ford's factory team as a number two driver, partnering Mikko Hirvonen and replacing Marcus Grönholm who had announced his retirement from the WRC at the end of 2007. The opening round of the season wasn't lucky for the young Finn – he suffered a puncture after cutting a corner too deep on the very first stage and lost even more time because of a non-fully operative pneumatic wrench. Latvala continued to fight and was ninth overall before SS12, but he made another mistake there and heavily damaged the front left suspension in his Focus, forcing himself to retire for good. At the second rally of the season, 2008 Swedish Rally, he had good pace from the beginning – he won all regular special stages on day one, pulling away from the runner-up spot slowly, but consistently. He later had some problems and wasn't the fastest on any of the remaining stages, but managed to keep his position throughout the rally. The 22-year-old therefore took his first WRC win to become the youngest winner in the history of the World Rally Championship. The previous record was held by Henri Toivonen who was 24 years and 86 days old when he won the 1980 RAC Rally. For his performance during the Swedish rally, Latvala was given the Abu Dhabi Spirit Of The Rally award. At the first gravel event of the season, the 2008 Rally México, despite officially claiming no intentions to win the event, he was the fastest driver on the first two stages and was leading the rally throughout the first day, pulling out from the current World Rally Champion, Sébastien Loeb. Unfortunately for the young Finn, the turbo in his Ford Focus was malfunctioning during the second day, making his car uncompetitive. This, along with having to be the opening driver on the stages 9–16, having to sweep the track of the loose gravel, cost him a substantial amount of time and Latvala finished the rally third.

=== 2009 season ===
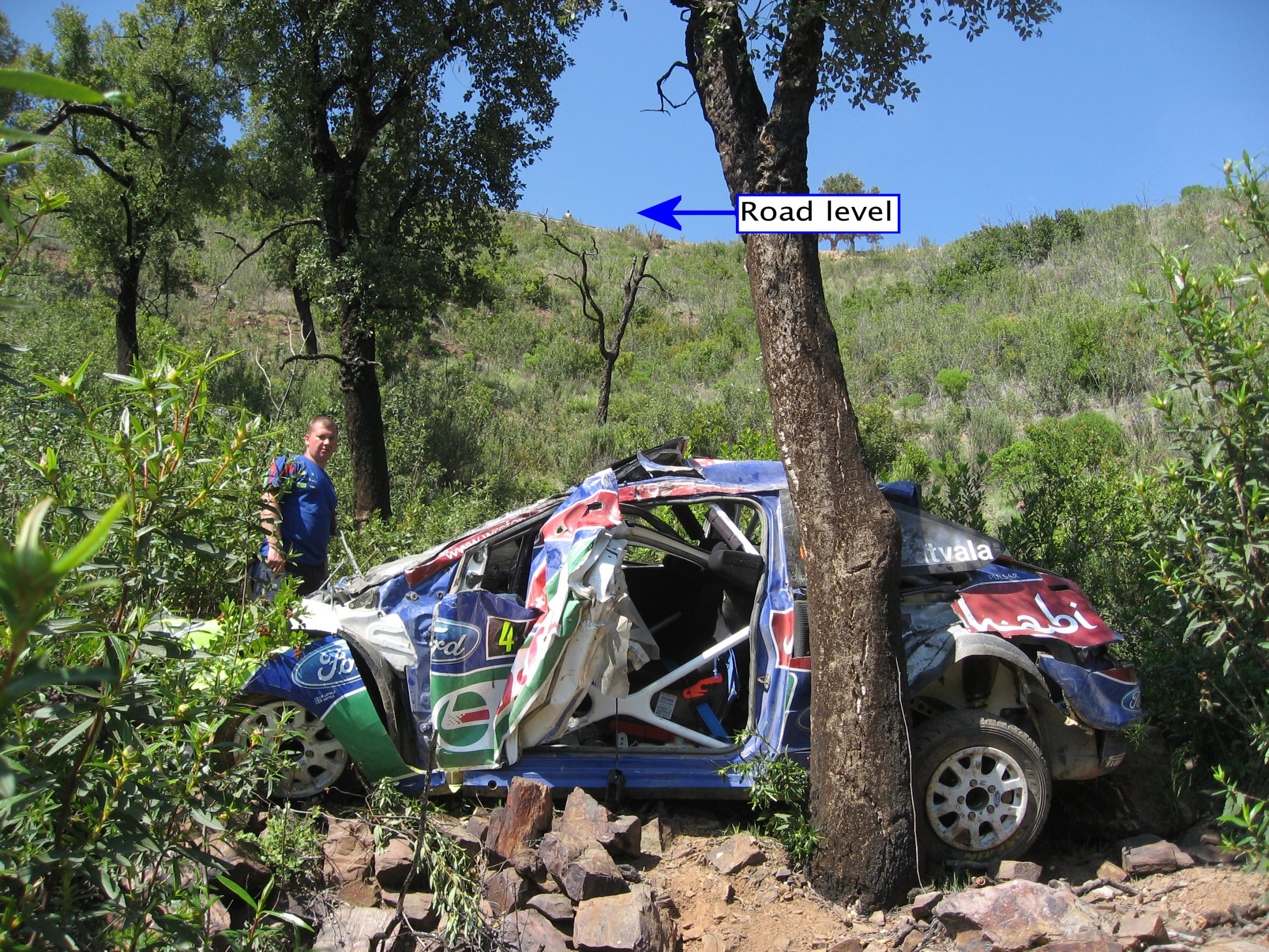
Latvala's Ford Focus after crashing out of the 2009 Rally de Portugal on SS4.

For 2009, the expectation was for Latvala to progress in his performance as number two driver for Ford's factory team. However the start of the season became a big disappointment for the team, as Latvala went off the road in three of the first four rallies of the year. In Portugal, he and his co-driver Miikka Anttila were lucky to escape injury in the most serious crash in Latvala's career. They went off the road on a left-hand bend and rolled 17 times, 150m down a steep hill, and finally came to rest against a tree. Latvala had specifically been focusing to combat his driver weaknesses going into this rally, so the accident put some extra pressure on him for the future, although he also admitted that he would fully understand if the team did not require his services because of his erratic reputation. However, after a consistent, steady drive in Argentina, Latvala went on to take his second WRC win of his career on Rally Sardinia ahead of teammate Mikko Hirvonen. He led from beginning to end, hence driving as first car on the road on both day two and three.

=== 2010 season ===
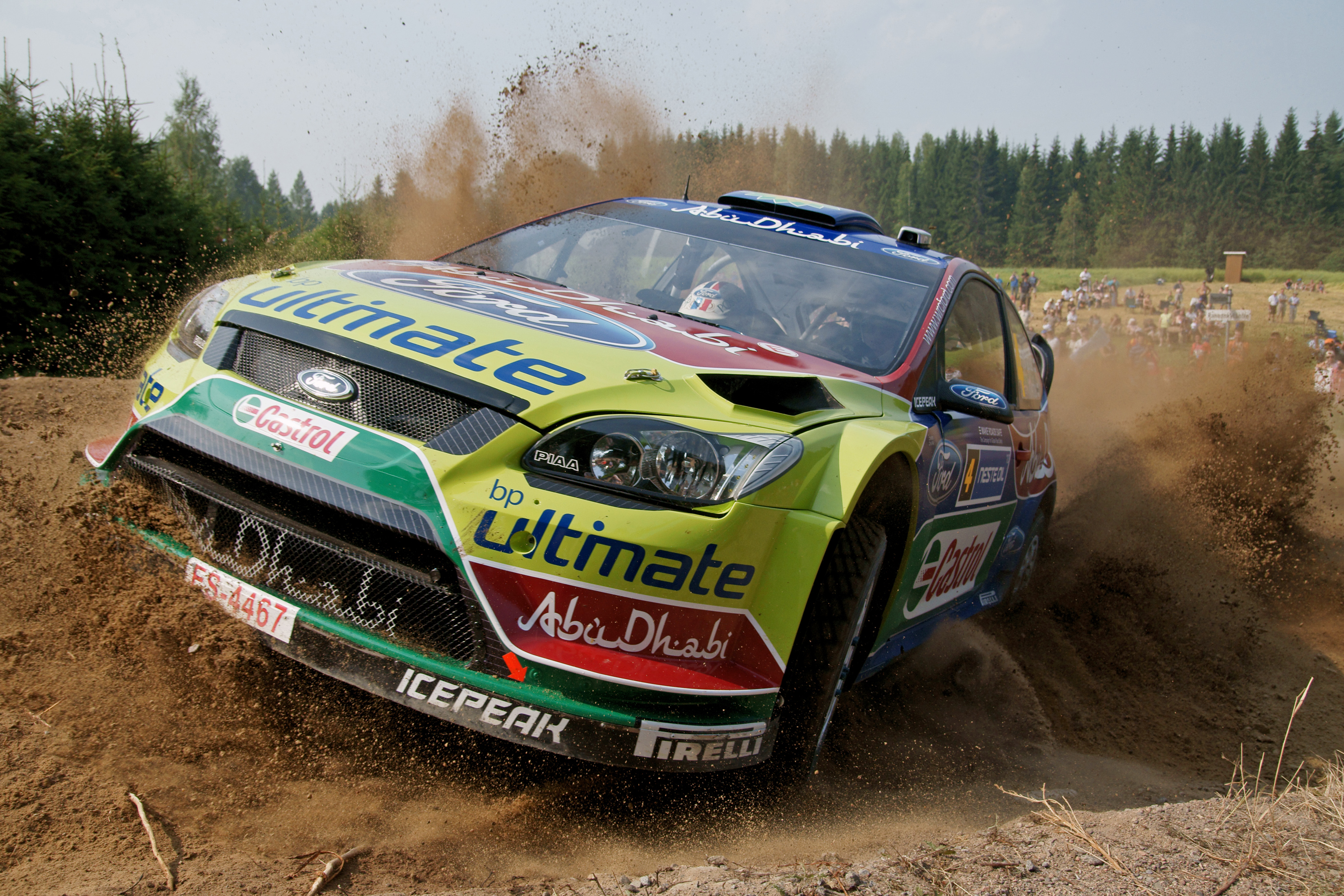
Jari-Matti Latvala, winner of the Neste Oil Rally Finland 2010, driving his car in Muurame shakedown.

Latvala remained with the Ford factory team for 2010. Following his many crashes in 2009, he now had the official position of number two driver whereas in the previous year there was no official distinction between him and his teammate Mikko Hirvonen. After Round 1 in Sweden, Latvala came third. In Mexico, Latvala came fifth and in Round 3 – Rally Jordan, he came second. He crashed on stage 10 in Turkey and he took a dramatic win in New-Zealand. In Round 6, Rally of Portugal, he crashed out and in Bulgaria he was sixth. In this year's eighth round, the Finnish Rally, he claimed his second win of the season, while his teammate Mikko Hirvonen crashed out. Latvala was now ahead of his teammate by 19 points in fourth. After his fourth place in Germany, the third place in Japan and the two fourth places in France and Spain, Latvala managed to finish the season on the podium in Wales. His third place brought him the second place in the overall classification behind record-champion Loeb.

=== 2012 season ===
For 2012, Latvala was promoted to Ford's number one after the departure of Hirvonen to Rival's Citroen Total. For the first round in Monte-Carlo, he took the first stages wins before going off the road at the last stage of day 1, without having rally 2 rules in the event(a.k.a. formidably known as superrally rules) he retired. Round 2 in Sweden and Latvala took his first win of the season and the first as Ford's number one. Mexico saw another retirement of Latvala, and it continued to round 4 in Vodafone Rally de Portugal. He was injured during the testing for the fifth round in Argentina, and was replaced by Prodrive's Dani Sordo, but was able to compete by the next round in Greece.

=== 2013–2016 ===
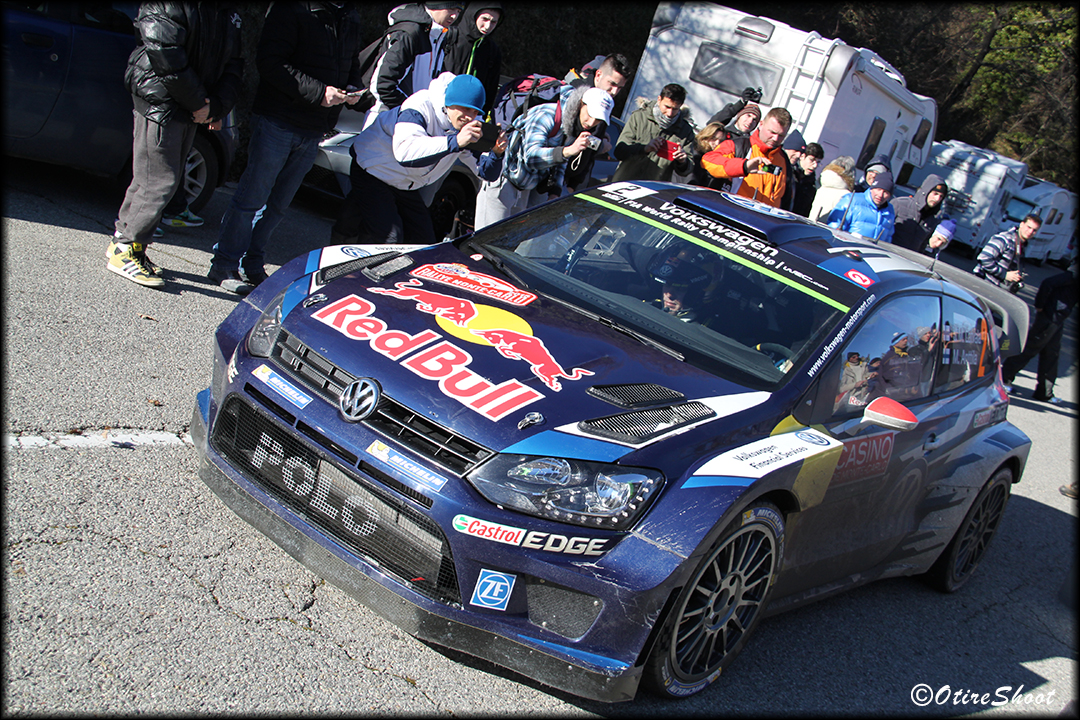
Latvala at the 2015 Monte Carlo Rally

For 2013, Latvala signed a contract with the new Volkswagen WRC team, announced on October 17. He described Ford's decision to end its works programme as the key factor that influenced his decision to change teams. The Finn claimed a win at Greece, and collected seven podiums in 13 races, ranking third in points teammate Ogier and Ford driver Neuville.

In 2014, Latvala won four races at Sweden, Argentina, Finland and Alsace, while collecting eight podiums in 13 races. Therefore, he finished runner-up in the overall standings, behind Ogier who claimed eight wins. In 2015, the driver got three wins at Portugal, Finland and Corsica, while claiming four runner-up finishes. Again he ranked second in points, behind Volkswagen teammate Ogier who won eight races. In 2016, Latvala won at Mexico, and finished second in Italy and Finland, but finished sixth in the overall standings.

=== 2017–2020 ===
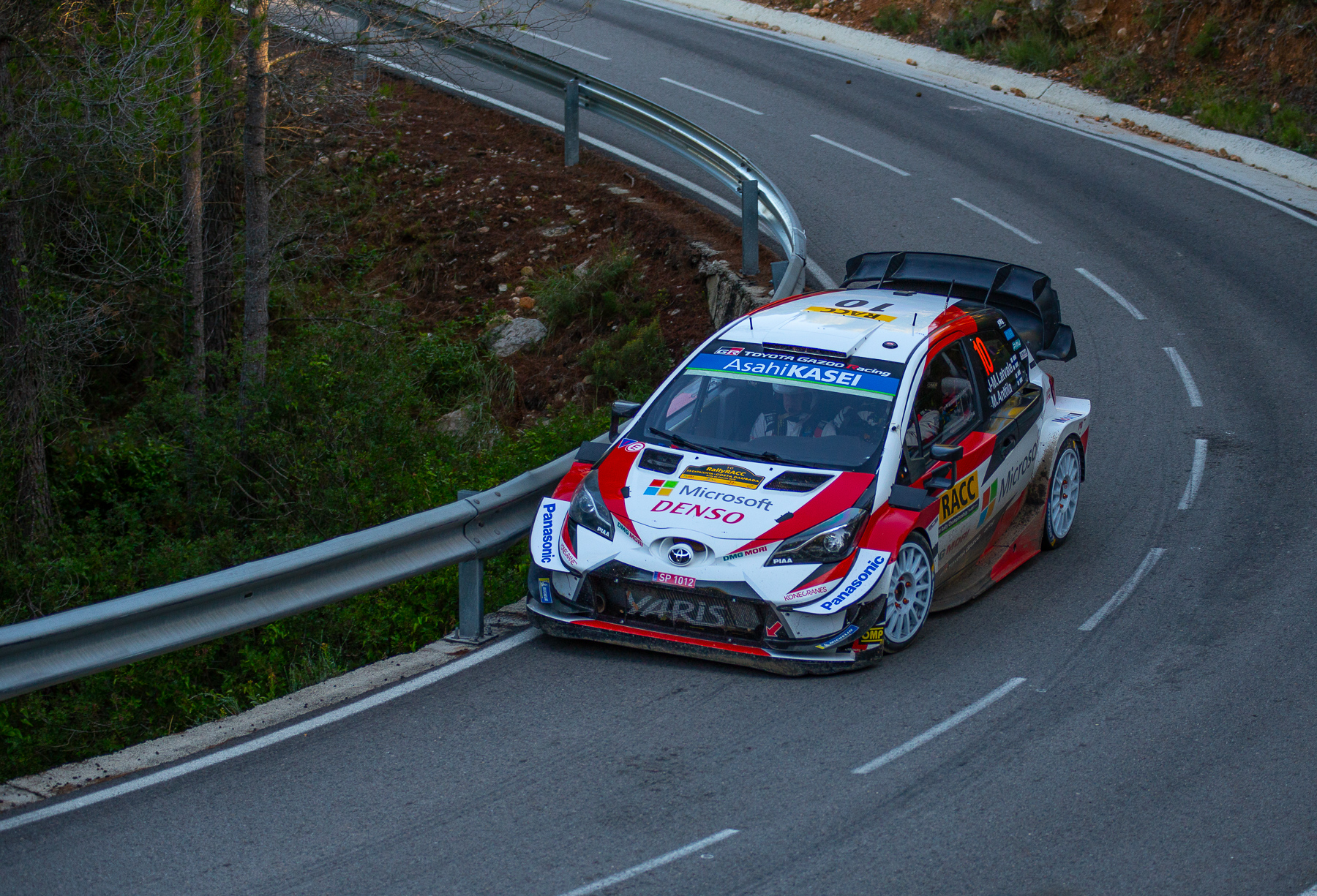
Latvala driving in 2019 Rally Catalunya

Following Volkswagen's withdrawal from the WRC, Latvala and co-driver Miikka Anttila joined the Toyota Gazoo factory team for the 2017 season. He claimed a win at Sweden, second-place finishes at Monte Carlo and Italy, and a fourth-place finish at Corsica. He finished fourth in points, behind Ford drivers Ogier and Ott Tänak, and Hyundai driver Neuville.

The 2018 season started well with third place in Monaco, and ended competitively with four podiums in the last six events, and a win on the final round of the year, Kennards Hire Rally Australia. This was his first victory in 21 months, having made the best of the tricky conditions of the event. He finished fourth in the 2018 driver championship.

For 2019, Latvala remained with the Toyota Gazoo Racing Team. He scored a podium in two events; third place at his home rally in Finland, after colliding with a loose rock during the event. Then third place again at the next round in Germany. Latvala finished the season in seventh position, his lowest since 2007.

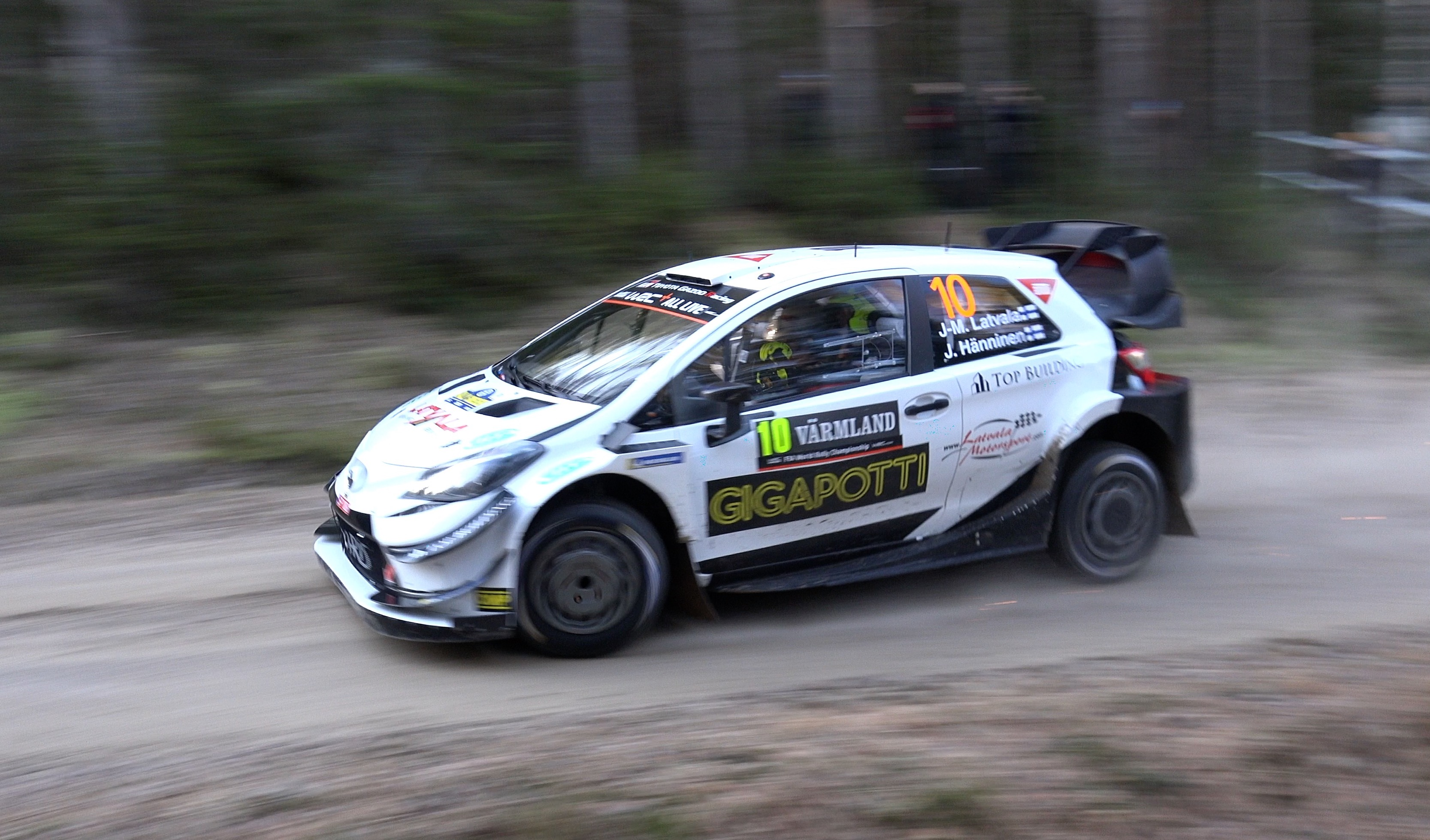
Latvala driving his Toyota Yaris WRC at the 2020 Rally Sweden.

The 2020 driver announcements meant Latvala was struggling to find a seat with Toyota. Failure to secure a deal with M-Sport Ford forced him to look at other options. Latvala was confirmed for two events, Sweden and Finland, in a privately run Toyota Yaris WRC, while looking to finance a further three events at rallying's top level. He is registered under the Latvala Motorsport banner, with Juho Hänninen confirmed as co-driver.

=== 2021 – present ===
On the 18th of December 2020, it was announced Latvala would become Team Principal at Toyota Gazoo Racing in 2021, to replace Tommi Mäkinen.

In 2023, Latvala announced a one-off return to WRC competition at the Rally Finland driving a Toyota GR Yaris Rally1.

Latvala won the 2026 Olympus Rally in a one-off appearance at the American event as part of the development program for Toyota Gazoo Racing's GR Corolla Rally RC2.

== Other ventures ==
=== Latvala Motorsport ===
Latvala also manages the private enterprise Latvala Motorsport with his wife and family, administered from a custom-built location in Tuuri. This is home to a museum of rally cars from his personal collection, memorabilia and official merchandise, a rentable business auditorium, and a rally simulator. The facility is open to the public during the summer months.

== Personal life ==
In 2008, Latvala moved from Finland to Monaco. In 2020, he relocated to Tuuri, Finland.

Latvala was engaged to Finnish celebrity Maisa Torppa from 2017 to 2019.

== WRC victories ==
#	Event	Season	Co-driver	Car
1	(Sweden) 57th Uddeholm Swedish Rally	2008	(Finland) Miikka Anttila	Ford Focus RS WRC 07
2	(Italy) 6º Rally d'Italia Sardegna	2009	(Finland) Miikka Anttila	Ford Focus RS WRC 09
3	40th Rally New Zealand	2010	(Finland) Miikka Anttila	Ford Focus RS WRC 09
4	60º Rally Finland	2010	(Finland) Miikka Anttila	Ford Focus RS WRC 09
5	(United Kingdom) 67th Wales Rally GB	2011	(Finland) Miikka Anttila	Ford Fiesta RS WRC
6	60th Rally Sweden	2012	(Finland) Miikka Anttila	Ford Fiesta RS WRC
7	(United Kingdom) 68th Wales Rally GB	2012	(Finland) Miikka Anttila	Ford Fiesta RS WRC
8	(Greece) 59th Acropolis Rally	2013	(Finland) Miikka Anttila	Volkswagen Polo R WRC
9	62nd Rally Sweden	2014	(Finland) Miikka Anttila	Volkswagen Polo R WRC
10	34th Rally Argentina	2014	(Finland) Miikka Anttila	Volkswagen Polo R WRC
11	64th Rally Finland	2014	(Finland) Miikka Anttila	Volkswagen Polo R WRC
12	Rallye de France-Alsace	2014	(Finland) Miikka Anttila	Volkswagen Polo R WRC
13	49° Vodafone Rally de Portugal	2015	(Finland) Miikka Anttila	Volkswagen Polo R WRC
14	65th Rally Finland	2015	(Finland) Miikka Anttila	Volkswagen Polo R WRC
15	58ème Tour de Corse – Rallye de France	2015	(Finland) Miikka Anttila	Volkswagen Polo R WRC
16	(Mexico) 30° Rally Guanajuato México	2016	(Finland) Miikka Anttila	Volkswagen Polo R WRC
17	65th Rally Sweden	2017	(Finland) Miikka Anttila	Toyota Yaris WRC
18	27th Rally Australia	2018	(Finland) Miikka Anttila	Toyota Yaris WRC

== Results ==
=== WRC results ===
Year	Entrant	Car	1	2	3	4	5	6	7	8	9	10	11	12	13	14	15	16	WDC	Points
2002	Jari-Matti Latvala	Mitsubishi Lancer Evo VI	MON	SWE	FRA	ESP	CYP	ARG	GRE	KEN	FIN	GER	ITA	NZL	AUS	GBR; 17			NC	0
2003	Ford Motor Company	Ford Focus RS WRC 02	MON	SWE	TUR	NZL	ARG	GRE; 10	CYP	GER; 17	FIN; 14	AUS	ITA	FRA	ESP	GBR; 10			NC	0
2004	Jari-Matti Latvala	Ford Puma S1600	MON; Ret																NC	0
2004	Jari-Matti Latvala	Subaru Impreza WRX STI		SWE; Ret	MEX	NZL	CYP					GER; 27	JPN			FRA; 21			NC	0
2004	Jari-Matti Latvala	Ford Fiesta S1600						GRE; Ret	TUR; Ret	ARG									NC	0
2004	Jari-Matti Latvala	Suzuki Ignis S1600									FIN; Ret			GBR; 23	ITA; Ret		ESP; 29		NC	0
2004	Jari-Matti Latvala	Mitsubishi Lancer Evo VIII																AUS; Ret	NC	0
2005	Jari-Matti Latvala	Toyota Corolla WRC	MON	SWE; 16	MEX							FIN; Ret							NC	0
2005	Jari-Matti Latvala	Subaru Impreza WRX STI				NZL; Ret	ITA; 16	CYP	TUR	GRE	ARG; Ret		GER; 21			FRA; 16	ESP; 19	AUS	NC	0
2005	Jari-Matti Latvala	Ford Focus RS WRC												GBR; Ret	JPN				NC	0
2006	Jari-Matti Latvala	Subaru Impreza WRX STI	MON; 41	SWE	MEX; 25					GRE; 22			JPN; 69	CYP	TUR	AUS; 6	NZL; 8		13th	9
2006	Jari-Matti Latvala	Toyota Corolla WRC										FIN; 17							13th	9
2006	Stobart VK Ford Rally Team	Ford Focus RS WRC 04				ESP; 16	FRA; Ret	ARG	ITA		GER; 34								13th	9
2006	Stobart VK Ford Rally Team	Ford Focus RS WRC 06																GBR; 4	13th	9
2007	Stobart VK M-Sport Ford Rally Team	Ford Focus RS WRC 06	MON; Ret	SWE; Ret	NOR; 5	MEX; 7	POR; 8	ARG; 4	ITA; 9	GRE; 12	FIN; Ret	GER; 8	NZL; 5	ESP; 7	FRA; 4	JPN; 25	IRE; 3	GBR; 10	8th	30
2008	BP Ford Abu Dhabi World Rally Team	Ford Focus RS WRC 07	MON; 12	SWE; 1	MEX; 3	ARG; 15	JOR; 7	ITA; 3	GRE; 7	TUR; 2	FIN; 38								4th	58
2008	BP Ford Abu Dhabi World Rally Team	Ford Focus RS WRC 08										GER; 9	NZL; Ret			JPN; 2	GBR; 2		4th	58
2008	Stobart VK M-Sport Ford Rally Team	Ford Focus RS WRC 07												ESP; 6	FRA; 4				4th	58
2009	BP Ford Abu Dhabi World Rally Team	Ford Focus RS WRC 08	IRE; 14	NOR; 3	CYP; 12	POR; Ret	ARG; 6												4th	41
2009	BP Ford Abu Dhabi World Rally Team	Ford Focus RS WRC 09						ITA; 1	GRE; 3	POL; Ret	FIN; 3	AUS; 4	ESP; 6	GBR; 7					4th	41
2010	BP Ford Abu Dhabi World Rally Team	Ford Focus RS WRC 09	SWE; 3	MEX; 5	JOR; 2	TUR; 8	NZL; 1	POR; Ret	BUL; 6	FIN; 1	GER; 4	JPN; 3	FRA; 4	ESP; 4	GBR; 3				2nd	171
2011	Ford Abu Dhabi World Rally Team	Ford Fiesta RS WRC	SWE; 3	MEX; 3	POR; 3	JOR; 2	ITA; 18	ARG; 7	GRE; 9	FIN; 2	GER; 14	AUS; 2	FRA; 4	ESP; 3	GBR; 1				4th	172
2012	Ford World Rally Team	Ford Fiesta RS WRC	MON; Ret	SWE; 1	MEX; Ret	POR; 13	ARG	GRE; 3	NZL; 7	FIN; 3	GER; 2	GBR; 1	FRA; 2	ITA; 12	ESP; 2				3rd	154
2013	Volkswagen Motorsport	Volkswagen Polo R WRC	MON; Ret	SWE; 4	MEX; 16	POR; 3	ARG; 3	GRE; 1	ITA; 3	FIN; 17	GER; 7	AUS; 4	FRA; 3	ESP; 2	GBR; 2				3rd	162
2014	Volkswagen Motorsport	Volkswagen Polo R WRC	MON; 5	SWE; 1	MEX; 2	POR; 14	ARG; 1	ITA; 3	POL; 5	FIN; 1	GER; Ret	AUS; 2	FRA; 1	ESP; 2	GBR; 8				2nd	218
2015	Volkswagen Motorsport	Volkswagen Polo R WRC	MON; 2	SWE; Ret	MEX; 15	ARG; Ret	POR; 1	ITA; 6	POL; 5	FIN; 1	GER; 2	AUS; 2	FRA; 1	ESP; 2	GBR; 50				2nd	183
2016	Volkswagen Motorsport	Volkswagen Polo R WRC	MON; Ret	SWE; 26	MEX; 1	ARG; 16	POR; 6	ITA; 2	POL; 5	FIN; 2	GER; 48	CHN; C	FRA; 4	ESP; 14	GBR; 7	AUS; 9			6th	112
2017	Toyota Gazoo Racing WRT	Toyota Yaris WRC	MON; 2	SWE; 1	MEX; 6	FRA; 4	ARG; 5	POR; 9	ITA; 2	POL; 20	FIN; 21	GER; 7	ESP; Ret	GBR; 5	AUS; Ret				4th	136
2018	Toyota Gazoo Racing WRT	Toyota Yaris WRC	MON; 3	SWE; 7	MEX; 8	FRA; Ret	ARG; Ret	POR; 24	ITA; 7	FIN; 3	GER; Ret	TUR; 2	GBR; 2	ESP; 8	AUS; 1				4th	128
2019	Toyota Gazoo Racing WRT	Toyota Yaris WRC	MON; 5	SWE; 21	MEX; 8	FRA; 10	ARG; 5	CHL; 11	POR; 7	ITA; 19	FIN; 3	GER; 3	TUR; 6	GBR; Ret	ESP; 5	AUS; C			7th	94
2020	Latvala Motorsport	Toyota Yaris WRC	MON	SWE; Ret	MEX	EST	TUR	ITA	MNZ										NC	0
2023	Toyota Gazoo Racing WRT	Toyota GR Yaris Rally1	MON	SWE	MEX	CRO	POR	ITA	KEN	EST	FIN; 5	GRE	CHL	EUR	JPN				16th	11
2024	Toyota Gazoo Racing WRT	Toyota GR Yaris Rally2	MON	SWE	KEN	CRO	POR	ITA	POL	LAT	FIN; 6	GRE	CHL	EUR	JPN				21st	6
2025	JML-WRT Oy	Toyota GR Yaris Rally2	MON	SWE	KEN	ESP	POR	ITA	GRE	EST	FIN; 12	PAR	CHL	EUR	JPN	SAU			NC	0
2026	JML-WRT Oy	Toyota GR Yaris Rally2	MON	SWE	KEN	CRO	ESP	POR	JPN	GRE	EST	FIN; 8	PAR	CHL	ITA	SAU			24th*	4*

* Season still in progress.

=== JWRC results ===
Year	Entrant	Car	1	2	3	4	5	6	7	Pos.	Points
2004	Jari-Matti Latvala	Ford Puma S1600	MON; Ret							13th	5
2004	Jari-Matti Latvala	Ford Fiesta S1600		GRE; Ret	TUR; Ret					13th	5
2004	Jari-Matti Latvala	Suzuki Ignis S1600				FIN; Ret	GBR; 4	ITA; Ret	ESP; 9	13th	5

=== PWRC results ===
Year	Entrant	Car	1	2	3	4	5	6	7	8	Pos.	Points
2006	Jari-Matti Latvala	Subaru Impreza WRX STI	MON; 5	MEX; 9	ARG	GRE; 6	JPN; 9	CYP	AUS; 1	NZL; 1	4th	27

Records
Preceded by Henri Toivonen; 24 years, 86 days (1980 RAC Rally)	Youngest rally winner 22 years, 313 days (2008 Swedish Rally)	Succeeded by Kalle Rovanperä; 20 years, 290 days (2021 Rally Estonia)
Preceded by Carlos Sainz; 196 starts (1987–2005)	Most rally starts 210 starts (2002–2023); 197th at the 2019 Rally Sweden	Succeeded by Incumbent
