= 2011 Rally Australia =

2011 Rally Australia 21st Rally Australia
Round 10 of the 2011 World Rally Championship season
← Previous event	Next event →
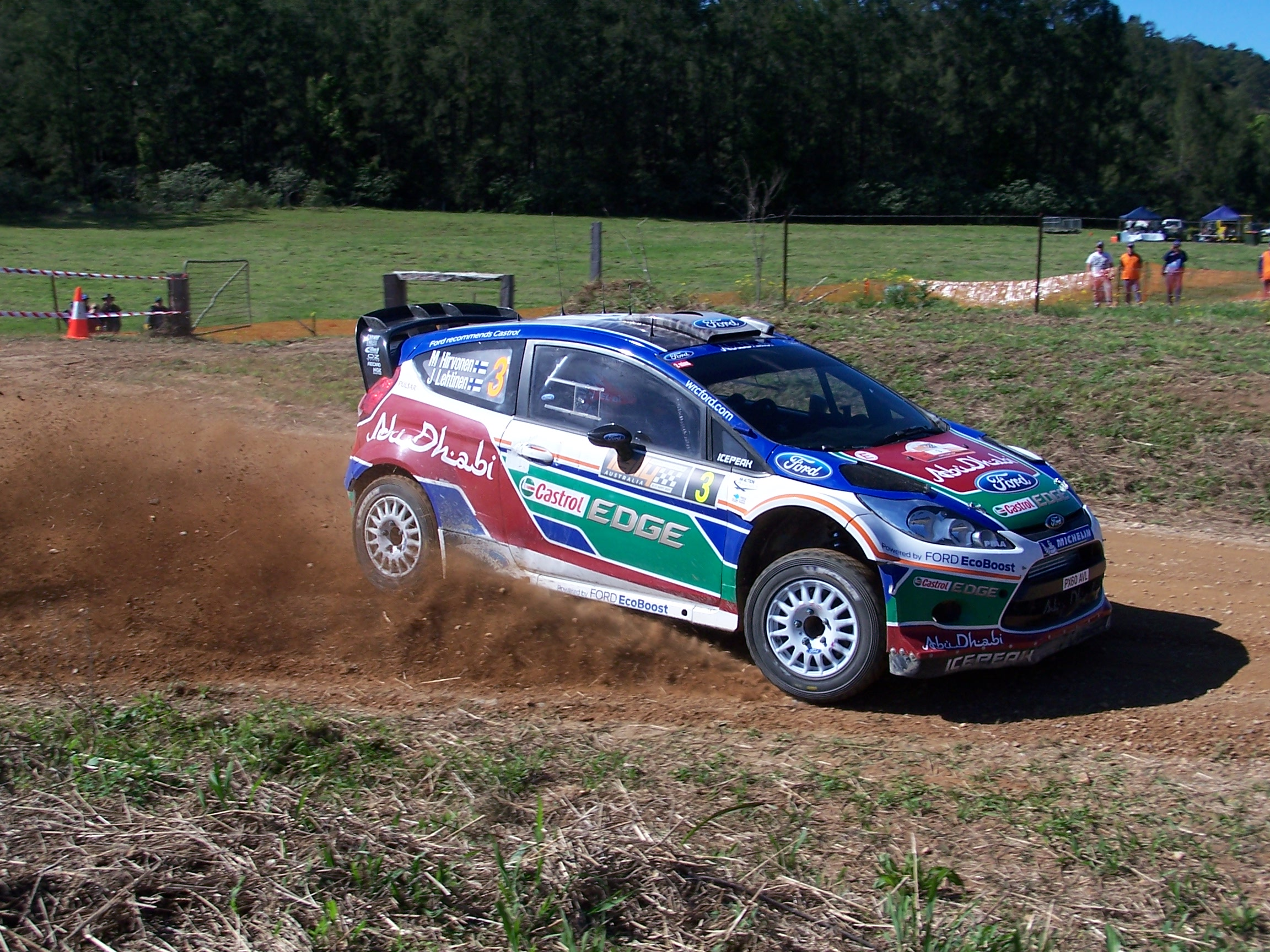
- Eventual winner Mikko Hirvonen during a stage
- Host country: Australia
- Rally base: Coffs Harbour, New South Wales
- Dates run: 8 September – 11 2011
- Stages: 26 (368.96 km; 229.26 miles)
- Stage surface: Gravel
- Overall distance: 1,246.78 km (774.71 miles)

Statistics
- Crews: 29 at start, 24 at finish

Overall results
- Overall winner: (Finland) Mikko Hirvonen (United Kingdom) Ford World Rally Team

The 2011 Rally Australia was the 21st Rally Australia and the tenth round of the 2011 World Rally Championship season. The rally took place over 8–11 September, and was based in Coffs Harbour, a coastal city in the New South Wales state of Australia. The rally was also the fifth round of the Production World Rally Championship. Rally Australia returned to the WRC calendar after a year's hiatus, and after demonstrations marred the 2009 running of the rally, held north of Coffs Harbour in the Northern Rivers area. Residents' concerns for the event meant that the rally was moved for the foreseeable future to Coffs Harbour.

Ford World Rally Team's Mikko Hirvonen took his third successive Rally Australia victory, after team-mate Jari-Matti Latvala slowed tactically on the penultimate stage, in order to aid Hirvonen's chances for the drivers' championship title. The Ford drivers had moved into the top two placings on the opening day of the rally after Citroën's Sébastien Loeb and Sébastien Ogier both had to retire from the day's proceedings and return to the rally the following day under the SupeRally regulations. Loeb recovered to score a tenth-place finish with the Power Stage victory, to extend his championship by four points over Ogier, who slowed on the last two stages to drop from eighth to eleventh behind Loeb.

Petter Solberg finished third behind the Ford pairing, 44.8 seconds in arrears, but finished over seven minutes clear of the fourth-placed driver Matthew Wilson, who matched his career-best placing from Rally Japan in 2007. Khalid Al Qassimi scored a career-best fifth place, ahead of a quartet of PWRC competitors. Hayden Paddon was the best of the PWRC competitors with sixth place overall, securing his fourth PWRC victory in succession, and the championship title as Martin Semerád – who elected not to compete at the event – could only tie Paddon on points and lose on countback. Michał Kościuszko, Oleksandr Saliuk, Jr. and Benito Guerra also scored overall championship points by finishing in the top ten.

== Results ==
=== Event standings ===
Pos.	Driver	Co-driver	Car	Time	Difference	Points
1.	(Finland) Mikko Hirvonen	(Finland) Jarmo Lehtinen	Ford Fiesta RS WRC	3:35:59.0	0.0	25
2.	(Finland) Jari-Matti Latvala	(Finland) Miikka Anttila	Ford Fiesta RS WRC	3:36:13.7	14.7	20
3.	(Norway) Petter Solberg	(United Kingdom) Chris Patterson	Citroën DS3 WRC	3:36:43.8	44.8	16
4.	(United Kingdom) Matthew Wilson	(United Kingdom) Scott Martin	Ford Fiesta RS WRC	3:44:44.2	8:45.2	12
5.	(United Arab Emirates) Khalid Al Qassimi	(United Kingdom) Michael Orr	Ford Fiesta RS WRC	3:48:32.3	12:33.3	10
6.	(New Zealand) Hayden Paddon	(New Zealand) John Kennard	Subaru Impreza WRX STI	3:53:28.3	17:29.3	8
7.	(Poland) Michał Kościuszko	(Poland) Maciej Szczepaniak	Mitsubishi Lancer Evolution X	3:55:00.3	19:01.3	6
8.	(Ukraine) Oleksandr Saliuk, Jr.	(Ukraine) Pavlo Cherepin	Mitsubishi Lancer Evolution IX	3:57:07.5	21:08.5	4
9.	(Mexico) Benito Guerra	(Spain) Borja Rozada	Mitsubishi Lancer Evolution X	3:58:47.9	22:48.9	2
10.	(France) Sébastien Loeb	(Monaco) Daniel Elena	Citroën DS3 WRC	4:06:01.9	30:02.9	4
PWRC
1. (6.)	(New Zealand) Hayden Paddon	(New Zealand) John Kennard	Subaru Impreza WRX STI	3:53:28.3	0.0	25
2. (7.)	(Poland) Michał Kościuszko	(Poland) Maciej Szczepaniak	Mitsubishi Lancer Evolution X	3:55:00.3	1:32.0	18
3. (8.)	(Ukraine) Oleksandr Saliuk, Jr.	(Ukraine) Pavlo Cherepin	Mitsubishi Lancer Evolution IX	3:57:07.5	3:39.2	15
4. (9.)	(Mexico) Benito Guerra	(Spain) Borja Rozada	Mitsubishi Lancer Evolution X	3:58:47.9	5:19.6	12
5. (12.)	(Ukraine) Valeriy Gorban	(Ukraine) Andrey Nikolayev	Mitsubishi Lancer Evolution IX	4:06:21.1	12:52.8	10
6. (16.)	(Italy) Gianluca Linari	(Italy) Nicola Arena	Subaru Impreza WRX STI	4:14:49.2	21:20.9	8
7. (17.)	(Australia) Brendan Reeves	(Australia) Rhianon Smyth	Subaru Impreza WRX STI	4:17:19.2	23:50.9	6
8. (18.)	(Australia) Nathan Quinn	(Australia) David Green	Mitsubishi Lancer Evolution IX	4:17:53.6	24:25.3	4
9. (20.)	(United Kingdom) Harry Hunt	(United Kingdom) Robbie Durant	Citroën DS3 R3	4:25:40.9	32:12.6	2
10. (21.)	(United Arab Emirates) Bader Al Jabri	(Republic of Ireland) Stephen McAuley	Subaru Impreza WRX STI	4:29:41.2	36:12.9	1

=== Special stages ===
Day	Stage	Time	Name	Length	Winner	Time	Avg. spd.	Rally leader
Leg 1 (8–9 September)	SS1	19:15	Coffs Jetty Precinct 1	3.77 km	(France) Sébastien Ogier	2:46.1	81.71 km/h	(France) Sébastien Ogier
Leg 1 (8–9 September)	SS2	19:30	Coffs Jetty Precinct 2	3.77 km	(France) Sébastien Loeb	2:41.1	84.25 km/h	(France) Sébastien Ogier
Leg 1 (8–9 September)	SS3	10:03	Shipmans 1	29.03 km	(France) Sébastien Loeb	15:17.0	113.97 km/h	(France) Sébastien Loeb
Leg 1 (8–9 September)	SS4	10:58	Brooklana 1	12.78 km	(Norway) Petter Solberg	10:01.9	76.44 km/h	(France) Sébastien Ogier
Leg 1 (8–9 September)	SS5	11:29	Ulong 1	12.45 km	(Finland) Jari-Matti Latvala	6:37.9	112.64 km/h	(France) Sébastien Ogier
Leg 1 (8–9 September)	SS6	14:42	Shipmans 2	29.03 km	(Finland) Jari-Matti Latvala	16:15.2	107.17 km/h	(Finland) Mikko Hirvonen
Leg 1 (8–9 September)	SS7	15:37	Brooklana 2	12.78 km	(Finland) Mikko Hirvonen	10:23.1	73.84 km/h	(Finland) Mikko Hirvonen
Leg 1 (8–9 September)	SS8	16:08	Ulong 2	12.45 km	(Finland) Jari-Matti Latvala	6:55.1	107.97 km/h	(Finland) Mikko Hirvonen
Leg 1 (8–9 September)	SS9	18:30	Coffs Jetty Precinct 3	3.77 km	(Finland) Jari-Matti Latvala	2:51.0	79.37 km/h	(Finland) Mikko Hirvonen
Leg 1 (8–9 September)	SS10	18:45	Coffs Jetty Precinct 4	3.77 km	(Finland) Mikko Hirvonen	2:49.9	79.88 km/h	(Finland) Mikko Hirvonen
Leg 2 (10 September)	SS11	8:33	Welshes 1	21.10 km	(Finland) Jari-Matti Latvala	12:10.2	104.03 km/h	(Finland) Jari-Matti Latvala
Leg 2 (10 September)	SS12	9:21	Grace 1	19.77 km	(Finland) Jari-Matti Latvala	11:10.9	106.08 km/h	(Finland) Jari-Matti Latvala
Leg 2 (10 September)	SS13	10:14	Valla 1	14.84 km	(Finland) Jari-Matti Latvala	8:56.2	99.63 km/h	(Finland) Jari-Matti Latvala
Leg 2 (10 September)	SS14	10:54	Urunga 1	13.79 km	(Finland) Jari-Matti Latvala	8:41.8	95.14 km/h	(Finland) Jari-Matti Latvala
Leg 2 (10 September)	SS15	14:02	Welshes 2	21.10 km	(France) Sébastien Ogier	11:55.2	106.21 km/h	(Finland) Jari-Matti Latvala
Leg 2 (10 September)	SS16	14:50	Grace 2	19.77 km	(France) Sébastien Ogier	10:56.0	108.49 km/h	(Finland) Jari-Matti Latvala
Leg 2 (10 September)	SS17	15:43	Valla 2	14.84 km	(France) Sébastien Ogier	8:39.7	102.80 km/h	(Finland) Jari-Matti Latvala
Leg 2 (10 September)	SS18	16:23	Urunga 2	13.79 km	(France) Sébastien Loeb	8:28.8	97.57 km/h	(Finland) Jari-Matti Latvala
Leg 2 (10 September)	SS19	18:30	Coffs Jetty Precinct 5	3.77 km	(France) Sébastien Loeb	2:34.9	87.62 km/h	(Finland) Jari-Matti Latvala
Leg 2 (10 September)	SS20	18:45	Coffs Jetty Precinct 6	3.77 km	(France) Sébastien Ogier	2:33.8	88.24 km/h	(Finland) Jari-Matti Latvala
Leg 3 (11 September)	SS21	6:56	Bucca 1	14.83 km	(Finland) Mikko Hirvonen	7:18.3	121.81 km/h	(Finland) Jari-Matti Latvala
Leg 3 (11 September)	SS22	8:19	Plum Pudding 1	30.00 km	(Finland) Jari-Matti Latvala	16:26.3	109.50 km/h	(Finland) Jari-Matti Latvala
Leg 3 (11 September)	SS23	9:32	Clarence 1	4.58 km	(France) Sébastien Loeb	2:22.8	115.46 km/h	(Finland) Jari-Matti Latvala
Leg 3 (11 September)	SS24	12:03	Bucca 2	14.83 km	(Finland) Mikko Hirvonen	7:10.6	123.99 km/h	(Finland) Jari-Matti Latvala
Leg 3 (11 September)	SS25	13:26	Plum Pudding 2	30.00 km	(Finland) Mikko Hirvonen	16:07.8	111.59 km/h	(Finland) Mikko Hirvonen
Leg 3 (11 September)	SS26	15:30	Clarence 2 (Power stage)	4.58 km	(France) Sébastien Loeb	2:18.1	119.39 km/h	(Finland) Mikko Hirvonen

=== Power stage ===
The "Power stage" was a live, televised 4.58 km (2.85 mi) stage at the end of the rally, held in Clarence.

Pos	Driver	Time	Diff.	Avg. speed	Points
1	(France) Sébastien Loeb	2:18.1	0.0	119.39 km/h	3
2	(Finland) Jari-Matti Latvala	2:19.3	+1.2	118.36 km/h	2
3	(Norway) Petter Solberg	2:19.4	+1.3	118.28 km/h	1

== Standings after the race ==
Drivers' Championship standings

Pos	Driver	Points
1	(France) Sébastien Loeb	196
2	(Finland) Mikko Hirvonen	181
3	(France) Sebastien Ogier	168
4	(Finland) Jari-Matti Latvala	119
5	(Norway) Petter Solberg	110

Constructors' Championship standings

Pos	Constructor	Points
1	(France) Citroen Total World Rally Team	347
2	(United Kingdom) Ford Abu Dhabi World Rally Team	285
3	(United Kingdom) M-Sport Stobart Ford World Rally Team	117
4	(Norway) Petter Solberg World Rally Team	98
5	(Finland) Ice 1 Racing	48

- **Bold text** indicates World Champion.
- Note: Only the top five positions are included for both sets of standings.
