= Matti Rantanen (rally driver) =

Finnish rally driver (born 1981)

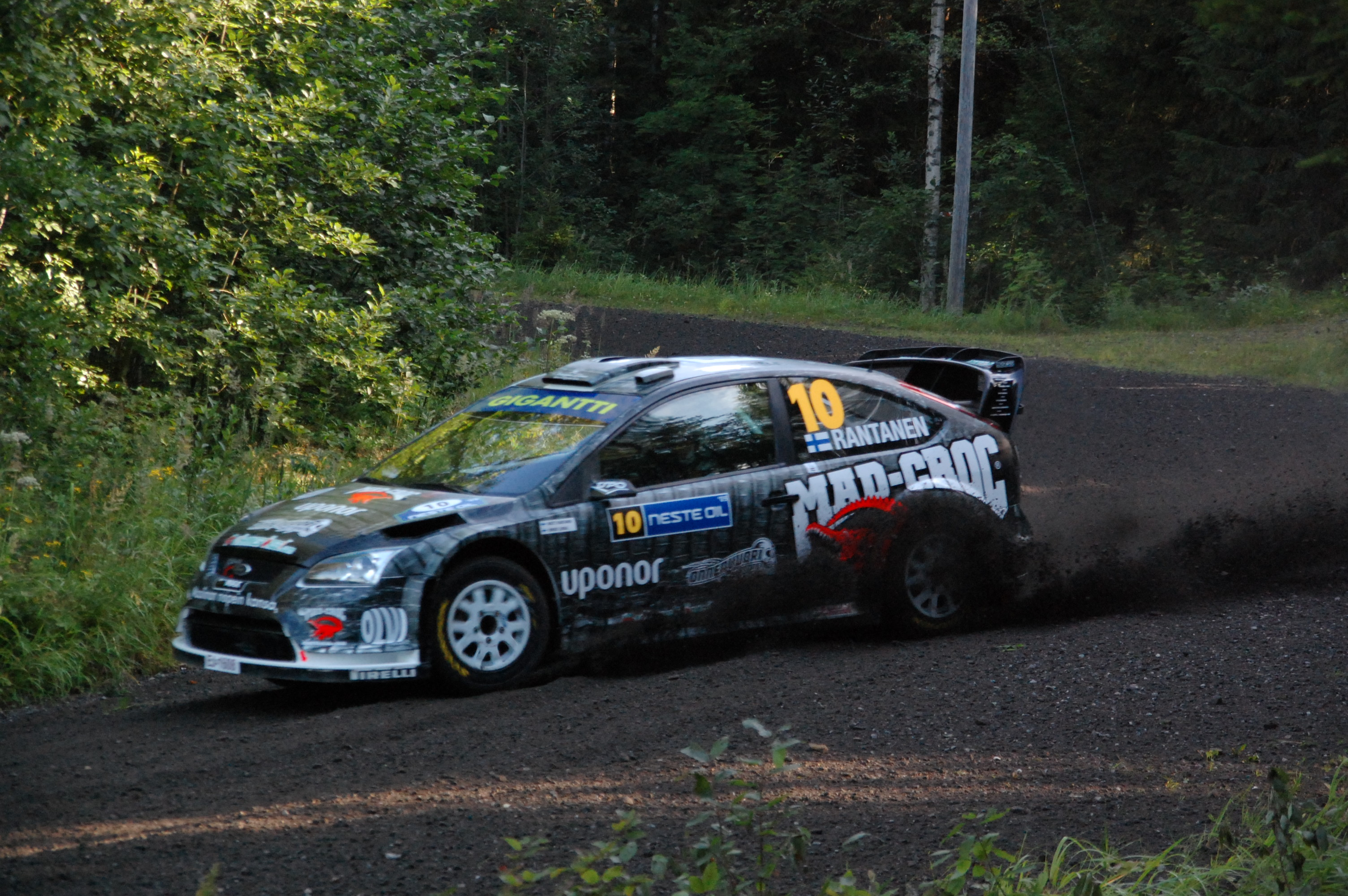

Personal information
- Nationality: (Finland) Finnish
- Born: 13 February 1981 (age 45)

World Rally Championship record
- Years active: 2005–2012
- Co-driver: (Finland) Jan Lönegren (Finland) Mikko Lukka
- Teams: Munchi's
- Rallies: 8
- Championships: 0
- Rally wins: 0
- Podiums: 0
- Stage wins: 0
- Total points: 12
- First rally: 2005 Rally Finland
- Last rally: 2012 Rally Finland

Matti Rantanen (born 13 February 1981) is a Finnish rally driver from Lammi.

== Career ==
Rantanen began rallying in 2003 in his native Finland. In 2004 and 2005 he competed in the Finnish Junior Rally Championship, and the main Finnish Rally Championship in 2005 and 2006. In 2005 he competed in his first World Rally Championship round on Rally Finland, winning the Group N category (for less powerful Group N cars). He repeated this feat in 2006, also winning the Group N class in the Finnish Rally Championship. He moved up to the Group N category in the Finnish championship in 2007, finishing sixth. He finished fourth in the following year, 2008. On the 2008 Rally Finland, Rantanen drove a Ford Focus WRC to seventh overall.

In 2009, Rantanen competed in the British Rally Championship in a front-wheel-drive Renault Clio. He competed in the 2009 Rally Finland for the Munchi's Ford World Rally Team, in which he recorded his highest finish to date after finishing in fifth place overall.

== Complete WRC results ==
Year	Entrant	Car	1	2	3	4	5	6	7	8	9	10	11	12	13	14	15	16	WDC	Points
2005	Matti Rantanen	Honda Civic Type R	MON	SWE	MEX	NZL	ITA	CYP	TUR	GRC	ARG	FIN; 31	GER	GBR	JPN	FRA	ESP	AUS	NC	0
2006	Matti Rantanen	Honda Civic Type R	MON	SWE	MEX	ESP	FRA	ARG	ITA	GRC	GER	FIN; 21	JPN	CYP	TUR	AUS	NZL	GBR	NC	0
2007	Matti Rantanen	Mitsubishi Lancer Evo VIII	MON	SWE	NOR	MEX	POR	ARG	ITA	GRC	FIN; Ret	GER	NZL	ESP	FRA	JPN	IRE	GBR	NC	0
2008	Matti Rantanen	Ford Focus RS WRC 06	MON	SWE	MEX	ARG	JOR	ITA	GRC	TUR	FIN; 7	GER	NZL	ESP	FRA	JPN	GBR		18th	2
2009	Munchi's Ford World Rally Team	Ford Focus RS WRC 08	IRE	NOR	CYP	POR	ARG	ITA	GRC	POL	FIN; 5	AUS	ESP	GBR					15th	4
2010	Matti Rantanen	Škoda Fabia S2000	SWE	MEX	JOR	TUR	NZL	POR	BUL	FIN; Ret	GER	JPN	FRA	ESP	GBR				NC	0
2011	Matti Rantanen	Mini John Cooper Works WRC	SWE	MEX	POR	JOR	ITA	ARG	GRE	FIN; Ret	GER	AUS	FRA	ESP	GBR				NC	0
2012	Matti Rantanen	Ford Fiesta RS WRC	MON	SWE	MEX	POR	ARG	GRE	NZL	FIN; 7	GER	GBR	FRA	ITA	ESP				22nd	6

=== JWRC results ===
Year	Entrant	Car	1	2	3	4	5	6	7	8	9	Pos.	Points
2006	Matti Rantanen	Honda Civic Type R	SWE	ESP	FRA	ARG	ITA	GER	FIN; 3	TUR	GBR	17th	6

=== SWRC results ===
Year	Entrant	Car	1	2	3	4	5	6	7	8	9	10	Pos.	Points
2010	Matti Rantanen	Škoda Fabia S2000	SWE	MEX	JOR	NZL	POR	FIN; Ret	GER	JPN	FRA	GBR	NC	0
