= Jaan Mölder =

Estonian rally driver (born 1987)

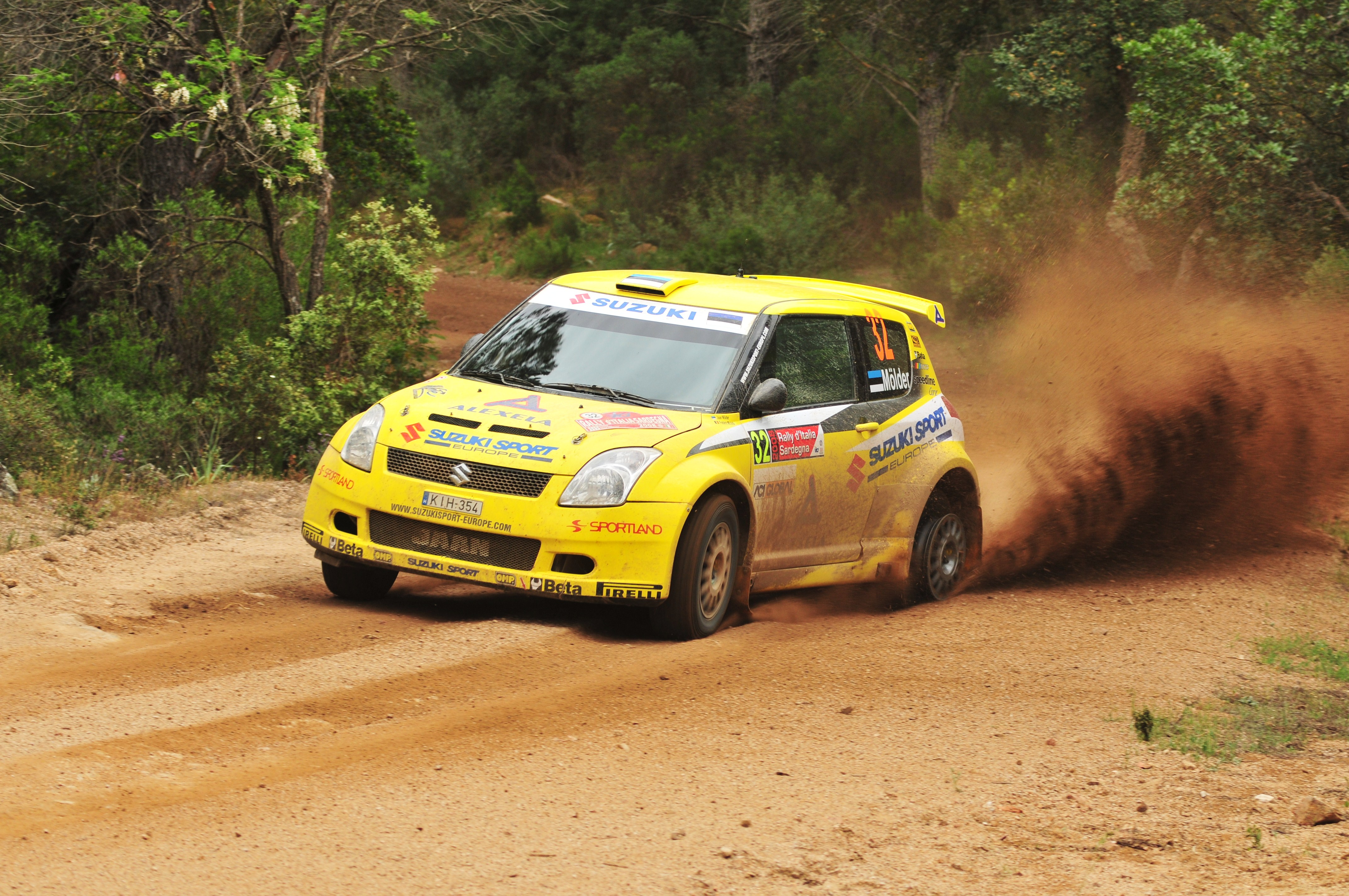
- Mölder on the 2008 Rally d'Italia Sardegna.

Personal information
- Nationality: (Estonia) Estonian
- Born: June 9, 1987 (age 39); Tartu, then part of Estonian SSR, Soviet Union

World Rally Championship record
- Years active: 2005 – 2008
- Co-driver: (Estonia) Tõnu Vunn (Germany) Katrin Becker (Belgium) Frédéric Miclotte
- Rallies: 21
- Championships: 0
- Rally wins: 0
- Podiums: 0
- Stage wins: 0
- Total points: 0
- First rally: 2005 Swedish Rally
- Last rally: 2008 Tour de Corse

Jaan Mölder (born 9 June 1987) is an Estonian former rally driver.

Mölder took part in 21 World Rally Championship events from 2005 to 2008. He won first place at the 2006 Junior WRC in Wales, and is a 5-time winner of the Estonian Rally Championship.

== WRC results ==
Year	Entrant	Car	1	2	3	4	5	6	7	8	9	10	11	12	13	14	15	16	WDC	Points
2005	Jaan Mölder	Mitsubishi Lancer Evo VI	MON	SWE; Ret	MEX	NZL	ITA	CYP	TUR	GRE; Ret	ARG	FIN	GER		JPN	FRA	ESP	AUS	-	0
2005	Jaan Mölder	Mitsubishi Lancer Evo VIII												GBR; 27					-	0
2006	Jaan Mölder	Ford Fiesta S1600	MON	SWE; 40	MEX	ESP	FRA	ARG; 45											-	0
2006	Jaan Mölder	Suzuki Swift S1600							ITA; 44	GRE	GER	FIN; 28	JPN	CYP	TUR; Ret	AUS	NZL	GBR; 20	-	0
2007	Jaan Mölder	Suzuki Swift S1600	MON	SWE	NOR; 31	MEX	POR; 21	ARG	ITA; 19	GRE	FIN; 47	GER; 27	NZL	ESP; 26	FRA	JPN	IRE	GBR	-	0
2008	Jaan Mölder	Suzuki Swift S1600	MON	SWE	MEX; 9	ARG	JOR; Ret	ITA; 28	GRE	TUR	FIN; Ret	GER	NZL	ESP; 24	FRA; 36	JPN	GBR		-	0

=== JWRC results ===
Year	Entrant	Car	1	2	3	4	5	6	7	8	9	Pos.	Points
2006	Jaan Mölder	Suzuki Swift S1600	SWE; 10	ESP	FRA	ARG; 4	ITA; 12	GER	FIN; 6	TUR; Ret	GBR; 1	9th	18
2007	Jaan Mölder	Suzuki Swift S1600	NOR; 4	POR; 4	ITA; 5	FIN; 13	GER; 6	ESP; 6	FRA			5th	20
2008	Jaan Mölder	Suzuki Swift S1600	MEX; 2	JOR; Ret	ITA; 9	FIN; Ret	GER	ESP; 6	FRA; 11			8th	11
