= Mirco Baldacci =

Sammarinese rally driver (born 1977)

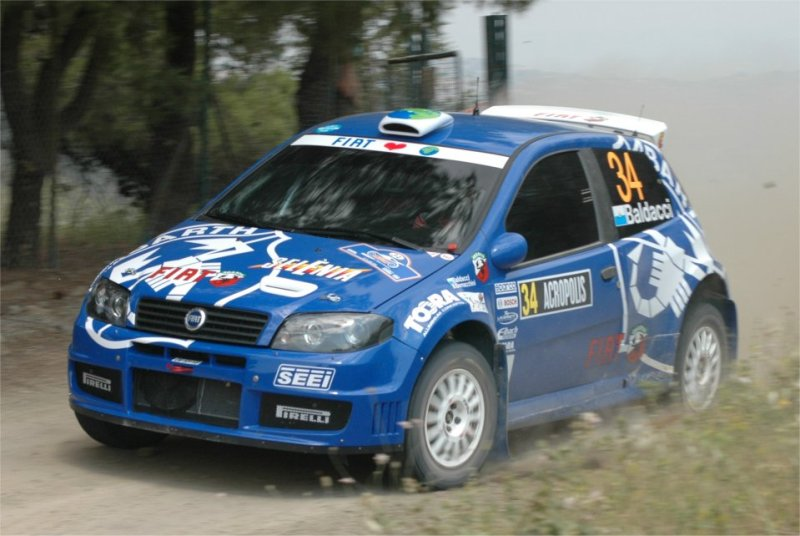
- Baldacci during the 2005 Acropolis Rally.

Personal information
- Nationality: (San Marino) Sammarinese
- Born: September 19, 1977 (age 49)

World Rally Championship record
- Years active: 2000–2008
- Co-driver: (Italy) Maurizio Barone (Italy) Giovanni Bernacchini (Italy) Giovanni Agnese
- Rallies: 58
- Championships: 0
- Rally wins: 0
- Podiums: 0
- Stage wins: 0
- Total points: 2
- First rally: 2000 Rallye Sanremo
- Last rally: 2008 Wales Rally GB

Mirco Baldacci (born 19 September 1977) is a rally driver from San Marino, who scored two World Rally Championship points by finishing seventh on the 2006 Rally Australia. His younger brother Loris Baldacci also raced in WRC from 2005 to 2008.

== Career ==
Baldacci made his World Rally Championship debut on Rallye Sanremo in 2000 behind the wheel of a Renault Clio Williams. In 2001, he contested five rounds of the Production World Rally Championship in a Mitsubishi Lancer Evo VI. In 2002, he contested the Junior World Rally Championship in a Citroën Saxo S1600, finishing fourth in class on Rallye Deutschland and 13th in the final standings.

Baldacci switched to a Fiat Punto for the 2003 JWRC, winning his class in Sanremo and ending the year fifth overall. For 2004, he switched to a Suzuki Ignis, again finishing fifth overall. He also entered four other WRC events in a Group N Mitsubishi, finishing as high as tenth overall on Rally Australia. He used a Punto again in the 2005 JWRC, winning on the Tour de Corse and finishing seventh in the final standings.

Baldacci returned to the PWRC for 2006, using a Mitsubishi Lancer Evo IX, finishing third in the final standings. He finished second in PWRC in Australia, seventh overall. Switching to a Subaru Impreza WRX STi for 2007, he ended the year sixth in PWRC. He returned to using an Evo IX in 2008, but four retirements from six rallies left him down in 11th overall.

== WRC results ==
Year	Entrant	Car	1	2	3	4	5	6	7	8	9	10	11	12	13	14	15	16	WDC	Points
2000	Mirco Baldacci	Renault Clio Williams	MON	SWE	KEN	POR	ESP	ARG	GRE	NZL	FIN	CYP	FRA	ITA; Ret	AUS	GBR; 49			NC	0
2001	Mirco Baldacci	Mitsubishi Lancer Evo VI	MON	SWE	POR; 19	ESP	ARG	CYP; Ret	GRE; 17	KEN	FIN; 45	NZL	ITA	FRA	AUS	GBR; Ret			NC	0
2002	Mirco Baldacci	Citroën Saxo S1600	MON; Ret	SWE	FRA	ESP; Ret	CYP	ARG	GRE; Ret	KEN	FIN	GER; 18	ITA; 27	NZL	AUS	GBR; Ret			NC	0
2003	Mirco Baldacci	Fiat Punto S1600	MON; 23	SWE	TUR; Ret	NZL	ARG	GRE; Ret	CYP	GER	FIN; Ret	AUS	ITA; 16	FRA	ESP; Ret	GBR; 15			NC	0
2004	Mirco Baldacci	Suzuki Ignis S1600	MON; 17					GRE; Ret	TUR; 17		FIN; 20	GER	JPN	GBR; Ret	ITA; 12	FRA	ESP; 17		NC	0
2004	Mirco Baldacci	Mitsubishi Lancer Evo VI		SWE; 27	MEX	NZL; 17	CYP			ARG; Ret									NC	0
2004	Mirco Baldacci	Mitsubishi Lancer Evo VII																AUS; 10	NC	0
2005	Mirco Baldacci	Fiat Punto S1600	MON; 22	SWE	MEX	NZL	ITA; Ret	CYP		GRE; 22	ARG	FIN; 28	GER; 22	GBR	JPN	FRA; 14	ESP; 17	AUS	NC	0
2005	Mirco Baldacci	Fiat Palio S1600							TUR; 36										NC	0
2006	Mirco Baldacci	Mitsubishi Lancer Evo IX	MON	SWE	MEX; 11	ESP	FRA	ARG; 21	ITA	GRE; 20	GER	FIN	JPN; 46	CYP	TUR	AUS; 7	NZL; 18	GBR; Ret	27th	2
2007	Motoring Club	Subaru Impreza WRX STi	MON	SWE; 31	NOR	MEX; 14	POR	ARG; Ret	ITA	GRE; 17	FIN	GER	NZL; 36	ESP	FRA	JPN	IRE	GBR; 21	NC	0
2008	Mirco Baldacci	Mitsubishi Lancer Evo IX	MON	SWE	MEX	ARG; Ret	JOR	ITA	GRE; Ret	TUR; 14	FIN	GER	NZL; Ret	ESP	FRA	JPN; 15	GBR; Ret		NC	0

=== JWRC results ===
Year	Entrant	Car	1	2	3	4	5	6	7	8	JWRC	Points
2002	Mirco Baldacci	Citroën Saxo S1600	MON; Ret	ESP; Ret	GRE; Ret	GER; 4	ITA; 13	GBR; Ret			13th	3
2003	Mirco Baldacci	Fiat Punto S1600	MON; 7	TUR; Ret	GRE; Ret	FIN; Ret	ITA; 1	ESP; Ret	GBR; 2		5th	20
2004	Mirco Baldacci	Suzuki Ignis S1600	MON; 6	GRE; Ret	TUR; 6	FIN; 4	GBR; Ret	ITA; 3	ESP; 3		5th	23
2005	Mirco Baldacci	Fiat Punto S1600	MON; 10	MEX	ITA; Ret	GRE; 5	FIN; 5	GER; 7	FRA; 1	ESP; 3	7th	26

=== PWRC results ===
Year	Entrant	Car	1	2	3	4	5	6	7	8	PWRC	Points
2006	Mirco Baldacci	Mitsubishi Lancer Evo IX	MON	MEX; 3	ARG; 3	GRE; 4	JPN; 7	CYP	AUS; 2	NZL; 5	3rd	31
2007	Motoring Club	Subaru Impreza WRX STi	SWE; 10	MEX; 4	ARG; Ret	GRE; 3	NZL; 15	JPN	IRE	GBR; 6	6th	14
2008	Mirco Baldacci	Mitsubishi Lancer Evo IX	SWE	ARG; Ret	GRE; Ret	TUR; 3	FIN	NZL; Ret	JPN; 6	GBR; Ret	11th	9
