= 2006 World Rally Championship =

34th season in the FIA World Rally Championship

Champions
- World Drivers' Champion: Sébastien Loeb
- World Manufacturers' Champion: Ford

Seasons
- ← 2005 2007 →

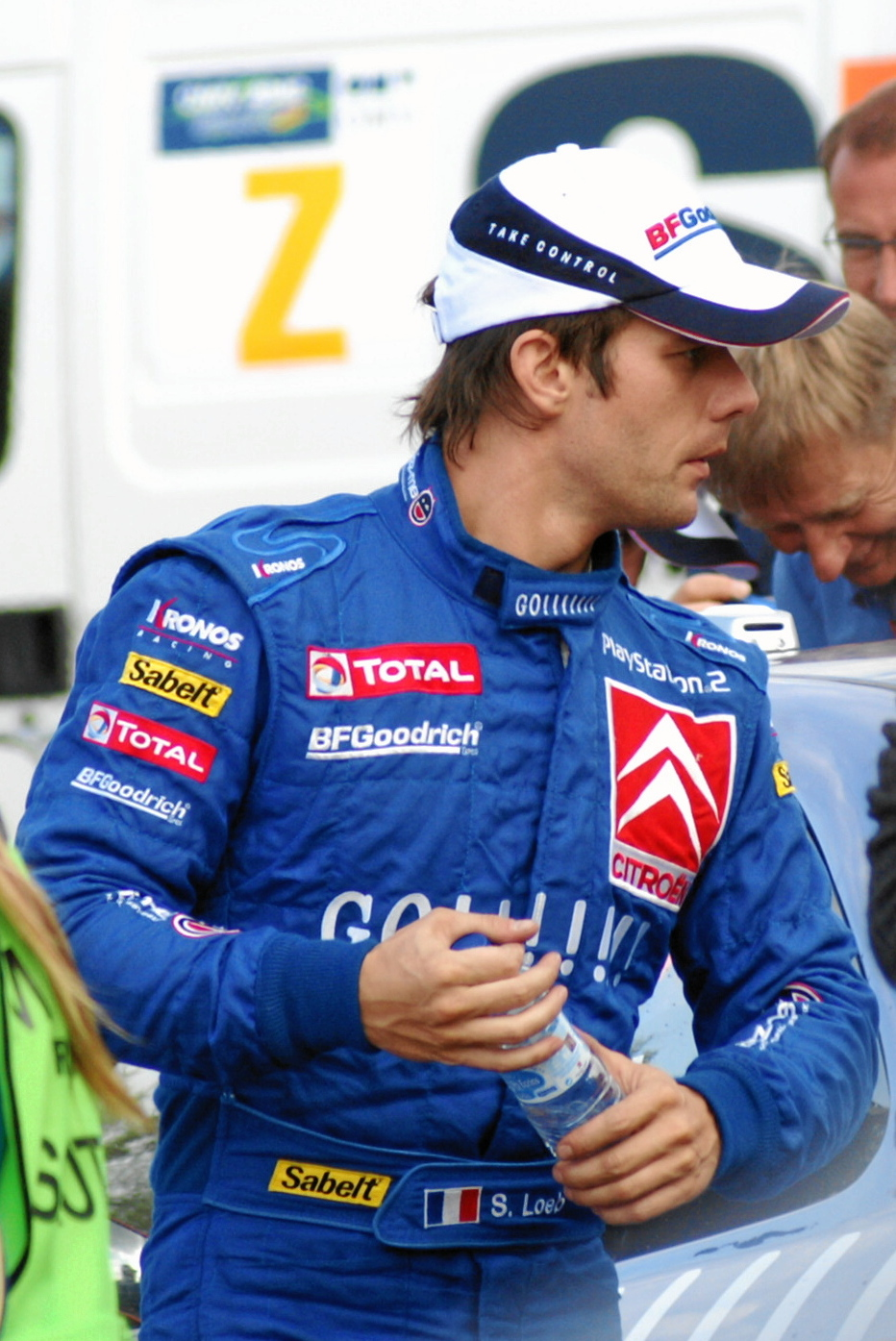
Sébastien Loeb secured his third WRC drivers' championship.

The 2006 World Rally Championship was the 34th season in the FIA World Rally Championship. The season began on January 20 with the 74th Monte Carlo Rally where Finland's Marcus Grönholm, in a Ford Focus RS WRC, took the win ahead of France's Sébastien Loeb. After the Swedish Rally ended with the same top-two, Loeb and Kronos Citroën went on to win five rallies in a row. Despite an injury in a mountain-biking accident before the Rally of Turkey, forcing Loeb to miss last four rallies, he secured his third drivers' title, whereas Ford won their first manufacturers' title since 1979.

== Rule changes ==
In an attempt to cut costs, new regulations required mechanical front and rear differentials, while the central differential remained active. Active suspension and water injections were also prohibited. Cars entered by a manufacturer had to be equipped with the same engine for two rallies; further limitations were imposed on the changing of some parts, including suspension, steering, turbochargers and gearboxes.

For 2006 manufacturer is understood to mean a manufacturer, a team designated by a manufacturer, or a privateer team taking part with a single make of car.

Two categories were created to compete for the Manufacturer's championship:

Manufacturer 1 (M1)

- undertakes to take part in all the rallies of the Championship
- must enter only cars corresponding to the latest homologated version of a World Rally Car in conformity with the 2006 Appendix J
- must inform the FIA of the name of the first driver entered for the season at the time of registration for the Championship. No change of the first driver is authorised, except in a case of force majeure. The driver of the second car may be changed for each of the rallies in the Championship
- In order to score points in the Championship, a Manufacturer 1 must take part with two cars of the same make in the 16 rallies of the calendar

Manufacturer 2 (M2)

- undertakes to take part in 10 or more Championship rallies which it has nominated
- cannot enter World Rally Cars homologated during the year 2006 and cannot use parts homologated after 2 January 2006
- cannot enter a driver who has been classified among the first six in the final classification of the FIA World Rally Championship for Drivers in the last five years
- In order to score points in the Championship, a Manufacturer 2 must take part with two cars of the same make in 10 or more rallies it nominated on registering for the Championship. The Manufacturer can only score points in the events it nominated on registering

== Calendar ==
The 2006 championship was contested over sixteen rounds in Europe, Asia, the Americas and Oceania.

| Rd. | Start date | Finish date | Rally | Rally headquarters | Surface | Stages | Distance | Support class |
|---|---|---|---|---|---|---|---|---|
| 1 | 19 January | 22 January | (Monaco) 74th Rallye Automobile Monte-Carlo | Monte Carlo | Mixed | 18 | 366.39 km | PWRC |
| 2 | 3 February | 5 February | (Sweden) 55th Uddeholm Swedish Rally | Karlstad, Värmland County | Snow | 19 | 349.02 km | JWRC |
| 3 | 3 March | 5 March | 3rd Corona Rally Mexico | León, Guanajuato | Gravel | 17 | 359.54 km | PWRC |
| 4 | 24 March | 26 March | (Spain) 42nd RallyRACC Catalunya - Costa Daurada | Salou, Catalonia | Tarmac | 16 | 346.43 km | JWRC |
| 5 | 7 April | 9 April | 50th Tour de Corse - Rallye de France | Ajaccio, Corsica | Tarmac | 12 | 354.18 km | JWRC |
| 6 | 27 April | 30 April | 26th Rally Argentina | Carlos Paz, Córdoba | Gravel | 22 | 351.44 km | JWRC/PWRC |
| 7 | 19 May | 21 May | (Italy) 3rd Rally d'Italia Sardinia | Olbia, Sardinia | Gravel | 18 | 344.90 km | JWRC |
| 8 | 2 June | 4 June | 53rd BP Ultimate Acropolis Rally of Greece | Athens | Gravel | 18 | 355.62 km | PWRC |
| 9 | 11 August | 13 August | (Germany) 25th OMV ADAC Rallye Deutschland | Trier, Rhineland-Palatinate | Tarmac | 19 | 349.11 km | JWRC |
| 10 | 18 August | 20 August | 56th Neste Rally Finland | Jyväskylä, Central Finland | Gravel | 21 | 351.61 km | JWRC |
| 11 | 1 September | 3 September | 6th Rally Japan | Obihiro, Hokkaido | Gravel | 27 | 345.72 km | PWRC |
| 12 | 22 September | 24 September | 34th Cyprus Rally | Lemesos, Limassol District | Gravel | 22 | 322.51 km | PWRC |
| 13 | 13 October | 15 October | 7th Rally of Turkey | Kemer, Antalya Province | Gravel | 19 | 337.79 km | JWRC |
| 14 | 27 October | 29 October | 19th Telstra Rally Australia | Perth, Western Australia | Gravel | 26 | 348.51 km | PWRC |
| 15 | 17 November | 19 November | 37th Propecia Rally New Zealand | Hamilton, Waikato | Gravel | 17 | 354.21 km | PWRC |
| 16 | 1 December | 3 December | (United Kingdom) 62nd Wales Rally GB | Cardiff, Wales | Gravel | 17 | 355.92 km | JWRC |

== Teams and drivers ==
World Rally Car entries eligible to score manufacturer points (Part 1)
| Manufacturer | Car | Team | Tyre | No | Drivers | Co-drivers | Rounds |
|---|---|---|---|---|---|---|---|
| Citroën | Xsara WRC | (Belgium) Kronos Total Citroën World Rally Team | BF | 1 | (France) Sébastien Loeb | (Monaco) Daniel Elena | 1–12^{†} |
| Citroën | Xsara WRC | (Belgium) Kronos Total Citroën World Rally Team | BF | 1 | (Scotland) Colin McRae | (Wales) Nicky Grist | 13 |
| Citroën | Xsara WRC | (Belgium) Kronos Total Citroën World Rally Team | BF | 1 | (Spain) Xavier Pons | (Spain) Carlos del Barrio | 14–16 |
| Citroën | Xsara WRC | (Belgium) Kronos Total Citroën World Rally Team | BF | 2 | (Spain) Xavier Pons | (Spain) Carlos del Barrio | 1–8 |
| Citroën | Xsara WRC | (Belgium) Kronos Total Citroën World Rally Team | BF | 2 | (Spain) Daniel Sordo | (Spain) Marc Martí | 9–16 |
| Ford | Focus RS WRC 06 | (United Kingdom) BP Ford World Rally Team | BF | 3 | (Finland) Marcus Grönholm | (Finland) Timo Rautiainen | All |
| Ford | Focus RS WRC 06 | (United Kingdom) BP Ford World Rally Team | BF | 4 | (Finland) Mikko Hirvonen | (Finland) Jarmo Lehtinen | All |
| Subaru | Impreza WRC2006 | (Japan) Subaru World Rally Team | P | 5 | (Norway) Petter Solberg | (Wales) Phil Mills | All |
| Subaru | Impreza WRC2006 | (Japan) Subaru World Rally Team | P | 6 | (France) Stéphane Sarrazin | (Belgium) Stéphane Prévot | 1, 4–5, 9 |
| Subaru | Impreza WRC2006 | (Japan) Subaru World Rally Team | P | 6 | (Australia) Chris Atkinson | (Australia) Glenn Macneall | 2–3, 6–8, 10–16 |
World Rally Car entries eligible to score manufacturer points (Part 2)
| Peugeot | 307 WRC | OMV Peugeot Norway World Rally Team | BF | 7 | (Austria) Manfred Stohl | (Austria) Ilka Minor | All |
| Peugeot | 307 WRC | OMV Peugeot Norway World Rally Team | BF | 8 | (Norway) Henning Solberg | (Norway) Cato Menkerud | 1–3, 6–8, 10, 12–16 |
| Ford | Focus RS WRC 04; 1-10, 12-13; Focus RS WRC 06; 11, 14-16 | (United Kingdom) Stobart VK M-Sport Ford Rally Team | BF | 9 | (United Kingdom) Matthew Wilson | (United Kingdom) Michael Orr | All |
| Ford | Focus RS WRC 04; 1-10, 12-13; Focus RS WRC 06; 11, 14-16 | (United Kingdom) Stobart VK M-Sport Ford Rally Team | BF | 10 | (Belgium) Pieter Tsjoen | (Belgium) Eddy Chevaillier | 1 |
| Ford | Focus RS WRC 04; 1-10, 12-13; Focus RS WRC 06; 11, 14-16 | (United Kingdom) Stobart VK M-Sport Ford Rally Team | BF | 10 | (Finland) Kosti Katajamäki | (Finland) Timo Alanne | 2, 7–8, 10, 13 |
| Ford | Focus RS WRC 04; 1-10, 12-13; Focus RS WRC 06; 11, 14-16 | (United Kingdom) Stobart VK M-Sport Ford Rally Team | BF | 10 | (Argentina) Luis Pérez Companc | (Argentina) Jose Maria Volta | 3, 6, 11–12, 14–15 |
| Ford | Focus RS WRC 04; 1-10, 12-13; Focus RS WRC 06; 11, 14-16 | (United Kingdom) Stobart VK M-Sport Ford Rally Team | BF | 10 | (Finland) Jari-Matti Latvala | (Finland) Miikka Anttila | 4–5, 9, 16 |
| Škoda | Fabia WRC | (Austria) Red Bull Škoda Team | BF | 11 | (France) Gilles Panizzi | (France) Herve Panizzi | 1, 4 |
| Škoda | Fabia WRC | (Austria) Red Bull Škoda Team | BF | 11 | (Austria) Andreas Aigner | (Germany) Timo Gottschalk | 2 |
| Škoda | Fabia WRC | (Austria) Red Bull Škoda Team | BF | 11 | (Finland) Harri Rovanperä | (Finland) Risto Pietilanien | 5, 7–8, 12–13, 16 |
| Škoda | Fabia WRC | (Austria) Red Bull Škoda Team | BF | 11 | (Sweden) Mattias Ekström | (Sweden) Jonas Andersson | 9 |
| Škoda | Fabia WRC | (Austria) Red Bull Škoda Team | BF | 12 | (Austria) Andreas Aigner | (Germany) Timo Gottschalk | 1, 4–5, 7 |
| Škoda | Fabia WRC | (Austria) Red Bull Škoda Team | BF | 12 | (Austria) Andreas Aigner | (Germany) Klaus Wicha | 8-9, 12–13, 16 |
| Škoda | Fabia WRC | (Austria) Red Bull Škoda Team | BF | 12 | (Sweden) Mattias Ekström | (Sweden) Stefan Bergman | 2 |

World Rally Car entries ineligible to score manufacturer points
| Manufacturer | Car | Team | Tyre | Drivers | Co-drivers | Rounds |
|---|---|---|---|---|---|---|
| Citroën | Xsara WRC | (Belgium) Kronos Racing | BF | (Spain) Daniel Sordo | (Spain) Marc Martí | 1–8 |
| Citroën | Xsara WRC | (Belgium) Kronos Racing | BF | (Spain) Xavier Pons | (Spain) Carlos del Barrio | 9–13 |
| Citroën | Xsara WRC | (France) PH Sport | BF | (Finland) Janne Tuohino | (Finland) Risto Pietiläinen | 2 |
| Citroën | Xsara WRC | (France) PH Sport | BF | (Finland) Janne Tuohino | (Finland) Mikko Markkula | 10 |
| Citroën | Xsara WRC | (Italy) Astra Racing | BF | (Finland) Toni Gardemeister | (Finland) Jakke Honkanen | 8–9, 12 |
| Ford | Focus RS WRC 04 | (United Kingdom) Stobart VK M-Sport Ford Rally Team | BF | (Argentina) Luis Pérez Companc | (Argentina) José María Volta | 2, 7 |
| Ford | Focus RS WRC 04 | (United Kingdom) Stobart VK M-Sport Ford Rally Team | BF | (Argentina) Juan Pablo Raies | (Argentina) Jorge Pérez-Companc | 12 |
| Ford | Focus RS WRC 04 | (United Kingdom) Stobart VK M-Sport Ford Rally Team | BF | (Norway) Andreas Mikkelsen | (Norway) Ola Fløene | 16 |
| Ford | Focus RS WRC 04 | (Norway) Thomas Schie | | (Norway) Thomas Schie | (Sweden) Göran Bergsten | 2, 10 |
| Ford | Focus RS WRC 04 | (United Kingdom) Steve Perez | | (United Kingdom) Steve Perez | (United Kingdom) Steve Harris | 4 |
| Ford | Focus RS WRC 04 | (Belgium) Pieter Tsjoen | | (Belgium) Pieter Tsjoen | (Belgium) Eddy Chevaillier | 9 |
| Ford | Focus RS WRC 04 | (United Kingdom) Mark Higgins | | (United Kingdom) Mark Higgins | (Republic of Ireland) Rory Kennedy | 16 |
| Ford | Focus RS WRC 04 | (Republic of Ireland) Tom Hogan Motors | BF | (Republic of Ireland) Gareth MacHale | (Republic of Ireland) Paul Nagle | 1–4, 6–7, 9, 11 |
| Ford | Focus RS WRC 03 | (Republic of Ireland) Tom Hogan Motors | BF | (Republic of Ireland) Gareth MacHale | (Republic of Ireland) Paul Nagle | 16 |
| Ford | Focus RS WRC 03 | (Republic of Ireland) Tom Hogan Motors | BF | (Republic of Ireland) Austin MacHale | (Republic of Ireland) Brian Murphy | 1 |
| Ford | Focus RS WRC 03 | (Republic of Ireland) Eamonn Boland | M | (Republic of Ireland) Eamonn Boland | (Republic of Ireland) Francis Regan | 1 |
| Ford | Focus RS WRC 02 | (Greece) Emmanuel Stefanis | | (Greece) Emmanuel Stefanis | (Greece) Konstantinos Stefanis | 8 |
| Ford | Focus RS WRC 02 | (United Kingdom) Dave Weston Jr. | | (United Kingdom) Dave Weston Jr. | (United Kingdom) Aled Davies | 16 |
| Ford | Focus RS WRC 01 | Ford Rallyesport Turkey | | (Turkey) Mehmet Besler | (Turkey) Ozden Yilmaz | 13 |
| Ford | Focus RS WRC 01 | Ford Rallyesport Turkey | | (Turkey) Adnan Sarihan | (Turkey) Bahadir Gücenmez | 13 |
| Ford | Focus RS WRC 01 | Ford Rallyesport Turkey | | (Turkey) Emre Yurdakul | (Turkey) Afsin Baydar | 13 |
| Hyundai | Accent WRC3 | (South Africa) Stephen Simpson | | (South Africa) Stephen Simpson | (United Kingdom) Patrick Walsh | 16 |
| Mitsubishi | Lancer WRC05 | (United Kingdom) MMSP LTD | P BF | (Italy) Gianluigi Galli | (Italy) Giovanni Bernacchini | 1–2 |
| Mitsubishi | Lancer WRC05 | (United Kingdom) MMSP LTD | P BF | (Sweden) Daniel Carlsson | (Sweden) Bosse Holmstrand | 2 |
| Mitsubishi | Lancer WRC05 | (United Kingdom) MMSP LTD | P BF | (Sweden) Daniel Carlsson | (Sweden) Tomas Thorszelius | 10 |
| Mitsubishi | Lancer WRC05 | (United Kingdom) MMSP LTD | P BF | (Finland) Jussi Välimäki | (Finland) Jarkko Kalliolepo | 7–8, 10 |
| Mitsubishi | Lancer WRC05 | (United Kingdom) MMSP LTD | P BF | (Finland) Juho Hänninen | (Finland) Marko Sallinen | 10 |
| Peugeot | 307 WRC | (Italy) Astra Racing | BF | (Finland) Toni Gardemeister | (Finland) Jakke Honkanen | 1, 4–5 |
| Peugeot | 307 WRC | (Switzerland) Olivier Burri | M | (Switzerland) Olivier Burri | (Switzerland) Christopher Hofmann | 1 |
| Peugeot | 307 WRC | (France) BSA | BF | (France) Alexandre Bengué | (France) Caroline Escudero | 4–5 |
| Peugeot | 307 WRC | (Italy) Gianluigi Galli | P | (Italy) Gianluigi Galli | (Italy) Giovanni Bernacchini | 5–7, 10 |
| Peugeot | 307 WRC | Equipe de France FFSA | BF | (France) Nicolas Vouilloz | (France) Jacques Boyere | 5 |
| Peugeot | 307 WRC | (Czech Republic) Štěpán Vojtěch | | (Czech Republic) Štěpán Vojtěch | (Czech Republic) Michal Ernst | 9 |
| Peugeot | 206 WRC | (Switzerland) Philippe Roux | BF | (Switzerland) Philippe Roux | (Switzerland) Eric Jordan | 1, 5 |
| Peugeot | 206 WRC | Peugeot Sport Sweden | | (Sweden) Jimmy Joge | (Sweden) Mattias Andersson | 2 |
| Peugeot | 206 WRC | (Mexico) Ricardo Triviño | | (Mexico) Ricardo Triviño | (Spain) Sergio Salom | 3 |
| Peugeot | 206 WRC | (Czech Republic) Štěpán Vojtěch | | (Czech Republic) Štěpán Vojtěch | (Czech Republic) Michal Ernst | 4 |
| Peugeot | 206 WRC | (France) José Micheli | | (France) José Micheli | (France) Marielle Maccioni | 5 |
| SEAT | Córdoba WRC Evo3 | (Spain) Jordi Zurita | | (Spain) Jordi Zurita | (Spain) Manel Muñoz | 4 |
| Škoda | Fabia WRC | (Belgium) First Motorsport Škoda | BF | (Belgium) François Duval | (France) Patrick Pivato | 1, 4–5, 7–9, 13, 16 |
| Škoda | Fabia WRC | (Czech Republic) Czech RT Škoda Kopecký | BF | (Czech Republic) Jan Kopecký | (Czech Republic) Filip Schovánek | 1–2, 4–5, 7–10, 13, 16 |
| Škoda | Fabia WRC | (Germany) Skoda Auto Deutschland | BF | (Germany) Matthias Kahle | (Germany) Peter Göbel | 9 |
| Škoda | Octavia WRC Evo3 | (Italy) Riccardo Errani | P | (Italy) Riccardo Errani | (Italy) Stefano Casadio | 1 |
| Škoda | Octavia WRC Evo3 | (Finland) Jukka Ketomäki | | (Finland) Jukka Ketomäki | (Finland) Kai Risberg | 10 |
| Subaru | Impreza WRC2006 | (Japan) Subaru World Rally Team | P | (Japan) Toshihiro Arai | (New Zealand) Tony Sircombe | 11 |
| Subaru | Impreza WRC2005 | Subaru Rally Team Australia | P | (Australia) Chris Atkinson | (Australia) Glenn Macneall | 1, 4–5, 9 |
| Subaru | Impreza WRC2005 | (Poland) Cersanit Rally Team | | (Poland) Michał Sołowow | (Poland) Maciek Baran | 2 |
| Subaru | Impreza WRC2005 | (Greece) Aris Vovos | | (Greece) Aris Vovos | (Greece) Loris Meletopoulos | 8 |
| Subaru | Impreza WRC2005 | (Turkey) Ercan Kazaz | | (Turkey) Ercan Kazaz | (Turkey) Serdar Kurbanzade | 13 |
| Subaru | Impreza WRC2005 | (Italy) Valentino Rossi | P | (Italy) Valentino Rossi | (Italy) Carlo Cassina | 15 |
| Subaru | Impreza WRC2005 | (Turkey) Red Devil Atolye Kazaz | | (Finland) Kristian Sohlberg | (Finland) Tomi Tuominen | 7 |
| Subaru | Impreza WRC2005 | (Turkey) Red Devil Atolye Kazaz | | (Finland) Kristian Sohlberg | (Finland) Risto Pietiläinen | 10 |
| Subaru | Impreza WRC2004 | (Turkey) Red Devil Atolye Kazaz | | (Finland) Kristian Sohlberg | (Finland) Kaj Lindström | 2 |
| Subaru | Impreza WRC2004 | (Sweden) Rally Team Olsbergs | | (Sweden) Thomas Rådström | (Sweden) Jörgen Skallman | 2 |
| Subaru | Impreza WRC2004 | (Norway) Anders Grøndal | | (Norway) Anders Grøndal | (Norway) Trond-Inge Østbye | 2 |
| Subaru | Impreza WRC2004 | (Netherlands) Mark van Eldik | | (Netherlands) Mark van Eldik | (Belgium) Erwin Mombaerts | 9 |
| Subaru | Impreza WRC2004 | (United Kingdom) Gareth Jones | | (United Kingdom) Gareth Jones | (Republic of Ireland) David Moynihan | 9 |
| Subaru | Impreza WRC2004 | (Norway) Adapta AS | | (Norway) Mads Østberg | (Norway) Ole Unnerud | 16 |
| Subaru | Impreza WRC2003 | (Norway) Adapta AS | | (Norway) Mads Østberg | (Norway) Ole Unnerud | 10 |
| Subaru | Impreza WRC2003 | (Norway) Adapta AS | | (Norway) Mads Østberg | (Norway) Ragnar Engen | 2 |
| Subaru | Impreza WRC2003 | (Republic of Ireland) Kevin Barrett | | (Republic of Ireland) Kevin Barrett | (Republic of Ireland) Barry Goodman | 4 |
| Toyota | Corolla WRC | (Italy) Fabio Frisiero | | (Italy) Fabio Frisiero | (Italy) Simone Scattolin | 2 |
| Toyota | Corolla WRC | (Denmark) Poulsen Motorsport | | (Denmark) Kristian Poulsen | (Denmark) Ole Fredriksen | 9 |
| Toyota | Corolla WRC | (Netherlands) Wevers Sport | | (Netherlands) Erik Wevers | (Belgium) Filip Goddé | 9 |
| Toyota | Corolla WRC | (Finland) Jari-Matti Latvala | | (Finland) Jari-Matti Latvala | (Finland) Asko Sairanen | 10 |

=== Notes ===
This is the first season without Carlos Sainz since 1986.

^{†} Sebastien Loeb broke his arm before Rally Turkey and missed the remainder of the season.

=== JWRC entries ===
| Team | Manufacturer | Car | No | Drivers | Co-drivers | Rounds |
|---|---|---|---|---|---|---|
| (France) PH Sport | Citroën | C2 S1600 | 32 | (United Kingdom) Kris Meeke | (United Kingdom) Glenn Patterson | 4–5, 9–10, 13, 16 |
| (France) PH Sport | Citroën | C2 S1600 | 42 | (France) Julien Pressac | (France) Gilles De Turckheim | 4–5, 7 |
| (France) PH Sport | Citroën | C2 S1600 | 42 | (France) Julien Pressac | (France) Jacques Boyere | 9–10, 13 |
| (France) PH Sport | Citroën | C2 S1600 | 55 | (France) Brice Tirabassi | (France) Jacques-Julien Renucci | 4, 5, 7 |
| (France) PH Sport | Citroën | C2 S1600 | 55 | (France) Brice Tirabassi | (France) Fabrice Gordon | 9 |
| (France) PH Sport | Citroën | C2 R2 | 55 | (France) Fabio Fiandino | (France) Sabrina de Castelli | 10, 13 |
| (Japan) Suzuki Sport Europe | Suzuki | Swift S1600 | 33 | (Estonia) Urmo Aava | (Estonia) Kuldar Sikk | 2, 5, 7, 10, 13, 16 |
| (Japan) Suzuki Sport Europe | Suzuki | Swift S1600 | 35 | (Sweden) Per-Gunnar Andersson | (Sweden) Jonas Andersson | 2, 6–7, 10, 13, 16 |
| (Japan) Suzuki Sport Europe | Suzuki | Swift S1600 | 37 | (Czech Republic) Pavel Valoušek | (Italy) Pierangelo Scalvini | 2, 5, 7 |
| (Japan) Suzuki Sport Europe | Suzuki | Swift S1600 | 37 | (Czech Republic) Pavel Valoušek | (Czech Republic) Zdeněk Hrůza | 9–10, 13 |
| (Japan) Suzuki Sport Europe | Suzuki | Swift S1600 | 43 | (Estonia) Jaan Mölder | (Germany) Katrin Becker | 16 |
| (Japan) Suzuki Sport Europe | Suzuki | Swift S1600 | 48 | (United Kingdom) Guy Wilks | (United Kingdom) Phil Pugh | 2, 6–7, 10, 13, 16 |
| (Italy) Autorel Sport | Renault | Clio S1600 | 36 | (Italy) Luca Betti | (Italy) Piercarlo Capolongo | 4–5, 7, 9, 13, 16 |
| (France) Barroso Sport | Renault | Clio S1600 | 39 | (Zimbabwe) Conrad Rautenbach | (United Kingdom) David Senior | 4–5, 7, 9–10, 13 |
| (France) Renault Sport | Renault | Clio S1600 | 41 | (Sweden) Patrik Sandell | (Sweden) Emil Axelsson | 2, 6–7, 10, 13, 16 |
| (France) Renault Sport | Renault | Clio S1600 | 51 | (Turkey) Fatih Kara | (Turkey) Cerm Bakancocuklari | 4–5, 7, 9, 13, 16 |
| (France) Renault Sport | Renault | Clio S1600 | 52 | (Belgium) Bernd Casier | (Belgium) Frédéric Miclotte | 4–5, 7, 9, 13, 16 |
| (United Kingdom) M-Sport | Ford | Fiesta S1600 | 43 | (Estonia) Jaan Mölder | (Germany) Katrin Becker | 2, 6 |
| (Czech Republic) JM Engineering | Suzuki | Ignis S1600 | 43 | (Estonia) Jaan Mölder | (Germany) Katrin Becker | 7, 10, 13 |
| (Poland) Suzuki Shell Helix | Suzuki | Ignis S1600 | 44 | (Poland) Michał Kościuszko | (Poland) Jaroslaw Baran | 2, 4, 7, 9–10, 13 |
| (Slovakia) Styllex Tuning Motorsport | Suzuki | Ignis S1600 | 45 | (Slovakia) Jozef Béreš | (Czech Republic) Petr Starý | 2, 4–5, 10, 13, 16 |
| (Italy) Power Car Team | Renault | Clio RS | 46 | (Italy) Andrea Cortinovis | (Italy) Massimiliano Bosi | 2, 4, 7, 10, 16 |
| (Italy) Power Car Team | Renault | Clio RS | 46 | (Italy) Andrea Cortinovis | (Italy) Flavio Zanella | 13 |
| (Italy) Hawk Racing Club | Opel | Astra OPC | 47 | (Italy) Filippo Bordignon | (Italy) James Bardini | 2, 10, 13 |
| (Italy) Hawk Racing Club | Opel | Astra OPC | 47 | (Italy) Filippo Bordignon | (Italy) Justin Bardini | 4, 7, 16 |
| (Czech Republic) Jipocar Czech National Team | Citroën | S1600 | 49 | (Czech Republic) Martin Prokop | (Czech Republic) Jan Tománek | 2, 4, 7, 9–10, 13 |
| (Finland) Clio Junior Team | Renault | Clio S1600 | 50 | (Finland) Kalle Pinomäki | (Finland) Mikko Markkula | 10 |
| (Finland) Clio Junior Team | Renault | Clio RS | 50 | (Finland) Kalle Pinomäki | (Finland) Mikko Markkula | 2, 4–5, 9 |
| (Finland) Clio Junior Team | Renault | Clio RS | 50 | (Estonia) Egon Kaur | (Estonia) Avo Kristov | 16 |
| (United Kingdom) Stobart VK M-Sport Ford Rally Team | Ford | Fiesta ST | 53 | (United Kingdom) Barry Clark | (United Kingdom) Scott Martin | 4–5, 7, 9–10, 16 |
| (Austria) OMV Rally Team | Citroën | C2 S1600 | 54 | (Germany) Aaron Burkart | (Germany) Jörg Bastuck | 4 |
| (Austria) OMV Rally Team | Citroën | C2 S1600 | 54 | (Germany) Aaron Burkart | (Germany) Tanja Geilhausen | 5, 7, 9, 13, 16 |
Additional guest entries
| Suzuki Sweden | Suzuki | Ignis S1600 | 59 | (Sweden) Peter Zachrisson | (Sweden) Jan Svanström | 2 |
| (Sweden) Johan Karlsson Motorsport | Peugeot | 206 RC | 60 | (Sweden) Johan Karlsson | (Sweden) Mattias Gustavsson | 2 |
| Equipe de France FFSA | Renault | Clio S1600 | 59 | (France) Yoann Bonato | (France) Benjamin Boulloud | 5 |
| (Finland) Motor Stars | Honda | Civic Type-R | 59 | (Finland) Matti Rantanen | (Finland) Jan Lönegren | 10 |
| (United Kingdom) Dealer Team Suzuki | Suzuki | Ignis S1600 | 59 | (United Kingdom) James Wozencroft | (United Kingdom) Robert Fagg | 16 |
| (United Kingdom) Tom Walster Rally Sport | Ford | Fiesta ST | 60 | (United Kingdom) Tom Walster | (United Kingdom) Paul Williams | 16 |

=== PWRC entries ===
| Team | Manufacturer | Car | No | Drivers | Co-drivers | Rounds |
|---|---|---|---|---|---|---|
| (Japan) Subaru Team Arai | Subaru | Impreza WRX STI | 31 | (Japan) Toshihiro Arai | (New Zealand) Tony Sircombe | 3, 6, 8, 12, 14–15 |
| (Argentina) Tango Rally Team | Mitsubishi | Lancer Evo IX | 32 | (Argentina) Marcos Ligato | (Argentina) Rubén García | 3, 6, 8, 11, 14–15 |
| (Argentina) Tango Rally Team | Mitsubishi | Lancer Evo IX | 34 | (Argentina) Sebastián Beltran | (Chile) Ricardo Rojas | 3, 6, 8, 11, 14–15 |
| (Argentina) Tango Rally Team | Mitsubishi | Lancer Evo IX | 35 | (Argentina) Gabriel Pozzo | (Argentina) Daniel Stillo | 3, 6, 8, 11, 14–15 |
| (Japan) Advan-Piaa Rally Team | Mitsubishi | Lancer Evo IX | 33 | (Japan) Fumio Nutahara | (United Kingdom) Daniel Barritt | 1, 3, 11–12, 14–15 |
| (France) Mitsubishi Paris West Team | Mitsubishi | Lancer Evo IX | 36 | (San Marino) Mirco Baldacci | (Italy) Giovanni Agnese | 3, 6, 8, 11, 14–15 |
| (Italy) Motoring Club | Subaru | Impreza WRX STI | 37 | (Finland) Jari-Matti Latvala | (Finland) Miikka Anttila | 1, 3, 8, 11, 14–15 |
| (Japan) Syms Rally Team | Subaru | Impreza WRX STI | 38 | (Poland) Leszek Kuzaj | (Poland) Maciek Szczepaniak | 3, 6, 8, 11, 14–15 |
| (Japan) Syms Rally Team | Subaru | Impreza WRX STI | 45 | (Finland) Aki Teiskonen | (Finland) Miika Teiskonen | 6, 8, 11–12, 14–15 |
| (Qatar) QMMF | Subaru | Impreza WRX STI | 39 | (Qatar) Nasser Al-Attiyah | (United Kingdom) Chris Patterson | 1, 3, 6, 8, 12, 15 |
| (Italy) Errani Team Group | Mitsubishi | Lancer Evo VII | 40 | (Italy) Stefano Marrini | (Italy) Tiziana Sandroni | 1, 6, 11 |
| (Italy) Errani Team Group | Mitsubishi | Lancer Evo IX | 40 | (Italy) Stefano Marrini | (Italy) Tiziana Sandroni | 8, 14 |
| (Italy) Errani Team Group | Mitsubishi | Lancer Evo VIII | 40 | (Italy) Simone Campedelli | (Italy) Danilo Fappani | 12 |
| (Japan) Subaru Team Quasys | Subaru | Impreza WRX STI | 41 | (Japan) Takuma Kamada | (Japan) Hakaru Ichino | 6, 8 |
| (Japan) Subaru Team Quasys | Subaru | Impreza WRX STI | 41 | (Japan) Takuma Kamada | (France) Denis Giraudet | 11, 15 |
| (Japan) Subaru Team Quasys | Subaru | Impreza WRX STI | 41 | (United Arab Emirates) Khalid Al Qassimi | (United Kingdom) Nicky Beech | 12 |
| (Japan) Subaru Team Quasys | Subaru | Impreza WRX STI | 41 | (Australia) Dean Herridge | (Australia) Bill Hayes | 14 |
| Subaru Rally Team Russia | Subaru | Impreza WRX STI | 42 | (Russia) Sergey Uspenskiy | (Russia) Dmitry Eremeev | 3, 6, 8, 14 |
| Subaru Rally Team Russia | Subaru | Impreza WRX STI | 42 | (Russia) Alexander Dorosinskiy | (Russia) Dmitry Eremeev | 15 |
| Subaru Rally Team Russia | Subaru | Impreza WRX STI | 42 | (San Marino) Loris Baldacci | (Italy) Dario D'Esposito | 11 |
| (Austria) OMV CEE World Rally Team | Mitsubishi | Lancer Evo IX | 43 | (Slovenia) Andrej Jereb | (Slovenia) Miran Kacin | 8 |
| (Austria) OMV CEE World Rally Team | Mitsubishi | Lancer Evo IX | 43 | (Bulgaria) Jasen Popov | (Bulgaria) Dilian Popov | 14 |
| (Austria) OMV CEE World Rally Team | Mitsubishi | Lancer Evo VIII | 43 | (Bulgaria) Jasen Popov | (Bulgaria) Dilian Popov | 1 |
| (Austria) OMV CEE World Rally Team | Mitsubishi | Lancer Evo VIII | 43 | (Czech Republic) Štěpán Vojtěch | (Czech Republic) Michal Ernst | 3 |
| (Austria) OMV CEE World Rally Team | Mitsubishi | Lancer Evo VIII | 43 | (Germany) Aaron Burkart | (Germany) Tanja Geilhausen | 12 |
| (Austria) OMV CEE World Rally Team | Mitsubishi | Lancer Evo VIII | 43 | (United Kingdom) Natalie Barratt | (Australia) Dale Moscatt | 15 |
| (United Kingdom) Mellors Eliot Motorsport | Mitsubishi | Lancer Evo VII | 44 | (United Kingdom) David Higgins | (United Kingdom) Ross Butler | 1 |
| (United Kingdom) Mellors Eliot Motorsport | Mitsubishi | Lancer Evo VII | 44 | (United Kingdom) David Higgins | (United Kingdom) Ieuan Thomas | 8 |
| (United Kingdom) PSM Motorsport | Subaru | Impreza WRX STI | 46 | (United Kingdom) Nigel Heath | (United Kingdom) Steve Lancaster | 6, 8, 11–12, 14 |
| (United Kingdom) PSM Motorsport | Mitsubishi | Lancer Evo IX | 46 | (United Kingdom) Nigel Heath | (United Kingdom) Steve Lancaster | 15 |
Additional guest entries
| (United States) Subaru Rally Team USA | Subaru | Impreza WRX STI | 59 | (United States) Travis Pastrana | (United States) Christian Edstrom | 3 |
| (Mexico) Francisco Name | Mitsubishi | Lancer Evo VII | 60 | (Mexico) Francisco Name | (Mexico) Armando Zapata | 3 |
| (Greece) ALALamias Team | Mitsubishi | Lancer Evo VIII | 59 | (Greece) Panayiotis Hatzitsopanis | (Greece) Nikolaos Petropoulos | 8 |
| (Greece) Eko Racing Team | Mitsubishi | Lancer Evo VII | 60 | (Greece) Dimitris Nassoulas | (Greece) Mihalis Patrikoussis | 8 |
| (Cyprus) Andreas Tsouloftas | Mitsubishi | Lancer Evo IX | 59 | (Cyprus) Andreas Tsouloftas | (Cyprus) Savvas Laos | 12 |
| (Cyprus) Spyros Pavlides | Subaru | Impreza WRX STI | 60 | (Cyprus) Spyros Pavlides | (Cyprus) Theodoros Vassiliades | 12 |
| (New Zealand) Richard Mason Motorsport | Subaru | Impreza WRX STI | 59 | (New Zealand) Richard Mason | (New Zealand) Sara Mason | 15 |
| (New Zealand) Winger Subaru/Subaru NZ | Subaru | Impreza WRX STI | 60 | (New Zealand) Chris West | (New Zealand) Garry Cowan | 15 |

== Results and standings ==
=== Rally results ===
The highest finishing competitor entered in each WRC class is listed below. Non-championship entries may have finished ahead of WRC competitors in individual rounds.

| Rd. | Rally | Overall winners | PWRC Winners | JWRC winners | Report |
|---|---|---|---|---|---|
| 1 | (Monaco) Monte Carlo | (United Kingdom) No. 3 BP Ford World Rally Team | (Japan) No. 33 Advan-Piaa Rally Team | N/A | Report |
| 1 | (Monaco) Monte Carlo | (United States) Ford Focus RS WRC '06 | (Japan) Mitsubishi Lancer Evo IX | N/A | Report |
| 1 | (Monaco) Monte Carlo | (Finland) Marcus Grönholm (Finland) Timo Rautiainen | (Japan) Fumio Nutahara (United Kingdom) Daniel Barritt | N/A | Report |
| 2 | Sweden | (United Kingdom) No. 3 BP Ford World Rally Team | N/A | (Japan) No. 35 Suzuki Sport | Report |
| 2 | Sweden | (United States) Ford Focus RS WRC '06 | N/A | (Japan) Suzuki Swift S1600 | Report |
| 2 | Sweden | (Finland) Marcus Grönholm (Finland) Timo Rautiainen | N/A | (Sweden) Per-Gunnar Andersson (Sweden) Jonas Andersson | Report |
| 3 | Mexico | (Belgium) No. 1 Kronos Racing | (Japan) No. 31 Subaru Team Arai | N/A | Report |
| 3 | Mexico | (France) Citroën Xsara WRC | (Japan) Subaru Impreza STi N12 | N/A | Report |
| 3 | Mexico | (France) Sébastien Loeb (Monaco) Daniel Elena | (Japan) Toshihiro Arai (New Zealand) Tony Sircombe | N/A | Report |
| 4 | Spain | (Belgium) No. 1 Kronos Racing | N/A | (Czech Republic) No. 49 Jipocar Czech National Team | Report |
| 4 | Spain | (France) Citroën Xsara WRC | N/A | (France) Citroën C2 S1600 | Report |
| 4 | Spain | (France) Sébastien Loeb (Monaco) Daniel Elena | N/A | (Czech Republic) Martin Prokop (Czech Republic) Jan Tománek | Report |
| 5 | France | (Belgium) No. 1 Kronos Racing | N/A | (France) No. 41 PH Sport | Report |
| 5 | France | (France) Citroën Xsara WRC | N/A | (France) Citroën C2 S1600 | Report |
| 5 | France | (France) Sébastien Loeb (Monaco) Daniel Elena | N/A | (France) Brice Tirabassi (France) Jacques-Julien Renucci | Report |
| 6 | Argentina | (Belgium) No. 1 Kronos Racing | (United Kingdom) No. 39 QMMF | (Japan) No. 148 Suzuki Sport | Report |
| 6 | Argentina | (France) Citroën Xsara WRC | (Japan) Subaru Impreza STi N12 | (Japan) Suzuki Swift S1600 | Report |
| 6 | Argentina | (France) Sébastien Loeb (Monaco) Daniel Elena | (Qatar) Nasser Al-Attiyah (United Kingdom) Chris Patterson | (United Kingdom) Guy Wilks (United Kingdom) Phil Pugh | Report |
| 7 | Italy | (Belgium) No. 1 Kronos Racing | N/A | (France) No. 41 Renault Sport | Report |
| 7 | Italy | (France) Citroën Xsara WRC | N/A | (France) Renault Clio S1600 | Report |
| 7 | Italy | (France) Sébastien Loeb (Monaco) Daniel Elena | N/A | (Sweden) Patrik Sandell (Sweden) Emil Axelsson | Report |
| 8 | Greece | (United Kingdom) No. 3 BP Ford World Rally Team | (United Kingdom) No. 39 QMMF | N/A | Report |
| 8 | Greece | (United States) Ford Focus RS WRC '06 | (Japan) Subaru Impreza STi N12 | N/A | Report |
| 8 | Greece | (Finland) Marcus Grönholm (Finland) Timo Rautiainen | (Qatar) Nasser Al-Attiyah (United Kingdom) Chris Patterson | N/A | Report |
| 9 | Germany | (Belgium) No. 1 Kronos Racing | N/A | (France) No. 32 PH Sport | Report |
| 9 | Germany | (France) Citroën Xsara WRC | N/A | (France) Citroën C2 S1600 | Report |
| 9 | Germany | (France) Sébastien Loeb (Monaco) Daniel Elena | N/A | (United Kingdom) Kris Meeke (United Kingdom) Glenn Patterson | Report |
| 10 | Finland | (United Kingdom) No. 3 BP Ford World Rally Team | N/A | (Japan) No. 48 Suzuki Sport | Report |
| 10 | Finland | (United States) Ford Focus RS WRC '06 | N/A | (Japan) Suzuki Swift S1600 | Report |
| 10 | Finland | (Finland) Marcus Grönholm (Finland) Timo Rautiainen | N/A | (United Kingdom) Guy Wilks (United Kingdom) Phil Pugh | Report |
| 11 | Japan | (Belgium) No. 1 Kronos Racing | (Japan) No. 33 Advan-Piaa Rally Team | N/A | Report |
| 11 | Japan | (France) Citroën Xsara WRC | (Japan) Mitsubishi Lancer Evo IX | N/A | Report |
| 11 | Japan | (France) Sébastien Loeb (Monaco) Daniel Elena | (Japan) Fumio Nutahara (United Kingdom) Daniel Barritt | N/A | Report |
| 12 | Cyprus | (Belgium) No. 1 Kronos Racing | (Japan) No. 33 Advan-Piaa Rally Team | N/A | Report |
| 12 | Cyprus | (France) Citroën Xsara WRC | (Japan) Mitsubishi Lancer Evo IX | N/A | Report |
| 12 | Cyprus | (France) Sébastien Loeb (Monaco) Daniel Elena | (Japan) Fumio Nutahara (United Kingdom) Daniel Barritt | N/A | Report |
| 13 | Turkey | (United Kingdom) No. 3 BP Ford World Rally Team | N/A | (Japan) No. 33 Suzuki Sport | Report |
| 13 | Turkey | (United States) Ford Focus RS WRC '06 | N/A | (Japan) Suzuki Swift S1600 | Report |
| 13 | Turkey | (Finland) Marcus Grönholm (Finland) Timo Rautiainen | N/A | (Estonia) Urmo Aava (Estonia) Kuldar Sikk | Report |
| 14 | Australia | (United Kingdom) No. 4 BP Ford World Rally Team | (Italy) No. 37 Motoring Club | N/A | Report |
| 14 | Australia | (United States) Ford Focus RS WRC '06 | (Japan) Subaru Impreza STi N12 | N/A | Report |
| 14 | Australia | (Finland) Mikko Hirvonen (Finland) Jarmo Lehtinen | (Finland) Jari-Matti Latvala (Finland) Miikka Anttila | N/A | Report |
| 15 | New Zealand | (United Kingdom) No. 3 BP Ford World Rally Team | (Italy) No. 37 Motoring Club | N/A | Report |
| 15 | New Zealand | (United States) Ford Focus RS WRC '06 | (Japan) Subaru Impreza STi N12 | N/A | Report |
| 15 | New Zealand | (Finland) Marcus Grönholm (Finland) Timo Rautiainen | (Finland) Jari-Matti Latvala (Finland) Miikka Anttila | N/A | Report |
| 16 | (United Kingdom) Britain | (United Kingdom) No. 3 BP Ford World Rally Team | N/A | (Japan) No. 43 Suzuki Sport | Report |
| 16 | (United Kingdom) Britain | (United States) Ford Focus RS WRC '06 | N/A | (Japan) Suzuki Swift S1600 | Report |
| 16 | (United Kingdom) Britain | (Finland) Marcus Grönholm (Finland) Timo Rautiainen | N/A | (Estonia) Jaan Mölder jr. (Germany) Katrin Becker | Report |

=== Drivers' championship ===
| Pos. | Driver | MON (Monaco) | SWE (Sweden) | MEX (Mexico) | ESP (Spain) | FRA (France) | ARG (Argentina) | ITA (Italy) | GRC (Greece) | GER (Germany) | FIN (Finland) | JPN (Japan) | CYP (Cyprus) | TUR (Turkey) | AUS (Australia) | NZL (New Zealand) | GBR (United Kingdom) | Pts |
|---|---|---|---|---|---|---|---|---|---|---|---|---|---|---|---|---|---|---|
| 1 | (France) Sébastien Loeb | 2 | 2 | 1 | 1 | 1 | 1 | 1 | 2 | 1 | 2 | 1 | 1 | | | | | 112 |
| 2 | (Finland) Marcus Grönholm | 1 | 1 | 8 | 3 | 2 | 10 | Ret | 1 | 3 | 1 | 2 | 2 | 1 | 5 | 1 | 1 | 111 |
| 3 | (Finland) Mikko Hirvonen | 7 | 12 | 14 | 9 | 4 | Ret | 2 | 3 | 9 | 3 | 3 | 3 | 2 | 1 | 2 | Ret | 65 |
| 4 | (Austria) Manfred Stohl | 4 | 18 | 3 | 12 | 7 | 4 | 7 | Ret | 5 | 9 | 5 | 4 | 8 | 3 | 3 | 2 | 54 |
| 5 | (Spain) Daniel Sordo | 8 | 16 | 4 | 2 | 3 | 5 | 3 | 6 | 2 | Ret | DSQ | Ret | 7 | 23 | 5 | 7 | 49 |
| 6 | (Norway) Petter Solberg | Ret | DSQ | 2 | 7 | 11 | 2 | 9 | 7 | Ret | Ret | 7 | 8 | 13 | 2 | 6 | 3 | 40 |
| 7 | (Spain) Xavier Pons | 9 | 7 | Ret | Ret | 6 | 17 | 4 | 8 | 14 | Ret | DNS | 7 | 4 | 4 | 4 | 5 | 32 |
| 8 | (Norway) Henning Solberg | Ret | 8 | 5 | | | 7 | Ret | 5 | | 4 | | 6 | 3 | Ret | 12 | 11 | 25 |
| 9 | (Finland) Toni Gardemeister | 3 | | | | DNS | DNS | | 4 | 4 | | | 5 | | | | | 20 |
| 10 | (Australia) Chris Atkinson | 6 | 11 | 7 | 11 | 13 | 6 | 10 | 11 | 8 | 13 | 4 | 9 | 6 | 9 | Ret | 6 | 20 |
| 11 | (Italy) Gianluigi Galli | Ret | 4 | | | 9 | 3 | Ret | | | 5 | | | | | | | 15 |
| 12 | (France) Alexandre Bengué | | | | 4 | 5 | | | | | | | | | | | | 9 |
| 13 | (Finland) Jari-Matti Latvala | 41 | | 25 | 16 | Ret | | | 22 | 34 | 17 | 69 | | | 6 | 8 | 4 | 9 |
| 14 | (Finland) Kosti Katajamäki | | 6 | | | | | Ret | 26 | | 14 | | | 5 | | | | 7 |
| 15 | (Czech Republic) Jan Kopecký | 11 | 13 | | 5 | 10 | | 17 | 16 | 7 | 8 | | | Ret | | | 10 | 7 |
| 16 | (Sweden) Daniel Carlsson | | 3 | | | | | | | | Ret | | | | | | | 6 |
| 17 | (Finland) Jussi Välimäki | | | | | | | 5 | 9 | | 7 | | | | | | | 6 |
| 18 | (France) Stéphane Sarrazin | 5 | | | 8 | 8 | | | | Ret | | | | | | | | 6 |
| 19 | (Belgium) François Duval | Ret | | | 6 | Ret | | 8 | 13 | Ret | | | | 9 | | | 8 | 5 |
| 20 | (Sweden) Thomas Rådström | | 5 | | | | | | | | | | | | | | | 4 |
| 21 | (Republic of Ireland) Gareth MacHale | 16 | | 6 | Ret | | 11 | 11 | | 10 | | Ret | | | | | Ret | 3 |
| 22 | (Finland) Kristian Sohlberg | | Ret | | | | | 6 | | | Ret | | | | | | | 3 |
| 23 | (Austria) Andreas Aigner | 13 | Ret | | 13 | 15 | | 13 | 14 | 6 | | | Ret | 10 | | | Ret | 3 |
| 24 | (Finland) Janne Tuohino | | 10 | | | | | | | | 6 | | | | | | | 3 |
| 25 | (Japan) Toshihiro Arai | | | 9 | | | 30 | | 21 | | | 6 | 22 | | Ret | 30 | | 3 |
| 26 | (San Marino) Mirco Baldacci | | | 11 | | | 21 | | 20 | | | 46 | | | 7 | 18 | Ret | 2 |
| 27 | (Argentina) Luís Pérez Companc | | 23 | 12 | | | 9 | 12 | | | | 11 | 14 | | 22 | 7 | | 2 |
| 28 | (United Kingdom) Matthew Wilson | 15 | 14 | 16 | 15 | 16 | 8 | 34 | 10 | 12 | 10 | 40 | 10 | 12 | 27 | 13 | 12 | 1 |
| 29 | (Japan) Fumio Nutahara | 17 | | Ret | | | | | | | | 8 | 11 | | 26 | 21 | | 1 |
| 30 | (Australia) Dean Herridge | | | | | | | | | | | 14 | | | 8 | | | 1 |
| Pos. | Driver | MON (Monaco) | SWE (Sweden) | MEX (Mexico) | ESP (Spain) | FRA (France) | ARG (Argentina) | ITA (Italy) | GRC (Greece) | GER (Germany) | FIN (Finland) | JPN (Japan) | CYP (Cyprus) | TUR (Turkey) | AUS (Australia) | NZL (New Zealand) | GBR (United Kingdom) | Pts |

Key
| Colour | Result |
|---|---|
| Gold | Winner |
| Silver | 2nd place |
| Bronze | 3rd place |
| Green | Points finish |
| Blue | Non-points finish |
| Blue | Non-classified finish (NC) |
| Purple | Did not finish (Ret) |
| Black | Excluded (EX) |
| Black | Disqualified (DSQ) |
| White | Did not start (DNS) |
| White | Cancelled (C) |
| Blank | Withdrew entry from the event (WD) |

- Sébastien Loeb secured the drivers' championship title in Australia.

=== Manufacturers' championship ===
| Pos. | Manufacturer | No. | MON (Monaco) | SWE (Sweden) | MEX (Mexico) | ESP (Spain) | FRA (France) | ARG (Argentina) | ITA (Italy) | GRE (Greece) | GER (Germany) | FIN (Finland) | JPN (Japan) | CYP (Cyprus) | TUR (Turkey) | AUS (Australia) | NZL (New Zealand) | GBR (United Kingdom) | Points |
|---|---|---|---|---|---|---|---|---|---|---|---|---|---|---|---|---|---|---|---|
| 1 | (United Kingdom) BP Ford World Rally Team | 3 | 1 | 1 | 8 | 2 | 2 | 8 | Ret | 1 | 3 | 1 | 2 | 2 | 1 | 5 | 1 | 1 | 195 |
| 1 | (United Kingdom) BP Ford World Rally Team | 4 | 5 | 7 | 6 | 5 | 3 | Ret | 2 | 3 | 5 | 3 | 3 | 3 | 2 | 1 | 2 | Ret | 195 |
| 2 | (Belgium) Kronos Total Citroën World Rally Team | 1 | 2 | 2 | 1 | 1 | 1 | 1 | 1 | 2 | 1 | 2 | 1 | 1 | Ret | 4 | 4 | 5 | 166 |
| 2 | (Belgium) Kronos Total Citroën World Rally Team | 2 | 6 | 4 | Ret | Ret | 4 | 9 | 3 | 6 | 2 | Ret | Ret | Ret | 6 | 8 | 5 | 7 | 166 |
| 3 | (Japan) Subaru World Rally Team | 5 | Ret | Ret | 2 | 3 | 6 | 2 | 5 | 5 | Ret | Ret | 5 | 6 | 11 | 2 | 6 | 3 | 106 |
| 3 | (Japan) Subaru World Rally Team | 6 | 4 | 6 | 5 | 4 | 5 | 4 | 6 | 8 | Ret | 7 | 4 | 7 | 5 | 6 | Ret | 6 | 106 |
| 4 | OMV Peugeot Norway | 7 | 3 | 9 | 3 | | | 3 | 4 | Ret | | 5 | | 4 | 7 | 3 | 3 | 2 | 88 |
| 4 | OMV Peugeot Norway | 8 | Ret | 5 | 4 | | | 5 | Ret | 4 | | 4 | | 5 | 3 | Ret | 8 | 9 | 88 |
| 5 | (United Kingdom) Stobart VK M-Sport Ford Rally Team | 9 | 10 | 8 | 9 | 8 | 9 | 6 | 9 | 7 | 7 | 6 | 7 | 8 | 10 | 9 | 9 | 10 | 44 |
| 5 | (United Kingdom) Stobart VK M-Sport Ford Rally Team | 10 | 9 | 3 | 7 | 9 | Ret | 7 | Ret | 11 | 8 | 8 | 6 | 9 | 4 | 7 | 7 | 4 | 44 |
| 6 | (Austria) Red Bull Škoda Team | 11 | 7 | Ret | | 6 | 7 | | 8 | 9 | 6 | | | Ret | 9 | | | 8 | 24 |
| 6 | (Austria) Red Bull Škoda Team | 12 | 8 | Ret | | 7 | 8 | | 7 | 10 | 4 | | | Ret | 8 | | | Ret | 24 |
| Pos. | Manufacturer | No. | MON (Monaco) | SWE (Sweden) | MEX (Mexico) | ESP (Spain) | FRA (France) | ARG (Argentina) | ITA (Italy) | GRE (Greece) | GER (Germany) | FIN (Finland) | JPN (Japan) | CYP (Cyprus) | TUR (Turkey) | AUS (Australia) | NZL (New Zealand) | GBR (United Kingdom) | Points |

Key
| Colour | Result |
|---|---|
| Gold | Winner |
| Silver | 2nd place |
| Bronze | 3rd place |
| Green | Points finish |
| Blue | Non-points finish |
| Blue | Non-classified finish (NC) |
| Purple | Did not finish (Ret) |
| Black | Excluded (EX) |
| Black | Disqualified (DSQ) |
| White | Did not start (DNS) |
| White | Cancelled (C) |
| Blank | Withdrew entry from the event (WD) |

- Ford secured the manufacturers' championship in New Zealand.

=== JWRC Drivers' championship ===
| Pos. | Driver | SWE (Sweden) | ESP (Spain) | FRA (France) | ARG (Argentina) | ITA (Italy) | GER (Germany) | FIN (Finland) | TUR (Turkey) | GBR (United Kingdom) | Pts |
|---|---|---|---|---|---|---|---|---|---|---|---|
| 1 | (Sweden) Patrik Sandell | 2 | | | 2 | 1 | | 7 | 11 | 5 | 32 |
| 2 | (Estonia) Urmo Aava | 3 | | 2 | | 3 | | Ret | 1 | 8 | 31 |
| 3 | (Sweden) Per-Gunnar Andersson | 1 | | | 3 | 4 | | 2 | Ret | Ret | 29 |
| 4 | (United Kingdom) Guy Wilks | 9 | | | 1 | 8 | | 1 | 4 | 11 | 26 |
| 5 | (Zimbabwe) Conrad Rautenbach | | 6 | 3 | | 2 | 9 | 11 | 2 | | 25 |
| 6 | (Slovakia) Jozef Béreš jun. | 6 | 4 | 5 | | | | 5 | 3 | 10 | 22 |
| 7 | (United Kingdom) Kris Meeke | | 3 | Ret | | | 1 | Ret | 5 | Ret | 20 |
| 8 | (France) Julien Pressac | | Ret | 4 | | 7 | 5 | 5 | 7 | | 19 |
| 9 | (Estonia) Jaan Mölder jr. | 10 | | | 4 | 12 | | 6 | Ret | 1 | 18 |
| 10 | (Czech Republic) Martin Prokop | 11 | 1 | | | 11 | 5 | 8 | 6 | | 18 |
| 11 | (Belgium) Bernd Casier | | 2 | 10 | | Ret | 2 | | 8 | Ret | 17 |
| 12 | (Germany) Aaron Burkart | | Ret | 7 | | 5 | 6 | | 12 | 3 | 15 |
| 13 | (Italy) Luca Betti | | Ret | Ret | | 6 | 8 | | | 2 | 12 |
| 14 | (France) Brice Tirabassi | | 8 | 1 | | 9 | Ret | | | | 11 |
| 15 | (Czech Republic) Pavel Valoušek jun. | 4 | | Ret | | 14 | 3 | 12 | 13 | | 11 |
| 16 | (Turkey) Fatih Kara | | 7 | 6 | | Ret | 7 | | 9 | Ret | 7 |
| 17 | (Finland) Matti Rantanen | | | | | | | 3 | | | 6 |
| 18 | (United Kingdom) Barry Clark | | Ret | 9 | | 15 | 10 | 9 | | 4 | 5 |
| 19 | (Poland) Michał Kościuszko | 8 | 5 | | | 10 | 11 | Ret | 10 | | 5 |
| 20 | (Finland) Kalle Pinomäki | 5 | 10 | 11 | | | Ret | 13 | | | 4 |
| 21 | (United Kingdom) James Wozencroft | | | | | | | | | 6 | 3 |
| 22 | (Sweden) Peter Zachrisson | 7 | | | | | | | | | 2 |
| 22 | (Italy) Andrea Cortinovis | 14 | | 12 | | 13 | | 10 | 15 | 7 | 2 |
| 22 | (France) Yoann Bonato | | | 8 | | | | | | | 1 |
| Pos. | Driver | SWE (Sweden) | ESP (Spain) | FRA (France) | ARG (Argentina) | ITA (Italy) | GER (Germany) | FIN (Finland) | TUR (Turkey) | GBR (United Kingdom) | Pts |

Key
| Colour | Result |
|---|---|
| Gold | Winner |
| Silver | 2nd place |
| Bronze | 3rd place |
| Green | Points finish |
| Blue | Non-points finish |
| Blue | Non-classified finish (NC) |
| Purple | Did not finish (Ret) |
| Black | Excluded (EX) |
| Black | Disqualified (DSQ) |
| White | Did not start (DNS) |
| White | Cancelled (C) |
| Blank | Withdrew entry from the event (WD) |

=== PWRC Drivers' championship ===
| Pos. | Driver | MON (Monaco) | MEX (Mexico) | ARG (Argentina) | GRC (Greece) | JPN (Japan) | CYP (Cyprus) | AUS (Australia) | NZL (New Zealand) | Pts |
|---|---|---|---|---|---|---|---|---|---|---|
| 1 | (Qatar) Nasser Al-Attiyah | 3 | 2 | 1 | 1 | | 5 | | 7 | 40 |
| 2 | (Japan) Fumio Nutahara | 1 | Ret | | | 1 | 1 | 7 | 6 | 35 |
| 3 | (San Marino) Mirco Baldacci | | 3 | 3 | 4 | 7 | | 2 | 5 | 31 |
| 4 | (Finland) Jari-Matti Latvala | 5 | 9 | | 6 | 9 | | 1 | 1 | 27 |
| 5 | (Finland) Aki Teiskonen | | | Ret | 3 | 4 | 2 | 4 | Ret | 24 |
| 6 | (Japan) Toshihiro Arai | | 1 | 8 | 5 | | 6 | Ret | 9 | 18 |
| 7 | (Poland) Leszek Kuzaj | | 4 | 2 | Ret | 5 | | | Ret | 17 |
| 8 | (Italy) Stefano Marrini | 4 | | 7 | 8 | 6 | | 6 | | 14 |
| 9 | (New Zealand) Richard Mason | | | | | | | | 2 | 8 |
| 10 | (Russia) Sergey Uspenskiy | | 5 | 9 | 9 | | | 5 | | 8 |
| 11 | (United Arab Emirates) Khalid Al-Qassimi | | | | | | 3 | | | 6 |
| 12 | (Australia) Dean Herridge | | | | | | | 3 | | 6 |
| 13 | (Russia) Alexander Dorosinskiy | | | | | | | | 3 | 6 |
| 14 | (United Kingdom) Nigel Heath | | | 4 | 11 | | Ret | | 8 | 6 |
| 15 | (Japan) Takuma Kamada | | | Ret | 12 | 8 | | | 4 | 6 |
| 16 | (Italy) Simone Campedelli | | | | | | 4 | | | 5 |
| 17 | (Czech Republic) Štěpán Vojtěch | | 7 | | | | | | | 2 |
| 18 | (Mexico) Francisco Name jr. | | 8 | | | | | | | 1 |
| - | (Argentina) Gabriel Pozzo | | Ret | Ret | 2 | 2 | | DSQ | | DSQ |
| - | (Argentina) Marcos Ligato | | 6 | 6 | 7 | 3 | | Ret | | DSQ |
| - | (Argentina) Sebastián Beltran | | Ret | 5 | 10 | 10 | | DSQ | | DSQ |
| Pos. | Driver | MON (Monaco) | MEX (Mexico) | ARG (Argentina) | GRC (Greece) | JPN (Japan) | CYP (Cyprus) | AUS (Australia) | NZL (New Zealand) | Pts |

Key
| Colour | Result |
|---|---|
| Gold | Winner |
| Silver | 2nd place |
| Bronze | 3rd place |
| Green | Points finish |
| Blue | Non-points finish |
| Blue | Non-classified finish (NC) |
| Purple | Did not finish (Ret) |
| Black | Excluded (EX) |
| Black | Disqualified (DSQ) |
| White | Did not start (DNS) |
| White | Cancelled (C) |
| Blank | Withdrew entry from the event (WD) |

== Events ==
| Colour | Rally Surface |
|---|---|
| Gold | Gravel |
| Silver | Tarmac |
| Blue | Snow/Ice |
| Bronze | Mixed Surface |

| Round | Rally name | Podium finishers | | | | Statistics | | | |
| Round | Rally name | Rank | Driver | Car | Time | Stages | Length | Starters | Finishers |
|---|---|---|---|---|---|---|---|---|---|
| 1 | (France) / (Monaco) Monte Carlo Rally (20–22 January) — Results and report | 1 | (Finland) Marcus Grönholm | Ford Focus RS WRC 06 | 4:11:43.9 | 18 | 366.39 km | 51 | 43 |
| 1 | (France) / (Monaco) Monte Carlo Rally (20–22 January) — Results and report | 2 | (France) Sébastien Loeb | Citroën Xsara WRC | 4:12:45.7 | 18 | 366.39 km | 51 | 43 |
| 1 | (France) / (Monaco) Monte Carlo Rally (20–22 January) — Results and report | 3 | (Finland) Toni Gardemeister | Peugeot 307 WRC | 4:13:07.0 | 18 | 366.39 km | 51 | 43 |
| 2 | (Sweden) Swedish Rally (3–5 February) — Results and report | 1 | (Finland) Marcus Grönholm | Ford Focus RS WRC 06 | 3:09:01.9 | 19 | 349.02 km | 63 | 51 |
| 2 | (Sweden) Swedish Rally (3–5 February) — Results and report | 2 | (France) Sébastien Loeb | Citroën Xsara WRC | 3:09:32.8 | 19 | 349.02 km | 63 | 51 |
| 2 | (Sweden) Swedish Rally (3–5 February) — Results and report | 3 | (Sweden) Daniel Carlsson | Mitsubishi Lancer WRC 05 | 3:11:58.7 | 19 | 349.02 km | 63 | 51 |
| 3 | Rally Mexico (3–5 March) — Results and report | 1 | (France) Sébastien Loeb | Citroën Xsara WRC | 3:47:08.8 | 17 | 359.54 km | 39 | 33 |
| 3 | Rally Mexico (3–5 March) — Results and report | 2 | (Norway) Petter Solberg | Subaru Impreza WRC 06 | 3:47:57.7 | 17 | 359.54 km | 39 | 33 |
| 3 | Rally Mexico (3–5 March) — Results and report | 3 | (Austria) Manfred Stohl | Peugeot 307 WRC | 3:51:47.9 | 17 | 359.54 km | 39 | 33 |
| 4 | (Spain) Rally Catalunya (24–26 March) — Results and report | 1 | (France) Sébastien Loeb | Citroën Xsara WRC | 3:22:01.7 | 16 | 346.43 km | 66 | 56 |
| 4 | (Spain) Rally Catalunya (24–26 March) — Results and report | 2 | (Spain) Dani Sordo | Citroën Xsara WRC | 3:22:49.9 | 16 | 346.43 km | 66 | 56 |
| 4 | (Spain) Rally Catalunya (24–26 March) — Results and report | 3 | (Finland) Marcus Grönholm | Ford Focus RS WRC 06 | 3:23:47.5 | 16 | 346.43 km | 66 | 56 |
| 5 | (France) Tour de Corse (7–9 April) — Results and report | 1 | (France) Sébastien Loeb | Citroën Xsara WRC | 3:43:05.4 | 12 | 354.18 km | 75 | 60 |
| 5 | (France) Tour de Corse (7–9 April) — Results and report | 2 | (Finland) Marcus Grönholm | Ford Focus RS WRC 06 | 3:43:34.4 | 12 | 354.18 km | 75 | 60 |
| 5 | (France) Tour de Corse (7–9 April) — Results and report | 3 | (Spain) Daniel Sordo | Citroën Xsara WRC | 3:44:54.1 | 12 | 354.18 km | 75 | 60 |
| 6 | Rally Argentina (28–30 April) — Results and report | 1 | (France) Sébastien Loeb | Citroën Xsara WRC | 4:06:51.3 | 22 | 351.44 km | 68 | 57 |
| 6 | Rally Argentina (28–30 April) — Results and report | 2 | (Norway) Petter Solberg | Subaru Impreza WRC 06 | 4:07:35.9 | 22 | 351.44 km | 68 | 57 |
| 6 | Rally Argentina (28–30 April) — Results and report | 3 | (Italy) Gianluigi Galli | Peugeot 307 WRC | 4:10:15.6 | 22 | 351.44 km | 68 | 57 |
| 7 | (Italy) Rally d'Italia Sardegna (19–21 May) — Results and report | 1 | (France) Sébastien Loeb | Citroën Xsara WRC | 3:54:18.9 | 18 | 344.94 km | 79 | 60 |
| 7 | (Italy) Rally d'Italia Sardegna (19–21 May) — Results and report | 2 | (Finland) Mikko Hirvonen | Ford Focus RS WRC 06 | 3:57:00.3 | 18 | 344.94 km | 79 | 60 |
| 7 | (Italy) Rally d'Italia Sardegna (19–21 May) — Results and report | 3 | (Spain) Daniel Sordo | Citroën Xsara WRC | 3:57:46.6 | 18 | 344.94 km | 79 | 60 |
| 8 | (Greece) Acropolis Rally (2–4 June) — Results and report | 1 | (Finland) Marcus Grönholm | Ford Focus RS WRC 06 | 3:56:26.8 | 18 | 355.62 km | 84 | 69 |
| 8 | (Greece) Acropolis Rally (2–4 June) — Results and report | 2 | (France) Sébastien Loeb | Citroën Xsara WRC | 3:58:53.2 | 18 | 355.62 km | 84 | 69 |
| 8 | (Greece) Acropolis Rally (2–4 June) — Results and report | 3 | (Finland) Mikko Hirvonen | Ford Focus RS WRC 06 | 4:00:10.2 | 18 | 355.62 km | 84 | 69 |
| 9 | (Germany) Rallye Deutschland (11–13 August) — Results and report | 1 | (France) Sébastien Loeb | Citroën Xsara WRC | 3:28:34.1 | 19 | 351.55 km | 73 | 56 |
| 9 | (Germany) Rallye Deutschland (11–13 August) — Results and report | 2 | (Spain) Dani Sordo | Citroën Xsara WRC | 3:29:07.9 | 19 | 351.55 km | 73 | 56 |
| 9 | (Germany) Rallye Deutschland (11–13 August) — Results and report | 3 | (Finland) Marcus Grönholm | Ford Focus RS WRC 06 | 3:30:53.3 | 19 | 351.55 km | 73 | 56 |
| 10 | Rally Finland (18–20 August) — Results and report | 1 | (Finland) Marcus Grönholm | Ford Focus RS WRC 06 | 2:52:50.3 | 21 | 351.61 km | 101 | 68 |
| 10 | Rally Finland (18–20 August) — Results and report | 2 | (France) Sébastien Loeb | Citroën Xsara WRC | 2:53:57.0 | 21 | 351.61 km | 101 | 68 |
| 10 | Rally Finland (18–20 August) — Results and report | 3 | (Finland) Mikko Hirvonen | Ford Focus RS WRC 06 | 2:54:24.8 | 21 | 351.61 km | 101 | 68 |
| 11 | Rally Japan (1–3 September) — Results and report | 1 | (France) Sébastien Loeb | Citroën Xsara WRC | 3:22:20.4 | 27 | 345.72 km | 87 | 78 |
| 11 | Rally Japan (1–3 September) — Results and report | 2 | (Finland) Marcus Grönholm | Ford Focus RS WRC 06 | 3:22:26.0 | 27 | 345.72 km | 87 | 78 |
| 11 | Rally Japan (1–3 September) — Results and report | 3 | (Finland) Mikko Hirvonen | Ford Focus RS WRC 06 | 3:25:06.9 | 27 | 345.72 km | 87 | 78 |
| 12 | Cyprus Rally (22–24 September) — Results and report | 1 | (France) Sébastien Loeb | Citroën Xsara WRC | 4:40:50.4 | 22 | 322.51 km | 39 | 27 |
| 12 | Cyprus Rally (22–24 September) — Results and report | 2 | (Finland) Marcus Grönholm | Ford Focus RS WRC 06 | 4:41:01.6 | 22 | 322.51 km | 39 | 27 |
| 12 | Cyprus Rally (22–24 September) — Results and report | 3 | (Finland) Mikko Hirvonen | Ford Focus RS WRC 06 | 4:46:06.19 | 22 | 322.51 km | 39 | 27 |
| 13 | Rally of Turkey (13–15 October) — Results and report | 1 | (Finland) Marcus Grönholm | Ford Focus RS WRC 06 | 3:28:16.3 | 19 | 337.79 km | 67 | 51 |
| 13 | Rally of Turkey (13–15 October) — Results and report | 2 | (Finland) Mikko Hirvonen | Ford Focus RS WRC 06 | 3:30:39.7 | 19 | 337.79 km | 67 | 51 |
| 13 | Rally of Turkey (13–15 October) — Results and report | 3 | (Norway) Henning Solberg | Peugeot 307 WRC | 3:31:22.3 | 19 | 337.79 km | 67 | 51 |
| 14 | Rally Australia (27–29 October) — Results and report | 1 | (Finland) Mikko Hirvonen | Ford Focus RS WRC 06 | 3:15:11.8 | 26 | 348.51 km | 56 | 45 |
| 14 | Rally Australia (27–29 October) — Results and report | 2 | (Norway) Petter Solberg | Subaru Impreza WRC 06 | 3:15:48.9 | 26 | 348.51 km | 56 | 45 |
| 14 | Rally Australia (27–29 October) — Results and report | 3 | (Austria) Manfred Stohl | Peugeot 307 WRC | 3:19:10.4 | 26 | 348.51 km | 56 | 45 |
| 15 | Rally New Zealand (17–19 November) — Results and report | 1 | (Finland) Marcus Grönholm | Ford Focus RS WRC 06 | 4:02:30.7 | 17 | 354.21 km | 44 | 37 |
| 15 | Rally New Zealand (17–19 November) — Results and report | 2 | (Finland) Mikko Hirvonen | Ford Focus RS WRC 06 | 4:03:26.7 | 17 | 354.21 km | 44 | 37 |
| 15 | Rally New Zealand (17–19 November) — Results and report | 3 | (Austria) Manfred Stohl | Peugeot 307 WRC | 4:05:10.0 | 17 | 354.21 km | 44 | 37 |
| 16 | (United Kingdom) Wales Rally GB (1–3 December) — Results and report | 1 | (Finland) Marcus Grönholm | Ford Focus RS WRC 06 | 3:20:24.8 | 17 | 355.92 km | 111 | 82 |
| 16 | (United Kingdom) Wales Rally GB (1–3 December) — Results and report | 2 | (Austria) Manfred Stohl | Peugeot 307 WRC | 3:22:0.3 | 17 | 355.92 km | 111 | 82 |
| 16 | (United Kingdom) Wales Rally GB (1–3 December) — Results and report | 3 | (Norway) Petter Solberg | Subaru Impreza WRC 06 | 3:22:20.0 | 17 | 355.92 km | 111 | 82 |
