= Dean Herridge =

Australian rally driver (born 1976)

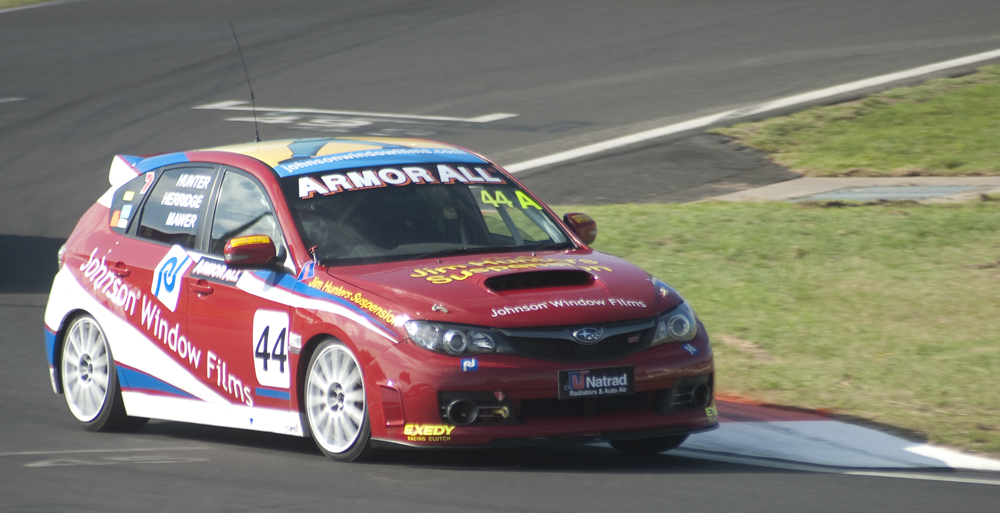

Personal information
- Nationality: (Australia) Australian
- Born: 23 August 1976 (age 50)

World Rally Championship record
- Years active: 1995–2006
- Co-driver: (Australia) Jim Carlton (New Zealand) Rod van der Straaten (Australia) Lyndall Drake (Australia) Glenn MacNeall (Australia) Mark Stacey (Australia) William Hayes (Australia) Amber Herridge
- Teams: Subaru
- Rallies: 18
- Championships: 0
- Rally wins: 0
- Podiums: 0
- Stage wins: 0
- Total points: 1
- First rally: 1995 Rally Australia

Dean Allen Herridge (born 23 August 1976) is an Australian rally driver. He finished eighth on the 2006 Rally Australia, scoring one World Rally Championship point.

== Career ==
Herridge began rallying in 1994. He contested his first World Rally Championship event the following year on Rally Australia in a Hyundai Lantra, retiring from the rally. In 1996, he contested three rounds of the Asia-Pacific Rally Championship for Kia, finishing 15th overall on Rally Indonesia, a WRC round. He then drove for Hyundai in 1997 and 1998, winning the Australian 2 litre championship in both years.

Driving a Subaru, Herridge won the Privateer Cup in the Australian Rally Championship in 2000 and 2001. This earned him a factory driver with Subaru Rally Team Australia in 2002. He remained with the team until the end of 2005. He won the Group N category on Rally New Zealand in 2004, and was Australian championship runner-up in 2005.

As a privateer, Herridge finished third overall in the 2006 and 2007 Australian championships, winning the Privateer title in both years. On 2006 Rally Australia, he finished eighth overall and third in the PWRC category. In 2008, he contested the Chinese Rally Championship for Subaru China, also claiming the FIA Pacific Cup title. In 2011, he won the Australian Targa Championship in a Subaru.
