= 2006 Rally Argentina =

Rallying motorsport event

2006 Rally Argentina 26° Rally Argentina
Round 6 of the 2006 World Rally Championship
← Previous event	Next event →
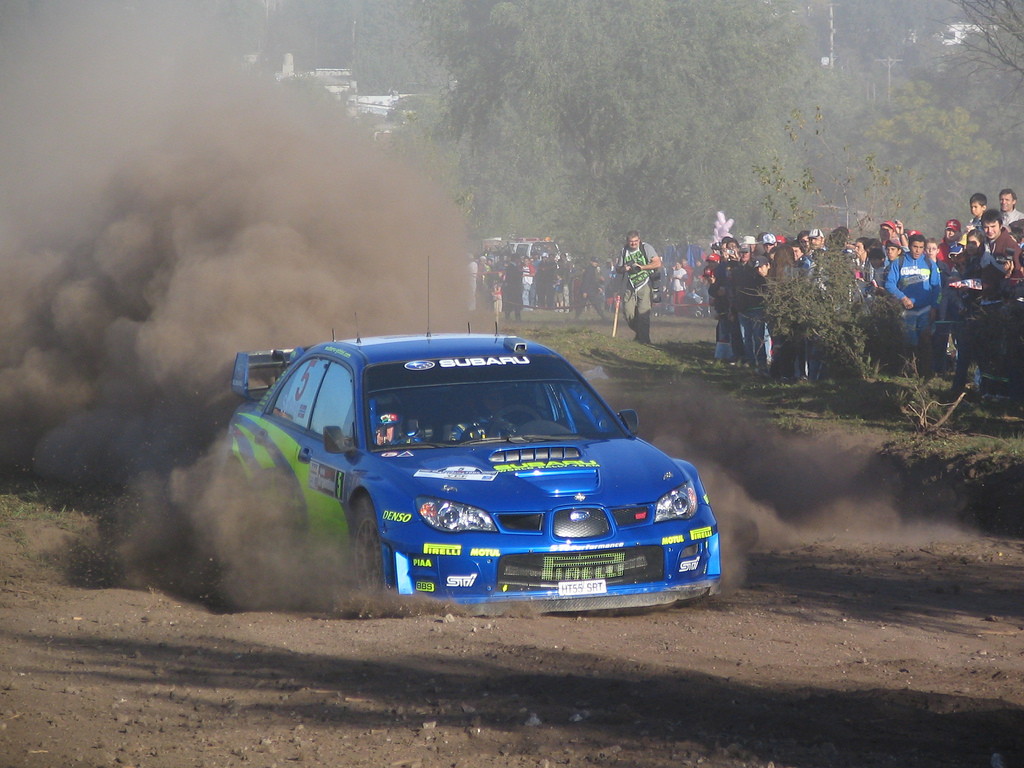
- Petter Solberg during shakedown.
- Dates run: April 27 – 30 2006
- Stages: 22
- Stage surface: Gravel

Statistics
- Crews: 67 at start, 57 at finish

Overall results
- Overall winner: (France) Sébastien Loeb (Belgium) Kronos Total Citroën World Rally Team

The 26° Rally Argentina, the sixth round of the 2006 World Rally Championship season took place between April 27 and April 30, 2006.

== Results ==
Pos.	Driver	Co-driver	Car	Time	Difference	Points
WRC
1	(France) Sébastien Loeb	(Monaco) Daniel Elena	Citroën Xsara WRC	4:06:51.3	0.0	10
2	(Norway) Petter Solberg	(United Kingdom) Phil Mills	Subaru Impreza WRC 2006	4:07:35.9	44.6	8
3	(Italy) Gianluigi Galli	(Italy) Giovanni Bernacchini	Peugeot 307 WRC	4:10:15.6	3:24.3	6
4	(Austria) Manfred Stohl	(Austria) Ilka Minor	Peugeot 307 WRC	4:10:31.3	3:40.0	5
5	(Spain) Daniel Sordo	(Spain) Marc Marti	Citroën Xsara WRC	4:12:31.5	5:40.2	4
6	(Australia) Chris Atkinson	(Australia) Glenn MacNeall	Subaru Impreza WRC 2006	4:12:35.1	5:43.8	3
7	(Norway) Henning Solberg	(Norway) Cato Menkerud	Peugeot 307 WRC	4:16:20.0	9:28.7	2
8	(United Kingdom) Matthew Wilson	(United Kingdom) Michael Orr	Ford Focus RS WRC 04	4:17:25.9	10:34.6	1
JWRC
1	(United Kingdom) Guy Wilks	(United Kingdom) Phil Pugh	Suzuki Swift Super 1600	4:44:46.9	0.0	10
2	(Sweden) Patrik Sandell	(Sweden) Emil Axelsson	Renault Clio Super 1600	4:54:06.4	9:19.5	8
3	(Sweden) Per-Gunnar Andersson	(Sweden) Jonas Andersson	Suzuki Swift Super 1600	5:13:47.9	29:10.0	6
4	(Estonia) Jaan Mölder	(Germany) Katrin Becker	Ford Fiesta Super 1600	5:40:26.5	55:39.6	5
PWRC
1	(Qatar) Nasser Al-Attiyah	(United Kingdom) Chris Patterson	Subaru Impreza Spec C	4:32:44.0	0.0	10
2	(Poland) Leszek Kuzaj	(Poland) Maciek Szczepaniak	Subaru Impreza	4:34:14.4	1:30.4	8
3	(San Marino) Mirco Baldacci	(Italy) Agnese Giovanni	Mitsubishi Lancer Evolution IX	4:46:52.2	14:08.2	6
4	(United Kingdom) Nigel Heath	(United Kingdom) Steve Lancaster	Subaru Impreza Spec C	4:55:10.2	22:26.2	5
5	(Argentina) Sebastián Beltrán	(Chile) Ricardo Rojas	Mitsubishi Lancer Evolution IX	4:55:12.2	22:28.2	4
6	(Argentina) Marcos Ligato	(Argentina) Ruben Garcia	Mitsubishi Lancer Evolution IX	5:03:36.7	30:52.7	3
7	(Italy) Stefano Marrini	(Italy) Tiziana Sandroni	Mitsubishi Lancer Evolution VIII	5:08:32.4	35:48.4	2
8	(Japan) Toshihiro Arai	(New Zealand) Tony Sircombe	Subaru Impreza	5:10:21.0	37:37.0	1

== Special Stages ==
All dates and times are ART (UTC-3).

Day	Stage	Time	Name	Length	Winner	Time	Rally leader
1 (27 APR) (28 APR)	SS1	19:05	Super Especial 1	2.2 km	(Norway) Petter Solberg	2:26.4	(Norway) Petter Solberg
1 (27 APR) (28 APR)	SS2	19:08	Super Especial 2	2.2 km	(Finland) Marcus Grönholm	2:25.9	(Finland) Marcus Grönholm
1 (27 APR) (28 APR)	SS3	08:33	Ascochinga 1	23.28 km	(Norway) Petter Solberg	14:49.8	(Norway) Petter Solberg
1 (27 APR) (28 APR)	SS4	09:36	Capilla del Monte 1	22.95 km	(France) Sébastien Loeb	17:27.0	(Norway) Petter Solberg
1 (27 APR) (28 APR)	SS5	10:13	San Marcos 1	19.23 km	(France) Sébastien Loeb	11:39.7	(Finland) Marcus Grönholm
1 (27 APR) (28 APR)	SS6	11:46	Cabalango 1	14.52 km	(Finland) Marcus Grönholm	9:51.9	(Finland) Marcus Grönholm
1 (27 APR) (28 APR)	SS7	14:44	La Falda 1	11.77 km	(France) Sébastien Loeb	7:34.9	(Finland) Marcus Grönholm
1 (27 APR) (28 APR)	SS8	15:29	Capilla 2	22.95 km	(France) Sébastien Loeb	17:10.8	(France) Sébastien Loeb
1 (27 APR) (28 APR)	SS9	16:06	San Marcos 2	19.23 km	(Norway) Petter Solberg	11:30.0	(France) Sébastien Loeb
1 (27 APR) (28 APR)	SS10	16:59	La Cumbre 1	21.37 km	(Austria) Manfred Stohl	18:26.3	(France) Sébastien Loeb
2 (29 APR)	SS11	08:07	La Falda 2	11.77 km	(Finland) Marcus Grönholm	7:45.6	(France) Sébastien Loeb
2 (29 APR)	SS12	08:48	La Cumbre 2	21.37 km	(Finland) Marcus Grönholm	18:19.0	(France) Sébastien Loeb
2 (29 APR)	SS13	09:41	Ascochinga 2	23.28 km	(Spain) Xavier Pons	15:06.1	(France) Sébastien Loeb
2 (29 APR)	SS14	11:24	Cabalango 2	14.52 km	(France) Sébastien Loeb	9:46.7	(France) Sébastien Loeb
2 (29 APR)	SS15	14:42	Santa Rosa 1	21.4 km	(Finland) Marcus Grönholm	13:08.5	(France) Sébastien Loeb
2 (29 APR)	SS16	15:35	Las Bajadas	16.35 km	(Norway) Petter Solberg (Norway) Henning Solberg	8:50.5	(France) Sébastien Loeb
2 (29 APR)	SS17	16:21	Amboy	20.29 km	(Norway) Petter Solberg	10:30.1	(France) Sébastien Loeb
2 (29 APR)	SS18	17:26	Santa Rosa 2	21.4 km	(Finland) Marcus Grönholm	13:02.5	(France) Sébastien Loeb
3 (APR 30)	SS19	09:43	Mina Clavero	20.07 km	(Austria) Manfred Stohl	17:03.2	(France) Sébastien Loeb
3 (APR 30)	SS20	10:33	El Condor	16.81 km	(Norway) Petter Solberg	13:40.2	(France) Sébastien Loeb
3 (APR 30)	SS21	13:05	Super Especial 3	2.2 km	(Finland) Marcus Grönholm	2:22.5	(France) Sébastien Loeb
3 (APR 30)	SS22	13:08	Super Especial 4	2.2 km	(United Kingdom) Matthew Wilson	2:23.7	(France) Sébastien Loeb
