= Alexander Dorosinskiy =

Russian rally driver (born 1973)

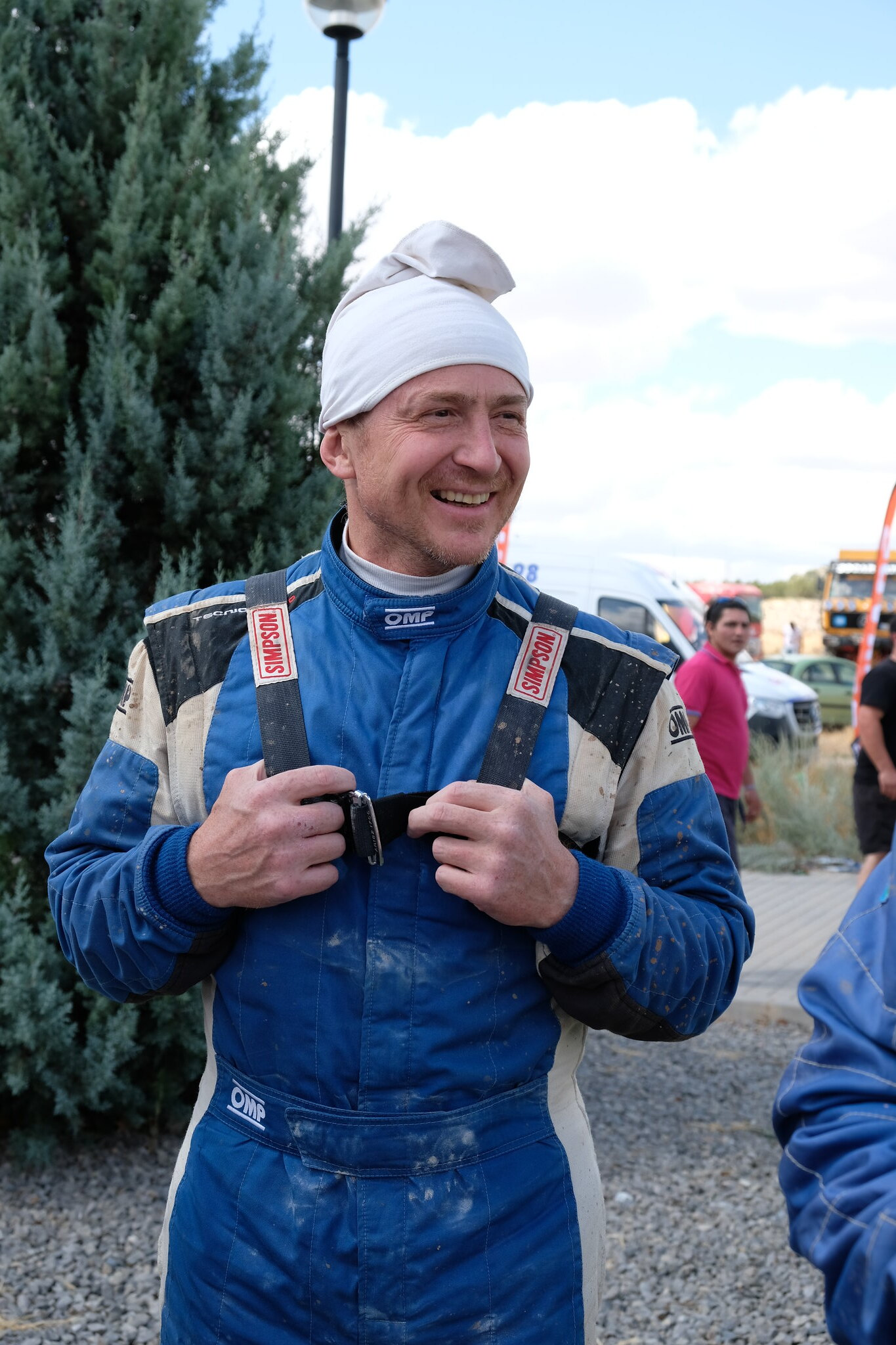
- Alexander Dorosinskiy, season 2019
- Nationality: Russian
- Born: Alexander Leonidovich Dorosinskiy; 13 August 1973 (age 53) Yekaterinburg, Russia

Championship titles
- 2004: Estonian Rally Champion

Awards
- 3rd place at the 2006 Rally of New Zealand; 3rd place at the 2006 Rally Championship of Finland winner of the Dakar 2017 (as a coach); 3rd place at 2019 Rally Morocco

Alexander Leonidovich Dorosinskiy (Russian: Алекса́ндр Леони́дович Дороси́нский; born August 13, 1973, Sverdlovsk, USSR) is a Russian racing car driver and entrepreneur, the champion of Estonian classic rally 2004, a prize-winner of the stages of the World Rally Championship, the World Cup for Cross-Country Rallies, and The FIA World Cup for Cross-Country Bajas.

== Biography ==
Dorosinskiy was born in Sverdlovsk on August 13, 1973, in the family of a teacher of the Ural Polytechnic Institute Leonid Grigoryevich Dorosinskiy (now - a professor and a doctor of technical sciences) and a teacher Anna Vladimirovna Dorosinskiy (now - an honored teacher of Russia). In his own words, Dorosinskiy's interest in motorsport arose in childhood due to his frequent trips all over the Soviet Union in his father's Zhiguli car, which his father taught him to drive at the age of 12. He then began to attend kart racing classes, and at the age of 27 he went on to become a professional racing driver - through a former racing driver Vladimir Talanov, a champion of Russia.

Dorosinskiy studied at the Ural State Medical University, but he dropped out after the second year of studies. In 2005, he graduated from the Ural State University of Economics. In 2001, Dorosinskiy began entrepreneurial activity, launching “SIMphony” network of mobile communication salons, which in 2005 already had 111 stores in the Sverdlovsk, Chelyabinsk, Kurgan and Tyumen regions, and its share in the Ural mobile retail market was 17-18%. In 2005, he founded “Mirai-Avto” company, which became the official dealer of Subaru cars in Tyumen, and then opened a Subaru service center in Surgut. According to Dorosinskiy, his business was aimed primarily at the opportunity to engage in car racing. At the same time he was developing a career in motorsport and in October 2004 he became the winner of the Estonian Classic Rally Championship in N2000+ class (the main one that year) with three prizes in the absolute at the stages of the tournament. In the same year he made his debut at the stage of the World Rally Championship in Finland.

In 2005, Dorosinskiy together with a racing car driver Sergey Uspensky founded the rally team "Subaru Team Russia", which was even called ‘the Russian rally team’ in the press. In the same year, a team with Dorosinskiy took part in the World Rally Championship at the stage in Cyprus, and in 2006 Dorosinskiy’s crew took a third place in the Production category in the Rally New Zealand. In the same year, Dorosinskiy became the third in the overall classification of the stage of the Finnish Rally Championship (at SM Waltikka Ralli). His result was the best achievement ever made by Russians at Finnish rallies before Nikolay Gryazin won the Finland Rally 2019 at The FIA World Rally Championship-2. According to the results of the entire 2006 season, Dorosinskiy took eighth place in the A8 class of the Finnish championship. In 2007, as a part of a crew with a navigator Dmitry Eremeev, he took part in the Rally Sweden, the Rally Mexico, and the Rally Argentina.

In 2009, 2017 and 2018, he took part in Russian “Can-Am-X-Race”. Also in 2018, he was a part of a crew with a navigator Oleg Uperenko in the Morocco Rally in the all-terrain vehicle class. In 2019, he took part in the Dakar Rally in Peru as part of the Russian crew of all-terrain vehicles. Also for a long time Dorosinskiy was a coach of a racing driver Sergey Karyakin, who won the Dakar rally in 2017 in the classification of all-terrain vehicles. In 2019, the crew of Dorosinskiy and Oleg Uperenko performed in three stages of the FIA World Cup for Cross-Country Bajas, and they took fifth place in Bajas Italy, second place in Bajas Aragon and third one in Hungarian Bajas in T3 class (10, 15 and 10 places in the absolute), which provided Alexander the fifth place following the results of the tournament in his category. Also in 2019, Dorosinskiy and Uperenko took part in the Morocco Rally for the second year in a row - the final stage of the World Cup in rally-raids, their crew took third place in the T3 class and ninth in the overall classification. He is currently a pilot of the Sport Racing Technologies rally team, driving a buggy.
