= 2006 Wales Rally GB =

Rally car race

2006 Wales Rally GB 62nd Wales Rally of Great Britain
Round 16 of the 2006 World Rally Championship
← Previous event
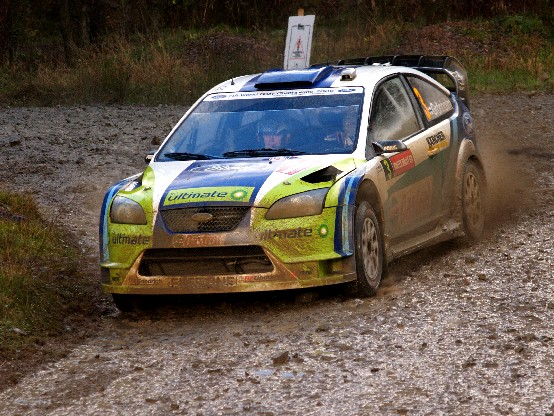
- Marcus Grönholm during one of the Crychan Forest stages.
- Dates run: December 1 – 3 2006
- Stages: 17
- Stage surface: Gravel

Statistics
- Crews: 111 at start, 82 at finish

Overall results
- Overall winner: (Finland) Marcus Grönholm (United Kingdom) BP Ford World Rally Team

The 2006 Wales Rally GB was the final round of the 2006 World Rally Championship season. It took place between December 1–3, 2006.

== Results ==
Pos.	Driver	Co-driver	Car	Time	Difference	Points
WRC
1	(Finland) Marcus Grönholm	(Finland) Timo Rautiainen	Ford Focus RS WRC 06	3:20:24.8	0.0	10
2	(Austria) Manfred Stohl	(Austria) Ilka Minor	Peugeot 307 WRC	3:22:00.3	1:35.5	8
3	(Norway) Petter Solberg	(United Kingdom) Phil Mills	Subaru Impreza WRC 06	3:22:20.0	1:55.2	6
4	(Finland) Jari-Matti Latvala	(Finland) Miikka Anttila	Ford Focus RS WRC 06	3:23:01.9	2:37.1	5
5	(Spain) Xavier Pons	(Spain) Carlos Del Barrio	Citroën Xsara WRC	3:23:44.7	3:19.9	4
6	(Australia) Chris Atkinson	(Australia) Glenn MacNeall	Subaru Impreza WRC 06	3:23:52.3	3:27.5	3
7	(Spain) Dani Sordo	(Spain) Marc Marti	Citroën Xsara WRC	3:24:33.1	4:08.3	2
8	(Belgium) François Duval	(France) Patrick Pivato	Škoda Fabia WRC	3:24:47.4	4:22.6	1
JWRC
1.	(Estonia) Jaan Mölder	(Germany) Katrin Becker	Suzuki Swift S1600	3:55:04.7	0.0	10
2.	(Italy) Luca Betti	(Italy) Piercarlo Capolongo	Renault Clio S1600	3:57:00.3	1:55.6	8
3.	(Germany) Aaron Burkart	(Germany) Tanja Geilhausen	Citroën C2 S1600	4:00:50.2	5:45.5	6
4.	(United Kingdom) Barry Clark	(United Kingdom) Scott Martin	Ford Fiesta ST	4:04:23.2	9:18.5	5
5.	(France) Fabio Fiandino	(France) Sabrina de Castelli	Citroën C2 R2	4:04:53.2	9:48.5	4
6.	(Sweden) Patrik Sandell	(Sweden) Emil Axelsson	Renault Clio S1600	4:06:07.4	11:02.7	3
7.	(United Kingdom) James Wozencroft	(United Kingdom) Robert Fagg	Suzuki Ignis S1600	4:06:30.6	11:25.9	2
8.	(Italy) Andrea Cortinovis	(Italy) Massimiliano Bosi	Renault Clio RS	4:07:48.8	12:44.1	1

== Special Stages ==
All dates and times are GMT (UTC).

Day	Stage	Time	Name	Length (km)	Winner	Time	Rally leader
1 (1 Dec)	SS1	09:17	Port Talbot 1	17.41	(Finland) Marcus Grönholm	9:08.7	(Finland) Marcus Grönholm
1 (1 Dec)	SS2	10:02	Resolfen 1	24.49	(Finland) Marcus Grönholm	12:26.4	(Finland) Marcus Grönholm
1 (1 Dec)	SS3	10:54	Rheola 1	27.91	(Finland) Marcus Grönholm	15:34.5	(Finland) Marcus Grönholm
1 (1 Dec)	SS4	13:33	Port Talbot 2	17.41	(Austria) Manfred Stohl	9:10.9	(Finland) Marcus Grönholm
1 (1 Dec)	SS5	14:18	Resolfen 2	24.49	(Finland) Marcus Grönholm (Norway) Petter Solberg	12:41.8	(Finland) Marcus Grönholm
1 (1 Dec)	SS6	15:10	Rheola 2	27.91	(Norway) Petter Solberg	15:39.3	(Finland) Marcus Grönholm
2 (2 Dec)	SS7	08:50	Crychan 1	19.47	(Spain) Xavier Pons	10:42.6	(Finland) Marcus Grönholm
2 (2 Dec)	SS8	09:24	Epynt 1	13.76	(Finland) Marcus Grönholm	7:40.4	(Finland) Marcus Grönholm
2 (2 Dec)	SS9	10:01	Halfway 1	18.37	(Finland) Marcus Grönholm	10:35.9	(Finland) Marcus Grönholm
2 (2 Dec)	SS10	13:37	Crychan 2	19.47	(Austria) Manfred Stohl	10:47.7	(Finland) Marcus Grönholm
2 (2 Dec)	SS11	14:11	Epynt 2	13.76	(Finland) Marcus Grönholm	7:39.3	(Finland) Marcus Grönholm
2 (2 Dec)	SS12	14:48	Halfway 2	18.37	(Finland) Marcus Grönholm	10:34.4	(Finland) Marcus Grönholm
2 (2 Dec)	SS13	17:06	Cardiff	1.10	(Finland) Marcus Grönholm	1:01.5	(Finland) Marcus Grönholm
3 (15 Oct)	SS14	07:47	Brechfa 1	28.89	(Norway) Petter Solberg	16:25.8	(Finland) Marcus Grönholm
3 (15 Oct)	SS15	08:44	Trawscoed 1	27.11	(Spain) Dani Sordo	16:19.3	(Finland) Marcus Grönholm
3 (15 Oct)	SS16	11:46	Brechfa 2	28.89	(Norway) Petter Solberg	16:33.1	(Finland) Marcus Grönholm
3 (15 Oct)	SS17	12:43	Trawscoed 2	27.11	(Norway) Petter Solberg	16:22.2	(Finland) Marcus Grönholm

Previous event: 2006 Rally New Zealand	FIA World Rally Championship, 2006 season	Next event: 2007 Monte Carlo Rally
Previous year: 2005 Rally GB	Rally GB	Next year: 2007 Rally GB
