= 2006 Rally New Zealand =

Rallying motorsport event

2006 Rally New Zealand 36th Propecia Rally New Zealand
Round 15 of the 2006 World Rally Championship
← Previous event	Next event →
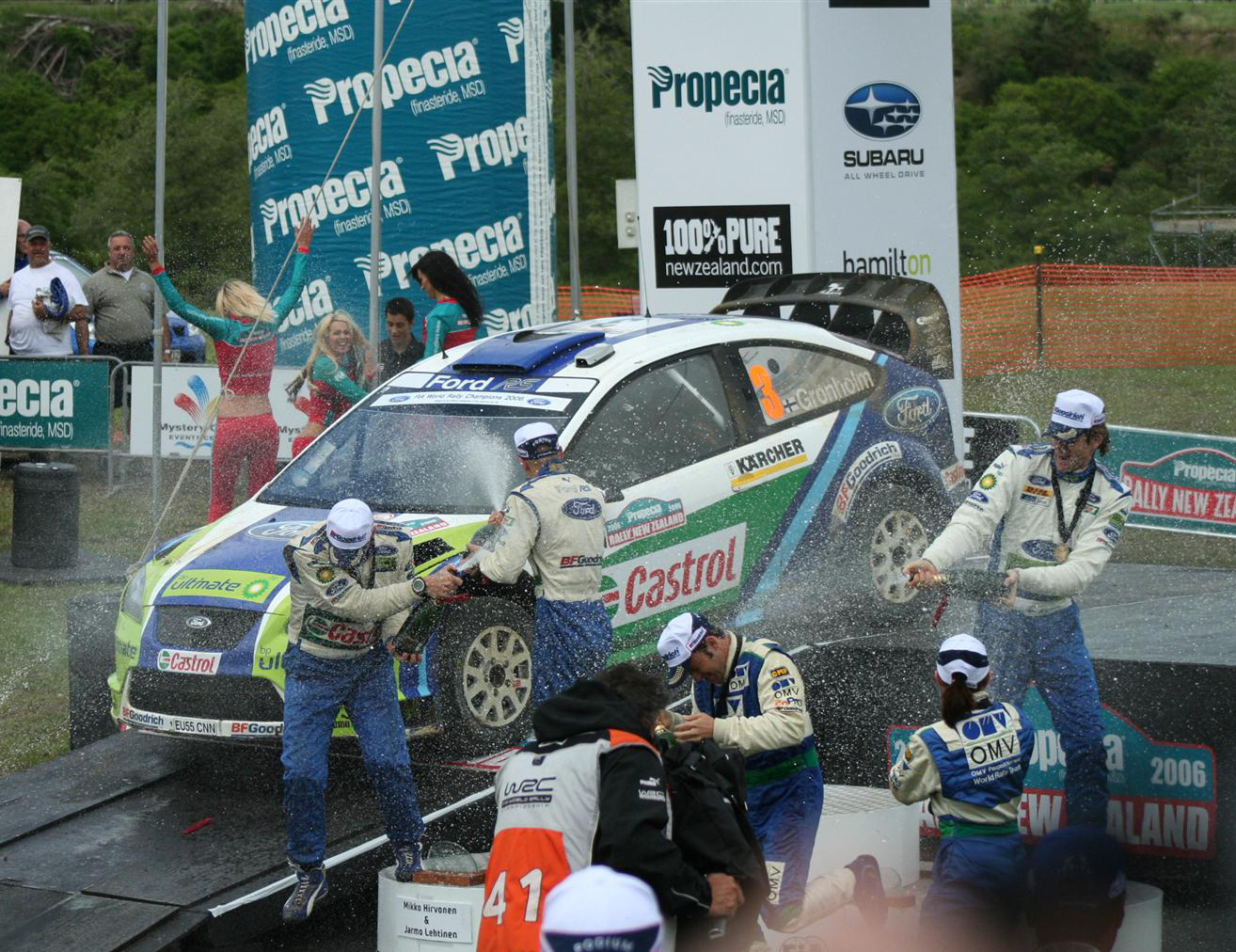
- Top three drivers celebrating on the podium.
- Dates run: 17 – 19 November 2006
- Stages: 17
- Stage surface: Gravel

Statistics
- Crews: 43 at start, 37 at finish

Overall results
- Overall winner: (Finland) Marcus Grönholm (United Kingdom) BP Ford World Rally Team

The 2006 Propecia Rally New Zealand was the penultimate round of the 2006 World Rally Championship season. It took place between 17 and 19 November 2006.

Marcus Grönholm won and teammate Mikko Hirvonen placed second, sealed the Ford's first manufacturers’ world title since 1979.

== Results ==
Pos.	Driver	Co-driver	Car	Time	Difference	Points
WRC
1	(Finland) Marcus Grönholm	(Finland) Timo Rautiainen	Ford Focus RS WRC 06	4:02:30.7	0.0	10
2	(Finland) Mikko Hirvonen	(Finland) Jarmo Lehtinen	Ford Focus RS WRC 06	4:03:26.7	56.0	8
3	(Austria) Manfred Stohl	(Austria) Ilka Minor	Peugeot 307 WRC	4:05:10.0	2:39.3	6
4	(Spain) Xavier Pons	(Spain) Carlos Del Barrio	Citroën Xsara WRC	4:05:26.8	2:56.1	5
5	(Spain) Dani Sordo	(Spain) Marc Marti	Citroën Xsara WRC	4:05:51.4	3:20.7	4
6	(Norway) Petter Solberg	(United Kingdom) Phil Mills	Subaru Impreza WRC 06	4:07:27.8	4:57.1	3
7	(Argentina) Luís Pérez Companc	(Argentina) José María Volta	Ford Focus RS WRC 06	4:13:22.3	10:51.6	2
8	(Finland) Jari-Matti Latvala	(Finland) Miikka Anttila	Subaru Impreza WRX STi	4:18:53.1	16:22.4	1
PWRC
1.	(Finland) Jari-Matti Latvala	(Finland) Miikka Anttila	Subaru Impreza WRX STi	4:18:53.1	0.0	10
2.	(New Zealand) Richard Mason	(New Zealand) Sara Mason-Randall	Subaru Impreza WRX STi	4:22:50.7	3:57.6	8
3.	(Russia) Alexander Dorosinskiy	(Russia) Dmitriy Yeremeyev	Subaru Impreza WRX Spec C	4:34:39.9	15:46.8	6
4.	(Japan) Takuma Kamada	(France) Denis Giraudet	Subaru Impreza WRX STi	4:35:39.2	16:46.1	5
5.	(San Marino) Mirco Baldacci	(Italy) Giovanni Agnese	Mitsubishi Lancer Evolution IX	4:37:45.1	18:52.0	4
6.	(Japan) Fumio Nutahara	(United Kingdom) Daniel Barritt	Mitsubishi Lancer Evolution IX	4:41:37.1	22:44.0	3
7.	(Qatar) Nasser al-Attiyah	(United Kingdom) Chris Patterson	Subaru Impreza WRX Spec C	4:47:41.9	28:48.8	2
8.	(United Kingdom) Nigel Heath	(United Kingdom) Steve Lancaster	Mitsubishi Lancer Evolution IX	4:54:58.3	36:05.2	1

== Special Stages ==
All dates and times are NZDT (UTC+13).

Day	Stage	Time	Name	Length (km)	Winner	Time	Rally leader
1 (17 Nov)	SS1	09:33	Pirongia West 1	20.38	(Finland) Marcus Grönholm	15:09.7	(Finland) Marcus Grönholm
1 (17 Nov)	SS2	10:31	Te Koraha 1	43.88	(Finland) Marcus Grönholm	29:44.7	(Finland) Marcus Grönholm
1 (17 Nov)	SS3	14:50	Pirongia West 2	20.38	(Finland) Marcus Grönholm	14:53.6	(Finland) Marcus Grönholm
1 (17 Nov)	SS4	15:48	Te Koraha 2	43.88	(Finland) Marcus Grönholm	29:10.2	(Finland) Marcus Grönholm
1 (17 Nov)	SS5	18:00	Mystery Creek Super Special 1	3.14	(Finland) Marcus Grönholm	2:59.8	(Finland) Marcus Grönholm
2 (18 Nov)	SS6	09:23	Port Waikato	18.18	(Finland) Marcus Grönholm	10:25.3	(Finland) Marcus Grönholm
2 (18 Nov)	SS7	10:01	Klondyke	13.88	(Australia) Chris Atkinson	11:18.9	(Finland) Marcus Grönholm
2 (18 Nov)	SS8	10:34	Wairamarama	31.58	(Australia) Chris Atkinson	22:23.3	(Finland) Marcus Grönholm
2 (18 Nov)	SS9	15:18	Te Akauth South	31.82	(Finland) Marcus Grönholm	18:37.4	(Finland) Marcus Grönholm
2 (18 Nov)	SS10	16:01	Te Akauth North	32.64	(Finland) Mikko Hirvonen	18:08.2	(Finland) Marcus Grönholm
2 (18 Nov)	SS11	19:34	Mystery Creek Super Special 2	3.14	(Finland) Marcus Grönholm	2:59.5	(Finland) Marcus Grönholm
3 (19 Nov)	SS12	07:38	Maungatawhiri 1	6.69	(Finland) Marcus Grönholm	3:40.6	(Finland) Marcus Grönholm
3 (19 Nov)	SS13	08:06	Te Hutewai 1	11.23	(Finland) Marcus Grönholm	7:56.2	(Finland) Marcus Grönholm
3 (19 Nov)	SS14	08:34	Whaanga Coast 1	29.82	(Finland) Marcus Grönholm	21:38.1	(Finland) Marcus Grönholm
3 (19 Nov)	SS15	12:03	Maungatawhiri 2	6.69	(Finland) Marcus Grönholm	3:37.5	(Finland) Marcus Grönholm
3 (19 Nov)	SS16	12:31	Te Hutewai 2	11.23	(Finland) Marcus Grönholm (Spain) Xavier Pons	7:57.7	(Finland) Marcus Grönholm
3 (19 Nov)	SS17	12:59	Whaanga Coast 2	29.82	(Spain) Xavier Pons	21:09.7	(Finland) Marcus Grönholm

== Notes ==
- Seven time MotoGP champion Valentino Rossi competed in his first rally since 2002 Rally GB.

Previous event: 2006 Rally Australia	FIA World Rally Championship, 2006 season	Next event: 2006 Rally GB
Previous year: 2005 Rally New Zealand	Rally New Zealand	Next year: 2007 Rally New Zealand
