= Nigel Heath =

British rally driver (born 1955)

Personal information
- Nationality: (United Kingdom) British
- Born: 1 July 1955 (age 71); Birmingham, United Kingdom

World Rally Championship record
- Years active: 1993-2006
- Co-driver: (United Kingdom) Tim Hely (United Kingdom) Jeff Ashfield (United Kingdom) Chris Patterson (United Kingdom) Steve Lancaster (United Kingdom) Alec Cooper
- Rallies: 40
- Championships: 0
- Rally wins: 0
- Podiums: 0
- Stage wins: 0
- Total points: 0
- First rally: 1993 RAC Rally
- Last rally: 2006 Rally New Zealand

Nigel Richard Mark Heath (born 1 July 1955) is an ex-rally driver from England. He raced in 40 World Rally Championship events, despite not scoring a single point, and also in the PWRC in 1999 and 2006.

In 2008, Heath was arrested for fraud and corruption in the UK in relation to his work as a solicitor.
