= 2006 Rally Australia =

Rallying motorsport event

2006 Rally Australia 19th Telstra Rally Australia
Round 14 of the 2006 World Rally Championship
← Previous event	Next event →
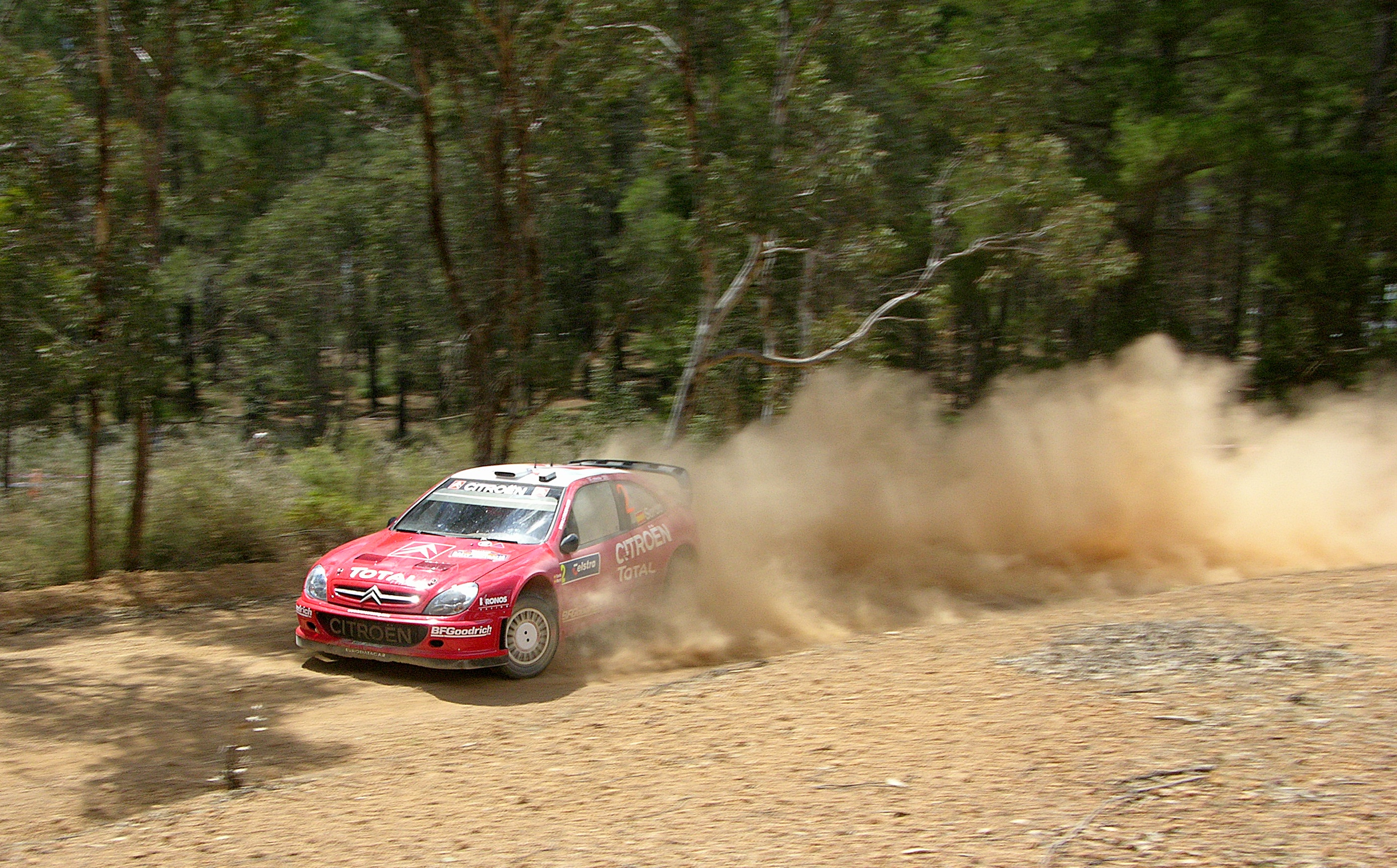
- Dani Sordo during SS19.
- Dates run: 26 October – 29 2006
- Stages: 26
- Stage surface: Gravel

Statistics
- Crews: 56 at start, 45 at finish

Overall results
- Overall winner: (Finland) Mikko Hirvonen (United Kingdom) BP Ford World Rally Team

The 2006 Telstra Rally Australia was the fourteenth round of the 2006 World Rally Championship season. It took place between 26 and 29 October 2006.

== Report ==
Ford's Mikko Hirvonen won the rally, taking his first victory of his career. His teammate Marcus Grönholm was only the Fifth to mathematically give the world championship to Sébastien Loeb, who was out of this race due to injury. Grönholm hit a rock, resulting in him losing eleven minutes and falling to 55th place. In order to maintain his chances for the championship, Grönholm had to rise to at least third place, but he was only able to collect four points, so Loeb, who witnessed the rally from home, celebrated the championship with two more races left.

== Results ==
Pos.	Driver	Co-driver	Car	Time	Difference	Points
WRC
1	(Finland) Mikko Hirvonen	(Finland) Jarmo Lehtinen	Ford Focus RS WRC 06	3:15:11.8	0.0	10
2	(Norway) Petter Solberg	(United Kingdom) Phil Mills	Subaru Impreza WRC 06	3:15:48.9	37.1	8
3	(Austria) Manfred Stohl	(Austria) Ilka Minor	Peugeot 307 WRC	3:19:10.4	3:58.6	6
4	(Spain) Xavier Pons	(Spain) Carlos Del Barrio	Citroën Xsara WRC	3:19:57.2	4:45.4	5
5	(Finland) Marcus Grönholm	(Finland) Timo Rautiainen	Ford Focus RS WRC 06	3:27:35.6	12:23.8	4
6	(Finland) Jari-Matti Latvala	(Finland) Miikka Anttila	Subaru Impreza WRX STi	3:32:21.0	17:09.2	3
7	(San Marino) Mirco Baldacci	(Italy) Giovanni Agnese	Mitsubishi Lancer Evolution IX	3:32:54.7	17:42.9	2
8	(Australia) Dean Herridge	(Australia) William Hayes	Subaru Impreza WRX STi	3:33:33.8	18:22.0	1
PWRC
1.	(Finland) Jari-Matti Latvala	(Finland) Miikka Anttila	Subaru Impreza WRX STi	3:32:21.0	0.0	10
2.	(San Marino) Mirco Baldacci	(Italy) Giovanni Agnese	Mitsubishi Lancer Evolution IX	3:32:54.7	33.7	8
3.	(Australia) Dean Herridge	(Australia) William Hayes	Subaru Impreza WRX STi	3:33:33.8	1:12.8	6
4.	(Finland) Aki Teiskonen	(Finland) Miika Teiskonen	Subaru Impreza WRX STi	3:42:31.1	10:10.1	5
5.	(Russia) Sergey Uspenskiy	(Russia) Dmitriy Yeremeyev	Subaru Impreza WRX STi	3:47:00.5	14:39.5	4
6.	(Italy) Stefano Marrini	(Italy) Tiziana Sandroni	Mitsubishi Lancer Evolution IX	3:51:18.5	18:57.5	3
7.	(Japan) Toshi Arai	(United Kingdom) Daniel Barritt	Mitsubishi Lancer Evolution IX	4:00:12.6	27:51.6	2

== Special Stages ==
All dates and times are AWST (UTC+8).

Day	Stage	Time	Name	Length (km)	Winner	Time	Rally leader
1 (26/27 Oct)	SS1	19:12	Perth City Super 1	2.00	(Finland) Marcus Grönholm	1:21.1	(Finland) Marcus Grönholm
1 (26/27 Oct)	SS2	19:21	Perth City Super 2	2.00	(Finland) Marcus Grönholm	1:20.7	(Finland) Marcus Grönholm
1 (26/27 Oct)	SS3	09:23	Murray North 1	15.92	(Australia) Chris Atkinson	8:55.4	(Australia) Chris Atkinson
1 (26/27 Oct)	SS4	09:56	Murray South 1	20.12	(Australia) Chris Atkinson	11:34.9	(Australia) Chris Atkinson
1 (26/27 Oct)	SS5	10:36	Holyoake	3.13	(Australia) Chris Atkinson	1:53.4	(Australia) Chris Atkinson
1 (26/27 Oct)	SS6	11:49	Murray North 2	15.92	(Norway) Petter Solberg	8:50.0	(Finland) Mikko Hirvonen
1 (26/27 Oct)	SS7	12:22	Murray South 2	20.12	(Norway) Petter Solberg	11:31.1	(Norway) Petter Solberg
1 (26/27 Oct)	SS8	16:32	Beraking 1	22.84	(Finland) Marcus Grönholm	13:05.7	(Norway) Petter Solberg
1 (26/27 Oct)	SS9	17:18	Flynns 1	18.78	(Finland) Marcus Grönholm	11:07.2	(Finland) Mikko Hirvonen
1 (26/27 Oct)	SS10	19:25	Perth City Super 3	2.00	(Finland) Marcus Grönholm	1:22.6	(Finland) Mikko Hirvonen
1 (26/27 Oct)	SS11	19:34	Perth City Super 4	2.00	(Spain) Xavier Pons	1:22.2	(Finland) Mikko Hirvonen
2 (28 Oct)	SS12	09:20	Bannister North 1	17.70	(Finland) Mikko Hirvonen	8:34.7	(Finland) Mikko Hirvonen
2 (28 Oct)	SS13	09:52	Bannister Central 1	17.85	(Finland) Mikko Hirvonen	9:20.8	(Finland) Mikko Hirvonen
2 (28 Oct)	SS14	10:36	Bannister Loop	3.61	(Finland) Marcus Grönholm	1:57.5	(Finland) Mikko Hirvonen
2 (28 Oct)	SS15	11:55	Bannister North 2	17.70	(Finland) Marcus Grönholm	8:30.5	(Finland) Mikko Hirvonen
2 (28 Oct)	SS16	12:27	Bannister Central 2	17.85	(Finland) Mikko Hirvonen	9:15.0	(Finland) Mikko Hirvonen
2 (28 Oct)	SS17	16:32	Beraking 2	22.84	(Norway) Petter Solberg	12:34.5	(Finland) Mikko Hirvonen
2 (28 Oct)	SS18	17:18	Flynns 2	18.78	(Finland) Marcus Grönholm	10:48.1	(Finland) Mikko Hirvonen
2 (28 Oct)	SS19	19:25	Perth City Super 5	2.00	(Finland) Marcus Grönholm	1:21.8	(Finland) Mikko Hirvonen
2 (28 Oct)	SS20	19:34	Perth City Super 6	2.00	(Finland) Marcus Grönholm	1:21.5	(Finland) Mikko Hirvonen
3 (29 Oct)	SS21	07:03	Atkins 1	4.42	(Norway) Petter Solberg	3:06.1	(Finland) Mikko Hirvonen
3 (29 Oct)	SS22	07:33	Helena North 1	29.93	(Finland) Mikko Hirvonen	17:06.0	(Finland) Mikko Hirvonen
3 (29 Oct)	SS23	08:14	Helena South 1	17.30	(Finland) Mikko Hirvonen	8:57.8	(Finland) Mikko Hirvonen
3 (29 Oct)	SS24	11:03	Atkins 2	4.42	(Norway) Petter Solberg	3:01.3	(Finland) Mikko Hirvonen
3 (29 Oct)	SS25	11:33	Helena North 2	29.93	(Norway) Petter Solberg	16:59.1	(Finland) Mikko Hirvonen
3 (29 Oct)	SS26	12:14	Helena South 2	17.30	(Norway) Petter Solberg	8:55.9	(Finland) Mikko Hirvonen
