= 2006 Tour de Corse =

Rallying motorsport event

2006 Rally Tour de Corse 50ème Tour de Corse - Rallye de France
Round 5 of the 2006 World Rally Championship
← Previous event	Next event →
- Dates run: April 7 – 9 2006
- Stages: 12 (354.10 km; 220.03 miles)
- Stage surface: Tarmac

Statistics
- Crews: 75 at start, 61 at finish

Overall results
- Overall winner: (France) Sébastien Loeb (Belgium) Kronos Total Citroën World Rally Team

The 42ème Tour de Corse - Rallye de France, the fifth round of the 2006 World Rally Championship season took place between April 7 and April 9, 2006.

== Results ==
Pos.	Driver	Co-driver	Car	Time	Difference	Points
WRC
1	(France) Sébastien Loeb	(Monaco) Daniel Elena	Citroën Xsara WRC	3:43:05.4	0.0	10
2	(Finland) Marcus Grönholm	(Finland) Timo Rautiainen	Ford Focus RS WRC 06	3:43:34.4	29.0	8
3	(Spain) Daniel Sordo	(Spain) Marc Marti	Citroën Xsara WRC	3:44:54.1	1:48.7	6
4	(Finland) Mikko Hirvonen	(Finland) Jarmo Lehtinen	Ford Focus RS WRC 06	3:45:04.6	1:59.2	5
5	(France) Alexandre Bengue	(France) Caroline Escudero	Peugeot 307 WRC	3:45:53.1	2:47.7	4
6	(Spain) Xavier Pons	(Spain) Carlos Del Barrio	Citroën Xsara WRC	3:46:15.6	3:10.2	3
7	(Austria) Manfred Stohl	(Austria) Ilka Minor	Peugeot 307 WRC	3:48:06.7	5:01.3	2
8	(France) Stéphane Sarrazin	(Belgium) Stéphane Prevot	Subaru Impreza WRC	3:48:27.3	5:21.9	1
JWRC
1	(France) Brice Tirabassi	(France) Jacques Julien Renucci	Citroën C2	4:09:21.2	0.0	10
2	(Estonia) Urmo Aava	(Estonia) Kuldar Sikk	Suzuki Swift S1600	4:11:13.6	1:52.4	8
3	(Zimbabwe) Conrad Rautenbach	(United Kingdom) David Senior	Renault Clio	4:12:14.6	2:53.4	6
4	(France) Julien Pressac	(France) Gilles De Turckheim	Citroën C2	4:12:17.6	2:56.4	5
5	(Czech Republic) Martin Prokop	(Czech Republic) Jan Tománek	Citroën C2	4:12:35.5	3:14.3	4
6	(Slovakia) Josef Beres	(Czech Republic) Petr Stary	Suzuki Ignis	4:15:38.7	6:17.5	3
7	(Turkey) Faith Kara	(Turkey) Cen Bakancocuklari	Renault Clio	4:21:06.6	11:45.4	2
8	(France) Pierre Quilici	(France) Bernard Grangie Biancamaria	Renault Clio	4:21:35.2	12:14.0	1

== Special stages ==
All dates and times are CEST (UTC+2).

Day	Stage	Time	Name	Length	Winner	Time	Rally leader
1 (7 APR)	SS1	09:38	Ampaza - Col St Eustache 1	32.88 km	(France) Sébastien Loeb	20:45.5	(France) Sébastien Loeb
1 (7 APR)	SS2	10:31	Aullene - Arbellara 1	27.78 km	(Finland) Marcus Grönholm	15:49.8	(France) Sébastien Loeb
1 (7 APR)	SS3	14:34	Ampaza - Col St Eustache 2	32.88 km	(France) Sébastien Loeb	20:48.8	(France) Sébastien Loeb
1 (7 APR)	SS4	15:27	Aullene - Arbellara 2	27.78 km	(France) Sébastien Loeb	15:51.4	(France) Sébastien Loeb
2 (8 APR)	SS5	09:53	Vico - Plague Du Liamone 1	34.16 km	(France) Sébastien Loeb	24:05.6	(France) Sébastien Loeb
2 (8 APR)	SS6	11:31	Ucciani - Bastellica 1	26.2 km	(Finland) Mikko Hirvonen	16:56.9	(France) Sébastien Loeb
2 (8 APR)	SS7	14:54	Vico - Plague Du Liamone 2	34.16 km	(France) Sébastien Loeb	24:03.6	(France) Sébastien Loeb
2 (8 APR)	SS8	16:32	Ucciani - Bastellica 2	26.2 km	(Spain) Dani Sordo	16:56.8	(France) Sébastien Loeb
3 (9 APR)	SS9	08:08	Penitencier Coti Chiavari 1	24.23 km	(France) Sébastien Loeb	14:43.0	(France) Sébastien Loeb
3 (9 APR)	SS10	08:51	Pont De Calzola - Agosta 1	31.8 km	(Spain) Dani Sordo	18:57.7	(France) Sébastien Loeb
3 (9 APR)	SS11	11:34	Penitencier Xoti Chiavari 2	24.23 km	(Finland) Marcus Grönholm	14:44.7	(France) Sébastien Loeb
3 (9 APR)	SS12	12:17	Pont De Calzola - Agosta 2	31.8 km	(Finland) Marcus Grönholm	18:57.0	(France) Sébastien Loeb
