= Alexandre Bengué =

French rally driver (born 1975)

Personal information
- Nationality: (France) French
- Born: 22 December 1975 (age 50); Lourdes

World Rally Championship record
- Years active: 1999 – 2006
- Co-driver: (France) Jean-Claude Grau (France) Caroline Escudero
- Teams: Škoda Motorsport
- Rallies: 14
- Championships: 0
- Rally wins: 0
- Podiums: 0
- Stage wins: 2
- Total points: 12
- First rally: 1999 Tour de Corse
- Last rally: 2006 Tour de Corse

Alexandre Bengué (born 22 December 1975, in Lourdes) is a French rally driver. Bengué was a factory driver for Škoda Motorsport in the World Rally Championship in 2005, before scoring two points finishes as a privateer in 2006.

== Career ==
Bengué began his rally career in 1998, when he won the Volant Rally Jeunes competition organised by the Fédération Française du Sport Automobile (FFSA). In 2002 he began competing in the French Rally Championship in a Peugeot 206 WRC, winning one round. In the following year he won four rounds on the way to being crowned French Asphalt Rally Champion. He also took part in the Tour de Corse in a Peugeot 206 WRC, but was forced to retire with a mechanical issue.

In 2004, Bengué again won four French championship rounds, but missed out on the title finishing second. He took part in two WRC rounds, finishing tenth on Rallye Deutschland but again having to retire while running eighth overall. In November, he was announced as a driver for the factory Škoda Motorsport team for the 2005 season. He would driving the team's second car on asphalt events.

Bengué finished ninth on his debut with the team on the Monte Carlo Rally, taking two stage victories on the second day. His next outing for the team came in Germany, but he retired after going off the road on the third stage. His third start for the team was on his home round in Corsica, where he finished in sixth place, matching the best ever result for the Škoda Fabia WRC. His fourth and final rally for the team was on Rally Catalunya, but he was forced to retire. Škoda Motorsport withdrew from the WRC at the end of 2005.

For 2006, Bengué entered the Catalunya and Corsica rounds in a Peugeot 307 WRC for the BSA team. He finished fourth overall in Spain, and then finished fifth in France.

In 2008, Bengué returned to the French championship and won two rounds in a 307 WRC.

In 2010, Bengué was announced to be part of a five-round Intercontinental Rally Challenge programme with British firm Motor Sports Developments and tyre firm Hankook in an Opel Corsa OPC Super 2000. They were forced to retire from their first rally in Ypres on the first stage due to engine damage. Bengué never competed in the car again.

== Complete World Rally Championship results ==
Year	Entrant	Car	1	2	3	4	5	6	7	8	9	10	11	12	13	14	15	16	WDC	Points
1999	Alexandre Bengué	Peugeot 106 S16	MON	SWE	KEN	POR	ESP	FRA; Ret	ARG	GRE	NZL	FIN	CHN	ITA	AUS	GBR			NC	0
2000	Alexandre Bengué	Peugeot 106 S16	MON	SWE	KEN	POR	ESP	ARG	GRE	NZL	FIN	CYP	FRA; Ret	ITA	AUS	GBR			NC	0
2001	Alexandre Bengué	Peugeot 206 S16	MON; Ret	SWE	POR	ESP	ARG	CYP	GRE	KEN	FIN	NZL	ITA	FRA	AUS	GBR			NC	0
2003	Alexandre Bengué	Peugeot 206 WRC	MON	SWE	TUR	NZL	ARG	GRE	CYP	GER	FIN	AUS	ITA	FRA; Ret	ESP	GBR			NC	0
2004	Alexandre Bengué	Peugeot 206 WRC	MON; Ret	SWE	MEX	NZL	CYP	GRE	TUR	ARG									NC	0
2004	Alexandre Bengué	Peugeot 206 XS									FIN; 19								NC	0
2004	Equipe de France FFSA	Peugeot 206 WRC										GER; 10	JPN	GBR	ITA	FRA; Ret	ESP	AUS	NC	0
2005	Škoda Motorsport	Škoda Fabia WRC	MON; 9	SWE	MEX	NZL	ITA	CYP	TUR	GRE	ARG	FIN	GER; Ret	GBR	JPN	FRA; 6	ESP; Ret	AUS	21st	3
2006	Alexandre Bengué	Peugeot 307 WRC	MON	SWE	MEX	ESP; 4	FRA; 5	ARG	ITA	GRE	GER	FIN	JPN	CYP	TUR	AUS	NZL	GBR	12th	9
