= FFSA =

FFSA may refer to:

- Football Federation South Australia
- Fédération Française du Sport Automobile
