= 2004 Rallye Deutschland =

10th round of the 2004 World Rally Championship

2004 Rallye Deutschland: 23. OMV ADAC Rallye Deutschland
Round 10 of the 2004 World Rally Championship season
← Previous event	Next event →
- Host country: Germany
- Rally base: Trier
- Dates run: August 20, 2004 – August 22, 2004
- Stages: 24 (411.06 km; 255.42 miles)
- Stage surface: Tarmac
- Overall distance: 1,018.36 km (632.78 miles)

Statistics
- Crews: 69 at start, 41 at finish

Overall results
- Overall winner: (France) Sébastien Loeb (Monaco) Daniel Elena (France) Citroën Total; Citroën Xsara WRC

The 2004 Rallye Deutschland (formally the 23. OMV ADAC Rallye Deutschland) was the tenth round of the 2004 World Rally Championship season. The race was held over three days between 20 August and 22 August 2004, and was based in Trier, Germany. Citroën's Sébastien Loeb won the race, his 9th win in the World Rally Championship.

== Background ==
=== Entry list ===
No.	Driver	Co-Driver	Entrant	Car	Tyre
World Rally Championship manufacturer entries
1	(Norway) Petter Solberg	(United Kingdom) Phil Mills	(Japan) 555 Subaru World Rally Team	Subaru Impreza S10 WRC '04	P
2	(Finland) Mikko Hirvonen	(Finland) Jarmo Lehtinen	(Japan) 555 Subaru World Rally Team	Subaru Impreza S10 WRC '04	P
3	(France) Sébastien Loeb	(Monaco) Daniel Elena	(France) Citroën Total WRT	Citroën Xsara WRC	MI
4	(Spain) Carlos Sainz	(Spain) Marc Martí	(France) Citroën Total WRT	Citroën Xsara WRC	MI
5	(Finland) Marcus Grönholm	(Finland) Timo Rautiainen	(France) Marlboro Peugeot Total	Peugeot 307 WRC	MI
6	(France) Cédric Robert	(France) Gérald Bedon	(France) Marlboro Peugeot Total	Peugeot 307 WRC	MI
7	(Estonia) Markko Märtin	(United Kingdom) Michael Park	(United Kingdom) Ford Motor Co. Ltd.	Ford Focus RS WRC '04	MI
8	(Belgium) François Duval	(Belgium) Stéphane Prévot	(United Kingdom) Ford Motor Co. Ltd.	Ford Focus RS WRC '04	MI
9	(France) Gilles Panizzi	(France) Hervé Panizzi	(Japan) Mitsubishi Motors	Mitsubishi Lancer WRC 04	MI
10	(Spain) Daniel Solà	(Spain) Xavier Amigò	(Japan) Mitsubishi Motors	Mitsubishi Lancer WRC 04	MI
World Rally Championship entries
11	(Germany) Armin Schwarz	(Germany) Manfred Hiemer	(Czech Republic) Škoda Motorsport	Škoda Fabia WRC	MI
12	(Finland) Toni Gardemeister	(Finland) Paavo Lukander	(Czech Republic) Škoda Motorsport	Škoda Fabia WRC	MI
14	(Sweden) Daniel Carlsson	(Sweden) Matthias Andersson	(France) Bozian Racing	Peugeot 206 WRC	MI
15	(Germany) Antony Warmbold	(United Kingdom) Gemma Price	(Germany) Antony Warmbold	Ford Focus RS WRC '02	MI
16	(Belgium) Freddy Loix	(Belgium) Sven Smeets	(France) Marlboro Peugeot Total	Peugeot 307 WRC	MI
17	(Czech Republic) Roman Kresta	(Czech Republic) Jan Tománek	(Czech Republic) Škoda Motorsport	Škoda Fabia WRC	MI
18	(Germany) Armin Kremer	(Germany) Fred Berssen	(Germany) Armin Kremer	Toyota Corolla WRC	MI
19	(Finland) Jussi Välimäki	(Finland) Jakke Honkanen	(Finland) Jussi Välimäki	Ford Focus RS WRC '03	MI
20	(Sweden) Nicolas Vouilloz	(Sweden) Denis Giraudet	(France) Bozian Racing	Peugeot 206 WRC	MI
21	(France) Stéphane Sarrazin	(France) Patrick Pivato	Equipe de France FFSA	Subaru Impreza S9 WRC '03	MI
22	(France) Alexandre Bengué	(France) Caroline Escudero-Bengué	Equipe de France FFSA	Peugeot 206 WRC	MI
23	(Belgium) Pieter Tsjoen	(Belgium) Eddy Chevaillier	(Belgium) Pieter Tsjoen	Toyota Corolla WRC	MI
24	(United Kingdom) Ginley Alistair	(Republic of Ireland) Rory Kennedy	(United Kingdom) Ginley Alistair	Subaru Impreza S9 WRC '03	P
PWRC entries
31	(Japan) Toshihiro Arai	(New Zealand) Tony Sircombe	(Japan) Subaru Team Arai	Subaru Impreza WRX STI	P
32	(Malaysia) Karamjit Singh	(Malaysia) Allen Oh	Proton Pert Malaysia	Proton Pert	P
34	(United Kingdom) Niall McShea	(United Kingdom) Gordon Noble	(United Kingdom) Niall McShea	Subaru Impreza STI	—N/a
36	(Mexico) Ricardo Triviño	(Spain) Jordi Barrabés	(Mexico) Triviño Racing	Mitsubishi Lancer Evo VIII	—N/a
37	(Sweden) Joakim Roman	(Sweden) Anders Wallbom	(Sweden) Joakim Roman	Subaru Impreza STI	MI
38	(Bulgaria) Georgi Geradzhiev Jr.	(Bulgaria) Nikola Popov	(Bulgaria) Racing Team Bulgartabac	Mitsubishi Lancer Evo VII	—N/a
39	(United Kingdom) Alister McRae	(United Kingdom) David Senior	(United Kingdom) R.E.D World Rally Team	Subaru Impreza STI N10	P
40	(Austria) Manfred Stohl	(Austria) Ilka Minor	(Austria) OMV World Rally Team	Mitsubishi Lancer Evo VII	P
41	(Finland) Jani Paasonen	(Finland) Jani Vainikka	(Austria) OMV World Rally Team	Mitsubishi Lancer Evo VII	P
43	(Italy) Gianluigi Galli	(Italy) Guido D'Amore	(Italy) Gianluigi Galli	Mitsubishi Lancer Evo VIII	P
45	(Italy) Fabio Frisiero	(Italy) Giovanni Agnese	(Italy) Fabio Frisiero	Subaru Impreza WRX STI	—N/a
47	(Spain) Xavier Pons	(Spain) Oriol Julià	(Spain) Xavier Pons	Mitsubishi Lancer Evo VIII	MI
48	(Japan) Fumio Nutahara	(Japan) Satoshi Hayashi	(Japan) Advan-Piaa Rally Team	Mitsubishi Lancer Evo VIII	Y
49	(Spain) Sergio López-Fombona	(Spain) Guifré Pujol	Ralliart Spain	Mitsubishi Lancer Evo VIII	—N/a
50	(Germany) Sebastian Vollak	(Germany) Michael Kölbach	(Austria) OMV World Rally Team	Mitsubishi Lancer Evo VII	P

=== Itinerary ===
All dates and times are CEST (UTC+2).

Date	Time	No.	Stage name	Distance
Leg 1 — 135.02 km
20 August	09:53	SS1	Ruwertal 1	17.84 km
20 August	10:33	SS2	Dhrontal 1	21.04 km
20 August	11:16	SS3	Moselwein 1	18.18 km
20 August	12:29	SS4	Peterberg 1	10.45 km
20 August	14:50	SS5	Ruwertal 2	17.84 km
20 August	15:30	SS6	Dhrontal 2	21.04 km
20 August	16:13	SS7	Moselwein 2	18.18 km
20 August	17:26	SS8	Peterberg 2	10.45 km
Leg 2 — 177.66 km
21 August	09:33	SS9	Bosenberg 1	17.11 km
21 August	10:33	SS10	Erzweiler 1	20.00 km
21 August	11:08	SS11	Panzerplatte Sprint 1	8.30 km
21 August	11:46	SS12	Panzerplatte Lang 1	40.30 km
21 August	14:32	SS13	Bosenberg 2	17.11 km
21 August	15:32	SS14	Erzweiler 2	20.00 km
21 August	16:07	SS15	Panzerplatte Sprint 2	8.30 km
21 August	16:45	SS16	Panzerplatte Lang 2	40.30 km
21 August	19:36	SS17	St. Wendel 1	6.24 km
Leg 3 — 98.38 km
22 August	07:20	SS18	St. Wendeler Land 1	14.80 km
22 August	07:49	SS19	Teufelskopf 1	17.53 km
22 August	08:30	SS20	Birkenfelder Land 1	13.74 km
22 August	09:54	SS21	St. Wendeler Land 2	14.80 km
22 August	10:23	SS22	Teufelskopf 2	17.53 km
22 August	11:04	SS23	Birkenfelder Land 2	13.74 km
22 August	12:02	SS24	St. Wendel 2	6.24 km

== Results ==
=== Overall ===
Pos.	No.	Driver	Co-driver	Team	Car	Time	Difference	Points
1	3	(France) Sébastien Loeb	(Monaco) Daniel Elena	(France) Citroën Total WRT	Citroën Xsara WRC	4:01:57.4		10
2	8	(Belgium) François Duval	(Belgium) Stéphane Prévot	(United Kingdom) Ford Motor Co. Ltd.	Ford Focus RS WRC '04	4:02:26.5	+29.1	8
3	4	(Spain) Carlos Sainz	(Spain) Marc Martí	(France) Citroën Total WRT	Citroën Xsara WRC	4:03:06.9	+1:09.5	6
4	7	(Estonia) Markko Märtin	(United Kingdom) Michael Park	(United Kingdom) Ford Motor Co. Ltd.	Ford Focus RS WRC '04	4:04:37.8	+2:40.4	5
5	6	(France) Cédric Robert	(France) Gérald Bedon	(France) Marlboro Peugeot Total	Peugeot 307 WRC	4:05:27.5	+3:30.1	4
6	16	(Belgium) Freddy Loix	(Belgium) Sven Smeets	(France) Marlboro Peugeot Total	Peugeot 307 WRC	4:06:03.4	+4:06.0	3
7	12	(Finland) Toni Gardemeister	(Finland) Paavo Lukander	(Czech Republic) Škoda Motorsport	Škoda Fabia WRC	4:07:41.6	+5:44.2	2
8	2	(Finland) Mikko Hirvonen	(Finland) Jarmo Lehtinen	(Japan) 555 Subaru World Rally Team	Subaru Impreza S10 WRC '04	4:08:38.5	+6:41.1	1

=== World Rally Cars ===
==== Classification ====
Position		No.	Driver	Co-driver	Entrant	Car	Time	Difference	Points
Event	Class	No.	Driver	Co-driver	Entrant	Car	Time	Difference	Points
1	1	3	(France) Sébastien Loeb	(Monaco) Daniel Elena	(France) Citroën Total WRT	Citroën Xsara WRC	4:01:57.4		10
2	2	8	(Belgium) François Duval	(Belgium) Stéphane Prévot	(United Kingdom) Ford Motor Co. Ltd.	Ford Focus RS WRC '04	4:02:26.5	+29.1	8
3	3	4	(Spain) Carlos Sainz	(Spain) Marc Martí	(France) Citroën Total WRT	Citroën Xsara WRC	4:03:06.9	+1:09.5	6
4	4	7	(Estonia) Markko Märtin	(United Kingdom) Michael Park	(United Kingdom) Ford Motor Co. Ltd.	Ford Focus RS WRC '04	4:04:37.8	+2:40.4	5
5	5	6	(France) Cédric Robert	(France) Gérald Bedon	(France) Marlboro Peugeot Total	Peugeot 307 WRC	4:05:27.5	+3:30.1	4
8	6	2	(Finland) Mikko Hirvonen	(Finland) Jarmo Lehtinen	(Japan) 555 Subaru World Rally Team	Subaru Impreza S10 WRC '04	4:08:38.5	+6:41.1	1
Retired SS12		1	(Norway) Petter Solberg	(United Kingdom) Phil Mills	(Japan) 555 Subaru World Rally Team	Subaru Impreza S10 WRC '04	Accident		0
Retired SS9		9	(France) Gilles Panizzi	(France) Hervé Panizzi	(Japan) Mitsubishi Motors	Mitsubishi Lancer WRC 04	Accident		0
Retired SS2		10	(Spain) Daniel Solà	(Spain) Xavier Amigò	(Japan) Mitsubishi Motors	Mitsubishi Lancer WRC 04	Accident		0
Retired SS1		5	(Finland) Marcus Grönholm	(Finland) Timo Rautiainen	(France) Marlboro Peugeot Total	Peugeot 307 WRC	Accident		0

==== Special stages ====
Day	Stage	Stage name	Length	Winner	Car	Time	Class leaders
Leg 1 (20 Aug)	SS1	Ruwertal 1	17.84 km	(Spain) Carlos Sainz	Citroën Xsara WRC	10:51.7	(Spain) Carlos Sainz
Leg 1 (20 Aug)	SS2	Dhrontal 1	21.04 km	(Belgium) François Duval	Ford Focus RS WRC '04	11:57.7	(France) Sébastien Loeb
Leg 1 (20 Aug)	SS3	Moselwein 1	18.18 km	(Belgium) François Duval	Ford Focus RS WRC '04	10:42.3	(France) Sébastien Loeb
Leg 1 (20 Aug)	SS4	Peterberg 1	10.45 km	(France) Sébastien Loeb	Citroën Xsara WRC	5:58.6	(France) Sébastien Loeb
Leg 1 (20 Aug)	SS5	Ruwertal 2	17.84 km	(France) Sébastien Loeb	Citroën Xsara WRC	10:15.1	(France) Sébastien Loeb
Leg 1 (20 Aug)	SS6	Dhrontal 2	21.04 km	(France) Sébastien Loeb	Citroën Xsara WRC	11:37.8	(France) Sébastien Loeb
Leg 1 (20 Aug)	SS7	Moselwein 2	18.18 km	(France) Sébastien Loeb	Citroën Xsara WRC	10:41.3	(France) Sébastien Loeb
Leg 1 (20 Aug)	SS8	Peterberg 2	10.45 km	(France) Sébastien Loeb	Citroën Xsara WRC	5:55.4	(France) Sébastien Loeb
Leg 2 (21 Aug)	SS9	Bosenberg 1	17.11 km	Notional stage time			(France) Sébastien Loeb
Leg 2 (21 Aug)	SS10	Erzweiler 1	20.00 km	(Belgium) François Duval	Ford Focus RS WRC '04	12:13.4	(France) Sébastien Loeb
Leg 2 (21 Aug)	SS11	Panzerplatte Sprint 1	8.30 km	(Estonia) Markko Märtin	Ford Focus RS WRC '04	4:46.6	(France) Sébastien Loeb
Leg 2 (21 Aug)	SS12	Panzerplatte Lang 1	40.30 km	Notional stage time			(France) Sébastien Loeb
Leg 2 (21 Aug)	SS13	Bosenberg 2	17.11 km	(Germany) Armin Schwarz	Škoda Fabia WRC	9:36.6	(France) Sébastien Loeb
Leg 2 (21 Aug)	SS14	Erzweiler 2	20.00 km	(France) Sébastien Loeb	Citroën Xsara WRC	12:15.3	(France) Sébastien Loeb
Leg 2 (21 Aug)	SS15	Panzerplatte Sprint 2	8.30 km	(Belgium) Freddy Loix	Peugeot 307 WRC	4:45.6	(France) Sébastien Loeb
Leg 2 (21 Aug)	SS16	Panzerplatte Lang 2	40.30 km	(France) Sébastien Loeb	Citroën Xsara WRC	24:22.8	(France) Sébastien Loeb
Leg 2 (21 Aug)	SS17	St. Wendel 1	6.24 km	(France) Cédric Robert	Peugeot 307 WRC	3:29.2	(France) Sébastien Loeb
Leg 3 (22 Aug)	SS18	St. Wendeler Land 1	14.80 km	(Belgium) Freddy Loix	Peugeot 307 WRC	7:46.3	(France) Sébastien Loeb
Leg 3 (22 Aug)	SS19	Teufelskopf 1	17.53 km	(Belgium) François Duval	Ford Focus RS WRC '04	11:08.0	(France) Sébastien Loeb
Leg 3 (22 Aug)	SS20	Birkenfelder Land 1	13.74 km	(France) Cédric Robert	Peugeot 307 WRC	8:04.8	(France) Sébastien Loeb
Leg 3 (22 Aug)	SS21	St. Wendeler Land 2	14.80 km	(Belgium) François Duval	Ford Focus RS WRC '04	7:39.9	(France) Sébastien Loeb
Leg 3 (22 Aug)	SS22	Teufelskopf 2	17.53 km	(Belgium) François Duval	Ford Focus RS WRC '04	10:56.8	(France) Sébastien Loeb
Leg 3 (22 Aug)	SS23	Birkenfelder Land 2	13.74 km	(Finland) Marcus Grönholm	Peugeot 307 WRC	8:00.2	(France) Sébastien Loeb
Leg 3 (22 Aug)	SS24	St. Wendel 2	6.24 km	(Finland) Marcus Grönholm	Peugeot 307 WRC	3:22.4	(France) Sébastien Loeb

==== Championship standings ====
Pos.	Drivers' championships			Co-drivers' championships			Manufacturers' championships		
Pos.	Move	Driver	Points	Move	Co-driver	Points	Move	Manufacturer	Points
1		(France) Sébastien Loeb	76		(Monaco) Daniel Elena	76		(France) Citroën Total WRT	125
2	1	(Estonia) Markko Märtin	47	1	(United Kingdom) Michael Park	47		(United Kingdom) Ford Motor Co. Ltd.	96
3	2	(Spain) Carlos Sainz	46	2	(Spain) Marc Martí	46		(Japan) 555 Subaru World Rally Team	67
4	2	(Norway) Petter Solberg	44	2	(United Kingdom) Phil Mills	44		(France) Marlboro Peugeot Total	65
5	1	(Finland) Marcus Grönholm	42	1	(Finland) Timo Rautiainen	42		(Japan) Mitsubishi Motors	17

=== Production World Rally Championship ===
==== Classification ====
Position		No.	Driver	Co-driver	Entrant	Car	Time	Difference	Points
Event	Class	No.	Driver	Co-driver	Entrant	Car	Time	Difference	Points
15	1	47	(Spain) Xavier Pons	(Spain) Oriol Julià	(Spain) Xavier Pons	Mitsubishi Lancer Evo VIII	4:24:11.4		10
16	2	34	(United Kingdom) Niall McShea	(United Kingdom) Gordon Noble	(United Kingdom) Niall McShea	Subaru Impreza STI	4:24:41.8	+30.4	8
17	3	39	(United Kingdom) Alister McRae	(United Kingdom) David Senior	(United Kingdom) R.E.D World Rally Team	Subaru Impreza STI N10	4:25:57.0	+1:45.6	6
18	4	31	(Japan) Toshihiro Arai	(New Zealand) Tony Sircombe	(Japan) Subaru Team Arai	Subaru Impreza WRX STI	4:26:03.4	+1:52.0	5
20	5	41	(Finland) Jani Paasonen	(Finland) Jani Vainikka	(Austria) OMV World Rally Team	Mitsubishi Lancer Evo VII	4:28:29.3	+4:17.9	4
22	6	32	(Malaysia) Karamjit Singh	(Malaysia) Allen Oh	Proton Pert Malaysia	Proton Pert	4:30:34.6	+6:23.2	3
25	7	50	(Germany) Sebastian Vollak	(Germany) Michael Kölbach	(Austria) OMV World Rally Team	Mitsubishi Lancer Evo VII	4:34:22.3	+10:10.9	2
29	8	38	(Bulgaria) Georgi Geradzhiev Jr.	(Bulgaria) Nikola Popov	(Bulgaria) Racing Team Bulgartabac	Mitsubishi Lancer Evo VII	4:45:47.9	+21:36.5	1
31	9	36	(Mexico) Ricardo Triviño	(Spain) Jordi Barrabés	(Mexico) Triviño Racing	Mitsubishi Lancer Evo VIII	4:50:28.5	+26:17.1	0
32	10	40	(Austria) Manfred Stohl	(Austria) Ilka Minor	(Austria) OMV World Rally Team	Mitsubishi Lancer Evo VII	4:52:16.7	+28:05.3	0
Retired SS20		45	(Italy) Fabio Frisiero	(Italy) Giovanni Agnese	(Italy) Fabio Frisiero	Subaru Impreza WRX STI	Gearbox		0
Retired SS16		43	(Italy) Gianluigi Galli	(Italy) Guido D'Amore	(Italy) Gianluigi Galli	Mitsubishi Lancer Evo VIII	Accident		0
Retired SS4		37	(Sweden) Joakim Roman	(Sweden) Anders Wallbom	(Sweden) Joakim Roman	Subaru Impreza STI	Gearbox		0
Retired SS3		48	(Japan) Fumio Nutahara	(Japan) Satoshi Hayashi	(Japan) Advan-Piaa Rally Team	Mitsubishi Lancer Evo VIII	Gearbox		0
Retired SS3		49	(Spain) Sergio López-Fombona	(Spain) Guifré Pujol	Ralliart Spain	Mitsubishi Lancer Evo VIII	Gearbox		0

==== Special stages ====
Day	Stage	Stage name	Length	Winner	Car	Time	Class leaders
Leg 1 (20 Aug)	SS1	Ruwertal 1	17.84 km	(Italy) Gianluigi Galli	Mitsubishi Lancer Evo VIII	11:52.2	(Italy) Gianluigi Galli
Leg 1 (20 Aug)	SS2	Dhrontal 1	21.04 km	(Spain) Xavier Pons	Mitsubishi Lancer Evo VIII	13:20.8	(Italy) Gianluigi Galli
Leg 1 (20 Aug)	SS3	Moselwein 1	18.18 km	(Spain) Xavier Pons	Mitsubishi Lancer Evo VIII	12:04.4	(Italy) Gianluigi Galli
Leg 1 (20 Aug)	SS4	Peterberg 1	10.45 km	(Italy) Gianluigi Galli	Mitsubishi Lancer Evo VIII	6:36.3	(Italy) Gianluigi Galli
Leg 1 (20 Aug)	SS5	Ruwertal 2	17.84 km	(Italy) Gianluigi Galli	Mitsubishi Lancer Evo VIII	11:10.4	(Italy) Gianluigi Galli
Leg 1 (20 Aug)	SS6	Dhrontal 2	21.04 km	(Spain) Xavier Pons	Mitsubishi Lancer Evo VIII	12:59.4	(Spain) Xavier Pons
Leg 1 (20 Aug)	SS7	Moselwein 2	18.18 km	(Italy) Gianluigi Galli	Mitsubishi Lancer Evo VIII	11:49.8	(Spain) Xavier Pons
Leg 1 (20 Aug)	SS8	Peterberg 2	10.45 km	(Italy) Gianluigi Galli	Mitsubishi Lancer Evo VIII	6:33.5	(Spain) Xavier Pons
Leg 2 (21 Aug)	SS9	Bosenberg 1	17.11 km	Notional stage time			(Spain) Xavier Pons
Leg 2 (21 Aug)	SS10	Erzweiler 1	20.00 km	(Spain) Xavier Pons	Mitsubishi Lancer Evo VIII	13:13.6	(Spain) Xavier Pons
Leg 2 (21 Aug)	SS11	Panzerplatte Sprint 1	8.30 km	(Italy) Gianluigi Galli	Mitsubishi Lancer Evo VIII	5:13.0	(Spain) Xavier Pons
Leg 2 (21 Aug)	SS12	Panzerplatte Lang 1	40.30 km	Notional stage time			(Spain) Xavier Pons
Leg 2 (21 Aug)	SS13	Bosenberg 2	17.11 km	(Italy) Gianluigi Galli	Mitsubishi Lancer Evo VIII	10:38.3	(Italy) Gianluigi Galli
Leg 2 (21 Aug)	SS14	Erzweiler 2	20.00 km	(Spain) Xavier Pons	Mitsubishi Lancer Evo VIII	13:04.4	(Italy) Gianluigi Galli
Leg 2 (21 Aug)	SS15	Panzerplatte Sprint 2	8.30 km	(United Kingdom) Niall McShea	Subaru Impreza WRX STI	5:17.4	(Italy) Gianluigi Galli
Leg 2 (21 Aug)	SS16	Panzerplatte Lang 2	40.30 km	(United Kingdom) Niall McShea	Subaru Impreza WRX STI	26:20.4	(Spain) Xavier Pons
Leg 2 (21 Aug)	SS17	St. Wendel 1	6.24 km	(Japan) Toshihiro Arai	Subaru Impreza WRX STI	3:53.0	(Spain) Xavier Pons
Leg 3 (22 Aug)	SS18	St. Wendeler Land 1	14.80 km	(Spain) Xavier Pons	Mitsubishi Lancer Evo VIII	8:31.4	(Spain) Xavier Pons
Leg 3 (22 Aug)	SS19	Teufelskopf 1	17.53 km	(Spain) Xavier Pons	Mitsubishi Lancer Evo VIII	12:10.6	(Spain) Xavier Pons
Leg 3 (22 Aug)	SS20	Birkenfelder Land 1	13.74 km	(Spain) Xavier Pons	Mitsubishi Lancer Evo VIII	8:55.4	(Spain) Xavier Pons
Leg 3 (22 Aug)	SS21	St. Wendeler Land 2	14.80 km	(United Kingdom) Niall McShea	Subaru Impreza WRX STI	8:26.2	(Spain) Xavier Pons
Leg 3 (22 Aug)	SS22	Teufelskopf 2	17.53 km	(United Kingdom) Niall McShea	Subaru Impreza WRX STI	11:54.3	(Spain) Xavier Pons
Leg 3 (22 Aug)	SS23	Birkenfelder Land 2	13.74 km	(United Kingdom) Alister McRae	Subaru Impreza STI N10	8:40.2	(Spain) Xavier Pons
Leg 3 (22 Aug)	SS24	St. Wendel 2	6.24 km	(Spain) Xavier Pons	Mitsubishi Lancer Evo VIII	3:46.6	(Spain) Xavier Pons

==== Championship standings ====
Pos.	Drivers' championships		
Pos.	Move	Driver	Points
1		(Finland) Jani Paasonen	29
2	3	(United Kingdom) Alister McRae	20
3	1	(Japan) Toshihiro Arai	20
4	2	(United Kingdom) Niall McShea	19
5	3	(Austria) Manfred Stohl	18
