= 2004 Tour de Corse =

14th round of the 2004 World Rally Championship

2004 Tour de Corse 48th Tour de Corse - Rallye de France
Round 14 of the 2004 World Rally Championship season
← Previous event	Next event →
- Host country: France
- Rally base: Ajaccio
- Dates run: October 15, 2004 – October 17, 2004
- Stages: 12 (387.80 km; 240.97 miles)
- Stage surface: Asphalt
- Overall distance: 1,060.72 km (659.10 miles)

Statistics
- Crews: 53 at start, 35 at finish

Overall results
- Overall winner: (Estonia) Markko Märtin (United Kingdom) Michael Park (United Kingdom) Ford Motor Co. Ltd. Ford Focus RS WRC '04

The 2004 Tour de Corse (formally the 48. Tour de Corse - Rallye de France) was the fourteenth round of the 2004 World Rally Championship season. The race was held over three days between 15 October and 17 October 2004, and was based in Ajaccio, France. Ford's Markko Märtin won the race, his 4th win in the World Rally Championship.

== Background ==
=== Entry list ===
No.	Driver	Co-Driver	Entrant	Car	Tyre
World Rally Championship manufacturer entries
1	(Norway) Petter Solberg	(United Kingdom) Phil Mills	(Japan) 555 Subaru World Rally Team	Subaru Impreza S10 WRC '04	P
2	(Finland) Mikko Hirvonen	(Finland) Jarmo Lehtinen	(Japan) 555 Subaru World Rally Team	Subaru Impreza S10 WRC '04	P
3	(France) Sébastien Loeb	(Monaco) Daniel Elena	(France) Citroën Total WRT	Citroën Xsara WRC	MI
4	(Spain) Carlos Sainz	(Spain) Marc Martí	(France) Citroën Total WRT	Citroën Xsara WRC	MI
5	(Finland) Marcus Grönholm	(Finland) Timo Rautiainen	(France) Marlboro Peugeot Total	Peugeot 307 WRC	MI
6	(France) Cédric Robert	(France) Gérald Bedon	(France) Marlboro Peugeot Total	Peugeot 307 WRC	MI
7	(Estonia) Markko Märtin	(United Kingdom) Michael Park	(United Kingdom) Ford Motor Co. Ltd.	Ford Focus RS WRC '04	MI
8	(Belgium) François Duval	(Belgium) Stéphane Prévot	(United Kingdom) Ford Motor Co. Ltd.	Ford Focus RS WRC '04	MI
World Rally Championship entries
9	(Belgium) Freddy Loix	(Belgium) Sven Smeets	(France) Marlboro Peugeot Total	Peugeot 307 WRC	MI
11	(Finland) Toni Gardemeister	(Finland) Paavo Lukander	(Czech Republic) Škoda Motorsport	Škoda Fabia WRC	MI
12	(Germany) Armin Schwarz	(Germany) Manfred Hiemer	(Czech Republic) Škoda Motorsport	Škoda Fabia WRC	MI
20	(Sweden) Daniel Carlsson	(Sweden) Matthias Andersson	(France) Bozian Racing	Peugeot 206 WRC	MI
21	(Sweden) Nicolas Vouilloz	(Sweden) Denis Giraudet	(France) Bozian Racing	Peugeot 206 WRC	MI
22	(France) Stéphane Sarrazin	(France) Patrick Pivato	Equipe de France FFSA	Subaru Impreza S9 WRC '03	MI
23	(France) Alexandre Bengué	(France) Caroline Escudero-Bengué	Equipe de France FFSA	Peugeot 206 WRC	MI
24	(Germany) Antony Warmbold	(United Kingdom) Gemma Price	(Germany) Antony Warmbold	Ford Focus RS WRC '02	MI
64	(France) Alain Vauthier	(France) François Ravault	(France) Alain Vauthier	Subaru Impreza S7 WRC '01	—N/a
68	(France) José Micheli	(France) Marie-Josée Cardi	(France) José Micheli	Toyota Corolla WRC	—N/a
PWRC entries
33	(Spain) Daniel Solà	(Spain) Xavier Amigò	(Spain) Daniel Solà	Mitsubishi Lancer Evo VII	P
34	(United Kingdom) Niall McShea	(United Kingdom) Gordon Noble	(United Kingdom) Niall McShea	Subaru Impreza STI N10	—N/a
35	(Argentina) Marcos Ligato	(Argentina) Diego Curletto	(Argentina) Marcos Ligato	Subaru Impreza STI N10	—N/a
36	(Mexico) Ricardo Triviño	(Spain) Jordi Barrabés	(Mexico) Triviño Racing	Mitsubishi Lancer Evo VIII	—N/a
37	(Sweden) Joakim Roman	(Sweden) Anders Wallbom	(Sweden) Joakim Roman	Subaru Impreza STI	MI
38	(Bulgaria) Georgi Geradzhiev Jr.	(Bulgaria) Nikola Popov	(Bulgaria) Racing Team Bulgartabac	Mitsubishi Lancer Evo VII	—N/a
39	(United Kingdom) Alister McRae	(United Kingdom) David Senior	(United Kingdom) R.E.D World Rally Team	Subaru Impreza STI N10	P
42	(United Kingdom) Mark Higgins	(United Kingdom) Michael Gibson	(United Kingdom) Mark Higgins	Subaru Impreza STI	—N/a
43	(Italy) Gianluigi Galli	(Italy) Guido D'Amore	(Italy) Gianluigi Galli	Mitsubishi Lancer Evo VII	P
44	(Qatar) Nasser Al-Attiyah	(United Kingdom) Chris Patterson	(Qatar) Nasser Al-Attiyah	Subaru Impreza STI N10	—N/a
45	(Italy) Fabio Frisiero	(Italy) Giovanni Agnese	(Italy) Fabio Frisiero	Subaru Impreza WRX STI	—N/a
46	(Poland) Tomasz Kuchar	(Poland) Jakub Gerber	(Poland) Tomasz Kuchar	Mitsubishi Lancer Evo VII	MI
47	(Spain) Xavier Pons	(Spain) Oriol Julià	(Spain) Xavier Pons	Mitsubishi Lancer Evo VIII	MI
48	(Japan) Fumio Nutahara	(Japan) Satoshi Hayashi	(Japan) Advan-Piaa Rally Team	Mitsubishi Lancer Evo VIII	Y
49	(Spain) Sergio López-Fombona	(Spain) Guifré Pujol	Ralliart Spain	Mitsubishi Lancer Evo VIII	—N/a
50	(Germany) Sebastian Vollak	(Germany) Michael Kölbach	(Austria) OMV World Rally Team	Mitsubishi Lancer Evo VII	P

=== Itinerary ===
All dates and times are CEST (UTC+2).

Date	Time	No.	Stage name	Distance
Leg 1 — 121.34 km
15 October	09:18	SS1	Ampaza — Col St Eustache 1	32.89 km
15 October	10:11	SS2	Aullene — Arbellara 1	27.78 km
15 October	14:32	SS3	Ampaza — Col St Eustache 2	32.89 km
15 October	15:25	SS4	Aullene — Arbellara 2	27.78 km
Leg 2 — 154.36 km
16 October	09:23	SS5	Vico — Col de Sarzoggiu 1	36.24 km
16 October	11:11	SS6	Peri — Bastelica 1	40.94 km
16 October	16:02	SS7	Vico — Col de Sarzoggiu 2	36.24 km
16 October	16:50	SS8	Peri — Bastelica 2	40.94 km
Leg 3 — 112.10 km
17 October	08:30	SS9	Penitencier Coti Chiavari — Pietra Rossa 1	24.24 km
17 October	09:16	SS10	Pont de Calzola — Agosta 1	31.81 km
17 October	12:12	SS11	Penitencier Coti Chiavari — Pietra Rossa 2	24.24 km
17 October	12:55	SS12	Pont de Calzola — Agosta 2	31.81 km

== Results ==
=== Overall ===
Pos.	No.	Driver	Co-driver	Team	Car	Time	Difference	Points
1	7	(Estonia) Markko Märtin	(United Kingdom) Michael Park	(United Kingdom) Ford Motor Co. Ltd.	Ford Focus RS WRC '04	4:11:51.4		10
2	3	(France) Sébastien Loeb	(Monaco) Daniel Elena	(France) Citroën Total WRT	Citroën Xsara WRC	4:13:53.4	+2:02.0	8
3	4	(Spain) Carlos Sainz	(Spain) Marc Martí	(France) Citroën Total WRT	Citroën Xsara WRC	4:14:46.7	+2:55.3	6
4	5	(Finland) Marcus Grönholm	(Finland) Timo Rautiainen	(France) Marlboro Peugeot Total	Peugeot 307 WRC	4:15:20.5	+3:29.1	5
5	1	(Norway) Petter Solberg	(United Kingdom) Phil Mills	(Japan) 555 Subaru World Rally Team	Subaru Impreza S10 WRC '04	4:16:57.7	+5:06.3	4
6	22	(France) Stéphane Sarrazin	(France) Patrick Pivato	Equipe de France FFSA	Subaru Impreza S9 WRC '03	4:19:00.5	+7:09.1	3
7	9	(Belgium) Freddy Loix	(Belgium) Sven Smeets	(France) Marlboro Peugeot Total	Peugeot 307 WRC	4:20:12.6	+8:21.2	2
8	12	(Germany) Armin Schwarz	(Germany) Manfred Hiemer	(Czech Republic) Škoda Motorsport	Škoda Fabia WRC	4:20:59.7	+9:08.3	1

=== World Rally Cars ===
==== Classification ====
Position		No.	Driver	Co-driver	Entrant	Car	Time	Difference	Points
Event	Class	No.	Driver	Co-driver	Entrant	Car	Time	Difference	Points
1	1	7	(Estonia) Markko Märtin	(United Kingdom) Michael Park	(United Kingdom) Ford Motor Co. Ltd.	Ford Focus RS WRC '04	4:11:51.4		10
2	2	3	(France) Sébastien Loeb	(Monaco) Daniel Elena	(France) Citroën Total WRT	Citroën Xsara WRC	4:13:53.4	+2:02.0	8
3	3	4	(Spain) Carlos Sainz	(Spain) Marc Martí	(France) Citroën Total WRT	Citroën Xsara WRC	4:14:46.7	+2:55.3	6
4	4	5	(Finland) Marcus Grönholm	(Finland) Timo Rautiainen	(France) Marlboro Peugeot Total	Peugeot 307 WRC	4:15:20.5	+3:29.1	5
5	5	1	(Norway) Petter Solberg	(United Kingdom) Phil Mills	(Japan) 555 Subaru World Rally Team	Subaru Impreza S10 WRC '04	4:16:57.7	+5:06.3	4
10	6	2	(Finland) Mikko Hirvonen	(Finland) Jarmo Lehtinen	(Japan) 555 Subaru World Rally Team	Subaru Impreza S10 WRC '04	4:23:49.6	+11:58.2	0
Retired SS9		8	(Belgium) François Duval	(Belgium) Stéphane Prévot	(United Kingdom) Ford Motor Co. Ltd.	Ford Focus RS WRC '04	Engine		0
Retired SS5		6	(France) Cédric Robert	(France) Gérald Bedon	(France) Marlboro Peugeot Total	Peugeot 307 WRC	Accident		0

==== Special stages ====
Day	Stage	Stage name	Length	Winner	Car	Time	Class leaders
Leg 1 (15 Oct)	SS1	Ampaza — Col St Eustache 1	32.89 km	(Belgium) François Duval	Ford Focus RS WRC '04	21:43.2	(Belgium) François Duval
Leg 1 (15 Oct)	SS2	Aullene — Arbellara 1	27.78 km	(Estonia) Markko Märtin	Ford Focus RS WRC '04	16:28.6	(Estonia) Markko Märtin
Leg 1 (15 Oct)	SS3	Ampaza — Col St Eustache 2	32.89 km	(Belgium) François Duval	Ford Focus RS WRC '04	21:10.3	(Belgium) François Duval
Leg 1 (15 Oct)	SS4	Aullene — Arbellara 2	27.78 km	(France) Sébastien Loeb	Citroën Xsara WRC	16:07.7	(Belgium) François Duval
Leg 2 (16 Oct)	SS5	Vico — Col de Sarzoggiu 1	36.24 km	(Estonia) Markko Märtin	Ford Focus RS WRC '04	25:49.0	(Estonia) Markko Märtin
Leg 2 (16 Oct)	SS6	Peri — Bastelica 1	40.94 km	(Estonia) Markko Märtin	Ford Focus RS WRC '04	27:01.6	(Estonia) Markko Märtin
Leg 2 (16 Oct)	SS7	Vico — Col de Sarzoggiu 2	36.24 km	(Belgium) François Duval	Ford Focus RS WRC '04	25:58.5	(Estonia) Markko Märtin
Leg 2 (16 Oct)	SS8	Peri — Bastelica 2	40.94 km	(Estonia) Markko Märtin	Ford Focus RS WRC '04	27:37.0	(Estonia) Markko Märtin
Leg 3 (17 Oct)	SS9	Penitencier Coti Chiavari — Pietra Rossa 1	24.24 km	(Norway) Petter Solberg	Subaru Impreza S10 WRC '04	15:20.7	(Estonia) Markko Märtin
Leg 3 (17 Oct)	SS10	Pont de Calzola — Agosta 1	31.81 km	(Estonia) Markko Märtin	Ford Focus RS WRC '04	19:36.4	(Estonia) Markko Märtin
Leg 3 (17 Oct)	SS11	Penitencier Coti Chiavari — Pietra Rossa 2	24.24 km	(Estonia) Markko Märtin	Ford Focus RS WRC '04	15:00.5	(Estonia) Markko Märtin
Leg 3 (17 Oct)	SS12	Pont de Calzola — Agosta 2	31.81 km	(Estonia) Markko Märtin	Ford Focus RS WRC '04	19:08.0	(Estonia) Markko Märtin

==== Championship standings ====
- **Bold text** indicates 2004 World Champions.

Pos.	Drivers' championships			Co-drivers' championships			Manufacturers' championships		
Pos.	Move	Driver	Points	Move	Co-driver	Points	Move	Manufacturer	Points
1		(France) **Sébastien Loeb**	108		(Monaco) **Daniel Elena**	108		(France) **Citroën Total WRT**	178
2		(Norway) Petter Solberg	78		(United Kingdom) Phil Mills	78		(United Kingdom) Ford Motor Co. Ltd.	127
3	1	(Estonia) Markko Märtin	69	1	(United Kingdom) Michael Park	69		(Japan) 555 Subaru World Rally Team	108
4	1	(Spain) Carlos Sainz	67	1	(Spain) Marc Martí	67		(France) Marlboro Peugeot Total	85
5		(Finland) Marcus Grönholm	54		(Finland) Timo Rautiainen	54		(Japan) Mitsubishi Motors	17

=== Production World Rally Championship ===
==== Classification ====
Position		No.	Driver	Co-driver	Entrant	Car	Time	Difference	Points
Event	Class	No.	Driver	Co-driver	Entrant	Car	Time	Difference	Points
12	1	47	(Spain) Xavier Pons	(Spain) Oriol Julià	(Spain) Xavier Pons	Mitsubishi Lancer Evo VIII	4:37:17.9		10
14	2	34	(United Kingdom) Niall McShea	(United Kingdom) Gordon Noble	(United Kingdom) Niall McShea	Subaru Impreza STI N10	4:38:16.7	+58.8	8
15	3	39	(United Kingdom) Alister McRae	(United Kingdom) David Senior	(United Kingdom) R.E.D World Rally Team	Subaru Impreza STI N10	4:39:00.2	+1:42.3	6
16	4	42	(United Kingdom) Mark Higgins	(United Kingdom) Michael Gibson	(United Kingdom) Mark Higgins	Subaru Impreza STI	4:42:10.7	+4:52.8	5
18	5	48	(Japan) Fumio Nutahara	(Japan) Satoshi Hayashi	(Japan) Advan-Piaa Rally Team	Mitsubishi Lancer Evo VIII	4:45:14.7	+7:56.8	4
19	6	46	(Poland) Tomasz Kuchar	(Poland) Jakub Gerber	(Poland) Tomasz Kuchar	Mitsubishi Lancer Evo VII	4:45:40.2	+8:22.3	3
22	7	44	(Qatar) Nasser Al-Attiyah	(United Kingdom) Chris Patterson	(Qatar) Nasser Al-Attiyah	Subaru Impreza STI N10	4:49:24.2	+12:06.3	2
23	8	36	(Mexico) Ricardo Triviño	(Spain) Jordi Barrabés	(Mexico) Triviño Racing	Mitsubishi Lancer Evo VIII	4:50:11.2	+12:53.3	1
25	9	45	(Italy) Fabio Frisiero	(Italy) Giovanni Agnese	(Italy) Fabio Frisiero	Subaru Impreza WRX STI	5:01:05.6	+23:47.7	0
27	10	50	(Germany) Sebastian Vollak	(Germany) Michael Kölbach	(Austria) OMV World Rally Team	Mitsubishi Lancer Evo VII	5:15:55.2	+38:37.3	0
Retired SS12		49	(Spain) Sergio López-Fombona	(Spain) Guifré Pujol	Ralliart Spain	Mitsubishi Lancer Evo VIII	Accident		0
Retired SS5		37	(Sweden) Joakim Roman	(Sweden) Anders Wallbom	(Sweden) Joakim Roman	Subaru Impreza STI	Retired		0
Retired SS3		35	(Argentina) Marcos Ligato	(Argentina) Diego Curletto	(Argentina) Marcos Ligato	Subaru Impreza STI N10	Driveshaft		0
Retired SS3		38	(Bulgaria) Georgi Geradzhiev Jr.	(Bulgaria) Nikola Popov	(Bulgaria) Racing Team Bulgartabac	Mitsubishi Lancer Evo VII	Gearbox		0
Retired SS2		33	(Spain) Daniel Solà	(Spain) Xavier Amigò	(Spain) Daniel Solà	Mitsubishi Lancer Evo VII	Gearbox		0
Retired SS1		43	(Italy) Gianluigi Galli	(Italy) Guido D'Amore	(Italy) Gianluigi Galli	Mitsubishi Lancer Evo VII	Engine		0

==== Special stages ====
Day	Stage	Stage name	Length	Winner	Car	Time	Class leaders
Leg 1 (15 Oct)	SS1	Ampaza — Col St Eustache 1	32.89 km	(Spain) Xavier Pons	Mitsubishi Lancer Evo VIII	23:48.4	(Spain) Xavier Pons
Leg 1 (15 Oct)	SS2	Aullene — Arbellara 1	27.78 km	(Spain) Xavier Pons	Mitsubishi Lancer Evo VIII	18:19.2	(Spain) Xavier Pons
Leg 1 (15 Oct)	SS3	Ampaza — Col St Eustache 2	32.89 km	(Spain) Xavier Pons	Mitsubishi Lancer Evo VIII	22:58.9	(Spain) Xavier Pons
Leg 1 (15 Oct)	SS4	Aullene — Arbellara 2	27.78 km	(Spain) Xavier Pons	Mitsubishi Lancer Evo VIII	17:51.5	(Spain) Xavier Pons
Leg 2 (16 Oct)	SS5	Vico — Col de Sarzoggiu 1	36.24 km	(Spain) Xavier Pons	Mitsubishi Lancer Evo VIII	28:21.1	(Spain) Xavier Pons
Leg 2 (16 Oct)	SS6	Peri — Bastelica 1	40.94 km	(Spain) Xavier Pons	Mitsubishi Lancer Evo VIII	29:47.9	(Spain) Xavier Pons
Leg 2 (16 Oct)	SS7	Vico — Col de Sarzoggiu 2	36.24 km	(Spain) Xavier Pons	Mitsubishi Lancer Evo VIII	28:18.8	(Spain) Xavier Pons
Leg 2 (16 Oct)	SS8	Peri — Bastelica 2	40.94 km	(Spain) Xavier Pons	Mitsubishi Lancer Evo VIII	30:14.7	(Spain) Xavier Pons
Leg 3 (17 Oct)	SS9	Penitencier Coti Chiavari — Pietra Rossa 1	24.24 km	(United Kingdom) Alister McRae	Subaru Impreza STI N10	16:36.9	(Spain) Xavier Pons
Leg 3 (17 Oct)	SS10	Pont de Calzola — Agosta 1	31.81 km	(United Kingdom) Niall McShea	Subaru Impreza STI N10	21:21.2	(Spain) Xavier Pons
Leg 3 (17 Oct)	SS11	Penitencier Coti Chiavari — Pietra Rossa 2	24.24 km	(United Kingdom) Niall McShea	Subaru Impreza STI N10	16:27.5	(Spain) Xavier Pons
Leg 3 (17 Oct)	SS12	Pont de Calzola — Agosta 2	31.81 km	(United Kingdom) Niall McShea	Subaru Impreza STI N10	21:08.6	(Spain) Xavier Pons

==== Championship standings ====
Pos.	Drivers' championships		
Pos.	Move	Driver	Points
1		(Finland) Jani Paasonen	29
2	4	(Spain) Xavier Pons	27
3	1	(United Kingdom) Niall McShea	27
4	2	(United Kingdom) Alister McRae	26
5	2	(Japan) Toshihiro Arai	20
