= Xavier Pons =

Spanish rally driver (born 1980)

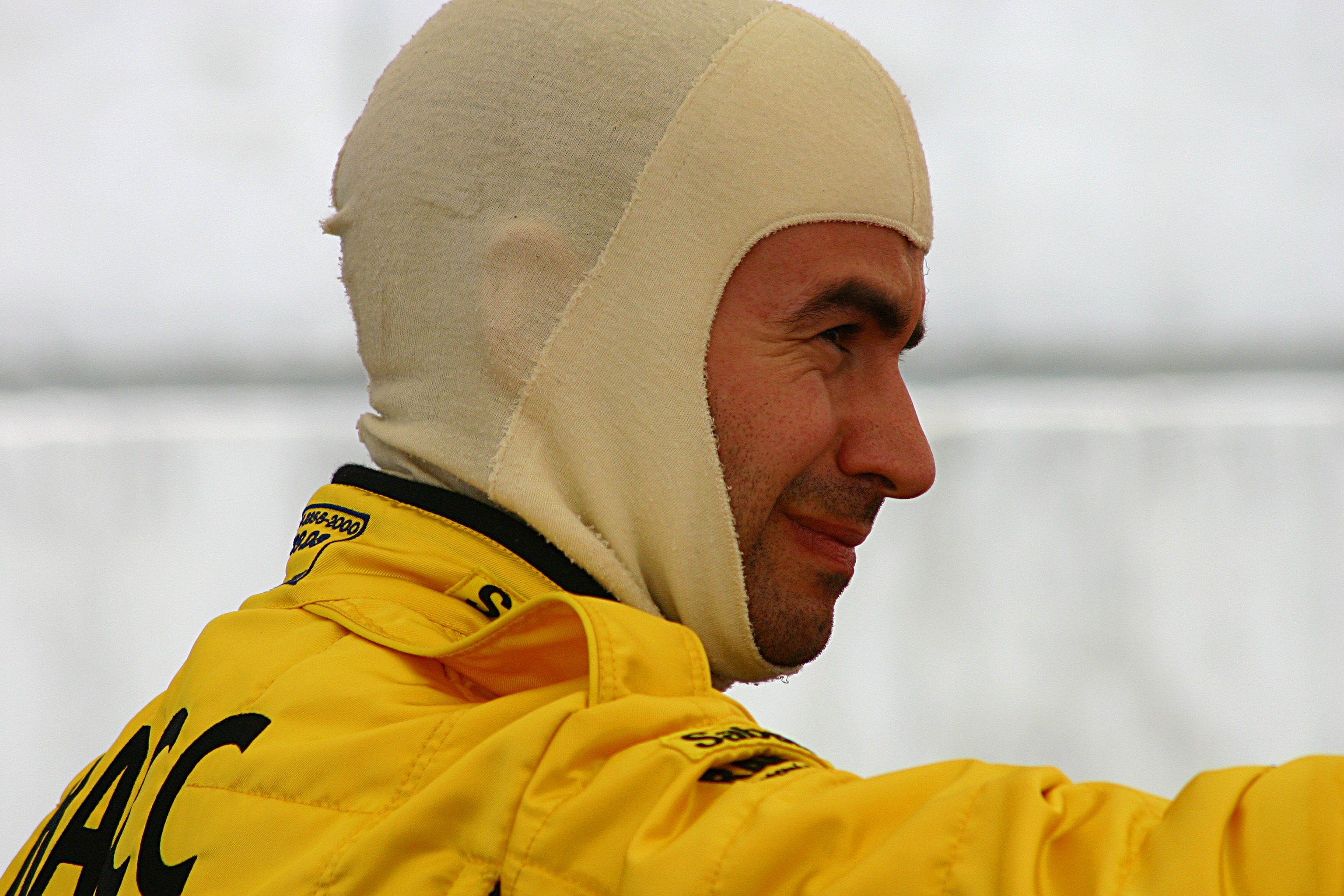
- Pons at the 2005 Cyprus Rally.

Personal information
- Nationality: (Spain) Spanish
- Full name: Xavier Pons Puigdillers
- Born: 21 January 1980 (age 46); Vic, Spain

World Rally Championship record
- Years active: 2003–2007, 2010–2011, 2014
- Co-driver: (Spain) Jordi Mercader (Spain) Oriol Julià (Spain) Lucas Cruz (Spain) Carlos del Barrio (Spain) Xavier Amigò (Spain) Álex Haro
- Teams: Citroën, Mitsubishi, Subaru
- Rallies: 72
- Championships: 0
- Rally wins: 0
- Podiums: 0
- Stage wins: 7
- Total points: 52
- First rally: 2003 Swedish Rally
- Last rally: 2014 Rally Catalunya

Xavier "Xevi" Pons Puigdillers (Note: In this Spanish name, the first or paternal surname is Pons and the second or maternal family name is Puigdillers.) (born 21 January 1980) is a Spanish rally driver who competed in the World Rally Championship from 2003 to 2014.

== Career ==
Pons started his racing career on motorcycles and won the Spanish enduro national championship in 1998. That same year, he competed with the Spanish junior team at the International Six Days Enduro and won the Junior World Trophy. He was part of the victorious Spanish team again in 2000. He continued riding in the Spanish enduro championship and was the runner-up in 2000 and 2001, also achieving success in the European and the World Enduro Championship.

In 2002, Pons switched to rallying, capturing the Spanish national Group N gravel title the following year. In the national asphalt championship, he finished second. He also debuted in the World Rally Championship at the 2003 Swedish Rally. In 2004, Pons competed in both the Junior World Rally Championship and the Production World Rally Championship. In the production car championship, he took two wins and finished fourth overall in the standings. In the junior class, he was ninth overall, with best placement being third at the Acropolis Rally. He also scored his first points in the World Rally Championship by finishing sixth at the Rally Australia.

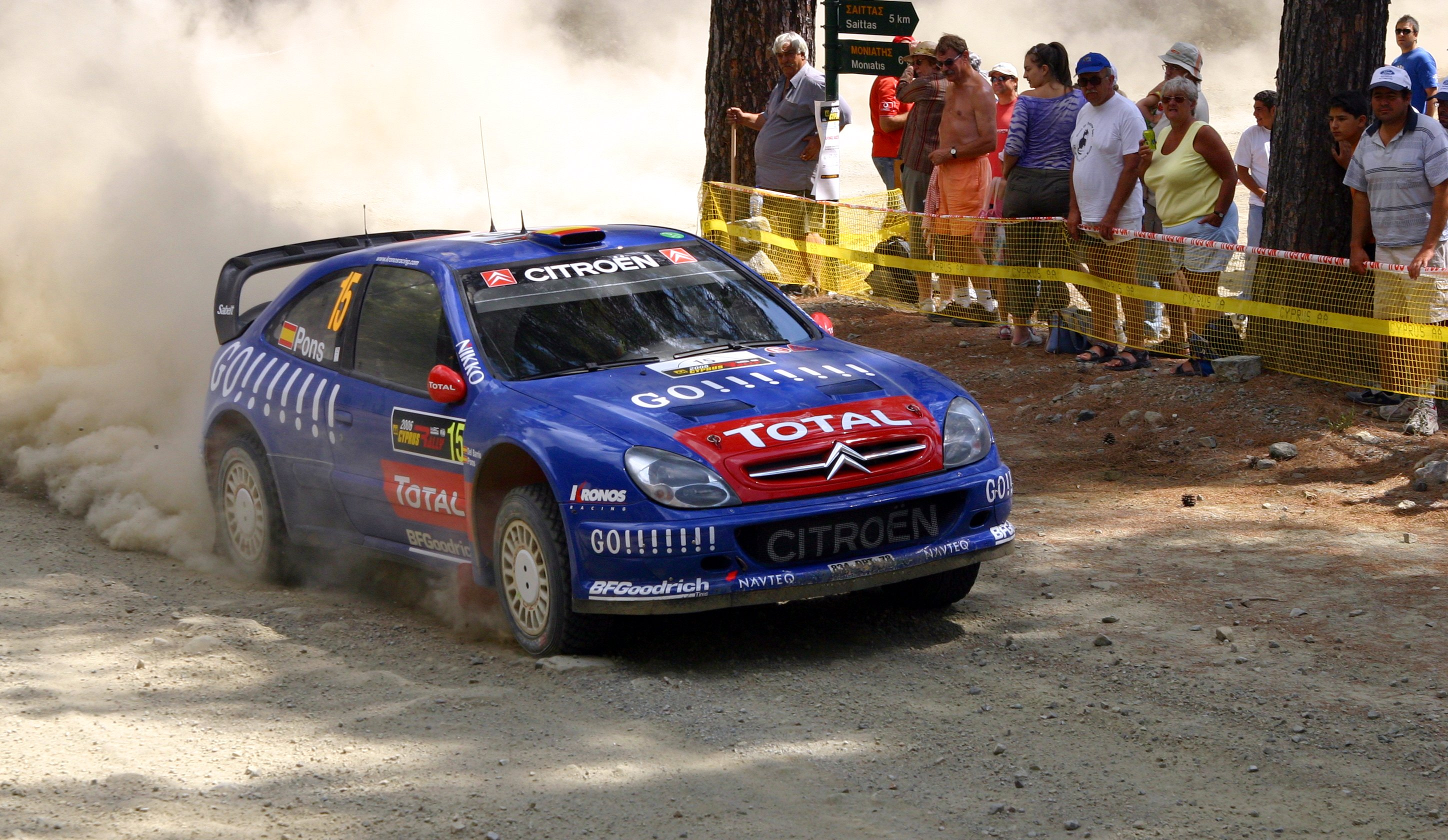
Pons at the 2006 Cyprus Rally.

Pons' 2005 season included 11 rallies with a World Rally Car and four with a production class rally car. Driving a Peugeot 206 WRC and a Citroën Xsara WRC, he finished in the points twice. His best result was fourth, at the Rally Catalunya. Seven points resulted in a 16th place in the overall championship.

For the 2006 season, Pons signed up for a full WRC season with Kronos Total Citroën, partnering the two-time World Rally Champion Sébastien Loeb. By the ninth event of the season, Rallye Deutschland, he had gathered only 11 points so the team decided to replace him with Dani Sordo as the second driver to collect manufacturers' points. Pons still failed to impress the team, and when Loeb was injured and could not compete at the Rally of Turkey, Kronos hired Colin McRae to stand in. However, at Turkey, Pons finished fourth. He was then promoted to Kronos' second seat again and he went on to finish fourth in Australia and New Zealand and fifth in the final race of the season; the Wales Rally Great Britain. With 32 points, he placed seventh overall in the championship.

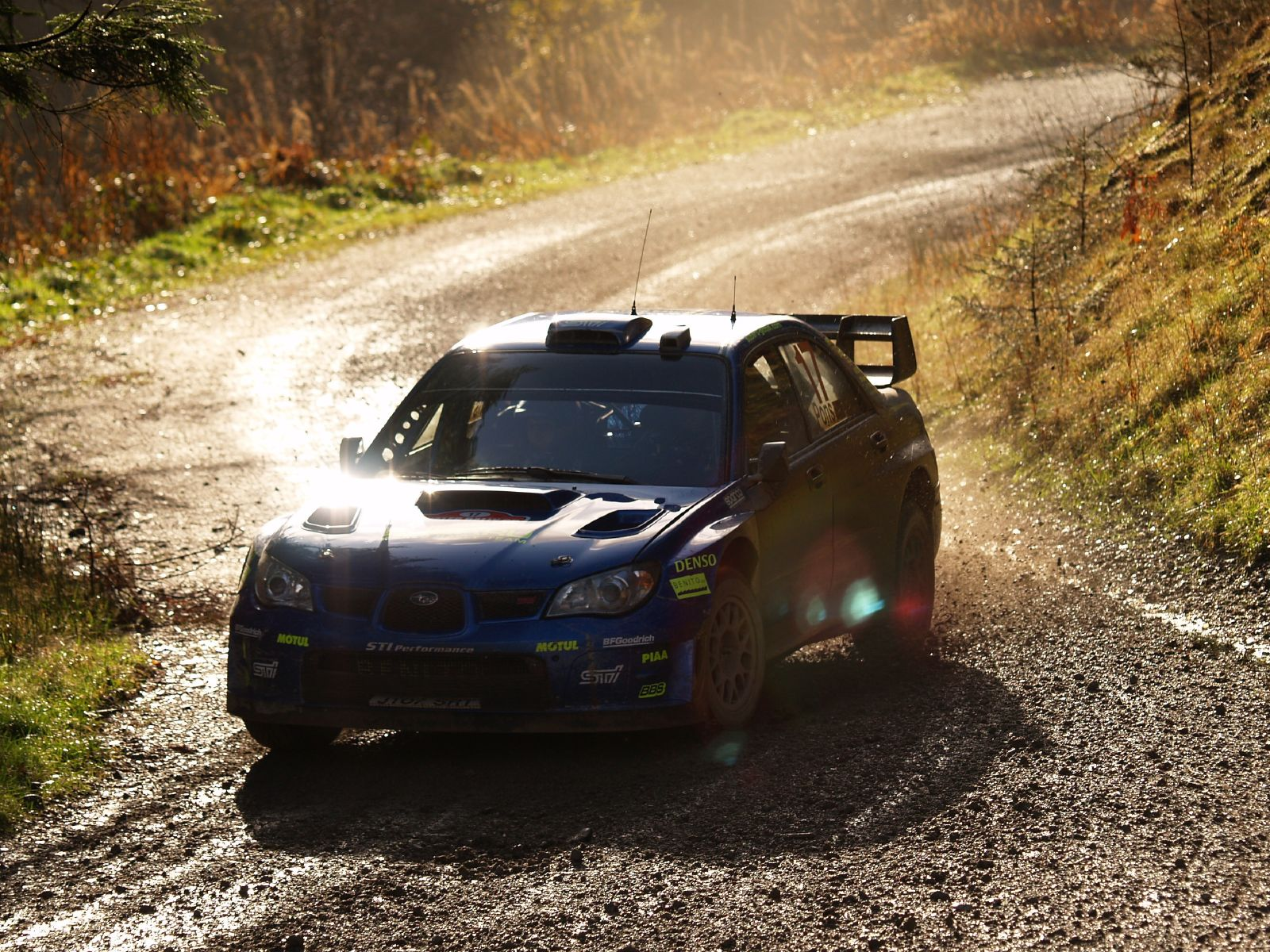
Pons driving his Subaru Impreza WRC at the 2007 Wales Rally GB.

Pons' best result in a world rally remains fourth, which he has achieved five times: In 2005 at the Rally Catalunya, and in 2006 at the Rally d'Italia Sardegna, Rally of Turkey, Rally Australia and Rally New Zealand.

After failing to land a drive in a competitive team for the 2007 season, Pons announced that he will be withdrawing from competing in the WRC. However, he vowed to stay in shape, should an opportunity arise for 2008 or for the later 2007 season. The opportunity soon came halfway through the 2007 season as the Subaru World Rally Team signed on Xevi Pons to drive a third car on the remaining events on the 2007 schedule, and contest a full schedule for Subaru in 2008 with an option for Subaru to keep his services in 2009. Despite this, Pons never did return to the Subaru for 2008. Instead, he competed on Spanish national rallies.

In 2010, Pons returned to the WRC in the newly formed SWRC class, driving a Ford Fiesta S2000 for the Nupel Global Racing team. He won his debut S2000 event in Rally Mexico. Pons also won second S2000 event in row by winning in Jordania. In both occasions, he also finished on WRC points. Pons finally won the Super 2000 World Rally Championship in 2010.

== Complete WRC results ==
Year	Entrant	Car	1	2	3	4	5	6	7	8	9	10	11	12	13	14	15	16	WDC	Points
2003	Xavier Pons	Mitsubishi Lancer Evolution V	MON	SWE; 52	TUR	NZL	ARG	GRE	CYP	GER									NC	0
2003	Xavier Pons	Mitsubishi Lancer Evolution VII									FIN; Ret	AUS	ITA	FRA; Ret	ESP; 15	GBR; 22			NC	0
2004	Xavier Pons	Fiat Punto S1600	MON; Ret				CYP	GRE; 16	TUR; Ret		FIN; 28		JPN	GBR; 24	ITA; Ret				19th	3
2004	Xavier Pons	Mitsubishi Lancer Evolution VII		SWE; 42	MEX; 16	NZL; 16				ARG; Ret						FRA; 12			19th	3
2004	Xavier Pons	Mitsubishi Lancer Evolution VIII										GER; 15						AUS; 6	19th	3
2004	Xavier Pons	Renault Clio S1600															ESP; Ret		19th	3
2005	Xavier Pons	Peugeot 206 WRC	MON; Ret		MEX; 10		ITA; Ret								JPN				15th	7
2005	Xavier Pons	Mitsubishi Lancer Evolution VIII		SWE; 38		NZL; 13		CYP; 38	TUR; 17										15th	7
2005	OMV World Rally Team	Citroën Xsara WRC								GRC; 10	ARG; 10	FIN; 12	GER; 9	GBR; 11		FRA; 7	ESP; 4	AUS; Ret	15th	7
2006	Kronos Total Citroën WRT	Citroën Xsara WRC	MON; 9	SWE; 7	MEX; Ret	ESP; Ret	FRA; 6	ARG; 17	ITA; 4	GRE; 8	GER; 14	FIN; Ret	JPN	CYP; 7	TUR; 4	AUS; 4	NZL; 4	GBR; 5	7th	32
2007	Mitsubishi Motors Motor Sports	Mitsubishi Lancer WRC05	MON; 25	SWE; Ret	NOR; 16	MEX	POR	ARG	ITA	GRE									16th	4
2007	Subaru World Rally Team	Subaru Impreza WRC 2006									FIN; 6	GER; 18	NZL; Ret	ESP; 9	FRA; 8	JPN; 35	IRE; Ret	GBR; 9	16th	4
2010	Nupel Global Racing	Ford Fiesta S2000	SWE	MEX; 8	JOR; 10	TUR	NZL; 10	POR; 12	BUL	FIN	GER; 15	JPN	FRA; 15	ESP	GBR				15th	6
2011	RMC Motorsport	Mitsubishi Lancer Evo X	SWE	MEX	POR	JOR	ITA	ARG	GRE	FIN	GER	AUS	FRA	ESP; Ret	GBR				NC	0
2014	Xavier Pons	Mitsubishi Lancer Evo X	MON	SWE	MEX	POR	ARG	ITA; 22	POL	FIN									NC	0
2014	ACSM Rallye Team	Ford Fiesta R5									GER; 12	AUS	FRA; 20	ESP; Ret	GBR				NC	0

=== JWRC results ===
Year	Entrant	Car	1	2	3	4	5	6	7	JWRC	Points
2004	Xavier Pons	Fiat Punto S1600	MON; Ret	GRE; 3	TUR; Ret	FIN; 7	GBR; 5	ITA; Ret		9th	12
2004	Xavier Pons	Renault Clio S1600							ESP; Ret	9th	12

=== PWRC results ===
Year	Entrant	Car	1	2	3	4	5	6	7	8	PWRC	Points
2004	Xavier Pons	Mitsubishi Lancer Evo VII	SWE; 15	MEX; 5	NZL; 6	ARG; Ret	GER; 1	FRA; 1	AUS; 1†		4th	27
2005	Xavier Pons	Mitsubishi Lancer Evo VIII	SWE; 4	NZL; 1	CYP; 10	TUR; 4	ARG	GBR	JPN	AUS	5th	20

† Did not score points at the 2004 Rally Australia.

=== SWRC results ===
Year	Entrant	Car	1	2	3	4	5	6	7	8	9	10	SWRC	Points
2010	Nupel Global Racing	Ford Fiesta S2000	SWE	MEX; 1	JOR; 1	NZL; 2	POR; 2	FIN	GER; 5	JPN	FRA; 4	GBR; 3	1st	123
