= 2004 Rally Catalunya =

15th round of the 2004 World Rally Championship

2004 Rally Catalunya 40th Rallye Catalunya - Costa Brava
Round 15 of the 2004 World Rally Championship season
← Previous event	Next event →
- Host country: Spain
- Rally base: Lloret de Mar
- Dates run: October 29, 2004 – October 31, 2004
- Stages: 20 (384.08 km; 238.66 miles)
- Stage surface: Asphalt
- Overall distance: 1,688.29 km (1,049.05 miles)

Statistics
- Crews: 52 at start, 37 at finish

Overall results
- Overall winner: (Estonia) Markko Märtin (United Kingdom) Michael Park (United Kingdom) Ford Motor Co. Ltd. Ford Focus RS WRC '04

The 2004 Rally Catalunya (formally the 40. Rallye Catalunya - Costa Brava) was the fifteenth round of the 2004 World Rally Championship season. The race was held over three days between 29 October and 31 October 2004, and was based in Lloret de Mar, Spain. Ford's Markko Märtin won the race, his 5th and final win in the World Rally Championship.

== Background ==
=== Entry list ===
No.	Driver	Co-Driver	Entrant	Car	Tyre
World Rally Championship manufacturer entries
1	(Norway) Petter Solberg	(United Kingdom) Phil Mills	(Japan) 555 Subaru World Rally Team	Subaru Impreza S10 WRC '04	P
2	(Finland) Mikko Hirvonen	(Finland) Jarmo Lehtinen	(Japan) 555 Subaru World Rally Team	Subaru Impreza S10 WRC '04	P
3	(France) Sébastien Loeb	(Monaco) Daniel Elena	(France) Citroën Total WRT	Citroën Xsara WRC	MI
4	(Spain) Carlos Sainz	(Spain) Marc Martí	(France) Citroën Total WRT	Citroën Xsara WRC	MI
5	(Finland) Marcus Grönholm	(Finland) Timo Rautiainen	(France) Marlboro Peugeot Total	Peugeot 307 WRC	MI
6	(Belgium) Freddy Loix	(Belgium) Sven Smeets	(France) Marlboro Peugeot Total	Peugeot 307 WRC	MI
7	(Estonia) Markko Märtin	(United Kingdom) Michael Park	(United Kingdom) Ford Motor Co. Ltd.	Ford Focus RS WRC '04	MI
8	(Belgium) François Duval	(Belgium) Stéphane Prévot	(United Kingdom) Ford Motor Co. Ltd.	Ford Focus RS WRC '04	MI
World Rally Championship entries
9	(France) Gilles Panizzi	(France) Hervé Panizzi	(Japan) Mitsubishi Motors	Mitsubishi Lancer WRC 04	MI
10	(Spain) Daniel Solà	(Spain) Xavier Amigò	(Japan) Mitsubishi Motors	Mitsubishi Lancer WRC 04	MI
11	(Germany) Armin Schwarz	(Germany) Manfred Hiemer	(Czech Republic) Škoda Motorsport	Škoda Fabia WRC	MI
12	(Finland) Toni Gardemeister	(Finland) Paavo Lukander	(Czech Republic) Škoda Motorsport	Škoda Fabia WRC	MI
14	(Italy) Gianluigi Galli	(Italy) Guido D'Amore	(Japan) Mitsubishi Motors	Mitsubishi Lancer WRC 04	MI
15	(Czech Republic) Jan Kopecký	(Czech Republic) Filip Schovánek	(Czech Republic) Škoda Motorsport	Škoda Fabia WRC	MI
16	(Germany) Antony Warmbold	(United Kingdom) Gemma Price	(Germany) Antony Warmbold	Ford Focus RS WRC '02	MI
17	(France) Nicolas Vouilloz	(France) Denis Giraudet	(France) Bozian Racing	Peugeot 206 WRC	MI
18	(France) Stéphane Sarrazin	(France) Patrick Pivato	Equipe de France FFSA	Subaru Impreza S9 WRC '03	MI
19	(Republic of Ireland) Eamonn Boland	(Republic of Ireland) Francis Regan	(Republic of Ireland) Eamonn Boland	Subaru Impreza S9 WRC '03	P
61	(Republic of Ireland) Donie O'Sullivan	(Republic of Ireland) Paul Nagle	(Republic of Ireland) Donie O'Sullivan	Ford Focus RS WRC '01	—N/a
62	(Republic of Ireland) Paddy White	(France) Bruno Brissart	(Republic of Ireland) Paddy White	Subaru Impreza S9 WRC '03	P
63	(Switzerland) Massimo Beltrami	(Italy) Fabio Ceschino	(Switzerland) Massimo Beltrami	Toyota Corolla WRC	—N/a
JWRC entries
31	(San Marino) Mirco Baldacci	(Italy) Giovanni Bernacchini	(Japan) Suzuki Sport	Suzuki Ignis S1600	P
32	(Estonia) Urmo Aava	(Estonia) Kuldar Sikk	(Japan) Suzuki Sport	Suzuki Ignis S1600	P
33	(United Kingdom) Guy Wilks	(United Kingdom) Phil Pugh	(Japan) Suzuki Sport	Suzuki Ignis S1600	P
34	(San Marino) Alessandro Broccoli	(Italy) Giovanni Agnese	(San Marino) Sab Motorsport	Fiat Punto S1600	P
35	(Finland) Kosti Katajamäki	(Finland) Timo Alanne	(Japan) Suzuki Sport	Suzuki Ignis S1600	P
36	(United Kingdom) Kris Meeke	(United Kingdom) David Senior	(United Kingdom) McRae Motorsport	Citroën C2 S1600	P
39	(France) Nicolas Bernardi	(Belgium) Jean-Marc Fortin	(France) Renault Sport	Renault Clio S1600	P
40	(France) Guerlain Chicherit	(France) Mathieu Baumel	(France) Citroën Total	Citroën C2 S1600	P
41	(United Kingdom) Natalie Barratt	(United Kingdom) Carl Williamson	(United Kingdom) Risbridger Motorsport	Renault Clio S1600	P
43	(Finland) Jari-Matti Latvala	(Finland) Miikka Anttila	(Japan) Suzuki Sport	Suzuki Ignis S1600	P
44	(Italy) Alan Scorcioni	(Italy) Fulvio Florean	(Italy) H.F. Grifone SRL	Fiat Punto S1600	P
45	(Sweden) Per-Gunnar Andersson	(Sweden) Jonas Andersson	(Japan) Suzuki Sport	Suzuki Ignis S1600	P
46	(Spain) Xavier Pons	(Spain) Oriol Julià Pascual	(Spain) RACC Motor Sport	Renault Clio S1600	P
47	(Italy) Luca Tabaton	(Italy) Gisella Rovegno	(Italy) H.F. Grifone SRL	Fiat Punto S1600	P
48	(Zimbabwe) Conrad Rautenbach	(United Kingdom) Mark Jones	(United Kingdom) Birkbeck Rallysport	Citroën Saxo S1600	P
49	(Italy) Luca Betti	(Italy) Paolo Del Grande	(Italy) Meteco Corse	Fiat Punto S1600	P
50	(United Kingdom) Oliver Marshall	(United Kingdom) Craig Parry	(United Kingdom) Prospeed Motorsport	Renault Clio S1600	P
51	(Belgium) Larry Cols	(Belgium) Filip Goddé	(France) Renault Sport	Renault Clio S1600	P

=== Itinerary ===
All dates and times are CEST (UTC+2) from 29 to 30 October 2004 and CET (UTC+1) on 31 October 2004.

Date	Time	No.	Stage name	Distance
Leg 1 — 115.04 km
29 October	09:06	SS1	La Trona 1	13.17 km
29 October	09:34	SS2	Alpens — Les Llosses 1	21.80 km
29 October	10:32	SS3	Gombrèn — St Jaume Frontanyà 1	22.55 km
29 October	13:40	SS4	La Trona 2	13.17 km
29 October	14:08	SS5	Alpens — Les Llosses 2	21.80 km
29 October	15:06	SS6	Gombrèn — St Jaume Frontanyà 2	22.55 km
Leg 2 — 162.88 km
30 October	08:36	SS7	Les Llosses — Alpens 1	21.80 km
30 October	09:14	SS8	Sta Eulàlia 1	16.80 km
30 October	09:40	SS9	Prats de Lluçanès — Olost 1	9.94 km
30 October	10:43	SS10	Sant Julià 1	32.90 km
30 October	13:51	SS11	Les Llosses — Alpens 2	21.80 km
30 October	14:29	SS12	Sta Eulàlia 2	16.80 km
30 October	14:55	SS13	Prats de Lluçanès — Olost 2	9.94 km
30 October	15:58	SS14	Sant Julià 2	32.90 km
Leg 3 — 106.16 km
31 October	07:31	SS15	Sant Boi de Lluçanès 1	12.85 km
31 October	08:19	SS16	La Roca 1	5.05 km
31 October	08:47	SS17	Viladrau 1	35.18 km
31 October	11:20	SS18	Sant Boi de Lluçanès 2	12.85 km
31 October	12:08	SS19	La Roca 2	5.05 km
31 October	12:36	SS20	Viladrau 2	35.18 km

== Results ==
=== Overall ===
Pos.	No.	Driver	Co-driver	Team	Car	Time	Difference	Points
1	7	(Estonia) Markko Märtin	(United Kingdom) Michael Park	(United Kingdom) Ford Motor Co. Ltd.	Ford Focus RS WRC '04	3:40:43.8		10
2	5	(Finland) Marcus Grönholm	(Finland) Timo Rautiainen	(France) Marlboro Peugeot Total	Peugeot 307 WRC	3:41:07.0	+23.2	8
3	4	(Spain) Carlos Sainz	(Spain) Marc Martí	(France) Citroën Total WRT	Citroën Xsara WRC	3:41:21.5	+37.7	6
4	18	(France) Stéphane Sarrazin	(France) Patrick Pivato	Equipe de France FFSA	Subaru Impreza S9 WRC '03	3:43:34.2	+2:50.4	5
5	1	(Norway) Petter Solberg	(United Kingdom) Phil Mills	(Japan) 555 Subaru World Rally Team	Subaru Impreza S10 WRC '04	3:43:50.5	+3:06.7	4
6	10	(Spain) Daniel Solà	(Spain) Xavier Amigò	(Japan) Mitsubishi Motors	Mitsubishi Lancer WRC 04	3:44:49.5	+4:05.7	3
7	14	(Italy) Gianluigi Galli	(Italy) Guido D'Amore	(Japan) Mitsubishi Motors	Mitsubishi Lancer WRC 04	3:44:49.7	+4:05.9	2
8	2	(Finland) Mikko Hirvonen	(Finland) Jarmo Lehtinen	(Japan) 555 Subaru World Rally Team	Subaru Impreza S10 WRC '04	3:45:15.5	+4:31.7	1

=== World Rally Cars ===
==== Classification ====
Position		No.	Driver	Co-driver	Entrant	Car	Time	Difference	Points
Event	Class	No.	Driver	Co-driver	Entrant	Car	Time	Difference	Points
1	1	7	(Estonia) Markko Märtin	(United Kingdom) Michael Park	(United Kingdom) Ford Motor Co. Ltd.	Ford Focus RS WRC '04	3:40:43.8		10
2	2	5	(Finland) Marcus Grönholm	(Finland) Timo Rautiainen	(France) Marlboro Peugeot Total	Peugeot 307 WRC	3:41:07.0	+23.2	8
3	3	4	(Spain) Carlos Sainz	(Spain) Marc Martí	(France) Citroën Total WRT	Citroën Xsara WRC	3:41:21.5	+37.7	6
5	4	1	(Norway) Petter Solberg	(United Kingdom) Phil Mills	(Japan) 555 Subaru World Rally Team	Subaru Impreza S10 WRC '04	3:43:50.5	+3:06.7	4
8	5	2	(Finland) Mikko Hirvonen	(Finland) Jarmo Lehtinen	(Japan) 555 Subaru World Rally Team	Subaru Impreza S10 WRC '04	3:45:15.5	+4:31.7	1
Retired SS8		3	(France) Sébastien Loeb	(Monaco) Daniel Elena	(France) Citroën Total WRT	Citroën Xsara WRC	Oil sump		0
Retired SS6		8	(Belgium) François Duval	(Belgium) Stéphane Prévot	(United Kingdom) Ford Motor Co. Ltd.	Ford Focus RS WRC '04	Suspension		0
Retired SS3		6	(Belgium) Freddy Loix	(Belgium) Sven Smeets	(France) Marlboro Peugeot Total	Peugeot 307 WRC	Electrical		0

==== Special stages ====
Day	Stage	Stage name	Length	Winner	Car	Time	Class leaders
Leg 1 (29 Oct)	SS1	La Trona 1	13.17 km	(Belgium) François Duval	Ford Focus RS WRC '04	8:33.7	(Belgium) François Duval
Leg 1 (29 Oct)	SS2	Alpens — Les Llosses 1	21.80 km	(France) Sébastien Loeb	Citroën Xsara WRC	13:09.0	(France) Sébastien Loeb
Leg 1 (29 Oct)	SS3	Gombrèn — St Jaume Frontanyà 1	22.55 km	(Belgium) François Duval	Ford Focus RS WRC '04	15:43.2	(France) Sébastien Loeb
Leg 1 (29 Oct)	SS4	La Trona 2	13.17 km	(Belgium) François Duval	Ford Focus RS WRC '04	8:27.2	(Belgium) François Duval
Leg 1 (29 Oct)	SS5	Alpens — Les Llosses 2	21.80 km	(France) Sébastien Loeb	Citroën Xsara WRC	13:33.6	(France) Sébastien Loeb
Leg 1 (29 Oct)	SS6	Gombrèn — St Jaume Frontanyà 2	22.55 km	(Estonia) Markko Märtin	Ford Focus RS WRC '04	15:32.2	(France) Sébastien Loeb
Leg 2 (30 Oct)	SS7	Les Llosses — Alpens 1	21.80 km	(France) Sébastien Loeb	Citroën Xsara WRC	13:13.7	(France) Sébastien Loeb
Leg 2 (30 Oct)	SS8	Sta Eulàlia 1	16.80 km	(Estonia) Markko Märtin	Ford Focus RS WRC '04	9:44.1	(Estonia) Markko Märtin
Leg 2 (30 Oct)	SS9	Prats de Lluçanès — Olost 1	9.94 km	(Finland) Marcus Grönholm	Peugeot 307 WRC	5:14.9	(Estonia) Markko Märtin
Leg 2 (30 Oct)	SS10	Sant Julià 1	32.90 km	Stage cancelled			(Estonia) Markko Märtin
Leg 2 (30 Oct)	SS11	Les Llosses — Alpens 2	21.80 km	(Finland) Marcus Grönholm	Peugeot 307 WRC	13:16.2	(Estonia) Markko Märtin
Leg 2 (30 Oct)	SS12	Sta Eulàlia 2	16.80 km	(Estonia) Markko Märtin	Ford Focus RS WRC '04	9:49.7	(Estonia) Markko Märtin
Leg 2 (30 Oct)	SS13	Prats de Lluçanès — Olost 2	9.94 km	(Finland) Marcus Grönholm	Peugeot 307 WRC	5:12.8	(Estonia) Markko Märtin
Leg 2 (30 Oct)	SS14	Sant Julià 2	32.90 km	(Spain) Carlos Sainz	Citroën Xsara WRC	19:25.3	(Estonia) Markko Märtin
Leg 3 (31 Oct)	SS15	Sant Boi de Lluçanès 1	12.85 km	(France) Stéphane Sarrazin	Subaru Impreza S9 WRC '03	8:49.5	(Estonia) Markko Märtin
Leg 3 (31 Oct)	SS16	La Roca 1	5.05 km	(Spain) Carlos Sainz (Estonia) Markko Märtin	Citroën Xsara WRC; Ford Focus RS WRC '04	3:09.0	(Estonia) Markko Märtin
Leg 3 (31 Oct)	SS17	Viladrau 1	35.18 km	(Estonia) Markko Märtin	Ford Focus RS WRC '04	22:23.7	(Estonia) Markko Märtin
Leg 3 (31 Oct)	SS18	Sant Boi de Lluçanès 2	12.85 km	(Finland) Marcus Grönholm	Peugeot 307 WRC	8:51.6	(Estonia) Markko Märtin
Leg 3 (31 Oct)	SS19	La Roca 2	5.05 km	(Finland) Marcus Grönholm	Peugeot 307 WRC	3:06.2	(Estonia) Markko Märtin
Leg 3 (31 Oct)	SS20	Viladrau 2	35.18 km	(Finland) Marcus Grönholm	Peugeot 307 WRC	22:31.0	(Estonia) Markko Märtin

==== Championship standings ====
- **Bold text** indicates 2004 World Champions.

Pos.	Drivers' championships			Co-drivers' championships			Manufacturers' championships		
Pos.	Move	Driver	Points	Move	Co-driver	Points	Move	Manufacturer	Points
1		(France) **Sébastien Loeb**	108		(Monaco) **Daniel Elena**	108		(France) **Citroën Total WRT**	184
2		(Norway) Petter Solberg	82		(United Kingdom) Phil Mills	82		(United Kingdom) Ford Motor Co. Ltd.	137
3		(Estonia) Markko Märtin	79		(United Kingdom) Michael Park	79		(Japan) 555 Subaru World Rally Team	117
4		(Spain) Carlos Sainz	73		(Spain) Marc Martí	73		(France) Marlboro Peugeot Total	93
5		(Finland) Marcus Grönholm	62		(Finland) Timo Rautiainen	62		(Japan) Mitsubishi Motors	17

=== Junior World Rally Championship ===
==== Classification ====
Position		No.	Driver	Co-driver	Entrant	Car	Time	Difference	Points
Event	Class	No.	Driver	Co-driver	Entrant	Car	Time	Difference	Points
14	1	39	(France) Nicolas Bernardi	(Belgium) Jean-Marc Fortin	(France) Renault Sport	Renault Clio S1600	3:58:08.7		10
16	2	45	(Sweden) Per-Gunnar Andersson	(Sweden) Jonas Andersson	(Japan) Suzuki Sport	Suzuki Ignis S1600	4:01:09.5	+3:00.8	8
17	3	31	(San Marino) Mirco Baldacci	(Italy) Giovanni Bernacchini	(Japan) Suzuki Sport	Suzuki Ignis S1600	4:02:06.4	+3:57.7	6
19	4	51	(Belgium) Larry Cols	(Belgium) Filip Goddé	(France) Renault Sport	Renault Clio S1600	4:02:35.5	+4:26.8	5
23	5	35	(Finland) Kosti Katajamäki	(Finland) Timo Alanne	(Japan) Suzuki Sport	Suzuki Ignis S1600	4:05:22.0	+7:13.3	4
25	6	36	(United Kingdom) Kris Meeke	(United Kingdom) David Senior	(United Kingdom) McRae Motorsport	Citroën C2 S1600	4:06:59.8	+8:51.1	3
26	7	44	(Italy) Alan Scorcioni	(Italy) Fulvio Florean	(Italy) H.F. Grifone SRL	Fiat Punto S1600	4:08:07.4	+9:58.7	2
27	8	34	(San Marino) Alessandro Broccoli	(Italy) Giovanni Agnese	(San Marino) Sab Motorsport	Fiat Punto S1600	4:10:31.2	+12:22.5	1
29	9	43	(Finland) Jari-Matti Latvala	(Finland) Miikka Anttila	(Japan) Suzuki Sport	Suzuki Ignis S1600	4:13:50.7	+15:42.0	0
33	10	49	(Italy) Luca Betti	(Italy) Paolo Del Grande	(Italy) Meteco Corse	Fiat Punto S1600	4:18:49.8	+20:41.1	0
34	11	48	(Zimbabwe) Conrad Rautenbach	(United Kingdom) Mark Jones	(United Kingdom) Birkbeck Rallysport	Citroën Saxo S1600	4:20:18.3	+22:09.6	0
Retired SS18		47	(Italy) Luca Tabaton	(Italy) Gisella Rovegno	(Italy) H.F. Grifone SRL	Fiat Punto S1600	Accident		0
Retired SS15		33	(United Kingdom) Guy Wilks	(United Kingdom) Phil Pugh	(Japan) Suzuki Sport	Suzuki Ignis S1600	Accident		0
Retired SS14		50	(United Kingdom) Oliver Marshall	(United Kingdom) Craig Parry	(United Kingdom) Prospeed Motorsport	Renault Clio S1600	Brakes		0
Retired SS11		32	(Estonia) Urmo Aava	(Estonia) Kuldar Sikk	(Japan) Suzuki Sport	Suzuki Ignis S1600	Gearbox		0
Retired SS6		41	(United Kingdom) Natalie Barratt	(United Kingdom) Carl Williamson	(United Kingdom) Risbridger Motorsport	Renault Clio S1600	Engine		0
Retired SS6		46	(Spain) Xavier Pons	(Spain) Oriol Julià Pascual	(Spain) RACC Motor Sport	Renault Clio S1600	Accident		0
Retired SS4		40	(France) Guerlain Chicherit	(France) Mathieu Baumel	(France) Citroën Total	Citroën C2 S1600	Accident		0

==== Special stages ====
Day	Stage	Stage name	Length	Winner	Car	Time	Class leaders
Leg 1 (29 Oct)	SS1	La Trona 1	13.17 km	(Spain) Xavier Pons	Renault Clio S1600	9:05.7	(Spain) Xavier Pons
Leg 1 (29 Oct)	SS2	Alpens — Les Llosses 1	21.80 km	(Sweden) Per-Gunnar Andersson	Suzuki Ignis S1600	14:40.3	(France) Nicolas Bernardi
Leg 1 (29 Oct)	SS3	Gombrèn — St Jaume Frontanyà 1	22.55 km	(Spain) Xavier Pons	Renault Clio S1600	17:00.8	(Sweden) Per-Gunnar Andersson
Leg 1 (29 Oct)	SS4	La Trona 2	13.17 km	(Spain) Xavier Pons	Renault Clio S1600	9:00.5	(Sweden) Per-Gunnar Andersson
Leg 1 (29 Oct)	SS5	Alpens — Les Llosses 2	21.80 km	(Belgium) Larry Cols	Renault Clio S1600	14:35.4	(Spain) Xavier Pons
Leg 1 (29 Oct)	SS6	Gombrèn — St Jaume Frontanyà 2	22.55 km	(San Marino) Mirco Baldacci	Suzuki Ignis S1600	16:43.2	(San Marino) Mirco Baldacci
Leg 2 (30 Oct)	SS7	Les Llosses — Alpens 1	21.80 km	(France) Nicolas Bernardi	Renault Clio S1600	14:07.9	(San Marino) Mirco Baldacci
Leg 2 (30 Oct)	SS8	Sta Eulàlia 1	16.80 km	(Belgium) Larry Cols	Renault Clio S1600	10:21.3	(France) Nicolas Bernardi
Leg 2 (30 Oct)	SS9	Prats de Lluçanès — Olost 1	9.94 km	(France) Nicolas Bernardi	Renault Clio S1600	5:37.8	(France) Nicolas Bernardi
Leg 2 (30 Oct)	SS10	Sant Julià 1	32.90 km	Stage cancelled			(France) Nicolas Bernardi
Leg 2 (30 Oct)	SS11	Les Llosses — Alpens 2	21.80 km	(France) Nicolas Bernardi	Renault Clio S1600	14:12.2	(France) Nicolas Bernardi
Leg 2 (30 Oct)	SS12	Sta Eulàlia 2	16.80 km	(Spain) Xavier Pons	Renault Clio S1600	10:28.6	(France) Nicolas Bernardi
Leg 2 (30 Oct)	SS13	Prats de Lluçanès — Olost 2	9.94 km	(France) Nicolas Bernardi	Renault Clio S1600	5:38.2	(France) Nicolas Bernardi
Leg 2 (30 Oct)	SS14	Sant Julià 2	32.90 km	(France) Nicolas Bernardi	Renault Clio S1600	20:54.2	(France) Nicolas Bernardi
Leg 3 (31 Oct)	SS15	Sant Boi de Lluçanès 1	12.85 km	(France) Nicolas Bernardi	Renault Clio S1600	9:19.9	(France) Nicolas Bernardi
Leg 3 (31 Oct)	SS16	La Roca 1	5.05 km	(France) Nicolas Bernardi	Renault Clio S1600	3:24.7	(France) Nicolas Bernardi
Leg 3 (31 Oct)	SS17	Viladrau 1	35.18 km	(France) Nicolas Bernardi	Renault Clio S1600	24:12.5	(France) Nicolas Bernardi
Leg 3 (31 Oct)	SS18	Sant Boi de Lluçanès 2	12.85 km	(San Marino) Mirco Baldacci	Suzuki Ignis S1600	9:34.3	(France) Nicolas Bernardi
Leg 3 (31 Oct)	SS19	La Roca 2	5.05 km	(France) Nicolas Bernardi	Renault Clio S1600	3:17.5	(France) Nicolas Bernardi
Leg 3 (31 Oct)	SS20	Viladrau 2	35.18 km	(Spain) Xavier Pons	Renault Clio S1600	24:26.7	(France) Nicolas Bernardi

==== Championship standings ====
- **Bold text** indicates 2004 World Champions.

Pos.	Drivers' championships		
Pos.	Move	Driver	Points
1	1	(Sweden) **Per-Gunnar Andersson**	39
2	1	(France) Nicolas Bernardi	37
3	2	(United Kingdom) Guy Wilks	34
4		(Finland) Kosti Katajamäki	31
5		(San Marino) Mirco Baldacci	23
