= 2004 Monte Carlo Rally =

Rallying motorsport event

2004 Monte Carlo Rally 72ème Rallye Automobile de Monte-Carlo
Round 1 of the 2004 World Rally Championship season
Next event →
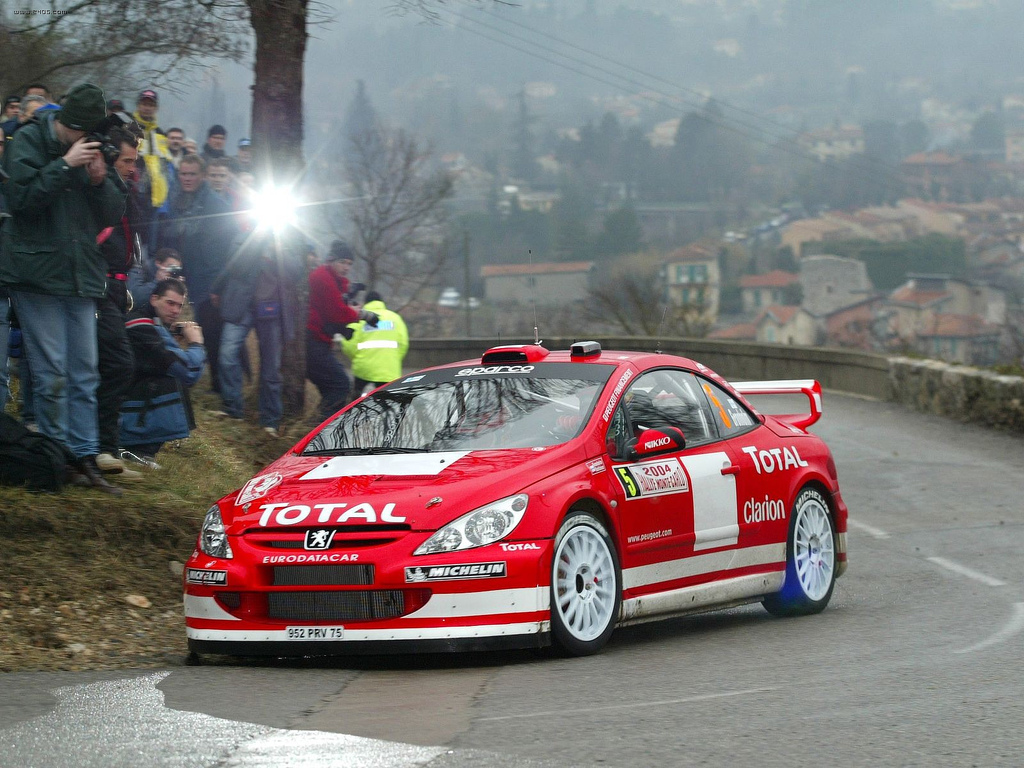
- Marcus Grönholm made his Peugeot 307 WRC debut, finishing fourth.
- Host country: Monaco
- Rally base: French Riviera
- Dates run: 23 – 25 January 2004
- Stages: 15 (389.12 km; 241.79 miles)
- Stage surface: Tarmac/snow/ice
- Overall distance: 1,331.92 km (827.62 miles)

Statistics
- Crews: 44 at start, 20 at finish

Overall results
- Overall winner: (France) Sébastien Loeb (Monaco) Daniel Elena (France) Citroën Total; 4:12:03.0

The 2004 Monte Carlo Rally (formally the 72^{e} Rallye Automobile de Monte-Carlo) was the first round of the 2004 World Rally Championship. The race was held over three days between 23 and 25 January 2004, and was won by Citroën's Sébastien Loeb, his 5th win in the World Rally Championship.

== Background ==
=== Entry list ===
No.	Driver	Co-Driver	Entrant	Car	Tyre
World Rally Championship manufacturer entries
1	(Norway) Petter Solberg	(United Kingdom) Phil Mills	(Japan) 555 Subaru World Rally Team	Subaru Impreza S9 WRC '03	P
2	(Finland) Mikko Hirvonen	(Finland) Jarmo Lehtinen	(Japan) 555 Subaru World Rally Team	Subaru Impreza S9 WRC '03	P
3	(France) Sébastien Loeb	(Monaco) Daniel Elena	(France) Citroën Total WRT	Citroën Xsara WRC	M
4	(Spain) Carlos Sainz	(Spain) Marc Martí	(France) Citroën Total WRT	Citroën Xsara WRC	M
5	(Finland) Marcus Grönholm	(Finland) Timo Rautiainen	(France) Marlboro Peugeot Total	Peugeot 307 WRC	M
6	(Belgium) Freddy Loix	(Belgium) Sven Smeets	(France) Marlboro Peugeot Total	Peugeot 307 WRC	M
7	(Estonia) Markko Märtin	(United Kingdom) Michael Park	(United Kingdom) Ford Motor Co. Ltd.	Ford Focus RS WRC '03	M
8	(Belgium) François Duval	(Belgium) Stéphane Prévot	(United Kingdom) Ford Motor Co. Ltd.	Ford Focus RS WRC '03	M
9	(France) Gilles Panizzi	(France) Hervé Panizzi	(Japan) Mitsubishi Motors	Mitsubishi Lancer WRC 04	M
10	(Italy) Gianluigi Galli	(Italy) Guido D'Amore	(Japan) Mitsubishi Motors	Mitsubishi Lancer WRC 04	M
World Rally Championship entries
11	(Germany) Antony Warmbold	(United Kingdom) Gemma Price	(United Kingdom) Ford Motor Co. Ltd.	Ford Focus RS WRC '02	M
61	(France) Nicolas Vouilloz	(France) David Fiorini	(France) Bozian Racing	Peugeot 206 WRC	M
62	(Portugal) Miguel Campos	(Portugal) Nuno Rodrigues da Silva	(France) Bozian Racing	Peugeot 206 WRC	M
63	(Switzerland) Olivier Burri	(Switzerland) Jean-Philippe Patthey	(Switzerland) Olivier Burri	Subaru Impreza S9 WRC '03	P
64	(Italy) Riccardo Errani	(Italy) Stefano Casadio	(Italy) Riccardo Errani	Škoda Octavia WRC Evo3	P
65	(France) Alexandre Bengué	(France) Caroline Escudero-Bengué	(France) Alexandre Bengué	Peugeot 206 WRC	M
66	(Republic of Ireland) Eamonn Boland	(Republic of Ireland) Francis Regan	(Republic of Ireland) Eamonn Boland	Subaru Impreza S7 WRC '01	P
67	(Switzerland) Philippe Roux	(Switzerland) Paul Corthay	(Switzerland) Philppe Roux	Ford Focus RS WRC'02	P
69	(Czech Republic) Roman Kresta	(Czech Republic) Jan Tománek	(Czech Republic) Roman Kresta	Hyundai Accent WRC	M
70	(Finland) Jussi Välimäki	(Finland) Jakke Honkanen	(Finland) Jussi Välimäki	Hyundai Accent WRC	M
71	(Slovakia) Jozef Béreš Jr.	(Czech Republic) Petr Starý	(Slovakia) Jozef Béreš Jr.	Hyundai Accent WRC	M
72	(Italy) Moreno Fidiani	(Italy) Maria Grazia Bergonzi	(Italy) Moreno Fidiani	Mitsubishi Lancer Evo V	
JWRC entries
31	(San Marino) Mirco Baldacci	(Italy) Giovanni Bernacchini	(Japan) Suzuki Sport	Suzuki Ignis S1600	P
32	(Estonia) Urmo Aava	(Estonia) Kuldar Sikk	(Japan) Suzuki Sport	Suzuki Ignis S1600	P
33	(United Kingdom) Guy Wilks	(United Kingdom) Phil Pugh	(Japan) Suzuki Sport	Suzuki Ignis S1600	P
34	(San Marino) Alessandro Broccoli	(Italy) Giovanni Agnese	(San Marino) Sab Motorsport	Fiat Punto S1600	P
35	(Finland) Kosti Katajamäki	(Finland) Timo Alanne	(Japan) Suzuki Sport	Suzuki Ignis S1600	P
36	(United Kingdom) Kris Meeke	(United Kingdom) Chris Patterson	(United Kingdom) McRae Motorsport	Opel Corsa S1600	P
37	(Italy) Luca Cecchettini	(Italy) Nicola Arena	(Italy) Autorel Sport	Renault Clio S1600	P
38	(Lebanon) Abdo Feghali	(Lebanon) Joseph Matar	(Italy) Astra Racing	Ford Puma S1600	P
39	(France) Nicolas Bernardi	(France) Denis Giraudet	(France) Renault Sport	Renault Clio S1600	P
40	(France) Guerlain Chicherit	(France) Michel Perin	(France) Citroën Total	Citroën Saxo S1600	P
41	(United Kingdom) Natalie Barratt	(United Kingdom) Carl Williamson	(United Kingdom) Risbridger Motorsport	MG ZR S1600	P
42	(France) Mathieu Biasion	(France) Philippe Coquard	(Italy) H.F. Grifone SRL	Fiat Punto S1600	P
43	(Finland) Jari-Matti Latvala	(Finland) Miikka Anttila	(Italy) Astra Racing	Ford Puma S1600	P
44	(Italy) Alan Scorcioni	(Italy) Massimo Daddoveri	(Italy) H.F. Grifone SRL	Fiat Punto S1600	P
45	(Sweden) Per-Gunnar Andersson	(Sweden) Jonas Andersson	(Japan) Suzuki Sport	Suzuki Ignis S1600	P
46	(Spain) Xavier Pons	(Spain) Oriol Julià Pascual	(Spain) RACC Motor Sport	Fiat Punto S1600	P
47	(Italy) Luca Tabaton	(Italy) Gisella Rovegno	(Italy) H.F. Grifone SRL	Fiat Punto S1600	P
48	(Zimbabwe) Conrad Rautenbach	(Zimbabwe) Peter Marsh	(United Kingdom) Birkbeck Rallysport	Ford Puma S1600	P
49	(Italy) Luca Betti	(Italy) Michele Rosso	(Italy) Meteco Corse	Peugeot 206 S1600	P
50	(United Kingdom) Oliver Marshall	(United Kingdom) Craig Parry	(United Kingdom) Prospeed Motorsport	Renault Clio S1600	P
51	(Belgium) Larry Cols	(Belgium) Filip Goddé	(France) Renault Sport	Renault Clio S1600	P

=== Itinerary ===
All dates and times are CET (UTC+1).

Date	Time	No.	Stage name	Distance
Leg 1 — 144.13 km
23 January	07:48	SS1	Selonnet — Bréziers 1	22.64 km
23 January	08:26	SS2	Piégut — Urtis 1	20.18 km
23 January	10:09	SS3	Selonnet — Bréziers 2	22.64 km
23 January	10:47	SS4	Piégut — Urtis 2	20.18 km
23 January	13:05	SS5	Laborel — L'Aubergerie	26.68 km
23 January	13:48	SS6	Rosans — L'Epine	31.81 km
Leg 2 — 140.79 km
24 January	08:18	SS7	Lantosque — Col de Braus	34.41 km
24 January	11:21	SS8	Tourette du Château — St Antonin 1	24.80 km
24 January	12:04	SS9	Sigale — Col de Bleine 1	28.39 km
24 January	15:52	SS10	Tourette du Château — St Antonin 2	24.80 km
24 January	16:35	SS11	Sigale — Col de Bleine 2	28.39 km
Leg 3 — 104.20 km
25 January	08:45	SS12	Sospel — Turini — La Bollène 1	32.58 km
25 January	09:38	SS13	Lantosque — Lucéram 1	19.52 km
25 January	12:05	SS14	Sospel — Turini — La Bollène 2	32.58 km
25 January	12:58	SS15	Lantosque — Lucéram 2	19.52 km

== Report ==
=== Overall ===
Pos.	No.	Driver	Co-driver	Team	Car	Time	Difference	Points
1	3	(France) Sébastien Loeb	(Monaco) Daniel Elena	(France) Citroën Total	Citroën Xsara WRC	4:12:03.0		10
2	7	(Estonia) Markko Märtin	(United Kingdom) Michael Park	(United Kingdom) Ford Motor Co Ltd	Ford Focus RS WRC '03	4:13:15.6	+1:12.6	8
3	8	(Belgium) François Duval	(Belgium) Stéphane Prévot	(United Kingdom) Ford Motor Co Ltd	Ford Focus RS WRC '03	4:13:22.6	+1:19.6	6
4	5	(Finland) Marcus Grönholm	(Finland) Timo Rautiainen	(France) Marlboro Peugeot Total	Peugeot 307 WRC	4:13:29.8	+1:26.8	5
5	6	(Belgium) Freddy Loix	(Belgium) Sven Smeets	(France) Marlboro Peugeot Total	Peugeot 307 WRC	4:20:19.9	+8:16.9	4
6	9	(France) Gilles Panizzi	(France) Hervé Panizzi	(Japan) Mitsubishi Motors Motor Sports	Mitsubishi Lancer WRC 04	4:22:14.6	+10:11.6	3
7	1	(Norway) Petter Solberg	(United Kingdom) Phil Mills	(Japan) 555 Subaru World Rally Team	Subaru Impreza S9 WRC '03	4:22:45.2	+10:42.2	2
8	63	(Switzerland) Olivier Burri	(Switzerland) Jean-Philippe Patthey	(Switzerland) Scuderia Chicco d'Oro	Subaru Impreza S9 WRC '03	4:29:58.1	+17:49.1	1

=== World Rally Cars ===
==== Classification ====
Position		No.	Driver	Co-driver	Entrant	Car	Time	Difference	Points
Event	Class	No.	Driver	Co-driver	Entrant	Car	Time	Difference	Points
1	1	3	(France) Sébastien Loeb	(Monaco) Daniel Elena	(France) Citroën Total	Citroën Xsara WRC	4:12:03.0		10
2	2	7	(Estonia) Markko Märtin	(United Kingdom) Michael Park	(United Kingdom) Ford Motor Co Ltd	Ford Focus RS WRC '03	4:13:15.6	+1:12.6	8
3	3	8	(Belgium) François Duval	(Belgium) Stéphane Prévot	(United Kingdom) Ford Motor Co Ltd	Ford Focus RS WRC '03	4:13:22.6	+1:19.6	6
4	4	5	(Finland) Marcus Grönholm	(Finland) Timo Rautiainen	(France) Marlboro Peugeot Total	Peugeot 307 WRC	4:13:29.8	+1:26.8	5
5	5	6	(Belgium) Freddy Loix	(Belgium) Sven Smeets	(France) Marlboro Peugeot Total	Peugeot 307 WRC	4:20:19.9	+8:16.9	4
6	6	9	(France) Gilles Panizzi	(France) Hervé Panizzi	(Japan) Mitsubishi Motors Motor Sports	Mitsubishi Lancer WRC 04	4:22:14.6	+10:11.6	3
7	7	1	(Norway) Petter Solberg	(United Kingdom) Phil Mills	(Japan) 555 Subaru World Rally Team	Subaru Impreza S9 WRC '03	4:22:45.2	+10:42.2	2
Retired SS9		2	(Finland) Mikko Hirvonen	(Finland) Jarmo Lehtinen	(Japan) 555 Subaru World Rally Team	Subaru Impreza S9 WRC '03	Accident		0
Retired SS9		4	(Spain) Carlos Sainz	(Spain) Marc Martí	(France) Citroën Total WRT	Citroën Xsara WRC	Accident		0
Retired SS5		10	(Italy) Gianluigi Galli	(Italy) Guido D'Amore	(Japan) Mitsubishi Motors	Mitsubishi Lancer WRC 04	Accident		0

==== Special stages ====
Day	Stage	Stage name	Length	Winner	Car	Time	Class leaders
Leg 1 (23 Jan)	SS1	Selonnet — Bréziers 1	22.64 km	Stage cancelled			
Leg 1 (23 Jan)	SS2	Piégut — Urtis 1	20.18 km	(Finland) Marcus Grönholm	Peugeot 307 WRC	17:20.9	(Finland) Marcus Grönholm
Leg 1 (23 Jan)	SS3	Selonnet — Bréziers 2	22.64 km	(Estonia) Markko Märtin	Ford Focus RS WRC '03	15:45.6	(Finland) Marcus Grönholm
Leg 1 (23 Jan)	SS4	Piégut — Urtis 2	20.18 km	(France) Sébastien Loeb	Citroën Xsara WRC	16:53.7	(Finland) Marcus Grönholm
Leg 1 (23 Jan)	SS5	Laborel — L'Aubergerie	26.68 km	(Finland) Marcus Grönholm	Peugeot 307 WRC	18:04.1	(Finland) Marcus Grönholm
Leg 1 (23 Jan)	SS6	Rosans — L'Epine	31.81 km	(France) Sébastien Loeb	Citroën Xsara WRC	18:15.2	(France) Sébastien Loeb
Leg 2 (24 Jan)	SS7	Lantosque — Col de Braus	34.41 km	Notional stage time			(France) Sébastien Loeb
Leg 2 (24 Jan)	SS8	Tourette du Château — St Antonin 1	24.80 km	(France) Sébastien Loeb	Citroën Xsara WRC	18:14.9	(France) Sébastien Loeb
Leg 2 (24 Jan)	SS9	Sigale — Col de Bleine 1	28.39 km	(France) Sébastien Loeb	Citroën Xsara WRC	20:11.6	(France) Sébastien Loeb
Leg 2 (24 Jan)	SS10	Tourette du Château — St Antonin 2	24.80 km	Stage cancelled			(France) Sébastien Loeb
Leg 2 (24 Jan)	SS11	Sigale — Col de Bleine 2	28.39 km	(France) Sébastien Loeb	Citroën Xsara WRC	20:36.1	(France) Sébastien Loeb
Leg 3 (25 Jan)	SS12	Sospel — Turini — La Bollène 1	32.58 km	(Estonia) Markko Märtin	Ford Focus RS WRC '03	25:09.0	(France) Sébastien Loeb
Leg 3 (25 Jan)	SS13	Lantosque — Lucéram 1	19.52 km	(Norway) Petter Solberg	Subaru Impreza S9 WRC '03	13:59.4	(France) Sébastien Loeb
Leg 3 (25 Jan)	SS14	Sospel — Turini — La Bollène 2	32.58 km	(Estonia) Markko Märtin	Ford Focus RS WRC '03	24:03.9	(France) Sébastien Loeb
Leg 3 (25 Jan)	SS15	Lantosque — Lucéram 2	19.52 km	(Finland) Marcus Grönholm	Peugeot 307 WRC	13:46.1	(France) Sébastien Loeb

==== Championship standings ====
Pos.	Drivers' championships			Co-drivers' championships			Manufacturers' championships		
Pos.	Move	Driver	Points	Move	Co-driver	Points	Move	Manufacturer	Points
1	New entry	(France) Sébastien Loeb	10	New entry	(Monaco) Daniel Elena	10	New entry	(United Kingdom) Ford Motor Co. Ltd.	14
2	New entry	(Estonia) Markko Märtin	8	New entry	(United Kingdom) Michael Park	8	New entry	(France) Citroën Total WRT	10
3	New entry	(Belgium) François Duval	6	New entry	(Belgium) Stéphane Prévot	6	New entry	(France) Marlboro Peugeot Total	9
4	New entry	(Finland) Marcus Grönholm	5	New entry	(Finland) Timo Rautiainen	5	New entry	(Japan) Mitsubishi Motors	3
5	New entry	(Belgium) Freddy Loix	4	New entry	(Belgium) Sven Smeets	4	New entry	(Japan) 555 Subaru World Rally Team	2

=== Junior World Rally Championship ===
==== Classification ====
Position		No.	Driver	Co-driver	Entrant	Car	Time	Difference	Points
Event	Class	No.	Driver	Co-driver	Entrant	Car	Time	Difference	Points
10	1	39	(France) Nicolas Bernardi	(France) Denis Giraudet	(France) Renault Sport	Renault Clio S1600	4:35:41.1		10
12	2	32	(Estonia) Urmo Aava	(Estonia) Kuldar Sikk	(Japan) Suzuki Sport	Suzuki Ignis S1600	4:39:49.1	+4:08.0	8
14	3	36	(United Kingdom) Kris Meeke	(United Kingdom) Chris Patterson	(United Kingdom) McRae Motorsport	Opel Corsa S1600	4:43:15.6	+7:34.5	6
15	4	34	(San Marino) Alessandro Broccoli	(Italy) Giovanni Agnese	(San Marino) Sab Motorsport	Fiat Punto S1600	4:43:23.2	+7:42.1	5
16	5	51	(Belgium) Larry Cols	(Belgium) Filip Goddé	(France) Renault Sport	Renault Clio S1600	4:47:04.1	+11:23.0	4
17	6	31	(San Marino) Mirco Baldacci	(Italy) Giovanni Bernacchini	(Japan) Suzuki Sport	Suzuki Ignis S1600	4:47:53.9	+12:12.8	3
18	7	37	(Italy) Luca Cecchettini	(Italy) Nicola Arena	(Italy) Autorel Sport	Renault Clio S1600	4:59:14.6	+23:33.5	2
19	8	45	(Sweden) Per-Gunnar Andersson	(Sweden) Jonas Andersson	(Japan) Suzuki Sport	Suzuki Ignis S1600	5:01:22.5	+25:41.4	1
20	9	42	(France) Mathieu Biasion	(France) Philippe Coquard	(Italy) H.F. Grifone SRL	Fiat Punto S1600	5:04:54.4	+29:13.3	0
Retired SS12		43	(Finland) Jari-Matti Latvala	(Finland) Miikka Anttila	(Italy) Astra Racing	Ford Puma S1600	Accident		0
Retired SS11		35	(Finland) Kosti Katajamäki	(Finland) Timo Alanne	(Japan) Suzuki Sport	Suzuki Ignis S1600	Accident		0
Retired SS11		50	(United Kingdom) Oliver Marshall	(United Kingdom) Craig Parry	(United Kingdom) Prospeed Motorsport	Renault Clio S1600	Accident		0
Retired SS9		46	(Spain) Xavier Pons	(Spain) Oriol Julià Pascual	(Spain) RACC Motor Sport	Fiat Punto S1600	Accident		0
Retired SS9		47	(Italy) Luca Tabaton	(Italy) Gisella Rovegno	(Italy) H.F. Grifone SRL	Fiat Punto S1600	Accident		0
Retired SS7		40	(France) Guerlain Chicherit	(France) Michel Perin	(France) Citroën Total	Citroën Saxo S1600	Mechanical		0
Retired SS6		38	(Lebanon) Abdo Feghali	(Lebanon) Joseph Matar	(Italy) Astra Racing	Ford Puma S1600	Accident		0
Retired SS5		33	(United Kingdom) Guy Wilks	(United Kingdom) Phil Pugh	(Japan) Suzuki Sport	Suzuki Ignis S1600	Accident		0
Retired SS5		44	(Italy) Alan Scorcioni	(Italy) Massimo Daddoveri	(Italy) H.F. Grifone SRL	Fiat Punto S1600	Accident		0
Retired SS4		49	(Italy) Luca Betti	(Italy) Michele Rosso	(Italy) Meteco Corse	Peugeot 206 S1600	Mechanical		0
Retired SS3		41	(United Kingdom) Natalie Barratt	(United Kingdom) Carl Williamson	(United Kingdom) Risbridger Motorsport	MG ZR S1600	Mechanical		0
Retired SS3		10	(Zimbabwe) Conrad Rautenbach	(Zimbabwe) Peter Marsh	(United Kingdom) Birkbeck Rallysport	Ford Puma S1600	Accident		0

==== Special stages ====
Day	Stage	Stage name	Length	Winner	Car	Time	Class leaders
Leg 1 (23 Jan)	SS1	Selonnet — Bréziers 1	22.64 km	Stage cancelled			
Leg 1 (23 Jan)	SS2	Piégut — Urtis 1	20.18 km	(Sweden) Per-Gunnar Andersson	Suzuki Ignis S1600	19:40.7	(Sweden) Per-Gunnar Andersson
Leg 1 (23 Jan)	SS3	Selonnet — Bréziers 2	22.64 km	(Sweden) Per-Gunnar Andersson	Suzuki Ignis S1600	16:41.1	(Sweden) Per-Gunnar Andersson
Leg 1 (23 Jan)	SS4	Piégut — Urtis 2	20.18 km	(France) Nicolas Bernardi	Renault Clio S1600	18:05.2	(Sweden) Per-Gunnar Andersson
Leg 1 (23 Jan)	SS5	Laborel — L'Aubergerie	26.68 km	(Estonia) Urmo Aava	Suzuki Ignis S1600	20:11.7	(Estonia) Urmo Aava
Leg 1 (23 Jan)	SS6	Rosans — L'Epine	31.81 km	(Finland) Kosti Katajamäki	Suzuki Ignis S1600	20:14.0	(Finland) Kosti Katajamäki
Leg 2 (24 Jan)	SS7	Lantosque — Col de Braus	34.41 km	Notional stage time			(Finland) Kosti Katajamäki
Leg 2 (24 Jan)	SS8	Tourette du Château — St Antonin 1	24.80 km	(United Kingdom) Kris Meeke	Opel Corsa S1600	20:10.5	(Estonia) Urmo Aava
Leg 2 (24 Jan)	SS9	Sigale — Col de Bleine 1	28.39 km	(France) Nicolas Bernardi	Renault Clio S1600	21:51.8	(France) Nicolas Bernardi
Leg 2 (24 Jan)	SS10	Tourette du Château — St Antonin 2	24.80 km	Stage cancelled			(France) Nicolas Bernardi
Leg 2 (24 Jan)	SS11	Sigale — Col de Bleine 2	28.39 km	(San Marino) Mirco Baldacci	Suzuki Ignis S1600	22:56.6	(France) Nicolas Bernardi
Leg 3 (25 Jan)	SS12	Sospel — Turini — La Bollène 1	32.58 km	(France) Nicolas Bernardi	Renault Clio S1600	27:10.5	(France) Nicolas Bernardi
Leg 3 (25 Jan)	SS13	Lantosque — Lucéram 1	19.52 km	(France) Nicolas Bernardi	Renault Clio S1600	15:28.4	(France) Nicolas Bernardi
Leg 3 (25 Jan)	SS14	Sospel — Turini — La Bollène 2	32.58 km	(Belgium) Larry Cols	Renault Clio S1600	26:37.4	(France) Nicolas Bernardi
Leg 3 (25 Jan)	SS15	Lantosque — Lucéram 2	19.52 km	(Belgium) Larry Cols	Renault Clio S1600	15:12.0	(France) Nicolas Bernardi

==== Championship standings ====
Pos.	Drivers' championships		
Pos.	Move	Driver	Points
1	New entry	(France) Nicolas Bernardi	10
2	New entry	(Estonia) Urmo Aava	8
3	New entry	(United Kingdom) Kris Meeke	6
4	New entry	(San Marino) Alessandro Broccoli	5
5	New entry	(Belgium) Larry Cols	4
