= 2005 Rally New Zealand =

4th round of the 2005 World Rally Championship

2005 Rally New Zealand 36th Propecia Rally New Zealand
Round 4 of the 2005 World Rally Championship season
← Previous event	Next event →
- Host country: New Zealand
- Rally base: Auckland
- Dates run: April 8, 2005 – April 10, 2005
- Stages: 20 (356 km; 221 miles)
- Stage surface: Gravel
- Overall distance: 1,128.48 km (701.20 miles)

Statistics
- Crews: 69 at start, 42 at finish

Overall results
- Overall winner: (France) Sébastien Loeb (Monaco) Daniel Elena (France) Citroën Total WRT; Citroën Xsara WRC

The 2005 Rally New Zealand (formally the 36th Propecia Rally New Zealand) was the fourth round of the 2005 World Rally Championship. The rally was held over three days between 8 April and 10 April 2005, and was won by Citroën's Sébastien Loeb, his 12th win in the World Rally Championship.

== Background ==
=== Entry list ===
No.	Driver	Co-Driver	Entrant	Car	Tyre
World Rally Championship manufacturer entries
1	(France) Sébastien Loeb	(Monaco) Daniel Elena	(France) Citroën Total WRT	Citroën Xsara WRC	M
2	(Belgium) François Duval	(Belgium) Stéphane Prévot	(France) Citroën Total WRT	Citroën Xsara WRC	M
3	(Finland) Toni Gardemeister	(Finland) Jakke Honkanen	(United Kingdom) BP Ford World Rally Team	Ford Focus RS WRC '04	M
4	(Czech Republic) Roman Kresta	(Czech Republic) Jan Možný	(United Kingdom) BP Ford World Rally Team	Ford Focus RS WRC '04	M
5	(Norway) Petter Solberg	(United Kingdom) Phil Mills	(Japan) Subaru World Rally Team	Subaru Impreza S11 WRC '05	P
6	(Australia) Chris Atkinson	(Australia) Glenn Macneall	(Japan) Subaru World Rally Team	Subaru Impreza S11 WRC '05	P
7	(Finland) Marcus Grönholm	(Finland) Timo Rautiainen	(France) Marlboro Peugeot Total	Peugeot 307 WRC	P
8	(Estonia) Markko Märtin	(United Kingdom) Michael Park	(France) Marlboro Peugeot Total	Peugeot 307 WRC	P
9	(Finland) Harri Rovanperä	(Finland) Risto Pietiläinen	(Japan) Mitsubishi Motors	Mitsubishi Lancer WRC 05	P
10	(Italy) Gianluigi Galli	(Italy) Guido D'Amore	(Japan) Mitsubishi Motors	Mitsubishi Lancer WRC 05	P
11	(Germany) Armin Schwarz	(Germany) Klaus Wicha	(Czech Republic) Škoda Motorsport	Škoda Fabia WRC	M
12	(Finland) Janne Tuohino	(Finland) Mikko Markkula	(Czech Republic) Škoda Motorsport	Škoda Fabia WRC	M
World Rally Championship entries
14	(Austria) Manfred Stohl	(Austria) Ilka Minor	(Belgium) OMV World Rally Team	Citroën Xsara WRC	M
15	(Argentina) Luis Pérez Companc	(Argentina) Jose Maria Volta	(United Kingdom) BP Ford World Rally Team	Ford Focus RS WRC '04	M
17	(Germany) Antony Warmbold	(United Kingdom) Michael Orr	(United Kingdom) BP Ford World Rally Team	Ford Focus RS WRC '04	M
79	(New Zealand) Malcolm Stewart	(New Zealand) Mike Fletcher	(New Zealand) Malcolm Stewart	Mitsubishi Lancer Evo 6.5	—N/a
83	(New Zealand) Kevin Honiss	(New Zealand) Malcolm Peden	(New Zealand) Kevin Honiss	Subaru Impreza WRX STI	—N/a
95	(Japan) Junji Shimizu	(Japan) Yoshinori Kuwahara	(Japan) Teraoka Auto Door	Subaru Impreza WRX	—N/a
PWRC entries
31	(Japan) Toshihiro Arai	(New Zealand) Tony Sircombe	(United Kingdom) Subaru Team Arai	Subaru Impreza STI N11	P
32	(Spain) Xavier Pons	(Spain) Oriol Julià Pascual	(Spain) Xavier Pons	Mitsubishi Lancer Evo VIII	M
33	(Qatar) Nasser Al-Attiyah	(United Kingdom) Chris Patterson	(Qatar) Nasser Al-Attiyah	Subaru Impreza STI N11 Spec C	—N/a
34	(Japan) Fumio Nutahara	(Japan) Satoshi Hayashi	(Japan) Advan-Piaa Rally Team	Mitsubishi Lancer Evo VIII	Y
35	(Malaysia) Karamjit Singh	(United Kingdom) John Bennie	Proton Pert Malaysia	Proton Pert Evo VII	—N/a
36	(Argentina) Marcos Ligato	(Argentina) Rubén García	Subaru Argentina Rally Team	Subaru Impreza STI N11	—N/a
37	(United Kingdom) Mark Higgins	(United Kingdom) Trevor Agnew	(United Kingdom) Mark Higgins	Subaru Impreza STI N11	P
40	(Argentina) Gabriel Pozzo	(Argentina) Daniel Stillo	Subaru Argentina Rally Team	Subaru Impreza STI N11	—N/a
41	(United Kingdom) Natalie Barratt	(United Kingdom) Carl Williamson	(Belgium) OMV World Rally Team	Mitsubishi Lancer Evo VII	P
42	(Argentina) Federico Villagra	(Argentina) Javier Villagra	(Argentina) Federico Villagra	Mitsubishi Lancer Evo VIII	S
43	(Italy) Angelo Medeghini	(Italy) Barbara Capoferri	(Italy) Angelo Medeghini	Mitsubishi Lancer Evo VIII	P
44	(Argentina) Sebastián Beltrán	(Argentina) Edgardo Galindo	Subaru Argentina Rally Team	Subaru Impreza STI N11	—N/a
47	(Paraguay) Marcelo Recanate	(Paraguay) Víctor Federer	(Paraguay) Marcelo Recanate	Mitsubishi Lancer Evo VII	—N/a
48	(Chile) Luis Ignacio Rosselot	(Chile) Ricardo Rojas	(Chile) Luis Ignacio Rosselot	Mitsubishi Lancer Evo VIII	—N/a
49	(Oman) Hamed Al-Wahaibi	(United Kingdom) David Senior	Oman Arab World Rally Team	Subaru Impreza STI Spec C	—N/a
50	(Finland) Aki Teiskonen	(Finland) Miika Teiskonen	(Japan) Syms Rally Team	Subaru Impreza STI	—N/a
51	(France) Brice Tirabassi	(France) Mathieu Baumel	(France) Brice Tirabassi	Subaru Impreza STI N11	—N/a

=== Itinerary ===
All dates and times are NZST (UTC+12).

Date	Time	No.	Stage name	Distance
1. leg — 129.22 km
8 April	09:53	SS1	Parahi	25.33 km
8 April	10:46	SS2	Batley 1	19.33 km
8 April	11:14	SS3	Waipu Gorge 1	11.24 km
8 April	11:37	SS4	Brooks 1	16.15 km
8 April	13:33	SS5	Batley 2	19.33 km
8 April	14:01	SS6	Waipu Gorge 2	11.24 km
8 April	14:24	SS7	Brooks 2	16.15 km
8 April	14:54	SS8	Millbrook	10.45 km
2. leg — 139.49 km
9 April	09:23	SS9	Wairere	18.92 km
9 April	10:01	SS10	Cassidy 1	15.78 km
9 April	10:24	SS11	Bull 1	31.73 km
9 April	13:03	SS12	Waipu Caves	21.35 km
9 April	13:39	SS13	Cassidy 2	15.78 km
9 April	14:02	SS14	Bull 2	31.73 km
9 April	19:30	SS15	Manukau Super 1	2.10 km
9 April	19:51	SS16	Manukau Super 2	2.10 km
3. leg — 87.29 km
10 April	09:03	SS17	Te Hutewai	11.15 km
10 April	09:26	SS18	Whaanga Coast 1	29.76 km
10 April	11:03	SS19	Te Papatapu	16.62 km
10 April	11:36	SS20	Whaanga Coast 2	29.76 km

== Results ==
=== Overall ===
Pos.	No.	Driver	Co-driver	Team	Car	Time	Difference	Points
1	1	(France) Sébastien Loeb	(Monaco) Daniel Elena	(France) Citroën Total WRT	Citroën Xsara WRC	3:34:51.6		10
2	7	(Finland) Marcus Grönholm	(Finland) Timo Rautiainen	(France) Marlboro Peugeot Total	Peugeot 307 WRC	3:35:41.4	+49.8	8
3	5	(Norway) Petter Solberg	(United Kingdom) Phil Mills	(Japan) Subaru World Rally Team	Subaru Impreza S11 WRC '05	3:36:00.3	+1:08.7	6
4	2	(Belgium) François Duval	(Belgium) Stéphane Prévot	(France) Citroën Total WRT	Citroën Xsara WRC	3:36:57.9	+2:06.3	5
5	8	(Estonia) Markko Märtin	(United Kingdom) Michael Park	(France) Marlboro Peugeot Total	Peugeot 307 WRC	3:38:00.7	+3:09.1	4
6	3	(Finland) Toni Gardemeister	(Finland) Jakke Honkanen	(United Kingdom) BP Ford World Rally Team	Ford Focus RS WRC '04	3:38:07.9	+3:16.3	3
7	6	(Australia) Chris Atkinson	(Australia) Glenn Macneall	(Japan) Subaru World Rally Team	Subaru Impreza S11 WRC '05	3:39:28.8	+4:37.2	2
8	10	(Italy) Gianluigi Galli	(Italy) Guido D'Amore	(Japan) Mitsubishi Motors	Mitsubishi Lancer WRC 05	3:41:42.1	+6:50.5	1

=== World Rally Cars ===
==== Classification ====
Position		No.	Driver	Co-driver	Entrant	Car	Time	Difference	Points
Event	Class	No.	Driver	Co-driver	Entrant	Car	Time	Difference	Points
1	1	1	(France) Sébastien Loeb	(Monaco) Daniel Elena	(France) Citroën Total WRT	Citroën Xsara WRC	3:34:51.6		10
2	2	7	(Finland) Marcus Grönholm	(Finland) Timo Rautiainen	(France) Marlboro Peugeot Total	Peugeot 307 WRC	3:35:41.4	+49.8	8
3	3	5	(Norway) Petter Solberg	(United Kingdom) Phil Mills	(Japan) Subaru World Rally Team	Subaru Impreza S11 WRC '05	3:36:00.3	+1:08.7	6
4	4	2	(Belgium) François Duval	(Belgium) Stéphane Prévot	(France) Citroën Total WRT	Citroën Xsara WRC	3:36:57.9	+2:06.3	5
5	5	8	(Estonia) Markko Märtin	(United Kingdom) Michael Park	(France) Marlboro Peugeot Total	Peugeot 307 WRC	3:38:00.7	+3:09.1	4
6	6	3	(Finland) Toni Gardemeister	(Finland) Jakke Honkanen	(United Kingdom) BP Ford World Rally Team	Ford Focus RS WRC '04	3:38:07.9	+3:16.3	3
7	7	6	(Australia) Chris Atkinson	(Australia) Glenn Macneall	(Japan) Subaru World Rally Team	Subaru Impreza S11 WRC '05	3:39:28.8	+4:37.2	2
8	8	10	(Italy) Gianluigi Galli	(Italy) Guido D'Amore	(Japan) Mitsubishi Motors	Mitsubishi Lancer WRC 05	3:41:42.1	+6:50.5	1
10	9	11	(Germany) Armin Schwarz	(Germany) Klaus Wicha	(Czech Republic) Škoda Motorsport	Škoda Fabia WRC	3:45:09.6	+10:18.0	0
Retired SS20		9	(Finland) Harri Rovanperä	(Finland) Risto Pietiläinen	(Japan) Mitsubishi Motors	Mitsubishi Lancer WRC 05	Mechanical		0
Retired SS18		12	(Finland) Janne Tuohino	(Finland) Mikko Markkula	(Czech Republic) Škoda Motorsport	Škoda Fabia WRC	Mechanical		0
Retired SS1		4	(Czech Republic) Roman Kresta	(Czech Republic) Jan Možný	(United Kingdom) BP Ford World Rally Team	Ford Focus RS WRC '04	Shakedown accident		0

==== Special stages ====
Day	Stage	Stage name	Length	Winner	Car	Time	Class leaders
1. leg (8 Apr)	SS1	Parahi	25.33 km	(Norway) Petter Solberg	Subaru Impreza S11 WRC '05	12:59.5	(Norway) Petter Solberg
1. leg (8 Apr)	SS2	Batley 1	19.33 km	(Finland) Marcus Grönholm	Peugeot 307 WRC	10:30.7	(Norway) Petter Solberg
1. leg (8 Apr)	SS3	Waipu Gorge 1	11.24 km	(Australia) Chris Atkinson	Subaru Impreza S11 WRC '05	6:40.0	(Norway) Petter Solberg
1. leg (8 Apr)	SS4	Brooks 1	16.15 km	(Finland) Marcus Grönholm	Peugeot 307 WRC	9:45.0	(France) Sébastien Loeb
1. leg (8 Apr)	SS5	Batley 2	19.33 km	(France) Sébastien Loeb	Citroën Xsara WRC	10:11.0	(France) Sébastien Loeb
1. leg (8 Apr)	SS6	Waipu Gorge 2	11.24 km	(France) Sébastien Loeb	Citroën Xsara WRC	6:22.5	(France) Sébastien Loeb
1. leg (8 Apr)	SS7	Brooks 2	16.15 km	(France) Sébastien Loeb	Citroën Xsara WRC	9:17.7	(France) Sébastien Loeb
1. leg (8 Apr)	SS8	Millbrook	10.45 km	(Australia) Chris Atkinson	Subaru Impreza S11 WRC '05	6:02.5	(France) Sébastien Loeb
2. leg (9 Apr)	SS9	Wairere	18.92 km	(France) Sébastien Loeb	Citroën Xsara WRC	10:21.9	(France) Sébastien Loeb
2. leg (9 Apr)	SS10	Cassidy 1	15.78 km	(France) Sébastien Loeb	Citroën Xsara WRC	9:07.3	(France) Sébastien Loeb
2. leg (9 Apr)	SS11	Bull 1	31.73 km	(Norway) Petter Solberg	Subaru Impreza S11 WRC '05	19:36.3	(France) Sébastien Loeb
2. leg (9 Apr)	SS12	Waipu Caves	21.35 km	(Norway) Petter Solberg	Subaru Impreza S11 WRC '05	11:39.5	(France) Sébastien Loeb
2. leg (9 Apr)	SS13	Cassidy 2	15.78 km	(France) Sébastien Loeb	Citroën Xsara WRC	8:54.2	(France) Sébastien Loeb
2. leg (9 Apr)	SS14	Bull 2	31.73 km	(France) Sébastien Loeb	Citroën Xsara WRC	18:58.7	(France) Sébastien Loeb
2. leg (9 Apr)	SS15	Manukau Super 1	2.10 km	(Norway) Petter Solberg	Subaru Impreza S11 WRC '05	1:23.5	(France) Sébastien Loeb
2. leg (9 Apr)	SS16	Manukau Super 2	2.10 km	(Finland) Marcus Grönholm	Peugeot 307 WRC	1:23.9	(France) Sébastien Loeb
3. leg (10 Apr)	SS17	Te Hutewai	11.15 km	(Finland) Marcus Grönholm	Peugeot 307 WRC	7:55.6	(France) Sébastien Loeb
3. leg (10 Apr)	SS18	Whaanga Coast 1	29.76 km	(Finland) Marcus Grönholm	Peugeot 307 WRC	21:31.8	(France) Sébastien Loeb
3. leg (10 Apr)	SS19	Te Papatapu	16.62 km	(Finland) Marcus Grönholm	Peugeot 307 WRC	10:51.3	(France) Sébastien Loeb
3. leg (10 Apr)	SS20	Whaanga Coast 2	29.76 km	(France) Sébastien Loeb	Citroën Xsara WRC	20:44.7	(France) Sébastien Loeb

==== Championship standings ====
Pos.	Drivers' championships			Co-drivers' championships			Manufacturers' championships		
Pos.	Move	Driver	Points	Move	Co-driver	Points	Move	Manufacturer	Points
1		(Norway) Petter Solberg	26		(United Kingdom) Phil Mills	26		(France) Marlboro Peugeot Total	43
2	2	(France) Sébastien Loeb	25	2	(Monaco) Daniel Elena	25	3	(France) Citroën Total WRT	31
3	1	(Estonia) Markko Märtin	23	1	(United Kingdom) Michael Park	23	1	(Japan) Subaru World Rally Team	28
4	1	(Finland) Marcus Grönholm	20	1	(Finland) Timo Rautiainen	20	2	(United Kingdom) BP Ford World Rally Team	26
5	2	(Finland) Toni Gardemeister	20	2	(Finland) Jakke Honkanen	20	2	(Japan) Mitsubishi Motors	24

=== Production World Rally Championship ===
==== Classification ====
Position		No.	Driver	Co-driver	Entrant	Car	Time	Difference	Points
Event	Class	No.	Driver	Co-driver	Entrant	Car	Time	Difference	Points
13	1	32	(Spain) Xavier Pons	(Spain) Oriol Julià Pascual	(Spain) Xevi Pons	Mitsubishi Lancer Evo VIII	3:50:00.3		10
14	2	31	(Japan) Toshihiro Arai	(New Zealand) Tony Sircombe	(United Kingdom) Subaru Team Arai	Subaru Impreza STI N11	3:50:17.3	+17.0	8
15	3	36	(Argentina) Marcos Ligato	(Argentina) Rubén García	Subaru Argentina Rally Team	Subaru Impreza STI N11	3:50:55.4	+55.1	6
16	4	33	(Qatar) Nasser Al-Attiyah	(United Kingdom) Chris Patterson	(Qatar) Nasser Al-Attiyah	Subaru Impreza STI N11 Spec C	3:50:57.5	+57.2	5
18	5	35	(Malaysia) Karamjit Singh	(United Kingdom) John Bennie	Proton Pert Malaysia	Proton Pert Evo VII	3:53:58.7	+3:58.4	4
19	6	42	(Argentina) Federico Villagra	(Argentina) Javier Villagra	(Argentina) Federico Villagra	Mitsubishi Lancer Evo VIII	3:55:32.8	+5:32.5	3
20	7	34	(Japan) Fumio Nutahara	(Japan) Satoshi Hayashi	(Japan) Advan-Piaa Rally Team	Mitsubishi Lancer Evo VIII	3:56:20.5	+6:20.2	2
21	8	49	(Oman) Hamed Al-Wahaibi	(United Kingdom) David Senior	Oman Arab World Rally Team	Subaru Impreza STI Spec C	3:56:44.0	+6:43.7	1
23	9	51	(France) Brice Tirabassi	(France) Mathieu Baumel	(France) Brice Tirabassi	Subaru Impreza STI N11	3:57:14.3	+7:14.0	0
24	10	44	(Argentina) Sebastián Beltrán	(Argentina) Edgardo Galindo	Subaru Argentina Rally Team	Subaru Impreza STI N11	3:57:23.4	+7:23.1	0
30	11	48	(Chile) Luis Ignacio Rosselot	(Chile) Ricardo Rojas	(Chile) Luis Ignacio Rosselot	Mitsubishi Lancer Evo VIII	4:07:56.1	+17:55.8	0
37	12	41	(United Kingdom) Natalie Barratt	(United Kingdom) Carl Williamson	(Belgium) OMV World Rally Team	Mitsubishi Lancer Evo VII	4:23:01.6	+33:01.3	0
41	13	47	(Paraguay) Marcelo Recanate	(Paraguay) Víctor Federer	(Paraguay) Marcelo Recanate	Mitsubishi Lancer Evo VII	4:38:28.7	+48:28.4	0
Retired SS20		37	(United Kingdom) Mark Higgins	(United Kingdom) Trevor Agnew	(United Kingdom) Mark Higgins	Subaru Impreza STI N11	Fuel pump		0
Retired SS20		40	(Argentina) Gabriel Pozzo	(Argentina) Daniel Stillo	Subaru Argentina Rally Team	Subaru Impreza STI N11	Brakes		0
Retired SS17		43	(Italy) Angelo Medeghini	(Italy) Barbara Capoferri	(Italy) Angelo Medeghini	Mitsubishi Lancer Evo VIII	Driver ill		0
Retired SS7		50	(Finland) Aki Teiskonen	(Finland) Miika Teiskonen	(Japan) Syms Rally Team	Subaru Impreza STI	Engine		0

==== Special stages ====
Day	Stage	Stage name	Length	Winner	Car	Time	Class leaders
1. leg (8 Apr)	SS1	Parahi	25.33 km	(Japan) Toshihiro Arai	Subaru Impreza STI N11	13:54.5	(Japan) Toshihiro Arai
1. leg (8 Apr)	SS2	Batley 1	19.33 km	(Japan) Toshihiro Arai	Subaru Impreza STI N11	11:09.1	(Japan) Toshihiro Arai
1. leg (8 Apr)	SS3	Waipu Gorge 1	11.24 km	(Japan) Toshihiro Arai	Subaru Impreza STI N11	6:59.0	(Japan) Toshihiro Arai
1. leg (8 Apr)	SS4	Brooks 1	16.15 km	(Japan) Toshihiro Arai	Subaru Impreza STI N11	10:12.7	(Japan) Toshihiro Arai
1. leg (8 Apr)	SS5	Batley 2	19.33 km	(Argentina) Marcos Ligato	Subaru Impreza STI N11	11:00.0	(Japan) Toshihiro Arai
1. leg (8 Apr)	SS6	Waipu Gorge 2	11.24 km	(Argentina) Gabriel Pozzo	Subaru Impreza STI N11	6:53.9	(Japan) Toshihiro Arai
1. leg (8 Apr)	SS7	Brooks 2	16.15 km	(Argentina) Gabriel Pozzo	Subaru Impreza STI N11	10:03.8	(Japan) Toshihiro Arai
1. leg (8 Apr)	SS8	Millbrook	10.45 km	(Argentina) Gabriel Pozzo	Subaru Impreza STI N11	6:20.4	(Japan) Toshihiro Arai
2. leg (9 Apr)	SS9	Wairere	18.92 km	(Spain) Xavier Pons	Mitsubishi Lancer Evo VIII	11:15.1	(Japan) Toshihiro Arai
2. leg (9 Apr)	SS10	Cassidy 1	15.78 km	(Japan) Toshihiro Arai (United Kingdom) Mark Higgins	Subaru Impreza STI N11; Subaru Impreza STI N11	9:45.8	(Japan) Toshihiro Arai
2. leg (9 Apr)	SS11	Bull 1	31.73 km	(Qatar) Nasser Al-Attiyah	Subaru Impreza STI N11 Spec C	20:55.7	(Japan) Toshihiro Arai
2. leg (9 Apr)	SS12	Waipu Caves	21.35 km	(Spain) Xavier Pons	Mitsubishi Lancer Evo VIII	12:32.3	(Japan) Toshihiro Arai
2. leg (9 Apr)	SS13	Cassidy 2	15.78 km	(Spain) Xavier Pons	Mitsubishi Lancer Evo VIII	9:38.0	(Japan) Toshihiro Arai
2. leg (9 Apr)	SS14	Bull 2	31.73 km	(Spain) Xavier Pons	Mitsubishi Lancer Evo VIII	20:30.6	(Spain) Xavier Pons
2. leg (9 Apr)	SS15	Manukau Super 1	2.10 km	(Japan) Toshihiro Arai	Subaru Impreza STI N11	1:30.8	(Spain) Xavier Pons
2. leg (9 Apr)	SS16	Manukau Super 2	2.10 km	(Japan) Toshihiro Arai	Subaru Impreza STI N11	1:30.7	(Spain) Xavier Pons
3. leg (10 Apr)	SS17	Te Hutewai	11.15 km	(Japan) Toshihiro Arai	Subaru Impreza STI N11	8:16.9	(Spain) Xavier Pons
3. leg (10 Apr)	SS18	Whaanga Coast 1	29.76 km	(Japan) Toshihiro Arai	Subaru Impreza STI N11	22:29.8	(Japan) Toshihiro Arai
3. leg (10 Apr)	SS19	Te Papatapu	16.62 km	(Argentina) Marcos Ligato	Subaru Impreza STI N11	11:32.2	(Japan) Toshihiro Arai
3. leg (10 Apr)	SS20	Whaanga Coast 2	29.76 km	(Spain) Xavier Pons	Mitsubishi Lancer Evo VIII	21:56.5	(Spain) Xavier Pons

==== Championship standings ====
Pos.	Drivers' championships		
Pos.	Move	Driver	Points
1		(Japan) Toshihiro Arai	18
2	2	(Spain) Xavier Pons	15
3	1	(Italy) Angelo Medeghini	8
4	1	(Italy) Fabio Frisiero	6
5	New entry	(Argentina) Marcos Ligato	6
