= French Federation of Automobile Sport =

- Sport: Motorsport
- Jurisdiction: France
- Abbreviation: FFSA
- Founded: 1952
- Affiliation: FIA
- Headquarters: Paris
- President: Nicolas Deschaux

Official website
- www.ffsa.org
- (France)

French Federation of Automobile Sport (French: Fédération Française du Sport Automobile, FFSA), founded in 1952, is one of the National Sports Associations affiliated to the Fédération Internationale de l'Automobile (FIA), with the aim of organising, regulating and developing motorsport in France.

By representing the government on the field, the FFSA guarantees the political development of automobile sport and karting in France.

There are presently 56,000 registered members, registered through 432 automobile clubs (218 main clubs; 214 karting clubs). There are some 350 approved circuits, of which 120 are designed for road racing, and 280 karting tracks.

The FFSA is managed by a Management Committee of 30 members elected for 4 years. The president of the FFSA is selected among the members of the Management Committee.

== The Organisation ==
The FFSA is made of a structural associative layer formed by 21 Regional Committees of Automobile Sports and 18 Regional Committees of Karting.

Each one of these structures is made of Automobile Sports Associations (ASA) and Karting Sports Associations (ASK), which give out the licenses and assure the technical and administrative organization written in the federal calendar.

Presided by Nicolas DESCHAUX, the federation is governed by an Executive Bureau made of 8 members, all of them coming from the Directive Committee which is made of 30 elected members mandated for four years.

Based at 32, Avenue de New-York in Paris, France, the head offices welcome different poles of activities underneath a General Director.

== FFSA in Numbers ==
56 000 licensees in automobile sport and karting

39 regional structures (21 Regional Committees of Automobile Sports and 18 Regional Committees of Karting)

400 Automobile / Karting Sports Associations

350 Automobile and karting tracks all over France

34 French Karting Schools in France

1 100 competitions a year in France

3 French National Teams (Circuit, Karting and Rally)

7 fields of automobile: Rally, Circuit, Mountain, All-Road, Karting, Historical Vehicles (VHC) and Drift

== FFSA's fields of Competition ==
Rally: This discipline dominates the French automobile sport with over 250 competitions on the calendar every season and more than 15 000 participants (licensees and officials). The Rally is seen on all types of roads (asphalt, dirt roads, unpaved roads), is open to all categories of certified cars (nationally and internationally), and is noticed thanks to its strong visibility and popularity. From the European competitions to the regional ones, the Rally has an important media coverage with: France Rally Championship, France Dirt Rally Championship, and the France Asphalt Rally Cup. Concerning the unpaved roads there are the France All-Roads Rally Championship and the Bajas.

Circuit: Just like all the other disciplines organized by the FFSA, there are multiple and different types of competition opportunities on Circuit. Open for everyone, all ages, and all types of cars and single-seater cars, the discipline is practiced through six series of events: The GT Tour FFSA, the French Circuit Cup, The French Historical Circuits Championship, The Clubs Courses, The French Truck Cup, The French Championship and all-roads endurance competitions and the SSV French Cup.

All-Roads: Major component of the FFSA competitions, the all-road has multiple faces to which many drivers turn to. Many competitions make up this discipline: The French Rallycross Championship, The French Auto-Cross and Sprint Car Championship, The French Flo'Car Cup, The French Truck Cross, the French 2CV Cross Cup and the competitions on ice.

VHC: Competition, sport regulations and other regulations make the three components of the sports activities offered by the FFSA to the owners of vintage cars. The Rally, the Circuit, the Mountain and the All-roads are directly concerned. We find the French Rally Championship VHC, the Historical regulation Rally, the French VHC Mountain Championship, the Historical Slalom and the Endurance 4x4, etc.

Drift: This discipline, is practiced mostly by youngsters, combines fun with an idea of freedom, combining speed, angles and precision.

Karting: Including in 2000 to the automobile sport, the organization of Karting competitions is characterized by different types of competitions including a few French Championship and French Cup. This discipline is practiced by many young drivers, the Karting is often considered a way to attain the automobile sport.

Mountain: This discipline contains over 130 races uphill for the happiness of all licensees and officials every season. Going from 4 to 6 kilometers long, the stages of the French Mountain Championship show the biggest rush in terms of spectators. To complete the championship, the FFSA organize de French Mountain Cup, The French Slalom Cup as well as speeding and dragsters disciplines.

== Key events and important competitions ==
=== French Rally Championship ===
Organized since 1967, the French Championship is a major motorsport competition in Europe. On top of being open to every categories of car, this competition allows the licensees to express their talents fully. For example, the under 25 years old, the women and the amateurs are framed to participate to specific trophies. These ones reveal young drivers who will then try their luck at the World Rally Championship.

The French Dirt Rally Championship is the other competition organized for the drivers who are not specialized on asphalt. It lasts two days.

=== French Circuits Championship ===
The GT Tour – or French Circuits FFSA Championship – is organized by the firm that also insure its media coverage. This championship unite various series on circuit: the French FFSA GT Cup and Championship, the French F4 Championship, the French Supertourism Championship, the French Porsche Carrera Cup, the Peugeot RCZ Racing Cup, the Mitjet or the French Renault Clio Cup.

=== Rally of France ===
Planned on the FIA World Rally Championship calendar since its creation in 1973, the Rally of France was only based on two territories in more than 40 years: Corse (from 1975 to 2008 and 2015 to now) and the Alsace (from 2010 to 2014): Since 2015, the Rally of France is back in Corse, thus its name "Tour de Corse".

Very long, testing for the mechanics as well as for the drivers, the "Tour de Corse", travels around the entire Beauty Island and goes through Bastia, Propriano, Corte, Porto Vecchio to finish in Ajaccio.

== Auto Sport Academy ==
Located in Le Mans, the Auto Sport Academy was created in 1993, it is the FFSA's training facility that prepares to the job of being an automobile driver, being a competition car mechanic or driver's instructor. Foreseeing, training and promoting are key words for the federal institution. The Auto Sport Academy is now an international reference for the learning of jobs related to the automobile sports and an advantage for the French automobile.

== See also ==
- GT Tour
  - FFSA GT Championship
