= 2002 SCCA ProRally season =

2002 SCCA ProRally

Seasons
- ← 2001 2003 →

The 2002 SCCA ProRally Season was the 30th season of the SCCA ProRally and won by Manxman David Higgins, who beat elder brother Mark, and title defender Mark Lovell in a British 1-2-3. Ten rounds were held from January 2002 to October 2002. The co-driver title went to Lovell's co-driver Steve Turvey because David Higgins had Calvin Cooledge, Chris Patterson and Daniel Barritt whilst Mark Higgins had Michael Gibson, Claire Mole and Bryan Thomas and Turvey scored more points. The manufacturer's title went to Hyundai.

== Teams and drivers ==
Constructor	Car	No.	Driver	Rounds
Subaru	Subaru Impreza WRX	1	Mark Lovell	All
Subaru	Subaru Impreza WRX	2	Ramana Lagemann	All
Subaru	Subaru Impreza WRX	16	David Higgins	1–5, 7-10
Subaru	Subaru Impreza WRX	61	Karl Scheible	4-5
Mitsubishi	Mitsubishi Lancer Evo VII	3	Rhys Millen	6-10
Mitsubishi	Mitsubishi Lancer Evo VII	18	Janusz Kulig	2
Hyundai	Hyundai Tiburon	5	Mark Higgins	All
Hyundai	Hyundai Tiburon	6	Paul Choiniere	All
Hyundai	Hyundai Elantra	87	Frank Sprongl	1

== Calendar ==
1. Sno*Drift Rally won by Frank Sprongl
2. Cherokee Trails won by David Higgins
3. Oregon Trail ProRally won by David Higgins
4. Rim of the World ProRally won by David Higgins
5. Susquehannock Trail ProRally won by David Higgins
6. Falken Tire Pikes Peak International Hillclimb won by Mark Lovell
7. Maine Forest Rally won by Mark Lovell
8. Ojibwe Forests Rally won by Mark Higgins
9. Wild West International ProRally won by Rhys Millen
10. Lake Superior ProRally won by Mark Higgins

== Standings ==
Pos.	Driver	Pts.
1	(United Kingdom) David Higgins	133
2	(United Kingdom) Mark Higgins	111
3	(United Kingdom) Mark Lovell	104
4	(United States) Paul Choiniere	69
5	(New Zealand) Rhys Millen	64
6	(United States) Ramana Lagemann	55
7	(United States) Mark Nelson	41
8	(United States) Tim O'Neil	35
9	(United States) Ralph Kosmides	33
10	(Republic of Ireland) Seamus Burke	31
11	(United States) Lauchlan O'Sullivan	26
12	(United States) Doug Havir	24
13	(United States) Doug Shepherd	23
14	(United States) Craig Peeper	19
15	(United States) Eric Burmeister	17
