= Mount Washington Hillclimb Auto Race =

American timed hillclimb auto race

Coordinates: 44°17′17″N 71°16′45″W

The Mount Washington Hillclimb Auto Race, also known as the Climb to the Clouds, is a timed hillclimb auto race up the Mount Washington Auto Road to the summit of Mount Washington in New Hampshire. The track measures 7.6 miles (12.2 km), climbing 4,650 ft (1,417 m) from the start to the finish at 6288 ft (1,917 m), on grades averaging 12% with a maximum of 22%. It is one of the oldest auto races in the country, first run on July 11 and 12, 1904, predating the Indianapolis 500 and the Pikes Peak Hill Climb. The event was revived in 2011 and was held again in 2014 and 2017.

== History ==
The Mount Washington Hill Climb Auto Race was held off and on from 1904 to 1961, then not again until 1990, when Howie Wemyss, manager of the Auto Road, Robert Brotherus, a Finnish rally driver, and 11-time Sports Car Club of America (SCCA) ProRally champion, John Buffum, brought the race back.

Originally created by early auto manufacturers to showcase their vehicles, the Auto Road was chosen to prove the ability of these "horseless carriages". The inaugural "Climb to the Clouds" featured many makes of cars including Rambler, Mercedes, Oldsmobile, Stanley Steamer, Pierce, and a single Daimler, which were placed in categories based on their price. Although the Daimler and the Stanley Steamer driven by F. E. Stanley were favored, Harry Harkness drove to victory in a Mercedes, which ascended the 7.4-mile (11.9 km) course in 24 minutes, 37 seconds. This was quite impressive compared to the 2 hours, 10 minutes it took the first automobile to climb the Auto Road in 1899, a Stanley Locomobile. The course runs from an altitude of 1,604 feet (489 m) at Glen House to 6,260 feet (1,908 m) at the summit, for an average gradient of 11.8%.

The event was won by Erwin "Cannonball" Baker in 1928 with a time of 14 minutes, 49.6 seconds, driving a Franklin. Ab Jenkins won in 1930. Baker won again in 1932. Carroll Shelby drove a specially prepared Ferrari roadster to a record run of 10 minutes 21.8 seconds on his way to victory in 1956. In 1961, Bill Rutan drove a Porsche Carrera-powered Volkswagen to set a record time of 9:13.0, which stood until the race returned in 1990. Upon the race's return, Tim O'Neil set a time of 7:45, driving a VW Golf rally car. The current record is 5 minutes, 28.67 seconds, set in 2021 by Travis Pastrana driving a Subaru WRX STI; this broke his previous record of 5 minutes, 44.72 seconds set in 2017. The prior record holder was David Higgins of the Isle of Man, also driving a WRX STI, with a time of 6 minutes, 9.09 seconds set in 2014. The fastest speed ever clocked was 113 mph (182 km/h) by 6-time New England Hillclimb Champion Jerry Driscoll of East Randolph, Vermont, driving a 600 hp "Hillclimb Special" in 1999. This record held until 2011 while driving the same car, he broke his own record clocking 114.6 mph (184.4 km/h) 2 days before his 69th birthday. Travis Pastrana reached speeds of 130 mph.

In 2004 the event was restarted as a historic event, with emphasis placed on vintage cars.

Prior to the event's return in 2011, the last fullblown hillclimb race was in 2001, won by Paul Choiniere with a time of 4:59.73 on a weather-shortened course in his 500 hp methanol-fueled, all wheel drive Hyundai Tiburon.

The 2014 running of Climb to the Clouds included the first electric race car to compete in the history of this event. EVSR, the fully electric racecar created by Entropy Racing, was piloted by Tim O'Neil, former overall hill record holder, to a time of 7:28. O'Neil bested his previous overall hill record by 16 seconds and put his mark onto Mt. Washington once more by setting the fastest electric record.

Year	Driver	Vehicle	Time	Notes
1904	Harry Harkness	Mercedes 60 h.p.	24:37.6 sec	July 11/12.
1905	William M. Hilliard	Napier 60 h.p.	20:58.4 sec	Passenger Frank Townsend
1905	Stanley T. Kellogg	Indian motorcycle 3 hp Twin	20:59.2 sec	July 17/18. Event held during Glidden Tour
1923	Ralph Mulford	Chandler	17:00.0 sec	
1928	"Cannonball" Baker	Franklin	14:49.6 sec	
1930	Ab Jenkins	Studebaker President 8	14:23.0 sec	
1932	"Cannonball" Baker	Graham eight	13:26.0 sec	
1934	Al Miller	Hudson eight	13:20.6 sec	
1935	John C. Reuter	Ford V8 Special	12:46.4 sec R	July 7
1936	L. Quimby	Willys 77	13:45.0 sec	July 26
1937	B. Collier Jr	Alfa Romeo 8C 2300	14:50.5 sec	July 11
1938	Lemuel R. Ladd	Ford V8 Special	12:17.6 sec R	July 28
1939	John Ewell	BMW	12:53.1 sec	August 26
1940	Lemuel R. Ladd	Ford V8 Special	12:34.4 sec	August 25
1953	Sherwood Johnston	Jaguar XK120 Special	10:46.6 sec R	August 15/16
1954	Sherwood Johnston	Jaguar Special "C"	10:44.8 sec R	August 15
1956	Carroll Shelby	Ferrari 375 GP 4.5-litre	10:21.8 sec R	August 14/15
1961	Bill Rutan	Porsche Special	9:13.0 sec R	
1990	Tim O'Neil	VW Rally Golf	7:45.0 sec R	
1991	Paul Choiniere	Audi Quattro	7:09.61 sec R	
1992	Frank Sprongl	Audi Quattro	7:08.61 sec R	
1993	Paul Choiniere	Audi Quattro	6:46.62 sec R	
1995	Paul Choiniere	Hyundai Elantra	6:45.22 sec R	
1998	Frank Sprongl	Audi Quattro	6:41.99 sec R	
2011	David Higgins	Subaru WRX STI	6:11.54 sec R	
2014	David Higgins and co-driver Craig Drew	Subaru WRX STI	6:09.09 sec R	
2017	Travis Pastrana	Subaru WRX STI	5:44.72 sec R	
2021	Travis Pastrana	Subaru WRX STI	5:28.67 sec R	August 13–15, 2021. Postponed from 2020 due to COVID-19.
2026	Scott Speed	Subaru WRX	5:11.982 sec R	First fully paved event.

Key: R = Course record

== See also ==
- Giants Despair Hillclimb
- Hillclimbing in the United States
- Pikes Peak International Hill Climb
- Mount Washington Road Race
- Mount Washington Auto Road Bicycle Hillclimb
