= 2001 SCCA ProRally season =

2001 SCCA ProRally

Seasons
- ← 2000 2002 →

The 2001 SCCA ProRally Season was the 29th season of the SCCA ProRally and won by Mark Lovell from England. Ten rounds were held from January 2001 to October 2001. The co-driver title went to Frank Cunningham. The manufacturer's title went to Subaru.

== Calendar ==
1. Sno*Drift Rally won by Paul Choiniere
2. Cherokee Trails won by Richard Tuthill
3. Oregon Trail ProRally won by Mark Lovell
4. Rim of the World ProRally won by Mark Lovell
5. Susquehannock Trail ProRally won by Mark Lovell
6. Maine Forest Rally won by Seamus Burke
7. Ojibwe Forests Rally won by Mark Lovell
8. Wild West International ProRally won by Richard Tuthill
9. Prescott Forest ProRally won by Mark Lovell
10. Lake Superior ProRally won by Mark Lovell
