= 2004 SCCA ProRally season =

2004 SCCA ProRally

Seasons
- ← 2003 2005 (as Rally America) →

The 2004 SCCA ProRally Season was the 32nd and last season of the SCCA ProRally and won by Canadian Patrick Richard from British Columbia and his co-driver and sister Nathalie. Nine rounds were held from January 2004 to October 2004. It was the final season of SCCA ProRally as the series became known as Rally America from 2005.

== Teams and Drivers ==
Constructor	Car	No.	Driver	Rounds
Dodge	Dodge SRT-4	11	Paul Choiniere	4-5
Dodge	Dodge SRT-4	52	Doug Shepherd	All
Mitsubishi	Mitsubishi Lancer Evo IV	20	Andrew Comrie-Picard	1, 6
Mitsubishi	Mitsubishi Lancer Evo IV	39	Carl Jardevall	2
Mitsubishi	Mitsubishi Lancer Evo VII	374	Leon Styles	1-8
Mitsubishi	Mitsubishi Lancer Evo VIII	25	Seamus Burke	1–3, 6
Mitsubishi	Mitsubishi Lancer Evo VIII	116	Thomas Lawless	4, 6
Subaru	Subaru Impreza WRX	54	Patrick Richard	All
Subaru	Subaru Impreza WRX	83	Mark Utecht	1–2, 4–5, 7-9
Subaru	Subaru Impreza WRX	91	Jonathan Bottoms	1, 4, 6-9
Subaru	Subaru Impreza WRX	99	Matt Iorio	1-4
Subaru	Subaru Impreza WRX	118	Peter Workum	3-5
Subaru	Subaru Impreza WRX	124	Peter Workum	6-9
Subaru	Subaru Impreza WRX	323	Stephan Verdier	2–3, 5
Subaru	Subaru Impreza WRX STi	29	Tim O'Neil	9
Hyundai	Hyundai Tiburon	111	John Lloyd	7

== Calendar ==
1. Sno*Drift Rally won by Pat Richard
2. Oregon Trail ProRally won by Pat Richard
3. Rim of the World ProRally won by Pat Richard
4. Susquehannock Trail ProRally won by Shane Mitchell
5. Pikes Peak ProRally won by Leon Styles
6. Maine Forest Rally won by Paul Choiniere
7. Ojibwe Forests Rally won by Lauchlin O'Sullivan
8. Colorado Cog Rally won by Leon Styles
9. Lake Superior ProRally won by Seamus Burke
