= 2003 SCCA ProRally season =

2003 SCCA ProRally

Seasons
- ← 2002 2004 →

The 2003 SCCA ProRally Season was the 31st season of the SCCA ProRally and won by Manxman David Higgins and co-driver Daniel Barritt. Nine rounds were held but the season was overshadowed by a tragic accident at the Oregon Trail Rally in which the 2001 champion Mark Lovell and his co-driver Roger Freeman were killed. They were the second and third drivers to die in the series, after Jonel Broscanc, who was killed in an accident at the 1992 Susquehannock Trail Performance Rally.

Nonetheless, the title was won by Higgins who beat Americans Lauchlin O'Sullivan and Ramana Lagemann to defend his title from 2002. Higgins is now known for winning five straight titles in SCCA ProRally's successor Rally America. The manufacturer's title went to Mitsubishi.

== Teams and Drivers ==
Constructor	Car	No.	Driver	Rounds
Mitsubishi	Mitsubishi Lancer Evo VIII	1	David Higgins	All
Mitsubishi	Mitsubishi Lancer Evo VIII	6	Lauchlin O'Sullivan	All
Subaru	Subaru Impreza S7 WRC '01	4	Mark Lovell	2-5
Subaru	Subaru Impreza S7 WRC '01	5	Ramana Lagemann	2-9
Subaru	Subaru Impreza S7 WRC '01	14	Pasi Hagström	8-9
Subaru	Subaru Impreza WRX	15	Jonny Milner	1-3
Subaru	Subaru Impreza WRX	16	Tapio Laukkanen	1
Subaru	Subaru Impreza WRX	45	Shane Mitchell	All
Subaru	Subaru Impreza WRX	83	Mark Utecht	1-8
Hyundai	Hyundai Tiburon	11	Paul Choiniere	3, 6, 9
Dodge	Dodge SRT-4	52	Doug E. Shepherd	1–2, 4-9

== Calendar ==
1. Sno*Drift Rally won by David Higgins
2. Rim of the World ProRally won by David Higgins
3. Susquehannock Trail ProRally won by David Higgins
4. Pikes Peak International Hill Climb ProRally won by Mark Lovell
5. Oregon Trail ProRally won by David Higgins
6. Maine Forest Rally won by David Higgins
7. Ojibwe Forests Rally won by David Higgins
8. Wild West International ProRally won by Pasi Hagstrom
9. Lake Superior ProRally won by David Higgins
