= Brotherus =

Surname first used around 1600

Brotherus is a surname used first around 1600 by Stephan Sigfridi Brotherus, who was a priest in the town of Vantaa in Finland. There are currently about 100 people alive with this surname, most of whom are living in Finland.

== Notable people ==
The botanist Viktor Ferdinand Brotherus was a well-known bearer of the name. Many living and deceased members of the family can be found from the Brotherus family database maintained by Robert Johannes Brotherus.

Elina Brotherus is a photographer who attended the Helsinki School.

Robert Brotherus is an American rally driver of Finnish origin, who helped bring back the Mount Washington Hillclimb Auto Race.
