= Ford World Rally Team =

1978-2012 World Rally Championship manufacturer team

Ford
- Full name: BP Ford World Rally Team (until 2007); BP Ford Abu Dhabi World Rally Team (2007–2012)
- Base: (United Kingdom) Cumbria, England
- Team principal(s): Malcolm Wilson
- Technical director: Christian Loriaux
- Chassis: Ford Fiesta RS WRC
- Tyres: Michelin

World Rally Championship history
- Debut: 1997 Monte Carlo Rally (with M-Sport)
- Last event: 2012 Rally Catalunya
- Manufacturers' Championships: 3 (1979, 2006, 2007)
- Drivers' Championships: 1 (Björn Waldegård 1979)
- Rally wins: 76

The Ford World Rally Team, also known as the Ford Motor Co. Team prior to 2005, was Ford Motor Company's factory World Rally Championship team. It was a regular competitor in the series from the 1970s until withdrawing following the 2012 season.

== History ==
=== 1978 season ===
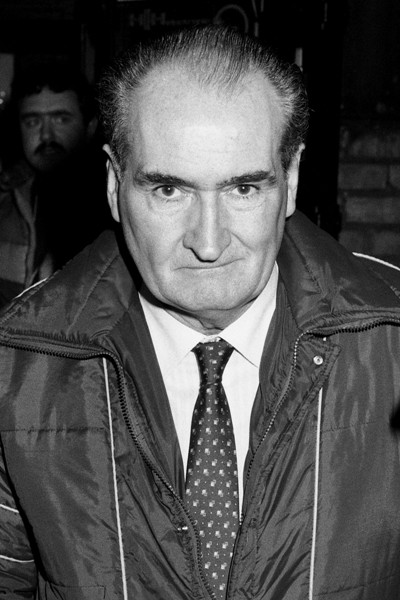
The late Ford Motorsport manager Peter Ashcroft in 1982

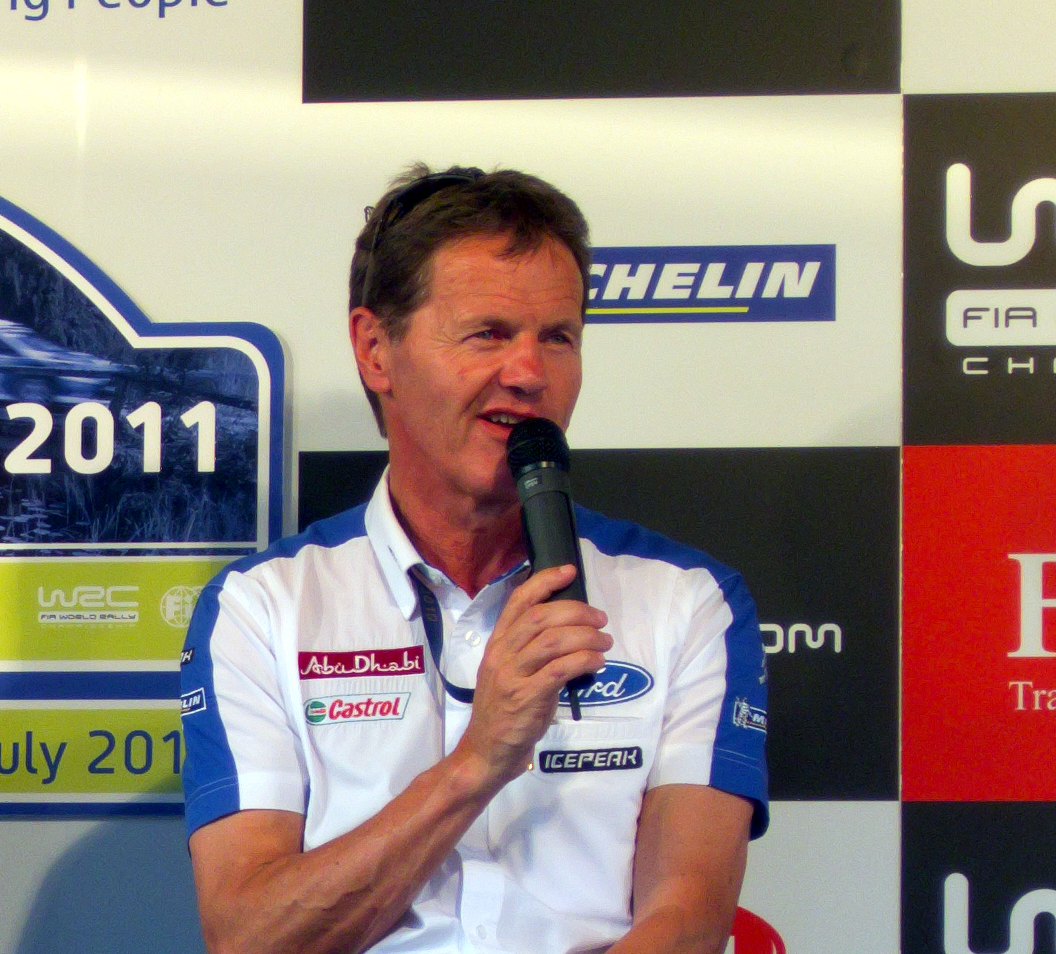
Ford team director Malcolm Wilson at the 2011 Rally Finland

Ford ended the 1978 season with a win for Hannu Mikkola on the season ending Lombard RAC Rally at the hands of an Escort RS1800. He was followed by Björn Waldegård and Britain's Russell Brookes in similar machinery.

=== 1979 season ===
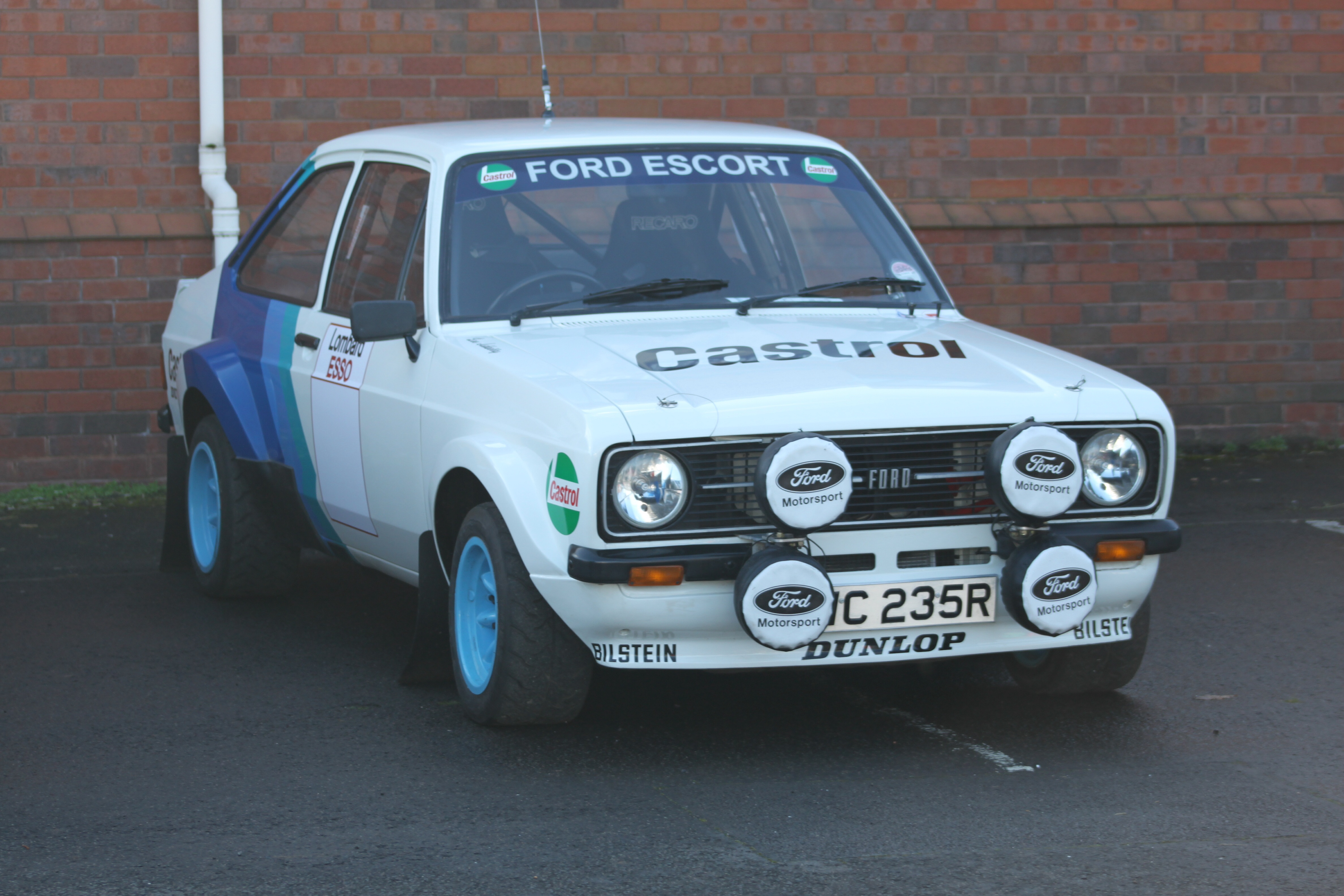
A Ford Escort RS in 1979 Ford Motorsport colours at the 2014 Race Retro show

Ford won the World Rally Championship (WRC) in 1979 with the Ford Escort RS1800 and drivers Hannu Mikkola, Björn Waldegård and Ari Vatanen.

=== 1980–1985 seasons ===
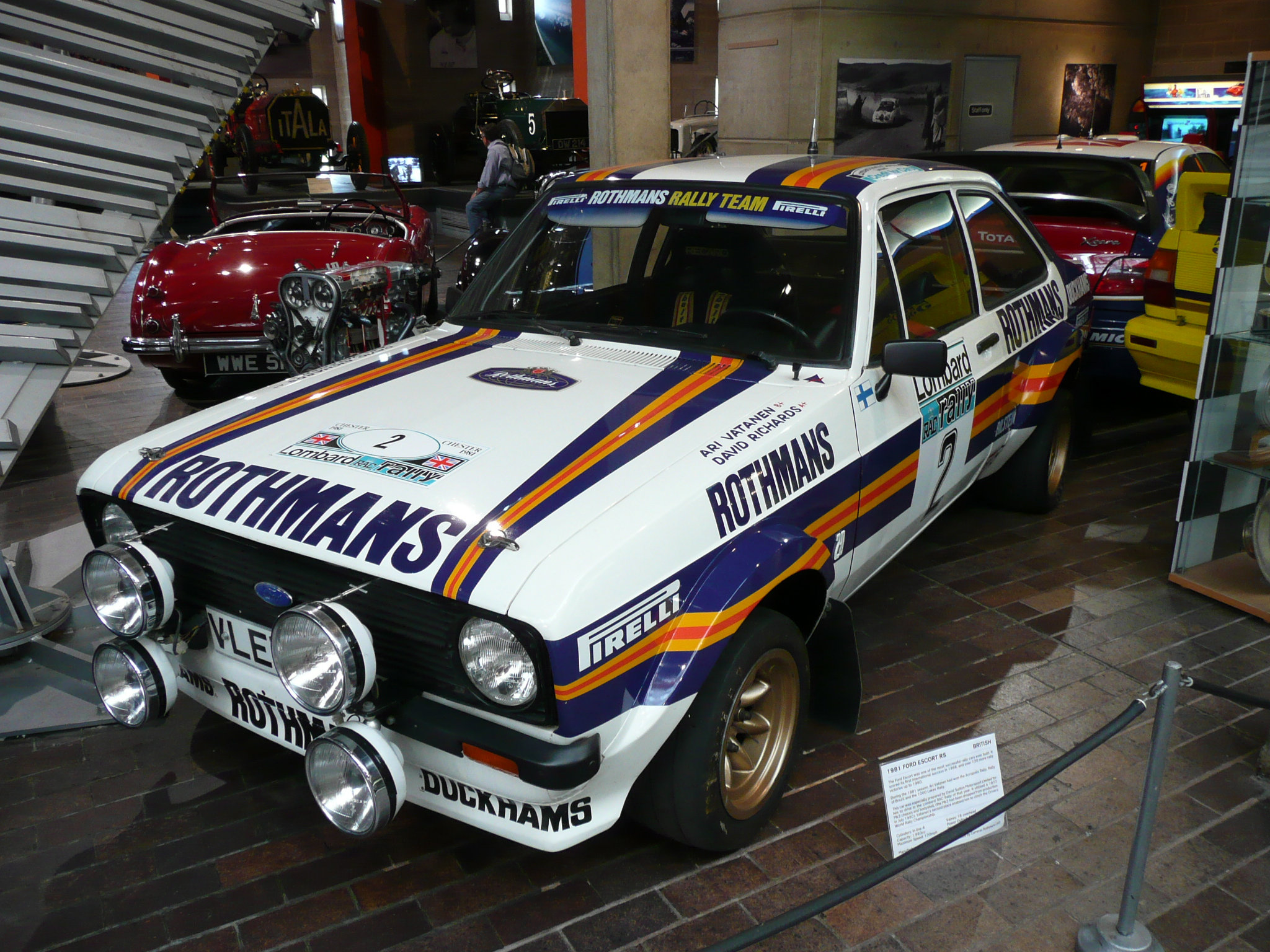
Ari Vatenen's 1981 Rothmans sponsored Ford Escort RS

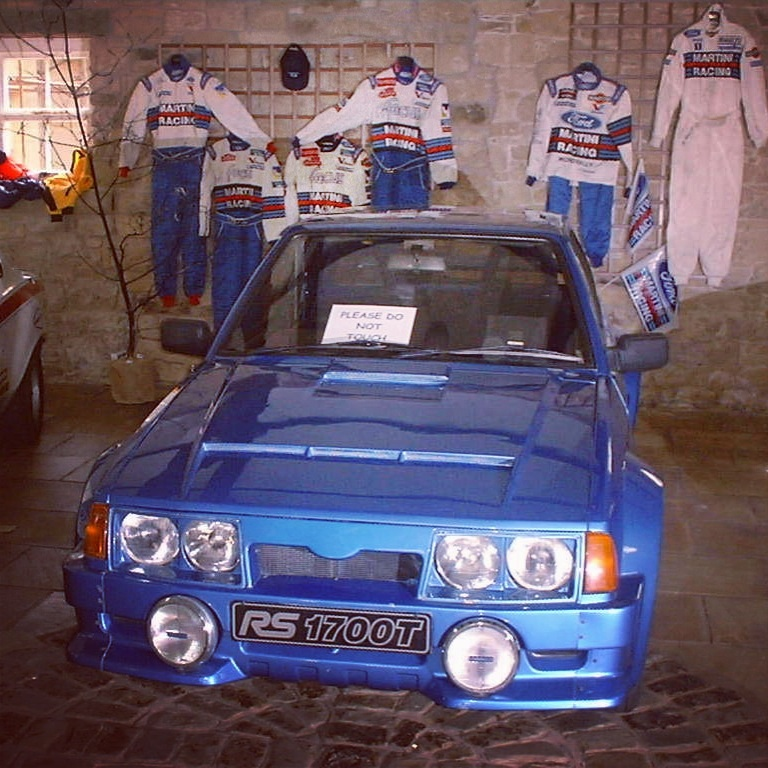
Ford Escort RS1700T at M-Sport, 2001.

Ford did not officially enter any cars for these seasons after winning the 1979 World Rally Championship season, they instead concentrated on development of the Ford Escort RS 1700T, however this programme was cancelled in 1983. A new car was required to compete with four-wheel drive Group B rivals like the Audi Quattro S1 and Peugeot 205 T16. Lessons learned from the RS 1700T programme were used in the development of the RS200, which hit the stages in 1986. However, Ari Vatanen did win the 1981 drivers championship in a Rothmans liveried Ford Escort RS, but this was run by David Sutton Cars and not the official works Ford team.

=== 1986 season ===
Having spent time away from the sport developing the Ghia styled RS200, Ford made a return to the world rallying stage at the second round in Sweden. Ford's new RS200 featured four-wheel drive, a turbocharged Cosworth BDT engine generating 450 bhp and a new blue and white Ford Motorsport livery.

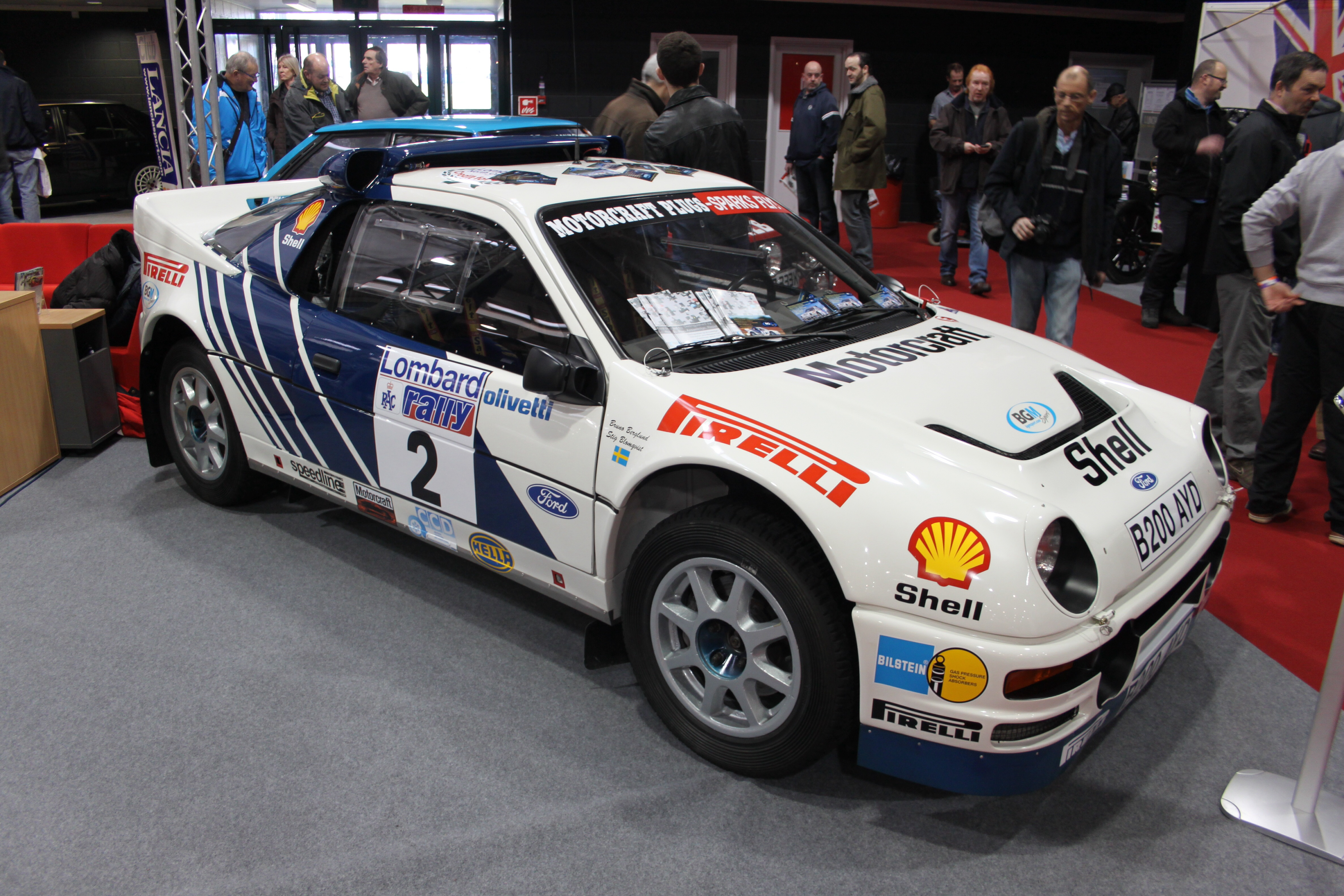
Stig Blomqvist's Lombard RAC Rally RS200 as seen at Race Retro 2014

Ford employed the services of Swedish drivers Stig Blomqvist and Kalle Grundel, but they would each only be entered on four rallies in a season overshadowed with tragedy. Grundel achieved a podium finish on the RS200's debut in Sweden, a result that would not be bettered all season, the following round in Portugal saw an RS200 driven by Joaquim Santos leave the road, killing three spectators, Ford withdrew their entry for that rally.

Fifth place for Grundel on the Lombard RAC Rally marked the end of the road for the RS200, as Group B rallying was banned for 1987, Ford finished fifth in the manufacturers championship behind rivals Peugeot, Lancia, Volkswagen and Audi.

=== 1987 season ===
Ford started the post Group B era with the Sierra XR4x4, which had the benefits of 4WD, but was not as powerful as its rivals, and then replaced it with the RWD Sierra RS Cosworth which was more powerful, but lacked grip and traction on the gravel rallies that dominate the World Rally Championship.

Stig Blomqvist was entered into the Monte Carlo, Swedish and New Zealand rounds of the championship in a white Texaco sponsored Ford Sierra XR4x4, he could only muster a 6th-place finish on his home rally, after being disqualified and crashing out of the other two rallies.

The Sierra RS Cosworth proved to be far more successful in comparison, it would not win during 1987, but it did achieve a number of podium finishes. The car debuted on the Safari Rally, again driven by Stig Blomqvist, but would retire following a fire, its next outing would be on the island of Corsica. Blomqvist would again retire with turbo failure but his teammates Carlos Sainz and Didier Auriol fared much better, finishing 7th and 8th respectively. Ari Vatanen paired up with Blomqvist on the 1000 Lakes Rally in Finland, their speed and experience helping to negate some of the advantage of 4WD that their rivals enjoyed. They finished 2nd and 3rd respectively.

Ford finished the season with 2nd and 3rd places for Blomqvist and Jimmy McRae, again against more capable rival machinery. Sporadic appearances throughout the season with cars that were compromised in one way or another meant that Stig Blomqvist would finish in a lowly 7th position in the drivers championship, whilst Ford could only manage to finish 5th in the manufacturers championship.

=== 1988 season ===
Ford entered the 1988 World Rally Championship season using both the XR4x4 and the Sierra RS Cosworth models, the Texaco sponsorship had gone, and the cars now featured a corporate blue and white striped Ford colour scheme, similar to that seen on the Ford RS200 in 1986. The services of Stig Blomqvist, Carlos Sainz and Didier Auriol were retained from 1987, each driver being entered on the rallies in Portugal, Finland and Italy. Blomqvist would also be entered for Round 2 in Rally Sweden, whilst Sainz and Auriol were entered in Corsica. A three car team of Blomqvist, Sainz and Mark Lovell were entered for the season closing Lombard RAC Rally.

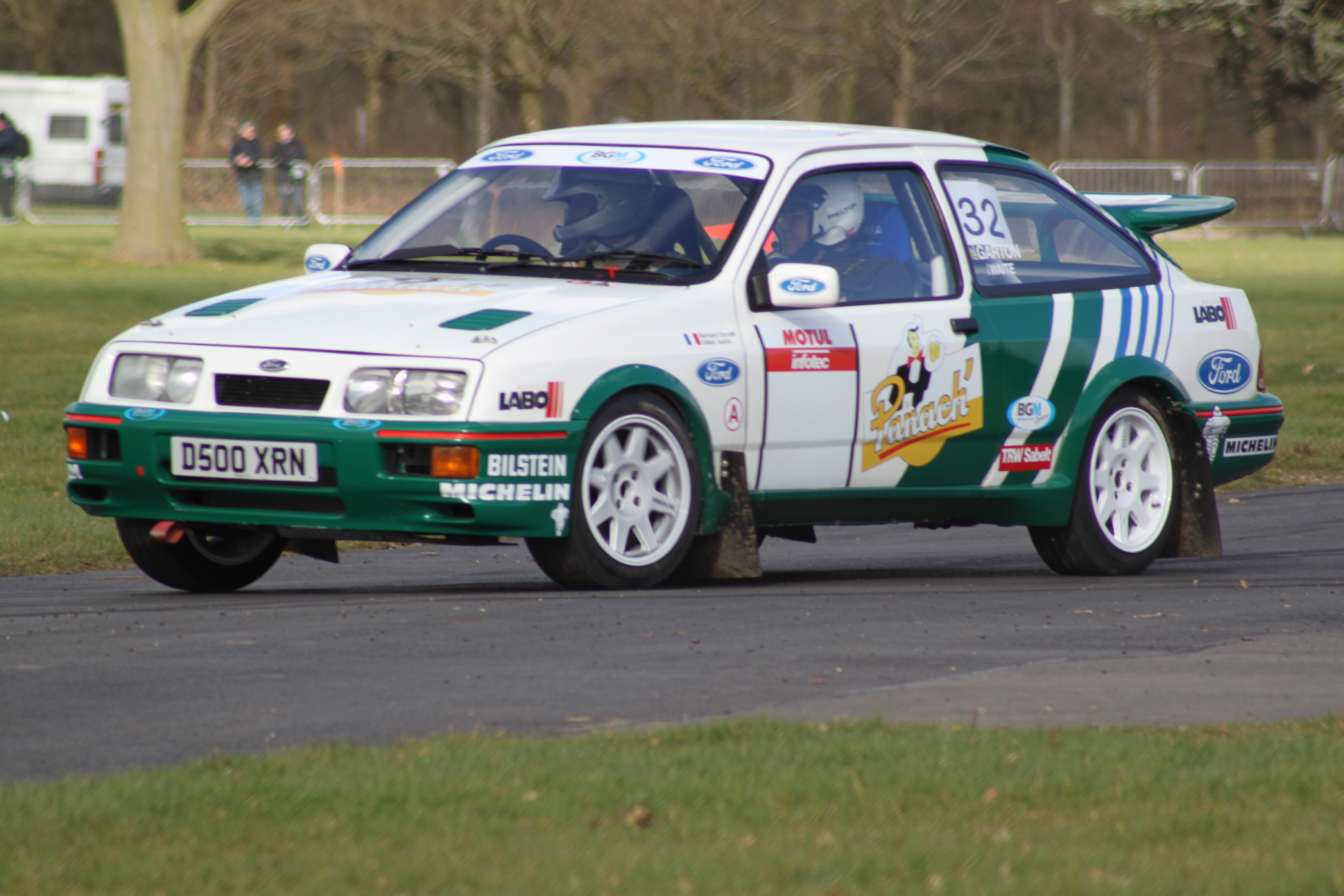
A replica of Auriol's winning car being driven at Race Retro 2014

Blomqvist kicked off Ford's season with 2nd place on his home round in a Rallysport Sweden prepared Sierra XR4x4, the best result for the 4WD Ford, and something that would not be bettered. The Ford Sierra RS Cosworth would return for Round 3 in Portugal, and Blomqvist would use it to finish in 5th place, but only after Sainz and Auriol had both retired from the event. Ford would return to winning ways in Corsica; Didier Auriol steering his green and white Panach' sponsored Sierra around the island ahead of opposition from Lancia, for his first victory, and Ford's 23rd in the top flight. Sainz would collect points for 5th in Corsica and then 6th in Finland, another rally where Auriol would finish on the podium, this time in 3rd place, two places ahead of Blomqvist.

Auriol's luck ran out on the San Remo rally in Italy, suffering an accident that would force him to retire, Sainz and Blomqvist would finish low down the order in 5th and 7th places respectively. For the final round in Great Britain Swedish and Spanish crews would finish in 6th and 7th places, whilst Lovell would finish in a disappointing 17th place in his bright yellow Sound 2000 sponsored Ford Sierra RS Cosworth. Ford would finish the season 2nd behind Lancia in the Manufacturers Championship, with a total of 79 points.

=== 1989 season ===
It was evident from previous seasons that Ford did not have a car that was fully capable of challenging Lancia and their Delta Integrale, so for the 1989 season the Blue Oval was absent for most of the rallies, entering cars for the Corsica and Lombard RAC Rally rounds only.

Three cars were entered in Corsica, a Q8 liveried car for Gianfranco Cunico, a yellow Sound 2000 sponsored car for Mark Lovell and a third car for French driver Pierre-César Baroni. Lovell would retire after suffering from a misfire, Baroni would retire after an accident, and Cunico would go on to finish 7th overall. The Italian driver would suffer the misfortune of retiring after an accident on his second Ford outing in Great Britain. Ford would finish 13th in the Manufacturers standings after scoring just six points for the season.

=== 1990 season ===
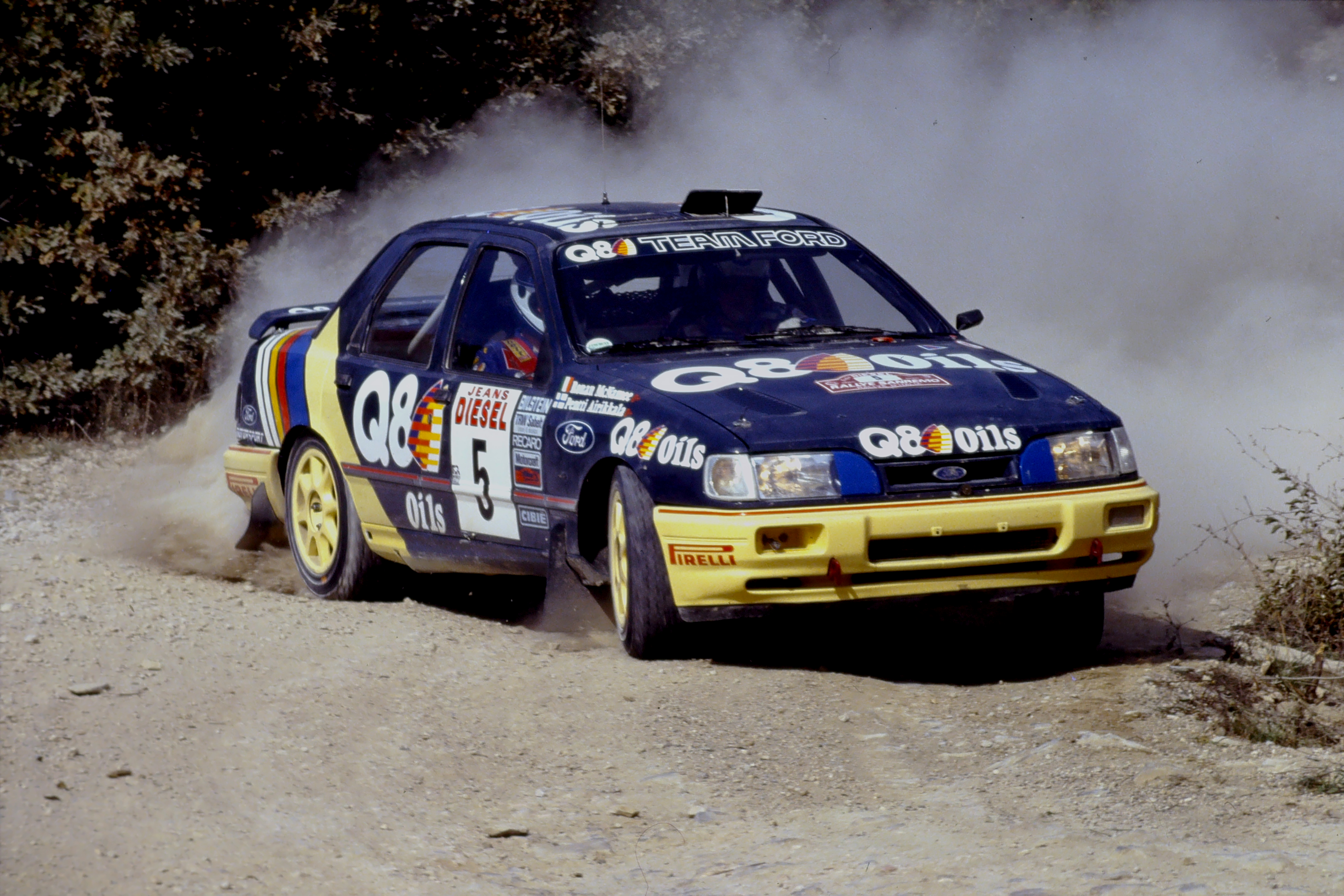
Pentti Airikkala's 1990 Ford Sierra RS Cosworth 4x4 in Q8 livery at the Rally Sanremo

Results over the past few seasons had proved one thing; in order to return to winning ways Ford would need a powerful, turbocharged car with 4WD capabilities. The 3-door Sierra RS Cosworth was no longer being sold by Ford, so they instead utilised the new Sierra RS Cosworth 4x4 4-door saloon model, which went on sale in 1990.

The new car was still powered by a Cosworth developed turbocharged engine, but delays sourcing a suitable gearbox meant that it would not be used until the end of the 1990 World Rally Championship season. The team retained the Q8 sponsorship from the 1989 World Rally Championship season, the cars again being painted blue with cream coloured bumpers, but the driver line-up had almost completely changed, only Franco Cunico remained. He was now joined by Pentti Airikkala and Malcolm Wilson who had been teammates at the Rothmans Rally Team 10 years previously.

Ford's season kicked off in Finland, where all three drivers left the start ramp, but would not see the finish, Airikkala suffered a gearbox problem, Cunico suffered an accident and Wilson withdrew after a service infringement. Results weren't much better on Cunico's home rally in Italy, where he and Wilson again both retired and Airikkala finished in a disappointing 11th place. Airikkala was seeded in car number 1 for the final round in Great Britain, but he and Wilson would again retire, the only Ford finisher being Alessandro Fiorio who had replaced Cunico. Ford would finish 8th in the championship, with a total of 22 points.

=== 1991 season ===
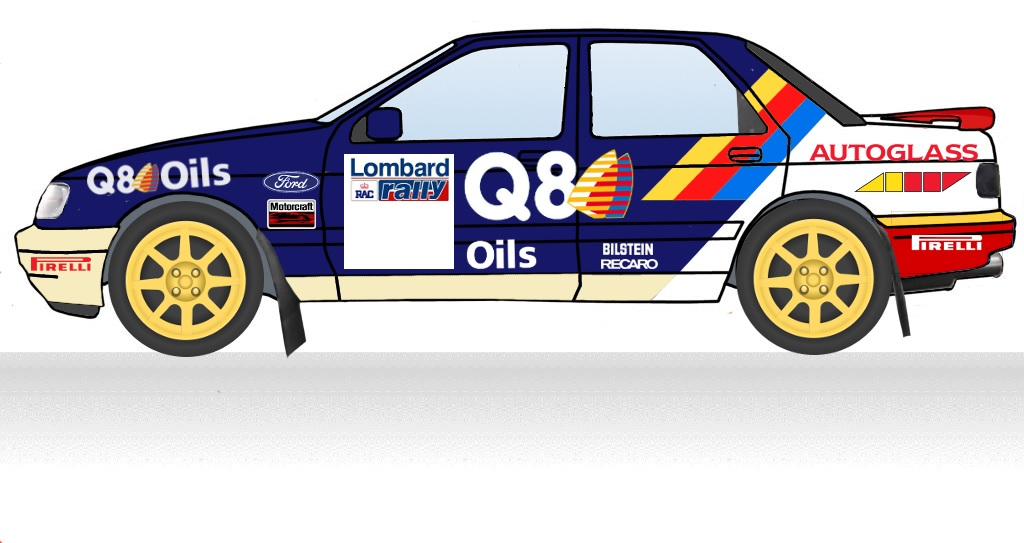
1991 Q8 Ford & Autoglass livery as used on the Lombard RAC Rally

The 1991 World Rally Championship season was an opportunity for Ford to push for victory again, and to evolve the Sierra RS Cosworth 4x4; lessons learned on the stages would be used to simultaneously develop the Ford Escort RS Cosworth. The cars were again predominantly blue with title sponsorship from Q8, but now featured extra sponsors like Autoglass and Noberasco, which were displayed in white sections on the bonnet and rear flanks of the car. British driver Malcolm Wilson returned, and was joined by a relatively unknown French driver called Francois Delecour. Both drivers were entered on six of the European rounds of the Championship, with Delecour also entering the Catalonia Rally in Spain. A third car was shared by Alessandro Fiorio and Gwyndaf Evans, and a single car was made available for Ari Vatanen at Rally Finland.

Delecour surprised many with his pace on the season-opening Monte-Carlo Rally; after a spirited drive, he finished in third place, leading home teammates Wilson and Fiorio, who finished 7th and 10th respectively. This feat was not to be repeated in Portugal, where all three cars retired after going off the road. Delecour also failed to finish in Corsica after suffering differential issues, while Wilson finished in fifth place. The rough and rugged stages of the Acropolis Rally were renowned for breaking cars, and that turned out to be the case for the Sierra RS Cosworth 4x4 as all three cars retired with mechanical ailments. A single car was entered for Vatanen on his home rally in Finland; he kept the car on the road and won eight stages on his way to 7th place.

The San Remo rally would prove to be more fruitful than the Acropolis had been when the Q8 cars returned, all three cars would finish this rally in the top ten, with Delecour finishing 4th overall ahead of Fiorio in 9th and Wilson in 10th. 1991 was the inaugural year for the Catalunya rally and was only registered as a round of the drivers championship, two cars were entered, one for Delecour and the other for Jose Maria Bardolet, a pairing that would secure 3rd and 4th positions respectively. To end the season, Gwyndaf Evans joined Wilson and Delecour. It would not be a happy hunting ground for the British drivers on their home rally, the Lombard RAC Rally, both drivers retiring in the forests of Wales on day 2, their French teammate would go on to finish in 6th place. A winless season left Ford finishing the manufacturers championship in fourth place, with 54 points.

=== 1992 season ===
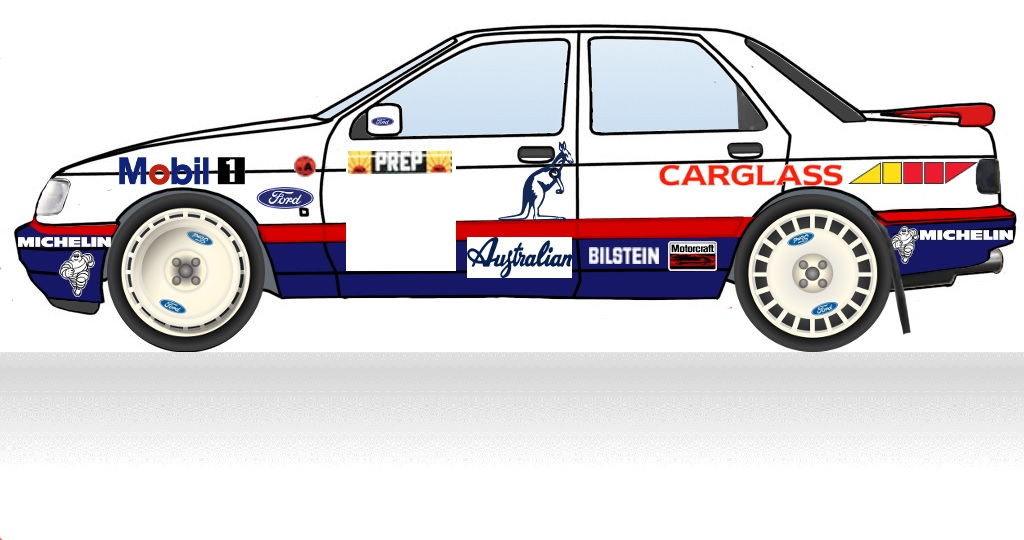
1992 Mobil 1 livery as used on the Monte Carlo Rally

There were a number of changes for the 1992 World Rally Championship season at the Boreham based Ford squad, the most obvious being the new driver line-up. Francois Delecour remained at the team, but he was now joined by double World Champion Miki Biasion, who Ford hoped would add the final ingredients for a championship push. Q8 no longer sponsored the Sierra RS Cosworth 4x4 cars, which were now painted with a white and blue Mobil 1 livery. New technical rules were in place which reduced the turbo restrictor diameter from 40mm, down to 38mm, and in the background, development work continued on the Ford Escort RS Cosworth.

Ford would follow a similar strategy to 1991 by electing to enter the European gravel and Tarmac rounds only. Biasion and Delecour were paired up on all of the rallies that Ford entered except Catalunya, where Delecour was joined by Jose Maria Bardolet, and in Great Britain, where Biasion was joined by Malcolm Wilson.

Delecour kicked off his season by winning 5 stages in Monte Carlo on his way to 4th place, twelve minutes and four places ahead of his Italian teammate, who would have a better result in Portugal, finishing 2nd behind his former teammate Juha Kankkunen. Engine troubles had denied Delecour any points in Portugal, but it would hold for both he and Biasion on the Acropolis rally, where the pair finished 5th and 3rd respectively. The fast, flowing Finnish stages of the 1000 Lakes Rally allowed Biasion to continue his string of good results, he would collect more points by finishing in 5th place, Delecour however, seemed to be suffering the bad luck in the team as he finished the rally off the road, these gremlins would strike both Delecour and Bardolet in Catalunya. Biasion and Wilson would fare much better on the Lombard RAC Rally, with both cars finishing in the top ten. Ford finished the championship with 94 points and 3rd position, and would retire the Sierra RS Cosworth 4x4, as a new car would be ready for 1993.

=== 1993 season ===
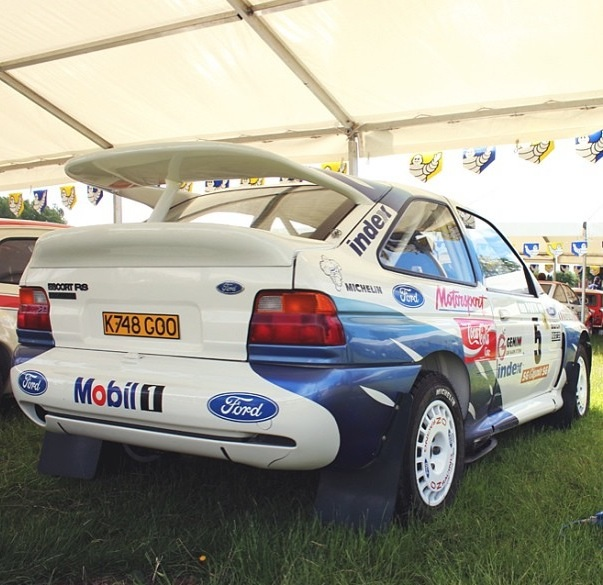
Francois Delecour's 1993 Ford Escort RS Cosworth in Rally Portugal livery

Ford introduced the Escort RS Cosworth.

=== 1994 season ===
Development of the Escort RS Cosworth continued during the 1994 season; a sequential gearbox and an antilag system being introduced, along with new larger 18 inch wheels for Tarmac rounds. This would be the final year at Ford for double champion Miki Biasion, his previous form had not continued and he would not finish higher than third place all season. His teammate Francois Delecour demonstrated how the car should be driven, by winning the season opening Monte-Carlo Rally, he would then miss four months of the season after breaking both of his ankles. A third car was driven on a number of rounds by Bruno Thiry, and a number of other drivers including future champion Tommi Makinen. The Finnish driver would only drive the Escort RS Cosworth on his home rally that year, but he would secure a second win for the Ford team.

Thiry would finish the season with two more points than his more illustrious teammate Biasion, but the team's combined performance would leave them third in the championship behind Japanese rivals, Toyota and Subaru.

=== 1995 season ===
Commitments in the Formula 1 and BTCC championships meant that the rally budget at Boreham was significantly reduced, as a consequence Ford were not officially entered into the 1995 season as a manufacturer, the work instead being contracted out to RAS Sport of Belgium.

=== 1996 season ===
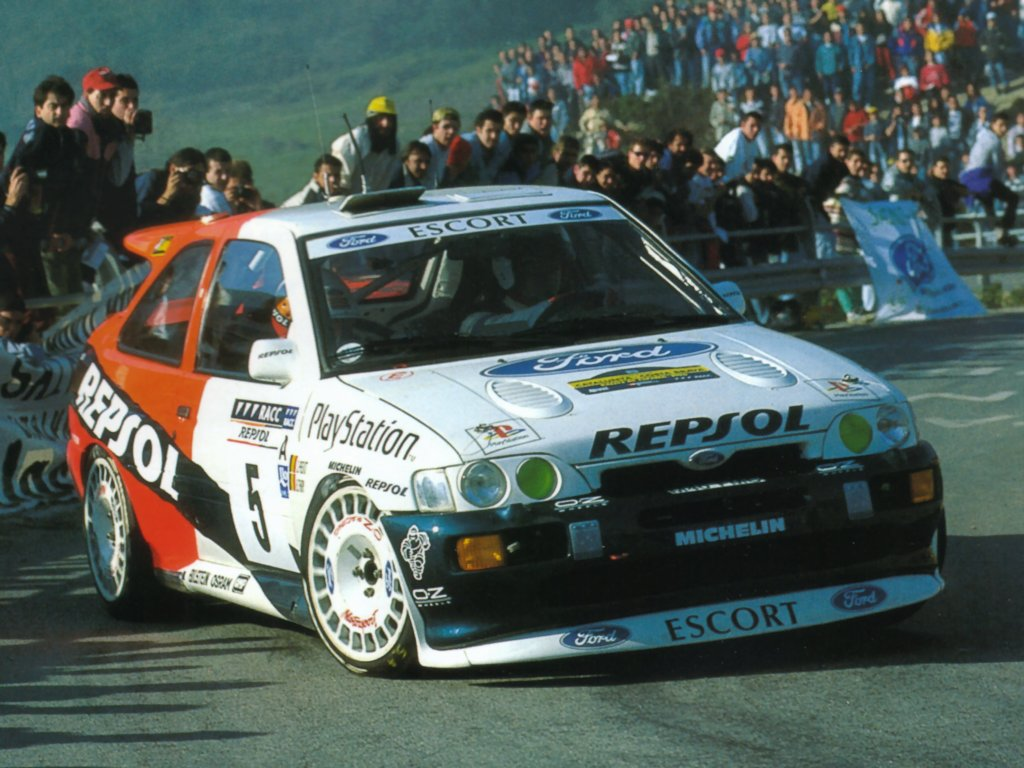
Bruno Thiry steers the Repsol Ford Escort RS Cosworth through the stages of the 1996 Rally Catalunya

Ford entered the 1996 season as full manufacturer entry, again with the Escort RS Cosworth, but now with backing from Repsol and a new lead driver, in the form of Carlos Sainz. Double champion Sainz had joined the Ford team after losing the battle for the 1995 championship to Colin McRae, he would have a number of new teammates at Ford, starting with Francois Delecour at Rally Sweden, and then former champion Stig Blomqvist at the Safari Rally in Kenya. Welsh driver Gwyndaf Evans drove the second car in Rally Indonesia, it would be his only appearance before replaced by Bruno Thiry for the rest of the season.

Sainz's pace was undeniable, even in the ageing Escort RS Cosworth, as he would go on to win the Indonesian Rally and finish on the podium on every rally he finished, however, retirements in Kenya, Finland and on his home round in Spain would leave him finishing third in the championship. Thiry finished on the podium for the final two rounds in Italy and Spain, results that would help him to finish sixth in the driver's standings. 1996 would prove to be the swan song year for both the Escort RS Cosworth and the preparation of works Ford cars at Boreham, resulting in the team finishing third in the manufacturers championship.

=== 1997 season ===
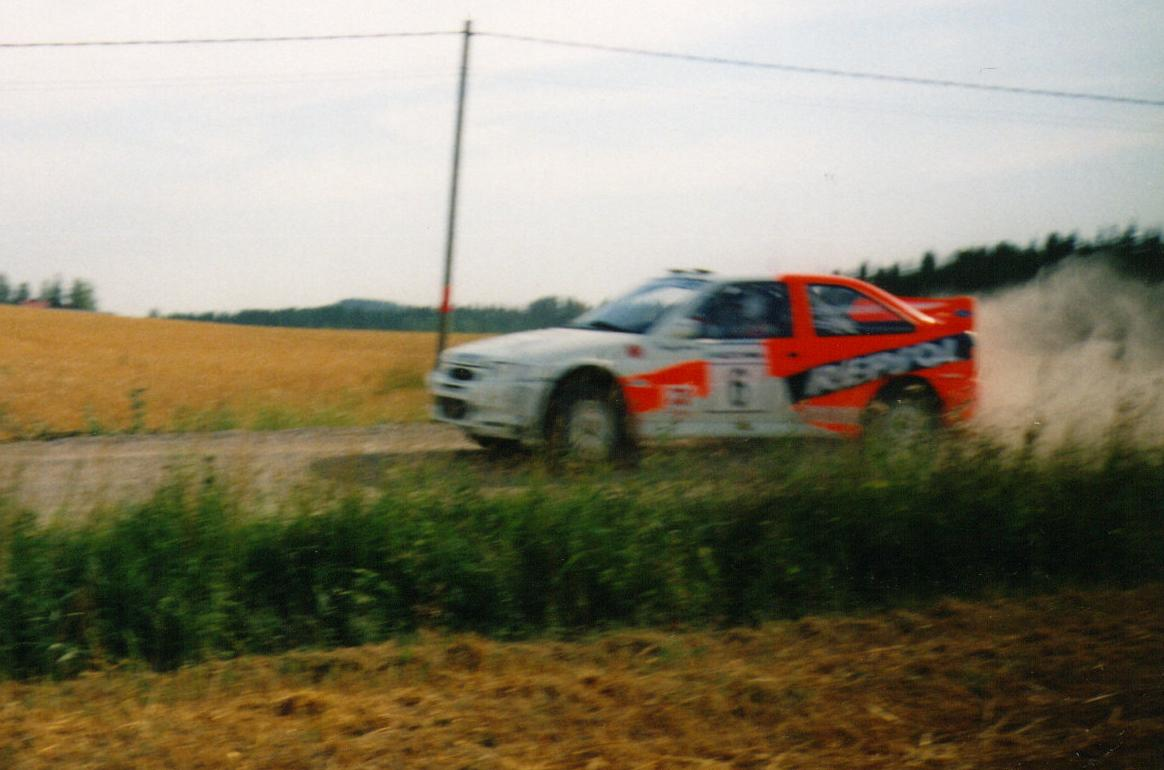
Juha Kankkunen heading for 2nd place on the 1997 Rally Finland

1997 saw the introduction of the Ford Escort WRC, which was now being run by the Cumbria-based M-Sport team, rather than being based at the long term Ford Motorsport home of Boreham. The team continued to be sponsored by Repsol, with a distinctive white and orange livery, and the car featured dramatic changes to the engine, as it was the Escort Group A car's main weak point, and also had several other cosmetic changes including a new front bumper and rear spoiler. On the driver front the team continued to be led by double World Rally champion Carlos Sainz, who drove all fourteen rounds, winning the Acropolis and Indonesia rallies, also often finishing on the podium. He would eventually finish third in the championship. The second seat was initially filled by German driver Armin Schwarz, however, he was replaced after the sixth round in Corsica, following some disappointing results, and the fact that his sponsorship money had not arrived. His understudy was a more than capable Juha Kankkunen, who completed the season in the second car, finishing on the podium on no less than six occasions. A third car was entered at the Network Q RAC Rally for Angelo Medghini.

Ford finished second in the manufacturer's championship, being sandwiched by champions Subaru and third placed Mitsubishi.

=== 1998 season ===
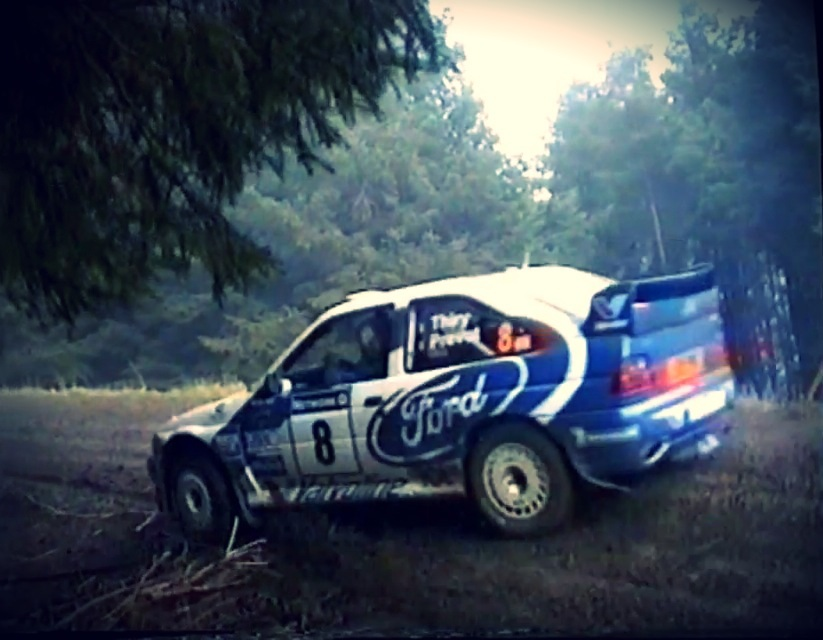
Bruno Thiry cuts a corner on the 1998 Network Q Rally in his Ford Escort WRC

1998 marked the final season of the Escort WRC, with that year's Rally of Great Britain being its last event, ending the model name's thirty-year association with factory-backed international rallying. The team retained the services of four-time world champion Finn, Juha Kankkunen and Belgian Bruno Thiry, a championship mainstay and veteran pilot of previous Ford rallying models, including the Escort RS Cosworth. Carlos Sainz had left the team at the end of the 1997 season and took the Repsol sponsorship with him. The Escort WRC started the Monte-Carlo Rally with a new blue and white Ford livery, and a dedication to ex-Ford rally legend Roger Clark who died earlier in the year.

As events transpired, neither driver would manage to mark the Escort's swansong year with a final victory. The Escort still proved, frustratingly for the championship hopeful Kankkunen, persistently ineffective on asphalt rounds of the calendar, woes for which not even Thiry's performances could compensate. A late injury to the Belgian provided an early season cameo role for 1981 world champion Ari Vatanen, who finished third at the Safari Rally, behind compatriot Kankkunen and first-time world rally victor for Mitsubishi, Richard Burns. Kankkunen eventually scored sufficient points and podiums, including second ahead of Thiry in Britain, to finish fourth in the 1998 drivers' standings, although, with the announcement of the looming high-profile arrival of Colin McRae to the team for the following year, this success did not deter the Finn from deciding to leave the M-Sport outfit, both he and Thiry proceeding to sign Subaru contracts for 1999.

=== 1999 season ===
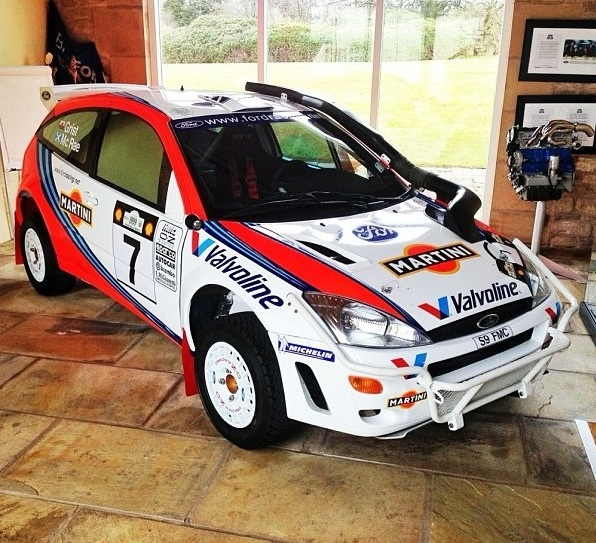
1999 Ford Focus WRC Colin McRae

The Ford and M-Sport-built Ford Focus WRC replaced the Escort WRC for 1999. It debuted on the Monte Carlo Rally in January, with Colin McRae and Simon Jean-Joseph driving the two Martini Racing-liveried works machines. It set several fastest stage times and McRae finished a provisional third place on the stages, only to be disqualified later due to an illegal water pump.

McRae gave the Focus its first win two events later at the Safari Rally, in Kenya, finishing over 15 minutes ahead of the second placed Toyota Corolla WRC of Didier Auriol. Although McRae then immediately followed up this success with a victory at the next round in Portugal, the Scot's title chances faded amid reliability problems with the new car and a series of costly shunts. McRae finished sixth in the drivers' standings.

During this debut season, many drivers drove the second Focus of the team – France's Simon Jean-Joseph for some tarmac events, 2003 World Rally champion Petter Solberg of Norway (who replaced Rådström in the Safari Rally) and Thomas Rådström of Sweden on loose-surface rounds (except Safari who was replaced by Petter Solberg).

=== 2000 season ===
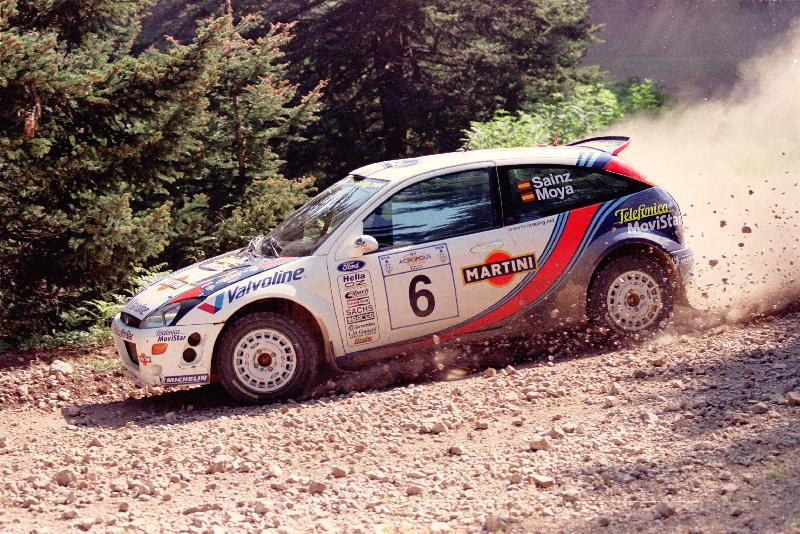
2000 WRC Acropolis Day3 Sainz

His former role at Toyota now redundant after his former team's withdrawal as manufacturers' champions at the end of the 1999 season, double world champion Spaniard Carlos Sainz chose to return to his 1997 team for the 2000 season, joining the incumbent Colin McRae. Both men drove the Focus WRC at every event of the season. They finished 3rd and 4th respectively in the driver's championship, albeit only managing to bring Ford 2nd place in the manufacturers title race behind Peugeot. Once again, bit-part driver Piero Liatti was called upon to help improve Ford's points returns on asphalt.

=== 2001 season ===
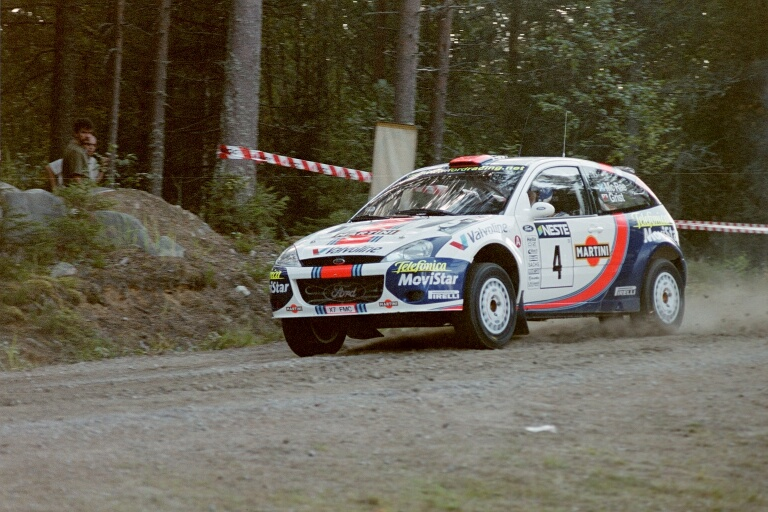
Colin McRae & Nicky Grist guide their Martini sponsored Focus WRC through a stage of the 2001 Rally Finland.

McRae and Sainz were joined for the 2001 season by a regular third driver in the returning Ford favourite of the early to mid-1990s, Frenchman François Delecour. McRae's season oscillated between a protracted pointless run on the season's first few rounds, including retirement on the season-opening Monte Carlo Rally while leading the event from Tommi Mäkinen, and a run of three consecutive victories on the Argentine, Cypriot and Greek events, the latter placing him as joint leader of the championship with Makinen midway through the season. Leading the points standings outright upon entering his final home round, however, McRae led in the initial stages only to crash out of the event, allowing a consistently points-scoring Richard Burns to sneak past him for the title. Ford also lost their opportunity for the manufacturers' title on this event, as rivals Peugeot secured a decisive 1–2 finish with Marcus Grönholm and Harri Rovanperä.

Sainz, meanwhile, endured a winless but not wholly uncompetitive season, even remaining an outsider for the title entering the final event. A crash of his own put paid to such ambitions, with the Spaniard slumping to sixth place in the points standings, with 33 points.

=== 2002 season ===
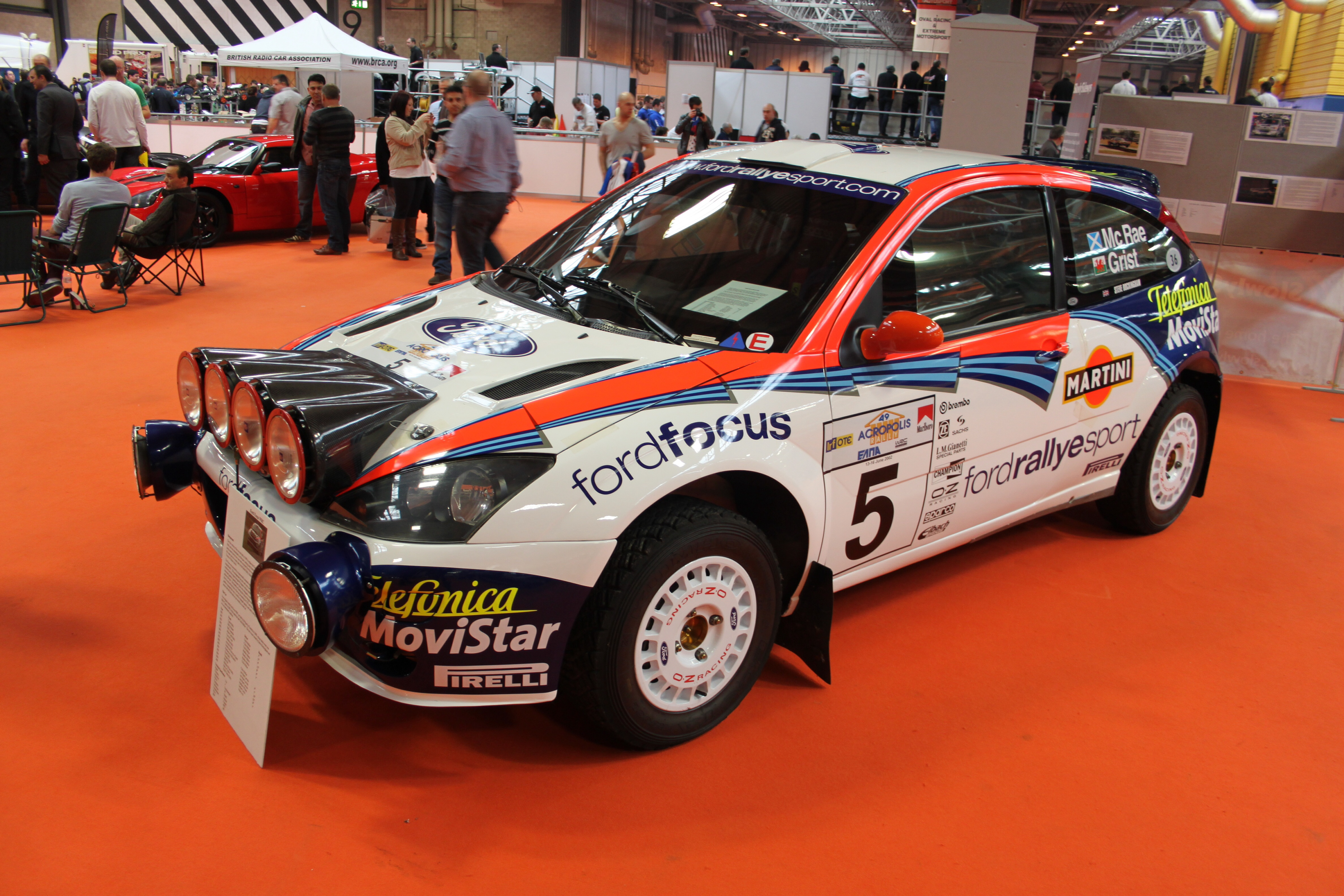
Colin McRae & Nicky Grist's 2002 Ford Focus RS WRC at the Autosport Show, January 2013

McRae and Sainz regrouped for both drivers' final seasons with Ford in 2002. Simultaneously, youngster Markko Märtin replaced Delecour as the team's third driver, having found himself crowded out by the presence of Richard Burns and Petter Solberg at former team, Subaru.

Sainz's third place in the championship beat his Scottish teammate's fourth place in the standings. His only victory of the year came on that year's Rally Argentina, which he inherited after the unlikely exclusion of both of the initially 1–2 finishing dominant works Peugeots of Marcus Grönholm and Englishman Burns. McRae began his own season with fourth place on the Rally Monte Carlo, but he suffered an injury to his hand when he crashed out on the Tour de Corse, which left him hampered and struggling to a single-point-scoring finish on the following tarmac round in Spain. Injury worries for Sainz, meanwhile, came not from himself, but in the form of long-time co-driver Luis Moya, who was forced to end his unbroken year-on-year chain of appearances with his compatriot in order to recuperate, with Marc Marti stepping in for the double world champion's home rally. Intrusive spectator parking on the event blinded Sainz, causing him to eventually crash out. With the Fords having initially dominated the stage times on the first rough gravel event of the year in Cyprus particularly through McRae, Märtin and François Duval, successive retirements left McRae as the sole occupier of the lead for the Blue Oval, which he lost after a number of unfortunate shunts which eventually left himself holding on to a mere sixth place overall, and the two factory Peugeots as 1–2 finishers on this event.

After Sainz's Argentinian win, McRae resumed his role as rally winner on the Acropolis and Safari rallies. The first success came despite initially being unexpectedly led on the stages by Märtin, who achieved on the landmark occasion of the fiftieth running of the fabled endurance event, and its last at World Rally Championship level, in retrospect proved to be the last career victory for McRae and British navigator Nicky Grist, ironically on the day on which the Scot became the first world championship driver to reach the quarter-century mark of individual WRC wins, and came to stand alone as the most successful driver in the history of the World Rally Championship.

In September 2002, Ford announced they would not be renewing McRae's contract - given his desire for a £5m contract, and the cost of developing the new 2003 car. Both McRae and Sainz joined the then less seasoned Sébastien Loeb at new championship full-timers, Citroën.

=== 2003 season ===
In the absence of the departed McRae and Sainz, Ford opted to promote their younger supporting drivers, Estonian Markko Märtin and Belgian François Duval, to their top two seats. A comparatively thorough redesign of the Focus debuted at the 2003 Rally New Zealand, where Märtin in particular proved immediately competitive, leading only to later be forced into retirement with engine problems. The team's new leader did score his first of five career rally victories on that year's Acropolis Rally, however, (notwithstanding a dramatic mid-stage moment for him and navigator Michael Park, when the car's bonnet unexpectedly flew up), as well as becoming only the third non-Scandinavian victor of the Rally Finland, formerly the 1,000 Lakes Rally.

The junior Duval, meanwhile, as had been publicly predicted by team boss Malcolm Wilson, secured a podium finish on this year's Tour de Corse, having scored his first ever podium finish earlier in the year in Turkey.

The two drivers finished the season in 4th and 9th places respectively in the drivers' standings.

=== 2004 season ===
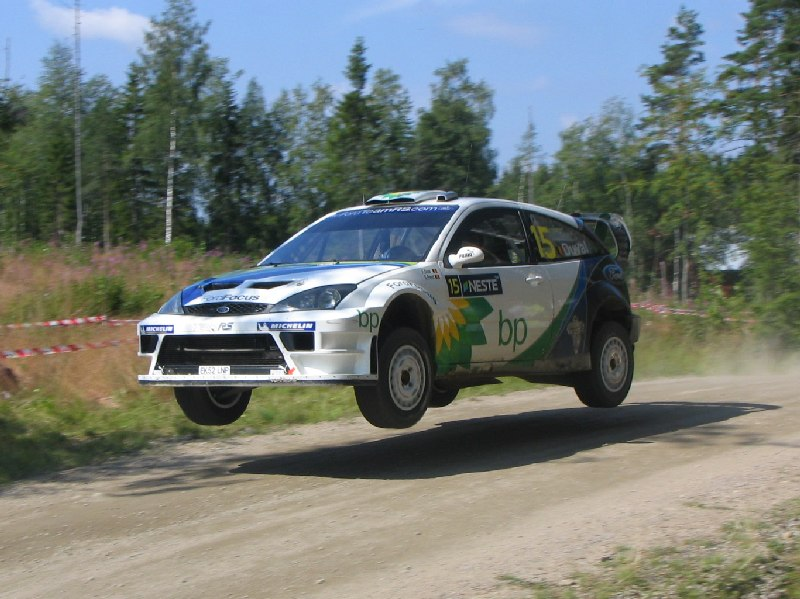
François Duval – 2004 Rally Finland

Märtin and Duval again drove the two works Fords in 2004. Märtin managed to win the French, Spanish and Mexican rallies, giving him third place in the overall championship. Both drivers left at the end of the season, to join Peugeot (Märtin) and Citroën (Duval).

=== 2005 season ===
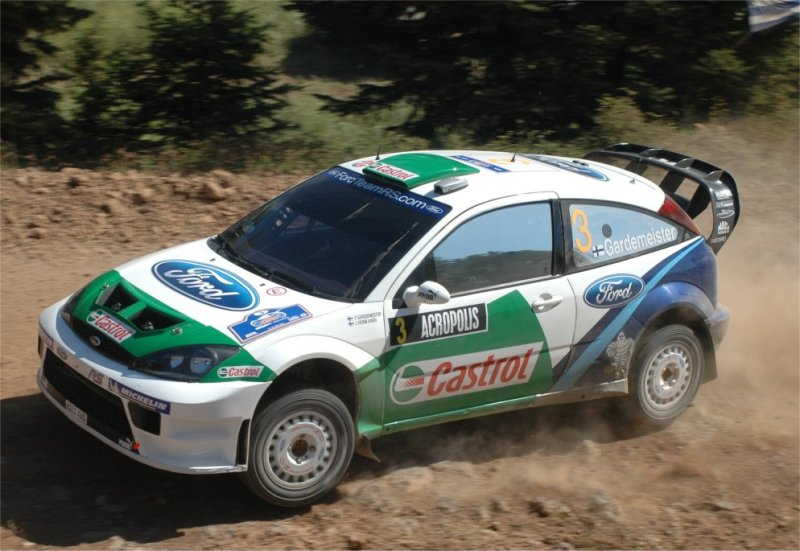
Toni Gardemeister steers his Focus RS WRC 04 through the rugged stages of the 2005 Acropolis Rally

The 2005 season saw Ford take on two relatively inexperienced drivers; Finn Toni Gardemeister and Czech Roman Kresta. Gardemeister achieved podiums at the Monte Carlo Rally, Rally Sweden, Acropolis Rally and the Tour de Corse. Kresta's best individual rally result was sixth, which he achieved on five events. The duo respectively finished in 4th and 8th places in the drivers' championship standings. The team also successfully introduced its 2006 car, the Ford Focus RS WRC 06 at the final rally of the year in Australia, where despite a few teething troubles, it was immediately quick as Gardemeister and Kresta both achieved a fastest stage time during the rally.

=== 2006 season ===
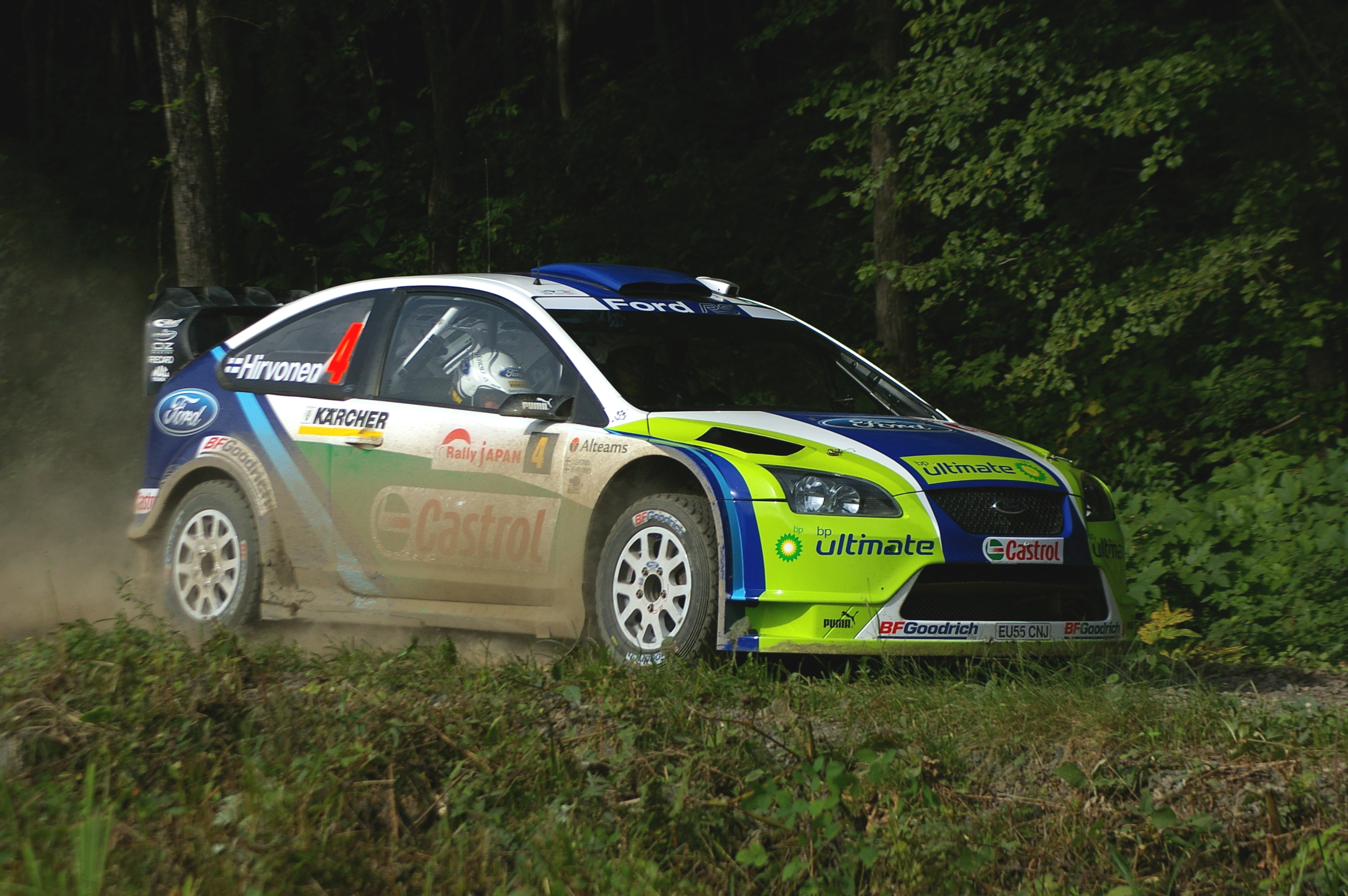
Mikko Hirvonen at the 2006 Rally Japan.

The team's entrants for the 2006 season are a new-look, all-Finnish team of 2000 and 2002 champion Marcus Grönholm, codriven by Timo Rautiainen, and the youngster Mikko Hirvonen, who renewed his link with the M-Sport run team for the first time since 2003, codriven by Jarmo Lehtinen. Grönholm joined the team from Peugeot, with whom, as planned, he ended his association after the joint withdrawal from the sport of both PSA Group marques. He won his first two events for the team, on the Monte Carlo Rally and the Swedish Rally, but was closely shadowed on both of them by the two-time champion and now driver with semi-works Kronos Citroën, Sébastien Loeb, who was soon to assert himself sufficiently in order to overtake the Finn in the points standings. Despite further victories, including Greece and Finland, Grönholm never regained the championship lead from the Frenchman and with the exception of Hirvonen in Australia, the two proved the only two drivers worthy of individual rally victories all season. Although with four rounds remaining and a 34-point lead, Loeb's injury from a mountain-biking accident shortly after the Cyprus Rally appeared to offer Grönholm a chance to close the deficit, the Finn's title challenge was finally mathematically ended with a crash on the penultimate round in Australia.

His team, however, were to benefit from Loeb's absence against a now weakened Kronos Citroën left to depend on their two inexperienced Spaniards, Xavier Pons and Daniel Sordo (although the team initially called upon Colin McRae to substitute for Loeb on their first event without him, in Turkey). Ford, already gaining on the points lead due to the combined proficiency on gravel of their two senior drivers, soon reclaimed a championship lead they were never to lose, achieving its greatest success in winning the manufacturer's title, the first such win for Ford since 1979.

=== 2007 season ===
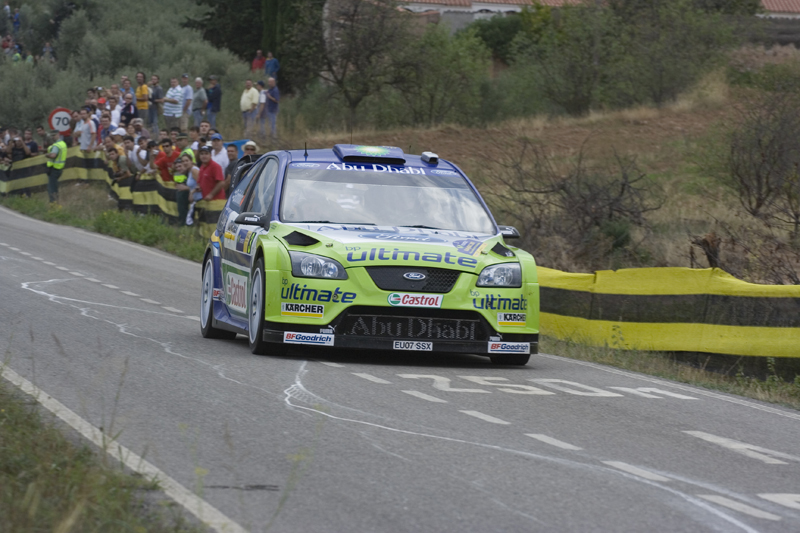
Marcus Grönholm – 2007 Rally Catalunya

The team's primary entrants for 2007 were unchanged from 2006. After watching his opponent of the previous year, Sébastien Loeb, return to winning ways on the official return of the 2003–2005 manufacturers' championship-winning factory Citroën team on the season's curtain-raiser in Monte Carlo, Grönholm followed up his own third place by winning for the first time that season in Sweden in February, and led his opponent, now driving a newly homologated Citroën C4 WRC, in the drivers' standings over the championship's post-Rally Finland summer break (an event also incidentally won by Grönholm, for a record-beating seventh time, to further extend his points lead).

Unfortunately for the drivers' championship ambitions of both the Blue Oval concern and Grönholm, however, having announced his impending retirement from WRC competition at the end of the season, the elder Finn was to suffer an early exit on Rally Japan. Grönholm then crashed his Focus (knocking himself briefly unconscious) on the tarmac stages of the inaugural Rally Ireland and penultimate round of the year. Combined with adversary Loeb winning, this meant Grönholm would surrender his championship lead, leaving him with an almost impossible points deficit to overhaul at the season-ending Wales Rally GB. It culminated in the Frenchman, settling for a safe third on the rally to the Finn's second, triumphing in the second long points duel between the pair in consecutive years. Ford, however, aided by supporting teammate Hirvonen's continued superiority on loose-surface events over his Citroën counterpart Daniel Sordo, sealed a successful defence of the Constructors' Championship. Meanwhile, Hirvonen, for his part, in addition to ending the season in style by topping the timesheets after the three days' competition in Wales, had also earlier taken his second and third career world rally victories in Norway and Japan.

At the half way stage of the 2007 World Rally Championship, a joint venture between BP-Ford and the Abu Dhabi Tourism Board was announced to bring a third official Ford Focus RS World Rally Car to the team's campaign. Khalid AlQassimi and co-driver Nicky Beech contested the Neste Oil Rally Finland, ADAC Rallye Deutschland, Rally RACC Catalunya-Costa Daurada and Rally Ireland.

For their work in the 2007 season, BP Ford and M-Sport received the Rally Business of the Year Award from the Motorsport Industry Association.

=== 2008 season ===
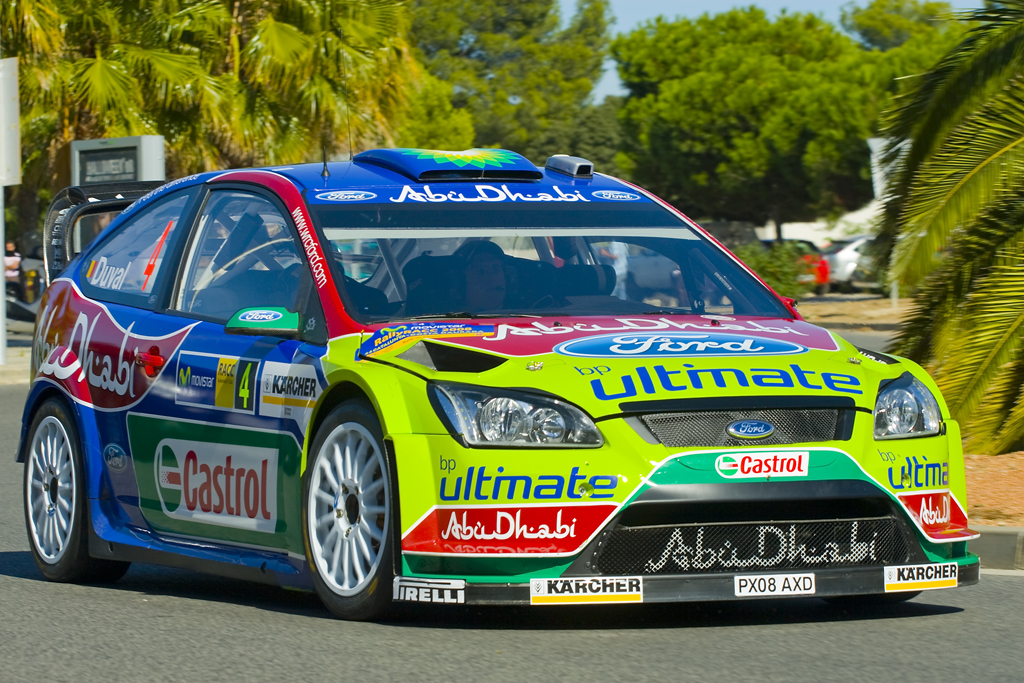
Ford Focus RS WRC 08

Mikko Hirvonen and co-driver Jarmo Lehtinen resumed the implicit role within the team of the Cumbria outfit's leading crew for the 2008 season, after Marcus Grönholm and co-driver Timo Rautiainen elected to retire following the 2007 season, with the more experienced Finn later to be found dabbling for Ford in rallycross and maintaining his links with the BP-Ford WRT team in an "ambassadorial role". Hirvonen was joined in the new-look M-Sport line-up by another fellow Finnish driver, Jari-Matti Latvala, who stepped into the vacant berth from his former spot at the satellite Stobart Ford team. Khalid Al Qassimi returned with a programme of ten events on the 2008 WRC calendar aboard a third car. His co-driver, Nicky Beech, was replaced by Michael Orr, former co-driver to Matthew Wilson.

The season got off to a promising start for both Finnish drivers, with Hirvonen taking second to Loeb on the Monte Carlo Rally in January, before Latvala beat Henri Toivonen's long-standing record as youngest World Rally Championship-qualifying event winner by outpacing Hirvonen to victory on the following Rally Sweden. Hirvonen collected his first win of the year on the Jordan Rally and led Latvala in a Ford 1–2 on Rally Turkey to assert a slender points lead over Citroën's Loeb heading into both Finns' home round of the Championship in August. Neither Hirvonen nor Latvala were able to defeat Loeb, with the Frenchman proceeding to record his eighth and ninth victories of the season on the New Zealand, Spanish and Corsican rallies. For the latter two, asphalt rounds, team boss Malcolm Wilson drafted in, in place of Latvala, one-time full-time pilot for the Ford team, Belgian François Duval, in order to maximise the team's points haul on a surface traditionally favourable to their French rivals.

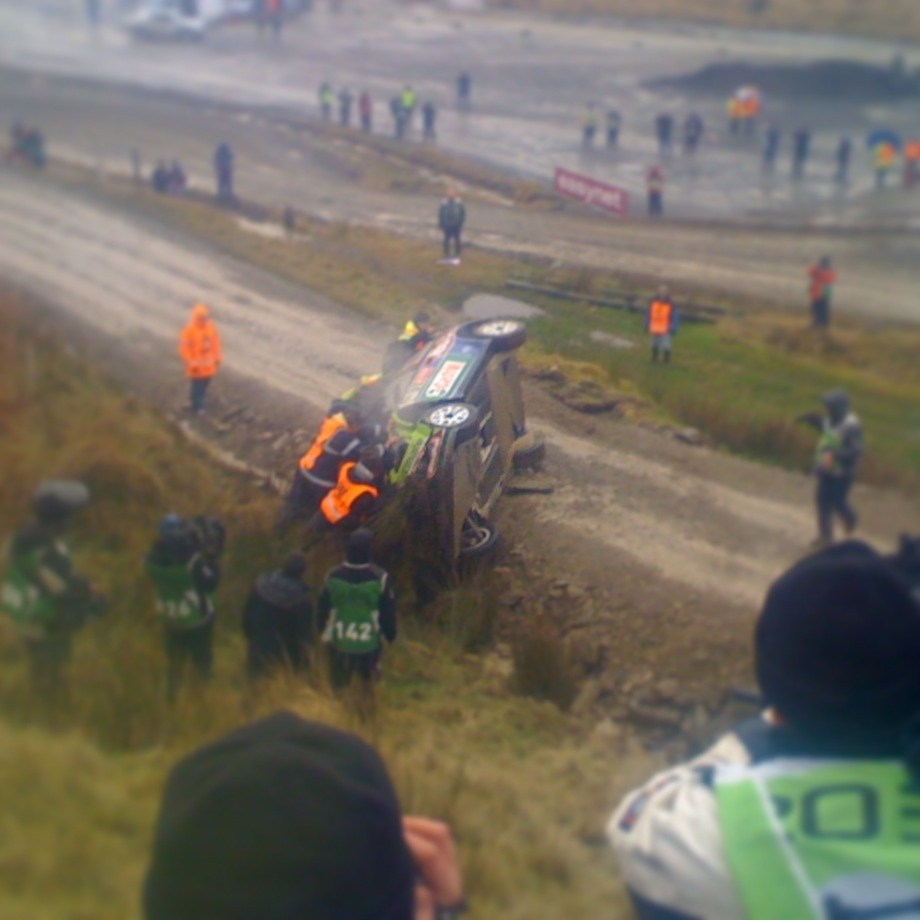
Hirvonen rolls on Wales Rally GB, 2008.

Although Hirvonen did return to winning form to head a Ford 1–2 with Latvala in Japan, it was at the same event where Loeb finished third to finally clinch the drivers' title, although the team did close in to within eleven points of Citroën in the manufacturers' title race, with a possible total of eighteen still available, as the season-ending Wales Rally GB loomed in December.

=== 2009 season ===
Hirvonen, Latvala and Al-Qassimi were retained in the team. Rival team Citroën got their season off to a good start, Sébastien Loeb winning all of the first five rallies. After finishing third in Ireland, Hirvonen scored four consecutive second-place finishes, but retired in Argentina with an engine problem. The team won their first rally of the season in Italy, Latvala beating Hirvonen. Hirvonen then took four consecutive victories, giving him a five-point lead over Loeb with two rounds to go. Hirvonen finished third in Spain and took a one-point championship lead to the finale in Great Britain. However, Loeb beat him to the victory in Britain, winning the championship. Hirvonen finished second in the standings, with Latvala fourth. Ford finished second in the Manufacturers' championship behind Citroën.

=== 2010 season ===
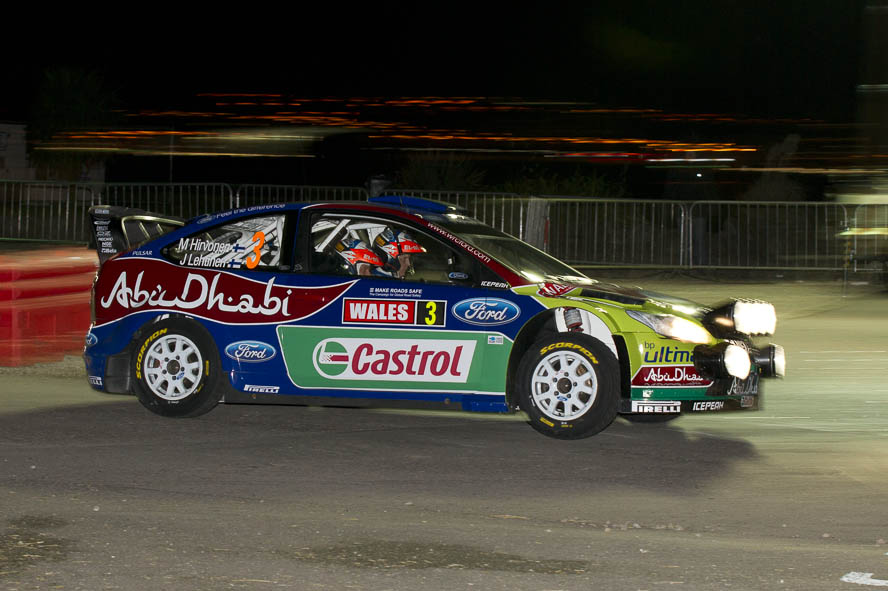
Mikko Hirvonen tackles a night stage on the 2010 Wales Rally GB

Hirvonen, Latvala and Al-Qassimi were retained again in the team for 2010. The team made a strong start, Hirvonen winning in Sweden with Latvala in third. However, the Fords struggled at the next round in Mexico, Hirvonen and Latvala only managing fourth and fifth respectively as Citroëns filled the podium. Hirvonen went off the road on the opening day of the Jordan Rally, but Latvala was fighting for victory. Both teams used tactics to determine the road order, Loeb eventually winning for Citroën. Hirvonen finished third in Turkey, while Latvala beat Sébastien Ogier to win in New Zealand after Loeb made errors and Hirvonen struggled for pace. Citroën filled the podium again in Portugal, Hirvonen the leading Ford in fourth.

=== 2011 season ===
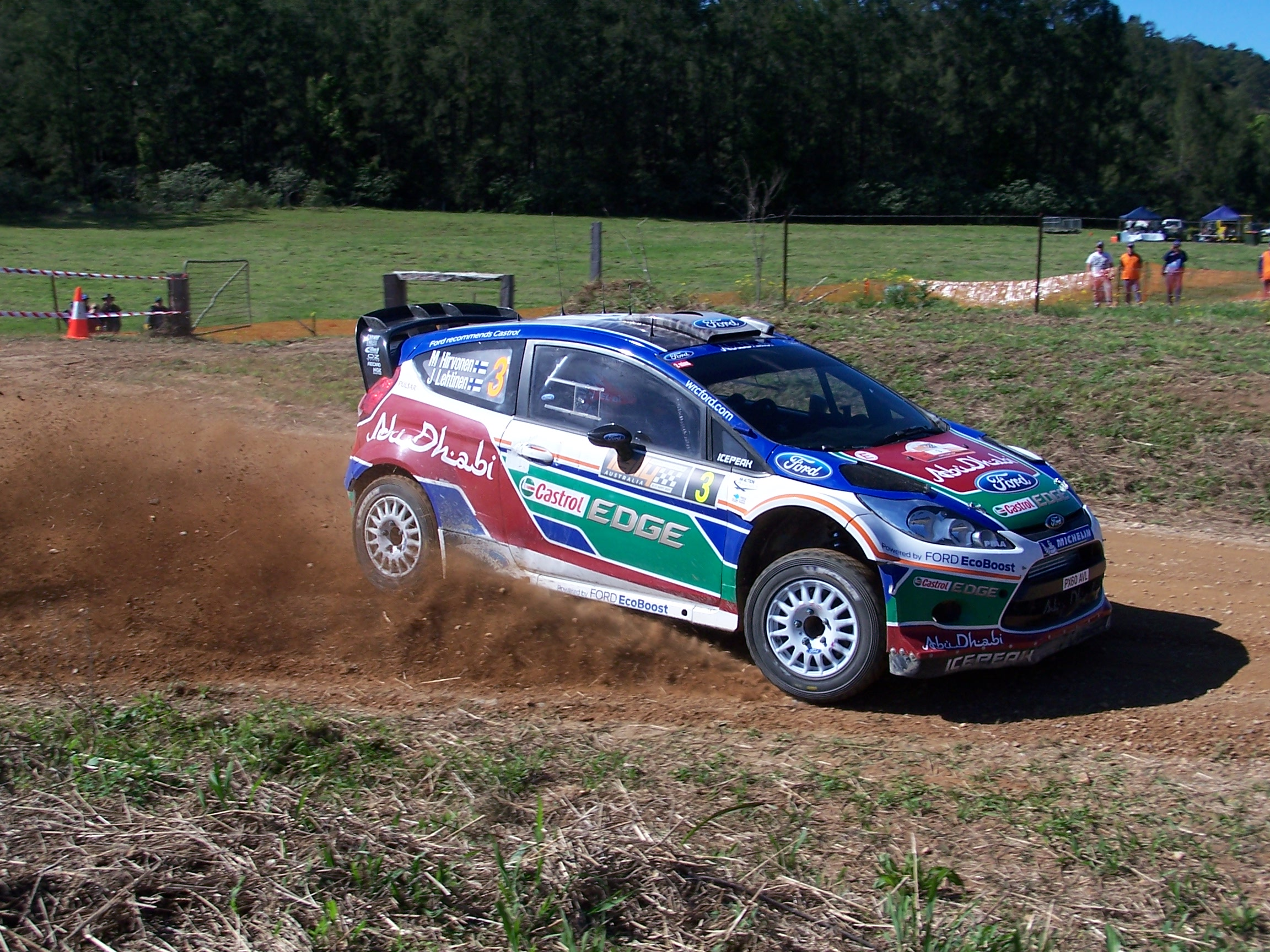
Mikko Hirvonen – 2011 Rally Australia

A change in the technical rules for the 2011 season meant that the Focus RS WRC had been replaced by the Fiesta RS WRC; the Fiesta name had not used by Ford for a rally car since the 1979 season, where Roger Clark and Ari Vatanen were entered for the Monte Carlo Rally. The new car retained the Abu Dhabi sponsorship that it had sported with the Focus, along with the driver line up of Mikko Hirvonen, Jari-Matti Latvala and Khalid Al-Qassimi. The main change from the new technical rules centred on the engine displacement; it being reduced from 2000cc turbo to 1600cc turbo, this reflected the changes being introduced to road cars at the same time.

The season started well, with Hirvonen winning the Swedish Rally, and Latvala finishing third, but Ford would have to wait until round 10 in Australia for the Fiesta to win again. Despite a promising start the Fiesta would only win three rallies during the season, the third victory being with Latvala in the legendary forests of Wales Rally GB. Hirvonen and Latvala would each achieve six additional podium finishes, allowing them to finish second and fourth in the driver's championships respectively. Ford finished second in the manufacturer-s championship, twenty-seven points behind eventual winners Citroën.

=== 2012 season ===
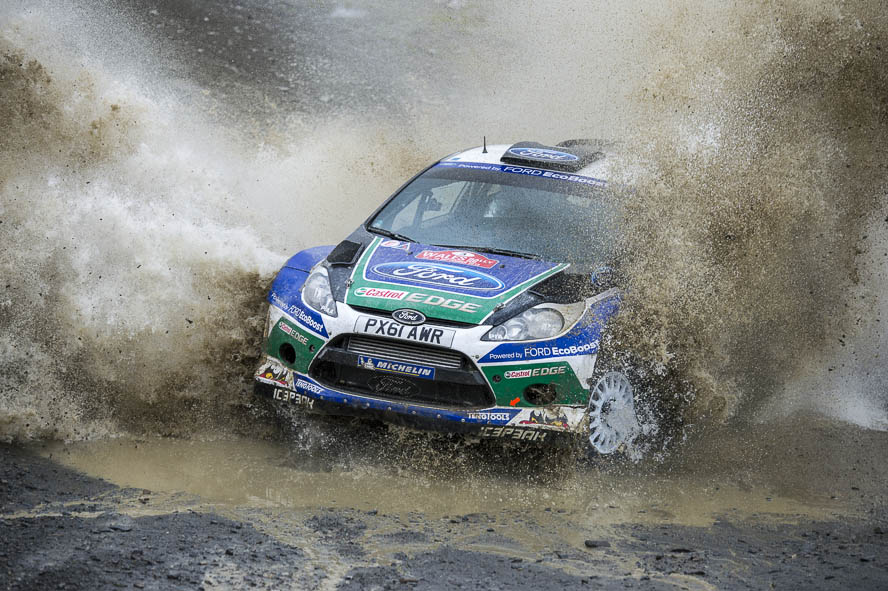
2012 Wales Rally GB water splash

Ford's participation in the World Rally Championship prior to the start of the 2012 season was in doubt due to the Great Recession, but an announcement at the eleventh hour was enough to secure their entry. The Abu Dhabi sponsorship deal had finished at the end of the 2011 season, and the Fiesta RS WRC now featured a predominantly Ford blue and white livery. Jari-Matti Latvala remained in the Ford stable and was now joined by 2003 champion Petter Solberg, who replaced the Citroën bound Mikko Hirvonen.

The season could have started very well for Ford; Latvala was leading the Monte-Carlo Rally with raw pace, until he crashed out, handing victory to Loeb. Latvala tried to make up for this error by winning the next round in Sweden, but he and Ford would not win again until the tenth round at Wales Rally GB. Solberg showed reasonable pace at the start of the season, adapting to a new car but in the end would never finish higher than third position. Dani Sordo also made an appearance for the Ford team at Rally Argentina, replacing Latvala who had been injured during training, he showed good pace, but retired on the final leg.

Latvala ended the season in third place, 116 points behind Loeb. Solberg finished in fifth place behind his younger compatriot, Mads Østberg. Ford again finished second behind Citroën in the manufacturers championship, another disappointing result for the blue oval brand. At the end of the 2012 season Ford announced that it would be ending its "sponsorship" of the Ford World Rally team, thus ending a seventeen-year link with the M-Sport squad.

=== Withdrawal from WRC as a World Rally Team ===
On 26 November 2012, M-Sport announced that sponsorship had been secured from the State of Qatar and that Mads Østberg and Nasser Al-Attiyah would be driving for the 2013 season. On 15 December 2012, M-Sport also announced that Evgeny Novikov and Thierry Neuville would be joining the Qatar M-Sport World Rally Team. Although the team competed with the Ford Fiesta RS WRC, and have received technical support from the Ford Motor Company, they were not classed as the Ford World Rally Team.

=== Return to WRC as World Rally Team ===
On October 1, 2026, Ford Racing announced that the Ford WRT would be returning to the World Rally Championship as a factory-backed team starting from the 2028 season.

== Gallery ==
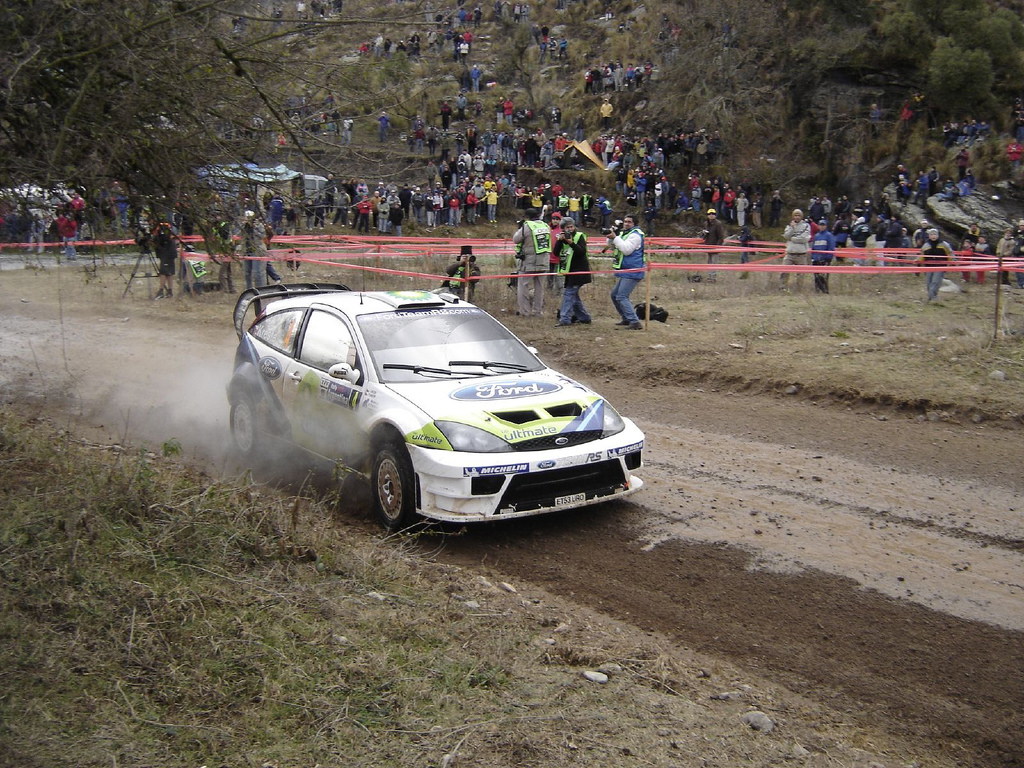
Roman Kresta driving the Focus RS WRC 04 at the 2005 Rally Argentina

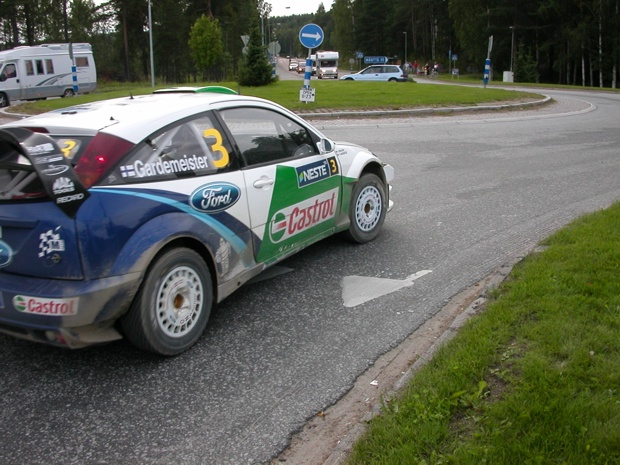
Gardemeister at the 2005 Rally Finland

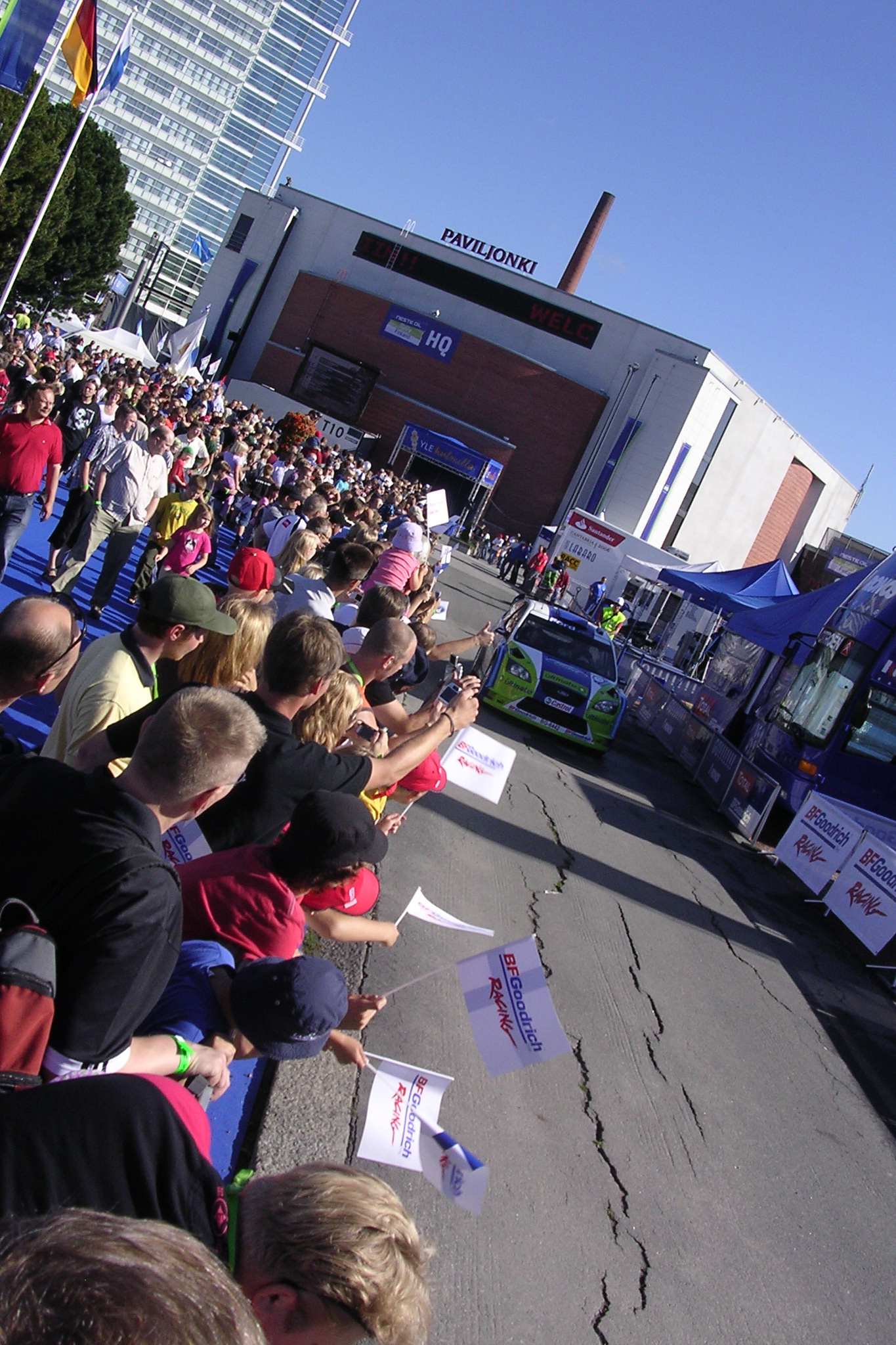
Marcus Grönholm drives through the service park during day 2 of the Neste Rally Finland in 2006

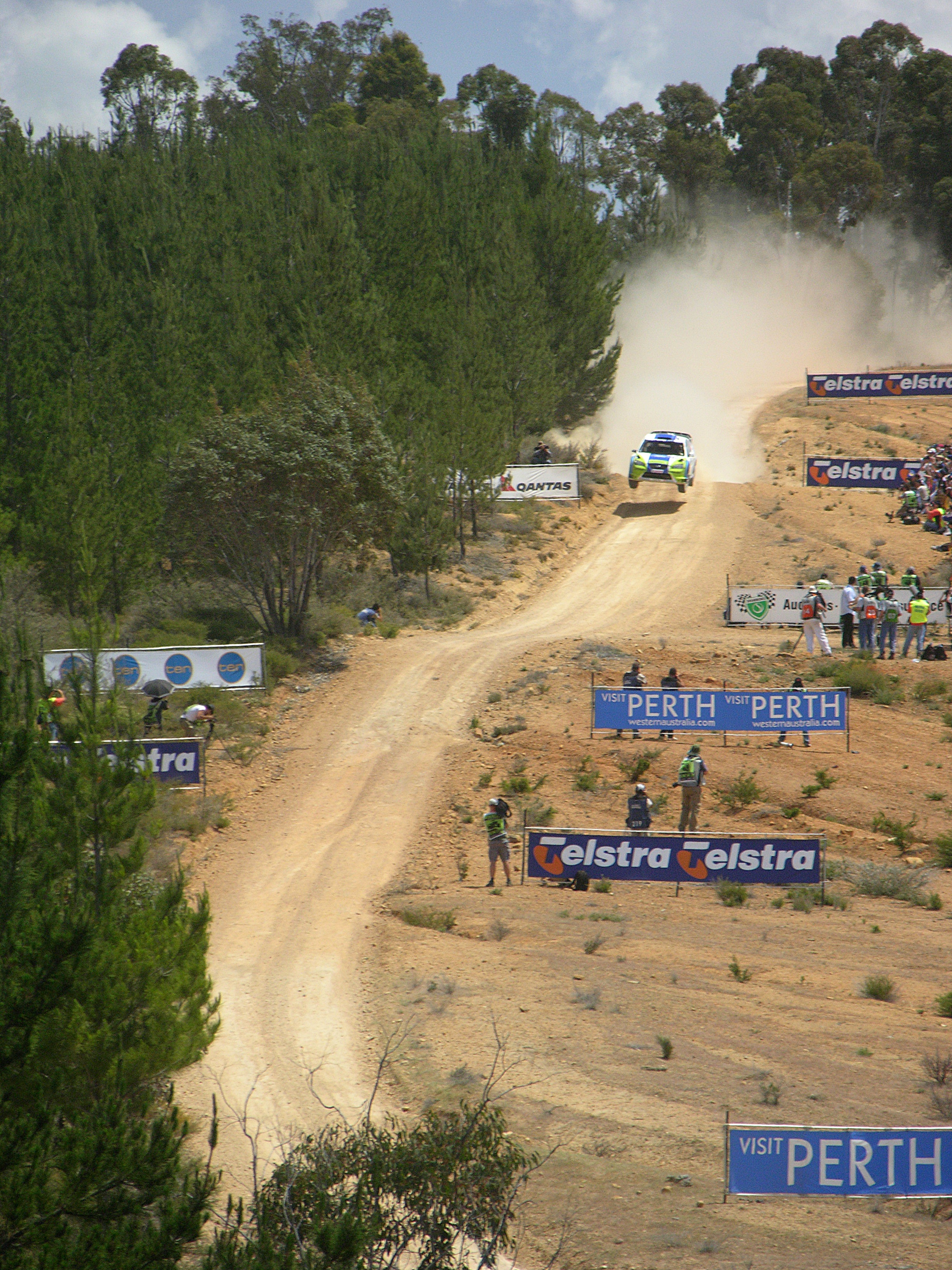
Marcus Grönholm makes his way over the Bunnings Jumps during the Telstra Rally Australia in 2006

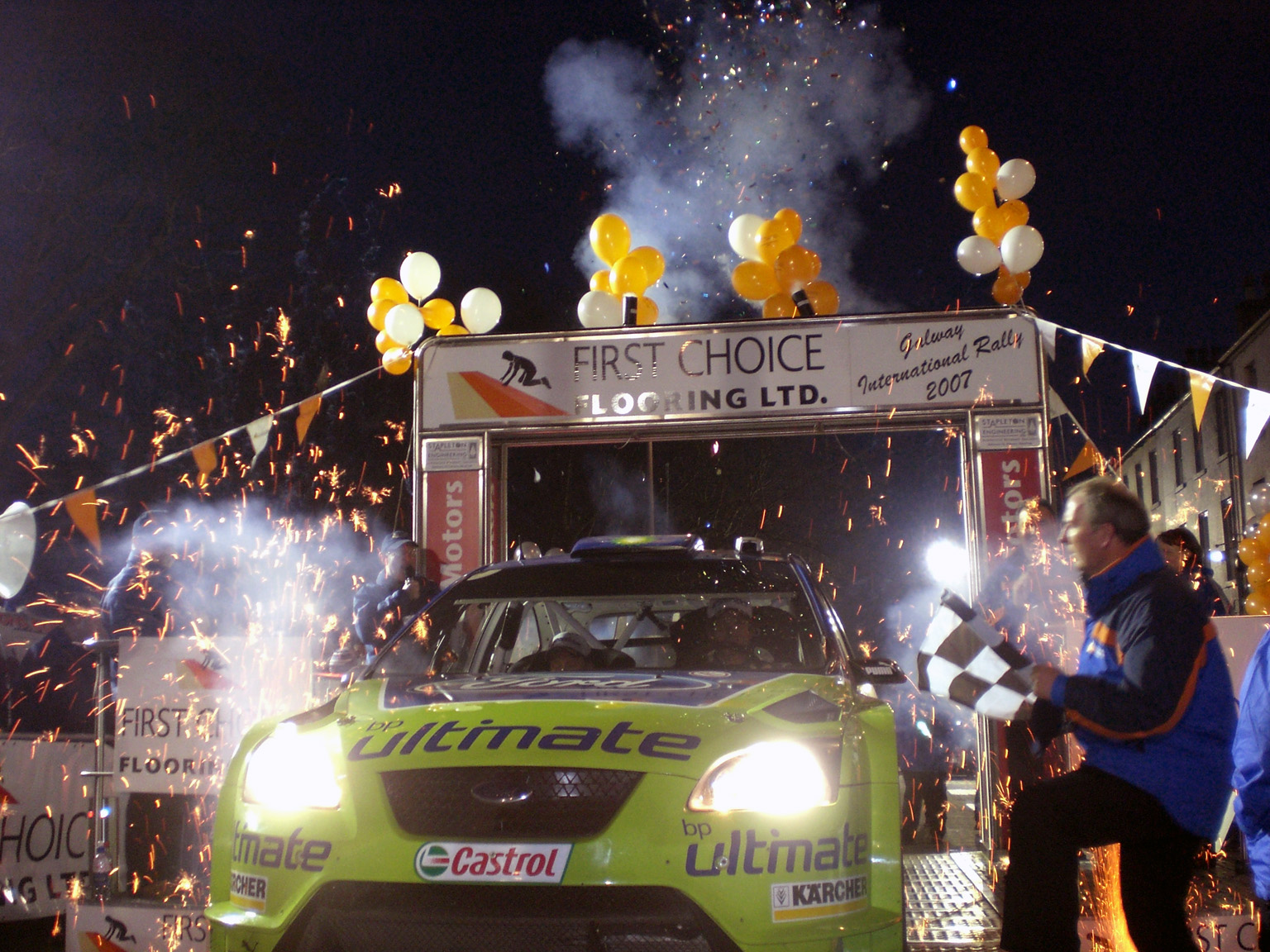
Grönholm at the finish of the 2007 Galway International Rally

== See also ==
- Ford Performance
- Ford Team RS
- Ford Focus RS WRC
- Ford Fiesta RS WRC
- M-Sport Ford World Rally Team
- Munchi's Ford World Rally Team
