= Tim O'Neil =

American rally racing driver

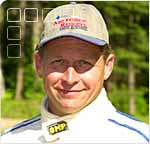
- Nationality: American

Rally America career
- Debut season: 1986
- Current team: Team O'Neil Motorsports
- Car number: 29
- Former teams: Mitsubishi, Volkswagen
- Starts: 9

Previous series
- SCCA ProRally

Championship titles
- 1989, 1992: SCCA ProRally Novice Champion, New England Champion, Production Champion, Group A Champion, Production GT Champion

Tim O'Neil is an American rally racing driver, and the winner of five production-based North American rally championships. He has driven both as a privateer, and as a factory driver for Volkswagen and Mitsubishi.

== Racing career ==
=== 1980s ===
O'Neil's first rallying experience was in 1986, racing a Saab 99 he had prepared, winning Canada's Novice of the Year. Prior to this he had raced stock cars, receiving rookie of the year honors in 1982. In 1987, he won the New England Division Championship. He was recruited by Volkswagen in 1988 to drive the Group A Golf GTI. During that year's Press On Regardless Rally, he led for over two days before getting stuck in a ditch on the last stage. He achieved his first overall victory at the Tall Pines Rally, clinching the Canadian Group A title.

He formed Team O'Neil Motorsport in 1989 as Volkswagen moved from Group A to the Production Class. He won six of the first eight SCCA National ProRally Championship Events, locking up both individual and manufacturer's championships by midseason. As North American Production Champion, he also became the first Production class driver to win overall at an SCCA national event and also won the Tall Pines Rally Overall in a Production class car.

=== 1990s ===
In 1990, O'Neil drove the AWD, supercharged Rallye Golf prototype to three overall wins and then became the first American in years to compete in Finland's 1000 Lakes Rally, a World Rally Championship event. In the same year, he used the car to set a record time of 7m, 45s in the Mount Washington Hillclimb Auto Race. In 1992, O'Neil was signed by Mitsubishi, and drove a Galant VR4 to win the National GT Championship as well as winning overall at a national SCCA rally with a Production GT car.

=== 2000s ===
O'Neil drove a United States Air Force Reserve sponsored Group N Subaru WRX to many National class wins in 2002. He then drove a 2002 Ford SVT Focus in the 2003 SCCA ProRally Championship season and had many podium finishes. This car was featured in the game Sega Rally 2006. At the end of the 2003 season, he announced a short retirement from competition to focus on developing his Rally School, the Team O'Neil Rally School in northern New Hampshire.

Tim spent much of the 2000s training rally drivers who later went on to win many national championships, including Travis Pastrana, Ken Block, Dave Mirra, and many more.

He began competing again in 2006, driving a Subaru WRX STI, in several events in the Rally America National Championship in 2006 and 2007.

Tim also became involved with organizing the New England Forest Rally in the late 2000s as well as organizing several other rally races in the northeast.

=== 2010s ===
Tim O'Neil continued developing the Team O'Neil Rally School as well as Team O'Neil Motorsports, a racing team that specializes in modifying production-based vehicles and has won many SCCA and Rally America National Championships.

During 2014, O'Neil drove EVSR, the fully electric racecar created by Entropy Racing, during Subaru's Climb to the Clouds Hillclimb at Mt Washington, NH. It was the first electric vehicle to compete in this event since its creation. Tim bested his old hill record with a time of 7:28. He now holds the fastest electric record at Mt. Washington.

== Rally School ==
O'Neil started the Tim O'Neil Rally School in 1997, after having spent several years coaching other rally drivers on techniques, most notably, the skill of left-foot braking.

== Complete Rally Results ==
=== SCCA ProRally Results ===
Year	Class	Car	1	2	3	4	5	6	7	8	9	10	DC	Points
1988	Group A	VW GTI	Chattahoochee Forest Rally; 3	Happy Trails PRO Rallye; DNP	Sunriser 400 Forest Rallyy; 3	Susquehannock Trail Performance Rally; DNF	Wild West PRO Rally; DNP	Ojibwe Forests Rally; 4	Press On Regardless; DNF	Coachmen Stages Rally; 1			*	*
1989	Production	VW GTI	Chattahoochee Forest Rally *	Sunriser 400 Forest Rallyy; 1	Pacific Forest Rally; 1	Rim of the World Rally; 1	Susquehannock Trail Performance Rally; 1	Ojibwe Forests Rally; 1	Press On Regardless Rally; DNF	Coachman Stages Rally; DNF			1	*
1990	Group A	VW GTI	Sunriser 400 Forest Rallyy; DNF	Rim of the World Rally; 1	Tiadaghton Trail PRO Rally; DNF	Susquehannock Trail Performance Rally; DNF	Ojibwe Forests Rally; DNP	Goldrush PRO Rally; DNP	Press On Regardless Rally; DNF	Coachman Stages Rally; 1			*	*
1991	Group A	VW GTI	Rim of the World Rally; DNF	Tiadaghton Trail PRO Rally; 2	Susquehannock Trail Performance Rally; DNF	Ojibwe Forests Rally; DNF	Goldrush PRO Rally; DNP	Press On Regardless Rally; DNP	Coachman Stages Rally; DNP	Maine Forest Rally; DNP			*	*
1992	PGT	Mitsubishi Galant VR-4	Big Bend Bash Divisional PRO Rally; DNP	Prescott Forest Rally; DNP	Rim of the World; DNP	Susquehannock Trail Performance Rally; DNF	Ojibwe Forests Rally; 1	Goldrush PRO Rally; 1	Press On Regardless Rally; DNF	Capital Forests Stages; 1	Maine Forest Rally; 1		1	80
2001	Production	Subaru Impreza WRX	Sno*Drift ProRally; DNP	Cherokee Trails ProRally; DNP	Rim of the World; DNP	Oregon Trail Rally; DNP	Susquehannock Trail Performance Rally; 3	Maine Forest Rally; 1	Ojibwe Forests ProRally; DNP	Wild West ProRally; DNP	Prescott Forest ProRally; DNP	Lake Superior ProRally; DNP	12	14
2003	Open	Ford Focus	Sno*Drift ProRally; DNF	Rim of the World Rally; 5	Susquehannock Trail Performance Rally; 2	Pikes Peak International Hill Climb; 3	Oregon Trail Rally; 2	Maine Forest Rally; DNF	Ojibwe Forests ProRally; 5	Wild West ProRally; DNF	Lake Superior ProRally; 8		4	76
2004	Open	Subaru Impreza WRX STi	Sno*Drift ProRally; DNP	Oregon Trail Rally; DNP	Rim of the World Rally; DNP	Susquehannock Trail Performance Rally; DNP	Pikes Peak International Hill Climb; DNP	Maine Forest Rally; DNP	Ojibwe Forests ProRally; DNP	Colorado Cog; DNP	Lake Superior ProRally; 2		17	17

- Limited Data was available for this year.

=== Rally America Results ===
Year	Class	Car	1	2	3	4	5	6	7	8	9	DC	Points
2006	Open	Subaru Impreza WRX STi	Sno*Drift; DNP	Rally in the 100 Acre Wood; DNP	Oregon Trail; DNP	Susquehannock Trail Performance Rally; DNP	Maine Forest Rally; DNP	Ojibwe Forests Rally; DNP	Colorado Cog; DNP	Lake Superior Rally; 2	Wild West Rally; DNP	18	17
2007	Open	Subaru Impreza WRX STi	Sno*Drift; DNP	Rally in the 100 Acre Wood; DNP	Oregon Trail; DNP	Olympus Rally; DNP	Susquehannock Trail Performance Rally; DNP	New England Forest Rally; 6	Ojibwe Forests Rally; DNP	Rally Colorado; DNP	Lake Superior Rally; DNP	22	8
2008	2 Wheel Drive	Mazdaspeed3	Sno*Drift; DNP	Rally in the 100 Acre Wood; DNP	Oregon Trail; DNP	Olympus Rally; DNP	Susquehannock Trail Performance Rally; DNP	New England Forest Rally; DNF	Ojibwe Forests Rally; DNP	Rally Colorado; DNP	Lake Superior Rally; DNP	18	1
