= SCCA ProRally =

US rally racing series from 1973 to 2004

- Category: Rallying
- Country: United States
- Inaugural season: 1973
- Folded: 2004

SCCA ProRally was an American rally racing series, run by the Sports Car Club of America from 1973 until 2004. The SCCA discontinued it for 2005, due to concerns about safety and insurance. It allowed Rally America to replace it, utilizing most of the same venues and existing infrastructure.

== Rallies ==
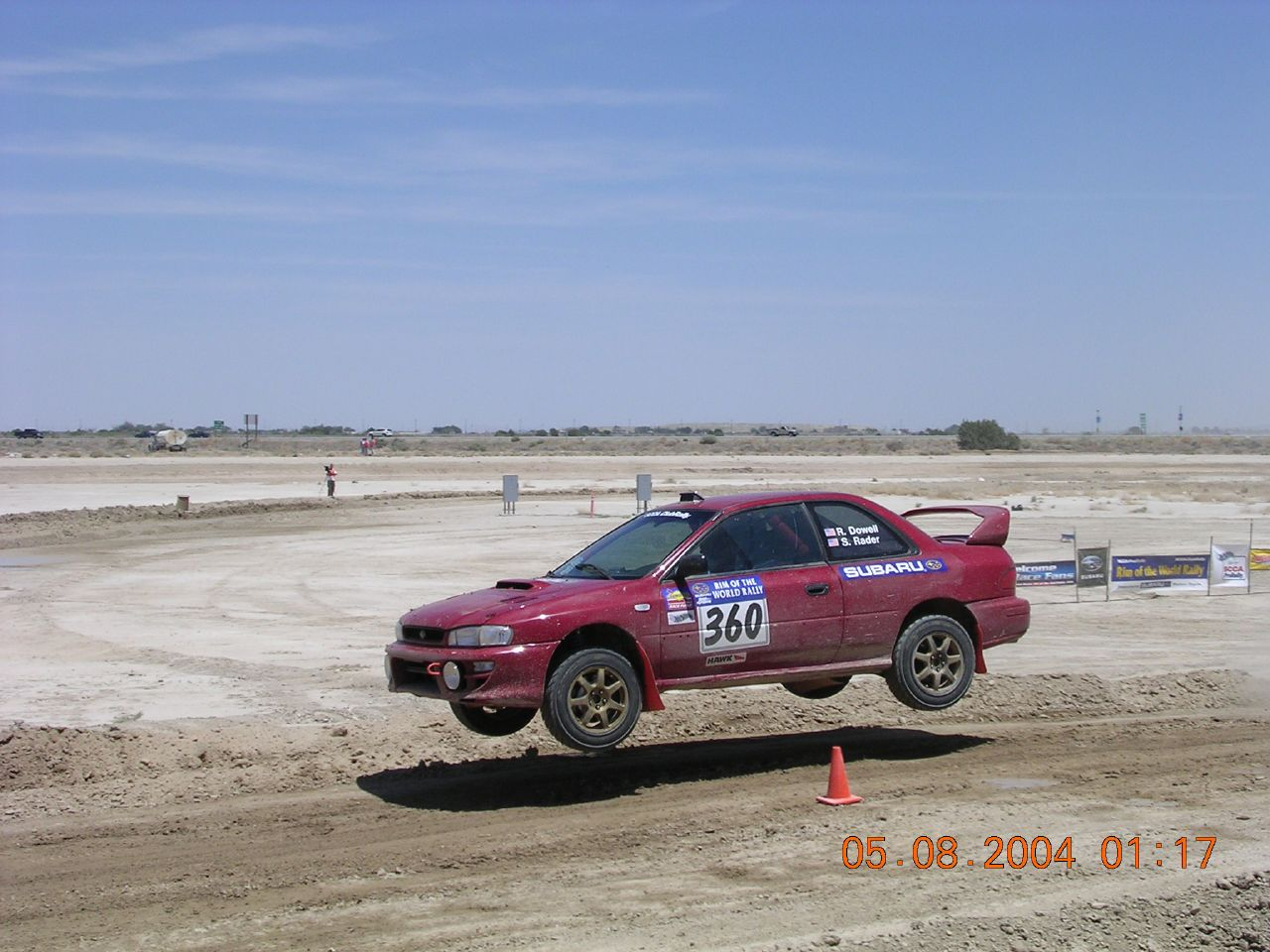
Competitor at the 2004 Rim of the World ProRally

Rallies which were included on the SCCA ProRally calendar include:

- Rally in the 100 Acre Wood 1977–1983, 2002
- Big Bend Bash 1973–1976, 1978–1982, 1992
- Cherokee Trails Rally 2001, 2002
- Chisum Trail PRO Rally 1976 (Unofficial) 1978–1982
- Doo Wops III/IV Rally 1994–1999
- Happiness Is Sunrise Rally 1974–1975, 1979–1980
- Lake Superior Rally 1994–2004
- Maine Forest Rally, Summer 1994–2004, Winter 1991–1997, 2002
- Mojave 24 Hours Rally 1974–1977
- Nor'Wester Rally 1973–1978, 1981–1986
- Ojibwe Forests Rally 1986–2004
- Olympus Rally 1973–1975, 1980–1987
- Oregon Trail Rally 1984, 2000–2004
- Pikes Peak Hillclimb 2002–2004
- Prescott Forest Rally 1992–2001
- Press-on-Regardless Rally 1975, 1977–1993
- Rim of the World 1989–2004
- Sand Hills Sandblast Rally 1994–1996
- Sno*Drift 1973–1975, 1980, 1981, 1983, 1997–2004
- Sunriser 400 Forest Rally 1973–1975, 1977–1979, 1981, 1984–1985, 1987–1990, 1994–1996
- Susquehannock Trail Performance Rally 1977–2004
- Wild West Rally 1985, 1987–1988, 1993–1994, 1996–2003

NOTE: The series was given the name "SCCA Pro Rally Series" in 1972. This name was used until 1998. In 1999 SCCA trademarked the term "ProRally," which was used thereafter.

== Champions ==
Championships were awarded to drivers and co-drivers based on finishes in several classes. An overall champion, based on overall finishes was also awarded. From 1998 until 2004 a separate championship was awarded to the best-placed 2 wheel drive team, regardless of class.

Year	Driver	Co-Driver	Manufacturer
1973	(United States) Scott Harvey	(United States) Wayne Zitkus	not awarded
1974	(United States) Gene Henderson	(United States) Ken Pogue	not awarded
1975	(United States) John Buffum	(United States) Vicki Dykema	(Japan) Datsun
1976	(United States) Hendrik Blok	(United States) Erick Hauge	(Japan) Datsun
1977	(United States) John Buffum	(United States) Vicki Dykema	(United States) Chrysler (Japan) Datsun
1978	(United States) John Buffum	(United States) Doug Shepherd	(Japan) Datsun
1979	(United States) John Buffum	(United States) Mark Howard	(Japan) Datsun
1980	(United States) John Buffum	(United States) Doug Shepherd	(United Kingdom) Triumph
1981	(New Zealand) Rod Millen	(United States) R.Dale Kraushaar	(Japan) Mazda
1982	(United States) John Buffum	(United States) Doug Shepherd	(Germany) Audi
1983	(United States) John Buffum	(United States) Doug Shepherd	(Germany) Audi
1984	(United States) John Buffum	(United States) R.Dale Kraushaar	(Germany) Audi
1985	(United States) John Buffum	(United States) Tom Grimshaw	(Japan) Mazda
1986	(United States) John Buffum	(United States) Tom Grimshaw	(Germany) Audi
1987	(United States) John Buffum	(United States) Tom Grimshaw	(Germany) Audi
1988	(New Zealand) Rod Millen	(United States) Harry Ward	(Japan) Mazda
1989	(New Zealand) Rod Millen	(New Zealand) Tony Sircombe	(Japan) Mazda
1990	(United States) Paul Choiniere	(United States) Cal Coatsworth	(Germany) Audi
1991	(United States) Chad DiMarco	(United States) Erick Hauge	(Japan) Subaru
1992	(United States) Paul Choiniere	(United States) Jeff Becker	(Germany) Audi
1993	(United States) Paul Choiniere	(United States) Jeff Becker	(Germany) Audi
1994	(United States) Paul Choiniere	(United States) Jeff Becker	(Germany) Audi
1995	(United States) Paul Choiniere	(United States) Jeff Becker	(Japan) Mitsubishi
1996	(United States) Paul Choiniere	(United States) Jeff Becker	(South Korea) Hyundai
1997	(United States) Paul Choiniere	(United States) Jeff Becker	(South Korea) Hyundai
1998	(Jamaica) David Summerbell	(Jamaica) Michael Fennell	(South Korea) Hyundai
1999	(United Kingdom) Noel Lawler	(Republic of Ireland) Charles Bradley	(South Korea) Hyundai
2000	(United States) Paul Choiniere	(United States) Jeff Becker	(South Korea) Hyundai
2001	(United Kingdom) Mark Lovell	(United States) Frank Cunningham	(Japan) Subaru
2002	(United Kingdom) David Higgins	(United Kingdom) Steve Turvey	(South Korea) Hyundai
2003	(United Kingdom) David Higgins	(United Kingdom) Daniel Barritt	(Japan) Mitsubishi
2004	(Canada) Patrick Richard	(Canada) Nathalie Richard	not awarded
