= Mark Lovell (rally driver) =

British rally driver (1960–2003)

Personal information
- Nationality: (United Kingdom) British
- Full name: Mark Johnathon Lovell
- Born: 27 March 1960; Axbridge, Somerset, England
- Died: 12 July 2003 (aged 43); Hillsboro, Oregon, United States

World Rally Championship record
- Years active: 1982–1989
- Co-driver: (United Kingdom) Peter Davis (United Kingdom) Roger Freeman (United Kingdom) Terry Harryman (Republic of Ireland) Ronan Morgan
- Teams: Ford
- Rallies: 11
- Championships: 0
- Rally wins: 0
- Podiums: 0
- Stage wins: 0
- Total points: 0
- First rally: 1982 RAC Rally
- Last rally: 1989 RAC Rally

Mark Johnathon Lovell (27 March 1960 – 12 July 2003) was a British rally driver. He won the 1986 British Rally Championship in a Ford RS200 Group B, the 1987 and 1988 Irish Tarmac Rally Championship, the 1988 International Dutch Rally Drivers' Championship and the 2001 SCCA ProRally Drivers' Championship in the United States. He also won the 2003 Pikes Peak Rally only two weeks before his death.

When the Subaru Impreza WRX and the Mitsubishi Lancer Evolution were introduced in 2002 and 2003 to the United States, both cars created more interest in the sport of rallying. Subaru and subsequently Mitsubishi entered the US Pro Rally championship with factory teams; Lovell was the lead driver for the Subaru / Prodrive team, with Americans Karl Scheible (2002) and Ramana Lagemann (2003) as teammates.

Lovell and his co-driver Roger Freeman were both killed in July 2003 during the Oregon Trail Rally when their Works ProRally Subaru Impreza WRX left the road and struck a tree at high speed shortly after the start of the first stage.

A memorial page for both Lovell and Freeman has been set up, which includes many photographs of the team and events at both the Pikes Peak and Oregon Trail Pro Rallies.

== Racing record ==
=== Complete WRC results ===
Year	Entrant	Car	1	2	3	4	5	6	7	8	9	10	11	12	13	WDC	Pts
1982	Passey & Porter Ltd	Ford Escort RS2000	MON	SWE	POR	KEN	FRA	GRC	NZL	BRA	FIN	ITA	CIV	GBR; Ret		NC	0
1983	British Junior Rally Team	Ford Escort RS1600	MON	SWE	POR	KEN	FRA	GRC	NZL	ARG	FIN	ITA	CIV	GBR; 23		NC	0
1984	British Junior Rally Team	Ford Escort RS1600	MON	SWE; Ret	POR	KEN	FRA	GRC	NZL	ARG	FIN	ITA	CIV			NC	0
1984	British Citroën	Citroën Visa 1000 Pistes												GBR; 12		NC	0
1985	British Junior Rally Team	Ford Escort RS1600	MON	SWE; 24	POR	KEN	FRA	GRC	NZL	ARG	FIN	ITA	CIV			NC	0
1985	British Junior Rally Team	Ford Escort RS Turbo												GBR; Ret		NC	0
1986	Ford Motor Company Ltd	Ford RS200	MON	SWE	POR	KEN	FRA	GRE	NZL	ARG	FIN	CIV	ITA	GBR; Ret	USA	NC	0
1987	British Telecom Radiopaging	Ford Sierra RS Cosworth	MON	SWE	POR	KEN	FRA	GRE	USA	NZL	ARG	FIN	CIV	ITA	GBR; Ret	NC	0
1988	Ford Motor Company Ltd	Ford Sierra RS Cosworth	MON	SWE	POR	KEN	FRA	GRC	USA	NZL	ARG	FIN	CIV	ITA	GBR; 17	NC	0
1989	Ford Motor Company Ltd	Ford Sierra RS Cosworth	SWE	MON	POR	KEN	FRA; Ret	GRC	NZL	ARG	FIN	AUS	ITA	CIV		NC	0
1989	Andrews Sykes Ford Champions Team	Ford Sierra RS Cosworth													GBR; 17	NC	0

== Titles ==
- RACMSA British Rally Championship – 1986 winner, with Roger Freeman in a Ford RS200 Group B.
- Irish Tarmac Rally Championship – 1987 winner, with Roger Freeman in a Ford Sierra RS Cosworth, and 1988 winner, with Terry Harryman in a Ford Sierra RS Cosworth.
- Dutch Rally Championship – 1988
- SCCA ProRally Championship – 2001, with Steve Turvey & Mike Kidd in a Subaru Impreza WRX Works car

== Awards ==
- Autosport Magazine's British Rally Driver of the Year, 1985

Awards and achievements
Preceded by David Llewellin	Autosport; National Rally Driver of the Year; 1985	Succeeded by Ken Wood
