= Mark van Eldik =

Dutch rally driver (born 1967

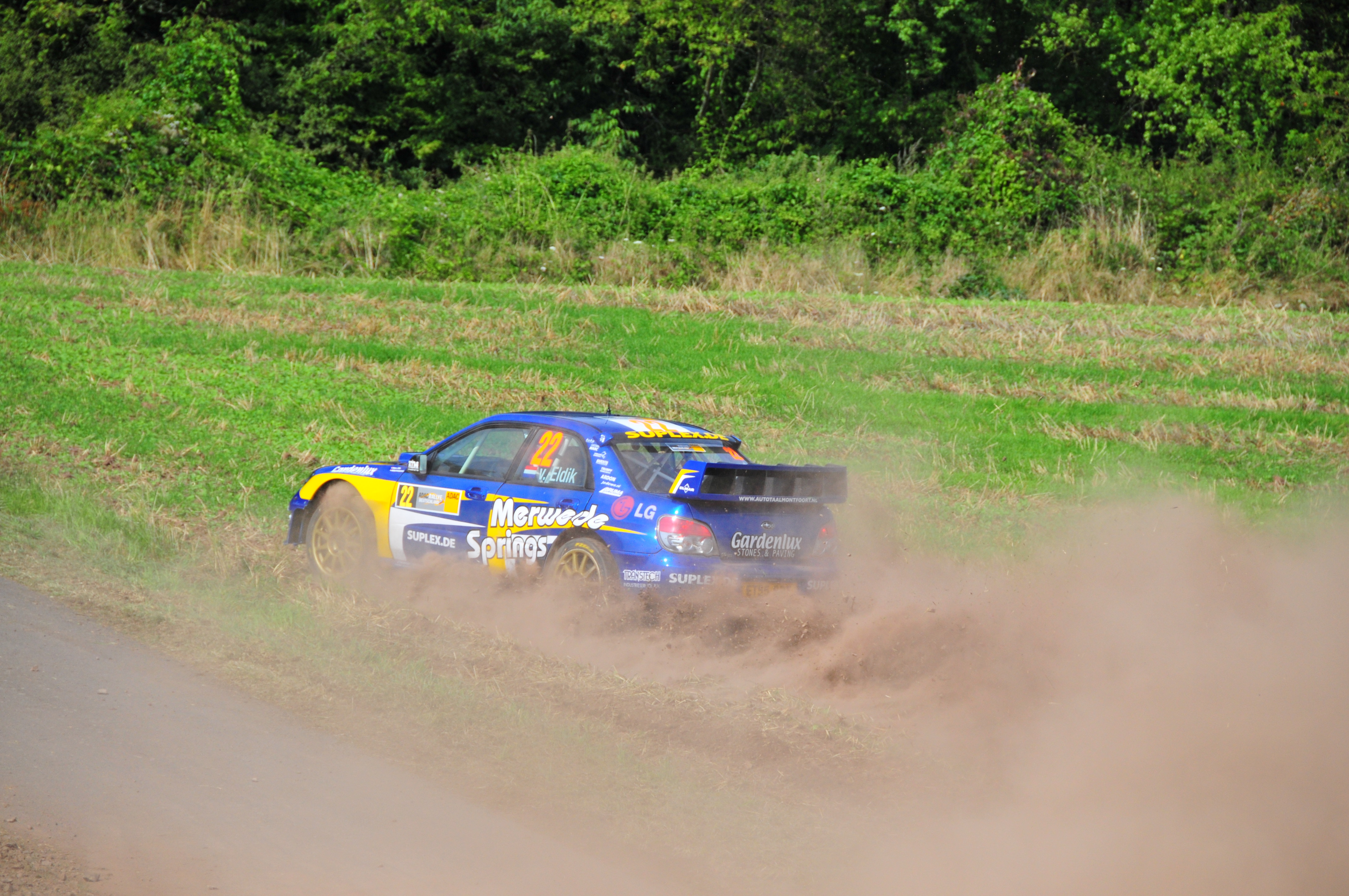
- van Eldik at the 2008 Rallye Deutschland

Personal information
- Nationality: Dutch

World Rally Championship record
- Years active: 2005–present
- Rallies: 9
- Championships: 0
- Rally wins: 0
- Podiums: 0
- Stage wins: 0
- Total points: 2
- First rally: 2005 Rally Catalunya

Mark van Eldik (born 1967) is a Dutch rally driver, who scored World Rally Championship points on the 2010 Rallye Deutschland with a ninth-place finish.

== Career ==
Van Eldik began rallying in 2002, competing in Dutch national events. In 2005, he made his World Rally Championship debut on Rally Catalunya, finishing 29th overall in his Group N Mitsubishi Lancer Evolution VIII. In 2006, he purchased a Subaru Impreza S8 WRC, which he then replaced with a newer S10 version later in the year. He competed in that car on the 2006 Rallye Deutschland, where he finished 24th overall. At the end of the year, he competed in Wales Rally GB in a Group N Mitsubishi, finishing 41st.

For 2007, van Eldik purchased an Impreza S12 from Prodrive, which he used to take the Dutch championship title. He also finished 26th on the 2007 Rally Deutschland, retired with mechanical failure on the 2007 Rally Catalunya and finished 34th on the 2007 Wales Rally GB. In 2008, van Eldik competed on just the one WRC event, 2008 Rallye Deutschland, where he finished 23rd. In 2009, he competed in both an Impreza S14 WRC and a Mitsubishi Lancer WRC 05. In 2010 he has also used a Škoda Fabia S2000, in which he retired from the 2010 Ypres Rally. At the 2010 Rallye Deutschland, van Eldik scored his best WRC result to date with a ninth-place finish, also picking up two world championship points.

== Career results ==
=== WRC results ===
Year	Entrant	Car	1	2	3	4	5	6	7	8	9	10	11	12	13	14	15	16	WDC	Pts
2005	Mark van Eldik	Mitsubishi Lancer Evolution VIII	MON	SWE	MEX	NZL	ITA	CYP	TUR	GRC	ARG	FIN	GER	GBR	JPN	FRA	ESP; 29	AUS	NC	0
2006	Mark van Eldik	Subaru Impreza WRC	MON	SWE	MEX	ESP	FRA	ARG	ITA	GRC	GER; 24	FIN	JPN	CYP	TUR	AUS	NZL		NC	0
2006	Mark van Eldik	Mitsubishi Lancer Evolution VIII																GBR; 41	NC	0
2007	Mark van Eldik	Subaru Impreza WRC	MON	SWE	NOR	MEX	POR	ARG	ITA	GRE	FIN	GER; 26	NZL	ESP; Ret	FRA	JPN	IRE	GBR; 34	NC	0
2008	Mark van Eldik	Subaru Impreza WRC	MON	SWE	MEX	ARG	JOR	ITA	GRE	TUR	FIN	GER; 23	NZL	ESP	FRA	JPN	GBR		NC	0
2010	Mark van Eldik	Subaru Impreza WRC 08	SWE	MEX	JOR	TUR	NZL	POR	BUL	FIN	GER; 9	JPN	FRA	ESP	GBR				22nd	2
2016	Wevers Sport	Škoda Fabia R5	MON	SWE	MEX	ARG	POR	ITA	POL	FIN	GER; 25	FRA	ESP	GBR	AUS				NC	0
