= 2006 Rally México =

Rallying motorsport event

2006 Rally México 20º Corona Rally México
Round 3 of the 2006 World Rally Championship
← Previous event	Next event →
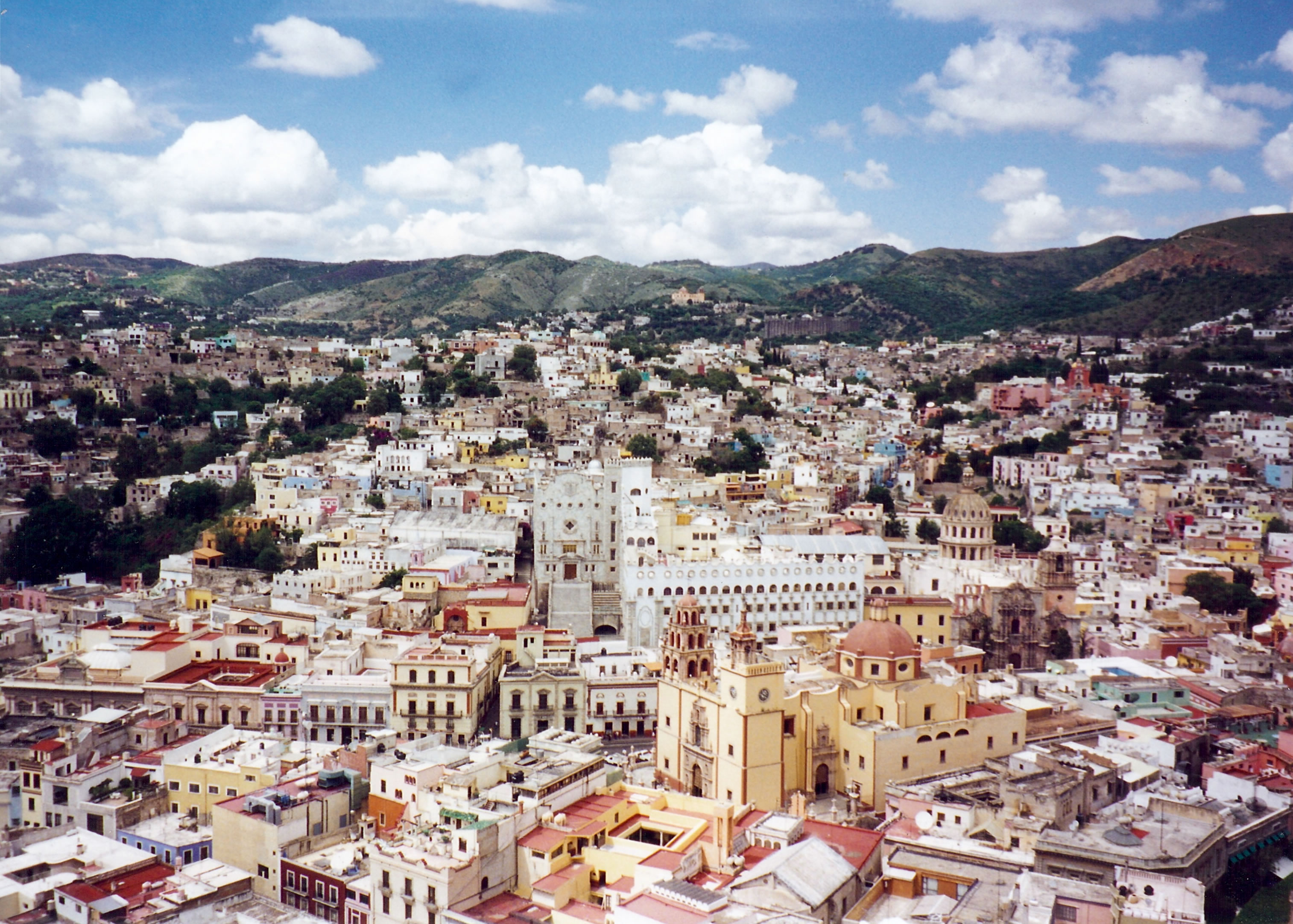
- A view of Guanajuato, home to two stages of Rally Mexico
- Host country: Mexico
- Rally base: Leon
- Dates run: March 3 – 5 2006
- Stages: 17 (359.54 km; 223.41 miles)
- Stage surface: Gravel
- Overall distance: 1,002.47 km (622.91 miles)

Statistics
- Crews: 39 at start, 34 at finish

Overall results
- Overall winner: (France) Sébastien Loeb (Belgium) Kronos Total Citroën World Rally Team

The 20º Corona Rally México, the third round of the 2006 World Rally Championship season took place from March 3–5, 2006.

== Event ==
The event saw the first win of the season for Sébastien Loeb. After a spirited battle with Petter Solberg over the first two days - that saw both drivers suffering problems(Loeb losing power steering on stage 13 and Solberg's Subaru colliding with a dog) - Loeb eventually pulled clear to give the Belgian Kronos team their first WRC victory. Marcus Grönholm had a less successful event, suffering a crash on day one and having to rejoin the rally on day two under Superally rules. Despite a twenty-minute penalty, he managed to pick up a point for eighth place. Manfred Stohl collected the final podium place with his Peugeot 307.

== Results ==
Pos.	Driver	Co-driver	Car	Time	Difference	Points
WRC
1.	(France) Sébastien Loeb	(Monaco) Daniel Elena	Citroën Xsara WRC	3:47:08.8	0.0	10
2.	(Norway) Petter Solberg	(United Kingdom) Phil Mills	Subaru Impreza WRC 2006	3:47:57.7	48.9	8
3.	(Austria) Manfred Stohl	(Austria) Ilka Minor	Peugeot 307 WRC	3:51:47.9	4:39.1	6
4.	(Spain) Dani Sordo	(Spain) Marc Martí	Citroën Xsara WRC	3:52:36.5	5:27.7	5
5.	(Norway) Henning Solberg	(Norway) Cato Menkerud	Peugeot 307 WRC	3:59:44.2	12:35.4	4
6.	(Republic of Ireland) Gareth MacHale	(Republic of Ireland) Paul Nagle	Ford Focus RS WRC 04	4:03:11.1	16:02.3	3
7.	(Australia) Chris Atkinson	(Australia) Glenn MacNeall	Subaru Impreza WRC2006	4:07:48.3	20:39.5	2
8.	(Finland) Marcus Grönholm	(Finland) Timo Rautiainen	Ford Focus RS WRC 06	4:08:53.0	21:44.2	1
PCWRC
1.(9.)	(Japan) Toshi Arai	(New Zealand) Tony Sircombe	Subaru Impreza WRX STI	4:09:43.4	0.0	10
2.(10.)	(Qatar) Nasser Al-Attiyah	(United Kingdom) Chris Patterson	Subaru Impreza WRX STI	4:10:32.3	48.9	8
3.(11.)	(San Marino) Mirco Baldacci	(Italy) Giovanni Agnese	Mitsubishi Lancer Evolution IX	4:15:32.6	5:49.2	6
4.(13.)	(Poland) Leszek Kuzaj	(Poland) Maciej Szczepaniak	Subaru Impreza WRX STI	4:19:29.6	9:46.2	5
5.(15.)	(Russia) Sergey Uspenski	(Russia) Dmitri Yeremeyev	Subaru Impreza WRX STI	4:24:30.6	14:47.2	4
6.(17.)	(Argentina) Marcos Ligato	(Argentina) Rubén García	Mitsubishi Lancer Evolution IX	4:32:38.1	22:54.7	3
7.(18.)	(Czech Republic) Štěpán Vojtěch	(Czech Republic) Michal Ernst	Mitsubishi Lancer Evo VIII	4:35:30.2	25:46.8	2
8.(21.)	(Mexico) Francisco Name	(Mexico) Armando Zapata	Mitsubishi Lancer Evo VII	4:56:54.7	47:11.3	1

== Retirements ==
- (Spain) Xavier Pons - engine (SS8)
- (Japan) Fumio Nutahara - excluded (SS7)
- (Argentina) Sebastián Beltrán - accident (SS8)
- (Argentina) Gabriel Pozzo - differential (SS8)

== Special stages ==
All dates and times are CST (UTC-6).

Day	Stage	Time	Name	Length	Winner	Time	Avg. spd.	Rally leader
1 (3 MAR)	SS1	09:37	Ibarrilla 1	22.40 km	(Norway) P. Solberg	13:17.3	101.2 km/h	(Norway) P. Solberg
1 (3 MAR)	SS2	11:00	Guanajuato 1	28.87 km	(Norway) P. Solberg	16:56.4	102.3 km/h	(Norway) P. Solberg
1 (3 MAR)	SS3	11:51	El Cubilete 1	21.61 km	(Norway) P. Solberg	12:06.8	107.0 km/h	(Norway) P. Solberg
1 (3 MAR)	SS4	14:28	Ibarrilla 2	22.40 km	(Norway) P. Solberg	13:17.0	101.2 km/h	(Norway) P. Solberg
1 (3 MAR)	SS5	15:51	Guanajuato 2	28.87 km	(France) S. Loeb	16:33.9	104.6 km/h	(Norway) P. Solberg
1 (3 MAR)	SS6	16:42	El Cubilete 2	21.61 km	(France) S. Loeb	11:45.4	110.3 km/h	(Norway) P. Solberg
1 (3 MAR)	SS7	19:17	Nextel Superspecial 1	4.42 km	(Austria) M. Stohl	3:21.6	78.9 km/h	(Norway) P. Solberg
2 (4 MAR)	SS8	10:08	El Zauco 1	25.22 km	(France) S. Loeb	16:30.4	91.7 km/h	(France) S. Loeb
2 (4 MAR)	SS9	11:26	Duarte 1	23.75 km	(Norway) P. Solberg	18:07.4	78.6 km/h	(Norway) P. Solberg
2 (4 MAR)	SS10	12:17	Derramadero 1	23.27 km	(France) S. Loeb	14:03.6	99.3 km/h	(Norway) P. Solberg
2 (4 MAR)	SS11	15:10	El Zauco 2	25.22 km	(France) S. Loeb	16:21.4	92.6 km/h	(Norway) P. Solberg
2 (4 MAR)	SS12	16:28	Duarte 2	23.75 km	(France) S. Loeb	17:44.0	80.4 km/h	(France) S. Loeb
2 (4 MAR)	SS13	17:19	Derramadero 2	23.27 km	(France) S. Loeb	13:50.1	100.9 km/h	(France) S. Loeb
2 (4 MAR)	SS14	19:49	Nextel Superspecial 2	4.42 km	(France) S. Loeb	3:21.7	78.9 km/h	(France) S. Loeb
3 (5 MAR)	SS15	08:28	Leon	37.99 km	(France) S. Loeb	25:32.1	89.3 km/h	(France) S. Loeb
3 (5 MAR)	SS16	10:11	Silao	18.01 km	(Norway) P. Solberg	10:20.8	104.4 km/h	(France) S. Loeb
3 (5 MAR)	SS17	11:26	Nextel Superspecial 3	4.42 km	(Austria) M. Stohl	3:17.0	80.8 km/h	(France) S. Loeb

== Championship standings after the event ==
=== Drivers' championship ===
Pos	Driver	MON (Monaco)	SWE (Sweden)	MEX (Mexico)	ESP (Spain)	FRA (France)	ARG (Argentina)	ITA (Italy)	GRC (Greece)	GER (Germany)	FIN (Finland)	JPN (Japan)	CYP (Cyprus)	TUR (Turkey)	AUS (Australia)	NZL (New Zealand)	GBR (United Kingdom)	Pts
1	(France) Sébastien Loeb	2	2	1														26
2	(Finland) Marcus Grönholm	1	1	8														21
3	(Austria) Manfred Stohl	4	18	3														11
4	(Norway) Petter Solberg	Ret	Ret	2														8
5	(Finland) Toni Gardemeister	3																6
5	(Sweden) Daniel Carlsson		3															6
5	(Spain) Dani Sordo	8	16	4														6
8	(Italy) Gigi Galli	Ret	4															5
8	(Norway) Henning Solberg	Ret	8	5														5
8	(Australia) Chris Atkinson	6	11	7														5
11	(France) Stéphane Sarrazin	5																4
11	(Sweden) Thomas Rådström		5															4
13	(Finland) Kosti Katajamäki		6															3
13	(Republic of Ireland) Gareth MacHale	16		6														3
15	(Finland) Mikko Hirvonen	7	12	14														2
15	(Spain) Xavier Pons	9	7	Ret														2
Pos	Driver	MON (Monaco)	SWE (Sweden)	MEX (Mexico)	ESP (Spain)	FRA (France)	ARG (Argentina)	ITA (Italy)	GRC (Greece)	GER (Germany)	FIN (Finland)	JPN (Japan)	CYP (Cyprus)	TUR (Turkey)	AUS (Australia)	NZL (New Zealand)	GBR (United Kingdom)	Pts

Key
Colour	Result
Gold	Winner
Silver	2nd place
Bronze	3rd place
Green	Points finish
Blue	Non-points finish
Blue	Non-classified finish (NC)
Purple	Did not finish (Ret)
Black	Excluded (EX)
Black	Disqualified (DSQ)
White	Did not start (DNS)
White	Cancelled (C)
Blank	Withdrew entry from the event (WD)

=== Manufacturers' championship ===
Rank	Manufacturer	Event																Total points
Rank	Manufacturer	MON (Monaco)	SWE (Sweden)	MEX (Mexico)	ESP (Spain)	FRA (France)	ARG (Argentina)	ITA (Italy)	GRC (Greece)	GER (Germany)	FIN (Finland)	JPN (Japan)	CYP (Cyprus)	TUR (Turkey)	AUS (Australia)	NZL (New Zealand)	GBR (United Kingdom)	Total points
1	Kronos Total Citroën World Rally Team	11	13	10														34
2	BP Ford World Rally Team	14	12	4														30
3	OMV-Peugeot Norway	6	4	11														21
4	Subaru World Rally Team	5	3	12														20
5	Stobart VK M-Sport Ford Rally Team	0	7	2														9
6	Red Bull Škoda Team	3	0															3
