= 2006 Monte Carlo Rally =

World Rally Championship event

2006 Monte Carlo Rally 74th Rallye Automobile de Monte-Carlo
Round 1 of the 2006 World Rally Championship
Next event →
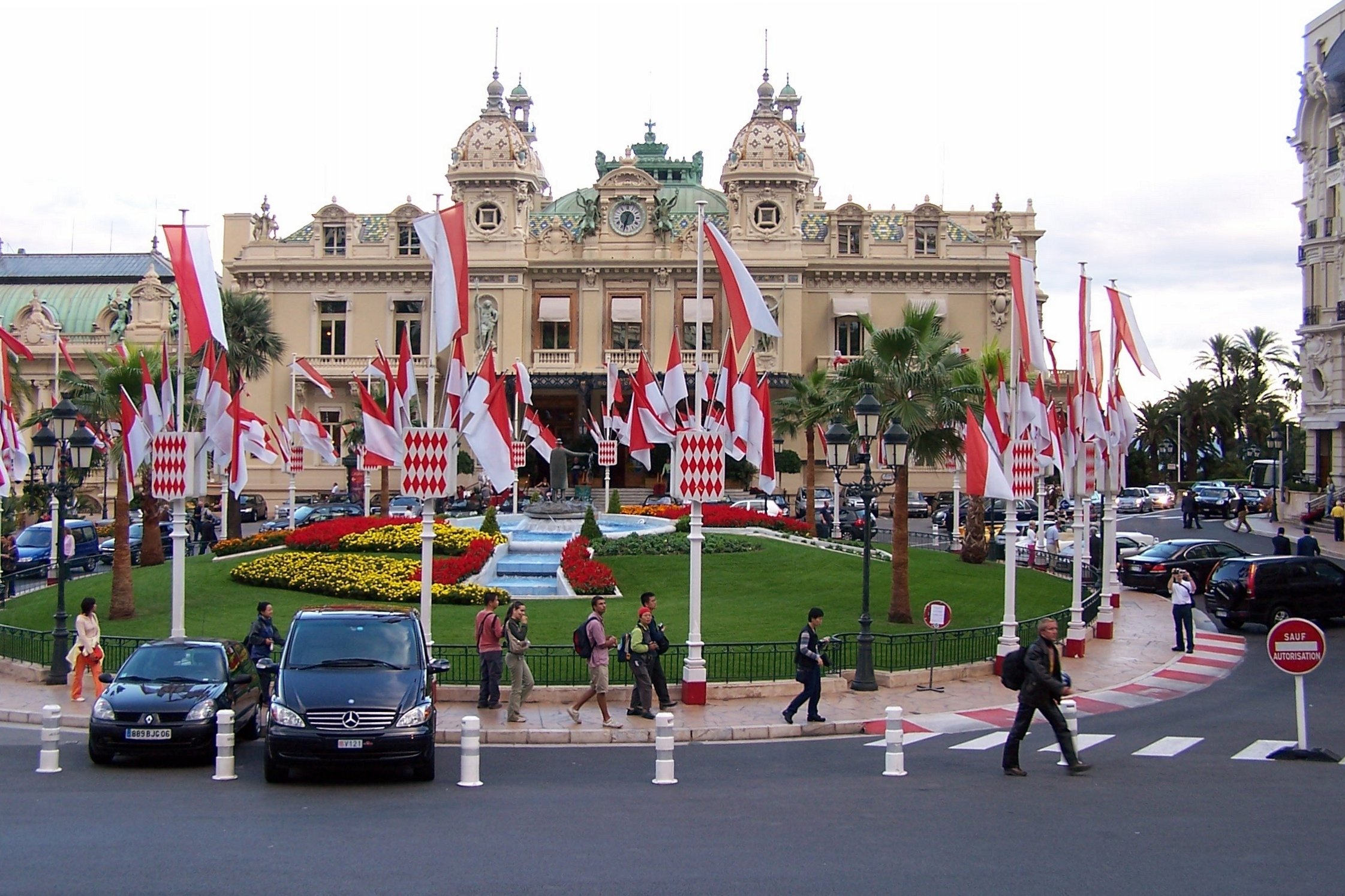
- View of the casino - the official start place of the Monte Carlo Rally
- Host country: Monaco
- Rally base: Monte Carlo
- Dates run: January 20, 2006 – January 22, 2006
- Stages: 18 (366.39 km; 227.66 miles)
- Stage surface: Tarmac / Ice / Snow
- Overall distance: 1,336.13 km (830.23 miles)

Statistics
- Crews: 51 at start, 43 at finish

Overall results
- Overall winner: (Finland) Marcus Grönholm (United Kingdom) BP Ford World Rally Team; Ford Focus RS WRC 06

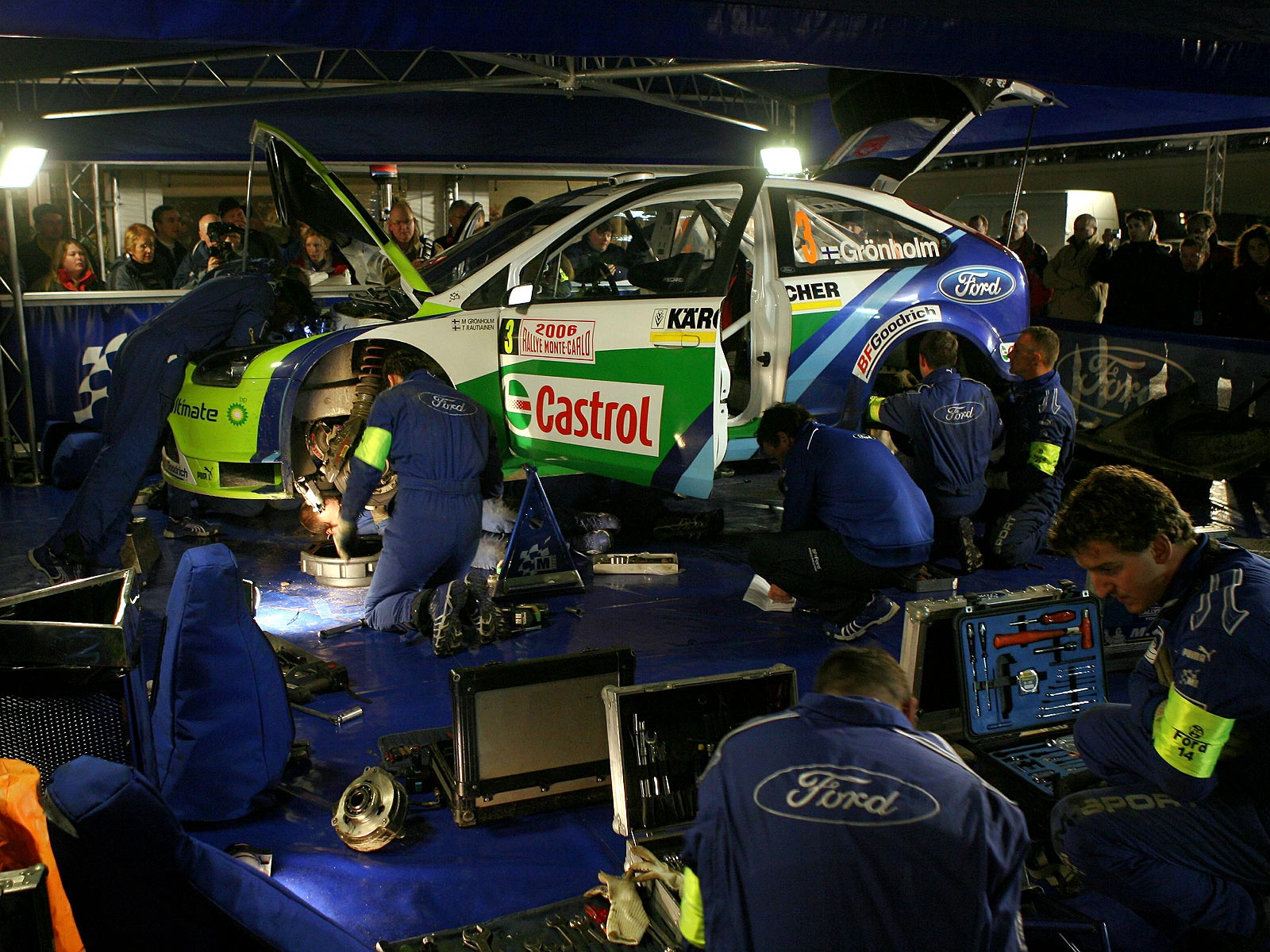
Marcus Grönholm's car in the service park.

The 2006 Monte Carlo Rally (formally the 74th Rallye Automobile de Monte-Carlo) was the first round of the 2006 World Rally Championship. The race was held over three days between 20 and 22 January 2006, and was won by Ford's Marcus Grönholm, his 19th win in the World Rally Championship.

== Report ==
The first event of the season saw many changes from the previous year. The new season saw just two full manufacturer teams compete (Ford and Subaru). Citroën supported a semi works effort through the Kronos team. Stobart increased their profile by creating a team using old Fords. OMV Peugeot Norway used the Peugeot 307 while Skoda maintained their presence through a team sponsored by Red Bull.

On the drivers front, Ford had a new lineup consisting of two time champion Marcus Grönholm and the promising young driver Mikko Hirvonen. Kronos used Citroëns twice world champion Sébastien Loeb alongside Xavier Pons. Subaru retained Petter Solberg with Stéphane Sarrazin and Chris Atkinson due to share the second seat depending on the surface. Stobart used a mixture of drivers alongside Matthew Wilson in his first full year. Manfred Stohl and Henning Solberg used the previously unloved Peugeot 307s. There were no places for Markko Märtin who fired an angry broadside before the Monte Carlo Rally at the direction the sport was taking. Toni Gardemeister lost his place at Ford along with Roman Kresta, both not doing enough to impress Malcolm Wilson during 2005. François Duval didn't find a seat after his erratic 2005 season, and there was still no place available for Colin McRae despite two promising performances for Skoda in 2005.

== Results ==
Pos.	Driver	Co-driver	Car	Time	Difference	Points
WRC
1.	(Finland) Marcus Grönholm	(Finland) Timo Rautiainen	Ford Focus RS WRC 06	4:11:43.9	0.0	10
2.	(France) Sébastien Loeb	(Monaco) Daniel Elena	Citroën Xsara WRC	4:12:45.7	1:01.8	8
3.	(Finland) Toni Gardemeister	(Finland) Jakke Honkanen	Peugeot 307 WRC	4:13:07.0	1:23.1	6
4.	(Austria) Manfred Stohl	(Austria) Ilka Minor	Peugeot 307 WRC	4:13:26.2	1:42.3	5
5.	(France) Stéphane Sarrazin	(Belgium) Stéphane Prévot	Subaru Impreza WRC 2006	4:15:04.1	3:20.2	4
6.	(Australia) Chris Atkinson	(Australia) Glenn MacNeall	Subaru Impreza WRC 05	4:16:46.3	5:02.4	3
7.	(Finland) Mikko Hirvonen	(Finland) Jarmo Lehtinen	Ford Focus RS WRC 06	4:18:03.4	6:19.5	2
8.	(Spain) Dani Sordo	(Spain) Marc Marti	Citroën Xsara WRC	4:18:59.1	7:15.2	1
PCWRC
1.(17.)	(Japan) Fumio Nutahara	(United Kingdom) Daniel Barritt	Mitsubishi Lancer Evolution IX	4:37:59.1	0.0	10
2.(21.)	(United Kingdom) David Higgins	(United Kingdom) Ross Butler	Mitsubishi Lancer Evo VII	4:44:30.9	6:31.8	8
3.(29.)	(Qatar) Nasser Al-Attiyah	(United Kingdom) Chris Patterson	Subaru Impreza	4:55:13.2	17:14.1	6
4.(39.)	(Italy) Stefano Marrini	(Italy) Tiziana Sandroni	Mitsubishi Lancer Evo VII	5:08:59.1	31:00.0	5
5.(41.)	(Finland) Jari-Matti Latvala	(Finland) Miikka Anttila	Subaru Impreza WRX STI	5:12:08.5	34:09.4	4

== Special stages ==
All dates and times are CET (UTC+1).

Day	Stage	Time	Name	Length	Winner	Time	Avg. spd.	Rally leader
1 (20 JAN)	SS1	08:33	St Sauveur Sur Tinee - Beuil 1	22.22 km	(France) S. Loeb	15:14.0	87.6 km/h	(France) S. Loeb
1 (20 JAN)	SS2	09:31	Guillaumes - Valberg 1	13.60 km	(Finland) M. Grönholm	9:37.2	84.8 km/h	(France) S. Loeb
1 (20 JAN)	SS3	10:19	Pierlas - Ilonse 1	23.22 km	Cancelled			(France) S. Loeb
1 (20 JAN)	SS4	14:25	St. Sauveur Sur Tinee - Beui 2	22.22 km	(France) S. Loeb	14:43.9	90.5 km/h	(France) S. Loeb
1 (20 JAN)	SS5	15:23	Guillaumes - Valberg 2	13.60 km	(Belgium) F. Duval	9:43.3	83.9 km/h	(France) S. Loeb
1 (20 JAN)	SS6	16:11	Pierlas - Ilonse 2	23.22 km	(Finland) M. Grönholm	18:47.6	74.1 km/h	(Finland) M. Grönholm
2 (21 JAN)	SS7	07:53	Sigale - Bif. D10/D110	22.54 km	(France) S. Loeb	16:50.4	80.3 km/h	(Finland) M. Grönholm
2 (21 JAN)	SS8	09:06	St. Antonin - Toudon 1	20.22 km	(France) S. Loeb	14:41.2	82.6 km/h	(Finland) M. Grönholm
2 (21 JAN)	SS9	10:19	La Tour Sur Tinee - Utelle 1	18.73 km	(France) S. Loeb	15:41.5	71.6 km/h	(Finland) M. Grönholm
2 (21 JAN)	SS10	14:30	St. Antonin - Toudon 2	20.22 km	(France) S. Loeb	14:21.2	84.5 km/h	(Finland) M. Grönholm
2 (21 JAN)	SS11	15:43	La Tour Sur Tinee - Utelle 2	18.73 km	Cancelled			(Finland) M. Grönholm
2 (21 JAN)	SS12	16:38	La Bollene Vesubie - Sospel 1	31.25 km	(France) S. Loeb	24:03.1	78.0 km/h	(Finland) M. Grönholm
3 (22JAN)	SS13	07:55	Col de Braus - La Cabanette 1	12.60 km	(France) S. Loeb	12:16.2	61.6 km/h	(Finland) M. Grönholm
3 (22JAN)	SS14	08:23	Col St. Roch - Lantosque 1	14.45 km	(Finland) T. Gardemeister	11:20.0	76.5 km/h	(Finland) M. Grönholm
3 (22JAN)	SS15	08:56	La Bollene Vesubie - Sospel 2	31.25 km	(France) S. Loeb	24:07.0	77.7 km/h	(Finland) M. Grönholm
3 (22JAN)	SS16	11:44	Col de Braus - La Cabanette 2	12.60 km	(France) S. Loeb	11:38.5	64.9 km/h	(Finland) M. Grönholm
3 (22JAN)	SS17	12:12	Col St. Roch - Lantosque 2	14.45 km	(Austria) M. Stohl	10:56.4	79.3 km/h	(Finland) M. Grönholm
3 (22JAN)	SS18	12:45	La Bollene Vesubie - Sospel 3	31.25 km	(Austria) M. Stohl	23:02.8	81.4 km/h	(Finland) M. Grönholm

== Championship standings after the event ==
=== Drivers' championship ===
Pos	Driver	MON (Monaco)	SWE (Sweden)	MEX (Mexico)	ESP (Spain)	FRA (France)	ARG (Argentina)	ITA (Italy)	GRC (Greece)	GER (Germany)	FIN (Finland)	JPN (Japan)	CYP (Cyprus)	TUR (Turkey)	AUS (Australia)	NZL (New Zealand)	GBR (United Kingdom)	Pts
1	(Finland) Marcus Grönholm	1																10
2	(France) Sébastien Loeb	2																8
3	(Finland) Toni Gardemeister	3																6
4	(Austria) Manfred Stohl	4																5
5	(France) Stéphane Sarrazin	5																4
6	(Australia) Chris Atkinson	6																3
7	(Finland) Mikko Hirvonen	7																2
8	(Spain) Dani Sordo	8																1
Pos	Driver	MON (Monaco)	SWE (Sweden)	MEX (Mexico)	ESP (Spain)	FRA (France)	ARG (Argentina)	ITA (Italy)	GRC (Greece)	GER (Germany)	FIN (Finland)	JPN (Japan)	CYP (Cyprus)	TUR (Turkey)	AUS (Australia)	NZL (New Zealand)	GBR (United Kingdom)	Pts

Key
Colour	Result
Gold	Winner
Silver	2nd place
Bronze	3rd place
Green	Points finish
Blue	Non-points finish
Blue	Non-classified finish (NC)
Purple	Did not finish (Ret)
Black	Excluded (EX)
Black	Disqualified (DSQ)
White	Did not start (DNS)
White	Cancelled (C)
Blank	Withdrew entry from the event (WD)

=== Manufacturers' championship ===
Rank	Manufacturer	Event																Total points
Rank	Manufacturer	MON (Monaco)	SWE (Sweden)	MEX (Mexico)	ESP (Spain)	FRA (France)	ARG (Argentina)	ITA (Italy)	GRC (Greece)	GER (Germany)	FIN (Finland)	JPN (Japan)	CYP (Cyprus)	TUR (Turkey)	AUS (Australia)	NZL (New Zealand)	GBR (United Kingdom)	Total points
1	BP Ford World Rally Team	14																14
2	Kronos Total Citroën World Rally Team	11																11
3	OMV-Peugeot Norway	6																6
4	Subaru World Rally Team	5																5
5	Red Bull Škoda Team	3																3
6	Stobart VK M-Sport Ford Rally Team	0																0
