= 2006 Swedish Rally =

Rallying motorsport event

2006 Swedish Rally 55th Uddeholm Swedish Rally
Round 2 of the 2006 World Rally Championship
← Previous event	Next event →
- Host country: Sweden
- Rally base: Karlstad
- Dates run: February 3 – 5 2006
- Stages: 19 (349.02 km; 216.87 miles)
- Stage surface: Ice/Snow-covered Gravel
- Overall distance: 1,441.16 km (895.50 miles)

Statistics
- Crews: 63 at start, 51 at finish

Overall results
- Overall winner: (Finland) Marcus Grönholm (United Kingdom) BP Ford World Rally Team

The 55th Uddeholm Swedish Rally, the second round of the 2006 World Rally Championship season took place from February 3–5, 2006.

== Results ==
Pos.	Driver	Co-driver	Car	Time	Difference	Points
WRC
1.	(Finland) Marcus Grönholm	(Finland) Timo Rautiainen	Ford Focus RS WRC 06	3:09:01.9	0.0	10
2.	(France) Sébastien Loeb	(Monaco) Daniel Elena	Citroën Xsara WRC	3:09:32.8	30.9	8
3.	(Sweden) Daniel Carlsson	(Sweden) Bosse Holmstrand	Mitsubishi Lancer WR05	3:11:58.7	2:56.8	6
4.	(Italy) Gigi Galli	(Italy) Giovanni Bernacchini	Mitsubishi Lancer WR05	3:12:05.7	3:03.8	5
5.	(Sweden) Thomas Rådström	(Sweden) Jörgen Skallman	Subaru S10 WRC	3:14:55.2	5:53.3	4
6.	(Finland) Kosti Katajamäki	(Finland) Timo Alanne	Ford Focus RS WRC 04	3:16:36.7	7:34.8	3
7.	(Spain) Xavier Pons	(Spain) Carlos del Barrio	Citroën Xsara WRC	3:17:37.5	8:35.6	2
8.	(Norway) Henning Solberg	(Norway) Cato Menkerud	Peugeot 307 WRC	3:18:03.4	9:01.5	1
JWRC
1.(19.)	(Sweden) Per-Gunnar Andersson	(Sweden) Jonas Andersson	Suzuki Swift S1600	3:29:18.7	0.0	10
2.(20.)	(Sweden) Patrik Sandell	(Sweden) Emil Axelsson	Renault Clio S1600	3:30:11.8	53.1	8
3.(22.)	(Estonia) Urmo Aava	(Estonia) Kuldar Sikk	Suzuki Swift S1600	3:32:13.8	2:55.1	6
4.(25.)	(Czech Republic) Pavel Valoušek	(Italy) Pierangelo Scalvini	Suzuki Swift S1600	3:36:01.0	6:42.3	5
5.(26.)	(Finland) Kalle Pinomäki	(Finland) Mikko Markkula	Renault Clio Ragnotti	3:37:24.5	8:05.8	4
6.(30.)	(Slovakia) Jozef Béreš	(Czech Republic) Petr Starý	Suzuki Ignis S1600	3:43:36.5	14:17.8	3
7.(34.)	(Sweden) Peter Zachrisson	(Sweden) Jan Svanström	Suzuki Ignis S1600	3:50:24.6	21:05.9	2
8.(37.)	(Poland) Michał Kościuszko	(Poland) Jarek Baran	Suzuki Ignis S1600	3:56:17.8	26:59.1	1

== Retirements ==
- (Norway) Petter Solberg - excluded (SS18)
- (Austria) Andreas Aigner - engine (SS16)
- (Sweden) Mattias Ekström - accident (SS14)

== Special stages ==
All dates and times are CET (UTC+1).

Day	Stage	Time	Name	Length	Winner	Time	Avg. spd.	Rally leader
1 (3 FEB)	SS1	08:01	Fredriksberg 1	18.13 km	(Finland) M. Grönholm	10:25.7	104.3 km/h	(Finland) M. Grönholm
1 (3 FEB)	SS2	09:01	Lejen 1	26.46 km	(Finland) M. Grönholm	14:20.9	110.6 km/h	(Finland) M. Grönholm
1 (3 FEB)	SS3	12:09	Fredriksberg 2	18.13 km	(Italy) G. Galli	10:29.1	103.7 km/h	(Finland) M. Grönholm
1 (3 FEB)	SS4	13:09	Lejen 2	26.46 km	(France) S. Loeb	14:24.4	110.2 km/h	(Finland) M. Grönholm
1 (3 FEB)	SS5	15:49	Vargasen 1	39.95 km	(France) S. Loeb	20:40.5	115.9 km/h	(Finland) M. Grönholm
1 (3 FEB)	SS6	17:07	Hagfors Sprint 1	1.87 km	(France) S. Loeb	1:54.7	58.7 km/h	(Finland) M. Grönholm
2 (4 FEB)	SS7	08:00	Hara 1	11.31 km	(Finland) M. Grönholm	6:04.8	111.6 km/h	(Finland) M. Grönholm
2 (4 FEB)	SS8	09:06	Sundsjon 1	20.78 km	(Finland) M. Grönholm	11:07.4	112.1 km/h	(Finland) M. Grönholm
2 (4 FEB)	SS9	11:37	Likenas	21.78 km	(Finland) M. Grönholm	12:19.6	106.0 km/h	(Finland) M. Grönholm
2 (4 FEB)	SS10	12:34	Hara 2	11.31 km	(Finland) M. Grönholm	6:02.4	112.4 km/h	(Finland) M. Grönholm
2 (4 FEB)	SS11	13:49	Sundsjon 2	20.78 km	(Finland) M. Grönholm	11:00.4	113.3 km/h	(Finland) M. Grönholm
2 (4 FEB)	SS12	15:39	Vargasen 2	39.95 km	(France) S. Loeb	20:43.8	115.6 km/h	(Finland) M. Grönholm
2 (4 FEB)	SS13	16:57	Hagfors Sprint 2	1.87 km	(France) S. Loeb	2:00.7	55.8 km/h	(Finland) M. Grönholm
3 (5 FEB)	SS14	07:58	Lesjofors 1	10.48 km	(France) S. Loeb	5:56.3	105.9 km/h	(Finland) M. Grönholm
3 (5 FEB)	SS15	08:30	Rammen 1	23.35 km	(France) S. Loeb	11:49.3	118.5 km/h	(Finland) M. Grönholm
3 (5 FEB)	SS16	09:21	Malta 1	11.25 km	(France) S. Loeb	5:47.7	116.5 km/h	(Finland) M. Grönholm
3 (5 FEB)	SS17	11:29	Lesjofors 2	10.48 km	(Finland) M. Grönholm	5:47.7	108.5 km/h	(Finland) M. Grönholm
3 (5 FEB)	SS18	12:01	Rammen 2	23.35 km	(Finland) M. Grönholm	11:50.3	118.3 km/h	(Finland) M. Grönholm
3 (5 FEB)	SS19	12:52	Malta 2	11.25 km	(Finland) M. Grönholm	5:48.0	116.4 km/h	(Finland) M. Grönholm

== Championship standings after the event ==
=== Drivers' championship ===
Pos	Driver	MON (Monaco)	SWE (Sweden)	MEX (Mexico)	ESP (Spain)	FRA (France)	ARG (Argentina)	ITA (Italy)	GRC (Greece)	GER (Germany)	FIN (Finland)	JPN (Japan)	CYP (Cyprus)	TUR (Turkey)	AUS (Australia)	NZL (New Zealand)	GBR (United Kingdom)	Pts
1	(Finland) Marcus Grönholm	1	1															20
2	(France) Sébastien Loeb	2	2															16
3	(Finland) Toni Gardemeister	3																6
3	(Sweden) Daniel Carlsson		3															6
5	(Austria) Manfred Stohl	4	18															5
5	(Italy) Gigi Galli	Ret	4															5
7	(France) Stéphane Sarrazin	5																4
7	(Sweden) Thomas Rådström		5															4
9	(Australia) Chris Atkinson	6	11															3
9	(Finland) Kosti Katajamäki		6															3
11	(Finland) Mikko Hirvonen	7	12															2
11	(Spain) Xavier Pons	9	7															2
13	(Spain) Dani Sordo	8	16															1
13	(Norway) Henning Solberg	Ret	8															1
Pos	Driver	MON (Monaco)	SWE (Sweden)	MEX (Mexico)	ESP (Spain)	FRA (France)	ARG (Argentina)	ITA (Italy)	GRC (Greece)	GER (Germany)	FIN (Finland)	JPN (Japan)	CYP (Cyprus)	TUR (Turkey)	AUS (Australia)	NZL (New Zealand)	GBR (United Kingdom)	Pts

Key
Colour	Result
Gold	Winner
Silver	2nd place
Bronze	3rd place
Green	Points finish
Blue	Non-points finish
Blue	Non-classified finish (NC)
Purple	Did not finish (Ret)
Black	Excluded (EX)
Black	Disqualified (DSQ)
White	Did not start (DNS)
White	Cancelled (C)
Blank	Withdrew entry from the event (WD)

=== Manufacturers' championship ===
Rank	Manufacturer	Event																Total points
Rank	Manufacturer	MON (Monaco)	SWE (Sweden)	MEX (Mexico)	ESP (Spain)	FRA (France)	ARG (Argentina)	ITA (Italy)	GRC (Greece)	GER (Germany)	FIN (Finland)	JPN (Japan)	CYP (Cyprus)	TUR (Turkey)	AUS (Australia)	NZL (New Zealand)	GBR (United Kingdom)	Total points
1	BP Ford World Rally Team	14	12															26
2	Kronos Total Citroën World Rally Team	11	13															24
3	OMV-Peugeot Norway	6	4															10
4	Subaru World Rally Team	5	3															8
5	Stobart VK M-Sport Ford Rally Team	0	7															7
6	Red Bull Škoda Team	3	0															3
