= 2010 Rallye Deutschland =

2010 Rally Deutschland: 28. ADAC Rallye Deutschland
Round 9 of the 2010 World Rally Championship
| ← Previous event | Next event → |
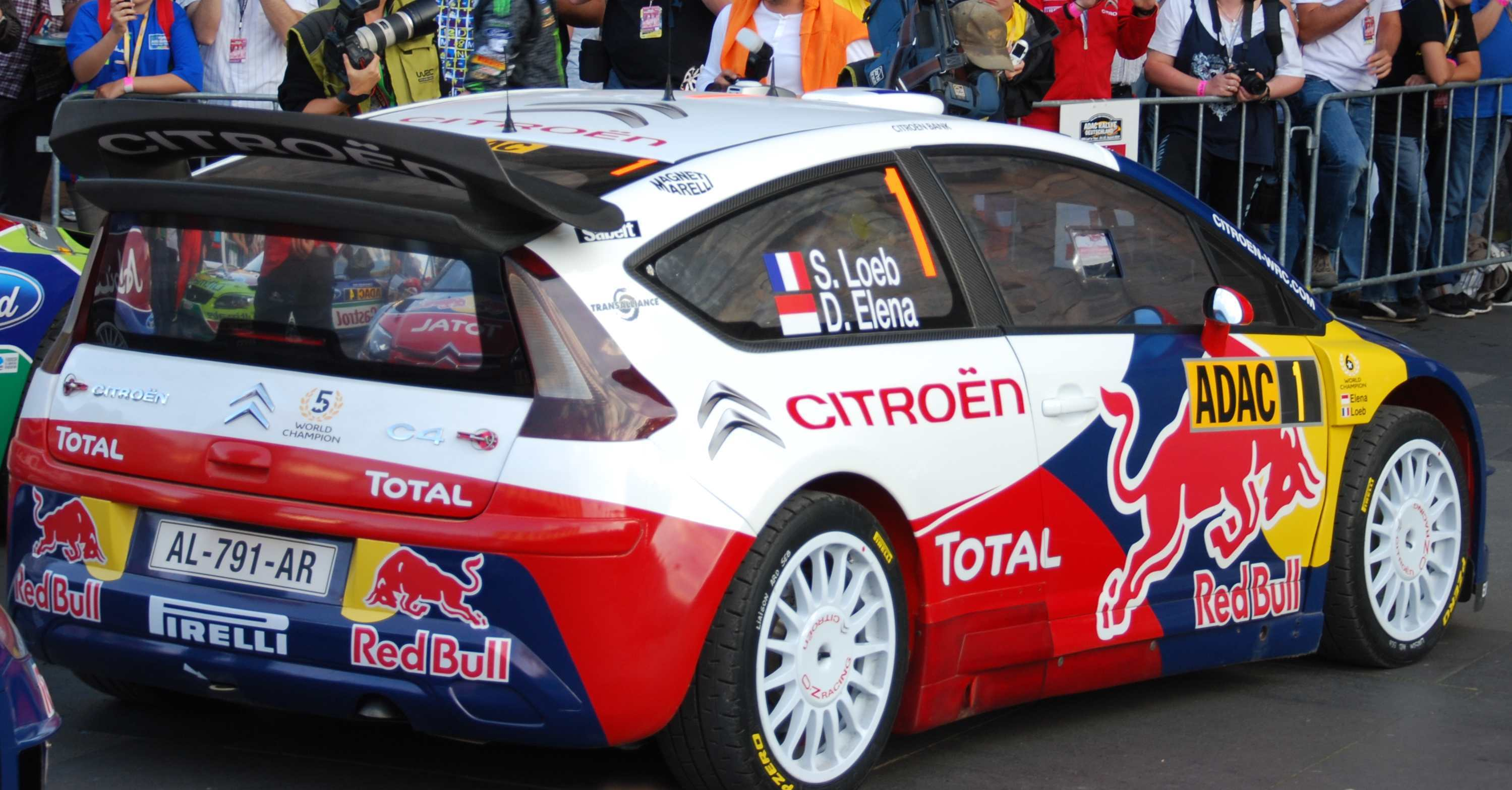
- Eventual winner Sébastien Loeb before the event
- Host country: Germany
- Rally base: Trier, Germany
- Dates run: 20 – 22 August 2010
- Stages: 19 (405.67 km; 252.07 miles)
- Stage surface: Tarmac
- Overall distance: 1,192.99 km (741.29 miles)

Statistics
- Crews: 77 at start, 55 at finish

Overall results
- Overall winner: (France) Sébastien Loeb (France) Citroën Total WRT

The 2010 ADAC Rallye Deutschland was the 28th Rallye Deutschland and the ninth round of the 2010 World Rally Championship season. The rally took place between 20 and 22 August in Trier. It was the first of two WRC rounds where all WRC support series competed in the same round. The rally was the fourth round of the Junior World Rally Championship, the sixth round of the Production World Rally Championship and the seventh round of the Super 2000 World Rally Championship.

Sébastien Loeb claimed his 59th WRC victory to move 58 points clear in the championship with a maximum of 100 points still available in the remaining four events. The rally also saw the only overall stage win for F1 driver Kimi Räikkönen.

== Results ==
=== Event standings ===
| Pos. | Driver | Co-driver | Car | Time | Difference | Points |
Overall
| 1. | (France) Sébastien Loeb | (Monaco) Daniel Elena | Citroën C4 WRC | 3:59:38.3 | 0.0 | 25 |
| 2. | (Spain) Dani Sordo | (Spain) Diego Vallejo | Citroën C4 WRC | 4:00:29.6 | 51.3 | 18 |
| 3. | (France) Sébastien Ogier | (France) Julien Ingrassia | Citroën C4 WRC | 4:01:51.6 | 2:13.3 | 15 |
| 4. | (Finland) Jari-Matti Latvala | (Finland) Miikka Anttila | Ford Focus RS WRC 09 | 4:02:12.2 | 2:33.9 | 12 |
| 5. | (Norway) Petter Solberg | (United Kingdom) Chris Patterson | Citroën C4 WRC | 4:06:26.0 | 6:47.7 | 10 |
| 6. | (United Kingdom) Matthew Wilson | (United Kingdom) Scott Martin | Ford Focus RS WRC 08 | 4:08:25.0 | 8:46.7 | 8 |
| 7. | (Finland) Kimi Räikkönen | (Finland) Kaj Lindström | Citroën C4 WRC | 4:08:28.8 | 8:50.5 | 6 |
| 8. | (United Arab Emirates) Khalid Al Qassimi | (United Kingdom) Michael Orr | Ford Focus RS WRC 08 | 4:17:14.8 | 17:36.5 | 4 |
| 9. | (Netherlands) Mark van Eldik | (Netherlands) Robin Buysmans | Subaru Impreza WRC 08 | 4:17:31.3 | 17:53.0 | 2 |
| 10. | (Sweden) Patrik Sandell | (Sweden) Emil Axelsson | Škoda Fabia S2000 | 4:17:37.1 | 17:58.8 | 1 |
JWRC
| 1. (22.) | (Netherlands) Hans Weijs, Jr. | (Netherlands) Bjorn Degandt | Citroën C2 S1600 | 4:30:13.4 | 0.0 | 25 |
| 2. (26.) | (Germany) Aaron Burkart | (Germany) André Kachel | Suzuki Swift S1600 | 4:35:32.6 | 5:19.2 | 18 |
| 3. (30.) | (Estonia) Karl Kruuda | (Estonia) Martin Järveoja | Suzuki Swift S1600 | 4:41:26.1 | 11:12.7 | 15 |
| 4. (38.) | (Germany) Christian Riedemann | (Germany) Josefine Corinn Beinke | Ford Fiesta R2 | 4:50:53.4 | 20:40.0 | 12 |
| 5. (40.) | (Spain) Egoi Eder Valdés López | (Spain) Albert Garduno | Renault Clio R3 | 4:58:57.0 | 28:43.6 | 10 |
| 6. (46.) | (Spain) Yeray Lemes | (Spain) Rogelio Peňate | Renault Clio S1600 | 5:05:13.3 | 34:59.9 | 8 |
| 7. (54.) | (Bulgaria) Todor Slavov | (Bulgaria) Dobromir Filipov | Renault Clio R3 | 5:27:34.0 | 57:20.6 | 6 |
SWRC
| 1. (10.) | (Sweden) Patrik Sandell | (Sweden) Emil Axelsson | Škoda Fabia S2000 | 4:17:37.1 | 0.0 | 25 |
| 2. (11.) | (Czech Republic) Martin Prokop | (Czech Republic) Jan Tománek | Ford Fiesta S2000 | 4:17:41.8 | 4.7 | 18 |
| 3. (13.) | (Sweden) Per-Gunnar Andersson | (Sweden) Anders Fredriksson | Škoda Fabia S2000 | 4:20:49.7 | 3:12.6 | 15 |
| 4. (14.) | (Norway) Eyvind Brynildsen | (Norway) Cato Menkerud | Škoda Fabia S2000 | 4:20:52.3 | 3:15.2 | 12 |
| 5. (15.) | (Spain) Xavier Pons | (Spain) Alex Haro | Ford Fiesta S2000 | 4:23:37.2 | 6:00.1 | 10 |
| 6. (28.) | (Poland) Michał Kościuszko | (Poland) Maciek Szczepaniak | Škoda Fabia S2000 | 4:40:48.8 | 23:11.7 | 8 |
| 7. (32.) | (Portugal) Bernardo Sousa | (Portugal) Nuno Rodrigues da Silva | Ford Fiesta S2000 | 4:42:06.1 | 24:29.0 | 6 |
| 8. (34.) | (Andorra) Albert Llovera | (Spain) Borja Rozada | Abarth Grande Punto S2000 | 4:47:17.9 | 29:40.8 | 4 |
PWRC
| 1. (18.) | (Portugal) Armindo Araújo | (Portugal) Miguel Ramalho | Mitsubishi Lancer Evo X | 4:26:08.4 | 0.0 | 25 |
| 2. (19.) | (New Zealand) Hayden Paddon | (New Zealand) John Kennard | Mitsubishi Lancer Evo X | 4:26:32.8 | 24.4 | 18 |
| 3. (20.) | (Sweden) Patrik Flodin | (Sweden) Göran Bergsten | Subaru Impreza WRX STI | 4:28:53.5 | 2:45.1 | 15 |
| 4. (23.) | (Germany) Hermann Gassner, Jr. | (Germany) Katharina Wüstenhagen | Mitsubishi Lancer Evo IX | 4:30:43.6 | 4:35.2 | 12 |
| 5. (31.) | (Estonia) Ott Tänak | (Estonia) Kuldar Sikk | Mitsubishi Lancer Evo X | 4:41:42.0 | 15:33.6 | 10 |
| 6. (36.) | (Japan) Toshi Arai | (United Kingdom) Daniel Barritt | Subaru Impreza WRX STI | 4:49:35.8 | 23:27.4 | 8 |
| 7. (43.) | (Lebanon) Nicholai Georgiou | (Lebanon) Joseph Matar | Mitsubishi Lancer Evo X | 4:59:09.6 | 33:01.2 | 6 |
| 8. (45.) | (Kenya) Peter Horsey | (United Kingdom) Calvin Cooledge | Mitsubishi Lancer Evo X | 5:01:10.6 | 35:02.2 | 4 |
| 9. (53.) | (Portugal) Nuno Barroso Pereira | (Portugal) Pedro Conde | Subaru Impreza WRX STI | 5:26:01.9 | 59:53.5 | 2 |

=== Special stages ===
All dates and times are CEST (UTC+2).

| Day | Stage | Time | Name | Length | Winner | Time | Avg. spd. | Rally leader |
|---|---|---|---|---|---|---|---|---|
| 1 (20 Aug) | SS1 | 09:43 | Ruwertal / Fell 1 | 24.01 km | (France) Sébastien Loeb | 13:54.2 | 103.62 km/h | (France) Sébastien Loeb |
| 1 (20 Aug) | SS2 | 10:46 | Grafschaft Veldenz 1 | 23.09 km | (France) Sébastien Loeb | 13:29.5 | 102.69 km/h | (France) Sébastien Loeb |
| 1 (20 Aug) | SS3 | 11:34 | Moselland 1 | 19.92 km | (France) Sébastien Loeb | 12:06.8 | 98.67 km/h | (France) Sébastien Loeb |
| 1 (20 Aug) | SS4 | 14:32 | Ruwertal / Fell 2 | 24.01 km | (Norway) Petter Solberg | 13:51.7 | 103.93 km/h | (France) Sébastien Loeb |
| 1 (20 Aug) | SS5 | 15:35 | Grafschaft Veldenz 2 | 23.09 km | (France) Sébastien Loeb | 13:26.5 | 103.07 km/h | (France) Sébastien Loeb |
| 1 (20 Aug) | SS6 | 16:23 | Moselland 2 | 19.92 km | (Spain) Dani Sordo | 12:01.3 | 99.42 km/h | (France) Sébastien Loeb |
| 2 (21 Aug) | SS7 | 07:48 | Hermeskeil / Gusenburg 1 | 11.34 km | (France) Sébastien Loeb | 6:11.5 | 109.89 km/h | (France) Sébastien Loeb |
| 2 (21 Aug) | SS8 | 08:31 | St. Wendeler Land 1 | 16.95 km | (Spain) Dani Sordo | 9:10.3 | 110.89 km/h | (France) Sébastien Loeb |
| 2 (21 Aug) | SS9 | 09:04 | Freisen / Westrich 1 | 16.68 km | (France) Sébastien Loeb | 9:55.7 | 100.80 km/h | (France) Sébastien Loeb |
| 2 (21 Aug) | SS10 | 10:30 | Arena Panzerplatte 1 | 48.00 km | (France) Sébastien Loeb | 27:55.8 | 103.11 km/h | (France) Sébastien Loeb |
| 2 (21 Aug) | SS11 | 14:43 | Hermeskeil / Gusenberg 2 | 11.34 km | (Norway) Petter Solberg | 6:11.3 | 109.95 km/h | (France) Sébastien Loeb |
| 2 (21 Aug) | SS12 | 15:26 | St. Wendeler Land 2 | 16.95 km | (Spain) Dani Sordo | 9:11.6 | 110.62 km/h | (France) Sébastien Loeb |
| 2 (21 Aug) | SS13 | 15:59 | Freisen / Westrich 2 | 16.68 km | (Spain) Dani Sordo | 9:59.2 | 100.21 km/h | (France) Sébastien Loeb |
| 2 (21 Aug) | SS14 | 17:25 | Arena Panzerplatte 2 | 48.00 km | (Norway) Petter Solberg | 27:39.2 | 104.15 km/h | (France) Sébastien Loeb |
| 3 (22 Aug) | SS15 | 07:28 | Dhrontal 1 | 22.58 km | (Norway) Petter Solberg | 14:44.2 | 91.93 km/h | (France) Sébastien Loeb |
| 3 (22 Aug) | SS16 | 08:03 | Moselwein 1 | 18.08 km | (France) Sébastien Loeb | 10:50.7 | 100.03 km/h | (France) Sébastien Loeb |
| 3 (22 Aug) | SS17 | 10:36 | Dhrontal 2 | 22.58 km | (Norway) Petter Solberg | 14:36.9 | 92.70 km/h | (France) Sébastien Loeb |
| 3 (22 Aug) | SS18 | 11:11 | Moselwein 2 | 18.08 km | (France) Sébastien Loeb | 10:44.0 | 101.07 km/h | (France) Sébastien Loeb |
| 3 (22 Aug) | SS19 | 13:03 | Circus Maximus Trier | 4.37 km | (Finland) Kimi Räikkönen | 3:13.9 | 81.13 km/h | (France) Sébastien Loeb |

=== Standings after the rally ===
Drivers' Championship standings

| Pos. | Driver | Points |
|---|---|---|
| 1 | (France) Sébastien Loeb | 191 |
| 2 | (France) Sebastien Ogier | 133 |
| 3 | (Finland) Jari-Matti Latvala | 117 |
| 4 | (Norway) Petter Solberg | 100 |
| 5 | (Spain) Dani Sordo | 95 |
| 6 | (Finland) Mikko Hirvonen | 86 |
| 7 | (United Kingdom) Matthew Wilson | 56 |
| 8 | (Argentina) Federico Villagra | 26 |
| 9 | (Norway) Henning Solberg | 25 |
| 10 | (Finland) Kimi Räikkönen | 21 |

Manufacturers' Championship standings

| Pos. | Manufacturer | Points |
|---|---|---|
| 1 | (France) Citroen WRT | 308 |
| 2 | (United Kingdom) BP Ford WRT | 222 |
| 3 | (France) Citroen Junior Team | 168 |
| 4 | (United Kingdom) Stobart Ford | 118 |
| 5 | (Argentina) Munchi's Ford | 40 |
