= Kronos Citroën World Rally Team =

(Belgium) Kronos Citroën
- Full name: Kronos Total Citroën World Rally Team
- Base: Namur, Belgium
- Team principal(s): Marc van Dalen
- Drivers: (France) Sebastien Loeb (United Kingdom) Colin McRae (Spain) Dani Sordo (Spain) Xavier Pons
- Co-drivers: (Monaco) Daniel Elena (United Kingdom) Nicky Grist (Spain) Marc Martí (Spain) Carlos del Barrio
- Chassis: Xsara WRC
- Tyres: BF BF Goodrich

World Rally Championship history
- Debut: 2006 Monte Carlo Rally
- Last event: 2006 Rally GB
- Manufacturers' Championships: 0
- Drivers' Championships: 1 (2006)
- Rally wins: 8

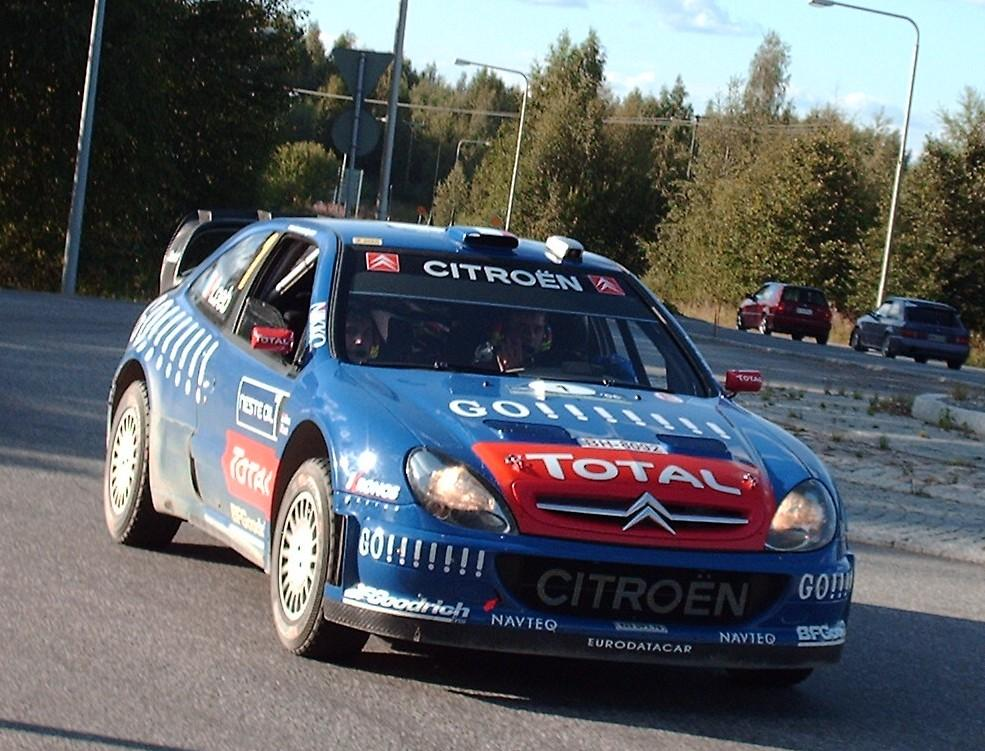
Loeb on a road section during the 2006 Rally Finland.

Kronos Total Citroën World Rally Team was a semi-private rally team that competed in the World Rally Championship in the 2006 season. The team was made up of some existing drivers of the 2005 Citroën official team, which took a sabbatical though supported the Belgian Kronos Racing team to enter in the manufacturer's name.

== Competition history ==
The Citroën factory team withdrew from the World Rally Championship for a year and selected Kronos to represent the brand in the 2006 season. The team took care of three Citroën Xsara WRCs, one of which was reserved for reigning world champion Sébastien Loeb. The other two were carried by Xavier Pons and Daniel Sordo. Colin McRae also replaced the injured Loeb in Turkey. Loeb and Citroën also led two championships after the Cyprus rally, but Loeb's withdrawal following the mountain bike accident and the inability of other Citroën drivers to oppose Ford drivers Marcus Grönholm and Mikko Hirvonen, allowed Ford's to steal the manufacturers' championship from them.

== WRC Results ==
Year	Driver	1	2	3	4	5	6	7	8	9	10	11	12	13	14	15	16	WDC	Points	WMC	Points
2006		MON	SWE	MEX	ESP	FRA	ARG	ITA	GRE	DEU	FIN	JPN	CYP	TUR	AUS	NZL	GBR			2nd	166
2006	(France) Sébastien Loeb	2	2	1	1	1	1	1	2	1	2	1	1					1st	112	2nd	166
2006	(United Kingdom) Colin McRae													Ret				-	0	2nd	166
2006	(Spain) Xavier Pons	9	7	Ret	Ret	6	17	4	8	14	Ret	DNS	7	4	4	4	5	7th	32	2nd	166
2006	(Spain) Daniel Sordo	8	16	4	2	3	5	3	6	2	Ret	DSQ	Ret	7	23	5	7	5th	49	2nd	166
