= Red Bull Škoda Team =

Austrian private rally team

Red Bull Škoda
- Full name: Red Bull Škoda Team
- Team principal(s): Raimund Baumschlager
- Drivers: (France) Gilles Panizzi (Sweden) Mattias Ekstrom (Finland) Harri Rovanpera (Austria) Andreas Aigner
- Chassis: Fabia WRC
- Tyres: BF BF Goodrich

World Rally Championship history
- Debut: 2006 Monte Carlo Rally
- Last event: 2006 Rally GB
- Manufacturers' Championships: 0
- Drivers' Championships: 0
- Rally wins: 0

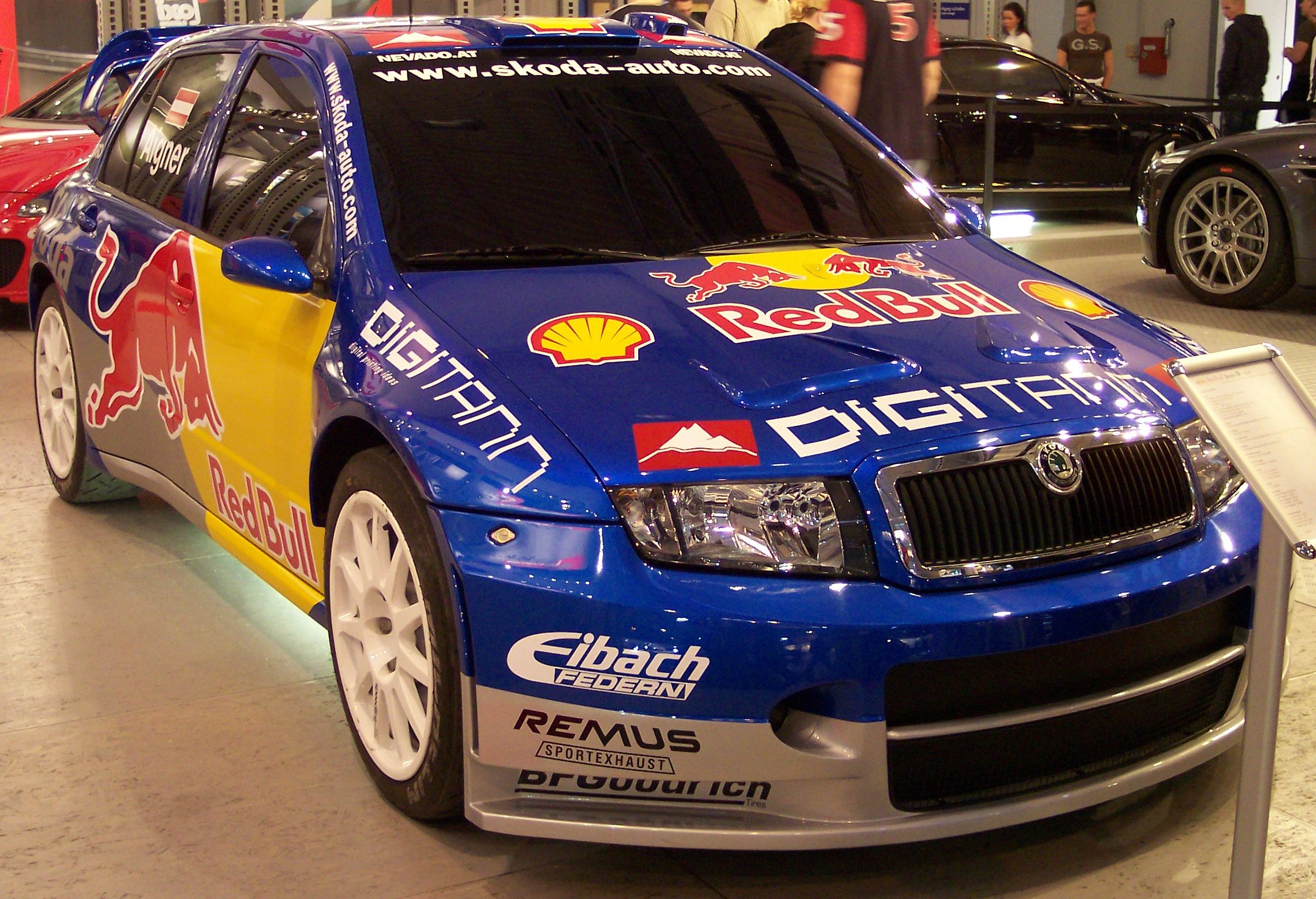

Red Bull Škoda Team is an Austrian private rally team that participated in the World Rally Championship in the 2006 season. It was managed by BRR - Baumschlager Rallye & Racing and sponsored by the Red Bull brand. The team participated with four different drivers, using the Škoda Fabia WRC as the vehicle, in ten rounds on the calendar. Andreas Aigner's best result was a sixth place at Rallye Deutschland.

== WRC Results ==
| Year | Car | No | Driver | 1 | 2 | 3 | 4 | 5 | 6 | 7 | 8 | 9 | 10 | 11 | 12 | 13 | 14 | 15 | 16 | WDC | Points | WMC | Points |
|---|---|---|---|---|---|---|---|---|---|---|---|---|---|---|---|---|---|---|---|---|---|---|---|
| 2006 | Fabia WRC | 11 | (France) Gilles Panizzi | MON; 10 | | MEX | ESP; 10 | | | | | | | | | | | | | – | 0 | 6th | 24 |
| 2006 | Fabia WRC | 11 | (Sweden) Mattias Ekström | | SWE; Ret | | | | | | | GER; 11 | | | | | | | | – | 0 | 6th | 24 |
| 2006 | Fabia WRC | 11 | (Finland) Harri Rovanperä | | | | | FRA; 12 | ARG | ITA; 20 | GRC; 12 | | FIN | JPN | CYP; Ret | TUR; 11 | AUS | NZL | GBR; 9 | – | 0 | 6th | 24 |
| 2006 | Fabia WRC | 12 | (Austria) Andreas Aigner | MON; 13 | SWE; Ret | MEX | ESP; 13 | FRA; 15 | ARG | ITA; 13 | GRC; 14 | GER; 6 | FIN | JPN | CYP; Ret | TUR; 10 | AUS | NZL | GBR; Ret | 23rd | 3 | 6th | 24 |
