= 2006 Rally Japan =

Rallying motorsport event

2006 Rally Japan 3rd Rally Japan
Round 11 of 16 in the 2006 World Rally Championship
← Previous event	Next event →
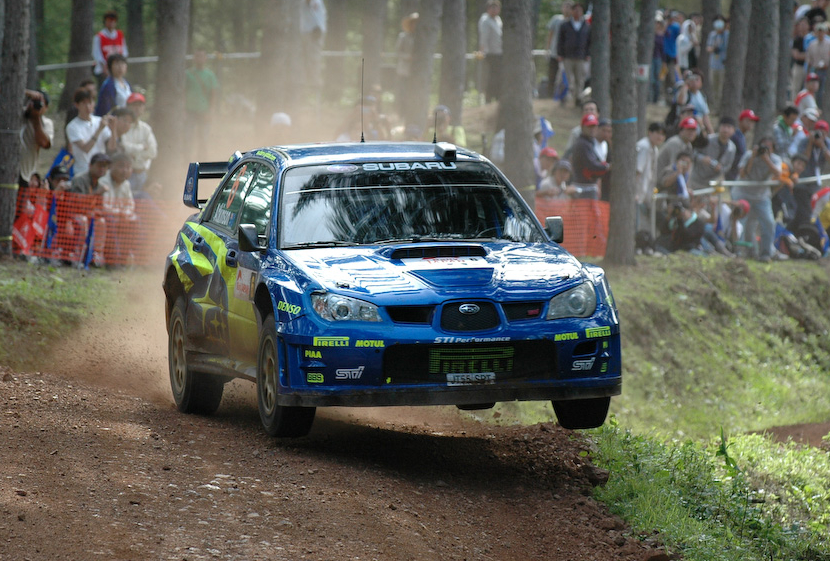
- Chris Atkinson
- Host country: Japan
- Rally base: Obihiro
- Dates run: 1 – 3 September 2006
- Stages: 27 (345.72 km; 214.82 miles)
- Stage surface: Gravel
- Transport distance: 1,240.8 km (771.0 miles)
- Overall distance: 1,586.52 km (985.82 miles)

Statistics
- Crews registered: 87
- Crews: 87 at start, 78 at finish

Overall results
- Overall winner: (France) Sébastien Loeb (Monaco) Daniel Elena (Belgium) Kronos Citroën World Rally Team; 3:22:20.4

The 2006 Rally Japan was a motor racing event for rally cars that was held over three days between 1 and 3 September 2006. It marked the 3rd running of the Rally Japan, and was the eleventh round of the 2006 World Rally Championship season. The event was also the fifth round of the 2006 Production World Rally Championship. The 2006 event was based in the town of Kita Aikoku near Obihiro in Japan and was contested over twenty seven special stages, covering a total competitive distance of 345.72km (214.82 miles).

Marcus Grönholm, along with BP Ford World Rally Team were the defending rally winners, trailing behind championship rival Sebastien Loeb by 31 points. Red Bull Škoda Team, as well as one of OMV Peugeot Norway's cars would miss the event.

Loeb and co-driver Daniel Elena won the rally, their first win since the 2006 Rallye Deutschland and their seventh of the season.

== Background ==
=== Entry list ===
The following crews were set to enter the rally. The event was open to crews competing in the World Rally Championship and its support category, the Production World Rally Championship, as well as privateer entries that were not registered to score points in the manufacturer's championship. Eleven were entered under World Rally Car regulations, as were eleven in the Production WRC category.

World Rally Car entries competing in the World Rally Championship
No.	Driver	Co-Driver	Entrant	Car	Tyre
1	(France) Sebastien Loeb	(Monaco) Daniel Elena	(Belgium) Kronos Citroën World Rally Team	Citroën Xsara WRC	BF
2	(Spain) Dani Sordo	(Spain) Marc Martí	(Belgium) Kronos Citroën World Rally Team	Citroën Xsara WRC	BF
3	(Finland) Marcus Gronholm	(Finland) Timo Rautiainen	(United Kingdom) BP Ford World Rally Team	Ford Focus RS WRC 06	BF
4	(Finland) Mikko Hirvonen	(Finland) Jarmo Lehtinen	(United Kingdom) BP Ford World Rally Team	Ford Focus RS WRC 06	BF
5	(Norway) Petter Solberg	(United Kingdom) Phil Mills	(Japan) Subaru World Rally Team	Impreza WRC 2006	P
6	(Australia) Chris Atkinson	(Australia) Glenn Macneall	(Japan) Subaru World Rally Team	Impreza WRC 2006	P
7	(Austria) Manfred Stohl	(Austria) Ilka Minor	OMV Peugeot Norway World Rally Team	Peugeot 307 WRC	BF
9	(United Kingdom) Matthew Wilson	(United Kingdom) Michael Orr	(United Kingdom) Stobart VK M-Sport Ford Rally Team	Ford Focus RS WRC 06	BF
10	(Argentina) Luis Perez Companc	(Argentina) Jose Maria Volta	(United Kingdom) Stobart VK M-Sport Ford Rally Team	Ford Focus RS WRC 06	BF

Group N entries competing in the Production WRC
No.	Driver	Co-Driver	Entrant	Car
32	(Argentina) Marcos Ligato	(Argentina) Rubén García	(Argentina) Tango Rally Team	Mitsubishi Lancer Evo IX
33	(Japan) Fumio Nutahara	(United Kingdom) Daniel Barritt	(Japan) Advan-Piaa Rally Team	Mitsubishi Lancer Evo IX
34	(Argentina) Sebastián Beltran	(Chile) Ricardo Rojas	(Argentina) Tango Rally Team	Mitsubishi Lancer Evo IX
35	(Argentina) Gabriel Pozzo	(Argentina) Daniel Stillo	(Argentina) Tango Rally Team	Mitsubishi Lancer Evo IX
36	(San Marino) Mirco Baldacci	(Italy) Giovanni Agnese	(France) Mitsubishi Paris West Team	Mitsubishi Lancer Evo IX
37	(Finland) Jari-Matti Latvala	(Finland) Miikka Anttila	(Italy) Motoring Club	Subaru Impreza WRX STI
38	(Poland) Leszek Kuzaj	(Poland) Maciej Szczepaniak	(Japan) Syms Rally Team	Subaru Impreza WRX STI
40	(Italy) Stefano Marrini	(Italy) Sandroni Tiziana	(Italy) Errani Team Group	Mitsubishi Lancer Evo IX
41	(Japan) Takuma Kamada	(France) Denis Giraudet	(Japan) Subaru Team Quasys	Subaru Impreza WRX STI
42	(San Marino) Loris Baldacci	(Italy) Dario D'Esposito	Subaru Rally Team Russia	Subaru Impreza WRX STI
45	(Finland) Aki Teiskonen	(Finland) Miika Teiskonen	(Japan) Syms Rally Team	Subaru Impreza WRX STI

Other major entries
No.	Driver	Co-Driver	Entrant	Car
12	(Republic of Ireland) Gareth MacHale	(Republic of Ireland) Paul Nagle	(Republic of Ireland) Tom Hogan Motors	Ford Focus RS WRC
14	(Japan) Toshihiro Arai	(New Zealand) Tony Sircombe	(Japan) Subaru World Rally Team	Subaru Impreza WRX STI

=== Itinerary ===
All dates and times are JST (UTC+9).

Date	No.	Time span	Stage name	Distance
31 August	—	After 8:30	Obihiro SSS [Shakedown]	1.30 km
1 September	SS1	After 8:03	Pawse Kamuy 1	9.05 km
1 September	SS2	After 8:51	Rikubetsu 1	2.73 km
1 September	SS3	After 9:27	Kanna 1	13.86 km
1 September	SS4	After 9:50	Puray 1	34.96 km
1 September		12:20	Service A, Obihiro	—N/a
1 September	SS5	After 14:23	Pawse Kamuy 2	9.05 km
1 September	SS6	After 15:11	Rikubetsu 2	2.73 km
1 September	SS7	After 15:47	Kanna 2	25.61 km
1 September	SS8	After 16:10	Puray 2	34.96 km
1 September	SS9	After 18:45	Obihiro 1	1.30 km
1 September	SS10	After 18:55	Obihiro 2	1.30 km
1 September		19:08	Service B, Obihiro	—N/a
2 September		6:00	Service C, Obihiro	—N/a
2 September	SS11	After 7:26	Emina	8.18 km
2 September	SS12	After 8:28	Rikubetsu 3	2.73 km
2 September	SS13	After 8:53	Niueo 1	20.75 km
2 September	SS14	After 9:25	Sipirkakim 1	22.43 km
2 September	SS15	After 10:35	Menan	16.25 km
2 September		12:20	Service D, Obihiro	—N/a
2 September	SS16	After 14:48	Rikubetsu 4	2.73 km
2 September	SS17	After 15:13	Niueo 2	20.75 km
2 September	SS18	After 15:45	Sipirkakim 2	22.43 km
2 September	SS19	After 16:55	Menan Short	9.17 km
2 September	SS20	After 18:45	Obihiro 3	1.30 km
2 September	SS21	After 18:55	Obihiro 4	1.30 km
2 September		19:08	Service E, Obihiro	—N/a
3 September		6:00	Service F, Obihiro	—N/a
3 September	SS22	After 7:19	Rera Kamuy	8.76 km
3 September	SS23	After 7:44	Panke Nikorpet 1	17.04 km
3 September	SS24	After 8:20	Penke 1	24.88 km
3 September		10:00	Service G, Obihiro	—N/a
3 September	SS25	After 11:43	Panke Nikorpet 2	17.04 km
3 September	SS26	After 12:19	Penke 2	24.88 km
3 September	SS27	After 14:09	Obihiro 5	1.30 km
3 September		14:22	Service H, Obihiro	—N/a

== Report ==
=== Overall ===
==== Summary ====
Opening the road on Friday, Loeb would begin the rally struggling in comparison to his championship rival Gronholm. Despite being fastest on the end-of-day super special stages, Loeb would trail his rival by just over ten seconds at the end of the day. Mikko Hirvonen would find himself in a comfortable third, as Atkinson struggled with mechanical issues throughout the day, being awarded a fifty second time penalty after leaving the service area later than scheduled.

Saturday morning would be much tighter between the leading pair; Gronholm would begin the morning with two stage wins, extending his lead, only for Loeb to fight back in the next stage, undoing all of his progress. Stage 14 would be where Gronholm lost the lead after a spin cost him nearly twenty seconds. The two would spend the rest of the day trading stage wins, and by the end of the second leg, Loeb would maintain a lead of over twenty seven seconds. Solberg would see various mechanical issues affect his Subaru, but in the afternoon he would close the gap back down to Sordo in front. Arai went off the road in stage 16, striking a photographer who suffered a leg injury from the accident. Arai would continue the rally with the blessing of the photographer, finishing the day in eighth.

On Sunday, Gronholm did all that he could to catch Loeb, winning four of the day's six stages, and closing the gap down to fifteen seconds by the mid day break. In the end, however, he simply would not have enough distance left to catch Loeb, who would cross the line victorious, leading by a much narrower 5.6 second lead. In winning the rally, Loeb beat the record for the most rallies won by a single driver in the World Rally Championship, previously held by Carlos Sainz. Companc would end the rally on the penultimate stage after crashing, while Sordo lost time negotiating the accident site, but was later excluded for not wearing seatbelts. MacHale would also end the rally early after striking a bridge in Stage 25.

==== Classification ====
Position		No.	Driver	Co-driver	Entrant	Car	Time	Difference	Points
Event	Class	No.	Driver	Co-driver	Entrant	Car	Time	Difference	Points
1	1	1	(France) Sebastien Loeb	(Monaco) Daniel Elena	Kronos Racing	Citroën Xsara WRC	3:22:20.4	0.0	10
2	2	3	(Finland) Marcus Grönholm	(Finland) Timo Rautiainen	BP Ford World Rally Team	Ford Focus RS WRC 06	3:22:26.4	+5.6	8
3	3	4	(Finland) Mikko Hirvonen	(Finland) Jarmo Lehtinen	BP Ford World Rally Team	Ford Focus RS WRC 06	3:25:06.9	+2:46.5	6
4	4	6	(Australia) Chris Atkinson	(Australia) Glenn MacNeall	Subaru World Rally Team	Subaru Impreza WRC	3:28:28.2	+6:07.8	5
5	5	7	(Austria) Manfred Stohl	(Austria) Ilka Minor	OMV Peugeot Norway World Rally Team	Peugeot 307 WRC	3:29:31.1	+7:10.7	4
6	6	14	(Japan) Toshihiro Arai	(New Zealand) Tony Sircombe	Subaru World Rally Team	Subaru Impreza WRX STI	3:31:25.5	+9:05.1	3
7	7	5	(Norway) Petter Solberg	(United Kingdom) Phil Mills	Subaru World Rally Team	Subaru Impreza WRC	3:34:04.1	+11:43.7	2
8	1	33	(Japan) Fumio Nutahara	(United Kingdom) Daniel Barritt	Advan-Piaa Rally Team	Mitsubishi Lancer Evo IX	4:56:11.9	+15:21.5	1
11	8	10	(Argentina) Luis Perez Companc	(Argentina) Jose Maria Volta	Stobart VK M-Sport Ford Rally Team	Ford Focus RS WRC 06	4:58:05.4	+17:15.0	0
40	9	9	(United Kingdom) Matthew Wilson	(United Kingdom) Michael Orr	Stobart VK M-Sport Ford Rally Team	Ford Focus RS WRC 06	5:06:11.4	+25:21.0	0
Retired SS27		2	(Spain) Dani Sordo	(Spain) Marc Marti	Kronos Citroën World Rally Team	Citroën Xsara WRC	Excluded		0
Retired SS27		12	(Republic of Ireland) Gareth MacHale	(Republic of Ireland) Paul Nagle	Tom Hogan Motors	Ford Focus RS WRC	Mechanical		0

==== Special Stages ====
All dates and times are JST (UTC+9).

Day	Stage	Time	Name	Length (km)	Winner	Time	Rally leader
1 (1 Sep)	SS1	08:03	Pawse Kamuy 1	9.50	(Finland) Marcus Grönholm	4:38.2	(Finland) Marcus Grönholm
1 (1 Sep)	SS2	08:51	Rikubetsu 1	2.73	(Finland) Marcus Grönholm	2:12.1	(Finland) Marcus Grönholm
1 (1 Sep)	SS3	09:27	Kanna 1	13.85	(France) Sébastien Loeb	8:06.3	(Finland) Marcus Grönholm
1 (1 Sep)	SS4	09:50	Puray 1	34.95	(Finland) Marcus Grönholm	19:45.3	(Finland) Marcus Grönholm
1 (1 Sep)	SS5	14:23	Pawse Kamuy 2	36.38	(Finland) Marcus Grönholm	4:32.9	(Finland) Marcus Grönholm
1 (1 Sep)	SS6	15:11	Rikubetsu 2	2.73	(Finland) Marcus Grönholm	2:07.9	(Finland) Marcus Grönholm
1 (1 Sep)	SS7	15:47	Kanna 2	13.85	(France) Sébastien Loeb	7:52.2	(Finland) Marcus Grönholm
1 (1 Sep)	SS8	16:10	Puray 2	34.95	(Finland) Marcus Grönholm	19:06.7	(Finland) Marcus Grönholm
1 (1 Sep)	SS9	18:45	Obihiro 1	1.29	(France) Sébastien Loeb	1:14.2	(Finland) Marcus Grönholm
1 (1 Sep)	SS10	18:55	Obihiro 2	1.29	(France) Sébastien Loeb	1:15.0	(Finland) Marcus Grönholm
2 (2 Sep)	SS11	07:26	Emina	8.18	(Finland) Marcus Grönholm	5:42.1	(Finland) Marcus Grönholm
2 (2 Sep)	SS12	08:28	Rikubetsu 3	2.73	(Finland) Marcus Grönholm	2:07.4	(Finland) Marcus Grönholm
2 (2 Sep)	SS13	08:53	Niueo 1	20.75	(France) Sébastien Loeb	12:10.6	(Finland) Marcus Grönholm
2 (2 Sep)	SS14	09:25	Sipirkakim 1	22.43	(France) Sébastien Loeb	12:17.0	(France) Sébastien Loeb
2 (2 Sep)	SS15	10:35	Menan	16.25	(France) Sébastien Loeb	10:17.3	(France) Sébastien Loeb
2 (2 Sep)	SS16	14:48	Rikubetsu 4	2.73	(Finland) Marcus Grönholm	2:04.2	(France) Sébastien Loeb
2 (2 Sep)	SS17	15:13	Niueo 2	20.75	(France) Sébastien Loeb	11:35.9	(France) Sébastien Loeb
2 (2 Sep)	SS18	15:45	Sipirkakim 2	22.43	(Finland) Marcus Grönholm	12:09.0	(France) Sébastien Loeb
2 (2 Sep)	SS19	16:55	Menan Short	9.17	(Finland) Marcus Grönholm	5:33.5	(France) Sébastien Loeb
2 (2 Sep)	SS20	18:45	Obihiro 3	1.29	(France) Sébastien Loeb	1:13.1	(France) Sébastien Loeb
2 (2 Sep)	SS21	18:55	Obihiro 4	1.29	(France) Sébastien Loeb	1:12.6	(France) Sébastien Loeb
3 (3 Sep)	SS22	07:19	Rera Kamuy	8.76	(Finland) Marcus Grönholm	5:07.2	(France) Sébastien Loeb
3 (3 Sep)	SS23	07:44	Panke Nikorpet 1	17.40	(France) Sébastien Loeb	9:36.8	(France) Sébastien Loeb
3 (3 Sep)	SS24	08:20	Penke 1	24.87	(Finland) Marcus Grönholm	14:44.3	(France) Sébastien Loeb
3 (3 Sep)	SS25	11:43	Panke Nikorpet 2	17.40	(Finland) Marcus Grönholm	9:13.4	(France) Sébastien Loeb
3 (3 Sep)	SS26	12:19	Penke 2	24.87	(Finland) Marcus Grönholm	14:21.5	(France) Sébastien Loeb
3 (3 Sep)	SS27	14:09	Obihiro 5	1.29	(Finland) Mikko Hirvonen	1:11.0	(France) Sébastien Loeb

==== Championship Standings ====
Pos.	Drivers' Championship			Manufacturers' Championship		
Pos.	Move	Driver	Points	Move	Manufacturer	Points
1		(France) Sébastien Loeb	102		(Belgium) Kronos Citroën World Rally Team	132
2		(Finland) Marcus Gronholm	69		(United Kingdom) BP Ford World Rally Team	121
3		(Spain) Dani Sordo	41		(Japan) Subaru World Rally Team	74
4		(Finland) Mikko Hirvonen	33		OMV Peugeot Norway World Rally Team	50
5		(Austria) Manfred Stohl	28		(United Kingdom) Stobart VK M-Sport Ford Rally Team	29

=== Production WRC ===
==== Classification ====
Position		No.	Driver	Co-driver	Entrant	Car	Time	Difference	Points
Event	Class	No.	Driver	Co-driver	Entrant	Car	Time	Difference	Points
8	1	33	(Japan) Fumio Nutahara	(United Kingdom) Daniel Barritt	Advan-Piaa Rally Team	Mitsubishi Lancer Evo IX	3:45:17.8	0.0	10
9	2	35	(Argentina) Gabriel Pozzo	(Argentina) Daniel Stillo	Tango Rally Team	Mitsubishi Lancer Evo IX	3:45:45.2	+27.4	8
10	3	32	(Argentina) Marcos Ligato	(Argentina) Rubén García	Tango Rally Team	Mitsubishi Lancer Evo IX	3:46:19.0	+1:01.2	6
13	4	45	(Finland) Aki Teiskonen	(Finland) Miika Teiskonen	Syms Rally Team	Subaru Impreza WRX STI	3:49:20.4	+4:02.6	5
17	5	38	(Poland) Leszek Kuzaj	(Poland) Maciej Szczepaniak	Syms Rally Team	Subaru Impreza WRX STI	3:56:37.7	+11:19.9	4
42	6	40	(Italy) Stefano Marrini	(Italy) Sandroni Tiziana	Errani Team Group	Mitsubishi Lancer Evo IX	4:19:56.1	+34:38.3	3
46	7	36	(San Marino) Mirco Baldacci	(Italy) Giovanni Agnese	Mitsubishi Paris West Team	Mitsubishi Lancer Evo IX	4:24:14.7	+38:56.9	2
54	8	41	(Japan) Takuma Kamada	(France) Denis Giraudet	Subaru Team Quasys	Subaru Impreza WRX STI	4:31:12.6	+45:54.8	1
69	9	37	(Finland) Jari-Matti Latvala	(Finland) Miikka Anttila	Motoring Club	Subaru Impreza WRX STI	5:04:49.4	+1:19:31.6	0
75	10	34	(Argentina) Sebastián Beltran	(Chile) Ricardo Rojas	Tango Rally Team	Mitsubishi Lancer Evo IX	5:30:01.7	+1:44:43.9	0
Retired SS11		42	(San Marino) Loris Baldacci	(Italy) Dario D'Esposito	Subaru Rally Team Russia	Subaru Impreza WRX STI	Accident		0

==== Championship Standings ====
Pos.	Drivers' Championship		
Pos.	Move	Driver	Points
1		(Qatar) Nasser Al-Attiyah	34
2	3	(Japan) Fumio Nutahara	20
3	1	(San Marino) Mirco Baldacci	19
4		(Poland) Leszek Kuzaj	17
5	2	(Japan) Toshihiro Arai	15

Previous event: 2006 Rally Finland	FIA World Rally Championship, 2006 season	Next event: 2006 Cyprus Rally
Previous year: 2005 Rally Japan	Rally Japan	Next year: 2007 Rally Japan
