= 2006 Cyprus Rally =

Rallying motorsport event

2006 Cyprus Rally 34th Cyprus Rally
Round 12 of 16 in the 2006 World Rally Championship
← Previous event	Next event →
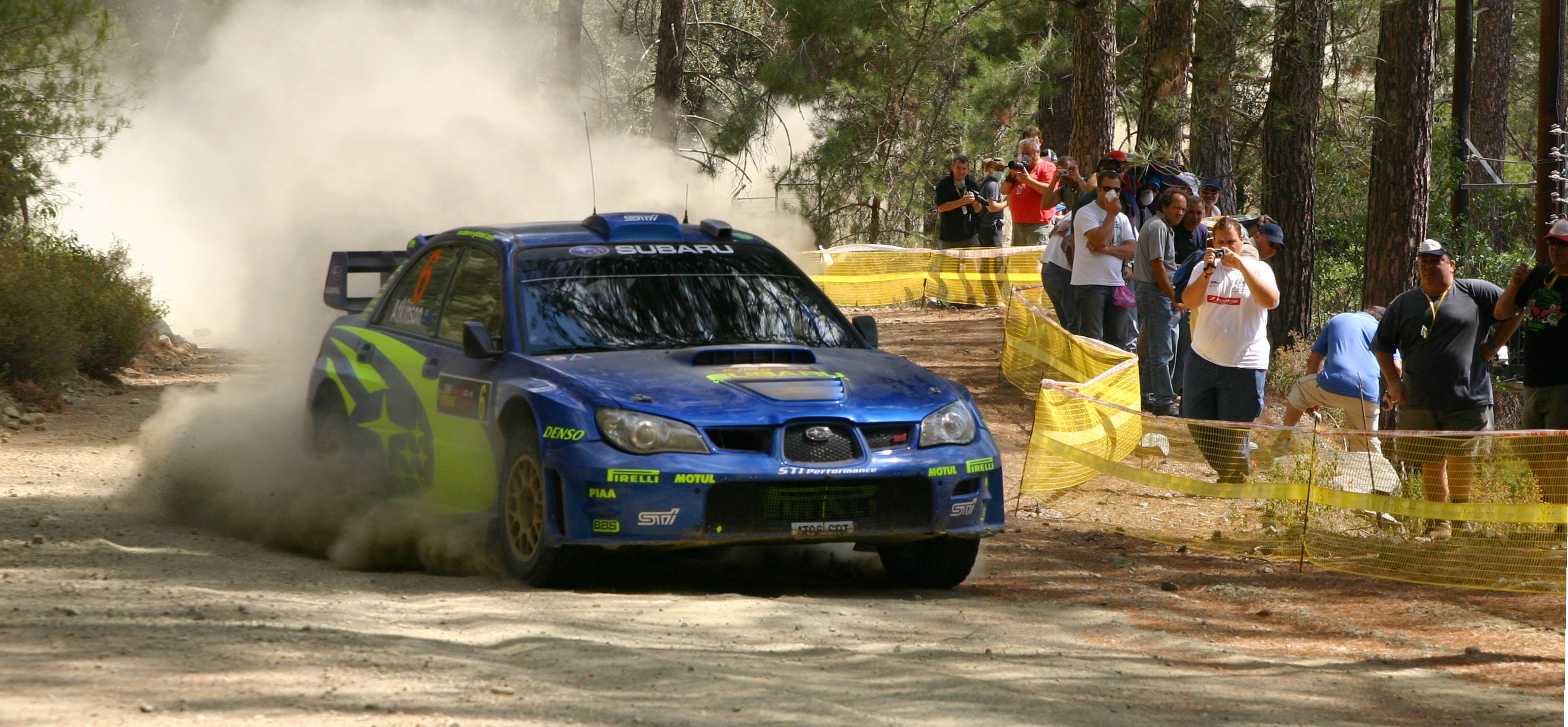
- Chris Atkinson on SS4
- Host country: Cyprus
- Rally base: Lemesos
- Dates run: 22 – 24 September 2006
- Stages: 21 (322.51 km; 200.40 miles)
- Stage surface: Gravel
- Transport distance: 830.02 km (515.75 miles)
- Overall distance: 1,152.53 km (716.15 miles)

Statistics
- Crews registered: 40
- Crews: 40 at start, 27 at finish

Overall results
- Overall winner: (France) Sébastien Loeb (Monaco) Daniel Elena (Belgium) Kronos Citroën World Rally Team; 4:40:50.4

The 2006 Cyprus Rally was a motor racing event for rally cars that was held over three days between 22 and 24 September 2006. It marked the 34th running of the Cyprus Rally, and was the twelfth round of the 2006 World Rally Championship season. The event was also the sixth round of the 2006 Production World Rally Championship. The 2006 event was based in Lemesos in Cyprus and was contested over twenty one special stages, covering a total competitive distance of 337.79km (209.89 miles).

Sebastien Loeb, along with Kronos Citroën World Rally Team were the defending rally winners, leading championship rival Marcus Grönholm by 33 points. Unbeknownst to Loeb, this would be his last rally of the season before breaking his arm in a mountain biking incident. Despite this, Loeb would go on to win the championship by 1 point after his lead became unassailable in the 2006 Rally Australia.

Loeb and co-driver Daniel Elena won the rally, their second consecutive win and eighth win of the season.

== Background ==
=== Entry list ===
The following crews were set to enter the rally. The event was open to crews competing in the World Rally Championship and its support category, the Production World Rally Championship, as well as privateer entries that were not registered to score points in the manufacturer's championship. Fifteen were entered under World Rally Car regulations, as were ten in the Production WRC category.

World Rally Car entries competing in the World Rally Championship
No.	Driver	Co-Driver	Entrant	Car	Tyre
1	(France) Sebastien Loeb	(Monaco) Daniel Elena	(Belgium) Kronos Citroën World Rally Team	Citroën Xsara WRC	BF
2	(Spain) Dani Sordo	(Spain) Marc Martí	(Belgium) Kronos Citroën World Rally Team	Citroën Xsara WRC	BF
3	(Finland) Marcus Gronholm	(Finland) Timo Rautiainen	(United Kingdom) BP Ford World Rally Team	Ford Focus RS WRC 06	BF
4	(Finland) Mikko Hirvonen	(Finland) Jarmo Lehtinen	(United Kingdom) BP Ford World Rally Team	Ford Focus RS WRC 06	BF
5	(Norway) Petter Solberg	(United Kingdom) Phil Mills	(Japan) Subaru World Rally Team	Impreza WRC 2006	P
6	(Australia) Chris Atkinson	(Australia) Glenn Macneall	(Japan) Subaru World Rally Team	Impreza WRC 2006	P
7	(Austria) Manfred Stohl	(Austria) Ilka Minor	OMV Peugeot Norway World Rally Team	Peugeot 307 WRC	BF
8	(Norway) Henning Solberg	(Norway) Cato Menkerud	OMV Peugeot Norway World Rally Team	Peugeot 307 WRC	BF
9	(United Kingdom) Matthew Wilson	(United Kingdom) Michael Orr	(United Kingdom) Stobart VK M-Sport Ford Rally Team	Ford Focus RS WRC 04	BF
10	(Argentina) Luis Perez Companc	(Argentina) Jose Maria Volta	(United Kingdom) Stobart VK M-Sport Ford Rally Team	Ford Focus RS WRC 04	BF
11	(Finland) Harri Rovanperä	(Finland) Risto Pietiläinen	(Austria) Red Bull Škoda Team	Škoda Fabia WRC	BF
12	(Austria) Andreas Aigner	(Germany) Klaus Wicha	(Austria) Red Bull Škoda Team	Škoda Fabia WRC	BF

Group N entries competing in the Production WRC
No.	Driver	Co-Driver	Entrant	Car
31	(Japan) Toshihiro Arai	(New Zealand) Tony Sircombe	(Japan) Subaru Team Arai	Subaru Impreza WRX STI
33	(Japan) Fumio Nutahara	(United Kingdom) Daniel Barritt	(Japan) Advan-Piaa Rally Team	Mitsubishi Lancer Evo IX
39	(Qatar) Nasser Al-Attiyah	(United Kingdom) Chris Patterson	(Qatar) QMMF	Subaru Impreza WRX STI
40	(Italy) Simone Campedelli	(Italy) Danilo Fappani	(Italy) Errani Team Group	Mitsubishi Lancer Evo VIII
41	(United Arab Emirates) Khalid Al-Qassimi	(United Kingdom) Nicky Beech	(Japan) Subaru Team Quasys	Subaru Impreza WRX STI
43	(Germany) Aaron Burkart	(Germany) Tanja Geilhausen	(Austria) OMV CEE World Rally Team	Mitsubishi Lancer Evo VIII
45	(Finland) Aki Teiskonen	(Finland) Miikka Anttila	(Japan) Syms Rally Team	Subaru Impreza WRX STI
46	(United Kingdom) Nigel Heath	(United Kingdom) Steve Lancaster	(United Kingdom) PSM Motorsport	Subaru Impreza WRX STI
59	(Cyprus) Andreas Tsouloftas	(Cyprus) Savvas Laos	(Cyprus) Andreas Tsouloftas	Mitsubishi Lancer Evo IX
60	(Cyprus) Spyros Pavlides	(Cyprus) Theodoros Vassiliades	(Cyprus) Spyros Pavlides	Subaru Impreza WRX STI

Other major entries
No.	Driver	Co-Driver	Entrant	Car
14	(Finland) Toni Gardemeister	(Finland) Jakke Honkanen	(Italy) Astra Racing	Citroën Xsara WRC
15	(Spain) Xavier Pons	(Spain) Carlos del Barrio	(Belgium) Kronos Racing	Citroën Xsara WRC
17	(Argentina) Juan Pablo Raies	(Argentina) Jorge Perez Companc	(United Kingdom) Stobart VK M-Sport Ford Rally Team	Ford Focus RS WRC 04

=== Itinerary ===
All dates and times are EEST (UTC+3).

Date	No.	Time span	Stage name	Distance
22 September	SS1	After 9:43	Xyliatos 1	8.09 km
22 September	SS2	After 10:04	Kaspouras 1	10.17 km
22 September	SS3	After 10:37	Asinou 1	25.61 km
22 September	SS4	After 12:05	Kato Amiantos 1	11.87 km
22 September		13:20	Service A, Lemesos	—N/a
22 September	SS5	After 15:03	Xyliantos 2	8.09 km
22 September	SS6	After 15:24	Kaspouras 2	10.17 km
22 September	SS7	After 15:57	Asinou 2	25.61 km
22 September	SS8	After 17:25	Kato Amiantos 2	11.87 km
22 September		18:20	Service B, Lemesos	—N/a
23 September		7:45	Service C, Lemesos	—N/a
23 September	SS9	After 8:38	Kellaki 1	9.49 km
23 September	SS10	After 9:16	Akrounta 1	7.99 km
23 September	SS11	After 10:34	Foini 1	30.33 km
23 September	SS12	After 11:32	Galatareia 1	13.33 km
23 September		13:12	Service D, Lemesos	—N/a
23 September	SS13	After 14:25	Kellaki 2	9.49 km
23 September	SS14	After 15:03	Akrounta 2	7.99 km
23 September	SS15	After 16:21	Foini 2	30.33 km
23 September	SS16	After 17:19	Galatareia 2	13.33 km
23 September		18:39	Service E, Lemesos	—N/a
24 September		7:41	Service F, Lemesos	—N/a
24 September	SS17	After 8:54	Vavatsinia 1	25.24 km
24 September	SS18	After 9:52	Machairas 1	12.94 km
24 September	SS19	After 10:35	Lageia	28.55 km
24 September		11:42	Service G, Lemesos	—N/a
24 September	~~SS20~~	~~After 12:35~~	~~Down Town~~	~~3.40 km~~
24 September		12:55	Service H, Lemesos	—N/a
24 September	SS21	After 14:03	Vavatsinia 2	25.24 km
24 September	SS22	After 14:56	Machairas 2	12.94 km
24 September		16:27	Service I, Lemesos	—N/a

== Report ==
=== Overall ===
==== Summary ====
Friday began with multiple drivers suffering from issues. Gronholm struggled with dust in the car and overheating issues, but would still set the quickest opening three stage times of the day, putting him in the lead. Loeb was not too far behind, hindered by being the first on the road. Petter Solberg suffered from numerous issues including a puncture, brake issues, and overheating, but still managed to put in the fastest time in stage 4. His poor luck would continue, however, as he would have gear issues on the next few stages. Sordo, Gardemeister, and Wilson also suffered from serious mechanical issues. By the end of the day, Gronholm continued to lead, but Loeb had cut heavily into his advantage.

Saturday morning would see Gronholm and Loeb trading stage wins, with under 10 seconds between them for the entirety of the stint. The pair were over two and a half minutes quicker than Hirvonen in third by the time they reached the mid-day service. The afternoon, however, would be a dominant performance by Loeb, who took the lead and ended the day with over 20 seconds in hand. Gronholm blamed his struggles on a poor tyre choice. Atkinson would retire in a ditch in stage 15, while Henning Solberg struggled all day with a hot water leak spraying on he and his co-driver's face.

On Friday, Loeb would continue to extend his advantage over Gronholm, and while the Finn would take some time back in stages 18 and 19, he admitted that he believed the rally to be lost by Service G. Due to spectator concerns, Stage 20 would be cancelled, replaced by a simple demonstration through the streets. Despite this, Sordo would crash heavily in the stage, requiring extensive cleanup. This would result in Stage 21 being cancelled as well, but only after the Fords of Wilson and Companc had passed through, necessitating nominal times. Loeb would continue through the final stage to win the rally, his last victory of the season, with Gronholm finishing second. Loeb's victory would extend his championship lead to 35 points, with only 40 points available in the remaining rounds. Hirvonen would finish a distant 3rd, over five minutes behind Loeb. Petter Solberg would finish behind his brother Henning after striking a rock in the final stage.

==== Classification ====
Position		No.	Driver	Co-driver	Entrant	Car	Time	Difference	Points
Event	Class	No.	Driver	Co-driver	Entrant	Car	Time	Difference	Points
1	1	1	(France) Sebastien Loeb	(Monaco) Daniel Elena	Kronos Racing	Citroën Xsara WRC	4:40:50.4	0.0	10
2	2	3	(Finland) Marcus Grönholm	(Finland) Timo Rautiainen	BP Ford World Rally Team	Ford Focus RS WRC 06	4:41:11.6	+21.2	8
3	3	4	(Finland) Mikko Hirvonen	(Finland) Jarmo Lehtinen	BP Ford World Rally Team	Ford Focus RS WRC 06	4:46:06.5	+5:16.1	6
4	4	7	(Austria) Manfred Stohl	(Austria) Ilka Minor	OMV Peugeot Norway World Rally Team	Peugeot 307 WRC	4:47:30.1	+6:39.7	5
5	5	14	(Finland) Toni Gardemeister	(Finland) Jakke Honkanen	Astra Racing	Citroën Xsara WRC	4:49:30.8	+8:40.4	4
6	6	8	(Norway) Henning Solberg	(Norway) Cato Menkerud	OMV Peugeot Norway World Rally Team	Peugeot 307 WRC	4:55:30.4	+14:40.0	3
7	7	15	(Spain) Xavier Pons	(Spain) Carlos Del Barrio	Kronos Racing	Citroën Xsara WRC	4:55:37.1	+14:46.7	2
8	8	5	(Norway) Petter Solberg	(United Kingdom) Phil Mills	Subaru World Rally Team	Subaru Impreza WRC	4:56:11.9	+15:21.5	1
9	9	6	(Australia) Chris Atkinson	(Australia) Glenn MacNeall	Subaru World Rally Team	Subaru Impreza WRC	4:58:05.4	+17:15.0	0
10	10	9	(United Kingdom) Matthew Wilson	(United Kingdom) Michael Orr	Stobart VK M-Sport Ford Rally Team	Ford Focus RS WRC 04	5:06:11.4	+25:21.0	0
14	11	10	(Argentina) Luis Perez Companc	(Argentina) Jose Maria Volta	Stobart VK M-Sport Ford Rally Team	Ford Focus RS WRC 04	5:20:51.3	+40:00.9	0
Retired SS21		2	(Spain) Dani Sordo	(Spain) Marc Marti	Kronos Citroën World Rally Team	Citroën Xsara WRC	Accident		0
Retired SS18		17	(Argentina) Juan Pablo Raies	(Argentina) Jorge Perez Companc	Stobart VK M-Sport Ford Rally Team	Ford Focus RS WRC 04	Co-Driver Ill		0
Retired SS2		11	(Finland) Harri Rovanperä	(Finland) Risto Pietiläinen	Red Bull Škoda Team	Škoda Fabia WRC	Electrical		0
Retired SS2		12	(Austria) Andreas Aigner	(Germany) Klaus Wicha	Red Bull Škoda Team	Škoda Fabia WRC	Electrical		0

==== Special Stages ====
All dates and times are EEST (UTC+3).

Day	Stage	Time	Name	Length (km)	Winner	Time	Rally leader
1 (22 Sep)	SS1	09:43	Xyliatos 1	8.90	(Finland) Marcus Grönholm	7:43.3	(Finland) Marcus Grönholm
1 (22 Sep)	SS2	10:04	Kaspouras 1	10.17	(Finland) Marcus Grönholm	9:14.1	(Finland) Marcus Grönholm
1 (22 Sep)	SS3	10:37	Asinou 1	25.61	(Finland) Marcus Grönholm	26:52.4	(Finland) Marcus Grönholm
1 (22 Sep)	SS4	12:05	Kato Amiantos 1	11.86	(Norway) Petter Solberg	9:33.4	(Finland) Marcus Grönholm
1 (22 Sep)	SS5	15:03	Xyliatos 2	8.90	(Finland) Marcus Grönholm	7:26.5	(Finland) Marcus Grönholm
1 (22 Sep)	SS6	15:24	Kaspouras 2	10.17	(France) Sébastien Loeb	8:56.4	(Finland) Marcus Grönholm
1 (22 Sep)	SS7	15:57	Asinou 2	25.61	(France) Sébastien Loeb	26:07.1	(Finland) Marcus Grönholm
1 (22 Sep)	SS8	17:25	Kato Amiantos 2	11.86	(France) Sébastien Loeb	9:26.8	(Finland) Marcus Grönholm
2 (23 Sep)	SS9	08:38	Kellaki 1	9.48	(Finland) Marcus Grönholm	8:01.4	(Finland) Marcus Grönholm
2 (23 Sep)	SS10	09:16	Akrounta 1	7.98	(Finland) Marcus Grönholm	7:44.9	(Finland) Marcus Grönholm
2 (23 Sep)	SS11	10:34	Foini 1	30.32	(France) Sébastien Loeb	26:20.8	(Finland) Marcus Grönholm
2 (23 Sep)	SS12	11:32	Galatareia 1	13.32	(France) Sébastien Loeb	8:17.8	(Finland) Marcus Grönholm
2 (23 Sep)	SS13	14:25	Kellaki 2	9.48	(France) Sébastien Loeb	8:01.7	(Finland) Marcus Grönholm
2 (23 Sep)	SS14	15:03	Akrounta 2	7.98	(France) Sébastien Loeb	7:35.4	(France) Sébastien Loeb
2 (23 Sep)	SS15	16:21	Foini 2	30.32	(France) Sébastien Loeb	25:56.1	(France) Sébastien Loeb
2 (23 Sep)	SS16	17:19	Galatareia 2	13.32	(France) Sébastien Loeb	8:09.7	(France) Sébastien Loeb
3 (24 Sep)	SS17	08:54	Vavatsinia 1	25.23	(France) Sébastien Loeb	22:24.1	(France) Sébastien Loeb
3 (24 Sep)	SS18	09:52	Machairas 1	12.93	(Finland) Marcus Grönholm	10:56.6	(France) Sébastien Loeb
3 (24 Sep)	SS19	10:35	Lageia	8.98	(Finland) Marcus Grönholm	7:21.6	(France) Sébastien Loeb
3 (24 Sep)	SS20	12:35	Down Town	3.40	Stage Cancelled		(France) Sébastien Loeb
3 (24 Sep)	SS21	14:03	Vavatsinia 2	25.23	(France) Sébastien Loeb	23:19.8	(France) Sébastien Loeb
3 (24 Sep)	SS22	14:56	Machairas 2	12.93	(Finland) Marcus Grönholm	10:48.8	(France) Sébastien Loeb

==== Championship Standings ====
Pos.	Drivers' Championship			Manufacturers' Championship		
Pos.	Move	Driver	Points	Move	Manufacturer	Points
1		(France) Sébastien Loeb	112		(Belgium) Kronos Citroën World Rally Team	142
2		(Finland) Marcus Gronholm	77		(United Kingdom) BP Ford World Rally Team	135
3		(Spain) Dani Sordo	41		(Japan) Subaru World Rally Team	79
4		(Finland) Mikko Hirvonen	39		OMV Peugeot Norway World Rally Team	59
5		(Austria) Manfred Stohl	33		(United Kingdom) Stobart VK M-Sport Ford Rally Team	30

=== Production WRC ===
==== Classification ====
Position		No.	Driver	Co-driver	Entrant	Car	Time	Difference	Points
Event	Class	No.	Driver	Co-driver	Entrant	Car	Time	Difference	Points
11	1	33	(Japan) Fumio Nutahara	(United Kingdom) Daniel Barritt	Advan-Piaa Rally Team	Mitsubishi Lancer Evo IX	5:10:43.3	0.0	10
12	2	45	(Finland) Aki Teiskonen	(Finland) Miikka Anttila	Syms Rally Team	Subaru Impreza WRX STI	5:15:00.8	+4:17.5	8
13	3	41	(United Arab Emirates) Khalid Al-Qassimi	(United Kingdom) Nicky Beech	Subaru Team Quasys	Subaru Impreza WRX STI	5:16:42.5	+5:59.2	6
15	4	40	(Italy) Simone Campedelli	(Italy) Danilo Fappani	Errani Team Group	Mitsubishi Lancer Evo VIII	5:22:14.4	+11:31.1	5
19	5	39	(Qatar) Nasser Al-Attiyah	(United Kingdom) Chris Patterson	QMMF	Subaru Impreza WRX STI	5:34:48.3	+24:05.0	4
22	6	31	(Japan) Toshihiro Arai	(New Zealand) Tony Sircombe	Subaru Team Arai	Subaru Impreza WRX STI	5:43:47.9	+33:04.6	3
Retired SS15		60	(Cyprus) Spyros Pavlides	(Cyprus) Theodoros Vassiliades	Spyros Pavlides	Subaru Impreza WRX STI	Mechanical		0
Retired SS11		43	(Germany) Aaron Burkart	(Germany) Tanja Geilhausen	OMV CEE World Rally Team	Mitsubishi Lancer Evo VIII	Accident		0
Retired SS5		59	(Cyprus) Andreas Tsouloftas	(Cyprus) Savvas Laos	Andreas Tsouloftas	Mitsubishi Lancer Evo IX	Excluded		0
Retired SS4		46	(United Kingdom) Nigel Heath	(United Kingdom) Steve Lancaster	PSM Motorsport	Subaru Impreza WRX STI	Mechanical		0

==== Championship Standings ====
Pos.	Drivers' Championship		
Pos.	Move	Driver	Points
1		(Qatar) Nasser Al-Attiyah	38
2		(Japan) Fumio Nutahara	30
3		(San Marino) Mirco Baldacci	19
=	3	(Finland) Aki Teiskonen	19
5		(Japan) Toshihiro Arai	18

Previous event: 2006 Rally Japan	FIA World Rally Championship, 2006 season	Next event: 2006 Rally of Turkey
Previous year: 2005 Cyprus Rally	Cyprus Rally	Next year: N/A
