= 2006 Rallye Deutschland =

Rally championship round

2006 Rallye Deutschland: 25. Rallye Deutschland
Round 9 of 16 in the 2006 World Rally Championship
← Previous event	Next event →
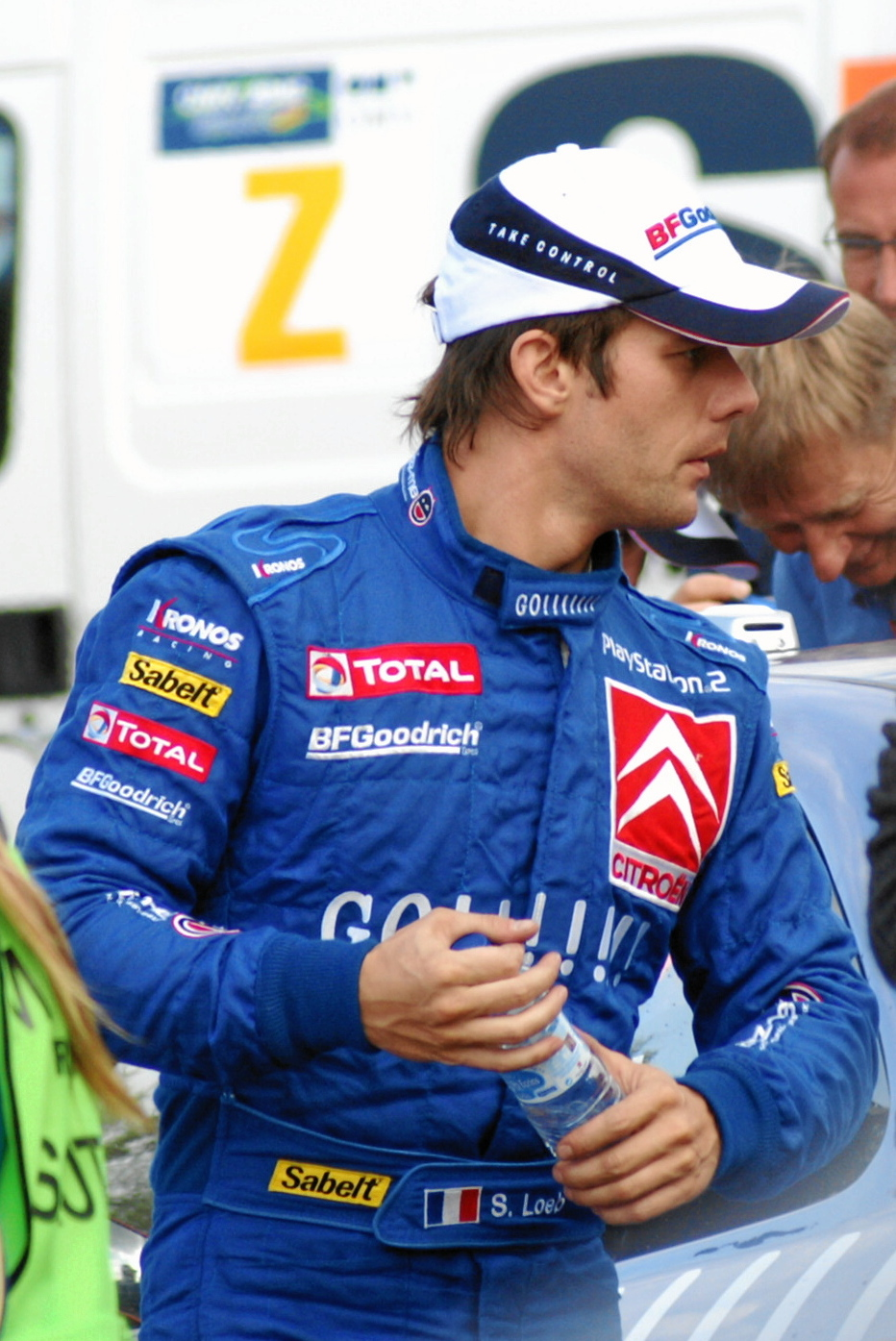
- Rally winner Sébastien Loeb
- Host country: Germany
- Rally base: Trier
- Dates run: 11 – 13 August 2006
- Stages: 19 (349.11 km; 216.93 miles)
- Stage surface: Tarmac
- Transport distance: 951.37 km (591.15 miles)
- Overall distance: 1,300.48 km (808.08 miles)

Statistics
- Crews registered: 73
- Crews: 73 at start, 56 at finish

Overall results
- Overall winner: (France) Sebastien Loeb (Monaco) Daniel Elena (Belgium) Kronos Citroën World Rally Team; 3:28:34.1

Support category results
- J-WRC winner: (United Kingdom) Kris Meeke (United Kingdom) Glenn Patterson (France) PH Sport; 3:54:00.7

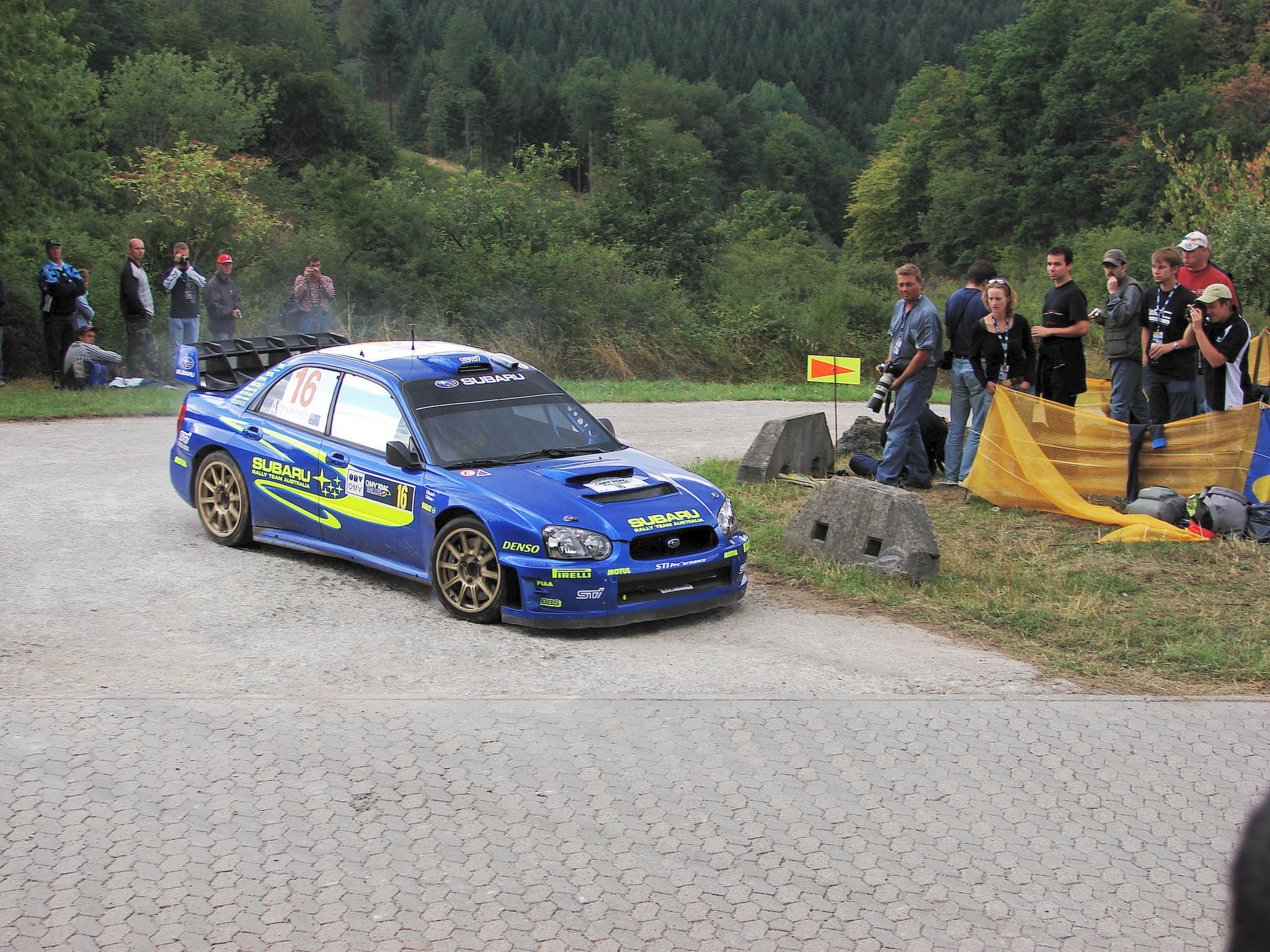
Chris Atkinson during one of the special stages.

The 2006 OMV ADAC Rallye Deutschland was a motor racing event for rally cars that was held over three days between 11 and 13 August 2006. It marked the 25th running of the Rallye Deutschland, and was the ninth round of the 2006 World Rally Championship season. The event was also the sixth round of the 2006 Junior WRC. The 2006 event was based in the city of Trier in Germany and was contested over nineteen special stages, covering a total competitive distance of 349.11 km (216.93 miles).

Marcus Gronholm, along with BP Ford World Rally Team were the defending rally winners, trailing championship rival Sebastien Loeb in the championship by 29 points. OMV Peugeot Norway World Rally Team would not participate in the round as a manufacturer.

Loeb and co-driver Daniel Elena won the rally, their first rally win since the 2006 Rally d'Italia Sardegna and their sixth win of the season.

== Background ==
=== Entry list ===
The following crews were set to enter the rally. The event was open to crews competing in the World Rally Championship and its support category, the Junior WRC, as well as privateer entries that were not registered to score points in the manufacturer's championship. Twenty Four were entered under World Rally Car regulations, as were thirteen in the Junior WRC category.

World Rally Car entries competing in the World Rally Championship
No.	Driver	Co-Driver	Entrant	Car	Tyre
1	(France) Sebastien Loeb	(Monaco) Daniel Elena	(Belgium) Kronos Citroën World Rally Team	Citroën Xsara WRC	BF
2	(Spain) Dani Sordo	(Spain) Marc Martí	(Belgium) Kronos Citroën World Rally Team	Citroën Xsara WRC	BF
3	(Finland) Marcus Gronholm	(Finland) Timo Rautiainen	(United Kingdom) BP Ford World Rally Team	Ford Focus RS WRC 06	BF
4	(Finland) Mikko Hirvonen	(Finland) Jarmo Lehtinen	(United Kingdom) BP Ford World Rally Team	Ford Focus RS WRC 06	BF
5	(Norway) Petter Solberg	(United Kingdom) Phil Mills	(Japan) Subaru World Rally Team	Impreza WRC 2006	P
6	(France) Stephane Sarrazin	(Belgium) Stephane Prevot	(Japan) Subaru World Rally Team	Impreza WRC 2006	P
7	(Austria) Manfred Stohl	(Austria) Ilka Minor	OMV Peugeot Norway World Rally Team	Peugeot 307 WRC	BF
9	(United Kingdom) Matthew Wilson	(United Kingdom) Michael Orr	(United Kingdom) Stobart VK M-Sport Ford Rally Team	Ford Focus RS WRC 04	BF
10	(Finland) Jari-Matti Latvala	(Finland) Miikka Anttila	(United Kingdom) Stobart VK M-Sport Ford Rally Team	Ford Focus RS WRC 04	BF
11	(Sweden) Mattias Ekstrom	(Sweden) Jonas Andersson	(Austria) Red Bull Škoda Team	Škoda Fabia WRC	BF
12	(Austria) Andreas Aigner	(Germany) Klaus Wicha	(Austria) Red Bull Škoda Team	Škoda Fabia WRC	BF

Super 1600 entries competing in the Junior WRC
No.	Driver	Co-Driver	Entrant	Car
32	(United Kingdom) Kris Meeke	(United Kingdom) Glenn Patterson	(France) PH Sport	Citroën C2 S1600
36	(Italy) Luca Betti	(Italy) Piercarlo Capolongo	(Italy) Autorel Sport	Renault Clio S1600
37	(Czech Republic) Pavel Valoušek	(Czech Republic) Zdeněk Hrůza	(Japan) Suzuki Sport Europe	Suzuki Swift 1600
39	(Zimbabwe) Conrad Rautenbach	(United Kingdom) David Senior	(France) Barroso Sport	Renault Clio 1600
42	(France) Julien Pressac	(France) Jack Boyere	(France) PH Sport	Citroën C2 S1600
44	(Poland) Michał Kościuszko	(Czech Republic) Jaroslaw Baran	(Japan) Suzuki Sport Europe	Suzuki Swift 1600
49	(Czech Republic) Martin Prokop	(Czech Republic) Jan Tománek	(Czech Republic) Jipocar Czech National Team	Citroën C2 S1600
50	(Finland) Kalle Pinomäki	(Finland) Jani Laaksonen	(Finland) Clio Junior Team	Renault Clio 1600
51	(Turkey) Fatih Kara	(Turkey) Cerm Bakancocuklari	(France) Renault Sport	Renault Clio 1600
52	(Belgium) Bernd Casier	(Belgium) Frédéric Miclotte	(France) Renault Sport	Renault Clio 1600
53	(United Kingdom) Barry Clark	(United Kingdom) Scott Martin	(United Kingdom) Stobart VK M-Sport Ford Rally Team	Ford Fiesta ST
54	(Germany) Aaron Burkart	(Germany) Tanja Geilhausen	(Austria) OMV Rally Team	Citroën C2 S1600
55	(France) Brice Tirabassi	(France) Gabrice Gordon	(France) PH Sport	Citroën C2 R2

Other major entries
No.	Driver	Co-Driver	Entrant	Car
14	(Finland) Toni Gardemeister	(Finland) Jakke Honkanen	(Italy) Astra Racing	Citroën Xsara WRC
15	(Spain) Xavier Pons	(Spain) Carlos del Barrio	(Belgium) Kronos Racing	Citroën Xsara WRC
16	(Australia) Chris Atkinson	(Australia) Glenn Macneall	Subaru Rally Team Australia	Subaru Impreza S11 WRC 05
17	(Czech Republic) Jan Kopecký	(Czech Republic) Filip Schovánek	(Czech Republic) Czech RT Škoda Kopecký	Škoda Fabia WRC
18	(Belgium) François Duval	(France) Patrick Pivato	(Belgium) First Motorsport Škoda	Škoda Fabia WRC
20	(Republic of Ireland) Gareth MacHale	(Republic of Ireland) Paul Nagle	(Republic of Ireland) Tom Hogan Motors	Ford Focus RS WRC
21	(Germany) Matthias Kahle	(Germany) Peter Göbel	(Germany) Skoda Auto Deutschland	Škoda Fabia WRC
22	(Belgium) Pieter Tsjoen	(Belgium) Eddy Chevaillier	(Belgium) Pieter Tsjoen	Ford Focus RS WRC
23	(Czech Republic) Štěpán Vojtěch	(Czech Republic) Ernst Michal	(Czech Republic) Štěpán Vojtěch	Peugeot 307 WRC
24	(Denmark) Kristian Poulsen	(Denmark) Ole Refsgaard Frederikson	(Denmark) Kristian Poulsen	Toyota Corolla WRC
25	(Netherlands) Erik Wevers	(Belgium) Filip Godde	(Netherlands) Erik Wevers	Toyota Corolla WRC
61	(Netherlands) Mark van Eldik	(Belgium) Erwin Mombaerts	(Netherlands) Mark van Eldik	Subaru Impreza S10 WRC 04
62	(United Kingdom) Gareth Jones	(Republic of Ireland) David Moynihan	(United Kingdom) Gareth Jones	Subaru Impreza S9 WRC 03

=== Itinerary ===
All dates and times are CEST (UTC+2).

Date	No.	Time span	Stage name	Distance
10 August	—	After 8:00	Bosen [Shakedown]	3.35 km
11 August		8:30	Service A, Trier	—N/a
11 August	SS1	After 9:23	Ruwertal / Fell 1	24.40 km
11 August	SS2	After 10:06	Dhrontal 1	11:14 km
11 August	SS3	After 10:51	Grafschaft Veldenz 1	17.12 km
11 August	SS4	After 11:41	Moselwein 1	16.97 km
11 August		11:58	Service B, Trier	—N/a
11 August	SS5	After 14:34	Ruwertal / Fell 2	24.40 km
11 August	SS6	After 15:17	Dhrontal 2	11:14 km
11 August	SS7	After 16:02	Grafschaft Veldenz 2	17.12 km
11 August	SS8	After 16:52	Moselwein 2	16.97 km
11 August		18:07	Service C, Trier	—N/a
12 August		7:55	Service D, Trier	—N/a
12 August	SS9	After 8:36	Bosenberg 1	22.52 km
12 August	SS10	After 9:44	Panzerplatte 1	30.65 km
12 August		10:44	Service E, Trier	—N/a
12 August	SS11	After 12:17	Erzweiler 1	18:21 km
12 August	SS12	After 12:55	Panzerplatte 2	30.65 km
12 August		13:55	Service F, Trier	—N/a
12 August	SS13	After 15:28	Erzweiler 2	18:21 km
12 August	SS14	After 16:31	Bosenberg 2	22.52 km
12 August	SS15	After 17:19	OMV SS St. Wendel	5.84 km
12 August		17:59	Service G, Trier	—N/a
13 August		7:55	Service H, Trier	—N/a
13 August	SS16	After 8:38	Freisen / Westrich 1	19.60 km
13 August	SS17	After 9:23	Birkenfelder Land	13.68 km
13 August	SS18	After 10:11	St. Wendeler Land	16.37 km
13 August	SS19	After 10:44	Freisen / Westrich 2	19.60 km

== Report ==
=== Overall ===
==== Summary ====
Thursday's shakedown would be a dramatic one, with Petter Solberg crashing out due to setup-related understeer. His mechanics were able to rebuild the car in time for the event. His teammate Sarrazin would win the shakedown.

Friday would see Loeb take an early lead and extend it throughout the morning, while his biggest competitor was Sordo in second. Gronholm would have a mediocre start, going off the road multiple time sin the opening stage. By the end of the day, Loeb would pull a gap of over forty seconds to the Spaniard.

It would be up to Sordo to close the gap on Saturday, which would see changing weather conditions. While he was able to bring the gap down to under thirty seconds, he was unable to truly compete for the win at the beginning of the weekend. Gardemeister would hold a comfortable third ahead of Gronholm, who was hindered by a poor tyre choice. Solberg would suffer from engine issues and retired from the second day. Privateer Jan Kopecky would take a surprise win in the ninth stage, while Pons went off the road and dropped to twelfth. Gronholm would make a recovery to third by the end of the day, as Gardemeister struggled. The leading duo were ordered to hold position and cruise to a 1–2.

Sunday would have very little change in the points paying positions, as Loeb and Sordo cruised home in their previous positions. Loeb had led the rally on every stage, and by winning the rally, equaled the record for the most World Rally wins at twenty six. Gronholm would finish third ahead of Gardemeister and Hirvonen. Skoda rookie Aigner would book an impressive sxth, along with privateer Kopecky in seventh.

==== Classification ====
Position		No.	Driver	Co-driver	Entrant	Car	Time	Difference	Points
Event	Class	No.	Driver	Co-driver	Entrant	Car	Time	Difference	Points
1	1	1	(France) Sebastien Loeb	(Monaco) Daniel Elena	(Belgium) Kronos Citroën World Rally Team	Citroën Xsara WRC	3:28:34.1	0.0	10
2	2	2	(Spain) Dani Sordo	(Spain) Marc Martí	(Belgium) Kronos Citroën World Rally Team	Citroën Xsara WRC	3:29:07.9	+33.8	8
3	3	3	(Finland) Marcus Gronholm	(Finland) Timo Rautiainen	(United Kingdom) BP Ford World Rally Team	Ford Focus RS WRC 06	3:30:53.3	+2:19.2	6
4	4	14	(Finland) Toni Gardemeister	(Finland) Jakke Honkanen	(Italy) Astra Racing	Citroën Xsara WRC	3:31:07.9	+2:33.8	5
5	5	7	(Austria) Manfred Stohl	(Austria) Ilka Minor	OMV Peugeot Norway World Rally Team	Peugeot 307 WRC	3:33:00.0	+4:25.9	4
6	6	12	(Austria) Andreas Aigner	(Germany) Klaus Wicha	(Austria) Red Bull Škoda Team	Škoda Fabia WRC	3:34:16.7	+5:42.6	3
7	7	17	(Czech Republic) Jan Kopecký	(Czech Republic) Filip Schovánek	(Czech Republic) Czech RT Škoda Kopecký	Škoda Fabia WRC	3:34:19.9	+5:45.8	2
8	8	16	(Australia) Chris Atkinson	(Australia) Glenn Macneall	Subaru Rally Team Australia	Subaru Impreza S11 WRC 05	3:35:59.1	+7:25.0	1
9	9	4	(Finland) Mikko Hirvonen	(Finland) Jarmo Lehtinen	(United Kingdom) BP Ford World Rally Team	Ford Focus RS WRC 06	3:36:59.8	+8:25.7	0
10	10	20	(Republic of Ireland) Gareth MacHale	(Republic of Ireland) Paul Nagle	(Republic of Ireland) Tom Hogan Motors	Ford Focus RS WRC	3:41:30.2	+12:56.1	0
11	11	11	(Sweden) Mattias Ekstrom	(Sweden) Jonas Andersson	(Austria) Red Bull Škoda Team	Škoda Fabia WRC	3:46:14.0	+17:39.9	0
12	12	9	(United Kingdom) Matthew Wilson	(United Kingdom) Michael Orr	(United Kingdom) Stobart VK M-Sport Ford Rally Team	Ford Focus RS WRC 04	3:47:09.0	+18:34.9	0
13	13	25	(Netherlands) Erik Wevers	(Belgium) Filip Godde	(Netherlands) Erik Wevers	Toyota Corolla WRC	3:47:57.0	+19:22.9	0
14	14	15	(Spain) Xavier Pons	(Spain) Carlos del Barrio	(Belgium) Kronos Racing	Citroën Xsara WRC	3:50:43.7	+22:09.6	0
15	15	24	(Denmark) Kristian Poulsen	(Denmark) Ole Refsgaard Frederikson	(Denmark) Kristian Poulsen	Toyota Corolla WRC	3:52:37.8	+24:03.7	0
24	16	61	(Netherlands) Mark van Eldik	(Belgium) Erwin Mombaerts	(Netherlands) Mark van Eldik	Subaru Impreza S10 WRC 04	3:59:40.7	+31:06.6	0
34	17	10	(Finland) Jari-Matti Latvala	(Finland) Miikka Anttila	(United Kingdom) Stobart VK M-Sport Ford Rally Team	Ford Focus RS WRC 04	4:17:31.3	+48:57.2	0
43	18	62	(United Kingdom) Gareth Jones	(Republic of Ireland) David Moynihan	(United Kingdom) Gareth Jones	Subaru Impreza S9 WRC 03	4:26:01.1	+57:27.0	0
Retired SS16		6	(France) Stephane Sarrazin	(Belgium) Stephane Prevot	(Japan) Subaru World Rally Team	Impreza WRC 2006	Gearbox		0
Retired SS14		21	(Germany) Matthias Kahle	(Germany) Peter Göbel	(Germany) Skoda Auto Deutschland	Škoda Fabia WRC	Engine		0
Retired SS11		22	(Belgium) Pieter Tsjoen	(Belgium) Eddy Chevaillier	(Belgium) Pieter Tsjoen	Ford Focus RS WRC	Mechanical		0
Retired SS10		23	(Czech Republic) Štěpán Vojtěch	(Czech Republic) Ernst Michal	(Czech Republic) Štěpán Vojtěch	Peugeot 307 WRC	Accident		0
Retired SS9		5	(Norway) Petter Solberg	(United Kingdom) Phil Mills	(Japan) Subaru World Rally Team	Impreza WRC 2006	Engine		0
Retired SS9		18	(Belgium) François Duval	(France) Patrick Pivato	(Belgium) First Motorsport Škoda	Škoda Fabia WRC	Retired		0

==== Special Stages ====
All dates and times are CEST (UTC+2).

Day	Stage	Time	Name	Length (km)	Winner	Time	Rally leader
1 (11 August)	SS1	9:23	Ruwertal/Fell 1	20.04	(France) Sébastien Loeb	11:44.6	(France) Sébastien Loeb
1 (11 August)	SS2	10:06	Dhrontal 1	11.14	(Spain) Daniel Sordo	7:18.7	(France) Sébastien Loeb
1 (11 August)	SS3	10:51	Grafschaft Veldenz 1	17.72	(France) Sébastien Loeb	10:49.8	(France) Sébastien Loeb
1 (11 August)	SS4	11:41	Moselwein 1	16.97	(Spain) Daniel Sordo	10:23.3	(France) Sébastien Loeb
1 (11 August)	SS5	14:34	Ruwerthal/Fell 2	20.04	(France) Sébastien Loeb	11:34.3	(France) Sébastien Loeb
1 (11 August)	SS6	15:17	Dhrontal 2	11.14	(Spain) Daniel Sordo	7:18.2	(France) Sébastien Loeb
1 (11 August)	SS7	16:02	Grafschaft Veldenz 2	23.76	(Finland) Marcus Grönholm	16:54.1	(France) Sébastien Loeb
1 (11 August)	SS8	16:52	Moselwein 2	16.97	(France) Sébastien Loeb	10:20.4	(France) Sébastien Loeb
2 (12 August)	SS9	8:36	Bosenberg 1	22.52	(Czech Republic) Jan Kopecký	13:02.7	(France) Sébastien Loeb
2 (12 August)	SS10	9:44	Panzerplatte 1	30.65	(Spain) Daniel Sordo	18:09.5	(France) Sébastien Loeb
2 (12 August)	SS11	12:17	Erzweiler 1	18.21	(Finland) Mikko Hirvonen	10:46.0	(France) Sébastien Loeb
2 (12 August)	SS12	12:55	Panzerplatte 2	30.65	(Finland) Marcus Grönholm	18:03.5	(France) Sébastien Loeb
2 (12 August)	SS13	15:28	Erzweiler 2	18.21	(Finland) Marcus Grönholm	10:42.4	(France) Sébastien Loeb
2 (12 August)	SS14	16:31	Bosenberg 2	22.52	(Czech Republic) Jan Kopecký	12:45.0	(France) Sébastien Loeb
2 (12 August)	SS15	17:19	OMV SS St Wendel	5.84	(France) Sébastien Loeb	3:05.0	(France) Sébastien Loeb
3 (13 August)	SS16	8:38	Freisen/Westrich 1	19.06	(Finland) Toni Gardemeister	11:40.4	(France) Sébastien Loeb
3 (13 August)	SS17	9:23	Birkenfelder Land	13.68	(Spain) Daniel Sordo	7:52.3	(France) Sébastien Loeb
3 (13 August)	SS18	10:11	St Wendeler Land	16.37	(Finland) Toni Gardemeister	9:08.6	(France) Sébastien Loeb
3 (13 August)	SS19	10:44	Freisen/Westrich 2	19.06	(Finland) Toni Gardemeister	11:50.8	(France) Sébastien Loeb

==== Championship Standings ====
Pos.	Drivers' Championship			Manufacturers' Championship		
Pos.	Move	Driver	Points	Move	Manufacturer	Points
1		(France) Sébastien Loeb	84		(Belgium) Kronos Citroën World Rally Team	114
2		(Finland) Marcus Gronholm	51		(United Kingdom) BP Ford World Rally Team	91
3		(Spain) Dani Sordo	41		(Japan) Subaru World Rally Team	63
4	1	(Austria) Manfred Stohl	24		OMV Peugeot Norway World Rally Team	41
5	1	(Finland) Mikko Hirvonen	21	1	(Austria) Red Bull Škoda Team	22

=== Junior WRC ===
==== Classification ====
Position		No.	Driver	Co-driver	Entrant	Car	Time	Difference	Points
Event	Class	No.	Driver	Co-driver	Entrant	Car	Time	Difference	Points
16	1	32	(United Kingdom) Kris Meeke	(United Kingdom) Glenn Patterson	(France) PH Sport	Citroën C2 S1600	3:54:00.7	0.0	10
17	2	52	(Belgium) Bernd Casier	(Belgium) Frédéric Miclotte	(France) Renault Sport	Renault Clio 1600	3:54:39.3	+38.6	8
19	3	37	(Czech Republic) Pavel Valoušek	(Czech Republic) Zdeněk Hrůza	(Japan) Suzuki Sport Europe	Suzuki Swift 1600	3:55:29.4	+1:28.7	6
20	4	42	(France) Julien Pressac	(France) Jack Boyere	(France) PH Sport	Citroën C2 S1600	3:55:33.2	+1:32.5	5
25	5	49	(Czech Republic) Martin Prokop	(Czech Republic) Jan Tománek	(Czech Republic) Jipocar Czech National Team	Citroën C2 S1600	3:57:09.6	+3:08.9	4
23	6	54	(Germany) Aaron Burkart	(Germany) Tanja Geilhausen	(Austria) OMV Rally Team	Citroën C2 S1600	3:59:23.5	+5:22.8	3
25	7	51	(Turkey) Fatih Kara	(Turkey) Cerm Bakancocuklari	(France) Renault Sport	Renault Clio 1600	4:05:50.5	+8:49.8	2
26	8	36	(Italy) Luca Betti	(Italy) Piercarlo Capolongo	(Italy) Autorel Sport	Renault Clio S1600	4:03:48.7	+9:48.0	1
33	9	39	(Zimbabwe) Conrad Rautenbach	(United Kingdom) David Senior	(France) Barroso Sport	Renault Clio 1600	4:15:22.1	+21:21.4	0
35	10	53	(United Kingdom) Barry Clark	(United Kingdom) Scott Martin	(United Kingdom) Stobart VK M-Sport Ford Rally Team	Ford Fiesta ST	4:18:13.7	+24:13.0	0
46	11	44	(Poland) Michał Kościuszko	(Czech Republic) Jaroslaw Baran	(Japan) Suzuki Sport Europe	Suzuki Swift 1600	4:29:17.3	+35:16.6	0
Retired SS9		50	(Finland) Kalle Pinomäki	(Finland) Jani Laaksonen	(Finland) Clio Junior Team	Renault Clio 1600	Engine		0
Retired SS9		55	(France) Brice Tirabassi	(France) Gabrice Gordon	(France) PH Sport	Citroën C2 R2	Accident		0

==== Championship Standings ====
Pos.	Drivers' Championship		
Pos.	Move	Driver	Points
1		(Sweden) Patrik Sandell	26
2		(Sweden) Jonas Andersson	21
3		(Estonia) Urmo Aava	20
4		(Zimbabwe) Conrad Rautenbach	17
5	4	(United Kingdom) Kris Meeke	16
