= Juuso Pykälistö =

Finnish rally driver (born 1975)

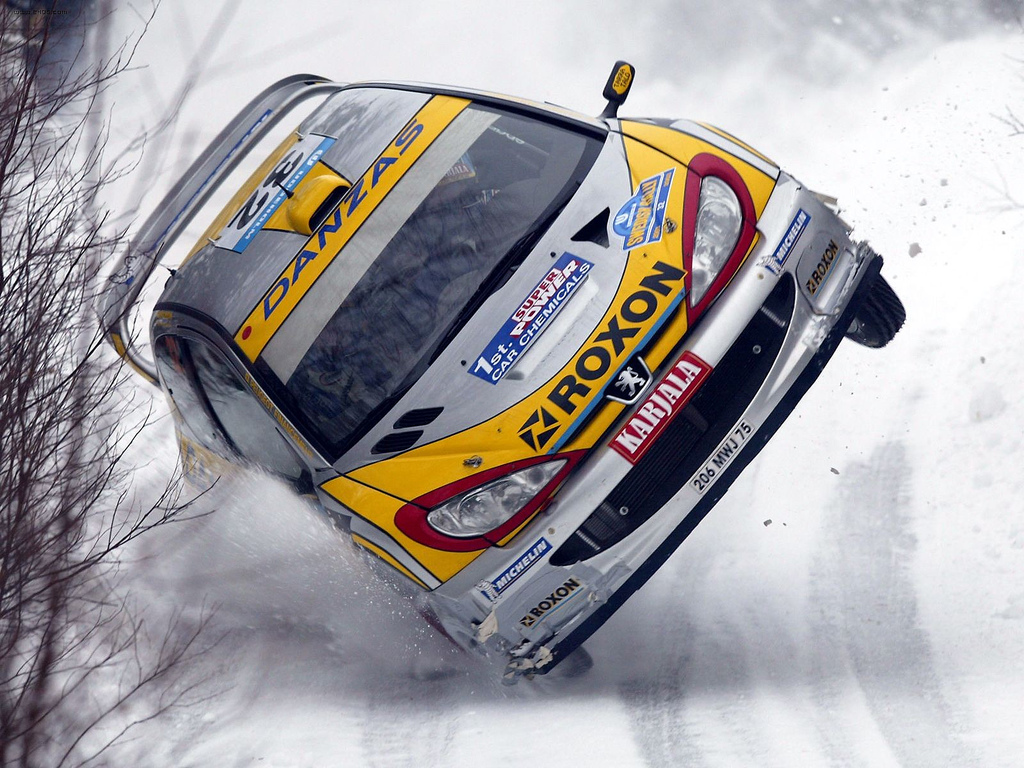
- Juuso Pykälistö driving a Peugeot 206 WRC at the 2003 Swedish Rally

Personal information
- Nationality: (Finland) Finnish
- Born: 21 May 1975 (age 51); Padasjoki, Finland

World Rally Championship record
- Years active: 1996 – 2005
- Co-driver: (Finland) Esko Mertsalmi (Finland) Risto Mannisenmäki (Finland) Mika Ovaskainen
- Teams: Bozian, Kronos, OMV World Rally Team
- Rallies: 25
- Championships: 0
- Rally wins: 0
- Podiums: 0
- Stage wins: 0
- Total points: 1
- First rally: 1996 Rally Finland
- Last rally: 2005 Rally d'Italia Sardegna

Juuso Pykälistö (born 21 May 1975) is a Finnish rally driver, born in Padasjoki. He has driven in the World Rally Championship with Citroën and Peugeot. Pykälistö has won the Arctic Rally twice. His best showing was 8th in 2005 at Sardinia. From 2004 through 2006, Pykälistö was a test driver for Citroën, testing the new Citroën C4 WRC on gravel. As of 2020, Pykälistö is a medical helicopter pilot at Tampere–Pirkkala Airport. He lives in Nurmijärvi.

== Complete WRC results ==
Year	Entrant	Car	1	2	3	4	5	6	7	8	9	10	11	12	13	14	15	16	WDC	Points
1996	Juuso Pykälistö	Opel Astra GSi 16V	SWE	KEN	IDN	GRC	ARG	FIN; Ret	AUS	ITA	ESP								-	0
1997	Juuso Pykälistö	Mitsubishi Lancer Evo IV	MON	SWE	KEN	POR	ESP	FRA	ARG	GRC	NZL	FIN; Ret	IDN	ITA	AUS	GBR			-	0
1998	Mitsubishi Ralliart Finland	Mitsubishi Carisma GT Evo IV	MON	SWE; Ret	KEN	POR	ESP	FRA	ARG	GRC	NZL	FIN; Ret	ITA	AUS	GBR; Ret				-	0
1999	Mitsubishi Ralliart Finland	Mitsubishi Carisma GT Evo IV	MON	SWE; Ret	KEN	POR	ESP	FRA	ARG	GRC	NZL								-	0
1999	Mitsubishi Ralliart Finland	Mitsubishi Carisma GT Evo IV										FIN; Ret	CHN	ITA	AUS	GBR			-	0
2000	Mitsubishi Ralliart Finland	Mitsubishi Carisma GT Evo VI	MON	SWE; 17	KEN	POR	ESP	ARG	GRC	NZL	FIN; 18	CYP	FRA	ITA	AUS	GBR			-	0
2001	Juuso Pykälistö	Toyota Corolla WRC	MON	SWE	POR	ESP	ARG	CYP	GRC	KEN	FIN; Ret	NZL	ITA	FRA	AUS	GBR			-	0
2002	Juuso Pykälistö	Toyota Corolla WRC	MON	SWE; 11	FRA	ESP	CYP; Ret	ARG	GRC	KEN									-	0
2002	Juuso Pykälistö	Peugeot 206 WRC									FIN; Ret	GER	ITA			GBR; Ret			-	0
2002	Juuso Pykälistö	Mitsubishi Lancer Evo VI												NZL; 26	AUS; Ret				-	0
2003	Juuso Pykälistö	Peugeot 206 WRC	MON	SWE; Ret															-	0
2003	Bozian Racing	Peugeot 206 WRC			TUR; 11	NZL	ARG	GRC; Ret	CYP; Ret	GER	FIN; 9	AUS	ITA	FRA	ESP	GBR; 9			-	0
2004	Kronos Racing	Citroën Xsara WRC	MON	SWE	MEX	NZL	CYP	GRC	TUR	ARG	FIN; Ret	GER	JPN	GBR	ITA; Ret	FRA	ESP	AUS	-	0
2005	OMV World Rally Team	Citroën Xsara WRC	MON	SWE	MEX	NZL	ITA; 8	CYP	TUR	GRC	ARG	FIN	GER	GBR	JPN	FRA	ESP	AUS	27th	1
