= Tapio Laukkanen =

Finnish rally driver (born 1969)

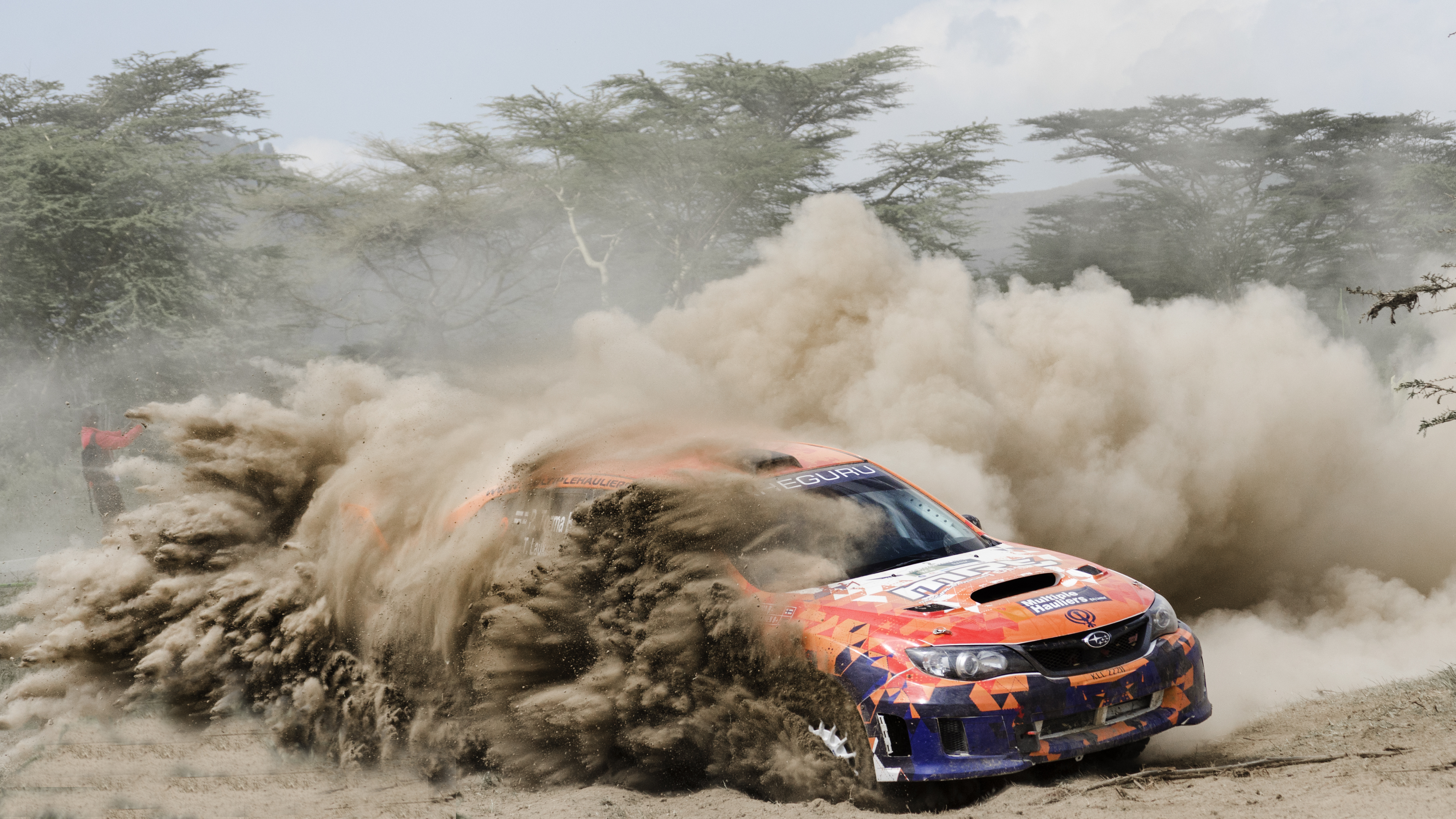
- Laukkanen competing in 2016

Personal information
- Nationality: (Finland) Finnish
- Born: September 23, 1969 (age 57); Lahti, Finland

World Rally Championship record
- Years active: 1994–2001, 2003
- Co-driver: (Finland) Jorma Kaikkonen (Finland) Risto Mannisenmäki (Finland) Tapio Järvi (Finland) Kaj Lindström (Finland) Harri Kaapro
- Teams: S.B.G. Sport; Blue Rose Team; Renault Dealer Rallying UK; Ford Motor Co. Ltd
- Rallies: 22
- Championships: 0
- Rally wins: 0
- Podiums: 0
- Stage wins: 0
- Total points: 2
- First rally: 1994 1000 Lakes Rally
- Last rally: 2003 Wales Rally GB

Tapio Laukkanen (born 23 September 1969) is a retired Finnish rally driver. He was born in Lahti.

In 1996 he won the Finnish Rally Championship in a Volkswagen Golf GTi, in 1999 he won the British Rally Championship with a Renault Mégane Maxi twinned with fellow Finn, Kaj Lindström and in 2016 he won the Kenyan National Rally Championship in a Subaru Impreza.

In 2017 he won Kenya's Safari Rally.

Other co-drivers include Jorma Kaikkonen, Risto Mannisenmäki, Tapio Järvi, Ilkka Riipinen and Rory Kennedy, Gavin Lawrence.

Laukkanen has retired from professional rally races, and now teaches rally drivers at a school bearing his name.

== Racing record ==
=== Complete WRC results ===
| Year | Entrant | Car | 1 | 2 | 3 | 4 | 5 | 6 | 7 | 8 | 9 | 10 | 11 | 12 | 13 | 14 | Pos | Pts |
|---|---|---|---|---|---|---|---|---|---|---|---|---|---|---|---|---|---|---|
| 1994 | Tapio Laukkanen | Mitsubishi Galant VR-4 | MON | POR | KEN | FRA | GRE | ARG | NZL | FIN; Ret | ITA | GBR | | | | | NC | 0 |
| 1995 | S.B.G. Sport | Volkswagen Golf GTI 16v | MON | SWE | POR | FRA | NZL | AUS | ESP | GBR; 12 | | | | | | | NC | 0 |
| 1996 | Blue Rose Team | Volkswagen Golf GTI 16v | SWE | KEN | IDN | GRE | ARG | FIN; Ret | AUS | ITA | ESP | | | | | | NC | 0 |
| 1997 | Blue Rose Team | Volkswagen Golf Kit Car | MON | SWE; 19 | KEN | POR | ESP | FRA | ARG | GRE | NZL | FIN; 11 | IDN | ITA | AUS | GBR | NC | 0 |
| 1998 | Renault Dealer Rallying UK | Renault Mégane Maxi | MON | SWE | KEN | POR | ESP | FRA; 18 | ARG | GRE | NZL | FIN; Ret | ITA; 23 | AUS | GBR; 12 | | NC | 0 |
| 1999 | Renault Elf Dealer Rallying | Renault Mégane Maxi | MON | SWE | KEN | POR; Ret | ESP | FRA; 10 | ARG | GRE | NZL | FIN; 13 | CHN | ITA; Ret | AUS; 19 | GBR; Ret | NC | 0 |
| 2000 | Ford Motor Company Ltd | Ford Focus RS WRC 00 | MON | SWE | KEN | POR | ESP | ARG | GRE | NZL | FIN; Ret | CYP | FRA | ITA | AUS; 5 | GBR; Ret | 20th | 2 |
| 2001 | Tapio Laukkanen | Toyota Corolla WRC | MON | SWE; Ret | POR; 9 | ESP | ARG | CYP | GRE | KEN | | | | | | | NC | 0 |
| 2001 | Tapio Laukkanen | Volkswagen Golf GTI 16v | | | | | | | | | FIN; 23 | NZL | ITA | FRA | AUS | GBR | NC | 0 |
| 2003 | Tapio Laukkanen | Subaru Impreza WRC 2001 | MON | SWE | TUR | NZL | ARG | GRE | CYP | GER | FIN | AUS | ITA | FRA | ESP | GBR; Ret | NC | 0 |

Awards and achievements
| Preceded by Martin Rowe | Autosport; National Rally Driver of the Year; 1999 | Succeeded by Mark Higgins |
