= Thomas Rådström =

Swedish rally driver (born 1966)

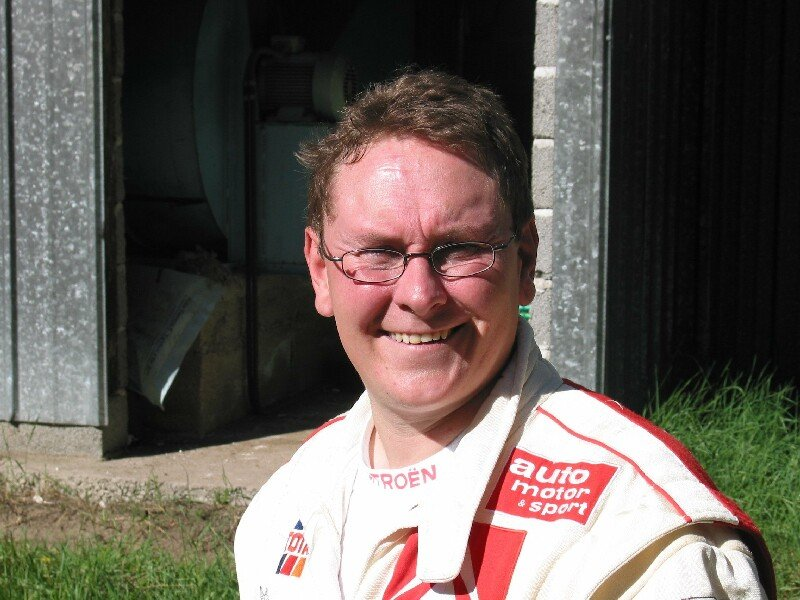
- Rådström during Citroën's testing in Finland in 2002.

Personal information
- Nationality: (Sweden) Swedish
- Born: 22 January 1966 (age 60); Umeå

World Rally Championship record
- Years active: 1989 – 2002, 2006
- Co-driver: (Sweden) Gunnar Stalgren (Sweden) Jörgen Skallman (Sweden) Andres Dawidson (Sweden) Lars Bäckman (France) Denis Giraudet (Sweden) Gunnar Barth (United Kingdom) Fred Gallagher (Sweden) Tina Thörner
- Teams: Toyota, Ford, Mitsubishi, Citroën
- Rallies: 39
- Championships: 0
- Rally wins: 0
- Podiums: 4
- Stage wins: 26
- Total points: 56
- First rally: 1989 Swedish Rally
- Last rally: 2006 Swedish Rally

Thomas Rådström (born 22 January 1966), nicknamed "Rådis", is a rally and rallycross driver from Sweden.

== Career ==
Rådström was one of the leading drivers of the National Swedish Rallycross Championship series during the second half of the 1980s. He then started rallying and competed in the World Rally Championship for nine consecutive years during 1994–2002, and returned in 2006.

Rådström won the Swedish Rally Championship in 1996, and his most significant international successes have been in his home event, the Swedish Rally, which he won in 1994 when the event was not part of the WRC schedule. This was the first of four podiums and seven top-ten finishes in nine attempts at this event.

Rådström was a Toyota works driver from 1991–98, before switching to Ford for a season, competing as the team's star signing Colin McRae's gravel and snow event wingman in the debut season of the Ford Focus WRC. He returned to Toyota in 2000, and from 2001–02 was employed by the then Championship newcomers, Citroën, with the exception of one outing in the Group A Lancer Evolution for Mitsubishi Ralliart at the 2001 Swedish Rally, where he finished second. He scored another podium, now aboard the Xsara WRC, in 2002: a third place on the gruelling Safari Rally, on his team's first visit to the event.

Between 2003 and 2007, Rådström drove a 500+bhp strong Hyundai Accent T16 4x4 in both, the Swedish Rallycross Championship (fourth overall in 2006 as well as in 2007) and in the FIA European Rallycross Championship. His plans to continue driving Rallycross with a Hyundai i30 T16 4x4 were paused due to economical reasons.

== Complete WRC results ==
Year	Entrant	Car	1	2	3	4	5	6	7	8	9	10	11	12	13	14	15	16	WRC	Points
1989	Thomas Rådström	Audi 80 Quattro	SWE; Ret	MON	POR	KEN	FRA	GRE	NZL	ARG	FIN	AUS	ITA	CIV	GBR				-	0
1991	Thomas Rådström	Toyota Celica GT-4	MON	SWE; Ret	POR	KEN	FRA	GRE	NZL	ARG	FIN	AUS	ITA	CIV	ESP	GBR			-	0
1993	Thomas Rådström	Toyota Celica Turbo 4WD	MON	SWE; Ret	POR	KEN	FRA	GRE	ARG	NZL	FIN; Ret	AUS	ITA	ESP	GBR				-	0
1994	Thomas Rådström	Toyota Celica Turbo 4WD	MON	POR	KEN	FRA	GRE	ARG	NZL	FIN; 7	ITA	GBR							31st	4
1995	Toyota Castrol Team	Toyota Celica GT-Four	MON	SWE; 3	POR	FRA	NZL	AUS	ESP	GBR									DSQ	12
1996	Toyota Castrol Team Sweden	Toyota Celica GT-Four	SWE; 6	KEN	IDN						ESP; Ret								15th	12
1996	H.F. Grifone SRL	Toyota Celica GT-Four				GRE; Ret	ARG												15th	12
1996	Toyota Castrol Finland	Toyota Celica GT-Four						FIN; 6	AUS	ITA									15th	12
1997	Toyota Castrol Team Sweden	Toyota Celica GT-Four	MON	SWE; 5	KEN	POR	ESP	FRA	ARG	GRE; 5	NZL	FIN	IDN	ITA	AUS	GBR			15th	4
1998	Toyota Castrol Team	Toyota Corolla WRC	MON	SWE; Ret	KEN														19th	1
1998	Toyota Castrol Team Sweden	Toyota Corolla WRC				POR; Ret	ESP; 12	FRA	ARG	GRE; Ret		FIN; 6	ITA	AUS	GBR				19th	1
1998	H.F. Grifone SRL	Toyota Corolla WRC									NZL; 7								19th	1
1999	Ford Motor Co Ltd	Ford Focus RS WRC '99	MON	SWE; 3	KEN	POR	ESP	FRA	ARG; 6	GRE; Ret	NZL; Ret	FIN; Ret	CHN; Ret	ITA	AUS; 7	GBR; 6			12th	6
2000	Toyota Team Sweden	Toyota Corolla WRC	MON	SWE; 4	KEN														16th	3
2000	Thomas Rådström	Toyota Corolla WRC				POR; Ret	ESP	ARG	GRC	NZL	FIN	CYP	FRA	ITA	AUS	GBR			16th	3
2001	Marlboro Mitsubishi Ralliart	Mitsubishi Lancer Evo 6.5	MON	SWE; 2															15th	6
2001	Thomas Rådström	Citroën Saxo Kit Car			POR; Ret	ESP	ARG	CYP											15th	6
2001	Automobiles Citroën	Citroën Xsara WRC							GRE; Ret	KEN	FIN	NZL	ITA	FRA	AUS	GBR			15th	6
2002	Automobiles Citroën	Citroën Xsara WRC	MON; Ret	SWE; 37	FRA	ESP; Ret	CYP	ARG	GRE; 8	KEN; 3	FIN; Ret	GER	ITA	NZL	AUS	GBR; Ret			12th	4
2006	Rally Team Olsbergs	Subaru Impreza WRC 2004	MON	SWE; 5	MEX	ESP	FRA	ARG	ITA	GRE	GER	FIN	JPN	CYP	TUR	AUS	NZL	GBR	20th	4
