= Gustavo Trelles =

Uruguayan rally driver (born 1955)

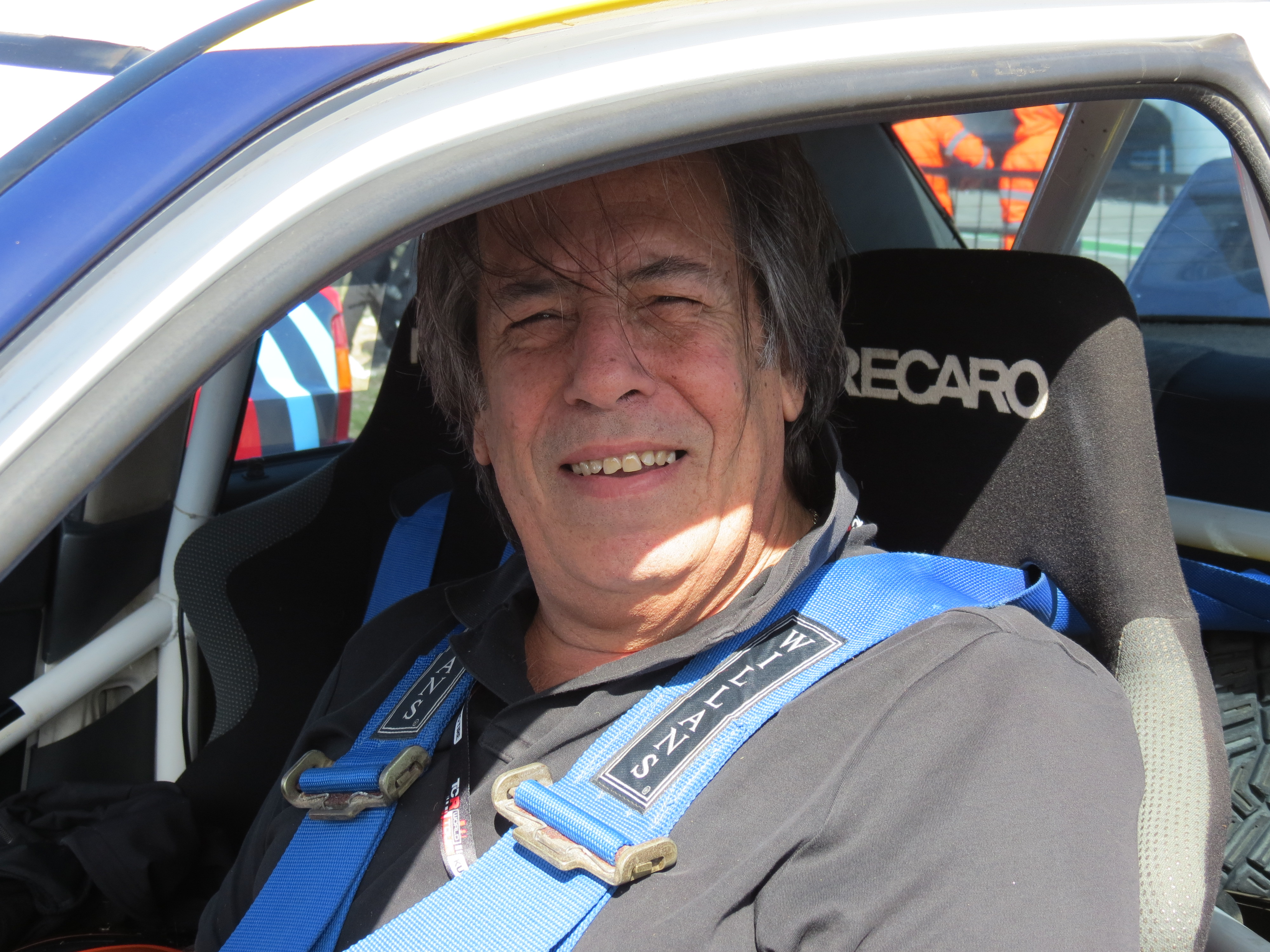
- Gustavo Trelles in 2023

Personal information
- Nationality: (Uruguay) Uruguayan
- Born: November 15, 1955 (age 71); Minas, Uruguay

World Rally Championship record
- Years active: 1981, 1984–1986, 1988–1993, 1995–2002
- Co-driver: (Uruguay) Luís Caulim (Uruguay) Ricardo Ivetich (Uruguay) Daniel Muzio (Italy) Loris Roggia (Uruguay) Pablo Di Bello (Uruguay) Sergio Pronczuk (Argentina) Jorge Del Buono (Argentina) Martin Christie (Uruguay) Artigas Bossi
- Teams: Lancia, Jolly Club, Ralliart
- Rallies: 101
- Championships: 0
- Rally wins: 0
- Podiums: 1
- Stage wins: 2
- Total points: 74
- First rally: 1981 Rallye do Brasil
- Last rally: 2002 Rally Argentina

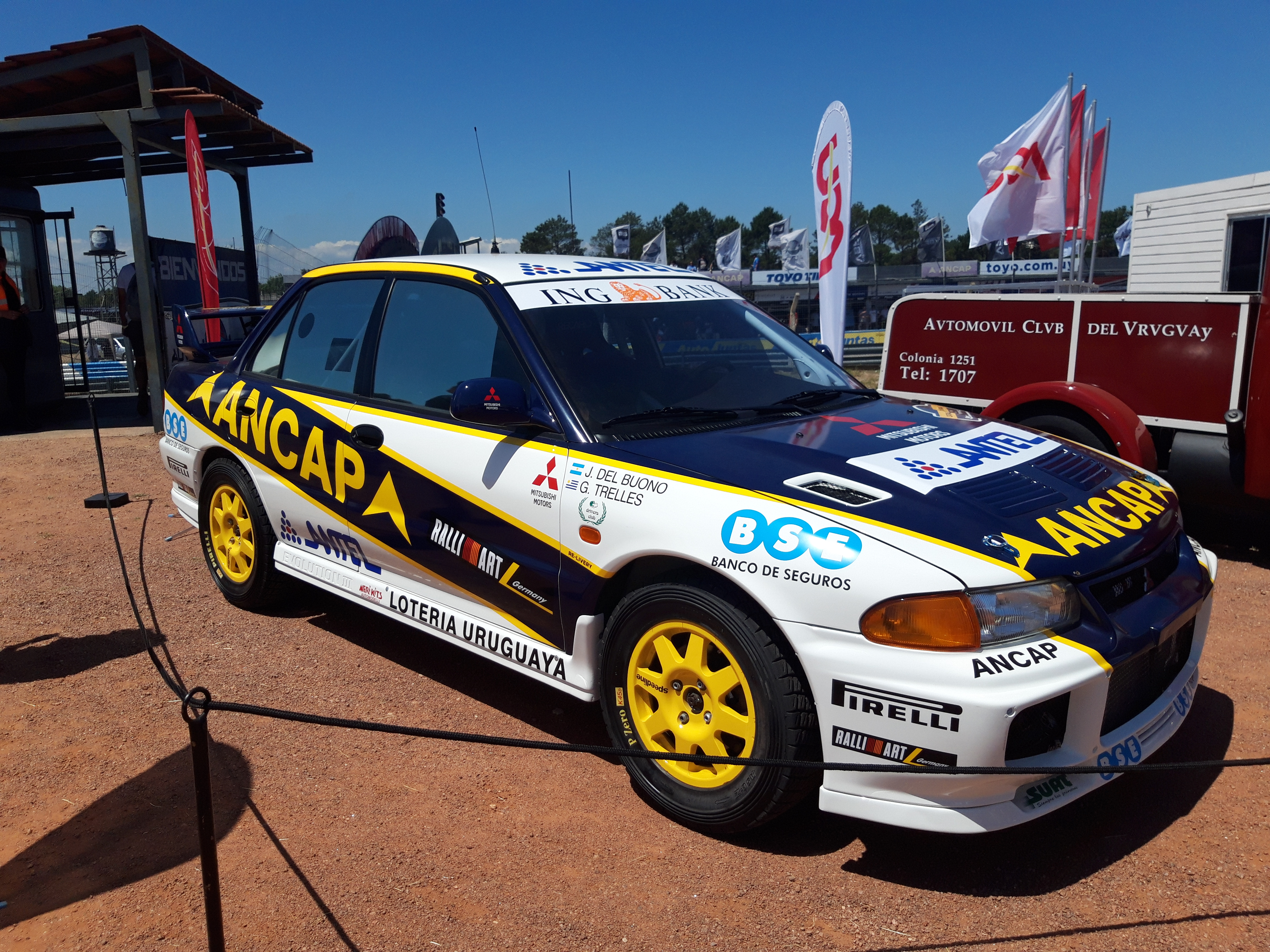
Mitsubishi Lancer Evo III of Gustavo Trelles

Gustavo Trelles (born 15 November 1955 in Minas) is a Uruguayan former rally driver. He competed actively in the World Rally Championship from 1988 to 1993, mainly with a Lancia Delta Integrale, and from 1996 to 2002, mainly with a Mitsubishi Lancer Evolution.

In the WRC, Trelles' best event result was third at the 1992 Rally Argentina with the Delta HF Integrale. His highest placing in the Drivers' World Championship was ninth, during the 1993 season, when he competed with a Delta Integrale for the Jolly Club team, finishing fourth at the Rally Argentina, fifth at the Acropolis Rally, sixth at the Rally Catalunya and seventh at the Rally New Zealand.

In the production car class, Trelles achieved much success with his Lancer Evolution. He won the FIA Group N Cup (now the World Rally Championship-3) title four years in a row from 1996 to 1999, and finished runner-up in 1990, 2000 and 2001.

== WRC results ==
Year	Entrant	Car	1	2	3	4	5	6	7	8	9	10	11	12	13	14	WDC	Pts
1981	Gustavo Trelles	Fiat 147	MON	SWE	POR	KEN	FRA	GRE	ARG	BRA; 6	FIN	ITA	CIV	GBR			33rd	6
1984	Gustavo Trelles	Ford Escort 1600	MON	SWE	POR	KEN	FRA	GRE	NZL	ARG; Ret	FIN	ITA	CIV	GBR			NC	0
1985	Gustavo Trelles	Ford Escort	MON	SWE	POR	KEN	FRA	GRE	NZL	ARG; Ret	FIN	ITA	CIV	GBR			NC	0
1986	Gustavo Trelles	Ford Escort 1600	MON	SWE	POR	KEN	FRA	GRE	NZL	ARG; 11	FIN	CIV	ITA	GBR	USA		NC	0
1988	Gustavo Trelles	Lancia Delta Integrale	MON	SWE	POR; Ret												NC	0
1988	Mazda Rally Team Italia	Mazda 323 4WD				KEN; Ret	FRA	GRE; Ret	USA	NZL				ITA; 17	GBR; Ret		NC	0
1988	Gustavo Trelles	Volkswagen Gol									ARG; Ret	FIN	CIV				NC	0
1989	Gustavo Trelles	Lancia Delta Integrale	SWE; 27	MON	POR; 10	KEN	FRA	GRE; 20	NZL	ARG; 7	FIN; 15	AUS					49th	5
1989	Gustavo Trelles	Lancia Delta Integrale 16V											ITA; Ret				49th	5
1989	Top Run	Lancia Delta Integrale 16V												CIV; Ret			49th	5
1989	Top Run	Lancia Delta Integrale													GBR; Ret		49th	5
1990	Astra Racing	Lancia Delta Integrale 16V	MON	POR; 11	KEN	FRA	GRE; 9	NZL; 7	ARG; Ret	FIN; 15	AUS; 8	ITA; 15	CIV; Ret	GBR; Ret			26th	9
1991	Astra Racing	Lancia Delta Integrale 16V	MON	SWE	POR	KEN	FRA	GRE	NZL	ARG; 8	FIN	AUS	ITA; Ret	CIV			49th	3
1991	Jolly Club	Lancia Delta Integrale 16V													ESP; Ret	GBR	49th	3
1992	Gustavo Trelles	Lancia Delta HF Integrale	MON	SWE	POR	KEN	FRA	GRE	NZL	ARG; 3	FIN	AUS	ITA	CIV			18th	16
1992	Mauro Rallye Team	Lancia Delta HF Integrale													ESP; 7	GBR	18th	16
1993	Jolly Club	Lancia Delta HF Integrale	MON	SWE	POR	KEN	FRA	GRE; 5	ARG; 4	NZL; 7	FIN	AUS	ITA	ESP; 6	GBR		9th	28
1995	Gustavo Trelles	Toyota Celica GT-Four	MON	SWE	POR	FRA	NZL	AUS	ESP; 6	GBR							12th	6
1996	Gustavo Trelles	Subaru Impreza WRX	SWE; Ret	KEN													NC	0
1996	Race-Rent Motorsport	Mitsubishi Lancer Evo III			IDN; Ret	GRE; 15	ARG; 13	FIN; 17	AUS; 17	ITA; 14	ESP; 14						NC	0
1997	Mitsubishi Ralliart Germany	Mitsubishi Lancer Evo III	MON; 9	SWE; 16	KEN	POR; 7	ESP; 13	FRA	ARG; 6	GRE; 13	NZL; 7	FIN; 17	IDN	ITA; Ret	AUS	GBR	26th	1
1998	Uruguay en Carrera	Mitsubishi Lancer Evo IV	MON; Ret	SWE; Ret	KEN	POR; 16			ARG; 9		NZL; 14			AUS; 16	GBR		NC	0
1998	Uruguay en Carrera	Mitsubishi Lancer Evo V					ESP; 20	FRA; 21		GRE; 17		FIN; 16	ITA; 24				NC	0
1999	Ralliart Italia	Mitsubishi Lancer Evo V	MON; 12	SWE; 20	KEN	POR; 15	ESP; 20		ARG; 7		NZL; 9		CHN; 8		AUS; Ret	GBR	NC	0
1999	Ralliart Italia	Mitsubishi Lancer Evo VI						FRA; 20		GRE; Ret		FIN; Ret		ITA; Ret			NC	0
2000	Gustavo Trelles	Mitsubishi Lancer Evo V	MON; 11	SWE	KEN												NC	0
2000	Gustavo Trelles	Mitsubishi Lancer Evo VI				POR; Ret	ESP; 18	ARG; 9	GRE; 12	NZL; 9	FIN; Ret	CYP; 11	FRA; 18	ITA; 24	AUS; 12	GBR; 30	NC	0
2001	Gustavo Trelles	Mitsubishi Lancer Evo VI	MON; 11	SWE	POR; Ret	ESP; Ret	ARG; 11	CYP; 11	GRE; 14	KEN	FIN	NZL	ITA; Ret	FRA; 17	AUS	GBR	NC	0
2002	Gustavo Trelles	Mitsubishi Lancer Evo VI	MON	SWE; Ret													NC	0
2002	Gustavo Trelles	Mitsubishi Lancer Evo VII			FRA; 22	ESP		ARG; 14	GRE	KEN	FIN	GER	ITA	NZL	AUS	GBR	NC	0
2002	MRT	Mitsubishi Lancer Evo VI					CYP; 20										NC	0
