= 1998 World Rally Championship =

26th season of the FIA World Rally Championship

Champions
- World Drivers' Champion: Tommi Mäkinen
- World Manufacturers' Champion: Mitsubishi

Seasons
- ← 1997 1999 →

The 1998 World Rally Championship was the 26th season of the FIA World Rally Championship. The season consisted of 13 rallies. Tommi Mäkinen won his third consecutive drivers' world championship driving for Mitsubishi, ahead of Carlos Sainz and Colin McRae. The manufacturers' title was won by Mitsubishi (who still operated under Group A regulations), ahead of Toyota and Subaru. This year also marked the Ford Escort's last full-season works outing before being replaced by the Ford Focus WRC in 1999. The season ended in dramatic fashion when Carlos Sainz's Corolla WRC stopped approximately 300 metres from the finishing line in the final stage at Margam due to mechanical failure, thus surrendering his fourth place on the rally and handing the title to Mäkinen.

== Calendar ==
The 1998 championship was contested over fourteen rounds in Europe, Africa, South America and Oceania.

Rd.	Start date	Finish date	Rally	Rally headquarters	Surface	Stages	Distance
1	18 January	21 January	(Monaco) 66th Rallye Automobile Monte Carlo	Monte Carlo	Mixed	18	359.19 km
2	6 February	8 February	(Sweden) 47th International Swedish Rally	Karlstad, Värmland County	Snow	19	381.34 km
3	28 February	2 March	46th Safari Rally Kenya	Nairobi	Gravel	16	1063.49 km
4	22 March	25 March	32nd TAP Rallye de Portugal	Matosinhos, Porto	Gravel	28	380.18 km
5	20 April	22 April	(Spain) 34th Rallye Catalunya - Costa Brava - Rallye de España	Lloret de Mar, Catalonia	Tarmac	19	400.71 km
6	4 May	6 May	42nd Tour de Corse - Rallye de France	Ajaccio, Corsica	Tarmac	18	399.18 km
7	20 May	23 May	18th Rally Argentina	Carlos Paz, Córdoba	Gravel	23	400.62 km
8	7 June	9 June	(Greece) 45th Acropolis Rally	Delphi, Phocis	Gravel	17	388.76 km
9	24 July	27 July	29th Rally New Zealand	Manukau, Auckland	Gravel	25	388.39 km
10	21 August	23 August	48th Neste Rally Finland	Jyväskylä, Central Finland	Gravel	24	384.10 km
C	September	September	Rally of Indonesia	Medan, North Sumatra	Gravel	??	???
11	12 October	14 October	(Italy) 40th Rallye Sanremo - Rallye d'Italia	Sanremo, Liguria	Tarmac	24	400.30 km
12	5 November	8 November	11th API Rally Australia	Perth, Western Australia	Gravel	24	404.69 km
13	22 November	24 November	(United Kingdom) 54th Network Q Rally of Great Britain	Cheltenham, Gloucestershire	Gravel	28	383.85 km

== Teams and drivers ==
World Rally Car entries ineligible to score manufacturer points
Manufacturer	Car	Team	Tyre	No.	Drivers	Co-Drivers	Rounds
Mitsubishi	Lancer Evo IV 1-4; Lancer Evo V 5-13	(Japan) Mitsubishi Ralliart	M	1	(Finland) Tommi Mäkinen	(Finland) Risto Mannisenmäki	All
Mitsubishi	Lancer Evo IV 1-4; Lancer Evo V 5-13	(Japan) Mitsubishi Ralliart	M	2	(United Kingdom) Richard Burns	(United Kingdom) Robert Reid	All
Subaru	Impreza WRC97 2 Impreza WRC98 1-13	(Japan) 555 Subaru WRT	P	3	(United Kingdom) Colin McRae	(United Kingdom) Nicky Grist	All
Subaru	Impreza WRC97 2 Impreza WRC98 1-13	(Japan) 555 Subaru WRT	P	4	(Italy) Piero Liatti	(Italy) Fabrizia Pons	1, 3–9, 11–12
Subaru	Impreza WRC97 2 Impreza WRC98 1-13	(Japan) 555 Subaru WRT	P	4	(Sweden) Kenneth Eriksson	(Sweden) Staffan Parmander	2
Subaru	Impreza WRC97 2 Impreza WRC98 1-13	(Japan) 555 Subaru WRT	P	4	(Finland) Jarmo Kytölehto	(Finland) Arto Kapanen	10
Subaru	Impreza WRC97 2 Impreza WRC98 1-13	(Japan) 555 Subaru WRT	P	4	(United Kingdom) Alister McRae	(United Kingdom) David Senior	13
Subaru	Impreza WRC97 2 Impreza WRC98 1-13	(Japan) 555 Subaru WRT	P	10	(Italy) Piero Liatti	(Italy) Fabrizia Pons	2
Subaru	Impreza WRC97 2 Impreza WRC98 1-13	(Japan) 555 Subaru WRT	P	12	(Finland) Ari Vatanen	(Italy) Fabrizia Pons	13
Subaru	Impreza WRC97 2 Impreza WRC98 1-13	(Japan) 555 Subaru WRT	P	15	(Finland) Juha Kangas	(Finland) Pentti Kuukkala	9
Toyota	Corolla WRC	(Japan) Toyota Castrol Team	M	5	(Spain) Carlos Sainz	(Spain) Luis Moya	All
Toyota	Corolla WRC	(Japan) Toyota Castrol Team	M	6	(France) Didier Auriol	(France) Denis Giraudet	1, 3–4, 6–13
Toyota	Corolla WRC	(Japan) Toyota Castrol Team	M	6	(Sweden) Thomas Rådström	(Sweden) Lars Bäckman	2
Toyota	Corolla WRC	(Japan) Toyota Castrol Team	M	6	(Belgium) Freddy Loix	(Belgium) Sven Smeets	5
Toyota	Corolla WRC	(Japan) Toyota Castrol Team	M	9	(France) Didier Auriol	(France) Denis Giraudet	2, 5
Toyota	Corolla WRC	(Japan) Toyota Castrol Team	M	11	(Finland) Marcus Grönholm	(Finland) Timo Rautiainen	13
Ford	Escort WRC	(United States) Ford Motor Co. Ltd.	M	7	(Finland) Juha Kankkunen	(Finland) Juha Repo	All
Ford	Escort WRC	(United States) Ford Motor Co. Ltd.	M	8	(Belgium) Bruno Thiry	(Belgium) Stéphane Prévot	1–2, 5–13
Ford	Escort WRC	(United States) Ford Motor Co. Ltd.	M	8	(Finland) Ari Vatanen	(United Kingdom) Fred Gallagher	3–4
Ford	Escort WRC	(United States) Ford Motor Co. Ltd.	M	11	(Finland) Ari Vatanen	(United Kingdom) Fred Gallagher	10
SEAT	Córdoba WRC	(Spain) SEAT Sport	P	9	(Finland) Harri Rovanperä	(Finland) Risto Pietiläinen	10–13
SEAT	Córdoba WRC	(Spain) SEAT Sport	P	10	(Spain) Oriol Gómez	(Spain) Marc Martí	10
SEAT	Córdoba WRC	(Spain) SEAT Sport	P	10	(Belgium) Marc Duez	(Belgium) Luc Manset	11–12
SEAT	Córdoba WRC	(Spain) SEAT Sport	P	10	(United Kingdom) Gwyndaf Evans	(United Kingdom) Howard Davies	13

World Rally Car entries ineligible to score manufacturer points
Manufacturer	Car	Team	Tyre	Drivers	Co-drivers	Rounds
Toyota	Corolla WRC	Toyota Castrol Team Denmark	M	(Denmark) Henrik Lundgaard	(Denmark) Henrik Vestergaard	13
Toyota	Corolla WRC	Marlboro Toyota Castrol Belgium	M	(Belgium) Freddy Loix	(Belgium) Toomas Kitsing	4–5, 8, 12
Toyota	Corolla WRC	(Portugal) Telecel Castrol Team	M	(Portugal) Pedro Chaves	(Portugal) Sérgio Paiva	4
Toyota	Corolla WRC	Toyota Castrol Team Germany	P	(Germany) Isolde Holderied	(France) Anne-Chantal Pauwels	12
Toyota	Corolla WRC	(Greece) Toyota Hellas	M	(Greece) Angelos Zivas	(Greece) Stelios Fakalis	8
Toyota	Corolla WRC	(Japan) Tein Sport	M	(Japan) Yoshio Fujimoto	(New Zealand) Tony Sircombe	9, 12
Toyota	Corolla WRC	Toyota Castrol Finland	M	(Finland) Marcus Grönholm	(Finland) Timo Rautiainen	10
Toyota	Corolla WRC	(Italy) H.F. Grifone SRL	M	(Finland) Marcus Grönholm	(Finland) Timo Rautiainen	2, 4–5, 9
Toyota	Corolla WRC	(Italy) H.F. Grifone SRL	M	(Portugal) Rui Madeira	(Portugal) Nuno Rodrigues da Silva	5, 8, 10–11
Toyota	Corolla WRC	(Italy) H.F. Grifone SRL	P	(Germany) Isolde Holderied	(France) Anne-Chantal Pauwels	6, 8
Toyota	Corolla WRC	(Italy) H.F. Grifone SRL	M	(Sweden) Thomas Rådström	(Sweden) Lars Bäckman	9
Toyota	Corolla WRC	(Italy) H.F. Grifone SRL	M	(Italy) Andrea Aghini	(Italy) Loris Roggia	11
Toyota	Corolla WRC	(Italy) H.F. Grifone SRL	M	(Hungary) János jun. Tóth	(Hungary) Ferenc Gergely	11
Toyota	Corolla WRC	Toyota Castrol Team Sweden	M	(Sweden) Thomas Rådström	(Sweden) Lars Bäckman	2, 4
Toyota	Corolla WRC	Toyota Castrol Team Sweden	M	(Sweden) Thomas Rådström	(Sweden) Gunnar Barth	5, 7, 10
Toyota	Corolla WRC	Toyota Castrol Team Sweden	M	(Australia) Neal Bates	(Australia) Coral Taylor	12
Subaru	Impreza WRC97	(Germany) Subaru Rallye Team Deutschland	P	(Germany) Armin Kremer	(Germany) Klaus Wicha	1
Subaru	Impreza WRC97	(Italy) A.R.T Engineering	P	(Italy) Andrea Dallavilla	(Italy) Danilo Fappani	4–5, 11
Subaru	Impreza WRC97	(Belgium) Belgacom Turbo Team	P	(Belgium) Grégoire de Mevius	(Belgium) Jean-Marc Fortin	4, 11, 13
Subaru	Impreza WRC97	(Belgium) Ecurie Le Perron	M	(Belgium) Renaud Verreydt	(Belgium) Jean-François Elst	5, 11
Subaru	Impreza WRC97	(Japan) Subaru Allstars Endless Sport	P	(Japan) Yukihiko Sakurai	(Republic of Ireland) Ronan Morgan	8, 13
Subaru	Impreza WRC97	(France) F.Dor Rally Team	M	(France) Frédéric Dor	(United Kingdom) Kevin Gormley	3, 7, 9
Subaru	Impreza WRC97	(France) F.Dor Rally Team	M	(France) Frédéric Dor	(France) Didier Breton	4, 8, 10, 13
Subaru	Impreza WRC97	(Poland) Mobil 1 Stomil Olsztyn	M	(Poland) Krzysztof Hołowczyc	(Belgium) Jean-Marc Fortin	4–5, 7, 11, 13
Ford	Escort WRC	(Belgium) Bastos Ford Rally Team	P	(Belgium) Patrick Snijers	(Belgium) Danny De Canck	10, 14
Ford	Escort WRC	(Greece) Leonídas Kirkos	M	(Greece) Leonídas Kirkos	(Greece) Ioánnis Stavropoulos	8
Ford	Escort WRC	(Greece) Ioannis Papadimitriou		(Greece) Ioannis Papadimitriou	(Greece) Nikolaos Petropoulos	8
Ford	Escort WRC	Ford Team Finland	M	(Finland) Sebastian Lindholm	(Finland) Timo Hantunen	10
Ford	Escort WRC	(Italy) Jolly Club	P	(Italy) Gianfranco Cunico	(Italy) Luigi Pirollo	11
Ford	Escort WRC	(Italy) Jolly Club	P	(Italy) Angelo Medeghini	(Italy) Barbara Capoferri	11
Ford	Escort WRC	(United Kingdom) R.E.D World Rally Team		(Germany) Armin Schwarz	(Germany) Manfred Hiemer	13
Ford	Escort WRC	(Russia) Gazprom Rally Team	M	(Russia) Aleksandr Nikonenko	(Russia) Viktor Timkovskiy	2, 4–5, 8
Ford	Escort WRC	(Russia) Gazprom Rally Team	M	(Russia) Aleksandr Potapov	(Russia) Yevgeniy Zhivoglazov	9
Ford	Escort WRC	(Russia) Gazprom Rally Team	M	(Russia) Aleksandr Potapov	(Russia) Viktor Timkovskiy	10
Ford	Escort WRC	(Russia) Gazprom Rally Team	M	(Finland) Sebastian Lindholm	(Finland) Jukka Aho	12-13

=== FIA 2-Litre World Rally Cup major Manufacturer Entries ===
Team	Manufacturer	Car	Tyre	Drivers	Co-drivers	Rounds
(France) Peugeot Sport	Peugeot	306 Maxi	M	(France) Gilles Panizzi	(France) Herve Panizzi	1, 5–6, 12
(France) Peugeot Sport	Peugeot	306 Maxi	M	(France) François Delecour	(France) Daniel Grataloup	1, 5–6, 12
(Portugal) Peugeot Esso Silver Team SG	Peugeot	306 Maxi	M	(Portugal) Adruzilo Lopes	(Portugal) Luís Lisboa	1, 4–5
(Switzerland) Scuderia Chicco d'Oro	Peugeot	306 Maxi	M	(Switzerland) Cyril Henny	(Switzerland) Aurore Maëder-Brand	1
(Italy) F.P.F. Sport	Peugeot	306 Maxi	M	(Italy) Renato Travaglia	(Italy) Flavio Zanella	12
(Argentina) Federico Villagra	Peugeot	405 Mi16		(Argentina) Federico Villagra	(Argentina) Javier Villagra	7
(Spain) SEAT Sport	SEAT	Ibiza Kit Car Evo2	P	(Finland) Harri Rovanperä	(Finland) Voitto Silander	1–3
(Spain) SEAT Sport	SEAT	Ibiza Kit Car Evo2	P	(Finland) Harri Rovanperä	(Finland) Risto Pietiläinen	4–5, 7–9
(Spain) SEAT Sport	SEAT	Ibiza Kit Car Evo2	P	(Spain) Oriol Gómez	(Spain) Marc Martí	1–5, 7–8
(Spain) SEAT Sport	SEAT	Ibiza Kit Car Evo2	P	(Belgium) Marc Duez	(Belgium) Luc Manset	4
(Spain) SEAT Sport	SEAT	Ibiza Kit Car Evo2	P	(Spain) Salvador Cañellas	(Spain) Xavier Lorza	5, 10, 12–13
(Spain) SEAT Sport	SEAT	Ibiza Kit Car Evo2	P	(Finland) Toni Gardemeister	(Finland) Paavo Lukander	9–13
(Spain) SEAT Sport	SEAT	Ibiza Kit Car Evo2	P	(United Kingdom) Gwyndaf Evans	(United Kingdom) Howard Davies	10, 12
Seat Dealer Team Sweden	SEAT	Ibiza Kit Car Evo2	M	(Sweden) Jörgen Jonasson	(Sweden) Pecka Svensson	2
Andorra Auto Club	SEAT	Ibiza Kit Car Evo2	M	(Andorra) Ferran Font	(Spain) Joan Sureda	3, 10
(France) Paul Saly	Renault	Clio Williams		(France) Paul Saly	(France) Guy Pujol	1
(Greece) "Dim"	Renault	Clio Williams		(Greece) "Dim"	(Greece) Konstantinos Stefanis	8
Renault Team Sweden	Renault	Mégane Maxi		(Sweden) Jonas Kruse	(Sweden) Bruno Berglund	2, 4, 10
(Portugal) Renault Gest Galp	Renault	Mégane Maxi	M	(Portugal) José Carlos Macedo	(Portugal) Miguel Borges	4
(Portugal) Renault Gest Galp	Renault	Mégane Maxi	M	(Portugal) Pedro Azeredo	(Portugal) Carlos Magalhães	4
(Spain) Renault Sport España	Renault	Mégane Maxi	M	(Spain) Luis Climent	(Spain) José Antonio Muñoz	5
(United Kingdom) Renault Elf Dealer Rallying	Renault	Mégane Maxi	M	(United Kingdom) Martin Rowe	(United Kingdom) Derek Ringer	6, 11, 13
(United Kingdom) Renault Elf Dealer Rallying	Renault	Mégane Maxi	M	(Finland) Tapio Laukkanen	(Finland) Tapio Järvi	6, 10
(United Kingdom) Renault Elf Dealer Rallying	Renault	Mégane Maxi	M	(Finland) Tapio Laukkanen	(Finland) Kaj Lindström	11, 13
(Turkey) Renault Türkiye	Renault	Mégane Maxi	M	(Turkey) Nejat Avci	(Turkey) Erkan Bodur	9, 12
(Italy) Luca Pedersoli	Renault	Mégane Maxi	M	(Italy) Luca Pedersoli	(Italy) Giovanni Bernacchini	11
(Italy) Treviso Rally Team	Renault	Mégane Maxi	M	(Italy) Paolo Andreucci	(Italy) Simona Fedeli	11
(Argentina) Ricardo Bissio	Renault	18 GTX		(Argentina) Ricardo Bissio	(Argentina) Alberto Descotte	7
(Argentina) Hector Guillermo Silva	Renault	18 GTX		(Argentina) Hector Guillermo Silva	(Argentina) Jorge Minoli	7
Volkswagen Motorsport Sweden	Volkswagen	Golf III Kit Car		(Sweden) Harry Joki	(Sweden) Ingemar Karlsson	2
(United Kingdom) S.B.G. Sport	Volkswagen	Golf III Kit Car	P	(United Kingdom) Alister McRae	(United Kingdom) David Senior	2, 7, 10–12
(Austria) Sawfish Racing	Volkswagen	Golf III Kit Car	P	(Austria) Raimund Baumschlager	(Germany) Klaus Wicha	3–4, 13
(Austria) Sawfish Racing	Volkswagen	Golf III Kit Car	P	(Austria) Kris Rosenberger	(Sweden) Per Carlsson	3–4, 7, 9, 12
(Austria) Sawfish Racing	Volkswagen	Golf III Kit Car	P	(Finland) Janne Tuohino	(Finland) Ilkka Riipinen	10
(Finland) Jorma Laakso	Volkswagen	Golf III Kit Car		(Finland) Jorma Laakso	(Finland) Jari Jyrkiäinen	10
(Kenya) Jimmy Wahome	Hyundai	Coupé		(Kenya) Jimmy Wahome	(Kenya) Tom Muriuki	3
(Kenya) Gregory Kibiti	Hyundai	Coupé		(Kenya) Gregory Kibiti	(Kenya) George Mwangi	3
(South Korea) Hyundai Motorsport	Hyundai	Coupé	M	(Sweden) Kenneth Eriksson	(Sweden) Staffan Parmander	4–5, 7–8
(South Korea) Hyundai Motorsport	Hyundai	Coupé Evo 2	M	(Sweden) Kenneth Eriksson	(Sweden) Staffan Parmander	9–13
(South Korea) Hyundai Motorsport	Hyundai	Coupé	M	(Australia) Wayne Bell	(Australia) Iain Stewart	4, 8
(South Korea) Hyundai Motorsport	Hyundai	Coupé Evo 2	M	(Australia) Wayne Bell	(Australia) Iain Stewart	9–13
(South Korea) Hyundai Motorsport	Hyundai	Coupé	M	(United Kingdom) Alister McRae	(United Kingdom) David Senior	5–6
(Australia) Dean Herridge	Hyundai	Coupé	M	(Australia) Dean Herridge	(Australia) Jim Carlton	12

=== FIA 2-Litre World Rally Cup Non Manufacturer Entries ===
Team	Manufacturer	Car	Tyre	Drivers	Co-drivers	Rounds
(Germany) Wolf-Dieter Ihle	Opel	Astra GSi 16V		(Germany) Wolf-Dieter Ihle	(Germany) Reinhard Kessemeier	1, 5
Opel Team Sweden	Opel	Astra GSi 16V		(Sweden) Patric Carlsson	(Sweden) Peter Johansson	2
Opel Team Sweden	Opel	Astra GSi 16V		(Sweden) Per Svan	(Sweden) Johan Olsson	2
Promoracing Finland	Nissan	Sunny GTi		(Finland) Toni Gardemeister	(Finland) Paavo Lukander	2
(United Kingdom) Nissan Motorsports Europe	Nissan	Almera Kit Car	Y	(United Kingdom) Mark Higgins	(United Kingdom) Phil Mills	4, 8, 10–11, 13
(United Kingdom) Nissan Motorsports Europe	Nissan	Almera Kit Car	Y	(Portugal) José Araújo	(Portugal) Octávio Araújo	4
Nissan Motorsports Turkey	Nissan	Almera Kit Car	P	(Turkey) Ercan Kazaz	(Turkey) Cengiz Yıldız	13
(Sweden) Team Åkes Bageri AB	Ford	Escort RS2000	M	(Sweden) Anders Nilsson	(Sweden) Markku Kangas	2
(Spain) Ford España	Ford	Escort Maxi Kit Car	M	(Spain) Daniel Alonso Villarón	(Spain) Salvador Belzunces	5
(Finland) Olli Harkki	Ford	Escort Maxi Kit Car		(Finland) Olli Harkki	(Finland) Kari Mustalahti	10
(United Kingdom) Stuart Egglestone	Ford	Escort Maxi Kit Car		(United Kingdom) Stuart Egglestone	(United Kingdom) Steve Egglestone	13
(United States) Ford Motor Co	Ford	Escort Maxi Kit Car		(United Kingdom) Will Hoy	(United Kingdom) Sean Kelly	13
(Finland) Marko Ipatti	Ford	Escort Maxi Kit Car		(Finland) Marko Ipatti	(Finland) Kari Kajula	13
(France) Citroën Sport	Citroën	Xsara F2	M	(France) Philippe Bugalski	(France) Jean-Paul Chiaroni	5–6, 11
(France) Citroën Sport	Citroën	Xsara F2	M	(Spain) Jesús Puras	(Spain) Marc Martí	5, 11
(France) Citroën Sport	Citroën	Xsara F2	M	(France) Patrick Magaud	(France) Michel Périn	6, 11
(France) Citroën Sport	Citroën	Xsara F2	M	(France) Fabien Doenlen	(France) Jean-Marc Andrié	6
(Czech Republic) Škoda Motorsport	Škoda	Octavia Kit Car	M	(Czech Republic) Pavel Sibera	(Czech Republic) Petr Gross	5–6, 8, 10–11, 13
(Czech Republic) Škoda Motorsport	Škoda	Octavia Kit Car	M	(Italy) Fabio Danti	(Italy) Marcello Olivari	11
(Argentina) Norberto Penelo	Daewoo	Cielo		(Argentina) Norberto Penelo	(Argentina) Gustavo Topalian	7
(Japan) Silverstone Suzuki Sport	Suzuki	Baleno Wagon Kit Car	S	(Japan) Nobuhiro Tajima	(New Zealand) Glenn Macneall	9, 12
(Japan) Yutaka Kuritsuhara	Suzuki	Baleno Wagon Kit Car		(Japan) Yutaka Kuritsuhara	(Japan) Akihiko Takahashi	12
(Russia) Avto VAZ Rally Team	Lada	110		(Russia) Viktor Shkolnyy	(Russia) Sergey Talantsev	10
Daihatsu Australia	Daihatsu	Charade GTi		(Australia) Ross Mackenzie	(Australia) Paul van der Mey	12
Daihatsu Australia	Daihatsu	Charade GTi		(Australia) Rick Bates	(United Kingdom) Jenny Brittan	12
(United Kingdom) Vauxhall Motorsport	Vauxhall	Astra Kit Car	M	(Finland) Jarmo Kytölehto	(Finland) Arto Kapanen	13
(United Kingdom) Vauxhall Motorsport	Vauxhall	Astra Kit Car	M	(United Kingdom) Neil Wearden	(United Kingdom) Trevor Agnew	13
(Malaysia) Proton Motorsport	Proton	Satria Kit Car	M	(Sweden) Mats Andersson	(United Kingdom) Lisa Addy	13
(Malaysia) Proton Motorsport	Proton	Satria Kit Car	M	(United Kingdom) Jenny Davies	(United Kingdom) Claire Mole	13

=== Group N Cup major entries ===
Team	Manufacturer	Car	Tyre	Drivers	Co-drivers	Rounds
Uruguay en Carrera	Mitsubishi	Lancer Evo IV	P	(Uruguay) Gustavo Trelles	(Argentina) Jorge Del Buono	1–2
Uruguay en Carrera	Mitsubishi	Lancer Evo IV	P	(Uruguay) Gustavo Trelles	(Uruguay) Martin Christie	4, 8–9, 12
Uruguay en Carrera	Mitsubishi	Lancer Evo V	P	(Uruguay) Gustavo Trelles	(Uruguay) Martin Christie	5–6, 8, 10–11
Uruguay en Carrera	Mitsubishi	Lancer Evo IV	P	(Uruguay) Gabriel Méndez	(Uruguay) Daniel Muzio	5
Uruguay en Carrera	Mitsubishi	Lancer Evo III	P	(Uruguay) Gabriel Méndez	(Uruguay) Carlos Villete	9, 12
(Austria) Race-Rent Motorsport	Mitsubishi	Lancer Evo III	P	(Austria) Manfred Stohl	(Austria) Peter Müller	1, 3–4, 7–9, 12–13
(Austria) Race-Rent Motorsport	Mitsubishi	Lancer Evo V	P	(Austria) Manfred Stohl	(Austria) Peter Müller	5–6, 11
(Spain) Valencia Terra y Mar	Mitsubishi	Lancer Evo III	P	(Spain) Luis Climent	(Spain) Álex Romaní	1–4
(Spain) Valencia Terra y Mar	Mitsubishi	Lancer Evo IV	M	(Spain) Luis Climent	(Spain) Álex Romaní	6, 10
(France) Pierre-César Baroni	Mitsubishi	Lancer Evo IV		(France) Pierre-César Baroni	(France) Dominique Savignoni	1
(Belgium) Marc Duez	Mitsubishi	Lancer Carisma GT Evo IV	M	(Belgium) Marc Duez	(France) Gilles Thimonier	1
(France) Philippe Rognoni	Mitsubishi	Lancer Carisma GT Evo IV	M	(France) Philippe Rognoni	(France) Etienne Patrone	1, 6
(Poland) Sony Power Horse	Mitsubishi	Lancer Evo IV	M	(Poland) Leszek Kuzaj	(Poland) Maciej Baran	1
(Poland) Sony Power Horse	Mitsubishi	Lancer Evo III	M	(Poland) Leszek Kuzaj	(Poland) Krzysztof Gęborys	4–5
(Poland) Sony Power Horse	Mitsubishi	Lancer Evo III	M	(Poland) Leszek Kuzaj	(Poland) Krzysztof Gęborys	3, 7
(Poland) Sony Power Horse	Mitsubishi	Lancer Evo V	M	(Poland) Leszek Kuzaj	(Poland) Andrzej Górski	10–11
Mitsubishi Ralliart Sweden	Mitsubishi	Lancer Evo IV	M	(Sweden) Kenneth Bäcklund	(Sweden) Tord Andersson	2
Mitsubishi Ralliart Sweden	Mitsubishi	Lancer Evo IV	M	(Sweden) Stig-Olov Walfridsson	(Sweden) Gunnar Barth	2
Mitsubishi Ralliart Finland	Mitsubishi	Lancer Carisma GT Evo IV	M	(Finland) Juha Kangas	(Finland) Jani Laaksonen	2, 10
Mitsubishi Ralliart Finland	Mitsubishi	Lancer Carisma GT Evo IV	M	(Finland) Juuso Pykälistö	(Finland) Esko Mertsalmi	2, 10, 14
Mitsubishi Ralliart Finland	Mitsubishi	Lancer Carisma GT Evo IV	M	(Finland) Jouko Puhakka	(Finland) Mika Ovaskainen	10
(Sweden) KNA Oslo	Mitsubishi	Lancer Evo IV		(Sweden) Johan Kressner	(Sweden) Urban Karlsson	2
(Sweden) Bilsport Magazine	Mitsubishi	Lancer Evo III		(Sweden) Gert Blomqvist	(Sweden) Lena Lindberg	2
(Sweden) Per Johansson	Mitsubishi	Lancer Evo IV		(Sweden) Per Johansson	(Sweden) Tony Carlsson	2
(Sweden) Helmia Motorsport	Mitsubishi	Lancer Evo IV		(Sweden) Pernilla Solberg	(Sweden) Ulrika Mattsson	2, 10, 13
(Portugal) Miguel Campos	Mitsubishi	Lancer Carisma GT Evo IV		(Portugal) Miguel Campos	(Portugal) Carlos Magalhães	4
Team Mitsubishi Oman	Mitsubishi	Lancer Evo IV	P	(Oman) Hamed Al-Wahaibi	(United Kingdom) Terry Harryman	4, 7–9, 12–13
Mitsubishi Ralliart Germany	Mitsubishi	Lancer Carisma GT Evo IV	M	(Germany) Uwe Nittel	(Sweden) Christina Thörner	8
Mitsubishi Ralliart Germany	Mitsubishi	Lancer Carisma GT Evo V	M	(Germany) Uwe Nittel	(Sweden) Christina Thörner	10
(France) Jean-Marie Santoni	Mitsubishi	Lancer Evo V	M	(France) Jean-Marie Santoni	(France) Jean-Marc Casamatta	6
(France) Laurent Albertini	Mitsubishi	Lancer Evo IV		(France) Laurent Albertini	(France) Francis Olari	6
(France) Fabien Véricel	Mitsubishi	Lancer Carisma GT Evo IV	M	(France) Fabien Véricel	(France) Vincent Ducher	6
(France) Jacques Andreani	Mitsubishi	Lancer Carisma GT Evo IV		(France) Jacques Andreani	(France) Christophe Gilot	6
(Argentina) José Bravo	Mitsubishi	Lancer Evo III		(Argentina) José Bravo	(Argentina) Mario Vazquez	7
(Argentina) Pablo Gaviña	Mitsubishi	Lancer Evo III		(Argentina) Pablo Gaviña	(Argentina) Adriana Iriart Urrut	7
(Argentina) Marcelo Recanate	Mitsubishi	Lancer Evo III		(Argentina) Marcelo Recanate	(Argentina) Jorge Gonzalez	7
(Argentina) Jorge Recalde	Mitsubishi	Lancer Evo V		(Argentina) Jorge Recalde	(Argentina) Jorge Del Buono	7, 12
(Greece) Dimitris Nassoulas	Mitsubishi	Lancer Evo III		(Greece) Dimitris Nassoulas	(Greece) Leonidas Mahaeras	8
(New Zealand) Ross Meekings	Mitsubishi	Lancer Evo III		(New Zealand) Ross Meekings	(New Zealand) Alan Glen	9, 12
Shell Norway Motorsport	Mitsubishi	Lancer Evo IV		(Norway) Tom J. Myrvang	(Norway) Lasse Olsen	10
(Italy) Treviso Rally Team	Mitsubishi	Lancer Evo V		(Italy) Marco Tempestini	(Italy) Massimo Sghedoni	10
(Italy) Ralliart Italia	Mitsubishi	Lancer Carisma GT Evo V	M	(Italy) Gianluigi Galli	(Italy) Guido D'Amore	11
(Italy) Ralliart Italia	Mitsubishi	Lancer Carisma GT Evo V	M	(Italy) Mario Stagni	(Italy) Roberto Paganoni	11
(Italy) Ralliart Italia	Mitsubishi	Lancer Evo V	M	(Italy) Riccardo Accornero	(Italy) Fabio Tallini	11
(Italy) Ettore Baita	Mitsubishi	Lancer Evo V		(Italy) Ettore Baita	(Italy) Fabio Donini	11
(United Kingdom) Vince Wetton	Mitsubishi	Lancer Evo IV		(United Kingdom) Vince Wetton	(United Kingdom) Joff Haigh	13
(Japan) Mitsubishi Ralliart	Mitsubishi	Lancer Carisma GT Evo V	M	(Germany) Uwe Nittel	(Sweden) Christina Thörner	1–2, 4–5
(Japan) Advan-Piaa Rally Team	Mitsubishi	Lancer Evo III	Y	(Japan) Yoshihiro Kataoka	(Japan) Satoshi Hayashi	9, 12
Ralliart Australia	Mitsubishi	Lancer Evo III	Y	(Australia) Ed Ordynski	(Australia) Mark Stacey	9, 12
Mitsubishi Ralliart New Zealand	Mitsubishi	Lancer Evo IV		(New Zealand) Geoff Argyle	(New Zealand) Raymond Bennett	9
Mitsubishi Ralliart New Zealand	Mitsubishi	Lancer Evo IV		(New Zealand) Lewis Scott	(New Zealand) Jane Black	9
(France) Bruno Marcon	Ford	Escort RS Cosworth		(France) Bruno Marcon	(Monaco) Jean-François Cavarero	1
(Kenya) Chitranjan Patel	Ford	Escort RS Cosworth		(Kenya) Chitranjan Patel	(Kenya) Praful Patel	3
(Sweden) Bo-Be Plastindustri AB	Ford	Escort RS Cosworth	P	(Sweden) Mats Jonsson	(Sweden) Johnny Johansson	2
(Kenya) Paul Bailey	Subaru	Impreza WRX		(Kenya) Paul Bailey	(Kenya) Raju Sehmi	3
(Argentina) Roberto Sanchez	Subaru	Impreza WRX	P	(Argentina) Roberto Sanchez	(Argentina) Edgardo Galindo	4–5, 7
(Argentina) Marcos Ligato	Subaru	Impreza WRX		(Argentina) Marcos Ligato	(Argentina) Rubén García	7
(Greece) Pavlos Moschoutis	Subaru	Impreza WRX		(Greece) Pavlos Moschoutis	(Greece) Manolis Makrinos	8
Subaru Rally Team Australia	Subaru	Impreza WRX		(Australia) Michael Guest	(Australia) David Green	9, 12
Subaru Rally Team Australia	Subaru	Impreza WRX		(Australia) Cody Crocker	(Australia) Greg Foletta	12
Subaru Rally Team Japan	Subaru	Impreza WRX		(Japan) Hideaki Miyoshi	(Australia) Damien Long	9, 12
Subaru Rally Team Japan	Subaru	Impreza WRX		(Japan) Yoshihiro Kataoka	(Japan) Hiroshi Suzuki	9, 12
Subaru Rally Team Japan	Subaru	Impreza WRX		(Japan) Toshihiro Arai	(United Kingdom) Roger Freeman	9, 12–13
(Japan) Yujiro Nishio	Subaru	Impreza WRX		(Japan) Yujiro Nishio	(Japan) Akiko Yamaguchi	12
(United Kingdom) Barretts Motorsport	Subaru	Impreza WRX	M	(United Kingdom) David Higgins	(United Kingdom) Chris Wood	13
(Finland) Juha Kangas	Subaru	Impreza WRX		(Finland) Juha Kangas	(New Zealand) John Kennard	13
(France) Gilles Panizzi	Subaru	Impreza WRX	M	(France) Gilles Panizzi	(France) Hervé Panizzi	13
(Kenya) Azar Anwar	Subaru	Legacy RS		(Kenya) Azar Anwar	(Kenya) Farakh Yusuf	3
(Japan) Takayuki Koseki	Subaru	Forester		(Japan) Takayuki Koseki	(Kenya) Arshad Khan	3
(Italy) Italo Ferrara	Subaru	Impreza 555		(Italy) Italo Ferrara	(Italy) Gabriele Bobbio	11
(Italy) Procar Rally Team	Subaru	Impreza 555	M	(Monaco) Jean-Pierre Richelmi	(France) Thierry Barjou	4
(Italy) Procar Rally Team	Subaru	Impreza 555	M	(Monaco) Jean-Pierre Richelmi	(Monaco) Freddy Delorme	8
(Italy) Procar Rally Team	Subaru	Impreza 555	M	(Italy) Andrea Navarra	(Italy) Renzo Casazza	5, 11
(Italy) Procar Rally Team	Subaru	Impreza 555	M	(Italy) Diego Oldrati	(Italy) Paolo Lizzi	11
Subaru Rally Team Australia	Subaru	Impreza 555	P	(New Zealand) Peter 'Possum' Bourne	(New Zealand) Craig Vincent	9, 12
(Spain) Gamace MC Competición	Peugeot	106 Rallye	M	(Spain) Jordi Grinyó	(Spain) Samira Lanaya	5
(Spain) A.D. Desguaces La Torre	Peugeot	106 Rallye	M	(Spain) Leonardo Sabán	(Spain) Ezequiel Nazábal	5
(Spain) Valencia Terra y Mar	Proton	Wira 4WD	M	(Spain) Luis Climent	(Spain) Álex Romaní	8
(Greece) Anastasios Gemenis	Mazda	323 GT-R		(Greece) Anastasios Gemenis	(Greece) Ioánnis Kepetzis	8
Toyota Castrol Team Denmark	Toyota	Celica GT-Four ST205	M	(Denmark) Henrik Lundgaard	(Denmark) Freddy Pedersen	1
(Finland) Shell Helix Motor Oils	Toyota	Celica GT-Four ST205	M	(Finland) Pasi Hagström	(Finland) Tero Gardemeister	2, 10
(Norway) Shell Norge	Toyota	Celica GT-Four ST205	C	(Norway) Henning Solberg	(Norway) Runar Pedersen	2
(Norway) Shell Norge	Toyota	Celica GT-Four ST205	C	(Norway) Petter Solberg	(Norway) Egil Solstad	2
(Norway) Shell Norge	Toyota	Celica GT-Four ST205	M	(Norway) Petter Solberg	(Norway) Cato Menkerud	13
(Estonia) E.O.S. Team Toyota	Toyota	Celica GT-Four ST205	M	(Estonia) Markko Märtin	(Estonia) Toomas Kitsing	4, 11, 13
(Italy) H.F. Grifone SRL	Toyota	Celica GT-Four ST205	M	(Portugal) Rui Madeira	(Portugal) Nuno Rodrigues da Silva	4
(Italy) H.F. Grifone SRL	Toyota	Celica GT-Four ST205	M	(Estonia) Markko Märtin	(Estonia) Toomas Kitsing	10
Toyota Team Saudi Arabia	Toyota	Celica GT-Four ST205	M	(Saudi Arabia) Abdullah Bakhashab	(Sweden) Arne Hertz	4-5
Toyota Team Saudi Arabia	Toyota	Celica GT-Four ST205	M	(Saudi Arabia) Abdullah Bakhashab	(United Kingdom) Bobby Willis	6, 8, 10–13
Toyota Mobil Team Turkey	Toyota	Celica GT-Four ST205	M	(Turkey) Volkan Isik	(Turkey) Ilham Dökümcü	4–6, 8, 10–13

== Results and standings ==
=== Rally results ===
Rd.	Rally	Overall winners	Group N Cup Winners	Teams cup Winners	2.0 L WC winners	Report
1	(Monaco) Monte Carlo	(Japan) No. 5 Toyota Castrol Team	(Austria) No. 28 Race-Rent Motorsport	No finishers	(France) No. 16 Peugeot Sport	Report
1	(Monaco) Monte Carlo	(Japan) Toyota Corolla WRC	(Japan) Mitsubishi Lancer Evo III	No finishers	(France) Peugeot 306 Maxi	Report
1	(Monaco) Monte Carlo	(Spain) Carlos Sainz (Spain) Luis Moya	(Austria) Manfred Stohl (Austria) Peter Müller	No finishers	(France) Gilles Panizzi (France) Hervé Panizzi	Report
2	Sweden	(Japan) No. 1 Mitsubishi Ralliart	No. 25 Mitsubishi Ralliart Sweden	(Italy) No. 11 H.F. Grifone SRL	No. 27 Seat Dealer Team Sweden	Report
2	Sweden	(Japan) Mitsubishi Lancer Evo IV	(Japan) Mitsubishi Lancer Evo IV	(Japan) Toyota Celica GT-Four (ST205)	(Spain) Seat Ibiza Kit Car Evo2	Report
2	Sweden	(Finland) Tommi Mäkinen (Finland) Risto Mannisenmäki	(Sweden) Stig-Olov Walfridsson (Sweden) Benny Melander	(Finland) Marcus Grönholm (Finland) Timo Rautiainen	(Sweden) Jörgen Jonasson (Sweden) Pecka Svensson	Report
3	Kenya	(Japan) No. 2 Mitsubishi Ralliart	(Spain) No. 18 Valencia Terra y Mar	No finishers	(Spain) No. 11 Seat Sport	Report
3	Kenya	(Japan) Mitsubishi Carisma GT Evo IV	(Japan) Mitsubishi Lancer Evo III	No finishers	(Spain) Seat Ibiza Kit Car Evo2	Report
3	Kenya	(United Kingdom) Richard Burns (United Kingdom) Robert Reid	(Spain) Luis Climent (Spain) Álex Romaní	No finishers	(Finland) Harri Rovanperä (Finland) Voitto Silander	Report
4	Portugal	(Japan) No. 3 555 Subaru WRT	No. 21 Uruguay en Carrera	(Italy) No. 15 H.F. Grifone SRL	(Portugal) No. 19 Peugeot Esso Silver Team SG	Report
4	Portugal	(Japan) Subaru Impreza S5 WRC '98	(Japan) Mitsubishi Lancer Evo IV	(Japan) Toyota Celica GT-Four (ST205)	(France) Peugeot 306 Maxi	Report
4	Portugal	(United Kingdom) Colin McRae (United Kingdom) Nicky Grist	(Uruguay) Gustavo Trelles (Argentina) Martin Christie	(Portugal) Rui Madeira (Portugal) Nuno Rodrigues da Silva	(Portugal) Adruzilo Lopes (Portugal) Luís Lisboa	Report
5	Spain	(Japan) No. 9 Toyota Castrol Team	No. 30 Uruguay en Carrera	(Italy) No. 14 H.F. Grifone SRL	(France) No. 15 Peugeot Sport	Report
5	Spain	(Japan) Toyota Corolla WRC	(Japan) Mitsubishi Lancer Evo V	(Japan) Toyota Corolla WRC	(France) Peugeot 306 Maxi	Report
5	Spain	(France) Didier Auriol (France) Denis Giraudet	(Uruguay) Gustavo Trelles (Argentina) Martin Christie	(Portugal) Rui Madeira (Portugal) Nuno Rodrigues da Silva	(France) Gilles Panizzi (France) Hervé Panizzi	Report
6	France	(Japan) No. 3 555 Subaru WRT	(Austria) No. 24 Race-Rent Motorsport	No. 18 Toyota Team Saudi Arabia	(France) No. 14 Peugeot Sport	Report
6	France	(Japan) Subaru Impreza S5 WRC '98	(Japan) Mitsubishi Lancer Evo V	(Japan) Toyota Celica GT-Four (ST205)	(France) Peugeot 306 Maxi	Report
6	France	(United Kingdom) Colin McRae (United Kingdom) Nicky Grist	(Austria) Manfred Stohl (Austria) Peter Müller	(Saudi Arabia) Abdullah Bakhashab (Sweden) Arne Hertz	(France) François Delecour (France) Daniel Grataloup	Report
7	Argentina	(Japan) No. 1 Mitsubishi Ralliart	No. 18 Uruguay en Carrera	(Poland) No. 9 Mobil 1 Stomil Olsztyn	(Spain) No. 16 Seat Sport	Report
7	Argentina	(Japan) Mitsubishi Lancer Evo V	(Japan) Mitsubishi Lancer Evo IV	(Japan) Subaru Impreza S5 WRC '97	(Spain) Seat Ibiza Kit Car Evo2	Report
7	Argentina	(Finland) Tommi Mäkinen (Finland) Risto Mannisenmäki	(Uruguay) Gustavo Trelles (Argentina) Martin Christie	(Poland) Krzysztof Hołowczyc (Poland) Maciej Wisławski	(Spain) Oriol Gómez (Spain) Marc Martí	Report
8	Greece	(Japan) No. 3 555 Subaru WRT	No. 23 Uruguay en Carrera	(Italy) No. 14 H.F. Grifone SRL	(Spain) No. 25 Seat Sport	Report
8	Greece	(Japan) Subaru Impreza S5 WRC '98	(Japan) Mitsubishi Lancer Evo V	(Japan) Toyota Corolla WRC	(Spain) Seat Ibiza Kit Car Evo2	Report
8	Greece	(United Kingdom) Colin McRae (United Kingdom) Nicky Grist	(Uruguay) Gustavo Trelles (Argentina) Martin Christie	(Portugal) Rui Madeira (Portugal) Nuno Rodrigues da Silva	(Finland) Harri Rovanperä (Finland) Risto Pietiläinen	Report
9	New Zealand	(Japan) No. 5 Toyota Castrol Team	No. 36 Subaru Rally Team Australia	(Italy) No. 14 H.F. Grifone SRL	(Spain) No. 19 Seat Sport	Report
9	New Zealand	(Japan) Toyota Corolla WRC	(Japan) Subaru Impreza WRX	(Japan) Toyota Corolla WRC	(Spain) Seat Ibiza Kit Car Evo2	Report
9	New Zealand	(Spain) Carlos Sainz (Spain) Luis Moya	(Australia) Michael Guest (Australia) David Green	(Sweden) Thomas Rådström (Sweden) Lars Bäckman	(Finland) Harri Rovanperä (Finland) Risto Pietiläinen	Report
10	Finland	(Japan) No. 1 Mitsubishi Ralliart	No. 23 Uruguay en Carrera	No. 15 Toyota Mobil Team Sweden	(United Kingdom) No. 25 S.B.G. Sport	Report
10	Finland	(Japan) Mitsubishi Lancer Evo V	(Japan) Mitsubishi Lancer Evo V	(Japan) Toyota Corolla WRC	(Germany) Volkswagen Golf III Kit Car	Report
10	Finland	(Finland) Tommi Mäkinen (Finland) Risto Mannisenmäki	(Uruguay) Gustavo Trelles (Argentina) Martin Christie	(Sweden) Thomas Rådström (Sweden) Gunnar Barth	(United Kingdom) Alister McRae (United Kingdom) David Senior	Report
11	Italy	(Japan) No. 1 Mitsubishi Ralliart	(Italy) No. 58 Ralliart Italia	(Italy) No. 15 H.F. Grifone SRL	(France) No. 14 Peugeot Sport	Report
11	Italy	(Japan) Mitsubishi Lancer Evo V	(Japan) Mitsubishi Carisma GT Evo V	(Japan) Toyota Corolla WRC	(France) Peugeot 306 Maxi	Report
11	Italy	(Finland) Tommi Mäkinen (Finland) Risto Mannisenmäki	(Italy) Gianluigi Galli (Italy) Guido D'Amore	(Italy) Andrea Aghini (Italy) Loris Roggia	(France) Gilles Panizzi (France) Hervé Panizzi	Report
12	Australia	(Japan) No. 1 Mitsubishi Ralliart	No. 36 Subaru Rally Team Australia	(Russia) No. 14 Gazprom Rally Team	(United Kingdom) No. 20 S.B.G. Sport	Report
12	Australia	(Japan) Mitsubishi Lancer Evo V	(Japan) Subaru Impreza WRX	(United States) Ford Escort WRC	(Germany) Volkswagen Golf III Kit Car	Report
12	Australia	(Finland) Tommi Mäkinen (Finland) Risto Mannisenmäki	(Australia) Michael Guest (Australia) David Green	(Finland) Sebastian Lindholm (Finland) Jukka Aho	(United Kingdom) Alister McRae (United Kingdom) David Senior	Report
13	(United Kingdom) Britain	(Japan) No. 2 Mitsubishi Ralliart	(Austria) No. 53 Race-Rent Motorsport	(Russia) No. 24 Gazprom Rally Team	(United Kingdom) No. 25 Renault Dealer Rallying UK	Report
13	(United Kingdom) Britain	(Japan) Mitsubishi Carisma GT Evo V	(Japan) Mitsubishi Lancer Evo V	(United States) Ford Escort WRC	(France) Renault Mégane Maxi	Report
13	(United Kingdom) Britain	(United Kingdom) Richard Burns (United Kingdom) Robert Reid	(Austria) Manfred Stohl (Austria) Peter Müller	(Finland) Sebastian Lindholm (Finland) Jukka Aho	(Finland) Tapio Laukkanen (Finland) Kaj Lindström	Report

=== Drivers' championship ===
Pos.	Driver	MON (Monaco)	SWE (Sweden)	KEN (Kenya)	POR (Portugal)	ESP (Spain)	FRA (France)	ARG (Argentina)	GRE (Greece)	NZL (New Zealand)	FIN (Finland)	ITA (Italy)	AUS (Australia)	GBR (United Kingdom)	Pts
1	(Finland) Tommi Mäkinen	Ret	1	Ret	Ret	3	Ret	1	Ret	3	1	1	1	Ret	58
2	(Spain) Carlos Sainz	1	2	Ret	2	7	8	2	4	1	2	4	2	Ret	56
3	(United Kingdom) Colin McRae	3	Ret	Ret	1	Ret	1	5	1	5	Ret	3	4	Ret	45
4	(Finland) Juha Kankkunen	2	3	2	7	Ret	9	3	3	4	3	Ret	5	2	39
5	(France) Didier Auriol	14	6	4	Ret	1	6	Ret	2	2	4	Ret	3	Ret	34
6	(United Kingdom) Richard Burns	5	15	1	4	4	Ret	4	Ret	9	5	7	Ret	1	33
7	(Italy) Piero Liatti	4	9	Ret	6	Ret	3	6	6	6		2	Ret		17
8	(Belgium) Freddy Loix				3	2			5				6		13
9	(Belgium) Bruno Thiry	6	8			Ret	5	Ret	Ret	Ret	10	6	7	3	8
10	(France) François Delecour	10				8	2					Ret			6
11	(Finland) Ari Vatanen			3	5						Ret			Ret	6
12	(France) Gilles Panizzi	9				6	4				35	5		Ret	6
13	(Sweden) Kenneth Eriksson		4		Ret	21		Ret	Ret	20	Ret	Ret	22	Ret	3
14	(Belgium) Grégoire De Mévius				8							12		4	3
15	(Finland) Harri Rovanperä	11	Ret	5	Ret	Ret		Ret	15	13	11	Ret	11	6	3
16	(Finland) Marcus Grönholm		5		Ret	Ret				Ret	7			Ret	2
17	(France) Philippe Bugalski					5	Ret					Ret			2
18	(Finland) Sebastian Lindholm										Ret		9	5	2
19	(Austria) Raimund Baumschlager			6	Ret									Ret	1
20	(Sweden) Thomas Rådström		Ret		Ret	12			Ret	7	6				1
Pos.	Driver	MON (Monaco)	SWE (Sweden)	KEN (Kenya)	POR (Portugal)	ESP (Spain)	FRA (France)	ARG (Argentina)	GRE (Greece)	NZL (New Zealand)	FIN (Finland)	ITA (Italy)	AUS (Australia)	GBR (United Kingdom)	Pts

Key
Colour	Result
Gold	Winner
Silver	2nd place
Bronze	3rd place
Green	Points finish
Blue	Non-points finish
Blue	Non-classified finish (NC)
Purple	Did not finish (Ret)
Black	Excluded (EX)
Black	Disqualified (DSQ)
White	Did not start (DNS)
White	Cancelled (C)
Blank	Withdrew entry from the event (WD)

=== Co-drivers' championship ===
Pos.	Co-driver	MON (Monaco)	SWE (Sweden)	KEN (Kenya)	POR (Portugal)	ESP (Spain)	FRA (France)	ARG (Argentina)	GRE (Greece)	NZL (New Zealand)	FIN (Finland)	ITA (Italy)	AUS (Australia)	GBR (United Kingdom)	Pts
1	(Finland) Risto Mannisenmäki	Ret	1	Ret	Ret	3	Ret	1	Ret	3	1	1	1	Ret	58
2	(Spain) Luis Moya	1	2	Ret	2	7	8	2	4	1	2	4	2	Ret	56
3	(United Kingdom) Nicky Grist	3	Ret	Ret	1	Ret	1	5	1	5	Ret	3	4	Ret	45
4	(Finland) Juha Repo	2	3	2	7	Ret	9	3	3	4	3	Ret	5	2	39
5	(France) Denis Giraudet	14	6	4	Ret	1	6	Ret	2	2	4	Ret	3	Ret	34
6	(United Kingdom) Robert Reid	5	15	1	4	4	Ret	4	Ret	9	5	7	Ret	1	33
7	(Italy) Fabrizia Pons	4	9	Ret	6	Ret	3	6	6	6		2	Ret	Ret	17
8	(Belgium) Sven Smeets				3	2			5				6		13
9	(Belgium) Stéphane Prévot	6	8			Ret	5	Ret	Ret	Ret	10	6	7	3	8
10	(France) Daniel Grataloup	10				8	2					Ret			6
11	(United Kingdom) Fred Gallagher			3	5						Ret				6
12	(France) Hervé Panizzi	9				6	4				35	5		Ret	6
13	(Sweden) Staffan Parmander		4		Ret	21		Ret	Ret	20	Ret	Ret	22	Ret	3
14	(Belgium) Jean-Marc Fortin				8							12		4	3
15	(Finland) Risto Pietiläinen	11	Ret	5	Ret	Ret		Ret	15	13	11	Ret	11	6	3
16	(Finland) Timo Rautiainen		5		Ret	Ret				Ret	7			Ret	2
17	(France) Jean-Paul Chiaroni					5	Ret					Ret			2
18	(Finland) Jukka Aho										Ret		9	5	2
19	(Germany) Klaus Wicha	8		6	Ret									Ret	1
20	(Sweden) Gunnar Barth		Ret		Ret	12			Ret	7	6				1
Pos.	Co-driver	MON (Monaco)	SWE (Sweden)	KEN (Kenya)	POR (Portugal)	ESP (Spain)	FRA (France)	ARG (Argentina)	GRE (Greece)	NZL (New Zealand)	FIN (Finland)	ITA (Italy)	AUS (Australia)	GBR (United Kingdom)	Pts

=== Manufacturers' championship ===
Pos.	Manufacturer	No.	MON (Monaco)	SWE (Sweden)	KEN (Kenya)	POR (Portugal)	ESP (Spain)	FRA (France)	ARG (Argentina)	GRE (Greece)	NZL (New Zealand)	FIN (Finland)	ITA (Italy)	AUS (Australia)	GBR (United Kingdom)	Points
1	(Japan) Team Mitsubishi Ralliart	1	Ret	1	Ret	Ret	3	Ret	1	Ret	3	1	1	1	Ret	91
1	(Japan) Team Mitsubishi Ralliart	2	5	15	1	4	4	Ret	4	Ret	9	5	7	Ret	1	91
2	(Japan) Toyota Castrol Team	5	1	2	Ret	2	7	8	2	4	1	2	4	2	Ret	85
2	(Japan) Toyota Castrol Team	6	14	Ret	4	Ret	2	6	Ret	2	2	4	Ret	3	Ret	85
3	(Japan) 555 Subaru World Rally Team	3	3	Ret	Ret	1	Ret	1	5	1	5	Ret	3	4	Ret	65
3	(Japan) 555 Subaru World Rally Team	4	4	4	Ret	6	Ret	3	6	6	6	8	2	Ret	Ret	65
4	(United Kingdom) Ford Motor Co	7	2	3	2	7	Ret	9	3	3	4	3	Ret	5	2	53
4	(United Kingdom) Ford Motor Co	8	6	8	3	5	Ret	5	Ret	Ret	Ret	10	6	7	3	53
5	(Spain) SEAT Sport	9										11	Ret	11	6	1
5	(Spain) SEAT Sport	10										Ret	16	Ret	Ret	1
Pos.	Manufacturer	No.	MON (Monaco)	SWE (Sweden)	KEN (Kenya)	POR (Portugal)	ESP (Spain)	FRA (France)	ARG (Argentina)	GRE (Greece)	NZL (New Zealand)	FIN (Finland)	ITA (Italy)	AUS (Australia)	GBR (United Kingdom)	Points

Key
Colour	Result
Gold	Winner
Silver	2nd place
Bronze	3rd place
Green	Points finish
Blue	Non-points finish
Blue	Non-classified finish (NC)
Purple	Did not finish (Ret)
Black	Excluded (EX)
Black	Disqualified (DSQ)
White	Did not start (DNS)
White	Cancelled (C)
Blank	Withdrew entry from the event (WD)

=== FIA Teams' Cup ===
Pos.	Team	Event													Points
Pos.	Team	MON (Monaco)	SWE (Sweden)	KEN (Kenya)	POR (Portugal)	ESP (Spain)	FRA (France)	ARG (Argentina)	GRE (Greece)	NZL (New Zealand)	FIN (Finland)	ITA (Italy)	AUS (Australia)	GBR (United Kingdom)	Points
1	(Italy) H.F. Grifone	0	10	0	10	10	0	0	10	10	7	16	0	0	73
2	Uruguay en Carrera	0	0	0	2	5	4	6	2	8	4	4	4	0	39
3	(Russia) Gazprom Rally Team	0	0	0	4	0	0	0	3	0	0	0	10	10	27
4	(Poland) Mobil 1 Stomil Olsztyn	0	0	0	6	4	0	10	0	0	0	0	0	6	26
5	Toyota Castrol Team Sweden	0	0	0	0	6	0	0	0	0	10	0	6	0	22
6	Toyota Team Saudi Arabia	0	0	0	0	0	10	0	0	0	3	0	3	4	20
7	Toyota Mobil Team Turkey	0	0	0	3	0	6	0	6	0	0	0	2	0	17
8	(France) Frederic Dor	0	0	0	1	0	0	4	4	1	0	0	0	2	12
9	(Oman) Hamed Al-Wahaibi	0	0	0	0	0	0	3	1	3	0	0	0	3	10

=== Group N Cup ===
Pos.	Driver	MON (Monaco)	SWE (Sweden)	KEN (Kenya)	POR (Portugal)	ESP (Spain)	FRA (France)	ARG (Argentina)	GRE (Greece)	NZL (New Zealand)	FIN (Finland)	ITA (Italy)	AUS (Australia)	GBR (United Kingdom)	Pts
1	(Uruguay) Gustavo Trelles	Ret	Ret		1	1	2	1	1	2	1	3	2		94
2	(Austria) Manfred Stohl	1		2	2	2	1	Ret	Ret	3		Ret	4	1	71
3	(Spain) Luís Climent	2	Ret	1	4		Ret		3		2				37
4	(Australia) Michael Guest									1			1		26
5	(Oman) Hamed Al-Wahaibi				6			2	2	5			Ret	3	24
6	(Sweden) Stig-Olov Walfridsson		1												13
6	(Italy) Gianluigi Galli											1			13
8	(Sweden) Kenneth Bäcklund		2												8
8	(Italy) Mario Stagni											2			8
8	(United Kingdom) David Higgins													2	8
8	(Sweden) Pernilla Solberg		8								3			4	8
12	(Finland) Juha Kangas		3								Ret			5	7
13	(Uruguay) Gabriel Méndez					3				7			Ret		5
13	(France) Pierre-César Baroni	3													5
13	(Kenya) Paul Bailey			3											5
13	(Portugal) Miguel Campos				3										5
13	(France) Jean-Marie Santoni						3								5
13	(Argentina) Marcos Ligato							3							5
13	(Argentina) Jorge Recalde							Ret					3		5
13	(Argentina) Roberto Sanchez				5	4		Ret							5
Pos.	Driver	MON (Monaco)	SWE (Sweden)	KEN (Kenya)	POR (Portugal)	ESP (Spain)	FRA (France)	ARG (Argentina)	GRE (Greece)	NZL (New Zealand)	FIN (Finland)	ITA (Italy)	AUS (Australia)	GBR (United Kingdom)	Pts

Key
Colour	Result
Gold	Winner
Silver	2nd place
Bronze	3rd place
Green	Points finish
Blue	Non-points finish
Blue	Non-classified finish (NC)
Purple	Did not finish (Ret)
Black	Excluded (EX)
Black	Disqualified (DSQ)
White	Did not start (DNS)
White	Cancelled (C)
Blank	Withdrew entry from the event (WD)

== Events ==
1998 World Rally Championship event map
Black = Tarmac	Brown = Gravel	Blue = Snow/Ice	Red = Mixed Surface

1998 World Rally Championship schedule and results
Rally Name	Dates run	Podium Drivers (Finishing Time)	Podium Cars
(Monaco) Monte Carlo Rally	19 January–21 January	1. (Spain) Carlos Sainz (4h:28m:00.5s); 2. (Finland) Juha Kankkunen (4h:28m:41.3s); 3. (United Kingdom) Colin McRae (4h:29m:01.5s)	1. Toyota Corolla WRC; 2. Ford Escort WRC; 3. Subaru Impreza WRC 98
(Sweden) Swedish Rally	6 February–8 February	1. (Finland) Tommi Mäkinen (3h:32m:51.6s); 2. (Spain) Carlos Sainz (3h:33m:43.2s); 3. (Finland) Juha Kankkunen (3h:33m:50.4s)	1. Mitsubishi Lancer Evolution IV; 2. Toyota Corolla WRC; 3. Ford Escort WRC
(Kenya) Safari Rally	28 February–2 March	1. (United Kingdom) Richard Burns (8h:57m:34s); 2. (Finland) Juha Kankkunen (9h:07m:01s); 3. (Finland) Ari Vatanen (9h:07m:26s)	1. Mitsubishi Carisma GT Evolution IV; 2. Ford Escort WRC; 3. Ford Escort WRC
Rally Portugal	22 March–25 March	1. (United Kingdom) Colin McRae (4h:20m:58.1s); 2. (Spain) Carlos Sainz (4h:21m:00.2s); 3. (Belgium) Freddy Loix (4h:21m:43.9s)	1. Subaru Impreza WRC 98; 2. Toyota Corolla WRC; 3. Toyota Corolla WRC
(Spain) Rally Catalunya	20 April–22 April	1. (France) Didier Auriol (4h:18m:36.9s); 2. (Belgium) Freddy Loix (4h:19m:30.3s); 3. (Finland) Tommi Mäkinen (4h:19m:46.3s)	1. Toyota Corolla WRC; 2. Toyota Corolla WRC; 3. Mitsubishi Lancer Evolution V
(France) Tour de Corse	4 May–6 May	1. (United Kingdom) Colin McRae (4h:02m:46.9s); 2. (France) François Delecour (4h:03m:14.1s); 3. (Italy) Piero Liatti (4h:03m:16.9s)	1. Subaru Impreza WRC 98; 2. Peugeot 306 Maxi; 3. Subaru Impreza WRC 98
Rally Argentina	20 May–23 May	1. (Finland) Tommi Mäkinen (4h:22m:07.4s); 2. (Spain) Carlos Sainz (4h:22m:34.2s); 3. (Finland) Juha Kankkunen (4h:22m:34.9s)	1. Mitsubishi Lancer Evolution V 2. Toyota Corolla WRC; 3. Ford Escort WRC
(Greece) Acropolis Rally	7 June–9 June	1. (United Kingdom) Colin McRae (4h:26m:31.6s); 2. (France) Didier Auriol (4h:26m:51.6s); 3. (Finland) Juha Kankkunen (4h:27m:15.9s)	1. Subaru Impreza WRC 98; 2. Toyota Corolla WRC; 3. Ford Escort WRC
Rally New Zealand	24 July–27 July	1. (Spain) Carlos Sainz (3h:54m:57.1s); 2. (France) Didier Auriol (3h:55m:01.2s); 3. (Finland) Tommi Mäkinen (3h:56m:40.8s)	1. Toyota Corolla WRC; 2. Toyota Corolla WRC; 3. Mitsubishi Lancer Evolution V
Rally Finland	21 August–23 August	1. (Finland) Tommi Mäkinen (3h:16m:56.1s); 2. (Spain) Carlos Sainz (3h:17m:31.7s); 3. (Finland) Juha Kankkunen (3h:17m:41.3s)	1. Mitsubishi Lancer Evolution V 2. Toyota Corolla WRC; 3. Ford Escort WRC
(Italy) Rally Sanremo	12 October–14 October	1. (Finland) Tommi Mäkinen (4h:34m:34.5s); 2. (Italy) Piero Liatti (4h:34m:50.3s); 3. (United Kingdom) Colin McRae (4h:36m:04.7s)	1. Mitsubishi Lancer Evolution V 2. Subaru Impreza WRC 98; 3. Subaru Impreza WRC 98
Rally Australia	5 November–8 November	1. (Finland) Tommi Mäkinen (3h:52m:48.7s); 2. (Spain) Carlos Sainz (3h:53m:05.2s); 3. (France) Didier Auriol (3h:53m:13.7s)	1. Mitsubishi Lancer Evolution V 2. Toyota Corolla WRC; 3. Toyota Corolla WRC
(United Kingdom) Rally of Great Britain	22 November–24 November	1. (United Kingdom) Richard Burns (3h:50m:30.6s); 2. (Finland) Juha Kankkunen (3h:54m:17.1s); 3. (Belgium) Bruno Thiry (3h:55m:58.1s)	1. Mitsubishi Carisma GT Evolution V 2. Ford Escort WRC; 3. Ford Escort WRC
