= 2000 Cyprus Rally =

10th round of the 2000 World Rally Championship

2000 Cyprus Rally 28th Cyprus Rally
Round 10 of the 2000 World Rally Championship season
← Previous event	Next event →
- Host country: Cyprus
- Rally base: Limassol
- Dates run: September 8 2000 – September 10 2000
- Stages: 23 (348.41 km; 216.49 miles)
- Stage surface: Gravel
- Overall distance: 1,227.79 km (762.91 miles)

Statistics
- Crews: 52 at start, 27 at finish

Overall results
- Overall winner: (Spain) Carlos Sainz (Spain) Luis Moya (United Kingdom) Ford Motor Co. Ltd. Ford Focus RS WRC '00

The 2000 Cyprus Rally (formally the 28th Cyprus Rally) was the tenth round of the 2000 World Rally Championship. The race was held over three days between 8 September and 10 September 2000, and was won by Ford's Carlos Sainz, his 23rd win in the World Rally Championship.

== Background ==
=== Entry list ===
No.	Driver	Co-Driver	Entrant	Car	Tyre
World Rally Championship manufacturer entries
1	(Finland) Tommi Mäkinen	(Finland) Risto Mannisenmäki	(Japan) Marlboro Mitsubishi Ralliart	Mitsubishi Lancer Evo VI	MI
2	(Belgium) Freddy Loix	(Belgium) Sven Smeets	(Japan) Marlboro Mitsubishi Ralliart	Mitsubishi Carisma GT Evo VI	MI
3	(United Kingdom) Richard Burns	(United Kingdom) Robert Reid	(Japan) Subaru World Rally Team	Subaru Impreza S6 WRC '00	P
4	(Finland) Juha Kankkunen	(Finland) Juha Repo	(Japan) Subaru World Rally Team	Subaru Impreza S6 WRC '00	P
5	(United Kingdom) Colin McRae	(United Kingdom) Nicky Grist	(United Kingdom) Ford Motor Co. Ltd.	Ford Focus RS WRC '00	MI
6	(Spain) Carlos Sainz	(Spain) Luis Moya	(United Kingdom) Ford Motor Co. Ltd.	Ford Focus RS WRC '00	MI
7	(France) Didier Auriol	(France) Denis Giraudet	(Spain) SEAT Sport	SEAT Córdoba WRC Evo3	P
8	(Finland) Toni Gardemeister	(Finland) Paavo Lukander	(Spain) SEAT Sport	SEAT Córdoba WRC Evo3	P
9	(France) François Delecour	(France) Daniel Grataloup	(France) Peugeot Esso	Peugeot 206 WRC	MI
10	(Finland) Marcus Grönholm	(Finland) Timo Rautiainen	(France) Peugeot Esso	Peugeot 206 WRC	MI
11	(Germany) Armin Schwarz	(Germany) Manfred Hiemer	(Czech Republic) Škoda Motorsport	Škoda Octavia WRC Evo2	MI
12	(Spain) Luis Climent Asensio	(Spain) Álex Romaní	(Czech Republic) Škoda Motorsport	Škoda Octavia WRC Evo2	MI
World Rally Championship entries
20	(Estonia) Markko Märtin	(United Kingdom) Michael Park	(Estonia) Lukoil EOS Rally Team	Toyota Corolla WRC	—N/a
18	(Japan) Toshihiro Arai	(United Kingdom) Roger Freeman	(Japan) Spike Subaru Team	Subaru Impreza S5 WRC '99	—N/a
19	(Poland) Krzysztof Hołowczyc	(Belgium) Jean-Marc Fortin	(Poland) Wizja TV / Turning Point RT	Subaru Impreza S5 WRC '99	MI
20	(Saudi Arabia) Abdullah Bakhashab	(United Kingdom) Bobby Willis	Toyota Team Saudi Arabia	Toyota Corolla WRC	MI
21	(France) Frédéric Dor	(France) Didier Breton	(France) F. Dor Rally Team	Subaru Impreza S5 WRC '99	—N/a
22	(France) Simon Jean-Joseph	(France) Jack Boyère	(France) Simon Jean-Joseph	Subaru Impreza S5 WRC '98	—N/a
23	(Greece) Ioannis Papadimitriou	(Greece) Nikolaos Petropoulos	(Greece) Ioannis Papadimitriou	Subaru Impreza S5 WRC '99	—N/a
29	(Cyprus) Andreas Tsouloftas	(Cyprus) Andreas Achilleos	(Cyprus) Fairways Rally Team	Mitsubishi Lancer Evo VI	—N/a
30	(Cyprus) Chris Thomas	(Cyprus) Andreas Christodoulides	(Cyprus) Chris Thomas	Mitsubishi Lancer Evo VI	—N/a
33	(Lebanon) Maurice Sehnaoui	(Lebanon) Naji Stephan	(Lebanon) Maurice Sehnaoui	Toyota Corolla WRC	—N/a
34	(Cyprus) Christos Eliades	(Cyprus) Dimis Cacoyiannis	(Cyprus) Christos Eliades	Mitsubishi Lancer Evo III	—N/a
35	(Cyprus) Paraskevas Paraskeva	(Cyprus) Savvas Laos	(Cyprus) Paraskevas Paraskeva	Mitsubishi Lancer Evo V	—N/a
36	(United Kingdom) Nigel Heath	(United Kingdom) Steve Lancaster	(United Kingdom) Nigel Heath	Subaru Impreza WRC	—N/a
37	(Lebanon) Michel Saleh	(Cyprus) Adamos Gregoriou	(Lebanon) Michel Saleh	Toyota Celica GT-Four	—N/a
42	(Cyprus) Iakovos Pendaras	(Cyprus) Andreas Andreou	(Cyprus) Iakovos Pendaras	Mitsubishi Lancer Evolution	—N/a
48	(Cyprus) Leonidas Katsaros	(Cyprus) Renos Thrasyvoulou	(Cyprus) Leonidas Katsaros	Lancia Delta HF Integrale	—N/a
53	(Cyprus) Nicholas Mandrides	(Cyprus) Yiannis Ioannou	(Cyprus) Nicholas Mandrides	Mitsubishi Lancer Evo VI	—N/a
Group N Cup entries
24	(Austria) Manfred Stohl	(Austria) Peter Müller	(Austria) Manfred Stohl	Mitsubishi Lancer Evo VI	P
25	(Uruguay) Gustavo Trelles	(Argentina) Jorge Del Buono	(Uruguay) Gustavo Trelles	Mitsubishi Lancer Evo VI	P
27	(Argentina) Claudio Marcelo Menzi	(Argentina) Edgardo Galindo	(Argentina) Claudio Marcelo Menzi	Mitsubishi Lancer Evo VI	—N/a
28	(Argentina) Gabriel Pozzo	(Argentina) Fabian Cretu	(Argentina) Gabriel Pozzo	Mitsubishi Lancer Evo VI	—N/a
31	(Cyprus) Andreas Peratikos	(Cyprus) Harris Episkopou	(Cyprus) Andreas Peratikos	Mitsubishi Lancer Evo III	—N/a
32	(Cyprus) Dimi Mavropoulos	(Cyprus) Georgios Alexandrou	(Cyprus) Dimi Mavropoulos	Mitsubishi Lancer Evo VI	—N/a
38	(Oman) Nizar Al-Shanfari	(Cyprus) Michalakis Michael	(Oman) Nizar Al-Shanfari	Mitsubishi Lancer Evo VI	—N/a
39	(Australia) Ron Cremen	(Australia) Linda Long	(Australia) Ron Cremen	Mitsubishi Lancer Evo IV	—N/a
40	(Israel) Rami Shohatovich	(Cyprus) Nikitas Stavrinou	(Israel) Rami Shohatovich	Mitsubishi Lancer Evo V	—N/a
44	(Belgium) Bob Colsoul	(Belgium) Tom Colsoul	(Belgium) Bob Colsoul	Mitsubishi Lancer Evo V	—N/a
45	(Cyprus) Prodromos Prodromou	(Cyprus) Yiannos Hadjichristofi	(Cyprus) Prodromos Prodromou	Mitsubishi Lancer Evo III	—N/a
46	(Cyprus) Charalambos Timotheou	(Cyprus) Nicos Panayides	(Cyprus) Charalambos Timotheou	Subaru Impreza 555	—N/a
47	(Cyprus) Panagiotis Theofanides	(Cyprus) Nikos Theofanides	(Cyprus) Panagiotis Theofanides	Subaru Impreza WRX	—N/a
49	(Greece) Pavlos Moschoutis	(Greece) Giorgos Petropoulos	(Greece) Pavlos Moschoutis	Mitsubishi Lancer Evo VI	—N/a
52	(Israel) Johnny Westberg	(Israel) Etai Moldawsky	(Israel) Johnny Westberg	Mitsubishi Lancer Evo VI	—N/a
54	(Israel) Daniel Levy	(Cyprus) Theodoros Georgiou	(Israel) Daniel Levy	Subaru Impreza WRX	—N/a
57	(Cyprus) Demitris Pieri	(Cyprus) Petros Panteli	(Cyprus) Demitris Pieri	Toyota Celica GT-Four	—N/a
58	(Cyprus) Andreas Konstantinou	(Cyprus) Marios Potamou	(Cyprus) Andreas Konstantinou	Subaru Impreza WRX	—N/a
59	(Cyprus) Giorgos Koudounias	(Cyprus) Andreas Erotokritou	(Cyprus) Giorgos Koudounias	Renault Clio 16V	—N/a

=== Itinerary ===
All dates and times are EEST (UTC+3)

Date	Time	No.	Stage name	Distance
Leg 1 — 145.16 km
8 September	08:33	SS1	Alassa 1	6.22 km
8 September	09:06	SS2	Prastio 1	11.06 km
8 September	09:49	SS3	Agios Nikolaos 1	11.30 km
8 September	10:22	SS4	Platres 1	11.99 km
8 September	12:17	SS5	Mylikouri 1	31.87 km
8 September	13:10	SS6	Panagia 1	19.52 km
8 September	15:08	SS7	Kourdali	14.92 km
8 September	15:39	SS8	Assinou	25.39 km
8 September	16:57	SS9	Xerarkaka	12.89 km
Leg 2 — 114.50 km
9 September	09:01	SS10	Platres — Saittas	11.48 km
9 September	09:39	SS11	Alassa 2	6.22 km
9 September	10:12	SS12	Prastio 2	11.06 km
9 September	13:10	SS13	Panagia 2	19.52 km
9 September	13:55	SS14	Mylikouri 2	31.87 km
9 September	16:48	SS15	Prastio 3	11.06 km
9 September	17:31	SS16	Agios Nikolaos 2	11.30 km
9 September	18:04	SS17	Platres 2	11.99 km
Leg 3 — 88.75 km
10 September	09:21	SS18	Vavatsinia 1	19.11 km
10 September	10:04	SS19	Agios Onoufrios	18.10 km
10 September	10:52	SS20	Lageia 1	9.62 km
10 September	13:47	SS21	Vavatsinia 2	19.11 km
10 September	14:35	SS22	Macheras	13.19 km
10 September	15:18	SS23	Lageia 2	9.62 km

== Results ==
=== Overall ===
Pos.	No.	Driver	Co-driver	Team	Car	Time	Difference	Points
1	6	(Spain) Carlos Sainz	(Spain) Luis Moya	(United Kingdom) Ford Motor Co. Ltd.	Ford Focus RS WRC '00	5:26:04.9		10
2	5	(United Kingdom) Colin McRae	(United Kingdom) Nicky Grist	(United Kingdom) Ford Motor Co. Ltd.	Ford Focus RS WRC '00	5:26:42.2	+37.3	6
3	9	(France) François Delecour	(France) Daniel Grataloup	(France) Peugeot Esso	Peugeot 206 WRC	5:27:35.7	+1:30.8	4
4	3	(United Kingdom) Richard Burns	(United Kingdom) Robert Reid	(Japan) Subaru World Rally Team	Subaru Impreza S6 WRC '00	5:28:09.0	+2:04.1	3
5	1	(Finland) Tommi Mäkinen	(Finland) Risto Mannisenmäki	(Japan) Marlboro Mitsubishi Ralliart	Mitsubishi Lancer Evo VI	5:29:03.1	+2:58.2	2
6	20	(Estonia) Markko Märtin	(United Kingdom) Michael Park	(Estonia) Lukoil EOS Rally Team	Toyota Corolla WRC	5:29:50.3	+3:45.4	1

=== World Rally Cars ===
==== Classification ====
Position		No.	Driver	Co-driver	Entrant	Car	Time	Difference	Points
Event	Class	No.	Driver	Co-driver	Entrant	Car	Time	Difference	Points
1	1	6	(Spain) Carlos Sainz	(Spain) Luis Moya	(United Kingdom) Ford Motor Co. Ltd.	Ford Focus RS WRC '00	5:26:04.9		10
2	2	5	(United Kingdom) Colin McRae	(United Kingdom) Nicky Grist	(United Kingdom) Ford Motor Co. Ltd.	Ford Focus RS WRC '00	5:26:42.2	+37.3	6
3	3	9	(France) François Delecour	(France) Daniel Grataloup	(France) Peugeot Esso	Peugeot 206 WRC	5:27:35.7	+1:30.8	4
4	4	3	(United Kingdom) Richard Burns	(United Kingdom) Robert Reid	(Japan) Subaru World Rally Team	Subaru Impreza S6 WRC '00	5:28:09.0	+2:04.1	3
5	5	1	(Finland) Tommi Mäkinen	(Finland) Risto Mannisenmäki	(Japan) Marlboro Mitsubishi Ralliart	Mitsubishi Lancer Evo VI	5:29:03.1	+2:58.2	2
7	6	4	(Finland) Juha Kankkunen	(Finland) Juha Repo	(Japan) Subaru World Rally Team	Subaru Impreza S6 WRC '00	5:33:06.6	+7:01.7	0
8	7	2	(Belgium) Freddy Loix	(Belgium) Sven Smeets	(Japan) Marlboro Mitsubishi Ralliart	Mitsubishi Carisma GT Evo VI	5:34:10.6	+8:05.7	0
Retired SS14		8	(Finland) Toni Gardemeister	(Finland) Paavo Lukander	(Spain) SEAT Sport	SEAT Córdoba WRC Evo3	Accident		0
Retired SS7		7	(France) Didier Auriol	(France) Denis Giraudet	(Spain) SEAT Sport	SEAT Córdoba WRC Evo3	Mechanical		0
Retired SS6		10	(Finland) Marcus Grönholm	(Finland) Timo Rautiainen	(France) Peugeot Esso	Peugeot 206 WRC	Engine		0
Retired SS5		12	(Spain) Luis Climent Asensio	(Spain) Álex Romaní	(Czech Republic) Škoda Motorsport	Škoda Octavia WRC Evo2	Oil leak		0
Retired SS2		11	(Germany) Armin Schwarz	(Germany) Manfred Hiemer	(Czech Republic) Škoda Motorsport	Škoda Octavia WRC Evo2	Accident		0

==== Special stages ====
Day	Stage	Stage name	Length	Winner	Car	Time	Class leaders
Leg 1 (8 Sep)	SS1	Alassa 1	6.22 km	(Spain) Carlos Sainz	Ford Focus RS WRC '00	4:34.7	(Spain) Carlos Sainz
Leg 1 (8 Sep)	SS2	Prastio 1	11.06 km	(United Kingdom) Richard Burns	Subaru Impreza S6 WRC '00	6:40.0	(Spain) Carlos Sainz
Leg 1 (8 Sep)	SS3	Agios Nikolaos 1	11.30 km	(Spain) Carlos Sainz	Ford Focus RS WRC '00	10:04.0	(Spain) Carlos Sainz
Leg 1 (8 Sep)	SS4	Platres 1	11.99 km	(Spain) Carlos Sainz	Ford Focus RS WRC '00	9:54.0	(Spain) Carlos Sainz
Leg 1 (8 Sep)	SS5	Mylikouri 1	31.87 km	(United Kingdom) Richard Burns	Subaru Impreza S6 WRC '00	36:05.6	(Spain) Carlos Sainz
Leg 1 (8 Sep)	SS6	Panagia 1	19.52 km	(Spain) Carlos Sainz	Ford Focus RS WRC '00	17:33.8	(Spain) Carlos Sainz
Leg 1 (8 Sep)	SS7	Kourdali	14.92 km	(Spain) Carlos Sainz	Ford Focus RS WRC '00	16:28.9	(Spain) Carlos Sainz
Leg 1 (8 Sep)	SS8	Assinou	25.39 km	(Spain) Carlos Sainz	Ford Focus RS WRC '00	27:30.8	(Spain) Carlos Sainz
Leg 1 (8 Sep)	SS9	Xerarkaka	12.89 km	(Spain) Carlos Sainz	Ford Focus RS WRC '00	14:33.8	(Spain) Carlos Sainz
Leg 2 (9 Sep)	SS10	Platres — Saittas	11.48 km	(Belgium) Freddy Loix	Mitsubishi Carisma GT Evo VI	9:46.4	(Spain) Carlos Sainz
Leg 2 (9 Sep)	SS11	Alassa 2	6.22 km	(Finland) Tommi Mäkinen	Mitsubishi Lancer Evo VI	4:35.0	(Spain) Carlos Sainz
Leg 2 (9 Sep)	SS12	Prastio 2	11.06 km	(Finland) Juha Kankkunen	Subaru Impreza S6 WRC '00	6:36.8	(Spain) Carlos Sainz
Leg 2 (9 Sep)	SS13	Panagia 2	19.52 km	(Belgium) Freddy Loix	Mitsubishi Carisma GT Evo VI	17:10.9	(Spain) Carlos Sainz
Leg 2 (9 Sep)	SS14	Mylikouri 2	31.87 km	(United Kingdom) Colin McRae	Ford Focus RS WRC '00	35:52.1	(Spain) Carlos Sainz
Leg 2 (9 Sep)	SS15	Prastio 3	11.06 km	(United Kingdom) Richard Burns	Subaru Impreza S6 WRC '00	6:34.6	(Spain) Carlos Sainz
Leg 2 (9 Sep)	SS16	Agios Nikolaos 2	11.30 km	(Finland) Tommi Mäkinen	Mitsubishi Lancer Evo VI	9:57.8	(Spain) Carlos Sainz
Leg 2 (9 Sep)	SS17	Platres 2	11.99 km	(Spain) Carlos Sainz	Ford Focus RS WRC '00	9:45.5	(Spain) Carlos Sainz
Leg 3 (10 Sep)	SS18	Vavatsinia 1	19.11 km	(Finland) Tommi Mäkinen	Mitsubishi Lancer Evo VI	17:05.7	(Spain) Carlos Sainz
Leg 3 (10 Sep)	SS19	Agios Onoufrios	18.10 km	(United Kingdom) Richard Burns	Subaru Impreza S6 WRC '00	16:26.1	(Spain) Carlos Sainz
Leg 3 (10 Sep)	SS20	Lageia 1	9.62 km	(United Kingdom) Richard Burns	Subaru Impreza S6 WRC '00	8:38.6	(Spain) Carlos Sainz
Leg 3 (10 Sep)	SS21	Vavatsinia 2	19.11 km	(Finland) Tommi Mäkinen	Mitsubishi Lancer Evo VI	16:58.3	(Spain) Carlos Sainz
Leg 3 (10 Sep)	SS22	Macheras	13.19 km	(United Kingdom) Richard Burns	Subaru Impreza S6 WRC '00	11:40.0	(Spain) Carlos Sainz
Leg 3 (10 Sep)	SS23	Lageia 2	9.62 km	(United Kingdom) Richard Burns	Subaru Impreza S6 WRC '00	8:35.8	(Spain) Carlos Sainz

==== Championship standings ====
Pos.	Drivers' championships			Co-drivers' championships			Manufacturers' championships		
Pos.	Move	Driver	Points	Move	Co-driver	Points	Move	Manufacturer	Points
1		(Finland) Marcus Grönholm	44		(Finland) Timo Rautiainen	44		(United Kingdom) Ford Motor Co. Ltd.	79
2	1	(United Kingdom) Colin McRae	42	1	(United Kingdom) Nicky Grist	42		(Japan) Subaru World Rally Team	64
3	1	(United Kingdom) Richard Burns	41	1	(United Kingdom) Robert Reid	41		(France) Peugeot Esso	58
4		(Spain) Carlos Sainz	37		(Spain) Luis Moya	37		(Japan) Marlboro Mitsubishi Ralliart	35
5		(Finland) Tommi Mäkinen	28		(Finland) Risto Mannisenmäki	28		(Czech Republic) Škoda Motorsport	8

=== FIA Cup for Production Rally Drivers ===
==== Classification ====
Position		No.	Driver	Co-driver	Entrant	Car	Time	Difference	Points
Event	Class	No.	Driver	Co-driver	Entrant	Car	Time	Difference	Points
11	1	25	(Uruguay) Gustavo Trelles	(Argentina) Jorge Del Buono	(Uruguay) Gustavo Trelles	Mitsubishi Lancer Evo VI	5:48:45.6		10
12	2	28	(Argentina) Gabriel Pozzo	(Argentina) Fabian Cretu	(Argentina) Gabriel Pozzo	Mitsubishi Lancer Evo VI	5:50:26.0	+1:40.4	6
13	3	27	(Argentina) Claudio Marcelo Menzi	(Argentina) Edgardo Galindo	(Argentina) Claudio Marcelo Menzi	Mitsubishi Lancer Evo VI	5:51:31.4	+2:45.8	4
15	4	24	(Austria) Manfred Stohl	(Austria) Peter Müller	(Austria) Manfred Stohl	Mitsubishi Lancer Evo VI	5:58:26.3	+9:40.7	3
16	5	31	(Cyprus) Andreas Peratikos	(Cyprus) Harris Episkopou	(Cyprus) Andreas Peratikos	Mitsubishi Lancer Evo III	6:07:02.3	+18:16.7	2
18	6	44	(Belgium) Bob Colsoul	(Belgium) Tom Colsoul	(Belgium) Bob Colsoul	Mitsubishi Lancer Evo V	6:15:04.4	+26:18.8	1
20	7	32	(Cyprus) Dimi Mavropoulos	(Cyprus) Georgios Alexandrou	(Cyprus) Dimi Mavropoulos	Mitsubishi Lancer Evo VI	6:16:47.2	+28:01.6	0
22	8	47	(Cyprus) Panagiotis Theofanides	(Cyprus) Nikos Theofanides	(Cyprus) Panagiotis Theofanides	Subaru Impreza WRX	6:24:36.0	+35:50.4	0
23	9	49	(Greece) Pavlos Moschoutis	(Greece) Giorgos Petropoulos	(Greece) Pavlos Moschoutis	Mitsubishi Lancer Evo VI	6:24:47.1	+36:01.5	0
24	10	52	(Israel) Johnny Westberg	(Israel) Etai Moldawsky	(Israel) Johnny Westberg	Mitsubishi Lancer Evo VI	6:54:43.6	+1:05:58.0	0
25	11	58	(Cyprus) Andreas Konstantinou	(Cyprus) Marios Potamou	(Cyprus) Andreas Konstantinou	Subaru Impreza WRX	7:37:45.2	+1:48:59.6	0
27	12	54	(Israel) Daniel Levy	(Cyprus) Theodoros Georgiou	(Israel) Daniel Levy	Subaru Impreza WRX	7:43:44.6	+1:54:59.0	0
Retired SS15		38	(Oman) Nizar Al-Shanfari	(Cyprus) Michalakis Michael	(Oman) Nizar Al-Shanfari	Mitsubishi Lancer Evo VI	Retired		0
Retired SS7		45	(Cyprus) Prodromos Prodromou	(Cyprus) Yiannos Hadjichristofi	(Cyprus) Prodromos Prodromou	Mitsubishi Lancer Evo III	Mechanical		0
Retired SS6		40	(Israel) Rami Shohatovich	(Cyprus) Nikitas Stavrinou	(Israel) Rami Shohatovich	Mitsubishi Lancer Evo V	Mechanical		0
Retired SS6		46	(Cyprus) Charalambos Timotheou	(Cyprus) Nicos Panayides	(Cyprus) Charalambos Timotheou	Subaru Impreza 555	Mechanical		0
Retired SS5		39	(Australia) Ron Cremen	(Australia) Linda Long	(Australia) Ron Cremen	Mitsubishi Lancer Evo IV	Accident		0
Retired SS5		57	(Cyprus) Demitris Pieri	(Cyprus) Petros Panteli	(Cyprus) Demitris Pieri	Toyota Celica GT-Four	Steering		0
Retired SS3		59	(Cyprus) Giorgos Koudounias	(Cyprus) Andreas Erotokritou	(Cyprus) Giorgos Koudounias	Renault Clio 16V	Gearbox		0

==== Special stages ====
Day	Stage	Stage name	Length	Winner	Car	Time	Class leaders
Leg 1 (8 Sep)	SS1	Alassa 1	6.22 km	(Austria) Manfred Stohl (Argentina) Gabriel Pozzo	Mitsubishi Lancer Evo VI; Mitsubishi Lancer Evo VI	4:57.9	(Austria) Manfred Stohl (Argentina) Gabriel Pozzo
Leg 1 (8 Sep)	SS2	Prastio 1	11.06 km	(Uruguay) Gustavo Trelles	Mitsubishi Lancer Evo VI	7:22.4	(Argentina) Gabriel Pozzo
Leg 1 (8 Sep)	SS3	Agios Nikolaos 1	11.30 km	(Uruguay) Gustavo Trelles	Mitsubishi Lancer Evo VI	10:45.2	(Uruguay) Gustavo Trelles
Leg 1 (8 Sep)	SS4	Platres 1	11.99 km	(Uruguay) Gustavo Trelles	Mitsubishi Lancer Evo VI	10:35.7	(Uruguay) Gustavo Trelles
Leg 1 (8 Sep)	SS5	Mylikouri 1	31.87 km	(Uruguay) Gustavo Trelles	Mitsubishi Lancer Evo VI	37:44.6	(Uruguay) Gustavo Trelles
Leg 1 (8 Sep)	SS6	Panagia 1	19.52 km	(Uruguay) Gustavo Trelles	Mitsubishi Lancer Evo VI	18:36.7	(Uruguay) Gustavo Trelles
Leg 1 (8 Sep)	SS7	Kourdali	14.92 km	(Austria) Manfred Stohl	Mitsubishi Lancer Evo VI	17:25.2	(Uruguay) Gustavo Trelles
Leg 1 (8 Sep)	SS8	Assinou	25.39 km	(Uruguay) Gustavo Trelles	Mitsubishi Lancer Evo VI	29:17.4	(Uruguay) Gustavo Trelles
Leg 1 (8 Sep)	SS9	Xerarkaka	12.89 km	(Argentina) Gabriel Pozzo	Mitsubishi Lancer Evo VI	15:28.4	(Uruguay) Gustavo Trelles
Leg 2 (9 Sep)	SS10	Platres — Saittas	11.48 km	(Argentina) Claudio Marcelo Menzi	Mitsubishi Lancer Evo VI	10:24.3	(Uruguay) Gustavo Trelles
Leg 2 (9 Sep)	SS11	Alassa 2	6.22 km	(Argentina) Gabriel Pozzo	Mitsubishi Lancer Evo VI	4:54.1	(Uruguay) Gustavo Trelles
Leg 2 (9 Sep)	SS12	Prastio 2	11.06 km	(Argentina) Claudio Marcelo Menzi	Mitsubishi Lancer Evo VI	7:11.1	(Uruguay) Gustavo Trelles
Leg 2 (9 Sep)	SS13	Panagia 2	19.52 km	(Uruguay) Gustavo Trelles (Argentina) Gabriel Pozzo	Mitsubishi Lancer Evo VI; Mitsubishi Lancer Evo VI	18:39.5	(Uruguay) Gustavo Trelles
Leg 2 (9 Sep)	SS14	Mylikouri 2	31.87 km	(Uruguay) Gustavo Trelles	Mitsubishi Lancer Evo VI	37:34.1	(Uruguay) Gustavo Trelles
Leg 2 (9 Sep)	SS15	Prastio 3	11.06 km	(Argentina) Gabriel Pozzo	Mitsubishi Lancer Evo VI	7:13.7	(Uruguay) Gustavo Trelles
Leg 2 (9 Sep)	SS16	Agios Nikolaos 2	11.30 km	(Uruguay) Gustavo Trelles	Mitsubishi Lancer Evo VI	10:46.3	(Uruguay) Gustavo Trelles
Leg 2 (9 Sep)	SS17	Platres 2	11.99 km	(Uruguay) Gustavo Trelles	Mitsubishi Lancer Evo VI	10:37.4	(Uruguay) Gustavo Trelles
Leg 3 (10 Sep)	SS18	Vavatsinia 1	19.11 km	(Argentina) Claudio Marcelo Menzi	Mitsubishi Lancer Evo VI	18:25.7	(Uruguay) Gustavo Trelles
Leg 3 (10 Sep)	SS19	Agios Onoufrios	18.10 km	(Argentina) Claudio Marcelo Menzi	Mitsubishi Lancer Evo VI	18:04.1	(Uruguay) Gustavo Trelles
Leg 3 (10 Sep)	SS20	Lageia 1	9.62 km	(Argentina) Claudio Marcelo Menzi	Mitsubishi Lancer Evo VI	9:20.2	(Uruguay) Gustavo Trelles
Leg 3 (10 Sep)	SS21	Vavatsinia 2	19.11 km	(Austria) Manfred Stohl	Mitsubishi Lancer Evo VI	18:22.9	(Uruguay) Gustavo Trelles
Leg 3 (10 Sep)	SS22	Macheras	13.19 km	(Argentina) Claudio Marcelo Menzi	Mitsubishi Lancer Evo VI	12:50.8	(Uruguay) Gustavo Trelles
Leg 3 (10 Sep)	SS23	Lageia 2	9.62 km	(Austria) Manfred Stohl	Mitsubishi Lancer Evo VI	9:15.1	(Uruguay) Gustavo Trelles

==== Championship standings ====
Pos.	Drivers' championships		
Pos.	Move	Driver	Points
1		(Austria) Manfred Stohl	48
2		(Uruguay) Gustavo Trelles	44
3	1	(Argentina) Gabriel Pozzo	22
4	1	(Finland) Jani Paasonen	21
5	1	(Argentina) Claudio Marcelo Menzi	16
