= 1998 Rally GB =

Rally car race

1998 Wales Rally GB: 54. Network Q Rally of Great Britain
Round 13 of 13 of the 1998 World Rally Championship season
← Previous event	Next event →
- Host country: United Kingdom
- Rally base: (England) Cheltenham
- Dates run: 22 – 24 November 1998
- Stages: 28 (380.30 km; 236.31 miles)
- Stage surface: Gravel
- Overall distance: 1,175.90 km (730.67 miles)

Statistics
- Crews: 168 at start, 82 at finish

Overall results
- Overall winner: (United Kingdom) Richard Burns (United Kingdom) Robert Reid (Japan) Team Mitsubishi Ralliart

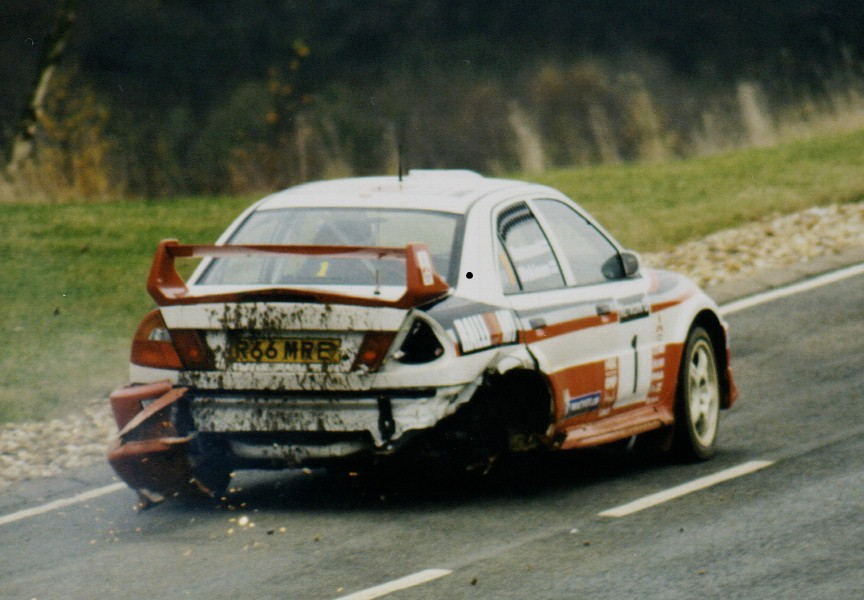
Tommi Mäkinen won the 1998 WRC championship despite crashing out in stage 6

The 1998 Wales Rally GB (formally the 54th Network Q Rally of Great Britain) was held between 22 and 24 November 1998 as the final round of the 1998 World Rally Championship season.

It was the second victory of the 1998 season for Richard Burns and his co-driver Robert Reid. It also saw Tommi Mäkinen score a hat-trick of Drivers' championships after his closest rival Carlos Sainz, just 300 metres from the finish and running in fourth with just the final special stage to go, suffered a huge upset; his Corolla was struck by engine failure at Margam, thus surrendering his title to Mäkinen.

== Report ==
The first stages were won easily by Subaru's Colin McRae, winner in the last three Rally GB's on the WRC calendar. Despite dropping out of title contention at the last round in Australia, he attempted to regain his confidence by battling with Richard Burns for overall victory. On stage 6 at Millbrook, Burns's team-mate, defending champion Tommi Mäkinen, a contender for the title with Carlos Sainz, struck a concrete block, causing his right rear wheel to detach. Mäkinen had slid off the road due to an oil patch left by an Hillman Imp racing in a separate historic event. His Mitsubishi Lancer Evo V limped on three wheels for another few kilometres before the local police pulled him over, retiring him from the event and supposedly ending his title hopes. Sadly, it was also all over for the Scotsman on stage 20, Sweet Lamb. McRae's engine failed on him whilst leading, and caused him to retire. This put fellow Brit Burns in the running for his first Rally GB victory.

All Sainz had to do to clinch the title was finish fourth or better. The Spaniard, a previous twice World Champion, had been in reach of the title ever since Mäkinen's sudden retirement and looked set to clinch title number three.

Sainz's position on the final stages put Mäkinen's hopes in jeopardy. When Sainz's engine blew on the last special stage, he and co-driver Luis Moya were visibly frustrated, with Moya throwing his helmet through the car's rear windscreen, as hopes of a first title since 1992 went up in smoke, allowing Mäkinen, not Sainz, to win number three and thus, clinch a hat trick. Had Sainz reached the finish in his current position, the Spaniard would have been champion by a solitary point. Instead it was Belgian Grégoire De Mévius who finished fourth, succeeding where Sainz failed. Burns, in the Carisma, dominated the last nine stages to win his second WRC rally ever, his first since the Safari Rally at the beginning of March. McRae managed to keep third overall in the championship regardless of his position. Just over half the field did not finish, with 82 cars making the finish at Margam. The PWRC title was taken by Gustavo Trelles, with the race won by Manfred Stohl. Fittingly, it was also Burns' final event in a Mitsubishi, he'd signed for Subaru for 1999 to partner Juha Kankkunen who replaced the Ford-bound McRae.

It was first time since 1976 with Roger Clark that an English driver had won the Rally GB, ending a 22-year wait for their next winner. It was at the same event three years later that Burns would take the title there, and become Britain's second World Rally Champion and England's first. Ford got two of its leading cars onto the podium with Juha Kankkunen and Bruno Thiry both in Escorts.

== Results ==
Results of the 1998 Wales Rally GB
Pos	No.	Driver	Co-driver	Car	Time/retired	Pts
1	2	(United Kingdom) Richard Burns	(United Kingdom) Robert Reid	Mitsubishi Carisma GT Evo IV	3:50:30.6	10
2	7	(Finland) Juha Kankkunen	(Finland) Juha Repo	Ford Escort WRC	+3:46.5	6
3	8	(Belgium) Bruno Thiry	(Belgium) Stéphane Prévot	Ford Escort WRC	+5:27.5	4
4	16	(Belgium) Grégoire De Mévius	(Belgium) Jean-Marc Fortin	Subaru Impreza S3 WRC '97	+7:54.8	3
5	24	(Finland) Sebastian Lindholm	(Finland) Jukka Aho	Ford Escort WRC	+8:15.6	2
6	9	(Finland) Harri Rovanperä	(Finland) Risto Pietiläinen	Seat Cordoba WRC	+10:33.3	1
7	14	(Germany) Armin Schwarz	(Germany) Manfred Hiemer	Ford Escort WRC	+12:16.7	0
8	17	(Poland) Krzysztof Hołowczyc	(Poland) Maciej Wislawski	Subaru Impreza S3 WRC '97	+13:06.7	0
9	33	(Estonia) Markko Märtin	(Estonia) Toomas Kitsing	Toyota Celica GT-Four	+17:11.0	0
10	53	(Austria) Manfred Stohl	(Austria) Peter Müller	Mitsubishi Lancer Evo V	+19:07.2	0

Source: Independent WRC archive
