= 1998 Swedish Rally =

Rallying motorsport event

1998 Safari Rally: 47. International Swedish Rally 1998
Round 2 of 13 of the 1998 World Rally Championship
← Previous event	Next event →
- Host country: Sweden
- Rally base: (Sweden) Karlstad
- Dates run: 6 – 8 February 1998
- Stages: 19

Statistics
- Crews: 78 at start, 42 at finish

Overall results
- Overall winner: (Finland) Tommi Mäkinen; Team Mitsubishi Ralliart

The 47th International Swedish Rally was held between 6-8 February 1998.

== Report ==
=== WRC: Round 2 ===
It was the first World Rally Championship victory of the season for defending champion Tommi Mäkinen. He beat the Toyota Corolla of Carlos Sainz and the Ford Escort WRC of Juha Kankkunen, ensuring that current and former World Rally Champions swept the podium. The home driver Thomas Rådström led for most of the event, but crashed on stage 12, allowing Mäkinen to snatch victory. The Scotsman Colin McRae also went out on stage 12, when electrical gremlins struck his Subaru Impreza WRC.

=== PWRC: Round 2 ===
The PWRC was also won by Stig-Olov Walfridson. He and fellow Swede Kenneth Bäcklund were the main contenders for overall victory; whilst the Uruguayan defending champion Gustavo Trelles came to grief once again, after being struck by a terminal engine failure on Special Stage 2 which meant he had retired from the second rally in a row. Finishing in third place was Juha Kangas.

== Results ==
Results of the 1998 Swedish Rally
Pos	No.	Driver	Co-driver	Car	Time/retired	Pts
1	1	(Finland) Tommi Mäkinen	(Finland) Risto Mannisenmäki	Mitsubishi Lancer Evo IV	3:32:51.6	10
2	5	(Spain) Carlos Sainz	(Spain) Luis Moya	Toyota Corolla WRC	+51.6	6
3	7	(Finland) Juha Kankkunen	(Finland) Juha Repo	Ford Escort WRC	+58.8	4
4	4	(Sweden) Kenneth Eriksson	(Sweden) Staffan Parmander	Subaru Impreza S3 WRC '97	+2:31.7	3
5	11	(Finland) Marcus Grönholm	(Finland) Timo Rautiainen	Toyota Celica GT-Four	+3:29.9	2
6	9	(France) Didier Auriol	(France) Denis Giraudet	Toyota Corolla WRC	+4:18.2	1
