= Risto Mannisenmäki =

Finnish rally co-driver (born 1959)

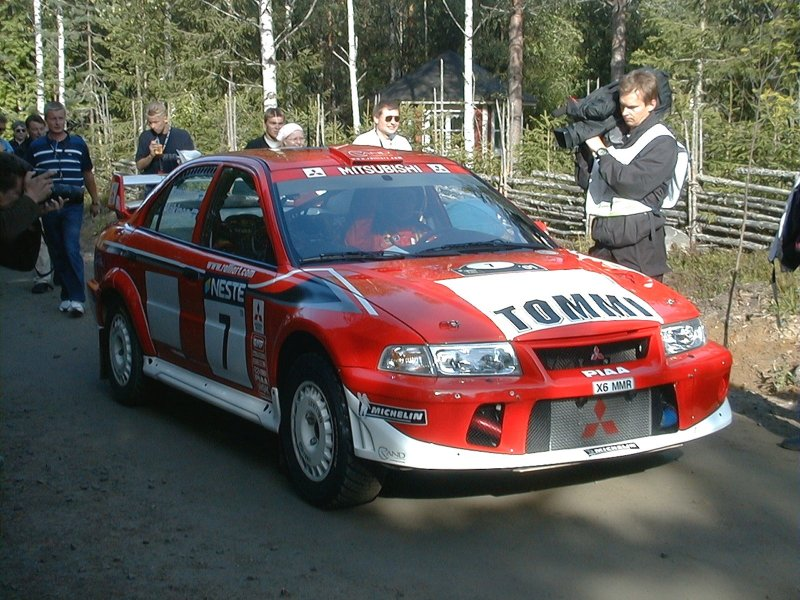
- Mannisenmäki at the 2001 Rally Finland.

Personal information
- Nationality: (Finland) Finnish
- Born: 28 May 1959 (age 67)

World Rally Championship record
- Years active: 1982, 1986–1990, 1992–2001, 2003
- Driver: (Finland) Jari Kaartinen (Finland) Ari Jykylä (Finland) Johnny Sandgårds (Finland) Tommi Mäkinen (Finland) Ari Kōnōnen (Finland) Mika Sohlberg (Finland) Juuso Pykälistö
- Teams: Mitsubishi, Bozian Racing
- Rallies: 69
- Co-championships: 2 (1998, 1999)
- Rally wins: 13
- Podiums: 23
- Stage wins: 145
- First rally: 1982 1000 Lakes Rally
- First win: 1998 Swedish Rally
- Last win: 2001 Safari Rally
- Last rally: 2003 Wales Rally GB

Risto Mannisenmäki (born on 28 May 1959) is a former rally co-driver and two-times world champion with driver Tommi Mäkinen.

== Career ==
Mannisenmäki begun his career in 1982 and was co-driving for various drivers such as Tommi Mäkinen, Sebastian Lindholm and Ari Mökkönen in local rallies. In 1996 and 1997, Risto was the permanent co-driver of Tapio Laukkanen and participated in both Finnish and British local rally series, as well as a few WRC rallies.

For the 1998 season, Mannisenmäki moved on to co-drive with Tommi Mäkinen, after the retirement of Seppo Harjanne. Together, they won the World Rally Championship in 1998 and 1999, and were 5th in the 2000 championships.

During the Rally of Corsica in the 2001 WRC season, both were involved in a major accident where the Lancer driven by Mäkinen and Mannisenmäki ricocheted off of the outside wall into steep cliff-face, turning the car over and narrowly avoiding plunging down the ravine on the opposite side of the road. In the accident, the passenger-side of the Lancer was heavily damaged, breaking Mannisenmäki's back, forcing an end to his co-driving career.

However, after a two-year hiatus, Mannisenmäki returned to participate in a WRC stage, the last in his career, at the Wales rally in the 2003 WRC season, as the co-driver for Juuso Pykälistö. Both finished in 9th position in this rally which also happened to be Mäkinen's final WRC start.

Mannisenmäki won the Vuoden Moottoriurheilija title (engl. Motorsport athlete of the year) in 1999 with Tommi Mäkinen and Mika Häkkinen. Mannisenmäki has been active in rally coaching programs before, and retiring from co-driving, he was chosen in 2004 as AKK-Motorsport's rally coach.
