= Luis Moya =

Spanish rally co-driver (born 1960)

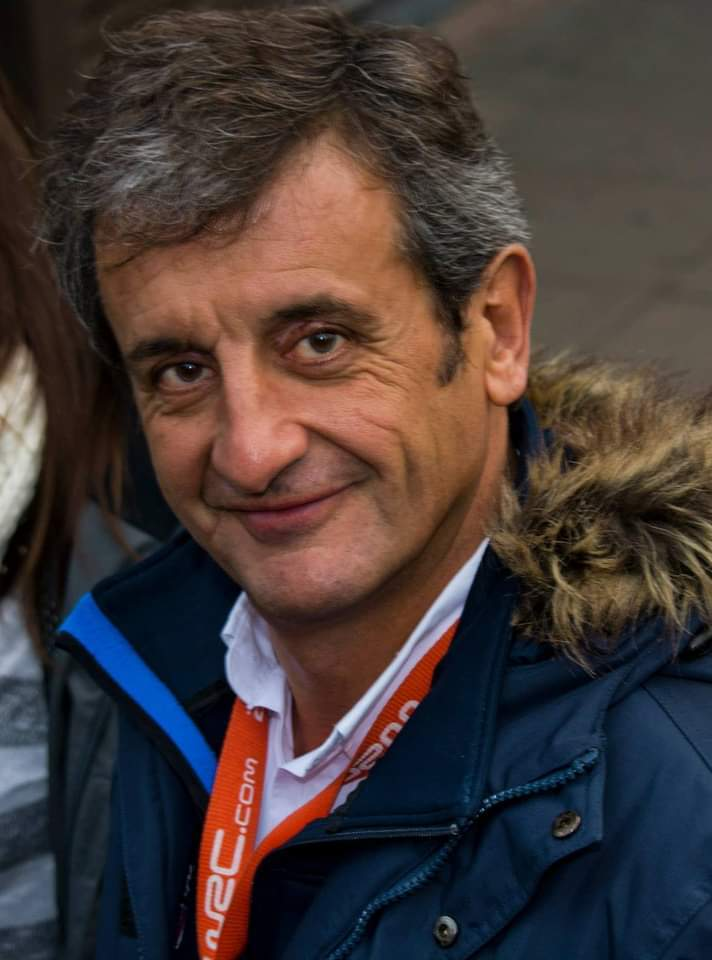
- Luis at the final stage of the WRC in Llandudno, Wales November 2013
- Born: Luis Rodríguez Moya; 23 September 1960 (age 66); A Coruña, Spain

World Rally Championship record
- Years active: 1988–2002
- Driver: (Spain) Carlos Sainz
- Rallies: 161
- Co-championships: 2 (1990, 1992)
- Rally wins: 24
- Podiums: 83
- Stage wins: 720
- Total points: N/A
- First rally: 1988 Rallye de Portugal
- First win: 1990 Acropolis Rally
- Last win: 2002 Rally Argentina
- Last rally: 2002 Rally GB

Luis Rodríguez Moya (born 23 September 1960) is a Spanish former rally co-driver, synonymous with driver Carlos Sainz. He is the third most successful co-driver in the history of the World Rally Championship (WRC), after Daniel Elena and Timo Rautiainen. He was born in A Coruña.

== Biography ==
Only ever navigating at WRC level for his compatriot, 1990 and 1992 Drivers' Champion Carlos Sainz, he scored 24 world rally victories throughout his career for marques such as Subaru, Toyota and Ford, which lasted until he left the latter team at the end of the 2002 season. He was replaced at Sainz's new team, Citroën after retiring at the end of the 2002 season, for the full 2003 and 2004 seasons (as well as two rallies in the 2005 season) by another Spaniard, Marc Martí, former co-driver of 2001 Tour de Corse winner, Jesús Puras (and who went on to co-drive the 2005 Junior World Rally Champion and subsequent works driver for Citroën, Sainz protégé Daniel Sordo).

Moya's long-standing record of individual wins has since been surpassed by Sébastien Loeb's co-driver Daniel Elena and Marcus Grönholm's co-driver Timo Rautiainen.

Moya also served as Subaru World Rally Team's Sporting Director from 2003 to 2006.

Later Moya joined Volkswagen Motorsport's rally team when the team entered the WRC, and has worked as an ambassador for the brand.
