= 1998 Monte Carlo Rally =

Rallying motorsport event

1998 Monte Carlo Rally 66ème Rallye Automobile de Monte-Carlo
Round 1 of the 1998 World Rally Championship
Next event →
- Host country: Monaco
- Dates run: 18 – 21 January 1997
- Stages: 18
- Stage surface: Asphalt/Snow
- Overall distance: 359.19 km (223.19 miles)

Statistics
- Crews: 106 at start, 60 at finish

Overall results
- Overall winner: Spain Carlos Sainz; Toyota Corolla WRC; 4:28:00.5

The 1998 Monte Carlo Rally was the 66th Rallye Automobile de Monte-Carlo. It was won by Carlos Sainz.

It was part of the 1998 World Rally Championship.

== Results ==
Pos.	No.	Driver	Car	Time/Retired	Pts.
1	5	(Spain) Carlos Sainz	Toyota Corolla WRC	4:28:00.5	20
2	7	(Finland) Juha Kankkunen	Ford Escort WRC	4:28:41.3	15
3	3	(Scotland) Colin McRae	Subaru Impreza S5 WRC '98	4:29:01.5	12
4	4	(Italy) Piero Liatti	Subaru Impreza S5 WRC '98	4:29:13.5	10
5	2	(England) Richard Burns	Mitsubishi Carisma GT Evo IV	4:29:23.2	8
6	8	(Belgium) Bruno Thiry	Ford Escort WRC	4:30:20.9	6
7	10	(Germany) Uwe Nittel	Mitsubishi Carisma GT Evo IV	4:34:21.3	4
8	21	(Germany) Armin Kremer	Subaru Impreza S5 WRC '97	4:37:40.1	3
9	16	(France) Gilles Panizzi	Peugeot 306 Maxi	4:39:24.0	2
10	14	(France) François Delecour	Peugeot 306 Maxi	4:40:02.2	1
