= 1998 Safari Rally =

Rallying motorsport event

1998 Safari Rally: 46. Safari Rally Kenya
Round 3 of 13 of the 1998 World Rally Championship season
← Previous event	Next event →
- Host country: Kenya
- Rally base: (Kenya) Nairobi
- Dates run: 28 February – 2 March 1998
- Stages: 16 (1,063.49 km; 660.82 miles)
- Stage surface: Gravel
- Overall distance: 2,339.21 km (1,453.52 miles)

Statistics
- Crews: 49 at start, 19 at finish

Overall results
- Overall winner: (United Kingdom) Richard Burns (United Kingdom) Robert Reid (Japan) Team Mitsubishi Ralliart; 8:57:34.0

The 1998 Safari Rally (formally the 46th Safari Rally Kenya) was held between 28 February and 2 March 1998. It was the first World Rally Championship victory for Richard Burns and his co-driver Robert Reid after his teammate Tommi Mäkinen and fellow Briton Colin McRae both retired.

== Report ==
=== WRC ===
A total of 49 cars gathered in Nairobi for the Safari Rally of 1998. The young Briton, 27-year-old Richard Burns, won stage 1. But his more experienced teammate, Tommi Mäkinen, snatched the lead in stage 2. He was determined to win for the second time, as 1996's winner. But his hopes were dashed after his timing belt broke, causing him to retire. Burns retained the lead as a result, held it to the end, and won his first WRC rally in his career. It was the Ford Escorts of the Finns Juha Kankkunen and Ari Vatanen, both previous Safari Rally winners, who completed the podium in second and third respectively.

=== PWRC ===
Luis Climent, in a Mitsubishi Lancer Evo III, had his first victory of the year. Manfred Stohl finished behind him in second, and the Kenyan Paul Bailey completed the podium.

== Results ==
Results of the 1998 Safari Rally
Pos	No.	Driver	Co-driver	Car	Time/retired	Pts
1	2	(United Kingdom) Richard Burns	(United Kingdom) Robert Reid	Mitsubishi Carisma GT Evo IV	8:57:34.0	10
2	7	(Finland) Juha Kankkunen	(Finland) Juha Repo	Ford Escort WRC	+9:27.0	6
3	8	(Finland) Ari Vatanen	(United Kingdom) Fred Gallagher	Ford Escort WRC	+9:52.0	4
4	6	(France) Didier Auriol	(France) Denis Giraudet	Toyota Corolla WRC	+14:26.0	3
5	11	(Finland) Harri Rovanperä	(Finland) Voitto Silander	Seat Ibiza GTi 16V Evo2	+2:05:38.0	2
6	16	(Austria) Raimund Baumschlager	(Germany) Klaus Wicha	Volkswagen Golf GTi 16V	+2:20:01.0	1
7	18	(Spain) Luis Climent	(Spain) Álex Romani	Mitsubishi Lancer Evo III	+2:28:03.0	0
8	12	(Austria) Kris Rosenberger	(Sweden) Per Carlsson	Volkswagen Golf Kit Car	+2:45:47.0	0
9	19	(Kenya) Marco Brighetti	(Kenya) Abdul Sidi	Subaru Impreza 555	+2:56:01.0	0
10	21	(Uganda) Karim Hirji	(Uganda) Frank Nekusa	Toyota Celica GT-Four	+3:03:29.0	0

Source: Independent WRC archive
