= 2000 Rally GB =

Rally car race

2000 Rally GB 56th Network Q Rally of Britain
- Round 14 of the 2000 World Rally Championship
- Host country: United Kingdom
- Rally base: Cardiff
- Dates run: November 23, 2000 – November 26, 2000
- Stages: 17 (380.80 km; 236.62 miles)
- Stage surface: Gravel

Overall results
- Overall winner: (United Kingdom) Richard Burns (Finland) Marcus Grönholm (Finland) Tommi Mäkinen

The 2000 Rally GB (formally the 56th Network Q Rally of Britain) was the fourteenth and final round of the 2000 World Rally Championship, held over four days from 23 November to 26 November 2000. The race was won by Subaru's Richard Burns, his 9th win in the world rally championship. Despite this, the championship was ultimately won by Marcus Grönholm.

== Background ==
=== Entry list ===
No.	Driver	Co-driver	Entrant	Car	Tyre
World Rally Championship manufacturer entries
1	(Finland) Tommi Mäkinen	(Finland) Risto Mannisenmäki	(Japan) Marlboro Mitsubishi Ralliart	Mitsubishi Lancer Evo VI	MI
2	(Belgium) Freddy Loix	(Belgium) Sven Smeets	(Japan) Marlboro Mitsubishi Ralliart	Mitsubishi Carisma GT Evo VI	MI
3	(United Kingdom) Richard Burns	(United Kingdom) Robert Reid	(Japan) Subaru World Rally Team	Subaru Impreza S6 WRC '00	P
4	(Finland) Juha Kankkunen	(Finland) Juha Repo	(Japan) Subaru World Rally Team	Subaru Impreza S6 WRC '00	P
5	(United Kingdom) Colin McRae	(United Kingdom) Nicky Grist	(United Kingdom) Ford Motor Co. Ltd.	Ford Focus RS WRC '00	MI
6	(Spain) Carlos Sainz	(Spain) Luis Moya	(United Kingdom) Ford Motor Co. Ltd.	Ford Focus RS WRC '00	MI
7	(France) Didier Auriol	(France) Denis Giraudet	(Spain) SEAT Sport	SEAT Córdoba WRC Evo3	P
8	(Finland) Toni Gardemeister	(Finland) Paavo Lukander	(Spain) SEAT Sport	SEAT Córdoba WRC Evo3	P
9	(France) François Delecour	(France) Daniel Grataloup	(France) Peugeot Esso	Peugeot 206 WRC	MI
10	(Finland) Marcus Grönholm	(Finland) Timo Rautiainen	(France) Peugeot Esso	Peugeot 206 WRC	MI
11	(Germany) Armin Schwarz	(Germany) Manfred Hiemer	(Czech Republic) Škoda Motorsport	Škoda Octavia WRC Evo2	MI
12	(Spain) Luis Climent Asensio	(Spain) Álex Romaní	(Czech Republic) Škoda Motorsport	Škoda Octavia WRC Evo2	MI
14	(Sweden) Kenneth Eriksson	(Sweden) Staffan Parmander	(South Korea) Hyundai Castrol WRT	Hyundai Accent WRC	MI
15	(United Kingdom) Alister McRae	(United Kingdom) David Mills	(South Korea) Hyundai Castrol WRT	Hyundai Accent WRC	MI
World Rally Championship entries
16	(Norway) Petter Solberg	(United Kingdom) Phil Mills	(Japan) Subaru World Rally Team	Subaru Impreza S6 WRC '00	MI
17	(Finland) Harri Rovanperä	(Finland) Risto Pietiläinen	(Spain) SEAT Sport	SEAT Córdoba WRC Evo3	-
18	(Finland) Tapio Laukkanen	(Finland) Kaj Lindström	(United Kingdom) Ford Motor Co. Ltd.	Ford Focus RS WRC '00	MI
19	(France) Gilles Panizzi	(France) Hervé Panizzi	(France) Peugeot Esso	Peugeot 206 WRC	MI
20	(United Kingdom) Gwyndaf Evans	(United Kingdom) Howard Davies	(Spain) SEAT Sport	SEAT Córdoba WRC Evo3	-
21	(Estonia) Markko Märtin	(United Kingdom) Michael Park	(Estonia) Lukoil EOS Rally Team	Toyota Corolla WRC	-
22	(Japan) Toshihiro Arai	(United Kingdom) Roger Freeman	(Japan) Spike Subaru Team	Subaru Impreza S5 WRC '99	P
23	(Finland) Janne Tuohino	(Finland) Miikka Anttila	(Japan) LMP Group Ltd	Toyota Corolla WRC	-
25	(Norway) Henning Solberg	(Norway) Runar Pedersen	(Norway) Henning Solberg	Toyota Corolla WRC	MI
26	(Italy) Andrea Navarra	(Italy) Simona Fedeli	(Italy) H.F. Grifone SRL	Toyota Corolla WRC	MI
27	(United Kingdom) David Higgins	(United Kingdom) Shaun O'Gorman	(United Kingdom) David Higgins	Subaru Impreza WRX	MI
29	(United Kingdom) Neil Wearden	(United Kingdom) Trevor Agnew	(United Kingdom) Vauxhall Motorsport	Vauxhall Astra Kit Car	MI
36	(Oman) Hamed Al-Wahaibi	(New Zealand) Tony Sircombe	(Saudi Arabia) Arab World Rally Team	Subaru Impreza S5 WRC '99	-
37	(Greece) Ioannis Papadimitriou	(Greece) Nikolaos Petropoulos	(Greece) Ioannis Papadimitriou	Subaru Impreza 555	MI
38	(France) Frédéric Dor	(France) Didier Breton	(France) F. Dor Rally Team	Subaru Impreza S6 WRC '00	-
41	(United Kingdom) Marcus Dodd	(United Kingdom) John Bennie	(United Kingdom) Marcus Dodd	Subaru Impreza S5 WRC '99	-
42	(United Kingdom) Stephen Finlay	(Republic of Ireland) Rory Kennedy	(United Kingdom) Stephen Finlay	Ford Focus RS WRC '00	P
43	(Germany) Achim Warmbold	(Germany) Antony Warmbold	(Germany) Achim Warmbold	Toyota Corolla WRC	MI
44	(Norway) Roar Vannebo	(Norway) Øygund Treider	(Norway) Roar Vannebo	Toyota Corolla WRC	MI
45	(United Kingdom) Mark Fisher	(United Kingdom) Gordon Noble	(United Kingdom) Mark Fisher	Peugeot 206 WRC	-
48	(United Kingdom) Peter Littler	(United Kingdom) Andy Marchbank	(United Kingdom) Peter Littler	Ford Escort RS Cosworth	-
52	(Republic of Ireland) Eamonn Boland	(United Kingdom) Alun Cook	(Republic of Ireland) Eamonn Boland	Subaru Impreza S5 WRC '98	P
53	(United Kingdom) Glyn Jones	(United Kingdom) Huw Lewis	(United Kingdom) Glyn Jones	Subaru Impreza 555	-
57	(Netherlands) Bert de Jong	(Netherlands) Ton Hillen	(Netherlands) Bert de Jong	Subaru Impreza S5 WRC '98	-
60	(United Kingdom) Niall McShea	(United Kingdom) Michael Orr	(United Kingdom) Niall McShea	Citroën Saxo Kit Car	-
62	(France) Sébastien Loeb	(Monaco) Daniel Elena	(France) Sébastien Loeb	Citroën Saxo VTS	MI
64	(United Kingdom) Simon Redhead	(United Kingdom) Alan Thomas	(United Kingdom) Simon Redhead	Subaru Impreza 555	-
67	(Spain) Joan Compte	(Spain) Enric Oller	(Spain) Joan Compte	Mitsubishi Carisma GT	-
70	(United Kingdom) Robert Ceen	(United Kingdom) Lisa Addy	(United Kingdom) Robert Ceen	Ford Escort RS Cosworth	-
72	(United Kingdom) Martin Healer	(United Kingdom) Martin Pettitt	(United Kingdom) Martin Healer	Ford Escort RS Cosworth	-
73	(Republic of Ireland) Frank O'Mahony	(Republic of Ireland) Hugh McPhillips	(Republic of Ireland) Frank O'Mahony	Subaru Impreza 555	-
74	(United Kingdom) Steve Smith	(United Kingdom) John Richardson	(United Kingdom) Steve Smith	Lancia Delta HF Integrale	-
82	(United Kingdom) Stephen French	(United Kingdom) Colin Booth	(United Kingdom) Stephen French	Ford Escort RS Cosworth	-
83	(Sweden) Anders Grundström	(Sweden) Lars-Ola Nordqvist	(Sweden) Anders Grundström	Mitsubishi Lancer Evo VI	-
88	(United Kingdom) Andy Burnell	(United Kingdom) Jayson Brown	(United Kingdom) Andy Burnell	Peugeot 106 S16	-
89	(United Kingdom) Mike Faulkner	(United Kingdom) Alan Clark	(United Kingdom) Mike Faulkner	Peugeot 106 S16	-
90	(United Kingdom) Paul Wedgbury	(United Kingdom) Seamus Donnelly	(United Kingdom) Paul Wedgbury	Peugeot 106 S16	-
91	(France) Olivier Marty	(France) Jean-Claude Grau	(France) Olivier Marty	Peugeot 106 S16	-
97	(United Kingdom) Charles Payne	(United Kingdom) Craig Thorley	(United Kingdom) Charles Payne	Mitsubishi Lancer Evo	-
98	(France) Cédric Robert	(France) Marie-Pierre Billoux	(France) Cédric Robert	Peugeot 106 S16	-
99	(San Marino) Mirco Baldacci	(Italy) Maurizio Barone	(San Marino) Mirco Baldacci	Renault Clio Williams	-
105	(Australia) Ashlea James	(Australia) Toni Feaver	(Australia) Ashlea James	Proton Satria Kit Car	-
109	(Italy) Stefano Macaluso	(Italy) Giovanni Bernacchini	(Italy) Stefano Macaluso	Fiat Punto Kit Car	-
110	(Italy) Massimo Macaluso	(Italy) Antonio Celot	(Italy) Massimo Macaluso	Fiat Punto Kit Car	-
116	(United Kingdom) Richard Sykes	(United Kingdom) Richard Edwards	(United Kingdom) Richard Sykes	Peugeot 106 S16	-
117	(United Kingdom) Paul Alexander	(United Kingdom) Mike Panes	(United Kingdom) Paul Alexander	Peugeot 106	-
118	(United Kingdom) Barry Pittaway	(United Kingdom) Andrew Tatham	(United Kingdom) Barry Pittaway	Nissan Sunny GTI	-
119	(United Kingdom) Penny Mallory	(United Kingdom) Sue Mee-Underwood	(United Kingdom) Penny Mallory	Ford Focus RS WRC '00	-
122	(Switzerland) Jean-Thierry Vacheron	(Switzerland) Jean-Pierre Schaad	(Switzerland) Jean-Thierry Vacheron	Peugeot 106 S16	-
125	(United Kingdom) James Harvey	(United Kingdom) Paul Arberry	(United Kingdom) James Harvey	Peugeot 106 S16	-
126	(United Kingdom) Andy Gwynne	(United Kingdom) John Youd	(United Kingdom) Andy Gwynne	Vauxhall Corsa B GSI	-
127	(United Kingdom) Ben Briant	(United Kingdom) Aled Davies	(United Kingdom) Ben Briant	Vauxhall Corsa B GSI	-
128	(Netherlands) Roger van Iersel	(Netherlands) Peter Stordiau	(Netherlands) Roger van Iersel	Nissan Micra	-
129	(Germany) Kurt Kreutz	(Germany) Günter Kirberg	(Germany) Kurt Kreutz	Toyota Starlet	-
130	(Italy) Marco Cavigioli	(Italy) Nicola Arena	(Italy) Marco Cavigioli	Suzuki Swift GTi	-
131	(United Kingdom) Paul Griffiths	(United Kingdom) Keith Davies	(United Kingdom) Paul Griffiths	Nissan Micra	-
132	(United Kingdom) Geoff Fielding	(United Kingdom) Clive Molyneux	(United Kingdom) Geoff Fielding	Ford Escort RS Cosworth	-
139	(United Kingdom) Lisa Parish	(United Kingdom) Jim Perkins	(United Kingdom) Lisa Parish	Peugeot 106 S16	-
140	(United Kingdom) Colin Bound	(United Kingdom) Emyr Jones	(United Kingdom) Colin Bound	Nissan Micra	-
142	(United Kingdom) Rodney Bennett	(United Kingdom) Robin Langley	(United Kingdom) Rodney Bennett	Lancia Delta HF Integrale	-
150	(Japan) Shinobu Kitani	(Japan) Makoto Mizoi	(Japan) Shinobu Kitani	Rover Mini Cooper	-
154	(United Kingdom) Armitage William	(United Kingdom) Jeremy Pole	(United Kingdom) Armitage William	Peugeot 306 S16	-
156	(United Kingdom) John Brooks	(United Kingdom) Stephen White	(United Kingdom) John Brooks	Vauxhall Corsa B GSI	-
157	(United Kingdom) Neil Edwards	(United Kingdom) Bob Rose	(United Kingdom) Neil Edwards	Peugeot 106 S16	-
158	(United Kingdom) Edward Pugh	(United Kingdom) Phil Pugh	(United Kingdom) Edward Pugh	Ford Ka	-
159	(United Kingdom) Richard Hinton	(United Kingdom) Adrian Seabridge	(United Kingdom) Richard Hinton	Ford Escort RS Cosworth	-
Group N Cup entries
28	(Uruguay) Gustavo Trelles	(Argentina) Jorge Del Buono	(Uruguay) Gustavo Trelles	Mitsubishi Lancer Evo VI	P
30	(Austria) Manfred Stohl	(Austria) Peter Müller	(Austria) Manfred Stohl	Mitsubishi Lancer Evo VI	P
31	(Peru) Ramón Ferreyros	(Spain) Diego Vallejo	(Peru) Ramón Ferreyros	Mitsubishi Lancer Evo VI	-
32	(Sweden) Stig Blomqvist	(Venezuela) Ana Goñi	(Sweden) Stig Blomqvist	Mitsubishi Lancer Evo VI	MI
33	(Sweden) Kenneth Bäcklund	(Sweden) Tord Andersson	(Sweden) Kenneth Bäcklund	Mitsubishi Lancer Evo VI	MI
34	(Sweden) Pernilla Walfridsson-Solberg	(Sweden) Lotta Babington Thorszelius	(Sweden) Swedish ASF	Mitsubishi Lancer Evo VI	P
35	(Italy) Renato Travaglia	(Italy) Flavio Zanella	(Italy) Renato Travaglia	Mitsubishi Lancer Evo VI	P
40	(Finland) Olli Harkki	(Finland) Kari Mustalahti	(Finland) Olli Harkki	Mitsubishi Lancer Evo VI	P
46	(Norway) Martin Stenshorne	(United Kingdom) Clive Jenkins	(Norway) Martin Stenshorne	Mitsubishi Lancer Evo	-
49	(New Zealand) Reece Jones	(New Zealand) Leo Bult	(New Zealand) Reece Jones	Mitsubishi Lancer Evo VI	-
50	(United Kingdom) Gavin Cox	(United Kingdom) Tim Hobbs	(United Kingdom) Gavin Cox	Mitsubishi Lancer Evo VI	-
51	(United Kingdom) Guy Anderson	(United Kingdom) David Taylor	(United Kingdom) Guy Anderson	Mitsubishi Lancer Evo VI	-
54	(United Kingdom) Stuart Egglestone	(United Kingdom) Steve Egglestone	(United Kingdom) Stuart Egglestone	Mitsubishi Lancer Evo	-
55	(United Kingdom) Jeremy Easson	(United Kingdom) Nigel Gardner	(United Kingdom) Jeremy Easson	Mitsubishi Lancer Evo VI	-
56	(Belgium) Pieter Tsjoen	(Belgium) Dany Colebunders	(Belgium) Pieter Tsjoen	Mitsubishi Lancer Evo VI	-
58	(Belgium) Chris Van Woensel	(Belgium) Rik Snaet	(Belgium) Chris Van Woensel	Subaru Impreza WRX	-
61	(France) Fabrice Morel	(France) David Marty	(France) Fabrice Morel	Mitsubishi Lancer Evo VI	-
63	(Finland) Jussi Välimäki	(Finland) Jarkko Kalliopelo	(Finland) Jussi Välimäki	Mitsubishi Lancer Evo III	-
65	(Belgium) Bob Colsoul	(Belgium) Tom Colsoul	(Belgium) Bob Colsoul	Mitsubishi Lancer Evo VI	-
66	(United Kingdom) Richard Davis	(United Kingdom) David Williams	(United Kingdom) Richard Davis	Mitsubishi Lancer Evo	-
68	(Netherlands) Peter Bijvelds	(Netherlands) Piet Bijvelds	(Netherlands) Peter Bijvelds	Mitsubishi Lancer Evo VI	-
69	(Netherlands) Johan Deen	(Netherlands) Harmen Scholtalbers	(Netherlands) Johan Deen	Mitsubishi Lancer Evo	-
71	(United Kingdom) Phil Morgan	(United Kingdom) Martin Douglas	(United Kingdom) Phil Morgan	Mitsubishi Lancer Evo VI	-
75	(United Kingdom) Oliver Clark	(United Kingdom) Richard Pashley	(United Kingdom) Oliver Clark	Mitsubishi Lancer Evo VI	-
77	(United Kingdom) Alistair Ginley	(United Kingdom) Greg Haynes	(United Kingdom) Alistair Ginley	Subaru Impreza	-
78	(Netherlands) René Kuipers	(Netherlands) Maurice Lammersen	(Netherlands) René Kuipers	Mitsubishi Lancer Evo IV	-
79	(Netherlands) Harry Kleinjan	(Netherlands) Radboud van Hoek	(Netherlands) Harry Kleinjan	Mitsubishi Lancer Evo	-
80	(Sweden) Thorleif Granlöf	(Sweden) Christer Granlöf	(Sweden) Thorleif Granlöf	Mitsubishi Lancer Evo IV	-
81	(United Kingdom) Don Whitehurst	(United Kingdom) Terry Atherton	(United Kingdom) Don Whitehurst	Subaru Impreza	-
84	(Netherlands) Ries Huisman	(Netherlands) Bart van Riemsdijk	(Netherlands) Ries Huisman	Subaru Impreza	-
85	(United Kingdom) Natalie Barratt	(United Kingdom) Pauline Gullick	(United Kingdom) Natalie Barratt	Mitsubishi Lancer Evo IV	-
86	(United Kingdom) Mark Worley	(United Kingdom) David Gamblin	(United Kingdom) Mark Worley	Mitsubishi Lancer Evo	-
93	(United Kingdom) Arwyn Williams	(United Kingdom) Terry Moore	(United Kingdom) Arwyn Williams	Mitsubishi Lancer Evo	-
94	(United Kingdom) Robert Swann	(United Kingdom) Ken Bowman	(United Kingdom) Robert Swann	Mitsubishi Lancer Evo	-
95	(Sweden) Magnus Jansson	(Sweden) Thomas Fredriksson	(Sweden) Magnus Jansson	Mitsubishi Lancer Evo IV	-
96	(United Kingdom) Steve Palmer	(United Kingdom) Bruce Harper	(United Kingdom) Steve Palmer	Mitsubishi Lancer Evo	-
100	(Italy) Luca Betti	(Italy) Paolo Del Grande	(Italy) Luca Betti	Renault Clio 16S	-
101	(United Kingdom) Edward Roberts	(United Kingdom) Gary Hunter	(United Kingdom) Edward Roberts	Mitsubishi Lancer Evo	-
102	(United Kingdom) Paul Kirtley	(United Kingdom) David Jones	(United Kingdom) Paul Kirtley	Subaru Impreza	-
103	(United Kingdom) Peter Stephenson	(United Kingdom) Alan Whittaker	(United Kingdom) Peter Stephenson	Mitsubishi Lancer Evo	-
104	(United Kingdom) Charlie Exton	(United Kingdom) Suzanne Emiliani	(United Kingdom) Charlie Exton	Honda Integra Type-R DC2	-
106	(United Kingdom) Tony Jardine	(United Kingdom) Des Kelly	(United Kingdom) Tony Jardine	Honda Integra Type-R DC2	-
107	(Germany) Andreas Mansfeld	(Germany) Gerd Ottenburger	(Germany) Andreas Mansfeld	Honda Integra Type-R DC2	-
108	(United Kingdom) Miles Johnston	(United Kingdom) Mark Andrews	(United Kingdom) Miles Johnston	Vauxhall Astra GSI 16V	-
111	(Italy) Davide Catania	(Italy) Federico Vescarelli	(Italy) Davide Catania	Mitsubishi Lancer Evo V	-
112	(United Kingdom) Leon Pesticcio	(United Kingdom) Mark Jones	(United Kingdom) Leon Pesticcio	Mitsubishi Lancer Evo	-
113	(Germany) Joachim Müller-Wende	(United Kingdom) Roger Burkill	(Germany) Joachim Müller-Wende	Subaru Impreza	-
114	(United Kingdom) Peter Heatherington	(United Kingdom) Chris Heatherington	(United Kingdom) Peter Heatherington	Mitsubishi Lancer Evo	-
115	(United Kingdom) Jeff Williams	(United Kingdom) Stewart Foley	(United Kingdom) Jeff Williams	Mitsubishi Lancer Evo	-
120	(United Kingdom) John Lloyd	(United Kingdom) Paul Amandini	(United Kingdom) John Lloyd	Subaru Impreza	-
121	(Czech Republic) Milan Liška	(Czech Republic) Martin Pólak	(Czech Republic) Milan Liška	Mitsubishi Lancer Evo VI	-
124	(United Kingdom) Graeme Presswell	(United Kingdom) Martin Saunders	(United Kingdom) Graeme Presswell	Mitsubishi Lancer Evo III	-
133	(United Kingdom) Patrick Mott	(United Kingdom) David Taylor	(United Kingdom) Patrick Mott	Proton Satria	-
134	(United Kingdom) Chris Wales	(United Kingdom) Robert Collins	(United Kingdom) Chris Wales	Subaru Impreza	-
135	(United Kingdom) Harry Dodd	(United Kingdom) Roy Campbell	(United Kingdom) Harry Dodd	Subaru Impreza WRX	-
136	(United Kingdom) Dave Hull	(United Kingdom) Pamela Hull	(United Kingdom) Dave Hull	Vauxhall Astra GSI 16V	-
137	(Finland) Jukka Iho	(Finland) Heikki Julin	(Finland) Jukka Iho	Honda Civic VTi	-
138	(United Kingdom) David Bateson	(United Kingdom) Daniel Barritt	(United Kingdom) David Bateson	Volkswagen Polo 16V	-
141	(United Kingdom) Colin Minton	(United Kingdom) Graeme Walker	(United Kingdom) Colin Minton	Subaru Impreza	-
143	(Italy) Alessandro Gai	(Italy) Monica Fortunato	(Italy) Alessandro Gai	SEAT Ibiza TDI	-
144	(Italy) Demitri Brunelo	(Italy) Mitia Dotta	(Italy) Demitri Brunelo	SEAT Ibiza GTI 16V	-
145	(United Kingdom) Sabrina Shaw	(United Kingdom) Ian Bevan	(United Kingdom) Sabrina Shaw	Subaru Impreza	-
146	(United Kingdom) Tim Mason	(United Kingdom) Colin Thompson	(United Kingdom) Tim Mason	Honda Civic VTi	-
147	(United Kingdom) Alan Thompson	(United Kingdom) James Thompson	(United Kingdom) Alan Thompson	Mitsubishi Lancer Evo	-
148	(United Kingdom) Maurice Jellie	(United Kingdom) Peter Jolly	(United Kingdom) Maurice Jellie	Mitsubishi Lancer Evo	-
149	(Italy) Mauro Zamparutti	(Italy) Andrea Monsutti	(Italy) Mauro Zamparutti	Opel Astra GSi 16V	-
151	(Japan) Yoshihiko Sano	(Japan) Tetsuya Aiko	(Japan) Yoshihiko Sano	Rover Mini Cooper	-
152	(France) Philippe Gobert	(France) Claude le Jean	(France) Philippe Gobert	Suzuki Swift GTi	-
153	(Italy) Pierluigi Comelli	(Italy) Flavio Candoni	(Italy) Pierluigi Comelli	Peugeot 306 S16	-
155	(United Kingdom) David Beesley	(United Kingdom) Derrick Ramsdall	(United Kingdom) David Beesley	Vauxhall Corsa B GSI	-

=== Itinerary ===
All dates and times are in GMT (UTC+-00:00)

Date	Time	No.	Stage name	Distance
23 November	18:58	SS1	Cardiff 1	2.43 km
24 November	07:34	SS2	St. Gwynno	13.67 km
24 November	08:01	SS3	Tyle	10.58 km
24 November	08:37	SS4	Rhondda 1	26.47 km
24 November	11:58	SS5	Crychan	15.57 km
24 November	12:29	SS6	Halfway	17.45 km
24 November	16:00	SS7	Hafren Sweet Lamb	27.23 km
24 November	16:42	SS8	Myherin	16.79 km
Leg 1 total: 130.19 km
25 November	07:56	SS9	Rhondda 2	26.47 km
25 November	08:57	SS10	Rheola 1	31.47 km
25 November	10:56	SS11	Resolfen	46.45 km
25 November	13:42	SS12	Rheola 2	31.47 jm
25 November	15:00	SS13	Margam 1	28.1 km
25 November	18:01	SS14	Cardiff 2	2.43 km
Leg 2 total: 166.42 km
26 November	08:40	SS15	Brechfa	29.80 km
26 November	09:28	SS16	Trawscoed	26.26 km
26 November	13:40	SS17	Margam 2	28.13 km
Leg 3 total: 84.19 km
Rally total: 380.80 km

== Results ==
=== Overall ===
Pos.	No.	Driver	Co-driver	Team	Car	Time	Difference	Points
1	3	(United Kingdom) Richard Burns	(United Kingdom) Robert Reid	(Japan) Subaru World Rally Team	Subaru Impreza S6 WRC '00	3:43:01.9	+-0:00	10
2	10	(Finland) Marcus Grönholm	(Finland) Timo Rautiainen	(France) Peugeot Esso	Peugeot 206 WRC	3:44:07.5	+1:05.6	6
3	1	(Finland) Tommi Mäkinen	(Finland) Risto Mannisenmäki	(Japan) Marlboro Mitsubishi Ralliart	Mitsubishi Lancer Evo VI	3:44:16.9	+1:15.0	4
4	6	(Spain) Carlos Sainz Sr.	(Spain) Luis Moya	(United Kingdom) Ford Motor Co. Ltd.	Ford Focus WRC	3:44:35.4	+1:33.5	3
5	4	(Finland) Juha Kankkunen	(Finland) Juha Repo	(Japan) Subaru World Rally Team	Subaru Impreza WRC	3:44:48.8	+1:46.9	2
6	9	(France) François Delecour	(France) Daniel Grataloup	(France) Peugeot Esso	Peugeot 206 WRC	3:44:50.4	+1.48.5	1

=== World Rally Cars ===
==== Classification ====
Position		No.	Driver	Co-driver	Entrant	Car	Time	Difference	Points
Event	Class	No.	Driver	Co-driver	Entrant	Car	Time	Difference	Points
1	1	3	(United Kingdom) Richard Burns	(United Kingdom) Robert Reid	(Japan) Subaru World Rally Team	Subaru Impreza S6 WRC '00	3:43:01.9	+-0:00	10
2	2	10	(Finland) Marcus Grönholm	(Finland) Timo Rautiainen	(France) Peugeot Esso	Peugeot 206 WRC	3:44:07.5	+1:05.6	6
3	3	1	(Finland) Tommi Mäkinen	(Finland) Risto Mannisenmäki	(Japan) Marlboro Mitsubishi Ralliart	Mitsubishi Lancer Evo VI	3:44:16.9	+1:15.0	4
4	4	6	(Spain) Carlos Sainz Sr.	(Spain) Luis Moya	(United Kingdom) Ford Motor Co. Ltd.	Ford Focus RS WRC	3:44:35.4	+1:33.5	3
5	5	4	(Finland) Juha Kankkunen	(Finland) Juha Repo	(Japan) Subaru World Rally Team	Subaru Impreza WRC	3:44:48.8	+1:46.9	2
6	6	9	(France) François Delecour	(France) Daniel Grataloup	(France) Peugeot Esso	Peugeot 206 WRC	3:44:50.4	+1.48.5	1
9	7	7	(France) Didier Auriol	(France) Denis Giraudet	(Spain) SEAT Sport	SEAT Córdoba WRC Evo3	3:47:29.4	+4:27.5	0
11	8	15	(United Kingdom) Alister McRae	(United Kingdom) David Senior	(South Korea) Hyundai Castrol World Rally Team	Hyundai Accent WRC	3:49:04.7	+6:02.8	0
12	9	8	(Finland) Toni Gardemeister	(Finland) Paavo Lukander	(Spain) SEAT Sport	SEAT Córdoba WRC Evo2	3:50:01.0	+6:59.1	0
13	10	11	(Germany) Armin Schwarz	(Germany) Manfred Hiemer	(Czech Republic) Škoda Motorsport	Škoda Octavia WRC Evo2	3:52:49.3	+9:47.4	0
16	11	12	(Spain) Luis Climent Asensio	(Spain) Álex Romaní	(Czech Republic) Škoda Motorsport	Škoda Octavia WRC Evo2	3:59:59.1	+16:57.2	0
Retired SS12		5	(United Kingdom) Colin McRae	(United Kingdom) Nicky Grist	(United Kingdom) Ford Motor Co. Ltd.	Ford Focus RS WRC '00	Accident		0
Retired SS4		14	(Sweden) Kenneth Eriksson	(Sweden) Staffan Parmander	(South Korea) Hyundai Castrol World Rally Team	Hyundai Accent WRC	Mechanical		0
Retired SS2		2	(Belgium) Freddy Loix	(Belgium) Sven Smeets	(Japan) Marlboro Mitsubishi Ralliart	Mitsubishi Carisma GT Evo VI	Accident		0

==== Special stages ====
Day	Stage	Stage name	Length	Winner	Car	Time	Class leaders
23 Nov	SS1	Cardiff 1	2.43 km	(Finland) Juha Kankkunen	Subaru Impreza S6 WRC '00	2:19.5	(Finland) Juha Kankkunen
24 Nov	SS2	St. Gwynno	13.67 km	(Norway) Petter Solberg	Subaru Impreza S6 WRC '00	6:46.3	(Norway) Petter Solberg
24 Nov	SS3	Tyle	10.58 km	(Finland) Marcus Grönholm	Peugeot 206 WRC	5:48.2	(United Kingdom) Colin McRae
24 Nov	SS4	Rhondda 1	26.47 km	(Finland) Marcus Grönholm	Peugeot 206 WRC	14:26.5	(United Kingdom) Colin McRae
24 Nov	SS5	Crychan	15.57 km	(Finland) Marcus Grönholm	Peugeot 206 WRC	9:09.4	(Finland) Marcus Grönholm
24 Nov	SS6	Halfway	17.45 km	(United Kingdom) Richard Burns	Subaru Impreza S6 WRC '00	10:09.8	(Finland) Marcus Grönholm
24 Nov	SS7	Hafren Sweet Lamb	27.23 km	(United Kingdom) Colin McRae	Ford Focus RS WRC '00	16:36.9	(United Kingdom) Colin McRae
24 Nov	SS8	Myherin	16.79 km	(United Kingdom) Colin McRae	Ford Focus RS WRC '00	9:54.8	(United Kingdom) Colin McRae
25 Nov	SS9	Rhondda 2	26.47 km	(United Kingdom) Richard Burns	Subaru Impreza S6 WRC '00	14:36.1	(United Kingdom) Colin McRae
25 Nov	SS10	Rheola 1	31.47 km	(United Kingdom) Colin McRae	Ford Focus RS WRC '00	17:40.7	(United Kingdom) Colin McRae
25 Nov	SS11	Resolfen	46.45 km	(United Kingdom) Colin McRae	Ford Focus RS WRC '00	25:15.7	(United Kingdom) Colin McRae
25 Nov	SS12	Rheola 2	31:47 km	(United Kingdom) Richard Burns	Subaru Impreza S6 WRC '00	17:51.3	(Finland) Marcus Grönholm
25 Nov	SS13	Margam 1	28.13 km	(United Kingdom) Richard Burns	Subaru Impreza S6 WRC '00	17:10.0	(United Kingdom) Richard Burns
25 Nov	SS14	Cardiff 2	2.43 km	(Norway) Petter Solberg	Subaru Impreza S6 WRC '00	2:18.5	(United Kingdom) Richard Burns
26 Nov	SS15	Brechfa	29.80 km	(United Kingdom) Richard Burns	Subaru Impreza S6 WRC '00	17:32.7	(United Kingdom) Richard Burns
26 Nov	SS16	Trawscoed	26.62 km	(Finland) Tommi Mäkinen	Mitsubishi Lancer Evo VI	16:17.8	(United Kingdom) Richard Burns
26 Nov	SS17	Margam 2	28.13 km	(Finland) Tommi Mäkinen	Mitsubishi Lancer Evo VI	16:57.7	(United Kingdom) Richard Burns

==== Championship standings ====
Pos.	Drivers' championships			Co-drivers' championships			Manufacturers' championships		
Pos.	Move	Driver	Points	Move	Co-driver	Points	Move	Manufacturer	Points
1		(Finland) Marcus Grönholm	65		(Finland) Timo Rautiainen			(France) Peugeot Esso	111
2		(United Kingdom) Richard Burns	60		(United Kingdom) Robert Reid			(United Kingdom) Ford Motor Co. Ltd.	91
3	1	(Spain) Carlos Sainz Sr.	46	1	(Spain) Luis Moya			(Japan) Subaru World Rally Team	88
4	1	(United Kingdom) Colin McRae	43	1	(United Kingdom) Nicky Grist			(Japan) Marlboro Mitsubishi Ralliart	43
5		(Finland) Tommi Mäkinen	36		(Finland) Risto Mannisenmäki			(Spain) SEAT Sport	11

=== FIA Cup for Production Rally Drivers ===
==== Classification ====
Position		No.	Driver	Co-driver	Entrant	Car	Time	Difference	Points
Event	Class	No.	Driver	Co-driver	Entrant	Car	Time	Difference	Points
17	1	30	(Austria) Manfred Stohl	(Austria) Peter Müller	(Austria) Manfred Stohl	Mitsubishi Lancer Evo VI	4:07:45.3	+-0:00	10
18	2	33	(Sweden) Kenneth Bäcklund	(Sweden) Tord Andersson	(Sweden) Kenneth Bäcklund	Mitsubishi Lancer Evo VI	4:09:30.8	+1:45.5	6
19	3	40	(Finland) Olli Harkki	(Finland) Kari Mustalahti	(Finland) Olli Harkki	Mitsubishi Lancer Evo VI	4:13:11.3	+5:26.0	4
21	4	31	(Peru) Ramón Ferreyros	(Spain) Diego Vallejo	(Peru) Ramón Ferreyros	Mitsubishi Lancer Evo VI	4:15:03.1	+7:17.8	3
22	5	50	(United Kingdom) Gavin Cox	(United Kingdom) Tim Hobbs	(United Kingdom) Gavin Cox	Mitsubishi Lancer Evo VI	4:15:59.9	+8:14.6	2
23	6	55	(United Kingdom) Jeremy Easson	(United Kingdom) Nigel Gardner	(United Kingdom) Jeremy Easson	Mitsubishi Lancer Evo VI	4:16:23.4	+8:38.1	1
24	7	35	(Italy) Renato Travaglia	(Italy) Flavio Zanella	(Italy) Renato Travaglia	Mitsubishi Lancer Evo VI	4:16:25.6	+8:40.3	0
25	8	49	(New Zealand) Reece Jones	(New Zealand) Leo Bult	(New Zealand) Reece Jones	Mitsubishi Lancer Evo VI	4:17:04.0	+9:18.7	0
28	9	51	(United Kingdom) Guy Anderson	(United Kingdom) David Taylor	(United Kingdom) Guy Anderson	Mitsubishi Lancer Evo VI	4:23:25.9	+15:40.6	0
29	10	58	(Belgium) Chris Van Woensel	(Belgium) Rik Snaet	(Belgium) Chris Van Woensel	Subaru Impreza WRX	4:23:48.6	`+16:03.3	0
30	11	28	(Uruguay) Gustavo Trelles	(Argentina) Jorge Del Buono	(Uruguay) Gustavo Trelles	Mitsubishi Lancer Evo VI	4:23:43.8	+16:58.5	0
31	12	63	(Finland) Jussi Välimäki	(Finland) Jarkko Kalliopelo	(Finland) Jussi Välimäki	Mitsubishi Lancer Evo III	4:26:01.3	+18:16.0	0
33	13	75	(United Kingdom) Oliver Clark	(United Kingdom) Richard Pashley	(United Kingdom) Oliver Clark	Mitsubishi Lancer Evo VI	4:28:06.9	+20:21.6	0
35	14	34	(Sweden) Pernilla Walfridsson-Solberg	(Sweden) Lotta Babington Thorszelius	(Sweden) Swedish ASF	Mitsubishi Lancer Evo VI	4:30:19.9	+22:34.6	0
36	15	85	(United Kingdom) Natalie Barratt	(United Kingdom) Pauline Gullick	(United Kingdom) Natalie Barratt	Mitsubishi Lancer Evo IV	4:30:28.8	+22:43.5	0
37	16	65	(Belgium) Bob Colsoul	(Belgium) Tom Colsoul	(Belgium) Bob Colsoul	Mitsubishi Lancer Evo VI	4:30:44.9	+22:59.6	0
42	17	94	(United Kingdom) Robert Swann	(United Kingdom) Ken Bowman	(United Kingdom) Robert Swann	Mitsubishi Lancer Evo	4:39:01.3	+31:16.0	0
44	18	77	(United Kingdom) Alistair Ginley	(United Kingdom) Greg Haynes	(United Kingdom) Alistair Ginley	Subaru Impreza	4:40:02.8	+32:17.5	0
45	19	81	(United Kingdom) Don Whitehurst	(United Kingdom) Terry Atherton	(United Kingdom) Don Whitehurst	Subaru Impreza	4:40:53.1	+33:07.8	0
47	20	46	(Norway) Martin Stenshorne	(United Kingdom) Clive Jenkins	(Norway) Martin Stenshorne	Mitsubishi Lancer Evo	4:43:47.8	+36:02.5	0
48	21	78	(Netherlands) René Kuipers	(Netherlands) Maurice Lammersen	(Netherlands) René Kuipers	Mitsubishi Lancer Evo IV	4:44:51.6	+37:06.3	0
49	22	121	(Czech Republic) Milan Liška	(Czech Republic) Martin Pólak	(Czech Republic) Milan Liška	Mitsubishi Lancer Evo VI	4:49:27.6	+41:42.3	0
53	23	114	(United Kingdom) Peter Heatherington	(United Kingdom) Chris Heatherington	(United Kingdom) Peter Heatherington	Mitsubishi Lancer Evo	4:51:45.8	+44:00.5	0
54	24	71	(United Kingdom) Phil Morgan	(United Kingdom) Martin Douglas	(United Kingdom) Phil Morgan	Mitsubishi Lancer Evo VI	4:52:37.7	+44:52.4	0
55	25	113	(Germany) Joachim Müller-Wende	(United Kingdom) Roger Burkill	(Germany) Joachim Müller-Wende	Subaru Impreza	4:52:38.7	+44:52.4	0
58	26	84	(Netherlands) Ries Huisman	(Netherlands) Bart van Riemsdijk	(Netherlands) Ries Huisman	Subaru Impreza	4:56:38.7	+44:53.4	0
61	27	107	(Germany) Andreas Mansfeld	(Germany) Gerd Ottenburger	(Germany) Andreas Mansfeld	Honda Integra Type-R DC2	5:02:31.8	+54:46.5	0
63	28	134	(United Kingdom) Chris Wales	(United Kingdom) Robert Collins	(United Kingdom) Chris Wales	Subaru Impreza	5:06:52.1	+59:06.8	0
64	29	147	(United Kingdom) Alan Thompson	(United Kingdom) James Thompson	(United Kingdom) Alan Thompson	Mitsubishi Lancer Evo	5:08:51.3	+1:01:06.0	0
68	30	141	(United Kingdom) Colin Minton	(United Kingdom) Graeme Walker	(United Kingdom) Colin Minton	Subaru Impreza	5:15:44.2	+1:07:58.9	0
71	31	133	(United Kingdom) Patrick Mott	(United Kingdom) David Taylor	(United Kingdom) Patrick Mott	Proton Satria	5:23:46.4	+1:16:01.1	0
72	32	149	(Italy) Mauro Zamparutti	(Italy) Andrea Monsutti	(Italy) Mauro Zamparutti	Opel Astra GSi 16V	5:24:00.9	+1:16:15.6	0
74	33	146	(United Kingdom) Tim Mason	(United Kingdom) Colin Thompson	(United Kingdom) Tim Mason	Honda Civic VTi	5:25:16.1	+1:17:30.8	0
75	34	104	(United Kingdom) Charlie Exton	(United Kingdom) Suzanne Emiliani	(United Kingdom) Charlie Exton	Honda Integra Type-R DC2	5:27:34.2	+1:19:48.9	0
76	35	136	(United Kingdom) Dave Hull	(United Kingdom) Pamela Hull	(United Kingdom) Dave Hull	Vauxhall Astra GSI 16V	5:29:46.1	+1:22:00.8	0
77	36	137	(Finland) Jukka Iho	(Finland) Heikki Julin	(Finland) Jukka Iho	Honda Civic VTi	5:35:29.4	+1:27:44.1	0
78	37	153	(Italy) Pierluigi Comelli	(Italy) Flavio Candoni	(Italy) Pierluigi Comelli	Peugeot 306 S16	5:39:12.5	+1:31:27.2	0
79	38	151	(Japan) Yoshihiko Sano	(Japan) Tetsuya Aiko	(Japan) Yoshihiko Sano	Rover Mini Cooper	6:27:29.7	+2:19:44.4	0
Retired SS17		79	(Netherlands) Harry Kleinjan	(Netherlands) Radboud van Hoek	(Netherlands) Harry Kleinjan	Mitsubishi Lancer Evo	Accident		0
Retired SS15		143	(Italy) Alessandro Gai	(Italy) Monica Fortunato	(Italy) Alessandro Gai	SEAT Ibiza TDI	Accident		0
Retired SS15		144	(Italy) Demitri Brunelo	(Italy) Mitia Dotta	(Italy) Demitri Brunelo	SEAT Ibiza GTI 16V	Accident		0
Retired SS14		102	(United Kingdom) Paul Kirtley	(United Kingdom) David Jones	(United Kingdom) Paul Kirtley	Subaru Impreza	Accident		0
Retired SS12		32	(Sweden) Stig Blomqvist	(Venezuela) Ana Goñi	(Sweden) Stig Blomqvist	Mitsubishi Lancer Evo VI	Mechanical		0
Retired SS12		93	(United Kingdom) Arwyn Williams	(United Kingdom) Terry Moore	(United Kingdom) Arwyn Williams	Mitsubishi Lancer Evo	Mechanical		0
Retired SS12		95	(Sweden) Magnus Jansson	(Sweden) Thomas Fredriksson	(Sweden) Magnus Jansson	Mitsubishi Lancer Evo IV	Mechanical		0
Retired SS12		103	(United Kingdom) Peter Stephenson	(United Kingdom) Alan Whittaker	(United Kingdom) Peter Stephenson	Mitsubishi Lancer Evo	Mechanical		0
Retired SS11		54	(United Kingdom) Stuart Egglestone	(United Kingdom) Steve Egglestone	(United Kingdom) Stuart Egglestone	Mitsubishi Lancer Evo	Mechanical		0
Retired SS11		96	(United Kingdom) Steve Palmer	(United Kingdom) Bruce Harper	(United Kingdom) Steve Palmer	Mitsubishi Lancer Evo	Mechanical		0
Retired SS11		108	(United Kingdom) Miles Johnston	(United Kingdom) Mark Andrews	(United Kingdom) Miles Johnston	Vauxhall Astra GSI 16V	Mechanical		0
Retired SS11		124	(United Kingdom) Graeme Presswell	(United Kingdom) Martin Saunders	(United Kingdom) Graeme Presswell	Mitsubishi Lancer Evo III	Mechanical		0
Retired SS11		138	(United Kingdom) David Bateson	(United Kingdom) Daniel Barritt	(United Kingdom) David Bateson	Volkswagen Polo 16V	Mechanical		0
Retired SS11		148	(United Kingdom) Maurice Jellie	(United Kingdom) Peter Jolly	(United Kingdom) Maurice Jellie	Mitsubishi Lancer Evo	Accident		0
Retired SS10		80	(Sweden) Thorleif Granlöf	(Sweden) Christer Granlöf	(Sweden) Thorleif Granlöf	Mitsubishi Lancer Evo IV	Accident		0
Retired SS9		56	(Belgium) Pieter Tsjoen	(Belgium) Dany Colebunders	(Belgium) Pieter Tsjoen	Mitsubishi Lancer Evo VI	Mechanical		0
Retired SS9		61	(France) Fabrice Morel	(France) David Marty	(France) Fabrice Morel	Mitsubishi Lancer Evo VI	Excluded		0
Retired SS9		152	(France) Philippe Gobert	(France) Claude le Jean	(France) Philippe Gobert	Suzuki Swift GTi	Excluded		0
Retired SS8		69	(Netherlands) Johan Deen	(Netherlands) Harmen Scholtalbers	(Netherlands) Johan Deen	Mitsubishi Lancer Evo	Mechanical		0
Retired SS8		106	(United Kingdom) Tony Jardine	(United Kingdom) Des Kelly	(United Kingdom) Tony Jardine	Honda Integra Type-R DC2	Mechanical		0
Retired SS8		135	(United Kingdom) Harry Dodd	(United Kingdom) Roy Campbell	(United Kingdom) Harry Dodd	Subaru Impreza WRX	Mechanical		0
Retired SS8		155	(United Kingdom) David Beesley	(United Kingdom) Derrick Ramsdall	(United Kingdom) David Beesley	Vauxhall Corsa B GSI	Mechanical		0
Retired SS7		86	(United Kingdom) Mark Worley	(United Kingdom) David Gamblin	(United Kingdom) Mark Worley	Mitsubishi Lancer Evo	Accident		0
Retired SS7		120	(United Kingdom) John Lloyd	(United Kingdom) Paul Amandini	(United Kingdom) John Lloyd	Subaru Impreza	Electrical		0
Retired SS5		115	(United Kingdom) Jeff Williams	(United Kingdom) Stewart Foley	(United Kingdom) Jeff Williams	Mitsubishi Lancer Evo	Mechanical		0
Retired SS4		101	(United Kingdom) Edward Roberts	(United Kingdom) Gary Hunter	(United Kingdom) Edward Roberts	Mitsubishi Lancer Evo	Mechanical		0
Retired SS4		145	(United Kingdom) Sabrina Shaw	(United Kingdom) Ian Bevan	(United Kingdom) Sabrina Shaw	Subaru Impreza	Mechanical		0
Retired SS3		66	(United Kingdom) Richard Davis	(United Kingdom) David Williams	(United Kingdom) Richard Davis	Mitsubishi Lancer Evo	Mechanical		0
Retired SS3		112	(United Kingdom) Leon Pesticcio	(United Kingdom) Mark Jones	(United Kingdom) Leon Pesticcio	Mitsubishi Lancer Evo	Mechanical		0
Retired SS2		68	(Netherlands) Peter Bijvelds	(Netherlands) Piet Bijvelds	(Netherlands) Peter Bijvelds	Mitsubishi Lancer Evo VI	Mechanical		0
Retired SS2		100	(Italy) Luca Betti	(Italy) Paolo Del Grande	(Italy) Luca Betti	Renault Clio 16S	Mechanical		0
Retired SS2		111	(Italy) Davide Catania	(Italy) Federico Vescarelli	(Italy) Davide Catania	Mitsubishi Lancer Evo V	Mechanical		0

==== Special stages ====
Day	Stage	Stage name	Length	Winner	Car	Time	Class leader
23 Nov	SS1	Cardiff 1	2.43 km	(Austria) Manfred Stohl	Mitsubishi Lancer Evo VI	2:23.8	(Austria) Manfred Stohl
24 Nov	SS2	St. Gwynno	13.67 km	(Austria) Manfred Stohl	Mitsubishi Lancer Evo VI	7:27.1	(Austria) Manfred Stohl
24 Nov	SS3	Tyle	10.58 km	(Austria) Manfred Stohl	Mitsubishi Lancer Evo VI	6:23.5	(Austria) Manfred Stohl
24 Nov	SS4	Rhondda 1	26.47 km	(Austria) Manfred Stohl	Mitsubishi Lancer Evo VI	16:03.7	(Austria) Manfred Stohl
24 Nov	SS5	Crychan	15.57 km	(Austria) Manfred Stohl	Mitsubishi Lancer Evo VI	9:57.9	(Austria) Manfred Stohl
24 Nov	SS6	Halfway	17.45 km	(Austria) Manfred Stohl	Mitsubishi Lancer Evo VI	11:04.3	(Austria) Manfred Stohl
24 Nov	SS7	Hafren Sweet Lamb	27.23 km	(Austria) Manfred Stohl	Mitsubishi Lancer Evo VI	18:56.1	(Austria) Manfred Stohl
24 Nov	SS8	Myherin	16.79 km	(Austria) Manfred Stohl	Mitsubishi Lancer Evo VI	11:04.7	(Austria) Manfred Stohl
25 Nov	SS9	Rhondda 2	26.47 km	(Austria) Manfred Stohl	Mitsubishi Lancer Evo VI	16:08.1	(Austria) Manfred Stohl
25 Nov	SS10	Rheola 1	31.47 km	(Austria) Manfred Stohl	Mitsubishi Lancer Evo VI	19:37.4	(Austria) Manfred Stohl
25 Nov	SS11	Resolfen	46.45 km	(Austria) Manfred Stohl	Mitsubishi Lancer Evo VI	27:51.8	(Austria) Manfred Stohl
25 Nov	SS12	Rheola 2	31:47 km	(Peru) Ramón Ferreyros	Mitsubishi Lancer Evo VI	19:42.8	(Austria) Manfred Stohl
25 Nov	SS13	Margam 1	28.13 km	(Sweden) Kenneth Bäcklund	Mitsubishi Lancer Evo VI	19:25.5	(Austria) Manfred Stohl
25 Nov	SS14	Cardiff 2	2.43 km	(United Kingdom) Guy Anderson	Mitsubishi Lancer Evo VI	2:30.0	(Austria) Manfred Stohl
26 Nov	SS15	Brechfa	29.80 km	(Sweden) Pernilla Walfridsson-Solberg	Mitsubishi Lancer Evo VI	19:24.7	(Austria) Manfred Stohl
26 Nov	SS16	Trawscoed	26.62 km	(United Kingdom) Gavin Cox	Mitsubishi Lancer Evo VI	18:05.5	(Austria) Manfred Stohl
26 Nov	SS17	Margam 2	28.13 km	(Sweden) Pernilla Walfridsson-Solberg	Mitsubishi Lancer Evo VI	18:53.9	(Austria) Manfred Stohl

==== Championship standings ====
Pos.	Drivers' championships		
Pos.	Move	Driver	Points
1		(Austria) Manfred Stohl	75
2		(Uruguay) Gustavo Trelles	64
3		(Argentina) Gabriel Pozzo	22
4		(Finland) Jani Paasonen	21
5		(Argentina) Claudio Marcelo Menzi	17
