= 2001 Rally GB =

Rally car race

2001 Rally GB 57th Network Q Rally of Great Britain
Round 14 of the 2001 World Rally Championship season
← Previous event
- Host country: United Kingdom
- Rally base: Cardiff
- Dates run: November 22, 2001 – November 25, 2001
- Stages: 17 (380.86 km; 236.66 miles)
- Stage surface: Gravel
- Overall distance: 1,688.51 km (1,049.19 miles)

Statistics
- Crews: 117 at start, 50 at finish

Overall results
- Overall winner: (Finland) Marcus Grönholm (Finland) Timo Rautiainen (France) Peugeot Total; Peugeot 206 WRC

The 2001 Rally GB (formally the 57th Network Q Rally of Great Britain) was the fourteenth and final round of the 2001 World Rally Championship. The race was held over four days between 22 November and 25 November 2001, and was won by Peugeot's Marcus Grönholm, his 7th win in the World Rally Championship.

It also staged a deciding 3-way Championship battle between Colin McRae, Tommi Mäkinen and Richard Burns: during leg 1 Mäkinen lost a wheel and McRae crashed; whilst Burns eventually finished the rally in 3rd place and, with it, the 4 points needed to secure his first World Championship.

== Background ==
=== Entry list ===
No.	Driver	Co-Driver	Entrant	Car	Tyre
World Rally Championship manufacturer entries
1	(Finland) Marcus Grönholm	(Finland) Timo Rautiainen	(France) Peugeot Total	Peugeot 206 WRC	M
3	(Spain) Carlos Sainz	(Spain) Luis Moya	(United Kingdom) Ford Motor Co. Ltd.	Ford Focus RS WRC '01	P
4	(United Kingdom) Colin McRae	(United Kingdom) Nicky Grist	(United Kingdom) Ford Motor Co. Ltd.	Ford Focus RS WRC '01	P
5	(United Kingdom) Richard Burns	(United Kingdom) Robert Reid	(Japan) Subaru World Rally Team	Subaru Impreza S7 WRC '01	P
6	(Norway) Petter Solberg	(United Kingdom) Phil Mills	(Japan) Subaru World Rally Team	Subaru Impreza S7 WRC '01	P
7	(Finland) Tommi Mäkinen	(Finland) Kaj Lindström	(Japan) Marlboro Mitsubishi Ralliart	Mitsubishi Lancer WRC	M
8	(Belgium) Freddy Loix	(Belgium) Sven Smeets	(Japan) Marlboro Mitsubishi Ralliart	Mitsubishi Lancer WRC	M
9	(Sweden) Kenneth Eriksson	(Sweden) Staffan Parmander	(South Korea) Hyundai Castrol World Rally Team	Hyundai Accent WRC2	M
10	(United Kingdom) Alister McRae	(United Kingdom) David Senior	(South Korea) Hyundai Castrol World Rally Team	Hyundai Accent WRC2	M
11	(Germany) Armin Schwarz	(Germany) Manfred Hiemer	(Czech Republic) Škoda Motorsport	Škoda Octavia WRC Evo2	M
12	(Belgium) Bruno Thiry	(Belgium) Stéphane Prévot	(Czech Republic) Škoda Motorsport	Škoda Octavia WRC Evo2	M
16	(Finland) Harri Rovanperä	(Finland) Risto Pietiläinen	(France) Peugeot Total	Peugeot 206 WRC	M
World Rally Championship entries
2	(France) Didier Auriol	(France) Denis Giraudet	(France) Peugeot Total	Peugeot 206 WRC	M
17	(United Kingdom) Mark Higgins	(United Kingdom) Bryan Thomas	(United Kingdom) Ford Motor Co. Ltd.	Ford Focus RS WRC '01	P
18	(Estonia) Markko Märtin	(United Kingdom) Michael Park	(Japan) Subaru World Rally Team	Subaru Impreza S7 WRC '01	P
19	(Italy) Piero Liatti	(Italy) Carlo Cassina	(South Korea) Hyundai Castrol World Rally Team	Hyundai Accent WRC2	M
20	(Czech Republic) Roman Kresta	(Czech Republic) Jan Tománek	(Czech Republic) Škoda Motorsport	Škoda Octavia WRC Evo2	M
21	(Japan) Toshihiro Arai	(New Zealand) Tony Sircombe	(Japan) Subaru World Rally Team	Subaru Impreza S7 WRC '01	P
22	(France) Gilles Panizzi	(France) Hervé Panizzi	(France) H.F. Grifone SRL	Peugeot 206 WRC	M
23	(Finland) Janne Tuohino	(Finland) Petri Vihavainen	(United Kingdom) LMP Group Ltd	Toyota Corolla WRC	—N/a
24	(United Kingdom) Gwyndaf Evans	(United Kingdom) Chris Patterson	(Spain) SEAT Sport	SEAT Córdoba WRC Evo3	P
25	(Norway) Henning Solberg	(Norway) Cato Menkerud	(Norway) Henning Solberg	Subaru Impreza S5 WRC '98	M
26	(Belgium) Grégoire de Mevius	(France) Jack Boyère	(Belgium) Peugeot Team Bel-Lux	Peugeot 206 WRC	M
29	(United Kingdom) Neil Wearden	(United Kingdom) Trevor Agnew	(United Kingdom) Neil Wearden	Subaru Impreza S7 WRC '01	P
33	(Netherlands) Mark Breijer	(Netherlands) Hans van Goor	(Netherlands) Mark Breijer	Subaru Impreza S5 WRC '98	M
34	(Greece) Ioannis Papadimitriou	(United Kingdom) Allan Harryman	(Greece) Ioannis Papadimitriou	Subaru Impreza 555	M
36	(United Kingdom) Steve Petch	(United Kingdom) John Richardson	(United Kingdom) Steve Petch	Hyundai Accent WRC	—N/a
37	(United Kingdom) Peter Littler	(United Kingdom) Andy Marchbank	(United Kingdom) Peter Littler	Hyundai Accent WRC	M
40	(Spain) Txus Jaio	(Spain) Lucas Cruz	(Spain) Carlos Sainz Junior Team	Ford Focus WRC '00	—N/a
44	(United Kingdom) Glyn Jones	(United Kingdom) Huw Lewis	(United Kingdom) Glyn Jones	Subaru Impreza S5 WRC '99	M
45	(United Kingdom) Brian Bell	(United Kingdom) Paul Spooner	(United Kingdom) Brian Bell	Ford Focus WRC '00	M
74	(Republic of Ireland) Eamonn Boland	(Republic of Ireland) Anthony Nestor	(Republic of Ireland) Eamonn Boland	Subaru Impreza S5 WRC '99	—N/a
77	(United Kingdom) Derek McGarrity	(Republic of Ireland) Dermot O'Gorman	(United Kingdom) Derek McGarrity	Subaru Impreza S5 WRC '99	—N/a
79	(United Kingdom) Theo Bengry	(United Kingdom) Les Forsbrook	(United Kingdom) Theo Bengry	Subaru Impreza 555	—N/a
84	(United Kingdom) Robert Ceen	(United Kingdom) Alistair Douglas	(United Kingdom) Robert Ceen	Subaru Impreza 555	—N/a
89	(United Kingdom) Julian Reynolds	(United Kingdom) Ieuan Thomas	(United Kingdom) Julian Reynolds	Subaru Impreza 555	—N/a
90	(United Kingdom) Stephen Harron	(United Kingdom) Philip McCrea	(United Kingdom) Stephen Harron	Subaru Impreza 555	—N/a
93	(United Kingdom) Charles Payne	(United Kingdom) Ian Allsop	(United Kingdom) Charles Payne	Mitsubishi Lancer Evo V	P
95	(United Kingdom) Peter Stephenson	(United Kingdom) Allan Whittaker	(United Kingdom) Peter Stephenson	Subaru Impreza S5 WRC '97	—N/a
Group N Cup entries
28	(Sweden) Kenneth Bäcklund	(Sweden) Tord Andersson	(Sweden) Kenneth Bäcklund	Mitsubishi Lancer Evo VI	—N/a
31	(Sweden) Stig Blomqvist	(Venezuela) Ana Goñi	(United Kingdom) David Sutton Cars Ltd	Mitsubishi Lancer Evo VI	M
38	(United Kingdom) David Higgins	(United Kingdom) Craig Thorley	(United Kingdom) David Higgins	Subaru Impreza WRX	—N/a
39	(United Kingdom) Mike Brown Sr.	(United Kingdom) Aled Davies	(United Kingdom) Mike Brown Sr.	Mitsubishi Lancer Evo	—N/a
41	(Peru) Ramón Ferreyros	(Mexico) Javier Marín	(Peru) Ramón Ferreyros	Mitsubishi Lancer Evo VI	—N/a
42	(New Zealand) Reece Jones	(New Zealand) Leo Bult	(New Zealand) Reece Jones	Mitsubishi Lancer Evo VI	F
43	(United Kingdom) Gavin Cox	(United Kingdom) Tim Hobbs	(United Kingdom) Gavin Cox	Mitsubishi Lancer Evo VII	—N/a
46	(Netherlands) Peter Bijvelds	(Netherlands) Piet Bijvelds	(Netherlands) Peter Bijvelds	Mitsubishi Lancer Evo 6.5	—N/a
47	(United Kingdom) Jeremy Easson	(United Kingdom) Nigel Gardner	(United Kingdom) Jeremy Easson	Mitsubishi Lancer Evo VII	—N/a
48	(Sweden) Oscar Svedlund	(Sweden) Björn Nilsson	(Sweden) Oscar Svedlund	Mitsubishi Lancer Evo VI	—N/a
49	(Belgium) David Sterckx	(Belgium) André Leyh	(Belgium) David Sterckx	Mitsubishi Lancer Evo VI	—N/a
75	(United Kingdom) Nik Elsmore	(United Kingdom) Jayson Brown	(United Kingdom) Nik Elsmore	Mitsubishi Lancer Evo VI	—N/a
82	(United Kingdom) Alistair Ginley	(United Kingdom) Andrew Bargery	(United Kingdom) Alistair Ginley	Mitsubishi Lancer Evo VI	—N/a
83	(United Kingdom) Richard Davis	(United Kingdom) David Williams	(United Kingdom) Richard Davis	Mitsubishi Lancer Evo	—N/a
85	(United Kingdom) Leon Pesticcio	(United Kingdom) Howard Davies	(United Kingdom) Leon Pesticcio	Mitsubishi Lancer Evo VI	—N/a
86	(Italy) Riccardo Errani	(Italy) Stefano Casadio	(Italy) Riccardo Errani	Mitsubishi Lancer Evo VI	—N/a
87	(United Kingdom) Neil Buckley	(United Kingdom) Douglas Redpath	(United Kingdom) Neil Buckley	Mitsubishi Lancer Evo	—N/a
88	(United Kingdom) Oliver Clark	(United Kingdom) Richard Pashley	(United Kingdom) David Sutton Cars Ltd	Mitsubishi Lancer Evo	—N/a
91	(United Kingdom) Robert Swann	(United Kingdom) Ken Bowman	(United Kingdom) Robert Swann	Mitsubishi Lancer Evo	—N/a
94	(United Kingdom) Anthony Willmington	(United Kingdom) Andrew White	(United Kingdom) Anthony Willmington	Mitsubishi Lancer Evo	—N/a
96	(United Kingdom) Simon Redhead	(United Kingdom) Alan Thomas	(United Kingdom) Simon Redhead	Subaru Impreza	—N/a
97	(San Marino) Mirco Baldacci	(Italy) Maurizio Barone	(San Marino) Mirco Baldacci	Mitsubishi Lancer Evo VI	—N/a
98	(United Kingdom) Steve Head	(United Kingdom) Andrew Dugdale	(United Kingdom) Steve Head	Mitsubishi Lancer Evo	—N/a
99	(Belgium) Bob Colsoul	(Belgium) Tom Colsoul	(Belgium) Bob Colsoul	Mitsubishi Lancer Evo VI	—N/a
100	(United Kingdom) Natalie Barratt	(New Zealand) Roger Freeman	(United Kingdom) Natalie Barratt Rallysport	Mitsubishi Lancer Evo VI	—N/a
101	(United Kingdom) Andrew Haddon	(United Kingdom) Mark Solloway	(United Kingdom) Andrew Haddon	Mitsubishi Lancer Evo	—N/a
102	(Netherlands) Ries Huisman	(Netherlands) Edwin Abbring	(Netherlands) Ries Huisman	Mitsubishi Lancer Evo	—N/a
103	(United Kingdom) Don Whitehurst	(United Kingdom) Terry Atherton	(United Kingdom) Don Whitehurst	Subaru Impreza	—N/a
104	(France) Patrick Postillon	(France) Bruno Ceccarelli	(France) Patrick Postillon	Mitsubishi Lancer Evo	—N/a
105	(United Kingdom) Mark Winkles	(United Kingdom) Noel Waugh	(United Kingdom) Mark Winkles	Mitsubishi Lancer Evo	—N/a
106	(Italy) Fabio Frisiero	(Italy) Loris Roggia	(Italy) Fabio Frisiero	Mitsubishi Lancer Evo VI	—N/a
107	(United Kingdom) Paul Bird	(United Kingdom) Larry Carter	(United Kingdom) Paul Bird	Subaru Impreza	—N/a
108	(Netherlands) Maurice Huisman	(Netherlands) Jeroen van der Zalm	(Netherlands) Maurice Huisman	Mitsubishi Lancer Evo	—N/a
110	(Italy) Simone De Martini	(Italy) Tiziano Siviero	(Italy) Simone De Martini	Mitsubishi Lancer Evo	—N/a
115	(United Kingdom) David Bagshaw	(United Kingdom) John Roberts	(United Kingdom) David Bagshaw	Mitsubishi Lancer Evo VI	—N/a
116	(United Kingdom) Jeremy Nolan	(United Kingdom) Paul Nolan	(United Kingdom) Jeremy Nolan	Mitsubishi Lancer Evo	—N/a
117	(United Kingdom) Mike Harris	(United Kingdom) Paul Newman	(United Kingdom) Mike Harris	Mitsubishi Lancer Evo	—N/a
119	(United Kingdom) Graeme Presswell	(United Kingdom) Martin Saunders	(United Kingdom) Graeme Presswell	Mitsubishi Lancer Evo	—N/a
120	(United Kingdom) Simon Thomas	(United Kingdom) Liz Jordan	(United Kingdom) Simon Thomas	Peugeot 306 GTI	—N/a
122	(Germany) Andreas Mansfeld	(Germany) Gerd Ottenburger	(Germany) Andreas Mansfeld	Honda Integra Type-R DC2	—N/a
125	(United Kingdom) Tony Jardine	(United Kingdom) Kevin Eason	(United Kingdom) Tony Jardine	Honda Integra Type-R	—N/a
126	(Sweden) Magnus Jansson	(Sweden) Thomas Fredriksson	(Sweden) Magnus Jansson	Mitsubishi Lancer Evo	—N/a
129	(United Kingdom) Martin Newcombe	(United Kingdom) Peter Newcombe	(United Kingdom) Martin Newcombe	Honda Civic VTi (EK4)	—N/a
130	(Netherlands) Patrick van Empel	(Netherlands) Radboud van Hoek	(Netherlands) Patrick van Empel	Mitsubishi Lancer Evo V	—N/a
Super 1600 Cup entries
50	(Austria) Manfred Stohl	(Austria) Ilka Minor	(Italy) Top Run SRL	Fiat Punto S1600	M
51	(France) Patrick Magaud	(France) Guylène Brun	(United Kingdom) Ford Motor Co. Ltd.	Ford Puma S1600	M
52	(Italy) Andrea Dallavilla	(Italy) Giovanni Bernacchini	(Italy) R&D Motorsport	Fiat Punto S1600	M
53	(France) Sébastien Loeb	(Monaco) Daniel Elena	(France) Citroën Sport	Citroën Saxo S1600	M
54	(Belgium) Larry Cols	(Belgium) Dany Colebunders	(Belgium) Peugeot Bastos Racing	Peugeot 206 S1600	M
55	(United Kingdom) Niall McShea	(United Kingdom) Michael Orr	(France) Citroën Sport	Citroën Saxo S1600	M
56	(Italy) Giandomenico Basso	(Italy) Flavio Guglielmini	(Italy) Top Run SRL	Fiat Punto S1600	M
57	(France) Cédric Robert	(France) Gérald Bedon	(France) Team Gamma	Peugeot 206 S1600	M
58	(Spain) Sergio Vallejo	(Spain) Diego Vallejo	(Spain) Pronto Racing	Fiat Punto S1600	M
59	(France) Benoît Rousselot	(France) Gilles Mondésir	(United Kingdom) Ford Motor Co. Ltd.	Ford Puma S1600	M
61	(Italy) Corrado Fontana	(Italy) Renzo Casazza	(Italy) H.F. Grifone SRL	Peugeot 206 S1600	M
62	(Finland) Jussi Välimäki	(Finland) Jakke Honkanen	(Finland) ST Motors	Peugeot 206 S1600	M
63	(Norway) Martin Stenshorne	(United Kingdom) Clive Jenkins	(Norway) Zeta Racing	Ford Puma S1600	M
64	(Italy) Massimo Macaluso	(Italy) Antonio Celot	(Italy) R&D Motorsport	Fiat Punto S1600	M
65	(Paraguay) Alejandro Galanti	(Spain) Xavier Amigó	(Italy) Astra Racing	Ford Puma S1600	M
67	(Andorra) Albert Llovera	(Spain) Marc Corral	(Spain) Pronto Racing	Fiat Punto S1600	M
68	(Italy) Massimo Ceccato	(Italy) Mitia Dotta	(Italy) Hawk Racing Club	Fiat Punto S1600	M
69	(France) Nicolas Bernardi	(France) Bruno Brissart	(France) Team Gamma	Peugeot 206 S1600	M
71	(Belgium) François Duval	(Belgium) Jean-Marc Fortin	(United Kingdom) Ford Motor Co. Ltd.	Ford Puma S1600	M
72	(Malaysia) Saladin Mazlan	(United Kingdom) Timothy Sturla	(Malaysia) Saladin Rallying	Citroën Saxo S1600	M
73	(Italy) Christian Chemin	(Italy) Simone Scattolin	(Italy) Hawk Racing Club	Fiat Punto S1600	M

=== Itinerary ===
All dates and times are GMT (UTC±0).

Date	Time	No.	Stage name	Distance
Leg 1 — 139.71 km
22 November	19:10	SS1	Cardiff Super 1	2.45 km
23 November	08:26	SS2	St. Gwynno	13.67 km
23 November	08:53	SS3	Tyle	10.55 km
23 November	09:29	SS4	Rhondda 1	26.47 km
23 November	12:40	SS5	Crychan	13.06 km
23 November	13:04	SS6	Halfway	17.45 km
23 November	16:03	SS7	Brechfa 1	29.80 km
23 November	16:51	SS8	Trawscoed 1	26.26 km
Leg 2 — 132.89 km
24 November	08:55	SS9	Resolfen	46.45 km
24 November	11:23	SS10	Margam 1	27.93 km
24 November	13:53	SS11	Brechfa 2	29.80 km
24 November	14:41	SS12	Trawscoed 2	26.26 km
24 November	19:10	SS13	Cardiff Super 2	2.45 km
Leg 3 — 108.26 km
25 November	07:58	SS14	Rheola 1	26.93 km
25 November	09:42	SS15	Rhondda 2	26.47 km
25 November	12:18	SS16	Rheola 2	26.93 km
25 November	13:36	SS17	Margam 2	27.93 km

== Results ==
=== Overall ===
Pos.	No.	Driver	Co-driver	Team	Car	Time	Difference	Points
1	1	(Finland) Marcus Grönholm	(Finland) Timo Rautiainen	(France) Peugeot Total	Peugeot 206 WRC	3:23:44.8		10
2	16	(Finland) Harri Rovanperä	(Finland) Risto Pietiläinen	(France) Peugeot Total	Peugeot 206 WRC	3:26:11.9	+2:27.1	6
3	5	(United Kingdom) Richard Burns	(United Kingdom) Robert Reid	(Japan) Subaru World Rally Team	Subaru Impreza S7 WRC '01	3:27:00.2	+3:15.4	4
4	10	(United Kingdom) Alister McRae	(United Kingdom) David Senior	(South Korea) Hyundai Castrol World Rally Team	Hyundai Accent WRC2	3:30:33.6	+6:48.8	3
5	11	(Germany) Armin Schwarz	(Germany) Manfred Hiemer	(Czech Republic) Škoda Motorsport	Škoda Octavia WRC Evo2	3:31:16.1	+7:31.3	2
6	9	(Sweden) Kenneth Eriksson	(Sweden) Staffan Parmander	(South Korea) Hyundai Castrol World Rally Team	Hyundai Accent WRC2	3:31:55.8	+8:11.0	1

=== World Rally Cars ===
==== Classification ====
Position		No.	Driver	Co-driver	Entrant	Car	Time	Difference	Points
Event	Class	No.	Driver	Co-driver	Entrant	Car	Time	Difference	Points
1	1	1	(Finland) Marcus Grönholm	(Finland) Timo Rautiainen	(France) Peugeot Total	Peugeot 206 WRC	3:23:44.8		10
2	2	16	(Finland) Harri Rovanperä	(Finland) Risto Pietiläinen	(France) Peugeot Total	Peugeot 206 WRC	3:26:11.9	+2:27.1	6
3	3	5	(United Kingdom) Richard Burns	(United Kingdom) Robert Reid	(Japan) Subaru World Rally Team	Subaru Impreza S7 WRC '01	3:27:00.2	+3:15.4	4
4	4	10	(United Kingdom) Alister McRae	(United Kingdom) David Senior	(South Korea) Hyundai Castrol World Rally Team	Hyundai Accent WRC2	3:30:33.6	+6:48.8	3
5	5	11	(Germany) Armin Schwarz	(Germany) Manfred Hiemer	(Czech Republic) Škoda Motorsport	Škoda Octavia WRC Evo2	3:31:16.1	+7:31.3	2
6	6	9	(Sweden) Kenneth Eriksson	(Sweden) Staffan Parmander	(South Korea) Hyundai Castrol World Rally Team	Hyundai Accent WRC2	3:31:55.8	+8:11.0	1
8	7	12	(Belgium) Bruno Thiry	(Belgium) Stéphane Prévot	(Czech Republic) Škoda Motorsport	Škoda Octavia WRC Evo2	3:34:40.4	+10:55.6	0
Retired SS11		3	(Spain) Carlos Sainz	(Spain) Luis Moya	(United Kingdom) Ford Motor Co. Ltd.	Ford Focus RS WRC '01	Spectator injury		0
Retired SS10		8	(Belgium) Freddy Loix	(Belgium) Sven Smeets	(Japan) Marlboro Mitsubishi Ralliart	Mitsubishi Lancer WRC	Transmission		0
Retired SS4		4	(United Kingdom) Colin McRae	(United Kingdom) Nicky Grist	(United Kingdom) Ford Motor Co. Ltd.	Ford Focus RS WRC '01	Accident		0
Retired SS2		6	(Norway) Petter Solberg	(United Kingdom) Phil Mills	(Japan) Subaru World Rally Team	Subaru Impreza S7 WRC '01	Mechanical		0
Retired SS2		7	(Finland) Tommi Mäkinen	(Finland) Kaj Lindström	(Japan) Marlboro Mitsubishi Ralliart	Mitsubishi Lancer WRC	Lost wheel		0

==== Special stages ====
Day	Stage	Stage name	Length	Winner	Car	Time	Class leaders
Leg 1 (22 Nov)	SS1	Cardiff Super 1	2.45 km	(United Kingdom) Colin McRae	Ford Focus RS WRC '01	2:10.1	(United Kingdom) Colin McRae
Leg 1 (23 Nov)	SS2	St. Gwynno	13.67 km	(United Kingdom) Colin McRae	Ford Focus RS WRC '01	6:34.7	(United Kingdom) Colin McRae
Leg 1 (23 Nov)	SS3	Tyle	10.55 km	(Finland) Marcus Grönholm	Peugeot 206 WRC	5:41.9	(United Kingdom) Colin McRae
Leg 1 (23 Nov)	SS4	Rhondda 1	26.47 km	(Finland) Marcus Grönholm	Peugeot 206 WRC	14:09.3	(Finland) Marcus Grönholm
Leg 1 (23 Nov)	SS5	Crychan	13.06 km	(Finland) Marcus Grönholm	Peugeot 206 WRC	7:17.2	(Finland) Marcus Grönholm
Leg 1 (23 Nov)	SS6	Halfway	17.45 km	(Finland) Marcus Grönholm	Peugeot 206 WRC	10:00.1	(Finland) Marcus Grönholm
Leg 1 (23 Nov)	SS7	Brechfa 1	29.80 km	(Finland) Marcus Grönholm	Peugeot 206 WRC	17:23.0	(Finland) Marcus Grönholm
Leg 1 (23 Nov)	SS8	Trawscoed 1	26.26 km	(Finland) Harri Rovanperä	Peugeot 206 WRC	16:51.9	(Finland) Marcus Grönholm
Leg 2 (24 Nov)	SS9	Resolfen	46.45 km	(Finland) Marcus Grönholm	Peugeot 206 WRC	25:28.1	(Finland) Marcus Grönholm
Leg 2 (24 Nov)	SS10	Margam 1	27.93 km	(Finland) Marcus Grönholm	Peugeot 206 WRC	16:26.2	(Finland) Marcus Grönholm
Leg 2 (24 Nov)	SS11	Brechfa 2	29.80 km	(Finland) Marcus Grönholm	Peugeot 206 WRC	17:12.1	(Finland) Marcus Grönholm
Leg 2 (24 Nov)	SS12	Trawscoed 2	26.26 km	Stage cancelled			(Finland) Marcus Grönholm
Leg 2 (24 Nov)	SS13	Cardiff Super 2	2.45 km	(United Kingdom) Alister McRae	Hyundai Accent WRC2	2:11.3	(Finland) Marcus Grönholm
Leg 3 (25 Nov)	SS14	Rheola 1	26.93 km	(Finland) Marcus Grönholm	Peugeot 206 WRC	15:36.8	(Finland) Marcus Grönholm
Leg 3 (25 Nov)	SS15	Rhondda 2	26.47 km	(Finland) Marcus Grönholm	Peugeot 206 WRC	14:31.6	(Finland) Marcus Grönholm
Leg 3 (25 Nov)	SS16	Rheola 2	26.93 km	(Finland) Marcus Grönholm	Peugeot 206 WRC	15:23.6	(Finland) Marcus Grönholm
Leg 3 (25 Nov)	SS17	Margam 2	27.93 km	(Finland) Marcus Grönholm	Peugeot 206 WRC	16:30.0	(Finland) Marcus Grönholm

==== Championship standings ====
- **Bold text** indicates 2001 World Champions.

Pos.	Drivers' championships			Co-drivers' championships			Manufacturers' championships		
Pos.	Move	Driver	Points	Move	Co-driver	Points	Move	Manufacturer	Points
1	2	(United Kingdom) **Richard Burns**	44	2	(United Kingdom) **Robert Reid**	44		(France) **Peugeot Total**	106
2	1	(United Kingdom) Colin McRae	42	1	(United Kingdom) Nicky Grist	42		(United Kingdom) Ford Motor Co. Ltd.	86
3	1	(Finland) Tommi Mäkinen	41	1	(Finland) Risto Mannisenmäki	40		(Japan) Marlboro Mitsubishi Ralliart	69
4	2	(Finland) Marcus Grönholm	36	2	(Finland) Timo Rautiainen	36		(Japan) Subaru World Rally Team	66
5		(Finland) Harri Rovanperä	36		(Finland) Risto Pietiläinen	36		(Czech Republic) Škoda Motorsport	17

=== FIA Cup for Production Rally Drivers ===
==== Classification ====
Position		No.	Driver	Co-driver	Entrant	Car	Time	Difference	Points
Event	Class	No.	Driver	Co-driver	Entrant	Car	Time	Difference	Points
11	1	38	(United Kingdom) David Higgins	(United Kingdom) Craig Thorley	(United Kingdom) David Higgins	Subaru Impreza WRX	3:44:56.7		10
12	2	41	(Peru) Ramón Ferreyros	(Mexico) Javier Marín	(Peru) Ramón Ferreyros	Mitsubishi Lancer Evo VI	3:44:59.5	+2.8	6
14	3	82	(United Kingdom) Alistair Ginley	(United Kingdom) Andrew Bargery	(United Kingdom) Alistair Ginley	Mitsubishi Lancer Evo VI	3:50:32.7	+5:36.0	4
16	4	31	(Sweden) Stig Blomqvist	(Venezuela) Ana Goñi	(United Kingdom) David Sutton Cars Ltd	Mitsubishi Lancer Evo VI	3:50:41.2	+5:44.5	3
19	5	46	(Netherlands) Peter Bijvelds	(Netherlands) Piet Bijvelds	(Netherlands) Peter Bijvelds	Mitsubishi Lancer Evo 6.5	3:57:57.2	+13:00.5	2
21	6	88	(United Kingdom) Oliver Clark	(United Kingdom) Richard Pashley	(United Kingdom) David Sutton Cars Ltd	Mitsubishi Lancer Evo	3:58:54.2	+13:57.5	1
23	7	42	(New Zealand) Reece Jones	(New Zealand) Leo Bult	(New Zealand) Reece Jones	Mitsubishi Lancer Evo VI	4:01:45.0	+16:48.3	0
24	8	87	(United Kingdom) Neil Buckley	(United Kingdom) Douglas Redpath	(United Kingdom) Neil Buckley	Mitsubishi Lancer Evo	4:03:04.7	+18:08.0	0
27	9	99	(Belgium) Bob Colsoul	(Belgium) Tom Colsoul	(Belgium) Bob Colsoul	Mitsubishi Lancer Evo VI	4:08:44.5	+23:47.8	0
32	10	104	(France) Patrick Postillon	(France) Bruno Ceccarelli	(France) Patrick Postillon	Mitsubishi Lancer Evo	4:11:17.5	+26:20.8	0
36	11	110	(Italy) Simone De Martini	(Italy) Tiziano Siviero	(Italy) Simone De Martini	Mitsubishi Lancer Evo	4:17:00.2	+32:03.5	0
37	12	117	(United Kingdom) Mike Harris	(United Kingdom) Paul Newman	(United Kingdom) Mike Harris	Mitsubishi Lancer Evo	4:17:36.0	+32:39.3	0
40	13	107	(United Kingdom) Paul Bird	(United Kingdom) Larry Carter	(United Kingdom) Paul Bird	Subaru Impreza	4:18:45.8	+33:49.1	0
41	14	108	(Netherlands) Maurice Huisman	(Netherlands) Jeroen van der Zalm	(Netherlands) Maurice Huisman	Mitsubishi Lancer Evo	4:19:46.3	+34:49.6	0
42	15	130	(Netherlands) Patrick van Empel	(Netherlands) Radboud van Hoek	(Netherlands) Patrick van Empel	Mitsubishi Lancer Evo V	4:20:26.8	+35:30.1	0
44	16	115	(United Kingdom) David Bagshaw	(United Kingdom) John Roberts	(United Kingdom) David Bagshaw	Mitsubishi Lancer Evo VI	4:24:01.7	+39:05.0	0
45	17	122	(Germany) Andreas Mansfeld	(Germany) Gerd Ottenburger	(Germany) Andreas Mansfeld	Honda Integra Type-R DC2	4:34:36.4	+49:39.7	0
46	18	119	(United Kingdom) Graeme Presswell	(United Kingdom) Martin Saunders	(United Kingdom) Graeme Presswell	Mitsubishi Lancer Evo	4:35:43.7	+50:47.0	0
47	19	125	(United Kingdom) Tony Jardine	(United Kingdom) Kevin Eason	(United Kingdom) Tony Jardine	Honda Integra Type-R	4:36:06.1	+51:09.4	0
48	20	102	(Netherlands) Ries Huisman	(Netherlands) Edwin Abbring	(Netherlands) Ries Huisman	Mitsubishi Lancer Evo	4:37:57.3	+53:00.6	0
49	21	129	(United Kingdom) Martin Newcombe	(United Kingdom) Peter Newcombe	(United Kingdom) Martin Newcombe	Honda Civic VTi (EK4)	4:43:05.5	+58:08.8	0
Retired SS17		28	(Sweden) Kenneth Bäcklund	(Sweden) Tord Andersson	(Sweden) Kenneth Bäcklund	Mitsubishi Lancer Evo VI	Mechanical		0
Retired SS17		85	(United Kingdom) Leon Pesticcio	(United Kingdom) Howard Davies	(United Kingdom) Leon Pesticcio	Mitsubishi Lancer Evo VI	Retired		0
Retired SS17		94	(United Kingdom) Anthony Willmington	(United Kingdom) Andrew White	(United Kingdom) Anthony Willmington	Mitsubishi Lancer Evo	Retired		0
Retired SS17		97	(San Marino) Mirco Baldacci	(Italy) Maurizio Barone	(San Marino) Mirco Baldacci	Mitsubishi Lancer Evo VI	Retired		0
Retired SS17		106	(Italy) Fabio Frisiero	(Italy) Loris Roggia	(Italy) Fabio Frisiero	Mitsubishi Lancer Evo VI	Retired		0
Retired SS15		91	(United Kingdom) Robert Swann	(United Kingdom) Ken Bowman	(United Kingdom) Robert Swann	Mitsubishi Lancer Evo	Retired		0
Retired SS15		105	(United Kingdom) Mark Winkles	(United Kingdom) Noel Waugh	(United Kingdom) Mark Winkles	Mitsubishi Lancer Evo	Oil pressure		0
Retired SS14		100	(United Kingdom) Natalie Barratt	(New Zealand) Roger Freeman	(United Kingdom) Natalie Barratt Rallysport	Mitsubishi Lancer Evo VI	Retired		0
Retired SS14		116	(United Kingdom) Jeremy Nolan	(United Kingdom) Paul Nolan	(United Kingdom) Jeremy Nolan	Mitsubishi Lancer Evo	Retired		0
Retired SS14		126	(Sweden) Magnus Jansson	(Sweden) Thomas Fredriksson	(Sweden) Magnus Jansson	Mitsubishi Lancer Evo	Fuel pump		0
Retired SS13		48	(Sweden) Oscar Svedlund	(Sweden) Björn Nilsson	(Sweden) Oscar Svedlund	Mitsubishi Lancer Evo VI	Transmission		0
Retired SS9		47	(United Kingdom) Jeremy Easson	(United Kingdom) Nigel Gardner	(United Kingdom) Jeremy Easson	Mitsubishi Lancer Evo VII	Retired		0
Retired SS9		83	(United Kingdom) Richard Davis	(United Kingdom) David Williams	(United Kingdom) Richard Davis	Mitsubishi Lancer Evo	Engine		0
Retired SS8		43	(United Kingdom) Gavin Cox	(United Kingdom) Tim Hobbs	(United Kingdom) Gavin Cox	Mitsubishi Lancer Evo VII	Accident		0
Retired SS8		98	(United Kingdom) Steve Head	(United Kingdom) Andrew Dugdale	(United Kingdom) Steve Head	Mitsubishi Lancer Evo	Transmission		0
Retired SS8		120	(United Kingdom) Simon Thomas	(United Kingdom) Liz Jordan	(United Kingdom) Simon Thomas	Peugeot 306 GTI	Accident		0
Retired SS5		49	(Belgium) David Sterckx	(Belgium) André Leyh	(Belgium) David Sterckx	Mitsubishi Lancer Evo VI	Mechanical		0
Retired SS4		96	(United Kingdom) Simon Redhead	(United Kingdom) Alan Thomas	(United Kingdom) Simon Redhead	Subaru Impreza	Engine		0
Retired SS3		103	(United Kingdom) Don Whitehurst	(United Kingdom) Terry Atherton	(United Kingdom) Don Whitehurst	Subaru Impreza	Mechanical		0
Retired SS2		39	(United Kingdom) Mike Brown Sr.	(United Kingdom) Aled Davies	(United Kingdom) Mike Brown Sr.	Mitsubishi Lancer Evo	Accident		0
Retired SS2		75	(United Kingdom) Nik Elsmore	(United Kingdom) Jayson Brown	(United Kingdom) Nik Elsmore	Mitsubishi Lancer Evo VI	Mechanical		0
Retired SS2		101	(United Kingdom) Andrew Haddon	(United Kingdom) Mark Solloway	(United Kingdom) Andrew Haddon	Mitsubishi Lancer Evo	Mechanical		0
Retired SS1		86	(Italy) Riccardo Errani	(Italy) Stefano Casadio	(Italy) Riccardo Errani	Mitsubishi Lancer Evo VI	Mechanical		0

==== Special stages ====
Day	Stage	Stage name	Length	Winner	Car	Time	Class leaders
Leg 1 (22 Nov)	SS1	Cardiff Super 1	2.45 km	(Sweden) Kenneth Bäcklund	Mitsubishi Lancer Evo VI	2:17.6	(Sweden) Kenneth Bäcklund
Leg 1 (23 Nov)	SS2	St. Gwynno	13.67 km	(Peru) Ramón Ferreyros	Mitsubishi Lancer Evo VI	7:19.2	(Sweden) Kenneth Bäcklund
Leg 1 (23 Nov)	SS3	Tyle	10.55 km	(United Kingdom) David Higgins	Subaru Impreza WRX	6:19.4	(United Kingdom) David Higgins
Leg 1 (23 Nov)	SS4	Rhondda 1	26.47 km	(Sweden) Kenneth Bäcklund	Mitsubishi Lancer Evo VI	15:38.0	(Sweden) Kenneth Bäcklund
Leg 1 (23 Nov)	SS5	Crychan	13.06 km	(United Kingdom) David Higgins	Subaru Impreza WRX	8:14.3	(Sweden) Kenneth Bäcklund
Leg 1 (23 Nov)	SS6	Halfway	17.45 km	(Peru) Ramón Ferreyros	Mitsubishi Lancer Evo VI	11:08.9	(Peru) Ramón Ferreyros
Leg 1 (23 Nov)	SS7	Brechfa 1	29.80 km	(Sweden) Kenneth Bäcklund	Mitsubishi Lancer Evo VI	20:10.3	(Sweden) Kenneth Bäcklund
Leg 1 (23 Nov)	SS8	Trawscoed 1	26.26 km	(Peru) Ramón Ferreyros	Mitsubishi Lancer Evo VI	18:38.9	(Peru) Ramón Ferreyros
Leg 2 (24 Nov)	SS9	Resolfen	46.45 km	(United Kingdom) David Higgins	Subaru Impreza WRX	28:03.3	(Peru) Ramón Ferreyros
Leg 2 (24 Nov)	SS10	Margam 1	27.93 km	(United Kingdom) David Higgins	Subaru Impreza WRX	18:17.7	(Peru) Ramón Ferreyros
Leg 2 (24 Nov)	SS11	Brechfa 2	29.80 km	Notional stage time			(Peru) Ramón Ferreyros
Leg 2 (24 Nov)	SS12	Trawscoed 2	26.26 km	Stage cancelled			(Peru) Ramón Ferreyros
Leg 2 (24 Nov)	SS13	Cardiff Super 2	2.45 km	(Sweden) Kenneth Bäcklund	Mitsubishi Lancer Evo VI	2:18.4	(Peru) Ramón Ferreyros
Leg 3 (25 Nov)	SS14	Rheola 1	26.93 km	(United Kingdom) David Higgins	Subaru Impreza WRX	16:49.9	(Peru) Ramón Ferreyros
Leg 3 (25 Nov)	SS15	Rhondda 2	26.47 km	(United Kingdom) David Higgins	Subaru Impreza WRX	15:47.9	(Peru) Ramón Ferreyros
Leg 3 (25 Nov)	SS16	Rheola 2	26.93 km	(United Kingdom) David Higgins	Subaru Impreza WRX	16:38.3	(United Kingdom) David Higgins
Leg 3 (25 Nov)	SS17	Margam 2	27.93 km	(United Kingdom) David Higgins	Subaru Impreza WRX	17:53.4	(United Kingdom) David Higgins

==== Championship standings ====
- **Bold text** indicates 2001 World Champions.

Pos.	Drivers' championships		
Pos.	Move	Driver	Points
1		(Argentina) **Gabriel Pozzo**	71
2		(Uruguay) Gustavo Trelles	36
3		(Austria) Manfred Stohl	23
4		(Argentina) Marcos Ligato	22
5		(Sweden) Stig Blomqvist	17

=== FIA Cup for Super 1600 Drivers ===
==== Classification ====
Position		No.	Driver	Co-driver	Entrant	Car	Time	Difference	Points
Event	Class	No.	Driver	Co-driver	Entrant	Car	Time	Difference	Points
15	1	53	(France) Sébastien Loeb	(Monaco) Daniel Elena	(France) Citroën Sport	Citroën Saxo S1600	3:50:37.3		10
17	2	55	(United Kingdom) Niall McShea	(United Kingdom) Michael Orr	(France) Citroën Sport	Citroën Saxo S1600	3:52:41.0	+2:03.7	6
22	3	54	(Belgium) Larry Cols	(Belgium) Dany Colebunders	(Belgium) Peugeot Bastos Racing	Peugeot 206 S1600	3:59:25.1	+8:47.8	4
26	4	65	(Paraguay) Alejandro Galanti	(Spain) Xavier Amigó	(Italy) Astra Racing	Ford Puma S1600	4:08:31.3	+17:54.0	3
28	5	72	(Malaysia) Saladin Mazlan	(United Kingdom) Timothy Sturla	(Malaysia) Saladin Rallying	Citroën Saxo S1600	4:09:29.8	+18:52.5	2
29	6	68	(Italy) Massimo Ceccato	(Italy) Mitia Dotta	(Italy) Hawk Racing Club	Fiat Punto S1600	4:09:42.4	+19:05.1	1
35	7	69	(France) Nicolas Bernardi	(France) Bruno Brissart	(France) Team Gamma	Peugeot 206 S1600	4:15:59.0	+25:21.7	0
43	8	73	(Italy) Christian Chemin	(Italy) Simone Scattolin	(Italy) Hawk Racing Club	Fiat Punto S1600	4:20:30.3	+29:53.0	0
Retired SS17		52	(Italy) Andrea Dallavilla	(Italy) Giovanni Bernacchini	(Italy) R&D Motorsport	Fiat Punto S1600	Engine		0
Retired SS17		67	(Andorra) Albert Llovera	(Spain) Marc Corral	(Spain) Pronto Racing	Fiat Punto S1600	Engine		0
Retired SS16		57	(France) Cédric Robert	(France) Gérald Bedon	(France) Team Gamma	Peugeot 206 S1600	Electrical		0
Retired SS15		63	(Norway) Martin Stenshorne	(United Kingdom) Clive Jenkins	(Norway) Zeta Racing	Ford Puma S1600	Suspension		0
Retired SS9		61	(Italy) Corrado Fontana	(Italy) Renzo Casazza	(Italy) H.F. Grifone SRL	Peugeot 206 S1600	Steering		0
Retired SS7		62	(Finland) Jussi Välimäki	(Finland) Jakke Honkanen	(Finland) ST Motors	Peugeot 206 S1600	Driveshaft		0
Retired SS6		56	(Italy) Giandomenico Basso	(Italy) Flavio Guglielmini	(Italy) Top Run SRL	Fiat Punto S1600	Engine		0
Retired SS4		50	(Austria) Manfred Stohl	(Austria) Ilka Minor	(Italy) Top Run SRL	Fiat Punto S1600	Accident		0
Retired SS4		51	(France) Patrick Magaud	(France) Guylène Brun	(United Kingdom) Ford Motor Co. Ltd.	Ford Puma S1600	Electrical		0
Retired SS4		58	(Spain) Sergio Vallejo	(Spain) Diego Vallejo	(Spain) Pronto Racing	Fiat Punto S1600	Accident		0
Retired SS4		71	(Belgium) François Duval	(Belgium) Jean-Marc Fortin	(United Kingdom) Ford Motor Co. Ltd.	Ford Puma S1600	Accident		0
Retired SS3		64	(Italy) Massimo Macaluso	(Italy) Antonio Celot	(Italy) R&D Motorsport	Fiat Punto S1600	Accident		0
Retired SS1		59	(France) Benoît Rousselot	(France) Gilles Mondésir	(United Kingdom) Ford Motor Co. Ltd.	Ford Puma S1600	Suspension		0

==== Special stages ====
Day	Stage	Stage name	Length	Winner	Car	Time	Class leaders
Leg 1 (22 Nov)	SS1	Cardiff Super 1	2.45 km	(France) Sébastien Loeb	Citroën Saxo S1600	2:17.6	(France) Sébastien Loeb
Leg 1 (23 Nov)	SS2	St. Gwynno	13.67 km	(Belgium) François Duval	Ford Puma S1600	7:19.2	(Belgium) François Duval
Leg 1 (23 Nov)	SS3	Tyle	10.55 km	(Belgium) François Duval	Ford Puma S1600	6:19.4	(Belgium) François Duval
Leg 1 (23 Nov)	SS4	Rhondda 1	26.47 km	(France) Sébastien Loeb	Citroën Saxo S1600	15:38.0	(France) Sébastien Loeb
Leg 1 (23 Nov)	SS5	Crychan	13.06 km	(Italy) Andrea Dallavilla	Fiat Punto S1600	8:14.3	(France) Sébastien Loeb
Leg 1 (23 Nov)	SS6	Halfway	17.45 km	(Italy) Andrea Dallavilla	Fiat Punto S1600	11:08.9	(France) Sébastien Loeb
Leg 1 (23 Nov)	SS7	Brechfa 1	29.80 km	(France) Sébastien Loeb	Citroën Saxo S1600	20:10.3	(France) Sébastien Loeb
Leg 1 (23 Nov)	SS8	Trawscoed 1	26.26 km	(France) Sébastien Loeb	Citroën Saxo S1600	18:38.9	(France) Sébastien Loeb
Leg 2 (24 Nov)	SS9	Resolfen	46.45 km	(France) Sébastien Loeb	Citroën Saxo S1600	28:03.3	(France) Sébastien Loeb
Leg 2 (24 Nov)	SS10	Margam 1	27.93 km	(United Kingdom) Niall McShea	Citroën Saxo S1600	18:17.7	(France) Sébastien Loeb
Leg 2 (24 Nov)	SS11	Brechfa 2	29.80 km	Notional stage time			(France) Sébastien Loeb
Leg 2 (24 Nov)	SS12	Trawscoed 2	26.26 km	Stage cancelled			(France) Sébastien Loeb
Leg 2 (24 Nov)	SS13	Cardiff Super 2	2.45 km	(Belgium) Larry Cols	Peugeot 206 S1600	2:18.4	(France) Sébastien Loeb
Leg 3 (25 Nov)	SS14	Rheola 1	26.93 km	(Italy) Andrea Dallavilla	Fiat Punto S1600	16:49.9	(France) Sébastien Loeb
Leg 3 (25 Nov)	SS15	Rhondda 2	26.47 km	(United Kingdom) Niall McShea	Citroën Saxo S1600	15:47.9	(France) Sébastien Loeb
Leg 3 (25 Nov)	SS16	Rheola 2	26.93 km	(Italy) Andrea Dallavilla	Fiat Punto S1600	16:38.3	(France) Sébastien Loeb
Leg 3 (25 Nov)	SS17	Margam 2	27.93 km	(United Kingdom) Niall McShea	Citroën Saxo S1600	17:53.4	(France) Sébastien Loeb

==== Championship standings ====
- **Bold text** indicates 2001 World Champions.

Pos.	Drivers' championships		
Pos.	Move	Driver	Points
1		(France) **Sébastien Loeb**	50
2		(Italy) Andrea Dallavilla	30
3	5	(United Kingdom) Niall McShea	12
4	1	(Belgium) Larry Cols	11
5	2	(Italy) Giandomenico Basso	10
