= 2002 Rally GB =

Rally car race

2002 Rally GB 58th Network Q Rally of Great Britain
Round 14 of the 2002 World Rally Championship season
← Previous event
- Host country: United Kingdom
- Rally base: Cardiff
- Dates run: November 14, 2002 – November 17, 2002
- Stages: 17 (390.57 km; 242.69 miles)
- Stage surface: Gravel
- Overall distance: 1,614.74 km (1,003.35 miles)

Statistics
- Crews: 85 at start, 38 at finish

Overall results
- Overall winner: (Norway) Petter Solberg (United Kingdom) Phil Mills (Japan) 555 Subaru World Rally Team; Subaru Impreza S8 WRC '02

The 2002 Rally GB (formally the 58th Network Q Rally of Great Britain) was the fourteenth and final round of the 2002 World Rally Championship. The race was held over four days between 14 November and 17 November 2002, and was won by Subaru's Petter Solberg, his 1st win in the World Rally Championship.

== Background ==
=== Entry list ===
No.	Driver	Co-Driver	Entrant	Car	Tyre
World Rally Championship manufacturer entries
1	(United Kingdom) Richard Burns	(United Kingdom) Robert Reid	(France) Peugeot Total	Peugeot 206 WRC	MI
2	(Finland) Marcus Grönholm	(Finland) Timo Rautiainen	(France) Peugeot Total	Peugeot 206 WRC	MI
3	(Finland) Harri Rovanperä	(Finland) Risto Pietiläinen	(France) Peugeot Total	Peugeot 206 WRC	MI
4	(Spain) Carlos Sainz	(Spain) Luis Moya	(United Kingdom) Ford Motor Co. Ltd.	Ford Focus RS WRC '02	P
5	(United Kingdom) Colin McRae	(United Kingdom) Derek Ringer	(United Kingdom) Ford Motor Co. Ltd.	Ford Focus RS WRC '02	P
6	(Estonia) Markko Märtin	(United Kingdom) Michael Park	(United Kingdom) Ford Motor Co. Ltd.	Ford Focus RS WRC '02	P
7	(France) François Delecour	(France) Daniel Grataloup	(Japan) Marlboro Mitsubishi Ralliart	Mitsubishi Lancer WRC2	MI
8	(United Kingdom) Justin Dale	(United Kingdom) Andrew Bargery	(Japan) Marlboro Mitsubishi Ralliart	Mitsubishi Lancer WRC2	MI
9	(Finland) Jani Paasonen	(Finland) Arto Kapanen	(Japan) Marlboro Mitsubishi Ralliart	Mitsubishi Lancer WRC2	MI
10	(Finland) Tommi Mäkinen	(Finland) Kaj Lindström	(Japan) 555 Subaru World Rally Team	Subaru Impreza S8 WRC '02	P
11	(Norway) Petter Solberg	(United Kingdom) Phil Mills	(Japan) 555 Subaru World Rally Team	Subaru Impreza S8 WRC '02	P
14	(Sweden) Kenneth Eriksson	(Sweden) Tina Thörner	(Czech Republic) Škoda Motorsport	Škoda Octavia WRC Evo3	MI
15	(Finland) Toni Gardemeister	(Finland) Paavo Lukander	(Czech Republic) Škoda Motorsport	Škoda Octavia WRC Evo3	MI
16	(Czech Republic) Roman Kresta	(Czech Republic) Miloš Hůlka	(Czech Republic) Škoda Motorsport	Škoda Octavia WRC Evo3	MI
17	(Germany) Armin Schwarz	(Germany) Manfred Hiemer	(South Korea) Hyundai Castrol World Rally Team	Hyundai Accent WRC3	MI
18	(Belgium) Freddy Loix	(Belgium) Sven Smeets	(South Korea) Hyundai Castrol World Rally Team	Hyundai Accent WRC3	MI
19	(Finland) Juha Kankkunen	(Finland) Juha Repo	(South Korea) Hyundai Castrol World Rally Team	Hyundai Accent WRC3	MI
World Rally Championship entries
20	(Sweden) Thomas Rådström	(France) Denis Giraudet	(France) Automobiles Citroën	Citroën Xsara WRC	MI
21	(France) Sébastien Loeb	(Monaco) Daniel Elena	(France) Automobiles Citroën	Citroën Xsara WRC	MI
23	(France) Gilles Panizzi	(France) Hervé Panizzi	(France) Bozian Racing	Peugeot 206 WRC	MI
24	(United Kingdom) Mark Higgins	(United Kingdom) Bryan Thomas	(United Kingdom) Ford Motor Co. Ltd.	Ford Focus RS WRC '02	P
25	(Finland) Juuso Pykälistö	(Finland) Esko Mertsalmi	(Finland) Juuso Pykälistö	Peugeot 206 WRC	MI
26	(Germany) Armin Kremer	(Germany) Dieter Schneppenheim	(Germany) Armin Kremer	Ford Focus RS WRC '01	P
27	(Greece) Ioannis Papadimitriou	(United Kingdom) Allan Harryman	(Greece) Ioannis Papadimitriou	Ford Focus RS WRC '01	—N/a
28	(Finland) Mikko Hirvonen	(Finland) Jarmo Lehtinen	(Finland) Mikko Hirvonen	Subaru Impreza S6 WRC '00	P
29	(Austria) Manfred Stohl	(Austria) Ilka Minor	(Austria) Stohl Racing	Ford Focus RS WRC '01	P
31	(Spain) Txus Jaio	(Spain) Lucas Cruz	(Spain) Ford España	Ford Focus RS WRC '00	—N/a
32	(United Kingdom) David Higgins	(United Kingdom) Daniel Barritt	(United Kingdom) David Higgins	Subaru Impreza S5 WRC '99	P
33	(Poland) Tomasz Kuchar	(Poland) Maciej Szczepaniak	(Poland) Tomasz Kuchar	Toyota Corolla WRC	MI
34	(Republic of Ireland) Austin MacHale	(Republic of Ireland) Brian Murphy	(Republic of Ireland) Austin MacHale	Toyota Corolla WRC	—N/a
35	(Finland) Jari-Matti Latvala	(Finland) Carl Williamson	(Finland) Jari-Matti Latvala	Mitsubishi Lancer Evo VI	P
46	(Italy) Valentino Rossi	(Italy) Carlo Cassina	(Finland) Michelin Grifone	Peugeot 206 WRC	MI
101	(United Kingdom) Alistair Ginley	(Republic of Ireland) Rory Kennedy	(United Kingdom) Alistair Ginley	Ford Focus RS WRC '01	—N/a
102	(Republic of Ireland) Eamonn Boland	(Republic of Ireland) Francis Regan	(Republic of Ireland) Eamonn Boland	Subaru Impreza S5 WRC '99	—N/a
102	(United Kingdom) Gareth Jones	(United Kingdom) Ryland James	(United Kingdom) Gareth Jones	Subaru Impreza S5 WRC '99	—N/a
107	(United Kingdom) Mick Jones	(United Kingdom) Andy Morgan	(United Kingdom) Mick Jones	Mitsubishi Lancer Evo	—N/a
108	(United Kingdom) Stephen Harron	(United Kingdom) Philip McCrea	(United Kingdom) Stephen Harron	Subaru Impreza S5 WRC '99	—N/a
110	(United Kingdom) Robert Ceen	(United Kingdom) Alistair Douglas	(United Kingdom) Robert Ceen	Subaru Impreza 555	—N/a
113	(United Kingdom) Natalie Barratt	(United Kingdom) Roger Freeman	(United Kingdom) Natalie Barratt Rallysport	Hyundai Accent WRC	—N/a
124	(United Kingdom) Steve Fleck	(United Kingdom) Mark Aspinwall	(United Kingdom) Steve Fleck	Subaru Impreza S5 WRC '98	—N/a
134	(United Kingdom) Peter Stephenson	(United Kingdom) Allan Whittaker	(United Kingdom) Peter Stephenson	Subaru Impreza S6 WRC '00	—N/a
JWRC entries
51	(Italy) Andrea Dallavilla	(Italy) Giovanni Bernacchini	(Italy) Vieffe Corse SRL	Citroën Saxo S1600	MI
52	(United Kingdom) Niall McShea	(United Kingdom) Michael Orr	(Germany) Opel Motorsport	Opel Corsa S1600	MI
53	(Italy) Giandomenico Basso	(Italy) Luigi Pirollo	(Italy) Top Run SRL	Fiat Punto S1600	MI
55	(Belgium) François Duval	(Belgium) Jean-Marc Fortin	(United Kingdom) Ford Motor Co. Ltd.	Ford Puma S1600	MI
56	(Finland) Jussi Välimäki	(Finland) Tero Gardemeister	(France) Citroën Sport	Citroën Saxo S1600	MI
57	(Paraguay) Alejandro Galanti	(Spain) Xavier Amigó	(Italy) Astra Racing	Ford Puma S1600	MI
58	(Italy) Christian Chemin	(Italy) Simone Scattolin	(Italy) Hawk Racing Club	Fiat Punto S1600	MI
59	(Finland) Juha Kangas	(Finland) Jani Laaksonen	(Japan) Suzuki Sport	Suzuki Ignis S1600	MI
61	(United Kingdom) Gwyndaf Evans	(United Kingdom) Chris Patterson	(United Kingdom) MG Sport & Racing	MG ZR S1600	P
62	(Finland) Janne Tuohino	(Finland) Petri Vihavainen	(France) Citroën Sport	Citroën Saxo S1600	MI
63	(United Kingdom) Martin Rowe	(United Kingdom) Chris Wood	(Italy) Astra Racing	Ford Puma S1600	MI
65	(Spain) Daniel Solà	(Spain) Álex Romaní	(France) Citroën Sport	Citroën Saxo S1600	MI
66	(San Marino) Mirco Baldacci	(Italy) Maurizio Barone	(Italy) Vieffe Corse SRL	Citroën Saxo S1600	MI
67	(Sweden) Daniel Carlsson	(Sweden) Mattias Andersson	(Italy) Astra Racing	Ford Puma S1600	MI
68	(Germany) Nikolaus Schelle	(Germany) Tanja Geilhausen	(Japan) Suzuki Sport	Suzuki Ignis S1600	MI
69	(Finland) Kosti Katajamäki	(Finland) Jakke Honkanen	(Germany) Volkswagen Racing	Volkswagen Polo S1600	MI
70	(Germany) Sven Haaf	(Germany) Michael Kölbach	(Germany) Opel Motorsport	Opel Corsa S1600	MI
75	(Japan) Kazuhiko Niwa	(Japan) Akihiko Takahashi	(Japan) Suzuki Sport	Suzuki Ignis S1600	MI
76	(Norway) Alexander Foss	(United Kingdom) Richard Pashley	(United Kingdom) Ford Motor Co. Ltd.	Ford Puma S1600	MI

=== Itinerary ===
All dates and times are GMT (UTC±0).

Date	Time	No.	Stage name	Distance
Leg 1 — 135.03 km
14 November	19:30	SS1	Cardiff SSS 1	2.45 km
15 November	07:44	SS2	Brechfa 1	23.12 km
15 November	08:23	SS3	Trawscoed 1	27.97 km
15 November	11:29	SS4	Brechfa 2	23.12 km
15 November	12:08	SS5	Trawscoed 2	27.97 km
15 November	15:28	SS6	Rheola 1	27.95 km
15 November	19:35	SS7	Cardiff SSS 2	2.45 km
Leg 2 — 117.04 km
16 November	08:11	SS8	Resolfen 1	54.69 km
16 November	11:52	SS9	Crychan 1	12.67 km
16 November	12:21	SS10	Halfway 1	17.28 km
16 November	14:46	SS11	Crychan 2	12.67 km
16 November	15:15	SS12	Halfway 2	17.28 km
16 November	19:30	SS13	Cardiff SSS 3	2.45 km
Leg 3 — 138.50 km
17 November	07:41	SS14	Resolfen 2	54.69 km
17 November	10:43	SS15	Rheola 2	27.95 km
17 November	11:59	SS16	Margam 1	27.93 km
17 November	14:06	SS17	Margam 2	27.93 km

== Results ==
=== Overall ===
Pos.	No.	Driver	Co-driver	Team	Car	Time	Difference	Points
1	11	(Norway) Petter Solberg	(United Kingdom) Phil Mills	(Japan) 555 Subaru World Rally Team	Subaru Impreza S8 WRC '02	3:30:36.4		10
2	6	(Estonia) Markko Märtin	(United Kingdom) Michael Park	(United Kingdom) Ford Motor Co. Ltd.	Ford Focus RS WRC '02	3:31:00.8	+24.4	6
3	4	(Spain) Carlos Sainz	(Spain) Luis Moya	(United Kingdom) Ford Motor Co. Ltd.	Ford Focus RS WRC '02	3:32:12.1	+1:35.7	4
4	10	(Finland) Tommi Mäkinen	(Finland) Kaj Lindström	(Japan) 555 Subaru World Rally Team	Subaru Impreza S8 WRC '02	3:33:13.9	+2:37.5	3
5	5	(United Kingdom) Colin McRae	(United Kingdom) Derek Ringer	(United Kingdom) Ford Motor Co. Ltd.	Ford Focus RS WRC '02	3:33:37.9	+3:01.5	2
6	24	(United Kingdom) Mark Higgins	(United Kingdom) Bryan Thomas	(United Kingdom) Ford Motor Co. Ltd.	Ford Focus RS WRC '02	3:35:38.3	+5:01.9	1

=== World Rally Cars ===
==== Classification ====
Position		No.	Driver	Co-driver	Entrant	Car	Time	Difference	Points
Event	Class	No.	Driver	Co-driver	Entrant	Car	Time	Difference	Points
1	1	11	(Norway) Petter Solberg	(United Kingdom) Phil Mills	(Japan) 555 Subaru World Rally Team	Subaru Impreza S8 WRC '02	3:30:36.4		10
2	2	6	(Estonia) Markko Märtin	(United Kingdom) Michael Park	(United Kingdom) Ford Motor Co. Ltd.	Ford Focus RS WRC '02	3:31:00.8	+24.4	6
3	3	4	(Spain) Carlos Sainz	(Spain) Luis Moya	(United Kingdom) Ford Motor Co. Ltd.	Ford Focus RS WRC '02	3:32:12.1	+1:35.7	4
4	4	10	(Finland) Tommi Mäkinen	(Finland) Kaj Lindström	(Japan) 555 Subaru World Rally Team	Subaru Impreza S8 WRC '02	3:33:13.9	+2:37.5	3
5	5	5	(United Kingdom) Colin McRae	(United Kingdom) Derek Ringer	(United Kingdom) Ford Motor Co. Ltd.	Ford Focus RS WRC '02	3:33:37.9	+3:01.5	2
7	6	3	(Finland) Harri Rovanperä	(Finland) Risto Pietiläinen	(France) Peugeot Total	Peugeot 206 WRC	3:35:52.2	+5:15.8	0
8	7	18	(Belgium) Freddy Loix	(Belgium) Sven Smeets	(South Korea) Hyundai Castrol World Rally Team	Hyundai Accent WRC3	3:35:52.3	+5:15.9	0
9	8	19	(Finland) Juha Kankkunen	(Finland) Juha Repo	(South Korea) Hyundai Castrol World Rally Team	Hyundai Accent WRC3	3:36:05.5	+5:29.1	0
10	9	15	(Finland) Toni Gardemeister	(Finland) Paavo Lukander	(Czech Republic) Škoda Motorsport	Škoda Octavia WRC Evo3	3:36:39.3	+6:02.9	0
13	10	14	(Sweden) Kenneth Eriksson	(Sweden) Tina Thörner	(Czech Republic) Škoda Motorsport	Škoda Octavia WRC Evo3	3:41:01.8	+10:25.4	0
15	11	16	(Czech Republic) Roman Kresta	(Czech Republic) Miloš Hůlka	(Czech Republic) Škoda Motorsport	Škoda Octavia WRC Evo3	3:47:02.4	+16:26.0	0
Retired SS16		1	(United Kingdom) Richard Burns	(United Kingdom) Robert Reid	(France) Peugeot Total	Peugeot 206 WRC	Accident		0
Retired SS10		2	(Finland) Marcus Grönholm	(Finland) Timo Rautiainen	(France) Peugeot Total	Peugeot 206 WRC	Accident		0
Retired SS10		7	(France) François Delecour	(France) Daniel Grataloup	(Japan) Marlboro Mitsubishi Ralliart	Mitsubishi Lancer WRC2	Accident		0
Retired SS10		9	(Finland) Jani Paasonen	(Finland) Arto Kapanen	(Japan) Marlboro Mitsubishi Ralliart	Mitsubishi Lancer WRC2	Accident		0
Retired SS9		17	(Germany) Armin Schwarz	(Germany) Manfred Hiemer	(South Korea) Hyundai Castrol World Rally Team	Hyundai Accent WRC3	Driver ill		0
Retired SS5		8	(United Kingdom) Justin Dale	(United Kingdom) Andrew Bargery	(Japan) Marlboro Mitsubishi Ralliart	Mitsubishi Lancer WRC2	Accident damage		0

==== Special stages ====
Day	Stage	Stage name	Length	Winner	Car	Time	Class leaders
Leg 1 (14 Nov)	SS1	Cardiff SSS 1	2.45 km	(Estonia) Markko Märtin	Ford Focus RS WRC '02	2:07.7	(Estonia) Markko Märtin
Leg 1 (15 Nov)	SS2	Brechfa 1	23.12 km	(Finland) Marcus Grönholm	Peugeot 206 WRC	13:24.2	(Finland) Marcus Grönholm
Leg 1 (15 Nov)	SS3	Trawscoed 1	27.97 km	(Finland) Marcus Grönholm	Peugeot 206 WRC	16:36.5	(Finland) Marcus Grönholm
Leg 1 (15 Nov)	SS4	Brechfa 2	23.12 km	Stage cancelled			(Finland) Marcus Grönholm
Leg 1 (15 Nov)	SS5	Trawscoed 2	27.97 km	(Finland) Marcus Grönholm	Peugeot 206 WRC	16:52.6	(Finland) Marcus Grönholm
Leg 1 (15 Nov)	SS6	Rheola 1	27.95 km	(Finland) Marcus Grönholm	Peugeot 206 WRC	15:55.5	(Finland) Marcus Grönholm
Leg 1 (15 Nov)	SS7	Cardiff SSS 2	2.45 km	(Norway) Petter Solberg	Subaru Impreza S8 WRC '02	2:07.2	(Finland) Marcus Grönholm
Leg 2 (16 Nov)	SS8	Resolfen 1	54.69 km	(Finland) Marcus Grönholm	Peugeot 206 WRC	28:56.5	(Finland) Marcus Grönholm
Leg 2 (16 Nov)	SS9	Crychan 1	12.67 km	(Norway) Petter Solberg	Subaru Impreza S8 WRC '02	7:03.6	(Finland) Marcus Grönholm
Leg 2 (16 Nov)	SS10	Halfway 1	17.28 km	(United Kingdom) Richard Burns	Peugeot 206 WRC	9:50.8	(Estonia) Markko Märtin
Leg 2 (16 Nov)	SS11	Crychan 2	12.67 km	(Norway) Petter Solberg	Subaru Impreza S8 WRC '02	7:07.1	(Estonia) Markko Märtin
Leg 2 (16 Nov)	SS12	Halfway 2	17.28 km	(Norway) Petter Solberg	Subaru Impreza S8 WRC '02	9:59.9	(Estonia) Markko Märtin
Leg 2 (16 Nov)	SS13	Cardiff SSS 3	2.45 km	(Norway) Petter Solberg	Subaru Impreza S8 WRC '02	2:07.9	(Estonia) Markko Märtin
Leg 3 (17 Nov)	SS14	Resolfen 2	54.69 km	(Norway) Petter Solberg	Subaru Impreza S8 WRC '02	28:49.4	(Norway) Petter Solberg
Leg 3 (17 Nov)	SS15	Rheola 2	27.95 km	(Estonia) Markko Märtin	Ford Focus RS WRC '02	15:49.6	(Norway) Petter Solberg
Leg 3 (17 Nov)	SS16	Margam 1	27.93 km	(Norway) Petter Solberg	Subaru Impreza S8 WRC '02	16:12.3	(Norway) Petter Solberg
Leg 3 (17 Nov)	SS17	Margam 2	27.93 km	(Norway) Petter Solberg	Subaru Impreza S8 WRC '02	16:06.1	(Norway) Petter Solberg

==== Championship standings ====
- **Bold text** indicates 2002 World Champions.

Pos.	Drivers' championships			Co-drivers' championships			Manufacturers' championships		
Pos.	Move	Driver	Points	Move	Co-driver	Points	Move	Manufacturer	Points
1		(Finland) **Marcus Grönholm**	77		(Finland) **Timo Rautiainen**	77		(France) **Peugeot Total**	165
2	5	(Norway) Petter Solberg	37	5	(United Kingdom) Phil Mills	37		(United Kingdom) Ford Motor Co. Ltd.	104
3	1	(Spain) Carlos Sainz	36	1	(Spain) Luis Moya	36		(Japan) 555 Subaru World Rally Team	67
4	1	(United Kingdom) Colin McRae	35	1	(United Kingdom) Nicky Grist	35	2	(South Korea) Hyundai Castrol World Rally Team	10
5	3	(United Kingdom) Richard Burns	34	3	(United Kingdom) Robert Reid	34	1	(Czech Republic) Škoda Motorsport	9

=== Junior World Rally Championship ===
==== Classification ====
Position		No.	Driver	Co-driver	Entrant	Car	Time	Difference	Points
Event	Class	No.	Driver	Co-driver	Entrant	Car	Time	Difference	Points
21	1	65	(Spain) Daniel Solà	(Spain) Álex Romaní	(France) Citroën Sport	Citroën Saxo S1600	4:03:06.6		10
23	2	52	(United Kingdom) Niall McShea	(United Kingdom) Michael Orr	(Germany) Opel Motorsport	Opel Corsa S1600	4:06:05.9	+2:59.3	6
24	3	53	(Italy) Giandomenico Basso	(Italy) Luigi Pirollo	(Italy) Top Run SRL	Fiat Punto S1600	4:06:26.2	+3:19.6	4
25	4	62	(Finland) Janne Tuohino	(Finland) Petri Vihavainen	(France) Citroën Sport	Citroën Saxo S1600	4:07:14.2	+4:07.6	3
27	5	56	(Finland) Jussi Välimäki	(Finland) Tero Gardemeister	(France) Citroën Sport	Citroën Saxo S1600	4:08:34.4	+5:27.8	2
28	6	51	(Italy) Andrea Dallavilla	(Italy) Giovanni Bernacchini	(Italy) Vieffe Corse SRL	Citroën Saxo S1600	4:09:26.8	+6:20.2	1
Retired SS17		58	(Italy) Christian Chemin	(Italy) Simone Scattolin	(Italy) Hawk Racing Club	Fiat Punto S1600	Accident		0
Retired SS17		66	(San Marino) Mirco Baldacci	(Italy) Maurizio Barone	(Italy) Vieffe Corse SRL	Citroën Saxo S1600	Over time limit		0
Retired SS15		61	(United Kingdom) Gwyndaf Evans	(United Kingdom) Chris Patterson	(United Kingdom) MG Sport & Racing	MG ZR S1600	Suspension		0
Retired SS15		67	(Sweden) Daniel Carlsson	(Sweden) Mattias Andersson	(Italy) Astra Racing	Ford Puma S1600	Oil leak		0
Retired SS14		57	(Paraguay) Alejandro Galanti	(Spain) Xavier Amigó	(Italy) Astra Racing	Ford Puma S1600	Transmission		0
Retired SS13		76	(Norway) Alexander Foss	(United Kingdom) Richard Pashley	(United Kingdom) Ford Motor Co. Ltd.	Ford Puma S1600	Over time limit		0
Retired SS8		69	(Finland) Kosti Katajamäki	(Finland) Jakke Honkanen	(Germany) Volkswagen Racing	Volkswagen Polo S1600	Accident		0
Retired SS8		70	(Germany) Sven Haaf	(Germany) Michael Kölbach	(Germany) Opel Motorsport	Opel Corsa S1600	Retired		0
Retired SS7		63	(United Kingdom) Martin Rowe	(United Kingdom) Chris Wood	(Italy) Astra Racing	Ford Puma S1600	Engine		0
Retired SS6		55	(Belgium) François Duval	(Belgium) Jean-Marc Fortin	(United Kingdom) Ford Motor Co. Ltd.	Ford Puma S1600	Gearbox		0
Retired SS3		59	(Finland) Juha Kangas	(Finland) Jani Laaksonen	(Japan) Suzuki Sport	Suzuki Ignis S1600	Accident		0
Retired SS3		68	(Germany) Nikolaus Schelle	(Germany) Tanja Geilhausen	(Japan) Suzuki Sport	Suzuki Ignis S1600	Accident		0
Retired SS2		75	(Japan) Kazuhiko Niwa	(Japan) Akihiko Takahashi	(Japan) Suzuki Sport	Suzuki Ignis S1600	Accident		0

==== Special stages ====
Day	Stage	Stage name	Length	Winner	Car	Time	Class leaders
Leg 1 (14 Nov)	SS1	Cardiff SSS 1	2.45 km	(United Kingdom) Gwyndaf Evans	MG ZR S1600	2:21.8	(United Kingdom) Gwyndaf Evans
Leg 1 (15 Nov)	SS2	Brechfa 1	23.12 km	(Finland) Janne Tuohino	Citroën Saxo S1600	15:40.8	(Finland) Janne Tuohino
Leg 1 (15 Nov)	SS3	Trawscoed 1	27.97 km	(Spain) Daniel Solà	Citroën Saxo S1600	19:20.7	(Spain) Daniel Solà
Leg 1 (15 Nov)	SS4	Brechfa 2	23.12 km	Stage cancelled			(Spain) Daniel Solà
Leg 1 (15 Nov)	SS5	Trawscoed 2	27.97 km	(Italy) Andrea Dallavilla	Citroën Saxo S1600	19:25.6	(Finland) Janne Tuohino
Leg 1 (15 Nov)	SS6	Rheola 1	27.95 km	(Spain) Daniel Solà	Citroën Saxo S1600	18:30.2	(Finland) Janne Tuohino
Leg 1 (15 Nov)	SS7	Cardiff SSS 2	2.45 km	(Italy) Andrea Dallavilla	Citroën Saxo S1600	2:21.6	(Finland) Janne Tuohino
Leg 2 (16 Nov)	SS8	Resolfen 1	54.69 km	(Spain) Daniel Solà	Citroën Saxo S1600	33:27.8	(Spain) Daniel Solà
Leg 2 (16 Nov)	SS9	Crychan 1	12.67 km	(Spain) Daniel Solà	Citroën Saxo S1600	8:10.3	(Spain) Daniel Solà
Leg 2 (16 Nov)	SS10	Halfway 1	17.28 km	Notional stage time			(Spain) Daniel Solà
Leg 2 (16 Nov)	SS11	Crychan 2	12.67 km	(San Marino) Mirco Baldacci	Citroën Saxo S1600	8:13.2	(Spain) Daniel Solà
Leg 2 (16 Nov)	SS12	Halfway 2	17.28 km	(United Kingdom) Niall McShea	Opel Corsa S1600	11:15.5	(Spain) Daniel Solà
Leg 2 (16 Nov)	SS13	Cardiff SSS 3	2.45 km	(San Marino) Mirco Baldacci	Citroën Saxo S1600	2:22.4	(Spain) Daniel Solà
Leg 3 (17 Nov)	SS14	Resolfen 2	54.69 km	(San Marino) Mirco Baldacci	Citroën Saxo S1600	33:14.7	(Spain) Daniel Solà
Leg 3 (17 Nov)	SS15	Rheola 2	27.95 km	(Finland) Jussi Välimäki	Citroën Saxo S1600	18:14.0	(Spain) Daniel Solà
Leg 3 (17 Nov)	SS16	Margam 1	27.93 km	(United Kingdom) Niall McShea	Opel Corsa S1600	18:33.2	(Spain) Daniel Solà
Leg 3 (17 Nov)	SS17	Margam 2	27.93 km	(United Kingdom) Niall McShea	Opel Corsa S1600	18:36.1	(Spain) Daniel Solà

==== Championship standings ====
- **Bold text** indicates 2002 World Champions.

Pos.	Drivers' championships		
Pos.	Move	Driver	Points
1	1	(Spain) **Daniel Solà**	37
2	1	(Italy) Andrea Dallavilla	29
3	1	(Finland) Janne Tuohino	15
4	2	(Italy) Giandomenico Basso	14
5	2	(Italy) Nicola Caldani	13
