= Wyrley =

Wyrley may refer to:

- Great Wyrley, Staffordshire, England
- Little Wyrley, Staffordshire, England
- William Wyrley, English antiquarian and officer of arms
- Mark Wyrley, English MP
