= Bert de Jong (rally driver) =

Dutch rally driver

Personal information
- Nationality: (Netherlands) Dutch
- Born: 1956
- Died: August 2013 (aged 56–57)

World Rally Championship record
- Years active: 1998, 2000, 2010
- Rallies: 3
- Championships: 0
- Rally wins: 0
- Podiums: 0
- Stage wins: 0
- First rally: 1998 Tour de Corse
- Last rally: 2010 Rallye Deutschland

Bert de Jong (1956 – 13 August 2013) was a Dutch rally driver. De Jong started racing in 1986 and he won the Dutch championship in 1995 and 1996 with a Ford Escort RS Cosworth. De Jong then changed to a Subaru Impreza WRC and started racing in Europe. He finished first during four rally's counting for the European Rally Championship, twice the Rally Hellendoorn and once the Rally Croatia and Rally Andorra. In 1999 he was involved in a severe crash in Croatia. He quit rally in 2000. In 2009 De Jong returned to rallying and in 2012 he drove the Mitsubishi Lancer WRC05 of the team of his son Bob. On 13 August 2013 he died after a long struggle with cancer.

== Career results ==
=== WRC results ===
Year	Entrant	Car	1	2	3	4	5	6	7	8	9	10	11	12	13	14	WDC	Pts
1998	Bert de Jong	Subaru Impreza S3 WRC '97	MON	SWE	KEN	POR	ESP	FRA; 13	ARG	GRC	NZL	FIN	ITA	AUS	GBR		NC	0
2000	Bert de Jong	Subaru Impreza S4 WRC '98	MON	SWE	KEN	POR	ESP	ARG	GRC	NZL	FIN	CYP	FRA	ITA	AUS	GBR; 41	NC	0
2010	Bert de Jong	Mitsubishi Lancer WRC 05	SWE	MEX	JOR	TUR	NZL	POR	BUL	FIN	GER; 21	JPN	FRA	ESP	GBR		NC	0
