= Jussi Välimäki =

Finnish rally driver (born 1974)

Personal information
- Nationality: (Finland) Finnish
- Born: September 10, 1974 (age 52)

World Rally Championship record
- Years active: 1998–2008
- Co-driver: (Finland) Jarkko Kalliolepo (Finland) Jakke Honkanen (Finland) Tero Gardemeister (Finland) Teppo Leino
- Teams: Hyundai
- Rallies: 36
- Championships: 0
- Rally wins: 0
- Podiums: 0
- Stage wins: 0
- Total points: 8
- First rally: 1998 Rally Sweden
- Last rally: 2008 Rally Finland

Jussi Välimäki (born 9 September 1974 in Tampere) is a Finnish rally driver, who scored eight World Rally Championship points during his career, with a best finish of fifth on the 2006 Rally d'Italia Sardegna.

== Career ==
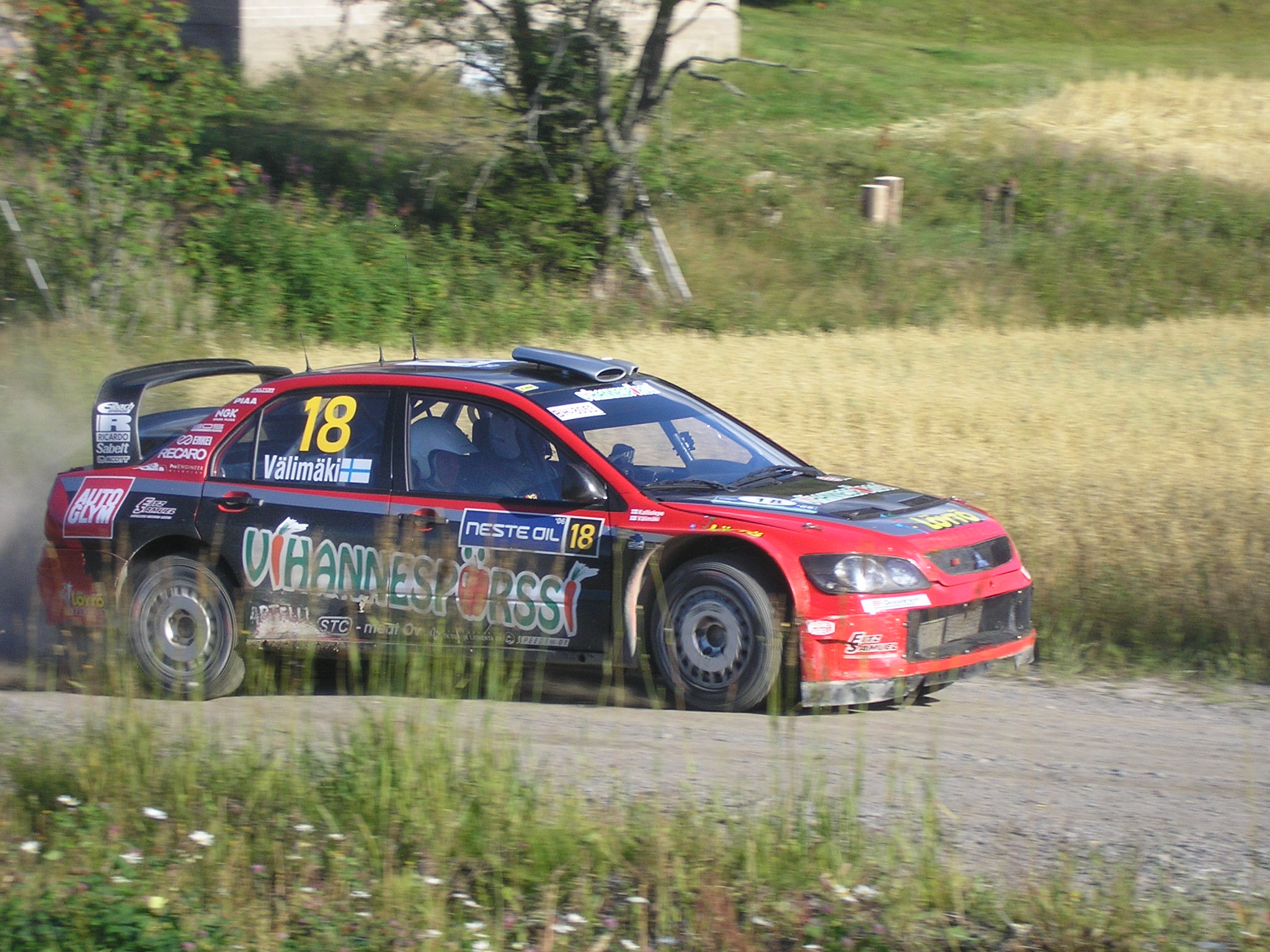
Välimäki at the 2006 Rally Finland

Välimäki's first World Rally Championship events came in 1998, in Sweden and Finland, behind the wheel of an Opel Astra GSi 16V. In 2000 he drove a Ford Escort WRC to 13th place on Rally Finland. In 2001 he contested the Junior World Rally Championship (JWRC) in a Peugeot 206 S1600, finishing third in the category in Finland and finishing the season ninth. He contested the 2002 JWRC season in a Citroën Saxo, but only managed a best finish of fifth on Rally GB, ending the year 15th in the classification. He also did two other WRC rounds in a Toyota Corolla WRC, but retired from both.

2003 saw Välimäki do four WRC rounds with the Hyundai team, but he retired from all four of them. He used the Hyundai Accent on four rounds of the 2004 season, finishing seventh on Rally Mexico. He also used a Ford Focus RS WRC 03 on Rallye Deutschland, finishing 14th. In 2005, Välimäki won the FIA Asia-Pacific Rally Championship, with five wins from seven rallies.

Välimäki returned to top-class WRC action in 2006, entering three rounds with a Mitsubishi Lancer WRC05. He used it to finish fifth on Rally d'Italia Sardegna, before finishing ninth in Greece and seventh in Finland.

In 2007, Välimäki won the Finnish Rally Championship, and was runner-up in the following season. In 2009 he contested the Chinese Rally Championship.

In 2011, Välimäki announced he was ending his active rallying career.

== WRC results ==
Year	Entrant	Car	1	2	3	4	5	6	7	8	9	10	11	12	13	14	15	16	WDC	Points
1998	Jussi Välimäki	Opel Astra GSi 16V	MON	SWE; 35	KEN	POR	ESP	FRA	ARG	GRE	NZL	FIN; 38	ITA	AUS	GBR				NC	0
1999	Jussi Välimäki	Mitsubishi Lancer Evo VI	MON	SWE	KEN	POR	ESP	FRA	ARG	GRE	NZL	FIN; Ret	CHN	ITA	AUS	GBR			NC	0
2000	Jussi Välimäki	Mitsubishi Lancer Evo VI	MON	SWE; 30	KEN	POR	ESP	ARG	GRE	NZL		CYP	FRA	ITA	AUS	GBR; 31			NC	0
2000	Jussi Välimäki	Ford Escort WRC									FIN; 13								NC	0
2001	Jussi Välimäki	Peugeot 206 S1600	MON	SWE	POR	ESP; Ret	ARG	CYP	GRE; Ret	KEN	FIN; 36	NZL	ITA; Ret	FRA; 29	AUS	GBR; Ret			NC	0
2002	Jussi Välimäki	Citroën Saxo S1600	MON; Ret	SWE	FRA	ESP; Ret	CYP	ARG	GRE; Ret	KEN	FIN	GER; Ret	ITA; 23	NZL	AUS	GBR; 27			NC	0
2002	Jussi Välimäki	Toyota Corolla WRC		SWE; 18							FIN; Ret								NC	0
2002	Jussi Välimäki	Mitsubishi Lancer Evo VI													AUS; 15				NC	0
2003	Hyundai World Rally Team	Hyundai Accent WRC3	MON	SWE; Ret	TUR	NZL; Ret	ARG	GRE; Ret	CYP	GER	FIN; Ret	AUS	ITA	FRA	ESP	GBR			NC	0
2004	Jussi Välimäki	Hyundai Accent WRC	MON; 11	SWE	MEX; 7	NZL	CYP; Ret	GRE; Ret	TUR	ARG									27th	2
2004	Jussi Välimäki	Suzuki Ignis S1600									FIN; 26								27th	2
2004	Jussi Välimäki	Ford Focus RS WRC 03										GER; 14	JPN	GBR	ITA	FRA	ESP	AUS	27th	2
2005	Jussi Välimäki	Mitsubishi Lancer Evo VIII	MON	SWE; 21	MEX	NZL	ITA	CYP	TUR	GRE	ARG	FIN	GER	GBR	JPN	FRA	ESP	AUS	NC	0
2006	Jussi Välimäki	Mitsubishi Lancer WRC05	MON	SWE	MEX	ESP	FRA	ARG	ITA; 5	GRE; 9	GER	FIN; 7	JPN	CYP	TUR	AUS	NZL	GBR	16th	6
2008	Jussi Välimäki	Mitsubishi Lancer Evo IX	MON	SWE	MEX	ARG	JOR	ITA	GRE	TUR	FIN; 14	GER	NZL	ESP	FRA	JPN	GBR		NC	0

=== JWRC Results ===
Year	Entrant	Car	1	2	3	4	5	6	JWRC	Points
2001	Jussi Välimäki	Peugeot 206 S1600	ESP; Ret	GRE; 7	FIN; 3	ITA; Ret	FRA; 12	GBR; Ret	9th	4
2002	Jussi Välimäki	Citroën Saxo S1600	MON; Ret	ESP; Ret	GRE; Ret	GER; Ret	ITA; 9	GBR; 5	15th	2

=== PWRC results ===
Year	Entrant	Car	1	2	3	4	5	6	7	8	PWRC	Points
2008	Jussi Välimäki	Mitsubishi Lancer Evo IX	SWE	ARG	GRE	TUR	FIN; 2	NZL	JPN	GBR	15th	8

Sporting positions
Preceded by Karamjit Singh	Asia-Pacific Rally Champion; 2005	Succeeded by Cody Crocker
