= Peter Heatherington =

English rally driver

Personal information
- Nationality: (United Kingdom) British
- Born: February 18, 1949 (age 77); Morpeth, Northumberland, United Kingdom

World Rally Championship record
- Years active: 2000
- Teams: Privateer
- Rallies: 1
- Championships: 0
- Rally wins: 0
- Podiums: 0
- Stage wins: 0
- Total points: 0
- First rally: 2000 Rally GB
- Last rally: 2000 Rally GB

Peter Heatherington (born 18 February 1949) is an English retired rally driver from Morpeth. He first appeared in the British Rally Championship when he was 49.

He was co-driven by his son, Chris Heatherington. Peter made his WRC debut at Rally GB in 2000 as a privateer entry and was 53rd. He referred to his start as a "once in a lifetime" event for him and true to his word, it was to be his only start in Rally GB, but at least they made it to the finish.
