= Sequential transmission =

Sequential transmission may refer to:

- Automated manual transmission, a type of mechanical power transmission; which is based on a conventional manual transmission, but is controlled by a computer, and can operate fully automatically.
- Semi-automatic transmission, a method of mechanical power transmission used in motor vehicles; where part of its operation is automated (namely the clutch system), but the driver's input is still required to manually change gears
- Sequential manual transmission, a type of mechanical power transmission; commonly used in motorcycles, race cars, and certain road cars
- Serial communication, a method of data transmission in telecommunication and computing

== See also ==
- Automatic transmission
