= Mark Wyrley =

Mark Wyrley or Worley (c. 1500–1555 or later), of Lichfield, Staffordshire, was an English Member of Parliament (MP).

He was a Member of the Parliament of England for Lichfield in March 1553 and November 1554.
