= Niall McShea =

British rally driver (born 1974)

Personal information
- Nationality: (United Kingdom) British
- Full name: Niall Joseph McShea
- Born: 1 January 1974 (age 52); Enniskillen, Northern Ireland

World Rally Championship record
- Years active: 1999–2009
- Co-driver: (United Kingdom) Mark Cassidy (United Kingdom) Michael Orr (United Kingdom) Chris Patterson (United Kingdom) Gordon Noble (Republic of Ireland) Greg Shinnors (United Kingdom) Marshall Clarke
- Rallies: 33
- Championships: 0
- Rally wins: 0
- Podiums: 0
- Stage wins: 0
- Total points: 0
- First rally: 1999 Rally of Great Britain
- Last rally: 2009 Rally Ireland

Niall Joseph McShea MBE (born 1 January 1974) is a British rally driver from Northern Ireland. He won the Production World Rally Championship (PWRC) in 2004 in a Subaru Impreza WRX STI. He drove for the Proton R3 Rally Team in the Intercontinental Rally Challenge (IRC).

== Career ==
McShea, who was born in Enniskillen, Northern Ireland, had his first experience at the wheel of a car was at the age of four when he slipped off the seat of his mother's car and drove into the front door of their house. In 1997 he won the Nissan Micra Challenge, before moving onto the British Rally Championship. In 2001 he competed in the first season of the Junior World Rally Championship driving a Ford Puma and then a Citroën Saxo, finishing in third in the standings. The following year he drove a Ray Mallock Ltd-prepared Opel Corsa in the championship, but mechanical issues restricted him to just two finishes, meaning he could only finish seventh in the standings.

In 2003, McShea moved on to the PWRC in a Mitsubishi Lancer Evo VI, finishing sixth in the standings and winning the final round of the season - the Tour de Corse. In 2004, he drove a Subaru Impreza WRX STi, and won the championship after taking four podium finishes. Funding problems would restrict McShea to limited appearances over the following seasons, but won the PWRC class on 2007 Rally Ireland. On the same event in 2009, McShea drove a Proton Satria Neo S2000, setting the third fastest stage time on the opening stage, before retiring from the event.

In 2010, McShea continued driving for Proton in the IRC. He retired from his first outing at the Czech Rally on stage nine with technical problems while running nineteen. He plays himself in the film Pegasus and he appears as Federick Schulin in the 2023 Gran Turismo film.
