= Peter Stephenson =

British billionaire businessman

Peter Stephenson is a British billionaire businessman, and the founder of Able UK.

In May 2026, Stephenson was included on the Sunday Times Rich List for the first time, with an estimated net worth of £1.266 billion.
