= Mitsubishi Lancer WRC =

Early 2000s rally car

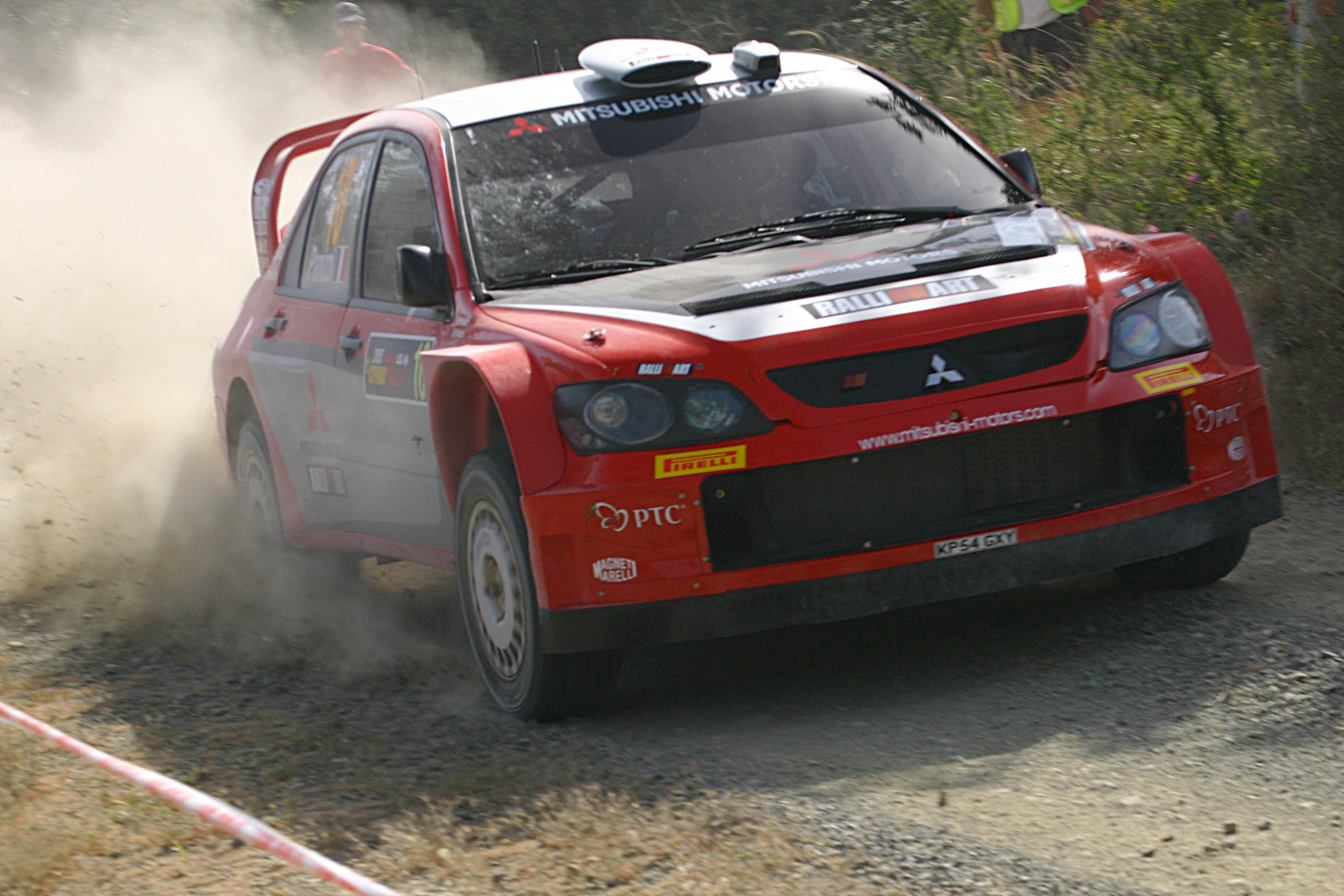
- A Mitsubishi Lancer WRC 05 driven by Gilles Panizzi
- Category: World Rally Car
- Constructor: Mitsubishi Motors; Ralliart
- Predecessor: Mitsubishi Lancer Evolution

Technical specifications
- Length: 4,360 mm (171.7 in)
- Width: 1,770 mm (69.7 in) (2001–04); 1,800 mm (70.9 in) (2005)
- Wheelbase: 2,600 mm (102.4 in)
- Engine: Mitsubishi 4G63T 2.0 L (122.0 cu in) I4 turbocharged front-engine, four-wheel-drive
- Transmission: Six-speed sequential
- Weight: 1,230 kg (2,711.7 lb)
- Tyres: Michelin; Pirelli

Competition history (WRC)
- Notable entrants: (Japan) Mitsubishi
- Debut: (Italy) 2001 Rallye Sanremo
- Last event: 2005 Rally Australia
Races	Wins	Podiums	Titles
45	0	2	0
- Constructors' Championships: 0
- Drivers' Championships: 0

The Mitsubishi Lancer WRC is a World Rally Car built by Ralliart, Mitsubishi Motors' motorsport division, to compete in the World Rally Championship. The previous Lancer Evolution series were homologated for the Group A class, and their competitiveness against World Rally Cars from other manufacturers was therefore limited.

== WRC ==
The Lancer Evolution WRC is powered by the same 1996 cc 4G63 engine that has been used in its sports and rally cars since the 1980s, in this iteration producing 300 PS (221 kW; 296 hp) at 5500 rpm and 540 N⋅m (398 lb⋅ft) at 3500 rpm. The car debuted at the 2001 Rallye Sanremo, after a relatively short development (Ralliart could not introduce the Lancer WRC later because of a contract they made with the FIA in 1999, which allowed them to run the old specification Lancers). The model was based on the then-new eighth-generation Cedia model, of which the road-going Evolution VII is based on. The WRC rules allowed more freedom in most areas of the car, therefore the engineers were able to make changes to the car they couldn't do to the older Group A Lancers. These changes included modifications to the engine and its surroundings (lighter internal parts, more rearward tilt to optimize the front weight distribution, new turbo and new exhaust system), but the most significant change was made to the suspensions: now both the front and rear suspensions were MacPhersons, and also bigger wheel arches were implemented, allowing more suspension travel. However, the drivetrain remained the same as before, and when Tommi Mäkinen left the team at the end of 2001, the new drivers couldn't get on with this special transmission, which required an aggressive left-foot braking approach. The original Evo WRC (sometimes referred to as Step1) was replaced with Step2 from 2002 Finland onwards.

== WRC2/Step2 ==
The Lancer Evolution WRC2 (also called the Step2) is also powered by the 4G63, also producing 300 PS (221 kW) at 5500 rpm and 540 N⋅m (398 lb⋅ft) at 3500 rpm. It is mated to a 6-speed sequential transmission via a triple-plate carbon clutch and distributes power to all four wheels via front-, centre- and rear- active differentials. The car's suspension is independent, with MacPherson struts and coil springs at each corner. The brakes are vented discs clamped by 6-piston calipers at the front and 4-piston calipers at the rear. The car debuted at the 2002 Rally Finland. Changes to the Evo WRC included better weight distribution and a lower centre of gravity, different front air dam to increase airflow to the radiators, a new intercooler, new exhaust manifold and a single-scroll turbocharger, and new engine parts (lightened crankshaft, flywheel and other rotating parts). The suspension was also updated to offer more travel and rigidity, and slight changes were also made to the transmission (to suit more the very different driving style of McRae and Delecour). Mitsubishi pulled out of the WRC at the end of 2002, but in 2003 they used this car for developmental purposes on some WRC events, with McRae clinching a 6th place at the 2003 Rally New Zealand.

== WRC04 ==
In 2004, Mitsubishi returned to the WRC with the Lancer WRC04, featuring over 6000 changes compared to the Step2 used in 2002 and 2003. The car continued with the 4G63 engine, mounted to a 5-speed semi-automatic transmission, and a new all-wheel-drive system co-developed by Ricardo Consulting Engineers and Mitsubishi Motors Motorsports (MMSP). The front brakes were upgraded to 8-piston calipers clamping 370 mm (15 in) discs. At the start of the season, Mitsubishi used a completely passive transmission before switching to active differentials. The bodywork was subjected to extensive aerodynamic testing at the Lola Cars wind tunnel (this resulted in the completely new front air dam, the new wheel arches, and the interesting, shopping trolley handle-like rear spoiler). The car suffered from frustrating mechanical and electrical glitches (in New Zealand, both cars retired on the start line of the first stage due to electrical issues). Mitsubishi did not complete a full 2004 season, opting out of championship events in Japan, Great Britain, Italy, France, and Australia in order to concentrate on developing the Lancer WRC.

The lead Lancer WRC04 in the 2004 World Rally Championship was driven by ex-Peugeot driver Gilles Panizzi, with his brother Hervé as co-driver. The other pairings were Gianluigi Galli with Guido D'Amore, Daniel Solá with Xavier Amigo, and Kristian Sohlberg with Kaj Lindstrom.

== WRC05 ==
The Lancer WRC05 saw no significant changes, but the car's width was increased by 30 mm (1.2 in) due to a change in the WRC regulations. The engine remained the same, but the ECU and the turbo wastegate were updated. Aerodynamic alterations to the bodywork were introduced to improve stability and to accommodate the new, wider track, while suspension links and driveshafts were lengthened. Steering-mounted gearshift paddles were also introduced, and longer ratios were adopted for first, third, and fourth gears. The car showed great promise since Panizzi took 3rd place in Monte Carlo, and ex-Peugeot man Rovanpera was fast on gravel events, eventually clinching a 2nd place at the last round in Australia, but soon after that Mitsubishi pulled out of the WRC, and only returned through Ralliart UK, who took over the cars and supported private and semi-works entries in 2006 and 2007. At 2006 Rally Sweden, local driver Daniel Carlsson made the podium with a 3rd place in the Värmland forests, in such an entry. Daniel battled for seconds, just into the finish line, with teammate Gigi Galli, who settled for the fourth spot.

To maintain some competitiveness for customer uses of the car, MML Sports (formerly Ralliart UK) made some development to the car, including an updated suspension, transmission and other, minor changes. This resulted in the car (sometimes called the WRC07) being faster than the WRC05 by a massive 0.5sec/km.
