= 2001 Rallye Sanremo =

11th round of the 2001 World Rally Championship

2001 Rallye Sanremo 43rd Rallye Sanremo - Rallye d'Italia
Round 11 of the 2001 World Rally Championship season
← Previous event	Next event →
- Host country: Italy
- Rally base: Sanremo
- Dates run: October 5, 2001 – October 7, 2001
- Stages: 20 (368.12 km; 228.74 miles)
- Stage surface: Asphalt
- Overall distance: 1,424.15 km (884.93 miles)

Statistics
- Crews: 73 at start, 37 at finish

Overall results
- Overall winner: (France) Gilles Panizzi (France) Hervé Panizzi (France) Peugeot Total; Peugeot 206 WRC

The 2001 Rallye Sanremo (formally the 43rd Rallye Sanremo - Rallye d'Italia) was the eleventh round of the 2001 World Rally Championship. The race was held over three days between 5 October and 7 October 2001, and was won by Peugeot's Gilles Panizzi, his 3rd win in the World Rally Championship.

== Background ==
=== Entry list ===
No.	Driver	Co-Driver	Entrant	Car	Tyre
World Rally Championship manufacturer entries
2	(France) Didier Auriol	(France) Denis Giraudet	(France) Peugeot Total	Peugeot 206 WRC	MI
3	(Spain) Carlos Sainz	(Spain) Luis Moya	(United Kingdom) Ford Motor Co. Ltd.	Ford Focus RS WRC '01	P
4	(United Kingdom) Colin McRae	(United Kingdom) Nicky Grist	(United Kingdom) Ford Motor Co. Ltd.	Ford Focus RS WRC '01	P
5	(United Kingdom) Richard Burns	(United Kingdom) Robert Reid	(Japan) Subaru World Rally Team	Subaru Impreza S7 WRC '01	P
6	(Norway) Petter Solberg	(United Kingdom) Phil Mills	(Japan) Subaru World Rally Team	Subaru Impreza S7 WRC '01	P
7	(Finland) Tommi Mäkinen	(Finland) Risto Mannisenmäki	(Japan) Marlboro Mitsubishi Ralliart	Mitsubishi Lancer WRC	MI
8	(Belgium) Freddy Loix	(Belgium) Sven Smeets	(Japan) Marlboro Mitsubishi Ralliart	Mitsubishi Lancer WRC	MI
9	(Italy) Piero Liatti	(Italy) Carlo Cassina	(South Korea) Hyundai Castrol World Rally Team	Hyundai Accent WRC2	MI
10	(United Kingdom) Alister McRae	(United Kingdom) David Senior	(South Korea) Hyundai Castrol World Rally Team	Hyundai Accent WRC2	MI
11	(Germany) Armin Schwarz	(Germany) Manfred Hiemer	(Czech Republic) Škoda Motorsport	Škoda Octavia WRC Evo2	MI
12	(Belgium) Bruno Thiry	(Belgium) Georges Biar	(Czech Republic) Škoda Motorsport	Škoda Octavia WRC Evo2	MI
16	(France) Gilles Panizzi	(France) Hervé Panizzi	(France) Peugeot Total	Peugeot 206 WRC	MI
World Rally Championship entries
1	(Finland) Marcus Grönholm	(Finland) Timo Rautiainen	(France) Peugeot Total	Peugeot 206 WRC	MI
14	(France) Philippe Bugalski	(France) Jean-Paul Chiaroni	(France) Automobiles Citroën	Citroën Xsara WRC	MI
15	(Spain) Jesús Puras	(Spain) Marc Martí	(France) Automobiles Citroën	Citroën Xsara WRC	MI
17	(France) François Delecour	(France) Daniel Grataloup	(United Kingdom) Ford Motor Co. Ltd.	Ford Focus RS WRC '01	P
18	(Estonia) Markko Märtin	(United Kingdom) Michael Park	(Japan) Subaru World Rally Team	Subaru Impreza S7 WRC '01	P
19	(Japan) Toshihiro Arai	(Australia) Glenn Macneall	(Japan) Subaru World Rally Team	Subaru Impreza S7 WRC '01	P
20	(France) Sébastien Loeb	(Monaco) Daniel Elena	(France) Automobiles Citroën	Citroën Xsara WRC	MI
21	(Italy) Paolo Andreucci	(Italy) Alessandro Giusti	(United Kingdom) Ford Motor Co. Ltd.	Ford Focus RS WRC '01	P
22	(Czech Republic) Roman Kresta	(Czech Republic) Jan Tománek	(Czech Republic) Škoda Motorsport	Škoda Octavia WRC Evo2	MI
23	(Finland) Pasi Hagström	(Finland) Tero Gardemeister	Toyota Castrol Finland	Toyota Corolla WRC	—N/a
24	(Denmark) Henrik Lundgaard	(Denmark) Jens-Christian Anker	Toyota Castrol Team Denmark	Toyota Corolla WRC	—N/a
25	(Finland) Harri Rovanperä	(Finland) Risto Pietiläinen	(France) H.F. Grifone SRL	Peugeot 206 WRC	MI
26	(Italy) Renato Travaglia	(Italy) Flavio Zanella	(Italy) F.P.F. Sport	Peugeot 206 WRC	—N/a
27	(Italy) Piero Longhi	(Italy) Lucio Baggio	(Italy) Step 2	Toyota Corolla WRC	—N/a
28	(Oman) Hamed Al-Wahaibi	(New Zealand) Tony Sircombe	Oman Arab World Rally Team	Subaru Impreza S6 WRC '00	—N/a
29	(Saudi Arabia) Abdullah Bakhashab	(United Kingdom) Bobby Willis	Toyota Team Saudi Arabia	Toyota Corolla WRC	MI
30	(Austria) Achim Mörtl	(Austria) Stefan Eichhorner	(Austria) Promotor World Rally Team	Subaru Impreza S7 WRC '01	P
31	(France) Jean-Joseph Simon	(France) Jack Boyère	(France) Jean-Joseph Simon	Peugeot 206 WRC	—N/a
33	(Netherlands) Mark Breijer	(Netherlands) Hans van Goor	(Netherlands) Subaru Benelux	Subaru Impreza S5 WRC '98	—N/a
34	(Sweden) Daniel Carlsson	(Sweden) Benny Melander	(Sweden) Daniel Carlsson	Toyota Corolla WRC	—N/a
36	(United Kingdom) Nigel Heath	(United Kingdom) Steve Lancaster	(United Kingdom) World Rally HIRE	Subaru Impreza S5 WRC '99	—N/a
37	(Greece) Ioannis Papadimitriou	(United Kingdom) Chris Patterson	(Greece) Ioannis Papadimitriou	Subaru Impreza S6 WRC '00	—N/a
76	(Italy) Domenico Caldarola	(Italy) Paolo Cecchini	(Italy) Top Run	Toyota Corolla WRC	—N/a
77	(Italy) Diego Oldrati	(Italy) Danilo Fappani	(Italy) Procar Rally Team	Subaru Impreza S6 WRC '00	P
79	(Italy) Riccardo Errani	(Italy) Stefano Casadio	(Italy) Errani Team Group	Subaru Impreza 555	—N/a
Group N Cup entries
38	(Argentina) Gabriel Pozzo	(Argentina) Daniel Stillo	(Italy) Top Run	Mitsubishi Lancer Evo VI	P
39	(Argentina) Marcos Ligato	(Argentina) Rubén García	(Argentina) Marcos Ligato	Mitsubishi Lancer Evo VI	—N/a
40	(Uruguay) Gustavo Trelles	(Argentina) Jorge Del Buono	(Uruguay) Gustavo Trelles	Mitsubishi Lancer Evo VI	—N/a
41	(Sweden) Stig Blomqvist	(Venezuela) Ana Goñi	(United Kingdom) David Sutton Cars Ltd	Mitsubishi Lancer Evo VI	—N/a
42	(United Kingdom) Natalie Barratt	(United Kingdom) Michael Gibson	(United Kingdom) Natalie Barratt Rallysport	Mitsubishi Lancer Evo VI	—N/a
78	(Italy) Alessandro Fiorio	(Italy) Enrico Cantoni	(Italy) Ralliart Italia	Mitsubishi Carisma GT Evo VI	—N/a
83	(Italy) Mario Stagni	(Italy) Roberto Paganoni	(Italy) Ralliart Italia	Mitsubishi Lancer Evo VI	—N/a
84	(United Kingdom) Nigel Hicklin	(United Kingdom) Sam McMullan	(United Kingdom) Nigel Hicklin	Mitsubishi Lancer Evo V	—N/a
85	(Italy) Alfredo De Dominicis	(Italy) Alessandro Mari	(Italy) Alfredo De Dominicis	Mitsubishi Lancer Evo VI	—N/a
86	(Italy) Mirco Virag	(Italy) Massimo Bergna	(Italy) Mirco Virag	Mitsubishi Lancer Evo VI	—N/a
87	(Italy) Eugenio Lozza	(Italy) Antonella Fiorendi	(Italy) Ciemme Racing	Renault Clio RS	—N/a
88	(Italy) Davide Giordano	(Italy) Ezio Sichi	(Italy) ACN Forze di Polizia	Peugeot 306	—N/a
89	(Italy) Alessandro Gai	(Italy) Franco Giusti	(Italy) Pistoia Corse	Citroën Saxo VTS	—N/a
Super 1600 Cup entries
50	(Austria) Manfred Stohl	(Austria) Ilka Minor	(Italy) Top Run SRL	Fiat Punto S1600	—N/a
51	(France) Patrick Magaud	(France) Guylène Brun	(United Kingdom) Ford Motor Co. Ltd.	Ford Puma S1600	—N/a
52	(Italy) Andrea Dallavilla	(Italy) Giovanni Bernacchini	(Italy) R&D Motorsport	Fiat Punto S1600	—N/a
54	(Belgium) Larry Cols	(Belgium) Yasmine Gerard	(Belgium) Peugeot Bastos Racing	Peugeot 206 S1600	—N/a
55	(United Kingdom) Niall McShea	(United Kingdom) Michael Orr	(France) Citroën Sport	Citroën Saxo S1600	—N/a
56	(Italy) Giandomenico Basso	(Italy) Flavio Guglielmini	(Italy) Top Run SRL	Fiat Punto S1600	—N/a
57	(France) Cédric Robert	(France) Marie-Pierre Billoux	(France) Team Gamma	Peugeot 206 S1600	—N/a
58	(Spain) Sergio Vallejo	(Spain) Diego Vallejo	(Spain) Pronto Racing	Fiat Punto S1600	—N/a
59	(France) Benoît Rousselot	(France) Gilles Mondésir	(United Kingdom) Ford Motor Co. Ltd.	Ford Puma S1600	—N/a
61	(Italy) Corrado Fontana	(Italy) Renzo Casazza	(Italy) H.F. Grifone SRL	Peugeot 206 S1600	—N/a
62	(Finland) Jussi Välimäki	(Finland) Jakke Honkanen	(Finland) ST Motors	Peugeot 206 S1600	—N/a
63	(Norway) Martin Stenshorne	(United Kingdom) Clive Jenkins	(Norway) Zeta Racing	Ford Puma S1600	—N/a
64	(Italy) Massimo Macaluso	(Italy) Antonio Celot	(Italy) R&D Motorsport	Fiat Punto S1600	—N/a
65	(Paraguay) Alejandro Galanti	(Spain) Xavier Amigó	(Italy) Astra Racing	Ford Puma S1600	—N/a
67	(Andorra) Albert Llovera	(Spain) Marc Corral	(Spain) Pronto Racing	Fiat Punto S1600	—N/a
68	(Italy) Massimo Ceccato	(Italy) Mitia Dotta	(Italy) Hawk Racing Club	Fiat Punto S1600	—N/a
69	(France) Nicolas Bernardi	(France) Delphine Bernardi	(France) Team Gamma	Peugeot 206 S1600	—N/a
71	(Belgium) François Duval	(Belgium) Jean-Marc Fortin	(United Kingdom) Ford Motor Co. Ltd.	Ford Puma S1600	—N/a
72	(Malaysia) Saladin Mazlan	(United Kingdom) Timothy Sturla	(Malaysia) Saladin Rallying	Ford Puma S1600	—N/a
73	(Italy) Christian Chemin	(Italy) Simone Scattolin	(Italy) Hawk Racing Club	Fiat Punto S1600	—N/a

=== Itinerary ===
All dates and times are CEST (UTC+2).

Date	Time	No.	Stage name	Distance
Leg 1 — 138.45 km
5 October	08:24	SS1	Coldirodi 1	12.41 km
5 October	09:12	SS2	Langan 1	25.29 km
5 October	09:51	SS3	Rezzo 1	12.29 km
5 October	11:50	SS4	San Bernardo 1	19.44 km
5 October	12:45	SS5	Nava 1	19.03 km
5 October	15:50	SS6	Coldirodi 2	12.41 km
5 October	16:38	SS7	Langan 2	25.29 km
5 October	17:17	SS8	Rezzo 2	12.29 km
Leg 2 — 142.01 km
6 October	08:07	SS9	Passo Teglia 1	14.32 km
6 October	08:32	SS10	Molini 1	25.29 km
6 October	09:35	SS11	Perinaldo 1	12.16 km
6 October	11:52	SS12	San Bernardo 2	19.44 km
6 October	12:47	SS13	Nava 2	19.03 km
6 October	15:35	SS14	Passo Teglia 2	14.32 km
6 October	16:00	SS15	Molini 2	25.29 km
6 October	17:03	SS16	Perinaldo 2	12.16 km
Leg 3 — 87.66 km
7 October	08:32	SS17	San Romolo 1	28.64 km
7 October	09:45	SS18	Colle d'Oggia 1	15.19 km
7 October	12:33	SS19	San Romolo 2	28.64 km
7 October	13:46	SS20	Colle d'Oggia 2	15.19 km

== Results ==
=== Overall ===
Pos.	No.	Driver	Co-driver	Team	Car	Time	Difference	Points
1	16	(France) Gilles Panizzi	(France) Hervé Panizzi	(France) Peugeot Total	Peugeot 206 WRC	4:05:49.5		10
2	20	(France) Sébastien Loeb	(Monaco) Daniel Elena	(France) Automobiles Citroën	Citroën Xsara WRC	4:06:00.9	+11.4	6
3	2	(France) Didier Auriol	(France) Denis Giraudet	(France) Peugeot Total	Peugeot 206 WRC	4:06:44.4	+54.9	4
4	3	(Spain) Carlos Sainz	(Spain) Luis Moya	(United Kingdom) Ford Motor Co. Ltd.	Ford Focus RS WRC '01	4:07:01.4	+1:11.9	3
5	26	(Italy) Renato Travaglia	(Italy) Flavio Zanella	(Italy) F.P.F. Sport	Peugeot 206 WRC	4:07:21.6	+1:32.1	2
6	17	(France) François Delecour	(France) Daniel Grataloup	(United Kingdom) Ford Motor Co. Ltd.	Ford Focus RS WRC '01	4:08:18.1	+2:28.6	1

=== World Rally Cars ===
==== Classification ====
Position		No.	Driver	Co-driver	Entrant	Car	Time	Difference	Points
Event	Class	No.	Driver	Co-driver	Entrant	Car	Time	Difference	Points
1	1	16	(France) Gilles Panizzi	(France) Hervé Panizzi	(France) Peugeot Total	Peugeot 206 WRC	4:05:49.5		10
3	2	2	(France) Didier Auriol	(France) Denis Giraudet	(France) Peugeot Total	Peugeot 206 WRC	4:06:44.4	+54.9	4
4	3	3	(Spain) Carlos Sainz	(Spain) Luis Moya	(United Kingdom) Ford Motor Co. Ltd.	Ford Focus RS WRC '01	4:07:01.4	+1:11.9	3
8	4	4	(United Kingdom) Colin McRae	(United Kingdom) Nicky Grist	(United Kingdom) Ford Motor Co. Ltd.	Ford Focus RS WRC '01	4:09:43.2	+3:53.7	0
9	5	6	(Norway) Petter Solberg	(United Kingdom) Phil Mills	(Japan) Subaru World Rally Team	Subaru Impreza S7 WRC '01	4:09:49.4	+3:59.9	0
12	6	8	(Belgium) Freddy Loix	(Belgium) Sven Smeets	(Japan) Marlboro Mitsubishi Ralliart	Mitsubishi Lancer WRC	4:12:57.2	+7:07.7	0
13	7	12	(Belgium) Bruno Thiry	(Belgium) Georges Biar	(Czech Republic) Škoda Motorsport	Škoda Octavia WRC Evo2	4:13:15.4	+7:25.9	0
Retired SS19		7	(Finland) Tommi Mäkinen	(Finland) Risto Mannisenmäki	(Japan) Marlboro Mitsubishi Ralliart	Mitsubishi Lancer WRC	Lost wheel		0
Retired SS16		10	(United Kingdom) Alister McRae	(United Kingdom) David Senior	(South Korea) Hyundai Castrol World Rally Team	Hyundai Accent WRC2	Brakes		0
Retired SS1		5	(United Kingdom) Richard Burns	(United Kingdom) Robert Reid	(Japan) Subaru World Rally Team	Subaru Impreza S7 WRC '01	Accident		0
Retired SS1		9	(Italy) Piero Liatti	(Italy) Carlo Cassina	(South Korea) Hyundai Castrol World Rally Team	Hyundai Accent WRC2	Accident		0
Retired SS1		11	(Germany) Armin Schwarz	(Germany) Manfred Hiemer	(Czech Republic) Škoda Motorsport	Škoda Octavia WRC Evo2	Alternator		0

==== Special stages ====
Day	Stage	Stage name	Length	Winner	Car	Time	Class leaders
Leg 1 (5 Oct)	SS1	Coldirodi 1	12.41 km	(France) Gilles Panizzi	Peugeot 206 WRC	7:55.7	(France) Gilles Panizzi
Leg 1 (5 Oct)	SS2	Langan 1	25.29 km	(Spain) Jesús Puras	Citroën Xsara WRC	16:48.2	(Spain) Jesús Puras
Leg 1 (5 Oct)	SS3	Rezzo 1	12.29 km	(France) Gilles Panizzi	Peugeot 206 WRC	9:12.4	(Spain) Jesús Puras
Leg 1 (5 Oct)	SS4	San Bernardo 1	19.44 km	(Spain) Jesús Puras	Citroën Xsara WRC	11:34.8	(Spain) Jesús Puras
Leg 1 (5 Oct)	SS5	Nava 1	19.03 km	(France) Philippe Bugalski	Citroën Xsara WRC	12:00.5	(France) Gilles Panizzi
Leg 1 (5 Oct)	SS6	Coldirodi 2	12.41 km	(France) Philippe Bugalski	Citroën Xsara WRC	7:53.5	(France) Gilles Panizzi
Leg 1 (5 Oct)	SS7	Langan 2	25.29 km	(Spain) Jesús Puras	Citroën Xsara WRC	16:41.9	(Spain) Jesús Puras
Leg 1 (5 Oct)	SS8	Rezzo 2	12.29 km	(France) Philippe Bugalski	Citroën Xsara WRC	9:11.2	(Spain) Jesús Puras
Leg 2 (6 Oct)	SS9	Passo Teglia 1	14.32 km	(Spain) Jesús Puras	Citroën Xsara WRC	10:25.6	(Spain) Jesús Puras
Leg 2 (6 Oct)	SS10	Molini 1	25.29 km	(France) Sébastien Loeb	Citroën Xsara WRC	16:52.6	(France) Gilles Panizzi
Leg 2 (6 Oct)	SS11	Perinaldo 1	12.16 km	(France) Didier Auriol	Peugeot 206 WRC	7:43.9	(France) Gilles Panizzi
Leg 2 (6 Oct)	SS12	San Bernardo 2	19.44 km	(Norway) Petter Solberg	Subaru Impreza S7 WRC '01	11:35.8	(France) Gilles Panizzi
Leg 2 (6 Oct)	SS13	Nava 2	19.03 km	(France) Gilles Panizzi	Peugeot 206 WRC	11:58.0	(France) Gilles Panizzi
Leg 2 (6 Oct)	SS14	Passo Teglia 2	14.32 km	(France) Didier Auriol	Peugeot 206 WRC	10:23.0	(France) Gilles Panizzi
Leg 2 (6 Oct)	SS15	Molini 2	25.29 km	(France) Sébastien Loeb	Citroën Xsara WRC	16:43.7	(France) Gilles Panizzi
Leg 2 (6 Oct)	SS16	Perinaldo 2	12.16 km	(France) Gilles Panizzi	Peugeot 206 WRC	7:41.6	(France) Gilles Panizzi
Leg 3 (7 Oct)	SS17	San Romolo 1	28.64 km	(France) Sébastien Loeb	Citroën Xsara WRC	19:04.7	(France) Gilles Panizzi
Leg 3 (7 Oct)	SS18	Colle d'Oggia 1	15.19 km	(Spain) Carlos Sainz	Ford Focus RS WRC '01	10:04.3	(France) Gilles Panizzi
Leg 3 (7 Oct)	SS19	San Romolo 2	28.64 km	(France) Sébastien Loeb	Citroën Xsara WRC	20:20.6	(France) Gilles Panizzi
Leg 3 (7 Oct)	SS20	Colle d'Oggia 2	15.19 km	(France) François Delecour	Ford Focus RS WRC '01	10:13.0	(France) Gilles Panizzi

==== Championship standings ====
Pos.	Drivers' championships			Co-drivers' championships			Manufacturers' championships		
Pos.	Move	Driver	Points	Move	Co-driver	Points	Move	Manufacturer	Points
1		(United Kingdom) Colin McRae	40		(United Kingdom) Nicky Grist	40		(United Kingdom) Ford Motor Co. Ltd.	83
2		(Finland) Tommi Mäkinen	40		(Finland) Risto Mannisenmäki	40		(Japan) Marlboro Mitsubishi Ralliart	67
3	1	(Spain) Carlos Sainz	33	1	(Spain) Luis Moya	33	1	(France) Peugeot Total	60
4	1	(United Kingdom) Richard Burns	31	1	(United Kingdom) Robert Reid	31	1	(Japan) Subaru World Rally Team	48
5		(Finland) Harri Rovanperä	27		(Finland) Risto Pietiläinen	27		(Czech Republic) Škoda Motorsport	15

=== FIA Cup for Production Rally Drivers ===
==== Classification ====
Position		No.	Driver	Co-driver	Entrant	Car	Time	Difference	Points
Event	Class	No.	Driver	Co-driver	Entrant	Car	Time	Difference	Points
17	1	78	(Italy) Alessandro Fiorio	(Italy) Enrico Cantoni	(Italy) Ralliart Italia	Mitsubishi Carisma GT Evo VI	4:28:20.3		10
23	2	38	(Argentina) Gabriel Pozzo	(Argentina) Daniel Stillo	(Italy) Top Run	Mitsubishi Lancer Evo VI	4:33:29.0	+5:08.7	6
28	3	85	(Italy) Alfredo De Dominicis	(Italy) Alessandro Mari	(Italy) Alfredo De Dominicis	Mitsubishi Lancer Evo VI	4:35:39.0	+7:18.7	4
30	4	41	(Sweden) Stig Blomqvist	(Venezuela) Ana Goñi	(United Kingdom) David Sutton Cars Ltd	Mitsubishi Lancer Evo VI	4:46:13.0	+17:52.7	3
31	5	87	(Italy) Eugenio Lozza	(Italy) Antonella Fiorendi	(Italy) Ciemme Racing	Renault Clio RS	4:50:35.2	+22:14.9	2
34	6	86	(Italy) Mirco Virag	(Italy) Massimo Bergna	(Italy) Mirco Virag	Mitsubishi Lancer Evo VI	4:54:54.3	+26:34.0	1
36	7	88	(Italy) Davide Giordano	(Italy) Ezio Sichi	(Italy) ACN Forze di Polizia	Peugeot 306	5:13:03.6	+44:43.3	0
37	8	89	(Italy) Alessandro Gai	(Italy) Franco Giusti	(Italy) Pistoia Corse	Citroën Saxo VTS	5:23:08.8	+54:48.5	0
Retired SS19		40	(Uruguay) Gustavo Trelles	(Argentina) Jorge Del Buono	(Uruguay) Gustavo Trelles	Mitsubishi Lancer Evo VI	Accident		0
Retired SS19		84	(United Kingdom) Nigel Hicklin	(United Kingdom) Sam McMullan	(United Kingdom) Nigel Hicklin	Mitsubishi Lancer Evo V	Mechanical		0
Retired SS15		83	(Italy) Mario Stagni	(Italy) Roberto Paganoni	(Italy) Ralliart Italia	Mitsubishi Lancer Evo VI	Mechanical		0
Retired SS12		42	(United Kingdom) Natalie Barratt	(United Kingdom) Michael Gibson	(United Kingdom) Natalie Barratt Rallysport	Mitsubishi Lancer Evo VI	Mechanical		0
Retired SS10		39	(Argentina) Marcos Ligato	(Argentina) Rubén García	(Argentina) Marcos Ligato	Mitsubishi Lancer Evo VI	Mechanical		0

==== Special stages ====
Day	Stage	Stage name	Length	Winner	Car	Time	Class leaders
Leg 1 (5 Oct)	SS1	Coldirodi 1	12.41 km	(Italy) Alessandro Fiorio	Mitsubishi Carisma GT Evo VI	8:40.1	(Italy) Alessandro Fiorio
Leg 1 (5 Oct)	SS2	Langan 1	25.29 km	(Italy) Alessandro Fiorio	Mitsubishi Carisma GT Evo VI	18:29.7	(Italy) Alessandro Fiorio
Leg 1 (5 Oct)	SS3	Rezzo 1	12.29 km	(Italy) Alessandro Fiorio	Mitsubishi Carisma GT Evo VI	9:59.5	(Italy) Alessandro Fiorio
Leg 1 (5 Oct)	SS4	San Bernardo 1	19.44 km	(Uruguay) Gustavo Trelles	Mitsubishi Lancer Evo VI	12:47.1	(Italy) Alessandro Fiorio
Leg 1 (5 Oct)	SS5	Nava 1	19.03 km	(Italy) Alessandro Fiorio	Mitsubishi Carisma GT Evo VI	13:14.9	(Italy) Alessandro Fiorio
Leg 1 (5 Oct)	SS6	Coldirodi 2	12.41 km	(Italy) Alessandro Fiorio	Mitsubishi Carisma GT Evo VI	8:39.6	(Italy) Alessandro Fiorio
Leg 1 (5 Oct)	SS7	Langan 2	25.29 km	(Italy) Alessandro Fiorio	Mitsubishi Carisma GT Evo VI	18:32.5	(Italy) Alessandro Fiorio
Leg 1 (5 Oct)	SS8	Rezzo 2	12.29 km	(Italy) Alessandro Fiorio	Mitsubishi Carisma GT Evo VI	10:25.4	(Italy) Alessandro Fiorio
Leg 2 (6 Oct)	SS9	Passo Teglia 1	14.32 km	(Argentina) Marcos Ligato	Mitsubishi Lancer Evo VI	11:24.2	(Italy) Alessandro Fiorio
Leg 2 (6 Oct)	SS10	Molini 1	25.29 km	(Italy) Mario Stagni	Mitsubishi Lancer Evo VI	18:29.0	(Italy) Alessandro Fiorio
Leg 2 (6 Oct)	SS11	Perinaldo 1	12.16 km	(Italy) Mario Stagni	Mitsubishi Lancer Evo VI	8:24.6	(Italy) Alessandro Fiorio
Leg 2 (6 Oct)	SS12	San Bernardo 2	19.44 km	Notional stage time			(Italy) Alessandro Fiorio
Leg 2 (6 Oct)	SS13	Nava 2	19.03 km	Notional stage time			(Italy) Alessandro Fiorio
Leg 2 (6 Oct)	SS14	Passo Teglia 2	14.32 km	(Italy) Mario Stagni	Mitsubishi Lancer Evo VI	11:21.2	(Italy) Alessandro Fiorio
Leg 2 (6 Oct)	SS15	Molini 2	25.29 km	(Italy) Alessandro Fiorio	Mitsubishi Carisma GT Evo VI	18:26.9	(Italy) Alessandro Fiorio
Leg 2 (6 Oct)	SS16	Perinaldo 2	12.16 km	(Uruguay) Gustavo Trelles	Mitsubishi Lancer Evo VI	8:22.9	(Italy) Alessandro Fiorio
Leg 3 (7 Oct)	SS17	San Romolo 1	28.64 km	(Uruguay) Gustavo Trelles	Mitsubishi Lancer Evo VI	20:43.9	(Italy) Alessandro Fiorio
Leg 3 (7 Oct)	SS18	Colle d'Oggia 1	15.19 km	(Uruguay) Gustavo Trelles	Mitsubishi Lancer Evo VI	10:29.2	(Uruguay) Gustavo Trelles
Leg 3 (7 Oct)	SS19	San Romolo 2	28.64 km	(Italy) Alessandro Fiorio	Mitsubishi Carisma GT Evo VI	23:09.4	(Italy) Alessandro Fiorio
Leg 3 (7 Oct)	SS20	Colle d'Oggia 2	15.19 km	(Italy) Alessandro Fiorio	Mitsubishi Carisma GT Evo VI	11:11.5	(Italy) Alessandro Fiorio

==== Championship standings ====
- **Bold text** indicates 2001 World Champions.

Pos.	Drivers' championships		
Pos.	Move	Driver	Points
1		(Argentina) **Gabriel Pozzo**	65
2		(Uruguay) Gustavo Trelles	26
3		(Austria) Manfred Stohl	22
4		(Argentina) Marcos Ligato	22
5		(Sweden) Stig Blomqvist	14

=== FIA Cup for Super 1600 Drivers ===
==== Classification ====
Position		No.	Driver	Co-driver	Entrant	Car	Time	Difference	Points
Event	Class	No.	Driver	Co-driver	Entrant	Car	Time	Difference	Points
16	1	52	(Italy) Andrea Dallavilla	(Italy) Giovanni Bernacchini	(Italy) R&D Motorsport	Fiat Punto S1600	4:24:14.8		10
18	2	71	(Belgium) François Duval	(Belgium) Jean-Marc Fortin	(United Kingdom) Ford Motor Co. Ltd.	Ford Puma S1600	4:28:42.1	+4:27.3	6
19	3	54	(Belgium) Larry Cols	(Belgium) Yasmine Gerard	(Belgium) Peugeot Bastos Racing	Peugeot 206 S1600	4:29:28.9	+5:14.1	4
20	4	55	(United Kingdom) Niall McShea	(United Kingdom) Michael Orr	(France) Citroën Sport	Citroën Saxo S1600	4:30:23.3	+6:08.5	3
21	5	51	(France) Patrick Magaud	(France) Guylène Brun	(United Kingdom) Ford Motor Co. Ltd.	Ford Puma S1600	4:30:46.8	+6:32.0	2
22	6	58	(Spain) Sergio Vallejo	(Spain) Diego Vallejo	(Spain) Pronto Racing	Fiat Punto S1600	4:33:25.8	+9:11.0	1
24	7	61	(Italy) Corrado Fontana	(Italy) Renzo Casazza	(Italy) H.F. Grifone SRL	Peugeot 206 S1600	4:34:08.6	+9:53.8	0
27	8	63	(Norway) Martin Stenshorne	(United Kingdom) Clive Jenkins	(Norway) Zeta Racing	Ford Puma S1600	4:35:21.9	+11:07.1	0
29	9	59	(France) Benoît Rousselot	(France) Gilles Mondésir	(United Kingdom) Ford Motor Co. Ltd.	Ford Puma S1600	4:40:27.4	+16:12.6	0
32	10	64	(Italy) Massimo Macaluso	(Italy) Antonio Celot	(Italy) R&D Motorsport	Fiat Punto S1600	4:53:53.6	+29:38.8	0
33	11	72	(Malaysia) Saladin Mazlan	(United Kingdom) Timothy Sturla	(Malaysia) Saladin Rallying	Ford Puma S1600	4:54:33.6	+30:18.8	0
35	12	65	(Paraguay) Alejandro Galanti	(Spain) Xavier Amigó	(Italy) Astra Racing	Ford Puma S1600	4:59:18.3	+35:03.5	0
Retired SS19		56	(Italy) Giandomenico Basso	(Italy) Flavio Guglielmini	(Italy) Top Run SRL	Fiat Punto S1600	Accident		0
Retired SS19		57	(France) Cédric Robert	(France) Marie-Pierre Billoux	(France) Team Gamma	Peugeot 206 S1600	Accident		0
Retired SS19		67	(Andorra) Albert Llovera	(Spain) Marc Corral	(Spain) Pronto Racing	Fiat Punto S1600	Transmission		0
Retired SS14		50	(Austria) Manfred Stohl	(Austria) Ilka Minor	(Italy) Top Run SRL	Fiat Punto S1600	Driveshaft		0
Retired SS10		68	(Italy) Massimo Ceccato	(Italy) Mitia Dotta	(Italy) Hawk Racing Club	Fiat Punto S1600	Accident		0
Retired SS9		62	(Finland) Jussi Välimäki	(Finland) Jakke Honkanen	(Finland) ST Motors	Peugeot 206 S1600	Fuel pressure		0
Retired SS9		69	(France) Nicolas Bernardi	(France) Delphine Bernardi	(France) Team Gamma	Peugeot 206 S1600	Accident		0
Retired SS2		73	(Italy) Christian Chemin	(Italy) Simone Scattolin	(Italy) Hawk Racing Club	Fiat Punto S1600	Mechanical		0

==== Special stages ====
Day	Stage	Stage name	Length	Winner	Car	Time	Class leaders
Leg 1 (5 Oct)	SS1	Coldirodi 1	12.41 km	(Italy) Andrea Dallavilla	Fiat Punto S1600	8:32.8	(Italy) Andrea Dallavilla
Leg 1 (5 Oct)	SS2	Langan 1	25.29 km	(Italy) Andrea Dallavilla	Fiat Punto S1600	18:13.8	(Italy) Andrea Dallavilla
Leg 1 (5 Oct)	SS3	Rezzo 1	12.29 km	(Italy) Andrea Dallavilla	Fiat Punto S1600	9:56.9	(Italy) Andrea Dallavilla
Leg 1 (5 Oct)	SS4	San Bernardo 1	19.44 km	(Italy) Andrea Dallavilla	Fiat Punto S1600	12:33.9	(Italy) Andrea Dallavilla
Leg 1 (5 Oct)	SS5	Nava 1	19.03 km	(France) Cédric Robert	Peugeot 206 S1600	12:56.1	(Italy) Andrea Dallavilla
Leg 1 (5 Oct)	SS6	Coldirodi 2	12.41 km	(Italy) Andrea Dallavilla	Fiat Punto S1600	8:31.8	(Italy) Andrea Dallavilla
Leg 1 (5 Oct)	SS7	Langan 2	25.29 km	(France) Cédric Robert	Peugeot 206 S1600	18:08.9	(Italy) Andrea Dallavilla
Leg 1 (5 Oct)	SS8	Rezzo 2	12.29 km	(Italy) Andrea Dallavilla	Fiat Punto S1600	10:05.5	(Italy) Andrea Dallavilla
Leg 2 (6 Oct)	SS9	Passo Teglia 1	14.32 km	(Italy) Andrea Dallavilla	Fiat Punto S1600	11:17.8	(Italy) Andrea Dallavilla
Leg 2 (6 Oct)	SS10	Molini 1	25.29 km	(France) Cédric Robert	Peugeot 206 S1600	18:01.7	(Italy) Andrea Dallavilla
Leg 2 (6 Oct)	SS11	Perinaldo 1	12.16 km	(Italy) Andrea Dallavilla	Fiat Punto S1600	8:18.5	(Italy) Andrea Dallavilla
Leg 2 (6 Oct)	SS12	San Bernardo 2	19.44 km	Notional stage time			(Italy) Andrea Dallavilla
Leg 2 (6 Oct)	SS13	Nava 2	19.03 km	Notional stage time			(Italy) Andrea Dallavilla
Leg 2 (6 Oct)	SS14	Passo Teglia 2	14.32 km	(France) Cédric Robert	Peugeot 206 S1600	11:17.0	(Italy) Andrea Dallavilla
Leg 2 (6 Oct)	SS15	Molini 2	25.29 km	(France) Cédric Robert	Peugeot 206 S1600	18:03.8	(Italy) Andrea Dallavilla
Leg 2 (6 Oct)	SS16	Perinaldo 2	12.16 km	(Italy) Andrea Dallavilla	Fiat Punto S1600	8:15.7	(Italy) Andrea Dallavilla
Leg 3 (7 Oct)	SS17	San Romolo 1	28.64 km	(Italy) Andrea Dallavilla	Fiat Punto S1600	20:27.9	(Italy) Andrea Dallavilla
Leg 3 (7 Oct)	SS18	Colle d'Oggia 1	15.19 km	(France) Cédric Robert	Peugeot 206 S1600	10:46.3	(Italy) Andrea Dallavilla
Leg 3 (7 Oct)	SS19	San Romolo 2	28.64 km	(Italy) Andrea Dallavilla	Fiat Punto S1600	22:51.4	(Italy) Andrea Dallavilla
Leg 3 (7 Oct)	SS20	Colle d'Oggia 2	15.19 km	(Belgium) François Duval	Ford Puma S1600	10:37.3	(Italy) Andrea Dallavilla

==== Championship standings ====
Pos.	Drivers' championships		
Pos.	Move	Driver	Points
1		(France) Sébastien Loeb	30
2		(Italy) Andrea Dallavilla	24
3		(Norway) Martin Stenshorne	7
4	4	(Belgium) Larry Cols	7
5	1	(Italy) Giandomenico Basso	6
