= 2001 Cyprus Rally =

6th round of the 2001 World Rally Championship

2001 Cyprus Rally 29th Cyprus Rally
Round 6 of the 2001 World Rally Championship season
← Previous event	Next event →
- Host country: Cyprus
- Rally base: Limassol
- Dates run: June 1, 2001 – June 3, 2001
- Stages: 22 (341.38 km; 212.12 miles)
- Stage surface: Gravel
- Overall distance: 1,252.51 km (778.27 miles)

Statistics
- Crews: 76 at start, 30 at finish

Overall results
- Overall winner: (United Kingdom) Colin McRae (United Kingdom) Nicky Grist (United Kingdom) Ford Motor Co. Ltd. Ford Focus RS WRC '01

The 2001 Cyprus Rally (formally the 29th Cyprus Rally) was the sixth round of the 2001 World Rally Championship. The race was held over three days between 1 June and 3 June 2001, and was won by Ford's Colin McRae, his 22nd win in the World Rally Championship.

== Background ==
=== Entry list ===
No.	Driver	Co-Driver	Entrant	Car	Tyre
World Rally Championship manufacturer entries
1	(Finland) Marcus Grönholm	(Finland) Timo Rautiainen	(France) Peugeot Total	Peugeot 206 WRC	M
2	(France) Didier Auriol	(France) Denis Giraudet	(France) Peugeot Total	Peugeot 206 WRC	M
3	(Spain) Carlos Sainz	(Spain) Luis Moya	(United Kingdom) Ford Motor Co. Ltd.	Ford Focus RS WRC '01	P
4	(United Kingdom) Colin McRae	(United Kingdom) Nicky Grist	(United Kingdom) Ford Motor Co. Ltd.	Ford Focus RS WRC '01	P
5	(United Kingdom) Richard Burns	(United Kingdom) Robert Reid	(Japan) Subaru World Rally Team	Subaru Impreza S7 WRC '01	P
6	(Norway) Petter Solberg	(United Kingdom) Phil Mills	(Japan) Subaru World Rally Team	Subaru Impreza S7 WRC '01	P
7	(Finland) Tommi Mäkinen	(Finland) Risto Mannisenmäki	(Japan) Marlboro Mitsubishi Ralliart	Mitsubishi Lancer Evo 6.5	M
8	(Belgium) Freddy Loix	(Belgium) Sven Smeets	(Japan) Marlboro Mitsubishi Ralliart	Mitsubishi Carisma GT Evo VI	M
9	(Sweden) Kenneth Eriksson	(Sweden) Staffan Parmander	(South Korea) Hyundai Castrol World Rally Team	Hyundai Accent WRC2	M
10	(United Kingdom) Alister McRae	(United Kingdom) David Senior	(South Korea) Hyundai Castrol World Rally Team	Hyundai Accent WRC2	M
11	(Germany) Armin Schwarz	(Germany) Manfred Hiemer	(Czech Republic) Škoda Motorsport	Škoda Octavia WRC Evo2	M
12	(Belgium) Bruno Thiry	(Belgium) Stéphane Prévot	(Czech Republic) Škoda Motorsport	Škoda Octavia WRC Evo2	M
World Rally Championship entries
16	(Finland) Harri Rovanperä	(Finland) Risto Pietiläinen	(France) Peugeot Total	Peugeot 206 WRC	M
17	(France) François Delecour	(France) Daniel Grataloup	(United Kingdom) Ford Motor Co. Ltd.	Ford Focus RS WRC '01	P
18	(Japan) Toshihiro Arai	(Australia) Glenn Macneall	(Japan) Subaru World Rally Team	Subaru Impreza S7 WRC '01	P
19	(Japan) Katsuhiko Taguchi	(United Kingdom) Derek Ringer	(Japan) Marlboro Mitsubishi Ralliart	Mitsubishi Lancer Evo 6.5	M
20	(Italy) Piero Liatti	(Italy) Carlo Cassina	(South Korea) Hyundai Castrol World Rally Team	Hyundai Accent WRC2	M
21	(France) Gilles Panizzi	(France) Hervé Panizzi	(France) H.F. Grifone SRL	Peugeot 206 WRC	M
22	(France) Frédéric Dor	(France) Didier Breton	(France) F. Dor Rally Team	Subaru Impreza S6 WRC '00	—N/a
23	(Spain) Marc Blázquez	(Spain) Jordi Mercader	(Spain) Seat Sport	Seat Cordoba WRC Evo3	P
24	(France) Jean-Joseph Simon	(France) Jack Boyère	(France) Jean-Joseph Simon	Peugeot 206 WRC	M
25	(Denmark) Henrik Lundgaard	(Denmark) Jens-Christian Anker	Toyota Castrol Team Denmark	Toyota Corolla WRC	—N/a
26	(Finland) Pasi Hagström	(Finland) Tero Gardemeister	Toyota Castrol Finland	Toyota Corolla WRC	—N/a
27	(Oman) Hamed Al-Wahaibi	(New Zealand) Tony Sircombe	Oman Arab World Rally Team	Subaru Impreza S6 WRC '00	—N/a
28	(Saudi Arabia) Abdullah Bakhashab	(United Kingdom) Bobby Willis	Toyota Team Saudi Arabia	Toyota Corolla WRC	M
32	(Greece) Ioannis Papadimitriou	(United Kingdom) Chris Patterson	(Greece) Ioannis Papadimitriou	Peugeot 206 WRC	—N/a
34	(United Kingdom) Nigel Heath	(United Kingdom) Steve Lancaster	(United Kingdom) World Rally HIRE	Subaru Impreza S5 WRC '99	—N/a
39	(Belgium) Kris Princen	(Belgium) Dany Colebunders	(Belgium) Peugeot Bastos Racing	Peugeot 206 WRC	—N/a
40	(United Kingdom) Neil Wearden	(United Kingdom) Trevor Agnew	(United Kingdom) Neil Wearden	Peugeot 206 WRC	—N/a
41	(Cyprus) Andreas Tsouloftas	(Cyprus) Andreas Achilleos	(Cyprus) Fairways Rally Team	Mitsubishi Lancer Evo VI	—N/a
42	(Cyprus) Chris Thomas	(Cyprus) Andreas Christodoulides	(Cyprus) Chris Thomas	Mitsubishi Lancer Evo VI	—N/a
43	(Lebanon) Michel Saleh	(Cyprus) Adamos Gregoriou	(United Arab Emirates) Damas UAE Rally Team	Toyota Celica GT-Four	—N/a
46	(Cyprus) Paraskevas Paraskeva	(Cyprus) Ioánnis Konstantinou	(Cyprus) Paraskevas Paraskeva	Mitsubishi Lancer Evo V	—N/a
56	(Italy) Riccardo Errani	(Italy) Stefano Casadio	(Italy) Riccardo Errani	Subaru Impreza 555	—N/a
57	(Italy) Giovanni Recordati	(Monaco) Freddy Delorme	(Italy) Giovanni Recordati	Toyota Corolla WRC	—N/a
58	(Cyprus) Marios E Panayiotou	(Cyprus) Phanos Christofi	(Cyprus) Marios E Panayiotou	Mitsubishi Lancer Evo VI	—N/a
68	(Cyprus) Nicos Antoniades	(Cyprus) Giorgos Economides	(Cyprus) Nicos Antoniades	Subaru Impreza 555	—N/a
Group N Cup entries
29	(Uruguay) Gustavo Trelles	(Argentina) Jorge Del Buono	(Uruguay) Gustavo Trelles	Mitsubishi Lancer Evo VI	P
30	(Austria) Manfred Stohl	(Austria) Peter Müller	(Austria) Manfred Stohl	Mitsubishi Lancer Evo VI	—N/a
31	(Sweden) Stig Blomqvist	(Venezuela) Ana Goñi	(United Kingdom) David Sutton Cars Ltd	Mitsubishi Lancer Evo VI	—N/a
33	(Argentina) Gabriel Pozzo	(Argentina) Daniel Stillo	(Italy) Top Run SRL	Mitsubishi Lancer Evo VI	—N/a
35	(Argentina) Marcos Ligato	(Argentina) Rubén García	(Italy) Top Run SRL	Mitsubishi Lancer Evo VI	—N/a
36	(United Kingdom) Mark Higgins	(United Kingdom) Bryan Thomas	(United Kingdom) Mark Higgins	Mitsubishi Lancer Evo VI	—N/a
37	(San Marino) Mirco Baldacci	(Italy) Maurizio Barone	(San Marino) Mirco Baldacci	Mitsubishi Lancer Evo VI	—N/a
38	(United Kingdom) Natalie Barratt	(Australia) Claire Parker	(United Kingdom) Natalie Barratt Rallysport	Mitsubishi Lancer Evo VI	—N/a
44	(Cyprus) Andreas Peratikos	(Cyprus) Harris Episkopou	(Cyprus) Andreas Peratikos	Mitsubishi Lancer Evo VI	—N/a
47	(Belgium) Bob Colsoul	(Belgium) Tom Colsoul	(Belgium) Bob Colsoul	Mitsubishi Lancer Evo VI	—N/a
48	(Cyprus) Nicholas Mandrides	(Cyprus) Yiannis Ioannou	(Cyprus) Nicholas Mandrides	Mitsubishi Lancer Evo VI	—N/a
49	(Israel) Rami Shohatovich	(Cyprus) Michalakis Michael	(Israel) Rami Shohatovich	Mitsubishi Lancer Evo	—N/a
50	(Cyprus) Prodromos Prodromou	(Cyprus) Marios Vassiliades	(Cyprus) Prodromos Prodromou	Mitsubishi Lancer Evo VI	—N/a
51	(United Kingdom) Ben Briant	(United Kingdom) Tim Line	(United Kingdom) Ben Briant	Mitsubishi Lancer Evo VI	—N/a
53	(Cyprus) Charalambos Timotheou	(Cyprus) Savvas Laos	(Cyprus) Charalambos Timotheou	Subaru Impreza WRX	—N/a
54	(Belgium) François Duval	(Belgium) Jean-Marc Fortin	(Belgium) François Duval	Mitsubishi Carisma GT	—N/a
59	(United Kingdom) Alistair Ginley	(United Kingdom) John Bennie	(United Kingdom) Alistair Ginley	Mitsubishi Lancer Evo VI	—N/a
60	(Sweden) Joakim Roman	(Sweden) Ingrid Mitakidou	(Sweden) Joakim Roman	Mitsubishi Lancer Evo VI	—N/a
64	(Germany) Michael Kahlfuss	(Germany) Ronald Bauer	(Germany) Michael Kahlfuss	Toyota Celica GT-Four	—N/a
66	(Cyprus) Panagiotis Theofanides	(Cyprus) Nikos Theofanides	(Cyprus) Panagiotis Theofanides	Subaru Impreza	—N/a
67	(Cyprus) Constantinos Georgallis	(Cyprus) George Ladas	(Cyprus) Constantinos Georgallis	Subaru Impreza STI N8	—N/a
70	(Germany) Edith Weiss	(Switzerland) Cornelia Messerli	(Germany) Edith Weiss	Nissan Sunny GTI-R	—N/a
73	(Cyprus) Panayiotis Kyriakou	(Cyprus) Angelos Makrides	(Cyprus) Panayiotis Kyriakou	Hyundai Accent	—N/a
74	(Cyprus) Andreas Konstantinou	(Cyprus) Andreas Nicolaou	(Cyprus) Andreas Konstantinou	Subaru Impreza WRX	—N/a
75	(Cyprus) Andreas Agathocleous	(Cyprus) Christakis Michael	(Cyprus) Andys Motors	Mitsubishi Lancer Evo	—N/a
76	(Cyprus) Christos Antoniou	(Cyprus) Theodoros Georgiou	(Cyprus) Christos Antoniou	Mitsubishi Lancer Evo III	—N/a
77	(Israel) Nadav Dotan	(Cyprus) Andreas Antoniades	(Israel) Nadav Dotan	Subaru Impreza WRX	—N/a
79	(Cyprus) Yiangos Yiangou	(Cyprus) Leonidas Christofi	(Cyprus) Yiangos Yiangou	Suzuki Swift GTi	—N/a
83	(Cyprus) Giorgos Koudounias	(Cyprus) Yiannos Colokasides	(Cyprus) Giorgos Koudounias	Renault Clio 16V	—N/a

=== Itinerary ===
All dates and times are EEST (UTC+3).

Date	Time	No.	Stage name	Distance
Leg 1 — 137.98 km
1 June	08:48	SS1	Platres	11.48 km
1 June	09:23	SS2	Foini 1	30.29 km
1 June	11:31	SS3	Simou	35.57 km
1 June	12:39	SS4	Selladi Staktou	19.29 km
1 June	15:32	SS5	Prastio	11.06 km
1 June	16:15	SS6	Foini 2	30.29 km
Leg 2 — 105.96 km
2 June	09:18	SS7	Platres 1	11.99 km
2 June	09:56	SS8	Stavroulia 1	15.73 km
2 June	10:39	SS9	Agios Theodoros 1	9.61 km
2 June	11:07	SS10	Asinou 1	15.65 km
2 June	14:22	SS11	Platres 2	11.99 km
2 June	15:00	SS12	Stavroulia 2	15.73 km
2 June	15:43	SS13	Agios Theodoros 2	9.61 km
2 June	16:11	SS14	Asinou 2	15.65 km
Leg 3 — 97.44 km
3 June	09:38	SS15	Vavatsinia 1	19.02 km
3 June	10:26	SS16	Macheras 1	13.09 km
3 June	11:09	SS17	Lageia 1	9.53 km
3 June	11:36	SS18	Mari 1	7.07 km
3 June	14:16	SS19	Vavatsinia 2	19.02 km
3 June	15:04	SS20	Macheras 2	13.11 km
3 June	15:47	SS21	Lageia 2	9.53 km
3 June	16:14	SS22	Mari 2	7.07 km

== Results ==
=== Overall ===
Pos.	No.	Driver	Co-driver	Team	Car	Time	Difference	Points
1	4	(United Kingdom) Colin McRae	(United Kingdom) Nicky Grist	(United Kingdom) Ford Motor Co. Ltd.	Ford Focus RS WRC '01	5:07:32.7		10
2	5	(United Kingdom) Richard Burns	(United Kingdom) Robert Reid	(Japan) Subaru World Rally Team	Subaru Impreza S7 WRC '01	5:07:49.1	+16.4	6
3	4	(Spain) Carlos Sainz	(Spain) Luis Moya	(United Kingdom) Ford Motor Co. Ltd.	Ford Focus RS WRC '01	5:07:59.2	+26.5	4
4	18	(Japan) Toshihiro Arai	(Australia) Glenn Macneall	(Japan) Subaru World Rally Team	Subaru Impreza S7 WRC '01	5:13:11.0	+5:38.3	3
5	8	(Belgium) Freddy Loix	(Belgium) Sven Smeets	(Japan) Marlboro Mitsubishi Ralliart	Mitsubishi Carisma GT Evo VI	5:13:42.9	+6:10.2	2
6	26	(Finland) Pasi Hagström	(Finland) Tero Gardemeister	Toyota Castrol Finland	Toyota Corolla WRC	5:17:05.2	+9:32.5	1

=== World Rally Cars ===
==== Classification ====
Position		No.	Driver	Co-driver	Entrant	Car	Time	Difference	Points
Event	Class	No.	Driver	Co-driver	Entrant	Car	Time	Difference	Points
1	1	4	(United Kingdom) Colin McRae	(United Kingdom) Nicky Grist	(United Kingdom) Ford Motor Co. Ltd.	Ford Focus RS WRC '01	5:07:32.7		10
2	2	5	(United Kingdom) Richard Burns	(United Kingdom) Robert Reid	(Japan) Subaru World Rally Team	Subaru Impreza S7 WRC '01	5:07:49.1	+16.4	6
3	3	4	(United Kingdom) Colin McRae	(United Kingdom) Nicky Grist	(United Kingdom) Ford Motor Co. Ltd.	Ford Focus RS WRC '01	5:07:59.2	+26.5	4
5	4	8	(Belgium) Freddy Loix	(Belgium) Sven Smeets	(Japan) Marlboro Mitsubishi Ralliart	Mitsubishi Carisma GT Evo VI	5:13:42.9	+6:10.2	2
7	5	10	(United Kingdom) Alister McRae	(United Kingdom) David Senior	(South Korea) Hyundai Castrol World Rally Team	Hyundai Accent WRC2	5:18:08.3	+10:35.6	0
8	6	12	(Belgium) Bruno Thiry	(Belgium) Stéphane Prévot	(Czech Republic) Škoda Motorsport	Škoda Octavia WRC Evo2	5:19:10.7	+11:38.0	0
9	7	11	(Germany) Armin Schwarz	(Germany) Manfred Hiemer	(Czech Republic) Škoda Motorsport	Škoda Octavia WRC Evo2	5:20:20.8	+12:48.1	0
Retired SS18		1	(Finland) Marcus Grönholm	(Finland) Timo Rautiainen	(France) Peugeot Total	Peugeot 206 WRC	Fuel pressure		0
Retired SS10		2	(France) Didier Auriol	(France) Denis Giraudet	(France) Peugeot Total	Peugeot 206 WRC	Overheated engine		0
Retired SS9		9	(Sweden) Kenneth Eriksson	(Sweden) Staffan Parmander	(South Korea) Hyundai Castrol World Rally Team	Hyundai Accent WRC2	Alternator		0
Retired SS6		6	(Norway) Petter Solberg	(United Kingdom) Phil Mills	(Japan) Subaru World Rally Team	Subaru Impreza S7 WRC '01	Fire		0
Retired SS4		7	(Finland) Tommi Mäkinen	(Finland) Risto Mannisenmäki	(Japan) Marlboro Mitsubishi Ralliart	Mitsubishi Lancer Evo 6.5	Accident		0

==== Special stages ====
Day	Stage	Stage name	Length	Winner	Car	Time	Class leaders
Leg 1 (1 Jun)	SS1	Platres	11.48 km	(Norway) Petter Solberg	Subaru Impreza S7 WRC '01	9:31.4	(Norway) Petter Solberg
Leg 1 (1 Jun)	SS2	Foini 1	30.29 km	(Finland) Marcus Grönholm	Peugeot 206 WRC	27:51.0	(Finland) Marcus Grönholm
Leg 1 (1 Jun)	SS3	Simou	35.57 km	(Finland) Marcus Grönholm	Peugeot 206 WRC	31:13.0	(Finland) Marcus Grönholm
Leg 1 (1 Jun)	SS4	Selladi Staktou	19.29 km	(Norway) Petter Solberg	Subaru Impreza S7 WRC '01	16:37.6	(Finland) Marcus Grönholm
Leg 1 (1 Jun)	SS5	Prastio	11.06 km	(France) François Delecour	Ford Focus RS WRC '01	6:40.2	(Finland) Marcus Grönholm
Leg 1 (1 Jun)	SS6	Foini 2	30.29 km	(France) François Delecour	Ford Focus RS WRC '01	27:36.8	(Finland) Marcus Grönholm
Leg 2 (2 Jun)	SS7	Platres 1	11.99 km	(Spain) Carlos Sainz	Ford Focus RS WRC '01	9:45.0	(United Kingdom) Richard Burns
Leg 2 (2 Jun)	SS8	Stavroulia 1	15.73 km	(Spain) Carlos Sainz	Ford Focus RS WRC '01	16:53.3	(United Kingdom) Richard Burns
Leg 2 (2 Jun)	SS9	Agios Theodoros 1	9.61 km	(France) Didier Auriol	Peugeot 206 WRC	9:29.8	(United Kingdom) Richard Burns
Leg 2 (2 Jun)	SS10	Asinou 1	15.65 km	(Spain) Carlos Sainz	Ford Focus RS WRC '01	14:51.8	(United Kingdom) Richard Burns
Leg 2 (2 Jun)	SS11	Platres 2	11.99 km	(Spain) Carlos Sainz	Ford Focus RS WRC '01	9:47.6	(United Kingdom) Richard Burns
Leg 2 (2 Jun)	SS12	Stavroulia 2	15.73 km	(United Kingdom) Colin McRae	Ford Focus RS WRC '01	16:44.3	(United Kingdom) Colin McRae
Leg 2 (2 Jun)	SS13	Agios Theodoros 2	9.61 km	(Spain) Carlos Sainz	Ford Focus RS WRC '01	9:30.7	(United Kingdom) Colin McRae
Leg 2 (2 Jun)	SS14	Asinou 2	15.65 km	(Spain) Carlos Sainz	Ford Focus RS WRC '01	14:48.2	(United Kingdom) Richard Burns
Leg 3 (3 Jun)	SS15	Vavatsinia 1	19.02 km	(Finland) Marcus Grönholm	Peugeot 206 WRC	17:17.0	(United Kingdom) Richard Burns
Leg 3 (3 Jun)	SS16	Macheras 1	13.09 km	(United Kingdom) Colin McRae	Ford Focus RS WRC '01	11:41.2	(United Kingdom) Colin McRae
Leg 3 (3 Jun)	SS17	Lageia 1	9.53 km	(United Kingdom) Colin McRae	Ford Focus RS WRC '01	8:37.3	(United Kingdom) Colin McRae
Leg 3 (3 Jun)	SS18	Mari 1	7.07 km	(United Kingdom) Richard Burns	Subaru Impreza S7 WRC '01	4:36.1	(United Kingdom) Colin McRae
Leg 3 (3 Jun)	SS19	Vavatsinia 2	19.02 km	(United Kingdom) Colin McRae	Ford Focus RS WRC '01	16:59.8	(United Kingdom) Colin McRae
Leg 3 (3 Jun)	SS20	Macheras 2	13.11 km	(Spain) Carlos Sainz	Ford Focus RS WRC '01	11:36.0	(United Kingdom) Colin McRae
Leg 3 (3 Jun)	SS21	Lageia 2	9.53 km	(United Kingdom) Colin McRae	Ford Focus RS WRC '01	8:37.5	(United Kingdom) Colin McRae
Leg 3 (3 Jun)	SS22	Mari 2	7.07 km	(United Kingdom) Richard Burns	Subaru Impreza S7 WRC '01	4:35.5	(United Kingdom) Colin McRae

==== Championship standings ====
Pos.	Drivers' championships			Co-drivers' championships			Manufacturers' championships		
Pos.	Move	Driver	Points	Move	Co-driver	Points	Move	Manufacturer	Points
1		(Finland) Tommi Mäkinen	27		(Finland) Risto Mannisenmäki	27	1	(United Kingdom) Ford Motor Co. Ltd.	50
2		(Spain) Carlos Sainz	26		(Spain) Luis Moya	26	1	(Japan) Marlboro Mitsubishi Ralliart	47
3	1	(United Kingdom) Colin McRae	20	1	(United Kingdom) Nicky Grist	20	1	(Japan) Subaru World Rally Team	22
4	3	(United Kingdom) Richard Burns	15	3	(United Kingdom) Robert Reid	15	1	(France) Peugeot Total	20
5	2	(France) Didier Auriol	10	2	(France) Denis Giraudet	10		(South Korea) Hyundai Castrol World Rally Team	10

=== FIA Cup for Production Rally Drivers ===
==== Classification ====
Position		No.	Driver	Co-driver	Entrant	Car	Time	Difference	Points
Event	Class	No.	Driver	Co-driver	Entrant	Car	Time	Difference	Points
11	1	29	(Uruguay) Gustavo Trelles	(Argentina) Jorge Del Buono	(Uruguay) Gustavo Trelles	Mitsubishi Lancer Evo VI	5:34:44.0		10
12	2	30	(Austria) Manfred Stohl	(Austria) Peter Müller	(Austria) Manfred Stohl	Mitsubishi Lancer Evo VI	5:38:38.7	+3:54.7	6
13	3	33	(Argentina) Gabriel Pozzo	(Argentina) Daniel Stillo	(Italy) Top Run SRL	Mitsubishi Lancer Evo VI	5:43:31.7	+8:47.7	4
14	4	59	(United Kingdom) Alistair Ginley	(United Kingdom) John Bennie	(United Kingdom) Alistair Ginley	Mitsubishi Lancer Evo VI	5:52:55.1	+18:11.1	3
15	5	48	(Cyprus) Nicholas Mandrides	(Cyprus) Yiannis Ioannou	(Cyprus) Nicholas Mandrides	Mitsubishi Lancer Evo VI	5:55:43.6	+20:59.6	2
16	6	53	(Cyprus) Charalambos Timotheou	(Cyprus) Savvas Laos	(Cyprus) Charalambos Timotheou	Subaru Impreza WRX	5:56:27.0	+21:43.0	1
18	7	51	(United Kingdom) Ben Briant	(United Kingdom) Tim Line	(United Kingdom) Ben Briant	Mitsubishi Lancer Evo VI	6:04:52.0	+30:08.0	0
21	8	38	(United Kingdom) Natalie Barratt	(Australia) Claire Parker	(United Kingdom) Natalie Barratt Rallysport	Mitsubishi Lancer Evo VI	6:09:57.3	+35:13.3	0
22	9	64	(Germany) Michael Kahlfuss	(Germany) Ronald Bauer	(Germany) Michael Kahlfuss	Toyota Celica GT-Four	6:16:28.6	+41:44.6	0
24	10	76	(Cyprus) Christos Antoniou	(Cyprus) Theodoros Georgiou	(Cyprus) Christos Antoniou	Mitsubishi Lancer Evo III	6:24:12.7	+49:28.7	0
25	11	75	(Cyprus) Andreas Agathocleous	(Cyprus) Christakis Michael	(Cyprus) Andys Motors	Mitsubishi Lancer Evo	6:36:19.8	+1:01:35.8	0
28	12	79	(Cyprus) Yiangos Yiangou	(Cyprus) Leonidas Christofi	(Cyprus) Yiangos Yiangou	Suzuki Swift GTi	7:00:29.0	+1:25:45.0	0
29	13	74	(Cyprus) Andreas Konstantinou	(Cyprus) Andreas Nicolaou	(Cyprus) Andreas Konstantinou	Subaru Impreza WRX	7:04:32.8	+1:29:48.8	0
Retired SS19		70	(Germany) Edith Weiss	(Switzerland) Cornelia Messerli	(Germany) Edith Weiss	Nissan Sunny GTI-R	Retired		0
Retired SS14		73	(Cyprus) Panayiotis Kyriakou	(Cyprus) Angelos Makrides	(Cyprus) Panayiotis Kyriakou	Hyundai Accent	Retired		0
Retired SS12		77	(Israel) Nadav Dotan	(Cyprus) Andreas Antoniades	(Israel) Nadav Dotan	Subaru Impreza WRX	Retired		0
Retired SS11		49	(Israel) Rami Shohatovich	(Cyprus) Michalakis Michael	(Israel) Rami Shohatovich	Mitsubishi Lancer Evo	Mechanical		0
Retired SS7		60	(Sweden) Joakim Roman	(Sweden) Ingrid Mitakidou	(Sweden) Joakim Roman	Mitsubishi Lancer Evo VI	Retired		0
Retired SS6		66	(Cyprus) Panagiotis Theofanides	(Cyprus) Nikos Theofanides	(Cyprus) Panagiotis Theofanides	Subaru Impreza	Retired		0
Retired SS4		35	(Argentina) Marcos Ligato	(Argentina) Rubén García	(Italy) Top Run SRL	Mitsubishi Lancer Evo VI	Mechanical		0
Retired SS4		83	(Cyprus) Giorgos Koudounias	(Cyprus) Yiannos Colokasides	(Cyprus) Giorgos Koudounias	Renault Clio 16V	Mechanical		0
Retired SS3		31	(Sweden) Stig Blomqvist	(Venezuela) Ana Goñi	(United Kingdom) David Sutton Cars Ltd	Mitsubishi Lancer Evo VI	Wheel		0
Retired SS3		47	(Belgium) Bob Colsoul	(Belgium) Tom Colsoul	(Belgium) Bob Colsoul	Mitsubishi Lancer Evo VI	Mechanical		0
Retired SS2		36	(United Kingdom) Mark Higgins	(United Kingdom) Bryan Thomas	(United Kingdom) Mark Higgins	Mitsubishi Lancer Evo VI	Mechanical		0
Retired SS2		37	(San Marino) Mirco Baldacci	(Italy) Maurizio Barone	(San Marino) Mirco Baldacci	Mitsubishi Lancer Evo VI	Mechanical		0
Retired SS2		44	(Cyprus) Andreas Peratikos	(Cyprus) Harris Episkopou	(Cyprus) Andreas Peratikos	Mitsubishi Lancer Evo VI	Mechanical		0
Retired SS2		50	(Cyprus) Prodromos Prodromou	(Cyprus) Marios Vassiliades	(Cyprus) Prodromos Prodromou	Mitsubishi Lancer Evo VI	Retired		0
Retired SS2		54	(Belgium) François Duval	(Belgium) Jean-Marc Fortin	(Belgium) François Duval	Mitsubishi Carisma GT	Retired		0
Retired SS2		67	(Cyprus) Constantinos Georgallis	(Cyprus) George Ladas	(Cyprus) Constantinos Georgallis	Subaru Impreza STI N8	Mechanical		0

==== Special stages ====
Day	Stage	Stage name	Length	Winner	Car	Time	Class leaders
Leg 1 (1 Jun)	SS1	Platres	11.48 km	(Argentina) Marcos Ligato	Mitsubishi Lancer Evo VI	10:13.8	(Argentina) Marcos Ligato
Leg 1 (1 Jun)	SS2	Foini 1	30.29 km	(Austria) Manfred Stohl	Mitsubishi Lancer Evo VI	29:59.3	(Austria) Manfred Stohl
Leg 1 (1 Jun)	SS3	Simou	35.57 km	(Argentina) Marcos Ligato	Mitsubishi Lancer Evo VI	32:50.8	(Uruguay) Gustavo Trelles
Leg 1 (1 Jun)	SS4	Selladi Staktou	19.29 km	(Uruguay) Gustavo Trelles	Mitsubishi Lancer Evo VI	18:04.4	(Uruguay) Gustavo Trelles
Leg 1 (1 Jun)	SS5	Prastio	11.06 km	(Argentina) Gabriel Pozzo	Mitsubishi Lancer Evo VI	7:16.4	(Uruguay) Gustavo Trelles
Leg 1 (1 Jun)	SS6	Foini 2	30.29 km	(Austria) Manfred Stohl	Mitsubishi Lancer Evo VI	29:42.7	(Uruguay) Gustavo Trelles
Leg 2 (2 Jun)	SS7	Platres 1	11.99 km	(Austria) Manfred Stohl	Mitsubishi Lancer Evo VI	10:25.5	(Uruguay) Gustavo Trelles
Leg 2 (2 Jun)	SS8	Stavroulia 1	15.73 km	(Austria) Manfred Stohl	Mitsubishi Lancer Evo VI	17:40.2	(Uruguay) Gustavo Trelles
Leg 2 (2 Jun)	SS9	Agios Theodoros 1	9.61 km	(Argentina) Gabriel Pozzo	Mitsubishi Lancer Evo VI	10:06.7	(Uruguay) Gustavo Trelles
Leg 2 (2 Jun)	SS10	Asinou 1	15.65 km	(Austria) Manfred Stohl	Mitsubishi Lancer Evo VI	15:37.7	(Uruguay) Gustavo Trelles
Leg 2 (2 Jun)	SS11	Platres 2	11.99 km	(Austria) Manfred Stohl	Mitsubishi Lancer Evo VI	10:31.2	(Uruguay) Gustavo Trelles
Leg 2 (2 Jun)	SS12	Stavroulia 2	15.73 km	(Austria) Manfred Stohl	Mitsubishi Lancer Evo VI	17:28.1	(Uruguay) Gustavo Trelles
Leg 2 (2 Jun)	SS13	Agios Theodoros 2	9.61 km	(Austria) Manfred Stohl	Mitsubishi Lancer Evo VI	9:51.2	(Uruguay) Gustavo Trelles
Leg 2 (2 Jun)	SS14	Asinou 2	15.65 km	(Austria) Manfred Stohl	Mitsubishi Lancer Evo VI	15:38.8	(Uruguay) Gustavo Trelles
Leg 3 (3 Jun)	SS15	Vavatsinia 1	19.02 km	(Uruguay) Gustavo Trelles	Mitsubishi Lancer Evo VI	18:22.2	(Uruguay) Gustavo Trelles
Leg 3 (3 Jun)	SS16	Macheras 1	13.09 km	(Argentina) Gabriel Pozzo	Mitsubishi Lancer Evo VI	12:47.0	(Uruguay) Gustavo Trelles
Leg 3 (3 Jun)	SS17	Lageia 1	9.53 km	(Austria) Manfred Stohl	Mitsubishi Lancer Evo VI	9:04.8	(Uruguay) Gustavo Trelles
Leg 3 (3 Jun)	SS18	Mari 1	7.07 km	(Austria) Manfred Stohl	Mitsubishi Lancer Evo VI	5:24.6	(Uruguay) Gustavo Trelles
Leg 3 (3 Jun)	SS19	Vavatsinia 2	19.02 km	(Austria) Manfred Stohl	Mitsubishi Lancer Evo VI	18:15.7	(Uruguay) Gustavo Trelles
Leg 3 (3 Jun)	SS20	Macheras 2	13.11 km	(Austria) Manfred Stohl	Mitsubishi Lancer Evo VI	12:56.1	(Uruguay) Gustavo Trelles
Leg 3 (3 Jun)	SS21	Lageia 2	9.53 km	(Austria) Manfred Stohl	Mitsubishi Lancer Evo VI	8:52.8	(Uruguay) Gustavo Trelles
Leg 3 (3 Jun)	SS22	Mari 2	7.07 km	(Argentina) Gabriel Pozzo	Mitsubishi Lancer Evo VI	5:18.3	(Uruguay) Gustavo Trelles

==== Championship standings ====
Pos.	Drivers' championships		
Pos.	Move	Driver	Points
1		(Argentina) Gabriel Pozzo	27
2	3	(Uruguay) Gustavo Trelles	20
3	4	(Austria) Manfred Stohl	12
4	2	(Switzerland) Olivier Gillet	10
5	2	(Sweden) Stig-Olov Walfridsson	10
