= Bruno Thiry =

Belgian rally driver (born 1962)

Personal information
- Nationality: (Belgium) Belgian
- Born: 8 October 1962 (age 64); St. Vith, Belgium

World Rally Championship record
- Years active: 1991–2002
- Co-driver: (Belgium) Dany Delvaux (Belgium) Stéphane Prévot (Belgium) Georges Biar
- Teams: General Motors Europe, Ford, Subaru, Škoda, Bastos racing team
- Rallies: 71
- Championships: 0
- Rally wins: 0
- Podiums: 5
- Stage wins: 39
- Total points: 173
- First rally: 1989 Acropolis Rally
- Last rally: 2002 San Remo Rally

Bruno Thiry (born 8 October 1962) is a Belgian rally driver. He was born in St. Vith, Liège Province.

He began his career as an amateur in 1981, driving a Simca, and quickly became very successful in the Belgian Rally Championship. From 1991 to 1993, he joined the GME team that contested only in some selected World Rally Championship (WRC) events and in non-WRC events. In 1992, he managed his first podium finish for him on the final running of the notorious Rallye Côte d'Ivoire and finished second in an ex-works Opel Kadett GSI. The following year saw Thiry win some WRC events in an Opel Astra in the F2 category and brought GME its first manufacturer's title of the inaugural FIA 2-Litre World Cup in 1993. 1994, the year saw Thiry join the Ford team to contest the WRC, driving a Ford Escort RS Cosworth. In these years, he managed several third places; in the RAC Rally in 1994 and in Rally San Remo and the Rally Catalunya in 1996. He finished fifth overall in the WRC standings in 1994.

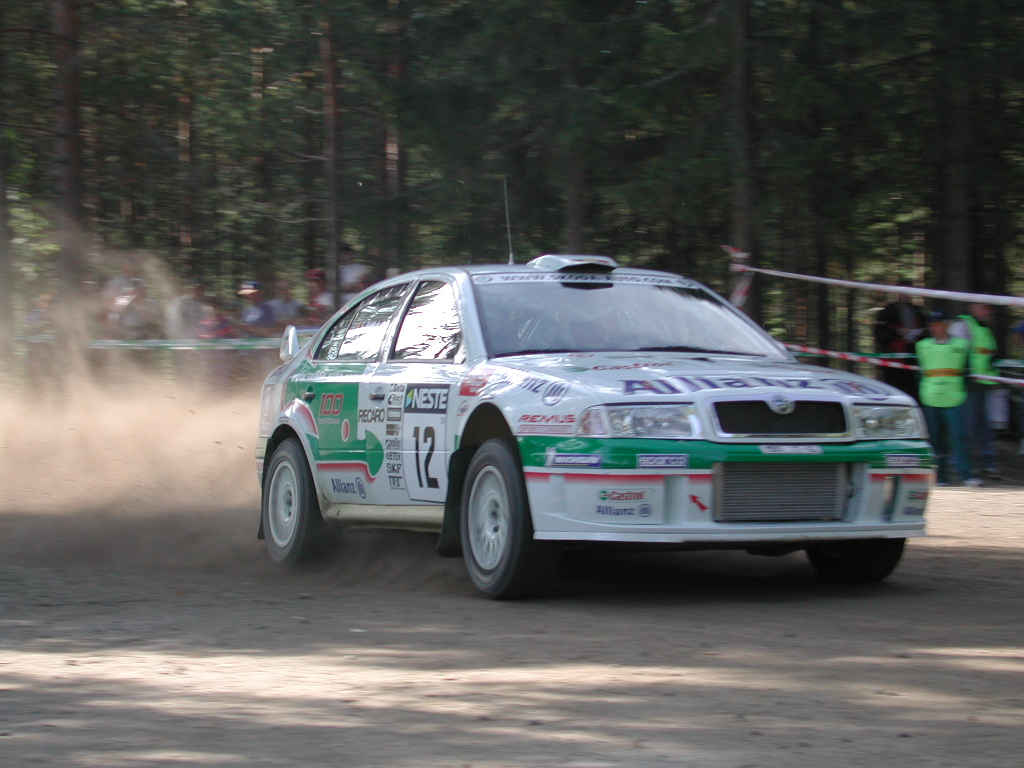
Thiry at the 2001 Rally Finland.

In 1997, he won the Rally of the Azores in a privately entered Escort Cosworth. The following year saw Thiry continue with Ford and he contested thirteen events with the exception of the Safari Rally and Rally Portugal due to an accident that caused Thiry two broken ribs and he was replaced by Ari Vatanen as the second driver for the team. Then in 1999 he campaigned a Subaru Impreza in his role as third driver for the Subaru World Rally Team.

2001 saw Thiry joined the Škoda Motorsport team and he had a disappointing year in the Octavia WRC. His highest placings that year were eighth place in the Monte Carlo Rally, the Cyprus Rally and Rally Great Britain.

In 2002 and 2003, the Peugeot 206 WRC was Thiry's vehicle of choice. He won the Ypres Rally both years, and became European Champion in 2003 after five victories. In 2004, he was runner-up in a Citroën C2 S1600.

Since 2005, Thiry has more or less retired from motorsport and only occasionally competes on events. A notable recent result was a second place on the Rally of Condroz in 2006, driving a Peugeot 307 WRC. His co-driver for most of his rallying career was fellow-Belgian Stéphane Prévot.

== WRC results ==
Year	Entrant	Car	1	2	3	4	5	6	7	8	9	10	11	12	13	14	WDC	Points
1989	Bruno Thiry	Audi 90 Quattro	SWE	MON	POR	KEN	FRA	GRC; 13	NZL	ARG	FIN	AUS	ITA	CIV	GBR		-	0
1991	Opel Team Belgium	Opel Kadett GSI 16V	MON	SWE	POR	KEN	FRA; Ret	GRE	NZL	ARG	FIN	AUS	ITA; 12	CIV	ESP		-	0
1992	Opel Team Belgium	Opel Calibra 16V	MON	SWE	POR	KEN	FRA; Ret	GRC	NZL	ARG	FIN	AUS	ITA; 9				17th	17
1992	Opel Team Belgium	Opel Kadett GSI												CIV; 2	ESP	GBR	17th	17
1993	Opel Team Belgium	Opel Astra GSi 16V	MON; 8	SWE	POR; 10	KEN	FRA; Ret	GRC; Ret	ARG	NZL	FIN; 18	AUS	ITA; 5	ESP; 7	GBR		17th	16
1994	Ford Motor Co. Ltd.	Ford Escort RS Cosworth	MON; 6	POR; Ret	KEN	FRA; 6	GRE	ARG; 4	NZL	FIN; Ret	ITA; 4	GBR; 3					5th	44
1995	R.A.S. Ford	Ford Escort RS Cosworth	MON; 5	SWE; 6	POR; 6	FRA; Ret	NZL; Ret	AUS; 6	ESP; Ret	GBR; 5							6th	34
1996	Ford Motor Co. Ltd.	Ford Escort RS Cosworth	SWE	KEN	IDN	GRE; 6	ARG; 5	FIN; 11	AUS; 6	ITA; 3	ESP; 3						6th	44
1997	Seat Sport	Seat Ibiza GTi 16V	MON	SWE	KEN	POR	ESP; Ret	FRA	ARG	GRE	NZL	FIN	IDN	ITA	AUS		-	0
1997	Gazprom Rally Team	Ford Escort WRC														GBR; Ret	-	0
1998	Ford Motor Co	Ford Escort WRC	MON; 6	SWE; 8	KEN	POR	ESP; Ret	FRA; 5	ARG; Ret	GRC; Ret	NZL; Ret	FIN; 10	ITA; 6	AUS; 7	GBR; 3		9th	8
1999	555 Subaru World Rally Team	Subaru Impreza WRC99	MON; 5	SWE; 10		POR; 6	ESP; 7	FRA; Ret	ARG	GRC	NZL	FIN	CHN	ITA	AUS		14th	6
1999	555 Subaru World Rally Team	Subaru Impreza WRC98			KEN; Ret												14th	6
1999	Škoda Motorsport	Škoda Octavia WRC														GBR; 4	14th	6
2000	H.F. Grifone SRL	Toyota Corolla WRC	MON; 5	SWE	KEN	POR	ESP	ARG	GRC	NZL	FIN	CYP	FRA	ITA	AUS	GBR	18th	2
2001	Škoda Motorsport	Škoda Octavia WRC Evo2	MON; 8	SWE; 10	POR; Ret	ESP; 10	ARG; Ret	CYP; 8	GRE; 10	KEN; Ret	FIN; 18	NZL	ITA; 13	FRA; Ret	AUS	GBR; 8	-	0
2002	Peugeot Bastos Racing	Peugeot 206 WRC	MON; 11	SWE	FRA; Ret	ESP; Ret	CYP; Ret	ARG	GRE; 12	KEN	FIN	GER; 5	ITA; 13	NZL	AUS	GBR	16th	2

Sporting positions
Preceded by Renato Travaglia	European Rally Champion; 2003	Succeeded by Simon Jean-Joseph
