= 2001 World Rally Championship =

29th season of the FIA World Rally Championship

Champions
- World Drivers' Champion: Richard Burns
- World Manufacturers' Champion: Peugeot

Seasons
- ← 2000 2002 →

The 2001 World Rally Championship was the 29th season of the FIA World Rally Championship (WRC). In a tightly contested year, Subaru's Richard Burns took his first and only drivers' world title, beating Ford's Colin McRae, Mitsubishi's Tommi Mäkinen and the defending champion Marcus Grönholm of Peugeot. Peugeot successfully defended their manufacturers' title.

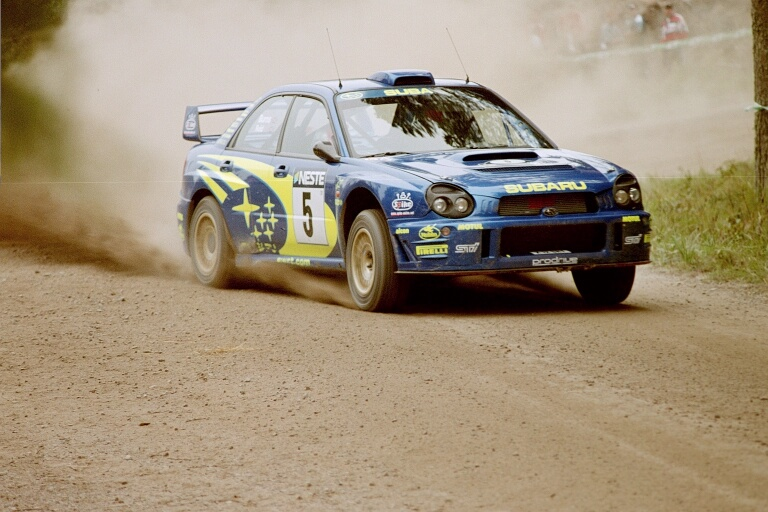
Eventual champion Richard Burns driving a Subaru Impreza WRC at the 2001 Rally Finland.

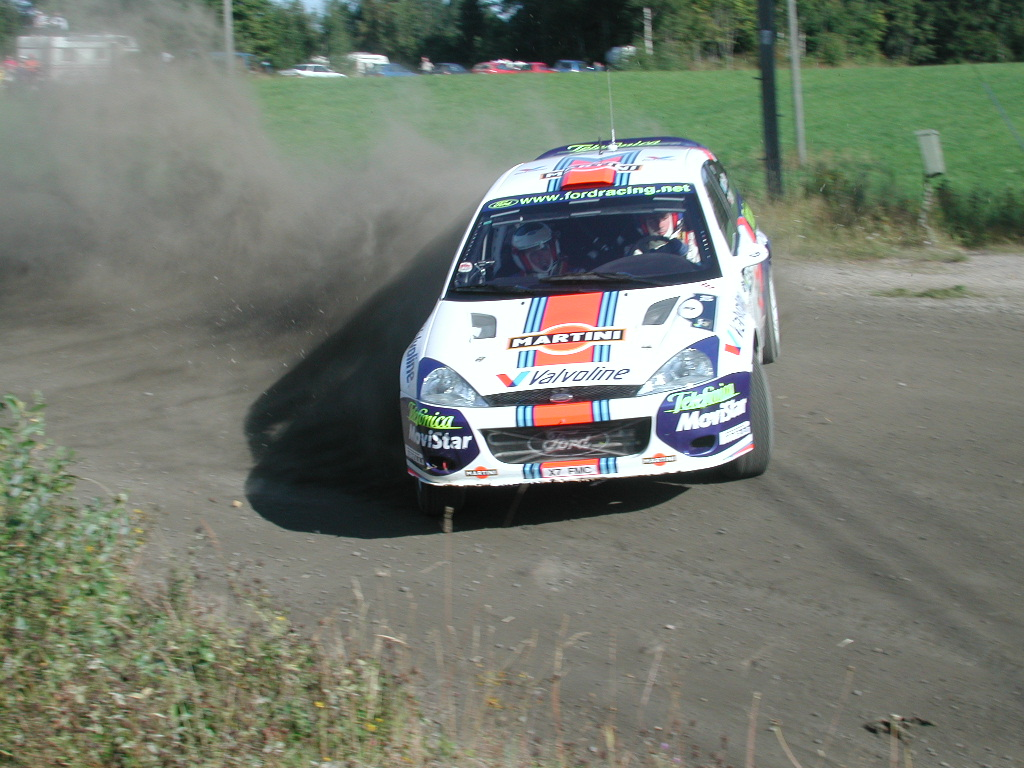
Colin McRae finished runner-up in a Ford Focus RS WRC 01.

== Calendar ==
The 2001 championship was contested over fourteen rounds in Europe, Africa, South America and Oceania.

Rd.	Start date	Finish date	Rally	Rally headquarters	Surface	Stages	Distance	Support class
1	18 January	21 January	(Monaco) 69th Rallye Automobile Monte Carlo	Monte Carlo	Mixed	15	373.06 km	N/A
2	8 February	11 February	(Sweden) 50th International Swedish Rally	Karlstad, Värmland County	Snow	17	380.31 km	Teams Cup
3	8 March	11 March	35th TAP Rallye de Portugal	Santa Maria da Feira, Aveiro District	Gravel	22	390.72 km	Teams Cup
4	22 March	25 March	(Spain) 37th Rallye Catalunya - Costa Brava - Rallye de España	Lloret de Mar, Catalonia	Tarmac	18	383.18 km	Super 1600
5	3 May	6 May	21st Rally Argentina	Carlos Paz, Córdoba	Gravel	21	389.58 km	N/A
6	31 May	3 June	29th Cyprus Rally	Limassol, Limassol District	Gravel	22	341.38 km	Teams Cup
7	14 June	17 June	(Greece) 48th Acropolis Rally	Itea, Phocis	Gravel	20	387.41 km	Super 1600/Teams Cup
8	19 July	22 July	49th Safari Rally Kenya	Nairobi	Gravel	13	1129.76 km	N/A
9	23 August	26 August	51st Neste Rally Finland	Jyväskylä, Central Finland	Gravel	21	406.38 km	Super 1600
10	20 September	23 September	32nd Propecia Rally New Zealand	Manukau, Auckland	Gravel	24	382.46 km	N/A
11	4 October	7 October	(Italy) 43rd Rallye Sanremo - Rallye d'Italia	Sanremo, Liguria	Tarmac	20	368.12 km	Super 1600/Teams Cup
12	18 October	21 October	45th Tour de Corse - Rallye de France	Ajaccio, Corsica	Tarmac	16	394.04 km	Super 1600
13	1 November	4 November	14th Telstra Rally Australia	Perth, Western Australia	Gravel	21	396.77 km	Teams Cup
14	22 November	25 November	(United Kingdom) 57th Network Q Rally of Great Britain	Cardiff, Wales	Gravel	17	380.86 km	Super 1600

=== Calendar changes ===
All 14 rounds from the previous season remained on the calendar for the 2001 season. April was left open with the belief at the time being that Britain would be moved to the spring in 2002, since there had been talks to relocate Rally GB to earlier in the year to make the event better for weather and tourism. The Safari rally was moved to the summer away from its traditional spring date, while Cyprus was also moved to the summer to be back to back with the Acropolis Rally.

There had been plans to relocate Rally Australia from Perth to Melbourne with the event being based on the Rally of Melbourne that was part of the Australian Rally Championship at the time. However these plans failed to materialize and the Rally remained in Perth.

During the season, Rally GB was under the threat of cancellation due to the outbreak of foot-and-mouth disease in the United Kingdom, leading to the Rally of Lebanon being prepared as a replacement. Rally GB was able to go ahead but with a more compact route which concentrated on more rural parts of the south of Wales and controversially removed popular stages such as Sweet Lamb and Myherin.

== Teams and drivers ==
World Rally Car entries eligible to score manufacturer points
Manufacturer	Car	Team	Tyre	No	Drivers	Co-Drivers	Rounds
Peugeot	206 WRC	(France) Peugeot Total	M	1	(Finland) Marcus Grönholm	(Finland) Timo Rautiainen	All
Peugeot	206 WRC	(France) Peugeot Total	M	2	(France) Didier Auriol	(France) Denis Giraudet	All
Peugeot	206 WRC	(France) Peugeot Total	M	16	(Finland) Harri Rovanperä	(Finland) Risto Pietiläinen	2–3, 5–10, 13–14
Peugeot	206 WRC	(France) Peugeot Total	M	16	(France) Gilles Panizzi	(France) Hervé Panizzi	1, 4, 11–12
Peugeot	206 WRC	(France) Peugeot Total	M	19	(France) Gilles Panizzi	(France) Hervé Panizzi	13
Ford	Focus RS WRC 01	(United States) Ford Motor Co Ltd	P	3	(Spain) Carlos Sainz	(Spain) Luis Moya	All
Ford	Focus RS WRC 01	(United States) Ford Motor Co Ltd	P	4	(Scotland) Colin McRae	(Wales) Nicky Grist	All
Ford	Focus RS WRC 01	(United States) Ford Motor Co Ltd	P	17	(France) François Delecour	(France) Daniel Grataloup	1-13
Subaru	Impreza WRC2001	(Japan) 555 Subaru World Rally Team	P	5	(United Kingdom) Richard Burns	(United Kingdom) Robert Reid	All
Subaru	Impreza WRC2001	(Japan) 555 Subaru World Rally Team	P	6	(Norway) Petter Solberg	(Wales) Phil Mills	2–14
Subaru	Impreza WRC2001	(Japan) 555 Subaru World Rally Team	P	6	(Estonia) Markko Märtin	(United Kingdom) Michael Park	1
Subaru	Impreza WRC2001	(Japan) 555 Subaru World Rally Team	P	18	(Estonia) Markko Märtin	(United Kingdom) Michael Park	4, 7, 9, 11–12, 14
Subaru	Impreza WRC2001	(Japan) 555 Subaru World Rally Team	P	18	(Norway) Petter Solberg	(United Kingdom) Phil Mills	1
Subaru	Impreza WRC2001	(Japan) 555 Subaru World Rally Team	P	18	(Japan) Toshihiro Arai	(Australia) Glenn MacNeall	5–6, 10, 13
Subaru	Impreza WRC2001	(Japan) 555 Subaru World Rally Team	P	19	(Japan) Toshihiro Arai	(Australia) Glenn MacNeall	3, 8, 10-11
Subaru	Impreza WRC2001	(Japan) 555 Subaru World Rally Team	P	20	(Japan) Toshihiro Arai	(Australia) Glenn MacNeall	7
Subaru	Impreza WRC2001	(Japan) 555 Subaru World Rally Team	P	21	(Japan) Toshihiro Arai	(New Zealand) Tony Sircombe	14
Mitsubishi	Lancer Evo 6.5/Carisma GT Evo VI 1-10; Lancer Evo WRC 11-14	(Japan) Marlboro Mitsubishi Ralliart	M	7	(Finland) Tommi Mäkinen	(Finland) Risto Mannisenmäki	1-12
Mitsubishi	Lancer Evo 6.5/Carisma GT Evo VI 1-10; Lancer Evo WRC 11-14	(Japan) Marlboro Mitsubishi Ralliart	M	7	(Finland) Tommi Mäkinen	(Finland) Timo Hantunen	13
Mitsubishi	Lancer Evo 6.5/Carisma GT Evo VI 1-10; Lancer Evo WRC 11-14	(Japan) Marlboro Mitsubishi Ralliart	M	7	(Finland) Tommi Mäkinen	(Finland) Kaj Lindström	14
Mitsubishi	Lancer Evo 6.5/Carisma GT Evo VI 1-10; Lancer Evo WRC 11-14	(Japan) Marlboro Mitsubishi Ralliart	M	8	(Belgium) Freddy Loix	(Belgium) Sven Smeets	All
Hyundai	Accent WRC 1-2; Accent WRC2 3-14	(South Korea) Hyundai World Rally Team	M	9	(Italy) Piero Liatti	(Italy) Carlo Cassina	1, 4, 11–12
Hyundai	Accent WRC 1-2; Accent WRC2 3-14	(South Korea) Hyundai World Rally Team	M	9	(Sweden) Kenneth Eriksson	(Sweden) Staffan Parmander	2–3, 5–7, 9–10, 13–14
Hyundai	Accent WRC 1-2; Accent WRC2 3-14	(South Korea) Hyundai World Rally Team	M	10	(United Kingdom) Alister McRae	(United Kingdom) David Senior	1–7, 9–14
Hyundai	Accent WRC 1-2; Accent WRC2 3-14	(South Korea) Hyundai World Rally Team	M	19	(Italy) Piero Liatti	(Italy) Carlo Cassina	6, 14
Hyundai	Accent WRC 1-2; Accent WRC2 3-14	(South Korea) Hyundai World Rally Team	M	20	(Finland) Juha Kankkunen	(Finland) Juha Repo	9
Škoda	Octavia WRC Evo2	(Czech Republic) Škoda Motorsport	M	11	(Germany) Armin Schwarz	(Germany) Manfred Hiemer	1–9, 11–12, 14
Škoda	Octavia WRC Evo2	(Czech Republic) Škoda Motorsport	M	12	(Belgium) Bruno Thiry	(Belgium) Stéphane Prévot	1–8, 11–12, 14
Škoda	Octavia WRC Evo2	(Czech Republic) Škoda Motorsport	M	12	(Belgium) Bruno Thiry	(Belgium) Georges Biar	9
Škoda	Octavia WRC Evo2	(Czech Republic) Škoda Motorsport	M	20	(Czech Republic) Roman Kresta	(Czech Republic) Jan Tománek	8, 11, 14

World Rally Car entries ineligible to score manufacturer points
Manufacturer	Car	Team	Tyre	Drivers	Co-Drivers	Rounds
Ford	Focus RS WRC 01	(United Kingdom) Ford Motor Co Ltd	P	(United Kingdom) Mark Higgins	(United Kingdom) Bryan Thomas	14
Ford	Focus RS WRC 01	(United Kingdom) Ford Motor Co Ltd	P	(Italy) Paolo Andreucci	(Italy) Alessandro Giusti	11
Citroën	Xsara WRC	(France) Citroën Sport	M	(France) Philippe Bugalski	(France) Jean-Paul Chiaroni	4, 7, 11–12
Citroën	Xsara WRC	(France) Citroën Sport	M	(Spain) Jesús Puras	(Spain) Marc Martí	4, 11–12
Citroën	Xsara WRC	(France) Citroën Sport	M	(Sweden) Thomas Rådström	(Sweden) Tina Thörner	7
Citroën	Xsara WRC	(France) Citroën Sport	M	(France) Sébastien Loeb	(Monaco) Daniel Elena	11
Subaru	Impreza WRC2001	(Japan) 555 Subaru World Rally Team	P	(United Kingdom) Neil Wearden	(United Kingdom) Trevor Agnew	14
Hyundai	Accent WRC2	(South Korea) Hyundai World Rally Team		(Norway) Thomas Kolberg	(Norway) Werner Seigerud	2
Hyundai	Accent WRC2	(South Korea) Hyundai World Rally Team		(Norway) Kristian Kolberg	(Sweden) Anders Dawidson	2
Škoda	Octavia WRC Evo2	(Czech Republic) Škoda Motorsport	M	(Sweden) Stig Blomqvist	(Venezuela) Ana Goñi	9
Peugeot	206 WRC	(Italy) H.F. Grifone SRL	M	(Finland) Toni Gardemeister	(Finland) Paavo Lukander	1-2
Peugeot	206 WRC	(Italy) H.F. Grifone SRL	M	(Finland) Harri Rovanperä	(Finland) Risto Pietiläinen	11-12
Peugeot	206 WRC	(Italy) H.F. Grifone SRL	M	(France) Gilles Panizzi	(France) Hervé Panizzi	3, 6–7, 9, 14
Peugeot	206 WRC	(Italy) H.F. Grifone SRL	M	(United Kingdom) Neil Wearden	(United Kingdom) Trevor Agnew	6, 9–10, 12
Peugeot	206 WRC	(Italy) H.F. Grifone SRL		(Monaco) Jean-Pierre Richelmi	(France) Thierry Barjou	7
Peugeot	206 WRC	(Portugal) Peugeot Esso Silver Team SG		(Portugal) Adruzilo Lopes	(Portugal) Luís Lisboa	3-4
Peugeot	206 WRC	(Belgium) Peugeot Bastos Racing	M	(Belgium) Kris Princen	(Belgium) Dany Colebunders	3–4, 6
Peugeot	206 WRC	(Belgium) Peugeot Bastos Racing	M	(France) Simon Jean-Joseph	(France) Jacques Boyere	4, 6–7, 11
Peugeot	206 WRC	(Belgium) Peugeot Bastos Racing	M	(Belgium) Grégoire de Mévius	(France) Jacques Boyere	14
Peugeot	206 WRC	Peugeot Sport Finland	M	(Finland) Sebastian Lindholm	(Finland) Timo Hantunen	9
Peugeot	206 WRC	Peugeot Sport Austria	M	(Austria) Raphael Sperrer	(Sweden) Per Carlsson	9
Peugeot	206 WRC	(Italy) F.P.F. Sport		(Italy) Renato Travaglia	(Italy) Flavio Zanella	11
Peugeot	206 WRC	(Greece) Papadimitriou Team	M	(Greece) Ioannis Papadimitriou	(Republic of Ireland) Chris Patterson	2-3, 6-7
Peugeot	206 WRC	(France) Simon Jean-Joseph	M	(France) Simon Jean-Joseph	(France) Jack Boyére	4, 6-7, 11
Toyota	Corolla WRC	(Italy) H.F. Grifone SRL	M	(Italy) Piero Longhi	(Italy) Lucio Baggio	1, 11
Toyota	Corolla WRC	(Italy) H.F. Grifone SRL	M	(Italy) Pier Lorenzo Zanchi	(Italy) Dario D'Esposito	1
Toyota	Corolla WRC	(Italy) H.F. Grifone SRL	M	(Finland) Tapio Laukkanen	(Finland) Kaj Lindström	2-3
Toyota	Corolla WRC	(Italy) H.F. Grifone SRL		(Finland) Juuso Pykälistö	(Finland) Esko Mertsalmi	9
Toyota	Corolla WRC	(Japan) Toyota Castrol Team	P	(Switzerland) Olivier Burri	(Switzerland) Jean-Philippe Patthey	1
Toyota	Corolla WRC	(Japan) Toyota Castrol Team		(Sweden) Daniel Carlsson	(Sweden) Benny Melander	2–3, 9, 11
Toyota	Corolla WRC	(Japan) Toyota Castrol Team		(Portugal) Pedro Chaves	(Portugal) Sérgio Paiva	3
Toyota	Corolla WRC	(Japan) Toyota Castrol Team		(Germany) Antony Warmbold	(United Kingdom) Gemma Price	3, 9
Toyota	Corolla WRC	(Japan) Toyota Castrol Team		(Finland) Jouni Ahvenlammi	(Finland) Teppo Leino	9
Toyota	Corolla WRC	(Japan) Toyota Castrol Team		(Australia) Neal Bates	(Australia) Coral Taylor	13
Toyota	Corolla WRC	Shell Norway Motorsport	M	(Norway) Henning Solberg	(Norway) Ola Fløene	2–3
Toyota	Corolla WRC	Shell Norway Motorsport		(Norway) Henning Solberg	(Norway) Cato Menkerud	9
Toyota	Corolla WRC	(Finland) LPM Racing		(Finland) Janne Tuohino	(Finland) Petri Vihavainen	2, 4, 9, 13
Toyota	Corolla WRC	(Finland) LPM Racing		(Finland) Juha Kangas	(Finland) Mika Ovaskainen	9
Toyota	Corolla WRC	(Poland) Mocne Rally		(Poland) Leszek Kuzaj	(Poland) Maciek Baran	3
Toyota	Corolla WRC	(Spain) Escudería Bengala	M	(Spain) Luís Climent	(Spain) Álex Romaní	4
Toyota	Corolla WRC	(Italy) Top Run SRL		(Italy) Domenico Caldarola	(Italy) Paolo Cecchini	11
Toyota	Corolla WRC	Toyota Castrol Team Denmark	M	(Denmark) Henrik Lundgaard	(Denmark) Jens-Christian Anker	2-3, 6-7, 11, 13
Toyota	Corolla WRC	Toyota Castrol Team Finland	M	(Finland) Pasi Hagström	(Finland) Tero Gardemeister	2–3, 6–7, 11, 13
Toyota	Corolla WRC	Toyota Team Saudi Arabia	M	(Saudi Arabia) Abdullah Bakhashab	(United Kingdom) Bobby Willis	2-3, 6-7, 11, 13
Toyota	Corolla WRC	(Italy) Giovanni Recordati		(Italy) Giovanni Recordati	(Monaco) Freddy Delorme	6-7
Subaru	Impreza WRC99	(Italy) Procar Rally Team		(Italy) Tobia Cavallini	(Italy) Bernardo Serra	1
Subaru	Impreza WRC2000	(Italy) Procar Rally Team		(Greece) Armodios Vovos	(Greece) Loris Meletopoulos	7
Subaru	Impreza WRC2000	(Italy) Procar Rally Team		(Italy) Diego Oldrati	(Italy) Danilo Fappani	11
Subaru	Impreza WRC2000	(Greece) Papadimitriou Team		(Greece) Ioannis Papadimitriou	(Republic of Ireland) Chris Patterson	11
Subaru	Impreza WRC98	(Netherlands) Subaru Benelux	P	(Netherlands) Mark Breijer	(Netherlands) Hans van Goor	4, 11, 14
Subaru	Impreza WRC98	(France) Jean-Claude Torre	M	(France) Jean-Claude Torre	(France) Patrick de la Foata	12
Subaru	Impreza WRC2000	(Austria) Promotor World Rally Team	P	(Austria) Achim Mörtl	(Austria) Stefan Eichhorner	4, 9
Subaru	Impreza WRC2001	(Austria) Promotor World Rally Team	P	(Austria) Achim Mörtl	(Austria) Stefan Eichhorner	11-13
Subaru	Impreza WRC2000	Subaru Rally Team Australia	P	(New Zealand) Peter 'Possum' Bourne	(New Zealand) Craig Vincent	10
Subaru	Impreza WRC2000	Subaru Rally Team Australia	P	(New Zealand) Peter 'Possum' Bourne	(Australia) Mark Stacey	13
Subaru	Impreza WRC98	Shell Norway Motorsport	M	(Norway) Henning Solberg	(Norway) Cato Menkerud	14
Subaru	Impreza WRC98	(Monaco) Richard Hein		(Monaco) Richard Hein	(France) Philippe Sevol	1, 12
Subaru	Impreza WRC99	(Italy) Tobia Cavallini		(Italy) Tobia Cavallini	(Italy) Bernardo Serra	1
Subaru	Impreza WRC99	(United Kingdom) Derek McGarrity		(United Kingdom) Derek McGarrity	(Republic of Ireland) Dermot O'Gorman	14
Subaru	Impreza WRC98	(Slovakia) Styllex Tuning Prosport	M	(Czech Republic) Tomáš Hrdinka	(Czech Republic) Petr Gross	2
Ford	Focus WRC 00	(Finland) Blue Rose Team	P	(Finland) Jani Paasonen	(Finland) Arto Kapanen	2, 9
Ford	Focus WRC 00	(Finland) Blue Rose Team	P	(Finland) Markku Alén	(Finland) Ilkka Riipinen	9
Ford	Focus WRC 99	(Italy) Jolly Club		(Czech Republic) Roman Kresta	(Czech Republic) Jan Tománek	7
Ford	Focus WRC 99	(Finland) Jari Viita		(Finland) Jari Viita	(Finland) Riku Rousku	9
Ford	Focus WRC 00	(Spain) Carlos Sainz Junior Team		(Spain) Txus Jaio	(Spain) Lucas Cruz	14
SEAT	Córdoba WRC Evo3	(Spain) SEAT Sport		(Spain) Marc Blázquez	(Spain) Jordi Mercader	3–6
SEAT	Córdoba WRC Evo3	(Spain) SEAT Sport	P	(Spain) Salvador Cañellas	(Spain) Alberto Sanchís	4
SEAT	Córdoba WRC Evo3	(Spain) SEAT Sport	P	(United Kingdom) Gwyndaf Evans	(United Kingdom) Chris Patterson	14
SEAT	Córdoba WRC Evo2	(Spain) SEAT Sport	M	(Germany) Matthias Kahle	(Germany) Peter Göbel	7
Subaru	Impreza WRC2000	Oman Arab World Rally Team	M	(Oman) Hamed Al-Wahaibi	(New Zealand) Tony Sircombe	2–3, 6–7, 11
Subaru	Impreza WRC2001	Oman Arab World Rally Team		(Oman) Hamed Al-Wahaibi	(New Zealand) Tony Sircombe	13
Subaru	Impreza WRC99	(United Kingdom) World Rally HIRE		(United Kingdom) Nigel Heath	(United Kingdom) Steve Lancaster	2–3, 6–7, 11, 13
Subaru	Impreza WRC2000	(France) F.Dor Rally Team	M	(France) Frédéric Dor	(France) Didier Breton	2–3, 6
Subaru	Impreza WRC2001	(France) F.Dor Rally Team		(France) Frédéric Dor	(France) Didier Breton	8
Subaru	Impreza WRC98	(Czech Republic) Styllex Tuning Prosport	M	(Czech Republic) Tomáš Hrdinka	(Czech Republic) Petr Gross	2
Ford	Focus WRC 00	(Poland) Marlboro Ford Mobil 1 Team	M	(Poland) Janusz Kulig	(Poland) Jarosław Baran	2-3
Ford	Focus RS WRC 01	(Portugal) Ford Galp Racing	P	(Portugal) Rui Madeira	(Portugal) Fernando Prata	3
Hyundai	Accent WRC	(United Kingdom) Steve Petch	P	(United Kingdom) Steve Petch	(United Kingdom) John Richardson	14
Hyundai	Accent WRC	(United Kingdom) Peter Littler	M	(United Kingdom) Peter Littler	(United Kingdom) Andrew Marchbank	14

=== Super 1600 Championship entries ===
Team	Manufacturer	Car	No	Drivers	Co-drivers	Rounds
(Italy) Top Run SRL	Fiat	Punto S1600	50	(Austria) Manfred Stohl	(Austria) Ilka Minor	4, 7, 11–12, 14
(Italy) Top Run SRL	Fiat	Punto S1600	50	(Austria) Manfred Stohl	(Austria) Peter Müller	9
(Italy) Top Run SRL	Fiat	Punto S1600	56	(Italy) Giandomenico Basso	(Italy) Flavio Guglielmini	4, 7, 9, 11–12, 14
(United Kingdom) Ford Motor Co Ltd	Ford	Puma S1600	51	(France) Patrick Magaud	(France) Guylène Brun	4, 7, 9, 11–12, 14
(United Kingdom) Ford Motor Co Ltd	Ford	Puma S1600	55	(United Kingdom) Niall McShea	(United Kingdom) Michael Orr	4, 7
(United Kingdom) Ford Motor Co Ltd	Ford	Puma S1600	59	(France) Benoît Rousselot	(France) Gilles Mondésir	4, 7, 9, 11–12, 14
(United Kingdom) Ford Motor Co Ltd	Ford	Puma S1600	71	(Belgium) François Duval	(Belgium) Jean-Marc Fortin	4, 7, 9, 11–12, 14
(Italy) R&D Motorsport	Fiat	Punto S1600	52	(Italy) Andrea Dallavilla	(Italy) Danilo Fappani	4
(Italy) R&D Motorsport	Fiat	Punto S1600	52	(Italy) Andrea Dallavilla	(Italy) Massimo Chiapponi	7
(Italy) R&D Motorsport	Fiat	Punto S1600	52	(Italy) Andrea Dallavilla	(Italy) Giovanni Bernacchini	9, 11–12, 14
(Italy) R&D Motorsport	Fiat	Punto S1600	64	(Italy) Massimo Macaluso	(Italy) Antonio Celot	4, 7, 9, 11–12, 14
(France) Citroën Sport	Citroën	Saxo S1600	53	(France) Sébastien Loeb	(Monaco) Daniel Elena	4, 7, 9, 12, 14
(France) Citroën Sport	Citroën	Saxo S1600	55	(United Kingdom) Niall McShea	(United Kingdom) Michael Orr	9, 11–12, 14
(Belgium) Peugeot Bastos Racing	Peugeot	206 S1600	54	(Belgium) Larry Cols	(Belgium) Yasmine Gerard	4, 7, 9, 11–12
(Belgium) Peugeot Bastos Racing	Peugeot	206 S1600	54	(Belgium) Larry Cols	(Belgium) Dany Colebunders	14
(France) Team Gamma	Peugeot	206 S1600	57	(France) Cédric Robert	(France) Marie-Pierre Billoux	4, 7, 9, 11–12
(France) Team Gamma	Peugeot	206 S1600	57	(France) Cédric Robert	(France) Gérald Bedon	14
(France) Team Gamma	Peugeot	206 S1600	69	(France) Nicolas Bernardi	(France) Delphine Cavalier	4, 7, 11–12
(France) Team Gamma	Peugeot	206 S1600	69	(France) Nicolas Bernardi	(France) Jean-Claude Grau	9
(France) Team Gamma	Peugeot	206 S1600	69	(France) Nicolas Bernardi	(France) Bruno Brissart	14
(Spain) Pronto Racing	Fiat	Punto S1600	58	(Spain) Sergio Vallejo	(Spain) Diego Vallejo	4, 7, 9, 11–12, 14
(Spain) Pronto Racing	Fiat	Punto S1600	67	(Andorra) Albert Llovera	(Spain) Marc Corral	4, 7, 9, 11–12, 14
(Switzerland) Rally Team Henny	Citroën	Saxo S1600	60	(Switzerland) Cyril Henny	(Switzerland) Aurore Brand	4, 7
(Italy) H.F. Grifone SRL	Peugeot	206 S1600	61	(Italy) Corrado Fontana	(Italy) Renzo Casazza	4, 7, 9, 11–12, 14
(Finland) ST Motors	Peugeot	206 S1600	62	(Finland) Jussi Välimäki	(Finland) Jakke Honkanen	4, 7, 9, 11–12, 14
(Norway) Zeta Racing	Ford	Puma S1600	63	(Norway) Martin Stenshorne	(United Kingdom) Clive Jenkins	4, 7, 9, 11–12, 14
(Italy) Astra Racing	Ford	Puma S1600	65	(Paraguay) Alejandro Galanti	(Uruguay) Daniel Muzio	4
(Italy) Astra Racing	Ford	Puma S1600	65	(Paraguay) Alejandro Galanti	(Paraguay) Fernando Zuleta	7, 9
(Italy) Astra Racing	Ford	Puma S1600	65	(Paraguay) Alejandro Galanti	(Spain) Xavier Amigó	11–12, 14
(Italy) Hawk Racing Club	Fiat	Punto S1600	68	(Italy) Massimo Ceccato	(Italy) Mitia Dotta	4, 7, 9, 11–12, 14
(Italy) Hawk Racing Club	Fiat	Punto S1600	73	(Italy) Christian Chemin	(Italy) Matteo Alberto Bacchin	4, 7, 9, 11–12
(Italy) Hawk Racing Club	Fiat	Punto S1600	73	(Italy) Christian Chemin	(Italy) Simone Scattolin	14
(Malaysia) Saladin Rallying	Fiat	Punto S1600	72	(Malaysia) Saladin Mazlan	(United Kingdom) Timothy Sturla	4
(Malaysia) Saladin Rallying	Ford	Puma S1600	72	(Malaysia) Saladin Mazlan	(United Kingdom) Timothy Sturla	7, 9, 11–12
(Malaysia) Saladin Rallying	Citroën	Saxo S1600	72	(Malaysia) Saladin Mazlan	(United Kingdom) Timothy Sturla	14

=== Group N Cup major entries ===
Team	Manufacturer	Car	Tyre	Drivers	Co-drivers	Rounds
(Austria) Stohl Racing	Mitsubishi	Lancer Evo VI	P	(Austria) Manfred Stohl	(Austria) Peter Müller	1, 3, 6, 10, 13
(Austria) Stohl Racing	Mitsubishi	Lancer Evo VI	P	(Austria) Rudolf Stohl	(Austria) Peter Müller	8
(Uruguay) Gustavo Trelles	Mitsubishi	Lancer Evo VI	P	(Uruguay) Gustavo Trelles	(Argentina) Jorge Del Buono	1, 3–7, 11–12
(Italy) Vieffe Corse SRL	Mitsubishi	Lancer Evo VI	P	(Italy) Gianluigi Galli	(Italy) Giovanni Bernacchini	1, 9
(Italy) Top Run	Mitsubishi	Lancer Evo VI	P	(Argentina) Gabriel Pozzo	(Argentina) Edgardo Galindo	1
(Italy) Top Run	Mitsubishi	Lancer Evo VI	P	(Argentina) Gabriel Pozzo	(Argentina) Daniel Stillo	3–11, 13
(Italy) Top Run	Mitsubishi	Lancer Evo VI	P	(Argentina) Marcos Ligato	(Argentina) Rubén García	1, 3–11, 13
(Switzerland) Olivier Gillet	Mitsubishi	Lancer Evo VI	M	(Switzerland) Olivier Gillet	(Monaco) Freddy Delorme	1
(France) David Truphemus	Mitsubishi	Lancer Evo VI		(France) David Truphemus	(France) Pascal Saivre	1
(Belgium) Guy Colsoul Rallysport	Mitsubishi	Lancer Evo V	M	(Belgium) Bob Colsoul	(Belgium) Tom Colsoul	1–2
(Belgium) Guy Colsoul Rallysport	Mitsubishi	Lancer Evo VI	M	(Belgium) Bob Colsoul	(Belgium) Tom Colsoul	3–4, 6–7, 9, 12–14
Mitsubishi Ralliart Sweden	Mitsubishi	Lancer Evo VI	M	(Sweden) Kenneth Bäcklund	(Sweden) Tord Andersson	2, 9, 14
Mitsubishi Ralliart Sweden	Mitsubishi	Lancer Evo VI	M	(Sweden) Stig-Olov Walfridsson	(Sweden) Lars Bäckman	2
(Sweden) Mats Jonsson	Mitsubishi	Lancer Evo VI		(Sweden) Mats Jonsson	(Sweden) Johnny Johansson	2
(United Kingdom) David Sutton Cars Ltd	Mitsubishi	Lancer Evo VI	M	(Sweden) Stig Blomqvist	(Venezuela) Ana Goñi	2–8, 10–11, 13–14
(United Kingdom) David Sutton Cars Ltd	Mitsubishi	Lancer Evo V	M	(United Kingdom) Oliver Clark	(United Kingdom) Richard Pashley	14
(United Kingdom) David Sutton Cars Ltd	Mitsubishi	Lancer Evo V	M	(United Kingdom) Natalie Barratt	(United Kingdom) Trevor Agnew	2
(United Kingdom) Barratt Rallysport	Mitsubishi	Lancer Evo V	M	(United Kingdom) Natalie Barratt	(Australia) Claire Parker	3–4
(United Kingdom) Barratt Rallysport	Mitsubishi	Lancer Evo VI	M	(United Kingdom) Natalie Barratt	(Australia) Claire Parker	6–7
(United Kingdom) Barratt Rallysport	Mitsubishi	Lancer Evo VI	M	(United Kingdom) Natalie Barratt	(United Kingdom) Stella Boyles	9
(United Kingdom) Barratt Rallysport	Mitsubishi	Lancer Evo VI	M	(United Kingdom) Natalie Barratt	(United Kingdom) Michael Gibson	11
(United Kingdom) Barratt Rallysport	Mitsubishi	Lancer Evo VI	M	(United Kingdom) Natalie Barratt	(United Kingdom) Chris Patterson	10, 13
(United Kingdom) Barratt Rallysport	Mitsubishi	Lancer Evo VI	M	(United Kingdom) Natalie Barratt	(United Kingdom) Roger Freeman	14
(Lithuania) Saulius Girdauskas	Mitsubishi	Lancer Evo VI	M	(Lithuania) Saulius Girdauskas	(Lithuania) Žilvinas Sakalauskas	2, 9
(Sweden) Joakim Roman	Mitsubishi	Lancer Evo V		(Sweden) Joakim Roman	(Sweden) Ingrid Mitakidou	2, 6
Scuderia San Marino	Mitsubishi	Lancer Evo VI	P	(San Marino) Mirco Baldacci	(Italy) Maurizio Barone	3, 6–7, 9, 14
(Portugal) Pedro Dias da Silva	Mitsubishi	Lancer Evo 6.5	M	(Portugal) Pedro Dias da Silva	(Portugal) Mário Castro	3
(Portugal) Vítor Pascoal	Mitsubishi	Lancer Evo VI		(Portugal) Vítor Pascoal	(Portugal) Duarte Costa	3
(Portugal) Creditus/BPN Rent	Mitsubishi	Lancer Evo VI		(Portugal) Pedro Leal	(Portugal) Redwan Cassamo	3
(Portugal) Rodrigo Ferreira	Mitsubishi	Lancer Evo VI		(Portugal) Rodrigo Ferreira	(Portugal) Luís Silva	3
(Poland) Petro-Oil Grupa Orlen Rally Team	Mitsubishi	Lancer Evo VI	M	(Poland) Paweł Dytko	(Poland) Tomasz Dytko	3–4
Mitsubishi Ralliart Belgium	Mitsubishi	Carisma GT Evo VI	M	(Belgium) François Duval	(Belgium) Jean-Marc Fortin	3, 6, 13
(Lebanon) Mistral Racing	Mitsubishi	Lancer Evo VI		(Lebanon) Roger Feghali	(France) Bruno Brissart	4
(Russia) Stanislav Gryazin	Mitsubishi	Lancer Evo VI	M	(Russia) Stanislav Gryazin	(Russia) Dmitriy Eremeev	2, 4, 9, 12
(Spain) Escudería Voltregá	Mitsubishi	Lancer Evo VI	M	(Spain) Joan Font	(Spain) Manel Muñoz	4
(Argentina) Luis Perez Companc	Mitsubishi	Lancer Evo VI		(Argentina) Luis Perez Companc	(Argentina) Jose Maria Volta	5
(Argentina) Federico Villagra	Mitsubishi	Lancer Evo VI		(Argentina) Federico Villagra	(Argentina) Javier Villagra	5
(United Kingdom) Alistair Ginley	Mitsubishi	Lancer Evo VI		(United Kingdom) Alistair Ginley	(United Kingdom) John Bennie	6–7, 9, 14
(Cyprus) Nicholas Mandrides	Mitsubishi	Lancer Evo VI		(Cyprus) Nicholas Mandrides	(Cyprus) Yiannis Ioannou	6
(Greece) Dimitris Drivakos	Mitsubishi	Lancer Evo V	M	(Greece) Dimitris Drivakos	(Greece) Elias Kordas	7
(Finland) Jari Latvala	Mitsubishi	Lancer Evo VI		(Finland) Jari Latvala	(Finland) Kari Mustalahti	8
(Kenya) Azar Anwar	Mitsubishi	Lancer Evo VI		(Kenya) Azar Anwar	(Kenya) Tom Muriuki	8
Mitsubishi Ralliart Finland	Mitsubishi	Carisma GT Evo VI	P	(Finland) Jouko Puhakka	(Finland) Keijo Eerola	9
Mitsubishi Ralliart Finland	Mitsubishi	Carisma GT Evo VI	M	(Finland) Jouni Ampuja	(Finland) Jarmo Lehtinen	9
(Finland) Blue Rose Team	Mitsubishi	Carisma GT Evo VI	M	(Finland) Kristian Sohlberg	(Finland) Jukka Aho	2, 9
(Finland) RallyRent Europe	Mitsubishi	Lancer Evo VI		(Finland) Kaj Kuistila	(Finland) Kari Jokinen	9
(Finland) Jukka Ketomäki	Mitsubishi	Lancer Evo IV		(Finland) Jukka Ketomäki	(Finland) Jani Laaksonen	9
(Finland) Ari Laivola	Mitsubishi	Lancer Evo VI		(Finland) Ari Laivola	(Finland) Markku Laakso	9
(Spain) Ignacio Sanfilippo	Mitsubishi	Lancer Evo VI		(Spain) Ignacio Sanfilippo	(Spain) Víctor Pérez Rodríguez	9
(New Zealand) Reece Jones Rallysport	Mitsubishi	Lancer Evo VI	F	(New Zealand) Reece Jones	(New Zealand) Leo Bult	10, 12–14
(Japan) Advan-Piaa Rally Team	Mitsubishi	Lancer Evo VII	Y	(Japan) Fumio Nutahara	(Japan) Satoshi Hayashi	10, 13
Ralliart New Zealand	Mitsubishi	Lancer Evo VI		(New Zealand) Kevin 'Stumpy' Holmes	(New Zealand) Garry Cowan	10
Ralliart New Zealand	Mitsubishi	Lancer Evo VI		(New Zealand) Ross Meekings	(New Zealand) Alan Glen	10
(Italy) Ralliart Italia	Mitsubishi	Carisma GT Evo VI		(Italy) Alessandro Fiorio	(Italy) Enrico Cantoni	11
(Italy) Varese Corse	Mitsubishi	Lancer Evo VI		(Italy) "Dedo"	(Italy) Alessandro Mari	11
(Italy) Mirco Virag	Mitsubishi	Lancer Evo VI		(Italy) Mirco Virag	(Italy) Massimo Bergna	11
(France) Jean-Marc Sanchez	Mitsubishi	Lancer Evo VI	P	(France) Jean-Marc Sanchez	(France) Jean-François Scelo	12
(France) Jean-Paul Aymé	Mitsubishi	Lancer Evo VI	M	(France) Jean-Paul Aymé	(France) Brigitte Aymé	12
(Australia) Ed Ordynski	Mitsubishi	Lancer Evo VI	M	(Australia) Ed Ordynski	(Australia) Iain Stewart	13
(Finland) Juha Kangas	Mitsubishi	Carisma GT Evo VI		(Finland) Juha Kangas	(Finland) Mika Ovaskainen	13
(Peru) Ramón Ferreyros	Mitsubishi	Lancer Evo VI		(Peru) Ramón Ferreyros	(Mexico) Javier Marín	14
(Netherlands) Peter Bijvelds	Mitsubishi	Lancer Evo 6.5		(Netherlands) Peter Bijvelds	(Netherlands) Piet Bijvelds	14
(Japan) Marlboro Mitsubishi Ralliart	Mitsubishi	Carisma GT Evo VI	M	(Sweden) Thomas Rådström	(Sweden) Tina Thörner	2
(Japan) Marlboro Mitsubishi Ralliart	Mitsubishi	Carisma GT Evo VI	M	(Japan) Katsuhiko Taguchi	(Scotland) Derek Ringer	6
(Japan) Marlboro Mitsubishi Ralliart	Mitsubishi	Carisma GT Evo VI	M	(Finland) Toni Gardemeister	(Finland) Paavo Lukander	9-10
(France) Eddie Mercier	Renault	Clio RS	M	(France) Eddie Mercier	(France) Jean-Michel Véret	1, 4, 9
(Italy) Ciemme Racing	Renault	Clio RS		(Italy) Eugenio Lozza	(Italy) Antonella Fiorendi	11
(France) Richard Bourcier	Renault	Clio RS		(France) Richard Bourcier	(France) Jean-Marc Ducousso	12
(Argentina) Roberto Sanchez	Subaru	Impreza WRX	P	(Argentina) Roberto Sanchez	(Argentina) Edgardo Galindo	5
(Argentina) Esteban Goldenhersch	Subaru	Impreza WRX		(Argentina) Esteban Goldenhersch	(Argentina) Fabian Cretu	5
(Cyprus) Charalambos Timotheou	Subaru	Impreza WRX		(Cyprus) Charalambos Timotheou	(Cyprus) Savvas Laos	6
(Greece) Panagiotis Hatzitsopanis	Subaru	Impreza WRX		(Greece) Panagiotis Hatzitsopanis	(Greece) Konstantinos Stefanis	7
(Kenya) Don Smith	Subaru	Impreza WRX		(Kenya) Don Smith	(Kenya) Adrian Wroe	8
Subaru Rally Team Australia	Subaru	Impreza STi N8	P	(Australia) Cody Crocker	(Australia) Greg Foletta	10
(United Kingdom) David Higgins	Subaru	Impreza WRX	M	(United Kingdom) David Higgins	(United Kingdom) Craig Thorley	14
(Greece) Papadimitriou Team	Subaru	Impreza 555		(Greece) Ioannis Papadimitriou	(United Kingdom) Allan Harryman	14

== Results and standings ==
=== Rally results ===
Rd.	Rally	Overall winners	Group N Cup Winners	Teams cup Winners	Super 1600 winners	Report
1	(Monaco) Monte Carlo	(Japan) No. 7 Marlboro Mitsubishi Ralliart	(Switzerland) No. 44 Olivier Gillet	N/A	N/A	Report
1	(Monaco) Monte Carlo	(Japan) Mitsubishi Lancer Evo 6.5	(Japan) Mitsubishi Lancer Evo VI	N/A	N/A	Report
1	(Monaco) Monte Carlo	(Finland) Tommi Mäkinen (Finland) Risto Mannisenmäki	(Switzerland) Olivier Gillet (Monaco) Freddy Delorme	N/A	N/A	Report
2	Sweden	(France) No. 16 Peugeot Total	No. 28 Mitsubishi Ralliart Sweden	No. 24 Toyota Castrol Team Denmark	N/A	Report
2	Sweden	(France) Peugeot 206 WRC	(Japan) Mitsubishi Lancer Evo VI	(Japan) Toyota Corolla WRC	N/A	Report
2	Sweden	(Finland) Harri Rovanperä (Finland) Risto Pietiläinen	(Sweden) Stig-Olov Walfridsson (Sweden) Lars Bäckman	(Denmark) Henrik Lundgaard (Denmark) Jens-Christian Anker	N/A	Report
3	Portugal	(Japan) No. 7 Marlboro Mitsubishi Ralliart	(Portugal) No. 67 Pedro Dias da Silva	No. 27 Toyota Castrol Team Finland	N/A	Report
3	Portugal	(Japan) Mitsubishi Lancer Evo 6.5	(Japan) Mitsubishi Lancer Evo 6.5	(Japan) Toyota Corolla WRC	N/A	Report
3	Portugal	(Finland) Tommi Mäkinen (Finland) Risto Mannisenmäki	(Portugal) Pedro Dias da Silva (Portugal) Mário Castro	(Finland) Pasi Hagström (Finland) Tero Gardemeister	N/A	Report
4	Spain	(France) No. 2 Peugeot Total	(Italy) No. 27 Top Run SRL	N/A	(France) No. 53 Citroën Sport	Report
4	Spain	(France) Peugeot 206 WRC	(Japan) Mitsubishi Lancer Evo VI	N/A	(France) Citroën Saxo S1600	Report
4	Spain	(France) Didier Auriol (France) Denis Giraudet	(Argentina) Gabriel Pozzo (Argentina) Daniel Stillo	N/A	(France) Sébastien Loeb (Monaco) Daniel Elena	Report
5	Argentina	(United Kingdom) No. 4 Ford Motor Co	(Italy) No. 21 Top Run SRL	N/A	N/A	Report
5	Argentina	(United Kingdom) Ford Focus RS WRC '01	(Japan) Mitsubishi Lancer Evo VI	N/A	N/A	Report
5	Argentina	(United Kingdom) Colin McRae (United Kingdom) Nicky Grist	(Argentina) Gabriel Pozzo (Argentina) Daniel Stillo	N/A	N/A	Report
6	Cyprus	(United Kingdom) No. 4 Ford Motor Co	(Uruguay) No. 29 Gustavo Trelles	No. 26 Toyota Castrol Team Finland	N/A	Report
6	Cyprus	(United Kingdom) Ford Focus RS WRC '01	(Japan) Mitsubishi Lancer Evo VI	(Japan) Toyota Corolla WRC	N/A	Report
6	Cyprus	(United Kingdom) Colin McRae (United Kingdom) Nicky Grist	(Uruguay) Gustavo Trelles (Argentina) Jorge Del Buono	(Finland) Pasi Hagström (Finland) Tero Gardemeister	N/A	Report
7	Greece	(United Kingdom) No. 4 Ford Motor Co	(Italy) No. 32 Top Run SRL	No. 24 Toyota Castrol Team Denmark	(France) No. 53 Citroën Sport	Report
7	Greece	(United Kingdom) Ford Focus RS WRC '01	(Japan) Mitsubishi Lancer Evo VI	(Japan) Toyota Corolla WRC	(France) Citroën Saxo S1600	Report
7	Greece	(United Kingdom) Colin McRae (United Kingdom) Nicky Grist	(Argentina) Gabriel Pozzo (Argentina) Daniel Stillo	(Denmark) Henrik Lundgaard (Denmark) Jens-Christian Anker	(France) Sébastien Loeb (Monaco) Daniel Elena	Report
8	Kenya	(Japan) No. 7 Marlboro Mitsubishi Ralliart	(Italy) No. 22 Top Run SRL	N/A	N/A	Report
8	Kenya	(Japan) Mitsubishi Lancer Evo 6.5	(Japan) Mitsubishi Lancer Evo VI	N/A	N/A	Report
8	Kenya	(Finland) Tommi Mäkinen (Finland) Risto Mannisenmäki	(Argentina) Gabriel Pozzo (Argentina) Daniel Stillo	N/A	N/A	Report
9	Finland	(France) No. 1 Peugeot Total	(Italy) No. 47 Top Run SRL	N/A	(France) No. 53 Citroën Sport	Report
9	Finland	(France) Peugeot 206 WRC	(Japan) Mitsubishi Lancer Evo VI	N/A	(France) Citroën Saxo S1600	Report
9	Finland	(Finland) Marcus Grönholm (Finland) Timo Rautiainen	(Argentina) Marcos Ligato (Argentina) Rubén García	N/A	(France) Sébastien Loeb (Monaco) Daniel Elena	Report
10	New Zealand	(Japan) No. 5 Subaru World Rally Team	(Austria) No. 37 Stohl Racing	N/A	N/A	Report
10	New Zealand	(Japan) Subaru Impreza S7 WRC '01	(Japan) Mitsubishi Lancer Evo VI	N/A	N/A	Report
10	New Zealand	(United Kingdom) Richard Burns (United Kingdom) Robert Reid	(Austria) Manfred Stohl (Austria) Peter Müller	N/A	N/A	Report
11	Italy	(France) No. 16 Peugeot Total	(Italy) No. 78 Ralliart Italia	No. 24 Toyota Castrol Team Denmark	(Italy) No. 52 R&D Motorsport	Report
11	Italy	(France) Peugeot 206 WRC	(Japan) Mitsubishi Carisma GT Evo VI	(Japan) Toyota Corolla WRC	(Italy) Fiat Punto S1600	Report
11	Italy	(France) Gilles Panizzi (France) Herve Panizzi	(Italy) Alessandro Fiorio (Italy) Enrico Cantoni	(Denmark) Henrik Lundgaard (Denmark) Jens-Christian Anker	(Italy) Andrea Dallavilla (Italy) Giovanni Bernacchini	Report
12	France	(France) No. 15 Citroën Sport	(Uruguay) No. 28 Gustavo Trelles	N/A	(France) No. 53 Citroën Sport	Report
12	France	(France) Citroën Xsara WRC	(Japan) Mitsubishi Lancer Evo VI	N/A	(France) Citroën Saxo S1600	Report
12	France	(Spain) Jesús Puras (Spain) Marc Martí	(Uruguay) Gustavo Trelles (Argentina) Jorge Del Buono	N/A	(France) Sébastien Loeb (Monaco) Daniel Elena	Report
13	Australia	(France) No. 1 Peugeot Total	(Japan) No. 28 Mitsubishi Ralliart	No. 24 Oman Arab World Rally Team	N/A	Report
13	Australia	(France) Peugeot 206 WRC	(Japan) Mitsubishi Lancer Evo VI	(Japan) Subaru Impreza S7 WRC '01	N/A	Report
13	Australia	(Finland) Marcus Grönholm (Finland) Timo Rautiainen	(Australia) Ed Ordynski (Australia) Iain Stewart	(Oman) Hamed Al-Wahaibi (New Zealand) Tony Sircombe	N/A	Report
14	(United Kingdom) Britain	(France) No. 1 Peugeot Total	(United Kingdom) No. 38 David Higgins	N/A	N/A	Report
14	(United Kingdom) Britain	(France) Peugeot 206 WRC	(Japan) Subaru Impreza S6 WRX	N/A	N/A	Report
14	(United Kingdom) Britain	(Finland) Marcus Grönholm (Finland) Timo Rautiainen	(United Kingdom) David Higgins (United Kingdom) Craig Thorley	N/A	N/A	Report

=== Scoring system ===
Points were awarded to the top six classified finishers in each event.

Position	1st	2nd	3rd	4th	5th	6th
Points	10	6	4	3	2	1

=== Drivers' championship ===
Pos.	Driver	MON (Monaco)	SWE (Sweden)	POR (Portugal)	ESP (Spain)	ARG (Argentina)	CYP (Cyprus)	GRE (Greece)	KEN (Kenya)	FIN (Finland)	NZL (New Zealand)	ITA (Italy)	FRA (France)	AUS (Australia)	GBR (United Kingdom)	Pts
1	(United Kingdom) Richard Burns	Ret	16	4	7	2	2	Ret	Ret	2	1	Ret	4	2	3	44
2	(United Kingdom) Colin McRae	Ret	9	Ret	Ret	1	1	1	Ret	3	2	8	11	5	Ret	42
3	(Finland) Tommi Mäkinen	1	Ret	1	3	4	Ret	4	1	Ret	8	Ret	Ret	6	Ret	41
4	(Finland) Marcus Grönholm	Ret	Ret	3	Ret	Ret	Ret	Ret	Ret	1	5	7	Ret	1	1	36
5	(Finland) Harri Rovanperä		1	Ret		Ret	Ret	3	2	4	3	11	7	4	2	36
6	(Spain) Carlos Sainz	2	3	2	5	3	3	Ret	Ret	6	4	4	Ret	8	Ret	33
7	(France) Didier Auriol	Ret	Ret	8	1	Ret	Ret	Ret	Ret	Ret	6	3	3	3	7	23
8	(France) Gilles Panizzi	Ret		12	2		Ret	Ret		14		1	2	9	Ret	22
9	(France) François Delecour	3	5	5	6	7	Ret	5	4	Ret	12	6	10	Ret		15
10	(Norway) Petter Solberg	Ret	6	Ret	Ret	5	Ret	2	Ret	7	7	9	5	7	Ret	11
11	(Spain) Jesús Puras	Ret			Ret							Ret	1			10
12	(Germany) Armin Schwarz	4	Ret	Ret	Ret	Ret	9	7	3	15		Ret	Ret		5	9
13	(Belgium) Freddy Loix	6	13	Ret	4	6	5	9	5	10	11	12	12	11	Ret	9
14	(France) Sébastien Loeb	15	Ret		15			19		28		2	13		Ret	6
15	(Sweden) Thomas Rådström		2	Ret				Ret								6
16	(Finland) Toni Gardemeister	5	4							Ret	15					5
17	(United Kingdom) Alister McRae	7	Ret	6	11	9	7	15		13	9	Ret	9	10	4	4
18	(Japan) Toshihiro Arai			Ret		8	4	Ret	Ret		14	Ret	Ret	Ret	10	3
19	(Estonia) Markko Märtin	Ret	12	Ret	Ret			Ret		5		Ret	6		Ret	3
20	(Italy) Renato Travaglia											5				2
21	(France) Philippe Bugalski	14		Ret	8			6				Ret	Ret			1
22	(Sweden) Kenneth Eriksson		8	7		Ret	Ret	Ret		12	10			12	6	1
23	(Finland) Pasi Hagström		Ret	10			6	Ret		9		Ret		16		1
24	(Argentina) Gabriel Pozzo	12		Ret	18	10	13	13	6	26	18	23		18		1
Pos.	Driver	MON (Monaco)	SWE (Sweden)	POR (Portugal)	ESP (Spain)	ARG (Argentina)	CYP (Cyprus)	GRE (Greece)	KEN (Kenya)	FIN (Finland)	NZL (New Zealand)	ITA (Italy)	FRA (France)	AUS (Australia)	GBR (United Kingdom)	Pts

Key
Colour	Result
Gold	Winner
Silver	2nd place
Bronze	3rd place
Green	Points finish
Blue	Non-points finish
Blue	Non-classified finish (NC)
Purple	Did not finish (Ret)
Black	Excluded (EX)
Black	Disqualified (DSQ)
White	Did not start (DNS)
White	Cancelled (C)
Blank	Withdrew entry from the event (WD)

=== Manufacturers' championship ===
Pos.	Manufacturer	No.	MON (Monaco)	SWE (Sweden)	POR (Portugal)	ESP (Spain)	ARG (Argentina)	CYP (Cyprus)	GRE (Greece)	KEN (Kenya)	FIN (Finland)	NZL (New Zealand)	ITA (Italy)	FRA (France)	AUS (Australia)	GBR (United Kingdom)	Points
1	(France) Peugeot Total	1	Ret	Ret	3	(Ret)	Ret	Ret	Ret	Ret	1	4	(7)	(Ret)	1	1	106
1	(France) Peugeot Total	2	Ret	Ret	7	1	Ret	Ret	Ret			5	2	2			106
1	(France) Peugeot Total	16				2				2	4		1	1	3	2	106
2	(United Kingdom) Ford Motor Co	3	2	2	2	5	3	3	Ret	Ret	5	3	3	Ret	7	Ret	86
2	(United Kingdom) Ford Motor Co	4	Ret	5	Ret	Ret	1	1	1	Ret	3	2	4	7	4	Ret	86
3	(Japan) Marlboro Mitsubishi Ralliart	7	1	Ret	1	3	4	Ret	3	1	Ret	7	Ret	Ret	5	Ret	69
3	(Japan) Marlboro Mitsubishi Ralliart	8	4		Ret	4	6	4	5	4			6	8	9	Ret	69
3	(Japan) Marlboro Mitsubishi Ralliart	19		1							Ret	10					69
4	(Japan) 555 Subaru World Rally Team	5	Ret	7	4	6	2	2	Ret	Ret	2	1	Ret	3	2	3	66
4	(Japan) 555 Subaru World Rally Team	6	Ret	3	Ret	Ret	5	Ret	2	Ret	6	6	5	4	6	Ret	66
4	(Japan) 555 Subaru World Rally Team	18												(5)			66
5	(Czech Republic) Škoda Motorsport	11	3	Ret	Ret	Ret	Ret	7	4	3	8		Ret	Ret		5	17
5	(Czech Republic) Škoda Motorsport	12	6	6	Ret	7	Ret	6	6	Ret	9		7	Ret		8	17
6	(South Korea) Hyundai World Rally Team	9	Ret	4	6	Ret	Ret	Ret	Ret		7	9	Ret	5	10	6	17
6	(South Korea) Hyundai World Rally Team	10	5	Ret	5	8	7	5	7			8	Ret	6	8	4	17
6	(South Korea) Hyundai World Rally Team	20									Ret						17
Pos.	Manufacturer	No.	MON (Monaco)	SWE (Sweden)	POR (Portugal)	ESP (Spain)	ARG (Argentina)	CYP (Cyprus)	GRE (Greece)	KEN (Kenya)	FIN (Finland)	NZL (New Zealand)	ITA (Italy)	FRA (France)	AUS (Australia)	GBR (United Kingdom)	Points

Key
Colour	Result
Gold	Winner
Silver	2nd place
Bronze	3rd place
Green	Points finish
Blue	Non-points finish
Blue	Non-classified finish (NC)
Purple	Did not finish (Ret)
Black	Excluded (EX)
Black	Disqualified (DSQ)
White	Did not start (DNS)
White	Cancelled (C)
Blank	Withdrew entry from the event (WD)

=== FIA Teams Cup ===
Pos.	Driver	SWE (Sweden)	POR (Portugal)	CYP (Cyprus)	GRE (Greece)	ITA (Italy)	AUS (Australia)	Pts
1	(Denmark) Henrik Lundgaard	1	Ret	Ret	1	1	2	36
2	(Finland) Pasi Hagström	Ret	1	1	Ret	Ret	3	24
3	(Oman) Hamed Al-Wahaibi	Ret	2	Ret	Ret	Ret	1	16
4	(Saudi Arabia) Abdullah Bakhashab	4	Ret	2	2	Ret	Ret	15
5	(Sweden) Stig Blomqvist	2	Ret	Ret	Ret	3	4	13
6	(United Kingdom) Natalie Barrett	7	Ret	3	4	Ret	5	9
7	(United Kingdom) Nigel Heath	6	4	Ret	Ret	Ret	Ret	4
NC	(Greece) Ioannis Papadimitriou	Ret	3	Ret	3	2		0 (14)
NC	(Poland) Janusz Kulig	3	Ret					0 (4)
NC	(France) Frédéric Dor	5	Ret	Ret				0 (2)
Pos.	Driver	SWE (Sweden)	POR (Portugal)	CYP (Cyprus)	GRE (Greece)	ITA (Italy)	AUS (Australia)	Pts

Key
Colour	Result
Gold	Winner
Silver	2nd place
Bronze	3rd place
Green	Points finish
Blue	Non-points finish
Blue	Non-classified finish (NC)
Purple	Did not finish (Ret)
Black	Excluded (EX)
Black	Disqualified (DSQ)
White	Did not start (DNS)
White	Cancelled (C)
Blank	Withdrew entry from the event (WD)

=== JWRC Drivers' championship ===
Pos.	Driver	ESP (Spain)	GRE (Greece)	FIN (Finland)	ITA (Italy)	FRA (France)	GBR (United Kingdom)	Pts
1	(France) Sébastien Loeb	1	1	1		1	1	50
2	(Italy) Andrea Dallavilla	5	2	2	1	2	Ret	30
3	(United Kingdom) Niall McShea	Ret	Ret	Ret	4	4	2	12
4	(Belgium) Larry Cols	Ret	Ret	4	3	11	3	11
5	(Italy) Giandomenico Basso	2	Ret	Ret	Ret	3	Ret	10
6	(Norway) Martin Stenshorne	4	3	Ret	8	6	Ret	8
7	(Belgium) François Duval	Ret	Ret	Ret	2	Ret	Ret	6
8	(Italy) Corrado Fontana	3	Ret	5	7	Ret	Ret	6
9	(Finland) Jussi Välimäki	Ret	7	3	Ret	12	Ret	4
10	(Paraguay) Alejandro Galanti	Ret	Ret	6	12	10	4	4
11	(France) Patrick Magaud	Ret	5	Ret	5		Ret	4
12	(France) Cédric Robert	7	4	Ret	Ret	Ret	Ret	3
13	(Spain) Sergio Vallejo	Ret	Ret	Ret	6	5	Ret	3
14	(Malaysia) Saladin Mazlan	Ret	8	Ret	11	Ret	5	2
15	(Italy) Massimo Ceccato	Ret	6	Ret	Ret	9	6	2
16	(Italy) Christian Chemin	6	Ret	Ret	Ret	Ret	8	1
Pos.	Driver	ESP (Spain)	GRE (Greece)	FIN (Finland)	ITA (Italy)	FRA (France)	GBR (United Kingdom)	Pts

Key
Colour	Result
Gold	Winner
Silver	2nd place
Bronze	3rd place
Green	Points finish
Blue	Non-points finish
Blue	Non-classified finish (NC)
Purple	Did not finish (Ret)
Black	Excluded (EX)
Black	Disqualified (DSQ)
White	Did not start (DNS)
White	Cancelled (C)
Blank	Withdrew entry from the event (WD)

=== Production World Rally Championship ===
Pos.	Driver	MON (Monaco)	SWE (Sweden)	POR (Portugal)	ESP (Spain)	ARG (Argentina)	CYP (Cyprus)	GRE (Greece)	KEN (Kenya)	FIN (Finland)	NZL (New Zealand)	ITA (Italy)	FRA (France)	AUS (Australia)	GBR (United Kingdom)	Pts
1	(Argentina) Gabriel Pozzo	4		Ret	1	1	3	1	1	2	2	2		2		71
2	(Uruguay) Gustavo Trelles	3		Ret	Ret	2	1	2				Ret	1			36
3	(Austria) Manfred Stohl	2		Ret			2				1			6		23
4	(Argentina) Marcos Ligato	5		Ret	Ret	Ret	Ret	3	2	1	Ret	Ret		11		36
5	(Sweden) Stig Blomqvist		3	Ret	3	Ret	Ret	Ret	Ret		4	4		7	4	17
6	(Switzerland) Olivier Gillet	1														10
7	(Sweden) Stig-Olov Walfridsson		1													10
8	(Portugal) Pedro Dias da Silva			1												10
9	(Italy) Alex Fiorio											1				10
10	(Australia) Ed Ordynski													1		10
11	(United Kingdom) David Higgins														1	10
12	(United Kingdom) Alistair Ginley						4	Ret		13					3	7
13	(Russia) Stanislav Gryazin		Ret		4					Ret			3			7
14	(Sweden) Kenneth Bäcklund		2							Ret					Ret	6
15	(Portugal) Vítor Pascoal			2												6
16	(Lebanon) Roger Feghali				2											6
17	(France) Jean-Marc Sanchez												2			6
18	(Peru) Ramón Ferreyros														2	6
19	(San Marino) Mirco Baldacci			4			Ret	4		15					Ret	6
20	(Portugal) Pedro Leal			3												4
21	(Argentina) Roberto Sanchez					3										4
22	(Kenya) Anwar Azar								3							4
23	(Finland) Kaj Kuistila									3						4
24	(Japan) Fumio Nutahara										3			Ret		4
25	(Italy) Alfredo De Dominicis											3				4
26	(Belgium) François Duval			Ret			Ret							3		4
27	(France) Eddie Mercier	7			6					23			4			4
Pos.	Driver	MON (Monaco)	SWE (Sweden)	POR (Portugal)	ESP (Spain)	ARG (Argentina)	CYP (Cyprus)	GRE (Greece)	KEN (Kenya)	FIN (Finland)	NZL (New Zealand)	ITA (Italy)	FRA (France)	AUS (Australia)	GBR (United Kingdom)	Pts

Key
Colour	Result
Gold	Winner
Silver	2nd place
Bronze	3rd place
Green	Points finish
Blue	Non-points finish
Blue	Non-classified finish (NC)
Purple	Did not finish (Ret)
Black	Excluded (EX)
Black	Disqualified (DSQ)
White	Did not start (DNS)
White	Cancelled (C)
Blank	Withdrew entry from the event (WD)

== Events ==
Rally name	Start-end date	Podium drivers (Finishing time)	Podium cars
(Monaco) Monte Carlo Rally	19 January–21 January	1. (Finland) Tommi Mäkinen (4h:38m:04.3s); 2. (Spain) Carlos Sainz (4h:39m:05.1s); 3. (France) François Delecour (4h:40m:09.6s)	1. Mitsubishi Lancer Evolution 6.5; 2. Ford Focus RS WRC 01; 3. Ford Focus RS WRC 01
(Sweden) Swedish Rally	9 February–11 February	1. (Finland) Harri Rovanperä (3h:27m:01.1s); 2. (Sweden) Thomas Rådström (3h:27m:29.0s); 3. (Spain) Carlos Sainz (3h:27m:38.1s)	1. Peugeot 206 WRC; 2. Mitsubishi Carisma GT Evo 6.5; 3. Ford Focus RS WRC 01
Rally Portugal	8 March–11 March	1. (Finland) Tommi Mäkinen (3h:46m:42.1s); 2. (Spain) Carlos Sainz (3h:46m:50.7s); 3. (Finland) Marcus Grönholm (3h:49m:37.7s)	1. Mitsubishi Lancer Evolution 6.5; 2. Ford Focus RS WRC 01; 3. Peugeot 206 WRC
(Spain) Rally Catalunya	23 March–25 March	1. (France) Didier Auriol (3h:40m:54.7s); 2. (France) Gilles Panizzi (3h:41m:17.9s); 3. (Finland) Tommi Mäkinen (3h:41m:56.1s)	1. Peugeot 206 WRC; 2. Peugeot 206 WRC; 3. Mitsubishi Lancer Evolution 6.5
Rally Argentina	3 May–6 May	1. (United Kingdom) Colin McRae (4h:18m:25.3s); 2. (United Kingdom) Richard Burns (4h:18m:52.2s); 3. (Spain) Carlos Sainz (4h:20m:11.7s)	1. Ford Focus RS WRC 01; 2. Subaru Impreza WRC2001; 3. Ford Focus RS WRC 01
Cyprus Rally	1 June–3 June	1. (United Kingdom) Colin McRae (5h:07m:32.7s); 2. (United Kingdom) Richard Burns (5h:07m:49.1s); 3. (Spain) Carlos Sainz (5h:07m:59.2s)	1. Ford Focus RS WRC 01; 2. Subaru Impreza WRC2001; 3. Ford Focus RS WRC 01
(Greece) Acropolis Rally	15 June–17 June	1. (United Kingdom) Colin McRae (4h:19m:01.9s); 2. (Norway) Petter Solberg (4h:19m:50.9s); 3. (Finland) Harri Rovanperä (4h:20m:37.6s)	1. Ford Focus RS WRC 01; 2. Subaru Impreza WRC2001; 3. Peugeot 206 WRC
(Kenya) Safari Rally	20 July–22 July	1. (Finland) Tommi Mäkinen (8h:58m:37s); 2. (Finland) Harri Rovanperä (9h:11m:14s); 3. (Germany) Armin Schwarz (9h:16m:12s)	1. Mitsubishi Lancer Evolution 6.5; 2. Peugeot 206 WRC; 3. Škoda Octavia WRC
Rally Finland	24 August–26 August	1. (Finland) Marcus Grönholm (3h:23m:12.8s); 2. (United Kingdom) Richard Burns (3h:23m:37.8s); 3. (United Kingdom) Colin McRae (3h:23m:45.1s)	1. Peugeot 206 WRC; 2. Subaru Impreza WRC2001; 3. Ford Focus RS WRC 01
Rally New Zealand	21 September–23 September	1. (United Kingdom) Richard Burns (3h:47m:28.0s); 2. (United Kingdom) Colin McRae (3h:48m:12.6s); 3. (Finland) Harri Rovanperä (3h:48m:18.1s)	1. Subaru Impreza WRC2001; 2. Ford Focus RS WRC 01; 3. Peugeot 206 WRC
(Italy) Rallye Sanremo	5 October–7 October	1. (France) Gilles Panizzi (4h:05m:49.5s); 2. (France) Sébastien Loeb (4h:06m:00.9s); 3. (France) Didier Auriol (4h:06m:44.4s)	1. Peugeot 206 WRC; 2. Citroen Xsara WRC; 3. Peugeot 206 WRC
(France) Tour de Corse	19 October–21 October	1. (Spain) Jesús Puras (3h:58m:35.5s); 2. (France) Gilles Panizzi (3h:58m:53.0s); 3. (France) Didier Auriol (3h:59m:47.4s)	1. Citroen Xsara WRC; 2. Peugeot 206 WRC; 3. Peugeot 206 WRC
Rally Australia	1 November–4 November	1. (Finland) Marcus Grönholm (3h:17m:01.3s); 2. (United Kingdom) Richard Burns (3h:17m:41.7s); 3. (France) Didier Auriol (3h:18m:21.4s)	1. Peugeot 206 WRC; 2. Subaru Impreza WRC2001; 3. Peugeot 206 WRC
(United Kingdom) Rally of Great Britain	22 November–25 November	1. (Finland) Marcus Grönholm (3h:23m:44.8s); 2. (Finland) Harri Rovanperä (3h:26m:11.9s); 3. (United Kingdom) Richard Burns (3h:27m:00.2s)	1. Peugeot 206 WRC; 2. Peugeot 206 WRC; 3. Subaru Impreza WRC2001
