= Henrik Lundgaard =

Danish rally driver (born 1969)

Personal information
- Nationality: (Denmark) Danish
- Born: February 26, 1969 (age 57); Hedensted, Denmark

World Rally Championship record
- Years active: 1995, 1997-2001
- Co-driver: (Denmark) Freddy Pedersen (Denmark) Henrik Vestergaard (Denmark) Jens-Christian Anker
- Teams: Toyota Castrol Team Denmark
- Rallies: 17
- Championships: 0
- Rally wins: 0
- Podiums: 0
- Stage wins: 0
- Total points: 1
- First rally: 1995 Rallye Monte Carlo
- Last rally: 2001 Rally Australia

Henrik Lundgaard (born 26 February 1969) is a Danish rally driver. In 2000, he won the European Rally Championship in a Toyota Corolla WRC and in 2001 he won the FIA Teams Cup. He has also been a driver on the race track as well, competing in one season of the European Touring Car Cup (2007), and also the Danish Touringcar Championship (2nd in 2004, 2008).

He scored World Rally Championship points in 1997 as well.

Lundgaard's sons Christian and Daniel are also racing drivers Christian is currently competing in the NTT IndyCar Series.

Sporting positions
Preceded by Enrico Bertone	European Rally Champion; 2000	Succeeded by Armin Kremer
