= 2002 Rally Finland =

Motor rally competition

2002 Rally Finland 52nd Neste Rally Finland
Round 9 of the 2002 World Rally Championship season
← Previous event	Next event →
- Host country: Finland
- Rally base: Jyväskylä
- Dates run: August 8, 2002 – August 11, 2002
- Stages: 22 (401.68 km; 249.59 miles)
- Stage surface: Gravel
- Overall distance: 1,703.32 km (1,058.39 miles)

Statistics
- Crews: 77 at start, 30 at finish

Overall results
- Overall winner: (Finland) Marcus Grönholm (Finland) Timo Rautiainen (France) Peugeot Total; Peugeot 206 WRC

The 2002 Rally Finland (formally the 52nd Neste Rally Finland) was the ninth round of the 2002 World Rally Championship. The race was held over four days between 8 August and 11 August 2002 and was won by Peugeot's Marcus Grönholm, his 10th win in the World Rally Championship.

== Background ==
=== Entry list ===
No.	Driver	Co-Driver	Entrant	Car	Tyre
World Rally Championship manufacturer entries
1	(United Kingdom) Richard Burns	(United Kingdom) Robert Reid	(France) Peugeot Total	Peugeot 206 WRC	MI
2	(Finland) Marcus Grönholm	(Finland) Timo Rautiainen	(France) Peugeot Total	Peugeot 206 WRC	MI
3	(Finland) Harri Rovanperä	(Finland) Voitto Silander	(France) Peugeot Total	Peugeot 206 WRC	MI
4	(Spain) Carlos Sainz	(Spain) Luis Moya	(United Kingdom) Ford Motor Co. Ltd.	Ford Focus RS WRC '02	P
5	(United Kingdom) Colin McRae	(United Kingdom) Nicky Grist	(United Kingdom) Ford Motor Co. Ltd.	Ford Focus RS WRC '02	P
6	(Estonia) Markko Märtin	(United Kingdom) Michael Park	(United Kingdom) Ford Motor Co. Ltd.	Ford Focus RS WRC '02	P
7	(France) François Delecour	(France) Daniel Grataloup	(Japan) Marlboro Mitsubishi Ralliart	Mitsubishi Lancer WRC2	MI
8	(United Kingdom) Alister McRae	(United Kingdom) David Senior	(Japan) Marlboro Mitsubishi Ralliart	Mitsubishi Lancer WRC2	MI
9	(Finland) Jani Paasonen	(Finland) Arto Kapanen	(Japan) Marlboro Mitsubishi Ralliart	Mitsubishi Lancer WRC2	MI
10	(Finland) Tommi Mäkinen	(Finland) Kaj Lindström	(Japan) 555 Subaru World Rally Team	Subaru Impreza S8 WRC '02	P
11	(Norway) Petter Solberg	(United Kingdom) Phil Mills	(Japan) 555 Subaru World Rally Team	Subaru Impreza S7 WRC '01	P
14	(Sweden) Kenneth Eriksson	(Sweden) Tina Thörner	(Czech Republic) Škoda Motorsport	Škoda Octavia WRC Evo3	MI
15	(Finland) Toni Gardemeister	(Finland) Paavo Lukander	(Czech Republic) Škoda Motorsport	Škoda Octavia WRC Evo3	MI
17	(Germany) Armin Schwarz	(Germany) Manfred Hiemer	(South Korea) Hyundai Castrol World Rally Team	Hyundai Accent WRC3	MI
18	(Belgium) Freddy Loix	(Belgium) Sven Smeets	(South Korea) Hyundai Castrol World Rally Team	Hyundai Accent WRC3	MI
19	(Finland) Juha Kankkunen	(Finland) Juha Repo	(South Korea) Hyundai Castrol World Rally Team	Hyundai Accent WRC3	MI
World Rally Championship entries
20	(Sweden) Thomas Rådström	(France) Denis Giraudet	(France) Automobiles Citroën	Citroën Xsara WRC	MI
21	(France) Sébastien Loeb	(Monaco) Daniel Elena	(France) Automobiles Citroën	Citroën Xsara WRC	MI
24	(Belgium) François Duval	(Belgium) Jean-Marc Fortin	(United Kingdom) Ford Motor Co. Ltd.	Ford Focus RS WRC '02	P
25	(Finland) Sebastian Lindholm	(Finland) Timo Hantunen	Peugeot Sport Finland	Peugeot 206 WRC	MI
26	(Germany) Armin Kremer	(Germany) Dieter Schneppenheim	(Germany) Armin Kremer	Ford Focus RS WRC '01	P
27	(Finland) Juuso Pykälistö	(Finland) Esko Mertsalmi	(Finland) Juuso Pykälistö	Peugeot 206 WRC	—N/a
28	(Finland) Janne Tuohino	(Finland) Petri Vihavainen	(Finland) LPM Racing	Ford Focus RS WRC '01	—N/a
30	(Finland) Jussi Välimäki	(Finland) Tero Gardemeister	(Finland) Jussi Välimäki	Toyota Corolla WRC	—N/a
31	(Norway) Henning Solberg	(Norway) Cato Menkerud	(Norway) Henning Solberg	Toyota Corolla WRC	—N/a
32	(Finland) Kaj Kuistila	(Finland) Kari Jokinen	(Finland) Kaj Kuistila	Mitsubishi Lancer Evo 6.5	—N/a
33	(Finland) Timo Salonen	(Finland) Launo Heinonen	(Finland) Timo Salonen	Peugeot 206 WRC	MI
34	(Poland) Tomasz Kuchar	(Poland) Maciej Szczepaniak	(Poland) Tomasz Kuchar	Toyota Corolla WRC	MI
35	(Finland) Jari Viita	(Finland) Riku Rousku	(Finland) Jari Viita	Ford Focus RS WRC '01	—N/a
36	(Estonia) Urmo Aava	(Estonia) Toomas Kitsing	(Estonia) Urmo Aava	Ford Focus RS WRC '99	—N/a
131	(Italy) Fabrizio De Sanctis	(Italy) Iacopo Innocenti	(Italy) Fabrizio De Sanctis	Mitsubishi Lancer Evo VI	—N/a
PWRC entries
52	(Argentina) Marcos Ligato	(Argentina) Rubén García	(Italy) Top Run SRL	Mitsubishi Lancer Evo VII	—N/a
53	(Italy) Alessandro Fiorio	(Italy) Vittorio Brambilla	(Italy) Ralliart Italia	Mitsubishi Lancer Evo VII	P
54	(Peru) Ramón Ferreyros	(Spain) Diego Vallejo	(Italy) Mauro Rally Tuning	Mitsubishi Lancer Evo VII	—N/a
65	(Austria) Beppo Harrach	(Austria) Peter Müller	(Austria) Stohl Racing	Mitsubishi Lancer Evo VI	—N/a
66	(Bulgaria) Dimitar Iliev	(Bulgaria) Petar Sivov	(Italy) Mauro Rally Tuning	Mitsubishi Lancer Evo VII	—N/a
67	(Finland) Marko Ipatti	(Finland) Kari Kajula	(Finland) RallyRent Europe	Mitsubishi Carisma GT Evo VI	—N/a
69	(Norway) Bernt Kollevold	(Norway) Ola Fløene	(Norway) Kollevold Rally Team	Mitsubishi Lancer Evo VI	—N/a
70	(Italy) Giovanni Manfrinato	(Italy) Claudio Condotta	(Italy) Top Run SRL	Mitsubishi Lancer Evo VI	—N/a
72	(Sweden) Joakim Roman	(Sweden) Ingrid Mitakidou	(Sweden) Milbrooks World Rally Team	Mitsubishi Lancer Evo V	—N/a
73	(United Kingdom) Martin Rowe	(United Kingdom) Chris Wood	(United Kingdom) David Sutton Cars Ltd	Mitsubishi Lancer Evo VII	—N/a
74	(Malaysia) Karamjit Singh	(Malaysia) Allen Oh	(Malaysia) Petronas EON Racing Team	Proton Pert	—N/a
75	(Finland) Kristian Sohlberg	(Finland) Jakke Honkanen	Mitsubishi Ralliart Finland	Mitsubishi Lancer Evo VII	—N/a
76	(Czech Republic) Pavel Valoušek	(Italy) Pierangelo Scalvini	(Italy) Jolly Club	Mitsubishi Lancer Evo VII	—N/a
77	(Italy) Alfredo De Dominicis	(Italy) Rudy Pollet	Ralliart Italy	Mitsubishi Lancer Evo VII	—N/a

=== Itinerary ===
All dates and times are EEST (UTC+3).

Date	Time	No.	Stage name	Distance
Leg 1 — 130.67 km
8 August	19:00	SS1	SSS Killeri 1	2.06 km
9 August	09:06	SS2	Valkola	8.42 km
9 August	09:49	SS3	Lankamaa 1	23.44 km
9 August	10:37	SS4	Laukaa 1	11.80 km
9 August	12:34	SS5	Mökkiperä	13.38 km
9 August	13:12	SS6	Palsankylä	25.48 km
9 August	15:49	SS7	Ruuhimäki	8.79 km
9 August	16:37	SS8	Laukaa 2	11.80 km
9 August	17:29	SS9	Lankamaa 2	23.44 km
9 August	20:11	SS10	SSS Killeri 2	2.06 km
Leg 2 — 176.65 km
10 August	08:16	SS11	Talviainen	25.74 km
10 August	08:56	SS12	Ouninpohja 1	34.13 km
10 August	12:24	SS13	Moksi — Leustu	40.84 km
10 August	13:31	SS14	Ehikki	14.89 km
10 August	17:28	SS15	Ouninpohja 2	25.22 km
10 August	18:16	SS16	Vaheri — Himos	35.83 km
Leg 3 — 94.36 km
11 August	08:46	SS17	Keuruu 1	11.80 km
11 August	09:14	SS18	Jukojärvi 1	22.71 km
11 August	09:57	SS19	Kruununperä 1	12.67 km
11 August	12:45	SS20	Keuruu 2	11.80 km
11 August	13:13	SS21	Jukojärvi 2	22.71 km
11 August	14:06	SS22	Kruununperä 2	12.67 km

== Results ==
=== Overall ===
Pos.	No.	Driver	Co-driver	Team	Car	Time	Difference	Points
1	2	(Finland) Marcus Grönholm	(Finland) Timo Rautiainen	(France) Peugeot Total	Peugeot 206 WRC	3:17:52.5		10
2	1	(United Kingdom) Richard Burns	(United Kingdom) Robert Reid	(France) Peugeot Total	Peugeot 206 WRC	3:19:19.8	+1:27.3	6
3	11	(Norway) Petter Solberg	(United Kingdom) Phil Mills	(Japan) 555 Subaru World Rally Team	Subaru Impreza S7 WRC '01	3:20:42.1	+2:49.6	4
4	4	(Spain) Carlos Sainz	(Spain) Luis Moya	(United Kingdom) Ford Motor Co. Ltd.	Ford Focus RS WRC '02	3:20:46.3	+2:53.8	3
5	6	(Estonia) Markko Märtin	(United Kingdom) Michael Park	(United Kingdom) Ford Motor Co. Ltd.	Ford Focus RS WRC '02	3:21:02.5	+3:10.0	2
6	10	(Finland) Tommi Mäkinen	(Finland) Kaj Lindström	(Japan) 555 Subaru World Rally Team	Subaru Impreza S8 WRC '02	3:22:26.6	+4:34.1	1

=== World Rally Cars ===
==== Classification ====
Position		No.	Driver	Co-driver	Entrant	Car	Time	Difference	Points
Event	Class	No.	Driver	Co-driver	Entrant	Car	Time	Difference	Points
1	1	2	(Finland) Marcus Grönholm	(Finland) Timo Rautiainen	(France) Peugeot Total	Peugeot 206 WRC	3:17:52.5		10
2	2	1	(United Kingdom) Richard Burns	(United Kingdom) Robert Reid	(France) Peugeot Total	Peugeot 206 WRC	3:19:19.8	+1:27.3	6
3	3	11	(Norway) Petter Solberg	(United Kingdom) Phil Mills	(Japan) 555 Subaru World Rally Team	Subaru Impreza S7 WRC '01	3:20:42.1	+2:49.6	4
4	4	4	(Spain) Carlos Sainz	(Spain) Luis Moya	(United Kingdom) Ford Motor Co. Ltd.	Ford Focus RS WRC '02	3:20:46.3	+2:53.8	3
5	5	6	(Estonia) Markko Märtin	(United Kingdom) Michael Park	(United Kingdom) Ford Motor Co. Ltd.	Ford Focus RS WRC '02	3:21:02.5	+3:10.0	2
6	6	10	(Finland) Tommi Mäkinen	(Finland) Kaj Lindström	(Japan) 555 Subaru World Rally Team	Subaru Impreza S8 WRC '02	3:22:26.6	+4:34.1	1
8	7	9	(Finland) Jani Paasonen	(Finland) Arto Kapanen	(Japan) Marlboro Mitsubishi Ralliart	Mitsubishi Lancer WRC	3:23:47.8	+5:55.3	0
9	8	18	(Belgium) Freddy Loix	(Belgium) Sven Smeets	(South Korea) Hyundai Castrol World Rally Team	Hyundai Accent WRC3	3:24:00.3	+6:07.8	0
12	9	15	(Finland) Toni Gardemeister	(Finland) Paavo Lukander	(Czech Republic) Škoda Motorsport	Škoda Octavia WRC Evo2	3:25:04.5	+7:12.0	0
13	10	17	(Germany) Armin Schwarz	(Germany) Manfred Hiemer	(South Korea) Hyundai Castrol World Rally Team	Hyundai Accent WRC3	3:26:00.7	+8:08.2	0
Retired SS21		5	(United Kingdom) Colin McRae	(United Kingdom) Nicky Grist	(United Kingdom) Ford Motor Co. Ltd.	Ford Focus RS WRC '02	Fire		0
Retired SS18		8	(United Kingdom) Alister McRae	(United Kingdom) David Senior	(Japan) Marlboro Mitsubishi Ralliart	Mitsubishi Lancer WRC	Suspension		0
Retired SS13		3	(Finland) Harri Rovanperä	(Finland) Voitto Silander	(France) Peugeot Total	Peugeot 206 WRC	Lost wheel		0
Retired SS11		19	(Finland) Juha Kankkunen	(Finland) Juha Repo	(South Korea) Hyundai Castrol World Rally Team	Hyundai Accent WRC3	Accident		0
Retired SS9		7	(France) François Delecour	(France) Daniel Grataloup	(Japan) Marlboro Mitsubishi Ralliart	Mitsubishi Lancer WRC	Suspension		0
Retired SS6		14	(Sweden) Kenneth Eriksson	(Sweden) Tina Thörner	(Czech Republic) Škoda Motorsport	Škoda Octavia WRC Evo2	No fuel		0

==== Special stages ====
Day	Stage	Stage name	Length	Winner	Car	Time	Class leaders
Leg 1 (8 Aug)	SS1	SSS Killeri 1	2.06 km	(United Kingdom) Richard Burns	Peugeot 206 WRC	1:16.7	(United Kingdom) Richard Burns
Leg 1 (9 Aug)	SS2	Valkola	8.42 km	(Finland) Marcus Grönholm	Peugeot 206 WRC	4:27.9	(Finland) Marcus Grönholm
Leg 1 (9 Aug)	SS3	Lankamaa 1	23.44 km	(United Kingdom) Richard Burns	Peugeot 206 WRC	11:28.7	(Finland) Marcus Grönholm
Leg 1 (9 Aug)	SS4	Laukaa 1	11.80 km	(Finland) Harri Rovanperä	Peugeot 206 WRC	5:47.0	(United Kingdom) Richard Burns
Leg 1 (9 Aug)	SS5	Mökkiperä	13.38 km	(United Kingdom) Richard Burns	Peugeot 206 WRC	6:22.6	(United Kingdom) Richard Burns
Leg 1 (9 Aug)	SS6	Palsankylä	25.48 km	(United Kingdom) Richard Burns	Peugeot 206 WRC	13:33.0	(United Kingdom) Richard Burns
Leg 1 (9 Aug)	SS7	Ruuhimäki	8.79 km	(United Kingdom) Richard Burns	Peugeot 206 WRC	4:44.6	(United Kingdom) Richard Burns
Leg 1 (9 Aug)	SS8	Laukaa 2	11.80 km	(Finland) Marcus Grönholm	Peugeot 206 WRC	5:42.9	(United Kingdom) Richard Burns
Leg 1 (9 Aug)	SS9	Lankamaa 2	23.44 km	(United Kingdom) Richard Burns	Peugeot 206 WRC	11:21.5	(United Kingdom) Richard Burns
Leg 1 (9 Aug)	SS10	SSS Killeri 2	2.06 km	(Spain) Carlos Sainz	Ford Focus RS WRC '02	1:17.2	(United Kingdom) Richard Burns
Leg 2 (10 Aug)	SS11	Talviainen	25.74 km	(United Kingdom) Richard Burns	Peugeot 206 WRC	12:47.3	(United Kingdom) Richard Burns
Leg 2 (10 Aug)	SS12	Ouninpohja 1	34.13 km	(Finland) Harri Rovanperä	Peugeot 206 WRC	15:58.6	(Finland) Harri Rovanperä
Leg 2 (10 Aug)	SS13	Moksi — Leustu	40.84 km	(Finland) Marcus Grönholm	Peugeot 206 WRC	20:31.9	(Finland) Marcus Grönholm
Leg 2 (10 Aug)	SS14	Ehikki	14.89 km	(Finland) Marcus Grönholm	Peugeot 206 WRC	6:57.8	(Finland) Marcus Grönholm
Leg 2 (10 Aug)	SS15	Ouninpohja 2	25.22 km	(Finland) Marcus Grönholm	Peugeot 206 WRC	11:26.0	(Finland) Marcus Grönholm
Leg 2 (10 Aug)	SS16	Vaheri — Himos	35.83 km	(United Kingdom) Richard Burns	Peugeot 206 WRC	17:58.0	(Finland) Marcus Grönholm
Leg 3 (11 Aug)	SS17	Keuruu 1	11.80 km	(United Kingdom) Richard Burns	Peugeot 206 WRC	5:28.2	(Finland) Marcus Grönholm
Leg 3 (11 Aug)	SS18	Jukojärvi 1	22.71 km	(United Kingdom) Colin McRae	Ford Focus RS WRC '02	11:11.2	(Finland) Marcus Grönholm
Leg 3 (11 Aug)	SS19	Kruununperä 1	12.67 km	(Norway) Petter Solberg	Subaru Impreza S7 WRC '01	6:06.4	(Finland) Marcus Grönholm
Leg 3 (11 Aug)	SS20	Keuruu 2	11.80 km	(Estonia) Markko Märtin	Ford Focus RS WRC '02	5:20.9	(Finland) Marcus Grönholm
Leg 3 (11 Aug)	SS21	Jukojärvi 2	22.71 km	(Estonia) Markko Märtin	Ford Focus RS WRC '02	11:02.4	(Finland) Marcus Grönholm
Leg 3 (11 Aug)	SS22	Kruununperä 2	12.67 km	(United Kingdom) Richard Burns (Finland) Marcus Grönholm	Peugeot 206 WRC; Peugeot 206 WRC	6:02.2	(Finland) Marcus Grönholm

==== Championship standings ====
Pos.	Drivers' championships			Co-drivers' championships			Manufacturers' championships		
Pos.	Move	Driver	Points	Move	Co-driver	Points	Move	Manufacturer	Points
1		(Finland) Marcus Grönholm	47		(Finland) Timo Rautiainen	47		(France) Peugeot Total	99
2		(United Kingdom) Colin McRae	30		(United Kingdom) Nicky Grist	30		(United Kingdom) Ford Motor Co. Ltd.	74
3		(Spain) Carlos Sainz	26		(Spain) Luis Moya	26		(Japan) 555 Subaru World Rally Team	40
4	1	(United Kingdom) Richard Burns	25	1	(United Kingdom) Robert Reid	25		(Czech Republic) Škoda Motorsport	8
5	1	(France) Gilles Panizzi	21	1	(France) Hervé Panizzi	21		(Japan) Marlboro Mitsubishi Ralliart	7

=== Production World Rally Championship ===
==== Classification ====
Position		No.	Driver	Co-driver	Entrant	Car	Time	Difference	Points
Event	Class	No.	Driver	Co-driver	Entrant	Car	Time	Difference	Points
18	1	53	(Italy) Alessandro Fiorio	(Italy) Vittorio Brambilla	(Italy) Ralliart Italia	Mitsubishi Lancer Evo VII	3:42:41.8		10
20	2	75	(Finland) Kristian Sohlberg	(Finland) Jakke Honkanen	Mitsubishi Ralliart Finland	Mitsubishi Lancer Evo VII	3:45:50.9	+3:09.1	6
22	3	74	(Malaysia) Karamjit Singh	(Malaysia) Allen Oh	(Malaysia) Petronas EON Racing Team	Proton Pert	3:47:11.4	+4:29.6	4
24	4	77	(Italy) Alfredo De Dominicis	(Italy) Rudy Pollet	Ralliart Italy	Mitsubishi Lancer Evo VII	3:51:41.2	+8:59.4	3
26	5	69	(Norway) Bernt Kollevold	(Norway) Ola Fløene	(Norway) Kollevold Rally Team	Mitsubishi Lancer Evo VI	3:58:10.5	+15:28.7	2
Retired SS14		66	(Bulgaria) Dimitar Iliev	(Bulgaria) Petar Sivov	(Italy) Mauro Rally Tuning	Mitsubishi Lancer Evo VII	Mechanical		0
Retired SS13		52	(Argentina) Marcos Ligato	(Argentina) Rubén García	(Italy) Top Run SRL	Mitsubishi Lancer Evo VII	Engine		0
Retired SS12		54	(Peru) Ramón Ferreyros	(Spain) Diego Vallejo	(Italy) Mauro Rally Tuning	Mitsubishi Lancer Evo VII	Engine		0
Retired SS12		65	(Austria) Beppo Harrach	(Austria) Peter Müller	(Austria) Stohl Racing	Mitsubishi Lancer Evo VI	Accident		0
Retired SS6		73	(United Kingdom) Martin Rowe	(United Kingdom) Chris Wood	(United Kingdom) David Sutton Cars Ltd	Mitsubishi Lancer Evo VII	Mechanical		0
Retired SS5		72	(Sweden) Joakim Roman	(Sweden) Ingrid Mitakidou	(Sweden) Milbrooks World Rally Team	Mitsubishi Lancer Evo V	Accident		0
Retired SS4		67	(Finland) Marko Ipatti	(Finland) Kari Kajula	(Finland) RallyRent Europe	Mitsubishi Carisma GT Evo VI	Mechanical		0
Retired SS3		76	(Czech Republic) Pavel Valoušek	(Italy) Pierangelo Scalvini	(Italy) Jolly Club	Mitsubishi Lancer Evo VII	Accident		0
Retired SS2		70	(Italy) Giovanni Manfrinato	(Italy) Claudio Condotta	(Italy) Top Run SRL	Mitsubishi Lancer Evo VI	Mechanical		0

==== Special stages ====
Day	Stage	Stage name	Length	Winner	Car	Time	Class leaders
Leg 1 (8 Aug)	SS1	SSS Killeri 1	2.06 km	(Argentina) Marcos Ligato	Mitsubishi Lancer Evo VII	1:23.2	(Argentina) Marcos Ligato
Leg 1 (9 Aug)	SS2	Valkola	8.42 km	(Argentina) Marcos Ligato	Mitsubishi Lancer Evo VII	4:55.6	(Argentina) Marcos Ligato
Leg 1 (9 Aug)	SS3	Lankamaa 1	23.44 km	(Finland) Kristian Sohlberg	Mitsubishi Lancer Evo VII	12:31.0	(Finland) Kristian Sohlberg
Leg 1 (9 Aug)	SS4	Laukaa 1	11.80 km	(Finland) Kristian Sohlberg	Mitsubishi Lancer Evo VII	6:19.1	(Finland) Kristian Sohlberg
Leg 1 (9 Aug)	SS5	Mökkiperä	13.38 km	(Argentina) Marcos Ligato	Mitsubishi Lancer Evo VII	7:05.7	(Finland) Kristian Sohlberg
Leg 1 (9 Aug)	SS6	Palsankylä	25.48 km	(Argentina) Marcos Ligato	Mitsubishi Lancer Evo VII	14:59.8	(Finland) Kristian Sohlberg
Leg 1 (9 Aug)	SS7	Ruuhimäki	8.79 km	(Argentina) Marcos Ligato	Mitsubishi Lancer Evo VII	5:14.8	(Argentina) Marcos Ligato
Leg 1 (9 Aug)	SS8	Laukaa 2	11.80 km	(Malaysia) Karamjit Singh	Proton Pert	6:32.2	(Finland) Kristian Sohlberg
Leg 1 (9 Aug)	SS9	Lankamaa 2	23.44 km	(Italy) Alessandro Fiorio	Mitsubishi Lancer Evo VII	13:07.9	(Argentina) Marcos Ligato
Leg 1 (9 Aug)	SS10	SSS Killeri 2	2.06 km	(Italy) Alessandro Fiorio (Finland) Kristian Sohlberg	Mitsubishi Lancer Evo VII; Mitsubishi Lancer Evo VII	1:23.4	(Argentina) Marcos Ligato
Leg 2 (10 Aug)	SS11	Talviainen	25.74 km	(Finland) Kristian Sohlberg	Mitsubishi Lancer Evo VII	14:14.8	(Argentina) Marcos Ligato
Leg 2 (10 Aug)	SS12	Ouninpohja 1	34.13 km	(Finland) Kristian Sohlberg	Mitsubishi Lancer Evo VII	17:42.6	(Argentina) Marcos Ligato
Leg 2 (10 Aug)	SS13	Moksi — Leustu	40.84 km	(Italy) Alessandro Fiorio	Mitsubishi Lancer Evo VII	23:42.7	(Italy) Alessandro Fiorio
Leg 2 (10 Aug)	SS14	Ehikki	14.89 km	(Finland) Kristian Sohlberg	Mitsubishi Lancer Evo VII	7:34.3	(Italy) Alessandro Fiorio
Leg 2 (10 Aug)	SS15	Ouninpohja 2	25.22 km	(Finland) Kristian Sohlberg	Mitsubishi Lancer Evo VII	12:35.8	(Italy) Alessandro Fiorio
Leg 2 (10 Aug)	SS16	Vaheri — Himos	35.83 km	Notional stage time			(Italy) Alessandro Fiorio
Leg 3 (11 Aug)	SS17	Keuruu 1	11.80 km	(Finland) Kristian Sohlberg	Mitsubishi Lancer Evo VII	5:56.2	(Italy) Alessandro Fiorio
Leg 3 (11 Aug)	SS18	Jukojärvi 1	22.71 km	(Finland) Kristian Sohlberg	Mitsubishi Lancer Evo VII	12:10.3	(Italy) Alessandro Fiorio
Leg 3 (11 Aug)	SS19	Kruununperä 1	12.67 km	(Finland) Kristian Sohlberg	Mitsubishi Lancer Evo VII	6:45.5	(Italy) Alessandro Fiorio
Leg 3 (11 Aug)	SS20	Keuruu 2	11.80 km	(Finland) Kristian Sohlberg	Mitsubishi Lancer Evo VII	5:54.3	(Italy) Alessandro Fiorio
Leg 3 (11 Aug)	SS21	Jukojärvi 2	22.71 km	(Italy) Alessandro Fiorio	Mitsubishi Lancer Evo VII	12:15.3	(Italy) Alessandro Fiorio
Leg 3 (11 Aug)	SS22	Kruununperä 2	12.67 km	(Finland) Kristian Sohlberg	Mitsubishi Lancer Evo VII	6:43.3	(Italy) Alessandro Fiorio

==== Championship standings ====
Pos.	Drivers' championships		
Pos.	Move	Driver	Points
1		(Malaysia) Karamjit Singh	28
2		(Peru) Ramón Ferreyros	20
3	2	(Finland) Kristian Sohlberg	16
4	7	(Italy) Alessandro Fiorio	13
5	2	(Japan) Toshihiro Arai	12
