= 2005 Rally México =

3rd round of the 2005 World Rally Championship

2005 Rally México 2nd Corona Rally Mexico
Round 3 of the 2005 World Rally Championship season
← Previous event	Next event →
- Host country: Mexico
- Rally base: León, Guanajuato
- Dates run: March 11, 2005 – March 13, 2005
- Stages: 14 (355.97 km; 221.19 miles)
- Stage surface: Gravel
- Overall distance: 928.74 km (577.09 miles)

Statistics
- Crews: 38 at start, 28 at finish

Overall results
- Overall winner: (Norway) Petter Solberg (United Kingdom) Phil Mills (Japan) Subaru World Rally Team; Subaru Impreza S11 WRC '05

The 2005 Rally México (formally the 2nd Corona Rally Mexico) was the third round of the 2005 World Rally Championship. The rally was held over three days between 11 March and 13 March 2005, and was won by Subaru's Petter Solberg, his 12th win in the World Rally Championship.

== Background ==
=== Entry list ===
No.	Driver	Co-Driver	Entrant	Car	Tyre
World Rally Championship manufacturer entries
1	(France) Sébastien Loeb	(Monaco) Daniel Elena	(France) Citroën Total WRT	Citroën Xsara WRC	M
2	(Belgium) François Duval	(Belgium) Stéphane Prévot	(France) Citroën Total WRT	Citroën Xsara WRC	M
3	(Finland) Toni Gardemeister	(Finland) Jakke Honkanen	(United Kingdom) BP Ford World Rally Team	Ford Focus RS WRC '04	M
4	(Spain) Daniel Solà	(Spain) Xavier Amigò	(United Kingdom) BP Ford World Rally Team	Ford Focus RS WRC '04	M
5	(Norway) Petter Solberg	(United Kingdom) Phil Mills	(Japan) Subaru World Rally Team	Subaru Impreza S11 WRC '05	P
6	(Australia) Chris Atkinson	(Australia) Glenn Macneall	(Japan) Subaru World Rally Team	Subaru Impreza S11 WRC '05	P
7	(Finland) Marcus Grönholm	(Finland) Timo Rautiainen	(France) Marlboro Peugeot Total	Peugeot 307 WRC	P
8	(Estonia) Markko Märtin	(United Kingdom) Michael Park	(France) Marlboro Peugeot Total	Peugeot 307 WRC	P
9	(Finland) Harri Rovanperä	(Finland) Risto Pietiläinen	(Japan) Mitsubishi Motors	Mitsubishi Lancer WRC 05	P
10	(France) Gilles Panizzi	(France) Hervé Panizzi	(Japan) Mitsubishi Motors	Mitsubishi Lancer WRC 05	P
11	(Germany) Armin Schwarz	(Germany) Klaus Wicha	(Czech Republic) Škoda Motorsport	Škoda Fabia WRC	M
12	(Finland) Jani Paasonen	(Finland) Jani Vainikka	(Czech Republic) Škoda Motorsport	Škoda Fabia WRC	M
World Rally Championship entries
14	(Czech Republic) Roman Kresta	(Czech Republic) Jan Možný	(United Kingdom) BP Ford World Rally Team	Ford Focus RS WRC '04	M
15	(Germany) Antony Warmbold	(United Kingdom) Michael Orr	(United Kingdom) BP Ford World Rally Team	Ford Focus RS WRC '04	M
16	(Sweden) Tobias Johansson	(Finland) Kaj Lindström	(Sweden) Rally Team Olsbergs	Subaru Impreza S10 WRC '04	P
17	(Spain) Xavier Pons	(Spain) Lucas Cruz	(France) Bozian Racing	Peugeot 206 WRC	M
18	(Mexico) Ricardo Triviño	(Spain) Carlos del Barrio	(Mexico) Ricardo Triviño	Peugeot 206 WRC	M
JWRC entries
31	(Sweden) Per-Gunnar Andersson	(Sweden) Jonas Andersson	(Sweden) Per-Gunnar Andersson	Suzuki Ignis S1600	P
32	(United Kingdom) Guy Wilks	(United Kingdom) Phil Pugh	(United Kingdom) Guy Wilks	Suzuki Ignis S1600	P
39	(Italy) Luca Cecchettini	(Italy) Massimo Daddoveri	(Italy) Luca Cecchettini	Fiat Punto S1600	P
40	(Zimbabwe) Conrad Rautenbach	(United Kingdom) Carl Williamson	(Zimbabwe) Conrad Rautenbach	Citroën Saxo S1600	P
42	(Czech Republic) Pavel Valoušek	(Italy) Pierangelo Scalvini	(Czech Republic) Pavel Valoušek	Suzuki Ignis S1600	P

=== Itinerary ===
All dates and times are CST (UTC-6).

Date	Time	No.	Stage name	Distance
1. leg — 146.84 km
11 March	09:07	SS1	Ibarrilla — El Zauco 1	22.56 km
11 March	10:25	SS2	Ortega — La Esperanza 1	29.06 km
11 March	11:16	SS3	Santana — Cubilete 1	21.80 km
11 March	14:08	SS4	Ibarrilla — El Zauco 2	22.56 km
11 March	15:26	SS5	Ortega — La Esperanza 2	29.06 km
11 March	16:17	SS6	Santana — Cubilete 2	21.80 km
2. leg — 146.48 km
12 March	09:43	SS7	El Zauco — Mesa 1	25.45 km
12 March	11:06	SS8	Duarte — Otates 1	24.23 km
12 March	11:57	SS9	Derramadero — Chichimequillas 1	23.56 km
12 March	15:10	SS10	El Zauco — Mesa 2	25.45 km
12 March	16:33	SS11	Duarte — Otates 2	24.23 km
12 March	17:24	SS12	Derramadero — Chichimequillas 2	23.56 km
3. leg — 62.65 km
13 March	09:17	SS13	Comanjilla — Chichimequillas	18.26 km
13 March	10:25	SS14	Alfaro — El Establo	44.39 km

== Results ==
=== Overall ===
Pos.	No.	Driver	Co-driver	Team	Car	Time	Difference	Points
1	5	(Norway) Petter Solberg	(United Kingdom) Phil Mills	(Japan) Subaru World Rally Team	Subaru Impreza S11 WRC '05	3:41:06.2		10
2	7	(Finland) Marcus Grönholm	(Finland) Timo Rautiainen	(France) Marlboro Peugeot Total	Peugeot 307 WRC	3:41:40.7	+34.5	8
3	8	(Estonia) Markko Märtin	(United Kingdom) Michael Park	(France) Marlboro Peugeot Total	Peugeot 307 WRC	3:42:44.5	+1:38.3	6
4	1	(France) Sébastien Loeb	(Monaco) Daniel Elena	(France) Citroën Total WRT	Citroën Xsara WRC	3:44:57.3	+3:51.1	5
5	9	(Finland) Harri Rovanperä	(Finland) Risto Pietiläinen	(Japan) Mitsubishi Motors	Mitsubishi Lancer WRC 05	3:45:04.3	+3:58.1	4
6	3	(Finland) Toni Gardemeister	(Finland) Jakke Honkanen	(United Kingdom) BP Ford World Rally Team	Ford Focus RS WRC '04	3:45:11.8	+4:05.6	3
7	15	(Germany) Antony Warmbold	(United Kingdom) Michael Orr	(United Kingdom) BP Ford World Rally Team	Ford Focus RS WRC '04	3:47:07.2	+6:01.0	2
8	10	(France) Gilles Panizzi	(France) Hervé Panizzi	(Japan) Mitsubishi Motors	Mitsubishi Lancer WRC 05	3:47:07.9	+6:01.7	1

=== World Rally Cars ===
==== Classification ====
Position		No.	Driver	Co-driver	Entrant	Car	Time	Difference	Points
Event	Class	No.	Driver	Co-driver	Entrant	Car	Time	Difference	Points
1	1	5	(Norway) Petter Solberg	(United Kingdom) Phil Mills	(Japan) Subaru World Rally Team	Subaru Impreza S11 WRC '05	3:41:06.2		10
2	2	7	(Finland) Marcus Grönholm	(Finland) Timo Rautiainen	(France) Marlboro Peugeot Total	Peugeot 307 WRC	3:41:40.7	+34.5	8
3	3	8	(Estonia) Markko Märtin	(United Kingdom) Michael Park	(France) Marlboro Peugeot Total	Peugeot 307 WRC	3:42:44.5	+1:38.3	6
4	4	1	(France) Sébastien Loeb	(Monaco) Daniel Elena	(France) Citroën Total WRT	Citroën Xsara WRC	3:44:57.3	+3:51.1	5
5	5	9	(Finland) Harri Rovanperä	(Finland) Risto Pietiläinen	(Japan) Mitsubishi Motors	Mitsubishi Lancer WRC 05	3:45:04.3	+3:58.1	4
6	6	3	(Finland) Toni Gardemeister	(Finland) Jakke Honkanen	(United Kingdom) BP Ford World Rally Team	Ford Focus RS WRC '04	3:45:11.8	+4:05.6	3
8	7	10	(France) Gilles Panizzi	(France) Hervé Panizzi	(Japan) Mitsubishi Motors	Mitsubishi Lancer WRC 05	3:47:07.9	+6:01.7	1
9	8	11	(Germany) Armin Schwarz	(Germany) Klaus Wicha	(Czech Republic) Škoda Motorsport	Škoda Fabia WRC	3:49:11.5	+8:05.3	0
13	9	12	(Finland) Jani Paasonen	(Finland) Jani Vainikka	(Czech Republic) Škoda Motorsport	Škoda Fabia WRC	4:10:11.0	+29:04.8	0
Retired SS14		2	(Belgium) François Duval	(Belgium) Stéphane Prévot	(France) Citroën Total WRT	Citroën Xsara WRC	Mechanical		0
Retired SS14		6	(Australia) Chris Atkinson	(Australia) Glenn Macneall	(Japan) Subaru World Rally Team	Subaru Impreza S11 WRC '05	Accident		0
Retired SS11		4	(Spain) Daniel Solà	(Spain) Xavier Amigò	(United Kingdom) BP Ford World Rally Team	Ford Focus RS WRC '04	Accident		0

==== Special stages ====
Day	Stage	Stage name	Length	Winner	Car	Time	Class leaders
1. leg (11 Mar)	SS1	Ibarrilla — El Zauco 1	22.56 km	(Norway) Petter Solberg	Subaru Impreza S11 WRC '05	13:25.4	(Norway) Petter Solberg
1. leg (11 Mar)	SS2	Ortega — La Esperanza 1	29.06 km	(Finland) Marcus Grönholm	Peugeot 307 WRC	17:00.0	(Norway) Petter Solberg
1. leg (11 Mar)	SS3	Santana — Cubilete 1	21.80 km	(Estonia) Markko Märtin	Peugeot 307 WRC	11:47.7	(Norway) Petter Solberg
1. leg (11 Mar)	SS4	Ibarrilla — El Zauco 2	22.56 km	(Norway) Petter Solberg	Subaru Impreza S11 WRC '05	13:11.2	(Norway) Petter Solberg
1. leg (11 Mar)	SS5	Ortega — La Esperanza 2	29.06 km	(Norway) Petter Solberg	Subaru Impreza S11 WRC '05	16:33.7	(Norway) Petter Solberg
1. leg (11 Mar)	SS6	Santana — Cubilete 2	21.80 km	(Finland) Marcus Grönholm	Peugeot 307 WRC	11:44.6	(Norway) Petter Solberg
2. leg (12 Mar)	SS7	El Zauco — Mesa 1	25.45 km	(France) Sébastien Loeb	Citroën Xsara WRC	16:43.5	(Norway) Petter Solberg
2. leg (12 Mar)	SS8	Duarte — Otates 1	24.23 km	(Finland) Marcus Grönholm	Peugeot 307 WRC	18:11.5	(Norway) Petter Solberg
2. leg (12 Mar)	SS9	Derramadero — Chichimequillas 1	23.56 km	(Norway) Petter Solberg	Subaru Impreza S11 WRC '05	14:03.1	(Norway) Petter Solberg
2. leg (12 Mar)	SS10	El Zauco — Mesa 2	25.45 km	(Norway) Petter Solberg	Subaru Impreza S11 WRC '05	16:28.5	(Norway) Petter Solberg
2. leg (12 Mar)	SS11	Duarte — Otates 2	24.23 km	(Norway) Petter Solberg	Subaru Impreza S11 WRC '05	18:00.0	(Norway) Petter Solberg
2. leg (12 Mar)	SS12	Derramadero — Chichimequillas 2	23.56 km	(France) Sébastien Loeb	Citroën Xsara WRC	13:49.9	(Norway) Petter Solberg
3. leg (13 Mar)	SS13	Comanjilla — Chichimequillas	18.26 km	(France) Sébastien Loeb	Citroën Xsara WRC	10:08.8	(Norway) Petter Solberg
3. leg (13 Mar)	SS14	Alfaro — El Establo	44.39 km	(France) Sébastien Loeb	Citroën Xsara WRC	28:29.1	(Norway) Petter Solberg

==== Championship standings ====
Pos.	Drivers' championships			Co-drivers' championships			Manufacturers' championships		
Pos.	Move	Driver	Points	Move	Co-driver	Points	Move	Manufacturer	Points
1	3	(Norway) Petter Solberg	20	3	(United Kingdom) Phil Mills	20	1	(France) Marlboro Peugeot Total	31
2		(Estonia) Markko Märtin	19		(United Kingdom) Michael Park	19	1	(United Kingdom) BP Ford World Rally Team	23
3	2	(Finland) Toni Gardemeister	17	2	(Finland) Jakke Honkanen	17		(Japan) Mitsubishi Motors	23
4	1	(France) Sébastien Loeb	15	1	(Monaco) Daniel Elena	15	1	(Japan) Subaru World Rally Team	20
5	2	(Finland) Marcus Grönholm	12	2	(Finland) Timo Rautiainen	12	1	(France) Citroën Total WRT	16

=== Junior World Rally Championship ===
==== Classification ====
Position		No.	Driver	Co-driver	Entrant	Car	Time	Difference	Points
Event	Class	No.	Driver	Co-driver	Entrant	Car	Time	Difference	Points
11	1	32	(United Kingdom) Guy Wilks	(United Kingdom) Phil Pugh	(United Kingdom) Guy Wilks	Suzuki Ignis S1600	4:03:00.1		10
14	2	31	(Sweden) Per-Gunnar Andersson	(Sweden) Jonas Andersson	(Sweden) Per-Gunnar Andersson	Suzuki Ignis S1600	4:12:04.4	+9:04.3	8
17	3	39	(Italy) Luca Cecchettini	(Italy) Massimo Daddoveri	(Italy) Luca Cecchettini	Fiat Punto S1600	4:30:12.1	+27:12.0	6
19	4	42	(Czech Republic) Pavel Valoušek	(Italy) Pierangelo Scalvini	(Czech Republic) Pavel Valoušek	Suzuki Ignis S1600	4:39:22.1	+36:22.0	5
Retired SS9		40	(Zimbabwe) Conrad Rautenbach	(United Kingdom) Carl Williamson	(Zimbabwe) Conrad Rautenbach	Citroën Saxo S1600	Engine		0

==== Special stages ====
Day	Stage	Stage name	Length	Winner	Car	Time	Class leaders
1. leg (11 Mar)	SS1	Ibarrilla — El Zauco 1	22.56 km	(United Kingdom) Guy Wilks	Suzuki Ignis S1600	14:38.9	(United Kingdom) Guy Wilks
1. leg (11 Mar)	SS2	Ortega — La Esperanza 1	29.06 km	(United Kingdom) Guy Wilks	Suzuki Ignis S1600	18:05.2	(United Kingdom) Guy Wilks
1. leg (11 Mar)	SS3	Santana — Cubilete 1	21.80 km	(Sweden) Per-Gunnar Andersson	Suzuki Ignis S1600	12:51.0	(United Kingdom) Guy Wilks
1. leg (11 Mar)	SS4	Ibarrilla — El Zauco 2	22.56 km	(United Kingdom) Guy Wilks	Suzuki Ignis S1600	14:35.2	(United Kingdom) Guy Wilks
1. leg (11 Mar)	SS5	Ortega — La Esperanza 2	29.06 km	(United Kingdom) Guy Wilks	Suzuki Ignis S1600	17:47.2	(United Kingdom) Guy Wilks
1. leg (11 Mar)	SS6	Santana — Cubilete 2	21.80 km	(United Kingdom) Guy Wilks	Suzuki Ignis S1600	12:41.7	(United Kingdom) Guy Wilks
2. leg (12 Mar)	SS7	El Zauco — Mesa 1	25.45 km	(Sweden) Per-Gunnar Andersson	Suzuki Ignis S1600	18:17.5	(United Kingdom) Guy Wilks
2. leg (12 Mar)	SS8	Duarte — Otates 1	24.23 km	(United Kingdom) Guy Wilks	Suzuki Ignis S1600	19:36.1	(United Kingdom) Guy Wilks
2. leg (12 Mar)	SS9	Derramadero — Chichimequillas 1	23.56 km	(United Kingdom) Guy Wilks	Suzuki Ignis S1600	15:24.0	(United Kingdom) Guy Wilks
2. leg (12 Mar)	SS10	El Zauco — Mesa 2	25.45 km	(Sweden) Per-Gunnar Andersson	Suzuki Ignis S1600	18:05.7	(United Kingdom) Guy Wilks
2. leg (12 Mar)	SS11	Duarte — Otates 2	24.23 km	(United Kingdom) Guy Wilks	Suzuki Ignis S1600	19:20.6	(United Kingdom) Guy Wilks
2. leg (12 Mar)	SS12	Derramadero — Chichimequillas 2	23.56 km	(United Kingdom) Guy Wilks	Suzuki Ignis S1600	15:15.9	(United Kingdom) Guy Wilks
3. leg (13 Mar)	SS13	Comanjilla — Chichimequillas	18.26 km	(United Kingdom) Guy Wilks	Suzuki Ignis S1600	11:28.5	(United Kingdom) Guy Wilks
3. leg (13 Mar)	SS14	Alfaro — El Establo	44.39 km	(United Kingdom) Guy Wilks	Suzuki Ignis S1600	32:05.2	(United Kingdom) Guy Wilks

==== Championship standings ====
Pos.	Drivers' championships		
Pos.	Move	Driver	Points
1	6	(United Kingdom) Guy Wilks	12
2	4	(Sweden) Per-Gunnar Andersson	11
3	2	(United Kingdom) Kris Meeke	10
4	2	(Finland) Kosti Katajamäki	8
5	2	(Italy) Alan Scorcioni	6
