= 2002 Safari Rally =

8th round of the 2002 World Rally Championship

2002 Safari Rally 50th Inmarsat Safari Rally
Round 8 of the 2002 World Rally Championship season
← Previous event	Next event →
- Host country: Kenya
- Rally base: Nairobi
- Dates run: July 12, 2002 – July 14, 2002
- Stages: 12 (1,010.80 km; 628.08 miles)
- Stage surface: Gravel
- Overall distance: 2,357.12 km (1,464.65 miles)

Statistics
- Crews: 48 at start, 11 at finish

Overall results
- Overall winner: (United Kingdom) Colin McRae (United Kingdom) Nicky Grist (United Kingdom) Ford Motor Co. Ltd. Ford Focus RS WRC '02

The 2002 Safari Rally (formally the 50th Inmarsat Safari Rally) was the eighth round of the 2002 World Rally Championship. The race was held over three days between 12 July and 14 July 2002, and was won by Ford's Colin McRae, his 25th and final win in the World Rally Championship. The rally was the last 'endurance' Safari Rally to take place, with a competitive distance of around 1,010 kilometres (630 mi). Following financial difficulties, the Safari did not return to the World Championship until 2021.

== Background ==
=== Entry list ===
No.	Driver	Co-Driver	Entrant	Car	Tyre
World Rally Championship manufacturer entries
1	(United Kingdom) Richard Burns	(United Kingdom) Robert Reid	(France) Peugeot Total	Peugeot 206 WRC	MI
2	(Finland) Marcus Grönholm	(Finland) Timo Rautiainen	(France) Peugeot Total	Peugeot 206 WRC	MI
3	(Finland) Harri Rovanperä	(Finland) Risto Pietiläinen	(France) Peugeot Total	Peugeot 206 WRC	MI
4	(Spain) Carlos Sainz	(Spain) Luis Moya	(United Kingdom) Ford Motor Co. Ltd.	Ford Focus RS WRC '02	P
5	(United Kingdom) Colin McRae	(United Kingdom) Nicky Grist	(United Kingdom) Ford Motor Co. Ltd.	Ford Focus RS WRC '02	P
6	(Estonia) Markko Märtin	(United Kingdom) Michael Park	(United Kingdom) Ford Motor Co. Ltd.	Ford Focus RS WRC '02	P
7	(France) François Delecour	(France) Daniel Grataloup	(Japan) Marlboro Mitsubishi Ralliart	Mitsubishi Lancer WRC	MI
8	(United Kingdom) Alister McRae	(United Kingdom) David Senior	(Japan) Marlboro Mitsubishi Ralliart	Mitsubishi Lancer WRC	MI
10	(Finland) Tommi Mäkinen	(Finland) Kaj Lindström	(Japan) 555 Subaru World Rally Team	Subaru Impreza S7 WRC '01	P
11	(Norway) Petter Solberg	(United Kingdom) Phil Mills	(Japan) 555 Subaru World Rally Team	Subaru Impreza S8 WRC '02	P
14	(Sweden) Kenneth Eriksson	(Sweden) Tina Thörner	(Czech Republic) Škoda Motorsport	Škoda Octavia WRC Evo2	MI
15	(Finland) Toni Gardemeister	(Finland) Paavo Lukander	(Czech Republic) Škoda Motorsport	Škoda Octavia WRC Evo2	MI
16	(Czech Republic) Roman Kresta	(Czech Republic) Jan Tománek	(Czech Republic) Škoda Motorsport	Škoda Octavia WRC Evo2	MI
17	(Germany) Armin Schwarz	(Germany) Manfred Hiemer	(South Korea) Hyundai Castrol World Rally Team	Hyundai Accent WRC3	MI
18	(Belgium) Freddy Loix	(Belgium) Sven Smeets	(South Korea) Hyundai Castrol World Rally Team	Hyundai Accent WRC3	MI
19	(Finland) Juha Kankkunen	(Finland) Juha Repo	(South Korea) Hyundai Castrol World Rally Team	Hyundai Accent WRC3	MI
World Rally Championship entries
20	(Sweden) Thomas Rådström	(France) Denis Giraudet	(France) Automobiles Citroën	Citroën Xsara WRC	MI
21	(France) Sébastien Loeb	(Monaco) Daniel Elena	(France) Automobiles Citroën	Citroën Xsara WRC	MI
23	(France) Gilles Panizzi	(France) Hervé Panizzi	(France) Peugeot Total	Peugeot 206 WRC	MI
32	(France) Frédéric Dor	(France) Didier Breton	(France) Frédéric Dor	Subaru Impreza S8 WRC '02	MI
100	(Kenya) Rory Green	(Kenya) Orson Taylor	(Kenya) Rory Green	Subaru Impreza	—N/a
101	(Kenya) Shahnawaz Murji	(Kenya) Mohammed Verjee	(Kenya) Shahnawaz Murji	Subaru Impreza	—N/a
102	(United Kingdom) John Lloyd	(United Kingdom) Adrian Cavenagh	(United Kingdom) John Lloyd	Mitsubishi Lancer Evo IV	—N/a
103	(United Kingdom) Nigel Heath	(United Kingdom) Steve Lancaster	(United Kingdom) Nigel Heath	Subaru Impreza S5 WRC '99	—N/a
105	(Kenya) Rob Hellier	(United Kingdom) Des Page-Morris	(Kenya) Rob Hellier	Mitsubishi Lancer Evo III	—N/a
107	(Uganda) Charles Muhangi	(Uganda) Frank Nekusa	(Uganda) Charles Muhangi	Subaru Impreza	—N/a
112	(Kenya) Lee Rose	(Kenya) Piers Daykin	(Kenya) Lee Rose	Subaru Impreza	—N/a
114	(Kenya) Michelle van Tongeren	(Kenya) Anette Preston	(Kenya) Michelle van Tongeren	Subaru Impreza	—N/a
120	(Kenya) Carl Tundo	(Kenya) Tim Jessop	(Kenya) Carl Tundo	Subaru Impreza	—N/a
123	(Italy) Stefano Rocca	(Kenya) Peter Stone	(Italy) Stefano Rocca	Subaru Impreza	—N/a
PWRC entries
52	(Argentina) Marcos Ligato	(Argentina) Rubén García	(Italy) Top Run SRL	Mitsubishi Lancer Evo VI	—N/a
53	(Italy) Alessandro Fiorio	(Italy) Vittorio Brambilla	(Italy) Ralliart Italia	Mitsubishi Lancer Evo VI	—N/a
57	(Japan) Toshihiro Arai	(New Zealand) Tony Sircombe	(Japan) Spike Subaru Team	Subaru Impreza WRX	—N/a
71	(Italy) Stefano Marrini	(Italy) Tiziana Sandroni	(Italy) Top Run SRL	Mitsubishi Lancer Evo IV	—N/a
74	(Malaysia) Karamjit Singh	(Malaysia) Allen Oh	(Malaysia) Petronas EON Racing Team	Proton Pert	P

=== Itinerary ===
All dates and times are EAT (UTC+3).

Date	Time	No.	Stage name	Distance
Leg 1 — 336.78 km
12 July	08:23	SS1	Ngema — Kedong	73.63 km
12 July	10:32	SS2	Seyabei — Kerrerie 1	81.84 km
12 July	13:24	SS3	Nailongilok — Il Damat 1	74.75 km
12 July	15:27	SS4	Ntulele — Kedong 1	106.56 km
Leg 2 — 410.87 km
13 July	07:03	SS5	Kedong — Ngema 1	73.93 km
13 July	08:53	SS6	Il Damat — Nailongilok	74.75 km
13 July	11:01	SS7	Kedong — Ntulele	106.59 km
13 July	14:04	SS8	Kerrerie — Seyabei	81.67 km
13 July	16:18	SS9	Kedong — Ngema 2	73.93 km
Leg 3 — 263.15 km
14 July	07:08	SS10	Ntulele — Kedong 2	106.56 km
14 July	09:26	SS11	Nailongilok — Il Damat 2	74.75 km
14 July	11:59	SS12	Seyabei — Kerrerie 2	81.84 km

== Results ==
=== Overall ===
Pos.	No.	Driver	Co-driver	Team	Car	Time	Difference	Points
1	5	(United Kingdom) Colin McRae	(United Kingdom) Nicky Grist	(United Kingdom) Ford Motor Co. Ltd.	Ford Focus RS WRC '02	7:58:28.0		10
2	3	(Finland) Harri Rovanperä	(Finland) Risto Pietiläinen	(France) Peugeot Total	Peugeot 206 WRC	8:01:18.9	+2:50.9	6
3	20	(Sweden) Thomas Rådström	(France) Denis Giraudet	(France) Automobiles Citroën	Citroën Xsara WRC	8:17:06.6	+18:38.6	4
4	6	(Estonia) Markko Märtin	(United Kingdom) Michael Park	(United Kingdom) Ford Motor Co. Ltd.	Ford Focus RS WRC '02	8:19:56.0	+21:28.0	3
5	21	(France) Sébastien Loeb	(Monaco) Daniel Elena	(France) Automobiles Citroën	Citroën Xsara WRC	8:20:16.1	+21:48.1	2
6	23	(France) Gilles Panizzi	(France) Hervé Panizzi	(France) Peugeot Total	Peugeot 206 WRC	8:33:09.0	+34:41.0	1

=== World Rally Cars ===
==== Classification ====
Position		No.	Driver	Co-driver	Entrant	Car	Time	Difference	Points
Event	Class	No.	Driver	Co-driver	Entrant	Car	Time	Difference	Points
1	1	5	(United Kingdom) Colin McRae	(United Kingdom) Nicky Grist	(United Kingdom) Ford Motor Co. Ltd.	Ford Focus RS WRC '02	7:58:28.0		10
2	2	3	(Finland) Harri Rovanperä	(Finland) Risto Pietiläinen	(France) Peugeot Total	Peugeot 206 WRC	8:01:18.9	+2:50.9	6
4	3	6	(Estonia) Markko Märtin	(United Kingdom) Michael Park	(United Kingdom) Ford Motor Co. Ltd.	Ford Focus RS WRC '02	8:19:56.0	+21:28.0	3
7	4	16	(Czech Republic) Roman Kresta	(Czech Republic) Jan Tománek	(Czech Republic) Škoda Motorsport	Škoda Octavia WRC Evo2	8:53:06.1	+54:38.1	0
8	5	19	(Finland) Juha Kankkunen	(Finland) Juha Repo	(South Korea) Hyundai Castrol World Rally Team	Hyundai Accent WRC3	9:09:59.5	+1:11:31.5	0
9	6	8	(United Kingdom) Alister McRae	(United Kingdom) David Senior	(Japan) Marlboro Mitsubishi Ralliart	Mitsubishi Lancer WRC	9:15:41.2	+1:17:13.2	0
Retired SS9		1	(United Kingdom) Richard Burns	(United Kingdom) Robert Reid	(France) Peugeot Total	Peugeot 206 WRC	Lost wheel		0
Retired SS8		4	(Spain) Carlos Sainz	(Spain) Luis Moya	(United Kingdom) Ford Motor Co. Ltd.	Ford Focus RS WRC '02	Oil pump		0
Retired SS8		10	(Finland) Tommi Mäkinen	(Finland) Kaj Lindström	(Japan) 555 Subaru World Rally Team	Subaru Impreza S7 WRC '01	Suspension		0
Retired SS8		14	(Sweden) Kenneth Eriksson	(Sweden) Tina Thörner	(Czech Republic) Škoda Motorsport	Škoda Octavia WRC Evo2	Gearbox		0
Retired SS4		7	(France) François Delecour	(France) Daniel Grataloup	(Japan) Marlboro Mitsubishi Ralliart	Mitsubishi Lancer WRC	Engine		0
Retired SS4		11	(Norway) Petter Solberg	(United Kingdom) Phil Mills	(Japan) 555 Subaru World Rally Team	Subaru Impreza S8 WRC '02	Engine		0
Retired SS4		15	(Finland) Toni Gardemeister	(Finland) Paavo Lukander	(Czech Republic) Škoda Motorsport	Škoda Octavia WRC Evo2	Lost wheel		0
Retired SS2		17	(Germany) Armin Schwarz	(Germany) Manfred Hiemer	(South Korea) Hyundai Castrol World Rally Team	Hyundai Accent WRC3	Alternator		0
Retired SS1		2	(Finland) Marcus Grönholm	(Finland) Timo Rautiainen	(France) Peugeot Total	Peugeot 206 WRC	Engine		0
Retired SS1		18	(Belgium) Freddy Loix	(Belgium) Sven Smeets	(South Korea) Hyundai Castrol World Rally Team	Hyundai Accent WRC3	Clutch		0

==== Special stages ====
Day	Stage	Stage name	Length	Winner	Car	Time	Class leaders
Leg 1 (12 Jul)	SS1	Ngema — Kedong	73.63 km	(Finland) Tommi Mäkinen	Subaru Impreza S7 WRC '01	36:47.8	(Finland) Tommi Mäkinen
Leg 1 (12 Jul)	SS2	Seyabei — Kerrerie 1	81.84 km	(United Kingdom) Colin McRae	Ford Focus RS WRC '02	37:13.1	(Finland) Tommi Mäkinen
Leg 1 (12 Jul)	SS3	Nailongilok — Il Damat 1	74.75 km	(Finland) Tommi Mäkinen	Subaru Impreza S7 WRC '01	44:23.6	(Finland) Tommi Mäkinen
Leg 1 (12 Jul)	SS4	Ntulele — Kedong 1	106.56 km	(United Kingdom) Colin McRae	Ford Focus RS WRC '02	51:00.2	(Finland) Tommi Mäkinen
Leg 2 (13 Jul)	SS5	Kedong — Ngema 1	73.93 km	(France) Sébastien Loeb	Citroën Xsara WRC	37:30.6	(United Kingdom) Colin McRae
Leg 2 (13 Jul)	SS6	Il Damat — Nailongilok	74.75 km	Stage cancelled			(United Kingdom) Colin McRae
Leg 2 (13 Jul)	SS7	Kedong — Ntulele	106.59 km	(United Kingdom) Richard Burns	Peugeot 206 WRC	51:11.1	(United Kingdom) Colin McRae
Leg 2 (13 Jul)	SS8	Kerrerie — Seyabei	81.67 km	(France) Gilles Panizzi	Peugeot 206 WRC	37:22.4	(United Kingdom) Colin McRae
Leg 2 (13 Jul)	SS9	Kedong — Ngema 2	73.93 km	(France) Sébastien Loeb	Citroën Xsara WRC	36:36.6	(United Kingdom) Colin McRae
Leg 3 (14 Jul)	SS10	Ntulele — Kedong 2	106.56 km	(United Kingdom) Colin McRae	Ford Focus RS WRC '02	51:32.1	(United Kingdom) Colin McRae
Leg 3 (14 Jul)	SS11	Nailongilok — Il Damat 2	74.75 km	(France) Gilles Panizzi	Peugeot 206 WRC	45:26.6	(United Kingdom) Colin McRae
Leg 3 (14 Jul)	SS12	Seyabei — Kerrerie 2	81.84 km	(France) Sébastien Loeb	Citroën Xsara WRC	36:35.1	(United Kingdom) Colin McRae

==== Championship standings ====
Pos.	Drivers' championships			Co-drivers' championships			Manufacturers' championships		
Pos.	Move	Driver	Points	Move	Co-driver	Points	Move	Manufacturer	Points
1		(Finland) Marcus Grönholm	37		(Finland) Timo Rautiainen	37		(France) Peugeot Total	83
2	2	(United Kingdom) Colin McRae	30	2	(United Kingdom) Nicky Grist	30		(United Kingdom) Ford Motor Co. Ltd.	69
3	1	(Spain) Carlos Sainz	23	1	(Spain) Luis Moya	23		(Japan) 555 Subaru World Rally Team	35
4	1	(France) Gilles Panizzi	21	1	(France) Hervé Panizzi	21	1	(Czech Republic) Škoda Motorsport	8
5		(United Kingdom) Richard Burns	19		(United Kingdom) Robert Reid	19	1	(Japan) Marlboro Mitsubishi Ralliart	7

=== Production World Rally Championship ===
==== Classification ====
Position		No.	Driver	Co-driver	Entrant	Car	Time	Difference	Points
Event	Class	No.	Driver	Co-driver	Entrant	Car	Time	Difference	Points
10	1	74	(Malaysia) Karamjit Singh	(Malaysia) Allen Oh	(Malaysia) Petronas EON Racing Team	Proton Pert	10:27:55.2		10
Retired SS12		52	(Argentina) Marcos Ligato	(Argentina) Rubén García	(Italy) Top Run SRL	Mitsubishi Lancer Evo VI	Suspension		0
Retired SS11		57	(Japan) Toshihiro Arai	(New Zealand) Tony Sircombe	(Japan) Spike Subaru Team	Subaru Impreza WRX	Clutch		0
Retired SS8		71	(Italy) Stefano Marrini	(Italy) Tiziana Sandroni	(Italy) Top Run SRL	Mitsubishi Lancer Evo IV	Suspension		0
Retired SS3		53	(Italy) Alessandro Fiorio	(Italy) Vittorio Brambilla	(Italy) Ralliart Italia	Mitsubishi Lancer Evo VI	Suspension		0

==== Special stages ====
Day	Stage	Stage name	Length	Winner	Car	Time	Class leaders
Leg 1 (12 Jul)	SS1	Ngema — Kedong	73.63 km	(Argentina) Marcos Ligato	Mitsubishi Lancer Evo VI	50:41.1	(Argentina) Marcos Ligato
Leg 1 (12 Jul)	SS2	Seyabei — Kerrerie 1	81.84 km	(Argentina) Marcos Ligato	Mitsubishi Lancer Evo VI	47:32.0	(Argentina) Marcos Ligato
Leg 1 (12 Jul)	SS3	Nailongilok — Il Damat 1	74.75 km	(Malaysia) Karamjit Singh	Proton Pert	1:00:37.2	(Malaysia) Karamjit Singh
Leg 1 (12 Jul)	SS4	Ntulele — Kedong 1	106.56 km	(Argentina) Marcos Ligato	Mitsubishi Lancer Evo VI	1:02:57.9	(Argentina) Marcos Ligato
Leg 2 (13 Jul)	SS5	Kedong — Ngema 1	73.93 km	(Japan) Toshihiro Arai	Subaru Impreza WRX	50:19.4	(Argentina) Marcos Ligato
Leg 2 (13 Jul)	SS6	Il Damat — Nailongilok	74.75 km	Stage cancelled			(Argentina) Marcos Ligato
Leg 2 (13 Jul)	SS7	Kedong — Ntulele	106.59 km	(Japan) Toshihiro Arai	Subaru Impreza WRX	1:05:58.0	(Argentina) Marcos Ligato
Leg 2 (13 Jul)	SS8	Kerrerie — Seyabei	81.67 km	(Malaysia) Karamjit Singh	Proton Pert	46:43.5	(Argentina) Marcos Ligato
Leg 2 (13 Jul)	SS9	Kedong — Ngema 2	73.93 km	(Argentina) Marcos Ligato	Mitsubishi Lancer Evo VI	46:31.2	(Argentina) Marcos Ligato
Leg 3 (14 Jul)	SS10	Ntulele — Kedong 2	106.56 km	(Japan) Toshihiro Arai	Subaru Impreza WRX	59:53.0	(Argentina) Marcos Ligato
Leg 3 (14 Jul)	SS11	Nailongilok — Il Damat 2	74.75 km	(Malaysia) Karamjit Singh	Proton Pert	1:03:50.3	(Malaysia) Karamjit Singh
Leg 3 (14 Jul)	SS12	Seyabei — Kerrerie 2	81.84 km	(Malaysia) Karamjit Singh	Proton Pert	45:15.9	(Malaysia) Karamjit Singh

==== Championship standings ====
Pos.	Drivers' championships		
Pos.	Move	Driver	Points
1	1	(Malaysia) Karamjit Singh	24
2	1	(Peru) Ramón Ferreyros	20
3		(Japan) Toshihiro Arai	12
4		(Uruguay) Gustavo Trelles	12
5		(Finland) Kristian Sohlberg	10
