= Markko Märtin =

Estonian rally driver (born 1975)

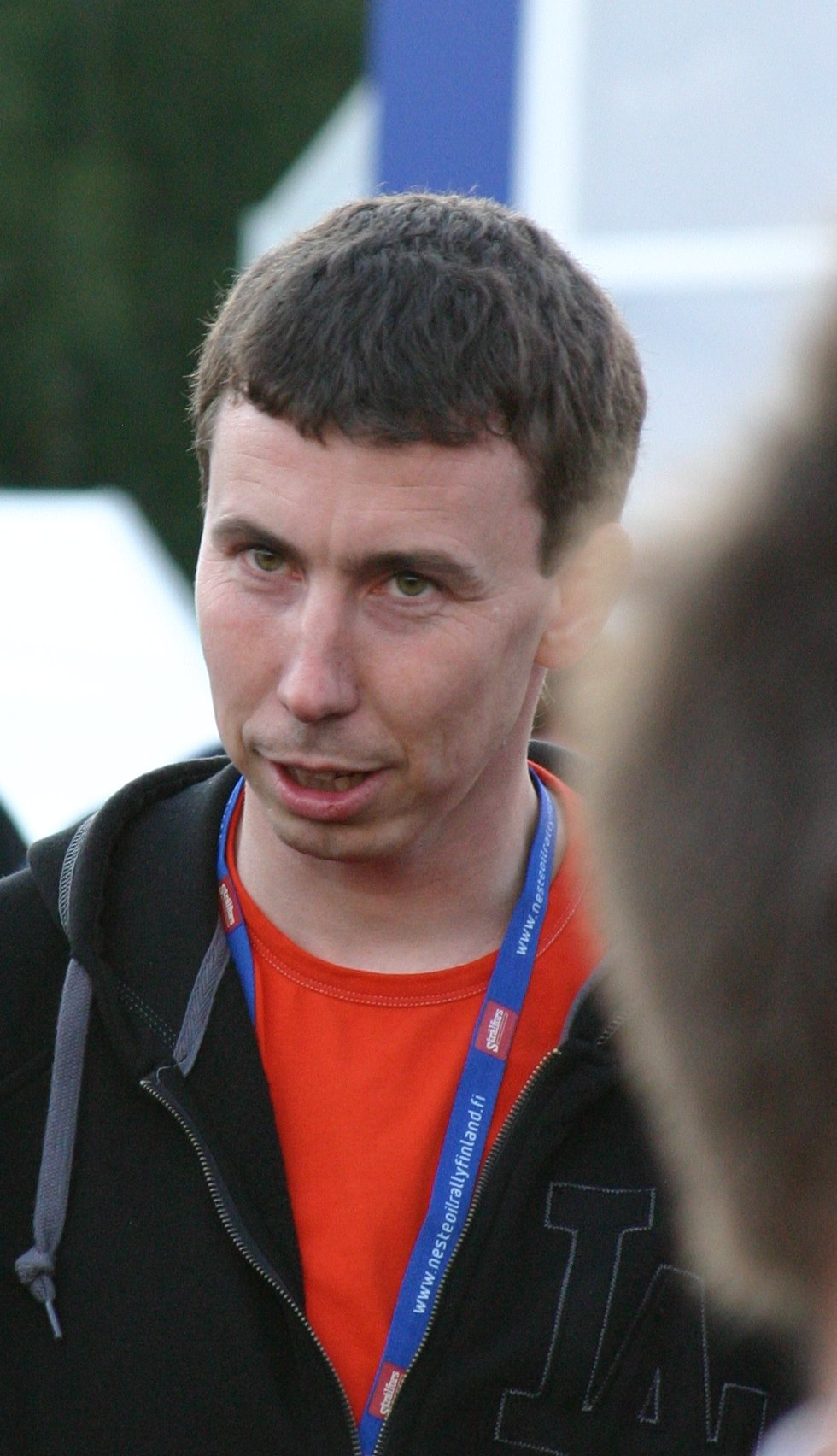
- Märtin in 2006

Personal information
- Nationality: (Estonia) Estonian
- Born: 10 November 1975 (age 51); Tartu, then part of Estonian SSR, Soviet Union

World Rally Championship record
- Years active: 1997–2005
- Co-driver: (Estonia) Toomas Kitsing (United Kingdom) Michael Park
- Teams: Lukoil EOS Rally Team, Subaru World Rally Team, Ford, Peugeot
- Rallies: 86
- Championships: 0
- Rally wins: 5
- Podiums: 18
- Stage wins: 101
- Total points: 207
- First rally: 1997 Rally Finland
- First win: 2003 Acropolis Rally
- Last win: 2004 Rally Catalunya
- Last rally: 2005 Wales Rally GB

Markko Märtin (born 10 November 1975) is an Estonian retired rally driver who competed in the World Rally Championship from 2000 until 2005.

== Career ==
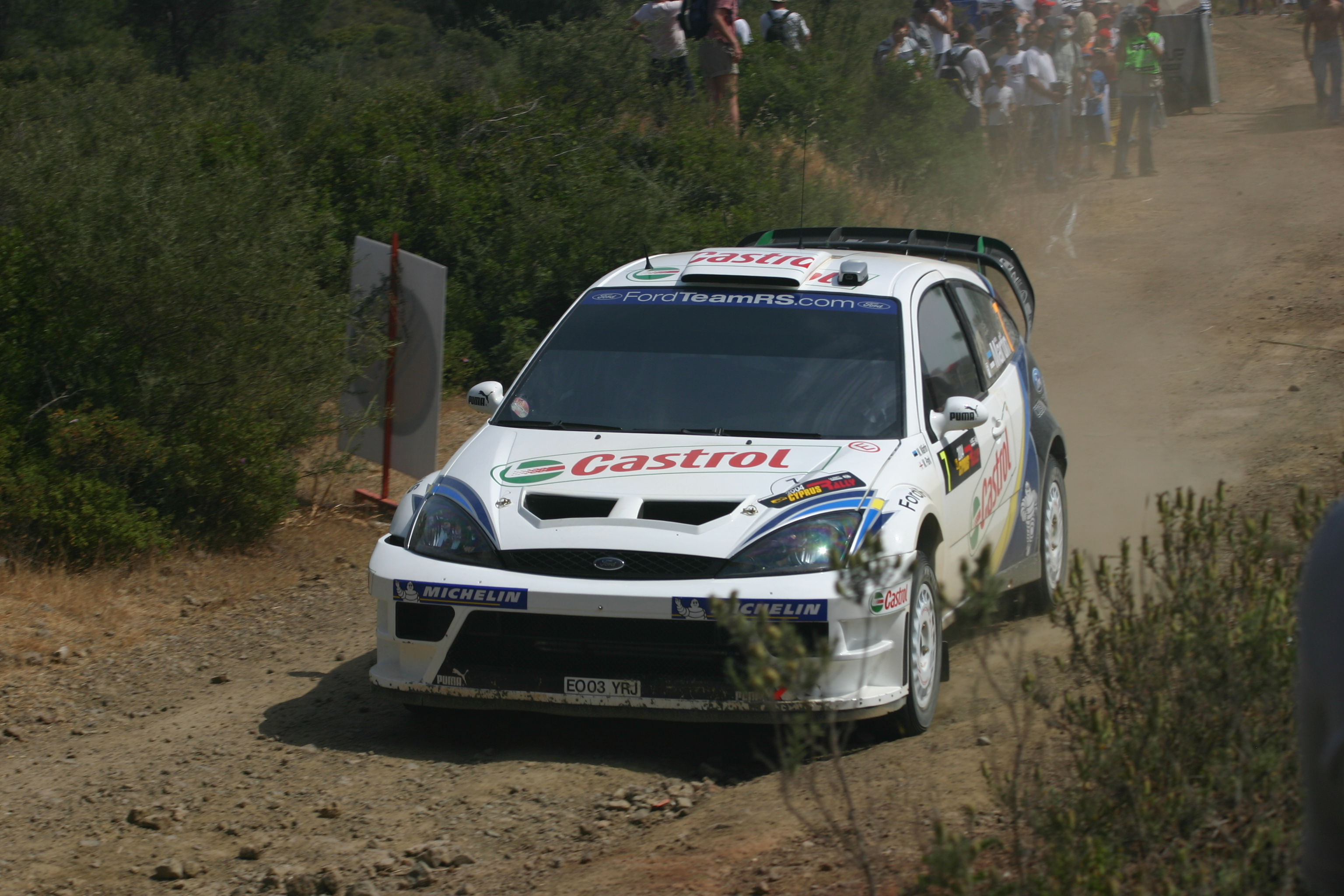
Märtin with a Ford Focus RS WRC 04 at the 2004 Cyprus Rally.

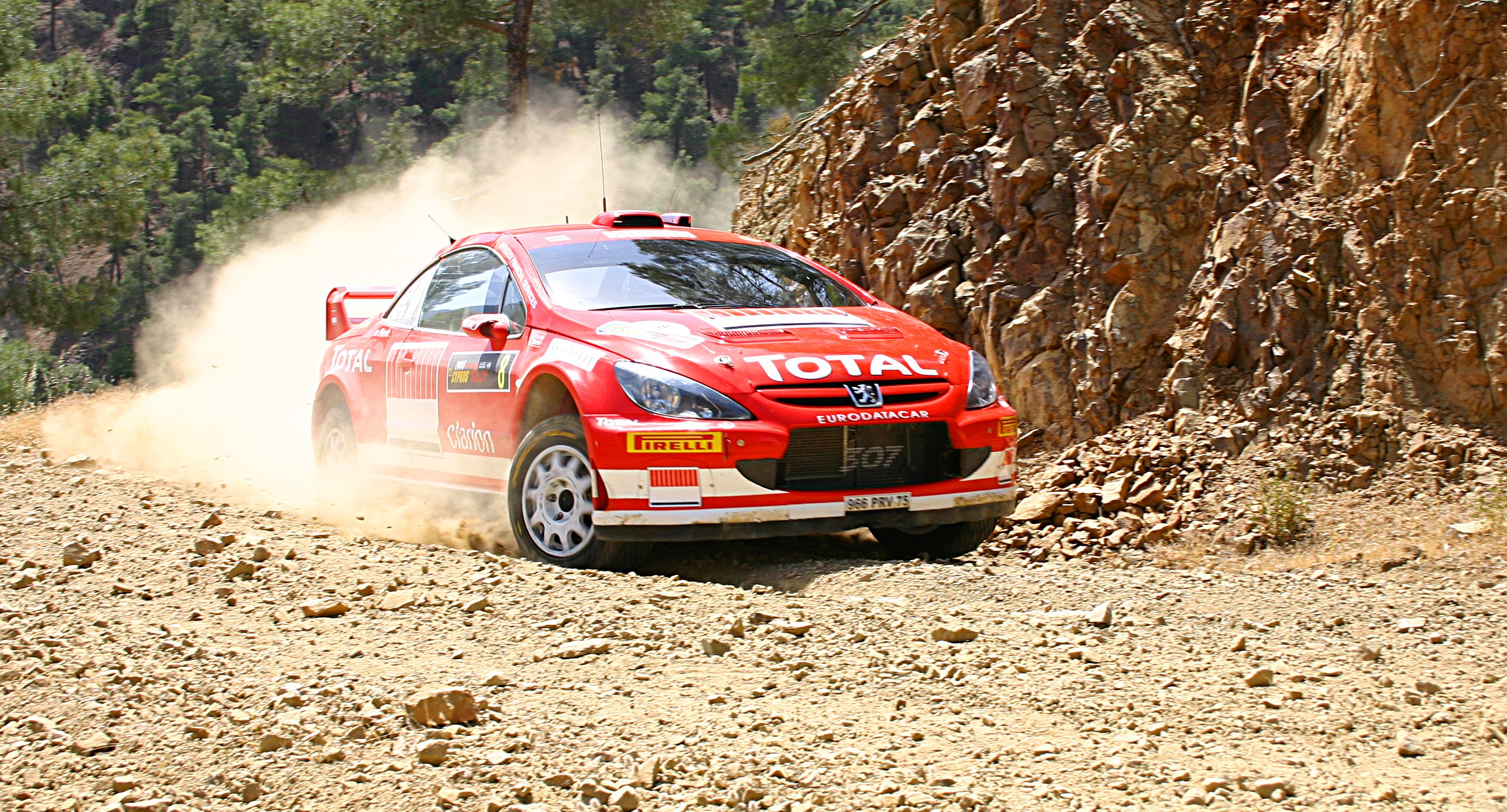
Märtin with a Peugeot 307 WRC at the 2005 Cyprus Rally.

Märtin, as understudy to then-team mates Colin McRae and Carlos Sainz, rose to prominence with the Ford World Rally Team in the 2002 season. He was leading that year's Acropolis Rally Greece until he suffered two punctures and fell behind the more experienced McRae. He won the equivalent event in Greece the following year as well as being only the third driver in the history of the WRC to break the Nordic stranglehold on the Neste Rally Finland. In addition to this, Märtin was inaugural winner, again with Ford, of the Corona Rally Mexico in the 2004 season. He also won the tarmac rallies of Corsica and Catalunya in the same year. These victories were the last for the Märtin/Michael Park partnership.

For 2005, Märtin departed the team for former constructors' champion Peugeot and its 307 car. He and co-driver Park had still notched up four podium finishes for their new employers by the time they had arrived in Wales to contest the Wales Rally Great Britain. On the final leg of the event, two kilometres from the start of Stage 15 at Margam Park, Märtin's Peugeot crashed into a tree. Although the Estonian driver was left unhurt by the crash, co-driver Michael Park was immediately killed in the accident, the first fatality for a competitor at WRC-level for over a decade. As a result, Märtin announced that he would pull out of the last four events of the 2005 season.

Shaken by the death of Park, Märtin effectively left the WRC stage. He went on to manage a junior rallying team in the Estonian rally scene, indicating that he would likely refuse any offers to drive at the top level again. He has since spoken out against the FIA's treatment of the WRC, claiming that the series had lost much of its lustre and calling for a far-reaching rules overhaul.

However, Märtin made a limited return to competitive rallying in March 2006 at the 2006 Rally of Portugal. The invitational event was held as a candidate for full WRC status. Märtin competed in a Subaru Impreza, his first outing in an FIA-spec Group N car in nearly a decade. He was co-driven by David Senior, who formerly worked with Alister McRae. Märtin also partook in the 2006 Danish Touring Car Championship with Hans Hartmann's Honda Racing.

Märtin signed a deal to become the official test driver for the Subaru World Rally Team in 2008. He has since test-driven for Ford and Mini.

== Life after WRC ==
In 2009, Märtin was hired by Ford to work as a R&D factory driver. He helped to train WRC rookie Ken Block for the 2010 WRC season. On 7 June 2010, it was announced that Märtin would race in Rally Estonia, which took place on 16–18 July 2010 and which was also an IRC candidate event. Märtin drove a Ford Focus RS WRC 03, which he referred to as "the best rally car in the world." Märtin won all twelve stages, second place, Ott Tänak lost 2.50,3.

Together with his father, Märtin runs a haulage company in Estonia. He also rents out land and property, most prominently a piece of land to Autospirit, an Estonian car dealership. In 2005 he also created MM Motorsport, which won several Estonian Rally Championship titles. The team also has numerous Ford Fiesta R5 for rent.

== Personal life ==
Märtin lives in Monaco with Miss Model Estonia 2004 Mari-Liis Sallo and they welcomed their first child together in summer 2007.

Märtin also appeared in the 2019 documentary film Ott Tänak: The Movie and in the 2023 film Legends of the Winding Roads as one of the interviewees.

Märtin was a good friend of Richard Burns and was in the car at the time when Burns collapsed at the wheel on a UK motorway; Märtin managed to steer the car to the hard shoulder to avoid any incident. Burns's collapse was a result of an aggressive brain tumour that eventually led to his death.

== Complete World Rally Championship results ==
(key)

Year	Entrant	Chassis	1	2	3	4	5	6	7	8	9	10	11	12	13	14	15	16	WDC	Points
1997	Markko Märtin	Toyota Celica GT-Four ST185	MON	SWE	KEN	POR	ESP	FRA	ARG	GRC	NZL	FIN; Ret	IDN	ITA	AUS	GBR			NC	0
1998	Markko Märtin	Toyota Celica GT-Four ST205	MON	SWE	KEN	POR; Ret	ESP	FRA	ARG	GRC	NZL	FIN; 12	ITA; 9	AUS	GBR; Ret				NC	0
1999	Markko Märtin	Ford Escort WRC	MON	SWE; 8	KEN	POR; Ret													18th	2
1999	Markko Märtin	Toyota Corolla WRC AE111					ESP	FRA	ARG	GRC; 5	NZL	FIN; Ret	CHN	ITA; Ret	AUS	GBR; 8			18th	2
2000	Lukoil EOS Rally Team	Toyota Corolla WRC AE111	MON	SWE; 9	KEN	POR; 7	ESP; 10	ARG	GRC; Ret	NZL	FIN; 10	CYP; 6	FRA	ITA; Ret		GBR; 7			21st	1
2000	Subaru World Rally Team	Subaru Impreza WRC2000													AUS; Ret				21st	1
2001	Subaru World Rally Team	Subaru Impreza WRC2001	MON; Ret	SWE; 12	POR; Ret	ESP; Ret	ARG	CYP	GRC; Ret	KEN	FIN; 5	NZL	ITA; Ret	FRA; 6	AUS	GBR; Ret			19th	3
2002	Ford Motor Co	Ford Focus RS WRC 02	MON; 12	SWE; DNS	FRA; 8	ESP; 8	CYP; 8	ARG; 4	GRC; 6	KEN; 4	FIN; 5	GER; 6	ITA; 5	NZL; Ret	AUS; 5	GBR; 2			9th	20
2003	Ford Motor Co	Ford Focus RS WRC 02	MON; 4	SWE; 4	TUR; 6														5th	49
2003	Ford Motor Co	Ford Focus RS WRC 03				NZL; Ret	ARG; Ret	GRC; 1	CYP; Ret	GER; 5	FIN; 1	AUS; DSQ	ITA; 3	FRA; Ret	ESP; 3	GBR; Ret			5th	49
2004	Ford Motor Co	Ford Focus RS WRC 03	MON; 2	SWE; 7	MEX; 1														3rd	79
2004	Ford Motor Co	Ford Focus RS WRC 04				NZL; 3	CYP; 2	GRC; Ret	TUR; 24	ARG; Ret	FIN; 2	GER; 4	JPN; 3	GBR; 3	ITA; Ret	FRA; 1	ESP; 1	AUS; Ret	3rd	79
2005	Peugeot	Peugeot 307 WRC	MON; 4	SWE; 2	MEX; 3	NZL; 5	ITA; 4	CYP; 3	TUR; 5	GRC; 8	ARG; 6	FIN; 3	GER; 4	GBR; Ret	JPN	FRA	ESP	AUS	5th	53

== WRC victories ==
Number	Event	Season	Co-driver	Car
1	50 th BP Ultimate Acropolis Rally of Greece	2003	Michael Park	Ford Focus RS WRC 03
2	53rd Neste Rally Finland	2003	Michael Park	Ford Focus RS WRC 03
3	(Mexico) 18º Corona Rally México	2004	Michael Park	Ford Focus RS WRC 03
4	48ème Tour de Corse – Rallye de France	2004	Michael Park	Ford Focus RS WRC 04
5	(Spain) 40º Rallye Catalunya-Costa Brava (Rallye de España)	2004	Michael Park	Ford Focus RS WRC 04
