= Ford Focus RS WRC =

Series of rally cars by Ford

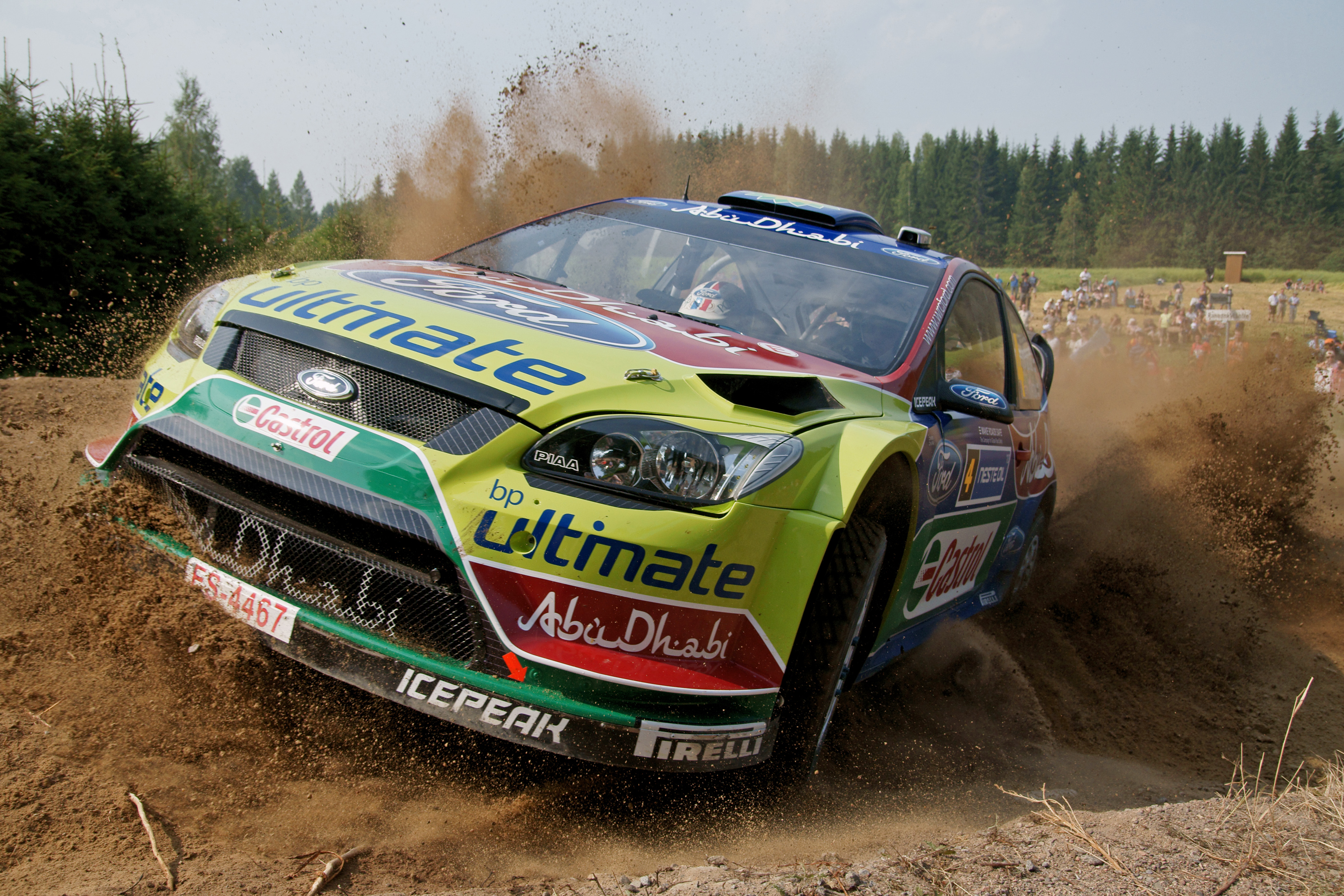
- Jari-Matti Latvala, winner of the 2010 Rally Finland, driving a Ford Focus RS WRC 09 in Muurame, Finland.
- Category: World Rally Car
- Constructor: Ford (M-Sport)
- Designer: Guenther Steiner
- Predecessor: Ford Escort WRC
- Successor: Ford Fiesta RS WRC

Technical specifications
- Engine: Ford Duratec 2.0 L (122 cu in) I4 turbocharged front-engine, all-wheel-drive
- Lubricants: Various
- Tyres: Pirelli

Competition history (WRC)
- Notable entrants: (United Kingdom) Ford
- Debut: (Monaco) 1999 Monte Carlo Rally
- First win: (Kenya) 1999 Safari Rally
- Last win: 2010 Rally Finland
- Last event: (United Kingdom) 2010 Wales Rally GB
Races	Wins	Podiums	Titles
173	44	142	2
- Constructors' Championships: 2 (2006, 2007)
- Drivers' Championships: 0

The Ford Focus RS WRC is a car built for the Ford World Rally Team by Ford Europe and M-Sport and based on the Ford Focus Climate 2-litre production hatchback, developed to compete in the World Rally Championship. The RS stands for Rally Sport and the WRC for World Rally Car, the car's FIA specification. The Focus RS WRC was in competition from 1999 to 2010, winning 44 world rallies and two manufacturers' world titles (2006 and 2007). It was replaced by the Ford Fiesta RS WRC.

Like all contemporary World Rally Cars, the car is heavily modified from the production version, with which it shares only the basic shape and some parts of the bodyshell. The car features four-wheel drive, rather than the front-wheel drive of the road car. The engine used in the 2007 Focus WRC is based on Ford's 2.0 Litre Duratec from other models in the Focus range as rallying rules do not permit the standard 2.5-litre engine of the Focus ST or road going RS. As with most rally cars, the 2.0-litre engine is heavily modified and performance was increased using a turbocharger. The 2009 Ford Focus RS WRC uses a Ford 1998cc Pipo built I4 Duratec WRC engine (four cylinders, 16 valves, bore 85 mm and stroke 88 mm), Pi electronic engine management system, Garrett turbocharger (with required 34 mm inlet restrictor), air intercooler, and a catalytic converter.

The car's transmission is a permanent four-wheel drive with an M-Sport designed active centre differential, Pi electronic differential control units, M-Sport/Ricardo five-speed sequential gearbox with electro-hydraulically controlled shift and an M-Sport/Sachs multi-disc carbon clutch.

== History ==
2010 Ford Focus RS WRC pulling away on tarmac

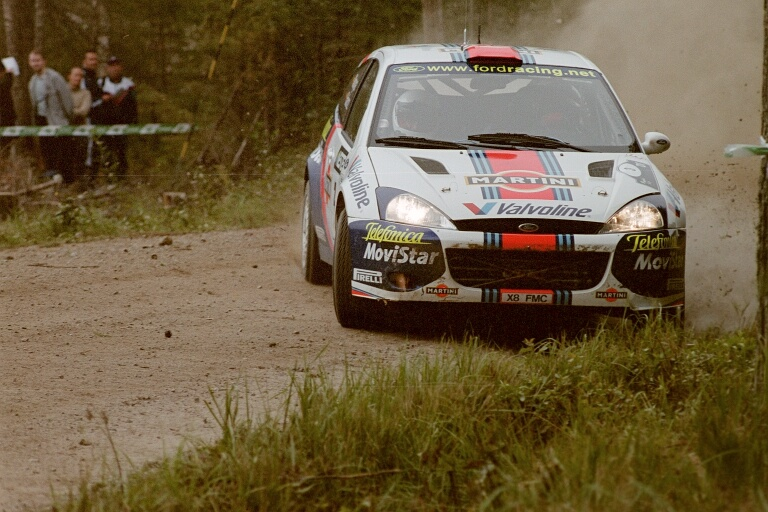
Carlos Sainz driving an RS WRC 01 at the 2001 Rally Finland.

The first version of the car was built in 1999 to replace the Ford Escort WRC. It debuted in the Monte Carlo Rally with Colin McRae and Simon Jean-Joseph behind the wheels of the two cars. It was immediately on the pace, setting many fastest stage times, but the use of an illegal water pump meant that the two cars were excluded from the event. McRae gave the Focus its first win two events later on the Safari Rally Kenya finishing over 15 minutes ahead of the second placed Toyota of Didier Auriol. Despite coming close on several occasions, the car never won either the drivers or manufacturers title. This included McRae losing the 2001 title by 2 points after crashing out of the final round.

In 2003, Ford released a newly designed Focus RS WRC, named Focus RS WRC 03, for competition during the second part of the season. The car, with most parts redesigned from the ground up, featured a lighter body shell and a new aerodynamically enhanced front bumper and wing. Markko Märtin drove the car to two world rally victories. The 2004 and 2005 Focus RS WRCs were evolutions based on the RS WRC 03. The Focus RS WRC 04 won three events with Märtin at the wheel. By 2005, the car was no longer very competitive and Ford had a winless season.

From the last rally of the 2005 season, Ford campaigned a brand new model, the Focus RS WRC 06, following the launch of the new road-going version of the car. The engine chosen for this Focus was a Duratec motor developed by the French engine specialist Pipo Moteur. In the hands of Marcus Grönholm and Mikko Hirvonen, the car took eight world rally wins in the 2006 season, winning the first manufacturers' championship for Ford since 1979.

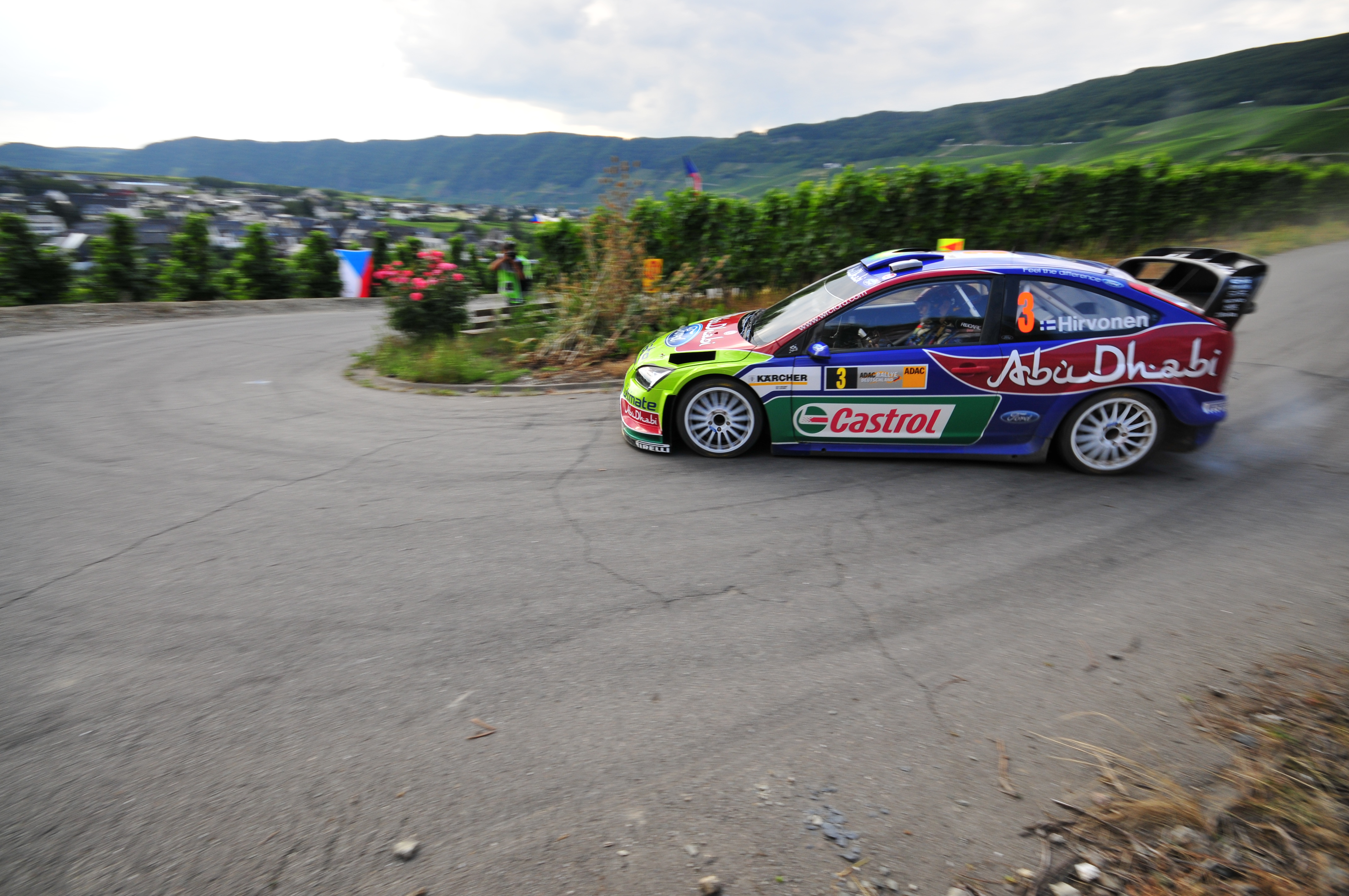
Mikko Hirvonen driving an RS WRC 08 in Germany.

The Focus RS WRC 07 is based on the 2006 model, and according to Ford's technical director Christian Loriaux "the changes on the new car are mainly to save weight and to improve efficiency, driveability and performance at the bottom end of the range." The car debuted very successfully at the 2007 Rally Finland as Ford's Finns Grönholm and Mikko Hirvonen finished in first and second. Ford successfully defended the manufacturers' championship in 2007. The car later made history at the 2008 Swedish Rally when Jari-Matti Latvala used it to become the youngest-ever driver to win a world rally.

The Focus RS WRC 08 is based on the 2007 model. The Focus WRC 08 was in competition for the first time with its new front aero design at the 2008 Rallye Deutschland. The 2008 version of the Focus RS WRC includes design style changes as well as engine improvements. Style changes to the grille area reflect the looks of the recently previewed Focus RS Mk II road sport car. The 2008 RS WRC was driven to its only victory at the 2008 Rally Japan.

The 2009 version of the Focus RS WRC debuted at the 2009 Rally d'Italia Sardegna, leading Ford to a 1–2. It includes small design style changes. Style changes were made to the lights frame and rear bumper to bring the look closer to the Focus RS Mk II 2009 road sport car. The 2009 Focus RS WRC remained the last of Ford's WRC cars based on the Focus. It was replaced by the Ford Fiesta RS WRC after the 2010 season.

The Ford Focus RS WRC appeared in 173 World Rally Championship events, winning 44 and collecting 142 podium places.

== WRC Victories ==
No.	Event	Season	Driver	Co-driver
1	(Kenya) 1999 Safari Rally	1999	(United Kingdom) Colin McRae	(United Kingdom) Nicky Grist
2	1999 Rally de Portugal	1999	(United Kingdom) Colin McRae	(United Kingdom) Nicky Grist
3	(Spain) 2000 Rallye Catalunya	2000	(United Kingdom) Colin McRae	(United Kingdom) Nicky Grist
4	(Greece) 2000 Acropolis Rally	2000	(United Kingdom) Colin McRae	(United Kingdom) Nicky Grist
5	2000 Cyprus Rally	2000	(Spain) Carlos Sainz	(Spain) Luis Moya
6	2001 Rally Argentina	2001	(United Kingdom) Colin McRae	(United Kingdom) Nicky Grist
7	2001 Cyprus Rally	2001	(United Kingdom) Colin McRae	(United Kingdom) Nicky Grist
8	(Greece) 2001 Acropolis Rally	2001	(United Kingdom) Colin McRae	(United Kingdom) Nicky Grist
9	2002 Rally Argentina	2002	(Spain) Carlos Sainz	(Spain) Luis Moya
10	(Greece) 2002 Acropolis Rally	2002	(United Kingdom) Colin McRae	(United Kingdom) Nicky Grist
11	(Kenya) 2002 Safari Rally	2002	(United Kingdom) Colin McRae	(United Kingdom) Nicky Grist
12	(Greece) 2003 Acropolis Rally	2003	(Estonia) Markko Märtin	(United Kingdom) Michael Park
13	2003 Rally Finland	2003	(Estonia) Markko Märtin	(United Kingdom) Michael Park
14	(Mexico) 2004 Rally México	2004	(Estonia) Markko Märtin	(United Kingdom) Michael Park
15	(France) 2004 Tour de Corse	2004	(Estonia) Markko Märtin	(United Kingdom) Michael Park
16	(Spain) 2004 Rally Catalunya	2004	(Estonia) Markko Märtin	(United Kingdom) Michael Park
17	(Monaco) 2006 Monte Carlo Rally	2006	(Finland) Marcus Grönholm	(Finland) Timo Rautiainen
18	(Sweden) 2006 Swedish Rally	2006	(Finland) Marcus Grönholm	(Finland) Timo Rautiainen
19	(Greece) 2006 Acropolis Rally	2006	(Finland) Marcus Grönholm	(Finland) Timo Rautiainen
20	2006 Rally Finland	2006	(Finland) Marcus Grönholm	(Finland) Timo Rautiainen
21	2006 Rally of Turkey	2006	(Finland) Marcus Grönholm	(Finland) Timo Rautiainen
22	2006 Rally Australia	2006	(Finland) Mikko Hirvonen	(Finland) Jarmo Lehtinen
23	2006 Rally New Zealand	2006	(Finland) Marcus Grönholm	(Finland) Timo Rautiainen
24	(United Kingdom) 2006 Wales Rally GB	2006	(Finland) Marcus Grönholm	(Finland) Timo Rautiainen
25	(Sweden) 2007 Swedish Rally	2007	(Finland) Marcus Grönholm	(Finland) Timo Rautiainen
26	2007 Rally Norway	2007	(Finland) Mikko Hirvonen	(Finland) Jarmo Lehtinen
27	(Italy) 2007 Rally d'Italia Sardegna	2007	(Finland) Marcus Grönholm	(Finland) Timo Rautiainen
28	(Greece) 2007 Acropolis Rally	2007	(Finland) Marcus Grönholm	(Finland) Timo Rautiainen
29	2007 Rally Finland	2007	(Finland) Marcus Grönholm	(Finland) Timo Rautiainen
30	2007 Rally New Zealand	2007	(Finland) Marcus Grönholm	(Finland) Timo Rautiainen
31	2007 Rally Japan	2007	(Finland) Mikko Hirvonen	(Finland) Jarmo Lehtinen
32	(United Kingdom) 2007 Wales Rally GB	2007	(Finland) Mikko Hirvonen	(Finland) Jarmo Lehtinen
33	(Sweden) 2008 Swedish Rally	2008	(Finland) Jari-Matti Latvala	(Finland) Miikka Anttila
34	2008 Jordan Rally	2008	(Finland) Mikko Hirvonen	(Finland) Jarmo Lehtinen
35	2008 Rally of Turkey	2008	(Finland) Mikko Hirvonen	(Finland) Jarmo Lehtinen
36	2008 Rally Japan	2008	(Finland) Mikko Hirvonen	(Finland) Jarmo Lehtinen
37	(Italy) 2009 Rally d'Italia Sardegna	2009	(Finland) Jari-Matti Latvala	(Finland) Miikka Anttila
38	(Greece) 2009 Acropolis Rally	2009	(Finland) Mikko Hirvonen	(Finland) Jarmo Lehtinen
39	2009 Rally Poland	2009	(Finland) Mikko Hirvonen	(Finland) Jarmo Lehtinen
40	2009 Rally Finland	2009	(Finland) Mikko Hirvonen	(Finland) Jarmo Lehtinen
41	2009 Rally Australia	2009	(Finland) Mikko Hirvonen	(Finland) Jarmo Lehtinen
42	(Sweden) 2010 Swedish Rally	2010	(Finland) Mikko Hirvonen	(Finland) Jarmo Lehtinen
43	2010 Rally New Zealand	2010	(Finland) Jari-Matti Latvala	(Finland) Miikka Anttila
44	2010 Rally Finland	2010	(Finland) Jari-Matti Latvala	(Finland) Miikka Anttila

== Gallery ==
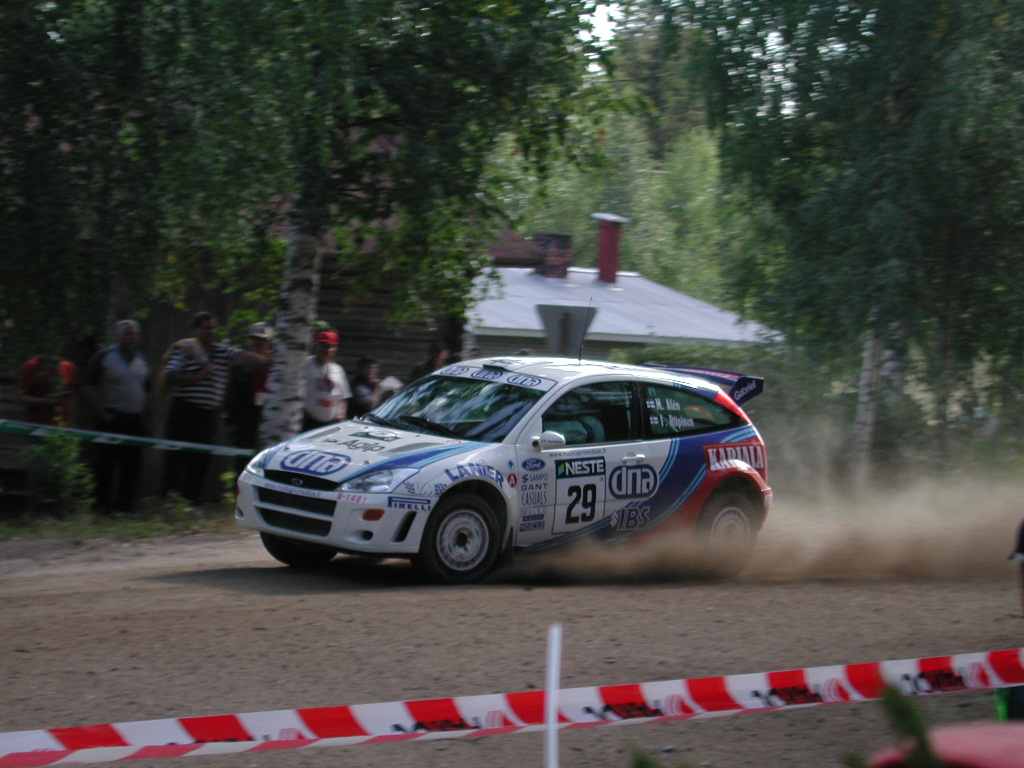
Focus WRC (1999) at the 2001 Rally Finland.

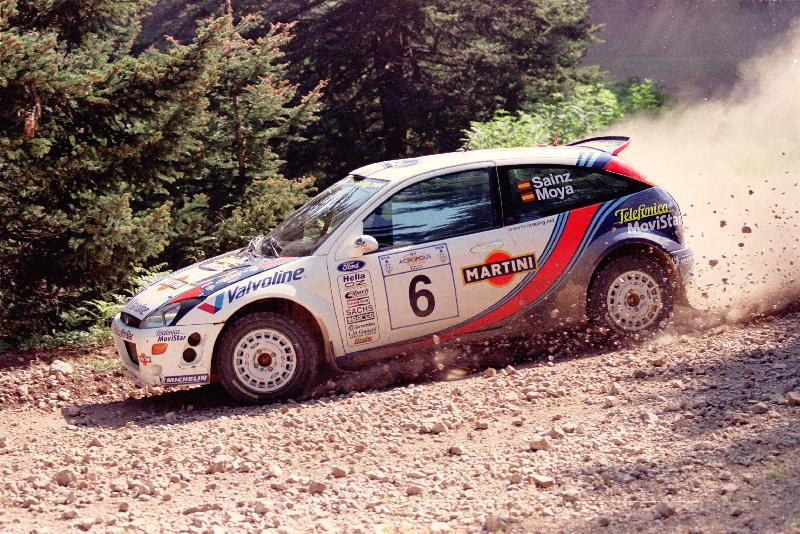
RS WRC 00 at the 2000 Acropolis Rally.

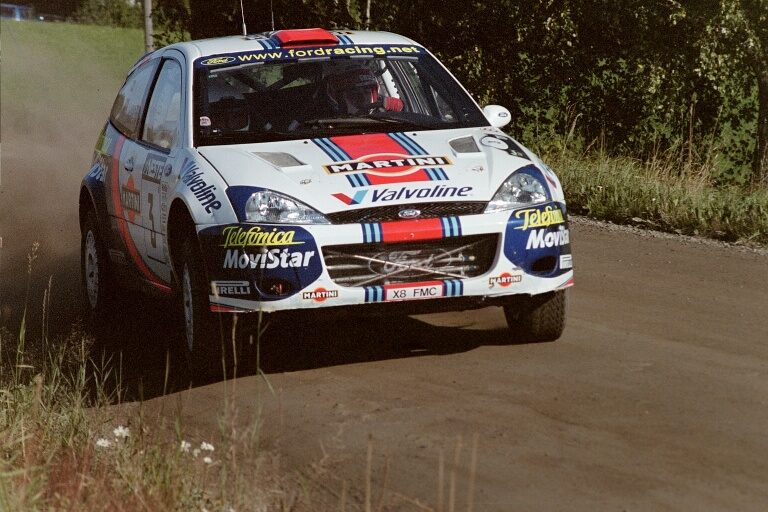
RS WRC 01 at the 2001 Rally Finland.

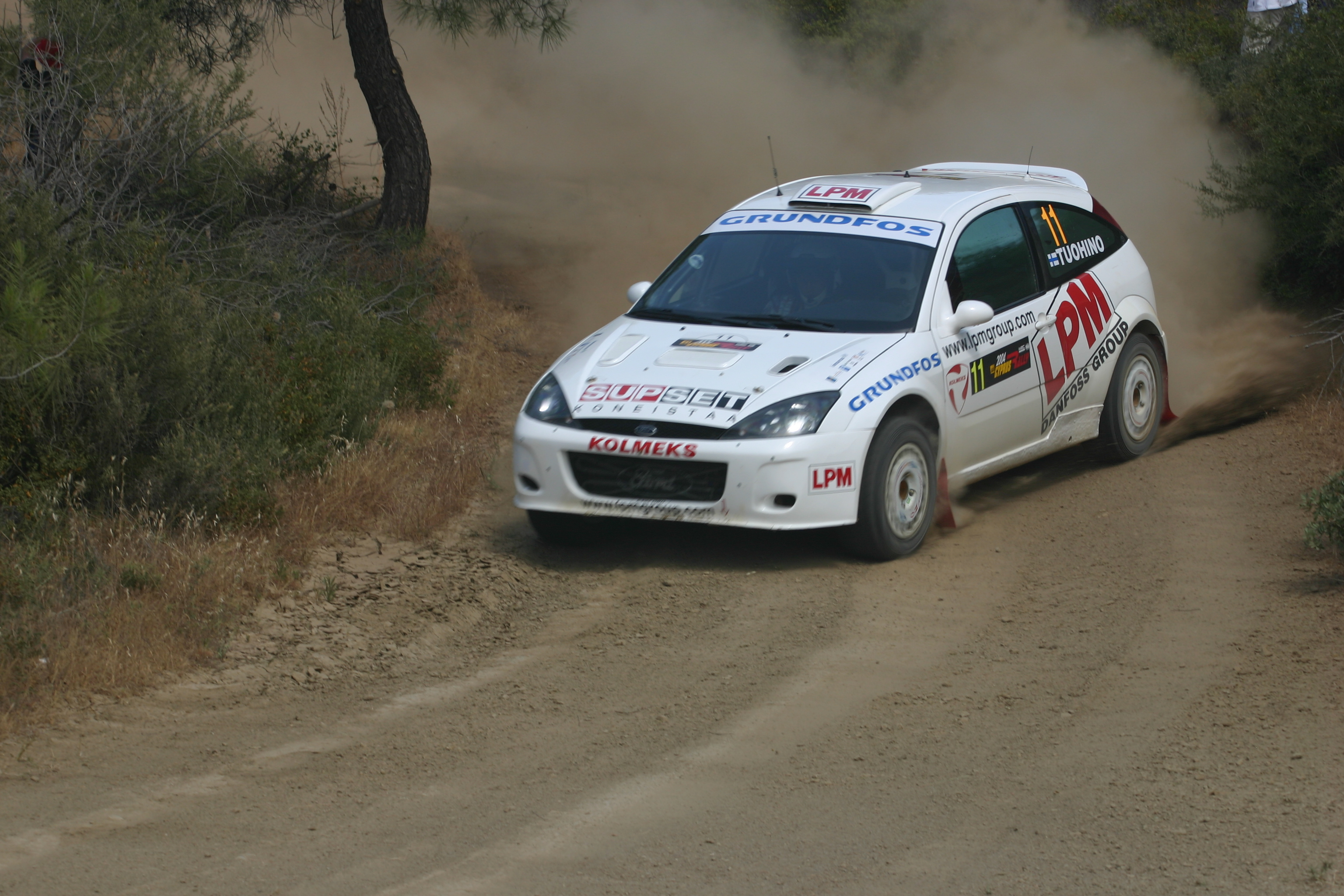
RS WRC 02 at the 2004 Cyprus Rally.

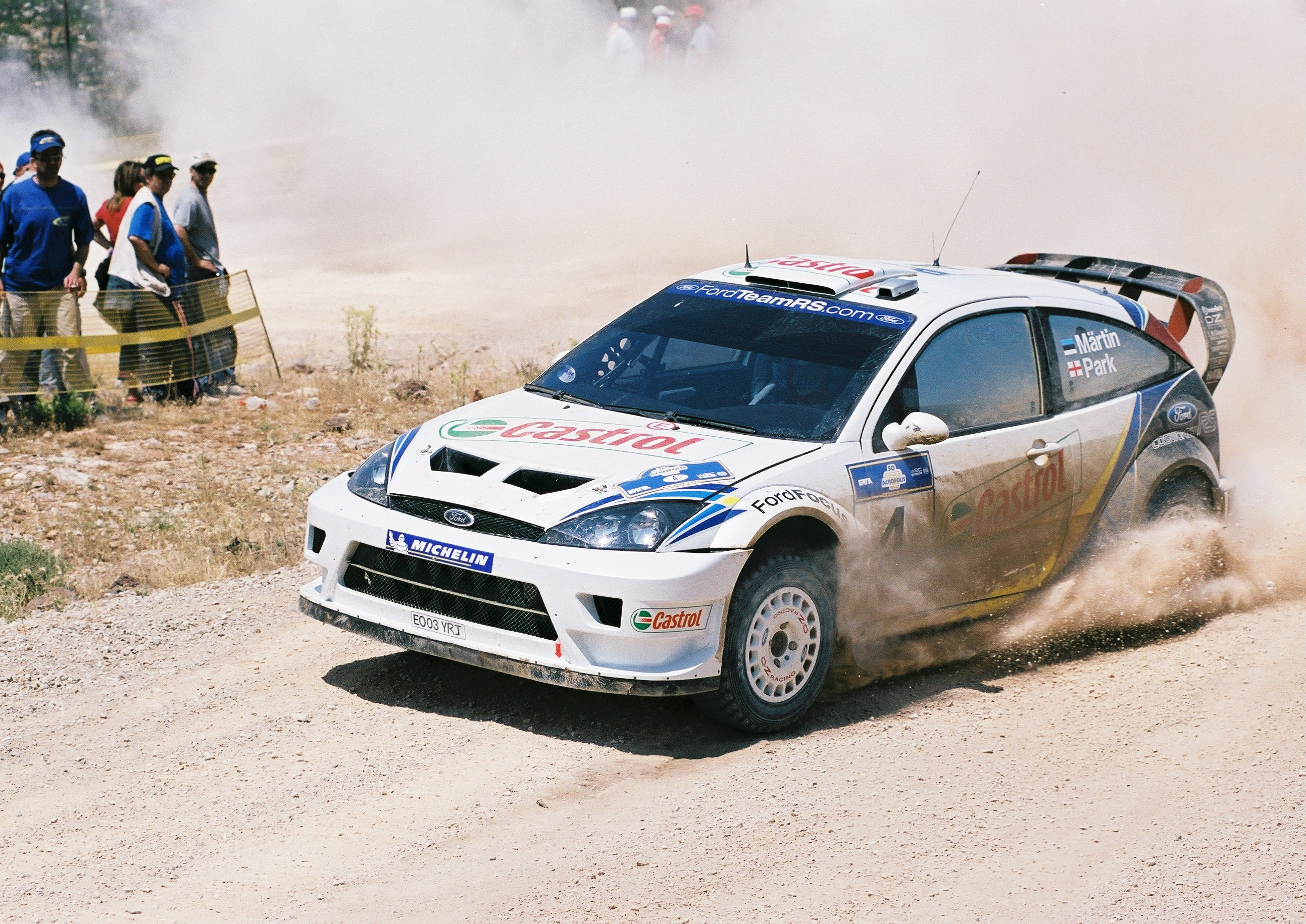
RS WRC 03 at the 2003 Acropolis Rally.

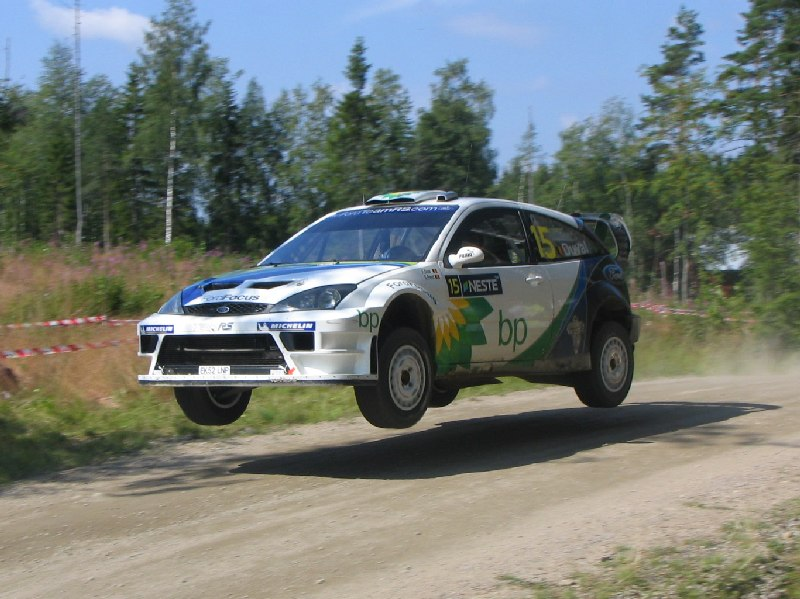
RS WRC 04 at the 2004 Rally Finland.

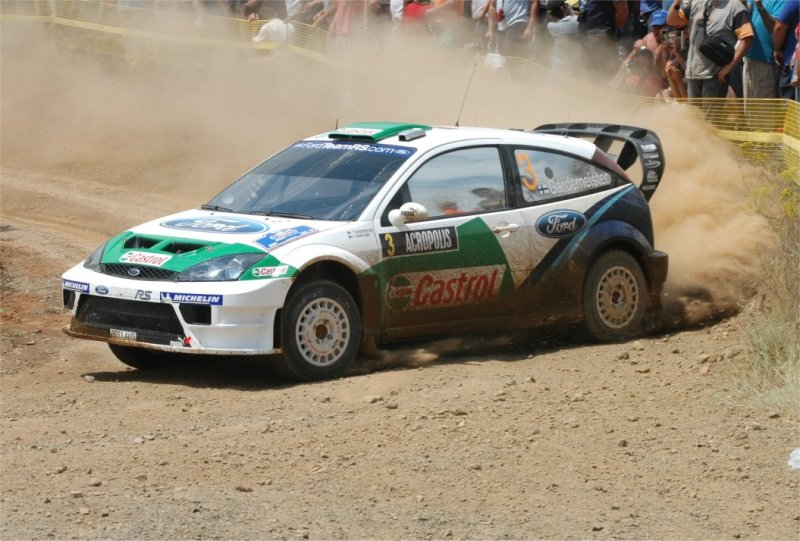
RS WRC 04 at the 2005 Acropolis Rally.

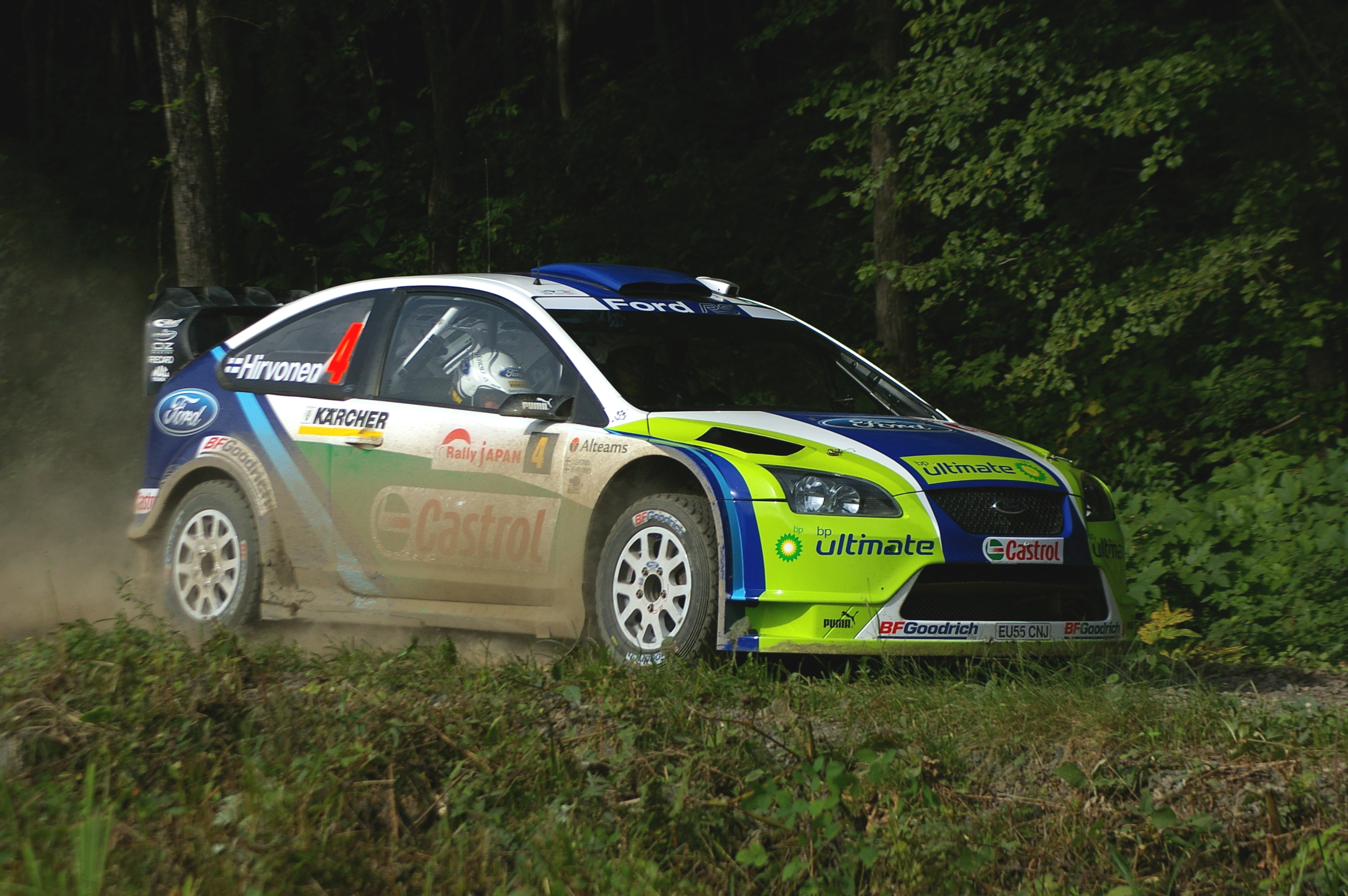
RS WRC 06 at the 2006 Rally Japan.

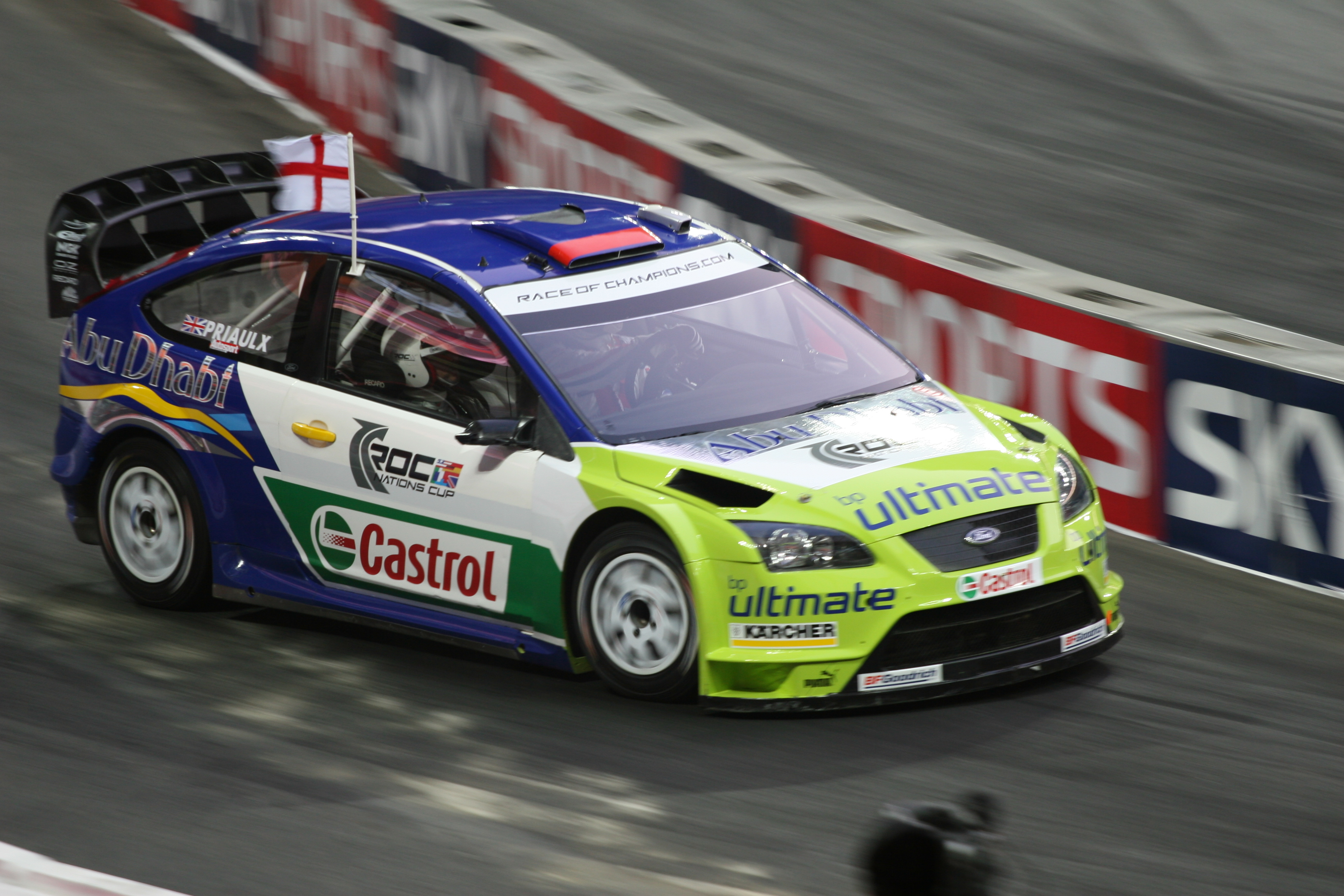
RS WRC 07 at the 2007 Race of Champions.

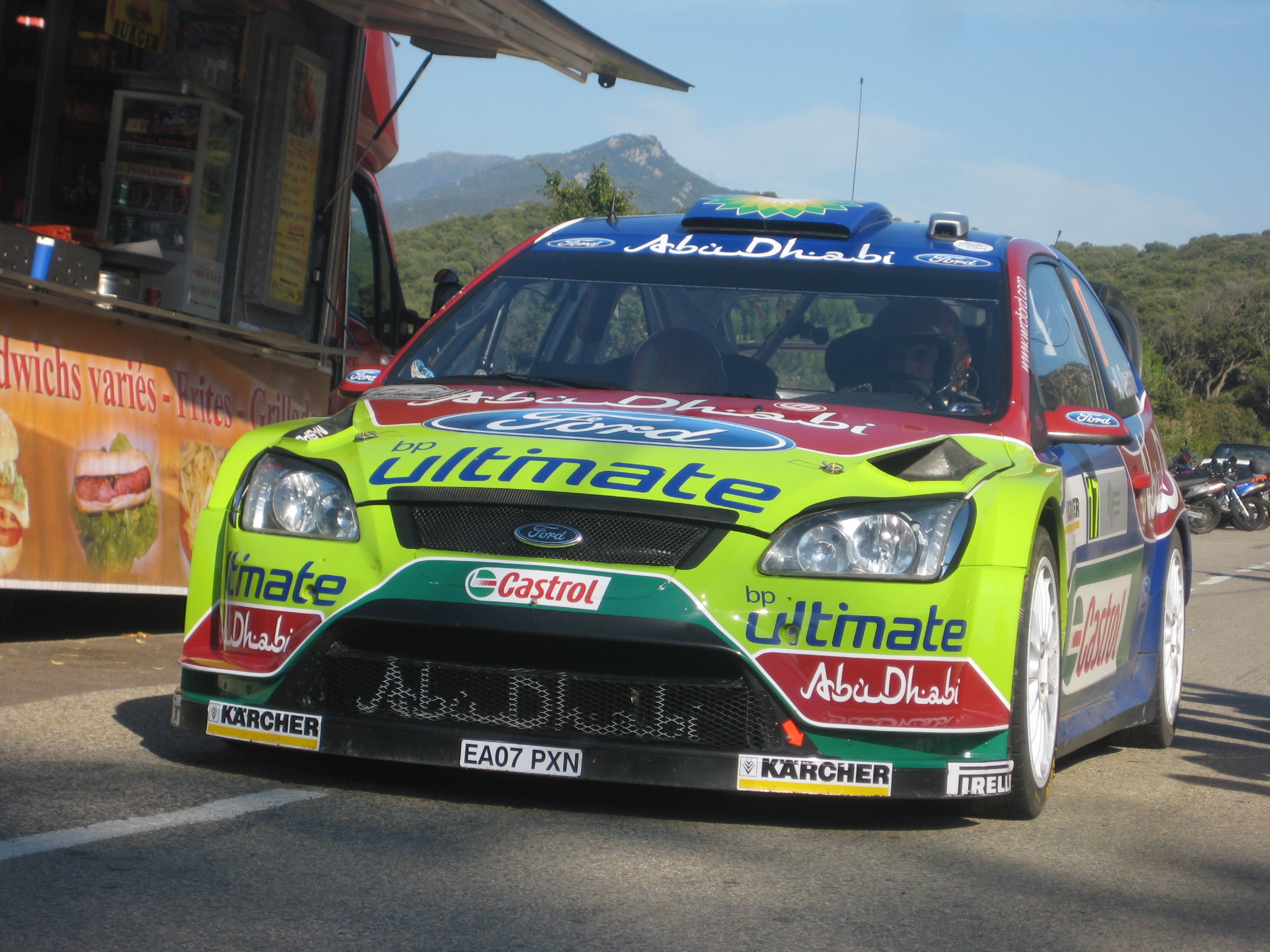
RS WRC 08 at the 2008 Tour de Corse

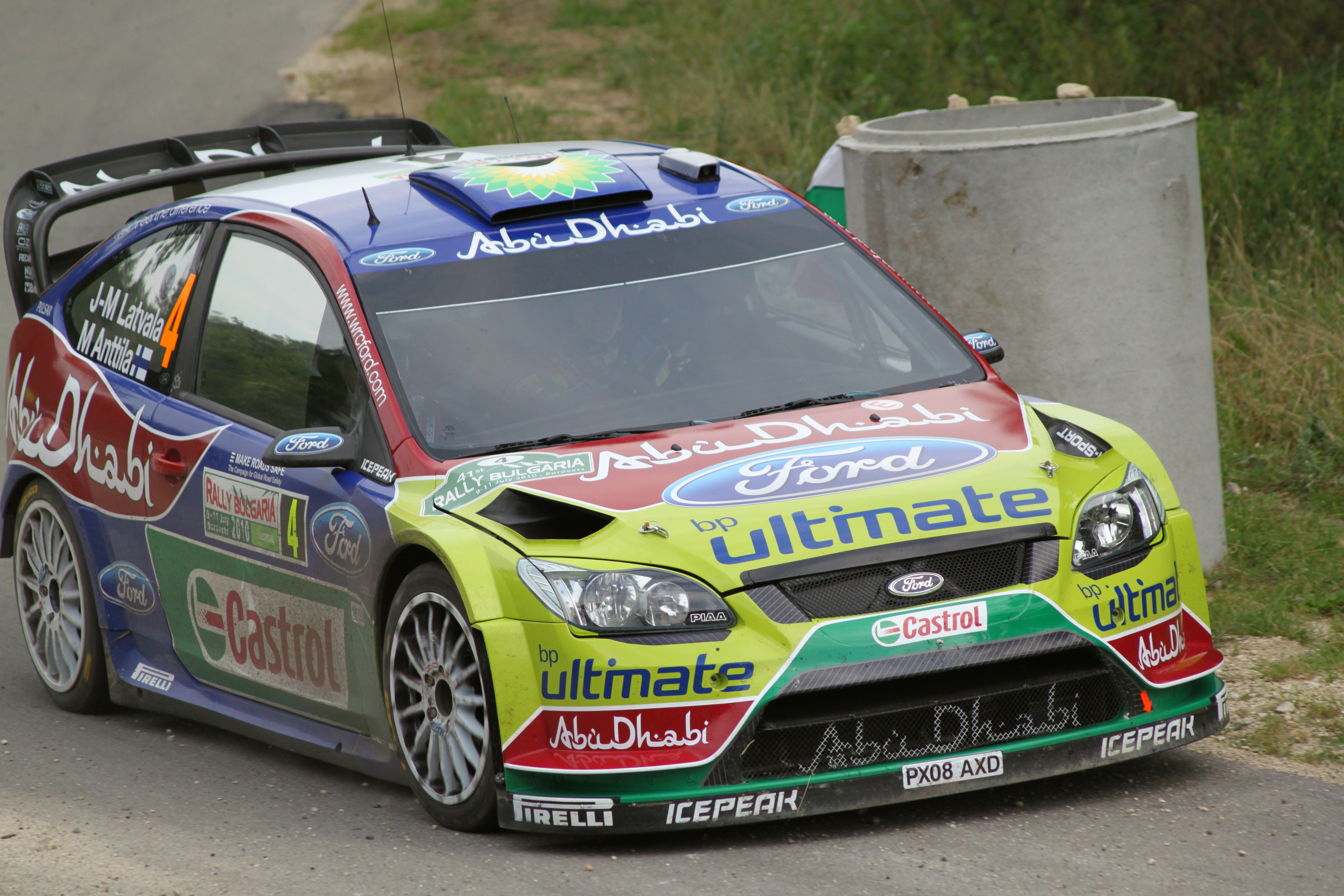
RS WRC 09 at the 2010 Rally Bulgaria

Awards
Preceded by Toyota Corolla WRC	Autosport; Rally Car of the Year; 2000, 2001	Succeeded by Peugeot 206 WRC
Preceded by Citroën Xsara WRC	Autosport; Rally Car of the Year; 2006, 2007	Succeeded by Citroën C4 WRC
