= Michael Park (co-driver) =

British rally co-driver (1966–2005)

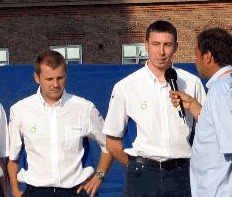
- Park (left) and Markko Märtin (right)

Personal information
- Born: 22 June 1966; Newent, Gloucestershire, England
- Died: 18 September 2005 (aged 39); Bryn, Neath Port Talbot, Wales

World Rally Championship record
- Years active: 1994, 1999–2005
- Driver: (United Kingdom) David Higgins (Saudi Arabia) Abdullah Bakhashab (Estonia) Markko Märtin
- Teams: Lukoil EOS Rally Team, Subaru World Rally Team, Ford, Peugeot
- Rallies: 83
- Championships: 0
- Rally wins: 5
- Podiums: 18
- Stage wins: 101
- First rally: 1994 RAC Rally
- Last rally: 2005 Wales Rally GB

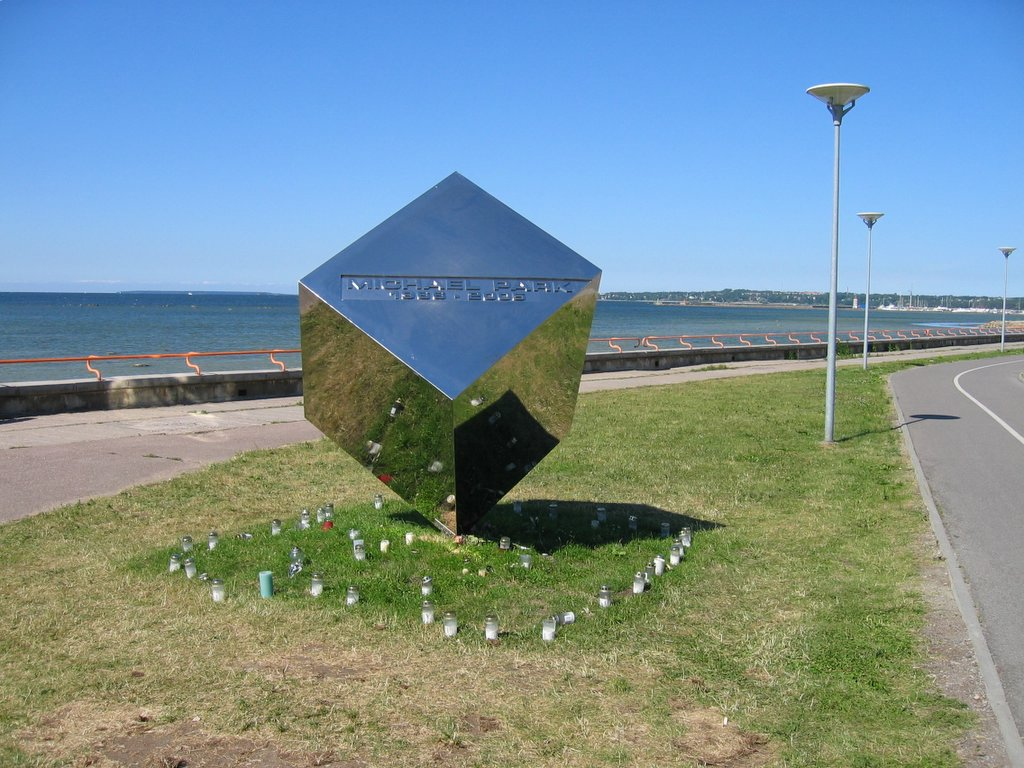
Monument dedicated to Michael Park, Tallinn, Estonia

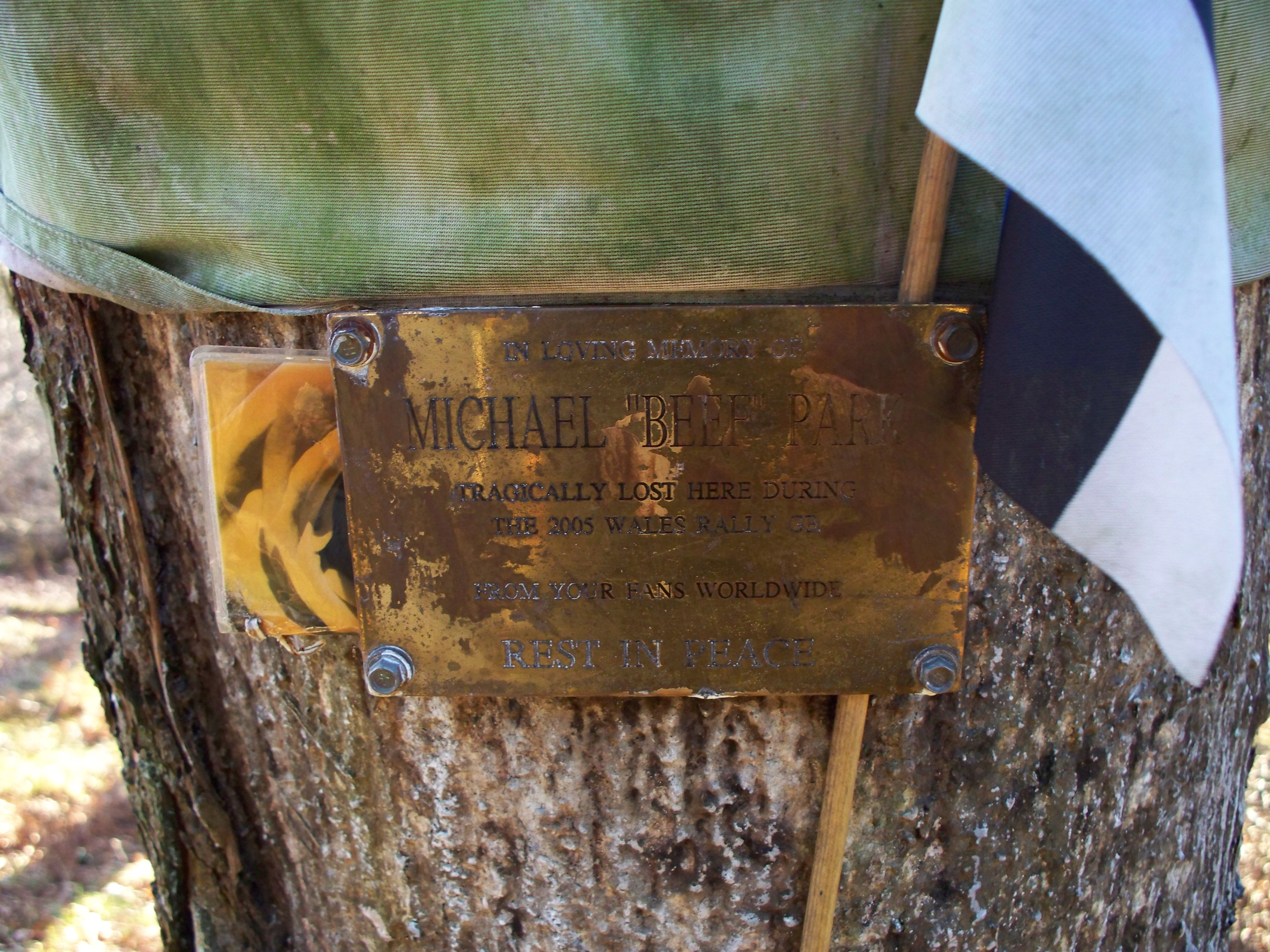
The memorial placed on the tree where Park lost his life during the 2005 Wales Rally GB in Bryn.

Michael Steven Park (22 June 1966 – 18 September 2005) was a rally co-driver from Newent in Gloucestershire. He worked with former world champions Richard Burns and Colin McRae as a gravel note expert while co-driving for both David Higgins and Mark Higgins in the British national series. His big break, however, came when he teamed up with the emerging Estonian talent Markko Märtin as a privateer pairing in a Toyota Corolla WRC for the 2000 World Rally Championship season.

After a number of strong performances, the pair were signed up by Subaru for 2001, before moving to Ford, where they evolved into one of the leading driver/co-driver combinations in the WRC. In 2003, they took two rally victories, in Greece and Finland, and improved on that figure with three wins in 2004 (Mexico, Corsica and Catalunya).

Park died as a result of injuries sustained in an accident on the final leg of Wales Rally Great Britain when his Peugeot 307 WRC left the road and struck a tree. Märtin and Park were lying fourth in the 2005 season's title race at the time, after securing four podiums in a season dominated by Citroën's Sébastien Loeb. Their performances had been instrumental in Peugeot's challenge for the manufacturer's championship, with the team lying six points behind French rivals Citroën.

After the crash, Märtin said "Park wasn't my co-driver, I was his pilot." Park's death was the first top-level rallying fatality since Rodger Freeth in the 1993 Rally Australia, and brought renewed attention to safety issues in the motorsport world.

On 20 June 2006, a memorial for Park was unveiled in Tallinn, Estonia.

== WRC victories ==
Number	Event	Season	Driver	Car
1	50 th BP Ultimate Acropolis Rally of Greece	2003	Markko Märtin	Ford Focus RS WRC 03
2	53rd Neste Rally Finland	2003	Markko Märtin	Ford Focus RS WRC 03
3	(Mexico) 18º Corona Rally México	2004	Markko Märtin	Ford Focus RS WRC 03
4	48ème Tour de Corse - Rallye de France	2004	Markko Märtin	Ford Focus RS WRC 04
5	(Spain) 40º Rallye Catalunya-Costa Brava (Rallye de España)	2004	Markko Märtin	Ford Focus RS WRC 04
