= Ilka Minor =

Austrian rally co-driver (born 1975)

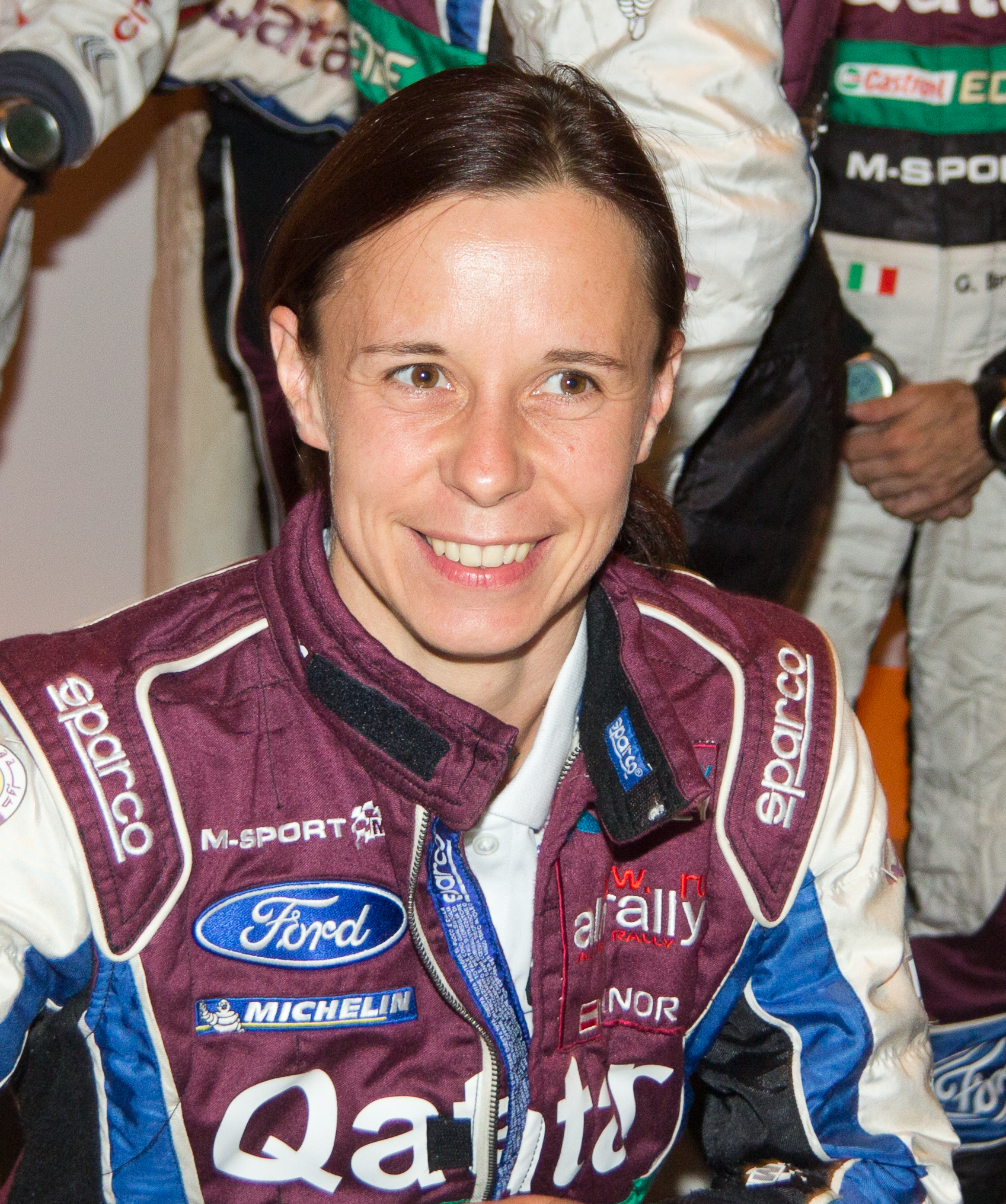
- Minor at the 2013 Rallye Deutschland

Personal information
- Nationality: (Austria) Austrian
- Born: April 30, 1975 (age 51); Klagenfurt, Austria

World Rally Championship record
- Years active: 1997–2007, 2010–2016, 2018–2024, 2026
- Driver: (Austria) Achim Mörtl (Austria) Manfred Stohl (Austria) Rudolf Stohl (Norway) Henning Solberg (Russia) Evgeny Novikov (Norway) Eyvind Brynildsen (Germany) Maro Engel (Austria) Johannes Keferböck (Oman) Hamed Al-Wahaibi (Japan) Hiroki Arai
- Rallies: 156
- Championships: 0
- Rally wins: 0
- Podiums: 8
- Stage wins: 25
- First rally: 1997 Tour de Corse
- Last rally: 2026 Rally Finland

Ilka Minor (born 30 April 1975 in Klagenfurt) is a rallying co-driver from Austria.

== Rally career ==
Minor debuted WRC at the 1997 Tour de Corse. She has partnered several experienced rally drivers throughout her career, including Manfred Stohl, Henning Solberg and Evgeny Novikov. In 2011, she was awarded the Michael Park Trophy, an award given annually in memory of the late co-driver Michael Park. Currently, she is the navigator of Eyvind Brynildsen in the WRC-2 class.

== Complete WRC results ==
Year	Entrant	Car	1	2	3	4	5	6	7	8	9	10	11	12	13	14	15	16	WDC	Points
1997	Achim Mörtl	Subaru Impreza 555	MON	SWE	KEN	POR	ESP	FRA; 17	ARG	GRE	NZL	FIN	IDN	ITA	AUS	GBR			NC	0
1998	Race-Rent Motorsport	Mitsubishi Lancer Evo III	MON	SWE	KEN	POR	ESP	FRA	ARG	GRE	NZL; 15	FIN	ITA	AUS	GBR				NC	0
1999	Manfred Stohl	Mitsubishi Lancer Evolution V	MON	SWE	KEN	POR	ESP	FRA	ARG	GRE; Ret	NZL	FIN	CHN	ITA	AUS	GBR			NC	0
2000	Rudolf Stohl	Mitsubishi Lancer Evolution VI	MON	SWE	KEN; Ret	POR	ESP	ARG	GRE	NZL	FIN	CYP	FRA	ITA	AUS	GBR			NC	0
2001	Top Run	Fiat Punto S1600	MON	SWE	POR	ESP; Ret	ARG	CYP	GRE; Ret	KEN	FIN; Ret	NZL	ITA; Ret	FRA; 22	AUS	GBR; Ret			NC	0
2002	Stohl Racing	Toyota Corolla WRC	MON; 16	SWE	FRA	ESP													NC	0
2002	Stohl Racing	Ford Focus RS WRC 01					CYP; Ret	ARG	GRE	KEN	FIN	GER	ITA			GBR; 12			NC	0
2002	Top Run	Mitsubishi Lancer Evo VI												NZL; 22	AUS; 10				NC	0
2003	Stohl Racing	Peugeot 206 WRC	MON	SWE	TUR	NZL; Ret	ARG				FIN	AUS	ITA	FRA; Ret	ESP	GBR; 7			19th	2
2003	Stohl Racing	Hyundai Accent WRC						GRE; 11	CYP										19th	2
2003	Hyundai World Rally Team	Hyundai Accent WRC								GER; 18									19th	2
2004	OMV World Rally Team	Mitsubishi Lancer Evo VII	MON	SWE; Ret	MEX; Ret	NZL; 10	CYP			ARG; 12	FIN							AUS; Ret	18th	4
2004	OMV World Rally Team	Mitsubishi Lancer Evo VIII										GER; 32	JPN						18th	4
2004	Manfred Stohl	Peugeot 206 WRC						GRE; 6	TUR					GBR; 8	ITA	FRA	ESP		18th	4
2005	OMV World Rally Team	Citroën Xsara WRC	MON; 6	SWE	MEX	NZL; 9	ITA; 9	CYP; 2	TUR	GRE; 20	ARG; 8	FIN; Ret	GER; Ret	GBR; 5	JPN	FRA	ESP	AUS; 3	9th	22
2006	OMV Peugeot Norway World Rally Team	Peugeot 307 WRC	MON; 4	SWE; 18	MEX; 3	ESP; 12	FRA; 7	ARG; 4	ITA; 7	GRE; Ret	GER; 5	FIN; 9	JPN; 5	CYP; 4	TUR; 8	AUS; 3	NZL; 3	GBR; 2	4th	54
2007	OMV Kronos Citroën World Rally Team	Citroën Xsara WRC	MON; 10	SWE; 7	NOR; 12	MEX; 6	POR; 9	ARG; 8	ITA; 7	GRE; 8	FIN; Ret	GER; Ret	NZL; 12	ESP; Ret	FRA; 14	JPN; 6	IRE; Ret	GBR; 8	9th	13
2010	Stobart M-Sport Ford Rally Team	Ford Focus RS WRC 08	SWE; 6	MEX; 6	JOR; 9	TUR; 25	NZL; 7	POR; Ret		FIN; Ret	GER; 37	JPN; 7			GBR; 6				8th	45
2010	Stobart M-Sport Ford Rally Team	Ford Fiesta S2000							BUL; 10				FRA; 9	ESP; 8					8th	45
2011	Stobart M-Sport Ford Rally Team	Ford Fiesta RS WRC	SWE; Ret	MEX; 6	POR; 9	JOR; 14	ITA; Ret	ARG	GRE; 5	FIN; 7	GER; 7	AUS; 14	FRA; 6	ESP; 8	GBR; 3				9th	59
2012	Go Fast Energy World Rally Team	Ford Fiesta RS WRC	MON; 13	SWE; 7	MEX	POR	ARG	GRE		FIN	GER								11th	40
2012	Brazil World Rally Team	Ford Fiesta RS WRC							NZL; 10										11th	40
2012	M-Sport Ford World Rally Team	Ford Fiesta RS WRC										GBR; 6	FRA; 7	ITA; 2	ESP; 10				11th	40
2013	Qatar M-Sport World Rally Team	Ford Fiesta RS WRC	MON; Ret	SWE; 9	MEX; 10	POR; 4	ARG; 4	GRE; 9	ITA; Ret	FIN; 6	GER; 9	AUS; 7	FRA; 5	ESP; 5	GBR; 19				7th	69
2014	Henning Solberg	Ford Fiesta RS WRC	MON	SWE; 7	MEX	POR; 5	ARG		POL; 9	FIN; 9	GER	AUS	FRA	ESP	GBR; Ret				12th	26
2014	Adapta Motorsport	Ford Fiesta RS WRC						ITA; 7											12th	26
2015	Henning Solberg	Ford Fiesta RS WRC	MON; 11																NC	0
2015	Adapta Motorsport	Ford Fiesta RS WRC		SWE; 12	MEX	POR	ARG	ITA	POL	FIN	GER	AUS	FRA	ESP	GBR				NC	0
2016	Henning Solberg	Ford Fiesta RS WRC	MON	SWE; 7	MEX	ARG; 9	POR; 27	ITA; 7	POL; 15		GER	CHN; C	FRA	ESP	GBR	AUS			13th	14
2016	M-Sport Ford World Rally Team	Ford Fiesta R5								FIN; 12									13th	14
2018	Toksport World Rally Team	Škoda Fabia R5	MON	SWE	MEX	FRA	ARG	POR	ITA	FIN	GER	TUR; 6	GBR	ESP; 17	AUS				18th	8
2019	Henning Solberg	Škoda Fabia R5	MON	SWE; 17	MEX	FRA	ARG	CHL	POR; 11	ITA	FIN; 15	GER	TUR; 15	GBR	ESP	AUS; C			NC	0
2020	Toksport World Rally Team	Škoda Fabia Rally2 evo	MON	SWE	MEX	EST; 16	TUR; 18	ITA; 13	MNZ; 21										NC	0
2021	Johannes Keferböck	Škoda Fabia Rally2 evo	MON; 26	ARC	CRO; 21	POR	ITA	KEN	EST	BEL	GRE	FIN	ESP	MNZ					NC	0
2022	Johannes Keferböck	Škoda Fabia Rally2 evo	MON; 26	SWE	CRO; Ret	POR	ITA	KEN	EST	FIN	BEL		NZL	ESP; 32					NC	0
2022	Hamed Al-Wahaibi	Škoda Fabia Rally2 evo										GRE; DNS							NC	0
2022	Ahead Japan Racing Team	Peugeot 208 Rally4													JPN; 15				NC	0
2023	Johannes Keferböck	Škoda Fabia Rally2 evo	MON; 27	SWE	MEX	CRO; 18	POR	ITA; 22	KEN	EST	FIN	GRE	CHL						NC	0
2023	Johannes Keferböck	Škoda Fabia RS Rally2												EUR; 25	JPN				NC	0
2024	HW34 by Motortune	Škoda Fabia RS Rally2	MON	SWE	KEN	CRO	POR	ITA	POL	LAT	FIN; Ret	GRE	CHL	EUR	JPN				NC	0
2026	Johannes Keferböck	Toyota GR Yaris Rally2	MON; 23	SWE	KEN	CRO; 23	ESP; 33	POR	JPN	GRE; 42	EST; 34	FIN; 39	PAR	CHL	ITA	SAU			NC*	0*

^{*} Season still in progress.
