= 2001 Acropolis Rally =

7th round of the 2001 World Rally Championship

2001 Acropolis Rally 48th Acropolis Rally
Round 7 of the 2001 World Rally Championship season
← Previous event	Next event →
- Host country: Greece
- Rally base: Athens
- Dates run: June 15, 2001 – June 17, 2001
- Stages: 20 (387.41 km; 240.73 miles)
- Stage surface: Gravel
- Overall distance: 1,613.98 km (1,002.88 miles)

Statistics
- Crews: 110 at start, 47 at finish

Overall results
- Overall winner: (United Kingdom) Colin McRae (United Kingdom) Nicky Grist (United Kingdom) Ford Motor Co. Ltd. Ford Focus RS WRC '01

The 2001 Acropolis Rally (formally the 48th Acropolis Rally) was the seventh round of the 2001 World Rally Championship. The race was held over three days between 15 June and 17 June 2001, and was won by Ford's Colin McRae, his 3rd win in a row and 23rd win in the World Rally Championship.

== Background ==
=== Entry list ===
No.	Driver	Co-Driver	Entrant	Car	Tyre
World Rally Championship manufacturer entries
1	(Finland) Marcus Grönholm	(Finland) Timo Rautiainen	(France) Peugeot Total	Peugeot 206 WRC	M
2	(France) Didier Auriol	(France) Denis Giraudet	(France) Peugeot Total	Peugeot 206 WRC	M
3	(Spain) Carlos Sainz	(Spain) Luis Moya	(United Kingdom) Ford Motor Co. Ltd.	Ford Focus RS WRC '01	P
4	(United Kingdom) Colin McRae	(United Kingdom) Nicky Grist	(United Kingdom) Ford Motor Co. Ltd.	Ford Focus RS WRC '01	P
5	(United Kingdom) Richard Burns	(United Kingdom) Robert Reid	(Japan) Subaru World Rally Team	Subaru Impreza S7 WRC '01	P
6	(Norway) Petter Solberg	(United Kingdom) Phil Mills	(Japan) Subaru World Rally Team	Subaru Impreza S7 WRC '01	P
7	(Finland) Tommi Mäkinen	(Finland) Risto Mannisenmäki	(Japan) Marlboro Mitsubishi Ralliart	Mitsubishi Lancer Evo 6.5	M
8	(Belgium) Freddy Loix	(Belgium) Sven Smeets	(Japan) Marlboro Mitsubishi Ralliart	Mitsubishi Carisma GT Evo VI	M
9	(Sweden) Kenneth Eriksson	(Sweden) Staffan Parmander	(South Korea) Hyundai Castrol World Rally Team	Hyundai Accent WRC2	M
10	(United Kingdom) Alister McRae	(United Kingdom) David Senior	(South Korea) Hyundai Castrol World Rally Team	Hyundai Accent WRC2	M
11	(Germany) Armin Schwarz	(Germany) Manfred Hiemer	(Czech Republic) Škoda Motorsport	Škoda Octavia WRC Evo2	M
12	(Belgium) Bruno Thiry	(Belgium) Stéphane Prévot	(Czech Republic) Škoda Motorsport	Škoda Octavia WRC Evo2	M
World Rally Championship entries
14	(France) Philippe Bugalski	(France) Jean-Paul Chiaroni	(France) Automobiles Citroën	Citroën Xsara WRC	M
15	(Sweden) Thomas Rådström	(Sweden) Tina Thörner	(France) Automobiles Citroën	Citroën Xsara WRC	M
16	(Finland) Harri Rovanperä	(Finland) Risto Pietiläinen	(France) Peugeot Total	Peugeot 206 WRC	M
17	(France) François Delecour	(France) Daniel Grataloup	(United Kingdom) Ford Motor Co. Ltd.	Ford Focus RS WRC '01	P
18	(Estonia) Markko Märtin	(United Kingdom) Michael Park	(Japan) Subaru World Rally Team	Subaru Impreza S7 WRC '01	P
20	(Japan) Toshihiro Arai	(Australia) Glenn Macneall	(Japan) Subaru World Rally Team	Subaru Impreza S7 WRC '01	P
21	(Greece) Armodios Vovos	(Greece) Loris Meletopoulos	(Greece) Armodios Vovos	Subaru Impreza S6 WRC '00	—N/a
22	(Greece) Ioannis Papadimitriou	(United Kingdom) Chris Patterson	(Greece) Ioannis Papadimitriou	Peugeot 206 WRC	—N/a
23	(Finland) Pasi Hagström	(Finland) Tero Gardemeister	Toyota Castrol Finland	Toyota Corolla WRC	—N/a
24	(Denmark) Henrik Lundgaard	(Denmark) Jens-Christian Anker	Toyota Castrol Team Denmark	Toyota Corolla WRC	—N/a
25	(Monaco) Jean-Pierre Richelmi	(France) Thierry Barjou	(France) H.F. Grifone SRL	Peugeot 206 WRC	M
26	(Oman) Hamed Al-Wahaibi	(New Zealand) Tony Sircombe	Oman Arab World Rally Team	Subaru Impreza S6 WRC '00	—N/a
27	(Germany) Matthias Kahle	(Germany) Peter Göbel	(Germany) Matthias Kahle	Seat Cordoba WRC Evo2	M
28	(France) Gilles Panizzi	(France) Hervé Panizzi	(France) H.F. Grifone SRL	Peugeot 206 WRC	M
30	(France) Jean-Joseph Simon	(France) Jack Boyère	(France) Jean-Joseph Simon	Peugeot 206 WRC	M
31	(Saudi Arabia) Abdullah Bakhashab	(United Kingdom) Bobby Willis	Toyota Team Saudi Arabia	Toyota Corolla WRC	M
37	(United Kingdom) Nigel Heath	(United Kingdom) Steve Lancaster	(United Kingdom) World Rally HIRE	Subaru Impreza S5 WRC '99	—N/a
76	(Czech Republic) Roman Kresta	(Czech Republic) Jan Tománek	(Italy) Jolly Club	Ford Focus WRC '99	M
77	(Italy) Giovanni Recordati	(Monaco) Freddy Delorme	(Italy) Giovanni Recordati	Toyota Corolla WRC	—N/a
78	(United Kingdom) John Lloyd	(United Kingdom) Paul Amandini	(United Kingdom) John Lloyd	Subaru Impreza 555	—N/a
79	(United Kingdom) Alastair Cavenagh	(United Kingdom) Neil Ewing	(United Kingdom) Alastair Cavenagh	Subaru Impreza WRX	—N/a
80	(Germany) Antony Warmbold	(United Kingdom) Gemma Price	(Germany) Antony Warmbold	Toyota Celica GT-Four	—N/a
Group N Cup entries
32	(Argentina) Gabriel Pozzo	(Argentina) Daniel Stillo	(Argentina) Gabriel Pozzo	Mitsubishi Lancer Evo VI	P
33	(Uruguay) Gustavo Trelles	(Argentina) Jorge Del Buono	(Uruguay) Gustavo Trelles	Mitsubishi Lancer Evo VI	—N/a
34	(Sweden) Stig Blomqvist	(Venezuela) Ana Goñi	(United Kingdom) David Sutton Cars Ltd	Mitsubishi Lancer Evo VI	—N/a
35	(Argentina) Marcos Ligato	(Argentina) Rubén García	(Argentina) Marcos Ligato	Mitsubishi Lancer Evo VI	—N/a
36	(San Marino) Mirco Baldacci	(Italy) Maurizio Barone	(San Marino) Mirco Baldacci	Mitsubishi Lancer Evo VI	—N/a
38	(United Kingdom) Natalie Barratt	(Australia) Claire Parker	(United Kingdom) Natalie Barratt Rallysport	Mitsubishi Lancer Evo VI	—N/a
81	(Greece) Konstantinos Apostolou	(Greece) Nikiforos Marangos	(Greece) Konstantinos Apostolou	Subaru Impreza WRX	—N/a
82	(Greece) Panagiotis Hatzitsopanis	(Greece) Konstantinos Stefanis	(Greece) Panagiotis Hatzitsopanis	Subaru Impreza WRX	—N/a
84	(Belgium) Bob Colsoul	(Belgium) Tom Colsoul	(Belgium) Bob Colsoul	Mitsubishi Lancer Evo VI	—N/a
85	(Greece) Pavlos Moschoutis	(Greece) Anastasios Goussetis	(Greece) Pavlos Moschoutis	Mitsubishi Lancer Evo III	—N/a
87	(Greece) Dimitris Vazakas	(Greece) Elias Kordas	(Greece) Dimitris Vazakas	Mitsubishi Lancer Evo III	—N/a
88	(Greece) Dimitris Drivakos	(Greece) Elias Kordas	(Greece) Dimitris Drivakos	Mitsubishi Lancer Evo V	—N/a
89	(Greece) Dimitris Nassoulas	(Greece) Leonidas Mahaeras	(Greece) Dimitris Nassoulas	Mitsubishi Lancer Evo V	—N/a
90	(Greece) Lazaros Panagiotounis	(Greece) Elias Panagiotounis	(Greece) Lazaros Panagiotounis	Mitsubishi Lancer Evo VI	—N/a
91	(Greece) Grigoris Nioras	(Greece) Kostas Lytras	(Greece) Hellenic Police	Subaru Impreza WRX	—N/a
92	(Greece) Ioannis Konstantakatos	(Greece) Apostolos Pallas	(Greece) Ioannis Konstantakatos	Mitsubishi Lancer Evo VI	—N/a
100	(Netherlands) Ries Huisman	(Netherlands) Bart van Riemsdijk	(Netherlands) Ries Huisman	Mitsubishi Lancer Evo VI	—N/a
101	(United Kingdom) Ben Briant	(United Kingdom) Tim Line	(United Kingdom) Ben Briant	Mitsubishi Lancer Evo V	—N/a
102	(United Kingdom) Alistair Ginley	(United Kingdom) John Bennie	(United Kingdom) Alistair Ginley	Mitsubishi Lancer Evo VI	—N/a
103	(Italy) Fabio Frisiero	(Italy) Simone Scattolin	(Italy) Fabio Frisiero	Mitsubishi Lancer Evo VI	—N/a
104	(Italy) Luca Betti	(Italy) Andrea Gorni	(Italy) Luca Betti	Mitsubishi Lancer Evo V	—N/a
105	(Belgium) David Sterckx	(Belgium) Pascal Lopes	(Belgium) David Sterckx	Mitsubishi Lancer Evo VI	—N/a
112	(Greece) Ioannis Panourgias	(Greece) Anastasios Athanassiou	(Greece) Ioannis Panourgias	Renault Clio Williams	—N/a
Super 1600 Cup entries
50	(Austria) Manfred Stohl	(Austria) Ilka Minor	(Italy) Top Run SRL	Fiat Punto S1600	—N/a
51	(France) Patrick Magaud	(France) Guylène Brun	(United Kingdom) Ford Motor Co. Ltd.	Ford Puma S1600	—N/a
52	(Italy) Andrea Dallavilla	(Italy) Massimo Chiapponi	(Italy) R&D Motorsport	Fiat Punto S1600	M
53	(France) Sébastien Loeb	(Monaco) Daniel Elena	(France) Citroën Sport	Citroën Saxo S1600	M
54	(Belgium) Larry Cols	(Belgium) Yasmine Gerard	(Belgium) Peugeot Bastos Racing	Peugeot 206 S1600	—N/a
55	(United Kingdom) Niall McShea	(United Kingdom) Michael Orr	(United Kingdom) Ford Motor Co. Ltd.	Ford Puma S1600	—N/a
56	(Italy) Giandomenico Basso	(Italy) Flavio Guglielmini	(Italy) Top Run SRL	Fiat Punto S1600	—N/a
57	(France) Cédric Robert	(France) Marie-Pierre Billoux	(France) Team Gamma	Peugeot 206 S1600	—N/a
58	(Spain) Sergio Vallejo	(Spain) Diego Vallejo	(Spain) Pronto Racing	Fiat Punto S1600	M
59	(France) Benoît Rousselot	(France) Gilles Mondésir	(United Kingdom) Ford Motor Co. Ltd.	Ford Puma S1600	—N/a
60	(Switzerland) Cyril Henny	(Switzerland) Aurore Maëder-Brand	(Switzerland) Rally Team Henny	Citroën Saxo S1600	—N/a
61	(Italy) Corrado Fontana	(Italy) Renzo Casazza	(Italy) H.F. Grifone SRL	Peugeot 206 S1600	—N/a
62	(Finland) Jussi Välimäki	(Finland) Jakke Honkanen	(Finland) ST Motors	Peugeot 206 S1600	—N/a
63	(Norway) Martin Stenshorne	(United Kingdom) Clive Jenkins	(Norway) Zeta Racing	Ford Puma S1600	—N/a
64	(Italy) Massimo Macaluso	(Italy) Antonio Celot	(Italy) R&D Motorsport	Fiat Punto S1600	M
65	(Paraguay) Alejandro Galanti	(Paraguay) Fernando Zuleta	(Italy) Astra Racing	Ford Puma S1600	—N/a
67	(Andorra) Albert Llovera	(Spain) Marc Corral	(Spain) Pronto Racing	Fiat Punto S1600	M
68	(Italy) Massimo Ceccato	(Italy) Mitia Dotta	(Italy) Hawk Racing Club	Fiat Punto S1600	—N/a
69	(France) Nicolas Bernardi	(France) Delphine Bernardi	(France) Team Gamma	Peugeot 206 S1600	—N/a
71	(Belgium) François Duval	(Belgium) Jean-Marc Fortin	(United Kingdom) Ford Motor Co. Ltd.	Ford Puma S1600	—N/a
72	(Malaysia) Saladin Mazlan	(United Kingdom) Timothy Sturla	(Malaysia) Saladin Rallying	Ford Puma S1600	—N/a
73	(Italy) Christian Chemin	(Italy) Matteo Alberto Bacchin	(Italy) Hawk Racing Club	Fiat Punto S1600	—N/a

=== Itinerary ===
All dates and times are EEST (UTC+3).

Date	Time	No.	Stage name	Distance
Leg 1 — 143.54 km
15 June	10:13	SS1	Mendenitsa 1	26.92 km
15 June	10:58	SS2	Paleohori	10.85 km
15 June	12:33	SS3	Inohori 1	23.00 km
15 June	13:16	SS4	Pavliani 1	24.45 km
15 June	16:00	SS5	Elatia	31.40 km
15 June	17:28	SS6	Mendenitsa 2	26.92 km
Leg 2 — 117.61 km
16 June	17:28	SS7	Pavliani 2	24.45 km
16 June	10:23	SS8	Karoutes 1	18.89 km
16 June	12:56	SS9	Livadia 1	11.66 km
16 June	13:34	SS10	Stiri 1	3.59 km
16 June	14:31	SS11	Gravia 1	17.13 km
16 June	16:16	SS12	Inohori 2	23.00 km
16 June	17:24	SS13	Karoutes 2	18.89 km
Leg 3 — 126.26 km
17 June	08:33	SS14	Amfiklia 1	8.25 km
17 June	09:06	SS15	Elatia — Rengini 1	38.69 km
17 June	12:04	SS16	Livadia 2	11.66 km
17 June	12:42	SS17	Stiri 2	3.59 km
17 June	13:39	SS18	Gravia 2	17.13 km
17 June	15:07	SS19	Amfiklia 2	8.25 km
17 June	15:40	SS20	Elatia — Rengini 2	38.69 km

== Results ==
=== Overall ===
Pos.	No.	Driver	Co-driver	Team	Car	Time	Difference	Points
1	4	(United Kingdom) Colin McRae	(United Kingdom) Nicky Grist	(United Kingdom) Ford Motor Co. Ltd.	Ford Focus RS WRC '01	4:19:01.9		10
2	6	(Norway) Petter Solberg	(United Kingdom) Phil Mills	(Japan) Subaru World Rally Team	Subaru Impreza S7 WRC '01	4:19:50.9	+49.0	6
3	16	(Finland) Harri Rovanperä	(Finland) Risto Pietiläinen	(France) Peugeot Total	Peugeot 206 WRC	4:20:37.6	+1:35.7	4
4	7	(Finland) Tommi Mäkinen	(Finland) Risto Mannisenmäki	(Japan) Marlboro Mitsubishi Ralliart	Mitsubishi Lancer Evo 6.5	4:21:17.2	+2:15.3	3
5	17	(France) François Delecour	(France) Daniel Grataloup	(United Kingdom) Ford Motor Co. Ltd.	Ford Focus RS WRC '01	4:21:37.3	+2:35.4	2
6	14	(France) Philippe Bugalski	(France) Jean-Paul Chiaroni	(France) Automobiles Citroën	Citroën Xsara WRC	4:23:02.1	+4:00.2	1

=== World Rally Cars ===
==== Classification ====
Position		No.	Driver	Co-driver	Entrant	Car	Time	Difference	Points
Event	Class	No.	Driver	Co-driver	Entrant	Car	Time	Difference	Points
1	1	4	(United Kingdom) Colin McRae	(United Kingdom) Nicky Grist	(United Kingdom) Ford Motor Co. Ltd.	Ford Focus RS WRC '01	4:19:01.9		10
2	2	6	(Norway) Petter Solberg	(United Kingdom) Phil Mills	(Japan) Subaru World Rally Team	Subaru Impreza S7 WRC '01	4:19:50.9	+49.0	6
4	3	7	(Finland) Tommi Mäkinen	(Finland) Risto Mannisenmäki	(Japan) Marlboro Mitsubishi Ralliart	Mitsubishi Lancer Evo 6.5	4:21:17.2	+2:15.3	3
7	4	11	(Germany) Armin Schwarz	(Germany) Manfred Hiemer	(Czech Republic) Škoda Motorsport	Škoda Octavia WRC Evo2	4:24:58.6	+5:56.7	0
9	5	8	(Belgium) Freddy Loix	(Belgium) Sven Smeets	(Japan) Marlboro Mitsubishi Ralliart	Mitsubishi Carisma GT Evo VI	4:27:02.8	+8:00.9	0
10	6	12	(Belgium) Bruno Thiry	(Belgium) Stéphane Prévot	(Czech Republic) Škoda Motorsport	Škoda Octavia WRC Evo2	4:27:37.6	+8:35.7	0
15	7	10	(United Kingdom) Alister McRae	(United Kingdom) David Senior	(South Korea) Hyundai Castrol World Rally Team	Hyundai Accent WRC2	4:44:20.7	+25:18.8	0
Retired SS20		3	(Spain) Carlos Sainz	(Spain) Luis Moya	(United Kingdom) Ford Motor Co. Ltd.	Ford Focus RS WRC '01	Engine		0
Retired SS19		5	(United Kingdom) Richard Burns	(United Kingdom) Robert Reid	(Japan) Subaru World Rally Team	Subaru Impreza S7 WRC '01	Transmission		0
Retired SS7		9	(Sweden) Kenneth Eriksson	(Sweden) Staffan Parmander	(South Korea) Hyundai Castrol World Rally Team	Hyundai Accent WRC2	Turbo		0
Retired SS3		1	(Finland) Marcus Grönholm	(Finland) Timo Rautiainen	(France) Peugeot Total	Peugeot 206 WRC	Oil pressure		0
Retired SS1		2	(France) Didier Auriol	(France) Denis Giraudet	(France) Peugeot Total	Peugeot 206 WRC	Clutch		0

==== Special stages ====
Day	Stage	Stage name	Length	Winner	Car	Time	Class leaders
Leg 1 (15 Jun)	SS1	Mendenitsa 1	26.92 km	(United Kingdom) Richard Burns	Subaru Impreza S7 WRC '01	19:14.0	(United Kingdom) Richard Burns
Leg 1 (15 Jun)	SS2	Paleohori	10.85 km	(Norway) Petter Solberg	Subaru Impreza S7 WRC '01	8:07.8	(Norway) Petter Solberg
Leg 1 (15 Jun)	SS3	Inohori 1	23.00 km	(Estonia) Markko Märtin	Subaru Impreza S7 WRC '01	18:27.1	(Norway) Petter Solberg
Leg 1 (15 Jun)	SS4	Pavliani 1	24.45 km	(United Kingdom) Colin McRae	Ford Focus RS WRC '01	20:17.2	(Norway) Petter Solberg
Leg 1 (15 Jun)	SS5	Elatia	31.40 km	Stage cancelled			(Norway) Petter Solberg
Leg 1 (15 Jun)	SS6	Mendenitsa 2	26.92 km	(United Kingdom) Colin McRae	Ford Focus RS WRC '01	19:14.2	(United Kingdom) Colin McRae
Leg 2 (16 Jun)	SS7	Pavliani 2	24.45 km	(France) François Delecour	Ford Focus RS WRC '01	19:46.0	(United Kingdom) Colin McRae
Leg 2 (16 Jun)	SS8	Karoutes 1	18.89 km	(France) François Delecour	Ford Focus RS WRC '01	12:12.8	(United Kingdom) Colin McRae
Leg 2 (16 Jun)	SS9	Livadia 1	11.66 km	(Spain) Carlos Sainz	Ford Focus RS WRC '01	9:26.2	(United Kingdom) Colin McRae
Leg 2 (16 Jun)	SS10	Stiri 1	3.59 km	(France) François Delecour	Ford Focus RS WRC '01	1:57.3	(United Kingdom) Colin McRae
Leg 2 (16 Jun)	SS11	Gravia 1	17.13 km	(Spain) Carlos Sainz	Ford Focus RS WRC '01	13:17.3	(United Kingdom) Colin McRae
Leg 2 (16 Jun)	SS12	Inohori 2	23.00 km	(France) François Delecour	Ford Focus RS WRC '01	18:13.2	(United Kingdom) Colin McRae
Leg 2 (16 Jun)	SS13	Karoutes 2	18.89 km	(United Kingdom) Richard Burns	Subaru Impreza S7 WRC '01	12:03.4	(United Kingdom) Colin McRae
Leg 3 (17 Jun)	SS14	Amfiklia 1	8.25 km	(United Kingdom) Richard Burns	Subaru Impreza S7 WRC '01	4:49.6	(United Kingdom) Colin McRae
Leg 3 (17 Jun)	SS15	Elatia — Rengini 1	38.69 km	(Norway) Petter Solberg	Subaru Impreza S7 WRC '01	25:37.5	(United Kingdom) Colin McRae
Leg 3 (17 Jun)	SS16	Livadia 2	11.66 km	(United Kingdom) Richard Burns	Subaru Impreza S7 WRC '01	9:19.2	(United Kingdom) Colin McRae
Leg 3 (17 Jun)	SS17	Stiri 2	3.59 km	(Spain) Carlos Sainz	Ford Focus RS WRC '01	1:55.6	(United Kingdom) Colin McRae
Leg 3 (17 Jun)	SS18	Gravia 2	17.13 km	(Spain) Carlos Sainz	Ford Focus RS WRC '01	13:03.2	(United Kingdom) Colin McRae
Leg 3 (17 Jun)	SS19	Amfiklia 2	8.25 km	(Spain) Carlos Sainz	Ford Focus RS WRC '01	4:49.2	(United Kingdom) Colin McRae
Leg 3 (17 Jun)	SS20	Elatia — Rengini 2	38.69 km	(Finland) Tommi Mäkinen	Mitsubishi Lancer Evo 6.5	25:32.6	(United Kingdom) Colin McRae

==== Championship standings ====
Pos.	Drivers' championships			Co-drivers' championships			Manufacturers' championships		
Pos.	Move	Driver	Points	Move	Co-driver	Points	Move	Manufacturer	Points
1	2	(United Kingdom) Colin McRae	30	2	(United Kingdom) Nicky Grist	30		(United Kingdom) Ford Motor Co. Ltd.	60
2	1	(Finland) Tommi Mäkinen	30	1	(Finland) Risto Mannisenmäki	30		(Japan) Marlboro Mitsubishi Ralliart	53
3	1	(Spain) Carlos Sainz	26	1	(Spain) Luis Moya	26		(Japan) Subaru World Rally Team	28
4		(United Kingdom) Richard Burns	15		(United Kingdom) Robert Reid	15		(France) Peugeot Total	20
5	1	(Finland) Harri Rovanperä	14	1	(Finland) Risto Pietiläinen	14	1	(Czech Republic) Škoda Motorsport	11

=== FIA Cup for Production Rally Drivers ===
==== Classification ====
Position		No.	Driver	Co-driver	Entrant	Car	Time	Difference	Points
Event	Class	No.	Driver	Co-driver	Entrant	Car	Time	Difference	Points
13	1	32	(Argentina) Gabriel Pozzo	(Argentina) Daniel Stillo	(Argentina) Gabriel Pozzo	Mitsubishi Lancer Evo VI	4:40:17.9		10
14	2	33	(Uruguay) Gustavo Trelles	(Argentina) Jorge Del Buono	(Uruguay) Gustavo Trelles	Mitsubishi Lancer Evo VI	4:41:14.6	+56.7	6
16	3	35	(Argentina) Marcos Ligato	(Argentina) Rubén García	(Argentina) Marcos Ligato	Mitsubishi Lancer Evo VI	4:48:49.8	+8:31.9	4
17	4	36	(San Marino) Mirco Baldacci	(Italy) Maurizio Barone	(San Marino) Mirco Baldacci	Mitsubishi Lancer Evo VI	4:54:52.2	+14:34.3	3
18	5	82	(Greece) Panagiotis Hatzitsopanis	(Greece) Konstantinos Stefanis	(Greece) Panagiotis Hatzitsopanis	Subaru Impreza WRX	4:55:10.9	+14:53.0	2
21	6	88	(Greece) Dimitris Drivakos	(Greece) Elias Kordas	(Greece) Dimitris Drivakos	Mitsubishi Lancer Evo V	5:05:33.0	+25:15.1	1
25	7	90	(Greece) Lazaros Panagiotounis	(Greece) Elias Panagiotounis	(Greece) Lazaros Panagiotounis	Mitsubishi Lancer Evo VI	5:13:08.3	+32:50.4	0
29	8	85	(Greece) Pavlos Moschoutis	(Greece) Anastasios Goussetis	(Greece) Pavlos Moschoutis	Mitsubishi Lancer Evo III	5:18:35.3	+38:17.4	0
32	9	91	(Greece) Grigoris Nioras	(Greece) Kostas Lytras	(Greece) Hellenic Police	Subaru Impreza WRX	5:21:00.4	+40:42.5	0
35	10	38	(United Kingdom) Natalie Barratt	(Australia) Claire Parker	(United Kingdom) Natalie Barratt Rallysport	Mitsubishi Lancer Evo VI	5:32:26.9	+52:09.0	0
Retired SS20		112	(Greece) Ioannis Panourgias	(Greece) Anastasios Athanassiou	(Greece) Ioannis Panourgias	Renault Clio Williams	Mechanical		0
Retired SS16		89	(Greece) Dimitris Nassoulas	(Greece) Leonidas Mahaeras	(Greece) Dimitris Nassoulas	Mitsubishi Lancer Evo V	Mechanical		0
Retired SS14		84	(Belgium) Bob Colsoul	(Belgium) Tom Colsoul	(Belgium) Bob Colsoul	Mitsubishi Lancer Evo VI	Over time limit		0
Retired SS14		101	(United Kingdom) Ben Briant	(United Kingdom) Tim Line	(United Kingdom) Ben Briant	Mitsubishi Lancer Evo V	Over time limit		0
Retired SS13		104	(Italy) Luca Betti	(Italy) Andrea Gorni	(Italy) Luca Betti	Mitsubishi Lancer Evo V	Engine		0
Retired SS9		100	(Netherlands) Ries Huisman	(Netherlands) Bart van Riemsdijk	(Netherlands) Ries Huisman	Mitsubishi Lancer Evo VI	Retired		0
Retired SS7		102	(United Kingdom) Alistair Ginley	(United Kingdom) John Bennie	(United Kingdom) Alistair Ginley	Mitsubishi Lancer Evo VI	Retired		0
Retired SS7		103	(Italy) Fabio Frisiero	(Italy) Simone Scattolin	(Italy) Fabio Frisiero	Mitsubishi Lancer Evo VI	Mechanical		0
Retired SS6		34	(Sweden) Stig Blomqvist	(Venezuela) Ana Goñi	(United Kingdom) David Sutton Cars Ltd	Mitsubishi Lancer Evo VI	Mechanical		0
Retired SS6		105	(Belgium) David Sterckx	(Belgium) Pascal Lopes	(Belgium) David Sterckx	Mitsubishi Lancer Evo VI	Over time limit		0
Retired SS3		81	(Greece) Konstantinos Apostolou	(Greece) Nikiforos Marangos	(Greece) Konstantinos Apostolou	Subaru Impreza WRX	Accident		0
Retired SS3		87	(Greece) Dimitris Vazakas	(Greece) Elias Kordas	(Greece) Dimitris Vazakas	Mitsubishi Lancer Evo III	Engine		0
Retired SS2		92	(Greece) Ioannis Konstantakatos	(Greece) Apostolos Pallas	(Greece) Ioannis Konstantakatos	Mitsubishi Lancer Evo VI	Brakes		0

==== Special stages ====
Day	Stage	Stage name	Length	Winner	Car	Time	Class leaders
Leg 1 (15 Jun)	SS1	Mendenitsa 1	26.92 km	(Sweden) Stig Blomqvist	Mitsubishi Lancer Evo VI	21:08.1	(Sweden) Stig Blomqvist
Leg 1 (15 Jun)	SS2	Paleohori	10.85 km	(Argentina) Gabriel Pozzo	Mitsubishi Lancer Evo VI	8:50.5	(Sweden) Stig Blomqvist
Leg 1 (15 Jun)	SS3	Inohori 1	23.00 km	(Argentina) Gabriel Pozzo	Mitsubishi Lancer Evo VI	19:43.6	(Argentina) Gabriel Pozzo
Leg 1 (15 Jun)	SS4	Pavliani 1	24.45 km	(Argentina) Gabriel Pozzo	Mitsubishi Lancer Evo VI	21:22.6	(Argentina) Gabriel Pozzo
Leg 1 (15 Jun)	SS5	Elatia	31.40 km	Stage cancelled			(Argentina) Gabriel Pozzo
Leg 1 (15 Jun)	SS6	Mendenitsa 2	26.92 km	(Uruguay) Gustavo Trelles	Mitsubishi Lancer Evo VI	21:58.0	(Argentina) Gabriel Pozzo
Leg 2 (16 Jun)	SS7	Pavliani 2	24.45 km	(Argentina) Gabriel Pozzo	Mitsubishi Lancer Evo VI	21:17.9	(Argentina) Gabriel Pozzo
Leg 2 (16 Jun)	SS8	Karoutes 1	18.89 km	(Greece) Panagiotis Hatzitsopanis	Subaru Impreza WRX	13:28.4	(Argentina) Gabriel Pozzo
Leg 2 (16 Jun)	SS9	Livadia 1	11.66 km	(Argentina) Gabriel Pozzo	Mitsubishi Lancer Evo VI	10:05.8	(Argentina) Gabriel Pozzo
Leg 2 (16 Jun)	SS10	Stiri 1	3.59 km	(Argentina) Gabriel Pozzo	Mitsubishi Lancer Evo VI	2:06.5	(Argentina) Gabriel Pozzo
Leg 2 (16 Jun)	SS11	Gravia 1	17.13 km	(Argentina) Gabriel Pozzo	Mitsubishi Lancer Evo VI	14:08.8	(Argentina) Gabriel Pozzo
Leg 2 (16 Jun)	SS12	Inohori 2	23.00 km	(Argentina) Gabriel Pozzo	Mitsubishi Lancer Evo VI	19:35.2	(Argentina) Gabriel Pozzo
Leg 2 (16 Jun)	SS13	Karoutes 2	18.89 km	(Argentina) Gabriel Pozzo	Mitsubishi Lancer Evo VI	13:17.0	(Argentina) Gabriel Pozzo
Leg 3 (17 Jun)	SS14	Amfiklia 1	8.25 km	(Uruguay) Gustavo Trelles	Mitsubishi Lancer Evo VI	5:17.9	(Argentina) Gabriel Pozzo
Leg 3 (17 Jun)	SS15	Elatia — Rengini 1	38.69 km	(Uruguay) Gustavo Trelles	Mitsubishi Lancer Evo VI	27:36.0	(Argentina) Gabriel Pozzo
Leg 3 (17 Jun)	SS16	Livadia 2	11.66 km	(Uruguay) Gustavo Trelles	Mitsubishi Lancer Evo VI	9:56.9	(Argentina) Gabriel Pozzo
Leg 3 (17 Jun)	SS17	Stiri 2	3.59 km	(Argentina) Gabriel Pozzo	Mitsubishi Lancer Evo VI	2:05.0	(Argentina) Gabriel Pozzo
Leg 3 (17 Jun)	SS18	Gravia 2	17.13 km	(Argentina) Gabriel Pozzo	Mitsubishi Lancer Evo VI	14:00.9	(Argentina) Gabriel Pozzo
Leg 3 (17 Jun)	SS19	Amfiklia 2	8.25 km	(Uruguay) Gustavo Trelles	Mitsubishi Lancer Evo VI	5:17.0	(Argentina) Gabriel Pozzo
Leg 3 (17 Jun)	SS20	Elatia — Rengini 2	38.69 km	(Argentina) Gabriel Pozzo	Mitsubishi Lancer Evo VI	27:33.0	(Argentina) Gabriel Pozzo

==== Championship standings ====
Pos.	Drivers' championships		
Pos.	Move	Driver	Points
1		(Argentina) Gabriel Pozzo	37
2		(Uruguay) Gustavo Trelles	26
3		(Austria) Manfred Stohl	12
4		(Switzerland) Olivier Gillet	10
5		(Sweden) Stig-Olov Walfridsson	10

=== FIA Cup for Super 1600 Drivers ===
==== Classification ====
Position		No.	Driver	Co-driver	Entrant	Car	Time	Difference	Points
Event	Class	No.	Driver	Co-driver	Entrant	Car	Time	Difference	Points
19	1	53	(France) Sébastien Loeb	(Monaco) Daniel Elena	(France) Citroën Sport	Citroën Saxo S1600	5:00:51.9		10
20	2	52	(Italy) Andrea Dallavilla	(Italy) Massimo Chiapponi	(Italy) R&D Motorsport	Fiat Punto S1600	5:03:27.8	+2:35.9	6
24	3	63	(Norway) Martin Stenshorne	(United Kingdom) Clive Jenkins	(Norway) Zeta Racing	Ford Puma S1600	5:11:22.6	+10:30.7	4
26	4	57	(France) Cédric Robert	(France) Marie-Pierre Billoux	(France) Team Gamma	Peugeot 206 S1600	5:15:22.0	+14:30.1	3
28	5	51	(France) Patrick Magaud	(France) Guylène Brun	(United Kingdom) Ford Motor Co. Ltd.	Ford Puma S1600	5:15:41.7	+14:49.8	2
31	6	68	(Italy) Massimo Ceccato	(Italy) Mitia Dotta	(Italy) Hawk Racing Club	Fiat Punto S1600	5:20:13.9	+19:22.0	1
33	7	62	(Finland) Jussi Välimäki	(Finland) Jakke Honkanen	(Finland) ST Motors	Peugeot 206 S1600	5:21:03.6	+20:11.7	0
36	8	72	(Malaysia) Saladin Mazlan	(United Kingdom) Timothy Sturla	(Malaysia) Saladin Rallying	Ford Puma S1600	5:33:06.7	+32:14.8	0
Retired SS17		69	(France) Nicolas Bernardi	(France) Delphine Bernardi	(France) Team Gamma	Peugeot 206 S1600	Accident		0
Retired SS15		54	(Belgium) Larry Cols	(Belgium) Yasmine Gerard	(Belgium) Peugeot Bastos Racing	Peugeot 206 S1600	Accident		0
Retired SS15		55	(United Kingdom) Niall McShea	(United Kingdom) Michael Orr	(United Kingdom) Ford Motor Co. Ltd.	Ford Puma S1600	Electrical		0
Retired SS11		59	(France) Benoît Rousselot	(France) Gilles Mondésir	(United Kingdom) Ford Motor Co. Ltd.	Ford Puma S1600	Suspension		0
Retired SS9		65	(Paraguay) Alejandro Galanti	(Paraguay) Fernando Zuleta	(Italy) Astra Racing	Ford Puma S1600	Gearbox		0
Retired SS8		61	(Italy) Corrado Fontana	(Italy) Renzo Casazza	(Italy) H.F. Grifone SRL	Peugeot 206 S1600	Transmission		0
Retired SS8		71	(Belgium) François Duval	(Belgium) Jean-Marc Fortin	(United Kingdom) Ford Motor Co. Ltd.	Ford Puma S1600	Suspension		0
Retired SS4		60	(Switzerland) Cyril Henny	(Switzerland) Aurore Maëder-Brand	(Switzerland) Rally Team Henny	Citroën Saxo S1600	Engine		0
Retired SS3		64	(Italy) Massimo Macaluso	(Italy) Antonio Celot	(Italy) R&D Motorsport	Fiat Punto S1600	Differential		0
Retired SS2		56	(Italy) Giandomenico Basso	(Italy) Flavio Guglielmini	(Italy) Top Run SRL	Fiat Punto S1600	Gearbox		0
Retired SS2		73	(Italy) Christian Chemin	(Italy) Matteo Alberto Bacchin	(Italy) Hawk Racing Club	Fiat Punto S1600	Suspension		0
Retired SS1		50	(Austria) Manfred Stohl	(Austria) Ilka Minor	(Italy) Top Run SRL	Fiat Punto S1600	Accident on road section		0
Retired SS1		58	(Spain) Sergio Vallejo	(Spain) Diego Vallejo	(Spain) Pronto Racing	Fiat Punto S1600	Suspension		0
Retired SS1		67	(Andorra) Albert Llovera	(Spain) Marc Corral	(Spain) Pronto Racing	Fiat Punto S1600	Mechanical		0

==== Special stages ====
Day	Stage	Stage name	Length	Winner	Car	Time	Class leaders
Leg 1 (15 Jun)	SS1	Mendenitsa 1	26.92 km	(Paraguay) Alejandro Galanti	Ford Puma S1600	22:49.2	(Paraguay) Alejandro Galanti
Leg 1 (15 Jun)	SS2	Paleohori	10.85 km	(France) Patrick Magaud	Ford Puma S1600	9:32.8	(Paraguay) Alejandro Galanti
Leg 1 (15 Jun)	SS3	Inohori 1	23.00 km	(France) Sébastien Loeb	Citroën Saxo S1600	20:04.0	(France) Patrick Magaud
Leg 1 (15 Jun)	SS4	Pavliani 1	24.45 km	(Italy) Andrea Dallavilla	Fiat Punto S1600	22:22.6	(France) Patrick Magaud
Leg 1 (15 Jun)	SS5	Elatia	31.40 km	Stage cancelled			(France) Patrick Magaud
Leg 1 (15 Jun)	SS6	Mendenitsa 2	26.92 km	(Belgium) François Duval	Ford Puma S1600	23:53.0	(Belgium) François Duval
Leg 2 (16 Jun)	SS7	Pavliani 2	24.45 km	(France) Sébastien Loeb	Citroën Saxo S1600	22:10.3	(Belgium) François Duval
Leg 2 (16 Jun)	SS8	Karoutes 1	18.89 km	(France) Sébastien Loeb	Citroën Saxo S1600	13:37.6	(France) Sébastien Loeb
Leg 2 (16 Jun)	SS9	Livadia 1	11.66 km	(Italy) Andrea Dallavilla	Fiat Punto S1600	10:35.9	(France) Sébastien Loeb
Leg 2 (16 Jun)	SS10	Stiri 1	3.59 km	(Italy) Andrea Dallavilla	Fiat Punto S1600	2:16.3	(France) Sébastien Loeb
Leg 2 (16 Jun)	SS11	Gravia 1	17.13 km	(Italy) Andrea Dallavilla	Fiat Punto S1600	14:40.2	(France) Sébastien Loeb
Leg 2 (16 Jun)	SS12	Inohori 2	23.00 km	(Italy) Andrea Dallavilla	Fiat Punto S1600	20:29.1	(France) Sébastien Loeb
Leg 2 (16 Jun)	SS13	Karoutes 2	18.89 km	(France) Sébastien Loeb	Citroën Saxo S1600	13:38.4	(France) Sébastien Loeb
Leg 3 (17 Jun)	SS14	Amfiklia 1	8.25 km	(France) Sébastien Loeb	Citroën Saxo S1600	5:44.2	(France) Sébastien Loeb
Leg 3 (17 Jun)	SS15	Elatia — Rengini 1	38.69 km	(France) Sébastien Loeb	Citroën Saxo S1600	29:20.0	(France) Sébastien Loeb
Leg 3 (17 Jun)	SS16	Livadia 2	11.66 km	(Italy) Andrea Dallavilla	Fiat Punto S1600	10:50.4	(France) Sébastien Loeb
Leg 3 (17 Jun)	SS17	Stiri 2	3.59 km	(France) Sébastien Loeb	Citroën Saxo S1600	2:19.2	(France) Sébastien Loeb
Leg 3 (17 Jun)	SS18	Gravia 2	17.13 km	(France) Sébastien Loeb	Citroën Saxo S1600	14:52.9	(France) Sébastien Loeb
Leg 3 (17 Jun)	SS19	Amfiklia 2	8.25 km	(France) Patrick Magaud	Ford Puma S1600	5:47.7	(France) Sébastien Loeb
Leg 3 (17 Jun)	SS20	Elatia — Rengini 2	38.69 km	(Italy) Massimo Ceccato	Fiat Punto S1600	30:06.8	(France) Sébastien Loeb

==== Championship standings ====
Pos.	Drivers' championships		
Pos.	Move	Driver	Points
1		(France) Sébastien Loeb	20
2	3	(Italy) Andrea Dallavilla	8
3	1	(Norway) Martin Stenshorne	7
4	2	(Italy) Giandomenico Basso	6
5	2	(Italy) Corrado Fontana	4
