= 2000 Safari Rally =

3rd round of the 2000 World Rally Championship

2000 Safari Rally 48th Sameer Safari Rally Kenya
Round 3 of the 2000 World Rally Championship season
← Previous event	Next event →
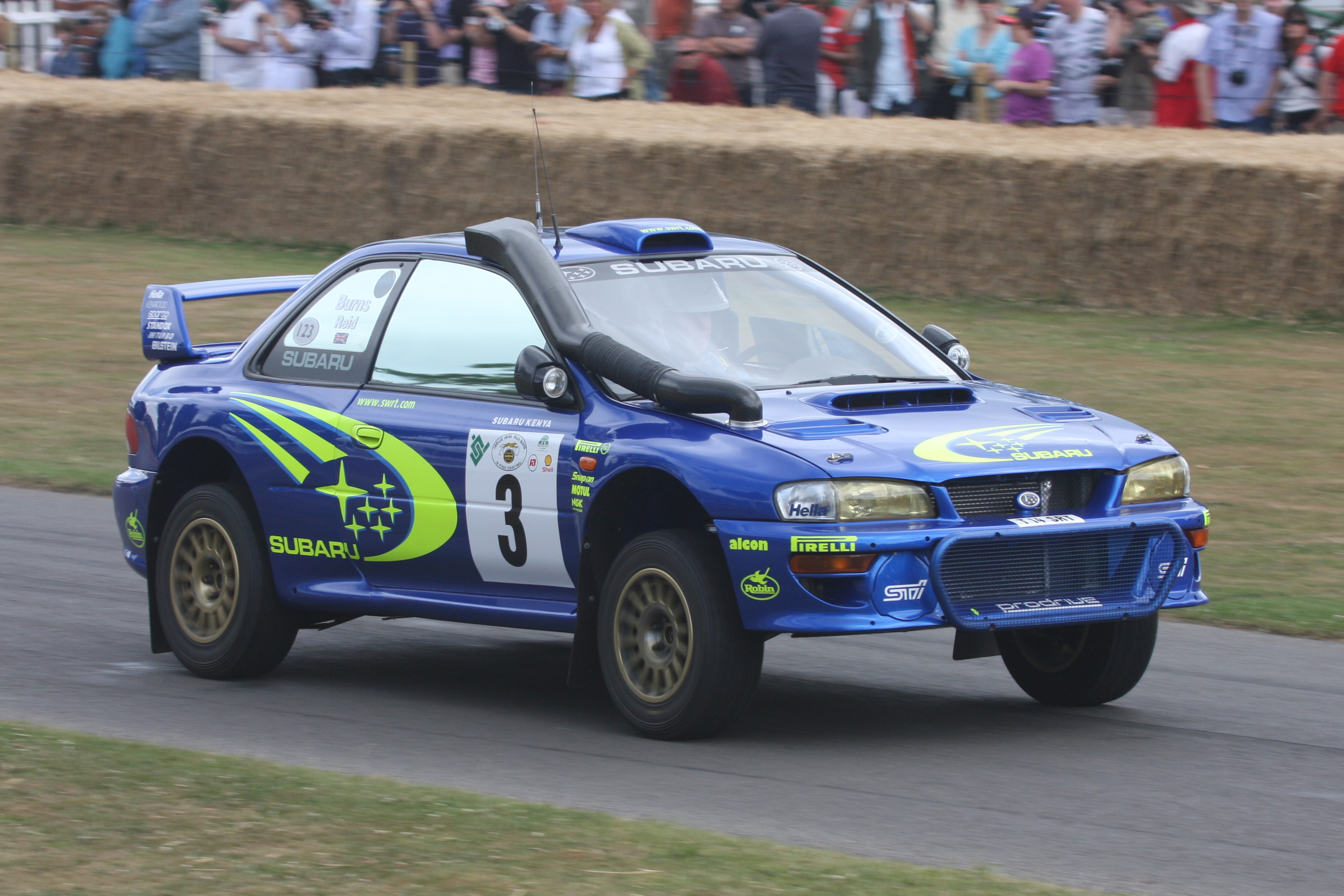
- Rally winner Richard Burns
- Host country: Kenya
- Rally base: Nairobi
- Dates run: February 25 2000 – February 27 2000
- Stages: 12 (1,047.26 km; 650.74 miles)
- Stage surface: Gravel
- Overall distance: 2,677.11 km (1,663.48 miles)

Statistics
- Crews: 51 at start, 17 at finish

Overall results
- Overall winner: (United Kingdom) Richard Burns (United Kingdom) Robert Reid (Japan) Subaru World Rally Team; Subaru Impreza S5 WRC '99

The 2000 Safari Rally (formally the 48th Sameer Safari Rally Kenya) was the third round of the 2000 World Rally Championship. The race was held over three days between 25 February and 27 February 2000, and was won by Subaru's Richard Burns, his 6th win in the World Rally Championship. Juha Kankkunen made it 1-2 for Subaru and Didier Auriol took SEAT's first (and only) podium of the season being third

== Background ==
=== Entry list ===
No.	Driver	Co-Driver	Entrant	Car	Tyre
World Rally Championship manufacturer entries
1	(Finland) Tommi Mäkinen	(Finland) Risto Mannisenmäki	(Japan) Marlboro Mitsubishi Ralliart	Mitsubishi Lancer Evo VI	MI
2	(Belgium) Freddy Loix	(Belgium) Sven Smeets	(Japan) Marlboro Mitsubishi Ralliart	Mitsubishi Carisma GT Evo VI	MI
3	(United Kingdom) Richard Burns	(United Kingdom) Robert Reid	(Japan) Subaru World Rally Team	Subaru Impreza S5 WRC '99	P
4	(Finland) Juha Kankkunen	(Finland) Juha Repo	(Japan) Subaru World Rally Team	Subaru Impreza S5 WRC '99	P
5	(United Kingdom) Colin McRae	(United Kingdom) Nicky Grist	(United Kingdom) Ford Motor Co. Ltd.	Ford Focus RS WRC '00	MI
6	(Spain) Carlos Sainz	(Spain) Luis Moya	(United Kingdom) Ford Motor Co. Ltd.	Ford Focus RS WRC '00	MI
7	(France) Didier Auriol	(France) Denis Giraudet	(Spain) SEAT Sport	SEAT Córdoba WRC Evo2	P
8	(Finland) Toni Gardemeister	(Finland) Paavo Lukander	(Spain) SEAT Sport	SEAT Córdoba WRC Evo2	P
9	(France) Gilles Panizzi	(France) Hervé Panizzi	(France) Peugeot Esso	Peugeot 206 WRC	MI
10	(Finland) Marcus Grönholm	(Finland) Timo Rautiainen	(France) Peugeot Esso	Peugeot 206 WRC	MI
11	(Germany) Armin Schwarz	(Germany) Manfred Hiemer	(Czech Republic) Škoda Motorsport	Škoda Octavia WRC	MI
12	(Spain) Luis Climent Asensio	(Spain) Álex Romaní	(Czech Republic) Škoda Motorsport	Škoda Octavia WRC	MI
World Rally Championship entries
16	(Norway) Petter Solberg	(United Kingdom) Phil Mills	(United Kingdom) Ford Motor Co. Ltd.	Ford Focus RS WRC '00	MI
17	(Japan) Toshihiro Arai	(United Kingdom) Roger Freeman	(Japan) Spike Subaru Team	Subaru Impreza S5 WRC '99	—N/a
18	(France) Frédéric Dor	(France) Didier Breton	(France) F. Dor Rally Team	Subaru Impreza S5 WRC '98	MI
23	(Kenya) Rory Green	(Kenya) Orson Taylor	(Kenya) Rory Green	Subaru Impreza 555	—N/a
24	(Kenya) Paul Bailey	(Kenya) Raju Sehmi	(Kenya) Paul Bailey	Toyota Celica GT-Four	—N/a
28	(Kenya) Rob Hellier	(United Kingdom) Des Page-Morris	(Kenya) Rob Hellier	Mitsubishi Lancer Evo III	—N/a
29	(United Kingdom) John Lloyd	(United Kingdom) Adrian Cavenagh	(United Kingdom) John Lloyd	Mitsubishi Lancer Evo IV	—N/a
39	(Kenya) Michelle van Tongeren	(Kenya) Safina Hussein	(Kenya) Michelle van Tongeren	Subaru Impreza WRX	—N/a
45	(Kenya) Don Smith	(Kenya) Adrian Wroe	(Kenya) Don Smith	Ford Escort RS Cosworth	—N/a
Group N Cup entries
19	(Austria) Manfred Stohl	(Austria) Peter Müller	(Austria) Manfred Stohl	Mitsubishi Lancer Evo VI	P
20	(Japan) Shigeyuki Konishi	(Australia) Glenn Macneall	(Japan) Shigeyuki Konishi	Subaru Impreza WRX	—N/a
21	(United Kingdom) Alastair Cavenagh	(Kenya) Crispin Sassoon	(United Kingdom) Alastair Cavenagh	Subaru Impreza WRX	—N/a
22	(Argentina) Roberto Sanchez	(Argentina) Jorge Del Buono	(Argentina) Roberto Sanchez	Subaru Impreza WRX	—N/a
25	(United Kingdom) Richard Tuthill	(Kenya) Peter Stone	(United Kingdom) Richard Tuthill	Subaru Impreza	—N/a
27	(Kenya) Azar Anwar	(Kenya) Farakh Yusuf	(Kenya) Azar Anwar	Mitsubishi Lancer Evo VI	—N/a
31	(Argentina) Claudio Marcelo Menzi	(Argentina) Edgardo Galindo	(Argentina) Claudio Marcelo Menzi	Mitsubishi Lancer Evo VI	P
32	(Malaysia) Saladin Mazlan	(Malaysia) Allen Oh	(Malaysia) Saladin Mazlan	Subaru Impreza WRX	—N/a
33	(Austria) Rudolf Stohl	(Austria) Ilka Minor	(Austria) Rudolf Stohl	Mitsubishi Lancer Evo VI	P
34	(Kenya) Hardeep Rehsi	(Kenya) Kamaljeet Ubhi	(Kenya) Hardeep Rehsi	Subaru Impreza WRX	—N/a
35	(Kenya) Phineas Kimathi	(Kenya) Abdul Sidi	(Kenya) Phineas Kimathi	Subaru Impreza WRX	—N/a
36	(Kenya) Shaheed Wissanji	(Kenya) Mohammed Verjee	(Kenya) Shaheed Wissanji	Subaru Impreza WRX	—N/a
37	(Argentina) Gabriel Pozzo	(Argentina) Rodolfo Amelio Ortiz	(Argentina) Gabriel Pozzo	Mitsubishi Lancer Evo VI	—N/a
38	(United Kingdom) Ron Oakeley	(United Kingdom) Jamie Turner	(United Kingdom) Ron Oakeley	Subaru Impreza 555	—N/a
40	(Kenya) Jamil Khan	(Kenya) Bill Kirk	(Kenya) Jamil Khan	Subaru Impreza WRX	—N/a
41	(Kenya) John Ngunjiri	(Kenya) Thuita Karanja	(Kenya) John Ngunjiri	Subaru Impreza WRX	—N/a
42	(Kenya) Shabir Hussein	(Kenya) Tom Muriuki	(Kenya) Shabir Hussein	Subaru Legacy RS	—N/a
43	(Zimbabwe) Abe Smit	(Zimbabwe) Tony Rowley	(Zimbabwe) Abe Smit	Volkswagen Golf TDI	—N/a
48	(Austria) Stefan Reininger	(Austria) Erich Widhalm	(Austria) Stefan Reininger	Honda Civic VTi	—N/a
49	(Japan) Kozue Oi	(Japan) Hiroko Takahashi	(Japan) Kozue Oi	Subaru Forester	—N/a
50	(Kenya) Jonathan Jackson	(Kenya) Shabir Haji	(Kenya) Jonathan Jackson	Subaru Impreza	—N/a
54	(Kenya) Brendan Fernandes	(Kenya) Tony Kimondo	(Kenya) Brendan Fernandes	Subaru Impreza WRX	—N/a
55	(Kenya) Shahid Essajee	(Kenya) Shammi Singh	(Kenya) Shahid Essajee	Mitsubishi Lancer Evo II	—N/a

=== Itinerary ===
All dates and times are EAT (UTC+3).

Date	Time	No.	Stage name	Distance
Leg 1 — 350.84 km
25 February	11:28	SS1	Orien 1	112.43 km
25 February	13:34	SS2	Oltepesi 1	116.92 km
25 February	15:58	SS3	Olorian 1	71.40 km
25 February	16:43	SS4	Kajiado 1	50.09 km
Leg 2 — 345.58 km
26 February	07:44	SS5	Marigat	123.21 km
26 February	10:15	SS6	Nyaru	68.64 km
26 February	13:38	SS7	Morendat	93.81 km
26 February	16:12	SS8	Marigat	59.92 km
Leg 3 — 350.84 km
27 February	07:08	SS9	Orien 2	112.43 km
27 February	09:14	SS10	Oltepesi 2	116.92 km
27 February	11:43	SS11	Olorian 2	71.40 km
27 February	12:28	SS12	Kajiado 2	50.09 km

== Results ==
=== Overall ===
Pos.	No.	Driver	Co-driver	Team	Car	Time	Difference	Points
1	3	(United Kingdom) Richard Burns	(United Kingdom) Robert Reid	(Japan) Subaru World Rally Team	Subaru Impreza S5 WRC '99	8:33:13		10
2	4	(Finland) Juha Kankkunen	(Finland) Juha Repo	(Japan) Subaru World Rally Team	Subaru Impreza S5 WRC '99	8:37:50	+4:37	6
3	7	(France) Didier Auriol	(France) Denis Giraudet	(Spain) SEAT Sport	SEAT Córdoba WRC Evo2	8:55:57	+22:44	4
4	6	(Spain) Carlos Sainz	(Spain) Luis Moya	(United Kingdom) Ford Motor Co. Ltd.	Ford Focus RS WRC '00	9:01:31	+28:18	3
5	16	(Norway) Petter Solberg	(United Kingdom) Phil Mills	(United Kingdom) Ford Motor Co. Ltd.	Ford Focus RS WRC '00	9:04:40	+31:27	2
6	17	(Japan) Toshihiro Arai	(United Kingdom) Roger Freeman	(Japan) Spike Subaru Team	Subaru Impreza S5 WRC '99	9:19:16	+46:03	1

=== World Rally Cars ===
==== Classification ====
Position		No.	Driver	Co-driver	Entrant	Car	Time	Difference	Points
Event	Class	No.	Driver	Co-driver	Entrant	Car	Time	Difference	Points
1	1	3	(United Kingdom) Richard Burns	(United Kingdom) Robert Reid	(Japan) Subaru World Rally Team	Subaru Impreza S5 WRC '99	8:33:13		10
2	2	4	(Finland) Juha Kankkunen	(Finland) Juha Repo	(Japan) Subaru World Rally Team	Subaru Impreza S5 WRC '99	8:37:50	+4:37	6
3	3	7	(France) Didier Auriol	(France) Denis Giraudet	(Spain) SEAT Sport	SEAT Córdoba WRC Evo2	8:55:57	+22:44	4
4	4	6	(Spain) Carlos Sainz	(Spain) Luis Moya	(United Kingdom) Ford Motor Co. Ltd.	Ford Focus RS WRC '00	9:01:31	+28:18	3
7	5	11	(Germany) Armin Schwarz	(Germany) Manfred Hiemer	(Czech Republic) Škoda Motorsport	Škoda Octavia WRC	9:32:11	+58:58	0
8	6	12	(Spain) Luis Climent Asensio	(Spain) Álex Romaní	(Czech Republic) Škoda Motorsport	Škoda Octavia WRC	9:51:13	+1:18:00	0
Retired SS8		5	(United Kingdom) Colin McRae	(United Kingdom) Nicky Grist	(United Kingdom) Ford Motor Co. Ltd.	Ford Focus RS WRC '00	Engine		0
Retired SS8		10	(Finland) Marcus Grönholm	(Finland) Timo Rautiainen	(France) Peugeot Esso	Peugeot 206 WRC	Clutch		0
Retired SS7		2	(Belgium) Freddy Loix	(Belgium) Sven Smeets	(Japan) Marlboro Mitsubishi Ralliart	Mitsubishi Carisma GT Evo VI	Mechanical		0
Retired SS5		9	(France) Gilles Panizzi	(France) Hervé Panizzi	(France) Peugeot Esso	Peugeot 206 WRC	Suspension		0
Retired SS3		1	(Finland) Tommi Mäkinen	(Finland) Risto Mannisenmäki	(Japan) Marlboro Mitsubishi Ralliart	Mitsubishi Lancer Evo VI	Suspension		0
Retired SS3		8	(Finland) Toni Gardemeister	(Finland) Paavo Lukander	(Spain) SEAT Sport	SEAT Córdoba WRC Evo2	Codriver ill		0

==== Special stages ====
Day	Stage	Stage name	Length	Winner	Car	Time	Class leaders
Leg 1 (25 Feb)	SS1	Orien 1	112.43 km	(France) Didier Auriol	SEAT Córdoba WRC Evo2	47:13	(France) Didier Auriol
Leg 1 (25 Feb)	SS2	Oltepesi 1	116.92 km	(United Kingdom) Richard Burns	Subaru Impreza S5 WRC '99	54:06	(United Kingdom) Richard Burns
Leg 1 (25 Feb)	SS3	Olorian 1	71.40 km	(United Kingdom) Richard Burns	Subaru Impreza S5 WRC '99	35:04	(United Kingdom) Richard Burns
Leg 1 (25 Feb)	SS4	Kajiado 1	50.09 km	(United Kingdom) Richard Burns	Subaru Impreza S5 WRC '99	23:44	(United Kingdom) Richard Burns
Leg 2 (26 Feb)	SS5	Marigat	123.21 km	(United Kingdom) Richard Burns	Subaru Impreza S5 WRC '99	1:00:04	(United Kingdom) Richard Burns
Leg 2 (26 Feb)	SS6	Nyaru	68.64 km	(Spain) Carlos Sainz	Ford Focus RS WRC '00	46:15	(United Kingdom) Richard Burns
Leg 2 (26 Feb)	SS7	Morendat	93.81 km	(Spain) Carlos Sainz	Ford Focus RS WRC '00	46:03	(United Kingdom) Richard Burns
Leg 2 (26 Feb)	SS8	Marigat	59.92 km	(Spain) Carlos Sainz	Ford Focus RS WRC '00	27:55	(United Kingdom) Richard Burns
Leg 3 (27 Feb)	SS9	Orien 2	112.43 km	(France) Didier Auriol	SEAT Córdoba WRC Evo2	47:54	(United Kingdom) Richard Burns
Leg 3 (27 Feb)	SS10	Oltepesi 2	116.92 km	(United Kingdom) Richard Burns	Subaru Impreza S5 WRC '99	56:11	(United Kingdom) Richard Burns
Leg 3 (27 Feb)	SS11	Olorian 2	71.40 km	(Spain) Carlos Sainz	Ford Focus RS WRC '00	34:48	(United Kingdom) Richard Burns
Leg 3 (27 Feb)	SS12	Kajiado 2	50.09 km	(Spain) Carlos Sainz	Ford Focus RS WRC '00	23:18	(United Kingdom) Richard Burns

==== Championship standings ====
Pos.	Drivers' championships			Co-drivers' championships			Manufacturers' championships		
Pos.	Move	Driver	Points	Move	Co-driver	Points	Move	Manufacturer	Points
1		(Finland) Tommi Mäkinen	16		(Finland) Risto Mannisenmäki	16	3	(Japan) Subaru World Rally Team	25
2	7	(United Kingdom) Richard Burns	12	7	(United Kingdom) Robert Reid	12	1	(Japan) Marlboro Mitsubishi Ralliart	18
3	1	(Finland) Juha Kankkunen	11	1	(Finland) Juha Repo	11		(United Kingdom) Ford Motor Co. Ltd.	13
4	2	(Finland) Marcus Grönholm	10	2	(Finland) Timo Rautiainen	10	2	(France) Peugeot Esso	11
5	2	(Spain) Carlos Sainz	9	2	(Spain) Luis Moya	9		(Spain) SEAT Sport	7

=== FIA Cup for Production Rally Drivers ===
==== Classification ====
Position		No.	Driver	Co-driver	Entrant	Car	Time	Difference	Points
Event	Class	No.	Driver	Co-driver	Entrant	Car	Time	Difference	Points
9	1	31	(Argentina) Claudio Marcelo Menzi	(Argentina) Edgardo Galindo	(Argentina) Claudio Marcelo Menzi	Mitsubishi Lancer Evo VI	10:39:07		10
10	2	22	(Argentina) Roberto Sanchez	(Argentina) Jorge Del Buono	(Argentina) Roberto Sanchez	Subaru Impreza WRX	10:57:05	+17:58	6
11	3	19	(Austria) Manfred Stohl	(Austria) Peter Müller	(Austria) Manfred Stohl	Mitsubishi Lancer Evo VI	11:02:53	+23:46	4
13	4	32	(Malaysia) Saladin Mazlan	(Malaysia) Allen Oh	(Malaysia) Saladin Mazlan	Subaru Impreza WRX	12:08:38	+1:29:31	3
14	5	35	(Kenya) Phineas Kimathi	(Kenya) Abdul Sidi	(Kenya) Phineas Kimathi	Subaru Impreza WRX	12:16:29	+1:37:22	2
15	6	36	(Kenya) Shaheed Wissanji	(Kenya) Mohammed Verjee	(Kenya) Shaheed Wissanji	Subaru Impreza WRX	13:41:12	+3:02:05	1
17	7	55	(Kenya) Shahid Essajee	(Kenya) Shammi Singh	(Kenya) Shahid Essajee	Mitsubishi Lancer Evo II	16:06:42	+5:27:35	0
Retired SS9		40	(Kenya) Jamil Khan	(Kenya) Bill Kirk	(Kenya) Jamil Khan	Subaru Impreza WRX	Retired		0
Retired SS5		27	(Kenya) Azar Anwar	(Kenya) Farakh Yusuf	(Kenya) Azar Anwar	Mitsubishi Lancer Evo VI	Retired		0
Retired SS5		33	(Austria) Rudolf Stohl	(Austria) Ilka Minor	(Austria) Rudolf Stohl	Mitsubishi Lancer Evo VI	Retired		0
Retired SS5		41	(Kenya) John Ngunjiri	(Kenya) Thuita Karanja	(Kenya) John Ngunjiri	Subaru Impreza WRX	Retired		0
Retired SS5		50	(Kenya) Jonathan Jackson	(Kenya) Shabir Haji	(Kenya) Jonathan Jackson	Subaru Impreza	Mechanical		0
Retired SS4		37	(Argentina) Gabriel Pozzo	(Argentina) Rodolfo Amelio Ortiz	(Argentina) Gabriel Pozzo	Mitsubishi Lancer Evo VI	Suspension		0
Retired SS4		38	(United Kingdom) Ron Oakeley	(United Kingdom) Jamie Turner	(United Kingdom) Ron Oakeley	Subaru Impreza 555	Mechanical		0
Retired SS3		20	(Japan) Shigeyuki Konishi	(Australia) Glenn Macneall	(Japan) Shigeyuki Konishi	Subaru Impreza WRX	Engine		0
Retired SS3		25	(United Kingdom) Richard Tuthill	(Kenya) Peter Stone	(United Kingdom) Richard Tuthill	Subaru Impreza	Mechanical		0
Retired SS3		43	(Zimbabwe) Abe Smit	(Zimbabwe) Tony Rowley	(Zimbabwe) Abe Smit	Volkswagen Golf TDI	Mechanical		0
Retired SS3		54	(Kenya) Brendan Fernandes	(Kenya) Tony Kimondo	(Kenya) Brendan Fernandes	Subaru Impreza WRX	Mechanical		0
Retired SS2		34	(Kenya) Hardeep Rehsi	(Kenya) Kamaljeet Ubhi	(Kenya) Hardeep Rehsi	Subaru Impreza WRX	Mechanical		0
Retired SS2		42	(Kenya) Shabir Hussein	(Kenya) Tom Muriuki	(Kenya) Shabir Hussein	Subaru Legacy RS	Over time limit		0
Retired SS2		48	(Austria) Stefan Reininger	(Austria) Erich Widhalm	(Austria) Stefan Reininger	Honda Civic VTi	Engine		0
Retired SS1		21	(United Kingdom) Alastair Cavenagh	(Kenya) Crispin Sassoon	(United Kingdom) Alastair Cavenagh	Subaru Impreza WRX	Engine		0
Retired SS1		49	(Japan) Kozue Oi	(Japan) Hiroko Takahashi	(Japan) Kozue Oi	Subaru Forester	Accident		0

==== Special stages ====
Day	Stage	Stage name	Length	Winner	Car	Time	Class leaders
Leg 1 (25 Feb)	SS1	Orien 1	112.43 km	(Argentina) Gabriel Pozzo	Mitsubishi Lancer Evo VI	55:07	(Argentina) Gabriel Pozzo
Leg 1 (25 Feb)	SS2	Oltepesi 1	116.92 km	(Argentina) Gabriel Pozzo	Mitsubishi Lancer Evo VI	1:05:49	(Argentina) Gabriel Pozzo
Leg 1 (25 Feb)	SS3	Olorian 1	71.40 km	(Argentina) Gabriel Pozzo	Mitsubishi Lancer Evo VI	44:37	(Argentina) Gabriel Pozzo
Leg 1 (25 Feb)	SS4	Kajiado 1	50.09 km	(Argentina) Claudio Marcelo Menzi	Mitsubishi Lancer Evo VI	29:00	(Argentina) Claudio Marcelo Menzi
Leg 2 (26 Feb)	SS5	Marigat	123.21 km	(Argentina) Claudio Marcelo Menzi (Austria) Manfred Stohl	Mitsubishi Lancer Evo VI; Mitsubishi Lancer Evo VI	1:12:44	(Argentina) Claudio Marcelo Menzi
Leg 2 (26 Feb)	SS6	Nyaru	68.64 km	(Argentina) Claudio Marcelo Menzi	Mitsubishi Lancer Evo VI	54:47	(Argentina) Claudio Marcelo Menzi
Leg 2 (26 Feb)	SS7	Morendat	93.81 km	(Argentina) Roberto Sanchez	Subaru Impreza WRX	1:02:25	(Argentina) Claudio Marcelo Menzi
Leg 2 (26 Feb)	SS8	Marigat	59.92 km	(Austria) Manfred Stohl	Mitsubishi Lancer Evo VI	35:46	(Argentina) Claudio Marcelo Menzi
Leg 3 (27 Feb)	SS9	Orien 2	112.43 km	(Argentina) Claudio Marcelo Menzi	Mitsubishi Lancer Evo VI	57:42	(Argentina) Claudio Marcelo Menzi
Leg 3 (27 Feb)	SS10	Oltepesi 2	116.92 km	(Argentina) Claudio Marcelo Menzi	Mitsubishi Lancer Evo VI	1:09:57	(Argentina) Claudio Marcelo Menzi
Leg 3 (27 Feb)	SS11	Olorian 2	71.40 km	(Austria) Manfred Stohl	Mitsubishi Lancer Evo VI	48:05	(Argentina) Claudio Marcelo Menzi
Leg 3 (27 Feb)	SS12	Kajiado 2	50.09 km	(Austria) Manfred Stohl	Mitsubishi Lancer Evo VI	30:34	(Argentina) Claudio Marcelo Menzi

==== Championship standings ====
Pos.	Drivers' championships		
Pos.	Move	Driver	Points
1		(Austria) Manfred Stohl	17
2		(Finland) Jani Paasonen	10
3	New entry	(Argentina) Claudio Marcelo Menzi	10
4	1	(Uruguay) Gustavo Trelles	6
5	1	(Finland) Juuso Pykälistö	6
