= 2001 Rallye de Portugal =

3rd round of the 2001 World Rally Championship

2001 Rally de Portugal 35th TAP Rallye de Portugal
Round 3 of the 2001 World Rally Championship season
← Previous event	Next event →
- Host country: Portugal
- Rally base: Matosinhos
- Dates run: March 8, 2001 – March 11, 2001
- Stages: 22 (390.72 km; 242.78 miles)
- Stage surface: Gravel
- Overall distance: 1,705.21 km (1,059.57 miles)

Statistics
- Crews: 94 at start, 24 at finish

Overall results
- Overall winner: (Finland) Tommi Mäkinen (Finland) Risto Mannisenmäki (Japan) Marlboro Mitsubishi Ralliart; Mitsubishi Lancer Evo 6.5

The 2001 Rally de Portugal (formally the 35th TAP Rallye de Portugal) was the third round of the 2001 World Rally Championship. The race was held over four days between 8 March and 11 March 2001, and was won by Mitsubishi's Tommi Mäkinen, his 22nd win in the World Rally Championship.

== Background ==
=== Entry list ===
No.	Driver	Co-Driver	Entrant	Car	Tyre
World Rally Championship manufacturer entries
1	(Finland) Marcus Grönholm	(Finland) Timo Rautiainen	(France) Peugeot Total	Peugeot 206 WRC	M
2	(France) Didier Auriol	(France) Denis Giraudet	(France) Peugeot Total	Peugeot 206 WRC	M
3	(Spain) Carlos Sainz	(Spain) Luis Moya	(United Kingdom) Ford Motor Co. Ltd.	Ford Focus RS WRC '01	P
4	(United Kingdom) Colin McRae	(United Kingdom) Nicky Grist	(United Kingdom) Ford Motor Co. Ltd.	Ford Focus RS WRC '01	P
5	(United Kingdom) Richard Burns	(United Kingdom) Robert Reid	(Japan) Subaru World Rally Team	Subaru Impreza S7 WRC '01	P
6	(Norway) Petter Solberg	(United Kingdom) Phil Mills	(Japan) Subaru World Rally Team	Subaru Impreza S7 WRC '01	P
7	(Finland) Tommi Mäkinen	(Finland) Risto Mannisenmäki	(Japan) Marlboro Mitsubishi Ralliart	Mitsubishi Lancer Evo 6.5	M
8	(Belgium) Freddy Loix	(Belgium) Sven Smeets	(Japan) Marlboro Mitsubishi Ralliart	Mitsubishi Carisma GT Evo VI	M
9	(Sweden) Kenneth Eriksson	(Sweden) Staffan Parmander	(South Korea) Hyundai Castrol World Rally Team	Hyundai Accent WRC2	M
10	(United Kingdom) Alister McRae	(United Kingdom) David Senior	(South Korea) Hyundai Castrol World Rally Team	Hyundai Accent WRC2	M
11	(Germany) Armin Schwarz	(Germany) Manfred Hiemer	(Czech Republic) Škoda Motorsport	Škoda Octavia WRC Evo2	M
12	(Belgium) Bruno Thiry	(Belgium) Stéphane Prévot	(Czech Republic) Škoda Motorsport	Škoda Octavia WRC Evo2	M
World Rally Championship entries
16	(Finland) Harri Rovanperä	(Finland) Risto Pietiläinen	(France) Peugeot Total	Peugeot 206 WRC	M
17	(France) François Delecour	(France) Daniel Grataloup	(United Kingdom) Ford Motor Co. Ltd.	Ford Focus RS WRC '01	P
18	(Estonia) Markko Märtin	(United Kingdom) Michael Park	(Japan) Subaru World Rally Team	Subaru Impreza S7 WRC '01	P
19	(Japan) Toshihiro Arai	(Australia) Glenn Macneall	(Japan) Subaru World Rally Team	Subaru Impreza S7 WRC '01	P
20	(France) Gilles Panizzi	(France) Hervé Panizzi	(France) H.F. Grifone SRL	Peugeot 206 WRC	M
21	(Denmark) Henrik Lundgaard	(Denmark) Jens-Christian Anker	Toyota Castrol Team Denmark	Toyota Corolla WRC	—N/a
22	(Portugal) Pedro Matos Chaves	(Portugal) Sérgio Paiva	(Portugal) Telecel/Vodafone Castrol Team	Toyota Corolla WRC	—N/a
23	(Portugal) Adruzilo Lopes	(Portugal) Luís Lisboa	(Portugal) Peugeot Esso Silver Team SG	Peugeot 206 WRC	—N/a
24	(Portugal) Rui Madeira	(Portugal) Fernando Prata	(Portugal) Ford Galp Racing	Ford Focus RS WRC '01	—N/a
25	(Finland) Tapio Laukkanen	(Finland) Kaj Lindström	(Finland) Tapio Laukkanen	Toyota Corolla WRC	M
26	(Sweden) Daniel Carlsson	(Sweden) Benny Melander	(Sweden) Daniel Carlsson	Toyota Corolla WRC	—N/a
27	(Finland) Pasi Hagström	(Finland) Tero Gardemeister	Toyota Castrol Finland	Toyota Corolla WRC	—N/a
28	(Greece) Ioannis Papadimitriou	(United Kingdom) Chris Patterson	(Greece) Ioannis Papadimitriou	Peugeot 206 WRC	—N/a
29	(Saudi Arabia) Abdullah Bakhashab	(United Kingdom) Bobby Willis	Marlboro Rally Team Saudi Arabia	Toyota Corolla WRC	M
30	(Norway) Henning Solberg	(Norway) Ola Fløene	(Norway) Henning Solberg	Toyota Corolla WRC	—N/a
31	(Poland) Janusz Kulig	(Poland) Jarosław Baran	(Poland) Marlboro Ford Mobil 1 Team	Ford Focus RS WRC '00	—N/a
32	(Oman) Hamed Al-Wahaibi	(New Zealand) Tony Sircombe	Oman Arab World Rally Team	Subaru Impreza S6 WRC '00	—N/a
33	(Poland) Leszek Kuzaj	(Poland) Maciej Baran	(Poland) Leszek Kuzaj	Toyota Corolla WRC	—N/a
34	(France) Frédéric Dor	(France) Didier Breton	(France) F. Dor Rally Team	Subaru Impreza S6 WRC '00	—N/a
35	(Spain) Marc Blázquez	(Spain) Jordi Mercader	(Spain) Seat Sport	Seat Cordoba WRC Evo3	—N/a
36	(Belgium) Kris Princen	(Belgium) Dany Colebunders	(Belgium) Peugeot Bastos Racing	Peugeot 206 WRC	—N/a
38	(United Kingdom) Nigel Heath	(United Kingdom) Steve Lancaster	(United Kingdom) World Rally HIRE	Subaru Impreza S5 WRC '99	—N/a
49	(United Kingdom) John Lloyd	(United Kingdom) Paul Amandini	(United Kingdom) John Lloyd	Subaru Impreza 555	—N/a
50	(United Kingdom) Stuart Coupe	(United Kingdom) Allan Whittaker	(United Kingdom) Stuart Coupe	Subaru Impreza 555	—N/a
51	(Germany) Antony Warmbold	(United Kingdom) Gemma Price	(Germany) Antony Warmbold	Toyota Corolla WRC	—N/a
52	(United Kingdom) John Morton	(United Kingdom) Andrew Tatham	(United Kingdom) John Morton	Mitsubishi Lancer Evo VI	—N/a
53	(United Kingdom) Roger Duckworth	(United Kingdom) Mark Broomfield	(United Kingdom) Roger Duckworth	Subaru Impreza S5 WRC '98	—N/a
Group N Cup entries
39	(Austria) Manfred Stohl	(Austria) Peter Müller	(Austria) Manfred Stohl	Mitsubishi Lancer Evo VI	P
41	(Uruguay) Gustavo Trelles	(Argentina) Jorge Del Buono	(Uruguay) Gustavo Trelles	Mitsubishi Lancer Evo VI	—N/a
42	(Argentina) Gabriel Pozzo	(Argentina) Daniel Stillo	(Argentina) Gabriel Pozzo	Mitsubishi Lancer Evo VI	—N/a
43	(Sweden) Stig Blomqvist	(Venezuela) Ana Goñi	(United Kingdom) David Sutton Cars Ltd	Mitsubishi Lancer Evo VI	—N/a
44	(United Kingdom) Natalie Barratt	(Australia) Claire Parker	(United Kingdom) Natalie Barratt Rallysport	Mitsubishi Lancer Evo V	—N/a
45	(Belgium) Bob Colsoul	(Belgium) Tom Colsoul	(Belgium) Bob Colsoul	Mitsubishi Lancer Evo VI	—N/a
46	(United Kingdom) Alastair Cavenagh	(United Kingdom) Adrian Cavenagh	(United Kingdom) Alastair Cavenagh	Mitsubishi Lancer Evo VI	—N/a
47	(Argentina) Marcos Ligato	(Argentina) Rubén García	(Argentina) Marcos Ligato	Mitsubishi Lancer Evo VI	—N/a
48	(San Marino) Mirco Baldacci	(Italy) Maurizio Barone	(San Marino) Mirco Baldacci	Mitsubishi Lancer Evo VI	—N/a
59	(Portugal) Horácio Franco	(Portugal) Rui Torres	(Portugal) Horácio Franco	Mitsubishi Lancer Evo VI	—N/a
60	(Portugal) Vítor Pascoal	(Portugal) Duarte Costa	(Portugal) Vítor Pascoal	Mitsubishi Lancer Evo VI	—N/a
61	(Portugal) Pedro Leal	(Portugal) Redwan Cassamo	(Portugal) Creditus/BPN Rent	Mitsubishi Lancer Evo VI	—N/a
63	(Japan) Wakujiro Kobayashi	(Japan) Kohei Kusaka	(Japan) Wakujiro Kobayashi	Mitsubishi Lancer Evo V	—N/a
64	(Portugal) Pedro Cunha e Carmo	(Portugal) Filipe Fernandes	(Portugal) Pedro Cunha e Carmo	Mitsubishi Lancer Evo V	—N/a
65	(Portugal) Bruno Magalhães	(Portugal) Álvaro Ferreira	(Portugal) Bruno Magalhães	Mitsubishi Lancer Evo VI	—N/a
66	(Portugal) José Pedro Miranda	(Portugal) Luís Costa	(Portugal) José Pedro Miranda	Toyota Celica GT-Four	—N/a
67	(Portugal) Pedro Dias da Silva	(Portugal) Mário Castro	(Portugal) Pedro Dias da Silva	Mitsubishi Lancer Evo 6.5	—N/a
68	(Portugal) Rodrigo Ferreira	(Portugal) Luís Silva	(Portugal) Rodrigo Ferreira	Mitsubishi Lancer Evo VI	—N/a
69	(Portugal) Manuel Rolo	(Portugal) Luís Ramalho	(Portugal) Manuel Rolo	Mitsubishi Lancer Evo VI	—N/a
70	(Portugal) António Gravato	(Portugal) Lidio Lopes	(Portugal) António Gravato	Mitsubishi Carisma GT Evo VI	—N/a
71	(United Kingdom) Dan Marlow	(United Kingdom) Alyson Marlow	(United Kingdom) Dan Marlow	Mitsubishi Lancer Evo V	—N/a
72	(Portugal) Nuno Machado	(Portugal) Luís Cavaleiro	(Portugal) Nuno Machado	Subaru Impreza	—N/a
73	(Poland) Paweł Dytko	(Poland) Tomasz Dytko	(Poland) Paweł Dytko	Mitsubishi Lancer Evo VI	—N/a
74	(Belgium) François Duval	(Belgium) Jean-Marc Fortin	(Belgium) François Duval	Mitsubishi Carisma GT Evo VI	—N/a
75	(Italy) Luca Baldini	(Italy) Massimiliano Cerrai	(Italy) Luca Baldini	Mitsubishi Lancer Evo VI	—N/a
76	(France) Jean-François Bérenguer	(France) Aline Bérenguer-Marès	(France) Jean-François Bérenguer	Mitsubishi Lancer Evo VI	—N/a
77	(Portugal) José Cunha	(Portugal) José Nunes	(Portugal) José Cunha	Subaru Impreza WRX	—N/a
78	(Portugal) José Pereira	(Portugal) Franco Pereira	(Portugal) José Pereira	Subaru Impreza WRX	—N/a
79	(Portugal) Manuel Ferreira da Silva	(Portugal) José Pinho de Almeida	(Portugal) Manuel Ferreira da Silva	Mitsubishi Lancer Evo V	—N/a
81	(Portugal) Armando Tavares	(Portugal) Ricardo Nuno Pinto	(Portugal) Armando Tavares	Subaru Impreza 555	—N/a
82	(Portugal) Carlos Borges	(Portugal) Roberto Matos	(Portugal) Carlos Borges	Mitsubishi Carisma GT Evo IV	—N/a
83	(Italy) Gisella Rovegno	(Italy) Veruschka De Pellegrin	(Italy) Gisella Rovegno	Mitsubishi Lancer Evo VI	—N/a
84	(Portugal) Luís Moniz	(Portugal) António Freitas	(Portugal) Luís Moniz	Mitsubishi Lancer Evo IV	—N/a
102	(Portugal) Filipe Silva	(Portugal) Fernando Horta	(Portugal) Filipe Silva	Peugeot 106 Rallye	—N/a

=== Itinerary ===
All dates and times are WET (UTC±0).

Date	Time	No.	Stage name	Distance
Leg 1 — 155.47 km
8 March	18:30	SS1	Baltar Super Special	3.20 km
9 March	08:38	SS2	Viso 1	11.84 km
9 March	08:59	SS3	Fafe — Lameirinha 1	15.15 km
9 March	09:56	SS4	Vieira — Cabeceiras 1	26.68 km
9 March	11:55	SS5	Viso 2	11.84 km
9 March	12:16	SS6	Fafe — Lameirinha 2	15.15 km
9 March	13:13	SS7	Vieira — Cabeceiras 2	26.68 km
9 March	15:31	SS8	Amarante	18.44 km
9 March	16:01	SS9	Mondim de Basto	22.70 km
9 March	18:38	SS10	Lousada Super Special	3.79 km
Leg 2 — 177.35 km
10 March	08:25	SS11	Oliveira de Hospital 1	24.78 km
10 March	09:28	SS12	Arganil 1	14.27 km
10 March	09:56	SS13	Góis 1	19.62 km
10 March	12:25	SS14	Oliveira de Hospital 2	24.78 km
10 March	13:28	SS15	Arganil 2	14.27 km
10 March	13:56	SS16	Góis 2	19.62 km
10 March	15:45	SS17	Tábua	14.71 km
10 March	16:40	SS18	Mortágua	21.37 km
10 March	17:15	SS19	Aguieira	23.93 km
Leg 3 — 57.90 km
11 March	08:30	SS20	Ponte de Lima — Este	23.49 km
11 March	09:06	SS21	Ponte de Lima — Oeste	23.26 km
11 March	10:10	SS22	Ponte de Lima — Sul	11.15 km

== Results ==
=== Overall ===
Pos.	No.	Driver	Co-driver	Team	Car	Time	Difference	Points
1	7	(Finland) Tommi Mäkinen	(Finland) Risto Mannisenmäki	(Japan) Marlboro Mitsubishi Ralliart	Mitsubishi Lancer Evo 6.5	3:46:42.1		10
2	3	(Spain) Carlos Sainz	(Spain) Luis Moya	(United Kingdom) Ford Motor Co. Ltd.	Ford Focus RS WRC '01	3:46:50.7	+8.6	6
3	1	(Finland) Marcus Grönholm	(Finland) Timo Rautiainen	(France) Peugeot Total	Peugeot 206 WRC	3:49:37.7	+2:55.6	4
4	5	(United Kingdom) Richard Burns	(United Kingdom) Robert Reid	(Japan) Subaru World Rally Team	Subaru Impreza S7 WRC '01	3:50:06.4	+3:24.3	3
5	17	(France) François Delecour	(France) Daniel Grataloup	(United Kingdom) Ford Motor Co. Ltd.	Ford Focus RS WRC '01	3:56:48.9	+10:06.8	2
6	10	(United Kingdom) Alister McRae	(United Kingdom) David Senior	(South Korea) Hyundai Castrol World Rally Team	Hyundai Accent WRC2	3:58:50.5	+12:08.4	1

=== World Rally Cars ===
==== Classification ====
Position		No.	Driver	Co-driver	Entrant	Car	Time	Difference	Points
Event	Class	No.	Driver	Co-driver	Entrant	Car	Time	Difference	Points
1	1	7	(Finland) Tommi Mäkinen	(Finland) Risto Mannisenmäki	(Japan) Marlboro Mitsubishi Ralliart	Mitsubishi Lancer Evo 6.5	3:46:42.1		10
2	2	3	(Spain) Carlos Sainz	(Spain) Luis Moya	(United Kingdom) Ford Motor Co. Ltd.	Ford Focus RS WRC '01	3:46:50.7	+8.6	6
3	3	1	(Finland) Marcus Grönholm	(Finland) Timo Rautiainen	(France) Peugeot Total	Peugeot 206 WRC	3:49:37.7	+2:55.6	4
4	4	5	(United Kingdom) Richard Burns	(United Kingdom) Robert Reid	(Japan) Subaru World Rally Team	Subaru Impreza S7 WRC '01	3:50:06.4	+3:24.3	3
6	5	10	(United Kingdom) Alister McRae	(United Kingdom) David Senior	(South Korea) Hyundai Castrol World Rally Team	Hyundai Accent WRC2	3:58:50.5	+12:08.4	1
7	6	9	(Sweden) Kenneth Eriksson	(Sweden) Staffan Parmander	(South Korea) Hyundai Castrol World Rally Team	Hyundai Accent WRC2	4:00:14.6	+13:32.5	0
8	7	2	(France) Didier Auriol	(France) Denis Giraudet	(France) Peugeot Total	Peugeot 206 WRC	4:02:50.7	+16:08.6	0
Retired SS15		8	(Belgium) Freddy Loix	(Belgium) Sven Smeets	(Japan) Marlboro Mitsubishi Ralliart	Mitsubishi Carisma GT Evo VI	Transmission		0
Retired SS9		6	(Norway) Petter Solberg	(United Kingdom) Phil Mills	(Japan) Subaru World Rally Team	Subaru Impreza S7 WRC '01	Suspension		0
Retired SS8		4	(United Kingdom) Colin McRae	(United Kingdom) Nicky Grist	(United Kingdom) Ford Motor Co. Ltd.	Ford Focus RS WRC '01	Mechanical		0
Retired SS2		11	(Germany) Armin Schwarz	(Germany) Manfred Hiemer	(Czech Republic) Škoda Motorsport	Škoda Octavia WRC Evo2	Clutch		0
Retired SS1		12	(Belgium) Bruno Thiry	(Belgium) Stéphane Prévot	(Czech Republic) Škoda Motorsport	Škoda Octavia WRC Evo2	Electrical		0

==== Special stages ====
Day	Stage	Stage name	Length	Winner	Car	Time	Class leaders
Leg 1 (8 Mar)	SS1	Baltar Super Special	3.20 km	(Finland) Tommi Mäkinen	Mitsubishi Lancer Evo 6.5	3:46.9	(Finland) Tommi Mäkinen
Leg 1 (9 Mar)	SS2	Viso 1	11.84 km	(Finland) Harri Rovanperä	Peugeot 206 WRC	7:57.6	(Finland) Harri Rovanperä
Leg 1 (9 Mar)	SS3	Fafe — Lameirinha 1	15.15 km	(Finland) Tommi Mäkinen	Mitsubishi Lancer Evo 6.5	10:51.8	(Finland) Harri Rovanperä
Leg 1 (9 Mar)	SS4	Vieira — Cabeceiras 1	26.68 km	(Finland) Tommi Mäkinen	Mitsubishi Lancer Evo 6.5	20:36.2	(Finland) Tommi Mäkinen
Leg 1 (9 Mar)	SS5	Viso 2	11.84 km	(Spain) Carlos Sainz	Ford Focus RS WRC '01	8:17.0	(Finland) Tommi Mäkinen
Leg 1 (9 Mar)	SS6	Fafe — Lameirinha 2	15.15 km	Stage cancelled			(Finland) Tommi Mäkinen
Leg 1 (9 Mar)	SS7	Vieira — Cabeceiras 2	26.68 km	Stage cancelled			(Finland) Tommi Mäkinen
Leg 1 (9 Mar)	SS8	Amarante	18.44 km	(Finland) Harri Rovanperä	Peugeot 206 WRC	14:19.9	(Finland) Tommi Mäkinen
Leg 1 (9 Mar)	SS9	Mondim de Basto	22.70 km	(Spain) Carlos Sainz	Ford Focus RS WRC '01	17:41.9	(Finland) Tommi Mäkinen
Leg 1 (9 Mar)	SS10	Lousada Super Special	3.79 km	(Spain) Carlos Sainz	Ford Focus RS WRC '01	3:19.5	(Finland) Tommi Mäkinen
Leg 2 (10 Mar)	SS11	Oliveira de Hospital 1	24.78 km	(Finland) Tommi Mäkinen	Mitsubishi Lancer Evo 6.5	18:14.3	(Finland) Tommi Mäkinen
Leg 2 (10 Mar)	SS12	Arganil 1	14.27 km	(Finland) Tommi Mäkinen	Mitsubishi Lancer Evo 6.5	11:13.2	(Finland) Tommi Mäkinen
Leg 2 (10 Mar)	SS13	Góis 1	19.62 km	(United Kingdom) Richard Burns	Subaru Impreza S7 WRC '01	12:26.1	(Finland) Tommi Mäkinen
Leg 2 (10 Mar)	SS14	Oliveira de Hospital 2	24.78 km	(United Kingdom) Richard Burns	Subaru Impreza S7 WRC '01	18:42.0	(Finland) Tommi Mäkinen
Leg 2 (10 Mar)	SS15	Arganil 2	14.27 km	(Spain) Carlos Sainz	Ford Focus RS WRC '01	11:15.0	(Finland) Tommi Mäkinen
Leg 2 (10 Mar)	SS16	Góis 2	19.62 km	(Finland) Tommi Mäkinen	Mitsubishi Lancer Evo 6.5	12:33.0	(Finland) Tommi Mäkinen
Leg 2 (10 Mar)	SS17	Tábua	14.71 km	(Finland) Tommi Mäkinen	Mitsubishi Lancer Evo 6.5	11:13.3	(Finland) Tommi Mäkinen
Leg 2 (10 Mar)	SS18	Mortágua	21.37 km	(Spain) Carlos Sainz	Ford Focus RS WRC '01	15:30.1	(Finland) Tommi Mäkinen
Leg 2 (10 Mar)	SS19	Aguieira	23.93 km	Stage cancelled			(Finland) Tommi Mäkinen
Leg 3 (11 Mar)	SS20	Ponte de Lima — Este	23.49 km	Stage cancelled			(Finland) Tommi Mäkinen
Leg 3 (11 Mar)	SS21	Ponte de Lima — Oeste	23.26 km	(Spain) Carlos Sainz	Ford Focus RS WRC '01	18:19.2	(Spain) Carlos Sainz
Leg 3 (11 Mar)	SS22	Ponte de Lima — Sul	11.15 km	(Finland) Tommi Mäkinen	Mitsubishi Lancer Evo 6.5	8:52.3	(Finland) Tommi Mäkinen

==== Championship standings ====
Pos.	Drivers' championships			Co-drivers' championships			Manufacturers' championships		
Pos.	Move	Driver	Points	Move	Co-driver	Points	Move	Manufacturer	Points
1		(Finland) Tommi Mäkinen	20		(Finland) Risto Mannisenmäki	20		(Japan) Marlboro Mitsubishi Ralliart	33
2	1	(Spain) Carlos Sainz	16	1	(Spain) Luis Moya	16		(United Kingdom) Ford Motor Co. Ltd.	20
3	1	(Finland) Harri Rovanperä	10	1	(Finland) Risto Pietiläinen	10	1	(South Korea) Hyundai Castrol World Rally Team	8
4	1	(France) François Delecour	8	1	(France) Daniel Grataloup	8	1	(Japan) Subaru World Rally Team	7
5	1	(Sweden) Thomas Rådström	6	1	(Sweden) Tina Thörner	6	2	(Czech Republic) Škoda Motorsport	6

=== FIA Cup for Production Rally Drivers ===
==== Classification ====
Position		No.	Driver	Co-driver	Entrant	Car	Time	Difference	Points
Event	Class	No.	Driver	Co-driver	Entrant	Car	Time	Difference	Points
14	1	67	(Portugal) Pedro Dias da Silva	(Portugal) Mário Castro	(Portugal) Pedro Dias da Silva	Mitsubishi Lancer Evo 6.5	4:31:14.7		10
17	2	60	(Portugal) Vítor Pascoal	(Portugal) Duarte Costa	(Portugal) Vítor Pascoal	Mitsubishi Lancer Evo VI	4:46:15.1	+15:00.4	6
18	3	61	(Portugal) Pedro Leal	(Portugal) Redwan Cassamo	(Portugal) Creditus/BPN Rent	Mitsubishi Lancer Evo VI	4:47:41.9	+16:27.2	4
19	4	48	(San Marino) Mirco Baldacci	(Italy) Maurizio Barone	(San Marino) Mirco Baldacci	Mitsubishi Lancer Evo VI	4:47:56.9	+16:42.2	3
21	5	68	(Portugal) Rodrigo Ferreira	(Portugal) Luís Silva	(Portugal) Rodrigo Ferreira	Mitsubishi Lancer Evo VI	5:12:28.2	+41:13.5	2
22	6	73	(Poland) Paweł Dytko	(Poland) Tomasz Dytko	(Poland) Paweł Dytko	Mitsubishi Lancer Evo VI	5:15:36.6	+44:21.9	1
23	7	70	(Portugal) António Gravato	(Portugal) Lidio Lopes	(Portugal) António Gravato	Mitsubishi Carisma GT Evo VI	5:23:22.6	+52:07.9	0
24	8	79	(Portugal) Manuel Ferreira da Silva	(Portugal) José Pinho de Almeida	(Portugal) Manuel Ferreira da Silva	Mitsubishi Lancer Evo V	5:41:27.3	+1:10:12.6	0
Retired SS22		39	(Austria) Manfred Stohl	(Austria) Peter Müller	(Austria) Manfred Stohl	Mitsubishi Lancer Evo VI	Excluded - transmission		0
Retired SS22		47	(Argentina) Marcos Ligato	(Argentina) Rubén García	(Argentina) Marcos Ligato	Mitsubishi Lancer Evo VI	Excluded - transmission		0
Retired SS15		45	(Belgium) Bob Colsoul	(Belgium) Tom Colsoul	(Belgium) Bob Colsoul	Mitsubishi Lancer Evo VI	Accident		0
Retired SS15		66	(Portugal) José Pedro Miranda	(Portugal) Luís Costa	(Portugal) José Pedro Miranda	Toyota Celica GT-Four	Retired		0
Retired SS15		69	(Portugal) Manuel Rolo	(Portugal) Luís Ramalho	(Portugal) Manuel Rolo	Mitsubishi Lancer Evo VI	Over time limit		0
Retired SS15		72	(Portugal) Nuno Machado	(Portugal) Luís Cavaleiro	(Portugal) Nuno Machado	Subaru Impreza	Retired		0
Retired SS15		77	(Portugal) José Cunha	(Portugal) José Nunes	(Portugal) José Cunha	Subaru Impreza WRX	Retired		0
Retired SS15		83	(Italy) Gisella Rovegno	(Italy) Veruschka De Pellegrin	(Italy) Gisella Rovegno	Mitsubishi Lancer Evo VI	Retired		0
Retired SS13		81	(Portugal) Armando Tavares	(Portugal) Ricardo Nuno Pinto	(Portugal) Armando Tavares	Subaru Impreza 555	Retired		0
Retired SS11		65	(Portugal) Bruno Magalhães	(Portugal) Álvaro Ferreira	(Portugal) Bruno Magalhães	Mitsubishi Lancer Evo VI	Stuck in the mud		0
Retired SS11		75	(Italy) Luca Baldini	(Italy) Massimiliano Cerrai	(Italy) Luca Baldini	Mitsubishi Lancer Evo VI	Stuck in the mud		0
Retired SS11		84	(Portugal) Luís Moniz	(Portugal) António Freitas	(Portugal) Luís Moniz	Mitsubishi Lancer Evo IV	Mechanical		0
Retired SS9		74	(Belgium) François Duval	(Belgium) Jean-Marc Fortin	(Belgium) François Duval	Mitsubishi Carisma GT Evo VI	Engine		0
Retired SS8		64	(Portugal) Pedro Cunha e Carmo	(Portugal) Filipe Fernandes	(Portugal) Pedro Cunha e Carmo	Mitsubishi Lancer Evo V	Retired		0
Retired SS5		24	(Uruguay) Gustavo Trelles	(Argentina) Jorge Del Buono	(Uruguay) Gustavo Trelles	Mitsubishi Lancer Evo VI	Accident		0
Retired SS5		42	(Argentina) Gabriel Pozzo	(Argentina) Daniel Stillo	(Argentina) Gabriel Pozzo	Mitsubishi Lancer Evo VI	Stuck in the mud		0
Retired SS5		59	(Portugal) Horácio Franco	(Portugal) Rui Torres	(Portugal) Horácio Franco	Mitsubishi Lancer Evo VI	Lost wheel		0
Retired SS4		43	(Sweden) Stig Blomqvist	(Venezuela) Ana Goñi	(United Kingdom) David Sutton Cars Ltd	Mitsubishi Lancer Evo VI	Mechanical		0
Retired SS4		44	(United Kingdom) Natalie Barratt	(Australia) Claire Parker	(United Kingdom) Natalie Barratt Rallysport	Mitsubishi Lancer Evo V	Accident		0
Retired SS4		63	(Japan) Wakujiro Kobayashi	(Japan) Kohei Kusaka	(Japan) Wakujiro Kobayashi	Mitsubishi Lancer Evo V	Accident		0
Retired SS4		71	(United Kingdom) Dan Marlow	(United Kingdom) Alyson Marlow	(United Kingdom) Dan Marlow	Mitsubishi Lancer Evo V	Mechanical		0
Retired SS4		102	(Portugal) Filipe Silva	(Portugal) Fernando Horta	(Portugal) Filipe Silva	Peugeot 106 Rallye	Retired		0
Retired SS2		46	(United Kingdom) Alastair Cavenagh	(United Kingdom) Adrian Cavenagh	(United Kingdom) Alastair Cavenagh	Mitsubishi Lancer Evo VI	Retired		0
Retired SS2		76	(France) Jean-François Bérenguer	(France) Aline Bérenguer-Marès	(France) Jean-François Bérenguer	Mitsubishi Lancer Evo VI	Stuck in the mud		0
Retired SS2		78	(Portugal) José Pereira	(Portugal) Franco Pereira	(Portugal) José Pereira	Subaru Impreza WRX	Retired		0
Retired SS1		82	(Portugal) Carlos Borges	(Portugal) Roberto Matos	(Portugal) Carlos Borges	Mitsubishi Carisma GT Evo IV	Electrical		0

==== Special stages ====
Day	Stage	Stage name	Length	Winner	Car	Time	Class leaders
Leg 1 (8 Mar)	SS1	Baltar Super Special	3.20 km	(Uruguay) Gustavo Trelles	Mitsubishi Lancer Evo VI	4:09.0	(Uruguay) Gustavo Trelles
Leg 1 (9 Mar)	SS2	Viso 1	11.84 km	(Argentina) Gabriel Pozzo	Mitsubishi Lancer Evo VI	8:57.8	(Argentina) Gabriel Pozzo
Leg 1 (9 Mar)	SS3	Fafe — Lameirinha 1	15.15 km	(Austria) Manfred Stohl	Mitsubishi Lancer Evo VI	12:29.2	(Austria) Manfred Stohl
Leg 1 (9 Mar)	SS4	Vieira — Cabeceiras 1	26.68 km	(Argentina) Gabriel Pozzo	Mitsubishi Lancer Evo VI	24:20.9	(Argentina) Gabriel Pozzo
Leg 1 (9 Mar)	SS5	Viso 2	11.84 km	(Austria) Manfred Stohl	Mitsubishi Lancer Evo VI	9:20.8	(Austria) Manfred Stohl
Leg 1 (9 Mar)	SS6	Fafe — Lameirinha 2	15.15 km	Stage cancelled			(Austria) Manfred Stohl
Leg 1 (9 Mar)	SS7	Vieira — Cabeceiras 2	26.68 km	Stage cancelled			(Austria) Manfred Stohl
Leg 1 (9 Mar)	SS8	Amarante	18.44 km	(Austria) Manfred Stohl	Mitsubishi Lancer Evo VI	16:28.5	(Austria) Manfred Stohl
Leg 1 (9 Mar)	SS9	Mondim de Basto	22.70 km	(Austria) Manfred Stohl	Mitsubishi Lancer Evo VI	20:08.2	(Austria) Manfred Stohl
Leg 1 (9 Mar)	SS10	Lousada Super Special	3.79 km	(Austria) Manfred Stohl	Mitsubishi Lancer Evo VI	3:47.3	(Austria) Manfred Stohl
Leg 2 (10 Mar)	SS11	Oliveira de Hospital 1	24.78 km	(Argentina) Marcos Ligato	Mitsubishi Lancer Evo VI	21:30.1	(Austria) Manfred Stohl
Leg 2 (10 Mar)	SS12	Arganil 1	14.27 km	(Argentina) Marcos Ligato	Mitsubishi Lancer Evo VI	13:25.7	(Austria) Manfred Stohl
Leg 2 (10 Mar)	SS13	Góis 1	19.62 km	(Austria) Manfred Stohl	Mitsubishi Lancer Evo VI	14:41.0	(Austria) Manfred Stohl
Leg 2 (10 Mar)	SS14	Oliveira de Hospital 2	24.78 km	(Argentina) Marcos Ligato	Mitsubishi Lancer Evo VI	21:15.8	(Austria) Manfred Stohl
Leg 2 (10 Mar)	SS15	Arganil 2	14.27 km	(Argentina) Marcos Ligato	Mitsubishi Lancer Evo VI	13:54.4	(Argentina) Marcos Ligato
Leg 2 (10 Mar)	SS16	Góis 2	19.62 km	(Argentina) Marcos Ligato	Mitsubishi Lancer Evo VI	14:37.9	(Argentina) Marcos Ligato
Leg 2 (10 Mar)	SS17	Tábua	14.71 km	(Austria) Manfred Stohl	Mitsubishi Lancer Evo VI	12:11.9	(Argentina) Marcos Ligato
Leg 2 (10 Mar)	SS18	Mortágua	21.37 km	(Austria) Manfred Stohl	Mitsubishi Lancer Evo VI	17:15.2	(Argentina) Marcos Ligato
Leg 2 (10 Mar)	SS19	Aguieira	23.93 km	Stage cancelled			(Argentina) Marcos Ligato
Leg 3 (11 Mar)	SS20	Ponte de Lima — Este	23.49 km	Stage cancelled			(Argentina) Marcos Ligato
Leg 3 (11 Mar)	SS21	Ponte de Lima — Oeste	23.26 km	(Austria) Manfred Stohl	Mitsubishi Lancer Evo VI	19:55.9	(Austria) Manfred Stohl
Leg 3 (11 Mar)	SS22	Ponte de Lima — Sul	11.15 km	(Austria) Manfred Stohl	Mitsubishi Lancer Evo VI	10:07.5	(Portugal) Pedro Dias da Silva

==== Championship standings ====
Pos.	Drivers' championships		
Pos.	Move	Driver	Points
1		(Switzerland) Olivier Gillet	10
2		(Sweden) Stig-Olov Walfridsson	10
3	New entry	(Portugal) Pedro Dias da Silva	10
4	1	(Austria) Manfred Stohl	6
5	1	(Sweden) Kenneth Bäcklund	6
