= Daniel Oliveira (rally driver) =

Brazilian rally driver (born 1985)

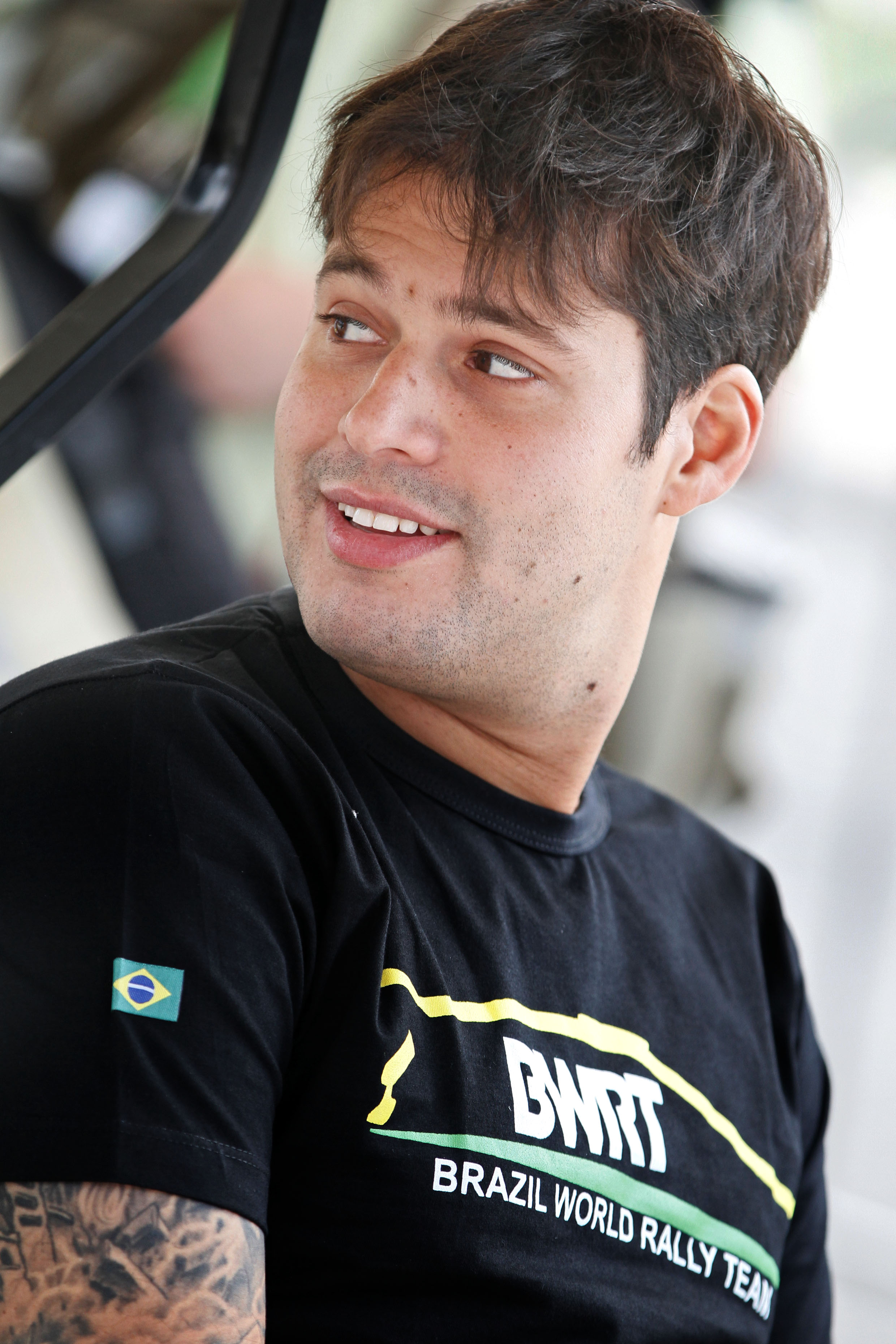
- Oliveira at 2012 Rally de Portugal

Personal information
- Nationality: Brazilian
- Born: 12 July 1985 (age 41); Salvador, Bahia

World Rally Championship record
- Years active: 2009–present
- Teams: Brazil World Rally Team
- Rallies: 16
- Championships: 0
- Rally wins: 0
- Podiums: 0
- Stage wins: 0
- Total points: 0
- First rally: 2009 Rally Argentina
- Last rally: 2012 Rallye de France

Daniel Rolim Oliveira (born 12 July 1985) is a Brazilian rally driver.

== Career ==
On entering the Intercontinental Rally Challenge in the 2010 season, Oliveira was known only locally. He participated in ten rallies during the season, achieving two points at the Rally Internacional de Curitiba.

In 2011, Oliveira moved up to the World Rally Championship, driving a MINI Countryman WRC for the new rally team Brazil World Rally Team. He moved to a Ford Fiesta in 2012, but disappeared from the WRC at seasons' end.

== Racing record ==
=== WRC results ===
Year	Entrant	Car	1	2	3	4	5	6	7	8	9	10	11	12	13	Pos	Points
2009	Barattero	Subaru Impreza WRX STi	IRE	NOR	CYP	POR	ARG; 23	ITA	GRE	POL	FIN	AUS	ESP	GBR		NC	0
2011	Brazil World Rally Team	Mini John Cooper Works S2000	SWE	MEX	POR; Ret	JOR; 19										NC	0
2011	Brazil World Rally Team	Mini John Cooper Works WRC					ITA; 29	ARG; Ret	GRE; Ret	FIN; 49	GER; Ret	AUS; Ret	FRA; Ret	ESP; 25	GBR; 35	NC	0
2012	Daniel Oliveira	Subaru Impreza STi	MON	SWE; 41	MEX											NC	0
2012	Brazil World Rally Team	Ford Fiesta RS WRC				POR; 12	ARG; Ret	GRE; Ret	NZL	FIN	GER; 24	GBR	FRA; Ret	ITA	ESP; 16	NC	0

=== IRC results ===
Year	Entrant	Car	1	2	3	4	5	6	7	8	9	10	11	12	Pos	Points
2010	(Brazil) Daniel Oliveira	Peugeot 207 S2000	MON; 20		ARG; Ret	CAN; Ret	SAR	YPR; Ret	AZO	MAD; 21	ZLI; Ret	SAN; Ret	SCO; Ret	CYP; Ret	36th	2
2010	(Austria) Stohl Racing	Peugeot 207 S2000		CUR; 7											36th	2
