= Manfred Stohl =

Austrian rally driver (born 1972)

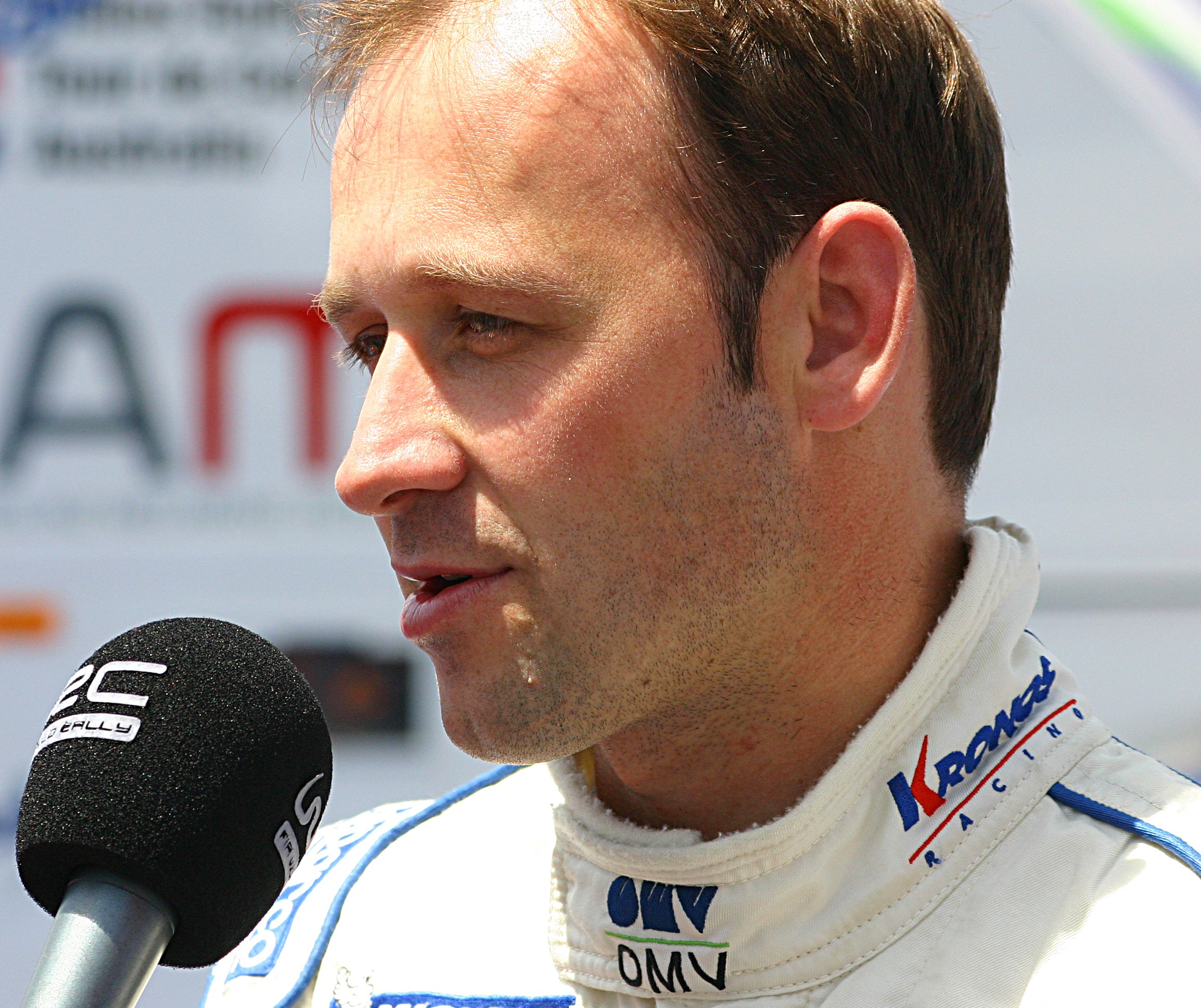
- Stohl at the 2005 Cyprus Rally.

Personal information
- Nationality: Austria
- Born: 7 July 1972 (age 54); Vienna, Austria

World Rally Championship record
- Years active: 1991–2007, 2012
- Co-driver: (Germany) Kay Gerlach (Germany) Peter Diekmann (Germany) Jürgen Bertl (Austria) Reinhard Kaufmann (Austria) Peter Müller (Germany) Dieter Schneppenheim (Austria) Ilka Minor
- Teams: Mitsubishi, Hyundai, OMV, Brazil WRT
- Rallies: 127
- Championships: 0
- Rally wins: 0
- Podiums: 6
- Stage wins: 10
- Total points: 101
- First rally: 1991 Rallye Côte d'Ivoire
- Last rally: 2012 Rally New Zealand

Manfred Stohl (born 7 July 1972, in Vienna) is an Austrian rally driver who debuted in the World Rally Championship in 1991. Stohl's co-driver is fellow Austrian Ilka Minor.

== Career ==
Stohl ventured into rallying following the career path of his father Rudi Stohl. Stohl's first professional rally was the 1991 Rallye Côte d'Ivoire Bandama, driving an Audi 90 Quattro with Kay Gerlach as his co-driver. He took his first World Rally Championship points by finishing seventh in the same event the following year.

After several more privateer entries in the WRC, Stohl got a contract with Team Mitsubishi Ralliart Germany to compete in the FIA Cup for Drivers of Production Cars (now the Production World Rally Championship) driving a Mitsubishi Lancer Evolution. He finished third in the championship in 1997, second in 1998 and fourth in 1999, before winning the title in 2000 ahead of defending champion Gustavo Trelles.

Progressing from Group N production cars to World Rally Cars, Stohl took his first WRC points in ten years by driving his Peugeot 206 WRC to seventh place at the 2003 Wales Rally GB. In the 2004 season, driving mainly for the OMV World Rally Team, backed by Austrian oil company OMV, his best event result was sixth at the Acropolis Rally.

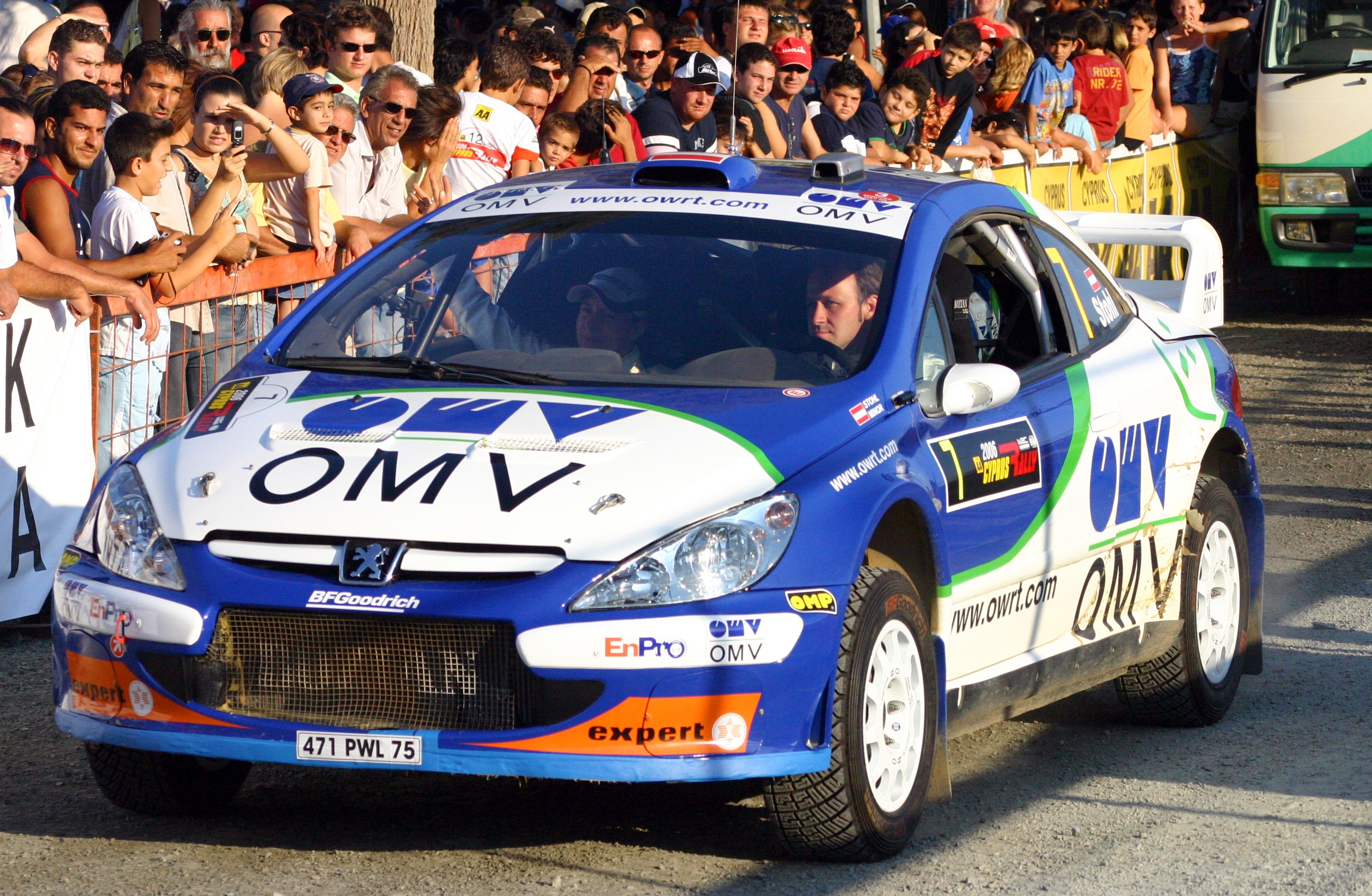
Stohl with a Peugeot 307 WRC at the 2006 Cyprus Rally

In 2005, Stohl continued with the OMV team now driving the Citroën Xsara WRC. He took his first podium finish with a surprise second place at the Cyprus Rally, behind Citroën Total factory driver Sébastien Loeb. In the season-ending Rally Australia, he took his second podium by finishing third. His results placed him ninth in the Drivers' World Championship.

In the 2006 season, with Henning Solberg as his team-mate, Stohl drove a Peugeot 307 WRC for the Bozian Racing-run OMV Peugeot Norway WRT. He took four podium places and finished a career-best fourth in the drivers' standings. He also became one of the few drivers to reach participation in 100 world rallies without winning one of them.

In 2007, Stohl returned to the wheel of a Xsara WRC for the OMV Kronos Citroën. After a disappointing season, in which he finished ninth in the championship and his best result was sixth place in both Mexico and Japan, OMV withdrew their support of Stohl. This left him without a full-time drive for the 2008 season. Stohl returned to WRC at 2012 Rally New Zealand, driving Ford Fiesta RS WRC for Brazil World Rally Team, replacing the regular driver Daniel Oliveira. He finished tenth in the rally.

Since disappearing from the WRC, Stohl has successfully run his own team, Stohl Racing. The team is currently responsible for developing and running Subaru Impreza WRX STi R4 cars in the Intercontinental Rally Challenge, with the crew of 2008 PWRC champion Andreas Aigner and Stohl's old partner, Ilka Minor. Meanwhile, Stohl -with a self-developed, petrol-powered Mitsubishi Lancer Evo IX- is contesting the Austrian Rally Championship (ÖRM); in 2012, he finished third overall against strong opposition, and remained winless through the season.

== Racing record ==
=== Complete WRC results ===
Year	Entrant	Car	1	2	3	4	5	6	7	8	9	10	11	12	13	14	15	16	WDC	Points
1991	Manfred Stohl	Audi 90 Quattro	MON	SWE	POR	KEN	FRA	GRE	NZL	ARG	FIN	AUS	ITA	CIV; Ret	ESP	GBR			–	0
1992	Manfred Stohl	Audi 90 Quattro	MON	SWE	POR	KEN; Ret	FRA	GRE	NZL	ARG	FIN	AUS	ITA	CIV; 7	ESP	GBR			41st	4
1993	Manfred Stohl	Audi 90 Quattro	MON	SWE	POR	KEN; 10	FRA	GRE											65th	1
1993	Manfred Stohl	Audi Coupé S2							ARG; 12	NZL	FIN	AUS	ITA	ESP	GBR				65th	1
1994	Manfred Stohl	Audi Coupé S2	MON	POR	KEN	FRA	GRE; Ret	ARG	NZL; Ret	FIN	ITA	GBR							–	0
1995	Manfred Stohl	Audi Coupé S2	MON	SWE	POR; Ret	FRA	NZL	AUS	ESP	GBR; Ret									–	0
1996	Manfred Stohl	Audi Coupé S2	SWE	KEN; DSQ	IDN	GRE		AUS	ITA	ESP; 17									NC	0
1996	Manfred Stohl	Subaru Impreza 555					ARG; 11												NC	0
1997	Mitsubishi Ralliart Germany	Mitsubishi Lancer Evolution III	MON; 13	SWE; 18	KEN	POR; 8	ESP; 18	FRA	ARG; 12	GRE	NZL		IDN	ITA; 20	AUS	GBR			NC	0
1997	Mitsubishi Ralliart Germany	Mitsubishi Lancer Evolution IV										FIN; 20							NC	0
1998	Manfred Stohl	Mitsubishi Lancer Evolution III	MON; 15	SWE	KEN; 11	POR; 18	ESP; 23		ARG; Ret	GRE; Ret	NZL; 15	FIN	ITA; Ret	AUS; 21					NC	0
1998	Manfred Stohl	Mitsubishi Lancer Evolution V						FRA; 20							GBR; 10				NC	0
1999	Manfred Stohl	Mitsubishi Lancer Evolution V	MON; Ret	SWE; 18	KEN; 12	POR; Ret	ESP; Ret	FRA; 21	ARG; Ret	GRE; Ret	NZL								NC	0
1999	Manfred Stohl	Mitsubishi Lancer Evolution VI										FIN; 18	CHN	ITA; 25	AUS	GBR; Ret			NC	0
2000	Manfred Stohl	Mitsubishi Lancer Evolution VI	MON; 9	SWE; 20	KEN; 11	POR; 17	ESP; 19	ARG; Ret	GRE; 13	NZL; 7	FIN; 18	CYP; 15	FRA; 17	ITA; 25	AUS; 14	GBR; 17			NC	0
2001	Manfred Stohl	Mitsubishi Lancer Evolution VI	MON; 10	SWE	POR; DSQ			CYP; 12				NZL; 16			AUS; 22				NC	0
2001	Top Run	Fiat Punto S1600				ESP; Ret	ARG		GRE; Ret	KEN	FIN; Ret		ITA; Ret	FRA; 22		GBR; Ret			NC	0
2002	Manfred Stohl	Toyota Corolla WRC	MON; 16	SWE	FRA	ESP													NC	0
2002	Manfred Stohl	Ford Focus RS WRC 01					CYP; Ret	ARG	GRE	KEN	FIN	GER	ITA			GBR; 12			NC	0
2002	Top Run	Mitsubishi Lancer Evolution VI												NZL; 22	AUS; 10				NC	0
2003	Stohl Racing	Peugeot 206 WRC	MON	SWE	TUR	NZL; Ret	ARG				FIN	AUS	ITA	FRA; Ret	ESP	GBR; 7			19th	2
2003	Manfred Stohl	Hyundai Accent WRC						GRE; 11	CYP										19th	2
2003	Hyundai World Rally Team	Hyundai Accent WRC								GER; 18									19th	2
2004	OMV World Rally Team	Mitsubishi Lancer Evolution VII	MON	SWE; Ret	MEX; Ret	NZL; 10	CYP			ARG; 12	FIN							AUS; Ret	18th	4
2004	OMV World Rally Team	Mitsubishi Lancer Evolution VIII										GER; 32	JPN						18th	4
2004	Manfred Stohl	Peugeot 206 WRC						GRE; 6	TUR					GBR; 8	ITA	FRA	ESP		18th	4
2005	OMV World Rally Team	Citroën Xsara WRC	MON; 6	SWE	MEX	NZL; 9	ITA; 9	CYP; 2	TUR	GRE; 20	ARG; 8	FIN; Ret	GER; Ret	GBR; 5	JPN	FRA	ESP	AUS; 3	9th	22
2006	OMV Peugeot Norway WRT	Peugeot 307 WRC	MON; 4	SWE; 18	MEX; 3	ESP; 12	FRA; 7	ARG; 4	ITA; 7	GRE; Ret	GER; 5	FIN; 9	JPN; 5	CYP; 4	TUR; 8	AUS; 3	NZL; 3	GBR; 2	4th	54
2007	OMV Kronos Citroën WRT	Citroën Xsara WRC	MON; 10	SWE; 7	NOR; 12	MEX; 6	POR; 9	ARG; 8	ITA; 7	GRE; 8	FIN; Ret	GER; Ret	NZL; 12	ESP; Ret	FRA; 14	JPN; 6	IRE; Ret	GBR; 8	9th	13
2012	Brazil World Rally Team	Ford Fiesta RS WRC	MON	SWE	MEX	POR	ARG	GRE	NZL; 10	FIN	GER	GBR	FRA	ITA	ESP				35th	1

=== PWRC results ===
Year	Entrant	Car	1	2	3	4	5	6	7	8	9	10	11	12	13	14	PWRC	Points
1997	Mitsubishi Ralliart Germany	Mitsubishi Lancer Evolution III	MON; 3	SWE; 6	KEN	POR; 2	ESP; 5	FRA	ARG; 3	GRE	NZL		IDN	ITA; 4	AUS	GBR	3rd	26
1997	Mitsubishi Ralliart Germany	Mitsubishi Lancer Evolution IV										FIN; 6					3rd	26
1998	Manfred Stohl	Mitsubishi Lancer Evolution III	MON; 1	SWE	KEN; 2	POR; 2	ESP; 2		ARG; Ret	GRE; Ret	NZL; 3	FIN	ITA; Ret	AUS; 4			2nd	71
1998	Manfred Stohl	Mitsubishi Lancer Evolution V						FRA; 1							GBR; 1		2nd	71
1999	Manfred Stohl	Mitsubishi Lancer Evolution V	MON; Ret	SWE; 4	KEN; 4	POR; Ret	ESP; Ret	FRA; 2	ARG; Ret	GRE; Ret	NZL						4th	27
1999	Manfred Stohl	Mitsubishi Lancer Evolution VI										FIN; 3	CHN	ITA; 2	AUS	GBR; Ret	4th	27
2000	Manfred Stohl	Mitsubishi Lancer Evolution VI	MON; 1	SWE; 4	KEN; 3	POR; 2	ESP; 3	ARG; Ret	GRE; 3	NZL; 1	FIN; 3	CYP; 4	FRA; 1	ITA; 4	AUS; 3	GBR; 1	1st	75
2004	OMV World Rally Team	Mitsubishi Lancer Evo VII	SWE; Ret	MEX; Ret	NZL; 1	ARG; 2	GER; 9	FRA	AUS; Ret								6th	18

=== JWRC Results ===
Year	Entrant	Car	1	2	3	4	5	6	JWRC	Points
2001	Top Run	Fiat Punto S1600	ESP; Ret	GRE; Ret	FIN; Ret	ITA; Ret	FRA; 8	GBR; Ret	-	0

=== Complete FIA World Rallycross Championship results ===
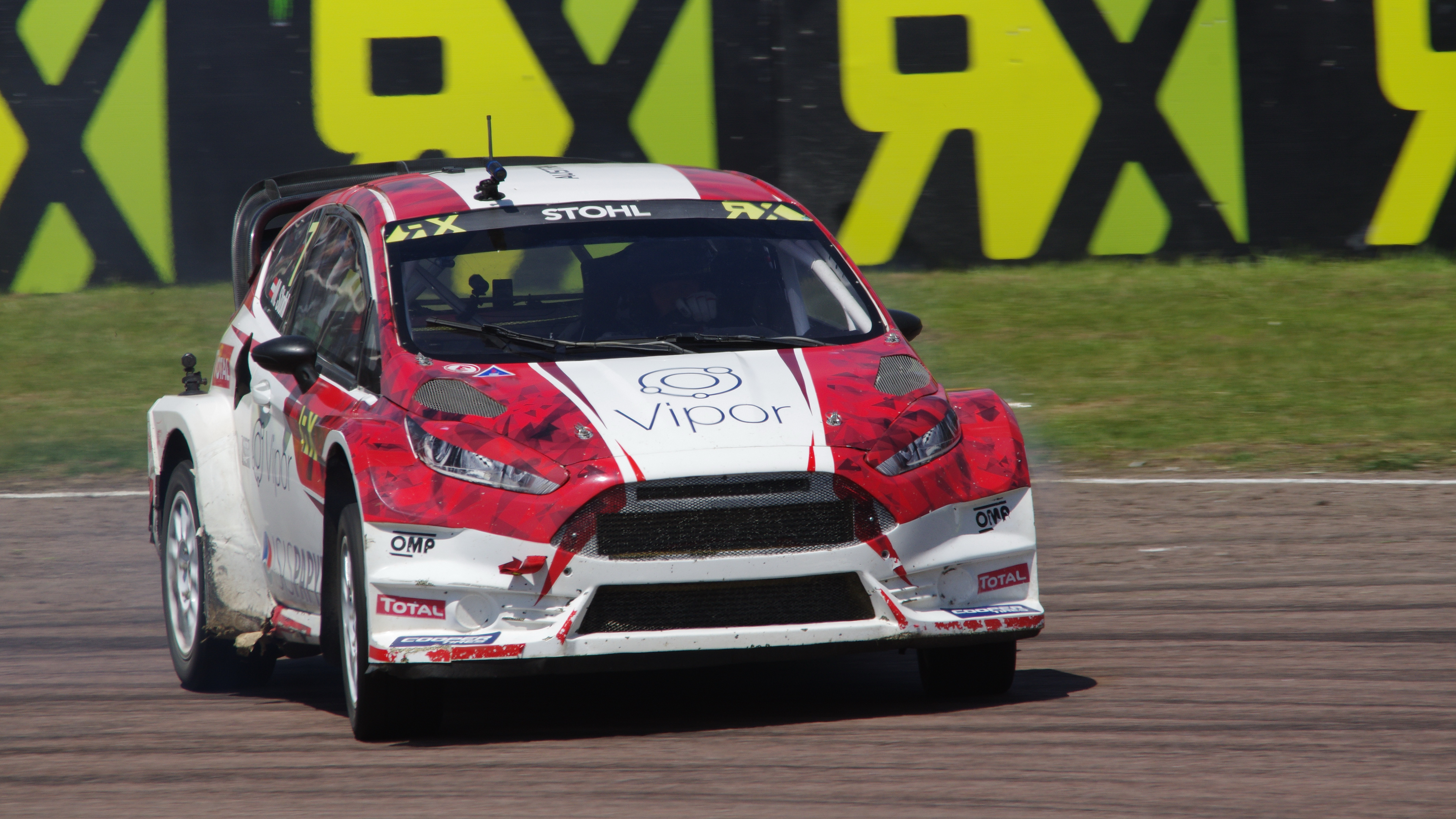
Stohl driving for World RX Team Austria in the 2015 World RX of Great Britain

==== Supercar ====
Year	Entrant	Car	1	2	3	4	5	6	7	8	9	10	11	12	13	Position	Points
2014	PSRX	Citroën DS3	POR	GBR	NOR	FIN	SWE	BEL	CAN	FRA	GER	ITA	TUR	ARG; 10		34th	9
2015	World RX Team Austria	Ford Fiesta	POR; 12	HOC; 14	BEL; 11	GBR; 10	GER; 8	SWE; 13	CAN; 10	NOR; 14	FRA; 21	BAR; 13	TUR; 13	ITA; 5	ARG; 12	11th	82
