= Brazil World Rally Team =

World Rally Championship manufacturer team

- Full name: Brazil World Rally Team
- Base: Salvador, Brazil; Groß-Enzersdorf, Austria
- Team principal(s): Frank Allison Maciel
- Drivers: (Brazil) Daniel Oliveira
- Co-drivers: (Portugal) Carlos Magalhaes
- Chassis: Ford Fiesta RS WRC
- Tyres: Michelin

World Rally Championship history
- Debut: 2011
- Manufacturers' Championships: 0
- Drivers' Championships: 0
- Rally wins: 0

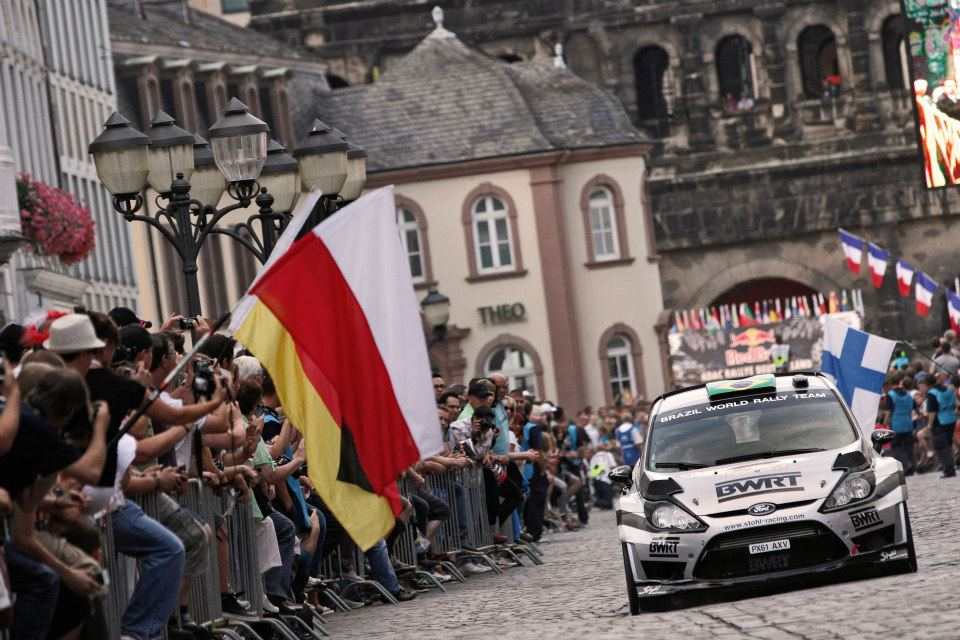
Brazil World Rally Team at Rallye Deutschland

The Brazil World Rally Team (or BWRT) is a Brazilian World Rally Championship team, based in Salvador, Brazil and Groß-Enzersdorf, Austria, that made their début in the 2011 season at the Rally de Portugal, round three of the 2011 season. They started with a Super 2000-spec Mini before switching to the Mini John Cooper Works WRC for their next round, the Rally d'Italia Sardegna. In 2012, at the Rally de Portugal, they switched to the Ford Fiesta RS WRC. The team has been registered as a WRC Team entry, and plans to add a second car to the lineup by 2013.

The Brazil World Rally Team has young Brazilian driver Daniel Oliveira along with his Portuguese co-driver Carlos Magalhães. The main goal for BWRT is to increase the popularity of rallying in Brazil. The reason for this is that Brazil has not had much success over the 38 years of the existence of the WRC. The country held two WRC events before in 1981 and 1982, won by Ari Vatanen and Michèle Mouton respectively. There have also been very few Brazilian rally drivers that have had any success, so Daniel Oliveira is considered a promise.

The Brazil World Rally Team started receiving technical and operational support from Prodrive in the United Kingdom, who develop the Mini WRC and S2000 cars, with respected team manager Paul Howarth and engineer Nick Navas heavily involved in the project. Brazil World Rally Team's president, Frank Allison Maciel, and manager, Paul Handal, also performed key roles. Since 2012, Oliveira's Ford Fiesta RS WRC is managed by Stohl Racing, owned by Manfred Stohl.

At the end of 2012 season, BWRT owns 28 points on the Manufacturers' Championship of 2012 World Rally Championship season.

== WRC results ==
Year	Entrant	Car	No	Driver	1	2	3	4	5	6	7	8	9	10	11	12	13	WDC	Points	WMC	Points
2011	Brazil World Rally Team	Mini John Cooper Works WRC	12	(Brazil) Daniel Oliveira					ITA; 29	ARG; Ret	GRE; Ret	FIN; 49	GER; Ret	AUS; Ret	FRA; Ret	ESP; 25	GBR; 35	-	0	-	-
2011	Brazil World Rally Team	Mini Cooper S2000 1.6T	12	(Brazil) Daniel Oliveira	SWE	MEX	POR; Ret	JOR; 19										-	0	-	-
2012	Brazil World Rally Team	Ford Fiesta RS WRC	9	(Brazil) Daniel Oliveira	MON	SWE	MEX	POR; 12	ARG; Ret	GRE; Ret			GER; 23	GBR	FRA; Ret	ITA	ESP; 16	-	0	7th	28
2012	Brazil World Rally Team	Ford Fiesta RS WRC	9	(Austria) Manfred Stohl							NZL; 10	FIN						29th	1	7th	28
2013	Stohl Racing	Ford Fiesta RS WRC	22	(Brazil) Daniel Oliveira	MON	SWE	MEX	POR	ARG; 12	GRE	ITA	FIN	GER	AUS	FRA	ESP	GBR	-	0	-	-
