= Alastair Cavenagh =

Welsh rally driver

Personal information
- Nationality: (United Kingdom) British
- Born: 17 November 1964 (age 62); Brecknock, Wales, United Kingdom

World Rally Championship record
- Years active: 1998-2001
- Teams: Privateer
- Rallies: 8
- Championships: 0
- Rally wins: 0
- Podiums: 0
- Stage wins: 0
- Total points: 0
- First rally: 1998 Safari Rally
- Last rally: 2001 Safari Rally

Alastair Mark Cavenagh (born 1964) is a Kenyan-based rally driver and entrepreneur born in Wales, Great Britain. He drives in the Safari Rally occasionally, including a second-place finish in 2009, when it was an IRC event. Cavenagh therefore got his first podium in the series.

Cavenagh raced in the WRC in eight rallies from 1998 to 2001, but only finished one which was Acropolis in 2001.
