= Harri =

Male given name

Harri is a given name and a surname. Notable people with these names include:

== Given name ==
- Harri Anne Smith, (born 1962), American Republican member of the Alabama Senate
- Harri Eloranta (born 1963), Finnish biathlete
- Harri Hänninen (born 1963), Finnish long-distance runner
- Harri Haatainen (born 1978), Finnish javelin thrower
- Harri Hakkarainen (born 1969), Finnish javelin thrower
- Harri Hylje, mascot of Finnish shipping company Silja Line
- Harri Holkeri (1937–2011), Prime Minister of Finland from 1987 to 1991
- Harri Huhtala (born 1952), Finnish hammer thrower
- Harri Hursti (born 1968), Finnish computer programmer and former chairman of the board and co-founder of ROMmon
- Harri Jõgisalu (1922–2014), Estonian writer
- T. Harri Jones (1921–1965), Welsh poet and university lecturer
- Harri Kampman (born 1954), Finnish football manager and former player
- Harri Kirvesniemi (born 1958), Finnish cross country skier
- Harri Koskela (born 1965), Finnish wrestler and Olympic medalist in Greco-Roman wrestling
- Harri Koskinen (born 1970), Finnish designer
- Harri Linnonmaa (born 1946), Finnish ice hockey player
- Harri Lorenzi (born 1949), Brazilian agronomic engineer
- Harri Lumi (born 1933), Estonian former Communist politician
- Harri Mänty (born 1971), Swedish musician, brought up in Finland
- Harri Morgan (rugby union) (born 2000), Welsh rugby union player
- Harri Olli (born 1985), Finnish ski jumper
- Harri Õunapuu (born 1947), Estonian politician
- Harri Porten (born 1972), German software engineer
- Harri Roschier (born 1957), Finnish entrepreneur
- Harri Rovanperä (born 1966), Finnish rally driver
- Harri Siljander (1922–2010), Finnish boxer
- Harri Sjöström (born 1952), Finnish saxophonist who specializes in the soprano saxophone
- Harri Stojka (born 1957), Austrian jazz guitarist
- Harri Tiido (born 1953), Estonian diplomat
- Harri Toivonen (born 1960), Finnish rally and race car driver
- Harri Webb (1920–1994), Anglo-Welsh poet, journalist and Welsh nationalist

== Surname ==
- Guto Harri (born 1966), Welsh former BBC Chief Political Correspondent
- Vivianne Härri (born 1991), Swiss alpine skier

== See also ==
- Harri railway station, Chhattisgarh, India
- Harri Jones Memorial Prize for Poetry, annual prize awarded by the University of Newcastle, Australia
- Harrie
- Hari (disambiguation)
- Harris (surname)
- Harry (disambiguation)
- Hari (disambiguation)
