= Harrie =

Harrie is a given name. Notable people with the name include:

- Harrie B. Chase (1889–1969), Judge of the United States Court of Appeals
- Harrie Cross (1893–1958), Australian rules footballer
- Harrie Dadmun, American football player
- Harrie Geelen (1939–2025), Dutch illustrator, film director, animator, translator, writer and poet
- Harrie Gommans (born 1983), Dutch footballer
- Harrie Irving Hancock (1868–1922), American chemist and juvenile writer
- Harrie Hattam (1890–1947), Australian rules footballer
- Harrie van Heumen (born 1959), Dutch ice hockey player
- Harrie Jansen (born 1947), Dutch racing cyclist
- Harrie Koorstra (1930–2004), Dutch sprint canoeist
- Harrie Langman (1931–2016), Dutch VVD politician
- Harrie Lavreysen (born 1997), Dutch track cyclist
- Harrie T. Lindeberg (1879–1959), American architect
- Harrie Massey (1908–1983), Australian mathematical physicist
  - Harrie Massey Medal and Prize
- Harrie Meyers (1879–1928), Dutch track cyclist, also known as Harie Meijers
- Harrie Mitchell (1906–1967), Australian politician
- Harrie Seward (1884–1958), Australian politician
- Harrie Skinner (1854–1936), Australian circus proprietor and founder of auto club
- Harrie Smolders (born 1980), Dutch equestrian
- Harrie Steevens (born 1945), Dutch racing cyclist
- Harrie Vredenburg (born 1952), Dutch-born Canadian business academic
- Harrie Wade OBE (1905–1964), Australian federal politician and minister
- Harrie Wood (1831–1917), Australian miner and civil servant

== See also ==
- Lilla Harrie, locality situated in Skåne County, Sweden
- Harald (disambiguation)
- Harold (disambiguation)
- Harry (disambiguation)
