= Rovanperä =

Rovanperä is a surname. Notable people with the surname include:

- Harri Rovanperä (born 1966), Finnish rally driver
- Kalle Rovanperä (born 2000), Finnish rally driver
