= Robert Harry =

Robert Harry may refer to:

- Robert Harry (MP for Winchelsea) in 1373 and 1382
- Robert Harry (MP for Seaford) in 1397 and 1399
