= Harri Rovanperä =

Finnish rally driver (born 1966)

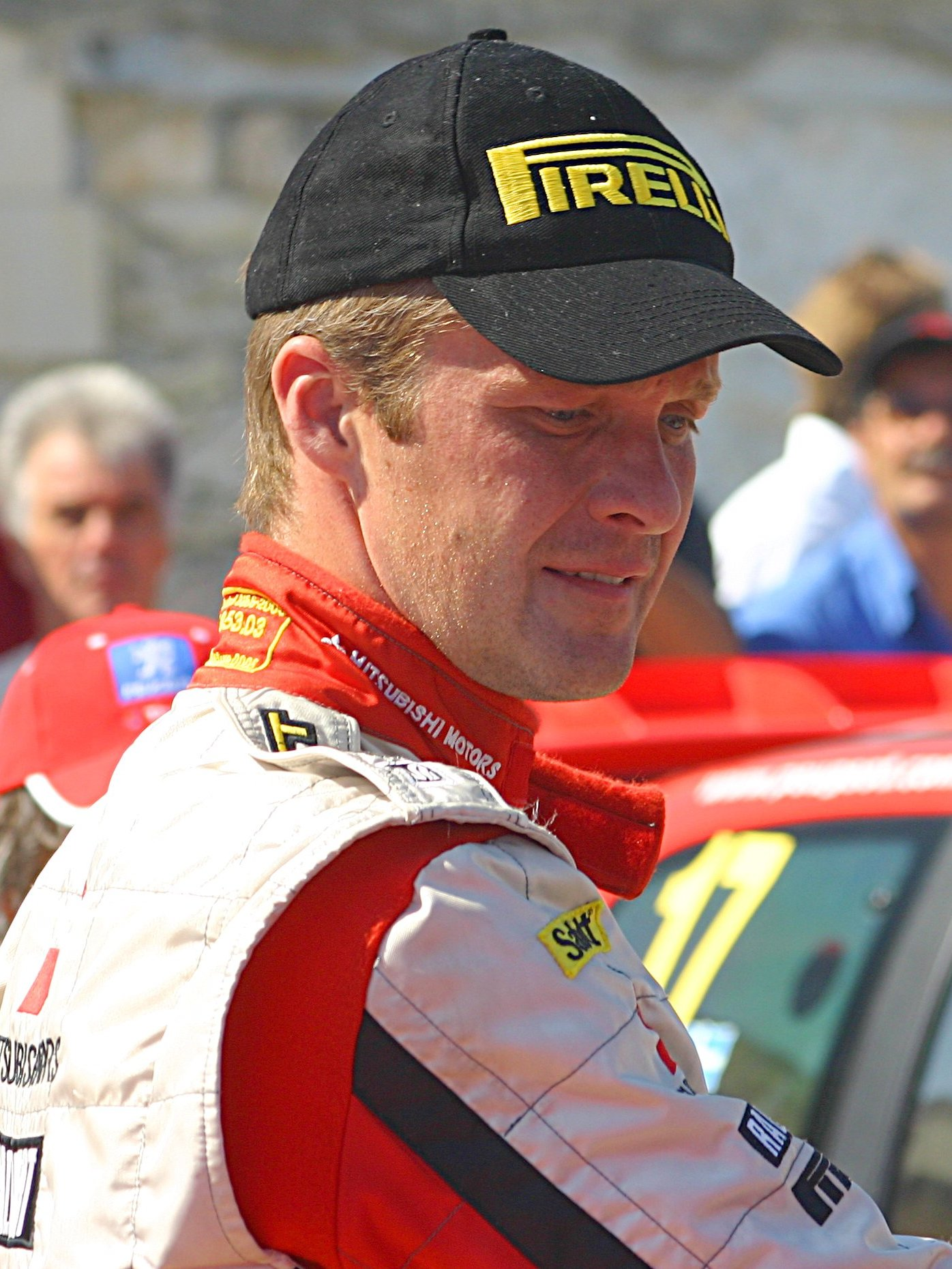
- Rovanperä in 2005.
- Nationality: (Finland) Finnish
- Full name: Harri Tapani Rovanperä
- Born: 8 April 1966 (age 60) Jyväskylä, Finland
- Relatives: Kalle Rovanperä (son)
Harri Rovanperä
World Rally Championship record
- Years active: 1993 – 2006
- Co-driver: (Finland) Risto Pietiläinen (Finland) Voitto Silander (Finland) Juha Repo
- Teams: SEAT, Peugeot, Mitsubishi, Red Bull Škoda
- Rallies: 111
- Championships: 0
- Rally wins: 1
- Podiums: 15
- Stage wins: 76
- Total points: 171
- First rally: 1993 1000 Lakes Rally
- First win: 2001 Swedish Rally
- Last rally: 2006 Wales Rally GB

Harri Tapani "Rovis" Rovanperä (Finnish pronunciation: [ˈhɑrːi ˈroʋɑmˌperæ]; born 8 April 1966) is a Finnish rally driver who competed in the World Rally Championship from 1993 to 2006. He drove for SEAT (1997–00), Peugeot (2001–04), Mitsubishi (2005) and Red Bull Škoda Team (2006). Rovanperä was known as a loose surface specialist. He is the father of 2022 and 2023 World Rally Drivers' Champion Kalle Rovanperä. He was married to Tiina Rovanperä.

== Career ==
Rovanperä won the small Group A Finnish Rally Championship title in 1995 at the wheel of an Opel Astra. After a few outings on his national World Rally Championship event Rally Finland, he was hired by SEAT to drive the SEAT Ibiza Kit Car, with which he won SEAT's third consecutive 2L World Rally Championship title in 1998. Next year in 1999, he took part in the top class World Rally Championship with the SEAT Córdoba WRC E2 finishing in the third place in the last event of the season at the 55th Network Q Rally of Great Britain. In 2001, he was hired by Peugeot. Driving a Peugeot 206 WRC, he took his first and only WRC win at the Swedish Rally. The same year he finished fifth in the overall championship only eight points behind the winner, Richard Burns, despite missing two rallies.

On 9 December 2001, Rovanperä also competed at the Race of Champions at Gran Canaria, and by winning the individual event and taking home the Henri Toivonen Memorial Trophy, he earned the title of Champion of Champions, he beat in the final stage the German driver Armin Schwarz.

== 2002 ==
The 2002 season began as usual with the Monte Carlo Rally, and Rovanperä competed in a privateer Bozian Racing run Peugeot 206 WRC. He retired on the 7th stage with broken steering after an off; Tommi Mäkinen won the race in front of a penalised Sébastien Loeb, while Carlos Sainz finished third. The second rally was in Sweden, where Rovanperä returned in the official factory-entered Peugeot 206 WRC, and he finished the rally in second place, 1'24" behind team mate Marcus Grönholm, despite winning two stages and leading the rally from Stages 3 to 14.

The next two rallies were Tour de Corse and Rally de Cataluñya, both on tarmac, where Rovanperä competed for the Bozian-run team; on both rallies, he failed to score, finishing 11th in Corsica and 7th in Spain, on a surface he traditionally struggled on.

The next rally took place on the island of Cyprus, where heavy rain made conditions treacherous. Rovanperä drove the official Peugeot works car, finishing 4th and winning 1 stage. The rally was won again by his teammate Grönholm.

The WRC circus moved then to Argentina, where Peugeot had a dismal rally, Rovanperä retired after engine problems on S.S.10, Gronhölm and Burns took first and second, but were both disqualified a few days later due to an illegal flywheel and illegal servicing respectively; so Sainz won the rally from Petter Solberg.

In Greece, on a very hot and rough surface, Rovanperä finished fourth, winning 1 stage. The rally winner was Colin McRae.

The "World's toughest Rally", the Safari Rally, gifted Rovanperä with a second place, 2'50" behind the winner Colin McRae, in a rally that forced many of the drivers to retire.

In his home race at Finland, Rovanperä had what was possibly his strongest rally of the season, seizing the lead on the 12th stage, but on the next stage he crashed and a front suspension part was badly damaged, forcing him to retire. The rally was won by teammate and compatriot Grönholm for the third year running.

In Germany, a new rally event in the WRC, Rovanperä drove an official car, as regular tarmac expert Gilles Panizzi was withdrawn from the event due to a shoulder injury he sustained while carrying out DIY at his home. However, Rovanperä was forced to retire after a very difficult rally, which saw the first victory of Sébastien Loeb in a Citroën Xsara.

In San Remo, Rovanperä returned to the Bozian team, but on asphalt the Finnish driver struggled and finished ninth, whilst Gilles Panizzi took a stunning win after his shoulder injury just three weeks before.

Rovanperä drove a near-faultless rally in New Zealand despite a hydraulic problem, finishing second, 3'50" behind Gronholm, who clinched his second WRC title.

The championship continued in the southern hemisphere with Rally Australia, and Rovanperä finished in second place again behind his team mate Grönholm, but this time only 57" behind, and winning 8 stages of the rally.

The season came to an end in the forests of Wales, where Rovanperä finished seventh after a race full of mistakes.

Rovanperä ended 2002 in seventh overall with 30 points, 47 behind teammate Gronholm, but only seven behind runner-up Petter Solberg.

== Next seasons ==
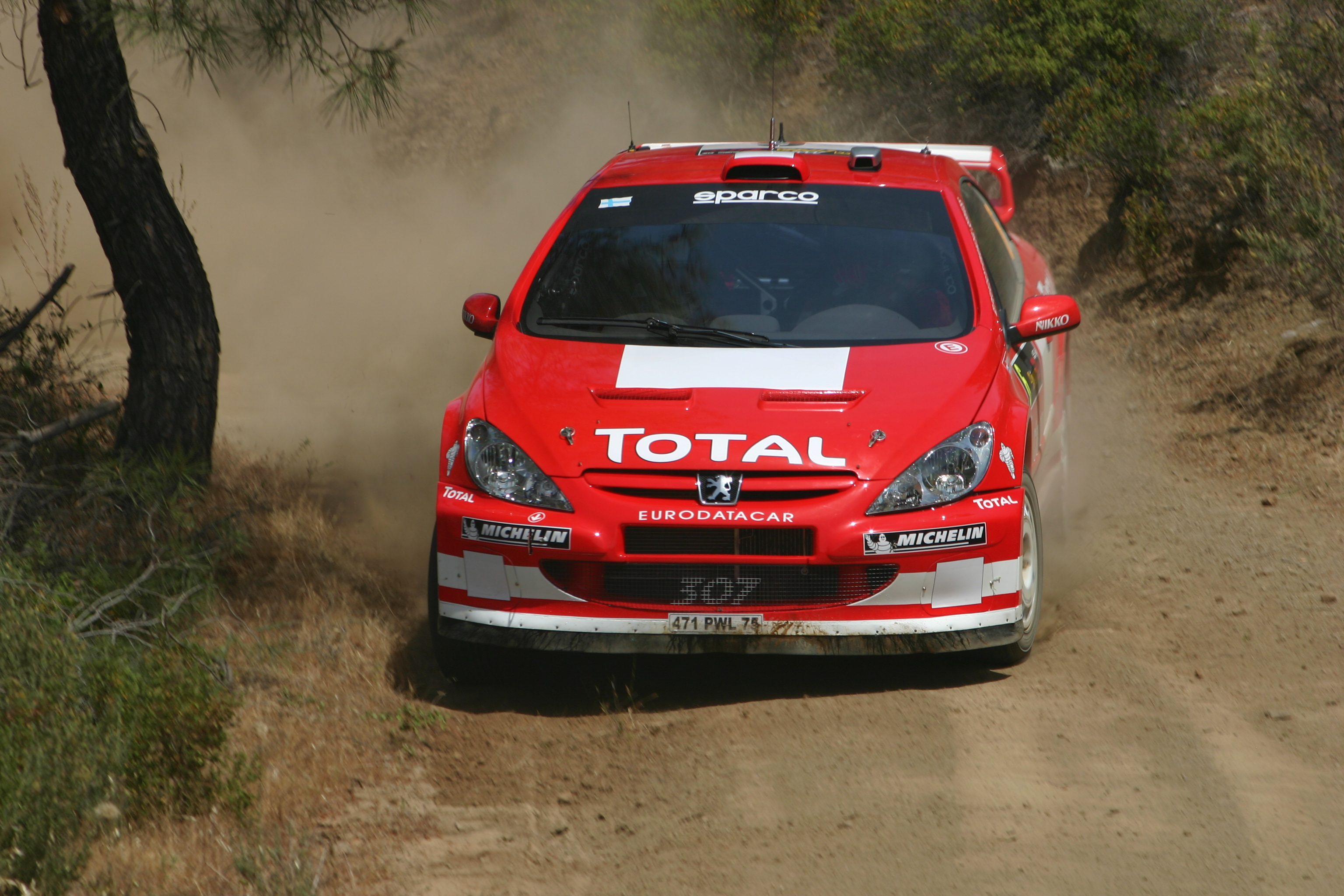
Rovanperä at the 2004 Cyprus Rally.

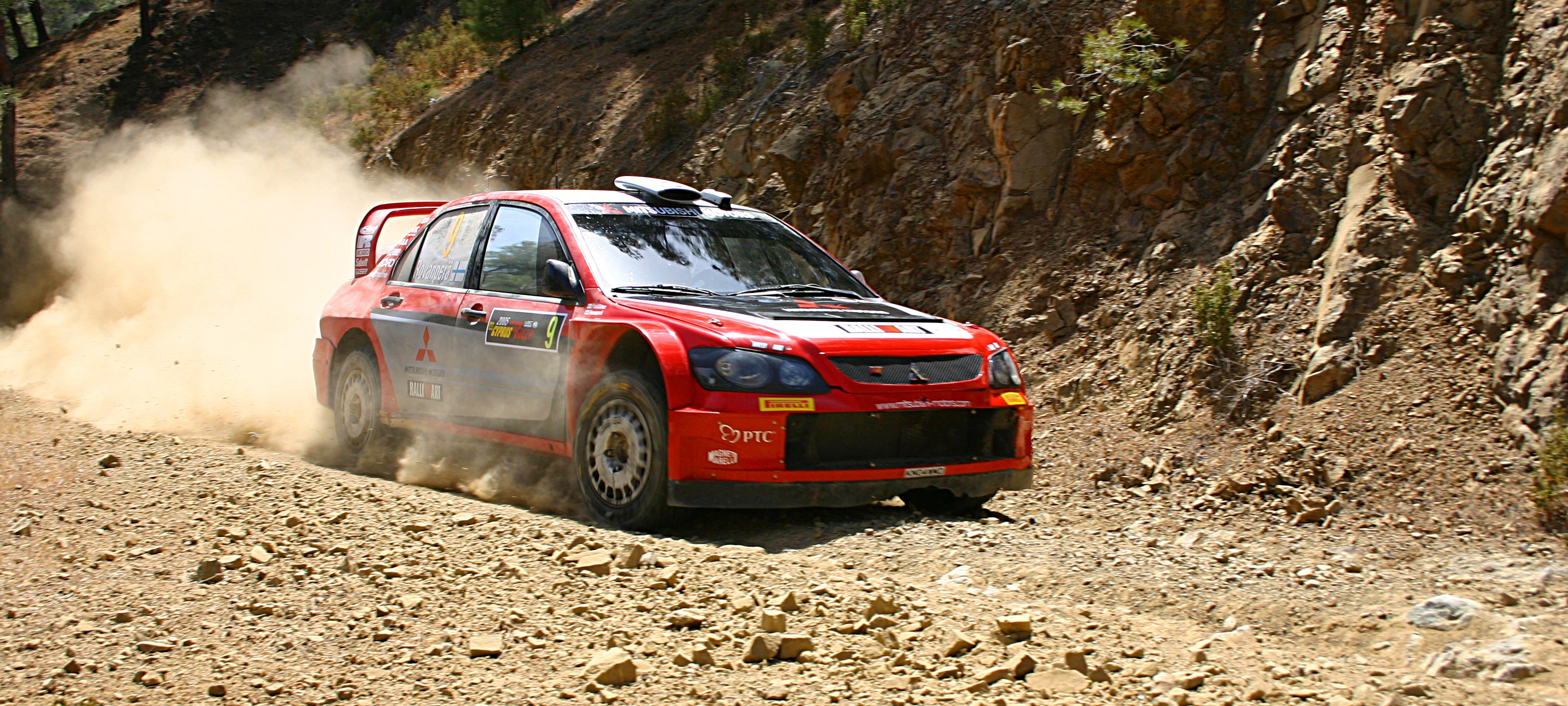
Rovanperä at the 2005 Cyprus Rally.

Rovanperä finishing in 1st place at the 2010 Carrera Panamericana.

Rovanperä continued to drive for Peugeot on loose surface events during the 2003 and 2004 seasons, obtaining a further three podium places, one in 2003, and two in 2004. In 2005, Rovanperä moved to Mitsubishi and completed a full WRC programme, finishing seventh in the drivers' world championship, claiming one podium finish in Australia, where he was second behind François Duval. After Mitsubishi left the series at the end of 2005, Rovanperä signed on to drive for the semi-works Red Bull Škoda Team for six events during the 2006 season, his best result being ninth on the final event in Wales.

In 2007, Rovanperä was a regular competitor of the SRC Finnish Rallycross Championship with a rear-wheel driven Ford Focus as well as a Volvo S40, but finished only 11th overall. He had many technical problems with both cars.

In October 2010, Rovanperä and his co-driver Jouni Närhi got the first overall in La Carrera Panamericana in a Studebaker 1953 just 12.9 seconds ahead from the Mexican driver Michel Jourdain Jr.

== WRC victories ==
#	Event	Season	Co-driver	Car
1	(Sweden) 50th International Swedish Rally	2001	Risto Pietiläinen	Peugeot 206 WRC

== Career results ==
=== WRC results ===
Year	Entrant	Car	1	2	3	4	5	6	7	8	9	10	11	12	13	14	15	16	WDC	Points
1993	Harri Rovanperä	Opel Manta	MON	SWE	POR	KEN	FRA	GRE	ARG	NZL	FIN; Ret	AUS	ITA	ESP	GBR				NC	0
1994	Harri Rovanperä	Mitsubishi Galant VR-4	MON	POR	KEN	FRA	GRE	ARG	NZL	FIN; 12	ITA	GBR							NC	0
1996	Promoracing Finland	Ford Escort RS Cosworth	SWE	KEN	IDN	GRE	ARG	FIN; Ret	AUS	ITA	ESP								NC	0
1997	Seat Sport	Seat Ibiza GTi 16V	MON; 14	SWE	KEN	POR; Ret	ESP; Ret	FRA	ARG; 8	GRE	NZL; Ret	FIN; 10	IDN; 7	ITA; 10	AUS; 10	GBR; 9			NC	0
1998	Seat Sport	Seat Ibiza GTi 16V Evo2	MON; 11	SWE; Ret	KEN; 5	POR; Ret	ESP; Ret	FRA	ARG; Ret	GRE; 15	NZL; 13								15th	3
1998	Seat Sport	Seat Cordoba WRC										FIN; 11	ITA; Ret	AUS; 11	GBR; 6				15th	3
1999	Seat Sport	Seat Cordoba WRC	MON; 7	SWE; 16	KEN; 6	POR; Ret	ESP; 14	FRA; 13	ARG; Ret	GRE; Ret	NZL; Ret								9th	10
1999	Seat Sport	Seat Cordoba WRC Evo2										FIN; 5	CHN; 5	ITA; 16	AUS; 6	GBR; 3			9th	10
2000	Seat Sport	Seat Cordoba WRC Evo2	MON	SWE; 12	KEN														9th	7
2000	Seat Sport	Seat Cordoba WRC Evo3														GBR; 10			9th	7
2000	Harri Rovanperä	Toyota Corolla WRC				POR; 4	ESP	ARG	GRE	NZL	FIN; 3	CYP	FRA	ITA	AUS				9th	7
2001	Peugeot Total	Peugeot 206 WRC	MON	SWE; 1	POR; Ret	ESP	ARG; Ret	CYP; Ret	GRE; 3	KEN; 2	FIN; 4	NZL; 3			AUS; 4	GBR; 2			5th	36
2001	H.F. Grifone SRL	Peugeot 206 WRC											ITA; 11	FRA; 7					5th	36
2002	Bozian Racing	Peugeot 206 WRC	MON; Ret		FRA; 11	ESP; 7							ITA; 9						7th	30
2002	Peugeot Total	Peugeot 206 WRC		SWE; 2			CYP; 4	ARG; Ret	GRE; 4	KEN; 2	FIN; Ret	GER; Ret		NZL; 2	AUS; 2	GBR; 7			7th	30
2003	Marlboro Peugeot Total	Peugeot 206 WRC	MON	SWE; Ret	TUR; Ret	NZL; Ret	ARG; 4	GRE; 6	CYP; 2	GER	FIN; Ret	AUS; 7	ITA	FRA	ESP	GBR; Ret			11th	18
2004	Marlboro Peugeot Total	Peugeot 307 WRC	MON	SWE	MEX; 10	NZL; 5	CYP; DSQ	GRE; 3	TUR; Ret	ARG; 5	FIN; Ret	GER	JPN; 6	GBR; 6	ITA; Ret	FRA	ESP	AUS; 2	8th	28
2005	Mitsubishi Motors	Mitsubishi Lancer WRC05	MON; 7	SWE; 4	MEX; 5	NZL; Ret	ITA; Ret	CYP; 7	TUR; 10	GRE; 6	ARG; 5	FIN; 7	GER; 10	GBR; 4	JPN; 5	FRA; 10	ESP; 10	AUS; 2	7th	39
2006	Red Bull Škoda	Škoda Fabia WRC	MON	SWE	MEX	ESP	FRA; 12	ARG	ITA; 20	GRE; 12	GER	FIN	JPN	CYP; Ret	TUR; 11	AUS	NZL	GBR; 9	NC	0

Sporting positions
Preceded by Tommi Mäkinen	Race of Champions; Champion of Champions; 2001	Succeeded by Marcus Grönholm
