= Harry (surname) =

Harry is a surname. Notable people with the surname include:

- Andrew Harry (born 1968), Guyanese sprinter
- Bill Harry (born 1938), creator of the newspaper Mersey Beat
- David G. Harry (1880–1955), American politician and farmer
- Debbie Harry (born 1945), American singer-songwriter and actress
- Emile Harry (born 1963), American football player
- J. S. Harry (1939–2015), Australian poet
- John Harry (cricketer) (1857–1919), Australian cricketer
- John Harry (MP) (fl. 1410), MP for Hastings
- Michael Harry (born 1961), Danish curler
- N'Keal Harry (born 1997), American football player
- Robert Harry I, MP for Winchelsea in 1373 and 1382
- Robert Harry II, MP for Seaford in 1397 and 1399
- Troels Harry (born 1990), Danish curler
