= Harry =

Harry may refer to:

== Television ==
- Harry (American TV series), 1987 comedy series starring Alan Arkin
- Harry (British TV series), 1993 BBC drama that ran for two seasons
- Harry (game show), 2012 French game show hosted by Sébastien Folin
- Harry (New Zealand TV series), 2013 crime drama starring Oscar Kightley
- Harry (talk show), 2016 American daytime talk show hosted by Harry Connick Jr.

== People and fictional characters ==
- Harry (given name), a list of people and fictional characters with the given or nickname including
  - Prince Harry, Duke of Sussex (born 1984)
- Harry (surname), a list of people with the surname

== Other uses ==
- "Harry", the tunnel used in the Stalag Luft III escape ("The Great Escape") of World War II
- Harry (album), a 1969 album by Harry Nilsson
- Harry (derogatory term), derogatory term used in Norway
- Harry (newspaper), an underground newspaper in Baltimore, Maryland
- "Harry (poem)", 1962 poem by Francis Webb

== See also ==
- Harry and Meghan (disambiguation)
- Old Harry (disambiguation)
