= SEAT Córdoba WRC =

SEAT World Rally Car

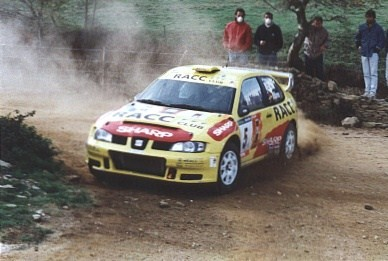
- Daniel Solà driving a SEAT Córdoba WRC at the Rallye de tierra de Cangas del Narcea.
- Category: World Rally Car
- Constructor: SEAT

Technical specifications
- Length: 4,135 mm (162.8 in) (debut); 4,172 mm (164.3 in) (upgrade)
- Width: 1,770 mm (69.7 in)
- Height: 1,500 mm (59.1 in)
- Axle track: 1,520 mm (59.8 in)
- Wheelbase: 2,443 mm (96.2 in)
- Engine: 1,995 cc (121.7 cu in) I4 turbo charge Front transverse
- Transmission: Six-speed sequential 4-wheel drive
- Weight: 1,230 kg (2,711.7 lb)
- Tyres: Pirelli

Competition history (WRC)
- Notable entrants: (Spain) SEAT World Rally Team
- Notable drivers: (France) Didier Auriol; (United Kingdom) Gwyndaf Evans; (Finland) Toni Gardemeister; (Finland) Marcus Grönholm; (Italy) Piero Liatti; (Finland) Harri Rovanperä; (Spain) Daniel Solà
- Debut: 1998 Rally Finland
Races	Wins	Podiums	Titles
37	0	3	0

The SEAT Córdoba WRC is a World Rally Car built for the SEAT World Rally Team in the World Rally Championship. It is based upon the SEAT Córdoba road car, and was debuted at the 1998 Rally Finland.

== Competition history ==
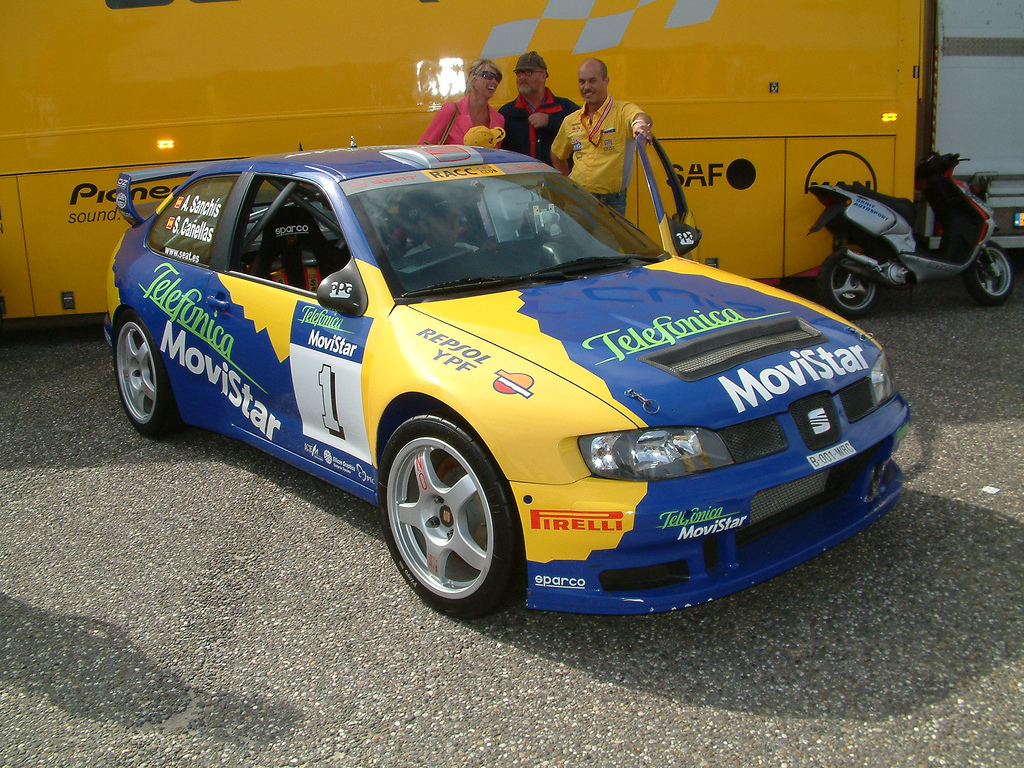
A Córdoba WRC in 2006

The Córdoba WRC was SEAT's official rally car in the World Rally Championship from 1998 to 2000. It featured a 2.0 litre turbocharged engine. The Córdoba WRC competed in the top category of the championship, as SEAT had homologated a World Rally Car version of the Córdoba 16v for competition in the FIA World Rally Championship and other international rallies.

1994 World Drivers' Champion Didier Auriol, of France, and Toni Gardemeister and Harri Rovanperä, both of Finland, were among those to drive the factory cars.

It made its debut at the 1998 Rally Finland, with Harri Rovanperä as the main driver. The car achieved podiums at the 1999 Rally New Zealand, driven by Toni Gardemeister, the 1999 Rally GB, driven by Rovanperä, as well as in the 2000 Safari Rally, driven by Didier Auriol. The works programme concluded at the end of the season of 2000, with the third evolution of the rally car.

However, the Córdoba WRC continued to compete with successful results in national championships in different countries. In Spain, the Córdoba won the national title of all the rallies on gravel with Pedro Diego and Marc Blázquez, and wins in tarmac rallies with Salvador Cañellas Jr.

== WRC Results ==
Year	Car	No	Driver	1	2	3	4	5	6	7	8	9	10	11	12	13	14	WDC	Points	WMC	Points
1998	SEAT Córdoba WRC	9	(Finland) Harri Rovanperä	MON	SWE	KEN	POR	ESP	FRA	ARG	GRC	NZL	FIN; 11	ITA; Ret	AUS; 11	GBR; 6		15th*	3*	5th	1
1998	SEAT Córdoba WRC	10	(Spain) Oriol Gómez	MON	SWE	KEN	POR	ESP	FRA	ARG	GRC	NZL	FIN; Ret					-	0	5th	1
1998	SEAT Córdoba WRC	10	(Belgium) Marc Duez											ITA; 16	AUS; Ret			-	0	5th	1
1998	SEAT Córdoba WRC	10	(United Kingdom) Gwyndaf Evans													GBR; Ret		-	0	5th	1
1999	SEAT Córdoba WRC	9	(Finland) Harri Rovanperä	MON; 7	SWE; 16	KEN; 6	POR; Ret	ESP; 14	FRA; 13	ARG; Ret	GRE; Ret	NZL; Ret						9th	10	5th	23
1999	Seat Cordoba WRC Evo2	9	(Finland) Harri Rovanperä										FIN; 5	CHN; 5	ITA; 16	AUS; 6	GBR; 3	9th	10	5th	23
1999	SEAT Córdoba WRC	10	(Italy) Piero Liatti	MON; 6	SWE	KEN; Ret	POR; Ret	ESP; 10	FRA; 9	ARG; Ret	GRE; Ret							23rd	1	5th	23
1999	Seat Cordoba WRC Evo2	10	(Italy) Piero Liatti											CHN; Ret	ITA; 16			23rd	1	5th	23
1999	SEAT Córdoba WRC	10	(Finland) Marcus Grönholm		SWE; Ret													15th*	5*	5th	23
1999	SEAT Córdoba WRC	10	(Finland) Toni Gardemeister									NZL; 3						13th*	6*	5th	23
1999	Seat Cordoba WRC Evo2	10	(Finland) Toni Gardemeister										FIN; 6			AUS; 16	GBR; Ret	13th*	6*	5th	23
1999	Seat Cordoba WRC Evo2	16	(United Kingdom) Gwyndaf Evans	MON	SWE	KEN	POR	ESP	FRA	ARG	GRE	NZL	FIN	CHN	ITA	AUS	GBR; Ret	-	0	5th	23
1999	Seat Cordoba WRC Evo2	20	(Finland) Toni Gardemeister	MON	SWE	KEN	POR	ESP	FRA	ARG	GRE			CHN	ITA; Ret			13th*	6*	5th	23
2000	SEAT Cordoba WRC Evo2	7	(France) Didier Auriol	MON; Ret	SWE; 10	KEN; 3	POR; 10	ESP; 13	ARG; Ret	GRC; Ret	NZL; Ret							12th	4	5th	11
2000	SEAT Córdoba WRC Evo3	7	(France) Didier Auriol									FIN; 11	CYP; Ret	FRA; 8	ITA; 17	AUS; 8	GBR; 9	12th	4	5th	11
2000	SEAT Cordoba WRC Evo2	8	(Finland) Toni Gardemeister	MON; 4	SWE; Ret	KEN; Ret	POR; 9	ESP; Ret	ARG; Ret	GRC; Ret	NZL; Ret							13th	4	5th	11
2000	SEAT Cordoba WRC Evo3	8	(Finland) Toni Gardemeister									FIN; Ret	CYP; Ret	FRA; 11	ITA; Ret	AUS; 6	GBR; 12	13th	4	5th	11
2000	SEAT Cordoba WRC Evo2	17	(Finland) Harri Rovanperä	MON	SWE; 12	KEN	POR	ESP	ARG	GRC	NZL							9th*	7*	5th	11
2000	SEAT Cordoba WRC Evo3	17	(Finland) Harri Rovanperä									FIN	CYP	FRA	ITA	AUS	GBR; 10	9th*	7*	5th	11
2000	SEAT Cordoba WRC Evo3	20	(United Kingdom) Gwyndaf Evans	MON	SWE	KEN	POR	ESP	ARG	GRC	NZL	FIN	CYP	FRA	ITA	AUS	GBR; Ret	-	0	5th	11
2001	SEAT Cordoba WRC Evo3	-	(Spain) Marc Blázquez	MON	SWE	POR; 16	ESP; Ret	ARG; Ret	CYP; Ret	GRC	KEN	FIN	NZL	ITA	FRA	AUS	GBR	–	0	-	0
2001	SEAT Cordoba WRC Evo3	21	(Spain) Salvador Cañellas Jr.	MON	SWE	POR	ESP; Ret	ARG	CYP	GRC	KEN	FIN	NZL	ITA	FRA	AUS	GBR	–	0	-	0
2001	SEAT Cordoba WRC Evo3	24	(United Kingdom) Gwyndaf Evans	MON	SWE	POR	ESP	ARG	CYP	GRC	KEN	FIN	NZL	ITA	FRA	AUS	GBR; Ret	–	0	-	0
