= 2000 Rallye de Portugal =

4th round of the 2000 World Rally Championship

2000 Rallye de Portugal 34th TAP Rallye de Portugal
Round 4 of the 2000 World Rally Championship season
← Previous event	Next event →
- Host country: Portugal
- Rally base: Matosinhos
- Dates run: March 16 2000 – March 19 2000
- Stages: 23 (398.35 km; 247.52 miles)
- Stage surface: Gravel
- Overall distance: 1,646.96 km (1,023.37 miles)

Statistics
- Crews: 114 at start, 48 at finish

Overall results
- Overall winner: (United Kingdom) Richard Burns (United Kingdom) Robert Reid (Japan) Subaru World Rally Team; Subaru Impreza S6 WRC '00

The 2000 Rallye de Portugal (formally the 34th TAP Rallye de Portugal) was the fourth round of the 2000 World Rally Championship. The race was held over four days between 16 March and 19 March 2000, and was won by Subaru's Richard Burns, his 7th win in the World Rally Championship and second in a row this season.

== Background ==
=== Entry list ===
No.	Driver	Co-Driver	Entrant	Car	Tyre
World Rally Championship manufacturer entries
1	(Finland) Tommi Mäkinen	(Finland) Risto Mannisenmäki	(Japan) Marlboro Mitsubishi Ralliart	Mitsubishi Lancer Evo VI	MI
2	(Belgium) Freddy Loix	(Belgium) Sven Smeets	(Japan) Marlboro Mitsubishi Ralliart	Mitsubishi Carisma GT Evo VI	MI
3	(United Kingdom) Richard Burns	(United Kingdom) Robert Reid	(Japan) Subaru World Rally Team	Subaru Impreza S6 WRC '00	P
4	(Finland) Juha Kankkunen	(Finland) Juha Repo	(Japan) Subaru World Rally Team	Subaru Impreza S6 WRC '00	P
5	(United Kingdom) Colin McRae	(United Kingdom) Nicky Grist	(United Kingdom) Ford Motor Co. Ltd.	Ford Focus RS WRC '00	MI
6	(Spain) Carlos Sainz	(Spain) Luis Moya	(United Kingdom) Ford Motor Co. Ltd.	Ford Focus RS WRC '00	MI
7	(France) Didier Auriol	(France) Denis Giraudet	(Spain) SEAT Sport	SEAT Córdoba WRC Evo2	P
8	(Finland) Toni Gardemeister	(Finland) Paavo Lukander	(Spain) SEAT Sport	SEAT Córdoba WRC Evo2	P
9	(France) François Delecour	(France) Daniel Grataloup	(France) Peugeot Esso	Peugeot 206 WRC	MI
10	(Finland) Marcus Grönholm	(Finland) Timo Rautiainen	(France) Peugeot Esso	Peugeot 206 WRC	MI
11	(Germany) Armin Schwarz	(Germany) Manfred Hiemer	(Czech Republic) Škoda Motorsport	Škoda Octavia WRC	MI
12	(Spain) Luis Climent Asensio	(Spain) Álex Romaní	(Czech Republic) Škoda Motorsport	Škoda Octavia WRC	MI
14	(Sweden) Kenneth Eriksson	(Sweden) Staffan Parmander	(South Korea) Hyundai Castrol World Rally Team	Hyundai Accent WRC	MI
15	(United Kingdom) Alister McRae	(United Kingdom) David Senior	(South Korea) Hyundai Castrol World Rally Team	Hyundai Accent WRC	MI
World Rally Championship entries
16	(Finland) Harri Rovanperä	(Finland) Risto Pietiläinen	(Italy) H.F. Grifone SRL	Toyota Corolla WRC	—N/a
19	(Norway) Petter Solberg	(United Kingdom) Phil Mills	(United Kingdom) Ford Motor Co. Ltd.	Ford Focus RS WRC '00	MI
20	(Sweden) Thomas Rådström	(Sweden) Jörgen Skallman	(Sweden) Thomas Rådström	Toyota Corolla WRC	MI
21	(Portugal) Pedro Matos Chaves	(Portugal) Sérgio Paiva	(Portugal) Telecel Castrol Team	Toyota Corolla WRC	—N/a
22	(Portugal) Adruzilo Lopes	(Portugal) Luís Lisboa	(Portugal) Peugeot Esso Silver Team SG	Peugeot 206 WRC	—N/a
23	(Portugal) Rui Madeira	(Portugal) Fernando Prata	(Portugal) SEAT Hertz Team	SEAT Córdoba WRC Evo2	—N/a
24	(France) Frédéric Dor	(France) Didier Breton	(France) F. Dor Rally Team	Subaru Impreza S5 WRC '99	—N/a
25	(Estonia) Markko Märtin	(United Kingdom) Michael Park	(Estonia) Lukoil EOS Rally Team	Toyota Corolla WRC	—N/a
26	(Poland) Krzysztof Hołowczyc	(Belgium) Jean-Marc Fortin	(Poland) Wizja TV / Turning Point RT	Subaru Impreza S5 WRC '99	MI
27	(Finland) Pasi Hagström	(Finland) Tero Gardemeister	(Finland) Pasi Hagström	Toyota Corolla WRC	—N/a
28	(Finland) Janne Tuohino	(Finland) Miikka Anttila	(Finland) Janne Tuohino	Toyota Corolla WRC	—N/a
29	(Saudi Arabia) Abdullah Bakhashab	(United Kingdom) Bobby Willis	Toyota Team Saudi Arabia	Toyota Corolla WRC	MI
30	(Greece) Armodios Vovos	(Greece) Ioánnis Alvanos	(Greece) Armodios Vovos	Toyota Corolla WRC	—N/a
31	(Greece) Ioannis Papadimitriou	(Greece) Nikolaos Petropoulos	(Greece) Ioannis Papadimitriou	Subaru Impreza S5 WRC '98	MI
32	(Poland) Janusz Kulig	(Poland) Jarosław Baran	(Poland) Marlboro Ford Mobil 1 Team	Ford Focus WRC '99	P
33	(Norway) Henning Solberg	(Norway) Runar Pedersen	(Norway) Henning Solberg	Ford Escort WRC	—N/a
34	(Turkey) Serkan Yazici	(Turkey) Erkan Bodur	(Turkey) Team Atakan	Toyota Corolla WRC	—N/a
45	(Portugal) Gustavo Louro	(Portugal) Tiago Azevedo	(Portugal) Gustavo Louro	Ford Escort RS Cosworth	—N/a
46	(United Kingdom) Roger Duckworth	(United Kingdom) Mark Broomfield	(United Kingdom) Roger Duckworth	Subaru Impreza 555	—N/a
47	(Portugal) Manuel Ferreira da Silva	(Portugal) Jorge Amorim	(Portugal) Manuel Ferreira da Silva	Ford Escort RS Cosworth	—N/a
71	(Portugal) José Cunha	(Portugal) José Nunes	(Portugal) José Cunha	Subaru Impreza WRX	—N/a
72	(United Kingdom) Nigel Heath	(United Kingdom) Jeff Ashfield	(United Kingdom) Nigel Heath	Subaru Impreza WRX	—N/a
73	(Portugal) Luís Fonseca	(Portugal) Miguel Soares	(Portugal) Luís Fonseca	Ford Escort RS Cosworth	—N/a
74	(Poland) Tomasz Kuchar	(Poland) Maciej Szczepaniak	(Poland) Tomasz Kuchar	Toyota Celica GT-Four (ST205)	MI
76	(France) Pierre Colard	(France) Gilles Mondésir	(France) Pierre Colard	Subaru Impreza 555	—N/a
93	(Portugal) Luís Moniz	(Portugal) António Freitas	(Portugal) Luís Moniz	Mercedes-Benz 190E 2.3 16V	—N/a
Group N Cup entries
17	(Uruguay) Gustavo Trelles	(Argentina) Jorge Del Buono	(Uruguay) Gustavo Trelles	Mitsubishi Lancer Evo VI	—N/a
18	(Spain) Jesús Puras	(Spain) Marc Martí	(Spain) Jesús Puras	Mitsubishi Carisma GT Evo VI	MI
37	(Portugal) Miguel Campos	(Portugal) Carlos Magalhães	(Portugal) Mitsubishi Galp	Mitsubishi Carisma GT Evo VI	MI
38	(Austria) Manfred Stohl	(Austria) Peter Müller	(Austria) Manfred Stohl	Mitsubishi Lancer Evo VI	P
39	(Germany) Uwe Nittel	(Germany) Detlef Ruf	(Germany) Uwe Nittel	Mitsubishi Lancer Evo VI	—N/a
40	(Argentina) Roberto Sanchez	(Argentina) Ruben Garcia	(Argentina) Roberto Sanchez	Subaru Impreza WRX	—N/a
41	(Italy) Gianluigi Galli	(Italy) Nicola Arena	(Italy) Vieffe Corse SRL	Mitsubishi Lancer Evo V	—N/a
43	(Uruguay) Gabriel Mendez	(Uruguay) Daniel Muzio	(Uruguay) Gabriel Mendez	Mitsubishi Lancer Evo V	—N/a
44	(Argentina) Claudio Marcelo Menzi	(Argentina) Edgardo Galindo	(Argentina) Claudio Marcelo Menzi	Mitsubishi Lancer Evo VI	—N/a
50	(Peru) Ramón Ferreyros	(Peru) Gonzalo Saenz	(Peru) Ramón Ferreyros	Mitsubishi Lancer Evo VI	—N/a
51	(Belgium) Bob Colsoul	(Belgium) Tom Colsoul	(Belgium) Bob Colsoul	Mitsubishi Lancer Evo V	—N/a
52	(United States) John Buffum	(United Kingdom) Neil Wilson	(United States) John Buffum	Mitsubishi Lancer Evo V	—N/a
53	(Italy) Giovanni Manfrinato	(Italy) Claudio Condotta	(Italy) Giovanni Manfrinato	Mitsubishi Lancer Evo VI	—N/a
54	(Portugal) Pedro Leal	(Portugal) Redwan Cassamo	(Portugal) Creditus/BPN Rent	Mitsubishi Lancer Evo VI	—N/a
55	(Argentina) Gabriel Pozzo	(Argentina) Rodolfo Amelio Ortiz	(Argentina) Gabriel Pozzo	Mitsubishi Lancer Evo VI	—N/a
56	(Portugal) Vítor Pascoal	(Portugal) Duarte Costa	(Portugal) Vítor Pascoal	Mitsubishi Lancer Evo VI	—N/a
57	(Portugal) Pedro Dias da Silva	(Portugal) Mário Castro	(Portugal) Optiroc Competição	Mitsubishi Lancer Evo V	—N/a
58	(Portugal) Américo Antunes	(Portugal) Paulo Moura	(Portugal) Américo Antunes	Mitsubishi Lancer Evo IV	—N/a
59	(Portugal) Pedro Cunha e Carmo	(Portugal) Filipe Fernandes	(Portugal) Pedro Cunha e Carmo	Subaru Impreza WRX	—N/a
60	(Belgium) Damien Chaballe	(Belgium) André Leyh	(Belgium) Damien Chaballe	Subaru Impreza WRX STI	—N/a
61	(Portugal) Bruno Magalhães	(Portugal) José Martins	(Portugal) Bruno Magalhães	Mitsubishi Carisma GT Evo V	—N/a
62	(Portugal) José Pedro Santos	(Portugal) Manuel Fortuna	(Portugal) José Pedro Santos	Mitsubishi Lancer Evo V	—N/a
63	(Spain) Manuel Muniente	(Spain) Diego Vallejo	(Spain) Manuel Muniente	Mitsubishi Lancer Evo VI	—N/a
65	(Portugal) Manuel Rolo	(Portugal) Luís Ramalho	(Portugal) Manuel Rolo	Mitsubishi Lancer Evo VI	—N/a
66	(Portugal) Carlos Marques	(Portugal) Luís Cavaleiro	(Portugal) Carlos Marques	Mitsubishi Lancer Evo III	—N/a
67	(Belgium) Joost Boxoen	(Belgium) Stéphane Prévot	(Belgium) Joost Boxoen	Mitsubishi Lancer Evo IV	—N/a
68	(France) Pierre Bos	(France) Marlène Marché	(France) Pierre Bos	Mitsubishi Lancer Evo V	—N/a
69	(Belgium) David Loix	(Belgium) Cédric Pirotte	(Belgium) David Loix	Mitsubishi Lancer Evo V	—N/a
70	(Portugal) Arlindo Quintas	(Portugal) João Mendes	(Portugal) Arlindo Quintas	Mitsubishi Carisma GT Evo IV	—N/a
77	(Spain) José Luis Ascarza	(Spain) Antonio Gómez	(Spain) José Luis Ascarza	Mitsubishi Lancer Evo VI	—N/a
78	(France) Olivier Privé	(France) Lionel Satta	(France) Olivier Privé	Mitsubishi Lancer Evo VI	—N/a
79	(United Kingdom) Mark I'Anson	(United Kingdom) Graeme Walker	(United Kingdom) Mark I'Anson	Mitsubishi Lancer Evo V	—N/a
80	(Portugal) Nuno David Sousa	(Portugal) Rui Tavares	(Portugal) Nuno David Sousa	Ford Escort RS Cosworth	—N/a
81	(Spain) Ignacio Sanfilippo	(Spain) José Vicente Medina	(Spain) Ignacio Sanfilippo	Mitsubishi Lancer Evo VI	—N/a
82	(Portugal) António Gravato	(Portugal) Carlos Tenreiro	(Portugal) António Gravato	Ford Escort RS Cosworth	—N/a
83	(United Kingdom) John Lloyd	(United Kingdom) Paul Amandini	(United Kingdom) John Lloyd	Subaru Impreza	—N/a
84	(Portugal) Serafim Martins	(Portugal) João Lopes	(Portugal) Serafim Martins	Mitsubishi Lancer Evo III	—N/a
85	(Russia) Stanislav Gryazin	(Russia) Dmitriy Eremeev	(Russia) Stanislav Gryazin	Mitsubishi Lancer Evo VI	—N/a
86	(United Kingdom) Richard Tuthill	(Australia) Glenn Macneall	(United Kingdom) Richard Tuthill	Subaru Impreza WRX	—N/a
88	(Portugal) Paulo Freire	(Portugal) Armando Veiga	(Portugal) Paulo Freire	Toyota Celica GT-Four (ST205)	—N/a
89	(Portugal) Rodrigo Ferreira	(Portugal) Paulo Silva	(Portugal) Rodrigo Ferreira	Mitsubishi Lancer Evo IV	—N/a
90	(Portugal) Jorge Pinto	(Portugal) Luís Pinto	(Portugal) Jorge Pinto	Ford Escort RS Cosworth	—N/a
91	(Italy) Marta Candian	(Italy) Mara Biotti	(Italy) Marta Candian	Mitsubishi Lancer Evo V	—N/a
92	(Portugal) José Pereira	(Portugal) Franco Pereira	(Portugal) José Pereira	Subaru Impreza WRX	—N/a
118	(Portugal) José Pedro Miranda	(Portugal) Henrique Reis	(Portugal) José Pedro Miranda	SEAT Ibiza 1.8 GTi 16V	—N/a
119	(Portugal) Sergio Real	(Portugal) Hugo Amorim	(Portugal) Sergio Real	Toyota Starlet	—N/a
120	(Portugal) Filipe Silva	(Portugal) Fernando Horta	(Portugal) Filipe Silva	Peugeot 106 Rallye	—N/a

=== Itinerary ===
All dates and times are WET (UTC±0).

Date	Time	No.	Stage name	Distance
Leg 1 — 158.80 km
16 March	17:30	SS1	Baltar	3.20 km
17 March	07:25	SS2	Fafe — Lameirinha 1	15.16 km
17 March	07:50	SS3	Luílhas 1	11.39 km
17 March	08:45	SS4	Cabreira 1	26.68 km
17 March	10:45	SS5	Fafe — Lameirinha 2	15.16 km
17 March	11:10	SS6	Luílhas 2	11.39 km
17 March	12:05	SS7	Cabreira 2	26.68 km
17 March	13:36	SS8	Viso — Celorico de Basto	11.77 km
17 March	14:31	SS9	Fridão	14.20 km
17 March	15:21	SS10	Aboboreira	17.87 km
17 March	18:00	SS11	Lousada	5.30 km
Leg 2 — 179.25 km
18 March	09:15	SS12	Piódão 1	24.78 km
18 March	10:18	SS13	Arganil 1	14.27 km
18 March	10:46	SS14	Salgueiro — Góis 1	19.62 km
18 March	13:10	SS15	Piódão 2	24.78 km
18 March	14:13	SS16	Arganil 2	14.27 km
18 March	14:41	SS17	Salgueiro — Góis 2	19.62 km
18 March	16:28	SS18	Tábua	13.40 km
18 March	17:23	SS19	Aguieira	23.13 km
18 March	18:00	SS20	Mortazel — Mortágua	25.38 km
Leg 3 — 60.30 km
19 March	07:33	SS21	Ponte de Lima Este	23.49 km
19 March	08:28	SS22	Ponte de Lima Oeste	25.66 km
19 March	09:33	SS23	Ponte de Lima Sul	11.15 km

== Results ==
=== Overall ===
Pos.	No.	Driver	Co-driver	Team	Car	Time	Difference	Points
1	3	(United Kingdom) Richard Burns	(United Kingdom) Robert Reid	(Japan) Subaru World Rally Team	Subaru Impreza S6 WRC '00	4:34:00.0		10
2	10	(Finland) Marcus Grönholm	(Finland) Timo Rautiainen	(France) Peugeot Esso	Peugeot 206 WRC	4:34:06.5	+6.5	6
3	6	(Spain) Carlos Sainz	(Spain) Luis Moya	(United Kingdom) Ford Motor Co. Ltd.	Ford Focus RS WRC '00	4:36:09.2	+2:09.2	4
4	16	(Finland) Harri Rovanperä	(Finland) Risto Pietiläinen	(Italy) H.F. Grifone SRL	Toyota Corolla WRC	4:37:18.2	+3:18.2	3
5	9	(France) François Delecour	(France) Daniel Grataloup	(France) Peugeot Esso	Peugeot 206 WRC	4:38:06.3	+4:06.3	2
6	2	(Belgium) Freddy Loix	(Belgium) Sven Smeets	(Japan) Marlboro Mitsubishi Ralliart	Mitsubishi Carisma GT Evo VI	4:41:28.9	+7:28.9	1

=== World Rally Cars ===
==== Classification ====
Position		No.	Driver	Co-driver	Entrant	Car	Time	Difference	Points
Event	Class	No.	Driver	Co-driver	Entrant	Car	Time	Difference	Points
1	1	3	(United Kingdom) Richard Burns	(United Kingdom) Robert Reid	(Japan) Subaru World Rally Team	Subaru Impreza S6 WRC '00	4:34:00.0		10
2	2	10	(Finland) Marcus Grönholm	(Finland) Timo Rautiainen	(France) Peugeot Esso	Peugeot 206 WRC	4:34:06.5	+6.5	6
3	3	6	(Spain) Carlos Sainz	(Spain) Luis Moya	(United Kingdom) Ford Motor Co. Ltd.	Ford Focus RS WRC '00	4:36:09.2	+2:09.2	4
4	5	9	(France) François Delecour	(France) Daniel Grataloup	(France) Peugeot Esso	Peugeot 206 WRC	4:38:06.3	+4:06.3	2
5	6	2	(Belgium) Freddy Loix	(Belgium) Sven Smeets	(Japan) Marlboro Mitsubishi Ralliart	Mitsubishi Carisma GT Evo VI	4:41:28.9	+7:28.9	1
6	8	11	(Germany) Armin Schwarz	(Germany) Manfred Hiemer	(Czech Republic) Škoda Motorsport	Škoda Octavia WRC	4:41:47.4	+7:47.4	0
7	9	8	(Finland) Toni Gardemeister	(Finland) Paavo Lukander	(Spain) SEAT Sport	SEAT Córdoba WRC Evo2	4:42:24.2	+8:24.2	0
8	10	7	(France) Didier Auriol	(France) Denis Giraudet	(Spain) SEAT Sport	SEAT Córdoba WRC Evo2	4:46:38.0	+12:38.0	0
9	12	12	(Spain) Luis Climent Asensio	(Spain) Álex Romaní	(Czech Republic) Škoda Motorsport	Škoda Octavia WRC	4:50:10.0	+16:10.0	0
Retired SS14		14	(Sweden) Kenneth Eriksson	(Sweden) Staffan Parmander	(South Korea) Hyundai Castrol World Rally Team	Hyundai Accent WRC	Clutch		0
Retired SS9		1	(Finland) Tommi Mäkinen	(Finland) Risto Mannisenmäki	(Japan) Marlboro Mitsubishi Ralliart	Mitsubishi Lancer Evo VI	Accident		0
Retired SS9		5	(United Kingdom) Colin McRae	(United Kingdom) Nicky Grist	(United Kingdom) Ford Motor Co. Ltd.	Ford Focus RS WRC '00	Engine		0
Retired SS4		4	(Finland) Juha Kankkunen	(Finland) Juha Repo	(Japan) Subaru World Rally Team	Subaru Impreza S6 WRC '00	Suspension		0
Retired SS4		15	(United Kingdom) Alister McRae	(United Kingdom) David Senior	(South Korea) Hyundai Castrol World Rally Team	Hyundai Accent WRC	Transmission		0

==== Special stages ====
Day	Stage	Stage name	Length	Winner	Car	Time	Class leaders
Leg 1 (16 Mar)	SS1	Baltar	3.20 km	(Finland) Marcus Grönholm	Peugeot 206 WRC	3:06.2	(Finland) Marcus Grönholm
Leg 1 (17 Mar)	SS2	Fafe — Lameirinha 1	15.16 km	(United Kingdom) Colin McRae	Ford Focus RS WRC '00	9:58.6	(United Kingdom) Colin McRae
Leg 1 (17 Mar)	SS3	Luílhas 1	11.39 km	(United Kingdom) Richard Burns	Subaru Impreza S6 WRC '00	8:29.5	(United Kingdom) Colin McRae
Leg 1 (17 Mar)	SS4	Cabreira 1	26.68 km	(United Kingdom) Richard Burns	Subaru Impreza S6 WRC '00	17:41.3	(United Kingdom) Richard Burns
Leg 1 (17 Mar)	SS5	Fafe — Lameirinha 2	15.16 km	(United Kingdom) Colin McRae	Ford Focus RS WRC '00	9:52.4	(United Kingdom) Richard Burns
Leg 1 (17 Mar)	SS6	Luílhas 2	11.39 km	(United Kingdom) Richard Burns	Subaru Impreza S6 WRC '00	8:24.2	(United Kingdom) Richard Burns
Leg 1 (17 Mar)	SS7	Cabreira 2	26.68 km	(United Kingdom) Richard Burns	Subaru Impreza S6 WRC '00	17:42.5	(United Kingdom) Richard Burns
Leg 1 (17 Mar)	SS8	Viso — Celorico de Basto	11.77 km	(Finland) Harri Rovanperä	Toyota Corolla WRC	7:31.5	(United Kingdom) Richard Burns
Leg 1 (17 Mar)	SS9	Fridão	14.20 km	(Spain) Carlos Sainz	Ford Focus RS WRC '00	10:25.4	(Finland) Marcus Grönholm
Leg 1 (17 Mar)	SS10	Aboboreira	17.87 km	(Spain) Carlos Sainz	Ford Focus RS WRC '00	12:18.7	(Finland) Marcus Grönholm
Leg 1 (17 Mar)	SS11	Lousada	5.30 km	(France) François Delecour	Peugeot 206 WRC	3:59.1	(Finland) Marcus Grönholm
Leg 2 (18 Mar)	SS12	Piódão 1	24.78 km	(United Kingdom) Richard Burns	Subaru Impreza S6 WRC '00	16:46.0	(Finland) Marcus Grönholm
Leg 2 (18 Mar)	SS13	Arganil 1	14.27 km	(United Kingdom) Richard Burns	Subaru Impreza S6 WRC '00	9:39.6	(Finland) Marcus Grönholm
Leg 2 (18 Mar)	SS14	Salgueiro — Góis 1	19.62 km	(United Kingdom) Richard Burns	Subaru Impreza S6 WRC '00	11:24.0	(Finland) Marcus Grönholm
Leg 2 (18 Mar)	SS15	Piódão 2	24.78 km	(Norway) Petter Solberg	Ford Focus RS WRC '00	17:09.6	(Finland) Marcus Grönholm
Leg 2 (18 Mar)	SS16	Arganil 2	14.27 km	(United Kingdom) Richard Burns	Subaru Impreza S6 WRC '00	9:49.9	(Finland) Marcus Grönholm
Leg 2 (18 Mar)	SS17	Salgueiro — Góis 2	19.62 km	(United Kingdom) Richard Burns	Subaru Impreza S6 WRC '00	11:24.0	(United Kingdom) Richard Burns
Leg 2 (18 Mar)	SS18	Tábua	13.40 km	(Spain) Carlos Sainz	Ford Focus RS WRC '00	8:35.9	(United Kingdom) Richard Burns
Leg 2 (18 Mar)	SS19	Aguieira	23.13 km	(Finland) Marcus Grönholm	Peugeot 206 WRC	16:59.6	(Finland) Marcus Grönholm
Leg 2 (18 Mar)	SS20	Mortazel — Mortágua	25.38 km	(Finland) Marcus Grönholm	Peugeot 206 WRC	17:17.7	(Finland) Marcus Grönholm
Leg 3 (19 Mar)	SS21	Ponte de Lima Este	23.49 km	(United Kingdom) Richard Burns	Subaru Impreza S6 WRC '00	15:58.9	(Finland) Marcus Grönholm
Leg 3 (19 Mar)	SS22	Ponte de Lima Oeste	25.66 km	(United Kingdom) Richard Burns	Subaru Impreza S6 WRC '00	19:04.2	(United Kingdom) Richard Burns
Leg 3 (19 Mar)	SS23	Ponte de Lima Sul	11.15 km	(United Kingdom) Richard Burns	Subaru Impreza S6 WRC '00	8:12.9	(United Kingdom) Richard Burns

==== Championship standings ====
Pos.	Drivers' championships			Co-drivers' championships			Manufacturers' championships		
Pos.	Move	Driver	Points	Move	Co-driver	Points	Move	Manufacturer	Points
1	2	(United Kingdom) Richard Burns	22	2	(United Kingdom) Robert Reid	22		(Japan) Subaru World Rally Team	35
2	1	(Finland) Tommi Mäkinen	16	1	(Finland) Risto Mannisenmäki	16	2	(France) Peugeot Esso	20
3	1	(Finland) Marcus Grönholm	16	1	(Finland) Timo Rautiainen	16	1	(Japan) Marlboro Mitsubishi Ralliart	20
4	1	(Spain) Carlos Sainz	13	1	(Spain) Luis Moya	13	1	(United Kingdom) Ford Motor Co. Ltd.	17
5	2	(Finland) Juha Kankkunen	11	2	(Finland) Juha Repo	11		(Spain) SEAT Sport	7

=== FIA Cup for Production Rally Drivers ===
==== Classification ====
Position		No.	Driver	Co-driver	Entrant	Car	Time	Difference	Points
Event	Class	No.	Driver	Co-driver	Entrant	Car	Time	Difference	Points
15	1	37	(Portugal) Miguel Campos	(Portugal) Carlos Magalhães	(Portugal) Mitsubishi Galp	Mitsubishi Carisma GT Evo VI	4:58:02.5		10
17	2	38	(Austria) Manfred Stohl	(Austria) Peter Müller	(Austria) Manfred Stohl	Mitsubishi Lancer Evo VI	5:01:47.9	+3:45.4	6
18	3	50	(Peru) Ramón Ferreyros	(Peru) Gonzalo Saenz	(Peru) Ramón Ferreyros	Mitsubishi Lancer Evo VI	5:06:49.5	+8:47.0	4
20	4	57	(Portugal) Pedro Dias da Silva	(Portugal) Mário Castro	(Portugal) Optiroc Competição	Mitsubishi Lancer Evo V	5:10:58.5	+12:56.0	3
21	5	58	(Portugal) Américo Antunes	(Portugal) Paulo Moura	(Portugal) Américo Antunes	Mitsubishi Lancer Evo IV	5:13:06.7	+15:04.2	2
23	6	56	(Portugal) Vítor Pascoal	(Portugal) Duarte Costa	(Portugal) Vítor Pascoal	Mitsubishi Lancer Evo VI	5:17:13.5	+19:11.0	1
24	7	65	(Portugal) Manuel Rolo	(Portugal) Luís Ramalho	(Portugal) Manuel Rolo	Mitsubishi Lancer Evo VI	5:22:26.0	+24:23.5	0
25	8	59	(Portugal) Pedro Cunha e Carmo	(Portugal) Filipe Fernandes	(Portugal) Pedro Cunha e Carmo	Subaru Impreza WRX	5:27:39.5	+29:37.0	0
26	9	52	(United States) John Buffum	(United Kingdom) Neil Wilson	(United States) John Buffum	Mitsubishi Lancer Evo V	5:28:02.9	+30:00.4	0
29	10	70	(Portugal) Arlindo Quintas	(Portugal) João Mendes	(Portugal) Arlindo Quintas	Mitsubishi Carisma GT Evo IV	5:38:01.2	+39:58.7	0
30	11	89	(Portugal) Rodrigo Ferreira	(Portugal) Paulo Silva	(Portugal) Rodrigo Ferreira	Mitsubishi Lancer Evo IV	5:42:45.5	+44:43.0	0
31	12	81	(Spain) Ignacio Sanfilippo	(Spain) José Vicente Medina	(Spain) Ignacio Sanfilippo	Mitsubishi Lancer Evo VI	5:46:12.0	+48:09.5	0
32	13	61	(Portugal) Bruno Magalhães	(Portugal) José Martins	(Portugal) Bruno Magalhães	Mitsubishi Carisma GT Evo V	5:48:35.8	+50:33.3	0
33	14	78	(France) Olivier Privé	(France) Lionel Satta	(France) Olivier Privé	Mitsubishi Lancer Evo VI	5:51:20.2	+53:17.7	0
35	15	92	(Portugal) José Pereira	(Portugal) Franco Pereira	(Portugal) José Pereira	Subaru Impreza WRX	5:55:01.8	+56:59.3	0
36	16	66	(Portugal) Carlos Marques	(Portugal) Luís Cavaleiro	(Portugal) Carlos Marques	Mitsubishi Lancer Evo III	5:55:24.9	+57:22.4	0
42	17	62	(Portugal) José Pedro Santos	(Portugal) Manuel Fortuna	(Portugal) José Pedro Santos	Mitsubishi Lancer Evo V	6:21:30.8	+1:23:28.3	0
47	18	118	(Portugal) José Pedro Miranda	(Portugal) Henrique Reis	(Portugal) José Pedro Miranda	SEAT Ibiza 1.8 GTi 16V	6:40:28.9	+1:42:26.4	0
48	19	120	(Portugal) Filipe Silva	(Portugal) Fernando Horta	(Portugal) Filipe Silva	Peugeot 106 Rallye	7:28:33.2	+2:30:30.7	0
Retired SS22		40	(Argentina) Roberto Sanchez	(Argentina) Ruben Garcia	(Argentina) Roberto Sanchez	Subaru Impreza WRX	Mechanical		0
Retired SS22		44	(Argentina) Claudio Marcelo Menzi	(Argentina) Edgardo Galindo	(Argentina) Claudio Marcelo Menzi	Mitsubishi Lancer Evo VI	Accident		0
Retired SS22		55	(Argentina) Gabriel Pozzo	(Argentina) Rodolfo Amelio Ortiz	(Argentina) Gabriel Pozzo	Mitsubishi Lancer Evo VI	Transmission		0
Retired SS21		63	(Spain) Manuel Muniente	(Spain) Diego Vallejo	(Spain) Manuel Muniente	Mitsubishi Lancer Evo VI	Mechanical		0
Retired SS19		60	(Belgium) Damien Chaballe	(Belgium) André Leyh	(Belgium) Damien Chaballe	Subaru Impreza WRX STI	Mechanical		0
Retired SS18		67	(Belgium) Joost Boxoen	(Belgium) Stéphane Prévot	(Belgium) Joost Boxoen	Mitsubishi Lancer Evo IV	Mechanical		0
Retired SS17		79	(United Kingdom) Mark l'Anson	(United Kingdom) Graeme Walker	(United Kingdom) Mark l'Anson	Mitsubishi Lancer Evo V	Mechanical		0
Retired SS17		84	(Portugal) Serafim Martins	(Portugal) João Lopes	(Portugal) Serafim Martins	Mitsubishi Lancer Evo III	Mechanical		0
Retired SS16		53	(Italy) Giovanni Manfrinato	(Italy) Claudio Condotta	(Italy) Giovanni Manfrinato	Mitsubishi Lancer Evo VI	Mechanical		0
Retired SS16		80	(Portugal) Nuno David Sousa	(Portugal) Rui Tavares	(Portugal) Nuno David Sousa	Ford Escort RS Cosworth	Mechanical		0
Retired SS15		17	(Uruguay) Gustavo Trelles	(Argentina) Jorge Del Buono	(Uruguay) Gustavo Trelles	Mitsubishi Lancer Evo VI	Mechanical		0
Retired SS15		51	(Belgium) Bob Colsoul	(Belgium) Tom Colsoul	(Belgium) Bob Colsoul	Mitsubishi Lancer Evo V	Mechanical		0
Retired SS14		39	(Germany) Uwe Nittel	(Germany) Detlef Ruf	(Germany) Uwe Nittel	Mitsubishi Lancer Evo VI	Mechanical		0
Retired SS13		54	(Portugal) Pedro Leal	(Portugal) Redwan Cassamo	(Portugal) Creditus/BPN Rent	Mitsubishi Lancer Evo VI	Rolled		0
Retired SS13		82	(Portugal) António Gravato	(Portugal) Carlos Tenreiro	(Portugal) António Gravato	Ford Escort RS Cosworth	Engine		0
Retired SS12		43	(Uruguay) Gabriel Mendez	(Uruguay) Daniel Muzio	(Uruguay) Gabriel Mendez	Mitsubishi Lancer Evo V	Mechanical		0
Retired SS12		69	(Belgium) David Loix	(Belgium) Cédric Pirotte	(Belgium) David Loix	Mitsubishi Lancer Evo V	Accident		0
Retired SS11		119	(Portugal) Sergio Real	(Portugal) Hugo Amorim	(Portugal) Sergio Real	Toyota Starlet	Mechanical		0
Retired SS9		68	(France) Pierre Bos	(France) Marlène Marché	(France) Pierre Bos	Mitsubishi Lancer Evo V	Mechanical		0
Retired SS7		88	(Portugal) Paulo Freire	(Portugal) Armando Veiga	(Portugal) Paulo Freire	Toyota Celica GT-Four (ST205)	Mechanical		0
Retired SS6		91	(Italy) Marta Candian	(Italy) Mara Biotti	(Italy) Marta Candian	Mitsubishi Lancer Evo V	Engine		0
Retired SS4		18	(Spain) Jesús Puras	(Spain) Marc Martí	(Spain) Jesús Puras	Mitsubishi Carisma GT Evo VI	Mechanical		0
Retired SS4		77	(Spain) José Luis Ascarza	(Spain) Antonio Gómez	(Spain) José Luis Ascarza	Mitsubishi Lancer Evo VI	Steering		0
Retired SS4		85	(Russia) Stanislav Gryazin	(Russia) Dmitriy Eremeev	(Russia) Stanislav Gryazin	Mitsubishi Lancer Evo VI	Accident		0
Retired SS4		86	(United Kingdom) Richard Tuthill	(Australia) Glenn Macneall	(United Kingdom) Richard Tuthill	Subaru Impreza WRX	Mechanical		0
Retired SS2		41	(Italy) Gianluigi Galli	(Italy) Nicola Arena	(Italy) Vieffe Corse SRL	Mitsubishi Lancer Evo V	Accident damage		0
Retired SS2		90	(Portugal) Jorge Pinto	(Portugal) Luís Pinto	(Portugal) Jorge Pinto	Ford Escort RS Cosworth	Fire		0
Retired SS1		83	(United Kingdom) John Lloyd	(United Kingdom) Paul Amandini	(United Kingdom) John Lloyd	Subaru Impreza	Mechanical		0

==== Special stages ====
Day	Stage	Stage name	Length	Winner	Car	Time	Class leaders
Leg 1 (16 Mar)	SS1	Baltar	3.20 km	(Austria) Manfred Stohl	Mitsubishi Lancer Evo VI	3:19.2	(Austria) Manfred Stohl
Leg 1 (17 Mar)	SS2	Fafe — Lameirinha 1	15.16 km	(Portugal) Miguel Campos	Mitsubishi Carisma GT Evo VI	10:32.7	(Austria) Manfred Stohl
Leg 1 (17 Mar)	SS3	Luílhas 1	11.39 km	(Austria) Manfred Stohl	Mitsubishi Lancer Evo VI	8:50.1	(Austria) Manfred Stohl
Leg 1 (17 Mar)	SS4	Cabreira 1	26.68 km	(Portugal) Miguel Campos	Mitsubishi Carisma GT Evo VI	18:41.7	(Austria) Manfred Stohl
Leg 1 (17 Mar)	SS5	Fafe — Lameirinha 2	15.16 km	(Portugal) Miguel Campos	Mitsubishi Carisma GT Evo VI	10:32.7	(Portugal) Miguel Campos
Leg 1 (17 Mar)	SS6	Luílhas 2	11.39 km	(Portugal) Miguel Campos	Mitsubishi Carisma GT Evo VI	8:55.5	(Portugal) Miguel Campos
Leg 1 (17 Mar)	SS7	Cabreira 2	26.68 km	(Portugal) Miguel Campos	Mitsubishi Carisma GT Evo VI	18:42.1	(Portugal) Miguel Campos
Leg 1 (17 Mar)	SS8	Viso — Celorico de Basto	11.77 km	(Austria) Manfred Stohl	Mitsubishi Lancer Evo VI	7:50.2	(Portugal) Miguel Campos
Leg 1 (17 Mar)	SS9	Fridão	14.20 km	(Germany) Uwe Nittel	Mitsubishi Lancer Evo VI	11:00.8	(Portugal) Miguel Campos
Leg 1 (17 Mar)	SS10	Aboboreira	17.87 km	(Germany) Uwe Nittel	Mitsubishi Lancer Evo VI	12:58.7	(Portugal) Miguel Campos
Leg 1 (17 Mar)	SS11	Lousada	5.30 km	(Portugal) Pedro Leal	Mitsubishi Lancer Evo VI	4:14.4	(Portugal) Miguel Campos
Leg 2 (18 Mar)	SS12	Piódão 1	24.78 km	(Germany) Uwe Nittel	Mitsubishi Lancer Evo VI	18:16.4	(Portugal) Miguel Campos
Leg 2 (18 Mar)	SS13	Arganil 1	14.27 km	(Portugal) Miguel Campos	Mitsubishi Carisma GT Evo VI	10:50.8	(Portugal) Miguel Campos
Leg 2 (18 Mar)	SS14	Salgueiro — Góis 1	19.62 km	(Portugal) Miguel Campos	Mitsubishi Carisma GT Evo VI	12:39.3	(Portugal) Miguel Campos
Leg 2 (18 Mar)	SS15	Piódão 2	24.78 km	(Argentina) Gabriel Pozzo	Mitsubishi Lancer Evo VI	19:20.2	(Portugal) Miguel Campos
Leg 2 (18 Mar)	SS16	Arganil 2	14.27 km	(Austria) Manfred Stohl	Mitsubishi Lancer Evo VI	11:07.2	(Portugal) Miguel Campos
Leg 2 (18 Mar)	SS17	Salgueiro — Góis 2	19.62 km	(Austria) Manfred Stohl	Mitsubishi Lancer Evo VI	12:45.7	(Portugal) Miguel Campos
Leg 2 (18 Mar)	SS18	Tábua	13.40 km	(Portugal) Miguel Campos	Mitsubishi Carisma GT Evo VI	9:10.5	(Portugal) Miguel Campos
Leg 2 (18 Mar)	SS19	Aguieira	23.13 km	(Portugal) Miguel Campos	Mitsubishi Carisma GT Evo VI	18:40.3	(Portugal) Miguel Campos
Leg 2 (18 Mar)	SS20	Mortazel — Mortágua	25.38 km	(Peru) Ramón Ferreyros	Mitsubishi Lancer Evo VI	19:33.7	(Portugal) Miguel Campos
Leg 3 (19 Mar)	SS21	Ponte de Lima Este	23.49 km	(Peru) Ramón Ferreyros	Mitsubishi Lancer Evo VI	17:24.6	(Portugal) Miguel Campos
Leg 3 (19 Mar)	SS22	Ponte de Lima Oeste	25.66 km	(Peru) Ramón Ferreyros	Mitsubishi Lancer Evo VI	20:59.3	(Portugal) Miguel Campos
Leg 3 (19 Mar)	SS23	Ponte de Lima Sul	11.15 km	(Portugal) Pedro Dias da Silva	Mitsubishi Lancer Evo V	9:16.8	(Portugal) Miguel Campos

==== Championship standings ====
Pos.	Drivers' championships		
Pos.	Move	Driver	Points
1		(Austria) Manfred Stohl	23
2		(Finland) Jani Paasonen	10
3		(Argentina) Claudio Marcelo Menzi	10
4	New entry	(Portugal) Miguel Campos	10
5	1	(Uruguay) Gustavo Trelles	6
