= 2000 Rally Australia =

13th round of the 2000 World Rally Championship

2000 Rally Australia Telstra Rally Australia
Round 13 of the 2000 World Rally Championship
← Previous event	Next event →
- Host country: Australia
- Rally base: Perth
- Dates run: November 9, 2000 – November 12, 2000
- Stages: 21 (391.17 km; 243.06 miles)
- Stage surface: Gravel

Overall results
- Overall winner: (Finland) Marcus Grönholm (France) Peugeot Esso (France) Peugeot 206 WRC

The 2000 Rally Australia (formally the 13th Telstra Rally Australia) was the thirteenth round of the 2000 World Rally Championship. The race was held over 4 days between 9 and 12 November 2000, and was won by Peugeot's Marcus Grönholm, his 4th win in the World Rally Championship.

== Background ==
=== Entry list ===
No.	Driver	Co-driver	Entrant	Car	Tyre
World Rally Championship manufacturer entries
1	(Finland) Tommi Mäkinen	(Finland) Risto Mannisenmäki	(Japan) Marlboro Mitsubishi Ralliart	Mitsubishi Lancer Evo VI	MI
2	(Belgium) Freddy Loix	(Belgium) Sven Smeets	(Japan) Marlboro Mitsubishi Ralliart	Mitsubishi Carisma GT Evo VI	MI
3	(United Kingdom) Richard Burns	(United Kingdom) Robert Reid	(Japan) Subaru World Rally Team	Subaru Impreza S6 WRC '00	P
4	(Finland) Juha Kankkunen	(Finland) Juha Repo	(Japan) Subaru World Rally Team	Subaru Impreza S6 WRC '00	P
5	(United Kingdom) Colin McRae	(United Kingdom) Nicky Grist	(United Kingdom) Ford Motor Co. Ltd.	Ford Focus RS WRC '00	MI
6	(Spain) Carlos Sainz	(Spain) Luis Moya	(United Kingdom) Ford Motor Co. Ltd.	Ford Focus RS WRC '00	MI
7	(France) Didier Auriol	(France) Denis Giraudet	(Spain) SEAT Sport	SEAT Córdoba WRC Evo3	P
8	(Finland) Toni Gardemeister	(Finland) Paavo Lukander	(Spain) SEAT Sport	SEAT Córdoba WRC Evo3	P
9	(France) François Delecour	(France) Daniel Grataloup	(France) Peugeot Esso	Peugeot 206 WRC	MI
10	(Finland) Marcus Grönholm	(Finland) Timo Rautiainen	(France) Peugeot Esso	Peugeot 206 WRC	MI
14	(Sweden) Kenneth Eriksson	(Sweden) Staffan Parmander	(South Korea) Hyundai Castrol WRT	Hyundai Accent WRC	MI
15	(United Kingdom) Alister McRae	(United Kingdom) David Mills	(South Korea) Hyundai Castrol WRT	Hyundai Accent WRC	MI
World Rally Championship entries
16	(France) Gilles Panizzi	(France) Hervé Panizzi	(France) Peugeot Esso	Peugeot 206 WRC	MI
17	(Norway) Petter Solberg	(United Kingdom) Phil Mills	(Japan) Subaru World Rally Team	Subaru Impreza S6 WRC '00	MI
18	(Estonia) Markko Märtin	(United Kingdom) Michael Park	(Estonia) Lukoil EOS Rally Team	Toyota Corolla WRC	P
19	(Finland) Tapio Laukkanen	(Finland) Kaj Lindström	(United Kingdom) Ford Motor Co. Ltd.	Ford Focus RS WRC '00	MI
20	(New Zealand) Possum Bourne	(New Zealand) Craig Vincent	Subaru Rally Team Australia	Subaru Impreza S5 WRC '98	-
21	(Japan) Katsuhiko Taguchi	(United Kingdom) Bobby Willis	(Japan) Team Advan Ralliart	Mitsubishi Lancer Evo VI	-
22	(Australia) Neal Bates	(Australia) Coral Taylor	(Australia) Neal Bates	Toyota Corolla WRC	-
23	(Australia) Michael Guest	(Australia) David Green	(South Korea) Hyundai Castrol WRT	Hyundai Accent WRC	MI
24	(Greece) Ioannis Papadimitriou	(United Kingdom) Chris Patterson	(Greece) Ioannis Papadimitriou	Subaru Impreza S5 WRC '99	-
25	(Turkey) Serkan Yazici	(Turkey) Erkan Bodur	(Turkey) Team Atakan	Toyota Corolla WRC	-
39	(Australia) Simon Evans	(Australia) Sue Evans	Volkswagen Motorsport Australia	Volkswagen Golf IV Kit Car	-
42	(Australia) Ross Mackenzie	(Australia) Paul van der Mey	(Australia) Ross Mackenzie	Mitsubishi Lancer Evo III	-
44	(Australia) Tolley Challis	(Australia) Elio Della Maddalena	(Australia) Tolley Challis	Mitsubishi Lancer Evo III	-
47	(Australia) Dennis Dunlop	(Australia) Jacquie Dunlop	(Australia) Dennis Dunlop	Mitsubishi Lancer Evo III	-
51	(Australia) Jacquiline Dines	(Australia) Julie Meridew	(Australia) Jacquiline Dines	Mitsubishi Lancer Evo III	-
52	(United Kingdom) John Lloyd	(United Kingdom) Pauline Gullick	(United Kingdom) John Lloyd	Mitsubishi Lancer Evo V	-
58	(Australia) Craig Dawson	(Australia) Brian Tiedemann	(Australia) Craig Dawson	Nissan Pulsar GTI-R	-
61	(Australia) Keith Hedgeland	(Australia) William Hayes	(Australia) Keith Hedgeland	Subaru Impreza 555	-
62	(Australia) Stephen Handbury	(Australia) Karl Francis	(Australia) Stephen Handbury	Subaru Impreza WRX	-
63	(United Kingdom) Nigel Heath	(United Kingdom) Steve Lancaster	(United Kingdom) Nigel Heath	Subaru Impreza WRC	-
64	(Australia) Ross Lockhart	(Australia) Daryll Judd	(Australia) Ross Lockhart	Mitsubishi Lancer Evo III	-
67	(Australia) Gavin Morgan	(Australia) Anthony Chudleigh	(Australia) Gavin Morgan	Subaru Legacy RS	-
68	(Australia) Mark Butcher	(Australia) Andrew Boyd	(Australia) Mark Butcher	Nissan Pulsar GTI-R	-
72	(Republic of Ireland) Andrew Hannigan	(Republic of Ireland) Patrick Hannigan	(Republic of Ireland) Andrew Hannigan	Daihatsu Charade GTi	-
79	(Australia) Robert Whyatt	(Australia) Paul Flintoft	(Australia) Robert Whyatt	Mitsubishi Lancer Evo III	-
83	(Australia) Brian Haggerty	(Australia) Clinton Fulford	(Australia) Brian Haggerty	Hyundai Lantra	-
Group N Cup entries
26	(Japan) Toshihiro Arai	(United Kingdom) Roger Freeman	(Japan) Spike Subaru Team	Subaru Impreza WRX	-
27	(Australia) Cody Crocker	(Australia) Greg Foletta	Subaru Rally Team Australia	Subaru Impreza WRX	-
28	(Austria) Manfred Stohl	(Austria) Peter Müller	(Austria) Manfred Stohl	Mitsubishi Lancer Evo VI	-
29	(Australia) Ed Ordynski	(Australia) Iain Stewart	(Australia) Ed Ordynski	Mitsubishi Lancer Evo VI	-
30	(Uruguay) Gustavo Trelles	(Argentina) Jorge Del Buono	(Uruguay) Gustavo Trelles	Mitsubishi Lancer Evo VI	MI
31	(Finland) Juha Kangas	(Finland) Mika Ovaskainen	(Finland) Juha Kangas	Mitsubishi Lancer Evo VI	-
33	(Finland) Jani Paasonen	(Finland) Jakke Honkanen	(Finland) Jani Paasonen	Mitsubishi Carisma GT VI	-
34	(Argentina) Gabriel Pozzo	(Argentina) Fabian Cretu	(Argentina) Gabriel Pozzo	Mitsubishi Lancer Evo VI	-
35	(Argentina) Claudio Marcelo Menzi	(Argentina) Edgardo Galindo	(Argentina) Claudio Marcelo Menzi	Mitsubishi Lancer Evo VI	-
36	(Italy) Giovanni Manfrinato	(Italy) Claudio Condotta	(Italy) Giovanni Manfrinato	Mitsubishi Lancer Evo VI	-
37	(Australia) Dean Herridge	(Australia) Glenn Macneall	(Australia) Maximum Motorsport	Subaru Impreza 555	-
38	(Italy) Nicola Caldani	(Italy) Claudio Condotta	(Italy) Nicola Caldani	Mitsubishi Lancer Evo IV	-
40	(France) Érik Comas	(France) Jean-Paul Terrasse	(France) Érik Comas	Mitsubishi Lancer Evo VI	-
41	(Australia) Spencer Lowndes	(Australia) Chris Randell	(Australia) Spencer Lowndes	Mitsubishi Lancer Evo VI	-
43	(Finland) Kaj Kuistila	(Finland) Kai Rantanen	(Finland) Kaj Kuistila	Mitsubishi Lancer Evo VI	-
45	(Japan) Osamu Yamaguchi	(Australia) Philip Dodd	(Japan) Osamu Yamaguchi	Mitsubishi Lancer Evo VI	-
46	(New Zealand) Reece Jones	(New Zealand) Leo Bult	(New Zealand) Reece Jones	Mitsubishi Lancer Evo VI	-
48	(United Kingdom) Julian Reynolds	(United Kingdom) Andrew Bull	(United Kingdom) Julian Reynolds	Mitsubishi Lancer Evo V	-
49	(New Zealand) Alex Stone	(New Zealand) Diana Madlener	(New Zealand) Alex Stone	Subaru Impreza WRX	-
50	(New Zealand) David Hill	(New Zealand) Sophie Handley	(New Zealand) Australian Plastic Profiles	Mitsubishi Lancer Evo V	-
53	(Japan) Haruo Takakuwa	(Japan) Hiroshi Suzuki	(Japan) Haruo Takakuwa	Subaru Impreza 555	-
54	(Belgium) Bob Colsoul	(Belgium) Tom Colsoul	(Belgium) Bob Colsoul	Mitsubishi Lancer Evo VI	-
55	(New Zealand) Michael Thompson	(New Zealand) Gordon Klebba	(New Zealand) Michael Thompson	Subaru Impreza WRX	-
56	(United Kingdom) Natalie Barratt	(United Kingdom) Paul Morris	(United Kingdom) Natalie Barratt	Subaru Impreza 555	-
57	(Japan) Michiyasu Endo	(Japan) Hiroyasu Sonoda	(Japan) Michiyasu Endo	Subaru Impreza 555	-
59	(New Zealand) Ben Grigsby	(New Zealand) Rick Grigsby	(New Zealand) Ben Grigsby	Subaru Impreza 555	-
60	(Japan) Toshimitsu Kuraoka	(New Zealand) Michael Hawiley	(New Zealand) Toshimitsu Kuraoka	Subaru Impreza 555	-
65	(New Zealand) Jim Marden	(New Zealand) Stuart Percival	(New Zealand) Jim Marden	Subaru Impreza 555	-
66	(Japan) Ryo Funaki	(Japan) Fumika Aoki	(Japan) Ryo Funaki	Subaru Impreza WRX	-
69	(Japan) Ichiro Nakano	(New Zealand) Rex Johnstone	(Japan) Ichiro Nakano	Subaru Impreza WRX	-
70	(New Zealand) Michael Anderson	(New Zealand) Melissa Anderson	(New Zealand) Michael Anderson	Mitsubishi Lancer Evo IV	-
71	(Japan) Wakujiro Kobayashi	(Japan) Keiji Seita	(Japan) Wakujiro Kobayashi	Mitsubishi Lancer Evo V	-
73	(New Zealand) Jason Walk	(New Zealand) Julian Graziani	(New Zealand) Jason Walk	Subaru Impreza 555	-
74	(New Zealand) Leo Iriks	(New Zealand) Julie Iriks	(New Zealand) Leo Iriks	Mitsubishi Lancer Evo III	-
75	(New Zealand) Stuart Waters	(New Zealand) Gray Marshall	(New Zealand) Stuart Waters	Nissan Sunny GTI	-
76	(Japan) Osamu Yoda	(New Zealand) Toni Feaver	(Japan) Osamu Yoda	Subaru Impreza WRX	-
77	(New Zealand) Bevan Phillips	(New Zealand) Reg Phillips	(New Zealand) Bevan Phillips	Hyundai Accent	-
78	(New Zealand) John Hendry	(New Zealand) Andrew Wilson	(New Zealand) John Hendry	Proton Satria	-
80	(New Zealand) Karl Drummond	(New Zealand) Paul Bennett	(New Zealand) Karl Drummond	Suzuki Swift GTi	-
81	(New Zealand) Dave King	(New Zealand) Mark Blume	(New Zealand) Dave King	Proton Satria	-
82	(New Zealand) Joseph Lombardo	(New Zealand) Nicole Paterson	(New Zealand) Joseph Lombardo	Proton Satria	-
84	(New Zealand) Tod Reed	(New Zealand) Brian Reed	(New Zealand) Tod Reed	Proton Satria	-
86	(New Zealand) John Rolfe	(New Zealand) Jeffrey Williams	(New Zealand) Office of Youth Affairs	Daihatsu Charade GTi	-
96	(New Zealand) John Creach	(New Zealand) Jonathon Mortimer	(New Zealand) Maximum Motorsport	Subaru Legacy RS	-

=== Itinerary ===
All dates and times are AWST (UTC+8)

Date	Time	No.	Stage name	Distance
9 Nov	18:42	SS1	Langley Park 1	2.20 km
10 Nov	10:26	SS2	Helena North 1	24.14 km
10 Nov	10:53	SS3	Helena South 1	18.43 km
10 Nov	11:58	SS4	New Kev's	9.56 km
10 Nov	12:36	SS5	New Beraking	26.46 km
10 Nov	13:24	SS6	Flynns Short	19.98 km
10 Nov	15:31	SS7	Helena North 2	24.14 km
10 Nov	15:58	SS8	Helena South 2	18.43 km
10 Nov	16:23	SS9	Atkins	4.42 km
10 Nov	19:30	SS10	Langley Park 2	2.20 km
Leg 1 total: 149.96 km
11 Nov	08:32	SS11	Sterling East	35.48 km
11 Nov	09:19	SS12	Brunswick	16.63 km
11 Nov	11:13	SS13	Wellington Dam	45.42 km
11 Nov	13:54	SS14	New Harvey Weir	7.04 km
11 Nov	14:14	SS15	Stirling West	15.89 km
11 Nov	15:56	SS16	Murray Pines	18.53 km
11 Nov	19:30	SS17	Langley Park	2.20 km
Leg 2 total: 141.19 km
12 Nov	07:32	SS18	Bannister West	35.29 km
12 Nov	08:52	SS19	Bannister North	36.84 km
12 Nov	10:42	SS20	Bannister South	25.16 km
12 Nov	12:34	SS21	Michelin TV Stage	2.73 km
Leg 1 total: 100.02 km
Rally total: 391.17 km

== Results ==
=== Overall ===
Pos.	No.	Driver	Co-driver	Team	Car	Time	Difference	Points
1	10	(Finland) Marcus Grönholm	(Finland) Timo Rautiainen	(France) Peugeot Esso	Peugeot 206 WRC	3:43:57.2	+-0:00	10
2	3	(United Kingdom) Richard Burns	(United Kingdom) Robert Reid	(Japan) Subaru World Rally Team	Subaru Impreza S6 WRC '00	3:43:59.9	+2.7	6
3	9	(France) François Delecour	(France) Daniel Grataloup	(France) Peugeot Esso	Peugeot 206 WRC	3:45:30.6	+1:33.4	4
4	14	(Sweden) Kenneth Eriksson	(Sweden) Staffan Parmander	(South Korea) Hyundai Castrol WRT	Hyundai Accent WRC	3:46:17.8	+2:20.6	3
5	8	(Finland) Toni Gardemeister	(Finland) Paavo Lukander	(Spain) SEAT Sport	SEAT Córdoba WRC Evo3	3:46:46.5	+2:49.3	2
6	7	(France) Didier Auriol	(France) Denis Giraudet	(Spain) SEAT Sport	SEAT Córdoba WRC Evo3	3:51:51.8	+7:54.6	1

=== World Rally Cars ===
==== Classification ====
Position		No.	Driver	Co-driver	Entrant	Car	Time	Difference	Points
Event	Class	No.	Driver	Co-driver	Entrant	Car	Time	Difference	Points
1	1	10	(Finland) Marcus Grönholm	(Finland) Timo Rautiainen	(France) Peugeot Esso	Peugeot 206 WRC	3:43:57.2	+-0:00	10
2	2	3	(United Kingdom) Richard Burns	(United Kingdom) Robert Reid	(Japan) Subaru World Rally Team	Subaru Impreza S6 WRC '00	3:43:59.9	+2.7	6
3	3	9	(France) François Delecour	(France) Daniel Grataloup	(France) Peugeot Esso	Peugeot 206 WRC	3:45:30.6	+1:33.4	4
4	4	14	(Sweden) Kenneth Eriksson	(Sweden) Staffan Parmander	(South Korea) Hyundai Castrol WRT	Hyundai Accent WRC	3:46:17.8	+2:20.6	3
6	5	8	(Finland) Toni Gardemeister	(Finland) Paavo Lukander	(Spain) SEAT Sport	SEAT Córdoba WRC Evo3	3:46:46.5	+2:49.3	2
8	6	7	(France) Didier Auriol	(France) Denis Giraudet	(Spain) SEAT Sport	SEAT Córdoba WRC Evo3	3:51:51.8	+7:54.6	1
Retired SS21		1	(Finland) Tommi Mäkinen	(Finland) Risto Mannisenmäki	(Japan) Marlboro Mitsubishi Ralliart	Mitsubishi Lancer Evo VI	Excluded - Turbo		0
Retired SS16		4	(Finland) Juha Kankkunen	(Finland) Juha Repo	(Japan) Subaru World Rally Team	Subaru Impreza S6 WRC '00	Accident		0
Retired SS15		15	(United Kingdom) Alister McRae	(United Kingdom) David Mills	(South Korea) Hyundai Castrol WRT	Hyundai Accent WRC	Suspension		0
Retired SS11		6	(Spain) Carlos Sainz	(Spain) Luis Moya	(United Kingdom) Ford Motor Co. Ltd.	Ford Focus RS WRC '00	Excluded - Stopped right before finish line		0
Retired SS7		5	(United Kingdom) Colin McRae	(United Kingdom) Nicky Grist	(United Kingdom) Ford Motor Co. Ltd.	Ford Focus RS WRC '00	Engine		0
Retired SS3		2	(Belgium) Freddy Loix	(Belgium) Sven Smeets	(Japan) Marlboro Mitsubishi Ralliart	Mitsubishi Carisma GT Evo VI	Transmission		0

==== Special stages ====
Day	Stage	Stage name	Length	Winner	Car	Time	Class leaders
9 Nov	SS1	Langley Park 1	2.20 km	(Finland) Marcus Grönholm	Peugeot 206 WRC	1:31.6	(Finland) Marcus Grönholm
10 Nov	SS2	Helena North 1	24.14 km	(Finland) Marcus Grönholm	Peugeot 206 WRC	13:55.8	(Finland) Marcus Grönholm
10 Nov	SS3	Helena South 1	18.43 km	(Finland) Juha Kankkunen	Subaru Impreza S6 WRC '00	9:50.0	(Finland) Marcus Grönholm
10 Nov	SS4	New Kev's	9.56 km	(Norway) Petter Solberg	Subaru Impreza S6 WRC '00	6:10.9	(Finland) Marcus Grönholm
10 Nov	SS5	New Beraking	26.46 km	(Finland) Tommi Mäkinen	Mitsubishi Lancer Evo VI	15:09.9	(Finland) Marcus Grönholm
10 Nov	SS6	Flynns Short	19.98 km	(Norway) Petter Solberg	Subaru Impreza S6 WRC '00	12:03.8	(Finland) Marcus Grönholm
10 Nov	SS7	Helena North 2	24.14 km	(France) François Delecour	Peugeot 206 WRC	13:39.0	(Finland) Marcus Grönholm
10 Nov	SS8	Helena South 2	18.43 km	(Finland) Tommi Mäkinen	Mitsubishi Lancer Evo VI	9:42.5	(Finland) Marcus Grönholm
10 Nov	SS9	Atkins	4.42 km	(Sweden) Kenneth Eriksson	Hyundai Accent WRC	3:00.3	(Finland) Juha Kankkunen
10 Nov	SS10	Langley Park 2	2.20 km	(Finland) Tommi Mäkinen	Mitsubishi Lancer Evo VI	1:31.8	(Finland) Juha Kankkunen
11 Nov	SS11	Sterling East	35.48 km	(United Kingdom) Richard Burns	Subaru Impreza S6 WRC '00	20:01.3	(United Kingdom) Richard Burns
11 Nov	SS12	Brunswick	16.63 km	(Finland) Tommi Mäkinen	Mitsubishi Lancer Evo VI	9:16.3	(United Kingdom) Richard Burns
11 Nov	SS13	Wellington Dam	45.42 km	(United Kingdom) Richard Burns	Subaru Impreza S6 WRC '00	25:37.7	(United Kingdom) Richard Burns
11 Nov	SS14	New Harvey Weir	7.04 km	(Finland) Marcus Grönholm	Peugeot 206 WRC	3:51.8	(United Kingdom) Richard Burns
11 Nov	SS15	Stirling West	15.89 km	(Finland) Marcus Grönholm	Peugeot 206 WRC	9:31.2	(United Kingdom) Richard Burns
11 Nov	SS16	Murray Pines	18.53 km	(Sweden) Kenneth Eriksson	Hyundai Accent WRC	11:10.8	(Finland) Tommi Mäkinen
11 Nov	SS17	Langley Park	2.20 km	(United Kingdom) Richard Burns	Subaru Impreza S6 WRC '00	1:33.7	(Finland) Marcus Grönholm
12 Nov	SS18	Bannister West	35.29 km	(Finland) Tommi Mäkinen	Mitsubishi Lancer Evo VI	17:33.0	(Finland) Tommi Mäkinen
12 Nov	SS19	Bannister North	36.84 km	(Finland) Tommi Mäkinen	Mitsubishi Lancer Evo VI	19:44.6	(Finland) Tommi Mäkinen
12 Nov	SS20	Bannister South	25.16 km	(Finland) Tommi Mäkinen	Mitsubishi Lancer Evo VI	15:04.3	(Finland) Tommi Mäkinen
12 Nov	SS21	Michelin TV Stage	2.73 km	(Finland) Marcus Grönholm	Peugeot 206 WRC	1:33.9	(Finland) Marcus Grönholm

==== Championship standings ====
Pos.	Drivers' championships			Co-drivers' championships			Manufacturers' championships		
Pos.	Move	Driver	Points	Move	Co-driver	Points	Move	Manufacturer	Points
1		(Finland) Marcus Grönholm	59		(Finland) Timo Rautiainen	59		(France) Peugeot Esso	104
2		(United Kingdom) Richard Burns	50		(United Kingdom) Robert Reid	50		(United Kingdom) Ford Motor Co. Ltd.	88
3		(United Kingdom) Colin McRae	43		(Spain) Luis Moya	43		(Japan) Subaru World Rally Team	76
4		(Spain) Carlos Sainz Sr.	43		(United Kingdom) Nicky Grist	43		(Japan) Marlboro Mitsubishi Ralliart	39
5		(Finland) Tommi Mäkinen	32		(Finland) Risto Mannisenmäki	32		(Spain) SEAT Sport	11

=== FIA Cup for Production Rally Cars ===
==== Classification ====
Position		No.	Driver	Co-driver	Entrant	Car	Time	Difference	Points
Event	Class	No.	Driver	Co-driver	Entrant	Car	Time	Difference	Points
12	1	30	(Uruguay) Gustavo Trelles	(Argentina) Jorge Del Buono	(Uruguay) Gustavo Trelles	Mitsubishi Lancer Evo VI	4:01:36.1	+-0:00	10
13	2	26	(Japan) Toshihiro Arai	(United Kingdom) Roger Freeman	(Japan) Spike Subaru Team	Subaru Impreza WRX	4:02:18.4	+42.3	6
14	3	28	(Austria) Manfred Stohl	(Austria) Peter Müller	(Austria) Manfred Stohl	Mitsubishi Lancer Evo VI	4:03:27.8	+1:51.7	4
15	4	29	(Australia) Ed Ordynski	(Australia) Iain Stewart	(Australia) Ed Ordynski	Mitsubishi Lancer Evo VI	4:04:15.8	+2:39.7	3
16	5	36	(Italy) Giovanni Manfrinato	(Italy) Claudio Condotta	(Italy) Giovanni Manfrinato	Mitsubishi Lancer Evo VI	4:05:06.1	+3:30.0	2
17	6	35	(Argentina) Claudio Marcelo Menzi	(Argentina) Edgardo Galindo	(Argentina) Claudio Marcelo Menzi	Mitsubishi Lancer Evo VI	4:05:59.5	+4:23.4	1
18	7	43	(Finland) Kaj Kuistila	(Finland) Kai Rantanen	(Finland) Kaj Kuistila	Mitsubishi Lancer Evo VI	4:06:41.1	+5:05.0	0
19	8	37	(Australia) Dean Herridge	(Australia) Glenn Macneall	(Australia) Maximum Motorsport	Subaru Impreza 555	4:06:45.0	+5:08.9	0
20	9	41	(Australia) Spencer Lowndes	(Australia) Chris Randell	(Australia) Spencer Lowndes	Mitsubishi Lancer Evo VI	4:07:05.4	+5:29.3	0
21	10	34	(Argentina) Gabriel Pozzo	(Argentina) Fabian Cretu	(Argentina) Gabriel Pozzo	Mitsubishi Lancer Evo VI	4:10:08.3	+8:32.2	0
22	11	49	(New Zealand) Alex Stone	(New Zealand) Diana Madlener	(New Zealand) Alex Stone	Subaru Impreza WRX	4:12:24.9	+10:48.8	0
24	12	38	(Italy) Nicola Caldani	(Italy) Claudio Condotta	(Italy) Nicola Caldani	Mitsubishi Lancer Evo IV	4:20:24.3	+18:48.233	0
25	13	54	(Belgium) Bob Colsoul	(Belgium) Tom Colsoul	(Belgium) Bob Colsoul	Mitsubishi Lancer Evo VI	4:28:12.1	+26:36.0	0
26	14	55	(New Zealand) Michael Thompson	(New Zealand) Gordon Klebba	(New Zealand) Michael Thompson	Subaru Impreza WRX	4:28:28.9	+26:52.8	0
27	15	53	(Japan) Haruo Takakuwa	(Japan) Hiroshi Suzuki	(Japan) Haruo Takakuwa	Subaru Impreza 555	4:29:03.8	+27:27.7	0
28	16	57	(Japan) Michiyasu Endo	(Japan) Hiroyasu Sonoda	(Japan) Takayama College	Subaru Impreza 555	4:31:27.8	+29:51.7	0
29	17	65	(New Zealand) Jim Marden	(New Zealand) Stuart Percival	(New Zealand) Jim Marden	Subaru Impreza 555	4:32:17.3	+30:41.2	0
31	18	73	(New Zealand) Jason Walk	(New Zealand) Julian Graziani	(New Zealand) Jason Walk	Subaru Impreza 555	4:37:04.2	+35:28.1	0
32	19	50	(New Zealand) David Hill	(New Zealand) Sophie Handley	(New Zealand) Australian Plastic Profiles	Mitsubishi Lancer Evo V	4:37:40.4	+36:04.3	0
34	20	71	(Japan) Wakujiro Kobayashi	(Japan) Keiji Seita	(Japan) Wakujiro Kobayashi	Mitsubishi Lancer Evo V	4:39:50.4	+38:14.3	0
35	21	69	(Japan) Ichiro Nakano	(New Zealand) Rex Johnstone	(Japan) Ichiro Nakano	Subaru Impreza WRX	4:40:22.3	+38:46.2	0
36	22	76	(Japan) Osamu Yoda	(New Zealand) Toni Feaver	(Japan) Osamu Yoda	Subaru Impreza WRX	4:43:36.1	+42:00.0	0
37	23	70	(New Zealand) Michael Anderson	(New Zealand) Melissa Anderson	(New Zealand) Michael Anderson	Mitsubishi Lancer Evo IV	4:43:42.0	+42:05.9	0
38	24	66	(Japan) Ryo Funaki	(Japan) Fumika Aoki	(Japan) Ryo Funaki	Subaru Impreza WRX	4:49:10.2	+47:34.1	0
39	25	74	(New Zealand) Leo Iriks	(New Zealand) Julie Iriks	(New Zealand) Leo Iriks	Mitsubishi Lancer Evo III	4:50:55.3	+49:19.2	0
40	26	60	(Japan) Toshimitsu Kuraoka	(New Zealand) Michael Hawiley	(New Zealand) Toshimitsu Kuraoka	Subaru Impreza 555	4:51:44.1	+50:08.0	0
41	27	77	(New Zealand) Bevan Phillips	(New Zealand) Reg Phillips	(New Zealand) Bevan Phillips	Hyundai Accent	4:55:58.3	+54:22.2	0
42	28	75	(New Zealand) Stuart Waters	(New Zealand) Gray Marshall	(New Zealand) Stuart Waters	Nissan Sunny GTI	4:57:41.6	+56:05.5	0
43	29	78	(New Zealand) John Hendry	(New Zealand) Andrew Wilson	(New Zealand) John Hendry	Proton Satria	5:02:35.7	+1:00:59.6	0
45	30	82	(New Zealand) Joseph Lombardo	(New Zealand) Nicole Paterson	(New Zealand) Joseph Lombardo	Proton Satria	5:11:13.4	+1:09:37.3	0
46	31	84	(New Zealand) Tod Reed	(New Zealand) Brian Reed	(New Zealand) Tod Reed	Proton Satria	5:19:59.9	+1:18:23.8	0
48	32	86	(New Zealand) John Rolfe	(New Zealand) Jeffrey Williams	(New Zealand) Office of Youth Affairs	Daihatsu Charade GTi	5:31:06.3	+1:29:30.2	0
49	33	96	(New Zealand) John Creach	(New Zealand) Jonathon Mortimer	(New Zealand) Maximum Motorsport	Subaru Legacy RS	6:22:36.1	+2:21:00.0	0
Retired SS16		48	(United Kingdom) Julian Reynolds	(United Kingdom) Andrew Bull	(United Kingdom) Julian Reynolds	Mitsubishi Lancer Evo V	Accident		0
Retired SS14		40	(France) Érik Comas	(France) Jean-Paul Terrasse	(France) Érik Comas	Mitsubishi Lancer Evo VI	Accident		0
Retired SS13		33	(Finland) Jani Paasonen	(Finland) Jakke Honkanen	(Finland) Jani Paasonen	Mitsubishi Carisma GT VI	Electrical		0
Retired SS11		80	(New Zealand) Karl Drummond	(New Zealand) Paul Bennett	(New Zealand) Karl Drummond	Suzuki Swift GTi	Mechanical		0
Retired SS6		45	(Japan) Osamu Yamaguchi	(Australia) Philip Dodd	(Japan) Osamu Yamaguchi	Mitsubishi Lancer Evo VI	Suspension		0
Retired SS6		56	(United Kingdom) Natalie Barratt	(United Kingdom) Paul Morris	(United Kingdom) Natalie Barratt	Subaru Impreza 555	Gearbox		0
Retired SS6		59	(New Zealand) Ben Grigsby	(New Zealand) Rick Grigsby	(New Zealand) Ben Grigsby	Subaru Impreza 555	Turbo		0
Retired SS3		31	(Finland) Juha Kangas	(Finland) Mika Ovaskainen	(Finland) Juha Kangas	Mitsubishi Lancer Evo VI	Clutch		0
Retired SS2		27	(Australia) Cody Crocker	(Australia) Greg Foletta	Subaru Rally Team Australia	Subaru Impreza WRX	Suspension		0
Retired SS2		46	(New Zealand) Reece Jones	(New Zealand) Leo Bult	(New Zealand) Reece Jones	Mitsubishi Lancer Evo VI	Accident		0
Retired SS2		81	(New Zealand) Dave King	(New Zealand) Mark Blume	(New Zealand) Dave King	Proton Satria	Accident		0
