= Harrie Vredenburg =

Business professor

- Years active: 1952–present

Harrie Vredenburg (born 1952) is a leading scholar in the areas of competitive strategy, innovation, sustainable development and corporate governance in global energy and natural resource industries and is Professor of Strategy and Suncor Chair in Strategy and Sustainability at the University of Calgary's Haskayne School of Business. He also holds appointments as a Research Fellow at the School of Public Policy at the University of Calgary and as an International Research Fellow at the Saïd Business School at the University of Oxford in the UK. In addition, he has taught annually at ESSAM, the European Summer School for Advanced Management since 2002.

Vredenburg was one of the visionaries who founded Haskayne's Global Energy Executive MBA and served as its Academic Director from its inception in 2010 to 2018. Students in this two year blended learning executive program live and work around the world and attend two-week intensive modules in Calgary, Houston, London, Beijing/Shanghai and Doha and between face-to-face modules do coursework online. He was also co-founder and Academic Director of the University of Calgary's MSc in Sustainable Energy Development from its inception in 1996 until 2006.

He has authored or co-authored more than 50 frequently cited articles in leading international scholarly publications including Strategic Management Journal, Organization Science, MIT Sloan Management Review, Harvard Business Review, Energy Policy, Energies, Technovation, International Journal of Economics & Business Research and Global Business & Economics Review. He has also coauthored government reports on industry regulation, innovation and competitiveness and on nuclear energy and he consults to industry. According to Google Scholar, his publications have been cited more than 5,000 times. A leading authority on corporate strategy, governance, innovation and the management of environmental issues in energy and resource industries, Vredenburg's work is recognized in academic circles, corporations, governments and non-profits.

A popular teacher, he lectures in MBA, Executive MBA, doctoral, executive development and corporate directors programs. He was honoured with the 2016-2017 Haskayne MBA Society Top MBA Teacher Award, based on a vote by MBA students. He was also voted 2015-2016 Haskayne MBA Society Top MBA Teacher.

He serves as a non-executive member of the boards of directors of several publicly traded and private international energy companies. He holds the ICD.D designation from the Institute of Corporate Directors as a certified corporate director.

He is married to Dr Jennifer Maguire. They have three adult children.

== Early life ==
Vredenburg was born in the Netherlands and moved to Canada as a youth when his father, an avionics technologist, took a position with American defense contractor Litton Systems in Toronto. He received a BA (Honours) in history from the University of Toronto in 1975 and an MBA in international business and finance, with Dean's list distinction (top 10% of graduating class), from McMaster University in 1979. After working in financial services marketing at American Express in Toronto, he completed a PhD in strategic management from the University of Western Ontario in 1986.

== Career ==
Before joining the University of Calgary in 1989, Vredenburg was a professor at McGill University (1984–1989). He was also a visiting professor at the University of British Columbia (1993–1994) and at the Rotterdam School of Management at Erasmus University (2003). He was founding director of the Haskayne School of Business' International Resource Industries and Sustainability Centre (now Energy and Environmental Initiatives), affiliated with the Institute for Sustainable Energy, Environment and Economy, from 1994 to 2007.
