= 2000 Rallye Catalunya =

5th round of the 2000 World Rally Championship

2000 Rally Catalunya 36th Rallye Catalunya - Costa Brava
Round 5 of the 2000 World Rally Championship season
← Previous event	Next event →
- Host country: Spain
- Rally base: Lloret de Mar
- Dates run: March 31, 2000 – April 2, 2000
- Stages: 15 (383.09 km; 238.04 miles)
- Stage surface: Asphalt
- Overall distance: 1,874.70 km (1,164.88 miles)

Statistics
- Crews: 91 at start, 55 at finish

Overall results
- Overall winner: (United Kingdom) Colin McRae (United Kingdom) Nicky Grist (United Kingdom) Ford Motor Co. Ltd. Ford Focus RS WRC '00

The 2000 Rally Catalunya (formally the 36th Rallye Catalunya - Costa Brava) was the fifth round of 2000 World Rally Championship. The race was held over four days between 16 March and 19 March 2000, and was won by Ford's Colin McRae.

== Background ==
=== Entry list ===
No.	Driver	Co-Driver	Entrant	Car	Tyre
World Rally Championship manufacturer entries
1	(Finland) Tommi Mäkinen	(Finland) Risto Mannisenmäki	(Japan) Marlboro Mitsubishi Ralliart	Mitsubishi Lancer Evo VI	M
2	(Belgium) Freddy Loix	(Belgium) Sven Smeets	(Japan) Marlboro Mitsubishi Ralliart	Mitsubishi Carisma GT Evo VI	M
3	(United Kingdom) Richard Burns	(United Kingdom) Robert Reid	(Japan) Subaru World Rally Team	Subaru Impreza S6 WRC '00	P
4	(Finland) Juha Kankkunen	(Finland) Juha Repo	(Japan) Subaru World Rally Team	Subaru Impreza S6 WRC '00	P
5	(United Kingdom) Colin McRae	(United Kingdom) Nicky Grist	(United Kingdom) Ford Motor Co. Ltd.	Ford Focus RS WRC '00	M
6	(Spain) Carlos Sainz	(Spain) Luis Moya	(United Kingdom) Ford Motor Co. Ltd.	Ford Focus RS WRC '00	M
7	(France) Didier Auriol	(France) Denis Giraudet	(Spain) SEAT Sport	SEAT Córdoba WRC Evo2	P
8	(Finland) Toni Gardemeister	(Finland) Paavo Lukander	(Spain) SEAT Sport	SEAT Córdoba WRC Evo2	P
9	(France) François Delecour	(France) Daniel Grataloup	(France) Peugeot Esso	Peugeot 206 WRC	M
10	(France) Gilles Panizzi	(France) Hervé Panizzi	(France) Peugeot Esso	Peugeot 206 WRC	M
11	(Germany) Armin Schwarz	(Germany) Manfred Hiemer	(Czech Republic) Škoda Motorsport	Škoda Octavia WRC	M
12	(Spain) Luis Climent Asensio	(Spain) Álex Romaní	(Czech Republic) Škoda Motorsport	Škoda Octavia WRC	M
14	(Sweden) Kenneth Eriksson	(Sweden) Staffan Parmander	(South Korea) Hyundai Castrol World Rally Team	Hyundai Accent WRC	M
15	(United Kingdom) Alister McRae	(United Kingdom) David Senior	(South Korea) Hyundai Castrol World Rally Team	Hyundai Accent WRC	M
World Rally Championship entries
16	(Finland) Marcus Grönholm	(Finland) Timo Rautiainen	(France) Peugeot Esso	Peugeot 206 WRC	M
18	(Denmark) Henrik Lundgaard	(Denmark) Jens-Christian Anker	(Denmark) Henrik Lundgaard	Toyota Corolla WRC	M
19	(Portugal) Adruzilo Lopes	(Portugal) Luís Lisboa	(Portugal) Peugeot Esso Silver Team SG	Peugeot 206 WRC	—N/a
20	(Italy) Andrea Navarra	(Italy) Simona Fedeli	(Italy) H.F. Grifone SRL	Toyota Corolla WRC	M
21	(Italy) Andrea Dallavilla	(Italy) Danilo Fappani	(Italy) Procar Rally Team	Subaru Impreza S5 WRC '99	P
22	(Spain) Salvador Cañellas Jr.	(Spain) Carlos del Barrio	(Spain) Salvador Cañellas Jr.	Seat Cordoba WRC Evo2	P
23	(Estonia) Markko Märtin	(United Kingdom) Michael Park	(Estonia) Lukoil EOS Rally Team	Toyota Corolla WRC	M
24	(Saudi Arabia) Abdullah Bakhashab	(United Kingdom) Bobby Willis	Toyota Team Saudi Arabia	Toyota Corolla WRC	M
25	(Japan) Toshihiro Arai	(United Kingdom) Roger Freeman	(Japan) Spike Subaru Team	Subaru Impreza S5 WRC '99	P
26	(Turkey) Serkan Yazici	(Turkey) Erkan Bodur	(Turkey) Team Atakan	Toyota Corolla WRC	—N/a
40	(France) Francis Mariani	(France) Dominique Savignoni	(France) Francis Mariani	Subaru Impreza S5 WRC '98	—N/a
41	(France) Fabrice Morel	(France) Philippe Guellerin	(France) Francis Mariani	Peugeot 206 WRC	M
Group N Cup entries
30	(Uruguay) Gustavo Trelles	(Argentina) Jorge Del Buono	(Uruguay) Gustavo Trelles	Mitsubishi Lancer Evo VI	P
31	(Austria) Manfred Stohl	(Austria) Peter Müller	(Austria) Manfred Stohl	Mitsubishi Lancer Evo VI	P
32	(Germany) Uwe Nittel	(Germany) Detlef Ruf	(Germany) Uwe Nittel	Mitsubishi Lancer Evo VI	P
33	(Argentina) Roberto Sanchez	(Argentina) Ruben Garcia	(Argentina) Roberto Sanchez	Subaru Impreza WRX	P
34	(Peru) Ramón Ferreyros	(Peru) Gonzalo Saenz	(Peru) Ramón Ferreyros	Mitsubishi Lancer Evo VI	—N/a
35	(Finland) Jani Paasonen	(Finland) Jakke Honkanen	Mitsubishi Ralliart Finland	Mitsubishi Carisma GT Evo VI	M
36	(Portugal) Miguel Campos	(Portugal) Carlos Magalhães	(Portugal) Mitsubishi Galp	Mitsubishi Carisma GT Evo VI	M
37	(Uruguay) Gabriel Mendez	(Uruguay) Daniel Muzio	(Uruguay) Gabriel Mendez	Mitsubishi Lancer Evo V	P
38	(Sweden) Pernilla Walfridsson-Solberg	(Sweden) Ulrika Mattsson	(Sweden) Pernilla Walfridsson-Solberg	Mitsubishi Lancer Evo VI	—N/a
43	(Spain) Manuel Muniente	(Spain) Diego Vallejo	(Spain) Manuel Muniente	Mitsubishi Lancer Evo VI	—N/a
44	(Spain) Oriol Gómez Marco	(Spain) Oriol Julià Pascual	(Spain) Oriol Gómez Marco	Mitsubishi Lancer Evo VI	—N/a
45	(Belgium) David Loix	(Belgium) Cédric Pirotte	(Belgium) David Loix	Mitsubishi Lancer Evo V	M
46	(Spain) Ignacio Sanfilippo	(Spain) José Vicente Medina	(Spain) Ignacio Sanfilippo	Mitsubishi Lancer Evo VI	—N/a
47	(France) François Couchet	(France) Nicolas Berthoud	(France) François Couchet	BMW 325i E36	—N/a
48	(United Kingdom) Mike Corns	(Venezuela) Ana Goñi	(United Kingdom) Mike Corns	Mitsubishi Lancer Evo IV	—N/a
49	(Spain) Joan Font	(Spain) Manel Muñoz	(Spain) Escudería Voltregá	Mitsubishi Carisma GT Evo VI	—N/a
50	(Norway) Martin Stenshorne	(Norway) Ola Fløene	(Norway) Martin Stenshorne	Subaru Impreza WRX	—N/a
61	(Russia) Stanislav Gryazin	(Russia) Dmitriy Eremeev	(Russia) Stanislav Gryazin	Mitsubishi Lancer Evo VI	—N/a
62	(Japan) Wakujiro Kobayashi	(Japan) Kohei Kusaka	(Japan) Wakujiro Kobayashi	Mitsubishi Lancer Evo V	—N/a
63	(Argentina) Gabriel Pozzo	(Argentina) Rodolfo Amelio Ortiz	(Argentina) Gabriel Pozzo	Mitsubishi Lancer Evo VI	—N/a
64	(Argentina) Claudio Marcelo Menzi	(Argentina) Edgardo Galindo	(Argentina) Claudio Marcelo Menzi	Mitsubishi Lancer Evo VI	—N/a
65	(United Kingdom) John Lloyd	(United Kingdom) Pauline Gullick	(United Kingdom) John Lloyd	Subaru Impreza WRX	—N/a
66	(Belgium) Bob Colsoul	(Belgium) Tom Colsoul	(Belgium) Bob Colsoul	Mitsubishi Lancer Evo IV	—N/a
67	(Germany) Peter Schumann	(Germany) Thomas Schünemann	(Germany) Peter Schumann	Mitsubishi Carisma GT Evo VI	—N/a
68	(Japan) Atsushi Furuno	(Japan) Takuya Sugimura	(Japan) Atsushi Furuno	Subaru Impreza WRX	—N/a
69	(Italy) Marta Candian	(Italy) Mara Biotti	(Italy) Marta Candian	Mitsubishi Lancer Evo V	—N/a
70	(United Kingdom) Natalie Barratt	(United Kingdom) Stella Boyles	(United Kingdom) Natalie Barratt	Mitsubishi Lancer Evo VI	—N/a
71	(Finland) Kaj Kuistila	(Finland) Mika Ovaskainen	(Finland) Kaj Kuistila	Mitsubishi Lancer Evo VI	—N/a
73	(Portugal) Carlos Marques	(Portugal) Luís Cavaleiro	(Portugal) Carlos Marques	Mitsubishi Lancer Evo III	—N/a
74	(Spain) Paco Francisco Roig	(Spain) Ignacio Paz	(Spain) Escudería Bengala	Mitsubishi Lancer Evo VI	—N/a
75	(Spain) Antonio Garrido	(Spain) Luis Fernández González	(Spain) Team Gran Hotel de Lugo	Mitsubishi Lancer Evo V	—N/a
79	(France) Francis Leymarie	(France) Patrick Vieux-Rochat	(France) Francis Leymarie	Peugeot 306 S16	—N/a
80	(France) Régis Triboulet	(France) James Boisset	(France) Régis Triboulet	Peugeot 306 S16	—N/a
81	(Italy) Fabio Frisiero	(Italy) Vittorio Caneva	(Italy) Fabio Frisiero	Renault Clio Williams	—N/a
82	(Spain) Amador Vidal	(Spain) Francisco Lema Vidal	(Spain) Escudería La Coruña	Peugeot 106 Rallye	—N/a
83	(Spain) Enrique García Ojeda	(Spain) Víctor Pérez Rodríguez	(Spain) JLM Team	Peugeot 106 Rallye	—N/a
84	(Spain) David Nafría	(Spain) Pere Requena Palomares	(Spain) JLM Team	Peugeot 106 Rallye	—N/a
85	(Spain) Eloy Entrecanales	(Spain) Jose Manuel Cobo	(Spain) JLM Team	Peugeot 106 Rallye	—N/a
86	(Spain) Sergio López-Fombona	(Spain) Raúl García	(Spain) A.C. Principado de Asturias	Peugeot 106 Rallye	—N/a
87	(Spain) Jaume Darné Escolà	(Spain) Jaume Darné V.	(Spain) Escudería Motor Terrassa	Peugeot 106 Rallye	—N/a
88	(Spain) Héctor Soler Libori	(Spain) Raúl Soler Libori	(Spain) Escudería Motor Terrassa	Peugeot 106 Rallye	—N/a
89	(Spain) Eduard García	(Spain) Santi Cobo	(Spain) Escudería Motor Terrassa	Peugeot 106 Rallye	—N/a
90	(Spain) Jordi Trius	(Spain) Josep Ángel Barros de Diego	(Spain) Escudería Motor Terrassa	Peugeot 106 Rallye	—N/a
91	(Spain) Josep Fornell Argany	(Spain) Xavier Avellan	(Spain) Gamace MC Competición	Peugeot 106 Rallye	—N/a
92	(France) Jean-Marc Poisson	(France) Olivier Lesigne	(France) Jean-Marc Poisson	Honda Civic VTi	—N/a
93	(Portugal) João Cambão	(Portugal) Duarte Costa	(Spain) Escudería La Coruña	Peugeot 106 Rallye	—N/a
94	(Germany) Florian Schmidt	(Germany) Andreas Schwalie	(Germany) Florian Schmidt	Peugeot 106 Rallye	—N/a
95	(United Kingdom) Brian Cameron	(United Kingdom) Jon Southall	(United Kingdom) Brian Cameron	Rover Mini Cooper	—N/a
96	(Portugal) António Pinto dos Santos	(Portugal) Nuno Rodrigues da Silva	(Portugal) António Pinto dos Santos	Renault 4 GTL	—N/a

=== Itinerary ===
All dates and times are CEST (UTC+2).

Date	Time	No.	Stage name	Distance
Leg 1 — 91.06 km
31 March	09:57	SS1	La Trona 1	12.88 km
31 March	10:32	SS2	Alpens — Les Llosses 1	21.99 km
31 March	11:30	SS3	Coll de Santigosa 1	10.66 km
31 March	14:03	SS4	La Trona 2	12.88 km
31 March	14:38	SS5	Alpens — Les Llosses 2	21.99 km
31 March	15:36	SS6	Coll de Santigosa 2	10.66 km
Leg 2 — 181.65 km
1 April	08:28	SS7	Gratallops — Escaladei 1	45.88 km
1 April	11:05	SS8	La Riba 1	36.16 km
1 April	14:03	SS9	Gratallops — Escaladei 2	45.88 km
1 April	16:54	SS10	Coll Roig	17.57 km
1 April	17:45	SS11	La Riba 2	36.16 km
Leg 3 — 110.38 km
2 April	08:18	SS12	St Julià — Arbúcies 1	36.85 km
2 April	10:11	SS13	Coll de Bracons 1	18.34 km
2 April	12:13	SS14	St Julià — Arbúcies 2	36.85 km
2 April	14:06	SS15	Coll de Bracons 2	18.34 km

== Results ==
=== Overall ===
Pos.	No.	Driver	Co-driver	Team	Car	Time	Difference	Points
1	5	(United Kingdom) Colin McRae	(United Kingdom) Nicky Grist	(United Kingdom) Ford Motor Co. Ltd.	Ford Focus RS WRC '00	4:07:13.0		10
2	3	(United Kingdom) Richard Burns	(United Kingdom) Robert Reid	(Japan) Subaru World Rally Team	Subaru Impreza S6 WRC '00	4:07:18.9	+5.9	6
3	6	(Spain) Carlos Sainz	(Spain) Luis Moya	(United Kingdom) Ford Motor Co. Ltd.	Ford Focus RS WRC '00	4:07:24.7	+11.7	4
4	1	(Finland) Tommi Mäkinen	(Finland) Risto Mannisenmäki	(Japan) Marlboro Mitsubishi Ralliart	Mitsubishi Lancer Evo VI	4:07:53.2	+40.2	3
5	16	(Finland) Marcus Grönholm	(Finland) Timo Rautiainen	(France) Peugeot Esso	Peugeot 206 WRC	4:09:04.7	+1:51.7	2
6	10	(France) Gilles Panizzi	(France) Hervé Panizzi	(France) Peugeot Esso	Peugeot 206 WRC	4:09:23.9	+2:10.9	1

=== World Rally Cars ===
==== Classification ====
Position		No.	Driver	Co-driver	Entrant	Car	Time	Difference	Points
Event	Class	No.	Driver	Co-driver	Entrant	Car	Time	Difference	Points
1	1	5	(United Kingdom) Colin McRae	(United Kingdom) Nicky Grist	(United Kingdom) Ford Motor Co. Ltd.	Ford Focus RS WRC '00	4:07:13.0		10
2	2	3	(United Kingdom) Richard Burns	(United Kingdom) Robert Reid	(Japan) Subaru World Rally Team	Subaru Impreza S6 WRC '00	4:07:18.9	+5.9	6
3	3	6	(Spain) Carlos Sainz	(Spain) Luis Moya	(United Kingdom) Ford Motor Co. Ltd.	Ford Focus RS WRC '00	4:07:24.7	+11.7	4
4	4	1	(Finland) Tommi Mäkinen	(Finland) Risto Mannisenmäki	(Japan) Marlboro Mitsubishi Ralliart	Mitsubishi Lancer Evo VI	4:07:53.2	+40.2	3
6	5	10	(France) Gilles Panizzi	(France) Hervé Panizzi	(France) Peugeot Esso	Peugeot 206 WRC	4:09:23.9	+2:10.9	1
7	6	9	(France) François Delecour	(France) Daniel Grataloup	(France) Peugeot Esso	Peugeot 206 WRC	4:10:49.4	+3:36.4	0
8	7	2	(Belgium) Freddy Loix	(Belgium) Sven Smeets	(Japan) Marlboro Mitsubishi Ralliart	Mitsubishi Carisma GT Evo VI	4:11:25.5	+4:12.5	0
11	8	11	(Germany) Armin Schwarz	(Germany) Manfred Hiemer	(Czech Republic) Škoda Motorsport	Škoda Octavia WRC	4:12:45.1	+5:32.1	0
13	9	7	(France) Didier Auriol	(France) Denis Giraudet	(Spain) SEAT Sport	SEAT Córdoba WRC Evo2	4:14:11.0	+6:58.0	0
23	10	14	(Sweden) Kenneth Eriksson	(Sweden) Staffan Parmander	(South Korea) Hyundai Castrol World Rally Team	Hyundai Accent WRC	4:32:51.6	+25:38.6	0
Retired SS14		12	(Spain) Luis Climent Asensio	(Spain) Álex Romaní	(Czech Republic) Škoda Motorsport	Škoda Octavia WRC	Accident		0
Retired SS12		4	(Finland) Juha Kankkunen	(Finland) Juha Repo	(Japan) Subaru World Rally Team	Subaru Impreza S6 WRC '00	Mechanical		0
Retired SS11		8	(Finland) Toni Gardemeister	(Finland) Paavo Lukander	(Spain) SEAT Sport	SEAT Córdoba WRC Evo2	Accident		0
Retired SS9		15	(United Kingdom) Alister McRae	(United Kingdom) David Senior	(South Korea) Hyundai Castrol World Rally Team	Hyundai Accent WRC	Engine		0

==== Special stages ====
Day	Stage	Stage name	Length	Winner	Car	Time	Class leaders
Leg 1 (31 Mar)	SS1	La Trona 1	12.88 km	(United Kingdom) Richard Burns	Subaru Impreza S6 WRC '00	9:07.3	(United Kingdom) Richard Burns
Leg 1 (31 Mar)	SS2	Alpens — Les Llosses 1	21.99 km	(United Kingdom) Richard Burns	Subaru Impreza S6 WRC '00	14:30.3	(United Kingdom) Richard Burns
Leg 1 (31 Mar)	SS3	Coll de Santigosa 1	10.66 km	(Spain) Carlos Sainz	Ford Focus RS WRC '00	7:07.6	(United Kingdom) Richard Burns
Leg 1 (31 Mar)	SS4	La Trona 2	12.88 km	(United Kingdom) Richard Burns	Subaru Impreza S6 WRC '00	9:31.5	(United Kingdom) Richard Burns
Leg 1 (31 Mar)	SS5	Alpens — Les Llosses 2	21.99 km	(Germany) Armin Schwarz	Škoda Octavia WRC	15:00.8	(United Kingdom) Richard Burns
Leg 1 (31 Mar)	SS6	Coll de Santigosa 2	10.66 km	(United Kingdom) Colin McRae	Ford Focus RS WRC '00	7:08.6	(United Kingdom) Richard Burns
Leg 2 (1 Apr)	SS7	Gratallops — Escaladei 1	45.88 km	(United Kingdom) Colin McRae	Ford Focus RS WRC '00	29:00.2	(United Kingdom) Colin McRae
Leg 2 (1 Apr)	SS8	La Riba 1	36.16 km	(Finland) Tommi Mäkinen	Mitsubishi Lancer Evo VI	22:36.4	(United Kingdom) Colin McRae
Leg 2 (1 Apr)	SS9	Gratallops — Escaladei 2	45.88 km	(United Kingdom) Colin McRae	Ford Focus RS WRC '00	29:04.1	(United Kingdom) Colin McRae
Leg 2 (1 Apr)	SS10	Coll Roig	17.57 km	(Spain) Carlos Sainz	Ford Focus RS WRC '00	10:41.3	(United Kingdom) Colin McRae
Leg 2 (1 Apr)	SS11	La Riba 2	36.16 km	(Spain) Carlos Sainz	Ford Focus RS WRC '00	22:41.0	(United Kingdom) Colin McRae
Leg 3 (2 Apr)	SS12	St Julià — Arbúcies 1	36.85 km	(United Kingdom) Colin McRae	Ford Focus RS WRC '00	22:46.0	(United Kingdom) Colin McRae
Leg 3 (2 Apr)	SS13	Coll de Bracons 1	18.34 km	(Finland) Tommi Mäkinen	Mitsubishi Lancer Evo VI	12:03.7	(United Kingdom) Colin McRae
Leg 3 (2 Apr)	SS14	St Julià — Arbúcies 2	36.85 km	(United Kingdom) Colin McRae	Ford Focus RS WRC '00	22:43.1	(United Kingdom) Colin McRae
Leg 3 (2 Apr)	SS15	Coll de Bracons 2	18.34 km	(Finland) Marcus Grönholm	Peugeot 206 WRC	12:09.3	(United Kingdom) Colin McRae

==== Championship standings ====
Pos.	Drivers' championships			Co-drivers' championships			Manufacturers' championships		
Pos.	Move	Driver	Points	Move	Co-driver	Points	Move	Manufacturer	Points
1		(United Kingdom) Richard Burns	28		(United Kingdom) Robert Reid	28		(Japan) Subaru World Rally Team	41
2		(Finland) Tommi Mäkinen	19		(Finland) Risto Mannisenmäki	19	2	(United Kingdom) Ford Motor Co. Ltd.	31
3		(Finland) Marcus Grönholm	18		(Finland) Timo Rautiainen	18		(Japan) Marlboro Mitsubishi Ralliart	23
4		(Spain) Carlos Sainz	17		(Spain) Luis Moya	17	2	(France) Peugeot Esso	23
5	2	(United Kingdom) Colin McRae	14	2	(United Kingdom) Nicky Grist	14		(Spain) SEAT Sport	7

=== FIA Cup for Production Rally Drivers ===
==== Classification ====
Position		No.	Driver	Co-driver	Entrant	Car	Time	Difference	Points
Event	Class	No.	Driver	Co-driver	Entrant	Car	Time	Difference	Points
17	1	32	(Germany) Uwe Nittel	(Germany) Detlef Ruf	(Germany) Uwe Nittel	Mitsubishi Lancer Evo VI	4:26:10.7		10
18	2	30	(Uruguay) Gustavo Trelles	(Argentina) Jorge Del Buono	(Uruguay) Gustavo Trelles	Mitsubishi Lancer Evo VI	4:27:33.7	+1:23.0	6
19	3	31	(Austria) Manfred Stohl	(Austria) Peter Müller	(Austria) Manfred Stohl	Mitsubishi Lancer Evo VI	4:30:39.4	+4:28.7	4
20	4	36	(Portugal) Miguel Campos	(Portugal) Carlos Magalhães	(Portugal) Mitsubishi Galp	Mitsubishi Carisma GT Evo VI	4:31:06.6	+4:55.9	3
21	5	64	(Argentina) Claudio Marcelo Menzi	(Argentina) Edgardo Galindo	(Argentina) Claudio Marcelo Menzi	Mitsubishi Lancer Evo VI	4:32:10.6	+5:59.9	2
22	6	35	(Finland) Jani Paasonen	(Finland) Jakke Honkanen	Mitsubishi Ralliart Finland	Mitsubishi Carisma GT Evo VI	4:32:20.9	+6:10.2	1
24	7	37	(Uruguay) Gabriel Mendez	(Uruguay) Daniel Muzio	(Uruguay) Gabriel Mendez	Mitsubishi Lancer Evo V	4:33:17.6	+7:06.9	0
25	8	50	(Norway) Martin Stenshorne	(Norway) Ola Fløene	(Norway) Martin Stenshorne	Subaru Impreza WRX	4:36:24.4	+10:13.7	0
26	9	33	(Argentina) Roberto Sanchez	(Argentina) Ruben Garcia	(Argentina) Roberto Sanchez	Subaru Impreza WRX	4:36:49.6	+10:38.9	0
28	10	63	(Argentina) Gabriel Pozzo	(Argentina) Rodolfo Amelio Ortiz	(Argentina) Gabriel Pozzo	Mitsubishi Lancer Evo VI	4:41:10.1	+14:59.4	0
29	11	45	(Belgium) David Loix	(Belgium) Cédric Pirotte	(Belgium) David Loix	Mitsubishi Lancer Evo V	4:41:13.5	+15:02.8	0
30	12	66	(Belgium) Bob Colsoul	(Belgium) Tom Colsoul	(Belgium) Bob Colsoul	Mitsubishi Lancer Evo IV	4:45:37.4	+19:26.7	0
31	13	49	(Spain) Joan Font	(Spain) Manel Muñoz	(Spain) Escudería Voltregá	Mitsubishi Carisma GT Evo VI	4:47:29.4	+21:18.7	0
32	14	69	(Italy) Marta Candian	(Italy) Mara Biotti	(Italy) Marta Candian	Mitsubishi Lancer Evo V	4:47:44.4	+21:33.7	0
34	15	83	(Spain) Enrique García Ojeda	(Spain) Víctor Pérez Rodríguez	(Spain) JLM Team	Peugeot 106 Rallye	4:48:15.2	+22:04.5	0
35	16	86	(Spain) Sergio López-Fombona	(Spain) Raúl García	(Spain) A.C. Principado de Asturias	Peugeot 106 Rallye	4:49:12.6	+23:01.9	0
36	17	82	(Spain) Amador Vidal	(Spain) Francisco Lema Vidal	(Spain) Escudería La Coruña	Peugeot 106 Rallye	4:50:13.9	+24:03.2	0
37	18	84	(Spain) David Nafría	(Spain) Pere Requena Palomares	(Spain) JLM Team	Peugeot 106 Rallye	4:50:30.0	+24:19.3	0
38	19	70	(United Kingdom) Natalie Barratt	(United Kingdom) Stella Boyles	(United Kingdom) Natalie Barratt	Mitsubishi Lancer Evo VI	4:52:49.2	+26:38.5	0
40	20	75	(Spain) Antonio Garrido	(Spain) Luis Fernández González	(Spain) Team Gran Hotel de Lugo	Mitsubishi Lancer Evo V	4:56:02.9	+29:52.2	0
41	21	48	(United Kingdom) Mike Corns	(Venezuela) Ana Goñi	(United Kingdom) Mike Corns	Mitsubishi Lancer Evo IV	5:01:09.5	+34:58.8	0
42	22	85	(Spain) Eloy Entrecanales	(Spain) Jose Manuel Cobo	(Spain) JLM Team	Peugeot 106 Rallye	5:03:21.4	+37:10.7	0
43	23	62	(Japan) Wakujiro Kobayashi	(Japan) Kohei Kusaka	(Japan) Wakujiro Kobayashi	Mitsubishi Lancer Evo V	5:04:34.3	+38:23.6	0
45	24	93	(Portugal) João Cambão	(Portugal) Duarte Costa	(Spain) Escudería La Coruña	Peugeot 106 Rallye	5:13:03.4	+46:52.7	0
46	25	67	(Germany) Peter Schumann	(Germany) Thomas Schünemann	(Germany) Peter Schumann	Mitsubishi Carisma GT Evo VI	5:14:33.8	+48:23.1	0
47	26	81	(Italy) Fabio Frisiero	(Italy) Vittorio Caneva	(Italy) Fabio Frisiero	Renault Clio Williams	5:19:14.9	+53:04.2	0
48	27	89	(Spain) Eduard García	(Spain) Santi Cobo	(Spain) Escudería Motor Terrassa	Peugeot 106 Rallye	5:19:24.7	+53:14.0	0
49	28	87	(Spain) Jaume Darné Escolà	(Spain) Jaume Darné V.	(Spain) Escudería Motor Terrassa	Peugeot 106 Rallye	5:29:54.1	+1:03:43.4	0
50	29	91	(Spain) Josep Fornell Argany	(Spain) Xavier Avellan	(Spain) Gamace MC Competición	Peugeot 106 Rallye	5:32:35.7	+1:06:25.0	0
51	30	95	(United Kingdom) Brian Cameron	(United Kingdom) Jon Southall	(United Kingdom) Brian Cameron	Rover Mini Cooper	5:33:17.5	+1:07:06.8	0
52	31	94	(Germany) Florian Schmidt	(Germany) Andreas Schwalie	(Germany) Florian Schmidt	Peugeot 106 Rallye	5:33:29.0	+1:07:18.3	0
53	32	92	(France) Jean-Marc Poisson	(France) Olivier Lesigne	(France) Jean-Marc Poisson	Honda Civic VTi	5:36:36.7	+1:10:26.0	0
55	33	96	(Portugal) António Pinto dos Santos	(Portugal) Nuno Rodrigues da Silva	(Portugal) António Pinto dos Santos	Renault 4 GTL	6:19:31.6	+1:53:20.9	0
Retired SS12		34	(Peru) Ramón Ferreyros	(Peru) Gonzalo Saenz	(Peru) Ramón Ferreyros	Mitsubishi Lancer Evo VI	Mechanical		0
Retired SS11		38	(Sweden) Pernilla Walfridsson-Solberg	(Sweden) Ulrika Mattsson	(Sweden) Pernilla Walfridsson-Solberg	Mitsubishi Lancer Evo VI	Mechanical		0
Retired SS11		74	(Spain) Paco Francisco Roig	(Spain) Ignacio Paz	(Spain) Escudería Bengala	Mitsubishi Lancer Evo VI	Mechanical		0
Retired SS9		44	(Spain) Oriol Gómez Marco	(Spain) Oriol Julià Pascual	(Spain) Oriol Gómez Marco	Mitsubishi Lancer Evo VI	Mechanical		0
Retired SS9		47	(France) François Couchet	(France) Nicolas Berthoud	(France) François Couchet	BMW 325i E36	Mechanical		0
Retired SS9		61	(Russia) Stanislav Gryazin	(Russia) Dmitriy Eremeev	(Russia) Stanislav Gryazin	Mitsubishi Lancer Evo VI	Accident		0
Retired SS9		73	(Portugal) Carlos Marques	(Portugal) Luís Cavaleiro	(Portugal) Carlos Marques	Mitsubishi Lancer Evo III	Mechanical		0
Retired SS9		79	(France) Francis Leymarie	(France) Patrick Vieux-Rochat	(France) Francis Leymarie	Peugeot 306 S16	Mechanical		0
Retired SS9		80	(France) Régis Triboulet	(France) James Boisset	(France) Régis Triboulet	Peugeot 306 S16	Mechanical		0
Retired SS7		46	(Spain) Ignacio Sanfilippo	(Spain) José Vicente Medina	(Spain) Ignacio Sanfilippo	Mitsubishi Lancer Evo VI	Accident		0
Retired SS6		68	(Japan) Atsushi Furuno	(Japan) Takuya Sugimura	(Japan) Atsushi Furuno	Subaru Impreza WRX	Mechanical		0
Retired SS6		90	(Spain) Jordi Trius	(Spain) Josep Ángel Barros de Diego	(Spain) Escudería Motor Terrassa	Peugeot 106 Rallye	Mechanical		0
Retired SS5		43	(Spain) Manuel Muniente	(Spain) Diego Vallejo	(Spain) Manuel Muniente	Mitsubishi Lancer Evo VI	Mechanical		0
Retired SS4		65	(United Kingdom) John Lloyd	(United Kingdom) Pauline Gullick	(United Kingdom) John Lloyd	Subaru Impreza WRX	Mechanical		0
Retired SS4		88	(Spain) Héctor Soler Libori	(Spain) Raúl Soler Libori	(Spain) Escudería Motor Terrassa	Peugeot 106 Rallye	Mechanical		0
Retired SS1		71	(Finland) Kaj Kuistila	(Finland) Mika Ovaskainen	(Finland) Kaj Kuistila	Mitsubishi Lancer Evo VI	Accident		0

==== Special stages ====
Day	Stage	Stage name	Length	Winner	Car	Time	Class leaders
Leg 1 (31 Mar)	SS1	La Trona 1	12.88 km	(Austria) Manfred Stohl	Mitsubishi Lancer Evo VI	9:50.9	(Austria) Manfred Stohl
Leg 1 (31 Mar)	SS2	Alpens — Les Llosses 1	21.99 km	(Germany) Uwe Nittel	Mitsubishi Lancer Evo VI	15:40.2	(Germany) Uwe Nittel
Leg 1 (31 Mar)	SS3	Coll de Santigosa 1	10.66 km	(Austria) Manfred Stohl	Mitsubishi Lancer Evo VI	7:39.2	(Austria) Manfred Stohl
Leg 1 (31 Mar)	SS4	La Trona 2	12.88 km	(Austria) Manfred Stohl	Mitsubishi Lancer Evo VI	10:20.4	(Austria) Manfred Stohl
Leg 1 (31 Mar)	SS5	Alpens — Les Llosses 2	21.99 km	(Germany) Uwe Nittel	Mitsubishi Lancer Evo VI	15:49.1	(Germany) Uwe Nittel
Leg 1 (31 Mar)	SS6	Coll de Santigosa 2	10.66 km	(Uruguay) Gustavo Trelles	Mitsubishi Lancer Evo VI	7:44.5	(Germany) Uwe Nittel
Leg 2 (1 Apr)	SS7	Gratallops — Escaladei 1	45.88 km	(Germany) Uwe Nittel	Mitsubishi Lancer Evo VI	31:12.7	(Germany) Uwe Nittel
Leg 2 (1 Apr)	SS8	La Riba 1	36.16 km	(Germany) Uwe Nittel	Mitsubishi Lancer Evo VI	24:16.2	(Germany) Uwe Nittel
Leg 2 (1 Apr)	SS9	Gratallops — Escaladei 2	45.88 km	(Uruguay) Gustavo Trelles	Mitsubishi Lancer Evo VI	31:14.5	(Germany) Uwe Nittel
Leg 2 (1 Apr)	SS10	Coll Roig	17.57 km	(Germany) Uwe Nittel	Mitsubishi Lancer Evo VI	11:25.9	(Germany) Uwe Nittel
Leg 2 (1 Apr)	SS11	La Riba 2	36.16 km	(Germany) Uwe Nittel	Mitsubishi Lancer Evo VI	24:18.1	(Germany) Uwe Nittel
Leg 3 (2 Apr)	SS12	St Julià — Arbúcies 1	36.85 km	(Germany) Uwe Nittel	Mitsubishi Lancer Evo VI	24:53.2	(Germany) Uwe Nittel
Leg 3 (2 Apr)	SS13	Coll de Bracons 1	18.34 km	(Uruguay) Gustavo Trelles	Mitsubishi Lancer Evo VI	13:05.9	(Germany) Uwe Nittel
Leg 3 (2 Apr)	SS14	St Julià — Arbúcies 2	36.85 km	(Germany) Uwe Nittel	Mitsubishi Lancer Evo VI	24:39.5	(Germany) Uwe Nittel
Leg 3 (2 Apr)	SS15	Coll de Bracons 2	18.34 km	(Uruguay) Gustavo Trelles	Mitsubishi Lancer Evo VI	13:09.3	(Germany) Uwe Nittel

==== Championship standings ====
Pos.	Drivers' championships		
Pos.	Move	Driver	Points
1		(Austria) Manfred Stohl	27
2	2	(Portugal) Miguel Campos	13
3		(Argentina) Claudio Marcelo Menzi	12
4	1	(Uruguay) Gustavo Trelles	12
5	3	(Finland) Jani Paasonen	11
