= Old Harry =

Old Harry may refer to:

== Film ==
- Old Harry, a character in 1936 British comedy On Top of the World
- Old Harry, a character in 1984 Australian film Street Hero
- Old Harry (film), a 2009 film starring Robert Hardy, and the eponymous main character

== Other uses ==
- Old Harry, a hamlet in Grosse-Île, Quebec, Canada
- Old Harry, pen name for Australian journalist Carl Feilberg (1844–1887)
- Old Harry oil field, in the Gulf of St. Lawrence, Newfoundland, Canada
- Old Harry Rocks, chalk formation at Handfast Point, Dorset, England
