= Harrie Cross =

Australian rules footballer

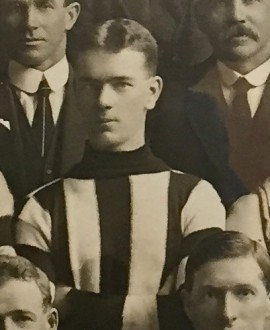
- Cross in 1917

Personal information
- Full name: Harrie Cross
- Born: 26 February 1893; Collingwood, Victoria
- Died: 18 March 1958 (aged 65); Mornington, Victoria
- Original team: Collingwood District
- Height: 173 cm (5 ft 8 in)
- Weight: 71 kg (157 lb)

Playing career^{1}
| Years | Club | Games (Goals) |
| 1917 | Collingwood | 1 (1) |
- ^{1} Playing statistics correct to the end of 1917.

Harrie Cross (26 February 1893 – 18 March 1958) was a former Australian rules footballer who played with Collingwood in the Victorian Football League (VFL).
