= Robert Harry (MP for Seaford) =

English politician

Robert Harry (fl. 1397–1399) of Seaford, Sussex, was an English politician.

He was a member (MP) of the parliament of England for Seaford in January 1397 and 1399.
