= 2001 Swedish Rally =

2nd round of the 2001 World Rally Championship

2001 Swedish Rally 50th International Swedish Rally
Round 2 of the 2001 World Rally Championship season
← Previous event	Next event →
- Host country: Sweden
- Rally base: Karlstad
- Dates run: February 9, 2001 – February 11, 2001
- Stages: 17 (379.87 km; 236.04 miles)
- Stage surface: Snow/ice
- Overall distance: 1,932.46 km (1,200.77 miles)

Statistics
- Crews: 75 at start, 41 at finish

Overall results
- Overall winner: (Finland) Harri Rovanperä (Finland) Risto Pietiläinen (France) Peugeot Total; Peugeot 206 WRC

The 2001 Swedish Rally (formally the 50th International Swedish Rally) was the second round of the 2001 World Rally Championship. The race was held over three days between 9 February and 11 February 2001, and was won by Peugeot's Harri Rovanperä, his first and only win in the World Rally Championship.

== Background ==
=== Entry list ===
No.	Driver	Co-Driver	Entrant	Car	Tyre
World Rally Championship manufacturer entries
1	(Finland) Marcus Grönholm	(Finland) Timo Rautiainen	(France) Peugeot Total	Peugeot 206 WRC	M
2	(France) Didier Auriol	(France) Denis Giraudet	(France) Peugeot Total	Peugeot 206 WRC	M
3	(Spain) Carlos Sainz	(Spain) Luis Moya	(United Kingdom) Ford Motor Co. Ltd.	Ford Focus RS WRC '01	P
4	(United Kingdom) Colin McRae	(United Kingdom) Nicky Grist	(United Kingdom) Ford Motor Co. Ltd.	Ford Focus RS WRC '01	P
5	(United Kingdom) Richard Burns	(United Kingdom) Robert Reid	(Japan) Subaru World Rally Team	Subaru Impreza S7 WRC '01	P
6	(Norway) Petter Solberg	(United Kingdom) Phil Mills	(Japan) Subaru World Rally Team	Subaru Impreza S7 WRC '01	P
7	(Finland) Tommi Mäkinen	(Finland) Risto Mannisenmäki	(Japan) Marlboro Mitsubishi Ralliart	Mitsubishi Lancer Evo 6.5	M
9	(Sweden) Kenneth Eriksson	(Sweden) Staffan Parmander	(South Korea) Hyundai Castrol World Rally Team	Hyundai Accent WRC	M
10	(United Kingdom) Alister McRae	(United Kingdom) David Senior	(South Korea) Hyundai Castrol World Rally Team	Hyundai Accent WRC	M
11	(Germany) Armin Schwarz	(Germany) Manfred Hiemer	(Czech Republic) Škoda Motorsport	Škoda Octavia WRC Evo2	M
12	(Belgium) Bruno Thiry	(Belgium) Stéphane Prévot	(Czech Republic) Škoda Motorsport	Škoda Octavia WRC Evo2	M
19	(Sweden) Thomas Rådström	(Sweden) Tina Thörner	(Japan) Marlboro Mitsubishi Ralliart	Mitsubishi Carisma GT Evo VI	M
World Rally Championship entries
8	(Belgium) Freddy Loix	(Belgium) Sven Smeets	(Japan) Marlboro Mitsubishi Ralliart	Mitsubishi Carisma GT Evo VI	M
16	(Finland) Harri Rovanperä	(Finland) Risto Pietiläinen	(France) Peugeot Total	Peugeot 206 WRC	M
17	(France) François Delecour	(France) Daniel Grataloup	(United Kingdom) Ford Motor Co. Ltd.	Ford Focus RS WRC '01	P
18	(Estonia) Markko Märtin	(United Kingdom) Michael Park	(Japan) Subaru World Rally Team	Subaru Impreza S7 WRC '01	P
20	(Norway) Henning Solberg	(Norway) Ola Fløene	(Norway) Henning Solberg	Toyota Corolla WRC	M
21	(Finland) Tapio Laukkanen	(Finland) Kaj Lindström	(Finland) Tapio Laukkanen	Toyota Corolla WRC	M
22	(Finland) Pasi Hagström	(Finland) Tero Gardemeister	Toyota Castrol Finland	Toyota Corolla WRC	M
23	(Finland) Toni Gardemeister	(Finland) Paavo Lukander	(Finland) Toni Gardemeister	Peugeot 206 WRC	M
24	(Finland) Janne Tuohino	(Finland) Petri Vihavainen	(Finland) Janne Tuohino	Toyota Corolla WRC	M
25	(Finland) Jani Paasonen	(Finland) Arto Kapanen	(Finland) Jani Paasonen	Ford Focus RS WRC '01	P
26	(Denmark) Henrik Lundgaard	(Denmark) Jens-Christian Anker	Toyota Castrol Team Denmark	Toyota Corolla WRC	M
33	(Poland) Janusz Kulig	(Poland) Jarosław Baran	(Poland) Marlboro Ford Mobil 1 Team	Ford Focus RS WRC '00	M
34	(Greece) Ioannis Papadimitriou	(United Kingdom) Chris Patterson	(Greece) Papadimitriou Team	Peugeot 206 WRC	—N/a
35	(Saudi Arabia) Abdullah Bakhashab	(United Kingdom) Bobby Willis	Marlboro Rally Team Saudi Arabia	Toyota Corolla WRC	M
36	(Czech Republic) Tomáš Hrdinka	(Czech Republic) Petr Gross	(Slovakia) Styllex Tuning Prosport	Subaru Impreza S5 WRC '98	M
38	(Oman) Hamed Al-Wahaibi	(New Zealand) Tony Sircombe	Oman Arab World Rally Team	Subaru Impreza S6 WRC '00	M
39	(France) Frédéric Dor	(France) Didier Breton	(France) F. Dor Rally Team	Subaru Impreza S6 WRC '00	—N/a
42	(United Kingdom) Nigel Heath	(United Kingdom) Steve Lancaster	(United Kingdom) World Rally HIRE	Subaru Impreza S5 WRC '99	—N/a
43	(Norway) Thomas Kolberg	(Norway) Werner Seigerud	(Norway) Thomas Kolberg	Hyundai Accent WRC	—N/a
44	(Sweden) Daniel Carlsson	(Sweden) Benny Melander	(Sweden) Daniel Carlsson	Toyota Corolla WRC	M
45	(Norway) Kristian Kolberg	(Sweden) Anders Dawidson	(Norway) Kristian Kolberg	Hyundai Accent WRC2	—N/a
59	(Sweden) Lasse Söderström	(Sweden) Mikael Johansson	(Sweden) Lasse Söderström	Toyota Celica GT-Four	—N/a
60	(Sweden) Torbjörn Pahlin	(Sweden) Jörgen Wiklander	(Sweden) Torbjörn Pahlin	Mitsubishi Lancer Evo III	—N/a
61	(Sweden) Anders Grundström	(Sweden) Bengt Viklund	(Sweden) Anders Grundström	Mitsubishi Lancer Evo V	—N/a
62	(Austria) Karl Rumpler	(Austria) Peter Stark	(Austria) Karl Rumpler	Subaru Impreza 555	—N/a
Group N Cup entries
27	(Sweden) Kenneth Bäcklund	(Sweden) Tord Andersson	(Sweden) Kenneth Bäcklund	Mitsubishi Lancer Evo VI	—N/a
28	(Sweden) Stig-Olov Walfridsson	(Sweden) Lars Bäckman	(Sweden) Stig-Olov Walfridsson	Mitsubishi Lancer Evo VI	—N/a
29	(Sweden) Mats Jonsson	(Sweden) Johnny Johansson	(Sweden) Mats Jonsson	Mitsubishi Lancer Evo VI	—N/a
40	(Sweden) Stig Blomqvist	(Venezuela) Ana Goñi	(United Kingdom) David Sutton Cars Ltd	Mitsubishi Lancer Evo VI	—N/a
41	(United Kingdom) Natalie Barratt	(United Kingdom) Trevor Agnew	(United Kingdom) Natalie Barratt Rallysport	Mitsubishi Lancer Evo V	—N/a
50	(Finland) Kristian Sohlberg	(Finland) Jukka Aho	(Finland) Kristian Sohlberg	Mitsubishi Carisma GT	—N/a
51	(Russia) Stanislav Gryazin	(Russia) Dmitriy Eremeev	(Russia) Stanislav Gryazin	Mitsubishi Lancer Evo VI	—N/a
52	(Belgium) Bob Colsoul	(Belgium) Tom Colsoul	(Belgium) Bob Colsoul	Mitsubishi Lancer Evo V	—N/a
53	(Lithuania) Saulius Girdauskas	(Lithuania) Žilvinas Sakalauskas	(Lithuania) Saulius Girdauskas	Mitsubishi Lancer Evo IV	—N/a
54	(Sweden) Oscar Svedlund	(Sweden) Björn Nilsson	(Sweden) Oscar Svedlund	Mitsubishi Lancer Evo V	—N/a
55	(Norway) Bernhard Kongsrud	(Norway) Geir Kirkhorn	(Norway) Bernhard Kongsrud	Mitsubishi Lancer Evo VI	—N/a
56	(Italy) Norberto Cangani	(Italy) Eros di Prima	(Italy) Norberto Cangani	Mitsubishi Lancer Evo VI	—N/a
57	(Sweden) Magnus Jansson	(Sweden) Thomas Fredriksson	(Sweden) Magnus Jansson	Mitsubishi Lancer Evo IV	—N/a
66	(Sweden) Matti Johansson	(Sweden) Ronny Johansson	(Sweden) Matti Johansson	Peugeot 306 S16	—N/a
67	(Sweden) Patric Carlsson	(Sweden) Bo Fransson	(Sweden) Patric Carlsson	Peugeot 306 S16	—N/a
68	(Sweden) Peter Hillebjörk	(Sweden) Roger Hillebjörk	(Sweden) Peter Hillebjörk	Renault Clio Sport	—N/a
69	(Sweden) Anders Wänn	(Sweden) Mikael Eriksson	(Sweden) Peter Hillebjörk	Renault Clio Sport	—N/a
70	(Sweden) Patrik Malteskog	(Sweden) Mathias Gårdman	(Sweden) Patrik Malteskog	Mitsubishi Lancer Evo IV	—N/a
71	(Sweden) Joakim Roman	(Sweden) Ingrid Mitakidou	(Sweden) Joakim Roman	Mitsubishi Lancer Evo V	—N/a
72	(United Kingdom) Nik Elsmore	(United Kingdom) Jayson Brown	(United Kingdom) Nik Elsmore	Mitsubishi Lancer Evo VI	—N/a
73	(Sweden) Pelle Palmqvist	(Sweden) Håkan Jacobsson	(Sweden) Pelle Palmqvist	Mitsubishi Lancer Evo V	—N/a
74	(Norway) Einar Staff Jr.	(Norway) Thorleif Halden	(Norway) Einar Staff Jr.	Subaru Impreza WRX	—N/a
75	(United Kingdom) Ben Briant	(United Kingdom) Konnie Huq	(United Kingdom) Ben Briant	Mitsubishi Lancer Evo VI	—N/a
80	(Norway) Tommy Slåstad	(Norway) Rune Haraldsen	(Norway) Tommy Slåstad	Opel Astra OPC	—N/a
81	(Sweden) Anders Knutsson	(Sweden) Ulf Gardelin	(Sweden) Anders Knutsson	Peugeot 306 S16	—N/a
82	(Germany) Andreas Mansfeld	(Germany) Klaus Hartmann	(Germany) Andreas Mansfeld	Honda Integra Type-R DC2	—N/a
83	(Sweden) Lasse Storm	(Sweden) Ulf Storm	(Sweden) Lasse Storm	Citroën AX GTI	—N/a
84	(Sweden) Johnny Andersson	(Sweden) Robert Ardryd	(Sweden) Johnny Andersson	Suzuki Swift GTi	—N/a
85	(Sweden) Lars-Erik Kronberg	(Sweden) Thomas Nilsson	(Sweden) Lars-Erik Kronberg	Suzuki Swift GTi	—N/a

=== Itinerary ===
All dates and times are CET (UTC+1).

Date	Time	No.	Stage name	Distance
Leg 1 — 148.51 km
9 February	09:11	SS1	Bjälverud	20.73 km
9 February	09:39	SS2	Lönnhöjden	18.81 km
9 February	10:30	SS3	Bogen	12.77 km
9 February	13:10	SS4	Granberget	49.36 km
9 February	15:44	SS5	Torntorp	20.37 km
9 February	16:28	SS6	Sagfallet	26.47 km
Leg 2 — 134.28 km
10 February	10:04	SS7	Kullen	26.80 km
10 February	10:45	SS8	Nyhammar 1	27.79 km
10 February	13:28	SS9	Fredriksberg	34.60 km
10 February	14:18	SS10	Silkesborg	15.30 km
10 February	15:49	SS11	Nyhammar 2	27.79 km
10 February	17:18	SS12	Lugnet	2.00 km
Leg 3 — 97.52 km
11 February	08:46	SS13	Sågen 1	14.76 km
11 February	09:39	SS14	Rämmen 1	23.40 km
11 February	11:31	SS15	Sågen 2	14.76 km
11 February	12:24	SS16	Rämmen 2	23.40 km
11 February	14:05	SS17	Hagfors	21.20 km

== Results ==
=== Overall ===
Pos.	No.	Driver	Co-driver	Team	Car	Time	Difference	Points
1	16	(Finland) Harri Rovanperä	(Finland) Risto Pietiläinen	(France) Peugeot Total	Peugeot 206 WRC	3:27:01.1		10
2	19	(Sweden) Thomas Rådström	(Sweden) Tina Thörner	(Japan) Marlboro Mitsubishi Ralliart	Mitsubishi Carisma GT Evo VI	3:27:29.0	+27.9	6
3	3	(Spain) Carlos Sainz	(Spain) Luis Moya	(United Kingdom) Ford Motor Co. Ltd.	Ford Focus RS WRC '01	3:27:38.1	+37.0	4
4	23	(Finland) Toni Gardemeister	(Finland) Paavo Lukander	(Finland) Toni Gardemeister	Peugeot 206 WRC	3:29:06.4	+2:05.3	3
5	17	(France) François Delecour	(France) Daniel Grataloup	(United Kingdom) Ford Motor Co. Ltd.	Ford Focus RS WRC '01	3:29:26.3	+2:25.2	2
6	6	(Norway) Petter Solberg	(United Kingdom) Phil Mills	(Japan) Subaru World Rally Team	Subaru Impreza S7 WRC '01	3:29:49.6	+2:48.5	1

=== World Rally Cars ===
==== Classification ====
Position		No.	Driver	Co-driver	Entrant	Car	Time	Difference	Points
Event	Class	No.	Driver	Co-driver	Entrant	Car	Time	Difference	Points
2	1	19	(Sweden) Thomas Rådström	(Sweden) Tina Thörner	(Japan) Marlboro Mitsubishi Ralliart	Mitsubishi Carisma GT Evo VI	3:27:29.0		6
3	2	3	(Spain) Carlos Sainz	(Spain) Luis Moya	(United Kingdom) Ford Motor Co. Ltd.	Ford Focus RS WRC '01	3:27:38.1	+9.1	4
6	3	6	(Norway) Petter Solberg	(United Kingdom) Phil Mills	(Japan) Subaru World Rally Team	Subaru Impreza S7 WRC '01	3:29:49.6	+2:20.6	1
8	4	9	(Sweden) Kenneth Eriksson	(Sweden) Staffan Parmander	(South Korea) Hyundai Castrol World Rally Team	Hyundai Accent WRC	3:30:36.9	+3:07.9	0
9	5	4	(United Kingdom) Colin McRae	(United Kingdom) Nicky Grist	(United Kingdom) Ford Motor Co. Ltd.	Ford Focus RS WRC '01	3:31:29.9	+4:00.9	0
10	6	12	(Belgium) Bruno Thiry	(Belgium) Stéphane Prévot	(Czech Republic) Škoda Motorsport	Škoda Octavia WRC Evo2	3:32:24.7	+4:55.7	0
16	7	5	(United Kingdom) Richard Burns	(United Kingdom) Robert Reid	(Japan) Subaru World Rally Team	Subaru Impreza S7 WRC '01	3:37:59.9	+10:30.9	0
Retired SS17		7	(Finland) Tommi Mäkinen	(Finland) Risto Mannisenmäki	(Japan) Marlboro Mitsubishi Ralliart	Mitsubishi Lancer Evo 6.5	Accident		0
Retired SS15		2	(France) Didier Auriol	(France) Denis Giraudet	(France) Peugeot Total	Peugeot 206 WRC	Transmission		0
Retired SS8		11	(Germany) Armin Schwarz	(Germany) Manfred Hiemer	(Czech Republic) Škoda Motorsport	Škoda Octavia WRC Evo2	Accident		0
Retired SS7		10	(United Kingdom) Alister McRae	(United Kingdom) David Senior	(South Korea) Hyundai Castrol World Rally Team	Hyundai Accent WRC	Engine		0
Retired SS3		1	(Finland) Marcus Grönholm	(Finland) Timo Rautiainen	(France) Peugeot Total	Peugeot 206 WRC	Engine		0

==== Special stages ====
Day	Stage	Stage name	Length	Winner	Car	Time	Class leaders
Leg 1 (9 Feb)	SS1	Bjälverud	20.73 km	(Finland) Marcus Grönholm	Peugeot 206 WRC	11:05.3	(Finland) Marcus Grönholm
Leg 1 (9 Feb)	SS2	Lönnhöjden	18.81 km	(Finland) Harri Rovanperä	Peugeot 206 WRC	10:41.5	(Finland) Harri Rovanperä
Leg 1 (9 Feb)	SS3	Bogen	12.77 km	(United Kingdom) Richard Burns	Subaru Impreza S7 WRC '01	7:31.7	(Sweden) Thomas Rådström
Leg 1 (9 Feb)	SS4	Granberget	49.36 km	(United Kingdom) Colin McRae	Ford Focus RS WRC '01	24:55.6	(Sweden) Thomas Rådström
Leg 1 (9 Feb)	SS5	Torntorp	20.37 km	(United Kingdom) Colin McRae	Ford Focus RS WRC '01	10:30.0	(Spain) Carlos Sainz
Leg 1 (9 Feb)	SS6	Sagfallet	26.47 km	(United Kingdom) Colin McRae	Ford Focus RS WRC '01	13:22.3	(Spain) Carlos Sainz
Leg 2 (10 Feb)	SS7	Kullen	26.80 km	(United Kingdom) Colin McRae	Ford Focus RS WRC '01	14:08.9	(Spain) Carlos Sainz
Leg 2 (10 Feb)	SS8	Nyhammar 1	27.79 km	(United Kingdom) Colin McRae	Ford Focus RS WRC '01	14:43.4	(Spain) Carlos Sainz
Leg 2 (10 Feb)	SS9	Fredriksberg	34.60 km	(United Kingdom) Colin McRae	Ford Focus RS WRC '01	19:21.7	(Finland) Harri Rovanperä
Leg 2 (10 Feb)	SS10	Silkesborg	15.30 km	(United Kingdom) Colin McRae	Ford Focus RS WRC '01	7:52.6	(Finland) Harri Rovanperä
Leg 2 (10 Feb)	SS11	Nyhammar 2	27.79 km	(Finland) Tommi Mäkinen	Mitsubishi Lancer Evo 6.5	14:50.2	(Finland) Harri Rovanperä
Leg 2 (10 Feb)	SS12	Lugnet	2.00 km	(Finland) Harri Rovanperä	Peugeot 206 WRC	2:00.0	(Finland) Harri Rovanperä
Leg 3 (11 Feb)	SS13	Sågen 1	14.76 km	(United Kingdom) Richard Burns	Subaru Impreza S7 WRC '01	7:55.4	(Finland) Harri Rovanperä
Leg 3 (11 Feb)	SS14	Rämmen 1	23.40 km	(United Kingdom) Richard Burns	Subaru Impreza S7 WRC '01	12:11.8	(Finland) Harri Rovanperä
Leg 3 (11 Feb)	SS15	Sågen 2	14.76 km	(United Kingdom) Richard Burns	Subaru Impreza S7 WRC '01	7:54.6	(Finland) Harri Rovanperä
Leg 3 (11 Feb)	SS16	Rämmen 2	23.40 km	(United Kingdom) Richard Burns	Subaru Impreza S7 WRC '01	12:16.2	(Finland) Harri Rovanperä
Leg 3 (11 Feb)	SS17	Hagfors	21.20 km	(United Kingdom) Richard Burns	Subaru Impreza S7 WRC '01	12:26.8	(Finland) Harri Rovanperä

==== Championship standings ====
Pos.	Drivers' championships			Co-drivers' championships			Manufacturers' championships		
Pos.	Move	Driver	Points	Move	Co-driver	Points	Move	Manufacturer	Points
1		(Finland) Tommi Mäkinen	10		(Finland) Risto Mannisenmäki	10		(Japan) Marlboro Mitsubishi Ralliart	23
2	New entry	(Finland) Harri Rovanperä	10	New entry	(Finland) Risto Pietiläinen	10		(United Kingdom) Ford Motor Co. Ltd.	14
3	1	(Spain) Carlos Sainz	10	1	(Spain) Luis Moya	10		(Czech Republic) Škoda Motorsport	6
4	New entry	(Sweden) Thomas Rådström	6	New entry	(Sweden) Tina Thörner	6		(South Korea) Hyundai Castrol World Rally Team	5
5	2	(France) François Delecour	6	2	(France) Daniel Grataloup	6	New entry	(Japan) Subaru World Rally Team	4

=== FIA Cup for Production Rally Drivers ===
==== Classification ====
Position		No.	Driver	Co-driver	Entrant	Car	Time	Difference	Points
Event	Class	No.	Driver	Co-driver	Entrant	Car	Time	Difference	Points
14	1	28	(Sweden) Stig-Olov Walfridsson	(Sweden) Lars Bäckman	(Sweden) Stig-Olov Walfridsson	Mitsubishi Lancer Evo VI	3:37:38.3		10
17	2	27	(Sweden) Kenneth Bäcklund	(Sweden) Tord Andersson	(Sweden) Kenneth Bäcklund	Mitsubishi Lancer Evo VI	3:39:27.7	+1:49.4	6
18	3	40	(Sweden) Stig Blomqvist	(Venezuela) Ana Goñi	(United Kingdom) David Sutton Cars Ltd	Mitsubishi Lancer Evo VI	3:43:58.0	+6:19.7	4
20	4	29	(Sweden) Mats Jonsson	(Sweden) Johnny Johansson	(Sweden) Mats Jonsson	Mitsubishi Lancer Evo VI	3:46:07.9	+8:29.6	3
23	5	53	(Lithuania) Saulius Girdauskas	(Lithuania) Žilvinas Sakalauskas	(Lithuania) Saulius Girdauskas	Mitsubishi Lancer Evo IV	3:55:42.9	+18:04.6	2
26	6	71	(Sweden) Joakim Roman	(Sweden) Ingrid Mitakidou	(Sweden) Joakim Roman	Mitsubishi Lancer Evo V	4:02:35.5	+24:57.2	1
27	7	52	(Belgium) Bob Colsoul	(Belgium) Tom Colsoul	(Belgium) Bob Colsoul	Mitsubishi Lancer Evo V	4:04:51.3	+27:13.0	0
29	8	41	(United Kingdom) Natalie Barratt	(United Kingdom) Trevor Agnew	(United Kingdom) Natalie Barratt Rallysport	Mitsubishi Lancer Evo V	4:09:42.6	+32:04.3	0
30	9	73	(Sweden) Pelle Palmqvist	(Sweden) Håkan Jacobsson	(Sweden) Pelle Palmqvist	Mitsubishi Lancer Evo V	4:10:09.0	+32:30.7	0
31	10	68	(Sweden) Peter Hillebjörk	(Sweden) Roger Hillebjörk	(Sweden) Peter Hillebjörk	Renault Clio Sport	4:10:18.3	+32:40.0	0
32	11	57	(Sweden) Magnus Jansson	(Sweden) Thomas Fredriksson	(Sweden) Magnus Jansson	Mitsubishi Lancer Evo IV	4:17:26.0	+39:47.7	0
33	12	69	(Sweden) Anders Wänn	(Sweden) Mikael Eriksson	(Sweden) Peter Hillebjörk	Renault Clio Sport	4:18:36.0	+40:57.7	0
34	13	82	(Germany) Andreas Mansfeld	(Germany) Klaus Hartmann	(Germany) Andreas Mansfeld	Honda Integra Type-R DC2	4:19:45.0	+42:06.7	0
36	14	85	(Sweden) Lars-Erik Kronberg	(Sweden) Thomas Nilsson	(Sweden) Lars-Erik Kronberg	Suzuki Swift GTi	4:22:45.0	+45:06.7	0
37	15	75	(United Kingdom) Ben Briant	(United Kingdom) Konnie Huq	(United Kingdom) Ben Briant	Mitsubishi Lancer Evo VI	4:22:59.0	+45:20.7	0
38	16	72	(United Kingdom) Nik Elsmore	(United Kingdom) Jayson Brown	(United Kingdom) Nik Elsmore	Mitsubishi Lancer Evo VI	4:24:41.5	+47:03.2	0
39	17	84	(Sweden) Johnny Andersson	(Sweden) Robert Ardryd	(Sweden) Johnny Andersson	Suzuki Swift GTi	4:25:48.4	+48:10.1	0
40	18	81	(Sweden) Anders Knutsson	(Sweden) Ulf Gardelin	(Sweden) Anders Knutsson	Peugeot 306 S16	4:29:10.9	+51:32.6	0
Retired SS16		54	(Sweden) Oscar Svedlund	(Sweden) Björn Nilsson	(Sweden) Oscar Svedlund	Mitsubishi Lancer Evo V	Accident		0
Retired SS12		56	(Italy) Norberto Cangani	(Italy) Eros di Prima	(Italy) Norberto Cangani	Mitsubishi Lancer Evo VI	Over time limit		0
Retired SS10		70	(Sweden) Patrik Malteskog	(Sweden) Mathias Gårdman	(Sweden) Patrik Malteskog	Mitsubishi Lancer Evo IV	Retired		0
Retired SS7		51	(Russia) Stanislav Gryazin	(Russia) Dmitriy Eremeev	(Russia) Stanislav Gryazin	Mitsubishi Lancer Evo VI	Lost wheel		0
Retired SS7		80	(Norway) Tommy Slåstad	(Norway) Rune Haraldsen	(Norway) Tommy Slåstad	Opel Astra OPC	Accident		0
Retired SS6		50	(Finland) Kristian Sohlberg	(Finland) Jukka Aho	(Finland) Kristian Sohlberg	Mitsubishi Carisma GT	Accident		0
Retired SS6		74	(Norway) Einar Staff Jr.	(Norway) Thorleif Halden	(Norway) Einar Staff Jr.	Subaru Impreza WRX	Mechanical		0
Retired SS5		66	(Sweden) Matti Johansson	(Sweden) Ronny Johansson	(Sweden) Matti Johansson	Peugeot 306 S16	Driveshaft		0
Retired SS4		55	(Norway) Bernhard Kongsrud	(Norway) Geir Kirkhorn	(Norway) Bernhard Kongsrud	Mitsubishi Lancer Evo VI	Accident		0
Retired SS3		67	(Sweden) Patric Carlsson	(Sweden) Bo Fransson	(Sweden) Patric Carlsson	Peugeot 306 S16	Accident		0
Retired SS3		83	(Sweden) Lasse Storm	(Sweden) Ulf Storm	(Sweden) Lasse Storm	Citroën AX GTI	Engine		0

==== Special stages ====
Day	Stage	Stage name	Length	Winner	Car	Time	Class leaders
Leg 1 (9 Feb)	SS1	Bjälverud	20.73 km	(Sweden) Stig-Olov Walfridsson	Mitsubishi Lancer Evo VI	11:44.2	(Sweden) Stig-Olov Walfridsson
Leg 1 (9 Feb)	SS2	Lönnhöjden	18.81 km	(Sweden) Stig-Olov Walfridsson	Mitsubishi Lancer Evo VI	11:10.5	(Sweden) Stig-Olov Walfridsson
Leg 1 (9 Feb)	SS3	Bogen	12.77 km	(Sweden) Stig-Olov Walfridsson	Mitsubishi Lancer Evo VI	7:58.4	(Sweden) Stig-Olov Walfridsson
Leg 1 (9 Feb)	SS4	Granberget	49.36 km	(Sweden) Stig-Olov Walfridsson	Mitsubishi Lancer Evo VI	26:39.4	(Sweden) Stig-Olov Walfridsson
Leg 1 (9 Feb)	SS5	Torntorp	20.37 km	(Sweden) Kenneth Bäcklund	Mitsubishi Lancer Evo VI	11:19.0	(Sweden) Stig-Olov Walfridsson
Leg 1 (9 Feb)	SS6	Sagfallet	26.47 km	(Sweden) Kenneth Bäcklund	Mitsubishi Lancer Evo VI	14:22.6	(Sweden) Stig-Olov Walfridsson
Leg 2 (10 Feb)	SS7	Kullen	26.80 km	(Sweden) Stig-Olov Walfridsson	Mitsubishi Lancer Evo VI	15:11.5	(Sweden) Stig-Olov Walfridsson
Leg 2 (10 Feb)	SS8	Nyhammar 1	27.79 km	(Sweden) Stig-Olov Walfridsson	Mitsubishi Lancer Evo VI	15:40.6	(Sweden) Stig-Olov Walfridsson
Leg 2 (10 Feb)	SS9	Fredriksberg	34.60 km	(Sweden) Kenneth Bäcklund	Mitsubishi Lancer Evo VI	20:31.6	(Sweden) Stig-Olov Walfridsson
Leg 2 (10 Feb)	SS10	Silkesborg	15.30 km	(Sweden) Kenneth Bäcklund	Mitsubishi Lancer Evo VI	8:27.3	(Sweden) Stig-Olov Walfridsson
Leg 2 (10 Feb)	SS11	Nyhammar 2	27.79 km	(Sweden) Kenneth Bäcklund	Mitsubishi Lancer Evo VI	15:41.7	(Sweden) Stig-Olov Walfridsson
Leg 2 (10 Feb)	SS12	Lugnet	2.00 km	(Sweden) Stig Blomqvist	Mitsubishi Lancer Evo VI	2:06.7	(Sweden) Stig-Olov Walfridsson
Leg 3 (11 Feb)	SS13	Sågen 1	14.76 km	(Sweden) Stig-Olov Walfridsson	Mitsubishi Lancer Evo VI	8:28.3	(Sweden) Stig-Olov Walfridsson
Leg 3 (11 Feb)	SS14	Rämmen 1	23.40 km	(Sweden) Stig-Olov Walfridsson	Mitsubishi Lancer Evo VI	12:56.9	(Sweden) Stig-Olov Walfridsson
Leg 3 (11 Feb)	SS15	Sågen 2	14.76 km	(Sweden) Stig-Olov Walfridsson	Mitsubishi Lancer Evo VI	8:27.7	(Sweden) Stig-Olov Walfridsson
Leg 3 (11 Feb)	SS16	Rämmen 2	23.40 km	(Sweden) Stig-Olov Walfridsson	Mitsubishi Lancer Evo VI	12:59.9	(Sweden) Stig-Olov Walfridsson
Leg 3 (11 Feb)	SS17	Hagfors	21.20 km	(Sweden) Kenneth Bäcklund	Mitsubishi Lancer Evo VI	13:11.2	(Sweden) Stig-Olov Walfridsson

==== Championship standings ====
Pos.	Drivers' championships		
Pos.	Move	Driver	Points
1		(Switzerland) Olivier Gillet	10
2	New entry	(Sweden) Stig-Olov Walfridsson	10
3	1	(Austria) Manfred Stohl	6
4	New entry	(Sweden) Kenneth Bäcklund	6
5	2	(Uruguay) Gustavo Trelles	4
