= 2002 Monte Carlo Rally =

1st round of the 2002 World Rally Championship

2002 Monte Carlo Rally 70th Rallye Automobile de Monte-Carlo
Round 1 of the 2002 World Rally Championship season
Next event →
- Host country: Monaco
- Rally base: Monaco
- Dates run: January 18, 2002 – January 20, 2002
- Stages: 15 (388.38 km; 241.33 miles)
- Stage surface: Asphalt/snow
- Overall distance: 1,424.55 km (885.17 miles)

Statistics
- Crews: 55 at start, 26 at finish

Overall results
- Overall winner: (Finland) Tommi Mäkinen (Finland) Kaj Lindström (Japan) 555 Subaru World Rally Team; Subaru Impreza S7 WRC '01

The 2002 Monte Carlo Rally (formally the 70th Rallye Automobile de Monte-Carlo) was the first round of the 2002 World Rally Championship. The race was held over three days between 18 January and 20 January 2002, and was won by Subaru's Tommi Mäkinen, his 24th win in the World Rally Championship. Citroën's Sébastien Loeb, won the rally temporarily but received a two-minute time penalty due to an illegal tire change during the second day.

== Background ==
=== Entry list ===
No.	Driver	Co-Driver	Entrant	Car	Tyre
World Rally Championship manufacturer entries
1	(United Kingdom) Richard Burns	(United Kingdom) Robert Reid	(France) Peugeot Total	Peugeot 206 WRC	M
2	(Finland) Marcus Grönholm	(Finland) Timo Rautiainen	(France) Peugeot Total	Peugeot 206 WRC	M
3	(France) Gilles Panizzi	(France) Hervé Panizzi	(France) Peugeot Total	Peugeot 206 WRC	M
4	(Spain) Carlos Sainz	(Spain) Luis Moya	(United Kingdom) Ford Motor Co. Ltd.	Ford Focus RS WRC '02	P
5	(United Kingdom) Colin McRae	(United Kingdom) Nicky Grist	(United Kingdom) Ford Motor Co. Ltd.	Ford Focus RS WRC '02	P
6	(Estonia) Markko Märtin	(United Kingdom) Michael Park	(United Kingdom) Ford Motor Co. Ltd.	Ford Focus RS WRC '01	P
7	(France) François Delecour	(France) Daniel Grataloup	(Japan) Marlboro Mitsubishi Ralliart	Mitsubishi Lancer WRC	M
8	(United Kingdom) Alister McRae	(United Kingdom) David Senior	(Japan) Marlboro Mitsubishi Ralliart	Mitsubishi Lancer WRC	M
10	(Finland) Tommi Mäkinen	(Finland) Kaj Lindström	(Japan) 555 Subaru World Rally Team	Subaru Impreza S7 WRC '01	P
11	(Norway) Petter Solberg	(United Kingdom) Phil Mills	(Japan) 555 Subaru World Rally Team	Subaru Impreza S7 WRC '01	P
14	(Sweden) Kenneth Eriksson	(Sweden) Tina Thörner	(Czech Republic) Škoda Motorsport	Škoda Octavia WRC Evo2	M
15	(Finland) Toni Gardemeister	(Finland) Paavo Lukander	(Czech Republic) Škoda Motorsport	Škoda Octavia WRC Evo2	M
16	(Czech Republic) Roman Kresta	(Czech Republic) Jan Tománek	(Czech Republic) Škoda Motorsport	Škoda Octavia WRC Evo2	M
17	(Germany) Armin Schwarz	(Germany) Manfred Hiemer	(South Korea) Hyundai Castrol World Rally Team	Hyundai Accent WRC2	M
18	(Belgium) Freddy Loix	(Belgium) Sven Smeets	(South Korea) Hyundai Castrol World Rally Team	Hyundai Accent WRC2	M
World Rally Championship entries
20	(Sweden) Thomas Rådström	(France) Denis Giraudet	(France) Automobiles Citroën	Citroën Xsara WRC	M
21	(France) Sébastien Loeb	(Monaco) Daniel Elena	(France) Automobiles Citroën	Citroën Xsara WRC	M
22	(France) Philippe Bugalski	(France) Jean-Paul Chiaroni	(France) Automobiles Citroën	Citroën Xsara WRC	M
24	(France) Didier Auriol	(France) Jack Boyere	(France) Didier Auriol	Toyota Corolla WRC	M
25	(Finland) Harri Rovanperä	(Finland) Risto Pietiläinen	(France) Bozian Racing	Peugeot 206 WRC	M
26	(Belgium) Bruno Thiry	(Belgium) Stéphane Prévot	(Belgium) Bruno Thiry	Peugeot 206 WRC	M
27	(Germany) Armin Kremer	(Germany) Klaus Wicha	(Germany) Armin Kremer	Ford Focus RS WRC '01	P
29	(Austria) Manfred Stohl	(Austria) Ilka Minor	(Austria) Manfred Stohl	Toyota Corolla WRC	P
31	(Switzerland) Olivier Burri	(Switzerland) Christophe Hofmann	(Switzerland) Olivier Burri	Peugeot 206 WRC	P
31	(Monaco) Richard Hein	(France) Philippe Servol	(Monaco) Richard Hein	Subaru Impreza S5 WRC '98	—N/a
33	(Italy) Riccardo Errani	(Italy) Stefano Casadio	(Italy) Riccardo Errani	Škoda Octavia WRC	—N/a
34	(Italy) Marco Menegatto	(Italy) Massimiliano Cerrai	(Italy) Marco Menegatto	Toyota Corolla WRC	P
35	(Italy) Emanuele Dati	(Italy) Massimo Chiapponi	(Italy) Emanuele Dati	Ford Focus RS WRC '99	P
JWRC entries
51	(Italy) Andrea Dallavilla	(Italy) Giovanni Bernacchini	(Italy) Vieffe Corse SRL	Citroën Saxo S1600	M
52	(United Kingdom) Niall McShea	(United Kingdom) Michael Orr	(Germany) Opel Motorsport	Opel Corsa S1600	M
53	(Italy) Giandomenico Basso	(Italy) Luigi Pirollo	(Italy) Top Run SRL	Fiat Punto S1600	M
54	(Norway) Martin Stenshorne	(United Kingdom) Clive Jenkins	(Germany) Opel Motorsport	Opel Corsa S1600	M
55	(Belgium) François Duval	(Belgium) Jean-Marc Fortin	(United Kingdom) Ford Motor Co. Ltd.	Ford Puma S1600	M
56	(Finland) Jussi Välimäki	(Finland) Tero Gardemeister	(France) Citroën Sport	Citroën Saxo S1600	M
57	(Paraguay) Alejandro Galanti	(Spain) Xavier Amigó	(Italy) Astra Racing	Ford Puma S1600	M
58	(Italy) Christian Chemin	(Italy) Simone Scattolin	(Italy) Hawk Racing Club	Fiat Punto S1600	M
59	(Finland) Juha Kangas	(Finland) Mika Ovaskainen	(Japan) Suzuki Sport	Suzuki Ignis S1600	M
60	(Italy) Nicola Caldani	(Italy) Sauro Farnocchia	(Italy) Procar Rally Team	Peugeot 206 S1600	M
61	(United Kingdom) Gwyndaf Evans	(United Kingdom) Chris Patterson	(United Kingdom) MG Sport & Racing	MG ZR S1600	M
62	(Finland) Janne Tuohino	(Finland) Petri Vihavainen	(France) Citroën Sport	Citroën Saxo S1600	M
63	(United Kingdom) Martin Rowe	(United Kingdom) Chris Wood	(Italy) Astra Racing	Ford Puma S1600	M
64	(Italy) Gianluigi Galli	(Italy) Guido D'Amore	(Italy) Top Run SRL	Fiat Punto S1600	M
65	(Spain) Daniel Solà	(Spain) David Moreno	(France) Citroën Sport	Citroën Saxo S1600	M
66	(San Marino) Mirco Baldacci	(Italy) Maurizio Barone	(Italy) Vieffe Corse SRL	Citroën Saxo S1600	M
67	(Sweden) Daniel Carlsson	(Sweden) Per Karlsson	(Italy) Astra Racing	Ford Puma S1600	M
68	(Germany) Nikolaus Schelle	(Germany) Gerhard Weiss	(Japan) Suzuki Sport	Suzuki Ignis S1600	M
69	(Finland) Kosti Katajamäki	(Finland) Lasse Hirvijärvi	(Germany) Volkswagen Racing	Volkswagen Polo S1600	M
70	(Germany) Sven Haaf	(Germany) Michael Kölbach	(France) Citroën Sport	Citroën Saxo S1600	M
71	(Austria) David Doppelreiter	(Austria) Thomas Lettner	(Austria) Schmidt Racing	Peugeot 206 S1600	M
72	(Spain) Marc Blázquez	(Spain) Oriol Julià	(Italy) Astra Racing	Ford Puma S1600	M
73	(Andorra) Albert Lloverá	(Spain) Marc Corral	(Spain) Pronto Racing	Fiat Punto S1600	M
75	(Japan) Kazuhiko Niwa	(Japan) Kohei Kusaka	(Japan) Suzuki Sport	Suzuki Ignis S1600	M
76	(Norway) Alexander Foss	(United Kingdom) Claire Mole	(United Kingdom) Ford Motor Co. Ltd.	Ford Puma S1600	M
77	(Spain) Paco Roig	(Spain) Joan Sureda	(Spain) Fiat Auto España	Fiat Punto S1600	M
78	(Lebanon) Roger Feghali	(Italy) Nicola Arena	(Italy) Astra Racing	Ford Puma S1600	M

=== Itinerary ===
All dates and times are CET (UTC+1).

Date	Time	No.	Stage name	Distance
Leg 1 — 157.70 km
18 January	09:48	SS1	Selonnet — Turriers 1	28.74 km
18 January	11:06	SS2	Sisteron — Thoard 1	36.73 km
18 January	13:39	SS3	Selonnet — Turriers 2	28.74 km
18 January	14:57	SS4	Sisteron — Thoard 2	36.73 km
18 January	18:25	SS5	Puget Théniers — Toudon 1	26.76 km
Leg 2 — 131.88 km
19 January	10:08	SS6	Pont de Clans — Villars sur Var	12.08 km
19 January	10:51	SS7	Puget Théniers — Toudon 2	26.76 km
19 January	13:49	SS8	Coaraze — Loda 1	23.05 km
19 January	14:32	SS9	La Bollène — Turini — Moulinet 1	23.47 km
19 January	18:09	SS10	Coaraze — Loda 2	23.05 km
19 January	18:56	SS11	La Bollène — Turini — Moulinet 2	23.47 km
Leg 3 — 98.80 km
20 January	09:13	SS12	Sospel — Turini — La Bollène 1	32.85 km
20 January	10:08	SS13	Loda — Lucéram 1	16.55 km
20 January	12:33	SS14	Sospel — Turini — La Bollène 2	32.85 km
20 January	13:28	SS15	Loda — Lucéram 2	16.55 km

== Results ==
=== Overall ===
Pos.	No.	Driver	Co-driver	Team	Car	Time	Difference	Points
1	10	(Finland) Tommi Mäkinen	(Finland) Kaj Lindström	(Japan) 555 Subaru World Rally Team	Subaru Impreza S7 WRC '01	3:59:30.7		10
2	21	(France) Sébastien Loeb	(Monaco) Daniel Elena	(France) Automobiles Citroën	Citroën Xsara WRC	4:00:44.8	+1:14.1	6
3	4	(Spain) Carlos Sainz	(Spain) Luis Moya	(United Kingdom) Ford Motor Co. Ltd.	Ford Focus RS WRC '02	4:00:46.4	+1:15.7	4
4	5	(United Kingdom) Colin McRae	(United Kingdom) Nicky Grist	(United Kingdom) Ford Motor Co. Ltd.	Ford Focus RS WRC '02	4:01:28.7	+1:58.0	3
5	2	(Finland) Marcus Grönholm	(Finland) Timo Rautiainen	(France) Peugeot Total	Peugeot 206 WRC	4:01:38.1	+2:07.4	2
6	11	(Norway) Petter Solberg	(United Kingdom) Phil Mills	(Japan) 555 Subaru World Rally Team	Subaru Impreza S7 WRC '01	4:02:00.3	+2:29.6	1

=== World Rally Cars ===
==== Classification ====
Position		No.	Driver	Co-driver	Entrant	Car	Time	Difference	Points
Event	Class	No.	Driver	Co-driver	Entrant	Car	Time	Difference	Points
1	1	10	(Finland) Tommi Mäkinen	(Finland) Kaj Lindström	(Japan) 555 Subaru World Rally Team	Subaru Impreza S7 WRC '01	3:59:30.7		10
3	2	4	(Spain) Carlos Sainz	(Spain) Luis Moya	(United Kingdom) Ford Motor Co. Ltd.	Ford Focus RS WRC '02	4:00:46.4	+1:15.7	4
4	3	5	(United Kingdom) Colin McRae	(United Kingdom) Nicky Grist	(United Kingdom) Ford Motor Co. Ltd.	Ford Focus RS WRC '02	4:01:28.7	+1:58.0	3
5	4	2	(Finland) Marcus Grönholm	(Finland) Timo Rautiainen	(France) Peugeot Total	Peugeot 206 WRC	4:01:38.1	+2:07.4	2
6	5	11	(Norway) Petter Solberg	(United Kingdom) Phil Mills	(Japan) 555 Subaru World Rally Team	Subaru Impreza S7 WRC '01	4:02:00.3	+2:29.6	1
7	6	3	(France) Gilles Panizzi	(France) Hervé Panizzi	(France) Peugeot Total	Peugeot 206 WRC	4:02:50.8	+3:20.1	0
8	7	1	(United Kingdom) Richard Burns	(United Kingdom) Robert Reid	(France) Peugeot Total	Peugeot 206 WRC	4:03:47.1	+4:16.4	0
9	8	7	(France) François Delecour	(France) Daniel Grataloup	(Japan) Marlboro Mitsubishi Ralliart	Mitsubishi Lancer WRC	4:05:06.4	+5:35.7	0
10	9	15	(Finland) Toni Gardemeister	(Finland) Paavo Lukander	(Czech Republic) Škoda Motorsport	Škoda Octavia WRC Evo2	4:06:13.1	+6:42.4	0
12	10	6	(Estonia) Markko Märtin	(United Kingdom) Michael Park	(United Kingdom) Ford Motor Co. Ltd.	Ford Focus RS WRC '01	4:07:33.0	+8:02.3	0
13	11	14	(Sweden) Kenneth Eriksson	(Sweden) Tina Thörner	(Czech Republic) Škoda Motorsport	Škoda Octavia WRC Evo2	4:09:40.5	+10:09.8	0
14	12	8	(United Kingdom) Alister McRae	(United Kingdom) David Senior	(Japan) Marlboro Mitsubishi Ralliart	Mitsubishi Lancer WRC	4:10:58.3	+11:27.6	0
Retired SS7		16	(Czech Republic) Roman Kresta	(Czech Republic) Jan Tománek	(Czech Republic) Škoda Motorsport	Škoda Octavia WRC Evo2	Accident		0
Retired SS4		17	(Germany) Armin Schwarz	(Germany) Manfred Hiemer	(South Korea) Hyundai Castrol World Rally Team	Hyundai Accent WRC2	Accident		0
Retired SS3		18	(Belgium) Freddy Loix	(Belgium) Sven Smeets	(South Korea) Hyundai Castrol World Rally Team	Hyundai Accent WRC2	Accident		0

==== Special stages ====
Day	Stage	Stage name	Length	Winner	Car	Time	Class leaders
Leg 1 (18 Jan)	SS1	Selonnet — Turriers 1	28.74 km	(Spain) Carlos Sainz	Ford Focus RS WRC '02	17:54.3	(Spain) Carlos Sainz
Leg 1 (18 Jan)	SS2	Sisteron — Thoard 1	36.73 km	Stage cancelled			(Spain) Carlos Sainz
Leg 1 (18 Jan)	SS3	Selonnet — Turriers 2	28.74 km	(Norway) Petter Solberg	Subaru Impreza S7 WRC '01	17:15.9	(Finland) Tommi Mäkinen
Leg 1 (18 Jan)	SS4	Sisteron — Thoard 2	36.73 km	(France) Sébastien Loeb	Citroën Xsara WRC	23:41.1	(France) Sébastien Loeb
Leg 1 (18 Jan)	SS5	Puget Théniers — Toudon 1	26.76 km	(France) Sébastien Loeb	Citroën Xsara WRC	17:44.7	(France) Sébastien Loeb
Leg 2 (19 Jan)	SS6	Pont de Clans — Villars sur Var	12.08 km	(Norway) Petter Solberg	Subaru Impreza S7 WRC '01	9:44.5	(France) Sébastien Loeb
Leg 2 (19 Jan)	SS7	Puget Théniers — Toudon 2	26.76 km	(France) Sébastien Loeb	Citroën Xsara WRC	17:30.7	(France) Sébastien Loeb
Leg 2 (19 Jan)	SS8	Coaraze — Loda 1	23.05 km	(Finland) Tommi Mäkinen	Subaru Impreza S7 WRC '01	15:56.6	(France) Sébastien Loeb
Leg 2 (19 Jan)	SS9	La Bollène — Turini — Moulinet 1	23.47 km	(Finland) Tommi Mäkinen	Subaru Impreza S7 WRC '01	15:58.6	(France) Sébastien Loeb
Leg 2 (19 Jan)	SS10	Coaraze — Loda 2	23.05 km	(France) Sébastien Loeb	Citroën Xsara WRC	16:08.2	(France) Sébastien Loeb
Leg 2 (19 Jan)	SS11	La Bollène — Turini — Moulinet 2	23.47 km	(Finland) Tommi Mäkinen	Subaru Impreza S7 WRC '01	16:21.4	(Finland) Tommi Mäkinen
Leg 3 (20 Jan)	SS12	Sospel — Turini — La Bollène 1	32.85 km	(Norway) Petter Solberg	Subaru Impreza S7 WRC '01	22:38.4	(Finland) Tommi Mäkinen
Leg 3 (20 Jan)	SS13	Loda — Lucéram 1	16.55 km	(France) Sébastien Loeb	Citroën Xsara WRC	12:03.9	(Finland) Tommi Mäkinen
Leg 3 (20 Jan)	SS14	Sospel — Turini — La Bollène 2	32.85 km	(Norway) Petter Solberg	Subaru Impreza S7 WRC '01	22:02.2	(Finland) Tommi Mäkinen
Leg 3 (20 Jan)	SS15	Loda — Lucéram 2	16.55 km	(Norway) Petter Solberg	Subaru Impreza S7 WRC '01	11:52.7	(Finland) Tommi Mäkinen

==== Championship standings ====
Pos.	Drivers' championships			Co-drivers' championships			Manufacturers' championships		
Pos.	Move	Driver	Points	Move	Co-driver	Points	Move	Manufacturer	Points
1	New entry	(Finland) Tommi Mäkinen	10	New entry	(Finland) Kaj Lindström	10	New entry	(Japan) 555 Subaru World Rally Team	12
2	New entry	(France) Sébastien Loeb	6	New entry	(Monaco) Daniel Elena	6	New entry	(United Kingdom) Ford Motor Co. Ltd.	10
3	New entry	(Spain) Carlos Sainz	4	New entry	(Spain) Luis Moya	4	New entry	(France) Peugeot Total	4
4	New entry	(United Kingdom) Colin McRae	3	New entry	(United Kingdom) Nicky Grist	3	New entry	(Japan) Marlboro Mitsubishi Ralliart	0
5	New entry	(Finland) Marcus Grönholm	2	New entry	(Finland) Timo Rautiainen	2	New entry	(Czech Republic) Škoda Motorsport	0

=== Junior World Rally Championship ===
==== Classification ====
Position		No.	Driver	Co-driver	Entrant	Car	Time	Difference	Points
Event	Class	No.	Driver	Co-driver	Entrant	Car	Time	Difference	Points
17	1	55	(Belgium) François Duval	(Belgium) Jean-Marc Fortin	(United Kingdom) Ford Motor Co. Ltd.	Ford Puma S1600	4:25:06.2		10
18	2	60	(Italy) Nicola Caldani	(Italy) Sauro Farnocchia	(Italy) Procar Rally Team	Peugeot 206 S1600	4:29:21.1	+4:14.9	6
19	3	78	(Lebanon) Roger Feghali	(Italy) Nicola Arena	(Italy) Astra Racing	Ford Puma S1600	4:32:16.6	+7:10.4	4
20	4	67	(Sweden) Daniel Carlsson	(Sweden) Per Karlsson	(Italy) Astra Racing	Ford Puma S1600	4:32:30.3	+7:24.1	3
21	5	71	(Austria) David Doppelreiter	(Austria) Thomas Lettner	(Austria) Schmidt Racing	Peugeot 206 S1600	4:34:53.8	+9:47.6	2
22	6	68	(Germany) Nikolaus Schelle	(Germany) Gerhard Weiss	(Japan) Suzuki Sport	Suzuki Ignis S1600	4:34:56.6	+9:50.4	1
24	7	76	(Norway) Alexander Foss	(United Kingdom) Claire Mole	(United Kingdom) Ford Motor Co. Ltd.	Ford Puma S1600	4:42:36.5	+17:30.3	0
25	8	57	(Paraguay) Alejandro Galanti	(Spain) Xavier Amigó	(Italy) Astra Racing	Ford Puma S1600	4:51:08.0	+26:01.8	0
26	9	59	(Finland) Juha Kangas	(Finland) Mika Ovaskainen	(Japan) Suzuki Sport	Suzuki Ignis S1600	4:51:54.2	+26:48.0	0
Retired SS14		72	(Spain) Marc Blázquez	(Spain) Oriol Julià	(Italy) Astra Racing	Ford Puma S1600	Brakes		0
Retired SS13		73	(Andorra) Albert Lloverá	(Spain) Marc Corral	(Spain) Pronto Racing	Fiat Punto S1600	Accident		0
Retired SS10		63	(United Kingdom) Martin Rowe	(United Kingdom) Chris Wood	(Italy) Astra Racing	Ford Puma S1600	Alternator		0
Retired SS10		64	(Italy) Gianluigi Galli	(Italy) Guido D'Amore	(Italy) Top Run SRL	Fiat Punto S1600	Accident		0
Retired SS7		58	(Italy) Christian Chemin	(Italy) Simone Scattolin	(Italy) Hawk Racing Club	Fiat Punto S1600	Engine		0
Retired SS6		54	(Norway) Martin Stenshorne	(United Kingdom) Clive Jenkins	(Germany) Opel Motorsport	Opel Corsa S1600	Accident		0
Retired SS4		53	(Italy) Giandomenico Basso	(Italy) Luigi Pirollo	(Italy) Top Run SRL	Fiat Punto S1600	Accident		0
Retired SS4		62	(Finland) Janne Tuohino	(Finland) Petri Vihavainen	(France) Citroën Sport	Citroën Saxo S1600	Clutch		0
Retired SS4		65	(Spain) Daniel Solà	(Spain) David Moreno	(France) Citroën Sport	Citroën Saxo S1600	Clutch		0
Retired SS4		66	(San Marino) Mirco Baldacci	(Italy) Maurizio Barone	(Italy) Vieffe Corse SRL	Citroën Saxo S1600	Clutch		0
Retired SS3		61	(United Kingdom) Gwyndaf Evans	(United Kingdom) Chris Patterson	(United Kingdom) MG Sport & Racing	MG ZR S1600	Accident		0
Retired SS3		69	(Finland) Kosti Katajamäki	(Finland) Lasse Hirvijärvi	(Germany) Volkswagen Racing	Volkswagen Polo S1600	Accident		0
Retired SS3		70	(Germany) Sven Haaf	(Germany) Michael Kölbach	(France) Citroën Sport	Citroën Saxo S1600	Transmission		0
Retired SS1		51	(Italy) Andrea Dallavilla	(Italy) Giovanni Bernacchini	(Italy) Vieffe Corse SRL	Citroën Saxo S1600	Clutch		0
Retired SS1		52	(United Kingdom) Niall McShea	(United Kingdom) Michael Orr	(Germany) Opel Motorsport	Opel Corsa S1600	Accident		0
Retired SS1		56	(Finland) Jussi Välimäki	(Finland) Tero Gardemeister	(France) Citroën Sport	Citroën Saxo S1600	Clutch		0
Retired SS1		75	(Japan) Kazuhiko Niwa	(Japan) Kohei Kusaka	(Japan) Suzuki Sport	Suzuki Ignis S1600	Alternator		0
Retired SS1		77	(Spain) Paco Roig	(Spain) Joan Sureda	(Spain) Fiat Auto España	Fiat Punto S1600	Accident		0

==== Special stages ====
Day	Stage	Stage name	Length	Winner	Car	Time	Class leaders
Leg 1 (18 Jan)	SS1	Selonnet — Turriers 1	28.74 km	(Spain) Daniel Solà	Citroën Saxo S1600	19:35.7	(Spain) Daniel Solà
Leg 1 (18 Jan)	SS2	Sisteron — Thoard 1	36.73 km	Stage cancelled			(Spain) Daniel Solà
Leg 1 (18 Jan)	SS3	Selonnet — Turriers 2	28.74 km	(Belgium) François Duval	Ford Puma S1600	18:48.6	(Belgium) François Duval
Leg 1 (18 Jan)	SS4	Sisteron — Thoard 2	36.73 km	(Italy) Gianluigi Galli	Fiat Punto S1600	26:17.7	(Italy) Gianluigi Galli
Leg 1 (18 Jan)	SS5	Puget Théniers — Toudon 1	26.76 km	(Italy) Gianluigi Galli	Fiat Punto S1600	19:52.0	(Italy) Gianluigi Galli
Leg 2 (19 Jan)	SS6	Pont de Clans — Villars sur Var	12.08 km	(Belgium) François Duval	Ford Puma S1600	10:21.6	(Italy) Gianluigi Galli
Leg 2 (19 Jan)	SS7	Puget Théniers — Toudon 2	26.76 km	(Italy) Gianluigi Galli	Fiat Punto S1600	19:03.1	(Italy) Gianluigi Galli
Leg 2 (19 Jan)	SS8	Coaraze — Loda 1	23.05 km	(Italy) Gianluigi Galli	Fiat Punto S1600	17:12.0	(Italy) Gianluigi Galli
Leg 2 (19 Jan)	SS9	La Bollène — Turini — Moulinet 1	23.47 km	(Italy) Gianluigi Galli	Fiat Punto S1600	17:22.6	(Italy) Gianluigi Galli
Leg 2 (19 Jan)	SS10	Coaraze — Loda 2	23.05 km	(Sweden) Daniel Carlsson	Ford Puma S1600	18:18.6	(Belgium) François Duval
Leg 2 (19 Jan)	SS11	La Bollène — Turini — Moulinet 2	23.47 km	(Italy) Nicola Caldani	Peugeot 206 S1600	18:26.1	(Belgium) François Duval
Leg 3 (20 Jan)	SS12	Sospel — Turini — La Bollène 1	32.85 km	(Italy) Nicola Caldani	Peugeot 206 S1600	24:41.0	(Belgium) François Duval
Leg 3 (20 Jan)	SS13	Loda — Lucéram 1	16.55 km	(Belgium) François Duval	Ford Puma S1600	13:34.3	(Belgium) François Duval
Leg 3 (20 Jan)	SS14	Sospel — Turini — La Bollène 2	32.85 km	(Italy) Nicola Caldani	Peugeot 206 S1600	24:30.5	(Belgium) François Duval
Leg 3 (20 Jan)	SS15	Loda — Lucéram 2	16.55 km	(Sweden) Daniel Carlsson	Ford Puma S1600	13:15.8	(Belgium) François Duval

==== Championship standings ====
Pos.	Drivers' championships		
Pos.	Move	Driver	Points
1	New entry	(Belgium) François Duval	10
2	New entry	(Italy) Nicola Caldani	6
3	New entry	(Lebanon) Roger Feghali	4
4	New entry	(Sweden) Daniel Carlsson	3
5	New entry	(Austria) David Doppelreiter	2
