= 2002 Swedish Rally =

2nd round of the 2002 World Rally Championship

2002 Swedish Rally 51st Uddeholm Swedish Rally
Round 2 of the 2002 World Rally Championship season
← Previous event	Next event →
- Host country: Sweden
- Rally base: Karlstad
- Dates run: February 1, 2002 – February 3, 2002
- Stages: 16 (381.96 km; 237.34 miles)
- Stage surface: Snow/ice
- Overall distance: 1,853.33 km (1,151.61 miles)

Statistics
- Crews: 76 at start, 51 at finish

Overall results
- Overall winner: (Finland) Marcus Grönholm (Finland) Timo Rautiainen (France) Peugeot Total; Peugeot 206 WRC

The 2002 Swedish Rally (formally the 51st Uddeholm Swedish Rally) was the second round of the 2002 World Rally Championship. The race was held over three days between 1 February and 3 February 2002, and was won by Peugeot's Marcus Grönholm, his 8th win in the World Rally Championship.

== Background ==
=== Entry list ===
No.	Driver	Co-Driver	Entrant	Car	Tyre
World Rally Championship manufacturer entries
1	(United Kingdom) Richard Burns	(United Kingdom) Robert Reid	(France) Peugeot Total	Peugeot 206 WRC	M
2	(Finland) Marcus Grönholm	(Finland) Timo Rautiainen	(France) Peugeot Total	Peugeot 206 WRC	M
3	(Finland) Harri Rovanperä	(Finland) Risto Pietiläinen	(France) Peugeot Total	Peugeot 206 WRC	M
4	(Spain) Carlos Sainz	(Spain) Luis Moya	(United Kingdom) Ford Motor Co. Ltd.	Ford Focus RS WRC '02	P
5	(United Kingdom) Colin McRae	(United Kingdom) Nicky Grist	(United Kingdom) Ford Motor Co. Ltd.	Ford Focus RS WRC '02	P
6	(Estonia) Markko Märtin	(United Kingdom) Michael Park	(United Kingdom) Ford Motor Co. Ltd.	Ford Focus RS WRC '01	P
7	(France) François Delecour	(France) Daniel Grataloup	(Japan) Marlboro Mitsubishi Ralliart	Mitsubishi Lancer WRC	M
8	(United Kingdom) Alister McRae	(United Kingdom) David Senior	(Japan) Marlboro Mitsubishi Ralliart	Mitsubishi Lancer WRC	M
9	(Finland) Jani Paasonen	(Finland) Arto Kapanen	(Japan) Marlboro Mitsubishi Ralliart	Mitsubishi Lancer WRC	M
10	(Finland) Tommi Mäkinen	(Finland) Kaj Lindström	(Japan) 555 Subaru World Rally Team	Subaru Impreza S7 WRC '01	P
11	(Norway) Petter Solberg	(United Kingdom) Phil Mills	(Japan) 555 Subaru World Rally Team	Subaru Impreza S7 WRC '01	P
14	(Sweden) Kenneth Eriksson	(Sweden) Tina Thörner	(Czech Republic) Škoda Motorsport	Škoda Octavia WRC Evo2	M
15	(Finland) Toni Gardemeister	(Finland) Paavo Lukander	(Czech Republic) Škoda Motorsport	Škoda Octavia WRC Evo2	M
16	(Sweden) Stig Blomqvist	(Venezuela) Ana Goñi	(Czech Republic) Škoda Motorsport	Škoda Octavia WRC Evo2	M
17	(Germany) Armin Schwarz	(Germany) Manfred Hiemer	(South Korea) Hyundai Castrol World Rally Team	Hyundai Accent WRC2	M
18	(Belgium) Freddy Loix	(Belgium) Sven Smeets	(South Korea) Hyundai Castrol World Rally Team	Hyundai Accent WRC2	M
19	(Finland) Juha Kankkunen	(Finland) Juha Repo	(South Korea) Hyundai Castrol World Rally Team	Hyundai Accent WRC2	M
World Rally Championship entries
20	(Sweden) Thomas Rådström	(France) Denis Giraudet	(France) Automobiles Citroën	Citroën Xsara WRC	M
21	(France) Sébastien Loeb	(Monaco) Daniel Elena	(France) Automobiles Citroën	Citroën Xsara WRC	M
23	(Belgium) François Duval	(Belgium) Jean-Marc Fortin	(Belgium) François Duval	Ford Focus RS WRC '01	P
24	(France) Gilles Panizzi	(France) Hervé Panizzi	(France) Bozian Racing	Peugeot 206 WRC	M
31	(Finland) Sebastian Lindholm	(Finland) Timo Hantunen	(Finland) Sebastian Lindholm	Peugeot 206 WRC	—N/a
32	(Norway) Henning Solberg	(Norway) Cato Menkerud	(Norway) Henning Solberg	Toyota Corolla WRC	—N/a
33	(Finland) Janne Tuohino	(Finland) Petri Vihavainen	(Finland) Janne Tuohino	Ford Focus RS WRC '01	P
34	(Finland) Juuso Pykälistö	(Finland) Esko Mertsalmi	(Finland) Juuso Pykälistö	Toyota Corolla WRC	—N/a
101	(Norway) Kristian Kolberg	(Norway) Kjell Pettersen	(Norway) Kristian Kolberg	Hyundai Accent WRC2	—N/a
102	(Finland) Jussi Välimäki	(Finland) Tero Gardemeister	(Finland) Jussi Välimäki	Toyota Corolla WRC	—N/a
103	(Sweden) Johan Kressner	(Sweden) Leif Wigert	(Sweden) Johan Kressner	Subaru Impreza S5 WRC '98	P
104	(Norway) Thomas Kolberg	(Norway) Ola Fløene	(Norway) Thomas Kolberg	Hyundai Accent WRC2	—N/a
113	(Poland) Tomasz Kuchar	(Poland) Maciej Szczepaniak	(Poland) Tomasz Kuchar	Toyota Corolla WRC	—N/a
114	(Czech Republic) Tomáš Hrdinka	(Czech Republic) Petr Gross	(Slovakia) Styllex Tuning Prosport	Subaru Impreza S6 WRC '00	P
115	(Greece) Ioannis Papadimitriou	(United Kingdom) Allan Harryman	(Greece) Ioannis Papadimitriou	Subaru Impreza 555	P
PWRC entries
51	(Uruguay) Gustavo Trelles	(Argentina) Jorge Del Buono	(Italy) Mauro Rally Tuning	Mitsubishi Lancer Evo VI	—N/a
53	(Italy) Alessandro Fiorio	(Italy) Enrico Cantoni	(Italy) Ralliart Italia	Mitsubishi Lancer Evo VII	—N/a
55	(Lithuania) Saulius Girdauskas	(Lithuania) Žilvinas Sakalauskas	(Lithuania) TDS Racing	Mitsubishi Lancer Evo VI	—N/a
57	(Japan) Toshihiro Arai	(New Zealand) Tony Sircombe	(Japan) Spike Subaru Team	Subaru Impreza WRX STI	—N/a
59	(United Kingdom) Natalie Barratt	(United Kingdom) Roger Freeman	(United Kingdom) Natalie Barratt Rallysport	Mitsubishi Lancer Evo VI	—N/a
60	(United Kingdom) Ben Briant	(United Kingdom) Jayson Brown	(United Kingdom) Mitsubishi Ralliart UK	Mitsubishi Lancer Evo VI	—N/a
62	(Italy) Norberto Cangani	(Italy) Eros di Prima	(Italy) Top Run SRL	Mitsubishi Lancer Evo VI	—N/a
66	(Bulgaria) Dimitar Iliev	(Bulgaria) Petar Sivov	(Italy) Mauro Rally Tuning	Mitsubishi Lancer Evo VII	—N/a
67	(Finland) Marko Ipatti	(Finland) Kari Kajula	(Finland) RallyRent Europe	Mitsubishi Lancer Evo VI	—N/a
69	(Norway) Bernt Kollevold	(Norway) Olav Bodilsen	(Norway) Kollevold Rally Team	Mitsubishi Lancer Evo VI	—N/a
72	(Sweden) Joakim Roman	(Sweden) Ingrid Mitakidou	(Sweden) Milbrooks World Rally Team	Mitsubishi Lancer Evo V	—N/a
73	(United Kingdom) Martin Rowe	(United Kingdom) Chris Wood	(United Kingdom) David Sutton Cars Ltd	Mitsubishi Lancer Evo VI	—N/a
75	(Finland) Kristian Sohlberg	(Finland) Jukka Aho	Mitsubishi Ralliart Finland	Mitsubishi Lancer Evo VI	—N/a
76	(Czech Republic) Pavel Valoušek	(Italy) Pierangelo Scalvini	(Italy) Jolly Club	Mitsubishi Lancer Evo VI	—N/a

=== Itinerary ===
All dates and times are CET (UTC+1).

Date	Time	No.	Stage name	Distance
Leg 1 — 124.05 km
1 February	08:29	SS1	Sågen 1	14.17 km
1 February	09:20	SS2	Rämmen 1	23.16 km
1 February	11:47	SS3	Granberget 1	40.51 km
1 February	15:11	SS4	Fredriksberg 1	18.14 km
1 February	15:54	SS5	Lejen 1	28.07 km
Leg 2 — 129.09 km
2 February	08:55	SS6	Granberget 2	40.51 km
2 February	12:09	SS7	Fredriksberg 2	18.14 km
2 February	12:52	SS8	Lejen 2	28.07 km
2 February	12:05	SS9	Malta	11.25 km
2 February	15:37	SS10	Hara	11.91 km
2 February	16:11	SS11	Torntorp 1	19.21 km
Leg 3 — 128.82 km
3 February	08:29	SS12	Sågen 2	14.17 km
3 February	09:20	SS13	Rämmen 2	23.16 km
3 February	10:59	SS14	Vargåsen	32.43 km
3 February	11:59	SS15	Torntorp 2	19.21 km
3 February	13:52	SS16	Hagfors 2002	39.85 km

== Results ==
=== Overall ===
Pos.	No.	Driver	Co-driver	Team	Car	Time	Difference	Points
1	2	(Finland) Marcus Grönholm	(Finland) Timo Rautiainen	(France) Peugeot Total	Peugeot 206 WRC	3:07:28.6		10
2	3	(Finland) Harri Rovanperä	(Finland) Risto Pietiläinen	(France) Peugeot Total	Peugeot 206 WRC	3:08:53.1	+1:24.5	6
3	4	(Spain) Carlos Sainz	(Spain) Luis Moya	(United Kingdom) Ford Motor Co. Ltd.	Ford Focus RS WRC '02	3:09:54.4	+2:25.8	4
4	1	(United Kingdom) Richard Burns	(United Kingdom) Robert Reid	(France) Peugeot Total	Peugeot 206 WRC	3:10:02.5	+2:33.9	3
5	8	(United Kingdom) Alister McRae	(United Kingdom) David Senior	(Japan) Marlboro Mitsubishi Ralliart	Mitsubishi Lancer WRC	3:11:43.3	+4:14.7	2
6	5	(United Kingdom) Colin McRae	(United Kingdom) Nicky Grist	(United Kingdom) Ford Motor Co. Ltd.	Ford Focus RS WRC '02	3:11:43.6	+4:15.0	1

=== World Rally Cars ===
==== Classification ====
Position		No.	Driver	Co-driver	Entrant	Car	Time	Difference	Points
Event	Class	No.	Driver	Co-driver	Entrant	Car	Time	Difference	Points
1	1	2	(Finland) Marcus Grönholm	(Finland) Timo Rautiainen	(France) Peugeot Total	Peugeot 206 WRC	3:07:28.6		10
2	2	3	(Finland) Harri Rovanperä	(Finland) Risto Pietiläinen	(France) Peugeot Total	Peugeot 206 WRC	3:08:53.1	+1:24.5	6
3	3	4	(Spain) Carlos Sainz	(Spain) Luis Moya	(United Kingdom) Ford Motor Co. Ltd.	Ford Focus RS WRC '02	3:09:54.4	+2:25.8	4
4	4	1	(United Kingdom) Richard Burns	(United Kingdom) Robert Reid	(France) Peugeot Total	Peugeot 206 WRC	3:10:02.5	+2:33.9	3
5	5	8	(United Kingdom) Alister McRae	(United Kingdom) David Senior	(Japan) Marlboro Mitsubishi Ralliart	Mitsubishi Lancer WRC	3:11:43.3	+4:14.7	2
6	6	5	(United Kingdom) Colin McRae	(United Kingdom) Nicky Grist	(United Kingdom) Ford Motor Co. Ltd.	Ford Focus RS WRC '02	3:11:43.6	+4:15.0	1
8	7	19	(Finland) Juha Kankkunen	(Finland) Juha Repo	(South Korea) Hyundai Castrol World Rally Team	Hyundai Accent WRC2	3:12:05.5	+4:36.9	0
14	8	9	(Finland) Jani Paasonen	(Finland) Arto Kapanen	(Japan) Marlboro Mitsubishi Ralliart	Mitsubishi Lancer WRC	3:15:38.9	+8:10.3	0
15	9	16	(Sweden) Stig Blomqvist	(Venezuela) Ana Goñi	(Czech Republic) Škoda Motorsport	Škoda Octavia WRC Evo2	3:15:43.1	+8:14.5	0
34	10	7	(France) François Delecour	(France) Daniel Grataloup	(Japan) Marlboro Mitsubishi Ralliart	Mitsubishi Lancer WRC	3:32:42.0	+25:13.4	0
Retired SS16		14	(Sweden) Kenneth Eriksson	(Sweden) Tina Thörner	(Czech Republic) Škoda Motorsport	Škoda Octavia WRC Evo2	Engine		0
Retired SS14		17	(Germany) Armin Schwarz	(Germany) Manfred Hiemer	(South Korea) Hyundai Castrol World Rally Team	Hyundai Accent WRC2	Transmission		0
Retired SS14		18	(Belgium) Freddy Loix	(Belgium) Sven Smeets	(South Korea) Hyundai Castrol World Rally Team	Hyundai Accent WRC2	Suspension		0
Retired SS11		15	(Finland) Toni Gardemeister	(Finland) Paavo Lukander	(Czech Republic) Škoda Motorsport	Škoda Octavia WRC Evo2	Accident		0
Retired SS6		11	(Norway) Petter Solberg	(United Kingdom) Phil Mills	(Japan) 555 Subaru World Rally Team	Subaru Impreza S7 WRC '01	Engine		0
Retired SS4		10	(Finland) Tommi Mäkinen	(Finland) Kaj Lindström	(Japan) 555 Subaru World Rally Team	Subaru Impreza S7 WRC '01	Engine		0
Did not start		6	(Estonia) Markko Märtin	(United Kingdom) Michael Park	(United Kingdom) Ford Motor Co. Ltd.	Ford Focus RS WRC '01	Recce accident		0

==== Special stages ====
Day	Stage	Stage name	Length	Winner	Car	Time	Class leaders
Leg 1 (1 Feb)	SS1	Sågen 1	14.17 km	(Finland) Marcus Grönholm	Peugeot 206 WRC	7:32.7	(Finland) Marcus Grönholm
Leg 1 (1 Feb)	SS2	Rämmen 1	23.16 km	(Finland) Harri Rovanperä	Peugeot 206 WRC	12:04.5	(Finland) Marcus Grönholm
Leg 1 (1 Feb)	SS3	Granberget 1	40.51 km	(Finland) Harri Rovanperä	Peugeot 206 WRC	20:50.5	(Finland) Harri Rovanperä
Leg 1 (1 Feb)	SS4	Fredriksberg 1	18.14 km	(Sweden) Thomas Rådström	Citroën Xsara WRC	10:42.6	(Finland) Harri Rovanperä
Leg 1 (1 Feb)	SS5	Lejen 1	28.07 km	(United Kingdom) Colin McRae	Ford Focus RS WRC '02	14:40.4	(Finland) Marcus Grönholm
Leg 2 (2 Feb)	SS6	Granberget 2	40.51 km	(United Kingdom) Colin McRae	Ford Focus RS WRC '02	19:59.7	(Finland) Marcus Grönholm
Leg 2 (2 Feb)	SS7	Fredriksberg 2	18.14 km	(Finland) Marcus Grönholm	Peugeot 206 WRC	10:15.8	(Finland) Marcus Grönholm
Leg 2 (2 Feb)	SS8	Lejen 2	28.07 km	(Finland) Marcus Grönholm	Peugeot 206 WRC	13:58.4	(Finland) Marcus Grönholm
Leg 2 (2 Feb)	SS9	Malta	11.25 km	(Finland) Marcus Grönholm	Peugeot 206 WRC	5:34.9	(Finland) Marcus Grönholm
Leg 2 (2 Feb)	SS10	Hara	11.91 km	(Finland) Marcus Grönholm	Peugeot 206 WRC	5:59.2	(Finland) Marcus Grönholm
Leg 2 (2 Feb)	SS11	Torntorp 1	19.21 km	(Finland) Marcus Grönholm	Peugeot 206 WRC	10:14.8	(Finland) Marcus Grönholm
Leg 3 (3 Feb)	SS12	Sågen 2	14.17 km	(United Kingdom) Richard Burns	Peugeot 206 WRC	7:20.2	(Finland) Marcus Grönholm
Leg 3 (3 Feb)	SS13	Rämmen 2	23.16 km	Stage cancelled			(Finland) Marcus Grönholm
Leg 3 (3 Feb)	SS14	Vargåsen	32.43 km	(United Kingdom) Richard Burns	Peugeot 206 WRC	17:50.1	(Finland) Marcus Grönholm
Leg 3 (3 Feb)	SS15	Torntorp 2	19.21 km	(United Kingdom) Colin McRae	Ford Focus RS WRC '02	9:55.7	(Finland) Marcus Grönholm
Leg 3 (3 Feb)	SS16	Hagfors 2002	39.85 km	(United Kingdom) Richard Burns	Peugeot 206 WRC	19:45.2	(Finland) Marcus Grönholm

==== Championship standings ====
Pos.	Drivers' championships			Co-drivers' championships			Manufacturers' championships		
Pos.	Move	Driver	Points	Move	Co-driver	Points	Move	Manufacturer	Points
1	4	(Finland) Marcus Grönholm	12	4	(Finland) Timo Rautiainen	12	2	(France) Peugeot Total	20
2	1	(Finland) Tommi Mäkinen	10	1	(Finland) Kaj Lindström	10		(United Kingdom) Ford Motor Co. Ltd.	16
3		(Spain) Carlos Sainz	8		(Spain) Luis Moya	8	2	(Japan) 555 Subaru World Rally Team	12
4	2	(France) Sébastien Loeb	6	2	(Monaco) Daniel Elena	6		(Japan) Marlboro Mitsubishi Ralliart	3
5	New entry	(Finland) Harri Rovanperä	6	New entry	(Finland) Risto Pietiläinen	6	New entry	(South Korea) Hyundai Castrol World Rally Team	1

=== Production World Rally Championship ===
==== Classification ====
Position		No.	Driver	Co-driver	Entrant	Car	Time	Difference	Points
Event	Class	No.	Driver	Co-driver	Entrant	Car	Time	Difference	Points
24	1	75	(Finland) Kristian Sohlberg	(Finland) Jukka Aho	Mitsubishi Ralliart Finland	Mitsubishi Lancer Evo VI	3:25:25.9		10
25	2	57	(Japan) Toshihiro Arai	(New Zealand) Tony Sircombe	(Japan) Spike Subaru Team	Subaru Impreza WRX STI	3:25:52.0	+26.1	6
26	3	67	(Finland) Marko Ipatti	(Finland) Kari Kajula	(Finland) RallyRent Europe	Mitsubishi Lancer Evo VI	3:26:24.7	+58.8	4
27	4	53	(Italy) Alessandro Fiorio	(Italy) Enrico Cantoni	(Italy) Ralliart Italia	Mitsubishi Lancer Evo VII	3:27:04.7	+1:38.8	3
31	5	55	(Lithuania) Saulius Girdauskas	(Lithuania) Žilvinas Sakalauskas	(Lithuania) TDS Racing	Mitsubishi Lancer Evo VI	3:31:08.3	+5:42.4	2
38	6	73	(United Kingdom) Martin Rowe	(United Kingdom) Chris Wood	(United Kingdom) David Sutton Cars Ltd	Mitsubishi Lancer Evo VI	3:35:58.4	+10:32.5	1
39	7	66	(Bulgaria) Dimitar Iliev	(Bulgaria) Petar Sivov	(Italy) Mauro Rally Tuning	Mitsubishi Lancer Evo VII	3:37:00.7	+11:34.8	0
40	8	69	(Norway) Bernt Kollevold	(Norway) Olav Bodilsen	(Norway) Kollevold Rally Team	Mitsubishi Lancer Evo VI	3:37:15.6	+11:49.7	0
44	9	72	(Sweden) Joakim Roman	(Sweden) Ingrid Mitakidou	(Sweden) Milbrooks World Rally Team	Mitsubishi Lancer Evo V	3:39:51.8	+14:25.9	0
47	10	60	(United Kingdom) Ben Briant	(United Kingdom) Jayson Brown	(United Kingdom) Mitsubishi Ralliart UK	Mitsubishi Lancer Evo VI	3:45:39.0	+20:13.1	0
51	11	59	(United Kingdom) Natalie Barratt	(United Kingdom) Roger Freeman	(United Kingdom) Natalie Barratt Rallysport	Mitsubishi Lancer Evo VI	3:53:27.3	+28:01.4	0
Retired SS11		51	(Uruguay) Gustavo Trelles	(Argentina) Jorge Del Buono	(Italy) Mauro Rally Tuning	Mitsubishi Lancer Evo VI	Accident		0
Retired SS2		76	(Czech Republic) Pavel Valoušek	(Italy) Pierangelo Scalvini	(Italy) Jolly Club	Mitsubishi Lancer Evo VI	Engine		0
Retired SS1		62	(Italy) Norberto Cangani	(Italy) Eros di Prima	(Italy) Top Run SRL	Mitsubishi Lancer Evo VI	Engine		0

==== Special stages ====
Day	Stage	Stage name	Length	Winner	Car	Time	Class leaders
Leg 1 (1 Feb)	SS1	Sågen 1	14.17 km	(Japan) Toshihiro Arai	Subaru Impreza WRX STI	8:23.0	(Japan) Toshihiro Arai
Leg 1 (1 Feb)	SS2	Rämmen 1	23.16 km	(Finland) Kristian Sohlberg	Mitsubishi Lancer Evo VI	13:02.8	(Finland) Kristian Sohlberg
Leg 1 (1 Feb)	SS3	Granberget 1	40.51 km	(Finland) Kristian Sohlberg	Mitsubishi Lancer Evo VI	22:29.7	(Finland) Kristian Sohlberg
Leg 1 (1 Feb)	SS4	Fredriksberg 1	18.14 km	(Finland) Kristian Sohlberg	Mitsubishi Lancer Evo VI	11:30.9	(Finland) Kristian Sohlberg
Leg 1 (1 Feb)	SS5	Lejen 1	28.07 km	(Italy) Alessandro Fiorio	Mitsubishi Lancer Evo VII	16:02.9	(Finland) Kristian Sohlberg
Leg 2 (2 Feb)	SS6	Granberget 2	40.51 km	(Finland) Kristian Sohlberg	Mitsubishi Lancer Evo VI	21:55.5	(Finland) Kristian Sohlberg
Leg 2 (2 Feb)	SS7	Fredriksberg 2	18.14 km	(Finland) Kristian Sohlberg	Mitsubishi Lancer Evo VI	11:07.9	(Finland) Kristian Sohlberg
Leg 2 (2 Feb)	SS8	Lejen 2	28.07 km	(Italy) Alessandro Fiorio	Mitsubishi Lancer Evo VII	15:25.1	(Finland) Kristian Sohlberg
Leg 2 (2 Feb)	SS9	Malta	11.25 km	(Uruguay) Gustavo Trelles (Finland) Marko Ipatti	Mitsubishi Lancer Evo VI; Mitsubishi Lancer Evo VI	6:17.3	(Finland) Kristian Sohlberg
Leg 2 (2 Feb)	SS10	Hara	11.91 km	(Finland) Marko Ipatti	Mitsubishi Lancer Evo VI	6:41.2	(Finland) Kristian Sohlberg
Leg 2 (2 Feb)	SS11	Torntorp 1	19.21 km	(Finland) Marko Ipatti	Mitsubishi Lancer Evo VI	11:27.7	(Finland) Kristian Sohlberg
Leg 3 (3 Feb)	SS12	Sågen 2	14.17 km	(Finland) Marko Ipatti	Mitsubishi Lancer Evo VI	8:06.8	(Finland) Kristian Sohlberg
Leg 3 (3 Feb)	SS13	Rämmen 2	23.16 km	Stage cancelled			(Finland) Kristian Sohlberg
Leg 3 (3 Feb)	SS14	Vargåsen	32.43 km	(Finland) Kristian Sohlberg	Mitsubishi Lancer Evo VI	19:15.1	(Finland) Kristian Sohlberg
Leg 3 (3 Feb)	SS15	Torntorp 2	19.21 km	(Finland) Marko Ipatti	Mitsubishi Lancer Evo VI	10:50.3	(Finland) Kristian Sohlberg
Leg 3 (3 Feb)	SS16	Hagfors 2002	39.85 km	(Finland) Marko Ipatti	Mitsubishi Lancer Evo VI	21:39.9	(Finland) Kristian Sohlberg

==== Championship standings ====
Pos.	Drivers' championships		
Pos.	Move	Driver	Points
1	New entry	(Finland) Kristian Sohlberg	10
2	New entry	(Japan) Toshihiro Arai	6
3	New entry	(Finland) Marko Ipatti	4
4	New entry	(Italy) Alessandro Fiorio	3
5	New entry	(Lithuania) Saulius Girdauskas	2
