= Daniel Carlsson (rally driver) =

Swedish rally driver (born 1976)

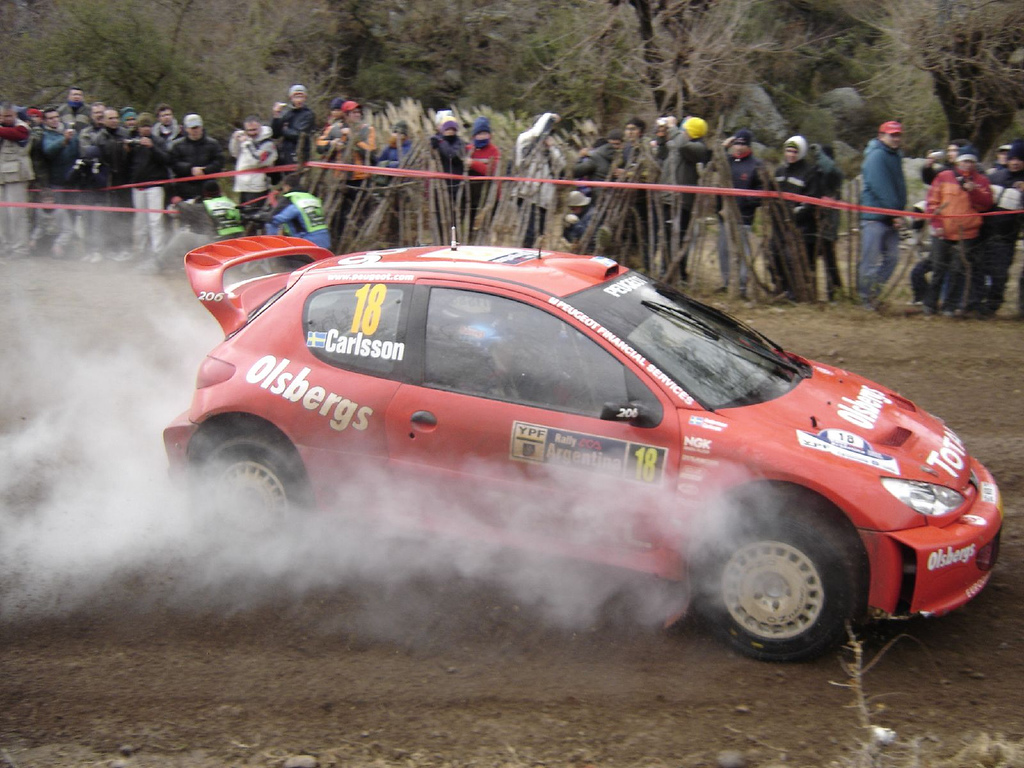
- Carlsson driving a Peugeot 206 WRC at the 2005 Rally Argentina

Personal information
- Nationality: (Sweden) Swedish
- Born: 29 June 1976 (age 50); Säffle, Sweden

World Rally Championship record
- Years active: 1999–2007
- Co-driver: (Sweden) Kent-Åke Stenbäck (Sweden) Benny Melander (Sweden) Per Karlsson (Sweden) Mattias Andersson (Sweden) Bosse Holmstrand (Sweden) Tomas Thorszelius (France) Denis Giraudet
- Teams: Peugeot, Bozian Racing, OMV Kronos Citroën
- Rallies: 43
- Championships: 0
- Rally wins: 0
- Podiums: 1
- Stage wins: 2
- Total points: 26
- First rally: 1999 Swedish Rally
- Last rally: 2007 Rally di Sardegna

Daniel Carlsson (born 29 June 1976) is a rally car driver from Sweden.

== Biography ==
Carlsson came in second at the Swedish Junior Rally Championship in 1998 when he was only 22. He went on to compete in the Swedish Rally Championship in 1999, finishing first in Group H. In 1999, he finished second again in the Swedish Juniors.

By 2000, Carlsson graduated to the WRC and finished 22nd at his home rally of Sweden driving a Toyota. The following year in the same event, he finished seventh.

At his first Monte Carlo rally in 2002, Carlsson promptly came in fourth just off the podium driving a Ford Puma S1600. At his home rally of Sweden, driving a Mitsubishi in the group N class, he finished first.

In the 2005 WRC season, Carlsson was asked to stand in for Markko Märtin after the Wales Rally GB, in which Märtin's co-driver was killed. Martin decided to quit for the rest of the season, therefore prompting Peugeot Sport team to hire Carlsson for the remainder of the season.

At the start of the 2006 season, Carlsson posted his best home result with a third in the Swedish WRC Rally. For the 2006 season Carlsson drove a Mitsubishi Lancer Evolution with co-driver Bo Holmstrand.

In 2007, Carlsson was caught for drunk driving, had his driving license revoked, and decided to quit his rally career.

== WRC results ==
Year	Entrant	Car	1	2	3	4	5	6	7	8	9	10	11	12	13	14	15	16	WDC	Points
1999	Daniel Carlsson	Opel Astra GSi 16v	MON	SWE; 40	KEN	POR	ESP	FRA	ARG	GRE	NZL								NC	0
1999	Daniel Carlsson	Mitsubishi Lancer Evo										FIN; Ret	CHN	ITA	AUS	GBR			NC	0
2000	Daniel Carlsson	Toyota Corolla WRC	MON	SWE; 23	KEN	POR	ESP	ARG	GRE	NZL	FIN	CYP	FRA	ITA	AUS	GBR			NC	0
2001	Daniel Carlsson	Toyota Corolla WRC	MON	SWE; 7	POR; Ret	ESP	ARG	CYP	GRE	KEN	FIN; Ret	NZL	ITA; Ret	FRA	AUS	GBR			NC	0
2002	Daniel Carlsson	Ford Puma S1600	MON; 20		FRA	ESP; Ret	CYP	ARG	GRE; Ret	KEN		GER; Ret	ITA; Ret	NZL	AUS	GBR; Ret			NC	0
2002	Daniel Carlsson	Mitsubishi Lancer Evo VII		SWE; 20							FIN; Ret								NC	0
2003	Daniel Carlsson	Suzuki Ignis S1600	MON; EX	SWE	TUR; Ret	NZL	ARG	GRE; 18	CYP	GER	FIN; 19	AUS	ITA; Ret	FRA	ESP; 22	GBR; 14			NC	0
2004	Bozian Racing	Peugeot 206 WRC	MON	SWE; 8	MEX	NZL; 8	CYP	GRE; 5	TUR; Ret	ARG	FIN; 9	GER; Ret	JPN			FRA; 11	ESP	AUS	12th	6
2004	Marlboro Peugeot Total	Peugeot 307 WRC												GBR; Ret	ITA				12th	6
2005	Bozian Racing	Peugeot 307 WRC	MON	SWE; 6	MEX	NZL													19th	5
2005	Rally Team Olsbergs	Subaru Impreza WRC 04					ITA; Ret		TUR; Ret	GRE; 14									19th	5
2005	Bozian Racing	Peugeot 206 WRC						CYP; 8			ARG; 15	FIN	GER	GBR					19th	5
2005	Marlboro Peugeot Total	Peugeot 307 WRC													JPN; 8	FRA	ESP	AUS; Ret	19th	5
2006	Daniel Carlsson	Mitsubishi Lancer WRC 05	MON	SWE; 3	MEX	ESP	FRA	ARG	ITA	GRE	GER	FIN; Ret	JPN	CYP	TUR	AUS	NZL	GBR	16th	6
2007	Kronos Citroën World Rally Team	Citroën Xsara WRC	MON	SWE; 5	NOR; 7	MEX	POR; 6	ARG	ITA; Ret	GRE	FIN	GER	NZL	ESP	FRA	JPN	IRE	GBR	14th	9

=== JWRC results ===
Year	Entrant	Car	1	2	3	4	5	6	7	JWRC	Points
2002	Daniel Carlsson	Ford Puma S1600	MON; 4	ESP; Ret	GRE; Ret	GER; Ret	ITA; Ret	GBR; Ret		12th	3
2003	Daniel Carlsson	Suzuki Ignis S1600	MON; EX	TUR; Ret	GRE; 2	FIN; 1	ITA; Ret	ESP; 4	GBR; 1	3rd	33
