= 2000 Swedish Rally =

2nd round of the 2000 World Rally Championship

2000 Swedish Rally 49th International Swedish Rally
Round 2 of the 2000 World Rally Championship season
← Previous event	Next event →
- Host country: Sweden
- Rally base: Karlstad
- Dates run: February 11, 2000 – February 13, 2000
- Stages: 20 (378.41 km; 235.13 miles)
- Stage surface: Snow/ice
- Overall distance: 1,708.40 km (1,061.55 miles)

Statistics
- Crews: 78 at start, 54 at finish

Overall results
- Overall winner: (Finland) Marcus Grönholm (Finland) Timo Rautiainen (France) Peugeot Esso; Peugeot 206 WRC

The 2000 Swedish Rally (formally the 49th International Swedish Rally) was the second round of the 2000 World Rally Championship. The race was held over three days between 11 February and 13 February 2000, and was won by Peugeot's Marcus Grönholm, his 1st win in the World Rally Championship.

== Background ==
=== Entry list ===
No.	Driver	Co-Driver	Entrant	Car	Tyre
World Rally Championship manufacturer entries
1	(Finland) Tommi Mäkinen	(Finland) Risto Mannisenmäki	(Japan) Marlboro Mitsubishi Ralliart	Mitsubishi Lancer Evo VI	MI
2	(Belgium) Freddy Loix	(Belgium) Sven Smeets	(Japan) Marlboro Mitsubishi Ralliart	Mitsubishi Carisma GT Evo VI	MI
3	(United Kingdom) Richard Burns	(United Kingdom) Robert Reid	(Japan) Subaru World Rally Team	Subaru Impreza S5 WRC '99	P
4	(Finland) Juha Kankkunen	(Finland) Juha Repo	(Japan) Subaru World Rally Team	Subaru Impreza S5 WRC '99	P
5	(United Kingdom) Colin McRae	(United Kingdom) Nicky Grist	(United Kingdom) Ford Motor Co. Ltd.	Ford Focus RS WRC '00	MI
6	(Spain) Carlos Sainz	(Spain) Luis Moya	(United Kingdom) Ford Motor Co. Ltd.	Ford Focus RS WRC '00	MI
7	(France) Didier Auriol	(France) Denis Giraudet	(Spain) SEAT Sport	SEAT Córdoba WRC Evo2	P
8	(Finland) Toni Gardemeister	(Finland) Paavo Lukander	(Spain) SEAT Sport	SEAT Córdoba WRC Evo2	P
9	(France) François Delecour	(France) Daniel Grataloup	(France) Peugeot Esso	Peugeot 206 WRC	MI
10	(Finland) Marcus Grönholm	(Finland) Timo Rautiainen	(France) Peugeot Esso	Peugeot 206 WRC	MI
14	(Sweden) Kenneth Eriksson	(Sweden) Staffan Parmander	(South Korea) Hyundai Castrol World Rally Team	Hyundai Accent WRC	MI
15	(United Kingdom) Alister McRae	(United Kingdom) David Senior	(South Korea) Hyundai Castrol World Rally Team	Hyundai Accent WRC	MI
World Rally Championship entries
16	(Finland) Harri Rovanperä	(Finland) Risto Pietiläinen	(Spain) SEAT Sport	SEAT Córdoba WRC Evo2	P
17	(Sweden) Thomas Rådström	(Sweden) Tina Thörner	Toyota Team Sweden	Toyota Corolla WRC	MI
18	(Estonia) Markko Märtin	(United Kingdom) Michael Park	(Estonia) Lukoil EOS Rally Team	Toyota Corolla WRC	—N/a
19	(Finland) Pasi Hagström	(Finland) Tero Gardemeister	(Finland) Pasi Hagström	Toyota Corolla WRC	MI
20	(Sweden) Mats Jonsson	(Sweden) Johnny Johansson	(Sweden) Mats Jonsson	Ford Escort WRC	—N/a
21	(Norway) Henning Solberg	(Norway) Runar Pedersen	(Norway) Henning Solberg	Ford Escort WRC	—N/a
22	(Poland) Krzysztof Hołowczyc	(Belgium) Jean-Marc Fortin	(Poland) Wizja TV / Turning Point RT	Subaru Impreza S5 WRC '99	MI
23	(Finland) Janne Tuohino	(Finland) Miikka Anttila	(Finland) Janne Tuohino	Toyota Corolla WRC	—N/a
31	(Saudi Arabia) Abdullah Bakhashab	(United Kingdom) Bobby Willis	Toyota Team Saudi Arabia	Toyota Corolla WRC	MI
37	(Sweden) Daniel Carlsson	(Sweden) Benny Melander	(Sweden) Daniel Carlsson	Toyota Corolla WRC	—N/a
38	(Poland) Tomasz Kuchar	(Poland) Maciej Szczepaniak	(Poland) Tomasz Kuchar	Toyota Celica GT-Four (ST205)	MI
48	(Greece) Ioannis Papadimitriou	(Greece) Nikolaos Petropoulos	(Greece) Ioannis Papadimitriou	Subaru Impreza 555	—N/a
63	(United Kingdom) Geoff Smith	(United Kingdom) Chris Jones	(United Kingdom) Geoff Smith	Ford Escort WRC	—N/a
Group N Cup entries
25	(Sweden) Stig-Olov Walfridsson	(Sweden) Lars Bäckman	(Sweden) Stig-Olov Walfridsson	Mitsubishi Lancer Evo VI	—N/a
26	(Sweden) Kenneth Bäcklund	(Sweden) Tord Andersson	(Sweden) Kenneth Bäcklund	Mitsubishi Lancer Evo VI	—N/a
27	(Finland) Jani Paasonen	(Finland) Jakke Honkanen	(Finland) Jani Paasonen	Mitsubishi Carisma GT Evo VI	—N/a
28	(Finland) Juuso Pykälistö	(Finland) Esko Mertsalmi	Mitsubishi Ralliart Finland	Mitsubishi Carisma GT Evo VI	—N/a
30	(Austria) Manfred Stohl	(Austria) Peter Müller	(Austria) Manfred Stohl	Mitsubishi Lancer Evo VI	—N/a
34	(Sweden) Pernilla Walfridsson-Solberg	(Sweden) Ulrika Mattsson	(Sweden) Pernilla Walfridsson-Solberg	Mitsubishi Lancer Evo VI	—N/a
39	(Sweden) Mats Karlsson	(Sweden) Anders Martinsson	(Sweden) Mats Karlsson	Mitsubishi Lancer Evo III	—N/a
40	(Sweden) Kristoffer Nilsson	(Sweden) Per Andersson	(Sweden) Kristoffer Nilsson	Subaru Impreza WRX STI RA	—N/a
42	(Sweden) Mattias Ekström	(Sweden) Stefan Bergman	(Sweden) Mattias Ekström	Mitsubishi Lancer Evo IV	—N/a
45	(Italy) Gianluigi Galli	(Italy) Nicola Arena	(Italy) Vieffe Corse SRL	Mitsubishi Lancer Evo V	—N/a
46	(Sweden) Kenneth Johansson	(Sweden) Gunnar Barth	(Sweden) Kenneth Johansson	Mitsubishi Lancer Evo III	—N/a
49	(Finland) Hannu Hotanen	(Finland) Jari Jyrkiäinen	(Finland) Hannu Hotanen	Mitsubishi Lancer Evo VI	—N/a
50	(Finland) Jussi Välimäki	(Finland) Jarkko Kalliolepo	(Finland) Jussi Välimäki	Mitsubishi Lancer Evo VI	—N/a
54	(United Kingdom) Richard Tuthill	(Sweden) Åke Gustavsson	(United Kingdom) Richard Tuthill	Subaru Impreza	—N/a
55	(Russia) Stanislav Gryazin	(Russia) Dmitriy Eremeev	(Russia) Stanislav Gryazin	Mitsubishi Lancer Evo VI	—N/a
56	(Italy) Marco Menegatto	(Italy) Roberto Vittori	(Italy) Marco Menegatto	Mitsubishi Lancer Evo VI	—N/a
57	(Spain) Ignacio Sanfilippo	(Spain) José Vicente Medina	(Spain) Ignacio Sanfilippo	Mitsubishi Carisma GT Evo VI	—N/a
58	(Belgium) Joost Boxoen	(Belgium) Bram Bourgeois	(Belgium) Joost Boxoen	Mitsubishi Lancer Evo V	—N/a
59	(Sweden) Joakim Roman	(Sweden) Thomas Fredriksson	(Sweden) Joakim Roman	Mitsubishi Lancer Evo V	—N/a
61	(Sweden) Jerry Åhlin	(Sweden) Stefan Simonsson	(Sweden) Jerry Åhlin	Mitsubishi Lancer Evo V	—N/a
62	(Belgium) Bob Colsoul	(Belgium) Tom Colsoul	(Belgium) Bob Colsoul	Mitsubishi Lancer Evo IV	—N/a
69	(Sweden) Joachim Nilsson	(Sweden) Matthias Olofsson	(Sweden) Joachim Nilsson	Opel Astra GSi 16V	—N/a
70	(Sweden) Mikael Stattin	(Sweden) Patrik Dybeck	(Sweden) Mikael Stattin	SEAT Ibiza GTi 16V	—N/a
71	(Sweden) Johan Jonsson	(Sweden) Mikael Persson	(Sweden) Johan Jonsson	Citroën Xsara VTS	—N/a
73	(Sweden) Anders Wänn	(Sweden) Mikael Eriksson	(Sweden) Anders Wänn	Peugeot 106 S16	—N/a
74	(Sweden) Anders Grundström	(Sweden) Lars-Ola Nordqvist	(Sweden) Anders Grundström	Mitsubishi Lancer Evo V	—N/a
75	(Sweden) Magnus Jansson	(Sweden) Thomas Fredriksson	(Sweden) Magnus Jansson	Mitsubishi Lancer Evo IV	—N/a
76	(United Kingdom) Julian Reynolds	(United Kingdom) Andrew Bull	(United Kingdom) Julian Reynolds	Mitsubishi Lancer Evo IV	—N/a
77	(United Kingdom) Natalie Barratt	(United Kingdom) Elin Wolland	(United Kingdom) Natalie Barratt	Mitsubishi Lancer Evo VI	—N/a
78	(Italy) Alfredo De Dominicis	(Italy) Alessandro Mari	(Italy) Alfredo De Dominicis	Mitsubishi Lancer Evo V	—N/a
79	(United Kingdom) Vincent Bristow	(Sweden) Mikael Johansson	(United Kingdom) Vincent Bristow	Mazda 323 GTX	—N/a
81	(Germany) Andreas Mansfeld	(Netherlands) Marc de Jong	(Germany) Andreas Mansfeld	Honda Integra Type-R DC2	—N/a
82	(Sweden) Peter Hillebjörk	(Sweden) Roger Hillebjörk	(Sweden) Peter Hillebjörk	Renault Mégane Coupé 16v	—N/a
83	(Sweden) Lars Johansson	(Sweden) Magnus Lörd	(Sweden) Lars Johansson	Opel Astra GSi 16V	—N/a
84	(Sweden) Johan Palola	(Sweden) Helena Eriksson	(Sweden) Johan Palola	SEAT Ibiza GTi 16V	—N/a
85	(Sweden) Anders Florén	(Sweden) Curt Rosén	(Sweden) Anders Florén	Volkswagen Golf GTI 16V	—N/a
86	(Norway) Nils Tronrud	(Norway) Gunhild Hvaal Engh	(Norway) Nils Tronrud	Nissan Almera Kit Car	—N/a
87	(Sweden) Stanley Dickens	(Sweden) Lars Rosen	(Sweden) Stanley Dickens	SEAT Ibiza GTi 16V	—N/a
88	(Sweden) Bengt Karlsson	(Sweden) Tony Puumala	(Sweden) Bengt Karlsson	SEAT Ibiza GTi 16V	—N/a
90	(France) Patrick Legros	(France) Frédéric Agnelli	(France) Patrick Legros	Honda Integra Type-R	—N/a
91	(Sweden) Lasse Storm	(Sweden) Ulf Storm	(Sweden) Lasse Storm	Citroën AX GTI	—N/a
92	(Sweden) Lars-Erik Kronberg	(Sweden) Thomas Nilsson	(Sweden) Lars-Erik Kronberg	Suzuki Swift GTi	—N/a
94	(France) Jacques Gleizes	(France) Jeanine Porterat-Gleizes	(France) Jacques Gleizes	Citroën AX GTI	—N/a
95	(Portugal) António Pinto dos Santos	(Portugal) Nuno Rodrigues da Silva	(Portugal) António Pinto dos Santos	Renault 4 GTL	—N/a

=== Itinerary ===
All dates and times are CET (UTC+1).

Date	Time	No.	Stage name	Distance
Leg 1 — 129.29 km
11 February	08:14	SS1	Sågen 1	14.76 km
11 February	09:10	SS2	Rämmen 1	23.44 km
11 February	10:47	SS3	Hamra	28.59 km
11 February	11:50	SS4	Torsby	2.79 km
11 February	12:55	SS5	Bjälverud	21.58 km
11 February	13:45	SS6	Mangen	13.29 km
11 February	14:00	SS7	Arvika	2.00 km
11 February	16:00	SS8	Långjohanstorp	19.44 km
11 February	17:09	SS9	I2	3.40 km
Leg 2 — 153.21 km
12 February	07:11	SS10	Fredriksberg	27.39 km
12 February	10:17	SS11	Nyhammar	27.79 km
12 February	11:29	SS12	Skog 1	24.19 km
12 February	13:26	SS13	Jutbo	47.65 km
12 February	15:32	SS14	Skog 2	24.19 km
12 February	16:31	SS15	Lugnet	2.00 km
Leg 3 — 95.91 km
13 February	08:57	SS16	Malta	11.88 km
13 February	09:43	SS17	Ullen	24.62 km
13 February	11:25	SS18	Sågen 2	14.76 km
13 February	12:18	SS19	Rämmen 2	23.44 km
13 February	14:00	SS20	Hagfors	21.21 km

== Results ==
=== Overall ===
Pos.	No.	Driver	Co-driver	Team	Car	Time	Difference	Points
1	10	(Finland) Marcus Grönholm	(Finland) Timo Rautiainen	(France) Peugeot Esso	Peugeot 206 WRC	3:20:33.3		10
2	1	(Finland) Tommi Mäkinen	(Finland) Risto Mannisenmäki	(Japan) Marlboro Mitsubishi Ralliart	Mitsubishi Lancer Evo VI	3:20:40.1	+6.8	6
3	5	(United Kingdom) Colin McRae	(United Kingdom) Nicky Grist	(United Kingdom) Ford Motor Co. Ltd.	Ford Focus RS WRC '00	3:20:47.0	+13.7	4
4	17	(Sweden) Thomas Rådström	(Sweden) Tina Thörner	Toyota Team Sweden	Toyota Corolla WRC	3:20:48.2	+14.9	3
5	3	(United Kingdom) Richard Burns	(United Kingdom) Robert Reid	(Japan) Subaru World Rally Team	Subaru Impreza S5 WRC '99	3:21:08.3	+35.0	2
6	4	(Finland) Juha Kankkunen	(Finland) Juha Repo	(Japan) Subaru World Rally Team	Subaru Impreza S5 WRC '99	3:23:20.9	+2:47.6	1

=== World Rally Cars ===
==== Classification ====
Position		No.	Driver	Co-driver	Entrant	Car	Time	Difference	Points
Event	Class	No.	Driver	Co-driver	Entrant	Car	Time	Difference	Points
1	1	10	(Finland) Marcus Grönholm	(Finland) Timo Rautiainen	(France) Peugeot Esso	Peugeot 206 WRC	3:20:33.3		10
2	2	1	(Finland) Tommi Mäkinen	(Finland) Risto Mannisenmäki	(Japan) Marlboro Mitsubishi Ralliart	Mitsubishi Lancer Evo VI	3:20:40.1	+6.8	6
3	3	5	(United Kingdom) Colin McRae	(United Kingdom) Nicky Grist	(United Kingdom) Ford Motor Co. Ltd.	Ford Focus RS WRC '00	3:20:47.0	+13.7	4
5	4	3	(United Kingdom) Richard Burns	(United Kingdom) Robert Reid	(Japan) Subaru World Rally Team	Subaru Impreza S5 WRC '99	3:21:08.3	+35.0	2
6	5	4	(Finland) Juha Kankkunen	(Finland) Juha Repo	(Japan) Subaru World Rally Team	Subaru Impreza S5 WRC '99	3:23:20.9	+2:47.6	1
7	6	9	(France) François Delecour	(France) Daniel Grataloup	(France) Peugeot Esso	Peugeot 206 WRC	3:25:05.2	+4:31.9	0
8	7	2	(Belgium) Freddy Loix	(Belgium) Sven Smeets	(Japan) Marlboro Mitsubishi Ralliart	Mitsubishi Carisma GT Evo VI	3:25:41.6	+5:08.3	0
10	8	7	(France) Didier Auriol	(France) Denis Giraudet	(Spain) SEAT Sport	SEAT Córdoba WRC Evo2	3:25:49.2	+5:15.9	0
13	9	14	(Sweden) Kenneth Eriksson	(Sweden) Staffan Parmander	(South Korea) Hyundai Castrol World Rally Team	Hyundai Accent WRC	3:29:17.2	+8:43.9	0
14	10	15	(United Kingdom) Alister McRae	(United Kingdom) David Senior	(South Korea) Hyundai Castrol World Rally Team	Hyundai Accent WRC	3:29:27.5	+8:54.2	0
Retired SS11		6	(Spain) Carlos Sainz	(Spain) Luis Moya	(United Kingdom) Ford Motor Co. Ltd.	Ford Focus RS WRC '00	Fuel pump		0
Retired SS11		8	(Finland) Toni Gardemeister	(Finland) Paavo Lukander	(Spain) SEAT Sport	SEAT Córdoba WRC Evo2	Oil pressure		0

==== Special stages ====
Day	Stage	Stage name	Length	Winner	Car	Time	Class leaders
Leg 1 (11 Feb)	SS1	Sågen 1	14.76 km	(Sweden) Thomas Rådström	Toyota Corolla WRC	7:57.7	(Sweden) Thomas Rådström
Leg 1 (11 Feb)	SS2	Rämmen 1	23.44 km	(Finland) Marcus Grönholm	Peugeot 206 WRC	12:10.3	(Finland) Marcus Grönholm
Leg 1 (11 Feb)	SS3	Hamra	28.59 km	(United Kingdom) Richard Burns	Subaru Impreza S5 WRC '99	15:03.1	(Finland) Marcus Grönholm
Leg 1 (11 Feb)	SS4	Torsby	2.79 km	(Finland) Tommi Mäkinen	Mitsubishi Lancer Evo VI	2:05.9	(Finland) Marcus Grönholm
Leg 1 (11 Feb)	SS5	Bjälverud	21.58 km	(Finland) Marcus Grönholm	Peugeot 206 WRC	10:43.1	(Finland) Marcus Grönholm
Leg 1 (11 Feb)	SS6	Mangen	13.29 km	(Finland) Marcus Grönholm	Peugeot 206 WRC	6:51.8	(Finland) Marcus Grönholm
Leg 1 (11 Feb)	SS7	Arvika	2.00 km	Stage cancelled			(Finland) Marcus Grönholm
Leg 1 (11 Feb)	SS8	Långjohanstorp	19.44 km	(Finland) Marcus Grönholm	Peugeot 206 WRC	9:29.3	(Finland) Marcus Grönholm
Leg 1 (11 Feb)	SS9	I2	3.40 km	(United Kingdom) Colin McRae	Ford Focus RS WRC '00	1:55.9	(Finland) Marcus Grönholm
Leg 2 (12 Feb)	SS10	Fredriksberg	27.39 km	(Finland) Marcus Grönholm	Peugeot 206 WRC	15:43.0	(Finland) Marcus Grönholm
Leg 2 (12 Feb)	SS11	Nyhammar	27.79 km	(Finland) Marcus Grönholm	Peugeot 206 WRC	14:34.7	(Finland) Marcus Grönholm
Leg 2 (12 Feb)	SS12	Skog 1	24.19 km	(United Kingdom) Colin McRae	Ford Focus RS WRC '00	12:49.6	(Finland) Marcus Grönholm
Leg 2 (12 Feb)	SS13	Jutbo	47.65 km	(United Kingdom) Colin McRae	Ford Focus RS WRC '00	26:30.9	(Finland) Marcus Grönholm
Leg 2 (12 Feb)	SS14	Skog 2	24.19 km	(Finland) Marcus Grönholm	Peugeot 206 WRC	12:53.7	(Finland) Marcus Grönholm
Leg 2 (12 Feb)	SS15	Lugnet	2.00 km	(Finland) Tommi Mäkinen	Mitsubishi Lancer Evo VI	1:53.8	(Finland) Marcus Grönholm
Leg 3 (13 Feb)	SS16	Malta	11.88 km	(Sweden) Thomas Rådström	Toyota Corolla WRC	5:44.3	(Finland) Marcus Grönholm
Leg 3 (13 Feb)	SS17	Ullen	24.62 km	(United Kingdom) Richard Burns	Subaru Impreza S5 WRC '99	12:05.4	(Finland) Marcus Grönholm
Leg 3 (13 Feb)	SS18	Sågen 2	14.76 km	(Sweden) Thomas Rådström	Toyota Corolla WRC	7:45.9	(Finland) Marcus Grönholm
Leg 3 (13 Feb)	SS19	Rämmen 2	23.44 km	(Sweden) Thomas Rådström	Toyota Corolla WRC	11:52.8	(Finland) Marcus Grönholm
Leg 3 (13 Feb)	SS20	Hagfors	21.21 km	(United Kingdom) Colin McRae	Ford Focus RS WRC '00	11:22.9	(Finland) Marcus Grönholm

==== Championship standings ====
Pos.	Drivers' championships			Co-drivers' championships			Manufacturers' championships		
Pos.	Move	Driver	Points	Move	Co-driver	Points	Move	Manufacturer	Points
1		(Finland) Tommi Mäkinen	16		(Finland) Risto Mannisenmäki	16		(Japan) Marlboro Mitsubishi Ralliart	18
2	New entry	(Finland) Marcus Grönholm	10	New entry	(Finland) Timo Rautiainen	10	New entry	(France) Peugeot Esso	11
3	1	(Spain) Carlos Sainz	6	1	(Spain) Luis Moya	6	1	(United Kingdom) Ford Motor Co. Ltd.	10
4	1	(Finland) Juha Kankkunen	5	1	(Finland) Juha Repo	5	1	(Japan) Subaru World Rally Team	9
5	New entry	(United Kingdom) Colin McRae	4	New entry	(United Kingdom) Nicky Grist	4	1	(Spain) SEAT Sport	3

=== FIA Cup for Production Rally Drivers ===
==== Classification ====
Position		No.	Driver	Co-driver	Entrant	Car	Time	Difference	Points
Event	Class	No.	Driver	Co-driver	Entrant	Car	Time	Difference	Points
17	1	27	(Finland) Jani Paasonen	(Finland) Jakke Honkanen	(Finland) Jani Paasonen	Mitsubishi Carisma GT Evo VI	3:36:02.1		10
18	2	28	(Finland) Juuso Pykälistö	(Finland) Esko Mertsalmi	Mitsubishi Ralliart Finland	Mitsubishi Carisma GT Evo VI	3:36:33.5	+31.4	6
19	3	25	(Sweden) Stig-Olov Walfridsson	(Sweden) Lars Bäckman	(Sweden) Stig-Olov Walfridsson	Mitsubishi Lancer Evo VI	3:37:22.1	+1:20.0	4
20	4	30	(Austria) Manfred Stohl	(Austria) Peter Müller	(Austria) Manfred Stohl	Mitsubishi Lancer Evo VI	3:38:58.0	+2:55.9	3
21	5	42	(Sweden) Mattias Ekström	(Sweden) Stefan Bergman	(Sweden) Mattias Ekström	Mitsubishi Lancer Evo IV	3:39:02.7	+3:00.6	2
22	6	26	(Sweden) Kenneth Bäcklund	(Sweden) Tord Andersson	(Sweden) Kenneth Bäcklund	Mitsubishi Lancer Evo VI	3:39:10.4	+3:08.3	1
24	7	34	(Sweden) Pernilla Walfridsson-Solberg	(Sweden) Ulrika Mattsson	(Sweden) Pernilla Walfridsson-Solberg	Mitsubishi Lancer Evo VI	3:40:54.7	+4:52.6	0
26	8	45	(Italy) Gianluigi Galli	(Italy) Nicola Arena	(Italy) Vieffe Corse SRL	Mitsubishi Lancer Evo V	3:41:06.2	+5:04.1	0
29	9	46	(Sweden) Kenneth Johansson	(Sweden) Gunnar Barth	(Sweden) Kenneth Johansson	Mitsubishi Lancer Evo III	3:45:25.3	+9:23.2	0
30	10	50	(Finland) Jussi Välimäki	(Finland) Jarkko Kalliolepo	(Finland) Jussi Välimäki	Mitsubishi Lancer Evo VI	3:48:32.7	+12:30.6	0
32	11	54	(United Kingdom) Richard Tuthill	(Sweden) Åke Gustavsson	(United Kingdom) Richard Tuthill	Subaru Impreza	3:49:11.6	+13:09.5	0
35	12	49	(Finland) Hannu Hotanen	(Finland) Jari Jyrkiäinen	(Finland) Hannu Hotanen	Mitsubishi Lancer Evo VI	3:59:23.7	+23:21.6	0
36	13	55	(Russia) Stanislav Gryazin	(Russia) Dmitriy Eremeev	(Russia) Stanislav Gryazin	Mitsubishi Lancer Evo VI	4:00:53.4	+24:51.3	0
38	14	57	(Spain) Ignacio Sanfilippo	(Spain) José Vicente Medina	(Spain) Ignacio Sanfilippo	Mitsubishi Carisma GT Evo VI	4:04:55.4	+28:53.3	0
39	15	62	(Belgium) Bob Colsoul	(Belgium) Tom Colsoul	(Belgium) Bob Colsoul	Mitsubishi Lancer Evo IV	4:05:00.5	+28:58.4	0
40	16	56	(Italy) Marco Menegatto	(Italy) Roberto Vittori	(Italy) Marco Menegatto	Mitsubishi Lancer Evo VI	4:06:40.2	+30:38.1	0
41	17	79	(United Kingdom) Vincent Bristow	(Sweden) Mikael Johansson	(United Kingdom) Vincent Bristow	Mazda 323 GTX	4:12:01.6	+35:59.5	0
42	18	59	(Sweden) Joakim Roman	(Sweden) Thomas Fredriksson	(Sweden) Joakim Roman	Mitsubishi Lancer Evo V	4:12:03.1	+36:01.0	0
43	19	73	(Sweden) Anders Wänn	(Sweden) Mikael Eriksson	(Sweden) Anders Wänn	Peugeot 106 S16	4:12:12.7	+36:10.6	0
44	20	83	(Sweden) Lars Johansson	(Sweden) Magnus Lörd	(Sweden) Lars Johansson	Opel Astra GSi 16V	4:14:25.8	+38:23.7	0
45	21	58	(Belgium) Joost Boxoen	(Belgium) Bram Bourgeois	(Belgium) Joost Boxoen	Mitsubishi Lancer Evo V	4:15:36.3	+39:34.2	0
46	22	85	(Sweden) Anders Florén	(Sweden) Curt Rosén	(Sweden) Anders Florén	Volkswagen Golf GTI 16V	4:16:24.6	+40:22.5	0
47	23	86	(Norway) Nils Tronrud	(Norway) Gunhild Hvaal Engh	(Norway) Nils Tronrud	Nissan Almera Kit Car	4:16:43.1	+40:41.0	0
48	24	75	(Sweden) Magnus Jansson	(Sweden) Thomas Fredriksson	(Sweden) Magnus Jansson	Mitsubishi Lancer Evo IV	4:17:07.1	+41:05.0	0
49	25	81	(Germany) Andreas Mansfeld	(Netherlands) Marc de Jong	(Germany) Andreas Mansfeld	Honda Integra Type-R DC2	4:19:18.4	+43:16.3	0
50	26	94	(France) Jacques Gleizes	(France) Jeanine Porterat-Gleizes	(France) Jacques Gleizes	Citroën AX GTI	4:27:17.8	+51:15.7	0
51	27	91	(Sweden) Lasse Storm	(Sweden) Ulf Storm	(Sweden) Lasse Storm	Citroën AX GTI	4:27:59.0	+51:56.9	0
52	28	84	(Sweden) Johan Palola	(Sweden) Helena Eriksson	(Sweden) Johan Palola	SEAT Ibiza GTi 16V	4:30:05.1	+54:03.0	0
53	29	90	(France) Patrick Legros	(France) Frédéric Agnelli	(France) Patrick Legros	Honda Integra Type-R	5:14:35.6	+1:38:33.5	0
54	30	95	(Portugal) António Pinto dos Santos	(Portugal) Nuno Rodrigues da Silva	(Portugal) António Pinto dos Santos	Renault 4 GTL	5:24:56.2	+1:48:54.1	0
Retired SS20		92	(Sweden) Lars-Erik Kronberg	(Sweden) Thomas Nilsson	(Sweden) Lars-Erik Kronberg	Suzuki Swift GTi	Engine		0
Retired SS17		70	(Sweden) Mikael Stattin	(Sweden) Patrik Dybeck	(Sweden) Mikael Stattin	SEAT Ibiza GTi 16V	Engine		0
Retired SS16		69	(Sweden) Joachim Nilsson	(Sweden) Matthias Olofsson	(Sweden) Joachim Nilsson	Opel Astra GSi 16V	Engine		0
Retired SS16		77	(United Kingdom) Natalie Barratt	(United Kingdom) Elin Wolland	(United Kingdom) Natalie Barratt	Mitsubishi Lancer Evo VI	Over time limit		0
Retired SS13		61	(Sweden) Jerry Åhlin	(Sweden) Stefan Simonsson	(Sweden) Jerry Åhlin	Mitsubishi Lancer Evo V	Accident		0
Retired SS13		76	(United Kingdom) Julian Reynolds	(United Kingdom) Andrew Bull	(United Kingdom) Julian Reynolds	Mitsubishi Lancer Evo IV	Accident		0
Retired SS13		82	(Sweden) Peter Hillebjörk	(Sweden) Roger Hillebjörk	(Sweden) Peter Hillebjörk	Renault Mégane Coupé 16v	Mechanical		0
Retired SS11		87	(Sweden) Stanley Dickens	(Sweden) Lars Rosen	(Sweden) Stanley Dickens	SEAT Ibiza GTi 16V	Gearbox		0
Retired SS11		88	(Sweden) Bengt Karlsson	(Sweden) Tony Puumala	(Sweden) Bengt Karlsson	SEAT Ibiza GTi 16V	Mechanical		0
Retired SS8		40	(Sweden) Kristoffer Nilsson	(Sweden) Per Andersson	(Sweden) Kristoffer Nilsson	Subaru Impreza WRX STI RA	Engine		0
Retired SS7		39	(Sweden) Mats Karlsson	(Sweden) Anders Martinsson	(Sweden) Mats Karlsson	Mitsubishi Lancer Evo III	Retired		0
Retired SS6		78	(Italy) Alfredo De Dominicis	(Italy) Alessandro Mari	(Italy) Alfredo De Dominicis	Mitsubishi Lancer Evo V	Accident		0
Retired SS2		74	(Sweden) Anders Grundström	(Sweden) Lars-Ola Nordqvist	(Sweden) Anders Grundström	Mitsubishi Lancer Evo V	Engine		0
Retired SS1		71	(Sweden) Johan Jonsson	(Sweden) Mikael Persson	(Sweden) Johan Jonsson	Citroën Xsara VTS	Accident		0

==== Special stages ====
Day	Stage	Stage name	Length	Winner	Car	Time	Class leaders
Leg 1 (11 Feb)	SS1	Sågen 1	14.76 km	(Finland) Jani Paasonen	Mitsubishi Carisma GT Evo VI	8:33.0	(Finland) Jani Paasonen
Leg 1 (11 Feb)	SS2	Rämmen 1	23.44 km	(Finland) Jani Paasonen	Mitsubishi Carisma GT Evo VI	13:02.0	(Finland) Jani Paasonen
Leg 1 (11 Feb)	SS3	Hamra	28.59 km	(Finland) Juuso Pykälistö	Mitsubishi Carisma GT Evo VI	16:05.4	(Finland) Juuso Pykälistö
Leg 1 (11 Feb)	SS4	Torsby	2.79 km	(Sweden) Stig-Olov Walfridsson (Sweden) Mattias Ekström	Mitsubishi Lancer Evo VI; Mitsubishi Lancer Evo IV	2:16.1	(Finland) Juuso Pykälistö
Leg 1 (11 Feb)	SS5	Bjälverud	21.58 km	(Sweden) Stig-Olov Walfridsson	Mitsubishi Lancer Evo VI	11:31.6	(Finland) Juuso Pykälistö
Leg 1 (11 Feb)	SS6	Mangen	13.29 km	(Finland) Jani Paasonen	Mitsubishi Carisma GT Evo VI	7:22.6	(Finland) Juuso Pykälistö
Leg 1 (11 Feb)	SS7	Arvika	2.00 km	Stage cancelled			(Finland) Juuso Pykälistö
Leg 1 (11 Feb)	SS8	Långjohanstorp	19.44 km	(Sweden) Stig-Olov Walfridsson	Mitsubishi Lancer Evo VI	10:20.1	(Finland) Juuso Pykälistö
Leg 1 (11 Feb)	SS9	I2	3.40 km	(Sweden) Kenneth Bäcklund	Mitsubishi Lancer Evo VI	2:10.5	(Finland) Juuso Pykälistö
Leg 2 (12 Feb)	SS10	Fredriksberg	27.39 km	(Finland) Jani Paasonen	Mitsubishi Carisma GT Evo VI	16:41.5	(Finland) Juuso Pykälistö
Leg 2 (12 Feb)	SS11	Nyhammar	27.79 km	(Finland) Jani Paasonen	Mitsubishi Carisma GT Evo VI	15:35.1	(Finland) Juuso Pykälistö
Leg 2 (12 Feb)	SS12	Skog 1	24.19 km	(Finland) Jani Paasonen	Mitsubishi Carisma GT Evo VI	13:47.0	(Finland) Jani Paasonen
Leg 2 (12 Feb)	SS13	Jutbo	47.65 km	(Finland) Jani Paasonen	Mitsubishi Carisma GT Evo VI	28:33.8	(Finland) Jani Paasonen
Leg 2 (12 Feb)	SS14	Skog 2	24.19 km	(Finland) Jani Paasonen	Mitsubishi Carisma GT Evo VI	14:03.8	(Finland) Jani Paasonen
Leg 2 (12 Feb)	SS15	Lugnet	2.00 km	(Sweden) Kenneth Bäcklund	Mitsubishi Lancer Evo VI	2:05.4	(Finland) Jani Paasonen
Leg 3 (13 Feb)	SS16	Malta	11.88 km	(Finland) Juuso Pykälistö	Mitsubishi Carisma GT Evo VI	6:15.0	(Finland) Jani Paasonen
Leg 3 (13 Feb)	SS17	Ullen	24.62 km	(Finland) Jani Paasonen	Mitsubishi Carisma GT Evo VI	13:08.4	(Finland) Jani Paasonen
Leg 3 (13 Feb)	SS18	Sågen 2	14.76 km	(Finland) Jani Paasonen	Mitsubishi Carisma GT Evo VI	8:22.9	(Finland) Jani Paasonen
Leg 3 (13 Feb)	SS19	Rämmen 2	23.44 km	(Sweden) Mattias Ekström	Mitsubishi Lancer Evo IV	12:49.9	(Finland) Jani Paasonen
Leg 3 (13 Feb)	SS20	Hagfors	21.21 km	(Sweden) Kenneth Bäcklund	Mitsubishi Lancer Evo VI	12:24.1	(Finland) Jani Paasonen

==== Championship standings ====
Pos.	Drivers' championships		
Pos.	Move	Driver	Points
1		(Austria) Manfred Stohl	13
2	New entry	(Finland) Jani Paasonen	10
3	1	(Uruguay) Gustavo Trelles	6
4	New entry	(Finland) Juuso Pykälistö	6
5	2	(Italy) Gianluigi Galli	4
