= Motor Sport Developments =

Auto racing team and motorsport engineering company

- Type: Privately held company
- Industry: Motorsport; Automotive engineering
- Founded: 22 November 1990
- Defunct: 27 June 2023
- Headquarters: Milton Keynes, England
- Key people: David Whitehead (owner, Managing Director)

Motor Sport Developments Limited (MSD) was an automotive engineering and motorsport company based in Milton Keynes in the United Kingdom.

The company was responsible for running the Hyundai World Rally Team on behalf of Hyundai Motor Company between the years of 2000 and 2003, before an abrupt end to the program resulted in legal action between the two parties and near collapse of MSD.

== History ==
=== Rally ===
Hyundai Motor Sport first approached MSD to compete in the 2-litre Cup (also known as F2 or Formula 2) of the World Rally Championship in 1998 and 1999 using a Hyundai Coupe. The Group A kit-car was prepared by the company and entered into the cup with owner and managing director David Whitehead also assuming the role of Team Principal. Kenneth Eriksson was recruited to head the challenge, with Australian Wayne Bell also employed to contest 5 events. Bell finished 4th in class in the car's debut at the 1998 Rally Portugal. The team finished 5th and bottom of the cup standings at the end of 1998, and 2nd out of two teams in 1999.

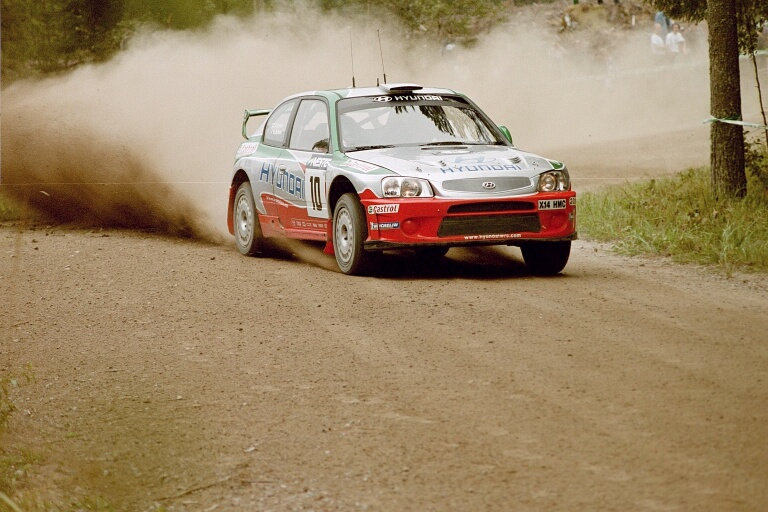
Hyundai Accent WRC

From 2000, MSD ran the Hyundai World Rally Team using brand new Hyundai Accent World Rally Cars which were unveiled in 1999. Alister McRae, brother of 1995 world champion Colin, was recruited to front the campaign, with veteran Eriksson retained. Their best result was fourth overall in 2001 Rally of Great Britain.

In 2003, the world rally campaign was halted when Hyundai cancelled funding following a season of budget constraints and limited testing and car development. Motor Sport Developments prepared legal action against Hyundai alleging breach of contract, in return Hyundai accused MSD of failing to produce audited accounts. Whitehead commented that 100 members of staff were made redundant as a consequence of the withdrawal.

=== Other ventures ===
Besides Hyundai, MSD also ran a rally program for Opel, and circuit racing campaigns for Opel, Honda, Vauxhall and Peugeot in the 1990s.

== See also ==
- Hyundai Motorsport
