= Hyundai Accent WRC =

Hyundai World Rally Car

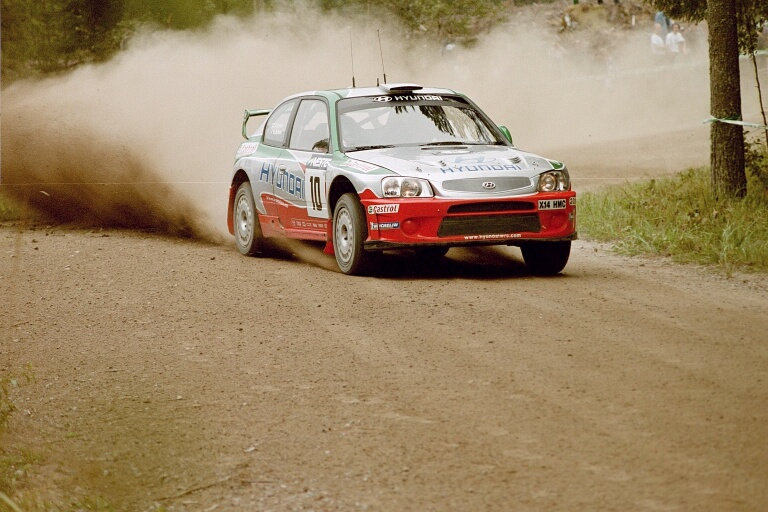
- Alister McRae driving an Accent WRC2 at the 2001 Rally Finland.
- Category: World Rally Car
- Constructor: Motor Sport Developments
- Designer: Nick Clipson (Chief Engineer)
- Successor: Hyundai i20 WRC (Hyundai Motorsport GmbH)

Technical specifications
- Length: 4,200 mm (165.4 in)
- Width: 1,770 mm (69.7 in)
- Height: 1,332 mm (52.4 in)
- Axle track: 1,550 mm (61.0 in)
- Wheelbase: 2,440 mm (96.1 in)
- Engine: Hyundai G4GF 2.0 L (122.0 cu in) I4 turbocharged front-engine, four-wheel-drive
- Transmission: Six-speed sequential
- Weight: 1,230 kg (2,711.7 lb)
- Tyres: Michelin

Competition history (WRC)
- Notable entrants: (South Korea) Hyundai Castrol World Rally Team
- Notable drivers: (Sweden) Kenneth Eriksson; (Finland) Juha Kankkunen; (Italy) Piero Liatti; (Belgium) Freddy Loix; (United Kingdom) Alister McRae; (Germany) Armin Schwarz
- Debut: 2000 Rally Sweden
Races	Wins	Podiums	Titles
48	0	0	0

The Hyundai Accent WRC is a World Rally Car built for the Hyundai Castrol World Rally Team by Motor Sport Developments to compete in the World Rally Championship. It is based upon the Hyundai Accent road car, and was debuted at the 2000 Rally Sweden.

== Competition history ==
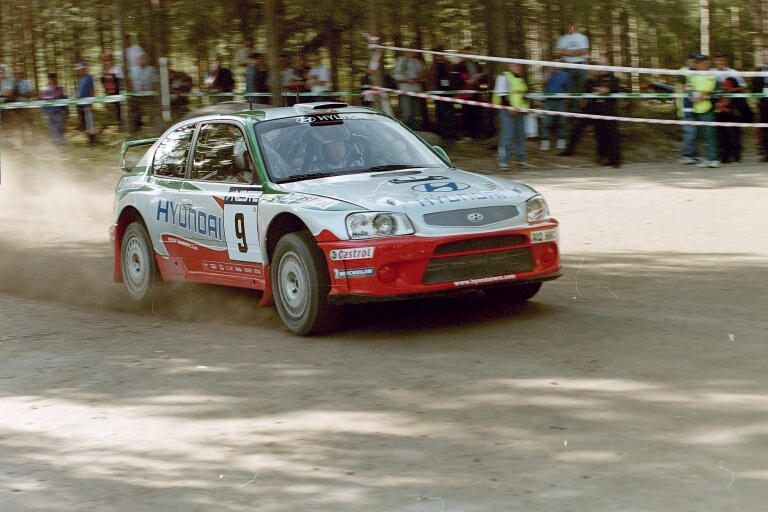
Kenneth Eriksson driving an Accent WRC2 at the 2001 Rally Finland.

The Accent WRC competed in an official capacity, spawning three generations, in the World Rally Championship from 2000 to 2003. After development and testing in 1999, the Hyundai World Rally Team and Motor Sport Developments (MSD) debuted the Accent WRC at the 2000 Swedish Rally. The second evolution, Accent WRC2, featured revised aerodynamics, active front differential, longer suspension travel and improved suspension top mounts, although most of the attention was directed at improving reliability. Like its predecessor's, the car's best result in a WRC event remained a fourth place. The Accent WRC3, featuring new dampers and engine internals among other changes, debuted at the 2002 Tour de Corse.

The car, though, in such hands across its lifespan as the four-time world champion Juha Kankkunen, ex-Subaru rally-winning and former Group A champion Kenneth Eriksson and former British Rally Champion Alister McRae, showed some promise. Belgian Freddy Loix and 1991 Rally Catalunya winner Armin Schwarz were among the other drivers synonymous with life in the Accent.

Due to budget constraints, the car's development was virtually halted during the 2003 season. In September, Hyundai announced its withdrawal from the WRC. They returned to the championship in 2014, with Hyundai i20 WRC, which was unveiled at the 2012 Paris Motor Show.

== Gallery ==
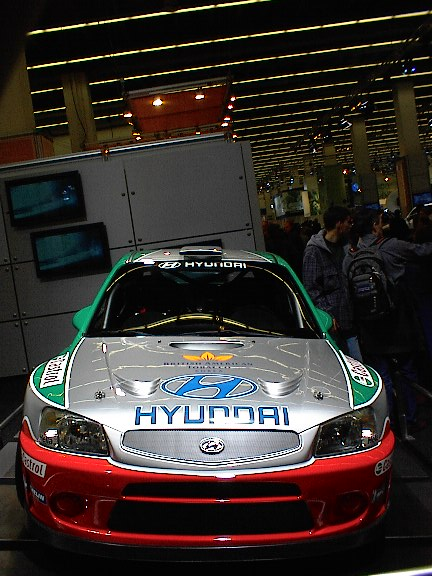

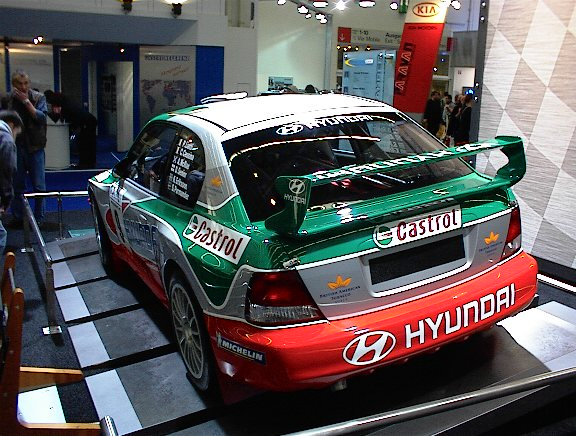

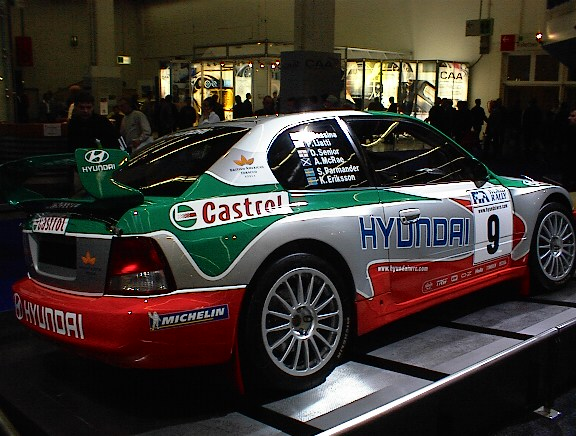
