= Hyundai World Rally Team =

Rallying team representing Hyundai

Hyundai WRT
- Full name: Hyundai Shell Mobis World Rally Team
- Base: Alzenau, Germany (Note: Team base and competition licence through Deutscher Motor Sport Bund); South Korea (Note: Car homologations through Korea Automobile Racing Association)
- Team principal(s): (France) Cyril Abiteboul
- Drivers: (Belgium) Thierry Neuville (France) Adrien Fourmaux
- Co-drivers: (Belgium) Martijn Wydaeghe (France) Alexandre Coria
- Chassis: Hyundai i20 N Rally1
- Tyres: Hankook

World Rally Championship history
- Debut: 2000 Swedish Rally
- Manufacturers' Championships: 2 (2019, 2020)
- Drivers' Championships: 1 (2024)
- Rally wins: 32

The Hyundai World Rally Team is a rally team competing in the World Rally Championship (WRC) as the official Hyundai entrant. Its team principal is Cyril Abiteboul, and its drivers in the 2025 season include Thierry Neuville, Ott Tanak and Adrien Fourmaux. The team has entered WRC every year since 2014 by Hyundai Motorsport, a division of Hyundai Motors based in Alzenau, Germany. Between the years of 2000 to 2003, the team was run by Motor Sport Developments of Milton Keynes, United Kingdom, on behalf of Hyundai Motor Sport.

The team has twice won the World Rally Championship for Manufacturers, in 2019 and 2020. For sponsorship purposes it has been known to vary its name when entering the WRC.

== History ==
=== 1998–1999: Prelude ===
The Hyundai Motor Sport division entered into the 2-litre World Rally Cup in the WRC (also known as Formula 2 or F2 cup) in 1998 and 1999. The entry was run by British company Motor Sport Development (MSD), with David Whitehead as team principal. An attempt at the flagship Manufacturers Championship was not possible as they did not have a suitable car, and MSD took on the dual mandate of running the Hyundai Coupe in the cup whilst developing a World Rally Car. In September 1999, the Accent WRC, based on the Hyundai Accent, was unveiled with a view to make a debut in the following season.

=== 2000–2003 ===
The Hyundai World Rally Team debuted the car at the 2000 Swedish Rally and achieved their first top-ten result at that year's Rally Argentina, when Alister McRae and Kenneth Eriksson finished seventh and eighth, respectively. Eriksson later drove the car to fifth place in New Zealand and fourth in Australia. In 2001, Hyundai debuted a new evolution of the Accent WRC, which was intended to improve reliability, but the performance of the car was still not good enough to challenge the four big teams (Ford World Rally Team, Mitsubishi, Peugeot and Subaru). However, at the season-ending Rally GB, the team achieved their best result with McRae finishing fourth and Eriksson sixth.

For the 2002 season, Hyundai hired the four-time world champion Juha Kankkunen, along with Freddy Loix and Armin Schwarz. Kankkunen's fifth place in New Zealand was the team's best result, but it managed to edge out Škoda and Mitsubishi by one point in the battle for fourth place in the manufacturers' world championship. In September 2003, after a season hampered by budget constraints, Hyundai withdraw from the WRC ending the partnership with MSD and vowing to form their own in-house operation to return in 2006.

=== 2012–present ===
At the 2012 Paris Motor Show, Hyundai announced that it would be returning to the WRC for 2014, eight years later than planned, using the i20 model built to World Rally Car specifications. Hyundai nominated Juho Hänninen, Bryan Bouffier and Chris Atkinson as the official test drivers for 2013.

On 19 December 2012, Hyundai Motorsport GmbH was established in Alzenau, Germany, responsible for Hyundai's World Rally Championship programme.

==== 2014 WRC season ====
Thierry Neuville was named lead driver for Hyundai Motorsport's World Rally Championship programme and, together with his co-driver Nicolas Gilsoul, he has piloted the i20 WRC ever since the team's debut at the Monte-Carlo Rally in January. Also competing for Hyundai in 2014 were Dani Sordo and co-driver Marc Martí, who entered six events. Hänninen contested six rallies, while fellow test drivers Atkinson and Bouffier entered two each. Hayden Paddon and John Kennard joined the team for six rallies.

Neuville was the first driver to score a top-three finish for Hyundai in WRC. He finished third in Rally México. He and Hyundai also took the team's first victory at that year's Rallye Deutschland.

==== 2015 WRC season ====
For the 2015 WRC season, Neuville, Sordo, and Paddon returned to pilot the Hyundai i20 WRC. All three drivers added to the team's podium tally at Rally Sweden (Neuville), Rally Italia Sardegna (Neuville, Paddon), and Rally de España (Sordo). Dutch driver Kevin Abbring competed in five events for the team. Hyundai Motorsport finished third in the manufacturers’ championship.

==== 2016 WRC season ====
2016 saw Hyundai Motorsport regularly challenging for podiums and victories. Paddon took the team's first victory with the New Generation Hyundai i20 WRC in Rally Argentina. Neuville won Rally Italia Sardegna and scored seven podiums, ultimately finishing runner-up behind Volkswagen driver Sébastien Ogier. The team finished as vice champions in the manufacturers’ championship.

==== 2017 WRC season ====
New regulations for the 2017 season saw the birth of the Hyundai i20 Coupe WRC. Hyundai announced a crew line up of Neuville and Gilsoul, Sordo and Martí, Paddon and Kennard. Paddon was later joined by new co-driver Seb Marshall. Andreas Mikkelsen and co-driver Anders Jæger later signed for three events.

Neuville scored four wins and eight podiums in 2017, again finishing runner up to Ogier, who had switched to M-Sport. Hyundai finished second in the manufacturers’ standings for the second consecutive year.

==== 2018 WRC season ====
At the season launch at Autosport International, Hyundai unveiled its 2018 crew line-up. Neuville and Mikkelsen would compete in every round, with Sordo and Paddon alternating events. Sordo was reunited with his previous co-driver Carlos del Barrio for the season. A four-car entry for Rally Portugal ensured equal appearances for Sordo and Paddon. Neuville secured three wins and claimed six podiums, but was again outscored by Ogier.

==== 2019 WRC season ====
For 2019, Hyundai Motorsport announced it would field four crews for the WRC season: Neuville and Gilsoul, Mikkelsen and Jæger-Amland, Sordo and del Barrio, and Sébastien Loeb and Daniel Elena. Craig Breen and Paul Nagle later joined the squad for Rally Finland and Wales Rally GB as the team focused its efforts on winning the manufacturers’ championship. Hyundai Motorsport sealed the 2019 Manufacturer's Title after Rally Catalunya as Rally Australia was called off amid widespread bush fires in the area.

== See also ==
- Hyundai Motorsport
- Motor Sport Developments
- Hyundai World Rally Championship results
- World Rally Championship
