= Daniel Grataloup =

French-Swiss architect (1937–2026)

- Born: 25 December 1937; Lyon, France
- Died: 15 April 2026 (aged 88); Geneva, Switzerland
- Occupation: Architect

Daniel Grataloup (French: [danjˈɛl ɡʁatalˈup]; 25 December 1937 – 15 April 2026) was a French-Swiss architect.

Originally from Lyon, Grataloup spent much of his career in Geneva. In 2012, the Museum of Modern Art in New York City acquired his works. They are now exhibited in the museum's permanent collection.

Grataloup died in Geneva on 15 April 2026, at the age of 88.
