= 2000 World Rally Championship =

28th season of the FIA World Rally Championship

Champions
- World Drivers' Champion: Marcus Grönholm
- World Manufacturers' Champion: Peugeot

Seasons
- ← 1999 2001 →

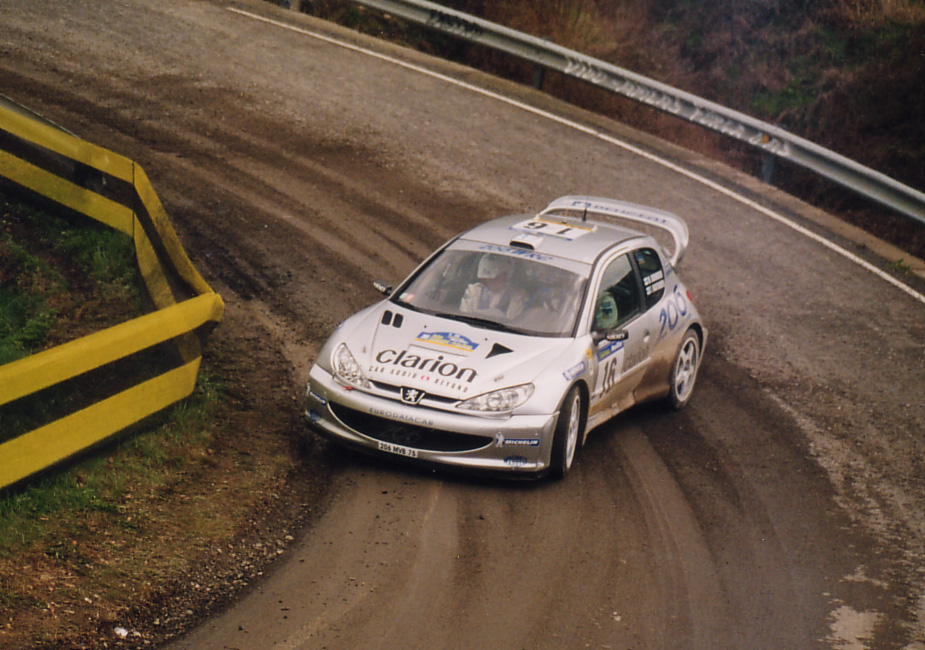
Eventual champion Marcus Grönholm driving a Peugeot 206 WRC at the 2000 Rallye Catalunya.

The 2000 World Rally Championship was the 28th season of the FIA World Rally Championship. The season consisted of 14 rallies. The drivers' world championship was won by Marcus Grönholm in a Peugeot 206 WRC, breaking the streak of Tommi Mäkinen who had won the previous 4 titles for Mitsubishi, ahead of Richard Burns and Carlos Sainz. The manufacturers' title was won by Peugeot, ahead of Ford and Subaru.

== Calendar ==
The 2000 championship was contested over fourteen rounds in Europe, Africa, South America and Oceania. Rally China was originally scheduled to be the tenth round of the season but was cancelled after primary sponsor British American Tobacco withdrew from the event. The Cyprus Rally was added to the calendar as a replacement.

Rd.	Start date	Finish date	Rally	Rally headquarters	Surface	Stages	Distance
1	19 January	22 January	(Monaco) 68th Rallye Automobile Monte Carlo	Monte Carlo	Mixed	15	412.81 km
2	10 February	13 February	(Sweden) 49th International Swedish Rally	Karlstad, Värmland County	Snow	20	378.41 km
3	24 February	27 February	48th Sameer Safari Rally Kenya	Nairobi	Gravel	12	1047.26 km
4	16 March	19 March	34th TAP Rallye de Portugal	Matosinhos, Porto	Gravel	23	398.35 km
5	30 March	2 April	(Spain) 36th Rallye Catalunya - Costa Brava - Rallye de España	Lloret de Mar, Catalonia	Tarmac	15	383.09 km
6	11 May	14 May	20th Rally Argentina	Carlos Paz, Córdoba	Gravel	22	385.49 km
7	22 June	25 June	(Greece) 47th Acropolis Rally	Itea, Phocis	Gravel	19	390.27 km
8	13 July	16 July	31st Propecia Rally New Zealand	Manukau, Auckland	Gravel	24	373.11 km
9	17 August	20 August	50th Neste Rally Finland	Jyväskylä, Central Finland	Gravel	23	410.18 km
10	7 September	10 September	28th Cyprus Rally	Limassol, Limassol District	Gravel	23	348.41 km
11	28 September	1 October	44th V-Rally Tour de Corse - Rallye de France	Ajaccio, Corsica	Tarmac	18	385.01 km
12	19 October	22 October	(Italy) 42nd Rallye Sanremo - Rallye d'Italia	Sanremo, Liguria	Tarmac	17	382.79 km
13	9 November	12 November	13th Telstra Rally Australia	Perth, Western Australia	Gravel	21	391.17 km
14	23 November	26 November	(United Kingdom) 56th Network Q Rally of Great Britain	Cardiff, Wales	Gravel	17	380.80 km

== Teams and drivers ==
World Rally Car entries ineligible to score manufacturer points
Manufacturer	Car	Team	Tyre	No	Drivers	Co-Drivers	Roudnds
Mitsubishi	Lancer Evo VI	(Japan) Marlboro Mitsubishi Ralliart	M	1	(Finland) Tommi Mäkinen	(Finland) Risto Mannisenmäki	All
Mitsubishi	Lancer Evo VI	(Japan) Marlboro Mitsubishi Ralliart	M	2	(Belgium) Freddy Loix	(Belgium) Sven Smeets	All
Subaru	Impreza WRC99 1-3 Impreza WRC2000 4-14	(Japan) Subaru World Rally Team	P	3	(United Kingdom) Richard Burns	(United Kingdom) Robert Reid	All
Subaru	Impreza WRC99 1-3 Impreza WRC2000 4-14	(Japan) Subaru World Rally Team	P	4	(Finland) Juha Kankkunen	(Finland) Juha Repo	1–10, 13–14
Subaru	Impreza WRC99 1-3 Impreza WRC2000 4-14	(Japan) Subaru World Rally Team	P	4	(France) Simon Jean-Joseph	(France) Jack Boyere	11–12
Subaru	Impreza WRC99 1-3 Impreza WRC2000 4-14	(Japan) Subaru World Rally Team	P	16	(Norway) Petter Solberg	(United Kingdom) Phil Mills	11–14
Subaru	Impreza WRC99 1-3 Impreza WRC2000 4-14	(Japan) Subaru World Rally Team	P	18	(Estonia) Markko Märtin	(United Kingdom) Michael Park	13
Ford	Focus WRC 00	(United Kingdom) Ford Motor Co	M	5	(United Kingdom) Colin McRae	(United Kingdom) Nicky Grist	All
Ford	Focus WRC 00	(United Kingdom) Ford Motor Co	M	6	(Spain) Carlos Sainz	(Spain) Luis Moya	All
Ford	Focus WRC 00	(United Kingdom) Ford Motor Co	M	16	(Norway) Petter Solberg	(United Kingdom) Phil Mills	3–4, 6–10
Ford	Focus WRC 00	(United Kingdom) Ford Motor Co	M	18	(Italy) Piero Liatti	(Italy) Carlo Cassina	11–12
Ford	Focus WRC 00	(United Kingdom) Ford Motor Co	M	18	(Finland) Tapio Laukkanen	(Finland) Kaj Lindström	9, 14
Ford	Focus WRC 00	(United Kingdom) Ford Motor Co	M	19	(Finland) Tapio Laukkanen	(Finland) Kaj Lindström	13
SEAT	Córdoba WRC Evo2 1-8 Córdoba WRC Evo3 9-14	(Spain) SEAT Sport	P	7	(France) Didier Auriol	(France) Denis Giraudet	All
SEAT	Córdoba WRC Evo2 1-8 Córdoba WRC Evo3 9-14	(Spain) SEAT Sport	P	8	(Finland) Toni Gardemeister	(Finland) Paavo Lukander	All
SEAT	Córdoba WRC Evo2 1-8 Córdoba WRC Evo3 9-14	(Spain) SEAT Sport	P	17	(Finland) Harri Rovanperä	(Finland) Risto Pietiläinen	2, 14
SEAT	Córdoba WRC Evo2 1-8 Córdoba WRC Evo3 9-14	(Spain) SEAT Sport	P	20	(United Kingdom) Gwyndaf Evans	(United Kingdom) Howard Davies	14
SEAT	Córdoba WRC Evo2 1-8 Córdoba WRC Evo3 9-14	(Spain) SEAT Sport	P	23	(Portugal) Rui Madeira	(Portugal) Fernando Prata	4
SEAT	Córdoba WRC Evo2 1-8 Córdoba WRC Evo3 9-14	(Spain) SEAT Sport	P	30	(Austria) Raphael Sperrer	(Sweden) Per Carlsson	9
SEAT	Córdoba WRC Evo2 1-8 Córdoba WRC Evo3 9-14	(Spain) SEAT Sport	P	51	(Belgium) Renaud Verreydt	(Belgium) Jean-François Elst	12
Peugeot	206 WRC	(France) Peugeot Esso	M	9	(France) François Delecour	(France) Daniel Grataloup	1–2, 4–8, 10–14
Peugeot	206 WRC	(France) Peugeot Esso	M	9	(France) Gilles Panizzi	(France) Herve Panizzi	3
Peugeot	206 WRC	(France) Peugeot Esso	M	9	(Finland) Sebastian Lindholm	(Finland) Jukka Aho	9
Peugeot	206 WRC	(France) Peugeot Esso	M	10	(France) Gilles Panizzi	(France) Herve Panizzi	1, 5, 11–12
Peugeot	206 WRC	(France) Peugeot Esso	M	10	(Finland) Marcus Grönholm	(Finland) Timo Rautiainen	2–4, 6–10, 13–14
Peugeot	206 WRC	(France) Peugeot Esso	M	16	(Finland) Marcus Grönholm	(Finland) Timo Rautiainen	1, 5, 11–12
Peugeot	206 WRC	(France) Peugeot Esso	M	18	(France) François Delecour	(France) Daniel Grataloup	9
Peugeot	206 WRC	(France) Peugeot Esso	M	19	(Portugal) Adruzilo Lopes	(Portugal) Luis Lisboa	4–5
Peugeot	206 WRC	(France) Peugeot Esso	M	19	(France) Gilles Panizzi	(France) Herve Panizzi	13–14
Škoda	Octavia WRC	(Czech Republic) Škoda Motorsport	M	11	(Germany) Armin Schwarz	(Germany) Manfred Hiemer	1, 3–5, 7, 10, 12, 14
Škoda	Octavia WRC	(Czech Republic) Škoda Motorsport	M	12	(Spain) Luís Climent	(Spain) Alex Romani	1, 3–5, 7, 10, 12, 14
Hyundai	Accent WRC	(South Korea) Hyundai World Rally Team	M	14	(Sweden) Kenneth Eriksson	(Sweden) Staffan Parmander	2, 4–9, 11–14
Hyundai	Accent WRC	(South Korea) Hyundai World Rally Team	M	15	(United Kingdom) Alister McRae	(United Kingdom) David Senior	2, 4–9, 11–14
Hyundai	Accent WRC	(South Korea) Hyundai World Rally Team	M	23	(Australia) Michael Guest	(Australia) David Green	13

World Rally Car entries ineligible to score manufacturer points
Manufacturer	Car	Team	Tyre	Drivers	Co-Drivers	Rounds
Toyota	Corolla WRC	(Italy) H.F. Grifone SRL	M	(Belgium) Bruno Thiry	(Belgium) Stéphane Prévot	1
Toyota	Corolla WRC	(Italy) H.F. Grifone SRL	M	(Italy) Pier Lorenzo Zanchi	(Italy) Dario D'Esposito	1
Toyota	Corolla WRC	(Italy) H.F. Grifone SRL	M	(Finland) Harri Rovanperä	(Finland) Risto Pietiläinen	4,9
Toyota	Corolla WRC	(Italy) H.F. Grifone SRL	M	(Italy) Andrea Navarra	(Italy) Simona Fedeli	5, 14
Toyota	Corolla WRC	(Italy) H.F. Grifone SRL	M	(Italy) Piero Longhi	(Italy) Lucio Baggio	12
Toyota	Corolla WRC	(Italy) H.F. Grifone SRL	M	(Italy) Ettore Baita	(Italy) Enrico Brazzoli	12
Toyota	Corolla WRC	Toyota Castrol Team Denmark	M	(Denmark) Henrik Lundgaard	(Denmark) Jens-Christian Anker	1, 5, 12
Toyota	Corolla WRC	Toyota Castrol Switzerland	M	(Switzerland) Olivier Burri	(Switzerland) Christophe Hofmann	1, 11
Toyota	Corolla WRC	(Italy) Alessandro Ghezzi	M	(Italy) Alessandro Ghezzi	(Italy) Primo Zonca	1
Toyota	Corolla WRC	Toyota Castrol Team Sweden	M	(Sweden) Thomas Rådström	(Sweden) Christina Thörner	2
Toyota	Corolla WRC	Toyota Castrol Team Sweden	M	(Sweden) Thomas Rådström	(Sweden) Jörgen Skallman	4
Toyota	Corolla WRC	(Estonia) Lukoil EOS Rally Team	M	(Estonia) Markko Märtin	(United Kingdom) Michael Park	2, 4–5, 7, 9–10, 12, 14
Toyota	Corolla WRC	Toyota Castrol Team Finland	M	(Finland) Pasi Hagström	(Finland) Tero Gardemeister	2, 4, 7, 10, 12–13
Toyota	Corolla WRC	(Finland) LPM Human Heat	P	(Finland) Janne Tuohino	(Finland) Miikka Anttila	2, 4, 9, 14
Toyota	Corolla WRC	(Sweden) Säffle MC	M	(Sweden) Daniel Carlsson	(Sweden) Benny Melander	2
Toyota	Corolla WRC	(Portugal) Telecel Castrol Team	M	(Portugal) Pedro Chaves	(Portugal) Sérgio Paiva	4
Toyota	Corolla WRC	(Greece) Toyota Hellas	P	(Greece) Armodios Vovos	(Greece) Ioánnis Alvanos	4
Toyota	Corolla WRC	(Greece) Toyota Hellas	P	(Greece) Armodios Vovos	(Greece) Spiros Koltsidas	7
Toyota	Corolla WRC	(Norway) Henning Solberg	M	(Norway) Henning Solberg	(Norway) Runar Pedersen	9
Toyota	Corolla WRC	(Norway) Henning Solberg	M	(Norway) Henning Solberg	(Norway) Ola Fløene	14
Toyota	Corolla WRC	Equipe de France FFSA	M	(France) Sébastien Loeb	(Monaco) Daniel Elena	11–12
Toyota	Corolla WRC	(Germany) Uwe Nittel	M	(Germany) Uwe Nittel	(Germany) Detlef Ruf	12
Toyota	Corolla WRC	Toyota Team Australia	M	(Australia) Neal Bates	(Australia) Coral Taylor	13
Toyota	Corolla WRC	(Germany) Achim Warmbold	M	(Germany) Achim Warmbold	(Germany) Antony Warmbold	14
Toyota	Corolla WRC	(Norway) NMK Drammen	M	(Norway) Roar Vannebo	(Norway) Øygund Treider	14
Toyota	Corolla WRC	(Poland) Polsat Dialog Rally Team	M	(Poland) Tomasz Kuchar	(Poland) Maciej Szczepaniak	9, 12
Toyota	Corolla WRC	Toyota Team Saudi Arabia	M	(Saudi Arabia) Abdullah Bakhashab	(United Kingdom) Bobby Willis	2, 4–5, 7, 9–10, 12
Toyota	Corolla WRC	(Turkey) Toyota Team Atakan	M	(Turkey) Serkan Yazici	(Turkey) Erkan Bodur	5–7, 11–13
Subaru	Impreza WRC99	(United Kingdom) Nigel Heath	P	(United Kingdom) Nigel Heath	(United Kingdom) Jeff Ashfield	6
Subaru	Impreza WRC99	(United Kingdom) Nigel Heath	P	(United Kingdom) Nigel Heath	(United Kingdom) Steve Lancaster	10, 13
Subaru	Impreza WRC98	(Greece) Ioannis Papadimitriou	M	(Greece) Ioannis Papadimitriou	(Greece) Nikolaos Petropoulos	4
Subaru	Impreza WRC99	(Greece) Ioannis Papadimitriou	M	(Greece) Ioannis Papadimitriou	(Greece) Nikolaos Petropoulos	7, 10, 12-13
Subaru	Impreza WRC99	(Italy) Procar Rally Team	P	(Italy) Andrea Dallavilla	(Italy) Danilo Fappani	5, 11-12
Subaru	Impreza WRC99	(Italy) Procar Rally Team	P	(Italy) Paolo Andreucci	(Italy) Giovanni Bernacchini	12
Subaru	Impreza WRC99	(Italy) Procar Rally Team	P	(Italy) Diego Oldrati	(Italy) Alessandra Materazzetti	12
Subaru	Impreza WRC98	Subaru Rally Team Australia	P	(New Zealand) Peter 'Possum' Bourne	(New Zealand) Craig Vincent	8, 13
Subaru	Impreza WRC98	(France) Simon Jean-Joseph	P	(France) Simon Jean-Joseph	(France) Jacques Boyere	10
Subaru	Impreza WRC98	(Republic of Ireland) Eamonn Boland	P	(Republic of Ireland) Eamonn Boland	(United Kingdom) Alun Cook	14
Subaru	Impreza WRC98	(Netherlands) Subaru Nederland	M	(Netherlands) Bert de Jong	(Netherlands) Ton Hillen	14
Subaru	Impreza WRC99	(Poland) Wizja TV / Turning Point RT	M	(Poland) Krzysztof Hołowczyc	(Belgium) Jean-Marc Fortin	2, 4, 6–7, 10
Subaru	Impreza WRC99	(Japan) Spike Subaru Team	P	(Japan) Toshihiro Arai	(United Kingdom) Roger Freeman	3, 5, 7–8, 10, 13–14
Subaru	Impreza WRC98	(France) F.Dor Rally Team	M	(France) Frédéric Dor	(France) Didier Breton	3
Subaru	Impreza WRC99	(France) F.Dor Rally Team	M	(France) Frédéric Dor	(France) Didier Breton	4, 6-7, 9-10, 14
Subaru	Impreza WRC99	(Oman) Arab World Rally Team		(Oman) Hamed Al-Wahaibi	(New Zealand) Tony Sircombe	7, 11-12, 14
Ford	Escort WRC	(Norway) Henning Solberg		(Norway) Henning Solberg	(Norway) Runar Pedersen	2,4
Ford	Escort WRC	(Sweden) Bo-Be Plastindustri AB	Y	(Sweden) Mats Jonsson	(Sweden) Johnny Johansson	2
Ford	Focus RS WRC 99	(Poland) Marlboro Ford Mobil 1 Team	M	(Poland) Janusz Kulig	(Poland) Jarosław Baran	4, 12
Ford	Focus RS WRC 00	(United Kingdom) Stephen Finlay	P	(United Kingdom) Stephen Finlay	(Republic of Ireland) Rory Kennedy	7, 14
Ford	Escort WRC	(Greece) Leonídas Kirkos	M	(Greece) Leonídas Kirkos	(Greece) Giorgos Polizois	7
Ford	Escort WRC	(Finland) Jussi Välimäki		(Finland) Jussi Välimäki	(Finland) Jarkko Kalliolepo	9
Hyundai	Accent WRC	(Australia) Hyundai Winfield Rally Team	M	(Australia) Michael Guest	(Australia) David Green	9, 12
Peugeot	206 WRC	Equipe de France FFSA	M	(France) Fabrice Morel	(France) David Marty	5, 11–12
Peugeot	206 WRC	(United Kingdom) Mark Fisher	M	(United Kingdom) Mark Fisher	(United Kingdom) Gordon Noble	7, 14
SEAT	Córdoba WRC Evo2	(Spain) RACC Motorsport	P	(Spain) Salvador Cañellas	(Spain) Carlos del Barrio	5

=== Kit Car World Rally Cup Private teams ===
Team	Manufacturer	Car	Tyre	Drivers	Co-drivers	Rounds
Renault Team Sweden	Renault	Mégane Maxi	P	(Sweden) Jonas Kruse	(Sweden) Per Schlegel	2
Renault Sport Belgium	Renault	Mégane Maxi	M	(Belgium) Kris Princen	(Belgium) Dany Colebunders	4–5, 7, 12
(Argentina) Jorge Bescham	Renault	Mégane Maxi		(Argentina) Jorge Bescham	(Argentina) Aldo Arguello	6
(Greece) "Leonidas"	Renault	Mégane Maxi		(Greece) "Leonidas"	(Greece) Maria Pavli-Korre	7
(France) Benoît Rousselot	Renault	Mégane Maxi	M	(France) Benoît Rousselot	(France) Xavier Panseri	11
Opel Team Sweden	Opel	Astra Kit Car	M	(Sweden) Per Svan	(Sweden) Johan Olsson	2
(Kenya) Gregory Kibiti	Hyundai	Coupé		(Kenya) Gregory Kibiti	(Kenya) George Mwangi	3
(Australia) Hyundai Winfield Rally Team	Hyundai	Coupe Evo 2	M	(Australia) Michael Guest	(Australia) David Green	4–5, 7
(Italy) F.P.F. Sport	Peugeot	306 Maxi	M	(Italy) Renato Travaglia	(Italy) Flavio Zanella	5, 12
(Belgium) Autostal Duindistel	Peugeot	306 Maxi	M	(Belgium) Dominique Bruyneel	(Belgium) Philippe Droeven	5
(Norway) NAF Asker & Bærum Junior Team	SEAT	Ibiza Kit Car Evo2	C	(Norway) Birger Gundersen	(Norway) Cato Menkerud	5
(France) Citroën Sport	Citroën	Xsara F2	M	(Spain) Jesús Puras	(Spain) Marc Martí	5
(France) Citroën Sport	Citroën	Saxo Kit Car	M	(Spain) Jesús Puras	(Spain) Marc Martí	11–12
(France) Citroën Sport	Citroën	Saxo Kit Car	M	(France) Philippe Bugalski	(France) Jean-Paul Chiaroni	7, 11–12
Equipe de France FFSA	Citroën	Saxo Kit Car	M	(France) Sébastien Loeb	(Monaco) Daniel Elena	9, 14
VW Porsche Slovenia	Volkswagen	Golf III Kit Car	D	(Slovenia) Darko Peljhan	(Slovenia) Miran Kacin	5
Volkswagen Motorsport Australia	Volkswagen	Golf IV Kit Car	Y	(Australia) Simon Evans	(Australia) Sue Evans	8, 13
(Italy) Mirabella Mille Miglia	Fiat	Punto Kit Car	M	(Italy) Luca Pedersoli	(Italy) Nadia Mazzon	11–12
(United Kingdom) Vauxhall Motorsport	Vauxhall	Astra Kit Car	M	(United Kingdom) Mark Higgins	(United Kingdom) Bryan Thomas	14
(United Kingdom) Vauxhall Motorsport	Vauxhall	Astra Kit Car	M	(United Kingdom) Neil Wearden	(United Kingdom) Trevor Agnew	14

=== FIA Group N Cup major entries ===
Team	Manufacturer	Car	Tyre	Drivers	Co-drivers	Rounds
(Austria) Stohl Racing	Mitsubishi	Lancer Evo VI	P	(Austria) Manfred Stohl	(Austria) Peter Müller	All
(Austria) Stohl Racing	Mitsubishi	Lancer Evo VI	P	(Austria) Rudolf Stohl	(Austria) Ilka Minor	3
(Uruguay) Gustavo Trelles	Mitsubishi	Lancer Evo VI	P	(Uruguay) Gustavo Trelles	(Argentina) Jorge Del Buono	1, 4–14
(Italy) Vieffe Corse SRL	Mitsubishi	Lancer Evo V	P	(Italy) Gianluigi Galli	(Italy) Guido D'Amore	1–2, 4
(Italy) Vieffe Corse SRL	Mitsubishi	Lancer Evo VI	P	(Italy) Gianluigi Galli	(Italy) Guido D'Amore	9, 11–12
(Switzerland) Olivier Gillet	Mitsubishi	Lancer Evo VI	M	(Switzerland) Olivier Gillet	(Monaco) Freddy Delorme	1
(Italy) Andrea Maselli	Mitsubishi	Lancer Evo V	P	(Italy) Andrea Maselli	(Italy) Nicola Arena	1
(Slovenia) AK Olimpija	Mitsubishi	Lancer Evo VI	M	(Slovenia) Boris Popovič	(Italy) Antonio Morassi	1
(Germany) Uwe Nittel	Mitsubishi	Lancer Evo VI	P	(Germany) Uwe Nittel	(Germany) Detlef Ruf	1, 4–5, 7
(France) Philippe Rognoni	Mitsubishi	Lancer Evo VI	M	(France) Philippe Rognoni	(France) Etienne Patrone	1, 11
(Belgium) Guy Colsoul Rallysport	Mitsubishi	Lancer Evo V	M	(Belgium) Bob Colsoul	(Belgium) Tom Colsoul	1–2, 4–5, 7, 9, 11, 13–14
Mitsubishi Ralliart Finland	Mitsubishi	Lancer Carisma GT Evo VI	M	(Finland) Jani Paasonen	(Finland) Jakke Honkanen	2, 5, 9, 13
Mitsubishi Ralliart Finland	Mitsubishi	Lancer Carisma GT Evo VI	M	(Finland) Juuso Pykälistö	(Finland) Esko Mertsalmi	2, 9
Mitsubishi Ralliart Sweden	Mitsubishi	Lancer Evo VI	M	(Sweden) Stig-Olov Walfridsson	(Sweden) Lars Bäckman	2
Mitsubishi Ralliart Sweden	Mitsubishi	Lancer Evo VI	M	(Sweden) Kenneth Bäcklund	(Sweden) Tord Andersson	2, 4, 14
(Sweden) Mattias Ekström	Mitsubishi	Lancer Evo IV		(Sweden) Mattias Ekström	(Sweden) Stefan Bergman	2
(Sweden) Swedish ASF	Mitsubishi	Lancer Evo VI	P	(Sweden) Pernilla Solberg	(Sweden) Ulrika Mattsson	2, 5, 9, 14
(Russia) Cueks Racing	Mitsubishi	Lancer Evo VI		(Russia) Stanislav Gryazin	(Russia) Dmitriy Eremeev	2, 4–5, 9, 11–12
(Argentina) Claudio Marcelo Menzi	Mitsubishi	Lancer Evo VI	P	(Argentina) Claudio Marcelo Menzi	(Argentina) Edgardo Galindo	3–7, 9–13
(Argentina) Gabriel Pozzo	Mitsubishi	Lancer Evo VI	P	(Argentina) Gabriel Pozzo	(Argentina) Rodolfo Amelio Ortiz	3–7, 9–13
(Portugal) Mitsubishi Galp	Mitsubishi	Lancer Carisma GT Evo VI	M	(Portugal) Miguel Campos	(Portugal) Carlos Magalhães	4–5
(Peru) Ramón Ferreyros	Mitsubishi	Lancer Evo VI	M	(Peru) Ramón Ferreyros	(Peru) Gonzalo Saenz	4–7, 11–12, 14
(Portugal) Optiroc Competição	Mitsubishi	Lancer Evo V	M	(Portugal) Pedro Dias da Silva	(Portugal) Mário Castro	4
(Portugal) Américo Antunes	Mitsubishi	Lancer Evo IV		(Portugal) Américo Antunes	(Portugal) Paulo Moura	4
(Portugal) Vítor Pascoal	Mitsubishi	Lancer Evo VI	M	(Portugal) Vítor Pascoal	(Portugal) Duarte Costa	4
(Italy) Mirabella Mille Miglia	Mitsubishi	Lancer Evo VI		(Italy) Giovanni Manfrinato	(Italy) Claudio Condotta	4, 13
(United States) John Buffum	Mitsubishi	Lancer Evo V		(United States) John Buffum	(United Kingdom) Neil Wilson	4
(Spain) Jesús Puras	Mitsubishi	Lancer Evo VI	M	(Spain) Jesús Puras	(Spain) Marc Martí	4, 9
(Uruguay) Gabriel Méndez	Mitsubishi	Lancer Evo V	P	(Uruguay) Gabriel Méndez	(Uruguay) Daniel Muzio	4–8, 11
(Argentina) Oscar Chiaramello	Mitsubishi	Lancer Evo VI		(Argentina) Oscar Chiaramello	(Argentina) Ruben Quiroz	6
(Greece) Pavlos Moschoutis	Mitsubishi	Lancer Evo VI		(Greece) Pavlos Moschoutis	(Greece) Emmanouel Vardaxis	7, 10
(New Zealand) Reece Jones Rallysport	Mitsubishi	Lancer Evo VI		(New Zealand) Reece Jones	(New Zealand) Leo Bult	8, 11, 13–14
Ralliart New Zealand	Mitsubishi	Lancer Evo VI		(New Zealand) Chris West	(New Zealand) Garry Cowan	8
Ralliart New Zealand	Mitsubishi	Lancer Evo III		(New Zealand) Ross Meekings	(New Zealand) Alan Glen	8
(Japan) Advan-Piaa Rally Team	Mitsubishi	Lancer Evo VI	Y	(Japan) Fumio Nutahara	(Japan) Satoshi Hayashi	8
(Finland) Kaukokiito	Mitsubishi	Lancer Carisma GT Evo VI		(Finland) Juha Hellman	(Finland) Jani Laaksonen	9
(Finland) Hannu Hotanen	Mitsubishi	Lancer Carisma GT Evo VI	M	(Finland) Hannu Hotanen	(Finland) Jari Jyrkiäinen	9
(Cyprus) Andreas Peratikos	Mitsubishi	Lancer Evo III		(Cyprus) Andreas Peratikos	(Cyprus) Harris Episkopou	10
(France) Jean-Marie Santoni	Mitsubishi	Lancer Evo VI		(France) Jean-Marie Santoni	(France) Jean-Marc Casamatta	11
(Hungary) Ventile Sport Kft.	Mitsubishi	Lancer Evo V	M	(Hungary) Krisztián Hideg	(Hungary) Péter Tajnafői	11
(Italy) Ralliart Italia	Mitsubishi	Lancer Carisma GT Evo VI	P	(Italy) Alessandro Fiorio	(Italy) Enrico Cantoni	12
(Italy) Emanuele Dati	Mitsubishi	Lancer Evo V		(Italy) Emanuele Dati	(Italy) Marisa Merlin	12
(Japan) Mitsubishi Ralliart	Mitsubishi	Lancer Evo VI	M	(Australia) Ed Ordynski	(Australia) Iain Stewart	13
(France) Erik Comas	Mitsubishi	Lancer Evo VI		(France) Erik Comas	(France) Jean-Paul Terrasse	13
(Finland) Olli Harkki	Mitsubishi	Lancer Evo VI	P	(Finland) Olli Harkki	(Finland) Kari Mustalahti	14
(United Kingdom) Gavin Cox	Mitsubishi	Lancer Evo VI		(United Kingdom) Gavin Cox	(United Kingdom) Tim Hobbs	14
(United Kingdom) Jeremy Easson	Mitsubishi	Lancer Evo VI	D	(United Kingdom) Jeremy Easson	(United Kingdom) Nigel Gardner	14
(United Kingdom) David Sutton Cars Ltd	Mitsubishi	Lancer Evo VI	M	(Sweden) Stig Blomqvist	(Venezuela) Ana Goñi	14
(Japan) Team Advan Ralliart	Mitsubishi	Lancer Evo VI	Y	(Japan) Katsuhiko Taguchi	(United Kingdom) Derek Ringer	8, 13
Mitsubishi Ralliart New Zealand	Mitsubishi	Lancer Evo VI		(New Zealand) Geoff Argyle	(New Zealand) Paul Fallon	8
Mitsubishi Ralliart New Zealand	Mitsubishi	Lancer Evo VI		(New Zealand) Andrew Hawkeswood	(New Zealand) Samantha Haldane	8
(New Zealand) Rose City Cars	Mitsubishi	Lancer Evo VI		(New Zealand) Bruce Herbert	(New Zealand) Robert Ryan	8
(New Zealand) Palmerston North Motors	Mitsubishi	Lancer Evo VI		(New Zealand) Brian Green	(New Zealand) Jane McKay	8
(Cyprus) Fairways Rally Team	Mitsubishi	Lancer Evo VI	P	(Cyprus) Andreas Tsouloftas	(Cyprus) Andreas Achilleos	10
(Italy) Ralliart Italia	Mitsubishi	Lancer Evo VI	P	(Italy) Andrea Aghini	(Italy) Dario D'Esposito	12
(Argentina) Roberto Sanchez	Subaru	Impreza WRX	P	(Argentina) Roberto Sanchez	(Argentina) Rubén García	3–6
(Malaysia) Saladin Rallying	Subaru	Impreza WRX		(Malaysia) Saladin Mazlan	(Malaysia) Allen Oh	3
(Kenya) Phineas Kimathi	Subaru	Impreza WRX		(Kenya) Phineas Kimathi	(Kenya) Abdul Sidi	3
(Kenya) Shaheed Wissanji	Subaru	Impreza WRX		(Kenya) Shaheed Wissanji	(Kenya) Mohammed Verjee	3
(Argentina) Sebastián Beltrán	Subaru	Impreza WRX		(Argentina) Sebastián Beltrán	(Argentina) Gabriel Carranza	6
Subaru Rally Team Australia	Subaru	Impreza WRX		(Australia) Cody Crocker	(Australia) Greg Foletta	8, 13
(Japan) Spike Subaru Team	Subaru	Impreza WRX	P	(Japan) Toshihiro Arai	(United Kingdom) Roger Freeman	13
(United Kingdom) Nigel Heath	Subaru	Impreza 555	P	(United Kingdom) Nigel Heath	(Republic of Ireland) Chris Patterson	1
(United Kingdom) Nigel Heath	Subaru	Impreza 555	P	(United Kingdom) Nigel Heath	(United Kingdom) Jeff Ashfield	4
(Greece) Ioannis Papadimitriou	Subaru	Impreza 555		(Greece) Ioannis Papadimitriou	(Greece) Nikolaos Petropoulos	2, 6, 8, 14
(France) Pierre Colard	Subaru	Impreza 555	M	(France) Pierre Colard	(France) Gilles Mondésir	4, 7
(Malaysia) Petronas EON Racing Team	Proton	Pert	Y	(Malaysia) Karamjit Singh	(Malaysia) Allen Oh	8
(Poland) Polsat Dialog Rally Team	Toyota	Celica GT-Four ST205	M	(Poland) Tomasz Kuchar	(Poland) Maciej Szczepaniak	2, 4
(Kenya) Paul Bailey	Toyota	Celica GT-Four ST205		(Kenya) Paul Bailey	(Kenya) Raju Sehmi	3

== Results and standings ==
=== Rally results ===
Rd.	Rally	Overall winners	Teams cup Winners	Group N Cup Winners	Report
1	(Monaco) Monte Carlo	(Japan) No. 1 Marlboro Mitsubishi Ralliart	No entries	(Austria) No. 21 Stohl Racing	Report
1	(Monaco) Monte Carlo	(Japan) Mitsubishi Lancer Evo VI	N/A	(Japan) Mitsubishi Lancer Evo VI	Report
1	(Monaco) Monte Carlo	(Finland) Tommi Mäkinen (Finland) Risto Mannisenmäki	N/A	(Austria) Manfred Stohl (Austria) Peter Müller	Report
2	Sweden	(France) No. 10 Peugeot Esso	(Poland) No. 22 Wizja TV / Turning Point RT	No. 27 Mitsubishi Ralliart Finland	Report
2	Sweden	(France) Peugeot 206 WRC	(Japan) Subaru Impreza S5 WRC '99	(Japan) Mitsubishi Carisma GT Evo VI	Report
2	Sweden	(Finland) Marcus Grönholm (Finland) Timo Rautiainen	(Poland) Krzysztof Hołowczyc (Belgium) Jean-Marc Fortin	(Finland) Jani Paasonen (Finland) Jakke Honkanen	Report
3	Kenya	(Japan) No. 3 Subaru World Rally Team	(Japan) No. 17 Spike Subaru Team	(Argentina) No. 31 Claudio Marcelo Menzi	Report
3	Kenya	(Japan) Subaru Impreza S5 WRC '99	(Japan) Subaru Impreza S5 WRC '99	(Japan) Mitsubishi Lancer Evo VI	Report
3	Kenya	(United Kingdom) Richard Burns (United Kingdom) Robert Reid	(Japan) Toshihiro Arai (United Kingdom) Roger Freeman	(Argentina) Claudio Marcelo Menzi (Argentina) Edgardo Galindo	Report
4	Portugal	(Japan) No. 3 Subaru World Rally Team	(France) No. 24 F.Dor Rally Team	(Portugal) No. 37 Mitsubishi Galp	Report
4	Portugal	(Japan) Subaru Impreza S6 WRC '00	(Japan) Subaru Impreza S5 WRC '99	(Japan) Mitsubishi Carisma GT Evo VI	Report
4	Portugal	(United Kingdom) Richard Burns (United Kingdom) Robert Reid	(France) Frédéric Dor (France) Didier Breton	(Portugal) Miguel Campos (Portugal) Carlos Magalhães	Report
5	Spain	(United States) No. 5 Ford Motor Co	No. 24 Toyota Team Saudi Arabia	(Germany) No. 32 Uwe Nittel	Report
5	Spain	(United States) Ford Focus RS WRC '00	(Japan) Toyota Corolla WRC	(Japan) Mitsubishi Lancer Evo VI	Report
5	Spain	(United Kingdom) Colin McRae (United Kingdom) Nicky Grist	(Saudi Arabia) Abdullah Bakhashab (United Kingdom) Bobby Willis	(Germany) Uwe Nittel (Germany) Detlef Ruf	Report
6	Argentina	(Japan) No. 3 Subaru World Rally Team	(Turkey) No. 20 Toyota Team Atakan	(Uruguay) No. 22 Gustavo Trelles	Report
6	Argentina	(Japan) Subaru Impreza S6 WRC '00	(Japan) Toyota Corolla WRC	(Japan) Mitsubishi Lancer Evo VI	Report
6	Argentina	(United Kingdom) Richard Burns (United Kingdom) Robert Reid	(Turkey) Serkan Yazici (Turkey) Erkan Bodur	(Uruguay) Gustavo Trelles (Argentina) Jorge Del Buono	Report
7	Greece	(United States) No. 5 Ford Motor Co	(Japan) No. 23 Spike Subaru Team	(Argentina) No. 35 Gabriel Pozzo	Report
7	Greece	(United States) Ford Focus RS WRC '00	(Japan) Subaru Impreza S5 WRC '99	(Japan) Mitsubishi Lancer Evo VI	Report
7	Greece	(United Kingdom) Colin McRae (United Kingdom) Nicky Grist	(Japan) Toshihiro Arai (United Kingdom) Roger Freeman	(Argentina) Gabriel Pozzo (Argentina) Daniel Stillo	Report
8	New Zealand	(France) No. 10 Peugeot Esso	(Oman) No. 22 Arab World Rally Team	(Austria) No. 21 Stohl Racing	Report
8	New Zealand	(France) Peugeot 206 WRC	(Japan) Subaru Impreza WRX (Grp. N)	(Japan) Mitsubishi Lancer Evo VI	Report
8	New Zealand	(Finland) Marcus Grönholm (Finland) Timo Rautiainen	(Oman) Hamed Al-Wahaibi (New Zealand) Tony Sircombe	(Austria) Manfred Stohl (Austria) Peter Müller	Report
9	Finland	(France) No. 10 Peugeot Esso	No. 24 Toyota Team Saudi Arabia	No. 28 Mitsubishi Ralliart Finland	Report
9	Finland	(France) Peugeot 206 WRC	(Japan) Toyota Corolla WRC	(Japan) Mitsubishi Carisma GT Evo VI	Report
9	Finland	(Finland) Marcus Grönholm (Finland) Timo Rautiainen	(Saudi Arabia) Abdullah Bakhashab (United Kingdom) Bobby Willis	(Finland) Jani Paasonen (Finland) Jakke Honkanen	Report
10	Cyprus	(United States) No. 6 Ford Motor Co	(Japan) No. 18 Spike Subaru Team	(Uruguay) No. 25 Gustavo Trelles	Report
10	Cyprus	(United States) Ford Focus RS WRC '00	(Japan) Subaru Impreza S5 WRC '99	(Japan) Mitsubishi Lancer Evo VI	Report
10	Cyprus	(Spain) Carlos Sainz (Spain) Luis Moya	(Japan) Toshihiro Arai (United Kingdom) Roger Freeman	(Uruguay) Gustavo Trelles (Argentina) Jorge Del Buono	Report
11	France	(France) No. 10 Peugeot Esso	(Oman) No. 20 Arab World Rally Team	(Austria) No. 37 Stohl Racing	Report
11	France	(France) Peugeot 206 WRC	(Japan) Subaru Impreza S5 WRC '99	(Japan) Mitsubishi Lancer Evo VI	Report
11	France	(France) Gilles Panizzi (France) Herve Panizzi	(Oman) Hamed Al-Wahaibi (New Zealand) Tony Sircombe	(Austria) Manfred Stohl (Austria) Peter Müller	Report
12	Italy	(France) No. 10 Peugeot Esso	(Turkey) No. 29 Toyota Team Atakan	(Italy) No. 37 Vieffe Corse SRL	Report
12	Italy	(France) Peugeot 206 WRC	(Japan) Toyota Corolla WRC	(Japan) Mitsubishi Lancer Evo VI	Report
12	Italy	(France) Gilles Panizzi (France) Herve Panizzi	(Turkey) Serkan Yazici (Turkey) Erkan Bodur	(Italy) Gianluigi Galli (Italy) Maurizio Messina	Report
13	Australia	(France) No. 10 Peugeot Esso	(Turkey) No. 25 Toyota Team Atakan	(Uruguay) No. 30 Gustavo Trelles	Report
13	Australia	(France) Peugeot 206 WRC	(Japan) Toyota Corolla WRC	(Japan) Mitsubishi Lancer Evo VI	Report
13	Australia	(Finland) Marcus Grönholm (Finland) Timo Rautiainen	(Turkey) Serkan Yazici (Turkey) Erkan Bodur	(Uruguay) Gustavo Trelles (Argentina) Jorge Del Buono	Report
14	(United Kingdom) Britain	(Japan) No. 3 Subaru World Rally Team	(Oman) No. 36 Arab World Rally Team	(Austria) No. 30 Stohl Racing	Report
14	(United Kingdom) Britain	(Japan) Subaru Impreza S6 WRC '00	(Japan) Subaru Impreza S5 WRC '99	(Japan) Mitsubishi Lancer Evo VI	Report
14	(United Kingdom) Britain	(United Kingdom) Richard Burns (United Kingdom) Robert Reid	(Oman) Hamed Al-Wahaibi (New Zealand) Tony Sircombe	(Austria) Manfred Stohl (Austria) Peter Müller	Report

=== Drivers' championship ===
Pos.	Driver	MON (Monaco)	SWE (Sweden)	KEN (Kenya)	POR (Portugal)	ESP (Spain)	ARG (Argentina)	GRE (Greece)	NZL (New Zealand)	FIN (Finland)	CYP (Cyprus)	FRA (France)	ITA (Italy)	AUS (Australia)	GBR (United Kingdom)	Pts
1	(Finland) Marcus Grönholm	Ret	1	Ret	2	5	2	Ret	1	1	Ret	5	4	1	2	65
2	(United Kingdom) Richard Burns	Ret	5	1	1	2	1	Ret	Ret	Ret	4	4	Ret	2	1	60
3	(Spain) Carlos Sainz	2	Ret	4	3	3	Ret	2	3	14	1	3	5	DSQ	4	46
4	(United Kingdom) Colin McRae	Ret	3	Ret	Ret	1	Ret	1	2	2	2	Ret	6	Ret	Ret	43
5	(Finland) Tommi Mäkinen	1	2	Ret	Ret	4	3	Ret	Ret	4	5	Ret	3	DSQ	3	36
6	(France) François Delecour	Ret	7		5	7	13	9	Ret	6	3	2	2	3	6	24
7	(France) Gilles Panizzi	Ret		Ret		6						1	1	Ret	8	21
8	(Finland) Juha Kankkunen	3	6	2	Ret	Ret	4	3	Ret	8	7			Ret	5	20
9	(Finland) Harri Rovanperä		12		4					3					10	7
10	(Norway) Petter Solberg			5	Ret		6	Ret	4	Ret	DNS	Ret	9	Ret	Ret	6
11	(Sweden) Kenneth Eriksson		13		Ret	23	8	Ret	5	15		Ret	45	4	Ret	5
12	(France) Didier Auriol	Ret	10	3	10	13	Ret	Ret	Ret	11	Ret	8	17	8	9	4
13	(Japan) Toshihiro Arai			6		16		4	Ret		9			13	Ret	4
14	(Finland) Toni Gardemeister	4	Ret	Ret	9	Ret	Ret	Ret	Ret	Ret	Ret	11	Ret	6	12	4
15	(Belgium) Freddy Loix	6	8	Ret	6	8	5	Ret	Ret	Ret	8	Ret	8	Ret	Ret	4
16	(Sweden) Thomas Rådström		4		Ret											3
17	(Belgium) Bruno Thiry	5														2
18	(Germany) Armin Schwarz	7		7	8	11		5			Ret		12		13	2
19	(Finland) Sebastian Lindholm									5						2
20	(Finland) Tapio Laukkanen									Ret				5	Ret	2
21	(Saudi Arabia) Abdullah Bakhashab		27		Ret	15		6		28	Ret		44			1
22	(New Zealand) Possum Bourne								6					7		1
23	(Estonia) Markko Märtin		9		7	10		Ret		10	6		Ret	Ret	7	1
24	(Italy) Piero Liatti											6	Ret			1
Pos.	Driver	MON (Monaco)	SWE (Sweden)	KEN (Kenya)	POR (Portugal)	ESP (Spain)	ARG (Argentina)	GRE (Greece)	NZL (New Zealand)	FIN (Finland)	CYP (Cyprus)	FRA (France)	ITA (Italy)	AUS (Australia)	GBR (United Kingdom)	Pts

Key
Colour	Result
Gold	Winner
Silver	2nd place
Bronze	3rd place
Green	Points finish
Blue	Non-points finish
Blue	Non-classified finish (NC)
Purple	Did not finish (Ret)
Black	Excluded (EX)
Black	Disqualified (DSQ)
White	Did not start (DNS)
White	Cancelled (C)
Blank	Withdrew entry from the event (WD)

=== Manufacturers' championship ===
Pos.	Manufacturer	No.	MON (Monaco)	SWE (Sweden)	KEN (Kenya)	POR (Portugal)	ESP (Spain)	ARG (Argentina)	GRE (Greece)	NZL (New Zealand)	FIN (Finland)	CYP (Cyprus)	FRA (France)	ITA (Italy)	AUS (Australia)	GBR (United Kingdom)	Points
1	(France) Peugeot Esso	9	Ret	6	Ret	4	6	8	5	Ret	4	3	2	2	3	6	111
1	(France) Peugeot Esso	10	Ret	1	Ret	2	5	2	Ret	1	1	Ret	1	1	1	2	111
2	(United Kingdom) Ford Motor Co	5	Ret	3	Ret	Ret	1	Ret	1	2	2	2	Ret	5	Ret	Ret	91
2	(United Kingdom) Ford Motor Co	6	2	Ret	4	3	3	Ret	2	3	8	1	3	4	Ret	4	91
3	(Japan) Subaru World Rally Team	3	Ret	4	1	1	2	1	Ret	Ret	Ret	4	4	Ret	2	1	88
3	(Japan) Subaru World Rally Team	4	3	5	2	Ret	Ret	4	3	Ret	5	6	5	6	Ret	5	88
4	(Japan) Marlboro Mitsubishi Ralliart	1	1	2	Ret	Ret	4	3	Ret	Ret	3	5	Ret	3	Ret	3	43
4	(Japan) Marlboro Mitsubishi Ralliart	2	5	7	Ret	5	7	5	Ret	Ret	Ret	7	Ret	7	Ret	Ret	43
5	(Spain) SEAT Sport	7	Ret	8	3	8	9	Ret	Ret	Ret	7	Ret	6	11	6	7	11
5	(Spain) SEAT Sport	8	4	Ret	Ret	7	Ret	Ret	Ret	Ret	Ret	Ret	7	Ret	5	9	11
6	(South Korea) Hyundai World Rally Team	14		9		Ret	10	7	Ret	4	9		Ret	12	4	Ret	8
6	(South Korea) Hyundai World Rally Team	15		10		Ret	Ret	6	Ret	Ret	6		8	10	Ret	8	8
7	(Czech Republic) Škoda Motorsport	11	6		5	6	8		4			Ret		8		10	8
7	(Czech Republic) Škoda Motorsport	12	7		6	9	Ret		Ret			Ret		9		11	8
Pos.	Manufacturer	No.	MON (Monaco)	SWE (Sweden)	KEN (Kenya)	POR (Portugal)	ESP (Spain)	ARG (Argentina)	GRE (Greece)	NZL (New Zealand)	FIN (Finland)	CYP (Cyprus)	FRA (France)	ITA (Italy)	AUS (Australia)	GBR (United Kingdom)	Points

Key
Colour	Result
Gold	Winner
Silver	2nd place
Bronze	3rd place
Green	Points finish
Blue	Non-points finish
Blue	Non-classified finish (NC)
Purple	Did not finish (Ret)
Black	Excluded (EX)
Black	Disqualified (DSQ)
White	Did not start (DNS)
White	Cancelled (C)
Blank	Withdrew entry from the event (WD)

=== FIA Teams Cup ===
Pos.	Driver	MON (Monaco)	SWE (Sweden)	KEN (Kenya)	POR (Portugal)	ESP (Spain)	ARG (Argentina)	GRE (Greece)	NZL (New Zealand)	FIN (Finland)	CYP (Cyprus)	FRA (France)	ITA (Italy)	AUS (Australia)	GBR (United Kingdom)	Pts
1	(Japan) Toshihiro Arai			1		2		1	Ret		1			2	Ret	42
2	(Saudi Arabia) Abdullah Bakhashab		2		Ret	1		2		1	Ret		2			38
3	(Turkey) Serkan Yazici				Ret	Ret	1	4				Ret	1	1		33
4	(France) Frédéric Dor			Ret	1		2	3		2	Ret				2	32
NC	(Oman) Hamed Al-Wahaibi							Ret	1	Ret		1	Ret		1	30
NC	(Poland) Krzysztof Hołowczyc		1		Ret		Ret	Ret			Ret					10
Pos.	Driver	MON (Monaco)	SWE (Sweden)	KEN (Kenya)	POR (Portugal)	ESP (Spain)	ARG (Argentina)	GRE (Greece)	NZL (New Zealand)	FIN (Finland)	CYP (Cyprus)	FRA (France)	ITA (Italy)	AUS (Australia)	GBR (United Kingdom)	Pts

Key
Colour	Result
Gold	Winner
Silver	2nd place
Bronze	3rd place
Green	Points finish
Blue	Non-points finish
Blue	Non-classified finish (NC)
Purple	Did not finish (Ret)
Black	Excluded (EX)
Black	Disqualified (DSQ)
White	Did not start (DNS)
White	Cancelled (C)
Blank	Withdrew entry from the event (WD)

=== Production World Rally championship ===
Pos.	Driver	MON (Monaco)	SWE (Sweden)	KEN (Kenya)	POR (Portugal)	ESP (Spain)	ARG (Argentina)	GRE (Greece)	NZL (New Zealand)	FIN (Finland)	CYP (Cyprus)	FRA (France)	ITA (Italy)	AUS (Australia)	GBR (United Kingdom)	Pts
1	(Austria) Manfred Stohl	1	4	3	2	3	Ret	3	1	3	4	1	4	3	1	75
2	(Uruguay) Gustavo Trelles	2			Ret	2	1	2	2	Ret	1	2	3	1	11	64
3	(Argentina) Gabriel Pozzo			Ret	Ret	10	2	1		Ret	2	11	Ret	10		22
4	(Finland) Jani Paasonen		1			6				1				Ret		21
5	(Argentina) Claudio Marcelo Menzi			1	Ret	5	Ret	Ret		Ret	3	9	Ret	6		17
6	(Peru) Ramón Ferreyros				3	Ret	4	4				5	5		4	17
7	(Italy) Gianluigi Galli	3	8		Ret					9		Ret	1			14
8	(Portugal) Miguel Campos				1	4										13
9	(Finland) Juuso Pykälistö		2							2						12
10	(Germany) Uwe Nittel	Ret			Ret	1		Ret								10
11	(Argentina) Roberto Sanchez			2	Ret	9	3									10
12	(Sweden) Kenneth Bäcklund		6							Ret					2	7
13	(Italy) Alex Fiorio												2			6
14	(Japan) Toshihiro Arai													2		6
15	(New Zealand) Reece Jones								3			Ret		Ret	8	4
16	(Sweden) Stig-Olov Walfridsson		3													4
17	(France) Jean-Marie Santoni											3				4
18	(Finland) Olli Harkki														3	4
Pos.	Driver	MON (Monaco)	SWE (Sweden)	KEN (Kenya)	POR (Portugal)	ESP (Spain)	ARG (Argentina)	GRE (Greece)	NZL (New Zealand)	FIN (Finland)	CYP (Cyprus)	FRA (France)	ITA (Italy)	AUS (Australia)	GBR (United Kingdom)	Pts

Key
Colour	Result
Gold	Winner
Silver	2nd place
Bronze	3rd place
Green	Points finish
Blue	Non-points finish
Blue	Non-classified finish (NC)
Purple	Did not finish (Ret)
Black	Excluded (EX)
Black	Disqualified (DSQ)
White	Did not start (DNS)
White	Cancelled (C)
Blank	Withdrew entry from the event (WD)

== Events ==
Rally Name	Start-End Date	Podium Drivers (Finishing Time)	Podium Cars
(Monaco) Monte Carlo Rally	21 January–23 January	1. (Finland) Tommi Mäkinen (4h:23m:35.8s); 2. (Spain) Carlos Sainz (4h:25m:00.7s); 3. (Finland) Juha Kankkunen (4h:26m:57.2s)	1. Mitsubishi Lancer Evo 6; 2. Ford Focus RS WRC 00; 3. Subaru Impreza WRC 99
(Sweden) Swedish Rally	11 February–13 February	1. (Finland) Marcus Grönholm (3h:20m:33.3s); 2. (Finland) Tommi Mäkinen (3h:20m:40.1s); 3. (United Kingdom) Colin McRae (3h:20m:47.0s)	1. Peugeot 206 WRC; 2. Mitsubishi Lancer Evo 6; 3. Ford Focus RS WRC 00
(Kenya) Safari Rally	25 March–27 March	1. (United Kingdom) Richard Burns (8h:33m:13s); 2. (Finland) Juha Kankkunen (8h:37m:50s); 3. (France) Didier Auriol (8h:55m:57s)	1. Subaru Impreza WRC 99; 2. Subaru Impreza WRC 99; 3. SEAT Córdoba WRC E2
Rally Portugal	16 March–19 March	1. (United Kingdom) Richard Burns (4h:34m:00.0s); 2. (Finland) Marcus Grönholm (4h:34m:06.5s); 3. (Spain) Carlos Sainz (4h:36m:09.2s)	1. Subaru Impreza WRC 00; 2. Peugeot 206 WRC; 3. Ford Focus RS WRC 00
(Spain) Rally Catalunya	31 March–2 April	1. (United Kingdom) Colin McRae (4h:07m:13.0s); 2. (United Kingdom) Richard Burns (4h:07m:18.9s); 3. (Spain) Carlos Sainz (4h:07m:24.7s)	1. Ford Focus RS WRC 00; 2. Subaru Impreza WRC 00; 3. Ford Focus RS WRC 00
Rally Argentina	11 May–14 May	1. (United Kingdom) Richard Burns (4h:10m:20.7s); 2. (Finland) Marcus Grönholm (4h:11m:28.1s); 3. (Finland) Tommi Mäkinen (4h:11m:52.3s)	1. Subaru Impreza WRC 00; 2. Peugeot 206 WRC; 3. Mitsubishi Lancer Evo 6
(Greece) Acropolis Rally	9 June–11 June	1. (United Kingdom) Colin McRae (4h:56m:54.8s); 2. (Spain) Carlos Sainz (4h:57:17.9s); 3. (Finland) Juha Kankkunen (5h:03m:33.1s)	1. Ford Focus RS WRC 00; 2. Ford Focus RS WRC 00; 3. Subaru Impreza WRC 00
Rally New Zealand	14 July–16 July	1. (Finland) Marcus Grönholm (3h:45m:13.4s); 2. (United Kingdom) Colin McRae (3h:45m:27.9s); 3. (Spain) Carlos Sainz (3h:46m:31.8s)	1. Peugeot 206 WRC; 2. Ford Focus RS WRC 00; 3. Ford Focus RS WRC 00
Rally Finland	18 August–20 August	1. (Finland) Marcus Grönholm (3h:22m:37.1s); 2. (United Kingdom) Colin McRae (3h:23m:43.3s); 3. (Finland) Harri Rovanperä (3h:23m:46.7s)	1. Peugeot 206 WRC; 2. Ford Focus RS WRC 00; 3. Toyota Corolla WRC
Cyprus Rally	7 September–10 September	1. (Spain) Carlos Sainz (5h:26m:04.9s); 2. (United Kingdom) Colin McRae (5h:26m:42.2s); 3. (France) François Delecour (5h:27m:35.7s)	1. Ford Focus RS WRC 00; 2. Ford Focus RS WRC 00; 3. Peugeot 206 WRC
(France) Tour de Corse	29 September–1 October	1. (France) Gilles Panizzi (4h:02m:14.2s); 2. (France) François Delecour (4h:02m:47.7s); 3. (Spain) Carlos Sainz (4h:03m:26.8s)	1. Peugeot 206 WRC; 2. Peugeot 206 WRC; 3. Ford Focus RS WRC 00
(Italy) Rally Sanremo	20 October–22 October	1. (France) Gilles Panizzi (3h:52m:14.2s); 2. (France) François Delecour (3h:52m:24.1s); 3. (Finland) Tommi Mäkinen (3h:53m:00.3s)	1. Peugeot 206 WRC; 2. Peugeot 206 WRC; 3. Mitsubishi Lancer Evo 6
Rally Australia	9 November–12 November	1. (Finland) Marcus Grönholm (3h:43m:57.2s); 2. (United Kingdom) Richard Burns (3h:43m:59.9s); 3. (France) François Delecour (3h:45m:30.1s)	1. Peugeot 206 WRC; 2. Subaru Impreza WRC 00; 3. Peugeot 206 WRC
(United Kingdom) Rally of Great Britain	23 November–26 November	1. (United Kingdom) Richard Burns (3h:43m:01.9s); 2. (Finland) Marcus Grönholm (3h:44m:07.5s); 3. (Finland) Tommi Mäkinen (3h:44m:16.9s)	1. Subaru Impreza WRC 00; 2. Peugeot 206 WRC; 3. Mitsubishi Lancer Evo 6
