= 2000 Tour de Corse =

2000 Tour de Corse 44th V-Rally Tour de Corse - Rallye de France
Round 11 of the 2000 World Rally Championship season
← Previous event	Next event →
- Host country: France
- Rally base: Ajaccio
- Dates run: September 29, 2000 – October 1, 2000
- Length: 385.01 km (239.23 miles)
- Stage surface: Asphalt

Statistics
- Crews: 121 at start, 80 at finish

Overall results
- Overall winner: (France) Gilles Panizzi (France) Peugeot Esso; Peugeot 206 WRC

The 2000 Tour de Corse (formally the 44th V-Rally Tour de Corse - Rallye de France) was the 11th round of the 2000 World Rally Championship. The race was held over three days between 29 September and 1 October 2000. Peugeot's Gilles Panizzi won the race, his 1st win in the World Rally Championship.

== Itinerary ==
All dates and times are CEST (UTC+2)

Date	Time	No.	Stage name	Distance
29 Sep	09:08	SS1	Vero - Pont d'Azzana 1	18.22 km
29 Sep	09:56	SS2	Lopigna - Sarrola 1	29.96 km
29 Sep	12:04	SS3	Bellevalle - Pietra 1	20.84 km
29 Sep	12:49	SS4	Filitosa - Bicchisan 1	22.47 km
29 Sep	15:02	SS5	Cuttoli - Peri 1	17.34 km
29 Sep	15:40	SS6	Gare de Carbuccia 1	17.25 km
Leg 1 total: 126.08 km
30 Sep	09:48	SS7	Morosaglia - Campile	31.91 km
30 Sep	11:01	SS8	Taverna - Pont de Ca	16.14 km
30 Sep	12:53	SS9	Noceta - Muracciole	16.60 km
30 Sep	13:51	SS10	Feo - Col San Quilic	22.54 km
30 Sep	15:52	SS11	Pont St Laurent	26.44 km
30 Sep	16:40	SS12	Feo - Altiani	16.52 km
Leg 2 total: 130.15 km
1 Oct	07:38	SS13	Vero - Pont d'Azzana 2	18.22 km
1 Oct	08:26	SS14	Lopigna - Sarrola 2	29.96 km
1 Oct	10:34	SS15	Bellevalle - Pietra 2	20.84 km
1 Oct	11:19	SS16	Filitosa - Bicchisan 2	22.47 km
1 Oct	13:32	SS17	Cuttoli - Peri 2	17.25 km
1 Oct	14:10	SS18	Gare de Carbuccia 2	20.04 km
Leg 3 total: 128.78 km
Rally total: 385.01 km

== Results ==
Position	No.	Driver	Co-driver	Car	Time	Difference
1	10	(France) Gilles Panizzi	(France) Hervé Panizzi	Peugeot 206 WRC	4:02:14.2	+-0:00
2	9	(France) François Delecour	(France) Daniel Grataloup	Peugeot 206 WRC	4:02:47.7	+33:5
3	6	(Spain) Carlos Sainz Sr.	(Spain) Luis Moya	Ford Focus WRC '00	4:03:26.8	+1:12.6
4	3	(United Kingdom) Richard Burns	(United Kingdom) Robert Reid	Subaru Impreza S6 WRC '00	4:03:45.1	+1:30.9
5	16	(Finland) Marcus Grönholm	(Finland) Timo Rautiainen	Peugeot 206 WRC	4:04:11.3	+1:57.1
6	17	(Italy) Piero Liatti	(Italy) Carlo Cassina	Ford Focus WRC '00	4:05:08:0	+2:53.8
7	4	(France) Simon Jean-Joseph	(France) Jack Boyére	Subaru Impreza S6 WRC '00	4:05:23.7	+3:09.5
8	7	(France) Didier Auriol	(France) Denis Giraudet	SEAT Córdoba WRC Evo3	4:05:44.9	+3:30.7
9	33	(France) Sébastien Loeb	(Monaco) Daniel Elena	Toyota Corolla WRC	4:09:07.4	+6:53.2
10	39	(France) Fabrice Morel	(France) David Marty	Peugeot 206 WRC	4:09:34.6	+7:20.4
11	8	(Finland) Toni Gardemeister	(Finland) Paavo Lukander	SEAT Córdoba WRC Evo3	4:09:34.7	+7:20.5
12	15	(United Kingdom) Alister McRae	(United Kingdom) David Senior	Hyundai Accent WRC	4:11:14.9	+9:00.7
13	32	(France) Benoît Rousselot	(France) Xavier Panseri	Renault Mégane Maxi	4:13:51.3	+11:37.1
14	20	(Oman) Hamed Al-Wahaibi	(New Zealand) Tony Sircombe	Subaru Impreza S5 WRC '99	4:17:04.9	+14:50.7
15	45	(France) Jean-Pierre Manzagol	(France) Sabrina De Castelli	Peugeot 306 Maxi	4:17:53.3	+15:39.1
16	28	(France) Philippe Bugalski	(France) Jean-Paul Chiaroni	Citroën Saxo Kit Car	4:22:13.1	+19:58.9
17	37	(Austria) Manfred Stohl	(Austria) Peter Müller	Mitsubishi Lancer Evo VI	4:22:28.0	+20:13.8
18	22	(Uruguay) Gustavo Trelles	(Argentina) Jorge Del Buono	Mitsubishi Lancer Evo VI	4:23:00.6	+20:46.4
19	44	(France) Armando Pereira	(France) Jean-Jacques Ferrero	Subaru Impreza S5 WRC '99	4:24:59.9	+22:45.7
20	48	(France) Jean-Marie Santoni	(France) Jean-Marc Casamatta	Mitsubishi Lancer Evo VI	4:25:33.3	+23:19.1
21	54	(Hungary) Krisztián Hideg	(Hungary) Peter Tajnafői	Mitsubishi Lancer Evo VI	4:26:00.5	+23:46.3
22	24	(Peru) Ramón Ferreyros	(Spain) Diego Vallejo	Mitsubishi Lancer Evo VI	4:26:02.0	+23:47.8
23	47	(France) Philippe Rognoni	(France) Etienne Patrone	Mitsubishi Lancer Evo VI	4:26:16.2	+24:02.0
24	57	(France) Petru Francescu Fazi	(France) Xavier Pierlovisi	Mitsubishi Lancer Evo VI	4:27:302.	+25:16.0
25	25	(Uruguay) Gabriel Méndez	(Uruguay) Daniel Muzio	Mitsubishi Lancer Evo VI	4:27:51.0	+25:36.8
26	27	(Argentina) Claudio Marcelo Menzi	(Argentina) Edgardo Galindo	Mitsubishi Lancer Evo VI	4:29:11.2	+26:57.0
27	62	(France) Paul-André Mariani	(France) Louis Mariani	Mitsubishi Lancer Evo VI	4:31:03.7	+28:49.5
28	30	(Spain) Jesús Puras	(Spain) Marc Martí	Citroën Saxo Kit Car	4:32:29.0	+30:14.8
29	26	(Argentina) Gabriel Pozzo	(Argentina) Fabian Cretu	Mitsubishi Lancer Evo VI	4:33:09.8	+30:55.6
30	53	(France) Jean-Paul Aymé	(France) Brigitte Aymé	Mitsubishi Lancer Evo VI	4:39:13.1	+36:58.9
31	51	(Belgium) Bob Colsoul	(Belgium) Tom Colsoul	Mitsubishi Lancer Evo V	4:40:54.2	+38:40.0
32	60	(France) Jean-Marc Sanchez	(France) Jean-François Scelo	Subaru Impreza GT Turbo	4:41:46.1	+39:31.9
33	49	(United Kingdom) Natalie Barratt	(United Kingdom) Roger Freeman	Mitsubishi Lancer Evo VI	4:43:00.2	+40:46.0
34	78	(Italy) Silvano Pintarelli	(Italy) Andrea Tumaini	Opel Corsa GSi	4:45:50.0	+43:25.8
35	91	(France) Aimé Védrines	(France) Philippe Eustaquio	Citroën Xsara VTS	4:45:44.8	+43:30.6
36	35	(France) Serge Amorotti	(France) Hervé Amorotti	Ford Escort RS Cosworth	4:46:56.6	+44:42.4
37	77	(France) Bruno Zonta	(France) Roger Lassalle	Peugeot 106 S16	4:47:40.0	+45:25.8
38	63	(France) Frédéric Schmit	(France) Christophe Schmit	Mitsubishi Lancer Evo VI	4:47:45.0	+45:30.8
39	99	(France) Tony Tavares	(France) Gilled De Turckheim	Renault Clio Williams	4:48:34.9	+46:20.7
40	46	(France) José Micheli	(France) Marie-Josée Cardi	Ford Escort RS Cosworth	4:48:43.8	+46:29.6
41	83	(France) Philippe Giovanni	(France) Patrick Santoni	Peugeot 106 S16	4:48:47.0	+46:32.8
42	89	(France) Antoine Paul Bastellica	(France) Patrick Mias	Renault Clio Williams	4:50:25.8	+48:11.6
43	95	(France) Jean-François Faillace	(France) Sandrine Faillace	Peugeot 306 S16	4:50:31.9	+48:17.7
44	66	(France) François Couchet	(France) Anne Perraudin	BMW 325i E36	4:50:41.9	+48:27.7
45	88	(France) Régis Triboulet	(France) James Boisset	Peugeot 306 S16	4:52:20.5	+50:06.3
46	102	(France) Jérôme Galvez	(France) Jean-Paul Cayuela	Peugeot 306 S16	4:52:57.8	+50:43.6
47	81	(France) Stéphane Abbati	(France) Thierry Abbati	Peugeot 306 S16	4:53:07.9	+50:53.7
48	82	(France) Dominique Leonetti	(France) Francis Mazotti	Peugeot 306 S16	4:53:19.0	+51:04.8
49	59	(Italy) Fabio Frisiero	(Italy) Simone Scattolin	Mitsubishi Lancer Evo V	4:54:02.0	+51:47.8
50	117	(France) Walter Ferrucci	(France) Christophe Dominici	Peugeot 106 Rallye	4:55:20.3	+53:06.1
51	113	(Germany) Niklas Birr	(Germany) Michael Schwendy	Citroën Saxo Kit Car	4:57:34.4	+55:20.2
52	118	(France) Daniel Mouvand	(France) Fabrice Ploncard	Honda Civic VTi (EG6)	4:58:12.0	+55:57.8
53	58	(Japan) Wakujiro Kobayashi	(Japan) Daisuke Takahashi	Mitsubishi Lancer Evo V	4:59:16.1	+57:01.9
54	108	(France) Jean-Louis Del Volgo	(France) Phillipe Pla	Nissan Micra	4:59:39.9	+57:25.7
55	90	(France) Jean-Michel Bourgeois	(France) Gilbert Andreani	Peugeot 306 Rallye	4:59:46.7	+57:32.5
56	96	(France) Jacques Richaud	(France) Roland Bonnefoy	Honda Integra Type-R	5:00:22.6	+58:08.4
57	94	(France) Didier Vellutini	(France) Paul Biggi	Renault Clio 16S	5:01:16.0	+59:01.8
58	97	(France) Paul Saly	(France) Guy Pujol	Renault Clio Williams	5:02:04.3	+59:50.1
59	112	(France) Jean-Marc Poisson	(France) Olivier Lesigne	Honda Civic VTi	5:02:07.5	+59:53.3
60	69	(Italy) Gisella Rovegno	(Italy) Veruschka De Pellegrin	Renault Clio Williams	5:02:19.5	+1:00:05.3
61	105	(France) Jean-Luc Mondoloni	(France) Amedeo Deiana	Peugeot 106 XSi	5:02:37.2	+1:00:23.0
62	122	(France) Gilles Caridroit	(France) Sébastien Bernard	Peugeot 106 Rallye	5:03:50.8	+1:01:36.6
63	116	(France) Eric Dewerdt	(France) Stéphane Brunier	Peugeot 106 XSi	5:03:54.7	+1:01:40.5
64	87	(France) Francis Leymarie	(France) Patrick Vieux-Rochat	Peugeot 306 S16	5:04:46.1	+1:02:31.9
65	68	(France) Pierrot Partal	(France) Jean-Charles Pianelli	Citroën Xsara VTS	5:05:37.0	+1:03:22.8
66	127	(France) Jacques Boudinet	(France) Serge Martinato	Peugeot 106 Rallye	5:06:37.7	+1:04:23.5
67	70	(France) Bernard Jaussaud	(France) Alain Bertrand	Renault Clio Williams	5:07:17.9	+1:05:03.7
68	120	(United Kingdom) Nicholas Kennedy	(United Kingdom) Linda Whitmore	Volkswagen Polo 16V	5:08:11.7	+1:05:57.5
69	110	(France) Patrick Cormenier	(France) Thierry Bodit	Peugeot 106 Rallye	5:08:45.0	+1:06:30.8
70	121	(France) Louis Secchi	(France) Patrick Marcheschi	Peugeot 106 Rallye	5:10:48.4	+1:08:34.2
71	106	(France) Roland Marco	(France) Valere Pellini	Peugeot 106 XSi	5:11:01.7	+1:08:47.5
72	111	(France) Jean Philippe du Fayet de la Tour	(France) Thierry Dard	Honda Civic VTi	5:11:58.8	+1:09:44.6
73	125	(Germany) Florian Schmidt	(Germany) Andreas Schwalie	Peugeot 106 Rallye	5:13:39.4	+1:11:25.2
74	73	(France) Julien Barbolosi	(France) Pierre Poli	Peugeot 306 Maxi	5:16:00.7	+1:13:46.5
75	115	(France) Jean-François Pietri	(France) Patrick Secchi	Peugeot 106 Rallye	5:16:17.9	+1:14:03.7
76	128	(France) Franck Vallette	(France) Pascal Seddaiu	Peugeot 106 Rallye	5:17:13.5	+1:14:59.3
77	80	(Italy) Andrea Pezzato	(Italy) Matteo Da Ros	Opel Corsa GSi	5:17:30.6	+1:15:16.4
78	79	(France) Edmond Fiori	(France) Karine Saidi	Peugeot 106 S16	5:22:02.2	+1:19:48.0
79	119	(France) Paul-Louis Ristori	(France) Lucie Paoli	Peugeot 106 Rallye	5:27:45.1	+1:25:30.9
80	109	(France) Bertrand Diperi	(France) Eric Yvernault	Citroën AX GTI	6:00:51.9	+1:58:37.7
