= 2000 Acropolis Rally =

7th round of the 2000 World Rally Championship

2000 Acropolis Rally 47th Acropolis Rally
Round 7 of the 2000 World Rally Championship season
← Previous event	Next event →
- Host country: Greece
- Rally base: Athens
- Dates run: June 9 2000 – June 11 2000
- Stages: 19 (390.27 km; 242.50 miles)
- Stage surface: Gravel
- Overall distance: 1,407.56 km (874.62 miles)

Statistics
- Crews: 117 at start, 48 at finish

Overall results
- Overall winner: (United Kingdom) Colin McRae (United Kingdom) Nicky Grist (United Kingdom) Ford Motor Co. Ltd. Ford Focus RS WRC '00

The 2000 Acropolis Rally (formally the 47th Acropolis Rally) was the seventh round of the 2000 World Rally Championship. The race was held over three days between 9 June and 11 June 2000, and was won by Ford's Colin McRae, his 20th win in the World Rally Championship.

== Background ==
=== Entry list ===
No.	Driver	Co-Driver	Entrant	Car	Tyre
World Rally Championship manufacturer entries
1	(Finland) Tommi Mäkinen	(Finland) Risto Mannisenmäki	(Japan) Marlboro Mitsubishi Ralliart	Mitsubishi Lancer Evo VI	MI
2	(Belgium) Freddy Loix	(Belgium) Sven Smeets	(Japan) Marlboro Mitsubishi Ralliart	Mitsubishi Carisma GT Evo VI	MI
3	(United Kingdom) Richard Burns	(United Kingdom) Robert Reid	(Japan) Subaru World Rally Team	Subaru Impreza S6 WRC '00	P
4	(Finland) Juha Kankkunen	(Finland) Juha Repo	(Japan) Subaru World Rally Team	Subaru Impreza S6 WRC '00	P
5	(United Kingdom) Colin McRae	(United Kingdom) Nicky Grist	(United Kingdom) Ford Motor Co. Ltd.	Ford Focus RS WRC '00	MI
6	(Spain) Carlos Sainz	(Spain) Luis Moya	(United Kingdom) Ford Motor Co. Ltd.	Ford Focus RS WRC '00	MI
7	(France) Didier Auriol	(France) Denis Giraudet	(Spain) SEAT Sport	SEAT Córdoba WRC Evo2	P
8	(Finland) Toni Gardemeister	(Finland) Paavo Lukander	(Spain) SEAT Sport	SEAT Córdoba WRC Evo2	P
9	(France) François Delecour	(France) Daniel Grataloup	(France) Peugeot Esso	Peugeot 206 WRC	MI
10	(Finland) Marcus Grönholm	(Finland) Timo Rautiainen	(France) Peugeot Esso	Peugeot 206 WRC	MI
11	(Germany) Armin Schwarz	(Germany) Manfred Hiemer	(Czech Republic) Škoda Motorsport	Škoda Octavia WRC	MI
12	(Spain) Luis Climent Asensio	(Spain) Álex Romaní	(Czech Republic) Škoda Motorsport	Škoda Octavia WRC	MI
14	(Sweden) Kenneth Eriksson	(Sweden) Staffan Parmander	(South Korea) Hyundai Castrol World Rally Team	Hyundai Accent WRC	MI
15	(United Kingdom) Alister McRae	(United Kingdom) David Senior	(South Korea) Hyundai Castrol World Rally Team	Hyundai Accent WRC	MI
World Rally Championship entries
16	(Norway) Petter Solberg	(United Kingdom) Phil Mills	(United Kingdom) Ford Motor Co. Ltd.	Ford Focus RS WRC '00	MI
17	(Estonia) Markko Märtin	(United Kingdom) Michael Park	(Estonia) Lukoil EOS Rally Team	Toyota Corolla WRC	MI
18	(Greece) Ioannis Papadimitriou	(Greece) Nikolaos Petropoulos	(Greece) Ioannis Papadimitriou	Subaru Impreza S5 WRC '99	MI
19	(Greece) Leonídas Kirkos	(Greece) Giorgos Polizois	(Greece) Leonídas Kirkos	Ford Escort WRC	—N/a
20	(Poland) Krzysztof Hołowczyc	(Belgium) Jean-Marc Fortin	(Poland) Wizja TV / Turning Point RT	Subaru Impreza S5 WRC '99	MI
21	(Greece) Armodios Vovos	(Greece) Spiros Koltsidas	(Greece) Toyota Hellas	Toyota Corolla WRC	—N/a
22	(Monaco) Jean-Pierre Richelmi	(France) Thierry Barjou	(Italy) Procar Rally Team	Subaru Impreza S5 WRC '99	—N/a
23	(Japan) Toshihiro Arai	(United Kingdom) Roger Freeman	(Japan) Spike Subaru Team	Subaru Impreza S5 WRC '99	—N/a
24	(Oman) Hamed Al-Wahaibi	(New Zealand) Tony Sircombe	(Oman) Arab World Rally Team	Subaru Impreza S5 WRC '99	—N/a
25	(Saudi Arabia) Abdullah Bakhashab	(United Kingdom) Bobby Willis	Toyota Team Saudi Arabia	Toyota Corolla WRC	MI
26	(France) Frédéric Dor	(France) Kevin Gormley	(France) F. Dor Rally Team	Subaru Impreza S5 WRC '99	—N/a
27	(Turkey) Serkan Yazici	(Turkey) Erkan Bodur	(Turkey) Team Atakan	Toyota Corolla WRC	—N/a
31	(France) Pierre Colard	(France) Gilles Mondésir	(France) Pierre Colard	Subaru Impreza 555	—N/a
39	(United Kingdom) Stephen Finlay	(Republic of Ireland) Rory Kennedy	(United Kingdom) Stephen Finlay	Ford Focus RS WRC '00	—N/a
40	(United Kingdom) Mark Fisher	(United Kingdom) Gordon Noble	(United Kingdom) Mark Fisher	Peugeot 206 WRC	—N/a
43	(Greece) Sotiris Hatzitsopanis	(Greece) Nikos Kosmas	(Greece) Sotiris Hatzitsopanis	Ford Escort RS Cosworth	—N/a
55	(Greece) Mihalis Papaelias	(Greece) Antonis Garifalis	(Greece) Mihalis Papaelias	Ford Escort WRC	—N/a
57	(Italy) Giovanni Recordati	(Monaco) Freddy Delorme	(Italy) Giovanni Recordati	Toyota Celica GT-Four (ST205)	—N/a
67	(Greece) Giorgos Angelidis	(Greece) Kostas Tsahas	(Greece) Giorgos Angelidis	Mercedes-Benz 190E	—N/a
Group N Cup entries
28	(Uruguay) Gustavo Trelles	(Argentina) Jorge Del Buono	(Uruguay) Gustavo Trelles	Mitsubishi Carisma GT Evo VI	—N/a
29	(Austria) Manfred Stohl	(Austria) Peter Müller	(Austria) Manfred Stohl	Mitsubishi Lancer Evo VI	P
30	(Germany) Uwe Nittel	(Germany) Detlef Ruf	(Germany) Uwe Nittel	Mitsubishi Carisma GT Evo VI	—N/a
32	(Peru) Ramón Ferreyros	(Peru) Gonzalo Saenz	(Peru) Ramón Ferreyros	Mitsubishi Lancer Evo VI	—N/a
33	(Uruguay) Gabriel Mendez	(Uruguay) Daniel Muzio	(Uruguay) Gabriel Mendez	Mitsubishi Lancer Evo VI	—N/a
34	(Argentina) Claudio Marcelo Menzi	(Argentina) Edgardo Galindo	(Argentina) Claudio Marcelo Menzi	Mitsubishi Lancer Evo VI	P
35	(Argentina) Gabriel Pozzo	(Argentina) Rodolfo Amelio Ortiz	(Argentina) Gabriel Pozzo	Mitsubishi Lancer Evo VI	P
44	(Italy) Nicola Caldani	(Italy) Giuseppe Marchi	(Italy) Nicola Caldani	Mitsubishi Lancer Evo VI	—N/a
45	(Greece) Pavlos Moschoutis	(Greece) Emmanouel Vardaxis	(Greece) Pavlos Moschoutis	Mitsubishi Lancer Evo III	—N/a
46	(Greece) Grigoris Nioras	(Greece) Kostas Lytras	(Greece) Hellenic Police	Subaru Impreza WRX	—N/a
47	(Greece) Theodoros Aliferis	(Greece) Giorgos Vellis	(Greece) Theodoros Aliferis	Mitsubishi Lancer Evo III	—N/a
48	(Greece) Dimitris Nassoulas	(Greece) Iosif Galerakis	(Greece) Dimitris Nassoulas	Mitsubishi Lancer Evo V	—N/a
49	(Greece) Dimitris Drivakos	(Greece) Kostas Zotiadis	(Greece) Dimitris Drivakos	Mitsubishi Lancer Evo V	—N/a
50	(Greece) Theodoros Petalidis	(Greece) Ioannis Samartzis	(Greece) Theodoros Petalidis	Subaru Impreza WRX	—N/a
51	(Greece) Iaveris Aris	(Greece) Giorgos Kairis	(Greece) Iaveris Aris	Mitsubishi Lancer Evo VI	—N/a
52	(Greece) Lazaros Panagiotounis	(Greece) Elias Panagiotounis	(Greece) Lazaros Panagiotounis	Mitsubishi Lancer Evo VI	—N/a
53	(United Kingdom) Alastair Cavenagh	(Kenya) Crispin Sassoon	(United Kingdom) Alastair Cavenagh	Mitsubishi Lancer Evo VI	—N/a
58	(Greece) Makis Thergiakis	(Greece) Andreas Vlahogenis	(Greece) Makis Thergiakis	Mitsubishi Carisma GT Evo VI	—N/a
59	(Ecuador) Alfonso Quirola	(Ecuador) George Richards	(Ecuador) Alfonso Quirola	Mitsubishi Carisma GT Evo VI	—N/a
60	(Netherlands) Ries Huisman	(Netherlands) Bart van Riemsdijk	(Netherlands) Ries Huisman	Subaru Impreza	—N/a
61	(United Kingdom) John Lloyd	(United Kingdom) Paul Amandini	(United Kingdom) John Lloyd	Subaru Impreza	—N/a
62	(Israel) Rami Shohatovich	(Cyprus) Michalakis Michael	(Israel) Rami Shohatovich	Mitsubishi Lancer Evo V	—N/a
64	(Greece) Dionyssis Spanos	(Greece) Sotiris Gotovos	(Greece) Dionyssis Spanos	Lancia Delta HF Integrale	—N/a
65	(Greece) Andreas Theodorakopoulos	(Greece) Andreas Tringas	(Greece) Andreas Theodorakopoulos	Ford Escort RS Cosworth	—N/a
66	(Belgium) Bob Colsoul	(Belgium) Tom Colsoul	(Belgium) Bob Colsoul	Mitsubishi Lancer Evo V	—N/a
120	(Greece) Themistoklis Katsabekis	(Greece) Ioannis Vassilopoulos	(Greece) Themistoklis Katsabekis	Volkswagen Polo 16V	—N/a
121	(Portugal) António Pinto dos Santos	(Portugal) Nuno Rodrigues da Silva	(Portugal) António Pinto dos Santos	Renault 4 GTL	—N/a

=== Itinerary ===
All dates and times are EEST (UTC+3).

Date	Time	No.	Stage name	Distance
Leg 1 — 88.81 km
9 June	11:40	SS1	Skourta	20.02 km
9 June	12:11	SS2	Klidi	8.09 km
9 June	12:42	SS3	Thiva	20.12 km
9 June	15:40	SS4	Kineta	9.47 km
9 June	16:05	SS5	Agii Theodoroi	31.11 km
Leg 2 — 159.57 km
10 June	09:47	SS6	Zeli 1	28.32 km
10 June	10:47	SS7	Mendenitsa 1	28.05 km
10 June	12:27	SS8	Paleohori 1	10.71 km
10 June	13:08	SS9	Gravia 1	25.56 km
10 June	13:47	SS10	Elatos 1	10.56 km
10 June	15:59	SS11	Zeli 2	28.32 km
10 June	16:59	SS12	Mendenitsa 2	28.05 km
Leg 3 — 141.89 km
11 June	09:27	SS13	Pavliani 1	24.71 km
11 June	10:10	SS14	Stromi 1	22.82 km
11 June	11:48	SS15	Paleohori 2	10.71 km
11 June	12:29	SS16	Gravia 2	25.56 km
11 June	13:08	SS17	Elatos 2	10.56 km
11 June	15:00	SS18	Pavliani 2	24.71 km
11 June	15:43	SS19	Stromi 2	22.82 km

== Results ==
=== Overall ===
Pos.	No.	Driver	Co-driver	Team	Car	Time	Difference	Points
1	5	(United Kingdom) Colin McRae	(United Kingdom) Nicky Grist	(United Kingdom) Ford Motor Co. Ltd.	Ford Focus RS WRC '00	4:56:54.8		10
2	6	(Spain) Carlos Sainz	(Spain) Luis Moya	(United Kingdom) Ford Motor Co. Ltd.	Ford Focus RS WRC '00	4:57:17.9	+23.1	6
3	4	(Finland) Juha Kankkunen	(Finland) Juha Repo	(Japan) Subaru World Rally Team	Subaru Impreza S6 WRC '00	5:03:33.1	+6:38.3	4
4	23	(Japan) Toshihiro Arai	(United Kingdom) Roger Freeman	(Japan) Spike Subaru Team	Subaru Impreza S5 WRC '99	5:04:35.6	+7:40.8	3
5	11	(Germany) Armin Schwarz	(Germany) Manfred Hiemer	(Czech Republic) Škoda Motorsport	Škoda Octavia WRC	5:06:05.8	+9:11.0	2
6	25	(Saudi Arabia) Abdullah Bakhashab	(United Kingdom) Bobby Willis	Toyota Team Saudi Arabia	Toyota Corolla WRC	5:09:49.7	+12:54.9	1

=== World Rally Cars ===
==== Classification ====
Position		No.	Driver	Co-driver	Entrant	Car	Time	Difference	Points
Event	Class	No.	Driver	Co-driver	Entrant	Car	Time	Difference	Points
1	1	5	(United Kingdom) Colin McRae	(United Kingdom) Nicky Grist	(United Kingdom) Ford Motor Co. Ltd.	Ford Focus RS WRC '00	4:56:54.8		10
2	2	6	(Spain) Carlos Sainz	(Spain) Luis Moya	(United Kingdom) Ford Motor Co. Ltd.	Ford Focus RS WRC '00	4:57:17.9	+23.1	6
3	3	4	(Finland) Juha Kankkunen	(Finland) Juha Repo	(Japan) Subaru World Rally Team	Subaru Impreza S6 WRC '00	5:03:33.1	+6:38.3	4
5	4	11	(Germany) Armin Schwarz	(Germany) Manfred Hiemer	(Czech Republic) Škoda Motorsport	Škoda Octavia WRC	5:06:05.8	+9:11.0	2
9	5	9	(France) François Delecour	(France) Daniel Grataloup	(France) Peugeot Esso	Peugeot 206 WRC	5:12:07.1	+15:12.3	0
Retired SS14		3	(United Kingdom) Richard Burns	(United Kingdom) Robert Reid	(Japan) Subaru World Rally Team	Subaru Impreza S6 WRC '00	Turbo		0
Retired SS10		8	(Finland) Toni Gardemeister	(Finland) Paavo Lukander	(Spain) SEAT Sport	SEAT Córdoba WRC Evo2	Steering		0
Retired SS9		10	(Finland) Marcus Grönholm	(Finland) Timo Rautiainen	(France) Peugeot Esso	Peugeot 206 WRC	Engine		0
Retired SS7		7	(France) Didier Auriol	(France) Denis Giraudet	(Spain) SEAT Sport	SEAT Córdoba WRC Evo2	Mechanical		0
Retired SS6		15	(United Kingdom) Alister McRae	(United Kingdom) David Senior	(South Korea) Hyundai Castrol World Rally Team	Hyundai Accent WRC	Over time limit		0
Retired SS5		1	(Finland) Tommi Mäkinen	(Finland) Risto Mannisenmäki	(Japan) Marlboro Mitsubishi Ralliart	Mitsubishi Lancer Evo VI	Wheel hub		0
Retired SS4		12	(Spain) Luis Climent Asensio	(Spain) Álex Romaní	(Czech Republic) Škoda Motorsport	Škoda Octavia WRC	Lost wheel		0
Retired SS4		14	(Sweden) Kenneth Eriksson	(Sweden) Staffan Parmander	(South Korea) Hyundai Castrol World Rally Team	Hyundai Accent WRC	Engine		0
Retired SS2		2	(Belgium) Freddy Loix	(Belgium) Sven Smeets	(Japan) Marlboro Mitsubishi Ralliart	Mitsubishi Carisma GT Evo VI	Suspension		0

==== Special stages ====
Day	Stage	Stage name	Length	Winner	Car	Time	Class leaders
Leg 1 (9 Jun)	SS1	Skourta	20.02 km	(Finland) Marcus Grönholm	Peugeot 206 WRC	11:54.6	(Finland) Marcus Grönholm
Leg 1 (9 Jun)	SS2	Klidi	8.09 km	(United Kingdom) Colin McRae	Ford Focus RS WRC '00	5:40.1	(Finland) Marcus Grönholm
Leg 1 (9 Jun)	SS3	Thiva	20.12 km	(United Kingdom) Colin McRae	Ford Focus RS WRC '00	16:23.1	(United Kingdom) Colin McRae
Leg 1 (9 Jun)	SS4	Kineta	9.47 km	(Finland) Marcus Grönholm (Norway) Petter Solberg	Peugeot 206 WRC; Ford Focus RS WRC '00	5:20.7	(United Kingdom) Colin McRae
Leg 1 (9 Jun)	SS5	Agii Theodoroi	31.11 km	(United Kingdom) Colin McRae	Ford Focus RS WRC '00	24:47.6	(United Kingdom) Colin McRae
Leg 2 (10 Jun)	SS6	Zeli 1	28.32 km	(United Kingdom) Richard Burns	Subaru Impreza S6 WRC '00	20:44.9	(United Kingdom) Colin McRae
Leg 2 (10 Jun)	SS7	Mendenitsa 1	28.05 km	(United Kingdom) Colin McRae	Ford Focus RS WRC '00	19:58.5	(United Kingdom) Colin McRae
Leg 2 (10 Jun)	SS8	Paleohori 1	10.71 km	(United Kingdom) Richard Burns	Subaru Impreza S6 WRC '00	7:46.0	(United Kingdom) Colin McRae
Leg 2 (10 Jun)	SS9	Gravia 1	25.56 km	(Spain) Carlos Sainz	Ford Focus RS WRC '00	18:18.6	(United Kingdom) Colin McRae
Leg 2 (10 Jun)	SS10	Elatos 1	10.56 km	(United Kingdom) Richard Burns	Subaru Impreza S6 WRC '00	8:40.3	(United Kingdom) Colin McRae
Leg 2 (10 Jun)	SS11	Zeli 2	28.32 km	(United Kingdom) Richard Burns	Subaru Impreza S6 WRC '00	20:48.8	(United Kingdom) Colin McRae
Leg 2 (10 Jun)	SS12	Mendenitsa 2	28.05 km	(United Kingdom) Colin McRae	Ford Focus RS WRC '00	20:04.1	(United Kingdom) Colin McRae
Leg 3 (11 Jun)	SS13	Pavliani 1	24.71 km	(Spain) Carlos Sainz	Ford Focus RS WRC '00	20:23.2	(United Kingdom) Colin McRae
Leg 3 (11 Jun)	SS14	Stromi 1	22.82 km	(Norway) Petter Solberg	Ford Focus RS WRC '00	18:02.9	(United Kingdom) Colin McRae
Leg 3 (11 Jun)	SS15	Paleohori 2	10.71 km	(Norway) Petter Solberg	Ford Focus RS WRC '00	7:45.9	(United Kingdom) Colin McRae
Leg 3 (11 Jun)	SS16	Gravia 2	25.56 km	(Spain) Carlos Sainz	Ford Focus RS WRC '00	18:28.0	(Spain) Carlos Sainz
Leg 3 (11 Jun)	SS17	Elatos 2	10.56 km	(Norway) Petter Solberg	Ford Focus RS WRC '00	8:46.5	(Spain) Carlos Sainz
Leg 3 (11 Jun)	SS18	Pavliani 2	24.71 km	(Norway) Petter Solberg	Ford Focus RS WRC '00	20:16.2	(Spain) Carlos Sainz
Leg 3 (11 Jun)	SS19	Stromi 2	22.82 km	(Norway) Petter Solberg	Ford Focus RS WRC '00	18:15.0	(United Kingdom) Colin McRae

==== Championship standings ====
Pos.	Drivers' championships			Co-drivers' championships			Manufacturers' championships		
Pos.	Move	Driver	Points	Move	Co-driver	Points	Move	Manufacturer	Points
1		(United Kingdom) Richard Burns	38		(United Kingdom) Robert Reid	38		(Japan) Subaru World Rally Team	58
2	3	(United Kingdom) Colin McRae	24	3	(United Kingdom) Nicky Grist	24		(United Kingdom) Ford Motor Co. Ltd.	47
3	1	(Finland) Marcus Grönholm	24	1	(Finland) Timo Rautiainen	24		(France) Peugeot Esso	31
4	1	(Finland) Tommi Mäkinen	23	1	(Finland) Risto Mannisenmäki	23		(Japan) Marlboro Mitsubishi Ralliart	29
5	1	(Spain) Carlos Sainz	23	1	(Spain) Luis Moya	23	1	(Czech Republic) Škoda Motorsport	8

=== FIA Cup for Production Rally Drivers ===
==== Classification ====
Position		No.	Driver	Co-driver	Entrant	Car	Time	Difference	Points
Event	Class	No.	Driver	Co-driver	Entrant	Car	Time	Difference	Points
11	1	35	(Argentina) Gabriel Pozzo	(Argentina) Rodolfo Amelio Ortiz	(Argentina) Gabriel Pozzo	Mitsubishi Lancer Evo VI	5:18:51.8		10
12	2	28	(Uruguay) Gustavo Trelles	(Argentina) Jorge Del Buono	(Uruguay) Gustavo Trelles	Mitsubishi Carisma GT Evo VI	5:20:04.6	+1:12.8	6
13	3	29	(Austria) Manfred Stohl	(Austria) Peter Müller	(Austria) Manfred Stohl	Mitsubishi Lancer Evo VI	5:20:47.7	+1:55.9	4
14	4	32	(Peru) Ramón Ferreyros	(Peru) Gonzalo Saenz	(Peru) Ramón Ferreyros	Mitsubishi Lancer Evo VI	5:23:17.1	+4:25.3	3
21	5	66	(Belgium) Bob Colsoul	(Belgium) Tom Colsoul	(Belgium) Bob Colsoul	Mitsubishi Lancer Evo V	5:57:10.5	+38:18.7	2
22	6	45	(Greece) Pavlos Moschoutis	(Greece) Emmanouel Vardaxis	(Greece) Pavlos Moschoutis	Mitsubishi Lancer Evo III	5:57:45.3	+38:53.5	1
23	7	48	(Greece) Dimitris Nassoulas	(Greece) Iosif Galerakis	(Greece) Dimitris Nassoulas	Mitsubishi Lancer Evo V	5:59:33.2	+40:41.4	0
24	8	52	(Greece) Lazaros Panagiotounis	(Greece) Elias Panagiotounis	(Greece) Lazaros Panagiotounis	Mitsubishi Lancer Evo VI	6:03:42.1	+44:50.3	0
26	9	50	(Greece) Theodoros Petalidis	(Greece) Ioannis Samartzis	(Greece) Theodoros Petalidis	Subaru Impreza WRX	6:06:55.8	+48:04.0	0
48	10	121	(Portugal) António Pinto dos Santos	(Portugal) Nuno Rodrigues da Silva	(Portugal) António Pinto dos Santos	Renault 4 GTL	9:10:04.5	+3:51:12.7	0
Retired SS19		30	(Germany) Uwe Nittel	(Germany) Detlef Ruf	(Germany) Uwe Nittel	Mitsubishi Carisma GT Evo VI	Mechanical		0
Retired SS14		49	(Greece) Dimitris Drivakos	(Greece) Kostas Zotiadis	(Greece) Dimitris Drivakos	Mitsubishi Lancer Evo V	Mechanical		0
Retired SS13		120	(Greece) Themistoklis Katsabekis	(Greece) Ioannis Vassilopoulos	(Greece) Themistoklis Katsabekis	Volkswagen Polo 16V	Retired		0
Retired SS12		33	(Uruguay) Gabriel Mendez	(Uruguay) Daniel Muzio	(Uruguay) Gabriel Mendez	Mitsubishi Lancer Evo VI	Power steering		0
Retired SS12		34	(Argentina) Claudio Marcelo Menzi	(Argentina) Edgardo Galindo	(Argentina) Claudio Marcelo Menzi	Mitsubishi Lancer Evo VI	Suspension		0
Retired SS6		53	(United Kingdom) Alastair Cavenagh	(Kenya) Crispin Sassoon	(United Kingdom) Alastair Cavenagh	Mitsubishi Lancer Evo VI	Mechanical		0
Retired SS5		46	(Greece) Grigoris Nioras	(Greece) Kostas Lytras	(Greece) Hellenic Police	Subaru Impreza WRX	Suspension		0
Retired SS5		61	(United Kingdom) John Lloyd	(United Kingdom) Paul Amandini	(United Kingdom) John Lloyd	Subaru Impreza	Mechanical		0
Retired SS5		65	(Greece) Andreas Theodorakopoulos	(Greece) Andreas Tringas	(Greece) Andreas Theodorakopoulos	Ford Escort RS Cosworth	Mechanical		0
Retired SS4		60	(Netherlands) Ries Huisman	(Netherlands) Bart van Riemsdijk	(Netherlands) Ries Huisman	Subaru Impreza	Mechanical		0
Retired SS3		44	(Italy) Nicola Caldani	(Italy) Giuseppe Marchi	(Italy) Nicola Caldani	Mitsubishi Lancer Evo VI	Mechanical		0
Retired SS3		47	(Greece) Theodoros Aliferis	(Greece) Giorgos Vellis	(Greece) Theodoros Aliferis	Mitsubishi Lancer Evo III	Mechanical		0
Retired SS3		58	(Greece) Makis Thergiakis	(Greece) Andreas Vlahogenis	(Greece) Makis Thergiakis	Mitsubishi Carisma GT Evo VI	Electrical		0
Retired SS3		64	(Greece) Dionyssis Spanos	(Greece) Sotiris Gotovos	(Greece) Dionyssis Spanos	Lancia Delta HF Integrale	Mechanical		0
Retired SS2		59	(Ecuador) Alfonso Quirola	(Ecuador) George Richards	(Ecuador) Alfonso Quirola	Mitsubishi Carisma GT Evo VI	Mechanical		0
Retired SS2		62	(Israel) Rami Shohatovich	(Cyprus) Michalakis Michael	(Israel) Rami Shohatovich	Mitsubishi Lancer Evo V	Mechanical		0
Retired SS1		51	(Greece) Iaveris Aris	(Greece) Giorgos Kairis	(Greece) Iaveris Aris	Mitsubishi Lancer Evo VI	Retired		0

==== Special stages ====
Day	Stage	Stage name	Length	Winner	Car	Time	Class leaders
Leg 1 (9 Jun)	SS1	Skourta	20.02 km	(Argentina) Claudio Marcelo Menzi	Mitsubishi Lancer Evo VI	13:05.5	(Argentina) Claudio Marcelo Menzi
Leg 1 (9 Jun)	SS2	Klidi	8.09 km	(Austria) Manfred Stohl	Mitsubishi Lancer Evo VI	6:06.0	(Argentina) Claudio Marcelo Menzi
Leg 1 (9 Jun)	SS3	Thiva	20.12 km	(Austria) Manfred Stohl	Mitsubishi Lancer Evo VI	17:43.9	(Argentina) Claudio Marcelo Menzi
Leg 1 (9 Jun)	SS4	Kineta	9.47 km	(Argentina) Gabriel Pozzo	Mitsubishi Lancer Evo VI	5:52.6	(Argentina) Claudio Marcelo Menzi
Leg 1 (9 Jun)	SS5	Agii Theodoroi	31.11 km	(Argentina) Claudio Marcelo Menzi	Mitsubishi Lancer Evo VI	26:49.5	(Argentina) Claudio Marcelo Menzi
Leg 2 (10 Jun)	SS6	Zeli 1	28.32 km	(Argentina) Gabriel Pozzo	Mitsubishi Lancer Evo VI	22:24.5	(Argentina) Claudio Marcelo Menzi
Leg 2 (10 Jun)	SS7	Mendenitsa 1	28.05 km	(Argentina) Gabriel Pozzo	Mitsubishi Lancer Evo VI	22:20.4	(Argentina) Gabriel Pozzo
Leg 2 (10 Jun)	SS8	Paleohori 1	10.71 km	(Argentina) Gabriel Pozzo	Mitsubishi Lancer Evo VI	8:24.3	(Argentina) Gabriel Pozzo
Leg 2 (10 Jun)	SS9	Gravia 1	25.56 km	(Uruguay) Gustavo Trelles	Mitsubishi Carisma GT Evo VI	19:51.6	(Argentina) Gabriel Pozzo
Leg 2 (10 Jun)	SS10	Elatos 1	10.56 km	(Argentina) Claudio Marcelo Menzi	Mitsubishi Lancer Evo VI	9:12.6	(Argentina) Gabriel Pozzo
Leg 2 (10 Jun)	SS11	Zeli 2	28.32 km	(Argentina) Gabriel Pozzo	Mitsubishi Lancer Evo VI	22:28.4	(Argentina) Gabriel Pozzo
Leg 2 (10 Jun)	SS12	Mendenitsa 2	28.05 km	(Argentina) Gabriel Pozzo	Mitsubishi Lancer Evo VI	22:39.8	(Argentina) Gabriel Pozzo
Leg 3 (11 Jun)	SS13	Pavliani 1	24.71 km	(Germany) Uwe Nittel	Mitsubishi Carisma GT Evo VI	21:30.9	(Argentina) Gabriel Pozzo
Leg 3 (11 Jun)	SS14	Stromi 1	22.82 km	(Germany) Uwe Nittel	Mitsubishi Carisma GT Evo VI	19:21.3	(Argentina) Gabriel Pozzo
Leg 3 (11 Jun)	SS15	Paleohori 2	10.71 km	(Germany) Uwe Nittel	Mitsubishi Carisma GT Evo VI	8:18.2	(Argentina) Gabriel Pozzo
Leg 3 (11 Jun)	SS16	Gravia 2	25.56 km	(Uruguay) Gustavo Trelles	Mitsubishi Carisma GT Evo VI	19:33.4	(Argentina) Gabriel Pozzo
Leg 3 (11 Jun)	SS17	Elatos 2	10.56 km	(Germany) Uwe Nittel	Mitsubishi Carisma GT Evo VI	9:09.8	(Argentina) Gabriel Pozzo
Leg 3 (11 Jun)	SS18	Pavliani 2	24.71 km	(Austria) Manfred Stohl	Mitsubishi Lancer Evo VI	21:39.5	(Argentina) Gabriel Pozzo
Leg 3 (11 Jun)	SS19	Stromi 2	22.82 km	(Uruguay) Gustavo Trelles	Mitsubishi Carisma GT Evo VI	19:18.9	(Argentina) Gabriel Pozzo

==== Championship standings ====
Pos.	Drivers' championships		
Pos.	Move	Driver	Points
1		(Austria) Manfred Stohl	31
2		(Uruguay) Gustavo Trelles	28
3	7	(Argentina) Gabriel Pozzo	16
4	1	(Portugal) Miguel Campos	13
5	1	(Argentina) Claudio Marcelo Menzi	12
