= 2000 Rally Sanremo =

Twelfth round of the 2000 World Rally Championship

2000 Rally Sanremo Rallye Sanremo 2000
Round 12 of the 2000 World Rally Championship
| ← Previous event | Next event → |
- Host country: Italy
- Dates run: October 19, 2000 – October 22, 2000
- Stages: 17 (344.98 km; 214.36 miles)
- Stage surface: Asphalt

Overall results
- Overall winner: Gilles Panizzi; Peugeot Esso; Peugeot 206 WRC

The 2000 Rally Sanremo (formally the Rallye D'Italia 2000) was the twelfth round of the 2000 World Rally Championship. The race was held over 4 days, from 19 October to 22 October 2000, and was won by Gilles Panizzi, his second win in the World Rally Championship.

== Itinerary ==
All dates and times are CEST (UTC+2)

| Date | Time | No. | Stage name | Distance |
|---|---|---|---|---|
| 20 Oct | 08:00 | SS1 | Apricale 1 | 16.73 km |
| 20 Oct | 08:29 | SS2 | Perinaldo 1 | 19.30 km |
| 20 Oct | 11:19 | SS3 | Apricale 2 | 16.73 km |
| 20 Oct | 11:48 | SS4 | Perinaldo 2 | 19.30 km |
| 20 Oct | 15:23 | SS5 | Ghimbegna 1 | 19.30 km |
| 20 Oct | 15:53 | SS6 | Baiardo 1 | 16.73 km |
| 20 Oct | 18:15 | SS7 | Ghimbegna 2 | 19.30 km |
| 20 Oct | 18:45 | SS8 | Baiardo 2 | 16.73 km |
Leg 1 total: 144.12 km
| 21 Oct | 07:11 | SS9 | Pantasina 1 | 15.61 km |
| 21 Oct | 07:48 | SS10 | Monte Ceppo 1 | 37.74 km |
| 21 Oct | 10:54 | SS11 | Pantasina 2 | 15.61 km |
| 21 Oct | 11:31 | SS12 | Monte Ceppo 2 | 37.74 km |
| 21 Oct | 15:20 | SS13 | Langan 1 | 37.81 km |
| 21 Oct | 16:23 | SS14 | Carpasio | 15.61 km |
| 21 Oct | 19:03 | SS15 | Langan 2 | 37.81 km |
Leg 2 total: 197.93 km
| 22 Oct | 08:37 | SS16 | Rezzo | 25.08 km |
| 22 Oct | 10:32 | SS17 | Colle d'Oggia | 15.66 km |
Leg 3 total: 40.74 km
Rally total: 382.79 km

== Results ==
| Position | No. | Driver | Co-driver | Car | Time | Difference |
|---|---|---|---|---|---|---|
| 1 | 10 | Gilles Panizzi | Hervé Panizzi | Peugeot 206 WRC | 3:52:07.3 | +-0:00 |
| 2 | 9 | François Delecour | Daniel Grataloup | Peugeot 206 WRC | 3:52:24.1 | +16.8 |
| 3 | 1 | Tommi Mäkinen | Risto Mannisenmäki | Mitsubishi Lancer Evo VI | 3:53:00.3 | +53:0 |
| 4 | 16 | Marcus Grönholm | Timo Rautiainen | Peugeot 206 WRC | 3:53:09.6 | +1:02.3 |
| 5 | 6 | Carlos Sainz Sr. | Luis Moya | Ford Focus WRC '00 | 3:53:18.6 | +1:11.3 |
| 6 | 5 | Colin McRae | Nicky Grist | Ford Focus WRC '00 | 3:53:47.3 | +1:40.0 |
| 7 | 4 | Jean-Joseph Simon | Jack Boyére | Subaru Impreza S6 WRC '00 | 3:54:04.0 | +1:56.7 |
| 8 | 2 | Freddy Loix | Sven Smeets | Mitsubishi Carisma GT Evo VI | 3:54:30.3 | +2:23.0 |
| 9 | 19 | Petter Solberg | Phil Mills | Subaru Impreza S6 WRC '00 | 3:54:39.0 | +2:31.7 |
| 10 | 43 | Sébastien Loeb | Daniel Elena | Toyota Corolla WRC | 3:55:41.7 | +3:34.4 |
| 11 | 41 | Renato Travaglia | Flavio Zanella | Peugeot 306 Maxi | 3:56:18.3 | +4:11.0 |
| 12 | 11 | Armin Schwarz | Manfred Hiemer | Škoda Octavia WRC Evo2 | 3:57:20.4 | +5:13.1 |
| 13 | 28 | Andrea Dallavilla | Danilo Fappani | Subaru Impreza S5 WRC '99 | 3:58:50.9 | +6:43.6 |
| 14 | 12 | Luis Climent Asensio | Alex Romaní | Škoda Octavia WRC Evo2 | 4:00:51.3 | +8:44.0 |
| 15 | 25 | Andrea Aghini | Dario D'Esposito | Mitsubishi Carisma GT Evo VI | 4:01:02.3 | +8:55.0 |
| 16 | 15 | Alister McRae | David Senior | Hyundai Accent WRC | 4:01:34.2 | +9:26.9 |
| 17 | 7 | Didier Auriol | Denis Giraudet | SEAT Córdoba WRC Evo3 | 4:02:21.7 | +10:14.4 |
| 18 | 47 | Diego Oldrati | Alessandrra Materazzetti | Subaru Impreza S5 WRC '99 | 4:03:00.3 | +10:53.0 |
| 19 | 51 | Renaud Verreydt | Jean-François Elst | SEAT Córdoba WRC Evo2 | 4:03:40.0 | +11:32.7 |
| 20 | 35 | Janusz Kulig | Jarosław Baran | Ford Focus WRC '99 | 4:04:25.4 | +12:18.1 |
| 21 | 29 | Serkan Yazici | Erkan Bodur | Toyota Corolla WRC | 4:06:43..1 | +14:35.8 |
| 22 | 37 | Gianluigi Galli | Maurizio Messina | Mitsubishi Lancer Evo VI | 4:09:44.6 | +17:37.3 |
| 23 | 76 | Alessandro Fiorio | Enrico Cantoni | Mitsubishi Carisma GT Evo VI | 4:10:21.8 | +18:14.5 |
| 24 | 36 | Gustavo Trelles | Jorge Del Buono | Mitsubishi Lancer Evo VI | 4:11:27.8 | +19:20.5 |
| 25 | 33 | Manfred Stohl | Peter Müller | Mitsubishi Lancer Evo VI | 4:11:31.2 | +19:23.9 |
| 26 | 39 | Ramón Ferreyros | Pablo Herrero | Mitsubishi Lancer Evo VI | 4:12:33.7 | +20:26.4 |
| 27 | 52 | Michele De Luca | Gabriele Minzoni | Subaru Impreza S5 WRC '98 | 4:12:41.1 | +20:33.4 |
| 28 | 75 | Emanuele Dati | Marisa Merlin | Mitsubishi Lancer Evo V | 4:13:24.2 | +21:16.9 |
| 29 | 49 | Luca Pedersoli | Nadia Mazzon | Fiat Punto Kit Car | 4:14:00.4 | +21:53.1 |
| 30 | 102 | Pasquale Tarantino | Fabio Colombo | Renault Clio Williams | 4:16:34.7 | +24:27.4 |
| 31 | 78 | Luca Cantamessa | Piercarlo Capolongo | Fiat Punto Kit Car | 4:18:04.0 | +25:56.7 |
| 32 | 93 | Patrizia Sciascia | Patrizia Boero | Renault Clio Williams | 4:19:43.4 | +27:36.1 |
| 33 | 81 | Elio Cortese | Monica Fortunato | Mitsubishi Lancer Evo VI | 4:19:52.6 | +27:45.3 |
| 34 | 50 | Ignacio Sanfilippo | José Vicente Medina | Mitsubishi Carisma GT Evo VI | 4:20:01.9 | +27:54.6 |
| 35 | 48 | Jesús Puras | Marc Martí | Citroën Saxo Kit Car | 4:20:39.6 | +28:32.3 |
| 36 | 94 | Gualtiero Pastore | Massimo Tarrano | Renault Clio Williams | 4:23:38.2 | +31:30.9 |
| 37 | 53 | Stanislav Gryazin | Dmitriy Eremeev | Mitsubishi Lancer Evo VI | 4:23:46.0 | +31:38.7 |
| 38 | 74 | Riccardo Errani | Stefano Casadio | Ford Escort RS Cosworth | 4:24:45.2 | +32:37.9 |
| 39 | 77 | Alessandro Bertuzzi | Marco Segoloni | Mitsubishi Lancer Evo VI | 4:25:23.9 | +33:16.6 |
| 40 | 110 | Simon Mauger | Scott Poxon | Ford Puma Kit Car | 4:26:05.3 | +33:58.0 |
| 41 | 85 | Renzo Grossi | Angelo Pasquali | Subaru Impreza WRX | 4:27:58.8 | +35:51.5 |
| 42 | 80 | Johan Deen | Harmen Scholtalbers | Mitsubishi Lancer Evo VI | 4:28:26.9 | +36:19.6 |
| 43 | 108 | Manuel Villa | Andrea Gorni | Fiat Punto Kit Car | 4:29:51.8 | +37:44.5 |
| 44 | 31 | Abdullah Bakhashab | Bobby Willis | Toyota Corolla WRC | 4:30:53.8 | +38:46.5 |
| 45 | 14 | Kenneth Eriksson | Staffan Parmander | Hyundai Accent WRC | 4:31:51.9 | +39:44.6 |
| 46 | 115 | Eugenio Lozza | Antonella Fiorendi | Renault Clio RS | 4:33:05.4 | +40:58.1 |
| 47 | 114 | Stefano Maccagnan | Emanuele Battisti | Peugeot 106 S16 | 4:37:29.2 | +45:21.9 |
| 48 | 86 | Alessandro Mango | Mauro Mango | Mitsubishi Lancer Evo VI | 4:38:02.1 | +45:54.8 |
| 49 | 89 | Maurizio Del Tenno | Antonio Vanini | Mitsubishi Lancer Evo VI | 4:38:49.8 | +46:42.5 |
| 50 | 127 | Giovanni Marco Lanza | Sergio Morabito | Honda Civic VTi | 4:39:19.9 | +47:12.6 |
| 51 | 111 | Alessandro Gai | Raffaello Bianchino | Peugeot 106 Maxi | 4:39:26.8 | +47:19.5 |
| 52 | 90 | Raymond Lintott | Tony Jackson | Mitsubishi Lancer Evo | 4:40:48.7 | +48:41.4 |
| 53 | 106 | Massimo Macaluso | Antonio Celot | Fiat Punto Kit Car | 4:42:06.4 | +49:59.1 |
| 54 | 134 | Riccardo Bolla | Giancarlo Lupi | Peugeot 106 Rallye | 4:43:48.3 | +51:41.0 |
| 55 | 125 | Luigi Terpin | Enrico Valle | Citroën Saxo VTS | 4:44:21.2 | +52:13.9 |
| 56 | 124 | Stefano Moretti | Nicola Doglio | Peugeot 106 Rallye | 4:45:52.9 | +53:45.6 |
| 57 | 120 | Lothar Diederich | Thomas Juchmes | Peugeot 106 S16 | 4:49:16.5 | +57:09.2 |
| 58 | 126 | Stefano Mazzeri | Pierpaolo Di Tommaso | Peugeot 106 S16 | 4:49:19.8 | +57:12.5 |
| 59 | 122 | Paolo Semeraro | Paolo Garavaglia | Renault Clio Williams | 4:55:22.0 | +1:03:14.7 |
| 60 | 123 | Giovanni Orengo | Roberto Brea | Renault Clio Williams | 5:00:59.6 | +1:08:52.3 |
| 61 | 133 | Fabrizio Sparavier | Maurizio Petrei | Fiat Cinquecento | 5:35:24.7 | +1:43:17.4 |
| 62 | 130 | Walter Vida | Simone Bevilacqua | Fiat Cinquecento | 5:45:06.3 | +1:52:59.0 |
