= Peugeot 206 WRC =

Rally car

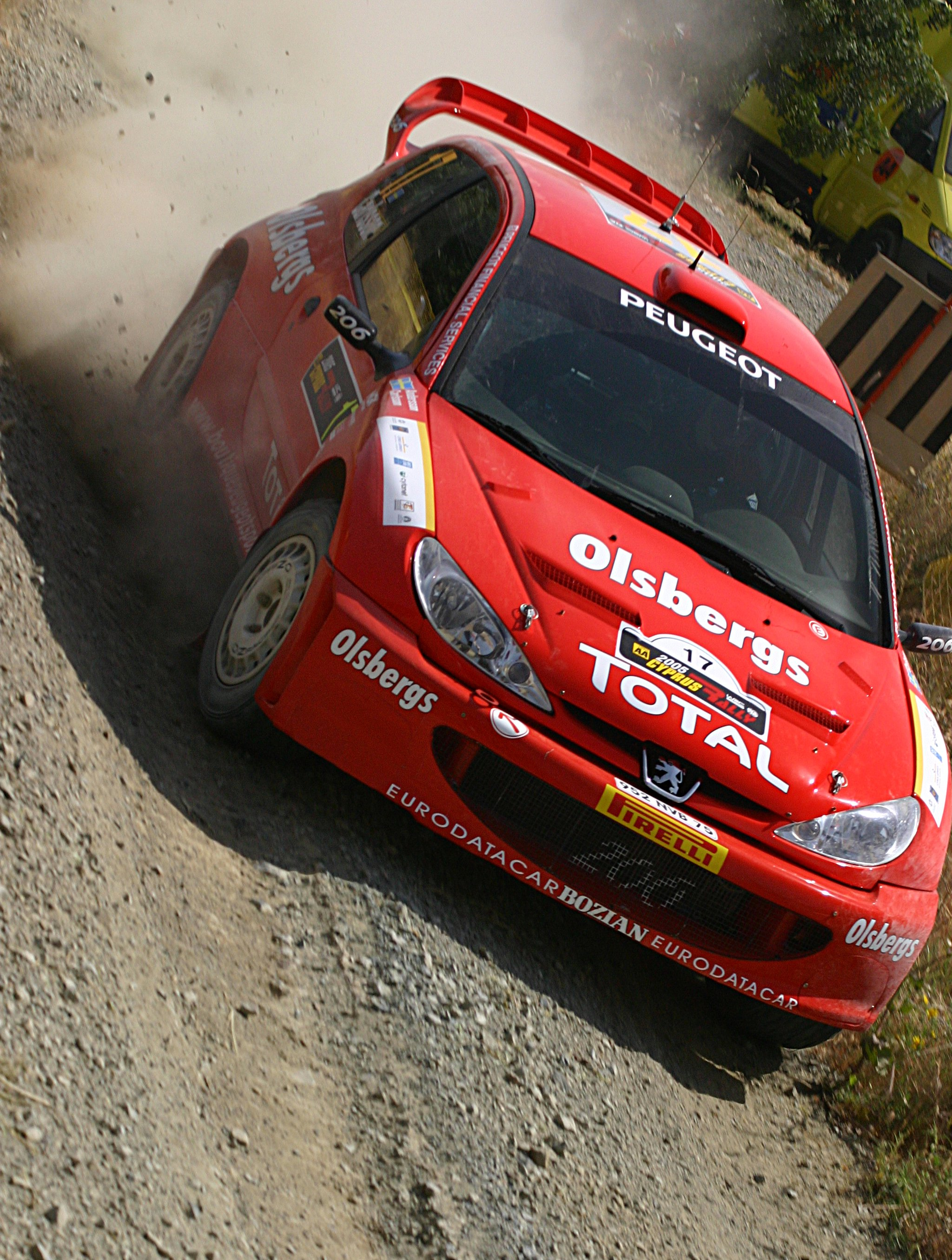
- Category: World Rally Car
- Constructor: Peugeot
- Designer: Michel Nandan (technical manager)
- Predecessor: Peugeot 205 Turbo 16 E2
- Successor: Peugeot 307 WRC

Technical specifications
- Length: 4,005 mm (157.7 in)
- Width: 1,770 mm (70 in)
- Height: 1,300 mm (51 in)
- Wheelbase: 2,486 mm (97.9 in)
- Engine: XU10J4RS 2.0 L (122 cu in) I4 turbocharged front-engine, all-wheel-drive
- Weight: 1,230 kg (2,712 lb)
- Tyres: Michelin

Competition history (WRC)
- Notable entrants: (France) Peugeot Sport
- Debut: (France) 1999 Tour de Corse
- First win: (Sweden) 2000 Swedish Rally
- Last win: (Spain) 2003 Rally Catalunya
- Last event: (France) 2008 Tour de Corse
Wins	Podiums	Titles
24	65	5
- Constructors' Championships: 3 (2000, 2001, 2002)
- Drivers' Championships: 2 (2000, 2002)

The Peugeot 206 WRC is a World Rally Car based on the Peugeot 206. It was used by Peugeot Sport, Peugeot's factory team, in the World Rally Championship from 1999 to 2003. The car brought Peugeot the manufacturers' world title three consecutive years (2000 to 2002). Marcus Grönholm won the drivers' title in 2000 and 2002.

== History ==
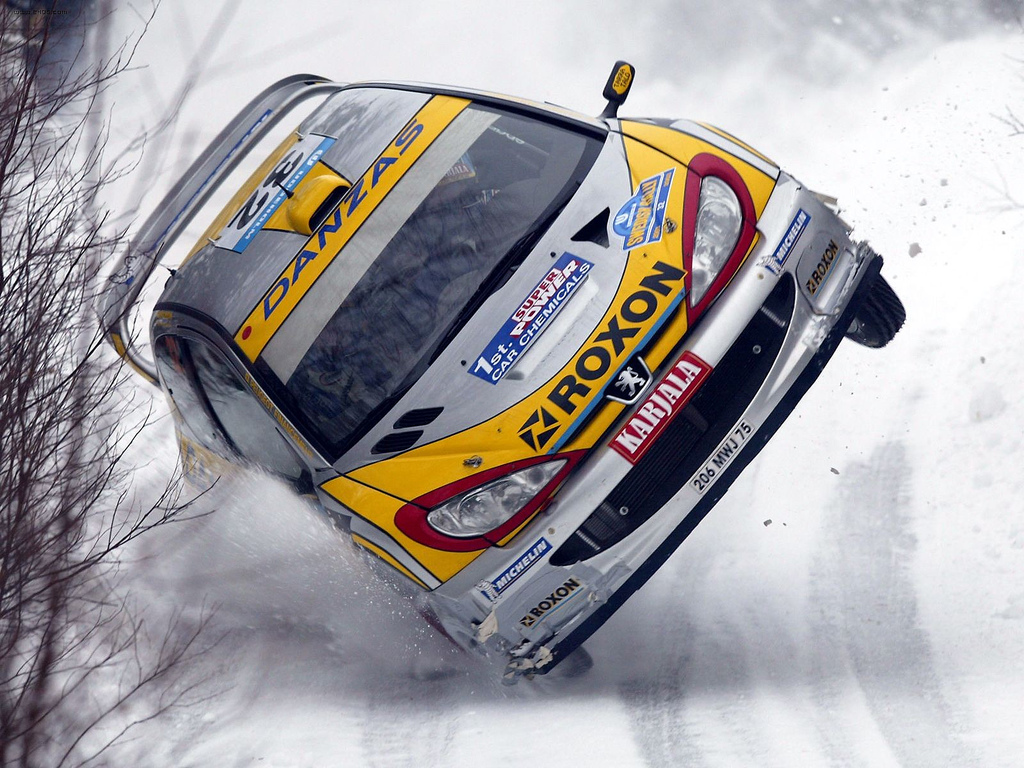
Juuso Pykälistö driving a 206 WRC at the 2003 Swedish Rally.

In order to homologate the 206 World Rally Car, Peugeot needed to sell road going versions of the 206 that were at least 4.0 metres long (the minimum length stipulated by the FIA for WRC cars). The WRC car was homologated with the 206 Grand Tourisme, similar to the standard 206 but with front and rear body extensions to bring the car from the standard road car's 3.83 meters to the rally car's 4 metre length. 4000 cars in total were produced, each with a unique number on a plaque on the door pillar both sides. 600 right-hand drive cars were produced for the UK. The mechanicals fitted to the Grand Tourisme were what was fitted to the upcoming 206 GTI, not yet released.

In 1999, Peugeot Sport unveiled the 206 WRC, and it competed for the first time in that year's World Rally Championship, with French tarmac veteran and long-time marque stalwart Gilles Panizzi narrowly failing, against a resurgent reigning champion in Mitsubishi's Tommi Mäkinen, to win the Rallye Sanremo. The car was soon a success, however, and won both the manufacturers' and drivers' championships in 2000, Peugeot's first such accolades since their withdrawal from the WRC after Group B was banned after the 1986 season, and achieved in the hands of Panizzi, Francois Delecour and Mäkinen's successor as drivers' world champion, Marcus Grönholm.

For 2001, Grönholm competed alongside two refugees of SEAT's exit from the championship at the end of 2000; compatriot Harri Rovanperä and the French 1994 world champion, Didier Auriol. Rovanperä and Auriol each contributed single wins, on Swedish Rally and Rally Catalunya respectively (the former to be a sole career win for the Finn, and the latter victory helped by assorted problems for the blisteringly quick debuting Citroën Xsara WRCs), before Auriol left the team at the end of the season. Grönholm, meanwhile, suffered sufficient reliability woes in the first half of the year such that he could manage no higher than fourth overall in the series, although Peugeot did fend off Ford, with a 1-2 result by the two Finns on the season-ending Rally of Great Britain to successfully defend the constructors' championship title.

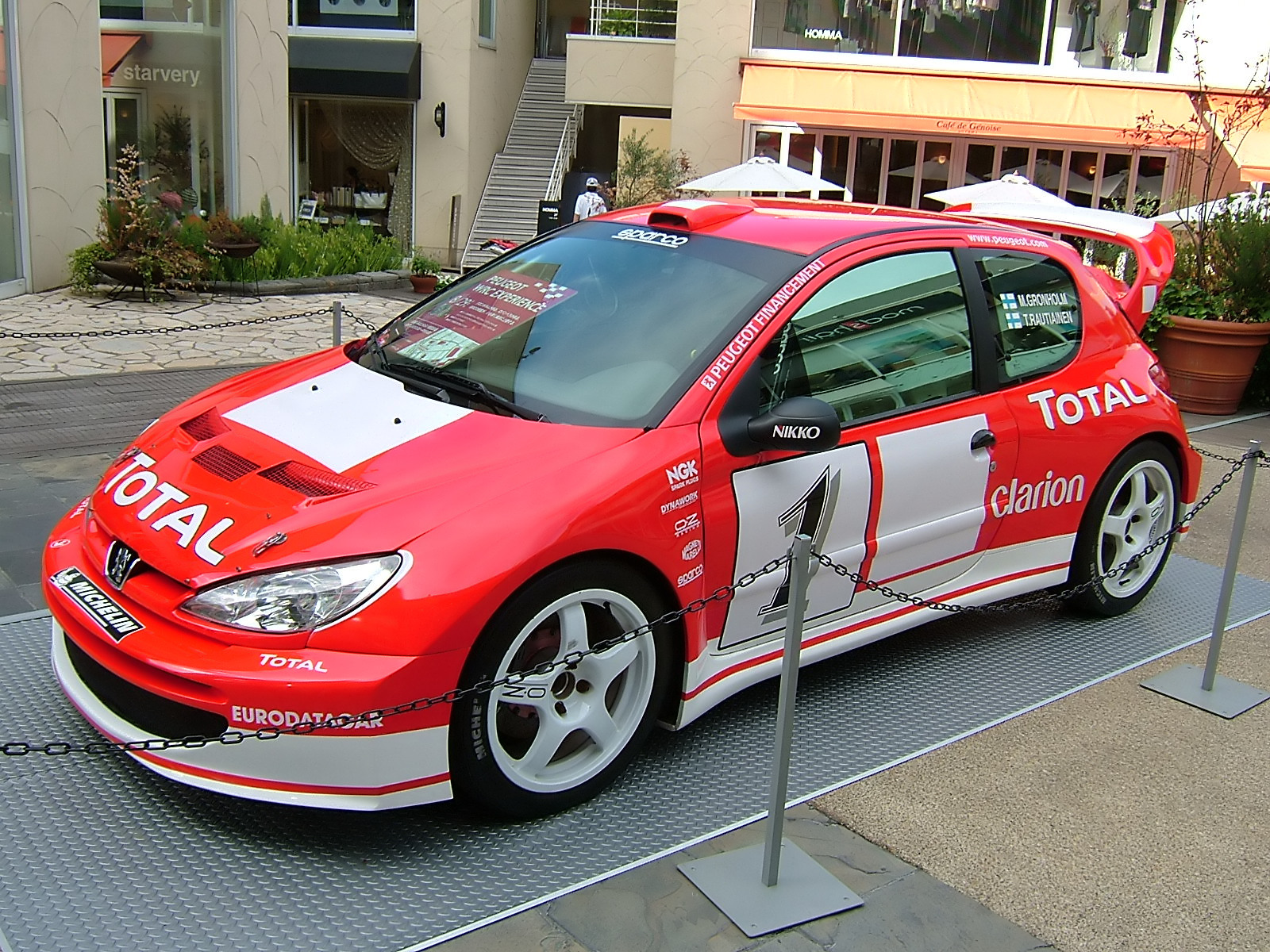
Grönholm's 206 WRC from the 2003 season on display.

In 2002, Grönholm – despite now being paired in the factory line-up with defending 2001 champion from Subaru, the Briton Richard Burns – led Peugeot to a repeat of the WRC title double aboard his 206 WRC. His dominance that year was compared to Michael Schumacher's dominance of Formula One. In summary, Peugeot won two drivers' championships, in 2000 and 2002, and three manufacturers' titles in a row between 2000 and 2002. However, by 2003 the 206 WRC was beginning to show its age and was less effective against the competition, notably the newer Xsara WRC and the Subaru Impreza WRC, so it was retired from competition at the end of the season, to be replaced with the 307 WRC, albeit, unlike its predecessor, based not on the production version's hatchback, but its coupé cabriolet body style.

The Peugeot 206 WRC was awarded the Autosport "Rally Car of the Year" in 2002, preceded by the Ford Focus RS WRC and followed by the Citroën Xsara WRC. Peugeot GB created a Peugeot 206 rally championship aimed at young drivers. The championship was created to help young drivers develop their careers. The cars were built by Vic Lee Racing and drivers such as Tom Boardman, Luke Pinder and Garry Jennings all drove in the championship.

== WRC victories ==
No.	Event	Season	Driver	Co-driver
1	(Sweden) Swedish Rally	2000	(Finland) Marcus Grönholm	(Finland) Timo Rautiainen
2	Rally New Zealand	2000	(Finland) Marcus Grönholm	(Finland) Timo Rautiainen
3	Rally Finland	2000	(Finland) Marcus Grönholm	(Finland) Timo Rautiainen
4	(France) Tour de Corse	2000	(France) Gilles Panizzi	(France) Hervé Panizzi
5	(Italy) Rallye Sanremo	2000	(France) Gilles Panizzi	(France) Hervé Panizzi
6	Rally Australia	2000	(Finland) Marcus Grönholm	(Finland) Timo Rautiainen
7	(Sweden) Swedish Rally	2001	(Finland) Harri Rovanperä	(Finland) Risto Pietiläinen
8	(Spain) Rally Catalunya	2001	(France) Didier Auriol	(France) Dennis Giraudet
9	Rally Finland	2001	(Finland) Marcus Grönholm	(Finland) Timo Rautiainen
10	(Italy) Rallye Sanremo	2001	(France) Gilles Panizzi	(France) Hervé Panizzi
11	Rally Australia	2001	(Finland) Marcus Grönholm	(Finland) Timo Rautiainen
12	(United Kingdom) Rally of Great Britain	2001	(Finland) Marcus Grönholm	(Finland) Timo Rautiainen
13	(Sweden) Swedish Rally	2002	(Finland) Marcus Grönholm	(Finland) Timo Rautiainen
14	(France) Tour de Corse	2002	(France) Gilles Panizzi	(France) Hervé Panizzi
15	(Spain) Rally Catalunya	2002	(France) Gilles Panizzi	(France) Hervé Panizzi
16	Cyprus Rally	2002	(Finland) Marcus Grönholm	(Finland) Timo Rautiainen
17	Rally Finland	2002	(Finland) Marcus Grönholm	(Finland) Timo Rautiainen
18	(Italy) Rallye Sanremo	2002	(France) Gilles Panizzi	(France) Hervé Panizzi
19	Rally New Zealand	2002	(Finland) Marcus Grönholm	(Finland) Timo Rautiainen
20	Rally Australia	2002	(Finland) Marcus Grönholm	(Finland) Timo Rautiainen
21	(Sweden) Swedish Rally	2003	(Finland) Marcus Grönholm	(Finland) Timo Rautiainen
22	Rally New Zealand	2003	(Finland) Marcus Grönholm	(Finland) Timo Rautiainen
23	Rally Argentina	2003	(Finland) Marcus Grönholm	(Finland) Timo Rautiainen
24	(Spain) Rally Catalunya	2003	(France) Gilles Panizzi	(France) Hervé Panizzi

== WRC results ==
Year	Team	Drivers	1	2	3	4	5	6	7	8	9	10	11	12	13	14	Points	Pos
1999	Peugeot																	
1999	Peugeot		MON	SWE	KEN	POR	ESP	FRA	ARG	GRE	NZL	FIN	CHN	ITA	AUS	GBR	11	6
1999	Peugeot	(Finland) Marcus Grönholm		Ret	4	8	5	Ret									11	6
1999	Peugeot	(France) Gilles Panizzi	Ret		33	2		7									11	6
1999	Peugeot	(France) François Delecour	Ret	Ret	9	Ret	Ret	Ret									11	6
2000	Peugeot																11	6
2000	Peugeot		MON	SWE	KEN	POR	ESP	ARG	GRE	NZL	FIN	CYP	FRA	ITA	AUS	GBR	111	1
2000	Peugeot	(Finland) Marcus Grönholm	Ret	1	Ret	2	5	2	Ret	1	1	Ret	5	4	1	2	111	1
2000	Peugeot	(France) Gilles Panizzi	Ret		Ret		6						1	1	Ret	8	111	1
2000	Peugeot	(France) François Delecour	Ret	7		5	7	13	9	Ret	6	3	2	2	3	6	111	1
2000	Peugeot	(Finland) Sebastian Lindholm									5						111	1
2001	Peugeot																	
2001	Peugeot		MON	SWE	POR	ESP	ARG	CYP	GRE	KEN	FIN	NZL	ITA	FRA	AUS	GBR	106	1
2001	Peugeot	(Finland) Marcus Grönholm	Ret	Ret	3	Ret	Ret	Ret	Ret	Ret	1	5	7	Ret	1	1	106	1
2001	Peugeot	(France) Didier Auriol	Ret	Ret	8	1	Ret	Ret	Ret	Ret	Ret	6	3	3	3	7	106	1
2001	Peugeot	(France) Gilles Panizzi	Ret			2							1	2	9		106	1
2001	Peugeot	(Finland) Harri Rovanperä		1	Ret		Ret	Ret	3	2	4	3			4	2	106	1
2001	HF Grifone SRL	(France) Gilles Panizzi			12			Ret	Ret		14					Ret	0	-
2001	HF Grifone SRL	(Finland) Harri Rovanperä											11	7			0	-
2001	F.P.F. Sport	(Italy) Renato Travaglia											5				2	20
2001	Simon Jean-Joseph	(France) Simon Jean-Joseph				9		Ret	8				10				0	-

Awards
Preceded by Ford Focus RS WRC	Autosport; Rally Car of the Year; 2002	Succeeded by Citroën Xsara WRC
