= Robert Reid (co-driver) =

British rally co-driver (born 1966)

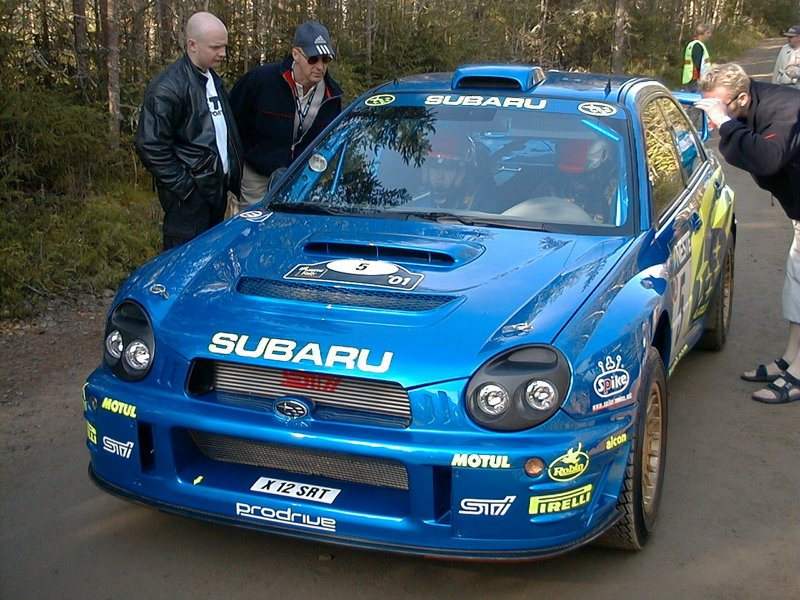

Personal information
- Nationality: (United Kingdom) British
- Born: 17 February 1966 (age 60); Perth, Scotland, UK

World Rally Championship record
- Years active: 1991–2003
- Driver: (United Kingdom) Richard Burns
- Teams: Subaru, Mitsubishi, Peugeot
- Rallies: 103
- Co-championships: 1 (2001)
- Rally wins: 10
- Podiums: 34
- Stage wins: 277
- First rally: 1991 RAC Rally
- First win: 1998 Safari Rally
- Last win: 2001 Rally New Zealand
- Last rally: 2003 Rally Catalunya

Robert Reid (born 17 February 1966) is a retired British rally co-driver who became 2001 World Rally Champion alongside champion driver Richard Burns (1971–2005). Since retiring from competition, Reid has held various positions with both Motorsport UK and FIA. From 2021 through April 2025, Reid served as the FIA Deputy President for Sport.

Reid's partnership with Burns lasted from 1991 until 2003 during which time they entered into 103 world rallies, achieving ten victories, 277 stage wins and 34 podium finishes. His previous motorsport governance and administration roles have included President of the FIA Closed Road Commission, Vice-President of the WRC Commission and a member of the FIA International Sporting Code Review Commission.

== Career ==
=== Early years ===
Reid's first stage rally was the 1984 Hackle Rally, a round of the Scottish Rally Championship. For seven years he competed in many different rallies around the United Kingdom co-driving for many notable drivers including Robbie Head, Colin McRae and Alister McRae. However, he is most well known for his long and successful partnership with Richard Burns.

=== Burns and Reid ===
In 1991, Burns and Reid formed a new partnership and placed 16th in the British round of the World Rally Championship that year. The following year, they finished in seventh place and in 1993 they won the British Rally Championship driving a Subaru making Burns the youngest ever British champion. In 1994 and 1995, Burns and Reid competed in the Asia Pacific Rally Championship and occasionally rounds of the World Rally Championship. Their best result was third in the 1995 British round of the World Rally Championship driving a Subaru.

=== 1996-1998 Mitsubishi ===
Between 1996 and 1998, Burns and Reid drove for Mitsubishi with their results improving every year. In 1996, they placed fifth in the Australian round and fourth in the Argentinian round of the World Rally Championship. The following year. they finished fourth in the British, Australian, Indonesian, New Zealand and Greek rounds of the Championship as well as placing second in the Kenyan round. Even further progress was made in 1998 with their first ever victory in the Kenyan round of the World Rally Championship and a first at the British round of the Championship. They placed sixth overall in the 1998 World Rally Championship season.

=== 1999-2001 Subaru ===
In 1999, Burns and Reid switched manufacturer and drove for Subaru. They won the Greek, Australian and British rounds of the Championship and finished second in the Argentinian, Finnish and Chinese rounds. Overall, they finished runners-up in the 1999 World Rally Championship season.

The following year, Burns and Reid would finish runners-up a second time even though they won four rounds of the 2000 World Rally Championship season. They finished first in the Kenyan, Portuguese, Argentinian and British rounds, but Marcus Grönholm still managed to beat them at the end of the season by five points.

==== 2001 World Rally Champions ====
In 2001, Burns and Reid would win their first and only World Rally Championship title finishing two points ahead of Colin McRae. They won the New Zealand round of the Championship and placed second at the Argentinian, Cypriot, Finnish and Australian rounds. Burns became the first English driver to become world champion.

=== 2002-2003 Peugeot ===
The move to Peugeot did not prove to be as successful, though they did manage four second place finishes in the 2002 season at the Spanish, Cypriot, Finnish and German rounds of the Championship. Marcus Grönholm won the title by thirty points from his nearest rival. Burns and Reid finished in fifth place overall.

Burns and Reid managed two second place and five third place positions in the 2003 Championship, giving them an outside chance of re-claiming the world title going into the Wales Rally GB, the final rally of the 2003 World Rally Championship season. Whilst driving to the final event, Burns suffered a blackout at the wheel and was withdrawn from the event. Burns was diagnosed with a malignant brain tumour. Throughout Burns' illness, Reid spent two to three days per week with him and did not want to race with any other driver. On 25 November 2005, four years to the day since Burns and Reid had won the World Championship title, Burns died.

According to the online rally database eWRC-Results.com and Reid's own testimony, he has only entered one rally since Burns was taken ill, the 2008 Richard Burns Memorial Rally. He was co-driver to Estonian Markko Martin, who was with Burns on the day he fell ill. In 2007, Reid was contacted by Colin McRae to potentially act as his co-driver in a return to the World Rally Championships. The pair were due to test together, but McRae was killed a week before the test.

== Non-racing career ==
Since retiring from competition, Reid has held several governance and administration positions within motorsport. He spent several years as the Performance Director of the UK Motor Sport Association establishing elite programmes to develop young driver talent in the United Kingdom. More recently, he has been working alongside Alexander Wurz to select and train emerging talent at the FIA Institute Young Driver Excellence Academy.

Reid's positions at the FIA have included being Vice-President of the World Rally Championship Commission, the Chair of WRC Stewards and Chair of the International Sporting Code Review Commission. In 2021 he was elected Deputy President for Sport alongside Mohammed bin Sulayem. He resigned this position on 10 April 2025, stating that the FIA has, "a fundamental breakdown in governance standards within motorsport's global governing body."

Reid lent his voice and likeness in the 2004 sim rally game Richard Burns Rally as the player's co-driver alongside Richard Burns who voiced himself in the game's tutorial section. Reid himself went on to use a modified version of Richard Burns Rally as a training tool for rally stewards during the COVID-19 pandemic.

== WRC victories ==
#	Event	Season	Driver	Car
1	(Kenya) Safari Rally	1998	Richard Burns	Mitsubishi Lancer Evolution IV
2	(United Kingdom) Rally of Great Britain	1998	Richard Burns	Mitsubishi Lancer Evolution V
3	(Greece) Acropolis Rally	1999	Richard Burns	Subaru Impreza WRC 99
4	Rally Australia	1999	Richard Burns	Subaru Impreza WRC 99
5	(United Kingdom) Rally of Great Britain	1999	Richard Burns	Subaru Impreza WRC 99
6	(Kenya) Safari Rally	2000	Richard Burns	Subaru Impreza WRC 99
7	Rallye de Portugal	2000	Richard Burns	Subaru Impreza WRC 00
8	Rally Argentina	2000	Richard Burns	Subaru Impreza WRC 00
9	(United Kingdom) Rally of Great Britain	2000	Richard Burns	Subaru Impreza WRC 00
10	Rally New Zealand	2001	Richard Burns	Subaru Impreza WRC 2001
