= Abdullah Bakhashab =

Saudi Arabian rally driver (born 1968)

Personal information
- Nationality: (Saudi Arabia) Saudi
- Born: 26 September 1968 (age 58)

World Rally Championship record
- Years active: 1998-2002
- Co-driver: (United Kingdom) Bobby Willis (Sweden) Arne Hertz (United Kingdom) Michael Park
- Teams: Toyota Team Saudi Arabia
- Rallies: 30
- Championships: 0
- Rally wins: 0
- Podiums: 0
- Stage wins: 0
- Total points: 1
- First rally: 1998 Rallye de Portugal
- Last rally: 2002 Acropolis Rally

Abdullah Bakhashab (born 26 September 1968) is a Saudi Arabian rally driver who competed in the WRC between 1998 and 2002. He started his rally career in 1992 and scored his first points at the 2000 Acropolis Rally. He also won the 1995 Middle East Rally Championship title.
