= Roger Freeman (co-driver) =

British rally co-driver (1951–2003)

Roger Freeman (9 October 1951 – 12 July 2003) was the SCCA ProRally Subaru factory team co-driver for Mark Lovell. He and Lovell were killed when their rally car left the road and struck a tree shortly after the start of the first stage of the Oregon Trail Rally. The pair had been rallying together since 1986. Together, they had previously won National Rally titles in the United Kingdom and the United States.

Freeman retired from co-driving in 1988. He was lured out of retirement by Lovell who was looking to contest the championship with Subaru.
