= 2002 Rallye Sanremo =

11th round of the 2002 World Rally Championship

2002 Rallye Sanremo 44th Rallye Sanremo - Rallye d'Italia
Round 11 of the 2002 World Rally Championship season
← Previous event	Next event →
- Host country: Italy
- Rally base: Sanremo
- Dates run: September 20, 2002 – September 22, 2002
- Stages: 18 (385.84 km; 239.75 miles)
- Stage surface: Asphalt
- Overall distance: 1,407.04 km (874.29 miles)

Statistics
- Crews: 53 at start, 35 at finish

Overall results
- Overall winner: (France) Gilles Panizzi (France) Hervé Panizzi (France) Peugeot Total; Peugeot 206 WRC

The 2002 Rallye Sanremo (formally the 44th Rallye Sanremo - Rallye d'Italia) was the eleventh round of the 2002 World Rally Championship. The race was held over three days between 20 September and 22 September 2002, and was won by Peugeot's Gilles Panizzi, his 6th win in the World Rally Championship.

== Background ==
=== Entry list ===
No.	Driver	Co-Driver	Entrant	Car	Tyre
World Rally Championship manufacturer entries
1	(United Kingdom) Richard Burns	(United Kingdom) Robert Reid	(France) Peugeot Total	Peugeot 206 WRC	MI
2	(Finland) Marcus Grönholm	(Finland) Timo Rautiainen	(France) Peugeot Total	Peugeot 206 WRC	MI
3	(France) Gilles Panizzi	(France) Hervé Panizzi	(France) Peugeot Total	Peugeot 206 WRC	MI
4	(Spain) Carlos Sainz	(Spain) Luis Moya	(United Kingdom) Ford Motor Co. Ltd.	Ford Focus RS WRC '02	P
5	(United Kingdom) Colin McRae	(United Kingdom) Nicky Grist	(United Kingdom) Ford Motor Co. Ltd.	Ford Focus RS WRC '02	P
6	(Estonia) Markko Märtin	(United Kingdom) Michael Park	(United Kingdom) Ford Motor Co. Ltd.	Ford Focus RS WRC '02	P
7	(France) François Delecour	(France) Daniel Grataloup	(Japan) Marlboro Mitsubishi Ralliart	Mitsubishi Lancer WRC2	MI
8	(United Kingdom) Alister McRae	(United Kingdom) David Senior	(Japan) Marlboro Mitsubishi Ralliart	Mitsubishi Lancer WRC2	MI
10	(Finland) Tommi Mäkinen	(Finland) Kaj Lindström	(Japan) 555 Subaru World Rally Team	Subaru Impreza S8 WRC '02	P
11	(Norway) Petter Solberg	(United Kingdom) Phil Mills	(Japan) 555 Subaru World Rally Team	Subaru Impreza S8 WRC '02	P
12	(Austria) Achim Mörtl	(Germany) Klaus Wicha	(Japan) 555 Subaru World Rally Team	Subaru Impreza S8 WRC '02	P
14	(Sweden) Kenneth Eriksson	(Sweden) Tina Thörner	(Czech Republic) Škoda Motorsport	Škoda Octavia WRC Evo3	MI
15	(Finland) Toni Gardemeister	(Finland) Paavo Lukander	(Czech Republic) Škoda Motorsport	Škoda Octavia WRC Evo3	MI
16	(Czech Republic) Roman Kresta	(Czech Republic) Jan Tománek	(Czech Republic) Škoda Motorsport	Škoda Octavia WRC Evo3	MI
17	(Germany) Armin Schwarz	(Germany) Manfred Hiemer	(South Korea) Hyundai Castrol World Rally Team	Hyundai Accent WRC3	MI
18	(Belgium) Freddy Loix	(Belgium) Sven Smeets	(South Korea) Hyundai Castrol World Rally Team	Hyundai Accent WRC3	MI
World Rally Championship entries
24	(France) Philippe Bugalski	(France) Jean-Paul Chiaroni	(France) Piedrafita Sport	Citroën Xsara WRC	MI
25	(Finland) Harri Rovanperä	(Finland) Voitto Silander	(France) Bozian Racing	Peugeot 206 WRC	MI
26	(Belgium) Bruno Thiry	(Belgium) Stéphane Prévot	(Belgium) Peugeot Bastos Racing	Peugeot 206 WRC	MI
27	(Spain) Jesús Puras	(Spain) Carlos del Barrio	(France) Piedrafita Sport	Citroën Xsara WRC	MI
28	(France) Cédric Robert	(France) Gérald Bedon	(France) Bozian Racing	Peugeot 206 WRC	MI
104	(Italy) Riccardo Errani	(Italy) Stefano Casadio	(Italy) Riccardo Errani	Subaru Impreza WRX	—N/a
JWRC entries
51	(Italy) Andrea Dallavilla	(Italy) Giovanni Bernacchini	(Italy) Vieffe Corse SRL	Citroën Saxo S1600	MI
52	(United Kingdom) Niall McShea	(United Kingdom) Michael Orr	(Germany) Opel Motorsport	Opel Corsa S1600	MI
53	(Italy) Giandomenico Basso	(Italy) Luigi Pirollo	(Italy) Top Run SRL	Fiat Punto S1600	MI
55	(Belgium) François Duval	(Belgium) Jean-Marc Fortin	(United Kingdom) Ford Motor Co. Ltd.	Ford Puma S1600	MI
56	(Finland) Jussi Välimäki	(Finland) Tero Gardemeister	(France) Citroën Sport	Citroën Saxo S1600	MI
57	(Paraguay) Alejandro Galanti	(Spain) Xavier Amigó	(Italy) Astra Racing	Ford Puma S1600	MI
58	(Italy) Christian Chemin	(Italy) Simone Scattolin	(Italy) Hawk Racing Club	Fiat Punto S1600	MI
59	(Finland) Juha Kangas	(Finland) Jani Laaksonen	(Japan) Suzuki Sport	Suzuki Ignis S1600	MI
60	(Italy) Nicola Caldani	(Italy) Dario D'Esposito	(Italy) Procar Rally Team	Fiat Punto S1600	MI
61	(United Kingdom) Gwyndaf Evans	(United Kingdom) Chris Patterson	(United Kingdom) MG Sport & Racing	MG ZR S1600	P
62	(Finland) Janne Tuohino	(Finland) Petri Vihavainen	(France) Citroën Sport	Citroën Saxo S1600	MI
63	(United Kingdom) Martin Rowe	(United Kingdom) Chris Wood	(Italy) Astra Racing	Ford Puma S1600	MI
64	(Italy) Gianluigi Galli	(Italy) Guido D'Amore	(Italy) Top Run SRL	Fiat Punto S1600	MI
65	(Spain) Daniel Solà	(Spain) Álex Romaní	(France) Citroën Sport	Citroën Saxo S1600	MI
66	(San Marino) Mirco Baldacci	(Italy) Maurizio Barone	(Italy) Vieffe Corse SRL	Citroën Saxo S1600	MI
67	(Sweden) Daniel Carlsson	(Sweden) Mattias Andersson	(Italy) Astra Racing	Ford Puma S1600	MI
68	(Germany) Nikolaus Schelle	(Germany) Tanja Geilhausen	(Japan) Suzuki Sport	Suzuki Ignis S1600	MI
69	(Finland) Kosti Katajamäki	(Finland) Jakke Honkanen	(Germany) Volkswagen Racing	Volkswagen Polo S1600	MI
70	(Germany) Sven Haaf	(Germany) Michael Kölbach	(Germany) Opel Motorsport	Opel Corsa S1600	MI
71	(Austria) David Doppelreiter	(Norway) Ola Fløene	(Austria) Schmidt Racing	Peugeot 206 S1600	MI
73	(Andorra) Albert Lloverá	(Spain) Marc Corral	(Spain) Pronto Racing	Fiat Punto S1600	MI
75	(Japan) Kazuhiko Niwa	(Germany) Gerhard Weiss	(Japan) Suzuki Sport	Suzuki Ignis S1600	MI
76	(Norway) Alexander Foss	(United Kingdom) Richard Pashley	(United Kingdom) Ford Motor Co. Ltd.	Ford Puma S1600	MI
78	(Lebanon) Roger Feghali	(Italy) Nicola Arena	(Italy) Astra Racing	Ford Puma S1600	MI

=== Itinerary ===
All dates and times are CEST (UTC+2).

Date	Time	No.	Stage name	Distance
Leg 1 — 147.25 km
20 September	08:07	SS1	Passo Teglia 1	14.44 km
20 September	08:32	SS2	Passo Drego 1	26.46 km
20 September	09:40	SS3	Ghimbegna 1	10.44 km
20 September	12:09	SS4	Cosio 1	19.19 km
20 September	12:55	SS5	San Bartolomeo 1	25.38 km
20 September	15:33	SS6	Passo Teglia 2	14.44 km
20 September	15:58	SS7	Passo Drego 2	26.46 km
20 September	17:06	SS8	Ghimbegna 2	10.44 km
Leg 2 — 150.57 km
21 September	08:25	SS9	San Romolo 1	10.69 km
21 September	09:18	SS10	Colle Langan 1	42.31 km
21 September	12:09	SS11	Cosio 2	19.19 km
21 September	12:55	SS12	San Bartolomeo 2	25.38 km
21 September	15:51	SS13	San Romolo 2	10.69 km
21 September	16:44	SS14	Colle Langan 2	42.31 km
Leg 3 — 88.02 km
22 September	07:57	SS15	Pantasina 1	25.03 km
22 September	08:50	SS16	Mendatica 1	18.98 km
22 September	11:28	SS17	Pantasina 2	25.03 km
22 September	12:21	SS18	Mendatica 2	18.98 km

== Results ==
=== Overall ===
Pos.	No.	Driver	Co-driver	Team	Car	Time	Difference	Points
1	3	(France) Gilles Panizzi	(France) Hervé Panizzi	(France) Peugeot Total	Peugeot 206 WRC	4:10:15.6		10
2	2	(Finland) Marcus Grönholm	(Finland) Timo Rautiainen	(France) Peugeot Total	Peugeot 206 WRC	4:10:36.5	+20.9	6
3	11	(Norway) Petter Solberg	(United Kingdom) Phil Mills	(Japan) 555 Subaru World Rally Team	Subaru Impreza S8 WRC '02	4:11:22.0	+1:06.4	4
4	1	(United Kingdom) Richard Burns	(United Kingdom) Robert Reid	(France) Peugeot Total	Peugeot 206 WRC	4:11:34.5	+1:18.9	3
5	6	(Estonia) Markko Märtin	(United Kingdom) Michael Park	(United Kingdom) Ford Motor Co. Ltd.	Ford Focus RS WRC '02	4:12:10.5	+1:54.9	2
6	27	(Spain) Jesús Puras	(Spain) Carlos del Barrio	(France) Piedrafita Sport	Citroën Xsara WRC	4:12:54.9	+2:39.3	1

=== World Rally Cars ===
==== Classification ====
Position		No.	Driver	Co-driver	Entrant	Car	Time	Difference	Points
Event	Class	No.	Driver	Co-driver	Entrant	Car	Time	Difference	Points
1	1	3	(France) Gilles Panizzi	(France) Hervé Panizzi	(France) Peugeot Total	Peugeot 206 WRC	4:10:15.6		10
2	2	2	(Finland) Marcus Grönholm	(Finland) Timo Rautiainen	(France) Peugeot Total	Peugeot 206 WRC	4:10:36.5	+20.9	6
3	3	11	(Norway) Petter Solberg	(United Kingdom) Phil Mills	(Japan) 555 Subaru World Rally Team	Subaru Impreza S8 WRC '02	4:11:22.0	+1:06.4	4
4	4	1	(United Kingdom) Richard Burns	(United Kingdom) Robert Reid	(France) Peugeot Total	Peugeot 206 WRC	4:11:34.5	+1:18.9	3
5	5	6	(Estonia) Markko Märtin	(United Kingdom) Michael Park	(United Kingdom) Ford Motor Co. Ltd.	Ford Focus RS WRC '02	4:12:10.5	+1:54.9	2
8	6	5	(United Kingdom) Colin McRae	(United Kingdom) Nicky Grist	(United Kingdom) Ford Motor Co. Ltd.	Ford Focus RS WRC '02	4:15:33.1	+5:17.5	1
10	7	7	(France) François Delecour	(France) Daniel Grataloup	(Japan) Marlboro Mitsubishi Ralliart	Mitsubishi Lancer WRC2	4:17:40.0	+7:24.4	0
11	8	14	(Sweden) Kenneth Eriksson	(Sweden) Tina Thörner	(Czech Republic) Škoda Motorsport	Škoda Octavia WRC Evo3	4:19:34.3	+9:18.7	0
12	9	16	(Czech Republic) Roman Kresta	(Czech Republic) Jan Tománek	(Czech Republic) Škoda Motorsport	Škoda Octavia WRC Evo3	4:20:34.0	+10:18.4	0
28	10	18	(Belgium) Freddy Loix	(Belgium) Sven Smeets	(South Korea) Hyundai Castrol World Rally Team	Hyundai Accent WRC3	4:39:11.5	+28:55.9	0
Retired SS14		15	(Finland) Toni Gardemeister	(Finland) Paavo Lukander	(Czech Republic) Škoda Motorsport	Škoda Octavia WRC Evo3	Accident		0
Retired SS11		12	(Austria) Achim Mörtl	(Germany) Klaus Wicha	(Japan) 555 Subaru World Rally Team	Subaru Impreza S8 WRC '02	Driver injury		0
Retired SS9		8	(United Kingdom) Alister McRae	(United Kingdom) David Senior	(Japan) Marlboro Mitsubishi Ralliart	Mitsubishi Lancer WRC2	Driver injury		0
Retired SS8		10	(Finland) Tommi Mäkinen	(Finland) Kaj Lindström	(Japan) 555 Subaru World Rally Team	Subaru Impreza S8 WRC '02	Transmission		0
Retired SS4		4	(Spain) Carlos Sainz	(Spain) Luis Moya	(United Kingdom) Ford Motor Co. Ltd.	Ford Focus RS WRC '02	Oil leak		0
Retired SS1		17	(Germany) Armin Schwarz	(Germany) Manfred Hiemer	(South Korea) Hyundai Castrol World Rally Team	Hyundai Accent WRC3	Accident		0

==== Special stages ====
Day	Stage	Stage name	Length	Winner	Car	Time	Class leaders
Leg 1 (20 Sep)	SS1	Passo Teglia 1	14.44 km	(Finland) Marcus Grönholm	Peugeot 206 WRC	10:23.5	(Finland) Marcus Grönholm
Leg 1 (20 Sep)	SS2	Passo Drego 1	26.46 km	(France) Gilles Panizzi	Peugeot 206 WRC	17:41.9	(France) Gilles Panizzi
Leg 1 (20 Sep)	SS3	Ghimbegna 1	10.44 km	(France) Gilles Panizzi	Peugeot 206 WRC	6:38.9	(France) Gilles Panizzi
Leg 1 (20 Sep)	SS4	Cosio 1	19.19 km	(France) Gilles Panizzi	Peugeot 206 WRC	12:13.0	(France) Gilles Panizzi
Leg 1 (20 Sep)	SS5	San Bartolomeo 1	25.38 km	(France) Gilles Panizzi	Peugeot 206 WRC	15:03.7	(France) Gilles Panizzi
Leg 1 (20 Sep)	SS6	Passo Teglia 2	14.44 km	(France) Gilles Panizzi	Peugeot 206 WRC	10:19.4	(France) Gilles Panizzi
Leg 1 (20 Sep)	SS7	Passo Drego 2	26.46 km	(France) Gilles Panizzi	Peugeot 206 WRC	17:30.0	(France) Gilles Panizzi
Leg 1 (20 Sep)	SS8	Ghimbegna 2	10.44 km	(France) Gilles Panizzi	Peugeot 206 WRC	6:40.4	(France) Gilles Panizzi
Leg 2 (21 Sep)	SS9	San Romolo 1	10.69 km	(Finland) Marcus Grönholm	Peugeot 206 WRC	6:45.6	(France) Gilles Panizzi
Leg 2 (21 Sep)	SS10	Colle Langan 1	42.31 km	(Finland) Marcus Grönholm (France) Gilles Panizzi	Peugeot 206 WRC; Peugeot 206 WRC	28:52.8	(France) Gilles Panizzi
Leg 2 (21 Sep)	SS11	Cosio 2	19.19 km	(Finland) Marcus Grönholm	Peugeot 206 WRC	12:11.4	(France) Gilles Panizzi
Leg 2 (21 Sep)	SS12	San Bartolomeo 2	25.38 km	(France) Gilles Panizzi	Peugeot 206 WRC	15:03.3	(France) Gilles Panizzi
Leg 2 (21 Sep)	SS13	San Romolo 2	10.69 km	(Norway) Petter Solberg	Subaru Impreza S8 WRC '02	7:03.1	(France) Gilles Panizzi
Leg 2 (21 Sep)	SS14	Colle Langan 2	42.31 km	(Norway) Petter Solberg	Subaru Impreza S8 WRC '02	28:59.9	(France) Gilles Panizzi
Leg 3 (22 Sep)	SS15	Pantasina 1	25.03 km	(Norway) Petter Solberg	Subaru Impreza S8 WRC '02	14:55.2	(France) Gilles Panizzi
Leg 3 (22 Sep)	SS16	Mendatica 1	18.98 km	(Finland) Marcus Grönholm	Peugeot 206 WRC	12:03.0	(France) Gilles Panizzi
Leg 3 (22 Sep)	SS17	Pantasina 2	25.03 km	(United Kingdom) Richard Burns	Peugeot 206 WRC	14:51.4	(France) Gilles Panizzi
Leg 3 (22 Sep)	SS18	Mendatica 2	18.98 km	(Finland) Marcus Grönholm	Peugeot 206 WRC	12:01.0	(France) Gilles Panizzi

==== Championship standings ====
Pos.	Drivers' championships			Co-drivers' championships			Manufacturers' championships		
Pos.	Move	Driver	Points	Move	Co-driver	Points	Move	Manufacturer	Points
1		(Finland) Marcus Grönholm	57		(Finland) Timo Rautiainen	57		(France) Peugeot Total	131
2	1	(United Kingdom) Richard Burns	34	1	(United Kingdom) Robert Reid	34		(United Kingdom) Ford Motor Co. Ltd.	86
3	1	(United Kingdom) Colin McRae	33	1	(United Kingdom) Nicky Grist	33		(Japan) 555 Subaru World Rally Team	46
4	1	(France) Gilles Panizzi	31	1	(France) Hervé Panizzi	31	1	(Japan) Marlboro Mitsubishi Ralliart	9
5	1	(Spain) Carlos Sainz	26	1	(Spain) Luis Moya	26	1	(Czech Republic) Škoda Motorsport	8

=== Junior World Rally Championship ===
==== Classification ====
Position		No.	Driver	Co-driver	Entrant	Car	Time	Difference	Points
Event	Class	No.	Driver	Co-driver	Entrant	Car	Time	Difference	Points
15	1	51	(Italy) Andrea Dallavilla	(Italy) Giovanni Bernacchini	(Italy) Vieffe Corse SRL	Citroën Saxo S1600	4:28:26.4		10
16	2	53	(Italy) Giandomenico Basso	(Italy) Luigi Pirollo	(Italy) Top Run SRL	Fiat Punto S1600	4:28:36.0	+9.6	6
17	3	65	(Spain) Daniel Solà	(Spain) Álex Romaní	(France) Citroën Sport	Citroën Saxo S1600	4:28:56.1	+29.7	4
18	4	60	(Italy) Nicola Caldani	(Italy) Dario D'Esposito	(Italy) Procar Rally Team	Fiat Punto S1600	4:28:56.5	+30.1	3
19	5	64	(Italy) Gianluigi Galli	(Italy) Guido D'Amore	(Italy) Top Run SRL	Fiat Punto S1600	4:30:34.6	+2:08.2	2
20	6	55	(Belgium) François Duval	(Belgium) Jean-Marc Fortin	(United Kingdom) Ford Motor Co. Ltd.	Ford Puma S1600	4:31:29.4	+3:03.0	1
21	7	68	(Germany) Nikolaus Schelle	(Germany) Tanja Geilhausen	(Japan) Suzuki Sport	Suzuki Ignis S1600	4:32:46.1	+4:19.7	0
22	8	78	(Lebanon) Roger Feghali	(Italy) Nicola Arena	(Italy) Astra Racing	Ford Puma S1600	4:33:55.5	+5:29.1	0
23	9	56	(Finland) Jussi Välimäki	(Finland) Tero Gardemeister	(France) Citroën Sport	Citroën Saxo S1600	4:35:15.0	+6:48.6	0
24	10	62	(Finland) Janne Tuohino	(Finland) Petri Vihavainen	(France) Citroën Sport	Citroën Saxo S1600	4:36:18.8	+7:52.4	0
25	11	52	(United Kingdom) Niall McShea	(United Kingdom) Michael Orr	(Germany) Opel Motorsport	Opel Corsa S1600	4:36:23.5	+7:57.1	0
26	12	61	(United Kingdom) Gwyndaf Evans	(United Kingdom) Chris Patterson	(United Kingdom) MG Sport & Racing	MG ZR S1600	4:38:30.2	+10:03.8	0
27	13	66	(San Marino) Mirco Baldacci	(Italy) Maurizio Barone	(Italy) Vieffe Corse SRL	Citroën Saxo S1600	4:39:10.8	+10:44.4	0
29	14	59	(Finland) Juha Kangas	(Finland) Jani Laaksonen	(Japan) Suzuki Sport	Suzuki Ignis S1600	4:43:48.8	+15:22.4	0
31	15	76	(Norway) Alexander Foss	(United Kingdom) Richard Pashley	(United Kingdom) Ford Motor Co. Ltd.	Ford Puma S1600	4:45:27.5	+17:01.1	0
33	16	73	(Andorra) Albert Lloverá	(Spain) Marc Corral	(Spain) Pronto Racing	Fiat Punto S1600	4:50:38.0	+22:11.6	0
Retired SS14		63	(United Kingdom) Martin Rowe	(United Kingdom) Chris Wood	(Italy) Astra Racing	Ford Puma S1600	Accident		0
Retired SS14		75	(Japan) Kazuhiko Niwa	(Germany) Gerhard Weiss	(Japan) Suzuki Sport	Suzuki Ignis S1600	Accident		0
Retired SS13		69	(Finland) Kosti Katajamäki	(Finland) Jakke Honkanen	(Germany) Volkswagen Racing	Volkswagen Polo S1600	Gearbox		0
Retired SS8		67	(Sweden) Daniel Carlsson	(Sweden) Mattias Andersson	(Italy) Astra Racing	Ford Puma S1600	Lost wheel		0
Retired SS7		58	(Italy) Christian Chemin	(Italy) Simone Scattolin	(Italy) Hawk Racing Club	Fiat Punto S1600	Engine		0
Retired SS7		71	(Austria) David Doppelreiter	(Norway) Ola Fløene	(Austria) Schmidt Racing	Peugeot 206 S1600	Accident		0
Retired SS4		70	(Germany) Sven Haaf	(Germany) Michael Kölbach	(Germany) Opel Motorsport	Opel Corsa S1600	Accident damage		0
Retired SS2		57	(Paraguay) Alejandro Galanti	(Spain) Xavier Amigó	(Italy) Astra Racing	Ford Puma S1600	Engine		0

==== Special stages ====
Day	Stage	Stage name	Length	Winner	Car	Time	Class leaders
Leg 1 (20 Sep)	SS1	Passo Teglia 1	14.44 km	(Belgium) François Duval	Ford Puma S1600	11:21.2	(Belgium) François Duval
Leg 1 (20 Sep)	SS2	Passo Drego 1	26.46 km	(Italy) Andrea Dallavilla	Citroën Saxo S1600	19:05.8	(Italy) Andrea Dallavilla
Leg 1 (20 Sep)	SS3	Ghimbegna 1	10.44 km	(Italy) Gianluigi Galli	Fiat Punto S1600	7:12.2	(Italy) Andrea Dallavilla
Leg 1 (20 Sep)	SS4	Cosio 1	19.19 km	(Italy) Giandomenico Basso (Spain) Daniel Solà	Fiat Punto S1600; Citroën Saxo S1600	13:18.3	(Italy) Andrea Dallavilla
Leg 1 (20 Sep)	SS5	San Bartolomeo 1	25.38 km	(Italy) Gianluigi Galli	Fiat Punto S1600	16:20.4	(Italy) Nicola Caldani
Leg 1 (20 Sep)	SS6	Passo Teglia 2	14.44 km	(Italy) Andrea Dallavilla	Citroën Saxo S1600	11:18.3	(Italy) Andrea Dallavilla
Leg 1 (20 Sep)	SS7	Passo Drego 2	26.46 km	(Spain) Daniel Solà	Citroën Saxo S1600	18:53.2	(Italy) Nicola Caldani
Leg 1 (20 Sep)	SS8	Ghimbegna 2	10.44 km	(Spain) Daniel Solà	Citroën Saxo S1600	7:11.1	(Italy) Nicola Caldani
Leg 2 (21 Sep)	SS9	San Romolo 1	10.69 km	(Italy) Giandomenico Basso	Fiat Punto S1600	7:18.5	(Italy) Nicola Caldani
Leg 2 (21 Sep)	SS10	Colle Langan 1	42.31 km	Notional stage time			(Italy) Nicola Caldani
Leg 2 (21 Sep)	SS11	Cosio 2	19.19 km	(Italy) Andrea Dallavilla	Citroën Saxo S1600	13:12.6	(Italy) Andrea Dallavilla
Leg 2 (21 Sep)	SS12	San Bartolomeo 2	25.38 km	(Italy) Giandomenico Basso	Fiat Punto S1600	16:16.9	(Italy) Andrea Dallavilla
Leg 2 (21 Sep)	SS13	San Romolo 2	10.69 km	(Italy) Giandomenico Basso	Fiat Punto S1600	7:33.3	(Italy) Andrea Dallavilla
Leg 2 (21 Sep)	SS14	Colle Langan 2	42.31 km	(Spain) Daniel Solà	Citroën Saxo S1600	31:09.9	(Italy) Andrea Dallavilla
Leg 3 (22 Sep)	SS15	Pantasina 1	25.03 km	(Italy) Giandomenico Basso	Fiat Punto S1600	15:54.2	(Italy) Andrea Dallavilla
Leg 3 (22 Sep)	SS16	Mendatica 1	18.98 km	(Italy) Andrea Dallavilla	Citroën Saxo S1600	12:57.6	(Italy) Andrea Dallavilla
Leg 3 (22 Sep)	SS17	Pantasina 2	25.03 km	(Italy) Giandomenico Basso	Fiat Punto S1600	15:50.1	(Italy) Andrea Dallavilla
Leg 3 (22 Sep)	SS18	Mendatica 2	18.98 km	(Spain) Daniel Solà	Citroën Saxo S1600	12:52.5	(Italy) Andrea Dallavilla

==== Championship standings ====
Pos.	Drivers' championships		
Pos.	Move	Driver	Points
1	1	(Italy) Andrea Dallavilla	28
2	1	(Spain) Daniel Solà	27
3	2	(Italy) Nicola Caldani	13
4	1	(Finland) Janne Tuohino	12
5	1	(Belgium) François Duval	12
