= 2003 Rally Argentina =

5th round of the 2003 World Rally Championship

2003 Rally Argentina 23rd YPF Rally Argentina
Round 5 of the 2003 World Rally Championship season
← Previous event	Next event →
- Host country: Argentina
- Rally base: Villa Carlos Paz
- Dates run: May 8, 2003 – May 11, 2003
- Stages: 25 (402.35 km; 250.01 miles)
- Stage surface: Gravel
- Overall distance: 1,370.00 km (851.28 miles)

Statistics
- Crews: 78 at start, 33 at finish

Overall results
- Overall winner: (Finland) Marcus Grönholm (Finland) Timo Rautiainen (France) Marlboro Peugeot Total; Peugeot 206 WRC

The 2003 Rally Argentina (formally the 23rd YPF Rally Argentina) was the fifth round of the 2003 World Rally Championship. The race was held over four days between 8 May and 11 May 2003, and was based in Villa Carlos Paz, Argentina. Peugeot's Marcus Grönholm won the race, his 15th win in the World Rally Championship.

== Background ==
=== Entry list ===
No.	Driver	Co-Driver	Entrant	Car	Tyre
World Rally Championship manufacturer entries
1	(Finland) Marcus Grönholm	(Finland) Timo Rautiainen	(France) Marlboro Peugeot Total	Peugeot 206 WRC	MI
2	(United Kingdom) Richard Burns	(United Kingdom) Robert Reid	(France) Marlboro Peugeot Total	Peugeot 206 WRC	MI
3	(Finland) Harri Rovanperä	(Finland) Risto Pietiläinen	(France) Marlboro Peugeot Total	Peugeot 206 WRC	MI
4	(Estonia) Markko Märtin	(United Kingdom) Michael Park	(United Kingdom) Ford Motor Co. Ltd.	Ford Focus RS WRC '03	MI
5	(Belgium) François Duval	(Belgium) Stéphane Prévot	(United Kingdom) Ford Motor Co. Ltd.	Ford Focus RS WRC '03	MI
6	(Finland) Mikko Hirvonen	(Finland) Jarmo Lehtinen	(United Kingdom) Ford Motor Co. Ltd.	Ford Focus RS WRC '02	MI
7	(Norway) Petter Solberg	(United Kingdom) Phil Mills	(Japan) 555 Subaru World Rally Team	Subaru Impreza S9 WRC '03	P
8	(Finland) Tommi Mäkinen	(Finland) Kaj Lindström	(Japan) 555 Subaru World Rally Team	Subaru Impreza S9 WRC '03	P
10	(Germany) Armin Schwarz	(Germany) Manfred Hiemer	(South Korea) Hyundai World Rally Team	Hyundai Accent WRC3	MI
11	(Belgium) Freddy Loix	(Belgium) Sven Smeets	(South Korea) Hyundai World Rally Team	Hyundai Accent WRC3	MI
14	(France) Didier Auriol	(France) Denis Giraudet	(Czech Republic) Škoda Motorsport	Škoda Octavia WRC Evo3	MI
15	(Finland) Toni Gardemeister	(Finland) Paavo Lukander	(Czech Republic) Škoda Motorsport	Škoda Octavia WRC Evo3	MI
17	(United Kingdom) Colin McRae	(United Kingdom) Derek Ringer	(France) Citroën Total WRT	Citroën Xsara WRC	MI
18	(France) Sébastien Loeb	(Monaco) Daniel Elena	(France) Citroën Total WRT	Citroën Xsara WRC	MI
19	(Spain) Carlos Sainz	(Spain) Marc Martí	(France) Citroën Total WRT	Citroën Xsara WRC	MI
World Rally Championship entries
21	(Germany) Antony Warmbold	(United Kingdom) Gemma Price	(Germany) AW Rally Team	Ford Focus RS WRC '02	—N/a
32	(Argentina) Gabriel Pozzo	(Argentina) Daniel Stillo	(Argentina) Gabriel Pozzo	Škoda Octavia WRC Evo3	—N/a
33	(Argentina) Gabriel Raies	(Argentina) Jorge Perez Companc	(Argentina) Gabriel Raies	Toyota Corolla WRC	—N/a
127	(Argentina) Martin Galluser	(Argentina) Juan Carlos Uberti	(Argentina) Martin Galluser	Mitsubishi Lancer Evo III	—N/a
PWRC entries
51	(Malaysia) Karamjit Singh	(Malaysia) Allen Oh	(Malaysia) Petronas EON Racing Team	Proton Pert	—N/a
52	(Spain) Daniel Solà	(Spain) Álex Romaní	(Italy) Mauro Rally Tuning	Mitsubishi Lancer Evo VII	P
53	(Peru) Ramón Ferreyros	(Mexico) Javier Marín	(Italy) Mauro Rally Tuning	Mitsubishi Lancer Evo VII	—N/a
54	(Japan) Toshihiro Arai	(New Zealand) Tony Sircombe	(Japan) Subaru Production Rally Team	Subaru Impreza WRX STI N10	—N/a
57	(Italy) Giovanni Manfrinato	(Italy) Claudio Condotta	(Italy) Top Run SRL	Mitsubishi Lancer Evo VI	P
58	(Argentina) Marcos Ligato	(Argentina) Rubén García	(Italy) Top Run SRL	Mitsubishi Lancer Evo VII	—N/a
59	(Italy) Stefano Marrini	(Italy) Massimo Agostinelli	(Italy) Top Run SRL	Mitsubishi Lancer Evo VII	—N/a
60	(United Kingdom) Niall McShea	(United Kingdom) Chris Patterson	(New Zealand) Neil Allport Motorsports	Mitsubishi Lancer Evo VI	MI
66	(Oman) Hamed Al-Wahaibi	(United Kingdom) Nicky Beech	Oman Arab World Rally Team	Mitsubishi Lancer Evo VII	—N/a
69	(Belgium) Bob Colsoul	(Belgium) Tom Colsoul	(Belgium) Guy Colsoul Rallysport	Mitsubishi Lancer Evo VII	—N/a
70	(Italy) Riccardo Errani	(Italy) Stefano Casadio	(Italy) Errani Team Group	Mitsubishi Lancer Evo VI	—N/a
71	(Bulgaria) Georgi Geradzhiev Jr.	(Bulgaria) Nikola Popov	(Bulgaria) Racing Team Bulgartabac	Mitsubishi Lancer Evo VI	—N/a
74	(Italy) Fabio Frisiero	(Italy) Giovanni Agnese	(Italy) Motoring Club	Mitsubishi Lancer Evo VII	—N/a
76	(Canada) Patrick Richard	(Sweden) Mikael Johansson	Subaru Rally Team Canada	Subaru Impreza WRX	—N/a
77	(Italy) Alfredo De Dominicis	(Italy) Giovanni Bernacchini	Ralliart Italy	Mitsubishi Lancer Evo VII	—N/a
80	(Mexico) Ricardo Triviño	(Argentina) Jorge Gonzalez	(Mexico) Triviño Racing	Mitsubishi Lancer Evo VII	—N/a

=== Itinerary ===
All dates and times are ART (UTC−3).

Date	Time	No.	Stage name	Distance
Leg 1 — 175.14 km
8 May	19:35	SS1	Complejo Pro-Racing (Lane A)	3.02 km
8 May	19:40	SS2	Complejo Pro-Racing (Lane B)	3.02 km
9 May	08:50	SS3	El Reposo — Los Sauces 1	10.03 km
9 May	09:17	SS4	Canada de Rio Pinto — Villa Albertina 1	10.91 km
9 May	09:39	SS5	Villa Albertina — Ischilin 1	15.17 km
9 May	10:11	SS6	Museo Fader — Ongamira 1	18.49 km
9 May	12:02	SS7	La Falda — Villa Giardino 1	9.37 km
9 May	12:30	SS8	La Cumbre — Agua de Oro 1	21.70 km
9 May	13:20	SS9	Ascochinga — La Cumbre 1	28.83 km
9 May	15:32	SS10	El Reposo — Los Sauces 2	10.03 km
9 May	15:59	SS11	Canada de Rio Pinto — Villa Albertina 2	10.91 km
9 May	16:21	SS12	Villa Albertina — Ischilin 2	15.17 km
9 May	16:53	SS13	Museo Fader — Ongamira 2	18.49 km
Leg 2 — 121.72 km
10 May	08:50	SS14	Capilla del Monte — San Marcos Sierra 1	23.02 km
10 May	09:23	SS15	San Marcos Sierra — Charbonier 1	9.61 km
10 May	10:14	SS16	San Marcos Sierra — Cuchi Corral 1	22.57 km
10 May	11:58	SS17	Cosquin — Villa Allende	19.19 km
10 May	13:08	SS18	Carlos Paz — Cabalango	14.81 km
10 May	13:36	SS19	Tanti — Cosquin	9.50 km
10 May	15:34	SS20	Capilla del Monte — San Marcos Sierra 2	23.02 km
Leg 3 — 105.49 km
11 May	08:30	SS21	Capilla del Monte — San Marcos Sierra 3	23.02 km
11 May	09:00	SS22	San Marcos Sierra — Cuchi Corral 2	22.57 km
11 May	10:32	SS23	La Falda — Villa Giardino 2	9.37 km
11 May	11:00	SS24	La Cumbre — Agua de Oro 2	21.70 km
11 May	11:50	SS25	Ascochinga — La Cumbre 2	28.83 km

== Results ==
=== Overall ===
Pos.	No.	Driver	Co-driver	Team	Car	Time	Difference	Points
1	1	(Finland) Marcus Grönholm	(Finland) Timo Rautiainen	(France) Marlboro Peugeot Total	Peugeot 206 WRC	4:14:45.0		10
2	19	(Spain) Carlos Sainz	(Spain) Marc Martí	(France) Citroën Total WRT	Citroën Xsara WRC	4:15:11.6	+26.6	8
3	2	(United Kingdom) Richard Burns	(United Kingdom) Robert Reid	(France) Marlboro Peugeot Total	Peugeot 206 WRC	4:15:57.8	+1:12.8	6
4	3	(Finland) Harri Rovanperä	(Finland) Risto Pietiläinen	(France) Marlboro Peugeot Total	Peugeot 206 WRC	4:17:04.3	+2:19.3	5
5	7	(Norway) Petter Solberg	(United Kingdom) Phil Mills	(Japan) 555 Subaru World Rally Team	Subaru Impreza S9 WRC '03	4:17:56.4	+3:11.4	4
6	14	(France) Didier Auriol	(France) Denis Giraudet	(Czech Republic) Škoda Motorsport	Škoda Octavia WRC Evo3	4:22:43.5	+7:58.5	3
7	15	(Finland) Toni Gardemeister	(Finland) Paavo Lukander	(Czech Republic) Škoda Motorsport	Škoda Octavia WRC Evo3	4:23:18.7	+8:33.7	2
8	5	(Belgium) François Duval	(Belgium) Stéphane Prévot	(United Kingdom) Ford Motor Co. Ltd.	Ford Focus RS WRC '03	4:26:40.3	+11:55.3	1

=== World Rally Cars ===
==== Classification ====
Position		No.	Driver	Co-driver	Entrant	Car	Time	Difference	Points
Event	Class	No.	Driver	Co-driver	Entrant	Car	Time	Difference	Points
1	1	1	(Finland) Marcus Grönholm	(Finland) Timo Rautiainen	(France) Marlboro Peugeot Total	Peugeot 206 WRC	4:14:45.0		10
2	2	19	(Spain) Carlos Sainz	(Spain) Marc Martí	(France) Citroën Total WRT	Citroën Xsara WRC	4:15:11.6	+26.6	8
3	3	2	(United Kingdom) Richard Burns	(United Kingdom) Robert Reid	(France) Marlboro Peugeot Total	Peugeot 206 WRC	4:15:57.8	+1:12.8	6
4	4	3	(Finland) Harri Rovanperä	(Finland) Risto Pietiläinen	(France) Marlboro Peugeot Total	Peugeot 206 WRC	4:17:04.3	+2:19.3	5
5	5	7	(Norway) Petter Solberg	(United Kingdom) Phil Mills	(Japan) 555 Subaru World Rally Team	Subaru Impreza S9 WRC '03	4:17:56.4	+3:11.4	4
6	6	14	(France) Didier Auriol	(France) Denis Giraudet	(Czech Republic) Škoda Motorsport	Škoda Octavia WRC Evo3	4:22:43.5	+7:58.5	3
7	7	15	(Finland) Toni Gardemeister	(Finland) Paavo Lukander	(Czech Republic) Škoda Motorsport	Škoda Octavia WRC Evo3	4:23:18.7	+8:33.7	2
8	8	5	(Belgium) François Duval	(Belgium) Stéphane Prévot	(United Kingdom) Ford Motor Co. Ltd.	Ford Focus RS WRC '03	4:26:40.3	+11:55.3	1
16	9	6	(Finland) Mikko Hirvonen	(Finland) Jarmo Lehtinen	(United Kingdom) Ford Motor Co. Ltd.	Ford Focus RS WRC '02	4:51:37.4	+36:52.4	0
Retired SS24		10	(Germany) Armin Schwarz	(Germany) Manfred Hiemer	(South Korea) Hyundai World Rally Team	Hyundai Accent WRC3	Engine		0
Retired SS21		4	(Estonia) Markko Märtin	(United Kingdom) Michael Park	(United Kingdom) Ford Motor Co. Ltd.	Ford Focus RS WRC '03	Oil pressure		0
Retired SS21		8	(Finland) Tommi Mäkinen	(Finland) Kaj Lindström	(Japan) 555 Subaru World Rally Team	Subaru Impreza S9 WRC '03	Withdrawn		0
Retired SS20		18	(France) Sébastien Loeb	(Monaco) Daniel Elena	(France) Citroën Total WRT	Citroën Xsara WRC	Accident		0
Retired SS9		17	(United Kingdom) Colin McRae	(United Kingdom) Derek Ringer	(France) Citroën Total WRT	Citroën Xsara WRC	Fire		0
Retired SS7		11	(Belgium) Freddy Loix	(Belgium) Sven Smeets	(South Korea) Hyundai World Rally Team	Hyundai Accent WRC3	Engine		0

==== Special stages ====
Day	Stage	Stage name	Length	Winner	Car	Time	Class leaders
Leg 1 (8 May)	SS1	Complejo Pro-Racing (Lane A)	3.02 km	(Finland) Marcus Grönholm	Peugeot 206 WRC	2:09.7	(Finland) Marcus Grönholm
Leg 1 (8 May)	SS2	Complejo Pro-Racing (Lane B)	3.02 km	(United Kingdom) Richard Burns	Peugeot 206 WRC	2:09.4	(Finland) Marcus Grönholm
Leg 1 (9 May)	SS3	El Reposo — Los Sauces 1	10.03 km	(Finland) Marcus Grönholm	Peugeot 206 WRC	5:44.9	(Finland) Marcus Grönholm
Leg 1 (9 May)	SS4	Canada de Rio Pinto — Villa Albertina 1	10.91 km	(Finland) Marcus Grönholm	Peugeot 206 WRC	7:43.4	(Finland) Marcus Grönholm
Leg 1 (9 May)	SS5	Villa Albertina — Ischilin 1	15.17 km	(Finland) Tommi Mäkinen	Subaru Impreza S9 WRC '03	8:54.5	(Finland) Marcus Grönholm
Leg 1 (9 May)	SS6	Museo Fader — Ongamira 1	18.49 km	(Spain) Carlos Sainz	Citroën Xsara WRC	10:12.7	(Finland) Marcus Grönholm
Leg 1 (9 May)	SS7	La Falda — Villa Giardino 1	9.37 km	(Spain) Carlos Sainz	Citroën Xsara WRC	6:25.1	(Finland) Marcus Grönholm
Leg 1 (9 May)	SS8	La Cumbre — Agua de Oro 1	21.70 km	(Finland) Harri Rovanperä	Peugeot 206 WRC	18:47.6	(Finland) Marcus Grönholm
Leg 1 (9 May)	SS9	Ascochinga — La Cumbre 1	28.83 km	(Spain) Carlos Sainz	Citroën Xsara WRC	19:07.4	(Spain) Carlos Sainz
Leg 1 (9 May)	SS10	El Reposo — Los Sauces 2	10.03 km	(Estonia) Markko Märtin	Ford Focus RS WRC '03	5:38.4	(Spain) Carlos Sainz
Leg 1 (9 May)	SS11	Canada de Rio Pinto — Villa Albertina 2	10.91 km	(Finland) Marcus Grönholm	Peugeot 206 WRC	7:38.2	(Spain) Carlos Sainz
Leg 1 (9 May)	SS12	Villa Albertina — Ischilin 2	15.17 km	(Finland) Marcus Grönholm	Peugeot 206 WRC	8:47.5	(Spain) Carlos Sainz
Leg 1 (9 May)	SS13	Museo Fader — Ongamira 2	18.49 km	(Estonia) Markko Märtin	Ford Focus RS WRC '03	9:49.6	(Spain) Carlos Sainz
Leg 2 (10 May)	SS14	Capilla del Monte — San Marcos Sierra 1	23.02 km	Stage cancelled			(Spain) Carlos Sainz
Leg 2 (10 May)	SS15	San Marcos Sierra — Charbonier 1	9.61 km	Notional stage time			(Spain) Carlos Sainz
Leg 2 (10 May)	SS16	San Marcos Sierra — Cuchi Corral 1	22.57 km	(Spain) Carlos Sainz	Citroën Xsara WRC	13:13.6	(Spain) Carlos Sainz
Leg 2 (10 May)	SS17	Cosquin — Villa Allende	19.19 km	(Finland) Marcus Grönholm	Peugeot 206 WRC	13:17.0	(Spain) Carlos Sainz
Leg 2 (10 May)	SS18	Carlos Paz — Cabalango	14.81 km	(Finland) Marcus Grönholm	Peugeot 206 WRC	10:08.3	(Spain) Carlos Sainz
Leg 2 (10 May)	SS19	Tanti — Cosquin	9.50 km	(Spain) Carlos Sainz	Citroën Xsara WRC	5:52.1	(Estonia) Markko Märtin
Leg 2 (10 May)	SS20	Capilla del Monte — San Marcos Sierra 2	23.02 km	(Finland) Marcus Grönholm	Peugeot 206 WRC	17:06.5	(Estonia) Markko Märtin
Leg 3 (11 May)	SS21	Capilla del Monte — San Marcos Sierra 3	23.02 km	(Finland) Marcus Grönholm	Peugeot 206 WRC	16:49.2	(Finland) Marcus Grönholm
Leg 3 (11 May)	SS22	San Marcos Sierra — Cuchi Corral 2	22.57 km	(Spain) Carlos Sainz	Citroën Xsara WRC	13:04.6	(Finland) Marcus Grönholm
Leg 3 (11 May)	SS23	La Falda — Villa Giardino 2	9.37 km	(Finland) Marcus Grönholm	Peugeot 206 WRC	6:24.4	(Finland) Marcus Grönholm
Leg 3 (11 May)	SS24	La Cumbre — Agua de Oro 2	21.70 km	(Finland) Marcus Grönholm	Peugeot 206 WRC	18:23.6	(Finland) Marcus Grönholm
Leg 3 (11 May)	SS25	Ascochinga — La Cumbre 2	28.83 km	(Spain) Carlos Sainz	Citroën Xsara WRC	18:36.5	(Finland) Marcus Grönholm

==== Championship standings ====
Pos.	Drivers' championships			Co-drivers' championships			Manufacturers' championships		
Pos.	Move	Driver	Points	Move	Co-driver	Points	Move	Manufacturer	Points
1		(United Kingdom) Richard Burns	32		(United Kingdom) Robert Reid	32		(France) Marlboro Peugeot Total	65
2		(Finland) Marcus Grönholm	30		(Finland) Timo Rautiainen	30		(France) Citroën Total WRT	52
3	2	(Spain) Carlos Sainz	24	2	(Spain) Marc Martí	24		(United Kingdom) Ford Motor Co. Ltd.	29
4	1	(France) Sébastien Loeb	17	1	(Monaco) Daniel Elena	17		(Japan) 555 Subaru World Rally Team	27
5	1	(United Kingdom) Colin McRae	17	1	(United Kingdom) Derek Ringer	17		(Czech Republic) Škoda Motorsport	19

=== Production World Rally Championship ===
==== Classification ====
Position		No.	Driver	Co-driver	Entrant	Car	Time	Difference	Points
Event	Class	No.	Driver	Co-driver	Entrant	Car	Time	Difference	Points
9	1	54	(Japan) Toshihiro Arai	(New Zealand) Tony Sircombe	(Japan) Subaru Production Rally Team	Subaru Impreza WRX STI N10	4:34:46.7		10
12	2	52	(Spain) Daniel Solà	(Spain) Álex Romaní	(Italy) Mauro Rally Tuning	Mitsubishi Lancer Evo VII	4:36:56.3	+2:09.6	8
13	3	51	(Malaysia) Karamjit Singh	(Malaysia) Allen Oh	(Malaysia) Petronas EON Racing Team	Proton Pert	4:38:13.4	+3:26.7	6
14	4	57	(Italy) Giovanni Manfrinato	(Italy) Claudio Condotta	(Italy) Top Run SRL	Mitsubishi Lancer Evo VI	4:39:11.9	+4:25.2	5
18	5	77	(Italy) Alfredo De Dominicis	(Italy) Giovanni Bernacchini	Ralliart Italy	Mitsubishi Lancer Evo VII	4:59:51.0	+25:04.3	4
22	6	80	(Mexico) Ricardo Triviño	(Argentina) Jorge Gonzalez	(Mexico) Triviño Racing	Mitsubishi Lancer Evo VII	5:16:34.3	+41:47.6	3
24	7	70	(Italy) Riccardo Errani	(Italy) Stefano Casadio	(Italy) Errani Team Group	Mitsubishi Lancer Evo VI	5:31:12.3	+56:25.6	2
Retired SS24		60	(United Kingdom) Niall McShea	(United Kingdom) Chris Patterson	(New Zealand) Neil Allport Motorsports	Mitsubishi Lancer Evo VI	Oil cooler		0
Retired SS15		74	(Italy) Fabio Frisiero	(Italy) Giovanni Agnese	(Italy) Motoring Club	Mitsubishi Lancer Evo VII	Mechanical		0
Retired SS10		76	(Canada) Patrick Richard	(Sweden) Mikael Johansson	Subaru Rally Team Canada	Subaru Impreza WRX	Driveshaft		0
Retired SS8		59	(Italy) Stefano Marrini	(Italy) Massimo Agostinelli	(Italy) Top Run SRL	Mitsubishi Lancer Evo VII	Mechanical		0
Retired SS8		71	(Bulgaria) Georgi Geradzhiev Jr.	(Bulgaria) Nikola Popov	(Bulgaria) Racing Team Bulgartabac	Mitsubishi Lancer Evo VI	Mechanical		0
Retired SS7		53	(Peru) Ramón Ferreyros	(Mexico) Javier Marín	(Italy) Mauro Rally Tuning	Mitsubishi Lancer Evo VII	Turbo		0
Retired SS6		58	(Argentina) Marcos Ligato	(Argentina) Rubén García	(Italy) Top Run SRL	Mitsubishi Lancer Evo VII	Turbo		0
Retired SS3		66	(Oman) Hamed Al-Wahaibi	(United Kingdom) Nicky Beech	Oman Arab World Rally Team	Mitsubishi Lancer Evo VII	Retired		0
Retired SS3		69	(Belgium) Bob Colsoul	(Belgium) Tom Colsoul	(Belgium) Guy Colsoul Rallysport	Mitsubishi Lancer Evo VII	Accident		0

==== Special stages ====
Day	Stage	Stage name	Length	Winner	Car	Time	Class leaders
Leg 1 (8 May)	SS1	Complejo Pro-Racing (Lane A)	3.02 km	(Argentina) Marcos Ligato	Mitsubishi Lancer Evo VII	2:19.4	(Argentina) Marcos Ligato
Leg 1 (8 May)	SS2	Complejo Pro-Racing (Lane B)	3.02 km	(Argentina) Marcos Ligato	Mitsubishi Lancer Evo VII	2:18.3	(Argentina) Marcos Ligato
Leg 1 (9 May)	SS3	El Reposo — Los Sauces 1	10.03 km	(Argentina) Marcos Ligato	Mitsubishi Lancer Evo VII	6:04.4	(Argentina) Marcos Ligato
Leg 1 (9 May)	SS4	Canada de Rio Pinto — Villa Albertina 1	10.91 km	(Argentina) Marcos Ligato	Mitsubishi Lancer Evo VII	8:14.8	(Argentina) Marcos Ligato
Leg 1 (9 May)	SS5	Villa Albertina — Ischilin 1	15.17 km	(United Kingdom) Niall McShea	Mitsubishi Lancer Evo VI	9:48.9	(Japan) Toshihiro Arai
Leg 1 (9 May)	SS6	Museo Fader — Ongamira 1	18.49 km	(Italy) Giovanni Manfrinato	Mitsubishi Lancer Evo VI	11:04.5	(Japan) Toshihiro Arai
Leg 1 (9 May)	SS7	La Falda — Villa Giardino 1	9.37 km	(United Kingdom) Niall McShea	Mitsubishi Lancer Evo VI	7:04.9	(Japan) Toshihiro Arai
Leg 1 (9 May)	SS8	La Cumbre — Agua de Oro 1	21.70 km	(Japan) Toshihiro Arai	Subaru Impreza WRX STI N10	19:47.1	(Japan) Toshihiro Arai
Leg 1 (9 May)	SS9	Ascochinga — La Cumbre 1	28.83 km	(United Kingdom) Niall McShea	Mitsubishi Lancer Evo VI	20:11.2	(Japan) Toshihiro Arai
Leg 1 (9 May)	SS10	El Reposo — Los Sauces 2	10.03 km	(United Kingdom) Niall McShea	Mitsubishi Lancer Evo VI	6:06.2	(Japan) Toshihiro Arai
Leg 1 (9 May)	SS11	Canada de Rio Pinto — Villa Albertina 2	10.91 km	(Malaysia) Karamjit Singh	Proton Pert	8:23.8	(Japan) Toshihiro Arai
Leg 1 (9 May)	SS12	Villa Albertina — Ischilin 2	15.17 km	(United Kingdom) Niall McShea	Mitsubishi Lancer Evo VI	9:49.7	(Japan) Toshihiro Arai
Leg 1 (9 May)	SS13	Museo Fader — Ongamira 2	18.49 km	(Japan) Toshihiro Arai	Subaru Impreza WRX STI N10	10:48.0	(Japan) Toshihiro Arai
Leg 2 (10 May)	SS14	Capilla del Monte — San Marcos Sierra 1	23.02 km	Stage cancelled			(Japan) Toshihiro Arai
Leg 2 (10 May)	SS15	San Marcos Sierra — Charbonier 1	9.61 km	Notional stage time			(Japan) Toshihiro Arai
Leg 2 (10 May)	SS16	San Marcos Sierra — Cuchi Corral 1	22.57 km	(United Kingdom) Niall McShea	Mitsubishi Lancer Evo VI	14:32.9	(Japan) Toshihiro Arai
Leg 2 (10 May)	SS17	Cosquin — Villa Allende	19.19 km	(Japan) Toshihiro Arai	Subaru Impreza WRX STI N10	14:24.0	(Japan) Toshihiro Arai
Leg 2 (10 May)	SS18	Carlos Paz — Cabalango	14.81 km	(United Kingdom) Niall McShea	Mitsubishi Lancer Evo VI	11:00.0	(Japan) Toshihiro Arai
Leg 2 (10 May)	SS19	Tanti — Cosquin	9.50 km	(Japan) Toshihiro Arai	Subaru Impreza WRX STI N10	6:21.0	(Japan) Toshihiro Arai
Leg 2 (10 May)	SS20	Capilla del Monte — San Marcos Sierra 2	23.02 km	(Japan) Toshihiro Arai	Subaru Impreza WRX STI N10	18:20.3	(Japan) Toshihiro Arai
Leg 3 (11 May)	SS21	Capilla del Monte — San Marcos Sierra 3	23.02 km	(Japan) Toshihiro Arai	Subaru Impreza WRX STI N10	18:08.9	(Japan) Toshihiro Arai
Leg 3 (11 May)	SS22	San Marcos Sierra — Cuchi Corral 2	22.57 km	(United Kingdom) Niall McShea	Mitsubishi Lancer Evo VI	14:21.4	(Japan) Toshihiro Arai
Leg 3 (11 May)	SS23	La Falda — Villa Giardino 2	9.37 km	(Spain) Daniel Solà	Mitsubishi Lancer Evo VII	7:02.9	(Japan) Toshihiro Arai
Leg 3 (11 May)	SS24	La Cumbre — Agua de Oro 2	21.70 km	(Spain) Daniel Solà	Mitsubishi Lancer Evo VII	19:42.1	(Japan) Toshihiro Arai
Leg 3 (11 May)	SS25	Ascochinga — La Cumbre 2	28.83 km	(Spain) Daniel Solà	Mitsubishi Lancer Evo VII	20:00.0	(Japan) Toshihiro Arai

==== Championship standings ====
Pos.	Drivers' championships		
Pos.	Move	Driver	Points
1	3	(Japan) Toshihiro Arai	20
2		(Malaysia) Karamjit Singh	17
3	2	(Sweden) Stig Blomqvist	11
4	1	(United Kingdom) Martin Rowe	11
5		(Argentina) Marcos Ligato	8
