= 2003 Tour de Corse =

12th round of the 2003 World Rally Championship

2003 Tour de Corse 47th Tour de Corse - Rallye de France
Round 12 of the 2003 World Rally Championship season
← Previous event	Next event →
- Host country: France
- Rally base: Ajaccio
- Dates run: October 17, 2003 – October 19, 2003
- Stages: 16 (397.40 km; 246.93 miles)
- Stage surface: Asphalt
- Overall distance: 971.75 km (603.82 miles)

Statistics
- Crews: 62 at start, 34 at finish

Overall results
- Overall winner: (Norway) Petter Solberg (United Kingdom) Phil Mills (Japan) 555 Subaru World Rally Team; Subaru Impreza S9 WRC '03

The 2003 Tour de Corse (formally the 47th Tour de Corse - Rallye de France) was the twelfth round of the 2003 World Rally Championship. The race was held over three days between 17 October and 19 October 2003, and was based in Ajaccio, France. Subaru's Petter Solberg won the race, his 4th win in the World Rally Championship.

== Background ==
=== Entry list ===
No.	Driver	Co-Driver	Entrant	Car	Tyre
World Rally Championship manufacturer entries
1	(Finland) Marcus Grönholm	(Finland) Timo Rautiainen	(France) Marlboro Peugeot Total	Peugeot 206 WRC	MI
2	(United Kingdom) Richard Burns	(United Kingdom) Robert Reid	(France) Marlboro Peugeot Total	Peugeot 206 WRC	MI
3	(France) Gilles Panizzi	(France) Hervé Panizzi	(France) Marlboro Peugeot Total	Peugeot 206 WRC	MI
4	(Estonia) Markko Märtin	(United Kingdom) Michael Park	(United Kingdom) Ford Motor Co. Ltd.	Ford Focus RS WRC '03	MI
5	(Belgium) François Duval	(Belgium) Stéphane Prévot	(United Kingdom) Ford Motor Co. Ltd.	Ford Focus RS WRC '03	MI
6	(Finland) Mikko Hirvonen	(Finland) Jarmo Lehtinen	(United Kingdom) Ford Motor Co. Ltd.	Ford Focus RS WRC '02	MI
7	(Norway) Petter Solberg	(United Kingdom) Phil Mills	(Japan) 555 Subaru World Rally Team	Subaru Impreza S9 WRC '03	P
8	(Finland) Tommi Mäkinen	(Finland) Kaj Lindström	(Japan) 555 Subaru World Rally Team	Subaru Impreza S9 WRC '03	P
14	(France) Didier Auriol	(France) Denis Giraudet	(Czech Republic) Škoda Motorsport	Škoda Fabia WRC	MI
15	(Finland) Toni Gardemeister	(Finland) Paavo Lukander	(Czech Republic) Škoda Motorsport	Škoda Fabia WRC	MI
17	(United Kingdom) Colin McRae	(United Kingdom) Derek Ringer	(France) Citroën Total WRT	Citroën Xsara WRC	MI
18	(France) Sébastien Loeb	(Monaco) Daniel Elena	(France) Citroën Total WRT	Citroën Xsara WRC	MI
19	(Spain) Carlos Sainz	(Spain) Marc Martí	(France) Citroën Total WRT	Citroën Xsara WRC	MI
20	(France) Philippe Bugalski	(France) Jean-Paul Chiaroni	(France) Citroën Total WRT	Citroën Xsara WRC	MI
World Rally Championship entries
21	(France) Alexandre Bengué	(France) Caroline Escudero-Bengué	(France) Alexandre Bengué	Peugeot 206 WRC	MI
22	(Germany) Antony Warmbold	(United Kingdom) Gemma Price	(Germany) AW Rally Team	Ford Focus RS WRC '02	MI
23	(France) Cédric Robert	(France) Gérald Bedon	Equipe de France FFSA	Peugeot 206 WRC	MI
32	(Austria) Manfred Stohl	(Austria) Ilka Minor	(Austria) Stohl Racing	Peugeot 206 WRC	P
34	(France) Benoît Rousselot	(France) Gilles Mondésir	(France) Benoît Rousselot	Subaru Impreza S9 WRC '03	—N/a
35	(United Kingdom) Alistair Ginley	(Republic of Ireland) Rory Kennedy	(United Kingdom) Alistair Ginley	Ford Focus RS WRC '01	—N/a
102	(France) Armando Pereira	(France) Mickaële Rouillon	(France) Armando Pereira	Subaru Impreza S7 WRC '01	MI
103	(France) Jean-Claude Torre	(France) Patrick de la Foata	(France) Jean-Claude Torre	Peugeot 206 WRC	MI
104	(France) Didier Cormoreche	(France) René Belleville	(France) Didier Cormoreche	Peugeot 206 WRC	MI
105	(France) José Micheli	(France) Marie-Josée Cardi	(France) José Micheli	Toyota Corolla WRC	MI
106	(France) Alain Vauthier	(Belgium) Erwin Mombaerts	(France) Alain Vauthier	Subaru Impreza S5 WRC '99	MI
PWRC entries
52	(Spain) Daniel Solà	(Spain) Álex Romaní	(Italy) Mauro Rally Tuning	Mitsubishi Lancer Evo VII	P
53	(Peru) Ramón Ferreyros	(Mexico) Javier Marín	(Italy) Mauro Rally Tuning	Mitsubishi Lancer Evo VII	—N/a
54	(Japan) Toshihiro Arai	(New Zealand) Tony Sircombe	(Japan) Subaru Production Rally Team	Subaru Impreza WRX STI N10	P
55	(United Kingdom) Martin Rowe	(United Kingdom) Trevor Agnew	(United Kingdom) David Sutton Cars Ltd	Subaru Impreza WRX STI N10	P
59	(Italy) Stefano Marrini	(Italy) Tiziana Sandroni	(Italy) Top Run SRL	Mitsubishi Lancer Evo VII	—N/a
60	(United Kingdom) Niall McShea	(United Kingdom) Chris Patterson	(New Zealand) Neil Allport Motorsports	Mitsubishi Lancer Evo VI	MI
61	(Poland) Janusz Kulig	(Poland) Maciej Szczepaniak	Mobil 1 Team Poland	Mitsubishi Lancer Evo VII	—N/a
64	(Sweden) Joakim Roman	(Sweden) Ragnar Spjuth	(Sweden) Milbrooks World Rally Team	Mitsubishi Lancer Evo V	—N/a
65	(Sweden) Stig Blomqvist	(Venezuela) Ana Goñi	(United Kingdom) David Sutton Cars Ltd	Subaru Impreza WRX STI N10	P
69	(Belgium) Bob Colsoul	(Belgium) Tom Colsoul	(Belgium) Guy Colsoul Rallysport	Mitsubishi Lancer Evo VII	MI
70	(Italy) Riccardo Errani	(Italy) Stefano Casadio	(Italy) Errani Team Group	Mitsubishi Lancer Evo VI	—N/a
74	(Italy) Fabio Frisiero	(Italy) Giovanni Agnese	(Italy) Motoring Club	Mitsubishi Lancer Evo VII	—N/a
76	(Canada) Patrick Richard	(Norway) Ola Fløene	Subaru Rally Team Canada	Subaru Impreza STI N9	P
77	(Italy) Alfredo De Dominicis	(Italy) Giovanni Bernacchini	Ralliart Italy	Mitsubishi Lancer Evo VII	—N/a
80	(Mexico) Ricardo Triviño	(Spain) Jordi Barrabés	(Mexico) Triviño Racing	Mitsubishi Lancer Evo VII	—N/a

=== Itinerary ===
All dates and times are CEST (UTC+2).

Date	Time	No.	Stage name	Distance
Leg 1 — 95.30 km
17 October	10:11	SS1	Cargese — Paomia 1	14.64 km
17 October	10:44	SS2	Vico — Pont du Liamone 1	15.49 km
17 October	11:17	SS3	Golfe de la Liscia — Sarrola Carcopino 1	17.52 km
17 October	14:23	SS4	Cargese — Paomia 2	14.64 km
17 October	14:56	SS5	Vico — Pont du Liamone 2	15.49 km
17 October	15:29	SS6	Golfe de la Liscia — Sarrola Carcopino 2	17.52 km
Leg 2 — 190.00 km
18 October	08:33	SS7	Ampaza — Petreto 1	38.64 km
18 October	09:36	SS8	Pont de la Masina — Col St. Georges 1	15.42 km
18 October	11:29	SS9	Col de Carazzi — Bastelica 1	40.94 km
18 October	14:07	SS10	Ampaza — Petreto 2	38.64 km
18 October	15:10	SS11	Pont de la Masina — Col St. Georges 2	15.42 km
18 October	17:03	SS12	Col de Carazzi — Bastelica 2	40.94 km
Leg 3 — 112.10 km
19 October	08:12	SS13	Penitencier Coti Chiavari — Pietra Rossa 1	24.24 km
19 October	08:55	SS14	Pont de Calzola — Agosta 1	31.81 km
19 October	11:47	SS15	Penitencier Coti Chiavari — Pietra Rossa 2	24.24 km
19 October	12:30	SS16	Pont de Calzola — Agosta 2	31.81 km

== Results ==
=== Overall ===
Pos.	No.	Driver	Co-driver	Team	Car	Time	Difference	Points
1	7	(Norway) Petter Solberg	(United Kingdom) Phil Mills	(Japan) 555 Subaru World Rally Team	Subaru Impreza S9 WRC '03	4:20:15.3		10
2	19	(Spain) Carlos Sainz	(Spain) Marc Martí	(France) Citroën Total WRT	Citroën Xsara WRC	4:20:51.9	+36.6	8
3	5	(Belgium) François Duval	(Belgium) Stéphane Prévot	(United Kingdom) Ford Motor Co. Ltd.	Ford Focus RS WRC '03	4:20:57.0	+41.7	6
4	1	(Finland) Marcus Grönholm	(Finland) Timo Rautiainen	(France) Marlboro Peugeot Total	Peugeot 206 WRC	4:21:24.5	+1:09.2	5
5	17	(United Kingdom) Colin McRae	(United Kingdom) Derek Ringer	(France) Citroën Total WRT	Citroën Xsara WRC	4:21:41.3	+1:26.0	4
6	3	(France) Gilles Panizzi	(France) Hervé Panizzi	(France) Marlboro Peugeot Total	Peugeot 206 WRC	4:22:14.0	+1:58.7	3
7	8	(Finland) Tommi Mäkinen	(Finland) Kaj Lindström	(Japan) 555 Subaru World Rally Team	Subaru Impreza S9 WRC '03	4:22:41.1	+2:25.8	2
8	2	(United Kingdom) Richard Burns	(United Kingdom) Robert Reid	(France) Marlboro Peugeot Total	Peugeot 206 WRC	4:22:52.0	+2:36.7	1

=== World Rally Cars ===
==== Classification ====
Position		No.	Driver	Co-driver	Entrant	Car	Time	Difference	Points
Event	Class	No.	Driver	Co-driver	Entrant	Car	Time	Difference	Points
1	1	7	(Norway) Petter Solberg	(United Kingdom) Phil Mills	(Japan) 555 Subaru World Rally Team	Subaru Impreza S9 WRC '03	4:20:15.3		10
2	2	19	(Spain) Carlos Sainz	(Spain) Marc Martí	(France) Citroën Total WRT	Citroën Xsara WRC	4:20:51.9	+36.6	8
3	3	5	(Belgium) François Duval	(Belgium) Stéphane Prévot	(United Kingdom) Ford Motor Co. Ltd.	Ford Focus RS WRC '03	4:20:57.0	+41.7	6
4	4	1	(Finland) Marcus Grönholm	(Finland) Timo Rautiainen	(France) Marlboro Peugeot Total	Peugeot 206 WRC	4:21:24.5	+1:09.2	5
5	5	17	(United Kingdom) Colin McRae	(United Kingdom) Derek Ringer	(France) Citroën Total WRT	Citroën Xsara WRC	4:21:41.3	+1:26.0	4
6	6	3	(France) Gilles Panizzi	(France) Hervé Panizzi	(France) Marlboro Peugeot Total	Peugeot 206 WRC	4:22:14.0	+1:58.7	3
7	7	8	(Finland) Tommi Mäkinen	(Finland) Kaj Lindström	(Japan) 555 Subaru World Rally Team	Subaru Impreza S9 WRC '03	4:22:41.1	+2:25.8	2
8	8	2	(United Kingdom) Richard Burns	(United Kingdom) Robert Reid	(France) Marlboro Peugeot Total	Peugeot 206 WRC	4:22:52.0	+2:36.7	1
9	9	20	(France) Philippe Bugalski	(France) Jean-Paul Chiaroni	(France) Citroën Total WRT	Citroën Xsara WRC	4:23:02.1	+2:46.8	0
10	10	6	(Finland) Mikko Hirvonen	(Finland) Jarmo Lehtinen	(United Kingdom) Ford Motor Co. Ltd.	Ford Focus RS WRC '02	4:24:10.7	+3:55.4	0
11	11	15	(Finland) Toni Gardemeister	(Finland) Paavo Lukander	(Czech Republic) Škoda Motorsport	Škoda Fabia WRC	4:25:25.2	+5:09.9	0
13	12	18	(France) Sébastien Loeb	(Monaco) Daniel Elena	(France) Citroën Total WRT	Citroën Xsara WRC	4:29:49.3	+9:34.0	0
Retired SS15		4	(Estonia) Markko Märtin	(United Kingdom) Michael Park	(United Kingdom) Ford Motor Co. Ltd.	Ford Focus RS WRC '03	Accident		0
Retired SS1		14	(France) Didier Auriol	(France) Denis Giraudet	(Czech Republic) Škoda Motorsport	Škoda Fabia WRC	Electrical		0

==== Special stages ====
Day	Stage	Stage name	Length	Winner	Car	Time	Class leaders
Leg 1 (17 Oct)	SS1	Cargese — Paomia 1	14.64 km	(Spain) Carlos Sainz	Citroën Xsara WRC	9:49.6	(Spain) Carlos Sainz
Leg 1 (17 Oct)	SS2	Vico — Pont du Liamone 1	15.49 km	(France) Sébastien Loeb	Citroën Xsara WRC	10:04.6	(Estonia) Markko Märtin
Leg 1 (17 Oct)	SS3	Golfe de la Liscia — Sarrola Carcopino 1	17.52 km	(Estonia) Markko Märtin	Ford Focus RS WRC '03	10:43.6	(Estonia) Markko Märtin
Leg 1 (17 Oct)	SS4	Cargese — Paomia 2	14.64 km	(Belgium) François Duval	Ford Focus RS WRC '03	9:45.3	(France) Sébastien Loeb
Leg 1 (17 Oct)	SS5	Vico — Pont du Liamone 2	15.49 km	(Estonia) Markko Märtin	Ford Focus RS WRC '03	10:03.6	(France) Sébastien Loeb
Leg 1 (17 Oct)	SS6	Golfe de la Liscia — Sarrola Carcopino 2	17.52 km	(Estonia) Markko Märtin	Ford Focus RS WRC '03	10:43.2	(France) Sébastien Loeb
Leg 2 (18 Oct)	SS7	Ampaza — Petreto 1	38.64 km	(Estonia) Markko Märtin	Ford Focus RS WRC '03	25:32.2	(France) Sébastien Loeb
Leg 2 (18 Oct)	SS8	Pont de la Masina — Col St. Georges 1	15.42 km	(Finland) Mikko Hirvonen	Ford Focus RS WRC '02	10:31.5	(Belgium) François Duval
Leg 2 (18 Oct)	SS9	Col de Carazzi — Bastelica 1	40.94 km	(France) Gilles Panizzi	Peugeot 206 WRC	27:23.5	(Belgium) François Duval
Leg 2 (18 Oct)	SS10	Ampaza — Petreto 2	38.64 km	(Norway) Petter Solberg	Subaru Impreza S9 WRC '03	25:20.7	(Belgium) François Duval
Leg 2 (18 Oct)	SS11	Pont de la Masina — Col St. Georges 2	15.42 km	(Norway) Petter Solberg	Subaru Impreza S9 WRC '03	10:22.3	(Belgium) François Duval
Leg 2 (18 Oct)	SS12	Col de Carazzi — Bastelica 2	40.94 km	(Norway) Petter Solberg	Subaru Impreza S9 WRC '03	27:15.6	(Norway) Petter Solberg
Leg 3 (19 Oct)	SS13	Penitencier Coti Chiavari — Pietra Rossa 1	24.24 km	(France) Sébastien Loeb	Citroën Xsara WRC	15:19.0	(Norway) Petter Solberg
Leg 3 (19 Oct)	SS14	Pont de Calzola — Agosta 1	31.81 km	(France) Sébastien Loeb	Citroën Xsara WRC	19:47.2	(Norway) Petter Solberg
Leg 3 (19 Oct)	SS15	Penitencier Coti Chiavari — Pietra Rossa 2	24.24 km	(France) Sébastien Loeb	Citroën Xsara WRC	15:25.4	(Norway) Petter Solberg
Leg 3 (19 Oct)	SS16	Pont de Calzola — Agosta 2	31.81 km	(France) Sébastien Loeb	Citroën Xsara WRC	19:56.4	(Norway) Petter Solberg

==== Championship standings ====
Pos.	Drivers' championships			Co-drivers' championships			Manufacturers' championships		
Pos.	Move	Driver	Points	Move	Co-driver	Points	Move	Manufacturer	Points
1	2	(Spain) Carlos Sainz	61	2	(Spain) Marc Martí	61		(France) Citroën Total WRT	137
2	2	(Norway) Petter Solberg	58	2	(United Kingdom) Phil Mills	58		(France) Marlboro Peugeot Total	129
3	2	(United Kingdom) Richard Burns	58	2	(United Kingdom) Robert Reid	58		(Japan) 555 Subaru World Rally Team	88
4	2	(France) Sébastien Loeb	55	2	(Monaco) Daniel Elena	55		(United Kingdom) Ford Motor Co. Ltd.	78
5	1	(Finland) Marcus Grönholm	43	1	(Finland) Timo Rautiainen	43		(Czech Republic) Škoda Motorsport	21

=== Production World Rally Championship ===
==== Classification ====
Position		No.	Driver	Co-driver	Entrant	Car	Time	Difference	Points
Event	Class	No.	Driver	Co-driver	Entrant	Car	Time	Difference	Points
16	1	60	(United Kingdom) Niall McShea	(United Kingdom) Chris Patterson	(New Zealand) Neil Allport Motorsports	Mitsubishi Lancer Evo VI	4:49:47.8		10
17	2	54	(Japan) Toshihiro Arai	(New Zealand) Tony Sircombe	(Japan) Subaru Production Rally Team	Subaru Impreza WRX STI N10	4:50:45.4	+57.6	8
18	3	55	(United Kingdom) Martin Rowe	(United Kingdom) Trevor Agnew	(United Kingdom) David Sutton Cars Ltd	Subaru Impreza WRX STI N10	4:54:51.8	+5:04.0	6
19	4	61	(Poland) Janusz Kulig	(Poland) Maciej Szczepaniak	Mobil 1 Team Poland	Mitsubishi Lancer Evo VII	4:55:46.2	+5:58.4	5
20	5	65	(Sweden) Stig Blomqvist	(Venezuela) Ana Goñi	(United Kingdom) David Sutton Cars Ltd	Subaru Impreza WRX STI N10	4:55:51.4	+6:03.6	4
23	6	69	(Belgium) Bob Colsoul	(Belgium) Tom Colsoul	(Belgium) Guy Colsoul Rallysport	Mitsubishi Lancer Evo VII	4:57:57.3	+8:09.5	3
25	7	80	(Mexico) Ricardo Triviño	(Spain) Jordi Barrabés	(Mexico) Triviño Racing	Mitsubishi Lancer Evo VII	5:07:13.9	+17:26.1	2
29	8	70	(Italy) Riccardo Errani	(Italy) Stefano Casadio	(Italy) Errani Team Group	Mitsubishi Lancer Evo VI	5:28:17.8	+38:30.0	1
32	9	64	(Sweden) Joakim Roman	(Sweden) Ragnar Spjuth	(Sweden) Milbrooks World Rally Team	Mitsubishi Lancer Evo V	5:41:35.0	+51:47.2	0
33	10	59	(Italy) Stefano Marrini	(Italy) Tiziana Sandroni	(Italy) Top Run SRL	Mitsubishi Lancer Evo VII	5:41:50.3	+52:02.5	0
Retired SS15		52	(Spain) Daniel Solà	(Spain) Álex Romaní	(Italy) Mauro Rally Tuning	Mitsubishi Lancer Evo VII	Mechanical		0
Retired SS10		74	(Italy) Fabio Frisiero	(Italy) Giovanni Agnese	(Italy) Motoring Club	Mitsubishi Lancer Evo VII	Accident		0
Retired SS9		76	(Canada) Patrick Richard	(Norway) Ola Fløene	Subaru Rally Team Canada	Subaru Impreza STI N9	Mechanical		0
Retired SS4		77	(Italy) Alfredo De Dominicis	(Italy) Giovanni Bernacchini	Ralliart Italy	Mitsubishi Lancer Evo VII	Mechanical		0
Retired SS1		53	(Peru) Ramón Ferreyros	(Mexico) Javier Marín	(Italy) Mauro Rally Tuning	Mitsubishi Lancer Evo VII	Mechanical		0

==== Special stages ====
Day	Stage	Stage name	Length	Winner	Car	Time	Class leaders
Leg 1 (17 Oct)	SS1	Cargese — Paomia 1	14.64 km	(Spain) Daniel Solà	Mitsubishi Lancer Evo VII	10:35.8	(Spain) Daniel Solà
Leg 1 (17 Oct)	SS2	Vico — Pont du Liamone 1	15.49 km	(Spain) Daniel Solà	Mitsubishi Lancer Evo VII	10:58.3	(Spain) Daniel Solà
Leg 1 (17 Oct)	SS3	Golfe de la Liscia — Sarrola Carcopino 1	17.52 km	(Spain) Daniel Solà	Mitsubishi Lancer Evo VII	11:53.8	(Spain) Daniel Solà
Leg 1 (17 Oct)	SS4	Cargese — Paomia 2	14.64 km	(Spain) Daniel Solà	Mitsubishi Lancer Evo VII	10:34.6	(Spain) Daniel Solà
Leg 1 (17 Oct)	SS5	Vico — Pont du Liamone 2	15.49 km	(Spain) Daniel Solà	Mitsubishi Lancer Evo VII	10:54.0	(Spain) Daniel Solà
Leg 1 (17 Oct)	SS6	Golfe de la Liscia — Sarrola Carcopino 2	17.52 km	(Spain) Daniel Solà	Mitsubishi Lancer Evo VII	11:51.1	(Spain) Daniel Solà
Leg 2 (18 Oct)	SS7	Ampaza — Petreto 1	38.64 km	(Spain) Daniel Solà	Mitsubishi Lancer Evo VII	28:02.5	(Spain) Daniel Solà
Leg 2 (18 Oct)	SS8	Pont de la Masina — Col St. Georges 1	15.42 km	(Spain) Daniel Solà	Mitsubishi Lancer Evo VII	11:52.1	(Spain) Daniel Solà
Leg 2 (18 Oct)	SS9	Col de Carazzi — Bastelica 1	40.94 km	(Spain) Daniel Solà	Mitsubishi Lancer Evo VII	30:01.1	(Spain) Daniel Solà
Leg 2 (18 Oct)	SS10	Ampaza — Petreto 2	38.64 km	(Spain) Daniel Solà	Mitsubishi Lancer Evo VII	27:44.8	(Spain) Daniel Solà
Leg 2 (18 Oct)	SS11	Pont de la Masina — Col St. Georges 2	15.42 km	(United Kingdom) Niall McShea	Mitsubishi Lancer Evo VI	11:36.6	(Spain) Daniel Solà
Leg 2 (18 Oct)	SS12	Col de Carazzi — Bastelica 2	40.94 km	(Spain) Daniel Solà	Mitsubishi Lancer Evo VII	30:08.4	(Spain) Daniel Solà
Leg 3 (19 Oct)	SS13	Penitencier Coti Chiavari — Pietra Rossa 1	24.24 km	(Japan) Toshihiro Arai	Subaru Impreza WRX STI N10	17:04.6	(United Kingdom) Niall McShea
Leg 3 (19 Oct)	SS14	Pont de Calzola — Agosta 1	31.81 km	(Japan) Toshihiro Arai	Subaru Impreza WRX STI N10	22:01.8	(United Kingdom) Niall McShea
Leg 3 (19 Oct)	SS15	Penitencier Coti Chiavari — Pietra Rossa 2	24.24 km	(Poland) Janusz Kulig	Mitsubishi Lancer Evo VII	17:11.8	(United Kingdom) Niall McShea
Leg 3 (19 Oct)	SS16	Pont de Calzola — Agosta 2	31.81 km	(Poland) Janusz Kulig	Mitsubishi Lancer Evo VII	22:13.6	(United Kingdom) Niall McShea

==== Championship standings ====
- **Bold text** indicates 2003 World Champions.

Pos.	Drivers' championships		
Pos.	Move	Driver	Points
1		(United Kingdom) **Martin Rowe**	43
2		(Japan) Toshihiro Arai	38
3	1	(Sweden) Stig Blomqvist	30
4	1	(Malaysia) Karamjit Singh	30
5		(Spain) Daniel Solà	22
