= 2003 Rally New Zealand =

4th round of the 2003 World Rally Championship

2003 Rally New Zealand 34th Propecia Rally New Zealand
Round 4 of the 2003 World Rally Championship season
| ← Previous event | Next event → |
- Host country: New Zealand
- Rally base: Auckland
- Dates run: April 10, 2003 – April 13, 2003
- Stages: 22 (403.34 km; 250.62 miles)
- Stage surface: Gravel
- Overall distance: 1,297.62 km (806.30 miles)

Statistics
- Crews: 80 at start, 46 at finish

Overall results
- Overall winner: (Finland) Marcus Grönholm (Finland) Timo Rautiainen (France) Marlboro Peugeot Total; Peugeot 206 WRC

The 2003 Rally New Zealand (formally the 34th Propecia Rally New Zealand) was the fourth round of the 2003 World Rally Championship. The race was held over four days between 10 April and 13 April 2003, and was based in Auckland, New Zealand. Peugeot's Marcus Grönholm won the race, his 14th win in the World Rally Championship.

== Background ==
=== Entry list ===
| No. | Driver | Co-Driver | Entrant | Car | Tyre |
|---|---|---|---|---|---|
World Rally Championship manufacturer entries
| 1 | (Finland) Marcus Grönholm | (Finland) Timo Rautiainen | (France) Marlboro Peugeot Total | Peugeot 206 WRC | MI |
| 2 | (United Kingdom) Richard Burns | (United Kingdom) Robert Reid | (France) Marlboro Peugeot Total | Peugeot 206 WRC | MI |
| 3 | (Finland) Harri Rovanperä | (Finland) Risto Pietiläinen | (France) Marlboro Peugeot Total | Peugeot 206 WRC | MI |
| 4 | (Estonia) Markko Märtin | (United Kingdom) Michael Park | (United Kingdom) Ford Motor Co. Ltd. | Ford Focus RS WRC '03 | MI |
| 5 | (Belgium) François Duval | (Belgium) Stéphane Prévot | (United Kingdom) Ford Motor Co. Ltd. | Ford Focus RS WRC '03 | MI |
| 6 | (Finland) Mikko Hirvonen | (Finland) Jarmo Lehtinen | (United Kingdom) Ford Motor Co. Ltd. | Ford Focus RS WRC '02 | MI |
| 7 | (Norway) Petter Solberg | (United Kingdom) Phil Mills | (Japan) 555 Subaru World Rally Team | Subaru Impreza S9 WRC '03 | P |
| 8 | (Finland) Tommi Mäkinen | (Finland) Kaj Lindström | (Japan) 555 Subaru World Rally Team | Subaru Impreza S9 WRC '03 | P |
| 10 | (Germany) Armin Schwarz | (Germany) Manfred Hiemer | (South Korea) Hyundai World Rally Team | Hyundai Accent WRC3 | MI |
| 11 | (Belgium) Freddy Loix | (Belgium) Sven Smeets | (South Korea) Hyundai World Rally Team | Hyundai Accent WRC3 | MI |
| 12 | (Finland) Jussi Välimäki | (Finland) Tero Gardemeister | (South Korea) Hyundai World Rally Team | Hyundai Accent WRC3 | MI |
| 14 | (France) Didier Auriol | (France) Denis Giraudet | (Czech Republic) Škoda Motorsport | Škoda Octavia WRC Evo3 | MI |
| 15 | (Finland) Toni Gardemeister | (Finland) Paavo Lukander | (Czech Republic) Škoda Motorsport | Škoda Octavia WRC Evo3 | MI |
| 17 | (United Kingdom) Colin McRae | (United Kingdom) Derek Ringer | (France) Citroën Total WRT | Citroën Xsara WRC | MI |
| 18 | (France) Sébastien Loeb | (Monaco) Daniel Elena | (France) Citroën Total WRT | Citroën Xsara WRC | MI |
| 19 | (Spain) Carlos Sainz | (Spain) Marc Martí | (France) Citroën Total WRT | Citroën Xsara WRC | MI |
World Rally Championship entries
| 20 | (Germany) Antony Warmbold | (United Kingdom) Gemma Price | (Germany) AW Rally Team | Ford Focus RS WRC '02 | —N/a |
| 32 | (United Kingdom) Alister McRae | (United Kingdom) David Senior | (Japan) Mitsubishi Ralliart Europe | Mitsubishi Lancer WRC2 | —N/a |
| 33 | (Finland) Kristian Sohlberg | (Finland) Jakke Honkanen | (Finland) Blue Rose Team | Mitsubishi Lancer WRC2 | —N/a |
| 34 | (Poland) Tomasz Kuchar | (Poland) Maciek Szczepaniak | (Poland) Tomasz Kuchar | Ford Focus RS WRC '02 | MI |
| 35 | (Austria) Manfred Stohl | (Austria) Ilka Minor | (Austria) Stohl Racing | Peugeot 206 WRC | P |
PWRC entries
| 51 | (Malaysia) Karamjit Singh | (Malaysia) Allen Oh | (Malaysia) Petronas EON Racing Team | Proton Pert | —N/a |
| 52 | (Spain) Daniel Solà | (Spain) Álex Romaní | (Italy) Mauro Rally Tuning | Mitsubishi Lancer Evo VII | —N/a |
| 53 | (Peru) Ramón Ferreyros | (Mexico) Javier Marín | (Italy) Mauro Rally Tuning | Mitsubishi Lancer Evo VII | —N/a |
| 54 | (Japan) Toshihiro Arai | (New Zealand) Tony Sircombe | (Japan) Subaru Production Rally Team | Subaru Impreza WRX STI N10 | —N/a |
| 55 | (United Kingdom) Martin Rowe | (United Kingdom) Trevor Agnew | (United Kingdom) David Sutton Cars Ltd | Subaru Impreza WRX STI N8 | —N/a |
| 57 | (Italy) Giovanni Manfrinato | (Italy) Claudio Condotta | (Italy) Top Run SRL | Mitsubishi Lancer Evo VI | —N/a |
| 58 | (Argentina) Marcos Ligato | (Argentina) Rubén García | (Italy) Top Run SRL | Mitsubishi Lancer Evo VII | —N/a |
| 60 | (United Kingdom) Niall McShea | (United Kingdom) Chris Patterson | (New Zealand) Neil Allport Motorsports | Mitsubishi Lancer Evo VI | —N/a |
| 61 | (Poland) Janusz Kulig | (Poland) Jarosław Baran | (Italy) Top Run SRL | Mitsubishi Lancer Evo VII | MI |
| 62 | (New Zealand) Peter 'Possum' Bourne | (Australia) Mark Stacey | (Japan) Subaru Production Rally Team | Subaru Impreza WRX STI | —N/a |
| 64 | (Sweden) Joakim Roman | (Sweden) Ingrid Mitakidou | (Sweden) Milbrooks World Rally Team | Mitsubishi Lancer Evo V | —N/a |
| 65 | (Sweden) Stig Blomqvist | (Venezuela) Ana Goñi | (United Kingdom) David Sutton Cars Ltd | Subaru Impreza WRX STI N8 | —N/a |
| 66 | (Oman) Hamed Al-Wahaibi | (United Kingdom) Nicky Beech | (Austria) Stohl Racing | Mitsubishi Lancer Evo VII | —N/a |
| 67 | (Poland) Krzysztof Hołowczyc | (Poland) Łukasz Kurzeja | (Poland) Orlen Team | Mitsubishi Lancer Evo VI | MI |
| 70 | (Italy) Riccardo Errani | (Italy) Stefano Casadio | (Italy) Errani Team Group | Mitsubishi Lancer Evo VI | —N/a |
| 71 | (Bulgaria) Georgi Geradzhiev Jr. | (Bulgaria) Nikola Popov | (Bulgaria) Racing Team Bulgartabac | Mitsubishi Lancer Evo VI | —N/a |
| 72 | (Romania) Constantin Aur | (Romania) Adrian Berghea | (Austria) Stohl Racing | Mitsubishi Lancer Evo VII | —N/a |
| 74 | (Italy) Fabio Frisiero | (Italy) Loris Roggia | (Italy) Motoring Club | Mitsubishi Lancer Evo VII | —N/a |
| 76 | (Canada) Patrick Richard | (Sweden) Mikael Johansson | Subaru Rally Team Canada | Subaru Impreza WRX | —N/a |
| 77 | (Italy) Alfredo De Dominicis | (Italy) Giovanni Bernacchini | Ralliart Italy | Mitsubishi Lancer Evo VI | —N/a |
| 78 | (Poland) Łukasz Sztuka | (Poland) Zbigniew Cieślar | (Belgium) First Motorsport | Mitsubishi Lancer Evo V | —N/a |
| 80 | (Mexico) Ricardo Triviño | (Spain) Jordi Barrabés | (Mexico) Triviño Racing | Mitsubishi Lancer Evo VII | —N/a |

=== Itinerary ===
All dates and times are NZST (UTC+12).

| Date | Time | No. | Stage name | Distance |
|---|---|---|---|---|
Leg 1 — 139.10 km
| 11 April | 09:43 | SS1 | Batley 1 | 19.82 km |
| 11 April | 10:11 | SS2 | Waipu Gorge 1 | 11.24 km |
| 11 April | 10:34 | SS3 | Brooks 1 | 16.03 km |
| 11 April | 11:47 | SS4 | New Cassidy | 21.64 km |
| 11 April | 13:00 | SS5 | Paparoa Station 1 | 11.64 km |
| 11 April | 14:36 | SS6 | Batley 2 | 19.82 km |
| 11 April | 15:04 | SS7 | Waipu Gorge 2 | 11.24 km |
| 11 April | 15:27 | SS8 | Brooks 2 | 16.03 km |
| 11 April | 15:55 | SS9 | Paparoa Station 2 | 11.64 km |
Leg 2 — 150.43 km
| 12 April | 08:43 | SS10 | Parahi — Ararua | 59.00 km |
| 12 April | 11:31 | SS11 | Mititat Finish | 20.15 km |
| 12 April | 12:09 | SS12 | Takatoka | 10.15 km |
| 12 April | 13:32 | SS13 | Parahi | 25.18 km |
| 12 April | 14:05 | SS14 | Ararua | 31.75 km |
| 12 April | 19:00 | SS15 | Manukau Super 1 | 2.10 km |
| 12 April | 19:30 | SS16 | Manukau Super 2 | 2.10 km |
Leg 3 — 113.81 km
| 13 April | 08:23 | SS17 | Te Akau South Revers | 27.34 km |
| 13 April | 09:06 | SS18 | Te Akau North | 32.37 km |
| 13 April | 11:19 | SS19 | Ridge — Campbell 1 | 16.45 km |
| 13 April | 11:47 | SS20 | Ridge — Campbell 2 | 16.45 km |
| 13 April | 12:40 | SS21 | Fyfe 1 | 10.60 km |
| 13 April | 13:10 | SS22 | Fyfe 2 | 10.60 km |

== Results ==
=== Overall ===
| Pos. | No. | Driver | Co-driver | Team | Car | Time | Difference | Points |
|---|---|---|---|---|---|---|---|---|
| 1 | 1 | (Finland) Marcus Grönholm | (Finland) Timo Rautiainen | (France) Marlboro Peugeot Total | Peugeot 206 WRC | 3:45:21.2 | | 10 |
| 2 | 2 | (United Kingdom) Richard Burns | (United Kingdom) Robert Reid | (France) Marlboro Peugeot Total | Peugeot 206 WRC | 3:46:29.9 | +1:08.7 | 8 |
| 3 | 7 | (Norway) Petter Solberg | (United Kingdom) Phil Mills | (Japan) 555 Subaru World Rally Team | Subaru Impreza S9 WRC '03 | 3:47:31.0 | +2:09.8 | 6 |
| 4 | 18 | (France) Sébastien Loeb | (Monaco) Daniel Elena | (France) Citroën Total WRT | Citroën Xsara WRC | 3:49:36.6 | +4:15.4 | 5 |
| 5 | 15 | (Finland) Toni Gardemeister | (Finland) Paavo Lukander | (Czech Republic) Škoda Motorsport | Škoda Octavia WRC Evo3 | 3:53:35.0 | +8:13.8 | 4 |
| 6 | 32 | (United Kingdom) Alister McRae | (United Kingdom) David Senior | (Japan) Mitsubishi Ralliart Europe | Mitsubishi Lancer WRC2 | 3:54:35.4 | +9:14.2 | 3 |
| 7 | 8 | (Finland) Tommi Mäkinen | (Finland) Kaj Lindström | (Japan) 555 Subaru World Rally Team | Subaru Impreza S9 WRC '03 | 3:55:11.4 | +9:50.2 | 2 |
| 8 | 14 | (France) Didier Auriol | (France) Denis Giraudet | (Czech Republic) Škoda Motorsport | Škoda Octavia WRC Evo3 | 3:55:29.8 | +10:08.6 | 1 |

=== World Rally Cars ===
==== Classification ====
| Position | | No. | Driver | Co-driver | Entrant | Car | Time | Difference | Points |
| Event | Class | No. | Driver | Co-driver | Entrant | Car | Time | Difference | Points |
|---|---|---|---|---|---|---|---|---|---|
| 1 | 1 | 1 | (Finland) Marcus Grönholm | (Finland) Timo Rautiainen | (France) Marlboro Peugeot Total | Peugeot 206 WRC | 3:45:21.2 | | 10 |
| 2 | 2 | 2 | (United Kingdom) Richard Burns | (United Kingdom) Robert Reid | (France) Marlboro Peugeot Total | Peugeot 206 WRC | 3:46:29.9 | +1:08.7 | 8 |
| 3 | 3 | 7 | (Norway) Petter Solberg | (United Kingdom) Phil Mills | (Japan) 555 Subaru World Rally Team | Subaru Impreza S9 WRC '03 | 3:47:31.0 | +2:09.8 | 6 |
| 4 | 4 | 18 | (France) Sébastien Loeb | (Monaco) Daniel Elena | (France) Citroën Total WRT | Citroën Xsara WRC | 3:49:36.6 | +4:15.4 | 5 |
| 5 | 5 | 15 | (Finland) Toni Gardemeister | (Finland) Paavo Lukander | (Czech Republic) Škoda Motorsport | Škoda Octavia WRC Evo3 | 3:53:35.0 | +8:13.8 | 4 |
| 7 | 6 | 8 | (Finland) Tommi Mäkinen | (Finland) Kaj Lindström | (Japan) 555 Subaru World Rally Team | Subaru Impreza S9 WRC '03 | 3:55:11.4 | +9:50.2 | 2 |
| 8 | 7 | 14 | (France) Didier Auriol | (France) Denis Giraudet | (Czech Republic) Škoda Motorsport | Škoda Octavia WRC Evo3 | 3:55:29.8 | +10:08.6 | 1 |
| 9 | 8 | 5 | (Belgium) François Duval | (Belgium) Stéphane Prévot | (United Kingdom) Ford Motor Co. Ltd. | Ford Focus RS WRC '03 | 3:56:32.9 | +11:11.7 | 0 |
| 10 | 9 | 6 | (Finland) Mikko Hirvonen | (Finland) Jarmo Lehtinen | (United Kingdom) Ford Motor Co. Ltd. | Ford Focus RS WRC '02 | 3:59:03.5 | +13:42.3 | 0 |
| 12 | 10 | 19 | (Spain) Carlos Sainz | (Spain) Marc Martí | (France) Citroën Total WRT | Citroën Xsara WRC | 4:03:34.4 | +18:13.2 | 0 |
| Retired SS18 | | 11 | (Belgium) Freddy Loix | (Belgium) Sven Smeets | (South Korea) Hyundai World Rally Team | Hyundai Accent WRC3 | Accident | | 0 |
| Retired SS14 | | 3 | (Finland) Harri Rovanperä | (Finland) Risto Pietiläinen | (France) Marlboro Peugeot Total | Peugeot 206 WRC | Accident | | 0 |
| Retired SS14 | | 4 | (Estonia) Markko Märtin | (United Kingdom) Michael Park | (United Kingdom) Ford Motor Co. Ltd. | Ford Focus RS WRC '03 | Engine | | 0 |
| Retired SS7 | | 12 | (Finland) Jussi Välimäki | (Finland) Tero Gardemeister | (South Korea) Hyundai World Rally Team | Hyundai Accent WRC3 | Accident | | 0 |
| Retired SS7 | | 17 | (United Kingdom) Colin McRae | (United Kingdom) Derek Ringer | (France) Citroën Total WRT | Citroën Xsara WRC | Accident damage | | 0 |
| Retired SS1 | | 10 | (Germany) Armin Schwarz | (Germany) Manfred Hiemer | (South Korea) Hyundai World Rally Team | Hyundai Accent WRC3 | Accident | | 0 |

==== Special stages ====
| Day | Stage | Stage name | Length | Winner | Car | Time | Class leaders |
|---|---|---|---|---|---|---|---|
| Leg 1 (11 Apr) | SS1 | Batley 1 | 19.82 km | (Finland) Marcus Grönholm | Peugeot 206 WRC | 10:45.2 | (Finland) Marcus Grönholm |
| Leg 1 (11 Apr) | SS2 | Waipu Gorge 1 | 11.24 km | (United Kingdom) Richard Burns | Peugeot 206 WRC | 6:37.0 | (Finland) Marcus Grönholm |
| Leg 1 (11 Apr) | SS3 | Brooks 1 | 16.03 km | (Finland) Marcus Grönholm | Peugeot 206 WRC | 9:46.3 | (Finland) Marcus Grönholm |
| Leg 1 (11 Apr) | SS4 | New Cassidy | 21.64 km | (Finland) Marcus Grönholm | Peugeot 206 WRC | 12:13.7 | (Finland) Marcus Grönholm |
| Leg 1 (11 Apr) | SS5 | Paparoa Station 1 | 11.64 km | (Finland) Marcus Grönholm | Peugeot 206 WRC | 6:18.2 | (Finland) Marcus Grönholm |
| Leg 1 (11 Apr) | SS6 | Batley 2 | 19.82 km | (Finland) Marcus Grönholm | Peugeot 206 WRC | 10:33.0 | (Finland) Marcus Grönholm |
| Leg 1 (11 Apr) | SS7 | Waipu Gorge 2 | 11.24 km | (United Kingdom) Richard Burns | Peugeot 206 WRC | 6:34.9 | (Finland) Marcus Grönholm |
| Leg 1 (11 Apr) | SS8 | Brooks 2 | 16.03 km | (Finland) Marcus Grönholm | Peugeot 206 WRC | 9:22.9 | (Finland) Marcus Grönholm |
| Leg 1 (11 Apr) | SS9 | Paparoa Station 2 | 11.64 km | (Finland) Marcus Grönholm | Peugeot 206 WRC | 6:11.7 | (Finland) Marcus Grönholm |
| Leg 2 (12 Apr) | SS10 | Parahi — Ararua | 59.00 km | (Finland) Marcus Grönholm | Peugeot 206 WRC | 33:20.5 | (Finland) Marcus Grönholm |
| Leg 2 (12 Apr) | SS11 | Mititat Finish | 20.15 km | (Estonia) Markko Märtin | Ford Focus RS WRC '03 | 10:03.0 | (Finland) Marcus Grönholm |
| Leg 2 (12 Apr) | SS12 | Takatoka | 10.15 km | (Estonia) Markko Märtin | Ford Focus RS WRC '03 | 5:07.1 | (Finland) Marcus Grönholm |
| Leg 2 (12 Apr) | SS13 | Parahi | 25.18 km | (Estonia) Markko Märtin | Ford Focus RS WRC '03 | 12:42.6 | (Finland) Marcus Grönholm |
| Leg 2 (12 Apr) | SS14 | Ararua | 31.75 km | (Finland) Marcus Grönholm | Peugeot 206 WRC | 19:01.3 | (Finland) Marcus Grönholm |
| Leg 2 (12 Apr) | SS15 | Manukau Super 1 | 2.10 km | (Belgium) François Duval | Ford Focus RS WRC '03 | 1:36.4 | (Finland) Marcus Grönholm |
| Leg 2 (12 Apr) | SS16 | Manukau Super 2 | 2.10 km | (Norway) Petter Solberg | Subaru Impreza S9 WRC '03 | 1:40.2 | (Finland) Marcus Grönholm |
| Leg 3 (13 Apr) | SS17 | Te Akau South Revers | 27.34 km | (Finland) Marcus Grönholm | Peugeot 206 WRC | 15:49.7 | (Finland) Marcus Grönholm |
| Leg 3 (13 Apr) | SS18 | Te Akau North | 32.37 km | (United Kingdom) Richard Burns | Peugeot 206 WRC | 17:43.0 | (Finland) Marcus Grönholm |
| Leg 3 (13 Apr) | SS19 | Ridge — Campbell 1 | 16.45 km | (United Kingdom) Richard Burns | Peugeot 206 WRC | 8:53.7 | (Finland) Marcus Grönholm |
| Leg 3 (13 Apr) | SS20 | Ridge — Campbell 2 | 16.45 km | (United Kingdom) Richard Burns | Peugeot 206 WRC | 8:46.9 | (Finland) Marcus Grönholm |
| Leg 3 (13 Apr) | SS21 | Fyfe 1 | 10.60 km | (United Kingdom) Richard Burns | Peugeot 206 WRC | 5:42.3 | (Finland) Marcus Grönholm |
| Leg 3 (13 Apr) | SS22 | Fyfe 2 | 10.60 km | (United Kingdom) Richard Burns | Peugeot 206 WRC | 5:36.9 | (Finland) Marcus Grönholm |

==== Championship standings ====
| Pos. | Drivers' championships | | | Co-drivers' championships | | | Manufacturers' championships | | |
| Pos. | Move | Driver | Points | Move | Co-driver | Points | Move | Manufacturer | Points |
|---|---|---|---|---|---|---|---|---|---|
| 1 | | (United Kingdom) Richard Burns | 26 | | (United Kingdom) Robert Reid | 26 | 1 | (France) Marlboro Peugeot Total | 49 |
| 2 | 4 | (Finland) Marcus Grönholm | 20 | 4 | (Finland) Timo Rautiainen | 20 | 1 | (France) Citroën Total WRT | 44 |
| 3 | 2 | (France) Sébastien Loeb | 17 | 2 | (Monaco) Daniel Elena | 17 | | (United Kingdom) Ford Motor Co. Ltd. | 26 |
| 4 | 2 | (United Kingdom) Colin McRae | 17 | 2 | (United Kingdom) Derek Ringer | 17 | | (Japan) 555 Subaru World Rally Team | 22 |
| 5 | 2 | (Spain) Carlos Sainz | 16 | 2 | (Spain) Marc Martí | 16 | | (Czech Republic) Škoda Motorsport | 12 |

=== Production World Rally Championship ===
==== Classification ====
| Position | | No. | Driver | Co-driver | Entrant | Car | Time | Difference | Points |
| Event | Class | No. | Driver | Co-driver | Entrant | Car | Time | Difference | Points |
|---|---|---|---|---|---|---|---|---|---|
| 11 | 1 | 54 | (Japan) Toshihiro Arai | (New Zealand) Tony Sircombe | (Japan) Subaru Production Rally Team | Subaru Impreza WRX STI N10 | 4:03:30.3 | | 10 |
| 16 | 2 | 58 | (Argentina) Marcos Ligato | (Argentina) Rubén García | (Italy) Top Run SRL | Mitsubishi Lancer Evo VII | 4:05:40.5 | +2:10.2 | 8 |
| 17 | 3 | 66 | (Oman) Hamed Al-Wahaibi | (United Kingdom) Nicky Beech | (Austria) Stohl Racing | Mitsubishi Lancer Evo VII | 4:06:17.3 | +2:47.0 | 6 |
| 18 | 4 | 55 | (United Kingdom) Martin Rowe | (United Kingdom) Trevor Agnew | (United Kingdom) David Sutton Cars Ltd | Subaru Impreza WRX STI N8 | 4:06:21.9 | +2:51.6 | 5 |
| 19 | 5 | 53 | (Peru) Ramón Ferreyros | (Mexico) Javier Marín | (Italy) Mauro Rally Tuning | Mitsubishi Lancer Evo VII | 4:06:44.8 | +3:14.5 | 4 |
| 21 | 6 | 51 | (Malaysia) Karamjit Singh | (Malaysia) Allen Oh | (Malaysia) Petronas EON Racing Team | Proton Pert | 4:07:17.1 | +3:46.8 | 3 |
| 22 | 7 | 60 | (United Kingdom) Niall McShea | (United Kingdom) Chris Patterson | (New Zealand) Neil Allport Motorsports | Mitsubishi Lancer Evo VI | 4:07:17.1 | +3:46.8 | 2 |
| 24 | 8 | 65 | (Sweden) Stig Blomqvist | (Venezuela) Ana Goñi | (United Kingdom) David Sutton Cars Ltd | Subaru Impreza WRX STI N8 | 4:14:26.7 | +10:56.4 | 1 |
| 28 | 9 | 57 | (Italy) Giovanni Manfrinato | (Italy) Claudio Condotta | (Italy) Top Run SRL | Mitsubishi Lancer Evo VI | 4:16:24.1 | +12:53.8 | 0 |
| 30 | 10 | 74 | (Italy) Fabio Frisiero | (Italy) Loris Roggia | (Italy) Motoring Club | Mitsubishi Lancer Evo VII | 4:20:29.3 | +16:59.0 | 0 |
| 31 | 11 | 80 | (Mexico) Ricardo Triviño | (Spain) Jordi Barrabés | (Mexico) Triviño Racing | Mitsubishi Lancer Evo VII | 4:21:31.9 | +18:01.6 | 0 |
| 32 | 12 | 64 | (Sweden) Joakim Roman | (Sweden) Ingrid Mitakidou | (Sweden) Milbrooks World Rally Team | Mitsubishi Lancer Evo V | 4:22:04.3 | +18:34.0 | 0 |
| 34 | 13 | 77 | (Italy) Alfredo De Dominicis | (Italy) Giovanni Bernacchini | Ralliart Italy | Mitsubishi Lancer Evo VI | 4:22:19.5 | +18:49.2 | 0 |
| 36 | 14 | 71 | (Bulgaria) Georgi Geradzhiev Jr. | (Bulgaria) Nikola Popov | (Bulgaria) Racing Team Bulgartabac | Mitsubishi Lancer Evo VI | 4:28:14.5 | +24:44.2 | 0 |
| 43 | 15 | 52 | (Spain) Daniel Solà | (Spain) Álex Romaní | (Italy) Mauro Rally Tuning | Mitsubishi Lancer Evo VII | 4:47:26.0 | +43:55.7 | 0 |
| Retired SS17 | | 70 | (Italy) Riccardo Errani | (Italy) Stefano Casadio | (Italy) Errani Team Group | Mitsubishi Lancer Evo VI | Over time limit | | 0 |
| Retired SS10 | | 67 | (Poland) Krzysztof Hołowczyc | (Poland) Łukasz Kurzeja | (Poland) Orlen Team | Mitsubishi Lancer Evo VI | Accident | | 0 |
| Retired SS10 | | 72 | (Romania) Constantin Aur | (Romania) Adrian Berghea | (Austria) Stohl Racing | Mitsubishi Lancer Evo VII | Gearbox | | 0 |
| Retired SS9 | | 61 | (Poland) Janusz Kulig | (Poland) Jarosław Baran | (Italy) Top Run SRL | Mitsubishi Lancer Evo VII | Electrical | | 0 |
| Retired SS6 | | 62 | (New Zealand) Peter 'Possum' Bourne | (Australia) Mark Stacey | (Japan) Subaru Production Rally Team | Subaru Impreza WRX STI | Engine | | 0 |
| Retired SS3 | | 76 | (Canada) Patrick Richard | (Sweden) Mikael Johansson | Subaru Rally Team Canada | Subaru Impreza WRX | Accident | | 0 |
| Retired SS1 | | 78 | (Poland) Łukasz Sztuka | (Poland) Zbigniew Cieślar | (Belgium) First Motorsport | Mitsubishi Lancer Evo V | Mechanical | | 0 |

==== Special stages ====
| Day | Stage | Stage name | Length | Winner | Car | Time | Class leaders |
|---|---|---|---|---|---|---|---|
| Leg 1 (11 Apr) | SS1 | Batley 1 | 19.82 km | (Japan) Toshihiro Arai | Subaru Impreza WRX STI N10 | 11:44.7 | (Japan) Toshihiro Arai |
| Leg 1 (11 Apr) | SS2 | Waipu Gorge 1 | 11.24 km | (Oman) Hamed Al-Wahaibi | Mitsubishi Lancer Evo VII | 7:07.7 | (Japan) Toshihiro Arai |
| Leg 1 (11 Apr) | SS3 | Brooks 1 | 16.03 km | (Japan) Toshihiro Arai | Subaru Impreza WRX STI N10 | 10:31.5 | (Japan) Toshihiro Arai |
| Leg 1 (11 Apr) | SS4 | New Cassidy | 21.64 km | (New Zealand) Peter 'Possum' Bourne | Subaru Impreza WRX STI | 13:03.6 | (New Zealand) Peter 'Possum' Bourne |
| Leg 1 (11 Apr) | SS5 | Paparoa Station 1 | 11.64 km | (Japan) Toshihiro Arai | Subaru Impreza WRX STI N10 | 6:49.0 | (Japan) Toshihiro Arai |
| Leg 1 (11 Apr) | SS6 | Batley 2 | 19.82 km | (Peru) Ramón Ferreyros | Mitsubishi Lancer Evo VII | 11:26.1 | (Japan) Toshihiro Arai |
| Leg 1 (11 Apr) | SS7 | Waipu Gorge 2 | 11.24 km | (Japan) Toshihiro Arai | Subaru Impreza WRX STI N10 | 7:10.3 | (Japan) Toshihiro Arai |
| Leg 1 (11 Apr) | SS8 | Brooks 2 | 16.03 km | (Peru) Ramón Ferreyros | Mitsubishi Lancer Evo VII | 10:11.6 | (Japan) Toshihiro Arai |
| Leg 1 (11 Apr) | SS9 | Paparoa Station 2 | 11.64 km | (Peru) Ramón Ferreyros | Mitsubishi Lancer Evo VII | 6:39.6 | (Japan) Toshihiro Arai |
| Leg 2 (12 Apr) | SS10 | Parahi — Ararua | 59.00 km | (Japan) Toshihiro Arai | Subaru Impreza WRX STI N10 | 35:52.4 | (Japan) Toshihiro Arai |
| Leg 2 (12 Apr) | SS11 | Mititat Finish | 20.15 km | (Oman) Hamed Al-Wahaibi | Mitsubishi Lancer Evo VII | 11:06.8 | (Japan) Toshihiro Arai |
| Leg 2 (12 Apr) | SS12 | Takatoka | 10.15 km | (United Kingdom) Niall McShea | Mitsubishi Lancer Evo VI | 5:34.1 | (Japan) Toshihiro Arai |
| Leg 2 (12 Apr) | SS13 | Parahi | 25.18 km | (Japan) Toshihiro Arai | Subaru Impreza WRX STI N10 | 13:50.0 | (Japan) Toshihiro Arai |
| Leg 2 (12 Apr) | SS14 | Ararua | 31.75 km | Notional stage time | | | (Japan) Toshihiro Arai |
| Leg 2 (12 Apr) | SS15 | Manukau Super 1 | 2.10 km | (Japan) Toshihiro Arai (Argentina) Marcos Ligato | Subaru Impreza WRX STI N10; Mitsubishi Lancer Evo VII | 1:37.7 | (Japan) Toshihiro Arai |
| Leg 2 (12 Apr) | SS16 | Manukau Super 2 | 2.10 km | (Malaysia) Karamjit Singh | Proton Pert | 1:50.7 | (Japan) Toshihiro Arai |
| Leg 3 (13 Apr) | SS17 | Te Akau South Revers | 27.34 km | (Spain) Daniel Solà | Mitsubishi Lancer Evo VII | 17:01.9 | (Japan) Toshihiro Arai |
| Leg 3 (13 Apr) | SS18 | Te Akau North | 32.37 km | (Spain) Daniel Solà | Mitsubishi Lancer Evo VII | 18:50.6 | (Japan) Toshihiro Arai |
| Leg 3 (13 Apr) | SS19 | Ridge — Campbell 1 | 16.45 km | (Japan) Toshihiro Arai | Subaru Impreza WRX STI N10 | 9:34.8 | (Japan) Toshihiro Arai |
| Leg 3 (13 Apr) | SS20 | Ridge — Campbell 2 | 16.45 km | (Japan) Toshihiro Arai | Subaru Impreza WRX STI N10 | 9:33.6 | (Japan) Toshihiro Arai |
| Leg 3 (13 Apr) | SS21 | Fyfe 1 | 10.60 km | (Oman) Hamed Al-Wahaibi | Mitsubishi Lancer Evo VII | 6:07.3 | (Japan) Toshihiro Arai |
| Leg 3 (13 Apr) | SS22 | Fyfe 2 | 10.60 km | (Spain) Daniel Solà | Mitsubishi Lancer Evo VII | 6:02.8 | (Japan) Toshihiro Arai |

==== Championship standings ====
| Pos. | Drivers' championships | | |
| Pos. | Move | Driver | Points |
|---|---|---|---|
| 1 | | (Sweden) Stig Blomqvist | 11 |
| 2 | | (Malaysia) Karamjit Singh | 11 |
| 3 | | (United Kingdom) Martin Rowe | 11 |
| 4 | New entry | (Japan) Toshihiro Arai | 10 |
| 5 | New entry | (Argentina) Marcos Ligato | 8 |
