= 2004 Rally New Zealand =

Rallying motorsport event

2004 Rally New Zealand 35th Propecia Rally New Zealand
Round 4 of the 2004 World Rally Championship season
← Previous event	Next event →
- Host country: New Zealand
- Rally base: Auckland
- Dates run: April 15, 2004 – April 18, 2004
- Stages: 23 (395.5 km; 245.8 miles)
- Stage surface: Gravel
- Overall distance: 1,398.36 km (868.90 miles)

Statistics
- Crews: 58 at start, 35 at finish

Overall results
- Overall winner: (Norway) Petter Solberg (United Kingdom) Phil Mills (Japan) 555 Subaru World Rally Team; Subaru Impreza S10 WRC '04

The 2004 Rally New Zealand (formally the 35th Propecia Rally New Zealand) was the fourth round of the 2004 World Rally Championship. The race was held over four days between 15 April and 18 April 2004, and was based in Auckland, New Zealand. Subaru's Petter Solberg won the race, his 6th win in the World Rally Championship.

== Background ==
=== Entry list ===
No.	Driver	Co-Driver	Entrant	Car	Tyre
World Rally Championship manufacturer entries
1	(Norway) Petter Solberg	(United Kingdom) Phil Mills	(Japan) 555 Subaru World Rally Team	Subaru Impreza S10 WRC '04	P
2	(Finland) Mikko Hirvonen	(Finland) Jarmo Lehtinen	(Japan) 555 Subaru World Rally Team	Subaru Impreza S10 WRC '04	P
3	(France) Sébastien Loeb	(Monaco) Daniel Elena	(France) Citroën Total WRT	Citroën Xsara WRC	M
4	(Spain) Carlos Sainz	(Spain) Marc Martí	(France) Citroën Total WRT	Citroën Xsara WRC	M
5	(Finland) Marcus Grönholm	(Finland) Timo Rautiainen	(France) Marlboro Peugeot Total	Peugeot 307 WRC	M
6	(Finland) Harri Rovanperä	(Finland) Risto Pietiläinen	(France) Marlboro Peugeot Total	Peugeot 307 WRC	M
7	(Estonia) Markko Märtin	(United Kingdom) Michael Park	(United Kingdom) Ford Motor Co. Ltd.	Ford Focus RS WRC '04	M
8	(Belgium) François Duval	(Belgium) Stéphane Prévot	(United Kingdom) Ford Motor Co. Ltd.	Ford Focus RS WRC '04	M
9	(France) Gilles Panizzi	(France) Hervé Panizzi	(Japan) Mitsubishi Motors	Mitsubishi Lancer WRC 04	M
10	(Italy) Kristian Sohlberg	(Italy) Kaj Lindström	(Japan) Mitsubishi Motors	Mitsubishi Lancer WRC 04	M
World Rally Championship entries
11	(Norway) Henning Solberg	(Norway) Cato Menkerud	(France) Bozian Racing	Peugeot 206 WRC	M
12	(Sweden) Daniel Carlsson	(Sweden) Matthias Andersson	(France) Bozian Racing	Peugeot 206 WRC	M
14	(Finland) Jari Viita	(Finland) Timo Hantunen	(United Kingdom) M-Sport	Ford Focus RS WRC '03	M
15	(Germany) Antony Warmbold	(United Kingdom) Gemma Price	(United Kingdom) Ford Motor Co. Ltd.	Ford Focus RS WRC '02	M
67	(New Zealand) Kevin Holmes	(New Zealand) Damon McLachlan	(New Zealand) Stumpy Holmes Rallysport	Subaru Impreza WRX STI	—N/a
76	(New Zealand) Malcolm Stewart	(New Zealand) Mike Fletcher	(New Zealand) S.M.S.	Mitsubishi Lancer Evo VI TME	—N/a
77	(New Zealand) Dermott Malley	(New Zealand) Patrick Malley	(New Zealand) Rally Drive NZ	Mitsubishi Lancer Evo IV	—N/a
80	(United Kingdom) Bruce Warburton	(New Zealand) Damon McLachlan	(United Kingdom) Provision	Subaru Impreza WRX	—N/a
82	(Japan) Hideaki Ito	(Japan) Akira Kojima	(Japan) Hideaki Ito	Subaru Impreza WRX	—N/a
83	(New Zealand) David Langford-Smith	(United Kingdom) Alan Hind	(New Zealand) David Langford-Smith	Subaru Impreza WRX	—N/a
PWRC entries
31	(Japan) Toshihiro Arai	(New Zealand) Tony Sircombe	(Japan) Subaru Team Arai	Subaru Impreza WRX STI	P
32	(Malaysia) Karamjit Singh	(Malaysia) Allen Oh	Proton Pert Malaysia	Proton Pert	P
33	(Spain) Daniel Solà	(Spain) Xavier Amigò	(Spain) Daniel Solà	Mitsubishi Lancer Evo VII	P
34	(United Kingdom) Niall McShea	(United Kingdom) Gordon Noble	(United Kingdom) Niall McShea	Subaru Impreza STI S10	P
35	(Argentina) Marcos Ligato	(Argentina) Rubén García	(Argentina) Marcos Ligato	Subaru Impreza WRX STI	—N/a
36	(Mexico) Ricardo Triviño	(Spain) Jordi Barrabés	(Mexico) Triviño Racing	Mitsubishi Lancer Evo VII	—N/a
37	(Sweden) Joakim Roman	(Sweden) Björn Nilsson	(Sweden) Joakim Roman	Subaru Impreza WRX STI	M
38	(Bulgaria) Georgi Geradzhiev Jr.	(Bulgaria) Nikola Popov	(Bulgaria) Racing Team Bulgartabac	Mitsubishi Lancer Evo VIII	—N/a
39	(United Kingdom) Alister McRae	(United Kingdom) David Senior	(United Kingdom) R.E.D World Rally Team	Subaru Impreza WRX STI	P
40	(Austria) Manfred Stohl	(Austria) Ilka Minor	(Austria) OMV World Rally Team	Mitsubishi Lancer Evo VII	P
41	(Finland) Jani Paasonen	(Finland) Sirkka Rautiainen	(Austria) OMV World Rally Team	Mitsubishi Lancer Evo VII	P
42	(United Kingdom) Mark Higgins	(United Kingdom) Michael Gibson	(United Kingdom) Mark Higgins	Subaru Impreza STI	—N/a
43	(Italy) Gianluigi Galli	(Italy) Guido D'Amore	(Italy) Gianluigi Galli	Mitsubishi Lancer Evo VII	P
44	(Qatar) Nasser Al-Attiyah	(United Kingdom) Chris Patterson	(Qatar) Nasser Al-Attiyah	Subaru Impreza WRX STI	—N/a
45	(Italy) Fabio Frisiero	(Italy) Giovanni Agnese	(Italy) Fabio Frisiero	Subaru Impreza WRX STI	—N/a
46	(Poland) Tomasz Kuchar	(Poland) Maciej Wodniak	(Poland) Tomasz Kuchar	Mitsubishi Lancer Evo VII	M
47	(Spain) Xavier Pons	(Spain) Oriol Julià	(Spain) Xavier Pons	Mitsubishi Lancer Evo VIII	M
48	(Japan) Fumio Nutahara	(Japan) Satoshi Hayashi	(Japan) Advan-Piaa Rally Team	Mitsubishi Lancer Evo VIII	Y
49	(Spain) Sergio López-Fombona	(Spain) Guifré Pujol	Ralliart Spain	Mitsubishi Lancer Evo VII	—N/a
50	(Germany) Sebastian Vollak	(Germany) Michael Kölbach	(Austria) OMV World Rally Team	Mitsubishi Lancer Evo VI	P

=== Itinerary ===
All dates and times are NZST (UTC+12).

Date	Time	No.	Stage name	Distance
Leg 1 — 141.92 km
15 April	19:25	SS1	Manukau Super 1	2.10 km
15 April	19:55	SS2	Manukau Super 2	2.10 km
16 April	10:13	SS3	Wairere 1	18.90 km
16 April	10:51	SS4	Cassidy	15.78 km
16 April	11:14	SS5	Bull	31.73 km
16 April	13:13	SS6	Wairere 2	18.90 km
16 April	13:51	SS7	Possum (Cassidy-Bull)	48.21 km
16 April	19:25	SS8	Manukau Super 3	2.10 km
16 April	19:46	SS9	Manukau Super 4	2.10 km
Leg 2 — 138.84 km
17 April	11:23	SS10	Parahi 1	25.18 km
17 April	12:16	SS11	Batley 1	16.97 km
17 April	12:44	SS12	Waipu Gorge 1	11.24 km
17 April	13:07	SS13	Brooks 1	16.03 km
17 April	15:13	SS14	Parahi 2	25.18 km
17 April	16:06	SS15	Batley 2	16.97 km
17 April	16:34	SS16	Waipu Gorge 2	11.24 km
17 April	16:57	SS17	Brooks 2	16.03 km
Leg 3 — 114.74 km
18 April	09:54	SS18	Te Hutewai 1	11.15 km
18 April	10:17	SS19	Te Papatapu 1	16.62 km
18 April	10:45	SS20	Whaanga Coast 1	29.60 km
18 April	12:28	SS21	Te Hutewai 2	11.15 km
18 April	12:51	SS22	Te Papatapu 2	16.62 km
18 April	13:19	SS23	Whaanga Coast 2	29.60 km

== Results ==
=== Overall ===
Pos.	No.	Driver	Co-driver	Team	Car	Time	Difference	Points
1	1	(Norway) Petter Solberg	(United Kingdom) Phil Mills	(Japan) 555 Subaru World Rally Team	Subaru Impreza S10 WRC '04	4:02:29.5		10
2	5	(Finland) Marcus Grönholm	(Finland) Timo Rautiainen	(France) Marlboro Peugeot Total	Peugeot 307 WRC	4:02:35.4	+5.9	8
3	7	(Estonia) Markko Märtin	(United Kingdom) Michael Park	(United Kingdom) Ford Motor Co. Ltd.	Ford Focus RS WRC '04	4:02:55.1	+25.6	6
4	3	(France) Sébastien Loeb	(Monaco) Daniel Elena	(France) Citroën Total WRT	Citroën Xsara WRC	4:03:34.7	+1:05.2	5
5	6	(Finland) Harri Rovanperä	(Finland) Risto Pietiläinen	(France) Marlboro Peugeot Total	Peugeot 307 WRC	4:04:53.2	+2:23.7	4
6	4	(Spain) Carlos Sainz	(Spain) Marc Martí	(France) Citroën Total WRT	Citroën Xsara WRC	4:05:38.4	+3:08.9	3
7	2	(Finland) Mikko Hirvonen	(Finland) Jarmo Lehtinen	(Japan) 555 Subaru World Rally Team	Subaru Impreza S10 WRC '04	4:08:12.0	+5:42.5	2
8	12	(Sweden) Daniel Carlsson	(Sweden) Matthias Andersson	(France) Bozian Racing	Peugeot 206 WRC	4:15:53.3	+13:23.8	1

=== World Rally Cars ===
==== Classification ====
Position		No.	Driver	Co-driver	Entrant	Car	Time	Difference	Points
Event	Class	No.	Driver	Co-driver	Entrant	Car	Time	Difference	Points
1	1	1	(Norway) Petter Solberg	(United Kingdom) Phil Mills	(Japan) 555 Subaru World Rally Team	Subaru Impreza S10 WRC '04	4:02:29.5		10
2	2	5	(Finland) Marcus Grönholm	(Finland) Timo Rautiainen	(France) Marlboro Peugeot Total	Peugeot 307 WRC	4:02:35.4	+5.9	8
3	3	7	(Estonia) Markko Märtin	(United Kingdom) Michael Park	(United Kingdom) Ford Motor Co. Ltd.	Ford Focus RS WRC '04	4:02:55.1	+25.6	6
4	4	3	(France) Sébastien Loeb	(Monaco) Daniel Elena	(France) Citroën Total WRT	Citroën Xsara WRC	4:03:34.7	+1:05.2	5
5	5	6	(Finland) Harri Rovanperä	(Finland) Risto Pietiläinen	(France) Marlboro Peugeot Total	Peugeot 307 WRC	4:04:53.2	+2:23.7	4
6	6	4	(Spain) Carlos Sainz	(Spain) Marc Martí	(France) Citroën Total WRT	Citroën Xsara WRC	4:05:38.4	+3:08.9	3
7	7	2	(Finland) Mikko Hirvonen	(Finland) Jarmo Lehtinen	(Japan) 555 Subaru World Rally Team	Subaru Impreza S10 WRC '04	4:08:12.0	+5:42.5	2
18	8	8	(Belgium) François Duval	(Belgium) Stéphane Prévot	(United Kingdom) Ford Motor Co. Ltd.	Ford Focus RS WRC '04	4:26:02.3	+23:32.8	0
Retired SS2		9	(France) Gilles Panizzi	(France) Hervé Panizzi	(Japan) Mitsubishi Motors	Mitsubishi Lancer WRC 04	Electronical		0
Retired SS2		10	(Italy) Kristian Sohlberg	(Italy) Kaj Lindström	(Japan) Mitsubishi Motors	Mitsubishi Lancer WRC 04	Electronical		0

==== Special stages ====
Day	Stage	Stage name	Length	Winner	Car	Time	Class leaders
Leg 1 (15 Apr)	SS1	Manukau Super 1	2.10 km	(Estonia) Markko Märtin	Ford Focus RS WRC '04	1:24.5	(Estonia) Markko Märtin
Leg 1 (15 Apr)	SS2	Manukau Super 2	2.10 km	(Norway) Petter Solberg	Subaru Impreza S10 WRC '04	1:22.4	(Norway) Petter Solberg
Leg 1 (16 Apr)	SS3	Wairere 1	18.90 km	(Norway) Petter Solberg (Finland) Marcus Grönholm	Subaru Impreza S10 WRC '04; Peugeot 307 WRC	10:42.5	(Norway) Petter Solberg
Leg 1 (16 Apr)	SS4	Cassidy	15.78 km	(Norway) Petter Solberg	Subaru Impreza S10 WRC '04	9:13.7	(Norway) Petter Solberg
Leg 1 (16 Apr)	SS5	Bull	31.73 km	(Finland) Marcus Grönholm	Peugeot 307 WRC	19:55.6	(Finland) Marcus Grönholm
Leg 1 (16 Apr)	SS6	Wairere 2	18.90 km	(Finland) Harri Rovanperä	Peugeot 307 WRC	10:27.2	(Norway) Petter Solberg
Leg 1 (16 Apr)	SS7	Possum (Cassidy-Bull)	48.21 km	(Finland) Harri Rovanperä	Peugeot 307 WRC	28:55.9	(Finland) Harri Rovanperä
Leg 1 (16 Apr)	SS8	Manukau Super 3	2.10 km	(Norway) Petter Solberg	Subaru Impreza S10 WRC '04	1:24.8	(Norway) Petter Solberg
Leg 1 (16 Apr)	SS9	Manukau Super 4	2.10 km	(Belgium) François Duval	Ford Focus RS WRC '04	1:24.0	(Norway) Petter Solberg
Leg 2 (17 Apr)	SS10	Parahi 1	25.18 km	(Finland) Marcus Grönholm	Peugeot 307 WRC	12:57.2	(Norway) Petter Solberg
Leg 2 (17 Apr)	SS11	Batley 1	16.97 km	(Finland) Marcus Grönholm	Peugeot 307 WRC	9:23.1	(Norway) Petter Solberg
Leg 2 (17 Apr)	SS12	Waipu Gorge 1	11.24 km	(Estonia) Markko Märtin	Ford Focus RS WRC '04	6:36.6	(Norway) Petter Solberg
Leg 2 (17 Apr)	SS13	Brooks 1	16.03 km	(Estonia) Markko Märtin	Ford Focus RS WRC '04	9:47.3	(Norway) Petter Solberg
Leg 2 (17 Apr)	SS14	Parahi 2	25.18 km	(Finland) Marcus Grönholm	Peugeot 307 WRC	12:41.2	(Norway) Petter Solberg
Leg 2 (17 Apr)	SS15	Batley 2	16.97 km	(Finland) Marcus Grönholm	Peugeot 307 WRC	9:08.3	(Norway) Petter Solberg
Leg 2 (17 Apr)	SS16	Waipu Gorge 2	11.24 km	(France) Sébastien Loeb	Citroën Xsara WRC	6:26.3	(Norway) Petter Solberg
Leg 2 (17 Apr)	SS17	Brooks 2	16.03 km	(Norway) Petter Solberg	Subaru Impreza S10 WRC '04	9:34.4	(Norway) Petter Solberg
Leg 3 (18 Apr)	SS18	Te Hutewai 1	11.15 km	(Finland) Marcus Grönholm	Peugeot 307 WRC	7:52.4	(Norway) Petter Solberg
Leg 3 (18 Apr)	SS19	Te Papatapu 1	16.62 km	(Finland) Marcus Grönholm	Peugeot 307 WRC	10:54.7	(Norway) Petter Solberg
Leg 3 (18 Apr)	SS20	Whaanga Coast 1	29.60 km	(France) Sébastien Loeb	Citroën Xsara WRC	21:31.4	(Finland) Marcus Grönholm
Leg 3 (18 Apr)	SS21	Te Hutewai 2	11.15 km	(Finland) Marcus Grönholm	Peugeot 307 WRC	7:46.0	(Finland) Marcus Grönholm
Leg 3 (18 Apr)	SS22	Te Papatapu 2	16.62 km	(Norway) Petter Solberg	Subaru Impreza S10 WRC '04	10:43.5	(Norway) Petter Solberg
Leg 3 (18 Apr)	SS23	Whaanga Coast 2	29.60 km	(Finland) Marcus Grönholm	Peugeot 307 WRC	20:47.1	(Norway) Petter Solberg

==== Championship standings ====
Pos.	Drivers' championships			Co-drivers' championships			Manufacturers' championships		
Pos.	Move	Driver	Points	Move	Co-driver	Points	Move	Manufacturer	Points
1	1	(Estonia) Markko Märtin	26	1	(United Kingdom) Michael Park	26		(United Kingdom) Ford Motor Co. Ltd.	47
2	1	(France) Sébastien Loeb	25	1	(Monaco) Daniel Elena	25		(France) Citroën Total WRT	38
3		(Finland) Marcus Grönholm	24		(Finland) Timo Rautiainen	24		(France) Marlboro Peugeot Total	33
4	1	(Norway) Petter Solberg	23	1	(United Kingdom) Phil Mills	23		(Japan) 555 Subaru World Rally Team	31
5	1	(Belgium) François Duval	14	1	(Belgium) Stéphane Prévot	14		(Japan) Mitsubishi Motors	5

=== Production World Rally Championship ===
==== Classification ====
Position		No.	Driver	Co-driver	Entrant	Car	Time	Difference	Points
Event	Class	No.	Driver	Co-driver	Entrant	Car	Time	Difference	Points
10	1	40	(Austria) Manfred Stohl	(Austria) Ilka Minor	(Austria) OMV World Rally Team	Mitsubishi Lancer Evo VII	4:18:53.3		10
12	2	35	(Argentina) Marcos Ligato	(Argentina) Rubén García	(Argentina) Marcos Ligato	Subaru Impreza WRX STI	4:20:09.6	+1:16.3	8
13	3	39	(United Kingdom) Alister McRae	(United Kingdom) David Senior	(United Kingdom) R.E.D World Rally Team	Subaru Impreza WRX STI	4:20:28.3	+1:35.0	6
14	4	41	(Finland) Jani Paasonen	(Finland) Sirkka Rautiainen	(Austria) OMV World Rally Team	Mitsubishi Lancer Evo VII	4:20:44.1	+1:50.8	5
15	5	31	(Japan) Toshihiro Arai	(New Zealand) Tony Sircombe	(Japan) Subaru Team Arai	Subaru Impreza WRX STI	4:20:52.1	+1:58.8	4
16	6	47	(Spain) Xavier Pons	(Spain) Oriol Julià	(Spain) Xavier Pons	Mitsubishi Lancer Evo VIII	4:23:20.4	+4:27.1	3
20	7	44	(Qatar) Nasser Al-Attiyah	(United Kingdom) Chris Patterson	(Qatar) Nasser Al-Attiyah	Subaru Impreza WRX STI	4:27:33.9	+8:40.6	2
21	8	32	(Malaysia) Karamjit Singh	(Malaysia) Allen Oh	Proton Pert Malaysia	Proton Pert	4:27:53.2	+8:59.9	1
23	9	49	(Spain) Sergio López-Fombona	(Spain) Guifré Pujol	Ralliart Spain	Mitsubishi Lancer Evo VII	4:33:29.7	+14:36.4	0
27	10	38	(Bulgaria) Georgi Geradzhiev Jr.	(Bulgaria) Nikola Popov	(Bulgaria) Racing Team Bulgartabac	Mitsubishi Lancer Evo VIII	4:38:06.3	+19:13.0	0
30	11	36	(Mexico) Ricardo Triviño	(Spain) Jordi Barrabés	(Mexico) Triviño Racing	Mitsubishi Lancer Evo VII	4:51:02.6	+32:09.3	0
Retired SS23		37	(Sweden) Joakim Roman	(Sweden) Björn Nilsson	(Sweden) Joakim Roman	Subaru Impreza WRX STI	Brakes		0
Retired SS21		34	(United Kingdom) Niall McShea	(United Kingdom) Gordon Noble	(United Kingdom) Niall McShea	Subaru Impreza STI S10	Accident		0
Retired SS20		33	(Spain) Daniel Solà	(Spain) Xavier Amigò	(Spain) Daniel Solà	Mitsubishi Lancer Evo VII	Accident		0
Retired SS18		50	(Germany) Sebastian Vollak	(Germany) Michael Kölbach	(Austria) OMV World Rally Team	Mitsubishi Lancer Evo VI	Over time limit		0
Retired SS13		42	(United Kingdom) Mark Higgins	(United Kingdom) Michael Gibson	(United Kingdom) Mark Higgins	Subaru Impreza STI	Fire		0
Retired SS6		48	(Japan) Fumio Nutahara	(Japan) Satoshi Hayashi	(Japan) Advan-Piaa Rally Team	Mitsubishi Lancer Evo VIII	Accident		0
Retired SS5		43	(Italy) Gianluigi Galli	(Italy) Guido D'Amore	(Italy) Gianluigi Galli	Mitsubishi Lancer Evo VII	Accident		0
Retired SS3		46	(Poland) Tomasz Kuchar	(Poland) Maciej Wodniak	(Poland) Tomasz Kuchar	Mitsubishi Lancer Evo VII	Fuel pump		0
Retired SS1		45	(Italy) Fabio Frisiero	(Italy) Giovanni Agnese	(Italy) Fabio Frisiero	Subaru Impreza WRX STI	Accident		0

==== Special stages ====
Day	Stage	Stage name	Length	Winner	Car	Time	Class leaders
Leg 1 (15 Apr)	SS1	Manukau Super 1	2.10 km	(Japan) Fumio Nutahara	Mitsubishi Lancer Evo VIII	1:31.2	(Japan) Fumio Nutahara
Leg 1 (15 Apr)	SS2	Manukau Super 2	2.10 km	(Finland) Jani Paasonen (Italy) Gianluigi Galli	Mitsubishi Lancer Evo VII; Mitsubishi Lancer Evo VII	1:29.6	(Japan) Fumio Nutahara
Leg 1 (16 Apr)	SS3	Wairere 1	18.90 km	(Austria) Manfred Stohl	Mitsubishi Lancer Evo VII	11:23.4	(Italy) Gianluigi Galli
Leg 1 (16 Apr)	SS4	Cassidy	15.78 km	(Argentina) Marcos Ligato	Subaru Impreza WRX STI	9:50.8	(Austria) Manfred Stohl
Leg 1 (16 Apr)	SS5	Bull	31.73 km	(Austria) Manfred Stohl	Mitsubishi Lancer Evo VII	21:08.6	(Austria) Manfred Stohl
Leg 1 (16 Apr)	SS6	Wairere 2	18.90 km	(Argentina) Marcos Ligato	Subaru Impreza WRX STI	11:06.6	(Austria) Manfred Stohl
Leg 1 (16 Apr)	SS7	Possum (Cassidy-Bull)	48.21 km	(Spain) Daniel Solà	Mitsubishi Lancer Evo VII	30:52.6	(Austria) Manfred Stohl
Leg 1 (16 Apr)	SS8	Manukau Super 3	2.10 km	(United Kingdom) Niall McShea	Subaru Impreza STI S10	1:24.8	(Austria) Manfred Stohl
Leg 1 (16 Apr)	SS9	Manukau Super 4	2.10 km	(Austria) Manfred Stohl	Mitsubishi Lancer Evo VII	1:31.9	(Austria) Manfred Stohl
Leg 2 (17 Apr)	SS10	Parahi 1	25.18 km	(Spain) Daniel Solà	Mitsubishi Lancer Evo VII	13:51.4	(Austria) Manfred Stohl
Leg 2 (17 Apr)	SS11	Batley 1	16.97 km	(Spain) Daniel Solà	Mitsubishi Lancer Evo VII	9:55.5	(Austria) Manfred Stohl
Leg 2 (17 Apr)	SS12	Waipu Gorge 1	11.24 km	(Spain) Daniel Solà	Mitsubishi Lancer Evo VII	7:00.2	(Austria) Manfred Stohl
Leg 2 (17 Apr)	SS13	Brooks 1	16.03 km	(Spain) Daniel Solà	Mitsubishi Lancer Evo VII	10:21.3	(Austria) Manfred Stohl
Leg 2 (17 Apr)	SS14	Parahi 2	25.18 km	(Spain) Daniel Solà	Mitsubishi Lancer Evo VII	13:42.1	(Spain) Daniel Solà
Leg 2 (17 Apr)	SS15	Batley 2	16.97 km	(Austria) Manfred Stohl	Mitsubishi Lancer Evo VII	9:54.8	(Spain) Daniel Solà
Leg 2 (17 Apr)	SS16	Waipu Gorge 2	11.24 km	(Spain) Daniel Solà	Mitsubishi Lancer Evo VII	6:56.7	(Spain) Daniel Solà
Leg 2 (17 Apr)	SS17	Brooks 2	16.03 km	(United Kingdom) Alister McRae	Subaru Impreza WRX STI	10:15.0	(Spain) Daniel Solà
Leg 3 (18 Apr)	SS18	Te Hutewai 1	11.15 km	(Japan) Toshihiro Arai	Subaru Impreza WRX STI	8:20.7	(Spain) Daniel Solà
Leg 3 (18 Apr)	SS19	Te Papatapu 1	16.62 km	(Austria) Manfred Stohl	Mitsubishi Lancer Evo VII	11:31.5	(Spain) Daniel Solà
Leg 3 (18 Apr)	SS20	Whaanga Coast 1	29.60 km	(Japan) Toshihiro Arai	Subaru Impreza WRX STI	22:36.7	(Austria) Manfred Stohl
Leg 3 (18 Apr)	SS21	Te Hutewai 2	11.15 km	(Finland) Jani Paasonen	Mitsubishi Lancer Evo VII	8:11.6	(Austria) Manfred Stohl
Leg 3 (18 Apr)	SS22	Te Papatapu 2	16.62 km	(Finland) Jani Paasonen	Mitsubishi Lancer Evo VII	11:24.2	(Austria) Manfred Stohl
Leg 3 (18 Apr)	SS23	Whaanga Coast 2	29.60 km	(United Kingdom) Alister McRae	Subaru Impreza WRX STI	22:15.3	(Austria) Manfred Stohl

==== Championship standings ====
Pos.	Drivers' championships		
Pos.	Move	Driver	Points
1		(Spain) Daniel Solà	16
2		(Japan) Toshihiro Arai	15
3		(Finland) Jani Paasonen	15
4		(United Kingdom) Alister McRae	14
5	New entry	(Austria) Manfred Stohl	10
