= Daniel Solà =

Spanish rally driver (born 1976)

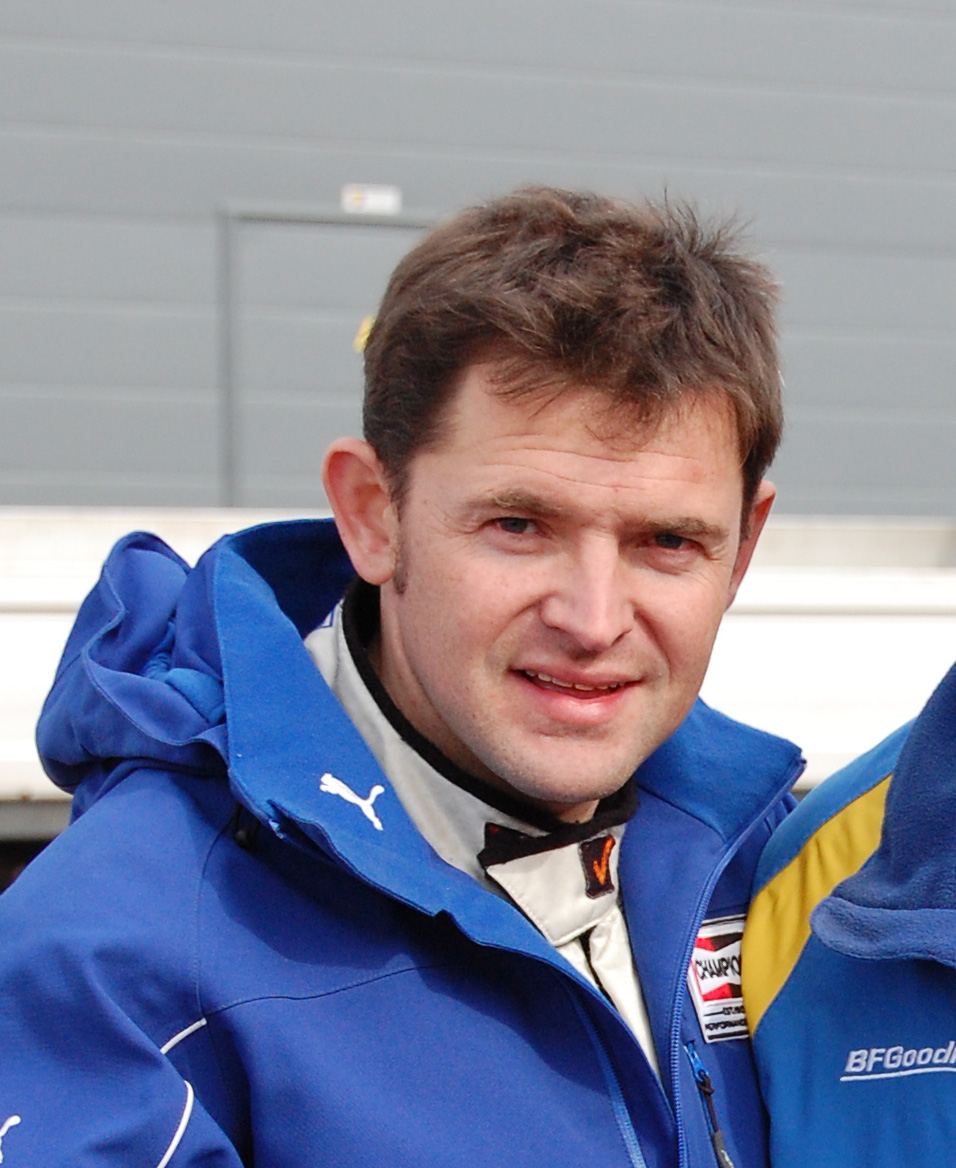
- Sola in 2008

Personal information
- Nationality: (Spain) Spanish
- Full name: Daniel Solà Villa
- Born: January 3, 1976 (age 50); Vic, Spain

World Rally Championship record
- Years active: 1997–1999, 2001–2005, 2007
- Co-driver: (Spain) Josep Martínez (Spain) David Moreno (Spain) Álex Romaní (Spain) Xavier Amigò (Spain) Carlos del Barrio (Spain) Óscar Sánchez
- Teams: Citroën, Mitsubishi, Ford
- Rallies: 39
- Championships: 0
- Rally wins: 0
- Podiums: 0
- Stage wins: 1
- Total points: 5
- First rally: 1997 Rally Catalunya
- Last rally: 2007 Wales Rally GB

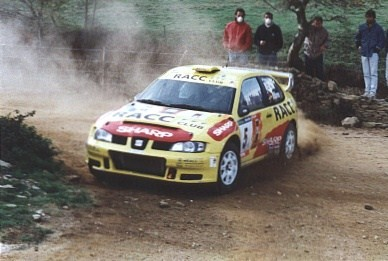
Solà at the 2001 Rallye de tierra de Cangas del Narcea in a SEAT Cordoba WRC Evo2.

Daniel Solà Villa (born 3 January 1976) is a Spanish rally driver. He won the Junior World Rally Championship in 2002 and the Spanish Rally Championship in 2006.

Daniel "Dani" Solà debuted in the World Rally Championship in 1997 and won the junior class (JWRC) title with Citroën in 2002. In 2003, he contested the Production World Rally Championship with Mitsubishi, finishing fifth overall, and made his first World Rally Car appearances in a Citroën Xsara WRC for the Citroën Total.

In the 2004 season, Solà drove in three WRC events as an official Mitsubishi driver with the Lancer WRC, recording his first points with a sixth place at his home event, the Rally Catalunya. In 2005, he raced for Ford with a Ford Focus RS WRC in six WRC events, but did not manage to secure a full-time factory drive for the 2006 season. He achieved his first stage win at the 2005 Rally Catalunya.

In 2006, Solà won the Spanish Rally Championship with Citroën C2 S1600, and in 2007, he competed in the Intercontinental Rally Challenge with a Honda Civic Type R.

== Complete WRC results ==
Year	Entrant	Car	1	2	3	4	5	6	7	8	9	10	11	12	13	14	15	16	WDC	Points
1997	Dani Solà	Peugeot 106 Rallye	MON	SWE	KEN	POR	ESP; Ret	FRA	ARG	GRE	NZL	FIN	IDN	ITA	AUS	GBR			NC	0
1998	Dani Solà	Peugeot 106 Rallye	MON	SWE	KEN	POR	ESP; Ret	FRA	ARG	GRE	NZL	FIN	ITA	AUS	GBR				NC	0
1999	Equipo RACC Competición	Peugeot 106 Rallye	MON	SWE	KEN	POR	ESP; 40	FRA	ARG	GRE	NZL	FIN	CHN	ITA	AUS	GBR			NC	0
2001	RACC Motor Sport	SEAT Córdoba WRC	MON	SWE	POR	ESP	ARG	CYP	GRE	KEN	FIN	NZL	ITA	FRA	AUS	GBR; 34			NC	0
2002	Dani Solà	Citroën Saxo S1600	MON; Ret	SWE	FRA	ESP; 19	CYP	ARG	GRE; 23	KEN		GER; 12	ITA; 17	NZL	AUS	GBR; 21			NC	0
2002	Dani Solà	Mitsubishi Lancer Evo V									FIN; Ret								NC	0
2003	Dani Solà	Mitsubishi Lancer Evo VII	MON	SWE; 32	TUR	NZL; 43	ARG; 12		CYP; Ret	GER; 22		AUS; 20	ITA	FRA; Ret	ESP				NC	0
2003	Citroën Sport	Citroën Xsara WRC						GRE; 12								GBR; Ret			NC	0
2003	Dani Solà	Mitsubishi Lancer Evo VI									FIN; 17								NC	0
2004	Dani Solà	Mitsubishi Lancer Evo VII	MON	SWE; 20	MEX; 11	NZL; Ret	CYP		TUR	ARG; EX	FIN		JPN	GBR	ITA	FRA; Ret		AUS; Ret	21st	3
2004	Mitsubishi Motors	Mitsubishi Lancer WRC 04						GRE; Ret				GER; Ret					ESP; 6		21st	3
2005	BP Ford World Rally Team	Ford Focus RS WRC 04	MON	SWE	MEX; Ret	NZL	ITA	CYP	TUR	GRE	ARG	FIN	GER; 12	GBR	JPN; Ret	FRA; Ret	ESP; Ret	AUS; 7	22nd	2
2007	JAS Motorsport	Honda Civic Type-R R3	MON	SWE	NOR	MEX	POR	ARG	ITA	GRE	FIN	GER	NZL	ESP; 20		JPN	IRE	GBR; 44	NC	0
2007	Twister Corse	Peugeot 207 S2000													FRA; 10				NC	0

=== JWRC Results ===
Year	Entrant	Car	1	2	3	4	5	6	JWRC	Points
2002	Dani Solà	Citroën Saxo S1600	MON; Ret	ESP; 1	GRE; 4	GER; 1	ITA; 3	GBR; 1	1st	37

=== PWRC results ===
Year	Entrant	Car	1	2	3	4	5	6	7	PWRC	Points
2003	Dani Solà	Mitsubishi Lancer Evo VII	SWE	NZL; 15	ARG; 2	CYP; Ret	GER; 1	AUS; 5	FRA; Ret	5th	22
2004	Dani Solà	Mitsubishi Lancer Evo VII	SWE; 3	MEX; 1	NZL; Ret	ARG; EX	GER	FRA; Ret	AUS; Ret	8th	16

== Official site ==
Media related to Dani Solà at Wikimedia Commons

- Official site

Sporting positions
Preceded by Sébastien Loeb	Junior World Rally Champion; 2002	Succeeded by Brice Tirabassi
