= Timo Rautiainen (co-driver) =

Finnish rally co-driver (born 1964)

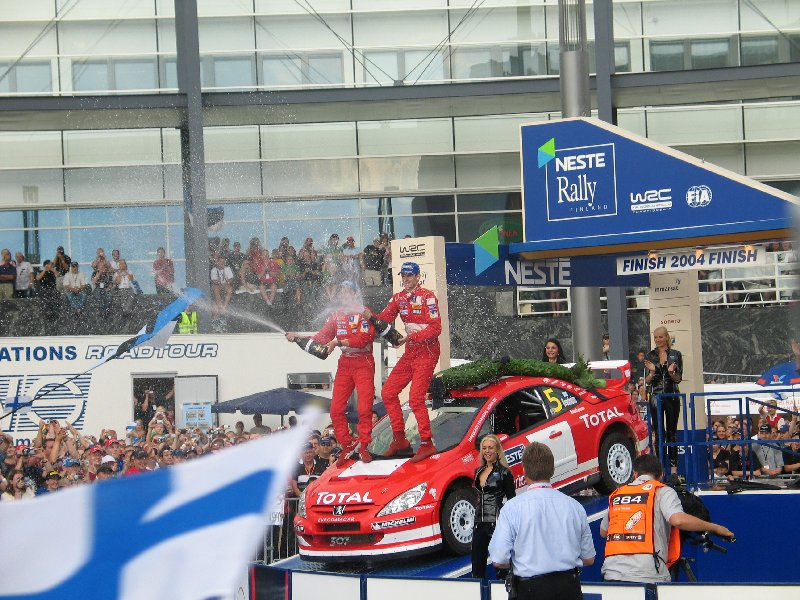
- Rautiainen and Grönholm celebrating victory at the 2004 Rally Finland

Personal information
- Nationality: (Finland) Finnish
- Full name: Timo Aulis Rautiainen
- Born: 13 November 1964 (age 62); Espoo, Finland

World Rally Championship record
- Years active: 1990, 1995–2007, 2009–2010, 2019
- Driver: (Finland) Marcus Grönholm
- Teams: Toyota, Peugeot, Ford
- Rallies: 145
- Co-championships: 2 (2000, 2002)
- Rally wins: 30
- Podiums: 61
- Stage wins: 540
- First rally: 1990 1000 Lakes Rally
- First win: 2000 Swedish Rally
- Last win: 2007 Rally New Zealand
- Last rally: 2019 Rally Sweden

Timo Aulis Rautiainen (born 13 November 1964) is a Finnish former rally co-driver. He is best known for co-driving for Marcus Grönholm from 1995 to 2007. Rautiainen and Grönholm drove for Peugeot (2000–05) and Ford (2006-07) in the World Rally Championship, and won 30 world rallies and two drivers' world championship titles together. Rautiainen is married to Grönholm's sister.

During his time with Grönholm at Peugeot, Rautiainen received an unusual injury during the 2004 edition of the Rally of Turkey when a loose metal rod from the track punctured his seat after Grönholm ran over it. The rod remained lodged for part of the remainder of the rally.

Rautiainen, along with Grönholm, appeared in the first season of Amazing Race Suomi where they finished fifth place.
