= OMV Rally Team =

- Full name: OMV Rally Team
- Tyres: Michelin

World Rally Championship history
- Debut: 2004 Swedish Rally
- Last event: 2007 Tour de Corse
- Manufacturers' Championships: 0
- Drivers' Championships: 0
- Rally wins: 0

OMV World Rally Team was a name used by several different World Rally Championship teams and entrants in the 2000s: the Kronos Racing (2005, 2007); and Bozian Racing (2006). The name was derived from commercial sponsorship arrangements, with financial support of OMV company. Mostly in support for Manfred Stohl.

== WRC Results ==
Year	Entrant	Car	No	Driver	1	2	3	4	5	6	7	8	9	10	11	12	13	14	15	16	WDC	Points	TC	Points
2004	OMV World Rally Team	Mitsubishi Lancer Evolution VII	40	(Austria) Manfred Stohl	MON	SWE; Ret	MEX; Ret	NZL; 10	CYP	GRE	TUR	ARG; 12	FIN	GER; 32	JPN	GBR	ITA	FRA	ESP	AUS; Ret	18th*	4*	-	-
2004	OMV World Rally Team	Mitsubishi Lancer Evolution VII	41	(Finland) Jani Paasonen	MON	SWE; 16	MEX; Ret	NZL; 14	CYP	GRE	TUR	ARG; 10	FIN	GER; 20	JPN	GBR	ITA	FRA	ESP	AUS; Ret	20th*	3*	-	-
2004	OMV World Rally Team	Mitsubishi Lancer Evolution VII	50	(Germany) Sebastian Vollak	MON	SWE; 39	MEX	NZL; Ret	CYP	GRE	TUR	ARG; Ret	FIN	GER; 25	JPN	GBR	ITA	FRA; 27	ESP	AUS; 16	-	0	-	-
2005	OMV World Rally Team	Citroën Xsara WRC	16	(Austria) Manfred Stohl	MON; 6	SWE	MEX	NZL; 9	ITA; 9	CYP; 2	TUR	GRE; 20	ARG; 8	FIN; Ret	GER; Ret	GBR; 5	JPN	FRA	ESP	AUS; 3	9th	22	-	-
2005	OMV World Rally Team	Citroën Xsara WRC	17	(Spain) Xavier Pons	MON	SWE	MEX	NZL	ITA	CYP	TUR	GRE; 10	ARG; 10	FIN; 12	GER; 9	GBR; 11	JPN	FRA; 7	ESP; 4	AUS; Ret	15th	7	-	-
2005	OMV World Rally Team	Citroën Xsara WRC	21	(Finland) Juuso Pykälistö	MON	SWE	MEX	NZL	ITA; 8	CYP	TUR	GRE	ARG	FIN	GER	GBR	JPN	FRA	ESP	AUS	27th	1	-	-
2006	OMV Peugeot Norway	Peugeot 307 WRC	7	(Austria) Manfred Stohl	MON; 4	SWE; 18	MEX; 3	ESP; 12	FRA; 7	ARG; 4	ITA; 7	GRE; Ret	GER; 5	FIN; 9	JPN; 5	CYP; 4	TUR; 8	AUS; 3	NZL; 3	GBR; 2	4th	54	4th	88
2006	OMV Peugeot Norway	Peugeot 307 WRC	8	(Norway) Henning Solberg	MON; Ret	SWE; 8	MEX; 5	ESP	FRA	ARG; 7	ITA; Ret	GRE; 5	GER	FIN; 4	JPN	CYP; 6	TUR; 3	AUS; Ret	NZL; 12	GBR; 11	8th	25	4th	88
2006	OMV Peugeot Norway	Peugeot 307 WRC	25	(Italy) Gigi Galli	MON	SWE	MEX	ESP	FRA; 9	ARG; 3	ITA; Ret	GRE	GER	FIN; 5	JPN	CYP	TUR	AUS	NZL	GBR	11th	15	4th	88
2007	OMV Kronos Citroën World Rally Team	Citroën Xsara WRC	5	(Austria) Manfred Stohl	MON; 10	SWE; 7	NOR; 12	MEX; 6	POR; 9	ARG; 8	ITA; 7	GRE; 8	FIN; Ret	GER; Ret	NZL; 12	ESP; Ret	FRA; 14	JPN; 6	IRE; Ret	GBR; 8	9th	13	5th	45
2007	OMV Kronos Citroën World Rally Team	Citroën Xsara WRC	6	(Sweden) Daniel Carlsson	MON	SWE; 5	NOR; 7	MEX	POR; 6	ARG	ITA; Ret	GRE	FIN								14th	9	5th	45
2007	OMV Kronos Citroën World Rally Team	Citroën Xsara WRC	6	(Belgium) François Duval										GER; 2	NZL	ESP; 5	FRA; Ret	JPN	IRE	GBR	10th	12	5th	45

== PWRC results ==
Year	Entrant	Car	No	Driver	1	2	3	4	5	6	7	8	PWRC	Points
2004	OMV World Rally Team	Mitsubishi Lancer Evolution VII	40	(Austria) Manfred Stohl	SWE; Ret	MEX; Ret	NZL; 1	ARG; 2	GER; 9	FRA	AUS; Ret		6th	18
2004	OMV World Rally Team	Mitsubishi Lancer Evolution VII	41	(Finland) Jani Paasonen	SWE; 1	MEX; Ret	NZL; 4	ARG; 1	GER; 5	FRA	AUS; Ret		3rd	29
2004	OMV World Rally Team	Mitsubishi Lancer Evolution VII	50	(Germany) Sebastian Vollak	SWE; 13	MEX	NZL; Ret	ARG; Ret	GER; 6	FRA; 10	AUS; 6		13th	6
2005	OMV World Rally Team	Mitsubishi Lancer Evolution VII	41	(United Kingdom) Natalie Barratt	SWE	NZL; 12					JPN; Ret	AUS; 11	16th	2
2005	OMV World Rally Team	Mitsubishi Lancer Evolution VIII	41	(United Kingdom) Natalie Barratt			CYP; Ret	TUR; 15	ARG				16th	2
2005	OMV World Rally Team	Subaru Impreza WRX STI	41	(United Kingdom) Natalie Barratt						GBR; 7			16th	2
2006	OMV CEE World Rally Team	Mitsubishi Lancer Evolution VIII	43	(Bulgaria) Jasen Popov	MON; Ret								-	0
2006	OMV CEE World Rally Team	Mitsubishi Lancer Evolution IX	43	(Bulgaria) Jasen Popov							AUS; Ret		-	0
2006	OMV CEE World Rally Team	Mitsubishi Lancer Evolution VIII	43	(Czech Republic) Štěpán Vojtěch		MEX; 7	ARG						17th	2
2006	OMV CEE World Rally Team	Mitsubishi Lancer Evolution IX	43	(Slovenia) Andrej Jereb				GRE; 13	JPN				-	0
2006	OMV CEE World Rally Team	Mitsubishi Lancer Evolution VIII	43	(Germany) Aaron Burkart						CYP; Ret			-	0
2006	OMV CEE World Rally Team	Mitsubishi Lancer Evolution VIII	43	(United Kingdom) Natalie Barratt								NZL; Ret	-	0
2007	OMV Bixxol Rally Team	Mitsubishi Lancer Evolution IX	43	(Hungary) Balazs Benik	SWE	MEX; 12	ARG			JPN	IRE	GBR	-	0
2007	OMV Bixxol Rally Team	Mitsubishi Lancer Evolution IX	43	(Slovenia) Andrej Jereb				GRE; 11	NZL; 10	JPN	IRE	GBR	-	0
2007	OMV Bixxol Rally Team	Mitsubishi Lancer Evolution IX	43	(Romania) Claudiu David						JPN; 11	IRE	GBR; Ret	-	0
2007	OMV Bixxol Rally Team	Mitsubishi Lancer Evolution IX	43	(Bulgaria) Jasen Popov							IRE; 9		-	0
2007	OMV Bixxol Rally Team	Mitsubishi Lancer Evolution IX	49	(Czech Republic) Štěpán Vojtěch	SWE	MEX; 6	ARG; 12	GRE	NZL; 19	JPN	IRE; 5	GBR; 8	18th	8

== JWRC results ==
Year	Entrant	Car	No	Driver	1	2	3	4	5	6	7	8	9	Pos.	Points
2006	OMV Rally Team	Citroën C2 S1600	54	(Germany) Aaron Burkart	SWE	ESP; Ret	FRA; 7	ARG	ITA; 5	GER; 6	FIN	TUR; 12	GBR; 3	12th	15
