= Štěpán Vojtěch =

Czech rally driver (born 1977)

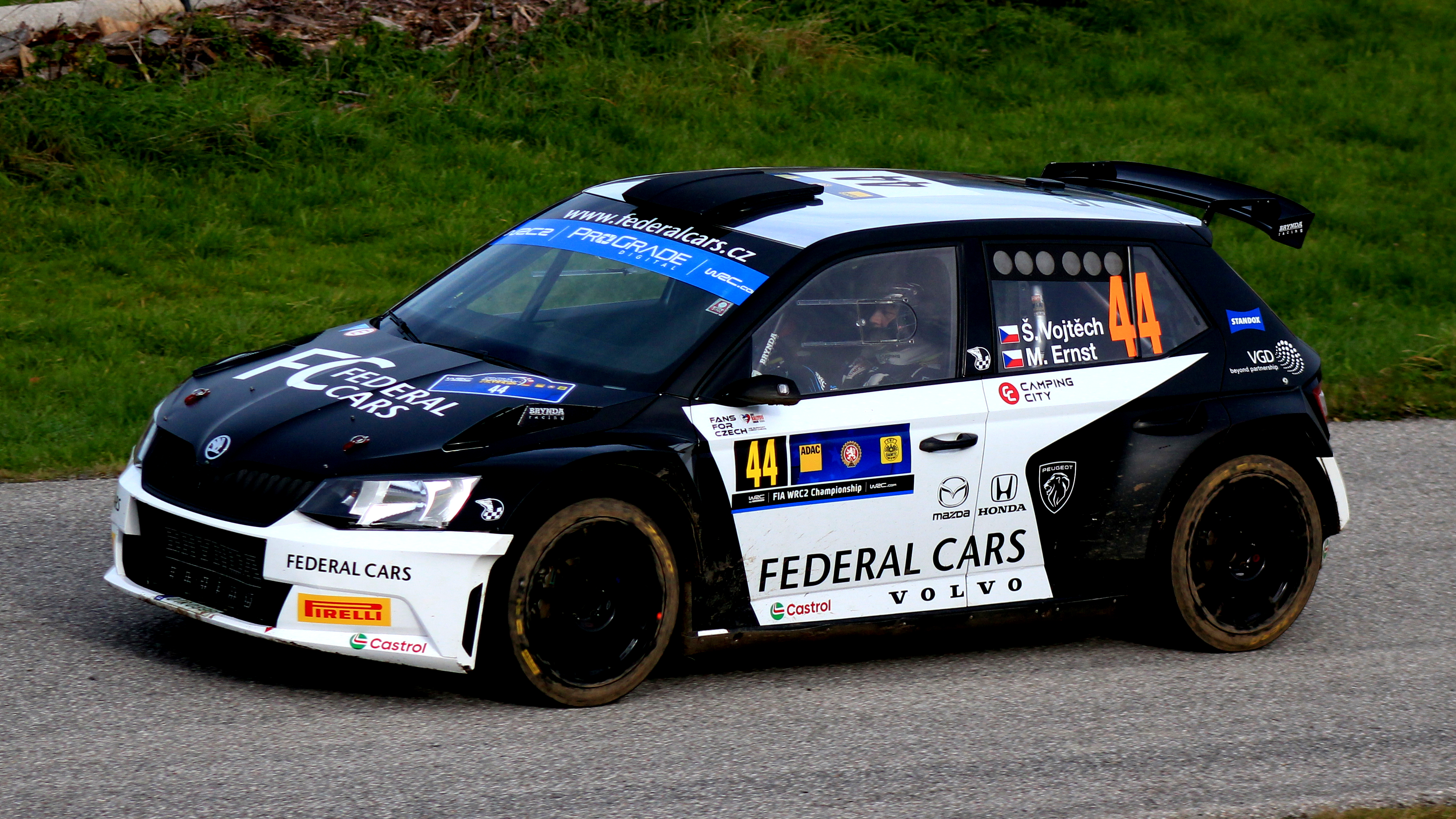
- Vojtěch during the 2023 Central European Rally

Personal information
- Nationality: (Czech Republic) Czech
- Born: 23 April 1977 (age 49)

World Rally Championship record
- Years active: 2005–2007, 2023
- Co-driver: (Czech Republic) Michal Ernst
- Teams: OMV World Rally Team
- Rallies: 11
- Championships: 0
- Rally wins: 0
- Podiums: 0
- Stage wins: 0
- Total points: 0
- First rally: 2005 Rallye Deutschland
- Last rally: 2023 Central European Rally

Štěpán Vojtěch (born 23 April 1977) is a Czech rally driver. He used to race in the PWRC in the 2006 and 2007 season.

== Racing record ==
=== Complete WRC results ===
| Year | Entrant | Car | 1 | 2 | 3 | 4 | 5 | 6 | 7 | 8 | 9 | 10 | 11 | 12 | 13 | 14 | 15 | 16 | WDC | Points |
|---|---|---|---|---|---|---|---|---|---|---|---|---|---|---|---|---|---|---|---|---|
| 2005 | Štěpán Vojtěch | Peugeot 206 WRC | MON | SWE | MEX | NZL | ITA | CYP | TUR | GRC | ARG | FIN | GER; 27 | GBR | JPN | FRA | ESP | AUS | NC | 0 |
| 2006 | OMV CEE World Rally Team | Mitsubishi Lancer Evo VIII | MON | SWE | MEX; 18 | | | ARG; Ret | ITA | GRE | | | | | | | | | NC | 0 |
| 2006 | Štěpán Vojtěch | Peugeot 206 WRC | | | | ESP; 14 | FRA | | | | | | | | | | | | NC | 0 |
| 2006 | Štěpán Vojtěch | Peugeot 307 WRC | | | | | | | | | GER; Ret | FIN | JPN | CYP | TUR | AUS | NZL | GBR | NC | 0 |
| 2007 | OMV Bixxol Rally Team | Mitsubishi Lancer Evo IX | MON | SWE | NOR | MEX; 16 | POR | ARG; 25 | ITA | GRE | FIN | GER | NZL; 55 | ESP | FRA | JPN | IRE; 20 | GBR; 25 | NC | 0 |
| 2023 | Štěpán Vojtěch | Škoda Fabia R5 | MON | SWE | MEX | CRO | POR | ITA | KEN | EST | FIN | GRE | CHL | EUR; 21 | JPN | | | | NC | 0 |

=== PWRC results ===
| Year | Entrant | Car | 1 | 2 | 3 | 4 | 5 | 6 | 7 | 8 | Pos. | Points |
|---|---|---|---|---|---|---|---|---|---|---|---|---|
| 2006 | OMV CEE World Rally Team | Mitsubishi Lancer Evo VIII | MON | MEX; 7 | ARG | GRE | JPN | CYP | AUS | NZL | 17th | 2 |
| 2007 | OMV Bixxol Rally Team | Mitsubishi Lancer Evo IX | SWE | MEX; 6 | ARG; 12 | GRE | NZL; 19 | JPN | IRE; 5 | GBR; 8 | 18th | 8 |

=== WRC-2 results ===
| Year | Entrant | Car | 1 | 2 | 3 | 4 | 5 | 6 | 7 | 8 | 9 | 10 | 11 | 12 | 13 | Pos | Points |
|---|---|---|---|---|---|---|---|---|---|---|---|---|---|---|---|---|---|
| 2023 | Štěpán Vojtěch | Škoda Fabia R5 | MON | SWE | MEX | CRO | POR | ITA | KEN | EST | FIN | GRE | CHL | EUR; 11 | JPN | NC | 0 |

=== Czech Rally Championship results ===
| Year | Entrant | Car | 1 | 2 | 3 | 4 | 5 | 6 | 7 | 8 | 9 | MMČR | Points |
|---|---|---|---|---|---|---|---|---|---|---|---|---|---|
| 2001 | TSV Total | Toyota Celica GT-Four | ŠUM; Ret | VAL; Ret | KRU; 12 | BOH; Ret | BAR; Ret | PŘÍ; 11 | TŘE; 5 | | | 16th | 16 |
| 2002 | TSV Total | Toyota Corolla WRC | ŠUM; Ret | VAL; 3 | KRU; Ret | BOH; 37 | BAR; 9 | PŘÍ; Ret | TŘE; Ret | | | 14th | 85 |
| 2003 | JM Racing | Toyota Corolla WRC | ŠUM; 7 | VAL; 2 | KRU; Ret | | | | | | | 6th | 64 |
| 2003 | JM Racing | Peugeot 206 WRC | | | | BOH; Ret | BAR; Ret | PŘÍ; 3 | TŘE; 5 | | | 6th | 64 |
| 2004 | OMV Rally Team | Peugeot 206 WRC | JÄN | ŠUM; Ret | TAT; 5 | KRU; 5 | BOH; Ret | BAR; Ret | PŘÍ; Ret | TŘE | | 13th | 24 |
| 2005 | OMV Rally Team | Peugeot 206 WRC | JÄN; Ret | ŠUM; 2 | VAL; 2 | TAT; 3 | KRU; 1 | BOH; 4 | BAR | PŘÍ; 1 | TŘE | 2nd | 142 |
| 2009 | Thermica Rally Team | Škoda Fabia S2000 | VAL | ŠUM | KRU | HUS | BAR | PŘÍ | BOH; Ret | | | - | 0 |
| 2010 | XTG Rally Team | Škoda Fabia S2000 | VAL | ŠUM | KRU | HUS | BOH; Ret | BAR | PŘÍ | | | - | 0 |
