= 2004 Rally Mexico =

Rallying motorsport event

2004 Rally Mexico 1st Corona Rally Mexico
Round 3 of the 2004 World Rally Championship season
← Previous event	Next event →
- Host country: Mexico
- Rally base: León
- Dates run: March 12, 2004 – March 14, 2004
- Stages: 15 (394.43 km; 245.09 miles)
- Stage surface: Gravel
- Overall distance: 1,040.67 km (646.64 miles)

Statistics
- Crews: 54 at start, 26 at finish

Overall results
- Overall winner: (Estonia) Markko Märtin (United Kingdom) Michael Park (United Kingdom) Ford Motor Co. Ltd. Ford Focus RS WRC '03

The 2004 Rally Mexico (formally the 1st Corona Rally Mexico) was the third round of the 2004 World Rally Championship. The race was held over three days between 12 March and 14 March 2004, and was based in León, Mexico. Ford's Markko Märtin won the race, his 3rd win in the World Rally Championship.

== Background ==
=== Entry list ===
No.	Driver	Co-Driver	Entrant	Car	Tyre
World Rally Championship manufacturer entries
1	(Norway) Petter Solberg	(United Kingdom) Phil Mills	(Japan) 555 Subaru World Rally Team	Subaru Impreza S10 WRC '04	P
2	(Finland) Mikko Hirvonen	(Finland) Jarmo Lehtinen	(Japan) 555 Subaru World Rally Team	Subaru Impreza S10 WRC '04	P
3	(France) Sébastien Loeb	(Monaco) Daniel Elena	(France) Citroën Total WRT	Citroën Xsara WRC	M
4	(Spain) Carlos Sainz	(Spain) Marc Martí	(France) Citroën Total WRT	Citroën Xsara WRC	M
5	(Finland) Marcus Grönholm	(Finland) Timo Rautiainen	(France) Marlboro Peugeot Total	Peugeot 307 WRC	M
6	(Finland) Harri Rovanperä	(Finland) Risto Pietiläinen	(France) Marlboro Peugeot Total	Peugeot 307 WRC	M
7	(Estonia) Markko Märtin	(United Kingdom) Michael Park	(United Kingdom) Ford Motor Co. Ltd.	Ford Focus RS WRC '03	M
8	(Belgium) François Duval	(Belgium) Stéphane Prévot	(United Kingdom) Ford Motor Co. Ltd.	Ford Focus RS WRC '03	M
9	(France) Gilles Panizzi	(France) Hervé Panizzi	(Japan) Mitsubishi Motors	Mitsubishi Lancer WRC 04	M
10	(Italy) Gianluigi Galli	(Italy) Guido D'Amore	(Japan) Mitsubishi Motors	Mitsubishi Lancer WRC 04	M
World Rally Championship entries
11	(Germany) Antony Warmbold	(United Kingdom) Gemma Price	(United Kingdom) Ford Motor Co. Ltd.	Ford Focus RS WRC '02	M
12	(Finland) Jussi Välimäki	(Finland) Jakke Honkanen	(Finland) Jussi Välimäki	Hyundai Accent WRC3	M
14	(Argentina) Luís Pérez Companc	(Argentina) Jose Maria Volta	(France) Bozian Racing	Peugeot 206 WRC	M
PWRC entries
31	(Japan) Toshihiro Arai	(New Zealand) Tony Sircombe	(Japan) Subaru Team Arai	Subaru Impreza WRX STI	P
32	(Malaysia) Karamjit Singh	(Malaysia) Allen Oh	Proton Pert Malaysia	Proton Pert	P
33	(Spain) Daniel Solà	(Spain) Xavier Amigò	(Spain) Daniel Solà	Mitsubishi Lancer Evo VII	P
34	(United Kingdom) Niall McShea	(United Kingdom) Gordon Noble	(United Kingdom) Niall McShea	Subaru Impreza WRX STI	P
35	(Argentina) Marcos Ligato	(Argentina) Rubén García	(Argentina) Marcos Ligato	Subaru Impreza WRX STI	—N/a
36	(Mexico) Ricardo Triviño	(Spain) Jordi Barrabés	(Mexico) Triviño Racing	Mitsubishi Lancer Evo VII	—N/a
37	(Sweden) Joakim Roman	(Sweden) Björn Nilsson	(Sweden) Joakim Roman	Subaru Impreza WRX STI	M
39	(United Kingdom) Alister McRae	(United Kingdom) David Senior	(United Kingdom) R.E.D World Rally Team	Subaru Impreza WRX STI	P
40	(Austria) Manfred Stohl	(Austria) Ilka Minor	(Austria) OMV World Rally Team	Mitsubishi Lancer Evo VII	P
41	(Finland) Jani Paasonen	(Finland) Sirkka Rautiainen	(Austria) OMV World Rally Team	Mitsubishi Lancer Evo VII	P
42	(United Kingdom) Mark Higgins	(United Kingdom) Michael Gibson	(United Kingdom) Mark Higgins	Subaru Impreza STI	—N/a
44	(Qatar) Nasser Al-Attiyah	(United Kingdom) Steve Lancaster	(Qatar) Nasser Al-Attiyah	Subaru Impreza STI	—N/a
46	(Poland) Tomasz Kuchar	(Poland) Maciej Wodniak	Kuchar Team Poland	Mitsubishi Lancer Evo VI	M
47	(Spain) Xavier Pons	(Spain) Oriol Julià	(Spain) Xavier Pons	Mitsubishi Lancer Evo VIII	M
48	(Japan) Fumio Nutahara	(Japan) Satoshi Hayashi	(Japan) Advan-Piaa Rally Team	Mitsubishi Lancer Evo VIII	Y
49	(Spain) Sergio López-Fombona	(Spain) Guifré Pujol	Ralliart Spain	Mitsubishi Lancer Evo VII	—N/a

=== Itinerary ===
All dates and times are CST (UTC−6).

Date	Time	No.	Stage name	Distance
Leg 1 — 108.03 km
12 March	10:33	SS1	Ortega — La Esperanza 1	29.06 km
12 March	11:21	SS2	Santana — Cubilete	22.61 km
12 March	14:16	SS3	Ibarrilla — El Zauco	27.30 km
12 March	15:34	SS4	Ortega — La Esperanza 2	29.06 km
Leg 2 — 154.34 km
13 March	08:55	SS5	Duarte — Nvo Valle 1	25.58 km
13 March	09:43	SS6	Derramadero — Chichimequillas 1	23.56 km
13 March	10:59	SS7	El Gigante — El Zauco 1	28.03 km
13 March	13:57	SS8	Duarte — Nvo Valle 2	25.58 km
13 March	14:45	SS9	Derramadero — Chichimequillas 2	23.56 km
13 March	16:01	SS10	El Gigante — El Zauco 2	28.03 km
Leg 3 — 132.06 km
14 March	07:17	SS11	Ibarrilla — Mesa 1	30.47 km
14 March	08:14	SS12	Alfaro — Nuevo Valle 1	27.85 km
14 March	08:57	SS13	Derramadero — Comanjilla	15.42 km
14 March	11:18	SS14	Ibarrilla — Mesa 2	30.47 km
14 March	12:15	SS15	Alfaro — Nuevo Valle 2	27.85 km

== Results ==
=== Overall ===
Pos.	No.	Driver	Co-driver	Team	Car	Time	Difference	Points
1	7	(Estonia) Markko Märtin	(United Kingdom) Michael Park	(United Kingdom) Ford Motor Co. Ltd.	Ford Focus RS WRC '03	4:06:46.2		10
2	8	(Belgium) François Duval	(Belgium) Stéphane Prévot	(United Kingdom) Ford Motor Co. Ltd.	Ford Focus RS WRC '03	4:07:28.7	+42.5	8
3	4	(Spain) Carlos Sainz	(Spain) Marc Martí	(France) Citroën Total WRT	Citroën Xsara WRC	4:08:07.1	+1:20.9	6
4	1	(Norway) Petter Solberg	(United Kingdom) Phil Mills	(Japan) 555 Subaru World Rally Team	Subaru Impreza S10 WRC '04	4:10:00.9	+3:14.7	5
5	2	(Finland) Mikko Hirvonen	(Finland) Jarmo Lehtinen	(Japan) 555 Subaru World Rally Team	Subaru Impreza S10 WRC '04	4:10:22.4	+3:36.2	4
6	5	(Finland) Marcus Grönholm	(Finland) Timo Rautiainen	(France) Marlboro Peugeot Total	Peugeot 307 WRC	4:10:44.6	+3:58.4	3
7	12	(Finland) Jussi Välimäki	(Finland) Jakke Honkanen	(Finland) Jussi Välimäki	Hyundai Accent WRC3	4:18:03.1	+11:16.9	2
8	9	(France) Gilles Panizzi	(France) Hervé Panizzi	(Japan) Mitsubishi Motors	Mitsubishi Lancer WRC 04	4:18:16.8	+11:30.6	1

=== World Rally Cars ===
==== Classification ====
Position		No.	Driver	Co-driver	Entrant	Car	Time	Difference	Points
Event	Class	No.	Driver	Co-driver	Entrant	Car	Time	Difference	Points
1	1	7	(Estonia) Markko Märtin	(United Kingdom) Michael Park	(United Kingdom) Ford Motor Co. Ltd.	Ford Focus RS WRC '03	4:06:46.2		10
2	2	8	(Belgium) François Duval	(Belgium) Stéphane Prévot	(United Kingdom) Ford Motor Co. Ltd.	Ford Focus RS WRC '03	4:07:28.7	+42.5	8
3	3	4	(Spain) Carlos Sainz	(Spain) Marc Martí	(France) Citroën Total WRT	Citroën Xsara WRC	4:08:07.1	+1:20.9	6
4	4	1	(Norway) Petter Solberg	(United Kingdom) Phil Mills	(Japan) 555 Subaru World Rally Team	Subaru Impreza S10 WRC '04	4:10:00.9	+3:14.7	5
5	5	2	(Finland) Mikko Hirvonen	(Finland) Jarmo Lehtinen	(Japan) 555 Subaru World Rally Team	Subaru Impreza S10 WRC '04	4:10:22.4	+3:36.2	4
6	6	5	(Finland) Marcus Grönholm	(Finland) Timo Rautiainen	(France) Marlboro Peugeot Total	Peugeot 307 WRC	4:10:44.6	+3:58.4	3
8	7	9	(France) Gilles Panizzi	(France) Hervé Panizzi	(Japan) Mitsubishi Motors	Mitsubishi Lancer WRC 04	4:18:16.8	+11:30.6	1
10	8	6	(Finland) Harri Rovanperä	(Finland) Risto Pietiläinen	(France) Marlboro Peugeot Total	Peugeot 307 WRC	4:26:06.5	+19:20.3	0
Retired SS7		3	(France) Sébastien Loeb	(Monaco) Daniel Elena	(France) Citroën Total WRT	Citroën Xsara WRC	Oil sump		0
Retired SS6		10	(Italy) Gianluigi Galli	(Italy) Guido D'Amore	(Japan) Mitsubishi Motors	Mitsubishi Lancer WRC 04	Suspension		0

==== Special stages ====
Day	Stage	Stage name	Length	Winner	Car	Time	Class leaders
Leg 1 (12 Mar)	SS1	Ortega — La Esperanza 1	29.06 km	(Norway) Petter Solberg	Subaru Impreza S10 WRC '04	16:38.7	(Norway) Petter Solberg
Leg 1 (12 Mar)	SS2	Santana — Cubilete	22.61 km	(France) Sébastien Loeb	Citroën Xsara WRC	12:25.6	(Norway) Petter Solberg
Leg 1 (12 Mar)	SS3	Ibarrilla — El Zauco	27.30 km	(Norway) Petter Solberg	Subaru Impreza S10 WRC '04	17:13.9	(Norway) Petter Solberg
Leg 1 (12 Mar)	SS4	Ortega — La Esperanza 2	29.06 km	(France) Sébastien Loeb	Citroën Xsara WRC	16:22.9	(France) Sébastien Loeb
Leg 2 (13 Mar)	SS5	Duarte — Nvo Valle 1	25.58 km	(Norway) Petter Solberg	Subaru Impreza S10 WRC '04	18:30.3	(France) Sébastien Loeb
Leg 2 (13 Mar)	SS6	Derramadero — Chichimequillas 1	23.56 km	(Norway) Petter Solberg	Subaru Impreza S10 WRC '04	13:51.8	(France) Sébastien Loeb
Leg 2 (13 Mar)	SS7	El Gigante — El Zauco 1	28.03 km	(Norway) Petter Solberg	Subaru Impreza S10 WRC '04	19:22.8	(Estonia) Markko Märtin
Leg 2 (13 Mar)	SS8	Duarte — Nvo Valle 2	25.58 km	(Norway) Petter Solberg	Subaru Impreza S10 WRC '04	18:32.8	(Estonia) Markko Märtin
Leg 2 (13 Mar)	SS9	Derramadero — Chichimequillas 2	23.56 km	(Norway) Petter Solberg	Subaru Impreza S10 WRC '04	13:47.5	(Estonia) Markko Märtin
Leg 2 (13 Mar)	SS10	El Gigante — El Zauco 2	28.03 km	(Norway) Petter Solberg	Subaru Impreza S10 WRC '04	19:12.6	(Estonia) Markko Märtin
Leg 3 (14 Mar)	SS11	Ibarrilla — Mesa 1	30.47 km	(Estonia) Markko Märtin	Ford Focus RS WRC '03	18:34.6	(Estonia) Markko Märtin
Leg 3 (14 Mar)	SS12	Alfaro — Nuevo Valle 1	27.85 km	(Spain) Carlos Sainz	Citroën Xsara WRC	16:18.7	(Estonia) Markko Märtin
Leg 3 (14 Mar)	SS13	Derramadero — Comanjilla	15.42 km	(Norway) Petter Solberg	Subaru Impreza S10 WRC '04	8:46.2	(Estonia) Markko Märtin
Leg 3 (14 Mar)	SS14	Ibarrilla — Mesa 2	30.47 km	(Finland) Marcus Grönholm	Peugeot 307 WRC	18:04.9	(Estonia) Markko Märtin
Leg 3 (14 Mar)	SS15	Alfaro — Nuevo Valle 2	27.85 km	(Finland) Marcus Grönholm	Peugeot 307 WRC	16:00.2	(Estonia) Markko Märtin

==== Championship standings ====
Pos.	Drivers' championships			Co-drivers' championships			Manufacturers' championships		
Pos.	Move	Driver	Points	Move	Co-driver	Points	Move	Manufacturer	Points
1		(France) Sébastien Loeb	20		(Monaco) Daniel Elena	20	1	(United Kingdom) Ford Motor Co. Ltd.	40
2	1	(Estonia) Markko Märtin	20	1	(United Kingdom) Michael Park	20	1	(France) Citroën Total WRT	30
3	1	(Finland) Marcus Grönholm	16	1	(Finland) Timo Rautiainen	16		(France) Marlboro Peugeot Total	21
4	1	(Belgium) François Duval	14	1	(Belgium) Stéphane Prévot	14		(Japan) 555 Subaru World Rally Team	19
5	1	(Norway) Petter Solberg	13	1	(United Kingdom) Phil Mills	13		(Japan) Mitsubishi Motors	5

=== Production World Rally Championship ===
==== Classification ====
Position		No.	Driver	Co-driver	Entrant	Car	Time	Difference	Points
Event	Class	No.	Driver	Co-driver	Entrant	Car	Time	Difference	Points
16	1	33	(Spain) Daniel Solà	(Spain) Xavier Amigò	(Spain) Daniel Solà	Mitsubishi Lancer Evo VII	4:26:44.9		10
17	2	31	(Japan) Toshihiro Arai	(New Zealand) Tony Sircombe	(Japan) Subaru Team Arai	Subaru Impreza WRX STI	4:28:51.2	+2:06.3	8
20	3	34	(United Kingdom) Niall McShea	(United Kingdom) Gordon Noble	(United Kingdom) Niall McShea	Subaru Impreza WRX STI	4:29:21.8	+2:36.9	6
22	4	32	(Malaysia) Karamjit Singh	(Malaysia) Allen Oh	Proton Pert Malaysia	Proton Pert	4:30:51.7	+4:06.8	5
24	5	47	(Spain) Xavier Pons	(Spain) Oriol Julià	(Spain) Xavier Pons	Mitsubishi Lancer Evo VIII	4:32:30.4	+5:45.5	4
26	6	48	(Japan) Fumio Nutahara	(Japan) Satoshi Hayashi	(Japan) Advan-Piaa Rally Team	Mitsubishi Lancer Evo VIII	4:34:06.1	+7:21.2	3
32	7	36	(Mexico) Ricardo Triviño	(Spain) Jordi Barrabés	(Mexico) Triviño Racing	Mitsubishi Lancer Evo VII	4:41:13.6	+14:28.7	2
33	8	37	(Sweden) Joakim Roman	(Sweden) Björn Nilsson	(Sweden) Joakim Roman	Subaru Impreza WRX STI	4:48:01.1	+21:16.2	1
Retired SS10		41	(Finland) Jani Paasonen	(Finland) Sirkka Rautiainen	(Austria) OMV World Rally Team	Mitsubishi Lancer Evo VII	Radiator		0
Retired SS9		35	(Argentina) Marcos Ligato	(Argentina) Rubén García	(Argentina) Marcos Ligato	Subaru Impreza WRX STI	Radiator		0
Retired SS9		46	(Poland) Tomasz Kuchar	(Poland) Maciej Wodniak	Kuchar Team Poland	Mitsubishi Lancer Evo VI	Radiator		0
Retired SS5		39	(United Kingdom) Alister McRae	(United Kingdom) David Senior	(United Kingdom) R.E.D World Rally Team	Subaru Impreza WRX STI	Accident		0
Retired SS5		40	(Austria) Manfred Stohl	(Austria) Ilka Minor	(Austria) OMV World Rally Team	Mitsubishi Lancer Evo VII	Accident		0
Retired SS5		49	(Spain) Sergio López-Fombona	(Spain) Guifré Pujol	Ralliart Spain	Mitsubishi Lancer Evo VII	Excluded		0
Retired SS3		44	(Qatar) Nasser Al-Attiyah	(United Kingdom) Steve Lancaster	(Qatar) Nasser Al-Attiyah	Subaru Impreza STI	Gearbox		0
Retired SS1		42	(United Kingdom) Mark Higgins	(United Kingdom) Michael Gibson	(United Kingdom) Mark Higgins	Subaru Impreza STI	Gearbox		0

==== Special stages ====
Day	Stage	Stage name	Length	Winner	Car	Time	Class leaders
Leg 1 (12 Mar)	SS1	Ortega — La Esperanza 1	29.06 km	(Japan) Toshihiro Arai	Subaru Impreza S10 WRC '04	17:55.2	(Japan) Toshihiro Arai
Leg 1 (12 Mar)	SS2	Santana — Cubilete	22.61 km	(Spain) Daniel Solà	Mitsubishi Lancer Evo VII	13:22.7	(Spain) Daniel Solà
Leg 1 (12 Mar)	SS3	Ibarrilla — El Zauco	27.30 km	(Spain) Daniel Solà	Mitsubishi Lancer Evo VII	18:37.5	(Spain) Daniel Solà
Leg 1 (12 Mar)	SS4	Ortega — La Esperanza 2	29.06 km	(Finland) Jani Paasonen	Mitsubishi Lancer Evo VII	18:17.3	(Spain) Daniel Solà
Leg 2 (13 Mar)	SS5	Duarte — Nvo Valle 1	25.58 km	(Spain) Daniel Solà	Mitsubishi Lancer Evo VII	19:59.7	(Spain) Daniel Solà
Leg 2 (13 Mar)	SS6	Derramadero — Chichimequillas 1	23.56 km	(Spain) Daniel Solà	Mitsubishi Lancer Evo VII	14:56.7	(Spain) Daniel Solà
Leg 2 (13 Mar)	SS7	El Gigante — El Zauco 1	28.03 km	(Spain) Daniel Solà	Mitsubishi Lancer Evo VII	21:04.3	(Spain) Daniel Solà
Leg 2 (13 Mar)	SS8	Duarte — Nvo Valle 2	25.58 km	(Spain) Daniel Solà	Mitsubishi Lancer Evo VII	19:58.0	(Spain) Daniel Solà
Leg 2 (13 Mar)	SS9	Derramadero — Chichimequillas 2	23.56 km	(Spain) Daniel Solà	Mitsubishi Lancer Evo VII	15:06.3	(Spain) Daniel Solà
Leg 2 (13 Mar)	SS10	El Gigante — El Zauco 2	28.03 km	(Spain) Daniel Solà	Mitsubishi Lancer Evo VII	20:56.0	(Spain) Daniel Solà
Leg 3 (14 Mar)	SS11	Ibarrilla — Mesa 1	30.47 km	(Spain) Daniel Solà	Mitsubishi Lancer Evo VII	20:15.6	(Spain) Daniel Solà
Leg 3 (14 Mar)	SS12	Alfaro — Nuevo Valle 1	27.85 km	(Japan) Toshihiro Arai	Subaru Impreza S10 WRC '04	17:45.1	(Spain) Daniel Solà
Leg 3 (14 Mar)	SS13	Derramadero — Comanjilla	15.42 km	(Japan) Toshihiro Arai	Subaru Impreza S10 WRC '04	9:34.6	(Spain) Daniel Solà
Leg 3 (14 Mar)	SS14	Ibarrilla — Mesa 2	30.47 km	(United Kingdom) Niall McShea	Subaru Impreza WRX STI	19:55.0	(Spain) Daniel Solà
Leg 3 (14 Mar)	SS15	Alfaro — Nuevo Valle 2	27.85 km	(Japan) Toshihiro Arai	Subaru Impreza S10 WRC '04	17:28.1	(Spain) Daniel Solà

==== Championship standings ====
Pos.	Drivers' championships		
Pos.	Move	Driver	Points
1	2	(Spain) Daniel Solà	16
2	4	(Japan) Toshihiro Arai	11
3	2	(Finland) Jani Paasonen	10
4	2	(United Kingdom) Alister McRae	8
5	New entry	(United Kingdom) Niall McShea	6
