= 2004 Rally Argentina =

8th round of the 2004 World Rally Championship

2004 Rally Argentina 24th CTI Movil Rally Argentina
Round 8 of the 2004 World Rally Championship season
← Previous event	Next event →
- Host country: Argentina
- Rally base: Villa Carlos Paz
- Dates run: July 15, 2004 – July 18, 2004
- Stages: 26 (382.63 km; 237.76 miles)
- Stage surface: Gravel
- Overall distance: 1,344.00 km (835.12 miles)

Statistics
- Crews: 69 at start, 28 at finish

Overall results
- Overall winner: (Spain) Carlos Sainz (Spain) Marc Martí (France) Citroen Total

The 2004 Rally Argentina (formally the 24th CTI Movil Rally Argentina) was the eighth round of the 2004 World Rally Championship. The race was held over four days between 15 and 18 July 2004, and was based in Villa Carlos Paz, Argentina. Citroen's Carlos Sainz won the race, his 26th and final win in the World Rally Championship.

== Background ==
=== Entry list ===
No.	Driver	Co-Driver	Entrant	Car	Tyre
World Rally Championship manufacturer entries
1	(Norway) Petter Solberg	(United Kingdom) Phil Mills	(Japan) 555 Subaru World Rally Team	Subaru Impreza S10 WRC '04	P
2	(Finland) Mikko Hirvonen	(Finland) Jarmo Lehtinen	(Japan) 555 Subaru World Rally Team	Subaru Impreza S10 WRC '04	P
3	(France) Sébastien Loeb	(Monaco) Daniel Elena	(France) Citroën Total WRT	Citroën Xsara WRC	MI
4	(Spain) Carlos Sainz	(Spain) Marc Martí	(France) Citroën Total WRT	Citroën Xsara WRC	MI
5	(Finland) Marcus Grönholm	(Finland) Timo Rautiainen	(France) Marlboro Peugeot Total	Peugeot 307 WRC	MI
6	(Finland) Harri Rovanperä	(Finland) Risto Pietiläinen	(France) Marlboro Peugeot Total	Peugeot 307 WRC	MI
7	(Estonia) Markko Märtin	(United Kingdom) Michael Park	(United Kingdom) Ford Motor Co. Ltd.	Ford Focus RS WRC '04	MI
8	(Belgium) François Duval	(Belgium) Stéphane Prévot	(United Kingdom) Ford Motor Co. Ltd.	Ford Focus RS WRC '04	MI
9	(France) Gilles Panizzi	(France) Hervé Panizzi	(Japan) Mitsubishi Motors	Mitsubishi Lancer WRC 04	MI
10	(Finland) Kristian Sohlberg	(Finland) Kaj Lindström	(Japan) Mitsubishi Motors	Mitsubishi Lancer WRC 04	MI
World Rally Championship entries
11	(Germany) Antony Warmbold	(United Kingdom) Gemma Price	(Germany) Antony Warmbold	Ford Focus RS WRC '02	MI
61	(Argentina) Luís Pérez Companc	(Argentina) Jose Maria Volta	(France) Bozian Racing	Peugeot 206 WRC	MI
84	(Argentina) Gonzalo Alenaz	(Argentina) Diego Picchi	(Argentina) Gonzalo Alenaz	Subaru Impreza 555	—N/a
85	(Argentina) Rodrigo Alenaz	(Argentina) Martin De Carli	(Argentina) Rodrigo Alenaz	Subaru Impreza WRX STI	—N/a
PWRC entries
31	(Japan) Toshihiro Arai	(New Zealand) Tony Sircombe	(Japan) Subaru Team Arai	Subaru Impreza WRX STI	P
32	(Malaysia) Karamjit Singh	(Malaysia) Allen Oh	Proton Pert Malaysia	Proton Pert	P
33	(Spain) Daniel Solà	(Spain) Xavier Amigò	(Spain) Daniel Solà	Mitsubishi Lancer Evo VII	P
34	(United Kingdom) Niall McShea	(United Kingdom) Gordon Noble	(United Kingdom) Niall McShea	Subaru Impreza STI S10	—N/a
35	(Argentina) Marcos Ligato	(Argentina) Diego Curletto	(Argentina) Marcos Ligato	Subaru Impreza WRX STI	—N/a
36	(Mexico) Ricardo Triviño	(Spain) Jordi Barrabés	(Mexico) Triviño Racing	Mitsubishi Lancer Evo VII	—N/a
38	(Bulgaria) Georgi Geradzhiev Jr.	(Bulgaria) Nikola Popov	(Bulgaria) Racing Team Bulgartabac	Mitsubishi Lancer Evo VIII	—N/a
40	(Austria) Manfred Stohl	(Austria) Ilka Minor	(Austria) OMV World Rally Team	Mitsubishi Lancer Evo VII	P
41	(Finland) Jani Paasonen	(Finland) Jani Vainikka	(Austria) OMV World Rally Team	Mitsubishi Lancer Evo VII	P
42	(United Kingdom) Mark Higgins	(United Kingdom) Michael Gibson	(United Kingdom) Mark Higgins	Subaru Impreza STI	—N/a
43	(Italy) Gianluigi Galli	(Italy) Guido D'Amore	(Italy) Gianluigi Galli	Mitsubishi Lancer Evo VII	P
44	(Qatar) Nasser Al-Attiyah	(United Kingdom) Chris Patterson	(Qatar) Nasser Al-Attiyah	Subaru Impreza STI	—N/a
45	(Italy) Fabio Frisiero	(Italy) Giovanni Agnese	(Italy) Fabio Frisiero	Subaru Impreza WRX STI	—N/a
47	(Spain) Xavier Pons	(Spain) Oriol Julià	(Spain) Xavier Pons	Mitsubishi Lancer Evo VIII	MI
48	(Japan) Fumio Nutahara	(Japan) Satoshi Hayashi	(Japan) Advan-Piaa Rally Team	Mitsubishi Lancer Evo VIII	Y
49	(Spain) Sergio López-Fombona	(Spain) Guifré Pujol	Ralliart Spain	Mitsubishi Lancer Evo VII	—N/a
50	(Germany) Sebastian Vollak	(Germany) Michael Kölbach	(Austria) OMV World Rally Team	Mitsubishi Lancer Evo VI	P
Other notable entries
65	(Argentina) Gabriel Pozzo	(Argentina) Daniel Stillo	(Argentina) Gabriel Pozzo	Subaru Impreza WRX STI	—N/a

=== Itinerary ===
All dates and times are ART (UTC−3).

Date	Time	No.	Stage name	Distance
Leg 1 — 168.28 km
15 July	19:10	SS1	Complejo Pro-Racing (Lane A) 1	3.02 km
15 July	19:12	SS2	Complejo Pro-Racing (Lane B) 1	3.02 km
16 July	08:43	SS3	La Cumbre — Agua de Oro 1	21.35 km
16 July	09:33	SS4	Ascochinga — La Cumbre 1	28.83 km
16 July	10:36	SS5	Villa Giardino — La Falda 1	16.76 km
16 July	11.16	SS6	Valle Hermoso — Casa Grande 1	11:08 km
16 July	14:17	SS7	La Cumbre — Agua de Oro 2	21.35 km
16 July	15:07	SS8	Ascochinga — La Cumbre 2	22.28 km
16 July	16:10	SS9	Villa Giardino — La Falde 1	16.76 km
16 July	16:42	SS10	Valle Hermoso — Casa Grande 2	22.28 km
16 July	19:10	SS11	Complejo Pro-Racing (Lane A) 2	3.02 km
16 July	19:12	SS12	Complejo Pro-Racing (Lane B) 2	3.02 km
Leg 2 — 129.39 km
17 July	08:48	SS13	Amboy — Santa Rosa de Calamuchita 1	20.43 km
17 July	09:31	SS14	Santa Rosa de Calamuchita — San Agustin	22.57 km
17 July	10:24	SS15	Las Bajadas — Villa del Dique	16.42 km
17 July	11:20	SS16	Amboy — Santa Rosa de Calamuchita 2	20.43 km
17 July	14:39	SS17	Carlos Paz — Cabalango 1	14.81 km
17 July	15:12	SS18	Tanti — Cosquin 1	9.50 km
17 July	15:49	SS19	Cosquin — Villa Allende 1	19.19 km
17 July	19:10	SS20	Complejo Pro-Racing (Lane A) 3	3.02 km
17 July	19:12	SS21	Complejo Pro-Racing (Lane B) 3	3.02 km
Leg 3 — 84.96 km
18 July	08:44	SS22	Carlos Paz — Cabalango 2	14.81 km
18 July	09:17	SS23	Tanti — Cosquin 2	9.50 km
18 July	09:54	SS24	Cosquin — Villa Allende 2	19.19 km
18 July	13:44	SS25	Mina Clavero — Giulio Cesare	24.69 km
18 July	14:31	SS26	El Condor — Copina	16.77 km

== Results ==
=== Overall ===
Pos.	No.	Driver	Co-driver	Team	Car	Time	Difference	Points
1	4	(Spain) Carlos Sainz	(Spain) Marc Martí	(France) Citroën Total WRT	Citroën Xsara WRC	4:23:11.0		10
2	3	(France) Sébastien Loeb	(Monaco) Daniel Elena	(France) Citroën Total WRT	Citroën Xsara WRC	44:24:43.5	+1:32.5	8
3	8	(Belgium) François Duval	(Belgium) Stéphane Prévot	(United Kingdom) Ford Motor Co. Ltd.	Ford Focus RS WRC '04	4:27:34.5	+4:23.5	6
4	2	(Finland) Mikko Hirvonen	(Finland) Jarmo Lehtinen	(Japan) 555 Subaru World Rally Team	Subaru Impreza S10 WRC '04	4:31:38.7	+8:27.7	5
5	6	(Finland) Harri Rovanperä	(Finland) Risto Pietiläinen	(France) Marlboro Peugeot Total	Peugeot 307 WRC	4:33:10.9	+9:59.9	4
6	61	(Argentina) Luís Pérez Companc	(Argentina) Jose Maria Volta	(France) Bozian Racing	Peugeot 206 WRC	4:39:35.7	+16:24.7	3
7	9	(France) Gilles Panizzi	(France) Hervé Panizzi	(Japan) Mitsubishi Motors	Mitsubishi Lancer WRC 04	4:40:50.0	+17:39.0	2
8	65	(Argentina) Gabriel Pozzo	(Argentina) Daniel Stillo	(Argentina) Gabriel Pozzo	Subaru Impreza WRX STI	4:43:49.6	+20:38.6	1

=== World Rally Cars ===
==== Classification ====
Position		No.	Driver	Co-driver	Entrant	Car	Time	Difference	Points
Event	Class	No.	Driver	Co-driver	Entrant	Car	Time	Difference	Points
1	1	4	(Spain) Carlos Sainz	(Spain) Marc Martí	(France) Citroën Total WRT	Citroën Xsara WRC	4:23:11.0		10
2	2	3	(France) Sébastien Loeb	(Monaco) Daniel Elena	(France) Citroën Total WRT	Citroën Xsara WRC	44:24:43.5	+1:32.5	8
3	3	8	(Belgium) François Duval	(Belgium) Stéphane Prévot	(United Kingdom) Ford Motor Co. Ltd.	Ford Focus RS WRC '04	4:27:34.5	+4:23.5	6
4	4	2	(Finland) Mikko Hirvonen	(Finland) Jarmo Lehtinen	(Japan) 555 Subaru World Rally Team	Subaru Impreza S10 WRC '04	4:31:38.7	+8:27.7	5
5	5	6	(Finland) Harri Rovanperä	(Finland) Risto Pietiläinen	(France) Marlboro Peugeot Total	Peugeot 307 WRC	4:33:10.9	+9:59.9	4
7	6	9	(France) Gilles Panizzi	(France) Hervé Panizzi	(Japan) Mitsubishi Motors	Mitsubishi Lancer WRC 04	4:40:50.0	+17:39.0	2
Retired SS19		5	(Finland) Marcus Grönholm	(Finland) Timo Rautiainen	(France) Marlboro Peugeot Total	Peugeot 307 WRC	Accident		0
Retired SS19		10	(Finland) Kristian Sohlberg	(Finland) Kaj Lindström	(Japan) Mitsubishi Motors	Mitsubishi Lancer WRC 04	Gearbox		0
Retired SS10		1	(Norway) Petter Solberg	(United Kingdom) Phil Mills	(Japan) 555 Subaru World Rally Team	Subaru Impreza S10 WRC '04	Engine		0
Retired SS5		7	(Estonia) Markko Märtin	(United Kingdom) Michael Park	(United Kingdom) Ford Motor Co. Ltd.	Ford Focus RS WRC '04	Accident		0

==== Special stages ====
Day	Stage	Stage name	Length	Winner	Car	Time	Class leaders
Leg 1 (15 Jul)	SS1	Complejo Pro-Racing (Lane A) 1	3.02 km	(Norway) Petter Solberg	Subaru Impreza S10 WRC '04	2:09.1	(Norway) Petter Solberg
Leg 1 (15 Jul)	SS2	Complejo Pro-Racing (Lane B) 1	3.02 km	(Estonia) Markko Märtin	Ford Focus RS WRC '04	2:10.2	(Norway) Petter Solberg
Leg 1 (16 Jul)	SS3	La Cumbre — Agua de Oro 1	21.35 km	(Norway) Petter Solberg	Subaru Impreza S10 WRC '04	18:16.6	(Norway) Petter Solberg
Leg 1 (16 Jul)	SS4	Ascochinga — La Cumbre 1	28.83 km	(Norway) Petter Solberg	Subaru Impreza S10 WRC '04	18:41.7	(Norway) Petter Solberg
Leg 1 (16 Jul)	SS5	Villa Giardino — La Falda 1	16.76 km	(France) Sébastien Loeb	Citroën Xsara WRC	11:41.6	(Finland) Marcus Grönholm
Leg 1 (16 Jul)	SS6	Valle Hermoso — Casa Grande 1	11:08 km	(France) Sébastien Loeb	Citroën Xsara WRC	7:10.6	(Finland) Marcus Grönholm
Leg 1 (16 Jul)	SS7	La Cumbre — Agua de Oro 2	21.35 km	(Finland) Marcus Grönholm	Peugeot 307 WRC	18:06.2	(Finland) Marcus Grönholm
Leg 1 (16 Jul)	SS8	Ascochinga — La Cumbre 2	22.28 km	(Spain) Carlos Sainz	Citroën Xsara WRC	18:41.2	(Spain) Carlos Sainz
Leg 1 (16 Jul)	SS9	Villa Giardino — La Falde 1	16.76 km	(Finland) Marcus Grönholm	Peugeot 307 WRC	11:40.4	(Finland) Marcus Grönholm
Leg 1 (16 Jul)	SS10	Valle Hermoso — Casa Grande 2	22.28 km	(Finland) Marcus Grönholm	Peugeot 307 WRC	7:19.2	(Finland) Marcus Grönholm
Leg 1 (16 Jul)	SS11	Complejo Pro-Racing (Lane A) 2	3.02 km	(Finland) Marcus Grönholm	Peugeot 307 WRC	2:14.4	(Finland) Marcus Grönholm
Leg 1 (16 Jul)	SS12	Complejo Pro-Racing (Lane B) 2	3.02 km	(Finland) Marcus Grönholm	Peugeot 307 WRC	2:13.1	(Finland) Marcus Grönholm
Leg 2 (17 Jul)	SS13	Amboy — Santa Rosa de Calamuchita 1	20.43 km	(Norway) Petter Solberg	Subaru Impreza S10 WRC '04	10:34.4	(Finland) Marcus Grönholm
Leg 2 (17 Jul)	SS14	Santa Rosa de Calamuchita — San Agustin	22.57 km	(Finland) Marcus Grönholm	Peugeot 307 WRC	13:41.8	(Finland) Marcus Grönholm
Leg 2 (17 Jul)	SS15	Las Bajadas — Villa del Dique	16.42 km	(Finland) Marcus Grönholm	Peugeot 307 WRC	8:47.2	(Finland) Marcus Grönholm
Leg 2 (17 Jul)	SS16	Amboy — Santa Rosa de Calamuchita 2	20.43 km	(Finland) Marcus Grönholm	Peugeot 307 WRC	10:37.2	(Finland) Marcus Grönholm
Leg 2 (17 Jul)	SS17	Carlos Paz — Cabalango 1	14.81 km	(Spain) Carlos Sainz	Citroën Xsara WRC	10:03.5	(Finland) Marcus Grönholm
Leg 2 (17 Jul)	SS18	Tanti — Cosquin 1	9.50 km	(Spain) Carlos Sainz	Citroën Xsara WRC	5:52.4	(Finland) Marcus Grönholm
Leg 2 (17 Jul)	SS19	Cosquin — Villa Allende 1	19.19 km	(Spain) Carlos Sainz	Citroën Xsara WRC	13:33.1	(Spain) Carlos Sainz
Leg 2 (17 Jul)	SS20	Complejo Pro-Racing (Lane A) 3	3.02 km	(Finland) Harri Rovanperä	Peugeot 307 WRC	2:15.3	(Spain) Carlos Sainz
Leg 2 (17 Jul)	SS21	Complejo Pro-Racing (Lane B) 3	3.02 km	(Finland) Harri Rovanperä	Peugeot 307 WRC	2:15.2	(Spain) Carlos Sainz
Leg 3 (18 Jul)	SS22	Carlos Paz — Cabalango 2	14.81 km	(France) Sébastien Loeb	Citroën Xsara WRC	10:08.2	(Spain) Carlos Sainz
Leg 3 (18 Jul)	SS23	Tanti — Cosquin 2	9.50 km	(Finland) Harri Rovanperä	Peugeot 307 WRC	5:52.2	(Spain) Carlos Sainz
Leg 3 (18 Jul)	SS24	Cosquin — Villa Allende 2	19.19 km	(Finland) Mikko Hirvonen	Subaru Impreza S10 WRC '04	13:32.6	(Spain) Carlos Sainz
Leg 3 (18 Jul)	SS25	Mina Clavero — Giulio Cesare	24.69 km	(Finland) Harri Rovanperä	Peugeot 307 WRC	19:49.9	(Spain) Carlos Sainz
Leg 3 (18 Jul)	SS26	El Condor — Copina	16.77 km	(Finland) Harri Rovanperä	Peugeot 307 WRC	14:06.3	(Spain) Carlos Sainz

==== Championship standings ====
Pos.	Drivers' championships			Co-drivers' championships			Manufacturers' championships		
Pos.	Move	Driver	Points	Move	Co-driver	Points	Move	Manufacturer	Points
1		(France) Sébastien Loeb	61		(Monaco) Daniel Elena	61		(France) Citroën Total WRT	98
2		(Norway) Petter Solberg	44		(United Kingdom) Phil Mills	44		(United Kingdom) Ford Motor Co. Ltd.	71
3		(Estonia) Markko Märtin	34		(United Kingdom) Michael Park	34		(Japan) 555 Subaru World Rally Team	64
4	1	(Spain) Carlos Sainz	34	1	(Spain) Marc Martí	34		(France) Marlboro Peugeot Total	51
5	1	(Finland) Marcus Grönholm	32	1	(Finland) Timo Rautiainen	32		(Japan) Mitsubishi Motors	14

=== Production World Rally Championship ===
==== Classification ====
Position		No.	Driver	Co-driver	Entrant	Car	Time	Difference	Points
Event	Class	No.	Driver	Co-driver	Entrant	Car	Time	Difference	Points
10	1	41	(Finland) Jani Paasonen	(Finland) Jani Vainikka	(Austria) OMV World Rally Team	Mitsubishi Lancer Evo VII	4:46:43.5		10
12	2	40	(Austria) Manfred Stohl	(Austria) Ilka Minor	(Austria) OMV World Rally Team	Mitsubishi Lancer Evo VII	4:49:16.3	+2:32.8	8
14	3	44	(Qatar) Nasser Al-Attiyah	(United Kingdom) Chris Patterson	(Qatar) Nasser Al-Attiyah	Subaru Impreza STI	4:57:25.8	+10:42.3	6
16	4	34	(United Kingdom) Niall McShea	(United Kingdom) Gordon Noble	(United Kingdom) Niall McShea	Subaru Impreza STI S10	5:10:54.1	+24:10.6	5
17	5	49	(Spain) Sergio López-Fombona	(Spain) Guifré Pujol	Ralliart Spain	Mitsubishi Lancer Evo VII	5:15:03.9	+28:20.4	4
18	6	38	(Bulgaria) Georgi Geradzhiev Jr.	(Bulgaria) Nikola Popov	(Bulgaria) Racing Team Bulgartabac	Mitsubishi Lancer Evo VIII	5:18:49.2	+32:05.7	3
19	7	45	(Italy) Fabio Frisiero	(Italy) Giovanni Agnese	(Italy) Fabio Frisiero	Subaru Impreza WRX STI	5:21:24.2	+34:40.7	2
Retired SS26		33	(Spain) Daniel Solà	(Spain) Xavier Amigò	(Spain) Daniel Solà	Mitsubishi Lancer Evo VII	Excluded - illegal clutch		0
Retired SS23		43	(Italy) Gianluigi Galli	(Italy) Guido D'Amore	(Italy) Gianluigi Galli	Mitsubishi Lancer Evo VII	Steering		0
Retired SS14		35	(Argentina) Marcos Ligato	(Argentina) Diego Curletto	(Argentina) Marcos Ligato	Subaru Impreza WRX STI	Accident		0
Retired SS13		36	(Mexico) Ricardo Triviño	(Spain) Jordi Barrabés	(Mexico) Triviño Racing	Mitsubishi Lancer Evo VII	Engine		0
Retired SS10		31	(Japan) Toshihiro Arai	(New Zealand) Tony Sircombe	(Japan) Subaru Team Arai	Subaru Impreza WRX STI	Engine		0
Retired SS9		42	(United Kingdom) Mark Higgins	(United Kingdom) Michael Gibson	(United Kingdom) Mark Higgins	Subaru Impreza STI	Accident		0
Retired SS9		48	(Japan) Fumio Nutahara	(Japan) Satoshi Hayashi	(Japan) Advan-Piaa Rally Team	Mitsubishi Lancer Evo VIII	Engine		0
Retired SS8		50	(Germany) Sebastian Vollak	(Germany) Michael Kölbach	(Austria) OMV World Rally Team	Mitsubishi Lancer Evo VI	Suspension		0
Retired SS7		47	(Spain) Xavier Pons	(Spain) Oriol Julià	(Spain) Xavier Pons	Mitsubishi Lancer Evo VIII	Engine		0
Retired SS3		32	(Malaysia) Karamjit Singh	(Malaysia) Allen Oh	Proton Pert Malaysia	Proton Pert	Accident		0

==== Special stages ====
Day	Stage	Stage name	Length	Winner	Car	Time	Class leaders
Leg 1 (15 Jul)	SS1	Complejo Pro-Racing (Lane A) 1	3.02 km	(Finland) Jani Paasonen	Mitsubishi Lancer Evo VII	2:20.7	(Finland) Jani Paasonen
Leg 1 (15 Jul)	SS2	Complejo Pro-Racing (Lane B) 1	3.02 km	(Finland) Jani Paasonen	Mitsubishi Lancer Evo VII	2:22.1	(Finland) Jani Paasonen
Leg 1 (16 Jul)	SS3	La Cumbre — Agua de Oro 1	21.35 km	(Japan) Toshihiro Arai	Subaru Impreza WRX STI	19:46.2	(Finland) Jani Paasonen
Leg 1 (16 Jul)	SS4	Ascochinga — La Cumbre 1	28.83 km	(Argentina) Marcos Ligato	Subaru Impreza WRX STI	20:13.4	(Argentina) Marcos Ligato
Leg 1 (16 Jul)	SS5	Villa Giardino — La Falda 1	16.76 km	(Japan) Toshihiro Arai	Subaru Impreza WRX STI	12:46.0	(Argentina) Marcos Ligato
Leg 1 (16 Jul)	SS6	Valle Hermoso — Casa Grande 1	11:08 km	(Italy) Gianluigi Galli	Mitsubishi Lancer Evo VII	7:50.5	(Finland) Jani Paasonen
Leg 1 (16 Jul)	SS7	La Cumbre — Agua de Oro 2	21.35 km	(Finland) Jani Paasonen	Mitsubishi Lancer Evo VII	19:23.6	(Finland) Jani Paasonen
Leg 1 (16 Jul)	SS8	Ascochinga — La Cumbre 2	22.28 km	(Italy) Gianluigi Galli	Mitsubishi Lancer Evo VII	20:01.4	(Finland) Jani Paasonen
Leg 1 (16 Jul)	SS9	Villa Giardino — La Falde 1	16.76 km	(Spain) Daniel Solà	Mitsubishi Lancer Evo VII	12:47.5	(Argentina) Marcos Ligato
Leg 1 (16 Jul)	SS10	Valle Hermoso — Casa Grande 2	22.28 km	(Italy) Gianluigi Galli	Mitsubishi Lancer Evo VII	7:52.5	(Argentina) Marcos Ligato
Leg 1 (16 Jul)	SS11	Complejo Pro-Racing (Lane A) 2	3.02 km	(Spain) Daniel Solà	Mitsubishi Lancer Evo VII	2:27.6	(Argentina) Marcos Ligato
Leg 1 (16 Jul)	SS12	Complejo Pro-Racing (Lane B) 2	3.02 km	(Italy) Gianluigi Galli	Mitsubishi Lancer Evo VII	2:27.1	(Argentina) Marcos Ligato
Leg 2 (17 Jul)	SS13	Amboy — Santa Rosa de Calamuchita 1	20.43 km	(Spain) Daniel Solà	Mitsubishi Lancer Evo VII	11:31.0	(Argentina) Marcos Ligato
Leg 2 (17 Jul)	SS14	Santa Rosa de Calamuchita — San Agustin	22.57 km	(Spain) Daniel Solà	Mitsubishi Lancer Evo VII	14:41.1	(Spain) Daniel Solà
Leg 2 (17 Jul)	SS15	Las Bajadas — Villa del Dique	16.42 km	(Italy) Gianluigi Galli	Mitsubishi Lancer Evo VII	9:29.4	(Spain) Daniel Solà
Leg 2 (17 Jul)	SS16	Amboy — Santa Rosa de Calamuchita 2	20.43 km	(Italy) Gianluigi Galli	Mitsubishi Lancer Evo VII	11:34.4	(Spain) Daniel Solà
Leg 2 (17 Jul)	SS17	Carlos Paz — Cabalango 1	14.81 km	(Finland) Jani Paasonen	Mitsubishi Lancer Evo VII	10:52.0	(Italy) Gianluigi Galli
Leg 2 (17 Jul)	SS18	Tanti — Cosquin 1	9.50 km	(Spain) Daniel Solà	Mitsubishi Lancer Evo VII	6:16.7	(Spain) Daniel Solà
Leg 2 (17 Jul)	SS19	Cosquin — Villa Allende 1	19.19 km	(Finland) Jani Paasonen	Mitsubishi Lancer Evo VII	14:23.2	(Italy) Gianluigi Galli
Leg 2 (17 Jul)	SS20	Complejo Pro-Racing (Lane A) 3	3.02 km	(Spain) Daniel Solà	Mitsubishi Lancer Evo VII	2:26.5	(Italy) Gianluigi Galli
Leg 2 (17 Jul)	SS21	Complejo Pro-Racing (Lane B) 3	3.02 km	(Finland) Jani Paasonen	Mitsubishi Lancer Evo VII	2:24.9	(Spain) Daniel Solà
Leg 3 (18 Jul)	SS22	Carlos Paz — Cabalango 2	14.81 km	(Spain) Daniel Solà	Mitsubishi Lancer Evo VII	10:55.4	(Spain) Daniel Solà
Leg 3 (18 Jul)	SS23	Tanti — Cosquin 2	9.50 km	(Spain) Daniel Solà	Mitsubishi Lancer Evo VII	6:16.3	(Spain) Daniel Solà
Leg 3 (18 Jul)	SS24	Cosquin — Villa Allende 2	19.19 km	(Finland) Jani Paasonen	Mitsubishi Lancer Evo VII	14:25.2	(Spain) Daniel Solà
Leg 3 (18 Jul)	SS25	Mina Clavero — Giulio Cesare	24.69 km	(Spain) Daniel Solà	Mitsubishi Lancer Evo VII	21:16.4	(Spain) Daniel Solà
Leg 3 (18 Jul)	SS26	El Condor — Copina	16.77 km	(Japan) Fumio Nutahara	Mitsubishi Lancer Evo VIII	15:16.7	(Finland) Jani Paasonen

==== Championship standings ====
Pos.	Drivers' championships		
Pos.	Move	Driver	Points
1	2	(Finland) Jani Paasonen	25
2	3	(Austria) Manfred Stohl	18
3	2	(Spain) Daniel Solà	16
4	2	(Japan) Toshihiro Arai	15
5	1	(United Kingdom) Alister McRae	14
