= 2004 Rally Australia =

16th round of the 2004 World Rally Championship

2004 Rally Australia 17th Telstra Rally Australia
Round 16 of the 2004 World Rally Championship season
← Previous event
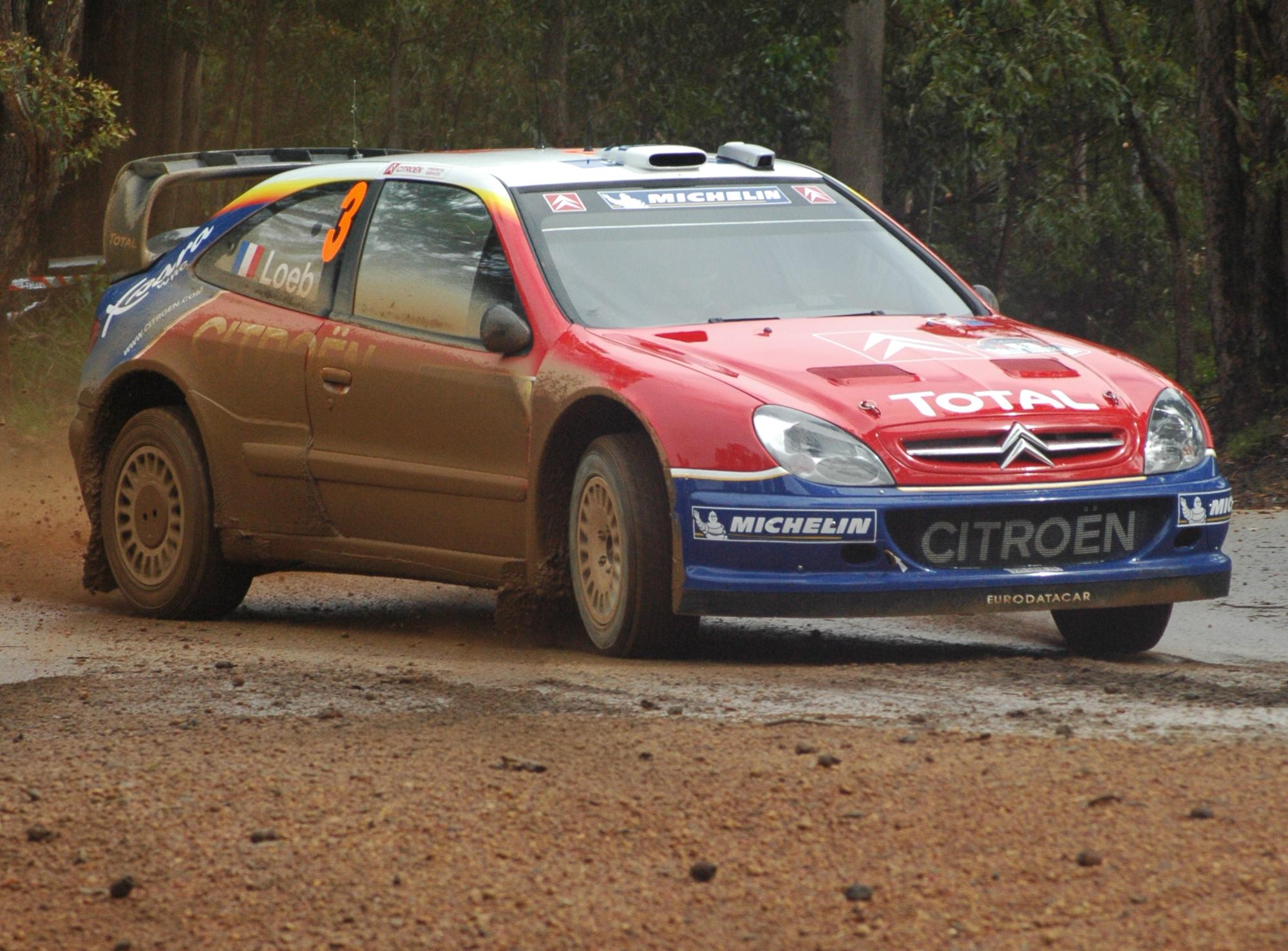
- Sébastien Loeb during one of the special stages.
- Host country: Australia
- Rally base: Perth, Australia
- Dates run: November 11, 2004 – November 14, 2004
- Stages: 25 (388.25 km; 241.25 miles)
- Stage surface: Gravel
- Overall distance: 1,426.48 km (886.37 miles)

Statistics
- Crews: 62 at start, 29 at finish

Overall results
- Overall winner: (France) Sébastien Loeb (Monaco) Daniel Elena (France) Citroën Total

The 2004 Rally Australia (formally the 17th Telstra Rally Australia) was the sixteenth and final round of the 2004 World Rally Championship. The race was held over four days between 11 November and 14 November 2004, and was based in Perth, Australia. Citroën's Sébastien Loeb won the race, his 10th win in the World Rally Championship.

== Background ==
=== Entry list ===
No.	Driver	Co-driver	Entrant	Car	Tyre
World Rally Championship manufacturer entries
1	(Norway) Petter Solberg	(United Kingdom) Phil Mills	(Japan) 555 Subaru World Rally Team	Subaru Impreza S10 WRC '04	P
2	(Finland) Mikko Hirvonen	(Finland) Jarmo Lehtinen	(Japan) 555 Subaru World Rally Team	Subaru Impreza S10 WRC '04	P
3	(France) Sébastien Loeb	(Monaco) Daniel Elena	(France) Citroën Total WRT	Citroën Xsara WRC	MI
4	(Spain) Carlos Sainz (Note: Carlos Sainz did not attend due to injury, suffering from neck pain.)	(Spain) Marc Martí	(France) Citroën Total WRT	Citroën Xsara WRC	MI
5	(Finland) Marcus Grönholm	(Finland) Timo Rautiainen	(France) Marlboro Peugeot Total	Peugeot 307 WRC	MI
6	(Finland) Harri Rovanperä	(Finland) Risto Pietiläinen	(France) Marlboro Peugeot Total	Peugeot 307 WRC	MI
7	(Estonia) Markko Märtin	(United Kingdom) Michael Park	(United Kingdom) Ford Motor Co. Ltd.	Ford Focus RS WRC '04	MI
8	(Belgium) François Duval	(Belgium) Stéphane Prévot	(United Kingdom) Ford Motor Co. Ltd.	Ford Focus RS WRC '04	MI
World Rally Championship entries
11	(Germany) Antony Warmbold	(United Kingdom) Gemma Price	(Germany) Antony Warmbold	Ford Focus RS WRC '02	MI
73	(Australia) Michael Anderson	(Australia) Anthony Chudleigh	(Australia) Michael Anderson	Mitsubishi Lancer Evo VI	—N/a
75	(Australia) Michael Thompson	(Australia) Michael Gentleman	(Australia) Michael Thompson	Subaru Impreza WRX STI	—N/a
81	(Australia) Christopher Anderson	(Australia) Joel Lithgo	(Australia) Christopher Anderson	Mitsubishi Lancer Evo IV	—N/a
90	(Australia) Keith Hedgeland	(Australia) Sally Higgins	(Australia) Keith Hedgeland	Subaru Impreza WRX STI	—N/a
PWRC entries
31	(Japan) Toshihiro Arai	(New Zealand) Tony Sircombe	(Japan) Subaru Team Arai	Subaru Impreza WRX STI	P
32	(Malaysia) Karamjit Singh	(Malaysia) Allen Oh	Proton Pert Malaysia	Proton Pert	P
33	(Spain) Daniel Solà	(Spain) Xavier Amigò	(Spain) Daniel Solà	Mitsubishi Lancer Evo VII	P
34	(United Kingdom) Niall McShea	(United Kingdom) Gordon Noble	(United Kingdom) Niall McShea	Subaru Impreza STI N10	—N/a
35	(Argentina) Marcos Ligato	(Argentina) Rubén García	(Argentina) Marcos Ligato	Subaru Impreza WRX STI	—N/a
38	(Bulgaria) Georgi Geradzhiev Jr.	(Bulgaria) Nikola Popov	(Bulgaria) Racing Team Bulgartabac	Mitsubishi Lancer Evo VIII	—N/a
39	(United Kingdom) Alister McRae	(United Kingdom) David Senior	(United Kingdom) R.E.D World Rally Team	Subaru Impreza WRX STI	P
40	(Austria) Manfred Stohl	(Austria) Ilka Minor	(Austria) OMV World Rally Team	Mitsubishi Lancer Evo VII	P
41	(Finland) Jani Paasonen	(Finland) Jani Vainikka	(Austria) OMV World Rally Team	Mitsubishi Lancer Evo VII	P
42	(United Kingdom) Mark Higgins	(United Kingdom) Daniel Barritt	(United Kingdom) Mark Higgins	Subaru Impreza STI	—N/a
43	(Italy) Gianluigi Galli	(Italy) Guido D'Amore	(Italy) Gianluigi Galli	Mitsubishi Lancer Evo VII	P
44	(Qatar) Nasser Al-Attiyah	(United Kingdom) Chris Patterson	(Qatar) Nasser Al-Attiyah	Subaru Impreza WRX STI	—N/a
45	(Italy) Fabio Frisiero	(Italy) Giovanni Agnese	(Italy) Fabio Frisiero	Subaru Impreza WRX STI	—N/a
47	(Spain) Xavier Pons	(Spain) Oriol Julià	(Spain) Xavier Pons	Mitsubishi Lancer Evo VIII	MI
48	(Japan) Fumio Nutahara	(Japan) Satoshi Hayashi	(Japan) Advan-Piaa Rally Team	Mitsubishi Lancer Evo VIII	Y
50	(Germany) Sebastian Vollak	(Germany) Michael Kölbach	(Austria) OMV World Rally Team	Mitsubishi Lancer Evo VI	P
Other notable entries
61	(Australia) Chris Atkinson	(Australia) Glenn Macneall	Subaru Rally Team Australia	Subaru Impreza WRX STI	—N/a
62	(Australia) Cody Crocker	(Australia) Greg Foletta	Subaru Rally Team Australia	Subaru Impreza WRX STI	—N/a

=== Itinerary ===
All dates and times are AWST (UTC+8).

Date	Time	No.	Stage name	Distance
Leg 1 — 133.27 km
11 November	18:38	SS1	Perth City Super 1	2.35 km
12 November	09:31	SS2	Stirling West	15.89 km
12 November	10:04	SS3	Stirling Long	34.99 km
12 November	11:37	SS4	Murray North	15.92 km
12 November	12:07	SS5	Murray South	19.08 km
12 November	16:03	SS6	Beraking 1	23.03 km
12 November	16:46	SS7	Helena South 1	17.31 km
12 November	19:45	SS8	Perth City Super 2	2.35 km
12 November	19:54	SS9	Perth City Super 3	2.35 km
Leg 2 — 127.15 km
13 November	09:46	SS10	Beraking 2	23.03 km
13 November	10:29	SS11	Helena East 1	22.29 km
13 November	11:04	SS12	Atkins 1	4.42 km
13 November	11:43	SS13	Helena West 1	15.44 km
13 November	12:11	SS14	Helena South 2	17.31 km
13 November	15:34	SS15	Flynns 1	20.10 km
13 November	16:13	SS16	Helena West 2	15.44 km
13 November	16:48	SS17	Atkins 2	4.42 km
13 November	19:45	SS18	Perth City Super 4	2.35 km
13 November	19:54	SS19	Perth City Super 5	2.35 km
Leg 3 — 127.83 km
14 November	07:00	SS20	Flynns 2	20.10 km
14 November	07:33	SS21	Helena East 2	22.29 km
14 November	11:01	SS22	Bannister North Short	13.86 km
14 November	11:29	SS23	Bannister Central 1	17.97 km
14 November	12:42	SS24	Bannister North Long	35.64 km
14 November	13:30	SS25	Bannister Central 2	17.97 km

== Results ==
=== Overall ===
Pos.	No.	Driver	Co-driver	Team	Car	Time	Difference	Points
1	3	(France) Sébastien Loeb	(Monaco) Daniel Elena	(France) Citroën Total WRT	Citroën Xsara WRC	3:39:46.8		10
2	6	(Finland) Harri Rovanperä	(Finland) Risto Pietiläinen	(France) Marlboro Peugeot Total	Peugeot 307 WRC	3:41:41.9	+1:55.1	8
3	8	(Belgium) François Duval	(Belgium) Stéphane Prévot	(United Kingdom) Ford Motor Co. Ltd.	Ford Focus RS WRC '04	3:43:27.0	+3:40.2	6
4	2	(Finland) Mikko Hirvonen	(Finland) Jarmo Lehtinen	(Japan) 555 Subaru World Rally Team	Subaru Impreza S10 WRC '04	3:45:47.2	+6:00.4	5
5	61	(Australia) Chris Atkinson	(Australia) Glenn Macneall	Subaru Rally Team Australia	Subaru Impreza WRX STI	3:56:42.4	+16:55.6	4
6	47	(Spain) Xavier Pons	(Spain) Oriol Julià	(Spain) Xavier Pons	Mitsubishi Lancer Evo VIII	3:57:22.9	+17:36.1	3
7	62	(Australia) Cody Crocker	(Australia) Greg Foletta	Subaru Rally Team Australia	Subaru Impreza WRX STI	3:57:30.1	+17:43.3	2
8	31	(Japan) Toshihiro Arai	(New Zealand) Tony Sircombe	(Japan) Subaru Team Arai	Subaru Impreza WRX STI	3:59:19.1	+19:32.3	1

=== World Rally Cars ===
==== Classification ====
Position		No.	Driver	Co-driver	Entrant	Car	Time	Difference	Points
Event	Class	No.	Driver	Co-driver	Entrant	Car	Time	Difference	Points
1	1	3	(France) Sébastien Loeb	(Monaco) Daniel Elena	(France) Citroën Total WRT	Citroën Xsara WRC	3:39:46.8		10
2	2	6	(Finland) Harri Rovanperä	(Finland) Risto Pietiläinen	(France) Marlboro Peugeot Total	Peugeot 307 WRC	3:41:41.9	+1:55.1	8
3	3	8	(Belgium) François Duval	(Belgium) Stéphane Prévot	(United Kingdom) Ford Motor Co. Ltd.	Ford Focus RS WRC '04	3:43:27.0	+3:40.2	6
4	4	2	(Finland) Mikko Hirvonen	(Finland) Jarmo Lehtinen	(Japan) 555 Subaru World Rally Team	Subaru Impreza S10 WRC '04	3:45:47.2	+6:00.4	5
Retired SS10		5	(Finland) Marcus Grönholm	(Finland) Timo Rautiainen	(France) Marlboro Peugeot Total	Peugeot 307 WRC	Accident		0
Retired SS4		1	(Norway) Petter Solberg	(United Kingdom) Phil Mills	(Japan) 555 Subaru World Rally Team	Subaru Impreza S10 WRC '04	Accident		0
Retired SS2		7	(Estonia) Markko Märtin	(United Kingdom) Michael Park	(United Kingdom) Ford Motor Co. Ltd.	Ford Focus RS WRC '04	Engine		0
WD		4	(Spain) Carlos Sainz	(Spain) Marc Martí	(France) Citroën Total WRT	Citroën Xsara WRC	Withdrew		0

==== Special stages ====
Day	Stage	Stage name	Length	Winner	Car	Time	Class leaders
Leg 1 (11 Nov)	SS1	Perth City Super 1	2.35 km	(Finland) Marcus Grönholm	Peugeot 307 WRC	1:32.9	(Finland) Marcus Grönholm
Leg 1 (12 Nov)	SS2	Stirling West	15.89 km	(Finland) Marcus Grönholm	Peugeot 307 WRC	9:14.5	(Finland) Marcus Grönholm
Leg 1 (12 Nov)	SS3	Stirling Long	34.99 km	(Finland) Marcus Grönholm	Peugeot 307 WRC	19:51.2	(Finland) Marcus Grönholm
Leg 1 (12 Nov)	SS4	Murray North	15.92 km	(France) Sébastien Loeb	Citroën Xsara WRC	8:56.9	(Finland) Marcus Grönholm
Leg 1 (12 Nov)	SS5	Murray South	19.08 km	(France) Sébastien Loeb	Citroën Xsara WRC	10:48.2	(Finland) Marcus Grönholm
Leg 1 (12 Nov)	SS6	Beraking 1	23.03 km	(Finland) Marcus Grönholm	Peugeot 307 WRC	13:03.5	(Finland) Marcus Grönholm
Leg 1 (12 Nov)	SS7	Helena South 1	17.31 km	(Finland) Marcus Grönholm	Peugeot 307 WRC	9:06.4	(Finland) Marcus Grönholm
Leg 1 (12 Nov)	SS8	Perth City Super 2	2.35 km	(Norway) Petter Solberg	Subaru Impreza S10 WRC '04	1:32.9	(Finland) Marcus Grönholm
Leg 1 (12 Nov)	SS9	Perth City Super 3	2.35 km	(Norway) Petter Solberg	Subaru Impreza S10 WRC '04	1:32.4	(Finland) Marcus Grönholm
Leg 2 (13 Nov)	SS10	Beraking 2	23.03 km	(France) Sébastien Loeb	Citroën Xsara WRC	12:40.9	(France) Sébastien Loeb
Leg 2 (13 Nov)	SS11	Helena East 1	22.29 km	(Norway) Petter Solberg	Subaru Impreza S10 WRC '04	13:17.2	(France) Sébastien Loeb
Leg 2 (13 Nov)	SS12	Atkins 1	4.42 km	(Norway) Petter Solberg	Subaru Impreza S10 WRC '04	3:03.1	(France) Sébastien Loeb
Leg 2 (13 Nov)	SS13	Helena West 1	15.44 km	(Norway) Petter Solberg	Subaru Impreza S10 WRC '04	8:52.2	(France) Sébastien Loeb
Leg 2 (13 Nov)	SS14	Helena South 2	17.31 km	(France) Sébastien Loeb	Citroën Xsara WRC	8:59.0	(France) Sébastien Loeb
Leg 2 (13 Nov)	SS15	Flynns 1	20.10 km	(France) Sébastien Loeb	Citroën Xsara WRC	11:59.8	(France) Sébastien Loeb
Leg 2 (13 Nov)	SS16	Helena West 2	15.44 km	(Norway) Petter Solberg	Subaru Impreza S10 WRC '04	8:37.0	(France) Sébastien Loeb
Leg 2 (13 Nov)	SS17	Atkins 2	4.42 km	(France) Sébastien Loeb	Citroën Xsara WRC	3:01.2	(France) Sébastien Loeb
Leg 2 (13 Nov)	SS18	Perth City Super 4	2.35 km	(Finland) Harri Rovanperä	Peugeot 307 WRC	1:33.1	(France) Sébastien Loeb
Leg 2 (13 Nov)	SS19	Perth City Super 5	2.35 km	(Finland) Harri Rovanperä	Peugeot 307 WRC	1:33.2	(France) Sébastien Loeb
Leg 3 (14 Nov)	SS20	Flynns 2	20.10 km	(France) Sébastien Loeb	Citroën Xsara WRC	11:37.5	(France) Sébastien Loeb
Leg 3 (14 Nov)	SS21	Helena East 2	22.29 km	(France) Sébastien Loeb	Citroën Xsara WRC	12:48.5	(France) Sébastien Loeb
Leg 3 (14 Nov)	SS22	Bannister North Short	13.86 km	(Norway) Petter Solberg	Subaru Impreza S10 WRC '04	7:15.7	(France) Sébastien Loeb
Leg 3 (14 Nov)	SS23	Bannister Central 1	17.97 km	(Norway) Petter Solberg	Subaru Impreza S10 WRC '04	9:20.3	(France) Sébastien Loeb
Leg 3 (14 Nov)	SS24	Bannister North Long	35.64 km	(Norway) Petter Solberg	Subaru Impreza S10 WRC '04	18:39.6	(France) Sébastien Loeb
Leg 3 (14 Nov)	SS25	Bannister Central 2	17.97 km	(Norway) Petter Solberg	Subaru Impreza S10 WRC '04	9:12.7	(France) Sébastien Loeb

==== Championship standings ====
- **Bold text** indicates 2004 World Champions.

Pos.	Drivers' championships			Co-drivers' championships			Manufacturers' championships		
Pos.	Move	Driver	Points	Move	Co-driver	Points	Move	Manufacturer	Points
1		(France) **Sébastien Loeb**	118		(Monaco) **Daniel Elena**	118		(France) **Citroën Total WRT**	194
2		(Norway) Petter Solberg	82		(United Kingdom) Phil Mills	82		(United Kingdom) Ford Motor Co. Ltd.	143
3		(Estonia) Markko Märtin	79		(United Kingdom) Michael Park	79		(Japan) 555 Subaru World Rally Team	122
4		(Spain) Carlos Sainz	73		(Spain) Marc Martí	73		(France) Marlboro Peugeot Total	101
5		(Finland) Marcus Grönholm	62		(Finland) Timo Rautiainen	62		(Japan) Mitsubishi Motors	17

=== Production World Rally Championship ===
==== Classification ====
Position		No.	Driver	Co-driver	Entrant	Car	Time	Difference	Points
Event	Class	No.	Driver	Co-driver	Entrant	Car	Time	Difference	Points
6	1	47	(Spain) Xavier Pons	(Spain) Oriol Julià	(Spain) Xavier Pons	Mitsubishi Lancer Evo VIII	3:57:22.9		10
8	2	31	(Japan) Toshihiro Arai	(New Zealand) Tony Sircombe	(Japan) Subaru Team Arai	Subaru Impreza WRX STI	3:59:19.1	+1:56.2	8
9	3	34	(United Kingdom) Niall McShea	(United Kingdom) Gordon Noble	(United Kingdom) Niall McShea	Subaru Impreza STI N10	3:59:42.5	+2:19.6	6
12	4	48	(Japan) Fumio Nutahara	(Japan) Satoshi Hayashi	(Japan) Advan-Piaa Rally Team	Mitsubishi Lancer Evo VIII	4:06:17.8	+8:54.9	5
13	5	44	(Qatar) Nasser Al-Attiyah	(United Kingdom) Chris Patterson	(Qatar) Nasser Al-Attiyah	Subaru Impreza WRX STI	4:09:49.3	+12:26.4	4
16	6	50	(Germany) Sebastian Vollak	(Germany) Michael Kölbach	(Austria) OMV World Rally Team	Mitsubishi Lancer Evo VI	4:16:37.2	+19:14.3	3
19	7	45	(Italy) Fabio Frisiero	(Italy) Giovanni Agnese	(Italy) Fabio Frisiero	Subaru Impreza WRX STI	4:22:17.0	+24:54.1	2
Retired SS22		39	(United Kingdom) Alister McRae	(United Kingdom) David Senior	(United Kingdom) R.E.D World Rally Team	Subaru Impreza WRX STI	Differential		0
Retired SS15		42	(United Kingdom) Mark Higgins	(United Kingdom) Daniel Barritt	(United Kingdom) Mark Higgins	Subaru Impreza STI	Engine		0
Retired SS13		32	(Malaysia) Karamjit Singh	(Malaysia) Allen Oh	Proton Pert Malaysia	Proton Pert	Suspension		0
Retired SS11		41	(Finland) Jani Paasonen	(Finland) Jani Vainikka	(Austria) OMV World Rally Team	Mitsubishi Lancer Evo VII	Excluded		0
Retired SS7		43	(Italy) Gianluigi Galli	(Italy) Guido D'Amore	(Italy) Gianluigi Galli	Mitsubishi Lancer Evo VII	Accident		0
Retired SS6		33	(Spain) Daniel Solà	(Spain) Xavier Amigò	(Spain) Daniel Solà	Mitsubishi Lancer Evo VII	Engine		0
Retired SS5		38	(Bulgaria) Georgi Geradzhiev Jr.	(Bulgaria) Nikola Popov	(Bulgaria) Racing Team Bulgartabac	Mitsubishi Lancer Evo VIII	Accident		0
Retired SS4		40	(Austria) Manfred Stohl	(Austria) Ilka Minor	(Austria) OMV World Rally Team	Mitsubishi Lancer Evo VII	Accident		0
Retired SS2		35	(Argentina) Marcos Ligato	(Argentina) Rubén García	(Argentina) Marcos Ligato	Subaru Impreza WRX STI	Engine		0

==== Special stages ====
Day	Stage	Stage name	Length	Winner	Car	Time	Class leaders
Leg 1 (11 Nov)	SS1	Perth City Super 1	2.35 km	(Japan) Fumio Nutahara	Mitsubishi Lancer Evo VIII	1:38.2	(Japan) Fumio Nutahara
Leg 1 (12 Nov)	SS2	Stirling West	15.89 km	(Japan) Toshihiro Arai	Subaru Impreza WRX STI	10:02.6	(Japan) Toshihiro Arai
Leg 1 (12 Nov)	SS3	Stirling Long	34.99 km	(United Kingdom) Alister McRae	Subaru Impreza WRX STI	21:30.8	(United Kingdom) Alister McRae
Leg 1 (12 Nov)	SS4	Murray North	15.92 km	(Italy) Gianluigi Galli	Mitsubishi Lancer Evo VII	9:44.3	(United Kingdom) Alister McRae
Leg 1 (12 Nov)	SS5	Murray South	19.08 km	(Spain) Xavier Pons	Mitsubishi Lancer Evo VIII	11:35.9	(United Kingdom) Alister McRae
Leg 1 (12 Nov)	SS6	Beraking 1	23.03 km	(United Kingdom) Alister McRae	Subaru Impreza WRX STI	14:05.4	(United Kingdom) Alister McRae
Leg 1 (12 Nov)	SS7	Helena South 1	17.31 km	(Japan) Toshihiro Arai	Subaru Impreza WRX STI	9:45.5	(United Kingdom) Alister McRae
Leg 1 (12 Nov)	SS8	Perth City Super 2	2.35 km	(Japan) Fumio Nutahara	Mitsubishi Lancer Evo VIII	1:38.5	(United Kingdom) Alister McRae
Leg 1 (12 Nov)	SS9	Perth City Super 3	2.35 km	(Japan) Fumio Nutahara	Mitsubishi Lancer Evo VIII	1:37.6	(United Kingdom) Alister McRae
Leg 2 (13 Nov)	SS10	Beraking 2	23.03 km	(Spain) Xavier Pons	Mitsubishi Lancer Evo VIII	13:48.4	(United Kingdom) Alister McRae
Leg 2 (13 Nov)	SS11	Helena East 1	22.29 km	(Spain) Xavier Pons	Mitsubishi Lancer Evo VIII	14:01.8	(United Kingdom) Alister McRae
Leg 2 (13 Nov)	SS12	Atkins 1	4.42 km	(Japan) Toshihiro Arai	Subaru Impreza WRX STI	3:14.4	(United Kingdom) Alister McRae
Leg 2 (13 Nov)	SS13	Helena West 1	15.44 km	(Japan) Toshihiro Arai	Subaru Impreza WRX STI	9:30.5	(United Kingdom) Alister McRae
Leg 2 (13 Nov)	SS14	Helena South 2	17.31 km	(Japan) Toshihiro Arai	Subaru Impreza WRX STI	9:39.5	(United Kingdom) Alister McRae
Leg 2 (13 Nov)	SS15	Flynns 1	20.10 km	(Japan) Toshihiro Arai	Subaru Impreza WRX STI	12:47.5	(United Kingdom) Alister McRae
Leg 2 (13 Nov)	SS16	Helena West 2	15.44 km	(Spain) Xavier Pons	Mitsubishi Lancer Evo VIII	9:21.1	(United Kingdom) Alister McRae
Leg 2 (13 Nov)	SS17	Atkins 2	4.42 km	(Spain) Xavier Pons	Mitsubishi Lancer Evo VIII	3:10.3	(United Kingdom) Alister McRae
Leg 2 (13 Nov)	SS18	Perth City Super 4	2.35 km	(Austria) Manfred Stohl (Japan) Fumio Nutahara	Mitsubishi Lancer Evo VII; Mitsubishi Lancer Evo VIII	1:39.0	(United Kingdom) Alister McRae
Leg 2 (13 Nov)	SS19	Perth City Super 5	2.35 km	(Finland) Jani Paasonen (Japan) Fumio Nutahara	Mitsubishi Lancer Evo VII; Mitsubishi Lancer Evo VIII	1:38.1	(United Kingdom) Alister McRae
Leg 3 (14 Nov)	SS20	Flynns 2	20.10 km	(Spain) Xavier Pons	Mitsubishi Lancer Evo VIII	12:28.5	(United Kingdom) Alister McRae
Leg 3 (14 Nov)	SS21	Helena East 2	22.29 km	(Spain) Xavier Pons	Mitsubishi Lancer Evo VIII	13:44.3	(United Kingdom) Alister McRae
Leg 3 (14 Nov)	SS22	Bannister North Short	13.86 km	(Japan) Toshihiro Arai	Subaru Impreza WRX STI	7:54.0	(Spain) Xavier Pons
Leg 3 (14 Nov)	SS23	Bannister Central 1	17.97 km	(Spain) Xavier Pons	Mitsubishi Lancer Evo VIII	10:14.7	(Spain) Xavier Pons
Leg 3 (14 Nov)	SS24	Bannister North Long	35.64 km	(Japan) Toshihiro Arai	Subaru Impreza WRX STI	20:29.1	(Spain) Xavier Pons
Leg 3 (14 Nov)	SS25	Bannister Central 2	17.97 km	(Japan) Toshihiro Arai	Subaru Impreza WRX STI	10:02.3	(Spain) Xavier Pons

==== Championship standings ====
- **Bold text** indicates 2004 World Champions.

Pos.	Drivers' championships		
Pos.	Move	Driver	Points
1	2	(United Kingdom) **Niall McShea**	35
2	3	(Japan) Toshihiro Arai	30
3	2	(Finland) Jani Paasonen	29
4	2	(Spain) Xavier Pons	27
5	1	(United Kingdom) Alister McRae	26
