= Peugeot 307 WRC =

Peugeot World Rally Car

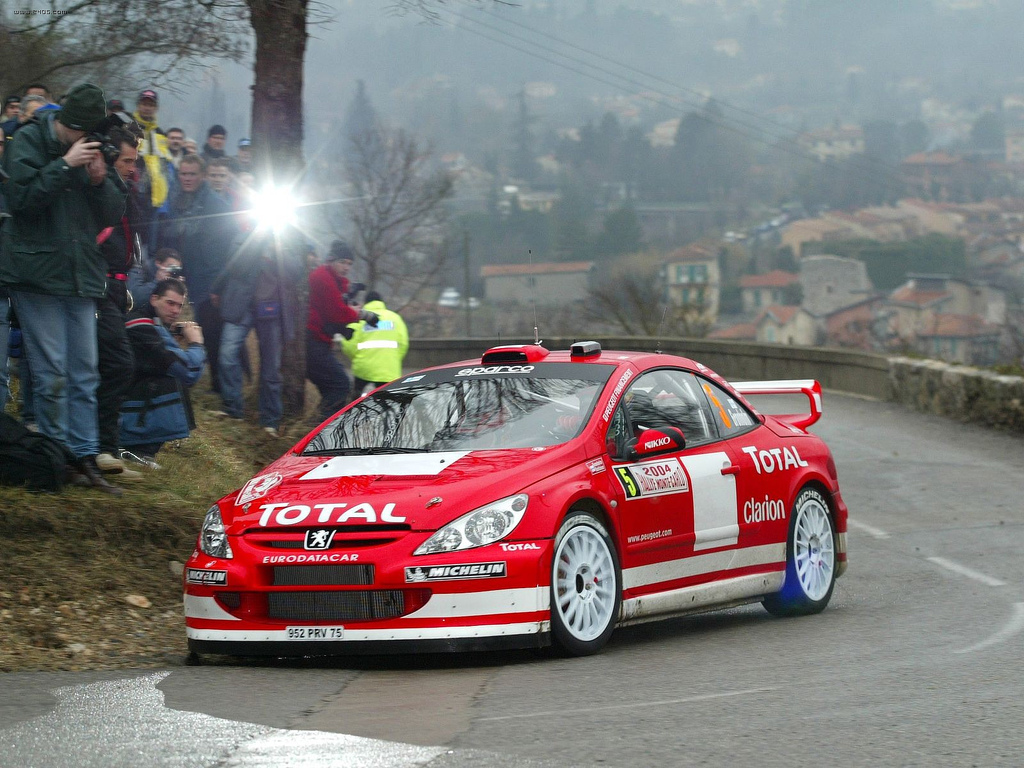
- Category: World Rally Car
- Constructor: Peugeot Sport
- Designer: Julien Loisy
- Predecessor: Peugeot 206 WRC

Technical specifications
- Length: 4,344 mm (171.0 in)
- Width: 1,770 mm (69.7 in)
- Height: 1,370 mm (53.9 in)
- Wheelbase: 2,610 mm (102.8 in)
- Engine: PSA XU7JP4 2.0 L (122 cu in) I4 turbocharged front-engine, all-wheel-drive
- Transmission: Four-speed sequential Five-speed sequential 4-wheel drive
- Weight: 1,230 kg (2,711.7 lb)
- Lubricants: Total
- Tyres: Michelin; Pirelli

Competition history (WRC)
- Notable entrants: (France) Peugeot Sport; OMV Peugeot Norway
- Notable drivers: (France) Nicolas Bernardi; (Sweden) Daniel Carlsson; (Italy) Gigi Galli; (Finland) Marcus Grönholm; (Finland) Sebastian Lindholm; (Belgium) Freddy Loix; (Estonia) Markko Märtin; (Finland) Harri Rovanperä; (Norway) Henning Solberg; (Austria) Manfred Stohl
- Debut: (Monaco) 2004 Monte Carlo Rally
- First win: 2004 Rally Finland
- Last win: 2005 Rally Japan
| Races | Wins | Podiums | Titles |
|---|---|---|---|
| 36 | 3 | 26 | 0 |

The Peugeot 307 WRC is a World Rally Car based on the Peugeot 307 road car. It was used by Peugeot Sport, Peugeot's factory team, and replaced the championship-winning 206 WRC from 2004 to 2005 in the World Rally Championship.

== Competition history ==
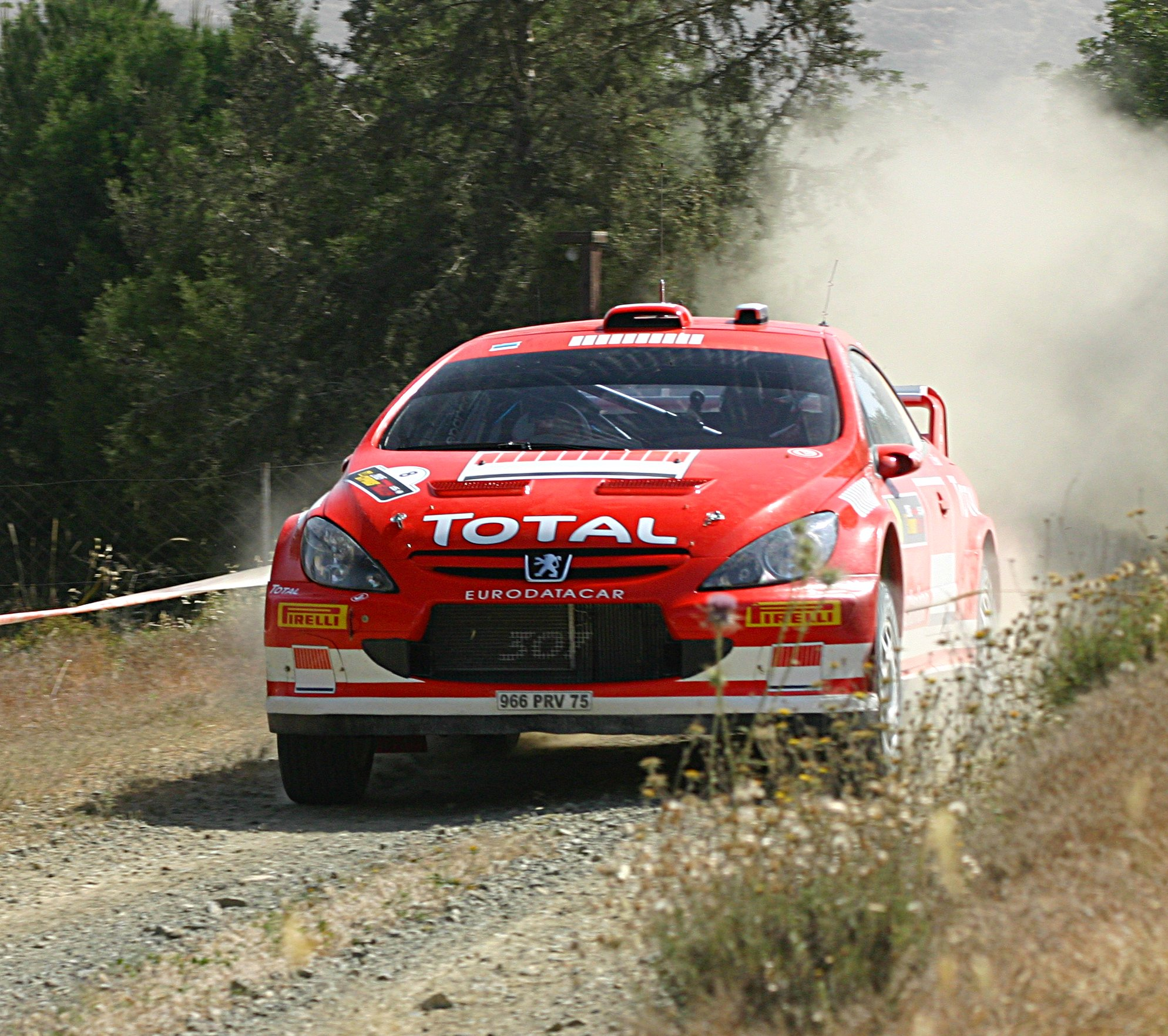
Markko Märtin driving his 307 WRC at the 2005 Cyprus Rally.

The vehicle was plagued by transmission problems throughout its career, and the works team's drivers' driving styles did not suit the car's handling characteristics. In 2004, the car took seven podiums and a maiden win in Rally Finland, but it was not able to challenge for the championship as Marcus Grönholm finished fifth in the drivers' championship and Peugeot fourth in the manufacturers' championship.

The 2005 season was more successful, and Peugeot was a serious challenger for the manufacturers' championship, leading the championship after round 10, but the challenge faded after Markko Märtin's retirement from rallying following the death of Martin's co-driver Michael Park during the 2005 Wales Rally of Great Britain. Peugeot ultimately finished second in the manufacturers' championship, while Grönholm finished third in the drivers' championship, tied on points with second-placed Petter Solberg. Grönholm took victories at Rally Finland and Rally Japan along with six other podium finishes, while Märtin took four further podiums.

The car saw its factory supported competition life cut short at the end of 2005 by PSA's decision to withdraw the factory teams of both Citroën and Peugeot from top level rallying. A private undertaking by seasoned Peugeot preparatory firm Bozian Racing, dubbed OMV Peugeot Norway World Rally Team, largely assumed responsibility for the running of WRC specification 307s for the following season of 2006. Manfred Stohl and Henning Solberg were named as the driving personnel. Stohl impressively placed fourth in the overall drivers' standings, and the 307 WRC took seven podiums by privateer teams that season.

Overall, the car has three WRC victories and 26 podiums to its name, Marcus Grönholm having driven it to the top of the podium in the series at the Rally Finland in 2004 and 2005 as well as at the Rally Japan in 2005.

The 307 WRC will be remembered for the accident that befell WRC competitors Markko Märtin and Michael Park on September 18, 2005, which resulted in co-driver Park's death. On stage 15 of Wales Rally GB, Märtin lost control of his 307 WRC and collided with a tree, killing Park instantly. This was the first fatality in a WRC event since Rodger Freeth in 1993.

== WRC victories ==
| No. | Event | Season | Driver | Co-driver |
|---|---|---|---|---|
| 1 | 2004 Rally Finland | 2004 | (Finland) Marcus Grönholm | (Finland) Timo Rautiainen |
| 2 | 2005 Rally Finland | 2005 | (Finland) Marcus Grönholm | (Finland) Timo Rautiainen |
| 3 | 2005 Rally Japan | 2005 | (Finland) Marcus Grönholm | (Finland) Timo Rautiainen |

== WRC results ==
| Year | Entrant | Driver | 1 | 2 | 3 | 4 | 5 | 6 | 7 | 8 | 9 | 10 | 11 | 12 | 13 | 14 | 15 | 16 | TC | Points |
|---|---|---|---|---|---|---|---|---|---|---|---|---|---|---|---|---|---|---|---|---|
| 2004 | Peugeot Sport | (Finland) Marcus Grönholm | MON; 4 | SWE; 2 | MEX; 6 | NZL; 2 | CYP; DSQ | GRC; Ret | TUR; 2 | ARG; Ret | FIN; 1 | GER; Ret | JPN; 4 | GBR; Ret | ITA; 7 | FRA; 4 | ESP; 2 | AUS; Ret | 4th | 101 |
| 2004 | Peugeot Sport | (Belgium) Freddy Loix | MON; 5 | SWE; Ret | | | | | | | | | | | | | ESP; Ret | | 4th | 101 |
| 2004 | Peugeot Sport | (Finland) Harri Rovanperä | | | MEX; 10 | NZL; 5 | CYP; DSQ | GRC; 3 | TUR; Ret | ARG; 5 | FIN; Ret | | JPN; 6 | GBR; 6 | ITA; Ret | | | AUS; 2 | 4th | 101 |
| 2004 | Peugeot Sport | (France) Cédric Robert | | | | | | | | | | GER; 5 | | | | FRA; Ret | | | 4th | 101 |
| 2004 | Peugeot Sport | (Belgium) Freddy Loix | | | MEX | NZL | CYP | GRC | TUR | ARG | FIN | GER; 6 | JPN | GBR | ITA | FRA; 7 | | AUS | 4th | 101 |
| 2004 | Peugeot Sport | (Finland) Sebastian Lindholm | MON | SWE | MEX | NZL | CYP | GRC | TUR | ARG | FIN; Ret | GER | JPN | GBR | ITA | FRA | ESP | AUS | 4th | 101 |
| 2004 | Peugeot Sport | (Sweden) Daniel Carlsson | MON | SWE | MEX | NZL | CYP | GRC | TUR | ARG | FIN | GER | JPN | GBR; Ret | ITA | FRA | ESP | AUS | 4th | 101 |
| 2005 | Peugeot Sport | (Finland) Marcus Grönholm | MON; 5 | SWE; Ret | MEX; 2 | NZL; 2 | ITA; 3 | CYP; Ret | TUR; 3 | GRC; 4 | ARG; 2 | FIN; 1 | GER; 3 | GBR; Ret | JPN; 1 | FRA; Ret | ESP; Ret | AUS; Ret | 2nd | 135 |
| 2005 | Peugeot Sport | (Estonia) Markko Märtin | MON; 4 | SWE; 2 | MEX; 3 | NZL; 5 | ITA; 4 | CYP; 3 | TUR; 5 | GRC; 8 | ARG; 6 | FIN; 3 | GER; 4 | GBR; Ret | | | | | 2nd | 135 |
| 2005 | Peugeot Sport | (Sweden) Daniel Carlsson | | | | | | | | | | | | | JAP; 8 | | | AUS; Ret | 2nd | 135 |
| 2005 | Peugeot Sport | (France) Nicolas Bernardi | | | | | | | | | | | | | | FRA; 8 | ESP; 6 | | 2nd | 135 |
| 2005 | Peugeot Sport | (Sweden) Daniel Carlsson | MON | SWE; 6 | MEX | NZL | ITA | CYP | TUR | GRC | ARG | FIN | GER | GBR | | FRA | ESP | | 2nd | 135 |
| 2005 | Peugeot Sport | (Finland) Sebastian Lindholm | MON | SWE | MEX | NZL | ITA | CYP | TUR | GRC | ARG | FIN; Ret | GER | GBR | JAP | FRA | ESP | AUS | 2nd | 135 |
