= 2004 Cyprus Rally =

Rallying motorsport event

2004 Cyprus Rally 32nd Cyprus Rally
Round 5 of the 2004 World Rally Championship season
← Previous event	Next event →
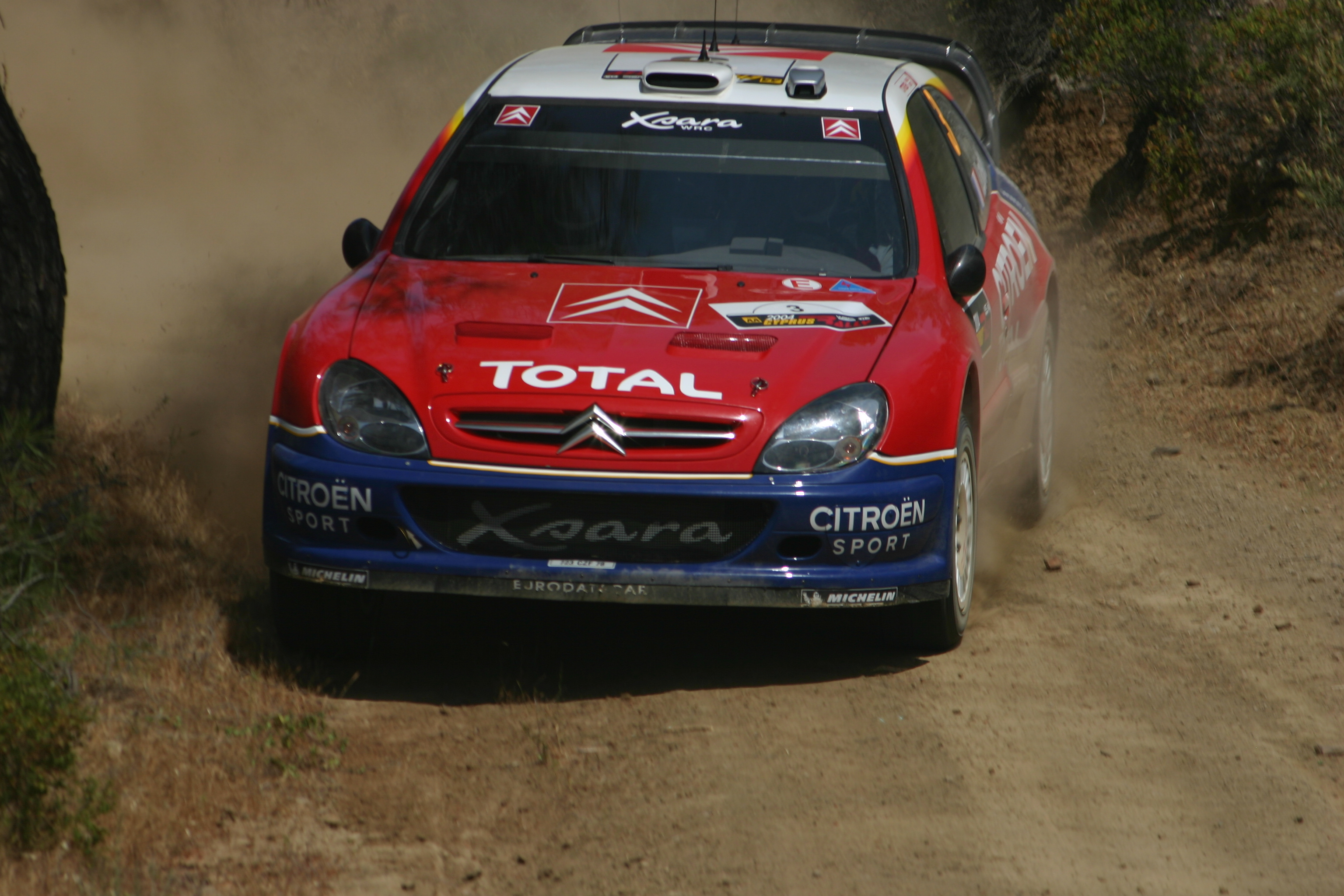
- Rally winner Sébastien Loeb.
- Host country: Cyprus
- Rally base: Limassol
- Dates run: May 14, 2004 – May 16, 2004
- Stages: 18 (326.68 km; 202.99 miles)
- Stage surface: Gravel
- Overall distance: 1,116.09 km (693.51 miles)

Statistics
- Crews: 37 at start, 19 at finish

Overall results
- Overall winner: (France) Sébastien Loeb (Monaco) Daniel Elena (France) Citroën Total; Citroën Xsara WRC

The 2004 Cyprus Rally (formally the 32nd Cyprus Rally) was the fifth round of the 2004 World Rally Championship. The race was held over three days between 14 May and 16 May 2004, and was based in Limassol, Cyprus. Citroën's Sébastien Loeb won the race, his 7th win in the World Rally Championship.

== Background ==
=== Entry list ===
No.	Driver	Co-Driver	Entrant	Car	Tyre
World Rally Championship manufacturer entries
1	(Norway) Petter Solberg	(United Kingdom) Phil Mills	(Japan) 555 Subaru World Rally Team	Subaru Impreza S10 WRC '04	P
2	(Finland) Mikko Hirvonen	(Finland) Jarmo Lehtinen	(Japan) 555 Subaru World Rally Team	Subaru Impreza S10 WRC '04	P
3	(France) Sébastien Loeb	(Monaco) Daniel Elena	(France) Citroën Total WRT	Citroën Xsara WRC	M
4	(Spain) Carlos Sainz	(Spain) Marc Martí	(France) Citroën Total WRT	Citroën Xsara WRC	M
5	(Finland) Marcus Grönholm	(Finland) Timo Rautiainen	(France) Marlboro Peugeot Total	Peugeot 307 WRC	M
6	(Finland) Harri Rovanperä	(Finland) Risto Pietiläinen	(France) Marlboro Peugeot Total	Peugeot 307 WRC	M
7	(Estonia) Markko Märtin	(United Kingdom) Michael Park	(United Kingdom) Ford Motor Co. Ltd.	Ford Focus RS WRC '04	M
8	(Belgium) François Duval	(Belgium) Stéphane Prévot	(United Kingdom) Ford Motor Co. Ltd.	Ford Focus RS WRC '04	M
9	(France) Gilles Panizzi	(France) Hervé Panizzi	(Japan) Mitsubishi Motors	Mitsubishi Lancer WRC 04	M
10	(Finland) Kristian Sohlberg	(Finland) Kaj Lindström	(Japan) Mitsubishi Motors	Mitsubishi Lancer WRC 04	M
World Rally Championship entries
11	(Finland) Janne Tuohino	(Finland) Jukka Aho	(Finland) Supset	Ford Focus RS WRC '02	M
12	(Norway) Henning Solberg	(Norway) Cato Menkerud	(France) Bozian Racing	Peugeot 206 WRC	M
14	(Finland) Jussi Välimäki	(Finland) Jakke Honkanen	Hyundai Motorsport Finland	Hyundai Accent WRC3	M
15	(United Kingdom) Alistair Ginley	(Republic of Ireland) Rory Kennedy	(United Kingdom) Alistair Ginley	Subaru Impreza S9 WRC '03	P
16	(Portugal) Miguel Campos	(Portugal) Nuno Rodrigues da Silva	(France) Bozian Racing	Peugeot 206 WRC	M
17	(Germany) Antony Warmbold	(United Kingdom) Gemma Price	(United Kingdom) M-Sport	Ford Focus RS WRC '02	M
18	(Greece) Ioannis Papadimitriou	(United Kingdom) Allan Harryman	(Greece) Ioannis Papadimitriou	Ford Focus RS WRC '01	M
61	(Argentina) Luís Pérez Companc	(Argentina) Jose Maria Volta	(France) Bozian Racing	Peugeot 206 WRC	M
64	(Cyprus) Andreas Tsouloftas	(Cyprus) Savvas Laos	(Cyprus) Andreas Tsouloftas	Mitsubishi Lancer Evo VI	—N/a
83	(Cyprus) Georgios Zakos	(Cyprus) Kyriacos Evangelou	(Cyprus) Georgios Zakos	Subaru Impreza 555	—N/a

=== Itinerary ===
All dates and times are EEST (UTC+3).

Date	Time	No.	Stage name	Distance
Leg 1 — 121.78 km
14 May	08:23	SS1	Lagoudera — Spilia 1	38.32 km
14 May	09:46	SS2	Kourdali — Asinou 1	15.00 km
14 May	10:13	SS3	Asinou — Agios Theodoros 1	7.57 km
14 May	14:38	SS4	Lagoudera — Spilia 2	38.32 km
14 May	16:01	SS5	Kourdali — Asinou 2	15.00 km
14 May	16:29	SS6	Asinou — Agios Theodoros 2	7.57 km
Leg 2 — 109.56 km
15 May	08:58	SS7	Platres — Saittas 1	11.12 km
15 May	09:36	SS8	Foini — Koilinia 1	30.33 km
15 May	10:34	SS9	Galatareia — Pentalia 1	13.33 km
15 May	15:03	SS10	Platres — Saittas 2	11.12 km
15 May	15:41	SS11	Foini — Koilinia 2	30.33 km
15 May	16:39	SS12	Galatareia — Pentalia 2	13.33 km
Leg 3 — 95.34 km
16 May	06:43	SS13	Vavatsinia — Mandra Kambiou 1	25.24 km
16 May	07:31	SS14	Macheras — Agioi Vavatsinias 1	12.94 km
16 May	08:14	SS15	Kellaki — Foinikaria 1	9.49 km
16 May	11:18	SS16	Vavatsinia — Mandra Kambiou 2	11.24 km
16 May	12:06	SS17	Macheras — Agioi Vavatsinias 2	16.03 km
16 May	12:49	SS18	Kellaki — Foinikaria 2	11.15 km

== Results ==
=== Overall ===
Pos.	No.	Driver	Co-driver	Team	Car	Time	Difference	Points
1	3	(France) Sébastien Loeb	(Monaco) Daniel Elena	(France) Citroën Total WRT	Citroën Xsara WRC	4:59:38.5		10
2	7	(Estonia) Markko Märtin	(United Kingdom) Michael Park	(United Kingdom) Ford Motor Co. Ltd.	Ford Focus RS WRC '04	4:59:53.6	+15.1	8
3	4	(Spain) Carlos Sainz	(Spain) Marc Martí	(France) Citroën Total WRT	Citroën Xsara WRC	5:02:02.5	+2:24.0	6
4	1	(Norway) Petter Solberg	(United Kingdom) Phil Mills	(Japan) 555 Subaru World Rally Team	Subaru Impreza S10 WRC '04	5:09:07.6	+9:29.1	5
5	2	(Finland) Mikko Hirvonen	(Finland) Jarmo Lehtinen	(Japan) 555 Subaru World Rally Team	Subaru Impreza S9 WRC '04	5:09:19.4	+9:40.9	4
6	11	(Finland) Janne Tuohino	(Finland) Jukka Aho	(Finland) Janne Tuohino	Ford Focus RS WRC '02	5:12:55.2	+13:16.7	3
7	15	(United Kingdom) Alistair Ginley	(Republic of Ireland) Rory Kennedy	(United Kingdom) Alistair Ginley	Subaru Impreza S9 WRC '03	5:26:22.3	+26:43.8	2
8	16	(Portugal) Miguel Campos	(Portugal) Nuno Rodrigues da Silva	(France) Bozian Racing	Peugeot 206 WRC	5:38:40.7	+39:02.2	1

=== World Rally Cars ===
==== Classification ====
Position		No.	Driver	Co-driver	Entrant	Car	Time	Difference	Points
Event	Class	No.	Driver	Co-driver	Entrant	Car	Time	Difference	Points
1	1	3	(France) Sébastien Loeb	(Monaco) Daniel Elena	(France) Citroën Total WRT	Citroën Xsara WRC	4:59:38.5		10
2	2	7	(Estonia) Markko Märtin	(United Kingdom) Michael Park	(United Kingdom) Ford Motor Co. Ltd.	Ford Focus RS WRC '04	4:59:53.6	+15.1	8
3	3	4	(Spain) Carlos Sainz	(Spain) Marc Martí	(France) Citroën Total WRT	Citroën Xsara WRC	5:02:02.5	+2:24.0	6
4	4	1	(Norway) Petter Solberg	(United Kingdom) Phil Mills	(Japan) 555 Subaru World Rally Team	Subaru Impreza S10 WRC '04	5:09:07.6	+9:29.1	5
5	5	2	(Finland) Mikko Hirvonen	(Finland) Jarmo Lehtinen	(Japan) 555 Subaru World Rally Team	Subaru Impreza S9 WRC '04	5:09:19.4	+9:40.9	4
Retired SS18		5	(Finland) Marcus Grönholm	(Finland) Timo Rautiainen	(France) Marlboro Peugeot Total	Peugeot 307 WRC	Excluded - illegal water pump		0
Retired SS18		6	(Finland) Harri Rovanperä	(Finland) Risto Pietiläinen	(France) Marlboro Peugeot Total	Peugeot 307 WRC	Excluded - illegal water pump		0
Retired SS10		9	(France) Gilles Panizzi	(France) Hervé Panizzi	(Japan) Mitsubishi Motors	Mitsubishi Lancer WRC 04	Engine		0
Retired SS8		10	(Finland) Kristian Sohlberg	(Finland) Kaj Lindström	(Japan) Mitsubishi Motors	Mitsubishi Lancer WRC 04	Engine		0
Retired SS1		8	(Belgium) François Duval	(Belgium) Stéphane Prévot	(United Kingdom) Ford Motor Co. Ltd.	Ford Focus RS WRC '03	Lost wheel		0

==== Special stages ====
Day	Stage	Stage name	Length	Winner	Car	Time	Class leaders
Leg 1 (14 May)	SS1	Lagoudera — Spilia 1	38.32 km	(Norway) Petter Solberg	Subaru Impreza S10 WRC '04	35:26.8	(Norway) Petter Solberg
Leg 1 (14 May)	SS2	Kourdali — Asinou 1	15.00 km	(Norway) Petter Solberg	Subaru Impreza S10 WRC '04	15:49.5	(Norway) Petter Solberg
Leg 1 (14 May)	SS3	Asinou — Agios Theodoros 1	7.57 km	(France) Sébastien Loeb	Citroën Xsara WRC	7:34.3	(Norway) Petter Solberg
Leg 1 (14 May)	SS4	Lagoudera — Spilia 2	38.32 km	(Finland) Marcus Grönholm	Peugeot 307 WRC	34:55.7	(Finland) Marcus Grönholm
Leg 1 (14 May)	SS5	Kourdali — Asinou 2	15.00 km	(France) Sébastien Loeb	Citroën Xsara WRC	15:32.2	(Finland) Marcus Grönholm
Leg 1 (14 May)	SS6	Asinou — Agios Theodoros 2	7.57 km	(Estonia) Markko Märtin	Ford Focus RS WRC '04	7:27.8	(Finland) Marcus Grönholm
Leg 2 (15 May)	SS7	Platres — Saittas 1	11.12 km	(Norway) Petter Solberg	Subaru Impreza S10 WRC '04	9:10.1	(Finland) Marcus Grönholm
Leg 2 (15 May)	SS8	Foini — Koilinia 1	30.33 km	(Norway) Petter Solberg	Subaru Impreza S10 WRC '04	27:17.1	(Finland) Marcus Grönholm
Leg 2 (15 May)	SS9	Galatareia — Pentalia 1	13.33 km	(France) Sébastien Loeb	Citroën Xsara WRC	10:43.0	(Finland) Marcus Grönholm
Leg 2 (15 May)	SS10	Platres — Saittas 2	11.12 km	(Norway) Petter Solberg	Subaru Impreza S10 WRC '04	9:04.0	(Finland) Marcus Grönholm
Leg 2 (15 May)	SS11	Foini — Koilinia 2	30.33 km	Notional stage time			(Finland) Marcus Grönholm
Leg 2 (15 May)	SS12	Galatareia — Pentalia 2	13.33 km	(France) Sébastien Loeb	Citroën Xsara WRC	10:28.2	(Finland) Marcus Grönholm
Leg 3 (16 May)	SS13	Vavatsinia — Mandra Kambiou 1	25.24 km	(Finland) Marcus Grönholm	Peugeot 307 WRC	23:06.8	(Finland) Marcus Grönholm
Leg 3 (16 May)	SS14	Macheras — Agioi Vavatsinias 1	12.94 km	(Finland) Marcus Grönholm	Peugeot 307 WRC	11:28.5	(Finland) Marcus Grönholm
Leg 3 (16 May)	SS15	Kellaki — Foinikaria 1	9.49 km	(France) Sébastien Loeb	Citroën Xsara WRC	8:28.3	(Finland) Marcus Grönholm
Leg 3 (16 May)	SS16	Vavatsinia — Mandra Kambiou 2	11.24 km	(Finland) Marcus Grönholm	Peugeot 307 WRC	22:52.6	(Finland) Marcus Grönholm
Leg 3 (16 May)	SS17	Macheras — Agioi Vavatsinias 2	16.03 km	(France) Sébastien Loeb (Finland) Marcus Grönholm	Citroën Xsara WRC; Peugeot 307 WRC	11:21.0	(Finland) Marcus Grönholm
Leg 3 (16 May)	SS18	Kellaki — Foinikaria 2	11.15 km	(Norway) Petter Solberg	Subaru Impreza S10 WRC '04	8:24.6	(France) Sébastien Loeb

==== Championship standings ====
Pos.	Drivers' championships			Co-drivers' championships			Manufacturers' championships		
Pos.	Move	Driver	Points	Move	Co-driver	Points	Move	Manufacturer	Points
1	1	(France) Sébastien Loeb	35	1	(Monaco) Daniel Elena	35		(United Kingdom) Ford Motor Co. Ltd.	55
2	1	(Estonia) Markko Märtin	34	1	(United Kingdom) Michael Park	34		(France) Citroën Total WRT	54
3	1	(Norway) Petter Solberg	28	1	(United Kingdom) Phil Mills	28	1	(Japan) 555 Subaru World Rally Team	40
4	1	(Finland) Marcus Grönholm	24	1	(Finland) Timo Rautiainen	24	1	(France) Marlboro Peugeot Total	33
5	1	(Spain) Carlos Sainz	19	1	(Spain) Marc Martí	19		(Japan) Mitsubishi Motors	5
