= 2005 Tour de Corse =

2005 Tour de Corse 49th Tour de Corse - Rallye de France
Round 14 of the 2005 World Rally Championship
| ← Previous event | Next event → |
- Host country: France
- Rally base: Ajaccio
- Dates run: October 21, 2005 – October 23, 2005
- Stages: 12 (341.68 km; 212.31 miles)
- Stage surface: Tarmac
- Overall distance: 1,024.48 km (636.58 miles)

Statistics
- Crews: 57 at start, 40 at finish

Overall results
- Overall winner: (France) Sébastien Loeb (France) Citroën World Rally Team; Citroën Xsara WRC

The 2005 Tour de Corse was the 14th round of the 2005 World Rally Championship. It took place between October 21, 2005, and October 23, 2005, at Ajaccio, France. Citroën's Sébastien Loeb won the race, his 19th win in the World Rally Championship. Loeb made history by winning all twelve stages in the rally, which marked the first time a driver had won every stage of a WRC rally.

== Results ==
Top 10 rankers of the 2005 Tour de Corse
| Rank | Driver | Co-driver | Car | Time taken |
|---|---|---|---|---|
| 1 | Sébastien Loeb (France) | Daniel Elena (Monaco) | Citroën Xsara WRC | 3:35:46.7 |
| 2 | Toni Gardemeister (Finland) | Jakke Honkanen (Finland) | Ford Focus WRC | 3:37:38.4 |
| 3 | Petter Solberg (Norway) | Phil Mills (United Kingdom) | Subaru WRC | 3:38:28.7 |
| 4 | Stéphane Sarrazin (France) | Denis Giraudet (France) | Subaru WRC | 3:39:20.9 |
| 5 | Roman Kresta (Czech Republic) | Jan Tománek (Czech Republic) | Ford Focus WRC | 3:41:08.2 |
| 6 | Alexandre Bengué (France) | Caroline Escudero (France) | Škoda Fabia WRC | 3:41:14.5 |
| 7 | Xavier Pons (Spain) | Carlos del Barrio (Spain) | Xsara WRC | 3:41:28.5 |
| 8 | Nicolas Bernandi (France) | Jean-Marc Fortin (Belgium) | Peugeot 307 WRC | 3:42:18.8 |
| 9 | Gigi Galli (Italy) | Guido D'Amore (Italy) | Mitsubishi Lancer WRC | 3:42:24.5 |
| 10 | Harri Rovanperä (Finland) | Risto Pietiläinen (Finland) | Mitsubishi Lancer WRC | 3:45:09.2 |
