= 2005 Wales Rally GB =

Rally car race

2005 Wales Rally GB 61st Wales Rally GB
Round 12 of the 2005 World Rally Championship
← Previous event	Next event →
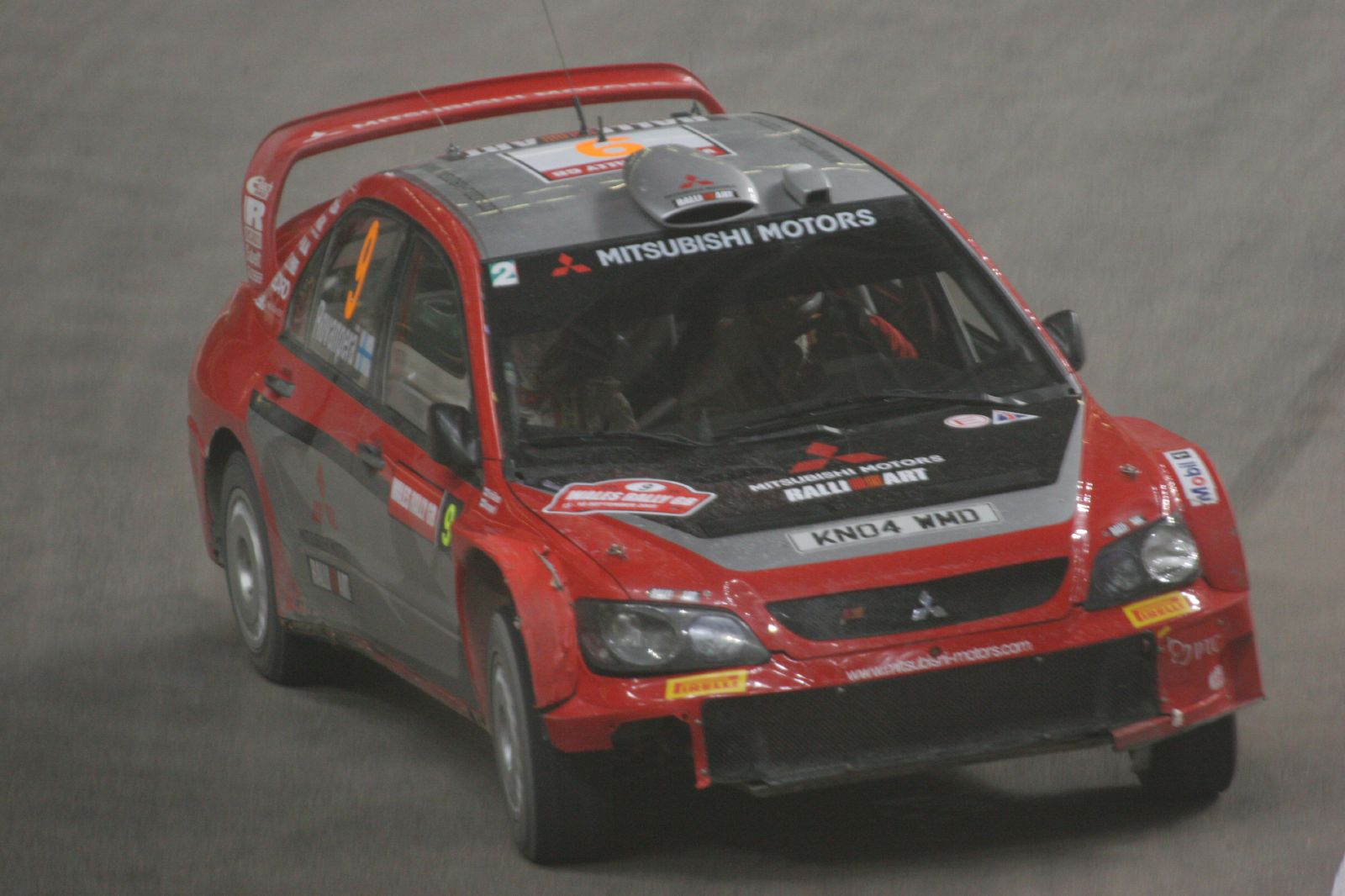
- Harri Rovanperä
- Host country: GBR
- Rally base: Cardiff, Wales, United Kingdom
- Dates run: September 15, 2005 – September 18, 2005
- Stages: 12 (354.22 km; 220.10 miles)
- Stage surface: Gravel
- Overall distance: 1,168.02 km (725.77 miles)

Statistics
- Crews: 80 at start, 56 at finish

Overall results
- Overall winner: (Norway) Petter Solberg (driver) (United Kingdom) Phil Mills (co-driver) (Japan) Subaru World Rally Team; Subaru Impreza S11 WRC '05

The 2005 Wales Rally GB (formally known as 61st Wales Rally GB) was the 12th round of the 2005 World Rally Championship. The race was held over four days between 15 and 18 September 2005, and operated out of Cardiff, Wales, United Kingdom.

== Report ==
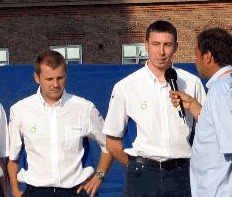
Michael Park (left) died during the 15th stage of the event, prompting Markko Märtin (right) to retire from the WRC.

This rally saw the death of Markko Märtin's co-driver Michael Park of Peugeot after Märtin's 307 lost control and traction, causing it to go off-road and crash into a tree at Stage 15 of the rally. Peugeot decided to withdraw Marcus Grönholm from the event due to the accident.

Race organizers cancelled the rally's final two stages, when Sébastien Loeb, who was in the lead, decided to take a time penalty that gave Petter Solberg the victory in the race. Loeb’s victory would have earned him the 2005 world championship, but he decided he did not want to win the title in such tragic circumstances. As a result, Loeb deliberately opted to check in to the final time control late to incur a two-minute penalty which dropped him to third overall.

Competitors returned to Cardiff to a subdued victory ceremony, where the traditional champagne-spraying ceremony was cancelled and a minute's silence was held.

== Statistics ==
=== Entry list ===
No.	Driver	Co-Driver	Entrant	Car	Tyre
World Rally Championship manufacturer entries
1	(France) Sébastien Loeb	(Monaco) Daniel Elena	(France) Citroën Total WRT	Citroën Xsara WRC	MI
2	(Belgium) François Duval	(Belgium) Sven Smeets	(France) Citroën Total WRT	Citroën Xsara WRC	MI
