= 2005 Rally Catalunya =

Motor racing competition

2005 Rally Catalunya 41st RallyRACC Catalunya - Costa Daurada
Round 15 of the 2005 World Rally Championship
← Previous event	Next event →
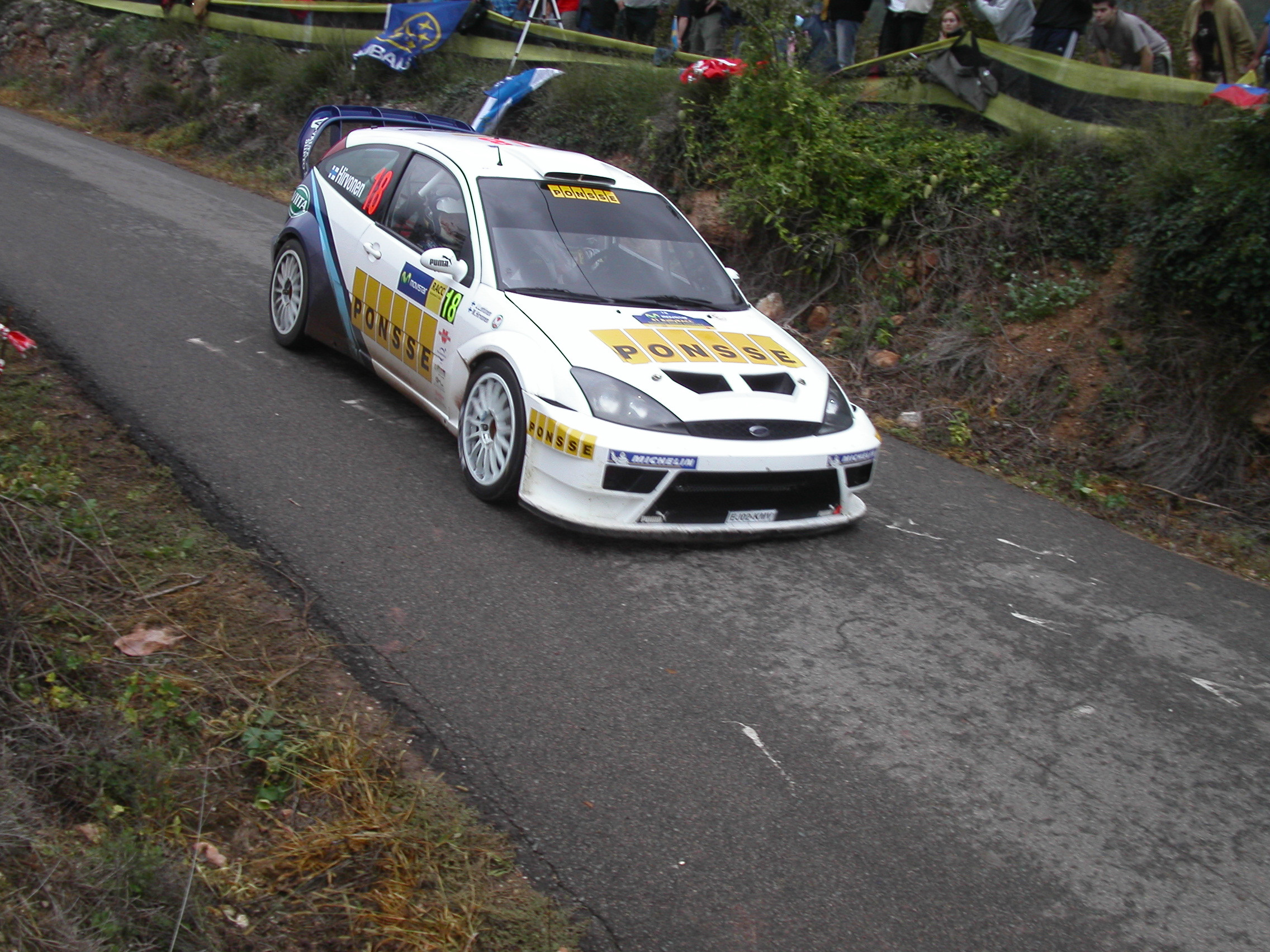
- Mikko Hirvonen
- Host country: Spain
- Dates run: 28 October – 30 October 2005
- Length: 358.75 km (222.92 miles)
- Stage surface: Tarmac
- Overall distance: 1,301.84 km (808.93 miles)

Statistics
- Crews: 58 at start, 40 at finish

Overall results
- Overall winner: (France) Sébastien Loeb (France) Citroën World Rally Team; Citroën Xsara WRC

The 2005 Rally Catalunya was the 15th round of the 2005 World Rally Championship. It took place between 28 and 30 October 2005. Citroën's Sébastien Loeb won the race, his 20th win in the World Rally Championship. Thanks to François Duval's second place, Citroën also secured its manufacturers' title. Mikko Hirvonen was third to take his first WRC podium.

== Results ==
Pos.	Driver	Co-driver	Car	Time	Difference	Points
1	(France) Sébastien Loeb	(Monaco) Daniel Elena	Citroën Xsara WRC	3:31.07.0		10
2	(Belgium) François Duval	(Belgium) Sven Smeets	Citroën Xsara WRC	3:32.28.9	+1:21.9	8
3	(Finland) Mikko Hirvonen	(Finland) Jarmo Lehtinen	Ford Focus WRC 03	3:33.53.7	+2:46.7	6
4	(Spain) Xavier Pons	(Spain) Carlos del Barrio	Citroën Xsara WRC	3:33.54.9	+2:47.9	5
5	(Czech Republic) Roman Kresta	(Czech Republic) Jan Tománek	Ford Focus WRC 04	3:34.31.6	+3:24.6	4
6	(France) Nicolas Bernardi	(Belgium) Jean Marc Fortin	Peugeot 307 WRC	3:35.16.4	+4:09.4	3
7	(Germany) Antony Warmbold	(United Kingdom) Michael Orr	Ford Focus RS WRC 04	3:36.07.3	+5:00.3	2
8	(Czech Republic) Jan Kopecky	(Czech Republic) Filip Schovánek	Škoda Fabia WRC	3:36.29.3	+5:22.3	1
