= 2005 Rally Japan =

2005 Rally Japan Rally Japan
Round 13 of the 2005 World Rally Championship
← Previous event	Next event →
- Host country: Japan
- Dates run: September 30, 2005 – October 2, 2005
- Stages: 26 (350.18 km; 217.59 miles)
- Stage surface: Dirt
- Overall distance: 1,614.84 km (1,003.42 miles)

Statistics
- Crews: 90 at start, 63 at finish

Overall results
- Overall winner: (Finland) Marcus Grönholm (France) Marlboro Peugeot Total; Peugeot 307 WRC

The 2005 Rally Japan was the 13th round of the 2005 World Rally Championship. It took place between September 30 and October 2, 2005. Peugeot's Marcus Grönholm won the race after capitalizing on then-leader Petter Solberg's accident after his Subaru hit a rock on the penultimate stage. It was Grönholm's 18th win in the World Rally Championship which he would dedicate to the late Michael Park, who was killed in an accident during the previous round, the Wales Rally GB.

Citroën's Sébastien Loeb finished in second place and thus became World Rally Champion in back-to-back seasons. This would prove to be the final World Rally Championship event to be won by a manufacturer other than Citroën or Ford until the 2013 Rally Sweden, 103 races and eight years later.

== Results ==
Pos.	Driver	Co-driver	Car	Time	Difference	Points
WRC
1.	(Finland) Marcus Grönholm	(Finland) Timo Rautiainen	(France) Peugeot 307 WRC	3:25:32.0		10
2.	(France) Sébastien Loeb	(Monaco) Daniel Elena	(France) Citroën Xsara WRC	3:26:54.1	+1:22.1	8
3.	(Australia) Chris Atkinson	(Australia) Glenn MacNeall	(Japan) Subaru Impreza S11 WRC '05	3:28:12.0	+2:40.0	6
4.	(Belgium) François Duval	(Belgium) Sven Smeets	(France) Citroën Xsara WRC	3:28:31.4	+2:59.4	5
5.	(Finland) Harri Rovanperä	(Finland) Risto Pietiläinen	(Japan) Mitsubishi Lancer WRC 05	3:29:31.8	+3:59.8	4
6.	(Finland) Toni Gardemeister	(Finland) Jakke Honkanen	(United States) Ford Focus RS WRC '04	3:30:04.3	+4:32.3	3
7.	(Czech Republic) Roman Kresta	(Czech Republic) Jan Tománek	(United States) Ford Focus RS WRC '04	3:31:04.0	+5:32.0	2
8.	(Sweden) Daniel Carlsson	(Sweden) Mattias Andersson	(France) Peugeot 307 WRC	3:32:11.1	+6:39.1	1
