= 2005 Rally Australia =

2005 Rally Australia 18th Telstra Rally Australia
Round 16 of the 2005 World Rally Championship
← Previous event
- Host country: Australia
- Dates run: 10 November – 13 November 2005
- Length: 355.39 km (220.83 miles)
- Stage surface: Gravel
- Overall distance: 1,345.41 km (836.00 miles)

Statistics
- Crews: 60 at start, 43 at finish

Overall results
- Overall winner: (Belgium) François Duval (France) Citroën World Rally Team; Citroën Xsara WRC

The 2005 Rally Australia was the 16th round of the 2005 World Rally Championship. It took place between 10 and 13 November 2005. Citroën's François Duval won the race, his 1st win in the World Rally Championship. This was the first time a Belgian driver had won a WRC event. The rally was the final appearance of the Peugeot, Mitsubishi and Škoda factory teams in the WRC.

== Results ==
Pos.	Driver	Co-driver	Car	Time	Difference	Points
1	(Belgium) François Duval	(Belgium) Sven Smeets	Citroën Xsara WRC	3:19.55.0		10
2	(Finland) Harri Rovanperä	(Finland) Risto Pietiläinen	Mitsubishi Lancer WRC	3:20.47.9	+52.9	8
3	(Austria) Manfred Stohl	(Austria) Ilka Minor	Citroën Xsara WRC	3:21.28.0	+1.33.0	6
4	(Australia) Chris Atkinson	(Australia) Glenn MacNeall	Subaru Impreza WRC	3:21.34.0	+1.39.0	5
5	(Italy) Gigi Galli	(Italy) Guido D'Amore	Mitsubishi Lancer WRC	3:22.59.4	+3.04.4	4
6	(Czech Republic) Roman Kresta	(Czech Republic) Jan Tománek	Ford Focus WRC	3:23.04,0	+3.09,0	3
7	(Spain) Daniel Solà	(Spain) Xavier Amigo	Ford Focus WRC	3:26.12.4	+6.17.4	2
8	(Germany) Armin Schwarz	(Germany) Klaus Wicha	Škoda Fabia WRC	3:27.59.3	+8.04.3	1
