= Fumio Nutahara =

Japanese rally driver (born 1963)

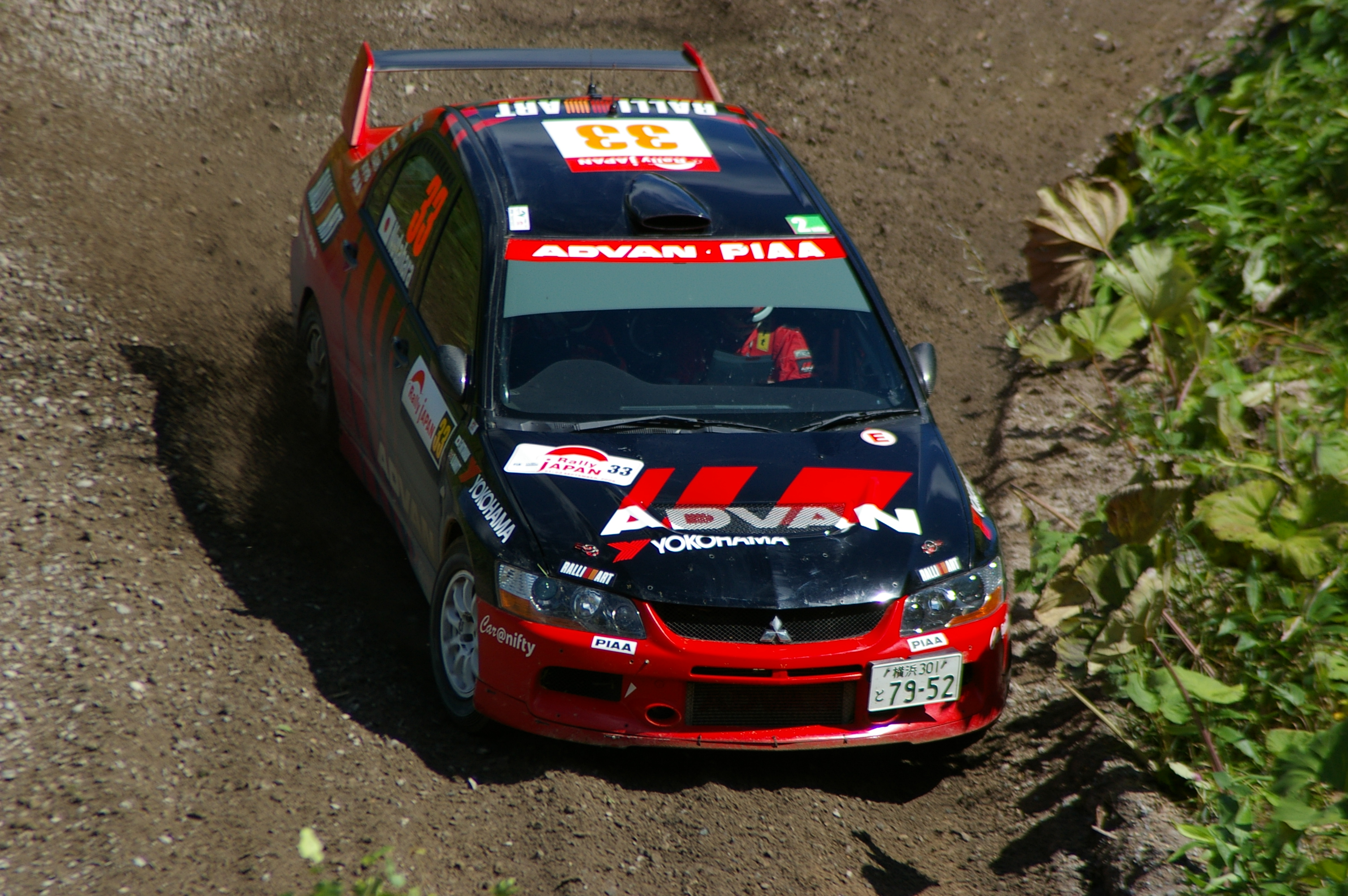
- Nutahara on his way to finishing eighth in the 2006 Rally Japan

Personal information
- Nationality: (Japan) Japanese
- Born: 20 December 1963 (age 62); Kōchi City

World Rally Championship record
- Years active: 1999–2010
- Co-driver: (Japan) Noriyuki Odagiri (Japan) Satoshi Hayashi (United Kingdom) Daniel Barritt (Japan) Tadayoshi Sato
- Rallies: 37
- Championships: 0
- Rally wins: 0
- Podiums: 0
- Stage wins: 0
- Total points: 1
- First rally: 1999 Rally New Zealand
- Last rally: 2010 Rally Japan

Fumio Nutahara (奴田原 文雄, Nutahara Fumio; born 20 December 1963) is a Japanese rally driver. He finished eighth on the 2006 Rally Japan to score one World Rally Championship point.

== Career ==
Nutahara made his WRC debut in 1999, contesting Rally New Zealand and the China Rally in a Mitsubishi Lancer Evo V. In 2004, he competed in the Production World Rally Championship in a Mitsubishi Lancer Evo VIII, finishing the year ninth in the standings. In 2005, he improved to fourth in the final standings.

In 2006, driving a Mitsubishi Lancer Evo IX, Nutahara scored his first PWRC victory on Monte Carlo Rally. He then won again in Japan, also finishing eighth overall, and in Cyprus. He finished the PWRC season as runner-up. In 2007 and 2008, he finished seventh in the PWRC standings.

After a break from the WRC, Nutahara returned to contest the 2010 Rally Japan in a Ford Fiesta, finishing 23rd.
