= Ford World Rally Team results =

The table below shows all results of Ford World Rally Team in World Rally Championship.

== WRC results ==
=== Group 4 era ===
Year	Car	Driver	1	2	3	4	5	6	7	8	9	10	11	12	13	WDC	Points	WMC	Points
1979	Ford Escort RS1800	(Sweden) Björn Waldegård	MON; 2	SWE; 2	POR; 2	KEN	GRC	NZL	FIN; 3	CAN; 1	ITA	FRA	GBR; 9	CIV		1st	120	1st	122
1979	Ford Escort RS1800	(Finland) Hannu Mikkola	MON; 5	SWE; 5	POR; 1	KEN	GRC	NZL; 1	FIN; Ret	CAN	ITA	FRA	GBR; 1	CIV		2nd	111	1st	122
1979	Ford Escort RS1800	(Finland) Ari Vatanen	MON	SWE	POR	KEN	GRC	NZL; 3	FIN	CAN	ITA	FRA	GBR	CIV		5th	50	1st	122

=== Group B era ===
Year	Car	Driver	1	2	3	4	5	6	7	8	9	10	11	12	13	WDC	Points	WMC	Points
1986	Ford RS200	(Sweden) Stig Blomqvist	MON	SWE; Ret	POR; Ret	KEN	FRA	GRC; Ret	NZL	ARG	FIN	CIV	ITA	GBR; Ret	USA	11th*	22*	5th	24
1986	Ford RS200	(Sweden) Kalle Grundel	MON	SWE; 3	POR; Ret	KEN	FRA	GRC; Ret	NZL	ARG	FIN	CIV	ITA	GBR; 5	USA	9th*	26*	5th	24
1986	Ford RS200	(Portugal) Joaquim Santos	MON	SWE	POR; Ret	KEN	FRA	GRC	NZL	ARG	FIN	CIV	ITA	GBR	USA	–	0	5th	24
1986	Ford RS200	(United Kingdom) Mark Lovell	MON	SWE	POR	KEN	FRA	GRC	NZL	ARG	FIN	CIV	ITA	GBR; Ret	USA	–	0	5th	24
1986	Ford RS200	(Sweden) Stig Andervang	MON	SWE	POR	KEN	FRA	GRC	NZL	ARG	FIN	CIV	ITA	GBR; Ret	USA	–	0	5th	24

=== Group A era ===
Year	Car	No	Driver	1	2	3	4	5	6	7	8	9	10	11	12	13	14	WDC	Points	WMC	Points
1987	Ford Sierra RS Cosworth		(Sweden) Stig Blomqvist	MON; Ret	SWE; 6	POR	KEN; Ret	FRA; Ret	GRC	USA	NZL; Ret	ARG	FIN; 3	CIV	ITA	GBR; 2		7th	33	5th	62
1987	Ford Sierra RS Cosworth		(Sweden) Kalle Grundel	MON; 84	SWE; Ret	POR	KEN; Ret	FRA; Ret	GRC	USA	NZL	ARG	FIN	CIV	ITA	GBR		–	0	5th	62
1987	Ford Sierra RS Cosworth		(France) Didier Auriol	MON; Ret	SWE	POR	KEN	FRA; 8	GRC	USA	NZL	ARG	FIN	CIV	ITA; 4	GBR		22nd	13	5th	62
1987	Ford Sierra RS Cosworth		(Spain) Carlos Sainz	MON	SWE	POR; Ret	KEN	FRA; 7	GRC	USA	NZL	ARG	FIN	CIV	ITA	GBR; 8		35th	7	5th	62
1987	Ford Sierra RS Cosworth		(Portugal) Joaquim Santos	MON	SWE	POR; 9	KEN	FRA	GRC	USA	NZL	ARG	FIN	CIV	ITA	GBR		58th	2	5th	62
1987	Ford Sierra RS Cosworth		(Kenya) John Hellier	MON	SWE	POR	KEN; Ret	FRA	GRC	USA	NZL	ARG	FIN	CIV	ITA	GBR		–	0	5th	62
1987	Ford Sierra RS Cosworth		(Finland) Ari Vatanen	MON	SWE	POR	KEN	FRA	GRC	USA	NZL	ARG	FIN; 2	CIV	ITA	GBR		19th*	16*	5th	62
1987	Ford Sierra RS Cosworth		(United Kingdom) Mark Lowell	MON	SWE	POR	KEN	FRA	GRC	USA	NZL	ARG	FIN	CIV	ITA	GBR; Ret		–	0	5th	62
1988	Ford Sierra RS Cosworth		(Sweden) Stig Blomqvist	MON	SWE	POR	KEN	FRA	GRC	USA	NZL	ARG	FIN; 5	CIV	ITA; 7	GBR; 6		4th*	41*	2nd	79
1988	Ford Sierra RS Cosworth		(France) Didier Auriol	MON	SWE	POR	KEN	FRA; 1	GRC	USA	NZL	ARG	FIN; 3	CIV	ITA; Ret	GBR		6th*	32*	2nd	79
1988	Ford Sierra RS Cosworth		(Spain) Carlos Sainz	MON	SWE	POR	KEN	FRA; 5	GRC	USA	NZL	ARG	FIN; 6	CIV	ITA; 5	GBR; 7		11th	26	2nd	79
1988	Ford Sierra RS Cosworth		(United Kingdom) Mark Lowell	MON	SWE	POR	KEN	FRA	GRC	USA	NZL	ARG	FIN	CIV	ITA	GBR; 17		–	0	2nd	79
1992	Ford Sierra RS Cosworth		(Italy) Miki Biasion	MON; 8	SWE	POR; 2	KEN	FRA; 7	GRC; 3	NZL	ARG	FIN; 5	AUS	ITA; 4	CIV	ESP	GBR; 5	4th	60	3rd	94
1992	Ford Sierra RS Cosworth		(France) François Delecour	MON; 4	SWE	POR; Ret	KEN	FRA; 2	GRE; 5	NZL	ARG	FIN; Ret	AUS	ITA; 3	CIV	ESP; Ret	GBR	6th	45	3rd	94
1992	Ford Sierra RS Cosworth		(Italy) Gianfranco Cunico	MON	SWE	POR	KEN	FRA	GRE	NZL	ARG	FIN	AUS	ITA; Ret	CIV	ESP	GBR	–	0	3rd	94
1992	Ford Sierra RS Cosworth		(Spain) Josep Maria Bardolet	MON	SWE	POR	KEN	FRA	GRE	NZL	ARG	FIN	AUS	ITA	CIV	ESP; Ret	GBR	–	0	3rd	94
1992	Ford Sierra RS Cosworth		(United Kingdom) Malcolm Wilson	MON	SWE	POR	KEN	FRA	GRE	NZL	ARG	FIN	AUS	ITA	CIV	ESP	GBR; 9	58th	2	3rd	94
1993	Ford Escort RS Cosworth		(Italy) Miki Biasion	MON; 3	SWE	POR; 2	KEN	FRA; 7	GRC; 1	ARG; 2	NZL; Ret	FIN	AUS; Ret	ITA; Ret	ESP; 4	GBR		4th	76	2nd	145
1993	Ford Escort RS Cosworth		(France) François Delecour	MON; 2	SWE	POR; 1	KEN	FRA; 1	GRE; Ret	ARG	NZL; 2	FIN	AUS; 3	ITA; Ret	ESP; 1	GBR; 4		2nd	112	2nd	145
1993	Ford Escort RS Cosworth		(Sweden) Mikael Ericsson	MON	SWE; Ret	POR	KEN	FRA	GRC	ARG	NZL	FIN	AUS	ITA	ESP	GBR		–	0	2nd	145
1993	Ford Escort RS Cosworth		(Finland) Sebastian Lindholm	MON	SWE; Ret	POR	KEN	FRA	GRC	ARG	NZL	FIN; 6	AUS	ITA	ESP	GBR; Ret		31st	6	2nd	145
1993	Ford Escort RS Cosworth		(United Kingdom) Malcolm Wilson	MON	SWE; Ret	POR	KEN	FRA	GRC	ARG	NZL	FIN; Ret	AUS	ITA	ESP	GBR; 3		19th	12	2nd	145
1993	Ford Escort RS Cosworth		(Portugal) Fernando Peres	MON	SWE	POR; Ret	KEN	FRA	GRC	ARG	NZL	FIN	AUS	ITA	ESP	GBR		–	0	2nd	145
1994	Ford Escort RS Cosworth		(Italy) Miki Biasion	MON; 4	POR; 3	KEN	FRA; 5	GRC; Ret	ARG; Ret	NZL; Ret	FIN	ITA; 3	GBR; Ret					6th	42	3rd	116
1994	Ford Escort RS Cosworth		(France) François Delecour	MON; 1	POR; Ret	KEN	FRA	GRE	ARG	NZL	FIN; 4	ITA; Ret	GBR; EX					8th	30	3rd	116
1994	Ford Escort RS Cosworth		(Belgium) Bruno Thiry	MON; 6	POR; Ret	KEN	FRA; 6	GRE	ARG; 4	NZL	FIN; Ret	ITA; 4	GBR; 3					5th	44	3rd	116
1994	Ford Escort RS Cosworth		(Italy) Gianfranco Cunico	MON	POR	KEN	FRA; Ret	GRE	ARG	NZL	FIN	ITA	GBR					25th*	6*	3rd	116
1994	Ford Escort RS Cosworth		(United Kingdom) Malcolm Wilson	MON	POR	KEN	FRA	GRE; 6	ARG	NZL	FIN	ITA	GBR; Ret					23rd*	8*	3rd	116
1994	Ford Escort RS Cosworth		(Finland) Ari Vatanen	MON	POR	KEN	FRA	GRE	ARG; 3	NZL; Ret	FIN	ITA	GBR					9th*	28*	3rd	116
1994	Ford Escort RS Cosworth		(Finland) Tommi Mäkinen	MON	POR	KEN	FRA	GRE	ARG	NZL	FIN; 1	ITA	GBR					10th*	22*	3rd	116
1994	Ford Escort RS Cosworth		(Sweden) Stig Blomqvist	MON	POR	KEN	FRA	GRE	ARG	NZL	FIN	ITA	GBR; 4					15th	10	3rd	116
1995	Ford Escort RS Cosworth	7	(France) François Delecour	MON; 2	SWE; Ret	POR; Ret	FRA; 2	NZL; 6	AUS; Ret	ESP; 4	GBR; Ret							4th	46	3rd	223
1995	Ford Escort RS Cosworth	8	(Belgium) Bruno Thiry	MON; 5	SWE; 6	POR; 6	FRA; Ret	NZL; Ret	AUS; 6	ESP; Ret	GBR; 5							6th	34	3rd	223
1995	Ford Escort RS Cosworth	9	(Sweden) Stig Blomqvist	MON	SWE; 7													14th	4	3rd	223
1995	Ford Escort RS Cosworth	9	(Italy) Alex Fiorio			POR; 8												21st	3	3rd	223
1995	Ford Escort RS Cosworth	9	(France) Patrick Bernardini				FRA; 7											14th	4	3rd	223
1995	Ford Escort RS Cosworth	9	(New Zealand) Neil Allport					NZL; 8										21st	3	3rd	223
1995	Ford Escort RS Cosworth	9	(United Kingdom) Malcolm Wilson								GBR; Ret							–	0	3rd	223
1996	Ford Escort RS Cosworth	4	(Spain) Carlos Sainz	SWE; 2	KEN; Ret	IDN; 1	GRC; 3	ARG; 2	FIN; Ret	AUS; 3	ITA; 2	ESP; Ret						3rd	89	3rd	299
1996	Ford Escort RS Cosworth	5	(France) François Delecour	SWE; 11														–	0	3rd	299
1996	Ford Escort RS Cosworth	5	(Sweden) Stig Blomqvist		KEN; 7													18th	7	3rd	299
1996	Ford Escort RS Cosworth	5	(United Kingdom) Gwyndaf Evans			IDN; Ret												–	0	3rd	299
1996	Ford Escort RS Cosworth	5	(Belgium) Bruno Thiry				GRC; 6	ARG; 5	FIN; 11	AUS; 6	ITA; 3	ESP; 3						6th	44	3rd	299
1996	Ford Escort RS Cosworth	6	(Sweden) Stig Blomqvist	SWE; 8														18th	7	3rd	299
1996	Ford Escort RS Cosworth	6	(Indonesia) Dandy Rukmana		KEN	IDN; Ret	GRC	ARG	FIN	AUS	ITA	ESP						–	0	3rd	299
1996	Ford Escort RS Cosworth	14	(Finland) Ari Vatanen	SWE; Ret	KEN	IDN	GRC	ARG	FIN	AUS	ITA	ESP						–	0	3rd	299

=== WRC era ===
Year	Car	No	Driver	1	2	3	4	5	6	7	8	9	10	11	12	13	14	15	16	WDC	Points	WMC	Points
1997	Ford Escort WRC	5	(Spain) Carlos Sainz	MON; 2	SWE; 2	KEN; Ret	POR; Ret	ESP; 10	FRA; 2	ARG; Ret	GRE; 1	NZL; 2	FIN; Ret	IDN; 1	ITA; 4	AUS; Ret	GBR; 3			3rd	51	2nd	90
1997	Ford Escort WRC	6	(Germany) Armin Schwarz	MON; 4	SWE; 6	KEN; 4	POR; 3	ESP; Ret	FRA; 9											8th	11	2nd	90
1997	Ford Escort WRC	6	(Finland) Juha Kankkunen							ARG; Ret	GRC; 2	NZL; 3	FIN; 2	IDN; 2	ITA; 6	AUS; Ret	GBR; 2			4th	29	2nd	90
1997	Ford Escort WRC	16	(Italy) Angelo Medeghini	MON	SWE	KEN	POR	ESP	FRA	ARG	GRE	NZL	FIN	IDN	ITA	AUS	GBR; 10			23rd	2	2nd	90
1998	Ford Escort WRC	7	(Finland) Juha Kankkunen	MON; 2	SWE; 3	KEN; 2	POR; 7	ESP; Ret	FRA; 9	ARG; 3	GRC; 3	NZL; 4	FIN; 3	ITA; Ret	AUS; 5	GBR; 2				4th	39	4th	53
1998	Ford Escort WRC	8	(Belgium) Bruno Thiry	MON; 6	SWE; 8	KEN	POR	ESP; Ret	FRA; 5	ARG; Ret	GRC; Ret	NZL; Ret	FIN; 10	ITA; 6	AUS; 7	GBR; 3				9th	8	4th	53
1998	Ford Escort WRC	8	(Finland) Ari Vatanen			KEN; 3	POR; 5													11th	6	4th	53
1998	Ford Escort WRC	11	(Finland) Ari Vatanen	MON	SWE			ESP	FRA	ARG	GRC	NZL	FIN; Ret	ITA	AUS	GBR				11th	6	4th	53
1999	Ford Focus WRC 99	7	(United Kingdom) Colin McRae	MON; DSQ	SWE; Ret	KEN; 1	POR; 1	ESP; Ret	FRA; 4	ARG; Ret	GRC; Ret	NZL; Ret	FIN; Ret	CHN; Ret	ITA; Ret	AUS; Ret	GBR; Ret			6th	23	4th	37
1999	Ford Focus WRC 99	8	(France) Simon Jean-Joseph	MON; Ret				ESP; Ret	FRA; Ret						ITA; 7					–	0	4th	37
1999	Ford Focus WRC 99	8	(Sweden) Thomas Rådström		SWE; 3					ARG; 6	GRC; Ret	NZL; Ret	FIN; Ret	CHN; Ret		AUS; 7	GBR; 6			12th	6	4th	37
1999	Ford Focus WRC 99	8	(Norway) Petter Solberg			KEN; 5	POR; 11													19th	2	4th	37
1999	Ford Focus WRC 99	–	(Norway) Petter Solberg					ESP	FRA	ARG	GRC	NZL	FIN; 12	CHN	ITA; 27	AUS	GBR; 9			19th	2	4th	37
1999	Ford Escort WRC	–	(Norway) Petter Solberg	MON	SWE; 11															19th	2	4th	37
2000	Ford Focus RS WRC 00	5	(United Kingdom) Colin McRae	MON; Ret	SWE; 3	KEN; Ret	POR; Ret	ESP; 1	ARG; Ret	GRC; 1	NZL; 2	FIN; 2	CYP; 2	FRA; Ret	ITA; 6	AUS; Ret	GBR; Ret			4th	43	2nd	91
2000	Ford Focus RS WRC 00	6	(Spain) Carlos Sainz	MON; 2	SWE; Ret	KEN; 4	POR; 3	ESP; 3	ARG; Ret	GRC; 2	NZL; 3	FIN; 14	CYP; 1	FRA; 3	ITA; 5	AUS; DSQ	GBR; 4			3rd	46	2nd	91
2000	Ford Focus RS WRC 00	16	(Norway) Petter Solberg	MON	SWE	KEN; 5	POR; Ret	ESP	ARG; 6	GRC; Ret	NZL; 4	FIN; Ret	CYP	FRA	ITA	AUS	GBR			10th	6	2nd	91
2000	Ford Focus RS WRC 00	18	(Italy) Piero Liatti	MON	SWE	KEN	POR	ESP	ARG	GRC	NZL	FIN	CYP	FRA; 6	ITA; Ret					24th	1	2nd	91
2000	Ford Focus RS WRC 00	18	(Finland) Tapio Laukkanen													AUS; 5	GBR; Ret			20th	2	2nd	91
2001	Ford Focus RS WRC 01	3	(Spain) Carlos Sainz	MON; 2	SWE; 3	POR; 2	ESP; 5	ARG; 3	CYP; 3	GRC; Ret	KEN; Ret	FIN; 6	NZL; 4	ITA; 4	FRA; Ret	AUS; 8	GBR; Ret			6th	33	2nd	86
2001	Ford Focus RS WRC 01	4	(United Kingdom) Colin McRae	MON; Ret	SWE; 9	POR; Ret	ESP; Ret	ARG; 1	CYP; 1	GRC; 1	KEN; Ret	FIN; 3	NZL; 2	ITA; 8	FRA; 11	AUS; 5	GBR; Ret			2nd	42	2nd	86
2001	Ford Focus RS WRC 01	17	(France) François Delecour	MON; 3	SWE; 5	POR; 5	ESP; 6	ARG; 7	CYP; Ret	GRE; 5	KEN; 4	FIN; Ret	NZL; 12	ITA; 6	FRA; 10	AUS; Ret				9th	15	2nd	86
2001	Ford Focus RS WRC 01	17	(United Kingdom) Mark Higgins														GBR; Ret			–	0	2nd	86
2001	Ford Focus RS WRC 01	21	(Italy) Paolo Andreucci	MON	SWE	POR	ESP	ARG	CYP	GRC	KEN	FIN	NZL	ITA; Ret	FRA	AUS	GBR			–	0	2nd	86
2002	Ford Focus RS WRC 02	4	(Spain) Carlos Sainz	MON; 3	SWE; 3	FRA; 6	ESP; Ret	CYP; 11	ARG; 1	GRC; 3	KEN; Ret	FIN; 4	GER; 8	ITA; Ret	NZL; 4	AUS; 4	GBR; 3			3rd	36	2nd	104
2002	Ford Focus RS WRC 02	5	(United Kingdom) Colin McRae	MON; 4	SWE; 6	FRA; Ret	ESP; 6	CYP; 6	ARG; 3	GRC; 1	KEN; 1	FIN; Ret	GER; 4	ITA; 8	NZL; Ret	AUS; Ret	GBR; 5			4th	35	2nd	104
2002	Ford Focus RS WRC 02	6	(Estonia) Markko Märtin	MON; 12	SWE	FRA; 8	ESP; 8	CYP; 8	ARG; 4	GRC; 6	KEN; 4	FIN; 5	GER; 6	ITA; 5	NZL; Ret	AUS; 5	GBR; 2			9th	20	2nd	104
2002	Ford Focus RS WRC 02	24	(Belgium) François Duval	MON	SWE	FRA	ESP	CYP; Ret	ARG	GRC	KEN	FIN; Ret	GER	ITA	NZL	AUS; Ret				–	0	2nd	104
2002	Ford Focus RS WRC 02	24	(United Kingdom) Mark Higgins														GBR; 6			20th	1	2nd	104
2003	Ford Focus RS WRC 02	4	(Estonia) Markko Märtin	MON; 4	SWE; 4	TUR; 6														5th	49	4th	93
2003	Ford Focus RS WRC 03	4	(Estonia) Markko Märtin				NZL; Ret	ARG; Ret	GRC; 1	CYP; Ret	GER; 5	FIN; 1	AUS; DSQ	ITA; 3	FRA; Ret	ESP; 3	GBR; Ret			5th	49	4th	93
2003	Ford Focus RS WRC 02	5	(Belgium) François Duval	MON; 7	SWE; Ret	TUR; 3														9th	30	4th	93
2003	Ford Focus RS WRC 03	5	(Belgium) François Duval				NZL; 9	ARG; 8	GRE; Ret	CYP; Ret	GER; 7	FIN; Ret	AUS; 10	ITA; 5	FRA; 3	ESP; 4	GBR; 5			9th	30	4th	93
2003	Ford Focus RS WRC 02	6	(Finland) Mikko Hirvonen	MON; Ret	SWE; 11	TUR; Ret	NZL; 10	ARG; 16	GRC; Ret	CYP; 6	GER; 13	FIN; Ret	AUS; 9	ITA; Ret	FRA; 10	ESP; 14	GBR; Ret			16th	3	4th	93
2003	Ford Focus RS WRC 02	20	(Finland) Jari-Matti Latvala	MON	SWE	TUR	NZL	ARG	GRE; 10	CYP	GER; 17	FIN; 14	AUS	ITA	FRA	ESP	GBR; 10			–	0	4th	93
2004	Ford Focus RS WRC 03	7	(Estonia) Markko Märtin	MON; 2	SWE; 7	MEX; 1														3rd	79	2nd	143
2004	Ford Focus RS WRC 04	7	(Estonia) Markko Märtin				NZL; 3	CYP; 2	GRC; Ret	TUR; 24	ARG; Ret	FIN; 2	GER; 4	JAP; 3	GBR; 3	ITA; Ret	FRA; 1	ESP; 1	AUS; Ret	3rd	79	2nd	143
2004	Ford Focus RS WRC 03	8	(Belgium) François Duval	MON; 3		MEX; 2														6th	53	2nd	143
2004	Ford Focus RS WRC 04	8	(Belgium) François Duval				NZL; 18	CYP; Ret	GRE; 4	TUR; 5	ARG; 3		GER; 2	JPN; Ret	GBR; 5	ITA; 5	FRA; Ret	ESP; Ret	AUS; 3	6th	53	2nd	143
2004	Ford Focus RS WRC 03	8	(Finland) Janne Tuohino		SWE; 4															9th	16	2nd	143
2004	Ford Focus RS WRC 04	8	(Finland) Janne Tuohino									FIN; 5								9th	16	2nd	143
2004	Ford Focus RS WRC 02	11	(Germany) Anthony Warmbold	MON; Ret	SWE; 15	MEX; 9	NZL; 19	CYP; Ret	GRE; 9	TUR; 8	ARG; 9	FIN; Ret	GER; 13	JAP; 8	GBR; 10	ITA; 8	FRA; 20	ESP; 13	AUS; 14	25th	3	2nd	143
2004	Ford Focus RS WRC 03	15	(Belgium) François Duval		SWE; Ret															6th	53	2nd	143
2004	Ford Focus RS WRC 04	15	(Belgium) François Duval									FIN; 7								6th	53	2nd	143
2005	Ford Focus RS WRC 04	3	(Finland) Toni Gardemeister	MON; 2	SWE; 3	MEX; 6	NZL; 6	ITA; 5	CYP; 5	TUR; 6	GRE; 2	ARG; 4	FIN; 6	GER; 17	GBR; DSQ	JPN; 6	FRA; 2	ESP; 14		4th	58	3rd	104
2005	Ford Focus RS WRC 06	3	(Finland) Toni Gardemeister																AUS; Ret	4th	58	3rd	104
2005	Ford Focus RS WRC 04	4	(Czech Republic) Roman Kresta	MON; 8			NZL; DNS	ITA; 6	CYP; 6	TUR; 7	GRC; Ret	ARG; 11		GER; 6	GBR; 6	JPN; 7	FRA; 5	ESP; 5		8th	29	3rd	104
2005	Ford Focus RS WRC 06	4	(Czech Republic) Roman Kresta																AUS; 6	8th	29	3rd	104
2005	Ford Focus RS WRC 04	4	(Norway) Henning Solberg		SWE; 5															14th	9	3rd	104
2005	Ford Focus RS WRC 04	4	(Spain) Dani Solà			MEX; Ret														22nd	2	3rd	104
2005	Ford Focus RS WRC 04	4	(Finland) Mikko Hirvonen										FIN; 5							10th	14	3rd	104
2005	Ford Focus RS WRC 04	–	(Czech Republic) Roman Kresta		SWE; 8	MEX; Ret							FIN; 23							8th	29	3rd	104
2005	Ford Focus RS WRC 04	–	(Norway) Henning Solberg	MON		MEX	NZL	ITA; 15	CYP; 4	TUR; 11	GRE; Ret	ARG	FIN; 9	GER	GBR; 10	JPN	FRA	ESP	AUS	14th	9	3rd	104
2005	Ford Focus RS WRC 04	–	(Spain) Dani Solà	MON	SWE		NZL	ITA	CYP	TUR	GRE	ARG	FIN	GER; 12	GBR	JPN; Ret	FRA; Ret	ESP; Ret	AUS; 7	22nd	2	3rd	104
2005	Ford Focus RS WRC 04	–	(Germany) Anthony Warmbold	MON; 10	SWE; 11	MEX; 7	NZL; 11	ITA; 7	CYP; Ret	TUR; 9	GRE; Ret	ARG; 12	FIN; Ret	GER	GBR; 12	JAP; 9	FRA; 13	ESP; 7	AUS; Ret	18th	6	3rd	104
2005	Ford Focus RS WRC 04	–	(Argentina) Luís Pérez Companc	MON	SWE	MEX	NZL; Ret	ITA	CYP	TUR	GRE	ARG; 14	FIN	GER	GBR	JPN	FRA	ESP	AUS	–	0	3rd	104
2006	Ford Focus RS WRC 06	3	(Finland) Marcus Grönholm	MON; 1	SWE; 1	MEX; 8	ESP; 3	FRA; 2	ARG; 10	ITA; Ret	GRC; 1	GER; 3	FIN; 1	JPN; 2	CYP; 2	TUR; 1	AUS; 5	NZL; 1	GBR; 1	2nd	111	1st	195
2006	Ford Focus RS WRC 06	4	(Finland) Mikko Hirvonen	MON; 7	SWE; 12	MEX; 14	ESP; 9	FRA; 4	ARG; Ret	ITA; 2	GRC; 3	GER; 9	FIN; 3	JPN; 3	CYP; 3	TUR; 2	AUS; 1	NZL; 2	GBR; Ret	3rd	65	1st	195
2007	Ford Focus RS WRC 06	3	(Finland) Marcus Grönholm	MON; 3	SWE; 1	NOR; 2	MEX; 2	POR; 4	ARG; 2	ITA; 1	GRC; 1									2nd	112	1st	212
2007	Ford Focus RS WRC 07	3	(Finland) Marcus Grönholm									FIN; 1	GER; 4	NZL; 1	ESP; 3	FRA; 2	JPN; Ret	IRE; Ret	GBR; 2	2nd	112	1st	212
2007	Ford Focus RS WRC 06	4	(Finland) Mikko Hirvonen	MON; 5	SWE; 3	NOR; 1	MEX; 3	POR; 5	ARG; 3	ITA; 2	GRC; 4									3rd	99	1st	212
2007	Ford Focus RS WRC 07	4	(Finland) Mikko Hirvonen									FIN; 2	GER; 3	NZL; 3	ESP; 4	FRA; 13	JPN; 1	IRE; 4	GBR; 1	3rd	99	1st	212
2007	Ford Focus RS WRC 07	17	(United Arab Emirates) Khalid Al Qassimi	MON	SWE	NOR	MEX	POR	ARG	ITA	GRE	FIN; 16	GER; 16	NZL	ESP; 14	FRA	JPN	IRE; 15	GBR	–	0	1st	212
2008	Ford Focus RS WRC 07	3	(Finland) Mikko Hirvonen	MON; 2	SWE; 2	MEX; 4	ARG; 5	JOR; 1	ITA; 2	GRC; 3	TUR; 1	FIN; 2								2nd	103	2nd	183
2008	Ford Focus RS WRC 08	3	(Finland) Mikko Hirvonen										GER; 4	NZL; 3	ESP; 3	FRA; 2	JPN; 1	GBR; 8		2nd	103	2nd	183
2008	Ford Focus RS WRC 07	3	(Finland) Jari-Matti Latvala	MON; 12	SWE; 1	MEX; 3	ARG; 15	JOR; 7	ITA; 3	GRE; 7	TUR; 2	FIN; 38								4th	58	2nd	183
2008	Ford Focus RS WRC 08	3	(Finland) Jari-Matti Latvala										GER; 9	NZL; Ret			JPN; 2	GBR; 2		4th	58	2nd	183
2008	Ford Focus RS WRC 08	3	(Belgium) François Duval												ESP; 4	FRA; 3				7th	25	2nd	183
2008	Ford Focus RS WRC 07	19	(United Arab Emirates) Khalid Al Qassimi	MON; 16	SWE; 26	MEX	ARG	JOR; 9	ITA; 16	GRE; 12	TUR	FIN; 11								–	0	2nd	183
2008	Ford Focus RS WRC 08	19	(United Arab Emirates) Khalid Al Qassimi										GER; 14	NZL	ESP; 21	FRA; 12	JPN	GBR; 16		–	0	2nd	183
2009	Ford Focus RS WRC 08	3	(Finland) Mikko Hirvonen	IRE; 3	NOR; 2	CYP; 2	POR; 2	ARG; Ret												2nd	92	2nd	140
2009	Ford Focus RS WRC 09	3	(Finland) Mikko Hirvonen						ITA; 2	GRE; 1	POL; 1	FIN; 1	AUS; 1	ESP; 3	GBR; 2					2nd	92	2nd	140
2009	Ford Focus RS WRC 08	4	(Finland) Jari-Matti Latvala	IRE; 14	NOR; 3	CYP; 12	POR; Ret	ARG; 6												4th	41	2nd	140
2009	Ford Focus RS WRC 09	4	(Finland) Jari-Matti Latvala						ITA; 1	GRE; 3	POL; Ret	FIN; 3	AUS; 4	ESP; 6	GBR; 7					4th	41	2nd	140
2009	Ford Focus RS WRC 08	15	(United Arab Emirates) Khalid Al Qassimi	IRE; 8	NOR	CYP; 8	POR; 8	ARG	ITA; 15	GRE; 6	POL	FIN; 9	AUS; 19	ESP; 14	GBR; 19					12th	6	2nd	140
2010	Ford Focus RS WRC 09	3	(Finland) Mikko Hirvonen	SWE; 1	MEX; 4	JOR; 20	TUR; 3	NZL; 4	POR; 4	BUL; 5	FIN; Ret	GER; Ret	JPN; 6	FRA; 5	ESP; 5	GBR; 4				6th	126	2nd	337
2010	Ford Focus RS WRC 09	4	(Finland) Jari-Matti Latvala	SWE; 3	MEX; 5	JOR; 2	TUR; 8	NZL; 1	POR; Ret	BUL; 6	FIN; 1	GER; 4	JPN; 3	FRA; 4	ESP; 4	GBR; 3				2nd	171	2nd	337
2010	Ford Focus RS WRC 08	12	(United Arab Emirates) Khalid Al Qassimi	SWE; 13	MEX	JOR	TUR	NZL	POR; 9	BUL	FIN; Ret	GER; 8	JPN; Ret	FRA; 13	ESP; 7	GBR; 11				12th	12	2nd	337
2011	Ford Fiesta RS WRC	3	(Finland) Mikko Hirvonen	SWE; 1	MEX; 2	POR; 4	JOR; 4	ITA; 2	ARG; 2	GRE; 3	FIN; 4	GER; 4	AUS; 1	FRA; 3	ESP; 2	GBR; Ret				2nd	214	2nd	376
2011	Ford Fiesta RS WRC	4	(Finland) Jari-Matti Latvala	SWE; 3	MEX; 3	POR; 3	JOR; 2	ITA; 18	ARG; 7	GRE; 9	FIN; 2	GER; 14	AUS; 2	FRA; 4	ESP; 3	GBR; 1				4th	172	2nd	376
2012	Ford Fiesta RS WRC	3	(Finland) Jari-Matti Latvala	MON; Ret	SWE; 1	MEX; Ret	POR; 13	ARG; Inj	GRE; 3	NZL; 7	FIN; 3	GER; 2	GBR; 1	FRA; 2	ITA; 12	ESP; 2				3rd	154	2nd	309
2012	Ford Fiesta RS WRC	3	(Spain) Dani Sordo					ARG; Ret												11th	35	2nd	309
2012	Ford Fiesta RS WRC	4	(Norway) Petter Solberg	MON; 3	SWE; 4	MEX; 3	POR; 3	ARG; 6	GRE; Ret	NZL; 3	FIN; 4	GER; 11	GBR; 3	FRA; 26	ITA; 9	ESP; 11				5th	124	2nd	309

== J-WRC results ==
Year	Entrant	Car	No	Driver	1	2	3	4	5	6	7	8	9	JWRC	Points
2001	Ford Motor Co	Ford Puma S1600	51	(France) Patrick Magaud	ESP; Ret	GRE; 5	FIN; Ret	ITA; 5	FRA	GBR; Ret				11th	4
2001	Ford Motor Co	Ford Puma S1600	55	(United Kingdom) Niall McShea	ESP; Ret	GRE; Ret	FIN	ITA	FRA	GBR				3rd*	12*
2001	Ford Motor Co	Ford Puma S1600	59	(France) Benoît Rousselot	ESP; Ret	GRE; Ret	FIN; Ret	ITA; 9	FRA; Ret	GBR; Ret				–	0
2001	Ford Motor Co	Ford Puma S1600	71	(Belgium) François Duval	ESP; Ret	GRE; Ret	FIN; Ret	ITA; 2	FRA; Ret	GBR; Ret				7th	6
2002	Ford Motor Co	Ford Puma S1600	55	(Belgium) François Duval	MON; 1	ESP; 6	GRE; Ret	GER; Ret	ITA; 6	GBR; Ret				6th	12
2002	Ford Motor Co	Ford Puma S1600	55	(Norway) Alexander Foss	MON; 7	ESP; Ret	GRE; 6	GER; Ret	ITA; 15	GBR; Ret				16th	1
2003	Ford Motor Co	Ford Puma S1600	55	(Norway) Martin Stenshorne	MON; Ret	TUR; Ret	GRE; Ret	FIN	ITA	ESP	GBR			–	0
2003	Ford Motor Co	Ford Puma S1600	70	(United Kingdom) Guy Wilks	MON; Ret	TUR; 3	GRE; 6	FIN; 3	ITA; 6	ESP; 11	GBR; Ret			7th	18
2006	M-Sport	Ford Fiesta S1600	43	(Estonia) Jaan Mölder	SWE; 10	ESP	FRA	ARG; 4	ITA	GER	FIN	TUR	GBR	9th*	18*
2006	Stobart VK M-Sport Ford Rally Team	Ford Fiesta ST	53	(United Kingdom) Barry Clark	SWE	ESP; Ret	FRA; 9	ARG	ITA; 15	GER; 10	FIN; 9	TUR	GBR; 4	18th	5
