= 2002 Rally Australia =

13th round of the 2002 World Rally Championship

2002 Rally Australia 15th Telstra Rally Australia
Round 13 of the 2002 World Rally Championship season
← Previous event	Next event →
- Host country: Australia
- Rally base: Perth
- Dates run: October 31, 2002 – November 3, 2002
- Stages: 24 (388.64 km; 241.49 miles)
- Stage surface: Gravel
- Overall distance: 1,571.98 km (976.78 miles)

Statistics
- Crews: 69 at start, 37 at finish

Overall results
- Overall winner: (Finland) Marcus Grönholm (Finland) Timo Rautiainen (France) Peugeot Total; Peugeot 206 WRC

The 2002 Rally Australia (formally the 15th Telstra Rally Australia) was the thirteenth round of the 2002 World Rally Championship. The race was held over four days between 31 October and 3 November 2002, and was won by Peugeot's Marcus Grönholm, his 12th win in the World Rally Championship.

== Background ==
=== Entry list ===
No.	Driver	Co-Driver	Entrant	Car	Tyre
World Rally Championship manufacturer entries
1	(United Kingdom) Richard Burns	(United Kingdom) Robert Reid	(France) Peugeot Total	Peugeot 206 WRC	MI
2	(Finland) Marcus Grönholm	(Finland) Timo Rautiainen	(France) Peugeot Total	Peugeot 206 WRC	MI
3	(Finland) Harri Rovanperä	(Finland) Voitto Silander	(France) Peugeot Total	Peugeot 206 WRC	MI
4	(Spain) Carlos Sainz	(Spain) Luis Moya	(United Kingdom) Ford Motor Co. Ltd.	Ford Focus RS WRC '02	P
5	(United Kingdom) Colin McRae	(United Kingdom) Derek Ringer	(United Kingdom) Ford Motor Co. Ltd.	Ford Focus RS WRC '02	P
6	(Estonia) Markko Märtin	(United Kingdom) Michael Park	(United Kingdom) Ford Motor Co. Ltd.	Ford Focus RS WRC '02	P
7	(France) François Delecour	(France) Daniel Grataloup	(Japan) Marlboro Mitsubishi Ralliart	Mitsubishi Lancer WRC2	MI
9	(Finland) Jani Paasonen	(Finland) Arto Kapanen	(Japan) Marlboro Mitsubishi Ralliart	Mitsubishi Lancer WRC2	MI
10	(Finland) Tommi Mäkinen	(Finland) Kaj Lindström	(Japan) 555 Subaru World Rally Team	Subaru Impreza S8 WRC '02	P
11	(Norway) Petter Solberg	(United Kingdom) Phil Mills	(Japan) 555 Subaru World Rally Team	Subaru Impreza S8 WRC '02	P
14	(Sweden) Kenneth Eriksson	(Sweden) Tina Thörner	(Czech Republic) Škoda Motorsport	Škoda Octavia WRC Evo3	MI
15	(Finland) Toni Gardemeister	(Finland) Paavo Lukander	(Czech Republic) Škoda Motorsport	Škoda Octavia WRC Evo3	MI
17	(Germany) Armin Schwarz	(Germany) Manfred Hiemer	(South Korea) Hyundai Castrol World Rally Team	Hyundai Accent WRC3	MI
18	(Belgium) Freddy Loix	(Belgium) Sven Smeets	(South Korea) Hyundai Castrol World Rally Team	Hyundai Accent WRC3	MI
19	(Finland) Juha Kankkunen	(Finland) Juha Repo	(South Korea) Hyundai Castrol World Rally Team	Hyundai Accent WRC3	MI
World Rally Championship entries
24	(Belgium) François Duval	(Belgium) Jean-Marc Fortin	(United Kingdom) Ford Motor Co. Ltd.	Ford Focus RS WRC '02	P
25	(France) Sébastien Loeb	(Monaco) Daniel Elena	(France) Piedrafita Sport	Citroën Xsara WRC	MI
32	(Poland) Tomasz Kuchar	(Poland) Maciej Szczepaniak	(Poland) Tomasz Kuchar	Toyota Corolla WRC	MI
104	(United Kingdom) Natalie Barratt	(United Kingdom) Roger Freeman	(United Kingdom) Natalie Barratt Rallysport	Hyundai Accent WRC	—N/a
114	(Australia) Mark Pedder	(Australia) Toni Feaver	(Australia) Pedders Suspension	Mitsubishi Lancer Evo III	—N/a
118	(Australia) Tolley Challis	(Australia) Karl Francis	(Australia) Racetech Seats	Mitsubishi Lancer Evo V	—N/a
122	(Australia) Michael Thompson	(Australia) Gordon Klebba	(Australia) Michael Thompson	Subaru Impreza STI N8	—N/a
125	(Australia) Craig Bignell	(Australia) Joan Percival	(Australia) Craig Bignell	Mitsubishi Lancer Evo III	—N/a
132	(Australia) Robert Whyatt	(Australia) Malcolm Cox	(Australia) Robert Whyatt	Mitsubishi Lancer Evo III	—N/a
137	(Australia) David Kendall	(Australia) Jennifer Kendall-Stewart	(Australia) David Kendall	Mitsubishi Lancer Evo IV	—N/a
PWRC entries
52	(Argentina) Marcos Ligato	(Argentina) Rubén García	(Italy) Top Run SRL	Mitsubishi Lancer Evo VII	—N/a
53	(Italy) Alessandro Fiorio	(Italy) Enrico Cantoni	(Italy) Ralliart Italia	Mitsubishi Lancer Evo VII	—N/a
54	(Peru) Ramón Ferreyros	(Argentina) Jorge Del Buono	(Italy) Mauro Rally Tuning	Mitsubishi Lancer Evo VII	—N/a
57	(Japan) Toshihiro Arai	(New Zealand) Tony Sircombe	(Japan) Spike Subaru Team	Subaru Impreza STI N8	—N/a
65	(Austria) Beppo Harrach	(Austria) Peter Müller	(Austria) Stohl Racing	Mitsubishi Lancer Evo VI	—N/a
69	(Norway) Bernt Kollevold	(Norway) Ola Fløene	(Norway) Kollevold Rally Team	Mitsubishi Lancer Evo VII	—N/a
70	(Italy) Giovanni Manfrinato	(Italy) Claudio Condotta	(Italy) Top Run SRL	Mitsubishi Lancer Evo VI	—N/a
71	(Italy) Stefano Marrini	(Italy) Tiziana Sandroni	(Italy) Top Run SRL	Mitsubishi Lancer Evo VII	—N/a
73	(United Kingdom) Martin Rowe	(United Kingdom) Chris Wood	(United Kingdom) David Sutton Cars Ltd	Mitsubishi Lancer Evo VII	—N/a
74	(Malaysia) Karamjit Singh	(Malaysia) Allen Oh	(Malaysia) Petronas EON Racing Team	Proton Pert	—N/a
75	(Finland) Kristian Sohlberg	(Finland) Jakke Honkanen	(Finland) Blue Rose Team	Mitsubishi Lancer Evo VII	MI
77	(Italy) Alfredo De Dominicis	(Italy) Nicola Arena	Ralliart Italy	Mitsubishi Lancer Evo VI	—N/a

=== Itinerary ===
All dates and times are AWST (UTC+8).

Date	Time	No.	Stage name	Distance
Leg 1 — 135.68 km
31 October	18:42	SS1	Langley Park Super 1	2.20 km
1 November	09:43	SS2	Harvey Weir	6.97 km
1 November	10:06	SS3	Stirling West	15.89 km
1 November	11:01	SS4	Murray River 1	20.44 km
1 November	13:00	SS5	Brunswick	16.63 km
1 November	13:34	SS6	Stirling East	38.93 km
1 November	15:53	SS7	Murray Pines South	11.98 km
1 November	16:12	SS8	Murray River 2	20.44 km
1 November	19:29	SS9	Langley Park Super 2	2.20 km
Leg 2 — 147.27 km
2 November	08:41	SS10	Kevs	9.56 km
2 November	09:20	SS11	Beraking	26.46 km
2 November	10:11	SS12	Helena South 1	18.43 km
2 November	12:29	SS13	York Railway	5.30 km
2 November	13:03	SS14	Muresk 1	6.81 km
2 November	13:14	SS15	Muresk 2	6.81 km
2 November	14:41	SS16	Flynns Short	19.98 km
2 November	16:05	SS17	Helena North	28.87 km
2 November	16:38	SS18	Helena South 2	18.43 km
2 November	17:03	SS19	Atkins	4.42 km
2 November	19:49	SS20	Langley Park Super 3	2.20 km
Leg 3 — 105.69 km
3 November	09:00	SS21	Bannister Central	5.63 km
3 November	09:18	SS22	Bannister South	28.65 km
3 November	11:32	SS23	Bannister West	34.57 km
3 November	12:40	SS24	Bannister North	36.84 km

== Results ==
=== Overall ===
Pos.	No.	Driver	Co-driver	Team	Car	Time	Difference	Points
1	2	(Finland) Marcus Grönholm	(Finland) Timo Rautiainen	(France) Peugeot Total	Peugeot 206 WRC	3:35:56.5		10
2	3	(Finland) Harri Rovanperä	(Finland) Voitto Silander	(France) Peugeot Total	Peugeot 206 WRC	3:36:53.8	+57.3	6
3	11	(Norway) Petter Solberg	(United Kingdom) Phil Mills	(Japan) 555 Subaru World Rally Team	Subaru Impreza S8 WRC '02	3:37:25.2	+1:28.7	4
4	4	(Spain) Carlos Sainz	(Spain) Luis Moya	(United Kingdom) Ford Motor Co. Ltd.	Ford Focus RS WRC '02	3:39:05.5	+3:09.0	3
5	6	(Estonia) Markko Märtin	(United Kingdom) Michael Park	(United Kingdom) Ford Motor Co. Ltd.	Ford Focus RS WRC '02	3:42:18.0	+6:21.5	2
6	15	(Finland) Toni Gardemeister	(Finland) Paavo Lukander	(Czech Republic) Škoda Motorsport	Škoda Octavia WRC Evo3	3:43:08.1	+7:11.6	1

=== World Rally Cars ===
==== Classification ====
Position		No.	Driver	Co-driver	Entrant	Car	Time	Difference	Points
Event	Class	No.	Driver	Co-driver	Entrant	Car	Time	Difference	Points
1	1	2	(Finland) Marcus Grönholm	(Finland) Timo Rautiainen	(France) Peugeot Total	Peugeot 206 WRC	3:35:56.5		10
2	2	3	(Finland) Harri Rovanperä	(Finland) Voitto Silander	(France) Peugeot Total	Peugeot 206 WRC	3:36:53.8	+57.3	6
3	3	11	(Norway) Petter Solberg	(United Kingdom) Phil Mills	(Japan) 555 Subaru World Rally Team	Subaru Impreza S8 WRC '02	3:37:25.2	+1:28.7	4
4	4	4	(Spain) Carlos Sainz	(Spain) Luis Moya	(United Kingdom) Ford Motor Co. Ltd.	Ford Focus RS WRC '02	3:39:05.5	+3:09.0	3
5	5	6	(Estonia) Markko Märtin	(United Kingdom) Michael Park	(United Kingdom) Ford Motor Co. Ltd.	Ford Focus RS WRC '02	3:42:18.0	+6:21.5	2
6	6	15	(Finland) Toni Gardemeister	(Finland) Paavo Lukander	(Czech Republic) Škoda Motorsport	Škoda Octavia WRC Evo3	3:43:08.1	+7:11.6	1
8	7	14	(Sweden) Kenneth Eriksson	(Sweden) Tina Thörner	(Czech Republic) Škoda Motorsport	Škoda Octavia WRC Evo3	3:48:42.9	+12:46.4	0
9	8	9	(Finland) Jani Paasonen	(Finland) Arto Kapanen	(Japan) Marlboro Mitsubishi Ralliart	Mitsubishi Lancer WRC2	3:49:22.0	+13:25.5	0
Retired SS24		10	(Finland) Tommi Mäkinen	(Finland) Kaj Lindström	(Japan) 555 Subaru World Rally Team	Subaru Impreza S8 WRC '02	Excluded - car weight		0
Retired SS24		19	(Finland) Juha Kankkunen	(Finland) Juha Repo	(South Korea) Hyundai Castrol World Rally Team	Hyundai Accent WRC3	Engine		0
Retired SS15		5	(United Kingdom) Colin McRae	(United Kingdom) Derek Ringer	(United Kingdom) Ford Motor Co. Ltd.	Ford Focus RS WRC '02	Radiator		0
Retired SS8		17	(Germany) Armin Schwarz	(Germany) Manfred Hiemer	(South Korea) Hyundai Castrol World Rally Team	Hyundai Accent WRC3	Engine		0
Retired SS7		1	(United Kingdom) Richard Burns	(United Kingdom) Robert Reid	(France) Peugeot Total	Peugeot 206 WRC	Clutch		0
Retired SS7		7	(France) François Delecour	(France) Daniel Grataloup	(Japan) Marlboro Mitsubishi Ralliart	Mitsubishi Lancer WRC2	Accident		0
Retired SS6		18	(Belgium) Freddy Loix	(Belgium) Sven Smeets	(South Korea) Hyundai Castrol World Rally Team	Hyundai Accent WRC3	Accident		0

==== Special stages ====
Day	Stage	Stage name	Length	Winner	Car	Time	Class leaders
Leg 1 (31 Oct)	SS1	Langley Park Super 1	2.20 km	(Norway) Petter Solberg	Subaru Impreza S8 WRC '02	1:28.7	(Norway) Petter Solberg
Leg 1 (1 Nov)	SS2	Harvey Weir	6.97 km	(Belgium) Freddy Loix	Hyundai Accent WRC3	4:00.7	(Norway) Petter Solberg
Leg 1 (1 Nov)	SS3	Stirling West	15.89 km	(Finland) Marcus Grönholm	Peugeot 206 WRC	9:19.9	(Finland) Marcus Grönholm
Leg 1 (1 Nov)	SS4	Murray River 1	20.44 km	(Finland) Marcus Grönholm	Peugeot 206 WRC	12:15.0	(Finland) Marcus Grönholm
Leg 1 (1 Nov)	SS5	Brunswick	16.63 km	(Finland) Marcus Grönholm	Peugeot 206 WRC	9:08.7	(Finland) Marcus Grönholm
Leg 1 (1 Nov)	SS6	Stirling East	38.93 km	(Finland) Marcus Grönholm	Peugeot 206 WRC	22:44.9	(Finland) Marcus Grönholm
Leg 1 (1 Nov)	SS7	Murray Pines South	11.98 km	(Finland) Marcus Grönholm	Peugeot 206 WRC	6:29.5	(Finland) Marcus Grönholm
Leg 1 (1 Nov)	SS8	Murray River 2	20.44 km	(Finland) Marcus Grönholm	Peugeot 206 WRC	11:47.8	(Finland) Marcus Grönholm
Leg 1 (1 Nov)	SS9	Langley Park Super 2	2.20 km	(Finland) Harri Rovanperä	Peugeot 206 WRC	1:28.3	(Finland) Marcus Grönholm
Leg 2 (2 Nov)	SS10	Kevs	9.56 km	(Norway) Petter Solberg	Subaru Impreza S8 WRC '02	5:51.8	(Finland) Marcus Grönholm
Leg 2 (2 Nov)	SS11	Beraking	26.46 km	(Finland) Harri Rovanperä	Peugeot 206 WRC	14:23.3	(Finland) Marcus Grönholm
Leg 2 (2 Nov)	SS12	Helena South 1	18.43 km	(Finland) Harri Rovanperä	Peugeot 206 WRC	9:28.9	(Finland) Marcus Grönholm
Leg 2 (2 Nov)	SS13	York Railway	5.30 km	(Finland) Harri Rovanperä (United Kingdom) Colin McRae	Peugeot 206 WRC; Ford Focus RS WRC '02	2:32.3	(Finland) Marcus Grönholm
Leg 2 (2 Nov)	SS14	Muresk 1	6.81 km	(Finland) Tommi Mäkinen	Subaru Impreza S8 WRC '02	3:24.9	(Finland) Marcus Grönholm
Leg 2 (2 Nov)	SS15	Muresk 2	6.81 km	(Finland) Harri Rovanperä (Spain) Carlos Sainz	Peugeot 206 WRC; Ford Focus RS WRC '02	3:24.0	(Finland) Marcus Grönholm
Leg 2 (2 Nov)	SS16	Flynns Short	19.98 km	(Finland) Marcus Grönholm	Peugeot 206 WRC	11:33.8	(Finland) Marcus Grönholm
Leg 2 (2 Nov)	SS17	Helena North	28.87 km	(Finland) Marcus Grönholm	Peugeot 206 WRC	16:20.7	(Finland) Marcus Grönholm
Leg 2 (2 Nov)	SS18	Helena South 2	18.43 km	(Finland) Marcus Grönholm	Peugeot 206 WRC	9:20.7	(Finland) Marcus Grönholm
Leg 2 (2 Nov)	SS19	Atkins	4.42 km	(Finland) Marcus Grönholm	Peugeot 206 WRC	2:58.2	(Finland) Marcus Grönholm
Leg 2 (2 Nov)	SS20	Langley Park Super 3	2.20 km	(Norway) Petter Solberg	Subaru Impreza S8 WRC '02	1:27.6	(Finland) Marcus Grönholm
Leg 3 (3 Nov)	SS21	Bannister Central	5.63 km	(Finland) Harri Rovanperä	Peugeot 206 WRC	3:22.4	(Finland) Marcus Grönholm
Leg 3 (3 Nov)	SS22	Bannister South	28.65 km	(Finland) Harri Rovanperä	Peugeot 206 WRC	16:07.3	(Finland) Marcus Grönholm
Leg 3 (3 Nov)	SS23	Bannister West	34.57 km	(Finland) Harri Rovanperä	Peugeot 206 WRC	17:09.2	(Finland) Marcus Grönholm
Leg 3 (3 Nov)	SS24	Bannister North	36.84 km	(Finland) Marcus Grönholm	Peugeot 206 WRC	19:15.7	(Finland) Marcus Grönholm

==== Championship standings ====
- **Bold text** indicates 2002 World Champions.

Pos.	Drivers' championships			Co-drivers' championships			Manufacturers' championships		
Pos.	Move	Driver	Points	Move	Co-driver	Points	Move	Manufacturer	Points
1		(Finland) **Marcus Grönholm**	77		(Finland) **Timo Rautiainen**	77		(France) **Peugeot Total**	163
2		(United Kingdom) Richard Burns	34		(United Kingdom) Robert Reid	34		(United Kingdom) Ford Motor Co. Ltd.	94
3		(United Kingdom) Colin McRae	33		(United Kingdom) Nicky Grist	33		(Japan) 555 Subaru World Rally Team	54
4	1	(Spain) Carlos Sainz	32	1	(Spain) Luis Moya	32	2	(Czech Republic) Škoda Motorsport	9
5	1	(France) Gilles Panizzi	31	1	(France) Hervé Panizzi	31	1	(Japan) Marlboro Mitsubishi Ralliart	9

=== Production World Rally Championship ===
==== Classification ====
Position		No.	Driver	Co-driver	Entrant	Car	Time	Difference	Points
Event	Class	No.	Driver	Co-driver	Entrant	Car	Time	Difference	Points
14	1	57	(Japan) Toshihiro Arai	(New Zealand) Tony Sircombe	(Japan) Spike Subaru Team	Subaru Impreza STI N8	3:58:09.5		10
17	2	53	(Italy) Alessandro Fiorio	(Italy) Enrico Cantoni	(Italy) Ralliart Italia	Mitsubishi Lancer Evo VII	3:59:52.7	+1:43.2	6
18	3	74	(Malaysia) Karamjit Singh	(Malaysia) Allen Oh	(Malaysia) Petronas EON Racing Team	Proton Pert	4:00:06.4	+1:56.9	4
20	4	54	(Peru) Ramón Ferreyros	(Argentina) Jorge Del Buono	(Italy) Mauro Rally Tuning	Mitsubishi Lancer Evo VII	4:00:23.9	+2:14.4	3
21	5	73	(United Kingdom) Martin Rowe	(United Kingdom) Chris Wood	(United Kingdom) David Sutton Cars Ltd	Mitsubishi Lancer Evo VII	4:01:45.1	+3:35.6	2
23	6	69	(Norway) Bernt Kollevold	(Norway) Ola Fløene	(Norway) Kollevold Rally Team	Mitsubishi Lancer Evo VII	4:11:10.0	+13:00.5	1
24	7	77	(Italy) Alfredo De Dominicis	(Italy) Nicola Arena	Ralliart Italy	Mitsubishi Lancer Evo VI	4:11:24.9	+13:15.4	0
36	8	71	(Italy) Stefano Marrini	(Italy) Tiziana Sandroni	(Italy) Top Run SRL	Mitsubishi Lancer Evo VII	4:53:00.0	+54:50.5	0
Retired SS14		75	(Finland) Kristian Sohlberg	(Finland) Jakke Honkanen	(Finland) Blue Rose Team	Mitsubishi Lancer Evo VII	Suspension		0
Retired SS6		65	(Austria) Beppo Harrach	(Austria) Peter Müller	(Austria) Stohl Racing	Mitsubishi Lancer Evo VI	Turbo		0
Retired SS5		52	(Argentina) Marcos Ligato	(Argentina) Rubén García	(Italy) Top Run SRL	Mitsubishi Lancer Evo VII	Gearbox		0
Retired SS4		70	(Italy) Giovanni Manfrinato	(Italy) Claudio Condotta	(Italy) Top Run SRL	Mitsubishi Lancer Evo VI	Suspension		0

==== Special stages ====
Day	Stage	Stage name	Length	Winner	Car	Time	Class leaders
Leg 1 (31 Oct)	SS1	Langley Park Super 1	2.20 km	(Japan) Toshihiro Arai	Subaru Impreza STI N8	1:36.4	(Japan) Toshihiro Arai
Leg 1 (1 Nov)	SS2	Harvey Weir	6.97 km	(Argentina) Marcos Ligato	Mitsubishi Lancer Evo VII	4:13.0	(Argentina) Marcos Ligato
Leg 1 (1 Nov)	SS3	Stirling West	15.89 km	(Finland) Kristian Sohlberg	Mitsubishi Lancer Evo VII	10:10.2	(Malaysia) Karamjit Singh (Finland) Kristian Sohlberg
Leg 1 (1 Nov)	SS4	Murray River 1	20.44 km	(Argentina) Marcos Ligato	Mitsubishi Lancer Evo VII	13:10.6	(Argentina) Marcos Ligato
Leg 1 (1 Nov)	SS5	Brunswick	16.63 km	(Japan) Toshihiro Arai	Subaru Impreza STI N8	10:07.7	(Finland) Kristian Sohlberg
Leg 1 (1 Nov)	SS6	Stirling East	38.93 km	(United Kingdom) Martin Rowe	Mitsubishi Lancer Evo VII	24:36.8	(Japan) Toshihiro Arai
Leg 1 (1 Nov)	SS7	Murray Pines South	11.98 km	Notional stage time			(Japan) Toshihiro Arai
Leg 1 (1 Nov)	SS8	Murray River 2	20.44 km	(Malaysia) Karamjit Singh	Proton Pert	12:56.0	(Malaysia) Karamjit Singh
Leg 1 (1 Nov)	SS9	Langley Park Super 2	2.20 km	(United Kingdom) Martin Rowe	Mitsubishi Lancer Evo VII	1:37.5	(Malaysia) Karamjit Singh
Leg 2 (2 Nov)	SS10	Kevs	9.56 km	(United Kingdom) Martin Rowe	Mitsubishi Lancer Evo VII	6:24.6	(Malaysia) Karamjit Singh
Leg 2 (2 Nov)	SS11	Beraking	26.46 km	(Japan) Toshihiro Arai	Subaru Impreza STI N8	15:50.5	(Malaysia) Karamjit Singh
Leg 2 (2 Nov)	SS12	Helena South 1	18.43 km	(Japan) Toshihiro Arai	Subaru Impreza STI N8	10:18.2	(Italy) Alessandro Fiorio
Leg 2 (2 Nov)	SS13	York Railway	5.30 km	(Finland) Kristian Sohlberg	Mitsubishi Lancer Evo VII	2:49.4	(Italy) Alessandro Fiorio
Leg 2 (2 Nov)	SS14	Muresk 1	6.81 km	(Japan) Toshihiro Arai	Subaru Impreza STI N8	3:53.3	(Italy) Alessandro Fiorio
Leg 2 (2 Nov)	SS15	Muresk 2	6.81 km	(Japan) Toshihiro Arai	Subaru Impreza STI N8	3:49.8	(Japan) Toshihiro Arai
Leg 2 (2 Nov)	SS16	Flynns Short	19.98 km	(Japan) Toshihiro Arai	Subaru Impreza STI N8	12:31.2	(Japan) Toshihiro Arai
Leg 2 (2 Nov)	SS17	Helena North	28.87 km	(Japan) Toshihiro Arai	Subaru Impreza STI N8	17:54.5	(Japan) Toshihiro Arai
Leg 2 (2 Nov)	SS18	Helena South 2	18.43 km	(Japan) Toshihiro Arai	Subaru Impreza STI N8	10:11.8	(Japan) Toshihiro Arai
Leg 2 (2 Nov)	SS19	Atkins	4.42 km	(Japan) Toshihiro Arai	Subaru Impreza STI N8	3:10.7	(Japan) Toshihiro Arai
Leg 2 (2 Nov)	SS20	Langley Park Super 3	2.20 km	(Italy) Alessandro Fiorio (Japan) Toshihiro Arai	Mitsubishi Lancer Evo VII; Subaru Impreza STI N8	1:34.7	(Japan) Toshihiro Arai
Leg 3 (3 Nov)	SS21	Bannister Central	5.63 km	(Japan) Toshihiro Arai	Subaru Impreza STI N8	3:44.2	(Japan) Toshihiro Arai
Leg 3 (3 Nov)	SS22	Bannister South	28.65 km	(Japan) Toshihiro Arai	Subaru Impreza STI N8	18:04.0	(Japan) Toshihiro Arai
Leg 3 (3 Nov)	SS23	Bannister West	34.57 km	(United Kingdom) Martin Rowe	Mitsubishi Lancer Evo VII	19:12.5	(Japan) Toshihiro Arai
Leg 3 (3 Nov)	SS24	Bannister North	36.84 km	(Japan) Toshihiro Arai	Subaru Impreza STI N8	21:30.9	(Japan) Toshihiro Arai

==== Championship standings ====
- **Bold text** indicates 2002 World Champions.

Pos.	Drivers' championships		
Pos.	Move	Driver	Points
1		(Malaysia) **Karamjit Singh**	32
2	1	(Finland) Kristian Sohlberg	26
3		(Peru) Ramón Ferreyros	23
4	1	(Japan) Toshihiro Arai	22
5	1	(Italy) Alessandro Fiorio	22
