= Derek Ringer =

British rally co-driver (born 1956)

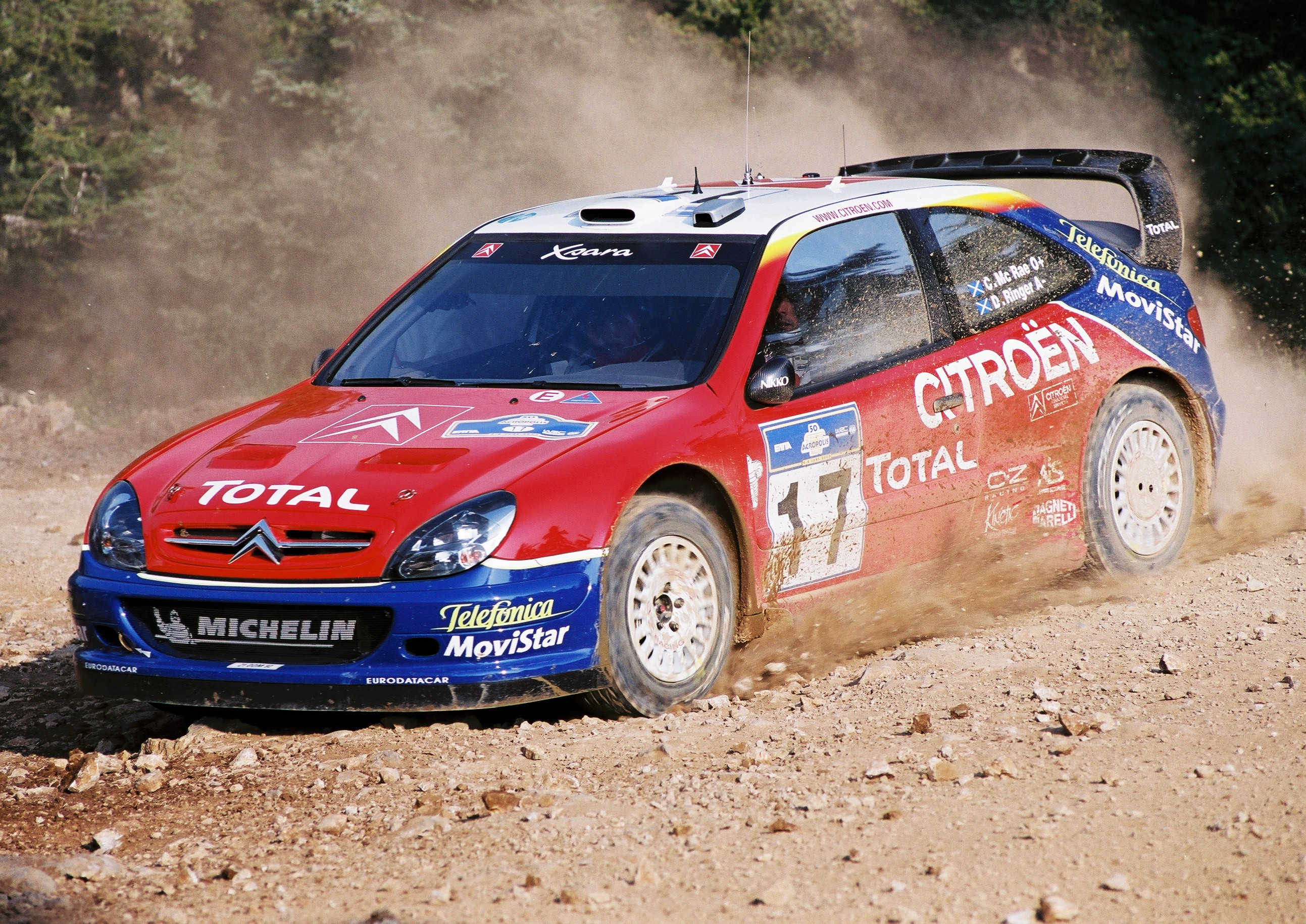
- Ringer and Colin McRae competing in the 2003 Acropolis Rally

Personal information
- Nationality: (United Kingdom) British
- Born: 11 October 1956 (age 70); Glasgow, Scotland

World Rally Championship record
- Years active: 1987–1996, 1998–2003, 2008
- Driver: (United Kingdom) Colin McRae (United Kingdom) Martin Rowe (Japan) Katsuhiko Taguchi (United States) Travis Pastrana
- Teams: Subaru, Ford, Citroën
- Rallies: 74
- Co-championships: 1 (1995)
- Rally wins: 8
- Podiums: 15
- Stage wins: 228
- First rally: 1987 RAC Rally
- First win: 1993 Rally New Zealand
- Last win: 1996 Rally de Catalunya
- Last rally: 2008 Acropolis Rally

Derek Ringer (born 11 October 1956) is a British rally co-driver from Scotland. He is most closely associated with Colin McRae, with whom he won the 1995 World Rally Championship.

Although their partnership extended back to the 1980s when McRae was a teenager, the two split at the end of 1996 when they failed to defend their title, several mid-season crashes being blamed on Ringer. After a year's absence, Ringer returned to partner Martin Rowe in the British Rally Championship, the pair winning the 1998 title in a Renault Mégane Maxi and competing together in the World Rally Championship in 1999.

Ringer then moved on to Mitsubishi for two years, before McRae's split with replacement co-driver Nicky Grist in 2002 reunited the two Scots for 2003. However, the partnership did not yield fresh success and both men lost their seats at Citroën. McRae competed in only three more world rallies, partnered by Nicky Grist on each occasion.

In February 2008, Ringer served as Travis Pastrana's interim co-driver beginning with the second-round, 100 Acre Wood event on 22 February. Pastrana's former co-driver, Christian Edstrom announced his retirement from rallying after one race in January.

== Complete WRC results ==
Year	Entrant	Car	1	2	3	4	5	6	7	8	9	10	11	12	13	14	15	16	WDC	Pts
1987	British Junior Rally Team	Vauxhall Nova Sport	MON	SWE	POR	KEN	FRA	GRE	USA	NZL	ARG	FIN	CIV	ITA	GBR; Ret				NC	0
1988	Peugeot Talbot Sport	Peugeot 205 GTI	MON	SWE	POR	KEN	FRA	GRC	USA	NZL	ARG	FIN	CIV	ITA	GBR; Ret				NC	0
1989	Mike Little Preparations	Ford Sierra XR 4x4	SWE; 15	MON	POR	KEN	FRA	GRC											34th	8
1989	Gary Smith Motorsport	Ford Sierra RS Cosworth							NZL; 5	ARG	FIN	AUS	ITA	CIV					34th	8
1989	R.E.D	Ford Sierra RS Cosworth													GBR; Ret				34th	8
1990	Shell Oil UK	Ford Sierra RS Cosworth 4x4	MON	POR	KEN	FRA	GRC	NZL	ARG	FIN	AUS	ITA	CIV	GBR; 6					34th	6
1991	Subaru Rally Team Europe	Subaru Legacy RS	MON	SWE	POR	KEN	FRA	GRE	NZL	ARG	FIN	AUS	ITA	CIV	ESP	GBR; Ret			NC	0
1992	Subaru Rally Team Europe	Subaru Legacy RS	MON	SWE; 2	POR	KEN	FRA	GRC; 4	NZL; Ret	ARG	FIN; 8	AUS	ITA	CIV	ESP	GBR; 6			8th	34
1993	555 Subaru World Rally Team	Subaru Legacy RS	MON	SWE; 3	POR; 7		FRA; 5	GRC; Ret	ARG	NZL; 1	FIN	AUS; 6	ITA	ESP					5th	50
1993	555 Subaru World Rally Team	Subaru Impreza 555													GBR; Ret				5th	50
1993	Subaru M.S.G.	Subaru Vivio 4WD				KEN; Ret													5th	50
1994	555 Subaru World Rally Team	Subaru Impreza 555	MON; 10	POR; Ret	KEN	FRA; Ret	GRC; DSQ	ARG; Ret	NZL; 1	FIN	ITA; 7	GBR; 1							4th	49
1995	555 Subaru World Rally Team	Subaru Impreza 555	MON; Ret	SWE; Ret	POR; 3	FRA; 5	NZL; 1	AUS; 2	ESP; 2	GBR; 1									1st	90
1996	555 Subaru World Rally Team	Subaru Impreza 555	SWE; 3	KEN; 4	IDN; Ret	GRC; 1	ARG; Ret	FIN; Ret	AUS; 4	ITA; 1	ESP; 1								2nd	92
1998	Renault Dealer Rallying UK	Renault Mégane Maxi	MON	SWE	KEN	POR	ESP	FRA; 14	ARG	GRC	NZL	FIN	ITA; Ret	AUS	GBR; Ret				NC	0
1999	Renault Elf Dealer Rallying	Renault Mégane Maxi	MON	SWE	KEN	POR; 19	ESP	FRA; Ret	ARG	GRC	NZL	FIN; 19	CHN	ITA; 17	AUS; 10	GBR; 18			NC	0
2000	Team Advan Ralliart	Mitsubishi Lancer Evo VI	MON	SWE	KEN	POR	ESP	ARG	GRC	NZL; Ret	FIN	CYP	FRA	ITA	AUS	GBR			NC	0
2001	Marlboro Mitsubishi Ralliart	Mitsubishi Lancer Evo 6.5	MON	SWE	POR	ESP	ARG	CYP; Ret	GRC	KEN	FIN	NZL	ITA	FRA	AUS	GBR			NC	0
2002	Ford Motor Co Ltd.	Ford Focus RS WRC 02	MON	SWE	FRA	ESP	CYP	ARG	GRC	KEN	FIN	GER	ITA	NZL	AUS; Ret	GBR; 5			18th	2
2003	Citroën Total	Citroën Xsara WRC	MON; 2	SWE; 5	TUR; 4	NZL; Ret	ARG; Ret	GRC; 8	CYP; 4	GER; 4	FIN; Ret	AUS; 4	ITA; 6	FRA; 5	ESP; 9	GBR; 4			7th	45
2008	Subaru Rally Team USA	Subaru Impreza STi N12	MON	SWE	MEX	ARG; Ret	JOR	ITA	GRE; 29	TUR	FIN	GER	NZL	ESP	FRA	JPN	GBR		NC	0
