= 2003 Rally Australia =

10th round of the 2003 World Rally Championship

2003 Rally Australia 16th Telstra Rally Australia
Round 10 of the 2003 World Rally Championship season
← Previous event	Next event →
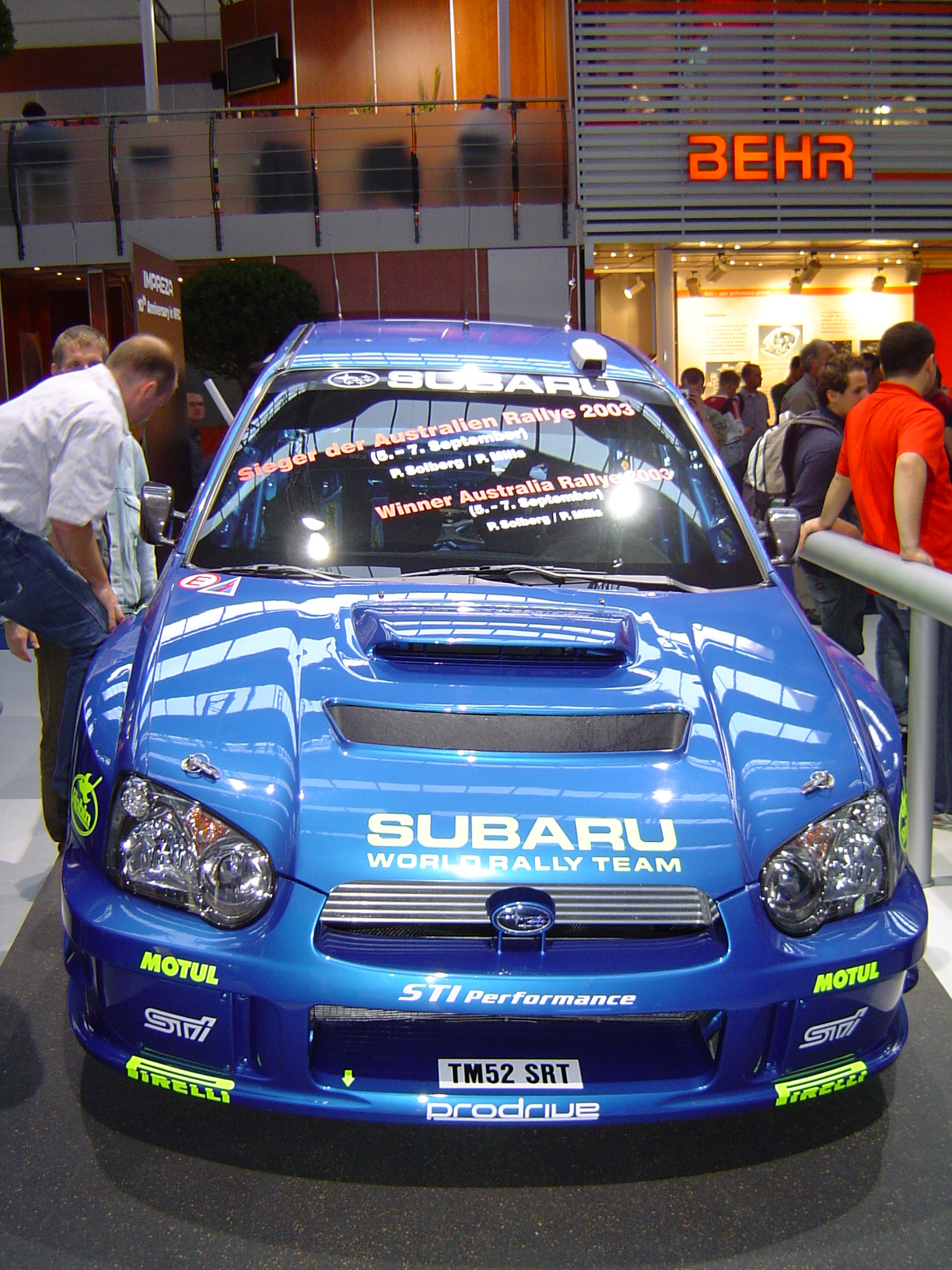
- Host country: Australia
- Rally base: Perth
- Dates run: September 4, 2003 – September 7, 2003
- Stages: 24 (386.31 km; 240.04 miles)
- Stage surface: Gravel
- Overall distance: 1,795.16 km (1,115.46 miles)

Statistics
- Crews: 49 at start, 32 at finish

Overall results
- Overall winner: (Norway) Petter Solberg (United Kingdom) Phil Mills (Japan) 555 Subaru World Rally Team; Subaru Impreza S9 WRC '03

The 2003 Rally Australia (formally the 16th Telstra Rally Australia) was the tenth round of the 2003 World Rally Championship. The race was held over four days from 4 to 7 September 2003, and was based in Perth, Australia. Subaru's Petter Solberg won the race, his 3rd win in the World Rally Championship.

== Background ==
=== Entry list ===
No.	Driver	Co-driver	Entrant	Car	Tyre
World Rally Championship manufacturer entries
1	(Finland) Marcus Grönholm	(Finland) Timo Rautiainen	(France) Marlboro Peugeot Total	Peugeot 206 WRC	MI
2	(United Kingdom) Richard Burns	(United Kingdom) Robert Reid	(France) Marlboro Peugeot Total	Peugeot 206 WRC	MI
3	(Finland) Harri Rovanperä	(Finland) Risto Pietiläinen	(France) Marlboro Peugeot Total	Peugeot 206 WRC	MI
4	(Estonia) Markko Märtin	(United Kingdom) Michael Park	(United Kingdom) Ford Motor Co. Ltd.	Ford Focus RS WRC '03	MI
5	(Belgium) François Duval	(Belgium) Stéphane Prévot	(United Kingdom) Ford Motor Co. Ltd.	Ford Focus RS WRC '03	MI
6	(Finland) Mikko Hirvonen	(Finland) Jarmo Lehtinen	(United Kingdom) Ford Motor Co. Ltd.	Ford Focus RS WRC '02	MI
7	(Norway) Petter Solberg	(United Kingdom) Phil Mills	(Japan) 555 Subaru World Rally Team	Subaru Impreza S9 WRC '03	P
8	(Finland) Tommi Mäkinen	(Finland) Kaj Lindström	(Japan) 555 Subaru World Rally Team	Subaru Impreza S9 WRC '03	P
10	(Germany) Armin Schwarz	(Germany) Manfred Hiemer	(South Korea) Hyundai World Rally Team	Hyundai Accent WRC3	MI
11	(Belgium) Freddy Loix	(Belgium) Sven Smeets	(South Korea) Hyundai World Rally Team	Hyundai Accent WRC3	MI
14	(France) Didier Auriol	(France) Denis Giraudet	(Czech Republic) Škoda Motorsport	Škoda Fabia WRC	MI
15	(Finland) Toni Gardemeister	(Finland) Paavo Lukander	(Czech Republic) Škoda Motorsport	Škoda Fabia WRC	MI
17	(United Kingdom) Colin McRae	(United Kingdom) Derek Ringer	(France) Citroën Total WRT	Citroën Xsara WRC	MI
18	(France) Sébastien Loeb	(Monaco) Daniel Elena	(France) Citroën Total WRT	Citroën Xsara WRC	MI
19	(Spain) Carlos Sainz	(Spain) Marc Martí	(France) Citroën Total WRT	Citroën Xsara WRC	MI
World Rally Championship entries
21	(Germany) Antony Warmbold	(United Kingdom) Gemma Price	(Germany) AW Rally Team	Ford Focus RS WRC '02	MI
24	(Hungary) Balázs Benik	(Hungary) Bence Rácz	(Hungary) Balázs Benik	Ford Focus RS WRC '02	—N/a
109	(Australia) Tolley Challis	(New Zealand) Daryll Judd	(Australia) Tolley Challis	Mitsubishi Lancer Evo V	—N/a
118	(Australia) David Kendall	(Australia) Jennifer Kendall-Stewart	(Australia) David Kendall	Mitsubishi Lancer Evo IV	—N/a
PWRC entries
51	(Malaysia) Karamjit Singh	(Malaysia) Allen Oh	(Malaysia) Petronas EON Racing Team	Proton Pert	—N/a
52	(Spain) Daniel Solà	(Spain) Álex Romaní	(Italy) Mauro Rally Tuning	Mitsubishi Lancer Evo VII	P
53	(Peru) Ramón Ferreyros	(Mexico) Javier Marín	(Italy) Mauro Rally Tuning	Mitsubishi Lancer Evo VI	—N/a
54	(Japan) Toshihiro Arai	(New Zealand) Tony Sircombe	(Japan) Subaru Production Rally Team	Subaru Impreza WRX STI N10	P
55	(United Kingdom) Martin Rowe	(United Kingdom) Trevor Agnew	(United Kingdom) David Sutton Cars Ltd	Subaru Impreza WRX STI N10	—N/a
58	(Argentina) Marcos Ligato	(Argentina) Rubén García	(Italy) Top Run SRL	Mitsubishi Lancer Evo VII	P
59	(Italy) Stefano Marrini	(Italy) Massimo Agostinelli	(Italy) Top Run SRL	Mitsubishi Lancer Evo VI	—N/a
60	(United Kingdom) Niall McShea	(United Kingdom) Chris Patterson	(New Zealand) Neil Allport Motorsports	Mitsubishi Lancer Evo VI	MI
64	(Sweden) Joakim Roman	(Sweden) Ragnar Spjuth	(Sweden) Milbrooks World Rally Team	Mitsubishi Lancer Evo VI	—N/a
65	(Sweden) Stig Blomqvist	(New Zealand) Rob Scott	(United Kingdom) David Sutton Cars Ltd	Subaru Impreza WRX STI N10	—N/a
72	(Romania) Constantin Aur	(Romania) Adrian Berghea	(Austria) Stohl Racing	Mitsubishi Lancer Evo VII	—N/a

=== Itinerary ===
All dates and times are AWST (UTC+8).

Date	Time	No.	Stage name	Distance
Leg 1 — 145.20 km
4 September	18:38	SS1	Perth City Super 1	2.45 km
5 September	08:19	SS2	Murray North 1	18.49 km
5 September	08:47	SS3	Murray South 1	20.12 km
5 September	09:45	SS4	Gobbys	5.20 km
5 September	12:12	SS5	Stirling West	15.89 km
5 September	12:44	SS6	Stirling Long	34.99 km
5 September	14:17	SS7	Turner Hill	7.00 km
5 September	16:43	SS8	Murray North 2	18.49 km
5 September	17:11	SS9	Murray South 2	20.12 km
5 September	20:32	SS10	Perth City Super 2	2.45 km
Leg 2 — 124.00 km
6 September	09:49	SS11	Beraking East	8.88 km
6 September	10:12	SS12	Helena East 1	20.49 km
6 September	10:45	SS13	Helena West 1	12.60 km
6 September	11:03	SS14	Helena South 1	17.31 km
6 September	14:12	SS15	Beraking West	9.42 km
6 September	14:35	SS16	Helena East 2	20.49 km
6 September	15:08	SS17	Helena West 2	12.60 km
6 September	15:26	SS18	Helena South 2	17.31 km
6 September	19:40	SS19	Perth City Super 3	2.45 km
6 September	19:50	SS20	Perth City Super 4	2.45 km
Leg 3 — 117.11 km
7 September	09:06	SS21	Bannister North	24.81 km
7 September	09:44	SS22	Bannister South	34.16 km
7 September	12:30	SS23	Bannister West	24.69 km
7 September	13:08	SS24	Bannister Central	33.45 km

== Results ==
=== Overall ===
Pos.	No.	Driver	Co-driver	Team	Car	Time	Difference	Points
1	7	(Norway) Petter Solberg	(United Kingdom) Phil Mills	(Japan) 555 Subaru World Rally Team	Subaru Impreza S9 WRC '03	3:32:07.1		10
2	18	(France) Sébastien Loeb	(Monaco) Daniel Elena	(France) Citroën Total WRT	Citroën Xsara WRC	3:32:33.7	+26.6	8
3	2	(United Kingdom) Richard Burns	(United Kingdom) Robert Reid	(France) Marlboro Peugeot Total	Peugeot 206 WRC	3:34:00.1	+1:53.0	6
4	17	(United Kingdom) Colin McRae	(United Kingdom) Derek Ringer	(France) Citroën Total WRT	Citroën Xsara WRC	3:34:37.8	+2:30.7	5
5	19	(Spain) Carlos Sainz	(Spain) Marc Martí	(France) Citroën Total WRT	Citroën Xsara WRC	3:34:44.3	+2:37.2	4
6	8	(Finland) Tommi Mäkinen	(Finland) Kaj Lindström	(Japan) 555 Subaru World Rally Team	Subaru Impreza S9 WRC '03	3:35:08.6	+3:01.5	3
7	3	(Finland) Harri Rovanperä	(Finland) Risto Pietiläinen	(France) Marlboro Peugeot Total	Peugeot 206 WRC	3:36:11.0	+4:03.9	2
8	11	(Belgium) Freddy Loix	(Belgium) Sven Smeets	(South Korea) Hyundai World Rally Team	Hyundai Accent WRC3	3:39:07.8	+7:00.7	1

=== World Rally Cars ===
==== Classification ====
Position		No.	Driver	Co-driver	Entrant	Car	Time	Difference	Points
Event	Class	No.	Driver	Co-driver	Entrant	Car	Time	Difference	Points
1	1	7	(Norway) Petter Solberg	(United Kingdom) Phil Mills	(Japan) 555 Subaru World Rally Team	Subaru Impreza S9 WRC '03	3:32:07.1		10
2	2	18	(France) Sébastien Loeb	(Monaco) Daniel Elena	(France) Citroën Total WRT	Citroën Xsara WRC	3:32:33.7	+26.6	8
3	3	2	(United Kingdom) Richard Burns	(United Kingdom) Robert Reid	(France) Marlboro Peugeot Total	Peugeot 206 WRC	3:34:00.1	+1:53.0	6
4	4	17	(United Kingdom) Colin McRae	(United Kingdom) Derek Ringer	(France) Citroën Total WRT	Citroën Xsara WRC	3:34:37.8	+2:30.7	5
5	5	19	(Spain) Carlos Sainz	(Spain) Marc Martí	(France) Citroën Total WRT	Citroën Xsara WRC	3:34:44.3	+2:37.2	4
6	6	8	(Finland) Tommi Mäkinen	(Finland) Kaj Lindström	(Japan) 555 Subaru World Rally Team	Subaru Impreza S9 WRC '03	3:35:08.6	+3:01.5	3
7	7	3	(Finland) Harri Rovanperä	(Finland) Risto Pietiläinen	(France) Marlboro Peugeot Total	Peugeot 206 WRC	3:36:11.0	+4:03.9	2
8	8	11	(Belgium) Freddy Loix	(Belgium) Sven Smeets	(South Korea) Hyundai World Rally Team	Hyundai Accent WRC3	3:39:07.8	+7:00.7	1
9	9	6	(Finland) Mikko Hirvonen	(Finland) Jarmo Lehtinen	(United Kingdom) Ford Motor Co. Ltd.	Ford Focus RS WRC '02	3:39:17.7	+7:10.6	0
10	10	5	(Belgium) François Duval	(Belgium) Stéphane Prévot	(United Kingdom) Ford Motor Co. Ltd.	Ford Focus RS WRC '03	3:39:53.3	+7:46.2	0
11	11	15	(Finland) Toni Gardemeister	(Finland) Paavo Lukander	(Czech Republic) Škoda Motorsport	Škoda Fabia WRC	3:42:17.3	+10:10.2	0
12	12	14	(France) Didier Auriol	(France) Denis Giraudet	(Czech Republic) Škoda Motorsport	Škoda Fabia WRC	3:43:15.2	+11:08.1	0
13	13	10	(Germany) Armin Schwarz	(Germany) Manfred Hiemer	(South Korea) Hyundai World Rally Team	Hyundai Accent WRC3	3:46:21.5	+14:14.4	0
Retired SS21		4	(Estonia) Markko Märtin	(United Kingdom) Michael Park	(United Kingdom) Ford Motor Co. Ltd.	Ford Focus RS WRC '03	Excluded		0
Retired SS10		1	(Finland) Marcus Grönholm	(Finland) Timo Rautiainen	(France) Marlboro Peugeot Total	Peugeot 206 WRC	Withdrawn		0

==== Special stages ====
Day	Stage	Stage name	Length	Winner	Car	Time	Class leaders
Leg 1 (4 Sep)	SS1	Perth City Super 1	2.45 km	(Norway) Petter Solberg	Subaru Impreza S9 WRC '03	1:31.9	(Norway) Petter Solberg
Leg 1 (5 Sep)	SS2	Murray North 1	18.49 km	(Finland) Marcus Grönholm	Peugeot 206 WRC	10:29.1	(Finland) Marcus Grönholm
Leg 1 (5 Sep)	SS3	Murray South 1	20.12 km	(Finland) Marcus Grönholm	Peugeot 206 WRC	11:51.8	(Finland) Marcus Grönholm
Leg 1 (5 Sep)	SS4	Gobbys	5.20 km	(Estonia) Markko Märtin	Ford Focus RS WRC '03	2:29.6	(Finland) Marcus Grönholm
Leg 1 (5 Sep)	SS5	Stirling West	15.89 km	(France) Sébastien Loeb	Citroën Xsara WRC	9:15.3	(Finland) Marcus Grönholm
Leg 1 (5 Sep)	SS6	Stirling Long	34.99 km	(France) Sébastien Loeb	Citroën Xsara WRC	20:02.1	(Finland) Marcus Grönholm
Leg 1 (5 Sep)	SS7	Turner Hill	7.00 km	(Norway) Petter Solberg	Subaru Impreza S9 WRC '03	4:22.4	(Finland) Marcus Grönholm
Leg 1 (5 Sep)	SS8	Murray North 2	18.49 km	(Norway) Petter Solberg (France) Sébastien Loeb	Subaru Impreza S9 WRC '03; Citroën Xsara WRC	10:14.4	(France) Sébastien Loeb
Leg 1 (5 Sep)	SS9	Murray South 2	20.12 km	(France) Sébastien Loeb	Citroën Xsara WRC	11:30.0	(France) Sébastien Loeb
Leg 1 (5 Sep)	SS10	Perth City Super 2	2.45 km	(Belgium) François Duval	Ford Focus RS WRC '03	1:33.5	(France) Sébastien Loeb
Leg 2 (6 Sep)	SS11	Beraking East	8.88 km	(Norway) Petter Solberg	Subaru Impreza S9 WRC '03	5:09.6	(France) Sébastien Loeb
Leg 2 (6 Sep)	SS12	Helena East 1	20.49 km	(Norway) Petter Solberg	Subaru Impreza S9 WRC '03	11:38.2	(France) Sébastien Loeb
Leg 2 (6 Sep)	SS13	Helena West 1	12.60 km	(France) Sébastien Loeb	Citroën Xsara WRC	7:18.4	(France) Sébastien Loeb
Leg 2 (6 Sep)	SS14	Helena South 1	17.31 km	(Norway) Petter Solberg	Subaru Impreza S9 WRC '03	8:55.3	(France) Sébastien Loeb
Leg 2 (6 Sep)	SS15	Beraking West	9.42 km	(Norway) Petter Solberg	Subaru Impreza S9 WRC '03	4:38.7	(France) Sébastien Loeb
Leg 2 (6 Sep)	SS16	Helena East 2	20.49 km	(France) Sébastien Loeb	Citroën Xsara WRC	11:23.8	(France) Sébastien Loeb
Leg 2 (6 Sep)	SS17	Helena West 2	12.60 km	(France) Sébastien Loeb	Citroën Xsara WRC	7:10.6	(France) Sébastien Loeb
Leg 2 (6 Sep)	SS18	Helena South 2	17.31 km	(France) Sébastien Loeb	Citroën Xsara WRC	8:46.6	(France) Sébastien Loeb
Leg 2 (6 Sep)	SS19	Perth City Super 3	2.45 km	(Estonia) Markko Märtin	Ford Focus RS WRC '03	1:31.7	(France) Sébastien Loeb
Leg 2 (6 Sep)	SS20	Perth City Super 4	2.45 km	(Estonia) Markko Märtin	Ford Focus RS WRC '03	1:31.8	(France) Sébastien Loeb
Leg 3 (7 Sep)	SS21	Bannister North	24.81 km	(Norway) Petter Solberg	Subaru Impreza S9 WRC '03	13:11.9	(Norway) Petter Solberg
Leg 3 (7 Sep)	SS22	Bannister South	34.16 km	(France) Sébastien Loeb	Citroën Xsara WRC	16:00.1	(France) Sébastien Loeb
Leg 3 (7 Sep)	SS23	Bannister West	24.69 km	(Norway) Petter Solberg	Subaru Impreza S9 WRC '03	12:22.6	(Norway) Petter Solberg
Leg 3 (7 Sep)	SS24	Bannister Central	33.45 km	(United Kingdom) Colin McRae	Citroën Xsara WRC	18:10.0	(Norway) Petter Solberg

==== Championship standings ====
Pos.	Drivers' championships			Co-drivers' championships			Manufacturers' championships		
Pos.	Move	Driver	Points	Move	Co-driver	Points	Move	Manufacturer	Points
1		(United Kingdom) Richard Burns	55		(United Kingdom) Robert Reid	55		(France) Marlboro Peugeot Total	110
2	2	(Norway) Petter Solberg	48	2	(United Kingdom) Phil Mills	48		(France) Citroën Total WRT	110
3	1	(Spain) Carlos Sainz	48	1	(Spain) Marc Martí	48	1	(Japan) 555 Subaru World Rally Team	74
4	1	(France) Sébastien Loeb	45	1	(Monaco) Daniel Elena	45	1	(United Kingdom) Ford Motor Co. Ltd.	61
5	2	(Finland) Marcus Grönholm	38	2	(Finland) Timo Rautiainen	38		(Czech Republic) Škoda Motorsport	20

=== Production World Rally Championship ===
==== Classification ====
Position		No.	Driver	Co-driver	Entrant	Car	Time	Difference	Points
Event	Class	No.	Driver	Co-driver	Entrant	Car	Time	Difference	Points
1	1	55	(United Kingdom) Martin Rowe	(United Kingdom) Trevor Agnew	(United Kingdom) David Sutton Cars Ltd	Subaru Impreza WRX STI N10	3:54:17.1		10
2	2	51	(Malaysia) Karamjit Singh	(Malaysia) Allen Oh	(Malaysia) Petronas EON Racing Team	Proton Pert	3:56:14.1	+1:57.0	8
3	3	60	(United Kingdom) Niall McShea	(United Kingdom) Chris Patterson	(New Zealand) Neil Allport Motorsports	Mitsubishi Lancer Evo VI	3:56:56.1	+2:39.0	6
4	4	65	(Sweden) Stig Blomqvist	(New Zealand) Rob Scott	(United Kingdom) David Sutton Cars Ltd	Subaru Impreza WRX STI N10	4:03:55.5	+9:38.4	5
5	5	52	(Spain) Daniel Solà	(Spain) Álex Romaní	(Italy) Mauro Rally Tuning	Mitsubishi Lancer Evo VII	4:04:37.6	+10:20.5	4
6	6	64	(Sweden) Joakim Roman	(Sweden) Ragnar Spjuth	(Sweden) Milbrooks World Rally Team	Mitsubishi Lancer Evo VI	4:21:59.9	+27:42.8	3
Retired SS14		54	(Japan) Toshihiro Arai	(New Zealand) Tony Sircombe	(Japan) Subaru Production Rally Team	Subaru Impreza WRX STI N10	Mechanical		0
Retired SS11		58	(Argentina) Marcos Ligato	(Argentina) Rubén García	(Italy) Top Run SRL	Mitsubishi Lancer Evo VII	Transmission		0
Retired SS11		59	(Italy) Stefano Marrini	(Italy) Massimo Agostinelli	(Italy) Top Run SRL	Mitsubishi Lancer Evo VI	Excluded		0
Retired SS8		72	(Romania) Constantin Aur	(Romania) Adrian Berghea	(Austria) Stohl Racing	Mitsubishi Lancer Evo VII	Mechanical		0
Retired SS4		53	(Peru) Ramón Ferreyros	(Mexico) Javier Marín	(Italy) Mauro Rally Tuning	Mitsubishi Lancer Evo VI	Mechanical		0

==== Special stages ====
Day	Stage	Stage name	Length	Winner	Car	Time	Class leaders
Leg 1 (4 Sep)	SS1	Perth City Super 1	2.45 km	(Argentina) Marcos Ligato	Mitsubishi Lancer Evo VII	1:39.9	(Argentina) Marcos Ligato
Leg 1 (5 Sep)	SS2	Murray North 1	18.49 km	(Argentina) Marcos Ligato	Mitsubishi Lancer Evo VII	11:25.8	(Argentina) Marcos Ligato
Leg 1 (5 Sep)	SS3	Murray South 1	20.12 km	(Argentina) Marcos Ligato	Mitsubishi Lancer Evo VII	12:57.7	(Argentina) Marcos Ligato
Leg 1 (5 Sep)	SS4	Gobbys	5.20 km	(Argentina) Marcos Ligato	Mitsubishi Lancer Evo VII	2:45.2	(Argentina) Marcos Ligato
Leg 1 (5 Sep)	SS5	Stirling West	15.89 km	(Argentina) Marcos Ligato	Mitsubishi Lancer Evo VII	10:06.0	(Argentina) Marcos Ligato
Leg 1 (5 Sep)	SS6	Stirling Long	34.99 km	(United Kingdom) Martin Rowe	Subaru Impreza WRX STI N10	21:54.6	(Argentina) Marcos Ligato
Leg 1 (5 Sep)	SS7	Turner Hill	7.00 km	(Malaysia) Karamjit Singh	Proton Pert	4:51.7	(Argentina) Marcos Ligato
Leg 1 (5 Sep)	SS8	Murray North 2	18.49 km	(United Kingdom) Niall McShea	Mitsubishi Lancer Evo VI	11:12.7	(United Kingdom) Martin Rowe
Leg 1 (5 Sep)	SS9	Murray South 2	20.12 km	(Japan) Toshihiro Arai	Subaru Impreza WRX STI N10	12:52.0	(United Kingdom) Martin Rowe
Leg 1 (5 Sep)	SS10	Perth City Super 2	2.45 km	(Sweden) Stig Blomqvist	Subaru Impreza WRX STI N10	1:40.7	(United Kingdom) Martin Rowe
Leg 2 (6 Sep)	SS11	Beraking East	8.88 km	(Japan) Toshihiro Arai	Subaru Impreza WRX STI N10	5:40.1	(United Kingdom) Martin Rowe
Leg 2 (6 Sep)	SS12	Helena East 1	20.49 km	(United Kingdom) Martin Rowe	Subaru Impreza WRX STI N10	12:43.4	(United Kingdom) Martin Rowe
Leg 2 (6 Sep)	SS13	Helena West 1	12.60 km	(Japan) Toshihiro Arai	Subaru Impreza WRX STI N10	8:00.5	(United Kingdom) Martin Rowe
Leg 2 (6 Sep)	SS14	Helena South 1	17.31 km	(United Kingdom) Martin Rowe	Subaru Impreza WRX STI N10	9:52.6	(United Kingdom) Martin Rowe
Leg 2 (6 Sep)	SS15	Beraking West	9.42 km	(Spain) Daniel Solà	Mitsubishi Lancer Evo VII	5:05.1	(United Kingdom) Martin Rowe
Leg 2 (6 Sep)	SS16	Helena East 2	20.49 km	(Spain) Daniel Solà	Mitsubishi Lancer Evo VII	12:30.9	(United Kingdom) Martin Rowe
Leg 2 (6 Sep)	SS17	Helena West 2	12.60 km	(Spain) Daniel Solà	Mitsubishi Lancer Evo VII	7:53.2	(United Kingdom) Martin Rowe
Leg 2 (6 Sep)	SS18	Helena South 2	17.31 km	(Spain) Daniel Solà	Mitsubishi Lancer Evo VII	9:40.5	(United Kingdom) Martin Rowe
Leg 2 (6 Sep)	SS19	Perth City Super 3	2.45 km	(Sweden) Stig Blomqvist	Subaru Impreza WRX STI N10	1:39.1	(United Kingdom) Martin Rowe
Leg 2 (6 Sep)	SS20	Perth City Super 4	2.45 km	(Sweden) Stig Blomqvist	Subaru Impreza WRX STI N10	1:38.7	(United Kingdom) Martin Rowe
Leg 3 (7 Sep)	SS21	Bannister North	24.81 km	(United Kingdom) Martin Rowe	Subaru Impreza WRX STI N10	14:36.6	(United Kingdom) Martin Rowe
Leg 3 (7 Sep)	SS22	Bannister South	34.16 km	(United Kingdom) Martin Rowe	Subaru Impreza WRX STI N10	17:36.1	(United Kingdom) Martin Rowe
Leg 3 (7 Sep)	SS23	Bannister West	24.69 km	(United Kingdom) Niall McShea	Mitsubishi Lancer Evo VI	13:48.8	(United Kingdom) Martin Rowe
Leg 3 (7 Sep)	SS24	Bannister Central	33.45 km	(United Kingdom) Niall McShea	Mitsubishi Lancer Evo VI	20:07.5	(United Kingdom) Martin Rowe

==== Championship standings ====
Pos.	Drivers' championships		
Pos.	Move	Driver	Points
1	1	(United Kingdom) Martin Rowe	37
2	1	(Japan) Toshihiro Arai	30
3		(Malaysia) Karamjit Singh	30
4		(Sweden) Stig Blomqvist	26
5		(Spain) Daniel Solà	22
