= 2002 Rally New Zealand =

12th round of the 2002 World Rally Championship

2002 Rally New Zealand 33rd Propecia Rally New Zealand
Round 12 of the 2002 World Rally Championship season
← Previous event	Next event →
- Host country: New Zealand
- Rally base: Auckland
- Dates run: October 4, 2002 – October 6, 2002
- Stages: 26 (411.40 km; 255.63 miles)
- Stage surface: Gravel
- Overall distance: 1,793.23 km (1,114.26 miles)

Statistics
- Crews: 81 at start, 42 at finish

Overall results
- Overall winner: (Finland) Marcus Grönholm (Finland) Timo Rautiainen (France) Peugeot Total; Peugeot 206 WRC

The 2002 Rally New Zealand (formally the 33rd Propecia Rally New Zealand) was the twelfth round of the 2002 World Rally Championship. The race, held from 4 to 6 October 2002, was won by Peugeot's Marcus Grönholm, his 11th win in the World Rally Championship.

== Background ==
=== Entry list ===
No.	Driver	Co-Driver	Entrant	Car	Tyre
World Rally Championship manufacturer entries
1	(United Kingdom) Richard Burns	(United Kingdom) Robert Reid	(France) Peugeot Total	Peugeot 206 WRC	MI
2	(Finland) Marcus Grönholm	(Finland) Timo Rautiainen	(France) Peugeot Total	Peugeot 206 WRC	MI
3	(Finland) Harri Rovanperä	(Finland) Voitto Silander	(France) Peugeot Total	Peugeot 206 WRC	MI
4	(Spain) Carlos Sainz	(Spain) Luis Moya	(United Kingdom) Ford Motor Co. Ltd.	Ford Focus RS WRC '02	P
5	(United Kingdom) Colin McRae	(United Kingdom) Nicky Grist	(United Kingdom) Ford Motor Co. Ltd.	Ford Focus RS WRC '02	P
6	(Estonia) Markko Märtin	(United Kingdom) Michael Park	(United Kingdom) Ford Motor Co. Ltd.	Ford Focus RS WRC '02	P
7	(France) François Delecour	(France) Daniel Grataloup	(Japan) Marlboro Mitsubishi Ralliart	Mitsubishi Lancer WRC2	MI
9	(Finland) Jani Paasonen	(Finland) Arto Kapanen	(Japan) Marlboro Mitsubishi Ralliart	Mitsubishi Lancer WRC2	MI
10	(Finland) Tommi Mäkinen	(Finland) Kaj Lindström	(Japan) 555 Subaru World Rally Team	Subaru Impreza S7 WRC '01	P
11	(Norway) Petter Solberg	(United Kingdom) Phil Mills	(Japan) 555 Subaru World Rally Team	Subaru Impreza S8 WRC '02	P
14	(Sweden) Kenneth Eriksson	(Sweden) Tina Thörner	(Czech Republic) Škoda Motorsport	Škoda Octavia WRC Evo3	MI
15	(Finland) Toni Gardemeister	(Finland) Paavo Lukander	(Czech Republic) Škoda Motorsport	Škoda Octavia WRC Evo3	MI
17	(Germany) Armin Schwarz	(Germany) Manfred Hiemer	(South Korea) Hyundai Castrol World Rally Team	Hyundai Accent WRC3	MI
18	(Belgium) Freddy Loix	(Belgium) Sven Smeets	(South Korea) Hyundai Castrol World Rally Team	Hyundai Accent WRC3	MI
19	(Finland) Juha Kankkunen	(Finland) Juha Repo	(South Korea) Hyundai Castrol World Rally Team	Hyundai Accent WRC3	MI
World Rally Championship entries
23	(France) Gilles Panizzi	(France) Hervé Panizzi	(France) Peugeot Total	Peugeot 206 WRC	MI
32	(Poland) Tomasz Kuchar	(Poland) Maciej Szczepaniak	(Poland) Tomasz Kuchar	Toyota Corolla WRC	MI
105	(New Zealand) Bruce Herbert	(New Zealand) Robert Ryan	(New Zealand) Rose City Cars	Subaru Impreza STI N8	—N/a
107	(New Zealand) Geoff Argyle	(New Zealand) Steve Smith	(New Zealand) Racetech Seats	Mitsubishi Lancer Evo 6.5	—N/a
108	(New Zealand) Todd Bawden	(New Zealand) Damon McLachlan	Ralliart New Zealand	Mitsubishi Lancer Evo VI	—N/a
109	(New Zealand) Richard Mason	(New Zealand) Hamish Fenemor	(New Zealand) Racetech Seats	Mitsubishi Lancer Evo V	—N/a
113	(New Zealand) Andrew Hawkeswood	(New Zealand) Samantha Haldane	(New Zealand) Dayton Automotive	Subaru Impreza WRX STI	—N/a
119	(New Zealand) Glenn Smith	(New Zealand) Colin Smith	(New Zealand) Glenn Smith	Mitsubishi Lancer Evo VI	—N/a
120	(New Zealand) Lewis Scott	(New Zealand) Jane Black	(New Zealand) Scott Rallying	Mitsubishi Lancer Evo V	—N/a
121	(New Zealand) Austen Jones	(New Zealand) Bede O'Connor	(New Zealand) Austen Jones	Subaru Impreza WRX	—N/a
123	(New Zealand) Clinton Anderson	(New Zealand) Kelvin McCaughey	(New Zealand) Racetech Seats	Mitsubishi Lancer Evo VI	—N/a
124	(New Zealand) Wayne Parker	(New Zealand) Brendan McKay	(New Zealand) Palmerston North Rallysport Club	Mitsubishi Lancer Evo V	—N/a
125	(United Kingdom) Natalie Barratt	(United Kingdom) Roger Freeman	(United Kingdom) Natalie Barratt Rallysport	Hyundai Accent WRC	—N/a
126	(New Zealand) Mike Turfus	(New Zealand) Fleur Pedersen	(New Zealand) Silverstone Rally Tyre Team	Mitsubishi Lancer Evo VI	—N/a
128	(Australia) Brett Middleton	(Australia) Andrew Benefield	(Australia) Middleton Rally Team	Subaru Impreza WRX STI	—N/a
129	(New Zealand) David Ayling	(New Zealand) Grant Kenny	(New Zealand) ART Racing	Subaru Impreza WRX STI	—N/a
133	(New Zealand) Kerry Evans	(New Zealand) Rocky Hudson	(New Zealand) KEA Trailers	Subaru Impreza	—N/a
135	(New Zealand) Kingsley Jones	(New Zealand) Len Fisher	(New Zealand) Kingsley Jones	Mitsubishi Lancer Evo III	—N/a
137	(New Zealand) Rex Vizible	(New Zealand) Dave Robb	(New Zealand) Vizible Racing	Subaru Impreza WRX STI	—N/a
138	(New Zealand) Emma Gilmour	(New Zealand) Toni Feaver	(New Zealand) Emma Gilmour	Mitsubishi Lancer Evo III	—N/a
140	(New Zealand) Malcolm Stewart	(New Zealand) Mike Fletcher	(New Zealand) Malcolm Stewart	Mitsubishi Lancer Evo 6.5	—N/a
143	(United Kingdom) Bruce Warburton	(New Zealand) Colin Davies	(United Kingdom) Provision	Subaru Impreza WRX	—N/a
144	(Japan) Takemi Matsuno	(Japan) Shunichi Washio	(Japan) Team Fa Coat	Subaru Impreza 555	—N/a
147	(New Zealand) David Langford-Smith	(New Zealand) Stuart Roberts	(New Zealand) Prolinks Inc. Ltd.	Subaru Impreza WRX STI	—N/a
PWRC entries
52	(Argentina) Marcos Ligato	(Argentina) Rubén García	(Italy) Top Run SRL	Mitsubishi Lancer Evo VII	—N/a
53	(Italy) Alessandro Fiorio	(Italy) Enrico Cantoni	(Italy) Ralliart Italia	Mitsubishi Lancer Evo VII	—N/a
54	(Peru) Ramón Ferreyros	(Argentina) Jorge Del Buono	(Italy) Mauro Rally Tuning	Mitsubishi Lancer Evo VII	—N/a
57	(Japan) Toshihiro Arai	(New Zealand) Tony Sircombe	(Japan) Spike Subaru Team	Subaru Impreza WRX	—N/a
58	(Italy) Luca Baldini	(Italy) Marco Muzzarelli	(Italy) Top Run SRL	Mitsubishi Lancer Evo VI	—N/a
65	(Austria) Beppo Harrach	(Austria) Peter Müller	(Austria) Stohl Racing	Mitsubishi Lancer Evo VI	—N/a
66	(Bulgaria) Dimitar Iliev	(Bulgaria) Petar Sivov	(Italy) Mauro Rally Tuning	Mitsubishi Lancer Evo VI	—N/a
69	(Norway) Bernt Kollevold	(Norway) Ola Fløene	(Norway) Kollevold Rally Team	Mitsubishi Lancer Evo VII	—N/a
70	(Italy) Giovanni Manfrinato	(Italy) Claudio Condotta	(Italy) Top Run SRL	Mitsubishi Lancer Evo VI	—N/a
71	(Italy) Stefano Marrini	(Italy) Tiziana Sandroni	(Italy) Top Run SRL	Mitsubishi Lancer Evo VII	—N/a
73	(United Kingdom) Martin Rowe	(United Kingdom) Chris Wood	(United Kingdom) David Sutton Cars Ltd	Mitsubishi Lancer Evo VII	—N/a
74	(Malaysia) Karamjit Singh	(Malaysia) Allen Oh	(Malaysia) Petronas EON Racing Team	Proton Pert	—N/a
75	(Finland) Kristian Sohlberg	(Finland) Jakke Honkanen	Mitsubishi Ralliart Finland	Mitsubishi Lancer Evo VII	MI
77	(Italy) Alfredo De Dominicis	(Italy) Rudy Pollet	Ralliart Italy	Mitsubishi Lancer Evo VII	—N/a

=== Itinerary ===
All dates and times are NZST (UTC+12) from 4 to 5 October 2002 and NZDT (UTC+13) on 6 October 2002.

Date	Time	No.	Stage name	Distance
Leg 1 — 117.08 km
4 October	08:58	SS1	Te Akau North	32.37 km
4 October	11:06	SS2	Maungatawhiri	6.52 km
4 October	11:29	SS3	Te Papatapu 1	16.62 km
4 October	12:02	SS4	Whaanga Coast	29.60 km
4 October	13:53	SS5	Te Hutewai	11.15 km
4 October	14:21	SS6	Te Papatapu 2	16.62 km
4 October	19:00	SS7	Manukau Super 1	2.10 km
4 October	19:30	SS8	Manukau Super 2	2.10 km
Leg 2 — 204.13 km
5 October	09:13	SS9	Mititai Finish	20.15 km
5 October	09:51	SS10	Tokatoka 1	10.15 km
5 October	11:01	SS11	Parahi — Ararua	59.00 km
5 October	14:13	SS12	Batley	17.46 km
5 October	14:41	SS13	Waipu Gorge	11.24 km
5 October	14:59	SS14	Brooks	16.03 km
5 October	15:27	SS15	Paparoa Station	11.64 km
5 October	17:17	SS16	Cassidy	21.64 km
5 October	18:00	SS17	Mititai	26.67 km
5 October	18:43	SS18	Tokatoka 2	10.15 km
Leg 3 — 90.19 km
6 October	08:08	SS19	Otorohea Trig	4.62 km
6 October	08:31	SS20	Te Akau South	32.43 km
6 October	10:49	SS21	Ridge 1	8.53 km
6 October	11:05	SS22	Campbell 1	7.44 km
6 October	11:23	SS23	Ridge 2	8.53 km
6 October	11:39	SS24	Campbell 2	7.44 km
6 October	12:22	SS25	Fyfe 1	10.60 km
6 October	12:52	SS26	Fyfe 2	10.60 km

== Results ==
=== Overall ===
Pos.	No.	Driver	Co-driver	Team	Car	Time	Difference	Points
1	2	(Finland) Marcus Grönholm	(Finland) Timo Rautiainen	(France) Peugeot Total	Peugeot 206 WRC	3:58:45.4		10
2	3	(Finland) Harri Rovanperä	(Finland) Voitto Silander	(France) Peugeot Total	Peugeot 206 WRC	4:02:33.0	+3:47.6	6
3	10	(Finland) Tommi Mäkinen	(Finland) Kaj Lindström	(Japan) 555 Subaru World Rally Team	Subaru Impreza S7 WRC '01	4:03:11.7	+4:26.3	4
4	4	(Spain) Carlos Sainz	(Spain) Luis Moya	(United Kingdom) Ford Motor Co. Ltd.	Ford Focus RS WRC '02	4:04:34.3	+5:48.9	3
5	19	(Finland) Juha Kankkunen	(Finland) Juha Repo	(South Korea) Hyundai Castrol World Rally Team	Hyundai Accent WRC3	4:05:55.6	+7:10.2	2
6	18	(Belgium) Freddy Loix	(Belgium) Sven Smeets	(South Korea) Hyundai Castrol World Rally Team	Hyundai Accent WRC3	4:06:37.9	+7:52.5	1

=== World Rally Cars ===
==== Classification ====
Position		No.	Driver	Co-driver	Entrant	Car	Time	Difference	Points
Event	Class	No.	Driver	Co-driver	Entrant	Car	Time	Difference	Points
1	1	2	(Finland) Marcus Grönholm	(Finland) Timo Rautiainen	(France) Peugeot Total	Peugeot 206 WRC	3:58:45.4		10
2	2	3	(Finland) Harri Rovanperä	(Finland) Voitto Silander	(France) Peugeot Total	Peugeot 206 WRC	4:02:33.0	+3:47.6	6
3	3	10	(Finland) Tommi Mäkinen	(Finland) Kaj Lindström	(Japan) 555 Subaru World Rally Team	Subaru Impreza S7 WRC '01	4:03:11.7	+4:26.3	4
4	4	4	(Spain) Carlos Sainz	(Spain) Luis Moya	(United Kingdom) Ford Motor Co. Ltd.	Ford Focus RS WRC '02	4:04:34.3	+5:48.9	3
5	5	19	(Finland) Juha Kankkunen	(Finland) Juha Repo	(South Korea) Hyundai Castrol World Rally Team	Hyundai Accent WRC3	4:05:55.6	+7:10.2	2
6	6	18	(Belgium) Freddy Loix	(Belgium) Sven Smeets	(South Korea) Hyundai Castrol World Rally Team	Hyundai Accent WRC3	4:06:37.9	+7:52.5	1
8	7	15	(Finland) Toni Gardemeister	(Finland) Paavo Lukander	(Czech Republic) Škoda Motorsport	Škoda Octavia WRC Evo3	4:07:41.5	+8:56.1	0
9	8	7	(France) François Delecour	(France) Daniel Grataloup	(Japan) Marlboro Mitsubishi Ralliart	Mitsubishi Lancer WRC2	4:09:29.0	+10:43.6	0
10	9	17	(Germany) Armin Schwarz	(Germany) Manfred Hiemer	(South Korea) Hyundai Castrol World Rally Team	Hyundai Accent WRC3	4:10:20.2	+11:34.8	0
Retired SS25		11	(Norway) Petter Solberg	(United Kingdom) Phil Mills	(Japan) 555 Subaru World Rally Team	Subaru Impreza S8 WRC '02	Engine		0
Retired SS15		1	(United Kingdom) Richard Burns	(United Kingdom) Robert Reid	(France) Peugeot Total	Peugeot 206 WRC	Accident		0
Retired SS14		6	(Estonia) Markko Märtin	(United Kingdom) Michael Park	(United Kingdom) Ford Motor Co. Ltd.	Ford Focus RS WRC '02	Accident		0
Retired SS11		9	(Finland) Jani Paasonen	(Finland) Arto Kapanen	(Japan) Marlboro Mitsubishi Ralliart	Mitsubishi Lancer WRC2	Accident		0
Retired SS4		5	(United Kingdom) Colin McRae	(United Kingdom) Nicky Grist	(United Kingdom) Ford Motor Co. Ltd.	Ford Focus RS WRC '02	Accident		0
Retired SS2		14	(Sweden) Kenneth Eriksson	(Sweden) Tina Thörner	(Czech Republic) Škoda Motorsport	Škoda Octavia WRC Evo3	Accident		0

==== Special stages ====
Day	Stage	Stage name	Length	Winner	Car	Time	Class leaders
Leg 1 (4 Oct)	SS1	Te Akau North	32.37 km	(United Kingdom) Richard Burns	Peugeot 206 WRC	17:50.4	(United Kingdom) Richard Burns
Leg 1 (4 Oct)	SS2	Maungatawhiri	6.52 km	(United Kingdom) Richard Burns (Finland) Harri Rovanperä	Peugeot 206 WRC; Peugeot 206 WRC	3:41.3	(United Kingdom) Richard Burns
Leg 1 (4 Oct)	SS3	Te Papatapu 1	16.62 km	(United Kingdom) Richard Burns	Peugeot 206 WRC	11:05.2	(United Kingdom) Richard Burns
Leg 1 (4 Oct)	SS4	Whaanga Coast	29.60 km	(United Kingdom) Richard Burns	Peugeot 206 WRC	21:27.0	(United Kingdom) Richard Burns
Leg 1 (4 Oct)	SS5	Te Hutewai	11.15 km	(Finland) Jani Paasonen	Mitsubishi Lancer WRC2	7:59.8	(United Kingdom) Richard Burns
Leg 1 (4 Oct)	SS6	Te Papatapu 2	16.62 km	(Finland) Marcus Grönholm	Peugeot 206 WRC	10:37.7	(United Kingdom) Richard Burns
Leg 1 (4 Oct)	SS7	Manukau Super 1	2.10 km	(Norway) Petter Solberg	Subaru Impreza S8 WRC '02	1:21.3	(United Kingdom) Richard Burns
Leg 1 (4 Oct)	SS8	Manukau Super 2	2.10 km	(Norway) Petter Solberg	Subaru Impreza S8 WRC '02	1:20.8	(United Kingdom) Richard Burns
Leg 2 (5 Oct)	SS9	Mititai Finish	20.15 km	(United Kingdom) Richard Burns	Peugeot 206 WRC	10:05.2	(United Kingdom) Richard Burns
Leg 2 (5 Oct)	SS10	Tokatoka 1	10.15 km	(Finland) Marcus Grönholm	Peugeot 206 WRC	5:09.9	(United Kingdom) Richard Burns
Leg 2 (5 Oct)	SS11	Parahi — Ararua	59.00 km	(United Kingdom) Richard Burns	Peugeot 206 WRC	33:37.7	(United Kingdom) Richard Burns
Leg 2 (5 Oct)	SS12	Batley	17.46 km	(Finland) Marcus Grönholm	Peugeot 206 WRC	9:36.4	(United Kingdom) Richard Burns
Leg 2 (5 Oct)	SS13	Waipu Gorge	11.24 km	(United Kingdom) Richard Burns	Peugeot 206 WRC	6:25.5	(United Kingdom) Richard Burns
Leg 2 (5 Oct)	SS14	Brooks	16.03 km	(United Kingdom) Richard Burns	Peugeot 206 WRC	9:37.1	(United Kingdom) Richard Burns
Leg 2 (5 Oct)	SS15	Paparoa Station	11.64 km	(Finland) Marcus Grönholm	Peugeot 206 WRC	6:11.9	(Finland) Marcus Grönholm
Leg 2 (5 Oct)	SS16	Cassidy	21.64 km	(Finland) Marcus Grönholm	Peugeot 206 WRC	12:16.0	(Finland) Marcus Grönholm
Leg 2 (5 Oct)	SS17	Mititai	26.67 km	(Finland) Marcus Grönholm	Peugeot 206 WRC	13:32.8	(Finland) Marcus Grönholm
Leg 2 (5 Oct)	SS18	Tokatoka 2	10.15 km	(Finland) Marcus Grönholm	Peugeot 206 WRC	5:18.4	(Finland) Marcus Grönholm
Leg 3 (6 Oct)	SS19	Otorohea Trig	4.62 km	(Finland) Marcus Grönholm	Peugeot 206 WRC	3:05.6	(Finland) Marcus Grönholm
Leg 3 (6 Oct)	SS20	Te Akau South	32.43 km	(Finland) Marcus Grönholm	Peugeot 206 WRC	18:43.3	(Finland) Marcus Grönholm
Leg 3 (6 Oct)	SS21	Ridge 1	8.53 km	(Finland) Marcus Grönholm	Peugeot 206 WRC	4:45.8	(Finland) Marcus Grönholm
Leg 3 (6 Oct)	SS22	Campbell 1	7.44 km	(Finland) Marcus Grönholm	Peugeot 206 WRC	3:55.8	(Finland) Marcus Grönholm
Leg 3 (6 Oct)	SS23	Ridge 2	8.53 km	(Finland) Marcus Grönholm	Peugeot 206 WRC	4:43.4	(Finland) Marcus Grönholm
Leg 3 (6 Oct)	SS24	Campbell 2	7.44 km	(Finland) Marcus Grönholm	Peugeot 206 WRC	3:52.9	(Finland) Marcus Grönholm
Leg 3 (6 Oct)	SS25	Fyfe 1	10.60 km	(Finland) Marcus Grönholm	Peugeot 206 WRC	5:47.4	(Finland) Marcus Grönholm
Leg 3 (6 Oct)	SS26	Fyfe 2	10.60 km	(Finland) Marcus Grönholm	Peugeot 206 WRC	5:40.1	(Finland) Marcus Grönholm

==== Championship standings ====
- **Bold text** indicates 2002 World Champions.

Pos.	Drivers' championships			Co-drivers' championships			Manufacturers' championships		
Pos.	Move	Driver	Points	Move	Co-driver	Points	Move	Manufacturer	Points
1		(Finland) **Marcus Grönholm**	67		(Finland) **Timo Rautiainen**	67		(France) **Peugeot Total**	147
2		(United Kingdom) Richard Burns	34		(United Kingdom) Robert Reid	34		(United Kingdom) Ford Motor Co. Ltd.	89
3		(United Kingdom) Colin McRae	33		(United Kingdom) Nicky Grist	33		(Japan) 555 Subaru World Rally Team	50
4		(France) Gilles Panizzi	31		(France) Hervé Panizzi	31		(Japan) Marlboro Mitsubishi Ralliart	9
5		(Spain) Carlos Sainz	29		(Spain) Luis Moya	29	1	(South Korea) Hyundai Castrol World Rally Team	9

=== Production World Rally Championship ===
==== Classification ====
Position		No.	Driver	Co-driver	Entrant	Car	Time	Difference	Points
Event	Class	No.	Driver	Co-driver	Entrant	Car	Time	Difference	Points
14	1	75	(Finland) Kristian Sohlberg	(Finland) Jakke Honkanen	Mitsubishi Ralliart Finland	Mitsubishi Lancer Evo VII	4:18:20.5		10
15	2	73	(United Kingdom) Martin Rowe	(United Kingdom) Chris Wood	(United Kingdom) David Sutton Cars Ltd	Mitsubishi Lancer Evo VII	4:18:38.8	+18.3	6
18	3	70	(Italy) Giovanni Manfrinato	(Italy) Claudio Condotta	(Italy) Top Run SRL	Mitsubishi Lancer Evo VI	4:21:17.7	+2:57.2	4
20	4	53	(Italy) Alessandro Fiorio	(Italy) Enrico Cantoni	(Italy) Ralliart Italia	Mitsubishi Lancer Evo VII	4:21:36.2	+3:15.7	3
23	5	52	(Argentina) Marcos Ligato	(Argentina) Rubén García	(Italy) Top Run SRL	Mitsubishi Lancer Evo VII	4:22:38.4	+4:17.9	2
38	6	69	(Norway) Bernt Kollevold	(Norway) Ola Fløene	(Norway) Kollevold Rally Team	Mitsubishi Lancer Evo VII	4:52:08.3	+33:47.8	1
Retired SS24		58	(Italy) Luca Baldini	(Italy) Marco Muzzarelli	(Italy) Top Run SRL	Mitsubishi Lancer Evo VI	Engine		0
Retired SS14		66	(Bulgaria) Dimitar Iliev	(Bulgaria) Petar Sivov	(Italy) Mauro Rally Tuning	Mitsubishi Lancer Evo VI	Accident		0
Retired SS11		54	(Peru) Ramón Ferreyros	(Argentina) Jorge Del Buono	(Italy) Mauro Rally Tuning	Mitsubishi Lancer Evo VII	Engine		0
Retired SS11		71	(Italy) Stefano Marrini	(Italy) Tiziana Sandroni	(Italy) Top Run SRL	Mitsubishi Lancer Evo VII	Accident		0
Retired SS4		65	(Austria) Beppo Harrach	(Austria) Peter Müller	(Austria) Stohl Racing	Mitsubishi Lancer Evo VI	Accident		0
Retired SS4		77	(Italy) Alfredo De Dominicis	(Italy) Rudy Pollet	Ralliart Italy	Mitsubishi Lancer Evo VII	Accident		0
Retired SS3		57	(Japan) Toshihiro Arai	(New Zealand) Tony Sircombe	(Japan) Spike Subaru Team	Subaru Impreza WRX	Accident		0
Retired SS3		74	(Malaysia) Karamjit Singh	(Malaysia) Allen Oh	(Malaysia) Petronas EON Racing Team	Proton Pert	Accident		0

==== Special stages ====
Day	Stage	Stage name	Length	Winner	Car	Time	Class leaders
Leg 1 (4 Oct)	SS1	Te Akau North	32.37 km	(Argentina) Marcos Ligato	Mitsubishi Lancer Evo VII	18:53.2	(Argentina) Marcos Ligato
Leg 1 (4 Oct)	SS2	Maungatawhiri	6.52 km	(Japan) Toshihiro Arai	Subaru Impreza WRX	3:51.9	(Argentina) Marcos Ligato
Leg 1 (4 Oct)	SS3	Te Papatapu 1	16.62 km	(Finland) Kristian Sohlberg	Mitsubishi Lancer Evo VII	11:36.0	(Argentina) Marcos Ligato
Leg 1 (4 Oct)	SS4	Whaanga Coast	29.60 km	(Italy) Giovanni Manfrinato	Mitsubishi Lancer Evo VI	22:21.2	(Italy) Giovanni Manfrinato
Leg 1 (4 Oct)	SS5	Te Hutewai	11.15 km	(Italy) Giovanni Manfrinato (Finland) Kristian Sohlberg	Mitsubishi Lancer Evo VI; Mitsubishi Lancer Evo VII	8:20.2	(Italy) Giovanni Manfrinato
Leg 1 (4 Oct)	SS6	Te Papatapu 2	16.62 km	(Finland) Kristian Sohlberg	Mitsubishi Lancer Evo VII	11:17.6	(Finland) Kristian Sohlberg
Leg 1 (4 Oct)	SS7	Manukau Super 1	2.10 km	(Argentina) Marcos Ligato	Mitsubishi Lancer Evo VII	1:28.7	(Finland) Kristian Sohlberg
Leg 1 (4 Oct)	SS8	Manukau Super 2	2.10 km	(Finland) Kristian Sohlberg	Mitsubishi Lancer Evo VII	1:27.2	(Finland) Kristian Sohlberg
Leg 2 (5 Oct)	SS9	Mititai Finish	20.15 km	(Argentina) Marcos Ligato	Mitsubishi Lancer Evo VII	11:03.2	(Finland) Kristian Sohlberg
Leg 2 (5 Oct)	SS10	Tokatoka 1	10.15 km	(Argentina) Marcos Ligato	Mitsubishi Lancer Evo VII	5:38.9	(Finland) Kristian Sohlberg
Leg 2 (5 Oct)	SS11	Parahi — Ararua	59.00 km	(Argentina) Marcos Ligato	Mitsubishi Lancer Evo VII	36:16.1	(Finland) Kristian Sohlberg
Leg 2 (5 Oct)	SS12	Batley	17.46 km	(Argentina) Marcos Ligato	Mitsubishi Lancer Evo VII	10:27.5	(Finland) Kristian Sohlberg
Leg 2 (5 Oct)	SS13	Waipu Gorge	11.24 km	(Argentina) Marcos Ligato	Mitsubishi Lancer Evo VII	6:58.6	(Finland) Kristian Sohlberg
Leg 2 (5 Oct)	SS14	Brooks	16.03 km	(Argentina) Marcos Ligato	Mitsubishi Lancer Evo VII	10:26.0	(Finland) Kristian Sohlberg
Leg 2 (5 Oct)	SS15	Paparoa Station	11.64 km	(Finland) Kristian Sohlberg	Mitsubishi Lancer Evo VII	6:44.7	(Finland) Kristian Sohlberg
Leg 2 (5 Oct)	SS16	Cassidy	21.64 km	(United Kingdom) Martin Rowe	Mitsubishi Lancer Evo VII	13:26.8	(Finland) Kristian Sohlberg
Leg 2 (5 Oct)	SS17	Mititai	26.67 km	(Finland) Kristian Sohlberg	Mitsubishi Lancer Evo VII	14:56.7	(Finland) Kristian Sohlberg
Leg 2 (5 Oct)	SS18	Tokatoka 2	10.15 km	(Finland) Kristian Sohlberg	Mitsubishi Lancer Evo VII	5:53.7	(Finland) Kristian Sohlberg
Leg 3 (6 Oct)	SS19	Otorohea Trig	4.62 km	(Argentina) Marcos Ligato	Mitsubishi Lancer Evo VII	3:18.4	(Finland) Kristian Sohlberg
Leg 3 (6 Oct)	SS20	Te Akau South	32.43 km	(Argentina) Marcos Ligato	Mitsubishi Lancer Evo VII	20:07.0	(Finland) Kristian Sohlberg
Leg 3 (6 Oct)	SS21	Ridge 1	8.53 km	(Argentina) Marcos Ligato	Mitsubishi Lancer Evo VII	5:07.7	(Finland) Kristian Sohlberg
Leg 3 (6 Oct)	SS22	Campbell 1	7.44 km	(United Kingdom) Martin Rowe	Mitsubishi Lancer Evo VII	4:14.0	(Finland) Kristian Sohlberg
Leg 3 (6 Oct)	SS23	Ridge 2	8.53 km	(United Kingdom) Martin Rowe	Mitsubishi Lancer Evo VII	5:06.3	(Finland) Kristian Sohlberg
Leg 3 (6 Oct)	SS24	Campbell 2	7.44 km	(United Kingdom) Martin Rowe	Mitsubishi Lancer Evo VII	4:10.1	(Finland) Kristian Sohlberg
Leg 3 (6 Oct)	SS25	Fyfe 1	10.60 km	(Argentina) Marcos Ligato (Finland) Kristian Sohlberg	Mitsubishi Lancer Evo VII; Mitsubishi Lancer Evo VII	6:11.7	(Finland) Kristian Sohlberg
Leg 3 (6 Oct)	SS26	Fyfe 2	10.60 km	(Italy) Alessandro Fiorio	Mitsubishi Lancer Evo VII	6:03.2	(Finland) Kristian Sohlberg

==== Championship standings ====
Pos.	Drivers' championships		
Pos.	Move	Driver	Points
1		(Malaysia) Karamjit Singh	28
2	1	(Finland) Kristian Sohlberg	26
3	1	(Peru) Ramón Ferreyros	20
4		(Italy) Alessandro Fiorio	16
5		(Japan) Toshihiro Arai	12
