= Martin Rowe =

British rally driver (born 1971)

Personal information
- Nationality: (United Kingdom) British (Isle of Man) Manx
- Born: June 24, 1971 (age 55); Onchan, Isle of Man

World Rally Championship record
- Years active: 1994, 1997 - 1999, 2001 – 2003
- Co-driver: (United Kingdom) Chris Wood (United Kingdom) Nicky Beech (United Kingdom) Derek Ringer (United Kingdom) Trevor Agnew
- Teams: Peugeot, Renault, Ford, Subaru
- Rallies: 33
- Championships: 0
- Rally wins: 0
- Podiums: 0
- Stage wins: 0
- Total points: 0
- First rally: 1994 RAC Rally
- Last rally: 2003 Wales Rally GB

Martin Rowe (born 24 June 1971) is a British and Manx rally driver who won the British Rally Championship in 1998, the British Formula Rally Championship in 2001, Production World Rally Championship in 2003 and the Chinese Rally Championship in 2006.

Alongside his title in the British Rally Championship in 1998, Rowe took the Formula Rally Championship in 2001 driving a Ford Puma S1600 after original champion, Justin Dale, his co-driver Andrew Bargery, and winning manufacturer Peugeot were excluded due to a homologation issue in the final round which affected both Proton and Peugeot. With Dale later losing his appeal, Rowe was awarded the drivers title and Chris Wood the co-drivers title.

In 1998 and 2003 Rowe was named as the National Rally Driver of the Year.

== Racing record ==
=== Complete WRC results ===
Year	Entrant	Car	1	2	3	4	5	6	7	8	9	10	11	12	13	14	Pos	Points
1994	Peugeot Sport Great Britain	Peugeot 306 S16	MON	POR	KEN	FRA	GRC	ARG	NZL	FIN	ITA	GBR; 14					NC	0
1997	Renault Dealer Rallying UK	Renault Mégane Maxi	MON	SWE	KEN	POR	ESP	FRA	ARG	GRC	NZL	FIN	INA	ITA	AUS	GBR; Ret	NC	0
1998	Renault Dealer Rallying UK	Renault Mégane Maxi	MON	SWE	KEN	POR	ESP	FRA; 14	ARG	GRC	NZL	FIN	ITA; Ret	AUS	GBR; Ret		NC	0
1999	Renault Elf Dealer Rallying	Renault Mégane Maxi	MON	SWE	KEN	POR; 19	ESP	FRA; Ret	ARG	GRC	NZL	FIN; 19	CHN	ITA| 17	AUS; 10	GBR; 18	NC	0
2001	Martin Rowe	Ford Puma S1600	MON	SWE	POR	ESP	ARG	CYP	GRC	KEN	FIN; Ret	NZL	ITA; 25	FRA	AUS	GBR; Ret	NC	0
2002	Martin Rowe	Ford Puma S1600	MON; Ret			ESP; 30			GRC; 24	KEN		GER; 19	ITA; Ret			GBR; Ret	NC	0
2002	Martin Rowe	Mitsubishi Lancer Evo VII					CYP; Ret	ARG			FIN; Ret			NZL; 15	AUS; 21		NC	0
2002	Martin Rowe	Mitsubishi Lancer Evo VI		SWE; 38													NC	0
2002	David Sutton Cars Ltd	Mitsubishi Lancer Evo VI			FRA; 21												NC	0
2003	David Sutton Cars Ltd	Subaru Impreza STi N8	MON	SWE; 29	TUR	NZL; 18	ARG	GRC									NC	0
2003	David Sutton Cars Ltd	Subaru Impreza STi N10							CYP; 10	GER; 24	FIN	AUS; 15	ITA	FRA; 18	ESP	GBR; Ret	NC	0

=== JWRC results ===
Year	Entrant	Car	1	2	3	4	5	6	Pos	Points
2002	Martin Rowe	Ford Puma S1600	MON; Ret	ESP; 10	GRE; 5	GER; 5	ITA; Ret	GBR; Ret	11th	4

=== PWRC results ===
Year	Entrant	Car	1	2	3	4	5	6	7	8	Pos	Points
2002	Martin Rowe	Mitsubishi Lancer Evo VII			CYP; Ret	ARG	KEN	FIN; Ret	NZL; 2	AUS; 5	6th	13
2002	Martin Rowe	Mitsubishi Lancer Evo VI	SWE; 6								6th	13
2002	David Sutton Cars Ltd	Mitsubishi Lancer Evo VI		FRA; 3							6th	13
2003	David Sutton Cars Ltd	Subaru Impreza STi N8	SWE; 3	NZL; 4	ARG						1st	43
2003	David Sutton Cars Ltd	Subaru Impreza STi N10				CYP; 2	GER; 2	AUS; 1	FRA; 3		1st	43

Awards and achievements
Preceded by Mark Higgins	Autosport; National Rally Driver of the Year; 1998	Succeeded by Tapio Laukkanen
Preceded by Justin Dale	Autosport; National Rally Driver of the Year; 2003	Succeeded by Guy Wilks
