= Tomasz Kuchar =

Polish rally and rallycross driver (born 1976)

Tomasz Józef Kuchar
- Nationality: Polish
- Born: July 16, 1976 (age 49) Wrocław, Poland
- Wins: Rajd Barbórka Warszawska (6 times)

Championship titles
- Polish Rallycross Champion (2016–2019), Polish Rally Champion (multiple categories)

Awards
- Volkswagen Sport Trophy Winner (1999)

Tomasz Józef Kuchar (born 16 July 1976 in Wrocław) is a Polish rally and rallycross driver - Polish Rallycross Champion 2016, 2017, 2018, 2019.

Polish Champion in Rallycross SuperCars 2019, Polish Champion in Rallycross SuperCars 2018, Polish Champion in Rallycross SuperCars 2017, Polish Vice Champion in Rallycross in sponsors' classification 2017, Polish Champion in Rallycross SuperCars 2016, Polish Champion in Rallycross in sponsors' classification 2016, 6-times winner of prestige Rajd Barbórka Warszawska, Polish Rally Champion in HR-P 2011, Polish Rally Champion in Manufactures classification 2010, Vice-Champion of Motointegrator Gravel Cup 2010, Polish Rally Vice-Champion gr N 2009 (best Pole), Polish Rally Champion in Super 2000 2009, Polish Rally Vice-Champion in sponsors' classification 2009 (best Pole), Polish Rally Champion in Manufactures classification 2009, Polish Rally Vice-Champion super 2000 2008, Polish Rally Vice-Champion overall 2007 (best Pole), Polish Rally Vice-Champion gr N 2007 (best Pole), Polish Rally Vice-Champion in sponsors' classification 2007 (best Pole), member of Hyundai Castrol Word Rally Team, Polish Rally Champion in F-2 2000, Polish Rally Champion in F-2 1999, Volkswagen Sport Trophy Winner 1999, Polish Rally Champion in N3 1998, Polish Rally Vice-Champion in F-2 1998, Polish Rally Vice-Champion N3 1997, Polish Rally Vice-Champion F-2 1997

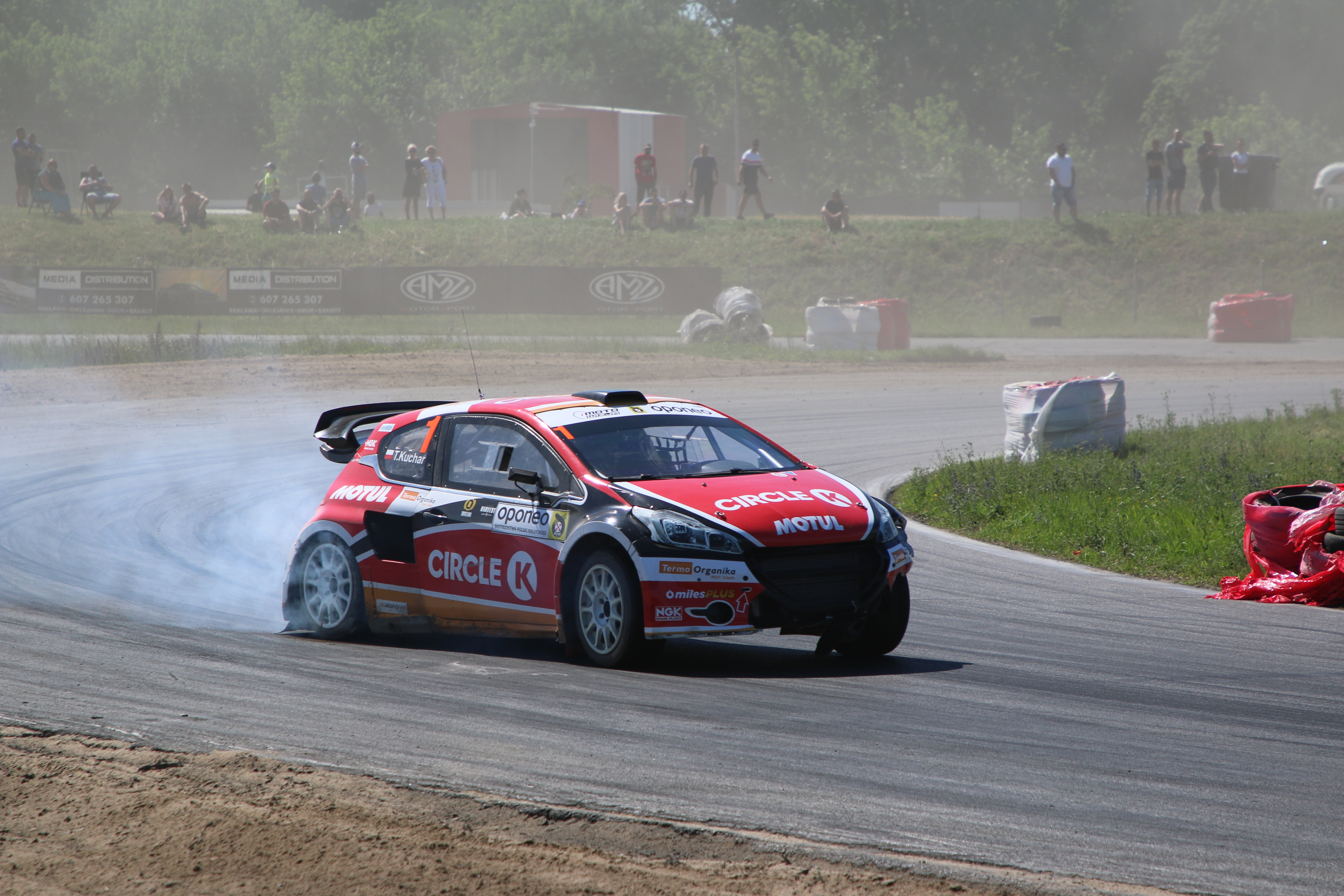
Tomasz Kuchar, rally and rallycross driver

== See also ==
- Markko Märtin
- Michael Park
- Janusz Kulig
