= Sven Smeets =

Belgian rally co-driver and engineer (born 1972)

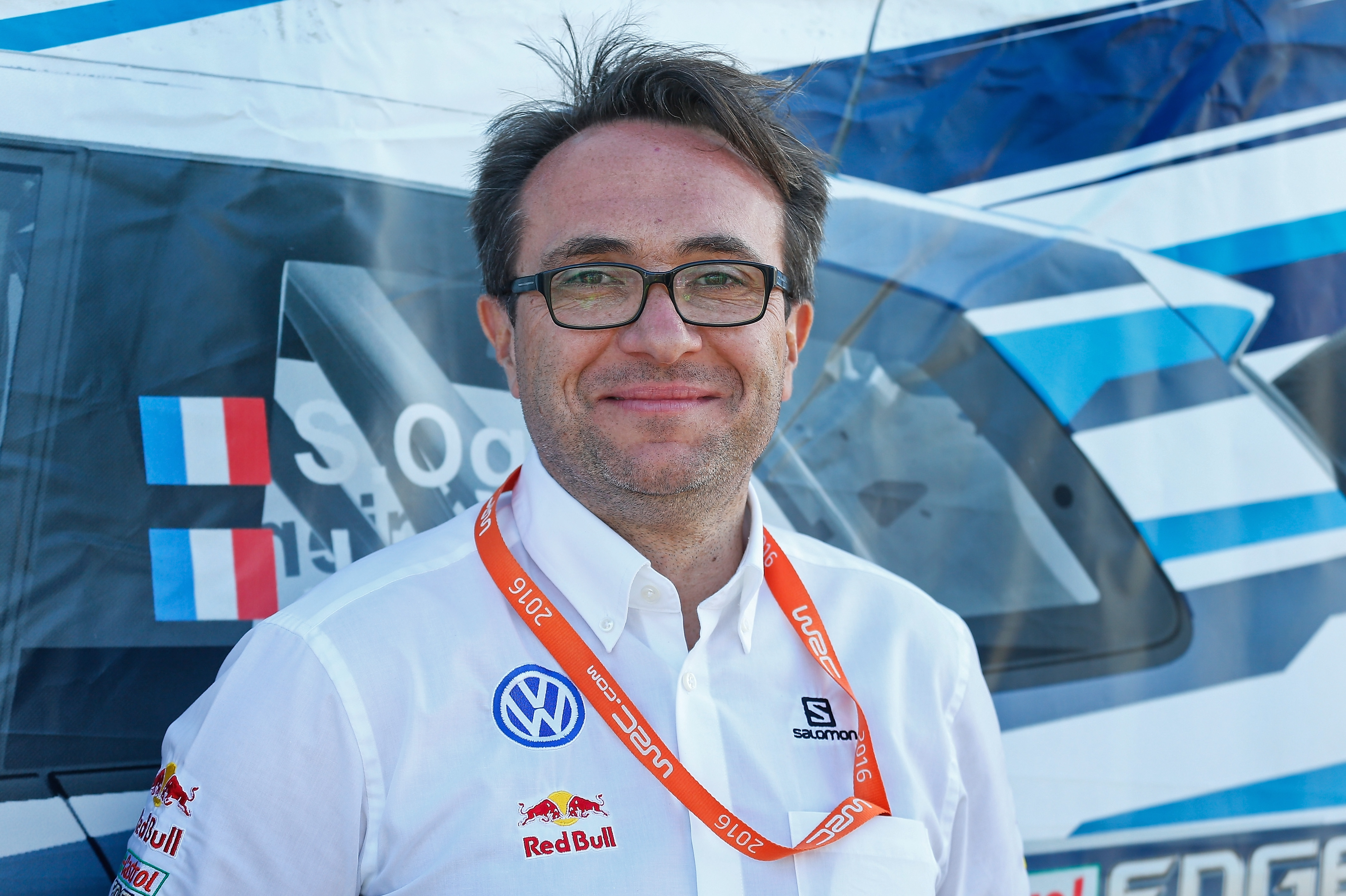
- Smeets in 2016

Personal information
- Nationality: Belgium
- Full name: Sven Hugo Smeets
- Born: 12 May 1972 (age 54)

World Rally Championship record
- Years active: 1995–2005
- Driver: (Belgium) Freddy Loix (Belgium) François Duval
- Teams: Mitsubishi, Hyundai, Peugeot, Citroën
- Rallies: 94
- Championships: 0
- Rally wins: 1
- Podiums: 7
- Stage wins: 42
- First rally: 1995 Rally de Portugal
- First win: 2005 Rally Australia
- Last win: 2005 Rally Australia
- Last rally: 2005 Rally Australia

Sven Hugo Smeets (born 12 May 1972) is a Belgian Formula One engineer and a former rally co-driver. He is currently the sporting director at the Williams Racing Formula One team, and is also the team principal of the Williams Driver Academy.

== Career ==
Smeets began his motorsport career in 1993 as a co-driver in rallying and became the navigator for Freddy Loix in 1995, with whom he achieved numerous successes with whilst competing in the World Rally Championship. 2005 saw the Belgian join Citroën as co-driver for François Duval, together winning the season's closing rally in Australia.

In 2008, Smeets made the decision to end his stint as a co-driver, but remained in rallying and subsequently became Team Manager for Citroën Racing, in a period which the French outfit claimed several Drivers' and Manufacturers' Championships. As the new team manager, he combined his duties in the Drivers' and Manufacturers' Championships with also becoming the Team Manager for the Peugeot Sport LMP1 programme. Seeking a new challenge Smeets moved to Germany to become Team Manager for Volkswagen Motorsport in 2012, ahead of their debut World Rally Championship entry in 2013.

2013 was a record breaking year for the German outfit, in which they secured the Drivers' and Manufacturers' Championships on first attempt and won 10 of the 13 rallies entered, hence ending Citroën's period of dominance. The team's unrivalled success continued over the next three years, winning Drivers' and Manufacturers' Championships in 2014, 2015 and 2016. Smeets continued his career at Volkswagen Motorsport, becoming Motorsport Director in 2016, a role he held for five years. In 2021 he left VW and joined Formula One team Williams Racing as Sporting Director, reuniting with his old boss Jost Capito.

In his current role, Smeets is responsible for the sporting governance and representation of the team in all sporting matters related to the FIA, other teams, and motorsport associations. He plays a key role in supporting the team's drivers, including being responsible for the Williams Racing Driver Academy, as well as having overall accountability for the race team.
