= Paavo Lukander =

Finnish rally co-driver (born 1961)

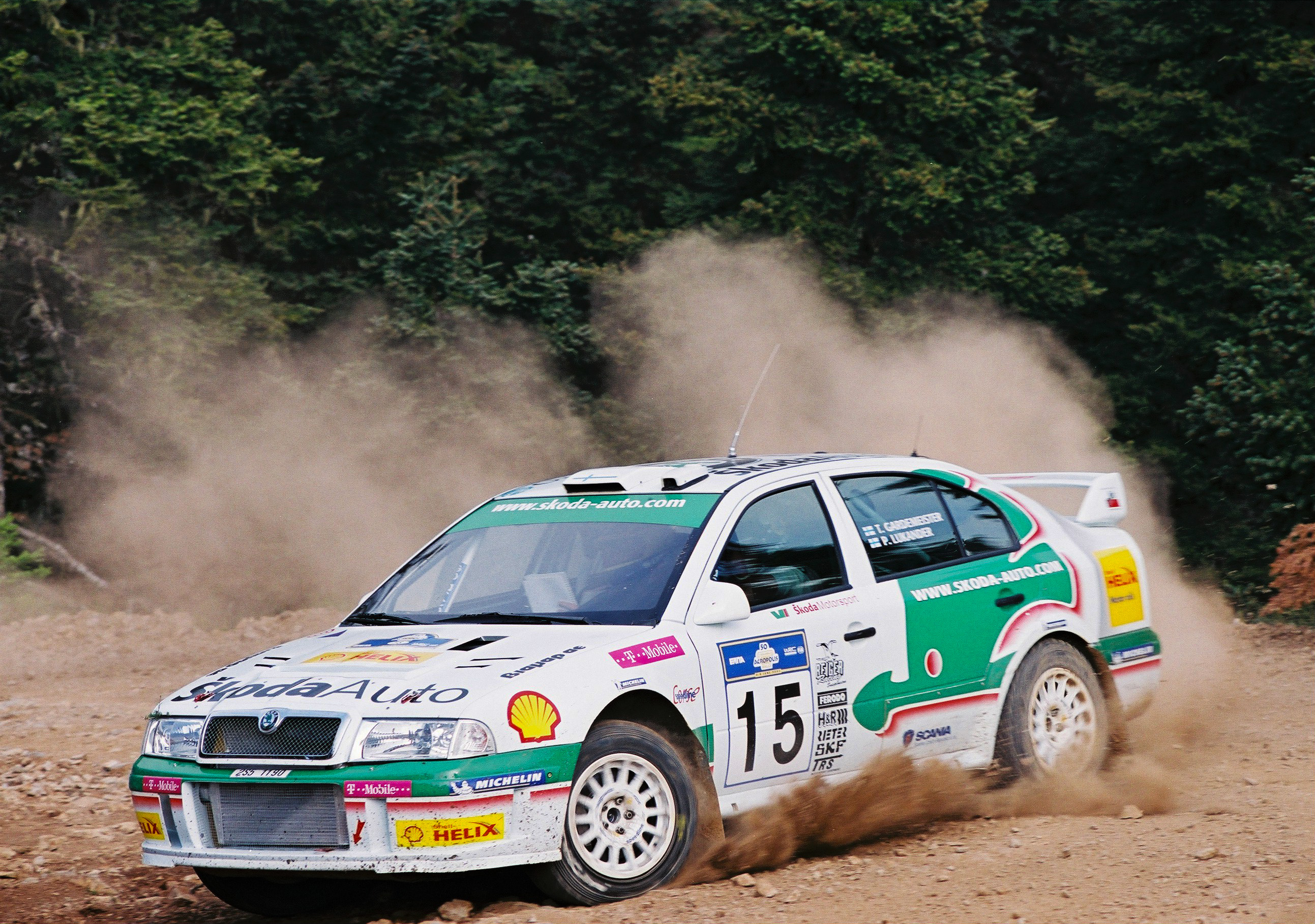
- Lukander at the 2003 Acropolis Rally.

Personal information
- Nationality: (Finland) Finnish
- Full name: Paavo Ensio Lukander
- Born: 26 March 1961 (age 65)

World Rally Championship record
- Years active: 1996–2004
- Driver: (Finland) Toni Gardemeister
- Teams: SEAT, Škoda
- Rallies: 70
- Championships: 0
- Rally wins: 0
- Podiums: 1
- Stage wins: 2
- First rally: 1996 1000 Lakes Rally
- Last rally: 2004 Rally Catalunya

Paavo Ensio Lukander (born 26 March 1961) is a Finnish former rally co-driver. Lukander worked as a map reader for Toni Gardemeister, with whom he remained active throughout his career. At the 1999 Ulster Rally, Lukander was injured when their car veered off the road.
