= Nicolas Bernardi =

French rally driver (born 1976)

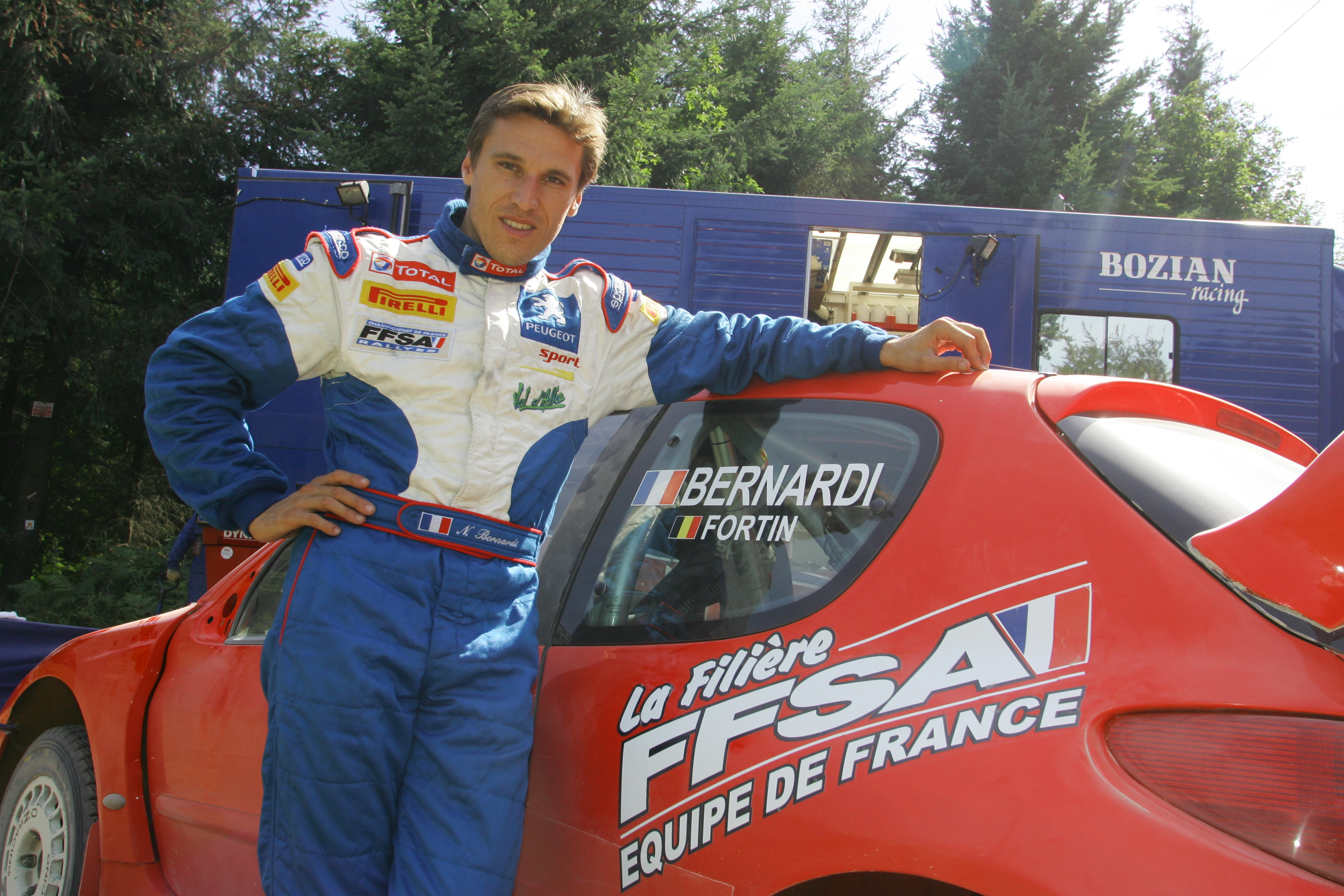
- Bernardi in 2005

Personal information
- Nationality: (France) French
- Born: 16 May 1976 (age 50)

World Rally Championship record
- Years active: 1998–2007
- Co-driver: (France) "Crack" (France) Rose-Marie Lenormand-Bassière (France) Jacques-Julien Renucci (France) Delphine Bernardi (France) Jean-Claude Grau (France) Bruno Brissart (France) Denis Giraudet (Belgium) Jean-Marc Fortin
- Teams: Peugeot, Suzuki
- Rallies: 23
- Championships: 0
- Rally wins: 0
- Podiums: 0
- Stage wins: 0
- Total points: 4
- First rally: 1998 Monte Carlo Rally
- Last rally: 2007 Tour de Corse

Nicolas Bernardi (born 16 May 1976) is a French rally driver.

Bernardi made his World Rally Championship (WRC) debut in 1998 on the Monte Carlo Rally. In 2001, he contested the Junior World Rally Championship in a Peugeot 206, later returning for a second campaign in 2004 in a Renault Clio and finishing second in the standings to Per-Gunnar Andersson.

In 2005, Bernaldi won the French tarmac championship in a Peugeot 206 WRC run by Bozian Racing. He contested the German and British rounds of the WRC in the same model of car, entered under the banner of 'Equipe de France FFSA', but he retired from both events. After Markko Märtin stepped down from the factory Peugeot following the death of his co-driver Michael Park on Rally GB, Bernardi replaced him in the second Peugeot 307 WRC on the asphalt events in France and Spain. He finished eighth in Corsica and then sixth in Catalunya.

Bernardi made one final WRC appearance on the 2007 Tour de Corse, driving the new Suzuki SX4 WRC on its first event.

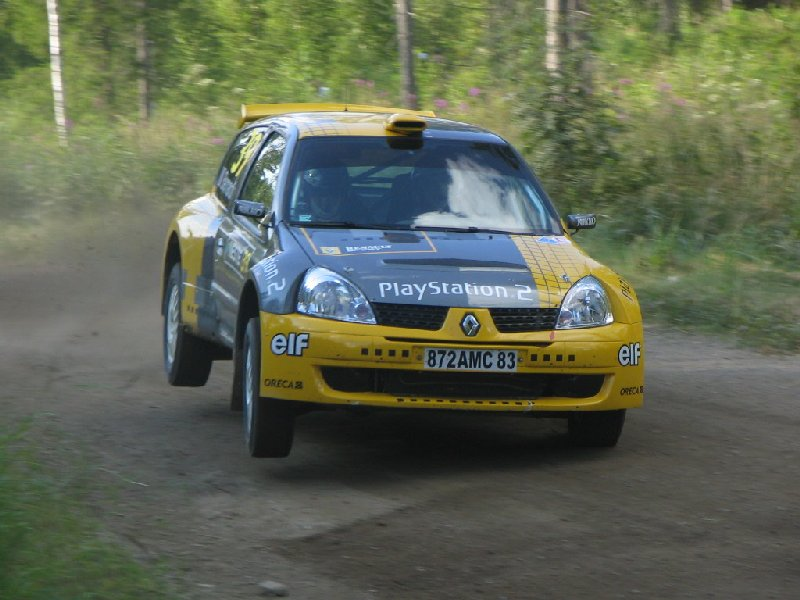
Bernardi during the 2004 Rally Finland.

== Complete World Rally Championship results ==
| Year | Entrant | Car | 1 | 2 | 3 | 4 | 5 | 6 | 7 | 8 | 9 | 10 | 11 | 12 | 13 | 14 | 15 | 16 | WDC | Points |
|---|---|---|---|---|---|---|---|---|---|---|---|---|---|---|---|---|---|---|---|---|
| 1998 | Nicolas Bernardi | Peugeot 106 Rallye | MON; Ret | SWE | KEN | POR | ESP | FRA | ARG | GRE | NZL | FIN | ITA | AUS | GBR | | | | NC | 0 |
| 1999 | Nicolas Bernardi | Peugeot 106 S16 | MON | SWE | KEN | POR | ESP | FRA; 31 | ARG | GRE | NZL | FIN | CHN | ITA | AUS | GBR | | | NC | 0 |
| 2000 | Nicolas Bernardi | Peugeot 106 Maxi | MON; 25 | SWE | KEN | POR | ESP | ARG | GRE | NZL | FIN | CYP | FRA | ITA | AUS | GBR | | | NC | 0 |
| 2001 | Team Gamma | Peugeot 206 S1600 | MON | SWE | POR | ESP; Ret | ARG | CYP | | | | | | | | | | | NC | 0 |
| 2001 | Nicolas Bernardi | Peugeot 206 S1600 | | | | | | | GRE; Ret | KEN | FIN; Ret | NZL | ITA; Ret | FRA; 21 | AUS | GBR; 35 | | | NC | 0 |
| 2003 | Nicolas Bernardi | Renault Clio S1600 | MON | SWE | TUR | NZL | ARG | GRE | CYP | GER | FIN | AUS | ITA; 13 | FRA | ESP; Ret | GBR | | | NC | 0 |
| 2004 | Nicolas Bernardi | Renault Clio S1600 | MON; 10 | SWE | MEX | NZL | CYP | GRE; 15 | TUR; Ret | ARG | FIN; 19 | GER | JPN | GBR; Ret | ITA; 15 | FRA | ESP; 14 | AUS | NC | 0 |
| 2005 | Equipe de France FFSA | Peugeot 206 WRC | MON | SWE | MEX | NZL | ITA | CYP | TUR | GRE | ARG | FIN | GER; Ret | GBR; Ret | JPN | | | | 20th | 4 |
| 2005 | Marlboro Peugeot Total | Peugeot 307 WRC | | | | | | | | | | | | | | FRA; 8 | ESP; 6 | AUS | 20th | 4 |
| 2007 | Suzuki World Rally Team | Suzuki SX4 WRC | MON | SWE | NOR | MEX | POR | ARG | ITA | GRE | FIN | GER | NZL | ESP | FRA; 31 | JPN | IRE | GBR | NC | 0 |

=== JWRC Results ===
| Year | Entrant | Car | 1 | 2 | 3 | 4 | 5 | 6 | 7 | JWRC | Points |
|---|---|---|---|---|---|---|---|---|---|---|---|
| 2001 | Team Gamma | Peugeot 206 S1600 | ESP; Ret | | | | | | | NC | 0 |
| 2001 | Nicolas Bernardi | Peugeot 206 S1600 | | GRE; Ret | FIN; Ret | ITA; Ret | FRA; 7 | GBR; 7 | | NC | 0 |
| 2004 | Nicolas Bernardi | Renault Clio S1600 | MON; 1 | GRE; 2 | TUR; Ret | FIN; 3 | GBR; Ret | ITA; 6 | ESP; 1 | 2nd | 37 |
