= Antony Warmbold =

German rally driver (born 1978)

Personal information
- Nationality: (Germany) German
- Born: 28 July 1978 (age 48)

World Rally Championship record
- Years active: 2001, 2003–2005
- Co-driver: (United Kingdom) Gemma Price (Republic of Ireland) Damien Connolly (United Kingdom) Michael Orr
- Teams: Ford
- Rallies: 47
- Championships: 0
- Rally wins: 0
- Podiums: 0
- Stage wins: 0
- Total points: 9
- First rally: 2000 Rally of Great Britain
- Last rally: 2005 Rally Australia

Antony Warmbold (born 28 July 1978) is a former German rally driver. He competed full-time in the World Rally Championship between 2003 and 2005, scoring seven points.

== Career ==
Warmbold is the son of former rally driver Achim Warmbold. Antony was co-driver for his father before switching to driving. In 2001, he contested three rounds of the World Rally Championship - two in a Toyota Corolla WRC and one in a Toyota Celica GT-Four. In 2002, he took part in the European Rally Championship, finishing seventh in the standings.

For 2003, Warmbold completed a deal to use a Ford Focus RS WRC on 12 of the 14 rallies on the WRC calendar. He scored a best finish of 11th on the first event of the season, the Monte Carlo Rally. In 2004 he entered all 16 rallies in a Focus, finishing eighth on Rally Turkey, Rally Japan and Rally d'Italia Sardegna. In 2005, he took part in all but one of the 16 rallies in a Focus RS WRC 04 entered by the Ford World Rally Team. He finished seventh three times; in Mexico, Italy and Spain. In 2006, Warmbold quit rallying after running out of funds.

== WRC results ==
=== As co-driver ===
| Year | Entrant | Car | 1 | 2 | 3 | 4 | 5 | 6 | 7 | 8 | 9 | 10 | 11 | 12 | 13 | 14 | WDC | Points |
|---|---|---|---|---|---|---|---|---|---|---|---|---|---|---|---|---|---|---|
| 2000 | Achim Warmbold | Toyota Corolla WRC | MON | SWE | KEN | POR | ESP | ARG | GRC | NZL | FIN | CYP | FRA | ITA | AUS | GBR; Ret | NC | 0 |

=== As driver ===
| Year | Entrant | Car | 1 | 2 | 3 | 4 | 5 | 6 | 7 | 8 | 9 | 10 | 11 | 12 | 13 | 14 | 15 | 16 | WDC | Points |
|---|---|---|---|---|---|---|---|---|---|---|---|---|---|---|---|---|---|---|---|---|
| 2001 | Anthony Warmbold | Toyota Corolla WRC | MON | SWE | POR; Ret | ESP | ARG | CYP | | | FIN; 50 | NZL | ITA | FRA | AUS | GBR | | | NC | 0 |
| 2001 | Anthony Warmbold | Toyota Celica GT-Four ST205 | | | | | | | GRE; Ret | KEN | | | | | | | | | NC | 0 |
| 2003 | AW Rally Team | Ford Focus RS WRC 02 | MON; 11 | SWE; 30 | TUR | NZL; 20 | ARG; 11 | GRE; 13 | CYP; Ret | GER; 19 | FIN; Ret | AUS; 14 | ITA | FRA; 14 | ESP; Ret | GBR; 13 | | | NC | 0 |
| 2004 | Ford Motor Co | Ford Focus RS WRC 02 | MON; Ret | | MEX; 9 | NZL; 19 | | | | | | | | | | | | | 25th | 3 |
| 2004 | M-Sport | Ford Focus RS WRC 02 | | SWE; 15 | | | | | | | | | | | | | | | 25th | 3 |
| 2004 | Anthony Warmbold | Ford Focus RS WRC 02 | | | | | CYP; Ret | GRE; 9 | TUR; 8 | ARG; 9 | FIN; Ret | GER; 13 | JAP; 8 | GBR; 10 | ITA; 8 | FRA; 20 | ESP; 13 | AUS; 14 | 25th | 3 |
| 2005 | BP Ford World Rally Team | Ford Focus RS WRC 04 | MON; 10 | SWE; 11 | MEX; 7 | NZL; 11 | ITA; 7 | CYP; Ret | TUR; 9 | GRE; Ret | ARG; 12 | FIN; Ret | GER | GBR; 12 | JAP; 9 | FRA; 13 | ESP; 7 | AUS; Ret | 18th | 6 |
