= Natalie Barratt =

British rally driver (born 1975)

- Nationality: (United Kingdom) British
- Born: 6 March 1975 (age 51) Manchester, England

Projekt E Series career
- Debut season: 2020
- Current team: Rallytechnology
- Car number: 41
- Starts: 2
- Wins: 0
- Podiums: 1
- Best finish: 1st in 2020
Natalie Barratt
World Rally Championship record
- Years active: 1998 – 2002, 2004 – 2006
- Co-driver: (United Kingdom) Stella Boyles (Norway) Elin Wolland (United Kingdom) Joanne Lockwood (United Kingdom) Roger Freeman (United Kingdom) Paul Morris (United Kingdom) Pauline Gullick (United Kingdom) Trevor Agnew (Australia) Claire Parker (United Kingdom) Chris Patterson (United Kingdom) Michael Gibson (United Kingdom) Carl Williamson (United Kingdom) John Bennie (Finland) Kaj Lindström (Australia) Dale Moscatt
- Teams: Mitsubishi; Subaru; Hyundai; MG; Renault
- Rallies: 44
- Championships: 0
- Rally wins: 0
- Podiums: 0
- Stage wins: 0
- Total points: 0
- First rally: 1998 Rally GB
- Last rally: 2006 Rally New Zealand

Natalie Barratt (born 6 March 1975) is a British racing driver. She has competed in the British Rally Championship and World Rally Championship. She took a break 2013 to focus on her family life (daughter Frances and son Magnus). She returned in 2020 to take part in Projekt E, winning the inaugural championship.

== Racing record ==
=== Complete WRC results ===
Year	Entrant	Car	1	2	3	4	5	6	7	8	9	10	11	12	13	14	15	16	WDC	Points
1998	Natalie Barratt	Mitsubishi Lancer Evo IV	MON	SWE	KEN	POR	ESP	FRA	ARG	GRC	NZL	FIN	ITA	AUS	GBR; 38				NC	0
1999	Natalie Barratt	Mitsubishi Lancer Evo VI	MON	SWE; 54	KEN	POR	ESP	FRA	ARG	GRC	NZL	FIN	CHN	ITA	AUS	GBR; 36			NC	0
2000	Natalie Barratt	Mitsubishi Lancer Evo VI	MON	SWE; DSQ	KEN	POR	ESP; 38	ARG	GRC	NZL	FIN; 39	CYP	FRA; 33	ITA		GBR; 36			NC	0
2000	Les Walkden Racing	Subaru Impreza 555													AUS; Ret				NC	0
2001	Barratt Rallysport	Mitsubishi Lancer Evo V	MON; 29	SWE; Ret	POR; 34	ESP	ARG												NC	0
2001	Barratt Rallysport	Mitsubishi Lancer Evo VI						CYP; 21	GRC; 35	KEN	FIN; 57	NZL; 36	ITA; Ret	FRA	AUS; 36	GBR; Ret			NC	0
2002	Barratt Rallysport	Mitsubishi Lancer Evo VI	MON	SWE; 51	FRA		CYP; 26	ARG											NC	0
2002	Barratt Rallysport	Hyundai Accent WRC				ESP; Ret			GRC; Ret	KEN	FIN	GER	ITA	NZL; 21	AUS; Ret	GBR; 22			NC	0
2004	Barratt Rallysport	MG ZR S1600	MON; Ret	SWE	MEX														NC	0
2004	Barratt Rallysport	Renault Clio S1600							TUR; Ret	ARG	FIN; 34	GER	JPN	GBR; Ret	ITA; 23	FRA	ESP; Ret	AUS	NC	0
2004	Reece Jones Rallysport	Mitsubishi Lancer Evo VIII				NZL; 32	CYP	GRC											NC	0
2005	OMV World Rally Team	Mitsubishi Lancer Evo VII	MON	SWE	MEX	NZL; 37	ITA												NC	0
2005	OMV World Rally Team	Mitsubishi Lancer Evo VIII						CYP; Ret	TUR; 46	GRC				GBR; 41	JPN; Ret	FRA	ESP	AUS; 34	NC	0
2005	Barratt Rallysport	Subaru Impreza STi									ARG; Ret	FIN; 30	GER						NC	0
2006	Barratt Rallysport	Subaru Impreza STi	MON	SWE	MEX	ESP	FRA	ARG	ITA	GRC	GER	FIN; 32	JPN	CYP	TUR	AUS			NC	0
2006	OMV CEE World Rally Team	Mitsubishi Lancer Evo IX															NZL; Ret	GBR	NC	0

=== Complete JWRC results ===
Year	Entrant	Car	1	2	3	4	5	6	7	Pos.	Points
2004	Risbridger Motorsport	MG ZR S1600	MON; Ret							NC	0
2004	Risbridger Motorsport	Renault Clio S1600		GRE; Ret	TUR; Ret	FIN; 10	GBR; Ret	ITA; 9	ESP; Ret	NC	0

=== Complete PWRC Results ===
Year	Entrant	Car	1	2	3	4	5	6	7	8	Pos.	Points
2005	OMV World Rally Team	Mitsubishi Lancer Evolution VII	SWE	NZL; 12					JPN; Ret	AUS; 11	16th	2
2005	OMV World Rally Team	Mitsubishi Lancer Evolution VIII			CYP; Ret	TUR; 15	ARG				16th	2
2005	OMV World Rally Team	Subaru Impreza WRX STI						GBR; 7			16th	2
2006	OMV CEE World Rally Team	Mitsubishi Lancer Evo VIII	MON	MEX	ARG	GRE	JPN	CYP	AUS	NZL; Ret	–	0

=== Complete FIA World Rallycross Championship results ===
(key)

==== Projekt E Series ====
Year	Entrant	Car	1	2	Pos.	Points
2020	Rallytechnology	Ford Fiesta	SWE; 2	LAT; 4	1st	35

== See also ==
- List of female World Rally Championship drivers
