= 2004 Rally of Turkey =

Rallying motorsport event

2004 Rally of Turkey 5th Rally of Turkey
Round 7 of the 2004 World Rally Championship season
← Previous event	Next event →
- Host country: Turkey
- Rally base: Antalya
- Dates run: June 24, 2004 – June 27, 2004
- Stages: 17 (383.33 km; 238.19 miles)
- Stage surface: Gravel
- Overall distance: 1,236.44 km (768.29 miles)

Statistics
- Crews: 65 at start, 32 at finish

Overall results
- Overall winner: (France) Sébastien Loeb (Monaco) Daniel Elena (France) Citroën Total; Citroën Xsara WRC

The 2004 Rally of Turkey (formally the 5th Rally of Turkey) was the seventh round of the 2004 World Rally Championship. The race was held over four days between 24 June and 27 June 2004, and was based in Antalya, Turkey. Citroën's Sébastien Loeb won the race, his 8th win in the World Rally Championship.

== Background ==
=== Entry list ===
No.	Driver	Co-Driver	Entrant	Car	Tyre
World Rally Championship manufacturer entries
1	(Norway) Petter Solberg	(United Kingdom) Phil Mills	(Japan) 555 Subaru World Rally Team	Subaru Impreza S10 WRC '04	P
2	(Finland) Mikko Hirvonen	(Finland) Jarmo Lehtinen	(Japan) 555 Subaru World Rally Team	Subaru Impreza S10 WRC '04	P
3	(France) Sébastien Loeb	(Monaco) Daniel Elena	(France) Citroën Total WRT	Citroën Xsara WRC	M
4	(Spain) Carlos Sainz	(Spain) Marc Martí	(France) Citroën Total WRT	Citroën Xsara WRC	M
5	(Finland) Marcus Grönholm	(Finland) Timo Rautiainen	(France) Marlboro Peugeot Total	Peugeot 307 WRC	M
6	(Finland) Harri Rovanperä	(Finland) Risto Pietiläinen	(France) Marlboro Peugeot Total	Peugeot 307 WRC	M
7	(Estonia) Markko Märtin	(United Kingdom) Michael Park	(United Kingdom) Ford Motor Co. Ltd.	Ford Focus RS WRC '04	M
8	(Belgium) François Duval	(Belgium) Stéphane Prévot	(United Kingdom) Ford Motor Co. Ltd.	Ford Focus RS WRC '04	M
9	(France) Gilles Panizzi	(France) Hervé Panizzi	(Japan) Mitsubishi Motors	Mitsubishi Lancer WRC 04	M
10	(Italy) Gianluigi Galli	(Italy) Guido D'Amore	(Japan) Mitsubishi Motors	Mitsubishi Lancer WRC 04	M
World Rally Championship entries
11	(Sweden) Daniel Carlsson	(Sweden) Matthias Andersson	(France) Bozian Racing	Peugeot 206 WRC	M
12	(Germany) Antony Warmbold	(United Kingdom) Gemma Price	(Germany) Antony Warmbold	Ford Focus RS WRC '02	M
13	(Norway) Henning Solberg	(Norway) Cato Menkerud	(France) Bozian Racing	Peugeot 206 WRC	M
14	(Finland) Janne Tuohino	(Finland) Jukka Aho	(Finland) Janne Tuohino	Ford Focus RS WRC '02	M
15	(United Kingdom) Alistair Ginley	(Republic of Ireland) Rory Kennedy	(United Kingdom) Alistair Ginley	Subaru Impreza S9 WRC '03	P
16	(Turkey) Serkan Yazici	(Turkey) Can Okan	(Turkey) Serkan Yazici	Ford Focus RS WRC '01	P
62	(Turkey) Murat Akdilek	(Turkey) Caglar Suren	(Turkey) Murat Akdilek	Hyundai Accent WRC	—N/a
63	(Turkey) Adnan Sarihan	(Turkey) Orhan Celen	(Turkey) Adnan Sarihan	Ford Focus RS WRC '01	—N/a
64	(Turkey) Ender Alkoclar	(Turkey) Ismet Özbakir	(Turkey) Ender Alkoclar	Hyundai Accent WRC	—N/a
65	(Turkey) Ali Ersin	(Turkey) Ahmet Yoruk	(Turkey) Ali Ersin	Mitsubishi Lancer Evo VI	—N/a
JWRC entries
31	(San Marino) Mirco Baldacci	(Italy) Giovanni Bernacchini	(Japan) Suzuki Sport	Suzuki Ignis S1600	P
32	(Estonia) Urmo Aava	(Estonia) Kuldar Sikk	(Japan) Suzuki Sport	Suzuki Ignis S1600	P
33	(United Kingdom) Guy Wilks	(United Kingdom) Phil Pugh	(Japan) Suzuki Sport	Suzuki Ignis S1600	P
34	(San Marino) Alessandro Broccoli	(Italy) Giovanni Agnese	(San Marino) Sab Motorsport	Fiat Punto S1600	P
35	(Finland) Kosti Katajamäki	(Finland) Timo Alanne	(Japan) Suzuki Sport	Suzuki Ignis S1600	P
36	(United Kingdom) Kris Meeke	(United Kingdom) Chris Patterson	(United Kingdom) McRae Motorsport	Opel Corsa S1600	P
37	(Italy) Luca Cecchettini	(Italy) Nicola Arena	(Italy) Autorel Sport	Renault Clio S1600	P
39	(France) Nicolas Bernardi	(Belgium) Jean-Marc Fortin	(France) Renault Sport	Renault Clio S1600	P
40	(France) Guerlain Chicherit	(France) Mathieu Baumel	(France) Citroën Total	Citroën Saxo S1600	P
41	(United Kingdom) Natalie Barratt	(United Kingdom) Carl Williamson	(United Kingdom) Risbridger Motorsport	Renault Clio S1600	P
42	(France) Mathieu Biasion	(France) Eric Domenech	(Italy) H.F. Grifone SRL	Fiat Punto S1600	P
43	(Finland) Jari-Matti Latvala	(Finland) Miikka Anttila	(Italy) Astra Racing	Ford Fiesta S1600	P
44	(Italy) Alan Scorcioni	(Italy) Massimo Daddoveri	(Italy) H.F. Grifone SRL	Fiat Punto S1600	P
45	(Sweden) Per-Gunnar Andersson	(Sweden) Jonas Andersson	(Japan) Suzuki Sport	Suzuki Ignis S1600	P
46	(Spain) Xavier Pons	(Spain) Oriol Julià Pascual	(Spain) RACC Motor Sport	Fiat Punto S1600	P
47	(Italy) Luca Tabaton	(Italy) Gisella Rovegno	(Italy) H.F. Grifone SRL	Fiat Punto S1600	P
48	(Zimbabwe) Conrad Rautenbach	(Zimbabwe) Timothy Sturla	(United Kingdom) Birkbeck Rallysport	Opel Corsa S1600	P
49	(Italy) Luca Betti	(Italy) Michele Rosso	(Italy) Meteco Corse	Peugeot 206 S1600	P
50	(United Kingdom) Oliver Marshall	(United Kingdom) Craig Parry	(United Kingdom) Prospeed Motorsport	Renault Clio S1600	P
51	(Belgium) Larry Cols	(Belgium) Filip Goddé	(France) Renault Sport	Renault Clio S1600	P

=== Itinerary ===
All dates and times are EEST (UTC+3).

Date	Time	No.	Stage name	Distance
Leg 1 — 151.83 km
24 June	18:46	SS1	Efes Pilsen SSS	2.50 km
25 June	08:38	SS2	Phaselis 1	28.98 km
25 June	09:21	SS3	Silyon 1	34.24 km
25 June	13:02	SS4	Phaselis 2	28.98 km
25 June	14:05	SS5	Kemer 1	20.39 km
25 June	16:41	SS6	Silyon 2	34.24 km
25 June	18:52	SS7	Castrol SSS	2.50 km
Leg 2 — 153.60 km
26 June	08:50	SS8	Perge 1	22.28 km
26 June	09:36	SS9	Kumluca 1	36.10 km
26 June	13:22	SS10	Perge 2	22.28 km
26 June	14:05	SS11	Kumluca 2	36.10 km
26 June	17:41	SS12	Chimera	16.45 km
26 June	18:29	SS13	Kemer 2	20.39 km
Leg 3 — 77.90 km
27 June	07:48	SS14	Olympos 1	33.35 km
27 June	09:06	SS15	Aspendos 1	5.60 km
27 June	11:47	SS16	Olympos 2	33.35 km
27 June	13:05	SS17	Aspendos 2	5.60 km

== Results ==
=== Overall ===
Pos.	No.	Driver	Co-driver	Team	Car	Time	Difference	Points
1	3	(France) Sébastien Loeb	(Monaco) Daniel Elena	(France) Citroën Total WRT	Citroën Xsara WRC	4:48:26.8		10
2	5	(Finland) Marcus Grönholm	(Finland) Timo Rautiainen	(France) Marlboro Peugeot Total	Peugeot 307 WRC	4:48:53.0	+26.2	8
3	1	(Norway) Petter Solberg	(United Kingdom) Phil Mills	(Japan) 555 Subaru World Rally Team	Subaru Impreza S10 WRC '04	4:49:03.5	+36.7	6
4	4	(Spain) Carlos Sainz	(Spain) Marc Martí	(France) Citroën Total WRT	Citroën Xsara WRC	4:51:16.1	+2:49.3	5
5	8	(Belgium) François Duval	(Belgium) Stéphane Prévot	(United Kingdom) Ford Motor Co. Ltd.	Ford Focus RS WRC '04	4:52:53.6	+6:26.8	4
6	2	(Finland) Mikko Hirvonen	(Finland) Jarmo Lehtinen	(Japan) 555 Subaru World Rally Team	Subaru Impreza S10 WRC '04	4:54:27.9	+6:01.1	3
7	14	(Finland) Janne Tuohino	(Finland) Jukka Aho	(Finland) Janne Tuohino	Ford Focus RS WRC '02	5:00:11.7	+11:44.9	2
8	12	(Germany) Antony Warmbold	(United Kingdom) Gemma Price	(Germany) Antony Warmbold	Ford Focus RS WRC '02	5:09:42.1	+21:15.3	1

=== World Rally Cars ===
==== Classification ====
Position		No.	Driver	Co-driver	Entrant	Car	Time	Difference	Points
Event	Class	No.	Driver	Co-driver	Entrant	Car	Time	Difference	Points
1	1	3	(France) Sébastien Loeb	(Monaco) Daniel Elena	(France) Citroën Total WRT	Citroën Xsara WRC	4:48:26.8		10
2	2	5	(Finland) Marcus Grönholm	(Finland) Timo Rautiainen	(France) Marlboro Peugeot Total	Peugeot 307 WRC	4:48:53.0	+26.2	8
3	3	1	(Norway) Petter Solberg	(United Kingdom) Phil Mills	(Japan) 555 Subaru World Rally Team	Subaru Impreza S10 WRC '04	4:49:03.5	+36.7	6
4	4	4	(Spain) Carlos Sainz	(Spain) Marc Martí	(France) Citroën Total WRT	Citroën Xsara WRC	4:51:16.1	+2:49.3	5
5	5	8	(Belgium) François Duval	(Belgium) Stéphane Prévot	(United Kingdom) Ford Motor Co. Ltd.	Ford Focus RS WRC '04	4:52:53.6	+6:26.8	4
6	6	2	(Finland) Mikko Hirvonen	(Finland) Jarmo Lehtinen	(Japan) 555 Subaru World Rally Team	Subaru Impreza S10 WRC '04	4:54:27.9	+6:01.1	3
10	7	10	(Italy) Gianluigi Galli	(Italy) Guido D'Amore	(Japan) Mitsubishi Motors	Mitsubishi Lancer WRC 04	5:20:35.7	+32:08.9	0
24	8	7	(Estonia) Markko Märtin	(United Kingdom) Michael Park	(United Kingdom) Ford Motor Co. Ltd.	Ford Focus RS WRC '04	5:44:58.7	+56:31.9	0
Retired SS13		6	(Finland) Harri Rovanperä	(Finland) Risto Pietiläinen	(France) Marlboro Peugeot Total	Peugeot 307 WRC	Gearbox		0
Retired SS4		9	(France) Gilles Panizzi	(France) Hervé Panizzi	(Japan) Mitsubishi Motors	Mitsubishi Lancer WRC 04	Electrical		0

==== Special stages ====
Day	Stage	Stage name	Length	Winner	Car	Time	Class leaders
Leg 1 (24 Jun)	SS1	Efes Pilsen SSS	2.50 km	(Estonia) Markko Märtin	Ford Focus RS WRC '04	2:12.4	(Estonia) Markko Märtin
Leg 1 (25 Jun)	SS2	Phaselis 1	28.98 km	(France) Sébastien Loeb	Citroën Xsara WRC	22:49.2	(France) Sébastien Loeb
Leg 1 (25 Jun)	SS3	Silyon 1	34.24 km	(France) Sébastien Loeb	Citroën Xsara WRC	25:57.2	(France) Sébastien Loeb
Leg 1 (25 Jun)	SS4	Phaselis 2	28.98 km	(Finland) Harri Rovanperä	Peugeot 307 WRC	22:41.3	(France) Sébastien Loeb
Leg 1 (25 Jun)	SS5	Kemer 1	20.39 km	(Spain) Carlos Sainz	Citroën Xsara WRC	14:46.5	(France) Sébastien Loeb
Leg 1 (25 Jun)	SS6	Silyon 2	34.24 km	(Finland) Marcus Grönholm	Peugeot 307 WRC	26:03.6	(France) Sébastien Loeb
Leg 1 (25 Jun)	SS7	Castrol SSS	2.50 km	(Norway) Petter Solberg	Subaru Impreza S10 WRC '04	2:14.8	(France) Sébastien Loeb
Leg 2 (26 Jun)	SS8	Perge 1	22.28 km	(France) Sébastien Loeb	Citroën Xsara WRC	15:16.2	(France) Sébastien Loeb
Leg 2 (26 Jun)	SS9	Kumluca 1	36.10 km	(Finland) Marcus Grönholm	Peugeot 307 WRC	28:09.7	(France) Sébastien Loeb
Leg 2 (26 Jun)	SS10	Perge 2	22.28 km	(France) Sébastien Loeb	Citroën Xsara WRC	15:03.9	(France) Sébastien Loeb
Leg 2 (26 Jun)	SS11	Kumluca 2	36.10 km	(France) Sébastien Loeb	Citroën Xsara WRC	27:39.1	(France) Sébastien Loeb
Leg 2 (26 Jun)	SS12	Chimera	16.45 km	(Norway) Petter Solberg	Subaru Impreza S10 WRC '04	11:54.8	(France) Sébastien Loeb
Leg 2 (26 Jun)	SS13	Kemer 2	20.39 km	(Norway) Petter Solberg	Subaru Impreza S10 WRC '04	14:18.2	(France) Sébastien Loeb
Leg 3 (27 Jun)	SS14	Olympos 1	33.35 km	(Finland) Marcus Grönholm	Peugeot 307 WRC	25:17.9	(France) Sébastien Loeb
Leg 3 (27 Jun)	SS15	Aspendos 1	5.60 km	(Norway) Petter Solberg	Subaru Impreza S10 WRC '04	3:52.8	(France) Sébastien Loeb
Leg 3 (27 Jun)	SS16	Olympos 2	33.35 km	(Norway) Petter Solberg	Subaru Impreza S10 WRC '04	25:00.3	(France) Sébastien Loeb
Leg 3 (27 Jun)	SS17	Aspendos 2	5.60 km	(Norway) Petter Solberg	Subaru Impreza S10 WRC '04	3:52.4	(France) Sébastien Loeb

==== Championship standings ====
Pos.	Drivers' championships			Co-drivers' championships			Manufacturers' championships		
Pos.	Move	Driver	Points	Move	Co-driver	Points	Move	Manufacturer	Points
1		(France) Sébastien Loeb	53		(Monaco) Daniel Elena	53		(France) Citroën Total WRT	80
2		(Norway) Petter Solberg	44		(United Kingdom) Phil Mills	44		(United Kingdom) Ford Motor Co. Ltd.	65
3		(Estonia) Markko Märtin	34		(United Kingdom) Michael Park	34		(Japan) 555 Subaru World Rally Team	59
4		(Finland) Marcus Grönholm	32		(Finland) Timo Rautiainen	32		(France) Marlboro Peugeot Total	47
5	1	(Spain) Carlos Sainz	24	1	(Spain) Marc Martí	24		(Japan) Mitsubishi Motors	11

=== Junior World Rally Championship ===
==== Classification ====
Position		No.	Driver	Co-driver	Entrant	Car	Time	Difference	Points
Event	Class	No.	Driver	Co-driver	Entrant	Car	Time	Difference	Points
11	1	45	(Sweden) Per-Gunnar Andersson	(Sweden) Jonas Andersson	(Japan) Suzuki Sport	Suzuki Ignis S1600	5:24:56.2		10
12	2	35	(Finland) Kosti Katajamäki	(Finland) Timo Alanne	(Japan) Suzuki Sport	Suzuki Ignis S1600	5:25:02.6	+6.4	8
13	3	33	(United Kingdom) Guy Wilks	(United Kingdom) Phil Pugh	(Japan) Suzuki Sport	Suzuki Ignis S1600	5:25:53.8	+57.6	6
14	4	40	(France) Guerlain Chicherit	(France) Mathieu Baumel	(France) Citroën Total	Citroën Saxo S1600	5:27:54.9	+2:58.7	5
16	5	32	(Estonia) Urmo Aava	(Estonia) Kuldar Sikk	(Japan) Suzuki Sport	Suzuki Ignis S1600	5:28:42.9	+3:46.7	4
17	6	31	(San Marino) Mirco Baldacci	(Italy) Giovanni Bernacchini	(Japan) Suzuki Sport	Suzuki Ignis S1600	5:30:31.9	+5:35.7	3
22	7	48	(Zimbabwe) Conrad Rautenbach	(Zimbabwe) Timothy Sturla	(United Kingdom) Birkbeck Rallysport	Opel Corsa S1600	5:39:27.0	+14:30.8	2
28	8	50	(United Kingdom) Oliver Marshall	(United Kingdom) Craig Parry	(United Kingdom) Prospeed Motorsport	Renault Clio S1600	6:03:10.4	+38:14.2	1
Retired SS12		39	(France) Nicolas Bernardi	(Belgium) Jean-Marc Fortin	(France) Renault Sport	Renault Clio S1600	Suspension		0
Retired SS10		34	(San Marino) Alessandro Broccoli	(Italy) Giovanni Agnese	(San Marino) Sab Motorsport	Fiat Punto S1600	Gearbox		0
Retired SS10		46	(Spain) Xavier Pons	(Spain) Oriol Julià Pascual	(Spain) RACC Motor Sport	Fiat Punto S1600	Engine		0
Retired SS9		37	(Italy) Luca Cecchettini	(Italy) Nicola Arena	(Italy) Autorel Sport	Renault Clio S1600	Suspension		0
Retired SS6		44	(Italy) Alan Scorcioni	(Italy) Massimo Daddoveri	(Italy) H.F. Grifone SRL	Fiat Punto S1600	Lost wheel		0
Retired SS4		41	(United Kingdom) Natalie Barratt	(United Kingdom) Carl Williamson	(United Kingdom) Risbridger Motorsport	Renault Clio S1600	Electrical		0
Retired SS4		43	(Finland) Jari-Matti Latvala	(Finland) Miikka Anttila	(Italy) Astra Racing	Ford Fiesta S1600	Radiator		0
Retired SS4		51	(Belgium) Larry Cols	(Belgium) Filip Goddé	(France) Renault Sport	Renault Clio S1600	Engine		0
Retired SS3		36	(United Kingdom) Kris Meeke	(United Kingdom) Chris Patterson	(United Kingdom) McRae Motorsport	Opel Corsa S1600	Transmission		0
Retired SS3		42	(France) Mathieu Biasion	(France) Eric Domenech	(Italy) H.F. Grifone SRL	Fiat Punto S1600	Alternatro		0
Retired SS3		47	(Italy) Luca Tabaton	(Italy) Gisella Rovegno	(Italy) H.F. Grifone SRL	Fiat Punto S1600	Accident		0
Retired SS2		49	(Italy) Luca Betti	(Italy) Michele Rosso	(Italy) Meteco Corse	Peugeot 206 S1600	Accident		0

==== Special stages ====
Day	Stage	Stage name	Length	Winner	Car	Time	Class leaders
Leg 1 (24 Jun)	SS1	Efes Pilsen SSS	2.50 km	(San Marino) Mirco Baldacci	Suzuki Ignis S1600	2:22.2	(San Marino) Mirco Baldacci
Leg 1 (25 Jun)	SS2	Phaselis 1	28.98 km	(France) Guerlain Chicherit	Citroën Saxo S1600	25:31.8	(France) Guerlain Chicherit
Leg 1 (25 Jun)	SS3	Silyon 1	34.24 km	(San Marino) Alessandro Broccoli	Fiat Punto S1600	28:59.5	(France) Guerlain Chicherit
Leg 1 (25 Jun)	SS4	Phaselis 2	28.98 km	(San Marino) Mirco Baldacci	Suzuki Ignis S1600	25:14.0	(France) Guerlain Chicherit
Leg 1 (25 Jun)	SS5	Kemer 1	20.39 km	(San Marino) Alessandro Broccoli	Fiat Punto S1600	16:03.5	(France) Guerlain Chicherit
Leg 1 (25 Jun)	SS6	Silyon 2	34.24 km	(San Marino) Mirco Baldacci	Suzuki Ignis S1600	28:38.5	(San Marino) Mirco Baldacci
Leg 1 (25 Jun)	SS7	Castrol SSS	2.50 km	(France) Nicolas Bernardi	Renault Clio S1600	2:25.2	(San Marino) Mirco Baldacci
Leg 2 (26 Jun)	SS8	Perge 1	22.28 km	(United Kingdom) Guy Wilks	Suzuki Ignis S1600	16:48.7	(San Marino) Mirco Baldacci
Leg 2 (26 Jun)	SS9	Kumluca 1	36.10 km	(San Marino) Mirco Baldacci	Suzuki Ignis S1600	30:48.7	(San Marino) Mirco Baldacci
Leg 2 (26 Jun)	SS10	Perge 2	22.28 km	(France) Nicolas Bernardi	Renault Clio S1600	16:44.5	(San Marino) Mirco Baldacci
Leg 2 (26 Jun)	SS11	Kumluca 2	36.10 km	(United Kingdom) Guy Wilks	Suzuki Ignis S1600	31:20.0	(San Marino) Mirco Baldacci
Leg 2 (26 Jun)	SS12	Chimera	16.45 km	(Sweden) Per-Gunnar Andersson	Suzuki Ignis S1600	13:32.4	(San Marino) Mirco Baldacci
Leg 2 (26 Jun)	SS13	Kemer 2	20.39 km	(United Kingdom) Guy Wilks	Suzuki Ignis S1600	16:07.0	(San Marino) Mirco Baldacci
Leg 3 (27 Jun)	SS14	Olympos 1	33.35 km	(United Kingdom) Guy Wilks	Suzuki Ignis S1600	28:08.1	(Sweden) Per-Gunnar Andersson
Leg 3 (27 Jun)	SS15	Aspendos 1	5.60 km	(Finland) Kosti Katajamäki	Suzuki Ignis S1600	4:14.2	(Sweden) Per-Gunnar Andersson
Leg 3 (27 Jun)	SS16	Olympos 2	33.35 km	(United Kingdom) Guy Wilks	Suzuki Ignis S1600	27:49.4	(Sweden) Per-Gunnar Andersson
Leg 3 (27 Jun)	SS17	Aspendos 2	5.60 km	(Finland) Kosti Katajamäki	Suzuki Ignis S1600	4:13.0	(Sweden) Per-Gunnar Andersson

==== Championship standings ====
Pos.	Drivers' championships		
Pos.	Move	Driver	Points
1		(France) Nicolas Bernardi	18
2		(United Kingdom) Guy Wilks	16
3	1	(Estonia) Urmo Aava	12
4	7	(Sweden) Per-Gunnar Andersson	11
5	2	(Belgium) Larry Cols	9
