= 2004 Rally d'Italia Sardegna =

13th round of the 2004 World Rally Championship

2004 Rally d'Italia Sardegna 1st Supermag Rally Italia Sardinia
Round 13 of the 2004 World Rally Championship season
← Previous event	Next event →
- Host country: Italy
- Rally base: Olbia
- Dates run: October 1, 2004 – October 3, 2004
- Stages: 19 (383.23 km; 238.13 miles)
- Stage surface: Gravel
- Overall distance: 1,228.92 km (763.62 miles)

Statistics
- Crews: 67 at start, 29 at finish

Overall results
- Overall winner: (Norway) Petter Solberg (United Kingdom) Phil Mills (Japan) 555 Subaru World Rally Team; Subaru Impreza S10 WRC '04

The 2004 Rally d'Italia Sardegna (formally the 1st Supermag Rally Italia Sardinia) was the thirteenth round of the 2004 World Rally Championship season. The race was held over three days between 1 October and 3 October 2004, and was based in Olbia, Italy. Subaru's Petter Solberg won the race, his 10th win in the World Rally Championship and 3rd in a row.

== Background ==
=== Entry list ===
No.	Driver	Co-Driver	Entrant	Car	Tyre
World Rally Championship manufacturer entries
1	(Norway) Petter Solberg	(United Kingdom) Phil Mills	(Japan) 555 Subaru World Rally Team	Subaru Impreza S10 WRC '04	P
2	(Finland) Mikko Hirvonen	(Finland) Jarmo Lehtinen	(Japan) 555 Subaru World Rally Team	Subaru Impreza S10 WRC '04	P
3	(France) Sébastien Loeb	(Monaco) Daniel Elena	(France) Citroën Total WRT	Citroën Xsara WRC	MI
4	(Spain) Carlos Sainz	(Spain) Marc Martí	(France) Citroën Total WRT	Citroën Xsara WRC	MI
5	(Finland) Marcus Grönholm	(Finland) Timo Rautiainen	(France) Marlboro Peugeot Total	Peugeot 307 WRC	MI
6	(Finland) Harri Rovanperä	(Finland) Risto Pietiläinen	(France) Marlboro Peugeot Total	Peugeot 307 WRC	MI
7	(Estonia) Markko Märtin	(United Kingdom) Michael Park	(United Kingdom) Ford Motor Co. Ltd.	Ford Focus RS WRC '04	MI
8	(Belgium) François Duval	(Belgium) Stéphane Prévot	(United Kingdom) Ford Motor Co. Ltd.	Ford Focus RS WRC '04	MI
World Rally Championship entries
11	(Germany) Armin Schwarz	(Germany) Manfred Hiemer	(Czech Republic) Škoda Motorsport	Škoda Fabia WRC	MI
12	(Finland) Toni Gardemeister	(Finland) Paavo Lukander	(Czech Republic) Škoda Motorsport	Škoda Fabia WRC	MI
14	(Argentina) Luís Pérez Companc	(Argentina) Jose Maria Volta	(France) Bozian Racing	Peugeot 206 WRC	MI
15	(Finland) Juuso Pykälistö	(Finland) Mika Ovaskainen	(France) Kronos Racing	Citroën Xsara WRC	—N/a
16	(Germany) Antony Warmbold	(United Kingdom) Gemma Price	(Germany) Antony Warmbold	Ford Focus RS WRC '02	MI
18	(Norway) Henning Solberg	(Norway) Cato Menkerud	(France) Bozian Racing	Peugeot 206 WRC	MI
19	(Italy) Andrea Navarra	(Italy) Simona Fedeli	(Italy) Andrea Navarra	Subaru Impreza S9 WRC '03	P
21	(France) Nicolas Vouilloz	(France) Denis Giraudet	(France) Bozian Racing	Peugeot 206 WRC	MI
23	(Hungary) Balázs Benik	(Hungary) Bence Rácz	(Hungary) Balázs Benik	Ford Focus RS WRC '02	P
25	(Italy) Pier Lorenzo Zanchi	(Italy) Dario D'Esposito	(Italy) Pier Lorenzo Zanchi	Toyota Corolla WRC	Y
JWRC entries
31	(San Marino) Mirco Baldacci	(Italy) Giovanni Bernacchini	(Japan) Suzuki Sport	Suzuki Ignis S1600	P
32	(Estonia) Urmo Aava	(Estonia) Kuldar Sikk	(Japan) Suzuki Sport	Suzuki Ignis S1600	P
33	(United Kingdom) Guy Wilks	(United Kingdom) Phil Pugh	(Japan) Suzuki Sport	Suzuki Ignis S1600	P
34	(San Marino) Alessandro Broccoli	(Italy) Giovanni Agnese	(San Marino) Sab Motorsport	Fiat Punto S1600	P
35	(Finland) Kosti Katajamäki	(Finland) Timo Alanne	(Japan) Suzuki Sport	Suzuki Ignis S1600	P
36	(United Kingdom) Kris Meeke	(United Kingdom) David Senior	(United Kingdom) McRae Motorsport	Opel Corsa S1600	P
37	(Italy) Luca Cecchettini	(Italy) Nicola Arena	(Italy) Autorel Sport	Renault Clio S1600	P
39	(France) Nicolas Bernardi	(Belgium) Jean-Marc Fortin	(France) Renault Sport	Renault Clio S1600	P
40	(France) Guerlain Chicherit	(France) Mathieu Baumel	(France) Citroën Total	Citroën Saxo S1600	P
41	(United Kingdom) Natalie Barratt	(United Kingdom) Carl Williamson	(United Kingdom) Risbridger Motorsport	Renault Clio S1600	P
42	(France) Mathieu Biasion	(France) Eric Domenech	(Italy) Power Car Team	Renault Clio S1600	P
43	(Finland) Jari-Matti Latvala	(Finland) Miikka Anttila	(Japan) Suzuki Sport	Suzuki Ignis S1600	P
44	(Italy) Alan Scorcioni	(Italy) Fulvio Florean	(Italy) H.F. Grifone SRL	Fiat Punto S1600	P
45	(Sweden) Per-Gunnar Andersson	(Sweden) Jonas Andersson	(Japan) Suzuki Sport	Suzuki Ignis S1600	P
46	(Spain) Xavier Pons	(Spain) Oriol Julià Pascual	(Spain) RACC Motor Sport	Fiat Punto S1600	P
47	(Italy) Luca Tabaton	(Italy) Gisella Rovegno	(Italy) H.F. Grifone SRL	Fiat Punto S1600	P
48	(Zimbabwe) Conrad Rautenbach	(United Kingdom) Mark Jones	(United Kingdom) Birkbeck Rallysport	Suzuki Ignis S1600	P
49	(Italy) Luca Betti	(Italy) Michele Rosso	(Italy) Meteco Corse	Fiat Punto S1600	P
50	(United Kingdom) Oliver Marshall	(United Kingdom) Craig Parry	(United Kingdom) Prospeed Motorsport	Renault Clio S1600	P
51	(Belgium) Larry Cols	(Belgium) Filip Goddé	(France) Renault Sport	Renault Clio S1600	P
Other notable entries
70	(Italy) Gianluigi Galli	(Italy) Guido D'Amore	(Italy) Gianluigi Galli	Mitsubishi Lancer Evo VIII	P

=== Itinerary ===
All dates and times are CEST (UTC+2).

Date	Time	No.	Stage name	Distance
Leg 1 — 158.56 km
1 October	09:12	SS1	Tantariles 1	28.69 km
1 October	10:21	SS2	Loelle 1	27.45 km
1 October	11:00	SS3	Tepilora 1	23.14 km
1 October	14:21	SS4	Tantariles 2	28.69 km
1 October	15:30	SS5	Loelle 2	27.45 km
1 October	16:09	SS6	Tepilora 2	23.14 km
Leg 2 — 147.99 km
2 October	08:51	SS7	Sas Molas 1	28.62 km
2 October	09:39	SS8	Le Sughere 1	9.06 km
2 October	10:31	SS9	Tandalò 1	34.21 km
2 October	14:01	SS10	Lovia Avra	4.21 km
2 October	15:06	SS11	Sas Molas 2	28.62 km
2 October	15:51	SS12	Le Sughere 2	9.06 km
2 October	16:43	SS13	Tandalò 2	34.21 km
Leg 3 — 76.68 km
3 October	09:13	SS14	Limbara 1	18.10 km
3 October	09:49	SS15	Terramala 1	11.59 km
3 October	10:38	SS16	Monti di Deu 1	8.65 km
3 October	11:36	SS17	Limbara 2	18.10 km
3 October	12:09	SS18	Terramala 2	11.59 km
3 October	12:58	SS19	Monti di Deu 2	8.65 km

== Results ==
=== Overall ===
Pos.	No.	Driver	Co-driver	Team	Car	Time	Difference	Points
1	1	(Norway) Petter Solberg	(United Kingdom) Phil Mills	(Japan) 555 Subaru World Rally Team	Subaru Impreza S10 WRC '04	4:43:47.9		10
2	3	(France) Sébastien Loeb	(Monaco) Daniel Elena	(France) Citroën Total WRT	Citroën Xsara WRC	4:45:55.8	+2:07.9	8
3	4	(Spain) Carlos Sainz	(Spain) Marc Martí	(France) Citroën Total WRT	Citroën Xsara WRC	4:47:08.8	+3:20.9	6
4	19	(Italy) Andrea Navarra	(Italy) Simona Fedeli	(Italy) Andrea Navarra	Subaru Impreza S9 WRC '03	4:54:04.0	+10:16.1	5
5	8	(Belgium) François Duval	(Belgium) Stéphane Prévot	(United Kingdom) Ford Motor Co. Ltd.	Ford Focus RS WRC '04	4:54:35.9	+10:48.0	4
6	70	(Italy) Gianluigi Galli	(Italy) Guido D'Amore	(Italy) Gianluigi Galli	Mitsubishi Lancer Evo VIII	5:08:59.5	+25:11.6	3
7	5	(Finland) Marcus Grönholm	(Finland) Timo Rautiainen	(France) Marlboro Peugeot Total	Peugeot 307 WRC	5:10:27.1	+26:39.2	2
8	16	(Germany) Antony Warmbold	(United Kingdom) Gemma Price	(Germany) Antony Warmbold	Ford Focus RS WRC '02	5:11:51.1	+28:03.2	1

=== World Rally Cars ===
==== Classification ====
Position		No.	Driver	Co-driver	Entrant	Car	Time	Difference	Points
Event	Class	No.	Driver	Co-driver	Entrant	Car	Time	Difference	Points
1	1	1	(Norway) Petter Solberg	(United Kingdom) Phil Mills	(Japan) 555 Subaru World Rally Team	Subaru Impreza S10 WRC '04	4:43:47.9		10
2	2	3	(France) Sébastien Loeb	(Monaco) Daniel Elena	(France) Citroën Total WRT	Citroën Xsara WRC	4:45:55.8	+2:07.9	8
3	3	4	(Spain) Carlos Sainz	(Spain) Marc Martí	(France) Citroën Total WRT	Citroën Xsara WRC	4:47:08.8	+3:20.9	6
5	4	8	(Belgium) François Duval	(Belgium) Stéphane Prévot	(United Kingdom) Ford Motor Co. Ltd.	Ford Focus RS WRC '04	4:54:35.9	+10:48.0	4
7	5	5	(Finland) Marcus Grönholm	(Finland) Timo Rautiainen	(France) Marlboro Peugeot Total	Peugeot 307 WRC	5:10:27.1	+26:39.2	2
Retired SS17		7	(Estonia) Markko Märtin	(United Kingdom) Michael Park	(United Kingdom) Ford Motor Co. Ltd.	Ford Focus RS WRC '04	Turbo		0
Retired SS9		6	(Finland) Harri Rovanperä	(Finland) Risto Pietiläinen	(France) Marlboro Peugeot Total	Peugeot 307 WRC	Electrical		0
Retired SS4		2	(Finland) Mikko Hirvonen	(Finland) Jarmo Lehtinen	(Japan) 555 Subaru World Rally Team	Subaru Impreza S10 WRC '04	Gearbox		0

==== Special stages ====
Day	Stage	Stage name	Length	Winner	Car	Time	Class leaders
Leg 1 (1 Oct)	SS1	Tantariles 1	28.69 km	(Norway) Petter Solberg	Subaru Impreza S10 WRC '04	21:05.6	(Norway) Petter Solberg
Leg 1 (1 Oct)	SS2	Loelle 1	27.45 km	(Norway) Petter Solberg	Subaru Impreza S10 WRC '04	19:57.4	(Norway) Petter Solberg
Leg 1 (1 Oct)	SS3	Tepilora 1	23.14 km	(France) Sébastien Loeb	Citroën Xsara WRC	19:42.9	(Norway) Petter Solberg
Leg 1 (1 Oct)	SS4	Tantariles 2	28.69 km	(Finland) Marcus Grönholm	Peugeot 307 WRC	20:40.2	(Norway) Petter Solberg
Leg 1 (1 Oct)	SS5	Loelle 2	27.45 km	(Finland) Marcus Grönholm	Peugeot 307 WRC	19:21.4	(Norway) Petter Solberg
Leg 1 (1 Oct)	SS6	Tepilora 2	23.14 km	(Norway) Petter Solberg	Subaru Impreza S10 WRC '04	19:03.0	(Norway) Petter Solberg
Leg 2 (2 Oct)	SS7	Sas Molas 1	28.62 km	(Norway) Petter Solberg	Subaru Impreza S10 WRC '04	19:17.3	(Norway) Petter Solberg
Leg 2 (2 Oct)	SS8	Le Sughere 1	9.06 km	(Norway) Petter Solberg	Subaru Impreza S10 WRC '04	6:28.9	(Norway) Petter Solberg
Leg 2 (2 Oct)	SS9	Tandalò 1	34.21 km	(Norway) Petter Solberg	Subaru Impreza S10 WRC '04	25:26.0	(Norway) Petter Solberg
Leg 2 (2 Oct)	SS10	Lovia Avra	4.21 km	(Norway) Petter Solberg	Subaru Impreza S10 WRC '04	3:09.3	(Norway) Petter Solberg
Leg 2 (2 Oct)	SS11	Sas Molas 2	28.62 km	(Finland) Marcus Grönholm	Peugeot 307 WRC	19:04.3	(Norway) Petter Solberg
Leg 2 (2 Oct)	SS12	Le Sughere 2	9.06 km	(Norway) Petter Solberg	Subaru Impreza S10 WRC '04	6:21.2	(Norway) Petter Solberg
Leg 2 (2 Oct)	SS13	Tandalò 2	34.21 km	(Norway) Petter Solberg	Subaru Impreza S10 WRC '04	24:54.5	(Norway) Petter Solberg
Leg 3 (3 Oct)	SS14	Limbara 1	18.10 km	(Norway) Petter Solberg	Subaru Impreza S10 WRC '04	13:18.8	(Norway) Petter Solberg
Leg 3 (3 Oct)	SS15	Terramala 1	11.59 km	(France) Sébastien Loeb	Citroën Xsara WRC	8:42.6	(Norway) Petter Solberg
Leg 3 (3 Oct)	SS16	Monti di Deu 1	8.65 km	(Norway) Petter Solberg	Subaru Impreza S10 WRC '04	7:53.4	(Norway) Petter Solberg
Leg 3 (3 Oct)	SS17	Limbara 2	18.10 km	(Norway) Petter Solberg	Subaru Impreza S10 WRC '04	13:01.7	(Norway) Petter Solberg
Leg 3 (3 Oct)	SS18	Terramala 2	11.59 km	(Finland) Marcus Grönholm	Peugeot 307 WRC	8:24.4	(Norway) Petter Solberg
Leg 3 (3 Oct)	SS19	Monti di Deu 2	8.65 km	(Norway) Petter Solberg	Subaru Impreza S10 WRC '04	7:38.1	(Norway) Petter Solberg

==== Championship standings ====
Pos.	Drivers' championships			Co-drivers' championships			Manufacturers' championships		
Pos.	Move	Driver	Points	Move	Co-driver	Points	Move	Manufacturer	Points
1		(France) Sébastien Loeb	100		(Monaco) Daniel Elena	100		(France) Citroën Total WRT	164
2		(Norway) Petter Solberg	74		(United Kingdom) Phil Mills	74		(United Kingdom) Ford Motor Co. Ltd.	117
3	1	(Spain) Carlos Sainz	61	1	(Spain) Marc Martí	61		(Japan) 555 Subaru World Rally Team	101
4	1	(Estonia) Markko Märtin	59	1	(United Kingdom) Michael Park	59		(France) Marlboro Peugeot Total	80
5		(Finland) Marcus Grönholm	49		(Finland) Timo Rautiainen	49		(Japan) Mitsubishi Motors	17

=== Junior World Rally Championship ===
==== Classification ====
Position		No.	Driver	Co-driver	Entrant	Car	Time	Difference	Points
Event	Class	No.	Driver	Co-driver	Entrant	Car	Time	Difference	Points
9	1	45	(Sweden) Per-Gunnar Andersson	(Sweden) Jonas Andersson	(Japan) Suzuki Sport	Suzuki Ignis S1600	5:12:51.5		10
11	2	33	(United Kingdom) Guy Wilks	(United Kingdom) Phil Pugh	(Japan) Suzuki Sport	Suzuki Ignis S1600	5:15:05.7	+2:14.2	8
12	3	31	(San Marino) Mirco Baldacci	(Italy) Giovanni Bernacchini	(Japan) Suzuki Sport	Suzuki Ignis S1600	5:15:41.7	+2:50.2	6
13	4	35	(Finland) Kosti Katajamäki	(Finland) Timo Alanne	(Japan) Suzuki Sport	Suzuki Ignis S1600	5:16:31.1	+3:39.6	5
14	5	51	(Belgium) Larry Cols	(Belgium) Filip Goddé	(France) Renault Sport	Renault Clio S1600	5:17:12.2	+4:20.7	4
15	6	39	(France) Nicolas Bernardi	(Belgium) Jean-Marc Fortin	(France) Renault Sport	Renault Clio S1600	5:18:47.7	+5:56.2	3
16	7	36	(United Kingdom) Kris Meeke	(United Kingdom) David Senior	(United Kingdom) McRae Motorsport	Opel Corsa S1600	5:26:22.3	+13:30.8	2
18	8	34	(San Marino) Alessandro Broccoli	(Italy) Giovanni Agnese	(San Marino) Sab Motorsport	Fiat Punto S1600	5:32:03.9	+19:12.4	1
23	9	41	(United Kingdom) Natalie Barratt	(United Kingdom) Carl Williamson	(United Kingdom) Risbridger Motorsport	Renault Clio S1600	5:47:03.4	+34:11.9	0
25	10	44	(Italy) Alan Scorcioni	(Italy) Fulvio Florean	(Italy) H.F. Grifone SRL	Fiat Punto S1600	5:58:43.4	+45:51.9	0
Retired SS17		46	(Spain) Xavier Pons	(Spain) Oriol Julià Pascual	(Spain) RACC Motor Sport	Fiat Punto S1600	Engine		0
Retired SS16		50	(United Kingdom) Oliver Marshall	(United Kingdom) Craig Parry	(United Kingdom) Prospeed Motorsport	Renault Clio S1600	Suspension		0
Retired SS15		32	(Estonia) Urmo Aava	(Estonia) Kuldar Sikk	(Japan) Suzuki Sport	Suzuki Ignis S1600	Accident		0
Retired SS8		48	(Zimbabwe) Conrad Rautenbach	(United Kingdom) Mark Jones	(United Kingdom) Birkbeck Rallysport	Suzuki Ignis S1600	Gearbox mounting		0
Retired SS7		37	(Italy) Luca Cecchettini	(Italy) Nicola Arena	(Italy) Autorel Sport	Renault Clio S1600	Driver ill		0
Retired SS7		42	(France) Mathieu Biasion	(France) Eric Domenech	(Italy) Power Car Team	Renault Clio S1600	Engine		0
Retired SS6		40	(France) Guerlain Chicherit	(France) Mathieu Baumel	(France) Citroën Total	Citroën Saxo S1600	Gearbox mounting		0
Retired SS4		49	(Italy) Luca Betti	(Italy) Michele Rosso	(Italy) Meteco Corse	Fiat Punto S1600	Accident		0
Retired SS2		43	(Finland) Jari-Matti Latvala	(Finland) Miikka Anttila	(Japan) Suzuki Sport	Suzuki Ignis S1600	Suspension		0
Retired SS2		47	(Italy) Luca Tabaton	(Italy) Gisella Rovegno	(Italy) H.F. Grifone SRL	Fiat Punto S1600	Driveshaft		0

==== Special stages ====
Day	Stage	Stage name	Length	Winner	Car	Time	Class leaders
Leg 1 (1 Oct)	SS1	Tantariles 1	28.69 km	(San Marino) Mirco Baldacci	Suzuki Ignis S1600	23:11.5	(San Marino) Mirco Baldacci
Leg 1 (1 Oct)	SS2	Loelle 1	27.45 km	(San Marino) Mirco Baldacci	Suzuki Ignis S1600	21:34.4	(San Marino) Mirco Baldacci
Leg 1 (1 Oct)	SS3	Tepilora 1	23.14 km	(Estonia) Urmo Aava	Suzuki Ignis S1600	20:57.6	(San Marino) Mirco Baldacci
Leg 1 (1 Oct)	SS4	Tantariles 2	28.69 km	(Italy) Alan Scorcioni	Fiat Punto S1600	22:55.9	(San Marino) Mirco Baldacci
Leg 1 (1 Oct)	SS5	Loelle 2	27.45 km	(France) Nicolas Bernardi	Renault Clio S1600	21:29.1	(Estonia) Urmo Aava
Leg 1 (1 Oct)	SS6	Tepilora 2	23.14 km	(France) Nicolas Bernardi	Renault Clio S1600	20:48.7	(Estonia) Urmo Aava
Leg 2 (2 Oct)	SS7	Sas Molas 1	28.62 km	(Finland) Kosti Katajamäki	Suzuki Ignis S1600	21:29.9	(Sweden) Per-Gunnar Andersson
Leg 2 (2 Oct)	SS8	Le Sughere 1	9.06 km	(United Kingdom) Guy Wilks	Suzuki Ignis S1600	7:08.4	(Sweden) Per-Gunnar Andersson
Leg 2 (2 Oct)	SS9	Tandalò 1	34.21 km	(Finland) Kosti Katajamäki	Suzuki Ignis S1600	27:40.9	(Sweden) Per-Gunnar Andersson
Leg 2 (2 Oct)	SS10	Lovia Avra	4.21 km	(Belgium) Larry Cols	Renault Clio S1600	3:23.6	(Sweden) Per-Gunnar Andersson
Leg 2 (2 Oct)	SS11	Sas Molas 2	28.62 km	(San Marino) Mirco Baldacci	Suzuki Ignis S1600	20:57.9	(Sweden) Per-Gunnar Andersson
Leg 2 (2 Oct)	SS12	Le Sughere 2	9.06 km	(Finland) Kosti Katajamäki	Suzuki Ignis S1600	6:58.0	(Sweden) Per-Gunnar Andersson
Leg 2 (2 Oct)	SS13	Tandalò 2	34.21 km	(Sweden) Per-Gunnar Andersson	Suzuki Ignis S1600	27:18.5	(Sweden) Per-Gunnar Andersson
Leg 3 (3 Oct)	SS14	Limbara 1	18.10 km	(France) Nicolas Bernardi	Renault Clio S1600	14:44.9	(Sweden) Per-Gunnar Andersson
Leg 3 (3 Oct)	SS15	Terramala 1	11.59 km	(San Marino) Mirco Baldacci	Suzuki Ignis S1600	9:33.6	(Sweden) Per-Gunnar Andersson
Leg 3 (3 Oct)	SS16	Monti di Deu 1	8.65 km	(San Marino) Mirco Baldacci	Suzuki Ignis S1600	8:22.6	(Sweden) Per-Gunnar Andersson
Leg 3 (3 Oct)	SS17	Limbara 2	18.10 km	(Sweden) Per-Gunnar Andersson	Suzuki Ignis S1600	14:36.8	(Sweden) Per-Gunnar Andersson
Leg 3 (3 Oct)	SS18	Terramala 2	11.59 km	(Finland) Kosti Katajamäki (Sweden) Per-Gunnar Andersson	Suzuki Ignis S1600; Suzuki Ignis S1600	9:29.0	(Sweden) Per-Gunnar Andersson
Leg 3 (3 Oct)	SS19	Monti di Deu 2	8.65 km	(France) Nicolas Bernardi	Renault Clio S1600	8:14.5	(Sweden) Per-Gunnar Andersson

==== Championship standings ====
Pos.	Drivers' championships		
Pos.	Move	Driver	Points
1		(United Kingdom) Guy Wilks	34
2	2	(Sweden) Per-Gunnar Andersson	31
3	1	(France) Nicolas Bernardi	27
4	1	(Finland) Kosti Katajamäki	27
5	4	(San Marino) Mirco Baldacci	17
