= 2004 Acropolis Rally =

6th round of the 2004 World Rally

2004 Acropolis Rally 51st Acropolis Rally of Greece
Round 6 of the 2004 World Rally Championship season
| ← Previous event | Next event → |
- Host country: Greece
- Rally base: Lamia
- Dates run: 3 June 2004 – 6 June 2004
- Stages: 22 (377.13 km; 234.34 miles)
- Stage surface: Gravel
- Overall distance: 1,438.48 km (893.83 miles)

Statistics
- Crews: 72 at start, 33 at finish

Overall results
- Overall winner: (Norway) Petter Solberg (United Kingdom) Phil Mills (Japan) 555 Subaru World Rally Team; 4:39:06.2

The 2004 Acropolis Rally (formally the 51st Acropolis Rally of Greece) was the sixth round of the 2004 World Rally Championship. The race was held over four days between 3 and 6 June 2004, and was won by Subaru's Petter Solberg, his 7th win in the World Rally Championship.

== Background ==
=== Entry list ===
| No. | Driver | Co-Driver | Entrant | Car | Tyre |
|---|---|---|---|---|---|
World Rally Championship manufacturer entries
| 1 | (Norway) Petter Solberg | (United Kingdom) Phil Mills | (Japan) 555 Subaru World Rally Team | Subaru Impreza S10 WRC '04 | P |
| 2 | (Finland) Mikko Hirvonen | (Finland) Jarmo Lehtinen | (Japan) 555 Subaru World Rally Team | Subaru Impreza S10 WRC '04 | P |
| 3 | (France) Sébastien Loeb | (Monaco) Daniel Elena | (France) Citroën Total WRT | Citroën Xsara WRC | MI |
| 4 | (Spain) Carlos Sainz | (Spain) Marc Martí | (France) Citroën Total WRT | Citroën Xsara WRC | MI |
| 5 | (Finland) Marcus Grönholm | (Finland) Timo Rautiainen | (France) Marlboro Peugeot Total | Peugeot 307 WRC | MI |
| 6 | (Finland) Harri Rovanperä | (Finland) Risto Pietiläinen | (France) Marlboro Peugeot Total | Peugeot 307 WRC | MI |
| 7 | (Estonia) Markko Märtin | (United Kingdom) Michael Park | (United Kingdom) Ford Motor Co. Ltd. | Ford Focus RS WRC '04 | MI |
| 8 | (Belgium) François Duval | (Belgium) Stéphane Prévot | (United Kingdom) Ford Motor Co. Ltd. | Ford Focus RS WRC '04 | MI |
| 9 | (France) Gilles Panizzi | (France) Hervé Panizzi | (Japan) Mitsubishi Motors | Mitsubishi Lancer WRC 04 | MI |
| 10 | (Spain) Daniel Solà | (Spain) Xavier Amigò | (Japan) Mitsubishi Motors | Mitsubishi Lancer WRC 04 | MI |
World Rally Championship entries
| 11 | (Germany) Armin Schwarz | (Germany) Manfred Hiemer | (Czech Republic) Škoda Motorsport | Škoda Fabia WRC | MI |
| 12 | (Finland) Toni Gardemeister | (Finland) Paavo Lukander | (Czech Republic) Škoda Motorsport | Škoda Fabia WRC | MI |
| 14 | (Finland) Janne Tuohino | (Finland) Jukka Aho | (Finland) Janne Tuohino | Ford Focus RS WRC '02 | MI |
| 15 | (Finland) Jussi Välimäki | (Finland) Jakke Honkanen | (Finland) Jussi Välimäki | Hyundai Accent WRC3 | MI |
| 16 | (Sweden) Daniel Carlsson | (Sweden) Matthias Andersson | (France) Bozian Racing | Peugeot 206 WRC | MI |
| 17 | (France) Nicolas Vouilloz | (France) Denis Giraudet | (France) Bozian Racing | Peugeot 206 WRC | MI |
| 18 | (Austria) Manfred Stohl | (Austria) Ilka Minor | (Austria) Manfred Stohl | Peugeot 206 WRC | P |
| 19 | (Germany) Antony Warmbold | (United Kingdom) Gemma Price | (Germany) Antony Warmbold | Ford Focus RS WRC '02 | MI |
| 20 | (Slovakia) Jozef Béreš Jr. | (Czech Republic) Petr Starý | (Slovakia) Jozef Béreš Jr. | Hyundai Accent WRC3 | MI |
| 21 | (Czech Republic) Roman Kresta | (Czech Republic) Jan Tománek | (Czech Republic) Roman Kresta | Ford Focus RS WRC '02 | MI |
| 22 | (United Kingdom) Alistair Ginley | (Republic of Ireland) Rory Kennedy | (United Kingdom) Alistair Ginley | Subaru Impreza S9 WRC '03 | P |
| 23 | (Greece) Armodios Vovos | (Greece) Loris Meletopoulos | (Greece) Armodios Vovos | Ford Focus RS WRC '03 | MI |
| 25 | (Greece) Ioannis Papadimitriou | (United Kingdom) Allan Harryman | (Greece) Ioannis Papadimitriou | Ford Focus RS WRC '03 | MI |
| 65 | (Greece) Konstantinos Apostolou | (Greece) Dionissis Bellas | (Greece) Konstantinos Apostolou | Mitsubishi Lancer Evo VI | MI |
JWRC entries
| 31 | (San Marino) Mirco Baldacci | (Italy) Giovanni Bernacchini | (Japan) Suzuki Sport | Suzuki Ignis S1600 | P |
| 32 | (Estonia) Urmo Aava | (Estonia) Kuldar Sikk | (Japan) Suzuki Sport | Suzuki Ignis S1600 | P |
| 33 | (United Kingdom) Guy Wilks | (United Kingdom) Phil Pugh | (Japan) Suzuki Sport | Suzuki Ignis S1600 | P |
| 34 | (San Marino) Alessandro Broccoli | (Italy) Giovanni Agnese | (San Marino) Sab Motorsport | Fiat Punto S1600 | P |
| 35 | (Finland) Kosti Katajamäki | (Finland) Timo Alanne | (Japan) Suzuki Sport | Suzuki Ignis S1600 | P |
| 36 | (United Kingdom) Kris Meeke | (United Kingdom) Chris Patterson | (United Kingdom) McRae Motorsport | Opel Corsa S1600 | P |
| 37 | (Italy) Luca Cecchettini | (Italy) Nicola Arena | (Italy) Autorel Sport | Renault Clio S1600 | P |
| 39 | (France) Nicolas Bernardi | (Belgium) Jean-Marc Fortin | (France) Renault Sport | Renault Clio S1600 | P |
| 40 | (France) Guerlain Chicherit | (France) Mathieu Baumel | (France) Citroën Total | Citroën Saxo S1600 | P |
| 41 | (United Kingdom) Natalie Barratt | (United Kingdom) Carl Williamson | (United Kingdom) Risbridger Motorsport | Renault Clio S1600 | P |
| 42 | (France) Mathieu Biasion | (France) Eric Domenech | (Italy) H.F. Grifone SRL | Fiat Punto S1600 | P |
| 43 | (Finland) Jari-Matti Latvala | (Finland) Miikka Anttila | (Italy) Astra Racing | Ford Fiesta S1600 | P |
| 44 | (Italy) Alan Scorcioni | (Italy) Massimo Daddoveri | (Italy) H.F. Grifone SRL | Fiat Punto S1600 | P |
| 45 | (Sweden) Per-Gunnar Andersson | (Sweden) Jonas Andersson | (Japan) Suzuki Sport | Suzuki Ignis S1600 | P |
| 46 | (Spain) Xavier Pons | (Spain) Oriol Julià Pascual | (Spain) RACC Motor Sport | Fiat Punto S1600 | P |
| 47 | (Italy) Luca Tabaton | (Italy) Gisella Rovegno | (Italy) H.F. Grifone SRL | Fiat Punto S1600 | P |
| 48 | (Zimbabwe) Conrad Rautenbach | (Zimbabwe) Timothy Sturla | (United Kingdom) Birkbeck Rallysport | Opel Corsa S1600 | P |
| 49 | (Italy) Luca Betti | (Italy) Paolo Del Grande | (Italy) Meteco Corse | Peugeot 206 S1600 | P |
| 50 | (United Kingdom) Oliver Marshall | (United Kingdom) Craig Parry | (United Kingdom) Prospeed Motorsport | Renault Clio S1600 | P |
| 51 | (Belgium) Larry Cols | (Belgium) Filip Goddé | (France) Renault Sport | Renault Clio S1600 | P |

=== Itinerary ===
All dates and times are EEST (UTC+3).

| Date | Time | No. | Stage name | Distance |
|---|---|---|---|---|
Leg 1 — 145.45 km
| 3 June | 19:00 | SS1 | Lilea — Parnassos 1 | 2.25 km |
| 4 June | 07:53 | SS2 | Rengini 1 | 11.84 km |
| 4 June | 08:21 | SS3 | Elatia — Zeli 1 | 7.57 km |
| 4 June | 11:35 | SS4 | Pavliani 1 | 24.45 km |
| 4 June | 12:24 | SS5 | Stromi 1 | 14.61 km |
| 4 June | 13:27 | SS6 | Eleftherohori | 18.44 km |
| 4 June | 16:18 | SS7 | Pavliani 2 | 24.45 km |
| 4 June | 17:07 | SS8 | Stromi 2 | 14.61 km |
| 4 June | 18:27 | SS9 | Lilea — Parnassos 2 | 2.25 km |
Leg 2 — 133.18 km
| 5 June | 08:46 | SS10 | Amfissa 1 | 14.59 km |
| 5 June | 09:35 | SS11 | Drosohori 1 | 28.68 km |
| 5 June | 11:22 | SS12 | Rengini 2 | 11.84 km |
| 5 June | 11:50 | SS13 | Elatia — Zeli 2 | 7.57 km |
| 5 June | 15:24 | SS14 | Amfissa 2 | 14.59 km |
| 5 June | 16:13 | SS15 | Drosohori 2 | 28.68 km |
| 5 June | 17:11 | SS16 | Lilea — Parnassos 3 | 2.25 km |
Leg 3 — 98.50 km
| 6 June | 08:01 | SS17 | Dikastro 1 | 26.78 km |
| 6 June | 09:00 | SS18 | Agios Stefanos 1 | 13.47 km |
| 6 June | 09:38 | SS19 | Styrfaka 1 | 9.00 km |
| 6 June | 12:14 | SS20 | Dikastro 2 | 26.78 km |
| 6 June | 13:13 | SS21 | Agios Stefanos 2 | 13.47 km |
| 6 June | 13:51 | SS22 | Styrfaka 2 | 9.00 km |

== Results ==
=== Overall ===
| Pos. | No. | Driver | Co-driver | Team | Car | Time | Difference | Points |
|---|---|---|---|---|---|---|---|---|
| 1 | 1 | (Norway) Petter Solberg | (United Kingdom) Phil Mills | (Japan) 555 Subaru World Rally Team | Subaru Impreza S10 WRC '04 | 4:39:06.2 | | 10 |
| 2 | 3 | (France) Sébastien Loeb | (Monaco) Daniel Elena | (France) Citroën Total WRT | Citroën Xsara WRC | 4:39:24.6 | +18.4 | 8 |
| 3 | 6 | (Finland) Harri Rovanperä | (Finland) Risto Pietiläinen | (France) Marlboro Peugeot Total | Peugeot 307 WRC | 4:39:34.5 | +28.3 | 6 |
| 4 | 8 | (Belgium) François Duval | (Belgium) Stéphane Prévot | (United Kingdom) Ford Motor Co. Ltd. | Ford Focus RS WRC '04 | 4:41:25.6 | +2:19.4 | 5 |
| 5 | 16 | (Sweden) Daniel Carlsson | (Sweden) Matthias Andersson | (France) Bozian Racing | Peugeot 206 WRC | 4:45:56.3 | +6:50.1 | 4 |
| 6 | 18 | (Austria) Manfred Stohl | (Austria) Ilka Minor | (Austria) Manfred Stohl | Peugeot 206 WRC | 4:49:07.8 | +10:01.6 | 3 |
| 7 | 14 | (Finland) Janne Tuohino | (Finland) Jukka Aho | (Finland) Janne Tuohino | Ford Focus RS WRC '02 | 4:50:18.7 | +11:12.5 | 2 |
| 8 | 23 | (Greece) Armodios Vovos | (Greece) Loris Meletopoulos | (Greece) Armodios Vovos | Ford Focus RS WRC '03 | 4:53:13.2 | +14:07.0 | 1 |

=== World Rally Cars ===
==== Classification ====
| Position | | No. | Driver | Co-driver | Entrant | Car | Time | Difference | Points |
| Event | Class | No. | Driver | Co-driver | Entrant | Car | Time | Difference | Points |
|---|---|---|---|---|---|---|---|---|---|
| 1 | 1 | 1 | (Norway) Petter Solberg | (United Kingdom) Phil Mills | (Japan) 555 Subaru World Rally Team | Subaru Impreza S10 WRC '04 | 4:39:06.2 | | 10 |
| 2 | 2 | 3 | (France) Sébastien Loeb | (Monaco) Daniel Elena | (France) Citroën Total WRT | Citroën Xsara WRC | 4:39:24.6 | +18.4 | 8 |
| 3 | 3 | 6 | (Finland) Harri Rovanperä | (Finland) Risto Pietiläinen | (France) Marlboro Peugeot Total | Peugeot 307 WRC | 4:39:34.5 | +28.3 | 6 |
| 4 | 4 | 8 | (Belgium) François Duval | (Belgium) Stéphane Prévot | (United Kingdom) Ford Motor Co. Ltd. | Ford Focus RS WRC '04 | 4:41:25.6 | +2:19.4 | 5 |
| 10 | 5 | 9 | (France) Gilles Panizzi | (France) Hervé Panizzi | (Japan) Mitsubishi Motors | Mitsubishi Lancer WRC 04 | 4:58:27.6 | +19:21.4 | 0 |
| 19 | 6 | 4 | (Spain) Carlos Sainz | (Spain) Marc Martí | (France) Citroën Total WRT | Citroën Xsara WRC | 5:21:51.6 | +42:45.4 | 0 |
| Retired SS17 | | 2 | (Finland) Mikko Hirvonen | (Finland) Jarmo Lehtinen | (Japan) 555 Subaru World Rally Team | Subaru Impreza S10 WRC '04 | Rollcage damaged | | 0 |
| Retired SS11 | | 5 | (Finland) Marcus Grönholm | (Finland) Timo Rautiainen | (France) Marlboro Peugeot Total | Peugeot 307 WRC | Suspension | | 0 |
| Retired SS3 | | 7 | (Estonia) Markko Märtin | (United Kingdom) Michael Park | (United Kingdom) Ford Motor Co. Ltd. | Ford Focus RS WRC '04 | Accident | | 0 |
| Retired SS3 | | 10 | (Spain) Daniel Solà | (Spain) Xavier Amigò | (Japan) Mitsubishi Motors | Mitsubishi Lancer WRC 04 | Accident | | 0 |

==== Special stages ====
| Day | Stage | Stage name | Length | Winner | Car | Time | Class leaders |
|---|---|---|---|---|---|---|---|
| Leg 1 (3 Jun) | SS1 | Lilea — Parnassos 1 | 2.25 km | (Finland) Marcus Grönholm | Peugeot 307 WRC | 1:53.1 | (Finland) Marcus Grönholm |
| Leg 1 (4 Jun) | SS2 | Rengini 1 | 11.84 km | (Finland) Harri Rovanperä | Peugeot 307 WRC | 8:39.7 | (Finland) Marcus Grönholm |
| Leg 1 (4 Jun) | SS3 | Elatia — Zeli 1 | 7.57 km | (Finland) Marcus Grönholm | Peugeot 307 WRC | 21:59.6 | (Finland) Marcus Grönholm |
| Leg 1 (4 Jun) | SS4 | Pavliani 1 | 24.45 km | (Norway) Petter Solberg | Subaru Impreza S10 WRC '04 | 19:38.4 | (Norway) Petter Solberg |
| Leg 1 (4 Jun) | SS5 | Stromi 1 | 14.61 km | (Norway) Petter Solberg | Subaru Impreza S10 WRC '04 | 11:36.4 | (Norway) Petter Solberg |
| Leg 1 (4 Jun) | SS6 | Eleftherohori | 18.44 km | (Norway) Petter Solberg | Subaru Impreza S10 WRC '04 | 11:24.4 | (Norway) Petter Solberg |
| Leg 1 (4 Jun) | SS7 | Pavliani 2 | 24.45 km | (Norway) Petter Solberg | Subaru Impreza S10 WRC '04 | 20:31.9 | (Norway) Petter Solberg |
| Leg 1 (4 Jun) | SS8 | Stromi 2 | 14.61 km | (Norway) Petter Solberg | Subaru Impreza S10 WRC '04 | 11:32.0 | (Norway) Petter Solberg |
| Leg 1 (4 Jun) | SS9 | Lilea — Parnassos 2 | 2.25 km | (Belgium) François Duval | Ford Focus RS WRC '04 | 1:54.9 | (Norway) Petter Solberg |
| Leg 2 (5 Jun) | SS10 | Amfissa 1 | 14.59 km | (France) Sébastien Loeb | Citroën Xsara WRC | 9:11.8 | (Norway) Petter Solberg |
| Leg 2 (5 Jun) | SS11 | Drosohori 1 | 28.68 km | (Norway) Petter Solberg | Subaru Impreza S10 WRC '04 | 22:40.7 | (Norway) Petter Solberg |
| Leg 2 (5 Jun) | SS12 | Rengini 2 | 11.84 km | (Finland) Harri Rovanperä | Peugeot 307 WRC | 8:20.5 | (Norway) Petter Solberg |
| Leg 2 (5 Jun) | SS13 | Elatia — Zeli 2 | 7.57 km | (France) Sébastien Loeb | Citroën Xsara WRC | 21:27.9 | (Norway) Petter Solberg |
| Leg 2 (5 Jun) | SS14 | Amfissa 2 | 14.59 km | (Finland) Harri Rovanperä | Peugeot 307 WRC | 9:07.2 | (Norway) Petter Solberg |
| Leg 2 (5 Jun) | SS15 | Drosohori 2 | 28.68 km | (Norway) Petter Solberg | Subaru Impreza S10 WRC '04 | 22:33.1 | (Norway) Petter Solberg |
| Leg 2 (5 Jun) | SS16 | Lilea — Parnassos 3 | 2.25 km | (Norway) Petter Solberg | Subaru Impreza S10 WRC '04 | 1:53.6 | (Norway) Petter Solberg |
| Leg 3 (6 Jun) | SS17 | Dikastro 1 | 26.78 km | (France) Sébastien Loeb | Citroën Xsara WRC | 20:26.8 | (Norway) Petter Solberg |
| Leg 3 (6 Jun) | SS18 | Agios Stefanos 1 | 13.47 km | (Norway) Petter Solberg | Subaru Impreza S10 WRC '04 | 9:46.4 | (Norway) Petter Solberg |
| Leg 3 (6 Jun) | SS19 | Styrfaka 1 | 9.00 km | (France) Sébastien Loeb | Citroën Xsara WRC | 6:24.3 | (Norway) Petter Solberg |
| Leg 3 (6 Jun) | SS20 | Dikastro 2 | 26.78 km | (France) Sébastien Loeb | Citroën Xsara WRC | 20:21.6 | (Norway) Petter Solberg |
| Leg 3 (6 Jun) | SS21 | Agios Stefanos 2 | 13.47 km | (Finland) Harri Rovanperä | Peugeot 307 WRC | 9:38.9 | (Norway) Petter Solberg |
| Leg 3 (6 Jun) | SS22 | Styrfaka 2 | 9.00 km | (France) Sébastien Loeb | Citroën Xsara WRC | 6:16.3 | (Norway) Petter Solberg |

==== Championship standings ====
| Pos. | Drivers' championships | | | Co-drivers' championships | | | Manufacturers' championships | | |
| Pos. | Move | Driver | Points | Move | Co-driver | Points | Move | Manufacturer | Points |
|---|---|---|---|---|---|---|---|---|---|
| 1 | | (France) Sébastien Loeb | 43 | | (Monaco) Daniel Elena | 43 | 1 | (France) Citroën Total WRT | 65 |
| 2 | 1 | (Norway) Petter Solberg | 38 | 1 | (United Kingdom) Phil Mills | 38 | 1 | (United Kingdom) Ford Motor Co. Ltd. | 60 |
| 3 | 1 | (Estonia) Markko Märtin | 34 | 1 | (United Kingdom) Michael Park | 34 | | (Japan) 555 Subaru World Rally Team | 50 |
| 4 | | (Finland) Marcus Grönholm | 24 | | (Finland) Timo Rautiainen | 24 | | (France) Marlboro Peugeot Total | 39 |
| 5 | 1 | (Belgium) François Duval | 19 | 1 | (Belgium) Stéphane Prévot | 19 | | (Japan) Mitsubishi Motors | 9 |

=== Junior World Rally Championship ===
==== Classification ====
| Position | | No. | Driver | Co-driver | Entrant | Car | Time | Difference | Points |
| Event | Class | No. | Driver | Co-driver | Entrant | Car | Time | Difference | Points |
|---|---|---|---|---|---|---|---|---|---|
| 12 | 1 | 33 | (United Kingdom) Guy Wilks | (United Kingdom) Phil Pugh | (Japan) Suzuki Sport | Suzuki Ignis S1600 | 5:14:13.1 | | 10 |
| 15 | 2 | 39 | (France) Nicolas Bernardi | (Belgium) Jean-Marc Fortin | (France) Renault Sport | Renault Clio S1600 | 5:19:25.0 | +5:11.9 | 8 |
| 16 | 3 | 46 | (Spain) Xavier Pons | (Spain) Oriol Julià Pascual | (Spain) RACC Motor Sport | Fiat Punto S1600 | 5:20:57.1 | +6:44.0 | 6 |
| 21 | 4 | 51 | (Belgium) Larry Cols | (Belgium) Filip Goddé | (France) Renault Sport | Renault Clio S1600 | 5:24:14.8 | +10:01.7 | 5 |
| 24 | 5 | 50 | (United Kingdom) Oliver Marshall | (United Kingdom) Craig Parry | (United Kingdom) Prospeed Motorsport | Renault Clio S1600 | 5:33:23.9 | +19:10.8 | 4 |
| Retired SS20 | | 42 | (France) Mathieu Biasion | (France) Eric Domenech | (Italy) H.F. Grifone SRL | Fiat Punto S1600 | Engine | | 0 |
| Retired SS17 | | 37 | (Italy) Luca Cecchettini | (Italy) Nicola Arena | (Italy) Autorel Sport | Renault Clio S1600 | Rolled | | 0 |
| Retired SS15 | | 31 | (San Marino) Mirco Baldacci | (Italy) Giovanni Bernacchini | (Japan) Suzuki Sport | Suzuki Ignis S1600 | Electrical | | 0 |
| Retired SS13 | | 35 | (Finland) Kosti Katajamäki | (Finland) Timo Alanne | (Japan) Suzuki Sport | Suzuki Ignis S1600 | Lost wheel | | 0 |
| Retired SS12 | | 40 | (France) Guerlain Chicherit | (France) Mathieu Baumel | (France) Citroën Total | Citroën Saxo S1600 | Engine | | 0 |
| Retired SS12 | | 43 | (Finland) Jari-Matti Latvala | (Finland) Miikka Anttila | (Italy) Astra Racing | Ford Fiesta S1600 | Clutch | | 0 |
| Retired SS12 | | 44 | (Italy) Alan Scorcioni | (Italy) Massimo Daddoveri | (Italy) H.F. Grifone SRL | Fiat Punto S1600 | Gearbox | | 0 |
| Retired SS11 | | 34 | (San Marino) Alessandro Broccoli | (Italy) Giovanni Agnese | (San Marino) Sab Motorsport | Fiat Punto S1600 | Suspension | | 0 |
| Retired SS10 | | 45 | (Sweden) Per-Gunnar Andersson | (Sweden) Jonas Andersson | (Japan) Suzuki Sport | Suzuki Ignis S1600 | Accident | | 0 |
| Retired SS9 | | 32 | (Estonia) Urmo Aava | (Estonia) Kuldar Sikk | (Japan) Suzuki Sport | Suzuki Ignis S1600 | Rear axle-shaft | | 0 |
| Retired SS8 | | 41 | (United Kingdom) Natalie Barratt | (United Kingdom) Carl Williamson | (United Kingdom) Risbridger Motorsport | Renault Clio S1600 | Engine | | 0 |
| Retired SS7 | | 36 | (United Kingdom) Kris Meeke | (United Kingdom) Chris Patterson | (United Kingdom) McRae Motorsport | Opel Corsa S1600 | Suspension | | 0 |
| Retired SS6 | | 49 | (Italy) Luca Betti | (Italy) Paolo Del Grande | (Italy) Meteco Corse | Peugeot 206 S1600 | Driveshaft | | 0 |
| Retired SS4 | | 47 | (Italy) Luca Tabaton | (Italy) Gisella Rovegno | (Italy) H.F. Grifone SRL | Fiat Punto S1600 | Accident | | 0 |
| Retired SS4 | | 48 | (Zimbabwe) Conrad Rautenbach | (Zimbabwe) Timothy Sturla | (United Kingdom) Birkbeck Rallysport | Opel Corsa S1600 | Engine | | 0 |

==== Special stages ====
| Day | Stage | Stage name | Length | Winner | Car | Time | Class leaders |
|---|---|---|---|---|---|---|---|
| Leg 1 (3 Jun) | SS1 | Lilea — Parnassos 1 | 2.25 km | (Sweden) Per-Gunnar Andersson | Suzuki Ignis S1600 | 2:06.7 | (United Kingdom) Guy Wilks |
| Leg 1 (4 Jun) | SS2 | Rengini 1 | 11.84 km | (Finland) Kosti Katajamäki | Suzuki Ignis S1600 | 9:45.8 | (Finland) Kosti Katajamäki |
| Leg 1 (4 Jun) | SS3 | Elatia — Zeli 1 | 7.57 km | Notional stage time | | | (Finland) Kosti Katajamäki |
| Leg 1 (4 Jun) | SS4 | Pavliani 1 | 24.45 km | (Estonia) Urmo Aava | Suzuki Ignis S1600 | 21:43.2 | (Sweden) Per-Gunnar Andersson |
| Leg 1 (4 Jun) | SS5 | Stromi 1 | 14.61 km | (Sweden) Per-Gunnar Andersson | Suzuki Ignis S1600 | 12:43.7 | (Sweden) Per-Gunnar Andersson |
| Leg 1 (4 Jun) | SS6 | Eleftherohori | 18.44 km | (San Marino) Mirco Baldacci | Suzuki Ignis S1600 | 12:30.6 | (Finland) Kosti Katajamäki |
| Leg 1 (4 Jun) | SS7 | Pavliani 2 | 24.45 km | (San Marino) Mirco Baldacci | Suzuki Ignis S1600 | 22:22.0 | (Finland) Kosti Katajamäki |
| Leg 1 (4 Jun) | SS8 | Stromi 2 | 14.61 km | (San Marino) Mirco Baldacci | Suzuki Ignis S1600 | 12:48.6 | (Finland) Kosti Katajamäki |
| Leg 1 (4 Jun) | SS9 | Lilea — Parnassos 2 | 2.25 km | (Sweden) Per-Gunnar Andersson | Suzuki Ignis S1600 | 2:10.3 | (Finland) Kosti Katajamäki |
| Leg 2 (5 Jun) | SS10 | Amfissa 1 | 14.59 km | (United Kingdom) Guy Wilks | Suzuki Ignis S1600 | 10:16.3 | (Finland) Kosti Katajamäki |
| Leg 2 (5 Jun) | SS11 | Drosohori 1 | 28.68 km | (San Marino) Mirco Baldacci | Suzuki Ignis S1600 | 25:02.3 | (Finland) Kosti Katajamäki |
| Leg 2 (5 Jun) | SS12 | Rengini 2 | 11.84 km | (France) Nicolas Bernardi | Renault Clio S1600 | 9:36.3 | (San Marino) Mirco Baldacci |
| Leg 2 (5 Jun) | SS13 | Elatia — Zeli 2 | 7.57 km | (France) Nicolas Bernardi | Renault Clio S1600 | 24:19.2 | (San Marino) Mirco Baldacci |
| Leg 2 (5 Jun) | SS14 | Amfissa 2 | 14.59 km | (France) Nicolas Bernardi | Renault Clio S1600 | 10:15.8 | (San Marino) Mirco Baldacci |
| Leg 2 (5 Jun) | SS15 | Drosohori 2 | 28.68 km | (France) Nicolas Bernardi | Renault Clio S1600 | 24:59.4 | (United Kingdom) Guy Wilks |
| Leg 2 (5 Jun) | SS16 | Lilea — Parnassos 3 | 2.25 km | (Belgium) Larry Cols | Renault Clio S1600 | 2:06.2 | (United Kingdom) Guy Wilks |
| Leg 3 (6 Jun) | SS17 | Dikastro 1 | 26.78 km | (France) Nicolas Bernardi | Renault Clio S1600 | 23:01.9 | (United Kingdom) Guy Wilks |
| Leg 3 (6 Jun) | SS18 | Agios Stefanos 1 | 13.47 km | (France) Nicolas Bernardi | Renault Clio S1600 | 10:51.3 | (United Kingdom) Guy Wilks |
| Leg 3 (6 Jun) | SS19 | Styrfaka 1 | 9.00 km | (France) Nicolas Bernardi | Renault Clio S1600 | 7:16.3 | (United Kingdom) Guy Wilks |
| Leg 3 (6 Jun) | SS20 | Dikastro 2 | 26.78 km | (France) Nicolas Bernardi | Renault Clio S1600 | 22:57.1 | (United Kingdom) Guy Wilks |
| Leg 3 (6 Jun) | SS21 | Agios Stefanos 2 | 13.47 km | (United Kingdom) Guy Wilks | Suzuki Ignis S1600 | 10:53.9 | (United Kingdom) Guy Wilks |
| Leg 3 (6 Jun) | SS22 | Styrfaka 2 | 9.00 km | (France) Nicolas Bernardi | Renault Clio S1600 | 6:48.8 | (United Kingdom) Guy Wilks |

==== Championship standings ====
| Pos. | Drivers' championships | | |
| Pos. | Move | Driver | Points |
|---|---|---|---|
| 1 | | (France) Nicolas Bernardi | 18 |
| 2 | New entry | (United Kingdom) Guy Wilks | 10 |
| 3 | 2 | (Belgium) Larry Cols | 9 |
| 4 | 2 | (Estonia) Urmo Aava | 8 |
| 5 | 2 | (United Kingdom) Kris Meeke | 6 |
