= Suzuki World Rally Team =

2007–2008 rallying team, participant in the World Rally Championship for Manufacturers

Suzuki Sport
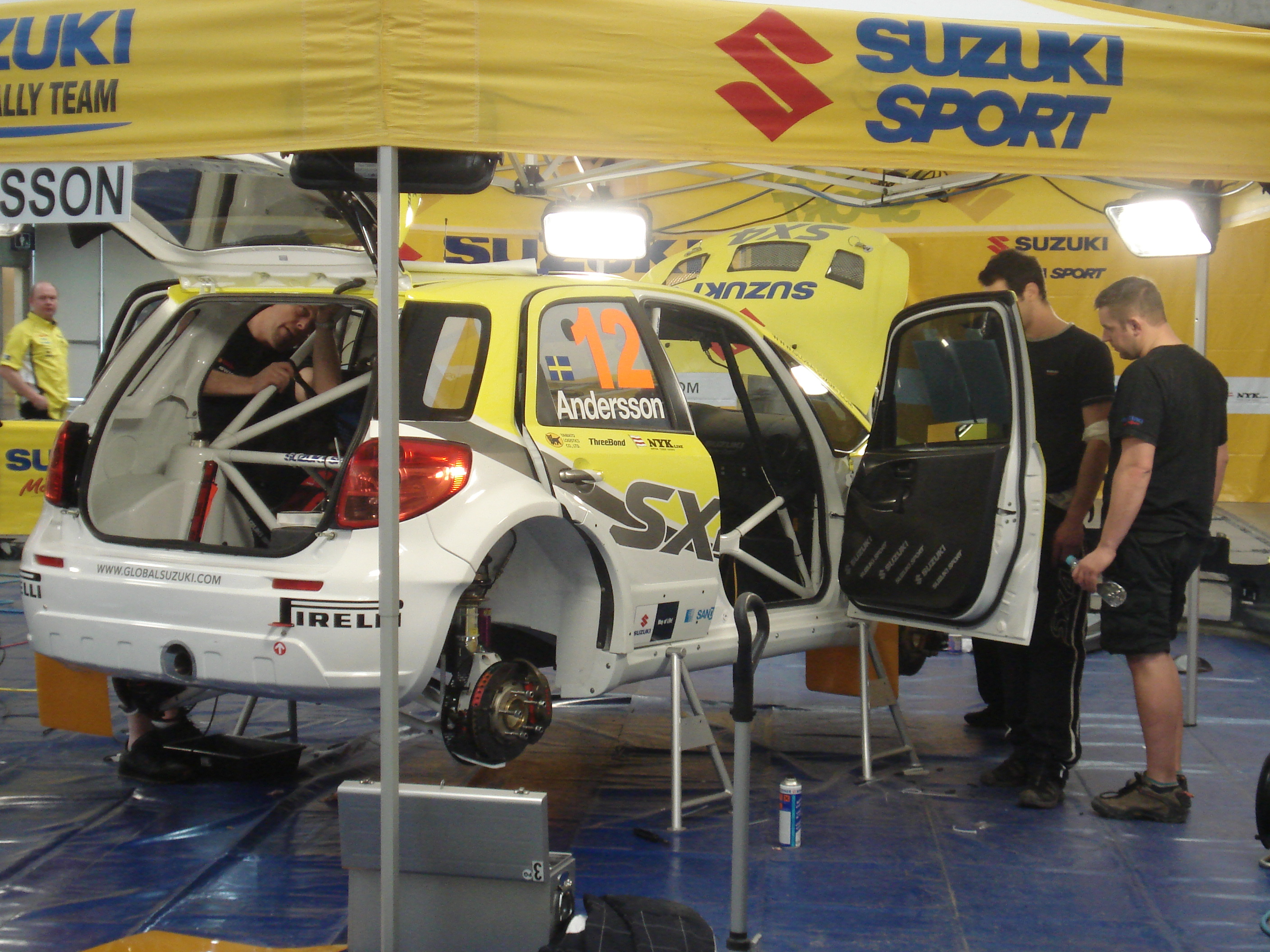
- Full name: Suzuki World Rally Team
- Team principal(s): Nobuhiro Tajima
- Technical director: Shusuke Inagaki
- Chassis: Suzuki SX4
- Tyres: Pirelli

World Rally Championship history
- Debut: 2007 Tour de Corse
- Last event: 2008 Wales Rally GB
- Manufacturers' Championships: 0
- Drivers' Championships: 0
- Rally wins: 0

The Suzuki World Rally Team, also known as the Suzuki WRC Challenge, was Suzuki's factory backed World Rally Championship team, as part of the Suzuki Sport organization. The team debuted for the first time at the 2007 Tour de Corse in France. After just one full season in 2008, in which the team finished fifth in the manufacturers' championship, Suzuki announced that they would be pulling out of the WRC. The decision was attributed to falling car sales caused by the economic crisis, although reports had surfaced that Suzuki were ready to abandon its WRC program before the economic downturn began.

== History ==
=== JWRC (2002–2007) ===
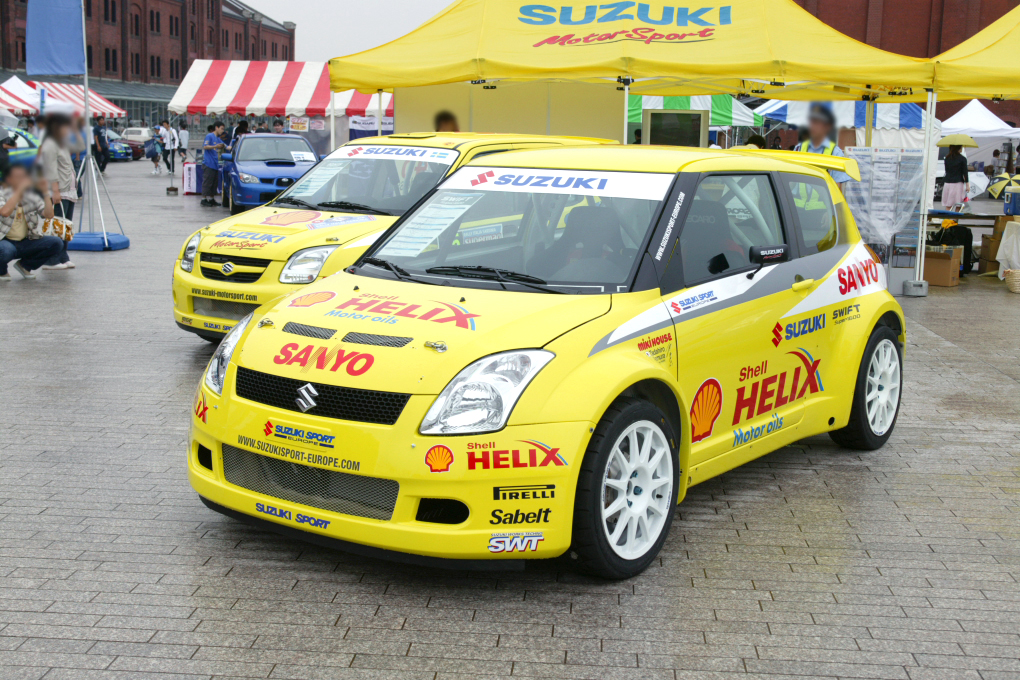
Suzuki Swift Super 1600

In 2002 Suzuki began competing in the FIA Junior World Rally Championship with a Super 1600 version of the Ignis. The following year it won two events with Daniel Carlsson and in 2004 it won the FIA Junior World Rally Championship title with Per-Gunnar Andersson. To gain experience of all the rallies in the series, Suzuki contested all 16-rounds of the WRC in 2005 and introduced a new model, the Swift S1600 in Finland. British driver Guy Wilks finished runner-up in that year's championship. In 2007 the team had its best ever year in the J-WRC. Andersson won the title for the second time, while Urmo Aava finished second in the standings in an identical Swift S1600.

=== 2007 ===
Testing of the Suzuki SX4 WRC car was conducted in Japan in February 2007, before relocating to Europe in March. Gravel testing was undertaken in Southern France in April.

The Suzuki SX4 WRC made a competitive debut in Corsica, at the 2007 Tour de Corse, driven by Nicolas Bernardi and co-driver Jean-Marc Fortin, and set several stage times just outside the top ten. The team also participated in 2007 Rally GB with driver Sebastian Lindholm and co-driver Tomi Tuominen.

=== 2008 ===
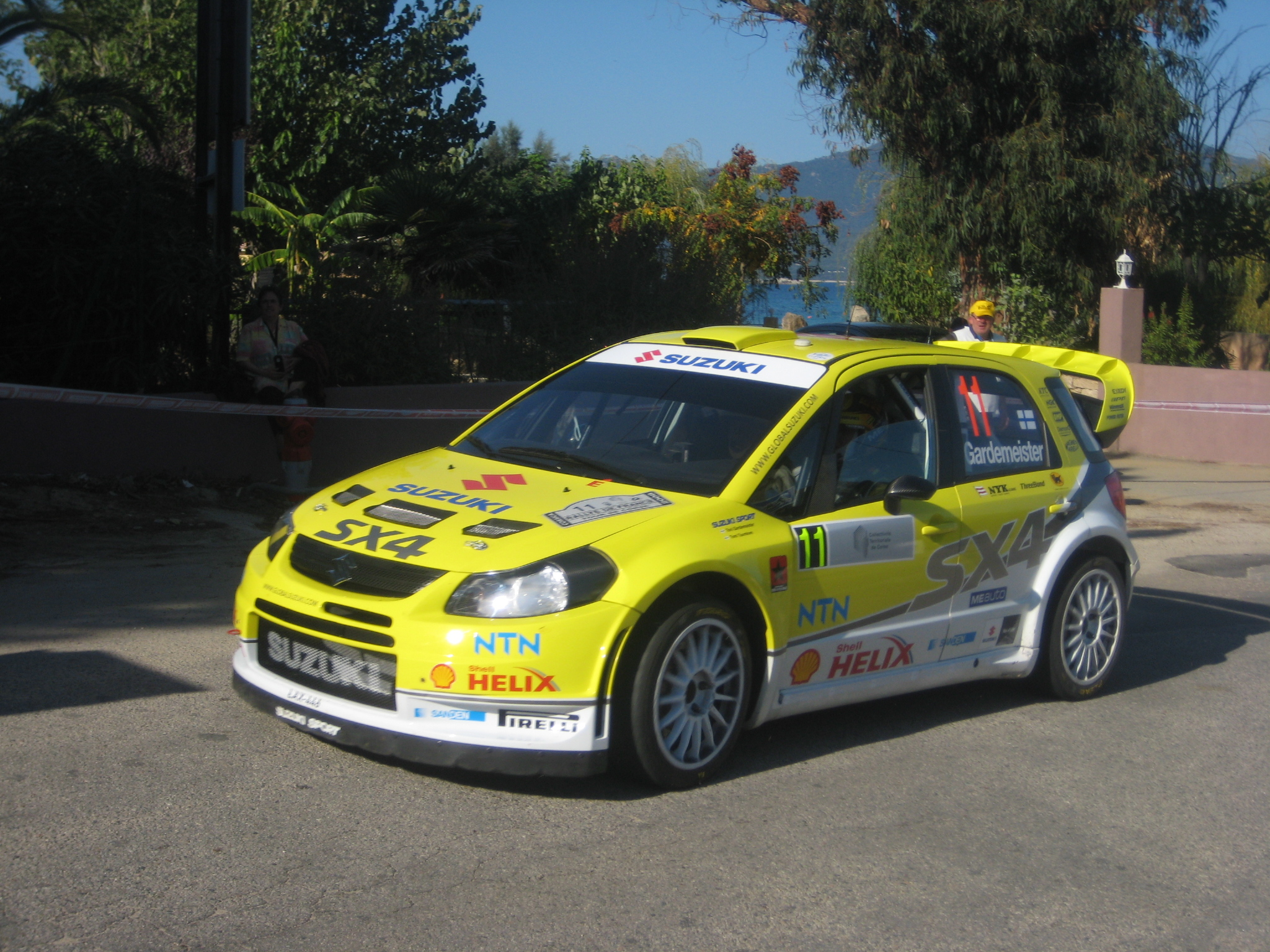
Toni Gardemeister at the 2008 Tour de Corse.

Drivers for the 2008 season were announced Monday, December 17, to be Toni Gardemeister and Per-Gunnar Andersson. Technical Director Michel Nandan has been replaced by Shusuke Inagaki and Akira Kawada has been appointed as team manager.

Suzuki scored on their proper debut with Andersson finishing eighth in the 2008 Monte Carlo Rally, with Suzuki getting two points in the manufacturers' title race. In the 2008 Swedish Rally, Gardemeister finished seventh, earning Suzuki three more manufacturers' points. Both of these early races were marred by engine problems due to faulty head gaskets, with Gardemeister retiring from the Monte Carlo Rally and Andersson retiring from the Swedish Rally, before both cars retired from the Rally of Mexico.

After struggling with reliability issues for several rallies, Suzuki achieved their best result in New Zealand, with Andersson finishing sixth and Gardemeister seventh. At their home event, the 2008 Rally Japan, the team did even better and took fifth and sixth places. During a super special stage in the Sapporo Dome, Gardemeister also gave Suzuki and the SX4 WRC their first stage win. Andersson challenged for a podium in the early stages of Rally GB before going on to finish fifth, while Gardemeister finished seventh ahead of the works Ford of Mikko Hirvonen.

== WRC Results ==
=== JWRC ===
Year	Entrant	Car	No	Driver	1	2	3	4	5	6	7	8	9	JWRC	Points
2002	Suzuki Sport	Suzuki Ignis S1600	59	(Finland) Juha Kangas	MON; 9	ESP; 11	GRE; Ret	GER; Ret	ITA; 14	GBR; Ret				–	0
2002	Suzuki Sport	Suzuki Ignis S1600	68	(Germany) Niki Schelle	MON; 6	ESP; 8	GRE; Ret	GER; 3	ITA; 7	GBR; Ret				8th	5
2002	Suzuki Sport	Suzuki Ignis S1600	75	(Japan) Kazuhiko Niwa	MON; Ret	ESP; Ret	GRE; Ret	GER; 9	ITA	GBR; Ret				–	0
2003	Suzuki Sport	Suzuki Ignis S1600	52	(Sweden) Daniel Carlsson	MON; EX	TUR; Ret	GRE; 2	FIN; 1	ITA; Ret	ESP; 4	GBR; 1			3rd	33
2003	Suzuki Sport	Suzuki Ignis S1600	64	(Finland) Ville-Pertti Teuronen	MON; Ret	TUR; 4	GRE; Ret	FIN; Ret	ITA; 4	ESP; 6	GBR; 3			6th	19
2003	Suzuki Sport	Suzuki Ignis S1600	69	(Spain) Salvador Cañellas	MON; Ret	TUR; 2	GRE; 4	FIN; 5	ITA; 2	ESP; 3	GBR; 4			2nd	36
2003	Suzuki Sport	Suzuki Ignis S1600	71	(Estonia) Urmo Aava	MON; 4	TUR; Ret	GRE; 3	FIN; 4	ITA; Ret	ESP; 5	GBR; Ret			4th	20
2004	Suzuki Sport	Suzuki Ignis S1600	31	(San Marino) Mirco Baldacci	MON; 6	GRE; Ret	TUR; 6	FIN; 4	GBR; Ret	ITA; 3	ESP; 3			5th	23
2004	Suzuki Sport	Suzuki Ignis S1600	32	(Estonia) Urmo Aava	MON; 2	GRE; Ret	TUR; 5	FIN; 5	GBR; Ret	ITA; Ret	ESP; Ret			8th	16
2004	Suzuki Sport	Suzuki Ignis S1600	33	(United Kingdom) Guy Wilks	MON; Ret	GRE; 1	TUR; 3	FIN; Ret	GBR; 1	ITA; 2	ESP; Ret			3rd	34
2004	Suzuki Sport	Suzuki Ignis S1600	35	(Finland) Kosti Katajamäki	MON; Ret	GRE; Ret	TUR; 2	FIN; 2	GBR; 3	ITA; 4	ESP; 5			4th	31
2004	Suzuki Sport	Suzuki Ignis S1600	43	(Finland) Jari-Matti Latvala	MON	GRE	TUR	FIN; Ret	GBR; 4	ITA; Ret	ESP; 9			13th	5
2004	Suzuki Sport	Suzuki Ignis S1600	45	(Sweden) Per-Gunnar Andersson	MON; 8	GRE; Ret	TUR; 1	FIN; 1	GBR; Ret	ITA; 1	ESP; 2			1st	39
2005	Suzuki Sport Europe	Suzuki Ignis S1600	31	(Sweden) Per-Gunnar Andersson	MON; 6	MEX; 2	ITA; 5	GRE; 1						6th	30
2005	Suzuki Sport Europe	Suzuki Swift S1600	31	(Sweden) Per-Gunnar Andersson					FIN; Ret	GER; 4	FRA	ESP; Ret		6th	30
2005	Suzuki Sport Europe	Suzuki Ignis S1600	32	(United Kingdom) Guy Wilks	MON; 7	MEX; 1	ITA; 6	GRE; 2						2nd	35
2005	Suzuki Sport Europe	Suzuki Swift S1600	32	(United Kingdom) Guy Wilks					FIN; 3	GER; 3	FRA	ESP; Ret		2nd	35
2005	Suzuki Sport Europe	Suzuki Ignis S1600	33	(Finland) Kosti Katajamäki	MON; 2	MEX	ITA; Ret	GRE; 4	FIN; Ret	GER; 5	FRA; 3	ESP; 2		5th	31
2005	Suzuki Sport Europe	Suzuki Ignis S1600	36	(Estonia) Urmo Aava	MON; Ret	MEX	ITA; 2	GRE; 3	FIN; 2	GER; Ret	FRA; 4	ESP; 4		4th	32
2006	Suzuki Sport Europe	Suzuki Swift S1600	33	(Estonia) Urmo Aava	SWE; 3	ESP	FRA; 2	ARG	ITA; 3	GER	FIN; DSQ	TUR; 1	GBR; 9	2nd	31
2006	Suzuki Sport Europe	Suzuki Swift S1600	35	(Sweden) Per-Gunnar Andersson	SWE; 1	ESP	FRA	ARG; 3	ITA; 4	GER	FIN; 2	TUR; DSQ	GBR; Ret	3rd	29
2006	Suzuki Sport Europe	Suzuki Swift S1600	37	(Czech Republic) Pavel Valoušek	SWE; 4	ESP	FRA; Ret	ARG	ITA; 14	GER; 3	FIN; 12	TUR; 13	GBR	15th	11
2006	Suzuki Sport Europe	Suzuki Swift S1600	43	(Estonia) Jaan Mölder	SWE	ESP	FRA	ARG	ITA	GER	FIN	TUR	GBR; 1	9th	18
2006	Suzuki Sport Europe	Suzuki Swift S1600	48	(United Kingdom) Guy Wilks	SWE; 9	ESP	FRA	ARG; 1	ITA; 8	GER	FIN; 1	TUR; 4	GBR; 11	4th	26
2007	Suzuki Sport Europe	Suzuki Swift S1600	33	(Estonia) Urmo Aava	NOR; 3	POR; 2	ITA; 1	FIN	GER; 2	ESP; 3	FRA; Ret			2nd	38
2007	Suzuki Sport Europe	Suzuki Swift S1600	36	(Estonia) Jaan Mölder	NOR; 4	POR; 4	ITA; 5	FIN; 13	GER; 6	ESP; 6	FRA			5th	20
2007	Suzuki Sport Europe	Suzuki Swift S1600	42	(Estonia) Aigar Pärs	NOR; 12	POR; 14	ITA; Ret	FIN; Ret	GER; 8	ESP	FRA; Ret			21st	1
2007	Suzuki Sport Europe	Suzuki Swift S1600	43	(Latvia) Vilius Rožukas	NOR; 11	POR; 8	ITA; 9	FIN; 6	GER	ESP	FRA			12th	4
2007	Suzuki Sport Europe	Suzuki Swift S1600	45	(Sweden) Per-Gunnar Andersson	NOR; 1	POR; 1	ITA; 2	FIN	GER	ESP; 1	FRA; 4			1st	43
2007	Suzuki Sport Europe	Suzuki Swift S1600	45	(United Kingdom) James Wozencroft	NOR	POR	ITA	FIN	GER; 13	ESP	FRA			–	0
2008	Suzuki Sport Europe	Suzuki Swift S1600	32	(Estonia) Jaan Mölder	MEX; 2	JOR; Ret	ITA; 9	FIN; Ret	GER	ESP; 6	FRA; 11			8th	11
2008	Suzuki Sport Europe	Suzuki Swift S1600	35	(Poland) Michał Kościuszko	MEX; 3	JOR; Ret	ITA; 1	FIN; 3	GER	ESP; 9	FRA; Ret			5th	22
2008	Suzuki Sport Europe	Suzuki Swift S1600	43	(Germany) Florian Niegel	MEX	JOR; 4	ITA; Ret	FIN	GER; 8	ESP; 10	FRA; 7			11th	8
2008	Suzuki Sport Europe	Suzuki Swift S1600	60	(France) Pierre Marche	MEX	JOR	ITA	FIN	GER	ESP	FRA; 4			15th	5
2009	Suzuki Sport Europe	Suzuki Swift S1600	31	(Germany) Aaron Burkart	IRE; 1	CYP; 3	POR	ARG; 2	ITA; 3	POL	FIN; 4	ESP; 5		3rd	39
2009	Suzuki Sport Europe	Suzuki Swift S1600	32	(Poland) Michał Kościuszko	IRE	CYP; 2	POR; 1	ARG; 1	ITA; 2	POL; Ret	FIN; 3	ESP		2nd	42
2009	Suzuki Sport Europe	Suzuki Swift S1600	33	(Italy) Simone Bertolotti	IRE; 3	CYP	POR; 6	ARG	ITA; 7	POL; 5	FIN; 6	ESP; 2		6th	26
2010	Suzuki Sport Europe	Suzuki Swift S1600	21	(Germany) Aaron Burkart	TUR; 1	POR; 3	BUL	GER; 2	FRA; 5	ESP; 4				1st	80
2010	World Rally Team Estonia	Suzuki Swift S1600	30	(Estonia) Karl Kruuda	TUR; 6	POR; 2	BUL; 5	GER; 3	FRA	ESP				4th	51

=== WRC ===
Year	Car	No	Driver	1	2	3	4	5	6	7	8	9	10	11	12	13	14	15	16	WDC	Points	TC	Points
2007	Suzuki SX4 WRC	19	(France) Nicolas Bernardi	MON	SWE	NOR	MEX	POR	ARG	ITA	GRE	FIN	GER	NZL	ESP	FRA; 31	JPN	IRE		–	0	–	0
2007	Suzuki SX4 WRC	19	(Finland) Sebastian Lindholm																GBR; 27	–	0	–	0
2008	Suzuki SX4 WRC	11	(Finland) Toni Gardemeister	MON; Ret	SWE; 7	MEX; Ret	ARG; Ret	JOR; Ret	ITA; Ret	GRE; 9	TUR; Ret	FIN; 8	GER; 10	NZL; 7	ESP; 13	FRA; 13	JPN; 6	GBR; 7		13th	10	5th	34
2008	Suzuki SX4 WRC	12	(Sweden) Per-Gunnar Andersson	MON; 8	SWE; Ret	MEX; Ret	ARG; 24	JOR; Ret	ITA; 9	GRE; 11	TUR; Ret	FIN; Ret	GER; 15	NZL; 6	ESP; 32	FRA; 17	JPN; 5	GBR; 5		12th	12	5th	34

== Gallery ==
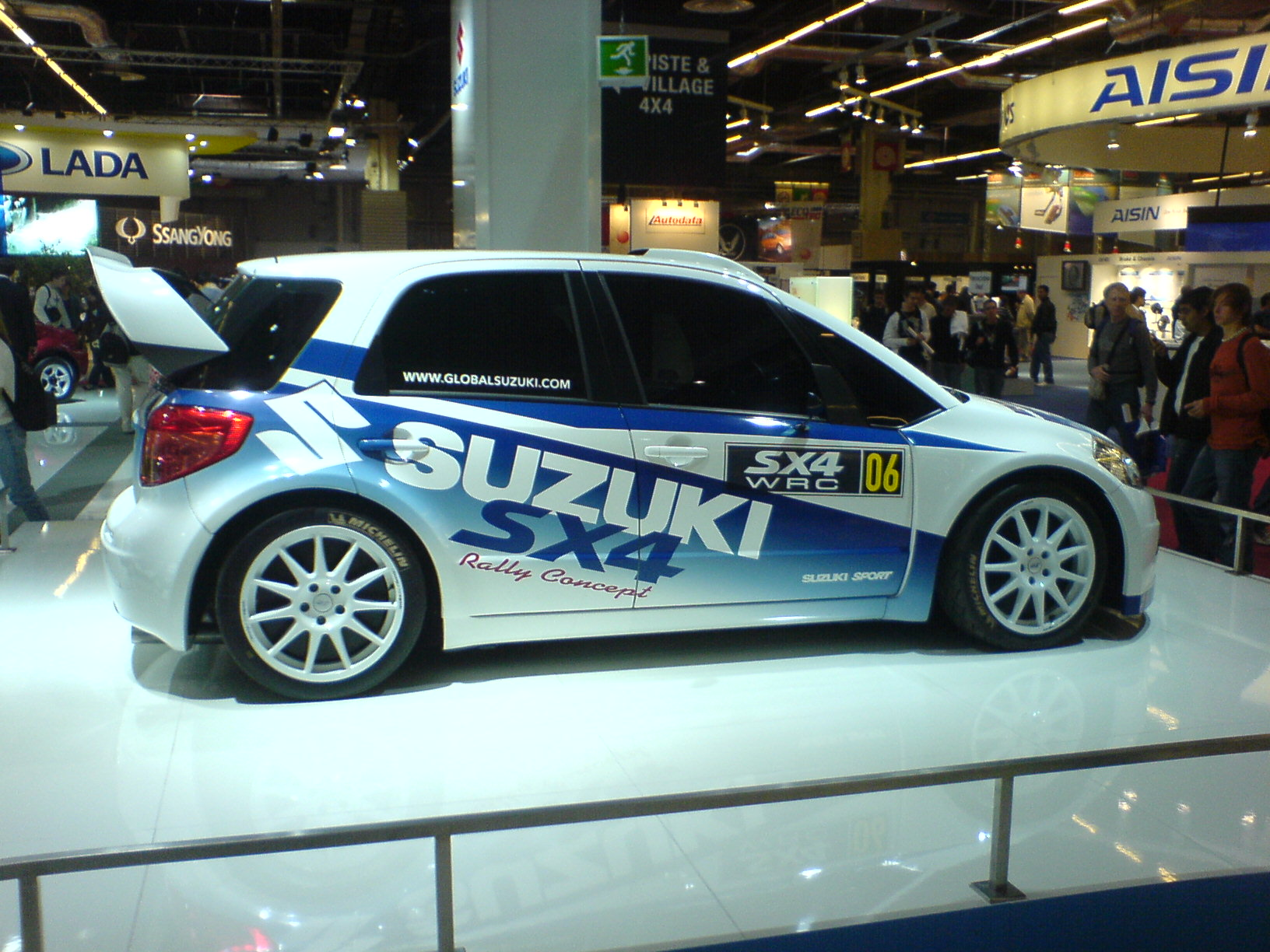
SX4 WRC in Paris in 2006.

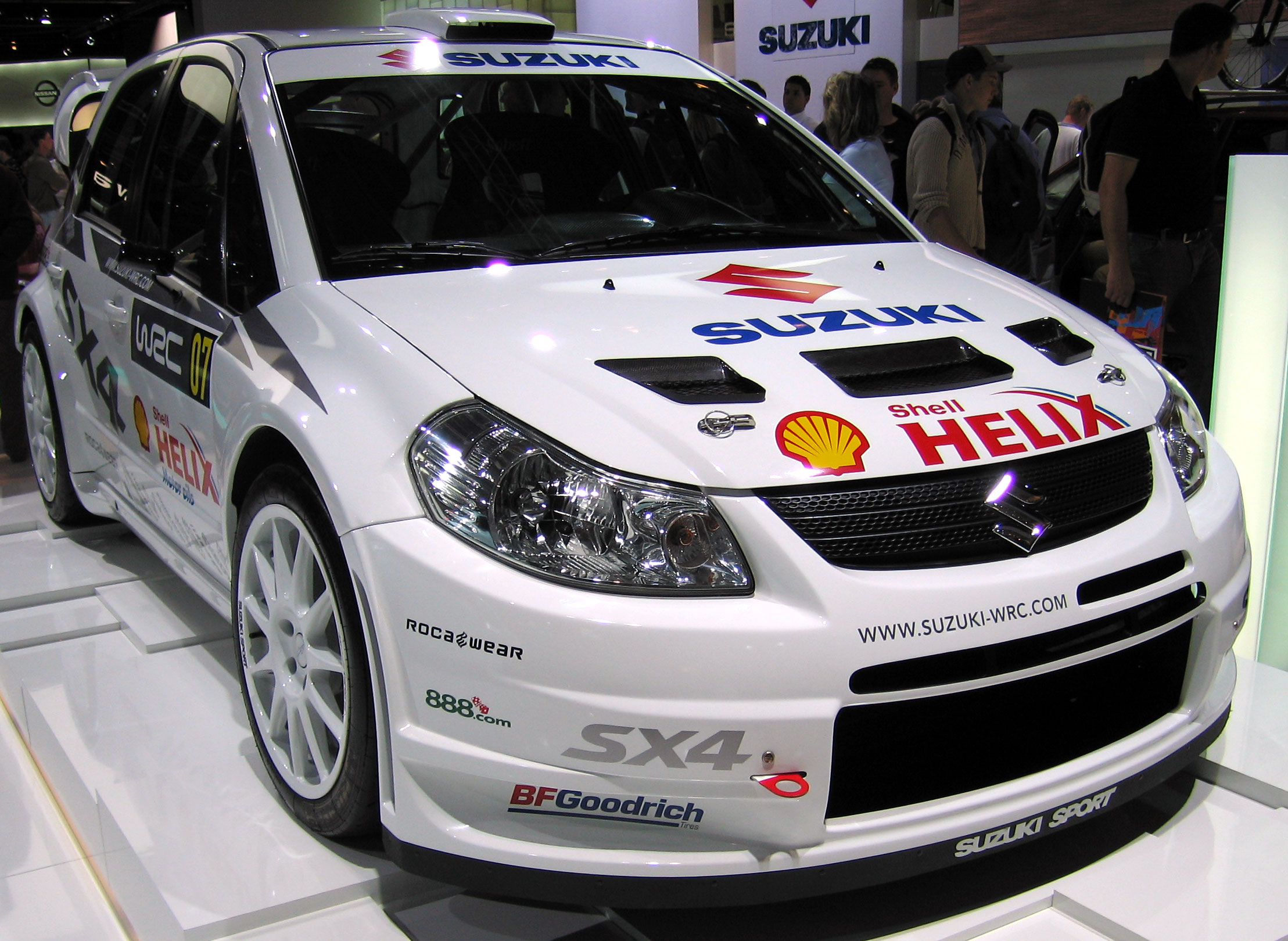
SX4 WRC at the 2007 Frankfurt Motor Show.

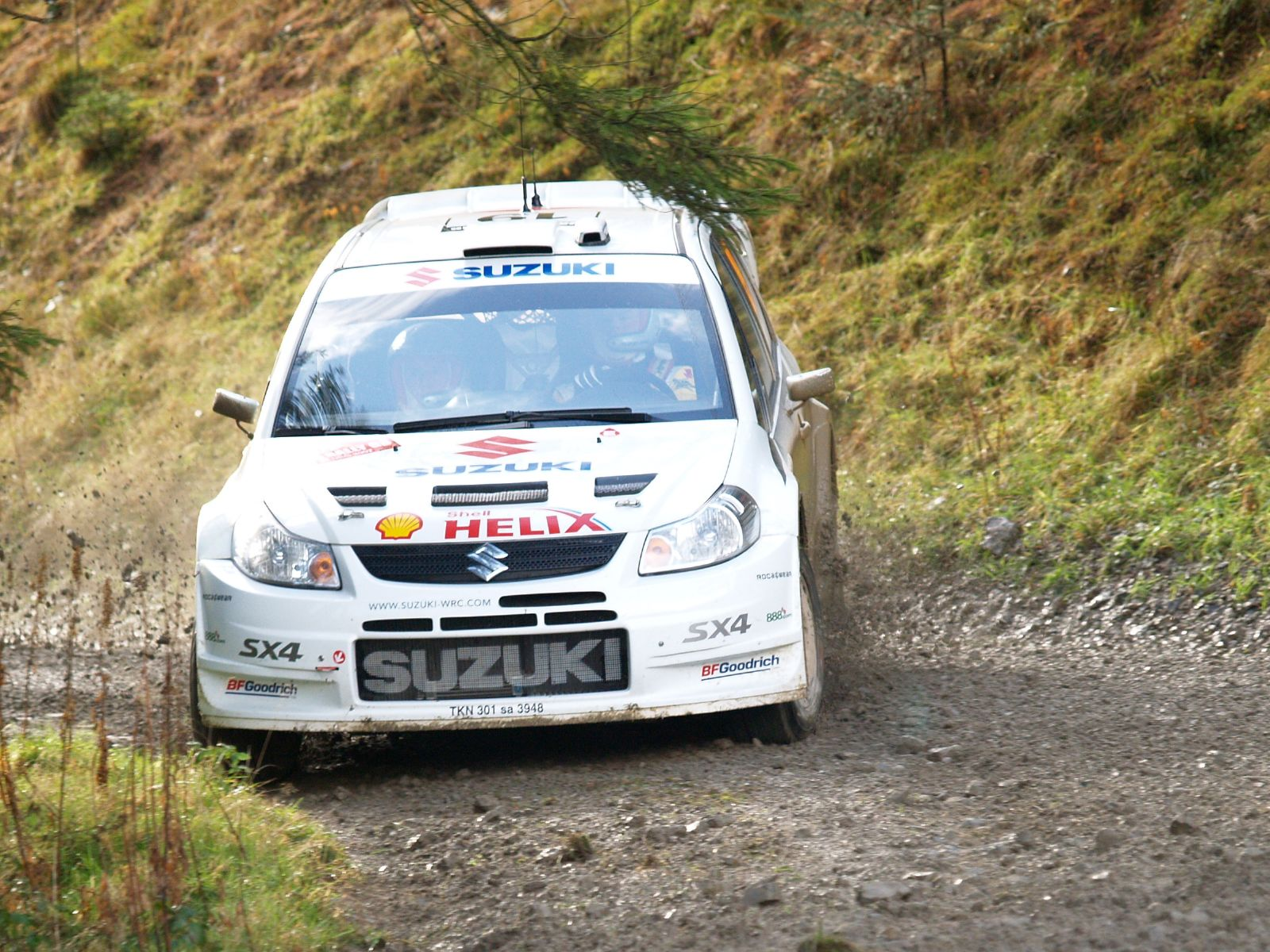
Sebastian Lindholm at the 2007 Wales Rally GB.

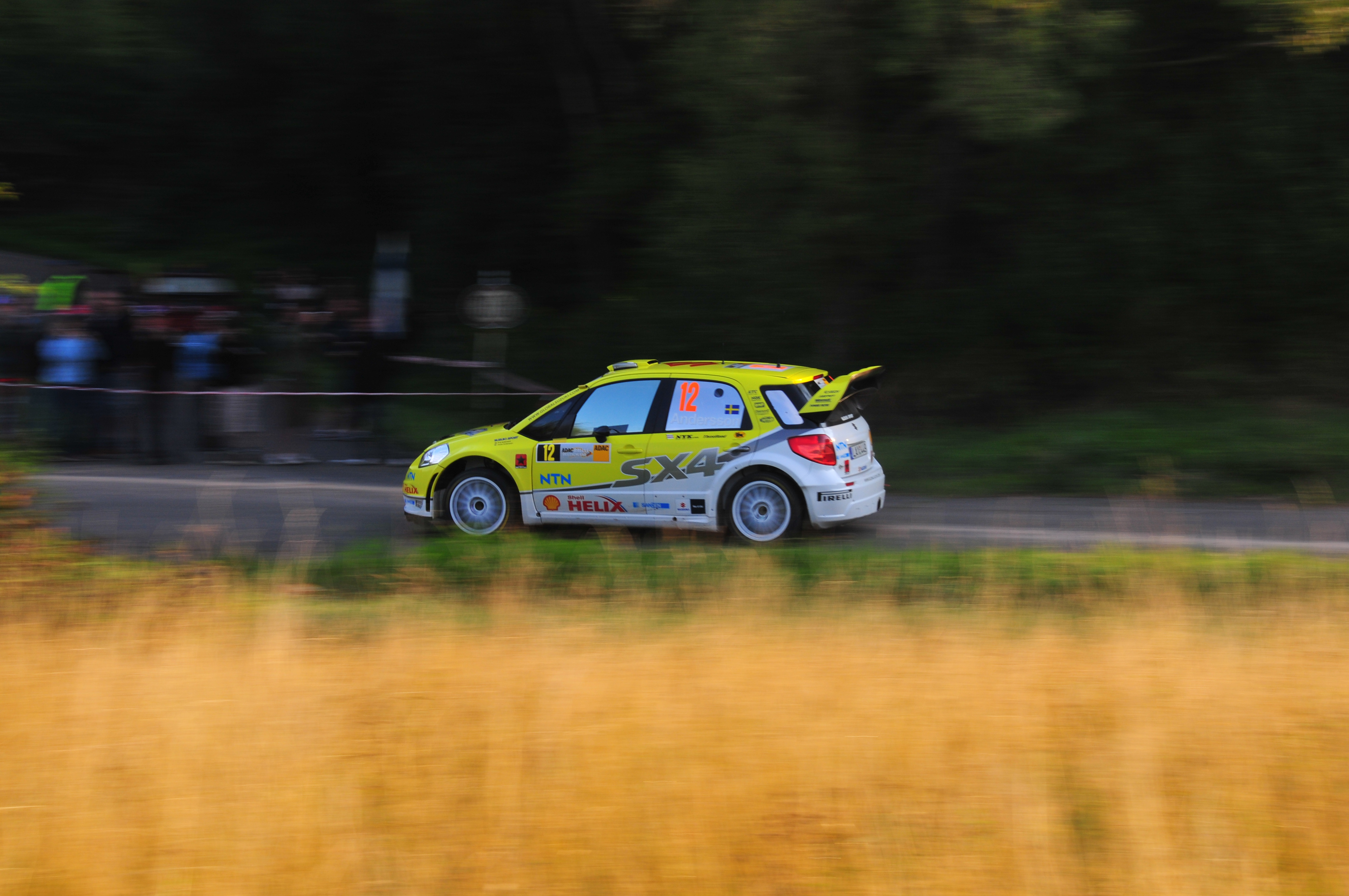
PG Andersson at the 2008 Rallye Deutschland.

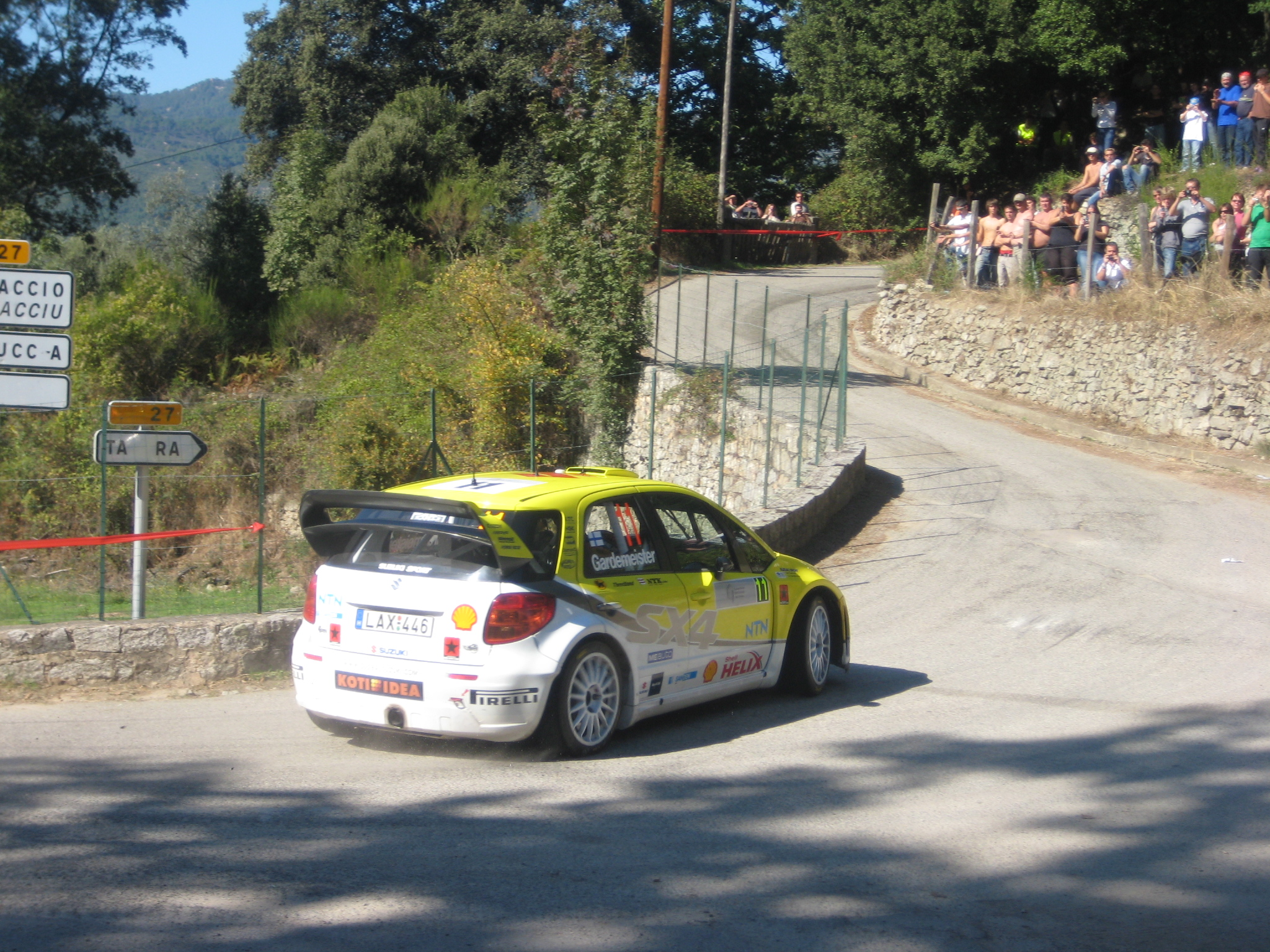
Toni Gardemeister at the 2008 Tour de Corse

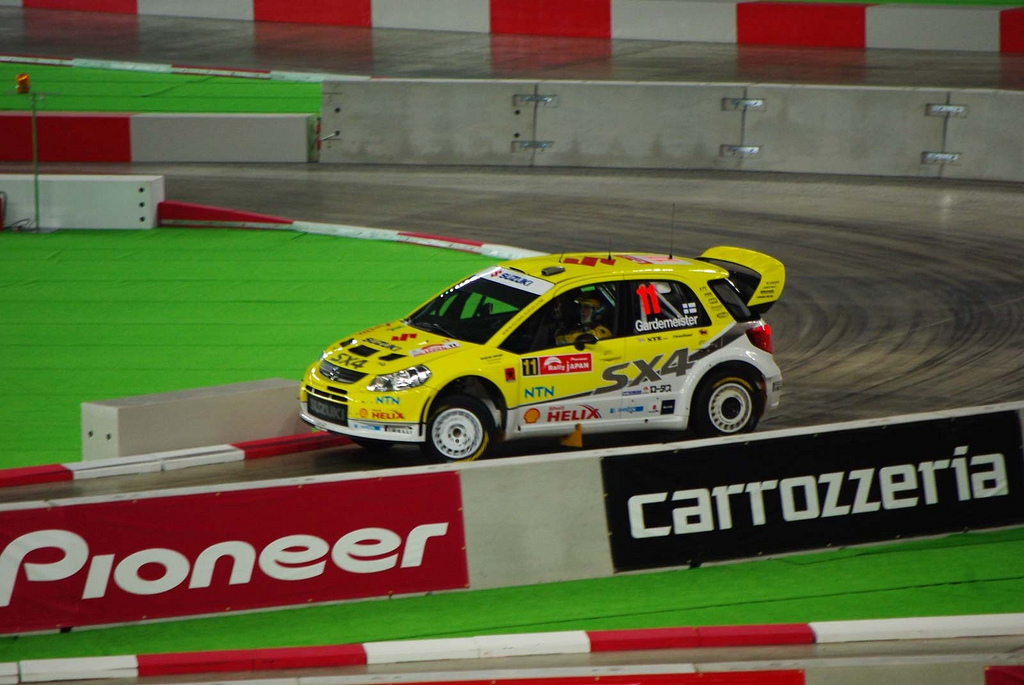
Gardemeister at the 2008 Rally Japan.
