= Bozian Racing =

Auto racing team

(France) Bozian Racing
- Full name: Bozian Racing
- Chassis: Peugeot 206 WRC; Peugeot 307 WRC
- Tyres: Michelin

World Rally Championship history
- Debut: 2002 Monte Carlo Rally
- Last event: 2009 Rally Catalunya
- Manufacturers' Championships: 0
- Drivers' Championships: 0
- Rally wins: 0

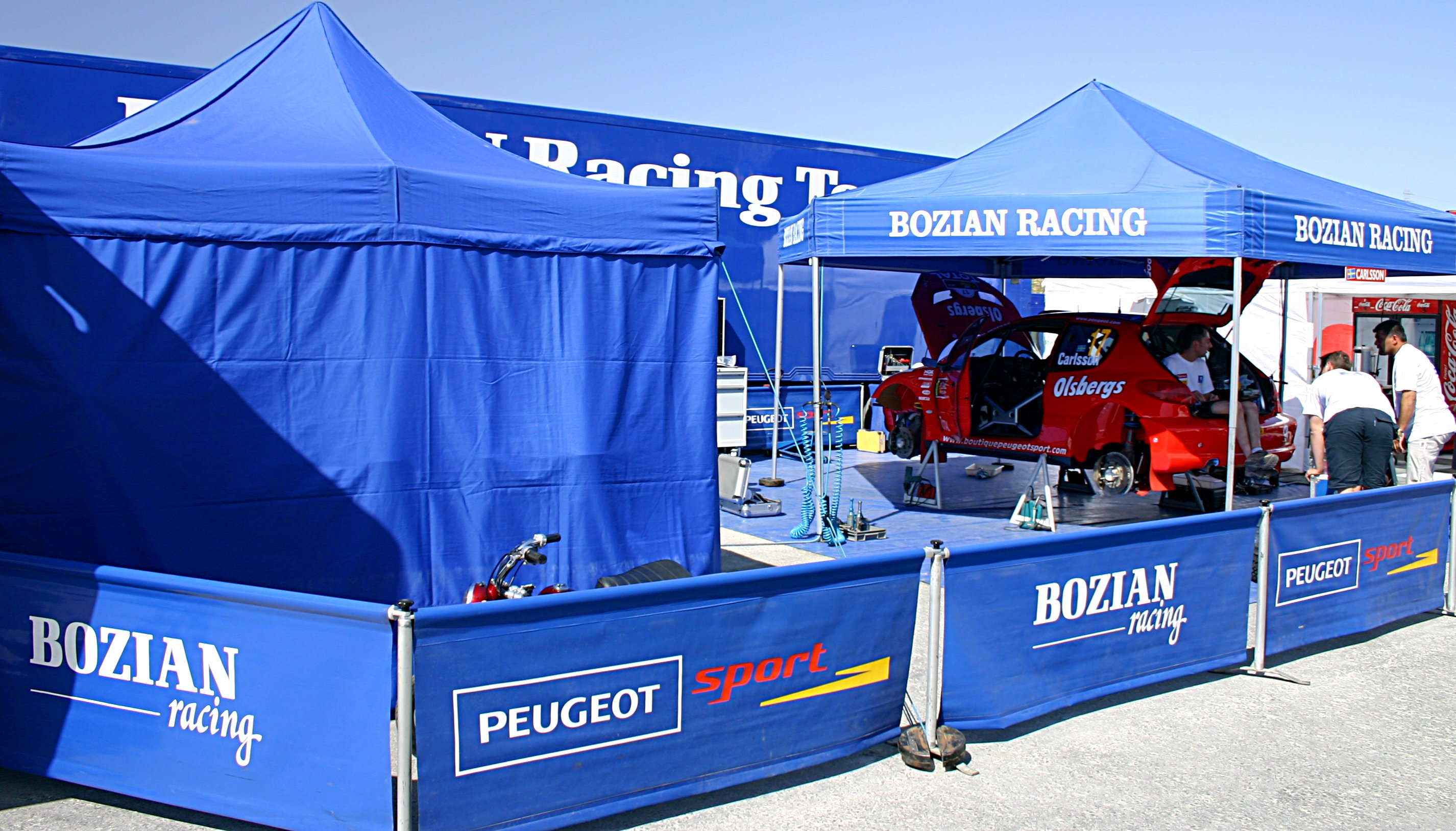
Bozian Racing and Daniel Carlsson's Peugeot 206 WRC at the 2005 Cyprus Rally.

Bozian Racing is a French auto racing team founded in 1969 by Arthur Bozian. Although it also run in circuits, the rally represents the principal activity of the team. It was related to Renault for a long time. In 2002, Bozian Racing became the satellite team of Peugeot Sport, while engagement in particular, on several rallies of the WRC, running names such as Gilles Panizzi, Harri Rovanperä and Cédric Robert. In 2006 Bozian Racing took, to some extent, the relay of Peugeot Sport, which was withdrawn from the WRC at the end of the 2005 season, by engaging two Peugeot 307 WRCs in the Manufacturer 2 championship, running with the Austrian Manfred Stohl and the Norwegian Henning Solberg under the name of OMV Peugeot Norway.

== WRC Results ==
Year	Car	Driver	1	2	3	4	5	6	7	8	9	10	11	12	13	14	15	16	WDC	Points	WDC	Points
2002	Peugeot 206 WRC		MON	SWE	FRA	ESP	CYP	ARG	GRC	KEN	FIN	GER	ITA	NZL	AUS	GBR					-	-
2002	Peugeot 206 WRC	(Finland) Harri Rovanperä	Ret		11	7							9						7th	30	-	-
2002	Peugeot 206 WRC	(France) Gilles Panizzi		16					Ret							11			6th	31	-	-
2002	Peugeot 206 WRC	(France) Cédric Robert											7						-	0	-	-
2003	Peugeot 206 WRC		MON	SWE	TUR	NZL	ARG	GRC	CYP	GER	FIN	AUS	ITA	FRA	ESP	GBR					-	-
2003	Peugeot 206 WRC	(Czech Republic) Roman Kresta	10	14				Ret		Ret			11		13	8			21st	1	-	-
2003	Peugeot 206 WRC	(France) Gilles Panizzi			5			7	Ret							Ret			10th	27	-	-
2003	Peugeot 206 WRC	(Finland) Juuso Pykälistö		Ret	11			Ret	Ret		9					9			-	0	-	-
2003	Peugeot 206 WRC	(Finland) Ari Vatanen									11								-	0	-	-
2004	Peugeot 206 WRC		MON	SWE	MEX	NZL	CYP	GRE	TUR	ARG	FIN	GER	JPN	GBR	ITA	FRA	ESP	AUS			-	-
2004	Peugeot 206 WRC	(France) Nicolas Vouilloz	Ret					Ret				12		9	Ret	Ret	10		-	0	-	-
2004	Peugeot 206 WRC	(Portugal) Miguel Campos	Ret				8												32nd	1	-	-
2004	Peugeot 206 WRC	(Norway) Henning Solberg		6		Ret	Ret		Ret		10			11	Ret				19th	3	-	-
2004	Peugeot 206 WRC	(Sweden) Daniel Carlsson		8		8		5	Ret		9	Ret				11			12th	6	-	-
2004	Peugeot 206 WRC	(Argentina) Luís Pérez Companc			Ret		Ret			6					Ret				23rd	3	-	-
2005	Peugeot 307 WRC Peugeot 206 WRC		MON	SWE	MEX	NZL	ITA	CYP	TUR	GRE	ARG	FIN	GER	GBR	JPN	FRA	ESP	AUS			-	-
2005	Peugeot 307 WRC Peugeot 206 WRC	(Sweden) Daniel Carlsson		6				8			15								19th	5	-	-
2005	Peugeot 307 WRC Peugeot 206 WRC	(Argentina) Marcos Ligato									13								-	0	-	-
2005	Peugeot 307 WRC Peugeot 206 WRC	(Spain) Xavier Pons			10		Ret												16th	7	-	-
2005	Peugeot 307 WRC Peugeot 206 WRC	(France) Didier Auriol	Ret																–	0	-	-
2005	Peugeot 307 WRC Peugeot 206 WRC	(Mexico) Ricardo Triviño			12						18						20		–	0	-	-
2006	Peugeot 307 WRC		MON	SWE	MEX	ESP	FRA	ARG	ITA	GRE	GER	FIN	JPN	CYP	TUR	AUS	NZL	GBR			4th	88
2006	Peugeot 307 WRC	(Austria) Manfred Stohl	4	18	3	12	7	4	7	Ret	5	9	5	4	8	3	3	2	4th	54	4th	88
2006	Peugeot 307 WRC	(Norway) Henning Solberg	Ret	8	5			7	Ret	5		4		6	3	Ret	12	11	8th	25	4th	88
2006	Peugeot 307 WRC	(Italy) Gigi Galli					9	3	Ret			5							11th	15	4th	88
2007	Peugeot 307 WRC		MON	SWE	NOR	MEX	POR	ARG	ITA	GRE	FIN	GER	NZL	ESP	FRA	JPN	IRE	GBR			-	-
2007	Peugeot 307 WRC	(Switzerland) Philippe Roux	16																-	0	-	-
2007	Peugeot 307 WRC	(Norway) Anders Kjaer			23														-	0	-	-
2009	Peugeot 307 WRC		IRE	NOR	CYP	POR	ARG	ITA	GRE	POL	FIN	AUS	ESP	GBR					-	0	-	-
2009	Peugeot 307 WRC	(France) Dany Snobeck											10						-	0	-	-
