= 2001 Rally Finland =

Motor rally competition

2001 Rally Finland 51st Neste Rally Finland
Round 9 of the 2001 World Rally Championship season
← Previous event	Next event →
- Host country: Finland
- Rally base: Jyväskylä
- Dates run: August 24, 2001 – August 26, 2001
- Stages: 21 (406.38 km; 252.51 miles)
- Stage surface: Gravel
- Overall distance: 1,677.13 km (1,042.12 miles)

Statistics
- Crews: 160 at start, 79 at finish

Overall results
- Overall winner: (Finland) Marcus Grönholm (Finland) Timo Rautiainen (France) Peugeot Total; Peugeot 206 WRC

The 2001 Rally Finland (formally the 51st Neste Rally Finland) was the ninth round of the 2001 World Rally Championship. The race was held over three days between 24 August and 26 August 2001, and was won by Peugeot's Marcus Grönholm, his 5th win in the World Rally Championship.

== Background ==
=== Entry list ===
No.	Driver	Co-Driver	Entrant	Car	Tyre
World Rally Championship manufacturer entries
1	(Finland) Marcus Grönholm	(Finland) Timo Rautiainen	(France) Peugeot Total	Peugeot 206 WRC	MI
3	(Spain) Carlos Sainz	(Spain) Luis Moya	(United Kingdom) Ford Motor Co. Ltd.	Ford Focus RS WRC '01	P
4	(United Kingdom) Colin McRae	(United Kingdom) Nicky Grist	(United Kingdom) Ford Motor Co. Ltd.	Ford Focus RS WRC '01	P
5	(United Kingdom) Richard Burns	(United Kingdom) Robert Reid	(Japan) Subaru World Rally Team	Subaru Impreza S7 WRC '01	P
6	(Norway) Petter Solberg	(United Kingdom) Phil Mills	(Japan) Subaru World Rally Team	Subaru Impreza S7 WRC '01	P
7	(Finland) Tommi Mäkinen	(Finland) Risto Mannisenmäki	(Japan) Marlboro Mitsubishi Ralliart	Mitsubishi Lancer Evo 6.5	MI
9	(Sweden) Kenneth Eriksson	(Sweden) Staffan Parmander	(South Korea) Hyundai Castrol World Rally Team	Hyundai Accent WRC2	MI
11	(Germany) Armin Schwarz	(Germany) Manfred Hiemer	(Czech Republic) Škoda Motorsport	Škoda Octavia WRC Evo2	MI
12	(Belgium) Bruno Thiry	(Belgium) Georges Biar	(Czech Republic) Škoda Motorsport	Škoda Octavia WRC Evo2	MI
16	(Finland) Harri Rovanperä	(Finland) Risto Pietiläinen	(France) Peugeot Total	Peugeot 206 WRC	MI
19	(Finland) Toni Gardemeister	(Finland) Paavo Lukander	(Japan) Marlboro Mitsubishi Ralliart	Mitsubishi Carisma GT Evo VI	MI
20	(Finland) Juha Kankkunen	(Finland) Juha Repo	(South Korea) Hyundai Castrol World Rally Team	Hyundai Accent WRC2	MI
World Rally Championship entries
2	(France) Didier Auriol	(France) Denis Giraudet	(France) Peugeot Total	Peugeot 206 WRC	MI
8	(Belgium) Freddy Loix	(Belgium) Sven Smeets	(Japan) Marlboro Mitsubishi Ralliart	Mitsubishi Carisma GT Evo VI	MI
10	(United Kingdom) Alister McRae	(United Kingdom) David Senior	(South Korea) Hyundai Castrol World Rally Team	Hyundai Accent WRC2	MI
17	(France) François Delecour	(France) Daniel Grataloup	(United Kingdom) Ford Motor Co. Ltd.	Ford Focus RS WRC '01	P
18	(Estonia) Markko Märtin	(United Kingdom) Michael Park	(Japan) Subaru World Rally Team	Subaru Impreza S7 WRC '01	P
21	(Sweden) Stig Blomqvist	(Venezuela) Ana Goni	(Czech Republic) Škoda Motorsport	Škoda Octavia WRC Evo2	MI
22	(Finland) Pasi Hagström	(Finland) Tero Gardemeister	(Finland) Pasi Hagström	Toyota Corolla WRC	MI
23	(Finland) Sebastian Lindholm	(Finland) Timo Hantunen	(Finland) Sebastian Lindholm	Peugeot 206 WRC	MI
24	(Finland) Jani Paasonen	(Finland) Arto Kapanen	(Finland) Jani Paasonen	Ford Focus RS WRC '01	P
25	(France) Gilles Panizzi	(France) Hervé Panizzi	(France) H.F. Grifone SRL	Peugeot 206 WRC	MI
26	(Finland) Janne Tuohino	(Finland) Petri Vihavainen	(Finland) Janne Tuohino	Toyota Corolla WRC	—N/a
27	(Finland) Juuso Pykälistö	(Finland) Esko Mertsalmi	(Finland) Juuso Pykälistö	Toyota Corolla WRC	—N/a
28	(Finland) Juha Kangas	(Finland) Mika Ovaskainen	(Finland) Juha Kangas	Toyota Corolla WRC	—N/a
29	(Finland) Markku Alén	(Finland) Ilkka Riipinen	(Finland) Blue Rose Team	Ford Focus WRC '99	P
30	(Austria) Raphael Sperrer	(Sweden) Per Carlsson	(Austria) Raphael Sperrer	Peugeot 206 WRC	MI
31	(Sweden) Daniel Carlsson	(Sweden) Benny Melander	(Sweden) Daniel Carlsson	Toyota Corolla WRC	MI
32	(Finland) Jouni Ahvenlammi	(Finland) Teppo Leino	(Finland) Jouni Ahvenlammi	Toyota Corolla WRC	—N/a
33	(United Kingdom) Neil Wearden	(United Kingdom) Trevor Agnew	(United Kingdom) Neil Wearden	Peugeot 206 WRC	—N/a
34	(Oman) Hamed Al-Wahaibi	(New Zealand) Tony Sircombe	Oman Arab World Rally Team	Subaru Impreza S6 WRC '00	—N/a
35	(Norway) Henning Solberg	(Norway) Cato Menkerud	(Norway) Henning Solberg	Toyota Corolla WRC	MI
37	(Finland) Jari Viita	(Finland) Riku Rousku	(Finland) Jari Viita	Ford Focus WRC '99	—N/a
82	(Austria) Achim Mörtl	(Austria) Stefan Eichhorner	(Austria) Promotor World Rally Team	Subaru Impreza S6 WRC '00	P
83	(Finland) Jarmo Mikkonen	(Finland) Jari Kiviniemi	(Finland) Jarmo Mikkonen	Mitsubishi Lancer Evo VI	—N/a
93	(Finland) Jyri Poltto	(Finland) Aki Suutarinen	(Finland) Jyri Poltto	Mitsubishi Lancer Evo	—N/a
104	(Germany) Antony Warmbold	(United Kingdom) Gemma Price	(Germany) Antony Warmbold	Toyota Corolla WRC	—N/a
106	(Finland) Harri Välimäki	(Finland) Juha Heikkilä	(Finland) Harri Välimäki	Mitsubishi Lancer Evo	—N/a
118	(Finland) Pekka Savela	(Finland) Hannu Ervasto	(Finland) Pekka Savela	Mitsubishi Carisma GT	—N/a
121	(Italy) Fabrizio De Sanctis	(Italy) Marco Neirotti	(Italy) Fabrizio De Sanctis	Mitsubishi Lancer Evo VI	—N/a
123	(Republic of Ireland) Hugh Dunne	(Republic of Ireland) Greg Shinnors	(Republic of Ireland) Hugh Dunne	Subaru Legacy RS	—N/a
Group N Cup entries
38	(Finland) Jouko Puhakka	(Finland) Keijo Eerola	Mitsubishi Ralliart Finland	Mitsubishi Carisma GT	P
39	(Finland) Jouni Ampuja	(Finland) Jarmo Lehtinen	(Finland) Jouni Ampuja	Mitsubishi Carisma GT Evo VI	MI
40	(Argentina) Gabriel Pozzo	(Argentina) Daniel Stillo	(Argentina) Gabriel Pozzo	Mitsubishi Lancer Evo VI	P
42	(Finland) Kristian Sohlberg	(Finland) Jukka Aho	(Finland) Kristian Sohlberg	Mitsubishi Carisma GT	—N/a
43	(Italy) Gianluigi Galli	(Italy) Rudy Pollet	(Italy) Gianluigi Galli	Mitsubishi Lancer Evo VI	—N/a
44	(Sweden) Kenneth Bäcklund	(Sweden) Tord Andersson	(Sweden) Kenneth Bäcklund	Mitsubishi Lancer Evo VI	—N/a
45	(Finland) Marko Ipatti	(Finland) Harri Kiesi	(Finland) Marko Ipatti	Mitsubishi Lancer Evo IV	P
46	(Finland) Kaj Kuistila	(Finland) Kari Jokinen	(Finland) Kaj Kuistila	Mitsubishi Lancer Evo VI	—N/a
47	(Argentina) Marcos Ligato	(Argentina) Rubén García	(Argentina) Marcos Ligato	Mitsubishi Lancer Evo VI	—N/a
48	(Finland) Jari Ketomaa	(Finland) Ossi Lehtonen	(Finland) Jari Ketomaa	Subaru Impreza 555	—N/a
49	(Finland) Antti Asunta	(Finland) Tuomo Hannonen	(Finland) Antti Asunta	Mitsubishi Carisma GT Evo VI	—N/a
74	(Finland) Hannu Hotanen	(Finland) Sami Räsänen	(Finland) Hannu Hotanen	Mitsubishi Lancer Evo VI	—N/a
75	(San Marino) Mirco Baldacci	(Italy) Maurizio Barone	(San Marino) Mirco Baldacci	Mitsubishi Lancer Evo VI	P
76	(Finland) Juha Salo	(Finland) Mika Stenberg	(Finland) Juha Salo	Mitsubishi Carisma GT	P
78	(Finland) Ari Laivola	(Finland) Markku Laakso	(Finland) Ari Laivola	Mitsubishi Lancer Evo VI	—N/a
84	(Finland) Jukka Ketomäki	(Finland) Jani Laaksonen	(Finland) Jukka Ketomäki	Mitsubishi Lancer Evo IV	—N/a
85	(Finland) Minna Lindroos	(Finland) Sari Kontro-Silvennoinen	(Finland) Minna Lindroos	Mitsubishi Lancer Evo V	—N/a
86	(Finland) Janne Perälä	(Finland) Mikko Jokinen	(Finland) Janne Perälä	Mitsubishi Lancer Evo VI	—N/a
87	(Finland) Mikko-Pekka Rintamo	(Finland) Tomi Minkkinen	(Finland) Mikko-Pekka Rintamo	Mitsubishi Lancer Evo V	—N/a
88	(Finland) Mika Rantanen	(Finland) Ismo Rajamäki	(Finland) Mika Rantanen	Mitsubishi Lancer Evo V	—N/a
89	(Sweden) Mikael Lindqvist	(Sweden) Mats Lindqvist	(Sweden) Mikael Lindqvist	Mitsubishi Lancer Evo V	—N/a
90	(Spain) Ignacio Sanfilippo	(Spain) Víctor Pérez Rodríguez	(Spain) Ignacio Sanfilippo	Mitsubishi Lancer Evo VI	—N/a
91	(Sweden) Oscar Svedlund	(Sweden) Björn Nilsson	(Sweden) Oscar Svedlund	Mitsubishi Lancer Evo VI	—N/a
92	(Finland) Mats Rinne	(Finland) Timo Rossi	(Finland) Mats Rinne	Mitsubishi Lancer Evo V	—N/a
94	(Finland) Jani Ylipahkala	(Finland) Jyrki Kumpulainen	(Finland) Jani Ylipahkala	Mitsubishi Lancer Evo III	—N/a
95	(Finland) Sakari Kalliomaa	(Finland) Juha Koskinen	(Finland) Sakari Kalliomaa	Mitsubishi Lancer Evo VI	—N/a
96	(Finland) Karri Marttila	(Finland) Janne Runtti	(Finland) Karri Marttila	Mitsubishi Carisma GT	—N/a
97	(Russia) Stanislav Gryazin	(Russia) Dmitriy Eremeev	(Russia) Stanislav Gryazin	Mitsubishi Lancer Evo VI	—N/a
98	(Finland) Patrik Malteskog	(Finland) Mathias Gårdman	(Finland) Patrik Malteskog	Mitsubishi Lancer Evo IV	—N/a
99	(Finland) Juha Häkkinen	(Finland) Kari Hytönen	(Finland) Juha Häkkinen	Mitsubishi Lancer Evo V	—N/a
100	(Lithuania) Saulius Girdauskas	(Lithuania) Žilvinas Sakalauskas	(Lithuania) Saulius Girdauskas	Mitsubishi Lancer Evo IV	—N/a
101	(United Kingdom) Nik Elsmore	(United Kingdom) Jayson Brown	(United Kingdom) Nik Elsmore	Mitsubishi Lancer Evo VI	—N/a
103	(Finland) Jarkko Miettinen	(Finland) Mikko Markkula	(Finland) Jarkko Miettinen	Mitsubishi Lancer Evo III	—N/a
105	(United Kingdom) Ben Briant	(United Kingdom) Tim Line	(United Kingdom) Ben Briant	Mitsubishi Lancer Evo VI	—N/a
107	(Sweden) Thorleif Granlöf	(Sweden) Christer Granlöf	(Sweden) Thorleif Granlöf	Mitsubishi Lancer Evo IV	—N/a
108	(Norway) Bernt Kollevold	(Norway) Ola Fløene	(Norway) Bernt Kollevold	Mitsubishi Lancer Evo VI	—N/a
109	(Sweden) Magnus Jansson	(Sweden) Max Lindqvist	(Sweden) Magnus Jansson	Mitsubishi Lancer Evo IV	—N/a
110	(Norway) Tord Linnerud	(Norway) Leif-Arne Neset	(Norway) Tord Linnerud	Mitsubishi Lancer Evo VI	—N/a
111	(Belgium) Bob Colsoul	(Belgium) Tom Colsoul	(Belgium) Bob Colsoul	Mitsubishi Lancer Evo VI	—N/a
112	(United Kingdom) Natalie Barratt	(United Kingdom) Stella Boyles	(United Kingdom) Natalie Barratt Rallysport	Mitsubishi Lancer Evo VI	—N/a
113	(United Kingdom) Julian Reynolds	(United Kingdom) Ieuan Thomas	(United Kingdom) Julian Reynolds	Mitsubishi Lancer Evo IV	—N/a
119	(Italy) Luca Betti	(Italy) Andrea Gorni	(Italy) Luca Betti	Mitsubishi Lancer Evo V	—N/a
120	(Italy) Riccardo Errani	(Italy) Stefano Casadio	(Italy) Riccardo Errani	Mitsubishi Lancer Evo VI	—N/a
122	(Italy) Luigi Ricci	(Italy) Alberto Guerini	(Italy) Luigi Ricci	Mitsubishi Lancer Evo VI	—N/a
124	(United Kingdom) David Taylor	(United Kingdom) Mark Andrews	(United Kingdom) David Taylor	Mitsubishi Lancer Evo VI	—N/a
125	(United Kingdom) Mark l'Anson	(United Kingdom) Graeme Walker	(United Kingdom) Mark l'Anson	Mitsubishi Lancer Evo VI	—N/a
126	(Russia) Alexey Khanovich	(Russia) Sergey Talantsev	(Russia) Alexey Khanovich	Mitsubishi Lancer Evo VI	—N/a
127	(United Kingdom) Alistair Ginley	(United Kingdom) John Bennie	(United Kingdom) Alistair Ginley	Mitsubishi Lancer Evo VI	—N/a
128	(Finland) Teppo Karttunen	(Finland) Tapio Sarkka	(Finland) Teppo Karttunen	Mitsubishi Lancer Evo IV	—N/a
129	(Italy) Stefano Marrini	(Italy) Tiziana Sandroni	(Italy) Stefano Marrini	Mitsubishi Lancer Evo VI	—N/a
130	(Italy) Pierluigi Alessandri	(Italy) Christina Castiglioni	(Italy) Pierluigi Alessandri	Mitsubishi Lancer Evo VI	—N/a
131	(Japan) Wakujiro Kobayashi	(Japan) Kohei Kusaka	(Japan) Wakujiro Kobayashi	Mitsubishi Lancer Evo VII	—N/a
132	(Finland) Jaakko Rytsölä	(Finland) Kari Kajula	(Finland) AIM Motorsport OY	Mitsubishi Lancer Evo V	—N/a
135	(Finland) Ilkka Kärpänen	(Finland) Jukka Aromaa	(Finland) Ilkka Kärpänen	Opel Astra GSi 16V	—N/a
136	(Finland) Juha Sipilä	(Finland) Juha Lummaa	(Finland) Juha Sipilä	Opel Astra GSi 16V	—N/a
137	(Finland) Rami Räikkönen	(Finland) Juha Rapala	(Finland) Rami Räikkönen	Honda Integra Type-R	—N/a
138	(Finland) Erno Randelin	(Finland) Juha-Pekka Kauppinen	(Finland) Erno Randelin	Opel Astra GSi 16V	—N/a
139	(Finland) Marko Nieminen	(Finland) Jarkko Torniainen	(Finland) Marko Nieminen	Opel Astra GSi 16V	—N/a
140	(Finland) Harri Korkiakoski	(Finland) Jorma Kiimalainen	(Finland) Harri Korkiakoski	Opel Astra GSi 16V	—N/a
141	(Finland) Petri Uronen	(Finland) Jan Lillman	(Finland) Petri Uronen	Honda Integra Type-R	—N/a
142	(Sweden) Stefan Jonsson	(Sweden) Bertil Godén	(Sweden) Stefan Jonsson	Peugeot 306 GTI	—N/a
143	(Finland) Mika Kosunen	(Finland) Timo Väätainen	(Finland) Mika Kosunen	Opel Astra GSi 16V	—N/a
144	(Finland) Markku Markkanen	(Finland) Kim Lehtola	(Finland) Markku Markkanen	Honda Integra Type-R	—N/a
145	(Norway) Tommy Slåstad	(Norway) Rune Haraldsen	(Norway) Tommy Slåstad	Opel Astra OPC	—N/a
146	(France) Eddie Mercier	(France) Jean-Michel Veret	(France) Eddie Mercier	Renault Clio RS	—N/a
147	(Austria) Wolfram Doberer	(Austria) Bettina Wessely	(Austria) Wolfram Doberer	Renault Clio Sport	—N/a
148	(Finland) Harri Jaakonsaari	(Finland) Timo Heino	(Finland) Harri Jaakonsaari	Peugeot 306 S16	—N/a
149	(Finland) Markku Harju	(Finland) Pekka Leppälä	(Finland) Markku Harju	Ford Escort RS 2000	—N/a
150	(Finland) Kosti Katajamäki	(Finland) Lasse Hirvijärvi	(Finland) Kosti Katajamäki	Volkswagen Polo GTi	—N/a
151	(Finland) Juha Koskinen	(Finland) Harri Virtanen	(Finland) Juha Koskinen	Ford Escort RS 2000	—N/a
152	(Finland) Timo Hietikko	(Finland) Teemu Honkonen	(Finland) Timo Hietikko	Ford Escort RS 2000	—N/a
153	(Finland) Jyrki Salminen	(Finland) Mia Miettinen	(Finland) RallyRent Europe	Mitsubishi Lancer Evo VI	—N/a
154	(Italy) Roberto Maculan	(Italy) Maurizio Ruaro	(Italy) Roberto Maculan	Seat Ibiza TDI	—N/a
155	(Italy) Andrea Farmakakis	(Italy) Marco Marco Di	(Italy) Andrea Farmakakis	Seat Ibiza TDI	—N/a
157	(Republic of Ireland) Michael Murray	(Republic of Ireland) Jakes Kelly	(Republic of Ireland) Michael Murray	Honda Integra Type-R	—N/a
158	(France) Jean-Louis Chanet	(France) Daniel Grappin	(France) Jean-Louis Chanet	Renault Clio Williams	—N/a
159	(United Kingdom) Carl Poscha	(United Kingdom) Ray Hotty	(United Kingdom) Carl Poscha	Citroën Saxo VTS	—N/a
167	(Finland) Jorma Laakso	(Finland) Pentti Puranen	(Finland) Jorma Laakso	Volkswagen Polo 16V	—N/a
168	(Finland) Lasse Laine	(Finland) Jouni Laine	(Finland) Lasse Laine	Suzuki Swift GTi	—N/a
169	(Finland) Juhani Länsikorpi	(Finland) Jorma Hakanen	(Finland) Juhani Länsikorpi	Volkswagen Polo 16V	—N/a
170	(Finland) Mika Kitola	(Finland) Pentti Tiainen	(Finland) Mika Kitola	Peugeot 106 Rallye	—N/a
171	(Finland) Matti J. Tarvainen	(Finland) Rauno Hurskainen	(Finland) Matti J. Tarvainen	Škoda Favorit 136 L	—N/a
Super 1600 Cup entries
50	(Austria) Manfred Stohl	(Austria) Peter Müller	(Italy) Top Run SRL	Fiat Punto S1600	—N/a
51	(France) Patrick Magaud	(France) Guylène Brun	(United Kingdom) Ford Motor Co. Ltd.	Ford Puma S1600	—N/a
52	(Italy) Andrea Dallavilla	(Italy) Giovanni Bernacchini	(Italy) R&D Motorsport	Fiat Punto S1600	—N/a
53	(France) Sébastien Loeb	(Monaco) Daniel Elena	(France) Citroën Sport	Citroën Saxo S1600	MI
54	(Belgium) Larry Cols	(Belgium) Yasmine Gerard	(Belgium) Peugeot Bastos Racing	Peugeot 206 S1600	—N/a
55	(United Kingdom) Niall McShea	(United Kingdom) Michael Orr	(France) Citroën Sport	Citroën Saxo S1600	—N/a
56	(Italy) Giandomenico Basso	(Italy) Flavio Guglielmini	(Italy) Top Run SRL	Fiat Punto S1600	—N/a
57	(France) Cédric Robert	(France) Marie-Pierre Billoux	(France) Team Gamma	Peugeot 206 S1600	—N/a
58	(Spain) Sergio Vallejo	(Spain) Diego Vallejo	(Spain) Pronto Racing	Fiat Punto S1600	MI
59	(France) Benoît Rousselot	(France) Gilles Mondésir	(United Kingdom) Ford Motor Co. Ltd.	Ford Puma S1600	—N/a
61	(Italy) Corrado Fontana	(Italy) Renzo Casazza	(Italy) H.F. Grifone SRL	Peugeot 206 S1600	—N/a
62	(Finland) Jussi Välimäki	(Finland) Jakke Honkanen	(Finland) ST Motors	Peugeot 206 S1600	—N/a
63	(Norway) Martin Stenshorne	(United Kingdom) Clive Jenkins	(Norway) Zeta Racing	Ford Puma S1600	—N/a
64	(Italy) Massimo Macaluso	(Italy) Antonio Celot	(Italy) R&D Motorsport	Fiat Punto S1600	—N/a
65	(Paraguay) Alejandro Galanti	(Paraguay) Fernando Zuleta	(Italy) Astra Racing	Ford Puma S1600	—N/a
67	(Andorra) Albert Llovera	(Spain) Marc Corral	(Spain) Pronto Racing	Fiat Punto S1600	MI
68	(Italy) Massimo Ceccato	(Italy) Mitia Dotta	(Italy) Hawk Racing Club	Fiat Punto S1600	—N/a
69	(France) Nicolas Bernardi	(France) Jean-Claude Grau	(France) Team Gamma	Peugeot 206 S1600	—N/a
71	(Belgium) François Duval	(Belgium) Jean-Marc Fortin	(United Kingdom) Ford Motor Co. Ltd.	Ford Puma S1600	—N/a
72	(Malaysia) Saladin Mazlan	(United Kingdom) Timothy Sturla	(Malaysia) Saladin Rallying	Ford Puma S1600	—N/a
73	(Italy) Christian Chemin	(Italy) Matteo Alberto Bacchin	(Italy) Hawk Racing Club	Fiat Punto S1600	—N/a

=== Itinerary ===
All dates and times are EEST (UTC+3).

Date	Time	No.	Stage name	Distance
Leg 1 — 129.49 km
24 August	09:43	SS1	Valkola 1	8.42 km
24 August	10:26	SS2	Lankamaa 1	23.47 km
24 August	11:19	SS3	Laukaa 1	12.40 km
24 August	13:25	SS4	Mökkiperä	13.38 km
24 August	14:06	SS5	Palsankylä	25.47 km
24 August	16:56	SS6	Valkola 2	8.42 km
24 August	17:39	SS7	Lankamaa 2	23.47 km
24 August	18:32	SS8	Laukaa 2	12.40 km
24 August	20:00	SS9	SSS Killeri 1	2.06 km
Leg 2 — 180.55 km
25 August	08:03	SS10	Talviainen 1	30.30 km
25 August	09:16	SS11	Västilä	17.40 km
25 August	09:51	SS12	Päijälä	12.81 km
25 August	11:58	SS13	Ehikki	19.07 km
25 August	12:36	SS14	Parkkola	15.80 km
25 August	13:14	SS15	Leustu	23.58 km
25 August	15:32	SS16	Ouninpohja 1	34.11 km
25 August	16:35	SS17	Vaheri	25.42 km
25 August	20:15	SS18	SSS Killeri 2	2.06 km
Leg 3 — 96.34 km
26 August	09:53	SS19	Moksi — Leustu	40.84 km
26 August	12:11	SS20	Talviainen 2	30.30 km
26 August	13:39	SS21	Ouninpohja 2	25.20 km

== Results ==
=== Overall ===
Pos.	No.	Driver	Co-driver	Team	Car	Time	Difference	Points
1	1	(Finland) Marcus Grönholm	(Finland) Timo Rautiainen	(France) Peugeot Total	Peugeot 206 WRC	3:23:12.8		10
2	5	(United Kingdom) Richard Burns	(United Kingdom) Robert Reid	(Japan) Subaru World Rally Team	Subaru Impreza S7 WRC '01	3:23:37.8	+25.0	6
3	4	(United Kingdom) Colin McRae	(United Kingdom) Nicky Grist	(United Kingdom) Ford Motor Co. Ltd.	Ford Focus RS WRC '01	3:23:45.1	+32.3	4
4	16	(Finland) Harri Rovanperä	(Finland) Risto Pietiläinen	(France) Peugeot Total	Peugeot 206 WRC	3:23:46.7	+33.9	3
5	18	(Estonia) Markko Märtin	(United Kingdom) Michael Park	(Japan) Subaru World Rally Team	Subaru Impreza S7 WRC '01	3:24:30.7	+1:17.9	2
6	3	(Spain) Carlos Sainz	(Spain) Luis Moya	(United Kingdom) Ford Motor Co. Ltd.	Ford Focus RS WRC '01	3:24:53.3	+1:40.5	1

=== World Rally Cars ===
==== Classification ====
Position		No.	Driver	Co-driver	Entrant	Car	Time	Difference	Points
Event	Class	No.	Driver	Co-driver	Entrant	Car	Time	Difference	Points
1	1	1	(Finland) Marcus Grönholm	(Finland) Timo Rautiainen	(France) Peugeot Total	Peugeot 206 WRC	3:23:12.8		10
2	2	5	(United Kingdom) Richard Burns	(United Kingdom) Robert Reid	(Japan) Subaru World Rally Team	Subaru Impreza S7 WRC '01	3:23:37.8	+25.0	6
3	3	4	(United Kingdom) Colin McRae	(United Kingdom) Nicky Grist	(United Kingdom) Ford Motor Co. Ltd.	Ford Focus RS WRC '01	3:23:45.1	+32.3	4
4	4	16	(Finland) Harri Rovanperä	(Finland) Risto Pietiläinen	(France) Peugeot Total	Peugeot 206 WRC	3:23:46.7	+33.9	3
6	5	3	(Spain) Carlos Sainz	(Spain) Luis Moya	(United Kingdom) Ford Motor Co. Ltd.	Ford Focus RS WRC '01	3:24:53.3	+1:40.5	1
7	6	6	(Norway) Petter Solberg	(United Kingdom) Phil Mills	(Japan) Subaru World Rally Team	Subaru Impreza S7 WRC '01	3:25:52.4	+2:39.6	0
12	7	9	(Sweden) Kenneth Eriksson	(Sweden) Staffan Parmander	(South Korea) Hyundai Castrol World Rally Team	Hyundai Accent WRC2	3:29:59.2	+6:46.4	0
15	8	11	(Germany) Armin Schwarz	(Germany) Manfred Hiemer	(Czech Republic) Škoda Motorsport	Škoda Octavia WRC Evo2	3:32:15.0	+9:02.2	0
18	9	12	(Belgium) Bruno Thiry	(Belgium) Georges Biar	(Czech Republic) Škoda Motorsport	Škoda Octavia WRC Evo2	3:35:12.6	+11:59.8	0
Retired SS21		19	(Finland) Toni Gardemeister	(Finland) Paavo Lukander	(Japan) Marlboro Mitsubishi Ralliart	Mitsubishi Carisma GT Evo VI	Accident		0
Retired SS16		20	(Finland) Juha Kankkunen	(Finland) Juha Repo	(South Korea) Hyundai Castrol World Rally Team	Hyundai Accent WRC2	Mechanical		0
Retired SS1		7	(Finland) Tommi Mäkinen	(Finland) Risto Mannisenmäki	(Japan) Marlboro Mitsubishi Ralliart	Mitsubishi Lancer Evo 6.5	Suspension		0

==== Special stages ====
Day	Stage	Stage name	Length	Winner	Car	Time	Class leaders
Leg 1 (24 Aug)	SS1	Valkola 1	8.42 km	(Finland) Harri Rovanperä	Peugeot 206 WRC	4:27.2	(Finland) Harri Rovanperä
Leg 1 (24 Aug)	SS2	Lankamaa 1	23.47 km	(Finland) Marcus Grönholm	Peugeot 206 WRC	11:33.5	(Finland) Harri Rovanperä
Leg 1 (24 Aug)	SS3	Laukaa 1	12.40 km	(Finland) Marcus Grönholm	Peugeot 206 WRC	6:06.6	(Finland) Marcus Grönholm
Leg 1 (24 Aug)	SS4	Mökkiperä	13.38 km	(United Kingdom) Richard Burns	Subaru Impreza S7 WRC '01	6:26.8	(Finland) Marcus Grönholm
Leg 1 (24 Aug)	SS5	Palsankylä	25.47 km	(Finland) Marcus Grönholm	Peugeot 206 WRC	13:48.7	(Finland) Marcus Grönholm
Leg 1 (24 Aug)	SS6	Valkola 2	8.42 km	(Finland) Marcus Grönholm	Peugeot 206 WRC	4:27.4	(Finland) Marcus Grönholm
Leg 1 (24 Aug)	SS7	Lankamaa 2	23.47 km	(United Kingdom) Richard Burns	Subaru Impreza S7 WRC '01	11:35.4	(Finland) Marcus Grönholm
Leg 1 (24 Aug)	SS8	Laukaa 2	12.40 km	(Estonia) Markko Märtin	Subaru Impreza S7 WRC '01	6:06.0	(United Kingdom) Richard Burns
Leg 1 (24 Aug)	SS9	SSS Killeri 1	2.06 km	(Spain) Carlos Sainz	Ford Focus RS WRC '01	1:21.2	(United Kingdom) Richard Burns
Leg 2 (25 Aug)	SS10	Talviainen 1	30.30 km	(Finland) Marcus Grönholm	Peugeot 206 WRC	15:06.2	(Finland) Marcus Grönholm
Leg 2 (25 Aug)	SS11	Västilä	17.40 km	(Finland) Harri Rovanperä	Peugeot 206 WRC	8:22.4	(Finland) Marcus Grönholm
Leg 2 (25 Aug)	SS12	Päijälä	12.81 km	(Spain) Carlos Sainz	Ford Focus RS WRC '01	6:01.9	(Finland) Marcus Grönholm
Leg 2 (25 Aug)	SS13	Ehikki	19.07 km	(Finland) Harri Rovanperä	Peugeot 206 WRC	9:18.5	(Finland) Marcus Grönholm
Leg 2 (25 Aug)	SS14	Parkkola	15.80 km	(United Kingdom) Colin McRae	Ford Focus RS WRC '01	8:03.6	(Finland) Marcus Grönholm
Leg 2 (25 Aug)	SS15	Leustu	23.58 km	(Finland) Harri Rovanperä	Peugeot 206 WRC	11:38.3	(Finland) Marcus Grönholm
Leg 2 (25 Aug)	SS16	Ouninpohja 1	34.11 km	(Finland) Harri Rovanperä	Peugeot 206 WRC	16:29.9	(Finland) Marcus Grönholm
Leg 2 (25 Aug)	SS17	Vaheri	25.42 km	(United Kingdom) Colin McRae	Ford Focus RS WRC '01	12:20.6	(Finland) Marcus Grönholm
Leg 2 (25 Aug)	SS18	SSS Killeri 2	2.06 km	(Finland) Marcus Grönholm	Peugeot 206 WRC	1:20.3	(Finland) Marcus Grönholm
Leg 3 (26 Aug)	SS19	Moksi — Leustu	40.84 km	(United Kingdom) Richard Burns	Subaru Impreza S7 WRC '01	20:52.2	(Finland) Marcus Grönholm
Leg 3 (26 Aug)	SS20	Talviainen 2	30.30 km	(Finland) Harri Rovanperä	Peugeot 206 WRC	14:53.6	(Finland) Marcus Grönholm
Leg 3 (26 Aug)	SS21	Ouninpohja 2	25.20 km	(United Kingdom) Richard Burns	Subaru Impreza S7 WRC '01	11:43.6	(Finland) Marcus Grönholm

==== Championship standings ====
Pos.	Drivers' championships			Co-drivers' championships			Manufacturers' championships		
Pos.	Move	Driver	Points	Move	Co-driver	Points	Move	Manufacturer	Points
1		(Finland) Tommi Mäkinen	40		(Finland) Risto Mannisenmäki	40		(Japan) Marlboro Mitsubishi Ralliart	66
2		(United Kingdom) Colin McRae	34		(United Kingdom) Nicky Grist	34		(United Kingdom) Ford Motor Co. Ltd.	66
3		(Spain) Carlos Sainz	27		(Spain) Luis Moya	27	1	(France) Peugeot Total	39
4		(Finland) Harri Rovanperä	23		(Finland) Risto Pietiläinen	23	1	(Japan) Subaru World Rally Team	35
5		(United Kingdom) Richard Burns	21		(United Kingdom) Robert Reid	21		(Czech Republic) Škoda Motorsport	15

=== FIA Cup for Production Rally Drivers ===
==== Classification ====
Position		No.	Driver	Co-driver	Entrant	Car	Time	Difference	Points
Event	Class	No.	Driver	Co-driver	Entrant	Car	Time	Difference	Points
25	1	47	(Argentina) Marcos Ligato	(Argentina) Rubén García	(Argentina) Marcos Ligato	Mitsubishi Lancer Evo VI	3:44:36.2		10
26	2	40	(Argentina) Gabriel Pozzo	(Argentina) Daniel Stillo	(Argentina) Gabriel Pozzo	Mitsubishi Lancer Evo VI	3:45:25.6	+49.4	6
27	3	46	(Finland) Kaj Kuistila	(Finland) Kari Jokinen	(Finland) Kaj Kuistila	Mitsubishi Lancer Evo VI	3:45:59.8	+1:23.6	4
29	4	48	(Finland) Jari Ketomaa	(Finland) Ossi Lehtonen	(Finland) Jari Ketomaa	Subaru Impreza 555	3:49:59.5	+5:23.3	3
30	5	78	(Finland) Ari Laivola	(Finland) Markku Laakso	(Finland) Ari Laivola	Mitsubishi Lancer Evo VI	3:50:29.3	+5:53.1	2
31	6	90	(Spain) Ignacio Sanfilippo	(Spain) Víctor Pérez Rodríguez	(Spain) Ignacio Sanfilippo	Mitsubishi Lancer Evo VI	3:51:56.4	+7:20.2	1
32	7	95	(Finland) Sakari Kalliomaa	(Finland) Juha Koskinen	(Finland) Sakari Kalliomaa	Mitsubishi Lancer Evo VI	3:52:19.1	+7:42.9	0
33	8	92	(Finland) Mats Rinne	(Finland) Timo Rossi	(Finland) Mats Rinne	Mitsubishi Lancer Evo V	3:54:28.5	+9:52.3	0
35	9	98	(Finland) Patrik Malteskog	(Finland) Mathias Gårdman	(Finland) Patrik Malteskog	Mitsubishi Lancer Evo IV	3:56:28.2	+11:52.0	0
37	10	110	(Norway) Tord Linnerud	(Norway) Leif-Arne Neset	(Norway) Tord Linnerud	Mitsubishi Lancer Evo VI	3:58:13.9	+13:37.7	0
38	11	91	(Sweden) Oscar Svedlund	(Sweden) Björn Nilsson	(Sweden) Oscar Svedlund	Mitsubishi Lancer Evo VI	3:58:44.0	+14:07.8	0
40	12	101	(United Kingdom) Nik Elsmore	(United Kingdom) Jayson Brown	(United Kingdom) Nik Elsmore	Mitsubishi Lancer Evo VI	3:59:32.8	+14:56.6	0
41	13	127	(United Kingdom) Alistair Ginley	(United Kingdom) John Bennie	(United Kingdom) Alistair Ginley	Mitsubishi Lancer Evo VI	4:02:18.5	+17:42.3	0
42	14	108	(Norway) Bernt Kollevold	(Norway) Ola Fløene	(Norway) Bernt Kollevold	Mitsubishi Lancer Evo VI	4:03:47.8	+19:11.6	0
45	15	75	(San Marino) Mirco Baldacci	(Italy) Maurizio Barone	(San Marino) Mirco Baldacci	Mitsubishi Lancer Evo VI	4:06:08.8	+21:32.6	0
46	16	144	(Finland) Markku Markkanen	(Finland) Kim Lehtola	(Finland) Markku Markkanen	Honda Integra Type-R	4:09:53.7	+25:17.5	0
47	17	139	(Finland) Marko Nieminen	(Finland) Jarkko Torniainen	(Finland) Marko Nieminen	Opel Astra GSi 16V	4:10:48.4	+26:12.2	0
49	18	105	(United Kingdom) Ben Briant	(United Kingdom) Tim Line	(United Kingdom) Ben Briant	Mitsubishi Lancer Evo VI	4:11:38.0	+27:01.8	0
52	19	109	(Sweden) Magnus Jansson	(Sweden) Max Lindqvist	(Sweden) Magnus Jansson	Mitsubishi Lancer Evo IV	4:12:45.6	+28:09.4	0
53	20	150	(Finland) Kosti Katajamäki	(Finland) Lasse Hirvijärvi	(Finland) Kosti Katajamäki	Volkswagen Polo GTi	4:12:52.2	+28:16.0	0
54	21	143	(Finland) Mika Kosunen	(Finland) Timo Väätainen	(Finland) Mika Kosunen	Opel Astra GSi 16V	4:15:37.6	+31:01.4	0
55	22	151	(Finland) Juha Koskinen	(Finland) Harri Virtanen	(Finland) Juha Koskinen	Ford Escort RS 2000	4:15:37.9	+31:01.7	0
56	23	146	(France) Eddie Mercier	(France) Jean-Michel Veret	(France) Eddie Mercier	Renault Clio RS	4:19:09.3	+34:33.1	0
57	24	112	(United Kingdom) Natalie Barratt	(United Kingdom) Stella Boyles	(United Kingdom) Natalie Barratt Rallysport	Mitsubishi Lancer Evo VI	4:19:45.0	+35:08.8	0
62	25	149	(Finland) Markku Harju	(Finland) Pekka Leppälä	(Finland) Markku Harju	Ford Escort RS 2000	4:26:38.3	+42:02.1	0
63	26	120	(Italy) Riccardo Errani	(Italy) Stefano Casadio	(Italy) Riccardo Errani	Mitsubishi Lancer Evo VI	4:32:26.8	+47:50.6	0
64	27	124	(United Kingdom) David Taylor	(United Kingdom) Mark Andrews	(United Kingdom) David Taylor	Mitsubishi Lancer Evo VI	4:32:57.5	+48:21.3	0
65	28	168	(Finland) Lasse Laine	(Finland) Jouni Laine	(Finland) Lasse Laine	Suzuki Swift GTi	4:36:34.3	+51:58.1	0
66	29	153	(Finland) Jyrki Salminen	(Finland) Mia Miettinen	(Finland) RallyRent Europe	Mitsubishi Lancer Evo VI	4:37:16.6	+52:40.4	0
68	30	148	(Finland) Harri Jaakonsaari	(Finland) Timo Heino	(Finland) Harri Jaakonsaari	Peugeot 306 S16	4:39:26.8	+54:50.6	0
71	31	155	(Italy) Andrea Farmakakis	(Italy) Marco Marco Di	(Italy) Andrea Farmakakis	Seat Ibiza TDI	4:46:36.4	+1:02:00.2	0
73	32	157	(Republic of Ireland) Michael Murray	(Republic of Ireland) Jakes Kelly	(Republic of Ireland) Michael Murray	Honda Integra Type-R	4:47:02.6	+1:02:26.4	0
74	33	158	(France) Jean-Louis Chanet	(France) Daniel Grappin	(France) Jean-Louis Chanet	Renault Clio Williams	4:47:41.3	+1:03:05.1	0
75	34	170	(Finland) Mika Kitola	(Finland) Pentti Tiainen	(Finland) Mika Kitola	Peugeot 106 Rallye	4:52:13.2	+1:07:37.0	0
76	35	169	(Finland) Juhani Länsikorpi	(Finland) Jorma Hakanen	(Finland) Juhani Länsikorpi	Volkswagen Polo 16V	4:56:29.9	+1:11:53.7	0
77	36	154	(Italy) Roberto Maculan	(Italy) Maurizio Ruaro	(Italy) Roberto Maculan	Seat Ibiza TDI	4:58:13.9	+1:13:37.7	0
Retired SS20		103	(Finland) Jarkko Miettinen	(Finland) Mikko Markkula	(Finland) Jarkko Miettinen	Mitsubishi Lancer Evo III	Mechanical		0
Retired SS20		111	(Belgium) Bob Colsoul	(Belgium) Tom Colsoul	(Belgium) Bob Colsoul	Mitsubishi Lancer Evo VI	Accident		0
Retired SS19		38	(Finland) Jouko Puhakka	(Finland) Keijo Eerola	Mitsubishi Ralliart Finland	Mitsubishi Carisma GT	Oil pressure		0
Retired SS19		39	(Finland) Jouni Ampuja	(Finland) Jarmo Lehtinen	(Finland) Jouni Ampuja	Mitsubishi Carisma GT Evo VI	Suspension		0
Retired SS19		45	(Finland) Marko Ipatti	(Finland) Harri Kiesi	(Finland) Marko Ipatti	Mitsubishi Lancer Evo IV	Accident		0
Retired SS19		76	(Finland) Juha Salo	(Finland) Mika Stenberg	(Finland) Juha Salo	Mitsubishi Carisma GT	Mechanical		0
Retired SS19		86	(Finland) Janne Perälä	(Finland) Mikko Jokinen	(Finland) Janne Perälä	Mitsubishi Lancer Evo VI	Accident		0
Retired SS19		87	(Finland) Mikko-Pekka Rintamo	(Finland) Tomi Minkkinen	(Finland) Mikko-Pekka Rintamo	Mitsubishi Lancer Evo V	Mechanical		0
Retired SS19		119	(Italy) Luca Betti	(Italy) Andrea Gorni	(Italy) Luca Betti	Mitsubishi Lancer Evo V	Retired		0
Retired SS19		130	(Italy) Pierluigi Alessandri	(Italy) Christina Castiglioni	(Italy) Pierluigi Alessandri	Mitsubishi Lancer Evo VI	Mechanical		0
Retired SS19		136	(Finland) Juha Sipilä	(Finland) Juha Lummaa	(Finland) Juha Sipilä	Opel Astra GSi 16V	Mechanical		0
Retired SS18		42	(Finland) Kristian Sohlberg	(Finland) Jukka Aho	(Finland) Kristian Sohlberg	Mitsubishi Carisma GT	Mechanical		0
Retired SS17		97	(Russia) Stanislav Gryazin	(Russia) Dmitriy Eremeev	(Russia) Stanislav Gryazin	Mitsubishi Lancer Evo VI	Accident		0
Retired SS17		138	(Finland) Erno Randelin	(Finland) Juha-Pekka Kauppinen	(Finland) Erno Randelin	Opel Astra GSi 16V	Electrical		0
Retired SS16		74	(Finland) Hannu Hotanen	(Finland) Sami Räsänen	(Finland) Hannu Hotanen	Mitsubishi Lancer Evo VI	Mechanical		0
Retired SS16		85	(Finland) Minna Lindroos	(Finland) Sari Kontro-Silvennoinen	(Finland) Minna Lindroos	Mitsubishi Lancer Evo V	Accident		0
Retired SS16		100	(Lithuania) Saulius Girdauskas	(Lithuania) Žilvinas Sakalauskas	(Lithuania) Saulius Girdauskas	Mitsubishi Lancer Evo IV	Engine		0
Retired SS16		132	(Finland) Jaakko Rytsölä	(Finland) Kari Kajula	(Finland) AIM Motorsport OY	Mitsubishi Lancer Evo V	Accident		0
Retired SS16		137	(Finland) Rami Räikkönen	(Finland) Juha Rapala	(Finland) Rami Räikkönen	Honda Integra Type-R	Electrical		0
Retired SS16		140	(Finland) Harri Korkiakoski	(Finland) Jorma Kiimalainen	(Finland) Harri Korkiakoski	Opel Astra GSi 16V	Suspension		0
Retired SS15		88	(Finland) Mika Rantanen	(Finland) Ismo Rajamäki	(Finland) Mika Rantanen	Mitsubishi Lancer Evo V	Brakes		0
Retired SS15		152	(Finland) Timo Hietikko	(Finland) Teemu Honkonen	(Finland) Timo Hietikko	Ford Escort RS 2000	Fuel pump		0
Retired SS15		171	(Finland) Matti J. Tarvainen	(Finland) Rauno Hurskainen	(Finland) Matti J. Tarvainen	Škoda Favorit 136 L	Engine		0
Retired SS14		48	(Finland) Jari Ketomaa	(Finland) Ossi Lehtonen	(Finland) Jari Ketomaa	Subaru Impreza 555	Accident		0
Retired SS14		89	(Sweden) Mikael Lindqvist	(Sweden) Mats Lindqvist	(Sweden) Mikael Lindqvist	Mitsubishi Lancer Evo V	Mechanical		0
Retired SS13		126	(Russia) Alexey Khanovich	(Russia) Sergey Talantsev	(Russia) Alexey Khanovich	Mitsubishi Lancer Evo VI	Mechanical		0
Retired SS11		107	(Sweden) Thorleif Granlöf	(Sweden) Christer Granlöf	(Sweden) Thorleif Granlöf	Mitsubishi Lancer Evo IV	Accident		0
Retired SS10		125	(United Kingdom) Mark l'Anson	(United Kingdom) Graeme Walker	(United Kingdom) Mark l'Anson	Mitsubishi Lancer Evo VI	Differential		0
Retired SS10		135	(Finland) Ilkka Kärpänen	(Finland) Jukka Aromaa	(Finland) Ilkka Kärpänen	Opel Astra GSi 16V	Mechanical		0
Retired SS10		141	(Finland) Petri Uronen	(Finland) Jan Lillman	(Finland) Petri Uronen	Honda Integra Type-R	Differential		0
Retired SS10		167	(Finland) Jorma Laakso	(Finland) Pentti Puranen	(Finland) Jorma Laakso	Volkswagen Polo 16V	Gearbox		0
Retired SS7		44	(Sweden) Kenneth Bäcklund	(Sweden) Tord Andersson	(Sweden) Kenneth Bäcklund	Mitsubishi Lancer Evo VI	Mechanical		0
Retired SS7		94	(Finland) Jani Ylipahkala	(Finland) Jyrki Kumpulainen	(Finland) Jani Ylipahkala	Mitsubishi Lancer Evo III	Mechanical		0
Retired SS7		96	(Finland) Karri Marttila	(Finland) Janne Runtti	(Finland) Karri Marttila	Mitsubishi Carisma GT	Suspension		0
Retired SS7		122	(Italy) Luigi Ricci	(Italy) Alberto Guerini	(Italy) Luigi Ricci	Mitsubishi Lancer Evo VI	Mechanical		0
Retired SS7		128	(Finland) Teppo Karttunen	(Finland) Tapio Sarkka	(Finland) Teppo Karttunen	Mitsubishi Lancer Evo IV	Mechanical		0
Retired SS7		145	(Norway) Tommy Slåstad	(Norway) Rune Haraldsen	(Norway) Tommy Slåstad	Opel Astra OPC	Accident		0
Retired SS6		129	(Italy) Stefano Marrini	(Italy) Tiziana Sandroni	(Italy) Stefano Marrini	Mitsubishi Lancer Evo VI	Mechanical		0
Retired SS5		131	(Japan) Wakujiro Kobayashi	(Japan) Kohei Kusaka	(Japan) Wakujiro Kobayashi	Mitsubishi Lancer Evo VII	Accident		0
Retired SS5		147	(Austria) Wolfram Doberer	(Austria) Bettina Wessely	(Austria) Wolfram Doberer	Renault Clio Sport	Mechanical		0
Retired SS5		159	(United Kingdom) Carl Poscha	(United Kingdom) Ray Hotty	(United Kingdom) Carl Poscha	Citroën Saxo VTS	Accident		0
Retired SS3		99	(Finland) Juha Häkkinen	(Finland) Kari Hytönen	(Finland) Juha Häkkinen	Mitsubishi Lancer Evo V	No fuel		0
Retired SS3		142	(Sweden) Stefan Jonsson	(Sweden) Bertil Godén	(Sweden) Stefan Jonsson	Peugeot 306 GTI	Driveshaft		0
Retired SS2		43	(Italy) Gianluigi Galli	(Italy) Rudy Pollet	(Italy) Gianluigi Galli	Mitsubishi Lancer Evo VI	Mechanical		0
Retired SS2		113	(United Kingdom) Julian Reynolds	(United Kingdom) Ieuan Thomas	(United Kingdom) Julian Reynolds	Mitsubishi Lancer Evo IV	Mechanical		0
Retired SS1		49	(Finland) Antti Asunta	(Finland) Tuomo Hannonen	(Finland) Antti Asunta	Mitsubishi Carisma GT Evo VI	Accident		0

==== Special stages ====
Day	Stage	Stage name	Length	Winner	Car	Time	Class leaders
Leg 1 (24 Aug)	SS1	Valkola 1	8.42 km	(Finland) Jouko Puhakka	Mitsubishi Carisma GT	4:46.6	(Finland) Jouko Puhakka
Leg 1 (24 Aug)	SS2	Lankamaa 1	23.47 km	(Finland) Jouko Puhakka	Mitsubishi Carisma GT	12:17.4	(Finland) Jouko Puhakka
Leg 1 (24 Aug)	SS3	Laukaa 1	12.40 km	(Finland) Juha Salo	Mitsubishi Carisma GT	6:32.8	(Finland) Jouko Puhakka
Leg 1 (24 Aug)	SS4	Mökkiperä	13.38 km	(Finland) Jouko Puhakka	Mitsubishi Carisma GT	6:55.6	(Finland) Jouko Puhakka
Leg 1 (24 Aug)	SS5	Palsankylä	25.47 km	(Finland) Jouko Puhakka	Mitsubishi Carisma GT	14:47.0	(Finland) Jouko Puhakka
Leg 1 (24 Aug)	SS6	Valkola 2	8.42 km	(Finland) Marko Ipatti	Mitsubishi Lancer Evo IV	4:53.2	(Finland) Jouko Puhakka
Leg 1 (24 Aug)	SS7	Lankamaa 2	23.47 km	(Finland) Marko Ipatti	Mitsubishi Lancer Evo IV	12:37.3	(Finland) Jouko Puhakka
Leg 1 (24 Aug)	SS8	Laukaa 2	12.40 km	(Finland) Juha Salo	Mitsubishi Carisma GT	6:32.2	(Finland) Jouko Puhakka
Leg 1 (24 Aug)	SS9	SSS Killeri 1	2.06 km	(Argentina) Gabriel Pozzo (Finland) Marko Ipatti	Mitsubishi Lancer Evo VI; Mitsubishi Lancer Evo IV	1:25.8	(Finland) Jouko Puhakka
Leg 2 (25 Aug)	SS10	Talviainen 1	30.30 km	(Finland) Kristian Sohlberg	Mitsubishi Carisma GT	16:04.1	(Finland) Jouko Puhakka
Leg 2 (25 Aug)	SS11	Västilä	17.40 km	(Finland) Kristian Sohlberg	Mitsubishi Carisma GT	8:52.9	(Finland) Juha Salo
Leg 2 (25 Aug)	SS12	Päijälä	12.81 km	(Finland) Kristian Sohlberg	Mitsubishi Carisma GT	6:18.1	(Finland) Jouni Ampuja
Leg 2 (25 Aug)	SS13	Ehikki	19.07 km	(Finland) Jouko Puhakka	Mitsubishi Carisma GT	9:59.9	(Finland) Jouni Ampuja
Leg 2 (25 Aug)	SS14	Parkkola	15.80 km	(Finland) Jouko Puhakka	Mitsubishi Carisma GT	8:34.0	(Finland) Jouni Ampuja
Leg 2 (25 Aug)	SS15	Leustu	23.58 km	(Finland) Jouko Puhakka	Mitsubishi Carisma GT	12:36.5	(Finland) Jouni Ampuja
Leg 2 (25 Aug)	SS16	Ouninpohja 1	34.11 km	(Finland) Kristian Sohlberg	Mitsubishi Carisma GT	17:23.9	(Finland) Jouni Ampuja
Leg 2 (25 Aug)	SS17	Vaheri	25.42 km	(Finland) Jouko Puhakka	Mitsubishi Carisma GT	13:09.2	(Finland) Jouni Ampuja
Leg 2 (25 Aug)	SS18	SSS Killeri 2	2.06 km	(Argentina) Marcos Ligato	Mitsubishi Lancer Evo VI	1:25.2	(Finland) Jouni Ampuja
Leg 3 (26 Aug)	SS19	Moksi — Leustu	40.84 km	(Finland) Kaj Kuistila	Mitsubishi Lancer Evo VI	23:10.8	(Argentina) Marcos Ligato
Leg 3 (26 Aug)	SS20	Talviainen 2	30.30 km	(Argentina) Gabriel Pozzo	Mitsubishi Lancer Evo VI	16:24.2	(Argentina) Marcos Ligato
Leg 3 (26 Aug)	SS21	Ouninpohja 2	25.20 km	(Finland) Kaj Kuistila	Mitsubishi Lancer Evo VI	13:04.8	(Argentina) Marcos Ligato

==== Championship standings ====
Pos.	Drivers' championships		
Pos.	Move	Driver	Points
1		(Argentina) Gabriel Pozzo	53
2		(Uruguay) Gustavo Trelles	26
3	1	(Argentina) Marcos Ligato	22
4	1	(Austria) Manfred Stohl	12
5		(Switzerland) Olivier Gillet	10

=== FIA Cup for Super 1600 Drivers ===
==== Classification ====
Position		No.	Driver	Co-driver	Entrant	Car	Time	Difference	Points
Event	Class	No.	Driver	Co-driver	Entrant	Car	Time	Difference	Points
28	1	53	(France) Sébastien Loeb	(Monaco) Daniel Elena	(France) Citroën Sport	Citroën Saxo S1600	3:49:19.6		10
34	2	52	(Italy) Andrea Dallavilla	(Italy) Giovanni Bernacchini	(Italy) R&D Motorsport	Fiat Punto S1600	3:54:41.5	+5:21.9	6
36	3	62	(Finland) Jussi Välimäki	(Finland) Jakke Honkanen	(Finland) ST Motors	Peugeot 206 S1600	3:57:13.0	+7:53.4	4
39	4	54	(Belgium) Larry Cols	(Belgium) Yasmine Gerard	(Belgium) Peugeot Bastos Racing	P9eugeot 206 S1600	3:59:03.6	+9:44.0	3
44	5	61	(Italy) Corrado Fontana	(Italy) Renzo Casazza	(Italy) H.F. Grifone SRL	Peugeot 206 S1600	4:05:18.7	+15:59.1	2
48	6	65	(Paraguay) Alejandro Galanti	(Paraguay) Fernando Zuleta	(Italy) Astra Racing	Ford Puma S1600	4:11:06.4	+21:46.8	1
79	7	67	(Andorra) Albert Llovera	(Spain) Marc Corral	(Spain) Pronto Racing	Fiat Punto S1600	5:01:38.4	+1:12:18.8	0
Retired SS19		59	(France) Benoît Rousselot	(France) Gilles Mondésir	(United Kingdom) Ford Motor Co. Ltd.	Ford Puma S1600	Steering		0
Retired SS19		68	(Italy) Massimo Ceccato	(Italy) Mitia Dotta	(Italy) Hawk Racing Club	Fiat Punto S1600	Accident		0
Retired SS19		71	(Belgium) François Duval	(Belgium) Jean-Marc Fortin	(United Kingdom) Ford Motor Co. Ltd.	Ford Puma S1600	Alternator		0
Retired SS19		73	(Italy) Christian Chemin	(Italy) Matteo Alberto Bacchin	(Italy) Hawk Racing Club	Fiat Punto S1600	Accident		0
Retired SS7		56	(Italy) Giandomenico Basso	(Italy) Flavio Guglielmini	(Italy) Top Run SRL	Fiat Punto S1600	Engine		0
Retired SS7		58	(Spain) Sergio Vallejo	(Spain) Diego Vallejo	(Spain) Pronto Racing	Fiat Punto S1600	Oil leak		0
Retired SS6		63	(Norway) Martin Stenshorne	(United Kingdom) Clive Jenkins	(Norway) Zeta Racing	Ford Puma S1600	Suspension		0
Retired SS5		50	(Austria) Manfred Stohl	(Austria) Peter Müller	(Italy) Top Run SRL	Fiat Punto S1600	Tyres		0
Retired SS5		55	(United Kingdom) Niall McShea	(United Kingdom) Michael Orr	(France) Citroën Sport	Citroën Saxo S1600	Transmission		0
Retired SS5		69	(France) Nicolas Bernardi	(France) Jean-Claude Grau	(France) Team Gamma	Peugeot 206 S1600	Engine		0
Retired SS4		64	(Italy) Massimo Macaluso	(Italy) Antonio Celot	(Italy) R&D Motorsport	Fiat Punto S1600	Accident		0
Retired SS3		57	(France) Cédric Robert	(France) Marie-Pierre Billoux	(France) Team Gamma	Peugeot 206 S1600	Radiator		0
Retired SS2		51	(France) Patrick Magaud	(France) Guylène Brun	(United Kingdom) Ford Motor Co. Ltd.	Ford Puma S1600	Accident		0
Retired SS2		72	(Malaysia) Saladin Mazlan	(United Kingdom) Timothy Sturla	(Malaysia) Saladin Rallying	Ford Puma S1600	Radiator		0

==== Special stages ====
Day	Stage	Stage name	Length	Winner	Car	Time	Class leaders
Leg 1 (24 Aug)	SS1	Valkola 1	8.42 km	(France) Sébastien Loeb	Citroën Saxo S1600	5:05.6	(France) Sébastien Loeb
Leg 1 (24 Aug)	SS2	Lankamaa 1	23.47 km	(Italy) Andrea Dallavilla	Fiat Punto S1600	13:01.2	(Italy) Andrea Dallavilla
Leg 1 (24 Aug)	SS3	Laukaa 1	12.40 km	(France) Sébastien Loeb	Citroën Saxo S1600	6:48.7	(France) Sébastien Loeb
Leg 1 (24 Aug)	SS4	Mökkiperä	13.38 km	(Austria) Manfred Stohl	Fiat Punto S1600	7:14.9	(France) Sébastien Loeb
Leg 1 (24 Aug)	SS5	Palsankylä	25.47 km	(Italy) Andrea Dallavilla	Fiat Punto S1600	15:32.0	(Italy) Andrea Dallavilla
Leg 1 (24 Aug)	SS6	Valkola 2	8.42 km	(Belgium) François Duval	Ford Puma S1600	5:14.1	(Italy) Andrea Dallavilla
Leg 1 (24 Aug)	SS7	Lankamaa 2	23.47 km	(France) Sébastien Loeb	Citroën Saxo S1600	13:18.7	(France) Sébastien Loeb
Leg 1 (24 Aug)	SS8	Laukaa 2	12.40 km	(France) Sébastien Loeb	Citroën Saxo S1600	6:49.3	(France) Sébastien Loeb
Leg 1 (24 Aug)	SS9	SSS Killeri 1	2.06 km	(France) Sébastien Loeb	Citroën Saxo S1600	1:31.1	(France) Sébastien Loeb
Leg 2 (25 Aug)	SS10	Talviainen 1	30.30 km	(Belgium) François Duval	Ford Puma S1600	16:40.1	(France) Sébastien Loeb
Leg 2 (25 Aug)	SS11	Västilä	17.40 km	(Italy) Andrea Dallavilla	Fiat Punto S1600	9:06.9	(France) Sébastien Loeb
Leg 2 (25 Aug)	SS12	Päijälä	12.81 km	(France) Sébastien Loeb	Citroën Saxo S1600	6:36.6	(France) Sébastien Loeb
Leg 2 (25 Aug)	SS13	Ehikki	19.07 km	(France) Sébastien Loeb	Citroën Saxo S1600	10:35.9	(Belgium) François Duval
Leg 2 (25 Aug)	SS14	Parkkola	15.80 km	(France) Sébastien Loeb	Citroën Saxo S1600	8:59.5	(Belgium) François Duval
Leg 2 (25 Aug)	SS15	Leustu	23.58 km	(France) Sébastien Loeb	Citroën Saxo S1600	13:08.2	(France) Sébastien Loeb
Leg 2 (25 Aug)	SS16	Ouninpohja 1	34.11 km	(France) Sébastien Loeb	Citroën Saxo S1600	18:20.3	(France) Sébastien Loeb
Leg 2 (25 Aug)	SS17	Vaheri	25.42 km	(France) Sébastien Loeb	Citroën Saxo S1600	13:45.1	(France) Sébastien Loeb
Leg 2 (25 Aug)	SS18	SSS Killeri 2	2.06 km	(France) Sébastien Loeb	Citroën Saxo S1600	1:30.9	(France) Sébastien Loeb
Leg 3 (26 Aug)	SS19	Moksi — Leustu	40.84 km	(France) Sébastien Loeb	Citroën Saxo S1600	23:32.7	(France) Sébastien Loeb
Leg 3 (26 Aug)	SS20	Talviainen 2	30.30 km	(Italy) Andrea Dallavilla	Fiat Punto S1600	16:52.8	(France) Sébastien Loeb
Leg 3 (26 Aug)	SS21	Ouninpohja 2	25.20 km	(Belgium) Larry Cols	Peugeot 206 S1600	13:29.7	(France) Sébastien Loeb

==== Championship standings ====
Pos.	Drivers' championships		
Pos.	Move	Driver	Points
1		(France) Sébastien Loeb	30
2		(Italy) Andrea Dallavilla	14
3		(Norway) Martin Stenshorne	7
4		(Italy) Giandomenico Basso	6
5		(Italy) Corrado Fontana	6
