= Carl Poscha =

Welsh rally driver and lorry driver

Personal information
- Nationality: (United Kingdom) British
- Born: 20 May 1965; St. Asaph, Denbighshire, Wales
- Died: 7 April 2008 (aged 42); Dolgellau, Gwynedd, Wales

World Rally Championship record
- Years active: 2001
- Teams: Privateer
- Rallies: 1
- Championships: 0
- Rally wins: 0
- Podiums: 0
- Stage wins: 0
- Total points: 0
- First rally: 2001 Rally Finland
- Last rally: 2001 Rally Finland

Carl Francis Poscha (20 May 1965 – 7 April 2008) was a part-time rally driver and lorry driver from Glan Conwy in Wales.

Poscha was twice married and a rally enthusiast, who travelled to Finland with his navigator Ray Hotty in August 2001 to compete in the WRC Rally Finland in a Citroën Saxo VTS. The duo's rally ended after an accident.

On 7 April 2008, Poscha committed suicide by hanging, aged 42, in a barn in Dolgellau. The inquest that was held into his death ruled a verdict of suicide.
