= Clio Renault Sport =

Hot hatch produced since 1998 by Renault Sport

Renault Clio RS
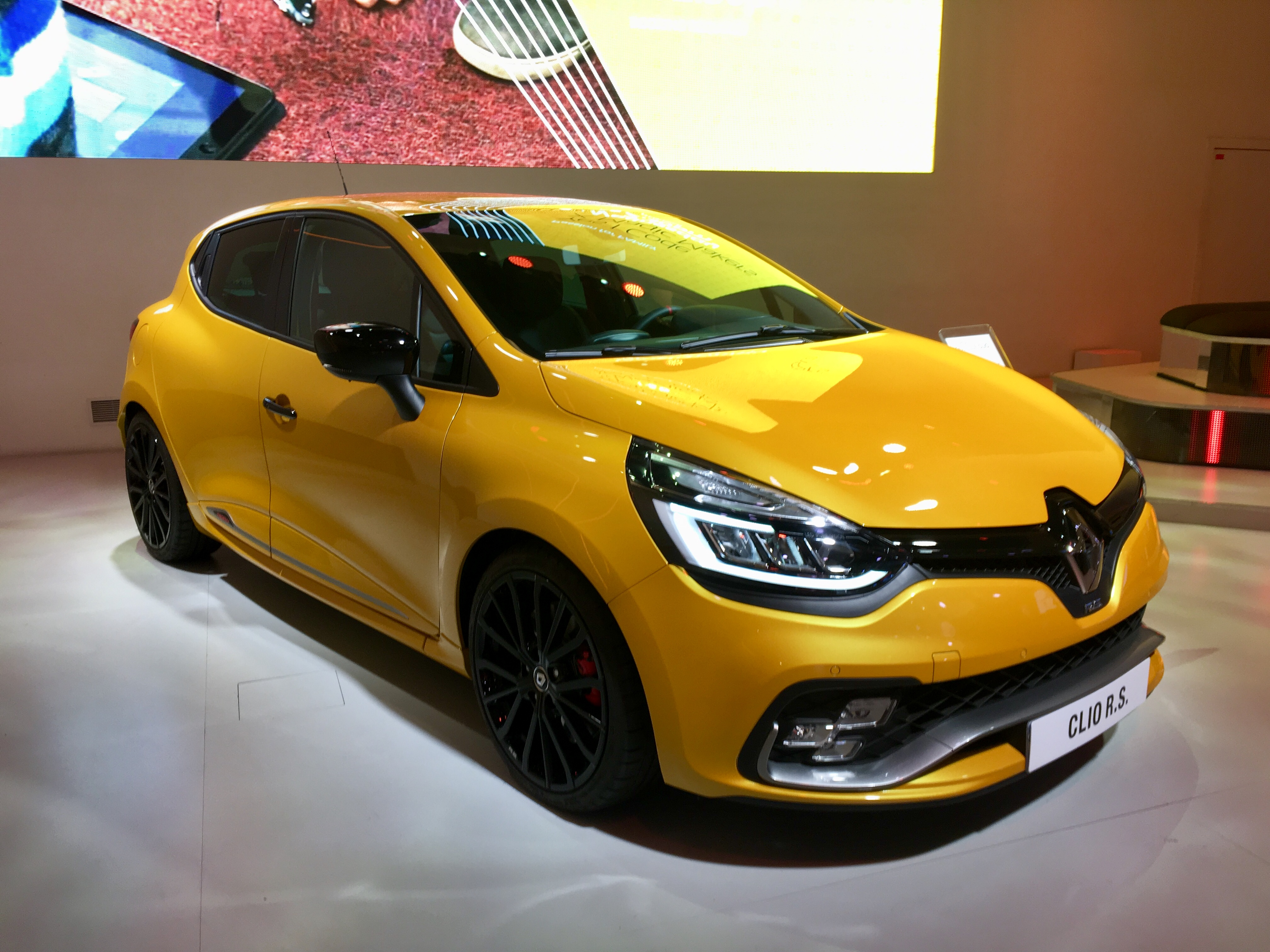

Overview
- Manufacturer: Renault Sport
- Also called: Renault Clio RS; Renault Lutecia RS; Renault Clio RS 172/182/197/200
- Production: 1998–2019
- Assembly: France: Flins (Flins Renault Factory)
- Designer: Patrick Le Quément (1998–2009); Laurens van den Acker (2009–present)

Body and chassis
- Class: Hot hatch
- Body style: 3-door hatchback (1998–2012); 5-door hatchback (2013–2019)
- Layout: FF layout
- Related: Renault Clio

Powertrain
- Engine: 2.0 L Renault F4R (1998–2012); 1.6 L Nissan MR Turbo (2013–2019)
- Transmission: 5-speed manual (1998–2005); 6-speed manual (2005–2012); EDC dual clutch (2013–2019)

Dimensions
- Wheelbase: 2,485 mm (97.8 in) (Mk II), 2,585 mm (101.8 in) (Mk III), 2,589 mm (101.9 in) (Mk IV)
- Length: 3,810 mm (150.0 in) (Mk II), 3,970 mm (156.3 in) (Mk III), 4,062 mm (159.9 in) (Mk IV)
- Width: 1,639 mm (64.5 in) (Mk II), 1,768 mm (69.6 in) (Mk III), 1,732 mm (68.2 in) (Mk IV)
- Height: 1,410 mm (55.5 in) (Mk II), 1,477 mm (58.1 in) (Mk III), 1,448 mm (57.0 in) (Mk IV)
- Curb weight: 1,021 kg (2,251 lb)–1,204 kg (2,654 lb)

Chronology
- Predecessor: Renault 5 Turbo; Renault Clio 16S Williams

The Renault Clio Renault Sport (or Clio RS for short) is a hot hatch produced from 1998 to 2019 by Renault Sport (or RenaultSport), the high-performance division of French automaker, Renault. It is based on the Clio supermini.

The engine and layout has remained relatively unchanged throughout most generations of the vehicle; a naturally aspirated 2.0-liter straight-four petrol engine with a FF layout and a three-door hatchback body style. However, the last generation was changed to a turbocharged 1.6-liter engine and a five-door hatchback body style.

== Clio II RS (172 Gen 1/Phase 1) ==
In 1999 Renault presented the first officially branded RenaultSport Clio, the third Clio produced by the RenaultSport division succeeding the Clio 16V and Clio Williams.

This new Clio, the 172, was based on the three-door Clio II shell but had numerous features over the standard car, including wider arches, restyled bumpers, side skirts and 15-inch OZ F1 alloy wheels.

Power was delivered by the F4R 730 engine, a 2.0-litre 16-valve Inline 4 engine with a Variable valve timing (VVT) system via a dephaser on the intake camshaft pulley. The engine was a modified version of the F4R used in models such as the Laguna and Espace and was modified by Mecachrome to deliver a power output of 172 PS (127 kW; 170 hp) at 6250 rpm. Power was delivered to the wheels via a JC5-089 five-speed manual gearbox, resulting in a 0-60 mph time of 6.6 seconds, as tested by Evo Magazine in their February 2000 issue.

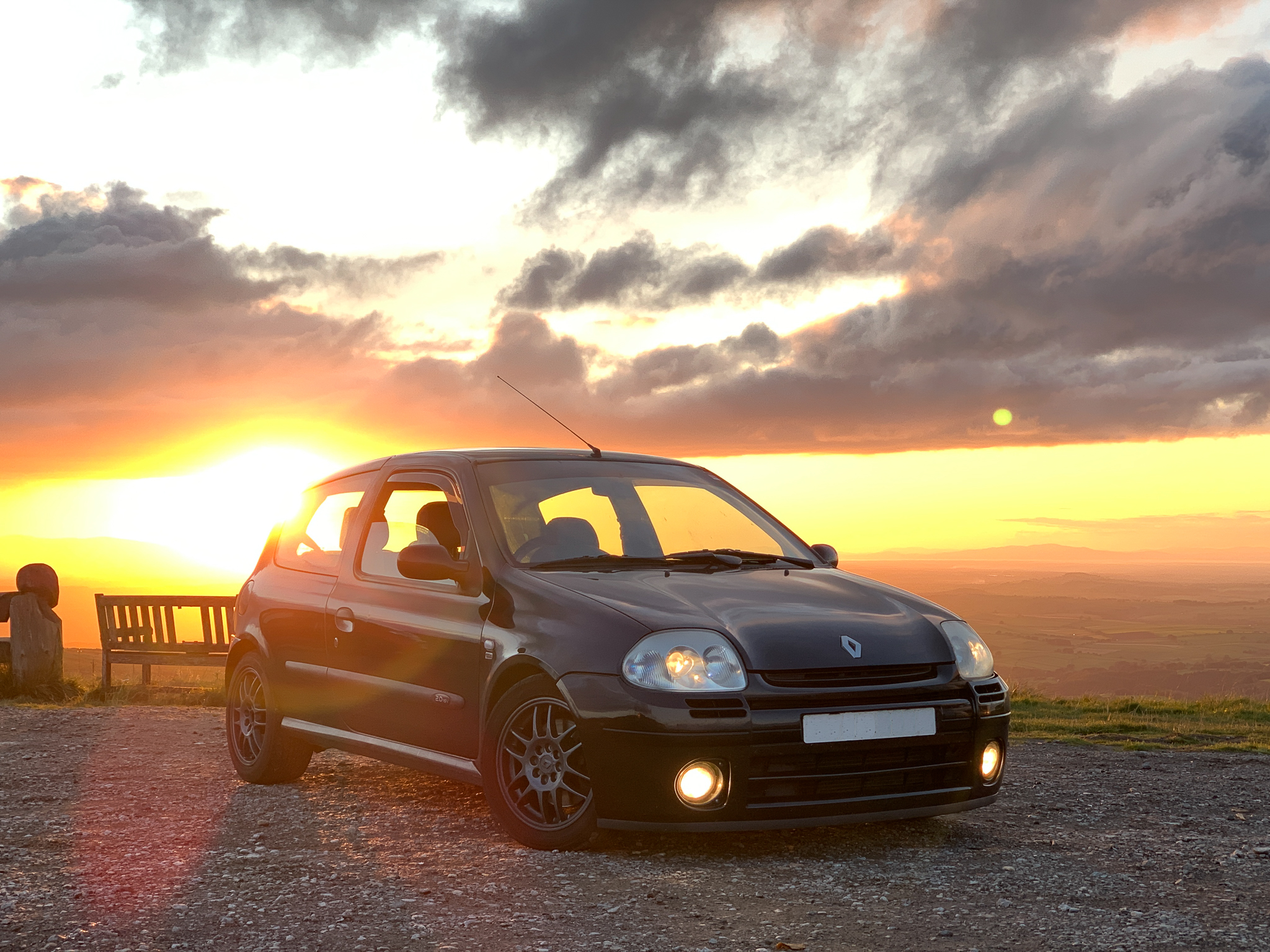
A Pearl Black Phase1 172, one of 117 produced by Renault for the UK Market, pictured here at the summit of Hartside Pass in Cumbria.

The 172 also featured interior changes over the standard car, including half leather, half alcantara seats embossed with the RenaultSport logo and equipped with side-impact airbags. The car also came standard with manually controlled air conditioning and a Radiosat 6010: 60W RDS radio, with a 6 disc multi-changer positioned underneath the passenger seat.

Upon its initial release to the UK market in January 2000, the 172 was only available in 647 Titanium Silver. However, six months later in June 2000, Renault would introduce four new metallic paints as an optional extra; 377 Sunflower Yellow, D44 Odyssey Blue, 676 Pearl Black, and B76 Flame Red. Following on from this in January 2001, Renault would then replace the 647 Titanium Silver with the new 640 Iceberg Silver, which was also the primary colour option for the Phase 1 Renaultsport Clio V6.

A limited edition of the Phase 1 172 was introduced in February 2001, known as the Clio 172 Exclusive. It was limited to 172 units, all of which were painted in 296 Scarab Green, featuring BBS alloy wheels and a 'Dune Grey' full-leather interior, as opposed to the half-leather half-alcantara seats featured in the standard car. Each Exclusive also came with a door-sill tread step featuring the RenaultSport logo and the individual vehicle number.

== Clio II RS (172 Gen 2/Phase 2) ==
In 2001, the Clio II received a major facelift, the Clio RS followed suit shortly after.

Introduced in June 2001, this facelift of the Clio 172 included redesigned front and rear bumpers, with the front bumper falling in line with the style of the face-lifted Clio II. The rear bumper was now less rounded and featured a strip of ABS plastic effectively splitting the bumper into two. The lights, bonnet and boot lid were also matched to the face-lifted Clio II. Three paint options were carried over from the Phase 1 for the new Phase 2; 640 Iceberg Silver, 676 Pearl Black & B76 Flame Red, while D44 Odyssey Blue was replaced with the new 432 Monaco Blue.

The interior was also changed to closer match that of the face-lifted Clio II, the seats were slightly revised however still featured the same Half Leather, Half Alcantara fabrics and the embossed RenaultSport logo. One new interior feature of the Phase 2 172 was automatic climate control, as opposed to the manual air-conditioning featured in the Phase 1.

The dashboard featured Silver interior trims and the steering wheel included a plastic insert featuring the RenaultSport logo. The gear shifter was changed from the metal ball featured on the Phase 1 to a leather wrapped shifter with a silver colored insert on the top.

The Phase 2 172 also featured increased equipment including automatic Xenon headlights with headlight washers and rain sensing wipers. From July 2002, ESP was fitted to all cars as standard, with cruise control being added to the MY2003 cars. The 6-CD multi-changer became an optional extra in November 2002. The 15-inch OZ F1 alloy wheels were also replaced with a 16-inch alloy wheel of Renault's own design.

The facelift of the 172 also brought about a number of changes to the engine of the car. A revised version of the F4R was introduced, the F4R 736. This featured a revised cylinder head with the exhaust ports being approximately 30% smaller than those featured on the Phase 1 172. The air-box was also redesigned to be much more square than the original air-box.

A revised version of the JC5 gearbox, the JC5-129 was introduced in this version of the Clio 172, which revised JC5 featured a shorter final drive to counter the increased weight of the face-lifted 172.

The catalytic converter, which on the PH1 172 had been dual barrel was reduced to a single barrel and featured 2 lambda sensors, one before and one after the catalytic converter. The biggest change to the PH2 172 over the PH1 was the removal of the cable throttle and the introduction of an electric throttle. This meant the Idle Control Valve of the PH1 was no longer required leading to a minor redesign of the intake manifold.

== Clio II RS (172 Cup) ==
In 2002 Renault released the 172 Cup, which bore the chassis code CB1N and was known by Renault as the "sport lightweight version". The 172 Cup was also sold in France as the "Clio RS Jean Ragnotti."

The vast majority of cars were produced in D43 Mondial Blue (metallic), with a limited run of around 90 cars being produced in 640 Iceberg Silver (metallic). The Cup, originally built for Gr.N homologation of the Clio 172, was differentiated from the "non cup" 172 by its lack of many of the luxuries included in the regular car. Instead of the leather / Alcantara seats, the same style seat was upholstered in a durable but low-cost fabric, the automatic Xenon headlights were replaced by manually controlled halogen units and the washer jets replaced with blanks. The rain sensing wipers and solar reflective coated windscreen were also omitted from the 172 Cup.

However the car had features not before seen on a production version of the 172, which included lightweight 16-inch Speedline Turini alloy wheels, matte blue door strips, ABS plastic "Cup" front splitter and a restyled "Cup" rear spoiler. The dash strips which were silver on the regular car were painted to match the outside of the car.

One of the main features of the 172 Cup was its significant weight saving, having a kerb weight of 1021 kg, making it the lightest of 172 versions produced. This was achieved by the removal of a majority of sound deadening from the car alongside thinner glass to reduce weight even further. One large difference was also the lack of air conditioning which was a standard fit component on the regular 172, which typically led to the cup producing more power due to the engine having less ancillaries to drive. The climate control was reintroduced as an optional extra in April 2003, but of the 2392 172 Cups registered in the UK, only 139 cars were supplied with climate control. The 0–60 time of the 172 Cup was officially marketed by Renault as being 6.5 seconds; however AutoCar Magazine reportedly timed the 0–60 at 6.2 seconds which if this were the case would make the 172 Cup the second fastest road going Clio produced at the time of this article, second to only the V6.

Many enthusiasts regard the 172 Cup as the last "hardcore" hot hatch due to its lack of anti-lock brakes and ESC, relatively low weight and powerful engine. The Cup featured redesigned suspension with a wider track thanks to modified wishbones, as well as the introduction of new Cup shock absorbers and springs, which were 20% stiffer in the front and 10% stiffer in the rear. The suspension geometry was revised to suit these components and as a result, the steering response was increased. This also lead to an increase for the potential of oversteer, due to the lack of weight and driver aids, alongside the revised geometry.

Due to the lack of ABS, the brake bias of the car was fixed by way of disconnecting the rear axle compensator. Within the UK this often lead to the cars failing the MOT test, VOSA eventually issued an advisory to prevent this from happening.

== Clio II RS (182) ==
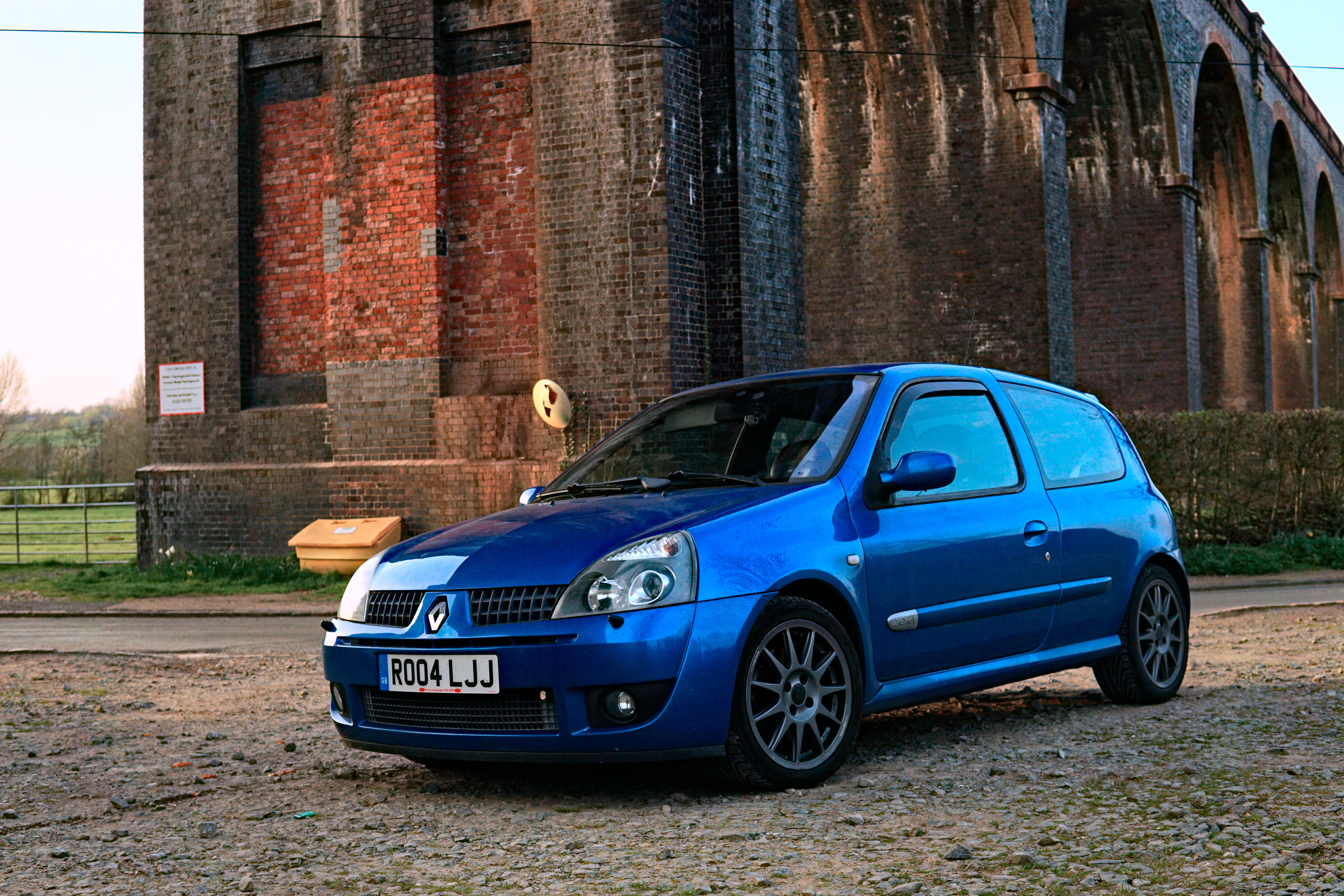
An Arctic Blue Clio 182 with both Cup packs and aftermarket Speedline Turini wheels.

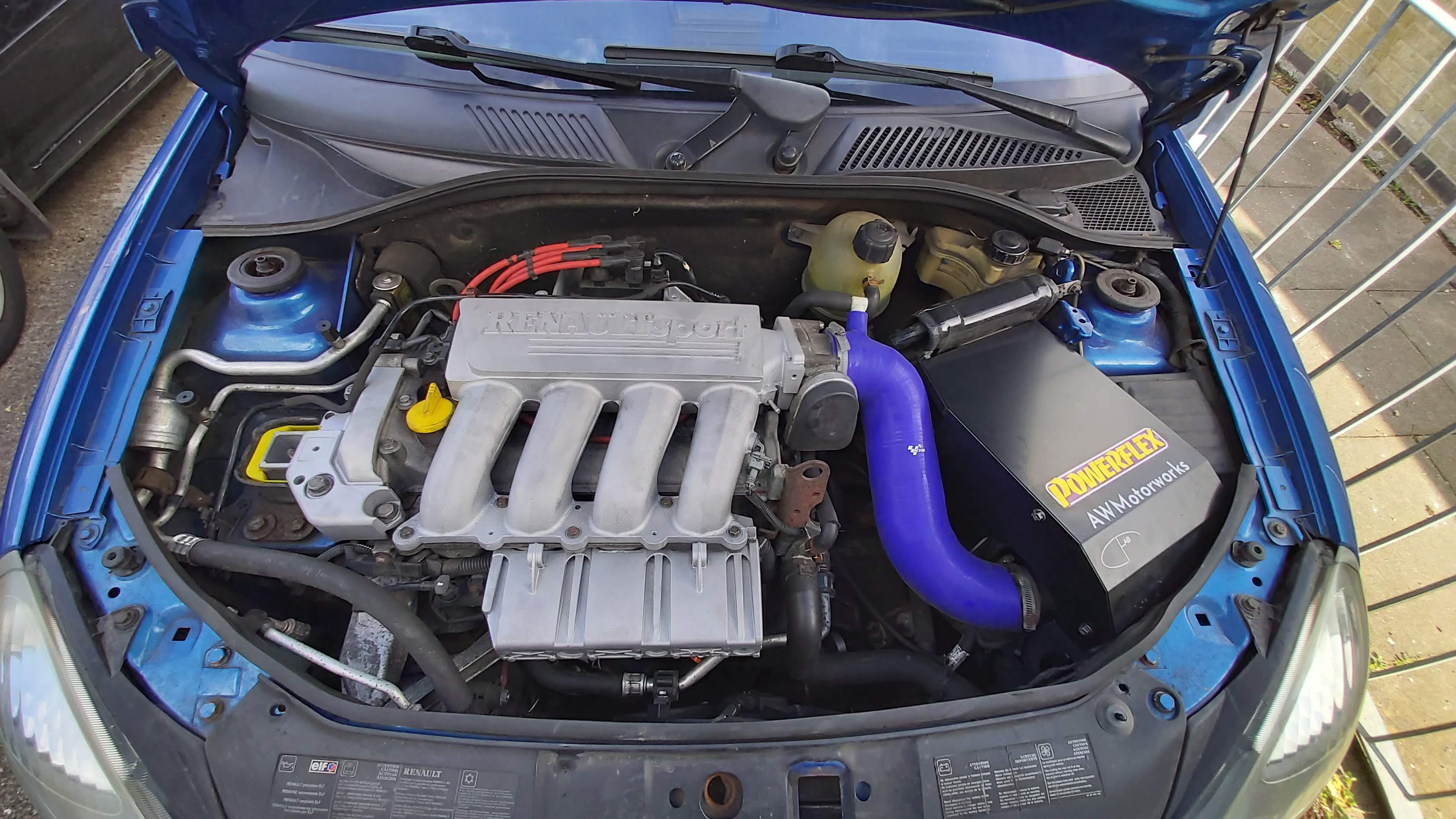
The engine bay of a Renaultsport Clio 182. An aftermarket induction kit has been fitted, as well as a battery cover.

2004 marked yet another refresh of the Clio II. The inserts of the headlights were changed from black to grey, new wheels styles were introduced and new colour options were added with others being dropped. The basic design of the car stayed the same with only minor changes. The six-disc CD changer was dropped as standard equipment however was still available as a cost option.

This refresh marked the introduction of cruise control and Electronic Stability Program (ESP) as standard equipment.

The Clio RS featured a lot more changes than the regular Clio. The engine was again revised and became the F4R 738. The difference between the F4R 738 and F4R 736 was a revised oil breather setup meaning the intake manifold found on a 172 would not fit a 182. Thanks to a number of other changes this engine produced 182 PS (134 kW; 180 hp) at 6500rpm. The main alterations were the addition of a 4-2-1 Manifold and high flow 200 cell sports catalytic converter. The spare wheel well was removed and replaced with a flat floor to make way for the new dual exit exhaust featured on the 182.

Minor revisions were made to the interior, the perforated texture of the alcantara on the seats now featured white dots. The car also featured a new 8 spoke wheel design which came in Silver on a regular car and Anthracite on a "Cup Packed" car.

The rarest optional extra available was the Carminat Sat-Nav which was fitted to very few cars. However, the unit wasn't a popular option due to its high cost and rumoured poor performance compared to aftermarket options.

The "Cup" Front Splitter and "Cup" Spoiler originally fitted to the 172 Cup made a reappearance as a cost option known as the Cup Style Pack. This was one of two cup packs available, the other being the Cup Chassis.

This Cup Chassis pack included a strengthened hub with 60mm spacing on the strut bolt holes as opposed 54mm on non cup packed cars. The Cup Chassis also featured lowered suspension with stiffer shocks and springs and an anthracite version of the standard alloy wheels.

== Clio II RS (182 Cup) ==
The Clio 182 could also be ordered in a more race focused than 'base' RS model called "Cup Specification", this was available in just two colours, J45 Racing Blue and D38 Inferno Orange, however came as Standard with the Cup Chassis and Cup Style Pack.

The 182 Cup lacked the automatic xenon headlights and headlight washer jets, climate control (rear footwell heater vents were also removed), illuminated sun visors, Solar Reflective Windscreen and Automatic Wipers.

The leather / Alcantara seats were replaced with cloth items and the rear bench was downgraded to match. The engine cover and sill plates were removed and the steering wheel was downgraded to no longer include the RenaultSport Logo or rubber thumb grips.

Carpet and headlining were downgraded to basic specification and even the documentation wallet was changed from faux leather to cloth. Sound deadening was removed from the 182 Cup, the horn was downgraded from a twin to single unit and the interior light no longer included a map reading function.

Despite all of these reductions in specification the 182 Cup was still considerably heavier than the previous 172 Cup, meaning this version of the Clio II RS was considered one of the least desirable versions.

== Clio II RS (182 Trophy) ==
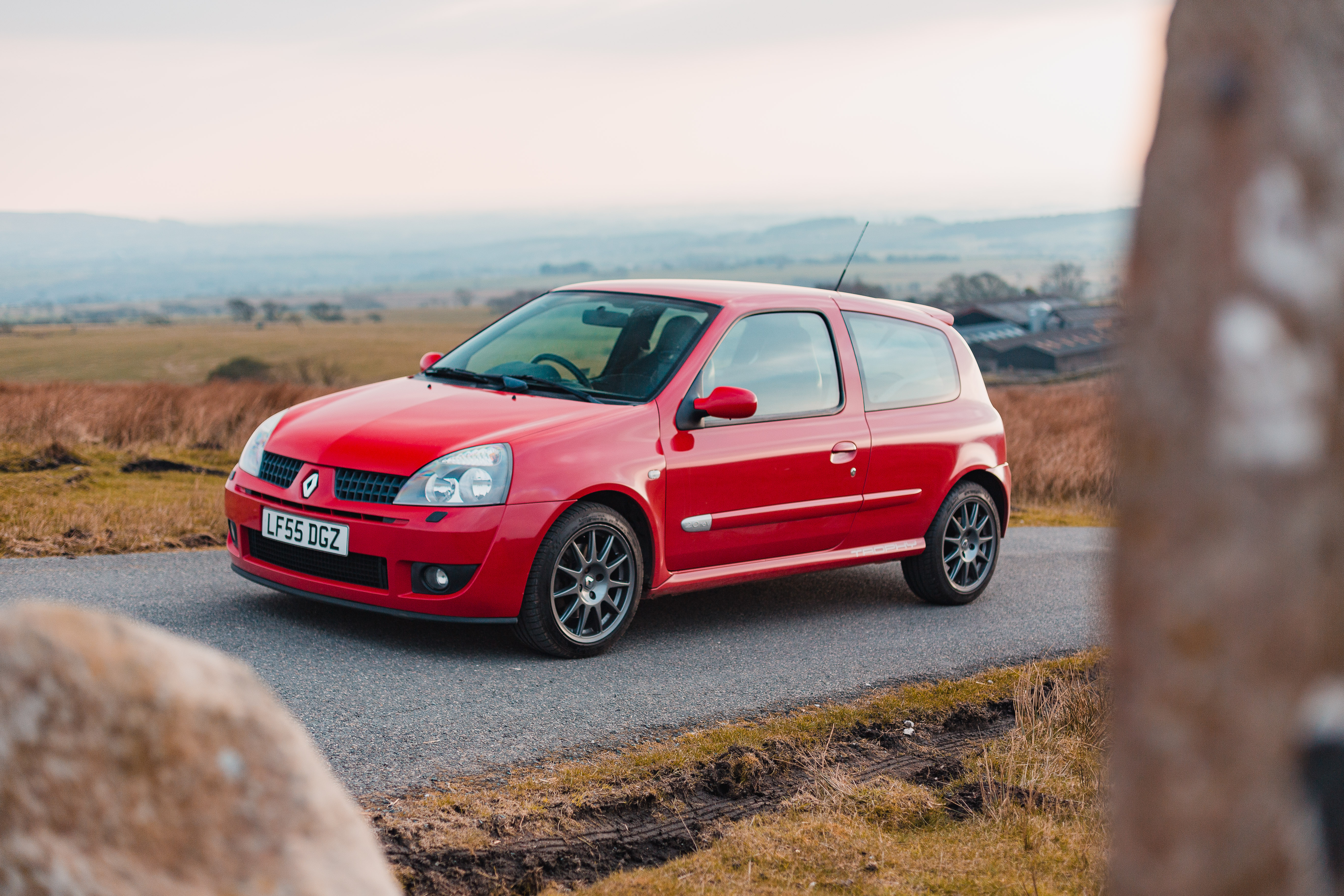
A Renault Sport Clio 182 Trophy

The final version of the Clio 182 was known as the 182 Trophy. This version was based on the 182 Cup and featured the same strengthened hubs with 60mm bolt spacing. Originally, 500 cars were to be produced for the UK market, however, an additional 50 were produced to be sold in Switzerland. At the time, believing there was no market for this version of the Clio, the Marketing Department of Renault France failed to order a 182 Trophy.

The 182 Trophy included 16 Inch Speedline Turini alloy wheels as seen on the 172 Cup, the spoiler from the Clio 255 V6, Recaro Trendline seats and exclusive 727 Capsicum Red paint with Trophy decals lacquered onto the side skirts. Each car had an individually numbered plaque on the base of the driver's seat.

The performance of the 182 Trophy was the same as 182 Cup except for the inclusion of Sachs Remote-Reservoir dampers. The basic principle of a Remote-Reservoir damper is that the separate reservoir for the gas or oil which fills the shock can either be of a reduced length or can house a longer rod, this means that the sizing of the shock can be optimised for the application in which it is being used.

These changes to the 182 Trophy led to its being heralded as one of the best hot hatches of all time and it won Evo Magazine's "People's Performance Car of The Year" 2005, whilst also beating off rivals such as the Lamborghini Gallardo and other exotica in an Evo Magazine Group Test. AutoCar Magazine's front cover from 5 July 2005 simply stated "World's Greatest Hot Hatch".

== Clio III RS (197) ==
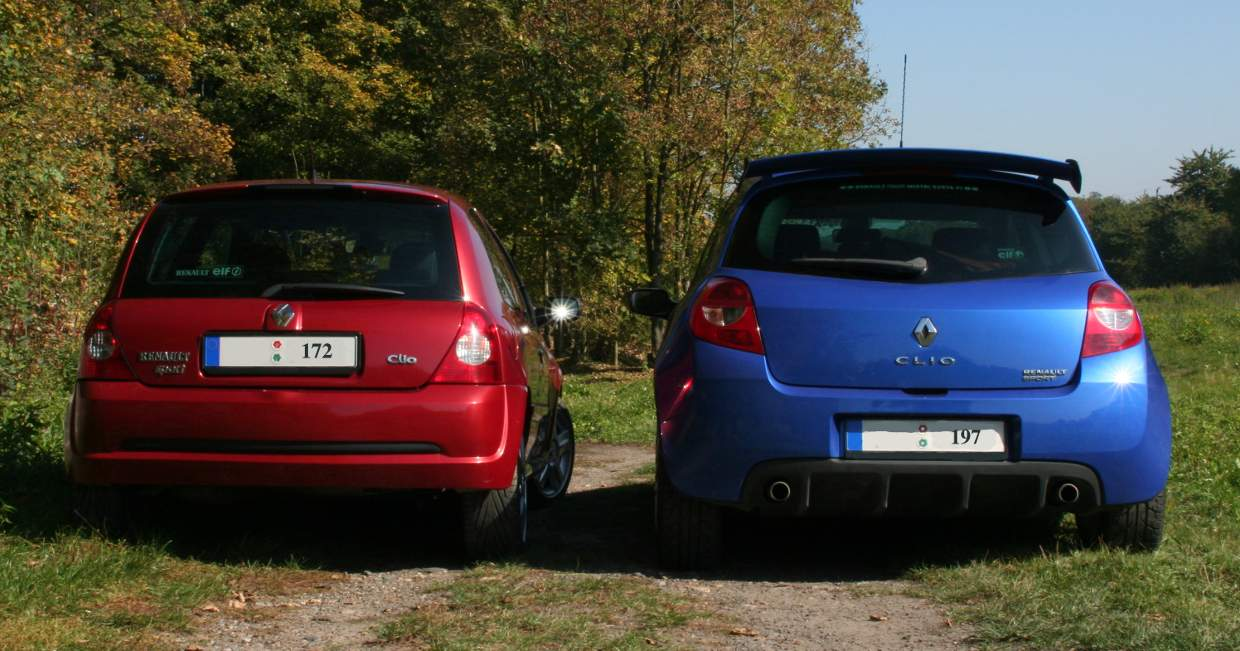

The new Clio III drew technology from Formula One, including a rear diffuser and brake cooling side vents, they upgraded the engine, now to 194 bhp (145 kW; 197 PS). The car is heavier than its predecessor, but the acceleration figures are slightly improved due to a combination of more power, torque and the new six-speed gearbox with shorter gearing according to the official figures published on the Renaultsport website www.renaultsport.co.uk.

== Clio III RS (200) ==
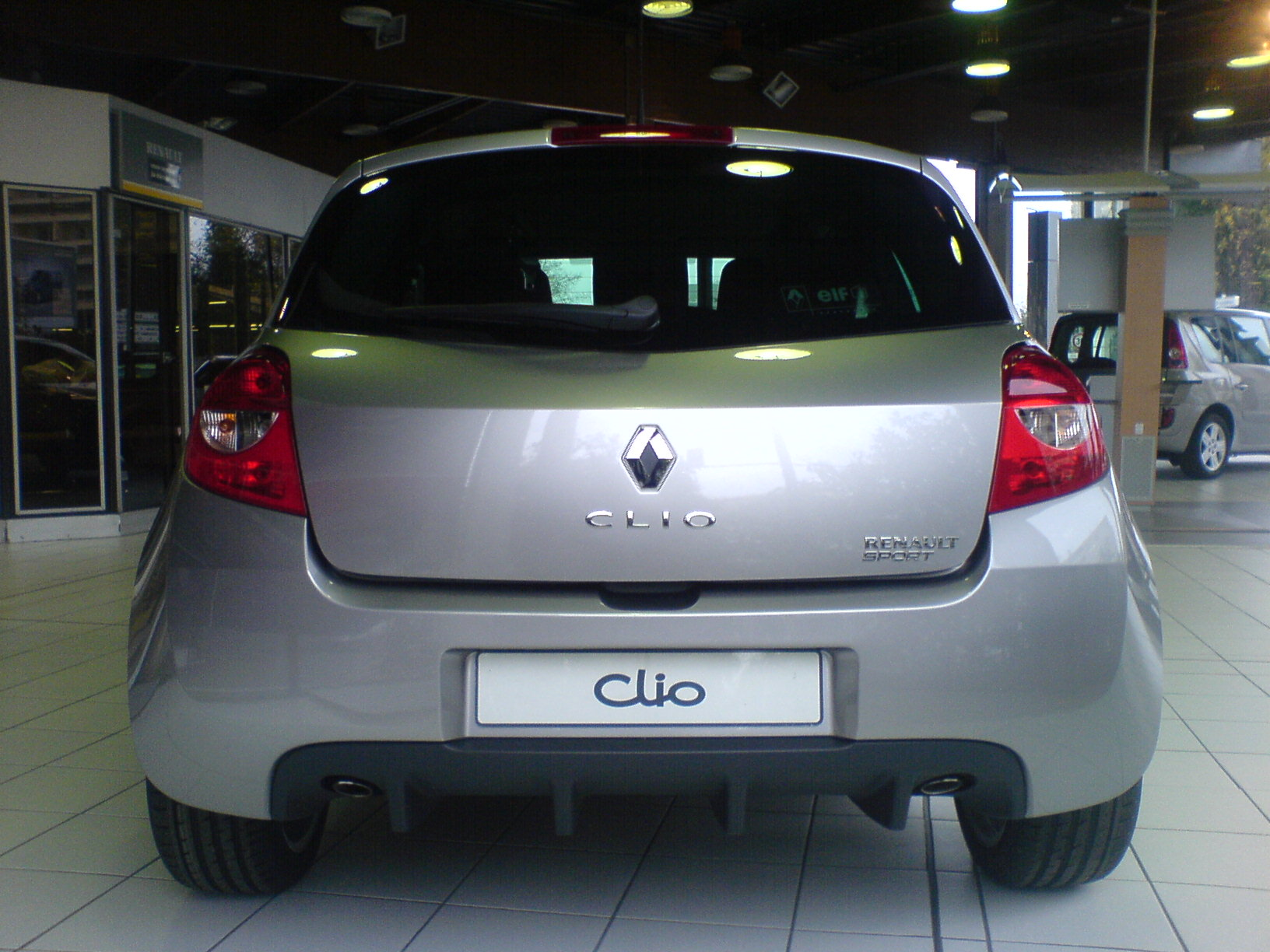

The facelifted Clio III is further enhanced with the inclusion of a front splitter and the engine now produces 197 bhp (147 kW; 200 PS). This has been made possible by tweaks to the exhaust system, valve timing and ECU also stated to give a slight increase in fuel economy. Acceleration figures are expected to be slightly improved due to shorter gearing in 1, 2 and 3 and enhancements have been made to the cup chassis including making the steering rack more responsive. Cosmetic enhancements include the addition of larger tailpipes protruding slightly from the rear diffuser, i.d. coloured front bumper insert, wing mirror covers and rear diffuser and i.d. interior trim. Renault also introduced a new i.d. paint option of Alien Green. The 200 is highly regarded by EVO magazine, claiming 5th in their top 10 cars of the year in 2009. It is hailed by PistonHeads as "the 911 GT3 of hot hatches" and has also remained CAR Magazine's "Best in Class" since its release in 2009 (At time of writing 9–11–2012).

RS Clio Performance Comparison (Official Figures)
Model	Displacement	Power	Top speed	0–100 km/h	Power/Weight
172	1998 cc	172 PS (127 kW; 170 bhp)	139 mph (224 km/h)	7.3 sec	160.38 bhp/tonne
182	1998 cc	182 PS (134 kW; 180 bhp)	139 mph (224 km/h)	7.1 sec	161.46 bhp/tonne
197	1998 cc	197 PS (145 kW; 194 bhp)	134 mph (216 km/h)	6.9 sec	158.88 bhp/tonne
200	1998 cc	200 PS (147 kW; 197 bhp)	141 mph (227 km/h)	6.9 sec	161.34 bhp/tonne

Keeping with an aggressive marketing campaign, Renault have publicly released many limited edition variants of the 200.

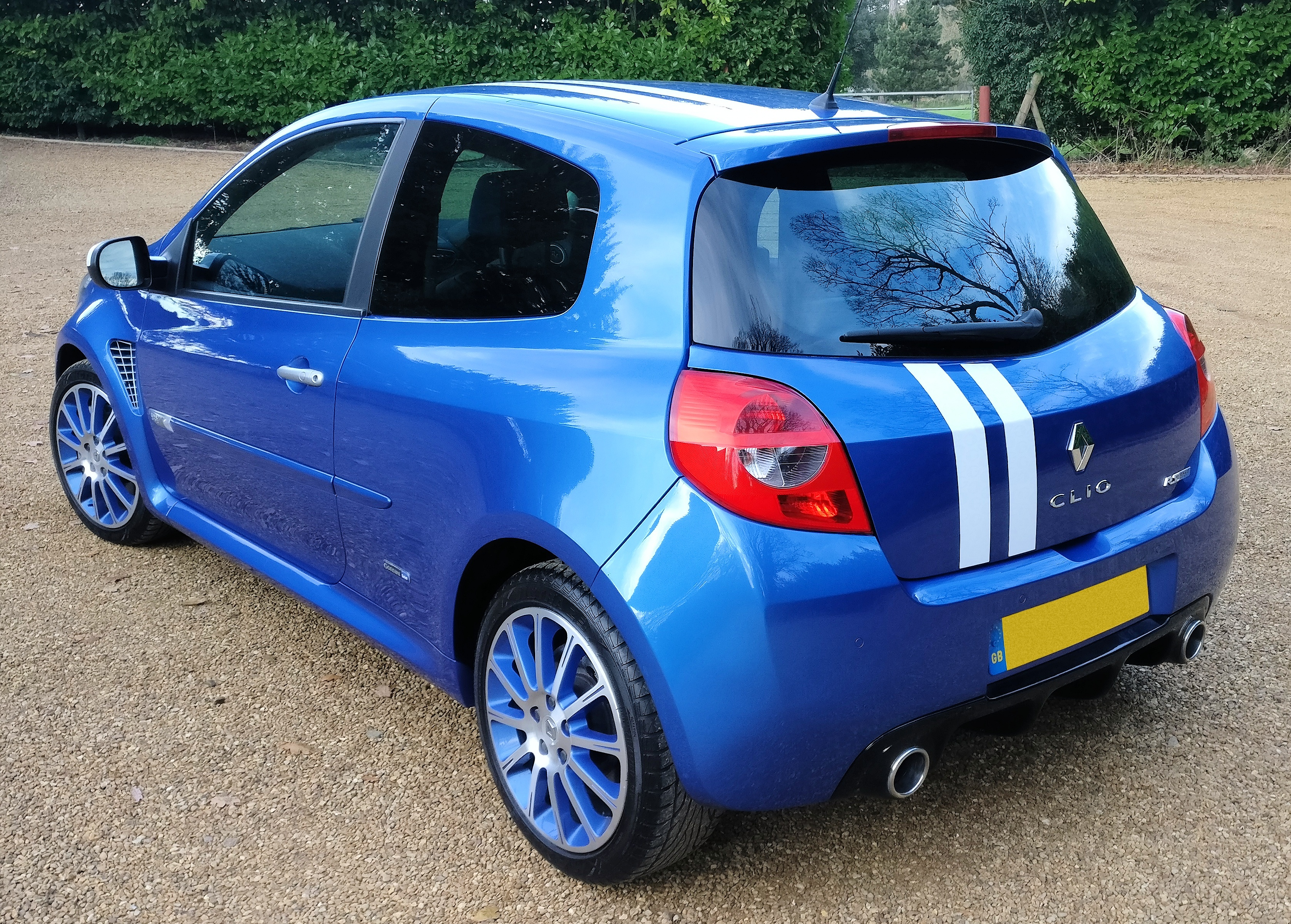
Renault Clio RS Gordini

=== Gordini ===
The Gordini was the first of the limited editions, with 500 limited in the UK and approximately 40 in Australia, but in other countries they were unlimited; it came in two colours: white and blue. The Gordini featured traditional off-centred stripes with a metallic Gordini badge texture along the exterior of the car that stretched from the bonnet over the roof and onto the rear hatch. The steering wheel featured the Gordini stripes and blue stitching throughout the interior. Other interior changes included Gordini leather stitched seats and a blue transmission fabric. The Gordini maintained the original 17" 12-spoke 200 Cup wheels but depending on the colour choice they had the inner sections on the spoke sprayed, blue for the blue Gordini's and Black for the White Gordini's. The Front bumper and rear diffuser were in gloss black and the front F1 Blade was in white for the Blue Gordini's and Grey for the White Gordini's. Apart from the Livery and slight cosmetic changes, the Gordini was mechanically the same as a standard 200 with Cup suspension package.

=== Silverstone GP ===
The Silverstone GP Edition was a special edition production run of 50, exclusive to the UK to celebrate the Silverstone Grand Prix. The 200 Silverstone Edition was released alongside the Twingo Silverstone Edition. It only came in Silverstone Silver and featured the optional extra 17" Renaultsport Speedline Black Alloys which are slightly lighter than the Standard wheels, and ‘Deep Black’ detailing around the car including the bumpers and diffuser, wing mirrors and the roof. The Silverstone GP Edition came standard with "Renaultsport" embroidered Recaro seats in silver-dot/Nardo Black fabric and a RS Monitor for logging G-Force and lap times.

=== Australian GP ===
The Australian GP Edition was a special edition run of 31 units, exclusively to Australia to celebrate the Australian Grand Prix. Similar to the Silverstone GP Edition, it featured the ‘Deep Black’ detailing across the car, including the front and rear bumpers, the wing mirrors and the roof. It came with the optional extra Renaultsport 17" Speedline Black alloys, Recaro seats as standard and the RS Monitor. The Australian GP Edition came in Renaults unique ‘Liquid Yellow’ colour that had previously been a huge success on the 197 R27 Limited Editions.

=== 20th Anniversary Special ===
The 20th Anniversary special Edition was available in a limited production run of 20 units during 2010 to celebrate 20 years of the Clio and 10 million sales. It was sold in ‘Pearlescent Givre’ (white). It features the same ‘Deep Black’ detailing of the Silverstone GP and Australian GP editions, with the gloss black roof, front bumper and rear diffuser. The wheels are the black Speedline 17-inch 200 Clio-Cup wheels. The front side vents, the mirrors and the F1 Blade were detailed in anthracite.

=== Raider ===
The Raider Edition, also known as the ‘Ange & Démon (Angel and Demons)’ Edition, featured Renault's first production i.d. matt paint of either ‘Stealth/Hologramme Grey’ or ‘Diavolo/Torro Red’, contrasted with gloss black roof, rear spoiler, F1-style front blade, rear diffuser and door mirrors. Raider edition included leather Recaro seats and gloss black 18x8J Interlagos wheels (derived from Megane R26.R) wrapped with Bridgestone REO50A tyres to match the renowned Cup chassis, with its lower ride height, stiffened suspension, quicker steering ratio and red Brembo brake callipers. Choice of TomTom Sat Nav or RS telemetry monitor completed the standard package.

=== Red Bull ===
The Red Bull Limited edition celebrated winning the Constructors World championship in 2011 with the RB7s, powered by Renault Engines. The RB Limited Editions included Cup chassis, ‘yellow dot’ fabric Recaro seats, Renaultsport Monitor and gloss black 18x8J Interlagos wheels (derived from Megane R26.R) wrapped with Bridgestone REO50A tyres. The body work is painted in black with strong yellow contrasts on the front F1 Blade, rear diffuser and wing mirrors. The production run was limited to 455 cars. (LHD markets only)

== Gallery ==
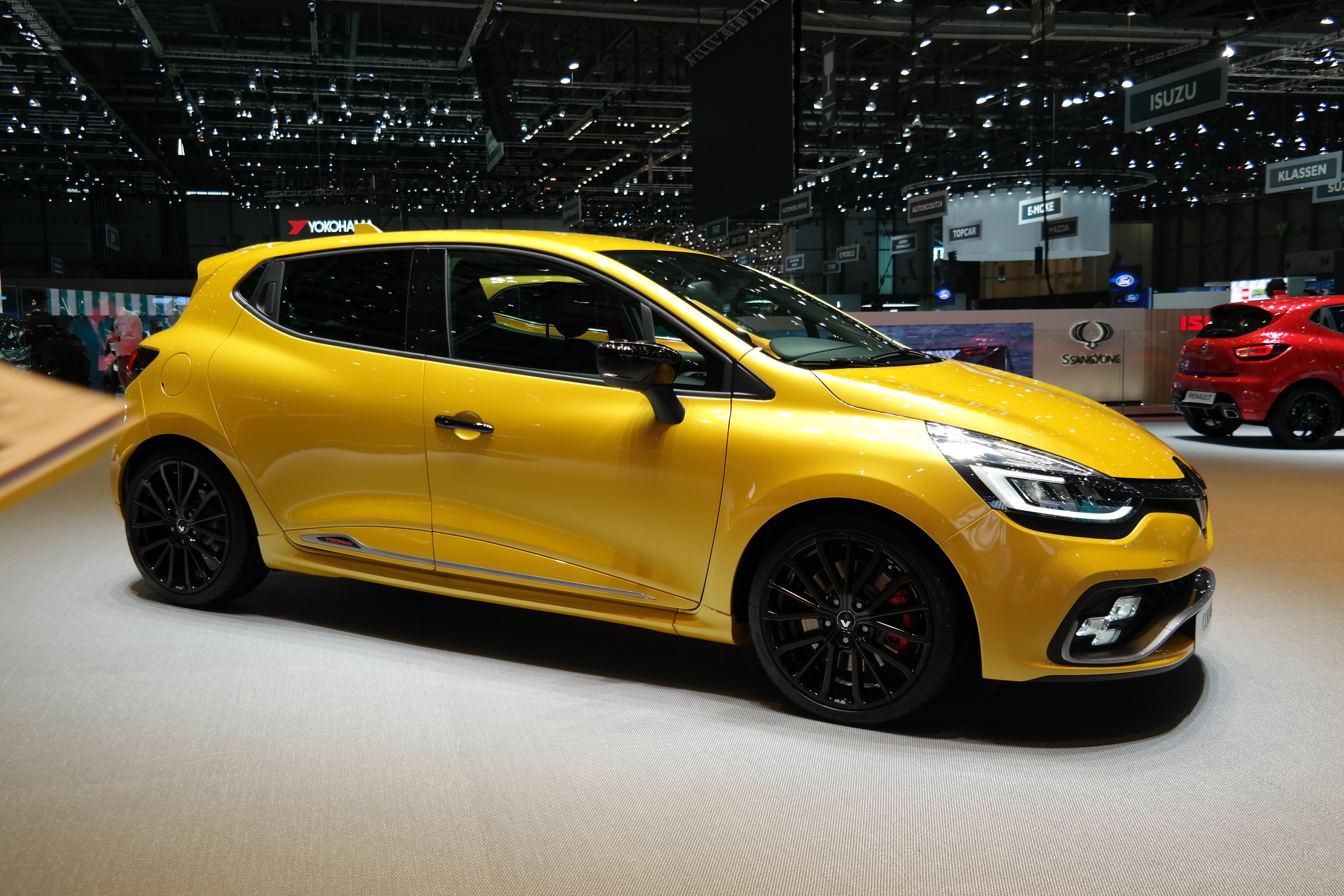
Clio RS IV facelift (2015–2019)

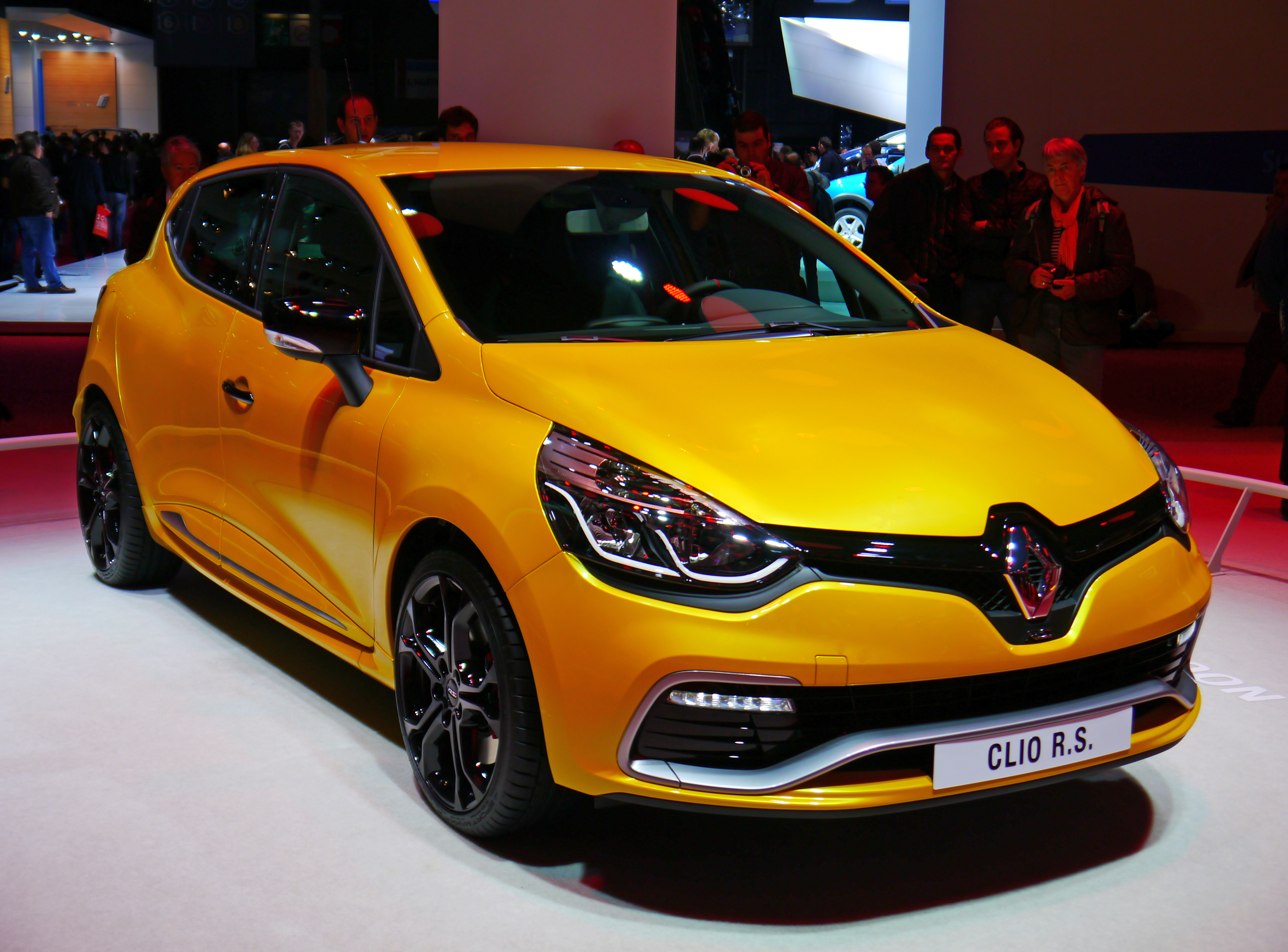
Clio RS IV (2012–2015)

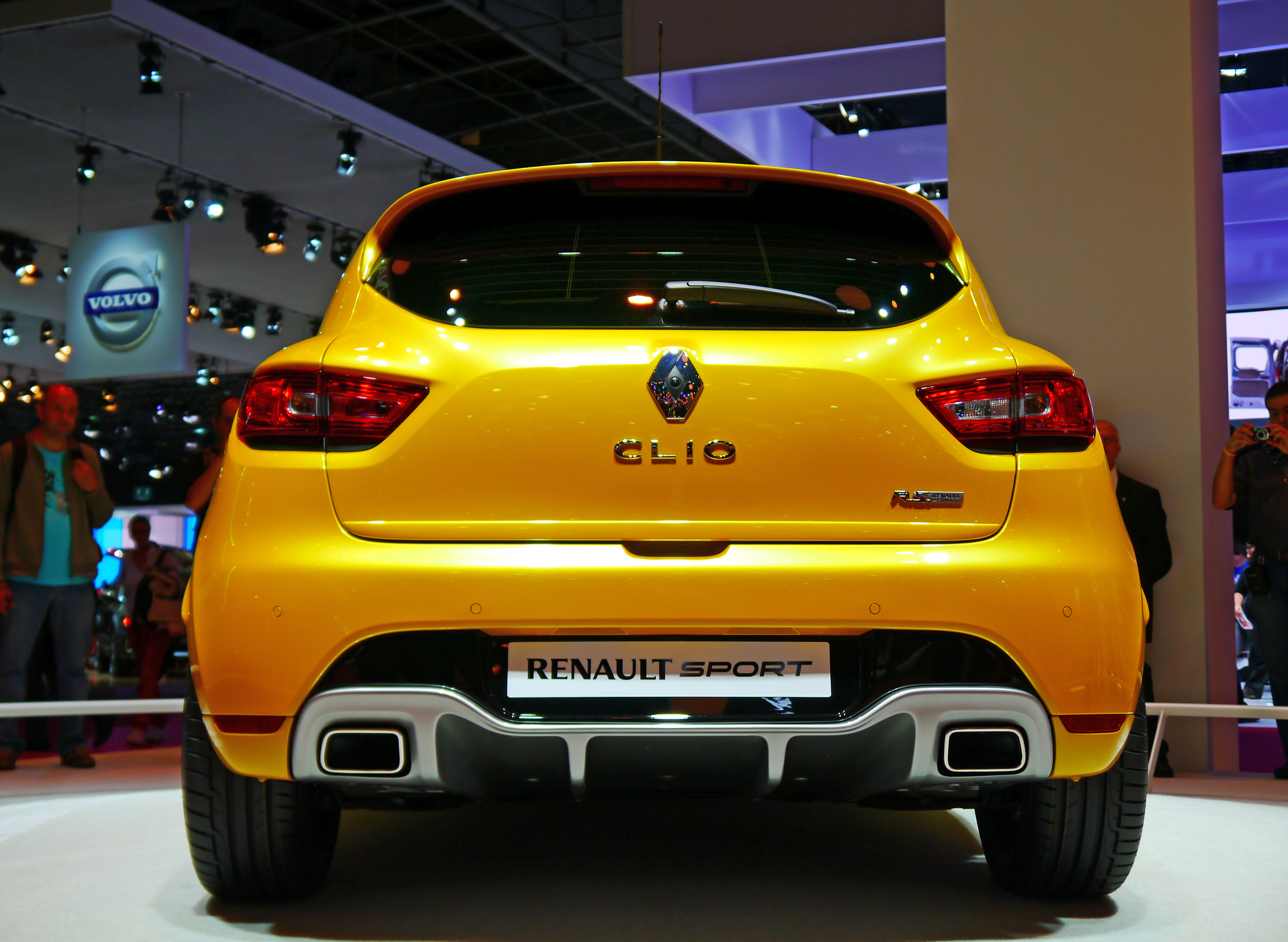
Clio RS IV (2012–2015)

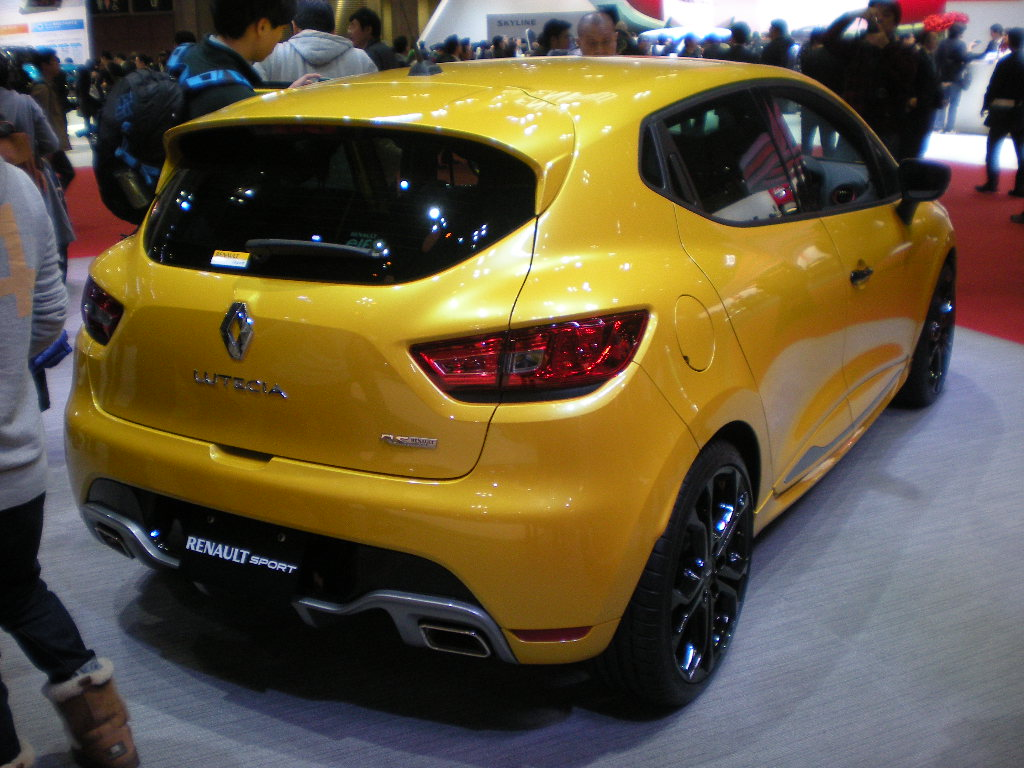
Clio RS IV (2012–2015)

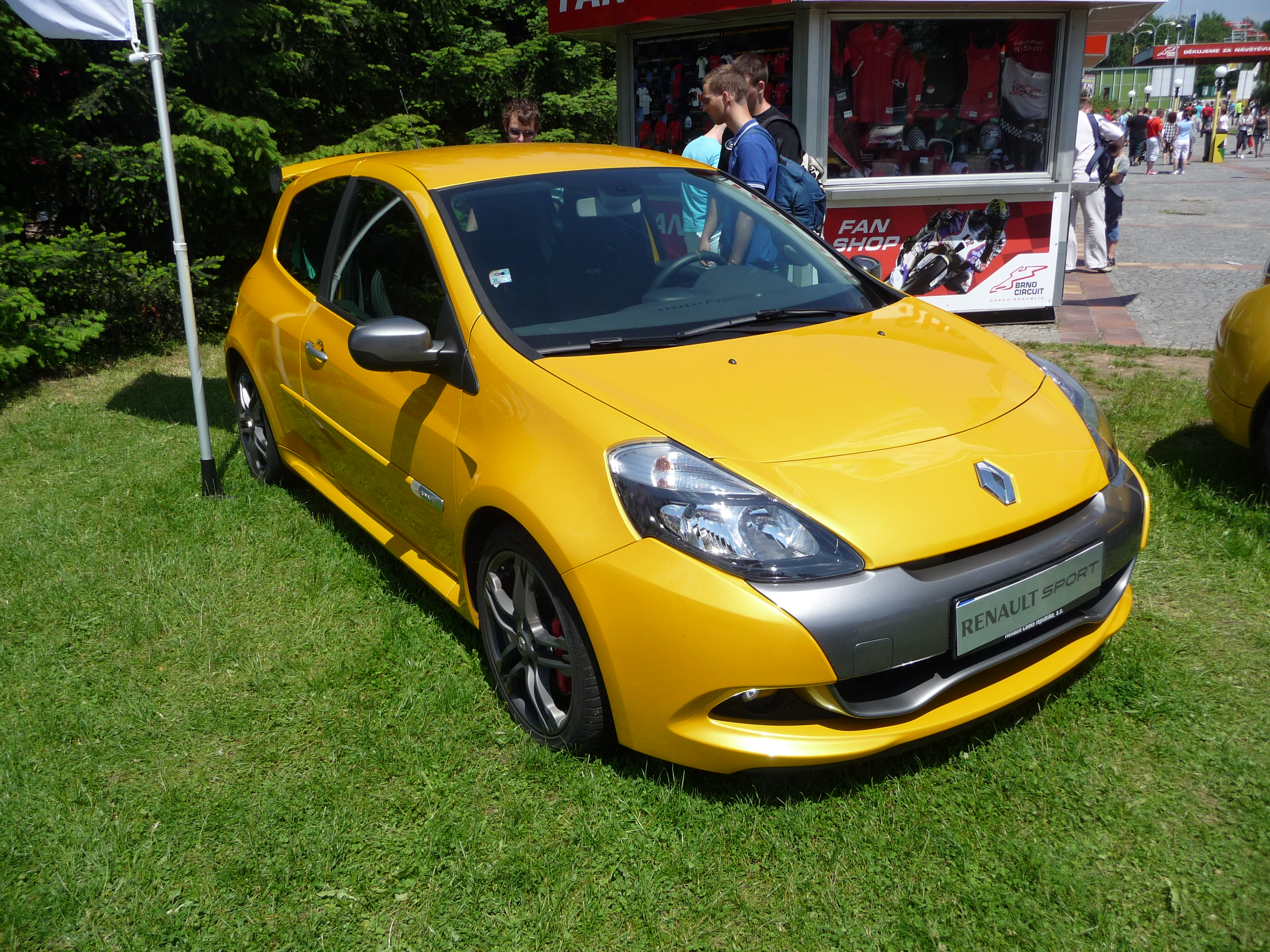
Clio RS III (2005–2012)

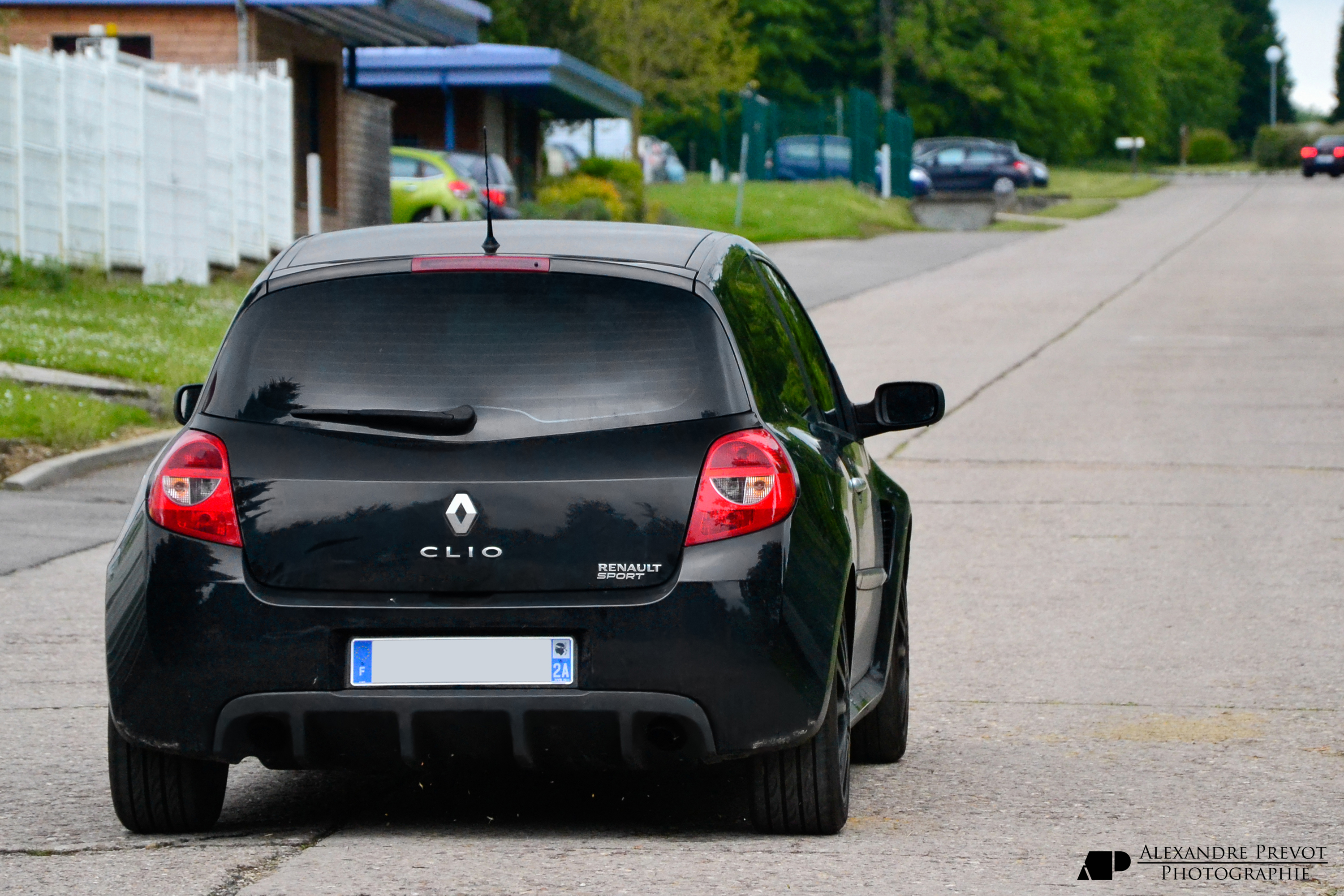
Clio RS III (2005–2012)

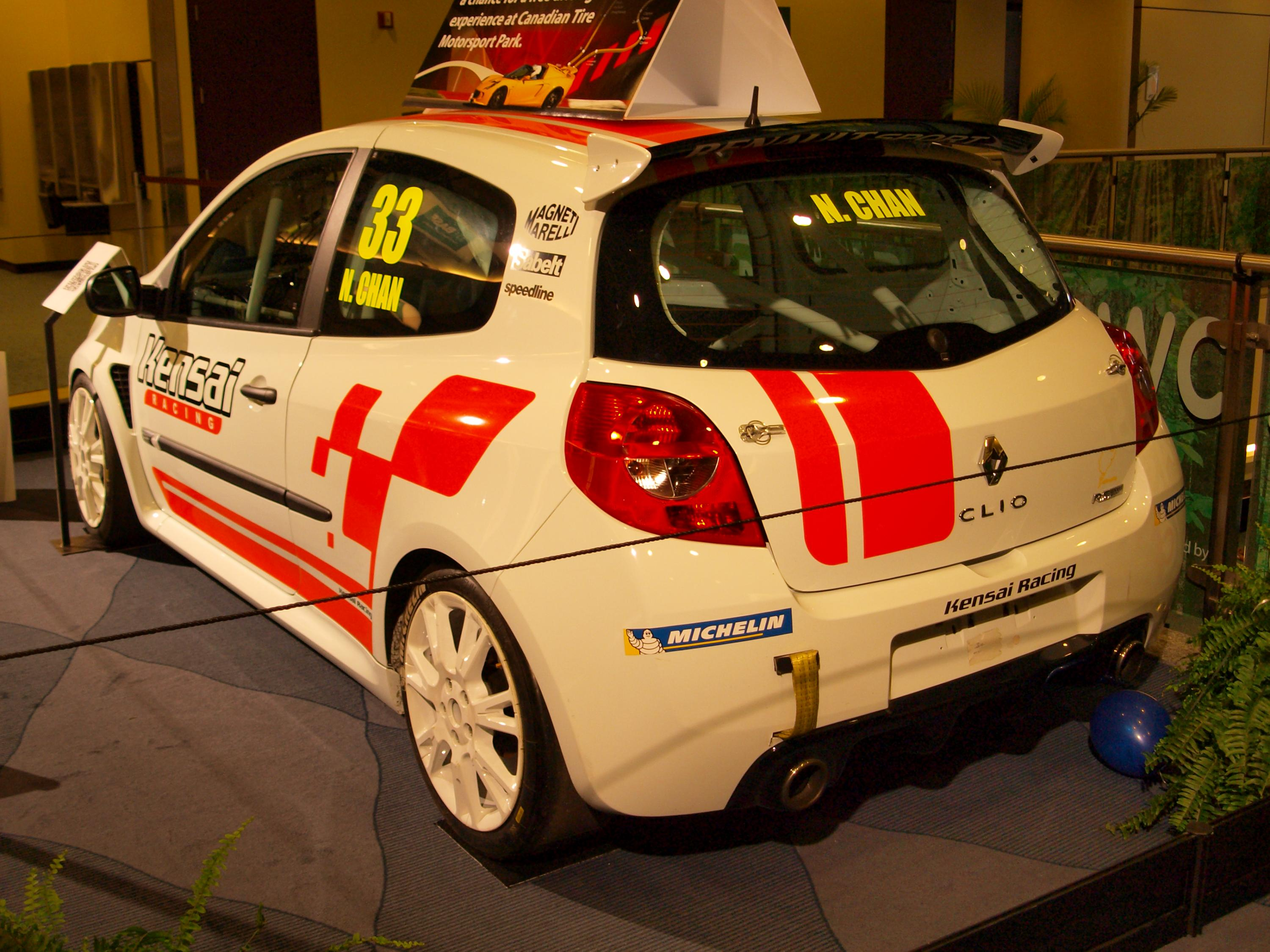
Clio RS III (2005–2012)

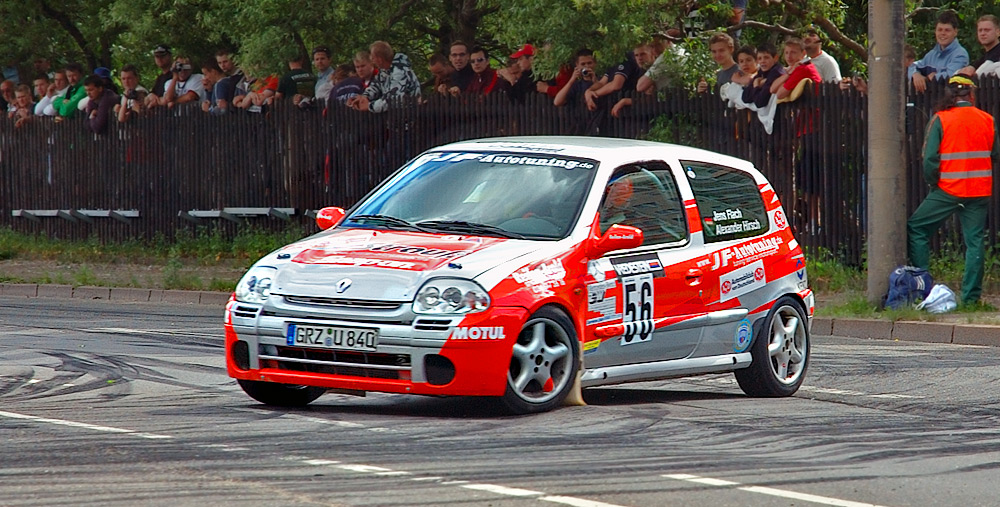
Clio RS II (1998–2005)

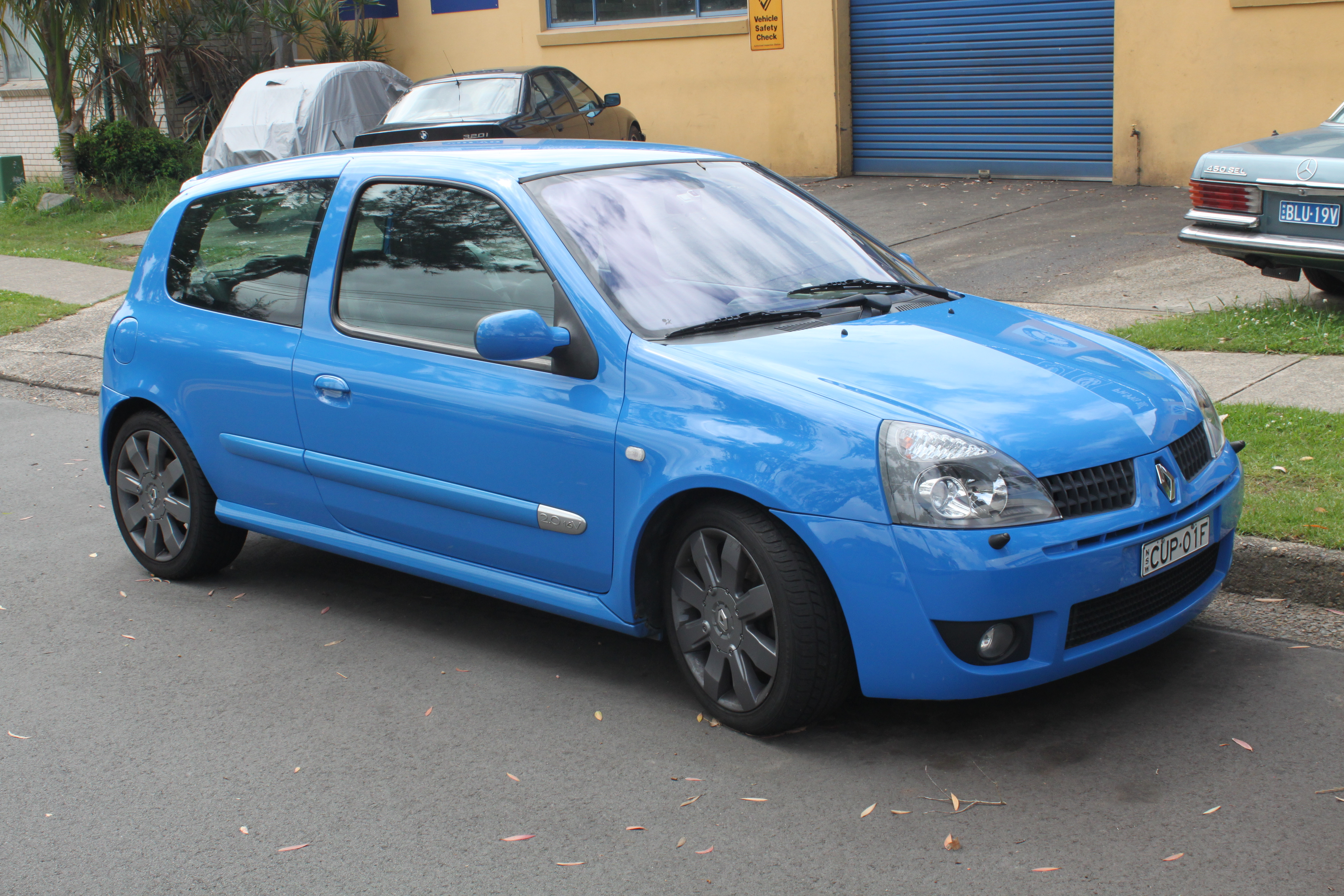
Clio RS II (1998–2005)

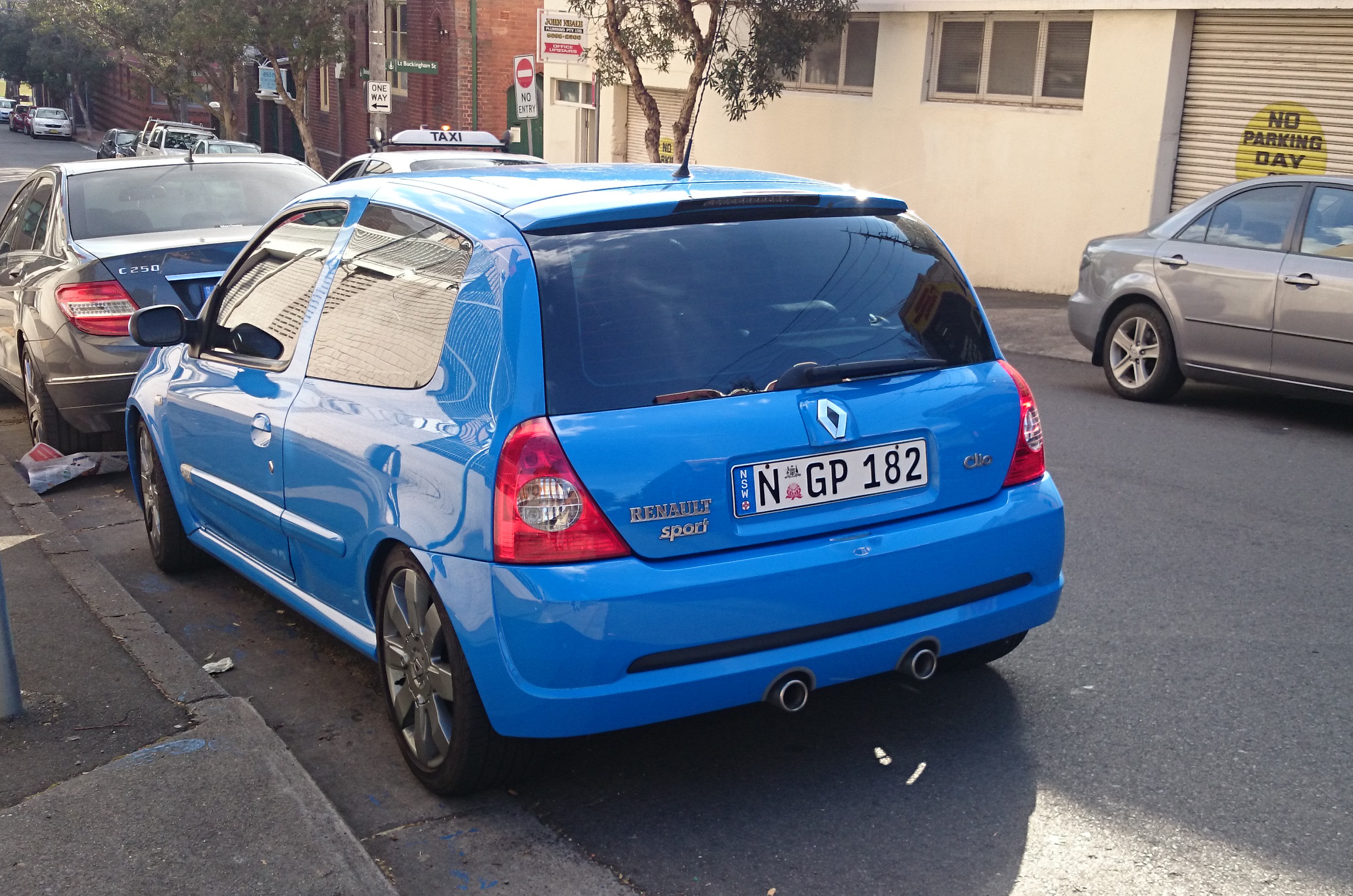
Clio RS II (1998–2005)

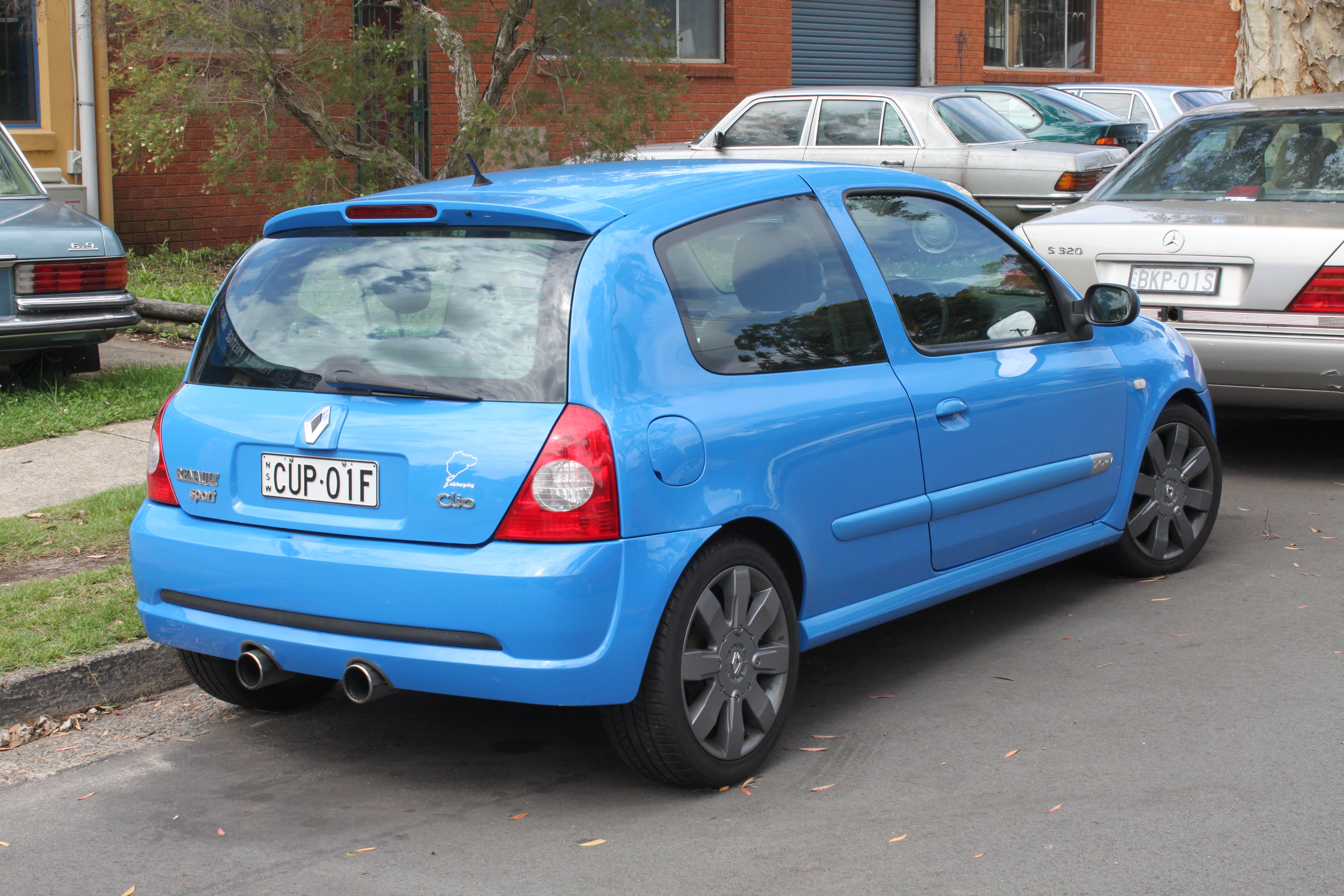
Clio RS II (1998–2005)

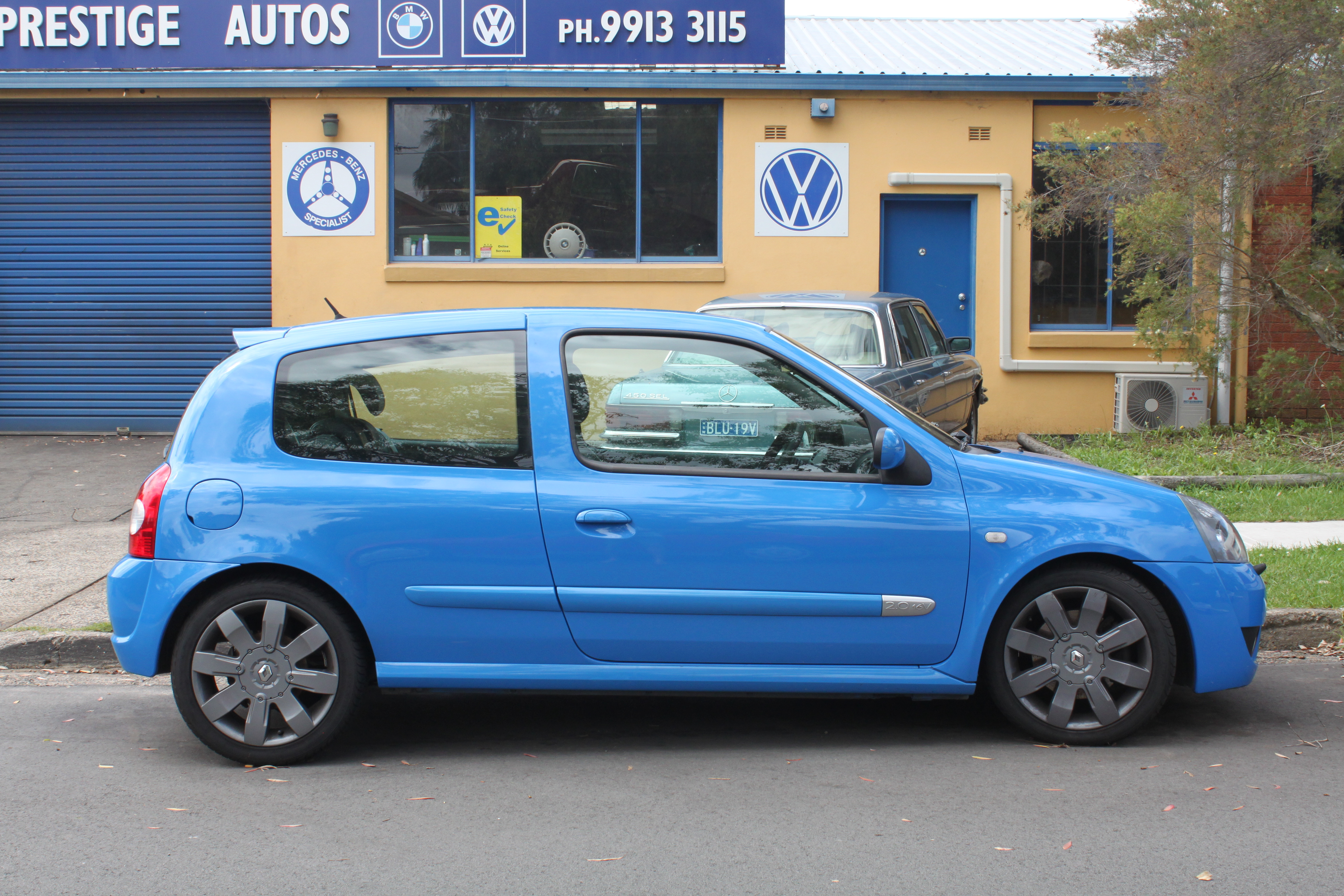
Clio RS II (1998–2005)

== See also ==
- Renault Clio V6 Renault Sport
- Renault Mégane Renault Sport
- Renault Clio Cup
