= Volkswagen World Rally Championship results =

The table below shows all results of Volkswagen Motorsport in World Rally Championship.

== WRC results ==
=== Group 4 era ===
Year	Entrant	Car	Driver	1	2	3	4	5	6	7	8	9	10	11	WDC	Points	WMC	Points
1978	Volkswagen Motorsport	Volkswagen Golf GTI	(West Germany) Jochi Kleint	MON	SWE	KEN	POR	GRE	FIN	CAN	ITA	CIV	FRA	GBR; Ret	—		12th	17

=== Group A era ===
Year	Entrant	Car	Driver	1	2	3	4	5	6	7	8	9	10	11	12	13	WDC	Points	WMC	Points
1982	Volkswagen Motorsport	Volkswagen Golf GTI	(Sweden) Per Eklund	MON	SWE	POR	KEN	FRA	GRE	NZL	BRA	FIN	ITA; Ret	CIV	GBR		5th*	57*	14th	14
1983	Volkswagen Motorsport	Volkswagen Golf GTI	(Sweden) Kalle Grundel	MON	SWE	POR	KEN	FRA	GRE	NZL	ARG	FIN	ITA	CIV	GBR; 8		16th*	11*	8th	11
1984	Volkswagen Motorsport	Volkswagen Golf GTI	(Sweden) Kalle Grundel	MON; 9	SWE; Ret	POR; 7	KEN	FRA; 13	GRE; Ret	NZL	ARG	FIN; Ret	ITA; 6	CIV	GBR; Ret		18th	12	8th	34
1985	Volkswagen Motorsport	Volkswagen Golf GTI	(West Germany) Jochi Kleint	MON	SWE	POR; Ret	KEN	FRA; Ret	GRE; Ret	NZL	ARG	FIN; 11	ITA; Ret	CIV	GBR		-	0	7th	29
1985	Volkswagen Motorsport	Volkswagen Golf GTI	(Austria) Franz Wittmann	MON	SWE	POR; Ret	KEN	FRA; Ret	GRE; 9	NZL	ARG	FIN; 12	ITA; 9	CIV	GBR		50th	4	7th	29
1986	Volkswagen Motorsport	Volkswagen Golf GTI 16V	(Sweden) Kenneth Eriksson	MON; 9	SWE; 7	POR; Ret	KEN; Ret	FRA; 8	GRE; 7	NZL; 7	ARG; 5	FIN; 12	CIV	ITA; 5	GBR; 11	USA	10th	25	3rd	65
1986	Volkswagen Motorsport	Volkswagen Golf GTI 16V	(Austria) Franz Wittmann	MON; 10	SWE	POR; Ret	KEN; 12	FRA; Ret	GRE; 9	NZL	ARG; 7	FIN	CIV	ITA	GBR	USA	35th	7	3rd	65
1987	Volkswagen Motorsport	Volkswagen Golf GTI 16V	(Sweden) Kenneth Eriksson	MON; 5	SWE; 8	POR; 3	KEN; Ret	FRA; Ret	GRE; Ret	USA	NZL; 2	ARG; 4	FIN	CIV; 1	ITA	GBR	4th	70	4th	64
1987	Volkswagen Motorsport	Volkswagen Golf GTI 16V	(West Germany) Erwin Weber	MON; 9	SWE	POR; Ret	KEN; 4	FRA	GRE; 6	USA	NZL	ARG; 3	FIN	CIV; 3	ITA	GBR	6th	44	4th	64
1988	Volkswagen Motorsport	Volkswagen Golf GTI 16V	(Sweden) Lars-Erik Torph	MON	SWE	POR	KEN; Ret	FRA	GRE	USA	NZL	ARG	FIN	CIV	ITA	GBR	20th*	12*	11th	14
1988	Volkswagen Motorsport	Volkswagen Golf GTI 16V	(West Germany) Erwin Weber	MON	SWE	POR; 7	KEN; Ret	FRA	GRE	USA	NZL	ARG	FIN	CIV	ITA	GBR	50th	4	11th	14
1989	Volkswagen Motorsport	Volkswagen Golf GTI 16V	(Sweden) Stig Blomqvist	SWE	MON	POR	KEN; 3	FRA	GRE	NZL	ARG	FIN	AUS	ITA	CIV	GBR	15th*	20*	9th	14
1989	Volkswagen Motorsport	Volkswagen Golf GTI 16V	(West Germany) Erwin Weber	SWE	MON	POR	KEN; 8	FRA	GRE	NZL	ARG	FIN	AUS	ITA	CIV	GBR	58th	3	9th	14
1990	Volkswagen Motorsport	Volkswagen Golf Rallye G60	(West Germany) Erwin Weber	MON	POR	KEN	FRA	GRE; Ret	NZL; 3	ARG	FIN	AUS; EX	ITA	CIV	GBR		18th	12	10th	10

*Including points scored with different manufacturers.

=== WRC era ===
Year	Entrant	Car	No.	Driver	1	2	3	4	5	6	7	8	9	10	11	12	13	14	WDC	Points	WMC	Points
2013	Volkswagen Motorsport	Volkswagen Polo R WRC	7	(Finland) Jari-Matti Latvala	MON; Ret	SWE; 4	MEX; 16	POR; 3	ARG; 3	GRE; 1	ITA; 3	FIN; 17	GER; 7	AUS; 4	FRA; 3	ESP; 2	GBR; 2		3rd	162	1st	425
2013	Volkswagen Motorsport	Volkswagen Polo R WRC	8	(France) Sébastien Ogier	MON; 2	SWE; 1	MEX; 1	POR; 1	ARG; 2	GRE; 10	ITA; 1	FIN; 1	GER; 17	AUS; 1	FRA; 1	ESP; 1	GBR; 1		1st	290	1st	425
2013	Volkswagen Motorsport II	Volkswagen Polo R WRC	9	(Norway) Andreas Mikkelsen				POR; 6	ARG; 8	GRE; 4	ITA; Ret	FIN; 10	GER; WD	AUS; 6	FRA; 7	ESP; Ret	GBR; 5		10th	50	7th	50
2014	Volkswagen Motorsport	Volkswagen Polo R WRC	1	(France) Sébastien Ogier	MON; 1	SWE; 6	MEX; 1	POR; 1	ARG; 2	ITA; 1	POL; 1	FIN; 2	GER; Ret	AUS; 1	FRA; 13	ESP; 1	GBR; 1		1st	267	1st	447
2014	Volkswagen Motorsport	Volkswagen Polo R WRC	2	(Finland) Jari-Matti Latvala	MON; 5	SWE; 1	MEX; 2	POR; 14	ARG; 1	ITA; 3	POL; 5	FIN; 1	GER; Ret	AUS; 2	FRA; 1	ESP; 2	GBR; 8		2nd	218	1st	447
2014	Volkswagen Motorsport II	Volkswagen Polo R WRC	9	(Norway) Andreas Mikkelsen	MON; 7	SWE; 2	MEX; 19	POR; 4	ARG; 4	ITA; 4	POL; 2	FIN; 4	GER; 3	AUS; 3	FRA; 2	ESP; 7	GBR; Ret		3rd	150	5th	133
2015	Volkswagen Motorsport	Volkswagen Polo R WRC	1	(France) Sébastien Ogier	MON; 1	SWE; 1	MEX; 1	ARG; 17	POR; 2	ITA; 1	POL; 1	FIN; 2	GER; 1	AUS; 1	FRA; 15	ESP; Ret	GBR; 1		1st	263	1st	413
2015	Volkswagen Motorsport	Volkswagen Polo R WRC	2	(Finland) Jari-Matti Latvala	MON; 2	SWE; Ret	MEX; 15	ARG; Ret	POR; 1	ITA; 6	POL; 5	FIN; 1	GER; 2	AUS; 2	FRA; 1	ESP; 2	GBR; 50		2nd	183	1st	413
2015	Volkswagen Motorsport II	Volkswagen Polo R WRC	9	(Norway) Andreas Mikkelsen	MON; 3	SWE; 3	MEX; 3	ARG; Ret	POR; 3	ITA; 36	POL; 2	FIN; Ret	GER; 3	AUS; 4	FRA; 3	ESP; 1	GBR; 3		3rd	171	5th	131
2016	Volkswagen Motorsport	Volkswagen Polo R WRC	1	(France) Sébastien Ogier	MON; 1	SWE; 1	MEX; 2	ARG; 2	POR; 3	ITA; 3	POL; 6	FIN; 24	GER; 1	CHN; C	FRA; 1	ESP; 1	GBR; 1	AUS; 2	1st	268	1st	355
2016	Volkswagen Motorsport	Volkswagen Polo R WRC	2	(Finland) Jari-Matti Latvala	MON; Ret	SWE; 26	MEX; 1	ARG; 16	POR; 6	ITA; 2	POL; 5	FIN; 2	GER; 48	CHN; C	FRA; 4	ESP; 14	GBR; 7	AUS; 9	6th	112	1st	355
2016	Volkswagen Motorsport II	Volkswagen Polo R WRC	9	(Norway) Andreas Mikkelsen	MON; 2	SWE; 4	MEX; Ret	ARG; 3	POR; 2	ITA; 13	POL; 1	FIN; 7	GER; 4	CHN; C	FRA; 3	ESP; Ret	GBR; 12	AUS; 1	3rd	154	3rd	163

=== S-WRC results ===
Year	Entrant	Car	Driver	1	2	3	4	5	6	7	8	9	10	11	12	13	WDC	Points
2011	Volkswagen Motorsport	Škoda Fabia S2000	(Finland) Joonas Lindroos	SWE	MEX	POR	JOR	ITA	ARG	GRE	FIN; Ret						-	0
2011	Volkswagen Motorsport	Škoda Fabia S2000	(Norway) Andreas Mikkelsen	SWE	MEX	POR	JOR	ITA	ARG	GRE	FIN; Ret						-	0
2011	Volkswagen Motorsport	Škoda Fabia S2000	(Netherlands) Hans Weijs, Jr.									GER; 13	AUS	FRA			-	0
2011	Volkswagen Motorsport	Škoda Fabia S2000	(Germany) Christian Riedemann									GER; 15	AUS	FRA	ESP; 20		-	0
2011	Volkswagen Motorsport	Škoda Fabia S2000	(Spain) Yeray Lemes												ESP; 14		-	0
2011	Volkswagen Motorsport	Škoda Fabia S2000	(Netherlands) Kevin Abbring													GBR; 12	-	0
2011	Volkswagen Motorsport	Škoda Fabia S2000	(Germany) Sepp Wiegand													GBR; Ret	-	0
2012	Volkswagen Motorsport	Škoda Fabia S2000	(France) Sébastien Ogier	MON; Ret	SWE; 11	MEX; 8	POR; 7	ARG; 7	GRE; 7	NZL	FIN; 10	GER; 6	GBR; 12	FRA; 11	ITA; 5	ESP; Ret	10th	41
2012	Volkswagen Motorsport	Škoda Fabia S2000	(Netherlands) Kevin Abbring	MON; 12		MEX; Ret	POR; DNS						GBR; 25				-	0
2012	Volkswagen Motorsport	Škoda Fabia S2000	(Norway) Andreas Mikkelsen		SWE; 13			ARG; Ret	GRE; Ret	NZL	FIN; 27	GER; 7		FRA; 12	ITA; 7	ESP; 21	14th	13
2012	Volkswagen Motorsport	Škoda Fabia S2000	(Germany) Sepp Wiegand									GER; Ret					-	0

=== J-WRC results ===
Year	Entrant	Car	No	Driver	1	2	3	4	5	6	7	JWRC	Points
2002	Volkswagen Racing	Volkswagen Polo S1600	69	(Finland) Kosti Katajamäki	MON; Ret	ESP; Ret	GRE; Ret	GER; 6	ITA; Ret	GBR; Ret		17th	1
2003	Volkswagen Racing	Volkswagen Polo S1600	54	(Finland) Kosti Katajamäki	MON; EX	TUR; 1	GRE; Ret	FIN; Ret	ITA; Ret	ESP; Ret	GBR; Ret	10th	10
2003	Volkswagen Racing	Volkswagen Polo S1600	62	(Sweden) Oscar Svedlund	MON; Ret	TUR; Ret	GRE; 5	FIN; 8	ITA	ESP; Ret	GBR; Ret	16th	5
2003	Volkswagen Racing	Volkswagen Polo S1600	78	(Germany) Vladan Vasiljevic	MON; DSQ	TUR; Ret	GRE; Ret	FIN; Ret	ITA	ESP	GBR	-	0
