= Brice Tirabassi =

French rally driver (born 1977)

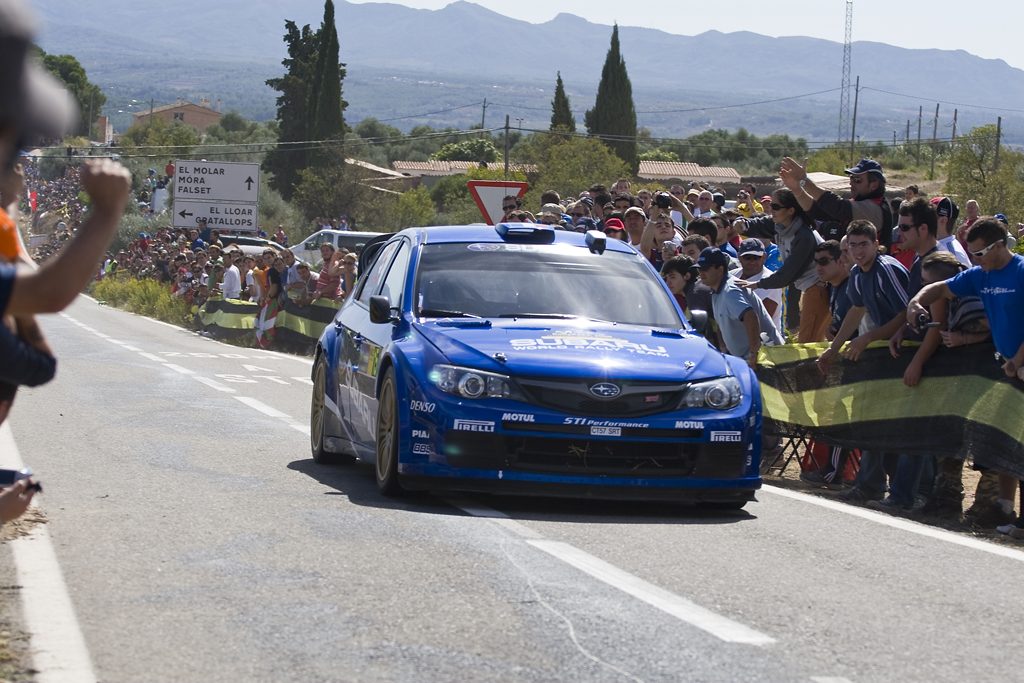
- Brice Tirabassi - 2008 Rally Catalunya

Personal information
- Nationality: (France) French
- Full name: Brice Pierre Tirabassi
- Born: June 15, 1977 (age 49)

World Rally Championship record
- Years active: 1999–2008
- Co-driver: (France) Delphine Bernardi (France) Sabrina De Castelli (France) Serge Le Gars (France) Jacques-Julien Renucci (France) Fabrice Gordon (France) Mathieu Baumel
- Teams: Subaru
- Rallies: 25
- Championships: 0
- Rally wins: 0
- Podiums: 0
- Stage wins: 0
- Total points: 0
- First rally: 1999 Tour de Corse
- Last rally: 2008 Tour de Corse

Brice Pierre Tirabassi (born 15 June 1977) is a French rally driver. He won the Junior World Rally Championship in 2003.

== Career ==
Tirabassi won the French Rally Championship in 2002, before stepping up to the Junior World Rally Championship (JWRC) in 2003. He won three out of seven rounds to take the crown. In 2005, he competed in the Production World Rally Championship. In 2006, he competed in four rounds of the JWRC in a PH Sport-prepared Citroën C2, winning in Corsica. In 2008, he competed in the Intercontinental Rally Challenge in a Peugeot 207 S2000, with a best results of 7th on Rally Russia. Towards the end of the year, he was called up by the Subaru World Rally Team to drive one of their new Subaru Impreza WRCs on the tarmac WRC rounds of Catalunya and Corsica. He finished 10th in Catalunya, but retired with engine failure in Corsica.

== Complete WRC results ==
Year	Entrant	Car	1	2	3	4	5	6	7	8	9	10	11	12	13	14	15	16	WDC	Points
1999	Brice Tirabassi	Peugeot 106 S16	MON	SWE	KEN	POR	ESP	FRA; Ret	ARG	GRE	NZL	FIN	CHN	ITA	AUS	GBR			NC	0
2000	Brice Tirabassi	Peugeot 306 Rallye	MON; 29	SWE	KEN	POR													-	0
2000	Brice Tirabassi	Peugeot 106 S16					ESP; Ret	ARG	GRE	NZL	FIN	CYP	FRA	ITA	AUS	GBR			-	0
2001	Equipe de France FFSA	Citroën Saxo Kit Car	MON	SWE	POR	ESP	ARG	CYP	GRC	KEN	FIN	NZL	ITA	FRA; Ret	AUS	GBR			NC	0
2002	Brice Tirabassi	Mitsubishi Lancer Evo VI	MON	SWE	FRA	ESP	CYP	ARG	GRE	KEN	FIN; Ret	GER	ITA	NZL	AUS	GBR			-	0
2003	Renault Sport	Renault Clio S1600	MON; 17	SWE	TUR; Ret	NZL	ARG	GRE; 17	CYP	GER	FIN; 20	AUS	ITA; Ret	FRA	ESP; 17	GBR; Ret			-	0
2004	Brice Tirabassi	Mitsubishi Lancer Evo VIII	MON	SWE	MEX	NZL	CYP	GRE	TUR	ARG	FIN	GER; Ret	JPN	GBR	ITA	FRA	ESP	AUS	-	0
2005	Brice Tirabassi	Subaru Impreza WRX STi	MON	SWE	MEX	NZL; 23	ITA	CYP; 12	TUR; 26	GRE	ARG; Ret	FIN	GER	GBR	JPN	FRA	ESP	AUS	-	0
2006	PH Sport	Citroën C2 S1600	MON	SWE	MEX	ESP; 30	FRA; 14	ARG	ITA; 27	GRE	GER; Ret	FIN	JPN	CYP	TUR	AUS	NZL	GBR	-	0
2007	Brice Tirabassi	Peugeot 207 S2000	MON	SWE	NOR	MEX	POR	ARG	ITA	GRE	FIN	GER	NZL	ESP	FRA; 12	JPN	IRE	GBR	-	0
2008	Subaru World Rally Team	Subaru Impreza WRC 08	MON	SWE	MEX	ARG	JOR	ITA	GRE	TUR	FIN	GER	NZL	ESP; 10	FRA; Ret	JPN	GBR		-	0

=== JWRC results ===
Year	Entrant	Car	1	2	3	4	5	6	7	8	9	Pos.	Points
2003	Brice Tirabassi	Renault Clio S1600	MON; 1	TUR; Ret	GRE; 1	FIN; 2	ITA; Ret	ESP; 1	GBR; Ret			1st	38
2006	PH Sport	Citroën C2 S1600	SWE	ESP; 9	FRA; 1	ARG	ITA; Ret	GER; Ret	FIN	TUR	GBR	14th	11

=== IRC results ===
Year	Entrant	Car	1	2	3	4	5	6	7	8	9	10	WDC	Points
2008	BSA	Peugeot 207 S2000	TUR; Ret	POR; Ret	BEL; Ret	RUS; 7	POR; Ret	CZE	ESP	ITA	SWI	CHI	27th	2

Sporting positions
Preceded by Daniel Solà	Junior World Rally Champion; 2003	Succeeded by Per-Gunnar Andersson
