= Kosti Katajamäki =

Finnish rally driver (born 1977)

Personal information
- Nationality: (Finland) Finnish
- Born: 26 February 1977 (age 49)

World Rally Championship record
- Years active: 2001–2006
- Co-driver: (Finland) Lasse Hirvijärvi (Finland) Jakke Honkanen (Finland) Miikka Anttila (Finland) Jani Laaksonen (Finland) Timo Alanne
- Teams: Stobart Ford
- Rallies: 35
- Championships: 0
- Rally wins: 0
- Podiums: 0
- Stage wins: 0
- Total points: 7
- First rally: 2001 Rally Finland
- Last rally: 2006 Rally of Turkey

Kosti Katajamäki (born 26 February 1977) is a rally driver from Finland.

== Career ==
Katajamäki made his rallying debut in 1997 in a Ford Escort RS2000. He won the Group N class of the Finnish Rally Championship in 2001 and the Group A class in 2005. His first World Rally Championship event was the 2001 Rally Finland, driving a Volkswagen Polo. He has competed sporadically in the WRC in recent years, driving a Suzuki Ignis S1600 and a Stobart M-Sport Ford Focus WRC. He is a protégé of double World Rally Champion Marcus Grönholm. In 2006, he scored his first points at the Rally Sweden while finishing sixth. His career best result came in his last event in the WRC when he finished fifth at the 2006 Rally of Turkey.

== Complete WRC results ==
Year	Entrant	Car	1	2	3	4	5	6	7	8	9	10	11	12	13	14	15	16	WDC	Points
2001	Volkswagen Racing	Volkswagen Polo S1600	MON	SWE	POR	ESP	ARG	CYP	GRE	KEN	FIN	NZL	ITA	FRA	AUS	GBR; Ret			NC	0
2002	Kosti Katajamäki	Volkswagen Polo S1600	MON; Ret	SWE	FRA	ESP; Ret	CYP	ARG	GRE; Ret	KEN	FIN	GER; 20	ITA; Ret	NZL	AUS	GBR; Ret			NC	0
2003	Kosti Katajamäki	Volkswagen Polo S1600	MON; EX	SWE	TUR; 15	NZL	ARG	GRE; Ret	CYP	GER	FIN; Ret	AUS	ITA; Ret	FRA	ESP; Ret	GBR; Ret			NC	0
2004	Kosti Katajamäki	Suzuki Ignis S1600	MON; Ret					GRE; Ret	TUR; 12	ARG	FIN; 17	GER	JPN	GBR; 21	ITA; 13	FRA	ESP; 23	AUS	NC	0
2004	Kosti Katajamäki	Mitsubishi Lancer Evo VII		SWE; Ret	MEX	NZL	CYP												NC	0
2005	Kosti Katajamäki	Suzuki Ignis S1600	MON; 12	SWE	MEX	NZL	ITA; Ret	CYP	TUR	GRE; 21	ARG	FIN; Ret	GER; 19	GBR	JPN	FRA; 17	ESP; 16	AUS	NC	0
2006	Stobart VK Ford Rally Team	Ford Focus RS WRC 04	MON	SWE; 6	MEX	ESP	FRA	ARG	ITA; Ret	GRE; 26	GER	FIN; 14	JPN	CYP	TUR; 5	AUS	NZL	GBR	14th	7

=== JWRC results ===
Year	Entrant	Car	1	2	3	4	5	6	7	8	JWRC	Points
2002	Kosti Katajamäki	Volkswagen Polo S1600	MON; Ret	ESP; Ret	GRE; Ret	GER; 6	ITA; Ret	GBR; Ret			17th	1
2003	Kosti Katajamäki	Volkswagen Polo S1600	MON; EX	TUR; 1	GRE; Ret	FIN; Ret	ITA; Ret	ESP; Ret	GBR; Ret		10th	10
2004	Kosti Katajamäki	Suzuki Ignis S1600	MON; Ret	GRE; Ret	TUR; 2	FIN; 2	GBR; 3	ITA; 4	ESP; 5		4th	31
2005	Kosti Katajamäki	Suzuki Ignis S1600	MON; 2	MEX	ITA; Ret	GRE; 4	FIN; Ret	GER; 5	FRA; 3	ESP; 2	5th	31
