= 2005 Cyprus Rally =

6th round of the 2005 World Rally Championship

2005 Cyprus Rally 33rd Cyprus Rally
Round 6 of the 2005 World Rally Championship season
← Previous event	Next event →
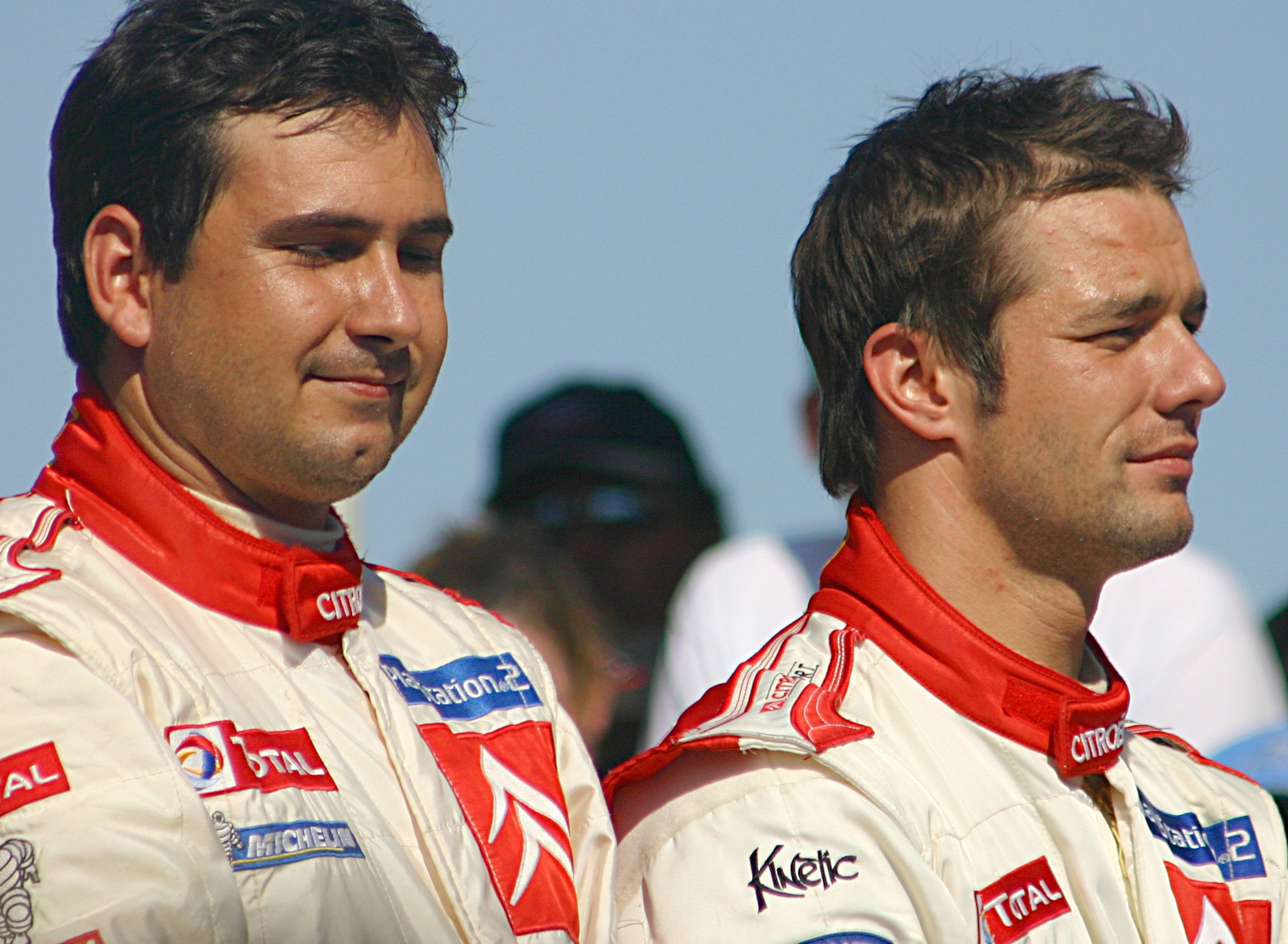
- Rally winning pair Sébastien Loeb and Daniel Elena on the podium.
- Host country: Cyprus
- Rally base: Limassol
- Dates run: May 13, 2005 – May 15, 2005
- Stages: 18 (326.68 km; 202.99 miles)
- Stage surface: Gravel
- Overall distance: 1,063.92 km (661.09 miles)

Statistics
- Crews: 52 at start, 39 at finish

Overall results
- Overall winner: (France) Sébastien Loeb (Monaco) Daniel Elena (France) Citroën Total WRT; Citroën Xsara WRC

The 2005 Cyprus Rally (formally the 33rd Cyprus Rally) was the sixth round of the 2005 World Rally Championship. The car rally was held over three days between 13 May and 15 May 2005, and was won by Citroën's Sébastien Loeb, his 14th win in the World Rally Championship and a third consecutive win in 2005.

== Background ==
=== Entry list ===
No.	Driver	Co-Driver	Entrant	Car	Tyre
World Rally Championship manufacturer entries
1	(France) Sébastien Loeb	(Monaco) Daniel Elena	(France) Citroën Total WRT	Citroën Xsara WRC	M
2	(Belgium) François Duval	(Belgium) Stéphane Prévot	(France) Citroën Total WRT	Citroën Xsara WRC	M
3	(Finland) Toni Gardemeister	(Finland) Jakke Honkanen	(United Kingdom) BP Ford World Rally Team	Ford Focus RS WRC '04	M
4	(Czech Republic) Roman Kresta	(Czech Republic) Jan Možný	(United Kingdom) BP Ford World Rally Team	Ford Focus RS WRC '04	M
5	(Norway) Petter Solberg	(United Kingdom) Phil Mills	(Japan) Subaru World Rally Team	Subaru Impreza S11 WRC '05	P
6	(Australia) Chris Atkinson	(Australia) Glenn Macneall	(Japan) Subaru World Rally Team	Subaru Impreza S11 WRC '05	P
7	(Finland) Marcus Grönholm	(Finland) Timo Rautiainen	(France) Marlboro Peugeot Total	Peugeot 307 WRC	P
8	(Estonia) Markko Märtin	(United Kingdom) Michael Park	(France) Marlboro Peugeot Total	Peugeot 307 WRC	P
9	(Finland) Harri Rovanperä	(Finland) Risto Pietiläinen	(Japan) Mitsubishi Motors	Mitsubishi Lancer WRC 05	P
10	(France) Gilles Panizzi	(France) Hervé Panizzi	(Japan) Mitsubishi Motors	Mitsubishi Lancer WRC 05	P
11	(Germany) Armin Schwarz	(Germany) Klaus Wicha	(Czech Republic) Škoda Motorsport	Škoda Fabia WRC	M
12	(Finland) Janne Tuohino	(Finland) Mikko Markkula	(Czech Republic) Škoda Motorsport	Škoda Fabia WRC	M
World Rally Championship entries
14	(Norway) Henning Solberg	(Norway) Cato Menkerud	(United Kingdom) BP Ford World Rally Team	Ford Focus RS WRC '04	M
15	(Germany) Antony Warmbold	(United Kingdom) Michael Orr	(United Kingdom) BP Ford World Rally Team	Ford Focus RS WRC '04	M
16	(Austria) Manfred Stohl	(Austria) Ilka Minor	(Belgium) OMV World Rally Team	Citroën Xsara WRC	M
17	(Sweden) Daniel Carlsson	(Sweden) Mattias Andersson	(France) Bozian Racing	Peugeot 206 WRC	P
18	(Hungary) Balázs Benik	(Hungary) Attila Vinoczai	(Hungary) Balázs Benik	Ford Focus WRC '02	—N/a
19	(Italy) Giovanni Recordati	(Monaco) Freddy Delorme	(Italy) Giovanni Recordati	Toyota Corolla WRC	M
PWRC entries
31	(Japan) Toshihiro Arai	(New Zealand) Tony Sircombe	(United Kingdom) Subaru Team Arai	Subaru Impreza STI N11	P
32	(Spain) Xavier Pons	(Spain) Oriol Julià Pascual	(Spain) Xavier Pons	Mitsubishi Lancer Evo VIII	M
33	(Qatar) Nasser Al-Attiyah	(United Kingdom) Chris Patterson	(Qatar) Nasser Al-Attiyah	Subaru Impreza STI N11 Spec C	P
34	(Japan) Fumio Nutahara	(Japan) Satoshi Hayashi	(Japan) Advan-Piaa Rally Team	Mitsubishi Lancer Evo VIII	Y
35	(Malaysia) Karamjit Singh	(United Kingdom) John Bennie	Proton Pert Malaysia	Proton Pert Evo VII	—N/a
36	(Argentina) Marcos Ligato	(Argentina) Rubén García	Subaru Argentina Rally Team	Subaru Impreza STI N11	—N/a
37	(United Kingdom) Mark Higgins	(United Kingdom) Trevor Agnew	(United Kingdom) Mark Higgins	Subaru Impreza STI N11 Spec C	P
38	(Italy) Fabio Frisiero	(Italy) Giovanni Agnese	(Italy) Fabio Frisiero	Subaru Impreza STI N11 Spec C	P
40	(Argentina) Gabriel Pozzo	(Argentina) Daniel Stillo	Subaru Argentina Rally Team	Subaru Impreza STI N11 Spec C	P
41	(United Kingdom) Natalie Barratt	(United Kingdom) Carl Williamson	(Belgium) OMV World Rally Team	Mitsubishi Lancer Evo VIII	P
42	(Argentina) Federico Villagra	(Argentina) Javier Villagra	(Argentina) Federico Villagra	Mitsubishi Lancer Evo VIII	S
44	(Argentina) Sebastián Beltrán	(Argentina) Edgardo Galindo	Subaru Argentina Rally Team	Subaru Impreza STI N11 Spec C	P
45	(Italy) Riccardo Errani	(Italy) Stefano Casadio	(Italy) Riccardo Errani	Mitsubishi Lancer Evo VIII	P
48	(Chile) Luis Ignacio Rosselot	(Chile) Ricardo Rojas	(Chile) Luis Ignacio Rosselot	Mitsubishi Lancer Evo VIII	—N/a
49	(Oman) Hamed Al-Wahaibi	(United Kingdom) David Senior	Oman Arab World Rally Team	Subaru Impreza STI	—N/a
51	(France) Brice Tirabassi	(France) Mathieu Baumel	(France) Brice Tirabassi	Subaru Impreza STI N11 Spec C	P

=== Itinerary ===
All dates and times are EEST (UTC+3).

Date	Time	No.	Stage name	Distance
1. leg — 121.78 km
13 May	09:38	SS1	Lagoudera 1	38.32 km
13 May	10:46	SS2	Kourdali 1	15.00 km
13 May	11:24	SS3	Asinou 1	7.57 km
13 May	14:37	SS4	Lagoudera 2	38.32 km
13 May	15:45	SS5	Kourdali 2	15.00 km
13 May	16:23	SS6	Asinou 2	7.57 km
2. leg — 109.56 km
14 May	08:48	SS7	Platres 1	11.12 km
14 May	09:31	SS8	Foini 1	30.33 km
14 May	10:29	SS9	Galatareia 1	13.33 km
14 May	13:52	SS10	Platres 2	11.12 km
14 May	14:35	SS11	Foini 2	30.33 km
14 May	15:33	SS12	Galatareia 2	13.33 km
3. leg — 95.34 km
15 May	07:18	SS13	Vavatsinia 1	25.24 km
15 May	08:16	SS14	Macheras 1	12.94 km
15 May	09:04	SS15	Kellaki 1	9.49 km
15 May	11:52	SS16	Vavatsinia 2	25.24 km
15 May	12:50	SS17	Macheras 2	12.94 km
15 May	13:38	SS18	Kellaki 2	9.49 km

== Results ==
=== Overall ===
Pos.	No.	Driver	Co-driver	Team	Car	Time	Difference	Points
1	1	(France) Sébastien Loeb	(Monaco) Daniel Elena	(France) Citroën Total WRT	Citroën Xsara WRC	5:02:29.4		10
2	16	(Austria) Manfred Stohl	(Austria) Ilka Minor	(Belgium) OMV World Rally Team	Citroën Xsara WRC	5:06:38.9	+4:09.5	8
3	8	(Estonia) Markko Märtin	(United Kingdom) Michael Park	(France) Marlboro Peugeot Total	Peugeot 307 WRC	5:07:11.3	+4:41.9	6
4	14	(Norway) Henning Solberg	(Norway) Cato Menkerud	(United Kingdom) BP Ford World Rally Team	Ford Focus RS WRC '04	5:07:45.1	+5:15.7	5
5	3	(Finland) Toni Gardemeister	(Finland) Jakke Honkanen	(United Kingdom) BP Ford World Rally Team	Ford Focus RS WRC '04	5:10:06.7	+7:37.3	4
6	4	(Czech Republic) Roman Kresta	(Czech Republic) Jan Možný	(United Kingdom) BP Ford World Rally Team	Ford Focus RS WRC '04	5:12:46.8	+10:17.4	3
7	9	(Finland) Harri Rovanperä	(Finland) Risto Pietiläinen	(Japan) Mitsubishi Motors	Mitsubishi Lancer WRC 05	5:14:48.1	+12:18.7	2
8	17	(Sweden) Daniel Carlsson	(Sweden) Mattias Andersson	(France) Bozian Racing	Peugeot 206 WRC	5:18:32.6	+16:03.2	1

=== World Rally Cars ===
==== Classification ====
Position		No.	Driver	Co-driver	Entrant	Car	Time	Difference	Points
Event	Class	No.	Driver	Co-driver	Entrant	Car	Time	Difference	Points
1	1	1	(France) Sébastien Loeb	(Monaco) Daniel Elena	(France) Citroën Total WRT	Citroën Xsara WRC	5:02:29.4		10
3	2	8	(Estonia) Markko Märtin	(United Kingdom) Michael Park	(France) Marlboro Peugeot Total	Peugeot 307 WRC	5:07:11.3	+4:41.9	6
5	3	3	(Finland) Toni Gardemeister	(Finland) Jakke Honkanen	(United Kingdom) BP Ford World Rally Team	Ford Focus RS WRC '04	5:10:06.7	+7:37.3	4
6	4	4	(Czech Republic) Roman Kresta	(Czech Republic) Jan Možný	(United Kingdom) BP Ford World Rally Team	Ford Focus RS WRC '04	5:12:46.8	+10:17.4	3
7	5	9	(Finland) Harri Rovanperä	(Finland) Risto Pietiläinen	(Japan) Mitsubishi Motors	Mitsubishi Lancer WRC 05	5:14:48.1	+12:18.7	2
9	6	12	(Finland) Janne Tuohino	(Finland) Mikko Markkula	(Czech Republic) Škoda Motorsport	Škoda Fabia WRC	5:19:15.7	+16:46.3	0
10	7	6	(Australia) Chris Atkinson	(Australia) Glenn Macneall	(Japan) Subaru World Rally Team	Subaru Impreza S11 WRC '05	5:29:30.9	+27:01.5	0
11	8	10	(France) Gilles Panizzi	(France) Hervé Panizzi	(Japan) Mitsubishi Motors	Mitsubishi Lancer WRC 05	5:34:09.8	+31:40.4	0
13	9	11	(Germany) Armin Schwarz	(Germany) Klaus Wicha	(Czech Republic) Škoda Motorsport	Škoda Fabia WRC	5:37:02.6	+34:33.2	0
Retired SS11		2	(Belgium) François Duval	(Belgium) Stéphane Prévot	(France) Citroën Total WRT	Citroën Xsara WRC	Fire		0
Retired SS7		5	(Norway) Petter Solberg	(United Kingdom) Phil Mills	(Japan) Subaru World Rally Team	Subaru Impreza S11 WRC '05	Electrical		0
Retired SS7		7	(Finland) Marcus Grönholm	(Finland) Timo Rautiainen	(France) Marlboro Peugeot Total	Peugeot 307 WRC	Mechanical		0

==== Special stages ====
Day	Stage	Stage name	Length	Winner	Car	Time	Class leaders
1. leg (13 May)	SS1	Lagoudera 1	38.32 km	(Norway) Petter Solberg	Subaru Impreza S11 WRC '05	36:58.9	(Norway) Petter Solberg
1. leg (13 May)	SS2	Kourdali 1	15.00 km	(France) Sébastien Loeb	Citroën Xsara WRC	16:29.3	(France) Sébastien Loeb
1. leg (13 May)	SS3	Asinou 1	7.57 km	(France) Sébastien Loeb	Citroën Xsara WRC	7:41.7	(France) Sébastien Loeb
1. leg (13 May)	SS4	Lagoudera 2	38.32 km	(France) Sébastien Loeb	Citroën Xsara WRC	35:56.8	(France) Sébastien Loeb
1. leg (13 May)	SS5	Kourdali 2	15.00 km	(France) Sébastien Loeb	Citroën Xsara WRC	16:28.3	(France) Sébastien Loeb
1. leg (13 May)	SS6	Asinou 2	7.57 km	(France) Sébastien Loeb	Citroën Xsara WRC	7:33.1	(France) Sébastien Loeb
2. leg (14 May)	SS7	Platres 1	11.12 km	(France) Sébastien Loeb	Citroën Xsara WRC	9:11.2	(France) Sébastien Loeb
2. leg (14 May)	SS8	Foini 1	30.33 km	(France) Sébastien Loeb	Citroën Xsara WRC	27:31.4	(France) Sébastien Loeb
2. leg (14 May)	SS9	Galatareia 1	13.33 km	(France) Sébastien Loeb	Citroën Xsara WRC	10:47.0	(France) Sébastien Loeb
2. leg (14 May)	SS10	Platres 2	11.12 km	(France) Sébastien Loeb	Citroën Xsara WRC	8:58.0	(France) Sébastien Loeb
2. leg (14 May)	SS11	Foini 2	30.33 km	(France) Sébastien Loeb (Finland) Toni Gardemeister	Citroën Xsara WRC; Ford Focus RS WRC '04	27:05.8	(France) Sébastien Loeb
2. leg (14 May)	SS12	Galatareia 2	13.33 km	(France) Sébastien Loeb (France) Gilles Panizzi	Citroën Xsara WRC; Mitsubishi Lancer WRC 05	10:49.7	(France) Sébastien Loeb
3. leg (15 May)	SS13	Vavatsinia 1	25.24 km	(France) Sébastien Loeb	Citroën Xsara WRC	23:31.3	(France) Sébastien Loeb
3. leg (15 May)	SS14	Macheras 1	12.94 km	(France) Sébastien Loeb	Citroën Xsara WRC	11:33.8	(France) Sébastien Loeb
3. leg (15 May)	SS15	Kellaki 1	9.49 km	(France) Sébastien Loeb	Citroën Xsara WRC	8:26.5	(France) Sébastien Loeb
3. leg (15 May)	SS16	Vavatsinia 2	25.24 km	(Finland) Toni Gardemeister	Ford Focus RS WRC '04	23:17.7	(France) Sébastien Loeb
3. leg (15 May)	SS17	Macheras 2	12.94 km	(Estonia) Markko Märtin	Peugeot 307 WRC	11:19.3	(France) Sébastien Loeb
3. leg (15 May)	SS18	Kellaki 2	9.49 km	(Finland) Toni Gardemeister	Ford Focus RS WRC '04	8:30.5	(France) Sébastien Loeb

==== Championship standings ====
Pos.	Drivers' championships			Co-drivers' championships			Manufacturers' championships		
Pos.	Move	Driver	Points	Move	Co-driver	Points	Move	Manufacturer	Points
1		(France) Sébastien Loeb	45		(Monaco) Daniel Elena	45		(France) Marlboro Peugeot Total	62
2		(Norway) Petter Solberg	34		(United Kingdom) Phil Mills	34		(France) Citroën Total WRT	53
3		(Estonia) Markko Märtin	34		(United Kingdom) Michael Park	34	1	(United Kingdom) BP Ford World Rally Team	44
4	1	(Finland) Toni Gardemeister	28	1	(Finland) Jakke Honkanen	28	1	(Japan) Subaru World Rally Team	38
5	1	(Finland) Marcus Grönholm	26	1	(Finland) Timo Rautiainen	26		(Japan) Mitsubishi Motors	29

=== Production World Rally Championship ===
==== Classification ====
Position		No.	Driver	Co-driver	Entrant	Car	Time	Difference	Points
Event	Class	No.	Driver	Co-driver	Entrant	Car	Time	Difference	Points
1	1	51	(France) Brice Tirabassi	(France) Mathieu Baumel	(France) Brice Tirabassi	Subaru Impreza STI N11 Spec C	5:34:38.2		10
2	2	44	(Argentina) Sebastián Beltrán	(Argentina) Edgardo Galindo	Subaru Argentina Rally Team	Subaru Impreza STI N11 Spec C	5:39:04.1	+4:25.9	8
3	3	36	(Argentina) Marcos Ligato	(Argentina) Rubén García	Subaru Argentina Rally Team	Subaru Impreza STI N11	5:41:51.1	+7:12.9	6
4	4	40	(Argentina) Gabriel Pozzo	(Argentina) Daniel Stillo	Subaru Argentina Rally Team	Subaru Impreza STI N11 Spec C	5:42:02.2	+7:24.0	5
5	5	33	(Qatar) Nasser Al-Attiyah	(United Kingdom) Chris Patterson	(Qatar) Nasser Al-Attiyah	Subaru Impreza STI N11 Spec C	5:42:56.5	+8:18.3	4
6	6	34	(Japan) Fumio Nutahara	(Japan) Satoshi Hayashi	(Japan) Advan-Piaa Rally Team	Mitsubishi Lancer Evo VIII	5:48:59.8	+14:21.6	3
7	7	31	(Japan) Toshihiro Arai	(New Zealand) Tony Sircombe	(United Kingdom) Subaru Team Arai	Subaru Impreza STI N11	5:49:06.9	+14:28.7	2
8	8	42	(Argentina) Federico Villagra	(Argentina) Javier Villagra	(Argentina) Federico Villagra	Mitsubishi Lancer Evo VIII	6:01:30.0	+26:51.8	1
9	9	45	(Italy) Riccardo Errani	(Italy) Stefano Casadio	(Italy) Riccardo Errani	Mitsubishi Lancer Evo VIII	6:05:37.7	+30:59.5	0
10	10	32	(Spain) Xavier Pons	(Spain) Oriol Julià Pascual	(Spain) Xavier Pons	Mitsubishi Lancer Evo VIII	6:26:36.9	+51:58.7	0
Retired SS16		38	(Italy) Fabio Frisiero	(Italy) Giovanni Agnese	(Italy) Fabio Frisiero	Subaru Impreza STI N11 Spec C	Mechanical		0
Retired SS16		41	(United Kingdom) Natalie Barratt	(United Kingdom) Carl Williamson	(Belgium) OMV World Rally Team	Mitsubishi Lancer Evo VIII	Accident		0
Retired SS16		49	(Oman) Hamed Al-Wahaibi	(United Kingdom) David Senior	Oman Arab World Rally Team	Subaru Impreza STI	Steering		0
Retired SS15		35	(Malaysia) Karamjit Singh	(United Kingdom) John Bennie	Proton Pert Malaysia	Proton Pert Evo VII	Accident		0
Retired SS4		37	(United Kingdom) Mark Higgins	(United Kingdom) Trevor Agnew	(United Kingdom) Mark Higgins	Subaru Impreza STI N11 Spec C	Fire		0
Retired SS1		48	(Chile) Luis Ignacio Rosselot	(Chile) Ricardo Rojas	(Chile) Luis Ignacio Rosselot	Mitsubishi Lancer Evo VIII	Engine		0

==== Special stages ====
Day	Stage	Stage name	Length	Winner	Car	Time	Class leaders
1. leg (13 May)	SS1	Lagoudera 1	38.32 km	(United Kingdom) Mark Higgins	Subaru Impreza STI N11 Spec C	39:06.6	(United Kingdom) Mark Higgins
1. leg (13 May)	SS2	Kourdali 1	15.00 km	(Argentina) Gabriel Pozzo	Subaru Impreza STI N11 Spec C	17:32.6	(United Kingdom) Mark Higgins
1. leg (13 May)	SS3	Asinou 1	7.57 km	(Argentina) Gabriel Pozzo	Subaru Impreza STI N11 Spec C	8:02.7	(United Kingdom) Mark Higgins
1. leg (13 May)	SS4	Lagoudera 2	38.32 km	(France) Brice Tirabassi	Subaru Impreza STI N11 Spec C	40:19.2	(France) Brice Tirabassi
1. leg (13 May)	SS5	Kourdali 2	15.00 km	(Argentina) Federico Villagra	Mitsubishi Lancer Evo VIII	18:14.4	(France) Brice Tirabassi
1. leg (13 May)	SS6	Asinou 2	7.57 km	(Japan) Fumio Nutahara	Mitsubishi Lancer Evo VIII	8:24.4	(France) Brice Tirabassi
2. leg (14 May)	SS7	Platres 1	11.12 km	(Japan) Toshihiro Arai	Subaru Impreza STI N11	9:41.4	(France) Brice Tirabassi
2. leg (14 May)	SS8	Foini 1	30.33 km	(Argentina) Gabriel Pozzo	Subaru Impreza STI N11 Spec C	28:54.2	(France) Brice Tirabassi
2. leg (14 May)	SS9	Galatareia 1	13.33 km	(Argentina) Gabriel Pozzo	Subaru Impreza STI N11 Spec C	11:28.5	(France) Brice Tirabassi
2. leg (14 May)	SS10	Platres 2	11.12 km	(Argentina) Gabriel Pozzo	Subaru Impreza STI N11 Spec C	9:33.6	(France) Brice Tirabassi
2. leg (14 May)	SS11	Foini 2	30.33 km	Notional stage time			(France) Brice Tirabassi
2. leg (14 May)	SS12	Galatareia 2	13.33 km	Notional stage time			(France) Brice Tirabassi
3. leg (15 May)	SS13	Vavatsinia 1	25.24 km	(Argentina) Gabriel Pozzo	Subaru Impreza STI N11 Spec C	24:40.0	(France) Brice Tirabassi
3. leg (15 May)	SS14	Macheras 1	12.94 km	(Japan) Toshihiro Arai	Subaru Impreza STI N11	11:57.4	(France) Brice Tirabassi
3. leg (15 May)	SS15	Kellaki 1	9.49 km	(Spain) Xavier Pons	Mitsubishi Lancer Evo VIII	8:51.4	(France) Brice Tirabassi
3. leg (15 May)	SS16	Vavatsinia 2	25.24 km	(Japan) Toshihiro Arai	Subaru Impreza STI N11	24:35.0	(France) Brice Tirabassi
3. leg (15 May)	SS17	Macheras 2	12.94 km	(Japan) Toshihiro Arai	Subaru Impreza STI N11	11:51.1	(France) Brice Tirabassi
3. leg (15 May)	SS18	Kellaki 2	9.49 km	(Japan) Toshihiro Arai	Subaru Impreza STI N11	8:52.9	(France) Brice Tirabassi

==== Championship standings ====
Pos.	Drivers' championships		
Pos.	Move	Driver	Points
1		(Japan) Toshihiro Arai	20
2		(Spain) Xavier Pons	15
3	2	(Argentina) Marcos Ligato	12
4	8	(France) Brice Tirabassi	10
5	2	(Qatar) Nasser Al-Attiyah	9
