= 2003 Rally Catalunya =

13th round of the 2003 World Rally Championship

2003 Rally Catalunya 39th Rallye Catalunya - Costa Brava
Round 13 of the 2003 World Rally Championship season
← Previous event	Next event →
- Host country: Spain
- Rally base: Lloret de Mar
- Dates run: October 24, 2003 – October 26, 2003
- Stages: 22 (381.18 km; 236.85 miles)
- Stage surface: Asphalt
- Overall distance: 1,553.72 km (965.44 miles)

Statistics
- Crews: 47 at start, 33 at finish

Overall results
- Overall winner: (France) Gilles Panizzi (France) Hervé Panizzi (France) Marlboro Peugeot Total; Peugeot 206 WRC

The 2003 Rally Catalunya (formally the 39th Rallye Catalunya - Costa Brava) was the thirteenth round of the 2003 World Rally Championship. The race was held over three days between 24 October and 26 October 2003, and was based in Lloret de Mar, Spain. Peugeot's Gilles Panizzi won the race, his 7th win in the World Rally Championship.

== Background ==
=== Entry list ===
No.	Driver	Co-Driver	Entrant	Car	Tyre
World Rally Championship manufacturer entries
1	(Finland) Marcus Grönholm	(Finland) Timo Rautiainen	(France) Marlboro Peugeot Total	Peugeot 206 WRC	MI
2	(United Kingdom) Richard Burns	(United Kingdom) Robert Reid	(France) Marlboro Peugeot Total	Peugeot 206 WRC	MI
3	(France) Gilles Panizzi	(France) Hervé Panizzi	(France) Marlboro Peugeot Total	Peugeot 206 WRC	MI
4	(Estonia) Markko Märtin	(United Kingdom) Michael Park	(United Kingdom) Ford Motor Co. Ltd.	Ford Focus RS WRC '03	MI
5	(Belgium) François Duval	(Belgium) Stéphane Prévot	(United Kingdom) Ford Motor Co. Ltd.	Ford Focus RS WRC '03	MI
6	(Finland) Mikko Hirvonen	(Finland) Jarmo Lehtinen	(United Kingdom) Ford Motor Co. Ltd.	Ford Focus RS WRC '02	MI
7	(Norway) Petter Solberg	(United Kingdom) Phil Mills	(Japan) 555 Subaru World Rally Team	Subaru Impreza S9 WRC '03	P
8	(Finland) Tommi Mäkinen	(Finland) Kaj Lindström	(Japan) 555 Subaru World Rally Team	Subaru Impreza S9 WRC '03	P
14	(France) Didier Auriol	(France) Denis Giraudet	(Czech Republic) Škoda Motorsport	Škoda Fabia WRC	MI
15	(Finland) Toni Gardemeister	(Finland) Paavo Lukander	(Czech Republic) Škoda Motorsport	Škoda Fabia WRC	MI
17	(United Kingdom) Colin McRae	(United Kingdom) Derek Ringer	(France) Citroën Total WRT	Citroën Xsara WRC	MI
18	(France) Sébastien Loeb	(Monaco) Daniel Elena	(France) Citroën Total WRT	Citroën Xsara WRC	MI
19	(Spain) Carlos Sainz	(Spain) Marc Martí	(France) Citroën Total WRT	Citroën Xsara WRC	MI
20	(France) Philippe Bugalski	(France) Jean-Paul Chiaroni	(France) Citroën Total WRT	Citroën Xsara WRC	MI
World Rally Championship entries
21	(France) Cédric Robert	(France) Gérald Bedon	Equipe de France FFSA	Peugeot 206 WRC	MI
22	(Czech Republic) Roman Kresta	(Czech Republic) Jan Tománek	(France) Bozian Racing	Peugeot 206 WRC	MI
23	(Germany) Antony Warmbold	(United Kingdom) Gemma Price	(Germany) AW Rally Team	Ford Focus RS WRC '02	MI
33	(United Kingdom) Alistair Ginley	(Republic of Ireland) Rory Kennedy	(United Kingdom) Alistair Ginley	Ford Focus RS WRC '01	—N/a
JWRC entries
51	(San Marino) Mirco Baldacci	(Italy) Giovanni Bernacchini	(Italy) Purity Auto	Fiat Punto S1600	MI
52	(Sweden) Daniel Carlsson	(Sweden) Matthias Andersson	(Japan) Suzuki Sport	Suzuki Ignis S1600	MI
54	(Finland) Kosti Katajamäki	(Finland) Jani Laaksonen	(Germany) Volkswagen Racing	Volkswagen Polo S1600	MI
57	(Bulgaria) Dimitar Iliev	(Bulgaria) Yanaki Yanakiev	(Italy) Auto Sport Italia	Peugeot 206 S1600	MI
61	(France) Brice Tirabassi	(France) Jacques-Julien Renucci	(France) Renault Sport	Renault Clio S1600	MI
62	(Sweden) Oscar Svedlund	(Sweden) Björn Nilsson	(Germany) Volkswagen Racing	Volkswagen Polo S1600	MI
63	(Italy) Massimo Ceccato	(Italy) Mitia Dotta	(Italy) Top Run SRL	Fiat Punto S1600	MI
64	(Finland) Ville-Pertti Teuronen	(Finland) Mikko Markkula	(Japan) Suzuki Sport	Suzuki Ignis S1600	MI
65	(Lebanon) Abdo Feghali	(Lebanon) Joseph Matar	(Italy) Astra Racing	Ford Puma S1600	MI
67	(San Marino) Alessandro Broccoli	(Italy) Giovanni Agnese	(San Marino) Sab Motorsport	Opel Corsa S1600	MI
69	(Spain) Salvador Cañellas Jr.	(Spain) Xavier Amigó	(Japan) Suzuki Sport	Suzuki Ignis S1600	MI
70	(United Kingdom) Guy Wilks	(United Kingdom) Phil Pugh	(United Kingdom) Ford Motor Co. Ltd.	Ford Puma S1600	MI
71	(Estonia) Urmo Aava	(Estonia) Kuldar Sikk	(Japan) Suzuki Sport	Suzuki Ignis S1600	MI
73	(Bulgaria) Krum Donchev	(Bulgaria) Ruman Manolov	(Italy) Auto Sport Italia	Peugeot 206 S1600	MI
74	(United Kingdom) Kris Meeke	(United Kingdom) Chris Patterson	(Germany) Opel Motorsport	Opel Corsa S1600	MI
76	(Italy) Luca Cecchettini	(Italy) Marco Muzzarelli	(Italy) Top Run SRL	Fiat Punto S1600	MI

=== Itinerary ===
All dates and times are CEST (UTC+2) from 24 to 25 October 2003 and CET (UTC+1) on 26 October 2003.

Date	Time	No.	Stage name	Distance
Leg 1 — 146.36 km
24 October	08:48	SS1	La Trona 1	13.17 km
24 October	09:21	SS2	Alpens — Les Llosses 1	21.80 km
24 October	10:29	SS3	La Pobla de Lillet 1	22.55 km
24 October	13:12	SS4	Sant Julià 1	26.27 km
24 October	14:05	SS5	Taradell 1	5.05 km
24 October	15:32	SS6	La Trona 2	13.17 km
24 October	16:05	SS7	Alpens — Les Llosses 2	21.80 km
24 October	17:13	SS8	La Pobla de Lillet 2	22.55 km
Leg 2 — 131.26 km
25 October	08:53	SS9	Olost 1	23.08 km
25 October	09:41	SS10	Lluçà 1	14.04 km
25 October	10:09	SS11	Sant Boi de Lluçanès 1	12.85 km
25 October	11:42	SS12	Sant Julià 2	26.27 km
25 October	12:35	SS13	Taradell 2	5.05 km
25 October	14:12	SS14	Olost 2	23.08 km
25 October	15:00	SS15	Lluçà 2	14.04 km
25 October	15:28	SS16	Sant Boi de Lluçanès 2	12.85 km
Leg 3 — 103.56 km
26 October	07:43	SS17	Sant Bartomeu del Grau 1	11.55 km
26 October	08:19	SS18	La Roca 1	5.05 km
26 October	08:47	SS19	Viladrau 1	35.18 km
26 October	11:10	SS20	Sant Bartomeu del Grau 2	11.55 km
26 October	11:46	SS21	La Roca 2	5.05 km
26 October	12:14	SS22	Viladrau 2	35.18 km

== Results ==
=== Overall ===
Pos.	No.	Driver	Co-driver	Team	Car	Time	Difference	Points
1	3	(France) Gilles Panizzi	(France) Hervé Panizzi	(France) Marlboro Peugeot Total	Peugeot 206 WRC	3:55:09.4		10
2	18	(France) Sébastien Loeb	(Monaco) Daniel Elena	(France) Citroën Total WRT	Citroën Xsara WRC	3:55:22.4	+13.0	8
3	4	(Estonia) Markko Märtin	(United Kingdom) Michael Park	(United Kingdom) Ford Motor Co. Ltd.	Ford Focus RS WRC '03	3:55:23.0	+13.6	6
4	5	(Belgium) François Duval	(Belgium) Stéphane Prévot	(United Kingdom) Ford Motor Co. Ltd.	Ford Focus RS WRC '03	3:56:04.8	+55.4	5
5	7	(Norway) Petter Solberg	(United Kingdom) Phil Mills	(Japan) 555 Subaru World Rally Team	Subaru Impreza S9 WRC '03	3:56:20.2	+1:10.8	4
6	1	(Finland) Marcus Grönholm	(Finland) Timo Rautiainen	(France) Marlboro Peugeot Total	Peugeot 206 WRC	3:56:38.5	+1:29.1	3
7	19	(Spain) Carlos Sainz	(Spain) Marc Martí	(France) Citroën Total WRT	Citroën Xsara WRC	3:56:52.4	+1:43.0	2
8	8	(Finland) Tommi Mäkinen	(Finland) Kaj Lindström	(Japan) 555 Subaru World Rally Team	Subaru Impreza S9 WRC '03	3:57:04.5	+1:55.1	1

=== World Rally Cars ===
==== Classification ====
Position		No.	Driver	Co-driver	Entrant	Car	Time	Difference	Points
Event	Class	No.	Driver	Co-driver	Entrant	Car	Time	Difference	Points
1	1	3	(France) Gilles Panizzi	(France) Hervé Panizzi	(France) Marlboro Peugeot Total	Peugeot 206 WRC	3:55:09.4		10
2	2	18	(France) Sébastien Loeb	(Monaco) Daniel Elena	(France) Citroën Total WRT	Citroën Xsara WRC	3:55:22.4	+13.0	8
3	3	4	(Estonia) Markko Märtin	(United Kingdom) Michael Park	(United Kingdom) Ford Motor Co. Ltd.	Ford Focus RS WRC '03	3:55:23.0	+13.6	6
4	4	5	(Belgium) François Duval	(Belgium) Stéphane Prévot	(United Kingdom) Ford Motor Co. Ltd.	Ford Focus RS WRC '03	3:56:04.8	+55.4	5
5	5	7	(Norway) Petter Solberg	(United Kingdom) Phil Mills	(Japan) 555 Subaru World Rally Team	Subaru Impreza S9 WRC '03	3:56:20.2	+1:10.8	4
6	6	1	(Finland) Marcus Grönholm	(Finland) Timo Rautiainen	(France) Marlboro Peugeot Total	Peugeot 206 WRC	3:56:38.5	+1:29.1	3
7	7	19	(Spain) Carlos Sainz	(Spain) Marc Martí	(France) Citroën Total WRT	Citroën Xsara WRC	3:56:52.4	+1:43.0	2
8	8	8	(Finland) Tommi Mäkinen	(Finland) Kaj Lindström	(Japan) 555 Subaru World Rally Team	Subaru Impreza S9 WRC '03	3:57:04.5	+1:55.1	1
9	9	17	(United Kingdom) Colin McRae	(United Kingdom) Derek Ringer	(France) Citroën Total WRT	Citroën Xsara WRC	3:58:24.6	+3:15.2	0
10	10	20	(France) Philippe Bugalski	(France) Jean-Paul Chiaroni	(France) Citroën Total WRT	Citroën Xsara WRC	4:00:23.0	+5:13.6	0
12	11	15	(Finland) Toni Gardemeister	(Finland) Paavo Lukander	(Czech Republic) Škoda Motorsport	Škoda Fabia WRC	4:01:07.6	+5:58.2	0
14	12	6	(Finland) Mikko Hirvonen	(Finland) Jarmo Lehtinen	(United Kingdom) Ford Motor Co. Ltd.	Ford Focus RS WRC '02	4:04:15.3	+9:05.9	0
Retired SS19		2	(United Kingdom) Richard Burns	(United Kingdom) Robert Reid	(France) Marlboro Peugeot Total	Peugeot 206 WRC	Accident		0
Retired SS9		14	(France) Didier Auriol	(France) Denis Giraudet	(Czech Republic) Škoda Motorsport	Škoda Fabia WRC	Clutch		0

==== Special stages ====
Day	Stage	Stage name	Length	Winner	Car	Time	Class leaders
Leg 1 (24 Oct)	SS1	La Trona 1	13.17 km	(Norway) Petter Solberg	Subaru Impreza S9 WRC '03	8:23.6	(Norway) Petter Solberg
Leg 1 (24 Oct)	SS2	Alpens — Les Llosses 1	21.80 km	(France) Sébastien Loeb	Citroën Xsara WRC	13:07.3	(France) Sébastien Loeb
Leg 1 (24 Oct)	SS3	La Pobla de Lillet 1	22.55 km	(France) Sébastien Loeb	Citroën Xsara WRC	15:03.5	(France) Sébastien Loeb
Leg 1 (24 Oct)	SS4	Sant Julià 1	26.27 km	(France) Sébastien Loeb	Citroën Xsara WRC	15:35.3	(France) Sébastien Loeb
Leg 1 (24 Oct)	SS5	Taradell 1	5.05 km	(Estonia) Markko Märtin	Ford Focus RS WRC '03	2:56.2	(France) Sébastien Loeb
Leg 1 (24 Oct)	SS6	La Trona 2	13.17 km	(France) Gilles Panizzi	Peugeot 206 WRC	8:15.7	(France) Sébastien Loeb
Leg 1 (24 Oct)	SS7	Alpens — Les Llosses 2	21.80 km	(France) Gilles Panizzi	Peugeot 206 WRC	13:10.6	(France) Sébastien Loeb
Leg 1 (24 Oct)	SS8	La Pobla de Lillet 2	22.55 km	(France) Sébastien Loeb	Citroën Xsara WRC	14:55.3	(France) Sébastien Loeb
Leg 2 (25 Oct)	SS9	Olost 1	23.08 km	(France) Gilles Panizzi	Peugeot 206 WRC	11:39.4	(France) Sébastien Loeb
Leg 2 (25 Oct)	SS10	Lluçà 1	14.04 km	(Estonia) Markko Märtin	Ford Focus RS WRC '03	8:15.9	(France) Sébastien Loeb
Leg 2 (25 Oct)	SS11	Sant Boi de Lluçanès 1	12.85 km	(France) Gilles Panizzi	Peugeot 206 WRC	8:06.7	(France) Sébastien Loeb
Leg 2 (25 Oct)	SS12	Sant Julià 2	26.27 km	(Belgium) François Duval	Ford Focus RS WRC '03	15:30.4	(France) Sébastien Loeb
Leg 2 (25 Oct)	SS13	Taradell 2	5.05 km	(United Kingdom) Richard Burns	Peugeot 206 WRC	2:58.3	(France) Sébastien Loeb
Leg 2 (25 Oct)	SS14	Olost 2	23.08 km	(Estonia) Markko Märtin	Ford Focus RS WRC '03	11:37.0	(France) Sébastien Loeb
Leg 2 (25 Oct)	SS15	Lluçà 2	14.04 km	(Estonia) Markko Märtin	Ford Focus RS WRC '03	8:19.5	(France) Sébastien Loeb
Leg 2 (25 Oct)	SS16	Sant Boi de Lluçanès 2	12.85 km	(France) Sébastien Loeb	Citroën Xsara WRC	8:05.5	(France) Sébastien Loeb
Leg 3 (26 Oct)	SS17	Sant Bartomeu del Grau 1	11.55 km	(Norway) Petter Solberg	Subaru Impreza S9 WRC '03	6:27.2	(France) Sébastien Loeb
Leg 3 (26 Oct)	SS18	La Roca 1	5.05 km	(Czech Republic) Roman Kresta	Peugeot 206 WRC	3:16.2	(France) Sébastien Loeb
Leg 3 (26 Oct)	SS19	Viladrau 1	35.18 km	(Finland) Tommi Mäkinen	Subaru Impreza S9 WRC '03	23:19.8	(France) Sébastien Loeb
Leg 3 (26 Oct)	SS20	Sant Bartomeu del Grau 2	11.55 km	(Estonia) Markko Märtin	Ford Focus RS WRC '03	6:29.4	(France) Sébastien Loeb
Leg 3 (26 Oct)	SS21	La Roca 2	5.05 km	(Finland) Marcus Grönholm	Peugeot 206 WRC	3:22.2	(France) Sébastien Loeb
Leg 3 (26 Oct)	SS22	Viladrau 2	35.18 km	(France) Gilles Panizzi	Peugeot 206 WRC	23:38.4	(France) Gilles Panizzi

==== Championship standings ====
Pos.	Drivers' championships			Co-drivers' championships			Manufacturers' championships		
Pos.	Move	Driver	Points	Move	Co-driver	Points	Move	Manufacturer	Points
1	3	(France) Sébastien Loeb	63	3	(Monaco) Daniel Elena	63		(France) Citroën Total WRT	147
2	1	(Spain) Carlos Sainz	63	1	(Spain) Marc Martí	63		(France) Marlboro Peugeot Total	142
3	1	(Norway) Petter Solberg	62	1	(United Kingdom) Phil Mills	62		(Japan) 555 Subaru World Rally Team	93
4	1	(United Kingdom) Richard Burns	58	1	(United Kingdom) Robert Reid	58		(United Kingdom) Ford Motor Co. Ltd.	89
5	1	(Estonia) Markko Märtin	49	1	(United Kingdom) Michael Park	49		(Czech Republic) Škoda Motorsport	21

=== Junior World Rally Championship ===
==== Classification ====
Position		No.	Driver	Co-driver	Entrant	Car	Time	Difference	Points
Event	Class	No.	Driver	Co-driver	Entrant	Car	Time	Difference	Points
17	1	61	(France) Brice Tirabassi	(France) Jacques-Julien Renucci	(France) Renault Sport	Renault Clio S1600	4:16:33.7		10
19	2	74	(United Kingdom) Kris Meeke	(United Kingdom) Chris Patterson	(Germany) Opel Motorsport	Opel Corsa S1600	4:18:06.2	+1:32.5	8
21	3	69	(Spain) Salvador Cañellas Jr.	(Spain) Xavier Amigó	(Japan) Suzuki Sport	Suzuki Ignis S1600	4:18:41.8	+2:08.1	6
22	4	52	(Sweden) Daniel Carlsson	(Sweden) Matthias Andersson	(Japan) Suzuki Sport	Suzuki Ignis S1600	4:20:40.2	+4:06.5	5
24	5	71	(Estonia) Urmo Aava	(Estonia) Kuldar Sikk	(Japan) Suzuki Sport	Suzuki Ignis S1600	4:23:06.1	+6:32.4	4
25	6	64	(Finland) Ville-Pertti Teuronen	(Finland) Mikko Markkula	(Japan) Suzuki Sport	Suzuki Ignis S1600	4:23:14.2	+6:40.5	3
27	7	65	(Lebanon) Abdo Feghali	(Lebanon) Joseph Matar	(Italy) Astra Racing	Ford Puma S1600	4:27:21.3	+10:47.6	2
29	8	63	(Italy) Massimo Ceccato	(Italy) Mitia Dotta	(Italy) Top Run SRL	Fiat Punto S1600	4:30:58.7	+14:25.0	1
31	9	73	(Bulgaria) Krum Donchev	(Bulgaria) Ruman Manolov	(Italy) Auto Sport Italia	Peugeot 206 S1600	4:39:33.3	+22:59.6	0
32	10	76	(Italy) Luca Cecchettini	(Italy) Marco Muzzarelli	(Italy) Top Run SRL	Fiat Punto S1600	4:41:35.6	+25:01.9	0
33	11	70	(United Kingdom) Guy Wilks	(United Kingdom) Phil Pugh	(United Kingdom) Ford Motor Co. Ltd.	Ford Puma S1600	4:52:35.4	+36:01.7	0
Retired SS22		62	(Sweden) Oscar Svedlund	(Sweden) Björn Nilsson	(Germany) Volkswagen Racing	Volkswagen Polo S1600	Gearbox		0
Retired SS19		54	(Finland) Kosti Katajamäki	(Finland) Jani Laaksonen	(Germany) Volkswagen Racing	Volkswagen Polo S1600	Alternator		0
Retired SS14		57	(Bulgaria) Dimitar Iliev	(Bulgaria) Yanaki Yanakiev	(Italy) Auto Sport Italia	Peugeot 206 S1600	Accident		0
Retired SS9		67	(San Marino) Alessandro Broccoli	(Italy) Giovanni Agnese	(San Marino) Sab Motorsport	Opel Corsa S1600	Engine		0
Retired SS2		51	(San Marino) Mirco Baldacci	(Italy) Giovanni Bernacchini	(Italy) Purity Auto	Fiat Punto S1600	Engine		0

==== Special stages ====
Day	Stage	Stage name	Length	Winner	Car	Time	Class leaders
Leg 1 (24 Oct)	SS1	La Trona 1	13.17 km	(France) Brice Tirabassi	Renault Clio S1600	9:14.4	(France) Brice Tirabassi
Leg 1 (24 Oct)	SS2	Alpens — Les Llosses 1	21.80 km	(France) Brice Tirabassi	Renault Clio S1600	14:32.9	(France) Brice Tirabassi
Leg 1 (24 Oct)	SS3	La Pobla de Lillet 1	22.55 km	(France) Brice Tirabassi	Renault Clio S1600	16:37.8	(France) Brice Tirabassi
Leg 1 (24 Oct)	SS4	Sant Julià 1	26.27 km	(Spain) Salvador Cañellas Jr.	Suzuki Ignis S1600	17:22.9	(France) Brice Tirabassi
Leg 1 (24 Oct)	SS5	Taradell 1	5.05 km	(United Kingdom) Kris Meeke	Opel Corsa S1600	3:16.8	(France) Brice Tirabassi
Leg 1 (24 Oct)	SS6	La Trona 2	13.17 km	(France) Brice Tirabassi	Renault Clio S1600	9:06.9	(France) Brice Tirabassi
Leg 1 (24 Oct)	SS7	Alpens — Les Llosses 2	21.80 km	(France) Brice Tirabassi	Renault Clio S1600	14:23.6	(France) Brice Tirabassi
Leg 1 (24 Oct)	SS8	La Pobla de Lillet 2	22.55 km	(France) Brice Tirabassi	Renault Clio S1600	16:31.5	(France) Brice Tirabassi
Leg 2 (25 Oct)	SS9	Olost 1	23.08 km	(United Kingdom) Kris Meeke	Opel Corsa S1600	12:52.7	(France) Brice Tirabassi
Leg 2 (25 Oct)	SS10	Lluçà 1	14.04 km	(Spain) Salvador Cañellas Jr.	Suzuki Ignis S1600	9:07.6	(France) Brice Tirabassi
Leg 2 (25 Oct)	SS11	Sant Boi de Lluçanès 1	12.85 km	(France) Brice Tirabassi	Renault Clio S1600	8:55.4	(France) Brice Tirabassi
Leg 2 (25 Oct)	SS12	Sant Julià 2	26.27 km	(France) Brice Tirabassi	Renault Clio S1600	17:07.7	(France) Brice Tirabassi
Leg 2 (25 Oct)	SS13	Taradell 2	5.05 km	(United Kingdom) Kris Meeke	Opel Corsa S1600	3:14.6	(France) Brice Tirabassi
Leg 2 (25 Oct)	SS14	Olost 2	23.08 km	(France) Brice Tirabassi	Renault Clio S1600	12:50.4	(France) Brice Tirabassi
Leg 2 (25 Oct)	SS15	Lluçà 2	14.04 km	(Finland) Ville-Pertti Teuronen	Suzuki Ignis S1600	9:08.9	(France) Brice Tirabassi
Leg 2 (25 Oct)	SS16	Sant Boi de Lluçanès 2	12.85 km	(France) Brice Tirabassi	Renault Clio S1600	8:55.4	(France) Brice Tirabassi
Leg 3 (26 Oct)	SS17	Sant Bartomeu del Grau 1	11.55 km	(Spain) Salvador Cañellas Jr.	Suzuki Ignis S1600	7:03.4	(France) Brice Tirabassi
Leg 3 (26 Oct)	SS18	La Roca 1	5.05 km	(France) Brice Tirabassi	Renault Clio S1600	3:35.1	(France) Brice Tirabassi
Leg 3 (26 Oct)	SS19	Viladrau 1	35.18 km	(United Kingdom) Kris Meeke	Opel Corsa S1600	25:29.4	(France) Brice Tirabassi
Leg 3 (26 Oct)	SS20	Sant Bartomeu del Grau 2	11.55 km	(France) Brice Tirabassi	Renault Clio S1600	7:04.2	(France) Brice Tirabassi
Leg 3 (26 Oct)	SS21	La Roca 2	5.05 km	(France) Brice Tirabassi	Renault Clio S1600	3:39.7	(France) Brice Tirabassi
Leg 3 (26 Oct)	SS22	Viladrau 2	35.18 km	(France) Brice Tirabassi	Renault Clio S1600	25:45.1	(France) Brice Tirabassi

==== Championship standings ====
Pos.	Drivers' championships		
Pos.	Move	Driver	Points
1		(France) Brice Tirabassi	38
2		(Spain) Salvador Cañellas Jr.	31
3		(Sweden) Daniel Carlsson	23
4	1	(Estonia) Urmo Aava	20
5	1	(United Kingdom) Guy Wilks	18
