= 2003 Wales Rally GB =

Rally car race

2003 Wales Rally GB 59th Wales Rally GB
Round 14 of the 2003 World Rally Championship season
← Previous event
- Host country: Great Britain
- Rally base: Cardiff
- Dates run: November 6, 2003 – November 9, 2003
- Stages: 18 (376.81 km; 234.14 miles)
- Stage surface: Gravel
- Overall distance: 1,574.52 km (978.36 miles)

Statistics
- Crews: 75 at start, 39 at finish

Overall results
- Overall winner: (Norway) Petter Solberg (United Kingdom) Phil Mills (Japan) 555 Subaru World Rally Team; Subaru Impreza S9 WRC '03

The 2003 Wales Rally GB (formally the 59th Wales Rally GB) was the fourteenth round of the 2003 World Rally Championship. The race was held over four days between 6 November and 9 November 2003, and was based in Cardiff, Great Britain. Subaru's Petter Solberg won the race, his 5th win in the World Rally Championship.

== Background ==
=== Entry list ===
No.	Driver	Co-Driver	Entrant	Car	Tyre
World Rally Championship manufacturer entries
1	(Finland) Marcus Grönholm	(Finland) Timo Rautiainen	(France) Marlboro Peugeot Total	Peugeot 206 WRC	MI
2	(Belgium) Freddy Loix	(Belgium) Sven Smeets	(France) Marlboro Peugeot Total	Peugeot 206 WRC	MI
3	(Finland) Harri Rovanperä	(Finland) Risto Pietiläinen	(France) Marlboro Peugeot Total	Peugeot 206 WRC	MI
4	(Estonia) Markko Märtin	(United Kingdom) Michael Park	(United Kingdom) Ford Motor Co. Ltd.	Ford Focus RS WRC '03	MI
5	(Belgium) François Duval	(Belgium) Stéphane Prévot	(United Kingdom) Ford Motor Co. Ltd.	Ford Focus RS WRC '03	MI
6	(Finland) Mikko Hirvonen	(Finland) Jarmo Lehtinen	(United Kingdom) Ford Motor Co. Ltd.	Ford Focus RS WRC '02	MI
7	(Norway) Petter Solberg	(United Kingdom) Phil Mills	(Japan) 555 Subaru World Rally Team	Subaru Impreza S9 WRC '03	P
8	(Finland) Tommi Mäkinen	(Finland) Kaj Lindström	(Japan) 555 Subaru World Rally Team	Subaru Impreza S9 WRC '03	P
14	(France) Didier Auriol	(France) Denis Giraudet	(Czech Republic) Škoda Motorsport	Škoda Fabia WRC	MI
15	(Finland) Toni Gardemeister	(Finland) Paavo Lukander	(Czech Republic) Škoda Motorsport	Škoda Fabia WRC	MI
17	(United Kingdom) Colin McRae	(United Kingdom) Derek Ringer	(France) Citroën Total WRT	Citroën Xsara WRC	MI
18	(France) Sébastien Loeb	(Monaco) Daniel Elena	(France) Citroën Total WRT	Citroën Xsara WRC	MI
19	(Spain) Carlos Sainz	(Spain) Marc Martí	(France) Citroën Total WRT	Citroën Xsara WRC	MI
World Rally Championship entries
20	(Finland) Jari-Matti Latvala	(Finland) Miikka Anttila	(United Kingdom) Ford Motor Co. Ltd.	Ford Focus RS WRC '01	MI
21	(France) Gilles Panizzi	(France) Hervé Panizzi	(France) Bozian Racing	Peugeot 206 WRC	MI
22	(Czech Republic) Roman Kresta	(Czech Republic) Jan Tománek	(France) Bozian Racing	Peugeot 206 WRC	MI
23	(Germany) Antony Warmbold	(United Kingdom) Gemma Price	(Germany) AW Rally Team	Ford Focus RS WRC '02	MI
24	(Finland) Juuso Pykälistö	(Finland) Risto Mannisenmäki	(France) Bozian Racing	Peugeot 206 WRC	MI
25	(Spain) Daniel Solà	(Spain) Álex Romaní	(France) Citroën Sport	Citroën Xsara WRC	MI
26	(Czech Republic) Jan Kopecký	(Czech Republic) Filip Schovánek	(Czech Republic) Škoda Matador Team	Škoda Octavia WRC	MI
27	(United Kingdom) Steve Perez	(United Kingdom) Jonty Bolsover	(United Kingdom) Steve Perez	Ford Focus RS WRC '02	—N/a
33	(United Kingdom) Alistair Ginley	(Republic of Ireland) Rory Kennedy	(United Kingdom) Alistair Ginley	Ford Focus RS WRC '01	—N/a
34	(Austria) Manfred Stohl	(Austria) Ilka Minor	(Austria) Stohl Racing	Peugeot 206 WRC	P
35	(Sweden) Tobias Johansson	(Sweden) Per Carlsson	(Sweden) Tobias Johansson	Toyota Corolla WRC	—N/a
37	(Sweden) Andreas Eriksson	(Sweden) Pecka Svensson	(Sweden) Andreas Eriksson	Ford Focus RS WRC '02	—N/a
38	(Finland) Tapio Laukkanen	(Finland) Harri Kaapro	(Finland) Tapio Laukkanen	Subaru Impreza S7 WRC '01	—N/a
103	(Republic of Ireland) Eamonn Boland	(Republic of Ireland) Francis Regan	(Republic of Ireland) Eamonn Boland	Subaru Impreza S7 WRC '01	—N/a
104	(United Kingdom) Julian Reynolds	(United Kingdom) Ieuan Thomas	(United Kingdom) Julian Reynolds	Subaru Impreza 555	—N/a
105	(Slovakia) Jozef Béreš Jr.	(Czech Republic) Petr Starý	(Slovakia) Jozef Béreš Jr.	Toyota Corolla WRC	—N/a
106	(United Kingdom) Jimmy McRae	(United Kingdom) Pauline Gullick	(United Kingdom) Jimmy McRae	Subaru Impreza 555	—N/a
107	(Finland) Pentti Airikkala	(United Kingdom) Nigel Gardner	(Finland) Pentti Airikkala	Mitsubishi Lancer Evo VI	—N/a
JWRC entries
51	(San Marino) Mirco Baldacci	(Italy) Giovanni Bernacchini	(Italy) Purity Auto	Fiat Punto S1600	MI
52	(Sweden) Daniel Carlsson	(Sweden) Matthias Andersson	(Japan) Suzuki Sport	Suzuki Ignis S1600	MI
54	(Finland) Kosti Katajamäki	(Finland) Jani Laaksonen	(Germany) Volkswagen Racing	Volkswagen Polo S1600	MI
61	(France) Brice Tirabassi	(France) Jacques-Julien Renucci	(France) Renault Sport	Renault Clio S1600	MI
62	(Sweden) Oscar Svedlund	(Sweden) Björn Nilsson	(Germany) Volkswagen Racing	Volkswagen Polo S1600	MI
63	(Italy) Massimo Ceccato	(Italy) Mitia Dotta	(Italy) Top Run SRL	Fiat Punto S1600	MI
64	(Finland) Ville-Pertti Teuronen	(Finland) Mikko Markkula	(Japan) Suzuki Sport	Suzuki Ignis S1600	MI
65	(Lebanon) Abdo Feghali	(Lebanon) Joseph Matar	(Italy) Astra Racing	Ford Puma S1600	MI
67	(San Marino) Alessandro Broccoli	(Italy) Giovanni Agnese	(San Marino) Sab Motorsport	Opel Corsa S1600	MI
69	(Spain) Salvador Cañellas Jr.	(Spain) Xavier Amigó	(Japan) Suzuki Sport	Suzuki Ignis S1600	MI
70	(United Kingdom) Guy Wilks	(United Kingdom) Phil Pugh	(United Kingdom) Ford Motor Co. Ltd.	Ford Puma S1600	MI
71	(Estonia) Urmo Aava	(Estonia) Kuldar Sikk	(Japan) Suzuki Sport	Suzuki Ignis S1600	MI
74	(United Kingdom) Kris Meeke	(United Kingdom) Chris Patterson	(Germany) Opel Motorsport	Opel Corsa S1600	MI
76	(Italy) Luca Cecchettini	(Italy) Marco Muzzarelli	(Italy) Top Run SRL	Fiat Punto S1600	MI

=== Itinerary ===
All dates and times are GMT (UTC±0).

Date	Time	No.	Stage name	Distance
Leg 1 — 164.24 km
6 November	19:30	SS1	Cardiff Super Special 1	2.45 km
7 November	07:51	SS2	Brechfa	23.12 km
7 November	08:30	SS3	Trawscoed	27.97 km
7 November	11:20	SS4	Rheola 1	32.58 km
7 November	12:38	SS5	Resolfen 1	43.09 km
7 November	15:48	SS6	Rheola 2	32.58 km
7 November	19:32	SS7	Cardiff Super Special 2	2.45 km
Leg 2 — 138.71 km
8 November	07:47	SS8	Crychan 1	13.05 km
8 November	08:14	SS9	Halfway 1	18.53 km
8 November	10:27	SS10	Crychan 2	13.05 km
8 November	10:54	SS11	Halfway 2	18.53 km
8 November	13:13	SS12	Margam Forest	17.37 km
8 November	13:46	SS13	Margam Park 1	12.64 km
8 November	15:32	SS14	Resolfen 2	43.09 km
8 November	19:38	SS15	Cardiff Super Special 3	2.45 km
Leg 3 — 73.86 km
9 November	07:48	SS16	Rhondda 1	30.61 km
9 November	11:02	SS17	Rhondda 2	30.61 km
9 November	13:04	SS18	Margam Park 2	12.64 km

== Results ==
=== Overall ===
Pos.	No.	Driver	Co-driver	Team	Car	Time	Difference	Points
1	7	(Norway) Petter Solberg	(United Kingdom) Phil Mills	(Japan) 555 Subaru World Rally Team	Subaru Impreza S9 WRC '03	3:28:58.1		10
2	18	(France) Sébastien Loeb	(Monaco) Daniel Elena	(France) Citroën Total WRT	Citroën Xsara WRC	3:29:41.7	+43.6	8
3	8	(Finland) Tommi Mäkinen	(Finland) Kaj Lindström	(Japan) 555 Subaru World Rally Team	Subaru Impreza S9 WRC '03	3:31:56.9	+2:58.8	6
4	17	(United Kingdom) Colin McRae	(United Kingdom) Derek Ringer	(France) Citroën Total WRT	Citroën Xsara WRC	3:34:26.2	+5:28.1	5
5	5	(Belgium) François Duval	(Belgium) Stéphane Prévot	(United Kingdom) Ford Motor Co. Ltd.	Ford Focus RS WRC '03	3:36:14.2	+7:16.1	4
6	2	(Belgium) Freddy Loix	(Belgium) Sven Smeets	(France) Marlboro Peugeot Total	Peugeot 206 WRC	3:37:04.6	+8:06.5	3
7	34	(Austria) Manfred Stohl	(Austria) Ilka Minor	(Austria) Stohl Racing	Peugeot 206 WRC	3:37:46.5	+8:48.4	2
8	22	(Czech Republic) Roman Kresta	(Czech Republic) Jan Tománek	(France) Bozian Racing	Peugeot 206 WRC	3:38:00.7	+9:02.6	1

=== World Rally Cars ===
==== Classification ====
Position		No.	Driver	Co-driver	Entrant	Car	Time	Difference	Points
Event	Class	No.	Driver	Co-driver	Entrant	Car	Time	Difference	Points
1	1	7	(Norway) Petter Solberg	(United Kingdom) Phil Mills	(Japan) 555 Subaru World Rally Team	Subaru Impreza S9 WRC '03	3:28:58.1		10
2	2	18	(France) Sébastien Loeb	(Monaco) Daniel Elena	(France) Citroën Total WRT	Citroën Xsara WRC	3:29:41.7	+43.6	8
3	3	8	(Finland) Tommi Mäkinen	(Finland) Kaj Lindström	(Japan) 555 Subaru World Rally Team	Subaru Impreza S9 WRC '03	3:31:56.9	+2:58.8	6
4	4	17	(United Kingdom) Colin McRae	(United Kingdom) Derek Ringer	(France) Citroën Total WRT	Citroën Xsara WRC	3:34:26.2	+5:28.1	5
5	5	5	(Belgium) François Duval	(Belgium) Stéphane Prévot	(United Kingdom) Ford Motor Co. Ltd.	Ford Focus RS WRC '03	3:36:14.2	+7:16.1	4
6	6	2	(Belgium) Freddy Loix	(Belgium) Sven Smeets	(France) Marlboro Peugeot Total	Peugeot 206 WRC	3:37:04.6	+8:06.5	3
11	7	14	(France) Didier Auriol	(France) Denis Giraudet	(Czech Republic) Škoda Motorsport	Škoda Fabia WRC	3:44:44.0	+15:45.9	0
Retired SS16		3	(Finland) Harri Rovanperä	(Finland) Risto Pietiläinen	(France) Marlboro Peugeot Total	Peugeot 206 WRC	Transmission		0
Retired SS16		15	(Finland) Toni Gardemeister	(Finland) Paavo Lukander	(Czech Republic) Škoda Motorsport	Škoda Fabia WRC	Accident		0
Retired SS4		1	(Finland) Marcus Grönholm	(Finland) Timo Rautiainen	(France) Marlboro Peugeot Total	Peugeot 206 WRC	Lost wheel		0
Retired SS4		4	(Estonia) Markko Märtin	(United Kingdom) Michael Park	(United Kingdom) Ford Motor Co. Ltd.	Ford Focus RS WRC '03	Engine		0
Retired SS3		6	(Finland) Mikko Hirvonen	(Finland) Jarmo Lehtinen	(United Kingdom) Ford Motor Co. Ltd.	Ford Focus RS WRC '02	Accident		0
Retired SS3		19	(Spain) Carlos Sainz	(Spain) Marc Martí	(France) Citroën Total WRT	Citroën Xsara WRC	Accident		0

==== Special stages ====
Day	Stage	Stage name	Length	Winner	Car	Time	Class leaders
Leg 1 (6 Nov)	SS1	Cardiff Super Special 1	2.45 km	(Norway) Petter Solberg	Subaru Impreza S9 WRC '03	2:08.7	(Norway) Petter Solberg
Leg 1 (7 Nov)	SS2	Brechfa	23.12 km	(France) Sébastien Loeb	Citroën Xsara WRC	13:19.6	(France) Sébastien Loeb
Leg 1 (7 Nov)	SS3	Trawscoed	27.97 km	(France) Sébastien Loeb	Citroën Xsara WRC	16:23.4	(France) Sébastien Loeb
Leg 1 (7 Nov)	SS4	Rheola 1	32.58 km	(Norway) Petter Solberg	Subaru Impreza S9 WRC '03	17:58.6	(Norway) Petter Solberg
Leg 1 (7 Nov)	SS5	Resolfen 1	43.09 km	(Norway) Petter Solberg	Subaru Impreza S9 WRC '03	22:40.9	(Norway) Petter Solberg
Leg 1 (7 Nov)	SS6	Rheola 2	32.58 km	(France) Sébastien Loeb	Citroën Xsara WRC	17:50.9	(Norway) Petter Solberg
Leg 1 (7 Nov)	SS7	Cardiff Super Special 2	2.45 km	(Norway) Petter Solberg	Subaru Impreza S9 WRC '03	2:06.4	(Norway) Petter Solberg
Leg 2 (8 Nov)	SS8	Crychan 1	13.05 km	(Norway) Petter Solberg	Subaru Impreza S9 WRC '03	7:10.6	(Norway) Petter Solberg
Leg 2 (8 Nov)	SS9	Halfway 1	18.53 km	(Norway) Petter Solberg	Subaru Impreza S9 WRC '03	10:15.7	(Norway) Petter Solberg
Leg 2 (8 Nov)	SS10	Crychan 2	13.05 km	(Norway) Petter Solberg	Subaru Impreza S9 WRC '03	7:08.0	(Norway) Petter Solberg
Leg 2 (8 Nov)	SS11	Halfway 2	18.53 km	(Norway) Petter Solberg	Subaru Impreza S9 WRC '03	10:11.0	(Norway) Petter Solberg
Leg 2 (8 Nov)	SS12	Margam Forest	17.37 km	(Norway) Petter Solberg	Subaru Impreza S9 WRC '03	9:57.7	(Norway) Petter Solberg
Leg 2 (8 Nov)	SS13	Margam Park 1	12.64 km	(Norway) Petter Solberg	Subaru Impreza S9 WRC '03	7:08.8	(Norway) Petter Solberg
Leg 2 (8 Nov)	SS14	Resolfen 2	43.09 km	(Norway) Petter Solberg	Subaru Impreza S9 WRC '03	22:21.3	(Norway) Petter Solberg
Leg 2 (8 Nov)	SS15	Cardiff Super Special 3	2.45 km	(Norway) Petter Solberg	Subaru Impreza S9 WRC '03	2:05.1	(Norway) Petter Solberg
Leg 3 (9 Nov)	SS16	Rhondda 1	30.61 km	(France) Sébastien Loeb	Citroën Xsara WRC	16:25.5	(Norway) Petter Solberg
Leg 3 (9 Nov)	SS17	Rhondda 2	30.61 km	(France) Sébastien Loeb	Citroën Xsara WRC	16:21.1	(Norway) Petter Solberg
Leg 3 (9 Nov)	SS18	Margam Park 2	12.64 km	(Norway) Petter Solberg	Subaru Impreza S9 WRC '03	7:07.4	(Norway) Petter Solberg

==== Championship standings ====
- **Bold text** indicates 2003 World Champions.

Pos.	Drivers' championships			Co-drivers' championships			Manufacturers' championships		
Pos.	Move	Driver	Points	Move	Co-driver	Points	Move	Manufacturer	Points
1	2	(Norway) **Petter Solberg**	72	2	(United Kingdom) **Phil Mills**	72		(France) **Citroën Total WRT**	160
2	1	(France) Sébastien Loeb	71	1	(Monaco) Daniel Elena	71		(France) Marlboro Peugeot Total	145
3	1	(Spain) Carlos Sainz	63	1	(Spain) Marc Martí	63		(Japan) 555 Subaru World Rally Team	109
4		(United Kingdom) Richard Burns	58		(United Kingdom) Robert Reid	58		(United Kingdom) Ford Motor Co. Ltd.	93
5		(Estonia) Markko Märtin	49		(United Kingdom) Michael Park	49		(Czech Republic) Škoda Motorsport	23

=== Junior World Rally Championship ===
==== Classification ====
Position		No.	Driver	Co-driver	Entrant	Car	Time	Difference	Points
Event	Class	No.	Driver	Co-driver	Entrant	Car	Time	Difference	Points
14	1	52	(Sweden) Daniel Carlsson	(Sweden) Matthias Andersson	(Japan) Suzuki Sport	Suzuki Ignis S1600	3:57:29.8		10
15	2	51	(San Marino) Mirco Baldacci	(Italy) Giovanni Bernacchini	(Italy) Purity Auto	Fiat Punto S1600	3:59:04.2	+1:34.4	8
23	3	64	(Finland) Ville-Pertti Teuronen	(Finland) Mikko Markkula	(Japan) Suzuki Sport	Suzuki Ignis S1600	4:04:51.6	+7:21.8	6
28	4	69	(Spain) Salvador Cañellas Jr.	(Spain) Xavier Amigó	(Japan) Suzuki Sport	Suzuki Ignis S1600	4:14:50.3	+17:20.5	5
29	5	67	(San Marino) Alessandro Broccoli	(Italy) Giovanni Agnese	(San Marino) Sab Motorsport	Opel Corsa S1600	4:20:58.2	+23:28.4	4
30	6	63	(Italy) Massimo Ceccato	(Italy) Mitia Dotta	(Italy) Top Run SRL	Fiat Punto S1600	4:24:25.8	+26:56.0	3
Retired SS17		71	(Estonia) Urmo Aava	(Estonia) Kuldar Sikk	(Japan) Suzuki Sport	Suzuki Ignis S1600	Driveshaft		0
Retired SS17		74	(United Kingdom) Kris Meeke	(United Kingdom) Chris Patterson	(Germany) Opel Motorsport	Opel Corsa S1600	Accident		0
Retired SS16		62	(Sweden) Oscar Svedlund	(Sweden) Björn Nilsson	(Germany) Volkswagen Racing	Volkswagen Polo S1600	Mechanical		0
Retired SS15		76	(Italy) Luca Cecchettini	(Italy) Marco Muzzarelli	(Italy) Top Run SRL	Fiat Punto S1600	Engine		0
Retired SS13		54	(Finland) Kosti Katajamäki	(Finland) Jani Laaksonen	(Germany) Volkswagen Racing	Volkswagen Polo S1600	Steering		0
Retired SS11		61	(France) Brice Tirabassi	(France) Jacques-Julien Renucci	(France) Renault Sport	Renault Clio S1600	Engine		0
Retired SS5		65	(Lebanon) Abdo Feghali	(Lebanon) Joseph Matar	(Italy) Astra Racing	Ford Puma S1600	Gearbox		0
Retired SS5		70	(United Kingdom) Guy Wilks	(United Kingdom) Phil Pugh	(United Kingdom) Ford Motor Co. Ltd.	Ford Puma S1600	Water pump		0

==== Special stages ====
Day	Stage	Stage name	Length	Winner	Car	Time	Class leaders
Leg 1 (6 Nov)	SS1	Cardiff Super Special 1	2.45 km	(San Marino) Mirco Baldacci (United Kingdom) Kris Meeke	Fiat Punto S1600; Opel Corsa S1600	2:25.0	(San Marino) Mirco Baldacci (United Kingdom) Kris Meeke
Leg 1 (7 Nov)	SS2	Brechfa	23.12 km	(United Kingdom) Kris Meeke	Opel Corsa S1600	15:45.5	(United Kingdom) Kris Meeke
Leg 1 (7 Nov)	SS3	Trawscoed	27.97 km	(Sweden) Daniel Carlsson	Suzuki Ignis S1600	19:11.2	(United Kingdom) Kris Meeke
Leg 1 (7 Nov)	SS4	Rheola 1	32.58 km	(Sweden) Daniel Carlsson	Suzuki Ignis S1600	20:28.2	(United Kingdom) Kris Meeke
Leg 1 (7 Nov)	SS5	Resolfen 1	43.09 km	(Sweden) Daniel Carlsson	Suzuki Ignis S1600	25:48.7	(Sweden) Daniel Carlsson
Leg 1 (7 Nov)	SS6	Rheola 2	32.58 km	(France) Brice Tirabassi	Renault Clio S1600	20:09.7	(Sweden) Daniel Carlsson
Leg 1 (7 Nov)	SS7	Cardiff Super Special 2	2.45 km	(San Marino) Mirco Baldacci	Fiat Punto S1600	2:21.4	(Sweden) Daniel Carlsson
Leg 2 (8 Nov)	SS8	Crychan 1	13.05 km	(Sweden) Daniel Carlsson	Suzuki Ignis S1600	8:06.1	(Sweden) Daniel Carlsson
Leg 2 (8 Nov)	SS9	Halfway 1	18.53 km	(Sweden) Daniel Carlsson	Suzuki Ignis S1600	11:26.0	(Sweden) Daniel Carlsson
Leg 2 (8 Nov)	SS10	Crychan 2	13.05 km	(Sweden) Daniel Carlsson	Suzuki Ignis S1600	8:02.6	(Sweden) Daniel Carlsson
Leg 2 (8 Nov)	SS11	Halfway 2	18.53 km	(United Kingdom) Kris Meeke	Opel Corsa S1600	11:18.6	(Sweden) Daniel Carlsson
Leg 2 (8 Nov)	SS12	Margam Forest	17.37 km	(Sweden) Daniel Carlsson	Suzuki Ignis S1600	11:13.7	(Sweden) Daniel Carlsson
Leg 2 (8 Nov)	SS13	Margam Park 1	12.64 km	(United Kingdom) Kris Meeke	Opel Corsa S1600	8:05.0	(Sweden) Daniel Carlsson
Leg 2 (8 Nov)	SS14	Resolfen 2	43.09 km	(Sweden) Daniel Carlsson	Suzuki Ignis S1600	25:18.6	(Sweden) Daniel Carlsson
Leg 2 (8 Nov)	SS15	Cardiff Super Special 3	2.45 km	(United Kingdom) Kris Meeke	Opel Corsa S1600	2:18.5	(Sweden) Daniel Carlsson
Leg 3 (9 Nov)	SS16	Rhondda 1	30.61 km	(United Kingdom) Kris Meeke	Opel Corsa S1600	18:27.2	(Sweden) Daniel Carlsson
Leg 3 (9 Nov)	SS17	Rhondda 2	30.61 km	(Sweden) Daniel Carlsson	Suzuki Ignis S1600	18:24.9	(Sweden) Daniel Carlsson
Leg 3 (9 Nov)	SS18	Margam Park 2	12.64 km	(Sweden) Daniel Carlsson	Suzuki Ignis S1600	8:09.4	(Sweden) Daniel Carlsson

==== Championship standings ====
- **Bold text** indicates 2003 World Champions.

Pos.	Drivers' championships		
Pos.	Move	Driver	Points
1		(France) **Brice Tirabassi**	38
2		(Spain) Salvador Cañellas Jr.	36
3		(Sweden) Daniel Carlsson	33
4	3	(San Marino) Mirco Baldacci	20
5	1	(Estonia) Urmo Aava	20
