= 2003 Rally Finland =

Motor rally competition

2003 Rally Finland 53rd Neste Rally Finland
Round 9 of the 2003 World Rally Championship season
← Previous event	Next event →
- Host country: Finland
- Rally base: Jyväskylä
- Dates run: August 7, 2003 – August 10, 2003
- Stages: 23 (409.18 km; 254.25 miles)
- Stage surface: Gravel
- Overall distance: 1,727.60 km (1,073.48 miles)

Statistics
- Crews: 71 at start, 35 at finish

Overall results
- Overall winner: (Estonia) Markko Märtin (United Kingdom) Michael Park (United Kingdom) Ford Motor Co. Ltd. Ford Focus RS WRC '03

The 2003 Rally Finland (formally the 53rd Neste Rally Finland) was the ninth round of the 2003 World Rally Championship. The race was held over four days between 7 August and 10 August 2003, and was based in Jyväskylä, Finland. Ford's Markko Märtin won the race, his 2nd win in the World Rally Championship.

== Background ==
=== Entry list ===
No.	Driver	Co-Driver	Entrant	Car	Tyre
World Rally Championship manufacturer entries
1	(Finland) Marcus Grönholm	(Finland) Timo Rautiainen	(France) Marlboro Peugeot Total	Peugeot 206 WRC	MI
2	(United Kingdom) Richard Burns	(United Kingdom) Robert Reid	(France) Marlboro Peugeot Total	Peugeot 206 WRC	MI
3	(Finland) Harri Rovanperä	(Finland) Risto Pietiläinen	(France) Marlboro Peugeot Total	Peugeot 206 WRC	MI
4	(Estonia) Markko Märtin	(United Kingdom) Michael Park	(United Kingdom) Ford Motor Co. Ltd.	Ford Focus RS WRC '03	MI
5	(Belgium) François Duval	(Belgium) Stéphane Prévot	(United Kingdom) Ford Motor Co. Ltd.	Ford Focus RS WRC '03	MI
6	(Finland) Mikko Hirvonen	(Finland) Jarmo Lehtinen	(United Kingdom) Ford Motor Co. Ltd.	Ford Focus RS WRC '02	MI
7	(Norway) Petter Solberg	(United Kingdom) Phil Mills	(Japan) 555 Subaru World Rally Team	Subaru Impreza S9 WRC '03	P
8	(Finland) Tommi Mäkinen	(Finland) Kaj Lindström	(Japan) 555 Subaru World Rally Team	Subaru Impreza S9 WRC '03	P
10	(Germany) Armin Schwarz	(Germany) Manfred Hiemer	(South Korea) Hyundai World Rally Team	Hyundai Accent WRC3	MI
11	(Belgium) Freddy Loix	(Belgium) Sven Smeets	(South Korea) Hyundai World Rally Team	Hyundai Accent WRC3	MI
12	(Finland) Jussi Välimäki	(Finland) Tero Gardemeister	(South Korea) Hyundai World Rally Team	Hyundai Accent WRC3	MI
14	(France) Didier Auriol	(France) Denis Giraudet	(Czech Republic) Škoda Motorsport	Škoda Fabia WRC	MI
15	(Finland) Toni Gardemeister	(Finland) Paavo Lukander	(Czech Republic) Škoda Motorsport	Škoda Fabia WRC	MI
17	(United Kingdom) Colin McRae	(United Kingdom) Derek Ringer	(France) Citroën Total WRT	Citroën Xsara WRC	MI
18	(France) Sébastien Loeb	(Monaco) Daniel Elena	(France) Citroën Total WRT	Citroën Xsara WRC	MI
19	(Spain) Carlos Sainz	(Spain) Marc Martí	(France) Citroën Total WRT	Citroën Xsara WRC	MI
World Rally Championship entries
20	(Finland) Jari-Matti Latvala	(Finland) Miikka Anttila	(United Kingdom) Ford Motor Co. Ltd.	Ford Focus RS WRC '02	MI
21	(Germany) Antony Warmbold	(United Kingdom) Gemma Price	(Germany) AW Rally Team	Ford Focus RS WRC '02	—N/a
22	(Finland) Juuso Pykälistö	(Finland) Esko Mertsalmi	(France) Bozian Racing	Peugeot 206 WRC	MI
23	(Finland) Janne Tuohino	(Finland) Jukka Aho	(Finland) Janne Tuohino	Ford Focus RS WRC '02	MI
24	(Finland) Sebastian Lindholm	(Finland) Timo Hantunen	Peugeot Sport Finland	Peugeot 206 WRC	—N/a
25	(Finland) Kaj Kuistila	(Finland) Kari Jokinen	(Finland) Kaj Kuistila	Ford Focus RS WRC '02	—N/a
26	(Finland) Ari Vatanen	(Finland) Juha Repo	(France) Bozian Racing	Peugeot 206 WRC	MI
27	(Finland) Jari Viita	(Finland) Riku Rousku	(Finland) Jari Viita	Ford Focus RS WRC '01	—N/a
33	(United Kingdom) Alistair Ginley	(Republic of Ireland) Rory Kennedy	(United Kingdom) Alistair Ginley	Ford Focus RS WRC '01	—N/a
34	(Sweden) Tobias Johansson	(Sweden) Benny Locander	(Sweden) Tobias Johansson	Toyota Corolla WRC	—N/a
35	(Norway) Henning Solberg	(Norway) Cato Menkerud	(Norway) Henning Solberg	Mitsubishi Lancer Evo 6.5	—N/a
117	(United Kingdom) Gareth Jones	(United Kingdom) Mark Jones	(United Kingdom) Gareth Jones	Toyota Corolla WRC	KU
JWRC entries
51	(San Marino) Mirco Baldacci	(Italy) Giovanni Bernacchini	(Italy) Purity Auto	Fiat Punto S1600	MI
52	(Sweden) Daniel Carlsson	(Sweden) Matthias Andersson	(Japan) Suzuki Sport	Suzuki Ignis S1600	MI
54	(Finland) Kosti Katajamäki	(Finland) Jani Laaksonen	(Germany) Volkswagen Racing	Volkswagen Polo S1600	MI
57	(Bulgaria) Dimitar Iliev	(Bulgaria) Yanaki Yanakiev	(Italy) Auto Sport Italia	Peugeot 206 S1600	MI
58	(Argentina) Marcos Ligato	(Argentina) Rubén García	(Italy) Top Run SRL	Fiat Punto S1600	MI
61	(France) Brice Tirabassi	(France) Jacques-Julien Renucci	(France) Renault Sport	Renault Clio S1600	MI
62	(Sweden) Oscar Svedlund	(Sweden) Björn Nilsson	(Germany) Volkswagen Racing	Volkswagen Polo S1600	MI
63	(Italy) Massimo Ceccato	(Italy) Mitia Dotta	(Italy) Top Run SRL	Fiat Punto S1600	MI
64	(Finland) Ville-Pertti Teuronen	(Finland) Harri Kaapro	(Japan) Suzuki Sport	Suzuki Ignis S1600	MI
65	(Lebanon) Abdo Feghali	(Lebanon) Joseph Matar	(Italy) Astra Racing	Ford Puma S1600	MI
67	(San Marino) Alessandro Broccoli	(Italy) Simona Girelli	(San Marino) Sab Motorsport	Opel Corsa S1600	MI
69	(Spain) Salvador Cañellas Jr.	(Spain) Xavier Amigó	(Japan) Suzuki Sport	Suzuki Ignis S1600	MI
70	(United Kingdom) Guy Wilks	(United Kingdom) Phil Pugh	(United Kingdom) Ford Motor Co. Ltd.	Ford Puma S1600	MI
71	(Estonia) Urmo Aava	(Estonia) Kuldar Sikk	(Japan) Suzuki Sport	Suzuki Ignis S1600	MI
74	(United Kingdom) Kris Meeke	(United Kingdom) Chris Patterson	(Germany) Opel Motorsport	Opel Corsa S1600	MI
76	(Italy) Luca Cecchettini	(Italy) Marco Muzzarelli	(Italy) Top Run SRL	Fiat Punto S1600	MI
78	(Germany) Vladan Vasiljevic	(Germany) Sebastian Geipel	Peugeot Dealer Team Sweden	Peugeot 206 S1600	MI

=== Itinerary ===
All dates and times are EEST (UTC+3).

Date	Time	No.	Stage name	Distance
Leg 1 — 140.36 km
7 August	19:00	SS1	Killeri 1	2.06 km
8 August	09:00	SS2	Jukojärvi 1	22.31 km
8 August	09:31	SS3	Kruununperä 1	20.17 km
8 August	11:48	SS4	Valkola	8.42 km
8 August	12:31	SS5	Lankamaa	23.47 km
8 August	13:22	SS6	Laukaa	11.82 km
8 August	14:20	SS7	Ruuhimäki	7.57 km
8 August	16:37	SS8	Jukojärvi 2	22.31 km
8 August	17:08	SS9	Kruununperä 2	20.17 km
8 August	19:50	SS10	Killeri 2	2.06 km
Leg 2 — 167.92 km
9 August	08:04	SS11	Päijälä	21.95 km
9 August	08:39	SS12	Ouninpohja 1	33.24 km
9 August	11:29	SS13	Urria	10.00 km
9 August	12:47	SS14	Ouninpohja 2	33.24 km
9 August	13:50	SS15	Ehikki	14.91 km
9 August	16:18	SS16	Moksi — Leustu	40.96 km
9 August	17:30	SS17	Himos	13.62 km
Leg 3 — 100.90 km
10 August	08:56	SS18	Parkkola 1	19.88 km
10 August	09:56	SS19	Mökkiperä 1	13.96 km
10 August	10:30	SS20	Palsankylä	25.46 km
10 August	12:38	SS21	Kuohu	7.76 km
10 August	13:05	SS22	Parkkola 2	19.88 km
10 August	14:05	SS23	Mökkiperä 2	13.96 km

== Results ==
=== Overall ===
Pos.	No.	Driver	Co-driver	Team	Car	Time	Difference	Points
1	4	(Estonia) Markko Märtin	(United Kingdom) Michael Park	(United Kingdom) Ford Motor Co. Ltd.	Ford Focus RS WRC '03	3:21:51.7		10
2	7	(Norway) Petter Solberg	(United Kingdom) Phil Mills	(Japan) 555 Subaru World Rally Team	Subaru Impreza S9 WRC '03	3:22:50.6	+58.9	8
3	2	(United Kingdom) Richard Burns	(United Kingdom) Robert Reid	(France) Marlboro Peugeot Total	Peugeot 206 WRC	3:22:51.8	+1:00.1	6
4	19	(Spain) Carlos Sainz	(Spain) Marc Martí	(France) Citroën Total WRT	Citroën Xsara WRC	3:23:50.7	+1:59.0	5
5	18	(France) Sébastien Loeb	(Monaco) Daniel Elena	(France) Citroën Total WRT	Citroën Xsara WRC	3:24:40.4	+2:48.7	4
6	8	(Finland) Tommi Mäkinen	(Finland) Kaj Lindström	(Japan) 555 Subaru World Rally Team	Subaru Impreza S9 WRC '03	3:25:16.9	+3:25.2	3
7	23	(Finland) Janne Tuohino	(Finland) Jukka Aho	(Finland) Janne Tuohino	Ford Focus RS WRC '02	3:26:14.6	+4:22.9	2
8	24	(Finland) Sebastian Lindholm	(Finland) Timo Hantunen	Peugeot Sport Finland	Peugeot 206 WRC	3:26:31.2	+4:39.5	1

=== World Rally Cars ===
==== Classification ====
Position		No.	Driver	Co-driver	Entrant	Car	Time	Difference	Points
Event	Class	No.	Driver	Co-driver	Entrant	Car	Time	Difference	Points
1	1	4	(Estonia) Markko Märtin	(United Kingdom) Michael Park	(United Kingdom) Ford Motor Co. Ltd.	Ford Focus RS WRC '03	3:21:51.7		10
2	2	7	(Norway) Petter Solberg	(United Kingdom) Phil Mills	(Japan) 555 Subaru World Rally Team	Subaru Impreza S9 WRC '03	3:22:50.6	+58.9	8
3	3	2	(United Kingdom) Richard Burns	(United Kingdom) Robert Reid	(France) Marlboro Peugeot Total	Peugeot 206 WRC	3:22:51.8	+1:00.1	6
4	4	19	(Spain) Carlos Sainz	(Spain) Marc Martí	(France) Citroën Total WRT	Citroën Xsara WRC	3:23:50.7	+1:59.0	5
5	5	18	(France) Sébastien Loeb	(Monaco) Daniel Elena	(France) Citroën Total WRT	Citroën Xsara WRC	3:24:40.4	+2:48.7	4
6	6	8	(Finland) Tommi Mäkinen	(Finland) Kaj Lindström	(Japan) 555 Subaru World Rally Team	Subaru Impreza S9 WRC '03	3:25:16.9	+3:25.2	3
10	7	11	(Belgium) Freddy Loix	(Belgium) Sven Smeets	(South Korea) Hyundai World Rally Team	Hyundai Accent WRC3	3:30:11.6	+8:19.9	0
12	8	10	(Germany) Armin Schwarz	(Germany) Manfred Hiemer	(South Korea) Hyundai World Rally Team	Hyundai Accent WRC3	3:34:43.2	+12:51.5	0
Retired SS19		5	(Belgium) François Duval	(Belgium) Stéphane Prévot	(United Kingdom) Ford Motor Co. Ltd.	Ford Focus RS WRC '03	Accident		0
Retired SS19		12	(Finland) Jussi Välimäki	(Finland) Tero Gardemeister	(South Korea) Hyundai World Rally Team	Hyundai Accent WRC3	Accident		0
Retired SS16		17	(United Kingdom) Colin McRae	(United Kingdom) Derek Ringer	(France) Citroën Total WRT	Citroën Xsara WRC	Accident		0
Retired SS15		1	(Finland) Marcus Grönholm	(Finland) Timo Rautiainen	(France) Marlboro Peugeot Total	Peugeot 206 WRC	Lost wheel		0
Retired SS13		15	(Finland) Toni Gardemeister	(Finland) Paavo Lukander	(Czech Republic) Škoda Motorsport	Škoda Fabia WRC	Engine		0
Retired SS12		3	(Finland) Harri Rovanperä	(Finland) Risto Pietiläinen	(France) Marlboro Peugeot Total	Peugeot 206 WRC	Accident		0
Retired SS12		6	(Finland) Mikko Hirvonen	(Finland) Jarmo Lehtinen	(United Kingdom) Ford Motor Co. Ltd.	Ford Focus RS WRC '02	Engine		0
Retired SS2		14	(France) Didier Auriol	(France) Denis Giraudet	(Czech Republic) Škoda Motorsport	Škoda Fabia WRC	Driver injury		0

==== Special stages ====
Day	Stage	Stage name	Length	Winner	Car	Time	Class leaders
Leg 1 (7 Aug)	SS1	Killeri 1	2.06 km	(Estonia) Markko Märtin	Ford Focus RS WRC '03	1:18.6	(Estonia) Markko Märtin
Leg 1 (8 Aug)	SS2	Jukojärvi 1	22.31 km	(Finland) Marcus Grönholm (Estonia) Markko Märtin	Peugeot 206 WRC; Ford Focus RS WRC '03	10:50.8	(Estonia) Markko Märtin
Leg 1 (8 Aug)	SS3	Kruununperä 1	20.17 km	(Estonia) Markko Märtin	Ford Focus RS WRC '03	9:12.4	(Estonia) Markko Märtin
Leg 1 (8 Aug)	SS4	Valkola	8.42 km	(Finland) Marcus Grönholm	Peugeot 206 WRC	4:25.4	(Estonia) Markko Märtin
Leg 1 (8 Aug)	SS5	Lankamaa	23.47 km	(Finland) Marcus Grönholm	Peugeot 206 WRC	11:26.0	(Finland) Marcus Grönholm
Leg 1 (8 Aug)	SS6	Laukaa	11.82 km	(Estonia) Markko Märtin	Ford Focus RS WRC '03	5:46.1	(Finland) Marcus Grönholm
Leg 1 (8 Aug)	SS7	Ruuhimäki	7.57 km	(United Kingdom) Richard Burns	Peugeot 206 WRC	4:03.4	(Finland) Marcus Grönholm
Leg 1 (8 Aug)	SS8	Jukojärvi 2	22.31 km	(Estonia) Markko Märtin	Ford Focus RS WRC '03	10:40.1	(Finland) Marcus Grönholm
Leg 1 (8 Aug)	SS9	Kruununperä 2	20.17 km	(Estonia) Markko Märtin	Ford Focus RS WRC '03	9:03.0	(Estonia) Markko Märtin
Leg 1 (8 Aug)	SS10	Killeri 2	2.06 km	(Finland) Marcus Grönholm	Peugeot 206 WRC	1:19.1	(Estonia) Markko Märtin
Leg 2 (9 Aug)	SS11	Päijälä	21.95 km	(Finland) Marcus Grönholm	Peugeot 206 WRC	11:21.4	(Estonia) Markko Märtin
Leg 2 (9 Aug)	SS12	Ouninpohja 1	33.24 km	(Finland) Marcus Grönholm	Peugeot 206 WRC	15:31.0	(Finland) Marcus Grönholm
Leg 2 (9 Aug)	SS13	Urria	10.00 km	(United Kingdom) Richard Burns	Peugeot 206 WRC	4:48.4	(Finland) Marcus Grönholm
Leg 2 (9 Aug)	SS14	Ouninpohja 2	33.24 km	(United Kingdom) Colin McRae	Citroën Xsara WRC	15:25.1	(Estonia) Markko Märtin
Leg 2 (9 Aug)	SS15	Ehikki	14.91 km	(United Kingdom) Richard Burns	Peugeot 206 WRC	6:52.6	(Estonia) Markko Märtin
Leg 2 (9 Aug)	SS16	Moksi — Leustu	40.96 km	(Estonia) Markko Märtin	Ford Focus RS WRC '03	20:39.2	(Estonia) Markko Märtin
Leg 2 (9 Aug)	SS17	Himos	13.62 km	(Norway) Petter Solberg	Subaru Impreza S9 WRC '03	7:30.1	(Estonia) Markko Märtin
Leg 3 (10 Aug)	SS18	Parkkola 1	19.88 km	(Estonia) Markko Märtin	Ford Focus RS WRC '03	9:53.0	(Estonia) Markko Märtin
Leg 3 (10 Aug)	SS19	Mökkiperä 1	13.96 km	(United Kingdom) Richard Burns	Peugeot 206 WRC	6:56.0	(Estonia) Markko Märtin
Leg 3 (10 Aug)	SS20	Palsankylä	25.46 km	(United Kingdom) Richard Burns	Peugeot 206 WRC	13:31.2	(Estonia) Markko Märtin
Leg 3 (10 Aug)	SS21	Kuohu	7.76 km	(United Kingdom) Richard Burns	Peugeot 206 WRC	3:45.3	(Estonia) Markko Märtin
Leg 3 (10 Aug)	SS22	Parkkola 2	19.88 km	(Norway) Petter Solberg	Subaru Impreza S9 WRC '03	9:39.7	(Estonia) Markko Märtin
Leg 3 (10 Aug)	SS23	Mökkiperä 2	13.96 km	(Norway) Petter Solberg	Subaru Impreza S9 WRC '03	6:47.8	(Estonia) Markko Märtin

==== Championship standings ====
Pos.	Drivers' championships			Co-drivers' championships			Manufacturers' championships		
Pos.	Move	Driver	Points	Move	Co-driver	Points	Move	Manufacturer	Points
1		(United Kingdom) Richard Burns	49		(United Kingdom) Robert Reid	49		(France) Marlboro Peugeot Total	101
2		(Spain) Carlos Sainz	44		(Spain) Marc Martí	44		(France) Citroën Total WRT	97
3		(Finland) Marcus Grönholm	38		(Finland) Timo Rautiainen	38		(United Kingdom) Ford Motor Co. Ltd.	60
4	1	(Norway) Petter Solberg	38	1	(United Kingdom) Phil Mills	38		(Japan) 555 Subaru World Rally Team	60
5	1	(France) Sébastien Loeb	37	1	(Monaco) Daniel Elena	37		(Czech Republic) Škoda Motorsport	20

=== Junior World Rally Championship ===
==== Classification ====
Position		No.	Driver	Co-driver	Entrant	Car	Time	Difference	Points
Event	Class	No.	Driver	Co-driver	Entrant	Car	Time	Difference	Points
19	1	52	(Sweden) Daniel Carlsson	(Sweden) Matthias Andersson	(Japan) Suzuki Sport	Suzuki Ignis S1600	3:52:22.9		10
20	2	61	(France) Brice Tirabassi	(France) Jacques-Julien Renucci	(France) Renault Sport	Renault Clio S1600	3:53:19.8	+56.9	8
24	3	70	(United Kingdom) Guy Wilks	(United Kingdom) Phil Pugh	(United Kingdom) Ford Motor Co. Ltd.	Ford Puma S1600	3:58:05.9	+5:43.0	6
25	4	71	(Estonia) Urmo Aava	(Estonia) Kuldar Sikk	(Japan) Suzuki Sport	Suzuki Ignis S1600	4:01:04.6	+8:41.7	5
26	5	69	(Spain) Salvador Cañellas Jr.	(Spain) Xavier Amigó	(Japan) Suzuki Sport	Suzuki Ignis S1600	4:01:09.8	+8:46.9	4
27	6	67	(San Marino) Alessandro Broccoli	(Italy) Simona Girelli	(San Marino) Sab Motorsport	Opel Corsa S1600	4:03:31.3	+11:08.4	3
30	7	58	(Argentina) Marcos Ligato	(Argentina) Rubén García	(Italy) Top Run SRL	Fiat Punto S1600	4:09:29.5	+17:06.6	2
33	8	62	(Sweden) Oscar Svedlund	(Sweden) Björn Nilsson	(Germany) Volkswagen Racing	Volkswagen Polo S1600	4:12:50.9	+20:28.0	1
Retired SS22		63	(Italy) Massimo Ceccato	(Italy) Mitia Dotta	(Italy) Top Run SRL	Fiat Punto S1600	Accident		0
Retired SS19		74	(United Kingdom) Kris Meeke	(United Kingdom) Chris Patterson	(Germany) Opel Motorsport	Opel Corsa S1600	Electrical		0
Retired SS14		54	(Finland) Kosti Katajamäki	(Finland) Jani Laaksonen	(Germany) Volkswagen Racing	Volkswagen Polo S1600	Accident		0
Retired SS12		64	(Finland) Ville-Pertti Teuronen	(Finland) Harri Kaapro	(Japan) Suzuki Sport	Suzuki Ignis S1600	Accident		0
Retired SS6		51	(San Marino) Mirco Baldacci	(Italy) Giovanni Bernacchini	(Italy) Purity Auto	Fiat Punto S1600	Driveshaft		0
Retired SS6		57	(Bulgaria) Dimitar Iliev	(Bulgaria) Yanaki Yanakiev	(Italy) Auto Sport Italia	Peugeot 206 S1600	Mechanical		0
Retired SS5		76	(Italy) Luca Cecchettini	(Italy) Marco Muzzarelli	(Italy) Top Run SRL	Fiat Punto S1600	Accident		0
Retired SS1		65	(Lebanon) Abdo Feghali	(Lebanon) Joseph Matar	(Italy) Astra Racing	Ford Puma S1600	Accident		0
Retired SS1		78	(Germany) Vladan Vasiljevic	(Germany) Sebastian Geipel	Peugeot Dealer Team Sweden	Peugeot 206 S1600	Mechanical		0

==== Special stages ====
Day	Stage	Stage name	Length	Winner	Car	Time	Class leaders
Leg 1 (7 Aug)	SS1	Killeri 1	2.06 km	(Sweden) Daniel Carlsson	Suzuki Ignis S1600	1:27.3	(Sweden) Daniel Carlsson
Leg 1 (8 Aug)	SS2	Jukojärvi 1	22.31 km	(Finland) Ville-Pertti Teuronen	Suzuki Ignis S1600	12:12.7	(Sweden) Daniel Carlsson
Leg 1 (8 Aug)	SS3	Kruununperä 1	20.17 km	(Sweden) Daniel Carlsson	Suzuki Ignis S1600	10:26.9	(Sweden) Daniel Carlsson
Leg 1 (8 Aug)	SS4	Valkola	8.42 km	(United Kingdom) Guy Wilks	Ford Puma S1600	5:08.8	(Sweden) Daniel Carlsson
Leg 1 (8 Aug)	SS5	Lankamaa	23.47 km	(Sweden) Daniel Carlsson	Suzuki Ignis S1600	13:10.5	(Sweden) Daniel Carlsson
Leg 1 (8 Aug)	SS6	Laukaa	11.82 km	(Finland) Ville-Pertti Teuronen	Suzuki Ignis S1600	6:40.6	(Sweden) Daniel Carlsson
Leg 1 (8 Aug)	SS7	Ruuhimäki	7.57 km	(Sweden) Daniel Carlsson	Suzuki Ignis S1600	4:41.7	(Sweden) Daniel Carlsson
Leg 1 (8 Aug)	SS8	Jukojärvi 2	22.31 km	(France) Brice Tirabassi	Renault Clio S1600	12:31.8	(France) Brice Tirabassi
Leg 1 (8 Aug)	SS9	Kruununperä 2	20.17 km	(Sweden) Daniel Carlsson	Suzuki Ignis S1600	10:30.3	(France) Brice Tirabassi
Leg 1 (8 Aug)	SS10	Killeri 2	2.06 km	(Sweden) Daniel Carlsson	Suzuki Ignis S1600	1:30.1	(France) Brice Tirabassi
Leg 2 (9 Aug)	SS11	Päijälä	21.95 km	(United Kingdom) Guy Wilks	Ford Puma S1600	12:55.6	(France) Brice Tirabassi
Leg 2 (9 Aug)	SS12	Ouninpohja 1	33.24 km	(Sweden) Daniel Carlsson (Finland) Kosti Katajamäki	Suzuki Ignis S1600; Volkswagen Polo S1600	17:39.2	(France) Brice Tirabassi
Leg 2 (9 Aug)	SS13	Urria	10.00 km	(Sweden) Daniel Carlsson	Suzuki Ignis S1600	5:25.3	(France) Brice Tirabassi
Leg 2 (9 Aug)	SS14	Ouninpohja 2	33.24 km	(Sweden) Daniel Carlsson	Suzuki Ignis S1600	17:30.6	(Sweden) Daniel Carlsson
Leg 2 (9 Aug)	SS15	Ehikki	14.91 km	(Sweden) Daniel Carlsson	Suzuki Ignis S1600	7:49.6	(Sweden) Daniel Carlsson
Leg 2 (9 Aug)	SS16	Moksi — Leustu	40.96 km	(Sweden) Daniel Carlsson (United Kingdom) Guy Wilks	Suzuki Ignis S1600; Ford Puma S1600	23:53.5	(Sweden) Daniel Carlsson
Leg 2 (9 Aug)	SS17	Himos	13.62 km	(Sweden) Daniel Carlsson	Suzuki Ignis S1600	8:35.2	(Sweden) Daniel Carlsson
Leg 3 (10 Aug)	SS18	Parkkola 1	19.88 km	(United Kingdom) Guy Wilks	Ford Puma S1600	11:14.1	(Sweden) Daniel Carlsson
Leg 3 (10 Aug)	SS19	Mökkiperä 1	13.96 km	(Sweden) Daniel Carlsson	Suzuki Ignis S1600	7:57.0	(Sweden) Daniel Carlsson
Leg 3 (10 Aug)	SS20	Palsankylä	25.46 km	(France) Brice Tirabassi	Renault Clio S1600	15:42.5	(Sweden) Daniel Carlsson
Leg 3 (10 Aug)	SS21	Kuohu	7.76 km	(Sweden) Oscar Svedlund	Volkswagen Polo S1600	4:16.7	(Sweden) Daniel Carlsson
Leg 3 (10 Aug)	SS22	Parkkola 2	19.88 km	(Sweden) Daniel Carlsson	Suzuki Ignis S1600	11:07.1	(Sweden) Daniel Carlsson
Leg 3 (10 Aug)	SS23	Mökkiperä 2	13.96 km	(Sweden) Daniel Carlsson	Suzuki Ignis S1600	7:51.2	(Sweden) Daniel Carlsson

==== Championship standings ====
Pos.	Drivers' championships		
Pos.	Move	Driver	Points
1		(France) Brice Tirabassi	28
2	5	(Sweden) Daniel Carlsson	18
3	1	(Spain) Salvador Cañellas Jr.	17
4	1	(Estonia) Urmo Aava	16
5		(United Kingdom) Guy Wilks	15
