= 2003 Rallye Sanremo =

11th round of the 2003 World Rally Championship

2003 Rallye Sanremo 45th Rallye Sanremo - Rallye d'Italia
Round 11 of the 2003 World Rally Championship season
← Previous event	Next event →
- Host country: Italy
- Rally base: Sanremo
- Dates run: October 3, 2003 – October 5, 2003
- Stages: 14 (387.36 km; 240.69 miles)
- Stage surface: Asphalt
- Overall distance: 1,375.86 km (854.92 miles)

Statistics
- Crews: 54 at start, 36 at finish

Overall results
- Overall winner: (France) Sébastien Loeb (Monaco) Daniel Elena (France) Citroën Total WRT; Citroën Xsara WRC

The 2003 Rallye Sanremo (formally the 45th Rallye Sanremo - Rallye d'Italia) was the eleventh round of the 2003 World Rally Championship. The race was held over three days between 3 October and 5 October 2003, and was based in Sanremo, Italy. Citroen's Sébastien Loeb won the race, his 4th win in the World Rally Championship.

== Background ==
=== Entry list ===
No.	Driver	Co-Driver	Entrant	Car	Tyre
World Rally Championship manufacturer entries
1	(Finland) Marcus Grönholm	(Finland) Timo Rautiainen	(France) Marlboro Peugeot Total	Peugeot 206 WRC	MI
2	(United Kingdom) Richard Burns	(United Kingdom) Robert Reid	(France) Marlboro Peugeot Total	Peugeot 206 WRC	MI
3	(France) Gilles Panizzi	(France) Hervé Panizzi	(France) Marlboro Peugeot Total	Peugeot 206 WRC	MI
4	(Estonia) Markko Märtin	(United Kingdom) Michael Park	(United Kingdom) Ford Motor Co. Ltd.	Ford Focus RS WRC '03	MI
5	(Belgium) François Duval	(Belgium) Stéphane Prévot	(United Kingdom) Ford Motor Co. Ltd.	Ford Focus RS WRC '03	MI
6	(Finland) Mikko Hirvonen	(Finland) Jarmo Lehtinen	(United Kingdom) Ford Motor Co. Ltd.	Ford Focus RS WRC '02	MI
7	(Norway) Petter Solberg	(United Kingdom) Phil Mills	(Japan) 555 Subaru World Rally Team	Subaru Impreza S9 WRC '03	P
8	(Finland) Tommi Mäkinen	(Finland) Kaj Lindström	(Japan) 555 Subaru World Rally Team	Subaru Impreza S9 WRC '03	P
14	(France) Didier Auriol	(France) Denis Giraudet	(Czech Republic) Škoda Motorsport	Škoda Fabia WRC	MI
15	(Finland) Toni Gardemeister	(Finland) Paavo Lukander	(Czech Republic) Škoda Motorsport	Škoda Fabia WRC	MI
17	(United Kingdom) Colin McRae	(United Kingdom) Derek Ringer	(France) Citroën Total WRT	Citroën Xsara WRC	MI
18	(France) Sébastien Loeb	(Monaco) Daniel Elena	(France) Citroën Total WRT	Citroën Xsara WRC	MI
19	(Spain) Carlos Sainz	(Spain) Marc Martí	(France) Citroën Total WRT	Citroën Xsara WRC	MI
20	(France) Philippe Bugalski	(France) Jean-Paul Chiaroni	(France) Citroën Total WRT	Citroën Xsara WRC	MI
World Rally Championship entries
22	(Czech Republic) Roman Kresta	(Czech Republic) Jan Tománek	(France) Bozian Racing	Peugeot 206 WRC	MI
23	(France) Cédric Robert	(France) Gérald Bedon	Equipe de France FFSA	Peugeot 206 WRC	MI
32	(Italy) Riccardo Errani	(Italy) Stefano Casadio	(Italy) Riccardo Errani	Škoda Octavia WRC	MI
JWRC entries
51	(San Marino) Mirco Baldacci	(Italy) Giovanni Bernacchini	(Italy) Purity Auto	Fiat Punto S1600	MI
52	(Sweden) Daniel Carlsson	(Sweden) Matthias Andersson	(Japan) Suzuki Sport	Suzuki Ignis S1600	MI
54	(Finland) Kosti Katajamäki	(Finland) Jani Laaksonen	(Germany) Volkswagen Racing	Volkswagen Polo S1600	MI
57	(Bulgaria) Dimitar Iliev	(Bulgaria) Yanaki Yanakiev	(Italy) Auto Sport Italia	Peugeot 206 S1600	MI
58	(Argentina) Marcos Ligato	(Argentina) Rubén García	(Italy) Top Run SRL	Fiat Punto S1600	MI
61	(France) Brice Tirabassi	(France) Jacques-Julien Renucci	(France) Renault Sport	Renault Clio S1600	MI
63	(Italy) Massimo Ceccato	(Italy) Mitia Dotta	(Italy) Top Run SRL	Fiat Punto S1600	MI
64	(Finland) Ville-Pertti Teuronen	(Finland) Harri Kaapro	(Japan) Suzuki Sport	Suzuki Ignis S1600	MI
65	(Lebanon) Abdo Feghali	(Lebanon) Joseph Matar	(Italy) Astra Racing	Ford Puma S1600	MI
67	(San Marino) Alessandro Broccoli	(Italy) Simona Girelli	(San Marino) Sab Motorsport	Renault Clio S1600	MI
69	(Spain) Salvador Cañellas Jr.	(Spain) Xavier Amigó	(Japan) Suzuki Sport	Suzuki Ignis S1600	MI
70	(United Kingdom) Guy Wilks	(United Kingdom) Phil Pugh	(United Kingdom) Ford Motor Co. Ltd.	Ford Puma S1600	MI
71	(Estonia) Urmo Aava	(Estonia) Kuldar Sikk	(Japan) Suzuki Sport	Suzuki Ignis S1600	MI
73	(Bulgaria) Krum Donchev	(Bulgaria) Ruman Manolov	(Italy) Auto Sport Italia	Peugeot 206 S1600	MI
74	(United Kingdom) Kris Meeke	(United Kingdom) Chris Patterson	(Germany) Opel Motorsport	Opel Corsa S1600	MI
76	(Italy) Luca Cecchettini	(Italy) Marco Muzzarelli	(Italy) Top Run SRL	Fiat Punto S1600	MI

=== Itinerary ===
All dates and times are CEST (UTC+2).

Date	Time	No.	Stage name	Distance
Leg 1 — 142.14 km
3 October	08:38	SS1	Perinaldo 1	12.40 km
3 October	09:26	SS2	Ceppo 1	36.42 km
3 October	12:25	SS3	Cosio 1	19.19 km
3 October	13:17	SS4	San Bartolomeo 1	25.31 km
3 October	15:54	SS5	Perinaldo 2	12.40 km
3 October	16:42	SS6	Ceppo 2	36.42 km
Leg 2 — 149.10 km
4 October	09:20	SS7	Teglia 1	52.30 km
4 October	12:26	SS8	Cosio 2	19.19 km
4 October	13:18	SS9	San Bartolomeo 2	25.31 km
4 October	15:52	SS10	Teglia 2	52.30 km
Leg 3 — 96.12 km
5 October	09:12	SS11	Vignai 1	26.54 km
5 October	09:54	SS12	Colle d'Oggia 1	21.52 km
5 October	12:28	SS13	Vignai 2	26.54 km
5 October	13:10	SS14	Colle d'Oggia 2	21.52 km

== Results ==
=== Overall ===
Pos.	No.	Driver	Co-driver	Team	Car	Time	Difference	Points
1	18	(France) Sébastien Loeb	(Monaco) Daniel Elena	(France) Citroën Total WRT	Citroën Xsara WRC	4:16:33.7		10
2	3	(France) Gilles Panizzi	(France) Hervé Panizzi	(France) Marlboro Peugeot Total	Peugeot 206 WRC	4:17:02.0	+28.3	8
3	4	(Estonia) Markko Märtin	(United Kingdom) Michael Park	(United Kingdom) Ford Motor Co. Ltd.	Ford Focus RS WRC '03	4:17:28.3	+54.6	6
4	19	(Spain) Carlos Sainz	(Spain) Marc Martí	(France) Citroën Total WRT	Citroën Xsara WRC	4:19:06.9	+2:33.2	5
5	5	(Belgium) François Duval	(Belgium) Stéphane Prévot	(United Kingdom) Ford Motor Co. Ltd.	Ford Focus RS WRC '03	4:20:32.6	+3:58.9	4
6	17	(United Kingdom) Colin McRae	(United Kingdom) Derek Ringer	(France) Citroën Total WRT	Citroën Xsara WRC	4:20:57.5	+4:23.8	3
7	2	(United Kingdom) Richard Burns	(United Kingdom) Robert Reid	(France) Marlboro Peugeot Total	Peugeot 206 WRC	4:23:43.2	+7:09.5	2
8	20	(France) Philippe Bugalski	(France) Jean-Paul Chiaroni	(France) Citroën Total WRT	Citroën Xsara WRC	4:23:46.3	+7:12.6	1

=== World Rally Cars ===
==== Classification ====
Position		No.	Driver	Co-driver	Entrant	Car	Time	Difference	Points
Event	Class	No.	Driver	Co-driver	Entrant	Car	Time	Difference	Points
1	1	18	(France) Sébastien Loeb	(Monaco) Daniel Elena	(France) Citroën Total WRT	Citroën Xsara WRC	4:16:33.7		10
2	2	3	(France) Gilles Panizzi	(France) Hervé Panizzi	(France) Marlboro Peugeot Total	Peugeot 206 WRC	4:17:02.0	+28.3	8
3	3	4	(Estonia) Markko Märtin	(United Kingdom) Michael Park	(United Kingdom) Ford Motor Co. Ltd.	Ford Focus RS WRC '03	4:17:28.3	+54.6	6
4	4	19	(Spain) Carlos Sainz	(Spain) Marc Martí	(France) Citroën Total WRT	Citroën Xsara WRC	4:19:06.9	+2:33.2	5
5	5	5	(Belgium) François Duval	(Belgium) Stéphane Prévot	(United Kingdom) Ford Motor Co. Ltd.	Ford Focus RS WRC '03	4:20:32.6	+3:58.9	4
6	6	17	(United Kingdom) Colin McRae	(United Kingdom) Derek Ringer	(France) Citroën Total WRT	Citroën Xsara WRC	4:20:57.5	+4:23.8	3
7	7	2	(United Kingdom) Richard Burns	(United Kingdom) Robert Reid	(France) Marlboro Peugeot Total	Peugeot 206 WRC	4:23:43.2	+7:09.5	2
8	8	20	(France) Philippe Bugalski	(France) Jean-Paul Chiaroni	(France) Citroën Total WRT	Citroën Xsara WRC	4:23:46.3	+7:12.6	1
10	9	8	(Finland) Tommi Mäkinen	(Finland) Kaj Lindström	(Japan) 555 Subaru World Rally Team	Subaru Impreza S9 WRC '03	4:24:05.9	+7:32.2	0
12	10	14	(France) Didier Auriol	(France) Denis Giraudet	(Czech Republic) Škoda Motorsport	Škoda Fabia WRC	4:31:22.8	+14:49.1	0
Retired SS14		1	(Finland) Marcus Grönholm	(Finland) Timo Rautiainen	(France) Marlboro Peugeot Total	Peugeot 206 WRC	Lost wheel		0
Retired SS7		7	(Norway) Petter Solberg	(United Kingdom) Phil Mills	(Japan) 555 Subaru World Rally Team	Subaru Impreza S9 WRC '03	No fuel		0
Retired SS4		6	(Finland) Mikko Hirvonen	(Finland) Jarmo Lehtinen	(United Kingdom) Ford Motor Co. Ltd.	Ford Focus RS WRC '02	Timing belt		0
Retired SS2		15	(Finland) Toni Gardemeister	(Finland) Paavo Lukander	(Czech Republic) Škoda Motorsport	Škoda Fabia WRC	Accident		0

==== Special stages ====
Day	Stage	Stage name	Length	Winner	Car	Time	Class leaders
Leg 1 (3 Oct)	SS1	Perinaldo 1	12.40 km	(France) Sébastien Loeb	Citroën Xsara WRC	7:56.2	(France) Sébastien Loeb
Leg 1 (3 Oct)	SS2	Ceppo 1	36.42 km	(France) Sébastien Loeb	Citroën Xsara WRC	24:05.5	(France) Sébastien Loeb
Leg 1 (3 Oct)	SS3	Cosio 1	19.19 km	(Estonia) Markko Märtin	Ford Focus RS WRC '03	11:56.3	(France) Sébastien Loeb
Leg 1 (3 Oct)	SS4	San Bartolomeo 1	25.31 km	(Estonia) Markko Märtin	Ford Focus RS WRC '03	14:47.2	(France) Sébastien Loeb
Leg 1 (3 Oct)	SS5	Perinaldo 2	12.40 km	(Estonia) Markko Märtin	Ford Focus RS WRC '03	7:45.6	(France) Sébastien Loeb
Leg 1 (3 Oct)	SS6	Ceppo 2	36.42 km	(France) Sébastien Loeb	Citroën Xsara WRC	23:38.7	(France) Sébastien Loeb
Leg 2 (4 Oct)	SS7	Teglia 1	52.30 km	(Estonia) Markko Märtin	Ford Focus RS WRC '03	35:01.7	(France) Sébastien Loeb
Leg 2 (4 Oct)	SS8	Cosio 2	19.19 km	(Estonia) Markko Märtin	Ford Focus RS WRC '03	11:51.3	(France) Sébastien Loeb
Leg 2 (4 Oct)	SS9	San Bartolomeo 2	25.31 km	(Estonia) Markko Märtin	Ford Focus RS WRC '03	14:44.2	(France) Sébastien Loeb
Leg 2 (4 Oct)	SS10	Teglia 2	52.30 km	(Estonia) Markko Märtin	Ford Focus RS WRC '03	34:48.6	(France) Sébastien Loeb
Leg 3 (5 Oct)	SS11	Vignai 1	26.54 km	(France) Sébastien Loeb	Citroën Xsara WRC	18:00.7	(France) Sébastien Loeb
Leg 3 (5 Oct)	SS12	Colle d'Oggia 1	21.52 km	(Estonia) Markko Märtin	Ford Focus RS WRC '03	13:58.7	(France) Sébastien Loeb
Leg 3 (5 Oct)	SS13	Vignai 2	26.54 km	(France) Gilles Panizzi	Peugeot 206 WRC	19:42.6	(France) Sébastien Loeb
Leg 3 (5 Oct)	SS14	Colle d'Oggia 2	21.52 km	(France) Gilles Panizzi	Peugeot 206 WRC	15:59.6	(France) Sébastien Loeb

==== Championship standings ====
Pos.	Drivers' championships			Co-drivers' championships			Manufacturers' championships		
Pos.	Move	Driver	Points	Move	Co-driver	Points	Move	Manufacturer	Points
1		(United Kingdom) Richard Burns	57		(United Kingdom) Robert Reid	57	1	(France) Citroën Total WRT	125
2	2	(France) Sébastien Loeb	55	2	(Monaco) Daniel Elena	55	1	(France) Marlboro Peugeot Total	121
3		(Spain) Carlos Sainz	53		(Spain) Marc Martí	53		(Japan) 555 Subaru World Rally Team	76
4	2	(Norway) Petter Solberg	48	2	(United Kingdom) Phil Mills	48		(United Kingdom) Ford Motor Co. Ltd.	71
5	1	(Estonia) Markko Märtin	43	1	(United Kingdom) Michael Park	43		(Czech Republic) Škoda Motorsport	21

=== Junior World Rally Championship ===
==== Classification ====
Position		No.	Driver	Co-driver	Entrant	Car	Time	Difference	Points
Event	Class	No.	Driver	Co-driver	Entrant	Car	Time	Difference	Points
16	1	51	(San Marino) Mirco Baldacci	(Italy) Giovanni Bernacchini	(Italy) Purity Auto	Fiat Punto S1600	4:43:22.6		10
18	2	69	(Spain) Salvador Cañellas Jr.	(Spain) Xavier Amigó	(Japan) Suzuki Sport	Suzuki Ignis S1600	4:48:44.4	+5:21.8	8
21	3	57	(Bulgaria) Dimitar Iliev	(Bulgaria) Yanaki Yanakiev	(Italy) Auto Sport Italia	Peugeot 206 S1600	4:50:02.1	+6:39.5	6
23	4	64	(Finland) Ville-Pertti Teuronen	(Finland) Harri Kaapro	(Japan) Suzuki Sport	Suzuki Ignis S1600	4:52:01.8	+8:39.2	5
25	5	76	(Italy) Luca Cecchettini	(Italy) Marco Muzzarelli	(Italy) Top Run SRL	Fiat Punto S1600	4:55:07.8	+11:45.2	4
28	6	70	(United Kingdom) Guy Wilks	(United Kingdom) Phil Pugh	(United Kingdom) Ford Motor Co. Ltd.	Ford Puma S1600	5:00:33.0	+17:10.4	3
32	7	65	(Lebanon) Abdo Feghali	(Lebanon) Joseph Matar	(Italy) Astra Racing	Ford Puma S1600	5:02:40.6	+19:18.0	2
Retired SS11		54	(Finland) Kosti Katajamäki	(Finland) Jani Laaksonen	(Germany) Volkswagen Racing	Volkswagen Polo S1600	Driveshaft		0
Retired SS11		74	(United Kingdom) Kris Meeke	(United Kingdom) Chris Patterson	(Germany) Opel Motorsport	Opel Corsa S1600	Accident		0
Retired SS10		63	(Italy) Massimo Ceccato	(Italy) Mitia Dotta	(Italy) Top Run SRL	Fiat Punto S1600	Accident		0
Retired SS10		67	(San Marino) Alessandro Broccoli	(Italy) Simona Girelli	(San Marino) Sab Motorsport	Renault Clio S1600	Accident		0
Retired SS7		52	(Sweden) Daniel Carlsson	(Sweden) Matthias Andersson	(Japan) Suzuki Sport	Suzuki Ignis S1600	Accident		0
Retired SS7		58	(Argentina) Marcos Ligato	(Argentina) Rubén García	(Italy) Top Run SRL	Fiat Punto S1600	Accident		0
Retired SS7		61	(France) Brice Tirabassi	(France) Jacques-Julien Renucci	(France) Renault Sport	Renault Clio S1600	Electrical		0
Retired SS6		71	(Estonia) Urmo Aava	(Estonia) Kuldar Sikk	(Japan) Suzuki Sport	Suzuki Ignis S1600	Driveshaft		0
Retired SS2		73	(Bulgaria) Krum Donchev	(Bulgaria) Ruman Manolov	(Italy) Auto Sport Italia	Peugeot 206 S1600	Accident		0

==== Special stages ====
Day	Stage	Stage name	Length	Winner	Car	Time	Class leaders
Leg 1 (3 Oct)	SS1	Perinaldo 1	12.40 km	(France) Brice Tirabassi	Renault Clio S1600	8:42.1	(France) Brice Tirabassi
Leg 1 (3 Oct)	SS2	Ceppo 1	36.42 km	(San Marino) Mirco Baldacci	Fiat Punto S1600	26:34.0	(San Marino) Mirco Baldacci
Leg 1 (3 Oct)	SS3	Cosio 1	19.19 km	(France) Brice Tirabassi	Renault Clio S1600	13:19.9	(San Marino) Mirco Baldacci
Leg 1 (3 Oct)	SS4	San Bartolomeo 1	25.31 km	(San Marino) Mirco Baldacci	Fiat Punto S1600	16:20.1	(San Marino) Mirco Baldacci
Leg 1 (3 Oct)	SS5	Perinaldo 2	12.40 km	(San Marino) Mirco Baldacci	Fiat Punto S1600	8:37.2	(San Marino) Mirco Baldacci
Leg 1 (3 Oct)	SS6	Ceppo 2	36.42 km	(San Marino) Mirco Baldacci	Fiat Punto S1600	26:49.6	(San Marino) Mirco Baldacci
Leg 2 (4 Oct)	SS7	Teglia 1	52.30 km	(Italy) Massimo Ceccato	Fiat Punto S1600	39:06.4	(San Marino) Mirco Baldacci
Leg 2 (4 Oct)	SS8	Cosio 2	19.19 km	(Spain) Salvador Cañellas Jr.	Suzuki Ignis S1600	13:15.8	(San Marino) Mirco Baldacci
Leg 2 (4 Oct)	SS9	San Bartolomeo 2	25.31 km	(San Marino) Mirco Baldacci	Fiat Punto S1600	16:22.0	(San Marino) Mirco Baldacci
Leg 2 (4 Oct)	SS10	Teglia 2	52.30 km	(San Marino) Mirco Baldacci	Fiat Punto S1600	38:54.6	(San Marino) Mirco Baldacci
Leg 3 (5 Oct)	SS11	Vignai 1	26.54 km	Notional stage time			(San Marino) Mirco Baldacci
Leg 3 (5 Oct)	SS12	Colle d'Oggia 1	21.52 km	Notional stage time			(San Marino) Mirco Baldacci
Leg 3 (5 Oct)	SS13	Vignai 2	26.54 km	(Spain) Salvador Cañellas Jr.	Suzuki Ignis S1600	21:45.6	(San Marino) Mirco Baldacci
Leg 3 (5 Oct)	SS14	Colle d'Oggia 2	21.52 km	(Lebanon) Abdo Feghali	Ford Puma S1600	17:21.3	(San Marino) Mirco Baldacci

==== Championship standings ====
Pos.	Drivers' championships		
Pos.	Move	Driver	Points
1		(France) Brice Tirabassi	28
2	1	(Spain) Salvador Cañellas Jr.	25
3	1	(Sweden) Daniel Carlsson	18
4	1	(United Kingdom) Guy Wilks	18
5	1	(Estonia) Urmo Aava	16
