= Stéphane Prévot =

Belgian rally co-driver (born 1969)

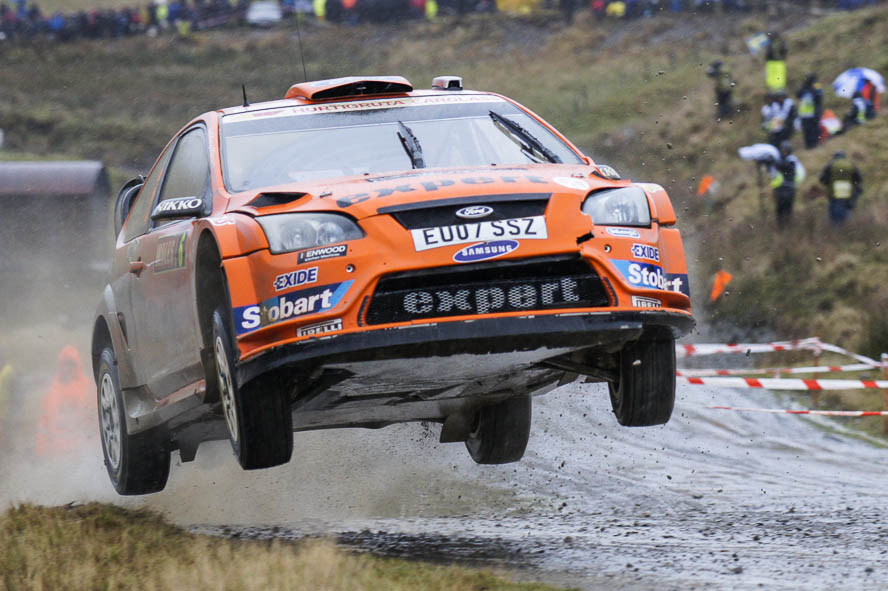

Personal information
- Nationality: (Belgium) Belgian
- Born: 7 January 1969 (age 57)

World Rally Championship record
- Years active: 1989, 1991–2015, 2021–2022, 2026
- Driver: (Belgium) Georges Simons (Belgium) Bruno Thiry (France) Pierre Colard (Belgium) Joost Boxoen (Belgium) Bernard Munster (Belgium) François Duval (France) Stéphane Sarrazin (Australia) Chris Atkinson (Cyprus) Nicos Thomas (Russia) Evgeny Novikov (Norway) Henning Solberg (United Kingdom) Richard Tuthill (France) Stéphane Lefebvre (Belgium) Cédric Cherain (France) Frédéric Rosati (Belgium) Emile Breittmayer
- Teams: Citroen World Rally Team; PH Sport; Hyundai Motorsport; WRC Team Mini Portugal; Qatar World Rally Team; Monster World Rally Team; M-Sport World Rally Team; Citroen Junior Team; Subaru World Rally Team; Bastos Racing Team; Skoda Motorsport; H.F Grifone SRL; Gazprom Rally Team; Ford World Rally Team
- Rallies: 179
- Rally wins: 0
- Podiums: 17
- Stage wins: 78
- First rally: 1989 RAC Rally
- Last rally: 2026 Rally Sweden

Stéphane Prévot is a Belgian rally co-driver.

Prévot was born in Huy. He has codriven for 74 rally drivers, including Bruno Thiry, François Duval and Chris Atkinson.
