= 2002 Cyprus Rally =

5th round of the 2002 World Rally Championship

2002 Cyprus Rally 30th Cyprus Rally
Round 5 of the 2002 World Rally Championship season
← Previous event	Next event →
- Host country: Cyprus
- Rally base: Limassol
- Dates run: April 19, 2002 – April 21, 2002
- Stages: 20 (324.17 km; 201.43 miles)
- Stage surface: Gravel
- Overall distance: 1,276.33 km (793.07 miles)

Statistics
- Crews: 60 at start, 32 at finish

Overall results
- Overall winner: (Finland) Marcus Grönholm (Finland) Timo Rautiainen (France) Peugeot Total; Peugeot 206 WRC

The 2002 Cyprus Rally (formally the 30th Cyprus Rally) was the fifth round of the 2002 World Rally Championship. The race was held over three days between 19 April and 21 April 2002, and was won by Peugeot's Marcus Grönholm, his 9th win in the World Rally Championship.

== Background ==
=== Entry list ===
No.	Driver	Co-Driver	Entrant	Car	Tyre
World Rally Championship manufacturer entries
1	(United Kingdom) Richard Burns	(United Kingdom) Robert Reid	(France) Peugeot Total	Peugeot 206 WRC	MI
2	(Finland) Marcus Grönholm	(Finland) Timo Rautiainen	(France) Peugeot Total	Peugeot 206 WRC	MI
3	(Finland) Harri Rovanperä	(Finland) Risto Pietiläinen	(France) Peugeot Total	Peugeot 206 WRC	MI
4	(Spain) Carlos Sainz	(Spain) Luis Moya	(United Kingdom) Ford Motor Co. Ltd.	Ford Focus RS WRC '02	P
5	(United Kingdom) Colin McRae	(United Kingdom) Nicky Grist	(United Kingdom) Ford Motor Co. Ltd.	Ford Focus RS WRC '02	P
6	(Estonia) Markko Märtin	(United Kingdom) Michael Park	(United Kingdom) Ford Motor Co. Ltd.	Ford Focus RS WRC '02	P
7	(France) François Delecour	(France) Daniel Grataloup	(Japan) Marlboro Mitsubishi Ralliart	Mitsubishi Lancer WRC	MI
8	(United Kingdom) Alister McRae	(United Kingdom) David Senior	(Japan) Marlboro Mitsubishi Ralliart	Mitsubishi Lancer WRC	MI
9	(Finland) Jani Paasonen	(Finland) Arto Kapanen	(Japan) Marlboro Mitsubishi Ralliart	Mitsubishi Lancer WRC	MI
10	(Finland) Tommi Mäkinen	(Finland) Kaj Lindström	(Japan) 555 Subaru World Rally Team	Subaru Impreza S7 WRC '01	P
11	(Norway) Petter Solberg	(United Kingdom) Phil Mills	(Japan) 555 Subaru World Rally Team	Subaru Impreza S8 WRC '02	P
14	(Sweden) Kenneth Eriksson	(Sweden) Tina Thörner	(Czech Republic) Škoda Motorsport	Škoda Octavia WRC Evo2	MI
15	(Finland) Toni Gardemeister	(Finland) Paavo Lukander	(Czech Republic) Škoda Motorsport	Škoda Octavia WRC Evo2	MI
16	(Czech Republic) Roman Kresta	(Czech Republic) Jan Tománek	(Czech Republic) Škoda Motorsport	Škoda Octavia WRC Evo2	MI
17	(Germany) Armin Schwarz	(Germany) Manfred Hiemer	(South Korea) Hyundai Castrol World Rally Team	Hyundai Accent WRC3	MI
18	(Belgium) Freddy Loix	(Belgium) Sven Smeets	(South Korea) Hyundai Castrol World Rally Team	Hyundai Accent WRC3	MI
19	(Finland) Juha Kankkunen	(Finland) Juha Repo	(South Korea) Hyundai Castrol World Rally Team	Hyundai Accent WRC3	MI
World Rally Championship entries
23	(France) Gilles Panizzi	(France) Hervé Panizzi	(France) Peugeot Total	Peugeot 206 WRC	MI
24	(Belgium) François Duval	(Belgium) Jean-Marc Fortin	(Belgium) François Duval	Ford Focus RS WRC '02	P
25	(Belgium) Bruno Thiry	(Belgium) Stéphane Prévot	(Belgium) Peugeot Bastos Racing	Peugeot 206 WRC	MI
26	(Austria) Achim Mörtl	(Germany) Klaus Wicha	(Austria) Powerhorse World Rally Team	Peugeot 206 WRC	MI
27	(Poland) Tomasz Kuchar	(Poland) Maciej Szczepaniak	(South Korea) Hyundai Castrol World Rally Team	Hyundai Accent WRC3	MI
28	(Argentina) Gabriel Pozzo	(Argentina) Daniel Stillo	(Argentina) Gabriel Pozzo	Škoda Octavia WRC	—N/a
29	(Finland) Janne Tuohino	(Finland) Petri Vihavainen	(Finland) Janne Tuohino	Ford Focus RS WRC '01	—N/a
30	(Austria) Manfred Stohl	(Austria) Ilka Minor	(Austria) Stohl Racing	Ford Focus RS WRC '01	P
31	(Finland) Juuso Pykälistö	(Finland) Esko Mertsalmi	(Finland) Juuso Pykälistö	Toyota Corolla WRC	—N/a
32	(Greece) Ioannis Papadimitriou	(United Kingdom) Allan Harryman	(Greece) Ioannis Papadimitriou	Subaru Impreza 555	P
103	(Cyprus) Andreas Tsouloftas	(Cyprus) Panayiotis Shialos	(Cyprus) Andreas Tsouloftas	Mitsubishi Lancer Evo VI	—N/a
104	(Cyprus) Chris Thomas	(Cyprus) Andreas Christodoulides	(Cyprus) Chris Thomas	Subaru Impreza S5 WRC '98	—N/a
111	(Cyprus) Kyriakos Kardanas	(Cyprus) Costas Laos	(Cyprus) Kyriakos Kardanas	Mitsubishi Carisma GT	—N/a
113	(Italy) Riccardo Errani	(Italy) Stefano Casadio	(Italy) Riccardo Errani	Subaru Impreza WRX	—N/a
PWRC entries
51	(Uruguay) Gustavo Trelles	(Argentina) Jorge Del Buono	(Italy) Mauro Rally Tuning	Mitsubishi Lancer Evo VI	P
52	(Argentina) Marcos Ligato	(Argentina) Rubén García	(Italy) Top Run SRL	Mitsubishi Lancer Evo VII	—N/a
53	(Italy) Alessandro Fiorio	(Italy) Enrico Cantoni	(Italy) Ralliart Italia	Mitsubishi Lancer Evo VII	—N/a
54	(Peru) Ramón Ferreyros	(Spain) Diego Vallejo	(Italy) Mauro Rally Tuning	Mitsubishi Lancer Evo VI	—N/a
55	(Lithuania) Saulius Girdauskas	(Lithuania) Žilvinas Sakalauskas	(Lithuania) TDS Racing	Mitsubishi Lancer Evo VI	—N/a
57	(Japan) Toshihiro Arai	(New Zealand) Tony Sircombe	(Japan) Spike Subaru Team	Subaru Impreza WRX	—N/a
58	(Italy) Luca Baldini	(Italy) Marco Muzzarelli	(Italy) Top Run SRL	Mitsubishi Lancer Evo VI	—N/a
59	(United Kingdom) Natalie Barratt	(United Kingdom) Roger Freeman	(United Kingdom) Natalie Barratt Rallysport	Mitsubishi Lancer Evo VI	—N/a
65	(Austria) Beppo Harrach	(Austria) Jutta Gebert	(Austria) Stohl Racing	Mitsubishi Lancer Evo VI	—N/a
66	(Bulgaria) Dimitar Iliev	(Bulgaria) Petar Sivov	(Italy) Mauro Rally Tuning	Mitsubishi Lancer Evo VII	P
69	(Norway) Bernt Kollevold	(Norway) Ola Fløene	(Norway) Kollevold Rally Team	Mitsubishi Lancer Evo VI	—N/a
70	(Italy) Giovanni Manfrinato	(Italy) Claudio Condotta	(Italy) Top Run SRL	Mitsubishi Lancer Evo VI	—N/a
71	(Italy) Stefano Marrini	(Italy) Tiziana Sandroni	(Italy) Top Run SRL	Mitsubishi Lancer Evo VI	—N/a
73	(United Kingdom) Martin Rowe	(United Kingdom) Chris Wood	(United Kingdom) David Sutton Cars Ltd	Mitsubishi Lancer Evo VII	—N/a
74	(Malaysia) Karamjit Singh	(Malaysia) Allen Oh	(Malaysia) Petronas EON Racing Team	Proton Pert	—N/a
75	(Finland) Kristian Sohlberg	(Finland) Jukka Aho	(Finland) Blue Rose Team	Mitsubishi Lancer Evo VI	—N/a
76	(Czech Republic) Pavel Valoušek	(Italy) Pierangelo Scalvini	(Italy) Jolly Club	Mitsubishi Lancer Evo VII	—N/a
77	(Italy) Alfredo De Dominicis	(Italy) Rudy Pollet	Ralliart Italy	Mitsubishi Lancer Evo VII	—N/a

=== Itinerary ===
All dates and times are EEST (UTC+3).

Date	Time	No.	Stage name	Distance
Leg 1 — 96.32 km
19 April	09:12	SS1	Platres — Kato Amiantos 1	11.60 km
19 April	09:55	SS2	Lagoudera — Kapouras 1	15.00 km
19 April	10:23	SS3	Kapouras — Agios Theodoros 1	21.56 km
19 April	13:30	SS4	Platres — Kato Amiantos 2	11.60 km
19 April	14:13	SS5	Lagoudera — Kapouras 2	15.00 km
19 April	14:41	SS6	Kapouras — Agios Theodoros 2	21.56 km
Leg 2 — 145.97 km
20 April	14:41	SS7	Prastio — Pachna 1	10.92 km
20 April	08:15	SS8	Platres — Saittas 1	11.25 km
20 April	08:58	SS9	Kourdali — Spilia	30.62 km
20 April	11:48	SS10	Prastio — Pachna 2	10.92 km
20 April	12:51	SS11	Platres — Saittas 2	11.25 km
20 April	13:26	SS12	Foini — Koilinia 1	29.88 km
20 April	16:56	SS13	Platres — Saittas 3	11.25 km
20 April	17:31	SS14	Foini — Koilinia 2	29.88 km
Leg 3 — 81.88 km
21 April	09:35	SS15	Vavatsinia — Mandra Kambiou 1	19.00 km
21 April	10:18	SS16	Macheras — Agioi Vavatsinias 1	12.80 km
21 April	10:56	SS17	Lageia — Kalavasos 1	9.14 km
21 April	13:46	SS18	Vavatsinia — Mandra Kambiou 2	19.00 km
21 April	14:29	SS19	Macheras — Agioi Vavatsinias 2	12.80 km
21 April	15:07	SS20	Lageia — Kalavasos 2	9.14 km

== Results ==
=== Overall ===
Pos.	No.	Driver	Co-driver	Team	Car	Time	Difference	Points
1	2	(Finland) Marcus Grönholm	(Finland) Timo Rautiainen	(France) Peugeot Total	Peugeot 206 WRC	4:21:25.7		10
2	1	(United Kingdom) Richard Burns	(United Kingdom) Robert Reid	(France) Peugeot Total	Peugeot 206 WRC	4:22:22.5	+56.8	6
3	10	(Finland) Tommi Mäkinen	(Finland) Kaj Lindström	(Japan) 555 Subaru World Rally Team	Subaru Impreza S7 WRC '01	4:22:24.7	+59.0	4
4	3	(Finland) Harri Rovanperä	(Finland) Risto Pietiläinen	(France) Peugeot Total	Peugeot 206 WRC	4:22:44.4	+1:18.7	3
5	11	(Norway) Petter Solberg	(United Kingdom) Phil Mills	(Japan) 555 Subaru World Rally Team	Subaru Impreza S8 WRC '02	4:23:43.6	+2:17.9	2
6	5	(United Kingdom) Colin McRae	(United Kingdom) Nicky Grist	(United Kingdom) Ford Motor Co. Ltd.	Ford Focus RS WRC '02	4:24:11.2	+2:45.5	1

=== World Rally Cars ===
==== Classification ====
Position		No.	Driver	Co-driver	Entrant	Car	Time	Difference	Points
Event	Class	No.	Driver	Co-driver	Entrant	Car	Time	Difference	Points
1	1	2	(Finland) Marcus Grönholm	(Finland) Timo Rautiainen	(France) Peugeot Total	Peugeot 206 WRC	4:21:25.7		10
2	2	1	(United Kingdom) Richard Burns	(United Kingdom) Robert Reid	(France) Peugeot Total	Peugeot 206 WRC	4:22:22.5	+56.8	6
3	3	10	(Finland) Tommi Mäkinen	(Finland) Kaj Lindström	(Japan) 555 Subaru World Rally Team	Subaru Impreza S7 WRC '01	4:22:24.7	+59.0	4
4	4	3	(Finland) Harri Rovanperä	(Finland) Risto Pietiläinen	(France) Peugeot Total	Peugeot 206 WRC	4:22:44.4	+1:18.7	3
5	5	11	(Norway) Petter Solberg	(United Kingdom) Phil Mills	(Japan) 555 Subaru World Rally Team	Subaru Impreza S8 WRC '02	4:23:43.6	+2:17.9	2
6	6	5	(United Kingdom) Colin McRae	(United Kingdom) Nicky Grist	(United Kingdom) Ford Motor Co. Ltd.	Ford Focus RS WRC '02	4:24:11.2	+2:45.5	1
7	7	17	(Germany) Armin Schwarz	(Germany) Manfred Hiemer	(South Korea) Hyundai Castrol World Rally Team	Hyundai Accent WRC3	4:24:13.1	+2:47.4	0
8	8	6	(Estonia) Markko Märtin	(United Kingdom) Michael Park	(United Kingdom) Ford Motor Co. Ltd.	Ford Focus RS WRC '02	4:25:48.3	+4:22.6	0
9	9	14	(Sweden) Kenneth Eriksson	(Sweden) Tina Thörner	(Czech Republic) Škoda Motorsport	Škoda Octavia WRC Evo2	4:28:43.4	+7:17.7	0
11	10	4	(Spain) Carlos Sainz	(Spain) Luis Moya	(United Kingdom) Ford Motor Co. Ltd.	Ford Focus RS WRC '02	4:30:19.7	+8:54.0	0
13	11	7	(France) François Delecour	(France) Daniel Grataloup	(Japan) Marlboro Mitsubishi Ralliart	Mitsubishi Lancer WRC	4:33:43.0	+12:17.3	0
15	12	15	(Finland) Toni Gardemeister	(Finland) Paavo Lukander	(Czech Republic) Škoda Motorsport	Škoda Octavia WRC Evo2	4:43:37.7	+22:12.0	0
Retired SS12		8	(United Kingdom) Alister McRae	(United Kingdom) David Senior	(Japan) Marlboro Mitsubishi Ralliart	Mitsubishi Lancer WRC	Transmission		0
Retired SS12		16	(Czech Republic) Roman Kresta	(Czech Republic) Jan Tománek	(Czech Republic) Škoda Motorsport	Škoda Octavia WRC Evo2	Accident		0
Retired SS12		18	(Belgium) Freddy Loix	(Belgium) Sven Smeets	(South Korea) Hyundai Castrol World Rally Team	Hyundai Accent WRC3	Gearbox		0
Retired SS7		9	(Finland) Jani Paasonen	(Finland) Arto Kapanen	(Japan) Marlboro Mitsubishi Ralliart	Mitsubishi Lancer WRC	Accident		0
Retired SS5		19	(Finland) Juha Kankkunen	(Finland) Juha Repo	(South Korea) Hyundai Castrol World Rally Team	Hyundai Accent WRC3	Oil leak		0

==== Special stages ====
Day	Stage	Stage name	Length	Winner	Car	Time	Class leaders
Leg 1 (19 Apr)	SS1	Platres — Kato Amiantos 1	11.60 km	(United Kingdom) Colin McRae	Ford Focus RS WRC '02	9:20.8	(United Kingdom) Colin McRae
Leg 1 (19 Apr)	SS2	Lagoudera — Kapouras 1	15.00 km	(Belgium) François Duval	Ford Focus RS WRC '02	14:18.5	(Belgium) François Duval
Leg 1 (19 Apr)	SS3	Kapouras — Agios Theodoros 1	21.56 km	(Estonia) Markko Märtin	Ford Focus RS WRC '02	20:16.6	(Estonia) Markko Märtin
Leg 1 (19 Apr)	SS4	Platres — Kato Amiantos 2	11.60 km	(Norway) Petter Solberg	Subaru Impreza S8 WRC '02	9:21.7	(United Kingdom) Colin McRae
Leg 1 (19 Apr)	SS5	Lagoudera — Kapouras 2	15.00 km	(Finland) Tommi Mäkinen	Subaru Impreza S8 WRC '01	14:11.7	(United Kingdom) Colin McRae
Leg 1 (19 Apr)	SS6	Kapouras — Agios Theodoros 2	21.56 km	(United Kingdom) Colin McRae	Ford Focus RS WRC '02	19:51.5	(United Kingdom) Colin McRae
Leg 2 (20 Apr)	SS7	Prastio — Pachna 1	10.92 km	(Spain) Carlos Sainz	Ford Focus RS WRC '02	6:29.0	(United Kingdom) Colin McRae
Leg 2 (20 Apr)	SS8	Platres — Saittas 1	11.25 km	(Spain) Carlos Sainz	Ford Focus RS WRC '02	9:21.2	(United Kingdom) Colin McRae
Leg 2 (20 Apr)	SS9	Kourdali — Spilia	30.62 km	(Finland) Tommi Mäkinen	Subaru Impreza S8 WRC '01	29:21.8	(United Kingdom) Colin McRae
Leg 2 (20 Apr)	SS10	Prastio — Pachna 2	10.92 km	(Norway) Petter Solberg	Subaru Impreza S8 WRC '02	6:14.3	(United Kingdom) Colin McRae
Leg 2 (20 Apr)	SS11	Platres — Saittas 2	11.25 km	(Norway) Petter Solberg	Subaru Impreza S8 WRC '02	9:02.7	(United Kingdom) Colin McRae
Leg 2 (20 Apr)	SS12	Foini — Koilinia 1	29.88 km	(Norway) Petter Solberg	Subaru Impreza S8 WRC '02	29:31.3	(United Kingdom) Colin McRae
Leg 2 (20 Apr)	SS13	Platres — Saittas 3	11.25 km	(Norway) Petter Solberg	Subaru Impreza S8 WRC '02	9:24.6	(United Kingdom) Colin McRae
Leg 2 (20 Apr)	SS14	Foini — Koilinia 2	29.88 km	Stage cancelled			(United Kingdom) Colin McRae
Leg 3 (21 Apr)	SS15	Vavatsinia — Mandra Kambiou 1	19.00 km	(Finland) Harri Rovanperä	Peugeot 206 WRC	16:34.9	(United Kingdom) Colin McRae
Leg 3 (21 Apr)	SS16	Macheras — Agioi Vavatsinias 1	12.80 km	(Finland) Tommi Mäkinen	Subaru Impreza S8 WRC '01	10:55.8	(Finland) Marcus Grönholm
Leg 3 (21 Apr)	SS17	Lageia — Kalavasos 1	9.14 km	(Finland) Tommi Mäkinen	Subaru Impreza S8 WRC '01	7:41.0	(Finland) Marcus Grönholm
Leg 3 (21 Apr)	SS18	Vavatsinia — Mandra Kambiou 2	19.00 km	(Norway) Petter Solberg	Subaru Impreza S8 WRC '02	17:02.1	(Finland) Marcus Grönholm
Leg 3 (21 Apr)	SS19	Macheras — Agioi Vavatsinias 2	12.80 km	(Finland) Tommi Mäkinen	Subaru Impreza S8 WRC '01	11:16.7	(Finland) Marcus Grönholm
Leg 3 (21 Apr)	SS20	Lageia — Kalavasos 2	9.14 km	(United Kingdom) Richard Burns	Peugeot 206 WRC	7:37.3	(Finland) Marcus Grönholm

==== Championship standings ====
Pos.	Drivers' championships			Co-drivers' championships			Manufacturers' championships		
Pos.	Move	Driver	Points	Move	Co-driver	Points	Move	Manufacturer	Points
1		(Finland) Marcus Grönholm	31		(Finland) Timo Rautiainen	31		(France) Peugeot Total	68
2		(France) Gilles Panizzi	20		(France) Hervé Panizzi	20	1	(Japan) 555 Subaru World Rally Team	27
3		(United Kingdom) Richard Burns	19		(United Kingdom) Robert Reid	19	1	(United Kingdom) Ford Motor Co. Ltd.	27
4		(Finland) Tommi Mäkinen	14		(Finland) Kaj Lindström	14		(Japan) Marlboro Mitsubishi Ralliart	6
5	2	(Finland) Harri Rovanperä	9	2	(Finland) Risto Pietiläinen	9		(South Korea) Hyundai Castrol World Rally Team	2

=== Production World Rally Championship ===
==== Classification ====
Position		No.	Driver	Co-driver	Entrant	Car	Time	Difference	Points
Event	Class	No.	Driver	Co-driver	Entrant	Car	Time	Difference	Points
1	1	74	(Malaysia) Karamjit Singh	(Malaysia) Allen Oh	(Malaysia) Petronas EON Racing Team	Proton Pert	4:52:17.9		10
2	2	51	(Uruguay) Gustavo Trelles	(Argentina) Jorge Del Buono	(Italy) Mauro Rally Tuning	Mitsubishi Lancer Evo VI	4:57:59.4	+5:41.5	6
3	3	58	(Italy) Luca Baldini	(Italy) Marco Muzzarelli	(Italy) Top Run SRL	Mitsubishi Lancer Evo VI	4:59:10.7	+6:52.8	4
4	4	66	(Bulgaria) Dimitar Iliev	(Bulgaria) Petar Sivov	(Italy) Mauro Rally Tuning	Mitsubishi Lancer Evo VII	5:00:06.0	+7:48.1	3
5	5	55	(Lithuania) Saulius Girdauskas	(Lithuania) Žilvinas Sakalauskas	(Lithuania) TDS Racing	Mitsubishi Lancer Evo VI	5:03:08.5	+10:50.6	2
6	6	69	(Norway) Bernt Kollevold	(Norway) Ola Fløene	(Norway) Kollevold Rally Team	Mitsubishi Lancer Evo VI	5:10:37.3	+18:19.4	1
7	7	59	(United Kingdom) Natalie Barratt	(United Kingdom) Roger Freeman	(United Kingdom) Natalie Barratt Rallysport	Mitsubishi Lancer Evo VI	5:23:21.8	+31:03.9	0
8	8	65	(Austria) Beppo Harrach	(Austria) Jutta Gebert	(Austria) Stohl Racing	Mitsubishi Lancer Evo VI	5:43:08.2	+50:50.3	0
Retired SS12		71	(Italy) Stefano Marrini	(Italy) Tiziana Sandroni	(Italy) Top Run SRL	Mitsubishi Lancer Evo VI	Accident damage		0
Retired SS9		70	(Italy) Giovanni Manfrinato	(Italy) Claudio Condotta	(Italy) Top Run SRL	Mitsubishi Lancer Evo VI	Accident damage		0
Retired SS9		76	(Czech Republic) Pavel Valoušek	(Italy) Pierangelo Scalvini	(Italy) Jolly Club	Mitsubishi Lancer Evo VII	Mechanical		0
Retired SS6		54	(Peru) Ramón Ferreyros	(Spain) Diego Vallejo	(Italy) Mauro Rally Tuning	Mitsubishi Lancer Evo VI	Accident		0
Retired SS5		75	(Finland) Kristian Sohlberg	(Finland) Jukka Aho	(Finland) Blue Rose Team	Mitsubishi Lancer Evo VI	Suspension		0
Retired SS5		77	(Italy) Alfredo De Dominicis	(Italy) Rudy Pollet	Ralliart Italy	Mitsubishi Lancer Evo VII	Radiator		0
Retired SS4		52	(Argentina) Marcos Ligato	(Argentina) Rubén García	(Italy) Top Run SRL	Mitsubishi Lancer Evo VII	Engine		0
Retired SS2		53	(Italy) Alessandro Fiorio	(Italy) Enrico Cantoni	(Italy) Ralliart Italia	Mitsubishi Lancer Evo VII	Radiator		0
Retired SS1		57	(Japan) Toshihiro Arai	(New Zealand) Tony Sircombe	(Japan) Spike Subaru Team	Subaru Impreza WRX	Mechanical		0
Retired SS1		73	(United Kingdom) Martin Rowe	(United Kingdom) Chris Wood	(United Kingdom) David Sutton Cars Ltd	Mitsubishi Lancer Evo VII	Accident		0

==== Special stages ====
Day	Stage	Stage name	Length	Winner	Car	Time	Class leaders
Leg 1 (19 Apr)	SS1	Platres — Kato Amiantos 1	11.60 km	(Malaysia) Karamjit Singh	Proton Pert	10:09.3	(Malaysia) Karamjit Singh
Leg 1 (19 Apr)	SS2	Lagoudera — Kapouras 1	15.00 km	(Argentina) Marcos Ligato	Mitsubishi Lancer Evo VII	15:26.4	(Malaysia) Karamjit Singh
Leg 1 (19 Apr)	SS3	Kapouras — Agios Theodoros 1	21.56 km	(Peru) Ramón Ferreyros	Mitsubishi Lancer Evo VI	21:31.8	(Malaysia) Karamjit Singh
Leg 1 (19 Apr)	SS4	Platres — Kato Amiantos 2	11.60 km	(Italy) Giovanni Manfrinato	Mitsubishi Lancer Evo VI	10:10.3	(Malaysia) Karamjit Singh
Leg 1 (19 Apr)	SS5	Lagoudera — Kapouras 2	15.00 km	(Italy) Giovanni Manfrinato	Mitsubishi Lancer Evo VI	15:23.6	(Malaysia) Karamjit Singh
Leg 1 (19 Apr)	SS6	Kapouras — Agios Theodoros 2	21.56 km	(Italy) Giovanni Manfrinato	Mitsubishi Lancer Evo VI	21:14.9	(Italy) Giovanni Manfrinato
Leg 2 (20 Apr)	SS7	Prastio — Pachna 1	10.92 km	(Italy) Giovanni Manfrinato	Mitsubishi Lancer Evo VI	7:12.4	(Italy) Giovanni Manfrinato
Leg 2 (20 Apr)	SS8	Platres — Saittas 1	11.25 km	(Malaysia) Karamjit Singh	Proton Pert	10:14.6	(Malaysia) Karamjit Singh
Leg 2 (20 Apr)	SS9	Kourdali — Spilia	30.62 km	(Malaysia) Karamjit Singh	Proton Pert	33:04.5	(Malaysia) Karamjit Singh
Leg 2 (20 Apr)	SS10	Prastio — Pachna 2	10.92 km	(Uruguay) Gustavo Trelles	Mitsubishi Lancer Evo VI	6:58.4	(Malaysia) Karamjit Singh
Leg 2 (20 Apr)	SS11	Platres — Saittas 2	11.25 km	(Malaysia) Karamjit Singh	Proton Pert	10:44.0	(Malaysia) Karamjit Singh
Leg 2 (20 Apr)	SS12	Foini — Koilinia 1	29.88 km	(Lithuania) Saulius Girdauskas	Mitsubishi Lancer Evo VI	34:49.3	(Malaysia) Karamjit Singh
Leg 2 (20 Apr)	SS13	Platres — Saittas 3	11.25 km	(Malaysia) Karamjit Singh	Proton Pert	10:58.0	(Malaysia) Karamjit Singh
Leg 2 (20 Apr)	SS14	Foini — Koilinia 2	29.88 km	Stage cancelled			(Malaysia) Karamjit Singh
Leg 3 (21 Apr)	SS15	Vavatsinia — Mandra Kambiou 1	19.00 km	(Uruguay) Gustavo Trelles	Mitsubishi Lancer Evo VI	18:20.3	(Malaysia) Karamjit Singh
Leg 3 (21 Apr)	SS16	Macheras — Agioi Vavatsinias 1	12.80 km	(Uruguay) Gustavo Trelles	Mitsubishi Lancer Evo VI	12:26.7	(Malaysia) Karamjit Singh
Leg 3 (21 Apr)	SS17	Lageia — Kalavasos 1	9.14 km	(Uruguay) Gustavo Trelles	Mitsubishi Lancer Evo VI	8:27.7	(Malaysia) Karamjit Singh
Leg 3 (21 Apr)	SS18	Vavatsinia — Mandra Kambiou 2	19.00 km	(Uruguay) Gustavo Trelles	Mitsubishi Lancer Evo VI	19:45.0	(Malaysia) Karamjit Singh
Leg 3 (21 Apr)	SS19	Macheras — Agioi Vavatsinias 2	12.80 km	(Austria) Beppo Harrach	Mitsubishi Lancer Evo VI	13:23.4	(Malaysia) Karamjit Singh
Leg 3 (21 Apr)	SS20	Lageia — Kalavasos 2	9.14 km	(Malaysia) Karamjit Singh	Proton Pert	8:31.0	(Malaysia) Karamjit Singh

==== Championship standings ====
Pos.	Drivers' championships		
Pos.	Move	Driver	Points
1		(Finland) Kristian Sohlberg	10
2		(Peru) Ramón Ferreyros	10
3	New entry	(Malaysia) Karamjit Singh	10
4		(Bulgaria) Dimitar Iliev	9
5	3	(Uruguay) Gustavo Trelles	9
