= 2002 Tour de Corse =

3rd round of the 2002 World Rally Championship

2002 Tour de Corse 46th Tour de Corse - Rallye de France
Round 3 of the 2002 World Rally Championship season
← Previous event	Next event →
- Host country: France
- Rally base: Ajaccio
- Dates run: March 8, 2002 – March 10, 2002
- Stages: 16 (357.70 km; 222.26 miles)
- Stage surface: Asphalt
- Overall distance: 937.83 km (582.74 miles)

Statistics
- Crews: 61 at start, 37 at finish

Overall results
- Overall winner: (France) Gilles Panizzi (France) Hervé Panizzi (France) Peugeot Total; Peugeot 206 WRC

The 2002 Tour de Corse (formally the 46th Tour de Corse - Rallye de France) was the third round of the 2002 World Rally Championship. The race was held over three days between 8 March and 10 March 2002, and was won by Peugeot's Gilles Panizzi, his 4th win in the World Rally Championship.

== Background ==
=== Entry list ===
No.	Driver	Co-Driver	Entrant	Car	Tyre
World Rally Championship manufacturer entries
1	(United Kingdom) Richard Burns	(United Kingdom) Robert Reid	(France) Peugeot Total	Peugeot 206 WRC	M
2	(Finland) Marcus Grönholm	(Finland) Timo Rautiainen	(France) Peugeot Total	Peugeot 206 WRC	M
3	(France) Gilles Panizzi	(France) Hervé Panizzi	(France) Peugeot Total	Peugeot 206 WRC	M
4	(Spain) Carlos Sainz	(Spain) Luis Moya	(United Kingdom) Ford Motor Co. Ltd.	Ford Focus RS WRC '02	P
5	(United Kingdom) Colin McRae	(United Kingdom) Nicky Grist	(United Kingdom) Ford Motor Co. Ltd.	Ford Focus RS WRC '02	P
6	(Estonia) Markko Märtin	(United Kingdom) Michael Park	(United Kingdom) Ford Motor Co. Ltd.	Ford Focus RS WRC '01	P
7	(France) François Delecour	(France) Daniel Grataloup	(Japan) Marlboro Mitsubishi Ralliart	Mitsubishi Lancer WRC	M
8	(United Kingdom) Alister McRae	(United Kingdom) David Senior	(Japan) Marlboro Mitsubishi Ralliart	Mitsubishi Lancer WRC	M
10	(Finland) Tommi Mäkinen	(Finland) Kaj Lindström	(Japan) 555 Subaru World Rally Team	Subaru Impreza S8 WRC '02	P
11	(Norway) Petter Solberg	(United Kingdom) Phil Mills	(Japan) 555 Subaru World Rally Team	Subaru Impreza S7 WRC '01	P
14	(Sweden) Kenneth Eriksson	(Sweden) Tina Thörner	(Czech Republic) Škoda Motorsport	Škoda Octavia WRC Evo2	M
15	(Finland) Toni Gardemeister	(Finland) Paavo Lukander	(Czech Republic) Škoda Motorsport	Škoda Octavia WRC Evo2	M
16	(Czech Republic) Roman Kresta	(Czech Republic) Jan Tománek	(Czech Republic) Škoda Motorsport	Škoda Octavia WRC Evo2	M
17	(Germany) Armin Schwarz	(Germany) Manfred Hiemer	(South Korea) Hyundai Castrol World Rally Team	Hyundai Accent WRC3	M
18	(Belgium) Freddy Loix	(Belgium) Sven Smeets	(South Korea) Hyundai Castrol World Rally Team	Hyundai Accent WRC3	M
19	(Poland) Tomasz Kuchar	(Poland) Maciej Szczepaniak	(South Korea) Hyundai Castrol World Rally Team	Hyundai Accent WRC3	M
World Rally Championship entries
23	(Belgium) François Duval	(Belgium) Jean-Marc Fortin	(Belgium) François Duval	Ford Focus RS WRC '01	P
24	(Finland) Harri Rovanperä	(Finland) Risto Pietiläinen	(France) Bozian Racing	Peugeot 206 WRC	M
25	(France) Philippe Bugalski	(France) Jean-Paul Chiaroni	(France) Piedrafita Sport	Citroën Xsara WRC	M
26	(Belgium) Bruno Thiry	(Belgium) Stéphane Prévot	Peugeot Team Belgium	Peugeot 206 WRC	—N/a
27	(Austria) Achim Mörtl	(Germany) Klaus Wicha	(Austria) Powerhorse World Rally Team	Peugeot 206 WRC	M
32	(Russia) Stanislav Gryazin	(Russia) Dmitriy Eremeev	(Russia) Stanislav Gryazin	Toyota Corolla WRC	—N/a
33	(France) Benoît Rousselot	(France) Gilles Mondésir	(France) Benoît Rousselot	Subaru Impreza S7 WRC '01	—N/a
101	(France) Jean-Claude Torre	(France) Patrick de la Foata	(France) Jean-Claude Torre	Subaru Impreza S5 WRC '99	—N/a
103	(Italy) Riccardo Errani	(Italy) Stefano Casadio	(Italy) Riccardo Errani	Škoda Octavia WRC	—N/a
PWRC entries
51	(Uruguay) Gustavo Trelles	(Argentina) Jorge Del Buono	(Italy) Mauro Rally Tuning	Mitsubishi Lancer Evo VII	—N/a
54	(Peru) Ramón Ferreyros	(Spain) Diego Vallejo	(Italy) Mauro Rally Tuning	Mitsubishi Lancer Evo VII	—N/a
55	(Oman) Hamed Al-Wahaibi	(United Kingdom) Michael Orr	Oman Arab World Rally Team	Mitsubishi Lancer Evo VII	—N/a
58	(Italy) Luca Baldini	(Italy) Marco Muzzarelli	(Italy) Top Run SRL	Mitsubishi Lancer Evo VI	—N/a
60	(United Kingdom) Ben Briant	(United Kingdom) Jayson Brown	(Malaysia) Petronas EON Racing Team	Proton Pert	—N/a
62	(Italy) Norberto Cangani	(Italy) Eros di Prima	(Italy) Top Run SRL	Mitsubishi Lancer Evo VI	—N/a
65	(Austria) Beppo Harrach	(Austria) Jutta Gebert	(Austria) Stohl Racing	Mitsubishi Lancer Evo VI	—N/a
66	(Bulgaria) Dimitar Iliev	(Bulgaria) Petar Sivov	(Italy) Mauro Rally Tuning	Mitsubishi Lancer Evo VII	—N/a
69	(Norway) Bernt Kollevold	(Norway) Ola Fløene	(Norway) Kollevold Rally Team	Mitsubishi Lancer Evo VI	—N/a
70	(Italy) Giovanni Manfrinato	(Italy) Claudio Condotta	(Italy) Top Run SRL	Mitsubishi Lancer Evo VI	—N/a
71	(Italy) Stefano Marrini	(Italy) Tiziana Sandroni	(Italy) Top Run SRL	Mitsubishi Lancer Evo VII	—N/a
72	(Sweden) Joakim Roman	(Sweden) Ingrid Mitakidou	(Sweden) Milbrooks World Rally Team	Mitsubishi Lancer Evo VI	—N/a
73	(United Kingdom) Martin Rowe	(United Kingdom) Chris Wood	(United Kingdom) David Sutton Cars Ltd	Mitsubishi Lancer Evo VI	—N/a
75	(Finland) Kristian Sohlberg	(Finland) Jukka Aho	(Finland) Blue Rose Team	Mitsubishi Lancer Evo VI	—N/a
77	(Italy) Alfredo De Dominicis	(Italy) Rudy Pollet	Ralliart Italy	Mitsubishi Lancer Evo VI	—N/a

=== Itinerary ===
All dates and times are CET (UTC+1).

Date	Time	No.	Stage name	Distance
Leg 1 — 95.47 km
8 March	08:15	SS1	Cuttoli — Peri 1	17.72 km
8 March	09:44	SS2	Ocana — Radicale 1	11.65 km
8 March	11:55	SS3	Petreto — Ampaza 1	36.73 km
8 March	14:04	SS4	Cuttoli — Peri 2	17.72 km
8 March	14:52	SS5	Ocana — Radicale 2	11.65 km
Leg 2 — 150.23 km
9 March	09:24	SS6	Petreto — Ampaza 2	36.73 km
9 March	11:40	SS7	Gare de Carbuccia — Gare d'Ucciani 1	10.66 km
9 March	12:05	SS8	Vero — Pont d'Azzana 1	18.28 km
9 March	12:47	SS9	Lopigna — Sarrola 1	27.81 km
9 March	15:01	SS10	Gare de Carbuccia — Gare d'Ucciani 2	10.66 km
9 March	15:26	SS11	Vero — Pont d'Azzana 2	18.28 km
9 March	16:05	SS12	Lopigna — Sarrola 2	27.81 km
Leg 3 — 112.00 km
10 March	09:29	SS13	Penitencier Coti Chiavari — Pietra Rossa 1	24.21 km
10 March	10:05	SS14	Pont de Calzola — Agosta Plage 1	31.79 km
10 March	12:07	SS15	Penitencier Coti Chiavari — Pietra Rossa 2	24.21 km
10 March	12:43	SS16	Pont de Calzola — Agosta Plage 2	31.79 km

== Results ==
=== Overall ===
Pos.	No.	Driver	Co-driver	Team	Car	Time	Difference	Points
1	3	(France) Gilles Panizzi	(France) Hervé Panizzi	(France) Peugeot Total	Peugeot 206 WRC	3:54:40.3		10
2	2	(Finland) Marcus Grönholm	(Finland) Timo Rautiainen	(France) Peugeot Total	Peugeot 206 WRC	3:55:20.8	+40.5	6
3	1	(United Kingdom) Richard Burns	(United Kingdom) Robert Reid	(France) Peugeot Total	Peugeot 206 WRC	3:55:32.7	+52.4	4
4	25	(France) Philippe Bugalski	(France) Jean-Paul Chiaroni	(France) Piedrafita Sport	Citroën Xsara WRC	3:56:42.5	+2:02.2	3
5	11	(Norway) Petter Solberg	(United Kingdom) Phil Mills	(Japan) 555 Subaru World Rally Team	Subaru Impreza S7 WRC '01	3:57:08.5	+2:28.2	2
6	4	(Spain) Carlos Sainz	(Spain) Luis Moya	(United Kingdom) Ford Motor Co. Ltd.	Ford Focus RS WRC '02	3:57:13.1	+2:32.8	1

=== World Rally Cars ===
==== Classification ====
Position		No.	Driver	Co-driver	Entrant	Car	Time	Difference	Points
Event	Class	No.	Driver	Co-driver	Entrant	Car	Time	Difference	Points
1	1	3	(France) Gilles Panizzi	(France) Hervé Panizzi	(France) Peugeot Total	Peugeot 206 WRC	3:54:40.3		10
2	2	2	(Finland) Marcus Grönholm	(Finland) Timo Rautiainen	(France) Peugeot Total	Peugeot 206 WRC	3:55:20.8	+40.5	6
3	3	1	(United Kingdom) Richard Burns	(United Kingdom) Robert Reid	(France) Peugeot Total	Peugeot 206 WRC	3:55:32.7	+52.4	4
5	4	11	(Norway) Petter Solberg	(United Kingdom) Phil Mills	(Japan) 555 Subaru World Rally Team	Subaru Impreza S7 WRC '01	3:57:08.5	+2:28.2	2
6	5	4	(Spain) Carlos Sainz	(Spain) Luis Moya	(United Kingdom) Ford Motor Co. Ltd.	Ford Focus RS WRC '02	3:57:13.1	+2:32.8	1
7	6	7	(France) François Delecour	(France) Daniel Grataloup	(Japan) Marlboro Mitsubishi Ralliart	Mitsubishi Lancer WRC	3:59:48.1	+5:07.8	0
8	7	6	(Estonia) Markko Märtin	(United Kingdom) Michael Park	(United Kingdom) Ford Motor Co. Ltd.	Ford Focus RS WRC '01	4:00:00.3	+5:20.0	0
9	8	18	(Belgium) Freddy Loix	(Belgium) Sven Smeets	(South Korea) Hyundai Castrol World Rally Team	Hyundai Accent WRC3	4:00:54.1	+6:13.8	0
10	9	8	(United Kingdom) Alister McRae	(United Kingdom) David Senior	(Japan) Marlboro Mitsubishi Ralliart	Mitsubishi Lancer WRC	4:01:12.8	+6:32.5	0
12	10	15	(Finland) Toni Gardemeister	(Finland) Paavo Lukander	(Czech Republic) Škoda Motorsport	Škoda Octavia WRC Evo2	4:02:06.0	+7:25.7	0
13	11	17	(Germany) Armin Schwarz	(Germany) Manfred Hiemer	(South Korea) Hyundai Castrol World Rally Team	Hyundai Accent WRC3	4:02:42.3	+8:02.0	0
14	12	16	(Czech Republic) Roman Kresta	(Czech Republic) Jan Tománek	(Czech Republic) Škoda Motorsport	Škoda Octavia WRC Evo2	4:10:22.9	+15:42.6	0
Retired SS15		5	(United Kingdom) Colin McRae	(United Kingdom) Nicky Grist	(United Kingdom) Ford Motor Co. Ltd.	Ford Focus RS WRC '02	Accident		0
Retired SS14		14	(Sweden) Kenneth Eriksson	(Sweden) Tina Thörner	(Czech Republic) Škoda Motorsport	Škoda Octavia WRC Evo2	Differential		0
Retired SS10		10	(Finland) Tommi Mäkinen	(Finland) Kaj Lindström	(Japan) 555 Subaru World Rally Team	Subaru Impreza S8 WRC '02	Accident		0
Retired SS2		19	(Poland) Tomasz Kuchar	(Poland) Maciej Szczepaniak	(South Korea) Hyundai Castrol World Rally Team	Hyundai Accent WRC3	Brakes		0

==== Special stages ====
Day	Stage	Stage name	Length	Winner	Car	Time	Class leaders
Leg 1 (8 Mar)	SS1	Cuttoli — Peri 1	17.72 km	(France) Gilles Panizzi	Peugeot 206 WRC	11:33.3	(France) Gilles Panizzi
Leg 1 (8 Mar)	SS2	Ocana — Radicale 1	11.65 km	(France) Gilles Panizzi	Peugeot 206 WRC	7:26.1	(France) Gilles Panizzi
Leg 1 (8 Mar)	SS3	Petreto — Ampaza 1	36.73 km	(France) Gilles Panizzi	Peugeot 206 WRC	23:45.0	(France) Gilles Panizzi
Leg 1 (8 Mar)	SS4	Cuttoli — Peri 2	17.72 km	(France) Gilles Panizzi	Peugeot 206 WRC	11:33.0	(France) Gilles Panizzi
Leg 1 (8 Mar)	SS5	Ocana — Radicale 2	11.65 km	(Finland) Marcus Grönholm	Peugeot 206 WRC	7:57.8	(France) Gilles Panizzi
Leg 2 (9 Mar)	SS6	Petreto — Ampaza 2	36.73 km	(Norway) Petter Solberg	Subaru Impreza S7 WRC '01	24:29.2	(France) Gilles Panizzi
Leg 2 (9 Mar)	SS7	Gare de Carbuccia — Gare d'Ucciani 1	10.66 km	(France) Gilles Panizzi	Peugeot 206 WRC	7:28.2	(France) Gilles Panizzi
Leg 2 (9 Mar)	SS8	Vero — Pont d'Azzana 1	18.28 km	(France) Gilles Panizzi	Peugeot 206 WRC	13:01.7	(France) Gilles Panizzi
Leg 2 (9 Mar)	SS9	Lopigna — Sarrola 1	27.81 km	(United Kingdom) Richard Burns	Peugeot 206 WRC	18:11.6	(France) Gilles Panizzi
Leg 2 (9 Mar)	SS10	Gare de Carbuccia — Gare d'Ucciani 2	10.66 km	(Norway) Petter Solberg	Subaru Impreza S7 WRC '01	7:55.4	(France) Gilles Panizzi
Leg 2 (9 Mar)	SS11	Vero — Pont d'Azzana 2	18.28 km	(France) Gilles Panizzi	Peugeot 206 WRC	13:11.0	(France) Gilles Panizzi
Leg 2 (9 Mar)	SS12	Lopigna — Sarrola 2	27.81 km	(France) Gilles Panizzi	Peugeot 206 WRC	18:17.6	(France) Gilles Panizzi
Leg 3 (10 Mar)	SS13	Penitencier Coti Chiavari — Pietra Rossa 1	24.21 km	(United Kingdom) Colin McRae	Ford Focus RS WRC '02	15:11.1	(France) Gilles Panizzi
Leg 3 (10 Mar)	SS14	Pont de Calzola — Agosta Plage 1	31.79 km	(United Kingdom) Richard Burns	Peugeot 206 WRC	19:23.9	(France) Gilles Panizzi
Leg 3 (10 Mar)	SS15	Penitencier Coti Chiavari — Pietra Rossa 2	24.21 km	(Finland) Marcus Grönholm (France) Gilles Panizzi	Peugeot 206 WRC; Peugeot 206 WRC	15:10.4	(France) Gilles Panizzi
Leg 3 (10 Mar)	SS16	Pont de Calzola — Agosta Plage 2	31.79 km	(France) Philippe Bugalski	Citroën Xsara WRC	19:09.4	(France) Gilles Panizzi

==== Championship standings ====
Pos.	Drivers' championships			Co-drivers' championships			Manufacturers' championships		
Pos.	Move	Driver	Points	Move	Co-driver	Points	Move	Manufacturer	Points
1		(Finland) Marcus Grönholm	18		(Finland) Timo Rautiainen	18		(France) Peugeot Total	36
2	New entry	(France) Gilles Panizzi	10	New entry	(France) Hervé Panizzi	10		(United Kingdom) Ford Motor Co. Ltd.	20
3	1	(Finland) Tommi Mäkinen	10	1	(Finland) Kaj Lindström	10		(Japan) 555 Subaru World Rally Team	16
4	1	(Spain) Carlos Sainz	9	1	(Spain) Luis Moya	9		(Japan) Marlboro Mitsubishi Ralliart	5
5	2	(United Kingdom) Richard Burns	7	2	(United Kingdom) Robert Reid	7		(South Korea) Hyundai Castrol World Rally Team	1

=== Production World Rally Championship ===
==== Classification ====
Position		No.	Driver	Co-driver	Entrant	Car	Time	Difference	Points
Event	Class	No.	Driver	Co-driver	Entrant	Car	Time	Difference	Points
17	1	54	(Peru) Ramón Ferreyros	(Spain) Diego Vallejo	(Italy) Mauro Rally Tuning	Mitsubishi Lancer Evo VII	4:17:24.9		10
19	2	66	(Bulgaria) Dimitar Iliev	(Bulgaria) Petar Sivov	(Italy) Mauro Rally Tuning	Mitsubishi Lancer Evo VII	4:20:36.8	+3:11.9	6
21	3	73	(United Kingdom) Martin Rowe	(United Kingdom) Chris Wood	(United Kingdom) David Sutton Cars Ltd	Mitsubishi Lancer Evo VI	4:24:48.3	+7:23.4	4
22	4	51	(Uruguay) Gustavo Trelles	(Argentina) Jorge Del Buono	(Italy) Mauro Rally Tuning	Mitsubishi Lancer Evo VII	4:26:35.6	+9:10.7	3
23	5	65	(Austria) Beppo Harrach	(Austria) Jutta Gebert	(Austria) Stohl Racing	Mitsubishi Lancer Evo VI	4:29:36.2	+12:11.3	2
24	6	71	(Italy) Stefano Marrini	(Italy) Tiziana Sandroni	(Italy) Top Run SRL	Mitsubishi Lancer Evo VII	4:31:40.5	+14:15.6	1
26	7	72	(Sweden) Joakim Roman	(Sweden) Ingrid Mitakidou	(Sweden) Milbrooks World Rally Team	Mitsubishi Lancer Evo VI	4:34:28.9	+17:04.0	0
28	8	69	(Norway) Bernt Kollevold	(Norway) Ola Fløene	(Norway) Kollevold Rally Team	Mitsubishi Lancer Evo VI	4:34:41.4	+17:16.5	0
29	9	58	(Italy) Luca Baldini	(Italy) Marco Muzzarelli	(Italy) Top Run SRL	Mitsubishi Lancer Evo VI	4:36:33.4	+19:08.5	0
Retired SS10		55	(Oman) Hamed Al-Wahaibi	(United Kingdom) Michael Orr	Oman Arab World Rally Team	Mitsubishi Lancer Evo VII	Accident on road section		0
Retired SS9		62	(Italy) Norberto Cangani	(Italy) Eros di Prima	(Italy) Top Run SRL	Mitsubishi Lancer Evo VI	Accident		0
Retired SS7		60	(United Kingdom) Ben Briant	(United Kingdom) Jayson Brown	(Malaysia) Petronas EON Racing Team	Proton Pert	Mechanical		0
Retired SS4		70	(Italy) Giovanni Manfrinato	(Italy) Claudio Condotta	(Italy) Top Run SRL	Mitsubishi Lancer Evo VI	Accident		0
Retired SS4		77	(Italy) Alfredo De Dominicis	(Italy) Rudy Pollet	Ralliart Italy	Mitsubishi Lancer Evo VI	Electrical		0
Retired SS3		75	(Finland) Kristian Sohlberg	(Finland) Jukka Aho	(Finland) Blue Rose Team	Mitsubishi Lancer Evo VI	Accident		0

==== Special stages ====
Day	Stage	Stage name	Length	Winner	Car	Time	Class leaders
Leg 1 (8 Mar)	SS1	Cuttoli — Peri 1	17.72 km	(Peru) Ramón Ferreyros	Mitsubishi Lancer Evo VII	12:42.8	(Peru) Ramón Ferreyros
Leg 1 (8 Mar)	SS2	Ocana — Radicale 1	11.65 km	(Oman) Hamed Al-Wahaibi	Mitsubishi Lancer Evo VII	8:11.8	(Peru) Ramón Ferreyros
Leg 1 (8 Mar)	SS3	Petreto — Ampaza 1	36.73 km	(Peru) Ramón Ferreyros	Mitsubishi Lancer Evo VII	25:46.9	(Peru) Ramón Ferreyros
Leg 1 (8 Mar)	SS4	Cuttoli — Peri 2	17.72 km	(Peru) Ramón Ferreyros	Mitsubishi Lancer Evo VII	12:46.0	(Peru) Ramón Ferreyros
Leg 1 (8 Mar)	SS5	Ocana — Radicale 2	11.65 km	(Oman) Hamed Al-Wahaibi	Mitsubishi Lancer Evo VII	8:22.6	(Peru) Ramón Ferreyros
Leg 2 (9 Mar)	SS6	Petreto — Ampaza 2	36.73 km	(Peru) Ramón Ferreyros	Mitsubishi Lancer Evo VII	26:39.4	(Peru) Ramón Ferreyros
Leg 2 (9 Mar)	SS7	Gare de Carbuccia — Gare d'Ucciani 1	10.66 km	(Oman) Hamed Al-Wahaibi	Mitsubishi Lancer Evo VII	8:06.0	(Peru) Ramón Ferreyros
Leg 2 (9 Mar)	SS8	Vero — Pont d'Azzana 1	18.28 km	(Peru) Ramón Ferreyros	Mitsubishi Lancer Evo VII	14:14.0	(Peru) Ramón Ferreyros
Leg 2 (9 Mar)	SS9	Lopigna — Sarrola 1	27.81 km	(Peru) Ramón Ferreyros	Mitsubishi Lancer Evo VII	20:05.4	(Peru) Ramón Ferreyros
Leg 2 (9 Mar)	SS10	Gare de Carbuccia — Gare d'Ucciani 2	10.66 km	(Bulgaria) Dimitar Iliev	Mitsubishi Lancer Evo VII	8:25.1	(Peru) Ramón Ferreyros
Leg 2 (9 Mar)	SS11	Vero — Pont d'Azzana 2	18.28 km	(Peru) Ramón Ferreyros	Mitsubishi Lancer Evo VII	14:43.5	(Peru) Ramón Ferreyros
Leg 2 (9 Mar)	SS12	Lopigna — Sarrola 2	27.81 km	(Peru) Ramón Ferreyros	Mitsubishi Lancer Evo VII	20:35.3	(Peru) Ramón Ferreyros
Leg 3 (10 Mar)	SS13	Penitencier Coti Chiavari — Pietra Rossa 1	24.21 km	(Uruguay) Gustavo Trelles	Mitsubishi Lancer Evo VII	16:56.9	(Peru) Ramón Ferreyros
Leg 3 (10 Mar)	SS14	Pont de Calzola — Agosta Plage 1	31.79 km	(Uruguay) Gustavo Trelles	Mitsubishi Lancer Evo VII	21:28.1	(Peru) Ramón Ferreyros
Leg 3 (10 Mar)	SS15	Penitencier Coti Chiavari — Pietra Rossa 2	24.21 km	Notional stage time			(Peru) Ramón Ferreyros
Leg 3 (10 Mar)	SS16	Pont de Calzola — Agosta Plage 2	31.79 km	(Uruguay) Gustavo Trelles	Mitsubishi Lancer Evo VII	21:15.6	(Peru) Ramón Ferreyros

==== Championship standings ====
Pos.	Drivers' championships		
Pos.	Move	Driver	Points
1		(Finland) Kristian Sohlberg	10
2	New entry	(Peru) Ramón Ferreyros	10
3	1	(Japan) Toshihiro Arai	6
4	New entry	(Bulgaria) Dimitar Iliev	6
5	1	(United Kingdom) Martin Rowe	5
