= 2002 Rally Argentina =

6th round of the 2002 World Rally Championship

2002 Rally Argentina 22nd Rally Argentina
Round 6 of the 2002 World Rally Championship season
← Previous event	Next event →
- Host country: Argentina
- Rally base: Villa Carlos Paz
- Dates run: May 17, 2002 – May 19, 2002
- Stages: 22 (381.45 km; 237.02 miles)
- Stage surface: Gravel
- Overall distance: 1,427.39 km (886.94 miles)

Statistics
- Crews: 68 at start, 29 at finish

Overall results
- Overall winner: (Spain) Carlos Sainz (Spain) Luis Moya (United Kingdom) Ford Motor Co. Ltd. Ford Focus RS WRC '02

The 2002 Rally Argentina (formally the 22nd Rally Argentina) was the sixth round of the 2002 World Rally Championship. The race was held over three days between 17 May and 19 May 2002, and was won by Ford's Carlos Sainz, his 24th win in the World Rally Championship, after the disqualification of Peugeot drivers Marcus Grönholm and Richard Burns for illegal help and underweight flywheel respectively.

== Background ==
=== Entry list ===
No.	Driver	Co-Driver	Entrant	Car	Tyre
World Rally Championship manufacturer entries
1	(United Kingdom) Richard Burns	(United Kingdom) Robert Reid	(France) Peugeot Total	Peugeot 206 WRC	MI
2	(Finland) Marcus Grönholm	(Finland) Timo Rautiainen	(France) Peugeot Total	Peugeot 206 WRC	MI
3	(Finland) Harri Rovanperä	(Finland) Risto Pietiläinen	(France) Peugeot Total	Peugeot 206 WRC	MI
4	(Spain) Carlos Sainz	(Spain) Luis Moya	(United Kingdom) Ford Motor Co. Ltd.	Ford Focus RS WRC '02	P
5	(United Kingdom) Colin McRae	(United Kingdom) Nicky Grist	(United Kingdom) Ford Motor Co. Ltd.	Ford Focus RS WRC '02	P
6	(Estonia) Markko Märtin	(United Kingdom) Michael Park	(United Kingdom) Ford Motor Co. Ltd.	Ford Focus RS WRC '02	P
7	(France) François Delecour	(France) Daniel Grataloup	(Japan) Marlboro Mitsubishi Ralliart	Mitsubishi Lancer WRC	MI
8	(United Kingdom) Alister McRae	(United Kingdom) David Senior	(Japan) Marlboro Mitsubishi Ralliart	Mitsubishi Lancer WRC	MI
10	(Finland) Tommi Mäkinen	(Finland) Kaj Lindström	(Japan) 555 Subaru World Rally Team	Subaru Impreza S7 WRC '01	P
11	(Norway) Petter Solberg	(United Kingdom) Phil Mills	(Japan) 555 Subaru World Rally Team	Subaru Impreza S7 WRC '01	P
14	(Sweden) Kenneth Eriksson	(Sweden) Tina Thörner	(Czech Republic) Škoda Motorsport	Škoda Octavia WRC Evo2	MI
15	(Finland) Toni Gardemeister	(Finland) Paavo Lukander	(Czech Republic) Škoda Motorsport	Škoda Octavia WRC Evo2	MI
16	(Argentina) Gabriel Pozzo	(Argentina) Daniel Stillo	(Czech Republic) Škoda Motorsport	Škoda Octavia WRC Evo2	MI
17	(Germany) Armin Schwarz	(Germany) Manfred Hiemer	(South Korea) Hyundai Castrol World Rally Team	Hyundai Accent WRC3	MI
18	(Belgium) Freddy Loix	(Belgium) Sven Smeets	(South Korea) Hyundai Castrol World Rally Team	Hyundai Accent WRC3	MI
19	(Finland) Juha Kankkunen	(Finland) Juha Repo	(South Korea) Hyundai Castrol World Rally Team	Hyundai Accent WRC3	MI
World Rally Championship entries
23	(France) Gilles Panizzi	(France) Hervé Panizzi	(France) Peugeot Total	Peugeot 206 WRC	MI
103	(Argentina) Martin Galluser	(Argentina) Juan Carlos Uberti	(Argentina) Martin Galluser	Mitsubishi Lancer Evo III	—N/a
103	(Argentina) Pablo Gaviña	(Argentina) Adriana Iriart Urruty	(Argentina) Pablo Gaviña	Mitsubishi Lancer Evo III	—N/a
PWRC entries
51	(Uruguay) Gustavo Trelles	(Argentina) Jorge Del Buono	(Italy) Mauro Rally Tuning	Mitsubishi Lancer Evo VII	—N/a
52	(Argentina) Marcos Ligato	(Argentina) Rubén García	(Italy) Top Run SRL	Mitsubishi Lancer Evo VII	P
54	(Peru) Ramón Ferreyros	(Spain) Diego Vallejo	(Italy) Mauro Rally Tuning	Mitsubishi Lancer Evo VII	P
57	(Japan) Toshihiro Arai	(New Zealand) Tony Sircombe	(Japan) Spike Subaru Team	Subaru Impreza WRX	—N/a
58	(Italy) Luca Baldini	(Italy) Marco Muzzarelli	(Italy) Top Run SRL	Mitsubishi Lancer Evo VI	—N/a
65	(Austria) Beppo Harrach	(Austria) Jutta Gebert	(Austria) Stohl Racing	Mitsubishi Lancer Evo VI	—N/a
70	(Italy) Giovanni Manfrinato	(Italy) Claudio Condotta	(Italy) Top Run SRL	Mitsubishi Lancer Evo VI	—N/a
71	(Italy) Stefano Marrini	(Italy) Tiziana Sandroni	(Italy) Top Run SRL	Mitsubishi Lancer Evo VII	—N/a
74	(Malaysia) Karamjit Singh	(Malaysia) Allen Oh	(Malaysia) Petronas EON Racing Team	Proton Pert	—N/a
76	(Czech Republic) Pavel Valoušek	(Italy) Pierangelo Scalvini	(Italy) Jolly Club	Mitsubishi Lancer Evo VII	—N/a

=== Itinerary ===
All dates and times are ART (UTC−3).

Date	Time	No.	Stage name	Distance
Leg 1 — 153.79 km
17 May	08:33	SS1	Capilla del Monte — San Marcos Sierra 1	23.02 km
17 May	09:04	SS2	San Marcos Sierra — Cuchi Corral 1	26.97 km
17 May	10:54	SS3	Cosquin — Villa Allende 1	19.19 km
17 May	12:07	SS4	Complejo Pro-Racing (Lane A) 1	3.44 km
17 May	12:09	SS5	Complejo Pro-Racing (Lane B) 1	3.44 km
17 May	13:52	SS6	Tanti — Cosquin 1	16.07 km
17 May	14:50	SS7	La Falda — Villa Giardino 1	9.37 km
17 May	15:53	SS8	La Cumbre — Agua de Oro 1	23.46 km
17 May	16:45	SS9	Ascochinga — La Cumbre 1	28.83 km
Leg 2 — 153.79 km
18 May	08:33	SS10	Capilla del Monte — San Marcos Sierra 2	23.02 km
18 May	09:04	SS11	San Marcos Sierra — Cuchi Corral 2	26.97 km
18 May	10:54	SS12	Cosquin — Villa Allende 2	19.19 km
18 May	12:07	SS13	Complejo Pro-Racing (Lane A) 2	3.44 km
18 May	12:09	SS14	Complejo Pro-Racing (Lane B) 2	3.44 km
18 May	13:52	SS15	Tanti — Cosquin 2	16.07 km
18 May	14:50	SS16	La Falda — Villa Giardino 2	9.37 km
18 May	15:53	SS17	La Cumbre — Agua de Oro 2	23.46 km
18 May	16:45	SS18	Ascochinga — La Cumbre 2	28.83 km
Leg 3 — 73.87 km
19 May	09:00	SS19	El Condor — Copina	16.77 km
19 May	10:13	SS20	Giulio Cesare — Mina Clavero	22.82 km
19 May	10:53	SS21	Cura Brochero — Cienaga de Allende	13.63 km
19 May	12:39	SS22	El Mirador — San Lorenzo	20.65 km

== Results ==
=== Overall ===
Pos.	No.	Driver	Co-driver	Team	Car	Time	Difference	Points
1	4	(Spain) Carlos Sainz	(Spain) Luis Moya	(United Kingdom) Ford Motor Co. Ltd.	Ford Focus RS WRC '02	4:08:09.1		10
2	11	(Norway) Petter Solberg	(United Kingdom) Phil Mills	(Japan) 555 Subaru World Rally Team	Subaru Impreza S7 WRC '01	4:08:13.1	+4.0	6
3	5	(United Kingdom) Colin McRae	(United Kingdom) Nicky Grist	(United Kingdom) Ford Motor Co. Ltd.	Ford Focus RS WRC '02	4:10:28.2	+2:19.1	4
4	6	(Estonia) Markko Märtin	(United Kingdom) Michael Park	(United Kingdom) Ford Motor Co. Ltd.	Ford Focus RS WRC '02	4:11:01.5	+2:52.4	3
5	15	(Finland) Toni Gardemeister	(Finland) Paavo Lukander	(Czech Republic) Škoda Motorsport	Škoda Octavia WRC Evo2	4:13:27.9	+5:18.8	2
6	14	(Sweden) Kenneth Eriksson	(Sweden) Tina Thörner	(Czech Republic) Škoda Motorsport	Škoda Octavia WRC Evo2	4:14:25.7	+6:16.6	1

=== World Rally Cars ===
==== Classification ====
Position		No.	Driver	Co-driver	Entrant	Car	Time	Difference	Points
Event	Class	No.	Driver	Co-driver	Entrant	Car	Time	Difference	Points
1	1	4	(Spain) Carlos Sainz	(Spain) Luis Moya	(United Kingdom) Ford Motor Co. Ltd.	Ford Focus RS WRC '02	4:08:09.1		10
2	2	11	(Norway) Petter Solberg	(United Kingdom) Phil Mills	(Japan) 555 Subaru World Rally Team	Subaru Impreza S7 WRC '01	4:08:13.1	+4.0	6
3	3	5	(United Kingdom) Colin McRae	(United Kingdom) Nicky Grist	(United Kingdom) Ford Motor Co. Ltd.	Ford Focus RS WRC '02	4:10:28.2	+2:19.1	4
4	4	6	(Estonia) Markko Märtin	(United Kingdom) Michael Park	(United Kingdom) Ford Motor Co. Ltd.	Ford Focus RS WRC '02	4:11:01.5	+2:52.4	3
5	5	15	(Finland) Toni Gardemeister	(Finland) Paavo Lukander	(Czech Republic) Škoda Motorsport	Škoda Octavia WRC Evo2	4:13:27.9	+5:18.8	2
6	6	14	(Sweden) Kenneth Eriksson	(Sweden) Tina Thörner	(Czech Republic) Škoda Motorsport	Škoda Octavia WRC Evo2	4:14:25.7	+6:16.6	1
7	7	19	(Finland) Juha Kankkunen	(Finland) Juha Repo	(South Korea) Hyundai Castrol World Rally Team	Hyundai Accent WRC3	4:16:12.4	+8:03.3	0
8	8	8	(United Kingdom) Alister McRae	(United Kingdom) David Senior	(Japan) Marlboro Mitsubishi Ralliart	Mitsubishi Lancer WRC	4:16:58.7	+8:49.6	0
9	9	16	(Argentina) Gabriel Pozzo	(Argentina) Daniel Stillo	(Czech Republic) Škoda Motorsport	Škoda Octavia WRC Evo2	4:22:08.0	+13:58.9	0
Retired SS22		1	(United Kingdom) Richard Burns	(United Kingdom) Robert Reid	(France) Peugeot Total	Peugeot 206 WRC	Excluded - flywheel weight		0
Retired SS22		2	(Finland) Marcus Grönholm	(Finland) Timo Rautiainen	(France) Peugeot Total	Peugeot 206 WRC	Excluded - illegal help		0
Retired SS21		10	(Finland) Tommi Mäkinen	(Finland) Kaj Lindström	(Japan) 555 Subaru World Rally Team	Subaru Impreza S7 WRC '01	Accident		0
Retired SS11		3	(Finland) Harri Rovanperä	(Finland) Risto Pietiläinen	(France) Peugeot Total	Peugeot 206 WRC	Engine		0
Retired SS11		18	(Belgium) Freddy Loix	(Belgium) Sven Smeets	(South Korea) Hyundai Castrol World Rally Team	Hyundai Accent WRC3	Electrical		0
Retired SS9		17	(Germany) Armin Schwarz	(Germany) Manfred Hiemer	(South Korea) Hyundai Castrol World Rally Team	Hyundai Accent WRC3	Fuel pump		0
Retired SS7		7	(France) François Delecour	(France) Daniel Grataloup	(Japan) Marlboro Mitsubishi Ralliart	Mitsubishi Lancer WRC	Accident damage		0

==== Special stages ====
Day	Stage	Stage name	Length	Winner	Car	Time	Class leaders
Leg 1 (17 May)	SS1	Capilla del Monte — San Marcos Sierra 1	23.02 km	Stage cancelled			
Leg 1 (17 May)	SS2	San Marcos Sierra — Cuchi Corral 1	26.97 km	(Finland) Marcus Grönholm	Peugeot 206 WRC	15:38.7	(Finland) Marcus Grönholm
Leg 1 (17 May)	SS3	Cosquin — Villa Allende 1	19.19 km	(Finland) Marcus Grönholm	Peugeot 206 WRC	13:20.9	(Finland) Marcus Grönholm
Leg 1 (17 May)	SS4	Complejo Pro-Racing (Lane A) 1	3.44 km	(Finland) Marcus Grönholm	Peugeot 206 WRC	2:10.5	(Finland) Marcus Grönholm
Leg 1 (17 May)	SS5	Complejo Pro-Racing (Lane B) 1	3.44 km	(Finland) Tommi Mäkinen	Subaru Impreza S7 WRC '01	2:10.2	(Finland) Marcus Grönholm
Leg 1 (17 May)	SS6	Tanti — Cosquin 1	16.07 km	(United Kingdom) Richard Burns	Peugeot 206 WRC	8:27.3	(Finland) Marcus Grönholm
Leg 1 (17 May)	SS7	La Falda — Villa Giardino 1	9.37 km	(Finland) Marcus Grönholm	Peugeot 206 WRC	6:36.7	(Finland) Marcus Grönholm
Leg 1 (17 May)	SS8	La Cumbre — Agua de Oro 1	23.46 km	(Finland) Marcus Grönholm	Peugeot 206 WRC	20:38.9	(Finland) Marcus Grönholm
Leg 1 (17 May)	SS9	Ascochinga — La Cumbre 1	28.83 km	(Belgium) Freddy Loix	Hyundai Accent WRC3	20:18.6	(Finland) Marcus Grönholm
Leg 2 (18 May)	SS10	Capilla del Monte — San Marcos Sierra 2	23.02 km	(United Kingdom) Richard Burns	Peugeot 206 WRC	17:10.0	(Finland) Marcus Grönholm
Leg 2 (18 May)	SS11	San Marcos Sierra — Cuchi Corral 2	26.97 km	(Finland) Tommi Mäkinen	Subaru Impreza S7 WRC '01	15:13.3	(Finland) Marcus Grönholm
Leg 2 (18 May)	SS12	Cosquin — Villa Allende 2	19.19 km	(Finland) Tommi Mäkinen	Subaru Impreza S7 WRC '01	13:16.7	(Finland) Marcus Grönholm
Leg 2 (18 May)	SS13	Complejo Pro-Racing (Lane A) 2	3.44 km	(United Kingdom) Richard Burns	Peugeot 206 WRC	2:12.7	(Finland) Marcus Grönholm
Leg 2 (18 May)	SS14	Complejo Pro-Racing (Lane B) 2	3.44 km	(United Kingdom) Colin McRae	Ford Focus RS WRC '02	2:12.2	(Finland) Marcus Grönholm
Leg 2 (18 May)	SS15	Tanti — Cosquin 2	16.07 km	(Finland) Tommi Mäkinen	Subaru Impreza S7 WRC '01	8:22.7	(Finland) Marcus Grönholm
Leg 2 (18 May)	SS16	La Falda — Villa Giardino 2	9.37 km	(United Kingdom) Colin McRae	Ford Focus RS WRC '02	6:35.9	(Finland) Marcus Grönholm
Leg 2 (18 May)	SS17	La Cumbre — Agua de Oro 2	23.46 km	(Finland) Tommi Mäkinen	Subaru Impreza S7 WRC '01	19:49.4	(Finland) Tommi Mäkinen
Leg 2 (18 May)	SS18	Ascochinga — La Cumbre 2	28.83 km	(United Kingdom) Richard Burns (Finland) Marcus Grönholm	Peugeot 206 WRC; Peugeot 206 WRC	18:39.2	(Finland) Tommi Mäkinen
Leg 3 (19 May)	SS19	El Condor — Copina	16.77 km	(Finland) Marcus Grönholm	Peugeot 206 WRC	13:52.6	(Finland) Marcus Grönholm
Leg 3 (19 May)	SS20	Giulio Cesare — Mina Clavero	22.82 km	(Finland) Marcus Grönholm	Peugeot 206 WRC	18:35.0	(Finland) Marcus Grönholm
Leg 3 (19 May)	SS21	Cura Brochero — Cienaga de Allende	13.63 km	(Finland) Marcus Grönholm	Peugeot 206 WRC	6:43.1	(Finland) Marcus Grönholm
Leg 3 (19 May)	SS22	El Mirador — San Lorenzo	20.65 km	(United Kingdom) Richard Burns	Peugeot 206 WRC	11:30.8	(Spain) Carlos Sainz

==== Championship standings ====
Pos.	Drivers' championships			Co-drivers' championships			Manufacturers' championships		
Pos.	Move	Driver	Points	Move	Co-driver	Points	Move	Manufacturer	Points
1		(Finland) Marcus Grönholm	31		(Finland) Timo Rautiainen	31		(France) Peugeot Total	68
2		(France) Gilles Panizzi	20		(France) Hervé Panizzi	20	1	(United Kingdom) Ford Motor Co. Ltd.	41
3	3	(Spain) Carlos Sainz	19	3	(Spain) Luis Moya	19	1	(Japan) 555 Subaru World Rally Team	33
4	1	(United Kingdom) Richard Burns	19	1	(United Kingdom) Robert Reid	19		(Japan) Marlboro Mitsubishi Ralliart	6
5	1	(Finland) Tommi Mäkinen	14	1	(Finland) Kaj Lindström	14	1	(Czech Republic) Škoda Motorsport	5

=== Production World Rally Championship ===
==== Classification ====
Position		No.	Driver	Co-driver	Entrant	Car	Time	Difference	Points
Event	Class	No.	Driver	Co-driver	Entrant	Car	Time	Difference	Points
10	1	54	(Peru) Ramón Ferreyros	(Spain) Diego Vallejo	(Italy) Mauro Rally Tuning	Mitsubishi Lancer Evo VII	4:32:27.6		10
11	2	57	(Japan) Toshihiro Arai	(New Zealand) Tony Sircombe	(Japan) Spike Subaru Team	Subaru Impreza WRX	4:32:57.7	+30.1	6
12	3	74	(Malaysia) Karamjit Singh	(Malaysia) Allen Oh	(Malaysia) Petronas EON Racing Team	Proton Pert	4:33:42.7	+1:15.1	4
14	4	51	(Uruguay) Gustavo Trelles	(Argentina) Jorge Del Buono	(Italy) Mauro Rally Tuning	Mitsubishi Lancer Evo VII	4:38:40.7	+6:13.1	3
15	5	52	(Argentina) Marcos Ligato	(Argentina) Rubén García	(Italy) Top Run SRL	Mitsubishi Lancer Evo VII	4:39:34.4	+7:06.8	2
19	6	71	(Italy) Stefano Marrini	(Italy) Tiziana Sandroni	(Italy) Top Run SRL	Mitsubishi Lancer Evo VII	5:04:35.5	+32:07.9	1
Retired SS18		76	(Czech Republic) Pavel Valoušek	(Italy) Pierangelo Scalvini	(Italy) Jolly Club	Mitsubishi Lancer Evo VII	Mechanical		0
Retired SS17		70	(Italy) Giovanni Manfrinato	(Italy) Claudio Condotta	(Italy) Top Run SRL	Mitsubishi Lancer Evo VI	Differential		0
Retired SS15		65	(Austria) Beppo Harrach	(Austria) Jutta Gebert	(Austria) Stohl Racing	Mitsubishi Lancer Evo VI	Lost wheel		0
Retired SS4		58	(Italy) Luca Baldini	(Italy) Marco Muzzarelli	(Italy) Top Run SRL	Mitsubishi Lancer Evo VI	Engine		0

==== Special stages ====
Day	Stage	Stage name	Length	Winner	Car	Time	Class leaders
Leg 1 (17 May)	SS1	Capilla del Monte — San Marcos Sierra 1	23.02 km	Stage cancelled			
Leg 1 (17 May)	SS2	San Marcos Sierra — Cuchi Corral 1	26.97 km	(Japan) Toshihiro Arai	Subaru Impreza WRX	17:12.2	(Japan) Toshihiro Arai
Leg 1 (17 May)	SS3	Cosquin — Villa Allende 1	19.19 km	(Argentina) Marcos Ligato	Mitsubishi Lancer Evo VII	14:36.7	(Japan) Toshihiro Arai
Leg 1 (17 May)	SS4	Complejo Pro-Racing (Lane A) 1	3.44 km	(Argentina) Marcos Ligato	Mitsubishi Lancer Evo VII	2:21.9	(Japan) Toshihiro Arai
Leg 1 (17 May)	SS5	Complejo Pro-Racing (Lane B) 1	3.44 km	(Argentina) Marcos Ligato	Mitsubishi Lancer Evo VII	2:20.2	(Japan) Toshihiro Arai
Leg 1 (17 May)	SS6	Tanti — Cosquin 1	16.07 km	(Argentina) Marcos Ligato	Mitsubishi Lancer Evo VII	9:14.8	(Argentina) Marcos Ligato
Leg 1 (17 May)	SS7	La Falda — Villa Giardino 1	9.37 km	(Argentina) Marcos Ligato	Mitsubishi Lancer Evo VII	7:18.1	(Argentina) Marcos Ligato
Leg 1 (17 May)	SS8	La Cumbre — Agua de Oro 1	23.46 km	(Argentina) Marcos Ligato	Mitsubishi Lancer Evo VII	24:33.4	(Argentina) Marcos Ligato
Leg 1 (17 May)	SS9	Ascochinga — La Cumbre 1	28.83 km	(Japan) Toshihiro Arai	Subaru Impreza WRX	21:14.9	(Argentina) Marcos Ligato
Leg 2 (18 May)	SS10	Capilla del Monte — San Marcos Sierra 2	23.02 km	(Japan) Toshihiro Arai	Subaru Impreza WRX	18:35.6	(Japan) Toshihiro Arai
Leg 2 (18 May)	SS11	San Marcos Sierra — Cuchi Corral 2	26.97 km	(Malaysia) Karamjit Singh	Proton Pert	17:05.7	(Japan) Toshihiro Arai
Leg 2 (18 May)	SS12	Cosquin — Villa Allende 2	19.19 km	(Peru) Ramón Ferreyros	Mitsubishi Lancer Evo VII	14:34.2	(Japan) Toshihiro Arai
Leg 2 (18 May)	SS13	Complejo Pro-Racing (Lane A) 2	3.44 km	(Japan) Toshihiro Arai	Subaru Impreza WRX	2:24.6	(Japan) Toshihiro Arai
Leg 2 (18 May)	SS14	Complejo Pro-Racing (Lane B) 2	3.44 km	(Japan) Toshihiro Arai	Subaru Impreza WRX	2:24.2	(Japan) Toshihiro Arai
Leg 2 (18 May)	SS15	Tanti — Cosquin 2	16.07 km	(Japan) Toshihiro Arai	Subaru Impreza WRX	9:19.0	(Japan) Toshihiro Arai
Leg 2 (18 May)	SS16	La Falda — Villa Giardino 2	9.37 km	(Argentina) Marcos Ligato	Mitsubishi Lancer Evo VII	7:19.5	(Peru) Ramón Ferreyros
Leg 2 (18 May)	SS17	La Cumbre — Agua de Oro 2	23.46 km	(Peru) Ramón Ferreyros	Mitsubishi Lancer Evo VII	21:45.6	(Peru) Ramón Ferreyros
Leg 2 (18 May)	SS18	Ascochinga — La Cumbre 2	28.83 km	(Japan) Toshihiro Arai	Subaru Impreza WRX	20:14.3	(Peru) Ramón Ferreyros
Leg 3 (19 May)	SS19	El Condor — Copina	16.77 km	(Argentina) Marcos Ligato	Mitsubishi Lancer Evo VII	15:05.4	(Peru) Ramón Ferreyros
Leg 3 (19 May)	SS20	Giulio Cesare — Mina Clavero	22.82 km	(Peru) Ramón Ferreyros	Mitsubishi Lancer Evo VII	20:17.1	(Peru) Ramón Ferreyros
Leg 3 (19 May)	SS21	Cura Brochero — Cienaga de Allende	13.63 km	(Argentina) Marcos Ligato	Mitsubishi Lancer Evo VII	7:28.3	(Peru) Ramón Ferreyros
Leg 3 (19 May)	SS22	El Mirador — San Lorenzo	20.65 km	(Argentina) Marcos Ligato	Mitsubishi Lancer Evo VII	12:28.8	(Peru) Ramón Ferreyros

==== Championship standings ====
Pos.	Drivers' championships		
Pos.	Move	Driver	Points
1	1	(Peru) Ramón Ferreyros	20
2	1	(Malaysia) Karamjit Singh	14
3	3	(Japan) Toshihiro Arai	12
4	1	(Uruguay) Gustavo Trelles	12
5	4	(Finland) Kristian Sohlberg	10
