= Roman Kresta =

Czech rally driver (born 1976)

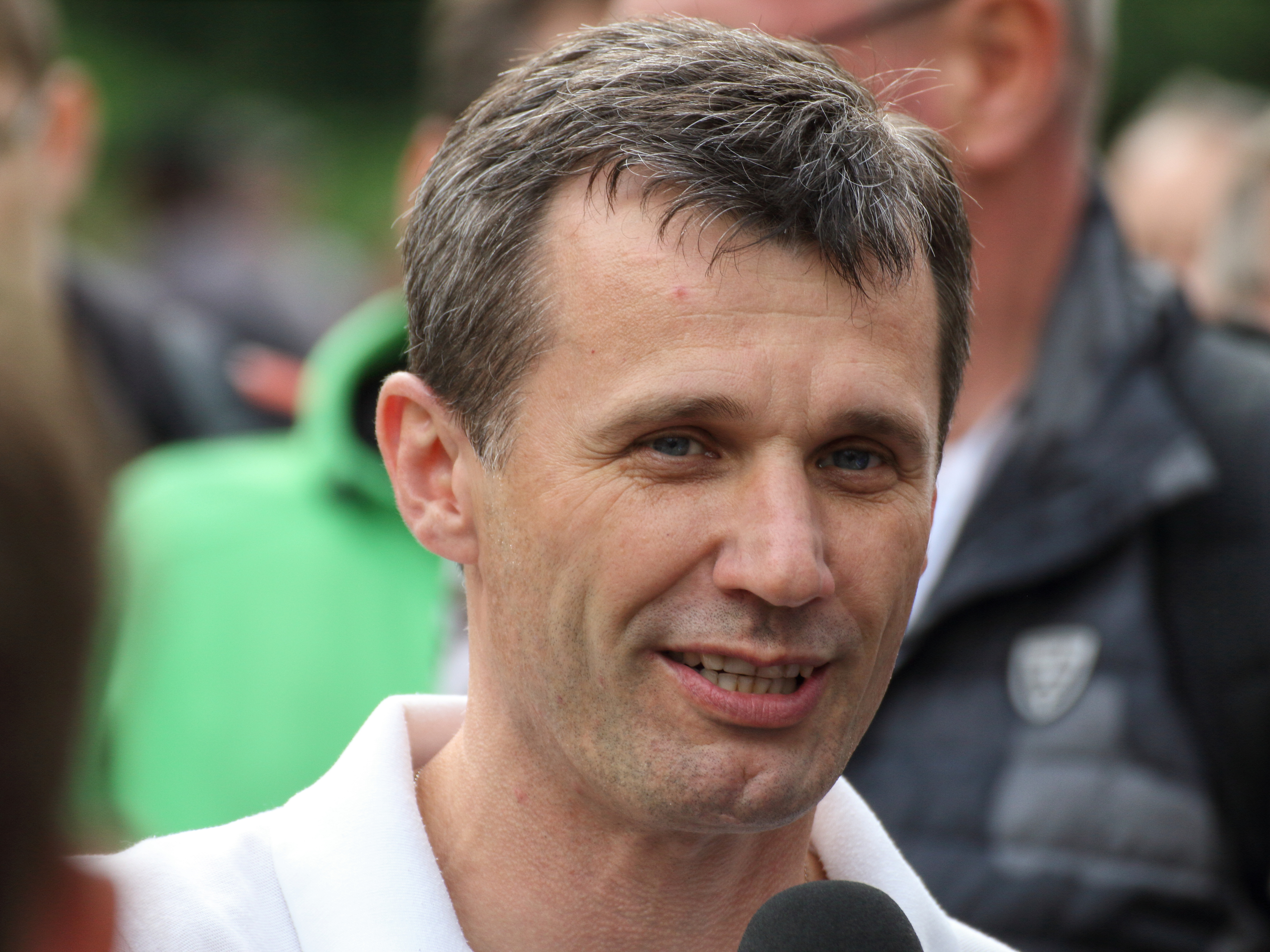
- Roman Kresta at Barum Rally Zlín in 2017

Personal information
- Nationality: (Czech Republic) Czech
- Born: 24 April 1976 (age 50); Gottwaldov, Czechoslovakia

World Rally Championship record
- Years active: 2001–2005, 2010
- Co-driver: (Czech Republic) Jan Tománek (Czech Republic) Miloš Hůlka (Czech Republic) Jan Možný (Czech Republic) Petr Gross
- Teams: Peugeot, Skoda, Ford
- Rallies: 37
- Championships: 0
- Rally wins: 0
- Podiums: 0
- Stage wins: 4
- Total points: 30
- First rally: 2001 Acropolis Rally
- Last rally: 2010 Rally Finland

Roman Kresta (born 24 April 1976 in the Czech Republic), is a Czech professional rally driver. In 2005, he drove for Ford in the World Rally Championship. His co-driver was Jan Tománek. The pair won the Czech national rally championship in 2000, prior to their début in the WRC.

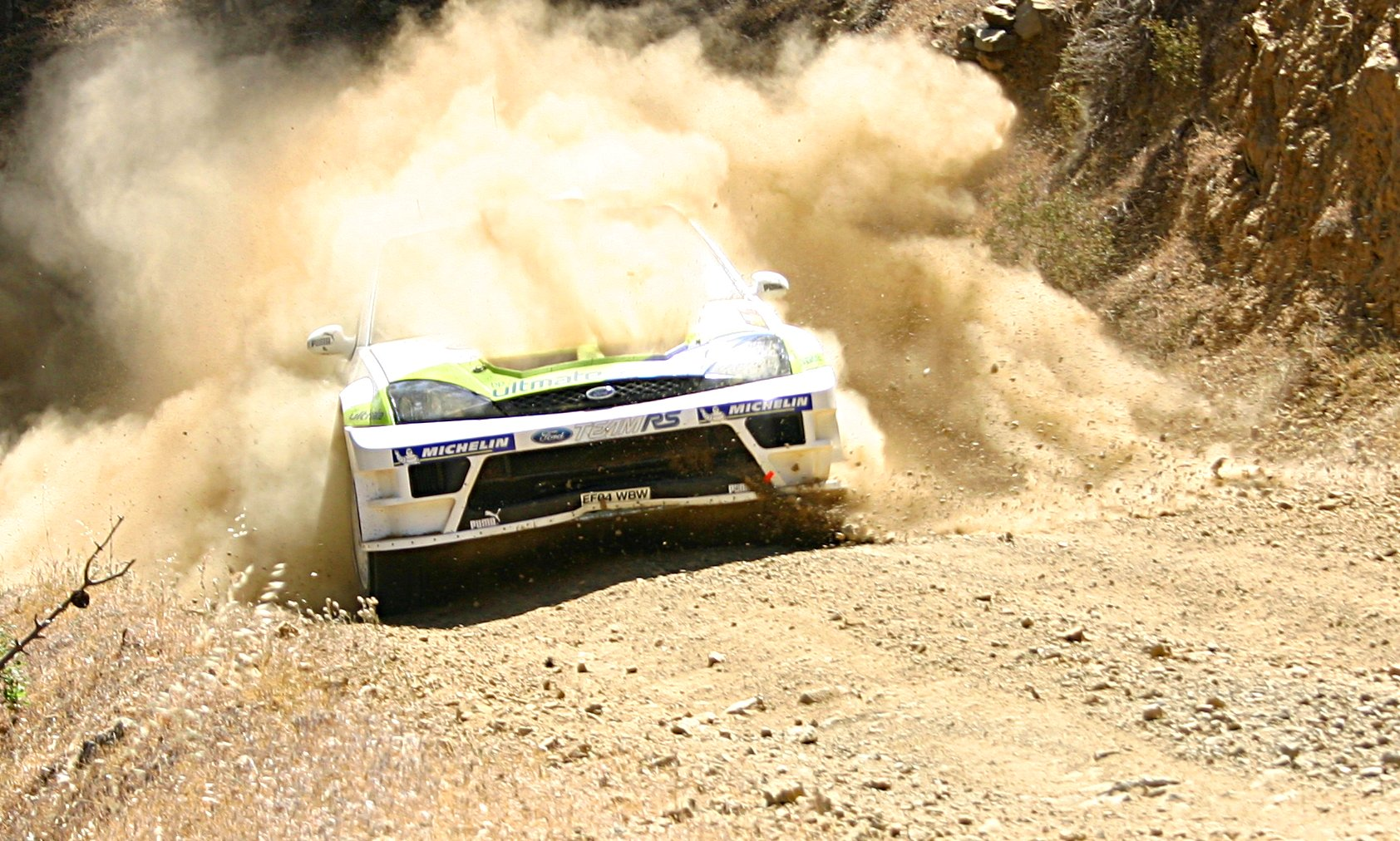
Kresta at the 2005 Cyprus Rally.

Kresta's first World Rally was the 2001 Acropolis Rally, driving a Ford Focus WRC. He has also driven for the works Skoda team, and as a privateer with Hyundai and Peugeot. His performances in his sole season with the works Ford World Rally Team in 2005 were not enough to prevent him from losing his seat to Mikko Hirvonen at the end of the season. However, he scored points in 11 of the 16 rallies held that season, achieving two fifth places in Corsica and Spain. He finished a career-best 8th overall in 2005 and scored 29 points, half the tally of teammate Toni Gardemeister's total of 58.

After the 2005 season, Kresta worked for Ford as a test driver.

Kresta returned to Czech national rally championship and became champion in 2008 and 2009. Since season 2009, Kresta was racing with Peugeot 207 S2000.

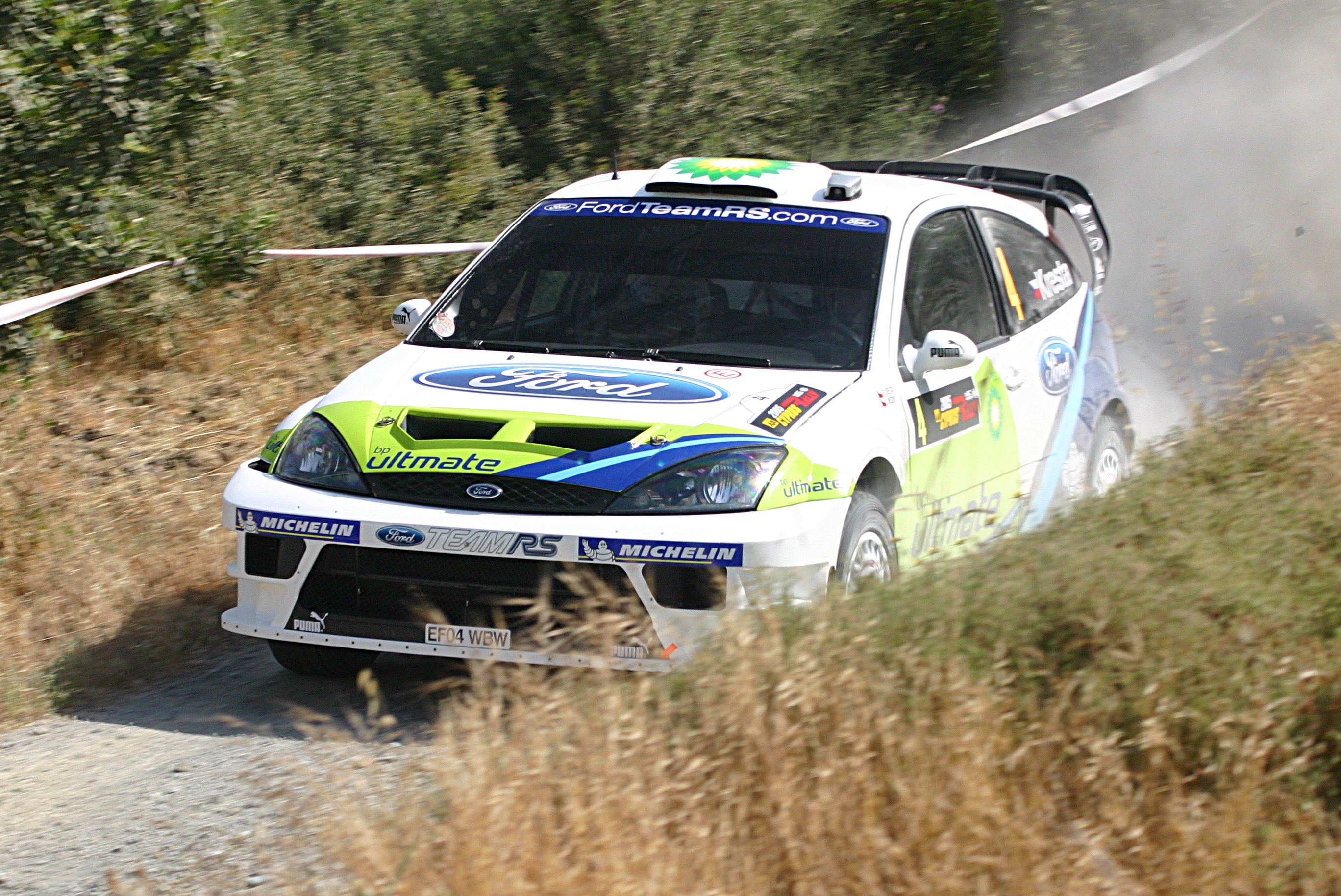
Kresta at the 2005 Cyprus Rally.

WRC 2010 saw Kresta's return to WRC. He participated with N4 Mitsubishi Lancer Evolution IX at Rally Sweden and Rally Finland. At Rally Sweden Kresta retired after 12 special stages because of problems with fuel tank. And Kresta finished 23rd at Rally Finland. He also raced in IRC 2010, round 9, Barum Rally Zlín 2010 with Škoda Fabia S2000. Kresta retired at SS5 because of crash, currently holding 5th position overall. He is going to race in last round of IRC 2010, 2010 Cyprus Rally. He finished 6th there, as best driver of not S2000 car. He also participated at Golden Stage Rally at Cyprus.

== Results ==
=== Complete WRC results ===
Year	Entrant	Car	1	2	3	4	5	6	7	8	9	10	11	12	13	14	15	16	Pos	Points
2001	Jolly Club	Ford Focus RS WRC 99	MON	SWE	POR	ESP	ARG	CYP	GRC; Ret										–	0
2001	Škoda Motorsport	Škoda Octavia WRC								KEN; Ret	FIN	NZL	ITA; Ret	FRA	AUS	GBR; Ret			–	0
2002	Škoda Motorsport	Škoda Octavia WRC	MON; Ret	SWE	FRA; 14	ESP	CYP; Ret	ARG	GRC	KEN; 7	FIN	GER	ITA; 12	NZL	AUS	GBR; 15			–	0
2003	Bozian Racing	Peugeot 206 WRC	MON; 10	SWE; 14	TUR	NZL	ARG	GRC; Ret	CYP	GER; Ret	FIN	AUS	ITA; 11	FRA	ESP; 13	GBR; 8			22nd	1
2004	Roman Kresta	Hyundai Accent WRC	MON; Ret	SWE	MEX	NZL	CYP												–	0
2004	Roman Kresta	Ford Focus RS WRC 02						GRC; Ret	TUR	ARG	FIN								–	0
2004	Škoda Motorsport	Škoda Fabia WRC										GER; Ret	JPN	GBR	ITA	FRA	ESP	AUS	–	0
2005	BP Ford World Rally Team	Ford Focus RS WRC 04	MON; 8	SWE; 8	MEX; Ret	NZL; DNS	ITA; 6	CYP; 6	TUR; 7	GRC; Ret	ARG; 11	FIN; 23	GER; 6	GBR; 6	JPN; 7	FRA; 5	ESP; 5	AUS; 6	8th	29
2010	Roman Kresta	Mitsubishi Lancer Evolution IX	SWE; Ret	MEX	JOR	TUR	NZL	POR	BUL	FIN; 23	GER	JPN	FRA	ESP	GBR				–	0

=== IRC results ===
Year	Entrant	Car	1	2	3	4	5	6	7	8	9	10	11	12	13	Pos	Points
2007	Tescoma Rally Team	Mitsubishi Lancer Evolution IX	KEN	TUR	BEL	RUS	POR	CZE; 4	ITA	SWI	CHI					17th	4
2008	Tescoma Rally Team	Peugeot 207 S2000	TUR	POR	BEL	RUS	POR	CZE; Ret	ESP	ITA	SWI	CHI				–	0
2009	Tescoma Rally Team	Peugeot 207 S2000	MON	BRA	KEN	POR	BEL	RUS	POR	CZE; 4	ESP	ITA	SCO			19th	5
2010	Mogul Racing Team	Škoda Fabia S2000	MON	BRA	ARG	CAN	ITA	BEL	AZO	MAD	CZE; Ret	ITA	SCO			29th	3
2010	Roman Kresta	Mitsubishi Lancer Evolution IX												CYP; 6		29th	3
2011	Adell Mogul Racing Team	Škoda Fabia S2000	MON	CAN	FRA	UKR	BEL	AZO	MAD	CZE; 8	HUN	ITA	SCO	CYP		32nd	4
2012	Adell Mogul Racing Team	Škoda Fabia S2000	AZO	CAN	IRL	COR	ITA	YPR	SMR	ROM	ZLI; 2	YAL	SLI	SAN	CYP	20th	8

=== Czech Rally Championship results ===
Year	Entrant	Car	1	2	3	4	5	6	7	8	9	10	11	12	13	MMČR	Points
1994	Roman Kresta	Škoda Favorit 136L	ŠUM	ÚSL	KRU	MAG	VYS	JEŠ	BOH	AGR	BAR	OTA	VAL	PŘÍ	HOR; 13	-	0
1995	Donner Team	Škoda Favorit 136L	ŠUM	MAG; Ret	ÚSL	KRU; Ret	VAL; 12	BOH	AGR	BAR; Ret	PŘÍ; Ret	HOR; 7				33rd	32
1996	AK Barum	Škoda Favorit 136L	ŠUM	SEV	ÚSL	KRU	VAL; Ret	BOH	VYŠ	AGR	BAR; 11	PŘÍ	HOR	3ST		39th	40
1997	Czech National Team	Škoda Felicia	ŠUM	SEV	ÚSL	KRU	VYŠ	BOH	BAR; 15	AGR	VAL	PŘÍ; 15	HOR	3ST		41st	42
1998	AK KTS Racing	Škoda Felicia	ŠUM; Ret	SEV; 9	ÚSL; 11	KRU; 15		BOH	BAR; 22	AGR	VAL; 14	HOR	PŘÍ	3ST		26th	110
1998	Czech National Team	Škoda Felicia					MAG; 13									26th	110
1999	Ládík Sport Team	Škoda Felicia Kit Car	ŠUM; 9	LIB; Ret	ÚSL; Ret	KRU; 8	VYŠ; Ret	BOH; 6	BAR; 9	AGR; 7	VAL; 6	HOR	PŘÍ			8th	272
2000	Škoda Motorsport	Škoda Octavia WRC	ŠUM; Ret	LIB; Ret	KRU; 1	BOH; 1	BAR; 1	PŘÍ; 3								1st	282
2001	Škoda Motorsport	Škoda Octavia WRC	ŠUM; 1	VAL; 1	KRU; Ret	BOH; 1	BAR; 1	PŘÍ	TŘE							1st	220
2002	Škoda Motorsport	Škoda Octavia WRC	ŠUM	VAL	KRU	BOH; 1	BAR; Ret	PŘÍ	TŘE							11th	120
2003	Team Síť Peugeot	Peugeot 206 WRC	ŠUM; 1	VAL; Ret	KRU; Ret	BOH; 1	BAR; Ret	PŘÍ	TŘE							7th	60
2004	Styllex Tuning Prosport	Subaru Impreza WRC 2003	JÄN	ŠUM; Ret	TAT; 1	KRU; 1										3rd	103
2004	Styllex Tuning Prosport	Ford Focus RS WRC 02					BOH; 2	BAR; 3	PŘÍ	TŘE						3rd	103
2006	Tescoma Rally Team	Mitsubishi Lancer Evo IX	JÄN	ŠUM	TAT	KRU	BOH	BAR; 1	TŘE	PŘÍ						-	(30)
2007	Mogul Rally Team	Mitsubishi Lancer Evo IX	JÄN	ŠUM; Ret	KRU; 1	BOH; 1	HOR									3rd	103
2007	Tescoma Rally Team	Mitsubishi Lancer Evo IX						BAR; 4	PŘÍ							3rd	103
2008	Mogul Racing Team	Mitsubishi Lancer Evo IX	JÄN	VAL; 1	ŠUM; 1	KRU; 1	HUS; 2	TŘE; 2	BOH; 1							1st	270
2008	Tescoma Rally Team	Peugeot 207 S2000								BAR; Ret	PŘÍ					1st	270
2009	Mogul Racing Team	Peugeot 207 S2000	VAL; 1	ŠUM; 2	KRU; 1	HUS; 1		PŘÍ; Ret	BOH; 9							1st	209
2009	Tescoma Rally Team	Peugeot 207 S2000					BAR; 3									1st	209
2010	Mogul Rally Team	Peugeot 207 S2000	VAL; Ret	ŠUM; 2	KRU; 1	HUS; 3	BOH; 2									4th	142
2010	Mogul Rally Team	Škoda Fabia S2000						BAR; Ret								4th	142
2010	Mogul Rally Team	Mitsubishi Lancer Evo IX							PŘÍ; Ret							4th	142
2011	Adell Mogul Racing Team	Škoda Fabia S2000	VAL; 2	ŠUM -	KRU; 1	HUS; 2	BOH; Ret	BAR; 2	PŘÍ; 1							1st	217
2012	Adell Mogul Racing Team	Škoda Fabia S2000	JÄN	VAL; 2	ŠUM; 2	KRU; 2	HUS; 2	BOH; Ret	BAR; 1	PŘÍ; Ret						2nd	194
2013	Adell Mogul Racing Team	Škoda Fabia S2000	JÄN	ŠUM	KRU; 2	HUS	BOH; 3	BAR; 4	PŘÍ							4th	143
2014	Adell Mogul Racing Team	Škoda Fabia S2000	JÄN	KRU	ŠUM	HUS	BOH	BAR; Ret	PŘÍ							-	0
2017	Mogul Racing Team	Škoda Fabia R5	VAL	ŠUM	KRU	HUS	BOH; 5	BAR; 2	PŘÍ							7th	99

== Gallery ==
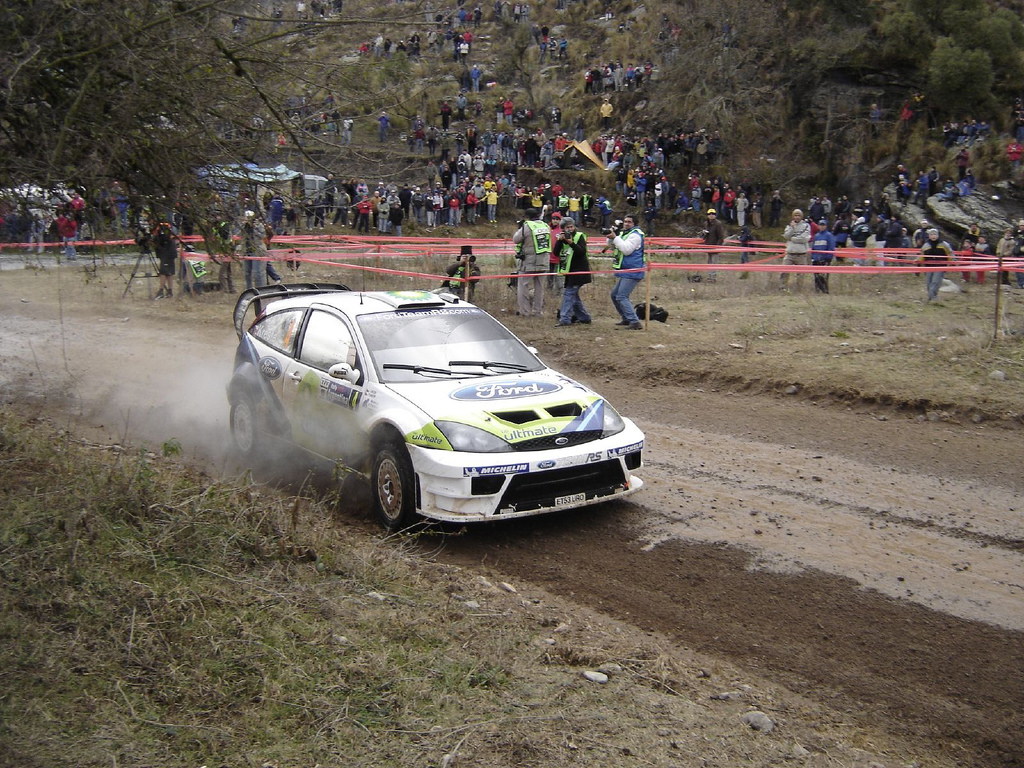

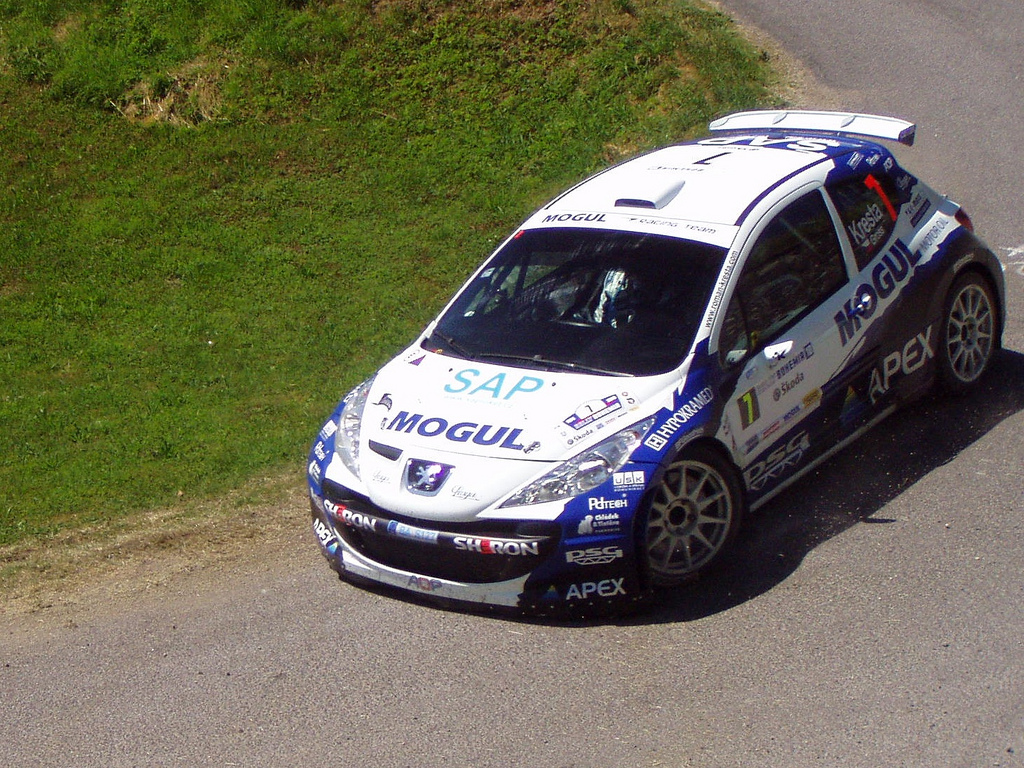

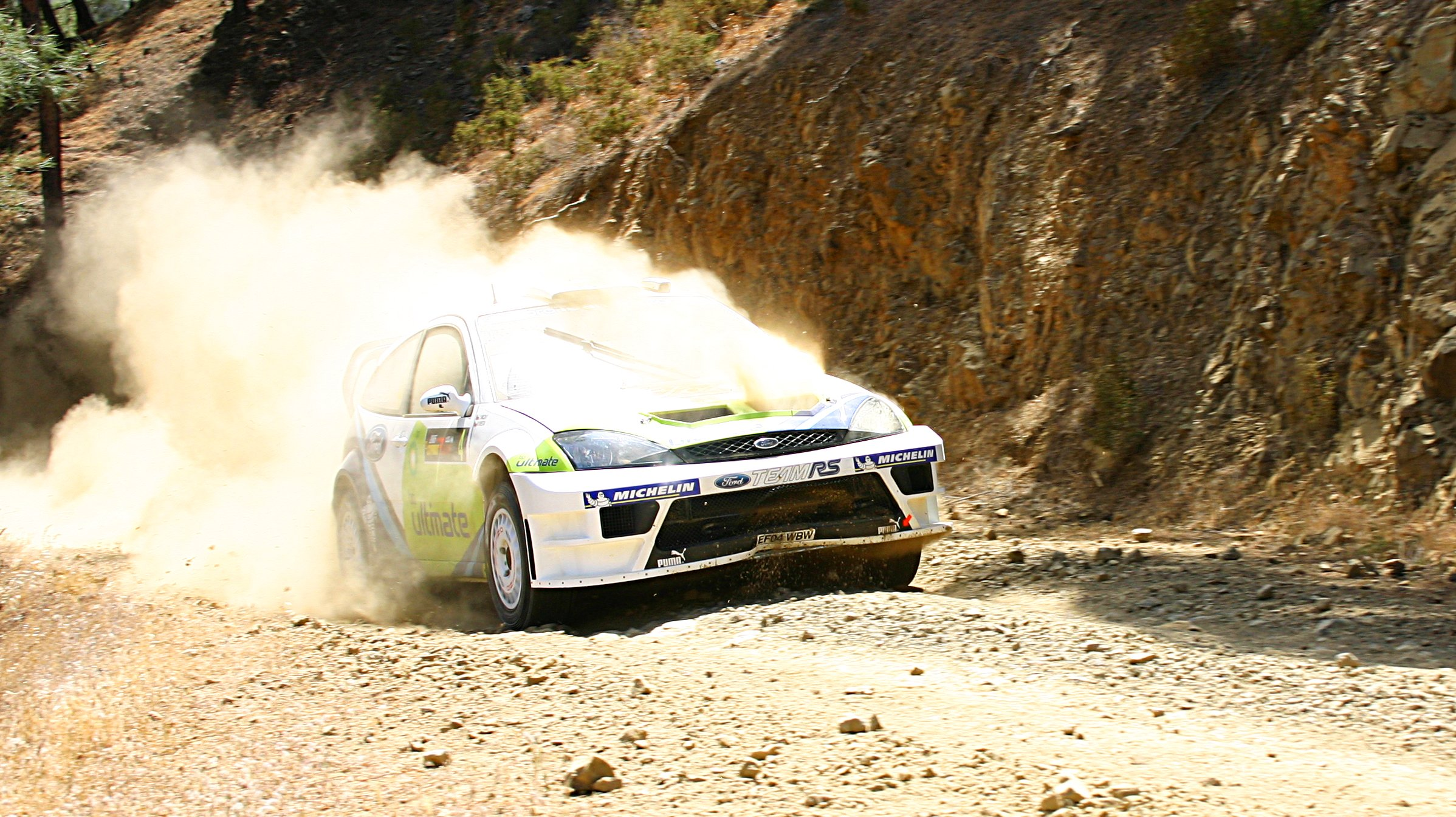
