= 2002 Rally Catalunya =

4th round of the 2002 World Rally Championship

2002 Rally Catalunya 38th Rallye Catalunya - Costa Brava
Round 4 of the 2002 World Rally Championship season
| ← Previous event | Next event → |
- Host country: Spain
- Rally base: Lloret de Mar
- Dates run: March 22, 2002 – March 24, 2002
- Stages: 18 (394.98 km; 245.43 miles)
- Stage surface: Asphalt
- Overall distance: 1,902.09 km (1,181.90 miles)

Statistics
- Crews: 68 at start, 40 at finish

Overall results
- Overall winner: (France) Gilles Panizzi (France) Hervé Panizzi (France) Peugeot Total; Peugeot 206 WRC

The 2002 Rally Catalunya (formally the 38th Rallye Catalunya - Costa Brava) was the fourth round of the 2002 World Rally Championship. The race was held over three days between 22 March and 24 March 2002, and was won by Peugeot's Gilles Panizzi, his 5th win in the World Rally Championship.

== Background ==
=== Entry list ===
| No. | Driver | Co-Driver | Entrant | Car | Tyre |
|---|---|---|---|---|---|
World Rally Championship manufacturer entries
| 1 | (United Kingdom) Richard Burns | (United Kingdom) Robert Reid | (France) Peugeot Total | Peugeot 206 WRC | MI |
| 2 | (Finland) Marcus Grönholm | (Finland) Timo Rautiainen | (France) Peugeot Total | Peugeot 206 WRC | MI |
| 3 | (France) Gilles Panizzi | (France) Hervé Panizzi | (France) Peugeot Total | Peugeot 206 WRC | MI |
| 4 | (Spain) Carlos Sainz | (Spain) Marc Martí | (United Kingdom) Ford Motor Co. Ltd. | Ford Focus RS WRC '02 | P |
| 5 | (United Kingdom) Colin McRae | (United Kingdom) Nicky Grist | (United Kingdom) Ford Motor Co. Ltd. | Ford Focus RS WRC '02 | P |
| 6 | (Estonia) Markko Märtin | (United Kingdom) Michael Park | (United Kingdom) Ford Motor Co. Ltd. | Ford Focus RS WRC '01 | P |
| 7 | (France) François Delecour | (France) Daniel Grataloup | (Japan) Marlboro Mitsubishi Ralliart | Mitsubishi Lancer WRC | MI |
| 8 | (United Kingdom) Alister McRae | (United Kingdom) David Senior | (Japan) Marlboro Mitsubishi Ralliart | Mitsubishi Lancer WRC | MI |
| 10 | (Finland) Tommi Mäkinen | (Finland) Kaj Lindström | (Japan) 555 Subaru World Rally Team | Subaru Impreza S7 WRC '01 | P |
| 11 | (Norway) Petter Solberg | (United Kingdom) Phil Mills | (Japan) 555 Subaru World Rally Team | Subaru Impreza S7 WRC '01 | P |
| 14 | (Sweden) Kenneth Eriksson | (Sweden) Tina Thörner | (Czech Republic) Škoda Motorsport | Škoda Octavia WRC Evo2 | MI |
| 15 | (Finland) Toni Gardemeister | (Finland) Paavo Lukander | (Czech Republic) Škoda Motorsport | Škoda Octavia WRC Evo2 | MI |
| 16 | (Sweden) Stig Blomqvist | (Venezuela) Ana Goñi | (Czech Republic) Škoda Motorsport | Škoda Octavia WRC Evo2 | MI |
| 17 | (Germany) Armin Schwarz | (Germany) Manfred Hiemer | (South Korea) Hyundai Castrol World Rally Team | Hyundai Accent WRC3 | MI |
| 18 | (Belgium) Freddy Loix | (Belgium) Sven Smeets | (South Korea) Hyundai Castrol World Rally Team | Hyundai Accent WRC3 | MI |
World Rally Championship entries
| 20 | (Sweden) Thomas Rådström | (France) Denis Giraudet | (France) Automobiles Citroën | Citroën Xsara WRC | MI |
| 21 | (France) Sébastien Loeb | (Monaco) Daniel Elena | (France) Automobiles Citroën | Citroën Xsara WRC | MI |
| 22 | (France) Philippe Bugalski | (France) Jean-Paul Chiaroni | (France) Automobiles Citroën | Citroën Xsara WRC | MI |
| 23 | (Finland) Harri Rovanperä | (Finland) Risto Pietiläinen | (France) Bozian Racing | Peugeot 206 WRC | MI |
| 24 | (Belgium) Bruno Thiry | (Belgium) Stéphane Prévot | (Belgium) Peugeot Bastos Racing | Peugeot 206 WRC | MI |
| 25 | (Spain) Jesús Puras | (Spain) Carlos del Barrio | (France) Citroen Sport | Citroën Xsara WRC | MI |
| 26 | (Austria) Achim Mörtl | (Germany) Klaus Wicha | (Austria) Powerhorse World Rally Team | Peugeot 206 WRC | MI |
| 32 | (Argentina) Gabriel Pozzo | (Argentina) Daniel Stillo | (Czech Republic) Škoda Motorsport | Škoda Octavia WRC | MI |
| 33 | (Russia) Stanislav Gryazin | (Russia) Dmitriy Eremeev | (Russia) Stanislav Gryazin | Toyota Corolla WRC | —N/a |
| 34 | (Germany) Armin Kremer | (Germany) Dieter Schneppenheim | (Germany) Armin Kremer | Ford Focus RS WRC '01 | P |
| 101 | (Spain) Joan Font | (Spain) Manel Muñoz | (Spain) Escudería Voltregá | Mitsubishi Lancer Evo VI | —N/a |
| 102 | (Netherlands) Peter Bijvelds | (Netherlands) Piet Bijvelds | (Netherlands) Peter Bijvelds | Mitsubishi Lancer Evo 6.5 | —N/a |
| 103 | (Spain) Joaquim Camps | (Spain) Sergi Villalvilla | (Spain) Montbui Racing Valles | Mitsubishi Carisma GT | —N/a |
| 104 | (Italy) Angelo Proietti | (Italy) Piero Di Francesco | (Italy) Angelo Proietti | Mitsubishi Lancer Evo VI | —N/a |
| 106 | (United Kingdom) David Price | (United Kingdom) Craig Parry | (United Kingdom) David Price | Mitsubishi Lancer Evo | —N/a |
| 107 | (United Kingdom) Natalie Barratt | (United Kingdom) Roger Freeman | (United Kingdom) Natalie Barratt Rallysport | Hyundai Accent WRC | —N/a |
JWRC entries
| 51 | (Italy) Andrea Dallavilla | (Italy) Giovanni Bernacchini | (Italy) Vieffe Corse SRL | Citroën Saxo S1600 | MI |
| 52 | (United Kingdom) Niall McShea | (United Kingdom) Michael Orr | (Germany) Opel Motorsport | Opel Corsa S1600 | MI |
| 53 | (Italy) Giandomenico Basso | (Italy) Luigi Pirollo | (Italy) Top Run SRL | Fiat Punto S1600 | MI |
| 54 | (Norway) Martin Stenshorne | (Finland) Jakke Honkanen | (Finland) ST Motors | Peugeot 206 S1600 | MI |
| 55 | (Belgium) François Duval | (Belgium) Jean-Marc Fortin | (United Kingdom) Ford Motor Co. Ltd. | Ford Puma S1600 | MI |
| 56 | (Finland) Jussi Välimäki | (Finland) Tero Gardemeister | (France) Citroën Sport | Citroën Saxo S1600 | MI |
| 57 | (Paraguay) Alejandro Galanti | (Spain) Xavier Amigó | (Italy) Astra Racing | Ford Puma S1600 | MI |
| 58 | (Italy) Christian Chemin | (Italy) Simone Scattolin | (Italy) Hawk Racing Club | Fiat Punto S1600 | MI |
| 59 | (Finland) Juha Kangas | (Finland) Jani Laaksonen | (Japan) Suzuki Sport | Suzuki Ignis S1600 | MI |
| 60 | (Italy) Nicola Caldani | (Italy) Sauro Farnocchia | (Italy) Procar Rally Team | Peugeot 206 S1600 | MI |
| 61 | (United Kingdom) Gwyndaf Evans | (United Kingdom) Chris Patterson | (United Kingdom) MG Sport & Racing | MG ZR S1600 | MI |
| 62 | (Finland) Janne Tuohino | (Finland) Petri Vihavainen | (France) Citroën Sport | Citroën Saxo S1600 | MI |
| 63 | (United Kingdom) Martin Rowe | (United Kingdom) Chris Wood | (Italy) Astra Racing | Ford Puma S1600 | MI |
| 64 | (Italy) Gianluigi Galli | (Italy) Guido D'Amore | (Italy) Top Run SRL | Fiat Punto S1600 | MI |
| 65 | (Spain) Daniel Solà | (Spain) Álex Romaní | (France) Citroën Sport | Citroën Saxo S1600 | MI |
| 66 | (San Marino) Mirco Baldacci | (Italy) Maurizio Barone | (Italy) Vieffe Corse SRL | Citroën Saxo S1600 | MI |
| 67 | (Sweden) Daniel Carlsson | (Sweden) Mattias Andersson | (Italy) Astra Racing | Ford Puma S1600 | MI |
| 68 | (Germany) Nikolaus Schelle | (Germany) Gerhard Weiss | (Japan) Suzuki Sport | Suzuki Ignis S1600 | MI |
| 69 | (Finland) Kosti Katajamäki | (Finland) Lasse Hirvijärvi | (Germany) Volkswagen Racing | Volkswagen Polo S1600 | MI |
| 70 | (Germany) Sven Haaf | (Germany) Michael Kölbach | (France) Citroën Sport | Citroën Saxo S1600 | MI |
| 71 | (Austria) David Doppelreiter | (Austria) Thomas Lettner | (Austria) Schmidt Racing | Peugeot 206 S1600 | MI |
| 73 | (Andorra) Albert Lloverá | (Spain) Marc Corral | (Spain) Pronto Racing | Fiat Punto S1600 | MI |
| 75 | (Japan) Kazuhiko Niwa | (Japan) Kohei Kusaka | (Japan) Suzuki Sport | Suzuki Ignis S1600 | MI |
| 76 | (Norway) Alexander Foss | (Norway) Cato Menkerud | (United Kingdom) Ford Motor Co. Ltd. | Ford Puma S1600 | MI |
| 77 | (Spain) Paco Roig | (Spain) Joan Sureda | (Spain) Fiat Auto España | Fiat Punto S1600 | MI |
| 78 | (Lebanon) Roger Feghali | (Italy) Nicola Arena | (Italy) Astra Racing | Ford Puma S1600 | MI |

=== Itinerary ===
All dates and times are CET (UTC+1).

| Date | Time | No. | Stage name | Distance |
|---|---|---|---|---|
Leg 1 — 176.72 km
| 22 March | 08:25 | SS1 | Riudecanyes 1 | 12.66 km |
| 22 March | 09:05 | SS2 | Pratdip 1 | 27.65 km |
| 22 March | 11:33 | SS3 | Escaladei 1 | 48.05 km |
| 22 March | 14:18 | SS4 | Riudecanyes 2 | 12.66 km |
| 22 March | 14:58 | SS5 | Pratdip 2 | 27.65 km |
| 22 March | 17:26 | SS6 | Escaladei 2 | 48.05 km |
Leg 2 — 112.00 km
| 23 March | 10:10 | SS7 | Coll de Bracons 1 | 19.66 km |
| 23 March | 11:23 | SS8 | Vallfogona 1 | 14.54 km |
| 23 March | 12:16 | SS9 | Les Llosses — Alpens 1 | 21.80 km |
| 23 March | 14:34 | SS10 | Coll de Bracons 2 | 19.66 km |
| 23 March | 15:47 | SS11 | Vallfogona 2 | 14.54 km |
| 23 March | 16:40 | SS12 | Les Llosses — Alpens 2 | 21.80 km |
Leg 3 — 106.26 km
| 24 March | 08:25 | SS13 | La Trona 1 | 12.90 km |
| 24 March | 09:35 | SS14 | La Roca 1 | 5.05 km |
| 24 March | 10:03 | SS15 | Viladrau 1 | 35.18 km |
| 24 March | 12:01 | SS16 | La Trona 2 | 12.90 km |
| 24 March | 13:11 | SS17 | La Roca 2 | 5.05 km |
| 24 March | 13:39 | SS18 | Viladrau 2 | 35.18 km |

== Results ==
=== Overall ===
| Pos. | No. | Driver | Co-driver | Team | Car | Time | Difference | Points |
|---|---|---|---|---|---|---|---|---|
| 1 | 3 | (France) Gilles Panizzi | (France) Hervé Panizzi | (France) Peugeot Total | Peugeot 206 WRC | 3:34:09.0 | | 10 |
| 2 | 1 | (United Kingdom) Richard Burns | (United Kingdom) Robert Reid | (France) Peugeot Total | Peugeot 206 WRC | 3:34:46.3 | +37.3 | 6 |
| 3 | 22 | (France) Philippe Bugalski | (France) Jean-Paul Chiaroni | (France) Automobiles Citroën | Citroën Xsara WRC | 3:35:22.5 | +1:13.5 | 4 |
| 4 | 2 | (Finland) Marcus Grönholm | (Finland) Timo Rautiainen | (France) Peugeot Total | Peugeot 206 WRC | 3:35:51.7 | +1:42.7 | 3 |
| 5 | 11 | (Norway) Petter Solberg | (United Kingdom) Phil Mills | (Japan) 555 Subaru World Rally Team | Subaru Impreza S7 WRC '01 | 3:36:10.6 | +2:01.6 | 2 |
| 6 | 5 | (United Kingdom) Colin McRae | (United Kingdom) Nicky Grist | (United Kingdom) Ford Motor Co. Ltd. | Ford Focus RS WRC '02 | 3:37:36.3 | +3:27.3 | 1 |

=== World Rally Cars ===
==== Classification ====
| Position | | No. | Driver | Co-driver | Entrant | Car | Time | Difference | Points |
| Event | Class | No. | Driver | Co-driver | Entrant | Car | Time | Difference | Points |
|---|---|---|---|---|---|---|---|---|---|
| 1 | 1 | 3 | (France) Gilles Panizzi | (France) Hervé Panizzi | (France) Peugeot Total | Peugeot 206 WRC | 3:34:09.0 | | 10 |
| 2 | 2 | 1 | (United Kingdom) Richard Burns | (United Kingdom) Robert Reid | (France) Peugeot Total | Peugeot 206 WRC | 3:34:46.3 | +37.3 | 6 |
| 4 | 3 | 2 | (Finland) Marcus Grönholm | (Finland) Timo Rautiainen | (France) Peugeot Total | Peugeot 206 WRC | 3:35:51.7 | +1:42.7 | 3 |
| 5 | 4 | 11 | (Norway) Petter Solberg | (United Kingdom) Phil Mills | (Japan) 555 Subaru World Rally Team | Subaru Impreza S7 WRC '01 | 3:36:10.6 | +2:01.6 | 2 |
| 6 | 5 | 5 | (United Kingdom) Colin McRae | (United Kingdom) Nicky Grist | (United Kingdom) Ford Motor Co. Ltd. | Ford Focus RS WRC '02 | 3:37:36.3 | +3:27.3 | 1 |
| 8 | 6 | 6 | (Estonia) Markko Märtin | (United Kingdom) Michael Park | (United Kingdom) Ford Motor Co. Ltd. | Ford Focus RS WRC '01 | 3:37:52.9 | +3:43.9 | 0 |
| 9 | 7 | 7 | (France) François Delecour | (France) Daniel Grataloup | (Japan) Marlboro Mitsubishi Ralliart | Mitsubishi Lancer WRC | 3:39:37.6 | +5:28.6 | 0 |
| 10 | 8 | 18 | (Belgium) Freddy Loix | (Belgium) Sven Smeets | (South Korea) Hyundai Castrol World Rally Team | Hyundai Accent WRC3 | 3:39:39.6 | +5:30.6 | 0 |
| 11 | 9 | 15 | (Finland) Toni Gardemeister | (Finland) Paavo Lukander | (Czech Republic) Škoda Motorsport | Škoda Octavia WRC Evo2 | 3:39:44.2 | +5:35.2 | 0 |
| 13 | 10 | 8 | (United Kingdom) Alister McRae | (United Kingdom) David Senior | (Japan) Marlboro Mitsubishi Ralliart | Mitsubishi Lancer WRC | 3:42:30.8 | +8:21.8 | 0 |
| 16 | 11 | 17 | (Germany) Armin Schwarz | (Germany) Manfred Hiemer | (South Korea) Hyundai Castrol World Rally Team | Hyundai Accent WRC3 | 3:44:49.7 | +10:40.7 | 0 |
| 17 | 12 | 14 | (Sweden) Kenneth Eriksson | (Sweden) Tina Thörner | (Czech Republic) Škoda Motorsport | Škoda Octavia WRC Evo2 | 3:48:04.8 | +13:55.8 | 0 |
| Retired SS10 | | 4 | (Spain) Carlos Sainz | (Spain) Marc Martí | (United Kingdom) Ford Motor Co. Ltd. | Ford Focus RS WRC '02 | Accident | | 0 |
| Retired SS9 | | 10 | (Finland) Tommi Mäkinen | (Finland) Kaj Lindström | (Japan) 555 Subaru World Rally Team | Subaru Impreza S7 WRC '01 | Engine | | 0 |
| Retired SS9 | | 16 | (Sweden) Stig Blomqvist | (Venezuela) Ana Goñi | (Czech Republic) Škoda Motorsport | Škoda Octavia WRC Evo2 | Engine | | 0 |

==== Special stages ====
| Day | Stage | Stage name | Length | Winner | Car | Time | Class leaders |
|---|---|---|---|---|---|---|---|
| Leg 1 (22 Mar) | SS1 | Riudecanyes 1 | 12.66 km | Stage cancelled | | | |
| Leg 1 (22 Mar) | SS2 | Pratdip 1 | 27.65 km | (France) Gilles Panizzi | Peugeot 206 WRC | 16:37.8 | (France) Gilles Panizzi |
| Leg 1 (22 Mar) | SS3 | Escaladei 1 | 48.05 km | (France) Gilles Panizzi | Peugeot 206 WRC | 29:17.6 | (France) Gilles Panizzi |
| Leg 1 (22 Mar) | SS4 | Riudecanyes 2 | 12.66 km | (France) Gilles Panizzi | Peugeot 206 WRC | 8:32.4 | (France) Gilles Panizzi |
| Leg 1 (22 Mar) | SS5 | Pratdip 2 | 27.65 km | (France) Gilles Panizzi | Peugeot 206 WRC | 16:44.2 | (France) Gilles Panizzi |
| Leg 1 (22 Mar) | SS6 | Escaladei 2 | 48.05 km | (France) Gilles Panizzi | Peugeot 206 WRC | 29:19.6 | (France) Gilles Panizzi |
| Leg 2 (23 Mar) | SS7 | Coll de Bracons 1 | 19.66 km | Stage cancelled | | | (France) Gilles Panizzi |
| Leg 2 (23 Mar) | SS8 | Vallfogona 1 | 14.54 km | Stage cancelled | | | (France) Gilles Panizzi |
| Leg 2 (23 Mar) | SS9 | Les Llosses — Alpens 1 | 21.80 km | (France) Gilles Panizzi | Peugeot 206 WRC | 13:19.9 | (France) Gilles Panizzi |
| Leg 2 (23 Mar) | SS10 | Coll de Bracons 2 | 19.66 km | (Norway) Petter Solberg | Subaru Impreza S7 WRC '01 | 12:44.3 | (France) Gilles Panizzi |
| Leg 2 (23 Mar) | SS11 | Vallfogona 2 | 14.54 km | (France) Gilles Panizzi | Peugeot 206 WRC | 8:30.3 | (France) Gilles Panizzi |
| Leg 2 (23 Mar) | SS12 | Les Llosses — Alpens 2 | 21.80 km | (France) Gilles Panizzi | Peugeot 206 WRC | 13:20.4 | (France) Gilles Panizzi |
| Leg 3 (24 Mar) | SS13 | La Trona 1 | 12.90 km | (United Kingdom) Richard Burns (France) Gilles Panizzi | Peugeot 206 WRC; Peugeot 206 WRC | 8:18.8 | (France) Gilles Panizzi |
| Leg 3 (24 Mar) | SS14 | La Roca 1 | 5.05 km | (Spain) Jesús Puras | Citroën Xsara WRC | 3:02.1 | (France) Gilles Panizzi |
| Leg 3 (24 Mar) | SS15 | Viladrau 1 | 35.18 km | (United Kingdom) Richard Burns | Peugeot 206 WRC | 21:14.9 | (France) Gilles Panizzi |
| Leg 3 (24 Mar) | SS16 | La Trona 2 | 12.90 km | (France) Gilles Panizzi | Peugeot 206 WRC | 8:17.9 | (France) Gilles Panizzi |
| Leg 3 (24 Mar) | SS17 | La Roca 2 | 5.05 km | (France) Gilles Panizzi (Estonia) Markko Märtin | Peugeot 206 WRC; Ford Focus RS WRC '01 | 3:04.6 | (France) Gilles Panizzi |
| Leg 3 (24 Mar) | SS18 | Viladrau 2 | 35.18 km | (Norway) Petter Solberg | Subaru Impreza S7 WRC '01 | 21:23.7 | (France) Gilles Panizzi |

==== Championship standings ====
| Pos. | Drivers' championships | | | Co-drivers' championships | | | Manufacturers' championships | | |
| Pos. | Move | Driver | Points | Move | Co-driver | Points | Move | Manufacturer | Points |
|---|---|---|---|---|---|---|---|---|---|
| 1 | | (Finland) Marcus Grönholm | 21 | | (Finland) Timo Rautiainen | 21 | | (France) Peugeot Total | 52 |
| 2 | | (France) Gilles Panizzi | 20 | | (France) Hervé Panizzi | 20 | | (United Kingdom) Ford Motor Co. Ltd. | 25 |
| 3 | 2 | (United Kingdom) Richard Burns | 13 | 2 | (United Kingdom) Robert Reid | 13 | | (Japan) 555 Subaru World Rally Team | 20 |
| 4 | 1 | (Finland) Tommi Mäkinen | 10 | 1 | (Finland) Kaj Lindström | 10 | | (Japan) Marlboro Mitsubishi Ralliart | 6 |
| 5 | 1 | (Spain) Carlos Sainz | 9 | 1 | (Spain) Luis Moya | 9 | | (South Korea) Hyundai Castrol World Rally Team | 1 |

=== Junior World Rally Championship ===
==== Classification ====
| Position | | No. | Driver | Co-driver | Entrant | Car | Time | Difference | Points |
| Event | Class | No. | Driver | Co-driver | Entrant | Car | Time | Difference | Points |
|---|---|---|---|---|---|---|---|---|---|
| 19 | 1 | 65 | (Spain) Daniel Solà | (Spain) Álex Romaní | (France) Citroën Sport | Citroën Saxo S1600 | 3:52:11.5 | | 10 |
| 20 | 2 | 51 | (Italy) Andrea Dallavilla | (Italy) Giovanni Bernacchini | (Italy) Vieffe Corse SRL | Citroën Saxo S1600 | 3:53:01.8 | +50.3 | 6 |
| 21 | 3 | 53 | (Italy) Giandomenico Basso | (Italy) Luigi Pirollo | (Italy) Top Run SRL | Fiat Punto S1600 | 3:54:25.6 | +2:14.1 | 4 |
| 23 | 4 | 64 | (Italy) Gianluigi Galli | (Italy) Guido D'Amore | (Italy) Top Run SRL | Fiat Punto S1600 | 3:58:46.3 | +6:34.8 | 3 |
| 24 | 5 | 62 | (Finland) Janne Tuohino | (Finland) Petri Vihavainen | (France) Citroën Sport | Citroën Saxo S1600 | 3:59:31.3 | +7:19.8 | 2 |
| 25 | 6 | 55 | (Belgium) François Duval | (Belgium) Jean-Marc Fortin | (United Kingdom) Ford Motor Co. Ltd. | Ford Puma S1600 | 3:59:33.1 | +7:21.6 | 1 |
| 26 | 7 | 57 | (Paraguay) Alejandro Galanti | (Spain) Xavier Amigó | (Italy) Astra Racing | Ford Puma S1600 | 4:02:40.2 | +10:28.7 | 0 |
| 28 | 8 | 68 | (Germany) Nikolaus Schelle | (Germany) Gerhard Weiss | (Japan) Suzuki Sport | Suzuki Ignis S1600 | 4:04:35.2 | +12:23.7 | 0 |
| 29 | 9 | 71 | (Austria) David Doppelreiter | (Austria) Thomas Lettner | (Austria) Schmidt Racing | Peugeot 206 S1600 | 4:06:25.8 | +14:14.3 | 0 |
| 30 | 10 | 63 | (United Kingdom) Martin Rowe | (United Kingdom) Chris Wood | (Italy) Astra Racing | Ford Puma S1600 | 4:10:42.4 | +18:30.9 | 0 |
| 31 | 11 | 59 | (Finland) Juha Kangas | (Finland) Jani Laaksonen | (Japan) Suzuki Sport | Suzuki Ignis S1600 | 4:10:43.3 | +18:31.8 | 0 |
| 33 | 12 | 73 | (Andorra) Albert Lloverá | (Spain) Marc Corral | (Spain) Pronto Racing | Fiat Punto S1600 | 4:15:49.0 | +23:37.5 | 0 |
| 34 | 13 | 70 | (Germany) Sven Haaf | (Germany) Michael Kölbach | (France) Citroën Sport | Citroën Saxo S1600 | 4:16:01.1 | +23:49.6 | 0 |
| 35 | 14 | 77 | (Spain) Paco Roig | (Spain) Joan Sureda | (Spain) Fiat Auto España | Fiat Punto S1600 | 4:18:01.9 | +25:50.4 | 0 |
| Retired SS18 | | 75 | (Japan) Kazuhiko Niwa | (Japan) Kohei Kusaka | (Japan) Suzuki Sport | Suzuki Ignis S1600 | Accident | | 0 |
| Retired SS13 | | 60 | (Italy) Nicola Caldani | (Italy) Sauro Farnocchia | (Italy) Procar Rally Team | Peugeot 206 S1600 | Retired | | 0 |
| Retired SS11 | | 61 | (United Kingdom) Gwyndaf Evans | (United Kingdom) Chris Patterson | (United Kingdom) MG Sport & Racing | MG ZR S1600 | Accident | | 0 |
| Retired SS9 | | 52 | (United Kingdom) Niall McShea | (United Kingdom) Michael Orr | (Germany) Opel Motorsport | Opel Corsa S1600 | Suspension | | 0 |
| Retired SS9 | | 66 | (San Marino) Mirco Baldacci | (Italy) Maurizio Barone | (Italy) Vieffe Corse SRL | Citroën Saxo S1600 | Suspension | | 0 |
| Retired SS6 | | 67 | (Sweden) Daniel Carlsson | (Sweden) Mattias Andersson | (Italy) Astra Racing | Ford Puma S1600 | Engine | | 0 |
| Retired SS6 | | 78 | (Lebanon) Roger Feghali | (Italy) Nicola Arena | (Italy) Astra Racing | Ford Puma S1600 | Accident | | 0 |
| Retired SS3 | | 54 | (Norway) Martin Stenshorne | (Finland) Jakke Honkanen | (Finland) ST Motors | Peugeot 206 S1600 | Mechanical | | 0 |
| Retired SS3 | | 58 | (Italy) Christian Chemin | (Italy) Simone Scattolin | (Italy) Hawk Racing Club | Fiat Punto S1600 | Excluded | | 0 |
| Retired SS3 | | 69 | (Finland) Kosti Katajamäki | (Finland) Lasse Hirvijärvi | (Germany) Volkswagen Racing | Volkswagen Polo S1600 | Driveshaft | | 0 |
| Retired SS2 | | 56 | (Finland) Jussi Välimäki | (Finland) Tero Gardemeister | (France) Citroën Sport | Citroën Saxo S1600 | Accident | | 0 |
| Retired SS2 | | 76 | (Norway) Alexander Foss | (Norway) Cato Menkerud | (United Kingdom) Ford Motor Co. Ltd. | Ford Puma S1600 | Accident | | 0 |

==== Special stages ====
| Day | Stage | Stage name | Length | Winner | Car | Time | Class leaders |
|---|---|---|---|---|---|---|---|
| Leg 1 (22 Mar) | SS1 | Riudecanyes 1 | 12.66 km | Stage cancelled | | | |
| Leg 1 (22 Mar) | SS2 | Pratdip 1 | 27.65 km | (Spain) Daniel Solà | Citroën Saxo S1600 | 18:14.2 | (Spain) Daniel Solà |
| Leg 1 (22 Mar) | SS3 | Escaladei 1 | 48.05 km | (Italy) Andrea Dallavilla | Citroën Saxo S1600 | 31:25.4 | (Italy) Andrea Dallavilla |
| Leg 1 (22 Mar) | SS4 | Riudecanyes 2 | 12.66 km | (Spain) Daniel Solà | Citroën Saxo S1600 | 9:14.5 | (Italy) Andrea Dallavilla |
| Leg 1 (22 Mar) | SS5 | Pratdip 2 | 27.65 km | (Italy) Andrea Dallavilla | Citroën Saxo S1600 | 18:11.8 | (Italy) Andrea Dallavilla |
| Leg 1 (22 Mar) | SS6 | Escaladei 2 | 48.05 km | (Italy) Andrea Dallavilla | Citroën Saxo S1600 | 31:36.3 | (Italy) Andrea Dallavilla |
| Leg 2 (23 Mar) | SS7 | Coll de Bracons 1 | 19.66 km | Stage cancelled | | | (Italy) Andrea Dallavilla |
| Leg 2 (23 Mar) | SS8 | Vallfogona 1 | 14.54 km | Stage cancelled | | | (Italy) Andrea Dallavilla |
| Leg 2 (23 Mar) | SS9 | Les Llosses — Alpens 1 | 21.80 km | (Spain) Daniel Solà | Citroën Saxo S1600 | 14:18.2 | (Italy) Andrea Dallavilla |
| Leg 2 (23 Mar) | SS10 | Coll de Bracons 2 | 19.66 km | (Spain) Daniel Solà | Citroën Saxo S1600 | 13:43.3 | (Italy) Andrea Dallavilla |
| Leg 2 (23 Mar) | SS11 | Vallfogona 2 | 14.54 km | (Belgium) François Duval | Ford Puma S1600 | 9:06.0 | (Spain) Daniel Solà |
| Leg 2 (23 Mar) | SS12 | Les Llosses — Alpens 2 | 21.80 km | (Belgium) François Duval | Ford Puma S1600 | 14:22.4 | (Spain) Daniel Solà |
| Leg 3 (24 Mar) | SS13 | La Trona 1 | 12.90 km | (Spain) Daniel Solà | Citroën Saxo S1600 | 8:55.2 | (Spain) Daniel Solà |
| Leg 3 (24 Mar) | SS14 | La Roca 1 | 5.05 km | (Spain) Daniel Solà | Citroën Saxo S1600 | 3:16.8 | (Spain) Daniel Solà |
| Leg 3 (24 Mar) | SS15 | Viladrau 1 | 35.18 km | (Italy) Andrea Dallavilla | Citroën Saxo S1600 | 23:06.3 | (Italy) Andrea Dallavilla |
| Leg 3 (24 Mar) | SS16 | La Trona 2 | 12.90 km | (Spain) Daniel Solà | Citroën Saxo S1600 | 8:54.8 | (Italy) Andrea Dallavilla |
| Leg 3 (24 Mar) | SS17 | La Roca 2 | 5.05 km | (Spain) Daniel Solà | Citroën Saxo S1600 | 3:17.9 | (Italy) Andrea Dallavilla |
| Leg 3 (24 Mar) | SS18 | Viladrau 2 | 35.18 km | (Spain) Daniel Solà | Citroën Saxo S1600 | 22:54.2 | (Spain) Daniel Solà |

==== Championship standings ====
| Pos. | Drivers' championships | | |
| Pos. | Move | Driver | Points |
|---|---|---|---|
| 1 | | (Belgium) François Duval | 11 |
| 2 | New entry | (Spain) Daniel Solà | 10 |
| 3 | 1 | (Italy) Nicola Caldani | 6 |
| 4 | New entry | (Italy) Andrea Dallavilla | 6 |
| 5 | 2 | (Lebanon) Roger Feghali | 4 |
