= Jutta Gebert =

- Born: 29 April 1968
- Died: 25 May 2002 (aged 34)
- Occupation: Rally co-driver

Jutta Gebert (29 April 1968 – 25 May 2002) was an Austrian female rally co-driver who served as Beppo Harrach's co-driver and competed in three rounds of the World Rally Championship in 2002.

She was killed at the 2002 Bosch 4. Super Rallye when Harrach's car crashed into a tree on the passenger side and injured Gebert so severely that there was no hope, and she would succumb to her injuries. She was 34 years old.

== Legacy ==
A rally sprint in Gebert's memory, held in August 2004, was called "Rallysprint Jutta Gebert Memorial" and won by Georg Reitsperger.
