= Top Run Motorsport =

(Italy) Top Run Motorsport
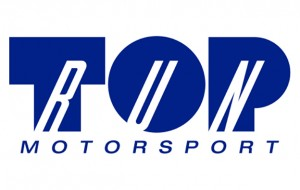
- Founded: 1977
- Team principal(s): Antonio Agnello
- Current series: TCR South America
- Former series: TCR International Series, TCR Europe, TCR Italy
- Noted drivers: TCR; 51. (Italy) Luca Rangoni
- Website: http://www.toprunracing.com/

Top Run Motorsport is an Italian auto racing team based in Castiglione Olona, Italy. The team currently races in the TCR International Series. Having previously rallied in the World Rally Championship, the team have won four Group N titles.

== TCR International Series ==
=== Subaru Impreza STi (2015–2017) ===
In April 2015 the team announced their plans to build a TCR-spec Subaru Impreza STi. The team announced their test drivers in August 2015, appointing Gian Maria Gabbiani and Roberto Russo, as the projects development drivers. They conducted their first test in early September, before confirming that the car would make its debut, as planned, in the Singapore round of the 2015 TCR International Series season. It was later announced that Luca Rangoni would drive for the team in Singapore.
