= Phil Mills =

British rally co-driver (born 1963)

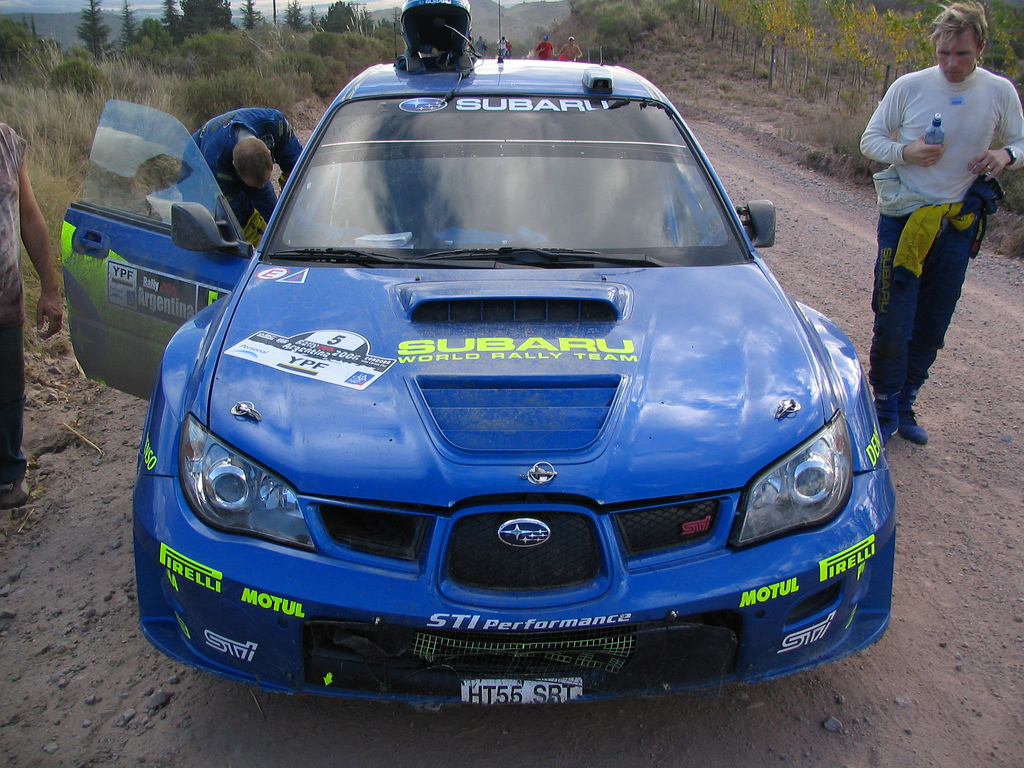
- Mills and Petter Solberg on the 2006 Rally Argentina

Personal information
- Nationality: (United Kingdom) British
- Full name: Philip Lewis Mills
- Born: 30 August 1963 (age 63); Trefeglwys, Wales

World Rally Championship record
- Years active: 1990, 1995, 1997–2010, 2018–2019
- Driver: (United Kingdom) Graham Middleton (Indonesia) Pratikto Singgih (Germany) Armin Schwarz (United Kingdom) Mark Higgins (Norway) Petter Solberg (United Kingdom) Elfyn Evans
- Teams: Ford, Nissan, Subaru
- Rallies: 164
- Championships: 1 (2003)
- Rally wins: 13
- Podiums: 40
- Stage wins: 356
- First rally: 1990 RAC Rally
- First win: 2002 Rally GB
- Last win: 2005 Wales Rally GB
- Last rally: 2019 Wales Rally GB

Philip Lewis Mills (born 30 August 1963) is a Welsh rallying co-driver. He was winner of the 2003 World Rally Championship (WRC), as co-driver to Petter Solberg.

Mills was born in Trefeglwys, Powys. He has a place in the Welsh Sports Hall of Fame, as the first Welshman to win the Wales Rally. His first rally was in 1983, and his WRC debut in 1990. He joined Solberg at Ford in 1999, later moving with him to the Subaru World Rally Team.

Mills lives with his partner Helen and their children in Powys.

On 11 June 2010, Mills announced his immediate retirement from co-driving to concentrate on his motorsport preparation business.

The 1–2 November, Mills returned to the WRC with Petter Solberg in the 2014 Rallye du Condroz with a Citroën C4 WRC. Mills later served as a co-driver for Elfyn Evans in the 2018 Tour de Corse, filling in for Daniel Barritt who suffered a concussion during the 2018 Rally Mexico. Mills also lent his voice as a co-driver in the 2019 racing video game Dirt Rally 2.0, and reunited with Solberg in the latter's final career rally, 2019 Wales Rally GB with a Volkswagen Polo GTI R5.

== Results ==
- 1984 class win in Wales Road Rally Championship
- 1992 and 1993 Welsh National Champion
- 1993 Team Co-ordinator for Ford at Rally GB
- 1996 2nd in British Championship with Mark Higgins, coordinated for M-Sport and Co-drives for Armin Schwarz in Corsica
- 1997 Wins British Rally Championship
- 1998 6th overall in WRC
- 1999 joins Petter Solberg at Ford, 18th in WRC
- 2000 both join Subaru – 10th in WRC
- 2001 10th in WRC
- 2002 2nd in WRC, 1 win (Wales)
- 2003 World Rally Champion, 4 wins (Cyprus, Australia, Corsica, Wales)
- 2004 2nd in WRC, 5 wins (New Zealand, Acropolis, Japan, Wales, Sardinia)
- 2005 2nd in WRC, 3 wins (Sweden, Mexico, Wales)
- 2006 6th in WRC
- 2007 5th in WRC
- 2008 6th in WRC
- 2009 5th in WRC

Between 1988 and 1990 he co-drove in 88 rallies.
