= Kaj Lindström =

Finnish rally co-driver (born 1969)

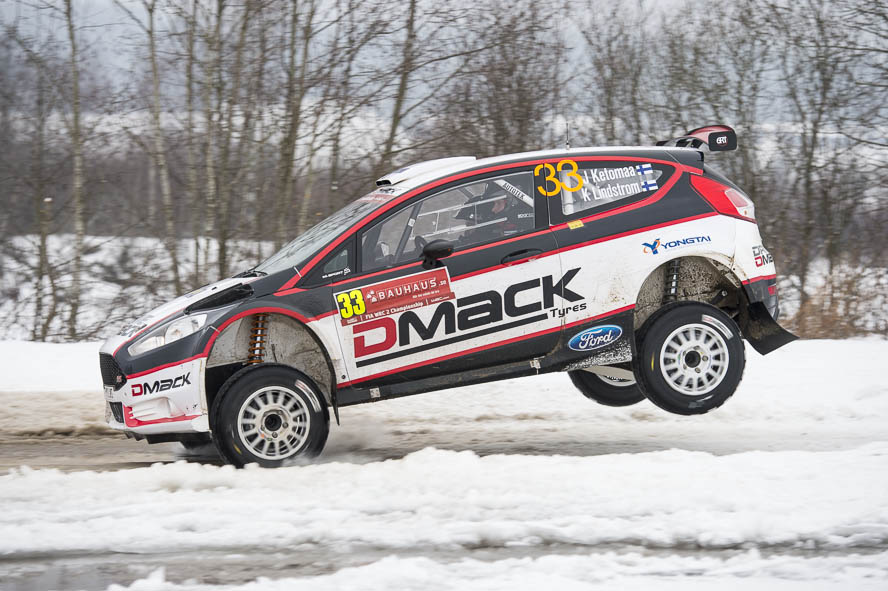
- Lindström competing at the 2014 Rally Finland

Personal information
- Nationality: (Finland) Finnish
- Born: 31 July 1969 (age 57)

World Rally Championship record
- Years active: 1996–2006, 2009–2015, 2017
- Driver: (Finland) Ari Himanen (Finland) Esa Saarenpää (Finland) Tapio Laukkanen (Finland) Tommi Mäkinen (Finland) Kristian Sohlberg (Sweden) Tobias Johansson (United Kingdom) Natalie Barratt (Finland) Kimi Räikkönen (Finland) Mikko Pajunen (Finland) Jari Ketomaa (Finland) Jarkko Nikara (Finland) Juho Hänninen
- Teams: Renault, Ford, Mitsubishi, Subaru, Citroën, Toyota
- Rallies: 110
- Rally wins: 1
- Podiums: 6
- Stage wins: 33
- First rally: 1996 1000 Lakes Rally
- First win: 2002 Monte Carlo Rally
- Last win: 2002 Monte Carlo Rally
- Last rally: 2017 Wales Rally GB

Kaj Lindström (born 31 July 1969) is a Finnish sporting director, who worked for Toyota Gazoo Racing WRT. Prior to this position, he was a rally co-driver.
