= Krzysztof Hołowczyc =

Polish rally driver (born 1962)

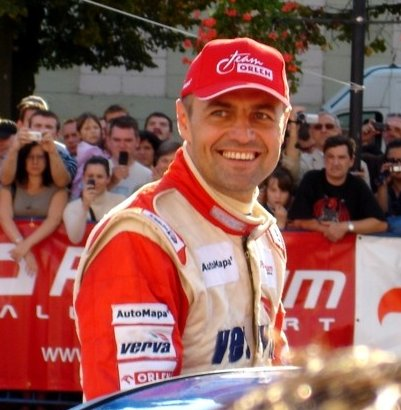
- Hołowczyc in 2007

Personal information
- Nationality: (Poland) Polish
- Full name: Krzysztof Wiesław Hołowczyc
- Born: 4 June 1962 (age 64); Olsztyn, Poland

World Rally Championship record
- Years active: 1996–2000, 2003, 2009, 2014-2015
- Co-driver: (Poland) Maciej Wisławski (Belgium) Jean-Marc Fortin (Poland) Łukasz Kurzeja
- Teams: Stomil Olsztyn Mobil 1, Turning Point, Stobart Ford
- Rallies: 21
- Championships: 0
- Rally wins: 0
- Podiums: 0
- Stage wins: 0
- Total points: 3
- First rally: 1996 Swedish Rally
- Last rally: 2015 Rally Poland

Krzysztof Wiesław Hołowczyc (pronounced [ˈkʂɨʂtɔf xɔˈwɔft͡ʂɨt͡s]; born 4 June 1962 in Olsztyn, Poland) is a Polish rally driver. He won the Polish Rally Championship in 1995, 1996 and 1999 and the European Rally Championship in 1997. He was also member of European Parliament (2007–2009) from Civic Platform list.

== Biography ==
Hołowczyc won the Polish Rally Championship in 1995, 1996, 1999. Also, he won the Rally Poland in 1996, 1998 and 2005.

In the World Rally Championship, Hołowczyc was active in the late 1990s, usually competing in a Subaru Impreza WRC. His seventh place at the 1998 Rally Argentina marked the best-ever result for a Polish driver in the series.

After the Rally Poland returned to the WRC calendar for the 2009 season, Hołowczyc signed to make a one-off return in a Ford Focus WRC run by Stobart M-Sport Ford. He finished sixth in the 2009 Rally Poland and scored Poland's second WRC points ever.

Hołowczyc took part in the Dakar Rally and finished 60th (2005), sixth (2009), fifth (2011), tenth (2012), sixth (2014) and third (2015). He also took part but did not finish the Rally due to car failure in 2006, 2010 and due to crash in 2007 and 2013.

Also, Hołowczyc won the Baja Poland in 2010, 2011, 2012, 2014 and 2015, and the Silk Way Rally in 2011.

== Racing record ==
=== Complete WRC results ===
Year	Entrant	Car	1	2	3	4	5	6	7	8	9	10	11	12	13	14	WDC	Pts
1996	Stomil Olsztyn Mobil 1 Rally Team	Toyota Celica Turbo 4WD	SWE; 20	KEN	IDN	GRE	ARG	FIN	AUS	ITA	ESP						NC	0
1997	Mobil 1 Stomil Olsztyn	Subaru Impreza 555	MON	SWE	KEN	POR	ESP	FRA	ARG	GRE	NZL	FIN	IDN	ITA	AUS	GBR; Ret	NC	0
1998	Mobil 1 Stomil Olsztyn	Subaru Impreza S3 WRC 97	MON	SWE	KEN	POR; 10	ESP; 13	FRA	ARG; 7	GRE	NZL	FIN	ITA; Ret	AUS	GBR; 8		NC	0
1999	Turning Point Rally Team	Subaru Impreza S4 WRC 98	MON	SWE; 15	KEN	POR; Ret	ESP	FRA	ARG	GRE	NZL	FIN	CHN	ITA	AUS	GBR; 13	NC	0
2000	Wizja TV Turning Point	Subaru Impreza S5 WRC 99	MON	SWE; 16	KEN	POR; Ret	ESP	ARG; Ret	GRE; Ret	NZL	FIN	CYP; Ret	FRA	ITA	GBR	AUS	NC	0
2003	Krzysztof Hołowczyc	Mitsubishi Lancer Evo VII	MON	SWE; 33	TUR	NZL; Ret	ARG	GRE	CYP	GER; Ret	FIN	AUS	ITA	FRA	ESP	GBR	NC	0
2009	Stobart VK M-Sport Ford Rally Team	Ford Focus RS WRC 08	IRE	NOR	CYP	POR	ARG	ITA	GRE	POL; 6	FIN	AUS	ESP	GBR			16th	3
2014	Lotto Team	Ford Fiesta RS WRC	MON	SWE	MEX	POR	ARG	ITA	POL; Ret	FIN	GER	AUS	FRA	ESP	GBR		NC	0
2015	Lotto Team	Ford Fiesta R5	MON	SWE	MEX	ARG	POR	ITA	POL; 24	FIN	GER	AUS	FRA	ESP	GBR		NC	0

=== Complete PWRC results ===
Year	Entrant	Car	1	2	3	4	5	6	7	PWRC	Points
2003	Krzysztof Hołowczyc	Mitsubishi Lancer Evo VII	SWE; 5	NZL; Ret	ARG	CYP	GER; Ret	AUS	FRA	16th	4

=== Complete Dakar Rally results ===
Year	Class	Vehicle	Position	Stages won
2005	Cars	(Japan) Mitsubishi	60th	0
2006	Cars	(Japan) Nissan	DNF	0
2007	Cars	(Japan) Nissan	DNF	0
2008	Event cancelled – replaced by the 2008 Central Europe Rally			
2009	Cars	(Japan) Nissan	5th	0
2010	Cars	(Japan) Nissan	DNF	0
2011	Cars	(Germany) BMW	5th	0
2012	Cars	(United Kingdom) Mini	9th	1
2013	Cars	(United Kingdom) Mini	DNF	0
2014	Cars	(United Kingdom) Mini	6th	0
2015	Cars	(United Kingdom) Mini	3rd	0

=== Complete FIA European Rallycross Championship results ===
==== Supercar ====
Year	Entrant	Car	1	2	3	4	5	ERX	Points
2016	Lotto Team	Ford Fiesta	BEL; 10	NOR; 11	SWE	BAR	LAT	17th	16

== Awards ==
For his sport achievements, he has received:

- Silver Cross of Merit in 2000;
- Golden Cross of Merit in 2005.

Sporting positions
Preceded by Armin Schwarz	European Rally Champion; 1997	Succeeded by Andrea Navarra
