= 2003 Rallye Deutschland =

8th round of the 2003 World Rally Championship

2003 Rallye Deutschland 22nd ADAC Rallye Deutschland
Round 8 of the 2003 World Rally Championship season
← Previous event	Next event →
- Host country: Germany
- Rally base: Trier
- Dates run: July 25, 2003 – July 27, 2003
- Stages: 22 (388.23 km; 241.23 miles)
- Stage surface: Asphalt
- Overall distance: 1,737.58 km (1,079.68 miles)

Statistics
- Crews: 79 at start, 44 at finish

Overall results
- Overall winner: (France) Sébastien Loeb (Monaco) Daniel Elena (France) Citroën Total WRT; Citroën Xsara WRC

The 2003 Rallye Deutschland (formally the 22nd ADAC Rallye Deutschland) was the eight round of the 2003 World Rally Championship. The race was held over three days between 25 July and 27 July 2003, and was based in Trier, Germany. Citroen's Sébastien Loeb won the race, his 3rd win in the World Rally Championship.

== Background ==
=== Entry list ===
No.	Driver	Co-Driver	Entrant	Car	Tyre
World Rally Championship manufacturer entries
1	(Finland) Marcus Grönholm	(Finland) Timo Rautiainen	(France) Marlboro Peugeot Total	Peugeot 206 WRC	MI
2	(United Kingdom) Richard Burns	(United Kingdom) Robert Reid	(France) Marlboro Peugeot Total	Peugeot 206 WRC	MI
3	(France) Gilles Panizzi	(France) Hervé Panizzi	(France) Marlboro Peugeot Total	Peugeot 206 WRC	MI
4	(Estonia) Markko Märtin	(United Kingdom) Michael Park	(United Kingdom) Ford Motor Co. Ltd.	Ford Focus RS WRC '03	MI
5	(Belgium) François Duval	(Belgium) Stéphane Prévot	(United Kingdom) Ford Motor Co. Ltd.	Ford Focus RS WRC '03	MI
6	(Finland) Mikko Hirvonen	(Finland) Jarmo Lehtinen	(United Kingdom) Ford Motor Co. Ltd.	Ford Focus RS WRC '02	MI
7	(Norway) Petter Solberg	(United Kingdom) Phil Mills	(Japan) 555 Subaru World Rally Team	Subaru Impreza S9 WRC '03	P
8	(Finland) Tommi Mäkinen	(Finland) Kaj Lindström	(Japan) 555 Subaru World Rally Team	Subaru Impreza S9 WRC '03	P
10	(Germany) Armin Schwarz	(Germany) Manfred Hiemer	(South Korea) Hyundai World Rally Team	Hyundai Accent WRC3	MI
11	(Belgium) Freddy Loix	(Belgium) Sven Smeets	(South Korea) Hyundai World Rally Team	Hyundai Accent WRC3	MI
12	(Austria) Manfred Stohl	(Austria) Ilka Minor	(South Korea) Hyundai World Rally Team	Hyundai Accent WRC3	MI
14	(France) Didier Auriol	(France) Denis Giraudet	(Czech Republic) Škoda Motorsport	Škoda Fabia WRC	MI
15	(Finland) Toni Gardemeister	(Finland) Paavo Lukander	(Czech Republic) Škoda Motorsport	Škoda Fabia WRC	MI
17	(United Kingdom) Colin McRae	(United Kingdom) Derek Ringer	(France) Citroën Total WRT	Citroën Xsara WRC	MI
18	(France) Sébastien Loeb	(Monaco) Daniel Elena	(France) Citroën Total WRT	Citroën Xsara WRC	MI
19	(Spain) Carlos Sainz	(Spain) Marc Martí	(France) Citroën Total WRT	Citroën Xsara WRC	MI
20	(France) Philippe Bugalski	(France) Jean-Paul Chiaroni	(France) Citroën Total WRT	Citroën Xsara WRC	MI
World Rally Championship entries
21	(France) Cédric Robert	(France) Gérald Bedon	Equipe de France FFSA	Peugeot 206 WRC	MI
22	(Germany) Matthias Kahle	(Germany) Peter Göbel	(Germany) Škoda Auto Deutschland	Škoda Octavia WRC Evo2	MI
23	(Czech Republic) Roman Kresta	(Czech Republic) Jan Tománek	(France) Bozian Racing	Peugeot 206 WRC	MI
24	(Finland) Jari-Matti Latvala	(Finland) Miikka Anttila	(United Kingdom) Ford Motor Co. Ltd.	Ford Focus RS WRC '02	MI
25	(United Kingdom) Justin Dale	(United Kingdom) Andrew Bargery	(South Korea) Hyundai World Rally Team	Hyundai Accent WRC3	MI
26	(Germany) Antony Warmbold	(United Kingdom) Gemma Price	(Germany) AW Rally Team	Ford Focus RS WRC '02	MI
27	(Czech Republic) Jan Kopecký	(Czech Republic) Filip Schovánek	(Czech Republic) Škoda Matador Team	Škoda Octavia WRC Evo2	MI
28	(Slovakia) Tibor Cserhalmi	(Czech Republic) Jaroslav Palivec	(Czech Republic) Mimex-Charouz Racing Systems	Ford Focus RS WRC '01	MI
32	(Finland) Jani Paasonen	(Finland) Arto Kapanen	(Finland) Jani Paasonen	Mitsubishi Lancer WRC2	MI
33	(Belgium) Pieter Tsjoen	(Belgium) Eddy Chevaillier	(Belgium) Pieter Tsjoen	Toyota Corolla WRC	MI
34	(Finland) Kristian Sohlberg	(Finland) Jakke Honkanen	(Finland) Mitsubishi Motors	Mitsubishi Lancer WRC2	MI
36	(United Kingdom) Alistair Ginley	(Republic of Ireland) Rory Kennedy	(United Kingdom) Alistair Ginley	Ford Focus RS WRC '01	MI
101	(Netherlands) Erik Wevers	(Netherlands) Michiel Poel	(Netherlands) Wevers Sport	Toyota Corolla WRC	MI
102	(Germany) Sandro Wallenwein	(Austria) Pauli Zeitlhofer	(Germany) Anton Werner	Mitsubishi Carisma GT Evo VII	—N/a
103	(Germany) Anton Werner	(Germany) Peter Kroll	(Germany) Anton Werner	Mitsubishi Lancer Evo VI	—N/a
112	(Germany) Frank Färber	(Germany) Thomas Schünemann	(Germany) Frank Färber	Mitsubishi Lancer Evo VI	—N/a
PWRC entries
51	(Malaysia) Karamjit Singh	(Malaysia) Allen Oh	(Malaysia) Petronas EON Racing Team	Proton Pert	—N/a
52	(Spain) Daniel Solà	(Spain) Álex Romaní	(Italy) Mauro Rally Tuning	Mitsubishi Lancer Evo VII	P
53	(Peru) Ramón Ferreyros	(Mexico) Javier Marín	(Italy) Mauro Rally Tuning	Mitsubishi Lancer Evo VII	P
55	(United Kingdom) Martin Rowe	(United Kingdom) Trevor Agnew	(United Kingdom) David Sutton Cars Ltd	Subaru Impreza WRX STI N10	—N/a
57	(Italy) Giovanni Manfrinato	(Italy) Claudio Condotta	(Italy) Top Run SRL	Mitsubishi Lancer Evo VII	—N/a
58	(Argentina) Marcos Ligato	(Argentina) Rubén García	(Italy) Top Run SRL	Mitsubishi Lancer Evo VII	—N/a
59	(Italy) Stefano Marrini	(Italy) Massimo Agostinelli	(Italy) Top Run SRL	Mitsubishi Lancer Evo VII	—N/a
60	(United Kingdom) Niall McShea	(United Kingdom) Chris Patterson	(New Zealand) Neil Allport Motorsports	Mitsubishi Lancer Evo VI	MI
61	(Poland) Janusz Kulig	(Poland) Maciej Szczepaniak	Mobil 1 Team Poland	Mitsubishi Lancer Evo VI	—N/a
64	(Sweden) Joakim Roman	(Sweden) Ingrid Mitakidou	(Sweden) Milbrooks World Rally Team	Mitsubishi Lancer Evo V	—N/a
65	(Sweden) Stig Blomqvist	(Venezuela) Ana Goñi	(United Kingdom) David Sutton Cars Ltd	Subaru Impreza WRX STI N10	—N/a
67	(Poland) Krzysztof Hołowczyc	(Poland) Łukasz Kurzeja	(Poland) Orlen Team	Mitsubishi Lancer Evo VII	—N/a
69	(Belgium) Bob Colsoul	(Belgium) Tom Colsoul	(Belgium) Guy Colsoul Rallysport	Mitsubishi Lancer Evo VII	—N/a
70	(Italy) Riccardo Errani	(Italy) Stefano Casadio	(Italy) Errani Team Group	Mitsubishi Lancer Evo VI	—N/a
71	(Bulgaria) Georgi Geradzhiev Jr.	(Bulgaria) Nikola Popov	(Bulgaria) Racing Team Bulgartabac	Mitsubishi Lancer Evo VII	—N/a
72	(Romania) Constantin Aur	(Romania) Adrian Berghea	(Austria) Stohl Racing	Mitsubishi Lancer Evo VII	—N/a
74	(Italy) Fabio Frisiero	(Italy) Giovanni Agnese	(Italy) Motoring Club	Mitsubishi Lancer Evo VII	—N/a
76	(Canada) Patrick Richard	(Norway) Ola Fløene	Subaru Rally Team Canada	Subaru Impreza STI N9	—N/a
77	(Italy) Alfredo De Dominicis	(Italy) Giovanni Bernacchini	Ralliart Italy	Mitsubishi Lancer Evo VII	—N/a
80	(Mexico) Ricardo Triviño	(Spain) Jordi Barrabés	(Mexico) Triviño Racing	Mitsubishi Lancer Evo VII	—N/a

=== Itinerary ===
All dates and times are CEST (UTC+2).

Date	Time	No.	Stage name	Distance
Leg 1 — 117.31 km
25 July	10:09	SS1	Stein und Wein — Ruwertal 1	17.21 km
25 July	10:52	SS2	Dhrontal 1	12.81 km
25 July	13:10	SS3	Maiwald	15.61 km
25 July	13:35	SS4	Panzerplatte Ost	35.42 km
25 July	16:21	SS5	Stein und Wein — Ruwertal 2	17.21 km
25 July	17:04	SS6	Dhrontal 2	12.81 km
25 July	20:05	SS7	St. Wendel 1	6.24 km
Leg 2 — 169.38 km
26 July	08:28	SS8	Bosenberg 1	17.02 km
26 July	09:21	SS9	Peterberg 1	10.55 km
26 July	10:54	SS10	Erzweiler 1	19.98 km
26 July	11:25	SS11	Panzerplatte West 1	34.02 km
26 July	13:53	SS12	Erzweiler 2	19.98 km
26 July	14:24	SS13	Panzerplatte West 2	34.02 km
26 July	16:27	SS14	Peterberg 2	10.55 km
26 July	17:15	SS15	Bosenberg 2	17.02 km
26 July	17:51	SS16	St. Wendel 2	6.24 km
Leg 3 — 101.54 km
27 July	07:28	SS17	Schönes Moselland 1	15.29 km
27 July	07:58	SS18	Moselwein 1	16.55 km
27 July	09:16	SS19	St. Wendeler Land 1	18.93 km
27 July	11:56	SS20	Schönes Moselland 2	15.29 km
27 July	12:26	SS21	Moselwein 2	16.55 km
27 July	13:44	SS22	St. Wendeler Land 2	18.93 km

== Results ==
=== Overall ===
Pos.	No.	Driver	Co-driver	Team	Car	Time	Difference	Points
1	18	(France) Sébastien Loeb	(Monaco) Daniel Elena	(France) Citroën Total WRT	Citroën Xsara WRC	3:46:50.4		10
2	1	(Finland) Marcus Grönholm	(Finland) Timo Rautiainen	(France) Marlboro Peugeot Total	Peugeot 206 WRC	3:46:54.0	+3.6	8
3	2	(United Kingdom) Richard Burns	(United Kingdom) Robert Reid	(France) Marlboro Peugeot Total	Peugeot 206 WRC	3:47:10.1	+19.7	6
4	17	(United Kingdom) Colin McRae	(United Kingdom) Derek Ringer	(France) Citroën Total WRT	Citroën Xsara WRC	3:47:21.8	+31.4	5
5	4	(Estonia) Markko Märtin	(United Kingdom) Michael Park	(United Kingdom) Ford Motor Co. Ltd.	Ford Focus RS WRC '03	3:47:48.3	+57.9	4
6	19	(Spain) Carlos Sainz	(Spain) Marc Martí	(France) Citroën Total WRT	Citroën Xsara WRC	3:48:29.0	+1:38.6	3
7	5	(Belgium) François Duval	(Belgium) Stéphane Prévot	(United Kingdom) Ford Motor Co. Ltd.	Ford Focus RS WRC '03	3:48:38.5	+1:48.1	2
8	7	(Norway) Petter Solberg	(United Kingdom) Phil Mills	(Japan) 555 Subaru World Rally Team	Subaru Impreza S9 WRC '03	3:49:20.6	+2:30.2	1

=== World Rally Cars ===
==== Classification ====
Position		No.	Driver	Co-driver	Entrant	Car	Time	Difference	Points
Event	Class	No.	Driver	Co-driver	Entrant	Car	Time	Difference	Points
1	1	18	(France) Sébastien Loeb	(Monaco) Daniel Elena	(France) Citroën Total WRT	Citroën Xsara WRC	3:46:50.4		10
2	2	1	(Finland) Marcus Grönholm	(Finland) Timo Rautiainen	(France) Marlboro Peugeot Total	Peugeot 206 WRC	3:46:54.0	+3.6	8
3	3	2	(United Kingdom) Richard Burns	(United Kingdom) Robert Reid	(France) Marlboro Peugeot Total	Peugeot 206 WRC	3:47:10.1	+19.7	6
4	4	17	(United Kingdom) Colin McRae	(United Kingdom) Derek Ringer	(France) Citroën Total WRT	Citroën Xsara WRC	3:47:21.8	+31.4	5
5	5	4	(Estonia) Markko Märtin	(United Kingdom) Michael Park	(United Kingdom) Ford Motor Co. Ltd.	Ford Focus RS WRC '03	3:47:48.3	+57.9	4
6	6	19	(Spain) Carlos Sainz	(Spain) Marc Martí	(France) Citroën Total WRT	Citroën Xsara WRC	3:48:29.0	+1:38.6	3
7	7	5	(Belgium) François Duval	(Belgium) Stéphane Prévot	(United Kingdom) Ford Motor Co. Ltd.	Ford Focus RS WRC '03	3:48:38.5	+1:48.1	2
8	8	7	(Norway) Petter Solberg	(United Kingdom) Phil Mills	(Japan) 555 Subaru World Rally Team	Subaru Impreza S9 WRC '03	3:49:20.6	+2:30.2	1
10	9	3	(France) Gilles Panizzi	(France) Hervé Panizzi	(France) Marlboro Peugeot Total	Peugeot 206 WRC	3:50:30.0	+3:39.6	0
11	10	11	(Belgium) Freddy Loix	(Belgium) Sven Smeets	(South Korea) Hyundai World Rally Team	Hyundai Accent WRC3	3:51:46.0	+4:55.6	0
12	11	10	(Germany) Armin Schwarz	(Germany) Manfred Hiemer	(South Korea) Hyundai World Rally Team	Hyundai Accent WRC3	3:54:05.6	+7:15.2	0
13	12	6	(Finland) Mikko Hirvonen	(Finland) Jarmo Lehtinen	(United Kingdom) Ford Motor Co. Ltd.	Ford Focus RS WRC '02	3:54:24.7	+7:34.3	0
18	13	12	(Austria) Manfred Stohl	(Austria) Ilka Minor	(South Korea) Hyundai World Rally Team	Hyundai Accent WRC3	4:02:58.3	+16:07.9	0
Retired SS13		15	(Finland) Toni Gardemeister	(Finland) Paavo Lukander	(Czech Republic) Škoda Motorsport	Škoda Fabia WRC	Rear axle-shaft		0
Retired SS11		20	(France) Philippe Bugalski	(France) Jean-Paul Chiaroni	(France) Citroën Total WRT	Citroën Xsara WRC	Turbo		0
Retired SS7		8	(Finland) Tommi Mäkinen	(Finland) Kaj Lindström	(Japan) 555 Subaru World Rally Team	Subaru Impreza S9 WRC '03	Alternator		0
Retired SS7		14	(France) Didier Auriol	(France) Denis Giraudet	(Czech Republic) Škoda Motorsport	Škoda Fabia WRC	Engine		0

==== Special stages ====
Day	Stage	Stage name	Length	Winner	Car	Time	Class leaders
Leg 1 (25 Jul)	SS1	Stein und Wein — Ruwertal 1	17.21 km	(United Kingdom) Richard Burns	Peugeot 206 WRC	9:37.5	(United Kingdom) Richard Burns
Leg 1 (25 Jul)	SS2	Dhrontal 1	12.81 km	(United Kingdom) Richard Burns	Peugeot 206 WRC	8:08.1	(United Kingdom) Richard Burns
Leg 1 (25 Jul)	SS3	Maiwald	15.61 km	(Estonia) Markko Märtin	Ford Focus RS WRC '03	9:01.4	(United Kingdom) Richard Burns
Leg 1 (25 Jul)	SS4	Panzerplatte Ost	35.42 km	(Estonia) Markko Märtin	Ford Focus RS WRC '03	20:34.7	(Estonia) Markko Märtin
Leg 1 (25 Jul)	SS5	Stein und Wein — Ruwertal 2	17.21 km	(United Kingdom) Richard Burns	Peugeot 206 WRC	9:37.8	(United Kingdom) Richard Burns
Leg 1 (25 Jul)	SS6	Dhrontal 2	12.81 km	(France) Sébastien Loeb	Citroën Xsara WRC	8:00.7	(United Kingdom) Richard Burns
Leg 1 (25 Jul)	SS7	St. Wendel 1	6.24 km	(United Kingdom) Richard Burns	Peugeot 206 WRC	3:24.7	(United Kingdom) Richard Burns
Leg 2 (26 Jul)	SS8	Bosenberg 1	17.02 km	(Finland) Marcus Grönholm	Peugeot 206 WRC	9:16.8	(United Kingdom) Richard Burns
Leg 2 (26 Jul)	SS9	Peterberg 1	10.55 km	(Estonia) Markko Märtin	Ford Focus RS WRC '03	6:09.5	(Finland) Marcus Grönholm
Leg 2 (26 Jul)	SS10	Erzweiler 1	19.98 km	(Estonia) Markko Märtin	Ford Focus RS WRC '03	11:45.6	(Finland) Marcus Grönholm
Leg 2 (26 Jul)	SS11	Panzerplatte West 1	34.02 km	(Estonia) Markko Märtin	Ford Focus RS WRC '03	19:31.9	(Finland) Marcus Grönholm
Leg 2 (26 Jul)	SS12	Erzweiler 2	19.98 km	(France) Sébastien Loeb	Citroën Xsara WRC	11:40.6	(Finland) Marcus Grönholm
Leg 2 (26 Jul)	SS13	Panzerplatte West 2	34.02 km	(Estonia) Markko Märtin	Ford Focus RS WRC '03	19:01.6	(France) Sébastien Loeb
Leg 2 (26 Jul)	SS14	Peterberg 2	10.55 km	(Finland) Marcus Grönholm	Peugeot 206 WRC	6:25.4	(France) Sébastien Loeb
Leg 2 (26 Jul)	SS15	Bosenberg 2	17.02 km	(Estonia) Markko Märtin	Ford Focus RS WRC '03	8:56.5	(France) Sébastien Loeb
Leg 2 (26 Jul)	SS16	St. Wendel 2	6.24 km	(Czech Republic) Roman Kresta	Peugeot 206 WRC	3:38.0	(France) Sébastien Loeb
Leg 3 (27 Jul)	SS17	Schönes Moselland 1	15.29 km	(United Kingdom) Colin McRae	Citroën Xsara WRC	9:03.6	(France) Sébastien Loeb
Leg 3 (27 Jul)	SS18	Moselwein 1	16.55 km	(United Kingdom) Colin McRae	Citroën Xsara WRC	10:04.5	(France) Sébastien Loeb
Leg 3 (27 Jul)	SS19	St. Wendeler Land 1	18.93 km	(Spain) Carlos Sainz	Citroën Xsara WRC	9:52.6	(France) Sébastien Loeb
Leg 3 (27 Jul)	SS20	Schönes Moselland 2	15.29 km	(Estonia) Markko Märtin	Ford Focus RS WRC '03	9:25.7	(France) Sébastien Loeb
Leg 3 (27 Jul)	SS21	Moselwein 2	16.55 km	(Estonia) Markko Märtin	Ford Focus RS WRC '03	10:31.2	(France) Sébastien Loeb
Leg 3 (27 Jul)	SS22	St. Wendeler Land 2	18.93 km	(Estonia) Markko Märtin	Ford Focus RS WRC '03	10:32.3	(France) Sébastien Loeb

==== Championship standings ====
Pos.	Drivers' championships			Co-drivers' championships			Manufacturers' championships		
Pos.	Move	Driver	Points	Move	Co-driver	Points	Move	Manufacturer	Points
1		(United Kingdom) Richard Burns	43		(United Kingdom) Robert Reid	43		(France) Marlboro Peugeot Total	95
2		(Spain) Carlos Sainz	39		(Spain) Marc Martí	39		(France) Citroën Total WRT	88
3		(Finland) Marcus Grönholm	38		(Finland) Timo Rautiainen	38	1	(United Kingdom) Ford Motor Co. Ltd.	50
4	1	(France) Sébastien Loeb	33	1	(Monaco) Daniel Elena	33	1	(Japan) 555 Subaru World Rally Team	49
5	1	(Norway) Petter Solberg	30	1	(United Kingdom) Phil Mills	30		(Czech Republic) Škoda Motorsport	20

=== Production World Rally Championship ===
==== Classification ====
Position		No.	Driver	Co-driver	Entrant	Car	Time	Difference	Points
Event	Class	No.	Driver	Co-driver	Entrant	Car	Time	Difference	Points
22	1	52	(Spain) Daniel Solà	(Spain) Álex Romaní	(Italy) Mauro Rally Tuning	Mitsubishi Lancer Evo VII	4:11:45.9		10
24	2	55	(United Kingdom) Martin Rowe	(United Kingdom) Trevor Agnew	(United Kingdom) David Sutton Cars Ltd	Subaru Impreza WRX STI N10	4:16:18.8	+4:32.9	8
26	3	61	(Poland) Janusz Kulig	(Poland) Maciej Szczepaniak	Mobil 1 Team Poland	Mitsubishi Lancer Evo VI	4:18:33.3	+6:47.4	6
27	4	51	(Malaysia) Karamjit Singh	(Malaysia) Allen Oh	(Malaysia) Petronas EON Racing Team	Proton Pert	4:20:53.5	+9:07.6	5
29	5	65	(Sweden) Stig Blomqvist	(Venezuela) Ana Goñi	(United Kingdom) David Sutton Cars Ltd	Subaru Impreza WRX STI N10	4:23:23.3	+11:37.4	4
34	6	80	(Mexico) Ricardo Triviño	(Spain) Jordi Barrabés	(Mexico) Triviño Racing	Mitsubishi Lancer Evo VII	4:31:18.2	+19:32.3	3
36	7	72	(Romania) Constantin Aur	(Romania) Adrian Berghea	(Austria) Stohl Racing	Mitsubishi Lancer Evo VII	4:37:23.9	+25:38.0	2
38	8	59	(Italy) Stefano Marrini	(Italy) Massimo Agostinelli	(Italy) Top Run SRL	Mitsubishi Lancer Evo VII	4:42:34.4	+30:48.5	1
39	9	70	(Italy) Riccardo Errani	(Italy) Stefano Casadio	(Italy) Errani Team Group	Mitsubishi Lancer Evo VI	4:42:34.8	+30:48.9	0
Retired SS22		77	(Italy) Alfredo De Dominicis	(Italy) Giovanni Bernacchini	Ralliart Italy	Mitsubishi Lancer Evo VII	Engine		0
Retired SS21		58	(Argentina) Marcos Ligato	(Argentina) Rubén García	(Italy) Top Run SRL	Mitsubishi Lancer Evo VII	Clutch		0
Retired SS18		71	(Bulgaria) Georgi Geradzhiev Jr.	(Bulgaria) Nikola Popov	(Bulgaria) Racing Team Bulgartabac	Mitsubishi Lancer Evo VII	Accident		0
Retired SS12		60	(United Kingdom) Niall McShea	(United Kingdom) Chris Patterson	(New Zealand) Neil Allport Motorsports	Mitsubishi Lancer Evo VI	Driveshaft		0
Retired SS11		53	(Peru) Ramón Ferreyros	(Mexico) Javier Marín	(Italy) Mauro Rally Tuning	Mitsubishi Lancer Evo VII	Electrical		0
Retired SS10		64	(Sweden) Joakim Roman	(Sweden) Ingrid Mitakidou	(Sweden) Milbrooks World Rally Team	Mitsubishi Lancer Evo V	Turbo		0
Retired SS4		57	(Italy) Giovanni Manfrinato	(Italy) Claudio Condotta	(Italy) Top Run SRL	Mitsubishi Lancer Evo VII	Accident		0
Retired SS4		76	(Canada) Patrick Richard	(Norway) Ola Fløene	Subaru Rally Team Canada	Subaru Impreza STI N9	Gearbox		0
Retired SS3		69	(Belgium) Bob Colsoul	(Belgium) Tom Colsoul	(Belgium) Guy Colsoul Rallysport	Mitsubishi Lancer Evo VII	Turbo		0
Retired SS2		67	(Poland) Krzysztof Hołowczyc	(Poland) Łukasz Kurzeja	(Poland) Orlen Team	Mitsubishi Lancer Evo VII	Fuel pump		0
Retired SS1		74	(Italy) Fabio Frisiero	(Italy) Giovanni Agnese	(Italy) Motoring Club	Mitsubishi Lancer Evo VII	Clutch		0

==== Special stages ====
Day	Stage	Stage name	Length	Winner	Car	Time	Class leaders
Leg 1 (25 Jul)	SS1	Stein und Wein — Ruwertal 1	17.21 km	(Spain) Daniel Solà	Mitsubishi Lancer Evo VII	10:39.2	(Spain) Daniel Solà
Leg 1 (25 Jul)	SS2	Dhrontal 1	12.81 km	(Spain) Daniel Solà	Mitsubishi Lancer Evo VII	8:53.9	(Spain) Daniel Solà
Leg 1 (25 Jul)	SS3	Maiwald	15.61 km	(Spain) Daniel Solà	Mitsubishi Lancer Evo VII	9:50.1	(Spain) Daniel Solà
Leg 1 (25 Jul)	SS4	Panzerplatte Ost	35.42 km	(Spain) Daniel Solà	Mitsubishi Lancer Evo VII	22:09.2	(Spain) Daniel Solà
Leg 1 (25 Jul)	SS5	Stein und Wein — Ruwertal 2	17.21 km	(Spain) Daniel Solà	Mitsubishi Lancer Evo VII	10:29.9	(Spain) Daniel Solà
Leg 1 (25 Jul)	SS6	Dhrontal 2	12.81 km	(United Kingdom) Niall McShea	Mitsubishi Lancer Evo VI	8:50.0	(Spain) Daniel Solà
Leg 1 (25 Jul)	SS7	St. Wendel 1	6.24 km	(Spain) Daniel Solà	Mitsubishi Lancer Evo VII	3:46.8	(Spain) Daniel Solà
Leg 2 (26 Jul)	SS8	Bosenberg 1	17.02 km	(United Kingdom) Niall McShea	Mitsubishi Lancer Evo VI	10:11.1	(Spain) Daniel Solà
Leg 2 (26 Jul)	SS9	Peterberg 1	10.55 km	(United Kingdom) Niall McShea	Mitsubishi Lancer Evo VI	6:44.1	(Spain) Daniel Solà
Leg 2 (26 Jul)	SS10	Erzweiler 1	19.98 km	(Spain) Daniel Solà	Mitsubishi Lancer Evo VII	12:53.5	(Spain) Daniel Solà
Leg 2 (26 Jul)	SS11	Panzerplatte West 1	34.02 km	(United Kingdom) Niall McShea	Mitsubishi Lancer Evo VI	21:40.4	(Spain) Daniel Solà
Leg 2 (26 Jul)	SS12	Erzweiler 2	19.98 km	(Spain) Daniel Solà	Mitsubishi Lancer Evo VII	12:47.2	(Spain) Daniel Solà
Leg 2 (26 Jul)	SS13	Panzerplatte West 2	34.02 km	(Spain) Daniel Solà	Mitsubishi Lancer Evo VII	20:51.8	(Spain) Daniel Solà
Leg 2 (26 Jul)	SS14	Peterberg 2	10.55 km	(Argentina) Marcos Ligato	Mitsubishi Lancer Evo VII	7:07.9	(Spain) Daniel Solà
Leg 2 (26 Jul)	SS15	Bosenberg 2	17.02 km	(Spain) Daniel Solà	Mitsubishi Lancer Evo VII	10:27.5	(Spain) Daniel Solà
Leg 2 (26 Jul)	SS16	St. Wendel 2	6.24 km	(Italy) Alfredo De Dominicis	Mitsubishi Lancer Evo VII	4:04.2	(Spain) Daniel Solà
Leg 3 (27 Jul)	SS17	Schönes Moselland 1	15.29 km	(United Kingdom) Martin Rowe	Subaru Impreza WRX STI N10	10:10.1	(Spain) Daniel Solà
Leg 3 (27 Jul)	SS18	Moselwein 1	16.55 km	(Argentina) Marcos Ligato	Mitsubishi Lancer Evo VII	11:20.3	(Spain) Daniel Solà
Leg 3 (27 Jul)	SS19	St. Wendeler Land 1	18.93 km	(Spain) Daniel Solà	Mitsubishi Lancer Evo VII	12:30.5	(Spain) Daniel Solà
Leg 3 (27 Jul)	SS20	Schönes Moselland 2	15.29 km	(Argentina) Marcos Ligato	Mitsubishi Lancer Evo VII	10:38.4	(Spain) Daniel Solà
Leg 3 (27 Jul)	SS21	Moselwein 2	16.55 km	(Poland) Janusz Kulig	Mitsubishi Lancer Evo VI	11:57.5	(Spain) Daniel Solà
Leg 3 (27 Jul)	SS22	St. Wendeler Land 2	18.93 km	(Poland) Janusz Kulig	Mitsubishi Lancer Evo VI	12:05.2	(Spain) Daniel Solà

==== Championship standings ====
Pos.	Drivers' championships		
Pos.	Move	Driver	Points
1		(Japan) Toshihiro Arai	30
2		(United Kingdom) Martin Rowe	27
3	1	(Malaysia) Karamjit Singh	22
4	1	(Sweden) Stig Blomqvist	21
5	1	(Spain) Daniel Solà	18
