= 2000 British Rally Championship =

The 2000 Mobil 1 British Rally Championship was won by Finland's Marko Ipatti in a Group N Mitsubishi Lancer Evolution 6 ahead of Vauxhall drivers Mark Higgins and Neil Wearden. The 1600cc category championship was won by Proton's Mats Andersson with the Group N title going to Gavin Cox. This was the last year that the championship ran to the F2 regulations.

Calendar

Round	Event	Date
1	Vauxhall Rally of Wales	18–19 March
2	Pirelli International Rally	6–7 May
3	Kumho Tyres Scottish Rally	10–11 June
4	SEAT Jim Clark Memorial Rally	30 June-2 July
5	MSA Rally	16 July
6	Manx International Rally	7–9 September

Driver Changes

Mark Higgins moved from Volkswagen to Vauxhall

SEAT, Ford and Renault had withdrawn from the BRC

Gwyndaf Evans left the series to concentrate on testing and development work for SEAT WRC team

Hyundai entered the series with Vauxhall refugee Jarmo Kytolehto and Australian Andrew Pinker driving for the team

David Higgins moved from a production Subaru to the works Peugeot team

Reigning champion Tapio Laukkanen moved to Volkswagen as their solo driver

Martin Rowe only made a one-off appearance for Ford in the new Puma rally car after Renault's withdrawal

Leading Entries

Team	Manufacturer	Car	No	Driver	Rounds
Volkswagen Motorsport UK (SBG Sport)	Volkswagen	Golf GTI Kit Car	1	Tapio Laukkanen	All
Vauxhall Motorsport (RML)	Vauxhall	Astra Kit Car	2	Mark Higgins	All
Vauxhall Motorsport (RML)	Vauxhall	Astra Kit Car	3	Neil Wearden	All
Hyundai Motor Company (Rallycorp)	Hyundai	Coupe Kit Car Evo 2	4	Jarmo Kytolehto	All
Hyundai Motor Company (Rallycorp)	Hyundai	Coupe Kit Car Evo 2	7	Andrew Pinker	All
Peugeot Sport UK	Peugeot	106 GTI	5	Justin Dale	All
Peugeot Sport UK	Peugeot	106 GTI	6	David Higgins	All
Proton Motorsport Harry Hockly Motorsport	Proton	Satria	8	Mats Andersson	All
Lehtonen Motorsport	Volkswagen	Golf GTI Kit Car	9	Jani Pirtinnen	All
DGM Sport	Mitsubishi	Lancer Evolution 6	10	Neil Simpson	All
Polar Motorsport	Mitsubishi	Lancer Evolution 6	11	Marko Ipatti	All
Polar Motorsport	Mitsubishi	Lancer Evolution 6	27	Natalie Barratt	All
Ford Rallye Sport	Ford	Puma Kit Car	12	Juuso Pykalisto	1–2
Ford Rallye Sport	Ford	Puma Kit Car	15	Martin Rowe	4
Ford Rallye Sport	Ford	Puma Kit Car	41	Ben Briant	3–5
Flex-Seal Motorsport	Mitsubishi	Lancer Evolution 6	12	Gavin Cox	All
ADR Motorsport	Mitsubishi	Lancer Evolution 5	14	Guy Anderson	2–6
Jonny Milner	Toyota	Celica GT Four	15	Jonny Milner	All
Asquith Motorsport	Citroen	Saxo Kit Car	15	Niall McShea	All
Dave Wood	Subaru	Impreza WRX	16	Dave Wood	All
Mike Brown	Mitsubishi	Lancer Evolution 6	19	Mike Brown	All
Quick Motorsport	Mitsubishi	Lancer Evolution 5	21	Nik Elsmore	All
Alistair Ginley	Subaru	Impreza WRX	22	Alistair Ginley	All
Julian Reynolds	Toyota	Celica GT Four	54	Julian Reynolds	All
Charlie Jukes	Proton	Satria	39	Charlie Jukes	All

Drivers Championship

Pos	Driver	R1	R2	R3	R4	R5	R6	Pts
1	Marko Ipatti	8	12	10	5	10	0	45
2	Mark Higgins	12	-	8	12	-	12	44
3	Neil Wearden	10	-	5	8	12	-	35
4	Tapio Laukkanen	-	-	12	10	8	-	30
5	Justin Dale	-	7	4	-	7	10	28
6	Mats Andersson	7	8	-	-	3	8	26
7	Jarmo Kytolehto	-	10	7	7	-	-	24
8	Andrew Pinker	6	4	1	4	-	-	15
9	Charlie Jukes	5	-	-	2	3	1	11
10	David Higgins	-	5	-	-	5	-	10

Manufacturers Championship

Pos	Entrant	R1	R2	R3	R4	R5	R6	Pts
1	Vauxhall	12	0	10	12	12	12	58
2	Proton	10	10	6	0	7	8	41
3	Peugeot	0	8	7	7	8	10	40
4	Hyundai	8	12	8	8	0	0	36
5	Volkswagen	0	0	12	10	10	0	32

Super 1600 Drivers championship

Pos	Driver	R1	R2	R3	R4	R5	R6	Pts
1	Mats Andersson	12	12	8	-	6	10	48
2	Justin Dale	-	10	12	-	12	12	46
3	Charlie Jukes	10	6	6	10	7	-	39
4	Ben Briant	8	-	5	7	4	-	24
5	David Higgins	-	8	-	6	8	-	22

Group N Drivers Championship

Pos	Driver	R1	R2	R3	R4	R5	R6	Pts
1	Gavin Cox	8	8	12	(7)	8	10	46
2	Dave Wood	5	12	10	8	7	0	42
3	Guy Anderson	3	7	8	10	12	0	40
=	Mike Brown	12	5	6	0	10	7	40
5	Nik Elsmore	7	10	7	4	(2)	8	36
6	Neil Simpson	0	6	0	12	0	12	30
7	Alistair Ginley	0	3	4	5	4	6	22
