= 2003 Cyprus Rally =

7th round of the 2003 World Rally Championship

2003 Cyprus Rally 31st Cyprus Rally
Round 7 of the 2003 World Rally Championship season
← Previous event	Next event →
- Host country: Cyprus
- Rally base: Limassol
- Dates run: June 20, 2003 – June 22, 2003
- Stages: 18 (341.05 km; 211.92 miles)
- Stage surface: Gravel
- Overall distance: 1,184.53 km (736.03 miles)

Statistics
- Crews: 51 at start, 17 at finish

Overall results
- Overall winner: (Norway) Petter Solberg (United Kingdom) Phil Mills (Japan) 555 Subaru World Rally Team; Subaru Impreza S9 WRC '03

The 2003 Cyprus Rally (formally the 31st Cyprus Rally) was the seventh round of the 2003 World Rally Championship. The race was held over three days between 20 June and 22 June 2003, and was based in Limassol, Cyprus. Subaru's Petter Solberg won the race, his 2nd win in the World Rally Championship.

== Background ==
=== Entry list ===
No.	Driver	Co-Driver	Entrant	Car	Tyre
World Rally Championship manufacturer entries
1	(Finland) Marcus Grönholm	(Finland) Timo Rautiainen	(France) Marlboro Peugeot Total	Peugeot 206 WRC	MI
2	(United Kingdom) Richard Burns	(United Kingdom) Robert Reid	(France) Marlboro Peugeot Total	Peugeot 206 WRC	MI
3	(Finland) Harri Rovanperä	(Finland) Risto Pietiläinen	(France) Marlboro Peugeot Total	Peugeot 206 WRC	MI
4	(Estonia) Markko Märtin	(United Kingdom) Michael Park	(United Kingdom) Ford Motor Co. Ltd.	Ford Focus RS WRC '03	MI
5	(Belgium) François Duval	(Belgium) Stéphane Prévot	(United Kingdom) Ford Motor Co. Ltd.	Ford Focus RS WRC '03	MI
6	(Finland) Mikko Hirvonen	(Finland) Jarmo Lehtinen	(United Kingdom) Ford Motor Co. Ltd.	Ford Focus RS WRC '02	MI
7	(Norway) Petter Solberg	(United Kingdom) Phil Mills	(Japan) 555 Subaru World Rally Team	Subaru Impreza S9 WRC '03	P
8	(Finland) Tommi Mäkinen	(Finland) Kaj Lindström	(Japan) 555 Subaru World Rally Team	Subaru Impreza S9 WRC '03	P
10	(Germany) Armin Schwarz	(Germany) Manfred Hiemer	(South Korea) Hyundai World Rally Team	Hyundai Accent WRC3	MI
11	(Belgium) Freddy Loix	(Belgium) Sven Smeets	(South Korea) Hyundai World Rally Team	Hyundai Accent WRC3	MI
12	(United Kingdom) Justin Dale	(United Kingdom) Andrew Bargery	(South Korea) Hyundai World Rally Team	Hyundai Accent WRC3	MI
14	(France) Didier Auriol	(France) Denis Giraudet	(Czech Republic) Škoda Motorsport	Škoda Octavia WRC Evo3	MI
15	(Finland) Toni Gardemeister	(Finland) Paavo Lukander	(Czech Republic) Škoda Motorsport	Škoda Octavia WRC Evo3	MI
17	(United Kingdom) Colin McRae	(United Kingdom) Derek Ringer	(France) Citroën Total WRT	Citroën Xsara WRC	MI
18	(France) Sébastien Loeb	(Monaco) Daniel Elena	(France) Citroën Total WRT	Citroën Xsara WRC	MI
19	(Spain) Carlos Sainz	(Spain) Marc Martí	(France) Citroën Total WRT	Citroën Xsara WRC	MI
World Rally Championship entries
20	(France) Gilles Panizzi	(France) Hervé Panizzi	(France) Bozian Racing	Peugeot 206 WRC	MI
21	(Germany) Antony Warmbold	(United Kingdom) Gemma Price	(Germany) AW Rally Team	Ford Focus RS WRC '02	MI
22	(Finland) Juuso Pykälistö	(Finland) Esko Mertsalmi	(France) Bozian Racing	Peugeot 206 WRC	MI
32	(United Kingdom) Alistair Ginley	(Republic of Ireland) Rory Kennedy	(United Kingdom) Alistair Ginley	Ford Focus RS WRC '01	—N/a
100	(Cyprus) Andreas Tsouloftas	(Cyprus) Panayiotis Shialos	(Cyprus) Andreas Tsouloftas	Mitsubishi Lancer Evo VI	—N/a
101	(Italy) Giovanni Recordati	(Monaco) Freddy Delorme	(Italy) Giovanni Recordati	Toyota Corolla WRC	—N/a
PWRC entries
51	(Malaysia) Karamjit Singh	(Malaysia) Allen Oh	(Malaysia) Petronas EON Racing Team	Proton Pert	—N/a
52	(Spain) Daniel Solà	(Spain) Álex Romaní	(Italy) Mauro Rally Tuning	Mitsubishi Lancer Evo VII	P
53	(Peru) Ramón Ferreyros	(Mexico) Javier Marín	(Italy) Mauro Rally Tuning	Mitsubishi Lancer Evo VI	—N/a
54	(Japan) Toshihiro Arai	(New Zealand) Tony Sircombe	(Japan) Subaru Production Rally Team	Subaru Impreza WRX STI N10	P
55	(United Kingdom) Martin Rowe	(United Kingdom) Trevor Agnew	(United Kingdom) David Sutton Cars Ltd	Subaru Impreza WRX STI N10	P
57	(Italy) Giovanni Manfrinato	(Italy) Claudio Condotta	(Italy) Top Run SRL	Mitsubishi Lancer Evo VII	P
58	(Argentina) Marcos Ligato	(Argentina) Rubén García	(Italy) Top Run SRL	Mitsubishi Lancer Evo VII	P
59	(Italy) Stefano Marrini	(Italy) Massimo Agostinelli	(Italy) Top Run SRL	Mitsubishi Lancer Evo VI	—N/a
60	(United Kingdom) Niall McShea	(United Kingdom) Chris Patterson	(New Zealand) Neil Allport Motorsports	Mitsubishi Lancer Evo VI	MI
61	(Poland) Janusz Kulig	(Poland) Dariusz Burkat	Mobil 1 Team Poland	Mitsubishi Lancer Evo VII	MI
64	(Sweden) Joakim Roman	(Sweden) Ingrid Mitakidou	(Sweden) Milbrooks World Rally Team	Mitsubishi Lancer Evo V	—N/a
65	(Sweden) Stig Blomqvist	(Venezuela) Ana Goñi	(United Kingdom) David Sutton Cars Ltd	Subaru Impreza WRX STI N10	—N/a
69	(Belgium) Bob Colsoul	(Belgium) Tom Colsoul	(Belgium) Guy Colsoul Rallysport	Mitsubishi Lancer Evo VI	—N/a
70	(Italy) Riccardo Errani	(Italy) Stefano Casadio	(Italy) Errani Team Group	Mitsubishi Lancer Evo VI	—N/a
71	(Bulgaria) Georgi Geradzhiev Jr.	(Bulgaria) Nikola Popov	(Bulgaria) Racing Team Bulgartabac	Mitsubishi Lancer Evo VI	—N/a
72	(Romania) Constantin Aur	(Romania) Adrian Berghea	(Austria) Stohl Racing	Mitsubishi Lancer Evo VII	—N/a
74	(Italy) Fabio Frisiero	(Italy) Giovanni Agnese	(Italy) Motoring Club	Mitsubishi Lancer Evo VII	—N/a
76	(Canada) Patrick Richard	(Sweden) Mikael Johansson	Subaru Rally Team Canada	Subaru Impreza WRX	—N/a
77	(Italy) Alfredo De Dominicis	(Italy) Giovanni Bernacchini	Ralliart Italy	Mitsubishi Lancer Evo VI	—N/a
80	(Mexico) Ricardo Triviño	(Spain) Jordi Barrabés	(Mexico) Triviño Racing	Mitsubishi Lancer Evo VII	—N/a

=== Itinerary ===
All dates and times are EEST (UTC+3).

Date	Time	No.	Stage name	Distance
Leg 1 — 99.84 km
20 June	08:48	SS1	Platres — Kato Amiantos 1	11.60 km
20 June	09:41	SS2	Lagoudera — Spilia 1	38.32 km
20 June	14:39	SS3	Platres — Kato Amiantos 2	11.60 km
20 June	15:32	SS4	Lagoudera — Spilia 2	38.32 km
Leg 2 — 158.35 km
21 June	07:43	SS5	Kourdali — Asinou	15.00 km
21 June	08:13	SS6	Asinou — Nikitari	25.61 km
21 June	09:13	SS7	Orkondas — Stavroulia	17.99 km
21 June	11:33	SS8	Akrounda — Apsiou	7.99 km
21 June	12:36	SS9	Foini — Koilinia 1	30.33 km
21 June	13:34	SS10	Galatareia — Nata 1	15.55 km
21 June	16:27	SS11	Foini — Koilinia 2	30.33 km
21 June	17:25	SS12	Galatareia — Nata 2	15.55 km
Leg 3 — 82.86 km
22 June	08:53	SS13	Vavatsinia — Mandra Kambiou 1	19.00 km
22 June	09:36	SS14	Macheras — Agioi Vavatsinias 1	12.94 km
22 June	10:19	SS15	Kellaki — Foinikaria 1	9.49 km
22 June	12:37	SS16	Vavatsinia — Mandra Kambiou 2	19.00 km
22 June	13:20	SS17	Macheras — Agioi Vavatsinias 2	12.94 km
22 June	14:03	SS18	Kellaki — Foinikaria 2	9.49 km

== Results ==
=== Overall ===
Pos.	No.	Driver	Co-driver	Team	Car	Time	Difference	Points
1	7	(Norway) Petter Solberg	(United Kingdom) Phil Mills	(Japan) 555 Subaru World Rally Team	Subaru Impreza S9 WRC '03	5:09:12.6		10
2	3	(Finland) Harri Rovanperä	(Finland) Risto Pietiläinen	(France) Marlboro Peugeot Total	Peugeot 206 WRC	5:13:26.6	+4:14.0	8
3	18	(France) Sébastien Loeb	(Monaco) Daniel Elena	(France) Citroën Total WRT	Citroën Xsara WRC	5:13:29.4	+4:16.8	6
4	17	(United Kingdom) Colin McRae	(United Kingdom) Derek Ringer	(France) Citroën Total WRT	Citroën Xsara WRC	5:13:57.9	+4:45.3	5
5	19	(Spain) Carlos Sainz	(Spain) Marc Martí	(France) Citroën Total WRT	Citroën Xsara WRC	5:14:54.8	+5:42.2	4
6	6	(Finland) Mikko Hirvonen	(Finland) Jarmo Lehtinen	(United Kingdom) Ford Motor Co. Ltd.	Ford Focus RS WRC '02	5:18:11.3	+8:58.7	3
7	10	(Germany) Armin Schwarz	(Germany) Manfred Hiemer	(South Korea) Hyundai World Rally Team	Hyundai Accent WRC3	5:22:41.6	+13:29.0	2
8	32	(United Kingdom) Alistair Ginley	(Republic of Ireland) Rory Kennedy	(United Kingdom) Alistair Ginley	Ford Focus RS WRC '01	5:33:09.9	+23:57.3	1

=== World Rally Cars ===
==== Classification ====
Position		No.	Driver	Co-driver	Entrant	Car	Time	Difference	Points
Event	Class	No.	Driver	Co-driver	Entrant	Car	Time	Difference	Points
1	1	7	(Norway) Petter Solberg	(United Kingdom) Phil Mills	(Japan) 555 Subaru World Rally Team	Subaru Impreza S9 WRC '03	5:09:12.6		10
2	2	3	(Finland) Harri Rovanperä	(Finland) Risto Pietiläinen	(France) Marlboro Peugeot Total	Peugeot 206 WRC	5:13:26.6	+4:14.0	8
3	3	18	(France) Sébastien Loeb	(Monaco) Daniel Elena	(France) Citroën Total WRT	Citroën Xsara WRC	5:13:29.4	+4:16.8	6
4	4	17	(United Kingdom) Colin McRae	(United Kingdom) Derek Ringer	(France) Citroën Total WRT	Citroën Xsara WRC	5:13:57.9	+4:45.3	5
5	5	19	(Spain) Carlos Sainz	(Spain) Marc Martí	(France) Citroën Total WRT	Citroën Xsara WRC	5:14:54.8	+5:42.2	4
6	6	6	(Finland) Mikko Hirvonen	(Finland) Jarmo Lehtinen	(United Kingdom) Ford Motor Co. Ltd.	Ford Focus RS WRC '02	5:18:11.3	+8:58.7	3
7	7	10	(Germany) Armin Schwarz	(Germany) Manfred Hiemer	(South Korea) Hyundai World Rally Team	Hyundai Accent WRC3	5:22:41.6	+13:29.0	2
Retired SS11		2	(United Kingdom) Richard Burns	(United Kingdom) Robert Reid	(France) Marlboro Peugeot Total	Peugeot 206 WRC	Engine		0
Retired SS11		8	(Finland) Tommi Mäkinen	(Finland) Kaj Lindström	(Japan) 555 Subaru World Rally Team	Subaru Impreza S9 WRC '03	Over time limit		0
Retired SS11		14	(France) Didier Auriol	(France) Denis Giraudet	(Czech Republic) Škoda Motorsport	Škoda Octavia WRC Evo3	Alternator		0
Retired SS9		15	(Finland) Toni Gardemeister	(Finland) Paavo Lukander	(Czech Republic) Škoda Motorsport	Škoda Octavia WRC Evo3	Accident		0
Retired SS6		1	(Finland) Marcus Grönholm	(Finland) Timo Rautiainen	(France) Marlboro Peugeot Total	Peugeot 206 WRC	Propshaft		0
Retired SS6		11	(Belgium) Freddy Loix	(Belgium) Sven Smeets	(South Korea) Hyundai World Rally Team	Hyundai Accent WRC3	Engine		0
Retired SS5		4	(Estonia) Markko Märtin	(United Kingdom) Michael Park	(United Kingdom) Ford Motor Co. Ltd.	Ford Focus RS WRC '03	Oil pressure		0
Retired SS5		5	(Belgium) François Duval	(Belgium) Stéphane Prévot	(United Kingdom) Ford Motor Co. Ltd.	Ford Focus RS WRC '03	Oil pressure		0
Retired SS3		12	(United Kingdom) Justin Dale	(United Kingdom) Andrew Bargery	(South Korea) Hyundai World Rally Team	Hyundai Accent WRC3	Engine		0

==== Special stages ====
Day	Stage	Stage name	Length	Winner	Car	Time	Class leaders
Leg 1 (20 June)	SS1	Platres — Kato Amiantos 1	11.60 km	(Finland) Harri Rovanperä	Peugeot 206 WRC	9:27.1	(Finland) Harri Rovanperä
Leg 1 (20 June)	SS2	Lagoudera — Spilia 1	38.32 km	(Finland) Harri Rovanperä	Peugeot 206 WRC	35:18.4	(Finland) Harri Rovanperä
Leg 1 (20 June)	SS3	Platres — Kato Amiantos 2	11.60 km	(Finland) Harri Rovanperä	Peugeot 206 WRC	9:12.4	(Finland) Harri Rovanperä
Leg 1 (20 June)	SS4	Lagoudera — Spilia 2	38.32 km	(Finland) Marcus Grönholm	Peugeot 206 WRC	34:30.3	(Finland) Marcus Grönholm
Leg 2 (21 June)	SS5	Kourdali — Asinou	15.00 km	(Finland) Tommi Mäkinen	Subaru Impreza S9 WRC '03	15:48.5	(Norway) Petter Solberg
Leg 2 (21 June)	SS6	Asinou — Nikitari	25.61 km	(Norway) Petter Solberg	Subaru Impreza S9 WRC '03	26:28.3	(Norway) Petter Solberg
Leg 2 (21 June)	SS7	Orkondas — Stavroulia	17.99 km	(Finland) Tommi Mäkinen	Subaru Impreza S9 WRC '03	19:02.7	(Norway) Petter Solberg
Leg 2 (21 June)	SS8	Akrounda — Apsiou	7.99 km	(Finland) Tommi Mäkinen	Subaru Impreza S9 WRC '03	8:01.4	(Norway) Petter Solberg
Leg 2 (21 June)	SS9	Foini — Koilinia 1	30.33 km	(Finland) Harri Rovanperä	Peugeot 206 WRC	27:23.4	(Norway) Petter Solberg
Leg 2 (21 June)	SS10	Galatareia — Nata 1	15.55 km	(Finland) Tommi Mäkinen	Subaru Impreza S9 WRC '03	11:14.7	(Norway) Petter Solberg
Leg 2 (21 June)	SS11	Foini — Koilinia 2	30.33 km	(Finland) Harri Rovanperä	Peugeot 206 WRC	26:54.4	(Norway) Petter Solberg
Leg 2 (21 June)	SS12	Galatareia — Nata 2	15.55 km	(Norway) Petter Solberg	Subaru Impreza S9 WRC '03	10:58.6	(Norway) Petter Solberg
Leg 3 (22 June)	SS13	Vavatsinia — Mandra Kambiou 1	19.00 km	(Norway) Petter Solberg	Subaru Impreza S9 WRC '03	17:00.3	(Norway) Petter Solberg
Leg 3 (22 June)	SS14	Macheras — Agioi Vavatsinias 1	12.94 km	(Norway) Petter Solberg	Subaru Impreza S9 WRC '03	11:26.5	(Norway) Petter Solberg
Leg 3 (22 June)	SS15	Kellaki — Foinikaria 1	9.49 km	(Norway) Petter Solberg	Subaru Impreza S9 WRC '03	8:29.2	(Norway) Petter Solberg
Leg 3 (22 June)	SS16	Vavatsinia — Mandra Kambiou 2	19.00 km	(Norway) Petter Solberg	Subaru Impreza S9 WRC '03	16:45.3	(Norway) Petter Solberg
Leg 3 (22 June)	SS17	Macheras — Agioi Vavatsinias 2	12.94 km	(Spain) Carlos Sainz	Citroën Xsara WRC	11:32.8	(Norway) Petter Solberg
Leg 3 (22 June)	SS18	Kellaki — Foinikaria 2	9.49 km	(Norway) Petter Solberg	Subaru Impreza S9 WRC '03	8:28.7	(Norway) Petter Solberg

==== Championship standings ====
Pos.	Drivers' championships			Co-drivers' championships			Manufacturers' championships		
Pos.	Move	Driver	Points	Move	Co-driver	Points	Move	Manufacturer	Points
1		(United Kingdom) Richard Burns	37		(United Kingdom) Robert Reid	37		(France) Marlboro Peugeot Total	81
2		(Spain) Carlos Sainz	36		(Spain) Marc Martí	36		(France) Citroën Total WRT	73
3		(Finland) Marcus Grönholm	30		(Finland) Timo Rautiainen	30	1	(Japan) 555 Subaru World Rally Team	47
4	1	(Norway) Petter Solberg	29	1	(United Kingdom) Phil Mills	29	1	(United Kingdom) Ford Motor Co. Ltd.	43
5	2	(France) Sébastien Loeb	23	2	(Monaco) Daniel Elena	23		(Czech Republic) Škoda Motorsport	20

=== Production World Rally Championship ===
==== Classification ====
Position		No.	Driver	Co-driver	Entrant	Car	Time	Difference	Points
Event	Class	No.	Driver	Co-driver	Entrant	Car	Time	Difference	Points
9	1	54	(Japan) Toshihiro Arai	(New Zealand) Tony Sircombe	(Japan) Subaru Production Rally Team	Subaru Impreza WRX STI N10	5:39:13.7		10
10	2	55	(United Kingdom) Martin Rowe	(United Kingdom) Trevor Agnew	(United Kingdom) David Sutton Cars Ltd	Subaru Impreza WRX STI N10	5:42:56.7	+3:43.0	8
11	3	65	(Sweden) Stig Blomqvist	(Venezuela) Ana Goñi	(United Kingdom) David Sutton Cars Ltd	Subaru Impreza WRX STI N10	5:45:30.1	+6:16.4	6
12	4	58	(Argentina) Marcos Ligato	(Argentina) Rubén García	(Italy) Top Run SRL	Mitsubishi Lancer Evo VII	6:00:26.8	+21:13.1	5
14	5	69	(Belgium) Bob Colsoul	(Belgium) Tom Colsoul	(Belgium) Guy Colsoul Rallysport	Mitsubishi Lancer Evo VI	6:10:50.7	+31:37.0	4
17	6	70	(Italy) Riccardo Errani	(Italy) Stefano Casadio	(Italy) Errani Team Group	Mitsubishi Lancer Evo VI	6:46:12.8	+1:06:59.1	3
Retired SS13		61	(Poland) Janusz Kulig	(Poland) Dariusz Burkat	Mobil 1 Team Poland	Mitsubishi Lancer Evo VII	Accident		0
Retired SS11		71	(Bulgaria) Georgi Geradzhiev Jr.	(Bulgaria) Nikola Popov	(Bulgaria) Racing Team Bulgartabac	Mitsubishi Lancer Evo VI	Electronics		0
Retired SS9		51	(Malaysia) Karamjit Singh	(Malaysia) Allen Oh	(Malaysia) Petronas EON Racing Team	Proton Pert	Mechanical		0
Retired SS9		52	(Spain) Daniel Solà	(Spain) Álex Romaní	(Italy) Mauro Rally Tuning	Mitsubishi Lancer Evo VII	Mechanical		0
Retired SS9		72	(Romania) Constantin Aur	(Romania) Adrian Berghea	(Austria) Stohl Racing	Mitsubishi Lancer Evo VII	Mechanical		0
Retired SS9		80	(Mexico) Ricardo Triviño	(Spain) Jordi Barrabés	(Mexico) Triviño Racing	Mitsubishi Lancer Evo VII	Mechanical		0
Retired SS8		74	(Italy) Fabio Frisiero	(Italy) Giovanni Agnese	(Italy) Motoring Club	Mitsubishi Lancer Evo VII	Mechanical		0
Retired SS6		60	(United Kingdom) Niall McShea	(United Kingdom) Chris Patterson	(New Zealand) Neil Allport Motorsports	Mitsubishi Lancer Evo VI	Mechanical		0
Retired SS6		64	(Sweden) Joakim Roman	(Sweden) Ingrid Mitakidou	(Sweden) Milbrooks World Rally Team	Mitsubishi Lancer Evo V	Accident		0
Retired SS3		53	(Peru) Ramón Ferreyros	(Mexico) Javier Marín	(Italy) Mauro Rally Tuning	Mitsubishi Lancer Evo VI	Mechanical		0
Retired SS2		57	(Italy) Giovanni Manfrinato	(Italy) Claudio Condotta	(Italy) Top Run SRL	Mitsubishi Lancer Evo VII	Mechanical		0
Retired SS2		76	(Canada) Patrick Richard	(Sweden) Mikael Johansson	Subaru Rally Team Canada	Subaru Impreza WRX	Mechanical		0
Retired SS2		77	(Italy) Alfredo De Dominicis	(Italy) Giovanni Bernacchini	Ralliart Italy	Mitsubishi Lancer Evo VI	Mechanical		0
Retired SS1		59	(Italy) Stefano Marrini	(Italy) Massimo Agostinelli	(Italy) Top Run SRL	Mitsubishi Lancer Evo VI	Mechanical		0

==== Special stages ====
Day	Stage	Stage name	Length	Winner	Car	Time	Class leaders
Leg 1 (20 June)	SS1	Platres — Kato Amiantos 1	11.60 km	(Japan) Toshihiro Arai	Subaru Impreza WRX STI N10	9:58.0	(Japan) Toshihiro Arai
Leg 1 (20 June)	SS2	Lagoudera — Spilia 1	38.32 km	(Japan) Toshihiro Arai	Subaru Impreza WRX STI N10	38:11.4	(Japan) Toshihiro Arai
Leg 1 (20 June)	SS3	Platres — Kato Amiantos 2	11.60 km	(Japan) Toshihiro Arai	Subaru Impreza WRX STI N10	9:51.7	(Japan) Toshihiro Arai
Leg 1 (20 June)	SS4	Lagoudera — Spilia 2	38.32 km	(Poland) Janusz Kulig	Mitsubishi Lancer Evo VII	39:13.7	(Japan) Toshihiro Arai
Leg 2 (21 June)	SS5	Kourdali — Asinou	15.00 km	(Argentina) Marcos Ligato	Mitsubishi Lancer Evo VII	17:13.1	(Japan) Toshihiro Arai
Leg 2 (21 June)	SS6	Asinou — Nikitari	25.61 km	(Spain) Daniel Solà	Mitsubishi Lancer Evo VII	28:30.3	(Japan) Toshihiro Arai
Leg 2 (21 June)	SS7	Orkondas — Stavroulia	17.99 km	(Argentina) Marcos Ligato	Mitsubishi Lancer Evo VII	20:33.4	(Japan) Toshihiro Arai
Leg 2 (21 June)	SS8	Akrounda — Apsiou	7.99 km	(Argentina) Marcos Ligato	Mitsubishi Lancer Evo VII	8:32.7	(Japan) Toshihiro Arai
Leg 2 (21 June)	SS9	Foini — Koilinia 1	30.33 km	(Argentina) Marcos Ligato	Mitsubishi Lancer Evo VII	29:36.7	(Japan) Toshihiro Arai
Leg 2 (21 June)	SS10	Galatareia — Nata 1	15.55 km	(Argentina) Marcos Ligato	Mitsubishi Lancer Evo VII	12:30.3	(Japan) Toshihiro Arai
Leg 2 (21 June)	SS11	Foini — Koilinia 2	30.33 km	(Argentina) Marcos Ligato	Mitsubishi Lancer Evo VII	29:25.2	(Japan) Toshihiro Arai
Leg 2 (21 June)	SS12	Galatareia — Nata 2	15.55 km	(Argentina) Marcos Ligato	Mitsubishi Lancer Evo VII	12:27.2	(Japan) Toshihiro Arai
Leg 3 (22 June)	SS13	Vavatsinia — Mandra Kambiou 1	19.00 km	(Argentina) Marcos Ligato	Mitsubishi Lancer Evo VII	18:18.5	(Japan) Toshihiro Arai
Leg 3 (22 June)	SS14	Macheras — Agioi Vavatsinias 1	12.94 km	(Japan) Toshihiro Arai	Subaru Impreza WRX STI N10	12:36.7	(Japan) Toshihiro Arai
Leg 3 (22 June)	SS15	Kellaki — Foinikaria 1	9.49 km	(Japan) Toshihiro Arai	Subaru Impreza WRX STI N10	9:11.7	(Japan) Toshihiro Arai
Leg 3 (22 June)	SS16	Vavatsinia — Mandra Kambiou 2	19.00 km	(Japan) Toshihiro Arai	Subaru Impreza WRX STI N10	18:30.6	(Japan) Toshihiro Arai
Leg 3 (22 June)	SS17	Macheras — Agioi Vavatsinias 2	12.94 km	(Japan) Toshihiro Arai	Subaru Impreza WRX STI N10	12:50.3	(Japan) Toshihiro Arai
Leg 3 (22 June)	SS18	Kellaki — Foinikaria 2	9.49 km	(Japan) Toshihiro Arai	Subaru Impreza WRX STI N10	9:08.1	(Japan) Toshihiro Arai

==== Championship standings ====
Pos.	Drivers' championships		
Pos.	Move	Driver	Points
1		(Japan) Toshihiro Arai	30
2	2	(United Kingdom) Martin Rowe	19
3		(Sweden) Stig Blomqvist	17
4	2	(Malaysia) Karamjit Singh	17
5		(Argentina) Marcos Ligato	13
