= Daniel Elena =

Monégasque rally co-driver (born 1972)

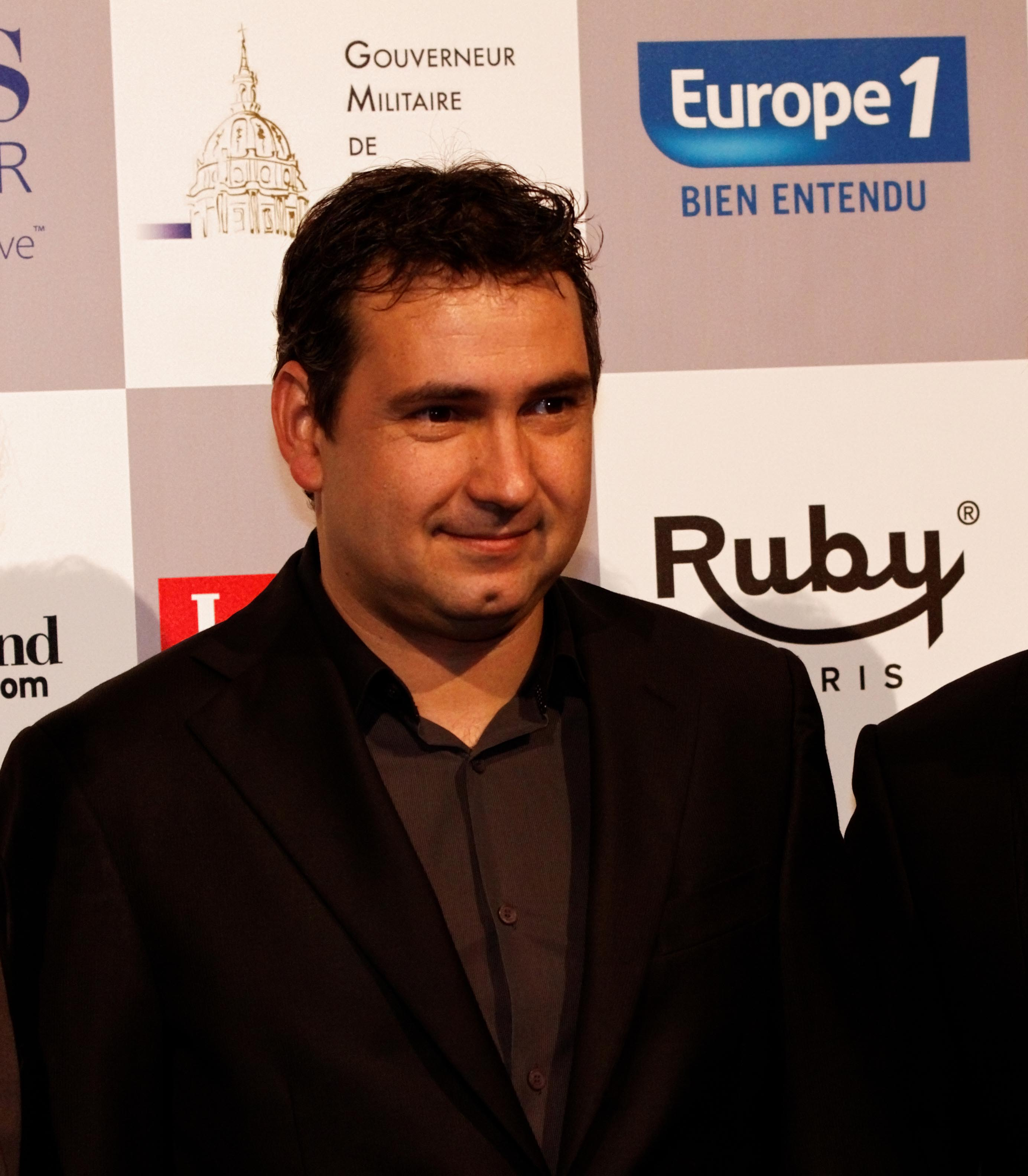
- Elena in 2012.

Personal information
- Nationality: Monégasque
- Born: 26 October 1972 (age 54)

World Rally Championship record
- Years active: 1998–2013, 2015, 2018–2020
- Driver: (France) Sébastien Loeb
- Teams: Citroën, Kronos Citroën, Hyundai
- Rallies: 181 (Note: Elena has started 180 events as a co-driver and one as a driver.)
- Co-championships: 9 (2004, 2005, 2006, 2007, 2008, 2009, 2010, 2011, 2012)
- Rally wins: 79
- Podiums: 118
- Stage wins: 925
- First rally: 1998 Monte Carlo Rally
- First win: 2002 Rallye Deutschland
- Last win: 2018 Rally Catalunya
- Last rally: 2020 Rally Turkey

Daniel Elena (born 26 October 1972) also known as "Danos" is a Monégasque rally co-driver working most notably with Sébastien Loeb. Between them the pair have won the World Rally Championship (WRC) nine times with Citroën, later competing with Hyundai. Their 79 wins together make him the co-driver with the most victories in the history of the WRC.

== Career ==
Elena started rallying in 1992 as co-driver to Christophe Bovini but his first 'full season' came in 1996 with Hervé Bernard in the French national championships. In 1998, he became Loeb's co-driver and quickly developed a strong relationship with him, winning every event they finished in the Citroën Saxo Trophy in 1998, then the overall trophy itself in 1999. The following year with Citroën part-backing the duo, they won the two-wheel drive class of the French gravel title.

In 2001, they won both the FIA Super 1600 championship (later J-WRC) in their Citroën Saxo and the French national championship in a Citroën Xsara Kit Car. Becoming an obvious choice for Citroën's WRC team, they made their first start for the manufacturer in the same year, finishing second overall on the 2001 San Remo Rally. A part programme in 2002 included their first win at Rallye Deutschland and in 2003 they became full-time competitors. As team mates to former drivers champions Colin McRae and Carlos Sainz, Loeb and Elena outscored them both finishing the season second overall. They went on to take nine consecutive World Rally Championship titles between 2004 and 2012, before Loeb retired from the series in 2013.

When Loeb came out of WRC retirement in 2018 the pair reunited for Citroën again, running three events and winning Rally Catalunya. Hyundai Motorsport offered Loeb a two-year contract running a few events in 2019 and 2020, and Elena once again was his co-driver.

Between 2016 and 2019, Loeb entered the famous Dakar Rally with Elena by his side behind the wheel of a modified Peugeot 3008, reaching the podium twice. In 2021, the pair entered in a Prodrive built car but had to retire. Two months later, Elena posted on social media that he had effectively been sacked by Loeb at Prodrive's request because of the poor Dakar result. Rally's most successful pairing of all time separated after 23 years of working together.

Elena has also entered a few rallies as a driver, including the Monte-Carlo Rally, though never outside France.

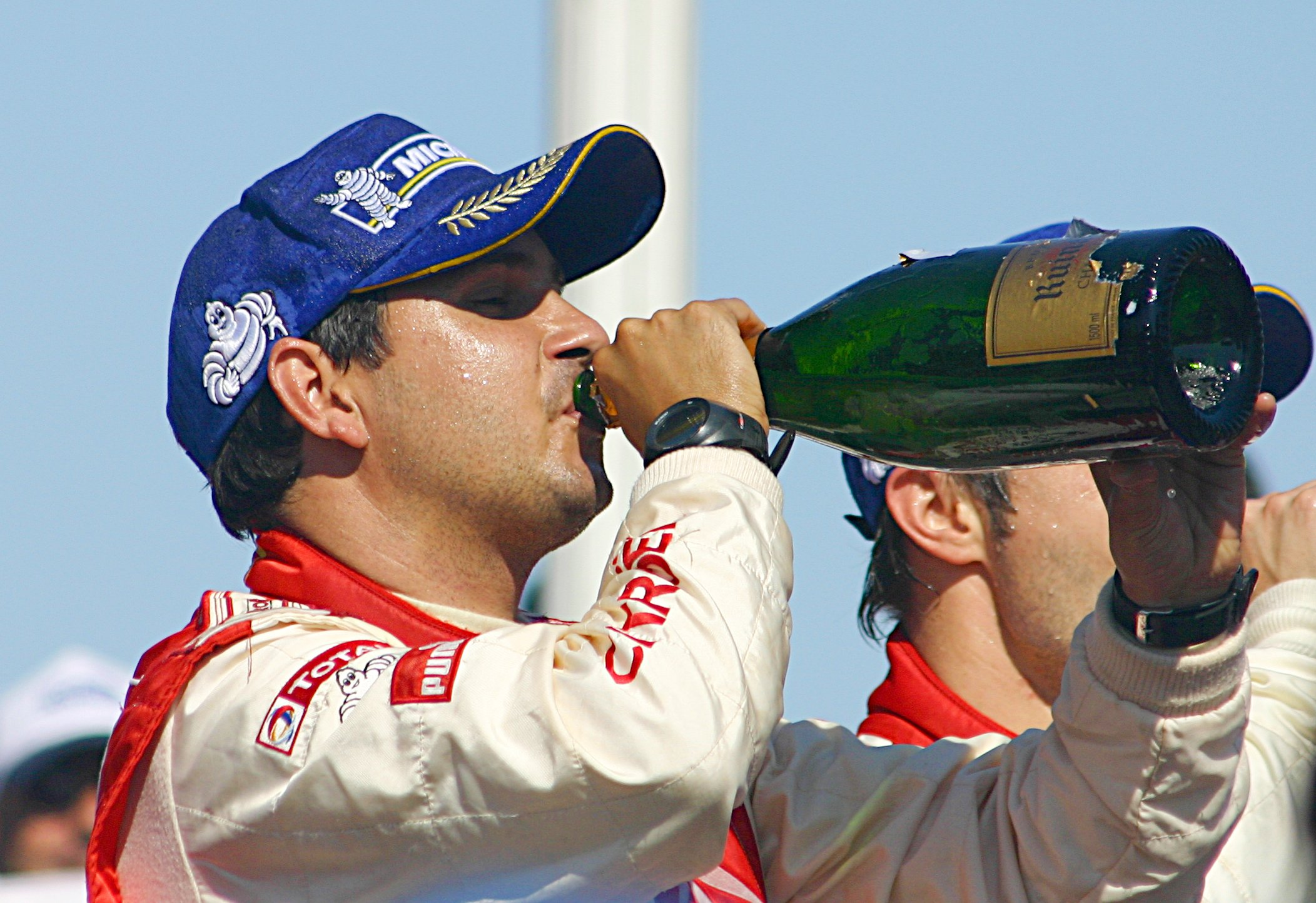
Elena celebrating victory at the 2005 Cyprus Rally.

Loeb and Elena have won Elena's home rally, the famous Monte Carlo Rally seven times (2003–2005, 2007–2008, 2012–2013).

Elena is the first person to have received the Michael Park Trophy, which is now given yearly to the best co-driver.

== Personal life ==
Elena is divorced and has two daughters, Romane and Dorine, with his former wife. He and his new partner, Anaïs Reyne, welcomed a daughter, Joy, on 9 October 2020.

== Commitment ==
Elena is today a member of the ‘Champions for Peace’ club, a group of 54 famous elite athletes committed to serving peace in the world through sport, created by Peace and Sport, a Monaco-based international organization.

== Complete WRC results ==
=== WRC results ===
==== As driver ====
Year	Entrant	Car	1	2	3	4	5	6	7	8	9	10	11	12	13	WDC	Points
1998	Daniel Elena	Peugeot 106 Rallye	MON; 36	SWE	KEN	POR	ESP	FRA	ARG	GRC	NZL	FIN	ITA	AUS	GBR	NC	0

==== As co-driver ====
Year	Entrant	Car	1	2	3	4	5	6	7	8	9	10	11	12	13	14	15	16	WDC	Points
1999	Equipe de France FFSA	Citroën Saxo Kit Car	MON	SWE	KEN	POR	ESP; Ret	FRA; 19	ARG	GRE	NZL	FIN	CHN	ITA; 21	AUS	GBR			NC	0
2000	Sébastien Loeb	Citroën Saxo Kit Car	MON	SWE	KEN	POR	ESP	ARG	GRE	NZL	FIN; Ret	CYP				GBR; 38			NC	0
2000	Equipe de France FFSA	Toyota Corolla WRC											FRA; 9	ITA; 10	AUS				NC	0
2001	Sébastien Loeb	Citroën Saxo Kit Car	MON; 15	SWE; Ret	POR														14th	6
2001	Sébastien Loeb	Citroën Saxo S1600				ESP; 15	ARG	CYP	GRE; 19	KEN	FIN; 28	NZL		FRA; 13	AUS	GBR; 15			14th	6
2001	Automobiles Citroën	Citroën Xsara WRC											ITA; 2						14th	6
2002	Automobiles Citroën	Citroën Xsara WRC	MON; 2	SWE; 17	FRA	ESP; Ret	CYP	ARG	GRE; 7	KEN; 5	FIN; 10	GER; 1	ITA	NZL		GBR; Ret			10th	18
2002	Piedrafita Sport	Citroën Xsara WRC													AUS; 7				10th	18
2003	Citroën Total	Citroën Xsara WRC	MON; 1	SWE; 7	TUR; Ret	NZL; 4	ARG; Ret	GRE; Ret	CYP; 3	GER; 1	FIN; 5	AUS; 2	ITA; 1	FRA; 13	ESP; 2	GBR; 2			2nd	71
2004	Citroën Total	Citroën Xsara WRC	MON; 1	SWE; 1	MEX; Ret	NZL; 4	CYP; 1	GRE; 2	TUR; 1	ARG; 2	FIN; 4	GER; 1	JPN; 2	GBR; 2	ITA; 2	FRA; 2	ESP; Ret	AUS; 1	1st	118
2005	Citroën Total	Citroën Xsara WRC	MON; 1	SWE; Ret	MEX; 4	NZL; 1	ITA; 1	CYP; 1	TUR; 1	GRE; 1	ARG; 1	FIN; 2	GER; 1	GBR; 3	JPN; 2	FRA; 1	ESP; 1	AUS; Ret	1st	127
2006	Kronos Total Citroën WRT	Citroën Xsara WRC	MON; 2	SWE; 2	MEX; 1	ESP; 1	FRA; 1	ARG; 1	ITA; 1	GRE; 2	GER; 1	FIN; 2	JPN; 1	CYP; 1	TUR	AUS	NZL	GBR	1st	112
2007	Citroën Total WRT	Citroën C4 WRC	MON; 1	SWE; 2	NOR; 14	MEX; 1	POR; 1	ARG; 1	ITA; Ret	GRE; 2	FIN; 3	GER; 1	NZL; 2	ESP; 1	FRA; 1	JPN; Ret	IRE; 1	GBR; 3	1st	116
2008	Citroën Total WRT	Citroën C4 WRC	MON; 1	SWE; Ret	MEX; 1	ARG; 1	JOR; 10	ITA; 1	GRE; 1	TUR; 3	FIN; 1	GER; 1	NZL; 1	ESP; 1	FRA; 1	JPN; 3	GBR; 1		1st	122
2009	Citroën Total WRT	Citroën C4 WRC	IRE; 1	NOR; 1	CYP; 1	POR; 1	ARG; 1	ITA; 4	GRE; Ret	POL; 7	FIN; 2	AUS; 2	ESP; 1	GBR; 1					1st	93
2010	Citroën Total WRT	Citroën C4 WRC	SWE; 2	MEX; 1	JOR; 1	TUR; 1	NZL; 3	POR; 2	BUL; 1	FIN; 3	GER; 1	JPN; 5	FRA; 1	ESP; 1	GBR; 1				1st	276
2011	Citroën Total WRT	Citroën DS3 WRC	SWE; 6	MEX; 1	POR; 2	JOR; 3	ITA; 1	ARG; 1	GRE; 2	FIN; 1	GER; 2	AUS; 10	FRA; Ret	ESP; 1	GBR; Ret				1st	222
2012	Citroën Total WRT	Citroën DS3 WRC	MON; 1	SWE; 6	MEX; 1	POR; Ret	ARG; 1	GRE; 1	NZL; 1	FIN; 1	GER; 1	GBR; 2	FRA; 1	ITA; Ret	ESP; 1				1st	270
2013	Citroën Total Abu Dhabi WRT	Citroën DS3 WRC	MON; 1	SWE; 2	MEX	POR	ARG; 1	GRE	ITA	FIN	GER	AUS	FRA; Ret	ESP	GBR				8th	68
2015	Citroën Total Abu Dhabi WRT	Citroën DS3 WRC	MON; 8	SWE	MEX	ARG	POR	ITA	POL	FIN	GER	AUS	FRA	ESP	GBR				18th	6
2018	Citroën Total Abu Dhabi WRT	Citroën C3 WRC	MON	SWE	MEX; 5	FRA; 14	ARG	POR	ITA	FIN	GER	TUR	GBR	ESP; 1	AUS				13th	43
2019	Hyundai Shell Mobis WRT	Hyundai i20 Coupe WRC	MON; 4	SWE; 7	MEX	FRA; 8	ARG	CHL; 3	POR; Ret	ITA	FIN	GER	TUR	GBR	ESP; 4	AUS; C			10th	51
2020	Hyundai Shell Mobis WRT	Hyundai i20 Coupe WRC	MON; 6	SWE	MEX	EST	TUR; 3	ITA	MNZ										10th	24

* Season still in progress.

=== JWRC results ===
Year	Entrant	Car	1	2	3	4	5	6	WDC	Points
2001	Sébastien Loeb	Citroën Saxo Kit Car	ESP; 1	GRE; 1					1st	50
2001	Sébastien Loeb	Citroën Saxo S1600			FIN; 1	ITA	FRA; 1	GBR; 1	1st	50

== Notes ==
Awards and achievements
Preceded by Laure Manaudou; Alain Bernard	French Sportsperson of the Year (with Sébastien Loeb); 2007; 2009	Succeeded by Alain Bernard; Christophe Lemaitre
