= Justin Dale =

British rally driver (born 1971)

Personal information
- Nationality: (United Kingdom) British
- Born: 28 May 1971 (age 55); Winchester, United Kingdom

World Rally Championship record
- Years active: 2002–2006
- Co-driver: (United Kingdom) Andrew Bargery
- Teams: Mitsubishi, Hyundai World Rally Team
- Rallies: 5
- Championships: 0
- Rally wins: 0
- Podiums: 0
- Stage wins: 0
- Total points: 0
- First rally: 2002 Rally of Great Britain
- Last rally: 2006 Wales Rally GB

Justin Dale (born 28 May 1971) is a rally driver and driver trainer from Winchester, Hampshire, England.

Dale started rallying in 1992 at the Peugeot Rally Challenge, driving a Peugeot 205 GTi. In 1996 Dale entered the British Rally Championship with co-driver Andrew Bargery for Peugeot Sport, finishing third overall. He continued to drive for Peugeot in the British Rally Championship through the 2000 season until 2001 when no season was held.

In 2002, Dale competed in the WRC competing in the Rally GB as a Mitsubishi factory driver.

In 2003, Dale competed in three rounds of the World Rally Championship as a driver for the Hyundai World Rally Team. He participated in the Cyprus Rally, Rally Deutschland, and Rally Australia.

== Complete WRC results ==
Year	Entrant	Car	1	2	3	4	5	6	7	8	9	10	11	12	13	14	15	16	WDC	Points
2002	Marlboro Mitsubishi Ralliart	Mitsubishi Lancer WRC2	MON	SWE	FRA	ESP	CYP	ARG	GRE	KEN	FIN	GER	ITA	NZL	AUS	GBR; Ret			NC	0
2003	Hyundai World Rally Team	Hyundai Accent WRC3	MON	SWE	TUR	NZL	ARG	GRE	CYP; Ret	GER; 28	FIN	AUS	ITA	FRA	ESP	GBR			NC	0
2005	Justin Dale	Ford Fiesta	MON	SWE	MEX	NZL	ITA	CYP	TUR	GRE	ARG	FIN	GER	GBR	JPN	FRA	ESP; 36	AUS	NC	0
2006	Justin Dale	Renault Clio RS Ragnotti	MON	SWE	MEX	ESP	FRA	ARG	ITA	GRE	GER	FIN	JPN	CYP	TUR	AUS	NZL	GBR; Ret	NC	0
