= 2003 World Rally Championship =

31st season of the FIA World Rally Championship

Champions
- World Drivers' Champion: Petter Solberg
- World Manufacturers' Champion: Citroën

Seasons
- ← 2002 2004 →

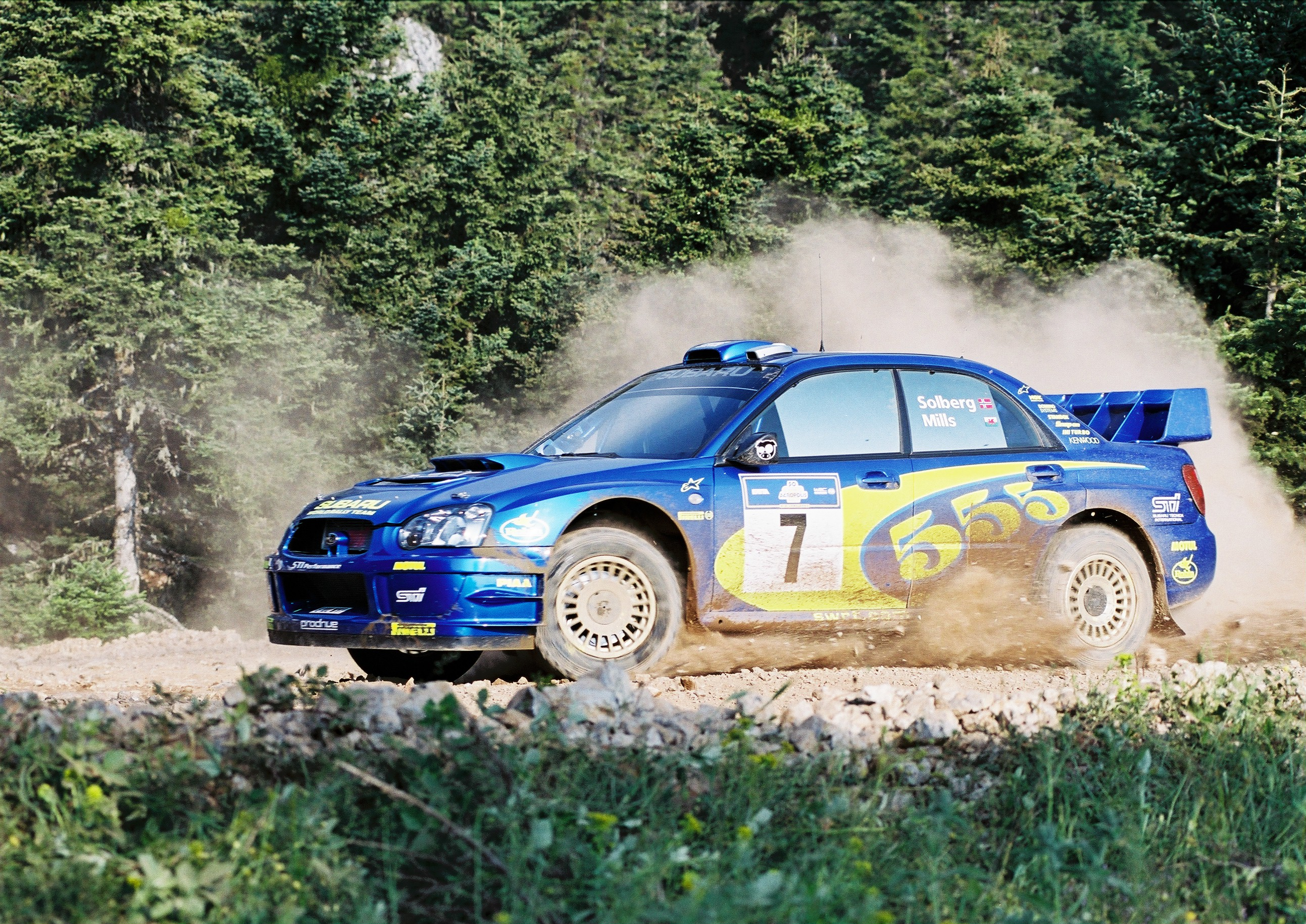
Eventual champion Petter Solberg driving a Subaru Impreza WRC at the 2003 Acropolis Rally.

The 2003 World Rally Championship was the 31st season of the FIA World Rally Championship. The season consisted of 14 rallies. The drivers' world championship was won by Petter Solberg in a Subaru Impreza WRC, ahead of Sébastien Loeb and Carlos Sainz. The manufacturers' title was won by Citroën, ahead of Peugeot and Subaru.

== Calendar ==
The 2003 championship was contested over fourteen rounds in Europe, Asia, South America and Oceania.

Rd.	Start date	Finish date	Rally	Rally headquarters	Surface	Stages	Distance	Support class
1	24 January	26 January	(Monaco) 71st Rallye Automobile Monte Carlo	Monte Carlo	Mixed	14	415.02 km	JWRC
2	7 February	9 February	(Sweden) 52nd Uddeholm Swedish Rally	Karlstad, Värmland County	Snow	17	386.91 km	PWRC
3	27 February	2 March	4th Rally of Turkey	Kemer, Antalya Province	Gravel	18	338.24 km	JWRC
4	10 April	13 April	34th Propecia Rally New Zealand	Manukau, Auckland	Gravel	22	403.34 km	PWRC
5	8 May	11 May	23rd YPF Rally Argentina	Carlos Paz, Córdoba	Gravel	25	402.35 km	PWRC
6	5 June	8 June	(Greece) 50th Golden Acropolis Rally	Lamia, Central Greece	Gravel	22	399.49 km	JWRC
7	20 June	23 June	31st Cyprus Rally	Lemesos, Limassol District	Gravel	18	341.05 km	PWRC
8	25 July	27 July	(Germany) 22nd ADAC Rallye Deutschland	Trier, Rhineland-Palatinate	Tarmac	22	388.23 km	PWRC
9	7 August	10 August	53rd Neste Rally Finland	Jyväskylä, Central Finland	Gravel	23	409.18 km	JWRC
10	4 September	7 September	16th Telstra Rally Australia	Perth, Western Australia	Gravel	24	386.31 km	PWRC
11	3 October	5 October	(Italy) 45th Rallye Sanremo - Rallye d'Italia	Sanremo, Liguria	Tarmac	14	387.36 km	JWRC
12	17 October	19 October	47th Tour de Corse - Rallye de France	Ajaccio, Corsica	Tarmac	16	397.40 km	PWRC
13	24 October	26 October	(Spain) 39th Rally Catalunya - Costa Brava - Rally de España	Lloret de Mar, Catalonia	Tarmac	22	381.18 km	JWRC
14	6 November	9 November	(United Kingdom) 59th Wales Rally GB	Cardiff, Wales	Gravel	18	376.81 km	JWRC

=== Calendar changes ===
The Safari Rally Kenya was dropped from the calendar for 2003 due to missed fee payments from previous WRC seasons and was replace by the Rally of Turkey. After the 2002 Kenyan general election, the new government pushed for the Rally to return to the calendar and was looking at replacing Rally Australia after the event was called into question by FIA President Max Mosley due to organisational and safety issues. Eventually Rally Australia would go ahead and the Safari Rally Kenya would not return to the WRC calendar until 2021.

== Teams and drivers ==
World Rally Car entries eligible to score manufacturer points
Manufacturer	Car	Team	Tyre	No	Drivers	Co-Drivers	Rounds
Peugeot	206 WRC	(France) Marlboro Peugeot Total	M	1	(Finland) Marcus Grönholm	(Finland) Timo Rautiainen	All
Peugeot	206 WRC	(France) Marlboro Peugeot Total	M	2	(United Kingdom) Richard Burns	(United Kingdom) Robert Reid	1-13
Peugeot	206 WRC	(France) Marlboro Peugeot Total	M	2	(Belgium) Freddy Loix	(Belgium) Sven Smeets	14
Peugeot	206 WRC	(France) Marlboro Peugeot Total	M	3	(France) Gilles Panizzi	(France) Hervé Panizzi	1, 8, 11–13
Peugeot	206 WRC	(France) Marlboro Peugeot Total	M	3	(Finland) Harri Rovanperä	(Finland) Risto Pietiläinen	2–7, 9–10, 14
Ford	Focus RS WRC 02 1-3 Focus RS WRC 03 4-14	(United States) Ford Motor Co Ltd	M	4	(Estonia) Markko Märtin	(United Kingdom) Michael Park	1–3
Ford	Focus RS WRC 02 1-3 Focus RS WRC 03 4-14	(United States) Ford Motor Co Ltd	M	4	(Estonia) Markko Märtin	(United Kingdom) Michael Park	4–14
Ford	Focus RS WRC 02 1-3 Focus RS WRC 03 4-14	(United States) Ford Motor Co Ltd	M	5	(Belgium) François Duval	(Belgium) Jean-Marc Fortin	1-2
Ford	Focus RS WRC 02 1-3 Focus RS WRC 03 4-14	(United States) Ford Motor Co Ltd	M	5	(Belgium) François Duval	(Belgium) Stéphane Prévot	3
Ford	Focus RS WRC 02 1-3 Focus RS WRC 03 4-14	(United States) Ford Motor Co Ltd	M	5	(Belgium) François Duval	(Belgium) Stéphane Prévot	4–14
Subaru	Impreza WRC2003	(Japan) 555 Subaru World Rally Team	P	7	(Norway) Petter Solberg	(Wales) Phil Mills	All
Subaru	Impreza WRC2003	(Japan) 555 Subaru World Rally Team	P	8	(Finland) Tommi Mäkinen	(Finland) Kaj Lindström	All
Hyundai	Accent WRC3	(South Korea) Hyundai World Rally Team	M	10	(Germany) Armin Schwarz	(Germany) Manfred Hiemer	1–10
Hyundai	Accent WRC3	(South Korea) Hyundai World Rally Team	M	11	(Belgium) Freddy Loix	(Belgium) Sven Smeets	1-10
Škoda	Octavia WRC Evo3 1-7; Fabia WRC 8-14	(Czech Republic) Škoda Motorsport	M	14	(France) Didier Auriol	(France) Denis Giraudet	All
Škoda	Octavia WRC Evo3 1-7; Fabia WRC 8-14	(Czech Republic) Škoda Motorsport	M	15	(Finland) Toni Gardemeister	(Finland) Paavo Lukander	All
Citroën	Xsara WRC	(France) Citroën Total	M	17	(Scotland) Colin McRae	(Scotland) Derek Ringer	All
Citroën	Xsara WRC	(France) Citroën Total	M	18	(France) Sébastien Loeb	(Monaco) Daniel Elena	All
Citroën	Xsara WRC	(France) Citroën Total	M	19	(Spain) Carlos Sainz	(Spain) Marc Martí	All
Citroën	Xsara WRC	(France) Citroën Total	M	20	(France) Philippe Bugalski	(France) Jean-Paul Chiaroni	8, 11–13

World Rally Car entries ineligible to score manufacturer points
Manufacturer	Car	Team	Tyre	Drivers	Co-Drivers	Rounds
Ford	Focus RS WRC 02	(United States) Ford Motor Co Ltd	M	(Finland) Mikko Hirvonen	(Finland) Jarmo Lehtinen	All
Ford	Focus RS WRC 02	(United States) Ford Motor Co Ltd	M	(Finland) Jari-Matti Latvala	(United Kingdom) Carl Williamson	6
Ford	Focus RS WRC 02	(United States) Ford Motor Co Ltd	M	(Finland) Jari-Matti Latvala	(Finland) Miikka Anttila	8-9, 14
Peugeot	206 WRC	(France) Bozian Racing	M	(France) Gilles Panizzi	(France) Herve Panizzi	3, 6-7, 14
Peugeot	206 WRC	(France) Bozian Racing	M	(Czech Republic) Roman Kresta	(Czech Republic) Miloš Hůlka	1–2, 6
Peugeot	206 WRC	(France) Bozian Racing	M	(Czech Republic) Roman Kresta	(Czech Republic) Jan Tománek	8, 11, 13–14
Peugeot	206 WRC	(France) Bozian Racing	M	(Finland) Juuso Pykälistö	(Finland) Esko Mertsalmi	2–3, 6–7, 9
Peugeot	206 WRC	(France) Bozian Racing	M	(Finland) Juuso Pykälistö	(Finland) Risto Mannisenmäki	14
Peugeot	206 WRC	(France) Bozian Racing	M	(Finland) Ari Vatanen	(Finland) Juha Repo	9
Peugeot	206 WRC	(Austria) Stohl Racing	M	(Austria) Manfred Stohl	(Austria) Ilka Minor	4, 12, 14
Peugeot	206 WRC	Peugeot Sport Finland	M	(Finland) Sebastian Lindholm	(Finland) Timo Hantunen	9
Peugeot	206 WRC	Equipe de France FFSA	M	(France) Cédric Robert	(France) Gérald Bedon	1, 8, 11–13
Peugeot	206 WRC	(France) Team BSA	M	(France) Alexandre Bengue	(France) Caroline Escudero	12
Ford	Focus RS WRC 02	(Germany) AW Rally Team	M	(Germany) Antony Warmbold	(United Kingdom) Gemma Price	1–2, 4–10, 12–14
Ford	Focus RS WRC 02	(Finland) LPM Racing	M	(Finland) Janne Tuohino	(Finland) Jukka Aho	2, 9
Ford	Focus RS WRC 02	Kuchar Team Poland	M	(Poland) Tomasz Kuchar	(Poland) Maciek Szczepaniak	2, 4, 6
Ford	Focus RS WRC 02	(Finland) Wrüth Sport	M	(Finland) Jari Viita	(Finland) Teppo Leino	2
Ford	Focus RS WRC 02	(Finland) Wrüth Sport	M	(Finland) Jari Viita	(Finland) Riku Rousku	9
Ford	Focus RS WRC 02	(Greece) Ford Motor Hellas	M	(Greece) Ioannis Papadimitriou	(United Kingdom) Allan Harryman	2, 6
Ford	Focus RS WRC 02	(Greece) Ford Motor Hellas	M	(Greece) Armodios Vovos	(Greece) Loris Meletopoulos	6
Ford	Focus RS WRC 02	(Hungary) OMV Best Racing Team	M	(Hungary) Balázs Benik	(Hungary) Bence Rácz	3, 10
Ford	Focus RS WRC 02	(Turkey) Ford Hazirkart Rally Team	M	(Turkey) Serkan Yazici	(Turkey) Can Okan	3
Ford	Focus RS WRC 02	(United Kingdom) ADR Motorsport	M	(United Kingdom) Alistair Ginley	(Republic of Ireland) Rory Kennedy	3, 6–9, 12–14
Ford	Focus RS WRC 02	(United States) Ford Rallye Sport	M	(Finland) Mikko Hirvonen	(Finland) Jarmo Lehtinen	All
Ford	Focus RS WRC 02	(United States) Ford Rallye Sport	M	(Finland) Jari-Matti Latvala	(United Kingdom) Carl Williamson	6
Ford	Focus RS WRC 02	(United States) Ford Rallye Sport	M	(Finland) Jari-Matti Latvala	(Finland) Miikka Anttila	8–9, 14
Subaru	Impreza WRC99	(United Kingdom) Dom Buckley Motorsport	P	(Republic of Ireland) Eamonn Boland	(Republic of Ireland) Francis Regan	1
Subaru	Impreza WRC2001	(United Kingdom) Morgan Motorsport		(Finland) Tapio Laukkanen	(Finland) Harri Kaapro	14
Mitsubishi	Lancer Evo WRC2	(Japan) Mitsubishi Ralliart Europe	M	(Finland) Kristian Sohlberg	(Finland) Jakke Honkanen	2, 4, 8
Mitsubishi	Lancer Evo WRC2	(Japan) Mitsubishi Ralliart Europe	M	(United Kingdom) Alister McRae	(United Kingdom) David Senior	4
Mitsubishi	Lancer Evo WRC2	(Japan) Mitsubishi Ralliart Europe	M	(Finland) Jani Paasonen	(Finland) Arto Kapanen	8
Toyota	Corolla WRC	(Switzerland) Olivier Burri	P	(Switzerland) Olivier Burri	(Switzerland) Christophe Hofmann	1
Ford	Focus RS WRC 01	(Switzerland) Philippe Roux	P	(Switzerland) Philippe Roux	(Switzerland) Paul Corthay	1
Škoda	Octavia WRC	(Italy) Riccardo Errani	P	(Italy) Riccardo Errani	(Italy) Stefano Casadio	1
Škoda	Octavia WRC Evo2	(Italy) Riccardo Errani		(Italy) Riccardo Errani	(Italy) Stefano Casadio	11
Toyota	Corolla WRC	(Hungary) Gergely Szabó	P	(Hungary) Gergely Szabó	(Hungary) Zoltán Köhler	1
Peugeot	206 WRC	(France) Serge Bernardin	M	(France) Serge Bernardin	(France) Frédéric Deziré	1
Ford	Focus RS WRC 02	(Sweden) Andreas Eriksson	P	(Sweden) Andreas Eriksson	(Sweden) Patrick Henriksson	2
Ford	Focus RS WRC 02	(Sweden) Andreas Eriksson	P	(Sweden) Andreas Eriksson	(Sweden) Pecka Svensson	14
Hyundai	Accent WRC2	(Norway) Thomas Kolberg	C	(Norway) Thomas Kolberg	(Norway) Pål Iversen	2
Hyundai	Accent WRC2	(Norway) Kristian Kolberg		(Norway) Kristian Kolberg	(Norway) Kjell Peterssen	2
Hyundai	Accent WRC3	(South Korea) Hyundai World Rally Team	M	(Finland) Jussi Välimäki	(Finland) Tero Gardemeister	2, 4, 6, 9
Hyundai	Accent WRC3	(South Korea) Hyundai World Rally Team	M	(United Kingdom) Justin Dale	(United Kingdom) Andrew Bargery	7-8
Hyundai	Accent WRC3	(South Korea) Hyundai World Rally Team	M	(Austria) Manfred Stohl	(Austria) Ilka Minor	6, 8, 10
Toyota	Corolla WRC	(Norway) Thomas Schie	M	(Norway) Thomas Schie	(Norway) Ragnar Engen	2
Toyota	Corolla WRC	(Argentina) Gabriel Raies	P	(Argentina) Gabriel Raies	(Argentina) Jorge Perez Companc	5
Toyota	Corolla WRC	(Italy) Giovanni Recordati		(Italy) Giovanni Recordati	(Monaco) Freddy Delorme	7
Toyota	Corolla WRC	(Netherlands) Wevers Sport	M	(Netherlands) Erik Wevers	(Netherlands) Michiel Poel	8
Toyota	Corolla WRC	(United Kingdom) Gareth Jones	K	(United Kingdom) Gareth Jones	(United Kingdom) Mark Jones	9
Toyota	Corolla WRC	(France) José Micheli		(France) José Micheli	(France) Marie-Josée Cardi	12
Toyota	Corolla WRC	(Slovakia) Jozef Béreš jun.	M	(Slovakia) Jozef Béreš jun.	(Czech Republic) Petr Starý	2, 6, 14
Ford	Focus RS WRC 02	(Finland) Kaj Kuistila		(Finland) Kaj Kuistila	(Finland) Kari Jokinen	9
Peugeot	206 WRC	(France) Didier Cormoreche	M	(France) Didier Cormoreche	(France) René Belleville	12
Subaru	Impreza WRC2003	(France) Benoît Rousselot		(France) Benoît Rousselot	(France) Gilles Mondésir	12
Subaru	Impreza WRC2001	(Portugal) Armando Pereira	M	(Portugal) Armando Pereira	(France) Mickaële Rouillon	12
Peugeot	206 WRC	(France) Jean-Claude Torre	M	(France) Jean-Claude Torre	(France) Patrick de la Foata	12
Subaru	Impreza WRC99	(France) Alain Vauthier		(France) Alain Vauthier	(Belgium) Erwin Mombaerts	12
Toyota	Corolla WRC	(Sweden) Tobias Johansson		(Sweden) Tobias Johansson	(Sweden) Per Carlsson	14
Subaru	Impreza WRC2001	(Republic of Ireland) Eamonn Boland		(Republic of Ireland) Eamonn Boland	(Republic of Ireland) Francis Regan	14
Ford	Focus RS WRC 02	(United Kingdom) Steve Perez		(United Kingdom) Steve Perez	(United Kingdom) Jonty Bolsover	14
Citroën	Xsara WRC	(France) Citroën Sport	M	(Spain) Daniel Solà	(Spain) Álex Romaní	6, 14
Škoda	Octavia WRC Evo3	(Czech Republic) Škoda Matador Team	M	(Czech Republic) Jan Kopecký	(Czech Republic) Filip Schovánek	8, 14
Škoda	Octavia WRC Evo3	(Argentina) Gabriel Pozzo		(Argentina) Gabriel Pozzo	(Argentina) Daniel Stillo	5
Škoda	Octavia WRC Evo2	(Germany) Škoda Auto Deutschland	M	(Germany) Matthias Kahle	(Germany) Peter Göbel	8

=== JWRC entries ===
Team	Manufacturer	Car	No	Drivers	Co-drivers	Rounds
(Italy) Purity Auto	Fiat	Punto S1600	51	(San Marino) Mirco Baldacci	(Italy) Giovanni Bernacchini	1, 3, 6, 9, 11, 13–14
(Japan) Suzuki Sport	Suzuki	Ignis S1600	52	(Sweden) Daniel Carlsson	(Sweden) Mattias Andersson	1, 3, 6, 9, 11, 13–14
(Japan) Suzuki Sport	Suzuki	Ignis S1600	64	(Finland) Ville-Pertti Teuronen	(Finland) Harri Kaapro	1, 3, 6, 9, 11
(Japan) Suzuki Sport	Suzuki	Ignis S1600	64	(Finland) Ville-Pertti Teuronen	(Finland) Mikko Markkula	13–14
(Japan) Suzuki Sport	Suzuki	Ignis S1600	69	(Spain) Salvador Cañellas	(Spain) Xavier Amigó	1, 3, 6, 9, 11, 13–14
(Japan) Suzuki Sport	Suzuki	Ignis S1600	71	(Estonia) Urmo Aava	(Estonia) Kuldar Sikk	1, 3, 6, 9, 11, 13–14
(Austria) Schmidt Racing	Peugeot	206 S1600	53	(Austria) David Doppelreiter	(Norway) Ola Fløene	1
(Germany) Volkswagen Racing	Volkswagen	Polo S1600	54	(Finland) Kosti Katajamäki	(Finland) Miikka Anttila	1, 3, 6
(Germany) Volkswagen Racing	Volkswagen	Polo S1600	54	(Finland) Kosti Katajamäki	(Finland) Jani Laaksonen	9, 11, 13–14
(Germany) Volkswagen Racing	Volkswagen	Polo S1600	62	(Sweden) Oscar Svedlund	(Sweden) Björn Nilsson	1, 3, 6, 9, 11, 13–14
(Germany) Volkswagen Racing	Volkswagen	Polo S1600	73	(Bulgaria) Krum Donchev	(Bulgaria) Ruman Manolov	14
(Germany) Volkswagen Racing	Volkswagen	Polo S1600	78	(Germany) Vladan Vasiljevic	(Germany) Sebastian Geipel	1, 3, 6, 11
(United Kingdom) Ford Motor Co Ltd	Ford	Puma S1600	55	(Norway) Martin Stenshorne	(United Kingdom) Clive Jenkins	1, 3, 6
(United Kingdom) Ford Motor Co Ltd	Ford	Puma S1600	70	(United Kingdom) Guy Wilks	(United Kingdom) Phil Pugh	1, 3, 6, 9, 11, 13–14
(Italy) Auto Sport Italia	Peugeot	206 S1600	57	(Bulgaria) Dimitar Iliev	(Bulgaria) Petar Sivov	1, 3, 6
(Italy) Auto Sport Italia	Peugeot	206 S1600	57	(Bulgaria) Dimitar Iliev	(Bulgaria) Yanaki Yanakiev	9, 11, 13–14
(Italy) Auto Sport Italia	Peugeot	206 S1600	73	(Bulgaria) Krum Donchev	(Bulgaria) Ruman Manolov	1, 3, 6, 9, 11, 13
(Italy) Top Run SRL	Fiat	Punto S1600	58	(Argentina) Marcos Ligato	(Argentina) Rubén García	1, 3, 6, 9, 11, 13–14
(Italy) Top Run SRL	Fiat	Punto S1600	63	(Italy) Massimo Ceccato	(Italy) Mitia Dotta	1, 3, 6, 9, 11, 13–14
(Italy) Top Run SRL	Fiat	Punto S1600	76	(Italy) Luca Cecchettini	(Italy) Marco Muzzarelli	1, 3, 6, 9, 11, 13–14
(Italy) Astra Racing	Ford	Puma S1600	59	(Austria) Beppo Harrach	(Germany) Michael Kölbach	1, 3, 6, 11, 14
(Italy) Astra Racing	Ford	Puma S1600	65	(Lebanon) Abdo Feghali	(Lebanon) Joseph Matar	1, 3, 6, 9, 11, 13–14
(Italy) Jolly Club	Citroën	Saxo S1600	60	(Czech Republic) Pavel Valoušek	(Italy) Pierangelo Scalvini	1, 3
(France) Renault Sport	Renault	Clio S1600	61	(France) Brice Tirabassi	(France) Jacques-Julien Renucci	1, 3, 6, 9, 11, 13–14
(France) Citroën Sport	Citroën	Saxo S1600	66	(France) Sébastien Ceccone	(France) Julien Giroux	1, 3, 6
(San Marino) Sab Motorsport	Opel	Corsa S1600	67	(San Marino) Alessandro Broccoli	(Italy) Simona Girelli	1, 3, 6, 9, 11
(San Marino) Sab Motorsport	Opel	Corsa S1600	67	(San Marino) Alessandro Broccoli	(Italy) Giovanni Agnese	13–14
Renault Croatia	Renault	Clio S1600	68	(Croatia) Juraj Šebalj	(Croatia) Toni Klinc	1, 3, 6
(Italy) Errepi Racing	Fiat	Punto S1600	72	(San Marino) Jader Vagnini	(Italy) Lorenzo Granai	1
(Germany) Opel Motorsport	Opel	Corsa S1600	74	(United Kingdom) Kris Meeke	(United Kingdom) Chris Patterson	1, 3, 6, 9, 11, 13–14
(Poland) Orlen Team	Citroën	Saxo S1600	75	(Poland) Dariusz Chudobinski	(Poland) Przemysław Szulc	1
(Switzerland) Chicco d'Oro	Fiat	Punto S1600	77	(Switzerland) Filippo Suessli	(Switzerland) Loris Pala	1
Peugeot Dealer Team Sweden	Peugeot	206 S1600	78	(Germany) Vladan Vasiljevic	(Germany) Sebastian Geipel	9

=== PWRC entries ===
Team	Manufacturer	Car	No	Drivers	Co-drivers	Rounds
(Malaysia) Petronas EON Racing Team	Proton	Pert	51	(Malaysia) Karamjit Singh	(Malaysia) Allen Oh	2, 4–5, 7–8, 10
(Italy) Mauro Rally Tuning	Mitsubishi	Lancer Evo VIII	52	(Spain) Daniel Solà	(Spain) Álex Romaní	12
(Italy) Mauro Rally Tuning	Mitsubishi	Lancer Evo VII	52	(Spain) Daniel Solà	(Spain) Álex Romaní	4–5, 7–8, 10
(Italy) Mauro Rally Tuning	Mitsubishi	Lancer Evo VII	53	(Peru) Ramón Ferreyros	(Mexico) Javier Marin	5, 8, 12
(Italy) Mauro Rally Tuning	Mitsubishi	Lancer Evo VI	53	(Peru) Ramón Ferreyros	(Mexico) Javier Marin	4, 7, 10
(Italy) Mauro Rally Tuning	Mitsubishi	Lancer Evo VI	56	(Uruguay) Gustavo Trelles	(Argentina) Jorge Del Buono	4
(Italy) Mauro Rally Tuning	Mitsubishi	Lancer Evo VII	57	(Italy) Giovanni Manfrinato	(Italy) Claudio Condotta	7–8, 10
(Japan) Subaru Production Rally Team	Subaru	Impreza WRX STI	54	(Japan) Toshihiro Arai	(New Zealand) Tony Sircombe	2, 4–5, 7, 10, 12
(Japan) Subaru Production Rally Team	Subaru	Impreza WRX STI	62	(New Zealand) Peter 'Possum' Bourne	(Australia) Mark Stacey	2, 4
(United Kingdom) David Sutton Cars Ltd	Subaru	Impreza WRX STI	55	(United Kingdom) Martin Rowe	(United Kingdom) Trevor Agnew	2, 4, 7–8, 10, 12
(United Kingdom) David Sutton Cars Ltd	Subaru	Impreza WRX STI	65	(Sweden) Stig Blomqvist	(Venezuela) Ana Goñi	2, 4, 7–8, 10, 12
(Italy) Top Run SRL	Mitsubishi	Lancer Evo VI	57	(Italy) Giovanni Manfrinato	(Italy) Claudio Condotta	4–5
(Italy) Top Run SRL	Mitsubishi	Lancer Evo VII	58	(Argentina) Marcos Ligato	(Argentina) Rubén García	4–5, 7–8, 10, 12
(Italy) Top Run SRL	Mitsubishi	Lancer Evo VII	59	(Italy) Stefano Marrini	(Italy) Massimo Agotinelli	2, 5, 7–8
(Italy) Top Run SRL	Mitsubishi	Lancer Evo VI	59	(Italy) Stefano Marrini	(Italy) Massimo Agotinelli	10, 12
(Italy) Top Run SRL	Mitsubishi	Lancer Evo VI	63	(Italy) Luca Baldini	(Italy) Alessandro Floris	2, 4–5
(New Zealand) Neil Allport Motorsports	Mitsubishi	Lancer Evo VI	60	(United Kingdom) Niall McShea	(United Kingdom) Chris Patterson	4–5, 7–8, 10, 12
Mobil 1 Team Poland	Mitsubishi	Lancer Evo VI	61	(Poland) Janusz Kulig	(Poland) Jarosław Baran	2, 4
Mobil 1 Team Poland	Mitsubishi	Lancer Evo VI	61	(Poland) Janusz Kulig	(Poland) Dariusz Burkat	7–8
Mobil 1 Team Poland	Mitsubishi	Lancer Evo VI	61	(Poland) Janusz Kulig	(Poland) Maciek Szczepaniak	10, 12
(Sweden) Millbrooks World Rally Team	Mitsubishi	Lancer Evo VI	64	(Sweden) Joakim Roman	(Sweden) Tina Mitakidou	2, 4, 7–8
(Sweden) Millbrooks World Rally Team	Mitsubishi	Lancer Evo VI	64	(Sweden) Joakim Roman	(Sweden) Ragnar Spjuth	10, 12
(Austria) Stohl Racing	Mitsubishi	Lancer Evo VII	66	(Oman) Hamed Al Wahaibi	(United Kingdom) Nicky Beech	4–5
(Austria) Stohl Racing	Mitsubishi	Lancer Evo VII	72	(Romania) Constantin Aur	(Romania) Silviu Moraru	2
(Austria) Stohl Racing	Mitsubishi	Lancer Evo VII	72	(Romania) Constantin Aur	(Romania) Adrian Berghea	4, 7–8, 10, 12
(Poland) Orlen Team	Mitsubishi	Lancer Evo VII	67	(Poland) Krzysztof Hołowczyc	(Poland) Łukasz Kurzeja	2, 4–5, 7–8
Kuchar Team Poland	Mitsubishi	Lancer Evo VI	68	(Poland) Tomasz Kuchar	(Poland) Maciek Szczepaniak	14
(Belgium) Guy Colsoul Rallysport	Mitsubishi	Lancer Evo VII	69	(Belgium) Bob Colsoul	(Belgium) Tom Colsoul	2, 5, 7–8, 12
(Belgium) Guy Colsoul Rallysport	Mitsubishi	Lancer Evo VII	77	(Italy) Alfredo De Dominicis	(Italy) Giovanni Bernacchini	5
(Italy) Errani Team Group	Mitsubishi	Lancer Evo VI	70	(Italy) Riccardo Errani	(Italy) Stefano Casadio	4–5, 7–8, 10, 12
(Bulgaria) Racing Team Burgaltabac	Mitsubishi	Lancer Evo VI	71	(Bulgaria) Georgi Geradzhiev	(Bulgaria) Nikola Popov	2, 4–5, 7–8, 12
(Czech Republic) Hanácký Rally Klub	Mitsubishi	Mitsubishi Lancer Evo VII	73	(Czech Republic) Stanislav Chovanec	(Czech Republic) Karel Holaň	2
(Italy) Motoring Club	Mitsubishi	Lancer Evo VI	74	(Italy) Fabio Frisiero	(Italy) Loris Roggia	2
(Italy) Motoring Club	Mitsubishi	Lancer Evo VII	74	(Italy) Fabio Frisiero	(Italy) Loris Roggia	4–5
(Italy) Motoring Club	Mitsubishi	Lancer Evo VII	74	(Italy) Fabio Frisiero	(Italy) Giovanni Agnese	7–8, 12
Subaru Rally Team Canada	Subaru	Impreza WRX STI	76	(Canada) Patrick Richard	(United Kingdom) Martin Headland	2
Subaru Rally Team Canada	Subaru	Impreza WRX STI	76	(Canada) Patrick Richard	(Sweden) Mikael Johansson	4–5, 7
Subaru Rally Team Canada	Subaru	Impreza WRX STI	76	(Canada) Patrick Richard	(Norway) Ola Fløene	8, 12
Ralliart Italy	Mitsubishi	Lancer Evo VI	77	(Italy) Alfredo De Dominicis	(Italy) Giovanni Bernacchini	2, 5, 7–8, 12
(Belgium) First Motorsport	Mitsubishi	Lancer Evo VI	78	(Poland) Łukasz Sztuka	(Sweden) Per Carlsson	2
(Belgium) First Motorsport	Mitsubishi	Lancer Evo VI	78	(Poland) Łukasz Sztuka	(Poland) Zbigniew Cieslar	4–5, 8
(Mexico) Triviño Racing	Mitsubishi	Lancer Evo VII	80	(Mexico) Ricardo Triviño	(Spain) Jordi Barradés	2, 4–5, 7–8, 12

== Results and standings ==
=== Rally results ===
The highest finishing competitor entered in each WRC class is listed below. Non-championship entries may have finished ahead of WRC competitors in individual rounds.

Rd.	Rally	Overall winners	PWRC Winners	JWRC winners	Report
1	(Monaco) Monte Carlo	(France) No. 18 Citroën Total WRT	N/A	(France) No. 61 Renault Sport	Report
1	(Monaco) Monte Carlo	(France) Citroën Xsara WRC	N/A	(France) Renault Clio S1600	Report
1	(Monaco) Monte Carlo	(France) Sébastien Loeb (Monaco) Daniel Elena	N/A	(France) Brice Tirabassi (France) Jacques-Julien Renucci	Report
2	Sweden	(France) No. 1 Marlboro Peugeot Total	(United Kingdom) No. 75 David Sutton Cars Ltd	N/A	Report
2	Sweden	(France) Peugeot 206 WRC	(Japan) Subaru Impreza STi N8	N/A	Report
2	Sweden	(Finland) Marcus Grönholm (Finland) Timo Rautiainen	(Sweden) Stig Blomqvist (Venezuela) Ana Goñi	N/A	Report
3	Turkey	(France) No. 19 Citroën Total WRT	N/A	(Germany) No. 54 Volkswagen Racing	Report
3	Turkey	(France) Citroën Xsara WRC	N/A	(Germany) Volkswagen Polo S1600	Report
3	Turkey	(Spain) Carlos Sainz (Spain) Marc Martí	N/A	(Finland) Kosti Katajamäki (Finland) Miikka Anttila	Report
4	New Zealand	(France) No. 1 Marlboro Peugeot Total	(Japan) No. 54 Subaru Production Rally Team	N/A	Report
4	New Zealand	(France) Peugeot 206 WRC	(Japan) Subaru Impreza WRX STi	N/A	Report
4	New Zealand	(Finland) Marcus Grönholm (Finland) Timo Rautiainen	(Japan) Toshihiro Arai (New Zealand) Tony Sircombe	N/A	Report
5	Argentina	(France) No. 1 Marlboro Peugeot Total	(Japan) No. 54 Subaru Production Rally Team	N/A	Report
5	Argentina	(France) Peugeot 206 WRC	(Japan) Subaru Impreza WRX STi	N/A	Report
5	Argentina	(Finland) Marcus Grönholm (Finland) Timo Rautiainen	(Japan) Toshihiro Arai (New Zealand) Tony Sircombe	N/A	Report
6	Greece	(United States) No. 4 Ford Motor Co	N/A	(France) No. 61 Renault Sport	Report
6	Greece	(United States) Ford Focus RS WRC '03	N/A	(France) Renault Clio S1600	Report
6	Greece	(Estonia) Markko Märtin (United Kingdom) Michael Park	N/A	(France) Brice Tirabassi (France) Jacques-Julien Renucci	Report
7	Cyprus	(Japan) No. 7 555 Subaru WRT	(Japan) No. 54 Subaru Production Rally Team	N/A	Report
7	Cyprus	(Japan) Subaru Impreza S9 WRC '03	(Japan) Subaru Impreza WRX STi	N/A	Report
7	Cyprus	(Norway) Petter Solberg (United Kingdom) Phil Mills	(Japan) Toshihiro Arai (New Zealand) Tony Sircombe	N/A	Report
8	Germany	(France) No. 18 Citroën Total WRT	(Italy) No. 52 Mauro Rally Tuning	N/A	Report
8	Germany	(France) Citroën Xsara WRC	(Japan) Mitsubishi Lancer Evo VII	N/A	Report
8	Germany	(France) Sébastien Loeb (Monaco) Daniel Elena	(Spain) Dani Solà (Spain) Álex Romaní	N/A	Report
9	Finland	(United States) No. 4 Ford Motor Co	N/A	(Japan) No. 52 Suzuki Sport	Report
9	Finland	(United States) Ford Focus RS WRC '03	N/A	(Japan) Suzuki Ignis S1600	Report
9	Finland	(Estonia) Markko Märtin (United Kingdom) Michael Park	N/A	(Sweden) Daniel Carlsson (Sweden) Mattias Andersson	Report
10	Australia	(Japan) No. 7 555 Subaru WRT	(United Kingdom) No. 55 David Sutton Cars Ltd	N/A	Report
10	Australia	(Japan) Subaru Impreza S9 WRC '03	(Japan) Subaru Impreza STi N10	N/A	Report
10	Australia	(Norway) Petter Solberg (United Kingdom) Phil Mills	(United Kingdom) Martin Rowe (United Kingdom) Trevor Agnew	N/A	Report
11	Italy	(France) No. 18 Citroën Total WRT	N/A	(Italy) No. 51 Purity Auto	Report
11	Italy	(France) Citroën Xsara WRC	N/A	(Italy) Fiat Punto S1600	Report
11	Italy	(France) Sébastien Loeb (Monaco) Daniel Elena	N/A	(San Marino) Mirco Baldacci (Italy) Giovanni Bernacchini	Report
12	France	(Japan) No. 7 555 Subaru WRT	(United Kingdom) No. 60 Neil Allport Motorsports	N/A	Report
12	France	(Japan) Subaru Impreza S9 WRC '03	(Japan) Mitsubishi Lancer Evo VI	N/A	Report
12	France	(Norway) Petter Solberg (United Kingdom) Phil Mills	(United Kingdom) Niall McShea (United Kingdom) Chris Patterson	N/A	Report
13	Spain	(France) No. 3 Marlboro Peugeot Total	N/A	(France) No. 61 Renault Sport	Report
13	Spain	(France) Peugeot 206 WRC	N/A	(France) Renault Clio S1600	Report
13	Spain	(France) Gilles Panizzi (France) Hervé Panizzi	N/A	(France) Brice Tirabassi (France) Jacques-Julien Renucci	Report
14	(United Kingdom) Britain	(Japan) No. 7 555 Subaru WRT	N/A	(Japan) No. 52 Suzuki Sport	Report
14	(United Kingdom) Britain	(Japan) Subaru Impreza S9 WRC '03	N/A	(Japan) Suzuki Ignis S1600	Report
14	(United Kingdom) Britain	(Norway) Petter Solberg (United Kingdom) Phil Mills	N/A	(Sweden) Daniel Carlsson (Sweden) Mattias Andersson	Report

=== Drivers' championship ===
Pos.	Driver	MON (Monaco)	SWE (Sweden)	TUR (Turkey)	NZL (New Zealand)	ARG (Argentina)	GRE (Greece)	CYP (Cyprus)	GER (Germany)	FIN (Finland)	AUS (Australia)	ITA (Italy)	FRA (France)	ESP (Spain)	GBR (United Kingdom)	Pts
1	(Norway) Petter Solberg	Ret	6	Ret	3	5	3	1	8	2	1	Ret	1	5	1	72
2	(France) Sébastien Loeb	1	7	Ret	4	Ret	Ret	3	1	5	2	1	13	2	2	71
3	(Spain) Carlos Sainz	3	9	1	12	2	2	5	6	4	5	4	2	7	Ret	63
4	(United Kingdom) Richard Burns	5	3	2	2	3	4	Ret	3	3	3	7	8	Ret		58
5	(Estonia) Markko Märtin	4	4	6	Ret	Ret	1	Ret	5	1	DSQ	3	Ret	3	Ret	49
6	(Finland) Marcus Grönholm	13	1	9	1	1	Ret	Ret	2	Ret	Ret	Ret	4	6	Ret	46
7	(United Kingdom) Colin McRae	2	5	4	Ret	Ret	8	4	4	Ret	4	6	5	9	4	45
8	(Finland) Tommi Mäkinen	Ret	2	8	7	Ret	5	Ret	Ret	6	6	10	7	8	3	30
9	(Belgium) François Duval	7	Ret	3	9	8	Ret	Ret	7	Ret	10	5	3	4	5	30
10	(France) Gilles Panizzi	Ret		5			7	Ret	10			2	6	1	Ret	27
11	(Finland) Harri Rovanperä		Ret	Ret	Ret	4	6	2		Ret	7				Ret	18
12	(Finland) Toni Gardemeister	Ret	8	7	5	7	Ret	Ret	Ret	Ret	11	Ret	11	12	Ret	9
13	(France) Didier Auriol	9	18	Ret	8	6	9	Ret	Ret	Ret	12	12	Ret	Ret	11	4
14	(Belgium) Freddy Loix	Ret	10	10	Ret	Ret	Ret	Ret	11	10	8				6	4
15	(France) Cédric Robert	6							9			9	12	11		3
16	(Finland) Mikko Hirvonen	Ret	11	Ret	10	16	Ret	6	13	Ret	9	Ret	10	14	Ret	3
17	(United Kingdom) Alister McRae				6											3
18	(Germany) Armin Schwarz	8	13	Ret	Ret	Ret	Ret	7	12	12	13					3
19	(Austria) Manfred Stohl				Ret		11		18		DNS		Ret		7	2
20	(Finland) Janne Tuohino		17							7						2
21	(France) Philippe Bugalski								Ret			8	9	10		1
22	(Czech Republic) Roman Kresta	10	14				Ret		Ret			11		13	8	1
23	(United Kingdom) Alistair Ginley			12			15	8	Ret	23			Ret	23	Ret	1
24	(Finland) Sebastian Lindholm									8						1
Pos.	Driver	MON (Monaco)	SWE (Sweden)	TUR (Turkey)	NZL (New Zealand)	ARG (Argentina)	GRE (Greece)	CYP (Cyprus)	GER (Germany)	FIN (Finland)	AUS (Australia)	ITA (Italy)	FRA (France)	ESP (Spain)	GBR (United Kingdom)	Pts

Key
Colour	Result
Gold	Winner
Silver	2nd place
Bronze	3rd place
Green	Points finish
Blue	Non-points finish
Blue	Non-classified finish (NC)
Purple	Did not finish (Ret)
Black	Excluded (EX)
Black	Disqualified (DSQ)
White	Did not start (DNS)
White	Cancelled (C)
Blank	Withdrew entry from the event (WD)

- Petter Solberg secured the drivers' championship title in Wales.

=== Manufacturers' championship ===
Manufacturer Teams must enter at least two cars. This allowed Manufacturers to have three or four cars registered on a single event, but only their best two result would count to the championship.

Pos.	Manufacturer	No.	MON (Monaco)	SWE (Sweden)	TUR (Turkey)	NZL (New Zealand)	ARG (Argentina)	GRE (Greece)	CYP (Cyprus)	GER (Germany)	FIN (Finland)	AUS (Australia)	ITA (Italy)	FRA (France)	ESP (Spain)	GBR (United Kingdom)	Points
1	(France) Citroën Total World Rally Team	17	2	5	4	Ret	Ret	7	4	4	Ret	4	(6)	5	(9)	4	160
1	(France) Citroën Total World Rally Team	18	1	7	Ret	4	Ret	Ret	3	1	5	2	1	(12)	2	2	160
1	(France) Citroën Total World Rally Team	19	(3)	(9)	1	(10)	2	2	(5)	(6)	4	(5)	4	2	7	Ret	160
1	(France) Citroën Total World Rally Team	20								Ret			(8)	(9)	(10)		160
2	(France) Marlboro Peugeot Total	1	8	1	8	1	1	Ret	Ret	2	Ret	Ret	Ret	4	6	Ret	145
2	(France) Marlboro Peugeot Total	2	4	3	2	2	3	4	Ret	3	3	3	6	(8)	Ret	6	145
2	(France) Marlboro Peugeot Total	3	Ret	Ret	Ret	Ret	(4)	6	2	(9)	Ret	6	2	6	1	Ret	145
3	(Japan) 555 Subaru World Rally Team	7	Ret	6	Ret	3	4	3	1	7	2	1	Ret	1	5	1	109
3	(Japan) 555 Subaru World Rally Team	8	Ret	2	7	6	Ret	5	Ret	Ret	6	5	7	7	8	3	109
4	(United Kingdom) Ford Motor Co	4	3	4	5	Ret	Ret	1	Ret	5	1	Ret	3	Ret	3	Ret	93
4	(United Kingdom) Ford Motor Co	5	5	Ret	3	8	7	Ret	Ret	6	Ret	9	5	3	4	5	93
4	(United Kingdom) Ford Motor Co	6	Ret	10	Ret	9	8	Ret	5	(12)	Ret	8	Ret	8	(12)	Ret	93
5	(Czech Republic) Škoda Motorsport	14	7	12	Ret	7	5	8	Ret	Ret	Ret	11	8	Ret	Ret	7	23
5	(Czech Republic) Škoda Motorsport	15	Ret	8	6	5	6	Ret	Ret	Ret	Ret	10	Ret	9	9	Ret	23
6	(South Korea) Hyundai World Rally Team	10	6	11	Ret	Ret	Ret	Ret	6	9	8	12					12
6	(South Korea) Hyundai World Rally Team	11	Ret	9	9	Ret	Ret	Ret	Ret	8	7	7					12
6	(South Korea) Hyundai World Rally Team	12		Ret		Ret		Ret	Ret	(13)	Ret						12
Pos.	Manufacturer	No.	MON (Monaco)	SWE (Sweden)	TUR (Turkey)	NZL (New Zealand)	ARG (Argentina)	GRE (Greece)	CYP (Cyprus)	GER (Germany)	FIN (Finland)	AUS (Australia)	ITA (Italy)	FRA (France)	ESP (Spain)	GBR (United Kingdom)	Points

Key
Colour	Result
Gold	Winner
Silver	2nd place
Bronze	3rd place
Green	Points finish
Blue	Non-points finish
Blue	Non-classified finish (NC)
Purple	Did not finish (Ret)
Black	Excluded (EX)
Black	Disqualified (DSQ)
White	Did not start (DNS)
White	Cancelled (C)
Blank	Withdrew entry from the event (WD)

- Citroën secured the manufacturers' championship in Wales, its first such title.
- Results in "()" means the car finished the rally, but two others of the same Manufacturer Team reached a better result.

=== JWRC Drivers' championship ===
Pos.	Driver	MON (Monaco)	TUR (Turkey)	GRE (Greece)	FIN (Finland)	ITA (Italy)	ESP (Spain)	GBR (United Kingdom)	Pts
1	(France) Brice Tirabassi	1	Ret	1	2	Ret	1	Ret	38
2	(Spain) Salvador Cañellas Jr.	Ret	2	4	5	2	3	4	36
3	(Sweden) Daniel Carlsson	Ret	Ret	2	1	Ret	4	1	33
4	(Estonia) Urmo Aava	4	Ret	3	4	Ret	5	Ret	20
5	(San Marino) Mirco Baldacci	7	Ret	Ret	Ret	1	Ret	2	20
6	(Finland) Ville-Pertti Teuronen	Ret	4	Ret	Ret	4	6	3	19
7	(United Kingdom) Guy Wilks	Ret	3	6	3	6	11	Ret	18
8	(San Marino) Alessandro Broccoli	3	Ret	Ret	6	Ret	Ret	5	13
9	(Argentina) Marcos Ligato	2	Ret	Ret	7	Ret			10
10	(Finland) Kosti Katajamäki	EX	1	Ret	Ret	Ret	Ret	Ret	10
11	(Italy) Massimo Ceccato	5	Ret	Ret	Ret	Ret	8	6	8
12	(Italy) Luca Cecchettini	9	5	Ret	Ret	5	10	Ret	8
13	(Bulgaria) Dimitar Iliev	Ret	7	Ret	Ret	3	Ret		8
14	(United Kingdom) Kris Meeke	12	Ret	Ret	Ret	Ret	2	Ret	8
15	(Lebanon) Abdo Feghali	10	3	Ret	Ret	7	7	Ret	7
16	(Sweden) Oscar Svedlund	Ret	Ret	5	8		Ret	Ret	5
17	(Croatia) Juraj Šebalj	6	Ret						3
18	(Austria) Beppo Harrach	8	Ret	Ret					1
19	(Bulgaria) Krum Donchev	11	Ret	Ret		Ret	9		0
20	(Germany) Vladan V-Man Vasiljevic	Ret	Ret	Ret	Ret				0
21	(Norway) Martin Stenshorne	Ret	Ret	Ret					0
22	(France) Sebastien Ceccone	Ret	Ret						0
Pos.	Driver	MON (Monaco)	TUR (Turkey)	GRE (Greece)	FIN (Finland)	ITA (Italy)	ESP (Spain)	GBR (United Kingdom)	Pts

Key
Colour	Result
Gold	Winner
Silver	2nd place
Bronze	3rd place
Green	Points finish
Blue	Non-points finish
Blue	Non-classified finish (NC)
Purple	Did not finish (Ret)
Black	Excluded (EX)
Black	Disqualified (DSQ)
White	Did not start (DNS)
White	Cancelled (C)
Blank	Withdrew entry from the event (WD)

=== PWRC Drivers' championship ===
Pos.	Driver	SWE (Sweden)	NZL (New Zealand)	ARG (Argentina)	CYP (Cyprus)	GER (Germany)	AUS (Australia)	FRA (France)	Pts
1	(United Kingdom) Martin Rowe	3	4		2	2	1	3	43
2	(Japan) Toshihiro Arai	Ret	1	1	1		Ret	2	38
3	(Sweden) Stig Blomqvist	1	8		3	5	4	5	30
4	(Malaysia) Karamjit Singh	2	6	3	Ret	4	2		30
5	(Spain) Daniel Solà		15	2	Ret	1	5	Ret	22
6	(United Kingdom) Niall McShea		7	Ret	Ret	Ret	3	1	18
7	(Argentina) Marcos Ligato		2	Ret	4	Ret	Ret		13
8	(Poland) Janusz Kulig	Ret	Ret		Ret	3		4	11
9	(Mexico) Ricardo Triviño	Ret	11	6	Ret	6		7	8
10	(Belgium) Bob Colsoul	9		Ret	5	Ret		6	7
11	(Oman) Hamed Al Wahaibi		3	Ret					6
12	(Italy) Riccardo Errani		Ret	7	6	9		8	6
13	(Sweden) Joakim Roman	6	12		Ret	Ret	6	9	6
14	(New Zealand) Peter 'Possum' Bourne	4	Ret						5
15	(Italy) Giovanni Manfrinato		9	4	Ret	Ret			5
16	(Poland) Krzysztof Hołowczyc	5	Ret			Ret			4
17	(Peru) Ramón Ferreyros		5	Ret	Ret	Ret	Ret	Ret	4
18	(Italy) Alfredo De Dominicis	10	13	5	Ret	Ret		Ret	4
19	(Poland) Łukasz Sztuka	7	Ret						2
20	(Romania) Constantin Aur	Ret	Ret		Ret	7	Ret		2
21	(Canada) Patrick Richard	8	Ret	Ret	Ret	Ret		Ret	1
22	(Italy) Stefano Marrini	Ret		Ret	Ret	8	Ret	10	1
Pos.	Driver	SWE (Sweden)	NZL (New Zealand)	ARG (Argentina)	CYP (Cyprus)	GER (Germany)	AUS (Australia)	FRA (France)	Pts

Key
Colour	Result
Gold	Winner
Silver	2nd place
Bronze	3rd place
Green	Points finish
Blue	Non-points finish
Blue	Non-classified finish (NC)
Purple	Did not finish (Ret)
Black	Excluded (EX)
Black	Disqualified (DSQ)
White	Did not start (DNS)
White	Cancelled (C)
Blank	Withdrew entry from the event (WD)

== Events ==
Round	Rally Name	Start-End Date	Podium Drivers (Finishing Time)	Podium Cars
1	(Monaco) Monte Carlo Rally	24 January–26 January	1. (France) Sébastien Loeb (4h:29m:11.4s); 2. (United Kingdom) Colin McRae (4h:29m:49.5s); 3. (Spain) Carlos Sainz (4h:30m:03.6s)	1. Citroën Xsara WRC; 2. Citroën Xsara WRC; 3. Citroën Xsara WRC
2	(Sweden) Swedish Rally	7 February–9 February	1. (Finland) Marcus Grönholm (3h:03m:28.1s); 2. (Finland) Tommi Mäkinen (3h:04m:18.9s); 3. (United Kingdom) Richard Burns (3h:04m:46.0s)	1. Peugeot 206 WRC; 2. Subaru Impreza WRC 2003; 3. Peugeot 206 WRC
3	Rally of Turkey	27 February–2 March	1. (Spain) Carlos Sainz (4h:32m:14.1s); 2. (United Kingdom) Richard Burns (4h:33m:02.0s); 3. (Belgium) François Duval (4h:34m:00.6s)	1. Citroën Xsara WRC; 2. Peugeot 206 WRC; 3. Ford Focus RS WRC 02
4	Rally New Zealand	11 April–13 April	1. (Finland) Marcus Grönholm (3h:45m:21.2s); 2. (United Kingdom) Richard Burns (3h:46m:29.9s); 3. (Norway) Petter Solberg (3h:47m:31.0s)	1. Peugeot 206 WRC; 2. Peugeot 206 WRC; 3. Subaru Impreza WRC 2003
5	Rally Argentina	8 May–11 May	1. (Finland) Marcus Grönholm (4h:14m:45.0s); 2. (Spain) Carlos Sainz (4h:15m:11.6s); 3. (United Kingdom) Richard Burns (4h:15m:57.8s)	1. Peugeot 206 WRC; 2. Citroën Xsara WRC; 3. Peugeot 206 WRC
6	(Greece) Acropolis Rally	6 June–8 June	1. (Estonia) Markko Märtin (4h:53m:40.5s); 2. (Spain) Carlos Sainz (4h:54m:26.5s); 3. (Norway) Petter Solberg (4h:54m:33.2s)	1. Ford Focus RS WRC 03; 2. Citroën Xsara WRC; 3. Subaru Impreza WRC 2003
7	Cyprus Rally	20 June–22 June	1. (Norway) Petter Solberg (5h:09m:12.6s); 2. (Finland) Harri Rovanperä (5h:13m:26.6s); 3. (France) Sébastien Loeb (5h:13m:29.4s)	1. Subaru Impreza WRC 2003; 2. Peugeot 206 WRC; 3. Citroën Xsara WRC
8	(Germany) Rallye Deutschland	25 July–27 July	1. (France) Sébastien Loeb (3h:46m:50.4s); 2. (Finland) Marcus Grönholm (3h:46m:54.0s); 3. (United Kingdom) Richard Burns (3h:47m:10.1s)	1. Citroën Xsara WRC; 2. Peugeot 206 WRC; 3. Peugeot 206 WRC
9	Rally Finland	7 August–10 August	1. (Estonia) Markko Märtin (3h:21m:51.7s); 2. (Norway) Petter Solberg (3h:22m:50.6s); 3. (United Kingdom) Richard Burns (3h:22m:51.8s)	1. Ford Focus RS WRC 03; 2. Subaru Impreza WRC 2003; 3. Peugeot 206 WRC
10	Rally Australia	4 September–7 September	1. (Norway) Petter Solberg (3h:32m:07.1s); 2. (France) Sébastien Loeb (3h:32m:33.7s); 3. (United Kingdom) Richard Burns (3h:34m:00.1s)	1. Subaru Impreza WRC 2003; 2. Citroën Xsara WRC; 3. Peugeot 206 WRC
11	(Italy) Rallye Sanremo	3 October–5 October	1. (France) Sébastien Loeb (4h:16m:33.7s); 2. (France) Gilles Panizzi (4h:17m:02.0s); 3. (Estonia) Markko Märtin (4h:17m:28.3s)	1. Citroën Xsara WRC; 2. Peugeot 206 WRC; 3. Ford Focus RS WRC 03
12	(France) Tour de Corse	17 October–19 October	1. (Norway) Petter Solberg (4h:20m:15.3s); 2. (Spain) Carlos Sainz (4h:20m:51.9s); 3. (Belgium) François Duval (4h:20m:57.0s)	1. Subaru Impreza WRC 2003; 2. Citroën Xsara WRC; 3. Ford Focus RS WRC 03
13	(Spain) Rally Catalunya	24 October–26 October	1. (France) Gilles Panizzi (3h:55m:09.4s); 2. (France) Sébastien Loeb (3h:55m:22.4s); 3. (Estonia) Markko Märtin (3h:55m:23.0s)	1. Peugeot 206 WRC; 2. Citroën Xsara WRC; 3. Ford Focus RS WRC 03
14	(United Kingdom) Wales Rally GB	6 November–9 November	1. (Norway) Petter Solberg (3h:28m:58.1s); 2. (France) Sébastien Loeb (3h:29m:41.7s); 3. (Finland) Tommi Mäkinen (3h:31m:56.9s)	1. Subaru Impreza WRC 2003; 2. Citroën Xsara WRC; 3. Subaru Impreza WRC 2003
