= Michelin Polska =

Michelin Polska S.A.
- Company type: Joint stock company
- Industry: tyres
- Founded: 1992; 34 years ago
- Headquarters: Olsztyn, Poland
- Revenue: 1,152,000,000 (2018)
- Net income: 40,300,000 (2018)
- Number of employees: 4500 (2017)

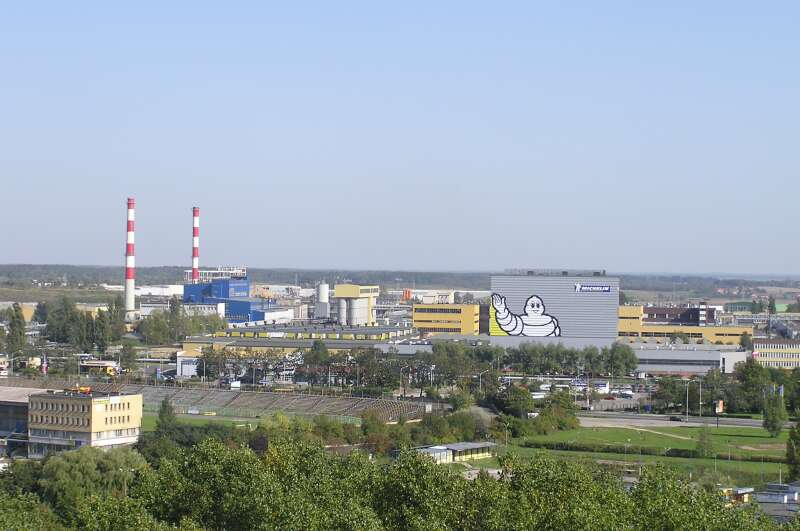
Michelin Polska S.A.

Michelin Polska (named Stomil Olsztyn until 2005) is a tyre manufacturer based in Olsztyn, Poland. The company came into existence when the tyre plant OZOS „Stomil”, founded in 1967, was privatized in 1992. In 1995, Michelin acquired the majority share in Stomil. From 1995 to May 28, 2004, Stomil was quoted at the Warsaw Stock Exchange. In 2005, Michelin gained full control of Stomil and renamed it to 'Michelin Polska S.A.'.

In 2024, Michelin Polska announced its decision to shut down its truck tyre manufacturing plant in Olsztyn, with production being relocated to Romania. The decision was attributed to high production costs.
