= Alistair Ginley =

British rally driver (born 1978)

Personal information
- Nationality: (United Kingdom) British
- Born: November 5, 1978 (age 48); Halifax, West Yorkshire, United Kingdom

World Rally Championship record
- Years active: 2000–2004
- Co-driver: (United Kingdom) Greg Haynes (United Kingdom) John Bennie (United Kingdom) Andrew Bargery (Republic of Ireland) Rory Kennedy
- Rallies: 20
- Championships: 0
- Rally wins: 0
- Podiums: 0
- Stage wins: 0
- Total points: 3
- First rally: 2000 Rally GB
- Last rally: 2004 Rally GB

Alistair Roger Ginley (born 5 November 1978) is a rally driver from England.

He started rallying in 1999. Alistair scored points in the 2003 and 2004 World Rally Championship seasons, both at Cyprus Rally.
