= 2005 Rally Finland =

Motor rally competition

2005 Rally Finland 55th Neste Rally Finland
Round 10 of the 2005 World Rally Championship season
← Previous event	Next event →
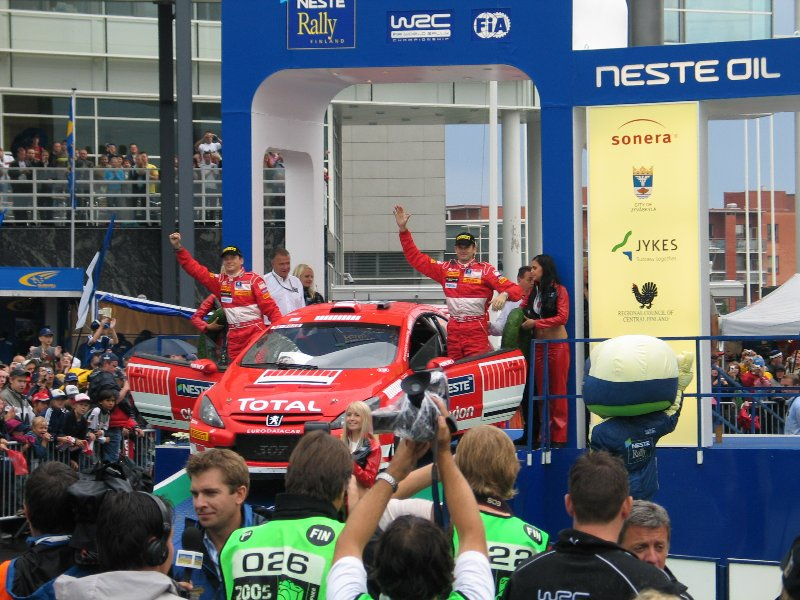
- Marcus Grönholm celebrates his win.
- Host country: Finland
- Rally base: Jyväskylä
- Dates run: August 4, 2005 – August 7, 2005
- Stages: 21 (355.59 km; 220.95 miles)
- Stage surface: Gravel
- Overall distance: 1,365.03 km (848.19 miles)

Statistics
- Crews: 77 at start, 49 at finish

Overall results
- Overall winner: (Finland) Marcus Grönholm (Finland) Timo Rautiainen (France) Marlboro Peugeot Total; Peugeot 307 WRC

The 2005 Rally Finland (formally the 55th Neste Rally Finland) was the tenth round of the 2005 World Rally Championship. The rally was held over four days between 4 August and 7 August 2005, and was won by Peugeot's Marcus Grönholm, his 17th win in the World Rally Championship.

== Background ==
=== Entry list ===
No.	Driver	Co-Driver	Entrant	Car	Tyre
World Rally Championship manufacturer entries
1	(France) Sébastien Loeb	(Monaco) Daniel Elena	(France) Citroën Total WRT	Citroën Xsara WRC	MI
2	(Belgium) François Duval	(Belgium) Sven Smeets	(France) Citroën Total WRT	Citroën Xsara WRC	MI
3	(Finland) Toni Gardemeister	(Finland) Jakke Honkanen	(United Kingdom) BP Ford World Rally Team	Ford Focus RS WRC '04	MI
4	(Finland) Mikko Hirvonen	(Finland) Jarmo Lehtinen	(United Kingdom) BP Ford World Rally Team	Ford Focus RS WRC '04	MI
5	(Norway) Petter Solberg	(United Kingdom) Phil Mills	(Japan) Subaru World Rally Team	Subaru Impreza S11 WRC '05	P
6	(Australia) Chris Atkinson	(Australia) Glenn Macneall	(Japan) Subaru World Rally Team	Subaru Impreza S11 WRC '05	P
7	(Finland) Marcus Grönholm	(Finland) Timo Rautiainen	(France) Marlboro Peugeot Total	Peugeot 307 WRC	P
8	(Estonia) Markko Märtin	(United Kingdom) Michael Park	(France) Marlboro Peugeot Total	Peugeot 307 WRC	P
9	(Finland) Harri Rovanperä	(Finland) Risto Pietiläinen	(Japan) Mitsubishi Motors	Mitsubishi Lancer WRC 05	P
10	(Italy) Gianluigi Galli	(Italy) Guido D'Amore	(Japan) Mitsubishi Motors	Mitsubishi Lancer WRC 05	P
11	(Germany) Armin Schwarz	(Germany) Klaus Wicha	(Czech Republic) Škoda Motorsport	Škoda Fabia WRC	MI
12	(Finland) Jani Paasonen	(Finland) Jani Vainikka	(Czech Republic) Škoda Motorsport	Škoda Fabia WRC	MI
World Rally Championship entries
14	(Czech Republic) Roman Kresta	(Czech Republic) Jan Možný	(United Kingdom) BP Ford World Rally Team	Ford Focus RS WRC '03	MI
15	(Norway) Henning Solberg	(Norway) Cato Menkerud	(United Kingdom) BP Ford World Rally Team	Ford Focus RS WRC '04	MI
16	(Germany) Antony Warmbold	(United Kingdom) Michael Orr	(United Kingdom) BP Ford World Rally Team	Ford Focus RS WRC '04	MI
17	(Finland) Janne Tuohino	(Finland) Mikko Markkula	(Czech Republic) Škoda Motorsport	Škoda Fabia WRC	MI
18	(Austria) Manfred Stohl	(Austria) Ilka Minor	(Belgium) OMV World Rally Team	Citroën Xsara WRC	MI
19	(Spain) Xavier Pons	(Spain) Carlos del Barrio	(Belgium) OMV World Rally Team	Citroën Xsara WRC	MI
24	(Finland) Kristian Sohlberg	(Finland) Timo Hantunen	(Finland) Red Devil Atolye Kazaz	Subaru Impreza S10 WRC '04	MI
25	(Finland) Sebastian Lindholm	(Finland) Tomi Tuominen	(Finland) Sebastian Lindholm	Peugeot 307 WRC	—N/a
24	(Finland) Jari-Matti Latvala	(Finland) Miikka Anttila	(Finland) Jari-Matti Latvala	Toyota Corolla WRC	MI
28	(Finland) Kaj Kuistila	(Finland) Kari Jokinen	(Finland) Kaj Kuistila	Mitsubishi Lancer WRC	—N/a
76	(Estonia) Gunnar Tamm	(Estonia) Kalev Kuzmin	(Estonia) Gunnar Tamm	Subaru Impreza WRX	—N/a
81	(Russia) Igor Sokolov	(Russia) Vasily Mirkotan	(Russia) Syrus Rally Team	Mitsubishi Lancer Evo VI	—N/a
84	(Italy) Fabrizio De Sanctis	(Italy) Iuri Rosignoli	(Italy) Fabrizio De Sanctis	Mitsubishi Lancer Evo VI	—N/a
JWRC entries
31	(Sweden) Per-Gunnar Andersson	(Sweden) Jonas Andersson	(Sweden) Per-Gunnar Andersson	Suzuki Swift S1600	P
32	(United Kingdom) Guy Wilks	(United Kingdom) Phil Pugh	(United Kingdom) Guy Wilks	Suzuki Swift S1600	P
33	(Finland) Kosti Katajamäki	(Finland) Timo Alanne	(Finland) Kosti Katajamäki	Suzuki Ignis S1600	P
34	(San Marino) Mirco Baldacci	(Italy) Giovanni Bernacchini	(San Marino) Mirco Baldacci	Fiat Punto S1600	P
35	(United Kingdom) Kris Meeke	(United Kingdom) Glenn Patterson	(United Kingdom) Kris Meeke	Citroën C2 S1600	P
36	(Estonia) Urmo Aava	(Estonia) Kuldar Sikk	(Estonia) Urmo Aava	Suzuki Ignis S1600	P
37	(Italy) Alan Scorcioni	(San Marino) Silvio Stefanelli	(Italy) Alan Scorcioni	Fiat Punto S1600	P
38	(Italy) Luca Betti	(Italy) Piercarlo Capolongo	(Italy) Luca Betti	Renault Clio S1600	P
40	(Zimbabwe) Conrad Rautenbach	(United Kingdom) Carl Williamson	(Zimbabwe) Conrad Rautenbach	Citroën C2 S1600	P
41	(Spain) Dani Sordo	(Spain) Marc Martí	(Spain) Dani Sordo	Citroën C2 S1600	P
42	(Czech Republic) Pavel Valoušek	(Italy) Pierangelo Scalvini	(Czech Republic) Pavel Valoušek	Suzuki Ignis S1600	P
43	(Czech Republic) Martin Prokop	(Czech Republic) Petr Gross	(Czech Republic) Martin Prokop	Suzuki Ignis S1600	P

=== Itinerary ===
All dates and times are EEST (UTC+3).

Date	Time	No.	Stage name	Distance
1. leg — 144.27 km
4 August	19:00	SS1	Killeri 1	2.06 km
5 August	08:51	SS2	Lankamaa	24.98 km
5 August	09:39	SS3	Laukaa	11.82 km
5 August	10:34	SS4	Ruuhimäki	7.57 km
5 August	12:38	SS5	Vellipohja 1	33.93 km
5 August	13:46	SS6	Mökkiperä 1	13.96 km
5 August	16:06	SS7	Vellipohja 2	33.93 km
5 August	17:14	SS8	Mökkiperä 2	13.96 km
5 August	18:37	SS9	Killeri 2	2.06 km
2. leg — 144.76 km
6 August	07:06	SS10	Vaheri	19.84 km
6 August	08:20	SS11	Ouninpohja Lansi 1	13.98 km
6 August	08:43	SS12	Ouninpohja Ita 1	16.55 km
6 August	11:44	SS13	Urria	10.00 km
6 August	13:07	SS14	Ouninpohja Lansi 2	13.98 km
6 August	13:30	SS15	Ouninpohja Ita 2	16.55 km
6 August	16:48	SS16	Moksi — Leustu	40.96 km
6 August	18:04	SS17	Himos	12.90 km
3. leg — 66.56 km
7 August	09:44	SS18	Kuohu 1	7.80 km
7 August	10:42	SS19	Kruununperä 1	25.48 km
7 August	11:55	SS20	Kuohu 2	7.80 km
7 August	12:53	SS21	Kruununperä 2	25.48 km

== Results ==
=== Overall ===
Pos.	No.	Driver	Co-driver	Team	Car	Time	Difference	Points
1	7	(Finland) Marcus Grönholm	(Finland) Timo Rautiainen	(France) Marlboro Peugeot Total	Peugeot 307 WRC	2:54:11.0		10
2	1	(France) Sébastien Loeb	(Monaco) Daniel Elena	(France) Citroën Total WRT	Citroën Xsara WRC	2:55:17.7	+1:06.7	8
3	7	(Estonia) Markko Märtin	(United Kingdom) Michael Park	(France) Marlboro Peugeot Total	Peugeot 307 WRC	2:55:46.6	+1:35.6	6
4	5	(Norway) Petter Solberg	(United Kingdom) Phil Mills	(Japan) Subaru World Rally Team	Subaru Impreza S11 WRC '05	2:56:19.0	+2:08.0	5
5	4	(Finland) Mikko Hirvonen	(Finland) Jarmo Lehtinen	(United Kingdom) BP Ford World Rally Team	Ford Focus RS WRC '04	2:56:24.6	+2:13.6	4
6	3	(Finland) Toni Gardemeister	(Finland) Jakke Honkanen	(United Kingdom) BP Ford World Rally Team	Ford Focus RS WRC '04	2:57:43.4	+3:32.4	3
7	9	(Finland) Harri Rovanperä	(Finland) Risto Pietiläinen	(Japan) Mitsubishi Motors	Mitsubishi Lancer WRC 05	2:58:38.9	+4:27.9	2
8	2	(Belgium) François Duval	(Belgium) Sven Smeets	(France) Citroën Total WRT	Citroën Xsara WRC	2:59:21.4	+5:10.4	1

=== World Rally Cars ===
==== Classification ====
Position		No.	Driver	Co-driver	Entrant	Car	Time	Difference	Points
Event	Class	No.	Driver	Co-driver	Entrant	Car	Time	Difference	Points
1	1	7	(Finland) Marcus Grönholm	(Finland) Timo Rautiainen	(France) Marlboro Peugeot Total	Peugeot 307 WRC	2:54:11.0		10
2	2	1	(France) Sébastien Loeb	(Monaco) Daniel Elena	(France) Citroën Total WRT	Citroën Xsara WRC	2:55:17.7	+1:06.7	8
3	3	8	(Estonia) Markko Märtin	(United Kingdom) Michael Park	(France) Marlboro Peugeot Total	Peugeot 307 WRC	2:55:46.6	+1:35.6	6
4	4	5	(Norway) Petter Solberg	(United Kingdom) Phil Mills	(Japan) Subaru World Rally Team	Subaru Impreza S11 WRC '05	2:56:19.0	+2:08.0	5
5	5	4	(Finland) Mikko Hirvonen	(Finland) Jarmo Lehtinen	(United Kingdom) BP Ford World Rally Team	Ford Focus RS WRC '04	2:56:24.6	+2:13.6	4
6	6	3	(Finland) Toni Gardemeister	(Finland) Jakke Honkanen	(United Kingdom) BP Ford World Rally Team	Ford Focus RS WRC '04	2:57:43.4	+3:32.4	3
7	7	9	(Finland) Harri Rovanperä	(Finland) Risto Pietiläinen	(Japan) Mitsubishi Motors	Mitsubishi Lancer WRC 05	2:58:38.9	+4:27.9	2
8	8	2	(Belgium) François Duval	(Belgium) Sven Smeets	(France) Citroën Total WRT	Citroën Xsara WRC	2:59:21.4	+5:10.4	1
11	9	11	(Germany) Armin Schwarz	(Germany) Klaus Wicha	(Czech Republic) Škoda Motorsport	Škoda Fabia WRC	3:04:28.5	+10:17.5	0
Retired SS20		6	(Australia) Chris Atkinson	(Australia) Glenn Macneall	(Japan) Subaru World Rally Team	Subaru Impreza S11 WRC '05	Mechanical		0
Retired SS12		10	(Italy) Gianluigi Galli	(Italy) Guido D'Amore	(Japan) Mitsubishi Motors	Mitsubishi Lancer WRC 05	Accident		0
Retired SS5		12	(Finland) Jani Paasonen	(Finland) Jani Vainikka	(Czech Republic) Škoda Motorsport	Škoda Fabia WRC	Lost wheel		0

==== Special stages ====
Day	Stage	Stage name	Length	Winner	Car	Time	Class leaders
1. leg (4 Aug)	SS1	Killeri 1	2.06 km	(Norway) Petter Solberg	Subaru Impreza S11 WRC '05	1:23.0	(Norway) Petter Solberg
1. leg (5 Aug)	SS2	Lankamaa	24.98 km	(France) Sébastien Loeb	Citroën Xsara WRC	11:57.1	(France) Sébastien Loeb
1. leg (5 Aug)	SS3	Laukaa	11.82 km	(Finland) Marcus Grönholm	Peugeot 307 WRC	5:39.2	(Finland) Marcus Grönholm
1. leg (5 Aug)	SS4	Ruuhimäki	7.57 km	(Finland) Marcus Grönholm	Peugeot 307 WRC	3:55.3	(Finland) Marcus Grönholm
1. leg (5 Aug)	SS5	Vellipohja 1	33.93 km	(Finland) Marcus Grönholm	Peugeot 307 WRC	17:03.7	(Finland) Marcus Grönholm
1. leg (5 Aug)	SS6	Mökkiperä 1	13.96 km	(Norway) Petter Solberg	Subaru Impreza S11 WRC '05	6:49.1	(Finland) Marcus Grönholm
1. leg (5 Aug)	SS7	Vellipohja 2	33.93 km	(Finland) Marcus Grönholm	Peugeot 307 WRC	16:57.1	(Finland) Marcus Grönholm
1. leg (5 Aug)	SS8	Mökkiperä 2	13.96 km	(France) Sébastien Loeb	Citroën Xsara WRC	6:47.5	(Finland) Marcus Grönholm
1. leg (5 Aug)	SS9	Killeri 2	2.06 km	(Finland) Marcus Grönholm	Peugeot 307 WRC	1:20.3	(Finland) Marcus Grönholm
2. leg (6 Aug)	SS10	Vaheri	19.84 km	(France) Sébastien Loeb	Citroën Xsara WRC	9:45.6	(Finland) Marcus Grönholm
2. leg (6 Aug)	SS11	Ouninpohja Lansi 1	13.98 km	(Finland) Marcus Grönholm	Peugeot 307 WRC	6:35.1	(Finland) Marcus Grönholm
2. leg (6 Aug)	SS12	Ouninpohja Ita 1	16.55 km	(Finland) Marcus Grönholm	Peugeot 307 WRC	7:54.5	(Finland) Marcus Grönholm
2. leg (6 Aug)	SS13	Urria	10.00 km	(Finland) Marcus Grönholm	Peugeot 307 WRC	4:39.6	(Finland) Marcus Grönholm
2. leg (6 Aug)	SS14	Ouninpohja Lansi 2	13.98 km	(Finland) Marcus Grönholm	Peugeot 307 WRC	6:28.5	(Finland) Marcus Grönholm
2. leg (6 Aug)	SS15	Ouninpohja Ita 2	16.55 km	(Finland) Marcus Grönholm	Peugeot 307 WRC	7:45.7	(Finland) Marcus Grönholm
2. leg (6 Aug)	SS16	Moksi — Leustu	40.96 km	(Finland) Marcus Grönholm	Peugeot 307 WRC	20:16.5	(Finland) Marcus Grönholm
2. leg (6 Aug)	SS17	Himos	12.90 km	(Finland) Toni Gardemeister	Ford Focus RS WRC '04	6:59.3	(Finland) Marcus Grönholm
3. leg (7 Aug)	SS18	Kuohu 1	7.80 km	(Finland) Toni Gardemeister	Ford Focus RS WRC '04	3:44.4	(Finland) Marcus Grönholm
3. leg (7 Aug)	SS19	Kruununperä 1	25.48 km	(France) Sébastien Loeb	Citroën Xsara WRC	11:53.2	(Finland) Marcus Grönholm
3. leg (7 Aug)	SS20	Kuohu 2	7.80 km	(Finland) Mikko Hirvonen	Ford Focus RS WRC '04	3:43.1	(Finland) Marcus Grönholm
3. leg (7 Aug)	SS21	Kruununperä 2	25.48 km	(Norway) Petter Solberg	Subaru Impreza S11 WRC '05	11:58.1	(Finland) Marcus Grönholm

==== Championship standings ====
Pos.	Drivers' championships			Co-drivers' championships			Manufacturers' championships		
Pos.	Move	Driver	Points	Move	Co-driver	Points	Move	Manufacturer	Points
1		(France) Sébastien Loeb	83		(Monaco) Daniel Elena	83	1	(France) Marlboro Peugeot Total	106
2	1	(Finland) Marcus Grönholm	55	1	(Finland) Timo Rautiainen	55	1	(France) Citroën Total WRT	105
3	1	(Norway) Petter Solberg	53	1	(United Kingdom) Phil Mills	53		(United Kingdom) BP Ford World Rally Team	69
4	1	(Estonia) Markko Märtin	48	1	(United Kingdom) Michael Park	48		(Japan) Subaru World Rally Team	59
5	1	(Finland) Toni Gardemeister	47	1	(Finland) Jakke Honkanen	47		(Japan) Mitsubishi Motors	43

=== Junior World Rally Championship ===
==== Classification ====
Position		No.	Driver	Co-driver	Entrant	Car	Time	Difference	Points
Event	Class	No.	Driver	Co-driver	Entrant	Car	Time	Difference	Points
15	1	41	(Spain) Dani Sordo	(Spain) Marc Martí	(Spain) Dani Sordo	Citroën C2 S1600	3:20:17.8		10
16	2	36	(Estonia) Urmo Aava	(Estonia) Kuldar Sikk	(Estonia) Urmo Aava	Suzuki Ignis S1600	3:21:50.4	+1:32.6	8
18	3	32	(United Kingdom) Guy Wilks	(United Kingdom) Phil Pugh	(United Kingdom) Guy Wilks	Suzuki Swift S1600	3:24:07.7	+3:49.9	6
21	4	38	(Italy) Luca Betti	(Italy) Piercarlo Capolongo	(Italy) Luca Betti	Renault Clio S1600	3:29:54.1	+9:36.3	5
28	5	34	(San Marino) Mirco Baldacci	(Italy) Giovanni Bernacchini	(San Marino) Mirco Baldacci	Fiat Punto S1600	3:41:32.6	+21:14.8	4
36	6	43	(Czech Republic) Martin Prokop	(Czech Republic) Petr Gross	(Czech Republic) Martin Prokop	Suzuki Ignis S1600	3:52:52.5	+32:34.7	3
39	7	35	(United Kingdom) Kris Meeke	(United Kingdom) Glenn Patterson	(United Kingdom) Kris Meeke	Citroën C2 S1600	3:55:07.7	+34:49.9	2
40	8	40	(Zimbabwe) Conrad Rautenbach	(United Kingdom) Carl Williamson	(Zimbabwe) Conrad Rautenbach	Citroën C2 S1600	3:56:54.6	+36:36.8	1
Retired SS19		42	(Czech Republic) Pavel Valoušek	(Italy) Pierangelo Scalvini	(Czech Republic) Pavel Valoušek	Suzuki Ignis S1600	Oil leak		0
Retired SS17		33	(Finland) Kosti Katajamäki	(Finland) Timo Alanne	(Finland) Kosti Katajamäki	Suzuki Ignis S1600	Gearbox		0
Retired SS5		31	(Sweden) Per-Gunnar Andersson	(Sweden) Jonas Andersson	(Sweden) Per-Gunnar Andersson	Suzuki Swift S1600	Accident		0
Retired SS1		37	(Italy) Alan Scorcioni	(San Marino) Silvio Stefanelli	(Italy) Alan Scorcioni	Fiat Punto S1600	Retired		0

==== Special stages ====
Day	Stage	Stage name	Length	Winner	Car	Time	Class leaders
1. leg (4 Aug)	SS1	Killeri 1	2.06 km	(United Kingdom) Kris Meeke	Citroën C2 S1600	1:30.7	(United Kingdom) Kris Meeke
1. leg (5 Aug)	SS2	Lankamaa	24.98 km	(United Kingdom) Kris Meeke	Citroën C2 S1600	13:43.2	(United Kingdom) Kris Meeke
1. leg (5 Aug)	SS3	Laukaa	11.82 km	(United Kingdom) Kris Meeke	Citroën C2 S1600	6:30.7	(United Kingdom) Kris Meeke
1. leg (5 Aug)	SS4	Ruuhimäki	7.57 km	(United Kingdom) Kris Meeke	Citroën C2 S1600	4:31.7	(United Kingdom) Kris Meeke
1. leg (5 Aug)	SS5	Vellipohja 1	33.93 km	(United Kingdom) Kris Meeke	Citroën C2 S1600	19:18.8	(United Kingdom) Kris Meeke
1. leg (5 Aug)	SS6	Mökkiperä 1	13.96 km	(Estonia) Urmo Aava	Suzuki Ignis S1600	7:49.3	(United Kingdom) Kris Meeke
1. leg (5 Aug)	SS7	Vellipohja 2	33.93 km	(Spain) Dani Sordo	Citroën C2 S1600	19:21.8	(United Kingdom) Kris Meeke
1. leg (5 Aug)	SS8	Mökkiperä 2	13.96 km	(Spain) Dani Sordo	Citroën C2 S1600	7:43.6	(United Kingdom) Kris Meeke
1. leg (5 Aug)	SS9	Killeri 2	2.06 km	(Spain) Dani Sordo	Citroën C2 S1600	1:29.9	(United Kingdom) Kris Meeke
2. leg (6 Aug)	SS10	Vaheri	19.84 km	(United Kingdom) Guy Wilks	Suzuki Swift S1600	11:00.6	(United Kingdom) Kris Meeke
2. leg (6 Aug)	SS11	Ouninpohja Lansi 1	13.98 km	(Finland) Kosti Katajamäki	Suzuki Ignis S1600	7:18.0	(Spain) Dani Sordo
2. leg (6 Aug)	SS12	Ouninpohja Ita 1	16.55 km	(United Kingdom) Guy Wilks	Suzuki Swift S1600	8:52.1	(Spain) Dani Sordo
2. leg (6 Aug)	SS13	Urria	10.00 km	(Finland) Kosti Katajamäki	Suzuki Ignis S1600	5:14.9	(Spain) Dani Sordo
2. leg (6 Aug)	SS14	Ouninpohja Lansi 2	13.98 km	(United Kingdom) Guy Wilks	Suzuki Swift S1600	7:15.3	(Spain) Dani Sordo
2. leg (6 Aug)	SS15	Ouninpohja Ita 2	16.55 km	(United Kingdom) Guy Wilks	Suzuki Swift S1600	8:45.7	(Spain) Dani Sordo
2. leg (6 Aug)	SS16	Moksi — Leustu	40.96 km	(United Kingdom) Guy Wilks	Suzuki Swift S1600	23:08.8	(Spain) Dani Sordo
2. leg (6 Aug)	SS17	Himos	12.90 km	(United Kingdom) Guy Wilks	Suzuki Swift S1600	7:49.8	(Spain) Dani Sordo
3. leg (7 Aug)	SS18	Kuohu 1	7.80 km	(United Kingdom) Kris Meeke	Citroën C2 S1600	4:12.9	(Spain) Dani Sordo
3. leg (7 Aug)	SS19	Kruununperä 1	25.48 km	(United Kingdom) Guy Wilks	Suzuki Swift S1600	13:38.5	(Spain) Dani Sordo
3. leg (7 Aug)	SS20	Kuohu 2	7.80 km	(United Kingdom) Kris Meeke	Citroën C2 S1600	4:11.4	(Spain) Dani Sordo
3. leg (7 Aug)	SS21	Kruununperä 2	25.48 km	(United Kingdom) Guy Wilks	Suzuki Swift S1600	13:43.4	(Spain) Dani Sordo

==== Championship standings ====
Pos.	Drivers' championships		
Pos.	Move	Driver	Points
1	1	(United Kingdom) Guy Wilks	29
2	2	(Spain) Dani Sordo	25
3	2	(Sweden) Per-Gunnar Andersson	25
4	1	(Estonia) Urmo Aava	22
5	2	(United Kingdom) Kris Meeke	21
