= Conrad Rautenbach =

Zimbabwean rally driver (born 1984)

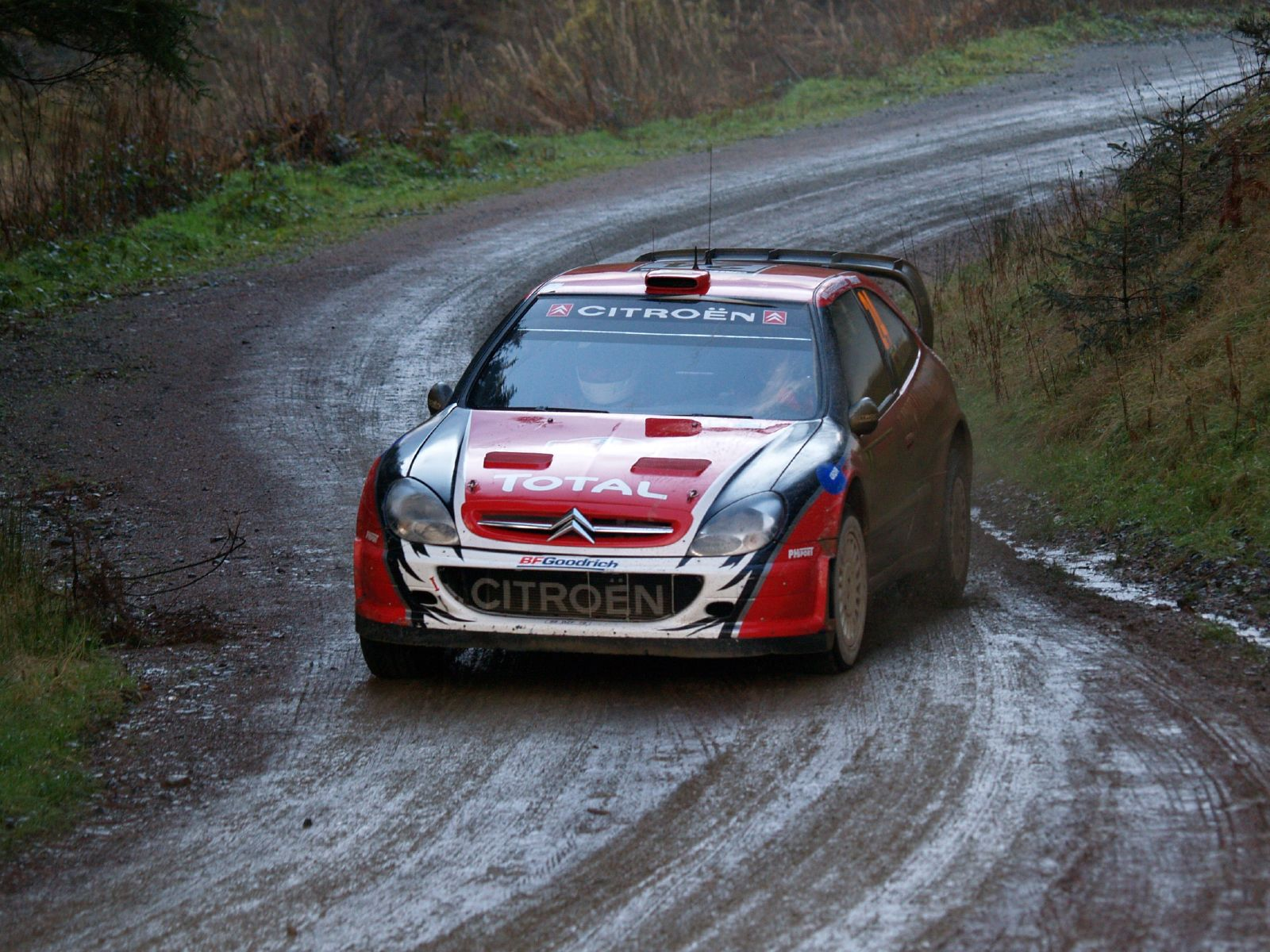
- Rautenbach at the 2007 Rally GB.

Personal information
- Nationality: (Zimbabwe) Zimbabwean
- Born: 12 November 1984 (age 42); Harare, Zimbabwe

World Rally Championship record
- Years active: 2004–2009
- Co-driver: (Zimbabwe) Peter Marsh (United Kingdom) Timothy Sturla (United Kingdom) Mark Jones (United Kingdom) Carl Williamson (United Kingdom) David Senior (United Kingdom) Daniel Barritt
- Teams: Citroën Sport Technologies, Citroën Junior Team
- Rallies: 56
- Championships: 0
- Rally wins: 0
- Podiums: 0
- Total points: 15
- First rally: 2004 Monte Carlo Rally
- Last rally: 2009 Rally GB

Conrad Rautenbach (born 12 November 1984) is a Zimbabwean rally driver who competed in the World Rally Championship for the Citroën Junior Team along with his co-driver Daniel Barritt. He won the African Rally Championship twice, in 2007 and 2011.

== Career ==
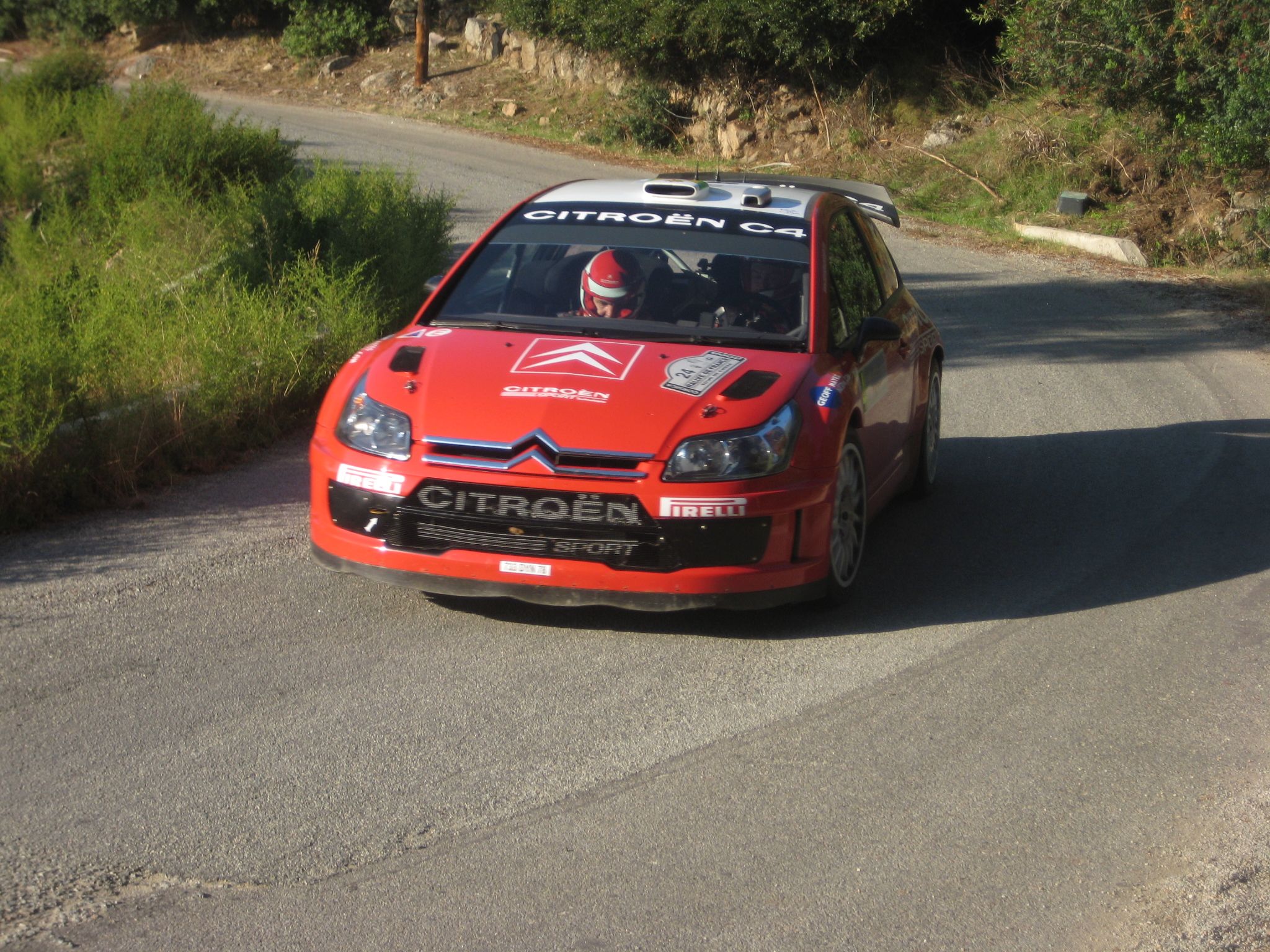
Rautenbach at the 2008 Tour de Corse.

Rautenbach drove for the privately run PH Sport team with Urmo Aava in a Citroën C4 WRC for the 2008 season, where he achieved points finishes on two occasions, an eighth at Rally Turkey and a best result of fourth at the Rally Argentina. However, he also had some bizarre moments in 2008, not least of which the now infamous collision with Sébastien Loeb at the Jordan Rally where both cars managed to collide head-on forcing both to retire instantly.

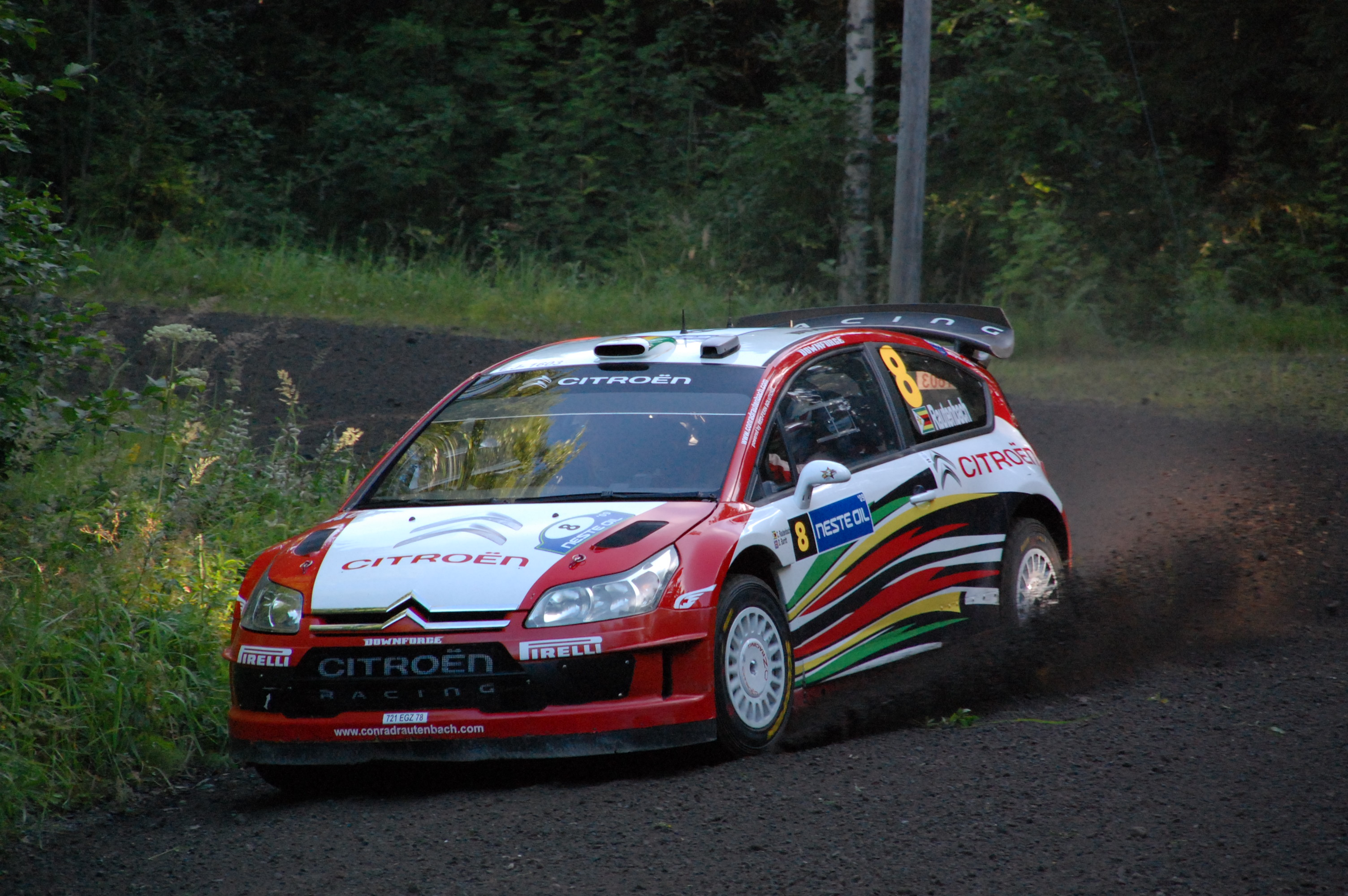
Rautenbach at the 2009 Rally Finland.

For 2009, Rautenbach joined the Citroën Junior Team where he continued to campaign in a Citroën C4 WRC. On Rally Ireland, the first event of the season, Rautenbach had a promising first day, setting stage times consistently in the top-eight, and ended the day in fifth place. However an off early on day two saw him slip down the standings, eventually finishing 18th in the rally. 2009 was also an inconsistent season for Rautenbach, with retirements in Rally Norway, Rally Portugal and Rally Argentina, however, he did achieve points finishes at the Cyprus Rally and the Acropolis Rally, finishing sixth and fifth respectively. He did not get a seat for the next season and has not competed in WRC since.

Due to a lack of funding in 2010, Rautenbach only competed in the South African National Rally Championship with a Ford Fiesta S2000. He returned to the African championship in 2011, winning it for the second time.

Rautenbach's father, Billy Rautenbach, is also a former rally driver.

== WRC results ==
Year	Entrant	Car	1	2	3	4	5	6	7	8	9	10	11	12	13	14	15	16	WDC	Points
2004	Conrad Rautenbach	Ford Puma S1600	MON; Ret	SWE	MEX	NZL	CYP												NC	0
2004	Conrad Rautenbach	Opel Corsa S1600						GRE; Ret	TUR; 22	ARG	FIN; Ret	GER	JPN	GBR; Ret					NC	0
2004	Conrad Rautenbach	Suzuki Ignis S1600													ITA; Ret	FRA			NC	0
2004	Conrad Rautenbach	Citroën Saxo S1600															ESP; 33	AUS	NC	0
2005	Conrad Rautenbach	Citroën Saxo S1600	MON	SWE	MEX; Ret	NZL													NC	0
2005	Conrad Rautenbach	Citroën C2 S1600					ITA; 27	CYP	TUR	GRE; 28	ARG	FIN; 40	GER; Ret	GBR	JPN	FRA; 20	ESP; Ret	AUS	NC	0
2006	Conrad Rautenbach	Renault Clio S1600	MON	SWE	MEX	ESP; 25	FRA; 18	ARG	ITA; 16		GER; 33	FIN; 43	JPN	CYP	TUR; 17	AUS	NZL		NC	0
2006	Conrad Rautenbach	Subaru Impreza WRX STI								GRE; 34								GBR; 64	NC	0
2007	Conrad Rautenbach	Citroën C2 S1600	MON	SWE	NOR	MEX	POR; 34	ARG	ITA; Ret	GRE	FIN; 23	GER; 14	NZL	ESP; 23	FRA; 26	JPN	IRE		NC	0
2007	Conrad Rautenbach	Citroën Xsara WRC																GBR; Ret	NC	0
2008	Conrad Rautenbach	Citroën Xsara WRC	MON; Ret	SWE; 16															15th	6
2008	Conrad Rautenbach	Citroën C4 WRC			MEX; 15	ARG; 4	JOR; 26	ITA; 13	GRE; 10	TUR; 8	FIN; 10	GER; 13	NZL; Ret	ESP; Ret	FRA; 14	JPN; Ret	GBR; 15		15th	6
2009	Citroën Junior Team	Citroën C4 WRC	IRE; 18	NOR; Ret	CYP; 6	POR; Ret	ARG; Ret	ITA; Ret	GRE; 5	POL; 8	FIN; Ret	AUS; Ret	ESP; 11	GBR; 8					10th	9

=== JWRC results ===
Year	Entrant	Car	1	2	3	4	5	6	7	8	9	Pos.	Points
2004	Conrad Rautenbach	Ford Puma S1600	MON; Ret									17th	2
2004	Conrad Rautenbach	Opel Corsa S1600		GRE; Ret	TUR; 7	FIN; Ret	GBR; Ret					17th	2
2004	Conrad Rautenbach	Suzuki Ignis S1600						ITA; Ret				17th	2
2004	Conrad Rautenbach	Citroën Saxo S1600							ESP; 11			17th	2
2005	Conrad Rautenbach	Citroën Saxo S1600	MON	MEX; Ret								12th	7
2005	Conrad Rautenbach	Citroën C2 S1600			ITA; 8	GRE; 8	FIN; 8	GER; Ret	FRA; 5	ESP; Ret		12th	7
2006	Conrad Rautenbach	Renault Clio S1600	SWE	ESP; 6	FRA; 3	ARG	ITA; 2	GER; 9	FIN; 11	TUR; 2	GBR	5th	25
2007	Conrad Rautenbach	Citroën C2 S1600	NOR	POR; 10	ITA; Ret	FIN; 4	GER; 3	ESP; 5	FRA; 8			8th	16

== Dakar Rally results ==
Year	Class	Vehicle	Position	Stages won
2017	Cars	(Japan) Toyota	9th	0
2020	UTV	(France) PH-Sport	4th	0

Sporting positions
Preceded by Patrick Emontspool	African Rally Champion; 2007	Succeeded by Hideaki Miyoshi
Preceded by James Whyte	African Rally Champion; 2011	Succeeded by Mohamed Essa
