= Pavel Valoušek =

Czech rally driver (born 1979)

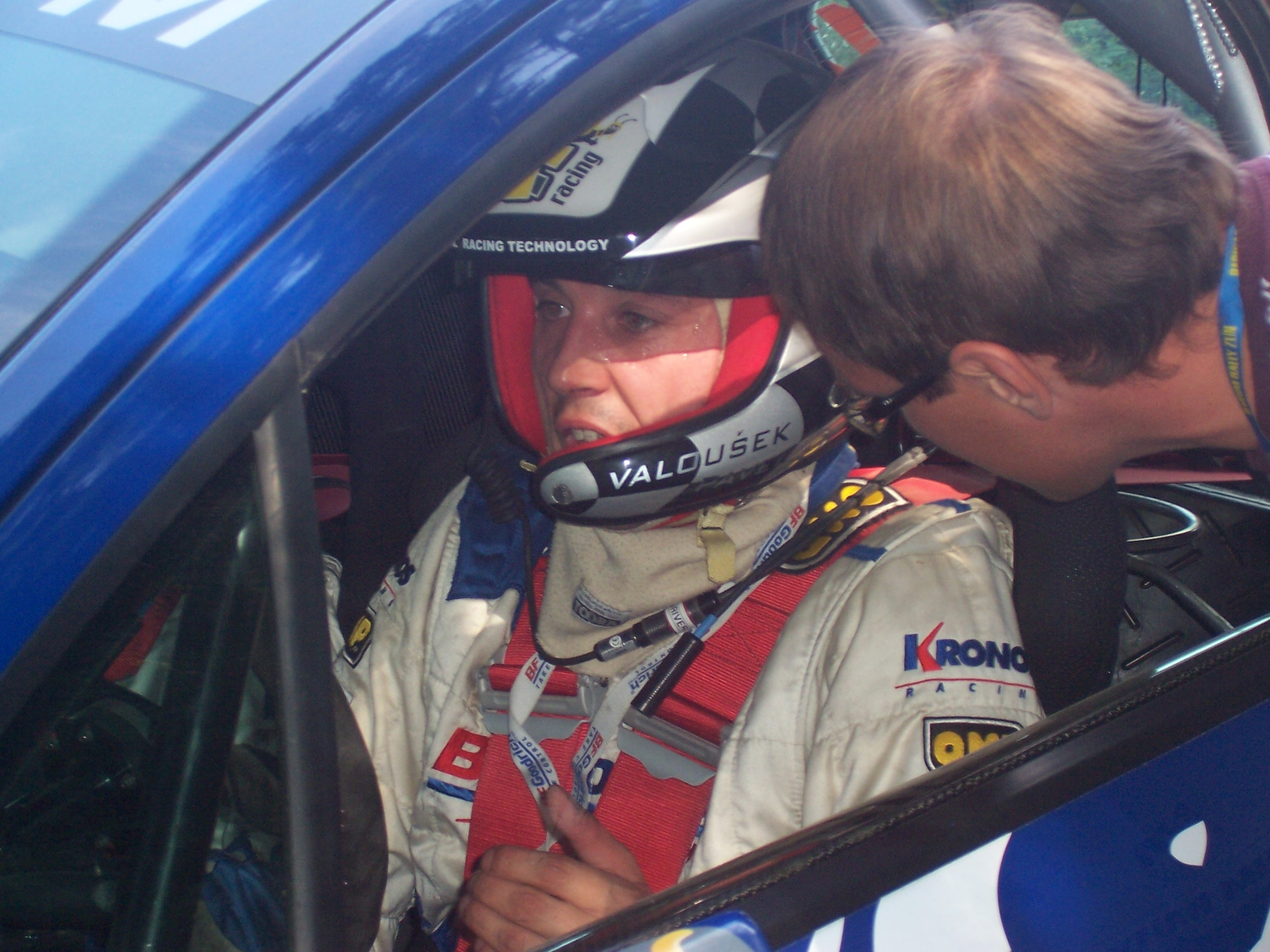
- Nationality: (Czech Republic) Czech
- Born: 19 April 1979 (age 47) Otrokovice, Czechoslovakia

Czech Rally Championship career
- Debut season: 1999
- Current team: Škoda Delimax Czech National Team
- Co-driver: Zdeněk Hrůza
- Former teams: BF Goodrich Drivers Team
- Best finish: 1st in Sheron Valašská Rally

Championship titles
- 2010 2016: Czech Rally Championship; Slovak Rally Championship

Pavel Valoušek (born 19 April 1979) is a Czech professional rally driver who currently competes in the Czech Rally Championship with Škoda Fabia S2000 in factory supported team.

== Career ==
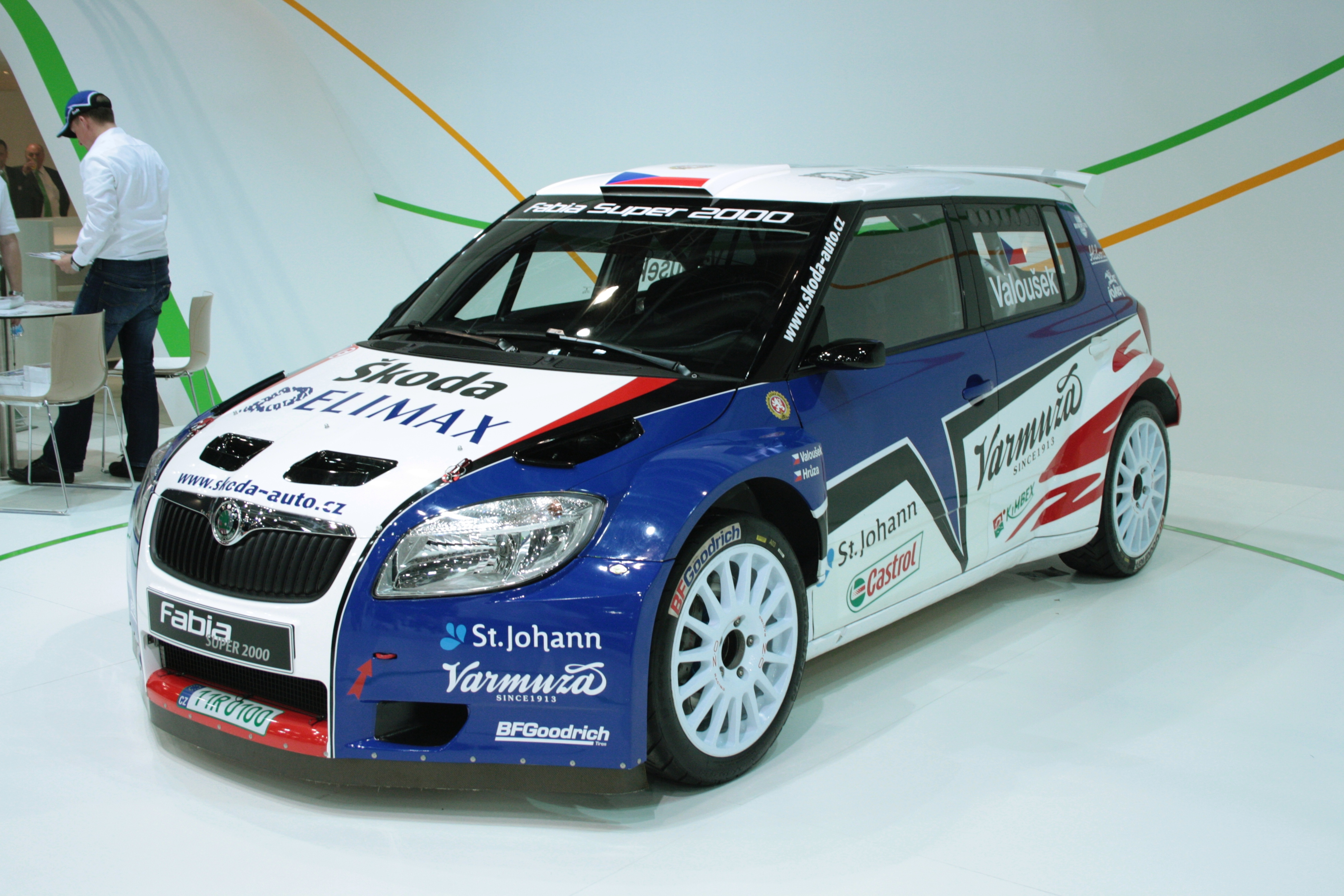
Valoušek's Škoda Fabia S2000 on Brno Autotec Show

Valoušek was racing with Suzuki Ignis S1600 in 2005 JWRC and scored 10 points overally finishing 11th, his best result this year was 4th place in JWRC standings at Rally Mexico.

Valoušek continued racing in JWRC during 2006 season. He managed to get on JWRC podium this year with 3rd place at Rallye Deutschland. Valoušek scored 11 points this year and 15th place in JWRC standings.

Valoušek returned to Czech Rally Championship since 2007. He was racing with Mitsubishi Lancer Evo IX. In 2008, he was chosen by Czech journalists to join BF Goodrich Drivers Team for Barum Rally Zlín, 6th round of IRC 2008. Valoušek finished 4th, being beat by Freddy Loix, Nicolas Vouilloz and Bryan Bouffier all driving Peugeot 207 S2000.

In season 2009 of Czech Rally Championship, Valoušek was again racing with Mitsubishi Lancer Evo IX. For Barum Rally Zlín he switched to Škoda Fabia S2000 and finished 6th overally.

In season 2010, Valoušek was racing with Škoda Fabia S2000 for factory supported rally team. He became Czech champion after winning 3 events out of 7. He managed to get on podium in IRC event. At 2010 Barum Czech Rally Zlín, he finished 3rd after Freddy Loix and Juho Hanninen both at Škoda Fabia S2000.

== WRC ==
Year	Entrant	Car	1	2	3	4	5	6	7	8	9	10	11	12	13	14	15	16	WDC	Points
2002	Jolly Club	Mitsubishi Lancer Evo VI	MON	SWE; Ret	FRA	ESP		ARG; Ret	GRE	KEN		GER	ITA	NZL	AUS	GBR			-	0
2002	Jolly Club	Mitsubishi Lancer Evo VII					CYP; Ret				FIN; Ret								-	0
2004	Pavel Valoušek	Suzuki Ignis S1600	MON	SWE	MEX	NZL	CYP	GRE	TUR	ARG	FIN	GER	JPN	GBR	ITA	FRA	ESP; Ret	AUS	-	0
2005	Pavel Valoušek	Suzuki Ignis S1600	MON; 20	SWE	MEX; 19	NZL	ITA; 28	CYP	TUR	GRE	ARG	FIN; Ret	GER; 23	GBR	JPN	FRA; Ret	ESP; 23	AUS	-	0
2006	Pavel Valoušek	Suzuki Swift S1600	MON	SWE; 25	MEX	ESP	FRA; Ret	ARG	ITA; 48	GRE	GER; 19	FIN; 48	JPN	CYP	TUR; 32	AUS	NZL	GBR	-	0

=== PWRC results ===
Year	Entrant	Car	1	2	3	4	5	6	7	8	9	PWRC	Points
2002	Jolly Club	Mitsubishi Lancer Evo VI	SWE; Ret	FRA		ARG; Ret	GRE	KEN		NZL	AUS	-	0
2002	Jolly Club	Mitsubishi Lancer Evo VII			CYP; Ret				FIN; Ret			-	0

=== JWRC results ===
Year	Entrant	Car	1	2	3	4	5	6	7	8	9	JWRC	Points
2005	Pavel Valoušek	Suzuki Ignis S1600	MON; 8	MEX; 4	ITA; 9	GRE	FIN; Ret	GER; 8	FRA; Ret	ESP; 5		11th	10
2006	Pavel Valoušek	Suzuki Swift S1600	SWE; 4	ESP	FRA; Ret	ARG	ITA; 14	GER; 3	FIN; 12	TUR; 13	GBR	15th	11

== IRC results ==
Year	Entrant	Car	1	2	3	4	5	6	7	8	9	10	11	12	13	WDC	Points
2008	(France) BF Goodrich Drivers Team	Peugeot 207 S2000	TUR	POR	BEL	RUS	POR	CZE; 4	ESP	ITA	SWI	CHI				15th	5
2009	(Czech Republic) Delimax Team	Škoda Fabia S2000	MON	BRA	KEN	POR	BEL	RUS	POR	CZE; 6	ESP	ITA	SCO			28th	3
2010	(Czech Republic) Škoda Delimax Czech National Team	Škoda Fabia S2000	MON	BRA	ARG	CAN	ITA	BEL	AZO	MAD	CZE; 3	ITA	SCO	CYP		14th	6
2011	(Czech Republic) Peugeot Delimax Total Team	Peugeot 207 S2000	MON	CAN	FRA	UKR	BEL	AZO	MAD	CZE; Ret	HUN	ITA	SCO	CYP		–	0
2012	(Czech Republic) Peugeot Delimax Total Team	Peugeot 207 S2000	AZO	CAN	IRL	COR	ITA	YPR	SMR	ROM	ZLI; Ret	YAL	SLI	SAN	CYP	–	0

== ERC results ==
Year	Entrant	Car	1	2	3	4	5	6	7	8	9	10	11	12	WDC	Points
2012	(Czech Republic) Peugeot Delimax Total Team	Peugeot 207 S2000	JÄN; 6	MIL	CRO	BUL	YPR	BOS	MAD	CZE; Ret	AST	POL	VAL			
2013	(Czech Republic) Delimax Czech National Team	Peugeot 207 S2000	JÄN; 10	LIE	CAN	AZO	COR	YPR	ROM						30th*	13*
2013	(Czech Republic) Delimax Team	Ford Fiesta R5								CZE; 8	POL	CRO	SAN	VAL	30th*	13*

== Czech Rally Championship results ==
Year	Entrant	Car	1	2	3	4	5	6	7	8	9	MMČR	Points
2000	Samohýl Motorsport	Honda Civic VTi	ŠUM; 40	LIB; Ret	KRU; Ret	BOH; 33	BAR; 25	PŘÍ; 23				-	0
2001	AK Barum	Škoda Felicia Kit Car	ŠUM; 25	VAL; 31	KRU; 23	BOH; Ret						-	0
2001	AK Barum	Mitsubishi Lancer Evo III					BAR; 20	PŘÍ	TŘE			-	0
2003	Barum Rally Team	Toyota Corolla WRC	ŠUM; 17	VAL; Ret	KRU; 2	BOH; 2	BAR	PŘÍ	TŘE			10th	48
2004	Barum Rally Team	Toyota Corolla WRC	JÄN; Ret	ŠUM								36th	3
2004	Trumf Rally Team	Toyota Corolla WRC					BOH; Ret					36th	3
2004	Trumf Rally Team	Suzuki Ignis S1600						BAR; 17	PŘÍ	TŘE		36th	3
2004	Suzuki Motoršport	Suzuki Ignis S1600			TAT; 13	KRU						36th	3
2005	Trumf Rally Team	Suzuki Ignis S1600	JÄN; Ret	ŠUM; 18	VAL	TAT	KRU	BOH; 14	BAR; 10	PŘÍ; Ret	TŘE	33rd	8
2006	Trumf Rally Team	Suzuki Ignis S1600	JÄN; 9	ŠUM; Ret	TAT	KRU	BOH					30th	7
2006	Pavel Valoušek	Citroën C2 S1600						BAR; Ret	TŘE	PŘÍ		30th	7
2007	Pavel Valoušek	Mitsubishi Lancer Evo VIII	JÄN; 3	ŠUM; Ret								14th	19
2007	NTS Plzeň - Gassner Rallisport	Mitsubishi Lancer Evo IX			KRU; Ret	BOH	HOR	BAR	PŘÍ			14th	19
2008	Pavel Valoušek	Mitsubishi Lancer Evo IX	JÄN; 2	VAL; 3	ŠUM; 3	KRU	HUS; Ret	TŘE	BOH; 2		PŘÍ; Ret	3rd	188
2008	BF Goodrich Drivers Team	Peugeot 207 S2000								BAR; 4		3rd	188
2009	Czech National Team	Mitsubishi Lancer Evo IX	VAL; 6	ŠUM; 3	KRU; 4	HUS; 3						4th	103
2009	Defrs Rally Team	Mitsubishi Lancer Evo IX						PŘÍ; Ret	BOH			4th	103
2009	Delimax Team	Škoda Fabia S2000					BAR; 5					4th	103
2010	Škoda Delimax Czech National Team	Škoda Fabia S2000	VAL; 1	ŠUM; 1	KRU; 3	HUS; 2	BOH; Ret	BAR; 1	PŘÍ; 2			1st	250
2011	Peugeot Delimax Total Team	Peugeot 207 S2000	VAL; 3	ŠUM -	KRU; 2	HUS; Ret	BOH; 1	BAR; Ret	PŘÍ			4th	116
2012	Peugeot Delimax Total Team	Peugeot 207 S2000	JÄN; 3	VAL; 5	ŠUM	KRU; Ret	HUS; 4	BOH -	BAR; Ret	PŘÍ; Ret		6th	74
2013	Delimax Czech National Team	Peugeot 207 S2000	JÄN; 5	ŠUM	KRU	HUS	BOH					12th	35
2013	Delimax Team	Ford Fiesta R5						BAR; 7	PŘÍ			12th	35
2014	CMM-Media sport	Škoda Fabia S2000	JÄN	KRU	ŠUM	HUS	BOH	BAR; Ret	PŘÍ			-	0
2015	Comorant Team	Škoda Fabia S2000	ŠUM; 2	KRU; 3	HUS; 4	BOH; 4	BAR; 3	KLA				3rd	245
2016	Energy Oil Motorsport	Škoda Fabia R5	ŠUM; 3	KRU	HUS; 2	BOH	BAR; 4	PŘÍ				6th	129
2017	Icari Rally Team	Ford Fiesta R5	VAL	ŠUM	KRU	HUS; 4	BOH					11th	75
2017	Icari Rally Team	Škoda Fabia R5						BAR; 4	PŘÍ			11th	75
