= 2005 Rallye Deutschland =

11th round of the 2005 World Rally Championship

2005 Rallye Deutschland 24th OMV ADAC Rallye Deutschland
Round 11 of the 2005 World Rally Championship season
← Previous event	Next event →
- Host country: Germany
- Rally base: Trier
- Dates run: August 26, 2005 – August 28, 2005
- Stages: 19 (356.16 km; 221.31 miles)
- Stage surface: Asphalt
- Overall distance: 1,298.25 km (806.70 miles)

Statistics
- Crews: 57 at start, 38 at finish

Overall results
- Overall winner: (France) Sébastien Loeb (Monaco) Daniel Elena (France) Citroën Total WRT; Citroën Xsara WRC

The 2005 Rallye Deutschland (formally the 24th OMV ADAC Rallye Deutschland) was the eleventh round of the 2005 World Rally Championship. The rally was held over three days between 26 August and 28 August 2005, and was won by Citroën's Sébastien Loeb, his 18th win in the World Rally Championship.

== Background ==
=== Entry list ===
No.	Driver	Co-Driver	Entrant	Car	Tyre
World Rally Championship manufacturer entries
1	(France) Sébastien Loeb	(Monaco) Daniel Elena	(France) Citroën Total WRT	Citroën Xsara WRC	MI
2	(Belgium) François Duval	(Belgium) Sven Smeets	(France) Citroën Total WRT	Citroën Xsara WRC	MI
3	(Finland) Toni Gardemeister	(Finland) Jakke Honkanen	(United Kingdom) BP Ford World Rally Team	Ford Focus RS WRC '04	MI
4	(Czech Republic) Roman Kresta	(Czech Republic) Jan Tománek	(United Kingdom) BP Ford World Rally Team	Ford Focus RS WRC '04	MI
5	(Norway) Petter Solberg	(United Kingdom) Phil Mills	(Japan) Subaru World Rally Team	Subaru Impreza S11 WRC '05	P
6	(France) Stéphane Sarrazin	(France) Denis Giraudet	(Japan) Subaru World Rally Team	Subaru Impreza S11 WRC '05	P
7	(Finland) Marcus Grönholm	(Finland) Timo Rautiainen	(France) Marlboro Peugeot Total	Peugeot 307 WRC	P
8	(Estonia) Markko Märtin	(United Kingdom) Michael Park	(France) Marlboro Peugeot Total	Peugeot 307 WRC	P
9	(Finland) Harri Rovanperä	(Finland) Risto Pietiläinen	(Japan) Mitsubishi Motors	Mitsubishi Lancer WRC 05	P
10	(Italy) Gianluigi Galli	(Italy) Guido D'Amore	(Japan) Mitsubishi Motors	Mitsubishi Lancer WRC 05	P
11	(Germany) Armin Schwarz	(Germany) Klaus Wicha	(Czech Republic) Škoda Motorsport	Škoda Fabia WRC	MI
12	(France) Alexandre Bengué	(France) Caroline Escudero-Bengué	(Czech Republic) Škoda Motorsport	Škoda Fabia WRC	MI
World Rally Championship entries
14	(Spain) Daniel Solà	(Spain) Xavier Amigò	(United Kingdom) BP Ford World Rally Team	Ford Focus RS WRC '04	MI
15	(Australia) Chris Atkinson	(Australia) Glenn Macneall	(Japan) Subaru World Rally Team	Subaru Impreza S11 WRC '05	P
16	(Czech Republic) Jan Kopecký	(Czech Republic) Filip Schovánek	(Czech Republic) Škoda Motorsport	Škoda Fabia WRC	MI
18	(Austria) Manfred Stohl	(Austria) Ilka Minor	(Belgium) OMV World Rally Team	Citroën Xsara WRC	MI
19	(Spain) Xavier Pons	(Spain) Carlos del Barrio	(Belgium) OMV World Rally Team	Citroën Xsara WRC	MI
20	(France) Nicolas Bernardi	(Belgium) Jean-Marc Fortin	Equipe de France FFSA	Peugeot 206 WRC	MI
20	(Czech Republic) Štěpán Vojtěch	(Czech Republic) Michal Ernst	(Czech Republic) Štěpán Vojtěch	Peugeot 206 WRC	MI
JWRC entries
31	(Sweden) Per-Gunnar Andersson	(Sweden) Jonas Andersson	(Sweden) Per-Gunnar Andersson	Suzuki Swift S1600	P
32	(United Kingdom) Guy Wilks	(United Kingdom) Phil Pugh	(United Kingdom) Guy Wilks	Suzuki Swift S1600	P
33	(Finland) Kosti Katajamäki	(Finland) Timo Alanne	(Finland) Kosti Katajamäki	Suzuki Ignis S1600	P
34	(San Marino) Mirco Baldacci	(Italy) Giovanni Bernacchini	(San Marino) Mirco Baldacci	Fiat Punto S1600	P
35	(United Kingdom) Kris Meeke	(United Kingdom) Glenn Patterson	(United Kingdom) Kris Meeke	Citroën C2 S1600	P
36	(Estonia) Urmo Aava	(Estonia) Kuldar Sikk	(Estonia) Urmo Aava	Suzuki Ignis S1600	P
37	(Italy) Alan Scorcioni	(Italy) Moreno Toni	(Italy) Alan Scorcioni	Fiat Punto S1600	P
38	(Italy) Luca Betti	(Italy) Giovanni Agnese	(Italy) Luca Betti	Renault Clio S1600	P
40	(Zimbabwe) Conrad Rautenbach	(United Kingdom) Carl Williamson	(Zimbabwe) Conrad Rautenbach	Citroën C2 S1600	P
41	(Spain) Dani Sordo	(Spain) Marc Martí	(Spain) Dani Sordo	Citroën C2 S1600	P
42	(Czech Republic) Pavel Valoušek	(Italy) Pierangelo Scalvini	(Czech Republic) Pavel Valoušek	Suzuki Ignis S1600	P
43	(Czech Republic) Martin Prokop	(Czech Republic) Petr Gross	(Czech Republic) Martin Prokop	Suzuki Ignis S1600	P

=== Itinerary ===
All dates and times are CEST (UTC+2).

Date	Time	No.	Stage name	Distance
1. leg — 119.34 km
26 August	09:53	SS1	Ruwertal / Fell 1	26.60 km
26 August	10:51	SS2	Dhrontal 1	12.60 km
26 August	11:49	SS3	Schönes Moselland 1	20.47 km
26 August	14:57	SS4	Ruwertal / Fell 2	26.60 km
26 August	15:55	SS5	Dhrontal 2	12.60 km
26 August	16:53	SS6	Schönes Moselland 2	20.47 km
2. leg — 146.77 km
27 August	08:36	SS7	Bosenberg 1	22.50 km
27 August	09:44	SS8	Panzerplatte 1	29.56 km
27 August	12:19	SS9	Erzweiler 1	18.21 km
27 August	12:57	SS10	Panzerplatte 2	29.56 km
27 August	15:32	SS11	Erzweiler 2	18.21 km
27 August	16:35	SS12	Bosenberg 2	22.50 km
27 August	17:23	SS13	St. Wendel 1	6.23 km
3. leg — 90.05 km
28 August	08:18	SS14	St. Wendeler Land 1	16.37 km
28 August	08:51	SS15	Freisen / Westrich 1	18.70 km
28 August	09:34	SS16	Birkenfelder Land	13.68 km
28 August	11:22	SS17	St. Wendeler Land 2	16.37 km
28 August	11:55	SS18	Freisen / Westrich 2	18.70 km
28 August	12:50	SS19	St. Wendel 2	6.23 km

== Results ==
=== Overall ===
Pos.	No.	Driver	Co-driver	Team	Car	Time	Difference	Points
1	1	(France) Sébastien Loeb	(Monaco) Daniel Elena	(France) Citroën Total WRT	Citroën Xsara WRC	3:27:13.2		10
2	2	(Belgium) François Duval	(Belgium) Sven Smeets	(France) Citroën Total WRT	Citroën Xsara WRC	3:27:50.6	+37.4	8
3	7	(Finland) Marcus Grönholm	(Finland) Timo Rautiainen	(France) Marlboro Peugeot Total	Peugeot 307 WRC	3:29:18.0	+2:04.8	6
4	8	(Estonia) Markko Märtin	(United Kingdom) Michael Park	(France) Marlboro Peugeot Total	Peugeot 307 WRC	3:31:22.6	+4:09.4	5
5	10	(Italy) Gianluigi Galli	(Italy) Guido D'Amore	(Japan) Mitsubishi Motors	Mitsubishi Lancer WRC 05	3:32:16.8	+5:03.6	4
6	4	(Czech Republic) Roman Kresta	(Czech Republic) Jan Tománek	(United Kingdom) BP Ford World Rally Team	Ford Focus RS WRC '04	3:32:25.5	+5:12.3	3
7	5	(Norway) Petter Solberg	(United Kingdom) Phil Mills	(Japan) Subaru World Rally Team	Subaru Impreza S11 WRC '05	3:35:01.3	+7:48.1	2
8	6	(France) Stéphane Sarrazin	(France) Denis Giraudet	(Japan) Subaru World Rally Team	Subaru Impreza S11 WRC '05	3:35:47.3	+8:34.1	1

=== World Rally Cars ===
==== Classification ====
Position		No.	Driver	Co-driver	Entrant	Car	Time	Difference	Points
Event	Class	No.	Driver	Co-driver	Entrant	Car	Time	Difference	Points
1	1	1	(France) Sébastien Loeb	(Monaco) Daniel Elena	(France) Citroën Total WRT	Citroën Xsara WRC	3:27:13.2		10
2	2	2	(Belgium) François Duval	(Belgium) Sven Smeets	(France) Citroën Total WRT	Citroën Xsara WRC	3:27:50.6	+37.4	8
3	3	7	(Finland) Marcus Grönholm	(Finland) Timo Rautiainen	(France) Marlboro Peugeot Total	Peugeot 307 WRC	3:29:18.0	+2:04.8	6
4	4	8	(Estonia) Markko Märtin	(United Kingdom) Michael Park	(France) Marlboro Peugeot Total	Peugeot 307 WRC	3:31:22.6	+4:09.4	5
5	5	10	(Italy) Gianluigi Galli	(Italy) Guido D'Amore	(Japan) Mitsubishi Motors	Mitsubishi Lancer WRC 05	3:32:16.8	+5:03.6	4
6	6	4	(Czech Republic) Roman Kresta	(Czech Republic) Jan Tománek	(United Kingdom) BP Ford World Rally Team	Ford Focus RS WRC '04	3:32:25.5	+5:12.3	3
7	7	5	(Norway) Petter Solberg	(United Kingdom) Phil Mills	(Japan) Subaru World Rally Team	Subaru Impreza S11 WRC '05	3:35:01.3	+7:48.1	2
8	8	6	(France) Stéphane Sarrazin	(France) Denis Giraudet	(Japan) Subaru World Rally Team	Subaru Impreza S11 WRC '05	3:35:47.3	+8:34.1	1
10	9	9	(Finland) Harri Rovanperä	(Finland) Risto Pietiläinen	(Japan) Mitsubishi Motors	Mitsubishi Lancer WRC 05	3:36:24.8	+9:11.6	0
17	10	3	(Finland) Toni Gardemeister	(Finland) Jakke Honkanen	(United Kingdom) BP Ford World Rally Team	Ford Focus RS WRC '04	3:52:50.2	+25:37.0	0
Retired SS9		11	(Germany) Armin Schwarz	(Germany) Klaus Wicha	(Czech Republic) Škoda Motorsport	Škoda Fabia WRC	Mechanical		0
Retired SS3		12	(France) Alexandre Bengué	(France) Caroline Escudero-Bengué	(Czech Republic) Škoda Motorsport	Škoda Fabia WRC	Mechanical		0

==== Special stages ====
Day	Stage	Stage name	Length	Winner	Car	Time	Class leaders
1. leg (26 Aug)	SS1	Ruwertal / Fell 1	26.60 km	(France) Sébastien Loeb	Citroën Xsara WRC	15:37.5	(France) Sébastien Loeb
1. leg (26 Aug)	SS2	Dhrontal 1	12.60 km	(France) Sébastien Loeb	Citroën Xsara WRC	7:50.3	(France) Sébastien Loeb
1. leg (26 Aug)	SS3	Schönes Moselland 1	20.47 km	(Belgium) François Duval	Citroën Xsara WRC	11:48.6	(Belgium) François Duval
1. leg (26 Aug)	SS4	Ruwertal / Fell 2	26.60 km	(France) Sébastien Loeb	Citroën Xsara WRC	15:13.5	(France) Sébastien Loeb
1. leg (26 Aug)	SS5	Dhrontal 2	12.60 km	(France) Sébastien Loeb	Citroën Xsara WRC	7:38.5	(France) Sébastien Loeb
1. leg (26 Aug)	SS6	Schönes Moselland 2	20.47 km	(France) Sébastien Loeb	Citroën Xsara WRC	11:39.1	(France) Sébastien Loeb
2. leg (27 Aug)	SS7	Bosenberg 1	22.50 km	(France) Sébastien Loeb	Citroën Xsara WRC	12:29.8	(France) Sébastien Loeb
2. leg (27 Aug)	SS8	Panzerplatte 1	29.56 km	(France) Sébastien Loeb	Citroën Xsara WRC	17:17.0	(France) Sébastien Loeb
2. leg (27 Aug)	SS9	Erzweiler 1	18.21 km	(France) Sébastien Loeb	Citroën Xsara WRC	11:02.2	(France) Sébastien Loeb
2. leg (27 Aug)	SS10	Panzerplatte 2	29.56 km	(Belgium) François Duval	Citroën Xsara WRC	17:10.0	(France) Sébastien Loeb
2. leg (27 Aug)	SS11	Erzweiler 2	18.21 km	(France) Sébastien Loeb	Citroën Xsara WRC	10:50.5	(France) Sébastien Loeb
2. leg (27 Aug)	SS12	Bosenberg 2	22.50 km	(Belgium) François Duval	Citroën Xsara WRC	12:28.7	(France) Sébastien Loeb
2. leg (27 Aug)	SS13	St. Wendel 1	6.23 km	(France) Sébastien Loeb	Citroën Xsara WRC	3:24.4	(France) Sébastien Loeb
3. leg (28 Aug)	SS14	St. Wendeler Land 1	16.37 km	(France) Sébastien Loeb	Citroën Xsara WRC	8:59.1	(France) Sébastien Loeb
3. leg (28 Aug)	SS15	Freisen / Westrich 1	18.70 km	(France) Sébastien Loeb	Citroën Xsara WRC	11:32.1	(France) Sébastien Loeb
3. leg (28 Aug)	SS16	Birkenfelder Land	13.68 km	(Estonia) Markko Märtin	Peugeot 307 WRC	7:55.6	(France) Sébastien Loeb
3. leg (28 Aug)	SS17	St. Wendeler Land 2	16.37 km	(Italy) Gianluigi Galli	Mitsubishi Lancer WRC 05	8:57.3	(France) Sébastien Loeb
3. leg (28 Aug)	SS18	Freisen / Westrich 2	18.70 km	(Norway) Petter Solberg	Subaru Impreza S11 WRC '05	11:28.9	(France) Sébastien Loeb
3. leg (28 Aug)	SS19	St. Wendel 2	6.23 km	(France) Sébastien Loeb	Citroën Xsara WRC	3:21.9	(France) Sébastien Loeb

==== Championship standings ====
Pos.	Drivers' championships			Co-drivers' championships			Manufacturers' championships		
Pos.	Move	Driver	Points	Move	Co-driver	Points	Move	Manufacturer	Points
1		(France) Sébastien Loeb	93		(Monaco) Daniel Elena	93	1	(France) Citroën Total WRT	123
2		(Finland) Marcus Grönholm	61		(Finland) Timo Rautiainen	61	1	(France) Marlboro Peugeot Total	117
3		(Norway) Petter Solberg	55		(United Kingdom) Phil Mills	55		(United Kingdom) BP Ford World Rally Team	72
4		(Estonia) Markko Märtin	53		(United Kingdom) Michael Park	53		(Japan) Subaru World Rally Team	62
5		(Finland) Toni Gardemeister	47		(Finland) Jakke Honkanen	47		(Japan) Mitsubishi Motors	47

=== Junior World Rally Championship ===
==== Classification ====
Position		No.	Driver	Co-driver	Entrant	Car	Time	Difference	Points
Event	Class	No.	Driver	Co-driver	Entrant	Car	Time	Difference	Points
13	1	41	(Spain) Dani Sordo	(Spain) Marc Martí	(Spain) Dani Sordo	Citroën C2 S1600	3:46:59.3		10
14	2	35	(United Kingdom) Kris Meeke	(United Kingdom) Glenn Patterson	(United Kingdom) Kris Meeke	Citroën C2 S1600	3:48:24.2	+1:24.9	8
15	3	32	(United Kingdom) Guy Wilks	(United Kingdom) Phil Pugh	(United Kingdom) Guy Wilks	Suzuki Swift S1600	3:50:53.9	+3:54.6	6
16	4	31	(Sweden) Per-Gunnar Andersson	(Sweden) Jonas Andersson	(Sweden) Per-Gunnar Andersson	Suzuki Swift S1600	3:51:44.1	+4:44.8	5
19	5	33	(Finland) Kosti Katajamäki	(Finland) Timo Alanne	(Finland) Kosti Katajamäki	Suzuki Ignis S1600	3:53:07.7	+6:08.4	4
20	6	38	(Italy) Luca Betti	(Italy) Giovanni Agnese	(Italy) Luca Betti	Renault Clio S1600	3:57:20.3	+10:21.0	3
22	7	34	(San Marino) Mirco Baldacci	(Italy) Giovanni Bernacchini	(San Marino) Mirco Baldacci	Fiat Punto S1600	3:59:03.8	+12:04.5	2
23	8	42	(Czech Republic) Pavel Valoušek	(Italy) Pierangelo Scalvini	(Czech Republic) Pavel Valoušek	Suzuki Ignis S1600	4:00:41.8	+13:42.5	1
24	9	39	(Italy) Luca Cecchettini	(Italy) Massimo Daddoveri	(Italy) Luca Cecchettini	Fiat Punto S1600	4:02:04.8	+15:05.5	0
Retired SS11		43	(Czech Republic) Martin Prokop	(Czech Republic) Petr Gross	(Czech Republic) Martin Prokop	Suzuki Ignis S1600	Accident damage		0
Retired SS8		40	(Zimbabwe) Conrad Rautenbach	(United Kingdom) Carl Williamson	(Zimbabwe) Conrad Rautenbach	Citroën C2 S1600	Accident		0
Retired SS7		36	(Estonia) Urmo Aava	(Estonia) Kuldar Sikk	(Estonia) Urmo Aava	Suzuki Ignis S1600	Accident damage		0
Retired SS1		37	(Italy) Alan Scorcioni	(Italy) Moreno Toni	(Italy) Alan Scorcioni	Fiat Punto S1600	Engine		0

==== Special stages ====
Day	Stage	Stage name	Length	Winner	Car	Time	Class leaders
1. leg (26 Aug)	SS1	Ruwertal / Fell 1	26.60 km	(Spain) Dani Sordo	Citroën C2 S1600	17:31.5	(Spain) Dani Sordo
1. leg (26 Aug)	SS2	Dhrontal 1	12.60 km	(Spain) Dani Sordo	Citroën C2 S1600	8:39.8	(Spain) Dani Sordo
1. leg (26 Aug)	SS3	Schönes Moselland 1	20.47 km	(United Kingdom) Kris Meeke	Citroën C2 S1600	13:06.1	(Spain) Dani Sordo
1. leg (26 Aug)	SS4	Ruwertal / Fell 2	26.60 km	(United Kingdom) Kris Meeke	Citroën C2 S1600	16:52.2	(Spain) Dani Sordo
1. leg (26 Aug)	SS5	Dhrontal 2	12.60 km	(Spain) Dani Sordo	Citroën C2 S1600	8:32.1	(Spain) Dani Sordo
1. leg (26 Aug)	SS6	Schönes Moselland 2	20.47 km	(Spain) Dani Sordo	Citroën C2 S1600	12:56.0	(Spain) Dani Sordo
2. leg (27 Aug)	SS7	Bosenberg 1	22.50 km	(Spain) Dani Sordo	Citroën C2 S1600	13:39.0	(Spain) Dani Sordo
2. leg (27 Aug)	SS8	Panzerplatte 1	29.56 km	(United Kingdom) Kris Meeke	Citroën C2 S1600	18:50.8	(Spain) Dani Sordo
2. leg (27 Aug)	SS9	Erzweiler 1	18.21 km	(United Kingdom) Kris Meeke	Citroën C2 S1600	12:03.8	(Spain) Dani Sordo
2. leg (27 Aug)	SS10	Panzerplatte 2	29.56 km	(Spain) Dani Sordo	Citroën C2 S1600	18:30.9	(Spain) Dani Sordo
2. leg (27 Aug)	SS11	Erzweiler 2	18.21 km	(United Kingdom) Guy Wilks	Suzuki Swift S1600	11:53.1	(Spain) Dani Sordo
2. leg (27 Aug)	SS12	Bosenberg 2	22.50 km	(United Kingdom) Kris Meeke	Citroën C2 S1600	13:31.0	(Spain) Dani Sordo
2. leg (27 Aug)	SS13	St. Wendel 1	6.23 km	(United Kingdom) Kris Meeke	Citroën C2 S1600	3:40.9	(Spain) Dani Sordo
3. leg (28 Aug)	SS14	St. Wendeler Land 1	16.37 km	(United Kingdom) Kris Meeke	Citroën C2 S1600	9:37.3	(Spain) Dani Sordo
3. leg (28 Aug)	SS15	Freisen / Westrich 1	18.70 km	(Spain) Dani Sordo	Citroën C2 S1600	12:19.8	(Spain) Dani Sordo
3. leg (28 Aug)	SS16	Birkenfelder Land	13.68 km	(Spain) Dani Sordo	Citroën C2 S1600	8:32.9	(Spain) Dani Sordo
3. leg (28 Aug)	SS17	St. Wendeler Land 2	16.37 km	(United Kingdom) Guy Wilks	Suzuki Swift S1600	9:43.6	(Spain) Dani Sordo
3. leg (28 Aug)	SS18	Freisen / Westrich 2	18.70 km	(United Kingdom) Guy Wilks	Suzuki Swift S1600	12:23.4	(Spain) Dani Sordo
3. leg (28 Aug)	SS19	St. Wendel 2	6.23 km	(United Kingdom) Kris Meeke	Citroën C2 S1600	3:41.3	(Spain) Dani Sordo

==== Championship standings ====
Pos.	Drivers' championships		
Pos.	Move	Driver	Points
1	1	(Spain) Dani Sordo	35
2	1	(United Kingdom) Guy Wilks	35
3		(Sweden) Per-Gunnar Andersson	30
4	1	(United Kingdom) Kris Meeke	29
5	1	(Estonia) Urmo Aava	22
