= 2005 World Rally Championship =

33rd season in the FIA World Rally Championship

Champions
- World Drivers' Champion: Sébastien Loeb
- World Manufacturers' Champion: Citroën

Seasons
- ← 2004 2006 →

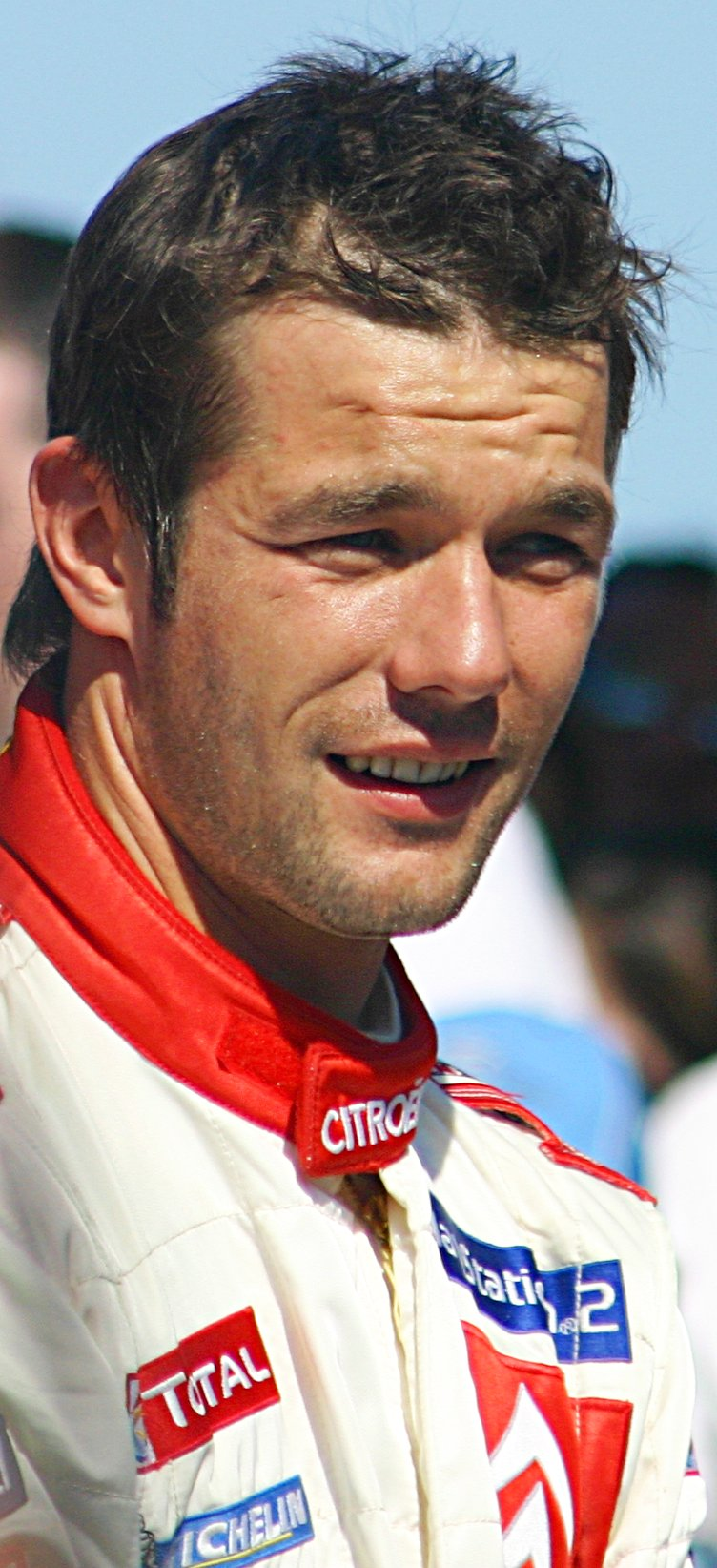
Sébastien Loeb won his second WRC drivers' championship.

The 2005 World Rally Championship was the 33rd season in the FIA World Rally Championship. The season began on January 21 with the Monte-Carlo Rally and ended on November 13 with the Rally Australia.

In the drivers' world championship, Citroën Total's Sébastien Loeb successfully defended his title, finishing a record 56 points ahead of Subaru's Petter Solberg and Peugeot's Marcus Grönholm. Loeb also set several other records during the season. He won ten world rallies, beating the previous record of six held by him (2004) and Didier Auriol (1992). He also took six consecutive wins, beating Timo Salonen's 20-year-old record of four. Peugeot's Markko Märtin retired after his co-driver Michael Park was fatally injured in their crash at the Wales Rally GB.

Citroën took the manufacturers' title for the third year in a row, well ahead of Subaru and Ford. PSA Peugeot Citroën still went ahead with their plan to withdraw both Citroën and Peugeot from the series at the end of the season – although Citroën's departure later became a sabbatical as they spent the following year developing a new car for 2007. More blows to manufacturer involvement in the series followed when Mitsubishi and Škoda announced the withdrawal of their factory teams. However, the 2006 season would see Citroën and Škoda continue as the semi-works teams Kronos Citroën and Red Bull Škoda Team, respectively.

The video game WRC: Rally Evolved was based on this season.

== Regulation changes ==
Drivers' and co-drivers' helmets are now required to be equipped with a HANS device.

== Calendar ==
The 2005 championship was contested over fourteen rounds in Europe, Asia, North America, South America and Oceania.

Rd.	Start date	Finish date	Rally	Rally headquarters	Surface	Stages	Distance	Support class
1	21 January	23 January	(Monaco) 73rd Rallye Automobile Monte-Carlo	Monte Carlo	Mixed	15	353.07 km	JWRC
2	11 February	13 February	(Sweden) 54th Uddeholm Swedish Rally	Karlstad, Värmland County	Snow	20	335.55 km	PWRC
3	11 March	13 March	2nd Corona Rally Mexico	León, Guanajuato	Gravel	14	355.97 km	JWRC
4	7 April	10 April	36th Propecia Rally New Zealand	Manukau, Auckland	Gravel	20	356.00 km	PWRC
5	29 April	1 May	(Italy) 2nd Supermag Rally Italia Sardinia	Olbia, Sardinia	Gravel	17	349.08 km	JWRC
6	13 May	15 May	33rd Cyprus Rally	Lemesos, Limassol District	Gravel	18	326.68 km	PWRC
7	3 June	5 June	6th Rally of Turkey	Kemer, Antalya Province	Gravel	18	351.03 km	PWRC
8	23 June	26 June	52nd Acropolis Rally of Greece	Lamia, Central Greece	Gravel	19	349.57 km	JWRC
9	14 July	17 July	25th Rally Argentina	Carlos Paz, Córdoba	Gravel	22	340.82 km	PWRC
10	4 August	7 August	55th Neste Rally Finland	Jyväskylä, Central Finland	Gravel	21	355.59 km	JWRC
11	26 August	28 August	(Germany) 24th OMV ADAC Rallye Deutschland	Trier, Rhineland-Palatinate	Tarmac	19	356.16 km	JWRC
12	15 September	18 September	(United Kingdom) 61st Wales Rally GB	Cardiff, Wales	Gravel	17	354.22 km	PWRC
13	30 September	2 October	5th Rally Japan	Obihiro, Hokkaido	Gravel	26	350.18 km	PWRC
14	21 October	23 October	49th Tour de Corse – Rallye de France	Ajaccio, Corsica	Tarmac	12	341.68 km	JWRC
15	28 October	30 October	(Spain) 41st RallyRACC Catalunya – Costa Daurada	Salou, Catalonia	Tarmac	15	358.75 km	JWRC
16	10 November	13 November	18th Telstra Rally Australia	Perth, Western Australia	Gravel	26	355.39 km	PWRC

== Teams and drivers ==
World Rally Car entries eligible to score manufacturer points
Manufacturer	Car	Team	Tyre	No	Drivers	Co-Drivers	Rounds
Citroën	Xsara WRC	(France) Citroën Total	M	1	(France) Sébastien Loeb	(Monaco) Daniel Elena	All
Citroën	Xsara WRC	(France) Citroën Total	M	2	(Belgium) François Duval	(Belgium) Stéphane Prévot	1–6
Citroën	Xsara WRC	(France) Citroën Total	M	2	(Belgium) François Duval	(Belgium) Sven Smeets	9–16
Citroën	Xsara WRC	(France) Citroën Total	M	2	(Spain) Carlos Sainz	(Spain) Marc Marti	7–8
Ford	Focus RS WRC 04 1–15 Focus RS WRC 06 16	(United Kingdom) BP Ford World Rally Team	M	3	(Finland) Toni Gardemeister	(Finland) Jakke Honkanen	All
Ford	Focus RS WRC 04 1–15 Focus RS WRC 06 16	(United Kingdom) BP Ford World Rally Team	M	4	(Czech Republic) Roman Kresta	(Czech Republic) Jan Možný	3–10
Ford	Focus RS WRC 04 1–15 Focus RS WRC 06 16	(United Kingdom) BP Ford World Rally Team	M	4	(Finland) Mikko Hirvonen	(Finland) Jarmo Lehtinen	10
Ford	Focus RS WRC 04 1–15 Focus RS WRC 06 16	(United Kingdom) BP Ford World Rally Team	M	14	(Czech Republic) Roman Kresta	(Czech Republic) Jan Tománek	1–2, 11–16
Subaru	Impreza WRC2004 1–2 Impreza WRC2005 3–16	(Japan) Subaru World Rally Team	P	5	(Norway) Petter Solberg	(Wales) Phil Mills	All
Subaru	Impreza WRC2004 1–2 Impreza WRC2005 3–16	(Japan) Subaru World Rally Team	P	6	(France) Stéphane Sarrazin	(France) Denis Giraudet	2, 5, 8, 11–12, 14–15
Subaru	Impreza WRC2004 1–2 Impreza WRC2005 3–16	(Japan) Subaru World Rally Team	P	6	(Australia) Chris Atkinson	(Australia) Glenn Macneall	3–10, 12–13, 16
Subaru	Impreza WRC2004 1–2 Impreza WRC2005 3–16	(Japan) Subaru World Rally Team	P	15	(Australia) Chris Atkinson	(Australia) Glenn Macneall	2, 11
Subaru	Impreza WRC2004 1–2 Impreza WRC2005 3–16	(Japan) Subaru World Rally Team	P	16	(Australia) Chris Atkinson	(Australia) Glenn Macneall	2, 11
Subaru	Impreza WRC2004 1–2 Impreza WRC2005 3–16	(Japan) Subaru World Rally Team	P	16	(Australia) Chris Atkinson	(Australia) Glenn Macneall	15
Subaru	Impreza WRC2004 1–2 Impreza WRC2005 3–16	(Japan) Subaru World Rally Team	P	16	(France) Stéphane Sarrazin	(France) Patrick Pivato	1
Subaru	Impreza WRC2004 1–2 Impreza WRC2005 3–16	(Japan) Subaru World Rally Team	P	17	(Australia) Chris Atkinson	(Australia) Glenn Macneall	14
Peugeot	307 WRC/307 WRC Evo2	(France) Marlboro Peugeot Total	P	7	(Finland) Marcus Grönholm	(Finland) Timo Rautiainen	All
Peugeot	307 WRC/307 WRC Evo2	(France) Marlboro Peugeot Total	P	8	(Estonia) Markko Märtin	(United Kingdom) Michael Park	1–12
Peugeot	307 WRC/307 WRC Evo2	(France) Marlboro Peugeot Total	P	8	(Sweden) Daniel Carlsson	(Sweden) Mattias Andersson	13, 16
Peugeot	307 WRC/307 WRC Evo2	(France) Marlboro Peugeot Total	P	8	(France) Nicolas Bernardi	(Belgium) Jean-Marc Fortin	14–15
Mitsubishi	Lancer WRC05	(Japan) Mitsubishi Motors Motor Sports	P	9	(Finland) Harri Rovanperä	(Finland) Risto Pietiläinen	All
Mitsubishi	Lancer WRC05	(Japan) Mitsubishi Motors Motor Sports	P	10	(France) Gilles Panizzi	(France) Hervé Panizzi	1, 3, 6, 13–14
Mitsubishi	Lancer WRC05	(Japan) Mitsubishi Motors Motor Sports	P	10	(Italy) Gianluigi Galli	(Italy) Guido D'Amore	2, 4-5, 7-12, 15–16
Mitsubishi	Lancer WRC05	(Japan) Mitsubishi Motors Motor Sports	P	18	(Italy) Gianluigi Galli	(Italy) Guido D'Amore	14
Mitsubishi	Lancer WRC05	(Japan) Mitsubishi Motors Motor Sports	P	25	(Italy) Gianluigi Galli	(Italy) Guido D'Amore	13
Škoda	Fabia WRC	(Czech Republic) Škoda Motorsport	M	11	(Germany) Armin Schwarz	(Germany) Klaus Wicha	1, 3–16
Škoda	Fabia WRC	(Czech Republic) Škoda Motorsport	M	12	(France) Alexandre Bengué	(France) Caroline Escudero-Bengué	1, 11, 14–15
Škoda	Fabia WRC	(Czech Republic) Škoda Motorsport	M	12	(Finland) Janne Tuohino	(Finland) Mikko Markkula	2, 4–8
Škoda	Fabia WRC	(Czech Republic) Škoda Motorsport	M	12	(Finland) Jani Paasonen	(Finland) Jani Vainikka	3, 9–10
Škoda	Fabia WRC	(Czech Republic) Škoda Motorsport	M	12	(Scotland) Colin McRae	(Wales) Nicky Grist	12, 16
Škoda	Fabia WRC	(Czech Republic) Škoda Motorsport	M	12	(Finland) Mikko Hirvonen	(Finland) Jarmo Lehtinen	13
Škoda	Fabia WRC	(Czech Republic) Škoda Motorsport	M	16	(Finland) Jani Paasonen	(Finland) Jani Vainikka	2
Škoda	Fabia WRC	(Czech Republic) Škoda Motorsport	M	17	(Finland) Janne Tuohino	(Finland) Mikko Markkula	10
Škoda	Fabia WRC	(Czech Republic) Škoda Motorsport	M	17	(Czech Republic) Jan Kopecký	(Czech Republic) Filip Schovánek	11, 14–15
Škoda	Fabia WRC	(Czech Republic) Škoda Motorsport	M	18	(Finland) Jani Paasonen	(Finland) Jani Vainikka	8

World Rally Car entries ineligible to score manufacturer points
Manufacturer	Car	Team	Tyre	Drivers	Co-Drivers	Rounds
Citroën	Xsara WRC	(Belgium) OMV World Rally Team	M	(Austria) Manfred Stohl	(Austria) Ilka Minor	1, 4–6, 8–12, 16
Citroën	Xsara WRC	(Belgium) OMV World Rally Team	M	(Spain) Xavier Pons	(Spain) Carlos del Barrio	8–12, 14–16
Citroën	Xsara WRC	(Belgium) OMV World Rally Team	M	(Finland) Juuso Pykälistö	(Finland) Mika Ovaskainen	5
Ford	Focus RS WRC 04	(United Kingdom) BP Ford World Rally Team	M	(Norway) Henning Solberg	(Norway) Cato Menkerud	2, 5–8, 10, 12
Ford	Focus RS WRC 04	(United Kingdom) BP Ford World Rally Team	M	(Spain) Daniel Solà	(Spain) Xavier Amigò	3, 11, 13–16
Ford	Focus RS WRC 04	(United Kingdom) BP Ford World Rally Team	M	(Germany) Antony Warmbold	(Republic of Ireland) Damien Connolly	1
Ford	Focus RS WRC 04	(United Kingdom) BP Ford World Rally Team	M	(Germany) Antony Warmbold	(United Kingdom) Michael Orr	2-16
Ford	Focus RS WRC 04	(United Kingdom) BP Ford World Rally Team	M	(Argentina) Luís Pérez Companc	(Argentina) Jose Maria Volta	4, 9
Ford	Focus RS WRC 04	(United Kingdom) Stobart VK Ford Rally Team	M	(United Kingdom) Mark Higgins	(United Kingdom) Trevor Agnew	5, 8, 12
Ford	Focus RS WRC 02	(United Kingdom) Stobart VK Ford Rally Team	M	(United Kingdom) Matthew Wilson	(United Kingdom) Scott Martin	12
Hyundai	Accent WRC3	(Turkey) Hyundai Assan Motorsports	P	(Turkey) Serkan Yazici	(Turkey) Can Okan	7
Hyundai	Accent WRC	(Turkey) Hyundai Assan Motorsports	P	(Turkey) Ali Deveci	(Turkey) Mehmet Yazici	7
Hyundai	Accent WRC	(Turkey) Hyundai Assan Motorsports	P	(Turkey) Murat Akdilek	(Turkey) Ozden Yilmaz	7
Ford	Focus RS WRC 03	(United Kingdom) M-Sport	M	(Finland) Mikko Hirvonen	(Finland) Jarmo Lehtinen	2, 5, 8, 15
Peugeot	206 WRC	(France) Bozian Racing	M P	(Sweden) Daniel Carlsson	(Sweden) Mattias Andersson	6, 9
Peugeot	206 WRC	(France) Bozian Racing	M P	(Argentina) Marcos Ligato	(Argentina) Ruben Garcia	9
Peugeot	206 WRC	(France) Bozian Racing	M P	(Spain) Xavier Pons	(Spain) Oriol Juliá Pascual	5
Peugeot	206 WRC	(France) Bozian Racing	M P	(Spain) Xavier Pons	(Spain) Lucas Cruz	3
Peugeot	206 WRC	(France) Bozian Racing	M P	(France) Didier Auriol	(France) Denis Giraudet	1
Peugeot	206 WRC	(France) Bozian Racing	M P	(Mexico) Ricardo Triviño	(Spain) Carlos del Barrio	3
Peugeot	206 WRC	(France) Bozian Racing	M P	(Mexico) Ricardo Triviño	(Argentina) Claudio Busto	9
Peugeot	206 WRC	(France) Bozian Racing	M P	(Mexico) Ricardo Triviño	(Spain) Checo Salom	15
Peugeot	307 WRC	(France) Bozian Racing	M P	(Sweden) Daniel Carlsson	(Sweden) Mattias Andersson	2
Peugeot	206 WRC	(Spain) Xavier Pons	M	(Spain) Xavier Pons	(Spain) Oriol Juliá Pascual	1
Škoda	Fabia WRC	(Czech Republic) Škoda Motorsport	M	(Sweden) Mattias Ekström	(Sweden) Stefan Bergman	2
Škoda	Fabia WRC	Equipe de France FFSA	M	(France) Nicolas Vouilloz	(France) Patrick Pivato	14–15
Peugeot	206 WRC	Equipe de France FFSA	M	(France) Nicolas Bernardi	(Belgium) Jean-Marc Fortin	11–12
Toyota	Corolla WRC	(Finland) Jari-Matti Latvala	M	(Finland) Jari-Matti Latvala	(Finland) Miikka Anttila	2, 10
Ford	Focus RS WRC 03	(Finland) Jari-Matti Latvala	M	(Finland) Jari-Matti Latvala	(Finland) Miikka Anttila	12
Peugeot	206 WRC	(Czech Republic) Štěpán Vojtěch	M	(Czech Republic) Štěpán Vojtěch	(Czech Republic) Michal Ernst	11
Subaru	Impreza WRC2003	(Republic of Ireland) Eamonn Boland	P	(Republic of Ireland) Eamonn Boland	(Republic of Ireland) Francis Regan	1
Ford	Focus RS WRC 03	(Republic of Ireland) Eamonn Boland	M	(Republic of Ireland) Eamonn Boland	(Republic of Ireland) Francis Regan	15
Peugeot	307 WRC	(Finland) Sebastian Lindholm	M	(Finland) Sebastian Lindholm	(Finland) Tomi Tuominen	10
Subaru	Impreza WRC2004	(Sweden) Rally Team Olsbergs	P	(Sweden) Daniel Carlsson	(Sweden) Mattias Andersson	5, 7–8
Subaru	Impreza WRC2004	(Sweden) Rally Team Olsbergs	P	(Sweden) Tobias Johansson	(Norway) Ola Fløene	2
Subaru	Impreza WRC2004	(Sweden) Rally Team Olsbergs	P	(Sweden) Tobias Johansson	(Finland) Kaj Lindström	3, 5, 7–8
Škoda	Octavia WRC	(Italy) Riccardo Errani	M P	(Italy) Riccardo Errani	(Italy) Stefano Casadio	1, 5
Ford	Focus RS WRC 02	(Finland) Kristian Sohlberg	M	(Finland) Kristian Sohlberg	(Finland) Kaj Lindström	2
Subaru	Impreza WRC2004	(Finland) Kristian Sohlberg	M	(Finland) Kristian Sohlberg	(Finland) Timo Hantunen	8, 10
Peugeot	206 WRC	(Republic of Ireland) George Tracey		(Republic of Ireland) George Tracey	(Sweden) Maria Andersson	2
Toyota	Corolla WRC	(Italy) Giovanni Recordati	M	(Italy) Giovanni Recordati	(Monaco) Freddy Delorme	5, 6
Škoda	Fabia WRC	(United Kingdom) Nigel Heath	P	(United Kingdom) Nigel Heath	(United Kingdom) Steve Lancaster	5
Subaru	Impreza WRC2001	(United Kingdom) Nigel Heath		(United Kingdom) Nigel Heath	(United Kingdom) Steve Lancaster	7
Ford	Focus RS WRC 02	(Hungary) Balázs Benik		(Hungary) Balázs Benik	(Hungary) Attila Vinoczai	6
Subaru	Impreza WRC2004	(Greece) Armodios Vovos	P	(Greece) Armodios Vovos	(Greece) "El-Em"	7–8
Ford	Focus RS WRC 01	(Turkey) Mehmet Besler		(Turkey) Mehmet Besler	(Turkey) Afsin Baydar	7
Ford	Focus RS WRC 01	(Turkey) Nejat Avci		(Turkey) Nejat Avci	(Turkey) Batuhan Memisyazici	7
Ford	Focus RS WRC 03	(Greece) Ioannis Papadimitriou		(Greece) Ioannis Papadimitriou	(United Kingdom) Allan Harryman	8
Škoda	Octavia WRC Evo3	(Greece) Yorgo Philippedes		(Greece) Yorgo Philippedes	(United Kingdom) Marshall Clarke	8
Subaru	Impreza WRC2003	(Argentina) Juan Pablo Raies		(Argentina) Juan Pablo Raies	(Argentina) Jorge Perez Companc	9
Ford	Focus WRC 00	(United Kingdom) Julian Reynolds		(United Kingdom) Julian Reynolds	(United Kingdom) Ieuan Thomas	12
Škoda	Fabia WRC	(United Kingdom) Craig Middleton		(United Kingdom) Craig Middleton	(United Kingdom) Robin Hernaman	12
Subaru	Impreza WRC99	(United Kingdom) John Lloyd		(United Kingdom) John Lloyd	(United Kingdom) Pauline Gullick	12
SEAT	Córdoba WRC Evo3	(Spain) Joan Ollé		(Spain) Joan Ollé	(Spain) Ramón Izquierdo	15
Ford	Focus RS WRC 01	(Switzerland) Massimo Beltrami		(Switzerland) Massimo Beltrami	(Italy) Fabio Ceschino	15
Subaru	Impreza WRC2003	(Republic of Ireland) Paddy White		(Republic of Ireland) Paddy White	(Republic of Ireland) Martin Brady	15
Subaru	Impreza WRC2004	(United Kingdom) Kris Meeke		(United Kingdom) Kris Meeke	(United Kingdom) Glenn Patterson	12
Peugeot	206 WRC	(Italy) Luca Rossetti	P	(Italy) Luca Rossetti	(Italy) Dario D'Esposito	1

=== JWRC entries ===
Team	Manufacturer	Car	No	Driver	Co-drivers	Rounds
(Japan) Suzuki Sport Europe	Suzuki	Ignis S1600	31	(Sweden) Per-Gunnar Andersson	(Sweden) Jonas Andersson	1, 3, 5, 8
(Japan) Suzuki Sport Europe	Suzuki	Ignis S1600	31	(Sweden) Per-Gunnar Andersson	(Sweden) Jonas Andersson	10–11, 15
(Japan) Suzuki Sport Europe	Suzuki	Ignis S1600	32	(United Kingdom) Guy Wilks	(United Kingdom) Phil Pugh	10–11, 15
(Japan) Suzuki Sport Europe	Suzuki	Ignis S1600	32	(United Kingdom) Guy Wilks	(United Kingdom) Phil Pugh	1, 3, 5, 8
(Japan) Suzuki Sport Europe	Suzuki	Ignis S1600	33	(Finland) Kosti Katajamäki	(Finland) Timo Alanne	1, 5, 8, 10–11, 14–15
(Japan) Suzuki Sport Europe	Suzuki	Ignis S1600	36	(Estonia) Urmo Aava	(Estonia) Kuldar Sikk	1, 5, 8, 10–11, 14–15
(Italy) Fiat Abarth Motorsport	Fiat	Punto S1600	34	(San Marino) Mirco Baldacci	(Italy) Giovanni Bernacchini	1, 5, 8, 10–11, 14–15
(Belgium) Kronos Racing	Citroën	C2 S1600	35	(United Kingdom) Kris Meeke	(United Kingdom) Chris Patterson	1, 5, 8
(Belgium) Kronos Racing	Citroën	C2 S1600	35	(United Kingdom) Kris Meeke	(United Kingdom) Glenn Patterson	10–11, 14–15
(Belgium) Kronos Racing	Citroën	C2 S1600	41	(Spain) Daniel Sordo	(Spain) Marc Martí	1, 5, 10–11, 14–15
(Belgium) Kronos Racing	Citroën	C2 S1600	41	(Spain) Daniel Sordo	(Spain) Oriol Julià	8
(Italy) Errepi Racing	Suzuki	Ignis S1600	37	(Italy) Alan Scorcioni	(Italy) Domenico Scorcioni	15
(Italy) Errepi Racing	Suzuki	Ignis S1600	37	(Italy) Alan Scorcioni	(Italy) Silvio Stefanelli	1, 5, 8, 14
(Italy) Errepi Racing	Fiat	Punto S1600	37	(Italy) Alan Scorcioni	(Italy) Silvio Stefanelli	10
(Italy) Errepi Racing	Fiat	Punto S1600	37	(Italy) Alan Scorcioni	(Italy) Toni Moreno	11
(Italy) Power Car Team	Renault	Clio S1600	38	(Italy) Luca Betti	(Italy) Giovanni Agnese	1, 5, 8, 11, 14–15
(Italy) Power Car Team	Renault	Clio S1600	38	(Italy) Luca Betti	(Italy) Piercarlo Capalongo	10
(Italy) Autorel Sport	Renault	Clio S1600	39	(Italy) Luca Cecchettini	(Italy) Massimo Daddoveri	1
(Italy) Autorel Sport	Fiat	Punto S1600	39	(Italy) Luca Cecchettini	(Italy) Massimo Daddoveri	3, 5, 8, 11
(Italy) Autorel Sport	Fiat	Punto S1600	39	(Italy) Luca Cecchettini	(Italy) Antonio Morassi	14–15
(France) PH Sport	Citroën	Saxo S1600	40	(Zimbabwe) Conrad Rautenbach	(United Kingdom) Carl Williamson	3
(France) PH Sport	Citroën	C2 S1600	40	(Zimbabwe) Conrad Rautenbach	(United Kingdom) Carl Williamson	5, 8, 10–11, 14–15
(Czech Republic) Trumf Rally Team	Suzuki	Ignis S1600	42	(Czech Republic) Pavel Valoušek	(Italy) Pierangelo Scalvini	1, 3, 5, 10–11
(Czech Republic) Trumf Rally Team	Suzuki	Ignis S1600	42	(Czech Republic) Pavel Valoušek	(Czech Republic) Petr Starý	14–15
(Czech Republic) Jipocar Racing	Suzuki	Ignis S1600	43	(Czech Republic) Martin Prokop	(Czech Republic) Petr Gross	1, 5, 8, 10–11, 14–15

=== PWRC entries ===
Team	Manufacturer	Car	No	Driver	Co-drivers	Rounds
(Japan) Subaru Team Arai	Subaru	Impreza WRX STI	31	(Japan) Toshihiro Arai	(New Zealand) Tony Sircombe	2, 4, 6–7, 13, 16
Ralliart Spain	Mitsubishi	Lancer Evo VIII	32	(Spain) Xavier Pons	(Spain) Oriol Julià	2, 4, 6–7
(United Kingdom) Autotek Motorsport	Subaru	Impreza WRX STI	33	(Qatar) Nasser Al-Attiyah	(United Kingdom) Chris Patterson	4, 6–7, 9, 12, 16
(Japan) Advan-Piaa Rally Team	Mitsubishi	Lancer Evo VIII	34	(Japan) Fumio Nutahara	(Japan) Satoshi Hayashi	2, 4, 6–7, 13, 16
Team Proton Pert Malaysia	Proton	Proton Pert	35	(Malaysia) Karamjit Singh	(United Kingdom) John Bennie	4, 6–7, 12
Subaru Argentina Rally Team	Subaru	Impreza WRX STI	36	(Argentina) Marcos Ligato	(Argentina) Rubén García	4, 6–7, 12–13, 16
Subaru Argentina Rally Team	Subaru	Impreza WRX STI	40	(Argentina) Gabriel Pozzo	(Argentina) Daniel Stillo	4, 6–7, 9, 13, 16
Subaru Argentina Rally Team	Subaru	Impreza WRX STI	44	(Argentina) Sebastián Beltran	(Argentina) Edgardo Galindo	4, 6–7, 9, 13, 16
(Italy) Top Run SRL	Subaru	Impreza WRX STI	37	(United Kingdom) Mark Higgins	(United Kingdom) Trevor Agnew	2, 4, 6–7, 9
(Italy) Top Run SRL	Subaru	Impreza WRX STI	37	(United Kingdom) Mark Higgins	(United Kingdom) Daniel Barritt	16
(Italy) Top Run SRL	Subaru	Impreza WRX STI	51	(France) Brice Tirabassi	(France) Matthieu Baumel	4, 6–7, 9, 12–13
(Italy) Motoring Club	Subaru	Impreza WRX STI	38	(Italy) Fabio Frisiero	(Italy) Giovanni Agnese	2, 6–7, 9, 12
(Italy) Motoring Club	Mitsubishi	Lancer Evo VIII	38	(Italy) Fabio Frisiero	(Italy) Giovanni Agnese	16
(Sweden) Millbrooks World Rally Team	Subaru	Impreza WRX STI	39	(Sweden) Joakim Roman	(Sweden) Ragnar Spjuth	2, 6–7, 9
(Sweden) Millbrooks World Rally Team	Subaru	Impreza WRX STI	39	(Sweden) Joakim Roman	(Sweden) Anders Wallbom	12
(Austria) OMV World Rally Team	Mitsubishi	Lancer Evo VII	41	(United Kingdom) Natalie Barratt	(United Kingdom) Carl Williamson	4, 6–7, 13
(Austria) OMV World Rally Team	Subaru	Impreza WRX STI	41	(United Kingdom) Natalie Barratt	(Finland) Kaj Lindström	12, 16
(Argentina) Villagra Racing	Mitsubishi	Lancer Evo VIII	42	(Argentina) Federico Villagra	(Argentina) Javier Villagra	4, 6–7, 9, 13, 16
(Italy) Kome Sport SRL	Mitsubishi	Lancer Evo VIII	43	(Italy) Angelo Medeghini	(Italy) Barbara Capoferri	2, 4, 6, 9
(Italy) Kome Sport SRL	Subaru	Impreza WRX STI	43	(Italy) Angelo Medeghini	(Italy) Barbara Capoferri	12, 16
(Italy) Errani Team Group	Mitsubishi	Lancer Evo VIII	45	(Italy) Riccardo Errani	(Italy) Stefano Casadio	2, 6–7, 12–13, 16
(Paraguay) Aba Ba	Mitsubishi	Lancer Evo VI	47	(Paraguay) Marcelo Recanate	(Paraguay) Víctor Federer	4
(Paraguay) Aba Ba	Mitsubishi	Lancer Evo VIII	47	(Paraguay) Marcelo Recanate	(Paraguay) Nalson Franco	6
(Paraguay) Aba Ba	Mitsubishi	Lancer Evo VIII	47	(Paraguay) Marcelo Recanate	(Sweden) Mikael Johansson	7
(Chile) Gerardo Rosselot Mujica	Mitsubishi	Lancer Evo VIII	48	(Chile) Luis Rosselot	(Chile) Ricardo Rojas	4, 6–7, 9, 13
Oman World Rally Team	Subaru	Impreza WRX STI	49	(Oman) Hamed Al-Wahaibi	(United Kingdom) David Senior	4, 6–7, 12–13, 16
(Japan) Syms Rally Team	Subaru	Impreza WRX STI	50	(Finland) Aki Teiskonen	(Finland) Miika Teiskonen	2, 4, 7, 12–13, 16

== Results and standings ==
=== Rally results ===
The highest finishing competitor entered in each WRC class is listed below. Non-championship entries may have finished ahead of WRC competitors in individual rounds.

Rd.	Rally	Overall winners	PWRC Winners	JWRC winners	Report
1	(Monaco) Monte Carlo	(France) No. 1 Citroën Total WRT	N/A	(Belgium) No. 35 Kronos Racing	Report
1	(Monaco) Monte Carlo	(France) Citroën Xsara WRC	N/A	(France) Citroën C2 S1600	Report
1	(Monaco) Monte Carlo	(France) Sébastien Loeb (Monaco) Daniel Elena	N/A	(United Kingdom) Kris Meeke (United Kingdom) Chris Patterson	Report
2	Sweden	(Japan) No. 5 Subaru World Rally Team	(Japan) No. 31 Subaru Team Arai	N/A	Report
2	Sweden	(Japan) Subaru Impreza S10 WRC '04	(Japan) Subaru Impreza STi N11	N/A	Report
2	Sweden	(Norway) Petter Solberg (United Kingdom) Phil Mills	(Japan) Toshihiro Arai (New Zealand) Tony Sircombe	N/A	Report
3	Mexico	(Japan) No. 5 Subaru World Rally Team	N/A	(Japan) No. 33 Suzuki Sport	Report
3	Mexico	(Japan) Subaru Impreza S11 WRC '05	N/A	(Japan) Suzuki Ignis S1600	Report
3	Mexico	(Norway) Petter Solberg (United Kingdom) Phil Mills	N/A	(United Kingdom) Guy Wilks (United Kingdom) Phil Pugh	Report
4	New Zealand	(France) No. 1 Citroën Total WRT	No. 32 Ralliart Spain	N/A	Report
4	New Zealand	(France) Citroën Xsara WRC	(Japan) Mitsubishi Lancer Evo VIII	N/A	Report
4	New Zealand	(France) Sébastien Loeb (Monaco) Daniel Elena	(Spain) Xavier Pons (Spain) Oriol Julià	N/A	Report
5	Italy	(France) No. 1 Citroën Total WRT	N/A	(Belgium) No. 41 Kronos Racing	Report
5	Italy	(France) Citroën Xsara WRC	N/A	(France) Citroën C2 S1600	Report
5	Italy	(France) Sébastien Loeb (Monaco) Daniel Elena	N/A	(Spain) Dani Sordo (Spain) Marc Martí	Report
6	Cyprus	(France) No. 1 Citroën Total WRT	(Italy) No. 51 Top Run SRL	N/A	Report
6	Cyprus	(France) Citroën Xsara WRC	(Japan) Subaru Impreza STi N11	N/A	Report
6	Cyprus	(France) Sébastien Loeb (Monaco) Daniel Elena	(France) Brice Tirabassi (France) Mathieu Baumel	N/A	Report
7	Turkey	(France) No. 1 Citroën Total WRT	(Japan) No. 31 Subaru Team Arai	N/A	Report
7	Turkey	(France) Citroën Xsara WRC	(Japan) Subaru Impreza STi N11	N/A	Report
7	Turkey	(France) Sébastien Loeb (Monaco) Daniel Elena	(Japan) Toshihiro Arai (New Zealand) Tony Sircombe	N/A	Report
8	Greece	(France) No. 1 Citroën Total WRT	N/A	(Japan) No. 31 Suzuki Sport	Report
8	Greece	(France) Citroën Xsara WRC	N/A	(Japan) Suzuki Ignis S1600	Report
8	Greece	(France) Sébastien Loeb (Monaco) Daniel Elena	N/A	(Sweden) Per-Gunnar Andersson (Sweden) Jonas Andersson	Report
9	Argentina	(France) No. 1 Citroën Total WRT	(United Kingdom) No. 33 Autotek Motorsport	N/A	Report
9	Argentina	(France) Citroën Xsara WRC	(Japan) Subaru Impreza STi N11	N/A	Report
9	Argentina	(France) Sébastien Loeb (Monaco) Daniel Elena	(Qatar) Nasser Al-Attiyah (United Kingdom) Chris Patterson	N/A	Report
10	Finland	(France) No. 7 Marlboro Peugeot Total	N/A	(Belgium) No. 41 Kronos Racing	Report
10	Finland	(France) Peugeot 307 WRC	N/A	(France) Citroën C2 S1600	Report
10	Finland	(Finland) Marcus Grönholm (Finland) Timo Rautiainen	N/A	(Spain) Dani Sordo (Spain) Marc Martí	Report
11	Germany	(France) No. 1 Citroën Total WRT	N/A	(Belgium) No. 41 Kronos Racing	Report
11	Germany	(France) Citroën Xsara WRC	N/A	(France) Citroën C2 S1600	Report
11	Germany	(France) Sébastien Loeb (Monaco) Daniel Elena	N/A	(Spain) Dani Sordo (Spain) Marc Martí	Report
12	(United Kingdom) Britain	(Japan) No. 5 Subaru World Rally Team	(Japan) No. 50 Syms Rally Team	N/A	Report
12	(United Kingdom) Britain	(Japan) Subaru Impreza S11 WRC '05	(Japan) Subaru Impreza STi N11	N/A	Report
12	(United Kingdom) Britain	(Norway) Petter Solberg (United Kingdom) Phil Mills	(Finland) Aki Teiskonen (Finland) Miika Teiskonen	N/A	Report
13	Japan	(France) No. 7 Marlboro Peugeot Total	(Japan) No. 31 Subaru Team Arai	N/A	Report
13	Japan	(France) Peugeot 307 WRC	(Japan) Subaru Impreza STi N11	N/A	Report
13	Japan	(Finland) Marcus Grönholm (Finland) Timo Rautiainen	(Japan) Toshihiro Arai (New Zealand) Tony Sircombe	N/A	Report
14	France	(France) No. 1 Citroën Total WRT	N/A	(Italy) No. 34 Fiat Abarth Motorsport	Report
14	France	(France) Citroën Xsara WRC	N/A	(Italy) Fiat Punto S1600	Report
14	France	(France) Sébastien Loeb (Monaco) Daniel Elena	N/A	(San Marino) Mirco Baldacci (Italy) Giovanni Bernacchini	Report
15	Spain	(France) No. 1 Citroën Total WRT	N/A	(Belgium) No. 41 Kronos Racing	Report
15	Spain	(France) Citroën Xsara WRC	N/A	(France) Citroën C2 S1600	Report
15	Spain	(France) Sébastien Loeb (Monaco) Daniel Elena	N/A	(Spain) Dani Sordo (Spain) Marc Martí	Report
16	Australia	(France) No. 2 Citroën Total WRT	(Japan) No. 31 Subaru Team Arai	N/A	Report
16	Australia	(France) Citroën Xsara WRC	(Japan) Subaru Impreza STi N11	N/A	Report
16	Australia	(Belgium) François Duval (Belgium) Sven Smeets	(Japan) Toshihiro Arai (New Zealand) Tony Sircombe	N/A	Report

=== Drivers' championship ===
Pos.	Driver	MON (Monaco)	SWE (Sweden)	MEX (Mexico)	NZL (New Zealand)	ITA (Italy)	CYP (Cyprus)	TUR (Turkey)	GRE (Greece)	ARG (Argentina)	FIN (Finland)	GER (Germany)	GBR (United Kingdom)	JPN (Japan)	FRA (France)	ESP (Spain)	AUS (Australia)	Pts
1	(France) Sébastien Loeb	1	Ret	4	1	1	1	1	1	1	2	1	3	2	1	1	Ret	127
2	(Norway) Petter Solberg	Ret	1	1	3	2	Ret	2	9	3	4	7	1	Ret	3	13	Ret	71
3	(Finland) Marcus Grönholm	5	Ret	2	2	3	Ret	3	4	2	1	3	Ret	1	Ret	Ret	Ret	71
4	(Finland) Toni Gardemeister	2	3	6	6	5	5	6	2	4	6	17	DSQ	6	2	14	Ret	58
5	(Estonia) Markko Märtin	4	2	3	5	4	3	5	8	6	3	4	Ret					53
6	(Belgium) François Duval	Ret	12	Ret	4	11	Ret			7	8	2	2	4	Ret	2	1	47
7	(Finland) Harri Rovanperä	7	4	5	Ret	Ret	7	10	6	5	7	10	4	5	10	10	2	39
8	(Czech Republic) Roman Kresta	8	8	Ret	DNS	6	6	7	Ret	11	23	6	6	7	5	5	6	29
9	(Austria) Manfred Stohl	6			9	9	2		20	8	Ret	Ret	5				3	22
10	(Finland) Mikko Hirvonen		Ret			Ret			5		5			Ret		3		14
11	(Italy) Gianluigi Galli		7		8	Ret		8	7	Ret	Ret	5	13	Ret	9	Ret	5	14
12	(Australia) Chris Atkinson		19	Ret	7	18	10	24	Ret	9	Ret	11	38	3	Ret	9	4	13
13	(Spain) Carlos Sainz							4	3									11
14	(Norway) Henning Solberg		5			15	4	11	Ret		9		10					9
15	(France) Gilles Panizzi	3		8			11							11	Ret			7
16	(Spain) Xavier Pons	Ret	38	10	13	Ret	34	17	10	10	12	9	11		7	4	Ret	7
17	(France) Stéphane Sarrazin	14	13			12			13			8	Ret		4	Ret		6
18	(Germany) Antony Warmbold	10	11	7	11	7	Ret	9	Ret	12	Ret	DNS	12	9	13	7	Ret	6
19	(Sweden) Daniel Carlsson		6			Ret	8	Ret	14	15	DNS			8			Ret	5
20	(France) Nicolas Bernardi											Ret	Ret		8	6		4
21	(France) Alexandre Bengué	9										Ret			6	Ret		3
22	(United Kingdom) Colin McRae												7				Ret	2
23	(Spain) Daniel Solà			Ret								12		Ret	Ret	Ret	7	2
24	(Finland) Juuso Pykälistö		DNS			8					DNS							1
25	(United Kingdom) Mark Higgins		Ret		Ret	10	Ret	44	Ret	DSQ	DNS		8				10	1
26	(Czech Republic) Jan Kopecký		37									Ret			12	8		1
27	(Germany) Armin Schwarz	Ret		9	10	Ret	13	Ret	18	16	11	Ret	14	10	Ret	11	8	1
Pos.	Driver	MON (Monaco)	SWE (Sweden)	MEX (Mexico)	NZL (New Zealand)	ITA (Italy)	CYP (Cyprus)	TUR (Turkey)	GRE (Greece)	ARG (Argentina)	FIN (Finland)	GER (Germany)	GBR (United Kingdom)	JPN (Japan)	FRA (France)	ESP (Spain)	AUS (Australia)	Pts

Key
Colour	Result
Gold	Winner
Silver	2nd place
Bronze	3rd place
Green	Points finish
Blue	Non-points finish
Blue	Non-classified finish (NC)
Purple	Did not finish (Ret)
Black	Excluded (EX)
Black	Disqualified (DSQ)
White	Did not start (DNS)
White	Cancelled (C)
Blank	Withdrew entry from the event (WD)

=== Manufacturers' championship ===
Pos.	Manufacturer	No.	MON (Monaco)	SWE (Sweden)	MEX (Mexico)	NZL (New Zealand)	ITA (Italy)	CYP (Cyprus)	TUR (Turkey)	GRE (Greece)	ARG (Argentina)	FIN (Finland)	GER (Germany)	GBR (United Kingdom)	JPN (Japan)	FRA (France)	ESP (Spain)	AUS (Australia)	Points
1	(France) Citroën	1	1	Ret	4	1	1	1	1	1	1	2	1	3	2	1	1	Ret	188
1	(France) Citroën	2	Ret	8	Ret	4	7	Ret	4	3	7	8	2	2	4	Ret	2	1	188
2	(France) Peugeot	7	5	Ret	2	2	3	Ret	3	4	2	1	3	Ret	1	Ret	Ret	Ret	135
2	(France) Peugeot	8	4	2	3	5	4	2	5	7	6	3	4	Ret	8	7	4	Ret	135
3	(United Kingdom) Ford	3	2	3	6	6	5	3	6	2	4	6	10	Ret	6	2	8	Ret	104
3	(United Kingdom) Ford	4	7	5	Ret	Ret	6	4	7	Ret	9	5	6	5	7	5	3	5	104
4	(Japan) Subaru	5	Ret	1	1	3	2	Ret	2	8	3	4	7	1	Ret	3	7	Ret	97
4	(Japan) Subaru	6	9	9	Ret	7	9	7	11	Ret	8	Ret	8	9	3	4	Ret	3	97
5	(Japan) Mitsubishi	9	6	4	5	Ret	Ret	5	9	5	5	7	9	4	5	8	5	2	76
5	(Japan) Mitsubishi	10	3	6	7	8	Ret	8	8	6	Ret	Ret	5	8	10	Ret	Ret	4	76
6	(Czech Republic) Škoda	11	Ret	7	8	9	Ret	9	Ret	9	10	9	Ret	7	9	Ret	6	6	21
6	(Czech Republic) Škoda	12	8	Ret	9	Ret	8	6	10	Ret	Ret	Ret	Ret	6	Ret	6	Ret	Ret	21
Pos.	Manufacturer	No.	MON (Monaco)	SWE (Sweden)	MEX (Mexico)	NZL (New Zealand)	ITA (Italy)	CYP (Cyprus)	TUR (Turkey)	GRE (Greece)	ARG (Argentina)	FIN (Finland)	GER (Germany)	GBR (United Kingdom)	JPN (Japan)	FRA (France)	ESP (Spain)	AUS (Australia)	Points

Key
Colour	Result
Gold	Winner
Silver	2nd place
Bronze	3rd place
Green	Points finish
Blue	Non-points finish
Blue	Non-classified finish (NC)
Purple	Did not finish (Ret)
Black	Excluded (EX)
Black	Disqualified (DSQ)
White	Did not start (DNS)
White	Cancelled (C)
Blank	Withdrew entry from the event (WD)

=== JWRC Drivers' championship ===
Pos.	Driver	MON (Monaco)	MEX (Mexico)	ITA (Italy)	GRC (Greece)	FIN (Finland)	GER (Germany)	FRA (France)	ESP (Spain)	Pts
1	(Spain) Dani Sordo	4		1	Ret	1	1	2	1	53
2	(United Kingdom) Guy Wilks	7	1	6	2	3	3		Ret	35
3	(United Kingdom) Kris Meeke	1		3	6	7	2	8	7	32
4	(Estonia) Urmo Aava	Ret		2	3	2	Ret	4	4	32
5	(Finland) Kosti Katajamäki	2		Ret	4	Ret	5	3	2	31
6	(Sweden) Per-Gunnar Andersson	6	2	5	1	Ret	4		Ret	30
7	(San Marino) Mirco Baldacci	10		Ret	5	5	7	1	3	26
8	(Italy) Luca Betti	5		4	Ret	4	6	Ret	Ret	17
9	(Czech Republic) Martin Prokop	9		7	7	6	Ret	7	5	13
10	(Italy) Luca Cecchettini	Ret	3	Ret	Ret		9	6	8	10
11	(Czech Republic) Pavel Valoušek	8	4	9		Ret	8	Ret	6	10
12	(Zimbabwe) Conrad Rautenbach		Ret	8	8	8	Ret	5	Ret	7
13	(Italy) Alan Scorcioni	3		Ret	9	Ret	Ret	Ret	Ret	6
Pos.	Driver	MON (Monaco)	MEX (Mexico)	ITA (Italy)	GRC (Greece)	FIN (Finland)	GER (Germany)	FRA (France)	ESP (Spain)	Pts

Key
Colour	Result
Gold	Winner
Silver	2nd place
Bronze	3rd place
Green	Points finish
Blue	Non-points finish
Blue	Non-classified finish (NC)
Purple	Did not finish (Ret)
Black	Excluded (EX)
Black	Disqualified (DSQ)
White	Did not start (DNS)
White	Cancelled (C)
Blank	Withdrew entry from the event (WD)

=== PWRC Drivers' championship ===
Pos.	Driver	SWE (Sweden)	NZL (New Zealand)	CYP (Cyprus)	TUR (Turkey)	ARG (Argentina)	GBR (United Kingdom)	JPN (Japan)	AUS (Australia)	Pts
1	(Japan) Toshihiro Arai	1	2	7	1			1	1	50
2	(Qatar) Nasser Al-Attiyah		4	5	3	1	3		5	35
3	(Argentina) Marcos Ligato		3	3	2		2	4	9	33
4	(Japan) Fumio Nutahara	5	7	6	14			2	4	22
5	(Spain) Xavier Pons	4	1	10	4					20
6	(Finland) Aki Teiskonen	Ret	Ret		6		1	3	Ret	19
7	(Italy) Angelo Medeghini	2	Ret		10	2	6			19
8	(Argentina) Sebastián Beltran		10	2	7	6		5	10	17
9	(Italy) Fabio Frisiero	3		Ret	12	4	5		7	17
10	(Argentina) Gabriel Pozzo		Ret	4	Ret	5		Ret	3	15
11	(Oman) Hamed Al-Wahaibi		8	Ret	5		4	6	Ret	13
12	(France) Brice Tirabassi		9	1	8	Ret				11
13	(United Kingdom) Mark Higgins	Ret	Ret	Ret	13	Ret			2	6
14	(Argentina) Federico Villagra		6	8	9	Ret		Ret	6	7
15	(Italy) Riccardo Errani	6		9	11		8	7	8	7
16	(United Kingdom) Natalie Barratt		12	Ret	15		7	Ret	11	2
Pos.	Driver	SWE (Sweden)	NZL (New Zealand)	CYP (Cyprus)	TUR (Turkey)	ARG (Argentina)	GBR (United Kingdom)	JPN (Japan)	AUS (Australia)	Pts

Key
Colour	Result
Gold	Winner
Silver	2nd place
Bronze	3rd place
Green	Points finish
Blue	Non-points finish
Blue	Non-classified finish (NC)
Purple	Did not finish (Ret)
Black	Excluded (EX)
Black	Disqualified (DSQ)
White	Did not start (DNS)
White	Cancelled (C)
Blank	Withdrew entry from the event (WD)

== Events ==
Round	Rally name	Podium drivers (Finishing time)	Podium cars
1	(France) / (Monaco) Monte Carlo Rally (21–23 January) — Results and report	1. (France) Sébastien Loeb (4h:13m:05.6s); 2. (Finland) Toni Gardemeister (4h:16m:03.9s); 3. (France) Gilles Panizzi (4h:16m:45.7s)	1. Citroën Xsara WRC; 2. Ford Focus RS WRC 04; 3. Mitsubishi Lancer WRC
2	(Sweden) Swedish Rally (11–13 February) — Results and report	1. (Norway) Petter Solberg (3h:00m:52.1s); 2. (Estonia) Markko Märtin (3h:03m:03.2s); 3. (Finland) Toni Gardemeister (3h:04m:06.8s)	1. Subaru Impreza WRC 2004; 2. Peugeot 307 WRC; 3. Ford Focus RS WRC 04
3	Rally Mexico (11–13 March) — Results and report	1. (Norway) Petter Solberg (3h:41m:06.2s); 2. (Finland) Marcus Grönholm (3h:41m:40.7s); 3. (Estonia) Markko Märtin (3h:42m:44.5s)	1. Subaru Impreza WRC 2005; 2. Peugeot 307 WRC; 3. Peugeot 307 WRC
4	Rally New Zealand (8–10 April) — Results and report	1. (France) Sébastien Loeb (3h:34m:51.6s); 2. (Finland) Marcus Grönholm (3h:35m:41.4s); 3. (Norway) Petter Solberg (3h:36m:00.3s)	1. Citroën Xsara WRC; 2. Peugeot 307 WRC; 3. Subaru Impreza WRC 2005
5	(Italy) Rally d'Italia Sardegna (29 April–1 May) — Results and report	1. (France) Sébastien Loeb (4h:06m:33.7s); 2. (Norway) Petter Solberg (4h:07m:33.3s); 3. (Finland) Marcus Grönholm (4h:09m:41.0s)	1. Citroën Xsara WRC; 2. Subaru Impreza WRC 2005; 3. Peugeot 307 WRC
6	Cyprus Rally (13–15 May) — Results and report	1. (France) Sébastien Loeb (5h:02m:29.4s); 2. (Austria) Manfred Stohl (5h:06m:38.9s); 3. (Estonia) Markko Märtin (5h:07m:11.3s)	1. Citroën Xsara WRC; 2. Citroën Xsara WRC; 3. Peugeot 307 WRC
7	Rally of Turkey (2–5 June) — Results and report	1. (France) Sébastien Loeb (4h:21m:48.0s); 2. (Norway) Petter Solberg (4h:22m:47.6s); 3. (Finland) Marcus Grönholm (4h:23m:03.3s)	1. Citroën Xsara WRC; 2. Subaru Impreza WRC 2005; 3. Peugeot 307 WRC
8	(Greece) Acropolis Rally (23–26 June) — Results and report	1. (France) Sébastien Loeb (4h:12m:53.7s); 2. (Finland) Toni Gardemeister (4h:14m:29.9s); 3. (Spain) Carlos Sainz (4h:15m:04.8s)	1. Citroën Xsara WRC; 2. Ford Focus RS WRC 04; 3. Citroën Xsara WRC
9	Rally Argentina (14–17 July) — Results and report	1. (France) Sébastien Loeb (3h:55m:36.5s); 2. (Finland) Marcus Grönholm (3h:56m:02.5s); 3. (Norway) Petter Solberg (3h:56m:41.7s)	1. Citroën Xsara WRC; 2. Peugeot 307 WRC; 3. Subaru Impreza WRC 2005
10	Rally Finland (4–7 August) — Results and report	1. (Finland) Marcus Grönholm (2h:54m:11.0s); 2. (France) Sébastien Loeb (2h:55m:17.7s); 3. (Estonia) Markko Märtin (2h:55m:46.6s)	1. Peugeot 307 WRC; 2. Citroën Xsara WRC; 3. Peugeot 307 WRC
11	(Germany) Rallye Deutschland (25–27 August) — Results and report	1. (France) Sébastien Loeb (3h:27m:13.2s); 2. (Belgium) François Duval (3h:27m:50.6s); 3. (Finland) Marcus Grönholm (3h:29m:18.0s)	1. Citroën Xsara WRC; 2. Citroën Xsara WRC; 3. Peugeot 307 WRC
12	(United Kingdom) Wales Rally GB (16–18 September) — Results and report	1. (Norway) Petter Solberg (2h:45m:57.8s); 2. (Belgium) François Duval (2h:47m:15.2s); 3. (France) Sébastien Loeb (2h:47m:15.7s)	1. Subaru Impreza WRC 2005; 2. Citroën Xsara WRC; 3. Citroën Xsara WRC
13	Rally Japan (30 September–2 October) — Results and report	1. (Finland) Marcus Grönholm (3h:23m:32.0s); 2. (France) Sébastien Loeb (3h:26m:54.1s); 3. (Australia) Chris Atkinson (3h:28m:12.0s)	1. Peugeot 307 WRC; 2. Citroën Xsara WRC; 3. Subaru Impreza WRC 2005
14	(France) Tour de Corse (21–23 October) — Results and report	1. (France) Sébastien Loeb (3h:35m:46.7s); 2. (Finland) Toni Gardemeister (3h:37m:38.4s); 3. (Norway) Petter Solberg (3h:38m:28.7s)	1. Citroën Xsara WRC; 2. Ford Focus RS WRC 04; 3. Subaru Impreza WRC
15	(Spain) Rally Catalunya (28–30 October) — Results and report	1. (France) Sébastien Loeb (3h:31m:07.0s); 2. (Belgium) François Duval (3h:32m:28.9s); 3. (Finland) Mikko Hirvonen (3h:33m:53.7s)	1. Citroën Xsara WRC; 2. Citroën Xsara WRC; 3. Ford Focus RS WRC 03
16	Rally Australia (10–13 November) — Results and report	1. (Belgium) François Duval (3h:19m:55.0s); 2. (Finland) Harri Rovanperä (3h:20m:47.9s); 3. (Austria) Manfred Stohl (3h:21m:28.0s)	1. Citroën Xsara WRC; 2. Mitsubishi Lancer WRC; 3. Citroën Xsara WRC

=== Notes ===
1. Sébastien Loeb secured the drivers' championship title in Japan.
2. Citroën secured the manufacturers' championship in Spain.
