= 2010 Barum Czech Rally Zlín =

Motor rally competition

Round 9 of the 2010 Intercontinental Rally Challenge season
← Previous event	Next event →
- Czech Rally Logo
- Host country: Czech Republic
- Rally base: Zlín
- Dates run: 27 – 29 August 2010
- Stages: 17 (265.26 km; 164.82 miles)
- Stage surface: Asphalt
- Overall distance: 625.26 km (388.52 miles)

Statistics
- Crews: 112 at start, 58 at finish

Overall results
- Overall winner: (Belgium) Freddy Loix (Belgium) Freddy Loix

The 2010 Barum Czech Rally Zlín was the ninth round of the 2010 Intercontinental Rally Challenge (IRC) season and also a round of the European Rally Championship. The seventeen stage asphalt rally took place on 27 – 29 August 2010. Other than the opening stage on Friday night all stages were run in daylight.

== Introduction ==
The rally, which was being run for the 40th time, was based in the Moravian town of Zlín. Friday saw the ceremonial start and opening super-special stage running through the streets of Zlín. On Saturday a further eight stages covering 138.88 km (86.30 mi) were run on asphalt with the final eight stages (126.38 km (78.53 mi)) being completed on the Sunday. A record-breaking 28 Super 2000 cars started the rally, including six of the top seven drivers in the championship. New entries to the series included Keith Cronin and Niall McShea from the Proton R3 Rally Team.

== Results ==
The early part of the rally was dominated by Kopecký, who won the first, second and third stage and lead the rally at the end of the day. Day one saw a total of five different drivers take a stage win. Day two also saw five different stage winners and the overall lead change three times. Kopecký, while in the lead, crashed out of the rally on stage 14 handing the lead to Bouffier only for Loix to take the lead on stage 16 and win the rally. The result was the fourth 1–2–3 for Škoda in this year's championship.

=== Overall ===
Pos.	Driver	Co-driver	Car	Time	Difference	Points
1.	(Belgium) Freddy Loix	(Belgium) Fréderic Miclotte	Škoda Fabia S2000	2:31:31.0	0.0	10
2.	(Finland) Juho Hänninen	(Finland) Mikko Markkula	Škoda Fabia S2000	2:31:56.0	25.0	8
3.	(Czech Republic) Pavel Valoušek	(Czech Republic) Zdeněk Hrůza	Škoda Fabia S2000	2:32:51.2	1:20.2	6
4.	(United Kingdom) Kris Meeke	(Republic of Ireland) Paul Nagle	Peugeot 207 S2000	2:33:28.6	1:57.6	5
5.	(Norway) Andreas Mikkelsen	(Norway) Ola Fløene	Ford Fiesta S2000	2:34:04.9	2:33.9	4
6.	(Czech Republic) Václav Pech	(Czech Republic) Petr Uhel	Mitsubishi Lancer Evolution IX	2:34:38.4	3:07.4	3
7.	(United Kingdom) Guy Wilks	(United Kingdom) Phil Pugh	Škoda Fabia S2000	2:35:12.1	3:41.1	2
8.	(Czech Republic) Jaromír Tarabus	(Czech Republic) Daniel Trunkát	Ford Fiesta S2000	2:36:49.0	5:18.0	1

=== Special stages ===
Day	Stage	Time	Name	Length	Winner	Time	Avg. spd.	Rally leader
Leg 1 (27–28 Aug)	SS1	21:15	SSS Zlín	9.36 km	(Czech Republic) Jan Kopecký	7:15.0	77.46 km/h	(Czech Republic) Jan Kopecký
Leg 1 (27–28 Aug)	SS2	9:48	Biskupice 1	9.01 km	(Czech Republic) Jan Kopecký	5:02.8	107.12 km/h	(Czech Republic) Jan Kopecký
Leg 1 (27–28 Aug)	SS3	10:31	Zádveřice 1	14.95 km	(Czech Republic) Jan Kopecký	7:49.5	114.63 km/h	(Czech Republic) Jan Kopecký
Leg 1 (27–28 Aug)	SS4	11:24	Semetín 1	11.71 km	(Finland) Juho Hänninen	7:02.8	95.70 km/h	(Czech Republic) Jan Kopecký
Leg 1 (27–28 Aug)	SS5	11:52	Troják 1	29.09 km	(France) Bryan Bouffier	16:54.9	103.19 km/h	(Czech Republic) Jan Kopecký
Leg 1 (27–28 Aug)	SS6	14:55	Biskupice 2	9.01 km	(Czech Republic) Pavel Valoušek	5:17.3	102.23 km/h	(Czech Republic) Jan Kopecký
Leg 1 (27–28 Aug)	SS7	15:38	Zádveřice 2	14.95 km	(Czech Republic) Jan Kopecký	8:07.6	110.38 km/h	(Czech Republic) Jan Kopecký
Leg 1 (27–28 Aug)	SS8	16:31	Semetín 2	11.71 km	(Finland) Juho Hänninen	7:11.3	93.82 km/h	(Czech Republic) Jan Kopecký
Leg 1 (27–28 Aug)	SS9	16:59	Troják 2	29.09 km	(Belgium) Freddy Loix	17:00.9	102.58 km/h	(Czech Republic) Jan Kopecký
Leg 2 (29 Aug)	SS10	8:28	Halenkovice 1	24.90 km	(Czech Republic) Pavel Valoušek	13:12.1	113.17 km/h	(Czech Republic) Jan Kopecký
Leg 2 (29 Aug)	SS11	9:11	Kudlovice 1	11.39 km	(France) Bryan Bouffier	6:04.5	112.49 km/h	(Czech Republic) Jan Kopecký
Leg 2 (29 Aug)	SS12	9:59	Velký Ořechov 1	7.14 km	(Czech Republic) Jan Kopecký	3:48.9	112.29 km/h	(Czech Republic) Jan Kopecký
Leg 2 (29 Aug)	SS13	10:27	Pindula 1	19.76 km	(Czech Republic) Pavel Valoušek	10:31.6	112.63 km/h	(Czech Republic) Jan Kopecký
Leg 2 (29 Aug)	SS14	12:45	Halenkovice 2	24.90 km	(Belgium) Freddy Loix	13:44.0^{1}	108.79 km/h	(France) Bryan Bouffier
Leg 2 (29 Aug)	SS15	13:28	Kudlovice 2	11.39 km	(France) Bryan Bouffier	6:05.4	112.22 km/h	(France) Bryan Bouffier
Leg 2 (29 Aug)	SS16	14:16	Velký Ořechov 2	7.14 km	(Finland) Juho Hänninen	4:06.7	104.19 km/h	(Belgium) Freddy Loix
Leg 2 (29 Aug)	SS17	14:44	Pindula 2	19.76 km	(Czech Republic) Pavel Valoušek	10:42.4	110.73 km/h	(Belgium) Freddy Loix

Notes:

1. – SS14 was cancelled after an accident for Josef Béreš, who was running 23rd on the road. A nominal time of 15:09.0 was given for the drivers who had yet to complete the stage, while times for several other drivers, including Loix and Bouffier stood.
