= Citroën C2 S1600 =

Racing automobile

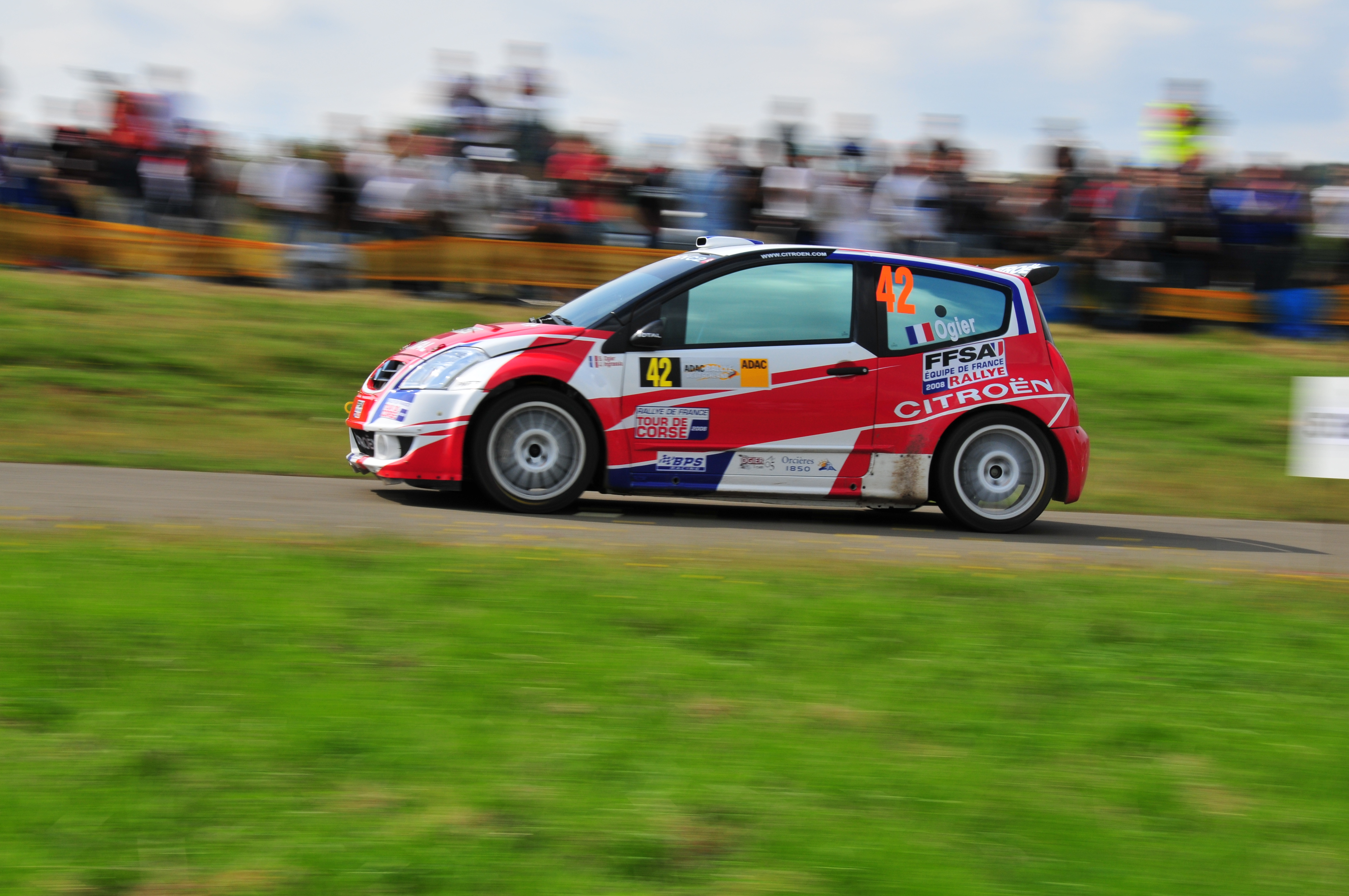
- Sébastien Ogier competing in a C2 S1600 at the 2008 Rallye Deutschland.
- Category: Super 1600
- Constructor: Citroën
- Predecessor: Citroën Saxo S1600
- Successor: Citroën DS3 R3

Technical specifications
- Length: 3,660 mm (144.1 in)
- Width: 1,795 mm (70.7 in)
- Wheelbase: 2,326 mm (91.6 in)
- Weight: 1,000 kg (2,204.6 lb)

Competition history
- Notable drivers: (Spain) Daniel Sordo (France) Sébastien Ogier (Czech Republic) Martin Prokop
- Debut: (Spain) 2004 Rally Catalunya
- Constructors' Championships: 2 (2005, 2008) JWRC
- Drivers' Championships: 3 (2005, 2008, 2009), JWRC

Citroën C2 S1600 is a rally car built by Citroën and based upon the Citroën C2 car. It is built to Super 1600 regulations. The car made its debut at the 2004 Rally Catalunya.

After the success of Citroën's Xsara in the World Rally Championship (WRC), Citroën expanded their interests to achieve success not only in the WRC but in the support championship, the Junior World Rally Championship (JWRC) in 2004. The earlier Citroën Saxo S1600 JWRC car was highly successful.

The car won the JWRC title with Sébastien Loeb in 2001, and brought him to the attention of Citroën Total World Rally Team, and again with Daniel Solà in 2002. With the new C2 replacing the aging Saxo, Citroën concentrated upon making their new car a winner.

Using a heavily modified C2 to create the Citroën C2 S1600, the works team and Dani Sordo succeeded in winning the championship in 2005. The C2 S1600 has continued to compete in the championship with privateer teams and remains successful despite newer machinery from Suzuki, Renault, and Fiat-work teams.

In the season of 2008, Sébastien Ogier brought the Citroën C2 its second junior title, and in 2009, the C2 was again the title-winning car, with Martin Prokop taking the championship.
