= Gigi Galli =

Italian rally driver (born 1973)

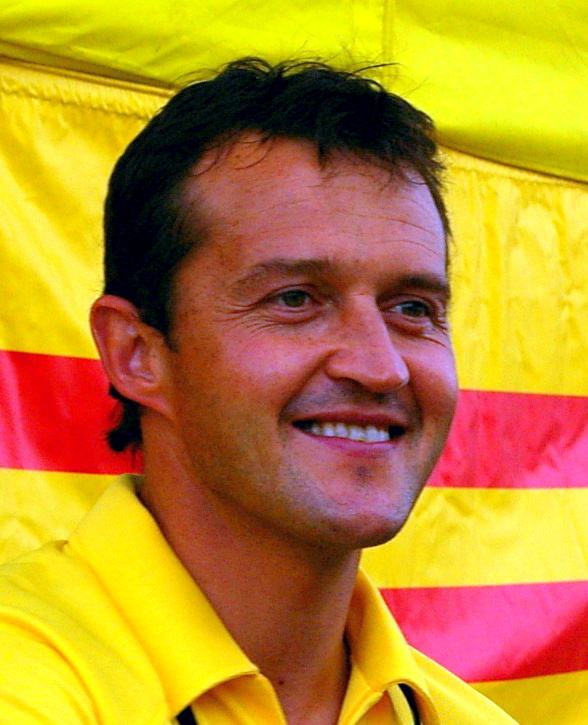

Personal information
- Nationality: (Italy) Italian
- Born: 13 January 1973 (age 53)

World Rally Championship record
- Years active: 1998–2008
- Co-driver: (Italy) Guido D'Amore (Italy) Nicola Arena (Italy) Flavio Zanella (Italy) Maurizio Messina (Italy) Giovanni Bernacchini (Italy) Rudy Pollet
- Teams: Stobart Ford, Mitsubishi, Bozian Racing
- Rallies: 66
- Championships: 0
- Rally wins: 0
- Podiums: 2
- Stage wins: 23
- Total points: 56
- First rally: 1998 San Remo Rally
- Last rally: 2008 Rally Deutschland

Gianluigi Galli (born 13 January 1973), commonly known as Gigi Galli, is an Italian rally driver, best known for his spectacular driving style. He comes from and lives in Livigno, Italy.

== Career ==
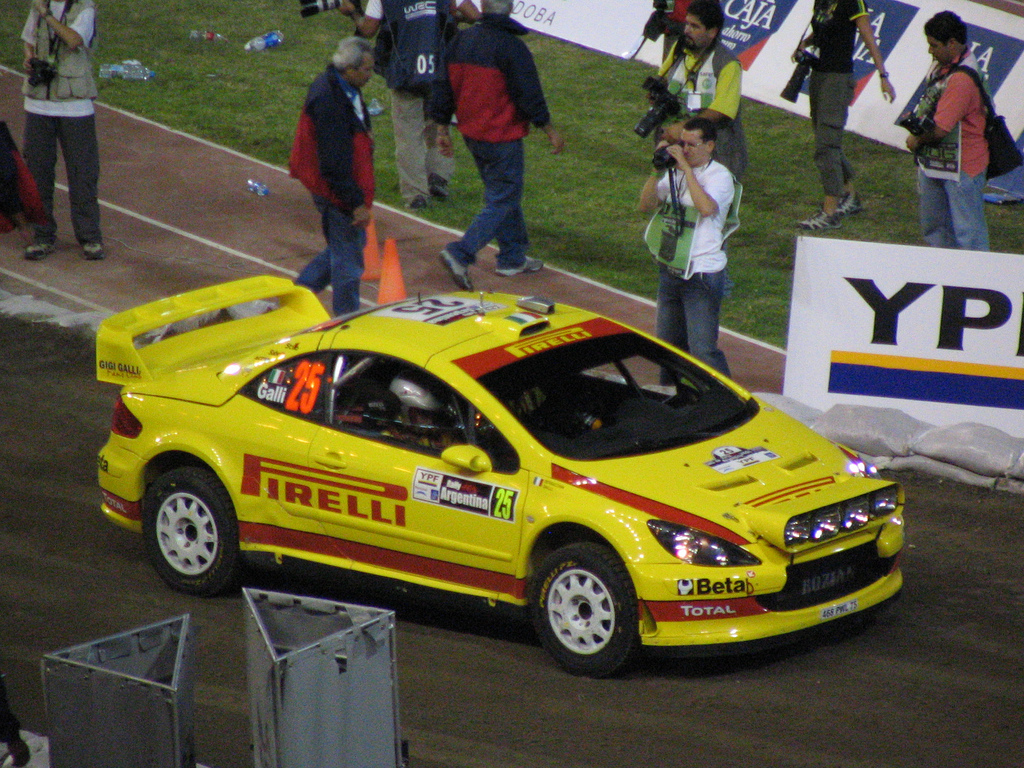
Galli at the 2006 Rally Argentina.

Galli debuted in the World Rally Championship at the 1998 San Remo Rally with a Group N Mitsubishi Carisma GT. His first world rally with a WRC car was the 2004 Monte Carlo Rally. In 2005, Galli drove for Mitsubishi and competed in 13 events with a Mitsubishi Lancer WRC05. He finished 11th in the drivers' world championship. In 2006, he drove a Peugeot 307 WRC in six world rallies. He achieved his first podium place by finishing third in the Rally Argentina.

In the 2007 season, Galli competed in three rallies with a Citroën Xsara WRC for the Italian privateer outfit Aimont Racing. His best result was sixth at the Rally Norway.

In 2008 Galli drove for the Stobart Ford team in all rounds of the WRC, replacing Jari-Matti Latvala. His first outing with the new team, after 10 months of absence in the series, was quite successful - Galli managed to score 3 points in the drivers' and manufacturers' championship by finishing sixth overall. The Italian had some problems with the power steering on day two, which cost him over a minute, but he was able to keep a good position. In Sweden, after three days of consistent pace, Galli equalled his best WRC result, finishing third and scoring another 6 points, which gave him fourth position in the drivers' championship after two rounds.

After Rally Finland, Galli was eighth in the drivers' championship, only three points behind teammate Henning Solberg. However, at the following event, the 2008 Rallye Deutschland, Galli crashed heavily, fracturing his left femur. As the recovery was expected to take five months, Galli would miss the last five rallies of the season.

== Results ==
=== Complete World Rally Championship results ===
Year	Entrant	Car	1	2	3	4	5	6	7	8	9	10	11	12	13	14	15	16	WDC	Points
1998	Ralliart Italia	Mitsubishi Carisma	MON	SWE	KEN	POR	ESP	FRA	ARG	GRC	NZL	FIN	ITA; 19	AUS	GBR				-	0
1999	Gianluigi Galli	Mitsubishi Carisma GT Evo IV	MON	SWE; 23	KEN	POR; Ret													-	0
1999	Gianluigi Galli	Mitsubishi Carisma GT Evo V					ESP; Ret					FIN; 25	CHN	ITA; 22	AUS	GBR			-	0
1999	Gianluigi Galli	Mitsubishi Carisma GT Evo VI						FRA; Ret	ARG	GRC	NZL								-	0
2000	Vieffe Corse Srl	Mitsubishi Lancer Evo V	MON; 12	SWE; 26	KEN	POR; Ret	ESP	ARG	GRE	NZL	FIN; 27	CYP							-	0
2000	Vieffe Corse Srl	Mitsubishi Lancer Evo VI											FRA; Ret	ITA; 22	AUS	GBR			-	0
2001	Gianluigi Galli	Mitsubishi Lancer Evo VI	MON; Ret	SWE	POR	ESP	ARG	CYP	GRE	KEN									-	0
2001	Gianluigi Galli	Mitsubishi Lancer Evo V									FIN; Ret	NZL	ITA	FRA	AUS	GBR			-	0
2002	Gianluigi Galli	Fiat Punto S1600	MON	SWE	FRA	ESP; 23	CYP	ARG	GRE; Ret	KEN	FIN	GER; Ret	ITA; 19	NZL	AUS	GBR			-	0
2003	Gianluigi Galli	Mitsubishi Lancer Evo VII	MON	SWE; 22	TUR	NZL	ARG	GRE	CYP	GER	FIN; 21	AUS	ITA	FRA; Ret	ESP	GBR			-	0
2004	Mitsubishi Motors	Mitsubishi Lancer WRC04	MON; Ret		MEX; Ret				TUR; 10								ESP; 7		15th	5
2004	Gianluigi Galli	Mitsubishi Lancer Evo VII		SWE; 24		NZL; Ret	CYP	GRE		ARG; Ret	FIN; 14	GER; Ret	JPN	GBR		FRA; Ret		AUS; Ret	15th	5
2004	Gianluigi Galli	Mitsubishi Lancer Evo VIII													ITA; 6				15th	5
2005	Mitsubishi Motors	Mitsubishi Lancer WRC05	MON	SWE; 7	MEX	NZL; 8	ITA; Ret	CYP	TUR; 8	GRE; 7	ARG; Ret	FIN; Ret	GER; 5	GBR; 13	JPN; Ret	FRA; 9	ESP; Ret	AUS; 5	11th	14
2006	Gianluigi Galli	Mitsubishi Lancer WRC05	MON; Ret	SWE; 4	MEX	ESP													11th	15
2006	Gianluigi Galli	Peugeot 307 WRC					FRA; 9	ARG; 3	ITA; Ret	GRE	GER	FIN; 5	JPN	CYP	TUR	AUS	NZL	GBR	11th	15
2007	Gianluigi Galli	Citroën Xsara WRC	MON	SWE; 13	NOR; 6	MEX													15th	5
2007	Aimont Racing Team	Citroën Xsara WRC					POR; 7	ARG	ITA	GRE	FIN	GER	NZL	ESP	FRA	JPN	IRE	GBR	15th	5
2008	Stobart VK M-Sport Ford Rally Team	Ford Focus RS WRC 07	MON; 6	SWE; 3	MEX; Ret	ARG; 7	JOR; 8	ITA; 4	GRE; Ret	TUR; Ret	FIN; Ret	GER; Ret	NZL	ESP	FRA	JPN	GBR		9th	17

=== Complete FIA World Rallycross Championship results ===
Supercar

Year	Entrant	Car	1	2	3	4	5	6	7	8	9	10	11	12	13	WRX	Points
2014	Olsbergs MSE	Ford Fiesta ST	POR	GBR	NOR	FIN	SWE	BEL	CAN	FRA	GER	ITA; 8	TUR	ARG		34th	9
2015	Gigi Galli	Kia Rio	POR	HOC	BEL	GBR	GER	SWE	CAN	NOR	FRA	BAR	TUR	ITA; 22	ARG	40th	0
2016	Gigi Galli	Kia Rio	POR	HOC	BEL	GBR	NOR	SWE	CAN	FRA	BAR	LAT; 20	GER	ARG		32nd	0
