= 2005 Rally Argentina =

9th round of the 2005 World Rally Championship

2005 Rally Argentina 25th Rally Argentina
Round 9 of the 2005 World Rally Championship season
← Previous event	Next event →
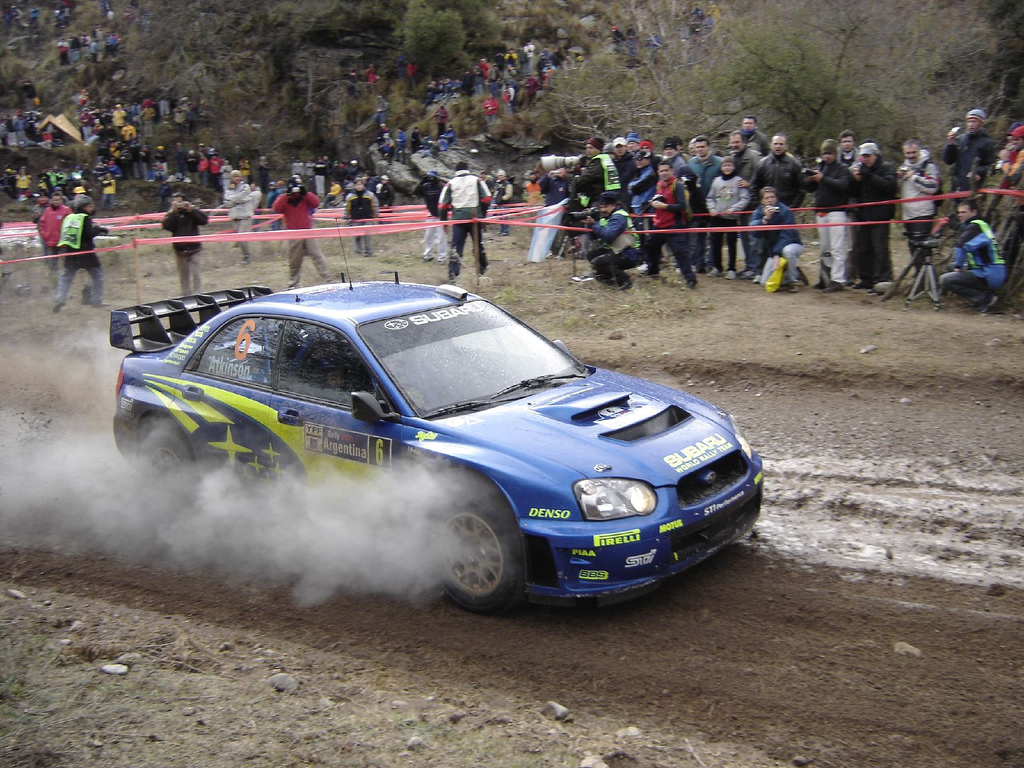
- Chris Atkinson driving a Subaru Impreza WRC at the 2005 Rally Argentina.
- Host country: Argentina
- Rally base: Villa Carlos Paz
- Dates run: July 14, 2005 – July 17, 2005
- Stages: 22 (340.82 km; 211.78 miles)
- Stage surface: Gravel
- Overall distance: 1,218.54 km (757.17 miles)

Statistics
- Crews: 72 at start, 45 at finish

Overall results
- Overall winner: (France) Sébastien Loeb (Monaco) Daniel Elena (France) Citroën Total WRT; Citroën Xsara WRC

The 2005 Rally Argentina (formally the 25th Rally Argentina) was the ninth round of the 2005 World Rally Championship. The rally was held over four days between 14 July and 17 July 2005, and was won by Citroën's Sébastien Loeb, his 17th win in the World Rally Championship, extending his record streak to six consecutive wins.

== Background ==
=== Entry list ===
No.	Driver	Co-Driver	Entrant	Car	Tyre
World Rally Championship manufacturer entries
1	(France) Sébastien Loeb	(Monaco) Daniel Elena	(France) Citroën Total WRT	Citroën Xsara WRC	MI
2	(Belgium) François Duval	(Belgium) Sven Smeets	(France) Citroën Total WRT	Citroën Xsara WRC	MI
3	(Finland) Toni Gardemeister	(Finland) Jakke Honkanen	(United Kingdom) BP Ford World Rally Team	Ford Focus RS WRC '04	MI
4	(Czech Republic) Roman Kresta	(Czech Republic) Jan Možný	(United Kingdom) BP Ford World Rally Team	Ford Focus RS WRC '04	MI
5	(Norway) Petter Solberg	(United Kingdom) Phil Mills	(Japan) Subaru World Rally Team	Subaru Impreza S11 WRC '05	P
6	(Australia) Chris Atkinson	(Australia) Glenn Macneall	(Japan) Subaru World Rally Team	Subaru Impreza S11 WRC '05	P
7	(Finland) Marcus Grönholm	(Finland) Timo Rautiainen	(France) Marlboro Peugeot Total	Peugeot 307 WRC	P
8	(Estonia) Markko Märtin	(United Kingdom) Michael Park	(France) Marlboro Peugeot Total	Peugeot 307 WRC	P
9	(Finland) Harri Rovanperä	(Finland) Risto Pietiläinen	(Japan) Mitsubishi Motors	Mitsubishi Lancer WRC 05	P
10	(Italy) Gianluigi Galli	(Italy) Guido D'Amore	(Japan) Mitsubishi Motors	Mitsubishi Lancer WRC 05	P
11	(Germany) Armin Schwarz	(Germany) Klaus Wicha	(Czech Republic) Škoda Motorsport	Škoda Fabia WRC	MI
12	(Finland) Jani Paasonen	(Finland) Jani Vainikka	(Czech Republic) Škoda Motorsport	Škoda Fabia WRC	MI
World Rally Championship entries
14	(Germany) Antony Warmbold	(United Kingdom) Michael Orr	(United Kingdom) BP Ford World Rally Team	Ford Focus RS WRC '04	MI
15	(Argentina) Luis Pérez Companc	(Argentina) Jose Maria Volta	(United Kingdom) BP Ford World Rally Team	Ford Focus RS WRC '04	MI
16	(Austria) Manfred Stohl	(Austria) Ilka Minor	(Belgium) OMV World Rally Team	Citroën Xsara WRC	MI
17	(Spain) Xavier Pons	(Spain) Carlos del Barrio	(Belgium) OMV World Rally Team	Citroën Xsara WRC	MI
18	(Sweden) Daniel Carlsson	(Sweden) Mattias Andersson	(France) Bozian Racing	Peugeot 206 WRC	MI
19	(Argentina) Marcos Ligato	(Argentina) Rubén García	(France) Bozian Racing	Peugeot 206 WRC	MI
20	(Argentina) Juan Pablo Raies	(Argentina) Jorge Perez Companc	(Argentina) Juan Pablo Raies	Subaru Impreza S9 WRC '03	—N/a
21	(Mexico) Ricardo Triviño	(Argentina) Claudio Bustos	(Mexico) Ricardo Triviño	—N/a	MI
67	(Argentina) Martin Galluser	(Argentina) Juan Carlos Uberti	(Argentina) Martin Galluser	Mitsubishi Lancer Evo VI	—N/a
PWRC entries
33	(Qatar) Nasser Al-Attiyah	(United Kingdom) Chris Patterson	(Qatar) Nasser Al-Attiyah	Subaru Impreza STI N11	—N/a
37	(United Kingdom) Mark Higgins	(United Kingdom) Trevor Agnew	(United Kingdom) Mark Higgins	Subaru Impreza STI N11	P
38	(Italy) Fabio Frisiero	(Italy) Giovanni Agnese	(Italy) Fabio Frisiero	Subaru Impreza STI N10	P
40	(Argentina) Gabriel Pozzo	(Argentina) Daniel Stillo	Subaru Argentina Rally Team	Subaru Impreza STI N11	—N/a
42	(Argentina) Federico Villagra	(Argentina) Javier Villagra	(Argentina) Federico Villagra	Mitsubishi Lancer Evo VIII	SS
43	(Italy) Angelo Medeghini	(Italy) Barbara Capoferri	(Italy) Angelo Medeghini	Mitsubishi Lancer Evo VIII	P
44	(Argentina) Sebastián Beltrán	(Argentina) Edgardo Galindo	Subaru Argentina Rally Team	Subaru Impreza STI N11	—N/a
48	(Chile) Luis Ignacio Rosselot	(Chile) Ricardo Rojas	(Chile) Luis Ignacio Rosselot	Mitsubishi Lancer Evo VIII	—N/a
51	(France) Brice Tirabassi	(France) Mathieu Baumel	(France) Brice Tirabassi	Subaru Impreza STI N11	—N/a

=== Itinerary ===
All dates and times are ART (UTC−3).

Date	Time	No.	Stage name	Distance
1. leg — 162.34 km
14 July	19:05	SS1	Pro Racing 1	3.02 km
14 July	19:10	SS2	Pro Racing 2	3.02 km
15 July	08:27	SS3	Carlos Paz — Cabalango 1	14.51 km
15 July	09:53	SS4	La Cumbre — Agua de Oro 1	21.18 km
15 July	10:43	SS5	Ascochinga — La Cumbre 1	28.74 km
15 July	11:46	SS6	Villa Giardino — La Falda 1	15.50 km
15 July	14:44	SS7	La Cumbre — Agua de Oro 2	21.18 km
15 July	15:34	SS8	Ascochinga — La Cumbre 2	28.74 km
15 July	16:37	SS9	Villa Giardino — La Falda 2	15.50 km
15 July	17:09	SS10	Valle Hermoso — Casa Grande 1	10.95 km
2. leg — 114.35 km
16 July	09:00	SS11	Santa Rosa de Calamuchita — San Agustin 1	21.41 km
16 July	09:53	SS12	Las Bajadas — Villa del Dique	16.35 km
16 July	10:39	SS13	Amboy — Santa Monica	20.29 km
16 July	11:59	SS14	Santa Rosa de Calamuchita — San Agustin 2	21.41 km
16 July	15:14	SS15	Carlos Paz — Cabalango 2	14.51 km
16 July	15:47	SS16	Tanti — Cosquin	9.43 km
16 July	16:40	SS17	Valle Hermoso — Casa Grande 2	10.95 km
3. leg — 64.13 km
17 July	08:30	SS18	El Condor — Copina 1	16.82 km
17 July	10:10	SS19	Mina Clavero — Giulio Cesare	24.45 km
17 July	10:57	SS20	El Condor — Copina 2	16.82 km
17 July	13:05	SS21	Pro Racing 3	3.02 km
17 July	13:10	SS22	Pro Racing 4	3.02 km

== Results ==
=== Overall ===
Pos.	No.	Driver	Co-driver	Team	Car	Time	Difference	Points
1	1	(France) Sébastien Loeb	(Monaco) Daniel Elena	(France) Citroën Total WRT	Citroën Xsara WRC	3:55:36.4		10
2	7	(Finland) Marcus Grönholm	(Finland) Timo Rautiainen	(France) Marlboro Peugeot Total	Peugeot 307 WRC	3:56:02.5	+26.1	8
3	5	(Norway) Petter Solberg	(United Kingdom) Phil Mills	(Japan) Subaru World Rally Team	Subaru Impreza S11 WRC '05	3:56:41.7	+1:05.3	6
4	3	(Finland) Toni Gardemeister	(Finland) Jakke Honkanen	(United Kingdom) BP Ford World Rally Team	Ford Focus RS WRC '04	3:58:14.4	+2:38.0	5
5	9	(Finland) Harri Rovanperä	(Finland) Risto Pietiläinen	(Japan) Mitsubishi Motors	Mitsubishi Lancer WRC 05	3:58:20.0	+2:43.6	4
6	8	(Estonia) Markko Märtin	(United Kingdom) Michael Park	(France) Marlboro Peugeot Total	Peugeot 307 WRC	3:59:58.6	+4:22.2	3
7	2	(Belgium) François Duval	(Belgium) Sven Smeets	(France) Citroën Total WRT	Citroën Xsara WRC	4:01:05.5	+5:29.1	2
8	16	(Austria) Manfred Stohl	(Austria) Ilka Minor	(Belgium) OMV World Rally Team	Citroën Xsara WRC	4:01:19.3	+5:42.9	1

=== World Rally Cars ===
==== Classification ====
Position		No.	Driver	Co-driver	Entrant	Car	Time	Difference	Points
Event	Class	No.	Driver	Co-driver	Entrant	Car	Time	Difference	Points
1	1	1	(France) Sébastien Loeb	(Monaco) Daniel Elena	(France) Citroën Total WRT	Citroën Xsara WRC	3:55:36.4		10
2	2	7	(Finland) Marcus Grönholm	(Finland) Timo Rautiainen	(France) Marlboro Peugeot Total	Peugeot 307 WRC	3:56:02.5	+26.1	8
3	3	5	(Norway) Petter Solberg	(United Kingdom) Phil Mills	(Japan) Subaru World Rally Team	Subaru Impreza S11 WRC '05	3:56:41.7	+1:05.3	6
4	4	3	(Finland) Toni Gardemeister	(Finland) Jakke Honkanen	(United Kingdom) BP Ford World Rally Team	Ford Focus RS WRC '04	3:58:14.4	+2:38.0	5
5	5	9	(Finland) Harri Rovanperä	(Finland) Risto Pietiläinen	(Japan) Mitsubishi Motors	Mitsubishi Lancer WRC 05	3:58:20.0	+2:43.6	4
6	6	8	(Estonia) Markko Märtin	(United Kingdom) Michael Park	(France) Marlboro Peugeot Total	Peugeot 307 WRC	3:59:58.6	+4:22.2	3
7	7	2	(Belgium) François Duval	(Belgium) Sven Smeets	(France) Citroën Total WRT	Citroën Xsara WRC	4:01:05.5	+5:29.1	2
9	8	6	(Australia) Chris Atkinson	(Australia) Glenn Macneall	(Japan) Subaru World Rally Team	Subaru Impreza S11 WRC '05	4:01:35.6	+5:59.2	0
11	9	4	(Czech Republic) Roman Kresta	(Czech Republic) Jan Možný	(United Kingdom) BP Ford World Rally Team	Ford Focus RS WRC '04	4:04:14.6	+8:38.2	0
16	10	11	(Germany) Armin Schwarz	(Germany) Klaus Wicha	(Czech Republic) Škoda Motorsport	Škoda Fabia WRC	4:17:25.4	+21:49.0	0
Retired SS20		10	(Italy) Gianluigi Galli	(Italy) Guido D'Amore	(Japan) Mitsubishi Motors	Mitsubishi Lancer WRC 05	Mechanical		0
Retired SS5		12	(Finland) Jani Paasonen	(Finland) Jani Vainikka	(Czech Republic) Škoda Motorsport	Škoda Fabia WRC	Mechanical		0

==== Special stages ====
Day	Stage	Stage name	Length	Winner	Car	Time	Class leaders
1. leg (14 Jul)	SS1	Pro Racing 1	3.02 km	(Finland) Marcus Grönholm	Peugeot 307 WRC	2:09.3	(Finland) Marcus Grönholm
1. leg (14 Jul)	SS2	Pro Racing 2	3.02 km	(Norway) Petter Solberg	Subaru Impreza S11 WRC '05	2:09.1	(Norway) Petter Solberg
1. leg (15 Jul)	SS3	Carlos Paz — Cabalango 1	14.51 km	(Norway) Petter Solberg	Subaru Impreza S11 WRC '05	9:51.7	(Norway) Petter Solberg
1. leg (15 Jul)	SS4	La Cumbre — Agua de Oro 1	21.18 km	(France) Sébastien Loeb	Citroën Xsara WRC	17:48.8	(Norway) Petter Solberg
1. leg (15 Jul)	SS5	Ascochinga — La Cumbre 1	28.74 km	(France) Sébastien Loeb	Citroën Xsara WRC	18:15.3	(France) Sébastien Loeb
1. leg (15 Jul)	SS6	Villa Giardino — La Falda 1	15.50 km	(France) Sébastien Loeb	Citroën Xsara WRC	10:50.8	(France) Sébastien Loeb
1. leg (15 Jul)	SS7	La Cumbre — Agua de Oro 2	21.18 km	(Finland) Marcus Grönholm	Peugeot 307 WRC	17:33.2	(France) Sébastien Loeb
1. leg (15 Jul)	SS8	Ascochinga — La Cumbre 2	28.74 km	(France) Sébastien Loeb	Citroën Xsara WRC	17:57.7	(France) Sébastien Loeb
1. leg (15 Jul)	SS9	Villa Giardino — La Falda 2	15.50 km	(France) Sébastien Loeb	Citroën Xsara WRC	10:53.3	(France) Sébastien Loeb
1. leg (15 Jul)	SS10	Valle Hermoso — Casa Grande 1	10.95 km	(France) Sébastien Loeb	Citroën Xsara WRC	7:02.6	(France) Sébastien Loeb
2. leg (16 Jul)	SS11	Santa Rosa de Calamuchita — San Agustin 1	21.41 km	(Norway) Petter Solberg	Subaru Impreza S11 WRC '05	13:04.3	(France) Sébastien Loeb
2. leg (16 Jul)	SS12	Las Bajadas — Villa del Dique	16.35 km	(Finland) Marcus Grönholm	Peugeot 307 WRC	8:41.0	(France) Sébastien Loeb
2. leg (16 Jul)	SS13	Amboy — Santa Monica	20.29 km	(Finland) Marcus Grönholm	Peugeot 307 WRC	10:26.5	(France) Sébastien Loeb
2. leg (16 Jul)	SS14	Santa Rosa de Calamuchita — San Agustin 2	21.41 km	(Finland) Marcus Grönholm	Peugeot 307 WRC	12:59.0	(France) Sébastien Loeb
2. leg (16 Jul)	SS15	Carlos Paz — Cabalango 2	14.51 km	(France) Sébastien Loeb	Citroën Xsara WRC	9:56.4	(France) Sébastien Loeb
2. leg (16 Jul)	SS16	Tanti — Cosquin	9.43 km	(France) Sébastien Loeb	Citroën Xsara WRC	5:53.4	(France) Sébastien Loeb
2. leg (16 Jul)	SS17	Valle Hermoso — Casa Grande 2	10.95 km	(Finland) Marcus Grönholm	Peugeot 307 WRC	7:41.0	(France) Sébastien Loeb
3. leg (17 Jul)	SS18	El Condor — Copina 1	16.82 km	(France) Sébastien Loeb	Citroën Xsara WRC	13:45.5	(France) Sébastien Loeb
3. leg (17 Jul)	SS19	Mina Clavero — Giulio Cesare	24.45 km	(Finland) Toni Gardemeister	Ford Focus RS WRC '04	19:48.4	(France) Sébastien Loeb
3. leg (17 Jul)	SS20	El Condor — Copina 2	16.82 km	(Norway) Petter Solberg	Subaru Impreza S11 WRC '05	13:36.8	(France) Sébastien Loeb
3. leg (17 Jul)	SS21	Pro Racing 3	3.02 km	(Finland) Harri Rovanperä	Mitsubishi Lancer WRC 05	2:09.3	(France) Sébastien Loeb
3. leg (17 Jul)	SS22	Pro Racing 4	3.02 km	(Norway) Petter Solberg	Subaru Impreza S11 WRC '05	2:08.9	(France) Sébastien Loeb

==== Championship standings ====
Pos.	Drivers' championships			Co-drivers' championships			Manufacturers' championships		
Pos.	Move	Driver	Points	Move	Co-driver	Points	Move	Manufacturer	Points
1		(France) Sébastien Loeb	75		(Monaco) Daniel Elena	75		(France) Citroën Total WRT	96
2		(Norway) Petter Solberg	48		(United Kingdom) Phil Mills	48		(France) Marlboro Peugeot Total	90
3	2	(Finland) Marcus Grönholm	45	2	(Finland) Timo Rautiainen	45		(United Kingdom) BP Ford World Rally Team	62
4	1	(Finland) Toni Gardemeister	44	1	(Finland) Jakke Honkanen	44		(Japan) Subaru World Rally Team	54
5	1	(Estonia) Markko Märtin	42	1	(United Kingdom) Michael Park	42		(Japan) Mitsubishi Motors	41

=== Production World Rally Championship ===
==== Classification ====
Position		No.	Driver	Co-driver	Entrant	Car	Time	Difference	Points
Event	Class	No.	Driver	Co-driver	Entrant	Car	Time	Difference	Points
17	1	33	(Qatar) Nasser Al-Attiyah	(United Kingdom) Chris Patterson	(Qatar) Nasser Al-Attiyah	Subaru Impreza STI N11	4:21:41.6		10
19	2	43	(Italy) Angelo Medeghini	(Italy) Barbara Capoferri	(Italy) Angelo Medeghini	Mitsubishi Lancer Evo VIII	4:35:10.4	+13:28.8	8
20	3	48	(Chile) Luis Ignacio Rosselot	(Chile) Ricardo Rojas	(Chile) Luis Ignacio Rosselot	Mitsubishi Lancer Evo VIII	4:35:29.8	+13:48.2	6
22	4	38	(Italy) Fabio Frisiero	(Italy) Giovanni Agnese	(Italy) Fabio Frisiero	Subaru Impreza STI N10	4:46:50.3	+25:08.7	5
23	5	40	(Argentina) Gabriel Pozzo	(Argentina) Daniel Stillo	Subaru Argentina Rally Team	Subaru Impreza STI N11	4:47:15.3	+25:33.7	4
24	6	44	(Argentina) Sebastián Beltrán	(Argentina) Edgardo Galindo	Subaru Argentina Rally Team	Subaru Impreza STI N11	4:51:34.0	+29:52.4	3
Retired SS22		37	(United Kingdom) Mark Higgins	(United Kingdom) Trevor Agnew	(United Kingdom) Mark Higgins	Subaru Impreza STI N11	Excluded		0
Retired SS22		42	(Argentina) Federico Villagra	(Argentina) Javier Villagra	(Argentina) Federico Villagra	Mitsubishi Lancer Evo VIII	Excluded		0
Retired SS8		51	(France) Brice Tirabassi	(France) Mathieu Baumel	(France) Brice Tirabassi	Subaru Impreza STI N11	Mechanical		0

==== Special stages ====
Day	Stage	Stage name	Length	Winner	Car	Time	Class leaders
1. leg (14 Jul)	SS1	Pro Racing 1	3.02 km	(Argentina) Federico Villagra	Mitsubishi Lancer Evo VIII	2:23.6	(Argentina) Federico Villagra
1. leg (14 Jul)	SS2	Pro Racing 2	3.02 km	(Argentina) Federico Villagra	Mitsubishi Lancer Evo VIII	2:24.6	(Argentina) Federico Villagra
1. leg (15 Jul)	SS3	Carlos Paz — Cabalango 1	14.51 km	(United Kingdom) Mark Higgins	Subaru Impreza STI N11	11:01.6	(United Kingdom) Mark Higgins
1. leg (15 Jul)	SS4	La Cumbre — Agua de Oro 1	21.18 km	(United Kingdom) Mark Higgins	Subaru Impreza STI N11	19:16.1	(United Kingdom) Mark Higgins
1. leg (15 Jul)	SS5	Ascochinga — La Cumbre 1	28.74 km	(Argentina) Federico Villagra	Mitsubishi Lancer Evo VIII	19:46.5	(United Kingdom) Mark Higgins
1. leg (15 Jul)	SS6	Villa Giardino — La Falda 1	15.50 km	(Qatar) Nasser Al-Attiyah	Subaru Impreza STI N11	12:10.7	(United Kingdom) Mark Higgins
1. leg (15 Jul)	SS7	La Cumbre — Agua de Oro 2	21.18 km	(United Kingdom) Mark Higgins	Subaru Impreza STI N11	19:00.4	(United Kingdom) Mark Higgins
1. leg (15 Jul)	SS8	Ascochinga — La Cumbre 2	28.74 km	(Qatar) Nasser Al-Attiyah	Subaru Impreza STI N11	19:41.6	(Qatar) Nasser Al-Attiyah
1. leg (15 Jul)	SS9	Villa Giardino — La Falda 2	15.50 km	(Qatar) Nasser Al-Attiyah	Subaru Impreza STI N11	12:19.6	(Qatar) Nasser Al-Attiyah
1. leg (15 Jul)	SS10	Valle Hermoso — Casa Grande 1	10.95 km	(Qatar) Nasser Al-Attiyah	Subaru Impreza STI N11	7:51.5	(Qatar) Nasser Al-Attiyah
2. leg (16 Jul)	SS11	Santa Rosa de Calamuchita — San Agustin 1	21.41 km	(Argentina) Gabriel Pozzo	Subaru Impreza STI N11	14:22.3	(Qatar) Nasser Al-Attiyah
2. leg (16 Jul)	SS12	Las Bajadas — Villa del Dique	16.35 km	(Argentina) Gabriel Pozzo	Subaru Impreza STI N11	9:37.2	(Qatar) Nasser Al-Attiyah
2. leg (16 Jul)	SS13	Amboy — Santa Monica	20.29 km	(Argentina) Gabriel Pozzo	Subaru Impreza STI N11	11:39.1	(Qatar) Nasser Al-Attiyah
2. leg (16 Jul)	SS14	Santa Rosa de Calamuchita — San Agustin 2	21.41 km	(Argentina) Gabriel Pozzo	Subaru Impreza STI N11	14:12.8	(Qatar) Nasser Al-Attiyah
2. leg (16 Jul)	SS15	Carlos Paz — Cabalango 2	14.51 km	(Argentina) Gabriel Pozzo	Subaru Impreza STI N11	11:03.9	(Qatar) Nasser Al-Attiyah
2. leg (16 Jul)	SS16	Tanti — Cosquin	9.43 km	(Argentina) Federico Villagra	Mitsubishi Lancer Evo VIII	6:24.8	(Qatar) Nasser Al-Attiyah
2. leg (16 Jul)	SS17	Valle Hermoso — Casa Grande 2	10.95 km	(Argentina) Gabriel Pozzo	Subaru Impreza STI N11	8:31.0	(Qatar) Nasser Al-Attiyah
3. leg (17 Jul)	SS18	El Condor — Copina 1	16.82 km	(Argentina) Gabriel Pozzo	Subaru Impreza STI N11	14:29.0	(Qatar) Nasser Al-Attiyah
3. leg (17 Jul)	SS19	Mina Clavero — Giulio Cesare	24.45 km	(Argentina) Federico Villagra	Mitsubishi Lancer Evo VIII	21:01.4	(Qatar) Nasser Al-Attiyah
3. leg (17 Jul)	SS20	El Condor — Copina 2	16.82 km	(Argentina) Federico Villagra	Mitsubishi Lancer Evo VIII	14:38.2	(Qatar) Nasser Al-Attiyah
3. leg (17 Jul)	SS21	Pro Racing 3	3.02 km	(United Kingdom) Mark Higgins	Subaru Impreza STI N11	2:24.5	(Qatar) Nasser Al-Attiyah
3. leg (17 Jul)	SS22	Pro Racing 4	3.02 km	(Italy) Angelo Medeghini	Mitsubishi Lancer Evo VIII	2:23.7	(Qatar) Nasser Al-Attiyah

==== Championship standings ====
Pos.	Drivers' championships		
Pos.	Move	Driver	Points
1		(Japan) Toshihiro Arai	30
2	2	(Qatar) Nasser Al-Attiyah	25
3	1	(Spain) Xavier Pons	20
4	1	(Argentina) Marcos Ligato	20
5	3	(Italy) Angelo Medeghini	16
