= 2001 Monte Carlo Rally =

1st round of the 2001 World Rally Championship

2001 Monte Carlo Rally 69th Rallye Automobile de Monte-Carlo
Round 1 of the 2001 World Rally Championship season
Next event →
- Host country: Monaco
- Rally base: Monaco
- Dates run: January 19, 2001 – January 21, 2001
- Stages: 15 (373.06 km; 231.81 miles)
- Stage surface: Asphalt/snow
- Overall distance: 1,738.81 km (1,080.45 miles)

Statistics
- Crews: 56 at start, 27 at finish

Overall results
- Overall winner: (Finland) Tommi Mäkinen (Finland) Risto Mannisenmäki (Japan) Marlboro Mitsubishi Ralliart; Mitsubishi Lancer Evo 6.5

The 2001 Monte Carlo Rally (formally the 69th Rallye Automobile de Monte-Carlo) was the first round of the 2001 World Rally Championship. The race was held over three days between 19 January and 21 January 2001, and was won by Mitsubishi's Tommi Mäkinen, his 21st win in the World Rally Championship.

== Background ==
=== Entry list ===
No.	Driver	Co-Driver	Entrant	Car	Tyre
World Rally Championship manufacturer entries
1	(Finland) Marcus Grönholm	(Finland) Timo Rautiainen	(France) Peugeot Total	Peugeot 206 WRC	M
2	(France) Didier Auriol	(France) Denis Giraudet	(France) Peugeot Total	Peugeot 206 WRC	M
3	(Spain) Carlos Sainz	(Spain) Luis Moya	(United Kingdom) Ford Motor Co. Ltd.	Ford Focus RS WRC '01	P
4	(United Kingdom) Colin McRae	(United Kingdom) Nicky Grist	(United Kingdom) Ford Motor Co. Ltd.	Ford Focus RS WRC '01	P
5	(United Kingdom) Richard Burns	(United Kingdom) Robert Reid	(Japan) Subaru World Rally Team	Subaru Impreza S7 WRC '01	P
6	(Estonia) Markko Märtin	(United Kingdom) Michael Park	(Japan) Subaru World Rally Team	Subaru Impreza S7 WRC '01	P
7	(Finland) Tommi Mäkinen	(Finland) Risto Mannisenmäki	(Japan) Marlboro Mitsubishi Ralliart	Mitsubishi Lancer Evo 6.5	M
8	(Belgium) Freddy Loix	(Belgium) Sven Smeets	(Japan) Marlboro Mitsubishi Ralliart	Mitsubishi Carisma GT Evo VI	M
9	(Italy) Piero Liatti	(Italy) Carlo Cassina	(South Korea) Hyundai Castrol World Rally Team	Hyundai Accent WRC	M
10	(United Kingdom) Alister McRae	(United Kingdom) David Senior	(South Korea) Hyundai Castrol World Rally Team	Hyundai Accent WRC	M
11	(Germany) Armin Schwarz	(Germany) Manfred Hiemer	(Czech Republic) Škoda Motorsport	Škoda Octavia WRC Evo2	M
12	(Belgium) Bruno Thiry	(Belgium) Stéphane Prévot	(Czech Republic) Škoda Motorsport	Škoda Octavia WRC Evo2	M
16	(France) Gilles Panizzi	(France) Hervé Panizzi	(France) Peugeot Total	Peugeot 206 WRC	M
18	(Norway) Petter Solberg	(United Kingdom) Phil Mills	(Japan) Subaru World Rally Team	Subaru Impreza S7 WRC '01	P
World Rally Championship entries
17	(France) François Delecour	(France) Daniel Grataloup	(United Kingdom) Ford Motor Co. Ltd.	Ford Focus RS WRC '01	P
19	(Finland) Toni Gardemeister	(Finland) Paavo Lukander	(Finland) Toni Gardemeister	Peugeot 206 WRC	M
22	(Italy) Piero Longhi	(Italy) Lucio Baggio	(Italy) Piero Longhi	Toyota Corolla WRC	M
28	(Switzerland) Olivier Burri	(Switzerland) Jean-Philippe Patthey	(Switzerland) Olivier Burri	Toyota Corolla WRC	P
30	(Italy) Pier Lorenzo Zanchi	(Italy) Dario D'Esposito	(Italy) Pier Lorenzo Zanchi	Toyota Corolla WRC	M
31	(Italy) Riccardo Errani	(Italy) Stefano Casadio	(Italy) Riccardo Errani	Subaru Impreza 555	—N/a
32	(Italy) Tobia Cavallini	(Italy) Bernardo Serra	(Italy) Tobia Cavallini	Subaru Impreza S5 WRC '99	—N/a
33	(Monaco) Richard Hein	(France) Philippe Servol	(Monaco) Richard Hein	Subaru Impreza S5 WRC '98	—N/a
Group N Cup entries
23	(Austria) Manfred Stohl	(Austria) Peter Müller	(Austria) Manfred Stohl	Mitsubishi Lancer Evo VI	P
24	(Uruguay) Gustavo Trelles	(Argentina) Jorge Del Buono	(Uruguay) Gustavo Trelles	Mitsubishi Lancer Evo VI	P
25	(Italy) Gianluigi Galli	(Italy) Giovanni Bernacchini	(Italy) Gianluigi Galli	Mitsubishi Lancer Evo VI	P
26	(Argentina) Gabriel Pozzo	(Argentina) Edgardo Galindo	(Argentina) Gabriel Pozzo	Mitsubishi Lancer Evo VI	P
44	(Switzerland) Olivier Gillet	(Monaco) Freddy Delorme	(Switzerland) Olivier Gillet	Mitsubishi Lancer Evo VI	M
45	(Italy) Giovanni Manfrinato	(Italy) Claudio Condotta	(Italy) Giovanni Manfrinato	Mitsubishi Lancer Evo VI	—N/a
46	(Germany) Hermann Gassner Sr.	(Germany) Siegfried Schrankl	(Germany) Hermann Gassner Sr.	Proton Pert Evo V	P
47	(Italy) Luca Baldini	(Italy) Massimiliano Cerrai	(Italy) Luca Baldini	Mitsubishi Lancer Evo VI	—N/a
48	(Italy) Marco Menegatto	(France) Christophe Berard	(Italy) Marco Menegatto	Mitsubishi Lancer Evo VI	—N/a
49	(Belgium) Bob Colsoul	(Belgium) Tom Colsoul	(Belgium) Bob Colsoul	Mitsubishi Lancer Evo V	—N/a
50	(France) Patrice Rouit	(France) Dominique Lamy	(France) Patrice Rouit	Mitsubishi Lancer Evo III	—N/a
52	(Italy) Norberto Cangani	(Italy) Eros Di Prima	(Italy) Norberto Cangani	Mitsubishi Lancer Evo VI	—N/a
53	(France) David Truphemus	(France) Pascal Saivre	(France) David Truphemus	Mitsubishi Lancer Evo VI	—N/a
54	(Argentina) Marcos Ligato	(Argentina) Rubén García	(Argentina) Marcos Ligato	Mitsubishi Lancer Evo VI	—N/a
57	(France) Christophe Arnaud	(France) Stéphane Arnaud	(France) Christophe Arnaud	Renault Clio RS	—N/a
58	(France) Nicolas Vouilloz	(France) Steeve Rebroin	(France) Nicolas Vouilloz	Renault Clio Williams	—N/a
59	(France) Frédéric Maniccia	(France) Richard Thaon	(France) Frédéric Maniccia	Renault Clio RS	—N/a
60	(Germany) Jürgen Barth	(France) Jean-Claude Perramond	(Germany) Jürgen Barth	Opel Astra OPC	—N/a
61	(France) Eddie Mercier	(France) Jean-Michel Veret	(France) Eddie Mercier	Renault Clio RS	M
62	(France) Nicolas Ressegaire	(France) Régis Ressegaire	(France) Nicolas Ressegaire	Renault Clio RS	—N/a
63	(Italy) Gabriele Cadringher	(Italy) Gianfranco Serembre	(Italy) Gabriele Cadringher	Opel Astra OPC	—N/a
64	(Monaco) Marc Dessi	(Monaco) Pamela Dessi	(Monaco) Marc Dessi	Peugeot 205 GTI 1.9	—N/a
65	(France) Jacques Courmontagne	(France) Josette Martin	(France) Jacques Courmontagne	Peugeot 106 XSI	—N/a

=== Itinerary ===
All dates and times are CET (UTC+1).

Date	Time	No.	Stage name	Distance
Leg 1 — 141.74 km
19 January	10:03	SS1	BIF. D5/D10 — Roquesteron 1	22.89 km
19 January	10:46	SS2	St. Pierre — Entrevaux 1	30.34 km
19 January	13:19	SS3	BIF. D5/D10 — Roquesteron 2	22.89 km
19 January	14:02	SS4	St. Pierre — Entrevaux 2	30.34 km
19 January	17:03	SS5	Comps — Castellane 1	20.53 km
19 January	18:09	SS6	Clumanc — Lambruisse 1	14.75 km
Leg 2 — 132.78 km
20 January	09:53	SS7	BIF. D1/C1 — Turriers	24.12 km
20 January	11:06	SS8	Sisteron — Thoard 1	36.69 km
20 January	13:34	SS9	Clumanc — Lambruisse 2	14.75 km
20 January	15:07	SS10	Comps — Castellane 2	20.53 km
20 January	18:00	SS11	Sisteron — Thoard 2	36.69 km
Leg 3 — 98.54 km
21 January	09:08	SS12	Sospel — La Bollène 1	32.72 km
21 January	10:03	SS13	Loda — Lucéram 1	16.55 km
21 January	12:28	SS14	Sospel — La Bollène 2	32.72 km
21 January	13:23	SS15	Loda — Lucéram 2	16.55 km

== Results ==
=== Overall ===
Pos.	No.	Driver	Co-driver	Team	Car	Time	Difference	Points
1	7	(Finland) Tommi Mäkinen	(Finland) Risto Mannisenmäki	(Japan) Marlboro Mitsubishi Ralliart	Mitsubishi Lancer Evo 6.5	4:38:04.3		10
2	3	(Spain) Carlos Sainz	(Spain) Luis Moya	(United Kingdom) Ford Motor Co. Ltd.	Ford Focus RS WRC '01	4:39:05.1	+1:00.8	6
3	17	(France) François Delecour	(France) Daniel Grataloup	(United Kingdom) Ford Motor Co. Ltd.	Ford Focus RS WRC '01	4:40:09.6	+2:05.3	4
4	11	(Germany) Armin Schwarz	(Germany) Manfred Hiemer	(Czech Republic) Škoda Motorsport	Škoda Octavia WRC Evo2	4:40:30.3	+2:26.0	3
5	19	(Finland) Toni Gardemeister	(Finland) Paavo Lukander	(Finland) Toni Gardemeister	Peugeot 206 WRC	4:43:56.4	+5:52.1	2
6	8	(Belgium) Freddy Loix	(Belgium) Sven Smeets	(Japan) Marlboro Mitsubishi Ralliart	Mitsubishi Carisma GT Evo VI	4:44:30.2	+6:25.9	1

=== World Rally Cars ===
==== Classification ====
Position		No.	Driver	Co-driver	Entrant	Car	Time	Difference	Points
Event	Class	No.	Driver	Co-driver	Entrant	Car	Time	Difference	Points
1	1	7	(Finland) Tommi Mäkinen	(Finland) Risto Mannisenmäki	(Japan) Marlboro Mitsubishi Ralliart	Mitsubishi Lancer Evo 6.5	4:38:04.3		10
2	2	3	(Spain) Carlos Sainz	(Spain) Luis Moya	(United Kingdom) Ford Motor Co. Ltd.	Ford Focus RS WRC '01	4:39:05.1	+1:00.8	6
4	3	11	(Germany) Armin Schwarz	(Germany) Manfred Hiemer	(Czech Republic) Škoda Motorsport	Škoda Octavia WRC Evo2	4:40:30.3	+2:26.0	3
6	4	8	(Belgium) Freddy Loix	(Belgium) Sven Smeets	(Japan) Marlboro Mitsubishi Ralliart	Mitsubishi Carisma GT Evo VI	4:44:30.2	+6:25.9	1
7	5	10	(United Kingdom) Alister McRae	(United Kingdom) David Senior	(South Korea) Hyundai Castrol World Rally Team	Hyundai Accent WRC	4:47:08.3	+9:04.0	0
8	6	12	(Belgium) Bruno Thiry	(Belgium) Stéphane Prévot	(Czech Republic) Škoda Motorsport	Škoda Octavia WRC Evo2	4:51:59.3	+13:55.0	0
Retired SS13		4	(United Kingdom) Colin McRae	(United Kingdom) Nicky Grist	(United Kingdom) Ford Motor Co. Ltd.	Ford Focus RS WRC '01	Mechanical		0
Retired SS7		5	(United Kingdom) Richard Burns	(United Kingdom) Robert Reid	(Japan) Subaru World Rally Team	Subaru Impreza S7 WRC '01	Mechanical		0
Retired SS5		18	(Norway) Petter Solberg	(United Kingdom) Phil Mills	(Japan) Subaru World Rally Team	Subaru Impreza S7 WRC '01	Accident		0
Retired SS4		2	(France) Didier Auriol	(France) Denis Giraudet	(France) Peugeot Total	Peugeot 206 WRC	Lost wheel		0
Retired SS3		1	(Finland) Marcus Grönholm	(Finland) Timo Rautiainen	(France) Peugeot Total	Peugeot 206 WRC	Water pump		0
Retired SS3		16	(France) Gilles Panizzi	(France) Hervé Panizzi	(France) Peugeot Total	Peugeot 206 WRC	Accident		0
Retired SS2		9	(Italy) Piero Liatti	(Italy) Carlo Cassina	(South Korea) Hyundai Castrol World Rally Team	Hyundai Accent WRC	Engine		0
Retired SS1		6	(Estonia) Markko Märtin	(United Kingdom) Michael Park	(Japan) Subaru World Rally Team	Subaru Impreza S7 WRC '01	Electrical		0

==== Special stages ====
Day	Stage	Stage name	Length	Winner	Car	Time	Class leaders
Leg 1 (19 Jan)	SS1	BIF. D5/D10 — Roquesteron 1	22.89 km	(Finland) Toni Gardemeister	Peugeot 206 WRC	20:48.9	(Finland) Toni Gardemeister
Leg 1 (19 Jan)	SS2	St. Pierre — Entrevaux 1	30.34 km	(Germany) Hermann Gassner Sr.	Proton Pert Evo V	25:38.5	(France) Didier Auriol
Leg 1 (19 Jan)	SS3	BIF. D5/D10 — Roquesteron 2	22.89 km	(France) François Delecour	Ford Focus RS WRC '01	18:32.7	(France) Didier Auriol
Leg 1 (19 Jan)	SS4	St. Pierre — Entrevaux 2	30.34 km	(United Kingdom) Colin McRae	Ford Focus RS WRC '01	22:10.4	(United Kingdom) Colin McRae
Leg 1 (19 Jan)	SS5	Comps — Castellane 1	20.53 km	(Finland) Tommi Mäkinen	Mitsubishi Lancer Evo 6.5	13:45.4	(United Kingdom) Colin McRae
Leg 1 (19 Jan)	SS6	Clumanc — Lambruisse 1	14.75 km	(Spain) Carlos Sainz	Ford Focus RS WRC '01	10:32.5	(United Kingdom) Colin McRae
Leg 2 (20 Jan)	SS7	BIF. D1/C1 — Turriers	24.12 km	(Finland) Tommi Mäkinen	Mitsubishi Lancer Evo 6.5	17:31.1	(United Kingdom) Colin McRae
Leg 2 (20 Jan)	SS8	Sisteron — Thoard 1	36.69 km	(Finland) Tommi Mäkinen	Mitsubishi Lancer Evo 6.5	26:02.3	(United Kingdom) Colin McRae
Leg 2 (20 Jan)	SS9	Clumanc — Lambruisse 2	14.75 km	(France) François Delecour	Ford Focus RS WRC '01	10:25.1	(Finland) Tommi Mäkinen
Leg 2 (20 Jan)	SS10	Comps — Castellane 2	20.53 km	Stage cancelled			(Finland) Tommi Mäkinen
Leg 2 (20 Jan)	SS11	Sisteron — Thoard 2	36.69 km	(United Kingdom) Colin McRae	Ford Focus RS WRC '01	26:22.1	(United Kingdom) Colin McRae
Leg 3 (21 Jan)	SS12	Sospel — La Bollène 1	32.72 km	(Belgium) Freddy Loix	Mitsubishi Carisma GT Evo VI	28:19.0	(Finland) Tommi Mäkinen
Leg 3 (21 Jan)	SS13	Loda — Lucéram 1	16.55 km	(Finland) Tommi Mäkinen	Mitsubishi Lancer Evo 6.5	14:57.6	(Finland) Tommi Mäkinen
Leg 3 (21 Jan)	SS14	Sospel — La Bollène 2	32.72 km	(France) François Delecour	Ford Focus RS WRC '01	26:24.6	(Finland) Tommi Mäkinen
Leg 3 (21 Jan)	SS15	Loda — Lucéram 2	16.55 km	(Spain) Carlos Sainz	Ford Focus RS WRC '01	14:09.5	(Finland) Tommi Mäkinen

==== Championship standings ====
Pos.	Drivers' championships			Co-drivers' championships			Manufacturers' championships		
Pos.	Move	Driver	Points	Move	Co-driver	Points	Move	Manufacturer	Points
1	New entry	(Finland) Tommi Mäkinen	10	New entry	(Finland) Risto Mannisenmäki	10	New entry	(Japan) Marlboro Mitsubishi Ralliart	13
2	New entry	(Spain) Carlos Sainz	6	New entry	(Spain) Luis Moya	6	New entry	(United Kingdom) Ford Motor Co. Ltd.	6
3	New entry	(France) François Delecour	4	New entry	(France) Daniel Grataloup	4	New entry	(Czech Republic) Škoda Motorsport	5
4	New entry	(Germany) Armin Schwarz	3	New entry	(Germany) Manfred Hiemer	3	New entry	(South Korea) Hyundai Castrol World Rally Team	2
5	New entry	(Finland) Toni Gardemeister	2	New entry	(Finland) Paavo Lukander	2			

=== FIA Cup for Production Rally Drivers ===
==== Classification ====
Position		No.	Driver	Co-driver	Entrant	Car	Time	Difference	Points
Event	Class	No.	Driver	Co-driver	Entrant	Car	Time	Difference	Points
9	1	44	(Switzerland) Olivier Gillet	(Monaco) Freddy Delorme	(Switzerland) Olivier Gillet	Mitsubishi Lancer Evo VI	4:54:28.2		10
10	2	23	(Austria) Manfred Stohl	(Austria) Peter Müller	(Austria) Manfred Stohl	Mitsubishi Lancer Evo VI	4:55:54.6	+1:26.4	6
11	3	24	(Uruguay) Gustavo Trelles	(Argentina) Jorge Del Buono	(Uruguay) Gustavo Trelles	Mitsubishi Lancer Evo VI	4:56:41.5	+2:13.3	4
12	4	26	(Argentina) Gabriel Pozzo	(Argentina) Edgardo Galindo	(Argentina) Gabriel Pozzo	Mitsubishi Lancer Evo VI	4:57:14.9	+2:46.7	3
13	5	54	(Argentina) Marcos Ligato	(Argentina) Rubén García	(Argentina) Marcos Ligato	Mitsubishi Lancer Evo VI	5:01:41.2	+7:13.0	2
16	6	53	(France) David Truphemus	(France) Pascal Saivre	(France) David Truphemus	Mitsubishi Lancer Evo VI	5:11:23.7	+16:55.5	1
17	7	61	(France) Eddie Mercier	(France) Jean-Michel Veret	(France) Eddie Mercier	Renault Clio RS	5:11:45.4	+17:17.2	0
19	8	57	(France) Christophe Arnaud	(France) Stéphane Arnaud	(France) Christophe Arnaud	Renault Clio RS	5:19:35.8	+25:07.6	0
21	9	49	(Belgium) Bob Colsoul	(Belgium) Tom Colsoul	(Belgium) Bob Colsoul	Mitsubishi Lancer Evo V	5:37:55.2	+43:27.0	0
23	10	59	(France) Frédéric Maniccia	(France) Richard Thaon	(France) Frédéric Maniccia	Renault Clio RS	5:44:15.2	+49:47.0	0
26	11	64	(Monaco) Marc Dessi	(Monaco) Pamela Dessi	(Monaco) Marc Dessi	Peugeot 205 GTI 1.9	6:07:48.1	+1:13:19.9	0
Retired SS12		25	(Italy) Gianluigi Galli	(Italy) Giovanni Bernacchini	(Italy) Gianluigi Galli	Mitsubishi Lancer Evo VI	Mechanical		0
Retired SS11		46	(Germany) Hermann Gassner Sr.	(Germany) Siegfried Schrankl	(Germany) Hermann Gassner Sr.	Proton Pert Evo V	Mechanical		0
Retired SS11		50	(France) Patrice Rouit	(France) Dominique Lamy	(France) Patrice Rouit	Mitsubishi Lancer Evo III	Mechanical		0
Retired SS4		48	(Italy) Marco Menegatto	(France) Christophe Berard	(Italy) Marco Menegatto	Mitsubishi Lancer Evo VI	Mechanical		0
Retired SS4		58	(France) Nicolas Vouilloz	(France) Steeve Rebroin	(France) Nicolas Vouilloz	Renault Clio Williams	Mechanical		0
Retired SS4		60	(Germany) Jürgen Barth	(France) Jean-Claude Perramond	(Germany) Jürgen Barth	Opel Astra OPC	Mechanical		0
Retired SS3		47	(Italy) Luca Baldini	(Italy) Massimiliano Cerrai	(Italy) Luca Baldini	Mitsubishi Lancer Evo VI	Accident		0
Retired SS3		63	(Italy) Gabriele Cadringher	(Italy) Gianfranco Serembre	(Italy) Gabriele Cadringher	Opel Astra OPC	Mechanical		0
Retired SS2		45	(Italy) Giovanni Manfrinato	(Italy) Claudio Condotta	(Italy) Giovanni Manfrinato	Mitsubishi Lancer Evo VI	Mechanical		0
Retired SS1		52	(Italy) Norberto Cangani	(Italy) Eros Di Prima	(Italy) Norberto Cangani	Mitsubishi Lancer Evo VI	Mechanical		0
Retired SS1		62	(France) Nicolas Ressegaire	(France) Régis Ressegaire	(France) Nicolas Ressegaire	Renault Clio RS	Accident		0
Retired SS1		65	(France) Jacques Courmontagne	(France) Josette Martin	(France) Jacques Courmontagne	Peugeot 106 XSI	Accident		0

==== Special stages ====
Day	Stage	Stage name	Length	Winner	Car	Time	Class leaders
Leg 1 (19 Jan)	SS1	BIF. D5/D10 — Roquesteron 1	22.89 km	(Switzerland) Olivier Gillet	Mitsubishi Lancer Evo VI	21:08.0	(Switzerland) Olivier Gillet
Leg 1 (19 Jan)	SS2	St. Pierre — Entrevaux 1	30.34 km	(Germany) Hermann Gassner Sr.	Proton Pert Evo V	25:38.5	(Germany) Hermann Gassner Sr.
Leg 1 (19 Jan)	SS3	BIF. D5/D10 — Roquesteron 2	22.89 km	(Argentina) Marcos Ligato	Mitsubishi Lancer Evo VI	19:20.8	(Germany) Hermann Gassner Sr.
Leg 1 (19 Jan)	SS4	St. Pierre — Entrevaux 2	30.34 km	(Austria) Manfred Stohl	Mitsubishi Lancer Evo VI	23:22.6	(Germany) Hermann Gassner Sr.
Leg 1 (19 Jan)	SS5	Comps — Castellane 1	20.53 km	(Austria) Manfred Stohl	Mitsubishi Lancer Evo VI	14:23.3	(Austria) Manfred Stohl
Leg 1 (19 Jan)	SS6	Clumanc — Lambruisse 1	14.75 km	(Italy) Gianluigi Galli	Mitsubishi Lancer Evo VI	11:13.8	(Austria) Manfred Stohl
Leg 2 (20 Jan)	SS7	BIF. D1/C1 — Turriers	24.12 km	(Italy) Gianluigi Galli	Mitsubishi Lancer Evo VI	18:13.7	(Austria) Manfred Stohl
Leg 2 (20 Jan)	SS8	Sisteron — Thoard 1	36.69 km	(Italy) Gianluigi Galli	Mitsubishi Lancer Evo VI	27:08.1	(Switzerland) Olivier Gillet
Leg 2 (20 Jan)	SS9	Clumanc — Lambruisse 2	14.75 km	(Austria) Manfred Stohl	Mitsubishi Lancer Evo VI	10:54.7	(Switzerland) Olivier Gillet
Leg 2 (20 Jan)	SS10	Comps — Castellane 2	20.53 km	Stage cancelled			(Switzerland) Olivier Gillet
Leg 2 (20 Jan)	SS11	Sisteron — Thoard 2	36.69 km	(Austria) Manfred Stohl	Mitsubishi Lancer Evo VI	27:50.9	(Switzerland) Olivier Gillet
Leg 3 (21 Jan)	SS12	Sospel — La Bollène 1	32.72 km	(Switzerland) Olivier Gillet	Mitsubishi Lancer Evo VI	29:18.0	(Switzerland) Olivier Gillet
Leg 3 (21 Jan)	SS13	Loda — Lucéram 1	16.55 km	(Uruguay) Gustavo Trelles	Mitsubishi Lancer Evo VI	15:30.8	(Switzerland) Olivier Gillet
Leg 3 (21 Jan)	SS14	Sospel — La Bollène 2	32.72 km	(Austria) Manfred Stohl	Mitsubishi Lancer Evo VI	27:43.0	(Switzerland) Olivier Gillet
Leg 3 (21 Jan)	SS15	Loda — Lucéram 2	16.55 km	(Uruguay) Gustavo Trelles	Mitsubishi Lancer Evo VI	14:45.0	(Switzerland) Olivier Gillet

==== Championship standings ====
Pos.	Drivers' championships		
Pos.	Move	Driver	Points
1	New entry	(Switzerland) Olivier Gillet	10
2	New entry	(Austria) Manfred Stohl	6
3	New entry	(Uruguay) Gustavo Trelles	4
4	New entry	(Argentina) Gabriel Pozzo	3
5	New entry	(Argentina) Marcos Ligato	2
