= 2001 Rally Argentina =

5th round of the 2001 World Rally Championship

2001 Rally Argentina 21st Rally Argentina
Round 5 of the 2001 World Rally Championship season
| ← Previous event | Next event → |
- Host country: Argentina
- Rally base: Villa Carlos Paz
- Dates run: May 3, 2001 – May 6, 2001
- Stages: 21 (389.58 km; 242.07 miles)
- Stage surface: Gravel
- Overall distance: 1,337.42 km (831.03 miles)

Statistics
- Crews: 65 at start, 32 at finish

Overall results
- Overall winner: (United Kingdom) Colin McRae (United Kingdom) Nicky Grist (United Kingdom) Ford Motor Co. Ltd. Ford Focus RS WRC '01

The 2001 Rally Argentina (formally the 21st Rally Argentina) was the fifth round of the 2001 World Rally Championship. The race was held over four days between 3 May and 6 May 2001, and was won by Ford's Colin McRae, his 21st win in the World Rally Championship.

== Background ==
=== Entry list ===
| No. | Driver | Co-Driver | Entrant | Car | Tyre |
|---|---|---|---|---|---|
World Rally Championship manufacturer entries
| 1 | (Finland) Marcus Grönholm | (Finland) Timo Rautiainen | (France) Peugeot Total | Peugeot 206 WRC | M |
| 2 | (France) Didier Auriol | (France) Denis Giraudet | (France) Peugeot Total | Peugeot 206 WRC | M |
| 3 | (Spain) Carlos Sainz | (Spain) Luis Moya | (United Kingdom) Ford Motor Co. Ltd. | Ford Focus RS WRC '01 | P |
| 4 | (United Kingdom) Colin McRae | (United Kingdom) Nicky Grist | (United Kingdom) Ford Motor Co. Ltd. | Ford Focus RS WRC '01 | P |
| 5 | (United Kingdom) Richard Burns | (United Kingdom) Robert Reid | (Japan) Subaru World Rally Team | Subaru Impreza S7 WRC '01 | P |
| 6 | (Norway) Petter Solberg | (United Kingdom) Phil Mills | (Japan) Subaru World Rally Team | Subaru Impreza S7 WRC '01 | P |
| 7 | (Finland) Tommi Mäkinen | (Finland) Risto Mannisenmäki | (Japan) Marlboro Mitsubishi Ralliart | Mitsubishi Lancer Evo 6.5 | M |
| 8 | (Belgium) Freddy Loix | (Belgium) Sven Smeets | (Japan) Marlboro Mitsubishi Ralliart | Mitsubishi Carisma GT Evo VI | M |
| 9 | (Sweden) Kenneth Eriksson | (Sweden) Staffan Parmander | (South Korea) Hyundai Castrol World Rally Team | Hyundai Accent WRC2 | M |
| 10 | (United Kingdom) Alister McRae | (United Kingdom) David Senior | (South Korea) Hyundai Castrol World Rally Team | Hyundai Accent WRC2 | M |
| 11 | (Germany) Armin Schwarz | (Germany) Manfred Hiemer | (Czech Republic) Škoda Motorsport | Škoda Octavia WRC Evo2 | M |
| 12 | (Belgium) Bruno Thiry | (Belgium) Stéphane Prévot | (Czech Republic) Škoda Motorsport | Škoda Octavia WRC Evo2 | M |
World Rally Championship entries
| 16 | (Finland) Harri Rovanperä | (Finland) Risto Pietiläinen | (France) Peugeot Total | Peugeot 206 WRC | M |
| 17 | (France) François Delecour | (France) Daniel Grataloup | (United Kingdom) Ford Motor Co. Ltd. | Ford Focus RS WRC '01 | P |
| 18 | (Japan) Toshihiro Arai | (Australia) Glenn Macneall | (Japan) Subaru World Rally Team | Subaru Impreza S7 WRC '01 | P |
| 19 | (Spain) Marc Blázquez | (Spain) Jordi Mercader | (Spain) Seat Sport | Seat Cordoba WRC Evo3 | P |
| 52 | (Argentina) Martin Galluser | (Argentina) Juan Carlos Uberti | (Argentina) Martin Galluser | Mitsubishi Lancer Evo III | —N/a |
Group N Cup entries
| 20 | (Uruguay) Gustavo Trelles | (Argentina) Jorge Del Buono | (Uruguay) Gustavo Trelles | Mitsubishi Lancer Evo VI | P |
| 21 | (Argentina) Gabriel Pozzo | (Argentina) Daniel Stillo | (Italy) Top Run SRL | Mitsubishi Lancer Evo VI | P |
| 22 | (Argentina) Marcos Ligato | (Argentina) Rubén García | (Italy) Top Run SRL | Mitsubishi Lancer Evo VI | P |
| 23 | (Sweden) Stig Blomqvist | (Venezuela) Ana Goñi | (United Kingdom) David Sutton Cars Ltd | Mitsubishi Lancer Evo VI | —N/a |
| 24 | (Argentina) Roberto Sanchez | (Argentina) Edgardo Galindo | (Argentina) Roberto Sanchez | Subaru Impreza WRX | P |
| 25 | (Argentina) Claudio Marcelo Menzi | (Argentina) Santiago Garcia | (Argentina) Claudio Marcelo Menzi | Subaru Impreza WRX | —N/a |
| 26 | (Argentina) Sebastián Beltran | (Argentina) Ricardo Kember | (Argentina) Sebastián Beltran | Subaru Impreza WRX | —N/a |
| 27 | (Argentina) Esteban Goldenhersch | (Argentina) Fabian Cretu | (Argentina) Esteban Goldenhersch | Subaru Impreza WRX | —N/a |
| 28 | (Argentina) Federico Villagra | (Argentina) Javier Villagra | (Argentina) Federico Villagra | Mitsubishi Lancer Evo VI | —N/a |
| 29 | (Argentina) Marcelo Bugliotti | (Argentina) Guillermo Piazzano | (Argentina) Marcelo Bugliotti | Mitsubishi Lancer Evo VI | —N/a |
| 30 | (Argentina) Pablo Davila | (Argentina) Rodolfo Amelio Ortiz | (Argentina) Pablo Davila | Mitsubishi Lancer Evo VI | —N/a |
| 31 | (Italy) Gabriele Cadringher | (Italy) Gianfranco Serembre | (Italy) Top Run SRL | Mitsubishi Lancer Evo VI | —N/a |
| 33 | (Mexico) Gabriel Marin Sr. | (Mexico) Javier Marín | (Mexico) Gabriel Marin Sr. | Subaru Impreza 555 | —N/a |
| 35 | (Argentina) Juan Pablo Raies | (Argentina) Jorge Perez Companc | (Argentina) Juan Pablo Raies | Mitsubishi Lancer Evo VI | —N/a |
| 36 | (Argentina) Ricardo Bissio | (Argentina) Claudio Henin | (Argentina) Ricardo Bissio | Mitsubishi Lancer Evo V | —N/a |
| 37 | (Argentina) Facundo Chali | (Argentina) Gabriel Carranza | (Argentina) Facundo Chali | Subaru Impreza 555 | —N/a |
| 38 | (Argentina) Daniel Marrochi | (Argentina) Nestor Juarez | (Argentina) Daniel Marrochi | Mitsubishi Lancer Evo VI | —N/a |
| 39 | (Argentina) Luis Perez Companc | (Argentina) Jose Maria Volta | (Argentina) Luis Perez Companc | Mitsubishi Lancer Evo VI | —N/a |
| 40 | (Italy) Luca Baldini | (Italy) Marco Muzzarelli | (Italy) Top Run SRL | Mitsubishi Lancer Evo VI | —N/a |
| 42 | (Argentina) Alberto De Simone | (Argentina) Gustavo Topalian | (Argentina) Alberto De Simone | Subaru Impreza 555 | —N/a |
| 43 | (Argentina) Ariel Larrauri | (Argentina) Pablo Curtoni | (Argentina) Ariel Larrauri | Mitsubishi Lancer Evo VI | —N/a |
| 44 | (Argentina) Pablo Maranzana | (Argentina) Cesar Lepori | (Argentina) Pablo Maranzana | Mitsubishi Lancer Evo V | —N/a |
| 45 | (Chile) Ronald Kupfer Puyol | (Chile) Carlos Pena Wishniewsky | (Chile) Ronald Kupfer Puyol | Subaru Impreza 555 | —N/a |
| 46 | (Argentina) Fernando Cruz | (Argentina) Carlos Cruz | (Argentina) Fernando Cruz | Subaru Impreza 555 | —N/a |
| 48 | (Argentina) Heriberto Ortiz | (Argentina) Angel Oscar Alaejos | (Argentina) Heriberto Ortiz | Mitsubishi Lancer Evo VI | —N/a |
| 49 | (Argentina) Alfredo Cravero | (Argentina) Cristian D'Alessandro | (Argentina) Alfredo Cravero | Subaru Impreza WRX | —N/a |
| 50 | (Argentina) Eduardo Copello | (Argentina) Carlos Galander | (Argentina) Eduardo Copello | Subaru Impreza 555 | —N/a |
| 51 | (Argentina) Carlos Odon | (Argentina) Sergio Perugini | (Argentina) Carlos Odon | Mitsubishi Lancer Evo VI | —N/a |
| 53 | (Chile) Daniel Mass | (Chile) Macarena Pizarro | (Chile) Daniel Mass | Subaru Impreza 555 | —N/a |
| 54 | (Argentina) Arturo Abella Nazar | (Argentina) Camila Abella | (Argentina) Arturo Abella Nazar | Mitsubishi Lancer Evo VI | —N/a |
| 55 | (Argentina) Julio Sampayo | (Argentina) Ezequiel Queralt | (Argentina) Julio Sampayo | Mitsubishi Lancer Evo V | —N/a |
| 56 | (Argentina) Gerardo Felipe | (Argentina) Gustavo Beccaria | (Argentina) Gerardo Felipe | Seat Ibiza GTi 16V | —N/a |
| 57 | (Argentina) Diego Dominguez | (Argentina) Matias Aranguren | (Argentina) Diego Dominguez | Seat Ibiza GTi 16V | —N/a |
| 59 | (Argentina) Hernan Kim | (Argentina) Luciano Gennoni | (Argentina) Hernan Kim | Seat Ibiza GTi 16V | —N/a |
| 64 | (Argentina) Roberto Castelli | (Argentina) Julio Fossat | (Argentina) Roberto Castelli | Seat Ibiza GTi 16V | —N/a |
| 65 | (Argentina) Jose Lacoppola | (Argentina) Jorge García Quiroga | (Argentina) Jose Lacoppola | Seat Ibiza GTi 16V | —N/a |
| 66 | (Argentina) Jorge Marchetto | (Argentina) Julián Abramián | (Argentina) Jorge Marchetto | Peugeot 306 Rallye | —N/a |
| 67 | (Argentina) Carlos Cuevas | (Argentina) Alberto Cuevas | (Argentina) Carlos Cuevas | Seat Ibiza GTi 16V | —N/a |
| 70 | (Argentina) Benjamin Alvarez | (Argentina) Luis Oyola | (Argentina) Benjamin Alvarez | Seat Ibiza GTi 16V | —N/a |
| 72 | (Chile) Eduardo Cavalieri | (Chile) Eduardo Astorga Aguirre | (Chile) Eduardo Cavalieri | Daewoo Lanos | —N/a |
| 73 | (Chile) Gustavo González | (Chile) Aldo Zambra | (Chile) Gustavo González | Suzuki Swift GTi | —N/a |
| 74 | (Argentina) Orlando Silvi | (Argentina) Marcelo Alvarez | (Argentina) Orlando Silvi | Suzuki Swift GTi | —N/a |
| 75 | (Argentina) Guillermo Bottazzini | (Argentina) Matias Martinez | (Argentina) Guillermo Bottazzini | Suzuki Swift GTi | —N/a |

=== Itinerary ===
All dates and times are ART (UTC−3).

| Date | Time | No. | Stage name | Distance |
|---|---|---|---|---|
Leg 1 — 150.59 km
| 3 May | 19:15 | SS1 | Complejo Pro Racing (Lane A) | 3.44 km |
| 3 May | 19:20 | SS2 | Complejo Pro Racing (Lane B) | 3.44 km |
| 4 May | 09:22 | SS3 | La Falda — Rio Ceballos | 29.96 km |
| 4 May | 10:40 | SS4 | Ascochinga — La Cumbre 1 | 28.83 km |
| 4 May | 12:08 | SS5 | Capilla del Monte — San Marcos Sierra | 23.02 km |
| 4 May | 12:39 | SS6 | San Marcos Sierra — Charbonier | 9.61 km |
| 4 May | 14:15 | SS7 | La Cumbre — Agua de Oro | 23.46 km |
| 4 May | 15:08 | SS8 | Ascochinga — La Cumbre 2 | 28.83 km |
Leg 2 — 120.43 km
| 5 May | 09:13 | SS9 | Santa Rosa de Calamuchita — San Agustin 1 | 26.10 km |
| 5 May | 09:59 | SS10 | San Agustin — Villa General Belgrano | 12.65 km |
| 5 May | 10:57 | SS11 | Amboy — Santa Rosa de Calamuchita 1 | 17.48 km |
| 5 May | 12:16 | SS12 | Santa Rosa de Calamuchita — San Agustin 2 | 26.10 km |
| 5 May | 12:59 | SS13 | Las Bajadas — Villa del Dique | 16.42 km |
| 5 May | 13:42 | SS14 | Amboy — Santa Rosa de Calamuchita 2 | 17.48 km |
| 5 May | 16:18 | SS15 | Camping General San Martin | 4.20 km |
Leg 3 — 118.56 km
| 6 May | 09:06 | SS16 | Cura Brochero — Cienaga de Allende | 13.63 km |
| 6 May | 09:47 | SS17 | El Mirador — San Lorenzo 1 | 20.65 km |
| 6 May | 11:21 | SS18 | Chamico — Ambul | 24.60 km |
| 6 May | 12:05 | SS19 | El Mirador — San Lorenzo 2 | 20.65 km |
| 6 May | 13:48 | SS20 | Mina Clavero — Giulio Cesare | 22.26 km |
| 6 May | 14:35 | SS21 | El Condor — Copina | 16.77 km |

== Results ==
=== Overall ===
| Pos. | No. | Driver | Co-driver | Team | Car | Time | Difference | Points |
|---|---|---|---|---|---|---|---|---|
| 1 | 4 | (United Kingdom) Colin McRae | (United Kingdom) Nicky Grist | (United Kingdom) Ford Motor Co. Ltd. | Ford Focus RS WRC '01 | 4:18:25.3 | | 10 |
| 2 | 5 | (United Kingdom) Richard Burns | (United Kingdom) Robert Reid | (Japan) Subaru World Rally Team | Subaru Impreza S7 WRC '01 | 4:18:52.2 | +26.9 | 6 |
| 3 | 3 | (Spain) Carlos Sainz | (Spain) Luis Moya | (United Kingdom) Ford Motor Co. Ltd. | Ford Focus RS WRC '01 | 4:20:11.7 | +1:46.4 | 4 |
| 4 | 7 | (Finland) Tommi Mäkinen | (Finland) Risto Mannisenmäki | (Japan) Marlboro Mitsubishi Ralliart | Mitsubishi Lancer Evo 6.5 | 4:21:37.9 | +3:12.6 | 3 |
| 5 | 6 | (Norway) Petter Solberg | (United Kingdom) Phil Mills | (Japan) Subaru World Rally Team | Subaru Impreza S7 WRC '01 | 4:22:12.3 | +3:47.0 | 2 |
| 6 | 8 | (Belgium) Freddy Loix | (Belgium) Sven Smeets | (Japan) Marlboro Mitsubishi Ralliart | Mitsubishi Carisma GT Evo VI | 4:24:05.4 | +5:40.1 | 1 |

=== World Rally Cars ===
==== Classification ====
| Position | | No. | Driver | Co-driver | Entrant | Car | Time | Difference | Points |
| Event | Class | No. | Driver | Co-driver | Entrant | Car | Time | Difference | Points |
|---|---|---|---|---|---|---|---|---|---|
| 1 | 1 | 4 | (United Kingdom) Colin McRae | (United Kingdom) Nicky Grist | (United Kingdom) Ford Motor Co. Ltd. | Ford Focus RS WRC '01 | 4:18:25.3 | | 10 |
| 2 | 2 | 5 | (United Kingdom) Richard Burns | (United Kingdom) Robert Reid | (Japan) Subaru World Rally Team | Subaru Impreza S7 WRC '01 | 4:18:52.2 | +26.9 | 6 |
| 3 | 3 | 3 | (Spain) Carlos Sainz | (Spain) Luis Moya | (United Kingdom) Ford Motor Co. Ltd. | Ford Focus RS WRC '01 | 4:20:11.7 | +1:46.4 | 4 |
| 4 | 4 | 7 | (Finland) Tommi Mäkinen | (Finland) Risto Mannisenmäki | (Japan) Marlboro Mitsubishi Ralliart | Mitsubishi Lancer Evo 6.5 | 4:21:37.9 | +3:12.6 | 3 |
| 5 | 5 | 6 | (Norway) Petter Solberg | (United Kingdom) Phil Mills | (Japan) Subaru World Rally Team | Subaru Impreza S7 WRC '01 | 4:22:12.3 | +3:47.0 | 2 |
| 6 | 6 | 8 | (Belgium) Freddy Loix | (Belgium) Sven Smeets | (Japan) Marlboro Mitsubishi Ralliart | Mitsubishi Carisma GT Evo VI | 4:24:05.4 | +5:40.1 | 1 |
| 9 | 7 | 10 | (United Kingdom) Alister McRae | (United Kingdom) David Senior | (South Korea) Hyundai Castrol World Rally Team | Hyundai Accent WRC2 | 4:32:24.2 | +13:58.9 | 0 |
| Retired SS20 | | 2 | (France) Didier Auriol | (France) Denis Giraudet | (France) Peugeot Total | Peugeot 206 WRC | Suspension | | 0 |
| Retired SS20 | | 9 | (Sweden) Kenneth Eriksson | (Sweden) Staffan Parmander | (South Korea) Hyundai Castrol World Rally Team | Hyundai Accent WRC2 | Lost wheel | | 0 |
| Retired SS18 | | 1 | (Finland) Marcus Grönholm | (Finland) Timo Rautiainen | (France) Peugeot Total | Peugeot 206 WRC | Clutch | | 0 |
| Retired SS11 | | 11 | (Germany) Armin Schwarz | (Germany) Manfred Hiemer | (Czech Republic) Škoda Motorsport | Škoda Octavia WRC Evo2 | Accident on road section | | 0 |
| Retired SS11 | | 12 | (Belgium) Bruno Thiry | (Belgium) Stéphane Prévot | (Czech Republic) Škoda Motorsport | Škoda Octavia WRC Evo2 | Accident on road section | | 0 |

==== Special stages ====
| Day | Stage | Stage name | Length | Winner | Car | Time | Class leaders |
|---|---|---|---|---|---|---|---|
| Leg 1 (3 May) | SS1 | Complejo Pro Racing (Lane A) | 3.44 km | (United Kingdom) Colin McRae | Ford Focus RS WRC '01 | 2:27.9 | (United Kingdom) Colin McRae |
| Leg 1 (3 May) | SS2 | Complejo Pro Racing (Lane B) | 3.44 km | (United Kingdom) Colin McRae | Ford Focus RS WRC '01 | 2:25.1 | (United Kingdom) Colin McRae |
| Leg 1 (4 May) | SS3 | La Falda — Rio Ceballos | 29.96 km | (United Kingdom) Colin McRae | Ford Focus RS WRC '01 | 22:34.1 | (United Kingdom) Colin McRae |
| Leg 1 (4 May) | SS4 | Ascochinga — La Cumbre 1 | 28.83 km | (United Kingdom) Colin McRae | Ford Focus RS WRC '01 | 18:39.9 | (United Kingdom) Colin McRae |
| Leg 1 (4 May) | SS5 | Capilla del Monte — San Marcos Sierra | 23.02 km | (United Kingdom) Colin McRae | Ford Focus RS WRC '01 | 17:09.1 | (United Kingdom) Colin McRae |
| Leg 1 (4 May) | SS6 | San Marcos Sierra — Charbonier | 9.61 km | (United Kingdom) Richard Burns | Subaru Impreza S7 WRC '01 | 6:33.6 | (United Kingdom) Colin McRae |
| Leg 1 (4 May) | SS7 | La Cumbre — Agua de Oro | 23.46 km | (Spain) Carlos Sainz | Ford Focus RS WRC '01 | 19:45.8 | (United Kingdom) Colin McRae |
| Leg 1 (4 May) | SS8 | Ascochinga — La Cumbre 2 | 28.83 km | (United Kingdom) Colin McRae | Ford Focus RS WRC '01 | 18:24.2 | (United Kingdom) Colin McRae |
| Leg 2 (5 May) | SS9 | Santa Rosa de Calamuchita — San Agustin 1 | 26.10 km | (United Kingdom) Richard Burns | Subaru Impreza S7 WRC '01 | 15:22.6 | (United Kingdom) Colin McRae |
| Leg 2 (5 May) | SS10 | San Agustin — Villa General Belgrano | 12.65 km | (United Kingdom) Colin McRae | Ford Focus RS WRC '01 | 9:19.2 | (United Kingdom) Colin McRae |
| Leg 2 (5 May) | SS11 | Amboy — Santa Rosa de Calamuchita 1 | 17.48 km | (United Kingdom) Richard Burns | Subaru Impreza S7 WRC '01 | 9:13.6 | (United Kingdom) Colin McRae |
| Leg 2 (5 May) | SS12 | Santa Rosa de Calamuchita — San Agustin 2 | 26.10 km | (United Kingdom) Colin McRae | Ford Focus RS WRC '01 | 15:10.4 | (United Kingdom) Colin McRae |
| Leg 2 (5 May) | SS13 | Las Bajadas — Villa del Dique | 16.42 km | (United Kingdom) Richard Burns | Subaru Impreza S7 WRC '01 | 8:48.3 | (United Kingdom) Colin McRae |
| Leg 2 (5 May) | SS14 | Amboy — Santa Rosa de Calamuchita 2 | 17.48 km | (United Kingdom) Richard Burns | Subaru Impreza S7 WRC '01 | 9:09.2 | (United Kingdom) Colin McRae |
| Leg 2 (5 May) | SS15 | Camping General San Martin | 4.20 km | (Finland) Tommi Mäkinen | Mitsubishi Lancer Evo 6.5 | 3:04.1 | (United Kingdom) Colin McRae |
| Leg 3 (6 May) | SS16 | Cura Brochero — Cienaga de Allende | 13.63 km | (Finland) Tommi Mäkinen | Mitsubishi Lancer Evo 6.5 | 6:43.1 | (United Kingdom) Colin McRae |
| Leg 3 (6 May) | SS17 | El Mirador — San Lorenzo 1 | 20.65 km | (Finland) Marcus Grönholm | Peugeot 206 WRC | 11:29.5 | (United Kingdom) Colin McRae |
| Leg 3 (6 May) | SS18 | Chamico — Ambul | 24.60 km | (United Kingdom) Richard Burns | Subaru Impreza S7 WRC '01 | 17:50.4 | (United Kingdom) Colin McRae |
| Leg 3 (6 May) | SS19 | El Mirador — San Lorenzo 2 | 20.65 km | (United Kingdom) Richard Burns | Subaru Impreza S7 WRC '01 | 11:25.3 | (United Kingdom) Colin McRae |
| Leg 3 (6 May) | SS20 | Mina Clavero — Giulio Cesare | 22.26 km | (United Kingdom) Colin McRae | Ford Focus RS WRC '01 | 18:06.4 | (United Kingdom) Colin McRae |
| Leg 3 (6 May) | SS21 | El Condor — Copina | 16.77 km | (United Kingdom) Colin McRae | Ford Focus RS WRC '01 | 13:50.3 | (United Kingdom) Colin McRae |

==== Championship standings ====
| Pos. | Drivers' championships | | | Co-drivers' championships | | | Manufacturers' championships | | |
| Pos. | Move | Driver | Points | Move | Co-driver | Points | Move | Manufacturer | Points |
|---|---|---|---|---|---|---|---|---|---|
| 1 | | (Finland) Tommi Mäkinen | 27 | | (Finland) Risto Mannisenmäki | 27 | | (Japan) Marlboro Mitsubishi Ralliart | 44 |
| 2 | | (Spain) Carlos Sainz | 22 | | (Spain) Luis Moya | 22 | | (United Kingdom) Ford Motor Co. Ltd. | 36 |
| 3 | | (France) Didier Auriol | 10 | | (France) Denis Giraudet | 10 | | (France) Peugeot Total | 20 |
| 4 | New entry | (United Kingdom) Colin McRae | 10 | New entry | (United Kingdom) Nicky Grist | 10 | | (Japan) Subaru World Rally Team | 16 |
| 5 | 1 | (Finland) Harri Rovanperä | 10 | 1 | (Finland) Risto Pietiläinen | 10 | | (South Korea) Hyundai Castrol World Rally Team | 8 |

=== FIA Cup for Production Rally Drivers ===
==== Classification ====
| Position | | No. | Driver | Co-driver | Entrant | Car | Time | Difference | Points |
| Event | Class | No. | Driver | Co-driver | Entrant | Car | Time | Difference | Points |
|---|---|---|---|---|---|---|---|---|---|
| 10 | 1 | 21 | (Argentina) Gabriel Pozzo | (Argentina) Daniel Stillo | (Italy) Top Run SRL | Mitsubishi Lancer Evo VI | 4:38:40.4 | | 10 |
| 11 | 2 | 20 | (Uruguay) Gustavo Trelles | (Argentina) Jorge Del Buono | (Uruguay) Gustavo Trelles | Mitsubishi Lancer Evo VI | 4:40:45.5 | +2:05.1 | 6 |
| 12 | 3 | 24 | (Argentina) Roberto Sanchez | (Argentina) Edgardo Galindo | (Argentina) Roberto Sanchez | Subaru Impreza WRX | 4:44:34.5 | +5:54.1 | 4 |
| 13 | 4 | 39 | (Argentina) Luis Perez Companc | (Argentina) Jose Maria Volta | (Argentina) Luis Perez Companc | Mitsubishi Lancer Evo VI | 4:49:49.6 | +11:09.2 | 3 |
| 14 | 5 | 27 | (Argentina) Esteban Goldenhersch | (Argentina) Fabian Cretu | (Argentina) Esteban Goldenhersch | Subaru Impreza WRX | 4:49:56.4 | +11:16.0 | 2 |
| 15 | 6 | 28 | (Argentina) Federico Villagra | (Argentina) Javier Villagra | (Argentina) Federico Villagra | Mitsubishi Lancer Evo VI | 4:51:52.2 | +13:11.8 | 1 |
| 16 | 7 | 40 | (Italy) Luca Baldini | (Italy) Marco Muzzarelli | (Italy) Top Run SRL | Mitsubishi Lancer Evo VI | 4:59:19.2 | +20:38.8 | 0 |
| 17 | 8 | 50 | (Argentina) Eduardo Copello | (Argentina) Carlos Galander | (Argentina) Eduardo Copello | Subaru Impreza 555 | 5:11:46.0 | +33:05.6 | 0 |
| 18 | 9 | 44 | (Argentina) Pablo Maranzana | (Argentina) Cesar Lepori | (Argentina) Pablo Maranzana | Mitsubishi Lancer Evo V | 5:14:01.5 | +35:21.1 | 0 |
| 19 | 10 | 35 | (Argentina) Juan Pablo Raies | (Argentina) Jorge Perez Companc | (Argentina) Juan Pablo Raies | Mitsubishi Lancer Evo VI | 5:18:25.5 | +39:45.1 | 0 |
| 20 | 11 | 46 | (Argentina) Fernando Cruz | (Argentina) Carlos Cruz | (Argentina) Fernando Cruz | Subaru Impreza 555 | 5:24:32.6 | +45:52.2 | 0 |
| 21 | 12 | 42 | (Argentina) Alberto De Simone | (Argentina) Gustavo Topalian | (Argentina) Alberto De Simone | Subaru Impreza 555 | 5:29:49.0 | +51:08.6 | 0 |
| 22 | 13 | 33 | (Mexico) Gabriel Marin Sr. | (Mexico) Javier Marín | (Mexico) Gabriel Marin Sr. | Subaru Impreza 555 | 5:31:53.7 | +53:13.3 | 0 |
| 23 | 14 | 51 | (Argentina) Carlos Odon | (Argentina) Sergio Perugini | (Argentina) Carlos Odon | Mitsubishi Lancer Evo VI | 5:33:07.5 | +54:27.1 | 0 |
| 25 | 15 | 54 | (Argentina) Arturo Abella Nazar | (Argentina) Camila Abella | (Argentina) Arturo Abella Nazar | Mitsubishi Lancer Evo VI | 5:37:15.9 | +58:35.5 | 0 |
| 26 | 16 | 48 | (Argentina) Heriberto Ortiz | (Argentina) Angel Oscar Alaejos | (Argentina) Heriberto Ortiz | Mitsubishi Lancer Evo VI | 5:48:01.8 | +1:09:21.4 | 0 |
| 27 | 17 | 59 | (Argentina) Hernan Kim | (Argentina) Luciano Gennoni | (Argentina) Hernan Kim | Seat Ibiza GTi 16V | 5:55:46.0 | +1:17:05.6 | 0 |
| 28 | 18 | 31 | (Italy) Gabriele Cadringher | (Italy) Gianfranco Serembre | (Italy) Top Run SRL | Mitsubishi Lancer Evo VI | 6:02:20.3 | +1:23:39.9 | 0 |
| 29 | 19 | 70 | (Argentina) Benjamin Alvarez | (Argentina) Luis Oyola | (Argentina) Benjamin Alvarez | Seat Ibiza GTi 16V | 6:26:49.3 | +1:48:08.9 | 0 |
| 30 | 20 | 73 | (Chile) Gustavo González | (Chile) Aldo Zambra | (Chile) Gustavo González | Suzuki Swift GTi | 6:31:36.4 | +1:52:56.0 | 0 |
| 31 | 21 | 75 | (Argentina) Guillermo Bottazzini | (Argentina) Matias Martinez | (Argentina) Guillermo Bottazzini | Suzuki Swift GTi | 6:53:50.8 | +2:15:10.4 | 0 |
| 32 | 22 | 74 | (Argentina) Orlando Silvi | (Argentina) Marcelo Alvarez | (Argentina) Orlando Silvi | Suzuki Swift GTi | 7:06:09.4 | +2:27:29.0 | 0 |
| Retired SS21 | | 22 | (Argentina) Marcos Ligato | (Argentina) Rubén García | (Italy) Top Run SRL | Mitsubishi Lancer Evo VI | Gearbox | | 0 |
| Retired SS20 | | 26 | (Argentina) Sebastián Beltran | (Argentina) Ricardo Kember | (Argentina) Sebastián Beltran | Subaru Impreza WRX | Mechanical | | 0 |
| Retired SS20 | | 55 | (Argentina) Julio Sampayo | (Argentina) Ezequiel Queralt | (Argentina) Julio Sampayo | Mitsubishi Lancer Evo V | Mechanical | | 0 |
| Retired SS18 | | 38 | (Argentina) Daniel Marrochi | (Argentina) Nestor Juarez | (Argentina) Daniel Marrochi | Mitsubishi Lancer Evo VI | Mechanical | | 0 |
| Retired SS12 | | 56 | (Argentina) Gerardo Felipe | (Argentina) Gustavo Beccaria | (Argentina) Gerardo Felipe | Seat Ibiza GTi 16V | Mechanical | | 0 |
| Retired SS11 | | 37 | (Argentina) Facundo Chali | (Argentina) Gabriel Carranza | (Argentina) Facundo Chali | Subaru Impreza 555 | Mechanical | | 0 |
| Retired SS10 | | 43 | (Argentina) Ariel Larrauri | (Argentina) Pablo Curtoni | (Argentina) Ariel Larrauri | Mitsubishi Lancer Evo VI | Mechanical | | 0 |
| Retired SS10 | | 57 | (Argentina) Diego Dominguez | (Argentina) Matias Aranguren | (Argentina) Diego Dominguez | Seat Ibiza GTi 16V | Mechanical | | 0 |
| Retired SS9 | | 45 | (Chile) Ronald Kupfer Puyol | (Chile) Carlos Pena Wishniewsky | (Chile) Ronald Kupfer Puyol | Subaru Impreza 555 | Mechanical | | 0 |
| Retired SS9 | | 64 | (Argentina) Roberto Castelli | (Argentina) Julio Fossat | (Argentina) Roberto Castelli | Seat Ibiza GTi 16V | Retired | | 0 |
| Retired SS9 | | 72 | (Chile) Eduardo Cavalieri | (Chile) Eduardo Astorga Aguirre | (Chile) Eduardo Cavalieri | Daewoo Lanos | Mechanical | | 0 |
| Retired SS8 | | 53 | (Chile) Daniel Mass | (Chile) Macarena Pizarro | (Chile) Daniel Mass | Subaru Impreza 555 | Mechanical | | 0 |
| Retired SS7 | | 67 | (Argentina) Carlos Cuevas | (Argentina) Alberto Cuevas | (Argentina) Carlos Cuevas | Seat Ibiza GTi 16V | Mechanical | | 0 |
| Retired SS6 | | 25 | (Argentina) Claudio Marcelo Menzi | (Argentina) Santiago Garcia | (Argentina) Claudio Marcelo Menzi | Subaru Impreza WRX | Mechanical | | 0 |
| Retired SS6 | | 36 | (Argentina) Ricardo Bissio | (Argentina) Claudio Henin | (Argentina) Ricardo Bissio | Mitsubishi Lancer Evo V | Mechanical | | 0 |
| Retired SS6 | | 66 | (Argentina) Jorge Marchetto | (Argentina) Julián Abramián | (Argentina) Jorge Marchetto | Peugeot 306 Rallye | Mechanical | | 0 |
| Retired SS5 | | 49 | (Argentina) Alfredo Cravero | (Argentina) Cristian D'Alessandro | (Argentina) Alfredo Cravero | Subaru Impreza WRX | Mechanical | | 0 |
| Retired SS5 | | 65 | (Argentina) Jose Lacoppola | (Argentina) Jorge García Quiroga | (Argentina) Jose Lacoppola | Seat Ibiza GTi 16V | Mechanical | | 0 |
| Retired SS4 | | 23 | (Sweden) Stig Blomqvist | (Venezuela) Ana Goñi | (United Kingdom) David Sutton Cars Ltd | Mitsubishi Lancer Evo VI | Mechanical | | 0 |
| Retired SS4 | | 29 | (Argentina) Marcelo Bugliotti | (Argentina) Guillermo Piazzano | (Argentina) Marcelo Bugliotti | Mitsubishi Lancer Evo VI | Mechanical | | 0 |
| Retired SS3 | | 30 | (Argentina) Pablo Davila | (Argentina) Rodolfo Amelio Ortiz | (Argentina) Pablo Davila | Mitsubishi Lancer Evo VI | Mechanical | | 0 |

==== Special stages ====
| Day | Stage | Stage name | Length | Winner | Car | Time | Class leaders |
|---|---|---|---|---|---|---|---|
| Leg 1 (3 May) | SS1 | Complejo Pro Racing (Lane A) | 3.44 km | (Argentina) Marcos Ligato | Mitsubishi Lancer Evo VI | 2:37.1 | (Argentina) Marcos Ligato |
| Leg 1 (3 May) | SS2 | Complejo Pro Racing (Lane B) | 3.44 km | (Argentina) Marcos Ligato | Mitsubishi Lancer Evo VI | 2:34.6 | (Argentina) Marcos Ligato |
| Leg 1 (4 May) | SS3 | La Falda — Rio Ceballos | 29.96 km | (Argentina) Gabriel Pozzo | Mitsubishi Lancer Evo VI | 24:16.6 | (Argentina) Gabriel Pozzo |
| Leg 1 (4 May) | SS4 | Ascochinga — La Cumbre 1 | 28.83 km | (Argentina) Gabriel Pozzo | Mitsubishi Lancer Evo VI | 19:38.6 | (Argentina) Marcos Ligato |
| Leg 1 (4 May) | SS5 | Capilla del Monte — San Marcos Sierra | 23.02 km | (Argentina) Gabriel Pozzo | Mitsubishi Lancer Evo VI | 18:24.6 | (Argentina) Marcos Ligato |
| Leg 1 (4 May) | SS6 | San Marcos Sierra — Charbonier | 9.61 km | (Argentina) Gabriel Pozzo | Mitsubishi Lancer Evo VI | 7:07.9 | (Argentina) Marcos Ligato |
| Leg 1 (4 May) | SS7 | La Cumbre — Agua de Oro | 23.46 km | (Argentina) Gabriel Pozzo | Mitsubishi Lancer Evo VI | 21:39.3 | (Argentina) Gabriel Pozzo |
| Leg 1 (4 May) | SS8 | Ascochinga — La Cumbre 2 | 28.83 km | (Argentina) Gabriel Pozzo | Mitsubishi Lancer Evo VI | 19:31.6 | (Argentina) Gabriel Pozzo |
| Leg 2 (5 May) | SS9 | Santa Rosa de Calamuchita — San Agustin 1 | 26.10 km | (Argentina) Gabriel Pozzo | Mitsubishi Lancer Evo VI | 16:20.6 | (Argentina) Gabriel Pozzo |
| Leg 2 (5 May) | SS10 | San Agustin — Villa General Belgrano | 12.65 km | (Argentina) Gabriel Pozzo | Mitsubishi Lancer Evo VI | 10:04.1 | (Argentina) Gabriel Pozzo |
| Leg 2 (5 May) | SS11 | Amboy — Santa Rosa de Calamuchita 1 | 17.48 km | (Argentina) Gabriel Pozzo | Mitsubishi Lancer Evo VI | 10:01.2 | (Argentina) Gabriel Pozzo |
| Leg 2 (5 May) | SS12 | Santa Rosa de Calamuchita — San Agustin 2 | 26.10 km | (Argentina) Gabriel Pozzo | Mitsubishi Lancer Evo VI | 16:16.0 | (Argentina) Gabriel Pozzo |
| Leg 2 (5 May) | SS13 | Las Bajadas — Villa del Dique | 16.42 km | (Argentina) Marcos Ligato | Mitsubishi Lancer Evo VI | 9:32.3 | (Argentina) Gabriel Pozzo |
| Leg 2 (5 May) | SS14 | Amboy — Santa Rosa de Calamuchita 2 | 17.48 km | (Argentina) Gabriel Pozzo | Mitsubishi Lancer Evo VI | 10:03.7 | (Argentina) Gabriel Pozzo |
| Leg 2 (5 May) | SS15 | Camping General San Martin | 4.20 km | (Argentina) Marcos Ligato | Mitsubishi Lancer Evo VI | 3:15.1 | (Argentina) Gabriel Pozzo |
| Leg 3 (6 May) | SS16 | Cura Brochero — Cienaga de Allende | 13.63 km | (Argentina) Marcos Ligato | Mitsubishi Lancer Evo VI | 7:14.8 | (Argentina) Gabriel Pozzo |
| Leg 3 (6 May) | SS17 | El Mirador — San Lorenzo 1 | 20.65 km | (Argentina) Marcos Ligato | Mitsubishi Lancer Evo VI | 12:16.4 | (Argentina) Gabriel Pozzo |
| Leg 3 (6 May) | SS18 | Chamico — Ambul | 24.60 km | (Argentina) Marcos Ligato | Mitsubishi Lancer Evo VI | 19:13.2 | (Argentina) Gabriel Pozzo |
| Leg 3 (6 May) | SS19 | El Mirador — San Lorenzo 2 | 20.65 km | (Argentina) Marcos Ligato | Mitsubishi Lancer Evo VI | 12:15.5 | (Argentina) Gabriel Pozzo |
| Leg 3 (6 May) | SS20 | Mina Clavero — Giulio Cesare | 22.26 km | (Argentina) Marcos Ligato | Mitsubishi Lancer Evo VI | 19:21.7 | (Argentina) Gabriel Pozzo |
| Leg 3 (6 May) | SS21 | El Condor — Copina | 16.77 km | (Uruguay) Gustavo Trelles | Mitsubishi Lancer Evo VI | 14:35.6 | (Argentina) Gabriel Pozzo |

==== Championship standings ====
| Pos. | Drivers' championships | | |
| Pos. | Move | Driver | Points |
|---|---|---|---|
| 1 | | (Argentina) Gabriel Pozzo | 23 |
| 2 | | (Switzerland) Olivier Gillet | 10 |
| 3 | | (Sweden) Stig-Olov Walfridsson | 10 |
| 4 | | (Portugal) Pedro Dias da Silva | 10 |
| 5 | 5 | (Uruguay) Gustavo Trelles | 10 |
