= Gabriel Pozzo =

Argentine rally driver (1979)

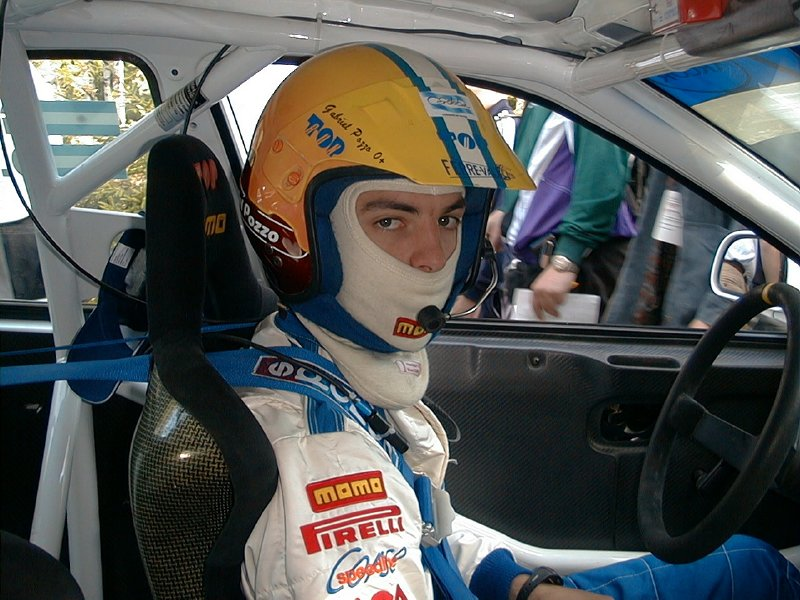
- Pozzo, in 2001 at Rally Finland

Personal information
- Nationality: (Argentina) Argentine
- Born: 26 March 1979 (age 47); Argentina

World Rally Championship record
- Years active: 1998, 2000–2009, 2013
- Co-driver: (Argentina) Fabian Cretu (Argentina) Rodolfo Amelio Ortiz (Argentina) Edgardo Galindo (Argentina) Daniel Stillo
- Teams: Škoda Motorsport
- Rallies: 48
- Championships: 0
- Rally wins: 0
- Podiums: 0
- Stage wins: 0
- Total points: 2
- First rally: 1998 Rally Argentina
- Last rally: 2013 Rally Argentina

Gabriel Pozzo (born March 26, 1979) is an Argentine rally driver competing in the World Rally Championship. His co-driver is Daniel Stillo. He is the PWRC champion of 2001 season. Pozzo was driving for Škoda Motorsport in 2002–2003.

== WRC results ==
Year	Entrant	Car	1	2	3	4	5	6	7	8	9	10	11	12	13	14	15	16	WDC	Points
1998	Gabriel Pozzo	Subaru Impreza WRX	MON	SWE	KEN	POR	ESP	FRA	ARG; Ret	GRC	NZL	FIN	ITA	AUS	GBR				–	0
2000	Gabriel Pozzo	Mitsubishi Lancer Evo VI	MON	SWE	KEN; Ret	POR; Ret	ESP; 28	ARG; 10	GRE; 11	NZL	FIN; Ret	CYP; 12	FRA; 29	ITA; Ret	AUS; 21	GBR			–	0
2001	Top Run	Mitsubishi Lancer Evo VI	MON; 12	SWE	POR; Ret	ESP; 18	ARG; 10	CYP; 13	GRC; 13	KEN; 6	FIN; 26	NZL; 18	ITA; 23	FRA	AUS; 18	GBR			24th	1
2002	Škoda Motorsport	Škoda Octavia WRC	MON	SWE	FRA	ESP; Ret	CYP; 19		GRC; Ret	KEN	FIN	GER	ITA	NZL	AUS	GBR			–	0
2002	Škoda Motorsport	Škoda Octavia WRC Evo2						ARG; 9											–	0
2003	Škoda Motorsport	Škoda Octavia WRC Evo3	MON	SWE	TUR	NZL	ARG; Ret	GRC	CYP	GER	FIN	AUS	ITA	FRA	ESP	GBR			–	0
2004	Gabriel Pozzo	Subaru Impreza WRX STi	MON	SWE	MEX	NZL	CYP	GRE	TUR	ARG; 8	FIN	GER	JPN	GBR	ITA	FRA	ESP	AUS	34th	1
2005	Subaru Argentina Rally Team	Subaru Impreza WRX STi	MON	SWE	MEX	NZL; Ret	ITA	CYP; 17	TUR; Ret	GRE	ARG; 23	FIN	GER	GBR	JPN; Ret	FRA	ESP	AUS; 11	–	0
2006	Gabriel Pozzo	Mitsubishi Lancer Evo IX	MON	SWE	MEX; Ret	ESP	FRA	ARG; Ret	ITA	GRE; 18	GER	FIN	JPN; 9	CYP	TUR	AUS; DSQ	NZL	GBR	–	0
2007	Tango Rally Team	Mitsubishi Lancer Evo IX	MON	SWE	NOR	MEX	POR	ARG; 13	ITA	GRE; 23	FIN	GER	NZL; 16	ESP	FRA	JPN; 9	IRE; 11	GBR; Ret	–	0
2008	Barattero	Subaru Impreza STi N14	MON	SWE	MEX	ARG; Ret	JOR	ITA	GRE	TUR	FIN	GER	NZL	ESP	FRA	JPN	GBR		–	0
2009	Barattero	Subaru Impreza STi N14	IRE	NOR	CYP	POR	ARG; Ret	ITA	GRE	POL	FIN	AUS	ESP	GBR					–	0
2013	Qatar M-Sport WRT	Ford Fiesta RS WRC	MON	SWE	MEX	POR	ARG; 11	GRE	ITA	FIN	GER	AUS	FRA	ESP	GBR				–	0

=== PWRC results ===
Year	Entrant	Car	1	2	3	4	5	6	7	8	9	10	11	12	13	14	Pos.	Points
2000	Gabriel Pozzo	Mitsubishi Lancer Evo VI	MON	SWE	KEN; Ret	POR; Ret	ESP; 9	ARG; 2	GRE; 1	NZL	FIN; Ret	CYP; 2	FRA; 9	ITA; Ret	AUS; 7	GBR	3rd	22
2001	Top Run	Mitsubishi Lancer Evo VI	MON; 4	SWE	POR; Ret	ESP; 1	ARG; 1	CYP; 3	GRC; 1	KEN; 1	FIN; 2	NZL; 2	ITA; 1	FRA	AUS; 2	GBR	1st	75
2005	Subaru Argentina Rally Team	Subaru Impreza WRX STi	SWE	NZL; Ret	CYP; 4	TUR; Ret	ARG; 5	GBR	JPN; Ret	AUS; 3							10th	15
2006	Gabriel Pozzo	Mitsubishi Lancer Evo IX	MON	MEX; Ret	ARG; Ret	GRE; 2	JPN; 2	CYP	AUS; DSQ	NZL							DSQ	0
2007	Tango Rally Team	Mitsubishi Lancer Evo IX	SWE	MEX	ARG; 4	GRE; 7	NZL; 4	JPN; 1	IRE; 2	GBR; Ret							2nd	30
2009	Barattero	Subaru Impreza STi N14	NOR	CYP	POR	ARG; Ret	ITA	GRE	AUS	GBR							–	0

=== IRC results ===
Year	Entrant	Car	1	2	3	4	5	6	7	8	9	10	11	12	WDC	Points
2010	(Argentina) Barattero	Subaru Impreza STi N14	MON	BRA	ARG; 4	CAN	ITA	BEL	AZO	MAD	CZE	ITA	SCO	CYP	19th	5
