= 2000 Rally Argentina =

6th round of the 2000 World Rally Championship

2000 Rally Argentina 20th Rally Argentina
Round 6 of the 2000 World Rally Championship season
← Previous event	Next event →
- Host country: Argentina
- Rally base: Villa Carlos Paz
- Dates run: May 11 2000 – May 14 2000
- Stages: 22 (385.49 km; 239.53 miles)
- Stage surface: Gravel
- Overall distance: 1,552.13 km (964.45 miles)

Statistics
- Crews: 76 at start, 35 at finish

Overall results
- Overall winner: (United Kingdom) Richard Burns (United Kingdom) Robert Reid (Japan) Subaru World Rally Team; Subaru Impreza S6 WRC '00

The 2000 Rally Argentina (formally the 20th Rally Argentina) was the sixth round of the 2000 World Rally Championship. The race was held over four days between 11 May and 14 May 2000, and was won by Subaru's Richard Burns, his 8th win in the World Rally Championship.

== Background ==
=== Entry list ===
No.	Driver	Co-Driver	Entrant	Car	Tyre
World Rally Championship manufacturer entries
1	(Finland) Tommi Mäkinen	(Finland) Risto Mannisenmäki	(Japan) Marlboro Mitsubishi Ralliart	Mitsubishi Lancer Evo VI	MI
2	(Belgium) Freddy Loix	(Belgium) Sven Smeets	(Japan) Marlboro Mitsubishi Ralliart	Mitsubishi Carisma GT Evo VI	MI
3	(United Kingdom) Richard Burns	(United Kingdom) Robert Reid	(Japan) Subaru World Rally Team	Subaru Impreza S6 WRC '00	P
4	(Finland) Juha Kankkunen	(Finland) Juha Repo	(Japan) Subaru World Rally Team	Subaru Impreza S6 WRC '00	P
5	(United Kingdom) Colin McRae	(United Kingdom) Nicky Grist	(United Kingdom) Ford Motor Co. Ltd.	Ford Focus RS WRC '00	MI
6	(Spain) Carlos Sainz	(Spain) Luis Moya	(United Kingdom) Ford Motor Co. Ltd.	Ford Focus RS WRC '00	MI
7	(France) Didier Auriol	(France) Denis Giraudet	(Spain) SEAT Sport	SEAT Córdoba WRC Evo2	P
8	(Finland) Toni Gardemeister	(Finland) Paavo Lukander	(Spain) SEAT Sport	SEAT Córdoba WRC Evo2	P
9	(France) François Delecour	(France) Daniel Grataloup	(France) Peugeot Esso	Peugeot 206 WRC	MI
10	(Finland) Marcus Grönholm	(Finland) Timo Rautiainen	(France) Peugeot Esso	Peugeot 206 WRC	MI
14	(Sweden) Kenneth Eriksson	(Sweden) Staffan Parmander	(South Korea) Hyundai Castrol World Rally Team	Hyundai Accent WRC	MI
15	(United Kingdom) Alister McRae	(United Kingdom) David Senior	(South Korea) Hyundai Castrol World Rally Team	Hyundai Accent WRC	MI
World Rally Championship entries
16	(Norway) Petter Solberg	(United Kingdom) Phil Mills	(United Kingdom) Ford Motor Co. Ltd.	Ford Focus RS WRC '00	MI
17	(France) Frédéric Dor	(France) Kevin Gormley	(France) F. Dor Rally Team	Subaru Impreza S5 WRC '99	—N/a
18	(Poland) Krzysztof Hołowczyc	(Belgium) Jean-Marc Fortin	(Poland) Wizja TV / Turning Point RT	Subaru Impreza S5 WRC '99	MI
19	(Greece) Ioannis Papadimitriou	(Greece) Nikolaos Petropoulos	(Greece) Ioannis Papadimitriou	Subaru Impreza 555	—N/a
20	(Turkey) Serkan Yazici	(Turkey) Erkan Bodur	(Turkey) Team Atakan	Toyota Corolla WRC	—N/a
21	(Argentina) Jorge Recalde	(Argentina) Diego Curletto	(Argentina) Jorge Recalde	Ford Escort RS Cosworth	—N/a
32	(United Kingdom) Nigel Heath	(United Kingdom) Jeff Ashfield	(United Kingdom) Nigel Heath	Subaru Impreza WRX	—N/a
57	(Argentina) Martin Galluser	(Argentina) Sergio Gora	(Argentina) Martin Galluser	Mitsubishi Lancer Evo III	—N/a
Group N Cup entries
22	(Uruguay) Gustavo Trelles	(Argentina) Jorge Del Buono	(Uruguay) Gustavo Trelles	Mitsubishi Lancer Evo VI	P
23	(Austria) Manfred Stohl	(Austria) Peter Müller	(Austria) Manfred Stohl	Mitsubishi Lancer Evo VI	—N/a
24	(Argentina) Roberto Sanchez	(Argentina) Ruben Garcia	(Argentina) Roberto Sanchez	Subaru Impreza WRX	—N/a
25	(Argentina) Claudio Marcelo Menzi	(Argentina) Edgardo Galindo	(Argentina) Claudio Marcelo Menzi	Mitsubishi Lancer Evo VI	—N/a
27	(Argentina) Gabriel Raies	(Argentina) Jose Maria Volta	(Argentina) Gabriel Raies	Mitsubishi Lancer Evo VI	—N/a
28	(Italy) Andrea Aghini	(Italy) Loris Roggia	(Italy) Andrea Aghini	Mitsubishi Carisma GT Evo VI	—N/a
29	(Peru) Ramón Ferreyros	(Peru) Gonzalo Saenz	(Peru) Ramón Ferreyros	Mitsubishi Lancer Evo VI	—N/a
30	(Uruguay) Gabriel Mendez	(Uruguay) Daniel Muzio	(Uruguay) Gabriel Mendez	Mitsubishi Lancer Evo V	—N/a
33	(Argentina) Marcos Ligato	(Argentina) Santiago Garcia	(Argentina) Marcos Ligato	Mitsubishi Lancer Evo IV	—N/a
34	(Argentina) Gabriel Pozzo	(Argentina) Rodolfo Amelio Ortiz	(Argentina) Gabriel Pozzo	Mitsubishi Lancer Evo VI	P
35	(United Kingdom) John Lloyd	(United Kingdom) Pauline Gullick	(United Kingdom) John Lloyd	Mitsubishi Lancer Evo V	—N/a
37	(Brazil) Ulysses Bertholdo	(Brazil) Nilo de Paula	(Brazil) Ulysses Bertholdo	Mitsubishi Lancer Evo V	—N/a
38	(Argentina) Matias Sas	(Argentina) Angel Oscar Alaejos	(Argentina) Matias Sas	Subaru Impreza WRX	—N/a
39	(Argentina) Gerardo Klus	(Argentina) Raul Ruani	(Argentina) Gerardo Klus	Mitsubishi Lancer Evo VI	—N/a
40	(Argentina) Andres Gimenez	(Argentina) Jorge García Quiroga	(Argentina) Andres Gimenez	Mitsubishi Lancer Evo V	—N/a
42	(Argentina) Oscar Chiaramello	(Argentina) Ruben Quiroz	(Argentina) Oscar Chiaramello	Mitsubishi Lancer Evo VI	—N/a
43	(Argentina) Esteban Goldenhersch	(Argentina) Jose Maria Rodriguez	(Argentina) Esteban Goldenhersch	Subaru Impreza WRX	—N/a
44	(Argentina) Orlando Cravero	(Argentina) Fernando Lorenzatto	(Argentina) Orlando Cravero	Subaru Impreza WRX	—N/a
45	(Argentina) Marcelo Bugliotti	(Argentina) Guillermo Piazzano	(Argentina) Marcelo Bugliotti	Mitsubishi Lancer Evo VI	—N/a
46	(Argentina) Miguel Torras	(Argentina) Daniel Gait	(Argentina) Miguel Torras	Subaru Impreza WRX	—N/a
47	(Argentina) Mario Baldo	(Argentina) Fernando Escobar	(Argentina) Mario Baldo	Mitsubishi Lancer Evo VI	—N/a
49	(Argentina) Pablo Escuti	(Argentina) Pablo Nocelli	(Argentina) Pablo Escuti	Mitsubishi Lancer Evo IV	—N/a
50	(Argentina) Daniel Marrochi	(Argentina) Pablo Sciangula	(Argentina) Daniel Marrochi	Mitsubishi Lancer Evo V	—N/a
51	(Argentina) Sebastián Beltran	(Argentina) Gabriel Carranza	(Argentina) Sebastián Beltran	Subaru Impreza WRX	—N/a
52	(Argentina) Juan Martin Odriozola	(Argentina) Carlos Chioli	(Argentina) Juan Martin Odriozola	Mitsubishi Lancer Evo IV	—N/a
53	(Argentina) Ariel Larrauri	(Argentina) Pablo Curtoni	(Argentina) Ariel Larrauri	Mitsubishi Lancer Evo IV	—N/a
54	(Argentina) Federico Villagra	(Argentina) Javier Villagra	(Argentina) Federico Villagra	Mitsubishi Lancer Evo VI	—N/a
55	(Brazil) Claudio Rossi	(Brazil) Thiago Maria	(Brazil) Claudio Rossi	Mitsubishi Lancer Evo V	—N/a
58	(Argentina) Alfredo Cravero	(Argentina) Cristian D'Alessandro	(Argentina) Alfredo Cravero	Subaru Impreza WRX	—N/a
59	(Argentina) Alberto De Simone	(Argentina) Juan Gorbaran	(Argentina) Alberto De Simone	Mitsubishi Lancer Evo III	—N/a
62	(Argentina) Pablo Gaviña	(Argentina) Adriana Iriart Urruty	(Argentina) Pablo Gaviña	Mitsubishi Lancer Evo III	—N/a
63	(Argentina) Javier Cano	(Argentina) Alberto Alvarez Nicholson	(Argentina) Javier Cano	Mitsubishi Lancer Evo V	—N/a
65	(Argentina) Jose Luis Catera	(Argentina) Alfredo Castro	(Argentina) Jose Luis Catera	Mitsubishi Lancer Evo III	—N/a
68	(Argentina) Nestor Sampayo	(Argentina) Oscar Qunones	(Argentina) Nestor Sampayo	Mitsubishi Lancer Evo V	—N/a
78	(Argentina) Juan Carlos Biondi	(Argentina) Sebastian Zuzino	(Argentina) Juan Carlos Biondi	Renault Clio Williams	—N/a
79	(Argentina) Federico Hubmann	(Argentina) Nestor Juarez	(Argentina) Federico Hubmann	SEAT Ibiza GTi 16V	—N/a
80	(Argentina) Gerardo Felipe	(Argentina) Gustavo Beccaria	(Argentina) Gerardo Felipe	SEAT Ibiza GTi 16V	—N/a
81	(Argentina) Miguel Quattrocchio	(Argentina) Roberto Bulacio	(Argentina) Miguel Quattrocchio	SEAT Ibiza GTi 16V	—N/a
82	(Argentina) Diego Kopousshian	(Argentina) Luis Fernando Lobbe	(Argentina) Diego Kopousshian	SEAT Ibiza GTi 16V	—N/a
83	(Argentina) Gerardo Landriscina	(Argentina) Claudio Bustos	(Argentina) Gerardo Landriscina	SEAT Ibiza GTi 16V	—N/a
84	(Argentina) Diego Domínguez	(Argentina) Luis Moyano	(Argentina) Diego Domínguez	SEAT Ibiza GTi 16V	—N/a
85	(Argentina) Heriberto Ortiz	(Argentina) Juan Ortiz	(Argentina) Heriberto Ortiz	Renault Clio Williams	—N/a
86	(Argentina) Roberto Castelli	(Argentina) Julio Fossat	(Argentina) Roberto Castelli	SEAT Ibiza GTi 16V	—N/a
87	(Argentina) Arturo Abella Nazar	(Argentina) Camila Abella	(Argentina) Arturo Abella Nazar	Renault Clio Williams	—N/a
88	(Argentina) Carlos Cuevas	(Argentina) Alberto Cuevas	(Argentina) Carlos Cuevas	SEAT Ibiza GTi 16V	—N/a
89	(Argentina) Carlos Zegbi	(Argentina) Luciano Elorriaga	(Argentina) Carlos Zegbi	SEAT Ibiza GTi 16V	—N/a
91	(Paraguay) Alessandro Massagrande	(Paraguay) Hernán Vargas Peña	(Paraguay) Alessandro Massagrande	Opel Corsa GSi	—N/a
92	(Chile) Eduardo G. Aguirre	(Chile) Eduardo Astorga Aguirre	(Chile) Eduardo G. Aguirre	Daewoo Lanos	—N/a
93	(Argentina) Orlando Silvi	(Argentina) Marcelo Alvarez	(Argentina) Orlando Silvi	Suzuki Swift GTi	—N/a
94	(Argentina) Guillermo Bottazzini	(Argentina) Matias Martinez	(Argentina) Guillermo Bottazzini	Suzuki Swift GTi	—N/a

=== Itinerary ===
All dates and times are ART (UTC−3).

Date	Time	No.	Stage name	Distance
Leg 1 — 133.73 km
11 May	19:00	SS1	SSS Pro-Racing — Lane A	3.44 km
11 May	19:01	SS2	SSS Pro-Racing — Lane B	3.44 km
12 May	09:03	SS3	Capilla del Monte — San Marcos Sierra	23.02 km
12 May	09:34	SS4	San Marcos Sierra — Charbonier	9.61 km
12 May	11:31	SS5	Tanti — Cosquin	16.00 km
12 May	12:24	SS6	Villa Giardino — La Falda	22.53 km
12 May	14:07	SS7	La Cumbre — Agua de Oro	23.46 km
12 May	15:10	SS8	Colonia Caroya	3.40 km
12 May	15:58	SS9	Ascochinga — La Cumbre	28.83 km
Leg 2 — 131.34 km
13 May	09:16	SS10	Santa Rosa de Calamuchita — San Agustin 1	26.10 km
13 May	10:01	SS11	San Agustin — Villa General Belgrano	12.46 km
13 May	11:26	SS12	Amboy — Santa Rosa de Calamuchita 1	21.48 km
13 May	12:45	SS13	Santa Rosa de Calamuchita — San Agustin 2	26.10 km
13 May	13:28	SS14	Las Bajadas — Villa del Dique	18.67 km
13 May	14:49	SS15	Amboy — Santa Rosa de Calamuchita 2	21.48 km
13 May	16:00	SS16	Camping General San Martin	5.05 km
Leg 3 — 120.42 km
14 May	09:09	SS17	Chamico — Ambul	24.60 km
14 May	09:51	SS18	El Mirador — San Lorenzo 1	20.65 km
14 May	10:50	SS19	Cura Brochero — Nono	18.71 km
14 May	11:58	SS20	La Posta — Mina Clavero	19.04 km
14 May	13:46	SS21	El Mirador — San Lorenzo 2	20.65 km
14 May	15:04	SS22	El Condor — Copina	16.77 km

== Results ==
=== Overall ===
Pos.	No.	Driver	Co-driver	Team	Car	Time	Difference	Points
1	3	(United Kingdom) Richard Burns	(United Kingdom) Robert Reid	(Japan) Subaru World Rally Team	Subaru Impreza S6 WRC '00	4:10:20.7		10
2	10	(Finland) Marcus Grönholm	(Finland) Timo Rautiainen	(France) Peugeot Esso	Peugeot 206 WRC	4:11:28.1	+1:07.4	6
3	1	(Finland) Tommi Mäkinen	(Finland) Risto Mannisenmäki	(Japan) Marlboro Mitsubishi Ralliart	Mitsubishi Lancer Evo VI	4:11:52.3	+1:31.6	4
4	4	(Finland) Juha Kankkunen	(Finland) Juha Repo	(Japan) Subaru World Rally Team	Subaru Impreza S6 WRC '00	4:12:43.5	+2:22.8	3
5	2	(Belgium) Freddy Loix	(Belgium) Sven Smeets	(Japan) Marlboro Mitsubishi Ralliart	Mitsubishi Carisma GT Evo VI	4:18:54.3	+8:33.6	2
6	16	(Norway) Petter Solberg	(United Kingdom) Phil Mills	(United Kingdom) Ford Motor Co. Ltd.	Ford Focus RS WRC '00	4:21:20.3	+10:59.6	1

=== World Rally Cars ===
==== Classification ====
Position		No.	Driver	Co-driver	Entrant	Car	Time	Difference	Points
Event	Class	No.	Driver	Co-driver	Entrant	Car	Time	Difference	Points
1	1	3	(United Kingdom) Richard Burns	(United Kingdom) Robert Reid	(Japan) Subaru World Rally Team	Subaru Impreza S6 WRC '00	4:10:20.7		10
2	2	10	(Finland) Marcus Grönholm	(Finland) Timo Rautiainen	(France) Peugeot Esso	Peugeot 206 WRC	4:11:28.1	+1:07.4	6
3	3	1	(Finland) Tommi Mäkinen	(Finland) Risto Mannisenmäki	(Japan) Marlboro Mitsubishi Ralliart	Mitsubishi Lancer Evo VI	4:11:52.3	+1:31.6	4
4	4	4	(Finland) Juha Kankkunen	(Finland) Juha Repo	(Japan) Subaru World Rally Team	Subaru Impreza S6 WRC '00	4:12:43.5	+2:22.8	3
5	5	2	(Belgium) Freddy Loix	(Belgium) Sven Smeets	(Japan) Marlboro Mitsubishi Ralliart	Mitsubishi Carisma GT Evo VI	4:18:54.3	+8:33.6	2
7	6	15	(United Kingdom) Alister McRae	(United Kingdom) David Senior	(South Korea) Hyundai Castrol World Rally Team	Hyundai Accent WRC	4:23:38.5	+13:17.8	0
8	7	14	(Sweden) Kenneth Eriksson	(Sweden) Staffan Parmander	(South Korea) Hyundai Castrol World Rally Team	Hyundai Accent WRC	4:30:55.8	+20:35.1	0
13	8	9	(France) François Delecour	(France) Daniel Grataloup	(France) Peugeot Esso	Peugeot 206 WRC	4:37:40.1	+27:19.4	0
Retired SS17		5	(United Kingdom) Colin McRae	(United Kingdom) Nicky Grist	(United Kingdom) Ford Motor Co. Ltd.	Ford Focus RS WRC '00	Engine		0
Retired SS11		6	(Spain) Carlos Sainz	(Spain) Luis Moya	(United Kingdom) Ford Motor Co. Ltd.	Ford Focus RS WRC '00	Radiator		0
Retired SS6		7	(France) Didier Auriol	(France) Denis Giraudet	(Spain) SEAT Sport	SEAT Córdoba WRC Evo2	Clutch		0
Retired SS6		8	(Finland) Toni Gardemeister	(Finland) Paavo Lukander	(Spain) SEAT Sport	SEAT Córdoba WRC Evo2	Clutch		0

==== Special stages ====
Day	Stage	Stage name	Length	Winner	Car	Time	Class leaders
Leg 1 (11 May)	SS1	SSS Pro-Racing — Lane A	3.44 km	(United Kingdom) Richard Burns	Subaru Impreza S6 WRC '00	2:29.1	(United Kingdom) Richard Burns
Leg 1 (11 May)	SS2	SSS Pro-Racing — Lane B	3.44 km	(United Kingdom) Richard Burns	Subaru Impreza S6 WRC '00	2:26.5	(United Kingdom) Richard Burns
Leg 1 (12 May)	SS3	Capilla del Monte — San Marcos Sierra	23.02 km	(Finland) Marcus Grönholm	Peugeot 206 WRC	17:37.2	(Finland) Marcus Grönholm
Leg 1 (12 May)	SS4	San Marcos Sierra — Charbonier	9.61 km	(United Kingdom) Richard Burns	Subaru Impreza S6 WRC '00	6:41.3	(Finland) Marcus Grönholm
Leg 1 (12 May)	SS5	Tanti — Cosquin	16.00 km	Stage cancelled			(Finland) Marcus Grönholm
Leg 1 (12 May)	SS6	Villa Giardino — La Falda	22.53 km	(Spain) Carlos Sainz	Ford Focus RS WRC '00	16:16.0	(Finland) Marcus Grönholm
Leg 1 (12 May)	SS7	La Cumbre — Agua de Oro	23.46 km	(Spain) Carlos Sainz	Ford Focus RS WRC '00	20:19.8	(Spain) Carlos Sainz
Leg 1 (12 May)	SS8	Colonia Caroya	3.40 km	(Finland) Marcus Grönholm	Peugeot 206 WRC	2:29.8	(Spain) Carlos Sainz
Leg 1 (12 May)	SS9	Ascochinga — La Cumbre	28.83 km	(Spain) Carlos Sainz	Ford Focus RS WRC '00	19:06.1	(Spain) Carlos Sainz
Leg 2 (13 May)	SS10	Santa Rosa de Calamuchita — San Agustin 1	26.10 km	(United Kingdom) Richard Burns	Subaru Impreza S6 WRC '00	15:24.9	(Finland) Marcus Grönholm
Leg 2 (13 May)	SS11	San Agustin — Villa General Belgrano	12.46 km	(United Kingdom) Colin McRae	Ford Focus RS WRC '00	9:47.9	(Finland) Marcus Grönholm
Leg 2 (13 May)	SS12	Amboy — Santa Rosa de Calamuchita 1	21.48 km	(United Kingdom) Richard Burns	Subaru Impreza S6 WRC '00	11:19.1	(Finland) Marcus Grönholm
Leg 2 (13 May)	SS13	Santa Rosa de Calamuchita — San Agustin 2	26.10 km	(United Kingdom) Richard Burns	Subaru Impreza S6 WRC '00	15:29.1	(Finland) Marcus Grönholm
Leg 2 (13 May)	SS14	Las Bajadas — Villa del Dique	18.67 km	(United Kingdom) Richard Burns	Subaru Impreza S6 WRC '00	10:04.3	(Finland) Marcus Grönholm
Leg 2 (13 May)	SS15	Amboy — Santa Rosa de Calamuchita 2	21.48 km	(United Kingdom) Richard Burns	Subaru Impreza S6 WRC '00	11:14.4	(United Kingdom) Richard Burns
Leg 2 (13 May)	SS16	Camping General San Martin	5.05 km	(United Kingdom) Richard Burns	Subaru Impreza S6 WRC '00	4:13.0	(United Kingdom) Richard Burns
Leg 3 (14 May)	SS17	Chamico — Ambul	24.60 km	(United Kingdom) Richard Burns	Subaru Impreza S6 WRC '00	18:06.4	(United Kingdom) Richard Burns
Leg 3 (14 May)	SS18	El Mirador — San Lorenzo 1	20.65 km	(United Kingdom) Richard Burns	Subaru Impreza S6 WRC '00	12:02.1	(United Kingdom) Richard Burns
Leg 3 (14 May)	SS19	Cura Brochero — Nono	18.71 km	(United Kingdom) Richard Burns	Subaru Impreza S6 WRC '00	9:44.7	(United Kingdom) Richard Burns
Leg 3 (14 May)	SS20	La Posta — Mina Clavero	19.04 km	(Finland) Marcus Grönholm	Peugeot 206 WRC	16:45.7	(United Kingdom) Richard Burns
Leg 3 (14 May)	SS21	El Mirador — San Lorenzo 2	20.65 km	(Finland) Tommi Mäkinen	Mitsubishi Lancer Evo VI	12:12.0	(United Kingdom) Richard Burns
Leg 3 (14 May)	SS22	El Condor — Copina	16.77 km	(United Kingdom) Richard Burns	Subaru Impreza S6 WRC '00	15:12.6	(United Kingdom) Richard Burns

==== Championship standings ====
Pos.	Drivers' championships			Co-drivers' championships			Manufacturers' championships		
Pos.	Move	Driver	Points	Move	Co-driver	Points	Move	Manufacturer	Points
1		(United Kingdom) Richard Burns	38		(United Kingdom) Robert Reid	38		(Japan) Subaru World Rally Team	54
2	1	(Finland) Marcus Grönholm	24	1	(Finland) Timo Rautiainen	24		(United Kingdom) Ford Motor Co. Ltd.	31
3	1	(Finland) Tommi Mäkinen	23	1	(Finland) Risto Mannisenmäki	23	1	(France) Peugeot Esso	29
4		(Spain) Carlos Sainz	17		(Spain) Luis Moya	17	1	(Japan) Marlboro Mitsubishi Ralliart	29
5		(United Kingdom) Colin McRae	14		(United Kingdom) Nicky Grist	14		(Spain) SEAT Sport	7

=== FIA Cup for Production Rally Drivers ===
==== Classification ====
Position		No.	Driver	Co-driver	Entrant	Car	Time	Difference	Points
Event	Class	No.	Driver	Co-driver	Entrant	Car	Time	Difference	Points
9	1	22	(Uruguay) Gustavo Trelles	(Argentina) Jorge Del Buono	(Uruguay) Gustavo Trelles	Mitsubishi Lancer Evo VI	4:32:00.2		10
10	2	34	(Argentina) Gabriel Pozzo	(Argentina) Rodolfo Amelio Ortiz	(Argentina) Gabriel Pozzo	Mitsubishi Lancer Evo VI	4:33:01.1	+1:00.9	6
12	3	24	(Argentina) Roberto Sanchez	(Argentina) Ruben Garcia	(Argentina) Roberto Sanchez	Subaru Impreza WRX	4:37:16.7	+5:16.5	4
15	4	29	(Peru) Ramón Ferreyros	(Peru) Gonzalo Saenz	(Peru) Ramón Ferreyros	Mitsubishi Lancer Evo VI	4:44:43.8	+12:43.6	3
17	5	42	(Argentina) Oscar Chiaramello	(Argentina) Ruben Quiroz	(Argentina) Oscar Chiaramello	Mitsubishi Lancer Evo VI	4:51:24.8	+19:24.6	2
19	6	51	(Argentina) Sebastián Beltran	(Argentina) Gabriel Carranza	(Argentina) Sebastián Beltran	Subaru Impreza WRX	4:58:37.4	+26:37.2	1
20	7	46	(Argentina) Miguel Torras	(Argentina) Daniel Gait	(Argentina) Miguel Torras	Subaru Impreza WRX	4:58:59.0	+26:58.8	0
21	8	37	(Brazil) Ulysses Bertholdo	(Brazil) Nilo de Paula	(Brazil) Ulysses Bertholdo	Mitsubishi Lancer Evo V	5:02:03.2	+30:03.0	0
22	9	54	(Argentina) Federico Villagra	(Argentina) Javier Villagra	(Argentina) Federico Villagra	Mitsubishi Lancer Evo VI	5:03:53.6	+31:53.4	0
23	10	50	(Argentina) Daniel Marrochi	(Argentina) Pablo Sciangula	(Argentina) Daniel Marrochi	Mitsubishi Lancer Evo V	5:05:47.5	+33:47.3	0
25	11	35	(United Kingdom) John Lloyd	(United Kingdom) Pauline Gullick	(United Kingdom) John Lloyd	Mitsubishi Lancer Evo V	5:17:00.2	+45:00.0	0
26	12	52	(Argentina) Juan Martin Odriozola	(Argentina) Carlos Chioli	(Argentina) Juan Martin Odriozola	Mitsubishi Lancer Evo IV	5:27:18.2	+55:18.0	0
28	13	58	(Argentina) Alfredo Cravero	(Argentina) Cristian D'Alessandro	(Argentina) Alfredo Cravero	Subaru Impreza WRX	5:30:42.2	+58:42.0	0
29	14	81	(Argentina) Miguel Quattrocchio	(Argentina) Roberto Bulacio	(Argentina) Miguel Quattrocchio	SEAT Ibiza GTi 16V	5:43:37.4	+1:11:37.2	0
31	15	83	(Argentina) Gerardo Landriscina	(Argentina) Claudio Bustos	(Argentina) Gerardo Landriscina	SEAT Ibiza GTi 16V	5:53:27.9	+1:21:27.7	0
32	16	86	(Argentina) Roberto Castelli	(Argentina) Julio Fossat	(Argentina) Roberto Castelli	SEAT Ibiza GTi 16V	5:53:39.0	+1:21:38.8	0
34	17	68	(Argentina) Nestor Sampayo	(Argentina) Oscar Qunones	(Argentina) Nestor Sampayo	Mitsubishi Lancer Evo V	5:58:03.2	+1:26:03.0	0
35	18	87	(Argentina) Arturo Abella Nazar	(Argentina) Camila Abella	(Argentina) Arturo Abella Nazar	Renault Clio Williams	6:36:10.5	+2:04:10.3	0
Retired SS21		30	(Uruguay) Gabriel Mendez	(Uruguay) Daniel Muzio	(Uruguay) Gabriel Mendez	Mitsubishi Lancer Evo V	Mechanical		0
Retired SS20		85	(Argentina) Heriberto Ortiz	(Argentina) Juan Ortiz	(Argentina) Heriberto Ortiz	Renault Clio Williams	Mechanical		0
Retired SS20		88	(Argentina) Carlos Cuevas	(Argentina) Alberto Cuevas	(Argentina) Carlos Cuevas	SEAT Ibiza GTi 16V	Mechanical		0
Retired SS18		65	(Argentina) Jose Luis Catera	(Argentina) Alfredo Castro	(Argentina) Jose Luis Catera	Mitsubishi Lancer Evo III	Accident		0
Retired SS17		33	(Argentina) Marcos Ligato	(Argentina) Santiago Garcia	(Argentina) Marcos Ligato	Mitsubishi Lancer Evo IV	Mechanical		0
Retired SS17		38	(Argentina) Matias Sas	(Argentina) Angel Oscar Alaejos	(Argentina) Matias Sas	Subaru Impreza WRX	Mechanical		0
Retired SS17		39	(Argentina) Gerardo Klus	(Argentina) Raul Ruani	(Argentina) Gerardo Klus	Mitsubishi Lancer Evo VI	Accident		0
Retired SS17		80	(Argentina) Gerardo Felipe	(Argentina) Gustavo Beccaria	(Argentina) Gerardo Felipe	SEAT Ibiza GTi 16V	Mechanical		0
Retired SS17		84	(Argentina) Diego Domínguez	(Argentina) Luis Moyano	(Argentina) Diego Domínguez	SEAT Ibiza GTi 16V	Mechanical		0
Retired SS17		94	(Argentina) Guillermo Bottazzini	(Argentina) Matias Martinez	(Argentina) Guillermo Bottazzini	Suzuki Swift GTi	Mechanical		0
Retired SS13		23	(Austria) Manfred Stohl	(Austria) Peter Müller	(Austria) Manfred Stohl	Mitsubishi Lancer Evo VI	Mechanical		0
Retired SS13		79	(Argentina) Federico Hubmann	(Argentina) Nestor Juarez	(Argentina) Federico Hubmann	SEAT Ibiza GTi 16V	Accident		0
Retired SS13		82	(Argentina) Diego Kopousshian	(Argentina) Luis Fernando Lobbe	(Argentina) Diego Kopousshian	SEAT Ibiza GTi 16V	Mechanical		0
Retired SS12		63	(Argentina) Javier Cano	(Argentina) Alberto Alvarez Nicholson	(Argentina) Javier Cano	Mitsubishi Lancer Evo V	Mechanical		0
Retired SS10		53	(Argentina) Ariel Larrauri	(Argentina) Pablo Curtoni	(Argentina) Ariel Larrauri	Mitsubishi Lancer Evo IV	Mechanical		0
Retired SS10		89	(Argentina) Carlos Zegbi	(Argentina) Luciano Elorriaga	(Argentina) Carlos Zegbi	SEAT Ibiza GTi 16V	Mechanical		0
Retired SS10		92	(Chile) Eduardo G. Aguirre	(Chile) Eduardo Astorga Aguirre	(Chile) Eduardo G. Aguirre	Daewoo Lanos	Mechanical		0
Retired SS9		28	(Italy) Andrea Aghini	(Italy) Loris Roggia	(Italy) Andrea Aghini	Mitsubishi Carisma GT Evo VI	Accident		0
Retired SS9		59	(Argentina) Alberto De Simone	(Argentina) Juan Gorbaran	(Argentina) Alberto De Simone	Mitsubishi Lancer Evo III	Mechanical		0
Retired SS7		25	(Argentina) Claudio Marcelo Menzi	(Argentina) Edgardo Galindo	(Argentina) Claudio Marcelo Menzi	Mitsubishi Lancer Evo VI	Turbo		0
Retired SS7		27	(Argentina) Gabriel Raies	(Argentina) Jose Maria Volta	(Argentina) Gabriel Raies	Mitsubishi Lancer Evo VI	Mechanical		0
Retired SS7		40	(Argentina) Andres Gimenez	(Argentina) Jorge García Quiroga	(Argentina) Andres Gimenez	Mitsubishi Lancer Evo V	Accident		0
Retired SS7		47	(Argentina) Mario Baldo	(Argentina) Fernando Escobar	(Argentina) Mario Baldo	Mitsubishi Lancer Evo VI	Mechanical		0
Retired SS7		62	(Argentina) Pablo Gaviña	(Argentina) Adriana Iriart Urruty	(Argentina) Pablo Gaviña	Mitsubishi Lancer Evo III	Accident		0
Retired SS7		91	(Paraguay) Alessandro Massagrande	(Paraguay) Hernán Vargas Peña	(Paraguay) Alessandro Massagrande	Opel Corsa GSi	Mechanical		0
Retired SS7		93	(Argentina) Orlando Silvi	(Argentina) Marcelo Alvarez	(Argentina) Orlando Silvi	Suzuki Swift GTi	Mechanical		0
Retired SS6		43	(Argentina) Esteban Goldenhersch	(Argentina) Jose Maria Rodriguez	(Argentina) Esteban Goldenhersch	Subaru Impreza WRX	Mechanical		0
Retired SS6		45	(Argentina) Marcelo Bugliotti	(Argentina) Guillermo Piazzano	(Argentina) Marcelo Bugliotti	Mitsubishi Lancer Evo VI	Mechanical		0
Retired SS6		55	(Brazil) Claudio Rossi	(Brazil) Thiago Maria	(Brazil) Claudio Rossi	Mitsubishi Lancer Evo V	Mechanical		0
Retired SS4		78	(Argentina) Juan Carlos Biondi	(Argentina) Sebastian Zuzino	(Argentina) Juan Carlos Biondi	Renault Clio Williams	Mechanical		0
Retired SS3		44	(Argentina) Orlando Cravero	(Argentina) Fernando Lorenzatto	(Argentina) Orlando Cravero	Subaru Impreza WRX	Accident		0
Retired SS3		49	(Argentina) Pablo Escuti	(Argentina) Pablo Nocelli	(Argentina) Pablo Escuti	Mitsubishi Lancer Evo IV	Accident		0

==== Special stages ====
Day	Stage	Stage name	Length	Winner	Car	Time	Class leaders
Leg 1 (11 May)	SS1	SSS Pro-Racing — Lane A	3.44 km	(Argentina) Gabriel Pozzo	Mitsubishi Lancer Evo VI	2:37.2	(Argentina) Gabriel Pozzo
Leg 1 (11 May)	SS2	SSS Pro-Racing — Lane B	3.44 km	(Argentina) Gabriel Pozzo	Mitsubishi Lancer Evo VI	2:35.8	(Argentina) Gabriel Pozzo
Leg 1 (12 May)	SS3	Capilla del Monte — San Marcos Sierra	23.02 km	(Uruguay) Gustavo Trelles	Mitsubishi Lancer Evo VI	18:27.6	(Austria) Manfred Stohl
Leg 1 (12 May)	SS4	San Marcos Sierra — Charbonier	9.61 km	(Argentina) Roberto Sanchez	Subaru Impreza WRX	7:13.2	(Austria) Manfred Stohl
Leg 1 (12 May)	SS5	Tanti — Cosquin	16.00 km	Stage cancelled			(Austria) Manfred Stohl
Leg 1 (12 May)	SS6	Villa Giardino — La Falda	22.53 km	(Argentina) Marcos Ligato	Mitsubishi Lancer Evo IV	17:35.5	(Uruguay) Gustavo Trelles
Leg 1 (12 May)	SS7	La Cumbre — Agua de Oro	23.46 km	(Uruguay) Gustavo Trelles	Mitsubishi Lancer Evo VI	21:43.8	(Uruguay) Gustavo Trelles
Leg 1 (12 May)	SS8	Colonia Caroya	3.40 km	(Uruguay) Gustavo Trelles	Mitsubishi Lancer Evo VI	2:34.0	(Uruguay) Gustavo Trelles
Leg 1 (12 May)	SS9	Ascochinga — La Cumbre	28.83 km	(Argentina) Gabriel Pozzo	Mitsubishi Lancer Evo VI	19:54.6	(Uruguay) Gustavo Trelles
Leg 2 (13 May)	SS10	Santa Rosa de Calamuchita — San Agustin 1	26.10 km	(Argentina) Gabriel Pozzo	Mitsubishi Lancer Evo VI	16:31.1	(Uruguay) Gustavo Trelles
Leg 2 (13 May)	SS11	San Agustin — Villa General Belgrano	12.46 km	(Argentina) Gabriel Pozzo	Mitsubishi Lancer Evo VI	10:31.1	(Argentina) Gabriel Pozzo
Leg 2 (13 May)	SS12	Amboy — Santa Rosa de Calamuchita 1	21.48 km	(Austria) Manfred Stohl	Mitsubishi Lancer Evo VI	12:26.0	(Argentina) Gabriel Pozzo
Leg 2 (13 May)	SS13	Santa Rosa de Calamuchita — San Agustin 2	26.10 km	(Uruguay) Gustavo Trelles	Mitsubishi Lancer Evo VI	16:35.2	(Argentina) Gabriel Pozzo
Leg 2 (13 May)	SS14	Las Bajadas — Villa del Dique	18.67 km	(Uruguay) Gustavo Trelles	Mitsubishi Lancer Evo VI	10:54.2	(Uruguay) Gustavo Trelles
Leg 2 (13 May)	SS15	Amboy — Santa Rosa de Calamuchita 2	21.48 km	(Argentina) Gabriel Pozzo	Mitsubishi Lancer Evo VI	12:21.4	(Argentina) Gabriel Pozzo
Leg 2 (13 May)	SS16	Camping General San Martin	5.05 km	(Argentina) Gabriel Pozzo	Mitsubishi Lancer Evo VI	4:34.0	(Argentina) Gabriel Pozzo
Leg 3 (14 May)	SS17	Chamico — Ambul	24.60 km	(Uruguay) Gustavo Trelles	Mitsubishi Lancer Evo VI	20:06.7	(Uruguay) Gustavo Trelles
Leg 3 (14 May)	SS18	El Mirador — San Lorenzo 1	20.65 km	(Argentina) Gabriel Pozzo	Mitsubishi Lancer Evo VI	13:19.9	(Uruguay) Gustavo Trelles
Leg 3 (14 May)	SS19	Cura Brochero — Nono	18.71 km	(Argentina) Gabriel Pozzo	Mitsubishi Lancer Evo VI	10:37.8	(Uruguay) Gustavo Trelles
Leg 3 (14 May)	SS20	La Posta — Mina Clavero	19.04 km	(Argentina) Gabriel Pozzo	Mitsubishi Lancer Evo VI	18:26.2	(Uruguay) Gustavo Trelles
Leg 3 (14 May)	SS21	El Mirador — San Lorenzo 2	20.65 km	(Argentina) Roberto Sanchez	Subaru Impreza WRX	13:31.0	(Uruguay) Gustavo Trelles
Leg 3 (14 May)	SS22	El Condor — Copina	16.77 km	(Argentina) Roberto Sanchez	Subaru Impreza WRX	17:40.7	(Uruguay) Gustavo Trelles

==== Championship standings ====
Pos.	Drivers' championships		
Pos.	Move	Driver	Points
1		(Austria) Manfred Stohl	27
2	2	(Uruguay) Gustavo Trelles	22
3	1	(Portugal) Miguel Campos	13
4	1	(Argentina) Claudio Marcelo Menzi	12
5		(Finland) Jani Paasonen	11
