= Juan Pablo Raies =

Argentine rally driver (born 1970)

Personal information
- Nationality: (Argentina) Argentinian
- Born: November 20, 1970 (age 56); Cordoba

World Rally Championship record
- Years active: 1992–1993, 1996, 1998, 2001–2002, 2005–2007
- Co-driver: (Argentina) Rodolfo Amelio Ortiz (Argentina) Raul Vargas (Argentina) Jorge Perez Companc
- Teams: Raies. Ford motorsport.
- Rallies: 200
- Championships: 2
- Rally wins: 16
- Podiums: 41
- Stage wins: 0
- Total points: 0
- First rally: 1992 Rally Argentina
- Last rally: 2007 Rally Argentina

Juan Pablo Raies is an Argentine rally race car driver.

Raies made his World Rally Championship debut on his home event in 1992, aboard a Renault 18 GTX. He returned to participate in the same event intermittently over the course of the following decade, which culminated in tenth and eighth-placed finishes respectively in the Group N production car-based category on the 2001 and 2002 running of these events, both with the then dominant choice in the formula, of the Mitsubishi Lancer Evolution. He piloted a World Rally Car for the first time, in his instance a Subaru Impreza, in the 2005 Rally Argentina. In the same year, he became South American Rally Champion.

Raies was given a one-off chance with the Stobart VK M-Sport Ford team on the Cyprus Rally during the 2006 season, retiring on special stage five due to an electrical problem with his Ford Focus RS WRC.

Raies was a driver for Munchi's Ford World Rally Team in the 2007 World Rally Championship season, as team-mate to the more established Luís Pérez Companc, brother of Raies' co-driver, Jorge Pérez Companc. Raies was excluded on his first outing with the team on the Rally Sweden, although he did still manage to achieve two twelfth-placed finishes later in the year, on the Rally Norway and Argentine events.

Sporting positions
Preceded by Ramón Ferreyros	South American Rally Champion; 2005	Succeeded by Roberto Sánchez
