= Claudiu David =

Romanian rally driver

Claudiu David is a former Romanian rally driver. He has a degree in executive coaching and currently works as a mentor. He also has experience with Olympic athletes at the National Institute of Sport Research.

== Career ==
=== Romanian Rally Championship ===
David was born on 7 December 1978, in Sinaia, a town and ski resort in Romania. He became a multiple-class champion in the Romanian rally championship. He drove his first four-wheel drive season in 2006 and finished runner-up by only one championship point. In 2008, he had to retire prematurely from the national championship due to the lack of sponsors. Of the five rallies he raced in, he had scored one victory and two second places.

=== World Rally Championship ===
In 2006, David was selected to drive in Rally Australia, but could not attend the event due to a Romanian Racing Federations conflict that left him without an international license. The following year, he was selected to race three rounds of the 2007 World Rally Championship (WRC) in the P-WRC category: Rally Argentina, Rally Japan and Rally GB. In 2007, for the three rounds of the WRC, the car was a Group N Mitsubishi Lancer Evo IX prepared by the Stohl Racing team from Austria and entered the OMV Bixxol Rally Team program for the promotion of young talents from Eastern Europe. At the end of the year, his main sponsor, the OMV Group, retired from motorsports, which left David without financial support.

=== Circuit racing ===
In 2007, David competed in circuit racing in the first ever FIA-GT race organized in the streets of Bucharest. He won the manufacturer's Dodge cup. He drove a GT3 Dodge Viper Competition Coupe of 510 bhp (380 kW) and finished 8th overall in the GT3 category.

=== Hungarian Rally Championship ===
On 1 August 2009, David obtained a group N win on his first appearance in the Hungarian Rally Championship at the 42nd Allianz Rallye at Pecs (tarmac). Driving the Mitsubishi Lancer Evo IX prepared by the local team Topp Cars, he won the gr N class by 0.9 seconds and was 4th overall.

=== American Rally Championship ===
On January 23–24, David contested his first official rally in the USRC (United States Rally Championship) in the Winter Rally New York. After two days of racing in icy conditions, he won his category (2WD – 2-wheel drive) and finished third overall.

=== BMW Driving Academy ===
In 2011, David became one of the five BMW "Train the Trainers" with the BMW Driving Academy in Maisach, Germany. He has coached passenger car training instructors and worked on the design and delivery of the BMW Group Driving Experiences' training.

== Results ==
- 2010: USRC (United States Rally Championship). Round 1: New York Winter Rally (snow and ice) – winner of the 2-wheel-drive category (2WD), 3rd in the overall rally standings, behind two 4WD cars – Mazda 3 Turbo.
- 2009: two rallies in the Romanian Championship (Timișoara and Iasi); 1 Rallye in the Hungarian Championship: 42nd Allianz Rallye Pecs – winner of the gr N (4th overall) – Mitsubishi Lancer Evo IX.
- 2008: five rallies in the Romanian Championship, 1 win (Cluj – tarmac), 2 podiums (Brasov – tarmac, Sibiu – gravel) – Mitsubishi Lancer Evo IX.
- 2007: three rallies in the FIA World Rally Championship (Argentina, Japan, and Wales Rally GB), P-WRC category; one rally in the FIA European Championship (Waltviertel, Austria) – Mitsubishi Lancer Evo IX; one circuit race in FIA-GT3, Bucharest Challenge (Dodge Viper GT3).
- 2006: runner-up in the Romanian Rally Championship, at 1 point behind the first place, two wins (Piatra Neamt, Brasov – gravel) – Mitsubishi Lancer Evo VII, the first season on four-wheel-drive cars.
- 2004–2005: National Class Champion of the N 1.6 Trophy in the Romanian Championship (VW Polo); class winner (N2) at Waldviertel Rally, Austria in 2004, a round of the FIA European Championship.
- 2003: 3rd place in the group H of the Romanian Rally Championship (Renault 5 GT Turbo).
- 2001–2002: took part in selected rounds of the National Championship (group H), recording some podium finishes (Renault 5 GT Turbo and Opel Corsa GTI).
- 2000: vice-champion of the rookie challenge in the Romanian Rally Championship (Opel Corsa GTI).
- 1996–1997: Rallycross – (Opel Rekord).

=== WRC results ===
Year	Entrant	Car	1	2	3	4	5	6	7	8	9	10	11	12	13	14	15	16	Pos.	Points
2004	OMV Bixxol Rally Team	Mitsubishi Lancer Evo IX	MON	SWE	NOR	MEX	POR	ARG; 32	ITA	GRE	FIN	GER	NZL	ESP	FRA	JPN; 30	IRE	GBR; Ret	NC	0
