= 2007 World Rally Championship =

35th season in the FIA World Rally Championship

Champions
- World Drivers' Champion: Sébastien Loeb
- World Manufacturers' Champion: Ford

Seasons
- ← 2006 2008 →

The 2007 World Rally Championship was the 35th season in the FIA World Rally Championship. The season began on 19 January, with the Monte Carlo Rally and ended on 2 December, with the Wales Rally GB. Citroën's Sébastien Loeb won his fourth consecutive drivers' world championship ahead of Ford's Marcus Grönholm and Mikko Hirvonen. Ford took the manufacturers' title.

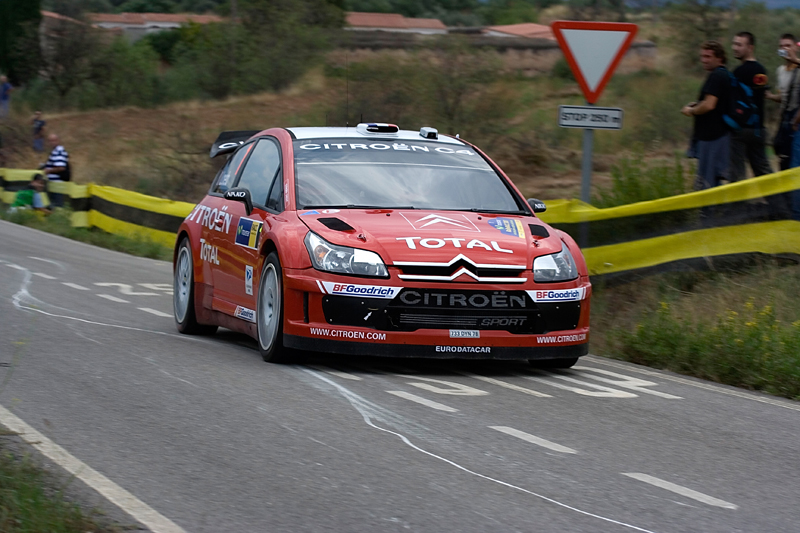
Sébastien Loeb secured his fourth WRC driver's championship at the wheel of a Citroën C4 WRC.

== Regulation changes ==
Remote service was introduced. Between two sets of stages, instead of returning to the main service location, cars are serviced in a remote location. The service duration is 15 minutes, only four mechanics are allowed and the only parts which can be changed (save for tires) are the ones carried in the car itself.

Since 2006 manufacturer is understood to mean a manufacturer, a team designated by a manufacturer, or a privateer team taking part with a single make of car. In 2007 two categories were created to compete for the Manufacturer's championship, replacing the previous M1 and M2 categories:

Manufacturer (M)

- undertakes to take part in all the rallies of the Championship
- must enter only cars corresponding to the latest homologated version of a World Rally Car in conformity with the 2007 Appendix J
- must inform the FIA of the name of the first driver entered for the season at the time of registration for the Championship. No change of the first driver is authorised, except in a case of force majeure. The driver of the second car may be changed for each of the rallies in the Championship
- In order to score points in the Championship, a Manufacturer must take part with two cars of the same make in all the rallies of the calendar

Manufacturer Team (MT)

- undertakes to take part in 10 or more Championship rallies which it has nominated
- cannot enter World Rally Cars homologated during the year 2007 and cannot use parts homologated after 2 January 2007
- In order to score points in the Championship, a Manufacturer Team must take part with two cars of the same make in 10 or more rallies it nominated on registering for the Championship. The Manufacturer Team can only score points in the events it nominated on registering

== Calendar ==
The 2007 championship was contested over sixteen rounds in Europe, Asia, the Americas and Oceania.

Rd.	Start date	Finish date	Rally	Rally headquarters	Surface	Stages	Distance	Support class
1	18 January	21 January	(Monaco) 75th Rallye Automobile Monte-Carlo	Valence, Drôme, France	Mixed	15	328.54 km	None
2	9 February	11 February	(Sweden) 56th Uddeholm Swedish Rally	Karlstad, Värmland County	Snow	20	342.09 km	PWRC
3	16 February	18 February	22nd Rally Norway	Hamar, Innlandet	Snow	18	355.99 km	JWRC
4	9 March	11 March	4th Corona Rally Mexico	León, Guanajuato	Gravel	20	366.06 km	PWRC
5	30 March	1 April	41st Vodafone Rally de Portugal	Faro, Faro District	Gravel	18	357.10 km	JWRC
6	4 May	6 May	27th Rally Argentina	Carlos Paz, Córdoba	Gravel	23	371.00 km	PWRC
7	18 May	20 May	(Italy) 4th Rally d'Italia Sardinia	Olbia, Sardinia	Gravel	18	342.86 km	JWRC
8	1 June	3 June	54th BP Ultimate Acropolis Rally of Greece	Markopoulo Mesogaias, Attica	Gravel	23	356.36 km	PWRC
9	3 August	5 August	57th Neste Rally Finland	Jyväskylä, Central Finland	Gravel	23	360.34 km	JWRC
10	17 August	19 August	(Germany) 26th ADAC Rallye Deutschland	Trier, Rhineland-Palatinate	Tarmac	19	356.27 km	JWRC
11	31 August	2 September	38th Rally New Zealand	Hamilton, Waikato	Gravel	18	353.56 km	PWRC
12	5 October	7 October	(Spain) 43rd RallyRACC Catalunya - Costa Daurada	Salou, Catalonia	Tarmac	18	352.87 km	JWRC
13	12 October	14 October	51st Tour de Corse - Rallye de France	Ajaccio, Corsica	Tarmac	16	359.32 km	JWRC
14	26 October	28 October	7th Rally Japan	Obihiro, Hokkaido	Gravel	27	350.19 km	PWRC
15	16 November	18 November	(Republic of Ireland) 3rd Rally Ireland	Sligo, County Sligo	Tarmac	20	328.72 km	PWRC
16	30 November	2 December	(United Kingdom) 63rd Wales Rally GB	Cardiff, Wales	Gravel	17	359.54 km	PWRC

== Teams and drivers ==
World Rally Car entries eligible to score manufacturer points
Manufacturer	Car	Team	Tyre	No	Drivers	Co-drivers	Rounds
Citroën	C4 WRC	(France) Citroën Total World Rally Team	BF	1	(France) Sébastien Loeb	(Monaco) Daniel Elena	All
Citroën	C4 WRC	(France) Citroën Total World Rally Team	BF	2	(Spain) Daniel Sordo	(Spain) Marc Marti	All
Ford	Focus RS WRC 06 1-8; Focus RS WRC 07 9-16	(United Kingdom) BP Ford World Rally Team	BF	3	(Finland) Marcus Grönholm	(Finland) Timo Rautiainen	All
Ford	Focus RS WRC 06 1-8; Focus RS WRC 07 9-16	(United Kingdom) BP Ford World Rally Team	BF	4	(Finland) Mikko Hirvonen	(Finland) Jarmo Lehtinen	All
Subaru	Impreza WRC2006 1-3; Impreza WRC2007 4-16	(Japan) Subaru World Rally Team	BF	7	(Norway) Petter Solberg	(United Kingdom) Phil Mills	All
Subaru	Impreza WRC2006 1-3; Impreza WRC2007 4-16	(Japan) Subaru World Rally Team	BF	8	(Australia) Chris Atkinson	(Australia) Glenn MacNeall	1–5
Subaru	Impreza WRC2006 1-3; Impreza WRC2007 4-16	(Japan) Subaru World Rally Team	BF	8	(Australia) Chris Atkinson	(Belgium) Stéphane Prévot	6–16
World Rally Car entries eligible to score manufacturer team points
Citroën	Xsara WRC	(Belgium) OMV Kronos Citroën World Rally Team	BF	5	(Austria) Manfred Stohl	(Austria) Ilka Minor	All
Citroën	Xsara WRC	(Belgium) OMV Kronos Citroën World Rally Team	BF	6	(Sweden) Daniel Carlsson	(France) Denis Giraudet	2–3, 5, 7
Citroën	Xsara WRC	(Belgium) OMV Kronos Citroën World Rally Team	BF	6	(Belgium) François Duval	(France) Patrick Pivato	10, 12–13
Ford	Focus RS WRC 06	(United Kingdom) Stobart VK M-Sport Ford Rally Team	BF	9	(Finland) Jari-Matti Latvala	(Finland) Miikka Anttila	All
Ford	Focus RS WRC 06	(United Kingdom) Stobart VK M-Sport Ford Rally Team	BF	10	(Norway) Henning Solberg	(Norway) Cato Menkerud	All
Ford	Focus RS WRC 06	(Argentina) Munchi's Ford World Rally Team	BF	11	(Argentina) Luis Pérez Companc	(Argentina) Jose Maria Volta	2, 4–9, 11–12, 14, 16
Ford	Focus RS WRC 06	(Argentina) Munchi's Ford World Rally Team	BF	12	(Argentina) Juan Pablo Raies	(Argentina) Jorge Pérez Companc	2, 4–6
Ford	Focus RS WRC 06	(Argentina) Munchi's Ford World Rally Team	BF	12	(Argentina) Federico Villagra	(Argentina) Jorge Pérez Companc	7–9, 11–12, 14, 16

World Rally Car entries ineligible to score manufacturer points
Manufacturer	Car	Team	Tyre	Drivers	Co-drivers	Rounds
Citroën	Xsara WRC	(Italy) Aimont Racing Team	P	(Italy) Gianluigi Galli	(Italy) Giovanni Bernacchini	2-3, 5
Citroën	Xsara WRC	(Italy) Astra Racing	BF	(Finland) Toni Gardemeister	(Finland) Jakke Honkanen	10
Citroën	Xsara WRC	(Zimbabwe) Conrad Rautenbach	BF	(Zimbabwe) Conrad Rautenbach	(United Kingdom) David Senior	16
Ford	Focus RS WRC 06	(United Kingdom) BP Ford World Rally Team	BF	(United Arab Emirates) Khalid Al Qassimi	(United Kingdom) Nicky Beech	9–10, 12, 15
Ford	Focus RS WRC 06	(United Kingdom) Stobart VK M-Sport Ford Rally Team	BF	(United Kingdom) Matthew Wilson	(United Kingdom) Michael Orr	All
Ford	Focus RS WRC 06	(United Kingdom) Stobart VK M-Sport Ford Rally Team	BF	(Italy) Alessandro Bettega	(Italy) Simone Scattolin	13
Ford	Focus RS WRC 04	(United Kingdom) Stobart VK M-Sport Ford Rally Team	BF	(Norway) Andreas Mikkelsen	(Norway) Ola Fløene	3, 5
Ford	Focus RS WRC 04	(United Kingdom) Stobart VK M-Sport Ford Rally Team	BF	(United Kingdom) Gareth Jones	(Republic of Ireland) James O'Brien	9
Ford	Focus RS WRC 04	(United Kingdom) Stobart VK M-Sport Ford Rally Team	BF	(United Kingdom) Gareth Jones	(Republic of Ireland) David Moynihan	12, 15–16
Ford	Focus RS WRC 04	(United Kingdom) Stobart VK M-Sport Ford Rally Team	BF	(Republic of Ireland) Ray Breen	(Republic of Ireland) Andrew Purcell	15
Ford	Focus RS WRC 04	(Norway) Thomas Schie	BF	(Norway) Thomas Schie	(Sweden) Göran Bergsten	2–3, 10, 12
Ford	Focus RS WRC 04	(United Kingdom) Ramsport	BF	(United Kingdom) Guy Wilks	(United Kingdom) Phil Pugh	3, 5, 8–10
Ford	Focus RS WRC 04	(United Kingdom) Ramsport	BF	(Norway) Andreas Mikkelsen	(Norway) Ola Fløene	9–10, 12–13, 15
Ford	Focus RS WRC 06	(United Kingdom) Ramsport	BF	(Norway) Andreas Mikkelsen	(Norway) Ola Fløene	16
Ford	Focus RS WRC 06	(Netherlands) Van Merksteijn Motorsport	BF	(Netherlands) Peter van Merksteijn Sr.	(Netherlands) Erwin Berkhof	10, 12
Ford	Focus RS WRC 06	(Netherlands) Van Merksteijn Motorsport	BF	(Netherlands) Peter van Merksteijn Sr.	(Netherlands) Hilco Van Beek	16
Ford	Focus RS WRC 06	(Republic of Ireland) MacHale Racing	BF	(Republic of Ireland) Gareth MacHale	(Republic of Ireland) Paul Nagle	3–5
Ford	Focus RS WRC 03	(Republic of Ireland) MacHale Racing	BF	(Republic of Ireland) Gareth MacHale	(Republic of Ireland) Paul Nagle	1
Ford	Focus RS WRC 03	(Republic of Ireland) MacHale Racing	BF	(Republic of Ireland) Gareth MacHale	(United Kingdom) Allan Harryman	15
Ford	Focus RS WRC 03	(Republic of Ireland) MacHale Racing	BF	(Republic of Ireland) Eamonn Boland	(Republic of Ireland) Francis Regan	1
Ford	Focus RS WRC 03	(Republic of Ireland) MacHale Racing	BF	(Republic of Ireland) Austin MacHale	(Republic of Ireland) Brian Murphy	4, 15
Ford	Focus RS WRC 04	(Republic of Ireland) MacHale Racing	BF	(Republic of Ireland) Aaron MacHale	(Republic of Ireland) Killian Duffy	15
Ford	Focus RS WRC 04	(Republic of Ireland) Noel McCarrick	BF	(Republic of Ireland) Noel McCarrick	(Republic of Ireland) Damien Connolly	15
Ford	Focus RS WRC 04	(Republic of Ireland) Paddy White	BF	(Republic of Ireland) Paddy White	(United Kingdom) Graeme Stewart	15
Ford	Focus RS WRC 02	(Norway) Christian August Selmer	BF	(Norway) Christian August Selmer	(Norway) Nils-Henrik Holmen	3
Ford	Focus RS WRC 02	(Republic of Ireland) George Tracey	BF	(Republic of Ireland) George Tracey	(Republic of Ireland) Jane O'Connor	15
Ford	Focus RS WRC 01	(Sweden) Mats Jonsson	BF	(Sweden) Mats Jonsson	(Sweden) Johnny Johansson	2
Ford	Focus RS WRC 00	(Norway) Einar Staff Jr.	BF	(Norway) Einar Staff Jr.	(Norway) Kim Staff	3
Hyundai	Accent WRC3	(South Africa) Stephen Simpson	BF	(South Africa) Stephen Simpson	(United Kingdom) Patrick Walsh	16
Mitsubishi	Lancer WRC05	(United Kingdom) MMSP LTD	BF	(Finland) Toni Gardemeister	(Finland) Jakke Honkanen	1–3, 5, 7
Mitsubishi	Lancer WRC05	(United Kingdom) MMSP LTD	BF	(Spain) Xavier Pons	(Spain) Xavier Amigò	1–3
Mitsubishi	Lancer WRC05	(United Kingdom) MMSP LTD	BF	(Finland) Juho Hänninen	(Finland) Mikko Markkula	3, 7, 9
Mitsubishi	Lancer WRC05	(United Kingdom) MMSP LTD	BF	(Portugal) Armindo Araújo	(Portugal) Miguel Ramalho	5
Mitsubishi	Lancer WRC05	(United Kingdom) MMSP LTD	BF	(Estonia) Urmo Aava	(Estonia) Kuldar Sikk	8–9, 11
Mitsubishi	Lancer WRC05	(Finland) Blue Rose Team	BF	(Finland) Kristian Sohlberg	(Finland) Risto Pietiläinen	9
Mitsubishi	Lancer WRC05	(Finland) Blue Rose Team	BF	(Finland) Kaj Kuistila	(Finland) Kari Jokinen	9
Peugeot	307 WRC	(France) Bozian Racing	BF	(Switzerland) Philippe Roux	(Switzerland) Eric Jordan	1
Peugeot	307 WRC	(France) Bozian Racing	BF	(Norway) Anders Kjaer	(Norway) Trond Odegard	3
Peugeot	307 WRC	(France) Team Rallye Cuoq	BF	(France) Jean-Marie Cuoq	(France) David Marty	1
Peugeot	307 WRC	(Spain) Baporo Motorsport	BF	(Spain) Jordi Zurita	(Spain) Óscar Sánchez	12
Peugeot	307 WRC	(France) Armando Pereira	BF	(France) Armando Pereira	(France) Karine Gehin	13
Peugeot	307 WRC	(France) José Micheli	BF	(France) José Micheli	(France) Virginie Dejoye	13
Peugeot	206 WRC	(France) Frédéric Romeyer	BF	(France) Frédéric Romeyer	(France) Marie-Ange Lachand	1
Peugeot	206 WRC	(Norway) Tord Linnerud	BF	(Norway) Tord Linnerud	(Norway) Ragnar Engen	3
Peugeot	206 WRC	(Mexico) Ricardo Triviño	BF	(Mexico) Ricardo Triviño	(Spain) Borja Aguado	9
Peugeot	206 WRC	(France) Alain Vauthier	BF	(France) Alain Vauthier	(France) François Ravault	13
Peugeot	206 WRC	(France) Georges Guebey	BF	(France) Georges Guebey	(France) Nadège Passaquin	13
Škoda	Fabia WRC	(Czech Republic) Czech Rally Team Kopecký	BF	(Czech Republic) Jan Kopecký	(Czech Republic) Filip Schovánek	1–3, 5, 7–10, 12–13, 16
Škoda	Fabia WRC	(Belgium) First Motorsport Škoda	BF	(Belgium) François Duval	(France) Patrick Pivato	8
Škoda	Fabia WRC	(Belgium) First Motorsport Škoda	BF	(France) François Leandri	(France) Gilbert Luigi	13
Škoda	Fabia WRC	(Netherlands) Harry Kleinjan	BF	(Netherlands) Harry Kleinjan	(Netherlands) Bart Hissink	10, 16
Škoda	Fabia WRC	(Netherlands) Wevers Sport	BF	(Netherlands) Erik Wevers	(Netherlands) Jalmar van Weeren	10
Škoda	Fabia WRC	(Republic of Ireland) Eugene Donnelly	BF	(Republic of Ireland) Eugene Donnelly	(Finland) Harri Kaapro	15
Škoda	Octavia WRC	(Finland) Jukka Ketomäki	BF	(Finland) Jukka Ketomäki	(Finland) Kai Risberg	9
Škoda	Octavia WRC	(United Kingdom) Melis Charalambous	BF	(United Kingdom) Melis Charalambous	(United Kingdom) Mark Crisp	16
Subaru	Impreza WRC2007	(Japan) Subaru World Rally Team	BF	(Spain) Xavier Pons	(Spain) Xavier Amigò	9–16
Subaru	Impreza WRC2006	(Netherlands) Wevers Sport	BF	(Netherlands) René Kuipers	(Belgium) Erwin Mombaerts	10, 16
Subaru	Impreza WRC2006	(Netherlands) Mark van Eldik	BF	(Netherlands) Mark van Eldik	(Netherlands) Michel Groenewoud	10, 12, 16
Subaru	Impreza WRC2006	(Republic of Ireland) Eamonn Boland	BF	(Republic of Ireland) Eamonn Boland	(Republic of Ireland) Francis Regan	12, 15
Subaru	Impreza WRC2006	(United Kingdom) Kris Meeke	P	(United Kingdom) Kris Meeke	(Republic of Ireland) Paul Nagle	15
Subaru	Impreza WRC2005	(Norway) Adapta	BF	(Norway) Mads Østberg	(Norway) Ole Kristian Unnelud	2–3, 5, 7, 9, 16
Subaru	Impreza WRC2005	(Greece) Armodios Vovos	BF	(Greece) Armodios Vovos	(Greece) Loris Meletopoulos	8
Subaru	Impreza WRC2005	(United Kingdom) Guy Wilks	BF	(United Kingdom) Guy Wilks	(United Kingdom) Phil Pugh	15
Subaru	Impreza WRC2005	(Republic of Ireland) Andrew Nesbitt	BF	(Republic of Ireland) Andrew Nesbitt	(Republic of Ireland) James O'Brien	15
Subaru	Impreza WRC2005	(Republic of Ireland) Tim McNulty	BF	(Republic of Ireland) Tim McNulty	(Republic of Ireland) Eugene O'Donnell	15
Subaru	Impreza WRC2005	(Republic of Ireland) Kevin Barrett	BF	(Republic of Ireland) Kevin Barrett	(Republic of Ireland) Barry Goodman	15
Subaru	Impreza WRC2005	(Republic of Ireland) Sean Devine	BF	(Republic of Ireland) Sean Devine	(Republic of Ireland) Paul McLoughlin	15
Subaru	Impreza WRC2004	(Sweden) Rally Team Olsbergs	BF	(Sweden) Patrik Flodin	(Sweden) Maria Andersson	2
Subaru	Impreza WRC2004	(Norway) Anders Grøndal	BF	(Norway) Anders Grøndal	(Norway) Trond-Inge Ostbye	3
Subaru	Impreza WRC2003	(Norway) Rune Dalsjø	BF	(Norway) Rune Dalsjø	(Norway) Jens Olav Lovhoiden	3
Subaru	Impreza WRC2003	(United Kingdom) Emma McKinstry	BF	(United Kingdom) Emma McKinstry	(United Kingdom) Kenny Hull	15
Subaru	Impreza WRC2002	(United Kingdom) Darren Gass	BF	(United Kingdom) Darren Gass	(United Kingdom) Neil Shawks	15
Suzuki	SX4 WRC	(Japan) Suzuki World Rally Team	BF	(France) Nicolas Bernardi	(Belgium) Jean-Marc Fortin	13
Suzuki	SX4 WRC	(Japan) Suzuki World Rally Team	BF	(Finland) Sebastian Lindholm	(Finland) Tomi Tuominen	16

=== Team and driver changes ===
Citroën Total World Rally Team returned to the WRC in 2007 with their new C4. Sébastien Loeb and Daniel Sordo joined the team from Kronos who had been the de facto works Citroën team. Kronos would remain in the WRC as a Manufacturer team with Manfred Stohl returning to Kronos after driving for the Bozian run Peugeot team. Daniel Carlsson was signed to compete in six rallies in 2007, but after Rally Italy, Carlsson was banned from participating in the remainder of the season. François Duval was later signed to compete in the remaining four tarmac rallies.

MMSP, formerly Ralliart, announced via the WRC website that Mitsubishi would be returning to the WRC in 2007, with Toni Gardemeister and Khalid Al Qassimi as their drivers. However, Mitsubishi of Japan refused to approve of the entry, preventing MMSP from entering as a manufacturer. Khalid Al Qassimi and his main sponsor Abu Dhabi withdrew from the team and would later join Ford with Al Qassimi driving a third car for the remainder of the season.

Argentinian ice cream parlor chain, Munchi's, would set up Ford's third manufacturer team in the WRC. Their drivers were Luis Pérez Companc, who had driven for Stobart Ford the previous year, and Juan Pablo Raies although the latter would be replaced by Federico Villagra.

Subaru dropped tarmac specialist Stéphane Sarrazin from their line-up with Chris Atkinson now having a full time seat with Subaru. Midway through the season, Subaru signed Xavier Pons to drive a third car for the remainder of the 2007 season. Prodrive had considered running a secondary manufacturer team for 2007, similar to Citroën and Ford, but this failed to materialize.

OMV Peugeot Norway World Rally Team and Red Bull Škoda Team left the WRC after the 2006 season.

=== P-WRC Entries ===
Team	Manufacturer	Car	No	Drivers	Co-drivers	Rounds
(Japan) Subaru Team Arai	Subaru	Impreza WRX STI	31	(Japan) Toshihiro Arai	(New Zealand) Tony Sircombe	2, 4, 6, 8, 11, 14
(United Kingdom) Stuart Jones Rallying	Mitsubishi	Lancer Evo IX	32	(United Kingdom) Stuart Jones	(United Kingdom) Craig Parry	4, 6, 8, 11
(United Kingdom) Stuart Jones Rallying	Mitsubishi	Lancer Evo IX	32	(United Kingdom) Stuart Jones	(United Kingdom) Andrew Bull	15
(United Kingdom) Stuart Jones Rallying	MG	MG S2000 Sport	32	(United Kingdom) Stuart Jones	(United Kingdom) Andrew Bull	16
(Italy) Motoring Club	Subaru	Impreza WRX STI	33	(San Marino) Loris Baldacci	(Italy) Rudy Pollet	2, 16
(Italy) Motoring Club	Subaru	Impreza WRX STI	33	(San Marino) Loris Baldacci	(San Marino) Silvio Stefanelli	4, 6, 8, 11
(Italy) Motoring Club	Subaru	Impreza WRX STI	45	(San Marino) Mirco Baldacci	(Italy) Giovanni Agnese	2, 4, 6, 8, 11, 16
(Italy) Motoring Club	Mitsubishi	Lancer Evo IX	44	(Italy) Fabio Frisiero	(Italy) Simone Scattolin	2, 6, 8, 11
(Italy) Motoring Club	Mitsubishi	Lancer Evo IX	44	(Italy) Mauro Rongoni	(Italy) Simone Scattolin	4
(Italy) Motoring Club	Mitsubishi	Lancer Evo IX	44	(Italy) Alessandro Bettega	(Italy) Simone Scattolin	16
(Italy) Top Run Racing	Mitsubishi	Lancer Evo IX	34	(United Kingdom) Mark Higgins	(United Kingdom) Scott Martin	2, 4, 8, 14–16
(Italy) Top Run Racing	Mitsubishi	Lancer Evo IX	51	(Estonia) Martin Rauam	(Estonia) Kristo Kraag	4, 6, 8, 11, 14, 16
(Japan) Advan-Piaa Rally Team	Mitsubishi	Lancer Evo IX	35	(Japan) Fumio Nutahara	(United Kingdom) Daniel Barritt	2, 4, 6, 11, 14–15
(Finland) RRE Sports	Mitsubishi	Lancer Evo IX	36	(Finland) Juho Hänninen	(Finland) Mikko Markkula	2, 6, 8, 11, 14, 16
(Japan) Syms Rally Team	Subaru	Impreza WRX STI	37	(Cyprus) Spyros Pavlides	(France) Denis Giraudet	4, 6, 8, 11, 14, 16
(Japan) Syms Rally Team	Subaru	Impreza WRX STI	38	(Finland) Kristian Sohlberg	(Finland) Risto Pietilainen	2, 4, 6, 8
(Japan) Syms Rally Team	Subaru	Impreza WRX STI	38	(New Zealand) Richard Mason	(New Zealand) Sara Mason	11
(Japan) Syms Rally Team	Subaru	Impreza WRX STI	38	(Japan) Yoshio Ikemachi	(Japan) Sadatoshi Andou	14
(Qatar) QMMF	Subaru	Impreza WRX STI	39	(Qatar) Nasser Al-Attiyah	(United Kingdom) Chris Patterson	2, 4, 6, 8, 11, 15
(Italy) Errani Team Group	Mitsubishi	Lancer Evo IX	40	(Italy) Riccardo Errani	(Italy) Stefano Casadio	2
(Italy) Errani Team Group	Mitsubishi	Lancer Evo IX	40	(Italy) Stefano Marrini	(Argentina) Nicolas Garcia	6
(Italy) Errani Team Group	Mitsubishi	Lancer Evo IX	40	(Italy) Stefano Marrini	(Italy) Tiziana Sandroni	14
(Italy) Errani Team Group	Mitsubishi	Lancer Evo IX	40	(Italy) Simone Campedelli	(Italy) Danilo Fappani	8, 15
(Italy) Errani Team Group	Fiat	Abarth Grande Punto S2000	40	(Poland) Michał Sołowow	(Poland) Maciek Baran	16
Subaru Poland Rally Team	Subaru	Impreza WRX STI	41	(Poland) Leszek Kuzaj	(Poland) Jarosław Baran	4, 6, 8, 14–16
Subaru Rally Team Russia	Subaru	Impreza WRX STI	42	(Russia) Alexander Dorosinskiy	(Russia) Dmitriy Yeremeyev	2, 4, 6
Subaru Rally Team Russia	Subaru	Impreza WRX STI	42	(Russia) Evgeny Vertunov	(Russia) Georgiy Troshkin	8, 11, 16
(Austria) OMV Bixxol Rally Team	Mitsubishi	Lancer Evo IX	43	(Hungary) Balazs Benik	(Hungary) Laszlo Bunkoczi	4
(Austria) OMV Bixxol Rally Team	Mitsubishi	Lancer Evo IX	43	(Slovenia) Andrej Jereb	(Slovenia) Miran Kacin	8, 11
(Austria) OMV Bixxol Rally Team	Mitsubishi	Lancer Evo IX	43	(Romania) Claudiu David	(Romania) Mihaela Beldie	14, 16
(Austria) OMV Bixxol Rally Team	Mitsubishi	Lancer Evo IX	43	(Bulgaria) Jasen Popov	(Bulgaria) Dilian Popov	15
(Austria) OMV Bixxol Rally Team	Mitsubishi	Lancer Evo IX	49	(Czech Republic) Martin Prokop	(Czech Republic) Jan Tománek	2
(Austria) OMV Bixxol Rally Team	Mitsubishi	Lancer Evo IX	49	(Czech Republic) Štěpán Vojtěch	(Czech Republic) Michal Ernst	4, 6, 11, 15–16
Mitsubishi Motors de Portugal	Mitsubishi	Lancer Evo IX	46	(Portugal) Armindo Araújo	(Portugal) Miguel Ramalho	2, 8, 11, 14–16
(Austria) Red Bull Rallye Team	Mitsubishi	Lancer Evo IX	47	(Austria) Andreas Aigner	(Germany) Klaus Wicha	2, 4, 6, 8, 15–16
Team Jordan	Subaru	Impreza WRX STI	48	(Jordan) Amjad Farrah	(United Kingdom) Steve Lancaster	6
Team Jordan	Mitsubishi	Lancer Evo IX	48	(Jordan) Amjad Farrah	(Italy) Nicola Arena	8, 11, 14
Team Jordan	Mitsubishi	Lancer Evo IX	48	(United Kingdom) Phillip Morrow	(United Kingdom) David Senior	15
Team Jordan	Mitsubishi	Lancer Evo IX	48	(New Zealand) Hayden Paddon	(New Zealand) John Kennard	16
(Sweden) Rally Team Olsbergs	Subaru	Impreza WRX STI	50	(Sweden) Patrik Flodin	(Sweden) Maria Andersson	6, 8, 11, 14–16
(Japan) Subaru Rally Team International	Subaru	Impreza WRX STI	52	(United States) Travis Pastrana	(United States) Bjorn Edstrom	4, 6, 16
(Japan) Subaru Rally Team International	Subaru	Impreza WRX STI	52	(Japan) Takuma Kamada	(Japan) Naoki Kase	8, 11, 14
(United Kingdom) TaCK	Subaru	Impreza WRX STI	53	(Finland) Anton Alén	(Finland) Timo Alanne	2
(United Kingdom) TaCK	Subaru	Impreza WRX STI	53	(United Kingdom) Niall McShea	(United Kingdom) Gordon Noble	6, 11, 15
(United Kingdom) TaCK	Subaru	Impreza WRX STI	53	(Russia) Evgeny Vertunov	(Russia) Georgiy Troshkin	14
(United Kingdom) TaCK	Subaru	Impreza WRX STI	53	(United Kingdom) David Higgins	(United Kingdom) Ieuan Thomas	16
(Argentina) Tango Rally Team	Mitsubishi	Lancer Evo IX	54	(Argentina) Gabriel Pozzo	(Argentina) Daniel Stillo	6, 8, 11, 14–16
additional guest entries
(Sweden) Subaru Swedish Dealer Team	Subaru	Impreza WRX STI	59	(Sweden) Oscar Svedlund	(Sweden) Björn Nilsson	2
Peugeot Sport Sweden	Peugeot	207 S2000	60	(Sweden) Jimmy Joge	(Sweden) Mattias Andersson	2
(Mexico) Francisco Name	Mitsubishi	Lancer Evo VII	59	(Mexico) Francisco Name	(Mexico) Armando Zapata	4
(Mexico) Salgado Rally Team	Mitsubishi	Lancer Evo IX	60	(Mexico) Rodrigo Salgado	(Mexico) Diodoro Salgado	4
(Argentina) Tango Rally Team	Mitsubishi	Lancer Evo IX	59	(Argentina) Marcos Ligato	(Argentina) Rubén García	6
(Argentina) VRS Rally Team	Mitsubishi	Lancer Evo IX	60	(Argentina) Federico Villagra	(Argentina) Diego Curletto	6
(New Zealand) Paddon Direct Team Green	Mitsubishi	Lancer Evo VIII	59	(New Zealand) Hayden Paddon	(New Zealand) John Kennard	11
(New Zealand) Vantage Motorsport APL	Subaru	Impreza WRX STI	60	(New Zealand) Emma Gilmour	(Australia) Glenn MacNeall	11
(Republic of Ireland) Colm Murphy Rallying	Subaru	Impreza WRX STI	59	(Republic of Ireland) Colm Murphy	(Republic of Ireland) Ger Loughrey	15
(Republic of Ireland) Alan Ring Rally Team	Mitsubishi	Lancer Evo IX	60	(Republic of Ireland) Alan Ring	(Republic of Ireland) Adrian Deasy	15
(United Kingdom) Mitsubishi Motors UK	Mitsubishi	Lancer Evo IX	59	(United Kingdom) Guy Wilks	(United Kingdom) Phil Pugh	16
(United Kingdom) Mitsubishi Motors UK	Mitsubishi	Lancer Evo IX	60	(United Kingdom) Gwyndaf Evans	(United Kingdom) Huw Lewis	16

=== JWRC entries ===
Team	Manufacturer	Car	No	Drivers	Co-drivers	Rounds
(France) Renault Sport	Renault	Clio R3	31	(Sweden) Patrik Sandell	(Sweden) Emil Axelsson	3, 5, 7, 9–10, 12
(France) Renault Sport	Renault	Clio R3	48	(Finland) Kalle Pinomäki	(Finland) Tuomo Nikkola	3, 5, 7, 9–10, 12
(Japan) Suzuki Sport Europe	Suzuki	Swift S1600	32	(Estonia) Urmo Aava	(Estonia) Kuldar Sikk	3, 5, 7, 10, 12–13
(Japan) Suzuki Sport Europe	Suzuki	Swift S1600	36	(Estonia) Jaan Mölder	(Germany) Katrin Becker	3, 5, 7, 9–10
(Japan) Suzuki Sport Europe	Suzuki	Swift S1600	36	(Estonia) Jaan Mölder	(Belgium) Frédéric Miclotte	13
(Japan) Suzuki Sport Europe	Suzuki	Swift S1600	42	(Estonia) Aigar Pärs	(Estonia) Ken Järveoja	3, 5, 7, 9–10, 13
(Japan) Suzuki Sport Europe	Suzuki	Swift S1600	43	(Lithuania) Vilius Rožukas	(Lithuania) Audrius Šošas	3, 5, 7, 9
(Japan) Suzuki Sport Europe	Suzuki	Swift S1600	45	(Sweden) Per-Gunnar Andersson	(Sweden) Jonas Andersson	3, 5, 7, 12–13
(Japan) Suzuki Sport Europe	Suzuki	Swift S1600	45	(United Kingdom) James Wozencroft	(Sweden) Jonas Andersson	10
(France) PH Sport	Citroën	C2 S1600	33	(Zimbabwe) Conrad Rautenbach	(United Kingdom) David Senior	5, 7, 9–10, 12–13
(France) PH Sport	Citroën	C2 S1600	44	(France) Yoann Bonato	(France) Benjamin Boulloud	13
(France) PH Sport	Citroën	C2 R2	44	(France) Yoann Bonato	(France) Benjamin Boulloud	9–10, 12
(France) PH Sport	Citroën	C2 R2	44	(France) Dominique Rebout	(France) Isabelle Galmiche	5
(France) PH Sport	Citroën	C2 R2	44	(France) Bryan Bouffier	(France) Mathieu Baumel	7
(Slovakia) Tempus Styllex	Renault	Clio S1600	34	(Slovakia) Jozef Béreš	(Czech Republic) Petr Starý	5, 7, 9–10, 12–13
(Czech Republic) Jipocar Czech National Team	Citroën	C2 S1600	35	(Czech Republic) Martin Prokop	(Czech Republic) Jan Tománek	5, 7, 9–10, 12–13
(Germany) PRT Motorsport	Citroën	C2 S1600	37	(Germany) Aaron Burkart	(Germany) Timo Gottschalk	3
(Germany) PRT Motorsport	Citroën	C2 S1600	37	(Germany) Aaron Burkart	(Germany) Michael Kölbach	7, 9–10, 12–13
(Czech Republic) JM Engineering	Renault	Clio S1600	38	(Poland) Michał Kościuszko	(Poland) Maciek Szczepaniak	5, 7, 9–10, 12
(Czech Republic) JM Engineering	Suzuki	Swift S1600	38	(Poland) Michał Kościuszko	(Poland) Maciek Szczepaniak	13
(Italy) Power Car Team	Renault	Clio S1600	39	(Italy) Andrea Cortinovis	(Italy) Flavio Zanella	3, 5, 7, 9, 12–13
(Italy) Mirabella Mille Miglia	Citroën	C2 R2	40	(Italy) Stefano Benoni	(Italy) Enrico Cantoni	5, 7, 9–10, 12–13
(Spain) Auto Laca Competicion	Renault	Clio R3	41	(Spain) Manuel Rueda	(Spain) Borja Rozada	5, 7, 9–10
(Lithuania) Rožukas Rally Team	Citroën	C2 R2	43	(Lithuania) Vilius Rožukas	(Lithuania) Audrius Šošas	12–13
(Republic of Ireland) World Rally Team Ireland	Citroën	C2 R2	46	(Republic of Ireland) Shaun Gallagher	(United Kingdom) Clive Jenkins	3, 5, 7, 9–10, 12
(Italy) TRT srl	Ford	Fiesta S1600	47	(Italy) Alessandro Bettega	(Italy) Simone Scattolin	3, 5, 7
(Italy) TRT srl	Suzuki	Ignis S1600	47	(Italy) Alessandro Bettega	(Italy) Simone Scattolin	9
(Italy) TRT srl	Renault	Clio R3	47	(Italy) Alessandro Bettega	(Italy) Simone Scattolin	12
(Italy) TRT srl	Renault	Clio S1600	47	(Italy) Luca Griotti	(Italy) Massimiliano Bosi	10
(Serbia) Interspeed Racing Team	Renault	Clio R3	49	(Serbia) Miloš Komljenović	(Serbia) Aleksandar Jerermić	5, 7, 9–10, 12–13
(Luxembourg) JPS Junior Team Luxemburg	Citroën	C2 R2	50	(Luxembourg) Gilles Schammel	(Belgium) Renaud Jamoul	5, 7, 9–10, 12–13
(Belgium) Kronos Junior Team	Citroën	C2 R2	51	(Belgium) Raphaël Auquier	(Belgium) Cédric Pirotte	5, 7, 9–10, 12–13
Additional guest entries
(Norway) NAF Motorsport	Ford	Fiesta ST	59	(Norway) Trond Svenkerud	(Norway) Kay Odegard	3
Suzuki Finland	Suzuki	Swift S1600	59	(Finland) Tapio Suominen	(Finland) Jarno Ottman	9
(Finland) Valvoline Racing Team	Honda	Civic Type-R	60	(Finland) Jarkko Nikara	(Finland) Petri Nikara	9
(Spain) Auto Laca Competicion	Citroën	C2 S1600	59	(Spain) Yeray Lemes	(Spain) Rogelio Peñate	12
Equipe de France FFSA	Renault	Clio R3	59	(France) Arnaud Augoyard	(France) Xavier Panseri	13
Equipe de France FFSA	Renault	Clio R3	60	(France) Thomas Barral	(France) Steeve Rebroin	13

== Events ==
=== Results ===
Colour	Rally Surface
Gold	Gravel
Silver	Tarmac
Blue	Snow/Ice
Bronze	Mixed Surface

Round	Rally name	Podium finishers				Statistics			
Round	Rally name	Rank	Driver	Car	Time	Stages	Length	Starters	Finishers
1	(France) / (Monaco) Monte Carlo Rally (19–21 January) — Results and report	1	(France) Sébastien Loeb	Citroën C4 WRC	3:10:27.4	15	328.54 km	47	39
1	(France) / (Monaco) Monte Carlo Rally (19–21 January) — Results and report	2	(Spain) Daniel Sordo	Citroën C4 WRC	3:11:05.6	15	328.54 km	47	39
1	(France) / (Monaco) Monte Carlo Rally (19–21 January) — Results and report	3	(Finland) Marcus Grönholm	Ford Focus RS WRC 06	3:11:50.2	15	328.54 km	47	39
2	(Sweden) Swedish Rally (9–11 February) — Results and report	1	(Finland) Marcus Grönholm	Ford Focus RS WRC 06	3:08:40.7	20	342.09 km	58	43
2	(Sweden) Swedish Rally (9–11 February) — Results and report	2	(France) Sébastien Loeb	Citroën C4 WRC	3:09:34.5	20	342.09 km	58	43
2	(Sweden) Swedish Rally (9–11 February) — Results and report	3	(Finland) Mikko Hirvonen	Ford Focus RS WRC 06	3:10:22.2	20	342.09 km	58	43
3	Rally Norway (16–18 February) — Results and report	1	(Finland) Mikko Hirvonen	Ford Focus RS WRC 06	3:28:17.0	18	355.99 km	74	63
3	Rally Norway (16–18 February) — Results and report	2	(Finland) Marcus Grönholm	Ford Focus RS WRC 06	3:28:26.5	18	355.99 km	74	63
3	Rally Norway (16–18 February) — Results and report	3	(Norway) Henning Solberg	Ford Focus RS WRC 06	3:32:01.6	18	355.99 km	74	63
4	Rally Mexico (9–11 March) — Results and report	1	(France) Sébastien Loeb	Citroën C4 WRC	3:48:13.3	20	366.06 km	47	36
4	Rally Mexico (9–11 March) — Results and report	2	(Finland) Marcus Grönholm	Ford Focus RS WRC 06	3:49:09.1	20	366.06 km	47	36
4	Rally Mexico (9–11 March) — Results and report	3	(Finland) Mikko Hirvonen	Ford Focus RS WRC 06	3:49:41.0	20	366.06 km	47	36
5	Rallye de Portugal (30 March – 1 April) — Results and report	1	(France) Sébastien Loeb	Citroën C4 WRC	3:53:33.1	18	357.10 km	80	61
5	Rallye de Portugal (30 March – 1 April) — Results and report	2	(Norway) Petter Solberg	Subaru Impreza WRC2007	3:56:47.0	18	357.10 km	80	61
5	Rallye de Portugal (30 March – 1 April) — Results and report	3	(Spain) Daniel Sordo	Citroën C4 WRC	3:58:38.4	18	357.10 km	80	61
6	Rally Argentina (4–6 May) — Results and report	1	(France) Sébastien Loeb	Citroën C4 WRC	2:52:03.8	23	370.36 km	70	41
6	Rally Argentina (4–6 May) — Results and report	2	(Finland) Marcus Grönholm	Ford Focus RS WRC 06	2:52:40.5	23	370.36 km	70	41
6	Rally Argentina (4–6 May) — Results and report	3	(Finland) Mikko Hirvonen	Ford Focus RS WRC 06	2:54:19.0	23	370.36 km	70	41
7	(Italy) Rally d'Italia Sardegna (18–20 May) — Results and report	1	(Finland) Marcus Grönholm	Ford Focus RS WRC 06	3:48:42.0	18	342.86 km	82	67
7	(Italy) Rally d'Italia Sardegna (18–20 May) — Results and report	2	(Finland) Mikko Hirvonen	Ford Focus RS WRC 06	3:49:11.2	18	342.86 km	82	67
7	(Italy) Rally d'Italia Sardegna (18–20 May) — Results and report	3	(Spain) Daniel Sordo	Citroën C4 WRC	3:50:03.8	18	342.86 km	82	67
8	(Greece) Acropolis Rally (1–3 June) — Results and report	1	(Finland) Marcus Grönholm	Ford Focus RS WRC 06	3:49:22.6	21	334.44 km	64	49
8	(Greece) Acropolis Rally (1–3 June) — Results and report	2	(France) Sébastien Loeb	Citroën C4 WRC	3:50:01.2	21	334.44 km	64	49
8	(Greece) Acropolis Rally (1–3 June) — Results and report	3	(Norway) Petter Solberg	Subaru Impreza WRC2007	3:50:56.7	21	334.44 km	64	49
9	Rally Finland (3–5 August) — Results and report	1	(Finland) Marcus Grönholm	Ford Focus RS WRC 07	2:57:26.1	23	360.34 km	97	70
9	Rally Finland (3–5 August) — Results and report	2	(Finland) Mikko Hirvonen	Ford Focus RS WRC 07	2:57:50.3	23	360.34 km	97	70
9	Rally Finland (3–5 August) — Results and report	3	(France) Sébastien Loeb	Citroën C4 WRC	2:58:36.0	23	360.34 km	97	70
10	(Germany) Rallye Deutschland (17–19 August) — Results and report	1	(France) Sébastien Loeb	Citroën C4 WRC	3:27:27.5	19	356.27 km	102	88
10	(Germany) Rallye Deutschland (17–19 August) — Results and report	2	(Belgium) François Duval	Citroën Xsara WRC	3:27:47.8	19	356.27 km	102	88
10	(Germany) Rallye Deutschland (17–19 August) — Results and report	3	(Finland) Mikko Hirvonen	Ford Focus RS WRC 07	3:28:46.6	19	356.27 km	102	88
11	Rally New Zealand (31 August – 2 September) — Results and report	1	(Finland) Marcus Grönholm	Ford Focus RS WRC 07	3:52:53.9	18	353.56 km	68	59
11	Rally New Zealand (31 August – 2 September) — Results and report	2	(France) Sébastien Loeb	Citroën C4 WRC	3:52:54.2	18	353.56 km	68	59
11	Rally New Zealand (31 August – 2 September) — Results and report	3	(Finland) Mikko Hirvonen	Ford Focus RS WRC 07	3:54:36.7	18	353.56 km	68	59
12	(Spain) Rally Catalunya (5–7 October) — Results and report	1	(France) Sébastien Loeb	Citroën C4 WRC	3:22:50.5	18	352.87 km	81	65
12	(Spain) Rally Catalunya (5–7 October) — Results and report	2	(Spain) Daniel Sordo	Citroën C4 WRC	3:23:04.3	18	352.87 km	81	65
12	(Spain) Rally Catalunya (5–7 October) — Results and report	3	(Finland) Marcus Grönholm	Ford Focus RS WRC 07	3:23:30.3	18	352.87 km	81	65
13	(France) Tour de Corse (12–14 October) — Results and report	1	(France) Sébastien Loeb	Citroën C4 WRC	3:28:31.5	16	359.32 km	74	60
13	(France) Tour de Corse (12–14 October) — Results and report	2	(Finland) Marcus Grönholm	Ford Focus RS WRC 07	3:28:55.2	16	359.32 km	74	60
13	(France) Tour de Corse (12–14 October) — Results and report	3	(Spain) Daniel Sordo	Citroën C4 WRC	3:29:15.8	16	359.32 km	74	60
14	Rally Japan (26–28 October) — Results and report	1	(Finland) Mikko Hirvonen	Ford Focus RS WRC 07	3:23:57.6	27	350.19 km	85	72
14	Rally Japan (26–28 October) — Results and report	2	(Spain) Daniel Sordo	Citroën C4 WRC	3:24:35.0	27	350.19 km	85	72
14	Rally Japan (26–28 October) — Results and report	3	(Norway) Henning Solberg	Ford Focus RS WRC 06	3:28:31.3	27	350.19 km	85	72
15	(Republic of Ireland) / (United Kingdom) Rally Ireland (16–18 November) — Results and report	1	(France) Sébastien Loeb	Citroën C4 WRC	3:01:39.2	20	328.72 km	84	66
15	(Republic of Ireland) / (United Kingdom) Rally Ireland (16–18 November) — Results and report	2	(Spain) Daniel Sordo	Citroën C4 WRC	3:02:32.6	20	328.72 km	84	66
15	(Republic of Ireland) / (United Kingdom) Rally Ireland (16–18 November) — Results and report	3	(Finland) Jari-Matti Latvala	Ford Focus RS WRC 06	3:03:27.4	20	328.72 km	84	66
16	(United Kingdom) Wales Rally GB (30 November – 2 December) — Results and report	1	(Finland) Mikko Hirvonen	Ford Focus RS WRC 07	3:22:50.9	17	359.54 km	84	66
16	(United Kingdom) Wales Rally GB (30 November – 2 December) — Results and report	2	(Finland) Marcus Grönholm	Ford Focus RS WRC 07	3:23:06.1	17	359.54 km	84	66
16	(United Kingdom) Wales Rally GB (30 November – 2 December) — Results and report	3	(France) Sébastien Loeb	Citroën C4 WRC	3:24:23.9	17	359.54 km	84	66

=== Statistics ===
Rnd	Event	Dates	Surface	Stages	Length	Starters	Finishers	Winner	Avg. speed
1	(France) / (Monaco) Monte Carlo Rally	19–21 January	Tarmac/Ice	15	328.54 km	47	39	(France) S. Loeb	103.50 km/h
2	(Sweden) Swedish Rally	9–11 February	Snow	20	342.09 km	58	43	(Finland) M. Grönholm	108.79 km/h
3	Rally Norway	16–18 February	Snow	18	355.99 km	74	63	(Finland) M. Hirvonen	102.55 km/h
4	Rally Mexico	9–11 March	Gravel	20	366.06 km	47	36	(France) S. Loeb	96.24 km/h
5	Rally Portugal	30 March – 1 April	Gravel	18	357.10 km	80	61	(France) S. Loeb	91.74 km/h
6	Rally Argentina	3–6 May	Gravel	23	370.36 km	70	41	(France) S. Loeb	86.57 km/h
7	(Italy) Rally d'Italia Sardegna	18–20 May	Gravel	18	342.86 km	82	67	(Finland) M. Grönholm	89.95 km/h
8	(Greece) Acropolis Rally	31 May – 3 June	Gravel	21	334.44 km	64	49	(Finland) M. Grönholm	87.48 km/h
9	Rally Finland	2–5 August	Gravel	23	360.34 km	97	70	(Finland) M. Grönholm	121.85 km/h
10	(Germany) Rallye Deutschland	17–19 August	Tarmac	19	356.27 km	102	88	(France) S. Loeb	103.04 km/h
11	Rally New Zealand	31 August – 2 September	Gravel	18	353.56 km	68	59	(Finland) M. Grönholm	91.09 km/h
12	(Spain) Rally Catalunya	5–7 October	Tarmac	18	352.87 km	81	65	(France) S. Loeb	104.38 km/h
13	(France) Tour de Corse	12–14 October	Tarmac	16	359.32 km	74	60	(France) S. Loeb	98.18 km/h
14	Rally Japan	26–28 October	Gravel	27	350.19 km	85	72	(Finland) M. Hirvonen	103.02 km/h
15	(Republic of Ireland) / (United Kingdom) Rally Ireland	15–18 November	Tarmac	20	328.72 km	84	66	(France) S. Loeb	108.58 km/h
16	(United Kingdom) Wales Rally GB	30 November – 2 December	Gravel	17	359.54 km	108	86	(Finland) M. Hirvonen	106.35 km/h

== Season results summary ==
=== Drivers' championship ===
Pos.	Driver	MON (Monaco)	SWE (Sweden)	NOR (Norway)	MEX (Mexico)	POR (Portugal)	ARG (Argentina)	ITA (Italy)	GRC (Greece)	FIN (Finland)	GER (Germany)	NZL (New Zealand)	ESP (Spain)	FRA (France)	JPN (Japan)	IRL (Republic of Ireland)	GBR (United Kingdom)	Pts
1	(France) Sébastien Loeb	1	2	14	1	1	1	Ret	2	3	1	2	1	1	Ret	1	3	116
2	(Finland) Marcus Grönholm	3	1	2	2	4	2	1	1	1	4	1	3	2	Ret	Ret	2	112
3	(Finland) Mikko Hirvonen	5	3	1	3	5	3	2	4	2	3	3	4	13	1	4	1	99
4	(Spain) Daniel Sordo	2	12	25	4	3	6	3	24	Ret	Ret	6	2	3	2	2	5	65
5	(Norway) Petter Solberg	6	Ret	4	Ret	2	Ret	5	3	Ret	6	7	6	5	16	5	4	47
6	(Norway) Henning Solberg	14	4	3	9	11	5	4	5	5	13	9	10	9	3	16	15	34
7	(Australia) Chris Atkinson	4	8	19	5	Ret	7	10	6	4	15	4	8	6	Ret	42	7	31
8	(Finland) Jari-Matti Latvala	Ret	Ret	5	7	8	4	9	12	Ret	8	5	7	4	26	3	10	30
9	(Austria) Manfred Stohl	10	7	12	6	9	8	7	8	Ret	Ret	12	Ret	14	6	Ret	8	13
10	(Belgium) François Duval								Ret		2		5	Ret		DNS		12
11	(United Kingdom) Matthew Wilson	12	Ret	26	8	12	30	12	10	10	9	10	11	Ret	4	7	6	11
12	(Czech Republic) Jan Kopecký	8	10	8		22		Ret	7	Ret	5		Ret	7			12	10
13	(Finland) Toni Gardemeister	7	6	Ret		DSQ		6	DNS		7							10
14	(Sweden) Daniel Carlsson		5	7		6		Ret	DNS									9
15	(Italy) Gianluigi Galli		13	6		7	DNS	DNS										5
16	(Argentina) Luís Pérez Companc		15		19	DNS	28	Ret	11	11		23	Ret		5		Ret	4
17	(Spain) Xavier Pons	25	Ret	16	DNS					6	18	Ret	9	8	36	Ret	9	4
18	(United Kingdom) Guy Wilks			Ret		Ret			9	9	10					6	13	3
19	(Estonia) Urmo Aava			28		15		13	14	7	12	8	18	Ret	18			3
20	(Argentina) Federico Villagra						9	11	32	14		11	13		7		18	2
21	(Norway) Mads Østberg		9	37		Ret		Ret		8							11	1
22	(Republic of Ireland) Gareth MacHale	11			Ret	13		Ret								8		1
23	(Finland) Juho Hänninen		DSQ	17			11	8	Ret	Ret		19	23		24			1
24	(Japan) Katsuhiko Taguchi														8			1
Pos.	Driver	MON (Monaco)	SWE (Sweden)	NOR (Norway)	MEX (Mexico)	POR (Portugal)	ARG (Argentina)	ITA (Italy)	GRC (Greece)	FIN (Finland)	GER (Germany)	NZL (New Zealand)	ESP (Spain)	FRA (France)	JPN (Japan)	IRL (Republic of Ireland)	GBR (United Kingdom)	Pts

Key
Colour	Result
Gold	Winner
Silver	2nd place
Bronze	3rd place
Green	Points finish
Blue	Non-points finish
Blue	Non-classified finish (NC)
Purple	Did not finish (Ret)
Black	Excluded (EX)
Black	Disqualified (DSQ)
White	Did not start (DNS)
White	Cancelled (C)
Blank	Withdrew entry from the event (WD)

- Sébastien Loeb secured the drivers' championship title in Wales.

=== Manufacturers' championship ===
Pos.	Manufacturer	No.	MON (Monaco)	SWE (Sweden)	NOR (Norway)	MEX (Mexico)	POR (Portugal)	ARG (Argentina)	ITA (Italy)	GRE (Greece)	FIN (Finland)	GER (Germany)	NZL (New Zealand)	ESP (Spain)	FRA (France)	JPN (Japan)	IRL (Republic of Ireland)	GBR (United Kingdom)	Points
1	(United Kingdom) BP Ford World Rally Team	3	3	1	2	2	4	2	1	1	1	4	1	3	2	Ret	Ret	2	212
1	(United Kingdom) BP Ford World Rally Team	4	5	3	1	3	5	3	2	4	2	3	3	4	8	1	4	1	212
2	(France) Citroën Total World Rally Team	1	1	2	8	1	1	1	Ret	2	3	1	2	1	1	Ret	1	3	183
2	(France) Citroën Total World Rally Team	2	2	8	10	4	3	6	3	10	Ret	Ret	6	2	3	2	2	5	183
3	(Japan) Subaru World Rally Team	7	6	Ret	4	Ret	2	Ret	5	3	Ret	5	7	6	5	7	5	4	87
3	(Japan) Subaru World Rally Team	8	4	7	9	5	Ret	7	8	6	4	8	4	8	6	Ret	7	6	87
4	(United Kingdom) Stobart VK M-Sport Ford	9	Ret	Ret	5	7	7	4	7	9	Ret	6	5	7	4	8	3	8	81
4	(United Kingdom) Stobart VK M-Sport Ford	10	8	4	3	8	9	5	4	5	5	7	8	9	7	3	6	9	81
5	(Belgium) OMV Kronos	5	7	6	7	6	8	8	6	7	Ret	Ret	10	Ret	9	5	Ret	7	45
5	(Belgium) OMV Kronos	6		5	6		6		Ret			2		5	Ret				45
6	(Argentina) Munchi's Ford World Rally Team	11		9		10		10	Ret	8	6		11	Ret		4		Ret	14
6	(Argentina) Munchi's Ford World Rally Team	12		Ret		9		9	9	11	7		9	10		6		10	14
Pos.	Manufacturer	No.	MON (Monaco)	SWE (Sweden)	NOR (Norway)	MEX (Mexico)	POR (Portugal)	ARG (Argentina)	ITA (Italy)	GRE (Greece)	FIN (Finland)	GER (Germany)	NZL (New Zealand)	ESP (Spain)	FRA (France)	JPN (Japan)	IRL (Republic of Ireland)	GBR (United Kingdom)	Points

Key
Colour	Result
Gold	Winner
Silver	2nd place
Bronze	3rd place
Green	Points finish
Blue	Non-points finish
Blue	Non-classified finish (NC)
Purple	Did not finish (Ret)
Black	Excluded (EX)
Black	Disqualified (DSQ)
White	Did not start (DNS)
White	Cancelled (C)
Blank	Withdrew entry from the event (WD)

- Ford secured the manufacturers' championship in Ireland.

=== PWRC ===
Pos.	Driver	SWE (Sweden)	MEX (Mexico)	ARG (Argentina)	GRC (Greece)	NZL (New Zealand)	JPN (Japan)	IRL (Republic of Ireland)	GBR (United Kingdom)	Pts
1	(Japan) Toshihiro Arai	6	2	2	1	1	10			39
2	(Argentina) Gabriel Pozzo			4	7	4	1	2	Ret	30
3	(United Kingdom) Mark Higgins	Ret	1		4		5	Ret	3	25
4	(United Kingdom) Niall McShea			6		2		1		21
5	(Finland) Juho Hänninen	Ret		3	Ret	7	7		2	18
6	(San Marino) Mirco Baldacci	10	4	Ret	3	15			6	14
7	(Japan) Fumio Nutahara	5	7	Ret		5	Ret	6		13
8	(Finland) Kristian Sohlberg	3	3	Ret	Ret					12
9	(Qatar) Nasser Al-Attiyah	7	Ret	Ret	5			3		12
10	(Sweden) Oscar Svedlund	1								10
11	(Argentina) Federico Villagra			1						10
12	(United Kingdom) Guy Wilks								1	10
13	(Austria) Andreas Aigner	9	11	7	2				9	10
Pos.	Driver	SWE (Sweden)	MEX (Mexico)	ARG (Argentina)	GRC (Greece)	NZL (New Zealand)	JPN (Japan)	IRL (Republic of Ireland)	GBR (United Kingdom)	Pts

=== JWRC Drivers' championship ===
Pos.	Driver	NOR (Norway)	POR (Portugal)	ITA (Italy)	FIN (Finland)	GER (Germany)	ESP (Spain)	FRA (France)	Pts
1	(Sweden) Per-Gunnar Andersson	1	1	2			1	4	43
2	(Estonia) Urmo Aava	3	2	1		2	3	Ret	38
3	(Czech Republic) Martin Prokop		Ret	3	Ret	1	2	1	34
4	(Slovakia) Jozef Béreš jun.		3	6	Ret	5	4	2	26
5	(Estonia) Jaan Mölder jr.	4	4	5	13	6	6		20
6	(Sweden) Patrik Sandell	2	15	8	1	Ret	Ret		19
7	(Germany) Aaron Burkart	5		4	14	4	7	7	18
8	(Zimbabwe) Conrad Rautenbach		10	Ret	4	3	5	8	16
9	(France) Yoann Bonato				8	7	8	3	10
10	(Italy) Andrea Cortinovis	7	5	14	12		Ret	6	9
11	(Finland) Kalle Pinomäki	10	9	Ret	2	9	Ret		8
12	(Poland) Michal Kosciuszko		Ret	12	3	Ret	Ret	9	6
13	(Lithuania) Vilius Rožukas jun.	11	8	9	6		11	14	4
14	(Finland) Tapio Suominen				5				4
15	(France) Arnaud Augoyard							5	4
16	(Norway) Trond Svenkerud	6							3
17	(Spain) Manuel Rueda		6	Ret		12			3
18	(Republic of Ireland) Shaun Gallagher	8	7	10	11	10	10		3
19	(Italy) Alessandro Bettega	9	Ret	Ret	7		9		2
20	(France) Bryan Bouffier			7					2
21	(Estonia) Aigar Pärs	12	14	Ret	Ret	8		Ret	1
-	(Luxembourg) Gilles Schammel		16	11	Ret	14	12	Ret	0
-	(Serbia) Miloš Komljenović		12	13	Ret	17	13	12	0
Pos.	Driver	NOR (Norway)	POR (Portugal)	ITA (Italy)	FIN (Finland)	GER (Germany)	ESP (Spain)	FRA (France)	Pts

Key
Colour	Result
Gold	Winner
Silver	2nd place
Bronze	3rd place
Green	Points finish
Blue	Non-points finish
Blue	Non-classified finish (NC)
Purple	Did not finish (Ret)
Black	Excluded (EX)
Black	Disqualified (DSQ)
White	Did not start (DNS)
White	Cancelled (C)
Blank	Withdrew entry from the event (WD)
