= 2007 Rally Catalunya =

Rallying motorsport event

2007 Rally Catalunya 43º Rally RACC Catalunya - Costa Daurada
Round 12 of the 2007 World Rally Championship
← Previous event	Next event →
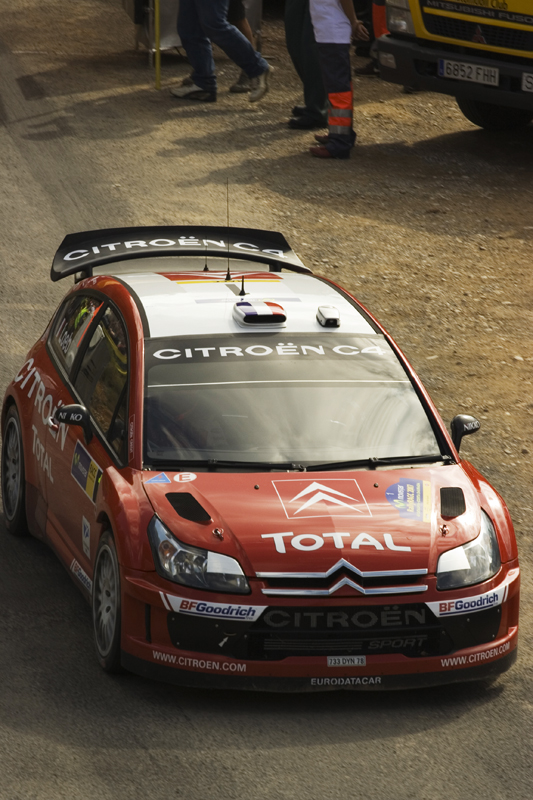
- Rally winner Sébastien Loeb.
- Rally base: Salou
- Dates run: October 5 – 7 2007
- Stages: 18 (352.87 km; 219.26 miles)
- Stage surface: Tarmac
- Overall distance: 1,359.96 km (845.04 miles)

Statistics
- Crews: 81 at start, 68 at finish

Overall results
- Overall winner: (France) Sébastien Loeb (France) Citroën Total World Rally Team; Citroën C4 WRC

Results of Rally Catalunya (43º Rally RACC Catalunya - Costa Daurada), 12th round of 2007 World Rally Championship, run on October 5–7.

== Results ==
Pos.	Driver	Co-driver	Car	Time	Difference	Points
WRC
1.	(France) Sébastien Loeb	(Monaco) Daniel Elena	Citroën C4 WRC	3:22:50.5	0.0	10
2.	(Spain) Daniel Sordo	(Spain) Marc Marti	Citroën C4 WRC	3:23:04.3	13.8	8
3.	(Finland) Marcus Grönholm	(Finland) Timo Rautiainen	Ford Focus RS WRC 07	3:28:46.6	39.8	6
4.	(Finland) Mikko Hirvonen	(Finland) Jarmo Lehtinen	Ford Focus RS WRC 07	3:23:30.3	1:25.8	5
5.	(Belgium) François Duval	(France) Patrick Pivato	Citroën Xsara WRC	3:24:16.3	2:28.7	4
6.	(Norway) Petter Solberg	(United Kingdom) Phil Mills	Subaru Impreza WRC07	3:25:19.2	2:54.1	3
7.	(Finland) Jari-Matti Latvala	(Finland) Ole Kristian Unnerud	Ford Focus RS WRC 06	3:25:44.6	3:38.2	2
8.	(Australia) Chris Atkinson	(Belgium) Stéphane Prévot	Subaru Impreza WRC07	3:26:28.7	4:22.4	1
JRC
1. (15.)	(Sweden) Per-Gunnar Andersson	(Sweden) Jonas Andersson	Suzuki Swift S1600	3:44:24.5	0.0	10
2. (17.)	(Czech Republic) Martin Prokop	(Czech Republic) Jan Tománek	Citroën C2 S1600	3:44:58.4	33.9	8
3. (18.)	(Estonia) Urmo Aava	(Estonia) Kuldar Sikk	Suzuki Swift S1600	3:45:04.4	39.9	6
4. (22.)	(Slovakia) Jozef Béreš jun.	(Czech Republic) Petr Starý	Renault Clio S1600	3:48:03.9	3:39.4	5
5. (24.)	(Zimbabwe) Conrad Rautenbach	(United Kingdom) David Senior	Citroën C2 S1600	3:49:24.3	4:59.8	4
6. (27.)	(Estonia) Jaan Mölder jr.	(Germany) Katrin Becker	Suzuki Swift S1600	3:53:24.0	8:59.5	3
7. (31.)	(Germany) Aaron Burkart	(Germany) Michael Kölbach	Citroën C2 S1600	3:55:04.1	10:39.6	2
8. (33.)	(France) Yoann Bonato	(France) Benjamin Boulloud	Citroën C2 R2	3:57:03.4	12:38.9	1

== Retirements ==
- (Italy) Andreas Cortinovis - went off the road (SS1);
- (Belgium) Raphael Auquier - went off the road (SS1);
- (Argentina) Luís Pérez Companc - went off the road (SS2);
- (Austria) Manfred Stohl - went off the road (SS3);
- (Czech Republic) Jan Kopecký - went off the road (SS3);
- (Sweden) Patrik Sandell - went off the road (SS6/7);
- (Finland) Kalle Pinomaki - went off the road (SS8);
- (Italy) Stefano Benoni - mechanical (SS8);
- (United Kingdom) Gareth Jones - mechanical (SS8);
- (Spain) Yeray Lemes - retired (SS14);
- (Poland) Michał Kościuszko - went off the road (SS15);

== Special Stages ==
All dates and times are CEST (UTC+2).

Leg	Stage	Time	Name	Length	Winner	Time	Avg. spd.	Rally leader
1 (October 5)	SS1	08:21	Querol 1	25.43 km	(Finland) M. Grönholm	13:57.1	109.4 km/h	(Finland) M. Grönholm
1 (October 5)	SS2	09:09	El Montmell 1	24.14 km	(France) S. Loeb	12:56.4	111.9 km/h	(France) S. Loeb
1 (October 5)	SS3	12:46	Querol 2	25.43 km	(Belgium) F. Duval	13:48.5	110.5 km/h	(France) S. Loeb
1 (October 5)	SS4	13:34	El Montmell 2	24.14 km	(Spain) D. Sordo	12:31.4	115.7 km/h	(Spain) D. Sordo
1 (October 5)	SS5	16:48	El Lloar - La Figuera	22.43 km	(Finland) M. Hirvonen	12:27.7	108.0 km/h	(Spain) D. Sordo
1 (October 5)	SS6	18:00	Pratdip	26.48 km	(France) S. Loeb	16:16.7	97.6 km/h	(France) S. Loeb
2 (October 6)	SS7	08:43	Villaplana 1	13.29 km	(Finland) M. Grönholm	7:54.4	100.9 km/h	(France) S. Loeb
2 (October 6)	SS8	09:37	Coll del Grau 1	26.33 km	(France) S. Loeb	13:59.5	112.9 km/h	(France) S. Loeb
2 (October 6)	SS9	10:16	Margalef - La Palma 1	15.85 km	(Finland) M. Grönholm	9:45.8	97.4 km/h	(France) S. Loeb
2 (October 6)	SS10	11:21	La Serra d'Almos 1	4.11 km	(Spain) D. Sordo	2:38.3	93.5 km/h	(France) S. Loeb
2 (October 6)	SS11	13:22	Villaplana 2	13.29 km	(Finland) M. Grönholm	7:44.1	103.1 km/h	(France) S. Loeb
2 (October 6)	SS12	14:16	Coll del Grau 2	26.33 km	(Spain) D. Sordo	13:59.0	113.0 km/h	(France) S. Loeb
2 (October 6)	SS13	14:55	Margalef - La Palma 2	15.85 km	(France) S. Loeb	9:38.8	98.6 km/h	(France) S. Loeb
2 (October 6)	SS14	16:00	La Serra d'Almos 2	4.11 km	(Finland) M. Grönholm	2:37.7	93.8 km/h	(France) S. Loeb
3 (October 7)	SS15	08:15	Riudecanyes 1	16.32 km	(Finland) M. Grönholm (France) S. Loeb	10:19.2	94.9 km/h	(France) S. Loeb
3 (October 7)	SS16	09:16	Colldejou 1	26.51 km	(Spain) D. Sordo	15:38.7	101.7 km/h	(France) S. Loeb
3 (October 7)	SS17	11:59	Riudecanyes 2	16.32 km	(Finland) M. Grönholm	10:15.1	95.5 km/h	(France) S. Loeb
3 (October 7)	SS18	13:00	Colldejou 2	26.51 km	(Finland) M. Grönholm	15:39.9	101.5 km/h	(France) S. Loeb

== Championship standings after the event ==
=== Drivers' championship ===
Pos	Driver	MON (Monaco)	SWE (Sweden)	NOR (Norway)	MEX (Mexico)	POR (Portugal)	ARG (Argentina)	ITA (Italy)	GRC (Greece)	FIN (Finland)	GER (Germany)	NZL (New Zealand)	ESP (Spain)	FRA (France)	JPN (Japan)	IRL (Republic of Ireland)	GBR (United Kingdom)	Pts
1	(Finland) Marcus Grönholm	3	1	2	2	4	2	1	1	1	4	1	3					96
2	(France) Sébastien Loeb	1	2	14	1	1	1	Ret	2	3	1	2	1					90
3	(Finland) Mikko Hirvonen	5	3	1	3	5	3	2	4	2	3	3	4					74
4	(Spain) Dani Sordo	2	12	25	4	3	6	3	24	Ret	Ret	6	2					39
5	(Norway) Petter Solberg	6	Ret	4	Ret	2	Ret	5	3	Ret	6	7	6					34
6	(Norway) Henning Solberg	14	4	3	9	9	5	4	5	5	14	9	10					28
7	(Australia) Chris Atkinson	4	8	19	5	Ret	7	10	6	4	15	4	8					26
8	(Finland) Jari-Matti Latvala	Ret	Ret	5	7	8	4	9	12	Ret	8	5	7					19
9	(Belgium) François Duval								Ret		2		5					12
10	(Finland) Toni Gardemeister	7	6	Ret		DSQ		6			7							10
11	(Sweden) Daniel Carlsson		5	7		6		Ret										9
11	(Austria) Manfred Stohl	10	7	12	6	10	8	7	8	Ret	Ret	12	Ret					9
13	(Czech Republic) Jan Kopecký	8	10	8		22		Ret	7	Ret	5		Ret					8
14	(Italy) Gigi Galli		13	6		7												5
15	(Spain) Xavier Pons	25	Ret	16						6	18	Ret	9					3
15	(Estonia) Urmo Aava			28		15		13	14	7	12	8	18					3
17	(United Kingdom) Matthew Wilson	12	Ret	26	8	12	30	12	10	10	9	10	11					1
17	(Finland) Juho Hänninen		DSQ	17			11	8	Ret	Ret		19	23					1
17	(Norway) Mads Østberg		9	37		Ret		Ret		8								1
Pos	Driver	MON (Monaco)	SWE (Sweden)	NOR (Norway)	MEX (Mexico)	POR (Portugal)	ARG (Argentina)	ITA (Italy)	GRC (Greece)	FIN (Finland)	GER (Germany)	NZL (New Zealand)	ESP (Spain)	FRA (France)	JPN (Japan)	IRL (Republic of Ireland)	GBR (United Kingdom)	Pts

Key
Colour	Result
Gold	Winner
Silver	2nd place
Bronze	3rd place
Green	Points finish
Blue	Non-points finish
Blue	Non-classified finish (NC)
Purple	Did not finish (Ret)
Black	Excluded (EX)
Black	Disqualified (DSQ)
White	Did not start (DNS)
White	Cancelled (C)
Blank	Withdrew entry from the event (WD)

=== Manufacturers' championship ===
Rank	Manufacturer	Event																Total points
Rank	Manufacturer	MON (Monaco)	SWE (Sweden)	NOR (Norway)	MEX (Mexico)	POR (Portugal)	ARG (Argentina)	ITA (Italy)	GRC (Greece)	FIN (Finland)	GER (Germany)	NZL (New Zealand)	ESP (Spain)	FRA (France)	JPN (Japan)	IRL (Republic of Ireland)	GBR (United Kingdom)	Total points
1	BP Ford World Rally Team	10	16	18	14	9	14	18	15	18	11	16	11	-	-	-	-	170
2	Citroën Total World Rally Team	18	9	1	15	16	13	6	8	6	10	11	18	-	-	-	-	131
3	Subaru World Rally Team	8	2	5	4	8	2	5	9	5	5	7	4	-	-	-	-	64
4	Stobart VK M-Sport Ford	1	5	10	3	2	9	7	4	4	5	5	2	-	-	-	-	57
5	OMV Kronos	2	7	5	3	4	1	3	2	0	8	0	4	-	-	-	-	39
6	Munchi's Ford World Rally Team		0		0		0	0	1	5		0	0	-	-	-	-	6
