= 2007 Tour de Corse =

Round in the 2007 world rally championship

2007 Tour de Corse 51ème Tour de Corse - Rallye de France
Round 13 of the 2007 World Rally Championship
← Previous event	Next event →
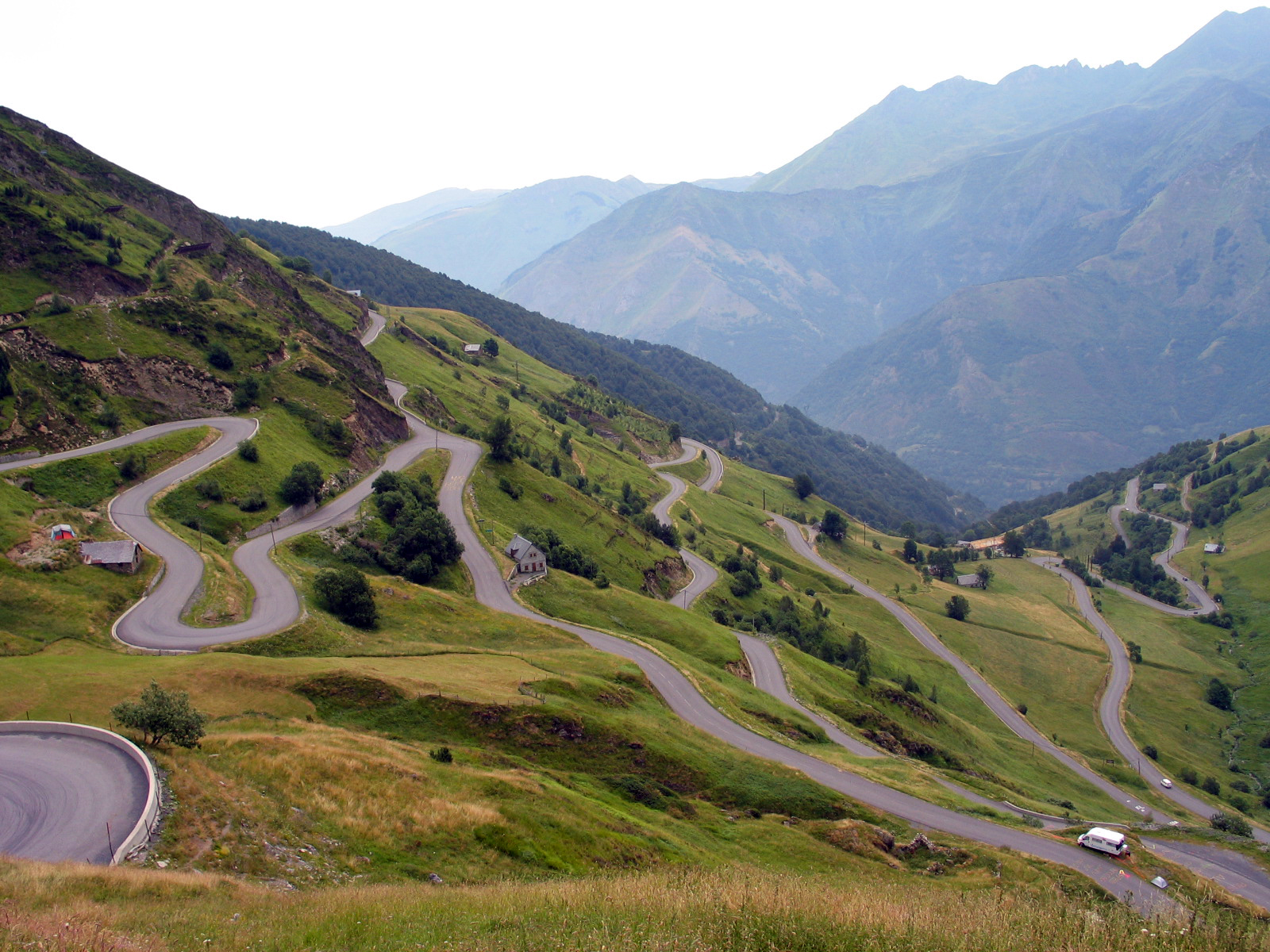
- Twisty French mountain pass
- Host country: France
- Rally base: Ajaccio, France
- Dates run: October 12 – 14 2007
- Stages: 16 (359.32 km; 223.27 miles)
- Stage surface: Tarmac
- Overall distance: 1,117.2 km (694.2 miles)

Statistics
- Crews: 74 at start, 57 at finish

Overall results
- Overall winner: (France) Sébastien Loeb (France) Citroën Total World Rally Team; Citroën C4 WRC

Results of Tour de Corse (51ème Tour de Corse - Rallye de France), 13th round of 2007 World Rally Championship, run on October 12–14. Citroën's Sébastien Loeb won the race, his 35th win in the World Rally Championship. The rally was the first for the Suzuki World Rally Team's to make its debut in the SX4 WRC car.

== Results ==
Pos.	Driver	Co-driver	Car	Time	Difference	Points
WRC
1.	(France) Sébastien Loeb	(Monaco) Daniel Elena	Citroën C4 WRC	3:28:31.5	0.0	10
2.	(Finland) Marcus Grönholm	(Finland) Timo Rautiainen	Ford Focus RS WRC 07	3:28:55.2	23.7	8
3.	(Spain) Daniel Sordo	(Spain) Marc Marti	Citroën C4 WRC	3:29:15.8	44.3	6
4.	(Finland) Jari-Matti Latvala	(Finland) Miikka Anttila	Ford Focus RS WRC 06	3:31:02.0	2:30.5	5
5.	(Norway) Petter Solberg	(Wales) Phil Mills	Subaru Impreza WRC07	3:31:13.6	2:42.1	4
6.	(Australia) Chris Atkinson	(Belgium) Stéphane Prévot	Subaru Impreza WRC07	3:32:25.3	3:53.8	3
7.	(Czech Republic) Jan Kopecký	(Czech Republic) Filip Schovánek	Škoda Fabia WRC	3:36:34.4	8:02.9	2
8.	(Spain) Xavier Pons	(Spain) Xavier Amigo	Subaru Impreza WRC	3:38:05.7	9:34.2	1
JRC
1. (17.)	(Czech Republic) Martin Prokop	(Czech Republic) Jan Tománek	Citroën C2 S1600	3:52:31.0	0.0	10
2. (18.)	(Slovakia) Jozef Béreš jun.	(Czech Republic) Petr Starý	Renault Clio S1600	3:52:43.5	12.5	8
3. (19.)	(France) Yoann Bonato	(France) Benjamin Boulloud	Citroën C2 R2	3:53:45.2	1:14.2	6
4. (20.)	(Sweden) Per-Gunnar Andersson	(Sweden) Jonas Andersson	Suzuki Swift S1600	3:54:49.0	2:18.0	5
5. (23.)	(France) Arnaud Augoyard	(France) Nicolas Baudin	Renault Clio R3	3:57:39.2	5:08.2	4
6. (24.)	(Italy) Andrea Cortinovis	(Italy) Flavio Zanella	Renault Clio S1600	3:58:44.0	6:13.0	3
7. (25.)	(Germany) Aaron Burkart	(Germany) Michael Kölbach	Citroën C2 S1600	3:58:44.1	6:13.1	2
8. (26.)	(Zimbabwe) Conrad Rautenbach	(United Kingdom) David Senior	Citroën C2 S1600	3:59:01.1	6:30.1	1

== Retirements ==
- (Estonia) Aigar Pärs - went off the road (OS6);
- (Luxembourg) Gilles Schammel - mechanical (OS6);
- (Estonia) Urmo Aava - went off the road (OS8);
- (Belgium) François Duval - mechanical (OS12);
- (Norway) Andreas Mikkelsen - excluded (OS12);
- (United Kingdom) Matthew Wilson - mechanical (OS15);

== Special Stages ==
All dates and times are CEST (UTC+2).

Leg	Stage	Time	Name	Length	Winner	Time	Avg. spd.	Rally leader
1 (12 Oct)	SS1	08:38	Monti Rossu - Pila Canale 1	18.10 km	CANCELLED	-	-	-
1 (12 Oct)	SS2	09:46	Belvedere - Bocca Albitrina 1	16.62 km	(Finland) M. Grönholm	9:14.8	107.8 km/h	(Finland) M. Grönholm
1 (12 Oct)	SS3	10:44	Arbellara - Aullene 1	27.42 km	(Finland) M. Grönholm	15:34.6	105.6 km/h	(Finland) M. Grönholm
1 (12 Oct)	SS4	14:02	Monti Rossu - Pila Canale 2	18.10 km	(France) S. Loeb	9:59.0	108.8 km/h	(Finland) M. Grönholm
1 (12 Oct)	SS5	15:10	Belvedere - Bocca Albitrina 2	16.62 km	(France) S. Loeb	9:12.1	108.4 km/h	(France) S. Loeb
1 (12 Oct)	SS6	16:08	Arbellara - Aullene 2	27.42 km	(France) S. Loeb	15:25.1	106.7 km/h	(France) S. Loeb
2 (13 Oct)	SS7	08:58	Carbuccia - Scalella 1	21.88 km	(France) S. Loeb	14:15.1	92.1 km/h	(France) S. Loeb
2 (13 Oct)	SS8	10:31	Calcatoggio - Plage du Liamone 1	26.55 km	(France) S. Loeb	17:47.3	89.6 km/h	(France) S. Loeb
2 (13 Oct)	SS9	11:29	Vico - Col St Roch 1	13.04 km	(France) S. Loeb	8:39.6	90.3 km/h	(France) S. Loeb
2 (13 Oct)	SS10	14:22	Carbuccia - Scalella 2	21.88 km	(Spain) D. Sordo	14:19.7	91.6 km/h	(France) S. Loeb
2 (13 Oct)	SS11	15:55	Calcatoggio - Plage du Liamone 2	26.55 km	(France) S. Loeb	17:48.3	89.5 km/h	(France) S. Loeb
2 (13 Oct)	SS12	16:53	Vico - Col St Roch 2	13.04 km	(France) S. Loeb	8:38.6	90.5 km/h	(France) S. Loeb
3 (14 Oct)	SS13	08:53	Penitencier Coti - Pietra Rossa 1	24.24 km	(France) S. Loeb	14:38.7	99.3 km/h	(France) S. Loeb
3 (14 Oct)	SS14	09:36	Pont de Calzola - Agosta 1	31.81 km	(Spain) D. Sordo	18:54.6	100.9 km/h	(France) S. Loeb
3 (14 Oct)	SS15	12:19	Penitencier Coti - Pietra Rossa 2	24.24 km	(Spain) D. Sordo	14:40.5	99.1 km/h	(France) S. Loeb
3 (14 Oct)	SS16	13:02	Pont de Calzola - Agosta 2	31.81 km	(Spain) D. Sordo	18:56.0	100.8 km/h	(France) S. Loeb

== Championship standings after the event ==
=== Drivers' championship ===
Pos	Driver	MON (Monaco)	SWE (Sweden)	NOR (Norway)	MEX (Mexico)	POR (Portugal)	ARG (Argentina)	ITA (Italy)	GRC (Greece)	FIN (Finland)	GER (Germany)	NZL (New Zealand)	ESP (Spain)	FRA (France)	JPN (Japan)	IRL (Republic of Ireland)	GBR (United Kingdom)	Pts
1	(Finland) Marcus Grönholm	3	1	2	2	4	2	1	1	1	4	1	3	2				104
2	(France) Sébastien Loeb	1	2	14	1	1	1	Ret	2	3	1	2	1	1				100
3	(Finland) Mikko Hirvonen	5	3	1	3	5	3	2	4	2	3	3	4	13				74
4	(Spain) Dani Sordo	2	12	25	4	3	6	3	24	Ret	Ret	6	2	3				45
5	(Norway) Petter Solberg	6	Ret	4	Ret	2	Ret	5	3	Ret	6	7	6	5				38
6	(Australia) Chris Atkinson	4	8	19	5	Ret	7	10	6	4	15	4	8	6				29
7	(Norway) Henning Solberg	14	4	3	9	9	5	4	5	5	14	9	10	9				28
8	(Finland) Jari-Matti Latvala	Ret	Ret	5	7	8	4	9	12	Ret	8	5	7	4				24
9	(Belgium) François Duval								Ret		2		5	Ret				12
10	(Czech Republic) Jan Kopecký	8	10	8		22		Ret	7	Ret	5		Ret	7				10
10	(Finland) Toni Gardemeister	7	6	Ret		DSQ		6			7							10
12	(Sweden) Daniel Carlsson		5	7		6		Ret										9
12	(Austria) Manfred Stohl	10	7	12	6	10	8	7	8	Ret	Ret	12	Ret	14				9
14	(Italy) Gigi Galli		13	6		7												5
15	(Spain) Xavier Pons	25	Ret	16						6	18	Ret	9	8				4
16	(Estonia) Urmo Aava			28		15		13	14	7	12	8	18	Ret				3
17	(United Kingdom) Matthew Wilson	12	Ret	26	8	12	30	12	10	10	9	10	11	Ret				1
17	(Finland) Juho Hänninen		DSQ	17			11	8	Ret	Ret		19	23					1
17	(Norway) Mads Østberg		9	37		Ret		Ret		8								1
Pos	Driver	MON (Monaco)	SWE (Sweden)	NOR (Norway)	MEX (Mexico)	POR (Portugal)	ARG (Argentina)	ITA (Italy)	GRC (Greece)	FIN (Finland)	GER (Germany)	NZL (New Zealand)	ESP (Spain)	FRA (France)	JPN (Japan)	IRL (Republic of Ireland)	GBR (United Kingdom)	Pts

Key
Colour	Result
Gold	Winner
Silver	2nd place
Bronze	3rd place
Green	Points finish
Blue	Non-points finish
Blue	Non-classified finish (NC)
Purple	Did not finish (Ret)
Black	Excluded (EX)
Black	Disqualified (DSQ)
White	Did not start (DNS)
White	Cancelled (C)
Blank	Withdrew entry from the event (WD)

=== Manufacturers' championship ===
Rank	Manufacturer	Event																Total points
Rank	Manufacturer	MON (Monaco)	SWE (Sweden)	NOR (Norway)	MEX (Mexico)	POR (Portugal)	ARG (Argentina)	ITA (Italy)	GRC (Greece)	FIN (Finland)	GER (Germany)	NZL (New Zealand)	ESP (Spain)	FRA (France)	JPN (Japan)	IRL (Republic of Ireland)	GBR (United Kingdom)	Total points
1	BP Ford World Rally Team	10	16	18	14	9	14	18	15	18	11	16	11	9	-	-	-	179
2	Citroën Total World Rally Team	18	9	1	15	16	13	6	8	6	10	11	18	16	-	-	-	147
3	Subaru World Rally Team	8	2	5	4	8	2	5	9	5	5	7	4	7	-	-	-	71
4	Stobart VK M-Sport Ford	1	5	10	3	2	9	7	4	4	5	5	2	7	-	-	-	64
5	OMV Kronos	2	7	5	3	4	1	3	2	0	8	0	4	0	-	-	-	39
6	Munchi's Ford World Rally Team		0		0		0	0	1	5		0	0		-	-	-	6
