= 2007 Rally Japan =

Japanese race car competition

2007 Rally Japan 4th Rally Japan
Round 14 of the 2007 World Rally Championship
| ← Previous event | Next event → |
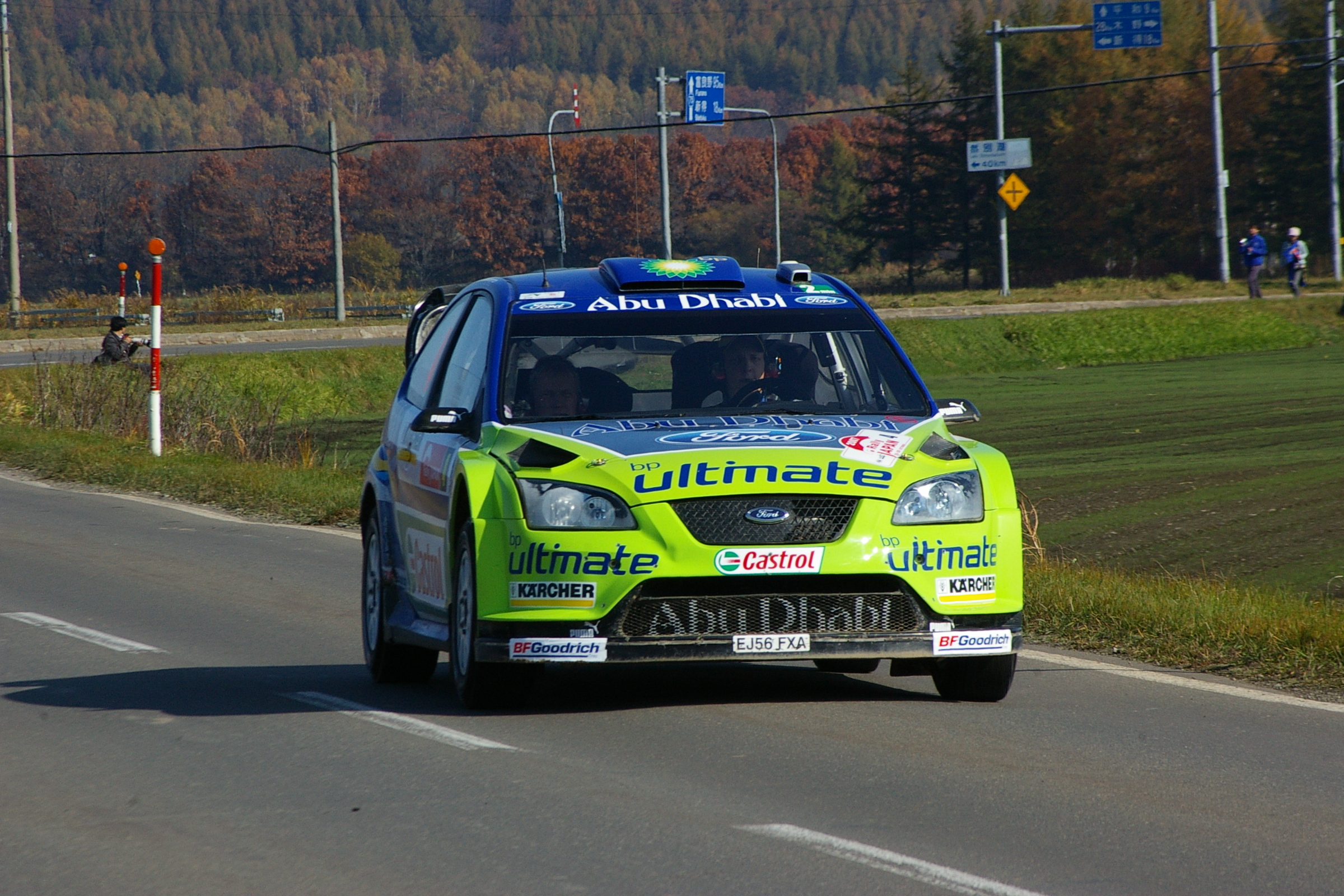
- Rally winner Mikko Hirvonen.
- Host country: Japan
- Rally base: Obihiro, Hokkaidō, Japan
- Dates run: October 26 – 28 2007
- Stages: 27 (350.19 km; 217.60 miles)
- Stage surface: Gravel
- Overall distance: 1,575.79 km (979.15 miles)

Statistics
- Crews: 84 at start, 73 at finish

Overall results
- Overall winner: (Finland) Mikko Hirvonen (United Kingdom) BP Ford World Rally Team; Ford Focus RS WRC 07

The 2007 Rally Japan was the 14th round of the 2007 World Rally Championship. It took place between 26 and 28 October 2007.

== Report ==
Ford driver Mikko Hirvonen overtook Jari-Matti Latvala to take the lead on Friday afternoon and remained in first place for the rest of the rally. His teammate Marcus Grönholm had retired earlier that day, while Hirvonen stayed ahead of Sébastien Loeb.

The situation changed on Saturday afternoon. Loeb was also eliminated after his co-driver Daniel Elena misread a pace note. Third-placed Latvala, who had led the rally at the start, also had to retire after an accident. Both later started again under the Rallye 2 regulations. So Hirvonen had a new pursuer Daniel Sordo. However, Hirvonen's lead was already large enough for him to control the rally. In the end, Hirvonen had a 37.4 second lead over Sordo. Loeb won four special stages on Sunday, after which he finally had to retire due to oil pressure problems.

== Results ==
| Pos. | Driver | Co-driver | Car | Time | Difference | Points |
WRC
| 1. | (Finland) Mikko Hirvonen | (Finland) Jarmo Lehtinen | Ford Focus RS WRC 07 | 3:23:57.6 | 0.0 | 10 |
| 2. | (Spain) Daniel Sordo | (Spain) Marc Marti | Citroën C4 WRC | 3:24:35.0 | 37.4 | 8 |
| 3. | (Norway) Henning Solberg | (Norway) Cato Menkerud | Ford Focus RS WRC 06 | 3:28:31.3 | 4:33.7 | 6 |
| 4. | (United Kingdom) Matthew Wilson | (United Kingdom) Michael Orr | Ford Focus RS WRC 06 | 3:30:35.5 | 6:37.9 | 5 |
| 5. | (Argentina) Luís Pérez Companc | (Argentina) Jose Maria Volta | Ford Focus RS WRC 06 | 3:30:38.0 | 6:40.4 | 4 |
| 6. | (Austria) Manfred Stohl | (Austria) Ilka Minor | Citroën Xsara WRC | 3:31:01.9 | 7:04.3 | 3 |
| 7. | (Argentina) Federico Villagra | (Argentina) José Luis Díaz | Ford Focus RS WRC 06 | 3:35:12.9 | 11:15.3 | 2 |
| 8. | (Japan) Katsuhiko Taguchi | (Australia) Mark Stacey | Mitsubishi Lancer Evo 9 | 3:44:37.7 | 20:40.1 | 1 |
PWRC
| 1. (9.) | (Argentina) Gabriel Pozzo | (Argentina) Daniel Stillo | Mitsubishi Lancer Evo 9 | 3:45:50.6 | 0.0 | 10 |
| 2. (11.) | (Poland) Leszek Kuzaj | (United Kingdom) Craig Parry | Subaru Impreza WRX STI | 3:48:30.7 | 2:40.1 | 8 |
| 3. (12.) | (Japan) Takuma Kamada | (Japan) Naoki Kase | Subaru Impreza WRX STI | 3:48:39.0 | 2:48.4 | 6 |
| 4. (17.) | (Russia) Yevgeni Vertunov | (Russia) Georgi Troshkin | Subaru Impreza WRX STI | 3:50:41.7 | 4:51.1 | 5 |
| 5. (19.) | (United Kingdom) Mark Higgins | (United Kingdom) Scott Martin | Mitsubishi Lancer Evo 9 | 3:51:23.3 | 5:32.7 | 4 |
| 6. (21.) | (Sweden) Patrik Flodin | (Sweden) Maria Andersson | Subaru Impreza WRX STI | 3:58:39.6 | 12:49.0 | 3 |
| 7. (23.) | (Finland) Juho Hänninen | (Finland) Mikko Markkula | Mitsubishi Lancer Evo 9 | 4:03:12.4 | 17:21.8 | 2 |
| 8. (10.) | (Japan) Yoshio Ikemachi | (Japan) Sadatoshi Ando | Subaru Impreza WRX STI | 4:03:48.7 | 17:58.1 | 1 |

== Retirements ==
- (Finland) Marcus Grönholm - went off the road (SS4);
- (Australia) Chris Atkinson - crashed his car (SS6);
- (Japan) Fumio Nutahara - mechanical (SS14);
- (France) Sébastien Loeb - mechanical (SS26);
- (Portugal) Armindo Araujo - excluded after post-rally technical check;

== Special Stages ==
All dates and times are JST (UTC+9).

| Leg | Stage | Time | Name | Length | Winner | Time | Avg. spd. | Rally leader |
|---|---|---|---|---|---|---|---|---|
| 1 (26 Oct) | SS1 | 07:33 | Pawse Kamuy reverse 1 | 9.03 km | (Finland) J. Latvala | 4:48.9 | 112.5 km/h | (Finland) J. Latvala |
| 1 (26 Oct) | SS2 | 08:13 | Cup Kamuy 1 | 13.95 km | (Finland) M. Grönholm | 8:29.7 | 98.5 km/h | (Finland) J. Latvala |
| 1 (26 Oct) | SS3 | 08:36 | Kimun Kamuy 1 | 26.03 km | (France) S. Loeb | 13:56.0 | 112.1 km/h | (Finland) M. Grönholm |
| 1 (26 Oct) | SS4 | 09:29 | Rikubetsu 1 | 2.73 km | (Spain) D. Sordo | 2:05.4 | 78.4 km/h | (Finland) J. Latvala |
| 1 (26 Oct) | SS5 | 13:35 | Pawse Kamuy reverse 2 | 9.03 km | (Finland) J. Latvala | 4:39.1 | 116.5 km/h | (Finland) J. Latvala |
| 1 (26 Oct) | SS6 | 14:15 | Cup Kamuy | 13.95 km | (Finland) M. Hirvonen | 8:09.0 | 102.7 km/h | (Finland) M. Hirvonen |
| 1 (26 Oct) | SS7 | 14:38 | Kimun Kamuy 2 | 26.03 km | (Finland) M. Hirvonen | 13:26.7 | 116.2 km/h | (Finland) M. Hirvonen |
| 1 (26 Oct) | SS8 | 15:31 | Rikubetsu 2 | 2.73 km | (Spain) D. Sordo | 2:04.2 | 79.1 km/h | (Finland) M. Hirvonen |
| 1 (26 Oct) | SS9 | 17:44 | Obihiro 1 | 1.35 km | (Portugal) A. Araujo | 1:18.5 | 61.9 km/h | (Finland) M. Hirvonen |
| 1 (26 Oct) | SS10 | 17:54 | Obihiro 2 | 1.35 km | (Spain) X. Pons | 1:16.8 | 63.3 km/h | (Finland) M. Hirvonen |
| 2 (27 Oct) | SS11 | 07:13 | Rikubetsu 3 | 2.73 km | (France) S. Loeb | 2:06.8 | 77.5 km/h | (Finland) M. Hirvonen |
| 2 (27 Oct) | SS12 | 07:44 | Puray 1 | 34.96 km | (Finland) M. Hirvonen | 19:28.3 | 107.7 km/h | (Finland) M. Hirvonen |
| 2 (27 Oct) | SS13 | 08:23 | Niueo 1 | 20.75 km | (Spain) D. Sordo | 12:31.3 | 99.4 km/h | (Finland) M. Hirvonen |
| 2 (27 Oct) | SS14 | 09:01 | Sipirkakim 1 | 22.43 km | (Norway) P. Solberg | 12:13.1 | 110.1 km/h | (Finland) M. Hirvonen |
| 2 (27 Oct) | SS15 | 13:44 | Rikubetsu 4 | 2.73 km | (Norway) P. Solberg | 2:05.6 | 78.2 km/h | (Finland) M. Hirvonen |
| 2 (27 Oct) | SS16 | 14:15 | Puray 2 | 34.96 km | (Norway) P. Solberg | 19:01.0 | 110.3 km/h | (Finland) M. Hirvonen |
| 2 (27 Oct) | SS17 | 14:54 | Niueo 2 | 20.75 km | (Spain) D. Sordo | 12:17.5 | 101.3 km/h | (Finland) M. Hirvonen |
| 2 (27 Oct) | SS18 | 15:47 | Sipirkakim Short | 4.67 km | (Norway) P. Solberg | 2:42.4 | 103.5 km/h | (Finland) M. Hirvonen |
| 2 (27 Oct) | SS19 | 17:57 | Obihiro 3 | 1.35 km | (Argentina) F. Villagra | 1:21.4 | 59.7 km/h | (Finland) M. Hirvonen |
| 2 (27 Oct) | SS20 | 18:07 | Obihiro 4 | 1.35 km | (Argentina) F. Villagra | 1:22.0 | 59.3 km/h | (Finland) M. Hirvonen |
| 3 (28 Oct) | SS21 | 07:06 | Rera Kamuy 1 | 8.76 km | (France) S. Loeb | 5:10.1 | 101.7 km/h | (Finland) M. Hirvonen |
| 3 (28 Oct) | SS22 | 07:29 | Panke Nikorpet 1 | 17.04 km | (Spain) D. Sordo | 9:35.0 | 106.7 km/h | (Finland) M. Hirvonen |
| 3 (28 Oct) | SS23 | 08:09 | Penke 1 | 22.19 km | (France) S. Loeb | 13:23.8 | 99.4 km/h | (Finland) M. Hirvonen |
| 3 (28 Oct) | SS24 | 11:35 | Rera Kamuy 2 | 8.76 km | (France) S. Loeb | 5:02.5 | 104.3 km/h | (Finland) M. Hirvonen |
| 3 (28 Oct) | SS25 | 11:58 | Panke Nikorpet 2 | 17.04 km | (France) S. Loeb | 9:17.9 | 110.0 km/h | (Finland) M. Hirvonen |
| 3 (28 Oct) | SS26 | 12:38 | Penke 2 | 22.19 km | (Spain) D. Sordo | 13:05.4 | 101.7 km/h | (Finland) M. Hirvonen |
| 3 (28 Oct) | SS27 | 14:33 | Obihiro 5 | 1.35 km | (Argentina) F. Villagra | 1:23.6 | 58.1 km/h | (Finland) M. Hirvonen |

== Championship standings after the event ==
=== Drivers' championship ===
| Pos | Driver | MON (Monaco) | SWE (Sweden) | NOR (Norway) | MEX (Mexico) | POR (Portugal) | ARG (Argentina) | ITA (Italy) | GRC (Greece) | FIN (Finland) | GER (Germany) | NZL (New Zealand) | ESP (Spain) | FRA (France) | JPN (Japan) | IRL (Republic of Ireland) | GBR (United Kingdom) | Pts |
|---|---|---|---|---|---|---|---|---|---|---|---|---|---|---|---|---|---|---|
| 1 | (Finland) Marcus Grönholm | 3 | 1 | 2 | 2 | 4 | 2 | 1 | 1 | 1 | 4 | 1 | 3 | 2 | Ret | | | 104 |
| 2 | (France) Sébastien Loeb | 1 | 2 | 14 | 1 | 1 | 1 | Ret | 2 | 3 | 1 | 2 | 1 | 1 | Ret | | | 100 |
| 3 | (Finland) Mikko Hirvonen | 5 | 3 | 1 | 3 | 5 | 3 | 2 | 4 | 2 | 3 | 3 | 4 | 13 | 1 | | | 84 |
| 4 | (Spain) Dani Sordo | 2 | 12 | 25 | 4 | 3 | 6 | 3 | 24 | Ret | Ret | 6 | 2 | 3 | 2 | | | 53 |
| 5 | (Norway) Petter Solberg | 6 | Ret | 4 | Ret | 2 | Ret | 5 | 3 | Ret | 6 | 7 | 6 | 5 | Ret | | | 38 |
| 6 | (Norway) Henning Solberg | 14 | 4 | 3 | 9 | 9 | 5 | 4 | 5 | 5 | 14 | 9 | 10 | 9 | 3 | | | 34 |
| 7 | (Australia) Chris Atkinson | 4 | 8 | 19 | 5 | Ret | 7 | 10 | 6 | 4 | 15 | 4 | 8 | 6 | Ret | | | 29 |
| 8 | (Finland) Jari-Matti Latvala | Ret | Ret | 5 | 7 | 8 | 4 | 9 | 12 | Ret | 8 | 5 | 7 | 4 | 26 | | | 24 |
| 9 | (Belgium) François Duval | | | | | | | | Ret | | 2 | | 5 | Ret | | | | 12 |
| 9 | (Austria) Manfred Stohl | 10 | 7 | 12 | 6 | 10 | 8 | 7 | 8 | Ret | Ret | 12 | Ret | 14 | 6 | | | 12 |
| 11 | (Czech Republic) Jan Kopecký | 8 | 10 | 8 | | 22 | | Ret | 7 | Ret | 5 | | Ret | 7 | | | | 10 |
| 11 | (Finland) Toni Gardemeister | 7 | 6 | Ret | | DSQ | | 6 | | | 7 | | | | | | | 10 |
| 13 | (Sweden) Daniel Carlsson | | 5 | 7 | | 6 | | Ret | | | | | | | | | | 9 |
| 14 | (United Kingdom) Matthew Wilson | 12 | Ret | 26 | 8 | 12 | 30 | 12 | 10 | 10 | 9 | 10 | 11 | Ret | 4 | | | 6 |
| 15 | (Italy) Gigi Galli | | 13 | 6 | | 7 | | | | | | | | | | | | 5 |
| 16 | (Argentina) Luís Pérez Companc | | 15 | | 19 | DNS | 28 | Ret | 11 | 11 | | 23 | Ret | | 5 | | | 4 |
| 16 | (Spain) Xavier Pons | 25 | Ret | 16 | | | | | | 6 | 18 | Ret | 9 | 8 | 36 | | | 4 |
| 18 | (Estonia) Urmo Aava | | | 28 | | 15 | | 13 | 14 | 7 | 12 | 8 | 18 | Ret | 18 | | | 3 |
| 19 | (Argentina) Federico Villagra | | | | | DNS | 9 | 11 | 32 | 14 | | 11 | 13 | | 7 | | | 2 |
| 20 | (Finland) Juho Hänninen | | DSQ | 17 | | | 11 | 8 | Ret | Ret | | 19 | 23 | | 24 | | | 1 |
| 20 | (Norway) Mads Østberg | | 9 | 37 | | Ret | | Ret | | 8 | | | | | | | | 1 |
| 20 | (Japan) Katsuhiko Taguchi | | | | | | | | | | | | | | 8 | | | 1 |
| Pos | Driver | MON (Monaco) | SWE (Sweden) | NOR (Norway) | MEX (Mexico) | POR (Portugal) | ARG (Argentina) | ITA (Italy) | GRC (Greece) | FIN (Finland) | GER (Germany) | NZL (New Zealand) | ESP (Spain) | FRA (France) | JPN (Japan) | IRL (Republic of Ireland) | GBR (United Kingdom) | Pts |

Key
| Colour | Result |
|---|---|
| Gold | Winner |
| Silver | 2nd place |
| Bronze | 3rd place |
| Green | Points finish |
| Blue | Non-points finish |
| Blue | Non-classified finish (NC) |
| Purple | Did not finish (Ret) |
| Black | Excluded (EX) |
| Black | Disqualified (DSQ) |
| White | Did not start (DNS) |
| White | Cancelled (C) |
| Blank | Withdrew entry from the event (WD) |

=== Manufacturers' championship ===
| Rank | Manufacturer | Event | | | | | | | | | | | | | | | | Total points |
| Rank | Manufacturer | MON (Monaco) | SWE (Sweden) | NOR (Norway) | MEX (Mexico) | POR (Portugal) | ARG (Argentina) | ITA (Italy) | GRC (Greece) | FIN (Finland) | GER (Germany) | NZL (New Zealand) | ESP (Spain) | FRA (France) | JPN (Japan) | IRL (Republic of Ireland) | GBR (United Kingdom) | Total points |
|---|---|---|---|---|---|---|---|---|---|---|---|---|---|---|---|---|---|---|
| 1 | BP Ford World Rally Team | 10 | 16 | 18 | 14 | 9 | 14 | 18 | 15 | 18 | 11 | 16 | 11 | 9 | 10 | - | - | 189 |
| 2 | Citroën Total World Rally Team | 18 | 9 | 1 | 15 | 16 | 13 | 6 | 8 | 6 | 10 | 11 | 18 | 16 | 8 | - | - | 155 |
| 3 | Subaru World Rally Team | 8 | 2 | 5 | 4 | 8 | 2 | 5 | 9 | 5 | 5 | 7 | 4 | 7 | 2 | - | - | 73 |
| 4 | Stobart VK M-Sport Ford | 1 | 5 | 10 | 3 | 2 | 9 | 7 | 4 | 4 | 5 | 5 | 2 | 7 | 7 | - | - | 71 |
| 5 | OMV Kronos | 2 | 7 | 5 | 3 | 4 | 1 | 3 | 2 | 0 | 8 | 0 | 4 | 0 | 4 | - | - | 43 |
| 6 | Munchi's Ford World Rally Team | | 0 | | 0 | | 0 | 0 | 1 | 5 | | 0 | 0 | | 8 | - | - | 14 |
