= 2007 Swedish Rally =

World Rally Championship event

2007 Swedish Rally 56th Uddeholm Swedish Rally
Round 2 of the 2007 World Rally Championship
← Previous event	Next event →
- Host country: Sweden
- Rally base: Karlstad, Sweden
- Dates run: 8 – 11 February 2007
- Stages: 20 (341.2 km; 212.0 miles)
- Stage surface: Ice / Snow-covered gravel
- Overall distance: 1,730.36 km (1,075.20 miles)

Statistics
- Crews: 58 at start, 45 at finish

Overall results
- Overall winner: (Finland) Marcus Grönholm (United Kingdom) BP Ford World Rally Team

The 56th Uddeholm Swedish Rally, second round of the 2007 World Rally Championship season took place between 9 and 11 February 2007.

== Results ==
Pos.	Driver	Co-driver	Car	Time	Difference	Points
WRC
1.	(Finland) Marcus Grönholm	(Finland) Timo Rautiainen	Ford Focus RS WRC 06	3:08:40.7	0.0	10
2.	(France) Sébastien Loeb	(Monaco) Daniel Elena	Citroën C4 WRC	3:09:34.5	53.8	8
3.	(Finland) Mikko Hirvonen	(Finland) Jarmo Lehtinen	Ford Focus RS WRC 06	3:10:22.2	1:41.5	6
4.	(Norway) Henning Solberg	(Norway) Cato Menkerud	Ford Focus RS WRC 06	3:10:50.5	2:09.8	5
5.	(Sweden) Daniel Carlsson	(France) Denis Giraudet	Citroën Xsara WRC	3:14:55.2	3:37.8	4
6.	(Finland) Toni Gardemeister	(Finland) Jakke Honkanen	Mitsubishi Lancer WR05	3:12:34.9	3:54.2	3
7.	(Austria) Manfred Stohl	(Austria) Ilka Minor	Citroën Xsara WRC	3:13:53.2	5:12.5	2
8.	(Australia) Chris Atkinson	(Australia) Glenn MacNeall	Subaru Impreza WRC06	3:14:55.4	6:14.7	1
PCWRC
DSQ ^{[1]}	(Finland) Juho Hänninen	(Finland) Mikko Markkula	Mitsubishi Lancer Evo 9	3:23:01.8	0.0	-
1. (16.)	(Sweden) Oscar Svedlund	(Sweden) Björn Nilsson	Subaru Impreza WRX STI	3:25:29.2	2:27.4	10
2. (17.)	(Finland) Anton Alén	(Finland) Timo Alanne	Subaru Impreza WRX STI	3:26:07.8	3:06.0	8
3. (18.)	(Finland) Kristian Sohlberg	(Finland) Risto Pietiläinen	Subaru Impreza WRX STI	3:27:11.9	4:10.1	6
4. (20.)	(Portugal) Armindo Araújo	(Portugal) Miguel Ramalho	Mitsubishi Lancer Evo 9	3:30:07.7	7:05.9	5
5. (22.)	(Japan) Fumio Nutahara	(United Kingdom) Daniel Barritt	Mitsubishi Lancer Evo 9	3:30:34.9	7:33.1	4
6. (23.)	(Japan) Toshi Arai	(New Zealand) Tony Sircombe	Subaru Impreza WRX STI	3:33:29.7	10:27.9	3
7. (27.)	(Qatar) Nasser Al-Attiyah	(United Kingdom) Chris Patterson	Subaru Impreza WRX STI	3:45:19.0 ^{[2]}	22:17.2	2
8. (29.)	(Italy) Fabio Frisiero	(Italy) Simone Scattolin	Mitsubishi Lancer Evo 9	3:50:02.9	27:01.1	1
^{[1]} — Juho Hänninen was disqualified after technical check - fuel tank was not homologated.				^{[2]} — Drivers using SupeRally.		

== Retirements ==
- (Sweden) Jimmy Joge - gearbox problems (SS2);
- (Spain) Xavier Pons - went off the road (SS5);
- (Norway) Petter Solberg - retired to preserve the car (SS12);
- (Russia) Aleksandr Dorosinski - engine problems (SS15);
- (United Kingdom) Matthew Wilson - engine problems (SS16/17);
- (Finland) Jari-Matti Latvala - gearbox problems (SS16/17);
- (United Kingdom) Mark Higgins - went off the road (SS18);
- (Czech Republic) Martin Prokop - technical problems after tire puncture (SS19);
- (Argentina) Juan Pablo Raies - excluded (after the event);
- (Finland) Juho Hänninen - excluded (after the event);

== Special Stages ==
All dates and times are CET (UTC+1).

Leg	Stage	Time	Name	Length	Winner	Time	Avg. spd.	Rally leader
1 (8 Feb - 9 Feb)	SS1	08:03	Karlstad Super Speci	1.89 km	(Finland) T. Gardemeister	1:31.9	74.04 km/h	(Finland) T. Gardemeister
1 (8 Feb - 9 Feb)	SS2	08:43	Likenas 1	21.78 km	(Norway) P. Solberg	12:40.6	103.09 km/h	(Norway) P. Solberg
1 (8 Feb - 9 Feb)	SS3	10:06	Hara 1	11.31 km	(Italy) G. Galli	6:22.6	106.42 km/h	(Norway) P. Solberg
1 (8 Feb - 9 Feb)	SS4	10:44	Torntorp 1	19.20 km	(France) S. Loeb	9:56.8	115.82 km/h	(Norway) P. Solberg
1 (8 Feb - 9 Feb)	SS5	13:27	Likenas 2	21.78 km	(Finland) M. Grönholm	12:21.5	105.74 km/h	(Finland) M. Grönholm
1 (8 Feb - 9 Feb)	SS6	14:49	Hara 2	11.31 km	(Finland) M. Grönholm	6:10.1	110.01 km/h	(Finland) M. Grönholm
1 (8 Feb - 9 Feb)	SS7	15:28	Vargasen 1	24.62 km	(France) S. Loeb	13:57.7	105.8 km/h	(Finland) M. Grönholm
1 (8 Feb - 9 Feb)	SS8	16:46	Hagfors Sprint 1	1.87 km	(Finland) M. Grönholm	2:00.0	56.1 km/h	(Finland) M. Grönholm
2 (10 Feb)	SS9	08:03	Lesjofors	10.48 km	(France) S. Loeb	5:45.1	109.32 km/h	(Finland) M. Grönholm
2 (10 Feb)	SS10	08:43	Liljendal	34.54 km	(Finland) M. Grönholm	17:50.3	116.18 km/h	(Finland) M. Grönholm
2 (10 Feb)	SS11	11:13	Torntorp 2	19.20 km	(Finland) M. Grönholm	9:35.0	120.21 km/h	(Finland) M. Grönholm
2 (10 Feb)	SS12	11:45	Vargasen 2	24.62 km	(Finland) M. Grönholm	13:17.9	111.08 km/h	(Finland) M. Grönholm
2 (10 Feb)	SS13	14:28	Fredriksberg	24.75 km	(Finland) M. Grönholm	13:54.4	106.78 km/h	(Finland) M. Grönholm
2 (10 Feb)	SS14	15:33	Lejen	26.46 km	(Finland) M. Grönholm	14:41.8	108.02 km/h	(Finland) M. Grönholm
2 (10 Feb)	SS15	16:51	Hagfors Sprint 2	1.87 km	(Norway) M. Østberg	1:59.3	56.43 km/h	(Finland) M. Grönholm
3 (11 Feb)	SS16	08:18	Bačka 1	30.95 km	(Australia) C. Atkinson	16:31.6	112.36 km/h	(Finland) M. Grönholm
3 (11 Feb)	SS17	09:15	Malta 1	11.25 km	(Norway) H. Solberg	5:42.2	118.35 km/h	(Finland) M. Grönholm
3 (11 Feb)	SS18	10:54	Bačka 2	30.95 km	(Finland) M. Grönholm	16:30.0	112.55 km/h	(Finland) M. Grönholm
3 (11 Feb)	SS19	11:57	Malta 2	11.25 km	(Finland) M. Grönholm	5:44.1	117.7 km/h	(Finland) M. Grönholm
3 (11 Feb)	SS20	14:00	Karlstad Super Speci	1.89 km	(Finland) M. Grönholm	1:40.7	67.57 km/h	(Finland) M. Grönholm

== Championship standings after the event ==
=== Drivers' championship ===
Pos	Driver	MON (Monaco)	SWE (Sweden)	NOR (Norway)	MEX (Mexico)	POR (Portugal)	ARG (Argentina)	ITA (Italy)	GRC (Greece)	FIN (Finland)	GER (Germany)	NZL (New Zealand)	ESP (Spain)	FRA (France)	JPN (Japan)	IRL (Republic of Ireland)	GBR (United Kingdom)	Pts
1	(France) Sébastien Loeb	1	2															18
2	(Finland) Marcus Grönholm	3	1															16
3	(Finland) Mikko Hirvonen	5	3															10
4	(Spain) Dani Sordo	2	12															8
5	(Australia) Chris Atkinson	4	8															6
6	(Norway) Henning Solberg	14	4															5
6	(Finland) Toni Gardemeister	7	6															5
8	(Sweden) Daniel Carlsson		5															4
9	(Norway) Petter Solberg	6	Ret															3
10	(Austria) Manfred Stohl	10	7															2
11	(Czech Republic) Jan Kopecký	8	10															1
Pos	Driver	MON (Monaco)	SWE (Sweden)	NOR (Norway)	MEX (Mexico)	POR (Portugal)	ARG (Argentina)	ITA (Italy)	GRC (Greece)	FIN (Finland)	GER (Germany)	NZL (New Zealand)	ESP (Spain)	FRA (France)	JPN (Japan)	IRL (Republic of Ireland)	GBR (United Kingdom)	Pts

Key
Colour	Result
Gold	Winner
Silver	2nd place
Bronze	3rd place
Green	Points finish
Blue	Non-points finish
Blue	Non-classified finish (NC)
Purple	Did not finish (Ret)
Black	Excluded (EX)
Black	Disqualified (DSQ)
White	Did not start (DNS)
White	Cancelled (C)
Blank	Withdrew entry from the event (WD)

=== Manufacturers' championship ===
Rank	Manufacturer	Event																Total points
Rank	Manufacturer	MON (Monaco)	SWE (Sweden)	NOR (Norway)	MEX (Mexico)	POR (Portugal)	ARG (Argentina)	ITA (Italy)	GRC (Greece)	FIN (Finland)	GER (Germany)	NZL (New Zealand)	ESP (Spain)	FRA (France)	JPN (Japan)	IRL (Republic of Ireland)	GBR (United Kingdom)	Total points
1	Citroën Total World Rally Team	18	9	-	-	-	-	-	-	-	-	-	-	-	-	-	-	27
2	BP Ford World Rally Team	10	16	-	-	-	-	-	-	-	-	-	-	-	-	-	-	26
3	Subaru World Rally Team	8	2	-	-	-	-	-	-	-	-	-	-	-	-	-	-	10
4	OMV Kronos	2	7	-	-	-	-	-	-	-	-	-	-	-	-	-	-	9
5	Stobart VK M-Sport Ford	1	5	-	-	-	-	-	-	-	-	-	-	-	-	-	-	6
6	Munchi's Ford World Rally Team		0	-	-	-	-	-	-	-	-	-	-	-	-	-	-	0
