= 2007 Acropolis Rally =

Rallying motorsport event

2007 Acropolis Rally 54th BP Ultimate Acropolis Rally of Greece
Round 8 of the 2007 World Rally Championship
← Previous event	Next event →
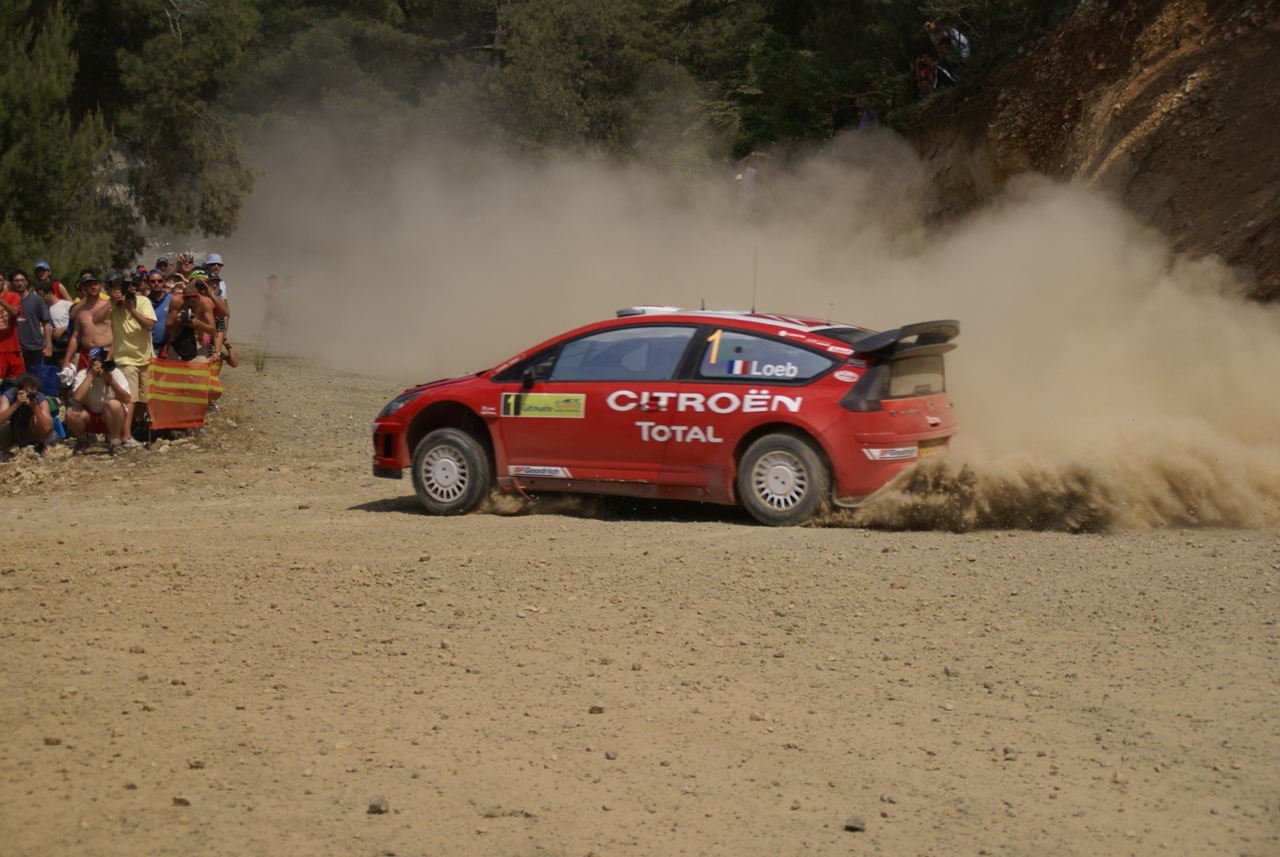
- Sébastien Loeb
- Host country: Greece
- Rally base: Athens, Greece
- Dates run: May 31 – June 3, 2007
- Stages: 21 (334.44 km; 207.81 miles)
- Stage surface: Gravel
- Overall distance: 1,572.33 km (977.00 miles)

Statistics
- Crews: 64 at start, 49 at finish

Overall results
- Overall winner: (Finland) Marcus Grönholm (United Kingdom) BP Ford World Rally Team

Results of Acropolis Rally (54th BP Ultimate Acropolis Rally of Greece), 8th round of 2007 World Rally Championship, was run on May 31 - June 3:

== Results ==
Pos.	Driver	Co-driver	Car	Time	Difference	Points
WRC
1.	(Finland) Marcus Grönholm	(Finland) Timo Rautiainen	Ford Focus RS WRC 06	3:49:22.6	0.0	10
2.	(France) Sébastien Loeb	(Monaco) Daniel Elena	Citroën C4 WRC	3:50:01.0	38.4	8
3.	(Norway) Petter Solberg	(United Kingdom) Phil Mills	Subaru Impreza WRC 07	3:50:56.7	1:34.1	6
4.	(Finland) Mikko Hirvonen	(Finland) Jarmo Lehtinen	Ford Focus RS WRC 06	3:52:03.9	2:41.3	5
5.	(Norway) Henning Solberg	(Norway) Cato Menkerud	Ford Focus RS WRC 06	3:54:15.3	4:52.7	4
6.	(Australia) Chris Atkinson	(Belgium) Stéphane Prévot	Subaru Impreza WRC 07	3:55:54.3	6:31.7	3
7.	(Czech Republic) Jan Kopecký	(Czech Republic) Filip Schovánek	Škoda Fabia WRC	3:57:38.4	8:15.8	2
8.	(Austria) Manfred Stohl	(Austria) Ilka Minor	Citroën Xsara WRC	3:58:18.8	8:56.2	1
PCWRC
1. (15.)	(Japan) Toshi Arai	(New Zealand) Tony Sircombe	Subaru Impreza WRX STI	4:10:08.9	0.0	10
2. (16.)	(Austria) Andreas Aigner	(West Germany) Klaus Wicha	Mitsubishi Lancer Evo 9	4:13:07.3	2:58.4	8
3. (17.)	(San Marino) Mirco Baldacci	(Italy) Giovanni Agnese	Subaru Impreza WRX STI	4:13:21.8	3:12.9	6
4. (18.)	(United Kingdom) Mark Higgins	(United Kingdom) Scott Martin	Mitsubishi Lancer Evo 9	4:14:50.8	4:41.9	5
5. (19.)	(Qatar) Nasser Al-Attiyah	(United Kingdom) Chris Patterson	Subaru Impreza WRX STI	4:14:59.2	4:50.3	4
6. (21.)	(Japan) Takuma Kamada	(Japan) Naoki Kase	Subaru Impreza WRX STI	4:16:31.5	6:22.6	3
7. (23.)	(Argentina) Gabriel Pozzo	(Argentina) Daniel Stillo	Mitsubishi Lancer Evo 9	4:19:44.2	9:35.3	2
8. (25.)	(Italy) Simone Campedelli	(Italy) Danilo Fappani	Mitsubishi Lancer Evo 9	4:20:51.3	10:42.4	1

== Retirements ==
- (Belgium) François Duval - engine failure (SS4/5);
- (Poland) Leszek Kuzaj - mechanical, his car burned down (SS10);
- (Finland) Kristian Sohlberg - tyre problems (SS12/13);
- (Finland) Juho Hanninen - steering arm/fuel pump failure (SS19);

== Special Stages ==
Leg	Stage	Time (EEST)	Name	Length	Winner	Time	Avg. spd.	Rally leader
1 (31 May - 1 Jun)	SS1	19:00	SSS Hippodrome 1	3.20 km	(Finland) M. Hirvonen	2:50.8	67.45 km/h	(Finland) M. Hirvonen
1 (31 May - 1 Jun)	SS2	09:13	Schimatari 1	11.56 km	(Finland) M. Grönholm	10:17.6	67.38 km/h	(Finland) M. Grönholm
1 (31 May - 1 Jun)	SS3	10:01	Thiva 1	23.76 km	(Australia) C. Atkinson	16:39.0	85.62 km/h	(Australia) C. Atkinson
1 (31 May - 1 Jun)	SS4	11:17	Agia Sotira 1	15.19 km	(Australia) C. Atkinson	9:39.4	94.38 km/h	(Australia) C. Atkinson
1 (31 May - 1 Jun)	SS5	12:40	Olympic Properties 1	5.15 km	(Norway) P. Solberg	3:33.7	86.76 km/h	(Australia) C. Atkinson
1 (31 May - 1 Jun)	SS6	14:55	Schimatari 2	11.56 km	(Finland) M. Grönholm	10:10.1	68.21 km/h	(Australia) C. Atkinson
1 (31 May - 1 Jun)	SS7	15:43	Thiva 2	23.76 km	(Spain) D. Sordo	16:13.2	87.89 km/h	(Finland) M. Grönholm
1 (31 May - 1 Jun)	SS8	16:59	Agia Sotira 2	15.19 km	(France) S.Loeb	9:25.6	96.68 km/h	(Finland) M. Grönholm
1 (31 May - 1 Jun)	SS9	18:00	Imittos 1	11.43 km	CANCELLED	-	-	(Finland) M. Grönholm
2 (2 Jun)	SS10	09:03	Agii Theodori 1	48.88 km	(Finland) M. Grönholm	32:47.9	89.42 km/h	(Finland) M. Grönholm
2 (2 Jun)	SS11	10:36	Loutraki 1	9.18 km	(France) S.Loeb	7:21.1	74.92 km/h	(Finland) M. Grönholm
2 (2 Jun)	SS12	11:41	Agia Triada 1	10.80 km	(Norway) P. Solberg	7:24.5	87.47 km/h	(Finland) M. Grönholm
2 (2 Jun)	SS13	12:54	Olympic Properties 2	5.15 km	(Norway) P. Solberg	3:23.4	91.15 km/h	(Finland) M. Grönholm
2 (2 Jun)	SS14	15:19	Agii Theodori 2	48.88 km	(Finland) M. Grönholm	32:33.0	90.1 km/h	(Finland) M. Grönholm
2 (2 Jun)	SS15	16:52	Loutraki 2	9.18 km	(France) S.Loeb	7:14.7	76.02 km/h	(Finland) M. Grönholm
2 (2 Jun)	SS16	17:57	Agia Triada 2	10.80 km	(France) S.Loeb	7:17.2	88.93 km/h	(Finland) M. Grönholm
2 (2 Jun)	SS17	19:17	SSS Hippodrome 2	3.20 km	(France) S.Loeb	2:52.8	66.67 km/h	(Finland) M. Grönholm
3 (3 Jun)	SS18	07:33	Avlonas 1	20.00	(France) S.Loeb	12:05.1	99.3 km/h	(Finland) M. Grönholm
3 (3 Jun)	SS19	08:13	Assopia 1	17.87 km	(Finland) M. Grönholm	10:58.6	97.68 km/h	(Finland) M. Grönholm
3 (3 Jun)	SS20	08:46	Imittos 2	11.43 km	CANCELLED	-	-	(Finland) M. Grönholm
3 (3 Jun)	SS21	12:05	Avlonas 2	20.00 km	(Finland) M. Hirvonen	12:00.0	100.0 km/h	(Finland) M. Grönholm
3 (3 Jun)	SS22	12:45	Assopia 2	17.87	(Finland) J. Latvala	10:47.8	99.31 km/h	(Finland) M. Grönholm
3 (3 Jun)	SS23	14:30	SSS Hippodrome 3	3.20	(Spain) D. Sordo	2:55.4	65.68 km/h	(Finland) M. Grönholm

== Championship standings after the event ==
=== Drivers' championship ===
Pos	Driver	MON (Monaco)	SWE (Sweden)	NOR (Norway)	MEX (Mexico)	POR (Portugal)	ARG (Argentina)	ITA (Italy)	GRC (Greece)	FIN (Finland)	GER (Germany)	NZL (New Zealand)	ESP (Spain)	FRA (France)	JPN (Japan)	IRL (Republic of Ireland)	GBR (United Kingdom)	Pts
1	(Finland) Marcus Grönholm	3	1	2	2	4	2	1	1									65
2	(France) Sébastien Loeb	1	2	14	1	1	1	Ret	2									56
3	(Finland) Mikko Hirvonen	5	3	1	3	5	3	2	4									49
4	(Spain) Dani Sordo	2	12	25	4	3	6	3	24									28
5	(Norway) Petter Solberg	6	Ret	4	Ret	2	Ret	5	3									26
6	(Norway) Henning Solberg	14	4	3	9	11	5	4	5									24
7	(Australia) Chris Atkinson	4	8	19	5	Ret	7	10	6									15
8	(Finland) Jari-Matti Latvala	Ret	Ret	5	7	8	4	9	12									12
9	(Sweden) Daniel Carlsson		5	7		6		Ret										9
9	(Austria) Manfred Stohl	10	7	12	6	10	8	7	8									9
11	(Finland) Toni Gardemeister	7	6	Ret		DSQ		6										8
12	(Italy) Gigi Galli		13	6		7												5
13	(Czech Republic) Jan Kopecký	8	10	8		22		Ret	7									4
14	(United Kingdom) Matthew Wilson	12	Ret	26	8	12	30	12	10									1
14	(Finland) Juho Hänninen		DSQ	17			11	8	Ret									1
Pos	Driver	MON (Monaco)	SWE (Sweden)	NOR (Norway)	MEX (Mexico)	POR (Portugal)	ARG (Argentina)	ITA (Italy)	GRC (Greece)	FIN (Finland)	GER (Germany)	NZL (New Zealand)	ESP (Spain)	FRA (France)	JPN (Japan)	IRL (Republic of Ireland)	GBR (United Kingdom)	Pts

Key
Colour	Result
Gold	Winner
Silver	2nd place
Bronze	3rd place
Green	Points finish
Blue	Non-points finish
Blue	Non-classified finish (NC)
Purple	Did not finish (Ret)
Black	Excluded (EX)
Black	Disqualified (DSQ)
White	Did not start (DNS)
White	Cancelled (C)
Blank	Withdrew entry from the event (WD)

=== Manufacturers' championship ===
Rank	Manufacturer	Event																Total points
Rank	Manufacturer	MON (Monaco)	SWE (Sweden)	NOR (Norway)	MEX (Mexico)	POR (Portugal)	ARG (Argentina)	ITA (Italy)	GRC (Greece)	FIN (Finland)	GER (Germany)	NZL (New Zealand)	ESP (Spain)	FRA (France)	JPN (Japan)	IRL (Republic of Ireland)	GBR (United Kingdom)	Total points
1	BP Ford World Rally Team	10	16	18	14	9	14	18	15	-	-	-	-	-	-	-	-	114
2	Citroën Total World Rally Team	18	9	1	15	16	13	6	8	-	-	-	-	-	-	-	-	86
3	Subaru World Rally Team	8	2	5	4	8	2	5	9	-	-	-	-	-	-	-	-	43
4	Stobart VK M-Sport Ford	1	5	10	3	2	9	7	4	-	-	-	-	-	-	-	-	41
5	OMV Kronos	2	7	5	3	4	1	3	2	-	-	-	-	-	-	-	-	27
6	Munchi's Ford World Rally Team		0		0		0	0	1	-	-	-	-	-	-	-	-	1
