= 2007 Rally México =

Car rally

2007 Rally México 21º Corona Rally México
Round 4 of the 2007 World Rally Championship
← Previous event	Next event →
- Host country: Mexico
- Rally base: León, Mexico
- Dates run: March 9 – 11 2007
- Stages: 20 (366.06 km; 227.46 miles)
- Stage surface: Gravel
- Overall distance: 849.55 km (527.89 miles)

Statistics
- Crews: 47 at start, 36 at finish

Overall results
- Overall winner: (France) Sébastien Loeb (France) Citroën Total World Rally Team

The 21º Corona Rally México, the fourth round of the 2007 World Rally Championship season, took place between March 9–11 2007. The rally consisted of 20 special stages, of which five were super specials. The event was won by Citroën's Sébastien Loeb, followed by Ford drivers Marcus Grönholm and Mikko Hirvonen.

The drivers' championship leaders, Grönholm and Hirvonen, were the first drivers on road and lost time as they had to sweep the loose gravel. They were followed by Loeb, who was able to keep close to Subaru's Petter Solberg, who benefited from his better starting position during the first three stages. However, Solberg, in the new Subaru Impreza WRC 07, had to retire at the start of SS6 giving the lead to Loeb. After the first day, Ford identified and fixed a sensory fault in Grönholm's car. The problem had caused lack of engine power and troubled the Finn: "In the morning, I was sweeping. In the afternoon, I was sleeping". The second leg saw Grönholm quickly climb to second place, but Loeb continued setting top times and extended his lead to Grönholm from 43 to 60 seconds. Hirvonen, Chris Atkinson and Dani Sordo battled for the third place. Hirvonen was the fastest driver on the final day and secured the last podium position, ahead of Sordo, Atkinson, Manfred Stohl, Jari-Matti Latvala and Matthew Wilson. Loeb took the win 55.8 seconds clear of Grönholm.

== Results ==
Pos.	Driver	Co-driver	Car	Time	Difference	Points
WRC
1.	(France) Sébastien Loeb	(Monaco) Daniel Elena	Citroën C4 WRC	3:48:13.3	0.0	10
2.	(Finland) Marcus Grönholm	(Finland) Timo Rautiainen	Ford Focus RS WRC 06	3:49:09.1	55.8	8
3.	(Finland) Mikko Hirvonen	(Finland) Jarmo Lehtinen	Ford Focus RS WRC 06	3:49:41.0	1:27.7	6
4.	(Spain) Daniel Sordo	(Spain) Marc Marti	Citroën C4 WRC	3:49:57.0	1:43.7	5
5.	(Australia) Chris Atkinson	(Australia) Glenn MacNeall	Subaru Impreza WRC 07	3:50:37.4	2:24.1	4
6.	(Austria) Manfred Stohl	(Austria) Ilka Minor	Citroën Xsara WRC	3:51:58.8	3:45.5	3
7.	(Finland) Jari-Matti Latvala	(Finland) Miikka Anttila	Ford Focus RS WRC 06	3:52:24.1	4:10.8	2
8.	(United Kingdom) Matthew Wilson	(United Kingdom) Michael Orr	Ford Focus RS WRC 06	4:00:35.9	12:22.6	1
PCWRC
1. (10.)	(United Kingdom) Mark Higgins	(United Kingdom) Scott Martin	Mitsubishi Lancer Evo 9	4:08:44.5	0.0	10
2. (11.)	(Japan) Toshi Arai	(New Zealand) Tony Sircombe	Subaru Impreza WRX STI	4:10:05.4	1:20.9	8
3. (13.)	(Finland) Kristian Sohlberg	(Finland) Risto Pietiläinen	Subaru Impreza WRX STI	4:11:15.2	2:30.7	6
4. (14.)	(San Marino) Mirco Baldacci	(Italy) Giovanni Agnese	Subaru Impreza WRX STI	4:12:51.9	4:07.4	5
5. (15.)	(United States) Travis Pastrana	(United States) Christian Edstrom	Subaru Impreza WRX STI	4:16:53.2	8:08.7	4
6. (16.)	(Czech Republic) Štěpán Vojtěch	(Czech Republic) Michal Ernst	Mitsubishi Lancer Evo 9	4:25:43.3 ^{[1]}	16:58.8	3
7. (18.)	(Japan) Fumio Nutahara	(United Kingdom) Daniel Barritt	Mitsubishi Lancer Evo 9	4:26:02.5	17:18.0	2
8. (20.)	(Cyprus) Spyros Pavlides	(France) Denis Giraudet	Subaru Impreza WRX STI	4:34:23.7	25:39.2	1
				^{[1]} — Drivers using SupeRally		

== Retirements ==
- (Qatar) Nasser Al-Attiyah - mechanical (SS2/3);
- (Norway) Petter Solberg - no oil pressure (SS5/6);
- (Mexico) Francisco Name - retired between leg 1 and 2 (before SS8);
- (Estonia) Martin Rauam - gearbox failure (SS9);
- (Republic of Ireland) Gareth MacHale - damaged suspension (SS13);
- (Poland) Leszek Kuzaj - mechanical (SS13);

== Special Stages ==
All dates and times are CST (UTC-6).

Leg	Stage	Time	Name	Length	Winner	Time	Avg. spd.	Rally leader
1 (9 Mar)	SS1	08:28	Alfaro 1	23.50 km	(Norway) P. Solberg	14:03.5	100.3 km/h	(Norway) P. Solberg
1 (9 Mar)	SS2	09:51	Ortega 1	29.65 km	(Norway) P. Solberg	17:28.7	101.78 km/h	(Norway) P. Solberg
1 (9 Mar)	SS3	10:34	El Cubilete 1	17.87 km	(Norway) P. Solberg	9:45.6	109.86 km/h	(Norway) P. Solberg
1 (9 Mar)	SS4	13:02	Alfaro 2	23.50 km	(France) S. Loeb	13:47.0	102.3 km/h	(Norway) P. Solberg
1 (9 Mar)	SS5	14:25	Ortega 2	29.65 km	(Austria) M. Stohl	16:58.2	104.83 km/h	(Norway) P. Solberg
1 (9 Mar)	SS6	15:08	El Cubilete 2	17.87 km	(France) S. Loeb	9:37.5	111.4 km/h	(France) S. Loeb
1 (9 Mar)	SS7	16:29	Super Special 1	2.21 km	(Finland) M. Grönholm	1:42.6	77.54 km/h	(France) S. Loeb
1 (9 Mar)	SS8	16:33	Super Special 2	2.21 km	(Australia) C. Atkinson	1:42.0	78.0 km/h	(France) S. Loeb
2 (10 Mar)	SS9	08:19	Ibarilla 1	30.20 km	(France) S. Loeb	18:17.3	99.08 km/h	(France) S. Loeb
2 (10 Mar)	SS10	09:42	Duarte 1	23.51 km	(France) S. Loeb	17:55.0	78.73 km/h	(France) S. Loeb
2 (10 Mar)	SS11	10:33	Derramadero 1	23.27 km	(Finland) M. Grönholm	14:01.6	99.54 km/h	(France) S. Loeb
2 (10 Mar)	SS12	13:07	Ibarilla 2	30.20 km	(France) S. Loeb	18:02.6	100.42 km/h	(France) S. Loeb
2 (10 Mar)	SS13	14:30	Duarte 2	23.51 km	(Finland) M. Grönholm	17:32.2	80.48 km/h	(France) S. Loeb
2 (10 Mar)	SS14	15:21	Derramadero 2	23.27 km	(France) S. Loeb	13:49.4	101.0 km/h	(France) S. Loeb
2 (10 Mar)	SS15	16:35	Super Special 3	2.21 km	(Spain) D. Sordo	1:44.6	76.06 km/h	(France) S. Loeb
2 (10 Mar)	SS16	16:39	Super Special 4	2.21 km	(Finland) M. Grönholm	1:43.6	76.8 km/h	(France) S. Loeb
3 (11 Mar)	SS17	08:23	Leon	16.29 km	(Finland) M. Hirvonen	10:35.8	92.24 km/h	(France) S. Loeb
3 (11 Mar)	SS18	08:54	Guanajuatito	23.34 km	(Finland) M. Grönholm	15:12.3	92.1 km/h	(France) S. Loeb
3 (11 Mar)	SS19	10:17	Comanjilla	18.10 km	(Finland) M. Hirvonen	10:17.6	105.51 km/h	(France) S. Loeb
3 (11 Mar)	SS20	11:28	Super Special 5	4.42 km	(Finland) M. Grönholm	3:23.6	78.15 km/h	(France) S. Loeb

== Championship standings after the event ==
=== Drivers' championship ===
Pos	Driver	MON (Monaco)	SWE (Sweden)	NOR (Norway)	MEX (Mexico)	POR (Portugal)	ARG (Argentina)	ITA (Italy)	GRC (Greece)	FIN (Finland)	GER (Germany)	NZL (New Zealand)	ESP (Spain)	FRA (France)	JPN (Japan)	IRL (Republic of Ireland)	GBR (United Kingdom)	Pts
1	(Finland) Marcus Grönholm	3	1	2	2													32
2	(France) Sébastien Loeb	1	2	14	1													28
3	(Finland) Mikko Hirvonen	5	3	1	3													26
4	(Spain) Dani Sordo	2	12	25	4													13
5	(Norway) Henning Solberg	14	4	3	9													11
6	(Australia) Chris Atkinson	4	8	19	5													10
7	(Norway) Petter Solberg	6	Ret	4	Ret													8
8	(Sweden) Daniel Carlsson		5	7														6
8	(Finland) Jari-Matti Latvala	Ret	Ret	5	7													6
10	(Finland) Toni Gardemeister	7	6	Ret														5
10	(Austria) Manfred Stohl	10	7	12	6													5
12	(Italy) Gigi Galli		13	6														3
13	(Czech Republic) Jan Kopecký	8	10	8														2
14	(United Kingdom) Matthew Wilson	12	Ret	26	8													1
Pos	Driver	MON (Monaco)	SWE (Sweden)	NOR (Norway)	MEX (Mexico)	POR (Portugal)	ARG (Argentina)	ITA (Italy)	GRC (Greece)	FIN (Finland)	GER (Germany)	NZL (New Zealand)	ESP (Spain)	FRA (France)	JPN (Japan)	IRL (Republic of Ireland)	GBR (United Kingdom)	Pts

Key
Colour	Result
Gold	Winner
Silver	2nd place
Bronze	3rd place
Green	Points finish
Blue	Non-points finish
Blue	Non-classified finish (NC)
Purple	Did not finish (Ret)
Black	Excluded (EX)
Black	Disqualified (DSQ)
White	Did not start (DNS)
White	Cancelled (C)
Blank	Withdrew entry from the event (WD)

=== Manufacturers' championship ===
Rank	Manufacturer	Event																Total points
Rank	Manufacturer	MON (Monaco)	SWE (Sweden)	NOR (Norway)	MEX (Mexico)	POR (Portugal)	ARG (Argentina)	ITA (Italy)	GRC (Greece)	FIN (Finland)	GER (Germany)	NZL (New Zealand)	ESP (Spain)	FRA (France)	JPN (Japan)	IRL (Republic of Ireland)	GBR (United Kingdom)	Total points
1	BP Ford World Rally Team	10	16	18	14	-	-	-	-	-	-	-	-	-	-	-	-	58
2	Citroën Total World Rally Team	18	9	1	15	-	-	-	-	-	-	-	-	-	-	-	-	43
3	Stobart VK M-Sport Ford	1	5	10	3	-	-	-	-	-	-	-	-	-	-	-	-	19
3	Subaru World Rally Team	8	2	5	4	-	-	-	-	-	-	-	-	-	-	-	-	19
5	OMV Kronos	2	7	5	3	-	-	-	-	-	-	-	-	-	-	-	-	17
6	Munchi's Ford World Rally Team		0		0	-	-	-	-	-	-	-	-	-	-	-	-	0
