= Kronos Racing =

Rallying team competing in international rallies

(Belgium) Kronos Racing
- Full name: Kronos Racing
- Base: Naninne, Belgium
- Technical director: Marc Van Dalen (CEO)

World Rally Championship history
- Debut: 2004
- Manufacturers' Championships: 0
- Drivers' Championships: 1 (2006)
- Rally wins: 8

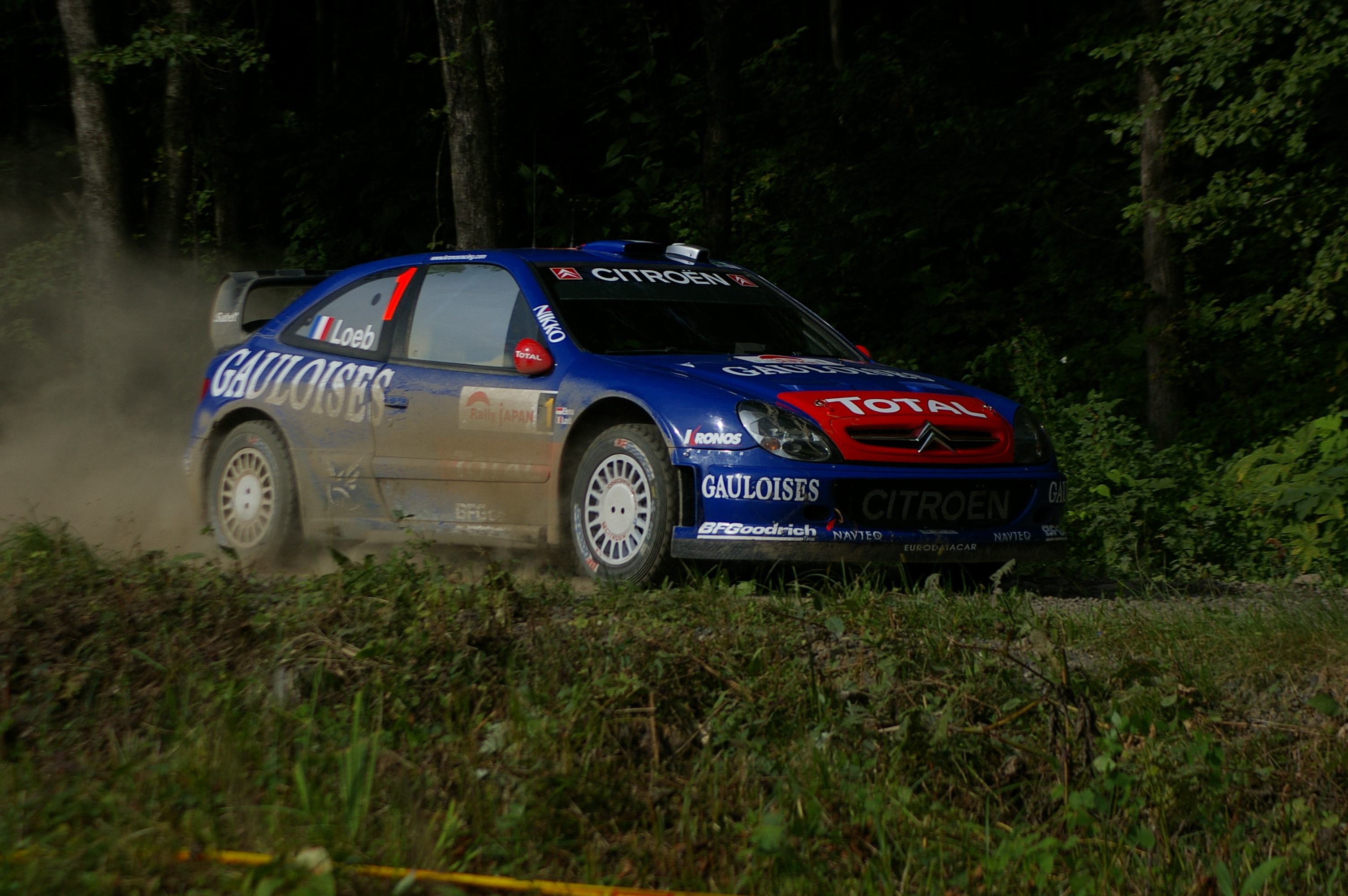
Sébastien Loeb driving for Kronos Racing at the 2006 Rally Japan.

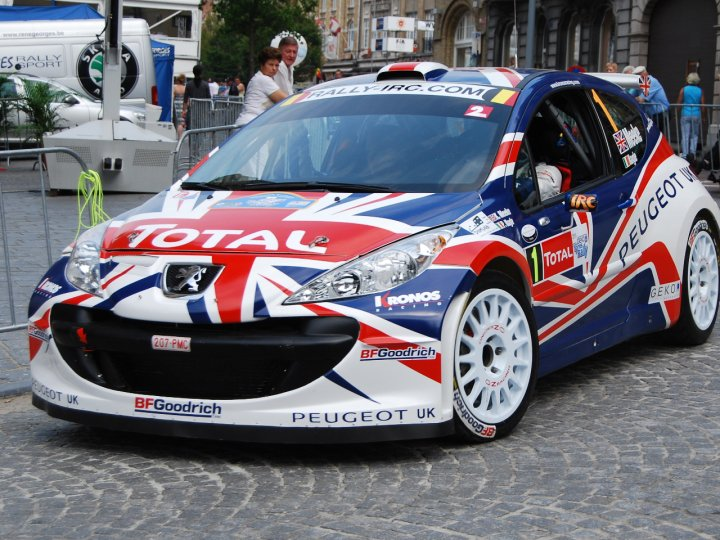
Kris Meeke during the 2010 Ypres Rally.

Kronos Racing is a Belgian auto racing and rally team.

== History ==
Kronos Racing was set up in 1994, and ran circuit racing and rallying programmes on behalf of Peugeot Belgium/Luxembourg. The team's Peugeot 306 GTIs won the Spa 24 Hours in 1999 and 2000, the last two years that the event was run as a touring car race. In 2003 Bruno Thiry won the European Rally Championship in a Peugeot 206 WRC run by the team. In 2004, Citroën Sport chose Kronos to run their programme in the Junior World Rally Championship, extending their partnership with the PSA Group. Dani Sordo won the JWRC in 2005 while driving for the team, while Manfred Stohl scored overall two podium finishes driving a Kronos-run Citroën Xsara WRC.

In 2006 Citroën took a year out of the WRC to develop the C4 WRC, and therefore used Kronos to enter Xsara WRCs under the Kronos Total Citroën World Rally Team banner. Sébastien Loeb took his third Drivers' title for Citroën thanks to Kronos, beating the Ford World Rally Team and driver Marcus Grönholm. Kronos also ran Xavier Pons and Sordo, while Colin McRae drove on one event as a stand-in for the injured Loeb.

In 2007 Kronos continued to run Xsaras in the WRC, mainly for Stohl. In addition, Kronos began competing in the Intercontinental Rally Challenge with Peugeot, winning the title in 2008 with Nicolas Vouilloz. In 2009, Kris Meeke won the title for Peugeot UK, his car run by Kronos.

=== WRC Results ===
Year	Car	No	Driver	1	2	3	4	5	6	7	8	9	10	11	12	13	14	15	16	WDC	Points	TC	Points
2004	Citroën Xsara WRC	15	(Finland) Juuso Pykälistö	MON	SWE	MEX	NZL	CYP	GRE	TUR	ARG	FIN; Ret	GER	JPN	GBR	ITA; Ret	FRA	ESP	AUS	-	0	-	-
2005	Citroën Xsara WRC	16	(Austria) Manfred Stohl	MON; 6	SWE	MEX	NZL; 9	ITA; 9	CYP; 2	TUR	GRE; 20	ARG; 8	FIN; Ret	GER; Ret	GBR; 5	JPN	FRA	ESP	AUS; 3	9th	22	-	-
2005	Citroën Xsara WRC	17	(Spain) Xavier Pons	MON	SWE	MEX	NZL	ITA	CYP	TUR	GRE; 10	ARG; 10	FIN; 12	GER; 9	GBR; 11	JPN	FRA; 7	ESP; 4	AUS; Ret	15th	7	-	-
2005	Citroën Xsara WRC	21	(Finland) Juuso Pykälistö	MON	SWE	MEX	NZL	ITA; 8	CYP	TUR	GRE	ARG	FIN	GER	GBR	JPN	FRA	ESP	AUS	27th	1	-	-
2006	Citroën Xsara WRC	1	(France) Sébastien Loeb	MON; 2	SWE; 2	MEX; 1	ESP; 1	FRA; 1	ARG; 1	ITA; 1	GRE; 2	DEU; 1	FIN; 2	JPN; 1	CYP; 1					1st	112	2nd	166
2006	Citroën Xsara WRC	1	(Scotland) Colin McRae													TUR; Ret				-	0	2nd	166
2006	Citroën Xsara WRC	1	(Spain) Xavier Pons														AUS; 4	NZL; 4	GBR; 5	7th	32	2nd	166
2006	Citroën Xsara WRC	2	(Spain) Xavier Pons	MON; 9	SWE; 7	MEX; Ret	ESP; Ret	FRA; 6	ARG; 17	ITA; 4	GRE; 8									7th	32	2nd	166
2006	Citroën Xsara WRC	2	(Spain) Dani Sordo									DEU; 2	FIN; Ret	JPN; DSQ	CYP; Ret	TUR; 7	AUS; 23	NZL; 5	GBR; 7	5th	49	2nd	166
2006	Citroën Xsara WRC	14	(Spain) Dani Sordo	MON; 8	SWE; 16	MEX; 4	ESP; 2	FRA; 3	ARG; 5	ITA; 3	GRE; 6									5th	49	2nd	166
2006	Citroën Xsara WRC	14	(Spain) Xavier Pons									DEU; 14	FIN; Ret	JPN; DNS	CYP; 7	TUR; 4				7th	32	2nd	166
2007	Citroën Xsara WRC	5	(Austria) Manfred Stohl	MON; 10	SWE; 7	NOR; 12	MEX; 6	POR; 9	ARG; 8	ITA; 7	GRE; 8	FIN; Ret	GER; Ret	NZL; 12	ESP; Ret	FRA; 14	JPN; 6	IRE; Ret	GBR; 8	9th	13	5th	45
2007	Citroën Xsara WRC	6	(Sweden) Daniel Carlsson	MON	SWE; 5	NOR; 7	MEX	POR; 6	ARG	ITA; Ret	GRE	FIN								14th	9	5th	45
2007	Citroën Xsara WRC	6	(Belgium) François Duval										GER; 2	NZL	ESP; 5	FRA; Ret	JPN	IRE	GBR	10th	12	5th	45

=== IRC results ===
Year	Car	Entrant	Driver	1	2	3	4	5	6	7	8	9	10	11	12	WDC	Points
2007	Peugeot 207 S2000	(Spain) Peugeot Sport España	(Spain) Enrique García Ojeda	KEN	TUR; 3	BEL; 2	RUS; 2	POR; 4	CZE; 2	ITA; 6	SWI; 2	CHI				1st	47
2007	Peugeot 207 S2000	(Spain) Peugeot Sport España	(France) Nicolas Vouilloz	KEN	TUR; 1	BEL; Ret	RUS; 3	POR; 9	CZE; 1	ITA; 3	SWI; 1	CHI				2nd	42
2007	Peugeot 207 S2000	(Belgium) Peugeot Team Belux	(Belgium) Bernd Casier	KEN	TUR	BEL; 4	RUS	POR; 5	CZE; 5	ITA; 14	SWI; Ret	CHI				8th	13
2008	Peugeot 207 S2000	(Belgium) Peugeot Team Bel-Lux	(France) Nicolas Vouilloz	TUR; 2	POR; 3	BEL; 2	RUS; 5	POR; 1	CZE; 2	ESP; 2	ITA; 2	SWI; 2	CHI			1st	68
2008	Peugeot 207 S2000	(Belgium) Peugeot Team Bel-Lux	(Belgium) Freddy Loix	IST; 8	POR; Ret	YPR; 1	RUS; 4	MAD; 6	ZLI; 1	AST; 3	SAN; 5	VAL; 1	CHN			2nd	48
2008	Peugeot 207 S2000	(France) BF Goodrich Drivers Team	(Portugal) Miguel Campos	IST	POR; Ret											-	0
2008	Peugeot 207 S2000	(France) BF Goodrich Drivers Team	(Belgium) Patrick Snijers			YPR; 5	RUS	MAD								18th	4
2008	Peugeot 207 S2000	(France) BF Goodrich Drivers Team	(Czech Republic) Pavel Valoušek						ZLI; 4							15th	5
2008	Peugeot 207 S2000	(France) BF Goodrich Drivers Team	(Spain) Sergio Vallejo							AST; 7						28th	2
2008	Peugeot 207 S2000	(France) BF Goodrich Drivers Team	(Italy) Andrea Torlasco								SAN; 9	VAL	CHN			-	0
2009	Peugeot 207 S2000	(United Kingdom) Peugeot UK	(United Kingdom) Kris Meeke	MON; Ret	CUR; 1	KEN	AZO; 1	BEL; 1	RUS	POR; 5	CZE; 2	ESP; 2	ITA; 1	SCO; DSQ		1st	66
2009	Peugeot 207 S2000	(Belgium) Peugeot Team Belux	(Belgium) Freddy Loix	MON; 2	CUR; 4	KEN	AZO; 4	YPR; 3	RUS	MAD; 6	ZLI; Ret	AST; 6	ITA; 4	SCO		3rd	37
2009	Peugeot 207 S2000	(Belgium) Peugeot Team Belux	(France) Nicolas Vouilloz	MON; Ret	CUR; 2	KEN	AZO; 3	BEL; Ret	RUS	POR; 4	CZE; Ret	ESP; 3	ITA; 3	SCO		4th	31
2009	Peugeot 207 S2000	(Belgium) Peugeot Team Belux	(Belgium) Pieter Tsjoen	MON	CUR	KEN	AZO	YPR; 4	RUS	MAD	ZLI	AST	ITA	SCO		19th	5
2009	Peugeot 207 S2000	(France) BF Goodrich Drivers Team	(France) Sébastien Ogier	MON; 1	CUR	KEN	AZO									8th	10
2009	Peugeot 207 S2000	(France) BF Goodrich Drivers Team	(Belgium) Thierry Neuville					BEL; Ret	RUS	POR						-	0
2009	Peugeot 207 S2000	(France) BF Goodrich Drivers Team	(Czech Republic) Martin Prokop								CZE; 5	ESP				24th	4
2009	Peugeot 207 S2000	(France) BF Goodrich Drivers Team	(Italy) Luca Cantamessa										ITA; 7			37th	2
2009	Peugeot 207 S2000	(France) BF Goodrich Drivers Team	(United Kingdom) Adam Gould											SCO; Ret		-	0
2010	Peugeot 207 S2000	(United Kingdom) Peugeot UK	(United Kingdom) Kris Meeke	MON; Ret	BRA; 1	ARG; Ret	CAN; 4	ITA; Ret	BEL; Ret	AZO; 2	MAD; Ret	CZE; 4	ITA; 4	SCO; 3	CYP	3rd	39
2010	Peugeot 207 S2000	(Belgium) Peugeot Team Bel-Lux	(Belgium) Thierry Neuville	MON	BRA	ARG	CAN; Ret	ITA; 4	BEL; 3	AZO	MAD	CZE; Ret	ITA; 8	SCO; Ret	CYP	9th	12
2011	Peugeot 207 S2000	(Belgium) Peugeot Team Bel-Lux	(Belgium) Thierry Neuville	MON; Ret	CAN; 3	COR; 1	YAL; 6	YPR; Ret	AZO	ZLI; 4	MEC; 2	SAN; 1	SCO; 6	CYP; Ret		5th	115
2011	Peugeot 207 S2000	(United Kingdom) Peugeot UK	(United Kingdom) Guy Wilks	MON; 3	CAN; 5	COR; Ret	YAL; 5	YPR; 4	AZO; Ret	ZLI; Ret	MEC; Ret	SAN; Ret	SCO; Ret	CYP		7th	47
