= 2007 Rally New Zealand =

2007 Rally New Zealand 37th Propecia Rally New Zealand
Round 11 of the 2007 World Rally Championship
← Previous event	Next event →
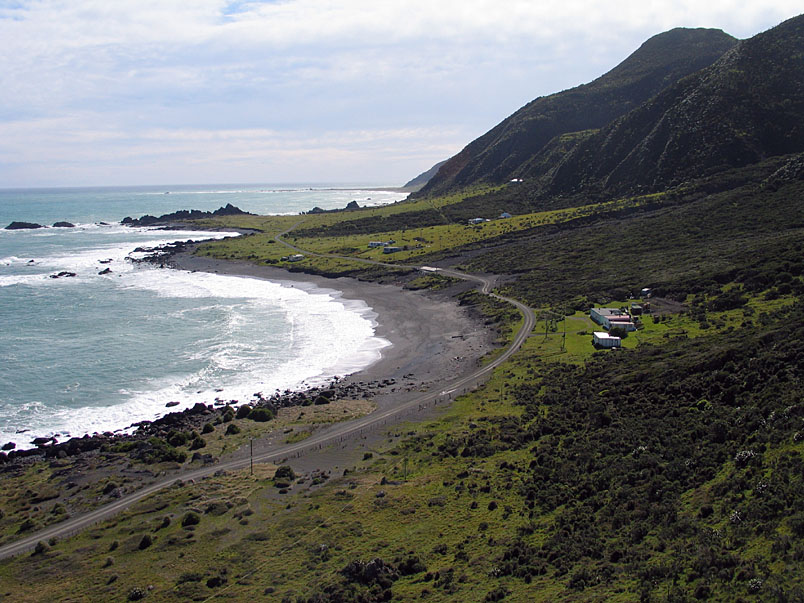
- Coast of New Zealand.
- Host country: New Zealand
- Rally base: Hamilton, New Zealand
- Dates run: 31 August – 2 September 2007
- Stages: 18 (353.56 km; 219.69 miles)
- Stage surface: Gravel
- Overall distance: 1,255.98 km (780.43 miles)

Statistics
- Crews: 68 at start, 59 at finish

Overall results
- Overall winner: (Finland) Marcus Grönholm (United Kingdom) BP Ford World Rally Team

The 2007 Rally New Zealand (37th Propecia Rally New Zealand), 11th round of 2007 World Rally Championship, was run on 31 August to 2 September. After a tight battle for three days, Marcus Grönholm beat Sébastien Loeb for the win by 0.3 seconds, making it the second-closest finish in WRC history (after 2011 Jordan Rally's 0.2s). This was the closest finish in the history of the World Rally Championship. The previous record was held by the 1998 Rally de Portugal, in which Colin McRae took the win 2.1 seconds ahead of Carlos Sainz.

== Results ==
Pos.	Driver	Co-driver	Car	Time	Difference	Points
WRC
1.	(Finland) Marcus Grönholm	(Finland) Timo Rautiainen	Ford Focus RS WRC 07	3:52:53.9	0.0	10
2.	(France) Sébastien Loeb	(Monaco) Daniel Elena	Citroën C4 WRC	3:52:54.2	0.3	8
3.	(Finland) Mikko Hirvonen	(Finland) Jarmo Lehtinen	Ford Focus RS WRC 07	3:54:36.7	1:42.8	6
4.	(Australia) Chris Atkinson	(Belgium) Stéphane Prévot	Subaru Impreza WRC 07	3:55:26.2	2:32.3	5
5.	(Finland) Jari-Matti Latvala	(Finland) Ole Kristian Unnerud	Ford Focus RS WRC 06	3:55:30.8	2:36.9	4
6.	(Spain) Daniel Sordo	(Spain) Marc Marti	Citroën C4 WRC	3:56:35.9	3:42.0	3
7.	(Norway) Petter Solberg	(United Kingdom) Phil Mills	Subaru Impreza WRC 07	3:56:48.6	3:54.7	2
8.	(Estonia) Urmo Aava	(Estonia) Kuldar Sikk	Mitsubishi Lancer WR05	4:02:10.2	9:16.3	1
PCWRC
1. (13.)	(Japan) Toshi Arai	(New Zealand) Tony Sircombe	Subaru Impreza WRX STI	4:13:35.8	0.0	10
2. (14.)	(United Kingdom) Niall McShea	(United Kingdom) Gordon Noble	Subaru Impreza WRX STI	4:13:38.4	2.6	8
3. (15.)	(New Zealand) Richard Mason	(New Zealand) Sara Randall	Subaru Impreza WRX STI	4:14:46.0	1:10.2	6
4. (16.)	(Argentina) Gabriel Pozzo	(Argentina) Daniel Stillo	Mitsubishi Lancer Evo 9	4:14:48.9	1:13.1	5
5. (17.)	(Japan) Fumio Nutahara	(United Kingdom) Daniel Barritt	Mitsubishi Lancer Evo 9	4:14:55.7	1:19.9	4
6. (18.)	(Portugal) Armindo Araujo	(Portugal) Miguel Ramalho	Mitsubishi Lancer Evo 9	4:15:16.0	1:40.2	3
7. (19.)	(Finland) Juho Hänninen	(Finland) Mikko Markkula	Mitsubishi Lancer Evo 9	4:15:46.9	2:11.1	2
8. (22.)	(Estonia) Martin Rauam	(Estonia) Kristo Kraag	Mitsubishi Lancer Evo 9	4:16:15.2	2:39.4	1

== Special Stages ==
All dates and times are NZST (UTC+12).

Leg	Stage	Time	Name	Length	Winner	Time	Avg. spd.	Rally leader
1 (31 Aug)	SS1	09:18	Pirongia West 1	18.30 km	(Finland) M. Grönholm	13:40.5	80.29 km/h	(Finland) M. Grönholm
1 (31 Aug)	SS2	10:21	Waitomo 1	43.88 km	(Finland) M. Grönholm	28:47.8	91.43 km/h	(Finland) M. Grönholm
1 (31 Aug)	SS3	14:07	Pirongia West 2	18.30 km	(France) S. Loeb	13:32.4	81.09 km/h	(Finland) M. Grönholm
1 (31 Aug)	SS4	15:10	Waitomo 2	43.88 km	(France) S. Loeb	28:20.4	92.9 km/h	(Finland) M. Grönholm
1 (31 Aug)	SS5	17:03	Mystery Creek 1	3.14 km	(Australia) C. Atkinson	2:56.2	64.15 km/h	(Finland) M. Grönholm
2 (1 Sep)	SS6	09:03	Port Waikato	17.21 km	(France) S. Loeb	9:33.2	108.09 km/h	(Finland) M. Grönholm
2 (1 Sep)	SS7	09:41	Possum	13.88 km	(Finland) M. Grönholm	10:38.2	78.3 km/h	(Finland) M. Grönholm
2 (1 Sep)	SS8	10:19	Franklin	31.57 km	(France) S. Loeb	21:15.7	89.09 km/h	(Finland) M. Grönholm
2 (1 Sep)	SS9	12:32	Mystery Creek 2	3.14 km	(Finland) M. Grönholm	2:54.7	64.71 km/h	(Finland) M. Grönholm
2 (1 Sep)	SS10	14:58	Te Akau South	31.92 km	(France) S. Loeb	18:25.0	103.99 km/h	(Finland) M. Grönholm
2 (1 Sep)	SS11	15:41	Te Akau North	32.36 km	(France) S. Loeb	16:59.8	114.23 km/h	(France) S. Loeb
3 (2 Sep)	SS12	09:03	Maungatawhiri 1	5.34 km	(Finland) M. Grönholm	2:41.3	119.18 km/h	(Finland) M. Grönholm
3 (2 Sep)	SS13	09:31	Te Hutewai 1	11.22 km	(France) S. Loeb	7:54.3	85.16 km/h	(France) S. Loeb
3 (2 Sep)	SS14	09:59	Whaanga Coast 1	29.81 km	(France) S. Loeb	21:00.8	85.12 km/h	(France) S. Loeb
3 (2 Sep)	SS15	11:38	Maungatawhiri 2	5.34 km	(Finland) M. Grönholm	2:39.7	120.38 km/h	(France) S. Loeb
3 (2 Sep)	SS16	12:06	Te Hutewai 2	11.22 km	(Finland) M. Grönholm	7:43.0	87.24 km/h	(France) S. Loeb
3 (2 Sep)	SS17	12:34	Whaanga Coast 2	29.81 km	(Finland) M. Grönholm	20:32.1	87.1 km/h	(Finland) M. Grönholm
3 (2 Sep)	SS18	14:18	Mystery Creek 3	3.14 km	(France) S. Loeb	2:52.5	65.53 km/h	(Finland) M. Grönholm

== Championship standings after the event ==
=== Drivers' championship ===
Pos	Driver	MON (Monaco)	SWE (Sweden)	NOR (Norway)	MEX (Mexico)	POR (Portugal)	ARG (Argentina)	ITA (Italy)	GRC (Greece)	FIN (Finland)	GER (Germany)	NZL (New Zealand)	ESP (Spain)	FRA (France)	JPN (Japan)	IRL (Republic of Ireland)	GBR (United Kingdom)	Pts
1	(Finland) Marcus Grönholm	3	1	2	2	4	2	1	1	1	4	1						90
2	(France) Sébastien Loeb	1	2	14	1	1	1	Ret	2	3	1	2						80
3	(Finland) Mikko Hirvonen	5	3	1	3	5	3	2	4	2	3	3						69
4	(Spain) Dani Sordo	2	12	25	4	3	6	3	24	Ret	Ret	6						31
4	(Norway) Petter Solberg	6	Ret	4	Ret	2	Ret	5	3	Ret	6	7						31
6	(Norway) Henning Solberg	14	4	3	9	9	5	4	5	5	14	9						28
7	(Australia) Chris Atkinson	4	8	19	5	Ret	7	10	6	4	15	4						25
8	(Finland) Jari-Matti Latvala	Ret	Ret	5	7	8	4	9	12	Ret	8	5						17
9	(Finland) Toni Gardemeister	7	6	Ret		DSQ		6			7							10
10	(Sweden) Daniel Carlsson		5	7		6		Ret										9
10	(Austria) Manfred Stohl	10	7	12	6	10	8	7	8	Ret	Ret	12						9
12	(Belgium) François Duval								Ret		2							8
12	(Czech Republic) Jan Kopecký	8	10	8		22		Ret	7	Ret	5							8
14	(Italy) Gigi Galli		13	6		7												5
15	(Spain) Xavier Pons	25	Ret	16						6	18	Ret						3
15	(Estonia) Urmo Aava			28		15		13	14	7	12	8						3
17	(United Kingdom) Matthew Wilson	12	Ret	26	8	12	30	12	10	10	9	10						1
17	(Finland) Juho Hänninen		DSQ	17			11	8	Ret	Ret		19						1
17	(Norway) Mads Østberg		9	37		Ret		Ret		8								1
Pos	Driver	MON (Monaco)	SWE (Sweden)	NOR (Norway)	MEX (Mexico)	POR (Portugal)	ARG (Argentina)	ITA (Italy)	GRC (Greece)	FIN (Finland)	GER (Germany)	NZL (New Zealand)	ESP (Spain)	FRA (France)	JPN (Japan)	IRL (Republic of Ireland)	GBR (United Kingdom)	Pts

Key
Colour	Result
Gold	Winner
Silver	2nd place
Bronze	3rd place
Green	Points finish
Blue	Non-points finish
Blue	Non-classified finish (NC)
Purple	Did not finish (Ret)
Black	Excluded (EX)
Black	Disqualified (DSQ)
White	Did not start (DNS)
White	Cancelled (C)
Blank	Withdrew entry from the event (WD)

=== Manufacturers' championship ===
Rank	Manufacturer	Event																Total points
Rank	Manufacturer	MON (Monaco)	SWE (Sweden)	NOR (Norway)	MEX (Mexico)	POR (Portugal)	ARG (Argentina)	ITA (Italy)	GRC (Greece)	FIN (Finland)	GER (Germany)	NZL (New Zealand)	ESP (Spain)	FRA (France)	JPN (Japan)	IRL (Republic of Ireland)	GBR (United Kingdom)	Total points
1	BP Ford World Rally Team	10	16	18	14	9	14	18	15	18	11	16	-	-	-	-	-	159
2	Citroën Total World Rally Team	18	9	1	15	16	13	6	8	6	10	11	-	-	-	-	-	113
3	Subaru World Rally Team	8	2	5	4	8	2	5	9	5	5	7	-	-	-	-	-	60
4	Stobart VK M-Sport Ford	1	5	10	3	2	9	7	4	4	5	5	-	-	-	-	-	55
5	OMV Kronos	2	7	5	3	4	1	3	2	0	8	0	-	-	-	-	-	35
6	Munchi's Ford World Rally Team		0		0		0	0	1	5		0	-	-	-	-	-	6
