= 2007 Rally Norway =

Rallying motorsport event

2007 Rally Norway 2nd Rally Norway
Round 3 of the 2007 World Rally Championship
← Previous event	Next event →
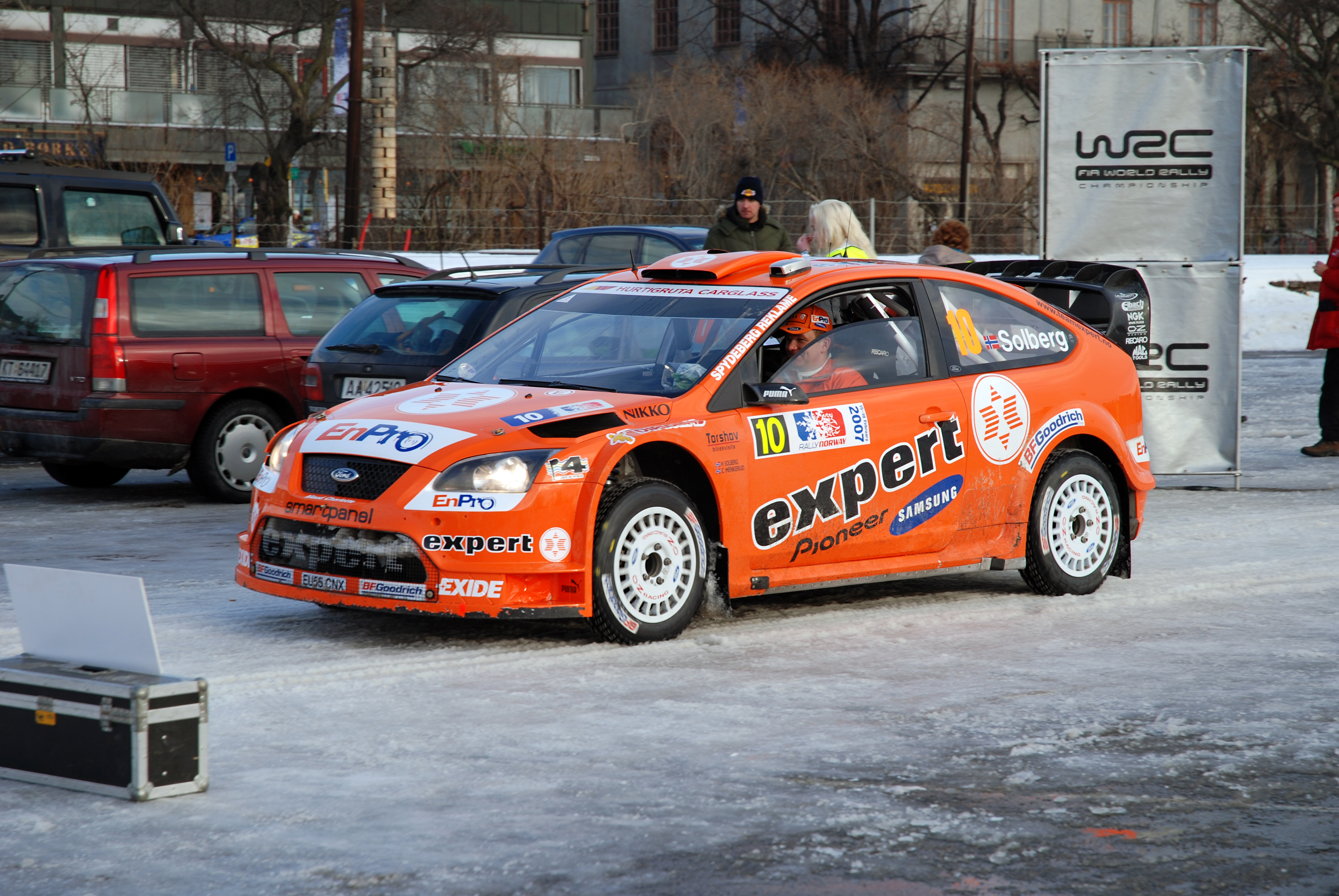
- Henning Solberg driving his Ford Focus RS WRC 06.
- Host country: Norway
- Rally base: Hamar, Norway
- Dates run: February 16 – 18 2007
- Stages: 18 (358.72 km; 222.90 miles)
- Stage surface: Ice/snow-covered gravel
- Overall distance: 1,127.61 km (700.66 miles)

Statistics
- Crews: 74 at start, 64 at finish

Overall results
- Overall winner: (Finland) Mikko Hirvonen (United Kingdom) BP Ford World Rally Team

Rally Norway 2007, the third round of the 2007 World Rally Championship season, was held on February 16 – 18 2007. Race headquarters were located in the town of Hamar.

== Results ==
Pos.	Driver	Co-driver	Car	Time	Difference	Points
WRC
1.	(Finland) Mikko Hirvonen	(Finland) Jarmo Lehtinen	Ford Focus RS WRC 06	3:28:17.0	0.0	10
2.	(Finland) Marcus Grönholm	(Finland) Timo Rautiainen	Ford Focus RS WRC 06	3:28:26.5	9.5	8
3.	(Norway) Henning Solberg	(Norway) Cato Menkerud	Ford Focus RS WRC 06	3:32:01.6	3:44.6	6
4.	(Norway) Petter Solberg	(United Kingdom) Phil Mills	Subaru Impreza WRC06	3:32:18.1	4:01.1	5
5.	(Finland) Jari-Matti Latvala	(Finland) Miikka Anttila	Ford Focus RS WRC 06	3:33:47.7	5:30.7	4
6.	(Italy) Gian-Luigi Galli	(Italy) Giovanni Bernacchini	Citroën Xsara WRC	3:35:22.2	7:05.2	3
7.	(Sweden) Daniel Carlsson	(France) Denis Giraudet	Citroën Xsara WRC	3:37:40.7	9:23.7	2
8.	(Czech Republic) Jan Kopecký	(Czech Republic) Filip Schovánek	Škoda Fabia WRC	3:40:06.9	11:49.9	1
J-WRC
1. (18.)	(Sweden) Per-Gunner Andersson	(Sweden) Jonas Andersson	Suzuki Swift S1600	3:49:37.9	0.0	10
2. (21.)	(Sweden) Patrik Sandell	(Sweden) Emil Axelsson	Renault Clio R3	3:57:11.6	7:33.7	8
3. (28.)	(Estonia) Urmo Aava	(Estonia) Kuldar Sikk	Suzuki Swift S1600	4:04:50.3 ^{[1]}	15:12.4	6
4. (31.)	(Estonia) Jaan Mölder jr.	(Germany) Katrin Becker	Suzuki Swift S1600	4:08:41.0	19:03.1	5
5. (38.)	(Germany) Aaron Burkart	(Germany) Timo Gottschalk	Citroën C2 S1600	4:13:22.6	23:44.7	4
6. (39.)	(Norway) Trond Svenkerud	(Norway) Kay Ødegård	Ford Fiesta ST	4:18:03.9	28:26.0	3
7. (41.)	(Italy) Andrea Cortinovis	(Italy) Flavio Zanella	Renault Clio S1600	4:19:02.9 ^{[1]}	29:25.0	2
8. (44.)	(Republic of Ireland) Shaun Gallagher	(United Kingdom) Clive Jenkins	Citroën C2 R2	4:25:57.8	36:19.9	1
				^{[1]} — Drivers using SupeRally		

== Retirements ==
- (United Kingdom) Guy Wilks - went off the road (SS9);
- (Finland) Toni Gardemeister - engine failure (after SS14);

== Special Stages ==
All dates and times are CET (UTC+1).

Leg	Stage	Time	Name	Length	Winner	Time	Avg. spd.	Rally leader
1 (16 Feb)	SS1	07:43	Loten 1	30.30 km	(Finland) M. Hirvonen	16:14.1	111.98 km/h	(Finland) M. Hirvonen
1 (16 Feb)	SS2	08:34	Haslemoen	11.92 km	(France) S. Loeb	8:08.4	87.86 km/h	(Finland) M. Hirvonen
1 (16 Feb)	SS3	11:24	Loten 2	30.30 km	(Finland) M. Hirvonen	16:09.9	112.47 km/h	(Finland) M. Hirvonen
1 (16 Feb)	SS4	12:30	Grue	14.36 km	(France) S. Loeb	7:31.8	114.42 km/h	(Finland) M. Hirvonen
1 (16 Feb)	SS5	13:52	Opaker	14.64 km	(Finland) J. Latvala	7:59.8	109.85 km/h	(Finland) M. Hirvonen
1 (16 Feb)	SS6	14:36	Kongsvinger	14.60 km	(France) S. Loeb	9:44.5	89.92 km/h	(Finland) M. Hirvonen
1 (16 Feb)	SS7	15:30	Finnskogen	21.29 km	(France) S. Loeb	12:42.3	100.54 km/h	(Finland) M. Hirvonen
1 (16 Feb)	SS8	16:33	Kirkanaer	6.75 km	(France) S. Loeb	5:48.9	69.65 km/h	(Finland) M. Hirvonen
2 (17 Feb)	SS9	08:09	Elverum 1	44.27 km	(Finland) M. Hirvonen	24:40.3	107.66 km/h	(Finland) M. Hirvonen
2 (17 Feb)	SS10	09:23	Terningmoen	12.71 km	(Spain) D. Sordo	7:59.1	95.5 km/h	(Finland) M. Hirvonen
2 (17 Feb)	SS11	12:05	Mountain 1	24.36 km	(Finland) M. Hirvonen	14:01.8	104.18 km/h	(Finland) M. Hirvonen
2 (17 Feb)	SS12	13:06	Lillehammar	5.98 km	(Finland) M. Grönholm	4:33.9	78.6 km/h	(Finland) M. Hirvonen
2 (17 Feb)	SS13	14:00	Ringsaker 1	27.30 km	(Finland) M. Grönholm	16:29.7	99.3 km/h	(Finland) M. Hirvonen
2 (17 Feb)	SS14	15:10	Hamar 1	1.14 km	(Finland) M. Grönholm	1:13.8	55.61 km/h	(Finland) M. Hirvonen
3 (18 Feb)	SS15	08:08	Mountain 2	24.36 km	(France) S. Loeb	13:18.2	109.87 km/h	(Finland) M. Hirvonen
3 (18 Feb)	SS16	08:55	Ringsaker 2	27.30 km	(Norway) H. Solberg	15:28.6	105.84 km/h	(Finland) M. Hirvonen
3 (18 Feb)	SS17	10:05	Hamar 2	1.14 km	(Spain) X. Pons (France) S. Loeb (Norway) P. Solberg	1:11.8	57.16 km/h	(Finland) M. Hirvonen
3 (18 Feb)	SS18	12:14	Elverum 2	44.27 km	(Finland) M. Grönholm	24:10.3	109.89 km/h	(Finland) M. Hirvonen

== Championship standings after the event ==
=== Drivers' championship ===
Pos	Driver	MON (Monaco)	SWE (Sweden)	NOR (Norway)	MEX (Mexico)	POR (Portugal)	ARG (Argentina)	ITA (Italy)	GRC (Greece)	FIN (Finland)	GER (Germany)	NZL (New Zealand)	ESP (Spain)	FRA (France)	JPN (Japan)	IRL (Republic of Ireland)	GBR (United Kingdom)	Pts
1	(Finland) Marcus Grönholm	3	1	2														24
2	(Finland) Mikko Hirvonen	5	3	1														20
3	(France) Sébastien Loeb	1	2	14														18
4	(Norway) Henning Solberg	14	4	3														11
5	(Spain) Dani Sordo	2	12	25														8
5	(Norway) Petter Solberg	6	Ret	4														8
7	(Australia) Chris Atkinson	4	8	19														6
7	(Sweden) Daniel Carlsson		5	7														6
9	(Finland) Toni Gardemeister	7	6	Ret														5
10	(Finland) Jari-Matti Latvala	Ret	Ret	5														4
11	(Italy) Gigi Galli		13	6														3
12	(Austria) Manfred Stohl	10	7	12														2
12	(Czech Republic) Jan Kopecký	8	10	8														2
Pos	Driver	MON (Monaco)	SWE (Sweden)	NOR (Norway)	MEX (Mexico)	POR (Portugal)	ARG (Argentina)	ITA (Italy)	GRC (Greece)	FIN (Finland)	GER (Germany)	NZL (New Zealand)	ESP (Spain)	FRA (France)	JPN (Japan)	IRL (Republic of Ireland)	GBR (United Kingdom)	Pts

Key
Colour	Result
Gold	Winner
Silver	2nd place
Bronze	3rd place
Green	Points finish
Blue	Non-points finish
Blue	Non-classified finish (NC)
Purple	Did not finish (Ret)
Black	Excluded (EX)
Black	Disqualified (DSQ)
White	Did not start (DNS)
White	Cancelled (C)
Blank	Withdrew entry from the event (WD)

=== Manufacturers' championship ===
Rank	Manufacturer	Event																Total points
Rank	Manufacturer	MON (Monaco)	SWE (Sweden)	NOR (Norway)	MEX (Mexico)	POR (Portugal)	ARG (Argentina)	ITA (Italy)	GRC (Greece)	FIN (Finland)	GER (Germany)	NZL (New Zealand)	ESP (Spain)	FRA (France)	JPN (Japan)	IRL (Republic of Ireland)	GBR (United Kingdom)	Total points
1	BP Ford World Rally Team	10	16	18	-	-	-	-	-	-	-	-	-	-	-	-	-	44
2	Citroën Total World Rally Team	18	9	1	-	-	-	-	-	-	-	-	-	-	-	-	-	28
3	Stobart VK M-Sport Ford	1	5	10	-	-	-	-	-	-	-	-	-	-	-	-	-	16
4	Subaru World Rally Team	8	2	5	-	-	-	-	-	-	-	-	-	-	-	-	-	15
5	OMV Kronos	2	7	5	-	-	-	-	-	-	-	-	-	-	-	-	-	14
6	Munchi's Ford World Rally Team		0		-	-	-	-	-	-	-	-	-	-	-	-	-	0
