= 2007 Rallye Deutschland =

Rallying motorsport event

2007 Rallye Deutschland: 26. ADAC Rallye Deutschland
Round 10 of the 2007 World Rally Championship
← Previous event	Next event →
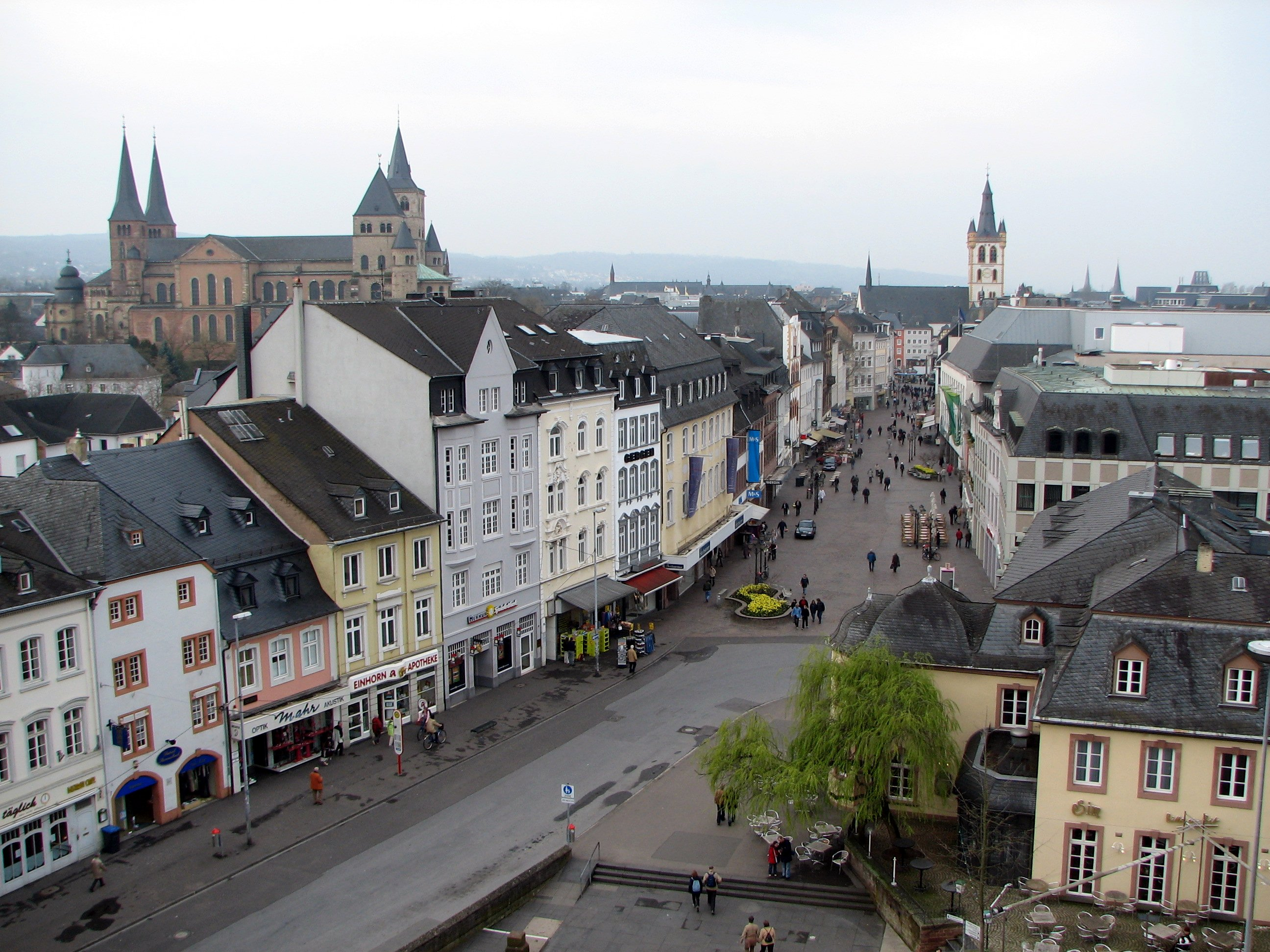
- View of Trier, rally base.
- Host country: Germany
- Rally base: Trier, Germany
- Dates run: August 17 – 19 2007
- Stages: 19 (356.27 km; 221.38 miles)
- Stage surface: Asphalt
- Overall distance: 1,227.04 km (762.45 miles)

Statistics
- Crews: 102 at start, 88 at finish

Overall results
- Overall winner: (France) Sébastien Loeb (France) Citroën Total World Rally Team

Results of Rallye Deutschland (26. ADAC Rallye Deutschland), 10th round of 2007 World Rally Championship, run on August 17–19:

== Report ==
Sébastien Loeb had won the Rallye Deutschland for the sixth time in a row, something no other driver had managed to do before. In the Drivers' World Championship, the defending champion gained five points over the leading Marcus Grönholm, who lost two places on Sunday due to a driving error, when a cow along the route disturbed Grönholm's concentration, damaging the rear of the car very badly and ended up fourth after her teammate Mikko Hirvonen.

François Duval drove a flawless rally and secured second place overall. The privateer was able to win all five special stages on Sunday and worked his way up to second place in the final kilometers of the "Moselwein 2" stage (SS19). In the end, he was only 20.3 seconds short of Loeb.

Surprising information was the end of career by Jakke Honkanen, the Gardemeister pilot, who unexpectedly announced it immediately after the end of the rally, while still at the PKC.

== Results ==
Pos.	Driver	Co-driver	Car	Time	Difference	Points
WRC
1.	(France) Sébastien Loeb	(Monaco) Daniel Elena	Citroën C4 WRC	3:27:27.5	0.0	10
2.	(Belgium) François Duval	(France) Patrick Pivato	Citroën Xsara WRC	3:27:47.8	20.3	8
3.	(Finland) Mikko Hirvonen	(Finland) Jarmo Lehtinen	Ford Focus RS WRC 07	3:28:46.6	1:19.1	6
4.	(Finland) Marcus Grönholm	(Finland) Timo Rautiainen	Ford Focus RS WRC 07	3:29:04.0	1:36.5	5
5.	(Czech Republic) Jan Kopecký	(Belgium) Filip Schovánek	Škoda Fabia WRC	3:30:34.6	3:07.1	4
6.	(Norway) Petter Solberg	(United Kingdom) Phil Mills	Subaru Impreza WRC	3:30:42.2	3:14.7	3
7.	(Finland) Toni Gardemeister	(Finland) Jakke Honkanen	Citroën Xsara WRC	3:31:05.0	3:37.5	2
8.	(Finland) Jari-Matti Latvala	(Finland) Ole Kristian Unnerud	Ford Focus RS WRC 06	3:32:56.8	5:29.3	1
JRC
1. (11.)	(Czech Republic) Martin Prokop	(Czech Republic) Jan Tománek	Citroën C2 S1600	3:52:26.9	0.0	10
2. (12.)	(Estonia) Urmo Aava	(Estonia) Kuldar Sikk	Suzuki Swift S1600	3:53:16.4	49.5	8
3. (14.)	(Zimbabwe) Conrad Rautenbach	(United Kingdom) David Senior	Citroën C2 S1600	3:54:42.8	2:15.9	6
4. (20.)	(Germany) Aaron Burkart	(Germany) Michael Kölbach	Citroën C2 S1600	3:56:51.0	4:24.1	5
5. (25.)	(Slovakia) Jozef Béreš jun.	(Czech Republic) Petr Starý	Renault Clio S1600	4:01:16.5	8:49.6	4
6. (27.)	(Estonia) Jaan Mölder jr.	(Germany) Katrin Becker	Suzuki Swift S1600	4:01:49.3	9:22.4	3
7. (30.)	(France) Yoann Bonato	(France) Benjamin Boulloud	Citroën C2 R2	4:05:32.5	13:05.6	2
8. (32.)	(Estonia) Aigar Pärs	(Estonia) Ken Järveoja	Citroën C2 S1600	4:05:48.3	13:21.4	1

== Retirements ==
- (Poland) Michał Kościuszko - mechanical (SS1);
- (Netherlands) Erik Wevers - mechanical (SS2);
- (Norway) Thomas Schie - mechanical (SS4/5);
- (Spain) Daniel Sordo - engine failure (SS6);
- (Sweden) Patrick Sandell - excluded (after SS6);
- (Austria) Manfred Stohl - engine failure (SS9);

== Special Stages ==
All dates and times are CEST (UTC+2).

Leg	Stage	Time	Name	Length	Winner	Time	Avg. spd.	Rally leader
1 (17 Aug)	SS1	10:13	Ruwertal / Fell 1	19.79 km	(France) S. Loeb	11:04.2	107.26 km/h	(France) S. Loeb
1 (17 Aug)	SS2	11:26	Grafschaft Veldenz 1	23.40 km	(France) S. Loeb	13:12.4	106.31 km/h	(France) S. Loeb
1 (17 Aug)	SS3	12:09	Schones Moselland 1	21.46 km	(Belgium) F. Duval	12:22.9	103.99 km/h	(France) S. Loeb
1 (17 Aug)	SS4	15:17	Ruwertal / Fell 2	19.79 km	(Finland) M. Hirvonen	11:34.2	102.63 km/h	(France) S. Loeb
1 (17 Aug)	SS5	16:30	Gafschaft Veldenz 2	23.40 km	(Belgium) F. Duval	13:30.6	103.92 km/h	(France) S. Loeb
1 (17 Aug)	SS6	17:13	Schones Moselland 2	21.46 km	(Australia) C. Atkinson	12:18.5	104.61 km/h	(Belgium) F. Duval
2 (18 Aug)	SS7	08:33	St Wendeler Land 1	16.37 km	(Finland) M. Hirvonen	8:52.6	110.65 km/h	(France) S. Loeb
2 (18 Aug)	SS8	09:06	Bosenberg 1	19.00 km	(France) S. Loeb	10:39.5	106.96 km/h	(France) S. Loeb
2 (18 Aug)	SS9	10:29	Erzweiler 1	16.51 km	(Finland) M. Grönholm	9:55.9	99.74 km/h	(France) S. Loeb
2 (18 Aug)	SS10	11:02	Arena Panzerplatte 1	30.54 km	(France) S. Loeb	17:57.4	102.05 km/h	(France) S. Loeb
2 (18 Aug)	SS11	14:45	St Wendeler Land 2	16.37 km	(Finland) M. Hirvonen	8:51.6	110.86 km/h	(France) S. Loeb
2 (18 Aug)	SS12	15:18	Bosenberg 2	19.00 km	(Australia) C. Atkinson	10:27.4	109.02 km/h	(France) S. Loeb
2 (18 Aug)	SS13	16:41	Erzweiler 2	16.51 km	(France) S. Loeb	9:45.5	101.51 km/h	(France) S. Loeb
2 (18 Aug)	SS14	17:14	Arena Panzerplatte 2	30.54 km	(Australia) C. Atkinson	17:49.8	102.77 km/h	(France) S. Loeb
3 (19 Aug)	SS15	09:18	Dhrontal 1	11.14 km	(Belgium) F. Duval	6:59.2	95.67 km/h	(France) S. Loeb
3 (19 Aug)	SS16	09:46	Moselwein 1	18.70 km	(Belgium) F. Duval	10:40.3	105.14 km/h	(France) S. Loeb
3 (19 Aug)	SS17	11:11	SSS Circus Maximus Trier	4.36 km	(Belgium) F. Duval	3:11.4	82.00 km/h	(France) S. Loeb
3 (19 Aug)	SS18	13:24	Dhrontal 2	11.14 km	(Belgium) F. Duval	6:53.4	97.01 km/h	(France) S. Loeb
3 (19 Aug)	SS19	13:52	Moselwein 2	18.70 km	(Belgium) F. Duval	10:32.7	106.40 km/h	(France) S. Loeb

== Championship standings after the event ==
=== Drivers' championship ===
Pos	Driver	MON (Monaco)	SWE (Sweden)	NOR (Norway)	MEX (Mexico)	POR (Portugal)	ARG (Argentina)	ITA (Italy)	GRC (Greece)	FIN (Finland)	GER (Germany)	NZL (New Zealand)	ESP (Spain)	FRA (France)	JPN (Japan)	IRL (Republic of Ireland)	GBR (United Kingdom)	Pts
1	(Finland) Marcus Grönholm	3	1	2	2	4	2	1	1	1	4							80
2	(France) Sébastien Loeb	1	2	14	1	1	1	Ret	2	3	1							72
3	(Finland) Mikko Hirvonen	5	3	1	3	5	3	2	4	2	3							63
4	(Norway) Petter Solberg	6	Ret	4	Ret	2	Ret	5	3	Ret	6							29
5	(Spain) Dani Sordo	2	12	25	4	3	6	3	24	Ret	Ret							28
5	(Norway) Henning Solberg	14	4	3	9	9	5	4	5	5	14							28
7	(Australia) Chris Atkinson	4	8	19	5	Ret	7	10	6	4	15							20
8	(Finland) Jari-Matti Latvala	Ret	Ret	5	7	8	4	9	12	Ret	8							13
9	(Finland) Toni Gardemeister	7	6	Ret		DSQ		6			7							10
10	(Sweden) Daniel Carlsson		5	7		6		Ret										9
10	(Austria) Manfred Stohl	10	7	12	6	10	8	7	8	Ret	Ret							9
12	(Belgium) François Duval								Ret		2							8
12	(Czech Republic) Jan Kopecký	8	10	8		22		Ret	7	Ret	5							8
14	(Italy) Gigi Galli		13	6		7												5
15	(Spain) Xavier Pons	25	Ret	16						6	18							3
16	(Estonia) Urmo Aava			28		15		13	14	7	12							2
17	(United Kingdom) Matthew Wilson	12	Ret	26	8	12	30	12	10	10	9							1
17	(Finland) Juho Hänninen		DSQ	17			11	8	Ret	Ret								1
17	(Norway) Mads Østberg		9	37		Ret		Ret		8								1
Pos	Driver	MON (Monaco)	SWE (Sweden)	NOR (Norway)	MEX (Mexico)	POR (Portugal)	ARG (Argentina)	ITA (Italy)	GRC (Greece)	FIN (Finland)	GER (Germany)	NZL (New Zealand)	ESP (Spain)	FRA (France)	JPN (Japan)	IRL (Republic of Ireland)	GBR (United Kingdom)	Pts

Key
Colour	Result
Gold	Winner
Silver	2nd place
Bronze	3rd place
Green	Points finish
Blue	Non-points finish
Blue	Non-classified finish (NC)
Purple	Did not finish (Ret)
Black	Excluded (EX)
Black	Disqualified (DSQ)
White	Did not start (DNS)
White	Cancelled (C)
Blank	Withdrew entry from the event (WD)

=== Manufacturers' championship ===
Rank	Manufacturer	Event																Total points
Rank	Manufacturer	MON (Monaco)	SWE (Sweden)	NOR (Norway)	MEX (Mexico)	POR (Portugal)	ARG (Argentina)	ITA (Italy)	GRC (Greece)	FIN (Finland)	GER (Germany)	NZL (New Zealand)	ESP (Spain)	FRA (France)	JPN (Japan)	IRL (Republic of Ireland)	GBR (United Kingdom)	Total points
1	BP Ford World Rally Team	10	16	18	14	9	14	18	15	18	11	-	-	-	-	-	-	143
2	Citroën Total World Rally Team	18	9	1	15	16	13	6	8	6	10	-	-	-	-	-	-	102
3	Subaru World Rally Team	8	2	5	4	8	2	5	9	5	5	-	-	-	-	-	-	53
4	Stobart VK M-Sport Ford	1	5	10	3	2	9	7	4	4	5	-	-	-	-	-	-	50
5	OMV Kronos	2	7	5	3	4	1	3	2	0	8	-	-	-	-	-	-	35
6	Munchi's Ford World Rally Team		0		0		0	0	1	5		-	-	-	-	-	-	6
