= 2007 Rally Argentina =

Car rally

2007 Rally Argentina 27º Rally Argentina
Round 6 of the 2007 World Rally Championship
← Previous event	Next event →
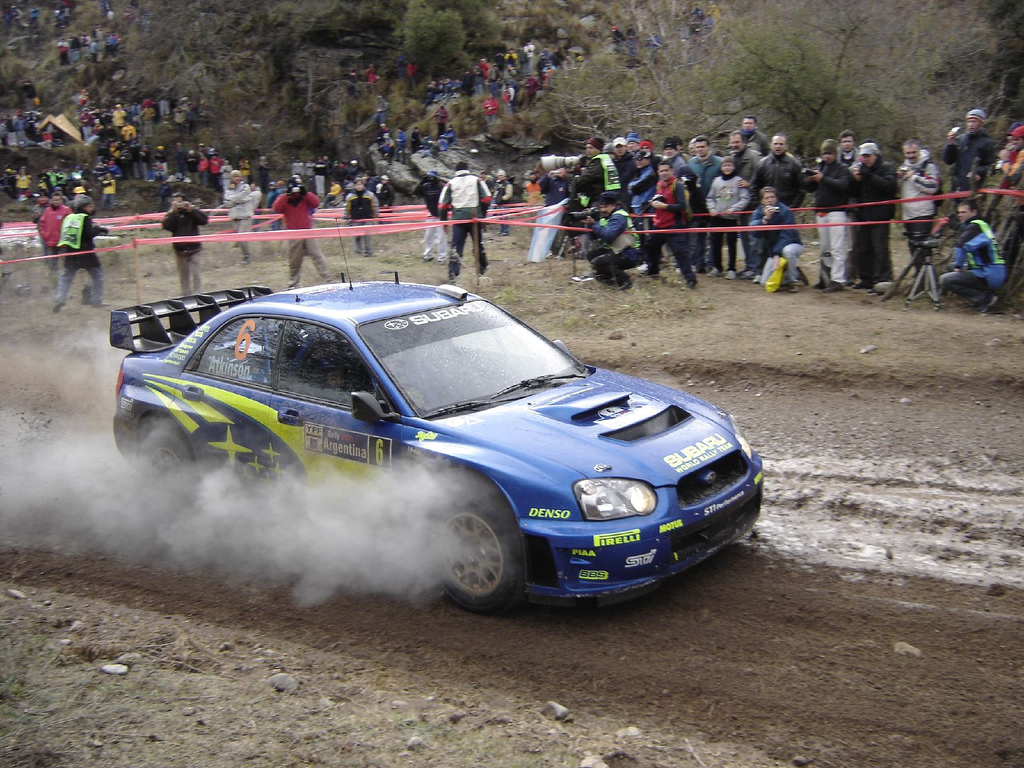
- Chris Atkinson driving his Subaru Impreza WRC S10 at the 2005 edition.
- Host country: Argentina
- Rally base: Córdoba, Argentina
- Dates run: May 3 – 6 2007
- Stages: 16 (346.55 km; 215.34 miles) (incl. cancelled stages) (248.21 km; 154.23 mi)
- Stage surface: Gravel
- Overall distance: 1,383.14 km (859.44 miles) (incl. cancelled stages)

Statistics
- Crews: 70 at start, 41 at finish

Overall results
- Overall winner: (France) Sébastien Loeb (France) Citroën Total World Rally Team

Results of Rally Argentina (27º Rally Argentina), 6th round of 2007 World Rally Championship, was run on May 3–6:

== Results ==
Pos.	Driver	Co-driver	Car	Time	Difference	Points
WRC
1.	(France) Sébastien Loeb	(Monaco) Daniel Elena	Citroën C4 WRC	2:52:03.8	0.0	10
2.	(Finland) Marcus Grönholm	(Finland) Timo Rautiainen	Ford Focus RS WRC 06	2:52:40.5	36.7	8
3.	(Finland) Mikko Hirvonen	(Finland) Jarmo Lehtinen	Ford Focus RS WRC 06	2:54:19.0	2:15.2	6
4.	(Finland) Jari-Matti Latvala	(Finland) Miikka Anttila	Ford Focus RS WRC 06	2:55:46.8	3:43.0	5
5.	(Norway) Henning Solberg	(Norway) Cato Menkerud	Ford Focus RS WRC 06	2:56:13.9	4:10.1	4
6.	(Spain) Daniel Sordo	(Spain) Marc Marti	Citroën C4 WRC	2:56:27.4	4:23.6	3
7.	(Australia) Chris Atkinson	(Belgium) Stéphane Prévot	Subaru Impreza WRC	2:56:47.2	4:43.4	2
8.	(Austria) Manfred Stohl	(Austria) Ilka Minor	Citroën Xsara WRC	2:57:24.0	5:20.2	1
PCWRC
1. (9.)	(Argentina) Federico Villagra	(Argentina) Diego Curletto	Mitsubishi Lancer Evo 9	3:08:53.7	0.0	10
2. (10.)	(Japan) Toshi Arai	(New Zealand) Tony Sircombe	Subaru Impreza WRX STI	3:09:03.0	9.3	8
3. (11.)	(Finland) Juho Hänninen	(Finland) Mikko Markkula	Mitsubishi Lancer Evo 9	3:09:21.9	28.2	6
4. (13.)	(Argentina) Gabriel Pozzo	(Argentina) Mario Stillo	Mitsubishi Lancer Evo 9	3:12:15.7	3:22.0	5
5. (14.)	(Argentina) Marcos Ligato	(Argentina) Flavio Zanella	Mitsubishi Lancer Evo 9	3:13:32.9	4:39.2	4
6. (16.)	(United Kingdom) Niall McShea	(United Kingdom) Gordon Noble	Subaru Impreza WRX STI	3:14:23.6	5:29.9	3
7. (17.)	(Austria) Andreas Aigner	(Germany) Klaus Wicha	Mitsubishi Lancer Evo 9	3:15:02.6	6:08.9	2
8. (18.)	(Estonia) Martin Rauam	(Estonia) Kristo Kraag	Mitsubishi Lancer Evo 9	3:16:59.5	8:05.8	1

== Retirements ==
- (Finland) Kristian Sohlberg - mechanical - accident (SS12);
- (Norway) Petter Solberg - mechanical - engine (SS17);
- (Qatar) Nasser Al-Attiyah - mechanical - lost wheel (SS18);
- (Poland) Leszek Kuzaj - mechanical - lost wheel (SS18);
- (Jordan) Amjad Farrah - mechanical (SS19);
- (Italy) Stefano Marrini - mechanical - radiator (SS20);
- (Japan) Fumio Nutahara - mechanical - fuel tank (SS21);
- (Cyprus) Spyros Pavlides - mechanical - suspension (SS21);
- (San Marino) Loris Baldacci - mechanical - driveshaft (SS22);
- (Italy) Fabio Frisiero - mechanical - turbo (SS22);
- (San Marino) Mirco Baldacci - mechanical - engine (SS22);

== Special Stages ==
All dates and times are ART (UTC-3).

Leg	Stage	Time	Name	Length	Winner	Time	Avg. spd.	Rally leader
1 (3 May - 4 May)	SS1	18:35	River Plate Stadium	2.40 km	(Finland) M. Hirvonen	2:08.3	67.34 km/h	(Finland) M. Hirvonen
1 (3 May - 4 May)	SS2	10:45	Capilla del Monte 1	22.95	CANCELLED	-	-	(Finland) M. Hirvonen
1 (3 May - 4 May)	SS3	11:22	San Marcos 1	19.23 km	CANCELLED	-	-	(Finland) M. Hirvonen
1 (3 May - 4 May)	SS4	12:20	Villa Giardino 1	15.50 km	CANCELLED	-	-	(Finland) M. Hirvonen
1 (3 May - 4 May)	SS5	12:51	Valle Hermoso 1	10.94 km	CANCELLED	-	-	(Finland) M. Hirvonen
1 (3 May - 4 May)	SS6	13:32	Cosquin 1	11.27 km	CANCELLED	-	-	(Finland) M. Hirvonen
1 (3 May - 4 May)	SS7	16:11	Capilla del Monte 2	22.95 km	CANCELLED	-	-	(Finland) M. Hirvonen
1 (3 May - 4 May)	SS8	16:48	San Marcos 2	19.23 km	CANCELLED	-	-	(Finland) M. Hirvonen
1 (3 May - 4 May)	SS9	19:05	Estadio Córdoba	2.40 km	(Finland) M. Hirvonen	2:31.7	55.85 km/h	(Finland) M. Hirvonen
2 (5 May)	SS10	08:23	La Cumbre	18.70 km	(France) S. Loeb	15:35.1	71.99 km/h	(France) S. Loeb
2 (5 May)	SS11	09:21	Ascochinga	23.28 km	(France) S. Loeb	14:45.2	94.68 km/h	(France) S. Loeb
2 (5 May)	SS12	10:14	Villa Giardino 2	15.50 km	(France) S. Loeb	11:02.6	84.21 km/h	(France) S. Loeb
2 (5 May)	SS13	10:45	Valle Hermoso 2	10.94 km	(France) S. Loeb	7:11.3	91.31 km/h	(France) S. Loeb
2 (5 May)	SS14	11:26	Cosquin 2	11.27 km	(France) S. Loeb	6:09.5	109.8 km/h	(France) S. Loeb
2 (5 May)	SS15	14:13	Santa Rosa 1	21.40 km	(Finland) M. Grönholm	12:48.1	100.3 km/h	(France) S. Loeb
2 (5 May)	SS16	15:06	Las Bajadas	16.35 km	(France) S. Loeb	8:39.8	113.24 km/h	(France) S. Loeb
2 (5 May)	SS17	15:52	Amboy	20.29 km	(France) S. Loeb	10:19.4	117.93 km/h	(France) S. Loeb
2 (5 May)	SS18	16:57	Santa Rosa 2	21.40 km	(Finland) M. Grönholm	12:56.3	99.24 km/h	(France) S. Loeb
3 (6 May)	SS19	08:19	Mina Clavero I	23.81 km	(France) S. Loeb	18:48.8	75.94 km/h	(France) S. Loeb
3 (6 May)	SS20	09:52	El Condor 1	16.81 km	(Spain) D. Sordo	13:39.9	73.81 km/h	(France) S. Loeb
3 (6 May)	SS21	10:39	Mina Clavero 2	24.45 km	(France) S. Loeb	18:51.2	77.81 km/h	(France) S. Loeb
3 (6 May)	SS22	13:05	El Condor 2	16.81 km	(Spain) D. Sordo	13:46.8	73.19 km/h	(France) S. Loeb
3 (6 May)	SS23	15:05	Estadio Córdoba 2	2.40 km	(France) S. Loeb	2:25.4	59.42 km/h	(France) S. Loeb

== Championship standings after the event ==
=== Drivers' championship ===
Pos	Driver	MON (Monaco)	SWE (Sweden)	NOR (Norway)	MEX (Mexico)	POR (Portugal)	ARG (Argentina)	ITA (Italy)	GRC (Greece)	FIN (Finland)	GER (Germany)	NZL (New Zealand)	ESP (Spain)	FRA (France)	JPN (Japan)	IRL (Republic of Ireland)	GBR (United Kingdom)	Pts
1	(France) Sébastien Loeb	1	2	14	1	1	1											48
2	(Finland) Marcus Grönholm	3	1	2	2	4	2											45
3	(Finland) Mikko Hirvonen	5	3	1	3	5	3											36
4	(Spain) Dani Sordo	2	12	25	4	3	6											22
5	(Norway) Petter Solberg	6	Ret	4	Ret	2	Ret											16
6	(Norway) Henning Solberg	14	4	3	9	11	5											15
7	(Australia) Chris Atkinson	4	8	19	5	Ret	7											12
7	(Finland) Jari-Matti Latvala	Ret	Ret	5	7	8	4											12
9	(Sweden) Daniel Carlsson		5	7		6												9
10	(Austria) Manfred Stohl	10	7	12	6	10	8											6
11	(Finland) Toni Gardemeister	7	6	Ret		DSQ												5
11	(Italy) Gigi Galli		13	6		7												5
13	(Czech Republic) Jan Kopecký	8	10	8		22												2
14	(United Kingdom) Matthew Wilson	12	Ret	26	8	12	30											1
Pos	Driver	MON (Monaco)	SWE (Sweden)	NOR (Norway)	MEX (Mexico)	POR (Portugal)	ARG (Argentina)	ITA (Italy)	GRC (Greece)	FIN (Finland)	GER (Germany)	NZL (New Zealand)	ESP (Spain)	FRA (France)	JPN (Japan)	IRL (Republic of Ireland)	GBR (United Kingdom)	Pts

Key
Colour	Result
Gold	Winner
Silver	2nd place
Bronze	3rd place
Green	Points finish
Blue	Non-points finish
Blue	Non-classified finish (NC)
Purple	Did not finish (Ret)
Black	Excluded (EX)
Black	Disqualified (DSQ)
White	Did not start (DNS)
White	Cancelled (C)
Blank	Withdrew entry from the event (WD)

=== Manufacturers' championship ===
Rank	Manufacturer	Event																Total points
Rank	Manufacturer	MON (Monaco)	SWE (Sweden)	NOR (Norway)	MEX (Mexico)	POR (Portugal)	ARG (Argentina)	ITA (Italy)	GRC (Greece)	FIN (Finland)	GER (Germany)	NZL (New Zealand)	ESP (Spain)	FRA (France)	JPN (Japan)	IRL (Republic of Ireland)	GBR (United Kingdom)	Total points
1	BP Ford World Rally Team	10	16	18	14	9	14	-	-	-	-	-	-	-	-	-	-	81
2	Citroën Total World Rally Team	18	9	1	15	16	13	-	-	-	-	-	-	-	-	-	-	72
3	Stobart VK M-Sport Ford	1	5	10	3	2	9	-	-	-	-	-	-	-	-	-	-	30
4	Subaru World Rally Team	8	2	5	4	8	2	-	-	-	-	-	-	-	-	-	-	29
5	OMV Kronos	2	7	5	3	4	1	-	-	-	-	-	-	-	-	-	-	22
6	Munchi's Ford World Rally Team		0		0		0	-	-	-	-	-	-	-	-	-	-	0
