= 2007 Rally Ireland =

Rallying motorsport event

2007 Rally Ireland 1st Rally Ireland
Round 15 of the 2007 World Rally Championship
← Previous event	Next event →
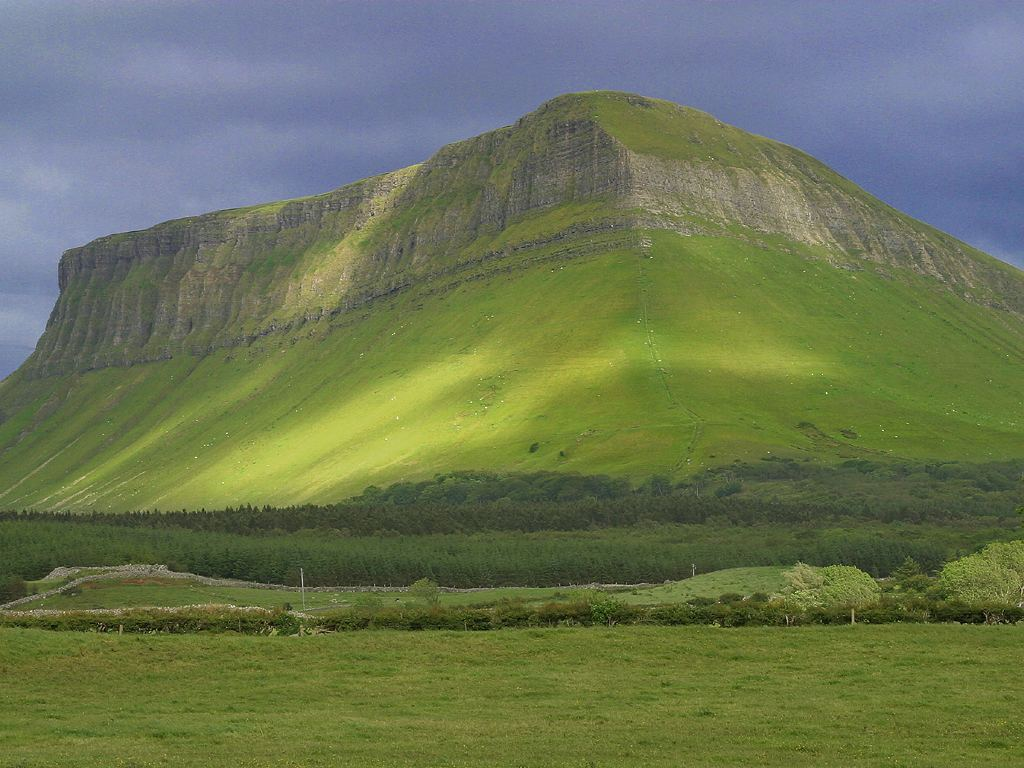
- Benbulbin Mountain, in County Sligo, Ireland.
- Host country: Republic of Ireland / Northern Ireland
- Rally base: Sligo, County Sligo, Republic of Ireland
- Dates run: November 15 – 18 2007
- Stages: 20 (328.43 km; 204.08 miles)
- Stage surface: Tarmac
- Overall distance: 1,196.25 km (743.32 miles)

Statistics
- Crews: 84 at start, 66 at finish

Overall results
- Overall winner: (France) Sébastien Loeb (France) Citroën Total World Rally Team

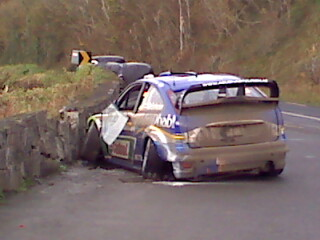
Marcus Grönholm retired.

The 2007 Rally Ireland, the first Rally Ireland and fifteenth round of the 2007 World Rally Championship, was a motor rally held from 15 to 18 November. It took place over eight counties on both sides of the border between the Republic of Ireland and Northern Ireland. The event started in Stormont, Belfast, and finished in Mullaghmore, County Sligo.

== Report ==
The rally began with the first special stage in front of Stormont Castle in Belfast, which Marcus Grönholm won Thursday evening. The next day, in the fourth special stage, Grönholm hit a wall hard, and he and co-driver Timo Rautiainen were taken to hospital as a precaution. Both remained unhurt but withdrew from the rally.

Citroën driver Sébastien Loeb took a step towards his fourth Drivers' World Championship title, retaking the lead in the drivers' standings. His advantage over his rival Grönholm, who retired on Friday after a serious accident, had been six points before the last round of the world championship. Mikko Hirvonen finished fourth, securing the second manufacturers' world championship title in a row for the Ford team.

Jari-Matti Latvala was third, taking his first WRC podium. On Friday, Latvala edged out Hirvonen for third place. He held this position to the finish despite briefly going off the road on Saturday, losing a little time.

== Results ==
Pos.	Driver	Co-driver	Car	Time	Difference	Points
WRC
1.	(France) Sébastien Loeb	(Monaco) Daniel Elena	Citroën C4 WRC	3:01:39.2	0.0	10
2.	(Spain) Dani Sordo	(Spain) Marc Martí	Citroën C4 WRC	3:02:32.6	53.4	8
3.	(Finland) Jari-Matti Latvala	(Finland) Miikka Anttila	Ford Focus RS WRC 06	3:03:27.4	1:48.2	6
4.	(Finland) Mikko Hirvonen	(Finland) Jarmo Lehtinen	Ford Focus RS WRC 07	3:03:56.9	2:17.7	5
5.	(Norway) Petter Solberg	(United Kingdom) Phil Mills	Subaru Impreza WRC 07	3:04:35.0	2:55.8	4
6.	(United Kingdom) Guy Wilks	(United Kingdom) Phil Pugh	Subaru Impreza WRC	3:07:37.1	5:57.9	3
7.	(United Kingdom) Matthew Wilson	(Republic of Ireland) Michael Orr	Ford Focus RS WRC 06	3:11:44.1	10:04.9	2
8.	(Republic of Ireland) Gareth McHale	(United Kingdom) Allan Harryman	Ford Focus RS WRC 06	3:12:47.5	11:08.3	1
PCWRC
1. (10.)	(United Kingdom) Niall McShea	(United Kingdom) Marshall Clarke	Subaru Impreza	3:18:11.3	0.0	10
2. (11.)	(Argentina) Gabriel Pozzo	(Argentina) Daniel Stillo	Mitsubishi Lancer Evo 9	3:18:55.4	44.1	8
3. (17.)	(Qatar) Nasser Al-Attiyah	(United Kingdom) Chris Patterson	Subaru Impreza C 07	3:22:42.4	4:31.1	6
4. (18.)	(Italy) Simone Campedelli	(Italy) Danilo Fappani	Mitsubishi Lancer Evo 9	3:24:47.2	6:35.9	5
5. (20.)	(Czech Republic) Štěpán Vojtěch	(Czech Republic) Michal Ernst	Mitsubishi Lancer Evo 9	3:26:45.4	8:34.1	4
6. (21.)	(Japan) Fumio Nutahara	(United Kingdom) Daniel Barritt	Mitsubishi Lancer Evo 9	3:27:32.8	9:21.5	3
7. (22.)	(Republic of Ireland) Colm Murphy	(Republic of Ireland) Ger Loughrey	Subaru Impreza	3:27:34.6	9:23.3	2
8. (23.)	(United Kingdom) Philip Morrow	(United Kingdom) David Senior	Mitsubishi Lancer Evo 9	3:28:46.9	10:35.6	1

== Retirements ==
- (Republic of Ireland) Eugene Donnelly - mechanical (SS4);
- (Finland) Marcus Grönholm - went off the road - hit the wall (SS4);
- (Spain) Xavier Pons - mechanical - engine (SS4);
- (Austria) Andreas Aigner - went off the road (SS7);
- (United Kingdom) Kris Meeke - mechanical (SS9);
- (Republic of Ireland) Andrew Nesbitt - went off the road (SS11);
- (United Kingdom) Gareth Jones - mechanical (SS11);
- (Republic of Ireland) Ray Breen - went off the road (SS11);
- (Republic of Ireland) Tim McNulty - mechanical (SS12);
- (Austria) Manfred Stohl - mechanical (SS13);
- (United Kingdom) Mark Higgins - rolled (SS16);
- (Poland) Leszek Kuzaj - mechanical (SS16);
- (Sweden) Patrik Flodin - mechanical (SS17);
- (Portugal) Armindo Araújo - went off the road (SS19);

== Special Stages ==
All dates and times are GMT (UTC).

Leg	Stage	Time	Name	Length	Winner	Time	Avg. spd.	Rally leader
1 (15/16 Nov)	SSS1	19:00 (15-Nov)	(United Kingdom) Stormont	1.82 km	(Finland) M. Grönholm	1:30.8	72.16 km/h	(Finland) M. Grönholm
1 (15/16 Nov)	SS2	08:05 (16-Nov)	(Republic of Ireland) Geevagh 1	11.47 km	(France) S. Loeb	6:05.7	112.92 km/h	(France) S. Loeb
1 (15/16 Nov)	SS3	08:33	(Republic of Ireland) Arigna 1	27.89 km	(Spain) D. Sordo	15:44.0	106.36 km/h	(France) S. Loeb
1 (15/16 Nov)	SS4	09:24	(Republic of Ireland) Lough Gill 1	20.56 km	(Spain) D. Sordo	10:54.7	113.05 km/h	(Spain) D. Sordo
1 (15/16 Nov)	SS5	11:29	(Republic of Ireland) Geevagh 2	11.47 km	(France) S. Loeb	6:22.0	108.09 km/h	(France) S. Loeb
1 (15/16 Nov)	SS6	11:57	(Republic of Ireland) Arigna 2	27.89 km	(France) S. Loeb	16:09.6	103.55 km/h	(France) S. Loeb
1 (15/16 Nov)	SS7	12:48	(Republic of Ireland) Lough Gill 2	20.56 km	(Spain) D. Sordo	10:55.5	112.92 km/h	(France) S. Loeb
1 (15/16 Nov)	SS8	15:01	(Republic of Ireland) Glenboy	22.25 km	(France) S. Loeb	11:56.0	111.87 km/h	(France) S. Loeb
1 (15/16 Nov)	SS9	15:54	(Republic of Ireland) Bencroy	15.43 km	(Spain) D. Sordo	8:21.3	110.81 km/h	(France) S. Loeb
1 (15/16 Nov)	SS10	16:19	(Republic of Ireland) Drumshanbo	8.65 km	(France) S. Loeb	5:00.3	103.70 km/h	(France) S. Loeb
2 (17 Nov)	SS11	8:13	(United Kingdom) Sloughan Glen 1	20.95 km	(France) S. Loeb	11:37.7	108.10 km/h	(France) S. Loeb
2 (17 Nov)	SS12	09:08	(United Kingdom) Ballinamallard 1	17.95 km	(France) S. Loeb	9:35.9	112.21 km/h	(France) S. Loeb
2 (17 Nov)	SS13	09:51	(United Kingdom) Tempo 1	13.46 km	(France) S. Loeb	7:31.6	107.30 km/h	(France) S. Loeb
2 (17 Nov)	SS14	14:04	(United Kingdom) Sloughan Glen 2	20.95 km	(Australia) C. Atkinson	11:25.7	109.99 km/h	(France) S. Loeb
2 (17 Nov)	SS15	14:59	(United Kingdom) Ballinamallard 2	17.95 km	(France) S. Loeb	9:30.7	113.23 km/h	(France) S. Loeb
2 (17 Nov)	SS16	15:42	(United Kingdom) Tempo 2	13.46 km	(Finland) J-M. Latvala	7:28.9	107.94 km/h	(France) S. Loeb
3 (18 Nov)	SS17	09:03	(United Kingdom) Murley	24.70 km	(Finland) M. Hirvonen	13:19.9	111.16 km/h	(France) S. Loeb
3 (18 Nov)	SS18	09:51	(United Kingdom) Fardross	14.77 km	(Finland) M. Hirvonen	8:49.8	100.36 km/h	(France) S. Loeb
3 (18 Nov)	SS19	11:39	(Republic of Ireland) Donegal Bay	14.06 km	(Finland) J-M. Latvala	7:00.9	120.26 km/h	(France) S. Loeb
3 (18 Nov)	SS20	13:08	(Republic of Ireland) Mullaghmore	2.38 km	(Norway) P. Solberg	1:16.9	111.42 km/h	(France) S. Loeb

== Championship standings after the event ==
=== Drivers' championship ===
Pos	Driver	MON (Monaco)	SWE (Sweden)	NOR (Norway)	MEX (Mexico)	POR (Portugal)	ARG (Argentina)	ITA (Italy)	GRC (Greece)	FIN (Finland)	GER (Germany)	NZL (New Zealand)	ESP (Spain)	FRA (France)	JPN (Japan)	IRL (Republic of Ireland)	GBR (United Kingdom)	Pts
1	(France) Sébastien Loeb	1	2	14	1	1	1	Ret	2	3	1	2	1	1	Ret	1		110
2	(Finland) Marcus Grönholm	3	1	2	2	4	2	1	1	1	4	1	3	2	Ret	Ret		104
3	(Finland) Mikko Hirvonen	5	3	1	3	5	3	2	4	2	3	3	4	13	1	4		89
4	(Spain) Dani Sordo	2	12	25	4	3	6	3	24	Ret	Ret	6	2	3	2	2		61
5	(Norway) Petter Solberg	6	Ret	4	Ret	2	Ret	5	3	Ret	6	7	6	5	Ret	5		42
6	(Norway) Henning Solberg	14	4	3	9	9	5	4	5	5	14	9	10	9	3	16		34
7	(Finland) Jari-Matti Latvala	Ret	Ret	5	7	8	4	9	12	Ret	8	5	7	4	26	3		30
8	(Australia) Chris Atkinson	4	8	19	5	Ret	7	10	6	4	15	4	8	6	Ret	42		29
9	(Belgium) François Duval								Ret		2		5	Ret				12
9	(Austria) Manfred Stohl	10	7	12	6	10	8	7	8	Ret	Ret	12	Ret	14	6	Ret		12
11	(Czech Republic) Jan Kopecký	8	10	8		22		Ret	7	Ret	5		Ret	7				10
11	(Finland) Toni Gardemeister	7	6	Ret		DSQ		6			7							10
13	(Sweden) Daniel Carlsson		5	7		6		Ret										9
14	(United Kingdom) Matthew Wilson	12	Ret	26	8	12	30	12	10	10	9	10	11	Ret	4	7		8
15	(Italy) Gigi Galli		13	6		7												5
16	(Argentina) Luís Pérez Companc		15		19	DNS	28	Ret	11	11		23	Ret		5			4
16	(Spain) Xavier Pons	25	Ret	16						6	18	Ret	9	8	36	Ret		4
18	(United Kingdom) Guy Wilks			Ret		Ret			9	9	10					6		3
18	(Estonia) Urmo Aava			28		15		13	14	7	12	8	18	Ret	18			3
20	(Argentina) Federico Villagra					DNS	9	11	32	14		11	13		7			2
21	(Finland) Juho Hänninen		DSQ	17			11	8	Ret	Ret		19	23		24			1
21	(Norway) Mads Østberg		9	37		Ret		Ret		8								1
21	(Japan) Katsuhiko Taguchi														8			1
21	(Republic of Ireland) Gareth MacHale	11			Ret	13		Ret								8		1
Pos	Driver	MON (Monaco)	SWE (Sweden)	NOR (Norway)	MEX (Mexico)	POR (Portugal)	ARG (Argentina)	ITA (Italy)	GRC (Greece)	FIN (Finland)	GER (Germany)	NZL (New Zealand)	ESP (Spain)	FRA (France)	JPN (Japan)	IRL (Republic of Ireland)	GBR (United Kingdom)	Pts

Key
Colour	Result
Gold	Winner
Silver	2nd place
Bronze	3rd place
Green	Points finish
Blue	Non-points finish
Blue	Non-classified finish (NC)
Purple	Did not finish (Ret)
Black	Excluded (EX)
Black	Disqualified (DSQ)
White	Did not start (DNS)
White	Cancelled (C)
Blank	Withdrew entry from the event (WD)

=== Manufacturers' championship ===
Rank	Manufacturer	Event																Total points
Rank	Manufacturer	MON (Monaco)	SWE (Sweden)	NOR (Norway)	MEX (Mexico)	POR (Portugal)	ARG (Argentina)	ITA (Italy)	GRC (Greece)	FIN (Finland)	GER (Germany)	NZL (New Zealand)	ESP (Spain)	FRA (France)	JPN (Japan)	IRL (Republic of Ireland)	GBR (United Kingdom)	Total points
1	BP Ford World Rally Team	10	16	18	14	9	14	18	15	18	11	16	11	9	10	5	-	194
2	Citroën Total World Rally Team	18	9	1	15	16	13	6	8	6	10	11	18	16	8	18	-	173
3	Stobart VK M-Sport Ford	1	5	10	3	2	9	7	4	4	5	5	2	7	7	9	-	80
4	Subaru World Rally Team	8	2	5	4	8	2	5	9	5	5	7	4	7	2	6	-	79
5	OMV Kronos	2	7	5	3	4	1	3	2	0	8	0	4	0	4	0	-	43
6	Munchi's Ford World Rally Team		0		0		0	0	1	5		0	0		8		-	14
