= 2007 Wales Rally GB =

Rally car race

2007 Rally GB 63rd Wales Rally of Great Britain
Round 16 of the 2007 World Rally Championship
← Previous event
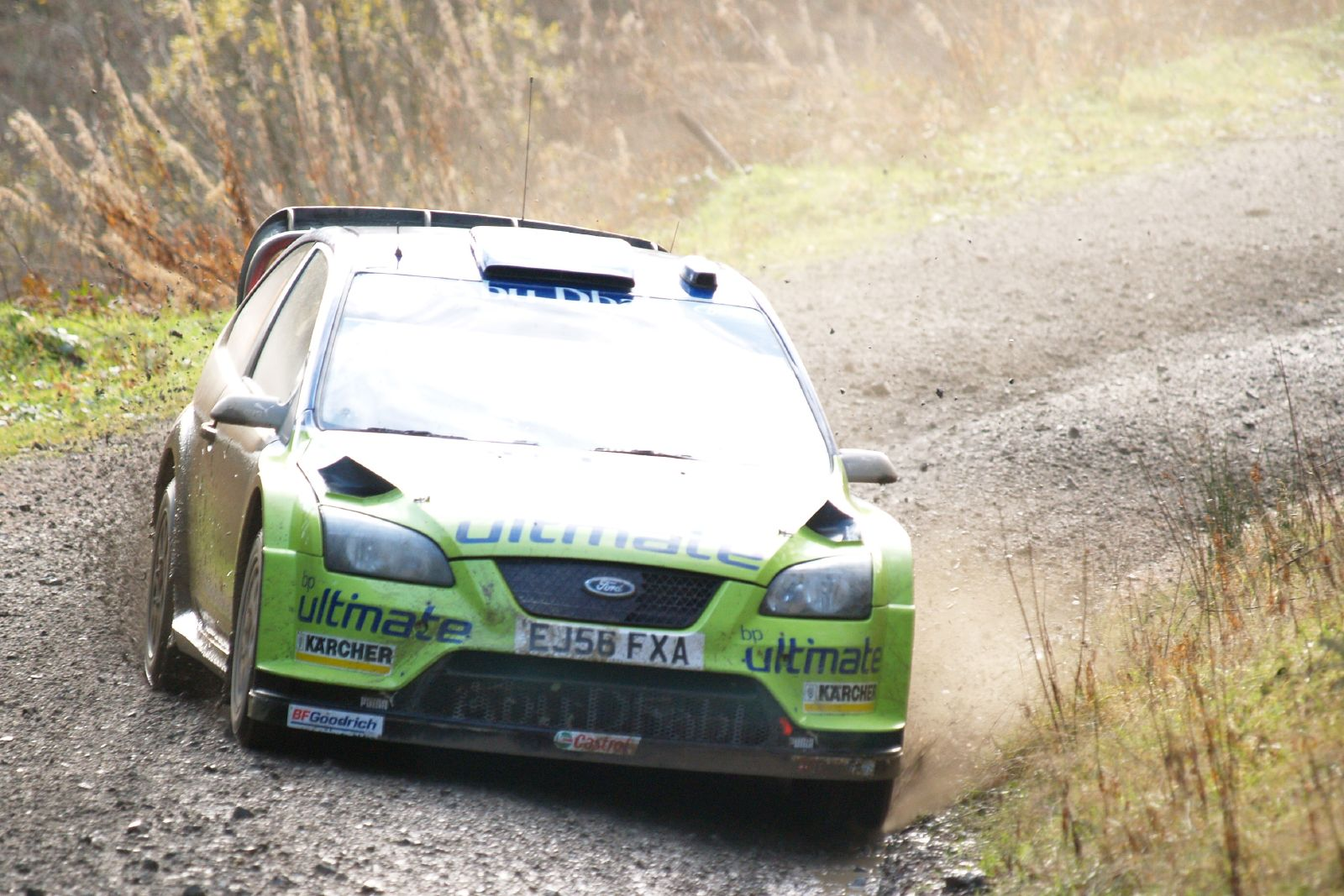
- Rally winner Mikko Hirvonen.
- Host country: United Kingdom
- Rally base: Cardiff, Wales
- Dates run: November 30 – December 2, 2007
- Stages: 17 (359.54 km; 223.41 miles)
- Stage surface: Gravel

Statistics
- Crews: 108 at start, 83 at finish

Overall results
- Overall winner: (Finland) Mikko Hirvonen (United Kingdom) BP Ford World Rally Team

The 2007 Wales Rally GB (formally known as 63rd Wales Rally of Great Britain) was the 16th round of the 2007 World Rally Championship. The race was held over three days between 30 November and 2 December 2007.

== Report ==
Sébastien Loeb became world champion for the fourth time in a row. He had thus equaled Tommi Mäkinen's record. Third place at the season finale in Wales was enough for the Citroën driver. Loeb started the last world championship race of the season six points ahead of his rival Marcus Grönholm. Grönholm was able to make up two points with second place, and in the end Loeb had a four-point lead in the drivers' standings.

Rally won Grönholm teammate Mikko Hirvonen. He took the lead with four special stage best times on Friday. Hirvonen was 15.2 seconds clear of second-placed Gronholm to secure his fourth WRC win of his career.

Subaru driver Petter Solberg came fourth behind the leading trio. He was able to conclude such a season with moderate success in a reasonably forgiving manner. Fourth place and his teammate Chris Atkinson's seventh place secured Subaru third place in the Manufacturers' Championship ahead of the Stobart team. Days two and three were dominated by young M-Sport driver Jari-Matti Latvala, who had already been confirmed as a driver for Ford for next year. However, since he had lost almost ten minutes on the first day due to a broken windshield wiper, he was only able to finish tenth.

== Results ==
Pos.	Driver	Co-driver	Car	Time	Difference	Points
WRC
1.	(Finland) Mikko Hirvonen	(Finland) Jarmo Lehtinen	Ford Focus RS WRC 07	3:22:50.9	0.0	10
2.	(Finland) Marcus Grönholm	(Finland) Timo Rautiainen	Ford Focus RS WRC 07	3:23:06.1	15.2	8
3.	(France) Sébastien Loeb	(Monaco) Daniel Elena	Citroën C4 WRC	3:24:23.9	1:33.0	6
4.	(Norway) Petter Solberg	(United Kingdom) Phil Mills	Subaru Impreza WRC2007	3:25:48.2	2:57.3	5
5.	(Spain) Dani Sordo	(Spain) Marc Marti	Citroën C4 WRC	3:26:05.2	3:14.3	4
6.	(United Kingdom) Matthew Wilson	(Republic of Ireland) Michael Orr	Ford Focus WRC 06	3:30:23.8	7:32.9	3
7.	(Australia) Chris Atkinson	(Belgium) Stéphane Prévot	Subaru Impreza WRC2007	3:31:20.4	8:29.5	2
8.	(Austria) Manfred Stohl	(Austria) Ilka Minor	Citroën Xsara WRC	3:31:45.5	8:54.6	1
PCWRC
1. (13.)	(United Kingdom) Guy Wilks	(United Kingdom) Phil Pugh	Mitsubishi Lancer Evo 9	3:44:23.7	0.0	10
2. (14.)	(Finland) Juho Hänninen	(Finland) Mikko Markkula	Mitsubishi Lancer Evo 9	3:44:57.9	34.2	8
3. (16.)	(United Kingdom) Mark Higgins	(United Kingdom) Scott Martin	Mitsubishi Lancer Evo 9	3:46:10.2	1:46.5	6
4. (17.)	(Italy) Alessandro Bettega	(Italy) Simone Scattolin	Mitsubishi Lancer Evo 9	3:49:47.3	5:23.6	5
5. (19.)	(United Kingdom) David Higgins	(United Kingdom) Ieuan Thomas	Subaru Impreza WRX STi	3:51:32.8	7:09.1	4
6. (21.)	(San Marino) Mirco Baldacci	(Italy) Giovanni Agnese	Subaru Impreza WRX STi	3:53:12.8	8:49.1	3
7. (23.)	(Portugal) Armindo Araújo	(Portugal) Miguel Ramalho	Mitsubishi Lancer Evo 9	4:00:58.9	16:35.2	2
8. (23.)	(Czech Republic) Štěpán Vojtěch	(Czech Republic) Michal Ernst	Mitsubishi Lancer Evo 9	4:02:31.4	18:07.7	1

== Retirements ==
- (Argentina) Gabriel Pozzo - retired (SS6);
- (Poland) Michał Sołowow - retired (SS6);
- (Romania) Claudiu David - mechanical (SS7);
- (Zimbabwe) Conrad Rautenbach - went off the road (SS8);
- (Norway) Andreas Mikkelsen - went off the road (SS9);
- (United Kingdom) Stuart Jones - crashed (SS12);
- (Poland) Leszek Kuzaj - did not start leg 3 (SS13/14);
- (New Zealand) Hayden Paddon - did not start leg 3 (SS13/14);
- (Cyprus) Spyros Pavlides - mechanical (SS14);
- (Russia) Yevgeni Vertunov - mechanical (SS14);
- (Argentina) Luís Pérez Companc - went off the road (SS14/15);
- (Sweden) Patrik Flodin - mechanical (SS6);

== Special Stages ==
All dates and times are GMT (UTC).

Leg	Stage	Time	Name	Length	Winner	Time	Avg. spd.	Rally leader
1 (30 Nov)	SS1	09:53	Port Talbot 1	17.41 km	(Finland) M. Hirvonen	9:15.2	112.9 km/h	(Finland) M. Hirvonen
1 (30 Nov)	SS2	10:41	Resolfen 1	25.08 km	(Finland) M. Hirvonen	12:50.6	117.2 km/h	(Finland) M. Hirvonen
1 (30 Nov)	SS3	11:39	Rheola 1	27.91 km	(Finland) M. Hirvonen	15:55.7	105.1 km/h	(Finland) M. Hirvonen
1 (30 Nov)	SS4	14:10	Port Talbot 2	17.41 km	(Finland) M. Hirvonen	9:17.2	112 km/h	(Finland) M. Hirvonen
1 (30 Nov)	SS5	14:58	Resolfen 2	25.08 km	(France) S. Loeb (Finland) M. Grönholm	13:20.9	112.7 km/h	(Finland) M. Hirvonen
1 (30 Nov)	SS6	16:23	Rheola 2	27.91 km	(Finland) J. Latvala	16:39.3	100.5 km/h	(Finland) M. Hirvonen
2 (1 Dec)	SS7	09:38	Crychan 1	19.56 km	(Finland) J. Latvala	10:31.2	111.6 km/h	(Finland) M. Hirvonen
2 (1 Dec)	SS8	10:21	Epynt 1	13.76 km	(Finland) J. Latvala	7:33.2	109.3 km/h	(Finland) M. Hirvonen
2 (1 Dec)	SS9	10:54	Halfway 1	18.37 km	(Finland) J. Latvala	10:28.3	105.3 km/h	(Finland) M. Hirvonen
2 (1 Dec)	SS10	14:47	Crychan 2	19.56 km	(Finland) J. Latvala	10:39.8	110.1 km/h	(Finland) M. Hirvonen
2 (1 Dec)	SS11	15:30	Epynt 2	13.76 km	(Finland) J. Latvala	7:40.1	107.7 km/h	(Finland) M. Hirvonen
2 (1 Dec)	SS12	16:29	Halfway 2	18.37 km	(Finland) J. Latvala	10:39.6	103.4 km/h	(Finland) M. Hirvonen
2 (1 Dec)	SS13	19:00	Cardiff	1.10 km	(Finland) M. Grönholm	1:03.8	62.1 km/h	(Finland) M. Hirvonen
3 (2 Dec)	SS14	07:46	Brechfa 1	28.89 km	(Finland) J. Latvala (Finland) M. Hirvonen	16:14.2	106.8 km/h	(Finland) M. Hirvonen
3 (2 Dec)	SS15	08:33	Trawscoed 1	28.24 km	(Finland) J. Latvala	16:39.7	101.7 km/h	(Finland) M. Hirvonen
3 (2 Dec)	SS16	12:09	Brechfa 2	28.89 km	(Finland) J. Latvala	16:11.6	107.0 km/h	(Finland) M. Hirvonen
3 (2 Dec)	SS17	12:56	Trawscoed 2	28.24 km	(Finland) J. Latvala	16:51.0	100.6 km/h	(Finland) M. Hirvonen

== Final championship standings ==
=== Drivers' championship ===
Pos	Driver	MON (Monaco)	SWE (Sweden)	NOR (Norway)	MEX (Mexico)	POR (Portugal)	ARG (Argentina)	ITA (Italy)	GRC (Greece)	FIN (Finland)	GER (Germany)	NZL (New Zealand)	ESP (Spain)	FRA (France)	JPN (Japan)	IRL (Republic of Ireland)	GBR (United Kingdom)	Pts
1	(France) Sébastien Loeb	1	2	14	1	1	1	Ret	2	3	1	2	1	1	Ret	1	3	116
2	(Finland) Marcus Grönholm	3	1	2	2	4	2	1	1	1	4	1	3	2	Ret	Ret	2	112
3	(Finland) Mikko Hirvonen	5	3	1	3	5	3	2	4	2	3	3	4	13	1	4	1	99
4	(Spain) Dani Sordo	2	12	25	4	3	6	3	24	Ret	Ret	6	2	3	2	2	5	65
5	(Norway) Petter Solberg	6	Ret	4	Ret	2	Ret	5	3	Ret	6	7	6	5	Ret	5	4	47
6	(Norway) Henning Solberg	14	4	3	9	9	5	4	5	5	13	9	10	9	3	16	15	34
7	(Australia) Chris Atkinson	4	8	19	5	Ret	7	10	6	4	15	4	8	6	Ret	42	7	31
8	(Finland) Jari-Matti Latvala	Ret	Ret	5	7	8	4	9	12	Ret	8	5	7	4	26	3	10	30
9	(Austria) Manfred Stohl	10	7	12	6	10	8	7	8	Ret	Ret	12	Ret	14	6	Ret	8	13
10	(Belgium) François Duval								Ret		2		5	Ret				12
11	(United Kingdom) Matthew Wilson	12	Ret	26	8	12	30	12	10	10	9	10	11	Ret	4	7	6	11
12	(Czech Republic) Jan Kopecký	8	10	8		22		Ret	7	Ret	5		Ret	7			12	10
12	(Finland) Toni Gardemeister	7	6	Ret		DSQ		6			7							10
14	(Sweden) Daniel Carlsson		5	7		6		Ret										9
15	(Italy) Gigi Galli		13	6		7												5
16	(Argentina) Luís Pérez Companc		15		19	DNS	28	Ret	11	11		23	Ret		5		Ret	4
16	(Spain) Xavier Pons	25	Ret	16						6	18	Ret	9	8	36	Ret	9	4
18	(United Kingdom) Guy Wilks			Ret		Ret			9	9	10					6	13	3
18	(Estonia) Urmo Aava			28		15		13	14	7	12	8	18	Ret	18			3
20	(Argentina) Federico Villagra					DNS	9	11	32	14		11	13		7		18	2
21	(Finland) Juho Hänninen		DSQ	17			11	8	Ret	Ret		19	23		24			1
21	(Norway) Mads Østberg		9	37		Ret		Ret		8							11	1
21	(Japan) Katsuhiko Taguchi														8			1
21	(Republic of Ireland) Gareth MacHale	11			Ret	13		Ret								8		1
Pos	Driver	MON (Monaco)	SWE (Sweden)	NOR (Norway)	MEX (Mexico)	POR (Portugal)	ARG (Argentina)	ITA (Italy)	GRC (Greece)	FIN (Finland)	GER (Germany)	NZL (New Zealand)	ESP (Spain)	FRA (France)	JPN (Japan)	IRL (Republic of Ireland)	GBR (United Kingdom)	Pts

Key
Colour	Result
Gold	Winner
Silver	2nd place
Bronze	3rd place
Green	Points finish
Blue	Non-points finish
Blue	Non-classified finish (NC)
Purple	Did not finish (Ret)
Black	Excluded (EX)
Black	Disqualified (DSQ)
White	Did not start (DNS)
White	Cancelled (C)
Blank	Withdrew entry from the event (WD)

=== Manufacturers' championship ===
Rank	Manufacturer	Event																Total points
Rank	Manufacturer	MON (Monaco)	SWE (Sweden)	NOR (Norway)	MEX (Mexico)	POR (Portugal)	ARG (Argentina)	ITA (Italy)	GRC (Greece)	FIN (Finland)	GER (Germany)	NZL (New Zealand)	ESP (Spain)	FRA (France)	JPN (Japan)	IRL (Republic of Ireland)	GBR (United Kingdom)	Total points
1	BP Ford World Rally Team	10	16	18	14	9	14	18	15	18	11	16	11	9	10	5	18	212
2	Citroën Total World Rally Team	18	9	1	15	16	13	6	8	6	10	11	18	16	8	18	10	183
3	Subaru World Rally Team	8	2	5	4	8	2	5	9	5	5	7	4	7	2	6	8	87
4	Stobart VK M-Sport Ford	1	5	10	3	2	9	7	4	4	5	5	2	7	7	9	1	81
5	OMV Kronos	2	7	5	3	4	1	3	2	0	8	0	4	0	4	0	2	45
6	Munchi's Ford World Rally Team		0		0		0	0	1	5		0	0		8		0	14
