= 2007 Rally de Portugal =

Car rally

2007 Rally de Portugal 41º Vodafone Rally de Portugal
Round 5 of the 2007 World Rally Championship
← Previous event	Next event →
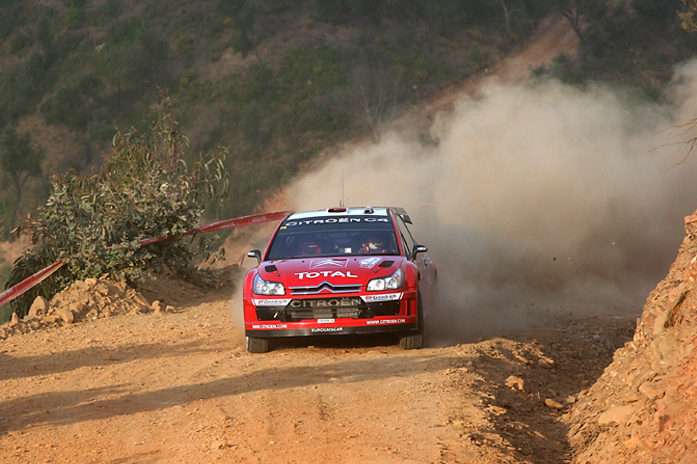
- Eventual winner Sébastien Loeb during the rally.
- Host country: Portugal
- Rally base: Faro, Portugal
- Dates run: March 29 – April 1, 2007
- Stages: 18 (357.1 km; 221.9 miles)
- Stage surface: Gravel
- Overall distance: 1,009.31 km (627.16 miles)

Statistics
- Crews: 80 at start, 61 at finish

Overall results
- Overall winner: (France) Sébastien Loeb (France) Citroën Total World Rally Team

The 2007 Vodafone Rally de Portugal was the 41st Rally de Portugal and the fifth round of the 2007 World Rally Championship season. It took place between March 30–April 1, 2007 and consisted of 18 special stages. 61 drivers finished the rally and the winner was Citroën's Sébastien Loeb, followed by Subaru's Petter Solberg and Citroën's Dani Sordo.

All Ford Focus RS WRC 06 drivers were given five-minute time penalties, because the glass used in the cars' rear side windows was 0.5 mm too thin. This dropped Marcus Grönholm from second to fourth, Mikko Hirvonen from third to fifth, Jari-Matti Latvala from sixth to eighth and Henning Solberg from ninth to 11th.

== Results ==
Pos.	Driver	Co-driver	Car	Time	Difference	Points
WRC
1.	(France) Sébastien Loeb	(Monaco) Daniel Elena	Citroën C4 WRC	3:53:33.1	0.0	10
2.	(Norway) Petter Solberg	(United Kingdom) Phil Mills	Subaru Impreza WRC	3:56:47.0	3:13.9	8
3.	(Spain) Daniel Sordo	(Spain) Marc Marti	Citroën C4 WRC	3:58:38.4	5:05.3	6
4.	(Finland) Marcus Grönholm	(Finland) Timo Rautiainen	Ford Focus RS WRC 06	3:59:10.2 ^{[1]}	5:37.1	5
5.	(Finland) Mikko Hirvonen	(Finland) Jarmo Lehtinen	Ford Focus RS WRC 06	4:00:41.2 ^{[1]}	7:08.1	4
6.	(Sweden) Daniel Carlsson	(France) Denis Giraudet	Citroën Xsara WRC	4:01:46.3	8:13.2	3
7.	(Italy) Gian-Luigi Galli	(Italy) Giovanni Bernacchni	Citroën Xsara WRC	4:03:12.7	9:39.6	2
8.	(Finland) Jari-Matti Latvala	(Finland) Miikka Anttila	Ford Focus RS WRC 06	4:04:18.0 ^{[1]}	10:44.9	1
^{[1]} — All Ford Focus RS WRC 06 drivers were given five-minute time penalties due to 0.5 mm too thin rear side windows.
JRC
1. (14.)	(Sweden) Per-Gunner Andersson	(Sweden) Jonas Andersson	Suzuki Swift S1600	4:22:43.4	0.0	10
2. (15.)	(Estonia) Urmo Aava	(Estonia) Kuldar Sikk	Suzuki Swift S1600	4:22:47.1	3.7	8
3. (18.)	(Slovakia) Jozef Béreš jun.	(Czech Republic) Petr Starý	Renault Clio S1600	4:30:32.3	7:48.9	6
4. (21.)	(Estonia) Jaan Mölder jr.	(Germany) Katrin Becker	Suzuki Swift S1600	4:34.39.9	11:56.5	5
5. (22.)	(Italy) Andrea Cortinovis	(Italy) Flavio Zanella	Renault Clio S1600	4:37.37.2	14:53.8	4
6. (26.)	(Spain) Manuel Rueda	(Spain) Borja Rozada	Renault Clio R3	4:43:38.1	20:54.7	3
7. (30.)	(Republic of Ireland) Shaun Gallagher	(United Kingdom) Clive Jenkins	Citroën C2 S1600	4:49:23.3	26:39.9	2
8. (32.)	(Lithuania) Vilius Rožukas	(Lithuania) Audrius Šošas	Suzuki Swift S1600	4:55:58.3 ^{[2]}	33:14.9	1
				^{[2]} — Drivers using SupeRally		

== Retirements ==
- (Argentina) Luís Pérez Companc - retired before SS1;
- (Argentina) Juan Pablo Raies - retired before SS1;
- (United Kingdom) Guy Wilks - rolled (SS3);
- (Czech Republic) Martin Prokop - mechanical (SS5);
- (Norway) Mads Østberg - retired after first leg (SS7/8);
- (Finland) Toni Gardemeister - excluded for driving on three wheels.
- (Poland) Michał Kościuszko - went off the road (SS9);
- (Australia) Chris Atkinson - went off the road (SS10);

== Special Stages ==
All dates and times are WEST (UTC+1).

Leg	Stage	Time	Name	Length	Winner	Time	Avg. spd.	Rally leader
1 (29 Mar - 30 Mar)	SS1	17:35	SSS Estadio Algarve	2.20 km	(Finland) M. Grönholm	2:05.8	62.96 km/h	(Finland) M. Grönholm
1 (29 Mar - 30 Mar)	SS2	10:27	Tavira 1	19.92 km	(Finland) M. Hirvonen	14:07.5	84.62 km/h	(Finland) M. Grönholm
1 (29 Mar - 30 Mar)	SS3	11:27	Serra de Tavira 1	24.37 km	(Finland) M. Grönholm	16:30.1	88.61 km/h	(Finland) M. Grönholm
1 (29 Mar - 30 Mar)	SS4	12:15	S. Bras de Alportel 1	16.70 km	(France) S. Loeb	11:24.3	87.86 km/h	(Finland) M. Grönholm
1 (29 Mar - 30 Mar)	SS5	14:44	Tavira 2	19.92 km	(Finland) M. Grönholm	13:52.3	86.16 km/h	(Finland) M. Grönholm
1 (29 Mar - 30 Mar)	SS6	15:44	Serra de Tavira 2	24.37 km	(France) S. Loeb	16:10.2	90.43 km/h	(Finland) M. Grönholm
1 (29 Mar - 30 Mar)	SS7	16:32	S. Bras de Alportel 2	16.70 km	(France) S. Loeb	11:10.6	89.65 km/h	(France) S. Loeb
2 (31 Mar)	SS8	09:48	Silves / Ourique 1	30.69 km	(France) S. Loeb	21:36.5	85.22 km/h	(France) S. Loeb
2 (31 Mar)	SS9	10:37	Ourique 1	24.87 km	(France) S. Loeb	14:59.9	99.49 km/h	(France) S. Loeb
2 (31 Mar)	SS10	11:32	Almodóvar 1	20.88 km	(France) S. Loeb	11:40.5	107.31 km/h	(France) S. Loeb
2 (31 Mar)	SS11	14:50	Silves / Ourique 2	30.69 km	(France) S. Loeb	20:16.0	90.86 km/h	(France) S. Loeb
2 (31 Mar)	SS12	15:39	Ourique 2	24.87 km	(France) S. Loeb	14:35.0	102.32 km/h	(France) S. Loeb
2 (31 Mar)	SS13	16:34	Almodóvar 2	20.88 km	(France) S. Loeb	11:38.6	107.6 km/h	(France) S. Loeb
3 (1 Apr)	SS14	08:07	Loule / Almodóvar 1	17.60 km	(Finland) M. Hirvonen	11:18.0	93.45 km/h	(France) S. Loeb
3 (1 Apr)	SS15	08:39	Loule 1	22.70 km	(France) S. Loeb	14:09.3	96.22 km/h	(France) S. Loeb
3 (1 Apr)	SS16	11:42	Loule / Almodóvar 2	17.60 km	(Finland) M. Grönholm	11:11.1	94.41 km/h	(France) S. Loeb
3 (1 Apr)	SS17	12:14	Loule 2	22.70 km	(Finland) M. Grönholm	14:02.0	97.05 km/h	(France) S. Loeb
3 (1 Apr)	SS18	14:00	Estadio Algarve 2	2.20 km	(France) S. Loeb	2:06.8	62.46 km/h	(France) S. Loeb

== Championship standings after the event ==
=== Drivers' championship ===
Pos	Driver	MON (Monaco)	SWE (Sweden)	NOR (Norway)	MEX (Mexico)	POR (Portugal)	ARG (Argentina)	ITA (Italy)	GRC (Greece)	FIN (Finland)	GER (Germany)	NZL (New Zealand)	ESP (Spain)	FRA (France)	JPN (Japan)	IRL (Republic of Ireland)	GBR (United Kingdom)	Pts
1	(France) Sébastien Loeb	1	2	14	1	1												38
2	(Finland) Marcus Grönholm	3	1	2	2	4												37
3	(Finland) Mikko Hirvonen	5	3	1	3	5												30
4	(Spain) Dani Sordo	2	12	25	4	3												19
5	(Norway) Petter Solberg	6	Ret	4	Ret	2												16
6	(Norway) Henning Solberg	14	4	3	9	11												11
7	(Australia) Chris Atkinson	4	8	19	5	Ret												10
8	(Sweden) Daniel Carlsson		5	7		6												9
9	(Finland) Jari-Matti Latvala	Ret	Ret	5	7	8												7
10	(Finland) Toni Gardemeister	7	6	Ret		DSQ												5
10	(Austria) Manfred Stohl	10	7	12	6	10												5
10	(Italy) Gigi Galli		13	6		7												5
13	(Czech Republic) Jan Kopecký	8	10	8		22												2
14	(United Kingdom) Matthew Wilson	12	Ret	26	8	12												1
Pos	Driver	MON (Monaco)	SWE (Sweden)	NOR (Norway)	MEX (Mexico)	POR (Portugal)	ARG (Argentina)	ITA (Italy)	GRC (Greece)	FIN (Finland)	GER (Germany)	NZL (New Zealand)	ESP (Spain)	FRA (France)	JPN (Japan)	IRL (Republic of Ireland)	GBR (United Kingdom)	Pts

Key
Colour	Result
Gold	Winner
Silver	2nd place
Bronze	3rd place
Green	Points finish
Blue	Non-points finish
Blue	Non-classified finish (NC)
Purple	Did not finish (Ret)
Black	Excluded (EX)
Black	Disqualified (DSQ)
White	Did not start (DNS)
White	Cancelled (C)
Blank	Withdrew entry from the event (WD)

=== Manufacturers' championship ===
Rank	Manufacturer	Event																Total points
Rank	Manufacturer	MON (Monaco)	SWE (Sweden)	NOR (Norway)	MEX (Mexico)	POR (Portugal)	ARG (Argentina)	ITA (Italy)	GRC (Greece)	FIN (Finland)	GER (Germany)	NZL (New Zealand)	ESP (Spain)	FRA (France)	JPN (Japan)	IRL (Republic of Ireland)	GBR (United Kingdom)	Total points
1	BP Ford World Rally Team	10	16	18	14	9	-	-	-	-	-	-	-	-	-	-	-	67
2	Citroën Total World Rally Team	18	9	1	15	16	-	-	-	-	-	-	-	-	-	-	-	59
3	Subaru World Rally Team	8	2	5	4	8	-	-	-	-	-	-	-	-	-	-	-	27
4	Stobart VK M-Sport Ford	1	5	10	3	2	-	-	-	-	-	-	-	-	-	-	-	21
4	OMV Kronos	2	7	5	3	4	-	-	-	-	-	-	-	-	-	-	-	21
6	Munchi's Ford World Rally Team		0		0		-	-	-	-	-	-	-	-	-	-	-	0
