= 2007 Rally d'Italia Sardegna =

Rallying motorsport event

2007 Rally d'Italia Sardegna 4º Supermag Rally Italia Sardinia
Round 7 of the 2007 World Rally Championship
← Previous event	Next event →
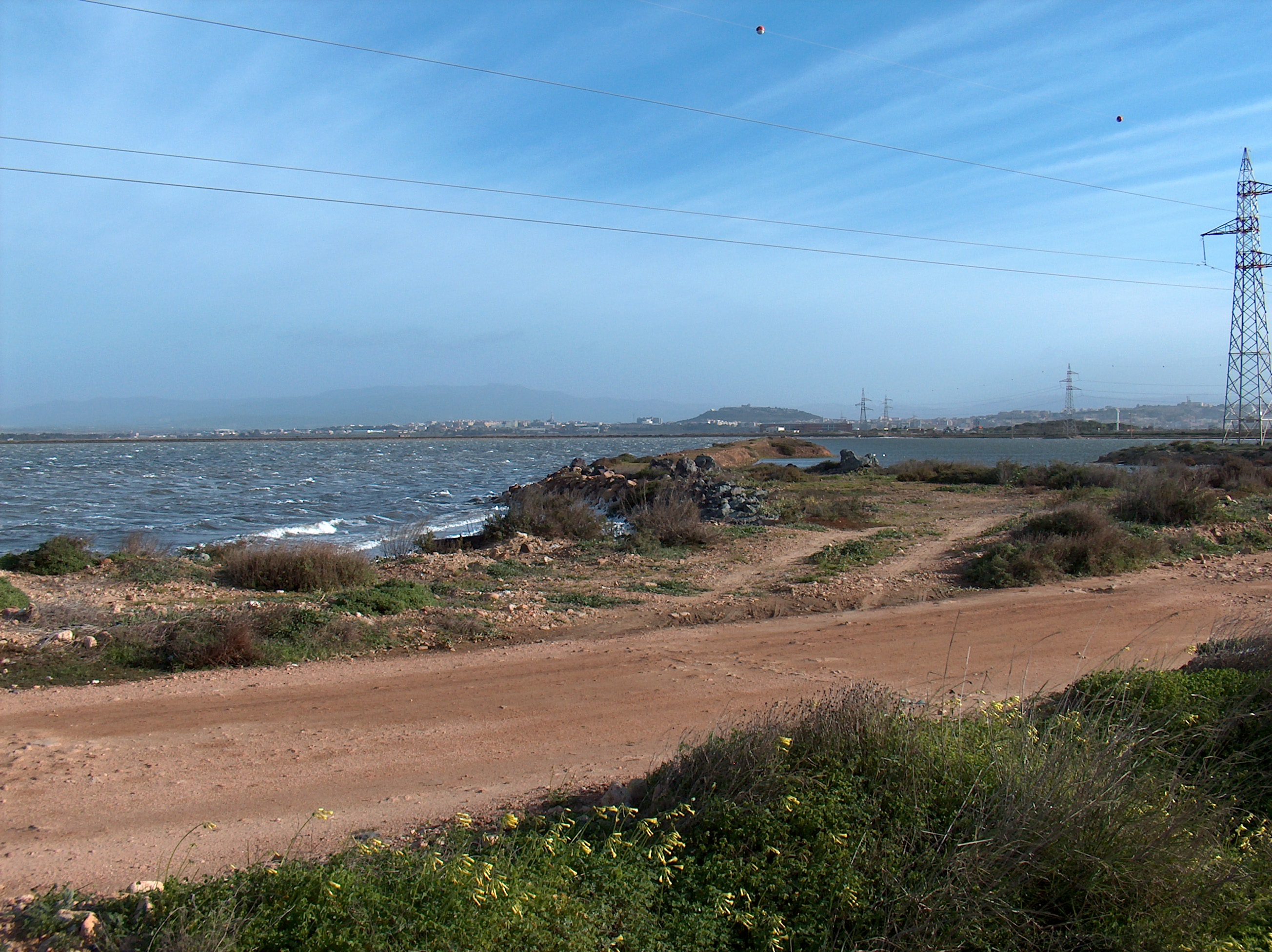
- Typical gravel road on Sardinia.
- Host country: Italy
- Rally base: Olbia, Italy
- Dates run: May 18 – 20 2007
- Stages: 18 (342.86 km; 213.04 miles)
- Stage surface: Gravel
- Overall distance: 1,061.84 km (659.80 miles)

Statistics
- Crews: 82 at start, 67 at finish

Overall results
- Overall winner: (Finland) Marcus Grönholm (United Kingdom) BP Ford World Rally Team

Results of Rally d'Italia Sardegna (4º Supermag Rally Italia Sardinia), 7th round of 2007 World Rally Championship, was run on May 18–20:

== Results ==
Pos.	Driver	Co-driver	Car	Time	Difference	Points
WRC
1.	(Finland) Marcus Grönholm	(Finland) Timo Rautiainen	Ford Focus RS WRC 06	3:48:42.0	0.0	10
2.	(Finland) Mikko Hirvonen	(Finland) Jarmo Lehtinen	Ford Focus RS WRC 06	3:49:11.2	29.2	8
3.	(Spain) Daniel Sordo	(Spain) Marc Marti	Citroën C4 WRC	3:50:03.8	1:21.8	6
4.	(Norway) Henning Solberg	(Norway) Cato Menkerud	Ford Focus RS WRC 06	3:50:18.6	1:36.6	5
5.	(Norway) Petter Solberg	(United Kingdom) Phil Mills	Subaru Impreza WRC 07	3:51:16.2	2:34.2	4
6.	(Finland) Toni Gardemeister	(Finland) Jakke Honkanen	Mitsubishi Lancer WRC05	3:53:44.1	5:02.1	3
7.	(Austria) Manfred Stohl	(Austria) Ilka Minor	Citroën Xsara WRC	3:54:10.6	5:28.6	2
8.	(Finland) Juho Hänninen	(Finland) Mikko Markkula	Mitsubishi Lancer WRC05	3:58:13.7	9:31.7	1
JWRC
1. (13.)	(Estonia) Urmo Aava	(Estonia) Kuldar Sikk	Suzuki Swift S1600	4:15:03.9	0.0	10
2. (14.)	(Sweden) Per-Gunnar Andersson	(Sweden) Jonas Andersson	Suzuki Swift S1600	4:16:13.3	1:09.4	8
3. (16.)	(Czech Republic) Martin Prokop	(Czech Republic) Jan Tománek	Citroën C2 S1600	4:21:26.7	6:22.8	6
4. (18.)	(Germany) Aaron Burkart	(Germany) Michael Kölbach	Citroën C2 S1600	4:24:13.8	9:09.9	5
5. (19.)	(Estonia) Jaan Mölder jr.	(Germany) Katrin Becker	Suzuki Swift S1600	4:24:44.2	9:40.3	4
6. (25.)	(Slovakia) Jozef Béreš jun.	(Czech Republic) Petr Starý	Renault Clio S1600	4:30:15.0	15:11.1	3
7. (29.)	(France) Bryan Bouffier	(France) Matthieu Baumel	Citroën C2 R2	4:35:02.8	19:58.9	2
8. (31.)	(Sweden) Patrik Sandell	(Sweden) Emil Axelsson	Renault Clio 16S	4:37:43.1 ^{[1]}	22:39.2	1
				^{[1]} — Drivers using SuperRally		

== Retirements ==
- (Sweden) Daniel Carlsson - withdrew right after official rally start, before SS1;
- (Republic of Ireland) Gareth MacHale - stopped in stage (SS8);
- (Norway) Mads Østberg - stopped in stage (SS8);
- (Argentina) Luís Pérez Companc - went off the road (SS8);
- (Czech Republic) Jan Kopecký - steering problems (SS12);
- (France) Sébastien Loeb - went off the road (SS13);

== Special Stages ==
All dates and times are CEST (UTC+2).

Leg	Stage	Time	Name	Length	Winner	Time	Avg. spd.	Rally leader
1 (18 May)	SS1	09:43	Crastazza 1	31.12 km	(Finland) J. Latvala	21:27.8	86.99 km/h	(Finland) J. Latvala
1 (18 May)	SS2	10:58	Terranova 1	21.20 km	(France) S.Loeb	15:14.9	83.42 km/h	(Finland) J. Latvala
1 (18 May)	SS3	11:34	Monte Olia 1	20.36 km	(Norway) H. Solberg	14:52.7	82.11 km/h	(Finland) J. Latvala
1 (18 May)	SS4	14:53	Crastazza 2	31.12 km	(Finland) M. Grönholm	20:51.9	89.49 km/h	(Finland) M. Grönholm
1 (18 May)	SS5	16:08	Terranova 2	21.20 km	(France) S.Loeb	14:44.9	86.25 km/h	(Finland) M. Grönholm
1 (18 May)	SS6	16:44	Monte Olia 2	20.36 km	(France) S.Loeb	14:30.9	84.16 km/h	(France) S.Loeb
2 (19 May)	SS7	09:25	Loelle 1	22.56 km	(France) S.Loeb	13:40.6	98.97 km/h	(France) S.Loeb
2 (19 May)	SS8	10:25	Monte Lerno 1	29.30 km	(France) S.Loeb	19:23.3	90.67 km/h	(France) S.Loeb
2 (19 May)	SS9	11:10	Su Filigosu 1	19.47 km	(France) S.Loeb	12:36.3	92.68 km/h	(France) S.Loeb
2 (19 May)	SS10	14:45	Loelle 2	22.56 km	(Finland) M. Grönholm	13:31.6	100.07 km/h	(France) S.Loeb
2 (19 May)	SS11	15:45	Mento Lerno 2	29.30 km	(France) S.Loeb	18:58.7	92.63 km/h	(France) S.Loeb
2 (19 May)	SS12	16:30	Su Filigosu 2	19.47 km	(Finland) M. Grönholm	12:19.3	94.81 km/h	(France) S.Loeb
3 (20 May)	SS13	07:55	S. Giovanni 1	10.65 km	(Finland) M. Hirvonen	7:21.9	86.76 km/h	(Finland) M. Grönholm
3 (20 May)	SS14	09:06	Monte Nuragone 1	7.67 km	(Norway) H. Solberg	5:37.3	81.86 km/h	(Finland) M. Grönholm
3 (20 May)	SS15	09:50	Braniatogghiu 1	9.30 km	(Finland) M. Hirvonen	4:38.0	120.43 km/h	(Finland) M. Grönholm
3 (20 May)	SS16	10:57	S. Giovanni 2	10.65 km	(Spain) D. Sordo	7:06.4	89.92 km/h	(Finland) M. Grönholm
3 (20 May)	SS17	12:08	Monte Nuragone 2	7.67 km	(Norway) H. Solberg	5:29.4	83.83 km/h	(Finland) M. Grönholm
3 (20 May)	SS18	12:52	Braniatogghiu 2	9.30 km	(Finland) M. Hirvonen	4:31.3	123.41 km/h	(Finland) M. Grönholm

== Championship standings after the event ==
=== Drivers' championship ===
Pos	Driver	MON (Monaco)	SWE (Sweden)	NOR (Norway)	MEX (Mexico)	POR (Portugal)	ARG (Argentina)	ITA (Italy)	GRC (Greece)	FIN (Finland)	GER (Germany)	NZL (New Zealand)	ESP (Spain)	FRA (France)	JPN (Japan)	IRL (Republic of Ireland)	GBR (United Kingdom)	Pts
1	(Finland) Marcus Grönholm	3	1	2	2	4	2	1										55
2	(France) Sébastien Loeb	1	2	14	1	1	1	Ret										48
3	(Finland) Mikko Hirvonen	5	3	1	3	5	3	2										44
4	(Spain) Dani Sordo	2	12	25	4	3	6	3										28
5	(Norway) Petter Solberg	6	Ret	4	Ret	2	Ret	5										20
5	(Norway) Henning Solberg	14	4	3	9	11	5	4										20
7	(Australia) Chris Atkinson	4	8	19	5	Ret	7	10										12
7	(Finland) Jari-Matti Latvala	Ret	Ret	5	7	8	4	9										12
9	(Sweden) Daniel Carlsson		5	7		6		Ret										9
10	(Finland) Toni Gardemeister	7	6	Ret		DSQ		6										8
10	(Austria) Manfred Stohl	10	7	12	6	10	8	7										8
12	(Italy) Gigi Galli		13	6		7												5
13	(Czech Republic) Jan Kopecký	8	10	8		22		Ret										2
14	(United Kingdom) Matthew Wilson	12	Ret	26	8	12	30	12										1
14	(Finland) Juho Hänninen		DSQ	17			11	8										1
Pos	Driver	MON (Monaco)	SWE (Sweden)	NOR (Norway)	MEX (Mexico)	POR (Portugal)	ARG (Argentina)	ITA (Italy)	GRC (Greece)	FIN (Finland)	GER (Germany)	NZL (New Zealand)	ESP (Spain)	FRA (France)	JPN (Japan)	IRL (Republic of Ireland)	GBR (United Kingdom)	Pts

Key
Colour	Result
Gold	Winner
Silver	2nd place
Bronze	3rd place
Green	Points finish
Blue	Non-points finish
Blue	Non-classified finish (NC)
Purple	Did not finish (Ret)
Black	Excluded (EX)
Black	Disqualified (DSQ)
White	Did not start (DNS)
White	Cancelled (C)
Blank	Withdrew entry from the event (WD)

=== Manufacturers' championship ===
Rank	Manufacturer	Event																Total points
Rank	Manufacturer	MON (Monaco)	SWE (Sweden)	NOR (Norway)	MEX (Mexico)	POR (Portugal)	ARG (Argentina)	ITA (Italy)	GRC (Greece)	FIN (Finland)	GER (Germany)	NZL (New Zealand)	ESP (Spain)	FRA (France)	JPN (Japan)	IRL (Republic of Ireland)	GBR (United Kingdom)	Total points
1	BP Ford World Rally Team	10	16	18	14	9	14	18	-	-	-	-	-	-	-	-	-	99
2	Citroën Total World Rally Team	18	9	1	15	16	13	6	-	-	-	-	-	-	-	-	-	78
3	Stobart VK M-Sport Ford	1	5	10	3	2	9	7	-	-	-	-	-	-	-	-	-	37
4	Subaru World Rally Team	8	2	5	4	8	2	5	-	-	-	-	-	-	-	-	-	34
5	OMV Kronos	2	7	5	3	4	1	3	-	-	-	-	-	-	-	-	-	25
6	Munchi's Ford World Rally Team		0		0		0	0	-	-	-	-	-	-	-	-	-	0
