= 2007 Rally Finland =

Motor rally competition

2007 Rally Finland 57th Neste Oil Rally Finland
Round 9 of the 2007 World Rally Championship
← Previous event	Next event →
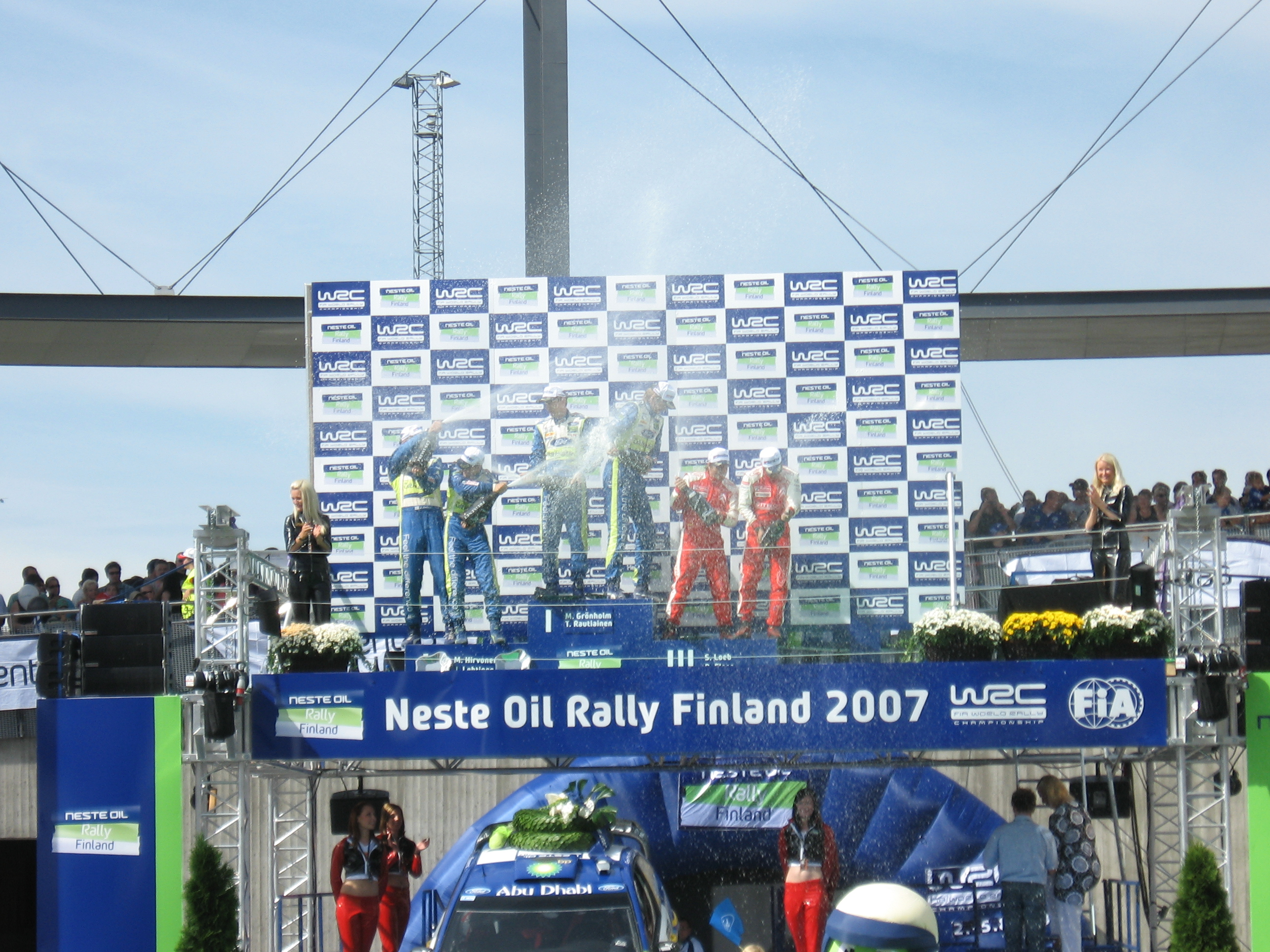
- Celebrations on the podium.
- Host country: Finland
- Rally base: Jyväskylä, Finland
- Dates run: August 2 – 5 2007
- Stages: 23 (360.34 km; 223.90 miles)
- Stage surface: Gravel
- Overall distance: 1,375.15 km (854.48 miles)

Statistics
- Crews: 97 at start, 70 at finish

Overall results
- Overall winner: (Finland) Marcus Grönholm (United Kingdom) BP Ford World Rally Team

The 57th Neste Oil Rally Finland was the 9th round of the 2007 World Rally Championship. It was run on 2–5 August 2007 and based in Jyväskylä, Finland.

== Results ==
Pos.	Driver	Co-driver	Car	Time	Difference	Points
WRC
1.	(Finland) Marcus Grönholm	(Finland) Timo Rautiainen	Ford Focus RS WRC 07	2:57:26.1	0.0	10
2.	(Finland) Mikko Hirvonen	(Finland) Jarmo Lehtinen	Ford Focus RS WRC 07	2:57:50.3	24.2	8
3.	(France) Sébastien Loeb	(Monaco) Daniel Elena	Citroën C4 WRC	2:58:36.0	1:09.9	6
4.	(Australia) Chris Atkinson	(Belgium) Stéphane Prévot	Subaru Impreza WRC 07	3:00:28.9	3:02.8	5
5.	(Norway) Henning Solberg	(Norway) Cato Menkerud	Ford Focus RS WRC 06	3:01:55.5	4:29.4	4
6.	(Spain) Xavier Pons	(Spain) Xavier Amigo	Subaru Impreza WRC	3:04:26.6	7:00.5	3
7.	(Estonia) Urmo Aava	(Estonia) Kuldar Sikk	Mitsubishi Lancer WRC05	3:05:05.7	7:39.6	2
8.	(Norway) Mads Østberg	(Norway) Ole Kristian Unnerud	Subaru Impreza WRC	3:06:58.0	9:31.9	1
JRC
1. (18.)	(Sweden) Patrik Sandell	(Sweden) Emil Axelsson	Renault Clio R3	3:25:14.5	0.0	10
2. (19.)	(Finland) Kalle Pinomäki	(Finland) Tuomo Nikkola	Renault Clio R3	3:26:33.6	1:19.1	8
3. (22.)	(Poland) Michał Kościuszko	(Poland) Maciej Szczepaniak	Renault Clio S1600	3:29:28.2	4:13.7	6
4. (23.)	(Zimbabwe) Conrad Rautenbach	(United Kingdom) David Senior	Citroën C2 S1600	3:29:46.3	4:31.8	5
5. (25.)	(Finland) Tapio Suominen	(Finland) Jarno Ottman	Suzuki Swift S1600	3:31:00.9	5:46.4	4
6. (30.)	(Lithuania) Vilius Rožukas	(Lithuania) Audrius Šošas	Suzuki Swift S1600	3:34:29.0 ^{[1]}	9:14.5	3
7. (32.)	(Italy) Alessandro Bettega	(Italy) Simone Scattolin	Ford Fiesta S1600	3:37:43.0 ^{[1]}	12:28.5	2
8. (33.)	(France) Yoann Bonato	(France) Benjamin Boulloud	Citroën C2 R2	3:38:20.3	13:05.8	1
				^{[1]} — Drivers using SupeRally		

== Retirements ==
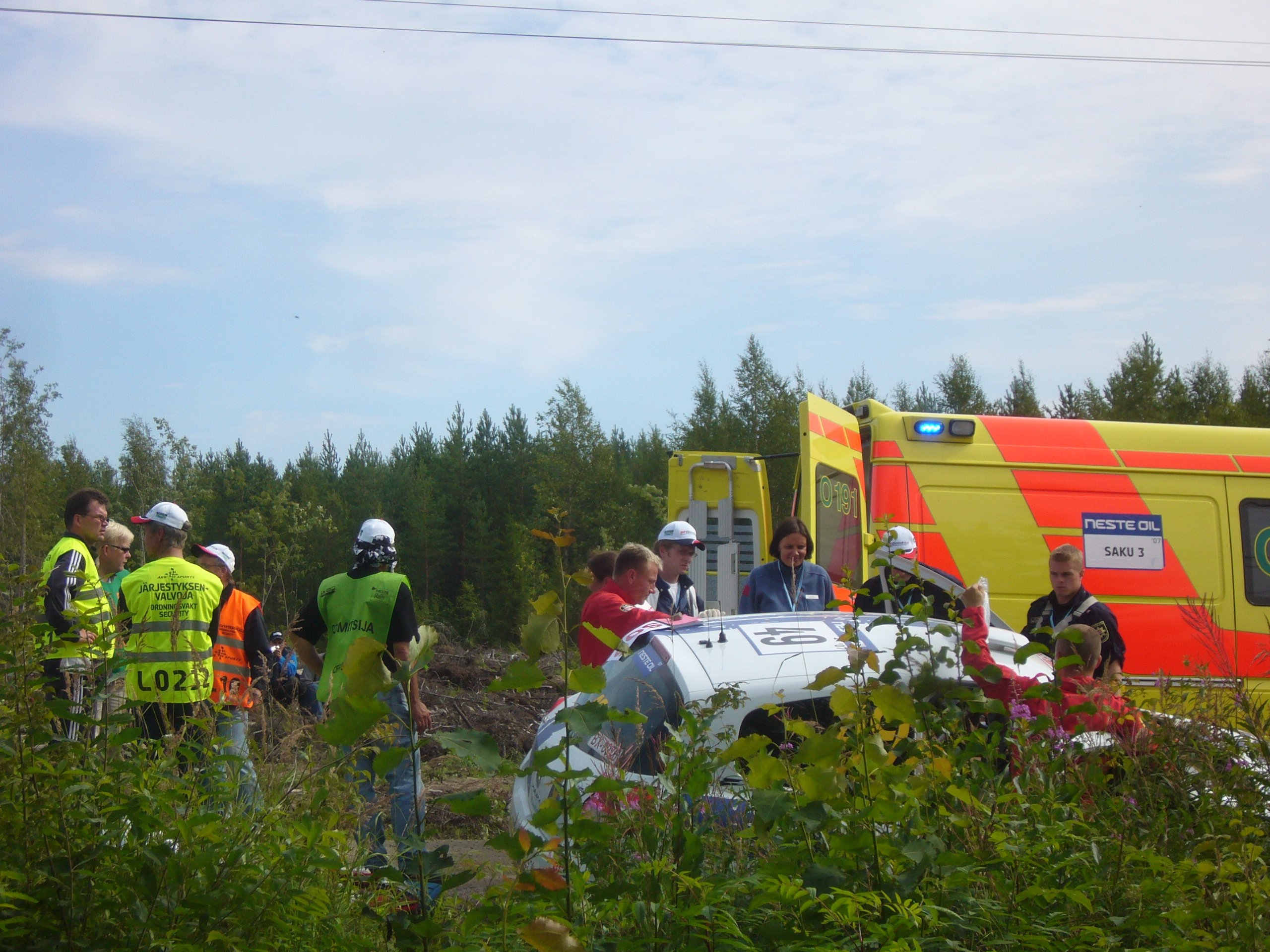
Milos Komljenovic had to retire after a bad landing from a jump on SS7.

- (Finland) Kristian Sohlberg - rolled (SS2);
- (Finland) Jari-Matti Latvala - went off the road - damaged rollcage (SS7);
- (Austria) Manfred Stohl - rolled (SS13)
- (United Kingdom) Gareth Jones - went off the road (SS13)
- (Finland) Juho Hänninen - mechanical (SS14)
- (Spain) Daniel Sordo - engine failure (SS15)
- (Norway) Petter Solberg - steering problems (SS15/16)
- (Czech Republic) Jan Kopecký - went off the road (SS21)

== Special Stages ==
Leg	Stage	Time (EEST)	Name	Length	Winner	Time	Avg. spd.	Rally leader
1 (2/3 Aug)	SS1	20:00	Killeri 1	2.50 km	(Australia) C. Atkinson	1:20.6	111.66 km/h	(Australia) C. Atkinson
1 (2/3 Aug)	SS2	07:54	Vellipohja 1	17.20 km	(Finland) J. Latvala	8:18.7	124.16 km/h	(Finland) J. Latvala
1 (2/3 Aug)	SS3	08:50	Mökkiperä 1	13.72 km	(Finland) M. Grönholm	6:47.5	121.21 km/h	(Finland) M. Grönholm
1 (2/3 Aug)	SS4	09:29	Palsankylä 1	13.31 km	(Finland) M. Hirvonen	6:47.4	117.61 km/h	(Finland) M. Hirvonen
1 (2/3 Aug)	SS5	12:06	Vellipohja 2	17.20 km	(Finland) M. Grönholm	8:10.1	126.34 km/h	(Finland) M. Grönholm
1 (2/3 Aug)	SS6	13:02	Mökkiperä 2	13.72 km	(Finland) M. Hirvonen (Finland) M. Grönholm	6:42.7	122.65 km/h	(Finland) M. Grönholm
1 (2/3 Aug)	SS7	13:41	Palsankylä 2	13.31 km	(Finland) M. Grönholm	6:36.1	120.97 km/h	(Finland) M. Grönholm
1 (2/3 Aug)	SS8	16:21	Urria	9.96 km	(Finland) M. Grönholm	4:36.6	129.63 km/h	(Finland) M. Grönholm
1 (2/3 Aug)	SS9	16:51	Lautaperä	8.69 km	(Finland) M. Grönholm	3:56.7	132.17 km/h	(Finland) M. Grönholm
1 (2/3 Aug)	SS10	17:29	Jukojärvi	22.25 km	(Finland) M. Grönholm	10:35.6	126.02 km/h	(Finland) M. Grönholm
1 (2/3 Aug)	SS11	20:00	Killeri 2	2.50 km	(Finland) M. Grönholm	1:20.7	111.52 km/h	(Finland) M. Grönholm
2 (4 Aug)	SS12	07:17	Kaipolanvuori	13.46 km	(France) S. Loeb	6:53.4	117.21 km/h	(Finland) M. Grönholm
2 (4 Aug)	SS13	08:30	Juupajoki	22.13 km	(Finland) M. Grönholm	11:19.3	117.28 km/h	(Finland) M. Grönholm
2 (4 Aug)	SS14	09:14	Ouninpohja 1	33.00 km	(Finland) M. Grönholm	15:35.3	127.02 km/h	(Finland) M. Grönholm
2 (4 Aug)	SS15	12:15	Leustu	21.27 km	(Finland) M. Grönholm	10:12.6	124.99 km/h	(Finland) M. Grönholm
2 (4 Aug)	SS16	13:24	Ouninpohja 2	33.00 km	(Finland) M. Grönholm	15:19.8	129.16 km/h	(Finland) M. Grönholm
2 (4 Aug)	SS17	15:10	Ehikki 1	14.88 km	(Finland) M. Grönholm	6:52.2	129.96 km/h	(Finland) M. Grönholm
2 (4 Aug)	SS18	16:23	Himos	18.55 km	(Finland) M. Grönholm	10:09.8	109.51 km/h	(Finland) M. Grönholm
2 (4 Aug)	SS19	17:19	Ehikki 2	14.88 km	(Finland) M. Hirvonen	6:47.4	131.49 km/h	(Finland) M. Grönholm
2 (4 Aug)	SS20	17:54	Surkee	14.89 km	(Finland) M. Hirvonen	8:13.6	108.6 km/h	(Finland) M. Grönholm
3 (5 Aug)	SS21	10:15	Valkola	10.38 km	(Finland) M. Grönholm	5:35.9	111.25 km/h	(Finland) M. Grönholm
3 (5 Aug)	SS22	11:07	Lankamaa	22.82 km	(Finland) M. Grönholm	11:07.2	123.13 km/h	(Finland) M. Grönholm
3 (5 Aug)	SS23	12:22	Ruuhimäki	7.53 km	(Finland) M. Grönholm	3:57.8	113.99 km/h	(Finland) M. Grönholm

== Championship standings after the event ==
=== Drivers' championship ===
Pos	Driver	MON (Monaco)	SWE (Sweden)	NOR (Norway)	MEX (Mexico)	POR (Portugal)	ARG (Argentina)	ITA (Italy)	GRC (Greece)	FIN (Finland)	GER (Germany)	NZL (New Zealand)	ESP (Spain)	FRA (France)	JPN (Japan)	IRL (Republic of Ireland)	GBR (United Kingdom)	Pts
1	(Finland) Marcus Grönholm	3	1	2	2	4	2	1	1	1								75
2	(France) Sébastien Loeb	1	2	14	1	1	1	Ret	2	3								62
3	(Finland) Mikko Hirvonen	5	3	1	3	5	3	2	4	2								57
4	(Spain) Dani Sordo	2	12	25	4	3	6	3	24	Ret								28
4	(Norway) Henning Solberg	14	4	3	9	11	5	4	5	5								28
6	(Norway) Petter Solberg	6	Ret	4	Ret	2	Ret	5	3	Ret								26
7	(Australia) Chris Atkinson	4	8	19	5	Ret	7	10	6	4								20
8	(Finland) Jari-Matti Latvala	Ret	Ret	5	7	8	4	9	12	Ret								12
9	(Sweden) Daniel Carlsson		5	7		6		Ret										9
9	(Austria) Manfred Stohl	10	7	12	6	10	8	7	8	Ret								9
11	(Finland) Toni Gardemeister	7	6	Ret		DSQ		6										8
12	(Italy) Gigi Galli		13	6		7												5
13	(Czech Republic) Jan Kopecký	8	10	8		22		Ret	7	Ret								4
14	(Spain) Xavier Pons	25	Ret	16						6								3
15	(Estonia) Urmo Aava			28		15		13	14	7								2
16	(United Kingdom) Matthew Wilson	12	Ret	26	8	12	30	12	10	10								1
16	(Finland) Juho Hänninen		DSQ	17			11	8	Ret	Ret								1
16	(Norway) Mads Østberg		9	37		Ret		Ret		8								1
Pos	Driver	MON (Monaco)	SWE (Sweden)	NOR (Norway)	MEX (Mexico)	POR (Portugal)	ARG (Argentina)	ITA (Italy)	GRC (Greece)	FIN (Finland)	GER (Germany)	NZL (New Zealand)	ESP (Spain)	FRA (France)	JPN (Japan)	IRL (Republic of Ireland)	GBR (United Kingdom)	Pts

Key
Colour	Result
Gold	Winner
Silver	2nd place
Bronze	3rd place
Green	Points finish
Blue	Non-points finish
Blue	Non-classified finish (NC)
Purple	Did not finish (Ret)
Black	Excluded (EX)
Black	Disqualified (DSQ)
White	Did not start (DNS)
White	Cancelled (C)
Blank	Withdrew entry from the event (WD)

=== Manufacturers' championship ===
Rank	Manufacturer	Event																Total points
Rank	Manufacturer	MON (Monaco)	SWE (Sweden)	NOR (Norway)	MEX (Mexico)	POR (Portugal)	ARG (Argentina)	ITA (Italy)	GRC (Greece)	FIN (Finland)	GER (Germany)	NZL (New Zealand)	ESP (Spain)	FRA (France)	JPN (Japan)	IRL (Republic of Ireland)	GBR (United Kingdom)	Total points
1	BP Ford World Rally Team	10	16	18	14	9	14	18	15	18	-	-	-	-	-	-	-	132
2	Citroën Total World Rally Team	18	9	1	15	16	13	6	8	6	-	-	-	-	-	-	-	92
3	Subaru World Rally Team	8	2	5	4	8	2	5	9	5	-	-	-	-	-	-	-	48
4	Stobart VK M-Sport Ford	1	5	10	3	2	9	7	4	4	-	-	-	-	-	-	-	45
5	OMV Kronos	2	7	5	3	4	1	3	2	0	-	-	-	-	-	-	-	27
6	Munchi's Ford World Rally Team		0		0		0	0	1	5	-	-	-	-	-	-	-	6
