= Proton R3 =

Automotive brand division

- Formerly: Proton PERT (1987–2002); Proton R3 (2003 onwards)
- Type: Division
- Industry: Automotive
- Founded: 2003; 23 years ago
- Defunct: 2017
- Headquarters: Shah Alam, Malaysia
- Products: High-performance cars Automobile parts
- Services: Automobile tuning
- Parent: Proton Holdings

Proton R3 was the motorsport and performance division of the Malaysian automotive brand Proton. The name R3, pronounced ar tiga in Malay, is an abbreviation of "Race. Rally. Research". By the end of May 2017, Proton announced that funds will be channeled to the company's core operations instead.

== History ==
Proton R3 was established in 2003 as a division of Proton. It was originally formed as a successor to Proton's motorsport division, Proton PERT which was active between 1987 and 2002. The former division was a collaboration between Petronas, Mitsubishi Motors' Ralliart and Edaran Otomobil Nasional (EON), to form Petronas EON Racing Team, or Proton PERT.

=== Proton PERT ===
Proton PERT was formed in 1987, as a way for Proton to gain exposure in the motorsport scene, especially that in rally racing. During this period, Proton worked closely with Mitsubishi's Ralliart to help specialise in their cars to take part in various races between 1991 and 2002. During its early years, Proton PERT was fairly successful, managing to gain success in the Group S rally with their Proton Iswara 4WD Turbo Group S between 1991 and 1994, and scoring a win during the 2002 Production World Rally Championship (PWRC), and also winning the Sepang 12 Hours in 2000.

=== Proton R3 ===
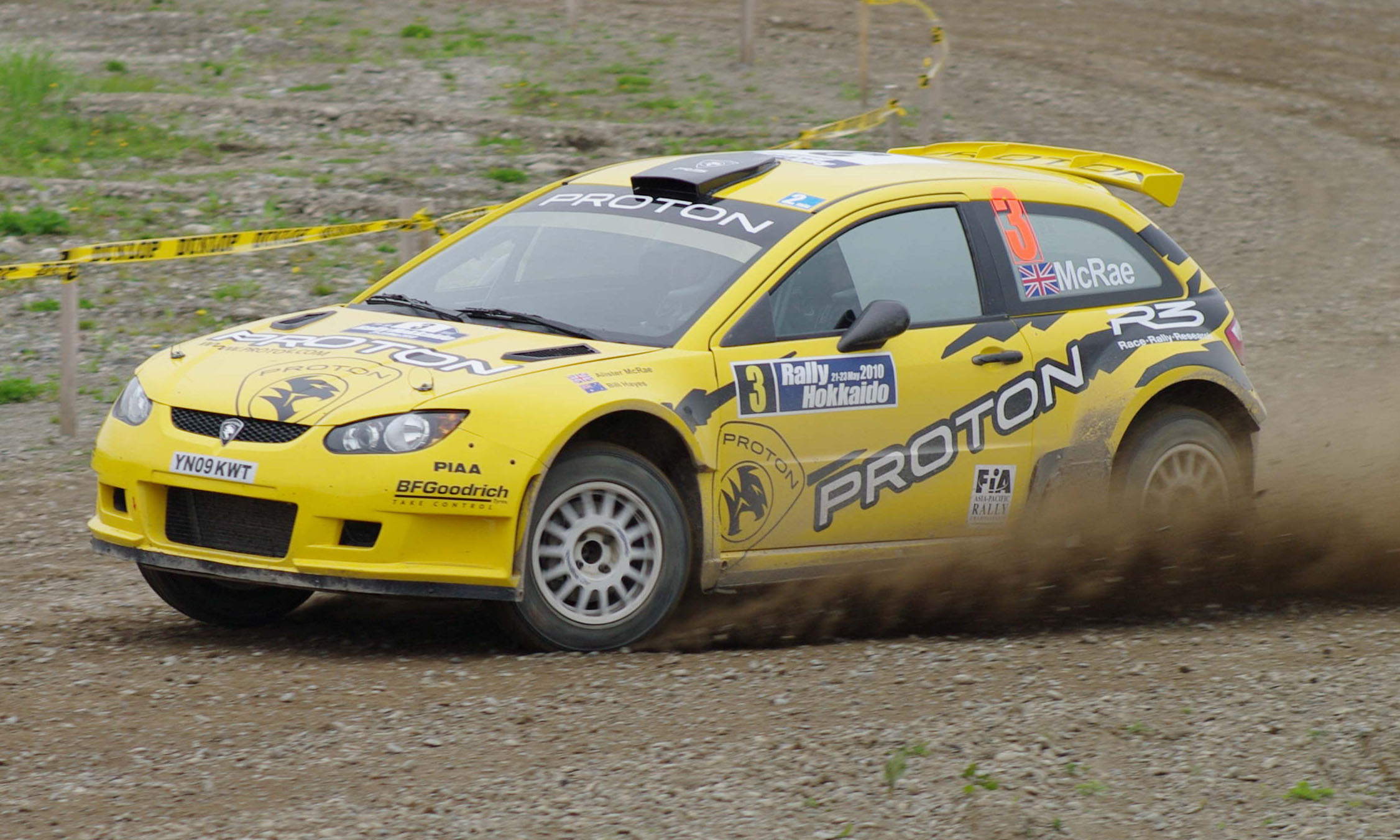
Proton Satria Neo S2000

After the formation of Proton R3 in Shah Alam, Selangor, it replaced Proton PERT in Proton's motorsport scene. Proton's new motorsport division continued to take part in championships with team partner, British based Mellors Elliot Motorsport (MEM), such as during the 2009 FIA's Asia-Pacific Rally Championship (APRC), and the Intercontinental Rally Challenge (IRC) with the Proton Satria Neo S2000, up till 2011.The team also won the Sepang 12 Hours again in 2005 and 2006.

During the 2009 IRC, Proton R3 finished in 2nd place during the 2009 Rally Scotland, with drivers Guy Wilks, Bryan Bouffier and Alister McRae, scoring 13 points.

During the 2010 Intercontinental Rally Challenge season, Proton R3 had many retirements and did not score a single point. The drivers were Alister McRae, Chris Atkinson, Niall McShea, Keith Cronin, Gilles Panizzi and a privateer with factory support, Tom Cave. The best result from the 2010 season was Gilles Panizzi securing 22nd place at the 2010 Rallye Sanremo, although it was the only finish for the Proton Satria Neo S2000 in that season.

In 2011, during the opening round of the 2011 IRC season, at the famous Rallye Monte Carlo, Proton entered two cars. Chris Atkinson retired during the first special stage and Per-Gunnar Andersson during the second special stage. Later that same year, Proton R3 managed to score a win at the China Rally, where it clinched the Asia-Pacific Rally Championship driver's and manufacturer's titles and capped off a dominant season for Proton R3.

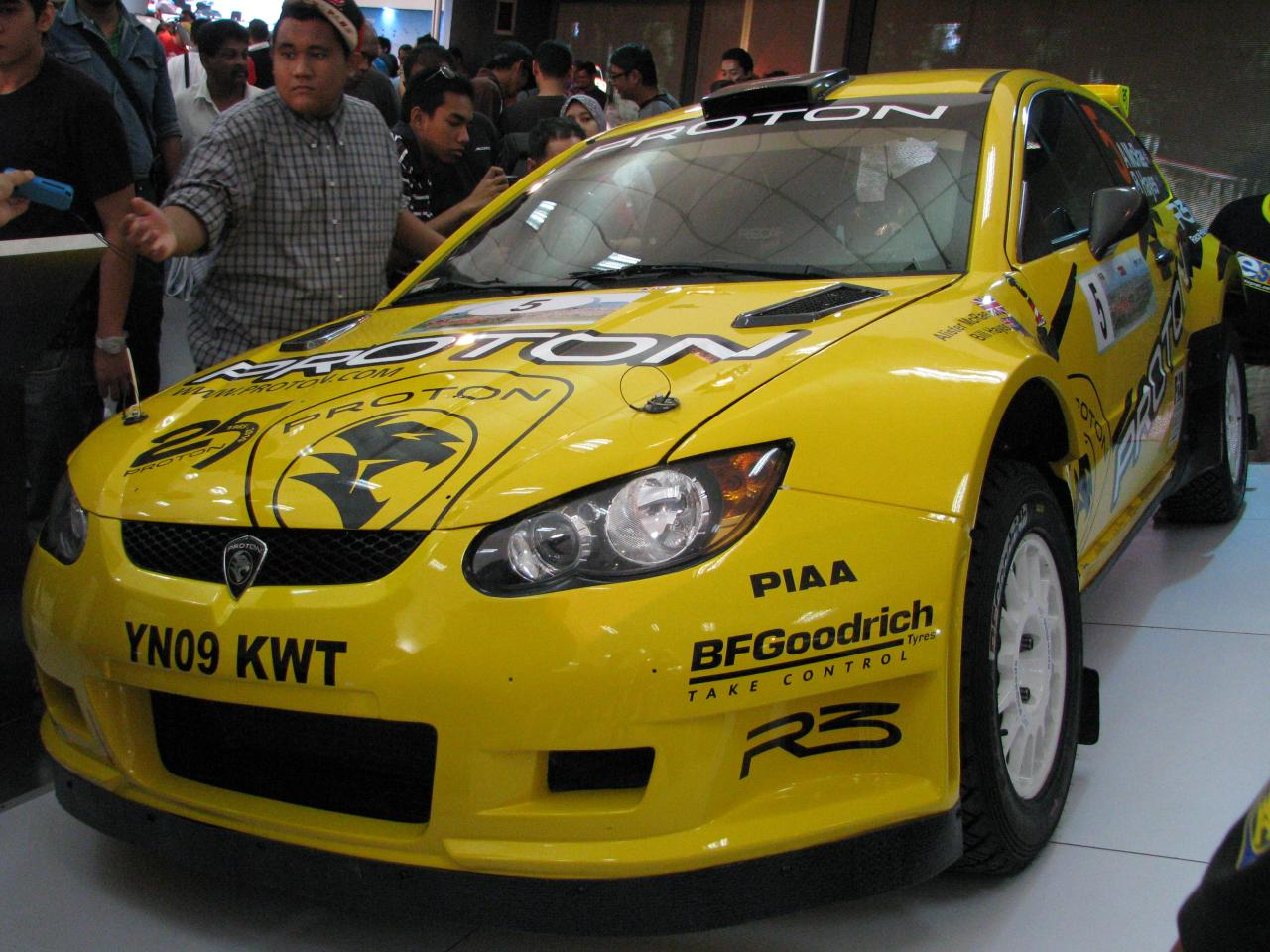
Proton Satria Neo S2000

Alister McRae continued to drive the Proton Satria Neo S2000 to its fourth victory of the season in six rounds when he completed the three-day China Rally, ahead of Finnish driver Jari Ketomaa in the Mitsubishi Lancer Evolution X, with teammate Chris Atkinson finishing third to make it an all Proton 1–2 in the APRC driver's championship. The Satria Neo S2000's dominant performance all year long also declared Proton the winner of the coveted APRC manufacturer's championship ahead of Mitsubishi and Subaru.

The results in China also saw Proton becoming the first car manufacturer to win all eight major individual titles in the FIA APRC which includes the overall FIA APRC driver's title, FIA APRC manufacturer's title, the FIA APRC Teams Trophy, the FIA Asia Cup driver's title, the FIA Pacific Cup driver's title, the manufacturer's title in the FIA APRC Rally Cup for two-wheel drive category, the FIA APRC Rally Cup two-wheel drive driver's title, and the FIA APRC Junior Cup driver's title.

== Models ==
Proton R3 was also responsible with the tuning and upgrade of certain Proton models, such as the Proton Satria, Proton Saga and the Proton Iriz.

=== Proton Satria R3 ===
==== First generation ====
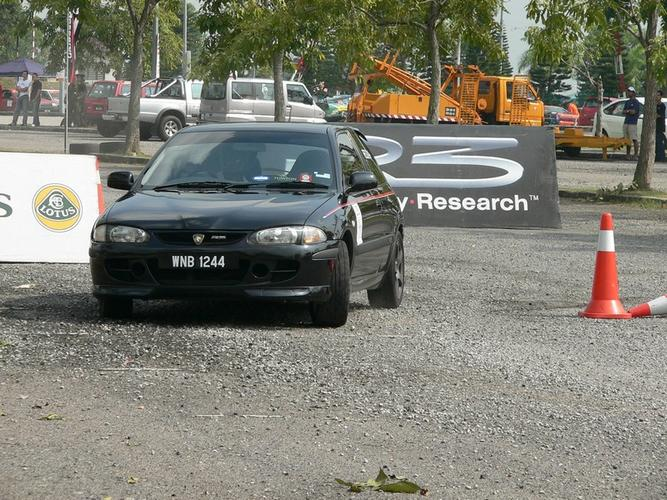
Proton Satria R3 (first generation)

The Proton Satria R3 was a limited edition, track-focused version of Proton's Satria hatchback, with only 150 units produced. It was a redefined version of the Satria GTi in collaboration with Lotus. Original Satria R3s utilised the same Mitsubishi-sourced 1.8-litre, inline-4 engine as the (albeit with a new free-flow exhaust system), capable of producing 140 bhp (105 kW) and 168 nm of torque. The body shell has been improved with double stitch welded monocoque chassis with front and rear strut tower brace bars. Body weight has been lightened as well.

==== Second generation ====
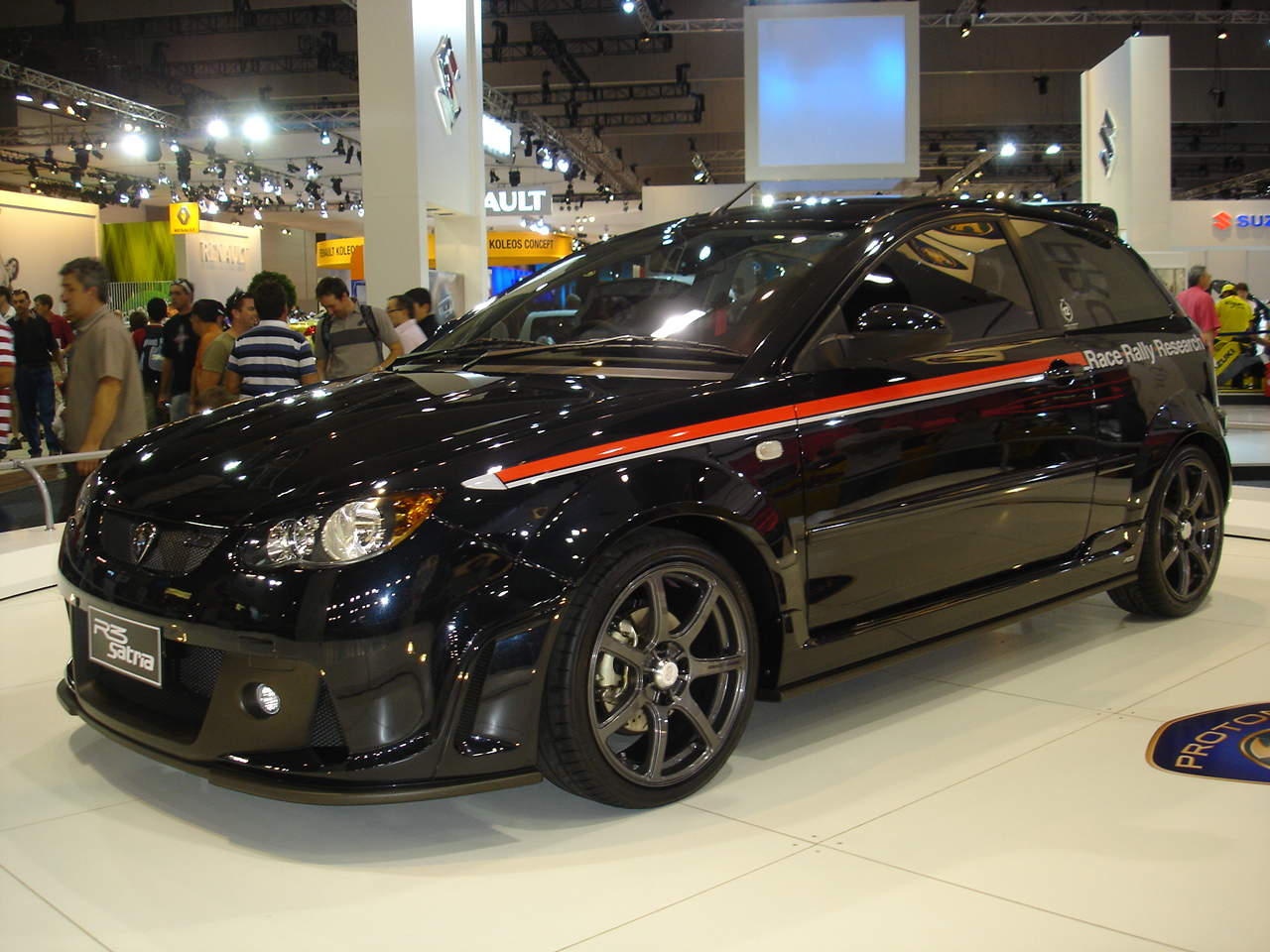
Proton Satria Neo R3 (second generation)

The Satria Neo R3 was unveiled in 2008, featuring a naturally aspired 1.6-litre engine producing 100 kW (136 PS; 134 hp) or 110 bhp (82 kW; 112 PS), which Proton says will deliver a "controlled yet exciting driving experience". Other upgrades include a sportier bodykit, 17-inch wheels, a lowered suspension setup derived from Lotus, an improved braking system, Recaro lightweight seats and a MOMO steering wheel.

=== Proton Saga R3 and Proton Iriz R3 ===
The Proton Saga R3 and Proton Iriz R3, launched in 2021, are limited editions of the original third generation Proton Saga and Proton Iriz models respectively. The special editions come in black paint scheme with yellow highlights, upgraded interior, a modified bodykit and feature the Proton R3 badging predominantly. All of the changes are purely cosmetic to celebrate Proton’s success in the motorsports division.

== IRC Results ==
Year	Car	Driver	1	2	3	4	5	6	7	8	9	10	11	12	WDC	Points	WMC	Points
2009	Proton Satria Neo S2000	(United Kingdom) Guy Wilks	MON	BRA	KEN	POR	BEL; Ret	RUS; 5	POR; 11	CZE; Ret	ESP; 22	ITA; 13	SCO		7th*	15*	5th	13
2009	Proton Satria Neo S2000	(France) Bryan Bouffier	MON	BRA	KEN	POR	BEL	RUS	POR	CZE; Ret	ESP	ITA	SCO		–	0	5th	13
2009	Proton Satria Neo S2000	(United Kingdom) Alister McRae	MON	BRA	KEN	POR	BEL	RUS	POR	CZE	ESP	ITA	SCO; 2		12th	13	5th	13
2010	Proton Satria Neo S2000	(Australia) Chris Atkinson	MON	BRA	ARG	CAN	ITA	BEL; Ret	AZO; DNS	MAD	CZE	ITA	SCO	CYP	–	0	–	0
2010	Proton Satria Neo S2000	(United Kingdom) Alister McRae	MON	BRA	ARG	CAN	ITA	BEL; Ret	AZO; DNS	MAD	CZE	ITA	SCO; Ret	CYP	–	0	–	0
2010	Proton Satria Neo S2000	(United Kingdom) Niall McShea	MON	BRA	ARG	CAN	ITA	BEL	AZO	MAD	CZE; Ret	ITA; DNS	SCO	CYP	–	0	–	0
2010	Proton Satria Neo S2000	(Republic of Ireland) Keith Cronin	MON	BRA	ARG	CAN	ITA	BEL	AZO	MAD	CZE; Ret	ITA	SCO; Ret	CYP	–	0	–	0
2010	Proton Satria Neo S2000	(France) Gilles Panizzi	MON	BRA	ARG	CAN	ITA	BEL	AZO	MAD	CZE	ITA; 22	SCO	CYP	–	0	–	0
2010	Proton Satria Neo S2000	(United Kingdom) Tom Cave	MON	BRA	ARG	CAN	ITA	BEL; Ret	AZO	MAD	CZE	ITA	SCO; Ret	CYP	–	0	–	0
2011	Proton Satria Neo S2000	(Australia) Chris Atkinson	MON; Ret	CAN	FRA	UKR	BEL	AZO	CZE	HUN	ITA; Ret	SCO	CYP		–	0	7th	41
2011	Proton Satria Neo S2000	(Sweden) Per-Gunnar Andersson	MON; Ret	CAN; 24	FRA	UKR; Ret	BEL; 19	AZO	CZE; 9	HUN; Ret	ITA	SCO; Ret	CYP		37th	2	7th	41
2011	Proton Satria Neo S2000	(Italy) Giandomenico Basso	MON	CAN; 11	FRA	UKR; Ret	BEL; Ret	AZO	CZE; 13	HUN; Ret	ITA; 10	SCO	CYP		31st**	5**	7th	41
2011	Proton Satria Neo S2000	(Ukraine) Oleksandr Saliuk	MON	CAN	FRA	UKR; Ret	BEL	AZO	CZE	HUN	ITA	SCO	CYP		–	0	7th	41
2011	Proton Satria Neo S2000	(United Kingdom) Alister McRae	MON	CAN	FRA	UKR	BEL	AZO	CZE	HUN	ITA	SCO; Ret	CYP		–	0	7th	41

*Including 10 points that Wilks scored with Škoda Fabia S2000 at Rally Scotland. **Including 2 points that Basso scored with Peugeot 207 S2000 at Rallye Monte Carlo.

=== SWRC results ===
Year	Car	No.	Driver	1	2	3	4	5	6	7	8	SWRC	Points
2012	Proton Satria Neo S2000	33	(Sweden) Per-Gunnar Andersson	MON; Ret	SWE; 1	POR	NZL; 2	FIN; 1	GBR; 6	FRA; 3	ESP; 2	2nd	91
2012	Proton Satria Neo S2000	34	(Italy) Giandomenico Basso	MON; Ret								NC	0
2012	Proton Satria Neo S2000	34	(United Kingdom) Alister McRae		SWE; 7		NZL; Ret					13th	6
2012	Proton Satria Neo S2000	34	(Finland) Juha Salo					FIN; 3				8th	15
2012	Proton Satria Neo S2000	34	(United Kingdom) Tom Cave						GBR; 2			7th	18
2012	Proton Satria Neo S2000	34	(Austria) Andreas Aigner							FRA; 4		11th	12
2012	Proton Satria Neo S2000	34	(United Kingdom) Alastair Fisher								ESP; 4	6th	22

=== APRC results ===
Year	Entrant	Driver	Car	1	2	3	4	5	6	7	APRC	Points
2009	Proton R3 Malaysia	(United Kingdom) Alister McRae	Proton Satria Neo S2000	NCL	AUS	NZL	JPN	MYS	IDN; Ret	CHN	-	0
2010	Proton R3 Malaysia	(United Kingdom) Alister McRae	Proton Satria Neo S2000	MAL; Ret	JPN; Ret	NZL; 2	AUS; Ret	NCL	IDN	CHN; 1	3rd	78
2010	Proton R3 Malaysia	(Australia) Chris Atkinson	Proton Satria Neo S2000	MAL; 4	JPN; Ret	NZL	AUS; Ret	NCL	IDN	CHN; 2	5th	48
2011	Proton Motorsport	(United Kingdom) Alister McRae	Proton Satria Neo S2000	MAL; 3	AUS; 4	NCL; 3	NZL; 5	JPN; 2	CHN; 1		1st	153
2011	Proton Motorsport	(Australia) Chris Atkinson	Proton Satria Neo S2000	MAL; 1	AUS; Ret	NCL; 1	NZL; 1	JPN; Ret	CHN; 2		2nd	139
2012	Proton Motorsport	(United Kingdom) Alister McRae	Proton Satria Neo S2000	NZL; 4	NCL; Ret	AUS; 2	MYS; 1	JPN; Ret	CHN; 1		2nd	120
2012	Proton Motorsport	(Sweden) Per-Gunnar Andersson	Proton Satria Neo S2000	NZL; 2	NCL; Ret	AUS; 4	MYS; Ret	JPN	CHN		7th	55
2012	Proton Motorsport	(Finland) Juha Salo	Proton Satria Neo S2000	NZL	NCL	AUS	MYS	JPN; Ret	CHN; 5		-	0
