= Tom Cave =

British rally driver

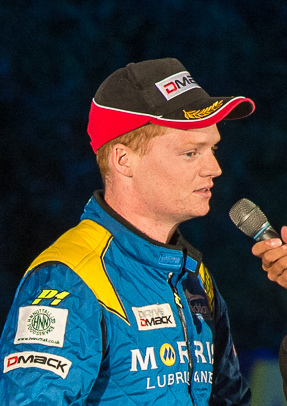
- Rally Germany 2014

Personal information
- Nationality: (United Kingdom) British
- Born: 16 November 1991 (age 35); Aberdyfi, Wales, UK

World Rally Championship record
- Years active: 2008–2010, 2012–2015, 2017–present
- Teams: Proton Motorsports, Adapta
- Rallies: 23
- Championships: 0
- Rally wins: 0
- Podiums: 0
- Stage wins: 0
- Total points: 0
- First rally: 2008 Rally GB
- Last rally: 2019 Wales Rally GB

Thomas Cave (born 16 November 1991) is a British rally driver. He is the son of club rally driver Peter Cave and his ambition is to become the next British champion in the FIA World Rally Championship. He is the UK's first minor international rally driver and achieved his international rally licence, issued in Latvia, at the age of 16.

== Career ==
=== Early ===
Cave first began driving at the age of eight, when he took to the wheel of a car on private ground. However, it was when he was 13 that his father bought him a motorcycle-engined, rear wheel-drive buggy and it was this that would push his development forward at a huge rate.

Cave continued his development at the Martin Rowe Ice Driving School in Norway. Under the tutelage of the former FIA Production car World Rally Champion, Tom's car control skills and the beginnings of the additional experience, such as pace notes, began to take shape.

At the beginning of 2007, Cave teamed-up with former WRC co-driver Gemma Price and the pair headed to Latvia, where drivers can compete in genuine rallies from the age of just 14 years.

Cave spent 2007 competing in the Latvian RallySprint Championship at the wheel of an MG ZR. In 2008, he stepped up to a Group N Ford Fiesta ST, the same specification as used in the various one-make series around the world, including as a support series for the WRC.

Cave contested the Latvian Rally Championship that year but as the focus of his year was on his GCSE exams, was forced to miss several events. However, he secured his international rally licence and went on to make his WRC debut on the UK round of the WRC, Wales Rally GB at the end of the year.

Following further guidance and mentoring from Rowe, Cave and Price eventually won their class on the event, N3, by 15 minutes. In the run-up to the event, Tom was exposed to a flurry of media interest, as the event began just 18 days after his 17th birthday and he needed a full UK driving licence to compete.

As Cave returned home from the driving test, there were live TV news crews from Sky News, BBC News and ITV waiting for him. He also carried out live radio interviews with Radio 1,2,3,4 and 5 Live as he tore up his 'L’ plates. This meant that he would be the youngest-ever driver to compete in the UK round of the WRC.

This fact led to Cave being invited onto Channel Five’s motoring program, Fifth Gear. He was challenged to go head to head with presenter Vicki Butler-Henderson in a Subaru Impreza WRX around a Rallycross circuit to see who was faster. Tom beat the presenter, who also removed the car's rear bumper on camera.

=== 2009 ===
Cave's program for 2009 was made up of selected events from the WRC, British Rally Championship and the Intercontinental Rally Challenge, since he was not able to contest a full championship in any, due to his age. As he was only 17, he was not permitted to drive legally in the majority of countries that formed the WRC and IRC.

However, Cave began his programme in Portugal on the WRC event, where engine failure on the first day when lying second in class cut his event short.

Cave then contested his first two asphalt events, beginning with the RDP Welsh International. He finished this fourth in class, a result he was pleased with considering it was his debut on the surface. He followed that up with sixth in class and third Fiesta on the famous Jim Clark Rally, a round of the British Rally Championship. He was chasing the first Fiesta spot during the event and looked to be taking the position before a small error cost him time and demoted him to third.

Cave's next event saw a return to the WRC and Rally Poland, debuting in the WRC. He dominated the N3 class, including the international Fiesta one-make series on the first day but a head gasket failure on the second day meant that he eventually finished the rally sixth in class, 16 minutes behind the winner but with 25 minutes of 'SupeRally' penalties.

Cave was then invited to take part in the Richard Burns Memorial Rally by Neil Cole, presenter of the WRC on digital TV channel Dave. The pair finished 14th overall and sixth in class, another outstanding result considering they faced kit cars and ex-works Vauxhall Astras in their Group N Fiesta.

=== 2010 ===
Cave's 2010 season began with an outing on the infamous Rallye Monte Carlo, using the Ford Fiesta ST he had been driving in 2009. He eventually finished the event 27th overall and 8th in the IRC 2WD Cup, gaining his first international driver's championship point.

Cave also secured his first outright rally win, at the wheel of his Subaru Impreza N10 on the Coracle Stages in July and drove the MML Sports Group N Mitsubishi Lancer N4 on Rally Latvia but was forced to stop and change a puncture when lying second in Group N.

Cave's first outing was on the Plains Rally in Wales where he finished second in N4 but in June, he took third overall on his tarmac debut, behind Patrik Snijers and Chris Atkinson. The following Ypres Rally didn't go so well, with all three Protons retiring on the same stage.

Cave contested several other events in the Proton and while setting impressive stage times, ultimately car failure would end each event.

=== 2011 ===
Cave began the year targeting the British Rally Championship with the JRM team running him in a Mitsubishi Lancer EvolutionX Group N car. He was second on the season opener, the Sunseeker Rally but an accident on the Bulldog followed by car failure on the Jim Clark meant that realistically, he was out of the running.

Cave's focus switched to the BTRDA Series, which he had also been competing in using his Subaru and by the midpoint of the season, was leading the Production Cup class of the series.

A crash in the Subaru meant the car was out of action for the rest of the season so Cave was forced to hire a series of cars to complete the BTRDA but this didn't affect his performances. He went on to clinch the Production Cup championship with one round to go, so entered the Cambrian Rally in an MML Sports Mitsubishi Lancer World Rally Car and finished the event second on his WRC debut.

=== 2012 ===
Cave once again targeted the BRC in 2012, having decided to run his own Citroen DS3 R3 car. However, this was delivered too late for the first round the Sunseeker, so he used a rented Ford Fiesta R2 on that occasion.

Cave then won the Bulldog Rally, the second round, outright using a rented Citroen after his car was damaged on a test following component failure.

Cave was on top or close to the top of the BRC points table all season and despite another win on the final round, the International Rally of Yorkshire, was not able to overhaul double-BRC winner, Keith Cronin. He became runner-up in 2012 but won the Citroen Racing Junior Cup.

Cave was also selected by the Proton Motorsports factory team to represent it on two events: he won the Thailand Rally for Proton and on Wales Rally GB, the UK round of the FIA World Rally Championship, finished second in the S-WRC category, behind Craig Breen and ahead of Proton team-mate, PG Andersson.

== Career results ==
=== Complete World Rally Championship results ===
Year	Entrant	Car	1	2	3	4	5	6	7	8	9	10	11	12	13	14	15	Pos.	Points
2008	Tom Cave	Ford Fiesta ST	MON	SWE	MEX	ARG	JOR	ITA	GRE	TUR	FIN	GER	NZL	ESP	FRA	JPN	GBR; 30	NC	0
2009	Tom Cave	Ford Fiesta ST	IRE	NOR	CYP	POR; Ret	ARG	ITA	GRE	POL; 31	FIN	AUS	ESP	GBR; 43				NC	0
2010	Tom Cave	Proton Satria Neo S2000	SWE	MEX	JOR	TUR	NZL	POR	BUL	FIN	GER	JPN	FRA	ESP	GBR; Ret			NC	0
2012	Proton Motorsports	Proton Satria Neo S2000	MON	SWE	MEX	POR	ARG	GRE	NZL	FIN	GER	GBR; 14	FRA	ITA	ESP			NC	0
2013	Semerád Rally Team	Ford Fiesta R5	MON	SWE	MEX	POR	ARG	GRE	ITA	FIN	GER	AUS	FRA	ESP	GBR; 12			NC	0
2014	Tom Cave	Ford Fiesta R2	MON	SWE	MEX	POR; 40	ARG	ITA	POL; 27	FIN; 37	GER; 30	AUS	FRA	ESP; 27				NC	0
2014	MZR Paraguay	Ford Fiesta R5													GBR; 15			NC	0
2015	Tom Cave	Ford Fiesta R2T	MON	SWE	MEX	ARG	POR; 37	ITA	POL; 32	FIN; 21	GER; Ret	AUS	FRA	ESP; 39				NC	0
2015	E2‐Tre Colli World Rally Team	Ford Fiesta R5													GBR; Ret			NC	0
2017	Adapta	Hyundai i20 R5	MON	SWE	MEX	FRA	ARG	POR	ITA	POL	FIN; 15	GER	ESP					NC	0
2017	Styllex Motorsports	Ford Fiesta R5												GBR; 13	AUS			NC	0
2018	Tom Cave	Hyundai i20 R5	MON	SWE	MEX	FRA	ARG	POR	ITA	FIN	GER	TUR	GBR; Ret	ESP	AUS			NC	0
2019	Tom Cave	Hyundai i20 R5	MON	SWE	MEX	FRA	ARG	CHL	POR	ITA	FIN	GER	TUR	GBR; 11	ESP	AUS; C		NC	0

^{*} Season still in progress

=== SWRC results ===
Year	Entrant	Car	1	2	3	4	5	6	7	8	Pos.	Points
2012	Proton Motorsports	Proton Satria Neo S2000	MON	SWE	POR	NZL	FIN	GBR; 2	FRA	ESP	7th	18

=== WRC-2 results ===
Year	Entrant	Car	1	2	3	4	5	6	7	8	9	10	11	12	13	Pos.	Points
2013	Semerád Rally Team	Ford Fiesta R5	MON	SWE	MEX	POR	ARG	GRE	ITA	FIN	GER	AUS	FRA	ESP	GBR; 5	30th	10
2014	MZR Paraguay	Ford Fiesta R5	MON	SWE	MEX	POR	ARG	ITA	POL	FIN	GER	AUS	FRA	ESP	GBR; 4	26th	12
2015	E2‐Tre Colli World Rally Team	Ford Fiesta R5	MON	SWE	MEX	ARG	POR	ITA	POL	FIN	GER	AUS	FRA	ESP	GBR; Ret	NC	10
2017	Adapta	Hyundai i20 R5	MON	SWE	MEX	FRA	ARG	POR	ITA	POL	FIN; 3	GER	ESP			12th	30
2017	Styllex Motorsports	Ford Fiesta R5												GBR; 3	AUS	12th	30

=== Drive DMACK Cup results ===
Year	Entrant	Car	1	2	3	4	5	Pos.	Points
2014	Tom Cave	Ford Fiesta R2	POR; 2	POL; 2	FIN; 7	GER; 1	ESP; 2	2nd	101
2015	Tom Cave	Ford Fiesta R2T	POR; 5	POL; 2	FIN; 1	GER; Ret	ESP; 3	2nd	115

=== IRC results ===
Year	Entrant	Car	1	2	3	4	5	6	7	8	9	10	11	12	Pos.	Points
2010	(United Kingdom) Tom Cave	Ford Fiesta ST	MON; 28	BRA	ARG	CAN	ITA								NC	0
2010	(Malaysia) Proton Motorsport	Proton Satria Neo S2000						BEL; Ret	AZO; WD	MAD	CZE	ITA	SCO; Ret	CYP	NC	0

=== ERC results ===
Year	Entrant	Car	1	2	3	4	5	6	7	8	9	10	Pos.	Points
2016	(United Kingdom) Spencer Sport	Ford Fiesta R5	CAN	IRE; 8	GRE	AZO	YPR	EST	POL	ZLI	LIE	CYP	56th	4
