= Rally Italia Sardegna =

Motorsport competition in Sardinia, Italy

- Status: Active
- Genre: Motorsporting event
- Frequency: Annual
- Location: Sardinia
- Country: Italy
- Inaugurated: 2004
- Website: rallyitaliasardegna.com

The Rally Italia Sardegna (formerly known as Rally d'Italia Sardegna) is a rally competition held on island of Sardinia in Italy. The rally is one of the World Rally Championship (WRC) rounds from 2004 to 2026, except for one year in 2010 being held as an Intercontinental Rally Challenge (IRC) event. The rally is set to be hosted as a European Rally Championship (ERC) event from 2027 onwards.

== Characteristics ==
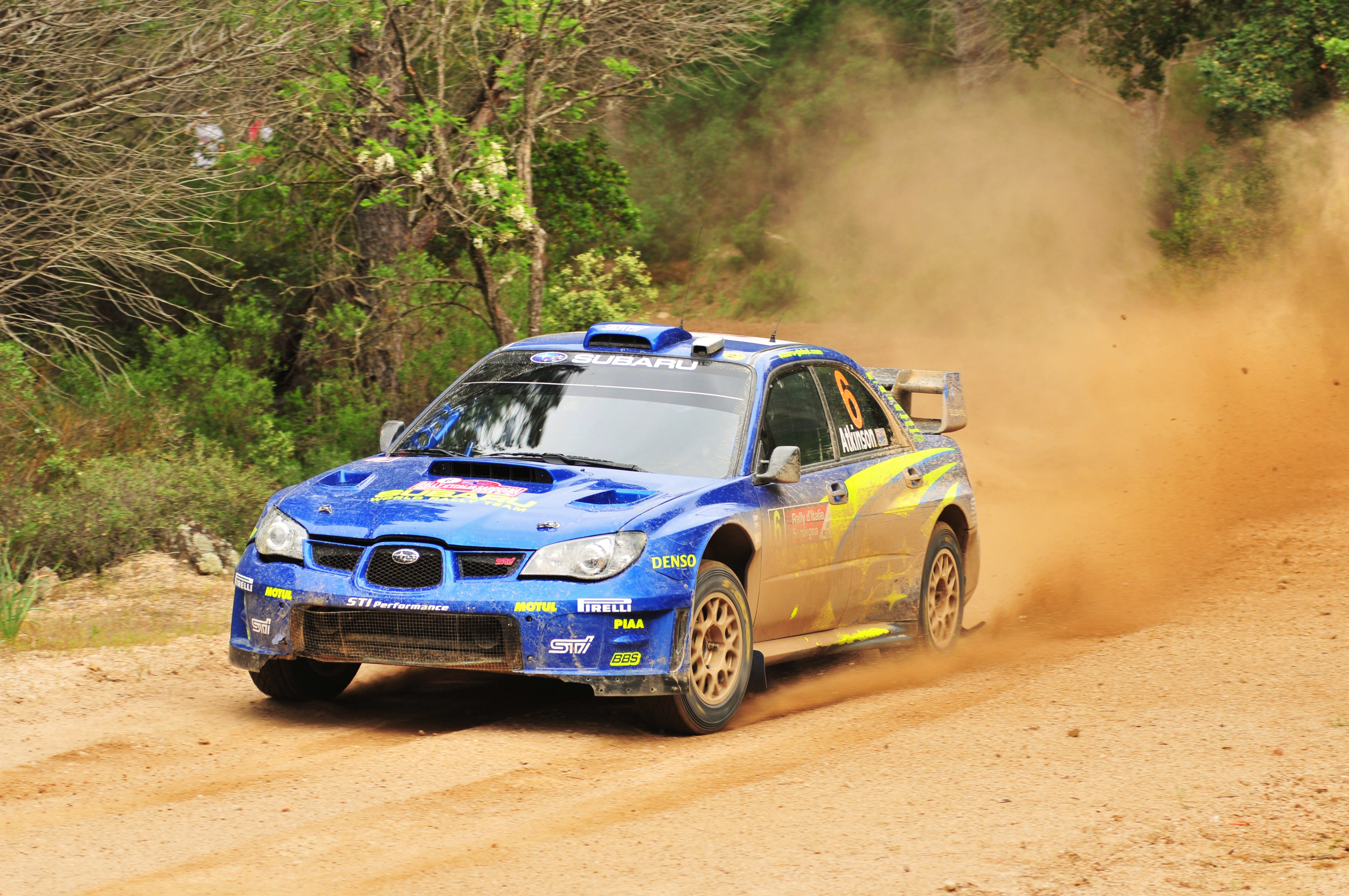
Chris Atkinson driving a Subaru Impreza WRC at the 2008 rally.

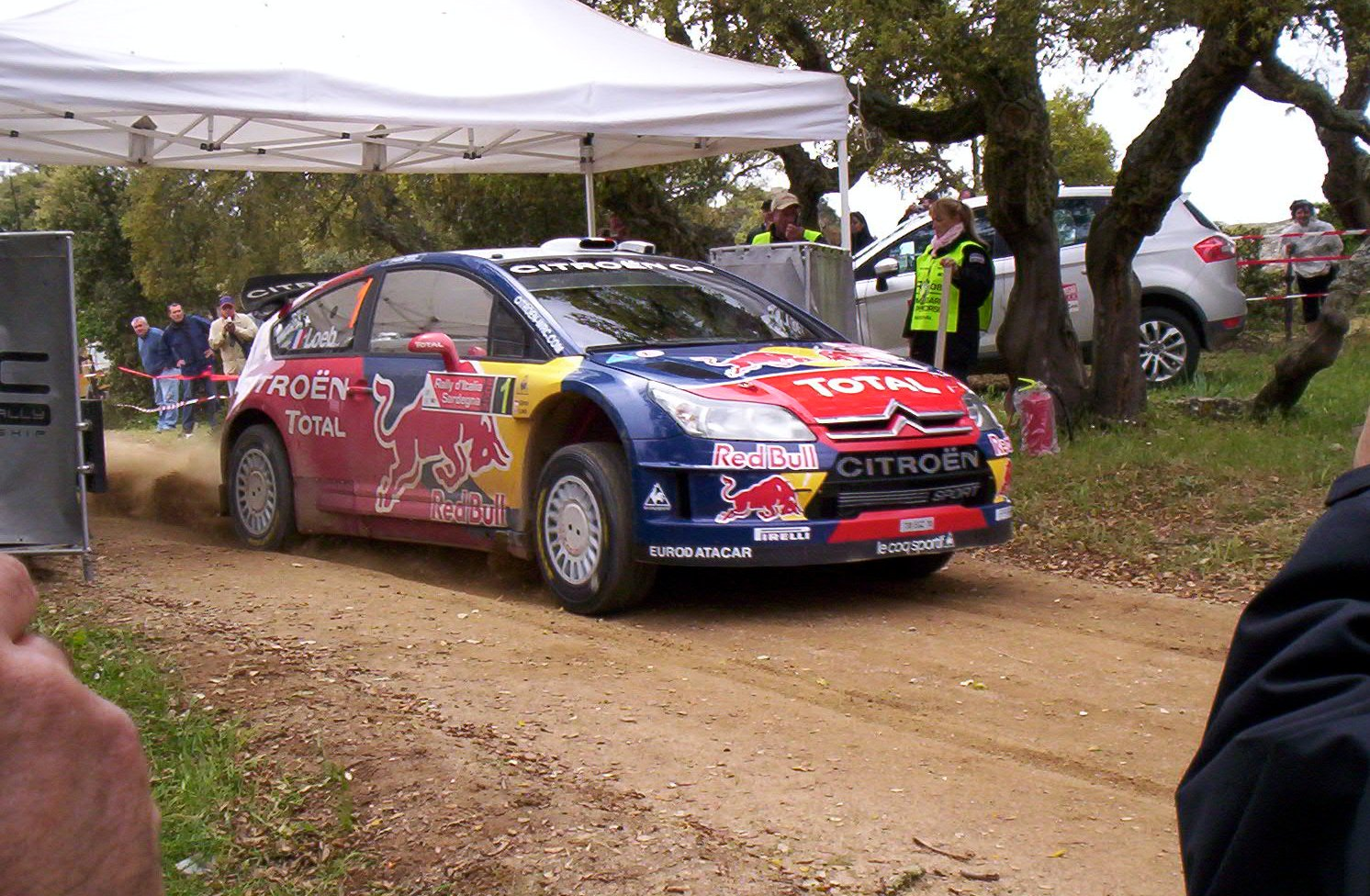
Four-time winner Sébastien Loeb at the start of a stage.

The rally is held on narrow, twisty, sandy and bumpy mountain roads around the town of Alghero or Olbia. The Italian round of the World Rally Championship was previously the Rallye Sanremo, held first as a mixed surface event and later on asphalt roads around the resort of Sanremo, but Rally d'Italia Sardegna replaced it in the WRC schedule from the 2004 season.

The 2008 event was held from 15 to 18 May 2008 and the latest stage, Liscia Ruja (2.69 km, near the five-star hotel in Cala di Volpe, well known as James Bond's favourite resort), was broadcast live. The 2010 rally was the first running of the event under IRC rules and four stages were also broadcast live by Eurosport.

== Winners ==
Season	Driver	Co-driver	Team	Car	Tyre	Category	Report	Ref
2004	(Norway) Petter Solberg	(United Kingdom) Phil Mills	(Japan) 555 Subaru World Rally Team	Subaru Impreza WRC	P	WRC	Report	
2005	(France) Sébastien Loeb	(Monaco) Daniel Elena	(France) Citroën Total World Rally Team	Citroën Xsara WRC	M	WRC	Report	
2006	(France) Sébastien Loeb	(Monaco) Daniel Elena	(Belgium) Kronos Citroën World Rally Team	Citroën Xsara WRC	BF	WRC	Report	
2007	(Finland) Marcus Grönholm	(Finland) Timo Rautiainen	(United Kingdom) BP Ford World Rally Team	Ford Focus RS WRC	BF	WRC	Report	
2008	(France) Sébastien Loeb	(Monaco) Daniel Elena	(France) Citroën Total World Rally Team	Citroën C4 WRC	P	WRC	Report	
2009	(Finland) Jari-Matti Latvala	(Finland) Miikka Anttila	(United Kingdom) BP Ford Abu Dhabi World Rally Team	Ford Focus RS WRC	P	WRC	Report	
2010	(Finland) Juho Hänninen	(Finland) Mikko Markkula	(Czech Republic) Škoda Motorsport	Škoda Fabia S2000	BF	IRC	Report	
2011	(France) Sébastien Loeb	(Monaco) Daniel Elena	(France) Citroën Total World Rally Team	Citroën DS3 WRC	M	WRC	Report	
2012	(Finland) Mikko Hirvonen	(Finland) Jarmo Lehtinen	(France) Citroën Total World Rally Team	Citroën DS3 WRC	M	WRC	Report	
2013	(France) Sébastien Ogier	(France) Julien Ingrassia	(Germany) Volkswagen Motorsport	Volkswagen Polo R WRC	M	WRC	Report	
2014	(France) Sébastien Ogier	(France) Julien Ingrassia	(Germany) Volkswagen Motorsport	Volkswagen Polo R WRC	M	WRC	Report	
2015	(France) Sébastien Ogier	(France) Julien Ingrassia	(Germany) Volkswagen Motorsport	Volkswagen Polo R WRC	M	WRC	Report	
2016	(Belgium) Thierry Neuville	(Belgium) Nicolas Gilsoul	(South Korea) Hyundai Motorsport N	Hyundai i20 WRC	M	WRC	Report	
2017	(Estonia) Ott Tänak	(Estonia) Martin Järveoja	(United Kingdom) M-Sport World Rally Team	Ford Fiesta WRC	M	WRC	Report	
2018	(Belgium) Thierry Neuville	(Belgium) Nicolas Gilsoul	(South Korea) Hyundai Shell Mobis WRT	Hyundai i20 Coupe WRC	M	WRC	Report	
2019	(Spain) Dani Sordo	(Spain) Carlos del Barrio	(South Korea) Hyundai Shell Mobis WRT	Hyundai i20 Coupe WRC	M	WRC	Report	
2020	(Spain) Dani Sordo	(Spain) Carlos del Barrio	(South Korea) Hyundai Shell Mobis WRT	Hyundai i20 Coupe WRC	M	WRC	Report	
2021	(France) Sébastien Ogier	(France) Julien Ingrassia	(Japan) Toyota Gazoo Racing WRT	Toyota Yaris WRC	P	WRC	Report	
2022	(Estonia) Ott Tänak	(Estonia) Martin Järveoja	(South Korea) Hyundai Shell Mobis WRT	Hyundai i20 N Rally1	P	WRC	Report	
2023	(Belgium) Thierry Neuville	(Belgium) Martijn Wydaeghe	(South Korea) Hyundai Shell Mobis WRT	Hyundai i20 N Rally1	P	WRC	Report	
2024	(Estonia) Ott Tänak	(Estonia) Martin Järveoja	(South Korea) Hyundai Shell Mobis WRT	Hyundai i20 N Rally1	P	WRC	Report	
2025	(France) Sébastien Ogier	(France) Vincent Landais	(Japan) Toyota Gazoo Racing WRT	Toyota GR Yaris Rally1	H	WRC	Report	
2026	(Sweden) Oliver Solberg	(United Kingdom) Elliott Edmondson	(Japan) Toyota Gazoo Racing WRT	Toyota GR Yaris Rally1	H	WRC	Report	
