= Giandomenico Basso =

Italian rally driver (born 1973)

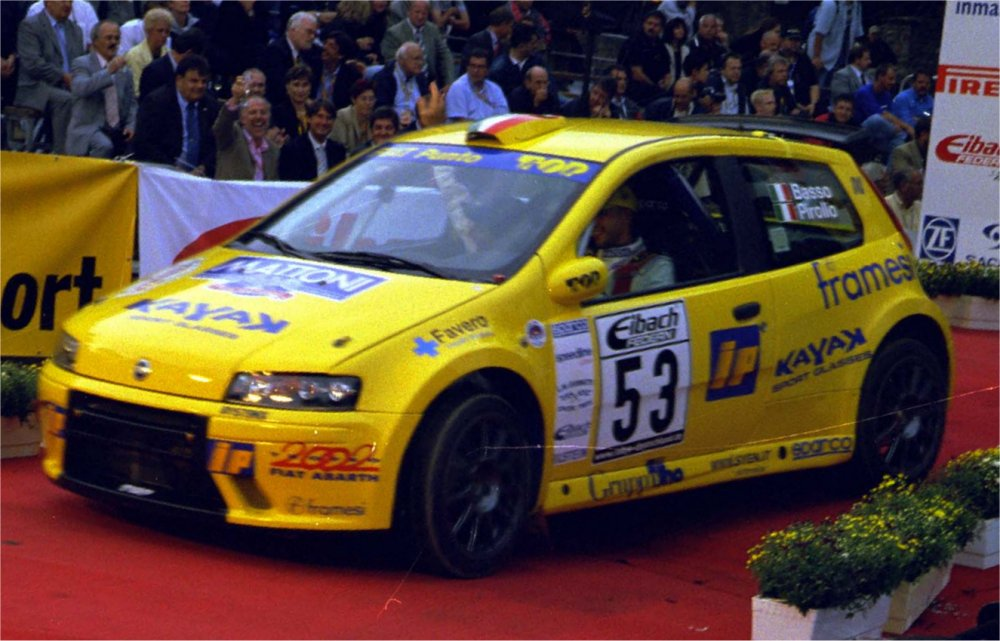
- Basso at the 2002 Rallye Deutschland

Personal information
- Nationality: (Italy) Italian
- Born: 15 September 1973 (age 53)

World Rally Championship record
- Years active: 1998-1999, 2001-2002, 2006, 2012, 2017, 2019
- Co-driver: (Italy) Flavio Guglielmini (Italy) Luigi Pirollo (Italy) Mitia Dotta (Italy) Simone Scattolin (Italy) Lorenzo Granai
- Teams: Fiat / Abarth, Proton
- Rallies: 19
- Championships: 0
- Rally wins: 0
- Podiums: 0
- Stage wins: 0
- Total points: 0
- First rally: 1998 Rallye Sanremo

Giandomenico Basso (born 15 September 1973, in Montebelluna) is an Italian rally driver and a five time Italian Rally Champion.

== Rally career ==
After competing in karting from 1981, Basso has been rallying since 1994. Basso has driven Fiats throughout his rallying career. He made his World Rally Championship debut on Rallye Sanremo in 1998, in a Fiat Seicento. In 2001 and 2002, he competed on WRC rounds in the Junior World Rally Championship in a Fiat Punto S1600, finishing fifth in 2001 and fourth in 2002. In 2006, Basso won the inaugural Intercontinental Rally Challenge and the European Rally Championship in a Fiat Grande Punto S2000 for Abarth. In 2007, he won the Italian Rally Championship. In 2009, he won again the European Rally Championship, driving an Abarth Grande Punto S2000.

Basso used to be co-driven by Flavio Guglielmini, who died in a crash on the European Championship round Rally Bulgaria in July 2009 as co-driver to Swiss driver Brian Lavio. Basso has also been co-driven by Luigi Pirollo and currently by Mitia Dotta.

=== WRC results ===
Year	Entrant	Car	1	2	3	4	5	6	7	8	9	10	11	12	13	14	15	16	Pos.	Pts
1998	Giandomenico Basso	Fiat Seicento Sporting	MON	SWE	KEN	POR	ESP	FRA	ARG	GRE	NZL	FIN	ITA; Ret	AUS	GBR				NC	0
1999	Giandomenico Basso	Fiat Cinquecento Sporting	MON; 23	SWE	KEN	POR	ESP	FRA	ARG	GRE	NZL	FIN	CHN	ITA	AUS	GBR			NC	0
2001	Top Run	Fiat Punto S1600	MON	SWE	POR	ESP; 16	ARG	CYP	GRE; Ret	KEN	FIN; Ret	NZL	ITA; Ret	FRA; 15	AUS; Ret				NC	0
2002	Giandomenico Basso	Fiat Punto S1600	MON; Ret	SWE	FRA	ESP; 21	CYP	ARG	GRE; Ret	KEN	FIN	GER; 21	ITA; 16	NZL	AUS	GBR; 24			NC	0
2006	Giandomenico Basso	Fiat Abarth Grande Punto S2000	MON	SWE	MEX	ESP	FRA	ARG	ITA	GRE	GER	FIN	JPN	CYP	TUR; 35	AUS	NZL	GBR	NC	0
2012	Proton Motorsport	Proton Satria Neo S2000	MON; Ret	SWE	MEX	POR	ARG	GRE	NZL	FIN	GER	GBR	FRA	ITA	ESP				NC	0
2017	BRC Racing Team	Ford Fiesta R5	MON; Ret	SWE	MEX	FRA	ARG	POR	ITA	POL	FIN	GER	ESP	GBR	AUS				NC	0
2019	LORAN s.r.l	Škoda Fabia R5	MON	SWE	MEX	FRA	ARG	CHL	POR	ITA; 17	FIN	GER	TUR	GBR	ESP	AUS; C			NC	0

==== JWRC Results ====
Year	Entrant	Car	1	2	3	4	5	6	JWRC	Points
2001	Top Run	Fiat Punto S1600	ESP; 2	GRE; Ret	FIN; Ret	ITA; Ret	FRA; 3	GBR; Ret	5th	10
2002	Giandomenico Basso	Fiat Punto S1600	MON; Ret	ESP; 3	GRE; Ret	GER; 7	ITA; 2	GBR; 3	4th	14

==== SWRC results ====
Year	Entrant	Car	1	2	3	4	5	6	7	8	SWRC	Points
2012	Proton Motorsport	Proton Satria Neo S2000	MON; Ret	SWE	POR	NZL	FIN	GBR	FRA	ESP	NC	0

==== WRC-2 results ====
Year	Entrant	Car	1	2	3	4	5	6	7	8	9	10	11	12	13	Pos.	Points
2017	BRC Racing Team	Ford Fiesta R5	MON; Ret	SWE	MEX	FRA	ARG	POR	ITA	POL	FIN	GER	ESP	GBR	AUS	NC	0

=== IRC results ===
Year	Entrant	Car	1	2	3	4	5	6	7	8	9	10	11	12	WDC	Points
2006	(Italy) Giandomenico Basso	Fiat Grande Punto Abarth S2000	RSA	YPR; 1	MAD; 1	ITA									1st	20
2007	(Italy) Abarth & Co. SpA	Fiat Grande Punto Abarth S2000	KEN	TUR	BEL	RUS	POR; 1	CZE	ITA; 2	SWI	CHI				5th	18
2008	(Italy) Abarth & Co. SpA	Fiat Grande Punto Abarth S2000	TUR; Ret	POR; 4	BEL; 6	RUS; 3	POR; 2	CZE; Ret	ESP; 1	ITA; 1	SWI; 5	CHI			3rd	46
2009	(Italy) Abarth & Co. SpA	Fiat Grande Punto Abarth S2000	MON; 5	BRA; 3	KEN	POR; Ret	BEL; 8	RUS; 3	POR; 1	CZE; Ret	ESP; 8	ITA	SCO		5th	28
2010	(Italy) Abarth & Co. SpA	Fiat Grande Punto Abarth S2000	MON	BRA	ARG	CAN	ITA	BEL	AZO	MAD	CZE	ITA; 7	SCO	CYP	36th	2
2011	(Italy) Giandomenico Basso	Peugeot 207 S2000	MON; 9												27th	5
2011	(Malaysia) Proton Motorsport	Proton Satria Neo S2000		CAN; 9	COR	YAL; Ret	YPR; Ret	AZO	ZLI; 13	MEC; Ret	SAN; 10	SCO	CYP		27th	5

Sporting positions
Preceded by None	Intercontinental Rally Challenge Champion; 2006	Succeeded by Enrique García-Ojeda
Preceded by Renato Travaglia	European Rally Champion; 2006	Succeeded by Simon Jean-Joseph
Preceded by Paolo Andreucci	Italian Rally Champion; 2007	Succeeded by Luca Rossetti
Preceded by Luca Rossetti	European Rally Champion; 2009	Succeeded by Luca Rossetti
Preceded by Paolo Andreucci	Italian Rally Champion; 2016	Succeeded by Incumbent
