= Freddy Loix =

Belgian rally driver (born 1970)

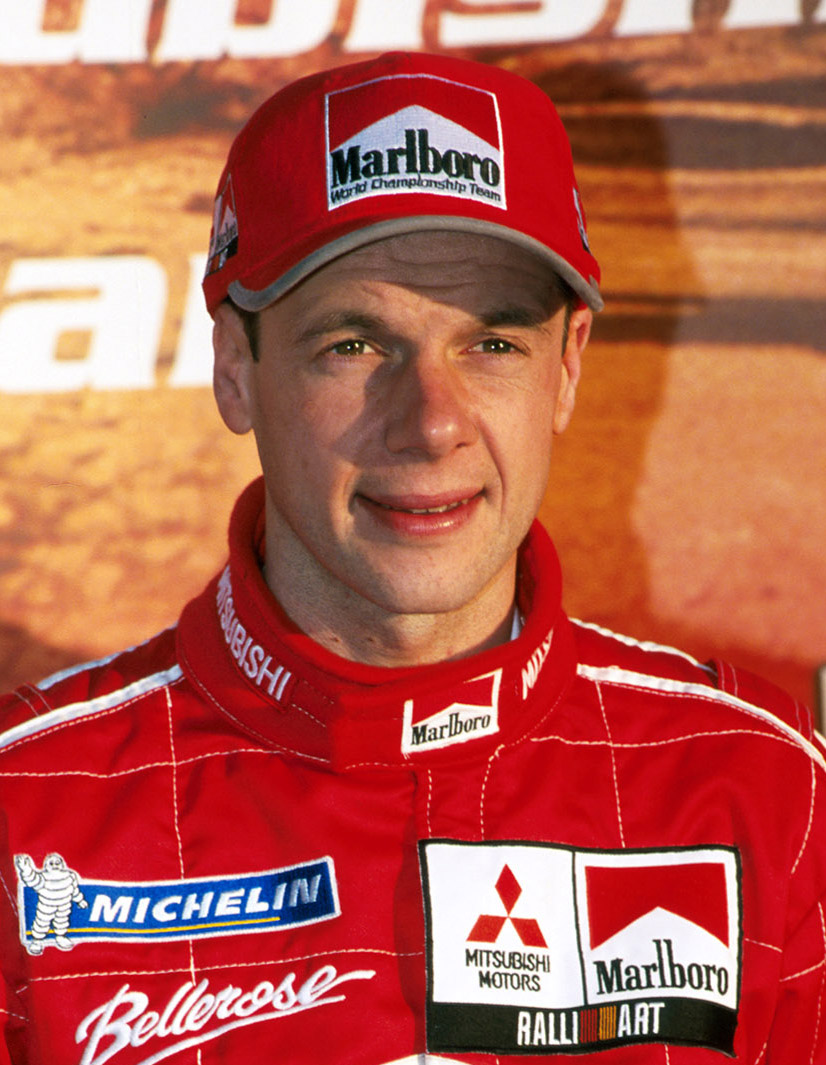

Personal information
- Nationality: (Belgium) Belgian
- Born: 10 November 1970 (age 56); Tongeren, Belgium

World Rally Championship record
- Years active: 1993–2004, 2022
- Co-driver: (Belgium) Johnny Vranken (Belgium) André Malais (Belgium) Sven Smeets (Belgium) Pieter Tsjoen
- Teams: Toyota, Mitsubishi, Hyundai, Peugeot
- Rallies: 93
- Championships: 0
- Rally wins: 0
- Podiums: 3
- Stage wins: 34
- Total points: 88
- First rally: 1993 Rallye Sanremo
- Last rally: 2022 Ypres Rally

Freddy Loix (born 10 November 1970) is a Belgian rally driver.

== Career ==
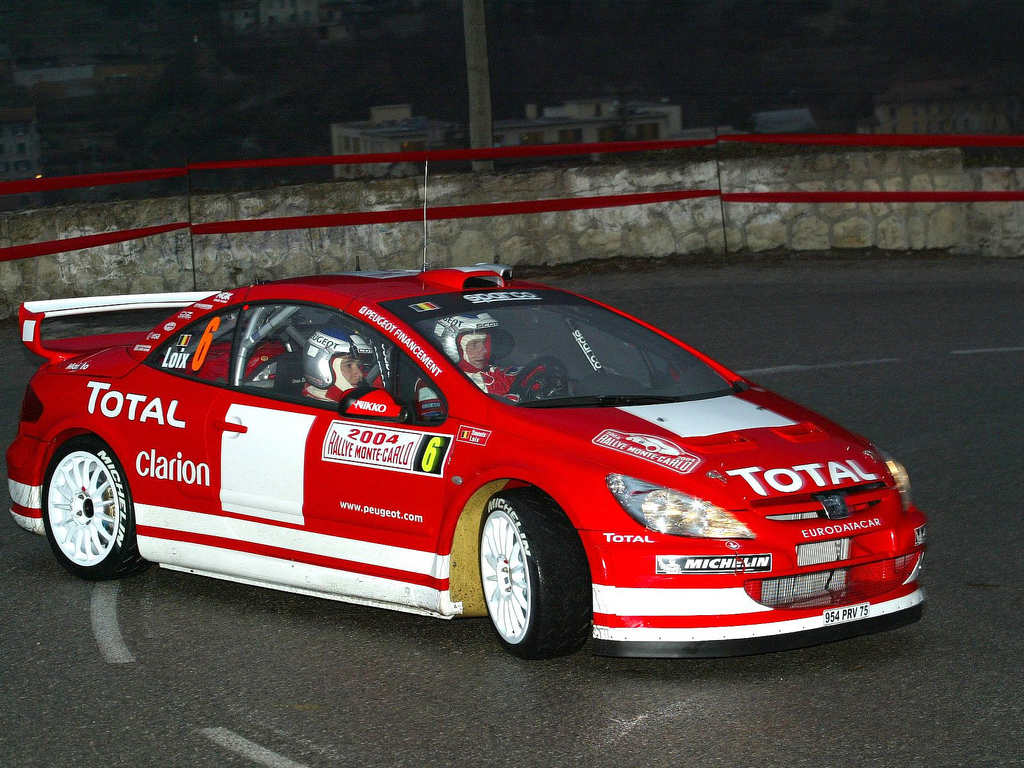
Loix driving a Peugeot 307 WRC.

Loix's career in motor sport began in karting at the age of 15. In 1990, he bought his first rally car, a Lancia Delta group N, though he soon progressed to a Mitsubishi Galant Group N.

1993 saw a big step forward in Loix's career as he became part of the Marlboro World Championship Team driving an Opel Astra and he became the Belgian F2-champion.

Nicknamed Fast Freddy by his fans, Loix made the switch to four wheel drive in 1996 with a Toyota Celica GT-Four and completed three World Rally Championship (WRC) events and a further six in 1997. This period saw continuing sponsorship with Marlboro and a switch to the new Toyota Corolla WRC. He took the lead in the 1997 Sanremo Rally but mechanical problems brought an end to his charge for victory.

Loix and his co-driver, Sven Smeets, moved to Mitsubishi in 1999 and campaigned a Mitsubishi Lancer Evolution VI (which was badged as a Carisma GT). His first year with Mitsubishi proved to be a difficult one with Loix being injured in a horrific accident during the Safari Rally. Despite the setback, Loix fought back and achieved four fourth places (in Spain, Greece, Sanremo and Australia).

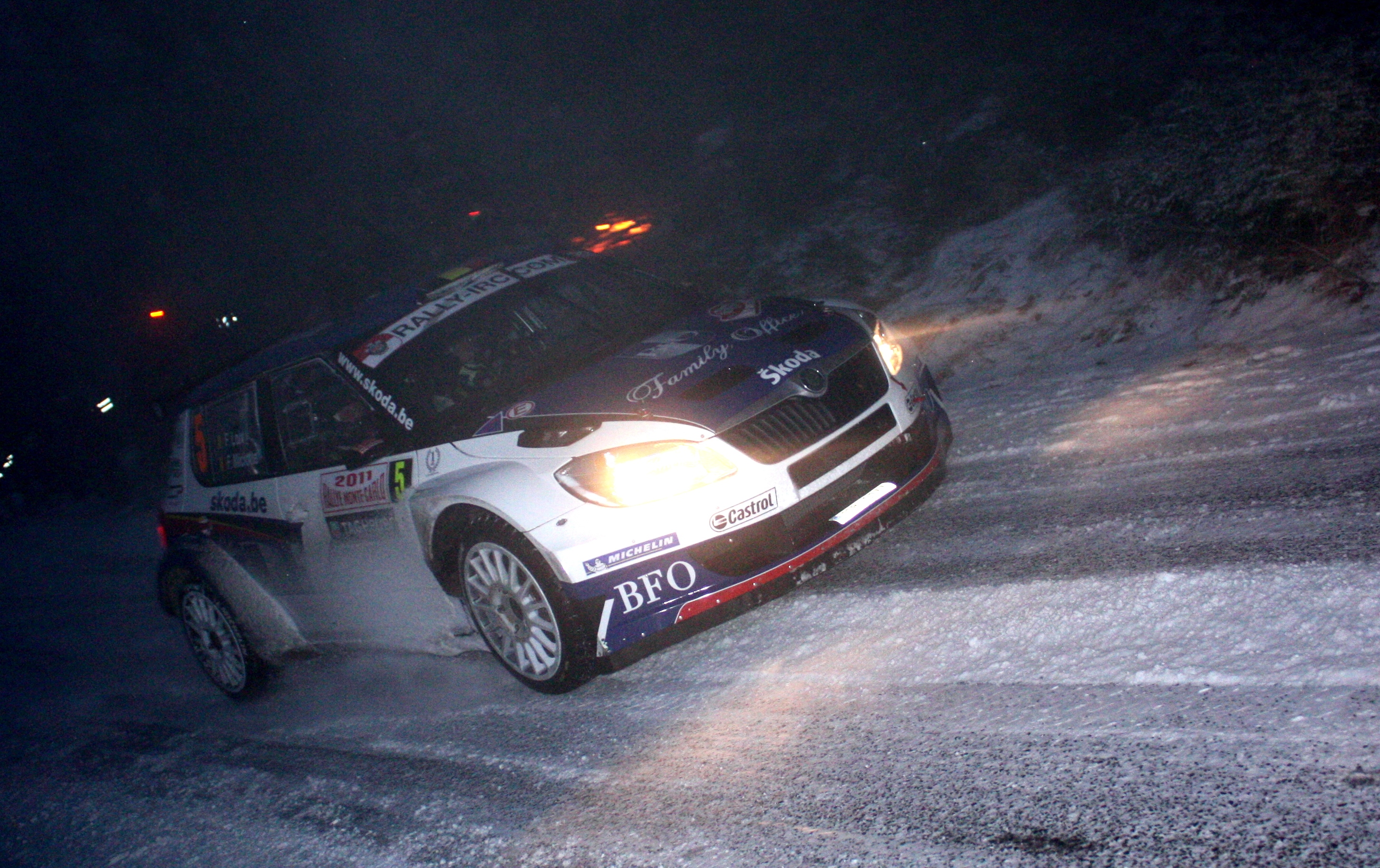
Loix at 2011 Rallye Monte Carlo with Škoda Fabia S2000.

In 2001, and after several successful seasons, the Mitsubishi Lancer, being a Group A car, found itself outdated and incapable of competing on the same level as the new WRC cars that the other teams were running.

Loix signed a two-year contract with Hyundai at the start of 2002. This was a difficult season in the Hyundai Accent WRC and his best result was sixth place on the Rally Australia. Due to funding cutbacks in 2003, the team couldn't develop the car further and Hyundai retired from the WRC following 2003's Rally Australia.

A drive for Peugeot in the last rally of the 2003 calendar, the RAC Rally in Great Britain, not only saw him replace the by then ailing 2001 World Rally Champion Richard Burns, it also saw him finish in sixth place overall in that year's rally. In the 2004 season, Loix completed only 5 WRC events, all for the factory Peugeot team again, in a Peugeot 307 WRC before retiring from the WRC later that season after the 2004 Rally Catalunya. Since 2007, Loix has been competing in the FIA Intercontinental Rally Challenge (IRC) with Peugeot Sport Belgium, driving a Peugeot 207 S2000. Loix is currently the most successful driver in IRC with a total of seven wins, including a hat trick in 2010.

Loix has also competed on the Dakar rally. On the 2006 Dakar Rally for Bowler Motors and in 2007 driving a buggy.

Following motorsport, Loix invested into, and ran, the Aston Martin Brussels car dealership.

== Results ==
=== WRC results ===
Year	Entrant	Car	1	2	3	4	5	6	7	8	9	10	11	12	13	14	15	16	WDC	Points
1993	Opel Team Belgium	Opel Astra	MON	SWE	POR	KEN	FRA	GRC	ARG	NZL	FIN	AUS	ITA; 9	ESP	GBR				55th	2
1994	Opel Team Belgium	Opel Astra	MON	POR	KEN	FRA	GRC	ARG	NZL	FIN; 21	ITA; 24	GBR							–	0
1995	Opel Team Belgium	Opel Astra	MON	SWE	POR; Ret	FRA; 14	NZL	AUS	ESP	GBR									–	0
1996	Toyota Castrol Team	Toyota Celica GT-Four ST205	SWE	KEN	IDN	GRE; 7	ARG	FIN	AUS	ITA; 4	ESP; 4								8th	24
1997	Toyota Castrol Team	Toyota Celica GT-Four ST205	MON; 16	SWE	KEN	POR; 2	ESP	FRA	ARG	GRE; Ret	NZL	FIN; 37	IDN		AUS; 7	GBR			9th	8
1997	Toyota Castrol Team	Toyota Corolla WRC												ITA; 5					9th	8
1998	Toyota Castrol Team	Toyota Corolla WRC	MON	SWE	KEN	POR; 3	ESP; 2	FRA	ARG	GRC; 5	NZL	FIN	ITA	AUS; 6	GBR				8th	13
1999	Marlboro Mitsubishi Ralliart	Mitsubishi Lancer Evo VI	MON; Ret	SWE; 9	KEN; Ret	POR	ESP; 4	FRA; 8	ARG; Ret	GRE; 4	NZL; 8	FIN; 10	CHN; Ret	ITA; 4	AUS; 4	GBR; 5			8th	14
2000	Marlboro Mitsubishi Ralliart	Mitsubishi Lancer Evo VI	MON; 6	SWE; 8	KEN; Ret	POR; 6	ESP; 8	ARG; 5	GRE; Ret	NZL; Ret	FIN; Ret	CYP; 8	FRA; Ret	ITA; 8	AUS; Ret	GBR; Ret			15th	4
2001	Marlboro Mitsubishi Ralliart	Mitsubishi Lancer Evo 6.5	MON; 6	SWE; 13	POR; Ret	ESP; 4	ARG; 6	CYP; 5	GRC; 9	KEN; 5	FIN; 10	NZL; 11	ITA; 12	FRA; 12	AUS; 11	GBR; Ret			13th	9
2002	Hyundai Castrol WRT	Hyundai Accent WRC	MON; Ret	SWE; Ret	FRA; 9	ESP; 10	CYP; Ret	ARG; Ret	GRC; Ret	KEN; Ret	FIN; 9	GER; Ret	ITA; 28	NZL; 6	AUS; Ret	GBR; 8			19th	1
2003	Hyundai Castrol WRT	Hyundai Accent WRC	MON; Ret	SWE; 10	TUR; 10	NZL; Ret	ARG; Ret	GRE; Ret	CYP; Ret	GER; 11	FIN; 10	AUS; 8	ITA	FRA	ESP				14th	4
2003	Marlboro Peugeot Total	Peugeot 206 WRC														GBR; 6			14th	4
2004	Marlboro Peugeot Total	Peugeot 307 WRC	MON; 5	SWE; Ret	MEX	NZL	CYP	GRC	TUR	ARG	FIN	GER; 6	JPN	GBR	ITA	FRA; 7	ESP; Ret	AUS	10th	9
2022	Freddy Loix	Škoda Fabia Rally2 evo	MON; 24	SWE	CRO	POR	ITA; 17	KEN	EST	FIN; 20	BEL; 17	GRE	NZL	ESP	JPN				NC	0

=== IRC results ===
Year	Entrant	Car	1	2	3	4	5	6	7	8	9	10	11	12	13	WDC	Points
2006	(Belgium) Duindisteel	Citroen C2 S1600	RSA	YPR; 4	MAD	ITA										13th	5
2007	(Belgium) Belgian VW club	VW Polo S2000	SAF	TUR	YPR; Ret											16th	5
2007	Freddy Loix	Fiat Abarth Grande Punto S2000				RUS	MAD; Ret	ZLI; Ret	SAN; 11	VAL; 4	CHN					16th	5
2008	Peugeot Team Benelux	Peugeot 207 S2000	IST; 8	POR; Ret	YPR; 1	RUS; 4	MAD; 6	ZLI; 1	AST; 3	SAN; 5	VAL; 1	CHN				2nd	48
2009	Peugeot Team Benelux	Peugeot 207 S2000	MON; 2	CUR; 4	SAF	AZO; 4	YPR; 3	RUS	MAD; 6	ZLI; Ret	AST; 6	ITA; 4	SCO			3rd	37
2010	Škoda Motorsport	Škoda Fabia S2000	MON	CUR	ARG	CAN	SAR	YPR; 1	AZO	MAD; 1	ZLI; 1	SAN; 3	SCO	CYP		4th	36
2011	Škoda Motorsport	Škoda Fabia S2000	MON; 2	CAN; 4	COR; 3	YAL	YPR; 1	AZO	ZLI; 2	MEC; 3	SAN; Ret	SCO	CYP; 5			4th	123
2012	Duindisteel	Peugeot 207 S2000	AZO	CAN	IRL	COR	ITA	YPR; 2	SMR	ROM	ZLI	YAL	SLI	SAN	CYP	20th	18

=== ERC results ===
Year	Entrant	Car	1	2	3	4	5	6	7	8	9	10	11	12	WDC	Points
2013	Škoda Motorsport	Škoda Fabia S2000	JÄN	LIE	CAN	AZO	COR	YPR; 1	ROM	CZE	POL	CRO	SAN	VAL	11th	37
