= 2010 Intercontinental Rally Challenge =

Seasons
- ← 2009 2011 →

The 2010 Intercontinental Rally Challenge was the fifth season of the Intercontinental Rally Challenge. The season consisted of twelve rounds and started on 19 January with the Monte Carlo Rally. The season ended on November 6, at the Cyprus Rally.

Juho Hänninen became the drivers' champion after winning Rally Scotland, the third of his rally wins during the season. Hänninen also won in Argentina and Sardinia as he finished on the podium in ten of the eleven events that he contested during the season, of which three wins and four second places counted towards the championship's best seven scores rule. Škoda Motorsport team-mate Jan Kopecký finished in second place, some 18 points behind Hänninen. Although not as consistent as his team-mate, Kopecký won one event during the season, winning in the Canary Islands.

Third place was claimed by the top Peugeot driver and reigning champion Kris Meeke, after a third place in Scotland took him ahead of Freddy Loix. Meeke's season was blighted by errors of which retiring from five of the eleven events he contested but did take a win in Brazil. Despite taking part in four rallies, Loix's tarmac expertise shone through, winning the events in Ypres, Belgium, Madeira and the Czech Republic as well as a third place in Sanremo. Four other drivers took victories during the season; World Rally Championship front-runner Mikko Hirvonen won a one-off outing in Monte Carlo, Bruno Magalhães took his first IRC win in the Azores, Paolo Andreucci won in Sanremo and Nasser Al-Attiyah won in Cyprus when many of the leading contenders skipped the event. Škoda took the manufacturers' championship after the Barum Rally Zlín in the Czech Republic.

== Calendar ==
Rd.	Start date	Finish date	Rally	Rally headquarters	Surface	Stages	Distance
1	19 January	23 January	(Monaco) 78th Rallye Automobile Monte-Carlo	Valence, Drôme	Mixed	14	396.18 km
2	4 March	6 March	(Brazil) 30th Rally Internacional de Curitiba	Curitiba, Paraná	Gravel	15	216.93 km
3	19 March	21 March	30th Rally Argentina	Carlos Paz, Córdoba	Gravel	15	231.45 km
4	29 April	1 May	(Spain) 34th Rally Islas Canarias - El Corte Inglés	Las Palmas, Gran Canaria	Asphalt	15	221.59 km
5	4 June	6 June	(Italy) 7th Rally d'Italia Sardegna	Olbia, Sardinia	Gravel	13	218.70 km
6	24 June	26 June	46th Belgium Geko Ypres Rally	Ypres, West Flanders	Asphalt	19	293.62 km
7	15 July	17 July	(Portugal) 45th SATA Rallye Açores	Ponta Delgada, Azores	Gravel	19	226.32 km
8	5 August	8 August	(Portugal) 51st Rali Vinho da Madeira	Funchal, Madeira	Asphalt	21	298.20 km
9	27 August	29 August	(Czech Republic) 40th Barum Rally Zlín	Zlín, Zlín Region	Asphalt	17	265.26 km
C	9 September	11 September	(Spain) 47th Rally Principe de Asturias	Oviedo, Asturias	Asphalt	13	256.14 km
10	23 September	25 September	(Italy) 52nd Rallye Sanremo	Sanremo, Liguria	Asphalt	11	220.03 km
11	15 October	17 October	(United Kingdom) 2nd Rally of Scotland	Perth, Scotland	Gravel	12	196.92 km
12	4 November	6 November	39th FxPro Cyprus Rally	Limassol	Gravel	14	229.34 km

The calendar consisted of twelve events run on two continents. Changes for 2010 season included the replacement of Rally Russia, Rally Japan and the Safari Rally with Rally Argentina, Rally d'Italia Sardegna and Cyprus Rally. In March it was announced that the Rally Islas Canarias would replace the Rally Principe de Asturias as the Spanish round on the schedule, moving from September to April.

== Selected entries ==
M-Sport (Ford) and Subaru became the latest registered manufacturers to join the Intercontinental Rally Challenge, alongside Abarth (Fiat), Honda, Ralliart (Mitsubishi), Peugeot, Proton and Škoda.

Entrant	Manufacturer	Car	Driver	Co-driver	Tyres	Rounds
(United Kingdom) Peugeot UK	Peugeot	Peugeot 207 S2000	(United Kingdom) Kris Meeke	(Republic of Ireland) Paul Nagle	BF	1–11
Peugeot France	Peugeot	Peugeot 207 S2000	(France) Sébastien Ogier	(France) Julien Ingrassia	BF	1
Peugeot France	Peugeot	Peugeot 207 S2000	(France) Sébastien Ogier	(France) Julien Ingrassia	P	5
Peugeot France	Peugeot	Peugeot 207 S2000	(France) Stéphane Sarrazin	(France) Jacques-Julien Renucci	BF	1, 6
Peugeot France	Peugeot	Peugeot 207 S2000	(France) Bryan Bouffier	(France) Xavier Panseri	BF	9–10
Peugeot Sport Portugal	Peugeot	Peugeot 207 S2000	(Portugal) Bruno Magalhães	(Portugal) Carlos Magalhães	BF	1–8, 10
(Austria) Interwetten Racing	Peugeot	Peugeot 207 S2000	(Austria) Franz Wittmann	(Germany) Klaus Wicha	BF	1, 4–5, 9
(Austria) Interwetten Racing	Peugeot	Peugeot 207 S2000	(Austria) Franz Wittmann	(Germany) Josefine Beinke	BF	12
(Austria) Interwetten Racing	Peugeot	Peugeot 207 S2000	(France) Bryan Bouffier	(France) Xavier Panseri	BF	12
(Italy) Kimera Motorsport	Peugeot	Peugeot 207 S2000	(Italy) Luca Betti	(Italy) Alessandro Mattioda	BF	1
(Italy) Kimera Motorsport	Peugeot	Peugeot 207 S2000	(Italy) Luca Betti	(Italy) Pierangelo Scalvini	BF	5
(Austria) Stohl Racing	Peugeot	Peugeot 207 S2000	(Brazil) Daniel Oliveira	(Spain) Carlos del Barrio	BF	1, 3–4, 6–10
(Austria) Stohl Racing	Peugeot	Peugeot 207 S2000	(Brazil) Daniel Oliveira	(France) Denis Giraudet	BF	2
(Austria) Stohl Racing	Peugeot	Peugeot 207 S2000	(Brazil) Daniel Oliveira	(Brazil) Armando Miranda	BF	11–12
(Belgium) Peugeot Team Belux	Peugeot	Peugeot 207 S2000	(Belgium) Thierry Neuville	(France) Nicolas Klinger	BF	4–6, 9–11
(Belgium) Peugeot Team Belux	Peugeot	Peugeot 207 S2000	(Belgium) Pieter Tsjoen	(Belgium) Eddy Chevaillier	BF	6
(Saudi Arabia) Yazeed Al Rajhi Team	Peugeot	Peugeot 207 S2000	(Saudi Arabia) Yazeed Al Rajhi	(France) Matthieu Baumel	BF	5
(Italy) F.P.F. Sport SRL	Peugeot	Peugeot 207 S2000	(Italy) Paolo Andreucci	(Italy) Anna Andreussi	P	5, 10
Peugeot Team Turkey	Peugeot	Peugeot 207 S2000	(Turkey) Burcu Çetinkaya	(Turkey) Çiçek Güney	Y	5–12
Bluthunder Racing Italy	Peugeot	Peugeot 207 S2000	(Italy) Corrado Fontana	(Italy) Nicola Arena	P	6, 8–9
Bluthunder Racing Italy	Peugeot	Peugeot 207 S2000	(Italy) Luigi Fontana	(Italy) Renzo Casazza	P	8
(Belgium) Duindistel	Peugeot	Peugeot 207 S2000	(Belgium) Patrick Snijers	(Belgium) Cindy Cokelaere	BF	6
(Belgium) Duindistel	Peugeot	Peugeot 207 S2000	(Belgium) Dominique Bruyneel	(Belgium) Lara Vanneste	BF	6, 8
(Belgium) Duindistel	Peugeot	Peugeot 207 S2000	(Belgium) Dominique Bruyneel	(France) Jean-Charles Descamps	BF	9
(Portugal) Amarante Rally Team	Peugeot	Peugeot 207 S2000	(Portugal) Vítor Pascoal	(Portugal) Mário Castro	P	7–8
(Italy) Power Car Team	Peugeot	Peugeot 207 S2000	(Italy) Marco Tempestini	(Romania) Dorin Pulpea	P	8
(Portugal) Team C.D. Nacional da Madeira	Peugeot	Peugeot 207 S2000	(Portugal) Miguel Nunes	(Portugal) Victor Calado	BF	8
(Cyprus) Nicos Thomas Racing	Peugeot	Peugeot 207 S2000	(Cyprus) Nicos Thomas	(Cyprus) Angelos Loizides	BF	12
(United Kingdom) M-Sport Ltd.	M-Sport	Ford Fiesta S2000	(Finland) Mikko Hirvonen	(Finland) Jarmo Lehtinen	P	1
(United Kingdom) M-Sport Ltd.	M-Sport	Ford Fiesta S2000	(France) Julien Maurin	(France) Gilles Thimonier	P	1
(United Kingdom) M-Sport Ltd.	M-Sport	Ford Fiesta S2000	(Norway) Andreas Mikkelsen	(Norway) Ola Fløene	H	5–7, 9–12
(Argentina) Munchi's Ford World Rally Team	M-Sport	Ford Fiesta S2000	(Argentina) Federico Villagra	(Argentina) Jorge Pérez Companc	P	3
(Spain) ESC. Ourense	M-Sport	Ford Fiesta S2000	(Spain) Sergio Vallejo	(Spain) Diego Vallejo	P	4
(Poland) Cersanit Rally Team	M-Sport	Ford Fiesta S2000	(Poland) Michał Sołowow	(Poland) Maciek Baran	P	6
(Portugal) Team Ford Quinta do Lorde	M-Sport	Ford Fiesta S2000	(Portugal) Bernardo Sousa	(Portugal) Nuno Rodrigues da Silva	P	7–8
(Spain) RMC Motorsport	M-Sport	Ford Fiesta S2000	(Portugal) Miguel Campos	(Portugal) Aloisio Monteiro	BF	8
(Czech Republic) Czech Ford Rally Team	M-Sport	Ford Fiesta S2000	(Czech Republic) Jaromír Tarabus	(Czech Republic) Daniel Trunkát	BF	9, 12
(Czech Republic) Czech Ford Rally Team	M-Sport	Ford Fiesta S2000	(Czech Republic) Martin Prokop	(Czech Republic) Jan Tománek	P	12
(Italy) Car Racing	M-Sport	Ford Fiesta S2000	(Italy) Umberto Scandola	(Italy) Guido D'Amore	BF	10
(Qatar) Barwa Rally Team	M-Sport	Ford Fiesta S2000	(Qatar) Nasser Al-Attiyah	(Italy) Giovanni Bernacchini	P	12
(Czech Republic) Škoda Motorsport	Škoda	Škoda Fabia S2000	(Czech Republic) Jan Kopecký	(Czech Republic) Petr Starý	BF	1–10
(Czech Republic) Škoda Motorsport	Škoda	Škoda Fabia S2000	(Finland) Juho Hänninen	(Finland) Mikko Markkula	BF	1–11
(Czech Republic) Škoda Motorsport	Škoda	Škoda Fabia S2000	(France) Nicolas Vouilloz	(France) Benjamin Veillas	BF	1
(Czech Republic) Škoda Motorsport	Škoda	Škoda Fabia S2000	(Belgium) Freddy Loix	(Belgium) Frédéric Miclotte	BF	6, 8–10
(United Kingdom) Škoda UK	Škoda	Škoda Fabia S2000	(United Kingdom) Guy Wilks	(United Kingdom) Phil Pugh	BF	1–5, 9–11
(Qatar) Barwa Rally Team	Škoda	Škoda Fabia S2000	(Qatar) Nasser Al-Attiyah	(Italy) Giovanni Bernacchini	P	3
(Spain) B9 Racing	Škoda	Škoda Fabia S2000	(Spain) Alberto Hevia	(Spain) Alberto Iglesias	BF	4
(Belgium) René Georges Rally Sport	Škoda	Škoda Fabia S2000	(Belgium) Bernd Casier	(Belgium) Francis Caesemaeker	BF	6
(Czech Republic) Škoda Delimax Czech National Team	Škoda	Škoda Fabia S2000	(Czech Republic) Pavel Valoušek	(Czech Republic) Zdeněk Hrůza	BF	9
(Czech Republic) Mogul Racing Team	Škoda	Škoda Fabia S2000	(Czech Republic) Roman Kresta	(Czech Republic) Petr Gross	BF	9
(Lebanon) Motortune Racing	Škoda	Škoda Fabia S2000	(Lebanon) Roger Feghali	(Lebanon) Joseph Matar	BF	12
(Italy) Astra Racing	Abarth	Abarth Grande Punto S2000	(Finland) Toni Gardemeister	(Finland) Tomi Tuominen	BF	1
(Italy) Procar	Abarth	Abarth Grande Punto S2000	(Italy) Luca Rossetti	(Italy) Matteo Chiarcossi	BF	8
(Italy) Abarth & C. Spa	Abarth	Abarth Grande Punto S2000	(Italy) Luca Rossetti	(Italy) Matteo Chiarcossi	BF	10
(Italy) Abarth & C. Spa	Abarth	Abarth Grande Punto S2000	(Italy) Giandomenico Basso	(Italy) Mitia Dotta	BF	10
(Finland) Tommi Mäkinen Racing	Subaru	Subaru Impreza WRX STI	(France) Bryan Bouffier	(France) Xavier Panseri	BF	1
(Argentina) Barattero	Subaru	Subaru Impreza WRX STI	(Argentina) Gabriel Pozzo	(Argentina) Daniel Stillo	P	3
(Argentina) Barattero	Subaru	Subaru Impreza WRX STI	(Argentina) Claudio Menzi	(Argentina) Diego Cagnotti	P	3
(Italy) Motoring Club	Subaru	Subaru Impreza WRX STI	(Finland) Teemu Arminen	(Finland) Tuomo Nikkola	BF	5
(San Marino) WAR Racing	Subaru	Subaru Impreza WRX STI	(Italy) Luigi Ricci	(Italy) Christine Pfister	Y	5
(Japan) Subaru Team Arai	Subaru	Subaru Impreza WRX STI	(Japan) Toshihiro Arai	(United Kingdom) Daniel Barritt	P	6
(Brazil) Intercontinental Motul	Ralliart	Mitsubishi Lancer Evo IX	(Brazil) Oswaldo Scheer	(Brazil) Gilvan Jablonski	Y	2
(Brazil) Intercontinental Motul	Ralliart	Mitsubishi Lancer Evo IX	(Brazil) Oswaldo Scheer	(Brazil) Sidinei Bröering	Y	3
(Brazil) Intercontinental Motul	Ralliart	Mitsubishi Lancer Evo IX	(Brazil) Eduardo Scheer	(Brazil) Geferson Pavinatto	Y	2–3
(Argentina) Tango Rally Team	Ralliart	Mitsubishi Lancer Evo IX	(Argentina) Federico Bassi	(Argentina) Jorge García Quiroga	BF	3
(Argentina) Tango Rally Team	Ralliart	Mitsubishi Lancer Evo IX	(Argentina) Agustín Elvíra	(Argentina) Oscar Tagle	BF	3
(Argentina) Tango Rally Team	Ralliart	Mitsubishi Lancer Evo IX	(Argentina) Agustín Rossi	(Argentina) Leonardo Suaya	BF	3
(Argentina) Tango Rally Team	Ralliart	Mitsubishi Lancer Evo IX	(Argentina) Gonzalo Monarca	(Argentina) Laureano Grigera	BF	3
(Portugal) Team Além Mar	Ralliart	Mitsubishi Lancer Evo IX	(Portugal) Ricardo Moura	(Portugal) Sancho Eiró	BF	7
(Portugal) Team Além Mar	Ralliart	Mitsubishi Lancer Evo IX	(Portugal) Ricardo Moura	(Portugal) António Costa	BF	8
(Czech Republic) EuroOil Čepro Czech National Team	Ralliart	Mitsubishi Lancer Evo IX	(Czech Republic) Václav Pech	(Czech Republic) Petr Uhel	BF	9
(Japan) Advan-Piaa Rally Team	Ralliart	Mitsubishi Lancer Evo IX	(Japan) Fumio Nutahara	(Japan) Hakaru Ichino	Y	9
(United Kingdom) DGM Sport	Ralliart	Mitsubishi Lancer Evo IX	(United Kingdom) Jonathan Greer	(United Kingdom) Dai Roberts	P	11
(United Kingdom) David Bogie Rallying	Ralliart	Mitsubishi Lancer Evo IX	(United Kingdom) David Bogie	(United Kingdom) Kevin Rae	P	11
(Czech Republic) Kresta Racing	Ralliart	Mitsubishi Lancer Evo IX	(Czech Republic) Roman Kresta	(Czech Republic) Petr Gross	P/H	12
(Argentina) Tango Rally Team	Ralliart	Mitsubishi Lancer Evo X	(Argentina) Nicolas Madero	(Argentina) Guillermo Piazzano	BF	3
(Argentina) Tango Rally Team	Ralliart	Mitsubishi Lancer Evo X	(Argentina) Marcos Ligato	(Argentina) Rubén García	BF	3
(Argentina) Tango Rally Team	Ralliart	Mitsubishi Lancer Evo X	(Argentina) Luciano Bernardi	(Argentina) Fabian Cretu	BF	3
(Argentina) Tango Rally Team	Ralliart	Mitsubishi Lancer Evo X	(Argentina) Alejandro Cancio	(Argentina) Santiego García	BF	3
(Argentina) Tango Rally Team	Ralliart	Mitsubishi Lancer Evo X	(Argentina) Juan Jose Gil de Marchi	(Argentina) Mauro Albornoz	BF	3
(Spain) Escudería GPR Sport	Ralliart	Mitsubishi Lancer Evo X	(Spain) Rubén Gracia	(Spain) Diego Sanjuan	BF	4
(United Kingdom) JRM Engineering	Ralliart	Mitsubishi Lancer Evo X	(Sweden) Per-Gunnar Andersson	(Sweden) Anders Fredriksson	P	5
(Netherlands) Heuvel Motorsport	Ralliart	Mitsubishi Lancer Evo X	(Netherlands) Jasper ven den Heuvel	(Netherlands) Martine Kolman	P	6
Proton R3 Malaysia Rally Team	Proton	Proton Satria Neo S2000	(Australia) Chris Atkinson	(Belgium) Stéphane Prévot	BF	6–7
Proton R3 Malaysia Rally Team	Proton	Proton Satria Neo S2000	(United Kingdom) Alister McRae	(Australia) Bill Hayes	BF	6–7, 11
Proton R3 Malaysia Rally Team	Proton	Proton Satria Neo S2000	(United Kingdom) Tom Cave	(United Kingdom) Craig Parry	BF	6–7, 11
Proton R3 Malaysia Rally Team	Proton	Proton Satria Neo S2000	(United Kingdom) Niall McShea	(United Kingdom) Marshall Clarke	BF	9–10
Proton R3 Malaysia Rally Team	Proton	Proton Satria Neo S2000	(Republic of Ireland) Keith Cronin	(Republic of Ireland) Barry McNulty	BF	9, 11
Proton R3 Malaysia Rally Team	Proton	Proton Satria Neo S2000	(France) Gilles Panizzi	(Monaco) Freddy Delorme	BF	10
(Estonia) Catwees Honda Racing	Honda	Honda Civic Type-R R3	(Estonia) Siim Plangi	(Estonia) Marek Sarapuu	BF	9, 11

== Results ==
Round	Rally name	Podium finishers			
Round	Rally name	Rank	Driver	Car	Time
1	(Monaco) / (France) Monte Carlo Rally (January 19–23) — Results and report	1	(Finland) Mikko Hirvonen	Ford Fiesta S2000	4:32:58.5
1	(Monaco) / (France) Monte Carlo Rally (January 19–23) — Results and report	2	(Finland) Juho Hänninen	Škoda Fabia S2000	4:34:49.9
1	(Monaco) / (France) Monte Carlo Rally (January 19–23) — Results and report	3	(France) Nicolas Vouilloz	Škoda Fabia S2000	4:36:17.6
2	(Brazil) Rally Internacional de Curitiba (March 4–6) — Results and report	1	(United Kingdom) Kris Meeke	Peugeot 207 S2000	1:42:45.4
2	(Brazil) Rally Internacional de Curitiba (March 4–6) — Results and report	2	(United Kingdom) Guy Wilks	Škoda Fabia S2000	1:43:32.1
2	(Brazil) Rally Internacional de Curitiba (March 4–6) — Results and report	3	(Finland) Juho Hänninen	Škoda Fabia S2000	1:44:05.6
3	Rally Argentina (March 19–21) — Results and report	1	(Finland) Juho Hänninen	Škoda Fabia S2000	2:30:38.1
3	Rally Argentina (March 19–21) — Results and report	2	(United Kingdom) Guy Wilks	Škoda Fabia S2000	2:31:29.1
3	Rally Argentina (March 19–21) — Results and report	3	(Czech Republic) Jan Kopecký	Škoda Fabia S2000	2:32:58.2
4	(Spain) Rally Islas Canarias (April 29 – May 1) — Results and report	1	(Czech Republic) Jan Kopecký	Škoda Fabia S2000	2:12:27.4
4	(Spain) Rally Islas Canarias (April 29 – May 1) — Results and report	2	(Finland) Juho Hänninen	Škoda Fabia S2000	2:12:36.5
4	(Spain) Rally Islas Canarias (April 29 – May 1) — Results and report	3	(United Kingdom) Guy Wilks	Škoda Fabia S2000	2:13:03.8
5	(Italy) Rally d'Italia Sardegna (June 4–6) — Results and report	1	(Finland) Juho Hänninen	Škoda Fabia S2000	2:31:28.6
5	(Italy) Rally d'Italia Sardegna (June 4–6) — Results and report	2	(Italy) Paolo Andreucci	Peugeot 207 S2000	2:32:04.2
5	(Italy) Rally d'Italia Sardegna (June 4–6) — Results and report	3	(Czech Republic) Jan Kopecký	Škoda Fabia S2000	2:32:06.8
6	(Belgium) Ypres Rally (June 24–26) — Results and report	1	(Belgium) Freddy Loix	Škoda Fabia S2000	2:35:36.9
6	(Belgium) Ypres Rally (June 24–26) — Results and report	2	(Czech Republic) Jan Kopecký	Škoda Fabia S2000	2:35:58.3
6	(Belgium) Ypres Rally (June 24–26) — Results and report	3	(Belgium) Thierry Neuville	Peugeot 207 S2000	2:37:42.4
7	(Portugal) Rallye Açores (July 15–17) — Results and report	1	(Portugal) Bruno Magalhães	Peugeot 207 S2000	2:34:00.4
7	(Portugal) Rallye Açores (July 15–17) — Results and report	2	(United Kingdom) Kris Meeke	Peugeot 207 S2000	2:35:00.5
7	(Portugal) Rallye Açores (July 15–17) — Results and report	3	(Finland) Juho Hänninen	Škoda Fabia S2000	2:35:21.1
8	(Portugal) Rali Vinho da Madeira (August 5–7) — Results and report	1	(Belgium) Freddy Loix	Škoda Fabia S2000	3:08:14.3
8	(Portugal) Rali Vinho da Madeira (August 5–7) — Results and report	2	(Czech Republic) Jan Kopecký	Škoda Fabia S2000	3:08:52.1
8	(Portugal) Rali Vinho da Madeira (August 5–7) — Results and report	3	(Finland) Juho Hänninen	Škoda Fabia S2000	3:10:40.1
9	(Czech Republic) Barum Czech Rally Zlín (August 27–29) — Results and report	1	(Belgium) Freddy Loix	Škoda Fabia S2000	2:31:31.0
9	(Czech Republic) Barum Czech Rally Zlín (August 27–29) — Results and report	2	(Finland) Juho Hänninen	Škoda Fabia S2000	2:31:56.0
9	(Czech Republic) Barum Czech Rally Zlín (August 27–29) — Results and report	3	(Czech Republic) Pavel Valoušek	Škoda Fabia S2000	2:32:51.2
10	(Italy) Rallye Sanremo (September 23–25) — Results and report	1	(Italy) Paolo Andreucci	Peugeot 207 S2000	2:35:32.7
10	(Italy) Rallye Sanremo (September 23–25) — Results and report	2	(Finland) Juho Hänninen	Škoda Fabia S2000	2:35:37.1
10	(Italy) Rallye Sanremo (September 23–25) — Results and report	3	(Belgium) Freddy Loix	Škoda Fabia S2000	2:36:06.8
11	(United Kingdom) Rally Scotland (October 15–17) — Results and report	1	(Finland) Juho Hänninen	Škoda Fabia S2000	2:01:07.4
11	(United Kingdom) Rally Scotland (October 15–17) — Results and report	2	(Norway) Andreas Mikkelsen	Ford Fiesta S2000	2:01:32.9
11	(United Kingdom) Rally Scotland (October 15–17) — Results and report	3	(United Kingdom) Kris Meeke	Peugeot 207 S2000	2:04:31.6
12	Cyprus Rally (November 4–6) — Results and report	1	(Qatar) Nasser Al-Attiyah	Ford Fiesta S2000	3:11:53.5
12	Cyprus Rally (November 4–6) — Results and report	2	(Lebanon) Roger Feghali	Škoda Fabia S2000	3:12:24.2
12	Cyprus Rally (November 4–6) — Results and report	3	(Czech Republic) Martin Prokop	Ford Fiesta S2000	3:16:35.5

== Standings ==
=== Drivers ===
- Only the best seven scores from each driver counted towards the championship.

Pos	Driver	MON (Monaco)	CUR (Brazil)	ARG (Argentina)	CAN (Spain)	SAR (Italy)	YPR (Belgium)	AZO (Portugal)	MAD (Portugal)	ZLI (Czech Republic)	SAN (Italy)	SCO (United Kingdom)	CYP (Cyprus)	T. Pts	Drop	Pts
1	(Finland) Juho Hänninen	2	3	1	2	1	Ret	3	3	2	2	1		80	18	62
2	(Czech Republic) Jan Kopecký	5	4	3	1	3	2	Ret	2	Ret	6			50	3	47
3	(United Kingdom) Kris Meeke	Ret	1	Ret	4	Ret	Ret	2	Ret	4	4	3		39		39
4	(Belgium) Freddy Loix						1		1	1	3			36		36
5	(Portugal) Bruno Magalhães	7	5	6	5	5	6	1	Ret		10			30		30
6	(United Kingdom) Guy Wilks	6	2	2	3	Ret				7	Ret	Ret		27		27
7	(Norway) Andreas Mikkelsen					Ret	5	4		5	Ret	2	Ret	21		21
8	(Italy) Paolo Andreucci					2					1			18		18
9	(Belgium) Thierry Neuville				Ret	4	3			Ret	8	Ret		12		12
10	(Qatar) Nasser Al-Attiyah			Ret									1	10		10
11	(Finland) Mikko Hirvonen	1												10		10
12	(Lebanon) Roger Feghali												2	8		8
13	(Czech Republic) Martin Prokop												3	6		6
14	(Czech Republic) Pavel Valoušek									3				6		6
15	(France) Nicolas Vouilloz	3												6		6
16	(Czech Republic) Jaromír Tarabus									8			4	6		6
17	(France) Stéphane Sarrazin	4					Ret							5		5
18	(United Kingdom) David Bogie											4		5		5
19	(Belgium) Bernd Casier						4							5		5
20	(Portugal) Miguel Nunes								4					5		5
21	(Argentina) Gabriel Pozzo			4										5		5
22	(Portugal) Ricardo Moura							5	10					4		4
23	(Italy) Luca Rossetti								Ret		5			4		4
24	(Portugal) Vítor Sá								5					4		4
25	(Cyprus) Nicos Thomas												5	4		4
26	(Argentina) Federico Villagra			5										4		4
27	(Estonia) Siim Plangi									Ret		6		4		4
28	(Portugal) Vítor Pascoal							6	18					3		3
29	(Czech Republic) Roman Kresta									Ret			6	3		3
30	(Brazil) Eduardo Scheer		6	Ret										3		3
31	(Finland) Teemu Arminen					6								3		3
32	(Portugal) Filipe Freitas								6					3		3
33	(Spain) Alberto Hevia				6									3		3
34	(Czech Republic) Václav Pech									6				3		3
35	(Republic of Ireland) Eamonn Boland	19										7		3		3
36	(Brazil) Daniel Oliveira	20	7	Ret	Ret		Ret		21	Ret	Ret	Ret	Ret	2		2
37	(Italy) Giandomenico Basso										7			2		2
38	(Argentina) Nicolás Madero			7										2		2
39	(Portugal) João Magalhães								7					2		2
40	(Italy) Luigi Ricci					7								2		2
41	(Poland) Michał Sołowow						7							2		2
42	(Cyprus) Charalambos Timotheou												7	2		2
43	(Portugal) Pedro Vale							7						2		2
44	(Turkey) Burcu Çetinkaya					Ret	Ret		19	44	38	8	15	2		2
45	(Spain) Ruben Gracia				12									2		2
46	(Italy) Daniele Batistini					8								1		1
47	(Italy) Luca Betti	Ret					8							1		1
48	(Paraguay) Diego Domínguez			8										1		1
49	(Portugal) Sérgio Silva							8						1		1
50	(Cyprus) Constantinos Tingirides												8	1		1
51	(France) Jean-Sébastien Vigion	8												1		1
52	(United Kingdom) Harry Hunt	34				12	Ret			49	48	9	19	1		1
53	(Portugal) Pedro Peres								9					1		1
54	(Brazil) Marcos Tokarski		11											1		1
55	(Spain) Sergio Vallejo				13									1		1
Pos	Driver	MON (Monaco)	CUR (Brazil)	ARG (Argentina)	CAN (Spain)	SAR (Italy)	YPR (Belgium)	AZO (Portugal)	MAD (Portugal)	ZLI (Czech Republic)	SAN (Italy)	SCO (United Kingdom)	CYP (Cyprus)	T. Pts	Drop	Pts

Key
Colour	Result
Gold	Winner
Silver	2nd place
Bronze	3rd place
Green	Points finish
Blue	Non-points finish
Blue	Non-classified finish (NC)
Purple	Did not finish (Ret)
Black	Excluded (EX)
Black	Disqualified (DSQ)
White	Did not start (DNS)
White	Cancelled (C)
Blank	Withdrew entry from the event (WD)

=== Manufacturers ===
- Only the best seven scores from each manufacturer counted towards the championship.

Pos	Manufacturer	MON (Monaco)	CUR (Brazil)	ARG (Argentina)	CAN (Spain)	SAR (Italy)	YPR (Belgium)	AZO (Portugal)	MAD (Portugal)	ZLI (Czech Republic)	SAN (Italy)	SCO (United Kingdom)	CYP (Cyprus)	T. Pts	Drop	Pts
1	(Czech Republic) Škoda	14	14	18	18	16	18	6	18	18	14	10	8	172	52	120
2	(France) Peugeot	7	14	3	9	13	9	18	9	5	15	8	4	114	27	87
3	(United Kingdom) M-Sport	10	0	4	1	0	6	5	0	5	0	9	16	56	1	55
4	(Japan) Ralliart	0	3	3	2	0	0	6	5	3	0	8	5	35	2	33
5	(Japan) Subaru	0	0	5	0	5	0	1	0	0	0	0	0	11		11
6	(Italy) Abarth	0	0	0	0	0	0	0	0	0	6	0	0	6		6
Pos	Manufacturer	MON (Monaco)	CUR (Brazil)	ARG (Argentina)	CAN (Spain)	SAR (Italy)	YPR (Belgium)	AZO (Portugal)	MAD (Portugal)	ZLI (Czech Republic)	SAN (Italy)	SCO (United Kingdom)	CYP (Cyprus)	T. Pts	Drop	Pts
