= Juho Hänninen =

Finnish rally driver (born 1981)

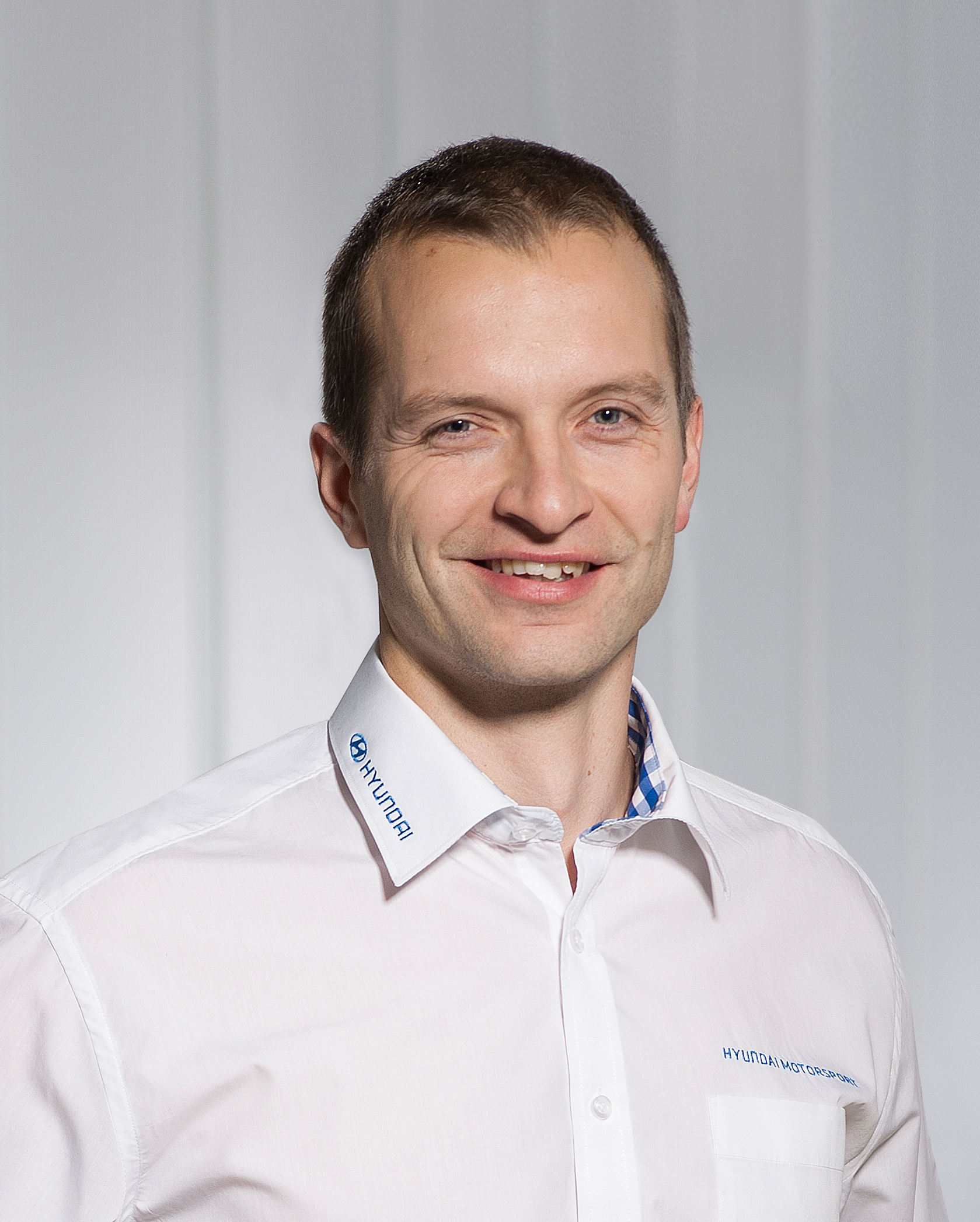
- Juho Hänninen in 2013

Personal information
- Nationality: (Finland) Finnish
- Full name: Juho Ville Matias Hänninen
- Born: 25 July 1981 (age 45); Punkaharju, Finland

World Rally Championship record
- Years active: 2006–2011, 2013–2015, 2017, 2019
- Co-driver: (Finland) Marko Sallinen (Finland) Mikko Markkula (Finland) Tomi Tuominen (Finland) Kaj Lindström
- Teams: RRE Sports, Ralliart New Zealand, Hyundai, Toyota
- Rallies: 57 (Note: Hänninen has started 56 events as a driver and one as a co-driver.)
- Championships: 0
- Rally wins: 0
- Podiums: 1
- Stage wins: 10
- Total points: 125
- First rally: 2006 Swedish Rally
- Last rally: 2019 Rally Italia Sardegna

Juho Ville Matias Hänninen (born 25 July 1981) is a Finnish rally driver. He is the 2010 Intercontinental Rally Challenge (IRC) champion and 2011 Super 2000 World Rally Championship (S-WRC) champion with co-driver Mikko Markkula driving a works entered Fabia S2000 for Red Bull Škoda. He also won the 2004 Group N Finnish Rally Championship title, and debuted in the World Rally Championship during the 2006 season.

== Career ==
Hänninen who was born in Punkaharju debuted in the Finnish Rally Championship in 2003, finishing eighth overall in the Group n (small Group N) standings. The next year, he won the title in the same class at the wheel of a Honda Civic Type R. In 2005, he finished second in the Group N class with a Mitsubishi Lancer Evolution VI.

Hänninen's first World Rally Championship event was the 2006 Swedish Rally, where he won the Group N class in his Lancer Evolution IX, and placed 15th overall. At his next rally, the Rally d'Italia Sardegna, Hänninen was again the fastest Group N driver and finished 14th overall. He competed in three more WRC events during the 2006 season, and achieved his best overall result at the Rally New Zealand, where he was ninth and second in the Group N class after Jari-Matti Latvala. In his debut in a World Rally Car in Finland, Hänninen was excluded for not wearing the correct fireproof underwear. At the season-ending Rally GB, Hänninen competed in a Super 1600 -class Citroën C2 and finished 19th overall, ahead of all the Junior World Rally Championship contestants.

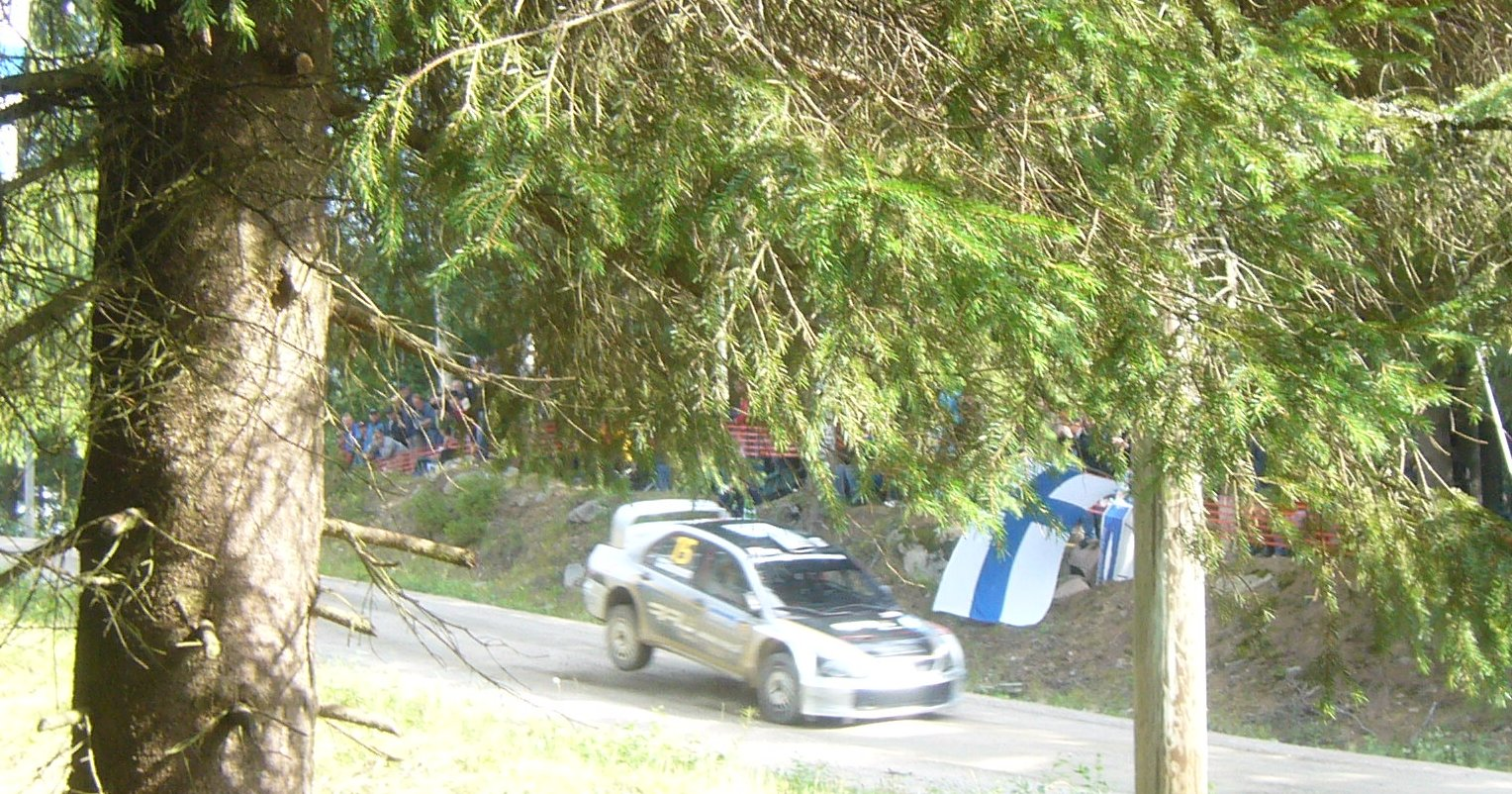
Hänninen with a Lancer WRC 05 at the 2007 Rally Finland.

In the 2007 season, Hänninen did a full six-event Production World Rally Championship (PWRC) programme in the Lancer Evolution IX. He initially won the Swedish Rally but was later disqualified for non-homologated fuel pumps. His best results then were a second place at the Rally GB and a third place in Argentina, and he placed fifth in the championship standings. He also competed in three World Rally Championship events in a Mitsubishi Lancer WRC05, taking his first WRC point by finishing eighth at the Rally d'Italia Sardegna.

In 2008, Hänninen is contesting the PWRC for the Ralliart New Zealand team. He won the Swedish Rally, also finishing eighth overall and taking his second WRC point, and the Rally Finland. He has also competed in two (IRC) events, taking fifth place with the Group N Lancer Evolution IX at the Rally Portugal and then winning his first rally in a Super 2000 car at the Rally Russia in a Peugeot 207 S2000.

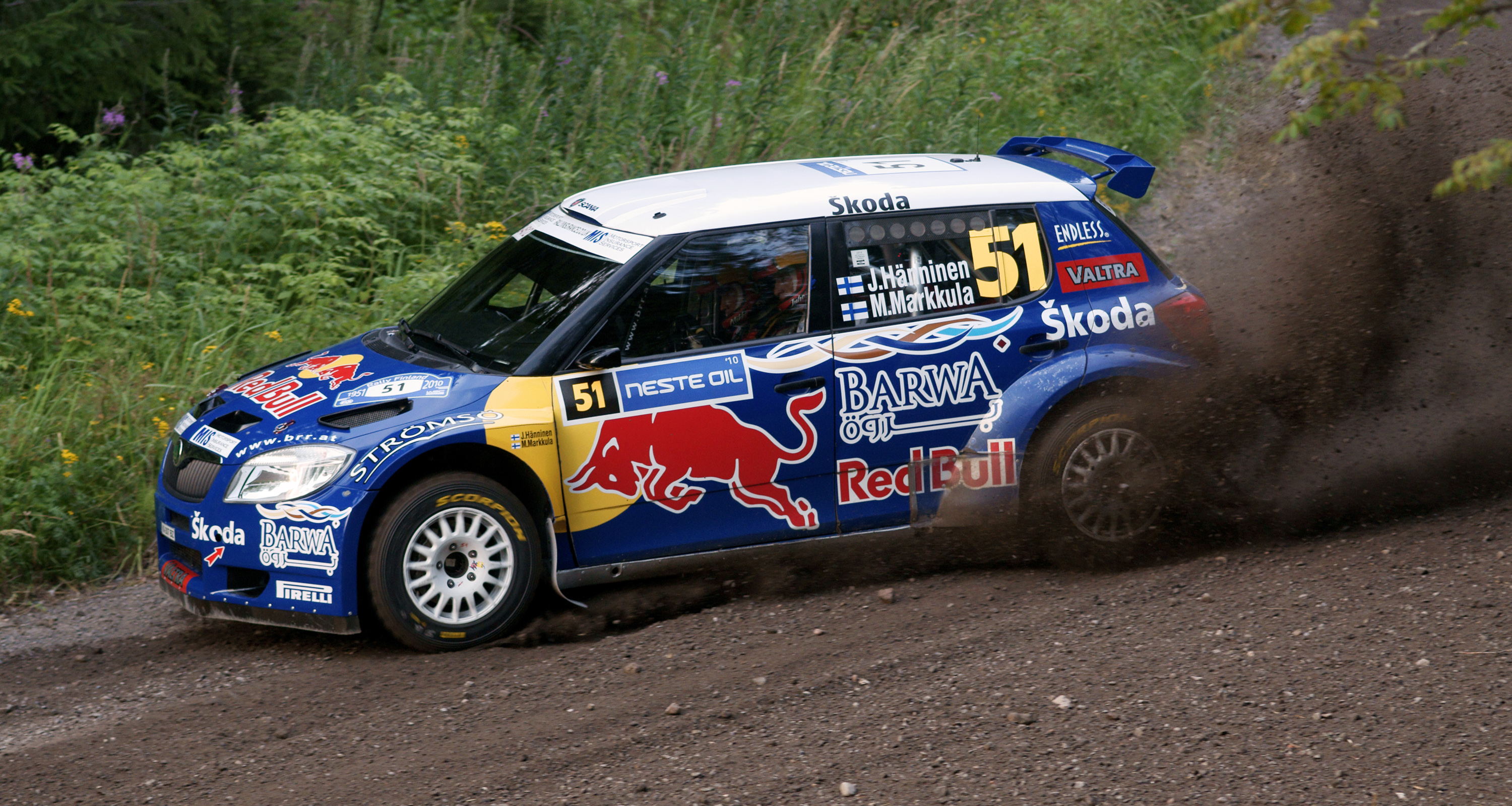
Hänninen with a Škoda Fabia S2000 at the 2010 Rally Finland.

In 2009, Hänninen contested the IRC for Škoda in a Škoda Fabia S2000, winning in Russia for the second year in succession and finishing sixth in the championship. Hänninen continued his relation with Škoda for the 2010 season. He became IRC champion after winning the 2010 Rally Scotland. He scored three wins, four second places and three third places and 62 points. Hänninen won Rally Argentina, Rally d´Italia Sardegna and Rally Scotland. Also as in 2009, Hänninen competed in 2010 Rally Finland driving a Škoda Fabia for the Red Bull Rally Team, winning the S-WRC class.

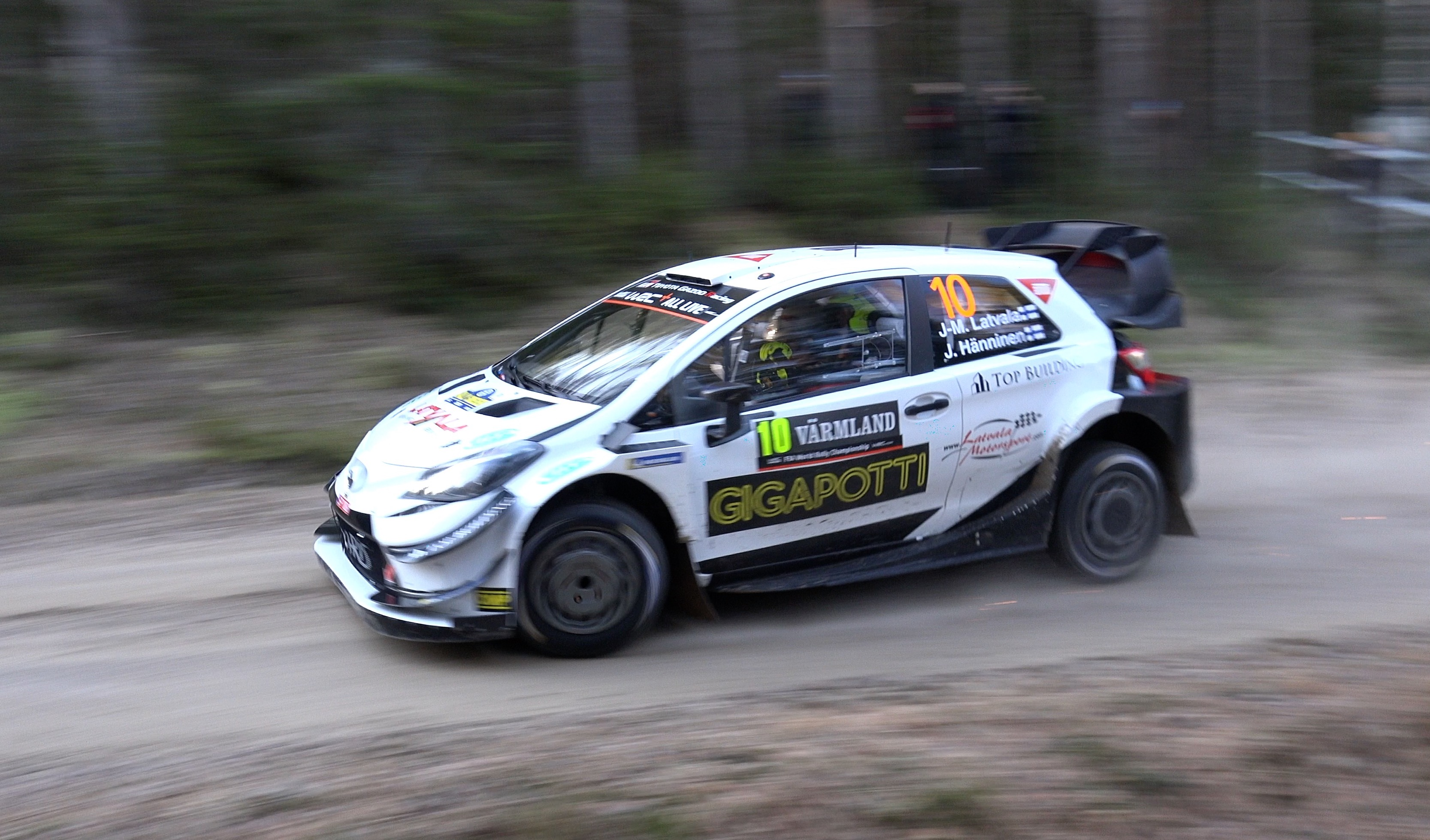
Hänninen co-driving Jari-Matti Latvala at the 2020 Rally Sweden.

For 2011, Hänninen competed in both IRC and S-WRC, driving for the Red Bull Škoda team in the S-WRC. He became the S-WRC champion after winning the Rally Catalunya.

Hänninen took his first ever stage win in the World Rally Championship at the 2013 Monte Carlo Rally, setting the fastest time on stage nine. On 8 July, Hyundai confirmed that it had signed Hänninen as an official test driver to develop the Hyundai i20 WRC.

== Results ==
=== WRC results ===
==== As driver ====
Year	Entrant	Car	1	2	3	4	5	6	7	8	9	10	11	12	13	14	15	16	WDC	Points
2006	Juho Hänninen	Mitsubishi Lancer Evo IX	MON	SWE; 15	MEX	ESP	FRA	ARG	ITA; 14	GRE	GER						NZL; 9		NC	0
2006	Juho Hänninen	Mitsubishi Lancer WRC 05										FIN; DSQ	JPN	CYP	TUR	AUS			NC	0
2006	Juho Hänninen	Citroën C2 S1600																GBR; 19	NC	0
2007	RRE Sports	Mitsubishi Lancer Evo IX	MON	SWE; DSQ				ARG; 11		GRE; Ret			NZL; 19			JPN; 23	IRE	GBR; 14	22nd	1
2007	Juho Hänninen	Mitsubishi Lancer WRC 05			NOR; 17	MEX	POR		ITA; 8		FIN; Ret	GER							22nd	1
2007	Juho Hänninen	Mitsubishi Lancer Evo IX												ESP; DSQ	FRA				22nd	1
2008	Ralliart New Zealand	Mitsubishi Lancer Evo IX	MON	SWE; 8	MEX	ARG	JOR	ITA	GRE; 20	TUR	FIN; 13	GER	NZL; 14			JPN; 10	GBR; Ret		19th	1
2008	Juho Hänninen	Mitsubishi Lancer Evo IX												ESP; 29	FRA; 24				19th	1
2009	Juho Hänninen	Škoda Fabia S2000	IRE	NOR	CYP	POR	ARG	ITA	GRC	POL	FIN; 10	AUS	ESP	GBR					NC	0
2010	Juho Hänninen	Škoda Fabia S2000	SWE	MEX	JOR	TUR	NZL	POR; Ret	BUL	FIN; 9	GER	JPN	FRA	ESP	GBR				20th	2
2011	Red Bull Škoda	Škoda Fabia S2000	SWE	MEX; 8	POR	JOR	ITA; 8	ARG	GRE; 8	FIN; 10	GER; 20	AUS	FRA; 26	ESP; 10	GBR				16th	14
2013	Qatar World Rally Team	Ford Fiesta RS WRC	MON; Ret	SWE; 6	MEX	POR	ARG	GRE	ITA										15th	8
2013	Juho Hänninen	Ford Fiesta RS WRC								FIN; 32	GER	AUS	FRA	ESP	GBR				15th	8
2014	Hyundai Shell World Rally Team	Hyundai i20 WRC	MON	SWE; 19	MEX	POR; 8	ARG	ITA; Ret	POL; 6	FIN; 6	GER	AUS	FRA	ESP	GBR; 30				13th	20
2015	Juho Hänninen	Ford Fiesta RS WRC	MON	SWE	MEX	ARG	POR	ITA	POL	FIN; 6	GER	AUS	FRA	ESP	GBR				14th	8
2017	Toyota Gazoo Racing WRT	Toyota Yaris WRC	MON; 16	SWE; 23	MEX; 7	FRA; Ret	ARG; 7	POR; 7	ITA; 6	POL; 10	FIN; 3	GER; 4	ESP; 4	GBR; Ret	AUS				9th	71
2019	Tommi Mäkinen Racing	Toyota Yaris WRC	MON	SWE	MEX	FRA	ARG	CHL	POR	ITA; Ret	FIN	GER	TUR	GBR	ESP	AUS; C			NC	0

==== As co-driver ====
Year	Entrant	Car	1	2	3	4	5	6	7	8	9	10	11	12	13	WDC	Points
2020	Latvala Motorsport	Toyota Yaris WRC	MON	SWE; Ret	MEX	EST	TUR	ITA	MNZ							NC	0
2023	Toyota Gazoo Racing WRT	Toyota GR Yaris Rally1	MON	SWE	MEX	CRO	POR	ITA	KEN	EST	FIN; 5	GRE	CHL	EUR	JPN	16th	11

=== PWRC results ===
Year	Entrant	Car	1	2	3	4	5	6	7	8	PWRC	Points
2007	Juho Hänninen	Mitsubishi Lancer Evo IX	SWE; DSQ	MEX							5th	18
2007	RRE Sports	Mitsubishi Lancer Evo IX			ARG; 3	GRE; Ret	NZL; 7	JPN; 7	IRE	GBR; 2	5th	18
2008	Ralliart New Zealand	Mitsubishi Lancer Evo IX	SWE; 1	ARG	GRE; 7	TUR	FIN; 1	NZL; 5	JPN; 1	GBR; Ret	2nd	36

=== SWRC results ===
Year	Entrant	Car	1	2	3	4	5	6	7	8	9	10	SWRC	Points
2010	Juho Hänninen	Škoda Fabia S2000	SWE	MEX	JOR	NZL	POR	FIN; 1	GER	JPN	FRA	GBR	10th	25
2011	Red Bull Škoda	Škoda Fabia S2000	MEX; 2	JOR	ITA; 2	GRE; 1	FIN; 1	GER; 4	FRA; 5	ESP; 1			1st	138

=== IRC results ===
Year	Entrant	Car	1	2	3	4	5	6	7	8	9	10	11	12	13	WDC	Points
2008	Juho Hänninen	Mitsubishi Lancer Evo 9	TUR	POR; 5	BEL		POR	CZE	ESP	ITA	SWI	CHI				8th	14
2008	Juho Hänninen	Peugeot 207 S2000				RUS; 1										8th	14
2009	Škoda Motorsport	Škoda Fabia S2000	MON; Ret	BRA	KEN	POR; Ret	BEL; 5	RUS; 1	POR	CZE; 3	ESP	ITA; 8	SCO			6th	21
2010	Škoda Motorsport	Škoda Fabia S2000	MON; 2	BRA; 3	ARG; 1	CAN; 2	ITA; 1	BEL; Ret	AZO; 3	MAD; 3	CZE; 2	ITA; 2	SCO; 1	CYP		1st	62
2011	Škoda Motorsport	Škoda Fabia S2000	MON; 6	CAN; 1	COR	YAL; 1	YPR	AZO; 1	ZLI; 3	MEC	SAN	SCO; 2	CYP; 16			3rd	125
2012	Škoda Motorsport	Škoda Fabia S2000	AZO; 2	CAN	IRL; 1	COR	MEC	YPR; 1	SMR	ROM	ZLI; 1	YAL	SLI	SAN; Ret	CYP	3rd	93

=== ERC results ===
Year	Entrant	Car	1	2	3	4	5	6	7	8	9	10	11	ERC	Points
2012	Škoda Motorsport	Škoda Fabia S2000	JÄN; 2	MIL; 4	CRO; 1	BUL	YPR; 1	BOS; 1	MAD; 7	CZE; 1	AST	POL	VAL	1st	203

== Notes ==
Sporting positions
Preceded by Kris Meeke	Intercontinental Rally Challenge Champion; 2010	Succeeded by Andreas Mikkelsen
Preceded by Luca Rossetti	European Rally Champion; 2012	Succeeded by Jan Kopecký
