= 2011 Rally Islas Canarias =

Motor rally competition

2011 Rally Islas Canarias 35º Trophy El Corte Inglés
Round 2 of the 2011 Intercontinental Rally Challenge season
← Previous event	Next event →
- Host country: (Spain) Canary Islands
- Rally base: Las Palmas
- Dates run: 14 – 16 April 2011
- Stages: 12 (190.59 km; 118.43 miles)
- Stage surface: Asphalt
- Overall distance: 668.28 km (415.25 miles)

Statistics
- Crews: 76 at start

Overall results
- Overall winner: (Finland) Juho Hänninen (Czech Republic) Škoda Motorsport

The 2011 Rally Islas Canarias, was the second round of the 2011 Intercontinental Rally Challenge (IRC) season. The twelve stage asphalt rally took place on the island of Gran Canaria between 14 and 16 April 2011. The rally was also a round of the Spanish Asphalt Championship.

== The beginning ==
The rally was based in the capital, Las Palmas, with a ceremonial launch on Thursday 14 April 2011. Day one consisted of eight stages covering a total of 116.81 km (72.58 mi) and included two night stages. Day two covered a total of 73.78 km (45.84 mi) over four stages. A total of seventy-six cars contested the event made up of thirty-five IRC entries and a further forty-one from the Spanish championship. Current IRC champion Juho Hänninen was seeded number one.

== Results ==
With four stage victories, Juho Hänninen won on asphalt for the first time in the Intercontinental Rally Challenge, just edging out Škoda Motorsport team-mate Jan Kopecký by 1.5 seconds. Third and fourth places went to the Belgian pairing of Thierry Neuville and Freddy Loix.

=== Overall ===
Pos.	Driver	Co-driver	Car	Time	Difference	Points
1.	(Finland) Juho Hänninen	(Finland) Mikko Markkula	Škoda Fabia S2000	1:40:38.1	0.0	25
2.	(Czech Republic) Jan Kopecký	(Czech Republic) Petr Starý	Škoda Fabia S2000	1:40:39.6	1.5	18
3.	(Belgium) Thierry Neuville	(Belgium) Nicolas Gilsoul	Peugeot 207 S2000	1:40:46.3	8.2	15
4.	(Belgium) Freddy Loix	(Belgium) Frédéric Miclotte	Škoda Fabia S2000	1:40:54.8	16.7	12
5.	(United Kingdom) Guy Wilks	(United Kingdom) Phil Pugh	Peugeot 207 S2000	1:41:26.4	48.3	10
6.	(Norway) Andreas Mikkelsen	(Norway) Ola Fløene	Škoda Fabia S2000	1:41:33.7	55.6	8
7. (8.)	(France) Bryan Bouffier	(France) Xavier Panseri	Peugeot 207 S2000	1:41:38.7	1:00.6	6
8. (9.)	(Portugal) Bruno Magalhães	(Portugal) Paulo Grave	Peugeot 207 S2000	1:42:27.9	1:49.8	4
9. (11.)	(Italy) Giandomenico Basso	(Italy) Mitia Dotta	Proton Satria Neo S2000	1:43:15.9	2:37.8	2
10. (12.)	(Finland) Toni Gardemeister	(Finland) Tapio Suominen	Škoda Fabia S2000	1:43:16.3	2:38.2	1

=== Special stages ===
Day	Stage	Time	Name	Length	Winner	Time	Avg. spd.	Rally leader
Leg 1 (15 Apr)	SS1	13:48	Gran Canaria 1	1.50 km	(United Kingdom) Guy Wilks	1:23.2	64.90 km/h	(United Kingdom) Guy Wilks
Leg 1 (15 Apr)	SS2	14:11	Santa Lucía 1	24.57 km	(Czech Republic) Jan Kopecký	14:08.4	104.26 km/h	(Czech Republic) Jan Kopecký
Leg 1 (15 Apr)	SS3	15:04	Ingenio 1	14.19 km	(United Kingdom) Guy Wilks	8:20.8	102.00 km/h	(Czech Republic) Jan Kopecký
Leg 1 (15 Apr)	SS4	17:22	Gran Canaria 2	1.50 km	(Czech Republic) Jan Kopecký (Belgium) Thierry Neuville	1:22.9	65.14 km/h	(Czech Republic) Jan Kopecký
Leg 1 (15 Apr)	SS5	17:45	Santa Lucía 2	24.57 km	(Czech Republic) Jan Kopecký	13:59.9	105.31 km/h	(Czech Republic) Jan Kopecký
Leg 1 (15 Apr)	SS6	18:38	Ingenio 2	14.19 km	(Finland) Juho Hänninen	8:18.1	102.56 km/h	(Czech Republic) Jan Kopecký
Leg 1 (15 Apr)	SS7	22:16	Valleseco	13.22 km	(Czech Republic) Jan Kopecký	8:18.4	95.49 km/h	(Czech Republic) Jan Kopecký
Leg 1 (15 Apr)	SS8	22:49	Tejeda	23.07 km	stage cancelled			(Czech Republic) Jan Kopecký
Leg 2 (16 Apr)	SS9	08:35	San Mateo 1	23.42 km	(Finland) Juho Hänninen	13:53.8	101.12 km/h	(Belgium) Thierry Neuville
Leg 2 (16 Apr)	SS10	09:22	Artenara 1	13.47 km	(Finland) Juho Hänninen	8:24.6	96.10 km/h	(Finland) Juho Hänninen
Leg 2 (16 Apr)	SS11	12:06	San Mateo 2	23.42 km	(Finland) Juho Hänninen	13:49.5	101.64 km/h	(Finland) Juho Hänninen
Leg 2 (16 Apr)	SS12	12:53	Artenara 2	13.47 km	(Czech Republic) Jan Kopecký	8:22.9	96.42 km/h	(Finland) Juho Hänninen
