= 2009 Monte Carlo Rally =

Motor rally competition

2009 Monte Carlo Rally 77ème Rallye Automobile de Monte-Carlo
Round 1 of the 2009 Intercontinental Rally Challenge season
Next event →
- Host country: Monaco
- Rally base: Monte Carlo
- Dates run: January 21 – 24 2009
- Stage surface: Tarmac

Statistics
- Crews: 47 at start, 29 at finish

Overall results
- Overall winner: (France) Sébastien Ogier (Belgium) BF Goodrich

The 2009 Monte-Carlo Rally, officially 77ème Rallye Automobile de Monte-Carlo was the first round of the 2009 Intercontinental Rally Challenge season. The rally took place between January 21–24, 2009 and was won by Sébastien Ogier, who was making his début in the series.

== Results ==
Pos.	Driver	Co-driver	Car	Time	Difference	Points
IRC
1	(France) Sébastien Ogier	(France) Julien Ingrassia	Peugeot 207 S2000	4:40:45.7	0.0	10
2	(Belgium) Freddy Loix	(Belgium) Isidoor Smets	Peugeot 207 S2000	4:42:29.3	+1:43.6	8
3	(France) Stéphane Sarrazin	(France) Jaqcues-Julien Renucci	Peugeot 207 S2000	4:43:07.3	+2:21.6	6
4	(Czech Republic) Jan Kopecký	(Czech Republic) Petr Stary	Škoda Fabia S2000	4:44:03.0	+3:17.3	5
5	(Italy) Giandomenico Basso	(Italy) Mitia Dotta	Abarth Grande Punto S2000	4:45:13.7	+4:28.0	4
6	(France) Frédéric Romeyer	(France) Thomas Fournel	Mitsubishi Lancer Evolution IX	5:01:16.0	+20:30.3	3
7	(Switzerland) Olivier Burri	(France) Fabrice Gordon	Abarth Grande Punto S2000	5:02:08.7	+21:23.0	2
8	(France) Patrick Artru	(France) Patrice Virieux	Mitsubishi Lancer Evolution IX	5:06:36.4	+25:50.7	1
