= 2010 Rallye Sanremo =

Motor rally competition

2010 Rallye Sanremo 52º Rallye Sanremo
Round 10 of the 2010 Intercontinental Rally Challenge season
← Previous event	Next event →
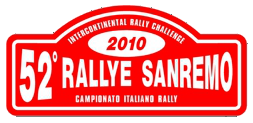
- Rallye Sanremo Logo
- Host country: Italy
- Rally base: Sanremo
- Dates run: 23 – 25 September 2010
- Stages: 11 (220.03 km; 136.72 miles)
- Stage surface: Asphalt
- Overall distance: 465.63 km (289.33 miles)

Statistics
- Crews: 102 at start, 61 at finish

Overall results
- Overall winner: (Italy) Paolo Andreucci (Italy) F.P.F. Sport SRL

The 2010 Rallye Sanremo (52º Rallye Sanremo), was the 10th round of the 2010 Intercontinental Rally Challenge (IRC) season and was also a round of the Italian Rally Championship. The eleven stage asphalt rally took place on 23–25 September 2010. The longest stage of the rally, Ronde, was run in darkness. All other stages were run in daylight.

== Introduction ==
The rally took place in the province of Imperia, with a total length of 465.63 km (289.33 mi), 220.03 km (136.72 mi) of which were special stages. The rally base was located along the sea front and the old railway station in the heart of the town of Sanremo. A record breaking entry of 30 S2000 cars contested the last all-asphalt IRC event of the year. In addition to the top six runners in the IRC, Proton entered three-time Sanremo winner Gilles Panizzi to partner alongside Niall McShea.

== Results ==
Paolo Andreucci became the seventh victor of an IRC rally in 2010, after holding off Juho Hänninen by just 4.4 seconds, with Freddy Loix just edging out Kris Meeke for the final podium position with a stage-winning time on the final stage. Meeke had held the lead of the rally for the first three of the rally's eleven stages before Andreucci claimed the rally lead through the Apricale test. Abarth's Giandomenico Basso led the rally at the end of day one, setting a time some fifteen seconds quicker than his rivals on the night-time Ronde test of 44 kilometres. Basso would eventually slip to seventh in the final classification. Hänninen cut into Andreucci's lead on day two, with the championship leader falling narrowly short of Andreucci, who claimed his first victory in the IRC. Hänninen's second place allowed him to advance two points in the championship standings due to an improvement on dropped scores, while rival Jan Kopecký could do no better than sixth, and thus failing to improve his points total.

=== Overall ===
Pos.	Driver	Co-driver	Car	Time	Difference	Points
1.	(Italy) Paolo Andreucci	(Italy) Anna Andreussi	Peugeot 207 S2000	2:35:32.7	0.0	10
2.	(Finland) Juho Hänninen	(Finland) Mikko Markkula	Škoda Fabia S2000	2:35:37.1	4.4	8
3.	(Belgium) Freddy Loix	(Belgium) Fréderic Miclotte	Škoda Fabia S2000	2:36:06.8	34.1	6
4.	(United Kingdom) Kris Meeke	(Republic of Ireland) Paul Nagle	Peugeot 207 S2000	2:36:11.0	38.3	5
5.	(Italy) Luca Rossetti	(Italy) Matteo Chiarcossi	Abarth Grande Punto S2000	2:36:53.7	1:21.0	4
6.	(Czech Republic) Jan Kopecký	(Czech Republic) Petr Starý	Škoda Fabia S2000	2:37:32.6	1:59.9	3
7.	(Italy) Giandomenico Basso	(Italy) Mitia Dotta	Abarth Grande Punto S2000	2:37:50.6	2:17.9	2
8.	(Belgium) Thierry Neuville	(France) Nicolas Klinger	Peugeot 207 S2000	2:38:07.7	2:35.0	1

=== Special stages ===
Day	Stage	Time	Name	Length	Winner	Time	Avg. spd.	Rally leader
Leg 1 (24 Sept)	SS1	13:34	Coldirodi 1	12.92 km	(United Kingdom) Kris Meeke	8:36.6	90.03 km/h	(United Kingdom) Kris Meeke
Leg 1 (24 Sept)	SS2	14:28	Bignone 1	10.62 km	(Italy) Paolo Andreucci	7:05.6	89.83 km/h	(United Kingdom) Kris Meeke
Leg 1 (24 Sept)	SS3	16:34	Coldirodi 2	12.92 km	(United Kingdom) Kris Meeke	8:39.5	89.53 km/h	(United Kingdom) Kris Meeke
Leg 1 (24 Sept)	SS4	16:56	Apricale	17.53 km	(Italy) Paolo Andreucci	12:51.9	81.76 km/h	(Italy) Paolo Andreucci
Leg 1 (24 Sept)	SS5	17:23	Bignone 2	10.62 km	(Italy) Paolo Andreucci (Italy) Luca Rossetti	7:10.5	88.81 km/h	(Italy) Paolo Andreucci
Leg 1 (24 Sept)	SS6	22:09	Ronde	44.00 km	(Italy) Giandomenico Basso	31:07.7	84.81 km/h	(Italy) Giandomenico Basso
Leg 2 (25 Sept)	SS7	09:00	Monte Ceppo	29.56 km	(Finland) Juho Hänninen	21:16.2	83.39 km/h	(Italy) Paolo Andreucci
Leg 2 (25 Sept)	SS8	09:45	Teglia 1	29.03 km	(Italy) Luca Rossetti	20:23.5	85.42 km/h	(Italy) Paolo Andreucci
Leg 2 (25 Sept)	SS9	13:00	Bajardo	1.73 km	(Finland) Juho Hänninen	1:17.9	79.95 km/h	(Italy) Paolo Andreucci
Leg 2 (25 Sept)	SS10	13:14	Ceppo Short	22.07 km	(Italy) Paolo Andreucci	15:44.9	84.09 km/h	(Italy) Paolo Andreucci
Leg 2 (25 Sept)	SS11	13:50	Teglia 2	29.03 km	(Belgium) Freddy Loix	20:06.3	86.64 km/h	(Italy) Paolo Andreucci
