= 2010 Rally d'Italia Sardegna =

Season of the Sardinian Rally

2010 Rally d'Italia Sardegna 7º Rally d'Italia Sardegna
Round 5 of the 2010 Intercontinental Rally Challenge
← Previous event	Next event →
- Rally d'Italia Sardegna Logo
- Host country: Italy
- Rally base: Olbia, Sardinia
- Dates run: June 4 – 6 2010
- Stages: 13 (218.70 km; 135.89 miles)
- Stage surface: Gravel
- Overall distance: 985.60 km (612.42 miles)

Statistics
- Crews: 43 at start, 21 at finish

Overall results
- Overall winner: (Finland) Juho Hänninen (Czech Republic) Škoda Motorsport

The 2010 Rally d'Italia Sardegna was the seventh Rally d'Italia Sardegna and the fifth round of the 2010 Intercontinental Rally Challenge and also counted towards the Italian Gravel Rally Trophy. The rally was held together with the Rally del Corallo, the Italian round of the FIA European Historic Rally Championship with the cars running after the main rally. The event was held between 4–6 June 2010. Four of the stages were broadcast live on Eurosport.

== Introduction ==
The rally was due to start on Friday 4 June 2010 with a single special stage in Cagliari, Sardinia, but this was cancelled. Saturday consisted of six special stages covering a total of 112.16 km (69.69 mi) on gravel roads all run in daylight. Sunday saw a further 106.54 km (66.20 mi) daylight gravel stages with the finish in Porto Cervo.

The leading four drivers in the championship standing were all confirmed for the event and in addition to this the Italian champion Paolo Andreucci and WRC star Sébastien Ogier also took part.

== Results ==
Championship leader Juho Hänninen won his second rally of the season, as he extended his championship lead over Jan Kopecký to eleven points. Defending series champion Kris Meeke and Guy Wilks, two of Hänninen's other title rivals both crashed out of the event. Wilks suffering fractured vertebrae in his crash on stage 2 and Meeke's crash, on stage 9, was caught live on television. Sébastien Ogier was also a victim of the hard stages, suffering a puncture on Stage 2 before retiring on the same stage with engine problems.

=== Overall ===
Pos.	Driver	Co-driver	Car	Time	Difference	Points
1.	(Finland) Juho Hänninen	(Finland) Mikko Markkula	Škoda Fabia S2000	2:31:28.6	0.0	10
2.	(Italy) Paolo Andreucci	(Italy) Anna Andreussi	Peugeot 207 S2000	2:32:04.2	35.6	8
3.	(Czech Republic) Jan Kopecký	(Czech Republic) Petr Starý	Škoda Fabia S2000	2:32:06.8	38.2	6
4.	(Belgium) Thierry Neuville	(France) Nicolas Klinger	Peugeot 207 S2000	2:37:27.2	5:58.6	5
5.	(Portugal) Bruno Magalhães	(Portugal) Carlos Magalhães	Peugeot 207 S2000	2:41:24.4	9:55.8	4
6.	(Finland) Teemu Arminen	(Finland) Tuomo Nikkola	Subaru Impreza WRX STI	2:41:40.9	10:12.3	3
7.	(Italy) Luigi Ricci	(Italy) Maurizio Barone	Subaru Impreza WRX STI	2:43:02.0	11:33.4	2
8.	(Italy) Daniele Batistini	(Italy) Carlo Pisano	Peugeot 207 S2000	2:43:26.7	11:58.1	1

=== Special stages ===
Day	Stage	Time	Name	Length	Winner	Time	Avg. spd.	Rally leader
1 (4 Jun)	SS1	20:04	Città di Cagliari	2.00 km	stage cancelled			
2 (5 Jun)	SS2	08:52	Monte Grighine I	28.66 km	(Czech Republic) Jan Kopecký	19:05.8	90.05 km/h	(Czech Republic) Jan Kopecký
2 (5 Jun)	SS3	10:16	Gonnosnò I	14.53 km	(Italy) Paolo Andreucci	10:22.5	84.03 km/h	(Italy) Paolo Andreucci
2 (5 Jun)	SS4	12:05	Monte Grighine II	28.66 km	(United Kingdom) Kris Meeke	18:43.7	91.82 km/h	(United Kingdom) Kris Meeke
2 (5 Jun)	SS5	13:29	Gonnosnò II	14.53 km	(Czech Republic) Jan Kopecký	10:06.5	86.25 km/h	(United Kingdom) Kris Meeke
2 (5 Jun)	SS6	17:23	Monte Lerno I	11.89 km	(Italy) Paolo Andreucci	7:30.2	95.08 km/h	(Italy) Paolo Andreucci
2 (5 Jun)	SS7	19:17	Monte Lerno II	11.89 km	(Italy) Paolo Andreucci	7:19.7	97.35 km/h	(Italy) Paolo Andreucci
3 (6 Jun)	SS8	09:00	Coiluna I	25.97 km	(United Kingdom) Kris Meeke	18:16.6	85.26 km/h	(United Kingdom) Kris Meeke
3 (6 Jun)	SS9	10:09	Terranova I	13.18 km	(Czech Republic) Jan Kopecký	9:54.3	79.84 km/h	(Finland) Juho Hänninen
3 (6 Jun)	SS10	11:50	Coiluna II	25.97 km	(Finland) Juho Hänninen	17:51.1	87.29 km/h	(Finland) Juho Hänninen
3 (6 Jun)	SS11	15:21	Monte Olia I	14.12 km	(Italy) Paolo Andreucci	11:00.4	76.97 km/h	(Finland) Juho Hänninen
3 (6 Jun)	SS12	16:05	Terranova II	13.18 km	(Finland) Juho Hänninen	9:47.0	80.83 km/h	(Finland) Juho Hänninen
3 (6 Jun)	SS13	16:54	Monte Olia II	14.12 km	(Italy) Paolo Andreucci	10:44.3	78.89 km/h	(Finland) Juho Hänninen
