= Škoda Motorsport IRC results =

The table below shows all results of Škoda Motorsport in the Intercontinental Rally Challenge.

Škoda Motorsport

Year	Car	Driver	1	2	3	4	5	6	7	8	9	10	11	12	13	DC	Points	MC	Points
2009	Škoda Fabia S2000	(Czech Republic) Jan Kopecký	MON; 4	BRA	KEN	POR; 2	BEL; 2	RUS; 2	POR	CZE; 1	ESP; 1	ITA; Ret	SCO			2nd	49	2nd	82
2009	Škoda Fabia S2000	(Finland) Juho Hänninen	MON; Ret	BRA	KEN	POR; Ret	BEL; 5	RUS; 1	POR	CZE; 3	ESP	ITA; 8	SCO			6th	21	2nd	82
2010	Škoda Fabia S2000	(Finland) Juho Hänninen	MON; 2	BRA; 3	ARG; 1	CAN; 2	ITA; 1	BEL; Ret	AZO; 3	MAD; 3	CZE; 2	ITA; 2	SCO; 1	CYP		1st	62	1st	120
2010	Škoda Fabia S2000	(Czech Republic) Jan Kopecký	MON; 5	BRA; 4	ARG; 3	CAN; 1	ITA; 3	BEL; 2	AZO; Ret	MAD; 2	CZE; Ret	ITA; 6	SCO	CYP		2nd	47	1st	120
2010	Škoda Fabia S2000	(France) Nicolas Vouilloz	MON; 3	BRA	ARG	CAN	ITA	BEL	AZO	MAD	CZE	ITA	SCO	CYP		13th	6	1st	120
2011	Škoda Fabia S2000	(Czech Republic) Jan Kopecký	MON; 8	CAN; 2	FRA; 2	UKR; 3	BEL; DNS	AZO; 3	CZE; 1	HUN; 1	ITA; 4	SCO; 5	CYP; 2			2nd	152	1st	362.5
2011	Škoda Fabia S2000	(Finland) Juho Hänninen	MON; 6	CAN; 1	FRA	UKR; 1	BEL	AZO; 1	CZE; 3	HUN	ITA	SCO; 2	CYP; 16			3rd	125	1st	362.5
2011	Škoda Fabia S2000	(Belgium) Freddy Loix	MON; 2	CAN; 4	FRA; 3	UKR	BEL; 1	AZO	CZE; 2	HUN; 3	ITA; Ret	SCO	CYP; 5			4th	123	1st	362.5
2011	Škoda Fabia S2000	(France) Nicolas Vouilloz	MON; 7	CAN	FRA	UKR	BEL	AZO	CZE	HUN	ITA	SCO	CYP			26th	6	1st	362.5
2012	Škoda Fabia S2000	(Czech Republic) Jan Kopecký	AZO	CAN; 1	IRL; 3	COR; 2	TAR; 1	YPR	SMR	ROM	ZLI; Ret	YAL	SLI	SAN; 2	CYP	2nd	101	1st	348
2012	Škoda Fabia S2000	(Finland) Juho Hänninen	AZO; 2	CAN	IRL; 1	COR	TAR	YPR; 1	SMR	ROM	ZLI; 1	YAL	SLI	SAN; Ret	CYP	3rd	93	1st	348

Škoda UK

Year	Car	Driver	1	2	3	4	5	6	7	8	9	10	11	12	13	DC	Points
2009	Škoda Fabia S2000	(United Kingdom) Guy Wilks	MON	BRA	KEN	POR	BEL	RUS	POR	CZE	ESP	ITA	SCO; 1			7th*	15*
2010	Škoda Fabia S2000	(United Kingdom) Guy Wilks	MON; 6	BRA; 2	ARG; 2	CAN; 3	ITA; Ret	BEL	AZO	MAD	CZE; 7	ITA; Ret	SCO; Ret	CYP		6th	27
2011	Škoda Fabia S2000	(Norway) Andreas Mikkelsen	MON; Ret	CAN; 6	FRA; 6	UKR; 4	BEL; Ret	AZO; 2	CZE; 5	HUN; Ret	ITA; 2	SCO; 1	CYP; 1			1st	153.5
2012	Škoda Fabia S2000	(Norway) Andreas Mikkelsen	AZO; 1	CAN; 2	IRL; 2	COR; 5	TAR; 2	YPR; Ret	SMR; 2	ROM; 1	ZLI; 8	YAL	SLI	SAN	CYP; 2	1st	150

* Including 5 points that Wilks scored with Proton Satria Neo S2000 at Rally Russia.

Other major entries

Year	Car	Entrant	Driver	1	2	3	4	5	6	7	8	9	10	11	12	13	DC	Points
2009	Škoda Fabia S2000	François Duval	(Belgium) François Duval	MON	BRA	KEN	POR	BEL; Ret	RUS	POR	CZE	ESP	ITA	SCO			-	0
2009	Škoda Fabia S2000	Julien Maurin	(France) Julien Maurin	MON	BRA	KEN	POR	BEL	RUS	POR; Ret	CZE	ESP; Ret	ITA; 16	SCO			-	0
2009	Škoda Fabia S2000	Evgeny Novikov	(Russia) Evgeny Novikov	MON	BRA	KEN	POR	BEL	RUS	POR	CZE; Ret	ESP	ITA	SCO			-	0
2009	Škoda Fabia S2000	Delimax Team	(Czech Republic) Pavel Valoušek	MON	BRA	KEN	POR	BEL	RUS	POR	CZE; 6	ESP	ITA	SCO			28th	3
2009	Škoda Fabia S2000	A.C. Principado de Asturias	(Spain) Alberto Hevia	MON	BRA	KEN	POR	BEL	RUS	POR	CZE	ESP; 8	ITA	SCO			28th	3
2009	Škoda Fabia S2000	Škoda Rally Team Italia	(Italy) Piero Longhi	MON	BRA	KEN	POR	BEL	RUS	POR	CZE	ESP	ITA; 9	SCO			-	0
2010	Škoda Fabia S2000	Jaroslav Orsák	(Czech Republic) Jaroslav Orsák	MON; 9	BRA	ARG	CAN	ITA	BEL	AZO	MAD	CZE	ITA	SCO	CYP		-	0
2010	Škoda Fabia S2000	Barwa Rally Team	(Qatar) Nasser Al-Attiyah	MON	BRA	ARG; Ret	CAN	ITA	BEL	AZO	MAD	CZE	ITA	SCO	CYP		10th*	10*
2010	Škoda Fabia S2000	Alberto Hevia	(Spain) Alberto Hevia	MON	BRA	ARG	CAN; 8	ITA	BEL	AZO	MAD	CZE	ITA	SCO	CYP		33rd	3
2010	Škoda Fabia S2000	Bernd Casier	(Belgium) Bernd Casier	MON	BRA	ARG	CAN	ITA	BEL; 4	AZO	MAD	CZE	ITA	SCO	CYP		17th	5
2010	Škoda Fabia S2000	BFO-Škoda Rally Team	(Belgium) Freddy Loix	MON	BRA	ARG	CAN	ITA	BEL; 1	AZO	MAD; 1	CZE; 1	ITA; 3	SCO	CYP		4th	3
2010	Škoda Fabia S2000	Škoda Delimax Czech National Team	(Czech Republic) Pavel Valoušek	MON	BRA	ARG	CAN	ITA	BEL	AZO	MAD	CZE; 3	ITA	SCO	CYP		14th	6
2010	Škoda Fabia S2000	Rufa Sport	(Czech Republic) Tomáš Kostka	MON	BRA	ARG	CAN	ITA	BEL	AZO	MAD	CZE; 9	ITA	SCO	CYP		-	0
2010	Škoda Fabia S2000	Mogul Racing Team	(Czech Republic) Roman Kresta	MON	BRA	ARG	CAN	ITA	BEL	AZO	MAD	CZE; Ret	ITA	SCO	CYP		29th*	3*
2010	Škoda Fabia S2000	Roger Feghali	(Lebanon) Roger Feghali	MON	BRA	ARG	CAN	ITA	BEL	AZO	MAD	CZE	ITA	SCO	CYP; 2		12th	8
2011	Škoda Fabia S2000	Alex Caffi	(Italy) Alex Caffi	MON; 11	CAN	FRA	UKR	BEL	AZO	CZE	HUN	ITA	SCO	CYP			-	0
2011	Škoda Fabia S2000	Škoda Auto Deutschland	(Germany) Mark Wallenwein	MON; 21	CAN	FRA	UKR	BEL	AZO	CZE; 18	HUN; 14	ITA	SCO	CYP; 8			21st	8
2011	Škoda Fabia S2000	Škoda Auto Deutschland	(Germany) Matthias Kahle	MON	CAN	FRA	UKR	BEL	AZO	CZE; 19	HUN; 20	ITA	SCO; 10	CYP; 8			14th	17.5
2011	Škoda Fabia S2000	TGS Worldwide OÜ	(Finland) Toni Gardemeister	MON	CAN; 12	FRA; 8	UKR; 7	BEL; 7	AZO	CZE; 6	HUN; 7	ITA; 9	SCO; 7	CYP			9th*	43*
2011	Škoda Fabia S2000	Škoda Sweden	(Sweden) Patrik Sandell	MON	CAN	FRA; 9	UKR; 9	BEL	AZO; 5	CZE; 12	HUN	ITA	SCO; Ret	CYP; 3			8th	44
2011	Škoda Fabia S2000	ME3 Rally Team	(Estonia) Karl Kruuda	MON	CAN	FRA	UKR; 8	BEL; 5	AZO	CZE; 10	HUN; 11	ITA; Ret	SCO; 13	CYP; 4			10th	39
2011	Škoda Fabia S2000	Hans Weijs, Jr.	(Netherlands) Hans Weijs, Jr.	MON	CAN	FRA	UKR	BEL; 2	AZO	CZE	HUN	ITA	SCO	CYP			13th	18
2011	Škoda Fabia S2000	Bernd Casier	(Belgium) Bernd Casier	MON	CAN	FRA	UKR	BEL; Ret	AZO	CZE	HUN	ITA	SCO	CYP			-	0
2011	Škoda Fabia S2000	Robert Barrable	(Republic of Ireland) Robert Barrable	MON	CAN	FRA	UKR	BEL; 10	AZO	ZLI; DSQ	HUN	ITA	SCO; 16	CYP			37th	2
2011	Škoda Fabia S2000	Jonathan Greer	(United Kingdom) Jonathan Greer	MON	CAN	FRA	UKR	BEL; Ret	AZO	ZLI	HUN	ITA	SCO; 11	CYP			-	0
2011	Škoda Fabia S2000	Adell Mogul Racing Team	(Czech Republic) Roman Kresta	MON	CAN	FRA	UKR	BEL	AZO	CZE; 8	HUN	ITA	SCO	CYP			32nd	4
2011	Škoda Fabia S2000	Rufa Sport	(Czech Republic) Tomáš Kostka	MON	CAN	FRA	UKR	BEL	AZO	CZE; Ret	HUN	ITA	SCO	CYP			-	0
2011	Škoda Fabia S2000	Red Bull Škoda	(Germany) Hermann Gassner	MON	CAN	FRA	UKR	BEL	AZO	CZE	HUN; 5	ITA	SCO	CYP			19th	10
2011	Škoda Fabia S2000	Škoda Rally Team Hungaria	(Hungary) Norbert Herzig	MON	CAN	FRA	UKR	BEL	AZO	CZE	HUN; Ret	ITA	SCO	CYP			-	0
2011	Škoda Fabia S2000	Burcu Çetinkaya	(Turkey) Burcu Çetinkaya	MON	CAN	FRA	UKR	BEL	AZO	CZE	HUN	ITA	SCO; Ret	CYP; 17			-	0
2012	Škoda Fabia S2000	Sepp Wiegand	(Germany) Sepp Wiegand	AZO; 4	CAN; 4	IRL; 7	COR; 8	TAR; 7	YPR	SMR; 4	ROM; Ret	ZLI; 10	YAL	SLI	SAN	CYP; 5	4th	73
2012	Škoda Fabia S2000	Red Bull Škoda	(Germany) Hermann Gassner	AZO; 5	CAN; Ret	IRL	COR; 9	TAR	YPR	SMR	ROM	ZLI	YAL	SLI	SAN	CYP	33rd	12
2012	Škoda Fabia S2000	Skydive Dubai Rally Team	(United Arab Emirates) Rashid Al-Ketbi	AZO; Ret	CAN; 8	IRL	COR; 22	TAR; 19	YPR; 15	SMR	ROM	ZLI	YAL	SLI	SAN	CYP	56th	4
2012	Škoda Fabia S2000	AMP Classic Team	(Spain) Alberto Hevia	AZO	CAN; Ret	IRL	COR	TAR	YPR	SMR	ROM	ZLI	YAL	SLI	SAN	CYP	-	0
2012	Škoda Fabia S2000	Eurosol Racing Team	(Hungary) János Puskadi	AZO	CAN; 7	IRL	COR	TAR	YPR	SMR; Ret	ROM	ZLI	YAL	SLI	SAN; 20	CYP	-	0
2012	Škoda Fabia S2000	Eurosol Racing Team	(Hungary) Lászlo Vizin	AZO	CAN	IRL	COR	TAR	YPR; 13	SMR	ROM	ZLI	YAL; 3	SLI	SAN	CYP; 8	17th	23
2012	Škoda Fabia S2000	Škoda Ireland	(Republic of Ireland) Robert Barrable	AZO	CAN	IRL; 6	COR	TAR	YPR; Ret	SMR	ROM	ZLI; 5	YAL	SLI	SAN	CYP	20th	18
2012	Škoda Fabia S2000	Škoda Motorsport Italia	(Italy) Umberto Scandola	AZO	CAN	IRL	COR	TAR; 4	YPR	SMR; 3	ROM	ZLI	YAL	SLI	SAN; Ret	CYP	12th	27
2012	Škoda Fabia S2000	Pieter Tsojen	(Belgium) Pieter Tsojen	AZO	CAN	IRL	COR	TAR	YPR; 3	SMR	ROM	ZLI	YAL	SLI	SAN	CYP	25th	15
2012	Škoda Fabia S2000	Jack Daniel's Rally Team	(Hungary) Gergely Szabó	AZO	CAN	IRL	COR	TAR	YPR	SMR	ROM; Ret	ZLI	YAL	SLI	SAN	CYP	-	0
2012	Škoda Fabia S2000	Škoda Romania	(Romania) Dan Girtofan	AZO	CAN	IRL	COR	TAR	YPR	SMR	ROM; Ret	ZLI	YAL	SLI	SAN	CYP	-	0
2012	Škoda Fabia S2000	Napoca Rally Academy	(Romania) Marco Tempestini	AZO	CAN	IRL	COR	TAR	YPR	SMR	ROM; Ret	ZLI	YAL	SLI	SAN	CYP	-	0
2012	Škoda Fabia S2000	Adell Mogul Racing Team	(Czech Republic) Roman Kresta	AZO	CAN	IRL	COR	TAR	YPR	SMR	ROM	ZLI; 2	YAL	SLI	SAN	CYP	20th	18
2012	Škoda Fabia S2000	Rufa Sport	(Czech Republic) Tomáš Kostka	AZO	CAN	IRL	COR	TAR	YPR	SMR	ROM	ZLI; 3	YAL	SLI	SAN	CYP	25th	15
2012	Škoda Fabia S2000	AK Rallysport Brno o.s.	(Czech Republic) Jaromír Tarabus	AZO	CAN	IRL	COR	TAR	YPR	SMR	ROM	ZLI; 4	YAL	SLI	SAN	CYP	33rd	12
2012	Škoda Fabia S2000	ME3 Rally Team	(Estonia) Karl Kruuda	AZO	CAN	IRL	COR	TAR	YPR	SMR	ROM	ZLI; 6	YAL	SLI	SAN	CYP	43rd	8
2012	Škoda Fabia S2000	Vivacom Rally Team	(Bulgaria) Dimitar Iliev	AZO	CAN	IRL	COR	TAR	YPR	SMR	ROM	ZLI	YAL	SLI; 1	SAN	CYP	15th	25

* Including points scored with different cars.

== IRC Victories ==
No.	Event	Season	Driver	Co-driver
1	2009 Rally Russia	2009	(Finland) Juho Hänninen	(Finland) Mikko Markkula
2	(Czech Republic) 39. Barum Czech Rally Zlín 2009	2009	(Czech Republic) Jan Kopecký	(Czech Republic) Petr Starý
3	(Spain) 46. Rallye Príncipe de Asturias 2009	2009	(Czech Republic) Jan Kopecký	(Czech Republic) Petr Starý
4	RAC MSA Rally of Scotland 2009	2009	(United Kingdom) Guy Wilks	(United Kingdom) Phil Pugh
5	30. Rally Argentina 2010	2010	(Finland) Juho Hänninen	(Finland) Mikko Markkula
6	(Spain) 34. Rally Islas Canarias - El Corte Inglés 2010	2010	(Czech Republic) Jan Kopecký	(Czech Republic) Petr Starý
7	(Italy) Rally d'Italia Sardinia 2010	2010	(Finland) Juho Hänninen	(Finland) Mikko Markkula
8	46. Belgium Geko Ypres Rally 2010	2010	(Belgium) Freddy Loix	(Belgium) Frederic Miclotte
9	(Portugal) 51. Rali Vinho da Madeira 2010	2010	(Belgium) Freddy Loix	(Belgium) Frederic Miclotte
10	(Czech Republic) 40. Barum Czech Rally Zlín 2010	2010	(Belgium) Freddy Loix	(Belgium) Frederic Miclotte
11	RAC MSA Rally of Scotland 2010	2010	(Finland) Juho Hänninen	(Finland) Mikko Markkula
12	(Spain) 35. Rally Islas Canarias - El Corte Inglés 2011	2011	(Finland) Juho Hänninen	(Finland) Mikko Markkula
13	(Ukraine) 2011 Prime Yalta Rally	2011	(Finland) Juho Hänninen	(Finland) Mikko Markkula
14	47. Belgium Geko Ypres Rally 2011	2011	(Belgium) Freddy Loix	(Belgium) Frederic Miclotte
15	(Portugal) 46º Sata Rallye Açores	2011	(Finland) Juho Hänninen	(Finland) Mikko Markkula
16	(Czech Republic) 41. Barum Czech Rally Zlín 2011	2011	(Czech Republic) Jan Kopecký	(Czech Republic) Petr Starý
17	(Hungary) 45. Canon Mecsek Rallye 2011	2011	(Czech Republic) Jan Kopecký	(Czech Republic) Petr Starý
18	RACMSA Rally of Scotland 2011	2011	(Norway) Andreas Mikkelsen	(Norway) Ola Fløene
19	39th FxPro Cyprus Rally	2011	(Norway) Andreas Mikkelsen	(Norway) Ola Fløene
20	(Portugal) 47º Sata Rallye Açores	2012	(Norway) Andreas Mikkelsen	(Norway) Ola Fløene
21	(Spain) 36. Rally Islas Canarias Trofeo El Corte Inglés	2012	(Czech Republic) Jan Kopecký	(Czech Republic) Petr Starý
22	(Republic of Ireland) Circuit of Ireland 2012	2012	(Finland) Juho Hänninen	(Finland) Mikko Markkula
23	(Italy) 96. Rally Targa Florio 2012	2012	(Czech Republic) Jan Kopecký	(Czech Republic) Petr Starý
24	48. Belgium Geko Ypres Rally 2012	2012	(Finland) Juho Hänninen	(Finland) Mikko Markkula
25	Sibiului Rally Romania 2012	2012	(Norway) Andreas Mikkelsen	(Norway) Ola Fløene
26	(Czech Republic) 42. Barum Czech Rally Zlín 2012	2012	(Finland) Juho Hänninen	(Finland) Mikko Markkula
27	(Bulgaria) 32. Mabanol Rally Sliven 2012	2012	(Bulgaria) Dimitar Iliev	(Bulgaria) Yanaki Yanakiev
