= List of Intercontinental Rally Challenge rallies =

The list of Intercontinental Rally Challenge rallies includes all rally competitions that have been part of the Intercontinental Rally Challenge (IRC) schedule.

Note: bold text indicates 2012 rallies.

Location	Rally	Headquarters	Rally surface	IRC years
Argentina	Rally Argentina	Córdoba	Gravel	2010
Belgium	**Belgium Ypres Westhoek Rally**	Ypres	Asphalt	2006–2012
Brazil	Rallye Internacional de Curitiba	Curitiba	Gravel	2009–2010
Bulgaria	**Rally Sliven**	Sliven	Asphalt	2012
China	China Rally	Guangdong	Gravel	2007–2008
Cyprus	**Cyprus Rally**	Limassol	Asphalt/gravel	2010–2012
Czech Republic	**Barum Rally Zlín**	Zlín	Asphalt	2007–2012
France	**Tour de Corse**	Ajaccio	Asphalt	2011–2012
(United Kingdom) Great Britain	Rally Scotland	Perth	Gravel	2009–2011
Hungary	Mecsek Rallye	Pécs	Asphalt	2011
(Republic of Ireland) / (United Kingdom) Ireland/Northern Ireland	**Circuit of Ireland Rally**	Armagh	Asphalt	2012
Italy	**Rallye Sanremo**	Sanremo	Asphalt	2006–2012
Italy	Rally d'Italia Sardegna	Olbia	Gravel	2010
Italy	**Rally Targa Florio**	Palermo	Asphalt	2012
Kenya	Safari Rally	Nairobi	Gravel	2007, 2009
Monaco/ France	Monte Carlo Rally	Monte Carlo/Valence	Asphalt with ice/snow	2009–2011
Portugal	**Sata Rallye Açores**	Ponta Delgada	Gravel	2009–2012
Portugal	Rali Vinho da Madeira	Funchal	Asphalt	2006–2010
Portugal	Rally de Portugal	Vilamoura	Gravel	2008
Romania	**Sibiu Rally Romania**	Sibiu	Gravel	2012
Russia	Rally Russia	Vyborg	Gravel	2007–2009
San Marino	**Rally San Marino**	TBA	Gravel	2012
South Africa	Zulu Rally South Africa	Durban	Gravel	2006
Spain	**Rally Islas Canarias Trofeo El Corte Inglés**	Las Palmas	Asphalt	2010–2012
Spain	Rally Príncipe de Asturias	Oviedo	Asphalt	2008–2009
Switzerland	Rallye International du Valais	Valais	Asphalt	2007–2008
Turkey	Rally of Turkey	Antalya	Gravel	2007
Turkey	Istanbul Rally	Istanbul	Gravel	2008
Ukraine	**Prime Yalta Rally**	Yalta	Asphalt	2011–2012

== By seasons ==
Rnd	2007	2008	2009	2010	2011	2012
1	(Kenya) Safari	(Turkey) Istanbul	(Monaco) Monte Carlo	(Monaco) Monte Carlo	(Monaco) Monte Carlo	(Portugal) Açores
2	Turkey	Portugal	(Brazil) Curitiba	(Brazil) Curitiba	(Spain) Canary Islands	(Spain) Canary Islands
3	(Belgium) Ypres	(Belgium) Ypres	(Kenya) Safari	Argentina	(France) Corsica	(Republic of Ireland) Ireland
4	Russia	Russia	(Portugal) Açores	(Spain) Canary Islands	(Ukraine) Yalta	(France) Corsica
5	(Portugal) Madeira	(Portugal) Madeira	(Belgium) Ypres	Italy	(Belgium) Ypres	(Italy) Targa Florio
6	(Czech Republic) Zlín	(Czech Republic) Zlín	Russia	(Belgium) Ypres	(Portugal) Açores	(Belgium) Ypres
7	(Italy) San Remo	(Spain) Asturias	(Portugal) Madeira	(Portugal) Açores	(Czech Republic) Zlín	San Marino
8	(Switzerland) Valais	(Italy) San Remo	(Czech Republic) Zlín	(Portugal) Madeira	(Hungary) Mecsek	Romania
9	China	(Switzerland) Valais	(Spain) Asturias	(Czech Republic) Zlín	(Italy) San Remo	(Czech Republic) Zlín
10		China	(Italy) San Remo	(Italy) San Remo	(United Kingdom) Scotland	(Ukraine) Yalta
11			(United Kingdom) Scotland	(United Kingdom) Scotland	Cyprus	(Bulgaria) Sliven
12				Cyprus		(Italy) San Remo
13						Cyprus
