= Robert Barrable =

Irish rally driver (born 1987)

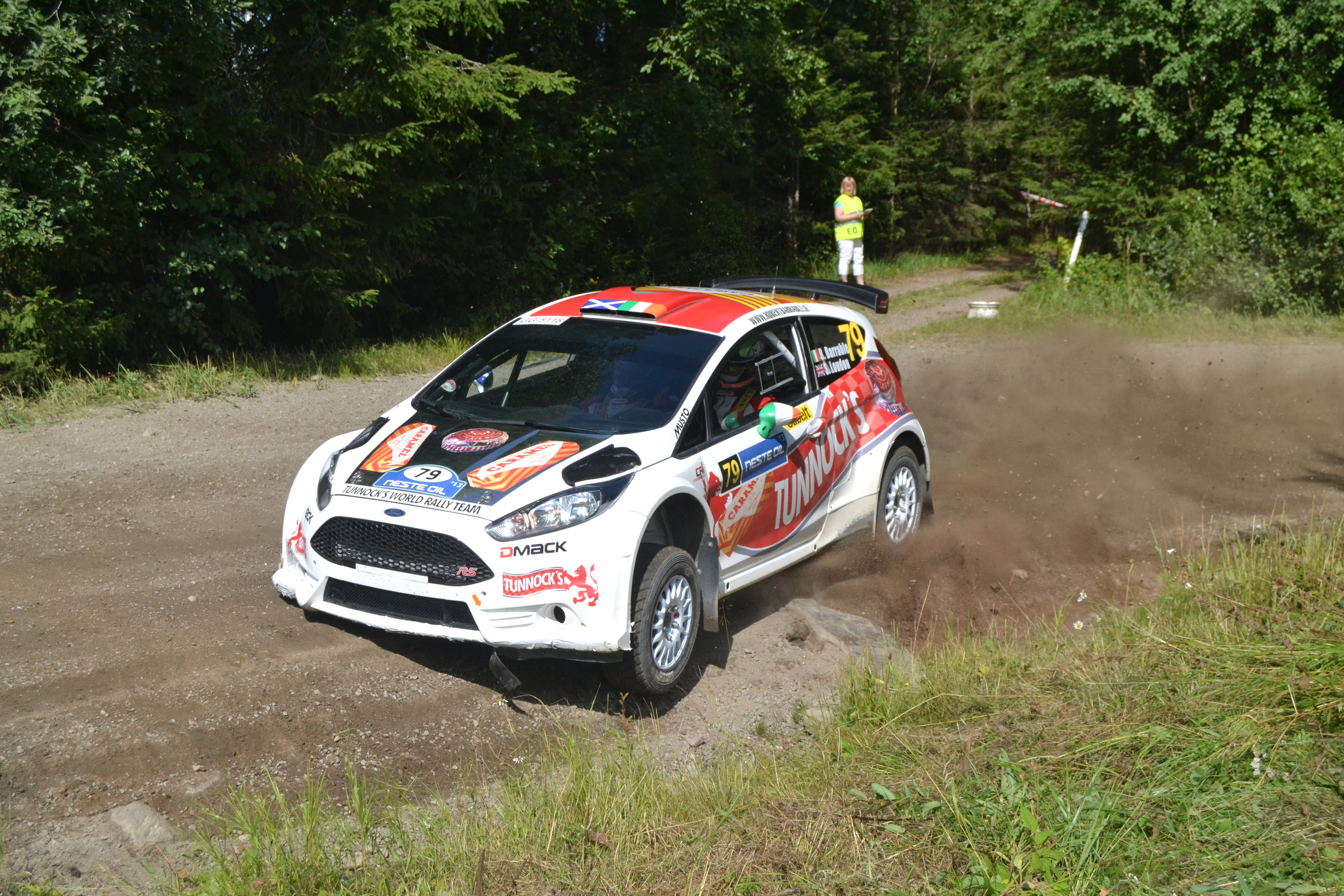
- Barrable at 2013 Rally Finland

Personal information
- Nationality: Irish
- Born: September 1, 1987 (age 39)

World Rally Championship record
- Years active: 2013–2014
- Co-driver: (United Kingdom) Stuart Loudon
- Rallies: 9
- Championships: 0
- Rally wins: 0
- Podiums: 0
- Stage wins: 0
- Total points: 0
- First rally: 2013 Rally de Portugal
- Last rally: 2014 Rally Catalunya

Robert Barrable (born 1 September 1987) is an Irish rally driver. He is racing in the WRC-2 since the 2013 season. He has also raced in the Intercontinental Rally Challenge and the European Rally Championship.

== Career results ==
=== WRC results ===
Year	Entrant	Car	1	2	3	4	5	6	7	8	9	10	11	12	13	Pos.	Points
2013	CA1 Sport Ltd	Ford Fiesta S2000	MON	SWE	MEX	POR; 11	ARG	GRE	ITA							NC	0
2013	CA1 Sport Ltd	Ford Fiesta R5								FIN; 18	GER; Ret	AUS	FRA; 26	ESP; 15	GBR; 21	NC	0
2014	CA1 Sport Ltd	Ford Fiesta R5	MON; 13	SWE	MEX	POR; 16	ARG	ITA	POL	FIN	GER	AUS	FRA	ESP; 16	GBR	NC	0

==== WRC 2 results ====
Year	Entrant	Car	1	2	3	4	5	6	7	8	9	10	11	12	13	Pos.	Points
2013	CA1 Sport Ltd	Ford Fiesta S2000	MON	SWE	MEX	POR; 2	ARG	GRE	ITA							9th	35
2013	CA1 Sport Ltd	Ford Fiesta R5								FIN; 7	GER; Ret	AUS	FRA; 4	ESP; 3	GBR; 9	9th	35
2014	CA1 Sport Ltd	Ford Fiesta R5	MON; 3	SWE	MEX	POR; 6	ARG	ITA	POL	FIN	GER	AUS	FRA	ESP; 3	GBR	12th	38

=== IRC results ===
Year	Entrant	Car	1	2	3	4	5	6	7	8	9	10	11	12	13	Pos.	Points
2011	(Republic of Ireland) Robert Barrable	Škoda Fabia S2000	MON	CAN	COR	YAL	YPR; 9	AZO	ZLI; DSQ	MEC	SAN	SCO; 16	CYP			37th	2
2012	(Republic of Ireland) Robert Barrable	Škoda Fabia S2000	AZO	CAN	IRL; 6	COR	ITA	YPR; Ret	SMR	ROM	ZLI; 5	YAL	SLI	SAN	CYP	20th	18

=== ERC results ===
Year	Car	Entrant	1	2	3	4	5	6	7	8	9	10	11	Pos.	Points
2012	(Republic of Ireland) Robert Barrable	Škoda Fabia S2000	JÄN	MIL	CRO	BUL	YPR; Ret	BOS	MAD	ZLI; 5	AST	POL	VAL	NC	0

=== Complete British GT Championship results ===
(key) (Races in bold indicate pole position) (Races in italics indicate fastest lap)

Year	Team	Car	Class	1	2	3	4	5	6	7	8	9	DC	Points
2016	RCIB Insurance Racing	Ginetta G55 GT4	GT4	BRH; 1 Ret	ROC; 1 Ret	OUL; 1; 22	OUL; 2; 15	SIL; 1; 11	SPA; 1; 19	SNE; 1; 19	SNE; 2 Ret	DON; 1; 15	9th	81.5
