= 2010 Rally Scotland =

Motor rally competition

Round 11 of the 2010 Intercontinental Rally Challenge season
← Previous event	Next event →
- Rally Scotland Logo
- Host country: United Kingdom
- Rally base: Perth and Stirling
- Dates run: 15 – 17 October 2010
- Stages: 12 (208.08 km; 129.29 miles)
- Stage surface: Gravel
- Overall distance: 838.29 km (520.89 miles)

Statistics
- Crews: 21 at start, 10 at finish

Overall results
- Overall winner: (Finland) Juho Hänninen (Czech Republic) Škoda Motorsport

The 2010 Rally Scotland was the 11th round of the 2010 Intercontinental Rally Challenge and the second running of the event. The event was held between 15 – 17 October 2010 in the forests of Stirling and Perth & Kinross. Four of the special stages were broadcast live on Eurosport.

== Introduction ==
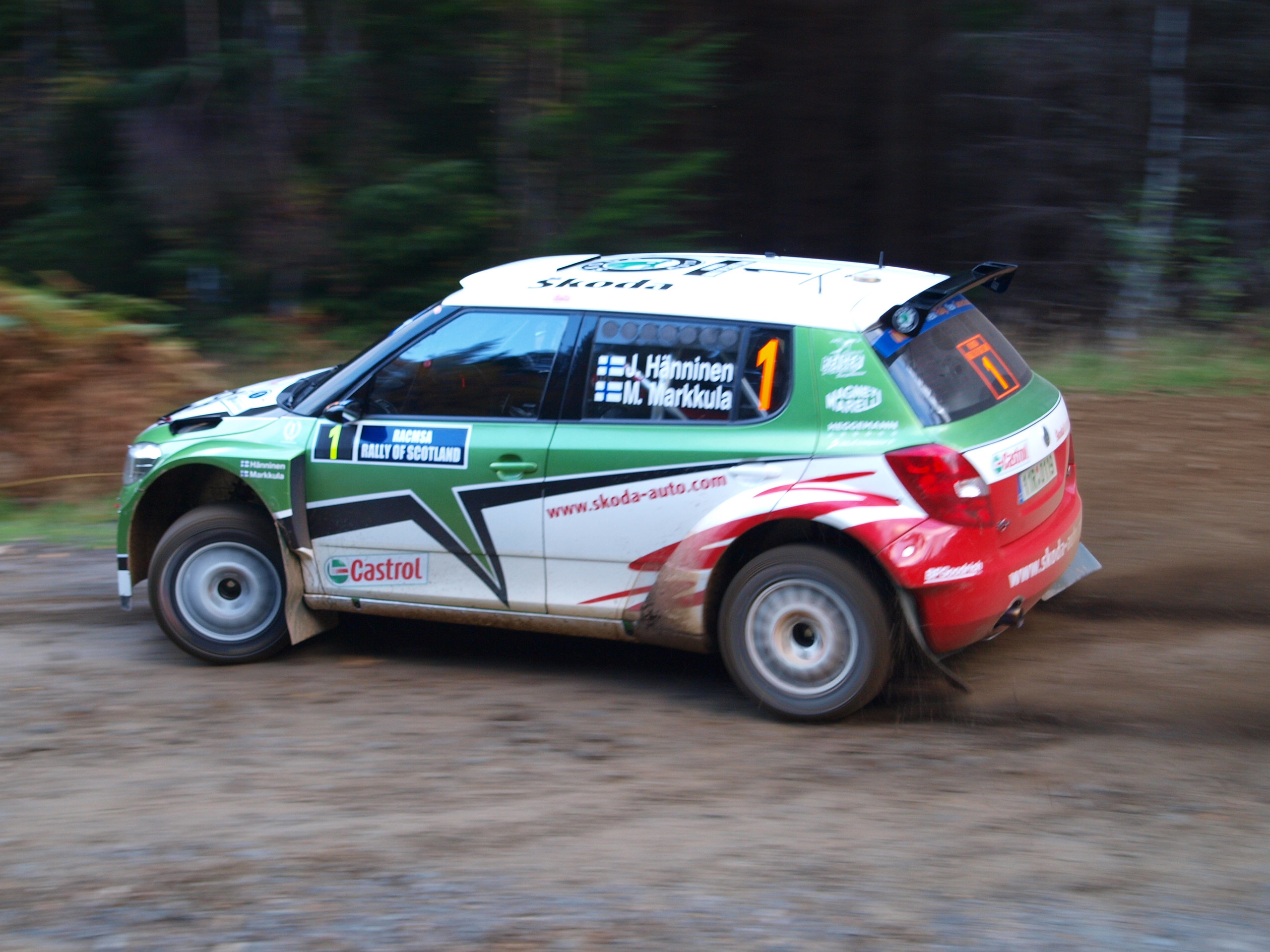
Juho Hänninen on SS4 (Drummond Hill) on his way to victory in the rally.

The forest rally was based in Perth, with a ceremonial start and the initial two stages being held at Scone Palace in the dark on the Friday evening. Saturday consisted of three routes (each run twice) covering 114.10 km (70.90 mi). Sunday had an additional two routes (93.98 km (58.40 mi)) again run twice, before the ceremonial finish at Stirling Castle.

Thierry Neuville made his debut on the rally which was described by his Kronos Racing team mate Kris Meeke as the best in the world.

By starting the event, Juho Hänninen became IRC champion after Škoda Motorsport elected not to send Jan Kopecký to the event.

== Results ==
Juho Hänninen cemented his championship title with victory on a rally of attrition with just ten of the 21 starters finishing the rally.

=== Overall ===
Pos.	Driver	Co-driver	Car	Time	Difference	Points
1.	(Finland) Juho Hänninen	(Finland) Mikko Markkula	Škoda Fabia S2000	2:01:07.4	0.0	10
2.	(Norway) Andreas Mikkelsen	(Norway) Ola Fløene	Ford Fiesta S2000	2:01:32.9	25.5	8
3.	(United Kingdom) Kris Meeke	(Republic of Ireland) Paul Nagle	Peugeot 207 S2000	2:04:31.6	3:24.2	6
4.	(United Kingdom) David Bogie	(United Kingdom) Kevin Rae	Mitsubishi Lancer Evolution IX	2:13:08.7	12:01.3	5
5. (6.)	(Estonia) Siim Plangi	(Estonia) Marek Sarapuu	Honda Civic Type R3	2:15:46.4	14:39.0	4
6. (7.)	(Republic of Ireland) Eamonn Boland	(Republic of Ireland) Mick Morrissey	Mitsubishi Lancer Evolution X	2:17:46.2	16:38.8	3
7. (8.)	(Turkey) Burcu Çetinkaya	(Turkey) Ciçek Guney	Peugeot 207 S2000	2:18:03.5	16:56.1	2
8. (9.)	(United Kingdom) Harry Hunt	(United Kingdom) Sebastian Marshall	Ford Fiesta R2	2:22:46.9	21:39.5	1

=== Special stages ===
Day	Stage	Time	Name	Length	Winner	Time	Avg. spd.	Rally leader
1 (15–16 Oct)	SS1	20:11	Scone Palace 1	3.37 km	(United Kingdom) Guy Wilks	2:08.5	94.41 km/h	(United Kingdom) Guy Wilks
1 (15–16 Oct)	SS2	20:30	Scone Palace 2	3.37 km	(United Kingdom) Guy Wilks (United Kingdom) Kris Meeke	2:07.5	95.15 km/h	(United Kingdom) Guy Wilks
1 (15–16 Oct)	SS3	07:20	Craigvinean 1	17.34 km	(United Kingdom) Kris Meeke	10:32.5	98.69 km/h	(United Kingdom) Kris Meeke
1 (15–16 Oct)	SS4	08:45	Drummond Hill 1	15.08 km	(Finland) Juho Hänninen	8:42.5	103.90 km/h	(United Kingdom) Kris Meeke
1 (15–16 Oct)	SS5	10:10	Errochty 1	17.68 km	(Finland) Juho Hänninen	9:57.8	106.47 km/h	(United Kingdom) Guy Wilks
1 (15–16 Oct)	SS6	13:50	Craigvinean 2	17.34 km	(Finland) Juho Hänninen	10:26.2	99.69 km/h	(Finland) Juho Hänninen
1 (15–16 Oct)	SS7	15:15	Drummond Hill 2	15.08 km	(Finland) Juho Hänninen	8:40.0	104.40 km/h	(Finland) Juho Hänninen
1 (15–16 Oct)	SS8	16:40	Errochty 2	17.68 km	(Norway) Andreas Mikkelsen	9:55.5	106.88 km/h	(Finland) Juho Hänninen
2 (17 Oct)	SS9	08:40	Clashmore 1	15.95 km	(United Kingdom) Guy Wilks	10:04.1	95.05 km/h	(Finland) Juho Hänninen
2 (17 Oct)	SS10	10:10	Loch Ard 1	29.04 km	(United Kingdom) Guy Wilks	18:47.8	92.70 km/h	(Finland) Juho Hänninen
2 (17 Oct)	SS11	11:40	Clashmore 2	15.95 km	(Finland) Juho Hänninen	10:08.3	94.39 km/h	(Finland) Juho Hänninen
2 (17 Oct)	SS12	13:10	Loch Ard 2	29.04 km	(United Kingdom) Guy Wilks	18:43.9	93.02 km/h	(Finland) Juho Hänninen
