= 2009 Barum Czech Rally Zlín =

Round 8 of the 2009 Intercontinental Rally Challenge season
← Previous event	Next event →
- Host country: Czech Republic
- Rally base: Zlín
- Dates run: August 21 - – 23 2009
- Stages: 15 (254.96 km; 158.42 miles)
- Stage surface: Asphalt

Statistics
- Crews: 106 at start, 55 at finish

Overall results
- Overall winner: Jan Kopecký/Petr Starý; Škoda Motorsport

The 2009 Barum Czech Rally Zlín was 8th round of 2009 Intercontinental Rally Challenge season, it was won by local driver Jan Kopecký with Škoda Fabia S2000.

== Results ==
Pos.	Driver	Co-driver	Car	Time	Difference	Points
1.	(Czech Republic) Jan Kopecký	(Czech Republic) Petr Starý	Škoda Fabia S2000	2:24:21,1	0.0	10
2.	(United Kingdom) Kris Meeke	(Republic of Ireland) Paul Nagle	Peugeot 207 S2000	2:25:21,5	1:00,4	8
3.	(Finland) Juho Hänninen	(Finland) Mikko Markkula	Škoda Fabia S2000	2:26:21,9	2:00,8	6
4.	(Czech Republic) Roman Kresta	(Czech Republic) Petr Gross	Peugeot 207 S2000	2:26:31,9	2:10,8	5
5.	(Czech Republic) Martin Prokop	(Czech Republic) Jan Tománek	Peugeot 207 S2000	2:27:00,7	2:39,6	4
6.	(Czech Republic) Pavel Valoušek	(Czech Republic) Zdeněk Hrůza	Škoda Fabia S2000	2:29:11,5	4:50,4	3
7.	(Hungary) János Tóth	(Hungary) Robert Tagai	Peugeot 207 S2000	2:29:40,8	5:19,7	2
8.	(Czech Republic) Václav Pech	(Czech Republic) Petr Uhel	Mitsubishi Lancer Evo IX	2:29:44,3	5:23,2	1

== Special stages ==
Day	Stage	Time	Name	Length	Winner	Time	Avg. spd.	Rally leader
1 (21 Aug)	SS1	21:00	SSS Zlín	9.36 km	(Finland) Juho Hänninen	1:09.6	78.6 km/h	(Finland) Juho Hänninen
1 (22 Aug)	SS2	8:53	Pindula 1	19.13 km	(Czech Republic) Jan Kopecký	9:58.4	115.1 km/h	(Czech Republic) Jan Kopecký
1 (22 Aug)	SS3	9:56	Halenkovice 1	17.39 km	(Czech Republic) Jan Kopecký	9:16,7	112.5 km/h	(Czech Republic) Jan Kopecký
1 (22 Aug)	SS4	10:44	Kudlovice 1	22.47 km	(United Kingdom) Kris Meeke	12:19,3	109.4 km/h	(Czech Republic) Jan Kopecký
1 (22 Aug)	SS5	12:42	Pindula 2	19.13 km	(Czech Republic) Jan Kopecký	9:55,0	115.7 km/h	(Czech Republic) Jan Kopecký
1 (22 Aug)	SS6	13:20	Zádveřice 1	14.82 km	(Czech Republic) Jan Kopecký	7:46,9	114.3 km/h	(Czech Republic) Jan Kopecký
1 (22 Aug)	SS7	15:28	Halenkovice 2	17.39 km	(Finland) Juho Hänninen	9:20,4	111.7 km/h	(Czech Republic) Jan Kopecký
1 (22 Aug)	SS8	16:16	Kudlovice 2	22.47 km	(Belgium) Freddy Loix/ (Czech Republic) Jan Kopecký	13:11,8	102.2 km/h	(Czech Republic) Jan Kopecký
1 (22 Aug)	SS9	17:34	Zádveřice 2	14.82 km	(Czech Republic) Jan Kopecký	8:20,6	106.6 km/h	(Czech Republic) Jan Kopecký
2 (23 Aug)	SS10	8:48	Troják 1	28.81 km	(United Kingdom) Kris Meeke	16:45,3	103.2 km/h	(Czech Republic) Jan Kopecký
2 (23 Aug)	SS11	9:31	Semetín 1	11.71 km	(Czech Republic) Jan Kopecký	7:05,1	99.2 km/h	(Czech Republic) Jan Kopecký
2 (23 Aug)	SS12	10:54	Komárov 1	8.47 km	(United Kingdom) Kris Meeke	4:49,6	105.3 km/h	(Czech Republic) Jan Kopecký
2 (23 Aug)	SS13	12:47	Troják 2	28.81 km	(United Kingdom) Kris Meeke	4:49,6	106.1 km/h	(Czech Republic) Jan Kopecký
2 (23 Aug)	SS14	13:30	Semetín 2	11.71 km	(Finland) Juho Hänninen	6:46,3	103.8 km/h	(Czech Republic) Jan Kopecký
2 (23 Aug)	SS15	14:53	Komárov 2	18.47 km	(Finland) Juho Hänninen	4:47,3	106.1 km/h	(Czech Republic) Jan Kopecký
