= 2012 Barum Czech Rally Zlín =

Round 9 of the 2012 Intercontinental Rally Challenge season
← Previous event	Next event →
- Host country: Czech Republic
- Rally base: Zlín
- Dates run: 31 August 2012 – 2 September 2012
- Stages: 15 (251.62 km; 156.35 miles)
- Stage surface: Asphalt

Statistics
- Crews: 99 at start, 64 at finish

Overall results
- Overall winner: (Finland) Juho Hänninen (Czech Republic) Škoda Motorsport

The 2012 Barum Czech Rally Zlín was the ninth round of the 2012 Intercontinental Rally Challenge (IRC) season, and also a round of the European Rally Championship. The fifteen stage asphalt rally took place over 31 August - 2 September 2012. Other than the opening stage on Friday night, all stages were run in daylight.

== Results ==
Juho Hänninen took his third win in the 2012 Intercontinental Rally Challenge season.

=== Overall ===
Pos.	Driver	Co-driver	Car	Time	Difference	Points
1.	(Finland) Juho Hänninen	(Finland) Mikko Markkula	Škoda Fabia S2000	2:11:28.2	-	25
2.	(Czech Republic) Roman Kresta	(Czech Republic) Petr Gross	Škoda Fabia S2000	2:13:11.3	1:43.1	18
3.	(Czech Republic) Tomáš Kostka	(Czech Republic) Miroslav Houšť	Škoda Fabia S2000	2:13:20.0	1:51.8	15
4.	(Czech Republic) Jaromír Tarabus	(Czech Republic) Daniel Trunkát	Škoda Fabia S2000	2:15:39.9	4:11.7	12
5.	(Republic of Ireland) Robert Barrable	(United Kingdom) Stuart Loudon	Škoda Fabia S2000	2:16:01.8	4:33.6	10
6.	(Estonia) Karl Kruuda	(Estonia) Martin Järveoja	Škoda Fabia S2000	2:16:31.1	5:03.0	8
7.	(Austria) Andreas Aigner	(Austria) Ilka Minor-Petrasko	Subaru Impreza STi R4	2:17:02.8	5:34.6	6
8.	(Norway) Andreas Mikkelsen	(Norway) Ola Floene	Škoda Fabia S2000	2:17:04.0	5:35.8	4
9.	(Poland) Michal Solowow	(Poland) Maciej Baran	Peugeot 207 S2000	2:17:46.9	6:18.7	2
10.	(Germany) Sepp Wiegand	(Germany) Timo Gottschalk	Škoda Fabia S2000	2:17:46.9	6:18.7	1

=== Special stages ===
Day	Stage	Time	Name	Length	Winner	Time	Avg. spd.	Rally leader
Leg 1 (31 August - 1 September)	SS1	21:15	SSS Zlín	9.36 km	(Czech Republic) Tomáš Kostka	7:40.0	73.3 km/h	(Czech Republic) Tomáš Kostka
Leg 1 (31 August - 1 September)	SS2	10:10	Slušovice 1	15.94 km	(Finland) Juho Hänninen	10:41.2	89.5 km/h	(Finland) Juho Hänninen
Leg 1 (31 August - 1 September)	SS3	10:43	Pindula 1	18.43 km	(Norway) Andreas Mikkelsen	9:52.5	112.2 km/h	(Finland) Juho Hänninen
Leg 1 (31 August - 1 September)	SS4	13:10	Slušovice 2	15.94 km	(Norway) Andreas Mikkelsen	10:41.8	89.4 km/h	(Norway) Andreas Mikkelsen
Leg 1 (31 August - 1 September)	SS5	13:43	Pindula 2	18.43 km	(Czech Republic) Jan Kopecký	10:02.4	110.1 km/h	(Norway) Andreas Mikkelsen
Leg 1 (31 August - 1 September)	SS6	14:41	Lukov 1	11.38 km	(Norway) Andreas Mikkelsen	6:51.8	99.5 km/h	(Norway) Andreas Mikkelsen
Leg 1 (31 August - 1 September)	SS7	15:14	Tesák 1	19.18 km	(Czech Republic) Jan Kopecký	10:01.9	114.7 km/h	(Finland) Juho Hänninen
Leg 1 (31 August - 1 September)	SS8	18:07	Lukov 2	11.38 km	(Finland) Juho Hänninen	6:40.0	102.4 km/h	(Finland) Juho Hänninen
Leg 1 (31 August - 1 September)	SS9	18:07	Tesák 2	19.18 km	(Finland) Juho Hänninen	9:50.3	117.0 km/h	(Finland) Juho Hänninen
Leg 2 (2 September)	SS10	08:57	Halenkovice 1	21.40 km	(Czech Republic) Jan Kopecký	11:25.9	112.3 km/h	(Finland) Juho Hänninen
Leg 2 (2 September)	SS11	09:34	Kudlovice 1	11.42 km	(Finland) Juho Hänninen	6:28.7	105.8 km/h	(Finland) Juho Hänninen
Leg 2 (2 September)	SS12	10:10	Maják 1	23.38 km	(Finland) Juho Hänninen	12:49.0	109.5 km/h	(Finland) Juho Hänninen
Leg 2 (2 September)	SS13	11:57	Halenkovice 2	21.40 km	(Finland) Juho Hänninen	11:33.3	111.1 km/h	(Finland) Juho Hänninen
Leg 2 (2 September)	SS14	12:34	Kudlovice 2	11.42 km	(Norway) Andreas Mikkelsen	6:02.8	113.3 km/h	(Finland) Juho Hänninen
Leg 2 (2 September)	~~SS14~~	~~13:10~~	~~Maják 2~~	~~11.42 km~~	cancelled*			(Finland) Juho Hänninen

- Event has been finished after accident on SS13. Car #32 crashed and one spectator died.
