= 2010 Rally International of Curitiba =

Motor rally competition

2010 Rally International of Curitiba 2010 Rally Internacional de Curitiba
Round 2 of the 2010 Intercontinental Rally Challenge season
← Previous event	Next event →
- Rally Curitiba Logo
- Host country: Brazil
- Rally base: Curitiba
- Dates run: March 4 – 6 2010
- Stages: 15 (684.20 km; 425.14 miles)
- Stage surface: Gravel

Statistics
- Crews: 49 at start, 28 at finish

Overall results
- Overall winner: (United Kingdom) Kris Meeke (United Kingdom) Peugeot UK

The 2010 Rally International of Curitiba, officially 2010 Rally Internacional de Curitiba (30° Graciosa Rally), was the second round of the 2010 Intercontinental Rally Challenge (IRC) season. It was also the first round of the South American Rally Championship and the Brazilian Rally Championship. The rally took place over 4–6 March 2010.

== Introduction ==
The rally was due to start with a 3.38 km (2.10 mi) prologue on Thursday 4 March to determine the running order for leg one. However, this was cancelled due to heavy rain. The prologue route was also due to be used as the final stage of the rally, but was also cancelled due to the persistent rain that lasted throughout the event. The event consisted of a total of 15 gravel special stages covering 684.20 km (425.14 mi) with all stages taking place in daylight. The rally was centred in the city of Curitiba, which is the capital of the Brazilian state of Paraná.

Confirmed entries for the event included Guy Wilks (Škoda UK), reigning champion Kris Meeke (Kronos Racing Team Peugeot UK), and the Brazilian Daniel Oliveira, who drove a Peugeot 207 S2000 for the Austrian Stohl Racing squad.

== Results ==
Kris Meeke led the rally from start to finish, as he took his first victory of the season. Another British driver, Guy Wilks finished 46.7 seconds behind in second, with the Škoda of Juho Hänninen finishing third. Hänninen moves into the championship lead, after his six points in Brazil took him onto a tally of fourteen points.

=== Overall ===
Pos.	Driver	Co-driver	Car	Time	Difference	Points
1.	(United Kingdom) Kris Meeke	(Republic of Ireland) Paul Nagle	Peugeot 207 S2000	1:42:45.4	0.0	10
2.	(United Kingdom) Guy Wilks	(United Kingdom) Phil Pugh	Škoda Fabia S2000	1:43:32.1	46.7	8
3.	(Finland) Juho Hänninen	(Finland) Mikko Markkula	Škoda Fabia S2000	1:44:05.6	1:20.2	6
4.	(Czech Republic) Jan Kopecký	(Czech Republic) Petr Starý	Škoda Fabia S2000	1:44:34.7	1:49.3	5
5.	(Portugal) Bruno Magalhães	(Portugal) Carlos Magalhães	Peugeot 207 S2000	1:46:50.9	4:05.5	4
6.	(Brazil) Eduardo Scheer	(Brazil) Geferson Pavinatto	Mitsubishi Lancer Evolution IX	1:56:45.8	14:00.4	3
7.	(Brazil) Daniel Rolim Oliveira	(France) Denis Giraudet	Peugeot 207 S2000	1:57:27.2	14:41.8	2
8. (11.)	(Brazil) Marcos Tokarski	(Brazil) Laércio Reginatto	Peugeot 207	2:06:06.8	23:21.4	1

=== Special stages ===
Day	Stage	Time	Name	Length	Winner	Time	Avg. spd.	Rally leader
Prologue (4 Mar)	SSS	15:30	Pinhais	3.38 km	stage cancelled*			
Leg 1 (5 Mar)	SS1	08:55	Campo Magro 1	18.85 km	(United Kingdom) Kris Meeke	10:17.0	109.98 km/h	(United Kingdom) Kris Meeke
Leg 1 (5 Mar)	SS2	10:05	Ouro Fino 1	9.58 km	(United Kingdom) Kris Meeke	4:42.0	122.30 km/h	(United Kingdom) Kris Meeke
Leg 1 (5 Mar)	SS3	10:45	Curitiba 1	10.91 km	(United Kingdom) Kris Meeke	4:51.6	134.69 km/h	(United Kingdom) Kris Meeke
Leg 1 (5 Mar)	SS4	11:10	Campo Magro 2	18.85 km	(United Kingdom) Kris Meeke	10:05.5	112.07 km/h	(United Kingdom) Kris Meeke
Leg 1 (5 Mar)	SS5	14:50	Curitiba 2	10.58 km	(Finland) Juho Hänninen	4:43.3	134.44 km/h	(United Kingdom) Kris Meeke
Leg 1 (5 Mar)	SS6	15:15	Campo Magro 3	18.85 km	(United Kingdom) Kris Meeke	9:58.3	113.42 km/h	(United Kingdom) Kris Meeke
Leg 1 (5 Mar)	SS7	15:45	Ouro Fino 2	9.58 km	(United Kingdom) Kris Meeke	4:38.4	123.88 km/h	(United Kingdom) Kris Meeke
Leg 2 (6 Mar)	SS8	08:30	Bocaiúva	28.32 km	(Finland) Juho Hänninen	17:49.8	95.30 km/h	(United Kingdom) Kris Meeke
Leg 2 (6 Mar)	SS9	09:30	Rio Pesqueiro 1	15.06 km	stage cancelled			(United Kingdom) Kris Meeke
Leg 2 (6 Mar)	SS10	10:10	Quattro Barras 1	12.02 km	(Finland) Juho Hänninen	7:05.1	101.79 km/h	(United Kingdom) Kris Meeke
Leg 2 (6 Mar)	SS11	11:00	Nobre	10.47 km	(Finland) Juho Hänninen	6:34.1	95.64 km/h	(United Kingdom) Kris Meeke
Leg 2 (6 Mar)	SS12	13:05	Rio Pesqueiro 2	15.06 km	stage cancelled			(United Kingdom) Kris Meeke
Leg 2 (6 Mar)	SS13	14:20	Quattro Barras 2	12.02 km	(Finland) Juho Hänninen	6:57.7	103.60 km/h	(United Kingdom) Kris Meeke
Leg 2 (6 Mar)	SS14	14:40	Campina	23.07 km	(Finland) Juho Hänninen	14:39.0	94.48 km/h	(United Kingdom) Kris Meeke
Leg 2 (6 Mar)	SS15	15:15	Pinhais	3.38 km	stage cancelled			(United Kingdom) Kris Meeke

- * The super-special had been due to set the running order for the first leg with the top ten running in reverse order from where they finished. With the stage's cancellation, it was announced that the competitors would go through the stages in championship order.
