= 2011 Cyprus Rally =

Motor rally competition

2011 Cyprus Rally 39th FxPro Cyprus Rally
Round 11 of the 2011 Intercontinental Rally Challenge season
← Previous event
- Host country: Cyprus
- Rally base: Paphos
- Dates run: 3 – 5 November 2011
- Stages: 11 (187.58 km; 116.56 miles)
- Stage surface: Gravel and Tarmac
- Overall distance: 624.56 km (388.08 miles)

Statistics
- Crews: 34 at start, 26 at finish

Overall results
- Overall winner: (Norway) Andreas Mikkelsen (United Kingdom) Škoda UK

The 2011 Cyprus Rally, officially the 39th FxPro Cyprus Rally, was the eleventh and final round of the 2011 Intercontinental Rally Challenge (IRC) season. The eleven stage gravel rally took place over 3–5 November 2011.

The rally offered double points towards the respective IRC championships, meaning that the overall rally winner, as well as class winners, gained 50 points instead of the usual 25. With victory, Andreas Mikkelsen became the youngest IRC champion, winning the title by 1.5 points ahead of Jan Kopecký.

== Introduction ==
The rally, which was run for the 39th time, was based in Paphos – moving from its 2010 base of Limassol – with a super special stage making up Thursday's running. On Friday, four stages covering 84.62 km (52.58 mi) were run, with the final six stages, consisting of 99.76 km (61.99 mi) being completed on the Saturday.

With double points on offer for the rally, six drivers remained in championship contention after the previous event at Rally Scotland. Jan Kopecký held the championship lead with 131 points, ahead of Škoda Motorsport team-mate and defending champion Juho Hänninen, who was six points in arrears. Team Peugeot Belgium-Luxembourg's Thierry Neuville, the highest placed Peugeot driver, held third place with 115 points, ahead of Škoda UK's Andreas Mikkelsen on 111.5, Bryan Bouffier of Peugeot France on 110.5 and Freddy Loix, representing the BFO-Škoda Rally Team, on 103. The championship battle was later reduced to five drivers, as Bouffier did not travel to Cyprus.

== Results ==
=== Overall ===
Pos.	Driver	Co-driver	Car	Time	Difference	Points
1.	(Norway) Andreas Mikkelsen	(Norway) Ola Fløene	Škoda Fabia S2000	2:25:18.5	0.0	50
2.	(Czech Republic) Jan Kopecký	(Czech Republic) Pavel Dresler	Škoda Fabia S2000	2:26:59.0	1:40.5	36
3.	(Sweden) Patrik Sandell	(Sweden) Staffan Parmander	Škoda Fabia S2000	2:28:13.3	2:54.8	30
4.	(Estonia) Karl Kruuda	(Estonia) Martin Järveoja	Škoda Fabia S2000	2:29:51.5	4:33.0	24
5.	(Belgium) Freddy Loix	(Belgium) Frédéric Miclotte	Škoda Fabia S2000	2:30:53.9	5:35.4	20
6.	(Germany) Matthias Kahle	(Germany) Peter Göbel	Škoda Fabia S2000	2:33:07.4	7:48.9	16
7.	(Japan) Toshi Arai	(Australia) Dale Moscatt	Subaru Impreza R4	2:33:34.7	8:16.2	12
8.	(Germany) Mark Wallenwein	(Germany) Stefan Kopczyk	Škoda Fabia S2000	2:38:25.2	13:06.7	8
9. (10.)	(Cyprus) Doros Loucaides	(Cyprus) Savvas Laos	Peugeot 207 S2000	2:40:26.3	15:07.8	4
10. (11.)	(Cyprus) Charalambos Timotheou	(Cyprus) Pambos Laos	Mitsubishi Lancer Evolution IX	2:40:44.2	15:25.7	2

=== Special stages ===
Day	Stage	Time	Name	Length	Winner	Time	Avg. spd.	Rally leader
Leg 1 (3–4 November)	SS1	19:00	LTV Super Special Stage	3.20 km	(Norway) Andreas Mikkelsen	2:48.9	68.21 km/h	(Norway) Andreas Mikkelsen
Leg 1 (3–4 November)	SS2	10:47	Koilinia 1	24.15 km	(Norway) Andreas Mikkelsen	20:23.8	71.04 km/h	(Norway) Andreas Mikkelsen
Leg 1 (3–4 November)	SS3	12:10	Salamiou 1	18.16 km	(Belgium) Thierry Neuville	11:51.4	91.90 km/h	(Belgium) Thierry Neuville
Leg 1 (3–4 November)	SS4	14:47	Koilinia 2	24.15 km	(Norway) Andreas Mikkelsen	20:05.6	72.11 km/h	(Norway) Andreas Mikkelsen
Leg 1 (3–4 November)	SS5	16:10	Salamiou 2	18.16 km	(Norway) Andreas Mikkelsen	11:51.2	91.92 km/h	(Norway) Andreas Mikkelsen
Leg 2 (5 November)	SS6	9:29	Gialia 1	14.82 km	(Norway) Andreas Mikkelsen	13:03.9	68.06 km/h	(Norway) Andreas Mikkelsen
Leg 2 (5 November)	SS7	10:12	Stavros 1	15.91 km	(Norway) Andreas Mikkelsen	11:25.7	83.53 km/h	(Norway) Andreas Mikkelsen
Leg 2 (5 November)	SS8	11:10	Anadiou 1	19.15 km	(Qatar) Nasser Al-Attiyah	14:19.9	80.17 km/h	(Norway) Andreas Mikkelsen
Leg 2 (5 November)	SS9	14:29	Gialia 2	14.82 km	(Finland) Juho Hänninen	12:48.3	69.44 km/h	(Norway) Andreas Mikkelsen
Leg 2 (5 November)	SS10	15:12	Stavros 2	15.91 km	(Sweden) Patrik Sandell	11:40.6	81.75 km/h	(Norway) Andreas Mikkelsen
Leg 2 (5 November)	SS11	16:10	Anadiou 2	19.15 km	(Norway) Andreas Mikkelsen	14:23.5	79.84 km/h	(Norway) Andreas Mikkelsen
