= 2010 Rally Azores =

Motor rally competition

2010 Sata Rally Azores 45º Sata Rallye Açores
Round 7 of the 2010 Intercontinental Rally Challenge season
| ← Previous event | Next event → |
- Rally Azores Logo
- Host country: Portugal
- Rally base: Ponta Delgada, São Miguel, Azores
- Dates run: July 15 – 17 2010
- Stages: 19 (217.90 km; 135.40 miles)
- Stage surface: Gravel
- Overall distance: 799.99 km (497.09 miles)

Statistics
- Crews: 38 at start, 22 at finish

Overall results
- Overall winner: Bruno Magalhães; Peugeot Sport Portugal

The 2010 Sata Rally Azores, officially 45º Sata Rallye Açores, was the seventh round of the 2010 Intercontinental Rally Challenge (IRC) season. The 19 stage gravel rally took place on the island of São Miguel in the Azores between 15–17 July 2010.

== Introduction ==
The rally was based in the major city of Ponta Delgada. Day one consisted of three stages covering a total of 24.40 km (15.16 mi). Day two covered a total of 98.46 km (61.18 mi) over nine stages with the remaining seven stages, covering 95.04 km (59.06 mi) were completed on day three.

== Results ==
Bruno Magalhães became the sixth different winner of an IRC rally in 2010, after taking advantage of troubles for the Škodas of championship contenders Juho Hänninen and Jan Kopecký over the closing stages of the rally. Magalhães had dominated the early running of the event, holding a 2.2-second advantage into the final day. Hänninen eroded the gap on the first stage on Saturday, but would have to wait until stage fifteen to take the lead, as stage fourteen was cancelled after Andreas Mikkelsen hit a stray cow. Hänninen would hold the lead until the penultimate stage, when he picked up a right-front puncture on the Graminhais test, losing nearly two minutes to his chasers, falling to fourth behind Kopecký, Magalhães and Kris Meeke. Kopecký held a lead of 6.4 seconds going into the final 21.94 km (13.63 mi) Tronqueira test over Magalhães. However, Kopecký's bid for a second win of the season would come to a premature end as he slid off the road with four kilometres remaining in the stage. His bad luck rewarded Magalhães with his first-ever win in the Intercontinental Rally Challenge, with Meeke coming home in second to record Peugeot's first 1-2 in the series since Meeke and Nicolas Vouilloz finished in those positions at the 2009 Rally International de Curitiba. Hänninen's third-place finish extended his championship lead over Kopecký to nine points, with Magalhães moving into third position.

=== Overall ===
| Pos. | Driver | Co-driver | Car | Time | Difference | Points |
|---|---|---|---|---|---|---|
| 1. | (Portugal) Bruno Magalhães | (Portugal) Carlos Magalhães | Peugeot 207 S2000 | 2:34:00.4 | 0.0 | 10 |
| 2. | (United Kingdom) Kris Meeke | (Republic of Ireland) Paul Nagle | Peugeot 207 S2000 | 2:35:00.5 | 1:00.1 | 8 |
| 3. | (Finland) Juho Hänninen | (Finland) Mikko Markkula | Škoda Fabia S2000 | 2:35:21.1 | 1:20.7 | 6 |
| 4. | (Norway) Andreas Mikkelsen | (Norway) Ola Fløene | Ford Fiesta S2000 | 2:38:46.0 | 4:45.6 | 5 |
| 5. | (Portugal) Ricardo Moura | (Portugal) Sancho Eiró | Mitsubishi Lancer Evolution IX | 2:39:22.4 | 5:22.0 | 4 |
| 6. | (Portugal) Vítor Pascoal | (Portugal) Mário Castro | Peugeot 207 S2000 | 2:42:59.1 | 8:58.7 | 3 |
| 7. | (Portugal) Pedro Vale | (Portugal) Rui Medeiros | Mitsubishi Lancer Evolution VII | 2:44:55.7 | 10:55.3 | 2 |
| 8. | (Portugal) Sérgio Silva | (Portugal) Paulo Leal | Subaru Impreza WRX STI | 2:46:54.9 | 12:54.5 | 1 |

=== Special stages ===
| Day | Stage | Time | Name | Length | Winner | Time | Avg. spd. | Rally leader |
|---|---|---|---|---|---|---|---|---|
| Leg 1 (15 July) | SS1 | 16:40 | Lagoa/Marques 1 | 14.90 km | (Portugal) Bruno Magalhães | 10:14.4 | 87.30 km/h | (Portugal) Bruno Magalhães |
| Leg 1 (15 July) | SS2 | 17:19 | Coroa da Mata | 7.50 km | (Finland) Juho Hänninen | 6:30.3 | 69.18 km/h | (Portugal) Bruno Magalhães |
| Leg 1 (15 July) | SS3 | 17:55 | Grupo Marques 1 | 2.00 km | (Norway) Andreas Mikkelsen | 1:47.3 | 67.10 km/h | (Finland) Juho Hänninen |
| Leg 2 (16 July) | SS4 | 10:03 | Batalha Golfe 1 | 7.90 km | (Portugal) Bruno Magalhães | 5:48.0 | 81.72 km/h | (Portugal) Bruno Magalhães |
| Leg 2 (16 July) | SS5 | 10:38 | Feteiras 1 | 7.47 km | (Czech Republic) Jan Kopecký | 5:48.5 | 77.16 km/h | (Portugal) Bruno Magalhães |
| Leg 2 (16 July) | SS6 | 11:03 | Sete Cidades 1 | 18.30 km | (Portugal) Bruno Magalhães | 13:14.9 | 82.88 km/h | (Portugal) Bruno Magalhães |
| Leg 2 (16 July) | SS7 | 12:57 | Batalha Golfe 2 | 7.90 km | (Finland) Juho Hänninen | 5:39.1 | 83.87 km/h | (Portugal) Bruno Magalhães |
| Leg 2 (16 July) | SS8 | 13:32 | Feteiras 2 | 7.47 km | (United Kingdom) Kris Meeke | 5:40.7 | 78.93 km/h | (Portugal) Bruno Magalhães |
| Leg 2 (16 July) | SS9 | 13:57 | Sete Cidades 2 | 18.30 km | (Portugal) Bruno Magalhães | 13:05.9 | 83.83 km/h | (Portugal) Bruno Magalhães |
| Leg 2 (16 July) | SS10 | 15:57 | Lagoa/Marques 2 | 14.90 km | (Finland) Juho Hänninen | 10:03.8 | 88.84 km/h | (Portugal) Bruno Magalhães |
| Leg 2 (16 July) | SS11 | 16:50 | Achada das Furnas 1 | 8.42 km | (Czech Republic) Jan Kopecký | 6:01.2 | 83.92 km/h | (Portugal) Bruno Magalhães |
| Leg 2 (16 July) | SS12 | 17:13 | Lomba da Maia 1 | 7.80 km | (Finland) Juho Hänninen | 4:15.1 | 110.07 km/h | (Portugal) Bruno Magalhães |
| Leg 3 (17 July) | SS13 | 10:17 | Achada das Furnas 2 | 8.42 km | (Finland) Juho Hänninen | 5:51.6 | 86.21 km/h | (Portugal) Bruno Magalhães (Finland) Juho Hänninen |
| Leg 3 (17 July) | SS14 | 10:45 | Graminhais 1 | 20.68 km | stage cancelled | | | (Portugal) Bruno Magalhães (Finland) Juho Hänninen |
| Leg 3 (17 July) | SS15 | 11:33 | Tronqueira 1 | 21.94 km | (Portugal) Bernardo Sousa | 18:42.2 | 70.38 km/h | (Finland) Juho Hänninen |
| Leg 3 (17 July) | SS16 | 13:20 | Grupo Marques 2 | 2.00 km | (Finland) Juho Hänninen | 1:46.6 | 67.54 km/h | (Finland) Juho Hänninen |
| Leg 3 (17 July) | SS17 | 15:22 | Lomba da Maia 2 | 7.80 km | (Finland) Juho Hänninen | 4:15.8 | 109.77 km/h | (Finland) Juho Hänninen |
| Leg 3 (17 July) | SS18 | 15:53 | Graminhais 2 | 20.68 km | (Czech Republic) Jan Kopecký | 15:29.7 | 80.08 km/h | (Czech Republic) Jan Kopecký |
| Leg 3 (17 July) | SS19 | 16:41 | Tronqueira 2 | 21.94 km | (United Kingdom) Kris Meeke | 18:35.5 | 70.81 km/h | (Portugal) Bruno Magalhães |
