= 2010 Rally Argentina =

Motor rally competition

2010 Rally Argentina 30º Rally Argentina
Round 3 of the 2010 Intercontinental Rally Challenge
← Previous event	Next event →
- Rally Argentina Logo
- Host country: Argentina
- Rally base: Córdoba–Villa Carlos Paz
- Dates run: March 19 – 21, 2010
- Stages: 15 (238.62 km; 148.27 miles)
- Stage surface: Gravel
- Overall distance: 1,013.51 km (629.77 miles)

Statistics
- Crews: 63 at start, 31 at finish

Overall results
- Overall winner: (Finland) Juho Hänninen (Czech Republic) Škoda Motorsport

The 2010 Rally Argentina was the 30th running of Rally Argentina and the third round of the 2010 Intercontinental Rally Challenge season. The rally consisted of 15 special stages and took place over 19–21 March 2010. The rally was also a round of the South American Rally Championship and the Argentine Rally Championship.

== Introduction ==
The rally started in Villa Carlos Paz, a city in the center-north of the province of Córdoba, on Friday 19 March with a 3.30 km (2.05 mi) super special stage in the town. The event was made up of 15 gravel stages covering a total of 238.62 km (148.27 mi) all completed in daylight. The event on Saturday consisted of seven stages and was centred on the town of San Agustín and around Valle Hermoso on Sunday. The final stage was a repeat of the super special stage in Villa Carlos Paz.

Nasser Al-Attiyah was seeded number 1 in his Škoda Fabia S2000, with local Federico Villagra taking number 2 in his Ford Fiesta S2000. Other entrants included current championship leader Juho Hänninen and reigning champion Kris Meeke. A total of 63 cars took part in the event.

== Results ==
Škodas dominated the event, winning all bar one stage of the event. After Kris Meeke won the opening stage in Villa Carlos Paz, Juho Hänninen took control of the rally on the second stage and never lost the lead. Hänninen won eleven of the remaining fourteen stages, as he won the rally by 51 seconds. The other two drivers to win a stage, Guy Wilks and Jan Kopecký finished second and third to complete a clean sweep of the podium for Škoda. Kopecký was the main beneficiary of the retirement of Meeke on the road section after stage fourteen, as the suspension spot-weld failed on the Northern Irish driver's Peugeot during the stage.

=== Overall ===
Pos.	Driver	Co-driver	Car	Time	Difference	Points
1.	(Finland) Juho Hänninen	(Finland) Mikko Markkula	Škoda Fabia S2000	2:30:38.1	0.0	10
2.	(United Kingdom) Guy Wilks	(United Kingdom) Phil Pugh	Škoda Fabia S2000	2:31:29.1	51.0	8
3.	(Czech Republic) Jan Kopecký	(Czech Republic) Petr Starý	Škoda Fabia S2000	2:32:58.2	2:20.1	6
4.	(Argentina) Gabriel Pozzo	(Argentina) Daniel Stillo	Subaru Impreza WRX STI	2:35:42.0	5:03.9	5
5.	(Argentina) Federico Villagra	(Argentina) Jorge Pérez Companc	Ford Fiesta S2000	2:35:52.3	5:14.2	4
6.	(Portugal) Bruno Magalhães	(Portugal) Carlos Magalhães	Peugeot 207 S2000	2:36:49.1	6:11.0	3
7.	(Argentina) Nicolás Madero	(Argentina) Guillermo Piazzaro	Mitsubishi Lancer Evolution X	2:37:25.6	6:47.5	2
8.	(Paraguay) Diego Dominguez	(Argentina) Edgardo Galindo	Mitsubishi Lancer Evolution X	2:38:17.4	7:39.3	1

=== Special stages ===
Day	Stage	Time	Name	Length	Winner	Time	Avg. spd.	Rally leader
Leg 1 (19–20 Mar)	SS1	17:00	Super Special Stage Carlos Paz 1	3.30 km	(United Kingdom) Kris Meeke	2:32.8	77.75 km/h	(United Kingdom) Kris Meeke
Leg 1 (19–20 Mar)	SS2	08:13	Las Bajadas – Villa del Dique 1	16.57 km	(Finland) Juho Hänninen	9:28.2	104.98 km/h	(Finland) Juho Hänninen
Leg 1 (19–20 Mar)	SS3	09:00	Amboy – Santa Mónica 1	20.43 km	(Finland) Juho Hänninen	11:03.2	110.90 km/h	(Finland) Juho Hänninen
Leg 1 (19–20 Mar)	SS4	09:41	Santa Rosa – San Agustín 1	21.53 km	(United Kingdom) Guy Wilks	13:41.3	94.37 km/h	(Finland) Juho Hänninen
Leg 1 (19–20 Mar)	SS5	10:24	San Agustín – Villa General Belgrano	8.43 km	(Finland) Juho Hänninen	6:11.6	81.67 km/h	(Finland) Juho Hänninen
Leg 1 (19–20 Mar)	SS6	14:57	Las Bajadas – Villa del Dique 2	16.57 km	(Finland) Juho Hänninen	9:21.7	106.20 km/h	(Finland) Juho Hänninen
Leg 1 (19–20 Mar)	SS7	15:44	Amboy – Santa Mónica 2	20.43 km	(Finland) Juho Hänninen	10:52.9	112.65 km/h	(Finland) Juho Hänninen
Leg 1 (19–20 Mar)	SS8	16:25	Santa Rosa – San Agustín 2	21.53 km	(Finland) Juho Hänninen	13:39.5	94.58 km/h	(Finland) Juho Hänninen
Leg 2 (21 Mar)	SS9	08:13	La Cumbre – Agua de Oro	15.06 km	(Finland) Juho Hänninen	12:56.4	69.83 km/h	(Finland) Juho Hänninen
Leg 2 (21 Mar)	SS10	09:13	Ascochinga – La Cumbre	22.40 km	(Finland) Juho Hänninen	15:08.3	88.78 km/h	(Finland) Juho Hänninen
Leg 2 (21 Mar)	SS11	10:08	Valle Hermoso – Casa Grande 1	11.34 km	(Finland) Juho Hänninen	7:26.3	91.47 km/h	(Finland) Juho Hänninen
Leg 2 (21 Mar)	SS12	10:40	Cosquín – Villa Allende 1	19.18 km	(Finland) Juho Hänninen	14:05.8	81.64 km/h	(Finland) Juho Hänninen
Leg 2 (21 Mar)	SS13	14:08	Valle Hermoso – Casa Grande 2	11.34 km	(Czech Republic) Jan Kopecký	7:26.9	91.35 km/h	(Finland) Juho Hänninen
Leg 2 (21 Mar)	SS14	14:40	Cosquín – Villa Allende	19.18 km	(Finland) Juho Hänninen	14:07.0	81.52 km/h	(Finland) Juho Hänninen
Leg 2 (21 Mar)	SS15	16:23	Super Special Stage Carlos Paz 2	3.30 km	(Czech Republic) Jan Kopecký	2:29.4	79.52 km/h	(Finland) Juho Hänninen
