= 2010 Rally Islas Canarias =

Motor rally competition

2010 Rally Islas Canarias 34º Trophy El Corte Inglés
Round 4 of the 2010 Intercontinental Rally Challenge season
← Previous event	Next event →
- Rally Islas Canarias Logo
- Host country: (Spain) Canary Islands
- Rally base: Las Palmas
- Dates run: April 29 – 1 May 2010
- Stages: 15 (221.59 km; 137.69 miles)
- Stage surface: Asphalt
- Overall distance: 670.39 km (416.56 miles)

Statistics
- Crews: 59 at start, 42 at finish

Overall results
- Overall winner: (Czech Republic) Jan Kopecký (Czech Republic) Škoda Motorsport

The 2010 Rally Islas Canarias was the fourth round of the 2010 Intercontinental Rally Challenge (IRC) season. The fifteen stage asphalt rally took place on the island of Gran Canaria between 29 April and 1 May 2010. The rally, which is also a round of the Spanish Asphalt Championship, was a late entry in the IRC calendar after the withdrawal of the Rally Principe de Asturias.

== Introduction ==
The rally was based in the capital Las Palmas with a ceremonial start on Thursday 29 April 2010. Day one consisted of nine stages covering a total of 137.25 km (85.28 mi) with day two covering a total of 84.34 km (52.41 mi) over six stages. In addition to a host of local drivers and those who travelled from Spain, several leading IRC competitors confirmed that they were taking part in the event. They included Jan Kopecký, Guy Wilks and Juho Hanninen representing Škoda with Bruno Magalhães and Kris Meeke entered for Peugeot.

== Results ==
=== Overall ===
Pos.	Driver	Co-driver	Car	Time	Difference	Points
1.	(Czech Republic) Jan Kopecký	(Czech Republic) Petr Starý	Škoda Fabia S2000	2:12:27.4	0.0	10
2.	(Finland) Juho Hänninen	(Finland) Mikko Markkula	Škoda Fabia S2000	2:12:36.5	9.1	8
3.	(United Kingdom) Guy Wilks	(United Kingdom) Phil Pugh	Škoda Fabia S2000	2:13:03.8	36.4	6
4.	(United Kingdom) Kris Meeke	(Republic of Ireland) Paul Nagle	Peugeot 207 S2000	2:13:32.9	1:05.5	5
5.	(Portugal) Bruno Magalhães	(Portugal) Carlos Magalhães	Peugeot 207 S2000	2:13:45.2	1:17.8	4
6.	(Spain) Alberto Hevia	(Spain) Alberto Iglesias	Škoda Fabia S2000	2:13:52.5	1:25.1	3
7. (12.)	(Spain) Ruben Gracia	(Spain) Diego Sanjuan	Mitsubishi Lancer Evolution X	2:22:33.9	10:06.5	2
8. (13.)	(Spain) Sergio Vallejo	(Spain) Diego Vallejo	Ford Fiesta S2000	2:25:17.1	12:49.7	1

=== Special stages ===
Day	Stage	Time	Name	Length	Winner	Time	Avg. spd.	Rally leader
Leg 1 (30 Apr)	SS1	9:00	Moya I	8.61 km	(United Kingdom) Kris Meeke	5:04.4	101.83 km/h	(United Kingdom) Kris Meeke
Leg 1 (30 Apr)	SS2	9:22	Fontanales I	24.85 km	(Finland) Juho Hänninen	16:03.8	92.82 km/h	(United Kingdom) Kris Meeke
Leg 1 (30 Apr)	SS3	10:20	Teror I	11.83 km	(Czech Republic) Jan Kopecký	7:09.7	99.11 km/h	(United Kingdom) Kris Meeke
Leg 1 (30 Apr)	SS4	12:55	Moya II	8.61 km	(United Kingdom) Kris Meeke	4:58.8	103.73 km/h	(United Kingdom) Kris Meeke
Leg 1 (30 Apr)	SS5	13:17	Fontanales II	24.85 km	(United Kingdom) Kris Meeke	15:52.4	93.93 km/h	(United Kingdom) Kris Meeke
Leg 1 (30 Apr)	SS6	14:15	Teror II	11.83 km	(United Kingdom) Kris Meeke	7:06.4	99.88 km/h	(United Kingdom) Kris Meeke
Leg 1 (30 Apr)	SS7	17:33	Era del Cardón	8.92 km	(United Kingdom) Kris Meeke	5:23.9	99.14 km/h	(United Kingdom) Kris Meeke
Leg 1 (30 Apr)	SS8	17:55	Ingenio	29.95 km	(Czech Republic) Jan Kopecký	18:27.0	97.40 km/h	(Czech Republic) Jan Kopecký
Leg 1 (30 Apr)	SS9	19:03	La Atalaya de Santa Brigida	7.80 km	stage cancelled			(Czech Republic) Jan Kopecký
Leg 2 (1 May)	SS10	8:48	Santa Brigida I	7.80 km	(Czech Republic) Jan Kopecký	4:41.9	99.61 km/h	(Czech Republic) Jan Kopecký
Leg 2 (1 May)	SS11	9:28	Telde I	25.26 km	(Spain) Alberto Hevia	15:05.4	100.44 km/h	(Czech Republic) Jan Kopecký
Leg 2 (1 May)	SS12	10:23	Agüimes I	9.11 km	(Czech Republic) Jan Kopecký	5:29.1	99.65 km/h	(Czech Republic) Jan Kopecký
Leg 2 (1 May)	SS13	12:54	Santa Brigida II	7.80 km	(United Kingdom) Kris Meeke	4:39.1	100.61 km/h	(Czech Republic) Jan Kopecký
Leg 2 (1 May)	SS14	13:34	Telde II	25.26 km	(United Kingdom) Kris Meeke	15:37.4	97.01 km/h	(Czech Republic) Jan Kopecký
Leg 2 (1 May)	SS15	14:29	Agüimes II	9.11 km	(United Kingdom) Kris Meeke	5:28.2	99.93 km/h	(Czech Republic) Jan Kopecký
