= 2010 Cyprus Rally =

Motor rally competition

2010 FxPro Cyprus Rally 38th FxPro Cyprus Rally
Round 12 of the 2010 Intercontinental Rally Challenge season
← Previous event
- Cyprus Rally Logo
- Host country: Cyprus
- Rally base: Limassol
- Stages: 14 (236.64 km; 147.04 miles)
- Stage surface: Asphalt/gravel
- Overall distance: 849.12 km (527.62 miles)

Statistics
- Crews: 40 at start, 27 at finish

Overall results
- Overall winner: (Qatar) Nasser Al-Attiyah (Qatar) Nasser Al-Attiyah

The 2010 FxPro Cyprus Rally, was the 12th round of the 2010 Intercontinental Rally Challenge (IRC) season. The fourteen stage mixed surface rally took place over 4–6 November 2010. As well as being the final round of the IRC, the event formed the penultimate round of the 2010 Middle East Rally Championship (MERC).

== Introduction ==
The rally, which was based in Limassol, had a 2.45 km (1.52 mi) all-asphalt Super Special Stage, purpose-built at Limassol's extensive port facilities being run twice during the event. With both the drivers and manufacturers titles already decided, none of the top competitors in the IRC made the trip to the event. Andreas Mikkelsen, who was seventh in the championship heading into the event, was the highest placed driver to take part. Other IRC regulars included Daniel Oliveira and Burcu Çetinkaya. Nasser Al-Attiyah headed the field of drivers competing in the MERC.

== Results ==
=== Overall ===
Pos.	Driver	Co-driver	Car	Time	Difference	Points
1.	(Qatar) Nasser Al-Attiyah	(Italy) Giovanni Bernacchini	Ford Fiesta S2000	3:11:53.5	0.0	10
2.	(Lebanon) Roger Feghali	(Lebanon) Joseph Matar	Škoda Fabia S2000	3:12:24.2	30.7	8
3.	(Czech Republic) Martin Prokop	(Czech Republic) Jan Tománek	Ford Fiesta S2000	3:16:35.5	4:42.0	6
4.	(Czech Republic) Jaromír Tarabus	(Czech Republic) Daniel Trunkát	Ford Fiesta S2000	3:17:34.0	5:40.5	5
5.	(Cyprus) Nicos Thomas	(Cyprus) Angelos Loizides	Peugeot 207 S2000	3:18:39.0	6:45.5	4
6.	(Czech Republic) Roman Kresta	(Czech Republic) Petr Gross	Mitsubishi Lancer Evolution IX	3:19:10.1	7:16.6	3
7.	(Cyprus) Charalambos Timotheou	(Cyprus) Pambos Laos	Mitsubishi Lancer Evolution X	3:24:37.5	12:44.0	2
8.	(Cyprus) Constantinos Tingirides	(Cyprus) Panayiotis Shialos	Mitsubishi Lancer Evolution IX	3:25:14.1	13:20.6	1

=== Special stages ===
Day	Stage	Time	Name	Length	Winner	Time	Avg. spd.	Rally leader
Leg 1 (4–5 Nov)	SS1	20:30	SSS Lemesos 1	2.45 km	(Qatar) Nasser Al-Attiyah	2:21.7	62.24 km/h	(Qatar) Nasser Al-Attiyah
Leg 1 (4–5 Nov)	SS2	9:09	Kalavasos 1	10.42 km	(Czech Republic) Martin Prokop	8:34.3	72.94 km/h	(Qatar) Nasser Al-Attiyah
Leg 1 (4–5 Nov)	SS3	10:07	Lythrodontas 1	23.45 km	(Czech Republic) Martin Prokop	19:25.7	72.42 km/h	(Qatar) Nasser Al-Attiyah
Leg 1 (4–5 Nov)	SS4	11:10	Agioi Vavatsinias 1	17.31 km	(Qatar) Nasser Al-Attiyah	16:10.5	64.21 km/h	(Qatar) Nasser Al-Attiyah
Leg 1 (4–5 Nov)	SS5	14:09	Kalavasos 2	10.42 km	(France) Bryan Bouffier	8:26.4	74.08 km/h	(Qatar) Nasser Al-Attiyah
Leg 1 (4–5 Nov)	SS6	15:07	Lythrodontas 2	23.45 km	(France) Bryan Bouffier	19:17.3	72.95 km/h	(Qatar) Nasser Al-Attiyah
Leg 1 (4–5 Nov)	SS7	16:10	Agioi Vavatsinias 2	17.31 km	(France) Bryan Bouffier	16:06.1	64.50 km/h	(Czech Republic) Martin Prokop
Leg 1 (4–5 Nov)	SS8	19:35	SSS Lemesos 2	2.45 km	(Czech Republic) Martin Prokop	2:18.2	63.82 km/h	(Czech Republic) Martin Prokop
Leg 2 (6 Nov)	SS9	9:04	Alassa 1	12.76 km	(Czech Republic) Martin Prokop	8:40.0	88.34 km/h	(Czech Republic) Martin Prokop
Leg 2 (6 Nov)	SS10	9:47	Foini 1	31.70 km	(France) Bryan Bouffier	28:08.1	67.60 km/h	(Qatar) Nasser Al-Attiyah
Leg 2 (6 Nov)	SS11	11:10	Galataria 1	17.02 km	(Lebanon) Roger Feghali	11:24.3	89.54 km/h	(Qatar) Nasser Al-Attiyah
Leg 2 (6 Nov)	SS12	14:04	Alassa 2	12.76 km	(Qatar) Nasser Al-Attiyah	8:41.8	88.03 km/h	(Qatar) Nasser Al-Attiyah
Leg 2 (6 Nov)	SS13	14:47	Foini 2	31.70 km	(Qatar) Nasser Al-Attiyah	28:14.9	67.33 km/h	(Qatar) Nasser Al-Attiyah
Leg 2 (6 Nov)	SS14	16:10	Galataria 2	17.02 km	(Qatar) Nasser Al-Attiyah	11:09.0	91.59 km/h	(Qatar) Nasser Al-Attiyah
