= 2011 Ypres Rally =

Motor rally competition

2011 GEKO Ypres Rally
Round 5 of the 2011 Intercontinental Rally Challenge season
← Previous event	Next event →
- Host country: Belgium
- Rally base: Ypres
- Dates run: June 23 – 25 2011
- Stages: 18 (287.89 km; 178.89 miles)
- Stage surface: Asphalt
- Overall distance: 649.87 km (403.81 miles)

Statistics
- Crews: 115 at start, 57 at finish

Overall results
- Overall winner: (Belgium) Freddy Loix (Belgium) BFO-Škoda Rally Team

The 2011 GEKO Ypres Rally, was the fifth round of the 2011 Intercontinental Rally Challenge and fourth round of the 2011 European Rally Championship. The event was held between 23–25 June 2011, and was based in the town of Ypres in Belgium.

== Introduction ==
The rally was held over two days with a total of 287.89 km (178.89 mi) covered in eighteen asphalt special stages. Friday had six stages with Saturday having a total of twelve stages. In addition to IRC frontrunners Bryan Bouffier, Jan Kopecký and Thierry Neuville, other entries in S2000 cars included Freddy Loix (Škoda Fabia S2000), Abarth driver Luca Rossetti and factory Proton pair, Giandomenico Basso and Per-Gunnar Andersson. Kopecký failed to start the event however, after a crash in shakedown that caused an injury to his co-driver, Petr Starý.

== Results ==
Freddy Loix won the event for the seventh time, having led from start to finish.

=== Overall ===
Pos.	Driver	Co-driver	Car	Time	Difference	Points
1.	(Belgium) Freddy Loix	(Belgium) Frédéric Miclotte	Škoda Fabia S2000	2:40:03.9	0.0	25
2.	(Netherlands) Hans Weijs, Jr.	(Belgium) Bjorn Degandt	Škoda Fabia S2000	2:44:00.8	3:56.9	18
3.	(Poland) Michał Sołowow	(Poland) Maciej Baran	Ford Fiesta S2000	2:46:10.7	6:06.8	15
4. (5.)	(United Kingdom) Guy Wilks	(United Kingdom) Phil Pugh	Peugeot 207 S2000	2:46:37.7	6:33.8	12
5. (6.)	(Estonia) Karl Kruuda	(Estonia) Martin Järveoja	Škoda Fabia S2000	2:46:44.5	6:40.6	10
6. (7.)	(Finland) Toni Gardemeister	(Finland) Tapio Suominen	Škoda Fabia S2000	2:47:01.3	6:57.4	8
7. (8.)	(Italy) Luca Rossetti	(Italy) Matteo Chiarcossi	Abarth Grande Punto S2000	2:47:28.9	7:25.0	6
8. (9.)	(Netherlands) Bernhard ten Brinke	(Netherlands) Davy Thierie	Škoda Fabia S2000	2:47:41.2	7:37.3	4
9. (10.)	(Republic of Ireland) Robert Barrable	(Republic of Ireland) Damien Connolly	Škoda Fabia S2000	2:47:57.7	7:53.8	2
10. (11.)	(France) Julien Maurin	(France) Olivier Urai	Ford Fiesta S2000	2:49:41.9	9:38.0	1

=== Special stages ===
Day	Stage	Time	Name	Length	Winner	Time	Avg. spd.	Rally leader
Leg 1 (24 June)	SS1	16:49	Dikkebus–Westouter 1	14.30 km	(Belgium) Freddy Loix	7:53.0	108.84 km/h	(Belgium) Freddy Loix
Leg 1 (24 June)	SS2	17:36	Mesen–Sauvegarde 1	14.75 km	(Belgium) Freddy Loix	8:02.5	110.05 km/h	(Belgium) Freddy Loix
Leg 1 (24 June)	SS3	18:15	Langemark 1	18.84 km	(Belgium) Freddy Loix	9:44.2	116.10 km/h	(Belgium) Freddy Loix
Leg 1 (24 June)	SS4	20:10	Dikkebus–Westouter 2	14.30 km	(Belgium) Freddy Loix	7:52.0	109.07 km/h	(Belgium) Freddy Loix
Leg 1 (24 June)	SS5	20:57	Mesen–Sauvegarde 2	14.75 km	(Belgium) Freddy Loix	7:54.1	112.00 km/h	(Belgium) Freddy Loix
Leg 1 (24 June)	SS6	21:36	Langemark 2	18.84 km	(Belgium) Freddy Loix	9:45.3	115.88 km/h	(Belgium) Freddy Loix
Leg 2 (25 June)	SS7	11:18	Proven–Vleteren 1	14.76 km	(United Kingdom) Guy Wilks	8:24.8	105.26 km/h	(Belgium) Freddy Loix
Leg 2 (25 June)	SS8	11:40	Watou 1	12.33 km	(Belgium) Freddy Loix	7:05.5	104.32 km/h	(Belgium) Freddy Loix
Leg 2 (25 June)	SS9	12:16	Heuvelland 1	24.74 km	(Belgium) Freddy Loix	13:50.3	107.27 km/h	(Belgium) Freddy Loix
Leg 2 (25 June)	SS10	14:03	Hollebeke 1	28.82 km	(Belgium) Freddy Loix	16:20.3	105.84 km/h	(Belgium) Freddy Loix
Leg 2 (25 June)	SS11	15:06	Lille–Eurométropole	8.47 km	(France) Bryan Bouffier	4:30.9	112.56 km/h	(Belgium) Freddy Loix
Leg 2 (25 June)	SS12	15:38	Show Wasquehal	1.88 km	(Norway) Andreas Mikkelsen	1:17.3	87.55 km/h	(Belgium) Freddy Loix
Leg 2 (25 June)	SS13	16:41	Kemmelberg 1	10.23 km	(France) Bryan Bouffier	5:58.4	102.76 km/h	(Belgium) Freddy Loix
Leg 2 (25 June)	SS14	18:27	Proven–Vleteren 2	14.76 km	(United Kingdom) Guy Wilks	8:11.2	108.18 km/h	(Belgium) Freddy Loix
Leg 2 (25 June)	SS15	18:49	Watou 2	12.33 km	(Norway) Andreas Mikkelsen	6:53.4	107.37 km/h	(Belgium) Freddy Loix
Leg 2 (25 June)	SS16	19:25	Heuvelland 2	24.74 km	(Norway) Andreas Mikkelsen	13:14.4	112.11 km/h	(Belgium) Freddy Loix
Leg 2 (25 June)	SS17	21:12	Hollebeke 2	28.82 km	(Norway) Andreas Mikkelsen	16:19.5	105.92 km/h	(Belgium) Freddy Loix
Leg 2 (25 June)	SS18	21:56	Kemmelberg 2	10.23 km	(United Kingdom) Guy Wilks	6:08.1	100.05 km/h	(Belgium) Freddy Loix
