= 2010 Monte Carlo Rally =

Motor rally competition

2010 Monte Carlo Rally 78ème Rallye Automobile de Monte-Carlo
Round 1 of the 2010 Intercontinental Rally Challenge season
Next event →
- Host country: Monaco
- Rally base: Monte Carlo
- Dates run: January 19 – 23 2010
- Stage surface: Tarmac and Ice

Statistics
- Crews: 63 at start, 36 at finish

Overall results
- Overall winner: (Finland) Mikko Hirvonen (United Kingdom) M-Sport Ltd.

The 2010 Monte-Carlo Rally, officially 78ème Rallye Automobile de Monte-Carlo, was the first round of the 2010 Intercontinental Rally Challenge (IRC) season. The rally took place over January 19–23, 2010.

== Introduction ==
The rally started in Valence on Tuesday 19 January covering 1,668 km (1,036 mi) including 405 km (252 mi) on fifteen special stages. New to the IRC Championship, a 9 km (5.6 mi) prologue was held on Tuesday evening to determine the starting order for Wednesday's stages. Stages were run both during the day and at night and included the famous Col de Turini.

Entrants for the event included the current IRC Champion Kris Meeke who was seeded at number 1, Formula One driver Robert Kubica, WRC stars Mikko Hirvonen and Toni Gardemeister and Rally Scotland winner Guy Wilks. The event saw the debut of the Ford Fiesta S2000 rally car. A total of 63 crews entered the rally including nineteen S2000 cars.

== Results ==
Finn Mikko Hirvonen driving the Ford Fiesta in competition for the first time and making his debut in the IRC, led the event from start to finish.

=== Overall ===
Pos.	Driver	Co-driver	Car	Time	Difference	Points
1.	(Finland) Mikko Hirvonen	(Finland) Jarmo Lehtinen	Ford Fiesta S2000	4:32:58.5	0.0	10
2.	(Finland) Juho Hänninen	(Finland) Mikko Markkula	Škoda Fabia S2000	4:34:49.9	1:51.4	8
3.	(France) Nicolas Vouilloz	(France) Benjamin Veillas	Škoda Fabia S2000	4:36:17.6	3:19.1	6
4.	(France) Stéphane Sarrazin	(France) Jacques-Julien Renucci	Peugeot 207 S2000	4:40:24.0	7:25.5	5
5.	(Czech Republic) Jan Kopecký	(Czech Republic) Petr Starý	Škoda Fabia S2000	4:41:47.2	8:48.7	4
6.	(United Kingdom) Guy Wilks	(United Kingdom) Phil Pugh	Škoda Fabia S2000	4:42:23.0	9:24.5	3
7.	(Portugal) Bruno Magalhães	(Portugal) Carlos Magalhães	Peugeot 207 S2000	4:42:43.9	9:45.4	2
8.	(France) Jean-Sébastien Vigion	(Belgium) Stéphane Prevot	Peugeot 207 S2000	4:46:32.0	13:33.5	1

=== Special stages ===
Day	Stage	Time	Name	Length	Winner	Time	Avg. spd.	Rally leader
Prologue (19 Jan)	SSS	18:38	Lente – Col de Gaudissart	8.83 km	(Finland) Toni Gardemeister	6:54:2	76.75 km/h	none*
Leg 1 (20 Jan)	SS1	11:51	Burzet – Lachamp-Raphaël	27.27 km	(Finland) Mikko Hirvonen	16:01.4	102.11 km/h	(Finland) Mikko Hirvonen
Leg 1 (20 Jan)	SS2	12:59	St-Pierreville – Antraigues	45.17 km	(France) Sébastien Ogier	30:54.2	87.70 km/h	(Finland) Mikko Hirvonen
Leg 1 (20 Jan)	SS3	15:02	Burzet – Lachamp-Raphaël	27.27 km	(Finland) Mikko Hirvonen	15:49.7	103.37 km/h	(Finland) Mikko Hirvonen
Leg 1 (20 Jan)	SS4	16:10	St-Pierreville – Antraigues	45.17 km	(France) Sébastien Ogier	30:45.9	88.09 km/h	(Finland) Mikko Hirvonen
Leg 2 (21 Jan)	SS5	10:13	Labatie d'Andaure – St-Pierre sur Doux	25.30 km	(France) Nicolas Vouilloz	17:38.5	86.05 km/h	(Finland) Mikko Hirvonen
Leg 2 (21 Jan)	SS6	10:55	St-Bonnet-le-Froid – St-Julien-Molhesabate – St-Bonnet-le-Froid	25.67 km	(France) Sébastien Ogier	17:19.7	88.88 km/h	(Finland) Mikko Hirvonen
Leg 2 (21 Jan)	SS7	12:20	Lamastre – Gilhoc – Alboussière	21.92 km	(Finland) Mikko Hirvonen	14:43.0	89.37 km/h	(Finland) Mikko Hirvonen
Leg 2 (21 Jan)	SS8	15:28	Labatie d'Andaure – St-Pierre sur Doux	25.30 km	(Finland) Juho Hänninen	16:36.8	91.37 km/h	(Finland) Mikko Hirvonen
Leg 2 (21 Jan)	SS9	16:10	St-Bonnet-le-Froid – St-Julien-Molhesabate – St-Bonnet-le-Froid	25.67 km	(France) Sébastien Ogier	15:51.1	97.16 km/h	(Finland) Mikko Hirvonen
Leg 2 (21 Jan)	SS10	18:05	Lamastre – Gilhoc – Alboussière	21.92 km	(France) Sébastien Ogier	15:03.0	87.39 km/h	(Finland) Mikko Hirvonen
Leg 3 (22 Jan)	SS11	09:23	Montauban sur l'Ouvèze – Eygalayes	30.42 km	(France) Sébastien Ogier	23:18.5	78.31 km/h	(Finland) Mikko Hirvonen
Leg 3 (22 Jan)	SS12	19:15	Peïra-Cava – La Bollène-Vésubie	18.42 km	(France) Sébastien Ogier	13:23.4	82.54 km/h	(Finland) Mikko Hirvonen
Leg 3 (22 Jan)	SS13	19:48	Lantosque – Lucéram	19.13 km	(France) Stéphane Sarrazin	14:12.9	80.75 km/h	(Finland) Mikko Hirvonen
Leg 3 (22 Jan)	SS14	23:20	Peïra-Cava – La Bollène-Vésubie	18.42 km	(Finland) Juho Hänninen	13:52.3	79.67 km/h	(Finland) Mikko Hirvonen
Leg 3 (22 Jan)	SS15	23:53	Lantosque – Lucéram	19.13 km	(France) Stéphane Sarrazin	14:40.2	78.24 km/h	(Finland) Mikko Hirvonen

- * The super-special set the running order for the first leg with the top ten running in reverse order from where they finished.
