= 2011 Rally Scotland =

Motor rally competition

2011 Rally Scotland RAC MSA Rally of Scotland
Round 10 of the 2011 Intercontinental Rally Challenge season
← Previous event	Next event →
- Host country: United Kingdom
- Rally base: Perth, Scotland
- Dates run: 7 – 9 October 2011
- Stages: 15 (196.96 km; 122.39 miles)
- Stage surface: Gravel
- Overall distance: 1,021.31 km (634.61 miles)

Statistics
- Crews: 37 at start, 22 at finish

Overall results
- Overall winner: (Norway) Andreas Mikkelsen (United Kingdom) Škoda UK

The 2011 Rally Scotland, officially the RAC MSA Rally of Scotland, was the tenth round of the 2011 Intercontinental Rally Challenge (IRC) season. The fifteen stage gravel rally took place over 7–9 October 2011 with three stages run after sunset.

The rally offered points-and-a-half towards the respective IRC championships, meaning that the overall rally winner, as well as class winners, gained 37.5 points instead of the usual 25.

== Introduction ==
The rally, which was run for the third time, was based in Perth, with a ceremonial start held at Stirling Castle on the Friday. Two runs of the Carron Valley stage completed the timetable for Friday. On Saturday six stages covering 94.76 km (58.88 mi) were run on gravel with the final seven stages, consisting of 85.48 km (53.11 mi) being completed on the Sunday.

== Results ==
Andreas Mikkelsen took his first IRC victory on the event, becoming the youngest driver to win in the championship, having taken the lead on the second leg after an error by Guy Wilks.

=== Overall ===
Pos.	Driver	Co-driver	Car	Time	Difference	Points
1.	(Norway) Andreas Mikkelsen	(Norway) Ola Fløene	Škoda Fabia S2000	1:55:17.2	0.0	37.5
2.	(Finland) Juho Hänninen	(Finland) Mikko Markkula	Škoda Fabia S2000	1:55:43.6	26.4	27
3.	(France) Bryan Bouffier	(France) Xavier Panseri	Peugeot 207 S2000	1:56:52.5	1:35.3	22.5
4.	(Republic of Ireland) Craig Breen	(United Kingdom) Gareth Roberts	Ford Fiesta S2000	1:57:22.3	2:05.1	18
5.	(Czech Republic) Jan Kopecký	(Czech Republic) Petr Starý	Škoda Fabia S2000	1:57:28.9	2:11.7	15
6.	(Belgium) Thierry Neuville	(Belgium) Nicolas Gilsoul	Peugeot 207 S2000	1:58:27.6	3:10.4	12
7.	(Finland) Toni Gardemeister	(Finland) Tapio Suominen	Škoda Fabia S2000	1:58:28.7	3:11.5	9
8.	(United Kingdom) Alastair Fisher	(United Kingdom) Daniel Baritt	Ford Fiesta S2000	2:00:17.1	4:59.9	6
9.	(Japan) Toshi Arai	(Australia) Dale Moscatt	Subaru Impreza R4	2:03:34.8	8:17.6	3
10.	(Germany) Matthias Kahle	(Germany) Peter Göbel	Škoda Fabia S2000	2:04:53.3	9:36.1	1.5

=== Special stages ===
Day	Stage	Time	Name	Length	Winner	Time	Avg. spd.	Rally leader
Leg 1 (7 October)	SS1	19:45	Carron Valley 1	8.36 km	(United Kingdom) Guy Wilks	5:24.8	92.66 km/h	(United Kingdom) Guy Wilks
Leg 1 (7 October)	SS2	20:10	Carron Valley 2	8.36 km	(United Kingdom) Guy Wilks	5:21.9	93.49 km/h	(United Kingdom) Guy Wilks
Leg 2 (8 October)	SS3	9:20	Craigvinean 1	16.54 km	(Norway) Andreas Mikkelsen	9:38.2	102.98 km/h	(United Kingdom) Guy Wilks
Leg 2 (8 October)	SS4	10:45	Drummond Hill 1	13.16 km	(France) Bryan Bouffier	8:15.3	95.65 km/h	(Norway) Andreas Mikkelsen
Leg 2 (8 October)	SS5	12:10	Errochty 1	17.68 km	(Norway) Andreas Mikkelsen	10:02.9	105.57 km/h	(Norway) Andreas Mikkelsen
Leg 2 (8 October)	SS6	16:15	Craigvinean 2	16.54 km	(Norway) Andreas Mikkelsen	9:50.4	100.85 km/h	(Norway) Andreas Mikkelsen
Leg 2 (8 October)	SS7	17:40	Errochty 2	17.68 km	(Norway) Andreas Mikkelsen	10:12.4	103.93 km/h	(Norway) Andreas Mikkelsen
Leg 2 (8 October)	SS8	18:52	Drummond Hill 2	13.16 km	stage cancelled			(Norway) Andreas Mikkelsen
Leg 3 (9 October)	SS9	9:08	Carron Valley 3	8.36 km	(Finland) Juho Hänninen	5:12.2	96.40 km/h	(Norway) Andreas Mikkelsen
Leg 3 (9 October)	SS10	10:52	Loch Chon 1	9.91 km	(Sweden) Patrik Sandell	6:41.5	88.86 km/h	(Norway) Andreas Mikkelsen
Leg 3 (9 October)	SS11	11:10	High Corrie 1	25.81 km	(Finland) Juho Hänninen	16:34.2	93.46 km/h	(Norway) Andreas Mikkelsen
Leg 3 (9 October)	SS12	13:37	Loch Chon 2	9.91 km	(Norway) Andreas Mikkelsen	6:33.3	90.71 km/h	(Norway) Andreas Mikkelsen
Leg 3 (9 October)	SS13	13:55	High Corrie 2	25.81 km	(Finland) Juho Hänninen	16:47.7	92.21 km/h	(Norway) Andreas Mikkelsen
Leg 3 (9 October)	SS14	17:00	Scone Palace 1	2.84 km	(Belgium) Thierry Neuville	1:57.7	86.86 km/h	(Norway) Andreas Mikkelsen
Leg 3 (9 October)	SS15	17:19	Scone Palace 2	2.84 km	(Belgium) Thierry Neuville	1:59.4	85.63 km/h	(Norway) Andreas Mikkelsen
