= 2011 Mecsek Rallye =

Motor rally competition

2011 Mecsek Rallye Canon 45. Mecsek Rallye
Round 8 of the 2011 Intercontinental Rally Challenge season
← Previous event	Next event →
- Host country: Hungary
- Rally base: Pécs
- Dates run: 10 – 11 September 2011
- Stages: 14 (251.86 km; 156.50 miles)
- Stage surface: Asphalt
- Overall distance: 825.24 km (512.78 miles)

Statistics
- Crews: 47 at start, 31 at finish

Overall results
- Overall winner: (Czech Republic) Jan Kopecký (Czech Republic) Škoda Motorsport

The 2011 Mecsek Rallye, officially Canon 45. Mecsek Rallye, was the eighth round of the 2011 Intercontinental Rally Challenge (IRC) season. The fourteen stage asphalt rally – held as a round of the Intercontinental Rally Challenge for the first time – took place over 10–11 September 2011 with all stages held in daylight.

== Introduction ==
The rally, which was run for the 45th time, was based in the Mecsek mountain city of Pécs, in the Baranya County of Hungary. The opening events took place on 9 September, starting in Széchenyi square, in the old town of Pécs with a special musical performance, composed by Tibor Bogányi, the conductor of the Pannon Philharmonic Orchestra, for brass winds and car horns. Following the short concert the racers drove from the square to the Pécs Plaza, where the ceremonial start was held and the rally was officially opened by Csaba Nagy, deputy mayor of Pécs, Erik Bánki, president of the Tourist and Sports Committee of the Parliament and Zsolt Gyulay, head of the National Automobilesport Federation of Hungary. The prologue was staged in the late afternoon on a 1.2 km (0.75 mi) track and was won by local driver Dávid Botka ahead of Bruno Magalhães.

The rally began the next day; initially eight asphalt stages covering 144.46 km (89.76 mi) were scheduled for Saturday, however, due to safety reasons the final stage of the day was cancelled. The closing six stages, consisting of 107.40 km (66.74 mi) were completed on Sunday.

== Results ==
Andreas Mikkelsen led the rally from start, but was forced to retire on the penultimate stage after he hit a log, with Jan Kopecký taking the lead and held on to take took his second consecutive IRC victory on the rally, by just 0.8 seconds ahead of Thierry Neuville, in the closest finish in Intercontinental Rally Challenge history.

=== Overall ===
Pos.	Driver	Co-driver	Car	Time	Difference	Points
1.	(Czech Republic) Jan Kopecký	(Czech Republic) Petr Starý	Škoda Fabia S2000	2:00:06.7	0.0	25
2.	(Belgium) Thierry Neuville	(Belgium) Nicolas Gilsoul	Peugeot 207 S2000	2:00:07.5	0.8	18
3.	(Belgium) Freddy Loix	(Belgium) Frédéric Miclotte	Škoda Fabia S2000	2:01:06.7	1:00.0	15
4.	(France) Bryan Bouffier	(France) Xavier Panseri	Peugeot 207 S2000	2:01:42.3	1:35.6	12
5.	(Germany) Hermann Gassner	(Germany) Timo Gottschalk	Škoda Fabia S2000	2:02:39.2	2:32.5	10
6.	(Hungary) György Aschenbrenner	(Hungary) Zsuzsa Pikó	Mitsubishi Lancer Evolution IX	2:02:44.9	2:38.2	8
7.	(Finland) Toni Gardemeister	(Finland) Tapio Suominen	Škoda Fabia S2000	2:03:12.3	3:05.6	6
8.	(Hungary) Róbert Bútor	(Hungary) Igor Bacigál	Peugeot 207 S2000	2:03:23.5	3:16.8	4
9.	(Portugal) Bruno Magalhães	(Portugal) Paulo Grave	Peugeot 207 S2000	2:03:58.4	3:51.7	2
10.	(Austria) Beppo Harrach	(Austria) Andreas Schindlbacher	Mitsubishi Lancer Evolution IX	2:04:20.7	4:14.0	1

=== Special stages ===
Day	Stage	Time	Name	Length	Winner	Time	Avg. spd.	Rally leader
Leg 1 (10 September)	SS1	9:08	Hetvehely 1	18.21 km	(Norway) Andreas Mikkelsen	8:50.2	123.64 km/h	(Norway) Andreas Mikkelsen
Leg 1 (10 September)	SS2	10:06	Orfű 1	28.00 km	(Norway) Andreas Mikkelsen	14:16.4	117.70 km/h	(Norway) Andreas Mikkelsen
Leg 1 (10 September)	SS3	12:34	Pécsvárad 1	12.00 km	(Czech Republic) Jan Kopecký	6:46.0	106.40 km/h	(Norway) Andreas Mikkelsen
Leg 1 (10 September)	SS4	13:37	Alsómocsolád 1	14.02 km	(Norway) Andreas Mikkelsen	6:53.2	122.15 km/h	(Norway) Andreas Mikkelsen
Leg 1 (10 September)	SS5	16:10	Hetvehely 2	18.21 km	(Czech Republic) Jan Kopecký	8:47.6	124.25 km/h	(Norway) Andreas Mikkelsen
Leg 1 (10 September)	SS6	17:08	Orfű 2	28.00 km	(Czech Republic) Jan Kopecký	14:10.5	118.52 km/h	(Norway) Andreas Mikkelsen
Leg 1 (10 September)	SS7	19:36	Pécsvárad 2	12.00 km	(Czech Republic) Jan Kopecký	6:49.1	105.60 km/h	(Norway) Andreas Mikkelsen
Leg 1 (10 September)	SS8	20:39	Alsómocsolád 2	14.02 km	stage cancelled			(Norway) Andreas Mikkelsen
Leg 2 (11 September)	SS9	9:08	Zobák 1	12.00 km	(Norway) Andreas Mikkelsen	6:51.2	105.06 km/h	(Norway) Andreas Mikkelsen
Leg 2 (11 September)	SS10	9:51	Árpádtető 1	24.00 km	(Czech Republic) Jan Kopecký (Norway) Andreas Mikkelsen	11:09.8	128.99 km/h	(Norway) Andreas Mikkelsen
Leg 2 (11 September)	SS11	10:44	Nyárásvölgy 1	17.70 km	(Belgium) Thierry Neuville	8:29.9	124.97 km/h	(Norway) Andreas Mikkelsen
Leg 2 (11 September)	SS12	13:17	Zobák 2	12.00 km	(Belgium) Thierry Neuville	6:48.4	105.78 km/h	(Norway) Andreas Mikkelsen
Leg 2 (11 September)	SS13	14:00	Árpádtető 2	24.00 km	(Belgium) Thierry Neuville	11:06.4	129.65 km/h	(Czech Republic) Jan Kopecký
Leg 2 (11 September)	SS14	14:53	Nyárásvölgy 2	17.70 km	(Belgium) Thierry Neuville	8:26.4	125.83 km/h	(Czech Republic) Jan Kopecký
