= 2011 Rallye Açores =

Motor rally competition

2011 Sata Rally Azores 46º Sata Rallye Açores
Round 6 of the 2011 Intercontinental Rally Challenge season
← Previous event	Next event →
- Host country: Portugal
- Rally base: Ponta Delgada, São Miguel, Azores
- Dates run: July 14 – 16 2011
- Stages: 17 (205.09 km; 127.44 miles)
- Stage surface: Gravel
- Overall distance: 743.61 km (462.06 miles)

Statistics
- Crews: 41 at start, 18 at finish

Overall results
- Overall winner: (Finland) Juho Hänninen (Czech Republic) Škoda Motorsport

The 2011 Sata Rally Azores, officially 46º Sata Rallye Açores, was the sixth round of the 2011 Intercontinental Rally Challenge (IRC) season. The 17-stage gravel rally took place on the island of São Miguel in the Azores between 14 and 16 July 2011.

== Introduction ==
The rally was based in the major city of Ponta Delgada. Day one consisted of three stages covering a total of 22.56 km (14.02 mi). Day two covered a total of 95.05 km (59.06 mi) over nine stages with the remaining five stages, covering 87.48 km (54.36 mi) completed on day three.

== Results ==
Juho Hänninen won his third IRC rally of the season, having led the rally for most of the running, before Andreas Mikkelsen made a late charge for the lead. Hänninen held an advantage into the final day and after Mikkelsen took the lead for a period, Hänninen regained the lead for the final time. His victory gave him the championship lead by four points ahead of Bryan Bouffier. Bouffier finished the rally in fourth position, behind Mikkelsen and Jan Kopecký.

=== Overall ===
Pos.	Driver	Co-driver	Car	Time	Difference	Points
1.	(Finland) Juho Hänninen	(Finland) Mikko Markkula	Škoda Fabia S2000	2:19:03.8	0.0	25
2.	(Norway) Andreas Mikkelsen	(Norway) Ola Fløene	Škoda Fabia S2000	2:19:46.1	42.3	18
3.	(Czech Republic) Jan Kopecký	(Czech Republic) Petr Starý	Škoda Fabia S2000	2:20:49.8	1:46.0	15
4.	(France) Bryan Bouffier	(France) Xavier Panseri	Peugeot 207 S2000	2:22:40.0	3:36.2	12
5.	(Sweden) Patrik Sandell	(Sweden) Staffan Parmander	Škoda Fabia S2000	2:23:37.1	4:33.3	10
6.	(Portugal) Ricardo Moura	(Portugal) Sancho Eiró	Mitsubishi Lancer Evolution IX	2:25:10.8	6:07.0	8
7.	(Portugal) Vítor Lopes	(Portugal) Hugo Magalhães	Subaru Impreza WRX STI	2:28:55.9	9:52.1	6
8.	(Portugal) Vítor Pascoal	(Portugal) Luis Ramalho	Mitsubishi Lancer Evolution X	2:31:51.1	12:47.3	4
9.	(Portugal) Sérgio Silva	(Portugal) Nelson Cordeiro	Subaru Impreza WRX STI	2:33:04.1	14:00.3	2
10.	(Portugal) Paulo Maciel	(Portugal) Filipe Gouveira	Citroën Saxo VTS	2:37:14.5	18:10.7	1

=== Special stages ===
Day	Stage	Time	Name	Length	Winner	Time	Avg. spd.	Rally leader
Leg 1 (14 July)	SS1	16:45	Lagoa – Marques 1	13.06 km	(Norway) Andreas Mikkelsen	8:41.9	90.09 km/h	(Norway) Andreas Mikkelsen
Leg 1 (14 July)	SS2	17:24	Coroa da Mata 1	7.50 km	(Portugal) Bruno Magalhães	6:25.3	70.08 km/h	(Finland) Juho Hänninen
Leg 1 (14 July)	SS3	18:00	Grupo Marques 1	2.00 km	(Finland) Juho Hänninen	1:57.4	61.33 km/h	(Finland) Juho Hänninen
Leg 2 (15 July)	SS4	10:08	Batalha Golfe 1	7.90 km	(Finland) Juho Hänninen	5:40.2	83.60 km/h	(Finland) Juho Hänninen
Leg 2 (15 July)	SS5	10:43	Feteiras 1	7.47 km	stage cancelled			(Finland) Juho Hänninen
Leg 2 (15 July)	SS6	11:08	Sete Cidades 1	18.30 km	(Finland) Juho Hänninen	13:46.3	79.73 km/h	(Finland) Juho Hänninen
Leg 2 (15 July)	SS7	13:02	Batalha Golfe 2	7.90 km	(Norway) Andreas Mikkelsen	5:32.3	85.59 km/h	(Finland) Juho Hänninen
Leg 2 (15 July)	SS8	13:37	Feteiras 2	7.47 km	(Finland) Juho Hänninen	5:48.7	77.12 km/h	(Finland) Juho Hänninen
Leg 2 (15 July)	SS9	14:02	Sete Cidades 2	18.30 km	stage cancelled			(Finland) Juho Hänninen
Leg 2 (15 July)	SS10	16:02	Remédios – Água de Pau	7.15 km	(Norway) Andreas Mikkelsen	4:56.8	86.73 km/h	(Finland) Juho Hänninen
Leg 2 (15 July)	SS11	16:25	Lagoa – Marques 2	13.06 km	(Norway) Andreas Mikkelsen	8:29.6	92.26 km/h	(Finland) Juho Hänninen
Leg 2 (15 July)	SS12	17:04	Coroa da Mata 2	7.50 km	(Norway) Andreas Mikkelsen	6:14.3	72.13 km/h	(Finland) Juho Hänninen
Leg 3 (16 July)	SS13	10:27	Graminhais 1	20.80 km	(Czech Republic) Jan Kopecký	15:45.0	79.24 km/h	(Norway) Andreas Mikkelsen
Leg 3 (16 July)	SS14	11:25	Tronqueira 1	21.94 km	(Finland) Juho Hänninen	18:33.7	70.92 km/h	(Finland) Juho Hänninen
Leg 3 (16 July)	SS15	12:57	Grupo Marques 2	2.00 km	(Norway) Andreas Mikkelsen	1:59.4	60.30 km/h	(Finland) Juho Hänninen
Leg 3 (16 July)	SS16	15:26	Graminhais 2	20.80 km	(Finland) Juho Hänninen	15:54.9	78.42 km/h	(Finland) Juho Hänninen
Leg 3 (16 July)	SS17	16:24	Tronqueira 2	21.94 km	(Sweden) Patrik Sandell	18:58.4	69.38 km/h	(Finland) Juho Hänninen
