= 2011 Tour de Corse =

Motor rally competition

2011 Tour de Corse 54ème Tour de Corse-E.Leclerc
Round 3 of the 2011 Intercontinental Rally Challenge season
← Previous event	Next event →
- Host country: France
- Rally base: Ajaccio, Corsica
- Dates run: 12 – 14 May 2011
- Stages: 14 (320.84 km; 199.36 miles)
- Stage surface: Asphalt
- Overall distance: 1,161.95 km (722.00 miles)

Statistics
- Crews: 48 at start, 31 at finish

Overall results
- Overall winner: (Belgium) Thierry Neuville (Belgium) Peugeot Team Belux

The 2011 Tour de Corse, was the third round of the 2011 Intercontinental Rally Challenge (IRC) season. The fourteen stage asphalt rally took place on the island of Corsica between 12 and 14 May 2011.

== Introduction ==
The rally was based in the capital, Ajaccio, with day one consisting of two runs through the 27.53 kilometres (17.11 miles) Le Fangu stage. The remaining two days were made up of six stages on each day, covering 127.34 kilometres (79.13 miles) on day two, and 138.44 kilometres (86.02 miles) on day three. A total of 48 cars contested the event, with Bryan Bouffier seeded number one.

== Results ==
Thierry Neuville took his first IRC victory and became the season's third different winner after controlling the event for almost the entire rally, only being headed in one stage by Bryan Bouffier. Jan Kopecký finished second for the second consecutive event while Freddy Loix took the championship lead with third place.

=== Overall ===
Pos.	Driver	Co-driver	Car	Time	Difference	Points
1.	(Belgium) Thierry Neuville	(Belgium) Nicolas Gilsoul	Peugeot 207 S2000	3:20:51.0	0.0	25
2.	(Czech Republic) Jan Kopecký	(Czech Republic) Petr Starý	Škoda Fabia S2000	3:21:06.5	15.5	18
3.	(Belgium) Freddy Loix	(Belgium) Frédéric Miclotte	Škoda Fabia S2000	3:21:53.6	1:02.6	15
4.	(France) Pierre Campana	(France) Sabrina De Castelli	Peugeot 207 S2000	3:24:50.1	3:59.1	12
5.	(Portugal) Bruno Magalhães	(Portugal) Paulo Grave	Peugeot 207 S2000	3:25:19.2	4:28.2	10
6.	(Norway) Andreas Mikkelsen	(Norway) Ola Fløene	Škoda Fabia S2000	3:25:21.1	4:30.1	8
7.	(France) Julien Maurin	(France) Olivier Ural	Ford Fiesta S2000	3:25:24.3	4:33.3	6
8.	(Finland) Toni Gardemeister	(Finland) Tapio Suominen	Škoda Fabia S2000	3:27:24.3	6:33.3	4
9.	(Sweden) Patrik Sandell	(Sweden) Staffan Parmander	Škoda Fabia S2000	3:29:19.8	8:28.8	2
10.	(France) Jean-Mathieu Leandri	(France) Pierre-Marien Leonardi	Peugeot 207 S2000	3:30:32.5	9:41.5	1

=== Special stages ===
Day	Stage	Time	Name	Length	Winner	Time	Avg. spd.	Rally leader
Leg 1 (12 May)	SS1	14:03	Le Fangu – Notre Dame de la Serra 1	27.53 km	(Belgium) Thierry Neuville	16:10.3	102.14 km/h	(Belgium) Thierry Neuville
Leg 1 (12 May)	SS2	16:56	Le Fangu – Notre Dame de la Serra 2	27.53 km	(Belgium) Thierry Neuville	15:57.7	103.49 km/h	(Belgium) Thierry Neuville
Leg 2 (13 May)	SS3	9:10	Erbajolo – Pont d'Altiani 1	25.15 km	(United Kingdom) Guy Wilks	15:10.1	99.48 km/h	(Belgium) Thierry Neuville
Leg 2 (13 May)	SS4	10:58	Barchetta – La Porta 1	23.24 km	(France) Bryan Bouffier	15:32.8	89.69 km/h	(France) Bryan Bouffier
Leg 2 (13 May)	SS5	12:06	Taverna – Pont de Castirla 1	15.28 km	(Belgium) Thierry Neuville	9:09.8	100.05 km/h	(Belgium) Thierry Neuville
Leg 2 (13 May)	SS6	15:09	Barchetta – La Porta 2	23.24 km	stage cancelled			(Belgium) Thierry Neuville
Leg 2 (13 May)	SS7	16:17	Taverna – Pont de Castirla 2	15.28 km	(Belgium) Thierry Neuville	9:07.6	100.45 km/h	(Belgium) Thierry Neuville
Leg 2 (13 May)	SS8	17:40	Erbajolo – Pont d'Altiani 2	25.15 km	(Belgium) Thierry Neuville	15:06.6	99.87 km/h	(Belgium) Thierry Neuville
Leg 3 (14 May)	SS9	9:10	Sarrola – Plage du Liamone 1	26.70 km	(Czech Republic) Jan Kopecký	17:29.4	91.60 km/h	(Belgium) Thierry Neuville
Leg 3 (14 May)	SS10	10:43	Marato – Acqua Doria 1	22.47 km	(Belgium) Thierry Neuville	13:15.6	101.67 km/h	(Belgium) Thierry Neuville
Leg 3 (14 May)	SS11	13:47	Bocognano – Bastelica 1	20.05 km	(Belgium) Thierry Neuville	13:24.7	89.70 km/h	(Belgium) Thierry Neuville
Leg 3 (14 May)	SS12	15:10	Marato – Acqua Doria 2	22.47 km	(Belgium) Thierry Neuville	13:13.3	101.97 km/h	(Belgium) Thierry Neuville
Leg 3 (14 May)	SS13	18:48	Bocognano – Bastelica 2	20.05 km	(Czech Republic) Jan Kopecký	13:19.2	90.32 km/h	(Belgium) Thierry Neuville
Leg 3 (14 May)	SS14	20:10	Sarrola – Plage du Liamone 2	26.70 km	(Norway) Andreas Mikkelsen	17:30.4	91.51 km/h	(Belgium) Thierry Neuville
