= Burcu Çetinkaya =

Personal information
- Nationality: Turkish
- Born: 19 March 1981 (age 45); Istanbul, Turkey

World Rally Championship record
- Years active: 2006–present
- Teams: Ford, Peugeot, Red Bull Škoda, Twister Corse
- Rallies: 14
- Championships: 0
- Rally wins: 0
- Podiums: 0
- Stage wins: 0
- Total points: 0
- First rally: 2006 Rally of Turkey

Burcu Çetinkaya (born 19 March 1981) is a Turkish rally driver and television presenter.

Çetinkaya was educated in Robert College between 1992 and 1999. During this time, she played basketball. After two years spent at Babson College in Boston, USA, she returned to Turkey to continue her education in economics at the Koç University and graduated in 2005.

In 2003, Çetinkaya earned the gold medal in the parallel giant slalom and giant slalom events at the Turkish Women's Snowboard Championships.

== Auto racing career ==
Çetinkaya debuted in auto racing with Hittite Rally in 2005. The same year, she won the Istanbul Ladies Rally Championship as a VW Polo Ladies Cup pilot. At the 2006 Rally of Turkey, she participated in her first World Rally Championship event.

Çetinkaya was the winner of the Castrol Fiesta Sporting Trophy in 2008.

In 2012, Çetinkaya became the runner-up in the Qatar National Rally Championship.

== Personal life ==
In 2015, Çetinkaya married Fatih Mehmet Bucak. They have one son. They divorced in 2019.

== See also ==
- List of female World Rally Championship drivers
