= 2011 Barum Czech Rally Zlín =

Motor rally competition

Round 7 of the 2011 Intercontinental Rally Challenge season
← Previous event	Next event →
- Czech Rally Logo
- Host country: Czech Republic
- Rally base: Zlín
- Dates run: 26 – 28 August 2011
- Stages: 15 (248.48 km; 154.40 miles)
- Stage surface: Asphalt
- Overall distance: 619.73 km (385.08 miles)

Statistics
- Crews: 112 at start, 77 at finish

Overall results
- Overall winner: (Czech Republic) Jan Kopecký (Czech Republic) Škoda Motorsport

The 2011 Barum Czech Rally Zlín was the seventh round of the 2011 Intercontinental Rally Challenge (IRC) season, and also a round of the European Rally Championship. The fifteen stage asphalt rally took place over 26–28 August 2011. Other than the opening stage on Friday night, all stages were run in daylight.

== Introduction ==
The rally, which was run for the 41st time, was based in the Moravian town of Zlín. Friday saw the ceremonial start and opening super-special stage running through the streets of Zlín. On Saturday a further eight stages covering 124.04 km (77.07 mi) were run on asphalt with the final six stages, consisting of 115.08 km (71.51 mi) being completed on the Sunday.

== Results ==
Jan Kopecký took his first win in the Intercontinental Rally Challenge for over a year, holding off Freddy Loix by just 1.2 seconds, the closest finish in series history.

=== Overall ===
Pos.	Driver	Co-driver	Car	Time	Difference	Points
1.	(Czech Republic) Jan Kopecký	(Czech Republic) Petr Starý	Škoda Fabia S2000	2:15:51.7	0.0	25
2.	(Belgium) Freddy Loix	(Belgium) Frédéric Miclotte	Škoda Fabia S2000	2:15:52.9	1.2	18
3.	(Finland) Juho Hänninen	(Finland) Mikko Markkula	Škoda Fabia S2000	2:16:29.1	37.4	15
4.	(Belgium) Thierry Neuville	(Belgium) Nicolas Gilsoul	Peugeot 207 S2000	2:17:51.3	1:59.5	12
5.	(Norway) Andreas Mikkelsen	(Norway) Ola Fløene	Škoda Fabia S2000	2:17:57.4	2:05.7	10
6.	(Finland) Toni Gardemeister	(Finland) Tapio Suominen	Škoda Fabia S2000	2:19:34.9	3:43.2	8
7.	(Republic of Ireland) Craig Breen	(United Kingdom) Gareth Roberts	Ford Fiesta S2000	2:19:39.1	3:47.4	6
8.	(Czech Republic) Roman Kresta	(Czech Republic) Petr Gross	Škoda Fabia S2000	2:20:13.2	4:21.5	4
9.	(Sweden) Per-Gunnar Andersson	(Sweden) Emil Axelsson	Proton Satria Neo S2000	2:20:32.8	4:41.0	2
10.	(Estonia) Karl Kruuda	(Estonia) Martin Järveoja	Škoda Fabia S2000	2:20:46.1	4:54.4	1

=== Special stages ===
Day	Stage	Time	Name	Length	Winner	Time	Avg. spd.	Rally leader
Leg 1 (26–27 August)	SS1	21:15	SSS Zlín	9.36 km	(Finland) Juho Hänninen	7:03.4	79.58 km/h	(Finland) Juho Hänninen
Leg 1 (26–27 August)	SS2	9:38	Biskupice 1	8.89 km	(United Kingdom) Guy Wilks	4:41.0	113.89 km/h	(Norway) Andreas Mikkelsen
Leg 1 (26–27 August)	SS3	10:11	Pindula 1	12.95 km	(Czech Republic) Jan Kopecký	6:41.5	116.11 km/h	(Czech Republic) Jan Kopecký
Leg 1 (26–27 August)	SS4	10:54	Troják 1	28.69 km	(Czech Republic) Jan Kopecký	15:49.0	108.83 km/h	(Czech Republic) Jan Kopecký
Leg 1 (26–27 August)	SS5	11:37	Semetín 1	11.49 km	(France) Bryan Bouffier	6:30.9	105.82 km/h	(Czech Republic) Jan Kopecký
Leg 1 (26–27 August)	SS6	15:00	Biskupice 2	8.89 km	(Belgium) Freddy Loix	4:39.5	114.50 km/h	(Czech Republic) Jan Kopecký
Leg 1 (26–27 August)	SS7	15:33	Pindula 2	12.95 km	(Finland) Juho Hänninen	6:37.2	117.37 km/h	(Czech Republic) Jan Kopecký
Leg 1 (26–27 August)	SS8	16:16	Troják 2	28.69 km	(Belgium) Freddy Loix (Czech Republic) Jan Kopecký	15:44.7	109.33 km/h	(Czech Republic) Jan Kopecký
Leg 1 (26–27 August)	SS9	16:59	Semetín 2	11.49 km	(Belgium) Freddy Loix	6:27.1	106.86 km/h	(Czech Republic) Jan Kopecký
Leg 2 (28 August)	SS10	8:33	Maják 1	22.69 km	(Norway) Andreas Mikkelsen	12:26.8	109.38 km/h	(Czech Republic) Jan Kopecký
Leg 2 (28 August)	SS11	9:21	Kudlovice 1	10.48 km	(Norway) Andreas Mikkelsen	5:28.2	114.95 km/h	(Czech Republic) Jan Kopecký
Leg 2 (28 August)	SS12	9:54	Halenkovice 1	24.37 km	(Belgium) Freddy Loix	12:51.5	113.72 km/h	(Czech Republic) Jan Kopecký
Leg 2 (28 August)	SS13	12:12	Maják 2	22.69 km	(Norway) Andreas Mikkelsen	12:11.6	111.65 km/h	(Czech Republic) Jan Kopecký
Leg 2 (28 August)	SS14	13:00	Kudlovice 2	10.48 km	(Norway) Andreas Mikkelsen	5:22.4	117.02 km/h	(Czech Republic) Jan Kopecký
Leg 2 (28 August)	SS15	13:33	Halenkovice 2	24.37 km	(Belgium) Freddy Loix	12:35.5	116.12 km/h	(Czech Republic) Jan Kopecký
