= 2011 Prime Yalta Rally =

Motor rally competition

Prime Yalta Rally 2011
Round 4 of the 2011 Intercontinental Rally Challenge season
← Previous event	Next event →
- Host country: Ukraine
- Rally base: Yalta
- Dates run: 02 – 4 June 2011
- Stages: 14 (261.87 km; 162.72 miles)
- Stage surface: Asphalt
- Overall distance: 459.74 km (285.67 miles)

Statistics
- Crews: 43 at start, 24 at finish

Overall results
- Overall winner: (Finland) Juho Hänninen (Czech Republic) Škoda Motorsport

The Prime Yalta Rally 2011, was the 4th round of the 2011 Intercontinental Rally Challenge (IRC) season. The fourteen stage asphalt rally took place over 2–4 June 2011.

== Introduction ==
Yalta was the base for the first ever visit of the IRC to Ukraine. The rally started with two short stages on the afternoon of Thursday 2 June prior to the ceremonial start on the Yalta waterfront. Fifteen of the top IRC competitors contested the rally, including Bryan Bouffier, Juho Hänninen, and Tour de Corse winner Thierry Neuville.

== Results ==
Juho Hänninen won his second IRC rally of the season, having taken the lead towards the end of the second day of the rally, and held an advantage all the way to the end. His victory gave him the championship lead by three points ahead of Jan Kopecký. Kopecký finished the rally in third position, behind Bryan Bouffier.

=== Overall ===
Pos.	Driver	Co-driver	Car	Time	Difference	Points
1.	(Finland) Juho Hänninen	(Finland) Mikko Markkula	Škoda Fabia S2000	2:54:14.0	0.0	25
2.	(France) Bryan Bouffier	(France) Xavier Panseri	Peugeot 207 S2000	2:54:25.7	11.7	18
3.	(Czech Republic) Jan Kopecký	(Czech Republic) Petr Starý	Škoda Fabia S2000	2:54:52.7	38.7	15
4.	(Norway) Andreas Mikkelsen	(Norway) Ola Fløene	Škoda Fabia S2000	2:55:11.3	57.3	12
5.	(United Kingdom) Guy Wilks	(United Kingdom) Phil Pugh	Peugeot 207 S2000	2:58:14.4	4:00.4	10
6.	(Belgium) Thierry Neuville	(Belgium) Nicolas Gilsoul	Peugeot 207 S2000	2:59:15.5	5:01.5	8
7.	(Finland) Toni Gardemeister	(Finland) Tapio Suominen	Škoda Fabia S2000	3:02:13.3	7:59.3	6
8.	(Estonia) Karl Kruuda	(Estonia) Martin Järveoja	Škoda Fabia S2000	3:04:15.3	10:01.3	4
9.	(Sweden) Patrik Sandell	(Sweden) Staffan Parmander	Škoda Fabia S2000	3:12:22.9	18:08.9	2
10.	(France) Jean-Michel Raoux	(France) Laurent Magat	Renault Clio R3	3:16:06.9	21:52.9	1

=== Special stages ===
Day	Stage	Time	Name	Length	Winner	Time	Avg. spd.	Rally leader
Leg 1 (2 June)	SS1	13:14	Yalta	2.12 km	(Belgium) Thierry Neuville	1:09.7	109.50 km/h	(Belgium) Thierry Neuville
Leg 1 (2 June)	SS2	13:47	Livadija	5.49 km	(United Kingdom) Guy Wilks	3:19.5	99.07 km/h	(Belgium) Thierry Neuville
Leg 2 (3 June)	SS3	8:44	Ai-Petri 1	17.26 km	(Belgium) Thierry Neuville	12:15.8	84.45 km/h	(Belgium) Thierry Neuville
Leg 2 (3 June)	SS4	9:12	Plato 1	22.55 km	(Belgium) Thierry Neuville	15:46.6	85.76 km/h	(Belgium) Thierry Neuville
Leg 2 (3 June)	SS5	10:55	Orlinoje 1	28.95 km	(Norway) Andreas Mikkelsen	18:23.2	94.47 km/h	(France) Bryan Bouffier
Leg 2 (3 June)	SS6	13:03	Ai-Petri 2	17.26 km	(Belgium) Thierry Neuville	12:06.5	85.53 km/h	(France) Bryan Bouffier
Leg 2 (3 June)	SS7	13:31	Plato 2	22.55 km	(Finland) Juho Hänninen	15:21.0	88.14 km/h	(Finland) Juho Hänninen
Leg 2 (3 June)	SS8	15:14	Orlinoje 2	28.95 km	(Finland) Juho Hänninen	17:59.2	96.57 km/h	(Finland) Juho Hänninen
Leg 3 (4 June)	SS9	8:07	Opolznevoje 1	18.95 km	(Norway) Andreas Mikkelsen	11:16.8	100.80 km/h	(Finland) Juho Hänninen
Leg 3 (4 June)	SS10	9:45	Sokolinoje 1	22.35 km	(Czech Republic) Jan Kopecký	15:09.0	88.51 km/h	(Finland) Juho Hänninen
Leg 3 (4 June)	SS11	10:13	Uchan-Su 1	10.13 km	(Norway) Andreas Mikkelsen	11:53.1	86.18 km/h	(Finland) Juho Hänninen
Leg 3 (4 June)	SS12	12:25	Opolznevoje 2	18.95 km	(Czech Republic) Jan Kopecký	11:06.2	102.40 km/h	(Finland) Juho Hänninen
Leg 3 (4 June)	SS13	14:03	Sokolinoje 2	22.35 km	(Czech Republic) Jan Kopecký	15:06.2	88.79 km/h	(Finland) Juho Hänninen
Leg 3 (4 June)	SS14	14:31	Uchan-Su 2	10.13 km	(France) Bryan Bouffier	11:50.4	86.50 km/h	(Finland) Juho Hänninen
