= 2011 Rallye Sanremo =

Motor rally competition

2011 Rallye Sanremo 52º Rallye Sanremo
Round 9 of the 2011 Intercontinental Rally Challenge season
← Previous event	Next event →
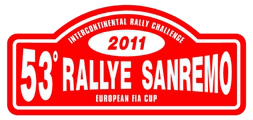
- Rallye Sanremo Logo
- Host country: Italy
- Rally base: Sanremo
- Dates run: 22 – 24 September 2011
- Stages: 13 (225.77 km; 140.29 miles)
- Stage surface: Asphalt
- Overall distance: 524.10 km (325.66 miles)

Statistics
- Crews: 57 at start, 44 at finish

Overall results
- Overall winner: (Belgium) Thierry Neuville (Belgium) Peugeot Team Belux

The 2011 Rallye Sanremo (53º Rallye Sanremo), was the 9th round of the 2011 Intercontinental Rally Challenge (IRC) season. The thirteen stage asphalt rally took place over 22 – 24 September 2011. The longest stage of the rally, Ronde, was run in darkness. All other stages were run in daylight.

== Introduction ==
The rally took place in the province of Imperia, with a total length of 524.10 km (325.66 mi) of which 225.77 km (140.29 mi) were special stages. The rally base was located along the sea front and the old railway station in the heart of the town of Sanremo. Fifteen S2000 cars started the event with the main front runners in the championship, excluding Juho Hänninen, taking part.

== Results ==
=== Overall ===
Pos.	Driver	Co-driver	Car	Time	Difference	Points
1.	(Belgium) Thierry Neuville	(Belgium) Nicolas Gilsoul	Peugeot 207 S2000	2:19:57.8	0.0	25
2.	(Norway) Andreas Mikkelsen	(Norway) Ola Fløene	Škoda Fabia S2000	2:19:59.3	1.5	18
3.	(France) Bryan Bouffier	(France) Xavier Panseri	Peugeot 207 S2000	2:20:13.8	16.0	15
4.	(Czech Republic) Jan Kopecký	(Czech Republic) Petr Starý	Škoda Fabia S2000	2:21:06.9	1:09.1	12
5.	(Portugal) Bruno Magalhães	(Portugal) Paulo Grave	Peugeot 207 S2000	2:21:23.8	1:26.0	10
6.	(Italy) Alessandro Perico	(Italy) Fabrizio Carrara	Peugeot 207 S2000	2:23:45.6	3:47.8	8
7.	(Italy) Umberto Scandola	(Italy) Guido D'Amore	Ford Fiesta S2000	2:24:03.7	4:05.9	6
8.	(France) Pierre Campana	(France) Sabrina De Castelli	Peugeot 207 S2000	2:24:25.8	4:28.0	4
9.	(Finland) Toni Gardemeister	(Finland) Tapio Suominen	Škoda Fabia S2000	2:25:21.9	5:24.1	2
10.	(Italy) Giandomenico Basso	(Italy) Mitia Dotta	Proton Satria Neo S2000	2:27:24.7	7:26.9	1

=== Special stages ===
Day	Stage	Time	Name	Length	Winner	Time	Avg. spd.	Rally leader
Leg 1 (23 September)	SS1	13:54	Coldirodi 1	13.06 km	(Norway) Andreas Mikkelsen	8:27.3	92.68 km/h	(Norway) Andreas Mikkelsen
Leg 1 (23 September)	SS2	14:33	Bajardo	7.36 km	(Belgium) Freddy Loix	5:18.7	83.14 km/h	(Norway) Andreas Mikkelsen
Leg 1 (23 September)	SS3	14:51	Bignone 1	10.59 km	(Belgium) Freddy Loix	6:51.5	92.65 km/h	(Norway) Andreas Mikkelsen
Leg 1 (23 September)	SS4	16:50	Coldirodi 2	13.06 km	(Norway) Andreas Mikkelsen	8:22.1	93.64 km/h	(Norway) Andreas Mikkelsen
Leg 1 (23 September)	SS5	17:12	Apricale	17.43 km	(Norway) Andreas Mikkelsen	12:19.4	84.86 km/h	(Norway) Andreas Mikkelsen
Leg 1 (23 September)	SS6	17:39	Bignone 2	10.59 km	(Belgium) Thierry Neuville (Norway) Andreas Mikkelsen	6:47.0	93.67 km/h	(Norway) Andreas Mikkelsen
Leg 1 (23 September)	SS7	22:33	Ronde	44.00 km	(Belgium) Freddy Loix	29:35.7	89.20 km/h	(Belgium) Freddy Loix
Leg 2 (24 September)	SS8	10:16	Colle Langan 1	20.57 km	(Belgium) Thierry Neuville	13:49.9	89.23 km/h	(Norway) Andreas Mikkelsen
Leg 2 (24 September)	SS9	10:53	Passo Teglia 1	18.80 km	(Belgium) Thierry Neuville	13:38.6	82.68 km/h	(Norway) Andreas Mikkelsen
Leg 2 (24 September)	SS10	12:02	Colle d'Oggia 1	15.47 km	(Belgium) Freddy Loix	10:27.8	88.71 km/h	(Belgium) Freddy Loix
Leg 2 (24 September)	SS11	15:16	Colle Langan 2	20.57 km	stage cancelled			(Norway) Andreas Mikkelsen
Leg 2 (24 September)	SS12	16:00	Passo Teglia 2	18.80 km	(Belgium) Thierry Neuville	13:33.1	83.24 km/h	(Belgium) Thierry Neuville
Leg 2 (24 September)	SS13	17:09	Colle d'Oggia 2	15.47 km	(Belgium) Thierry Neuville	10:21.3	89.64 km/h	(Belgium) Thierry Neuville
