= 2012 Circuit of Ireland =

Round 3 of the 2012 Intercontinental Rally Challenge season
← Previous event	Next event →
- Host country: (United Kingdom)
- Rally base: Armagh
- Dates run: 6 – 7 April 2012
- Stages: 15 (220.30 km; 136.89 miles)
- Stage surface: Tarmac
- Overall distance: 621.75 km (386.34 miles)

Statistics
- Crews: 39 at start

The 2012 Circuit of Ireland, officially the Donnelly Group Circuit of Ireland Rally was the third round of the 2012 Intercontinental Rally Challenge. The fifteen stage tarmac event took place between 6–7 April 2012 with two of the Friday stages taking place at night.

It was the first time the event had been included in the IRC calendar.

== Introduction ==
The rally was based in Armagh with the fifteen stages rally covering a total of 220.30 km (136.89 mi) primarily on closed public road. A super special stage started the event at the Titanic Quarter, Belfast on the Friday afternoon.

== Results ==
Pos.	Driver	Co-driver	Car	Time	Difference	Points
1.	(Finland) Juho Hänninen	(Finland) Mikko Markkula	Škoda Fabia S2000	1:58:21.8	0.0	25
2.	(Norway) Andreas Mikkelsen	(Norway) Ola Fløene	Škoda Fabia S2000	1:59:06.0	1:39.5	18
3.	(Czech Republic) Jan Kopecký	(Czech Republic) Pavel Dresler	Škoda Fabia S2000	2:00:01.3	1:39.5	15
4.	(France) Mathieu Arzeno	(Belgium) Renoul Jamoul	Peugeot 207 S2000	2:02:23.4	4:01.6	12
5.	(Republic of Ireland) Craig Breen	(United Kingdom) Gareth Roberts	Ford Fiesta S2000	2:03:15.6	4:53.8	10
6.	(Republic of Ireland) Robert Barrable	(Republic of Ireland) Damien Connolly	Škoda Fabia S2000	2:03:36.3	5:14.5	8
7.	(Germany) Sepp Wiegand	(Germany) Timo Gottschalk	Škoda Fabia S2000	2:04:37.7	6:15.9	6
8.	(United Kingdom) Garry Jennings	(Republic of Ireland) Barry McNulty	Mitsubishi Lancer Evolution IX	2:06:49.7	8:27.9	4
9.	(Republic of Ireland) Donagh Kelly	(Republic of Ireland) Kevin Flanagan	Mitsubishi Lancer Evolution IX	2:07:33.2	9:11.4	2
10.	(Republic of Ireland) Sam Moffett	(Republic of Ireland) James O'Reilly	Mitsubishi Lancer Evolution IX	2:07:37.8	9:16.0	1

== Special stages ==
Day	Stage	Time	Name	Length	Winner	Time	Avg. spd.	Rally leader
1 (6 April)	SS1	17:00	Titanic	1.80 km	(Czech Republic) Jan Kopecký	2:11.8	51.90 km/h	(Czech Republic) Jan Kopecký
1 (6 April)	SS2	18:30	Drummond 1	12.96 km	(Norway) Andreas Mikkelsen	8:14.6	94.84 km/h	(Norway) Andreas Mikkelsen
1 (6 April)	SS3	18:58	Legane 1	25.16 km	(Finland) Juho Hänninen	16:08.7	93.99 km/h	(Norway) Andreas Mikkelsen
1 (6 April)	SS4	21:25	Drummond 2	12.96 km	(Finland) Juho Hänninen	8:13.9	94.97 km/h	(Czech Republic) Jan Kopecký
1 (6 April)	SS5	21:53	Legane 2	25.16 km	stage cancelled			(Czech Republic) Jan Kopecký
2 (7 April)	SS6	09:07	Redrock 1	25.00 km	(Norway) Andreas Mikkelsen	13:50.2	108.93 km/h	(Norway) Andreas Mikkelsen
2 (7 April)	SS7	09:50	Drumhillery 1	14.24 km	(Finland) Juho Hänninen	96.04	km/h	(Finland) Juho Hänninen
2 (7 April)	SS8	10:26	Hollow 1	14.56 km	(Finland) Juho Hänninen	8:45.0	100.53 km/h	(Finland) Juho Hänninen
2 (7 April)	SS9	12:03	Redrock 2	25.00 km	(Norway) Andreas Mikkelsen	13:26.2	112.17 km/h	(Finland) Juho Hänninen
2 (7 April)	SS10	12:46	Drumhillery 2	14.24 km	(Finland) Juho Hänninen	8:48.1	97.62 km/h	(Finland) Juho Hänninen
2 (7 April)	SS11	13:22	Hollow 2	14.56 km	(Norway) Andreas Mikkelsen	8:29.8	103.52 km/h	(Finland) Juho Hänninen
2 (7 April)	SS12	16:00	Lisburn 1	1.06 km	(Finland) Juho Hänninen	0:57.9	64.04 km/h	(Finland) Juho Hänninen
2 (7 April)	SS13	16:15	Lisburn 2	1.06 km	(Finland) Juho Hänninen	0:57.9	64.04 km/h	(Finland) Juho Hänninen
2 (7 April)	SS14	16:53	Banbridge North	7.54 km	(Norway) Andreas Mikkelsen	4:54.7	92.23 km/h	(Finland) Juho Hänninen
2 (7 April)	SS15	17:41	Redrock 3	25.00 km	(Finland) Juho Hänninen	14:10.7	106.30 km/h	(Finland) Juho Hänninen
