= 2004 World Rally Championship =

32nd season of the FIA World Rally Championship

Champions
- World Drivers' Champion: Sébastien Loeb
- World Manufacturers' Champion: Citroën

Seasons
- ← 2003 2005 →

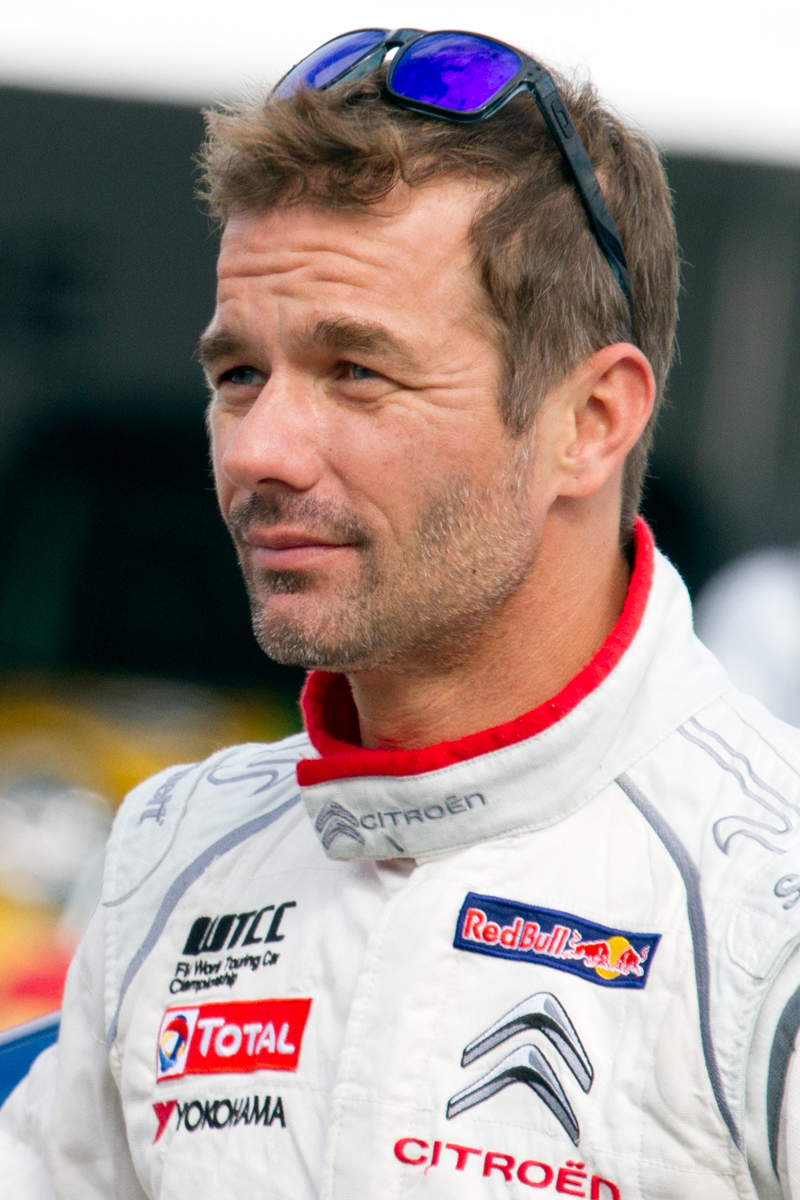
Sébastien Loeb (pictured in 2014) won his first WRC drivers' championship

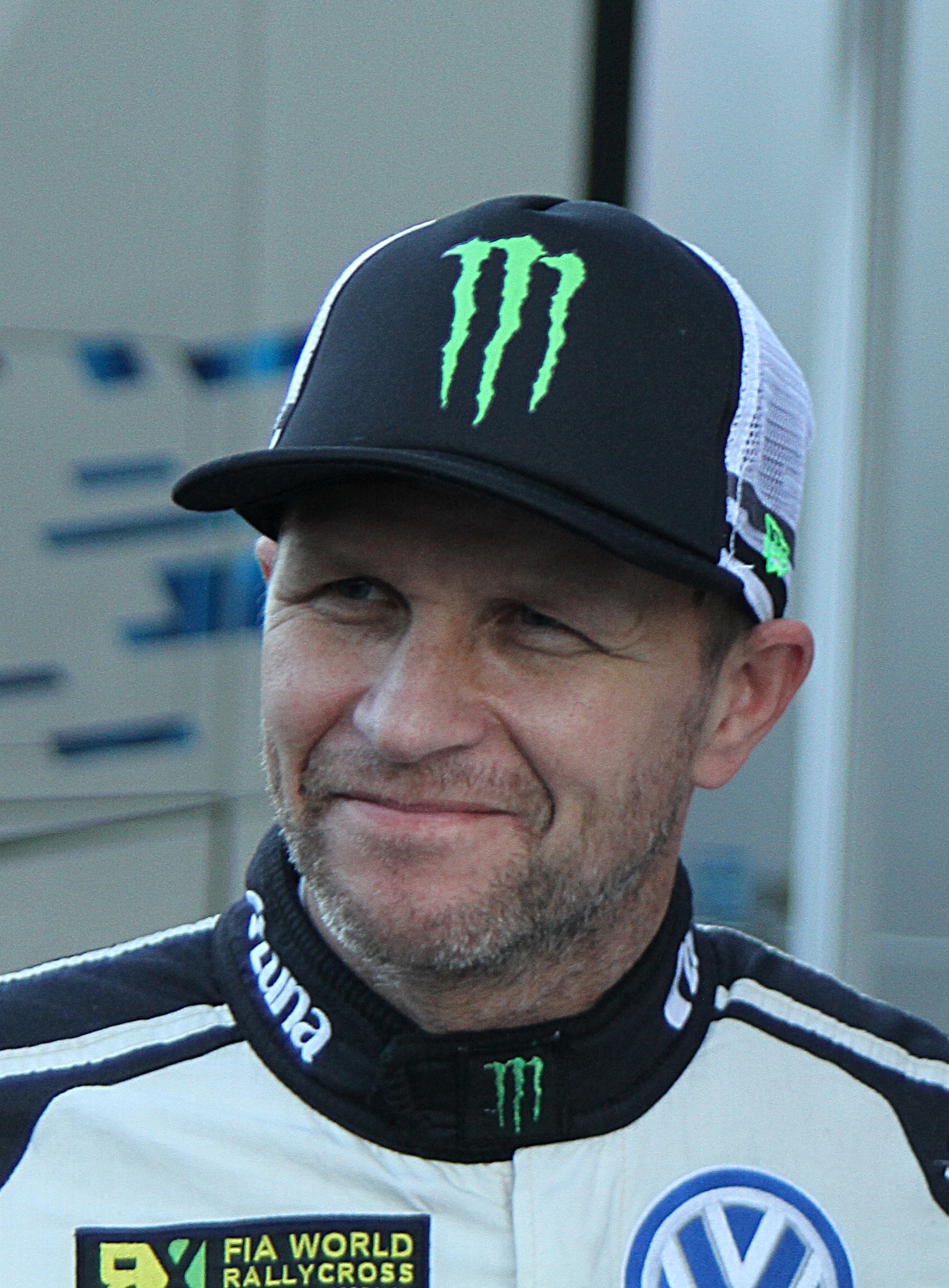
Defending champion Petter Solberg (pictured in 2017) was runner-up

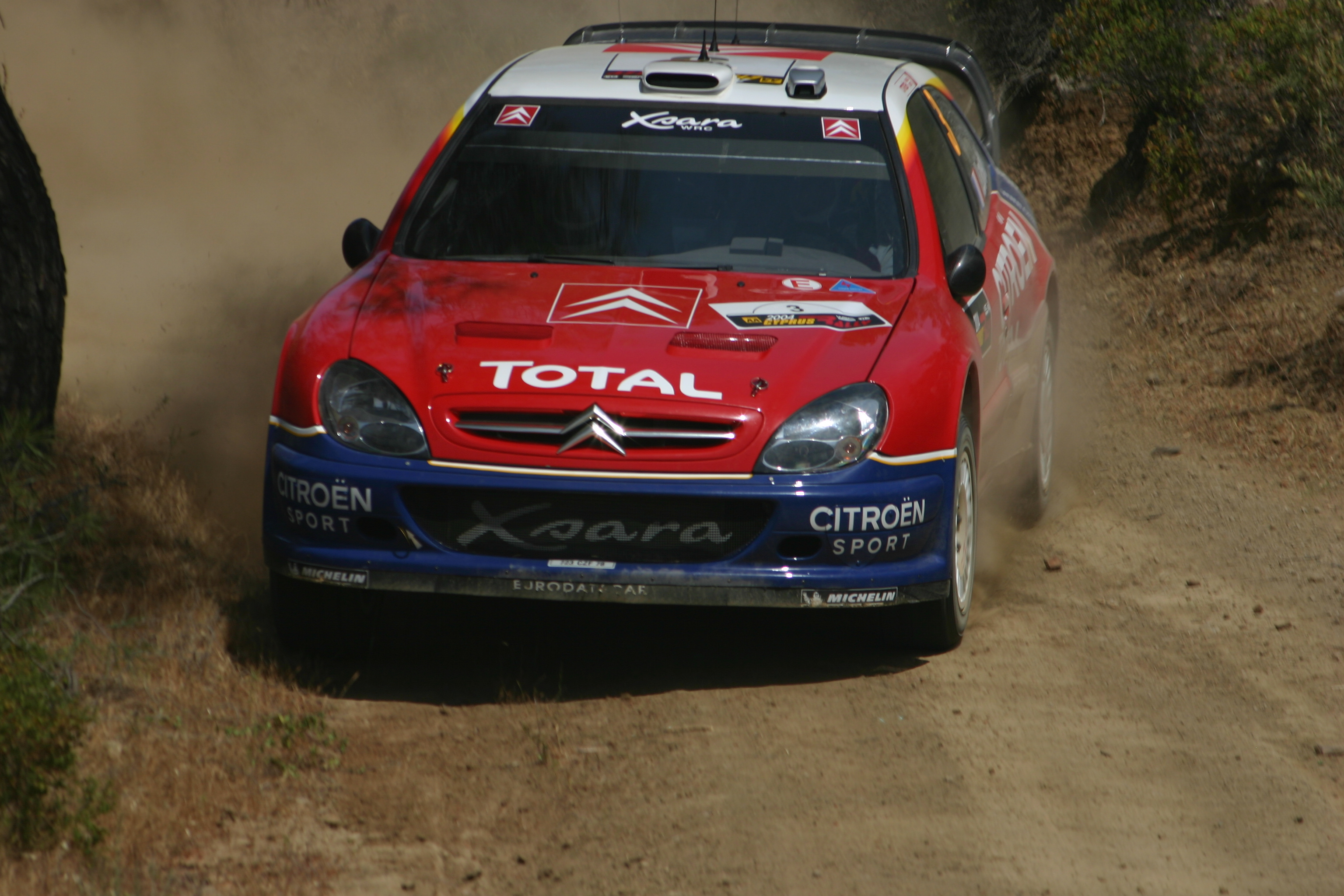
Citroën secured their second manufacturers' championship

The 2004 World Rally Championship was the 32nd season of the FIA World Rally Championship. The season consisted of 16 rallies. The drivers' world championship was won by Sébastien Loeb in a Citroën Xsara WRC, ahead of Petter Solberg and Markko Märtin. The manufacturers' title was won by Citroën, ahead of Ford and Subaru.

The video game WRC 4: The Official Game of the FIA World Rally Championship was based on this season.

== Calendar ==
The 2004 championship was contested over Sixteen rounds in Europe, Asia, North America, South America and Oceania.

Rd.	Start date	Finish date	Rally	Rally headquarters	Surface	Stages	Distance	Support class
1	23 January	25 January	(Monaco) 72nd Rallye Automobile Monte-Carlo	Monte Carlo	Mixed	15	389.12 km	JWRC
2	6 February	8 February	(Sweden) 53rd Uddeholm Swedish Rally	Karlstad, Värmland County	Snow	19	394.80 km	PWRC
3	12 March	14 March	1st Corona Rally Mexico	León, Guanajuato	Gravel	15	394.43 km	PWRC
4	15 April	18 April	35th Propecia Rally New Zealand	Manukau, Auckland	Gravel	23	395.50 km	PWRC
5	14 May	16 May	32nd Cyprus Rally	Lemesos, Limassol District	Gravel	18	326.68 km	None
6	3 June	6 June	51st Acropolis Rally of Greece	Lamia, Central Greece	Gravel	22	377.13 km	JWRC
7	24 June	27 June	5th Rally of Turkey	Kemer, Antalya Province	Gravel	17	383.33 km	JWRC
8	15 July	18 July	24th CTI Movil Rally Argentina	Carlos Paz, Córdoba	Gravel	26	382.63 km	PWRC
9	6 August	8 August	54th Neste Rally Finland	Jyväskylä, Central Finland	Gravel	22	382.71 km	JWRC
10	20 August	22 August	(Germany) 23rd OMV ADAC Rallye Deutschland	Trier, Rhineland-Palatinate	Tarmac	24	411.06 km	PWRC
11	3 September	5 September	4th Rally Japan	Obihiro, Hokkaido	Gravel	27	387.50 km	None
12	16 September	19 September	(United Kingdom) 60th Wales Rally GB	Cardiff, Wales	Gravel	19	394.03 km	JWRC
13	1 October	3 October	(Italy) 1st Supermag Rally Italia Sardinia	Olbia, Sardinia	Gravel	19	383.23 km	JWRC
14	15 October	17 October	48th Tour de Corse – Rallye de France	Ajaccio, Corsica	Tarmac	12	387.80 km	PWRC
15	29 October	31 October	(Spain) 40th Rally Catalunya – Costa Brava – Rally de España	Lloret de Mar, Catalonia	Tarmac	20	384.08 km	JWRC
16	11 November	14 November	17th Telstra Rally Australia	Perth, Western Australia	Gravel	25	388.25 km	PWRC

== Teams and drivers ==
World Rally Car entries eligible to score manufacturer points
Manufacturer	Car	Team	Tyre	No	Drivers	Co-Drivers	Rounds
Subaru	Impreza WRC2003 1–2; Impreza WRC2004 3–16	(Japan) 555 Subaru World Rally Team	P	1	(Norway) Petter Solberg	(Wales) Phil Mills	All
Subaru	Impreza WRC2003 1–2; Impreza WRC2004 3–16	(Japan) 555 Subaru World Rally Team	P	2	(Finland) Mikko Hirvonen	(Finland) Jarmo Lehtinen	All
Citroën	Xsara WRC	(France) Citroën Total	M	3	(France) Sébastien Loeb	(Monaco) Daniel Elena	All
Citroën	Xsara WRC	(France) Citroën Total	M	4	(Spain) Carlos Sainz	(Spain) Marc Martí	1–15
Peugeot	307 WRC	(France) Marlboro Peugeot Total	M	5	(Finland) Marcus Grönholm	(Finland) Timo Rautiainen	All
Peugeot	307 WRC	(France) Marlboro Peugeot Total	M	6	(Belgium) Freddy Loix	(Belgium) Sven Smeets	1–2, 15
Peugeot	307 WRC	(France) Marlboro Peugeot Total	M	6	(Finland) Harri Rovanperä	(Finland) Risto Pietiläinen	3–9, 11–13, 16
Peugeot	307 WRC	(France) Marlboro Peugeot Total	M	6	(France) Cédric Robert	(France) Gérald Bedon	10, 14
Peugeot	307 WRC	(France) Marlboro Peugeot Total	M	9	(Belgium) Freddy Loix	(Belgium) Sven Smeets	10, 14
Peugeot	307 WRC	(France) Marlboro Peugeot Total	M	14	(Finland) Sebastian Lindholm	(Finland) Tomi Tuominen	9
Peugeot	307 WRC	(France) Marlboro Peugeot Total	M	15	(Sweden) Daniel Carlsson	(Sweden) Mattias Andersson	12
Ford	Focus RS WRC 03 1–3; Focus RS WRC 04 4–16	(United States) Ford Motor Co Ltd	M	7	(Estonia) Markko Märtin	(United Kingdom) Michael Park	All
Ford	Focus RS WRC 03 1–3; Focus RS WRC 04 4–16	(United States) Ford Motor Co Ltd	M	8	(Belgium) François Duval	(Belgium) Stéphane Prévot	1-10, 12–16
Ford	Focus RS WRC 03 1–3; Focus RS WRC 04 4–16	(United States) Ford Motor Co Ltd	M	8	(Belgium) François Duval	(Belgium) Philippe Droeven	11
Mitsubishi	Lancer WRC04	(Japan) Mitsubishi Motors Motor Sports	M	9	(France) Gilles Panizzi	(France) Hervé Panizzi	1–10, 15
Mitsubishi	Lancer WRC04	(Japan) Mitsubishi Motors Motor Sports	M	10	(Italy) Gianluigi Galli	(Italy) Guido d'Amore	1, 3, 7
Mitsubishi	Lancer WRC04	(Japan) Mitsubishi Motors Motor Sports	M	10	(Finland) Kristian Sohlberg	(Finland) Kaj Lindström	2, 4–5, 8–9
Mitsubishi	Lancer WRC04	(Japan) Mitsubishi Motors Motor Sports	M	10	(Spain) Daniel Solà	(Spain) Xavier Amigò	6, 10, 15
Mitsubishi	Lancer WRC04	(Japan) Mitsubishi Motors Motor Sports	M	14	(Italy) Gianluigi Galli	(Italy) Guido d'Amore	15

World Rally Car entries ineligible to score manufacturer points
Manufacturer	Car	Team	Tyre	Drivers	Co-Drivers	Rounds
Škoda	Fabia WRC	(Czech Republic) Škoda Motorsport	M	(Germany) Armin Schwarz	(Germany) Manfred Hiemer	6, 9–10, 12–15
Škoda	Fabia WRC	(Czech Republic) Škoda Motorsport	M	(Finland) Toni Gardemeister	(Finland) Paavo Lukander	6, 9–10, 12–15
Škoda	Fabia WRC	(Czech Republic) Škoda Motorsport	M	(Czech Republic) Jan Kopecký	(Czech Republic) Filip Schovánek	15
Škoda	Fabia WRC	(Czech Republic) Škoda Motorsport	M	(Czech Republic) Roman Kresta	(Czech Republic) Jan Tománek	10
Škoda	Fabia WRC	(Czech Republic) Škoda Motorsport	M	(Finland) Jani Paasonen	(Finland) Jani Vainikka	9, 12
Ford	Focus WRC RS 02	(United States) Ford Motor Co Ltd	M	(Germany) Antony Warmbold	(United Kingdom) Gemma Price	All
Ford	Focus WRC RS 03	(United States) Ford Motor Co Ltd	M	(Finland) Janne Tuohino	(Finland) Jukka Aho	2
Ford	Focus WRC RS 04	(United States) Ford Motor Co Ltd	M	(Finland) Janne Tuohino	(Finland) Jukka Aho	9
Peugeot	206 WRC	(France) Bozian Racing	M P	(France) Nicolas Vouilloz	(France) David Fiorini	1
Peugeot	206 WRC	(France) Bozian Racing	M P	(France) Nicolas Vouilloz	(France) Denis Giraudet	6, 10, 12–15
Peugeot	206 WRC	(France) Bozian Racing	M P	(Portugal) Miguel Campos	(Portugal) Nuno Rodrigues da Silva	1, 5
Peugeot	206 WRC	(France) Bozian Racing	M P	(Norway) Henning Solberg	(Norway) Cato Menkerud	2, 4–5, 7, 9, 12–13
Peugeot	206 WRC	(France) Bozian Racing	M P	(Sweden) Daniel Carlsson	(Sweden) Mattias Andersson	2, 4, 6–7, 9–10, 14
Peugeot	206 WRC	(France) Bozian Racing	M P	(Argentina) Luís Pérez Companc	(Argentina) Jose Maria Volta	3, 5, 8, 13
Peugeot	206 WRC	(France) Bozian Racing	M P	(Austria) Manfred Stohl	(Austria) Ilka Minor	6, 12
Peugeot	206 WRC	Equipe de France FFSA	M	(France) Alexandre Bengué	(France) Caroline Escudero	1, 10, 14
Subaru	Impreza WRC2003	Equipe de France FFSA	M	(France) Stéphane Sarrazin	(France) Patrick Pivato	10, 14–15
Subaru	Impreza WRC2003	(Switzerland) Scuderia Chicco d'Oro	P	(Switzerland) Olivier Burri	(Switzerland) Jean-Philippe Patthey	1
Subaru	Impreza WRC2001	(United Kingdom) Dom Buckley Motorsport	P	(Republic of Ireland) Eamonn Boland	(Republic of Ireland) Francis Regan	1
Subaru	Impreza WRC2003	(United Kingdom) Dom Buckley Motorsport	P	(Republic of Ireland) Eamonn Boland	(Republic of Ireland) Francis Regan	15
Subaru	Impreza WRC2003	(United Kingdom) ADR Motorsport	P	(United Kingdom) Alistair Ginley	(Republic of Ireland) Rory Kennedy	5–7, 9–10, 12
Subaru	Impreza WRC2003	(Italy) Aimont Racing Team	P	(Italy) Andrea Navarra	(Italy) Simona Fedeli	13
Hyundai	Accent WRC3	(South Korea) Hyundai World Rally Team	M	(Czech Republic) Roman Kresta	(Czech Republic) Jan Tománek	1
Hyundai	Accent WRC3	(South Korea) Hyundai World Rally Team	M	(Finland) Jussi Välimäki	(Finland) Jakke Honkanen	1, 3, 5–6
Hyundai	Accent WRC3	(South Korea) Hyundai World Rally Team	M	(Slovakia) Jozef Béreš Jr.	(Czech Republic) Petr Starý	1–2, 6
Hyundai	Accent WRC3	(South Korea) Hyundai World Rally Team	M	(Norway) Kristian Kolberg	(Norway) Ola Fløene	2
Hyundai	Accent WRC3	(South Korea) Hyundai World Rally Team	M	(Norway) Thomas Kolberg	(Norway) Ole Kristian Unnerud	2
Hyundai	Accent WRC	(Turkey) Hyundai Assan Motorsports		(Turkey) Murat Akdilek	(Turkey) Caglar Suren	7
Hyundai	Accent WRC	(Turkey) Hyundai Assan Motorsports		(Turkey) Ender Alkoclar	(Turkey) Ismet Özbakir	7
Ford	Focus RS WRC 03	(Finland) Jussi Välimäki	M	(Finland) Jussi Välimäki	(Finland) Jakke Honkanen	10
Citroën	Xsara WRC	(Belgium) Citroën Kronos Racing Team	M	(Finland) Juuso Pykälistö	(Finland) Mika Ovaskainen	9, 13
Ford	Focus RS WRC 02	(Finland) Supset	M	(Finland) Janne Tuohino	(Finland) Jukka Aho	5–12
Ford	Focus RS WRC 02	(Czech Republic) JM Engineering	M	(Czech Republic) Roman Kresta	(Czech Republic) Jan Tománek	6
Ford	Focus RS WRC 01	(United Kingdom) M-Sport	M	(United Kingdom) Mark Higgins	(United Kingdom) Michael Gibson	12
Ford	Focus RS WRC 02	(United Kingdom) M-Sport	M	(United Kingdom) Matthew Wilson	(United Kingdom) Scott Martin	12
Ford	Focus RS WRC 03	(United Kingdom) M-Sport	M	(Finland) Jari Viita	(Finland) Timo Hantunen	2, 4
Ford	Focus RS WRC 02	(Switzerland) Philippe Roux	P	(Switzerland) Philippe Roux	(Switzerland) Paul Corthay	1
Škoda	Octavia WRC	(Italy) Riccardo Errani	P	(Italy) Riccardo Errani	(Italy) Stefano Casadio	1
Toyota	Corolla WRC	(Norway) Thomas Schie	M	(Norway) Thomas Schie	(Norway) Ragnar Engen	2
Ford	Focus RS WRC 03	(Finland) Jari Viita	M	(Finland) Jari Viita	(Finland) Timo Hantunen	9
Ford	Focus RS WRC 01	(Greece) Ioannis Papadimitriou		(Greece) Ioannis Papadimitriou	(United Kingdom) Allan Harryman	5
Ford	Focus RS WRC 03	(Greece) Ioannis Papadimitriou		(Greece) Ioannis Papadimitriou	(United Kingdom) Allan Harryman	6
Ford	Focus RS WRC 03	(Greece) Armodios Vovos		(Greece) Armodios Vovos	(Greece) "El-Em"	6
Ford	Focus RS WRC 01	(Turkey) Serkan Yazici	P	(Turkey) Serkan Yazici	(Turkey) Can Okan	7
Ford	Focus RS WRC 01	(Turkey) Adnan Sarihan		(Turkey) Adnan Sarihan	(Turkey) Orhan Celen	7
Škoda	Octavia WRC Evo3	(Hungary) Tamás Tagai	P	(Hungary) Tamás Tagai	(Hungary) Róbert Tagai	9
Toyota	Corolla WRC	(Germany) Armin Kremer	M	(Germany) Armin Kremer	(Germany) Fred Berßen	10
Toyota	Corolla WRC	(Belgium) Pieter Tsjoen	M	(Belgium) Pieter Tsjoen	(Belgium) Eddy Chevaillier	10
Ford	Focus RS WRC 02	(United Kingdom) Dougi Hall		(United Kingdom) Dougi Hall	(United Kingdom) Steve Egglestone	12
Hyundai	Accent WRC3	(United Kingdom) Craig Middleton		(United Kingdom) Craig Middleton	(United Kingdom) Robin Hernaman	12
Hyundai	Accent WRC	(United Kingdom) Steve Petch		(United Kingdom) Steve Petch	(United Kingdom) John Richardson	12
Škoda	Octavia WRC Evo3	(Romania) Constantin Aur		(Romania) Constantin Aur	(Romania) Adrian Berghea	12
SEAT	Córdoba WRC	(Romania) Dan Gîrtofan		(Romania) Dan Gîrtofan	(Romania) Dorin Pulpea	12
Hyundai	Accent WRC3	(United Kingdom) Nigel Heath		(United Kingdom) Nigel Heath	(United Kingdom) Alec Cooper	12
Hyundai	Accent WRC3	(Greece) Yorgo Philippedes		(Greece) Yorgo Philippedes	(United Kingdom) Mark Andrews	12
Ford	Focus RS WRC 01	(Hungary) Balázs Benik		(Hungary) Balázs Benik	(Hungary) Bence Rácz	13
Toyota	Corolla WRC	(Italy) Pier Lorenzo Zanchi		(Italy) Pier Lorenzo Zanchi	(Italy) Dario D'Esposito	13
Subaru	Impreza WRC2001	(France) Alain Vauthier		(France) Alain Vauthier	(France) François Ravault	14
Toyota	Corolla WRC	(France) José Micheli		(France) José Micheli	(France) Marie-Josée Cardi	14
Ford	Focus RS WRC 01	(Republic of Ireland) Donie O'Sullivan		(Republic of Ireland) Donie O'Sullivan	(Republic of Ireland) Paul Nagle	15
Subaru	Impreza WRC2003	(Republic of Ireland) Paddy White		(Republic of Ireland) Paddy White	(France) Bruno Brissart	15
Toyota	Corolla WRC	(Switzerland) Massimo Beltrami		(Switzerland) Massimo Beltrami	(Italy) Fabio Ceschino	15

=== JWRC entries ===
Team	Manufacturer	Car	No	Drivers	Co-drivers	Rounds
(Japan) Suzuki Sport	Suzuki	Ignis S1600	31	(San Marino) Mirco Baldacci	(Italy) Giovanni Bernacchini	1, 6–7, 9, 12–13, 15
(Japan) Suzuki Sport	Suzuki	Ignis S1600	32	(Estonia) Urmo Aava	(Estonia) Kuldar Sikk	1, 6–7, 9, 12–13, 15
(Japan) Suzuki Sport	Suzuki	Ignis S1600	33	(United Kingdom) Guy Wilks	(United Kingdom) Phil Pugh	1, 6–7, 9, 12–13, 15
(Japan) Suzuki Sport	Suzuki	Ignis S1600	35	(Finland) Kosti Katajamäki	(Finland) Timo Alanne	1, 6–7, 9, 12–13, 15
(Japan) Suzuki Sport	Suzuki	Ignis S1600	43	(Finland) Jari-Matti Latvala	(Finland) Miikka Anttila	9, 12–13, 15
(Japan) Suzuki Sport	Suzuki	Ignis S1600	45	(Sweden) Per-Gunnar Andersson	(Sweden) Jonas Andersson	1, 6–7, 9, 12–13, 15
(San Marino) Sab Motorsport	Fiat	Punto S1600	34	(San Marino) Alessandro Broccoli	(Italy) Giovanni Agnese	1, 6–7, 9, 12–13, 15
(United Kingdom) McRae Motorsport	Opel	Corsa S1600	36	(United Kingdom) Kris Meeke	(United Kingdom) Chris Patterson	1, 6–7, 9
(United Kingdom) McRae Motorsport	Opel	Corsa S1600	36	(United Kingdom) Kris Meeke	(United Kingdom) David Senior	12–13
(United Kingdom) McRae Motorsport	Citroën	C2 S1600	36	(United Kingdom) Kris Meeke	(United Kingdom) David Senior	15
(Italy) Autorel Sport	Renault	Clio S1600	37	(Italy) Luca Cecchettini	(Italy) Nicola Arena	1, 6–7, 9, 12–13
(Italy) Astra Racing	Ford	Puma S1600	38	(Lebanon) Abdo Feghali	(Lebanon) Joseph Matar	1
(Italy) Astra Racing	Ford	Fiesta S1600	38	(Lebanon) Abdo Feghali	(Lebanon) Joseph Matar	6–7
(Italy) Astra Racing	Ford	Fiesta S1600	43	(Finland) Jari-Matti Latvala	(Finland) Miikka Anttila	6–7
(Italy) Astra Racing	Ford	Puma S1600	43	(Finland) Jari-Matti Latvala	(Finland) Miikka Anttila	1
(France) Renault Sport	Renault	Clio S1600	39	(France) Nicolas Bernardi	(France) Denis Giraudet	1, 6–7, 9, 12–13, 15
(France) Renault Sport	Renault	Clio S1600	51	(Belgium) Larry Cols	(Belgium) Filip Goddé	1, 6–7, 9, 12–13, 15
(France) Citroën Total	Citroën	Saxo S1600	40	(France) Guerlain Chicherit	(France) Michel Perin	1
(France) Citroën Total	Citroën	Saxo S1600	40	(France) Guerlain Chicherit	(France) Mattiheu Baumel	6–7, 9, 12–13, 15
(United Kingdom) Risbridger Motorsport	MG	ZR S1600	41	(United Kingdom) Natalie Barratt	(United Kingdom) Carl Williamson	1
(United Kingdom) Risbridger Motorsport	Renault	Clio S1600	41	(United Kingdom) Natalie Barratt	(United Kingdom) Carl Williamson	6–7, 9, 12–13, 15
(Italy) Power Car Team	Renault	Clio S1600	42	(France) Mathieu Biasion	(France) Eric Domenech	9, 12–13
(Italy) H.F. Grifone SRL	Fiat	Punto S1600	42	(France) Mathieu Biasion	(France) Eric Domenech	6–7
(Italy) H.F. Grifone SRL	Fiat	Punto S1600	42	(France) Mathieu Biasion	(France) Philippe Coquard	1
(Italy) H.F. Grifone SRL	Fiat	Punto S1600	44	(Italy) Alan Scorcioni	(Italy) Massimo Daddoveri	1, 6–7, 9
(Italy) H.F. Grifone SRL	Fiat	Punto S1600	44	(Italy) Alan Scorcioni	(San Marino) Silvio Stefanelli	12
(Italy) H.F. Grifone SRL	Fiat	Punto S1600	44	(Italy) Alan Scorcioni	(Italy) Fulvio Florean	13, 15
(Italy) H.F. Grifone SRL	Fiat	Punto S1600	47	(Italy) Luca Tabaton	(Italy) Gisella Rovegno	1, 6–7, 9, 12–13, 15
(Spain) RACC Motor Sport	Fiat	Punto S1600	46	(Spain) Xavier Pons	(Spain) Oriol Julià	1, 6–7, 9, 12–13
(Spain) RACC Motor Sport	Renault	Clio S1600	46	(Spain) Xavier Pons	(Spain) Oriol Julià	15
(United Kingdom) Team Birkbeck Rallysport	Ford	Puma S1600	48	(Zimbabwe) Conrad Rautenbach	(Zimbabwe) Peter Marsh	1
(United Kingdom) Team Birkbeck Rallysport	Opel	Corsa S1600	48	(Zimbabwe) Conrad Rautenbach	(United Kingdom) Timothy Sturla	6–7
(United Kingdom) Team Birkbeck Rallysport	Opel	Corsa S1600	48	(Zimbabwe) Conrad Rautenbach	(United Kingdom) Mark Jones	9, 12
(United Kingdom) Team Birkbeck Rallysport	Suzuki	Ignis S1600	48	(Zimbabwe) Conrad Rautenbach	(United Kingdom) Mark Jones	13
(United Kingdom) Team Birkbeck Rallysport	Citroën	Saxo S1600	48	(Zimbabwe) Conrad Rautenbach	(United Kingdom) Mark Jones	15
(Italy) Meteco Corse	Peugeot	206 S1600	49	(Italy) Luca Betti	(Italy) Michele Rosso	1, 7
(Italy) Meteco Corse	Peugeot	206 S1600	49	(Italy) Luca Betti	(Italy) Paolo del Grande	6, 9
(Italy) Meteco Corse	Fiat	Punto S1600	49	(Italy) Luca Betti	(Italy) Michele Rosso	12–13
(Italy) Meteco Corse	Fiat	Punto S1600	49	(Italy) Luca Betti	(Italy) Paolo del Grande	15
(United Kingdom) Prospeed Motorsport	Renault	Clio S1600	50	(United Kingdom) Oliver Marshall	(United Kingdom) Craig Parry	1, 6–7, 9, 12–13, 15

=== PWRC entries ===
Team	Manufacturer	Car	No	Drivers	Co-drivers	Rounds
(Japan) Subaru Team Arai	Subaru	Impreza WRX STI	31	(Japan) Toshihiro Arai	(New Zealand) Tony Sircombe	2–4, 8, 10, 16
(Malaysia) Petronas EON Racing Team	Proton	Pert	32	(Malaysia) Karamjit Singh	(Malaysia) Allen Oh	2–4, 8, 10, 16
Ralliart Italy	Mitsubishi	Lancer Evo VII	33	(Spain) Daniel Solá	(Spain) Xavier Amigò	2–4, 8, 14, 16
Ralliart Italy	Mitsubishi	Lancer Evo VII	43	(Italy) Gianluigi Galli	(Italy) Guido D'Amore	2, 4, 8, 10, 14, 16
(Japan) Syms	Subaru	Impreza WRX STI	34	(United Kingdom) Niall McShea	(United Kingdom) Gordon Noble	3–4
(Japan) Syms	Subaru	Impreza WRX STI	34	(United Kingdom) Niall McShea	(United Kingdom) Michael Orr	8, 10, 14, 16
(Italy) Top Run SRL	Subaru	Impreza WRX STI	35	(Argentina) Marcos Ligato	(Argentina) Rubén García	2, 16
(Italy) Top Run SRL	Subaru	Impreza WRX STI	35	(Argentina) Marcos Ligato	(Argentina) Jorge Del Buono	3–4
(Italy) Top Run SRL	Subaru	Impreza WRX STI	35	(Argentina) Marcos Ligato	(Argentina) Diego Curletto	8, 14
(Italy) Top Run SRL	Subaru	Impreza WRX STI	42	(United Kingdom) Mark Higgins	(United Kingdom) Michael Gibson	2–4, 8, 14, 16
(Italy) Top Run SRL	Subaru	Impreza WRX STI	45	(Italy) Fabio Frisiero	(Italy) Giovanni Agnese	2–4, 8, 14, 16
(Mexico) Triviño Racing	Mitsubishi	Lancer Evo VII	36	(Mexico) Ricardo Triviño	(Spain) Jordi Barradés	2–3, 8, 10, 14
(Mexico) Triviño Racing	Mitsubishi	Lancer Evo VIII	36	(Mexico) Ricardo Triviño	(Spain) Jordi Barradés	4
(Sweden) Millbrooks World Rally Team	Subaru	Impreza WRX STI	37	(Sweden) Joakim Roman	(Sweden) Ragnar Spjuth	2–4, 10, 14, 16
(Bulgaria) Racing Team Bulgartabac	Mitsubishi	Lancer Evo VII	38	(Bulgaria) Georgi Geradzhiev	(Bulgaria) Nikola Popov	2, 4, 8, 10, 14, 16
(United Kingdom) R.E.D World Rally Team	Subaru	Impreza WRX STI	39	(United Kingdom) Alister McRae	(United Kingdom) David Senior	2–4, 10, 14, 16
(Austria) OMV World Rally Team	Mitsubishi	Lancer Evo VII	40	(Austria) Manfred Stohl	(Austria) Ilka Minor	2–4, 8, 10, 16
(Austria) OMV World Rally Team	Mitsubishi	Lancer Evo VII	41	(Finland) Jani Paasonen	(Finland) Sirkka Rautiainen	2–4, 8, 10, 16
(Austria) OMV World Rally Team	Mitsubishi	Lancer Evo VI	50	(Germany) Sebastian Vollak	(Germany) Michael Kölbach	2, 4, 8, 10, 14, 16
(United Kingdom) Autotek Motorsport	Subaru	Impreza WRX STI	44	(Qatar) Nasser Al-Attiyah	(United Kingdom) Steve Lancaster	2–3
(United Kingdom) Autotek Motorsport	Subaru	Impreza WRX STI	44	(Qatar) Nasser Al-Attiyah	(United Kingdom) Chris Patterson	4, 8, 14, 16
Kuchar Team Poland	Mitsubishi	Lancer Evo VII	46	(Poland) Tomasz Kuchar	(Poland) Maciek Wodniak	2–4, 10, 14, 16
Ralliart Spain	Mitsubishi	Lancer Evo VII	47	(Spain) Xavier Pons	(Spain) Oriol Julià	2–4, 8, 10, 14, 16
Ralliart Spain	Mitsubishi	Lancer Evo VII	49	(Spain) Sergio Fombona	(Spain) Guifré Pujol	2–4, 8, 10, 14
(Japan) Advan-Piaa Rally Team	Mitsubishi	Lancer Evo VIII	48	(Japan) Fumio Nutahara	(Japan) Satoshi Hayashi	3–4, 8, 10, 14, 16

== Results and standings ==
=== Rally results ===
The highest finishing competitor entered in each WRC class is listed below. Non-championship entries may have finished ahead of WRC competitors in individual rounds.

Rd.	Rally	Overall winners	PWRC Winners	JWRC winners	Report
1	(Monaco) Monte Carlo	(France) No. 3 Citroën Total WRT	N/A	(France) No. 39 Renault Sport	Report
1	(Monaco) Monte Carlo	(France) Citroën Xsara WRC	N/A	(France) Renault Clio S1600	Report
1	(Monaco) Monte Carlo	(France) Sébastien Loeb (Monaco) Daniel Elena	N/A	(France) Nicolas Bernardi (France) Denis Giraudet	Report
2	Sweden	(France) No. 3 Citroën Total WRT	(Austria) No. 41 OMV World Rally Team	N/A	Report
2	Sweden	(France) Citroën Xsara WRC	(Japan) Mitsubishi Lancer Evo VII	N/A	Report
2	Sweden	(France) Sébastien Loeb (Monaco) Daniel Elena	(Finland) Jani Paasonen (Finland) Sirkka Rautiainen	N/A	Report
3	Mexico	(United States) No. 7 Ford Motor Co. Ltd	(Italy) No. 33 Ralliart Italia	N/A	Report
3	Mexico	(United States) Ford Focus RS WRC '03	(Japan) Mitsubishi Lancer Evo VII	N/A	Report
3	Mexico	(Estonia) Markko Märtin (United Kingdom) Michael Park	(Spain) Daniel Solá (Spain) Xavier Amigò	N/A	Report
4	New Zealand	(Japan) No. 1 555 Subaru WRT	(Austria) No. 40 OMV World Rally Team	N/A	Report
4	New Zealand	(Japan) Subaru Impreza S10 WRC '04	(Japan) Mitsubishi Lancer Evo VII	N/A	Report
4	New Zealand	(Norway) Petter Solberg (United Kingdom) Phil Mills	(Austria) Manfred Stohl (Austria) Ilka Minor	N/A	Report
5	Cyprus	(France) No. 3 Citroën Total WRT	N/A	N/A	Report
5	Cyprus	(France) Citroën Xsara WRC	N/A	N/A	Report
5	Cyprus	(France) Sébastien Loeb (Monaco) Daniel Elena	N/A	N/A	Report
6	Greece	(Japan) No. 1 555 Subaru WRT	N/A	(Japan) No. 33 Suzuki Sport	Report
6	Greece	(Japan) Subaru Impreza S10 WRC '04	N/A	(Japan) Suzuki Ignis S1600	Report
6	Greece	(Norway) Petter Solberg (United Kingdom) Phil Mills	N/A	(United Kingdom) Guy Wilks (United Kingdom) Phil Pugh	Report
7	Turkey	(France) No. 3 Citroën Total WRT	N/A	(Japan) No. 45 Suzuki Sport	Report
7	Turkey	(France) Citroën Xsara WRC	N/A	(Japan) Suzuki Ignis S1600	Report
7	Turkey	(France) Sébastien Loeb (Monaco) Daniel Elena	N/A	(Sweden) Per-Gunnar Andersson (Sweden) Jonas Andersson	Report
8	Argentina	(France) No. 4 Citroën Total WRT	(Austria) No. 41 OMV World Rally Team	N/A	Report
8	Argentina	(France) Citroën Xsara WRC	(Japan) Mitsubishi Lancer Evo VII	N/A	Report
8	Argentina	(Spain) Carlos Sainz (Spain) Marc Martí	(Finland) Jani Paasonen (Finland) Jani Vainikka	N/A	Report
9	Finland	(France) No. 5 Marlboro Peugeot Total	N/A	(Japan) No. 45 Suzuki Sport	Report
9	Finland	(France) Peugeot 307 WRC	N/A	(Japan) Suzuki Ignis S1600	Report
9	Finland	(Finland) Marcus Grönholm (Finland) Timo Rautiainen	N/A	(Sweden) Per-Gunnar Andersson (Sweden) Jonas Andersson	Report
10	Germany	(France) No. 3 Citroën Total WRT	No. 47 Ralliart Spain	N/A	Report
10	Germany	(France) Citroën Xsara WRC	(Japan) Mitsubishi Lancer Evo VIII	N/A	Report
10	Germany	(France) Sébastien Loeb (Monaco) Daniel Elena	(Spain) Xavier Pons (Spain) Oriol Julià	N/A	Report
11	Japan	(Japan) No. 1 555 Subaru WRT	N/A	N/A	Report
11	Japan	(Japan) Subaru Impreza S10 WRC '04	N/A	N/A	Report
11	Japan	(Norway) Petter Solberg (United Kingdom) Phil Mills	N/A	N/A	Report
12	(United Kingdom) Britain	(Japan) No. 1 555 Subaru WRT	N/A	(Japan) No. 33 Suzuki Sport	Report
12	(United Kingdom) Britain	(Japan) Subaru Impreza S10 WRC '04	N/A	(Japan) Suzuki Ignis S1600	Report
12	(United Kingdom) Britain	(Norway) Petter Solberg (United Kingdom) Phil Mills	N/A	(United Kingdom) Guy Wilks (United Kingdom) Phil Pugh	Report
13	Italy	(Japan) No. 1 555 Subaru WRT	N/A	(Japan) No. 45 Suzuki Sport	Report
13	Italy	(Japan) Subaru Impreza S10 WRC '04	N/A	(Japan) Suzuki Ignis S1600	Report
13	Italy	(Norway) Petter Solberg (United Kingdom) Phil Mills	N/A	(Sweden) Per-Gunnar Andersson (Sweden) Jonas Andersson	Report
14	France	(United States) No. 7 Ford Motor Co. Ltd	No. 47 Ralliart Spain	N/A	Report
14	France	(United States) Ford Focus RS WRC '04	(Japan) Mitsubishi Lancer Evo VIII	N/A	Report
14	France	(Estonia) Markko Märtin (United Kingdom) Michael Park	(Spain) Xavier Pons (Spain) Oriol Julià	N/A	Report
15	Spain	(United States) No. 7 Ford Motor Co. Ltd	N/A	(France) No. 39 Renault Sport	Report
15	Spain	(United States) Ford Focus RS WRC '04	N/A	(France) Renault Clio S1600	Report
15	Spain	(Estonia) Markko Märtin (United Kingdom) Michael Park	N/A	(France) Nicolas Bernardi (Belgium) Jean-Marc Fortin	Report
16	Australia	(France) No. 3 Citroën Total WRT	No. 47 Ralliart Spain	N/A	Report
16	Australia	(France) Citroën Xsara WRC	(Japan) Mitsubishi Lancer Evo VIII	N/A	Report
16	Australia	(France) Sébastien Loeb (Monaco) Daniel Elena	(Spain) Xavier Pons (Spain) Oriol Julià	N/A	Report

=== Drivers' championship ===
Pos.	Driver	MON (Monaco)	SWE (Sweden)	MEX (Mexico)	NZL (New Zealand)	CYP (Cyprus)	GRE (Greece)	TUR (Turkey)	ARG (Argentina)	FIN (Finland)	GER (Germany)	JPN (Japan)	GBR (United Kingdom)	ITA (Italy)	FRA (France)	ESP (Spain)	AUS (Australia)	Pts
1	(France) Sébastien Loeb	1	1	Ret	4	1	2	1	2	4	1	2	2	2	2	Ret	1	118
2	(Norway) Petter Solberg	7	3	4	1	4	1	3	Ret	Ret	Ret	1	1	1	5	5	Ret	82
3	(Estonia) Markko Märtin	2	7	1	3	2	Ret	24	Ret	2	4	3	3	Ret	1	1	Ret	79
4	(Spain) Carlos Sainz	Ret	5	3	6	3	19	4	1	3	3	5	4	3	3	3	WD	73
5	(Finland) Marcus Grönholm	4	2	6	2	DSQ	Ret	2	Ret	1	Ret	4	Ret	7	4	2	Ret	62
6	(Belgium) François Duval	3	Ret	2	18	Ret	4	5	3	7	2	Ret	5	5	Ret	Ret	3	53
7	(Finland) Mikko Hirvonen	Ret	9	5	7	5	Ret	6	4	Ret	8	7	7	Ret	10	8	4	29
8	(Finland) Harri Rovanperä			10	5	DSQ	3	Ret	5	Ret		6	6	Ret			2	28
9	(Finland) Janne Tuohino		4			6	7	7		5			Ret					16
10	(Belgium) Freddy Loix	5	Ret								6				7	Ret		9
11	(France) Stéphane Sarrazin										9				6	4		8
12	(Sweden) Daniel Carlsson		8		8		5	Ret		9	Ret		Ret		11			6
13	(France) Gilles Panizzi	6	Ret	8	Ret	Ret	10	Ret	7	11	Ret					12		6
14	(Italy) Andrea Navarra													4				5
15	(Italy) Gianluigi Galli	Ret	24	Ret	Ret			10	Ret	14	Ret			6	Ret	7	Ret	5
16	(Australia) Chris Atkinson				Ret					33		12					5	4
17	(France) Cédric Robert										5				Ret			4
18	(Austria) Manfred Stohl		Ret	Ret	10		6		12		32		8				Ret	4
19	(Norway) Henning Solberg		6		Ret	Ret		Ret		10			11	Ret				3
20	(Finland) Jani Paasonen		16	Ret	14				10	6	20		Ret				Ret	3
21	(Spain) Daniel Solà		20	11	Ret		Ret		DSQ		Ret				Ret	6	Ret	3
22	(Spain) Xavier Pons	Ret	46	16	16		16	Ret	Ret	28	15		24	Ret	12	Ret	6	3
23	(Argentina) Luís Pérez Companc			Ret		Ret			6					Ret				3
24	(Finland) Toni Gardemeister						Ret			8	7		22	Ret	9	9		3
25	(Germany) Antony Warmbold	Ret	15	9	19	Ret	9	8	9	Ret	13	8	10	8	20	13	14	3
26	(United Kingdom) Alistair Ginley					7	11	Ret		15	Ret		12					2
27	(Finland) Jussi Välimäki	11		7		Ret	Ret			26	14							2
28	(Australia) Cody Crocker				11							14					7	2
29	(Germany) Armin Schwarz						Ret			12	11		Ret	Ret	8	11		1
30	(Japan) Toshi Arai		26	13	15				Ret		18	9					8	1
31	(Switzerland) Olivier Burri	8																1
32	(Portugal) Miguel Campos	Ret				8												1
33	(Greece) Aris Vovos						8											1
34	(Argentina) Gabriel Pozzo								8									1
Pos.	Driver	MON (Monaco)	SWE (Sweden)	MEX (Mexico)	NZL (New Zealand)	CYP (Cyprus)	GRE (Greece)	TUR (Turkey)	ARG (Argentina)	FIN (Finland)	GER (Germany)	JPN (Japan)	GBR (United Kingdom)	ITA (Italy)	FRA (France)	ESP (Spain)	AUS (Australia)	Pts

Key
Colour	Result
Gold	Winner
Silver	2nd place
Bronze	3rd place
Green	Points finish
Blue	Non-points finish
Blue	Non-classified finish (NC)
Purple	Did not finish (Ret)
Black	Excluded (EX)
Black	Disqualified (DSQ)
White	Did not start (DNS)
White	Cancelled (C)
Blank	Withdrew entry from the event (WD)

- Sébastien Loeb secured the drivers' championship title in Tour de Corse.

=== Manufacturers' championship ===
Pos.	Manufacturer	No.	MON (Monaco)	SWE (Sweden)	MEX (Mexico)	NZL (New Zealand)	CYP (Cyprus)	GRE (Greece)	TUR (Turkey)	ARG (Argentina)	FIN (Finland)	GER (Germany)	JPN (Japan)	GBR (United Kingdom)	ITA (Italy)	FRA (France)	ESP (Spain)	AUS (Australia)	Points
1	(France) Citroën	3	1	1	Ret	4	1	2	1	2	4	1	2	2	2	2	Ret	1	194
1	(France) Citroën	4	Ret	5	3	6	3	6	4	1	3	3	5	4	3	3	3	WD	194
2	(United Kingdom) Ford	7	2	7	1	3	2	Ret	8	Ret	2	4	3	3	Ret	1	1	Ret	143
2	(United Kingdom) Ford	8	3	4	2	8	Ret	4	5	3	5	2	Ret	5	4	Ret	Ret	3	143
3	(Japan) Subaru	1	7	3	4	1	4	1	3	Ret	Ret	Ret	1	1	1	5	4	Ret	122
3	(Japan) Subaru	2	Ret	7	5	7	5	Ret	6	4	Ret	6	7	7	Ret	6	5	4	122
4	(France) Peugeot	5	4	2	6	2	DSQ	Ret	2	Ret	1	Ret	4	Ret	5	4	2	Ret	101
4	(France) Peugeot	6	5	Ret	8	5	DSQ	3	Ret	5	Ret	5	6	6	Ret	Ret	Ret	2	101
5	(Japan) Mitsubishi	9	6	Ret	7	Ret	Ret	5	Ret	6	6	Ret							17
5	(Japan) Mitsubishi	10	Ret	Ret	Ret	Ret	Ret	Ret	7	Ret	Ret	Ret							17
Pos.	Manufacturer	No.	MON (Monaco)	SWE (Sweden)	MEX (Mexico)	NZL (New Zealand)	CYP (Cyprus)	GRE (Greece)	TUR (Turkey)	ARG (Argentina)	FIN (Finland)	GER (Germany)	JPN (Japan)	GBR (United Kingdom)	ITA (Italy)	FRA (France)	ESP (Spain)	AUS (Australia)	Points

Key
Colour	Result
Gold	Winner
Silver	2nd place
Bronze	3rd place
Green	Points finish
Blue	Non-points finish
Blue	Non-classified finish (NC)
Purple	Did not finish (Ret)
Black	Excluded (EX)
Black	Disqualified (DSQ)
White	Did not start (DNS)
White	Cancelled (C)
Blank	Withdrew entry from the event (WD)

- Citroën secured the manufacturers' championship in Tour de Corse.

=== JWRC Drivers' championship ===
Pos.	Driver	MON (Monaco)	GRE (Greece)	TUR (Turkey)	FIN (Finland)	GBR (United Kingdom)	ITA (Italy)	ESP (Spain)	Pts
1	(Sweden) Per-Gunnar Andersson	8	Ret	1	1	Ret	1	2	39
2	(France) Nicolas Bernardi	1	2	Ret	3	Ret	6	1	37
3	(United Kingdom) Guy Wilks	Ret	1	3	Ret	1	2	Ret	34
4	(Finland) Kosti Katajamäki	Ret	Ret	2	2	3	4	5	31
5	(San Marino) Mirco Baldacci	6	Ret	6	4	Ret	3	3	23
6	(Belgium) Larry Cols	5	4	Ret	6	Ret	5	4	21
7	(United Kingdom) Kris Meeke	3	Ret	Ret	Ret	2	7	6	19
8	(Estonia) Urmo Aava	2	Ret	5	5	Ret	Ret	Ret	16
9	(Spain) Xavi Pons	Ret	3	Ret	7	5	Ret	Ret	12
10	(San Marino) Alessandro Broccoli	4	Ret	Ret	Ret	Ret	8	8	7
11	(United Kingdom) Oliver Marshall	Ret	5	8	Ret	Ret	Ret	Ret	5
12	(France) Guerlain Chicherit	Ret	Ret	4	Ret	Ret	Ret	Ret	5
13	(Finland) Jari-Matti Latvala	Ret	Ret	Ret	4	Ret	Ret	9	5
14	(Italy) Alan Scorcioni	Ret	Ret	Ret	Ret	7	10	7	4
15	(Italy) Luca Cecchettini	7	Ret	Ret	8	Ret	Ret		3
16	(Italy) Luca Betti	Ret	Ret	Ret	Ret	6	Ret	10	3
17	(Zimbabwe) Conrad Rautenbach	Ret	Ret	7	Ret	Ret	Ret	11	2
18	(Italy) Luca Tabaton	Ret	Ret	Ret	8	Ret	Ret	Ret	1
–	(France) Mathieu Biasion	9	Ret	Ret	9	Ret	Ret		–
–	(United Kingdom) Natalie Barratt	Ret	Ret	Ret	10	Ret	9	Ret	–
–	(Lebanon) Abdo Feghali	Ret							–
Pos.	Driver	MON (Monaco)	GRE (Greece)	TUR (Turkey)	FIN (Finland)	GBR (United Kingdom)	ITA (Italy)	ESP (Spain)	Pts

Key
Colour	Result
Gold	Winner
Silver	2nd place
Bronze	3rd place
Green	Points finish
Blue	Non-points finish
Blue	Non-classified finish (NC)
Purple	Did not finish (Ret)
Black	Excluded (EX)
Black	Disqualified (DSQ)
White	Did not start (DNS)
White	Cancelled (C)
Blank	Withdrew entry from the event (WD)

=== PWRC Drivers' championship ===
Pos.	Driver	SWE (Sweden)	MEX (Mexico)	NZL (New Zealand)	ARG (Argentina)	GER (Germany)	FRA (France)	AUS (Australia)	Pts
1	(United Kingdom) Niall McShea		3	Ret	4	2	2	3	35
2	(Japan) Toshihiro Arai	Ret	2	5	Ret	4		2	30
3	(Finland) Jani Paasonen	1	Ret	4	1	5		Ret	29
4	(Spain) Xavier Pons	15	5	6	Ret	1	1	1	27
5	(United Kingdom) Alister McRae	2	Ret	3		3	3	Ret	26
6	(Austria) Manfred Stohl	Ret	Ret	1	2	10		Ret	18
7	(Qatar) Nasser Al-Attiyah	7	Ret	7	3		7	5	17
8	(Spain) Daniel Solà	3	1	Ret	Ret		Ret	Ret	16
9	(Japan) Fumio Nutahara		6	Ret	Ret	Ret	5	4	13
10	(Poland) Tomasz Kuchar	4	Ret	Ret			6		8
11	(Malaysia) Karamjit Singh	10	4	8	Ret	6		Ret	8
12	(Argentina) Marcos Ligato	Ret	Ret	2	Ret		Ret	Ret	8
13	(Germany) Sebastian Vollak	13		Ret	Ret	7	10	6	6
14	(Spain) Sergio Fombona	8	Ret	9	5	Ret	Ret		5
15	(Italy) Fabio Frisiero	14		Ret	7	Ret	9	7	5
16	(United Kingdom) Mark Higgins	Ret	Ret	Ret	Ret		4	Ret	5
17	(Italy) Gianluigi Galli	5		Ret	Ret	Ret	Ret	Ret	4
18	(Bulgaria) Georgi Geradzhiev	11		10	6	8	Ret	Ret	4
19	(Mexico) Ricardo Triviño	12	7	11	Ret	9	8		3
20	(Sweden) Joakim Roman	9	8	Ret		Ret	Ret		1
Pos.	Driver	SWE (Sweden)	MEX (Mexico)	NZL (New Zealand)	ARG (Argentina)	GER (Germany)	FRA (France)	AUS (Australia)	Pts

Key
Colour	Result
Gold	Winner
Silver	2nd place
Bronze	3rd place
Green	Points finish
Blue	Non-points finish
Blue	Non-classified finish (NC)
Purple	Did not finish (Ret)
Black	Excluded (EX)
Black	Disqualified (DSQ)
White	Did not start (DNS)
White	Cancelled (C)
Blank	Withdrew entry from the event (WD)

== Events ==
Colour	Rally Surface
Gold	Gravel
Silver	Tarmac
Blue	Snow/Ice
Bronze	Mixed Surface

Round	Rally name	Podium finishers				Statistics			
Round	Rally name	Rank	Driver	Car	Time	Stages	Length	Starters	Finishers
1	(Monaco) Monte Carlo Rally (23–25 January) — Results and report	1	(France) Sébastien Loeb	Citroën Xsara WRC	4:12:03.0	15	389.12 km	43	20
1	(Monaco) Monte Carlo Rally (23–25 January) — Results and report	2	(Estonia) Markko Märtin	Ford Focus RS WRC 03	4:13:15.6	15	389.12 km	43	20
1	(Monaco) Monte Carlo Rally (23–25 January) — Results and report	3	(Belgium) François Duval	Ford Focus RS WRC 03	4:13:22.6	15	389.12 km	43	20
2	(Sweden) Swedish Rally (6–8 February) — Results and report	1	(France) Sébastien Loeb	Citroën Xsara WRC	3:26:17.7	19	394.80 km	70	49
2	(Sweden) Swedish Rally (6–8 February) — Results and report	2	(Finland) Marcus Grönholm	Peugeot 307 WRC	3:27:04.1	19	394.80 km	70	49
2	(Sweden) Swedish Rally (6–8 February) — Results and report	3	(Norway) Petter Solberg	Subaru Impreza WRC 2003	3:27:39.2	19	394.80 km	70	49
3	Rally Mexico (12–14 March) — Results and report	1	(Estonia) Markko Märtin	Ford Focus RS WRC 03	4:06:46.2	15	394.43 km	54	26
3	Rally Mexico (12–14 March) — Results and report	2	(Belgium) François Duval	Ford Focus RS WRC 03	4:07:28.7	15	394.43 km	54	26
3	Rally Mexico (12–14 March) — Results and report	3	(Spain) Carlos Sainz	Citroën Xsara WRC	4:08:07.1	15	394.43 km	54	26
4	Rally New Zealand (15–18 April) — Results and report	1	(Norway) Petter Solberg	Subaru Impreza WRC 2004	4:02:29.5	23	395.50 km	58	35
4	Rally New Zealand (15–18 April) — Results and report	2	(Finland) Marcus Grönholm	Peugeot 307 WRC	4:02:35.4	23	395.50 km	58	35
4	Rally New Zealand (15–18 April) — Results and report	3	(Estonia) Markko Märtin	Ford Focus RS WRC 04	4:02:55.1	23	395.50 km	58	35
5	Cyprus Rally (14–16 May) — Results and report	1	(France) Sébastien Loeb	Citroën Xsara WRC	4:58:44.5	18	326.68 km	37	21
5	Cyprus Rally (14–16 May) — Results and report	2	(Estonia) Markko Märtin	Ford Focus RS WRC 04	4:59:38.5	18	326.68 km	37	21
5	Cyprus Rally (14–16 May) — Results and report	3	(Spain) Carlos Sainz	Citroën Xsara WRC	4:59:53.6	18	326.68 km	37	21
6	(Greece) Acropolis Rally (3–6 June) — Results and report	1	(Norway) Petter Solberg	Subaru Impreza WRC 2004	4:39:06.2	22	377.13 km	72	33
6	(Greece) Acropolis Rally (3–6 June) — Results and report	2	(France) Sébastien Loeb	Citroën Xsara WRC	4:39:24.6	22	377.13 km	72	33
6	(Greece) Acropolis Rally (3–6 June) — Results and report	3	(Finland) Harri Rovanperä	Peugeot 307 WRC	4:39:34.5	22	377.13 km	72	33
7	Rally of Turkey (24–27 June) — Results and report	1	(France) Sébastien Loeb	Citroën Xsara WRC	4:48:26.8	17	383.33 km	63	32
7	Rally of Turkey (24–27 June) — Results and report	2	(Finland) Marcus Grönholm	Peugeot 307 WRC	4:48:53.0	17	383.33 km	63	32
7	Rally of Turkey (24–27 June) — Results and report	3	(Norway) Petter Solberg	Subaru Impreza WRC 2004	4:49:03.5	17	383.33 km	63	32
8	Rally Argentina (15–18 July) — Results and report	1	(Spain) Carlos Sainz	Citroën Xsara WRC	4:23:11.1	26	376.65 km	69	29
8	Rally Argentina (15–18 July) — Results and report	2	(France) Sébastien Loeb	Citroën Xsara WRC	4:24:43.5	26	376.65 km	69	29
8	Rally Argentina (15–18 July) — Results and report	3	(Belgium) François Duval	Ford Focus RS WRC 04	4:27:34.5	26	376.65 km	69	29
9	Rally Finland (6–8 August) — Results and report	1	(Finland) Marcus Grönholm	Peugeot 307 WRC	3:07:16.1	22	382.17 km	68	34
9	Rally Finland (6–8 August) — Results and report	2	(Estonia) Markko Märtin	Ford Focus RS WRC 04	3:07:50.8	22	382.17 km	68	34
9	Rally Finland (6–8 August) — Results and report	3	(Spain) Carlos Sainz	Citroën Xsara WRC	3:09:00.6	22	382.17 km	68	34
10	(Germany) Rallye Deutschland (20–22 August) — Results and report	1	(France) Sébastien Loeb	Citroën Xsara WRC	4:01:57.4	24	411.06 km	69	41
10	(Germany) Rallye Deutschland (20–22 August) — Results and report	2	(Belgium) François Duval	Ford Focus RS WRC 04	4:02:26.5	24	411.06 km	69	41
10	(Germany) Rallye Deutschland (20–22 August) — Results and report	3	(Spain) Carlos Sainz	Citroën Xsara WRC	4:03:06.9	24	411.06 km	69	41
11	Rally Japan (3–5 September) — Results and report	1	(Norway) Petter Solberg	Subaru Impreza WRC 2004	3:43:50.6	27	386.68 km	83	53
11	Rally Japan (3–5 September) — Results and report	2	(France) Sébastien Loeb	Citroën Xsara WRC	3:45:03.9	27	386.68 km	83	53
11	Rally Japan (3–5 September) — Results and report	3	(Estonia) Markko Märtin	Ford Focus RS WRC 04	3:45:33.9	27	386.68 km	83	53
12	(United Kingdom) Wales Rally GB (16–19 September) — Results and report	1	(Norway) Petter Solberg	Subaru Impreza WRC 2004	3:42:39.5	19	394.03 km	83	42
12	(United Kingdom) Wales Rally GB (16–19 September) — Results and report	2	(France) Sébastien Loeb	Citroën Xsara WRC	3:42:45.8	19	394.03 km	83	42
12	(United Kingdom) Wales Rally GB (16–19 September) — Results and report	3	(Estonia) Markko Märtin	Ford Focus RS WRC 04	3:45:33.2	19	394.03 km	83	42
13	(Italy) Rally d'Italia Sardegna (1–3 October) — Results and report	1	(Norway) Petter Solberg	Subaru Impreza WRC 2004	4:43:47.9	19	383.23 km	67	29
13	(Italy) Rally d'Italia Sardegna (1–3 October) — Results and report	2	(France) Sébastien Loeb	Citroën Xsara WRC	4:45:55.8	19	383.23 km	67	29
13	(Italy) Rally d'Italia Sardegna (1–3 October) — Results and report	3	(Spain) Carlos Sainz	Citroën Xsara WRC	4:47:08.8	19	383.23 km	67	29
14	(France) Tour de Corse (15–17 October) — Results and report	1	(Estonia) Markko Märtin	Ford Focus RS WRC 04	4:11:51.4	12	387.80 km	53	35
14	(France) Tour de Corse (15–17 October) — Results and report	2	(France) Sébastien Loeb	Citroën Xsara WRC	4:13:53.4	12	387.80 km	53	35
14	(France) Tour de Corse (15–17 October) — Results and report	3	(Spain) Carlos Sainz	Citroën Xsara WRC	4:14:46.7	12	387.80 km	53	35
15	(Spain) Rally Catalunya (29–31 October) — Results and report	1	(Estonia) Markko Märtin	Ford Focus RS WRC 04	3:40:43.8	20	384.08 km	52	36
15	(Spain) Rally Catalunya (29–31 October) — Results and report	2	(Finland) Marcus Grönholm	Peugeot 307 WRC	3:41:07.0	20	384.08 km	52	36
15	(Spain) Rally Catalunya (29–31 October) — Results and report	3	(Spain) Carlos Sainz	Citroën Xsara WRC	3:41:21.5	20	384.08 km	52	36
16	Rally Australia (11–14 November) — Results and report	1	(France) Sébastien Loeb	Citroën Xsara WRC	3:39:46.8	25	388.25 km	62	29
16	Rally Australia (11–14 November) — Results and report	2	(Finland) Harri Rovanperä	Peugeot 307 WRC	3:41:41.9	25	388.25 km	62	29
16	Rally Australia (11–14 November) — Results and report	3	(Belgium) François Duval	Ford Focus RS WRC 04	3:43:27.0	25	388.25 km	62	29
