= 2004 Wales Rally GB =

Rally car race

2004 Wales Rally GB 60th Wales Rally of Great Britain
Round 12 of the 2004 World Rally Championship season
← Previous event	Next event →
- Host country: Great Britain
- Rally base: Cardiff, Wales, United Kingdom
- Dates run: September 16, 2004 – September 19, 2004
- Stages: 19 (394.03 km; 244.84 miles)
- Stage surface: Gravel, mud
- Overall distance: 1,298.12 km (806.61 miles)

Statistics
- Crews: 83 at start, 42 at finish

Overall results
- Overall winner: (Norway) Petter Solberg (United Kingdom) Phil Mills (Japan) 555 Subaru World Rally Team; Subaru Impreza S10 WRC '04

The 2004 Wales Rally GB (formally the 60th Wales Rally of Great Britain) was a rallying autosports race held over four days between 16 and 19 September 2004 and operated out of Cardiff, Wales, United Kingdom. It was the twelfth round of the 2004 World Rally Championship (WRC) and the 60th running of the event. Contested over 19 stages, the rally was won by Subaru World Rally Team driver Petter Solberg. Sébastien Loeb finished second for the Citroën World Rally Team and Ford driver Markko Märtin came in third.

== Report ==
=== Background ===
The 2004 Wales Rally GB was the twelfth round of the 2004 World Rally Championship (WRC) after taking a two-week break since the previous race of the season in Japan. It was held over four days from Thursday, 16 September to Sunday, 19 September 2004. The rally headquarters was set up in Cardiff but some stages of the rally were altered. One new place the rally went to was Epynt forest with parts of the Rhondda and Resolven combined to form a new stage. The stage in Rheola returned to the event but was revised to make it faster and the rally concluded in Cardiff instead of Margam Country Park the previous year. Before the event, Sébastien Loeb led the Drivers' Championship with 84 points, ahead of Petter Solberg in second and Markko Märtin third. Carlos Sainz was fourth on 50 points, and Marcus Grönholm was three points adrift in fifth. Citroën were leading the Manufacturers' Championship with 137 points; Ford stood in second on 102 points, 33 in front of Subaru. Peugeot were fourth on 73 points and Mitsubishi rounded out the top five with 17 points. Citroën had so far been the most successful team over the course of the season with Ford claiming one victory with Märtin in México and Subaru had taken three wins apiece.

With pressure from the South Wales Police who initiated a campaign against speeding, the rally was under threat from cancellation as several drivers had been observed exceeding the local speed limit in the 2002 event, and the world governing body of motorsport, the Fédération Internationale de l'Automobile (FIA), announced it would investigate whether the roads were suitable for the large amount of rally traffic. On 12 December 2003 the Wales Rally GB was granted a provisional slot on the 2004 WRC calendar pending a formal road review by the Motor Sports Association (MSA) after the FIA chose not to downgrade the event which would have made the event illegible to count for championship points. Five towns in England were mooted as alternative bases in the event Wales was deemed unsuitable. The FIA president Max Mosley later held discussions with the chief constable of South Wales Police Barbara Wilding and the Secretary of State for Wales Peter Hain. At the FIA World Motor Sport Council meeting in Paris on 24 March, the MSA presented a traffic management report that confirmed the roads the rally used were safer than the national average. The council later confirmed that the rally would be given the go-ahead but would be monitored by FIA observers until its future as a championship round was secure.

87 crews registered to compete in the rally. The starting order for Leg 1 was "Priority 1" (P1) and P2 WRC drivers in the order of the current classification following the previous race of the 2004 season, followed by all other drivers as decided by the MSA. Solberg, the previous season's champion, set off first, followed by Loeb, then Sainz.

=== Entry list ===
No.	Driver	Co-Driver	Entrant	Car	Tyre
World Rally Championship manufacturer entries
1	(Norway) Petter Solberg	(United Kingdom) Phil Mills	(Japan) 555 Subaru World Rally Team	Subaru Impreza S10 WRC '04	P
2	(Finland) Mikko Hirvonen	(Finland) Jarmo Lehtinen	(Japan) 555 Subaru World Rally Team	Subaru Impreza S10 WRC '04	P
3	(France) Sébastien Loeb	(Monaco) Daniel Elena	(France) Citroën Total WRT	Citroën Xsara WRC	MI
4	(Spain) Carlos Sainz	(Spain) Marc Martí	(France) Citroën Total WRT	Citroën Xsara WRC	MI
5	(Finland) Marcus Grönholm	(Finland) Timo Rautiainen	(France) Marlboro Peugeot Total	Peugeot 307 WRC	MI
6	(Finland) Harri Rovanperä	(Finland) Risto Pietiläinen	(France) Marlboro Peugeot Total	Peugeot 307 WRC	MI
7	(Estonia) Markko Märtin	(United Kingdom) Michael Park	(United Kingdom) Ford Motor Co. Ltd.	Ford Focus RS WRC '04	MI
8	(Belgium) François Duval	(Belgium) Stéphane Prévot	(United Kingdom) Ford Motor Co. Ltd.	Ford Focus RS WRC '04	MI
World Rally Championship entries
11	(Germany) Armin Schwarz	(Germany) Manfred Hiemer	(Czech Republic) Škoda Motorsport	Škoda Fabia WRC	MI
12	(Finland) Toni Gardemeister	(Finland) Paavo Lukander	(Czech Republic) Škoda Motorsport	Škoda Fabia WRC	MI
14	(Finland) Janne Tuohino	(Finland) Jukka Aho	(Finland) Janne Tuohino	Ford Focus RS WRC '02	MI
15	(Sweden) Daniel Carlsson	(Sweden) Matthias Andersson	(France) Marlboro Peugeot Total	Peugeot 307 WRC	MI
16	(Austria) Manfred Stohl	(Austria) Ilka Minor	(Austria) Manfred Stohl	Peugeot 206 WRC	P
17	(Norway) Henning Solberg	(Norway) Cato Menkerud	(France) Bozian Racing	Peugeot 206 WRC	MI
18	(Finland) Jani Paasonen	(Finland) Jani Vainikka	(Czech Republic) Škoda Motorsport	Škoda Fabia WRC	MI
19	(United Kingdom) Alistair Ginley	(Republic of Ireland) Rory Kennedy	(United Kingdom) Alistair Ginley	Subaru Impreza S9 WRC '03	P
20	(Germany) Antony Warmbold	(United Kingdom) Gemma Price	(Germany) Antony Warmbold	Ford Focus RS WRC '02	MI
21	(United Kingdom) Mark Higgins	(United Kingdom) Michael Gibson	(France) M-Sport	Ford Focus RS WRC '01	MI
61	(France) Nicolas Vouilloz	(France) Denis Giraudet	(France) Bozian Racing	Peugeot 206 WRC	MI
62	(United Kingdom) Matthew Wilson	(United Kingdom) Scott Martin	(France) M-Sport	Ford Focus RS WRC '02	MI
63	(United Kingdom) Dougi Hall	(United Kingdom) Steve Egglestone	(United Kingdom) Dougi Hall	Ford Focus RS WRC '02	—N/a
64	(United Kingdom) Craig Middleton	(United Kingdom) Robin Hernaman	(United Kingdom) Craig Middleton	Hyundai Accent WRC3	—N/a
65	(United Kingdom) Steve Petch	(United Kingdom) John Richardson	(United Kingdom) Steve Petch	Hyundai Accent WRC	—N/a
69	(United Kingdom) Kevin Lynch	(Republic of Ireland) Francis Regan	(United Kingdom) Kevin Lynch	Subaru Impreza S9 WRC '03	—N/a
71	(Romania) Constantin Aur	(Romania) Adrian Berghea	(Romania) Balkan Racing	Škoda Octavia WRC Evo3	—N/a
72	(Romania) Dan Girtofan	(Romania) Dorin Pulpea	(Romania) Balkan Racing	Seat Cordoba WRC	—N/a
74	(United Kingdom) Jimmy McRae	(United Kingdom) Pauline Gullick	(United Kingdom) Jimmy McRae	Subaru Impreza 555	—N/a
83	(United Kingdom) Nigel Heath	(United Kingdom) Alec Cooper	(United Kingdom) Nigel Heath	Hyundai Accent WRC3	—N/a
84	(Greece) Yorgo Philippedes	(United Kingdom) Mark Andrews	(Greece) Yorgo Philippedes	Hyundai Accent WRC3	—N/a
105	(United Kingdom) Paul James	(United Kingdom) Derek Davies	(United Kingdom) Paul James	Mitsubishi Lancer Evo VIII MR	—N/a
JWRC entries
31	(San Marino) Mirco Baldacci	(Italy) Giovanni Bernacchini	(Japan) Suzuki Sport	Suzuki Ignis S1600	P
32	(Estonia) Urmo Aava	(Estonia) Kuldar Sikk	(Japan) Suzuki Sport	Suzuki Ignis S1600	P
33	(United Kingdom) Guy Wilks	(United Kingdom) Phil Pugh	(Japan) Suzuki Sport	Suzuki Ignis S1600	P
34	(San Marino) Alessandro Broccoli	(Italy) Giovanni Agnese	(San Marino) Sab Motorsport	Fiat Punto S1600	P
35	(Finland) Kosti Katajamäki	(Finland) Timo Alanne	(Japan) Suzuki Sport	Suzuki Ignis S1600	P
36	(United Kingdom) Kris Meeke	(United Kingdom) David Senior	(United Kingdom) McRae Motorsport	Opel Corsa S1600	P
37	(Italy) Luca Cecchettini	(Italy) Nicola Arena	(Italy) Autorel Sport	Renault Clio S1600	P
39	(France) Nicolas Bernardi	(Belgium) Jean-Marc Fortin	(France) Renault Sport	Renault Clio S1600	P
40	(France) Guerlain Chicherit	(France) Mathieu Baumel	(France) Citroën Total	Citroën Saxo S1600	P
41	(United Kingdom) Natalie Barratt	(United Kingdom) Carl Williamson	(United Kingdom) Risbridger Motorsport	Renault Clio S1600	P
42	(France) Mathieu Biasion	(France) Eric Domenech	(Italy) Power Car Team	Renault Clio S1600	P
43	(Finland) Jari-Matti Latvala	(Finland) Miikka Anttila	(Japan) Suzuki Sport	Suzuki Ignis S1600	P
44	(Italy) Alan Scorcioni	(San Marino) Silvio Stefanelli	(Italy) H.F. Grifone SRL	Fiat Punto S1600	P
45	(Sweden) Per-Gunnar Andersson	(Sweden) Jonas Andersson	(Japan) Suzuki Sport	Suzuki Ignis S1600	P
46	(Spain) Xavier Pons	(Spain) Oriol Julià Pascual	(Spain) RACC Motor Sport	Fiat Punto S1600	P
47	(Italy) Luca Tabaton	(Italy) Gisella Rovegno	(Italy) H.F. Grifone SRL	Fiat Punto S1600	P
48	(Zimbabwe) Conrad Rautenbach	(United Kingdom) Mark Jones	(United Kingdom) Birkbeck Rallysport	Opel Corsa S1600	P
49	(Italy) Luca Betti	(Italy) Michele Rosso	(Italy) Meteco Corse	Fiat Punto S1600	P
50	(United Kingdom) Oliver Marshall	(United Kingdom) Craig Parry	(United Kingdom) Prospeed Motorsport	Renault Clio S1600	P
51	(Belgium) Larry Cols	(Belgium) Filip Goddé	(France) Renault Sport	Renault Clio S1600	P

=== Itinerary ===
All dates and times are BST (UTC+1).

Date	Time	No.	Stage name	Distance
Leg 1 — 183.31 km
16 September	19:05	SS1	Cardiff Super Special 1	2.45 km
17 September	07:13	SS2	Brechfa 1	29.98 km
17 September	08:01	SS3	Trawscoed 1	27.97 km
17 September	10:09	SS4	Brechfa 2	29.98 km
17 September	10:57	SS5	Trawscoed 2	27.97 km
17 September	14:28	SS6	Rheola 1	32.48 km
17 September	17:34	SS7	Rheola 2	32.48 km
Leg 2 — 120.72 km
18 September	09:03	SS8	Crychan 1	13.45 km
18 September	09:33	SS9	Epynt 1	13.33 km
18 September	10:05	SS10	Halfway 1	18.58 km
18 September	12:05	SS11	Crychan 2	13.45 km
18 September	12:34	SS12	Epynt 2	13.33 km
18 September	13:07	SS13	Halfway 2	18.58 km
18 September	16:09	SS14	Margam 1	27.55 km
18 September	17:54	SS15	Cardiff Super Special 2	2.45 km
Leg 3 — 90.00 km
19 September	07:43	SS16	Rhondda 1	30.00 km
19 September	10:46	SS17	Rhondda 2	30.00 km
19 September	12:05	SS18	Margam 2	27.55
19 September	14:15	SS19	Cardiff Super Special 3	2.45 km

== Results ==
=== Overall ===
Pos.	No.	Driver	Co-driver	Team	Car	Time	Difference	Points
1	1	(Norway) Petter Solberg	(United Kingdom) Phil Mills	(Japan) 555 Subaru World Rally Team	Subaru Impreza S10 WRC '04	3:42:39.5		10
2	3	(France) Sébastien Loeb	(Monaco) Daniel Elena	(France) Citroën Total WRT	Citroën Xsara WRC	3:42:45.8	+6.3	8
3	7	(Estonia) Markko Märtin	(United Kingdom) Michael Park	(United Kingdom) Ford Motor Co. Ltd.	Ford Focus RS WRC '04	3:45:33.2	+2:53.7	6
4	4	(Spain) Carlos Sainz	(Spain) Marc Martí	(France) Citroën Total WRT	Citroën Xsara WRC	3:46:21.6	+3:42.1	5
5	8	(Belgium) François Duval	(Belgium) Stéphane Prévot	(United Kingdom) Ford Motor Co. Ltd.	Ford Focus RS WRC '04	3:47:20.8	+4:41.3	4
6	6	(Finland) Harri Rovanperä	(Finland) Risto Pietiläinen	(France) Marlboro Peugeot Total	Peugeot 307 WRC	3:49:24.4	+6:44.9	3
7	2	(Finland) Mikko Hirvonen	(Finland) Jarmo Lehtinen	(Japan) 555 Subaru World Rally Team	Subaru Impreza S10 WRC '04	3:49:47.8	+7:08.3	2
8	16	(Austria) Manfred Stohl	(Austria) Ilka Minor	(Austria) Manfred Stohl	Peugeot 206 WRC	3:52:59.6	+10:20.1	1

=== World Rally Cars ===
==== Classification ====
Position		No.	Driver	Co-driver	Entrant	Car	Time	Difference	Points
Event	Class	No.	Driver	Co-driver	Entrant	Car	Time	Difference	Points
1	1	1	(Norway) Petter Solberg	(United Kingdom) Phil Mills	(Japan) 555 Subaru World Rally Team	Subaru Impreza S10 WRC '04	3:42:39.5		10
2	2	3	(France) Sébastien Loeb	(Monaco) Daniel Elena	(France) Citroën Total WRT	Citroën Xsara WRC	3:42:45.8	+6.3	8
3	3	7	(Estonia) Markko Märtin	(United Kingdom) Michael Park	(United Kingdom) Ford Motor Co. Ltd.	Ford Focus RS WRC '04	3:45:33.2	+2:53.7	6
4	4	4	(Spain) Carlos Sainz	(Spain) Marc Martí	(France) Citroën Total WRT	Citroën Xsara WRC	3:46:21.6	+3:42.1	5
5	5	8	(Belgium) François Duval	(Belgium) Stéphane Prévot	(United Kingdom) Ford Motor Co. Ltd.	Ford Focus RS WRC '04	3:47:20.8	+4:41.3	4
6	6	6	(Finland) Harri Rovanperä	(Finland) Risto Pietiläinen	(France) Marlboro Peugeot Total	Peugeot 307 WRC	3:49:24.4	+6:44.9	3
7	7	2	(Finland) Mikko Hirvonen	(Finland) Jarmo Lehtinen	(Japan) 555 Subaru World Rally Team	Subaru Impreza S10 WRC '04	3:49:47.8	+7:08.3	2
Retired SS10		5	(Finland) Marcus Grönholm	(Finland) Timo Rautiainen	(France) Marlboro Peugeot Total	Peugeot 307 WRC	Accident damage		0

==== Special stages ====
Day	Stage	Stage name	Length	Winner	Car	Time	Class leaders
Leg 1 (16 Sep)	SS1	Cardiff Super Special 1	2.45 km	(Belgium) François Duval	Ford Focus RS WRC '04	2:06.5	(Belgium) François Duval
Leg 1 (17 Sep)	SS2	Brechfa 1	29.98 km	(France) Sébastien Loeb	Citroën Xsara WRC	16:43.5	(France) Sébastien Loeb
Leg 1 (17 Sep)	SS3	Trawscoed 1	27.97 km	(France) Sébastien Loeb	Citroën Xsara WRC	16:07.4	(France) Sébastien Loeb
Leg 1 (17 Sep)	SS4	Brechfa 2	29.98 km	(Finland) Marcus Grönholm	Peugeot 307 WRC	17:18.1	(France) Sébastien Loeb
Leg 1 (17 Sep)	SS5	Trawscoed 2	27.97 km	(Norway) Petter Solberg	Subaru Impreza S10 WRC '04	16:42.7	(France) Sébastien Loeb
Leg 1 (17 Sep)	SS6	Rheola 1	32.48 km	(Norway) Petter Solberg	Subaru Impreza S10 WRC '04	18:13.0	(France) Sébastien Loeb
Leg 1 (17 Sep)	SS7	Rheola 2	32.48 km	(Norway) Petter Solberg	Subaru Impreza S10 WRC '04	18:23.4	(France) Sébastien Loeb
Leg 2 (18 Sep)	SS8	Crychan 1	13.45 km	(France) Sébastien Loeb	Citroën Xsara WRC	7:29.1	(France) Sébastien Loeb
Leg 2 (18 Sep)	SS9	Epynt 1	13.33 km	(Belgium) François Duval	Ford Focus RS WRC '04	7:42.9	(France) Sébastien Loeb
Leg 2 (18 Sep)	SS10	Halfway 1	18.58 km	(France) Sébastien Loeb	Citroën Xsara WRC	10:37.1	(France) Sébastien Loeb
Leg 2 (18 Sep)	SS11	Crychan 2	13.45 km	(Norway) Petter Solberg	Subaru Impreza S10 WRC '04	7:32.8	(France) Sébastien Loeb
Leg 2 (18 Sep)	SS12	Epynt 2	13.33 km	(Belgium) François Duval	Ford Focus RS WRC '04	7:49.1	(France) Sébastien Loeb
Leg 2 (18 Sep)	SS13	Halfway 2	18.58 km	(Norway) Petter Solberg	Subaru Impreza S10 WRC '04	10:45.1	(France) Sébastien Loeb
Leg 2 (18 Sep)	SS14	Margam 1	27.55 km	(Norway) Petter Solberg	Subaru Impreza S10 WRC '04	15:06.4	(France) Sébastien Loeb
Leg 2 (18 Sep)	SS15	Cardiff Super Special 2	2.45 km	(Belgium) François Duval	Ford Focus RS WRC '04	2:07.1	(France) Sébastien Loeb
Leg 3 (19 Sep)	SS16	Rhondda 1	30.00 km	(France) Sébastien Loeb	Citroën Xsara WRC	15:08.6	(France) Sébastien Loeb
Leg 3 (19 Sep)	SS17	Rhondda 2	30.00 km	(Norway) Petter Solberg	Subaru Impreza S10 WRC '04	14:51.1	(France) Sébastien Loeb
Leg 3 (19 Sep)	SS18	Margam 2	27.55	(Norway) Petter Solberg	Subaru Impreza S10 WRC '04	15:06.7	(Norway) Petter Solberg
Leg 3 (19 Sep)	SS19	Cardiff Super Special 3	2.45 km	(Estonia) Markko Märtin	Ford Focus RS WRC '04	2:04.8	(Norway) Petter Solberg

==== Championship standings ====
Pos.	Drivers' championships			Co-drivers' championships			Manufacturers' championships		
Pos.	Move	Driver	Points	Move	Co-driver	Points	Move	Manufacturer	Points
1		(France) Sébastien Loeb	92		(Monaco) Daniel Elena	92		(France) Citroën Total WRT	150
2		(Norway) Petter Solberg	64		(United Kingdom) Phil Mills	64		(United Kingdom) Ford Motor Co. Ltd.	112
3		(Estonia) Markko Märtin	59		(United Kingdom) Michael Park	59		(Japan) 555 Subaru World Rally Team	91
4		(Spain) Carlos Sainz	55		(Spain) Marc Martí	55		(France) Marlboro Peugeot Total	76
5		(Finland) Marcus Grönholm	47		(Finland) Timo Rautiainen	47		(Japan) Mitsubishi Motors	17

=== Junior World Rally Championship ===
==== Classification ====
Position		No.	Driver	Co-driver	Entrant	Car	Time	Difference	Points
Event	Class	No.	Driver	Co-driver	Entrant	Car	Time	Difference	Points
18	1	33	(United Kingdom) Guy Wilks	(United Kingdom) Phil Pugh	(Japan) Suzuki Sport	Suzuki Ignis S1600	4:16:25.6		10
20	2	36	(United Kingdom) Kris Meeke	(United Kingdom) David Senior	(United Kingdom) McRae Motorsport	Opel Corsa S1600	4:18:26.2	+2:00.6	8
21	3	35	(Finland) Kosti Katajamäki	(Finland) Timo Alanne	(Japan) Suzuki Sport	Suzuki Ignis S1600	4:19:05.1	+2:39.5	6
23	4	43	(Finland) Jari-Matti Latvala	(Finland) Miikka Anttila	(Japan) Suzuki Sport	Suzuki Ignis S1600	4:26:13.4	+9:47.8	5
24	5	46	(Spain) Xavier Pons	(Spain) Oriol Julià Pascual	(Spain) RACC Motor Sport	Fiat Punto S1600	4:29:24.6	+12:59.0	4
26	6	49	(Italy) Luca Betti	(Italy) Michele Rosso	(Italy) Meteco Corse	Fiat Punto S1600	4:32:53.6	+16:28.0	3
32	7	44	(Italy) Alan Scorcioni	(San Marino) Silvio Stefanelli	(Italy) H.F. Grifone SRL	Fiat Punto S1600	4:44:48.1	+28:22.5	2
34	8	47	(Italy) Luca Tabaton	(Italy) Gisella Rovegno	(Italy) H.F. Grifone SRL	Fiat Punto S1600	4:46:01.3	+29:35.7	1
Retired SS16		31	(San Marino) Mirco Baldacci	(Italy) Giovanni Bernacchini	(Japan) Suzuki Sport	Suzuki Ignis S1600	Accident		0
Retired SS11		45	(Sweden) Per-Gunnar Andersson	(Sweden) Jonas Andersson	(Japan) Suzuki Sport	Suzuki Ignis S1600	Brakes		0
Retired SS9		41	(United Kingdom) Natalie Barratt	(United Kingdom) Carl Williamson	(United Kingdom) Risbridger Motorsport	Renault Clio S1600	Engine		0
Retired SS8		34	(San Marino) Alessandro Broccoli	(Italy) Giovanni Agnese	(San Marino) Sab Motorsport	Fiat Punto S1600	Engine		0
Retired SS8		50	(United Kingdom) Oliver Marshall	(United Kingdom) Craig Parry	(United Kingdom) Prospeed Motorsport	Renault Clio S1600	Engine mounting		0
Retired SS8		51	(Belgium) Larry Cols	(Belgium) Filip Goddé	(France) Renault Sport	Renault Clio S1600	Excluded		0
Retired SS7		37	(Italy) Luca Cecchettini	(Italy) Nicola Arena	(Italy) Autorel Sport	Renault Clio S1600	Steering		0
Retired SS7		39	(France) Nicolas Bernardi	(Belgium) Jean-Marc Fortin	(France) Renault Sport	Renault Clio S1600	Accident		0
Retired SS7		40	(France) Guerlain Chicherit	(France) Mathieu Baumel	(France) Citroën Total	Citroën Saxo S1600	Accident		0
Retired SS6		42	(France) Mathieu Biasion	(France) Eric Domenech	(Italy) Power Car Team	Renault Clio S1600	Accident		0
Retired SS4		32	(Estonia) Urmo Aava	(Estonia) Kuldar Sikk	(Japan) Suzuki Sport	Suzuki Ignis S1600	Accident		0
Retired SS2		48	(Zimbabwe) Conrad Rautenbach	(United Kingdom) Mark Jones	(United Kingdom) Birkbeck Rallysport	Opel Corsa S1600	Gearbox		0

==== Special stages ====
Day	Stage	Stage name	Length	Winner	Car	Time	Class leaders
Leg 1 (16 Sep)	SS1	Cardiff Super Special 1	2.45 km	(Sweden) Per-Gunnar Andersson	Suzuki Ignis S1600	2:19.9	(Sweden) Per-Gunnar Andersson
Leg 1 (17 Sep)	SS2	Brechfa 1	29.98 km	(United Kingdom) Guy Wilks	Suzuki Ignis S1600	19:37.9	(United Kingdom) Guy Wilks
Leg 1 (17 Sep)	SS3	Trawscoed 1	27.97 km	(San Marino) Mirco Baldacci	Suzuki Ignis S1600	18:51.3	(San Marino) Mirco Baldacci
Leg 1 (17 Sep)	SS4	Brechfa 2	29.98 km	(France) Nicolas Bernardi	Renault Clio S1600	20:00.2	(San Marino) Mirco Baldacci
Leg 1 (17 Sep)	SS5	Trawscoed 2	27.97 km	(San Marino) Mirco Baldacci	Suzuki Ignis S1600	19:16.4	(San Marino) Mirco Baldacci
Leg 1 (17 Sep)	SS6	Rheola 1	32.48 km	(San Marino) Mirco Baldacci	Suzuki Ignis S1600	20:49.7	(San Marino) Mirco Baldacci
Leg 1 (17 Sep)	SS7	Rheola 2	32.48 km	(San Marino) Mirco Baldacci	Suzuki Ignis S1600	21:01.2	(San Marino) Mirco Baldacci
Leg 2 (18 Sep)	SS8	Crychan 1	13.45 km	(Sweden) Per-Gunnar Andersson	Suzuki Ignis S1600	8:31.7	(San Marino) Mirco Baldacci
Leg 2 (18 Sep)	SS9	Epynt 1	13.33 km	(Sweden) Per-Gunnar Andersson	Suzuki Ignis S1600	8:51.6	(San Marino) Mirco Baldacci
Leg 2 (18 Sep)	SS10	Halfway 1	18.58 km	(San Marino) Mirco Baldacci	Suzuki Ignis S1600	11:52.0	(San Marino) Mirco Baldacci
Leg 2 (18 Sep)	SS11	Crychan 2	13.45 km	(United Kingdom) Kris Meeke	Opel Corsa S1600	8:32.8	(San Marino) Mirco Baldacci
Leg 2 (18 Sep)	SS12	Epynt 2	13.33 km	(United Kingdom) Guy Wilks	Suzuki Ignis S1600	9:02.4	(San Marino) Mirco Baldacci
Leg 2 (18 Sep)	SS13	Halfway 2	18.58 km	(United Kingdom) Kris Meeke	Opel Corsa S1600	11:58.2	(San Marino) Mirco Baldacci
Leg 2 (18 Sep)	SS14	Margam 1	27.55 km	(United Kingdom) Guy Wilks	Suzuki Ignis S1600	17:20.3	(San Marino) Mirco Baldacci
Leg 2 (18 Sep)	SS15	Cardiff Super Special 2	2.45 km	(United Kingdom) Kris Meeke	Opel Corsa S1600	2:21.2	(San Marino) Mirco Baldacci
Leg 3 (19 Sep)	SS16	Rhondda 1	30.00 km	(United Kingdom) Kris Meeke	Opel Corsa S1600	17:11.1	(United Kingdom) Guy Wilks
Leg 3 (19 Sep)	SS17	Rhondda 2	30.00 km	(United Kingdom) Kris Meeke	Opel Corsa S1600	17:07.4	(United Kingdom) Guy Wilks
Leg 3 (19 Sep)	SS18	Margam 2	27.55	(United Kingdom) Kris Meeke	Opel Corsa S1600	17:34.1	(United Kingdom) Guy Wilks
Leg 3 (19 Sep)	SS19	Cardiff Super Special 3	2.45 km	(United Kingdom) Kris Meeke	Opel Corsa S1600	2:18.4	(United Kingdom) Guy Wilks

==== Championship standings ====
Pos.	Drivers' championships		
Pos.	Move	Driver	Points
1	2	(United Kingdom) Guy Wilks	26
2	1	(France) Nicolas Bernardi	24
3	1	(Finland) Kosti Katajamäki	22
4	2	(Sweden) Per-Gunnar Andersson	21
5		(Estonia) Urmo Aava	16

Previous event: 2004 Rally Japan	FIA World Rally Championship, 2004 season	Next event: 2004 Rally d'Italia Sardegna
Previous year: 2003 Wales Rally GB	Wales Rally GB	Next year: 2005 Wales Rally GB
