= Guy Wilks =

British rally driver (born 1981)

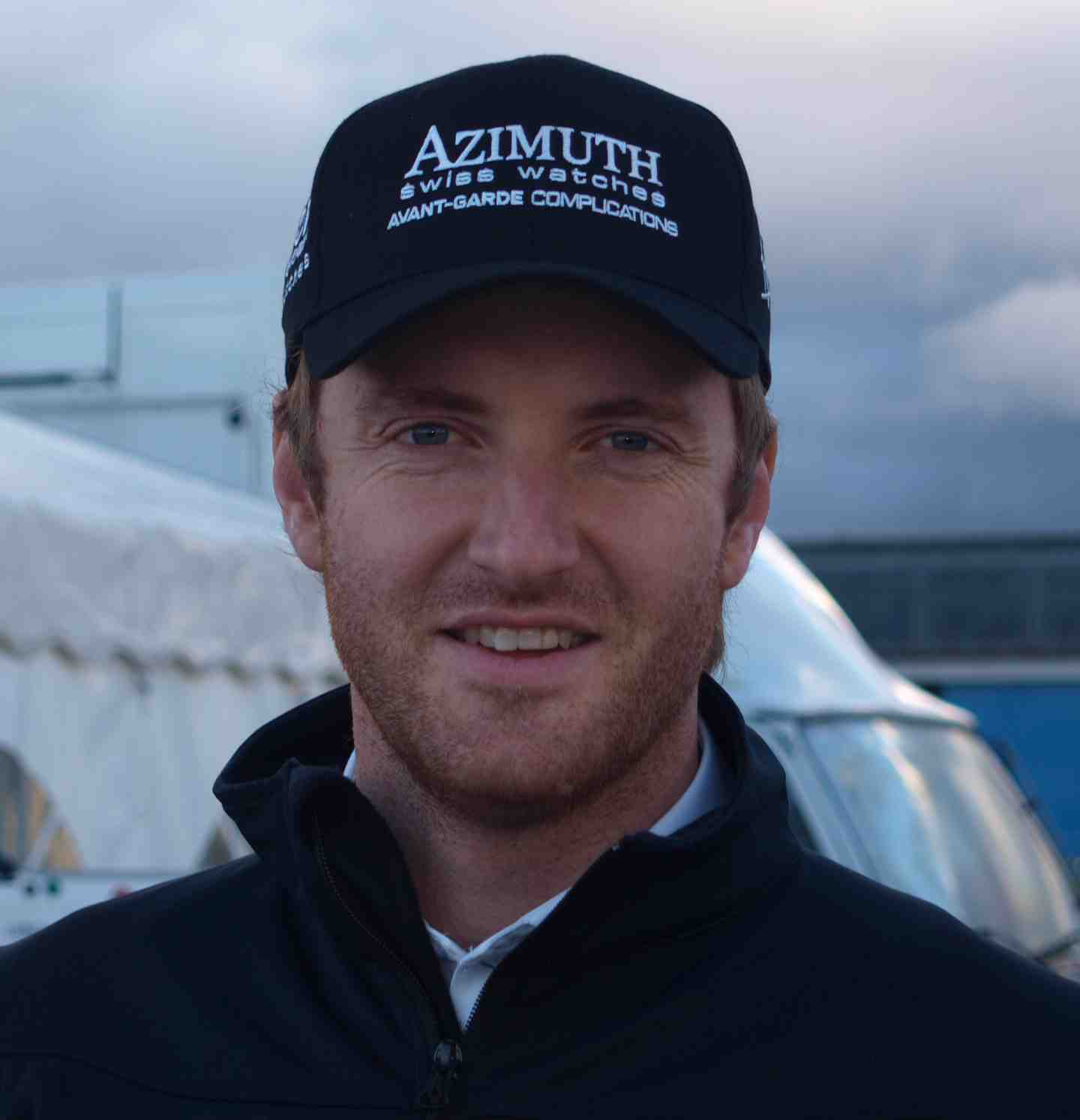
- Guy before the start of the 2010 Rally Scotland
- Nationality: (United Kingdom) British
- Born: 22 January 1981 (age 45)

FIA World Rallycross Championship career
- Debut season: 2015
- Current team: LOCO Energy World RX
- Car number: 100
- Former teams: JRM Racing
- Starts: 13
- Wins: 0
- Podiums: 0
- Best finish: 15th in 2017
Guy Wilks
World Rally Championship record
- Years active: 2002–2008
- Co-driver: (United Kingdom) Roger Herron (United Kingdom) Phil Pugh (Republic of Ireland) David Moynihan
- Teams: Skoda, Mitsubishi, Ford, Suzuki
- Rallies: 45
- Championships: 0
- Rally wins: 0
- Podiums: 0
- Stage wins: 0
- Total points: 3
- First rally: 2002 Swedish Rally
- Last rally: 2008 Rally GB

Guy Wilks (born 22 January 1981) is a British rally driver. Wilks started rallying at the age of 19, but currently drives for JRM in the FIA World Rallycross Championship. In 2011 Wilks drove for Peugeot UK in the Intercontinental Rally Challenge. In 2012 he did not compete.

== Career ==
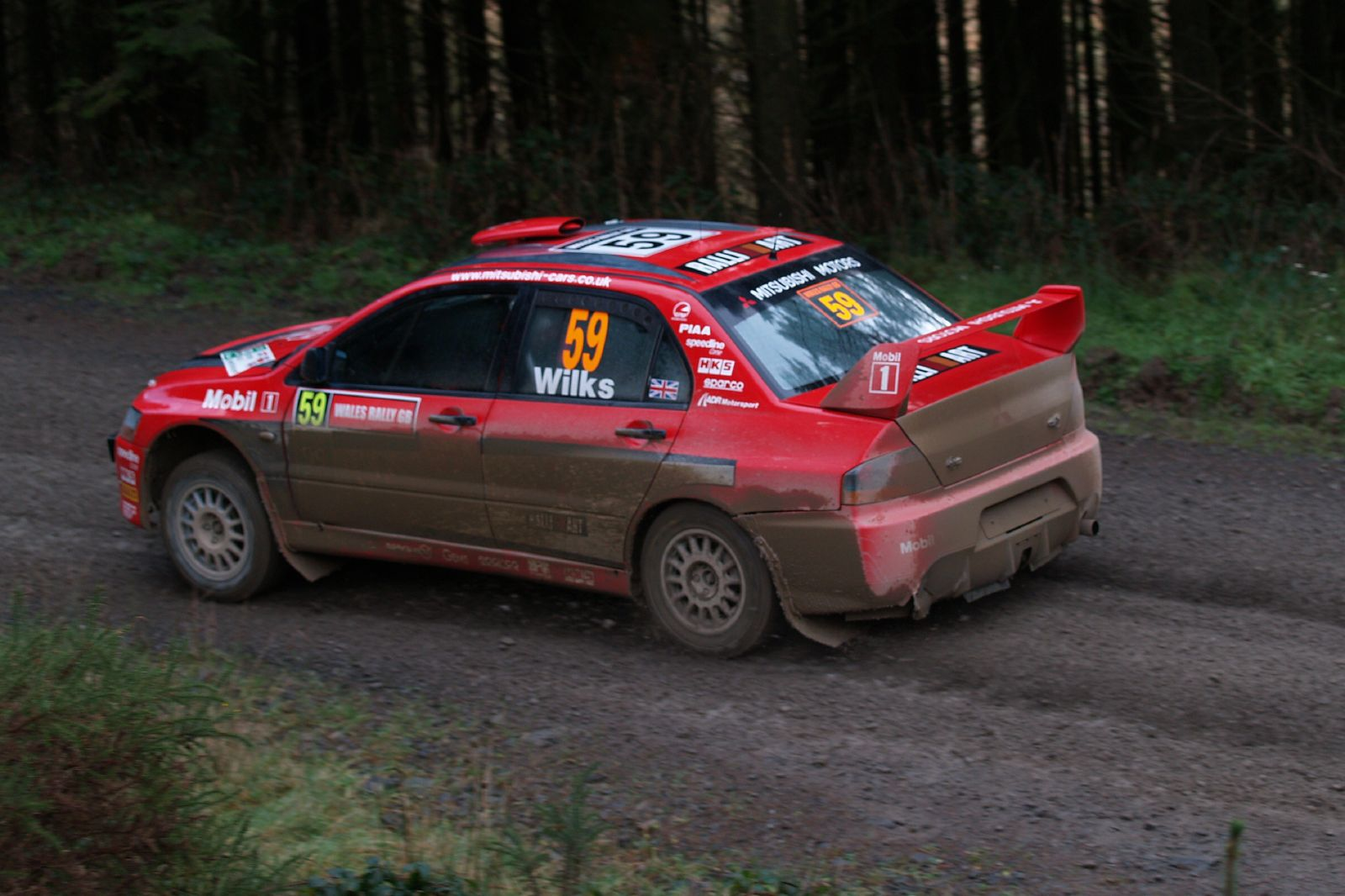
Wilks driving his Mitsubishi Lancer Evolution at the 2007 Wales Rally GB.

Wilks who was born in Bishop Auckland, County Durham became Ford Ka Junior Champion in 2000 in his first year in the sport, graduating within the Ford 'Ladder of Opportunity' scheme to the Puma 1400 series for 2001. He finished second in the championship. The following year Wilks entered the British Rally Championship (BRC) in a Super 1600 specification Puma, finishing fifth overall in the championship and third in the British Super1600 Rally Championship. In 2003 Wilks competed in the Junior World Rally Championship (JWRC) driving a Ford Puma prepared by Chris Birkbeck Motorsport finishing seventh in the standings. Wilks missed out on an opportunity to join the Subaru World Rally Team for the 2004 season, as he had signed a contract with Suzuki.

For 2004, Wilks made the switch from Ford to a works entry in the JWRC with Suzuki driving an Ignis alongside Per-Gunnar Andersson. Over the next three years Wilks won five rallies and finished second in the JWRC in 2005. Wins included his first JWRC victory at the Acropolis Rally in 2004 and Rally GB in the same year. During his time driving for Suzuki Wilks also won the British Super 1600 title and British Junior title in 2005.

Wilks split with Suzuki at the end of 2006 as they moved their focus to a full-fledged enter in World Rally Championship (WRC). In 2007 Wilks joined the Mitsubishi Motors UK Works team driving a Group N specification Mitsubishi Lancer Evolution IX in the BRC. Over the next two years Wilks won eight rallies and the BRC title outright.

In addition to the BRC in 2007, Wilks also competed in a number of WRC events with Mobil 1 support allowing him to make his World Rally Car debut in Norway driving a Ford Focus 03 WRC. In total he competed in seven events with a sixth place in Rally Ireland his best finish in a Subaru S11 WRC.

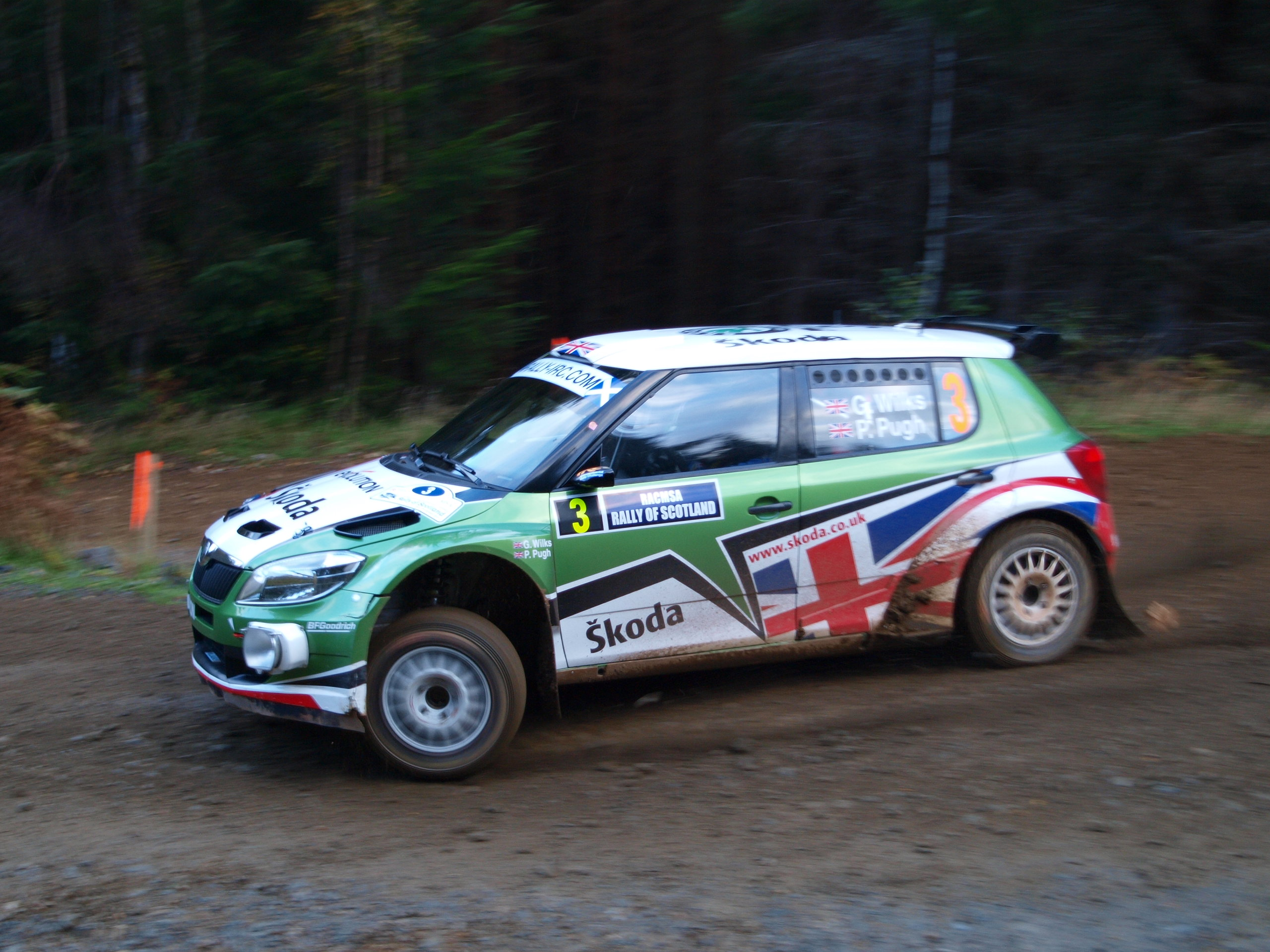
Wilks in the Škoda Fabia at the 2010 Rally Scotland.

2008 saw Wilks supplement his BRC commitments with several outings in a Honda Civic Type R R3 rally car for Italy's JAS Motorsport.

Wilks made the switch in 2009 to S2000 class rallying with Mellors Elliot Motorsport driving a Proton Satria Neo Super 2000 car in the Pirelli International Rally. Then, on 6 June 2009, Proton announced an entry for Wilks in the Intercontinental Rally Challenge (IRC). He competed in six events with Proton before making the switch to drive for Škoda UK in Rally Scotland which he won.

On 12 January 2010, it was announced that Wilks would compete on selected rounds of the 2010 IRC driving a Škoda Fabia S2000 for Škoda UK. In the first four rallies of the season, Guy finished 6th in Rallye Monte-Carlo, 2nd in Rally Internacional de Curitiba, 2nd in Rally Argentina and 3rd in Rally Islas Canarias.

During the first stage of the 2010 Rally d'Italia Sardegna, Wilks crashed his Škoda and was flown to hospital after reporting pains in his lower back. Hospital checks found the Wilks had fractures to his first and second lumbar vertebrae. The injury meant that Wilks missed three events on the IRC Calendar making a comeback at the Barum Czech Rally Zlín at the end of August.

It was confirmed that Wilks, who finished the year in sixth overall in the championship, would make the switch from Škoda to the Kronos Racing run Peugeot UK Team for the 2011 IRC.

== Racing record ==
=== Complete WRC results ===
(key)

Year	Entrant	Car	1	2	3	4	5	6	7	8	9	10	11	12	13	14	15	16	WDC	Points
2002	Guy Wilks	Mitsubishi Lancer Evo VI	MON	SWE; Ret	FRA	ESP	CYP	ARG	GRE	KEN	FIN								NC	0
2002	Guy Wilks	Ford Puma S1600										GER; Ret	ITA	NZL	AUS	GBR; 29			NC	0
2003	Guy Wilks	Ford Puma S1600	MON; Ret	SWE	TUR; 18	NZL	ARG	GRE; 33	CYP	GER	FIN; 24	AUS	ITA; 28	FRA	ESP; 33	GBR; Ret			NC	0
2004	Guy Wilks	Suzuki Ignis S1600	MON; Ret	SWE	MEX	NZL	CYP	GRE; 12	TUR; 13	ARG	FIN; Ret	GER	JPN	GBR; 18	ITA; 11	FRA	ESP; Ret	AUS	NC	0
2005	Guy Wilks	Suzuki Ignis S1600	MON; 19	SWE; 22	MEX; 11	NZL; 27	ITA; 23	CYP; 29	TUR; 52	GRE; 17	ARG								NC	0
2005	Guy Wilks	Suzuki Swift S1600										FIN; 18	GER; 15	GBR; 32	JPN; 17	FRA	ESP; Ret	AUS	NC	0
2006	Guy Wilks	Suzuki Swift S1600	MON	SWE; 38	MEX	ESP	FRA	ARG; 19	ITA; 26	GRE	GER	FIN; 15	JPN	CYP	TUR; 19	AUS	NZL	GBR; 52	NC	0
2007	Ramsport	Ford Focus RS WRC 04	MON	SWE	NOR; Ret	MEX	POR; Ret	ARG	ITA	GRE; 9	FIN; 9	GER; 10	NZL	ESP	FRA	JPN			18th	3
2007	Guy Wilks	Subaru Impreza WRC 05															IRE; 6		18th	3
2007	Mitsubishi Motors UK	Mitsubishi Lancer Evo IX																GBR; 13	18th	3
2008	JAS Motorsport	Honda Civic Type-R R3	MON	SWE	MEX	ARG	JOR	ITA	GRE	TUR	FIN; 18	GER	NZL	ESP	FRA	JPN			NC	0
2008	Mitsubishi Motors UK	Mitsubishi Lancer Evo IX															GBR; 14		NC	0

=== JWRC results ===
(key)

Year	Entrant	Car	1	2	3	4	5	6	7	8	9	JWRC	Points
2003	Guy Wilks	Ford Puma S1600	MON; Ret	TUR; 3	GRE; 6	FIN; 3	ITA; 6	ESP; 11	GBR; Ret			7th	18
2004	Guy Wilks	Suzuki Ignis S1600	MON; Ret	GRE; 1	TUR; 3	FIN; Ret	GBR; 1	ITA; 2	ESP; Ret			3rd	34
2005	Guy Wilks	Suzuki Ignis S1600	MON; 7	MEX; 1	ITA; 6	GRE; 2						2nd	35
2005	Guy Wilks	Suzuki Swift S1600					FIN; 3	GER; 3	FRA	ESP; Ret		2nd	35
2006	Guy Wilks	Suzuki Swift S1600	SWE; 9	ESP	FRA	ARG; 1	ITA; 8	GER	FIN; 1	TUR; 4	GBR; 11	4th	26

=== PWRC results ===
(key)

Year	Entrant	Car	1	2	3	4	5	6	7	8	PWRC	Points
2007	Mitsubishi Motors UK	Mitsubishi Lancer Evo IX	SWE	MEX	ARG	GRE	NZL	JPN	IRE	GBR; 1	12th	10
2008	Mitsubishi Motors UK	Mitsubishi Lancer Evo IX	SWE	ARG	GRE	TUR	FIN	NZL	JPN	GBR; 3	18th	6

=== Complete IRC results ===
(key)

Year	Entrant	Car	1	2	3	4	5	6	7	8	9	10	11	12	WDC	Points
2009	Mellors Elliot Motorsport	Proton Satria Neo S2000	MON	BRA	KEN	POR	BEL; Ret	RUS; 5	POR; 11	CZE; Ret	ESP; 22	ITA; 13			7th	15
2009	Philip Pugh	Škoda Fabia S2000											SCO; 1		7th	15
2010	Škoda UK	Škoda Fabia S2000	MON; 6	CUR; 2	ARG; 2	CAN; 3	SAR; Ret	YPR	AZO	MAD	ZLI; 7	SAN; Ret	SCO; Ret	CYP	6th	27
2011	Peugeot UK	Peugeot 207 S2000	MON; 3	CAN; 5	COR; Ret	YAL; 5	YPR; 4	AZO; Ret	ZLI; Ret	MEC; Ret	SAN; Ret	SCO; Ret	CYP		7th	47

=== Complete FIA World Rallycross Championship results ===
(key)

==== Supercar ====
Year	Entrant	Car	1	2	3	4	5	6	7	8	9	10	11	12	13	WRX	Points
2015	JRM Racing	Mini Countryman RX	POR	HOC	BEL	GBR; 6	GER	SWE	CAN	NOR	FRA; 33	BAR	TUR	ITA	ARG	23rd	14
2016	Guy Wilks	Ford Fiesta ST	POR	HOC	BEL	GBR; 18	NOR	SWE	CAN	FRA						23rd	3
2016	JRM Racing	Mini Countryman RX									BAR; 13	LAT; 14	GER	ARG		23rd	3
2017	LOCO Energy World RX	Volkswagen Polo	BAR; 7	POR; 16	HOC; 19	BEL; 14	GBR; 14	NOR; 17	SWE; 20	CAN; 15	FRA	LAT	GER	RSA		15th	21

Awards and achievements
Preceded by Martin Rowe	Autosport; National Rally Driver of the Year; 2004	Succeeded by Mark Higgins
