= 2004 Rally Finland =

Motor rally competition

2004 Rally Finland 54th Neste Rally Finland
Round 9 of the 2004 World Rally Championship season
← Previous event	Next event →
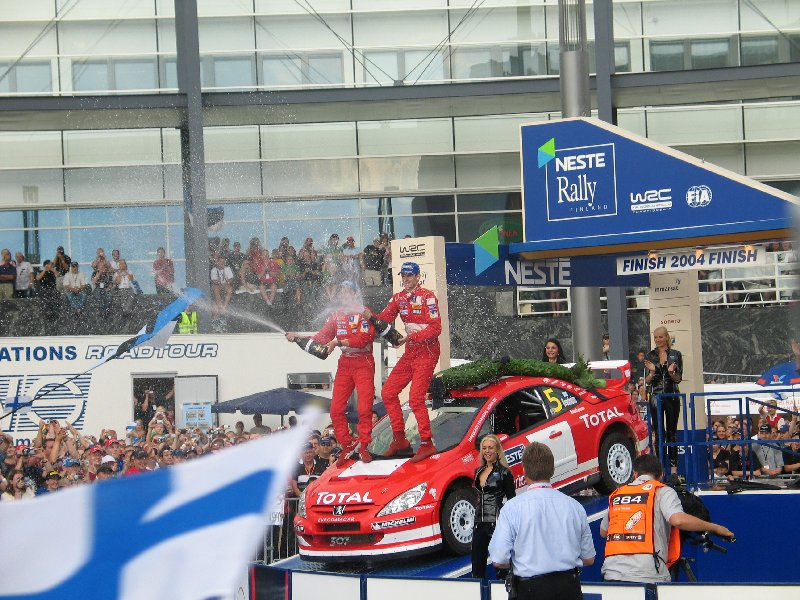
- Marcus Grönholm and Timo Rautiainen celebrating their victory.
- Host country: Finland
- Rally base: Jyväskylä
- Dates run: August 6, 2004 – August 8, 2004
- Stages: 22 (382.71 km; 237.80 miles)
- Stage surface: Gravel
- Overall distance: 1,577.16 km (980.00 miles)

Statistics
- Crews: 68 at start, 34 at finish

Overall results
- Overall winner: (Finland) Marcus Grönholm (Finland) Timo Rautiainen (France) Marlboro Peugeot Total

The 2004 Rally Finland (formally the 54th Neste Rally Finland) was the ninth round of the 2004 World Rally Championship season and was held between 6 and 8 August 2004. The rally was based in Jyväskylä. Peugeot's Marcus Grönholm won the race, his 16th win in the World Rally Championship.

== Background ==
=== Entry list ===
No.	Driver	Co-Driver	Entrant	Car	Tyre
World Rally Championship manufacturer entries
1	(Norway) Petter Solberg	(United Kingdom) Phil Mills	(Japan) 555 Subaru World Rally Team	Subaru Impreza S10 WRC '04	P
2	(Finland) Mikko Hirvonen	(Finland) Jarmo Lehtinen	(Japan) 555 Subaru World Rally Team	Subaru Impreza S10 WRC '04	P
3	(France) Sébastien Loeb	(Monaco) Daniel Elena	(France) Citroën Total WRT	Citroën Xsara WRC	MI
4	(Spain) Carlos Sainz	(Spain) Marc Martí	(France) Citroën Total WRT	Citroën Xsara WRC	MI
5	(Finland) Marcus Grönholm	(Finland) Timo Rautiainen	(France) Marlboro Peugeot Total	Peugeot 307 WRC	MI
6	(Finland) Harri Rovanperä	(Finland) Risto Pietiläinen	(France) Marlboro Peugeot Total	Peugeot 307 WRC	MI
7	(Estonia) Markko Märtin	(United Kingdom) Michael Park	(United Kingdom) Ford Motor Co. Ltd.	Ford Focus RS WRC '04	MI
8	(Finland) Janne Tuohino	(Finland) Jukka Aho	(United Kingdom) Ford Motor Co. Ltd.	Ford Focus RS WRC '04	MI
9	(France) Gilles Panizzi	(France) Hervé Panizzi	(Japan) Mitsubishi Motors	Mitsubishi Lancer WRC 04	MI
10	(Finland) Kristian Sohlberg	(Finland) Kaj Lindström	(Japan) Mitsubishi Motors	Mitsubishi Lancer WRC 04	MI
World Rally Championship entries
11	(Germany) Armin Schwarz	(Germany) Manfred Hiemer	(Czech Republic) Škoda Motorsport	Škoda Fabia WRC	MI
12	(Finland) Toni Gardemeister	(Finland) Paavo Lukander	(Czech Republic) Škoda Motorsport	Škoda Fabia WRC	MI
14	(Finland) Sebastian Lindholm	(Finland) Tomi Tuominen	(France) Marlboro Peugeot Total	Peugeot 307 WRC	MI
15	(Belgium) François Duval	(Belgium) Stéphane Prévot	(United Kingdom) Ford Motor Co. Ltd.	Ford Focus RS WRC '04	MI
16	(Finland) Jani Paasonen	(Finland) Jani Vainikka	(Czech Republic) Škoda Motorsport	Škoda Fabia WRC	MI
17	(Sweden) Daniel Carlsson	(Sweden) Matthias Andersson	(France) Bozian Racing	Peugeot 206 WRC	MI
18	(Norway) Henning Solberg	(Norway) Cato Menkerud	(France) Bozian Racing	Peugeot 206 WRC	MI
19	(United Kingdom) Alistair Ginley	(Republic of Ireland) Rory Kennedy	(United Kingdom) Alistair Ginley	Subaru Impreza S9 WRC '03	P
20	(Germany) Antony Warmbold	(United Kingdom) Gemma Price	(Germany) Antony Warmbold	Ford Focus RS WRC '02	MI
21	(Finland) Juuso Pykälistö	(Finland) Mika Ovaskainen	(France) Kronos Racing	Citroën Xsara WRC	—N/a
22	(Finland) Jari Viita	(Finland) Timo Hantunen	(Finland) Jari Viita	Ford Focus RS WRC '03	MI
65	(Hungary) Tamás Tagai	(Hungary) Róbert Tagai	(Hungary) Tamás Tagai	Škoda Octavia WRC Evo3	P
85	(Italy) Fabrizio De Sanctis	(Italy) Enrico Zoppi	(Italy) Fabrizio De Sanctis	Mitsubishi Lancer Evo VI	—N/a
JWRC entries
31	(San Marino) Mirco Baldacci	(Italy) Giovanni Bernacchini	(Japan) Suzuki Sport	Suzuki Ignis S1600	P
32	(Estonia) Urmo Aava	(Estonia) Kuldar Sikk	(Japan) Suzuki Sport	Suzuki Ignis S1600	P
33	(United Kingdom) Guy Wilks	(United Kingdom) Phil Pugh	(Japan) Suzuki Sport	Suzuki Ignis S1600	P
34	(San Marino) Alessandro Broccoli	(Italy) Giovanni Agnese	(San Marino) Sab Motorsport	Fiat Punto S1600	P
35	(Finland) Kosti Katajamäki	(Finland) Timo Alanne	(Japan) Suzuki Sport	Suzuki Ignis S1600	P
36	(United Kingdom) Kris Meeke	(United Kingdom) Chris Patterson	(United Kingdom) McRae Motorsport	Opel Corsa S1600	P
37	(Italy) Luca Cecchettini	(Italy) Nicola Arena	(Italy) Autorel Sport	Renault Clio S1600	P
39	(France) Nicolas Bernardi	(Belgium) Jean-Marc Fortin	(France) Renault Sport	Renault Clio S1600	P
40	(France) Guerlain Chicherit	(France) Mathieu Baumel	(France) Citroën Total	Citroën Saxo S1600	P
41	(United Kingdom) Natalie Barratt	(United Kingdom) Carl Williamson	(United Kingdom) Risbridger Motorsport	Renault Clio S1600	P
42	(France) Mathieu Biasion	(France) Eric Domenech	(Italy) Power Car Team	Renault Clio S1600	P
43	(Finland) Jari-Matti Latvala	(Finland) Miikka Anttila	(Japan) Suzuki Sport	Suzuki Ignis S1600	P
44	(Italy) Alan Scorcioni	(Italy) Massimo Daddoveri	(Italy) H.F. Grifone SRL	Fiat Punto S1600	P
45	(Sweden) Per-Gunnar Andersson	(Sweden) Jonas Andersson	(Japan) Suzuki Sport	Suzuki Ignis S1600	P
46	(Spain) Xavier Pons	(Spain) Oriol Julià Pascual	(Spain) RACC Motor Sport	Fiat Punto S1600	P
47	(Italy) Luca Tabaton	(Italy) Gisella Rovegno	(Italy) H.F. Grifone SRL	Fiat Punto S1600	P
48	(Zimbabwe) Conrad Rautenbach	(United Kingdom) Mark Jones	(United Kingdom) Birkbeck Rallysport	Opel Corsa S1600	P
49	(Italy) Luca Betti	(Italy) Paolo Del Grande	(Italy) Meteco Corse	Peugeot 206 S1600	P
50	(United Kingdom) Oliver Marshall	(United Kingdom) Craig Parry	(United Kingdom) Prospeed Motorsport	Renault Clio S1600	P
51	(Belgium) Larry Cols	(Belgium) Filip Goddé	(France) Renault Sport	Renault Clio S1600	P

=== Itinerary ===
All dates and times are EEST (UTC+3).

Date	Time	No.	Stage name	Distance
Leg 1 — 119.65 km
6 August	08:34	SS1	Kuohu 1	7.76 km
6 August	08:57	SS2	Parkkola 1	14.95 km
6 August	09:38	SS3	Mökkiperä 1	13.96 km
6 August	12:44	SS4	Lankamaa	24.86 km
6 August	13:32	SS5	Laukaa	11.82 km
6 August	14:27	SS6	Ruuhimäki	7.57 km
6 August	16:40	SS7	Kuohu 2	7.76 km
6 August	17:03	SS8	Parkkola 2	14.95 km
6 August	17:44	SS9	Mökkiperä 2	13.96 km
6 August	19:26	SS10	Killeri 1	2.06 km
Leg 2 — 167.80 km
7 August	07:06	SS11	Vaheri	24.15 km
7 August	08:19	SS12	Ouninpohja 1	33.24 km
7 August	11:43	SS13	Urria	10.00 km
7 August	13:06	SS14	Ouninpohja 2	33.24 km
7 August	14:14	SS15	Ehikki	11.34 km
7 August	17:20	SS16	Moksi — Leustu	40.96 km
7 August	18:32	SS17	Himos	12.81 km
7 August	20:40	SS18	Killeri 2	2.06 km
Leg 3 — 98.50 km
8 August	08:36	SS19	Jukojärvi 1	22.31 km
8 August	09:07	SS20	Kruununperä 1	25.32 km
8 August	12:28	SS21	Jukojärvi 2	22.31 km
8 August	12:59	SS22	Kruununperä 2	25.32 km

== Results ==
=== Overall ===
Pos.	No.	Driver	Co-driver	Team	Car	Time	Difference	Points
1	5	(Finland) Marcus Grönholm	(Finland) Timo Rautiainen	(France) Marlboro Peugeot Total	Peugeot 307 WRC	3:07:16.1		10
2	7	(Estonia) Markko Märtin	(United Kingdom) Michael Park	(United Kingdom) Ford Motor Co. Ltd.	Ford Focus RS WRC '04	3:07:50.8	+34.7	8
3	4	(Spain) Carlos Sainz	(Spain) Marc Martí	(France) Citroën Total WRT	Citroën Xsara WRC	3:09:00.6	+1:44.5	6
4	3	(France) Sébastien Loeb	(Monaco) Daniel Elena	(France) Citroën Total WRT	Citroën Xsara WRC	3:09:39.4	+2:23.3	5
5	8	(Finland) Janne Tuohino	(Finland) Jukka Aho	(United Kingdom) Ford Motor Co. Ltd.	Ford Focus RS WRC '04	3:09:52.8	+2:36.7	4
6	16	(Finland) Jani Paasonen	(Finland) Jani Vainikka	(Czech Republic) Škoda Motorsport	Škoda Fabia WRC	3:11:52.3	+4:36.2	3
7	15	(Belgium) François Duval	(Belgium) Stéphane Prévot	(United Kingdom) Ford Motor Co. Ltd.	Ford Focus RS WRC '04	3:13:07.1	+5:51.0	2
8	12	(Finland) Toni Gardemeister	(Finland) Paavo Lukander	(Czech Republic) Škoda Motorsport	Škoda Fabia WRC	3:13:19.3	+6:03.2	1

=== World Rally Cars ===
==== Classification ====
Position		No.	Driver	Co-driver	Entrant	Car	Time	Difference	Points
Event	Class	No.	Driver	Co-driver	Entrant	Car	Time	Difference	Points
1	1	5	(Finland) Marcus Grönholm	(Finland) Timo Rautiainen	(France) Marlboro Peugeot Total	Peugeot 307 WRC	3:07:16.1		10
2	2	7	(Estonia) Markko Märtin	(United Kingdom) Michael Park	(United Kingdom) Ford Motor Co. Ltd.	Ford Focus RS WRC '04	3:07:50.8	+34.7	8
3	3	4	(Spain) Carlos Sainz	(Spain) Marc Martí	(France) Citroën Total WRT	Citroën Xsara WRC	3:09:00.6	+1:44.5	6
4	4	3	(France) Sébastien Loeb	(Monaco) Daniel Elena	(France) Citroën Total WRT	Citroën Xsara WRC	3:09:39.4	+2:23.3	5
5	5	8	(Finland) Janne Tuohino	(Finland) Jukka Aho	(United Kingdom) Ford Motor Co. Ltd.	Ford Focus RS WRC '04	3:09:52.8	+2:36.7	4
11	6	9	(France) Gilles Panizzi	(France) Hervé Panizzi	(Japan) Mitsubishi Motors	Mitsubishi Lancer WRC 04	3:14:49.1	+7:33.0	0
Retired SS14		10	(Finland) Kristian Sohlberg	(Finland) Kaj Lindström	(Japan) Mitsubishi Motors	Mitsubishi Lancer WRC 04	Accident		0
Retired SS10		2	(Finland) Mikko Hirvonen	(Finland) Jarmo Lehtinen	(Japan) 555 Subaru World Rally Team	Subaru Impreza S10 WRC '04	Accident		0
Retired SS7		6	(Finland) Harri Rovanperä	(Finland) Risto Pietiläinen	(France) Marlboro Peugeot Total	Peugeot 307 WRC	Accident		0
Retired SS4		1	(Norway) Petter Solberg	(United Kingdom) Phil Mills	(Japan) 555 Subaru World Rally Team	Subaru Impreza S10 WRC '04	Accident		0

==== Special stages ====
Day	Stage	Stage name	Length	Winner	Car	Time	Class leaders
Leg 1 (6 Aug)	SS1	Kuohu 1	7.76 km	(Finland) Harri Rovanperä	Peugeot 307 WRC	3:41.6	(Finland) Harri Rovanperä
Leg 1 (6 Aug)	SS2	Parkkola 1	14.95 km	(Finland) Harri Rovanperä	Peugeot 307 WRC	7:26.8	(Finland) Harri Rovanperä
Leg 1 (6 Aug)	SS3	Mökkiperä 1	13.96 km	(Finland) Harri Rovanperä	Peugeot 307 WRC	6:51.2	(Finland) Harri Rovanperä
Leg 1 (6 Aug)	SS4	Lankamaa	24.86 km	(Finland) Marcus Grönholm	Peugeot 307 WRC	12:04.1	(Finland) Harri Rovanperä
Leg 1 (6 Aug)	SS5	Laukaa	11.82 km	(Finland) Harri Rovanperä	Peugeot 307 WRC	5:44.3	(Finland) Harri Rovanperä
Leg 1 (6 Aug)	SS6	Ruuhimäki	7.57 km	(Finland) Marcus Grönholm	Peugeot 307 WRC	3:57.1	(Finland) Marcus Grönholm
Leg 1 (6 Aug)	SS7	Kuohu 2	7.76 km	(Finland) Marcus Grönholm	Peugeot 307 WRC	3:39.4	(Finland) Marcus Grönholm
Leg 1 (6 Aug)	SS8	Parkkola 2	14.95 km	(Finland) Marcus Grönholm	Peugeot 307 WRC	7:20.8	(Finland) Marcus Grönholm
Leg 1 (6 Aug)	SS9	Mökkiperä 2	13.96 km	(Finland) Marcus Grönholm	Peugeot 307 WRC	6:47.6	(Finland) Marcus Grönholm
Leg 1 (6 Aug)	SS10	Killeri 1	2.06 km	(Estonia) Markko Märtin	Ford Focus RS WRC '04	1:18.7	(Finland) Marcus Grönholm
Leg 2 (7 Aug)	SS11	Vaheri	24.15 km	(Finland) Marcus Grönholm	Peugeot 307 WRC	12:04.5	(Finland) Marcus Grönholm
Leg 2 (7 Aug)	SS12	Ouninpohja 1	33.24 km	(Norway) Petter Solberg	Subaru Impreza S10 WRC '04	15:29.8	(Finland) Marcus Grönholm
Leg 2 (7 Aug)	SS13	Urria	10.00 km	(Norway) Petter Solberg	Subaru Impreza S10 WRC '04	4:42.3	(Finland) Marcus Grönholm
Leg 2 (7 Aug)	SS14	Ouninpohja 2	33.24 km	(Norway) Petter Solberg	Subaru Impreza S10 WRC '04	15:18.5	(Finland) Marcus Grönholm
Leg 2 (7 Aug)	SS15	Ehikki	11.34 km	(Norway) Petter Solberg	Subaru Impreza S10 WRC '04	5:21.7	(Finland) Marcus Grönholm
Leg 2 (7 Aug)	SS16	Moksi — Leustu	40.96 km	(Finland) Marcus Grönholm	Peugeot 307 WRC	20:30.2	(Finland) Marcus Grönholm
Leg 2 (7 Aug)	SS17	Himos	12.81 km	(Norway) Petter Solberg	Subaru Impreza S10 WRC '04	7:06.4	(Finland) Marcus Grönholm
Leg 2 (7 Aug)	SS18	Killeri 2	2.06 km	(Estonia) Markko Märtin	Ford Focus RS WRC '04	1:19.1	(Finland) Marcus Grönholm
Leg 3 (8 Aug)	SS19	Jukojärvi 1	22.31 km	(Finland) Mikko Hirvonen	Subaru Impreza S10 WRC '04	10:46.0	(Finland) Marcus Grönholm
Leg 3 (8 Aug)	SS20	Kruununperä 1	25.32 km	(Norway) Petter Solberg	Subaru Impreza S10 WRC '04	11:53.6	(Finland) Marcus Grönholm
Leg 3 (8 Aug)	SS21	Jukojärvi 2	22.31 km	(Norway) Petter Solberg	Subaru Impreza S10 WRC '04	10:36.1	(Finland) Marcus Grönholm
Leg 3 (8 Aug)	SS22	Kruununperä 2	25.32 km	(Norway) Petter Solberg	Subaru Impreza S10 WRC '04	11:54.3	(Finland) Marcus Grönholm

==== Championship standings ====
Pos.	Drivers' championships			Co-drivers' championships			Manufacturers' championships		
Pos.	Move	Driver	Points	Move	Co-driver	Points	Move	Manufacturer	Points
1		(France) Sébastien Loeb	66		(Monaco) Daniel Elena	66		(France) Citroën Total WRT	109
2		(Norway) Petter Solberg	44		(United Kingdom) Phil Mills	44		(United Kingdom) Ford Motor Co. Ltd.	83
3		(Estonia) Markko Märtin	42		(United Kingdom) Michael Park	42		(Japan) 555 Subaru World Rally Team	64
4	1	(Finland) Marcus Grönholm	42	1	(Finland) Timo Rautiainen	42		(France) Marlboro Peugeot Total	61
5	1	(Spain) Carlos Sainz	40	1	(Spain) Marc Martí	40		(Japan) Mitsubishi Motors	17

=== Junior World Rally Championship ===
==== Classification ====
Position		No.	Driver	Co-driver	Entrant	Car	Time	Difference	Points
Event	Class	No.	Driver	Co-driver	Entrant	Car	Time	Difference	Points
16	1	45	(Sweden) Per-Gunnar Andersson	(Sweden) Jonas Andersson	(Japan) Suzuki Sport	Suzuki Ignis S1600	3:29:11.6		10
17	2	35	(Finland) Kosti Katajamäki	(Finland) Timo Alanne	(Japan) Suzuki Sport	Suzuki Ignis S1600	3:29:24.9	+13.3	8
19	3	39	(France) Nicolas Bernardi	(Belgium) Jean-Marc Fortin	(France) Renault Sport	Renault Clio S1600	3:32:17.3	+3:05.7	6
20	4	31	(San Marino) Mirco Baldacci	(Italy) Giovanni Bernacchini	(Japan) Suzuki Sport	Suzuki Ignis S1600	3:32:28.6	+3:17.0	5
23	5	32	(Estonia) Urmo Aava	(Estonia) Kuldar Sikk	(Japan) Suzuki Sport	Suzuki Ignis S1600	3:34:00.8	+4:49.2	4
24	6	51	(Belgium) Larry Cols	(Belgium) Filip Goddé	(France) Renault Sport	Renault Clio S1600	3:34:48.6	+5:37.0	3
28	7	46	(Spain) Xavier Pons	(Spain) Oriol Julià Pascual	(Spain) RACC Motor Sport	Fiat Punto S1600	3:42:19.7	+13:08.1	2
31	8	37	(Italy) Luca Cecchettini	(Italy) Nicola Arena	(Italy) Autorel Sport	Renault Clio S1600	3:43:31.8	+14:20.2	1
32	9	42	(France) Mathieu Biasion	(France) Eric Domenech	(Italy) Power Car Team	Renault Clio S1600	3:46:03.3	+16:51.7	0
34	10	41	(United Kingdom) Natalie Barratt	(United Kingdom) Carl Williamson	(United Kingdom) Risbridger Motorsport	Renault Clio S1600	3:53:25.1	+24:13.5	0
Retired SS19		49	(Italy) Luca Betti	(Italy) Paolo Del Grande	(Italy) Meteco Corse	Peugeot 206 S1600	Engine		0
Retired SS15		44	(Italy) Alan Scorcioni	(Italy) Massimo Daddoveri	(Italy) H.F. Grifone SRL	Fiat Punto S1600	Accident		0
Retired SS12		50	(United Kingdom) Oliver Marshall	(United Kingdom) Craig Parry	(United Kingdom) Prospeed Motorsport	Renault Clio S1600	Accident		0
Retired SS11		47	(Italy) Luca Tabaton	(Italy) Gisella Rovegno	(Italy) H.F. Grifone SRL	Fiat Punto S1600	Accident		0
Retired SS10		48	(Zimbabwe) Conrad Rautenbach	(United Kingdom) Mark Jones	(United Kingdom) Birkbeck Rallysport	Opel Corsa S1600	Accident		0
Retired SS9		34	(San Marino) Alessandro Broccoli	(Italy) Giovanni Agnese	(San Marino) Sab Motorsport	Fiat Punto S1600	Engine		0
Retired SS9		36	(United Kingdom) Kris Meeke	(United Kingdom) Chris Patterson	(United Kingdom) McRae Motorsport	Opel Corsa S1600	Accident		0
Retired SS8		40	(France) Guerlain Chicherit	(France) Mathieu Baumel	(France) Citroën Total	Citroën Saxo S1600	Accident		0
Retired SS7		33	(United Kingdom) Guy Wilks	(United Kingdom) Phil Pugh	(Japan) Suzuki Sport	Suzuki Ignis S1600	Accident		0
Retired SS3		43	(Finland) Jari-Matti Latvala	(Finland) Miikka Anttila	(Japan) Suzuki Sport	Suzuki Ignis S1600	Accident		0

==== Special stages ====
Day	Stage	Stage name	Length	Winner	Car	Time	Class leaders
Leg 1 (6 Aug)	SS1	Kuohu 1	7.76 km	(United Kingdom) Kris Meeke	Opel Corsa S1600	4:09.3	(United Kingdom) Kris Meeke
Leg 1 (6 Aug)	SS2	Parkkola 1	14.95 km	(United Kingdom) Kris Meeke	Opel Corsa S1600	8:15.0	(United Kingdom) Kris Meeke
Leg 1 (6 Aug)	SS3	Mökkiperä 1	13.96 km	(United Kingdom) Guy Wilks	Suzuki Ignis S1600	7:43.2	(United Kingdom) Kris Meeke
Leg 1 (6 Aug)	SS4	Lankamaa	24.86 km	(Sweden) Per-Gunnar Andersson	Suzuki Ignis S1600	13:36.2	(Sweden) Per-Gunnar Andersson
Leg 1 (6 Aug)	SS5	Laukaa	11.82 km	(Sweden) Per-Gunnar Andersson	Suzuki Ignis S1600	6:23.5	(Sweden) Per-Gunnar Andersson
Leg 1 (6 Aug)	SS6	Ruuhimäki	7.57 km	(Sweden) Per-Gunnar Andersson	Suzuki Ignis S1600	4:28.6	(Sweden) Per-Gunnar Andersson
Leg 1 (6 Aug)	SS7	Kuohu 2	7.76 km	(Finland) Kosti Katajamäki	Suzuki Ignis S1600	4:08.3	(Sweden) Per-Gunnar Andersson
Leg 1 (6 Aug)	SS8	Parkkola 2	14.95 km	(Sweden) Per-Gunnar Andersson	Suzuki Ignis S1600	8:11.1	(Sweden) Per-Gunnar Andersson
Leg 1 (6 Aug)	SS9	Mökkiperä 2	13.96 km	(Finland) Kosti Katajamäki	Suzuki Ignis S1600	7:39.8	(Sweden) Per-Gunnar Andersson
Leg 1 (6 Aug)	SS10	Killeri 1	2.06 km	(San Marino) Mirco Baldacci	Suzuki Ignis S1600	1:27.0	(Sweden) Per-Gunnar Andersson
Leg 2 (7 Aug)	SS11	Vaheri	24.15 km	(Finland) Kosti Katajamäki	Suzuki Ignis S1600	13:20.0	(Sweden) Per-Gunnar Andersson
Leg 2 (7 Aug)	SS12	Ouninpohja 1	33.24 km	(Sweden) Per-Gunnar Andersson	Suzuki Ignis S1600	17:12.5	(Sweden) Per-Gunnar Andersson
Leg 2 (7 Aug)	SS13	Urria	10.00 km	(Finland) Kosti Katajamäki	Suzuki Ignis S1600	5:18.2	(Sweden) Per-Gunnar Andersson
Leg 2 (7 Aug)	SS14	Ouninpohja 2	33.24 km	(Sweden) Per-Gunnar Andersson	Suzuki Ignis S1600	17:01.6	(Sweden) Per-Gunnar Andersson
Leg 2 (7 Aug)	SS15	Ehikki	11.34 km	(Finland) Kosti Katajamäki	Suzuki Ignis S1600	5:57.7	(Finland) Kosti Katajamäki
Leg 2 (7 Aug)	SS16	Moksi — Leustu	40.96 km	(Sweden) Per-Gunnar Andersson	Suzuki Ignis S1600	23:02.5	(Sweden) Per-Gunnar Andersson
Leg 2 (7 Aug)	SS17	Himos	12.81 km	(Sweden) Per-Gunnar Andersson	Suzuki Ignis S1600	8:00.3	(Sweden) Per-Gunnar Andersson
Leg 2 (7 Aug)	SS18	Killeri 2	2.06 km	(Belgium) Larry Cols	Renault Clio S1600	1:27.4	(Sweden) Per-Gunnar Andersson
Leg 3 (8 Aug)	SS19	Jukojärvi 1	22.31 km	(Finland) Kosti Katajamäki	Suzuki Ignis S1600	12:07.8	(Finland) Kosti Katajamäki
Leg 3 (8 Aug)	SS20	Kruununperä 1	25.32 km	(Sweden) Per-Gunnar Andersson	Suzuki Ignis S1600	13:30.2	(Sweden) Per-Gunnar Andersson
Leg 3 (8 Aug)	SS21	Jukojärvi 2	22.31 km	(France) Nicolas Bernardi	Renault Clio S1600	11:57.8	(Sweden) Per-Gunnar Andersson
Leg 3 (8 Aug)	SS22	Kruununperä 2	25.32 km	(Sweden) Per-Gunnar Andersson	Suzuki Ignis S1600	13:22.1	(Sweden) Per-Gunnar Andersson

==== Championship standings ====
Pos.	Drivers' championships		
Pos.	Move	Driver	Points
1		(France) Nicolas Bernardi	24
2	2	(Sweden) Per-Gunnar Andersson	21
3	1	(United Kingdom) Guy Wilks	16
4	2	(Finland) Kosti Katajamäki	16
5	2	(Estonia) Urmo Aava	16
