= Andreas Mikkelsen =

Norwegian rally driver (born 1989)

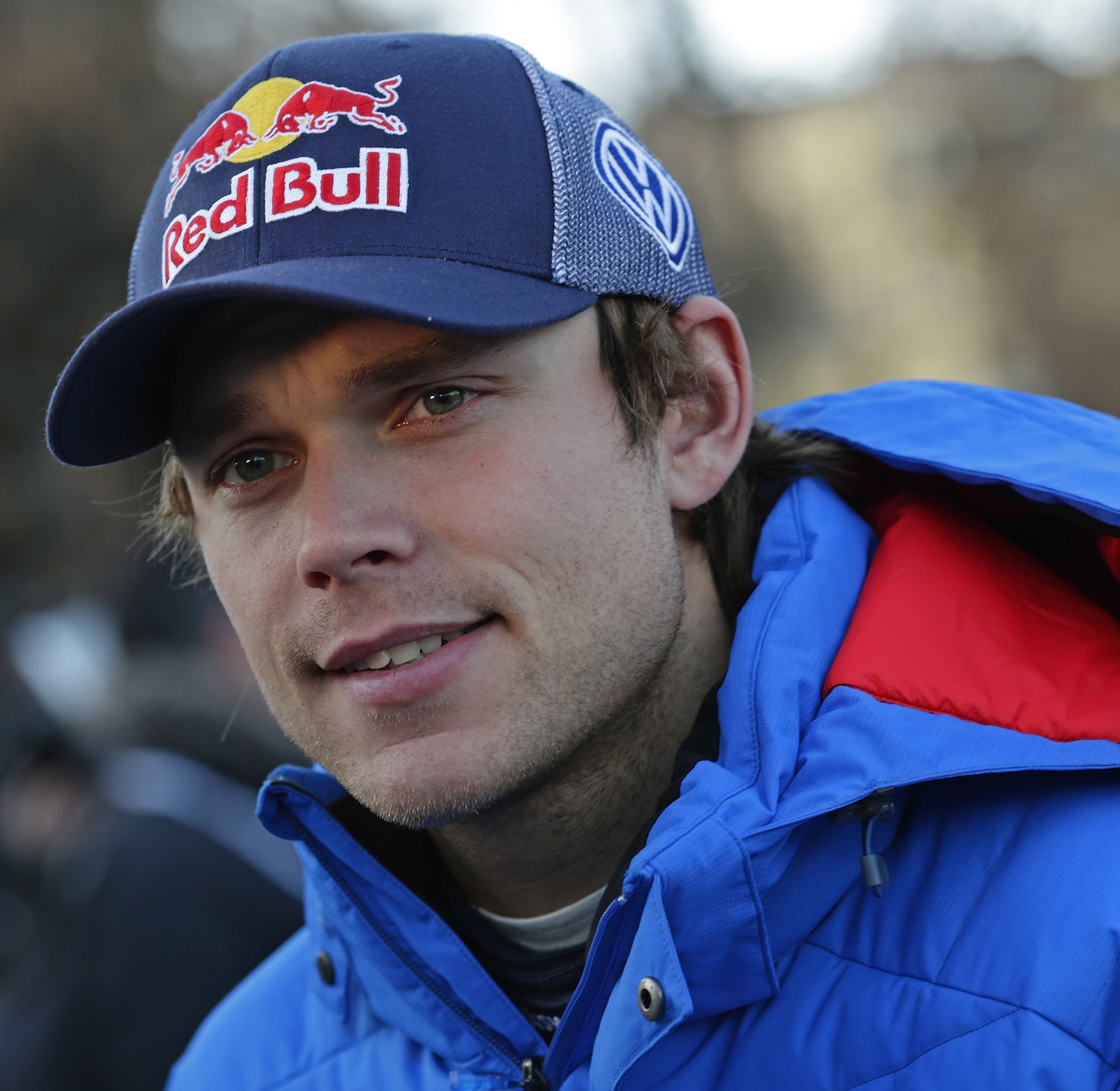
- Mikkelsen at the 2015 Rallye Automobile Monte Carlo

Personal information
- Nationality: (Norway) Norwegian
- Born: 22 June 1989 (age 37); Oslo, Norway

World Rally Championship record
- Years active: 2006–present
- Co-driver: Current (Norway) Jørn Listerud; Former (Norway) Torstein Eriksen (United Kingdom) Phil Hall (United Kingdom) Elliott Edmondson (Norway) Ola Fløene (Norway) Anders Jæger (Finland) Mikko Markkula (Republic of Ireland) Paul Nagle (Sweden) Jonas Andersson
- Teams: Stobart Ford, Volkswagen, Škoda, Citroën, Hyundai, Toksport WRT
- Rallies: 138
- Championships: 0
- Rally wins: 3
- Podiums: 25
- Stage wins: 117
- Total points: 900
- First rally: 2006 Wales Rally GB
- First win: 2015 Rally Catalunya
- Last win: 2016 Rally Australia
- Last rally: 2026 Acropolis Rally

Andreas Mikkelsen (born 22 June 1989) is a Norwegian rally driver. He is currently competing in the WRC2 Championship for Toksport WRT. He previously drove in the top category for the factory teams of Volkswagen, Citroën and Hyundai, finishing third in the drivers' standings in 2014, 2015 and 2016. His current co-driver is Jørn Listerud.

Mikkelsen is a two-time Intercontinental Rally Challenge champion, having finished first in 2011 and 2012. In 2021, he became the drivers' champion in both the WRC2 and the European Rally Championship. He won WRC2 for a second time in 2023.

== Career ==
Mikkelsen has a broad background in sports. He has competed in slalom and giant slalom, and was a member of the national juniors' alpine skiing team. In 2003 and 2004, he competed in motocross, also representing the national juniors' team.

=== 2006–2010: Ford ===
After turning 17 and getting a British driver's license, Mikkelsen started competing in rallies in the United Kingdom and Ireland. Driving a Ford Focus RS WRC, he won the Quinton Stages, the Coracle, the Plains, the Bulldog and the Cambrian Rally, as well as the Saaremaa Rally in Estonia. He finished 38th overall in 2007 in the famous Donegal International Rally in his Ford Focus, finishing almost an hour behind eventual winner Sébastien Loeb.

Mikkelsen debuted in the World Rally Championship at the 2006 Rally GB and retired from the 14th special stage after going off the road. In the 2007 season, he competed in eight WRC events, and also took part in the Irish Tarmac Championship and the Norwegian Rally Championship. His best WRC results were ninth at the 2007 Rally Ireland and tenth in Norway and Portugal.

For the 2008 season, Mikkelsen had some exclusive coaching from Ford's retired double world champion Marcus Grönholm. Even though having major problems with turbocharger on Friday's stages, he achieved the best result of his WRC career so far by claiming fifth in the 2008 Swedish Rally, beating Matthew Wilson's 2006 record of being the youngest driver ever to score points in a WRC event. He intended to compete in all of the championship rounds in Europe, whilst completing his final year in school.

During Rally Larvik in September 2009, Mikkelsen was involved in an accident, when he got a slide on his car and hit a ten-year-old spectator, killing her instantly.

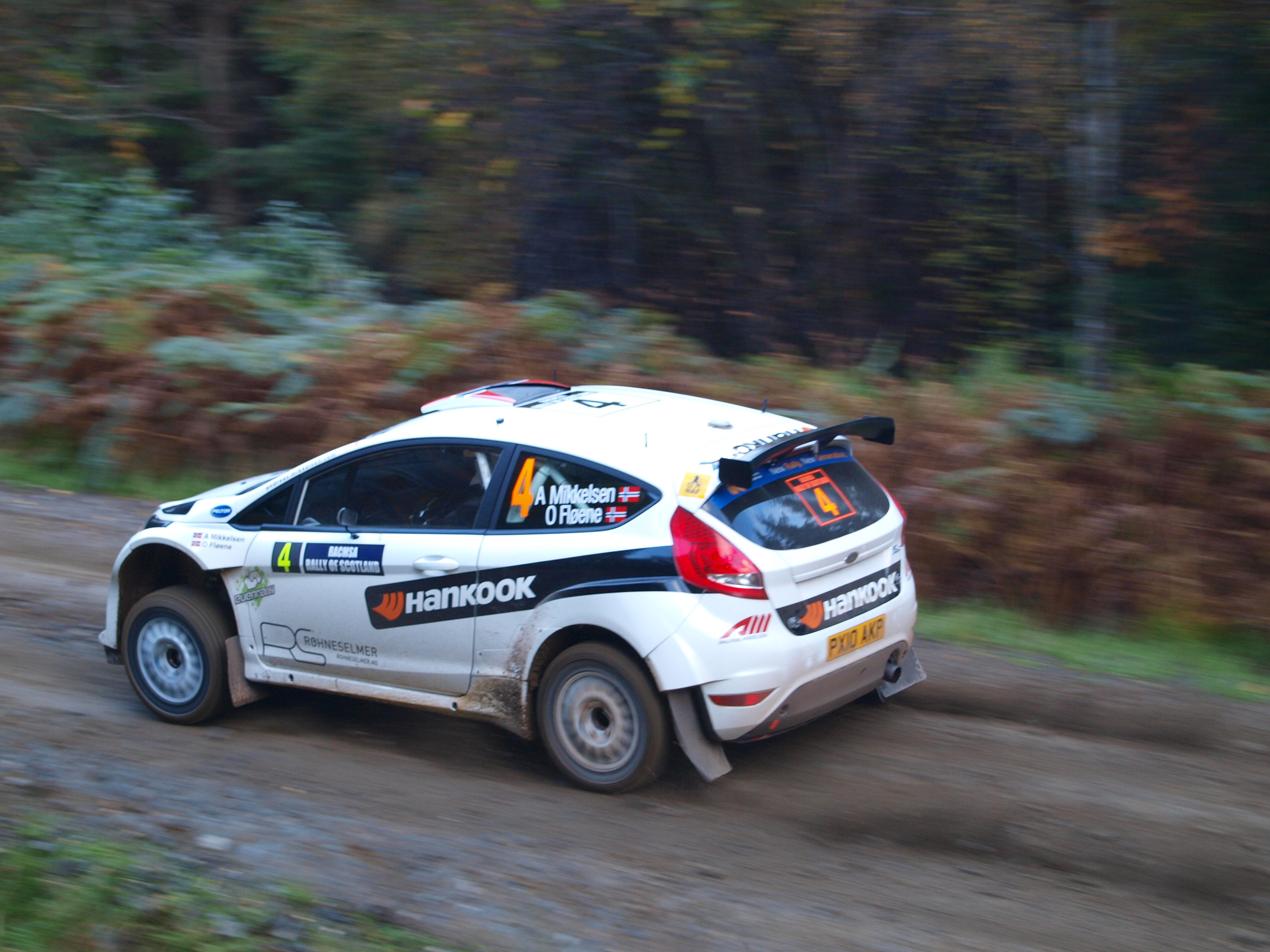
Mikkelsen, in the Ford Fiesta S2000, on his way to second place on the 2010 Rally Scotland.

In 2010, Mikkelsen competed in the Intercontinental Rally Challenge driving a Ford Fiesta S2000 with a best finish of second on the 2010 Rally Scotland. He placed seventh in the overall standings. Mikkelsen drove a Super 2000 car also on three WRC rounds, and won the SWRC class at the season-ending 2010 Wales Rally GB.

=== 2011–2012: Škoda ===
Following a strong 2010 campaign, Mikkelsen signed with the Skoda UK Motorsport team for the 2011 IRC season.

During his 2011 season driving for Skoda UK Motorsport in the IRC, Mikkelsen was off to a rough start. The first rally of the season, Rally Monte-Carlo, Mikkelsen had to retire only after SS1. Sata Rallye Açores where a turning point of the season, where he placed second, his first ever podium in the IRC. Prior to the last rally of the season, Rally Cyprus, five drivers were fighting for the drivers championship. Mikkelsen, winning Rally Cyprus took home the title, being the youngest person ever to win the IRC.

Mikkelsen continued his dominance of the IRC in the 2012 season, claiming the drivers championship after winning at Azores and Romania plus collecting five second place finishes. Mikkelsen is the first ever to win the IRC (now ERC) two consecutive times.

=== 2013–2016: Volkswagen ===
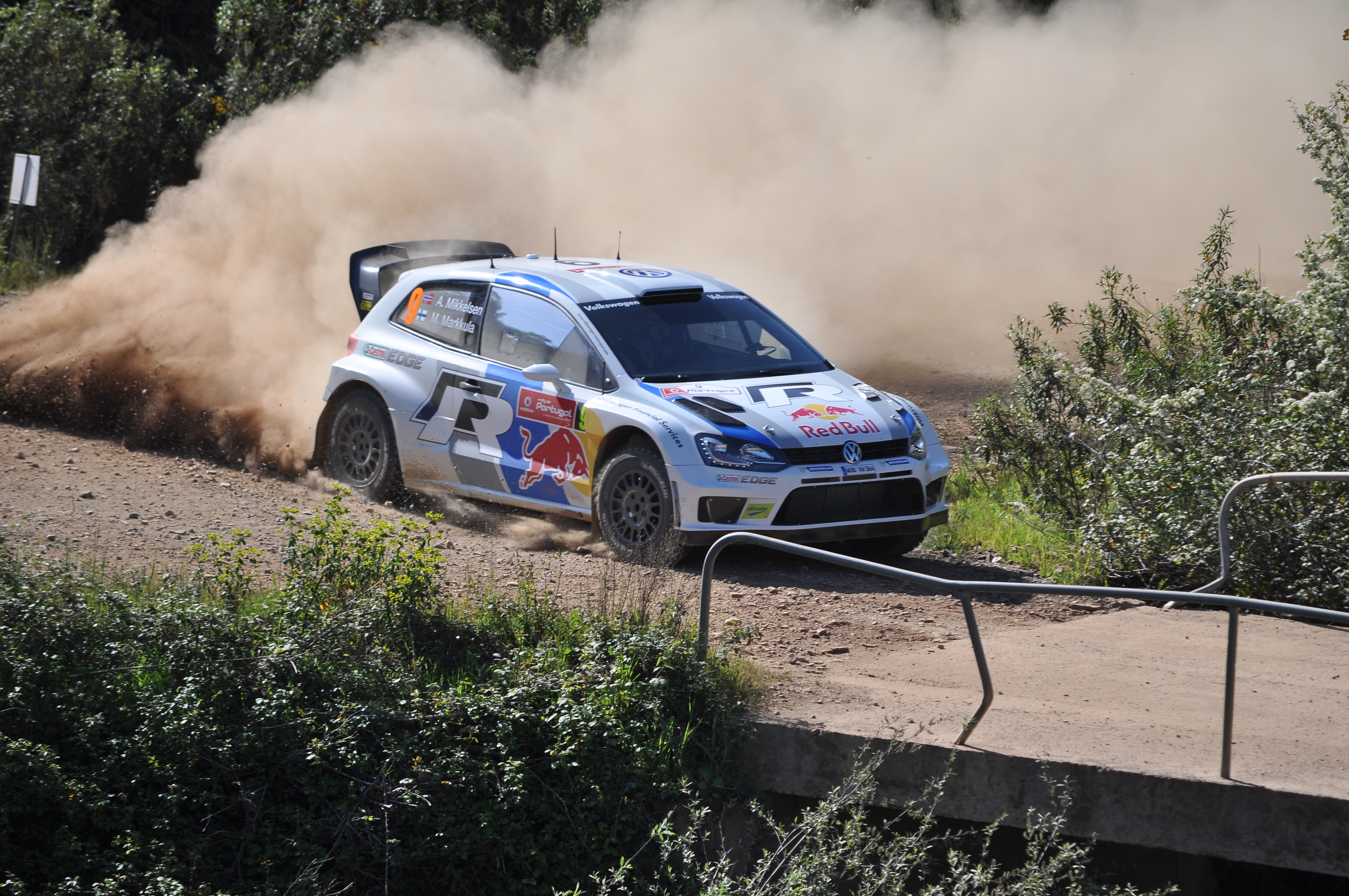
Mikkelsen driving a Volkswagen Polo R WRC at the 2013 Rally de Portugal.

From 2013 to 2016, Mikkelsen competed for Volkswagen Motorsport II in their factory Polo WRC. He did not reach the podium during the 2013 season, but won several special stages, placing tenth in the overall standings. 2014 saw more favourable results, with three second placed finishes, and two third place results, he completed the year in an impressive third place in the championship overall standings. In 2015, he achieved his first rally victory in Spain, and seven third place results, giving him another third place in the world championship. Mikkelsen followed that by two more wins in Poland and Australia during the 2016 season, and two more second places, resulting in yet another third place in the championship overall. Mikkelsen had finished third in the championship three times consecutively from 2014 to 2016. Volkswagen retired from WRC at the end of 2016, leaving Mikkelsen without a drive for 2017.

=== 2017: Škoda, Citroën and Hyundai ===
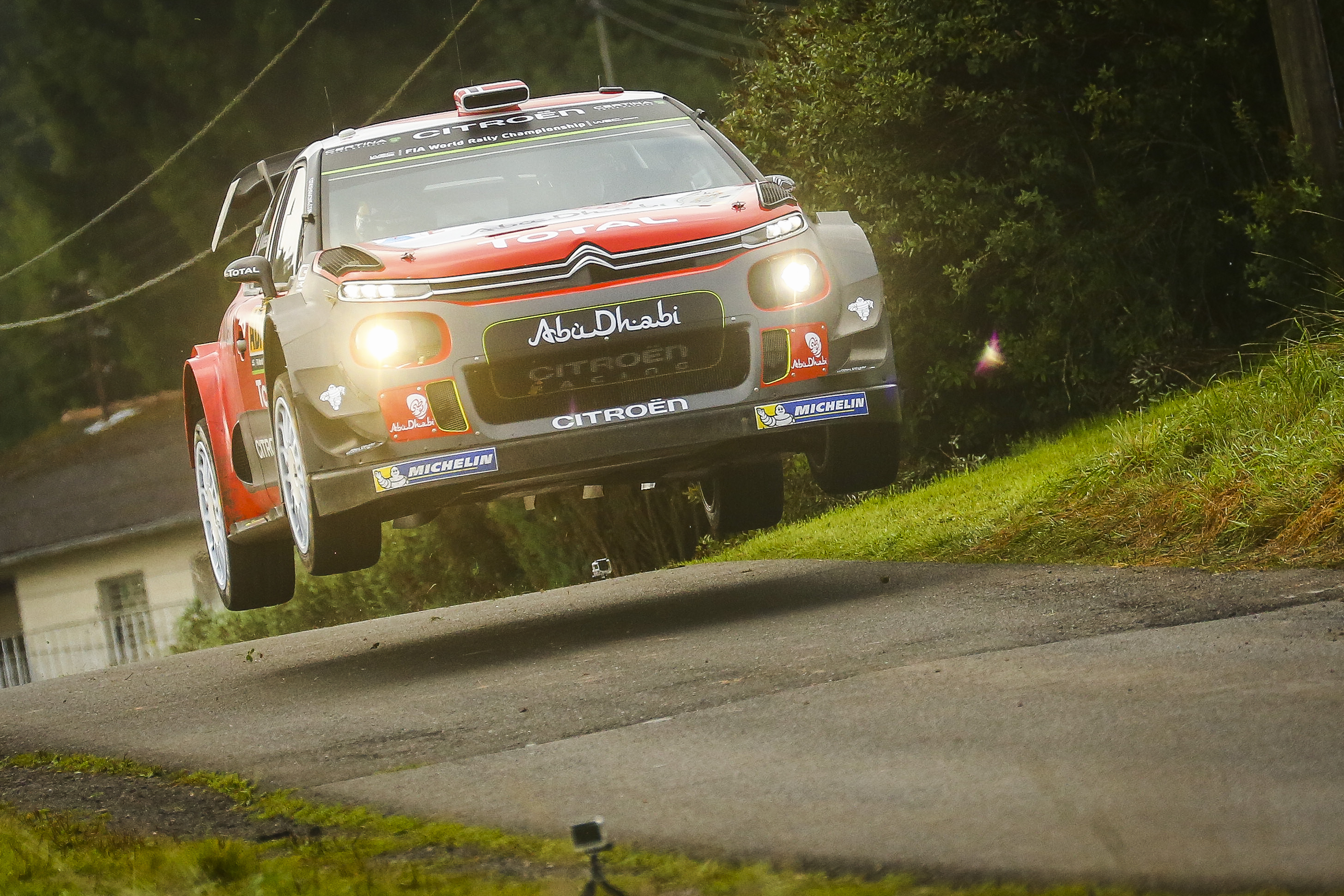
Citroën C3 WRC of Andreas Mikkelsen at 2017 Rallye Deutschland

In early 2017, Mikkelsen entered three rounds of the WRC2 with a factory Škoda Fabia R5, winning the Monte Carlo Rally and Tour de Corse. He joined the Citroën World Rally Team in mid 2017, debuting at Italy with a Citroën C3 WRC. After finishing second in Germany, Mikkelsen signed a deal for 2018 with Hyundai Motorsport, joining close friend Thierry Neuville, Dani Sordo and Hayden Paddon. He finished fourth in Welsh Rally GB before the end of that year.

=== 2018–2019: Hyundai ===
2018 started promisingly with third place in Sweden, but Andreas suffered a series of setbacks, and finished the year sixth place overall. 2019 was significantly better. Despite missing out or retiring from six of the fourteen WRC events that year, Mikkelsen scored one second place and two third places, to finish the season in fourth place overall. His contract with Hyundai was not renewed at the end of 2019, leaving Mikkelsen without a WRC drive.

=== 2020: Pirelli tests and Eurosol Racing Team ===
Mikkelsen was left without a drive for 2020 season, so at Rally Sardegna he co-drove for 2003 World Drivers' Champion Petter Solberg. They contested the rally in Shakedown and Power Stage using Saintéloc-prepared Citroen C3 WRC equipped with Pirelli tyres to be used for the 2021 season. At Rally Monza, together with Eurosol Racing Team he finished 6th in WRC2 and won in WRC3 category.

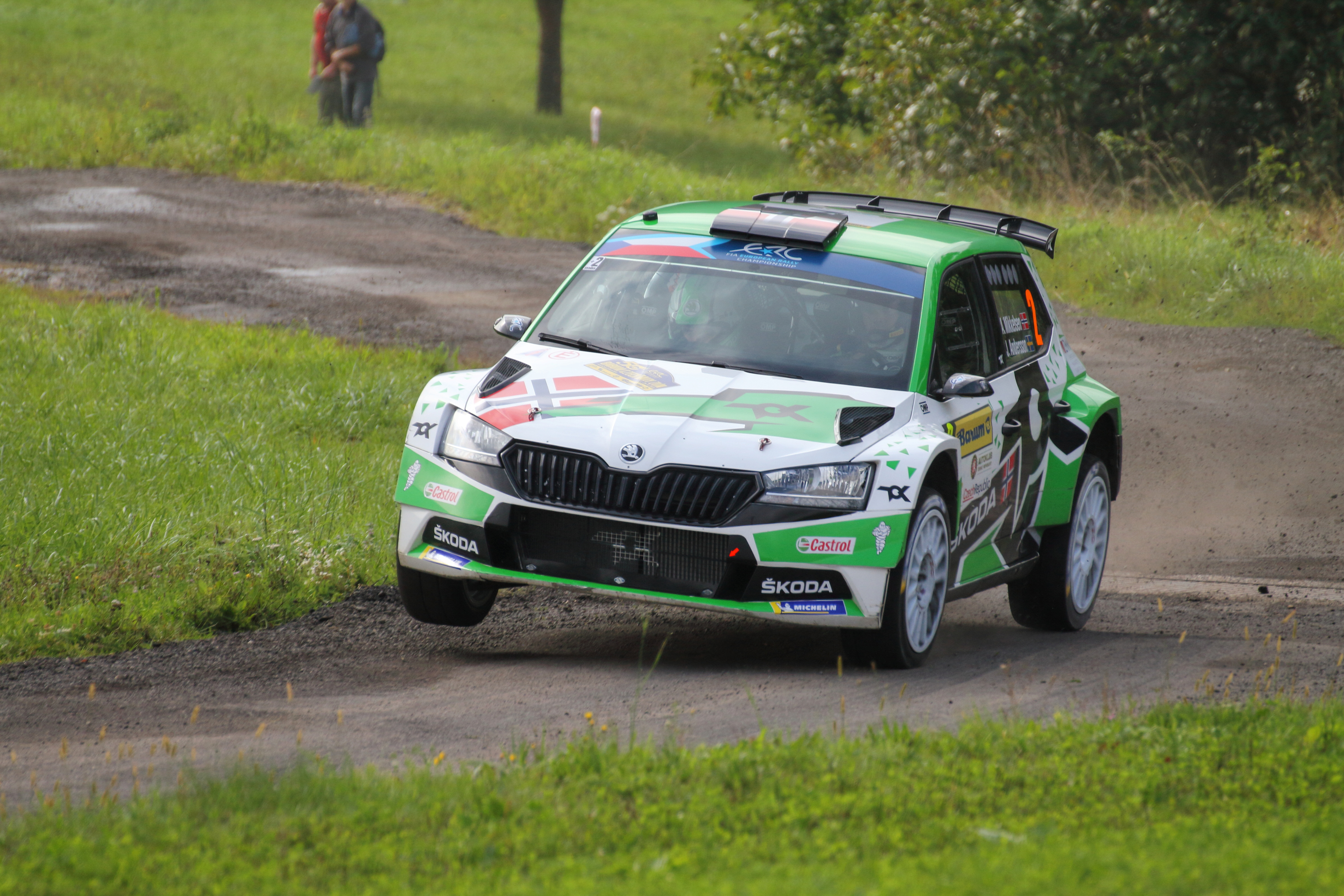
Mikkelsen driving a Škoda Fabia Rally2 evo at the 2021 Barum Czech Rally Zlín.

=== 2021–2023: Toksport and Škoda ===
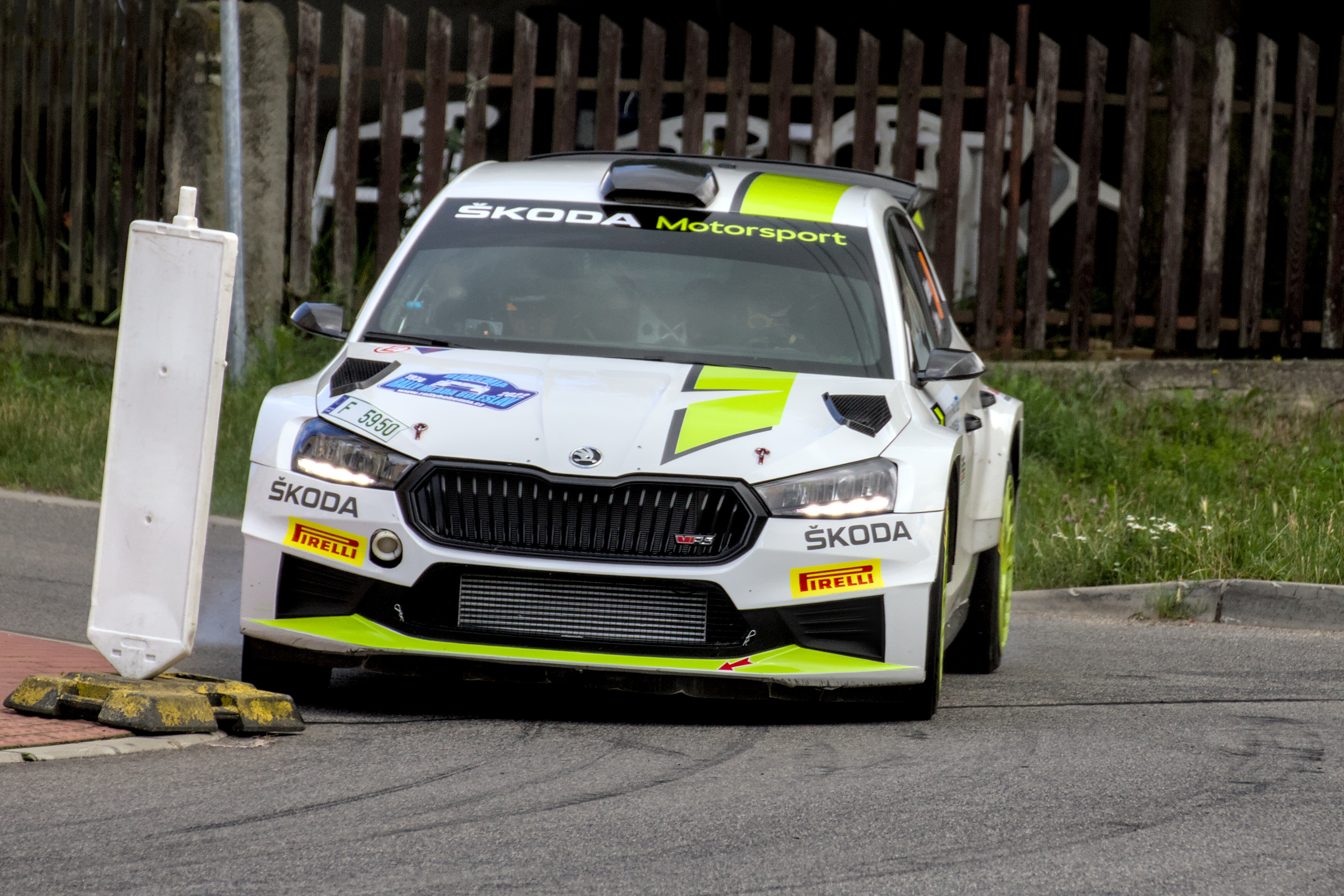
Mikkelsen at the 2022 Bohemia Rally Mladá Boleslav, driving the new Škoda Fabia RS Rally2

For 2021, Mikkelsen joined Toksport WRT for a combined WRC2 and ERC campaign, driving a Škoda Fabia R5/Rally2 evo. He became the first driver to win both the WRC2 and ERC title in the same year. He stayed with the team until 2023. Between the races, he also helped Škoda Motorsport to develop the new Škoda Fabia RS Rally2 and he drove it at the 2022 Bohemia Rally Mladá Boleslav as course car.

=== 2024: Hyundai ===
In 2024, Mikkelsen returned to Hyundai for his second stint in the top category with the team, driving part-time in a car shared with Dani Sordo and Esapekka Lappi.

=== 2026: Toksport and Škoda ===
After doing minimal rallying in 2025, Mikkelsen returned to Toksport for his fourth stint with Škoda in 2026.

== Skiing career ==
Mikkelsen was an Alpine skier before concentrating on rallying.

== WRC victories ==
#	Event	Season	Co-driver	Car
1	(Spain) 51º Rally RACC Catalunya – Costa Daurada	2015	(Norway) Ola Fløene	Volkswagen Polo R WRC
2	73rd Rally Poland	2016	(Norway) Anders Jæger	Volkswagen Polo R WRC
3	25th Rally Australia	2016	(Norway) Anders Jæger	Volkswagen Polo R WRC

== Racing record ==
=== Complete WRC results ===
Year	Entrant	Car	1	2	3	4	5	6	7	8	9	10	11	12	13	14	15	16	Pos.	Points
2006	Stobart VK Ford Rally Team	Ford Focus RS WRC 04	MON	SWE	MEX	ESP	FRA	ARG	ITA	GRE	GER	FIN	JPN	CYP	TUR	AUS	NZL	GBR; Ret	NC	0
2007	Stobart VK Ford Rally Team	Ford Focus RS WRC 04	MON	SWE	NOR; 10	MEX	POR; 10												NC	0
2007	Ramsport	Ford Focus RS WRC 04						ARG	ITA	GRE	FIN; 12	GER; 24	NZW	ESP; 25	FRA; DSQ	JPN	IRE; 9		NC	0
2007	Ramsport	Ford Focus RS WRC 06																GBR; Ret	NC	0
2008	Ramsport	Ford Focus RS WRC 06	MON	SWE; 5	MEX	ARG	JOR	ITA; Ret	GRE	TUR; 19	FIN; 12								16th	5
2008	Ramsport	Ford Focus RS WRC 07										GER; 11	NZL	ESP; 8	FRA; 11	JPN	GBR		16th	5
2009	Andreas Mikkelsen	Subaru Impreza WRX STi	IRE	NOR; Ret															NC	0
2009	Andreas Mikkelsen	Škoda Fabia WRC			CYP	POR	ARG	ITA	GRE	POL; Ret	FIN	AUS	ESP	GBR					NC	0
2010	Andreas Mikkelsen	Ford Fiesta S2000	SWE; 11	MEX	JOR	TUR	NZL	POR	BUL	FIN	GER	JPN							26th	1
2010	Andreas Mikkelsen	Škoda Fabia S2000											FRA; 18	ESP					26th	1
2010	Czech Ford National Team	Škoda Fabia S2000													GBR; 10				26th	1
2011	Volkswagen Motorsport	Škoda Fabia S2000	SWE	MEX	POR	JOR	ITA	ARG	GRE	FIN; Ret	GER	AUS	FRA	ESP	GBR				NC	0
2012	Volkswagen Motorsport	Škoda Fabia S2000	MON	SWE; 13	MEX	POR	ARG; Ret	GRE; Ret	NZL	FIN; 27	GER; 7	GBR	FRA; 12	ITA; 7	ESP; 21				14th	13
2013	Volkswagen Motorsport II	Volkswagen Polo R WRC	MON	SWE	MEX	POR; 6	ARG; 8	GRE; 4	ITA; Ret	FIN; 10	GER; WD	AUS; 7	FRA; 7	ESP; Ret	GBR; 5				10th	50
2014	Volkswagen Motorsport II	Volkswagen Polo R WRC	MON; 7	SWE; 2	MEX; 19	POR; 4	ARG; 4	ITA; 4	POL; 2	FIN; 4	GER; 3	AUS; 3	FRA; 2	ESP; 7	GBR; Ret				3rd	150
2015	Volkswagen Motorsport II	Volkswagen Polo R WRC	MON; 3	SWE; 3	MEX; 3	ARG; Ret	POR; 3	ITA; 36	POL; 2	FIN; Ret	GER; 3	AUS; 4	FRA; 3	ESP; 1	GBR; 3				3rd	171
2016	Volkswagen Motorsport II	Volkswagen Polo R WRC	MON; 2	SWE; 4	MEX; Ret	ARG; 3	POR; 2	ITA; 13	POL; 1	FIN; 7	GER; 4	CHN; C	FRA; 3	ESP; Ret	GBR; 12	AUS; 1			3rd	154
2017	Škoda Motorsport	Škoda Fabia R5	MON; 7	SWE	MEX	FRA; 7	ARG	POR; Ret											12th	54
2017	Citroën Total Abu Dhabi WRT	Citroën C3 WRC							ITA; 8	POL; 9	FIN	GER; 2							12th	54
2017	Hyundai Motorsport	Hyundai i20 Coupe WRC											ESP; 18	GBR; 4	AUS; 11				12th	54
2018	Hyundai Shell Mobis WRT	Hyundai i20 Coupe WRC	MON; 13	SWE; 3	MEX; 4	FRA; 7	ARG; 5	POR; 16	ITA; 18	FIN; 10	GER; 6	TUR; 5	GBR; 6	ESP; 10	AUS; 11				6th	84
2019	Hyundai Shell Mobis WRT	Hyundai i20 Coupe WRC	MON; Ret	SWE; 4	MEX; Ret	FRA	ARG; 2	CHL; 7	POR	ITA; 3	FIN; 4	GER; 6	TUR; 3	GBR; 6	ESP	AUS; C			4th	102
2020	Eurosol Racing Team Hungary	Škoda Fabia R5 Evo	MON	SWE	MEX	EST	TUR	ITA	MNZ; 6										15th	8
2021	Toksport WRT	Škoda Fabia R5 Evo	MON; 7	ARC; 11	CRO; 39	POR; WD	ITA; Ret	KEN; WD	EST; 9	BEL	GRE; 9	FIN	ESP	MNZ; 16					17th	10
2022	Toksport WRT	Škoda Fabia Rally2 evo	MON; 7	SWE; 7	CRO	POR; Ret	ITA; Ret	KEN	EST; 8	FIN	BEL; 7	GRE; 13	NZL	ESP	JPN				14th	25
2023	Toksport WRT 3	Škoda Fabia RS Rally2	MON	SWE	MEX	CRO	POR; 8	ITA; 5	KEN	EST; 9	FIN; 10	GRE; 7	CHL	EUR; 23	JPN; 7				11th	29
2024	Hyundai Shell Mobis WRT	Hyundai i20 N Rally1	MON; 6	SWE	KEN	CRO; 6	POR	ITA	POL; 6	LAT	FIN	GRE	CHL	EUR; 31	JPN; 31				11th	40
2026	Toksport WRT	Škoda Fabia RS Rally2	MON	SWE	KEN; 8	CRO; 14	ESP	POR; 13	JPN	GRE; 10	EST	FIN	PAR	CHL	ITA; WD	SAU; C			24th	5

* Season still in progress.

=== PWRC results ===
Year	Entrant	Car	1	2	3	4	5	6	7	8	Pos.	Points
2009	Andreas Mikkelsen	Subaru Impreza WRX STi	NOR; Ret	CYP	POR	ARG	ITA	GRE	AUS	GBR	NC	0

=== SWRC results ===
Year	Entrant	Car	1	2	3	4	5	6	7	8	9	10	Pos.	Points
2010	Czech Ford National Team	Škoda Fabia S2000	SWE	MEX	JOR	NZL	POR	FIN	GER	JPN	FRA	GBR; 1	11th	25

=== WRC2 results ===
Year	Entrant	Car	1	2	3	4	5	6	7	8	9	10	11	12	13	14	Pos.	Points
2017	Škoda Motorsport	Škoda Fabia R5	MON; 1	SWE	MEX	FRA; 1	ARG	POR; Ret	ITA	POL	FIN	GER	ESP	GBR	AUS		9th	50
2021	Toksport WRT	Škoda Fabia R5 Evo	MON; 1	ARC; 2	CRO; 5	POR; WD	ITA; Ret	KEN; WD	EST; 1	BEL	GRE; 1	FIN	ESP	MNZ; 2			1st	149
2022	Toksport WRT	Škoda Fabia Rally2 evo	MON; 1	SWE; 1	CRO	POR; Ret	ITA; Ret	KEN	EST; 1	FIN	BEL; 2	GRE; 7	NZL	ESP	JPN		2nd	109
2023	Toksport WRT 3	Škoda Fabia RS Rally2	MON	SWE	MEX	CRO	POR; 3	ITA; 1	KEN	EST; 1	FIN; 4	GRE; 1	CHL	EUR; 13	JPN; 1		1st	137
2026	Toksport WRT	Škoda Fabia RS Rally2	MON	SWE	KEN; 4	CRO; 11	ESP	POR; 3	JPN	GRE; 2	EST	FIN	PAR	CHL	ITA; WD	SAU; C	11th	44

* Season still in progress.

=== WRC3 results ===
Year	Entrant	Car	1	2	3	4	5	6	7	Pos.	Points
2020	Eurosol Racing Team Hungary	Škoda Fabia R5 Evo	MON	SWE	MEX	EST	TUR	ITA	MNZ; 1	8th	25

=== Complete IRC results ===
Year	Entrant	Car	1	2	3	4	5	6	7	8	9	10	11	12	13	Pos.	Points
2009	Andreas Mikkelsen	Opel Corsa S2000	MON	BRA	KEN	POR	BEL	RUS	POR	CZE; 33	ESP	ITA	SCO			–	0
2010	Andreas Mikkelsen	Ford Fiesta S2000	MON	CUR	ARG	CAN	SAR; Ret	YPR; 5	AZO; 4	MAD	ZLI; 5	SAN; Ret	SCO; 2	CYP; Ret		7th	21
2011	Škoda UK	Škoda Fabia S2000	MON; Ret	CAN; 6	COR; 6	YAL; 4	YPR; Ret	AZO; 2	ZLI; 5	MEC; Ret	SAN; 2	SCO; 1	CYP; 1			1st	153.5
2012	Škoda UK	Škoda Fabia S2000	AZO; 1	CAN; 2	IRL; 2	COR; 5	TAR; 2	YPR; Ret	SMR; 2	ROM; 1	ZLI; 8	YAL	SLI	SAN	CYP; 2	1st	150

=== ERC results ===
Year	Entrant	Car	1	2	3	4	5	6	7	8	WDC	Points
2020	Topp-Cars Rally Team	Škoda Fabia R5 Evo	ITA	LAT	PRT	HUN; 1	ESP; 6				5th	52
2021	Toksport WRT	Škoda Fabia R5 Evo	POL; 2	LAT; 5	ITA; 8	CZE; 2	PRT1; 1	PRT2; 1	HUN; 6	ESP	1st	191

Sporting positions
Preceded by Juho Hänninen	Intercontinental Rally Challenge Champion; 2011–2012	Succeeded by Incumbent
