= 2022 Rally Italia Sardegna =

19th edition of Rally Italia Sardegna

2022 Rally Italia Sardegna Rally Italia Sardegna 2022
Round 5 of 13 in the 2022 World Rally Championship
← Previous event	Next event →
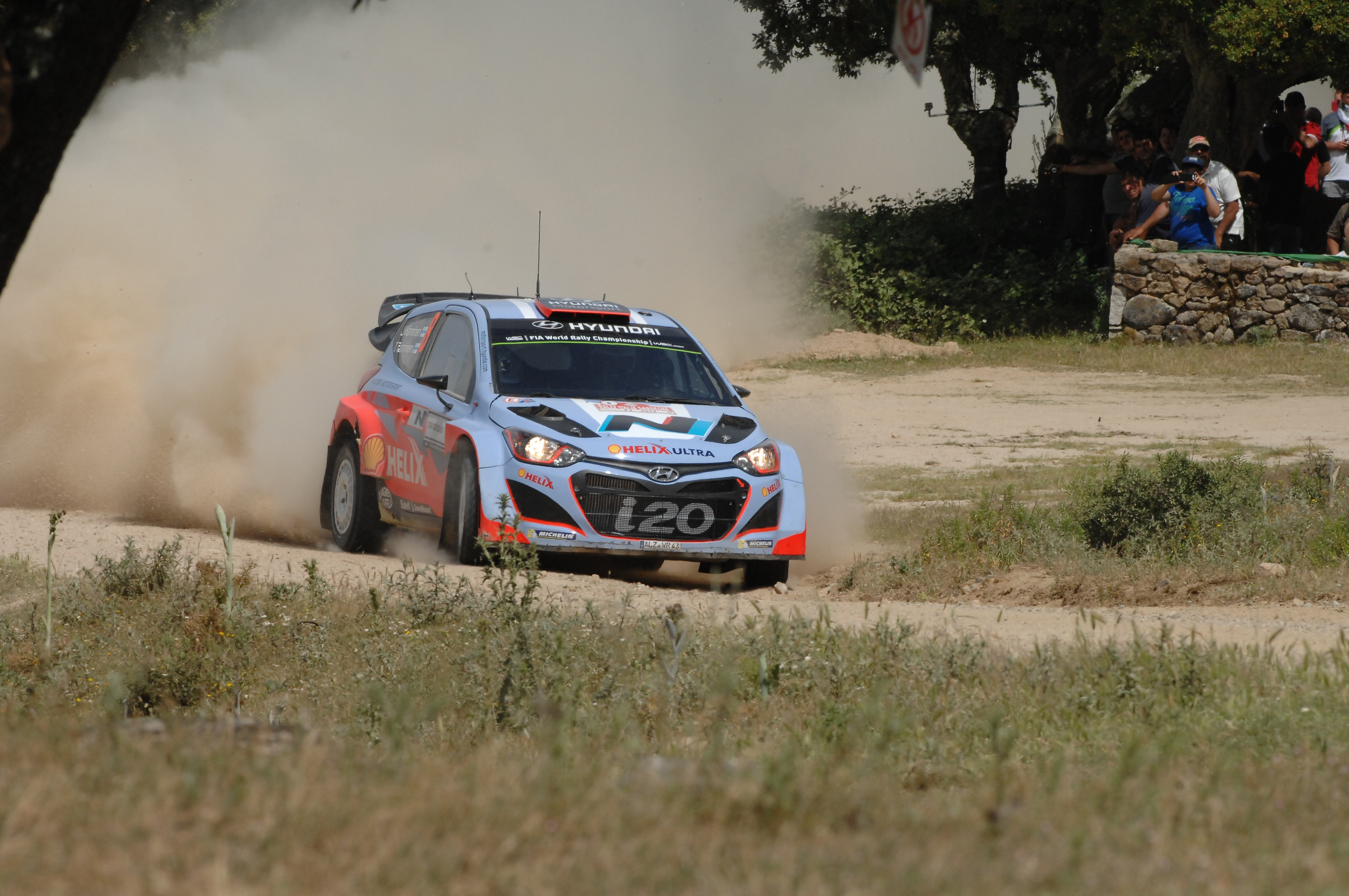
- The rally's headquarter would be relocated back to Alghero.
- Host country: Italy
- Rally base: Alghero, Sardinia
- Dates run: 2 – 5 June 2022
- Start location: Olbia, Sassari
- Finish location: Sassari, Sassari
- Stages: 21 (307.91 km; 191.33 miles)
- Stage surface: Gravel
- Transport distance: 995.47 km (618.56 miles)
- Overall distance: 1,303.38 km (809.88 miles)

Statistics
- Crews registered: 60
- Crews: 59 at start, 46 at finish
- Cancellation: SS8 and SS9 cancelled due to safety concern.

Overall results
- Overall winner: (Estonia) Ott Tänak (Estonia) Martin Järveoja (South Korea) Hyundai Shell Mobis WRT; 3:10:59.1
- Power Stage winner: (Belgium) Thierry Neuville (Belgium) Martijn Wydaeghe (South Korea) Hyundai Shell Mobis WRT; 5:01.0

Support category results
- WRC-2 winner: Nikolay Gryazin; Konstantin Aleksandrov (Germany) Toksport WRT 2; 3:18:36.8
- WRC-3 winner: (Czech Republic) Jan Černý (Czech Republic) Tomáš Střeska; 3:44:23.5

The 2022 Rally Italia Sardegna (also known as the Rally Italia Sardegna 2022) was a motor racing event for rally cars held from 2 June to 5 June 2022. It was the nineteenth running of the Rally Italia Sardegna. The event was the fifth round of the 2022 World Rally Championship, World Rally Championship-2 and World Rally Championship-3. The event was based in Alghero in Sardinia and was contested over twenty-one special stages covering a total competitive distance of 307.91 km (191.33 mi).

Sébastien Ogier and Julien Ingrassia were the defending rally winners. However, they did not defend their title as Ogier undertakes a partial program in 2022 and Ingrassia retired from the sport at the end of the 2021 season. Jari Huttunen and Mikko Lukka were the defending rally winners in the WRC-2 category. Yohan Rossel and Alexandre Coria were the defending rally winners in the WRC-3 category, but Coria was unable to defend his title as he stepped up to the top-tier to co-drive with Adrien Fourmaux for M-Sport.

Ott Tänak and Martin Järveoja won the rally, their first of the season. Their team, Hyundai Shell Mobis WRT, were the manufacturer's winners. Nikolay Gryazin and Konstantin Aleksandrov won the World Rally Championship-2 category. Jan Černý and Tomáš Střeska won the World Rally Championship-3 category.

== Background ==
=== Entry list ===
The following crews were entered into the rally. The event was open to crews competing in the World Rally Championship, its support categories, the World Rally Championship-2 and World Rally Championship-3, and privateer entries that are not registered to score points in any championship. Eleven cars were entered under Rally1 regulations, and thirty-six Rally2 crews in the World Rally Championship-2 and four Rally3 crews in the World Rally Championship-3.

Rally1 entries competing in the World Rally Championship
No.	Driver	Co-Driver	Entrant	Car	Championship eligibility	Tyre
4	(Finland) Esapekka Lappi	(Finland) Janne Ferm	(Japan) Toyota Gazoo Racing WRT	Toyota GR Yaris Rally1	Driver, Co-driver, Manufacturer	P
6	(Spain) Dani Sordo	(Spain) Cándido Carrera	(South Korea) Hyundai Shell Mobis WRT	Hyundai i20 N Rally1	Driver, Co-driver, Manufacturer	P
7	(France) Pierre-Louis Loubet	(France) Vincent Landais	(United Kingdom) M-Sport Ford WRT	Ford Puma Rally1	Driver, Co-driver	P
8	(Estonia) Ott Tänak	(Estonia) Martin Järveoja	(South Korea) Hyundai Shell Mobis WRT	Hyundai i20 N Rally1	Driver, Co-driver, Manufacturer	P
11	(Belgium) Thierry Neuville	(Belgium) Martijn Wydaeghe	(South Korea) Hyundai Shell Mobis WRT	Hyundai i20 N Rally1	Driver, Co-driver, Manufacturer	P
16	(France) Adrien Fourmaux	(France) Alexandre Coria	(United Kingdom) M-Sport Ford WRT	Ford Puma Rally1	Driver, Co-driver, Manufacturer	P
18	(Japan) Takamoto Katsuta	(Republic of Ireland) Aaron Johnston	(Japan) Toyota Gazoo Racing WRT NG	Toyota GR Yaris Rally1	Driver, Co-driver, Manufacturer/Team	P
33	(United Kingdom) Elfyn Evans	(United Kingdom) Scott Martin	(Japan) Toyota Gazoo Racing WRT	Toyota GR Yaris Rally1	Driver, Co-driver, Manufacturer	P
42	(Republic of Ireland) Craig Breen	(Republic of Ireland) Paul Nagle	(United Kingdom) M-Sport Ford WRT	Ford Puma Rally1	Driver, Co-driver, Manufacturer	P
44	(United Kingdom) Gus Greensmith	(Sweden) Jonas Andersson	(United Kingdom) M-Sport Ford WRT	Ford Puma Rally1	Driver, Co-driver, Manufacturer	P
69	(Finland) Kalle Rovanperä	(Finland) Jonne Halttunen	(Japan) Toyota Gazoo Racing WRT	Toyota GR Yaris Rally1	Driver, Co-driver, Manufacturer	P

Rally2 entries competing in the World Rally Championship-2
No.	Driver	Co-Driver	Entrant	Car	Championship eligibility	Tyre
20	(Norway) Andreas Mikkelsen	(Norway) Torstein Eriksen	(Germany) Toksport WRT	Škoda Fabia Rally2 evo	Driver, Co-driver, Team	P
21	Nikolay Gryazin (Note: Nikolay Gryazin is Russian, but he competes as a neutral competitor using the ANA flag as Russian national emblems were banned by the association due to the Russian invasion of Ukraine.)	Konstantin Aleksandrov (Note: Konstantin Aleksandrov is Russian, but he competes as a neutral competitor using the ANA flag as Russian national emblems were banned by the association due to the Russian invasion of Ukraine.)	(Germany) Toksport WRT 2	Škoda Fabia Rally2 evo	Junior Driver, Co-driver, Team	P
22	(Finland) Teemu Suninen	(Finland) Mikko Markkula	(South Korea) Hyundai Motorsport N	Hyundai i20 N Rally2	Driver, Co-driver, Team	P
23	(Bolivia) Marco Bulacia	(Argentina) Marcelo Der Ohannesian	(Germany) Toksport WRT	Škoda Fabia Rally2 evo	Junior Driver, Co-driver, Team	P
24	(France) Eric Camilli	(France) Thibault de la Haye	(France) Saintéloc Junior Team	Citroën C3 Rally2	Driver, Co-driver	—N/a
25	(France) Yohan Rossel	(France) Valentin Sarreaud	(France) PH Sport	Citroën C3 Rally2	Driver, Co-driver	P
26	(Czech Republic) Erik Cais	(Czech Republic) Petr Těšínský	(Czech Republic) Yacco ACCR Team	Ford Fiesta Rally2	Junior Driver, Co-driver	P
27	(Finland) Jari Huttunen	(Finland) Mikko Lukka	(United Kingdom) M-Sport Ford WRT	Ford Fiesta Rally2	Driver, Co-driver	P
28	(Spain) Jan Solans	(Spain) Rodrigo Sanjuan de Eusebio	(Spain) Jan Solans	Citroën C3 Rally2	Junior Driver, Co-driver	P
29	(Estonia) Georg Linnamäe	(United Kingdom) James Morgan	(Estonia) ALM Motorsport	Volkswagen Polo GTI R5	Junior Driver, Co-driver	P
30	(United Kingdom) Chris Ingram	(United Kingdom) Craig Drew	(United Kingdom) Chris Ingram	Škoda Fabia Rally2 evo	Junior Driver, Co-driver	P
31	(Bolivia) Bruno Bulacia	(Spain) Marc Martí	(Bolivia) Bruno Bulacia	Škoda Fabia Rally2 evo	Junior Driver, Co-driver	P
32	(Finland) Eerik Pietarinen	(Finland) Antti Linnaketo	(Finland) Eerik Pietarinen	Volkswagen Polo GTI R5	Junior Driver, Co-driver	P
34	(Finland) Sami Pajari	(Finland) Enni Mälkönen	(Finland) Sami Pajari	Škoda Fabia Rally2 evo	Junior Driver, Co-driver	P
35	(Republic of Ireland) Josh McErlean	(Republic of Ireland) James Fulton	(Republic of Ireland) Josh McErlean	Hyundai i20 N Rally2	Junior Driver, Junior Co-driver	P
36	(Poland) Mikołaj Marczyk	(Poland) Szymon Gospodarczyk	(Poland) Mikołaj Marczyk	Škoda Fabia Rally2 evo	Junior Driver, Co-driver	P
37	(Paraguay) Fabrizio Zaldívar	(Spain) Carlos del Barrio	(South Korea) Hyundai Motorsport N	Hyundai i20 N Rally2	Junior Driver, Co-driver, Team	P
38	(Chile) Emilio Fernández	(Spain) Axel Coronado Jiménez	(Chile) Emilio Fernández	Škoda Fabia Rally2 evo	Driver, Co-driver	P
39	(Czech Republic) Martin Prokop	(Czech Republic) Michal Ernst	(Czech Republic) Martin Prokop	Ford Fiesta Rally2	Driver, Co-driver	P
40	(Poland) Daniel Chwist	(Poland) Kamil Heller	(Poland) Daniel Chwist	Škoda Fabia Rally2 evo	Driver, Co-driver	P
41	(Italy) Mauro Miele	(Italy) Luca Beltrame	(Italy) Mauro Miele	Škoda Fabia Rally2 evo	Masters Driver, Co-driver	P
43	(Germany) Armin Kremer	(Germany) Ella Kremer	(Germany) Armin Kremer	Škoda Fabia Rally2 evo	Masters Driver, Co-driver	P
45	(Belgium) Freddy Loix	(Belgium) Pieter Tsjoen	(Belgium) Freddy Loix	Škoda Fabia Rally2 evo	Masters Driver, Co-driver	P
46	(Saudi Arabia) Rakan Al-Rashed	(Portugal) Hugo Magalhães	(Saudi Arabia) Rakan Al-Rashed	Volkswagen Polo GTI R5	Driver, Co-driver	P
47	(Australia) Luke Anear	(Australia) Andrew Sarandis	(Australia) Luke Anear	Ford Fiesta Rally2	Driver, Co-driver	P
48	(France) Frédéric Rosati	(Belgium) Stéphane Prévot	(France) Frédéric Rosati	Hyundai i20 N Rally2	Masters Driver, Masters Co-driver	P
49	(France) Laurent Battut	(Belgium) Eric Gressens	(France) Laurent Battut	Hyundai i20 R5	Masters Driver, Masters Co-driver	P
50	(Greece) Jourdan Serderidis	(Belgium) Frédéric Miclotte	(Greece) Jourdan Serderidis	Škoda Fabia Rally2 evo	Masters Driver, Co-driver	P
51	(Spain) Eduard Pons Suñe	(Spain) Alberto Chamorro	(Spain) Eduard Pons Suñe	Škoda Fabia Rally2 evo	Driver, Co-driver	P
52	(France) Jean-Michel Raoux	(France) Laurent Magat	(France) Jean-Michel Raoux	Volkswagen Polo GTI R5	Masters Driver, Masters Co-driver	P
53	(Italy) Silvano Patera	(Italy) Danilo Fappani	(Italy) Silvano Patera	Škoda Fabia Rally2 evo	Driver, Co-driver	P
54	(Italy) Simone Romagna	(Italy) Luca Addondi	(Italy) Simone Romagna	Škoda Fabia Rally2 evo	Driver, Co-driver	P
55	(Italy) Pablo Biolghini	(Italy) Stefano Pudda	(Italy) Pablo Biolghini	Škoda Fabia Rally2 evo	Driver, Co-driver	P
56	(Spain) Miguel Díaz-Aboitiz	(Spain) Jordi Hereu	(Spain) Miguel Díaz-Aboitiz	Škoda Fabia Rally2 evo	Masters Driver, Co-driver	P
57	(Italy) Carlo Covi	(Italy) Andrea Budoia	(Italy) Carlo Covi	Škoda Fabia R5	Masters Driver, Co-driver	P
58	(Italy) Francesco Tali	(Italy) Cristina Caldart	(Italy) Francesco Tali	Ford Fiesta Rally2	Masters Driver, Co-driver	P

Rally3 entries competing in the World Rally Championship-3
No.	Driver	Co-Driver	Entrant	Car	Championship eligibility	Tyre
59	(Czech Republic) Jan Černý	(Czech Republic) Tomáš Střeska	(Czech Republic) Jan Černý	Ford Fiesta Rally3	Open	P
60	(Paraguay) Diego Dominguez Jr.	(Spain) Rogelio Peñate	(Paraguay) Diego Dominguez Jr.	Ford Fiesta Rally3	Open	P
61	(Hungary) Zoltán László	(Hungary) Tamás Kürti	(Hungary) Zoltán László	Ford Fiesta Rally3	Open	P
62	(Italy) Enrico Brazzoli	(Italy) Manuel Fenoli	(Italy) Enrico Brazzoli	Ford Fiesta Rally3	Open	P

=== Itinerary ===
All dates and times are CEST (UTC+2).

Date	Time	No.	Stage name	Distance
2 June	9:01	—	Olmedo [Shakedown]	3.58 km
2 June	18:08	SS1	Olbia – Cabu Abbas	3.23 km
3 June	7:01	SS2	Terranova 1	14.19 km
3 June	8:01	SS3	Monti di Alà e Buddusò 1	24.70 km
3 June	9:46	SS4	Terranova 2	14.19 km
3 June	10:46	SS5	Monti di Alà e Buddusò 2	24.70 km
3 June	15:18	SS6	Osilo – Tergu 1	14.63 km
3 June	16:01	SS7	Sedini – Castelsardo 1	13.26 km
3 June	17:48	SS8	Osilo – Tergu 2	14.63 km
3 June	18:31	SS9	Sedini – Castelsardo 2	13.26 km
4 June	7:36	SS10	Tempio Pausania 1	12.03 km
4 June	8:36	SS11	Erula – Tula 1	15.27 km
4 June	10:33	SS12	Tempio Pausania 2	12.03 km
4 June	11:31	SS13	Erula – Tula 2	15.27 km
4 June	13:38	SS14	Coiluna – Loelle 1	21.60 km
4 June	14:46	SS15	Monte Lerno di Pattada 1	17.01 km
4 June	16:08	SS16	Coiluna – Loelle 2	21.60 km
4 June	17:16	SS17	Monte Lerno di Pattada 2	17.01 km
5 June	8:10	SS18	Cala Flumini 1	12.55 km
5 June	9:08	SS19	Sassari – Argentiera 1	7.10 km
5 June	11:10	SS20	Cala Flumini 2	12.55 km
5 June	12:18	SS21	Sassari – Argentiera 2	7.10 km

== Report ==
=== WRC Rally1 ===
==== Classification ====
Position		No.	Driver	Co-driver	Entrant	Car	Time	Difference	Points	
Event	Class	No.	Driver	Co-driver	Entrant	Car	Time	Difference	Event	Stage
1	1	8	Ott Tänak	Martin Järveoja	Hyundai Shell Mobis WRT	Hyundai i20 N Rally1	3:10.59.1	0.0	25	0
2	2	42	Craig Breen	Paul Nagle	M-Sport Ford WRT	Ford Puma Rally1	3:12:02.3	+1:03.2	18	0
3	3	6	Dani Sordo	Cándido Carrera	Hyundai Shell Mobis WRT	Hyundai i20 N Rally1	3:12:32.1	+1:33.0	15	0
4	4	7	Pierre-Louis Loubet	Vincent Landais	M-Sport Ford WRT	Ford Puma Rally1	3:13:08.5	+2:09.4	12	0
5	5	69	Kalle Rovanperä	Jonne Halttunen	Toyota Gazoo Racing WRT	Toyota GR Yaris Rally1	3:14:01.9	+3:02.8	10	4
6	6	18	Takamoto Katsuta	Aaron Johnston	Toyota Gazoo Racing WRT NG	Toyota GR Yaris Rally1	3:15:01.7	+4:02.6	8	1
7	7	44	Gus Greensmith	Jonas Andersson	M-Sport Ford WRT	Ford Puma Rally1	3:16:22.7	+5:23.6	6	0
40	8	33	Elfyn Evans	Scott Martin	Toyota Gazoo Racing WRT	Toyota GR Yaris Rally1	4:12:21.7	+1:01:22.6	0	3
41	9	11	Thierry Neuville	Martijn Wydaeghe	Hyundai Shell Mobis WRT	Hyundai i20 N Rally1	4:14:37.1	+1:03:38.0	0	5
41	10	4	Esapekka Lappi	Janne Ferm	Toyota Gazoo Racing WRT	Toyota GR Yaris Rally1	4:30:44.1	+1:19:45.0	0	2
Retired SS17		16	Adrien Fourmaux	Alexandre Coria	M-Sport Ford WRT	Ford Puma Rally1	Crash		0	0

==== Special stages ====
Stage	Winners	Car	Time	Class leaders
SD	Neuville / Wydaeghe	Hyundai i20 N Rally1	2:15.4	—N/a
SS1	Neuville / Wydaeghe	Hyundai i20 N Rally1	2:26.8	Neuville / Wydaeghe
SS2	Evans / Martin	Toyota GR Yaris Rally1	9:22.7	Evans / Martin
SS3	Lappi / Ferm	Toyota GR Yaris Rally1	15:06.4	Lappi / Ferm
SS4	Sordo / Carrera	Hyundai i20 N Rally1	9:08.3	Tänak / Järveoja
SS5	Sordo / Carrera	Hyundai i20 N Rally1	14:49.2	Tänak / Järveoja
SS6	Tänak / Järveoja	Hyundai i20 N Rally1	9:29.7	Tänak / Järveoja
SS7	Lappi / Ferm	Toyota GR Yaris Rally1	9:54.7	Lappi / Ferm
SS8	Stage cancelled			
SS9	Stage cancelled			
SS10	Tänak / Järveoja	Hyundai i20 N Rally1	9:57.9	Tänak / Järveoja
SS11	Tänak / Järveoja	Hyundai i20 N Rally1	11:34.7	Tänak / Järveoja
SS12	Breen / Nagle	Ford Puma Rally1	9:52.7	Tänak / Järveoja
SS13	Tänak / Järveoja	Hyundai i20 N Rally1	11:26.2	Tänak / Järveoja
SS14	Tänak / Järveoja	Hyundai i20 N Rally1	13:44.6	Tänak / Järveoja
SS15	Tänak / Järveoja	Hyundai i20 N Rally1	11:26.7	Tänak / Järveoja
SS16	Tänak / Järveoja	Hyundai i20 N Rally1	13:29.9	Tänak / Järveoja
SS17	Stage interrupted			
SS18	Tänak / Järveoja	Hyundai i20 N Rally1	8:30.2	Tänak / Järveoja
SS19	Neuville / Wydaeghe	Hyundai i20 N Rally1	5:07.9	Tänak / Järveoja
SS20	Tänak / Järveoja	Hyundai i20 N Rally1	8:23.2	Tänak / Järveoja
SS21	Neuville / Wydaeghe	Hyundai i20 N Rally1	5:01.0	Tänak / Järveoja

==== Championship standings ====
Pos.	Drivers' championships			Co-drivers' championships			Manufacturers' championships		
Pos.	Move	Driver	Points	Move	Co-driver	Points	Move	Manufacturer	Points
1		Kalle Rovanperä	120		Jonne Halttunen	120		Toyota Gazoo Racing WRT	200
2		Thierry Neuville	65		Martijn Wydaeghe	65		Hyundai Shell Mobis WRT	161
3	1	Ott Tänak	62	1	Martin Järveoja	62		M-Sport Ford WRT	119
4	2	Craig Breen	52	2	Paul Nagle	52		Toyota Gazoo Racing WRT NG	53
5	2	Takamoto Katsuta	47	2	Aaron Johnston	47			

=== WRC-2 Rally2 ===
==== Classification ====
Position		No.	Driver	Co-driver	Entrant	Car	Time	Difference	Points		
Event	Class	No.	Driver	Co-driver	Entrant	Car	Time	Difference	Class	Stage	Event
8	1	21	Nikolay Gryazin	Konstantin Aleksandrov	Nikolay Gryazin	Škoda Fabia Rally2 evo	3:18:36.8	0.0	25	0	4
9	2	28	Jan Solans	Rodrigo Sanjuan de Eusebio	Jan Solans	Citroën C3 Rally2	3:19:04.8	+8:05.7	18	0	2
10	3	27	Jari Huttunen	Mikko Lukka	M-Sport Ford WRT	Ford Fiesta Rally2	3:19:09.9	+8:10.8	15	3	1
11	4	30	Chris Ingram	Craig Drew	Chris Ingram	Škoda Fabia Rally2 evo	3:19:15.7	+8:16.6	12	1	0
12	5	34	Sami Pajari	Enni Mälkönen	Sami Pajari	Škoda Fabia Rally2 evo	3:20:15.3	+9:16.2	10	0	0
13	6	32	Eerik Pietarinen	Antti Linnaketo	Eerik Pietarinen	Volkswagen Polo GTI R5	3:21:13.6	+10:14.5	8	0	0
14	7	38	Emilio Fernández	Axel Coronado Jiménez	Emilio Fernández	Škoda Fabia Rally2 evo	3:22:01.9	+11:02.8	6	0	0
15	8	36	Mikołaj Marczyk	Szymon Gospodarczyk	Mikołaj Marczyk	Škoda Fabia Rally2 evo	3:24:03.8	+13:04.7	4	0	0
16	9	39	Martin Prokop	Michal Ernst	Martin Prokop	Ford Fiesta Rally2	3:25:52.8	+14:53.7	2	0	0
17	10	45	Freddy Loix	Pieter Tsjoen	Freddy Loix	Ford Fiesta Rally2	3:28:15.8	+17:16.7	1	0	0
18	11	25	Yohan Rossel	Valentin Sarreaud	PH Sport	Citroën C3 Rally2	3:28:48.2	+17:49.1	0	2	0
19	12	46	Rakan Al-Rashed	Hugo Magalhães	Rakan Al-Rashed	Volkswagen Polo GTI R5	3:29:02.7	+18:03.6	0	0	0
20	13	50	Jourdan Serderidis	Frédéric Miclotte	Jourdan Serderidis	Škoda Fabia Rally2 evo	3:33:56.4	+22:57.3	0	0	0
21	14	52	Jean-Michel Raoux	Laurent Magat	Jean-Michel Raoux	Volkswagen Polo GTI R5	3:34:37.6	+23:38.5	0	0	0
22	15	51	Eduard Pons Suñe	Alberto Chamorro	Eduard Pons Suñe	Škoda Fabia Rally2 evo	3:34:50.1	+23:51.0	0	0	0
23	16	55	Pablo Biolghini	Stefano Pudda	Pablo Biolghini	Škoda Fabia Rally2 evo	3:37:27.0	+26:27.9	0	0	0
24	17	53	Silvano Patera	Danilo Fappani	Silvano Patera	Škoda Fabia Rally2 evo	3:43:36.3	+32:37.2	0	0	0
26	18	40	Daniel Chwist	Kamil Heller	Daniel Chwist	Škoda Fabia Rally2 evo	3:44:56.7	+33:57.6	0	0	0
27	19	23	Marco Bulacia	Marcelo Der Ohannesian	Toksport WRT	Škoda Fabia Rally2 evo	3:45:01.0	+34:01.9	0	0	0
28	20	35	Josh McErlean	James Fulton	Josh McErlean	Hyundai i20 N Rally2	3:46:59.9	+36:00.8	0	0	0
29	21	47	Luke Anear	Andrew Sarandis	Luke Anear	Ford Fiesta Rally2	3:47:50.2	+36:51.1	0	0	0
33	22	37	Fabrizio Zaldívar	Carlos del Barrio	Hyundai Motorsport N	Hyundai i20 N Rally2	4:01:07.2	+50:08.1	0	0	0
34	23	58	Francesco Tali	Cristina Caldart	Francesco Tali	Hyundai i20 N Rally2	4:01:56.7	+50:57.6	0	0	0
36	24	56	Miguel Díaz-Aboitiz	Jordi Hereu	Miguel Díaz-Aboitiz	Škoda Fabia Rally2 evo	4:06:54.8	+55:55.7	0	0	0
38	25	22	Teemu Suninen	Mikko Markkula	Hyundai Motorsport N	Hyundai i20 N Rally2	4:10:50.5	+59:51.4	0	0	0
39	26	57	Carlo Covi	Andrea Budoia	Carlo Covi	Škoda Fabia R5	4:11:44.2	1:00:45.1	0	0	0
Retired SS18		41	Mauro Miele	Luca Beltrame	Mauro Miele	Škoda Fabia Rally2 evo	Mechanical		0	0	0
Retired SS17		31	Bruno Bulacia	Marc Martí	Bruno Bulacia	Škoda Fabia Rally2 evo	Mechanical		0	0	0
Retired SS16		48	Frédéric Rosati	Stéphane Prévot	Frédéric Rosati	Hyundai i20 N Rally2	Mechanical		0	0	0
Retired SS14		26	Erik Cais	Petr Těšínský	Yacco ACCR Team	Ford Fiesta Rally2	Fire		0	0	0
Retired SS13		20	Andreas Mikkelsen	Torstein Eriksen	Toksport WRT	Škoda Fabia Rally2 evo	Mechanical		0	0	0
Retired SS12		29	Georg Linnamäe	James Morgan	ALM Motorsport	Volkswagen Polo GTI R5	Crash		0	0	0
Retired SS11		54	Simone Romagna	Luca Addondi	Simone Romagna	Škoda Fabia Rally2 evo	Mechanical		0	0	0
Retired SS6		49	Laurent Battut	Eric Gressens	Laurent Battut	Hyundai i20 R5	Fire		0	0	0
Did not start		43	Armin Kremer	Ella Kremer	Armin Kremer	Škoda Fabia Rally2 evo	Engine		0	0	0
Did not start		24	Eric Camilli	Thibault de la Haye	Saintéloc Junior Team	Citroën C3 Rally2	Withdrawn		0	0	0

==== Special stages ====
Stage	Open Championship				Junior Championship				Masters Cup			
Stage	Winners	Car	Time	Class leaders	Winners	Car	Time	Class leaders	Winners	Car	Time	Class leaders
SD	B. Bulacia / Martí	Škoda Fabia Rally2 evo	2:27.0	—N/a	B. Bulacia / Martí	Škoda Fabia Rally2 evo	2:27.0	—N/a	Miele / Beltrame	Škoda Fabia Rally2 evo	2:31.4	—N/a
SS1	M. Bulacia / Der Ohannesian	Škoda Fabia Rally2 evo	2:32.8	M. Bulacia / Der Ohannesian	M. Bulacia / Der Ohannesian	Škoda Fabia Rally2 evo	2:32.8	M. Bulacia / Der Ohannesian	Loix / Tsjoen	Škoda Fabia Rally2 evo	2:38.6	Loix / Tsjoen
SS2	Ingram / Drew	Škoda Fabia Rally2 evo	9:51.6	Mikkelsen / Eriksen	Ingram / Drew	Škoda Fabia Rally2 evo	9:51.6	Ingram / Drew	Loix / Tsjoen	Škoda Fabia Rally2 evo	10:35.4	Loix / Tsjoen
SS3	Rossel / Sarreaud	Citroën C3 Rally2	15:39.2	Mikkelsen / Eriksen	Gryazin / Aleksandrov	Škoda Fabia Rally2 evo	15:44.9	Ingram / Drew	Loix / Tsjoen	Škoda Fabia Rally2 evo	16:42.8	Loix / Tsjoen
SS4	Mikkelsen / Eriksen	Škoda Fabia Rally2 evo	9:27.9	Mikkelsen / Eriksen	Gryazin / Aleksandrov	Škoda Fabia Rally2 evo	9:28.9	Gryazin / Aleksandrov	Loix / Tsjoen	Škoda Fabia Rally2 evo	10:12.1	Loix / Tsjoen
SS5	Stage cancelled											
SS6	Mikkelsen / Eriksen	Škoda Fabia Rally2 evo	9:42.6	Mikkelsen / Eriksen	Pajari / Mälkönen	Škoda Fabia Rally2 evo	9:44.4	Gryazin / Aleksandrov	Loix / Tsjoen	Škoda Fabia Rally2 evo	10:08.2	Loix / Tsjoen
SS7	Mikkelsen / Eriksen	Škoda Fabia Rally2 evo	10:13.0	Mikkelsen / Eriksen	Gryazin / Aleksandrov	Škoda Fabia Rally2 evo	10:15.9	Gryazin / Aleksandrov	Loix / Tsjoen	Škoda Fabia Rally2 evo	10:52.2	Loix / Tsjoen
SS8	Stage cancelled											
SS9	Stage cancelled											
SS10	Suninen / Markkula	Hyundai i20 N Rally2	10:18.3	Mikkelsen / Eriksen	Solans / Sanjuan de Eusebio	Citroën C3 Rally2	10:29.7	Gryazin / Aleksandrov	Stage interrupted			
SS11	Suninen / Markkula	Hyundai i20 N Rally2	12:02.3	Mikkelsen / Eriksen	M. Bulacia / Der Ohannesian	Škoda Fabia Rally2 evo	12:07.1	Gryazin / Aleksandrov	Loix / Tsjoen	Škoda Fabia Rally2 evo	12:37.5	Loix / Tsjoen
SS12	Huttunen / Lukka	Ford Fiesta Rally2	10:05.8	Mikkelsen / Eriksen	Gryazin / Aleksandrov	Škoda Fabia Rally2 evo	10:10.3	Gryazin / Aleksandrov	Stage interrupted			
SS13	Gryazin / Aleksandrov	Škoda Fabia Rally2 evo	11:51.7	Gryazin / Aleksandrov	Gryazin / Aleksandrov	Škoda Fabia Rally2 evo	11:51.7	Gryazin / Aleksandrov	Loix / Tsjoen	Škoda Fabia Rally2 evo	12:24.0	Loix / Tsjoen
SS14	Huttunen / Lukka	Ford Fiesta Rally2	14:17.1	Gryazin / Aleksandrov	Gryazin / Aleksandrov	Škoda Fabia Rally2 evo	14:17.3	Gryazin / Aleksandrov	Stage interrupted			
SS15	Huttunen / Lukka	Ford Fiesta Rally2	11:44.4	Gryazin / Aleksandrov	Pietarinen / Linnaketo	Volkswagen Polo GTI R5	11:47.6	Gryazin / Aleksandrov	Loix / Tsjoen	Škoda Fabia Rally2 evo	12:23.7	Loix / Tsjoen
SS16	Gryazin / Aleksandrov	Škoda Fabia Rally2 evo	13:57.3	Gryazin / Aleksandrov	Gryazin / Aleksandrov	Škoda Fabia Rally2 evo	13:57.3	Gryazin / Aleksandrov	Loix / Tsjoen	Škoda Fabia Rally2 evo	14:47.4	Loix / Tsjoen
SS17	Gryazin / Aleksandrov	Škoda Fabia Rally2 evo	11:33.0	Gryazin / Aleksandrov	Gryazin / Aleksandrov	Škoda Fabia Rally2 evo	11:33.0	Gryazin / Aleksandrov	Loix / Tsjoen	Škoda Fabia Rally2 evo	12:21.3	Loix / Tsjoen
SS18	Huttunen / Lukka	Ford Fiesta Rally2	8:50.4	Gryazin / Aleksandrov	Solans / Sanjuan de Eusebio	Citroën C3 Rally2	8:52.9	Gryazin / Aleksandrov	Loix / Tsjoen	Škoda Fabia Rally2 evo	9:29.5	Loix / Tsjoen
SS19	Rossel / Sarreaud	Citroën C3 Rally2	5:28.9	Gryazin / Aleksandrov	Solans / Sanjuan de Eusebio	Citroën C3 Rally2	5:31.6	Gryazin / Aleksandrov	Loix / Tsjoen	Škoda Fabia Rally2 evo	6:06.2	Loix / Tsjoen
SS20	Ingram / Drew	Škoda Fabia Rally2 evo	8:34.8	Gryazin / Aleksandrov	Ingram / Drew	Škoda Fabia Rally2 evo	8:34.8	Gryazin / Aleksandrov	Loix / Tsjoen	Škoda Fabia Rally2 evo	9:16.1	Loix / Tsjoen
SS21	Huttunen / Lukka	Ford Fiesta Rally2	5:21.2	Gryazin / Aleksandrov	Ingram / Drew	Škoda Fabia Rally2 evo	5:24.9	Gryazin / Aleksandrov	Raoux / Magat	Volkswagen Polo GTI R5	5:58.2	Loix / Tsjoen

==== Championship standings ====
Pos.	Open Drivers' championships			Open Co-drivers' championships			Teams' championships			Junior Drivers' championships			Junior Co-drivers' championships			Driver Masters' championships			Co-driver Masters' championships		
Pos.	Move	Driver	Points	Move	Co-driver	Points	Move	Manufacturer	Points	Move	Manufacturer	Points	Move	Driver	Points	Move	Driver	Points	Move	Driver	Points
1		Yohan Rossel	63	1	Valentin Sarreaud	52		Toksport WRT	87		Chris Ingram	67	1	James Fulton	68		Mauro Miele	61		Laurent Magat	75
2	3	Nikolay Gryazin	52	2	Konstantin Aleksandrov	52		Toksport WRT 2	58	1	Nikolay Gryazin	61	1	Louis Louka	43		Jean-Michel Raoux	52		Michael Joseph Morrissey	36
3	1	Andreas Mikkelsen	51	2	Torstein Eriksen	51	2	Hyundai Motorsport N	58	1	Erik Cais	45		Elia De Guio	25	6	Freddy Loix	40		Michela Lorigiola	30
4		Chris Ingram	44	1	Maciej Szczepaniak	38	1	Yaco ACCR Team	50	1	Eerik Pietarinen	40		Samu Vaaleri	25	1	Olivier Burri	33		Jörgen Fornander	25
5	2	Kajetan Kajetanowicz	38		Craig Drew	38	1	Saintéloc Junior Team	40	2	Mikołaj Marczyk	36				1	Fabrizio Arengi	28		Hans van Goor	25

=== WRC-3 Rally3 ===
==== Classification ====
Position		No.	Driver	Co-driver	Entrant	Car	Time	Difference	Points
Event	Class	No.	Driver	Co-driver	Entrant	Car	Time	Difference	Open
25	1	59	Jan Černý	Tomáš Střeska	Jan Černý	Ford Fiesta Rally3	3:44:23.5	0.0	25
30	2	61	Zoltán László	Tamás Kürti	Zoltán László	Ford Fiesta Rally3	3:50:27.6	+6:04.1	18
Retired SS18		60	Diego Dominguez Jr.	Rogelio Peñate	Diego Dominguez Jr.	Ford Fiesta Rally3	Mechanical		0
Retired SS14		62	Enrico Brazzoli	Manuel Fenoli	Enrico Brazzoli	Ford Fiesta Rally3	Mechanical		0

==== Special stages ====
Stage	Open Championship			
Stage	Winners	Car	Time	Class leaders
SD	Dominguez / Peñate	Ford Fiesta Rally3	2:41.7	—N/a
SS1	Černý / Střeska	Ford Fiesta Rally3	2:45.5	Černý / Střeska
SS2	Dominguez / Peñate	Ford Fiesta Rally3	10:56.6	Dominguez / Peñate
SS3	Černý / Střeska	Ford Fiesta Rally3	17:21.1	Černý / Střeska
SS4	Černý / Střeska	Ford Fiesta Rally3	10:46.5	Černý / Střeska
SS5	Stage cancelled			
SS6	Stage cancelled			
SS7	Stage cancelled			
SS8	Stage cancelled			
SS9	Stage cancelled			
SS10	Stage cancelled			
SS11	Černý / Střeska	Ford Fiesta Rally3	13:14.1	Černý / Střeska
SS12	Stage cancelled			
SS13	Dominguez / Peñate	Ford Fiesta Rally3	13:08.3	Černý / Střeska
SS14	Stage cancelled			
SS15	Dominguez / Peñate	Ford Fiesta Rally3	12:48.9	Černý / Střeska
SS16	Dominguez / Peñate	Ford Fiesta Rally3	15:32.8	Dominguez / Peñate
SS17	Dominguez / Peñate	Ford Fiesta Rally3	12:52.6	Dominguez / Peñate
SS18	László / Kürti	Ford Fiesta Rally3	10:32.3	Černý / Střeska
SS19	Černý / Střeska	Ford Fiesta Rally3	6:54.7	Černý / Střeska
SS20	Černý / Střeska	Ford Fiesta Rally3	10:34.5	Černý / Střeska
SS21	Černý / Střeska	Ford Fiesta Rally3	7:10.9	Černý / Střeska

==== Championship standings ====
Pos.	Open Drivers' championships			Open Co-drivers' championships		
Pos.	Move	Driver	Points	Move	Co-driver	Points
1		Sami Pajari	62		Enni Mälkönen	62
2	5	Jan Černý	43		Mikael Korhonen	43
3	3	Zoltán László	43	2	Tamás Kürti	43
4	2	Lauri Joona	43	1	Manuel Fenoli	33
5	2	Enrico Brazzoli	33	1	Liam Regan	30

== Notes ==
Previous rally: 2022 Rally de Portugal	2022 FIA World Rally Championship	Next rally: 2022 Safari Rally
Previous rally: 2021 Rally Italia Sardegna	2022 Rally Italia Sardegna	Next rally: 2023 Rally Italia Sardegna
