= 2022 Rally de Portugal =

55th edition of Rally de Portugal

2022 Rally de Portugal Vodafone Rally de Portugal 2022
Round 4 of 13 in the 2022 World Rally Championship
← Previous event	Next event →
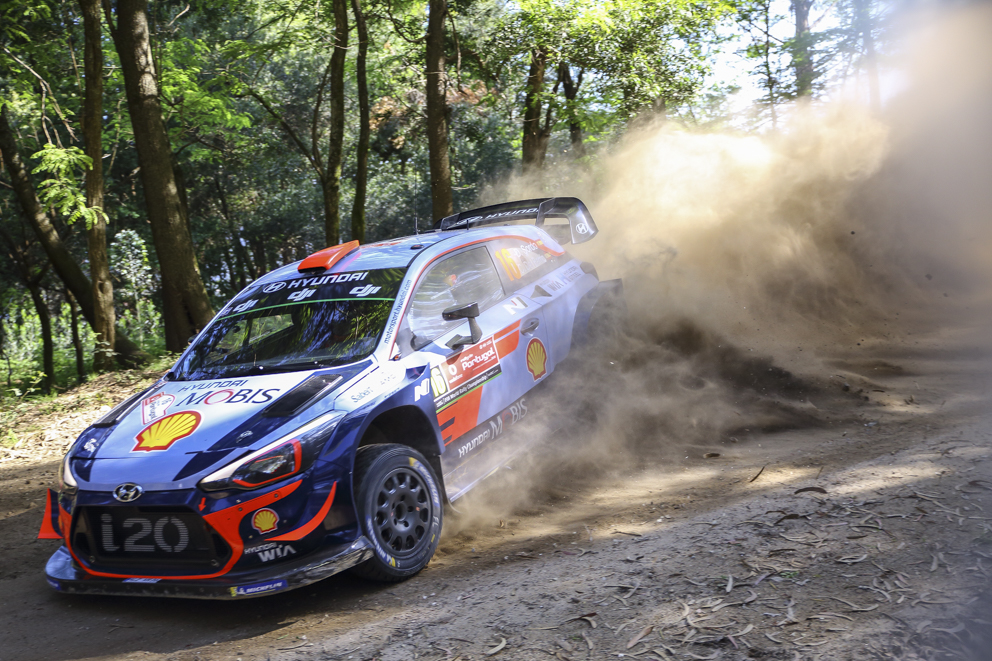
- Rally de Portugal is the first gravel event on the 2022 calendar.
- Host country: Portugal
- Rally base: Matosinhos, Porto
- Dates run: 19 – 22 May 2022
- Start location: Lousã, Coimbra
- Finish location: Fafe, Braga
- Stages: 21 (338 km; 210 miles)
- Stage surface: Gravel
- Transport distance: 1,188.35 km (738.41 miles)
- Overall distance: 1,518.52 km (943.56 miles)

Statistics
- Crews registered: 100
- Crews: 90 at start, 53 at finish

Overall results
- Overall winner: (Finland) Kalle Rovanperä (Finland) Jonne Halttunen (Japan) Toyota Gazoo Racing WRT; 3:44:19.2
- Power Stage winner: (Finland) Kalle Rovanperä (Finland) Jonne Halttunen (Japan) Toyota Gazoo Racing WRT; 6:28.2

Support category results
- WRC-2 winner: (France) Yohan Rossel (France) Valentin Sarreaud (France) PH Sport; 3:58:08.1
- WRC-3 winner: (Finland) Sami Pajari (Finland) Enni Mälkönen; 4:13:33.2
- J-WRC winner: (Finland) Sami Pajari (Finland) Enni Mälkönen; 4:13:33.2

The 2022 Rally de Portugal (also known as the Vodafone Rally de Portugal 2022) was a motor racing event for rally cars held over four days between 19 and 22 May 2022. It marked the fifty-fifth running of the Rally de Portugal. The event was the fourth round of the 2022 World Rally Championship, World Rally Championship-2 and World Rally Championship-3. The 2022 event was based in Matosinhos in the Porto District and was contested over twenty-one special stages covering a total competitive distance of 330.17 km (205.16 mi).

Elfyn Evans and Scott Martin were the defending rally winners. Their team, Toyota Gazoo Racing WRT, were the defending manufacturers' winners. Esapekka Lappi and Janne Ferm were the defending rally winners in the WRC-2 category. Kajetan Kajetanowicz and Maciej Szczepaniak were the defending rally winners in the WRC-3 category, with the Latvian crew of Mārtiņš Sesks and Francis Renars were the defending title-holders in the junior class.

Kalle Rovanperä and Jonne Halttunen won a hat-trick victory. Their team, Toyota Gazoo Racing WRT, successfully defended their title. Yohan Rossel and Valentin Sarreaud won the World Rally Championship-2 category. Sami Pajari and Enni Mälkönen won the World Rally Championship-3 category as well as the junior class.

== Background ==
=== Entry list ===
The following crews entered into the rally. The event opened to crews competing in the World Rally Championship, its support categories, the World Rally Championship-2 and World Rally Championship-3, and privateer entries that were not registered to score points in any championship. Twelve entered under Rally1 regulations, as were forty-one Rally2 crews in the World Rally Championship-2 and seven Rally3 crews in the World Rally Championship-3.

Rally1 entries competing in the World Rally Championship
No.	Driver	Co-Driver	Entrant	Car	Championship eligibility	Tyre
1	(France) Sébastien Ogier	(France) Benjamin Veillas	(Japan) Toyota Gazoo Racing WRT	Toyota GR Yaris Rally1	Driver, Co-driver, Manufacturer	P
6	(Spain) Dani Sordo	(Spain) Cándido Carrera	(South Korea) Hyundai Shell Mobis WRT	Hyundai i20 N Rally1	Driver, Co-driver, Manufacturer	P
7	(France) Pierre-Louis Loubet	(France) Vincent Landais	(United Kingdom) M-Sport Ford WRT	Ford Puma Rally1	Driver, Co-driver	P
8	(Estonia) Ott Tänak	(Estonia) Martin Järveoja	(South Korea) Hyundai Shell Mobis WRT	Hyundai i20 N Rally1	Driver, Co-driver, Manufacturer	P
11	(Belgium) Thierry Neuville	(Belgium) Martijn Wydaeghe	(South Korea) Hyundai Shell Mobis WRT	Hyundai i20 N Rally1	Driver, Co-driver, Manufacturer	P
16	(France) Adrien Fourmaux	(France) Alexandre Coria	(United Kingdom) M-Sport Ford WRT	Ford Puma Rally1	Driver, Co-driver, Manufacturer	P
18	(Japan) Takamoto Katsuta	(Republic of Ireland) Aaron Johnston	(Japan) Toyota Gazoo Racing WRT NG	Toyota GR Yaris Rally1	Driver, Co-driver, Manufacturer/Team	P
19	(France) Sébastien Loeb	(France) Isabelle Galmiche	(United Kingdom) M-Sport Ford WRT	Ford Puma Rally1	Driver, Co-driver, Manufacturer	P
33	(United Kingdom) Elfyn Evans	(United Kingdom) Scott Martin	(Japan) Toyota Gazoo Racing WRT	Toyota GR Yaris Rally1	Driver, Co-driver, Manufacturer	P
42	(Republic of Ireland) Craig Breen	(Republic of Ireland) Paul Nagle	(United Kingdom) M-Sport Ford WRT	Ford Puma Rally1	Driver, Co-driver, Manufacturer	P
44	(United Kingdom) Gus Greensmith	(Sweden) Jonas Andersson	(United Kingdom) M-Sport Ford WRT	Ford Puma Rally1	Driver, Co-driver	P
69	(Finland) Kalle Rovanperä	(Finland) Jonne Halttunen	(Japan) Toyota Gazoo Racing WRT	Toyota GR Yaris Rally1	Driver, Co-driver, Manufacturer	P

Rally2 entries competing in the World Rally Championship-2
No.	Driver	Co-Driver	Entrant	Car	Championship eligibility	Tyre
20	(Norway) Andreas Mikkelsen	(Norway) Torstein Eriksen	(Germany) Toksport WRT	Škoda Fabia Rally2 evo	Driver, Co-driver, Team	P
21	(Finland) Teemu Suninen	(Finland) Mikko Markkula	(South Korea) Hyundai Motorsport N	Hyundai i20 N Rally2	Driver, Co-driver, Team	P
23	(Sweden) Oliver Solberg	(United Kingdom) Elliott Edmondson	(South Korea) Hyundai Motorsport N	Hyundai i20 N Rally2	Driver, Co-driver	P
24	(Bolivia) Marco Bulacia	(Argentina) Marcelo Der Ohannesian	(Germany) Toksport WRT	Škoda Fabia Rally2 evo	Junior Driver, Co-driver, Team	P
25	(Poland) Kajetan Kajetanowicz	(Poland) Maciej Szczepaniak	(Poland) Kajetan Kajetanowicz	Škoda Fabia Rally2 evo	Driver, Co-driver	P
26	(France) Yohan Rossel	(France) Valentin Sarreaud	(France) PH Sport	Citroën C3 Rally2	Driver, Co-driver	P
27	(United Kingdom) Chris Ingram	(United Kingdom) Craig Drew	(United Kingdom) Chris Ingram	Škoda Fabia Rally2 evo	Junior Driver, Co-driver	P
28	(Spain) Jan Solans	(Spain) Rodrigo Sanjuan de Eusebio	(Spain) Jan Solans	Citroën C3 Rally2	Junior Driver, Co-driver	P
29	(France) Eric Camilli	(France) Thibault de la Haye	(France) Saintéloc Junior Team	Citroën C3 Rally2	Driver, Co-driver, Team	P
30	(Finland) Eerik Pietarinen	(Finland) Antti Linnaketo	(Finland) Eerik Pietarinen	Volkswagen Polo GTI R5	Junior Driver, Co-driver	P
31	(Estonia) Georg Linnamäe	(United Kingdom) James Morgan	(Estonia) ALM Motorsport	Volkswagen Polo GTI R5	Junior Driver, Co-driver	P
32	(Czech Republic) Erik Cais	(Czech Republic) Petr Těšínský	(Czech Republic) Yacco ACCR Team	Ford Fiesta Rally2	Junior Driver, Co-driver	P
34	(Bolivia) Bruno Bulacia	(Spain) Marc Martí	(Bolivia) Bruno Bulacia	Škoda Fabia Rally2 evo	Junior Driver, Co-driver	P
35	(Paraguay) Fabrizio Zaldívar	(Spain) Carlos del Barrio	(South Korea) Hyundai Motorsport N	Hyundai i20 N Rally2	Junior Driver, Co-driver, Team	P
36	(Republic of Ireland) Josh McErlean	(Republic of Ireland) James Fulton	(Republic of Ireland) Josh McErlean	Hyundai i20 N Rally2	Junior Driver, Junior Co-driver	P
37	(France) Stéphane Lefebvre	(France) Andy Malfoy	(France) Stéphane Lefebvre	Citroën C3 Rally2	Driver, Co-driver	—N/a
38	(Portugal) Armindo Araújo	(Portugal) Luís Ramalho	(Portugal) Armindo Araújo	Škoda Fabia Rally2 evo	Driver, Co-driver	P
39	(Mexico) Benito Guerra	(Spain) Daniel Cué	(Mexico) Benito Guerra	Škoda Fabia Rally2 evo	Driver, Co-driver	P
40	(Portugal) Miguel Correia	(Portugal) Jorge Eduardo Carvalho	(Portugal) Miguel Correia	Škoda Fabia Rally2 evo	Driver, Co-driver	P
41	(United States) Sean Johnston	(United States) Alexander Kihurani	(France) Saintéloc Junior Team	Citroën C3 Rally2	Driver, Co-driver, Team	P
43	(Portugal) Bruno Magalhães	(Portugal) Carlos Magalhães	(Portugal) Bruno Magalhães	Hyundai i20 N Rally2	Driver, Co-driver	P
45	(Poland) Mikołaj Marczyk	(Poland) Szymon Gospodarczyk	(Poland) Mikołaj Marczyk	Škoda Fabia Rally2 evo	Junior Driver, Co-driver	P
46	(Portugal) José Pedro Fontes	(Portugal) Inês Ponte	(Portugal) José Pedro Fontes	Citroën C3 Rally2	Driver, Co-driver	P
47	(Germany) Armin Kremer	(Germany) Timo Gottschalk	(Germany) Armin Kremer	Škoda Fabia Rally2 evo	Masters Driver, Co-driver	P
48	(Portugal) Pedro Almeida	(Portugal) Mário Castro	(Portugal) Pedro Almeida	Škoda Fabia Rally2 evo	Junior Driver, Co-driver	P
49	(Czech Republic) Martin Prokop	(Czech Republic) Michal Ernst	(Czech Republic) Martin Prokop	Ford Fiesta Rally2	Driver, Co-driver	P
50	(Portugal) Pedro Meireles	(Portugal) Pedro Alves	(Portugal) Pedro Meireles	Hyundai i20 N Rally2	Driver, Co-driver	P
51	(Chile) Emilio Fernández	(Spain) Axel Coronado Jiménez	(Chile) Emilio Fernández	Škoda Fabia Rally2 evo	Driver, Co-driver	P
52	(Portugal) Ricardo Teodósio	(Portugal) José Teixeira	(Portugal) Ricardo Teodósio	Hyundai i20 N Rally2	Driver, Co-driver	P
53	(Saudi Arabia) Rakan Al-Rashed	(Portugal) Hugo Magalhães	(Saudi Arabia) Rakan Al-Rashed	Volkswagen Polo GTI R5	Driver, Co-driver	P
54	(Portugal) Lucas Simões	(Portugal) Nuno Almeida	(Portugal) Lucas Simões	Hyundai i20 R5	Junior Driver, Co-driver	P
55	(Brazil) Paulo Nobre	(Brazil) Gabriel Morales	(Brazil) Paulo Nobre	Škoda Fabia R5	Masters Driver, Co-driver	—N/a
56	(Portugal) Diogo Salvi	(Portugal) Miguel Ramalho	(Portugal) Diogo Salvi	Škoda Fabia R5	Driver, Co-driver	P
57	(France) Patrick Déjean	(France) Yannick Jammes	(France) Patrick Déjean	Ford Fiesta R5	Driver, Co-driver	P
58	(Portugal) Paulo Caldeira	(Portugal) Ana Gonçalves	(Portugal) Paulo Caldeira	Citroën C3 Rally2	Driver, Co-driver	P
59	(Spain) Alexander Villanueva	(Spain) Rodrigo Sanjuan	(Spain) Alexander Villanueva	Škoda Fabia Rally2 evo	Masters Driver, Co-driver	P
60	(Portugal) Francisco Teixeira	(Portugal) João Serôdio	(Portugal) Francisco Teixeira	Škoda Fabia Rally2 evo	Masters Driver, Co-driver	P
61	(Republic of Ireland) Paul Rowley	(Republic of Ireland) Andy Hayes	(Republic of Ireland) Paul Rowley	Hyundai i20 N Rally2	Driver, Co-driver	P
62	(France) Frédéric Rosati	(Belgium) Stéphane Prévot	(France) Frédéric Rosati	Hyundai i20 N Rally2	Masters Driver, Masters Co-driver	P
63	(Italy) Fabrizio Arengi	(Italy) Massimiliano Bosi	(Italy) Fabrizio Arengi	Škoda Fabia Rally2 evo	Masters Driver, Co-driver	P
64	(Spain) Miguel Díaz-Aboitiz	(Spain) Jordi Hereu	(Spain) Miguel Díaz-Aboitiz	Škoda Fabia Rally2 evo	Masters Driver, Co-driver	P
76	(France) Laurent Battut	(Belgium) Eric Gressens	(France) Laurent Battut	Hyundai i20 R5	Masters Driver, Masters Co-driver	P
81	(France) Jean-Michel Raoux	(France) Laurent Magat	(France) Jean-Michel Raoux	Volkswagen Polo GTI R5	Masters Driver, Masters Co-driver	P
82	(Portugal) Manuel Castro	(Portugal) Ricardo Cunha	(Portugal) Manuel Castro	Škoda Fabia R5	Driver, Co-driver	P
83	(Portugal) Ricardo Filipe	(Portugal) Fernando Almeida	(Portugal) Ricardo Filipe	Ford Fiesta R5	Driver, Co-driver	P

Rally3 entries competing in the World Rally Championship-3
No.	Driver	Co-Driver	Entrant	Car	Championship eligibility	Tyre
65	(United Kingdom) Jon Armstrong	(Republic of Ireland) Brian Hoy	(United Kingdom) Jon Armstrong	Ford Fiesta Rally3	Junior	P
66	(Finland) Sami Pajari	(Finland) Enni Mälkönen	(Finland) Sami Pajari	Ford Fiesta Rally3	Junior, Open	P
67	(Finland) Lauri Joona	(Finland) Mikael Korhonen	(Finland) Lauri Joona	Ford Fiesta Rally3	Junior, Open	P
68	(Republic of Ireland) William Creighton	(Republic of Ireland) Liam Regan	(Republic of Ireland) Motorsport Ireland Rally Academy	Ford Fiesta Rally3	Junior, Open	P
70	(Estonia) Robert Virves	(Estonia) Aleks Lesk	(Estonia) Starter Energy Racing	Ford Fiesta Rally3	Junior	P
71	(France) Jean-Baptiste Franceschi	(France) Anthony Gorguilo	(France) Jean-Baptiste Franceschi	Ford Fiesta Rally3	Junior	—N/a
72	(Kenya) McRae Kimathi	(United Kingdom) Stuart Loudon	(Kenya) McRae Kimathi	Ford Fiesta Rally3	Junior, Open	P

Other major entries
No.	Driver	Co-Driver	Entrant	Car	Tyre
22	Nikolay Gryazin (Note: Nikolay Gryazin is Russian, but he competes as a neutral competitor using the ANA flag as Russian national emblems were banned by the association due to the Russian invasion of Ukraine.)	Konstantin Aleksandrov (Note: Konstantin Aleksandrov is Russian, but he competes as a neutral competitor using the ANA flag as Russian national emblems were banned by the association due to the Russian invasion of Ukraine.)	(Germany) Toksport WRT 2	Škoda Fabia Rally2 evo	P
74	(Spain) Pepe López	(Spain) Borja Rozada	(Spain) Pepe López	Hyundai i20 N Rally2	—N/a

=== Itinerary ===
All dates and times are in WEST (UTC+1).

Date	Time	No.	Stage name	Distance
19 May	9:01	—	Paredes [Shakedown]	4.55 km
19 May	19:03	SS1	SSS Coimbra	2.82 km
20 May	8:08	SS2	Lousã 1	12.03 km
20 May	9:08	SS3	Góis 1	19.33 km
20 May	10:08	SS4	Arganil 1	18.72 km
20 May	12:31	SS5	Lousã 2	12.03 km
20 May	13:31	SS6	Góis 2	19.33 km
20 May	14:38	SS7	Arganil 2	18.72 km
20 May	16:05	SS8	Mortágua	18.15 km
20 May	19:03	SS9	SSS Lousada	3.36 km
21 May	7:38	SS10	Vieira do Minho 1	21.57 km
21 May	8:38	SS11	Cabeceiras de Basto 1	22.03 km
21 May	9:54	SS12	Amarante 1	37.24 km
21 May	14:38	SS13	Vieira do Minho 2	21.57 km
21 May	15:38	SS14	Cabeceiras de Basto 2	22.03 km
21 May	16:54	SS15	Amarante 2	37.24 km
21 May	19:03	SS16	SSS Porto - Foz	3.30 km
22 May	7:08	SS17	Felgueiras 1	8.91 km
22 May	7:57	SS18	Montim	8.69 km
22 May	8:38	SS19	Fafe 1	11.18 km
22 May	10:08	SS20	Felgueiras 2	8.91 km
22 May	12:18	SS21	Fafe 2 [Power Stage]	11.18 km

== Report ==
=== WRC Rally1 ===
==== Classification ====
Position		No.	Driver	Co-driver	Entrant	Car	Time	Difference	Points	
Event	Class	No.	Driver	Co-driver	Entrant	Car	Time	Difference	Event	Stage
1	1	69	Kalle Rovanperä	Jonne Halttunen	Toyota Gazoo Racing WRT	Toyota GR Yaris Rally1	3:44:19.2	0.0	25	5
2	2	33	Elfyn Evans	Scott Martin	Toyota Gazoo Racing WRT	Toyota GR Yaris Rally1	3:44:34.4	+15.2	18	1
3	3	6	Dani Sordo	Cándido Carrera	Hyundai Shell Mobis WRT	Hyundai i20 N Rally1	3:46:36.5	+2:17.3	15	4
4	4	18	Takamoto Katsuta	Aaron Johnston	Toyota Gazoo Racing WRT NG	Toyota GR Yaris Rally1	3:46:38.6	+2:19.4	12	0
5	5	11	Thierry Neuville	Martijn Wydaeghe	Hyundai Shell Mobis WRT	Hyundai i20 N Rally1	3:46:57.0	+2:37.8	10	3
6	6	8	Ott Tänak	Martin Järveoja	Hyundai Shell Mobis WRT	Hyundai i20 N Rally1	3:49:04.9	+4:45.7	8	2
7	7	7	Pierre-Louis Loubet	Vincent Landais	M-Sport Ford WRT	Ford Puma Rally1	3:50:11.3	+5:52.1	6	0
8	8	42	Craig Breen	Paul Nagle	M-Sport Ford WRT	Ford Puma Rally1	3:51:22.6	+7:03.4	4	0
9	9	16	Adrien Fourmaux	Alexandre Coria	M-Sport Ford WRT	Ford Puma Rally1	3:52:28.8	+8:09.6	2	0
19	10	44	Gus Greensmith	Jonas Andersson	M-Sport Ford WRT	Ford Puma Rally1	4:18:12.2	+33:53.0	0	0
51	11	1	Sébastien Ogier	Benjamin Veillas	Toyota Gazoo Racing WRT	Toyota GR Yaris Rally1	5:47:12.4	+2:02:53.2	0	0
Retired SS12		19	Sébastien Loeb	Isabelle Galmiche	M-Sport Ford WRT	Ford Puma Rally1	Mechanical		0	0

==== Special stages ====
Stage	Winners	Car	Time	Class leaders
SD	Evans / Martin	Toyota GR Yaris Rally1	2:56.1	—N/a
SS1	Neuville / Wydaeghe	Hyundai i20 N Rally1	2:37.9	Neuville / Wydaeghe
SS2	Evans / Martin	Toyota GR Yaris Rally1	8:58.9	Evans / Martin
SS3	Evans / Martin	Toyota GR Yaris Rally1	13:12.7	Evans / Martin
SS4	Loeb / Galmiche	Ford Puma Rally1	11:48.0	Loeb / Galmiche
SS5	Ogier / Veillas	Toyota GR Yaris Rally1	8:58.7	Evans / Martin
SS6	Evans / Martin	Toyota GR Yaris Rally1	13:12.6	Evans / Martin
SS7	Rovanperä / Halttunen	Toyota GR Yaris Rally1	11:51.6	Evans / Martin
SS8	Rovanperä / Halttunen	Toyota GR Yaris Rally1	12:01.7	Evans / Martin
SS9	Evans / Martin	Toyota GR Yaris Rally1	2:37.7	Evans / Martin
SS10	Evans / Martin	Toyota GR Yaris Rally1	13:37.9	Evans / Martin
SS11	Rovanperä / Halttunen	Toyota GR Yaris Rally1	13:26.8	Evans / Martin
SS12	Evans / Martin	Toyota GR Yaris Rally1	25:02.3	Evans / Martin
SS13	Rovanperä / Halttunen	Toyota GR Yaris Rally1	13:36.9	Evans / Martin
SS14	Rovanperä / Halttunen	Toyota GR Yaris Rally1	13:28.6	Evans / Martin
SS15	Neuville / Wydaeghe	Hyundai i20 N Rally1	24:42.2	Rovanperä / Halttunen
SS16	Rovanperä / Halttunen	Toyota GR Yaris Rally1	3:28.7	Rovanperä / Halttunen
SS17	Rovanperä / Halttunen	Toyota GR Yaris Rally1	5:57.0	Rovanperä / Halttunen
SS18	Tänak / Järveoja	Hyundai i20 N Rally1	5:34.3	Rovanperä / Halttunen
SS19	Tänak / Järveoja	Hyundai i20 N Rally1	6:32.3	Rovanperä / Halttunen
SS20	Rovanperä / Halttunen	Toyota GR Yaris Rally1	5:54.7	Rovanperä / Halttunen
SS21	Rovanperä / Halttunen	Toyota GR Yaris Rally1	6:28.2	Rovanperä / Halttunen

==== Championship standings ====
Pos.	Drivers' championships			Co-drivers' championships			Manufacturers' championships		
Pos.	Move	Driver	Points	Move	Co-driver	Points	Move	Manufacturer	Points
1		Kalle Rovanperä	106		Jonne Halttunen	106		Toyota Gazoo Racing WRT	175
2		Thierry Neuville	60		Martijn Wydaeghe	60		Hyundai Shell Mobis WRT	116
3	3	Takamoto Katsuta	38	3	Aaron Johnston	38		M-Sport Ford WRT	93
4	1	Ott Tänak	37	1	Martin Järveoja	37		Toyota Gazoo Racing WRT NG	42
5	4	Elfyn Evans	36	4	Scott Martin	36			

=== WRC-2 Rally2 ===
==== Classification ====
Position		No.	Driver	Co-driver	Entrant	Car	Time	Difference	Points		
Event	Class	No.	Driver	Co-driver	Entrant	Car	Time	Difference	Class	Stage	Event
10	1	26	Yohan Rossel	Valentin Sarreaud	PH Sport	Citroën C3 Rally2	3:58:08.1	0.0	25	0	1
11	2	25	Kajetan Kajetanowicz	Maciej Szczepaniak	Kajetan Kajetanowicz	Škoda Fabia Rally2 evo	3:59:20.2	+1:12.1	18	2	0
12	3	27	Chris Ingram	Craig Drew	Chris Ingram	Škoda Fabia Rally2 evo	4:04:02.8	+5:54.7	15	0	0
13	4	45	Mikołaj Marczyk	Szymon Gospodarczyk	Mikołaj Marczyk	Škoda Fabia Rally2 evo	4:05:17.5	+7:09.4	12	0	0
14	5	38	Armindo Araújo	Luís Ramalho	Armindo Araújo	Škoda Fabia Rally2 evo	4:05:56.0	+7:47.9	10	0	0
15	6	52	Ricardo Teodósio	José Teixeira	Ricardo Teodósio	Hyundai i20 N Rally2	4:06:18.5	+8:10.4	8	0	0
16	7	49	Martin Prokop	Michal Ernst	Martin Prokop	Ford Fiesta Rally2	4:07:32.8	+9:24.7	6	0	0
21	8	81	Jean-Michel Raoux	Laurent Magat	Jean-Michel Raoux	Volkswagen Polo GTI R5	4:29:43.8	+31:35.7	4	0	0
22	9	62	Frédéric Rosati	Stéphane Prévot	Frédéric Rosati	Hyundai i20 N Rally2	4:29:46.1	+31:38.0	2	0	0
23	10	53	Rakan Al-Rashed	Hugo Magalhães	Rakan Al-Rashed	Volkswagen Polo GTI R5	4:32:25.3	+34:17.2	1	0	0
24	11	76	Laurent Battut	Eric Gressens	Laurent Battut	Hyundai i20 R5	4:32:30.9	+34:22.8	0	0	0
29	12	64	Miguel Díaz-Aboitiz	Jordi Hereu	Miguel Díaz-Aboitiz	Škoda Fabia Rally2 evo	4:41:44.4	+43:36.3	0	0	0
30	13	63	Miguel Díaz-Aboitiz	Jordi Hereu	Miguel Díaz-Aboitiz	Škoda Fabia Rally2 evo	4:41:59.4	+43:51.3	0	0	0
31	14	35	Fabrizio Zaldívar	Carlos del Barrio	Hyundai Motorsport N	Hyundai i20 N Rally2	4:43:40.5	+45:32.4	0	0	0
33	15	58	Paulo Caldeira	Ana Gonçalves	Paulo Caldeira	Citroën C3 R5	4:48:28.9	+50:20.8	0	0	0
34	16	60	Francisco Teixeira	João Serôdio	Francisco Teixeira	Škoda Fabia Rally2 evo	4:48:29.1	+50:21.0	0	0	0
35	17	30	Eerik Pietarinen	Antti Linnaketo	Eerik Pietarinen	Volkswagen Polo GTI R5	4:49:34.8	+51:26.7	0	0	0
37	18	46	José Pedro Fontes	Inês Ponte	José Pedro Fontes	Citroën C3 Rally2	4:57:33.5	+59:25.4	0	0	0
40	19	36	Josh McErlean	James Fulton	Josh McErlean	Hyundai i20 N Rally2	5:02:20.8	+1:04:12.7	0	0	0
42	20	32	Erik Cais	Petr Těšínský	Yacco ACCR Team	Ford Fiesta Rally2	5:05:32.6	+1:07:24.5	0	0	0
43	21	28	Jan Solans	Rodrigo Sanjuan de Eusebio	Jan Solans	Citroën C3 Rally2	5:06:18.0	+1:08:09.9	0	1	0
44	22	34	Bruno Bulacia	Marc Martí	Bruno Bulacia	Škoda Fabia Rally2 evo	5:23:45.4	+1:25:37.3	0	0	0
45	23	59	Alexander Villanueva	Rodrigo Sanjuan	Alexander Villanueva	Škoda Fabia Rally2 evo	5:25:21.4	+1:27:13.3	0	0	0
46	24	51	Emilio Fernández	Axel Coronado Jiménez	Emilio Fernández	Škoda Fabia Rally2 evo	5:30:08.3	+1:32:00.2	0	0	0
47	25	23	Oliver Solberg	Elliott Edmondson	Hyundai Motorsport N	Hyundai i20 N Rally2	5:33:58.8	+1:35:50.7	0	3	0
48	26	57	Patrick Déjean	Yannick Jammes	Patrick Déjean	Ford Fiesta R5	5:37:47.5	+1:39:39.4	0	0	0
Retired SS21		21	Teemu Suninen	Mikko Markkula	Hyundai Motorsport N	Hyundai i20 N Rally2	Off-road		0	0	0
Retired SS18		39	Benito Guerra	Daniel Cué	Benito Guerra	Škoda Fabia Rally2 evo	Mechanical		0	0	0
Retired SS12		31	Georg Linnamäe	James Morgan	ALM Motorsport	Volkswagen Polo GTI R5	Mechanical		0	0	0
Complete leg 1		40	Miguel Correia	Jorge Eduardo Carvalho	Miguel Correia	Škoda Fabia Rally2 evo	National Only		0	0	0
Complete leg 1		54	Lucas Simões	Nuno Almeida	Lucas Simões	Hyundai i20 R5	National Only		0	0	0
Retired SS9		20	Andreas Mikkelsen	Torstein Eriksen	Toksport WRT	Škoda Fabia Rally2 evo	Engine		0	0	0
Retired SS9		24	Marco Bulacia	Marcelo Der Ohannesian	Toksport WRT	Škoda Fabia Rally2 evo	Mechanical		0	0	0
Retired SS9		41	Sean Johnston	Alexander Kihurani	Saintéloc Junior Team	Citroën C3 Rally2	Mechanical		0	0	0
Retired SS8		56	Diogo Salvi	Miguel Ramalho	Diogo Salvi	Škoda Fabia R5	Mechanical		0	0	0
Retired SS8		82	Manuel Castro	Ricardo Cunha	Manuel Castro	Škoda Fabia R5	Fire		0	0	0
Retired SS7		83	Ricardo Filipe	Fernando Almeida	Ricardo Filipe	Ford Fiesta R5	Mechanical		0	0	0
Retired SS6		48	Pedro Almeida	Mário Castro	Pedro Almeida	Škoda Fabia Rally2 evo	Steering		0	0	0
Retired SS5		43	Bruno Magalhães	Carlos Magalhães	Bruno Magalhães	Hyundai i20 N Rally2	Suspension		0	0	0
Retired SS5		61	Paul Rowley	Andy Hayes	Paul Rowley	Hyundai i20 N Rally2	Exhaust		0	0	0
Retired SS4		47	Armin Kremer	Timo Gottschalk	Armin Kremer	Škoda Fabia Rally2 evo	Mechanical		0	0	0
Retired SS4		50	Pedro Meireles	Pedro Alves	Pedro Meireles	Hyundai i20 N Rally2	Mechanical		0	0	0
Did not start		29	Eric Camilli	Thibault de la Haye	Saintéloc Junior Team	Citroën C3 Rally2	Electrical		0	0	0
Did not start		37	Stéphane Lefebvre	Andy Malfoy	Stéphane Lefebvre	Citroën C3 Rally2	Withdrawn		0	0	0
Did not start		55	Paulo Nobre	Gabriel Morales	Paulo Nobre	Škoda Fabia R5	Withdrawn		0	0	0

==== Special stages ====
Stage	Open Championship				Junior Championship				Masters Cup			
Stage	Winners	Car	Time	Class leaders	Winners	Car	Time	Class leaders	Winners	Car	Time	Class leaders
SD	Suninen / Markkula	Hyundai i20 N Rally2	3:03.5	—N/a	M. Bulacia / Der Ohannesian	Škoda Fabia Rally2 evo	3:05.0	—N/a	Salvi / Ramalho	Škoda Fabia R5	3:13.0	—N/a
SS1	Marczyk / Gospodarczyk	Škoda Fabia Rally2 evo	2:42.8	Marczyk / Gospodarczyk	Marczyk / Gospodarczyk	Škoda Fabia Rally2 evo	2:42.8	Marczyk / Gospodarczyk	Kremer / Gottschalk	Škoda Fabia Rally2 evo	2:50.7	Kremer / Gottschalk
SS2	Suninen / Markkula	Hyundai i20 N Rally2	9:23.5	Suninen / Markkula	Solans / Sanjuan de Eusebio	Citroën C3 Rally2	9:31.0	Ingram / Drew	Kremer / Gottschalk	Škoda Fabia Rally2 evo	9:51.1	Kremer / Gottschalk
SS3	Suninen / Markkula	Hyundai i20 N Rally2	13:46.6	Suninen / Markkula	Ingram / Drew	Škoda Fabia Rally2 evo	14:06.1	Ingram / Drew	Kremer / Gottschalk	Škoda Fabia Rally2 evo	15:02.8	Kremer / Gottschalk
SS4	Suninen / Markkula	Hyundai i20 N Rally2	12:30.8	Suninen / Markkula	Solans / Sanjuan de Eusebio	Citroën C3 Rally2	12:51.3	Ingram / Drew	Salvi / Ramalho	Škoda Fabia R5	13:55.7	Salvi / Ramalho
SS5	Suninen / Markkula	Hyundai i20 N Rally2	9:23.5	Suninen / Markkula	M. Bulacia / Der Ohannesian	Škoda Fabia Rally2 evo	9:28.6	Ingram / Drew	Raoux / Magat	Volkswagen Polo GTI R5	10:15.8	Raoux / Magat
SS6	Suninen / Markkula	Hyundai i20 N Rally2	13:58.0	Suninen / Markkula	Linnamäe / Morgan	Volkswagen Polo GTI R5	14:23.4	Ingram / Drew	Rosati / Prévot	Hyundai i20 N Rally2	16:08.2	Raoux / Magat
SS7	Mikkelsen / Eriksen	Škoda Fabia Rally2 evo	12:39.0	Mikkelsen / Eriksen	Marczyk / Gospodarczyk	Škoda Fabia Rally2 evo	13:04.0	Marczyk / Gospodarczyk	Raoux / Magat	Volkswagen Polo GTI R5	14:12.1	Raoux / Magat
SS8	Suninen / Markkula	Hyundai i20 N Rally2	12:44.6	Mikkelsen / Eriksen	Ingram / Drew	Škoda Fabia Rally2 evo	13:05.7	Marczyk / Gospodarczyk	Rosati / Prévot	Hyundai i20 N Rally2	14:22.0	Raoux / Magat
SS9	Kajetanowicz / Szczepaniak	Škoda Fabia Rally2 evo	2:41.4	Suninen / Markkula	Marczyk / Gospodarczyk	Škoda Fabia Rally2 evo	2:42.9	Marczyk / Gospodarczyk	Díaz-Aboitiz / Hereu	Škoda Fabia Rally2 evo	2:55.6	Raoux / Magat
SS10	Suninen / Markkula	Hyundai i20 N Rally2	14:19.6	Suninen / Markkula	Ingram / Drew	Škoda Fabia Rally2 evo	14:27.5	Marczyk / Gospodarczyk	Villanueva / Murado	Škoda Fabia Rally2 evo	15:06.3	Raoux / Magat
SS11	Solberg / Edmondson	Hyundai i20 N Rally2	14:17.1	Suninen / Markkula	Ingram / Drew	Škoda Fabia Rally2 evo	14:37.8	Ingram / Drew	Villanueva / Murado	Škoda Fabia Rally2 evo	15:00.9	Raoux / Magat
SS12	Rossel / Sarreaud	Citroën C3 Rally2	26:13.4	Suninen / Markkula	Pietarinen / Linnaketo	Volkswagen Polo GTI R5	26:47.1	Ingram / Drew	Raoux / Magat	Volkswagen Polo GTI R5	28:37.7	Raoux / Magat
SS13	Suninen / Markkula	Hyundai i20 N Rally2	14:08.1	Suninen / Markkula	Ingram / Drew	Škoda Fabia Rally2 evo	14:28.9	Ingram / Drew	Villanueva / Murado	Škoda Fabia Rally2 evo	15:02.9	Raoux / Magat
SS14	Suninen / Markkula	Hyundai i20 N Rally2	14:13.1	Suninen / Markkula	B. Bulacia / Martí	Škoda Fabia Rally2 evo	14:25.8	Ingram / Drew	Villanueva / Murado	Škoda Fabia Rally2 evo	14:50.7	Raoux / Magat
SS15	Suninen / Markkula	Hyundai i20 N Rally2	26:10.9	Suninen / Markkula	Pietarinen / Linnaketo	Volkswagen Polo GTI R5	26:37.7	Ingram / Drew	Villanueva / Murado	Škoda Fabia Rally2 evo	27:28.7	Rosati / Prévot
SS16	McErlean / Fulton	Hyundai i20 N Rally2	3:21.2	Suninen / Markkula	McErlean / Fulton	Hyundai i20 N Rally2	3:21.2	Ingram / Drew	Díaz-Aboitiz / Hereu	Škoda Fabia Rally2 evo	3:34.4	Rosati / Prévot
SS17	Suninen / Markkula	Hyundai i20 N Rally2	6:24.4	Suninen / Markkula	Marczyk / Gospodarczyk	Škoda Fabia Rally2 evo	6:29.9	Ingram / Drew	Villanueva / Murado	Škoda Fabia Rally2 evo	6:46.3	Rosati / Prévot
SS18	Suninen / Markkula	Hyundai i20 N Rally2	6:00.4	Suninen / Markkula	Ingram / Drew	Škoda Fabia Rally2 evo	6:06.3	Ingram / Drew	Villanueva / Murado	Škoda Fabia Rally2 evo	6:22.7	Rosati / Prévot
SS19	Kajetanowicz / Szczepaniak	Škoda Fabia Rally2 evo	7:09.8	Suninen / Markkula	Solans / Sanjuan de Eusebio	Citroën C3 Rally2	7:17.8	Ingram / Drew	Villanueva / Murado	Škoda Fabia Rally2 evo	7:41.4	Rosati / Prévot
SS20	Solberg / Edmondson	Hyundai i20 N Rally2	6:22.3	Suninen / Markkula	Marczyk / Gospodarczyk	Škoda Fabia Rally2 evo	6:27.3	Ingram / Drew	Villanueva / Murado	Škoda Fabia Rally2 evo	6:41.4	Raoux / Magat
SS21	Solberg / Edmondson	Hyundai i20 N Rally2	6:54.4	Rossel / Sarreaud	Solans / Sanjuan de Eusebio	Citroën C3 Rally2	7:03.9	Ingram / Drew	Villanueva / Murado	Škoda Fabia Rally2 evo	7:23.8	Raoux / Magat

==== Championship standings ====
Pos.	Open Drivers' championships			Open Co-drivers' championships			Teams' championships			Junior Drivers' championships			Junior Co-drivers' championships			Driver Masters' championships			Co-driver Masters' championships		
Pos.	Move	Driver	Points	Move	Co-driver	Points	Move	Manufacturer	Points	Move	Manufacturer	Points	Move	Driver	Points	Move	Driver	Points	Move	Driver	Points
1	1	Yohan Rossel	61		Torstein Eriksen	51		Toksport WRT	62	4	Chris Ingram	52		Louis Louka	43		Mauro Miele	61	2	Laurent Magat	50
2	1	Andreas Mikkelsen	51	1	Valentin Sarreaud	50		Toksport WRT 2	58	1	Erik Cais	45	2	James Fulton	43	7	Jean-Michel Raoux	37	1	Michael Joseph Morrissey	36
3	4	Kajetan Kajetanowicz	38	4	Maciej Szczepaniak	38		Yaco ACCR Team	50	1	Nikolay Gryazin	36	1	Elia De Guio	25	1	Olivier Burri	33	1	Michela Lorigiola	30
4	4	Chris Ingram	31	2	Konstantin Aleksandrov	27		Saintéloc Junior Team	40	1	Emil Lindholm	33	1	Samu Vaaleri	25	2	Fabrizio Arengi	28		Jörgen Fornander	25
5	2	Nikolay Gryazin	27	9	Craig Drew	25	New entry	Hyundai Motorsport N	25	1	Eerik Pietarinen	30				1	Armin Kremer	25		Hans van Goor	25

=== WRC-3 Rally3 ===
==== Classification ====
Position		No.	Driver	Co-driver	Entrant	Car	Time	Difference	Points		
Event	Class	No.	Driver	Co-driver	Entrant	Car	Time	Difference	Open	Junior	Stage
17	1	66	Sami Pajari	Enni Mälkönen	Sami Pajari	Ford Fiesta Rally3	4:13:33.2	0.0	25	25	6
18	2	67	Lauri Joona	Mikael Korhonen	Lauri Joona	Ford Fiesta Rally3	4:18:03.4	+4:30.2	18	18	1
27	3	70	Robert Virves	Aleks Lesk	Starter Energy Racing	Ford Fiesta Rally3	4:37:10.9	+23:37.7	—N/a	15	5
32	4	65	Jon Armstrong	Brian Hoy	Jon Armstrong	Ford Fiesta Rally3	4:44:24.7	+30:51.5	—N/a	12	8
52	5	72	McRae Kimathi	Stuart Loudon	McRae Kimathi	Ford Fiesta Rally3	6:10:12.1	+1:56:38.9	15	10	6
Retired SS19		68	William Creighton	Liam Regan	Motorsport Ireland Rally Academy	Ford Fiesta Rally3	Mechanical		0	0	1
Did not start		71	Jean-Baptiste Franceschi	Anthony Gorguilo	Jean-Baptiste Franceschi	Ford Fiesta Rally3	Withdrawn		—N/a	0	0

==== Special stages ====
Stage	Open Championship				Junior Championship			
Stage	Winners	Car	Time	Class leaders	Winners	Car	Time	Class leaders
SD	Pajari / Mälkönen	Ford Fiesta Rally3	3:15.3	—N/a	Virves / Lesk	Ford Fiesta Rally3	3:12.4	—N/a
SS1	Pajari / Mälkönen	Ford Fiesta Rally3	2:52.4	Pajari / Mälkönen	Pajari / Mälkönen	Ford Fiesta Rally3	2:52.4	Pajari / Mälkönen
SS2	Joona / Korhonen	Ford Fiesta Rally3	10:07.5	Pajari / Mälkönen	Armstrong / Hoy	Ford Fiesta Rally3	10:04.0	Armstrong / Hoy
SS3	Creighton / Regan	Ford Fiesta Rally3	15:04.2	Joona / Korhonen	Virves / Lesk	Ford Fiesta Rally3	14:49.5	Armstrong / Hoy
SS4	Pajari / Mälkönen	Ford Fiesta Rally3	13:15.5	Joona / Korhonen	Pajari / Mälkönen	Ford Fiesta Rally3	13:15.5	Armstrong / Hoy
SS5	Pajari / Mälkönen	Ford Fiesta Rally3	9:54.8	Joona / Korhonen	Pajari / Mälkönen	Ford Fiesta Rally3	9:54.8	Armstrong / Hoy
SS6	Pajari / Mälkönen	Ford Fiesta Rally3	14:57.1	Pajari / Mälkönen	Pajari / Mälkönen	Ford Fiesta Rally3	14:57.1	Armstrong / Hoy
SS7	Pajari / Mälkönen	Ford Fiesta Rally3	13:15.4	Pajari / Mälkönen	Pajari / Mälkönen	Ford Fiesta Rally3	13:15.4	Pajari / Mälkönen
SS8	Pajari / Mälkönen	Ford Fiesta Rally3	13:16.9	Pajari / Mälkönen	Pajari / Mälkönen	Ford Fiesta Rally3	13:16.9	Pajari / Mälkönen
SS9	Pajari / Mälkönen	Ford Fiesta Rally3	2:48.3	Pajari / Mälkönen	Virves / Lesk	Ford Fiesta Rally3	2:48.1	Pajari / Mälkönen
SS10	Joona / Korhonen	Ford Fiesta Rally3	15:08.4	Pajari / Mälkönen	Armstrong / Hoy	Ford Fiesta Rally3	15:00.6	Pajari / Mälkönen
SS11	Pajari / Mälkönen	Ford Fiesta Rally3	15:15.6	Pajari / Mälkönen	Armstrong / Hoy	Ford Fiesta Rally3	14:56.3	Pajari / Mälkönen
SS12	Creighton / Regan	Ford Fiesta Rally3	27:24.7	Pajari / Mälkönen	Creighton / Regan	Ford Fiesta Rally3	27:24.7	Pajari / Mälkönen
SS13	Creighton / Regan	Ford Fiesta Rally3	14:57.3	Pajari / Mälkönen	Armstrong / Hoy	Ford Fiesta Rally3	14:53.7	Pajari / Mälkönen
SS14	Creighton / Regan	Ford Fiesta Rally3	15:05.7	Pajari / Mälkönen	Armstrong / Hoy	Ford Fiesta Rally3	14:57.3	Pajari / Mälkönen
SS15	Joona / Korhonen	Ford Fiesta Rally3	27:27.3	Pajari / Mälkönen	Joona / Korhonen	Ford Fiesta Rally3	27:27.3	Pajari / Mälkönen
SS16	Joona / Korhonen	Ford Fiesta Rally3	3:34.4	Pajari / Mälkönen	Virves / Lesk	Ford Fiesta Rally3	3:28.5	Pajari / Mälkönen
SS17	Creighton / Regan	Ford Fiesta Rally3	6:43.2	Pajari / Mälkönen	Virves / Lesk	Ford Fiesta Rally3	6:39.1	Pajari / Mälkönen
SS18	Creighton / Regan	Ford Fiesta Rally3	6:21.8	Pajari / Mälkönen	Virves / Lesk	Ford Fiesta Rally3	6:19.6	Pajari / Mälkönen
SS19	Pajari / Mälkönen	Ford Fiesta Rally3	7:53.5	Pajari / Mälkönen	Armstrong / Hoy	Ford Fiesta Rally3	7:33.2	Pajari / Mälkönen
SS20	Joona / Korhonen	Ford Fiesta Rally3	6:46.6	Pajari / Mälkönen	Armstrong / Hoy	Ford Fiesta Rally3	6:36.2	Pajari / Mälkönen
SS21	Joona / Korhonen	Ford Fiesta Rally3	7:33.0	Pajari / Mälkönen	Armstrong / Hoy	Ford Fiesta Rally3	7:23.8	Pajari / Mälkönen

==== Championship standings ====
Pos.	Open Drivers' championships			Open Co-drivers' championships			Junior Drivers' championships			Junior Co-drivers' championships		
Pos.	Move	Driver	Points	Move	Co-driver	Points	Move	Manufacturer	Points	Move	Manufacturer	Points
1		Sami Pajari	62		Enni Mälkönen	62	1	Jon Armstrong	67	1	Brian Hoy	67
2	3	Lauri Joona	43	3	Mikael Korhonen	43	1	Lauri Joona	66	1	Mikael Korhonen	66
3	1	Enrico Brazzoli	33	1	Manuel Fenoli	33	2	Sami Pajari	56	2	Enni Mälkönen	56
4	1	William Creighton	30	1	Liam Regan	30	1	Robert Virves	49	1	Aleks Lesk	49
5	2	McRae Kimathi	30	1	Tamás Kürti	25	1	William Creighton	28	1	Liam Regan	28

== Notes ==
Previous rally: 2022 Croatia Rally	2022 FIA World Rally Championship	Next rally: 2022 Rally Italia Sardegna
Previous rally: 2021 Rally de Portugal	2022 Rally de Portugal	Next rally: 2023 Rally de Portugal
